= New England Patriots Radio Network =

Official radio network of the NFL's New England Patriots

The New England Patriots Radio Network is a radio network which carries live game broadcasts of the New England Patriots. The network's flagship station is WBZ-FM in Boston. Bob Socci, who now does the play-by-play with former Patriots quarterback Scott Zolak providing the color commentary and former Patriots linebacker Matt Chatham and WBZ-TV/WSBK-TV sports reporter Steve Burton providing the sideline reports. Marc Bertrand and Boston Globe sports columnist Chris Gasper host the pregame, and the postgame show is hosted by Bertrand. Albert Breer and Patriots Football Weekly writer Paul Perillo is a regular guest analyst on the network's pre-game show. Marc D. Cappello has been the producer since 1995.

Gil Santos, former WBZ 1030 sports reporter who was known as the "Voice of the New England Patriots," retired after the 2012 season and was replaced by Bob Socci. Santos called the Patriots' December win over the Dolphins that season. Part of Santos' radio call was simulcast by CBS television in recognition of his time with the team. Former hosts of the network's pre- and postgame show include Gary Tanguay, Andy Gresh, Bill Abbate, Mike Ruth, Tim Fox, Pete Brock, and Steve DeOssie.

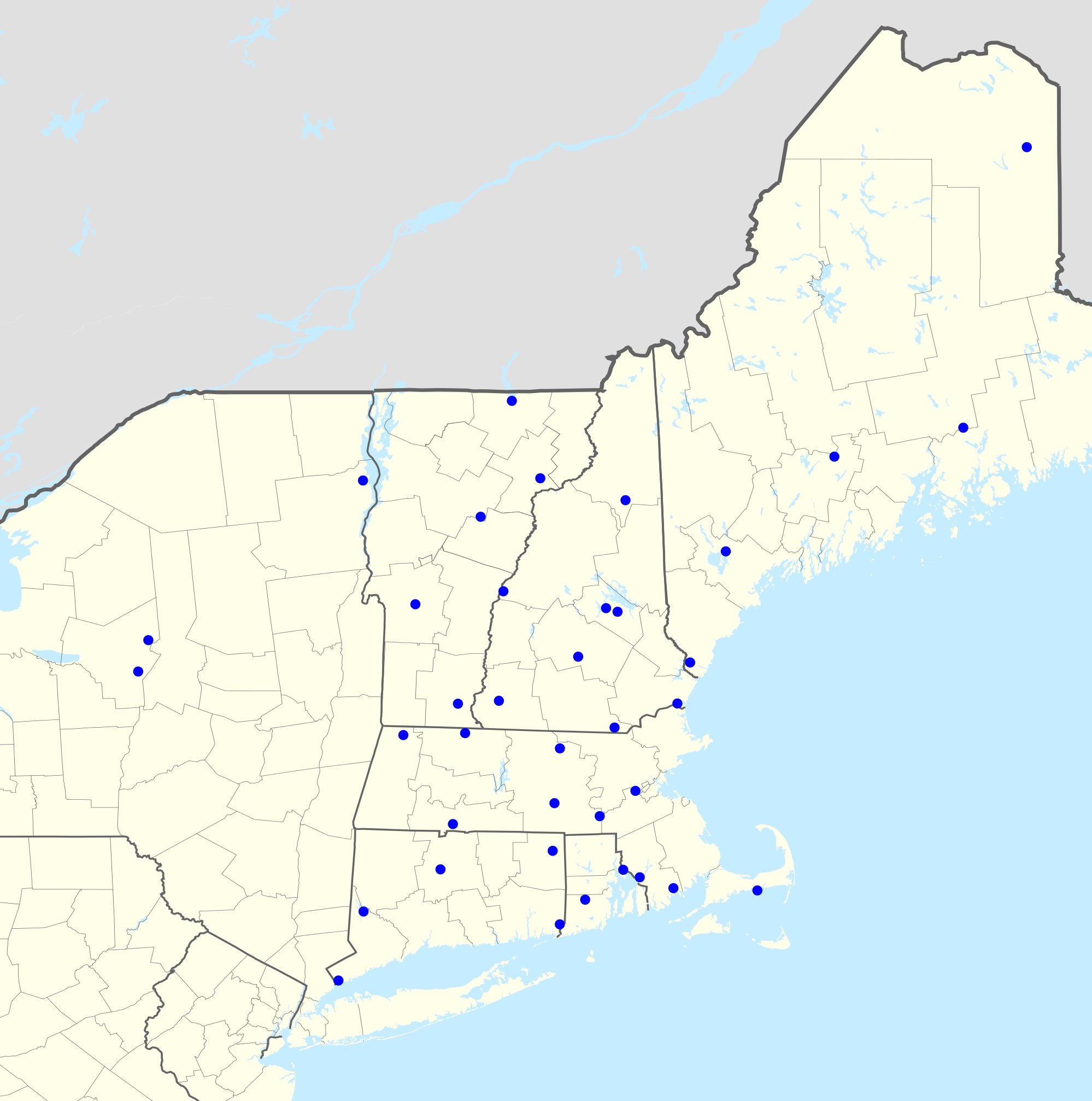
Map of radio affiliates.

== Station list ==
Callsign	Frequency	Band	City	State	Network status
WBZ-FM	98.5	FM	Boston	Massachusetts	Flagship
WEBB	98.5	FM	Waterville	Maine	Affiliate
W243AT	96.5	FM	Barre	Vermont	WDEV-FM relay
WINQ	1490	AM	Brattleboro	Vermont	Affiliate
WTSV	1230	AM	Claremont	New Hampshire	Affiliate
W232DN	94.3	FM	Claremont	New Hampshire	WTSV relay
W246DT	97.1	FM	Colchester	Vermont	WEAV relay
WWMJ	95.7	FM	Ellsworth/Bangor	Maine	Affiliate
WCPV	101.3	FM	Essex	New York	Affiliate
WSAR	1480	AM	Fall River	Massachusetts	Affiliate
W240EB	95.9	FM	Fall River	Massachusetts	WSAR relay
WPKZ	1280	AM	Fitchburg	Massachusetts	Affiliate
W287BT	105.3	FM	Fitchburg	Massachusetts	WPKZ relay
WPVQ-FM	95.3	FM	Greenfield	Massachusetts	Affiliate
WGCH	1490	AM	Greenwich	Connecticut	Affiliate
WSAK	102.1	FM	Hampton	New Hampshire	Affiliate
WTIC	1080	AM	Hartford	Connecticut	Affiliate
WTIC-FM HD2	96.5-2	FM HD	Hartford	Connecticut	WTIC relay
WNNH	99.1	FM	Henniker/Concord/Manchester	New Hampshire	Affiliate
W270BR	101.9	FM	Island Pond	Vermont	WDEV-FM relay
WINQ-FM	98.7	FM	Keene	New Hampshire	Affiliate
WSHK	105.3	FM	Kittery	Maine	Affiliate
WLNH-FM	98.3	FM	Laconia	New Hampshire	Affiliate
WMRC	1490	AM	Milford	Massachusetts	Affiliate
W267CD	101.3	FM	Milford	Massachusetts	WMRC relay
W252CU	98.3	FM	Montpelier	Vermont	WDEV-FM relay
WFNQ	106.3	FM	Nashua	New Hampshire	Affiliate
WBSM	1420	AM	New Bedford	Massachusetts	Affiliate
W258DR	99.5	FM	New Bedford	Massachusetts	WBSM relay
WNAW	1230	AM	North Adams	Massachusetts	Affiliate
W234DD	94.7	FM	North Adams	Massachusetts	WNAW relay
WPKQ	103.7	FM	North Conway	New Hampshire	Affiliate
WBEC	1420	AM	Pittsfield	Massachusetts	Affiliate
W230CP	93.9	FM	Pittsfield	Massachusetts	WBEC relay
WBLM	102.9	FM	Portland	Maine	Affiliate
WOZI	101.9	FM	Presque Isle	Maine	Affiliate
WPRO	630	AM	Providence	Rhode Island	Affiliate
WPRV	790	AM	Providence	Rhode Island	Affiliate
WINY	1350	AM	Putnam	Connecticut	Affiliate
W246DN	97.1	FM	Putnam	Connecticut	WINY relay
WHTK	1280	AM	Rochester	New York	Affiliate
WDVT	94.5	FM	Rutland	Vermont	Affiliate
WAQY	102.1	FM	Springfield	Massachusetts	Affiliate
W288DL	105.5	FM	Stamford	Connecticut	WGCH relay
W235AV	94.9	FM	Tatnuck	Massachusetts	WTAG relay
WEAN-FM	99.7	FM	Wakefield-Peacedale	Rhode Island	Affiliate
WDEV-FM	96.1	FM	Warren	Vermont	Affiliate
WDEV	550	AM	Waterbury	Vermont	Affiliate
WXTK	95.1	FM	West Yarmouth/Cape Cod	Massachusetts	Affiliate
W233CC	94.5	FM	White River Junction	Vermont	WTSV relay
WTAG	580	AM	Worcester	Massachusetts	Affiliate

- Blue background indicates FM translator.
- Gray background indicates station is a simulcast of another station.

=== Former affiliates (188 stations) ===
==== United States ====
===== Alabama =====
- WTGZ 95.9: Tuskegee, Alabama
- WQSI 93.9: Union Springs, Alabama

===== Connecticut =====
- WGAB 1550: Bloomfield, Connecticut
- WINE 940: Brookfield, Connecticut
- WRKI 95.1: Brookfield, Connecticut
- WLAD 800: Danbury, Connecticut
- WSUB 980: Groton, Connecticut
- WCCC-FM 106.9: Hartford, Connecticut
- WDRC 1360: Hartford, Connecticut
- WPOP 1410: Hartford, Connecticut
- WZMX 93.7: Hartford, Connecticut
- WNEZ 910: New Britain, Connecticut
- WNHC 1340: New Haven, Connecticut
- WNLC 1510: New London, Connecticut
- WMOS 104.7: New London, Connecticut
- WLIS 1420: Old Saybrook, Connecticut
- WREF 850: Ridgefield, Connecticut
- WNTY 990: Southington, Connecticut
- WMOS 102.3: Stonington, Connecticut
- WWCO 1240: Waterbury, Connecticut
- WCCC 1290: West Hartford, Connecticut
- WILI 1400: Willimantic, Connecticut
- WUCS 97.9: Windsor Locks, Connecticut

===== Florida =====
- WSBR 740: Boca Raton, Florida
- WIOD 610: Miami, Florida
- WMEN 640: Royal Palm Beach, Florida

===== Maine =====
- WEZW 1400: Augusta, Maine
- WFAU 1340: Augusta, Maine
- WABI 910: Bangor, Maine
- WEZQ 92.9: Bangor, Maine
- WZON 620: Bangor, Maine
- WMDI 107.7: Bar Harbor, Maine
- WJTO 730: Bath, Maine
- WBME 1230: Belfast, Maine
- WIDE 1400: Biddeford, Maine
- WNSW 1200: Brewer, Maine
- WKIT-FM 100.3: Brewer, Maine
- WKXA 900: Brunswick, Maine
- WQDY 1230: Calais, Maine
- WQSS 102.5: Camden, Maine
- WCRQ 102.9: Dennysville, Maine
- WDME 1340: Dover-Foxcroft, Maine
- WDME-FM 103.1: Dover-Foxcroft, Maine
- WDEA 1370: Ellsworth, Maine
- WABK 104.3: Gardiner, Maine
- WKZN 870: Gorham, Maine
- WHOU-FM 100.1: Houlton, Maine
- WTME 1240: Lewiston, Maine
- WLAM 1470: Lewiston, Maine
- WLKN 1450: Lincoln, Maine
- WLKN-FM 99.3: Lincoln, Maine
- WALZ-FM 95.3: Machias, Maine
- WSJR 1230: Madawaska, Maine
- WTBM 100.7: Mexico, Maine
- WMKR 1240: Millinocket, Maine
- WOXO-FM 92.7: Norway, Maine
- WZAN 970: Portland, Maine
- WGAN 560: Portland, Maine
- WPOR 1490: Portland, Maine
- WEGP 1390: Presque Isle, Maine
- WAGM 950: Presque Isle, Maine
- WRKD 1450: Rockland, Maine
- WMCM 103.3: Rockland, Maine
- WRUM 780: Rumford, Maine
- WCDQ 92.1: Sanford, Maine
- WFZX 101.7: Searsport, Maine
- WHQO 107.9: Skowhegan, Maine
- WSKW 1160: Skowhegan, Maine
- WKTQ 1450: South Paris, Maine
- WYNZ 100.9: South Portland, Maine
- WTVL 1490: Waterville, Maine
- WJAE 1440: Westbrook, Maine
- WNSX 97.7: Winter Harbor, Maine
- WXHT 95.3: York Center, Maine

===== Massachusetts =====
- WRNX 100.9: Amherst, Massachusetts
- WTTT 1430: Amherst, Massachusetts
- WAHL 99.9: Athol, Massachusetts
- WARA 1320: Attleboro, Massachusetts
- WBCN 104.1: Boston, Massachusetts
- WBZ 1030: Boston, Massachusetts
- WEEI 590: Boston, Massachusetts
- WHDH 850: Boston, Massachusetts
- WCAV 97.7: Brockton, Massachusetts
- WBOS 92.9: Brookline, Massachusetts
- WCIB 101.9: Falmouth, Massachusetts
- WFGL 960: Fitchburg, Massachusetts
- WGAW 1340: Gardner, Massachusetts
- WBOQ 104.9: Gloucester, Massachusetts
- WSBS 860: Great Barrington, Massachusetts
- WHAI 1240: Greenfield, Massachusetts
- WGAM 1520: Greenfield, Massachusetts
- WHAV 1490: Haverhill, Massachusetts
- WLLH 1400: Lawrence, Massachusetts
- WHMP 1400: Northampton, Massachusetts
- WHMP-FM 93.3: Northampton, Massachusetts
- WBEC-FM 105.5: Pittsfield, Massachusetts
- WBRK 1340: Pittsfield, Massachusetts
- WUHN 1110: Pittsfield, Massachusetts
- WUPE 95.9: Pittsfield, Massachusetts
- WPLM 1390: Plymouth, Massachusetts
- WHYN 560: Springfield, Massachusetts
- WMAS 1450: Springfield, Massachusetts
- WSPR 1270: Springfield, Massachusetts
- WARE 1250: Ware, Massachusetts
- WGFP 940: Webster, Massachusetts
- WTXL 1490: West Springfield, Massachusetts
- WOCB 1240: West Yarmouth, Massachusetts
- WINQ 97.7: Winchendon, Massachusetts
- WNEB 1230: Worcester, Massachusetts
- WORC 1310: Worcester, Massachusetts
- WWFX 100.1: Worcester, Massachusetts

===== Nebraska =====
- KRNP 100.7: Sutherland, Nebraska

===== New Hampshire =====
- WBRL 1400: Berlin, New Hampshire
- WMOU 1230: Berlin, New Hampshire
- WKXL 1450: Concord, New Hampshire
- WBNC 1050: Conway, New Hampshire
- WMWV 93.5: Conway, New Hampshire
- WDER 1320: Derry, New Hampshire
- WFTN 1240: Franklin, New Hampshire
- WSTL 1400: Hanover, New Hampshire
- WTPL 107.7: Hillsborough, New Hampshire
- WKNE 1290: Keene, New Hampshire
- WKNE-HD2 106.7: Keene, New Hampshire
- WZBK 1220: Keene, New Hampshire
- W297BS 107.3: Laconia, New Hampshire
- WEMJ 1490: Laconia, New Hampshire
- WLNH 1350: Laconia, New Hampshire
- WXXK 100.5: Lebanon, New Hampshire
- WLTN 1400: Littleton, New Hampshire
- WMTK 106.3: Littleton, New Hampshire
- WFEA 1370: Manchester, New Hampshire
- WGIR 610: Manchester, New Hampshire
- WGAM 1250: Manchester, New Hampshire
- WWHQ 101.5: Meredith, New Hampshire
- WGHM 900: Nashua, New Hampshire
- WOTW-FM 106.3: Nashua, New Hampshire
- WSMN 1590: Nashua, New Hampshire
- WCNL 1010: Newport, New Hampshire
- WCNL-FM 101.7: Newport, New Hampshire
- WVRR 101.7: Newport, New Hampshire
- WPNH-FM 100.1: Plymouth, New Hampshire
- WHEB 750: Portsmouth, New Hampshire
- WTMN 1380: Portsmouth, New Hampshire
- WKOS 930: Rochester, New Hampshire
- WKOS-FM 96.7: Rochester, New Hampshire
- WLKZ 104.9: Wolfeboro, New Hampshire

===== New York =====
- WPTR 1540: Albany, New York
- WINU 104.9: Altamont, New York
- WPUT 1510: Brewster, New York
- WCKL 560: Catskill, New York
- WYUT 1420: Herkimer, New York
- WYUT-FM 92.7: Herkimer, New York
- WEAV 960: Plattsburgh, New York (also translator W290AT)
- WKDR 1070: Plattsburgh, New York
- WMNM 92.1: Port Henry, New York
- WRCK 1480: Remsen, New York
- WQBK 1300: Rensselaer, New York
- WENU 1410: South Glens Falls, New York
- W238CA 95.5: Utica, New York
- WUSP 1550: Utica, New York
- WXZO 96.7: Willsboro, New York

===== Rhode Island =====
- WKKB 100.3: Middletown, Rhode Island
- WADK 1540: Newport, Rhode Island
- WHIM 1110: Providence, Rhode Island
- WHJJ 920: Providence, Rhode Island
- WERI 1230: Westerly, Rhode Island
- WMYD 1370: Wickford, Rhode Island
- WOON 1240: Woonsocket, Rhode Island

===== Vermont =====
- WORK 107.1: Barre, Vermont
- WSNO 1450: Barre, Vermont
- WBTN 1370: Bennington, Vermont
- WEXP 101.5: Brandon, Vermont
- WKVT-FM 92.7: Brattleboro, Vermont
- WTSA 1450: Brattleboro, Vermont
- WKDR 1390: Burlington, Vermont
- WJOY 1230: Burlington, Vermont
- WMOO 92.1: Derby Center, Vermont
- WFAD 1490: Middlebury, Vermont
- WLVB 93.9: Morrisville, Vermont
- WIKE 1490: Newport, Vermont
- WWWT 1320: Randolph, Vermont
- WHWB 970: Rutland, Vermont
- WSYB 1380: Rutland, Vermont
- W257AU 99.3: St. Johnsbury, Vermont
- WSTJ 1340: St. Johnsbury, Vermont
- WCFR-FM 93.5: Springfield, Vermont
- WMXR 93.9: Woodstock, Vermont

==== U.S. territories ====
- WVWI 1000: Charlotte Amalie, U.S. Virgin Islands

== See also ==
- List of current NFL broadcasters
