= Metro Weather Service =

American forecasting service

Metro Weather Service, Inc. is a small business specializing in weather forecasting. It is based in Valley Stream, New York but has clients across North America. Metro Weather has a staff of meteorologists on-duty 24 hours a day, 7 days a week, providing accurate weather forecasts to clients all over North America.

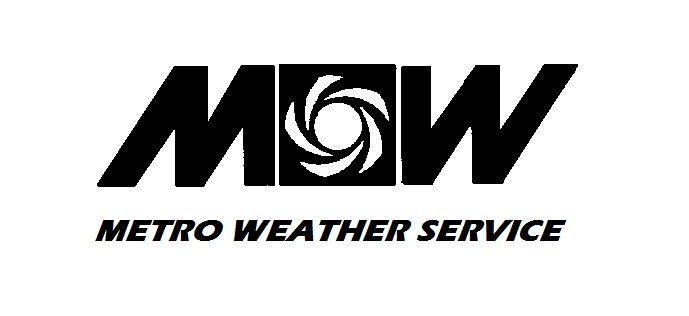
The "Metro Weather Service" logo.

== Company Overview ==
Metro Weather, Inc was formed over 40 years ago to fill a niche for businesses, radio & TV stations and others who needed timely and accurate weather information, but couldn't afford to hire a staff of qualified meteorologists. With an extensive background in communications and business management, combined with expertise in meteorology, Metro Weather quickly became an integral part of their clients operations.

Since its inception, Metro Weather has provided services to national and international companies with differing meteorological needs. It specializes in providing weather forecasts for film and television production, radio stations, utilities, snow removal companies, airports, outdoor events and concerts, transportation agencies, commercials, music videos, and major sporting events. The company also provides "forensic meteorology" to law firms and insurance companies as a consulting service for past weather.

== History ==
Metro Weather Service was founded in 1974. For nearly 15 years, the company was based on the grounds of John F. Kennedy International Airport in New York City. It moved to Valley Stream thereafter to its current address in Rockland County, New York.

For over 40 years, Metro Weather has employed many professionals in the field of weather, atmospheric science, and climate. Despite their location, their employees can be heard on several radio stations across the United States that utilize their forecasting services. Some former employees have gone on to become television meteorologists across the country, including John Bolaris, Chris Cimino and Craig Allen.

For several years, Metro Weather was the main source for weather forecasts for the Macy's Thanksgiving Day Parade.

== Current radio stations ==
- WALK-FM - WHLI - THE SHARK - B 103Long Island, New York
- WKBK, WZBK, WKNE, WSNI, WINQ-FM - Keene, New Hampshire
- WILI-FM, WILI, WXLM - eastern Connecticut
- KNDR - Bismarck, North Dakota
- WHDD - Sharon, Connecticut
- MCBI- Minnesota Christian Broadcasters - St. Paul, Minnesota and many more.
