= WINQ =

WINQ may refer to:

- WINQ (AM), a radio station (1490 AM) licensed to serve Brattleboro, Vermont, United States
- WINQ-FM, a radio station (98.7 FM) licensed to serve Winchester, New Hampshire, United States
- WSNI, a radio station (97.7 FM) licensed to serve Keene, New Hampshire, which held the call sign WINQ-FM from 1982 to 1991 and WINQ from 1991 to 2005
- WJBR (AM), a radio station (1010 AM) licensed to serve Seffner, Florida, United States, which held the call sign WINQ from 1960 to 1981
