= KICD =

KICD may refer to:

- KICD (AM), a radio station (1240 AM) licensed to Spencer, Iowa, United States
- KICD-FM, a radio station (107.7 FM) licensed to Spencer, Iowa, United States
