= WASK =

WASK may refer to:

- WASK (AM), a radio station (1450 AM) licensed to Lafayette, Indiana, United States
- WASK-FM, a radio station (98.7 FM) licensed to Battle Ground, Indiana, United States
