= WPVQ =

WPVQ may refer to:

- WPVQ-FM, a radio station (95.3 FM) licensed to serve Greenfield, Massachusetts, United States
- WQVD, a radio station (700 AM) licensed to serve Orange-Athol, Massachusetts, United States, which held the call sign WPVQ from 2019 to 2023
- WRSI, a radio station (93.9 FM) licensed to serve Turners Falls, United States, which held the call sign WPVQ from 1993 to 2001
- the ICAO code for Viqueque Airport in Viqueque, East Timor
