= WKVT =

WKVT may refer to:

- WKVT-FM, a radio station (92.7 FM) licensed to serve Brattleboro, Vermont, United States
- WINQ (AM), a radio station (1490 AM) licensed to serve Brattleboro, Vermont, which held the call sign WKVT from 1959 to 2018
