= WODJ =

WODJ may refer to:

- WLAW (AM), a radio station (1490 AM) licensed to serve Whitehall, Michigan, United States, which held the call sign WODJ from 2005 to 2009
- WTVL, a defunct radio station (1490 AM) formerly licensed to serve Waterville, Maine, United States, which held the call sign WODJ in 2004
- WTNR (FM), a radio station (107.3 FM) licensed to serve Greenville, Michigan, which held the call sign WODJ from 1989 to 2004
