= B98.5 =

B98.5 may refer to any of the following radio stations:

- KBBZ in Kalispell, Montana
- KURB in Little Rock, Arkansas
- WEBB in Waterville, Maine
- WBBO in Ocean Acres, New Jersey
- WSB-FM in Atlanta, Georgia
