= WINQ (AM) =

Radio station in Brattleboro, Vermont

- Brattleboro, Vermont; United States
- Frequency: 1490 kHz
- Branding: WINK Country

Programming
- Format: Country
- Affiliations: Premiere Networks; Westwood One

Ownership
- Owner: Saga Communications; (Saga Communications of New England, LLC)
- Sister stations: WINQ-FM; WKBK; WKVT-FM; WKNE; WRSY; WSNI; WZBK

History
- First air date: November 29, 1959 (as WKVT)
- Last air date: April 25, 2025
- Former call signs: WKVT (1959–2018)
- Call sign meaning: "wink"

Technical information
- Licensing authority: FCC
- Facility ID: 57781
- Class: C
- Power: 1,000 watts unlimited
- Transmitter coordinates: 42°50′51.3″N 72°34′54.3″W
- Translator: 106.9 W295CO (Brattleboro)

Links
- Public license information: Public file; LMS
- Webcast: Listen live
- Website: 987wink.com

WINQ (1490 kHz; "WINK Country") was an AM radio station in Brattleboro, Vermont, United States. The station was owned by Saga Communications and licensed to Saga Communications of New England, LLC; it operated as part of its Monadnock Broadcasting Group. WINQ last operated as a simulcast of the country music programming of WINQ-FM, a sister station in Keene, New Hampshire.

== History ==
The station had previously been assigned the WKVT call letters by the Federal Communications Commission (FCC).

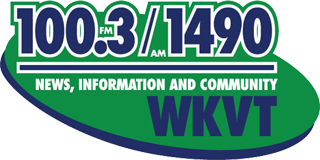
Last logo as WKVT

WKVT was part of a network of progressive talk stations throughout the northeastern United States that were owned by Saga Communications (others including WNYY in Ithaca, New York, WHMP in Northampton, Massachusetts, WHNP in East Longmeadow, Massachusetts, and WHMQ in Greenfield, Massachusetts); these, in turn, were among the last progressive talk stations still on the air in early 2017. Because of the migration of most progressive talk shows to off-air platforms, Saga announced plans to begin dropping the format in February 2017; WNYY was the first to change, followed by WHNP, with most of the other stations in the network likely to follow.

On May 30, 2018, WKVT dropped its syndicated programming, including Stephanie Miller and Thom Hartmann, and began to carry the country music programming of Keene-based WINQ; WKVT's local morning drive time program, Green Mountain Mornings, was retained following the format change. The station changed its call sign to WINQ on June 19, 2018. Green Mountain Mornings, which was hosted by Olga Peters, was cancelled in December 2018.

WINQ was taken off the air on April 25, 2025, after its translator lost its link. The FCC cancelled its license on April 3, 2026. The license of WINQ's translator W295CO (which was locked to WINQ) was also cancelled the same day.

== Translators ==
In addition to the main station, WINQ was relayed by an FM translator.

Broadcast translator for WINQ
Call sign	Frequency	City of license	FID	ERP (W)	HAAT	Class	Transmitter coordinates	FCC info
W295CO	106.9 FM	Brattleboro, Vermont	200013	85	0 m (0 ft)	D	42°50′47″N 72°41′17″W	LMS

Until December 2018, WINQ was heard on FM translator W262CL (100.3 FM). This translator thenwas converted to a soft adult contemporary station, fed via the HD2 channel of WKVT-FM (which is, in turn, a simulcast of the HD2 channel of WKNE, now a WKBK simulcast), after WINQ signed on a new translator, W295CO (106.9 FM); this translator was obtained in an FCC filing window that requires W295CO to permanently be associated with WINQ.
