= WNOR =

Radio station in Norfolk, Virginia

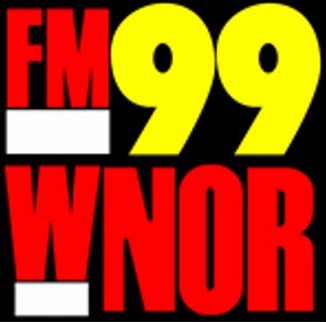
- Norfolk, Virginia; United States
- Broadcast area: Hampton Roads; Northeastern North Carolina
- Frequency: 98.7 MHz (HD Radio)
- Branding: FM99 WNOR

Programming
- Format: Active rock

Ownership
- Owner: Saga Communications; (Tidewater Communications, LLC)
- Sister stations: WAFX

History
- First air date: July 19, 1962
- Former call signs: WNOR-FM (1962–2002)
- Call sign meaning: Norfolk

Technical information
- Licensing authority: FCC
- Facility ID: 67080
- Class: B
- ERP: 46,000 watts
- HAAT: 166 meters (545 ft)
- Transmitter coordinates: 36°50′4.9″N 76°16′9.3″W

Links
- Public license information: Public file; LMS
- Webcast: Listen Live
- Website: fm99.com

WNOR (98.7 FM "FM99") is a radio station licensed to Norfolk, Virginia, United States, serving the Hampton Roads (Norfolk–Virginia Beach–Newport News) radio market. Owned by Saga Communications, the station airs an active rock radio format. The station's playlist format, as of today has a strong Mainstream Rock lean as an active rock station, similar to when they went through a format transition in February of 1996.

WNOR broadcasts in the HD Radio (hybrid) format. Studios and offices are on Greenbrier Circle in Chesapeake; the transmitter is next to Riverside Memorial Park in Norfolk. The Class B signal covers Southeastern Virginia and Northeastern North Carolina.

== History ==
On July 19, 1962, WNOR-FM first signed on the air, owned by the Norfolk Broadcasting Company. It was the sister station to WNOR (1230 AM) and presented a mix of easy listening "semiclassical music" and show tunes. WNOR-AM-FM was sold for $1.23 million in 1967 to Arnold and Audrey Malkan and Stanley Wilson. The new owners then sued the sellers, claiming among other things that WNOR-FM used equipment that did not meet Federal Communications Commission (FCC) requirements.

The station maintained an all-female air staff until 1974, when the general manager felt the concept had run its course; citing high turnover, he released two female DJs and reassigned others, telling Broadcasting, "Females and males alike would rather hear a male voice on the radio."

In 1969, WNOR-FM began airing a progressive rock format at night. Eventually, the rock music proved more popular than easy listening, with WNOR-FM abandoning the "split-format" approach in 1974. The station's Arbitron ratings quickly took off, culminating in the station's rise to number one in the rock radio ratings beginning in the early 1980s and the total-market ratings from 1986 to 1988 as well as being the market's highest-billing station from 1986 to 1993.

By the 1980s, the station had moved to an album-oriented rock format, based more on album sales than the previous progressive rock format. In 1980, Marvin Josephson Associates acquired the WNOR stations; company president Ed Christian led a leveraged buyout of the Josephson radio stations in 1986, forming Saga Communications. Saga decided to simulcast the FM station's rock format on the AM station. WNOR gained notoriety in 1992 when, as an April Fool's Day prank, it claimed that the Mount Trashmore landfill in Virginia Beach was about to explode; callers jammed the 9-1-1 telephone system in the area, and the station apologized at the behest of local police. Saga then suspended the morning show hosts for two weeks in an effort to show, per CEO Ed Christian, that the station was "taking very seriously its obligation to refrain from deliberate distortion or falsification of programming"; later that year, the FCC admonished the station.

In 1994, Saga Communications acquired another FM station in the market, WAFX in Suffolk. WAFX had flipped to classic rock in 1989, with the two stations feuding over the use of the term in the market, and the new station made a dent in WNOR's ratings. While WAFX shifted to classic hits, WNOR-FM evolved into being an active rock-leaning mainstream rock station, distancing their playlist from WAFX, focusing in on newer artists in hard rock and heavy metal into their playlist rotation which resulted in the station intentionally transitioning into the active rock format; the changeover in music programming was completed in February of 1996, the station had improved ratings and grew to major popularity during the late 1990's and the entire 2000's aiding in the success of the active rock format since the initial transition completed in 1996 and still retained the mainstream rock lean in the process making the station successfully balanced, compared to WAFX. In 1999, the AM station went to an adult standards format and changed its call sign to WJOI.

In 2019, Saga demolished the tower used to transmit WNOR and WJOI for 48 years; the new 545-foot (166 m) mast was completed in January 2020.
