= WJYI (AM) =

Radio station in Norfolk, Virginia (1949–2021)

- Norfolk, Virginia; United States
- Broadcast area: Hampton Roads
- Frequency: 1230 kHz

Ownership
- Owner: Saga Communications; (Tidewater Communications, LLC)
- Sister stations: WAFX; WNOR

History
- First air date: May 1, 1949
- Last air date: September 30, 2021
- Former call signs: WNOR (1949–1986); WKLR (1986–1986); WNOR (1986–1989); WJOI (1999–2021)
- Call sign meaning: "Joy"

Technical information
- Facility ID: 67081
- Class: C
- Power: 627 watts (unlimited)
- Transmitter coordinates: 36°50′4.53″N 76°16′9.78″W
- Repeater: WNOR 98.7-HD2

WJYI (1230 kHz) was a soft oldies and adult standards formatted radio station licensed to Norfolk, Virginia, United States and served the Hampton Roads region of Virginia. WJYI was owned by Saga Communications and operated under their Tidewater Communications, LLC licensee. It featured programming from "America's Best Music" syndicated by Westwood One.

== History ==
Final logo as "Joy FM 98.7 HD2"

On May 1, 1949, the station first signed on the air. The original call sign was WNOR. The WJOI call letters and those of co-owned WJYI in Milwaukee swapped on April 29, 2021.

On September 30, 2021, WJYI's license was surrendered to the FCC.

== Transmission ==
WJYI was a Class C station, transmitting with 627 watts, using a non-directional antenna. The station's transmitter was off East Indian River Road in Norfolk, near the Campostella Bridge. Programming continues to be heard on a digital subchannel of sister station WNOR 98.7-HD2.
