= WHMP =

Radio station in Northampton, Massachusetts

- Northampton, Massachusetts; United States
- Broadcast area: Pioneer Valley
- Frequency: 1400 kHz
- Branding: NewsTalk WHMP

Programming
- Format: News/talk
- Affiliations: ABC News Radio; Compass Media Networks; Westwood One

Ownership
- Owner: Saga Communications; (Saga Communications of New England, LLC)
- Sister stations: WRSI

History
- First air date: December 4, 1950
- Call sign meaning: Hampshire County

Technical information
- Licensing authority: FCC
- Facility ID: 46962
- Class: C
- Power: 1,000 watts unlimited
- Transmitter coordinates: 42°19′36.32″N 72°39′26.33″W
- Translator: 101.5 W268CZ (Northampton)
- Repeater: 93.9 WRSI-HD2 (Turners Falls)

Links
- Public license information: Public file; LMS
- Webcast: Listen live
- Website: www.whmp.com

WHMP (1400 AM) is a commercial radio station broadcasting a news/talk format. Licensed to Northampton, Massachusetts, United States, it serves the Pioneer Valley, with studios on Hampton Avenue. WHMP is owned by Saga Communications, and operates as part of its Northampton Radio Group.

WHMP is powered at 1,000 watts, using a non-directional antenna. Its programming is also heard on FM translator station W268CZ at 101.5 MHz in Northampton, and on an HD Radio digital subchannel of WRSI (93.9 FM) in Turners Falls.

== History ==
WHMP signed on the air in December 4, 1950, as Northampton's first radio station. For much of its early decades, it aired a full service format of middle of the road (MOR) music, news, talk and sports. It had been an affiliate of the ABC Information Network. In 1965, it added an FM sister station, WHMP-FM 99.3.

During the 2000s and 2010s, WHMP was simulcast on WHMQ (1240 AM) in Greenfield and WHNP (1600 AM) in East Longmeadow. WHNP and WHMQ previously simulcast sister FM stations; WHNP was a simulcast of WAQY-FM (as WAQY, WMRE, and WPNT) until 2000 (it carried a promotional loop for Six Flags New England for several months after dropping the WAQY simulcast), while WHMQ repeated WHAI-FM (as WHAI) until 2001.

WHMP's network of stations constituted part of a network of progressive talk stations throughout the northeastern United States that were owned by Saga Communications (others included WNYY in Ithaca, New York, and WKVT in Brattleboro, Vermont); these, in turn, were among the last progressive talk stations still on the air in early 2017. Because of the migration of most progressive talk shows to off-air platforms, Saga announced plans to drop the format from WNYY in Ithaca effective February 1, 2017; WHNP received WNYY's translator under a policy that allows translators to be moved up to 250 miles from their original city of license. On February 3, 2017, following the translator's move, WHNP dropped out of the simulcast with WHMP and became WLZX, a simulcast of WLZX-FM (the former WHMP-FM).

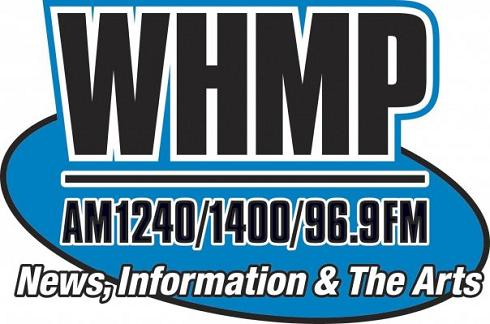
Logo used with 96.9 translator

WHMP was previously carried on translator W245BK (96.9 FM) in Amherst. Following the launch of W268CZ, the 96.9 facility was repurposed as an oldies station, fed by the HD3 channel of WLZX-FM, in June 2018. Until February 1, 2021, WHMQ in Greenfield had its own translator, W298CA (107.5 FM); that facility then launched a soft adult contemporary format originating from the HD2 channel of WPVQ-FM.

Saga Communications surrendered WHMQ's license to the Federal Communications Commission on March 20, 2023, and it was deleted the same day.

== Programming ==
Weekdays begin with news, talk and information shows hosted by Jess Tyler, Bill Newman and Buz Eisenberg. The rest of the schedule is nationally syndicated talk programs: The Stephanie Miller Show, The Thom Hartmann Show, The Ramsey Show with Dave Ramsey, Armstrong & Getty, John Batchelor, America at Night and This Morning, America's First News with Gordon Deal.

Weekends feature specialty shows on health, pets, technology, travel, cars and gardening. Syndicated programs include The Kim Komando Show, The Car Doctor with Ron Ananian, World Travel with Rudy Maxa, Rich DeMuro on Tech, The Lars Larson Show, along with a Sunday morning polka music show and a Sunday evening old-time radio show.

== Translators ==
Broadcast translator for WHMP
Call sign	Frequency	City of license	FID	ERP (W)	Class	Transmitter coordinates	FCC info
W268CZ	101.5 FM	Northampton, Massachusetts	200012	175	D	42°21′49.3″N 72°25′22.3″W	LMS
