= WTVL =

Radio station in Waterville, Maine, United States

- Waterville, Maine; United States
- Broadcast area: Kennebec County, Maine
- Frequency: 1490 kHz
- Branding: Kool AM 1490

Programming
- Format: Adult standards

Ownership
- Owner: Townsquare Media; (Townsquare License, LLC)
- Sister stations: WEBB; WJZN; WMME-FM

History
- First air date: June 19, 1946
- Last air date: December 31, 2022
- Former call signs: WODJ (2004)
- Call sign meaning: Waterville

Technical information
- Licensing authority: FCC
- Facility ID: 52607
- Class: C
- Power: 1,000 watts
- Transmitter coordinates: 44°33′51.2″N 69°36′37.2″W

Links
- Public license information: Public file; LMS
- Webcast: Listen live
- Website: koolam.com

WTVL (1490 kHz "Kool AM 1490") was a commercial AM radio station licensed to serve Waterville, Maine, and serving Kennebec County. The station was owned by Townsquare Media and until December 31, 2022, it broadcast an adult standards radio format, playing softer hits from the 1950s, 1960s, 1970s, and 1980s. The station featured the music of Frank Sinatra, Barbra Streisand, Nat King Cole and Dionne Warwick in its playlist.

WTVL’s transmitter power output was 1,000 watts. The transmitter was off Benton Avenue in Winslow. The studios and offices were on Western Avenue in Augusta.

== History ==
On June 19, 1946, WTVL first signed on as an ABC network affiliate owned by Kennebec Broadcasting Company. WTVL carried ABC's schedule of dramas, comedies, news, sports, soap operas, game shows and big band broadcasts during the "Golden Age of Radio".

An FM sister station went on the air March 26, 1968, at 98.3 FM, simulcasting WTVL's programming. WTVL-AM-FM had a middle of the road format and carried news from the ABC Entertainment network. In 1984, the station shifted to an adult contemporary format.

The following year, WTVL changed to a nostalgia format programmed separately from the FM station, which had moved to 98.5 FM and had become adult contemporary station WDBX. In 1987, WDBX returned to the WTVL-FM call sign, and the two stations resumed simulcasting with an oldies format.

E.H. Close, owner of WPNH AM-FM in Plymouth, New Hampshire, and WKNE AM-FM in Keene, New Hampshire, bought WTVL and WTVL-FM from Kennebec Broadcasting for $1.29 million in 1988. By 1990, the stations had changed to a soft rock format. In 1993, WTVL-FM became country music station WEBB; the simulcast on WTVL continued, even though the AM call sign was not changed.

Pilot Communications bought WTVL and WEBB for $450,000 in 1994. Pilot's radio stations were acquired by Citadel Broadcasting in 1999 as part of its purchase of parent company Broadcasting Partners Holdings. In January 2003, Citadel ended WTVL's simulcast of WEBB and switched the station to an adult standards format, simulcast with sister station WEZW (1400 AM, now WJZN) in Waterville under the "Kool" branding. The call sign was changed to WODJ on November 26, 2004; on December 8, the WTVL call sign returned.

Citadel merged with Cumulus Media on September 16, 2011. Townsquare Media acquired Cumulus' Augusta/Waterville stations in 2012. The simulcast with WJZN ended on July 14, 2016, when that station changed to a classic rock format.

On December 31, 2022, WTVL went silent. Townsquare Media surrendered the station's license to the Federal Communications Commission on December 29, 2023, which cancelled it on January 8, 2024.
