= WXXB =

Radio station in Delphi, Indiana

Coordinates: 40.5034°N 86.7250°W

- Delphi, Indiana; United States
- Broadcast area: Lafayette metropolitan area
- Frequency: 102.9 MHz
- Branding: B102.9

Programming
- Format: Top 40 (CHR)
- Affiliations: Compass Media Networks; Premiere Networks

Ownership
- Owner: Saga Communications; (Saga Communications, LLC)
- Sister stations: WASK; WASK-FM; WKHY; WKOA

History
- First air date: 1989 (as WNJY)
- Former call signs: WNJY (1989–2001)

Technical information
- Licensing authority: FCC
- Facility ID: 72676
- Class: A
- ERP: 4,000 watts
- HAAT: 125 meters (410 ft)

Links
- Public license information: Public file; LMS
- Webcast: Listen live
- Website: b1029.com

WXXB (102.9 FM "B102-9") is a radio station licensed to Delphi, Indiana, United States, and serving the Lafayette metropolitan area. Owned by Saga Communications, its studios are located at 3575 McCarty Lane in Lafayette, Indiana. The tower is located in rural Northeastern Tippecanoe County near the town of Buck Creek, Indiana.

== History ==
WXXB signed on the air in early 1989 as WNJY, Joy 103, featuring an oldies format. In the mid-1990s, Joy 103 renamed itself "Oldies 103" and began aiming programming toward the Lafayette market using the top of the hour station identification "WNJY-FM and AM, Delphi/Monticello...Lafayette's New Oldies Station!" followed by an "Oldies 103!" sing. As Oldies 103, the station featured mainly network programming from Jones Radio Networks' Goodtime Oldies format with the exception of Rich Anthony's local midday shift. The station earned respectable ratings in Lafayette, according to Arbitron in the mid-90s, which ultimately lead WASK-A/F to drop their news/talk format in favor of oldies in 1997. When WNJY was sold to RadioWorks in 1999, the station moved to Lafayette and programming from Goodtime Oldies was dropped. Shortly thereafter, RadioWorks requested a construction permit to move the station's tower closer to Lafayette, which got approved.

While the tower was being built, there was speculation around the market as to what RadioWorks would do with their move-in frequency. WASK-FM already had the market cornered in oldies with high school oldies station WJEF being a very distant second place among listeners. Initially, the new station was going to become Rhythmic Contemporary Hit Radio as 102-9 The Beat. However, with the growing popularity of crosstown mainstream CHR outlet, WAZY, it was determined that the station would sign on with Contemporary hit radio with a Rhythmic Lean and go into a head-to-head battle with the 50,000 watt station. Once the tower was built in northeastern Tippecanoe County and began broadcasting from that location, WXXB, The New B102-9, signed on in June 2001.

To this day, B102-9 gets very respectable numbers among its core demo, particularly 12- to 24- and 18- to 34-year-old females. In the most recent ratings run for Spring 2006, WXXB beat Heritage CHR WAZY-FM in the Male/Female 12- to 17-year-old demo and took first place with men 18 to 34 in that demo for the first time.

Schurz Communications announced on September 14, 2015, that it would exit broadcasting and sell its television and radio stations, including WXXB, to Gray Television for $442.5 million. Though Gray initially intended to keep Schurz' radio stations, on November 2, it announced that Neuhoff Communications would acquire WXXB and Schurz' other Lafayette radio stations for $8 million.

On February 13, 2024, Neuhoff Communications sold its Lafayette radio cluster to Saga Communications for $5.3 million.

== Programming ==
WXXB stayed true to the Top 40 format for eight years. In January 2010, B102-9 began playing a Top 40 format, similar to SiriusXM's The Pulse, while continuing to brand itself, Today's Hit Music. The station also features live and local air personalities through many dayparts, including weekends. Syndicated programming features Ryan Seacrest.

== Incidents and accidents ==
On April 13, 2011, two workers, Paul Aliff and Ernest Garcia, were killed when they fell 340 feet (100 m) from the WXXB transmission tower. The workers were part of a 5-person team from Electronic Resource Inc (ERI), who were extending the height of the tower. After a workplace safety investigation by Occupational Safety and Health Administration, ERI was fined $91,500 for unsafe practices that led to the deaths.
