= KJBX =

Radio station in Cash, Arkansas

- Cash, Arkansas; United States
- Broadcast area: Jonesboro metropolitan area
- Frequency: 106.3 MHz (HD Radio)
- Branding: Mix 106.3

Programming
- Format: Hot adult contemporary
- Subchannels: HD2: Classic country "98.5 The Outlaw"
- Affiliations: Premiere Networks

Ownership
- Owner: Saga Communications; (Saga Communications of Arkansas, LLC)
- Sister stations: KEGI; KDXY

History
- First air date: 1991 (as KWEZ at 106.7)
- Former call signs: KIHW (January–March 1990, CP); KWEZ (1990–1994); KKCN (1994–1997)
- Former frequencies: 106.7 MHz (1991–2011)

Technical information
- Licensing authority: FCC
- Facility ID: 18085
- Class: C3
- ERP: 25,000 watts
- HAAT: 95 meters (312 ft)
- Transmitter coordinates: 35°44′51″N 90°37′49″W
- Translators: 98.5 K253BQ (Jonesboro, relays HD2)

Links
- Public license information: Public file; LMS
- Webcast: Listen live; Listen live (HD2)
- Website: mix1063.com; 985theoutlaw.com (HD2)

KJBX (106.3 FM) is a radio station broadcasting a hot adult contemporary format. Licensed to Cash, Arkansas, United States, it serves the Jonesboro metropolitan area. The station is owned by Saga Communications, and operates as part of its Jonesboro Media Group.

== Programming ==
KAIT's K8 News 6pm newscast is simulcast Monday through Friday.

== KJBX-HD2 ==
KJBX's second HD Radio subchannel broadcasts "98.5 The Outlaw", with a classic country format. Its programming is carried on K253BQ (98.5 FM) in Jonesboro.
