= WBSM =

- New Bedford, Massachusetts; United States
- Broadcast area: New Bedford–Fall River
- Frequency: 1420 kHz
- Branding: 1420 WBSM

Programming
- Format: News/talk/sports
- Affiliations: ABC News Radio; Salem Radio Network; Westwood One; Boston Red Sox Radio Network; New England Patriots Radio Network

Ownership
- Owner: Townsquare Media; (Townsquare License, LLC)
- Sister stations: WFHN

History
- First air date: July 17, 1949
- Former frequencies: 1230 kHz (1949–1956)

Technical information
- Licensing authority: FCC
- Facility ID: 10452
- Class: B
- Power: 5,000 watts day; 1,000 watts night
- Transmitter coordinates: 41°39′2.38″N 70°54′56.14″W
- Translator: 99.5 W258DR (New Bedford)

Links
- Public license information: Public file; LMS
- Webcast: Listen live
- Website: wbsm.com

WBSM (1420 AM) is a radio station broadcasting in the New Bedford–Fall River market area with a news/talk/sports format. WBSM is under ownership of Townsquare Media, with studios in Fairhaven shared with WFHN.

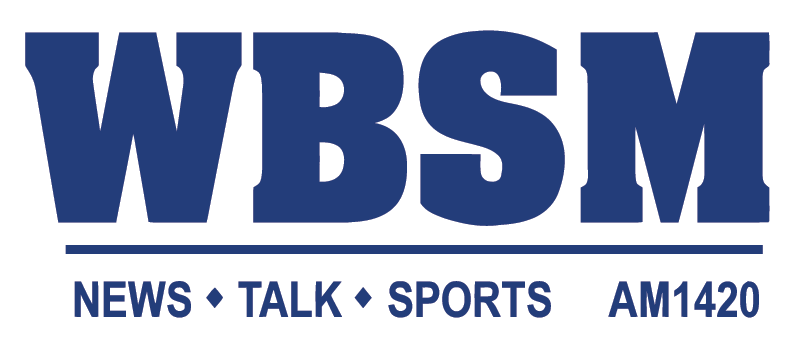
Former logo

== News and weather ==
WBSM had a five-person news team in 2016, headed by Taylor Cormier. Anchors and reporters were Cormier, Tim Weisberg, Greg Desrosiers, Jim Phillips and Jim Marshall. Following the departure of Desroisers and Marshall, the station's news team added Tim Weisberg as afternoon news anchor, and Tim Dunn as a reporter.

Cormier departed the WBSM newsroom in May 2019, joining the Howie Carr Show as the political talk program's producer.

Over the past year, the station's news department has seen frequent changes, ultimately dwindling down to a newsroom staffed by just two people as of November 2019.

The station is an affiliate of ABC News Radio for national and world news. Local weather reports are provided by ABC television affiliate WLNE-TV.

== Talk and sports ==
Local personalities include Tim Weisberg, Chris McCarthy, Barry Richard, Ken Pittman, Brian Thomas, and Jim Phillips. Syndicated programs include America in the Morning, The Howie Carr Show, The Mark Levin Show, Charlie Kirk, and Hugh Hewitt.

The station broadcasts Boston Red Sox and New England Patriots games.

== Notable alumni ==
- André Bernier: Weekend weather anchor (1975–1977). André was the first weather anchor seen on The Weather Channel and currently with WJW in Cleveland, Ohio.
- Pete Braley: morning show host and program director (1989–2014),
- Henry Carreiro: Daytime talk show host during the 1970s, 1980s and 1990s, he also had a speaking role in Jaws as a loudmouth fisherman who among other one-liners tells Matt Hooper to "walk straight ahead" in response to the question about a good hotel or restaurant on the island. (deceased)
- Don Gillis: Sports director (1949–1951), commentator for Red Sox, Boston Celtics, and Bruins broadcasts on WHDH AM 850 (now WEEI) (1950s-1960s), sports director for Channel 5 Boston (1962–1983), host of Candlepin Bowling (1967–1996) (deceased)
- Hal Peterson: Host of "Open Line" from the mid-1950s and thru various periods in the 1960s and 1970s. Hal was the creator of the long-running charity "Quarters for Christmas". It was Hal Peterson that was responsible for giving Gil Santos his first job in radio as Hal's "Color Man" during New Bedford High School basketball broadcasts. (deceased)
- Jack Peterson: news anchor, play-by-play announcer for local sports (1998–2014) (deceased)
- Stan Lipp: Host of "Open Line" from 1964-2001. (deceased)
- Gil Santos: Sports reporter (1950s), play-by-play announcer for Patriots radio broadcasts (1966–2013) (deceased)

== Translator ==
Call sign	Frequency	City of license	FID	ERP (W)	Class	Transmitter coordinates	FCC info
W258DR	99.5 FM	New Bedford, Massachusetts	202288	128	D	41°38′25.4″N 70°55′1.1″W	LMS
