= KMRR =

Radio station in Spencer, Iowa

- Spencer, Iowa; United States
- Broadcast area: Forest City, Iowa; Estherville, Iowa
- Frequency: 104.9 MHz (HD Radio)
- Branding: More 104.9

Programming
- Format: Adult contemporary
- Subchannels: HD2: Oldies
- Affiliations: Premiere Networks

Ownership
- Owner: Saga Communications; (Saga Communications of Iowa, LLC)
- Sister stations: KICD; KICD-FM

History
- First air date: 1979
- Former call signs: KRGS (1979–1985); KJJG (1985–1993); KIGL (1993–2000); KLLT (2000–2014)
- Call sign meaning: More Radio

Technical information
- Licensing authority: FCC
- Facility ID: 29080
- Class: C3
- ERP: 25,000 watts
- HAAT: 85 meters (279 ft)
- Transmitter coordinates: 43°17′13″N 95°8′34″W
- Translators: HD2: 98.3 K252EX (Spencer); HD2: 98.5 K253CV (Spirit Lake)

Links
- Public license information: Public file; LMS
- Webcast: Listen live; Listen live (HD2)
- Website: more1049.com; pureoldies983.com (HD2)

KMRR (104.9 FM) is a radio station airing an adult contemporary format in Spencer, Iowa, United States. The station serves the areas of Spencer, Iowa, and Estherville, Iowa, and is owned by Saga Communications as part of its Spencer Radio Group.

== KMRR-HD2 ==
On June 29, 2018, KMRR launched an oldies format on its HD2 subchannel, branded as "Pure Oldies 98.3" (simulcast on translator K252EX 98.3 FM Spencer).

== KMRR-HD3 ==
On August 2, 2018, KMRR launched a variety hits format on its HD3 subchannel, branded as "98.9 Chuck FM" (simulcast on translator K253CV 98.5 FM Spirit Lake).
