= Saga Communications =

American media company

Saga Communications, Inc.
- Type: Public
- Industry: Mass media
- Genre: Radio broadcasting; Digital marketing; Television broadcasting (formerly)
- Predecessor: Morgan Murphy Media (television stations)
- Founded: 1986; 40 years ago
- Founder: Ed Christian
- Headquarters: Grosse Pointe Farms, Michigan, United States
- Key people: Chris Forgy (President/CEO); Sam Bush (Executive vice president/CFO); Cathy Bobinski (Senior vice president)
- Website: sagacom.com

Saga Communications, Inc. is an American radio broadcasting and digital marketing company founded in 1986 and based in Grosse Pointe Farms, Michigan. As of 2026, it owns and operates 82 FM, 28 AM radio stations and 78 metro signals serving 28 markets in the United States.

== History ==
On April 21, 1986, it was announced that Josephson Communications Inc. would sell its six radio stations to Saga Communications, a new company formed by Ed Christian, the president of Josephson at the time, for $38.5 million. The sale was completed on September 29.

Throughout the late 1980s and early 1990s, Saga purchased radio stations around the United States, including from Joyner Broadcasting, Sunshine Group Broadcasting, and Daniel Menghini.

In December 1992, Saga became a publicly traded company.

Saga continued to purchase more stations, including from Buckley Broadcasting, and from Great American Broadcasting.

On June 14, 1994, Saga announced that it was entering television broadcasting by purchasing KOAM-TV for $8.55 million.

In March 1997, Saga agreed to purchase WFMR and WFMI from Harris Classical Broadcasting Company and Harbish Company for $5 million.

In July 1998, it was announced that Saga would purchase another television station KAVU-TV and radio station KNAL from Withers Broadcasting for $11.875 million. Also that year, they also purchased two stations (KPUG and KAFE) from San Juan Radio Inc. for $5.825 million.

In March 1999, Saga announced they would purchase WXVT from Greenville Television; completing the sale in July for $5.2 million.

In October 1999, Saga purchased three stations (KICD, KICD-FM and KIGL) from Iowa Great Lakes Broadcasting Co. for $6.4 million.

In November 2000, Saga purchased three stations (WDXN, WABD, WCVQ and WZZB) from Southern Broadcasting Corp. for 6.7 million. Although the sales for WDXN, WADB and WCQV went through, the sale for WZZB collapsed.

In May 2012, it was announced that Saga would sell WXVT to H3 Communications for $3 million.

On May 10, 2017, Saga announced they would exit the television broadcasting business by selling its TV assets to Morgan Murphy Media for $66.6 million. The same day, Saga announced they would purchase seven FM stations, one AM station and four translators owned by Apex Media Corporation for $23 million.

In October 2018, Saga purchased four stations from Ocala Broadcasting Corporation, a subsidiary of Dix Communications for $9.3 million.

On February 14, 2024, Saga announced they would purchase the five radio stations and one translator in Lafayette, Indiana from Neuhoff Communications, Inc. for $5.3 million.

In August 2025, Saga announced they would be selling 24 broadcast tower sites. The sale was completed in October at the price of $10.7 million to GTC Towers.

On August 6, 2026, it was announced by the University of Florida College of Journalism and Communications that they had entered a new seven-year joint sales agreement with Saga effective September 1, ending their deal with Audacy, Inc. after 14 years. With the deal, Saga will manage the advertising sales for WRUF and WRUF-FM in Gainesville, Florida.

== Radio stations ==
List of radio stations owned by Saga Communications
Market	State	Station	Current format
Jonesboro	Arkansas	KDXY	Country
Jonesboro	Arkansas	KEGI	Classic rock
Jonesboro	Arkansas	KJBX	Hot adult contemporary
Ocala–Gainesville	Florida	WNDD	Classic rock
Ocala–Gainesville	Florida	WOGK	Country
Ocala–Gainesville	Florida	WYND-FM	Classic rock
Lafayette	Indiana	WASK	Sports
Lafayette	Indiana	WASK-FM	Classic hits
Lafayette	Indiana	WKHY	Active rock
Lafayette	Indiana	WKOA	Country
Lafayette	Indiana	WXXB	Contemporary hit radio
Champaign	Illinois	WLRW	Hot adult contemporary
Champaign	Illinois	WREE	Classic hits
Champaign	Illinois	WIXY	Country
Champaign	Illinois	WYXY	Classic country
Springfield	Illinois	WDBR	Contemporary hit radio
Springfield	Illinois	WLFZ	Country
Springfield	Illinois	WTAX	Talk radio
Springfield	Illinois	WTAX-FM	Talk radio
Springfield	Illinois	WYMG	Classic rock
Des Moines	Iowa	KAZR	Mainstream rock
Des Moines	Iowa	KIOA	Classic hits
Des Moines	Iowa	KOEZ	Soft adult contemporary
Des Moines	Iowa	KPSZ	Sports
Des Moines	Iowa	KRNT	Christian
Des Moines	Iowa	KSTZ	Hot adult contemporary
Spencer	Iowa	KICD	Talk radio
Spencer	Iowa	KICD-FM	Country
Spencer	Iowa	KMRR	Adult contemporary
Portland	Maine	WBAE	Soft adult contemporary
Portland	Maine	WCLZ	Adult album alternative
Portland	Maine	WGAN	Talk
Portland	Maine	WMGX	Adult top 40
Portland	Maine	WPOR	Country
Portland	Maine	WYNZ	Adult hits
Portland	Maine	WZAN	Classic country
Greenfield	Massachusetts	WHAI	Adult contemporary
Greenfield	Massachusetts	WIZZ	Oldies
Greenfield	Massachusetts	WPVQ-FM	Country
Northampton	Massachusetts	WHMP	Talk radio
Northampton	Massachusetts	WRSI	Adult album alternative
Springfield	Massachusetts	WAQY	Classic rock
Springfield	Massachusetts	WLZX-FM	Active rock
Keene	New Hampshire	WINQ-FM	Country
Keene	New Hampshire	WKBK	Talk radio
Keene	New Hampshire	WKNE	Hot adult contemporary
Keene	New Hampshire	WSNI	Adult contemporary
Keene	New Hampshire	WZBK	Classic hits
Manchester	New Hampshire	WFEA	Talk radio
Manchester	New Hampshire	WMLL	Country
Manchester	New Hampshire	WZID	Adult contemporary
Ithaca	New York	WFIZ	Contemporary hit radio
Ithaca	New York	WHCU	Talk radio
Ithaca	New York	WIII	Classic rock
Ithaca	New York	WNYY	Oldies
Ithaca	New York	WQNY	Country
Ithaca	New York	WYXL	Adult contemporary
Asheville	North Carolina	WISE	Sports
Asheville	North Carolina	WOXL-FM	Hot adult contemporary
Asheville	North Carolina	WTMT	Classic rock
Bucyrus	Ohio	WBCO	Classic country
Bucyrus	Ohio	WQEL	Classic rock
Columbus	Ohio	WLVQ	Classic rock
Columbus	Ohio	WNND	Classic hits
Columbus	Ohio	WNNP	Classic hits
Columbus	Ohio	WSNY	Adult contemporary
Columbus	Ohio	WVMX	Hot adult contemporary
Charleston	South Carolina	WAVF	Adult hits
Charleston	South Carolina	WCKN	Country
Charleston	South Carolina	WMXZ	Contemporary hit radio
Charleston	South Carolina	WSPO	Urban gospel
Charleston	South Carolina	WXST	Urban adult contemporary
Hilton Head	South Carolina	WLHH	Classic hits
Hilton Head	South Carolina	WOEZ	Soft adult contemporary
Hilton Head	South Carolina	WVSC	Adult hits
Mitchell	South Dakota	KMIT	Country
Mitchell	South Dakota	KUQL	Classic hits
Yankton	South Dakota	WNAX	Talk radio
Yankton	South Dakota	WNAX-FM	Country
Clarksville	Tennessee	WCVQ	Hot adult contemporary
Clarksville	Tennessee	WKFN	Sports
Clarksville	Tennessee	WNZE	Conservative talk
Clarksville	Tennessee	WQEZ	Regional Mexican
Clarksville	Tennessee	WRND	Classic hits
Clarksville	Tennessee	WVVR	Country
Clarksville	Tennessee	WZZP	Mainstream rock
Brattleboro	Vermont	WKVT-FM	Classic hits
Brattleboro	Vermont	WRSY	Adult album alternative
Charlottesville	Virginia	WCNR	Adult album alternative
Charlottesville	Virginia	WCVL-FM	Country
Charlottesville	Virginia	WINA	Talk radio and sports
Charlottesville	Virginia	WQMZ	Adult contemporary
Charlottesville	Virginia	WWWV	Classic rock
Harrisonburg	Virginia	WHBG	Sports
Harrisonburg	Virginia	WMQR	Hot adult contemporary
Harrisonburg	Virginia	WQPO	Contemporary hit radio
Harrisonburg	Virginia	WSIG	Classic country
Harrisonburg	Virginia	WSVA	Talk radio
Harrisonburg	Virginia	WWRE	Classic hits
Norfolk–Hampton Roads	Virginia	WAFX	Classic rock
Norfolk–Hampton Roads	Virginia	WNOR	Active rock
Bellingham	Washington	KAFE	Adult contemporary
Bellingham	Washington	KGMI	Talk radio
Bellingham	Washington	KISM	Classic rock
Bellingham	Washington	KPUG	Sports
Milwaukee	Wisconsin	WHQG	Mainstream rock
Milwaukee	Wisconsin	WJOI	Christian
Milwaukee	Wisconsin	WKLH	Classic rock
Milwaukee	Wisconsin	WJMR-FM	Urban adult contemporary
Milwaukee	Wisconsin	WRXS	Oldies

== Former stations ==
Market	State	Station	Fate	Ref(s)
Greenville	Mississippi	WXVT	Sold	
Joplin	Missouri	KFJX	Sold	
Joplin	Missouri	KOAM-TV	Sold	
Victoria	Texas	KAVU-TV	Sold	
Victoria	Texas	KMOL-LD	Sold	
Victoria	Texas	KQZY-LP	Sold	
Victoria	Texas	KUNU-LD	Sold	
Victoria	Texas	KVCT	Sold	
Victoria	Texas	KXTS-LD	Sold	
Victoria	Texas	KVTX-LP	Sold	
Brattleboro	Vermont	WINQ	Defunct	
Norfolk	Virginia	WJYI	Defunct	
Milwaukee	Wisconsin	WFMR	Defunct	
