= WKHY =

Radio station in Lafayette, Indiana

Coordinates: 40.387°N 86.969°W

- Lafayette, Indiana; United States
- Broadcast area: Lafayette metropolitan area
- Frequency: 93.5 MHz
- Branding: 93.5 KHY

Programming
- Format: Active rock

Ownership
- Owner: Saga Communications; (Saga Communications, LLC)
- Sister stations: WASK; WASK-FM; WKOA; WXXB

History
- First air date: 1970
- Former call signs: WXUS (1970–1987)
- Former frequencies: 92.7 MHz (1970–1987)
- Call sign meaning: We play the Klassic Hits just for You! (former format)

Technical information
- Licensing authority: FCC
- Facility ID: 63185
- Class: A
- ERP: 6,000 watts
- HAAT: 75 meters (246 ft)

Links
- Public license information: Public file; LMS
- Webcast: Listen live
- Website: wkhy.com

WKHY (93.5 FM, "93.5 KHY") is a commercial radio station in Lafayette, Indiana, United States. Owned by Saga Communications, the station features an active rock format, with studios located at 3575 McCarty Lane in Lafayette, Indiana.

== History ==
WKHY was originally WXUS, a radio station located at 92.7 MHz on the FM dial. The station originally carried religious/inspirational programming until the station was sold to a secular broadcaster. The format then became adult contemporary as "US 93". In addition to the AC format, the station also carried some religious programming during the late night/early morning hours to fulfill their license requirements (this continued until the station moved frequencies). In the mid-1980s, the AC format was dropped in favor of album-oriented rock. The station continued to call themselves "US 93". In the late 1980s, the station moved to 93.5 MHz as a result of a frequency reassignment which affected many stations in the 92-94 MHz band throughout North-central Indiana and East-central Illinois. Shortly after the switch, despite high ratings, the station flipped its format to classic hits due to a lack of advertising. A contest was then launched to pick the new callsign for the station. The winner chose WKHY, meaning "We play the Klassic Hits just for You!", which remain on 93.5 to this day.

Classic hits remained on the station through the early 1990s when the station segued to classic rock. WKHY would also tweak its on-air branding to "93-5 KHY". In 1996, Artistic Media Partners' fledgling country music outlet, WGBD, switched to a modern rock format giving WKHY a direct competitor. Both stations fared well with KHY winning mainly the upper end of their target demo and WGBD winning the younger end, according to Arbitron. In 2001, WGBD flipped to classic rock and now competes with WKHY for the older male demographic. KHY maintained their AOR format and, to this day, continue to be a ratings winner for males 18–49.

Due to the recent format change of WSHP, WKHY now airs Bob and Tom in the Lafayette area.

Logo under former slogan

Schurz Communications announced on September 14, 2015, that it would exit broadcasting and sell its television and radio stations, including WKHY, to Gray Television for $442.5 million. Though Gray initially intended to keep Schurz' radio stations, on November 2, it announced that Neuhoff Communications would acquire WKHY and Schurz' other Lafayette radio stations for $8 million.

On February 13, 2024, Neuhoff Communications sold its Lafayette radio cluster to Saga Communications for $5.3 million.
