= KEGI =

Radio station in Trumann, Arkansas

- Trumann, Arkansas; United States
- Broadcast area: Jonesboro metropolitan area
- Frequency: 100.5 MHz (HD Radio)
- Branding: 100.5 The Eagle ROCKS

Programming
- Format: Classic rock
- Affiliations: Westwood One; Razorbacks Sports Network from Learfield

Ownership
- Owner: Saga Communications; (Saga Communications of Arkansas, LLC)
- Sister stations: KDXY; KJBX

History
- First air date: December 30, 1986
- Former call signs: KDEZ (1985–2007)

Technical information
- Licensing authority: FCC
- Facility ID: 53473
- Class: C2
- ERP: 38,000 watts
- HAAT: 170 meters (560 ft)
- Transmitter coordinates: 35°56′58.5″N 90°39′59.3″W

Links
- Public license information: Public file; LMS
- Webcast: Listen live
- Website: www.eagle1005.com

KEGI (100.5 FM) is a radio station licensed to Trumann, Arkansas and serving Jonesboro metropolitan area. The station is owned by Saga Communications as part of its Jonesboro Media Group, broadcasting with a classic rock format.

== Previous logo ==
(KEGI's logo under previous classic hits format)
