= WHAI =

Radio station in Greenfield, Massachusetts

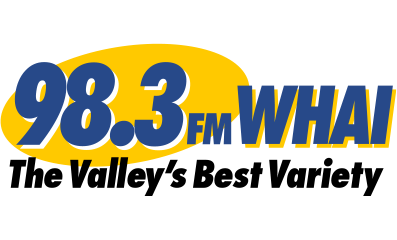
- Greenfield, Massachusetts; United States
- Broadcast area: Northern Pioneer Valley
- Frequency: 98.3 MHz
- Branding: 98.3 FM WHAI

Programming
- Format: Adult contemporary
- Affiliations: Premiere Networks

Ownership
- Owner: Saga Communications; (Saga Communications of New England, LLC)
- Sister stations: WIZZ; WPVQ-FM

History
- First air date: 15 May 1948
- Former call signs: WHAI-FM (1948–2001)
- Call sign meaning: "Haigis" (family that was WHAI's original owner)

Technical information
- Licensing authority: FCC
- Facility ID: 25833
- Class: A
- ERP: 2,000 watts
- HAAT: 123 meters (404 ft)
- Transmitter coordinates: 42.571°N 72.645°W

Links
- Public license information: Public file; LMS
- Webcast: Listen live
- Website: whai.com

WHAI (98.3 FM) is an adult contemporary radio station in Greenfield, Massachusetts, United States, owned by Saga Communications and operated as part of its Western Mass Radio Group. WHAI originated on the AM dial in 1938, adding WHAI-FM on May 15, 1948 on its 10th birthday. WHAI then became WHMQ in 2001, and began to carry different programming from the FM signal.
