= WKOA =

Radio station in Lafayette, Indiana

Coordinates: 40.402°N 86.850°W

- Lafayette, Indiana; United States
- Broadcast area: Lafayette metropolitan area
- Frequency: 105.3 MHz
- Branding: K-105

Programming
- Format: Country
- Affiliations: Westwood One

Ownership
- Owner: Saga Communications; (Saga Communications, LLC)
- Sister stations: WASK; WASK-FM; WKHY; WXXB

Technical information
- Licensing authority: FCC
- Facility ID: 71064
- Class: B
- ERP: 50,000 watts
- HAAT: 146 meters (479 ft)

Links
- Public license information: Public file; LMS
- Webcast: Listen live
- Website: wkoa.com

WKOA (105.3 FM), known as "K 105", is a radio station in Lafayette, Indiana, United States. Owned by Saga Communications, the studios are located at 3575 McCarty Lane in Lafayette with its transmitter tower at the same location.

== History ==
WKOA signed on the air as WASK-FM in 1964 featuring a Beautiful music or easy listening format. In the mid-1970s, FM radio was growing in popularity and FM stations across the country which were up to this point more of a novelty band was now being embraced for its clarity and ability to broadcast a stereo sound. WLFQ (103.9) in Crawfordsville signed-on with a country format in June 1974, directing its programming to Lafayette. WASK-FM decided to make the change to country in September 1974. It became known as "Indiana Country FM 105" utilizing Bill Robinson's "Music Works" automated radio programming service.

WASK-FM began using the slogan "K 105" in the summer of 1983 shortly after being acquired by Duchossois Communications. It retained its country music format and gradually transitioned to completely live/local programming over the next two years.

Former air personalities on K 105 include Ellen K., later known for her work with Rick Dees on KIIS Los Angeles, and Dean McNeil who became the program director of US-99 (WUSN) Chicago.

In 1994, as a result of a pending move to place a news/talk simulcast on 1450 WASK and WASK Incorporated's newly acquired WIIZ (98.7), K 105 changed call letters to WKOA. The station first achieved its #1 ranking in the fall of 1989 and has consistently ranked #1 since, according to Lafayette's Arbitron ratings.

In 2006, the station, along with sister station WASK-AM/FM, shut down its long-standing news department. On March 17, 2008, K105 and sister station WASK 98.7 formed a partnership with WLFI TV 18 to provide news content. In early April 2010, K105 started streaming online at .

Logo under previous slogan

Schurz Communications announced on September 14, 2015, that it would exit broadcasting and sell its television and radio stations, including WKOA, to Gray Television for $442.5 million. Though Gray initially intended to keep Schurz' radio stations, on November 2, it announced that Neuhoff Communications would acquire WKOA and Schurz' other Lafayette radio stations for $8 million.

On February 13, 2024, Neuhoff Communications sold its Lafayette radio cluster to Saga Communications for $5.3 million.

== Programming ==
WKOA features contemporary country music with 80s and 90s flashbacks. The station also features live and local DJs 24 hours a day with the exception of weekend specialty programming. K 105 also features NASCAR Nextel Cup racing.

WKOA's programming is led by Operations Manager Mike Shamus.

Not live and local. Shawn Parr's Across America (Syndicated) from 7p-Midnight weekdays. No air talent from midnight to 5am.
