= WFHN =

Coordinates: 41.640°N 70.917°W

- Fairhaven, Massachusetts; United States
- Broadcast area: South Coast
- Frequency: 107.1 MHz
- Branding: Fun 107

Programming
- Format: Contemporary hit radio
- Affiliations: Compass Media Networks

Ownership
- Owner: Townsquare Media; (Townsquare License, LLC)
- Sister stations: WBSM

History
- First air date: March 1, 1989
- Former call signs: WBSM-FM (1988–1989)
- Call sign meaning: Fairhaven

Technical information
- Licensing authority: FCC
- Facility ID: 10453
- Class: A
- ERP: 5,400 watts
- HAAT: 105 meters (344 ft)

Links
- Public license information: Public file; LMS
- Webcast: Listen live
- Website: fun107.com

WFHN (107.1 FM), better known as Fun 107, is a contemporary hit radio station that serves the South Coast region of Massachusetts, including New Bedford and Fall River. The station is licensed to Fairhaven, Massachusetts, and is owned by Townsquare Media. The studio is located in Fairhaven, Massachusetts, shared with WBSM. The transmitter is located in New Bedford, Massachusetts, on Pope's Island on a tower shared with W243BG. The station was originally built by broadcast engineer Randy Place in 1988–1989.

The call sign is drawn from the city of license, Fairhaven (FHN).

The radio station mainly plays pop music and has segments in between songs a few times throughout out the day where they have listeners call in to try to guess answers on riddles for prizes
