= André Bernier (meteorologist) =

American meteorologist

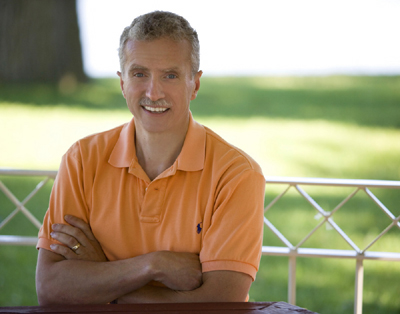
- André Bernier
- Born: André M. Bernier; May 22, 1959 (age 66); New Bedford, Massachusetts, U.S.
- Education: Bachelor of Science in Meteorology at Lyndon State College, 1981
- Occupation: Meteorologist
- Spouse: Sally Bernier
- Children: Noah Bernier
- Parent: Herve & Claire Bernier
- Website: http://www.andrebernier.com

André M. Bernier (born May 22, 1959) is an American meteorologist, formerly serving as the Cleveland-based WJW-TV's weekday evening meteorologist. He won two Emmy Awards for his weathercasts and has been at the station since February 1988, when Cleveland's very first full-length local morning newscast began. After nearly twenty years on weekday mornings, Bernier moved to the weekday prime-time on May 28, 2007.

== Early years ==
His interest in meteorology began at the age of 4 when he noticed dark clouds from an approaching storm. It was the beginning of an all-consuming passion to understand weather of all types, but during his boyhood years in New England took a particular fancy to winter snowstorms and the well-known "nor'easter."

At the age of 16, Bernier became a fixture in New Bedford radio by beginning his broadcast career supplying weekend weather forecasts to his hometown radio station, WBSM-AM. With the patient help of a number of mentors such as WBSM's Stann Lipp, Jim Loomis, Dick Stevens and newsman Jim Phillips (who is still heard on WBSM), he polished his skills as a broadcaster while continuing to educate himself in synoptic meteorology (forecasting) by shadowing Charlie Taylor, meteorologist for WLNE-TV, whose studios still resided in New Bedford in the 1970s.

== Education ==
After graduating from New Bedford High School in 1977, he attended Lyndon State College in Lyndonville, Vermont, and graduated with a Bachelor of Science in Meteorology in 1981. During his college years, he started a student-run company called "The New England Weather Net," which supplied local radio stations (including WSTJ-AM, St. Johnsbury, Vermont) with daily weather feeds by phone.

== Career ==
After graduation, he left New England to accept his first position as weekend meteorologist in Cedar Rapids, Iowa, at eastern Iowa's then premiere station, KGAN (which was known as WMT-AM-FM-TV). After only eight months, Bernier left Iowa to join the then speculative national cable channel start-up known as The Weather Channel. Bernier and Bruce Kalinowski (Edwards) were the very first on-camera meteorology team when The Weather Channel started broadcasting on Sunday, May 2, 1982, at 8:00 PM EDT.

In 1985, he moved to Minneapolis where he worked at WWTC-AM (the only commercial AM radio station in the U.S. to attempt an all-weather format), Northwest Airlines (as a trans-Atlantic flight forecaster) and eventually KARE-TV, Minneapolis, where he worked with his wife, Sally (née Patrick) during the weekday morning newscasts.

In 1988, Bernier and his family moved to Cleveland, where in the same year he began work at WJW channel 8, serving as the morning meteorologist until 2007, when he moved to evenings. In April 2024, Bernier announced his retirement effective May 22, 2024.

== Other interests ==
In addition to his activities as a television meteorologist, his faith journey began to take an increasing priority which led him to enroll in a distance-education seminary program. With completed courses from Southern Baptist Seminary in Nashville and ICU University, now known as Global University in Springfield, Missouri, he was ordained by an Ordination Council of Pastors on May 21, 2004, at Grace Community Church, Massillon, Ohio. He is an active member of Faith Family Church, North Canton, OH. He occasionally accepts invitations to other local pulpits as guest preacher and evangelist, and has served as interim pastor at churches in Massillon in 2012 and most recently in Chesterland, OH.

He is also active in digital film production, having been mentored by Hollywood film director, Jason Tomaric. Aside from a number of shorts, Bernier's filmography includes the mid-feature-length drama, "Christmas Lights In Pilaf" (2004) based on the first chapter of his Christian novel, "Welcome To Pilaf," and most recently a full-length documentary about a family from France who, with their life savings, bought an old, abandoned building in Olmsted Falls, Ohio, to open an authentic French bistro. "French Toast" (2006) has been submitted to numerous film festivals in the United States, including Utah, DC, Cleveland, and Dallas, as well as the national Telly Awards.

He has also authored several books including a faith-based Christmas novel series, "Christmas In Pilaf", and an autobiographical timeline, "The Extra Mile."

A proponent for energy conservation and renewable fuel technology including the deployment of a hydrogen vehicle, he is also noted for his opposition to the theory of anthropic causes of climate change.

In 2018, he started a podcast called The WeatherJazz Podcast where he talks about meteorology, science and off topic things.

== Awards and honors ==
- AMS Seal of Approval (#286)
- Two-time Lower Great Lakes Emmy Awards recipient
