= KDXY =

Radio station in Lake City, Arkansas

- Lake City, Arkansas; United States
- Broadcast area: Jonesboro metropolitan area
- Frequency: 104.9 MHz (HD Radio)
- Branding: 104.9 The Fox

Programming
- Format: Country
- Subchannels: HD2: Hot 107.5 (Rhythmic Top 40/CHR); HD3: EZ 92.7 FM (Soft AC)
- Affiliations: Premiere Networks

Ownership
- Owner: Saga Communications; (Saga Communications of Arkansas, LLC)
- Sister stations: KEGI; KJBX

History
- First air date: 1972 (as KHIG)
- Former call signs: KHIG (1972–1983)

Technical information
- Licensing authority: FCC
- Facility ID: 53472
- Class: C3
- ERP: 13,500 watts
- HAAT: 137 meters (449 ft)
- Transmitter coordinates: 35°49′30.4″N 90°33′54.1″W
- Translators: HD2: 107.5 K298AV (Jonesboro); HD3: 92.7 K224DW (Jonesboro)

Links
- Public license information: Public file; LMS
- Webcast: Listen live; HD2: Listen live; HD3: Listen live
- Website: thefox1049.com; HD2: hot1075.com; HD3: ez927.com

KDXY (104.9 FM, "104.9 The Fox") is a radio station broadcasting a country music format. Licensed to Lake City, Arkansas, United States, it serves the Jonesboro metropolitan area. The station is owned by Saga Communications, and is operated as part of its Jonesboro Media Group.

== KAIT morning segment ==
KDXY's Trey Stafford and Jim Frigo appear on a segment called “The Foxhole” on KAIT’s morning show, “Good Morning Region 8”. This segment is about what is happening in the community and about an interesting news story brought up by Stafford or Frigo.

== KDXY-HD2 (107.5FM K298AV Jonesboro) ==
"Hot 107.5 The Party Station" is a radio station broadcasting a Rhythmic Top 40/CHR format.

== KDXY-HD3 (92.7FM K224DW Jonesboro) ==
"EZ 92.7 FM" is a radio station broadcasting a Soft AC format.
