= Chris Cimino =

American television meteorologist

Chris Cimino (born April 27, 1961) is an American television meteorologist, currently on WPIX's early morning show 4AM-6AM. He also hosts New York Living, a new lifestyle show on WPIX.

== Career ==
=== WNBC ===
Chris was the meteorologist on WNBC television's early-morning news program, Today in New York in New York City, and was a substitute meteorologist for the NBC network's Today program.

He joined WNBC in December 1995 from WTXF-TV in Philadelphia, where he was the weekend meteorologist since January 1995. Before that, Cimino worked as a meteorologist in the Cincinnati television market and on the radio with Compu-Weather and Metro Weather Service. and WROC-TV in Rochester, New York.

On September 20, 2004, Cimino was part of an incident in which he had to give a weather report dressed in a New York Yankees baseball costume (he is a lifelong New York Mets baseball fan). The idea came after Cimino lost a bet to his eleven-year-old neighbor in which the Mets would have to win at least seventy-five games; the Mets were unsuccessful. The report ended with Cimino's colleague, sportscaster Otis Livingston, interrupting while dressed as the Mr. Met mascot, "beating up" Cimino.

During his time at WNBC he filled in for Al Roker on the Today Show, His quote to go to the local weather update was, "That's a look at the National Weather, Now here's what's happening in your backyard."

His final day at WNBC was July 2, 2019. His replacement, Maria LaRosa, started on July 29, 2019.

=== WPIX ===
On January 6, 2022, Cimino joined PIX11 News as a meteorologist and lifestyle correspondent. He made his debut on January 17, 2022, during the PIX11 Morning News from 4-6 AM and co-hosted NY Living a lifestyle show from 10-11AM. In March 2023 Cimino moved to the 4-6 PM newscasts as meteorologist as well as hosting a weekly food segment on Fridays called "Dish With Chris."
