= WMME-FM =

CHR radio station in Augusta, Maine

- Augusta, Maine; United States
- Broadcast area: South-Central Maine
- Frequency: 92.3 MHz
- Branding: 92 Moose

Programming
- Format: Top 40 (CHR)
- Affiliations: Compass Media Networks

Ownership
- Owner: Townsquare Media; (Townsquare License, LLC)
- Sister stations: WEBB; WJZN

History
- First air date: January 14, 1981
- Former call signs: WSCL (1981–1983); WRDO-FM (1983–1987)
- Former frequencies: 92.1 MHz (1981–1982)
- Call sign meaning: "Moose Maine"

Technical information
- Facility ID: 52605
- Class: B
- ERP: 50,000 watts
- HAAT: 152 meters (499 ft)
- Transmitter coordinates: 44.335°N 69.683°W

Links
- Webcast: Listen live
- Website: 92moose.fm

WMME-FM (92.3 MHz), known as "92 Moose", is a radio station located in Augusta, Maine. The station airs a top 40 (CHR) format. The station has an effective radiated power of 50,000 watts, meaning that the station can be heard across much of Central, Western, and Mid-Coast Maine. WMME's transmitter is located on U.S. Route 202, about 6 miles northeast of downtown Augusta. The station is owned by Townsquare Media.

== History ==
The station first signed on the air on January 14, 1981, as WSCL with a country format. In 1983, the station began simulcasting WRDO and changed its call sign to WRDO-FM. Both stations aired an adult contemporary music format and were affiliated with NBC's The Source. On March 9, 1987, both stations split up their simulcast when WRDO-FM flipped to Top 40/CHR as "92 Moose" is born. The station dominated the local Top 40 ratings in Augusta beating out both WGAN-FM and WIGY in a landslide throughout both the late-1980s and early-1990s.

On air personalities include Renee Nelson, Cooper Fox, Brittany Rose, Kayla Thomas and Matt James. On weekday mornings, the station airs the "Moose Morning Show" (originally known as "Rocky Shore and Bullwinkle", named after Jay Ward's Rocky and Bullwinkle), a popular morning program in Central Maine.
