= KICD (AM) =

Radio station in Spencer, Iowa

- Spencer, Iowa; United States
- Frequency: 1240 kHz
- Branding: 1240 KICD

Programming
- Format: News/talk
- Affiliations: ABC News Radio; CBS News Radio; Fox News Radio; Fox Sports Radio; Compass Media Networks; Westwood One; Minnesota Twins; Minnesota Vikings

Ownership
- Owner: Saga Communications; (Saga Communications of Iowa, LLC)
- Sister stations: KICD-FM; KMRR

History
- First air date: 1942

Technical information
- Licensing authority: FCC
- Facility ID: 29078
- Class: C
- Power: 1,000 watts unlimited
- Transmitter coordinates: 43°9′57″N 95°8′46″W
- Translator: 102.5 K273DD (Spencer)

Links
- Public license information: Public file; LMS
- Webcast: Listen Live
- Website: kicdam.com

KICD (1240 kHz) is an AM radio station in Spencer, Iowa, United States. The station broadcasts a news/talk format. KICD is owned by Saga Communications as part of its Spencer Radio Group; the license is held by Saga Communications of Iowa, LLC.

The studio, transmitter and broadcast tower are located on the north side of Spencer along U.S. Route 71. According to the Antenna Structure Registration database, the tower is 120 m (394 ft) tall. The tower is also used by its sister station KICD-FM.

Former logo

== F.M. translator ==
On June 29, 2018, KICD began simulcasting on FM translator K273DD/102.5-Spencer.

Broadcast translator for KICD
Call sign	Frequency	City of license	FID	ERP (W)	HAAT	Class	Transmitter coordinates	FCC info
K273DD	102.5 FM	Spencer, Iowa	200009	250	0 m (0 ft)	D	43°9′56.9″N 95°8′47″W	LMS
