= Ed Christian =

American businessman (1944–2022)

- Born: Edward Kieran Christian; June 26, 1944; Grosse Pointe, Michigan, U.S.
- Died: August 19, 2022 (aged 78); Michigan, U.S.
- Occupations: Businessman, radio executive
- Years active: 1958–2022
- Spouse: Judith Dellaire (m. 1966)
- Children: 2

Edward Kieran Christian (June 26, 1944 – August 19, 2022) was an American businessman and radio executive who was the founder and CEO of Saga Communications from 1986 until his death in 2022.

== Early life ==
Christian was born in Grosse Pointe, Michigan on June 26, 1944, to Dorothy and Ed Christian and was of Icelandic heritage.

== Career ==
In 1958, as a teenager, Christian ran control boards at several FM radio stations in Detroit. He later worked as a radio reporter at several Lansing radio stations, while studying at Michigan State University.

In 1966, after graduating from Wayne State University with a bachelor's degree of Arts in Mass Communications, Christian became an account executive for WCAR in Detroit. He later went through job changes and earned a master's degree in management from Central Michigan University.

In 1971, at 26 years old, Christian purchased WCER-FM in Charlotte, Michigan (now licensed to Grand Ledge).

In 1974, Christian was brought in as vice president and general manager to save WNIC (which was in deep financial trouble at the time). He would later join Marvin Josephson with his company Josephson Communications Inc. after the company purchased the station, but kept Christian to help build the company. In 1977, he became the president of the company.

In April 1986, Josephson sold all of his acquired stations (including WNIC) to Christian. Christian later named his company Saga Communications (a tentative name that later became official). Christian stated in a newspaper interview that the name "saga" came from the words "an ongoing adventure" in the Nordic language as his "heritage is Icelandic."

== Death ==
Christian died on August 19, 2022, after a "short illness", he was 78. He was survived by his wife, two children and four grandchildren.
