= WASK (AM) =

Radio station in Lafayette, Indiana

Coordinates: 40°24′08″N 86°50′59″W

- Lafayette, Indiana; United States
- Broadcast area: Lafayette metropolitan area
- Frequency: 1450 kHz
- Branding: 101.7 The Hammer

Programming
- Format: Sports
- Affiliations: ESPN Radio; Chicago Cubs Radio Network; Indianapolis Colts Radio Network

Ownership
- Owner: Saga Communications; (Saga Communications, LLC)
- Sister stations: WASK-FM; WKHY; WKOA; WXXB

History
- First air date: 1942

Technical information
- Licensing authority: FCC
- Facility ID: 71065
- Class: C
- Power: 1,000 watts
- Translator: 101.7 W269DJ (Lafayette)

Links
- Public license information: Public file; LMS
- Webcast: Listen live
- Website: 1017thehammer.com

WASK (1450 AM) is a commercial radio station in Lafayette, Indiana, United States. It broadcasts a sports radio format and is owned by Saga Communications. The studios and transmitter are at 3575 McCarty Lane in Lafayette. Most programming comes from ESPN Radio.

WASK is also heard on FM translator W269DJ at 101.7 MHz in Lafayette. It uses the FM dial position in its moniker "101.7 The Hammer."

== History ==
The station signed on the air in 1942. For many years it simulcast 98.7 WASK-FM, beginning in the mid-1990s. The simulcast began to be broken in early 2006 when the AM station aired broadcasts of the NCAA Championships and IRL Racing. Outside of these broadcasts, 1450 resumed simulcasting the FM's oldies format. However, in August 2006, the station began running independent from WASK-FM full-time when it acquired rights to run ESPN Radio in the Lafayette market.

It began running local sports in 2008 with former Purdue Boilermaker Offensive Lineman Kelly Kitchel, former WLFI-TV Personality Clayton Duffy and former Journal and Courier writer Brendan Murphy as hosts.

Schurz Communications announced on September 14, 2015, that it would exit broadcasting and sell its television and radio stations, including WASK, to Gray Television for $442.5 million. Though Gray initially intended to keep Schurz' radio stations, on November 2, it announced that Neuhoff Communications would acquire WASK and Schurz' other Lafayette radio stations for $8 million.

On March 15, 2018, WASK rebranded as "101.7 The Hammer" (now simulcasting on FM translator W269DJ 101.7 FM Lafayette).

On February 13, 2024, Neuhoff Communications sold its Lafayette radio cluster to Saga Communications for $5.3 million.

== Programming ==
WASK is the Lafayette radio market's ESPN Radio Network affiliate. 101.7 The Hammer also airs live sports broadcasts including the Chicago Cubs, Indianapolis Colts, the NCAA Tournament, Purdue football tailgate show, college football, Monday Night Football, Bowl Championship Series, high school football, Super Bowl and NFL Playoffs.

Jeff Strange is the Program Director.

== Previous logo ==
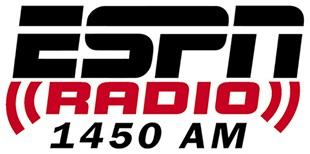
