= WASK-FM =

Radio station in Battle Ground, Indiana

Coordinates: 40.391°N 86.865°W

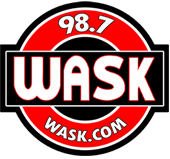
- Battle Ground, Indiana; United States
- Broadcast area: Lafayette metropolitan area
- Frequency: 98.7 MHz
- Branding: 98.7 WASK

Programming
- Format: Classic hits

Ownership
- Owner: Saga Communications; (Saga Communications, LLC)
- Sister stations: WASK; WKHY; WKOA; WXXB

History
- First air date: 1992
- Former call signs: WVZE (1991–1992); WIIZ (1992–1995)

Technical information
- Licensing authority: FCC
- Facility ID: 59361
- Class: A
- ERP: 4,400 watts
- HAAT: 117 meters (384 ft)

Links
- Public license information: Public file; LMS
- Webcast: Listen live
- Website: wask.com

WASK-FM (98.7 FM, "98.7 WASK") is a commercial radio station licensed to Battle Ground, Indiana, United States, and serving the Lafayette metropolitan area. The studios are located at 3575 McCarty Lane in Lafayette and its transmitter tower is located on South 30th Street in Lafayette.

== History ==
WASK-FM signed on the air in late 1992 as WIIZ, 98.7 The Wizard, featuring an Adult album alternative or Triple A format. The original owners, Wizard Broadcasting, called the station a clone of Chicago's WXRT, which featured similar programming. The station had a loyal following during its short existence. However, due to the station being a standalone FM and given the fact that this was immediately before the modern rock revolution of the mid- to late-1990s, the station went bankrupt and shut down.

In 1994, WASK, Inc., owners of country music outlet, WASK-FM (K105) and news/talk station WASK (1450) acquired the defunct station and returned it to the air. Initially WIIZ, went back on the air with alternative rock, but in March 1995, the station acquired 105.3's WASK-FM calls and became a news/talk simulcast of the company's AM 1450. The Newstalk WASK simulcast was a success for 98.7, featuring high-profile national personalities such as Rush Limbaugh and G. Gordon Liddy, then-rising syndicated "hot talk" personality Tom Leykis as well as local morning (Don Pratt) and afternoon drive (Ski Anderson/Jim Walsh)programs. In fact, the simulcast garnered the highest ratings in the United States for the FM "Hot Talk" format under programmer Keith Harris and consultant Doug Silver. WASK also featured high school and professional sports on the weekends with 1970s and 1980s classic hits music filling the other weekend dayparts.

Despite a successful run as a news/talk station, WASK dropped the format in September 1997 citing expense as the main reason for the switch. The format was changed to oldies and "Kool AM & FM" premiered, featuring music from the 1950s through the 1970s. Within a year, the name was changed again to "Kool Oldies WASK" and programming was streamlined to mainly late 1950s through early 1970s pop hits. In 2003, WASK-AM-FM changed their name yet again to simply "Oldies 98.7 WASK."

In 2006, after over a 10-year run simulcasting with AM 1450, the two stations officially split programming. 1450 WASK would become an ESPN Radio affiliate as "ESPN 1450" becoming Lafayette's only AM commercial station running an independent format for over 4 years. WASK-FM changed its positioning statement from mentioning Oldies to "The Super Hits Of The 60s and 70s".

WASK-FM currently positions itself as "Lafayette's Listen at Work Station" and carries Indianapolis Colts football.

Schurz Communications announced on September 14, 2015, that it would exit broadcasting and sell its television and radio stations, including WASK-FM, to Gray Television for $442.5 million. Though Gray initially intended to keep Schurz' radio stations, on November 2, it announced that Neuhoff Media would acquire WASK-FM and Schurz' other Lafayette radio stations for $8 million.

On February 13, 2024, Neuhoff Communications sold its Lafayette radio cluster to Saga Communications for $5.3 million.
