= WRSI =

Radio station in Turners Falls, Massachusetts

- Turners Falls, Massachusetts; United States
- Broadcast area: Northampton, Massachusetts
- Frequency: 93.9 MHz (HD Radio)
- Branding: 93.9 The River

Programming
- Format: Adult album alternative

Ownership
- Owner: Saga Communications; (Saga Communications of New England, LLC)
- Sister stations: WHMP

History
- First air date: July 26, 1981 (format, on 95.3 FM); July 1994 (license, as WPVQ)
- Former call signs: WPVQ (1993–2001)

Technical information
- Licensing authority: FCC
- Facility ID: 8775
- Class: A
- ERP: 4,900 watts
- HAAT: 111 meters (364 ft)
- Transmitter coordinates: 42°34′15.1″N 72°38′41.1″W
- Repeaters: 101.5 WRSY (Marlboro, Vermont); 97.7 WSNI-HD2 (Keene, New Hampshire); 99.1 W256BJ (Keene, New Hampshire)

Links
- Public license information: Public file; LMS
- Webcast: Listen live
- Website: wrsi.com

WRSI (93.9 FM, "93.9 The River") is a radio station in Turners Falls, Massachusetts, United States. The station is owned by Saga Communications and licensed to Saga Communications of New England, LLC. It airs an adult album alternative music format.

== History ==
On July 11, 1977, Ed Skutnik filed an application on behalf of his company, Green Valley Broadcasting Co., Ltd. to build a new FM station in Greenfield, Massachusetts. A competing application was filed by Poet's Seat Broadcasting, Inc. for the same vacant FM channel (95.3 MHz in Greenfield). After years of hearings and appeals, the Federal Communications Commission (FCC) ultimately awarded the permit to Green Valley Broadcasting, which began construction in January 1981.

WRSI officially went on the air July 26, 1981, with a diverse programming line up, including music from the genres of rock, classical, jazz, new age, folk, world and country. A concerted effort was made to showcase local western Massachusetts musicians.

WRSI was the first stereo FM station in Franklin County, Massachusetts, and used next to no compression of its audio signals. WRSI was also the first station in western Massachusetts beginning, in 1982, to use compact discs as part of its regular programming.

WRSI added a sister station in March 1987. WPOE (1520 AM) in Greenfield was purchased from Poet's Seat Broadcasting Inc. The call letters were changed to WGAM.

Green Valley Broadcasting Co., Ltd. (Ed Skutnik, owner) sold WRSI and WGAM to Howard Communications Corp. in October 1988 for $1.535 million. Howard Communications went into receivership in January 1992. At that time, Skutnik was asked to manage the stations until a new owner was found.

In November 1992, under the ownership of Skutnik, Radio Skutnik Inc. bought back WRSI and WGAM from the receivership. In October 1996, Radio Skutnik sold WRSI and WGAM to Watertown Radio Associates. In August 1999, Vox Media Corp. purchased Dynacom and all of its radio assets, including WRSI, for a reported $5.5 million.

In February 2001, WRSI swapped frequencies with WPVQ so that WPVQ now broadcasts on 95.3 MHz from Greenfield, and WRSI broadcasts on its current 93.9 MHz. The 93.9 FM station was assigned the WRSI call letters by the FCC on February 1, 2001.

In December 2003, Saga Communications announced that it had reached an agreement to purchase WRSI (93.9 FM) and WPVQ (95.3 FM) plus WRSY (101.5 FM) from Vox Media. The $7 million deal closed in April 2004.

== Alumni ==
Rachel Maddow, host of The Rachel Maddow Show on MSNBC and a former Air America Radio personality, worked for WRSI as host of "The Big Breakfast" after getting her start in radio at nearby WRNX.
