= KICD-FM =

Radio station in Spencer, Iowa

- Spencer, Iowa; United States
- Frequency: 107.7 MHz
- Branding: Big Country 107.7

Programming
- Format: Country
- Affiliations: Premiere Networks

Ownership
- Owner: Saga Communications; (Saga Communications of Iowa, LLC)
- Sister stations: KICD; KMRR

History
- First air date: September 17, 1965

Technical information
- Licensing authority: FCC
- Facility ID: 29079
- Class: C1
- ERP: 100,000 watts
- HAAT: 95 metres (312 ft)
- Transmitter coordinates: 43°9′57″N 95°8′47″W

Links
- Public license information: Public file; LMS
- Webcast: Listen Live
- Website: bigcountry1077.com

KICD-FM (107.7 MHz) is a radio station in Spencer, Iowa, United States. The station broadcasts a country music format and is owned by Saga Communications.

The studio, transmitter and broadcast tower are located on the north side of Spencer along U.S. Route 71. According to the Antenna Structure Registration database, the tower is 120 m (394 ft) tall with the antenna array mounted at the 102 m (335 ft) level. The calculated Height Above Average Terrain is 87 m (285 ft). The tower is also used by its sister station KICD (AM).

Previous logo
