= WPVQ-FM =

Radio station in Greenfield, Massachusetts

- Greenfield, Massachusetts; United States
- Frequency: 95.3 MHz (HD Radio)
- Branding: Bear Country 95.3

Programming
- Format: Country
- Subchannels: HD2: Soft AC "EZ 107.5"; HD3: Classic country "92.3 The Outlaw"
- Affiliations: Compass Media Networks; Westwood One; New England Patriots Radio Network

Ownership
- Owner: Saga Communications; (Saga Communications of New England, LLC)
- Sister stations: WHAI; WIZZ

History
- First air date: July 26, 1981
- Former call signs: WRSI (1981–2001); WPVQ (2001–2018)

Technical information
- Licensing authority: FCC
- Facility ID: 54780
- Class: A
- ERP: 610 watts
- HAAT: 224 meters (735 ft)
- Transmitter coordinates: 42°41′53.3″N 72°36′18.3″W
- Translators: HD2: 107.5 W298CA (Greenfield); HD3: 92.3 W222CH (Greenfield)

Links
- Public license information: Public file; LMS
- Webcast: Listen live; HD2: Listen live; HD3: Listen live
- Website: bear953.com; HD2: ez1075.com; HD3: outlaw923.com

WPVQ-FM (95.3 MHz, "Bear Country 95.3") is a radio station in Greenfield, Massachusetts, United States. The station is owned by Saga Communications and licensed to Saga Communications of New England, LLC; it operates as part of Saga's Western Mass Radio Group. WPVQ-FM airs a country music format.

== History ==
In August 1996, Dynacom purchased WRSI (95.3 FM) and WGAM from Radio Skutnik, Inc. (Ed Skutnik, owner) for a reported sale price of $650,000. In August 1999, Vox Media Corp. purchased Dynacom and all of its radio assets, including WRSI, for a reported $5.5 million.

In July 2000, Vox purchased WPVQ (93.9 FM) from Cardwell Broadcasting for a reported sale price of $2.925 million.

In February 2001, WPVQ swapped frequencies with WRSI so that WRSI now broadcasts on 93.9 MHz from Turners Falls, Massachusetts, and WPVQ broadcasts on its current 95.3 MHz. The 95.3 FM station was assigned the WPVQ call letters by the Federal Communications Commission on February 1, 2001.

In December 2003, Saga Communications announced that it had reached an agreement to purchase WRSI (93.9 FM) and WPVQ (95.3 FM) plus WRSY (101.5 FM) from Vox. The $7 million deal closed in April 2004. The station's call sign was modified to WPVQ-FM on October 5, 2018.

== HD subchannels ==
On February 1, 2021, WPVQ-FM launched a soft adult contemporary format on its HD2 subchannel, branded as "EZ 107.5"; the branding reflects its carriage on translator W298CA (107.5 FM) in Greenfield.

As of November 2022, WPVQ-FM's HD3 subchannel serves as the origination for the classic country format, branded "92.3 The Outlaw", carried on W222CH (92.3 FM) in Greenfield. The "Outlaw" programming and the 92.3 translator had been associated with WPVQ (700 AM) prior to Saga's sale of that station in 2022.

Call sign	Frequency	City of license	FID	ERP (W)	Class	Transmitter coordinates	FCC info	Notes
W298CA	107.5 FM	Greenfield, Massachusetts	25008	250	D	42°35′20.3″N 72°37′3.3″W	LMS	Relays HD2
W222CH	92.3 FM	Greenfield, Massachusetts	140079	250	D	42°34′15.1″N 72°38′41.1″W	LMS	Relays HD3
