= WAFX =

Radio station in Suffolk, Virginia

- Suffolk, Virginia; United States
- Broadcast area: Hampton Roads; Northeastern North Carolina
- Frequency: 106.9 MHz (HD Radio)
- Branding: 106.9 The Fox

Programming
- Format: Classic rock

Ownership
- Owner: Saga Communications; (Tidewater Communications, LLC.)
- Sister stations: WNOR

History
- First air date: December 12, 1983
- Former call signs: WTID (1981–1987); WSKX (1987–1989)
- Call sign meaning: FX for "The Fox"

Technical information
- Facility ID: 67082
- Class: C
- ERP: 100,000 watts
- HAAT: 300 meters (980 ft)
- Transmitter coordinates: 36°48′9.0″N 76°45′19.0″W

Links
- Webcast: Listen Live
- Website: 1069thefox.com

WAFX (106.9 FM, "106.9 The Fox") is a commercial radio station licensed to Suffolk, Virginia, United States, serving the Hampton Roads (Norfolk–Virginia Beach–Newport News) radio market. Owned by Saga Communications, The station airs a classic rock radio format.

WAFX broadcasts in the HD Radio (hybrid) format. Studios and offices are on Greenbrier Circle in Chesapeake. Most FM stations in the market are powered at 50,000 watts or less, but WAFX runs at 100,000 watts. It is a Class C FM station, with its transmitter off U.S. Route 258 in Windsor, Virginia, just far enough west to be in the Class C zone. Eastern Virginia is in the Class B zone, which limits the effective radiated power of FM stations closer to the Atlantic coast. WAFX's signal covers most of Southeastern Virginia and Northeastern North Carolina, and is audible from the suburbs of Richmond, Virginia, to Elizabeth City, North Carolina.

== History ==
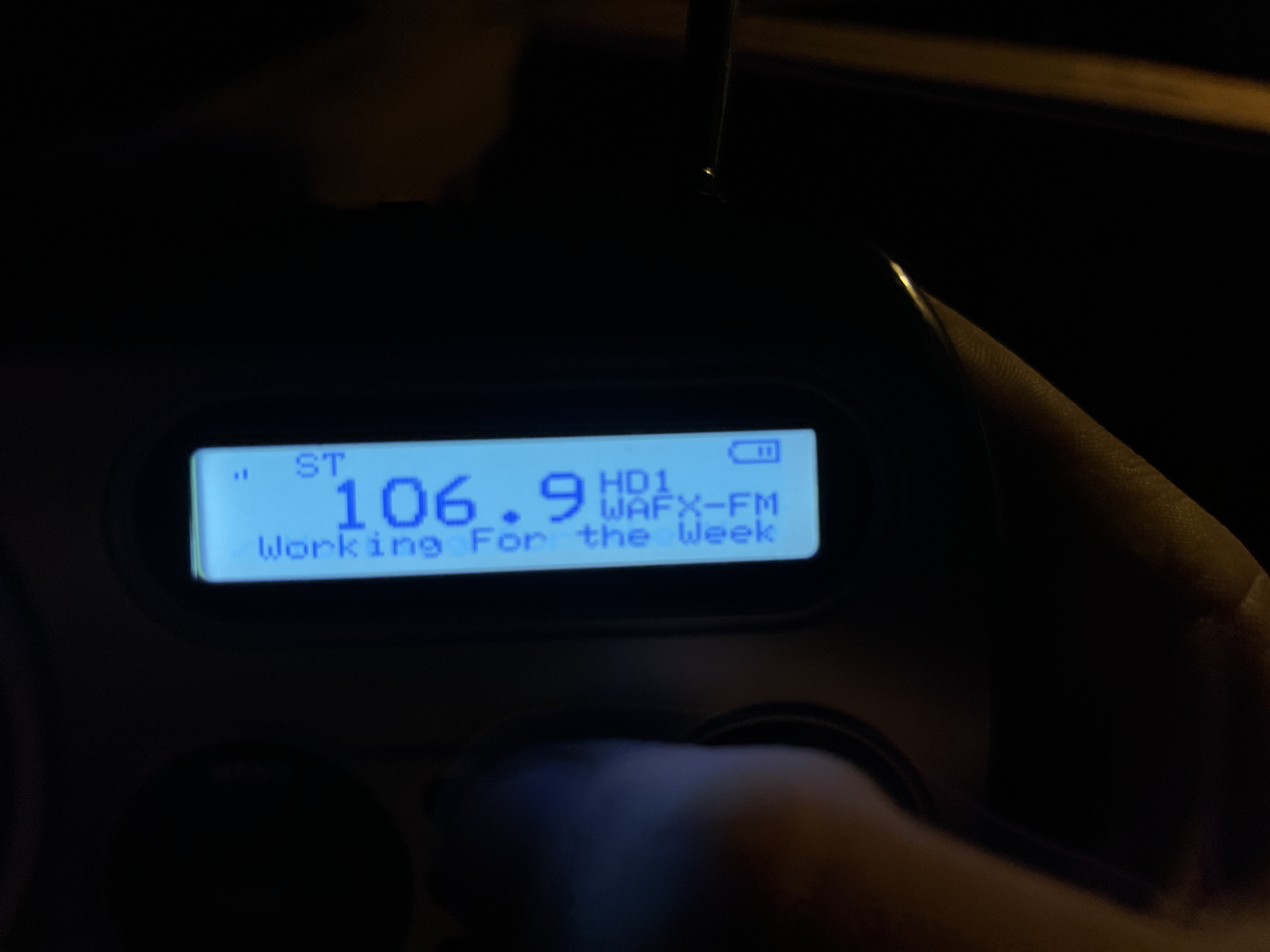
WAFX as seen on SPARC HD Radio with one HD sub-channel.

In 1981, Voice of The People, Inc., received a construction permit from the Federal Communications Commission to construct and operate a new FM broadcast station at Suffolk, Virginia, on the frequency 106.9 MHz. Voice of The People chose WTID for the call sign, which stood for the Tidewater region of Virginia. The station signed on the air in November 1982. WTID aired a Christian radio format. In April 1985, the station was sold to Southern Starr Broadcasting Group, Inc., of Altamonte Springs, Florida.

In 1987, Downs Radio, Inc., acquired WTID. Its call letters were changed to WSKX and it aired a country music format. The KX in the call sign stood for "Kicks." The station struggled against the market's long-time country leader, 100.5 WCMS-FM (now urban adult contemporary WVBW-FM). WSKX left the country format in 1989, becoming classic rock WAFX "The Fox."

Radio Ventures, Inc., acquired the station for $10 million in 1990. In 1994, Saga Communications bought WAFX for $4 million. Saga, which already owned album rock WNOR, continued WAFX's classic rock format, while moving WNOR-FM to a more current-based, harder-edged active rock format. As of today, "The Fox" has updated their playlist to expand and play popularly iconic 1990s alternative and grunge into their playlist but not all that frequently, in order to retain their classic rock format to distinguish from their sister station, WNOR. WNOR which is known as "FM99" has recently tweaked their active rock format to be more like mainstream rock in comparison, giving WAFX room to play even broader classic rock to avoid overlapping.
