= WIZZ =

Radio station in Greenfield, Massachusetts

- Greenfield, Massachusetts; United States
- Frequency: 1520 kHz
- Branding: Pure Oldies 1520 AM & 100.5 FM

Programming
- Format: Oldies

Ownership
- Owner: Saga Communications; (Saga Communications of New England, LLC)
- Sister stations: WHAI; WPVQ-FM

History
- First air date: August 26, 1980
- Former call signs: WPOE (1980–1987); WGAM (1987–2003)

Technical information
- Licensing authority: FCC
- Facility ID: 54779
- Class: D
- Power: 1,000 watts day; 160 watts night
- Transmitter coordinates: 42°35′20.31″N 72°37′3.33″W
- Translator: 100.5 W263DE (Greenfield)

Links
- Public license information: Public file; LMS
- Webcast: Listen live
- Website: pureoldiesgreenfield.com

WIZZ (1520 AM) is a radio station in Greenfield, Massachusetts, United States. It is owned by Saga Communications and operates as part of its Western Mass Radio Group. It broadcasts an oldies radio format, switching to Christmas music in the weeks leading up to Christmas.

By day, WIZZ transmits with 1,000 watts. As 1520 AM is a clear channel frequency, WIZZ reduces power at night to 160 watts to protect other stations from interference. Programming is also heard on FM translator W263DE at 100.5 MHz in Greenfield.

== History ==
The station signed on the air on August 26, 1980. The original call sign was WPOE, standing for Poet's Seat Broadcasting. It had a middle of the road (MOR) format. In its early years, the station was a daytimer, required to go off the air at night. In 1987, the call letters changed to WGAM, with a format of big band music and adult standards.

The station was assigned the WIZZ call letters by the Federal Communications Commission on February 1, 2003. WIZZ previously aired a locally programmed adult standards format. It carried the national AP Radio newscast on the hour and half-hour. The station verified signal reports by QSL card. At the top of the hour, WIZZ used the same "V for Victory" time tone as WTIC in Hartford.

WIZZ's former owner and disc jockey, Phil D (Phillip Drumheller), was inducted into the Massachusetts Broadcasters Hall of Fame in 2010, and was active in broadcasting for 60 years. He was the first inductee into the MBHOF to have had his career outside the Boston radio market.

On April 6, 2022, Saga Communications acquired WIZZ and flipped it from adult standards to oldies. Programming is simulcast on the HD3 digital subchannel of 99.3 WLZX-FM in Northampton. It is also heard on an FM translator at 100.5 MHz.

== Translator ==
Call sign	Frequency	City of license	FID	ERP (W)	Class	Transmitter coordinates	FCC info
W263DE	100.5 FM	Greenfield, Massachusetts	201279	250	D	42°35′20″N 72°37′3.7″W	LMS
