= WJZN =

Currently silent
- Augusta, Maine; United States
- Broadcast area: Kennebec County, Maine
- Frequency: 1400 kHz

Ownership
- Owner: Townsquare Media; (Townsquare License, LLC)
- Sister stations: WEBB; WMME-FM

History
- First air date: February 23, 1932
- Former call signs: WRDO (1932–1987); WMME (1987–1995); WEZW (1995–1996); WLTI (1996); WEZW (1996–2004)
- Call sign meaning: warehoused from the now-WKIM in Munford, Tennessee

Technical information
- Licensing authority: FCC
- Facility ID: 52604
- Class: C
- Power: 1,000 watts
- Transmitter coordinates: 44°17′31.5″N 69°46′23.76″W
- Translator: 95.9 W240DH (Augusta)

Links
- Public license information: Public file; LMS

WJZN (1400 AM) is a radio station licensed to serve Augusta, Maine, United States. The station, established in 1932 as WRDO, is owned by Townsquare Media; it broadcast an alternative rock format simulcast from WCYY in Portland prior to going silent in May 2023. WJZN's programming is also heard on W240DH (95.9 FM) in Augusta.

== History ==
WJZN went on the air on February 23, 1932, as WRDO, owned by the Rines family's Congress Square Hotel Company, who also owned WCSH in Portland and WFEA in Manchester, New Hampshire.

The Rines family sold WRDO to Ocean Coast Properties, owner of WPOR AM-FM in Portland, for $100,000 in 1974. H&R Corporation bought the station for $225,000 in 1977. By 1978, WRDO had a middle of the road format and was affiliated with the NBC Radio Network. H&R sold WRDO to Sterling Broadcasting Corporation for $260,000 in 1980. Sterling changed the station's format to country music in 1981; the format was simulcast with FM sister station WSCL (92.1 FM). Augusta-Waterville Broadcasters, controlled by the owners of WGHQ and WBPM in Kingston, New York, bought WRDO and WSCL for $425,000 in 1983. By this point, the stations were simulcasting an adult contemporary format; WSCL had also moved to 92.3, and that December changed its call letters to WRDO-FM.

Augusta-Waterville Broadcasters sold WRDO and WRDO-FM to Marcom for $400,000 in 1986. The call letters changed to WMME on March 1, 1987, as the station began simulcasting a contemporary hit radio format with what had become WMME-FM. Target Communications sold WMME and WMME-FM to Tri-Group for $1.4 million in 1988. Pilot Communications bought the stations for $950,000 in 1993. The call letters were changed to WEZW on August 17, 1995, though the station continued to simulcast WMME-FM; it then changed to WLTI on August 30, 1996, before returning to WEZW on September 25.

Pilot's radio stations were acquired by Citadel Broadcasting in 1999 as part of its purchase of parent company Broadcasting Partners Holdings. In January 2003, Citadel ended WEZW's simulcast of WMME-FM and switched the station to an adult standards format, simulcast with sister station WTVL (1490 AM) in Waterville under the "Kool" branding. The call letters were changed to WJZN on October 14, 2004.

Citadel merged with Cumulus Media on September 16, 2011. Townsquare Media acquired Cumulus' Augusta-Waterville stations in 2012. On July 14, 2016, WJZN split from its simulcast with WTVL and launched a classic rock format, branded as "Capital 95.9"; this followed the launch of FM translator W240DH (95.9 FM).

On October 22, 2021, WJZN dropped the classic rock format and began stunting towards a new format to launch on Monday October 25. That day, the station began simulcasting a relaunched version of the alternative rock format from Portland sister station WCYY. WCYY's expansion, which also included WPKQ in North Conway, New Hampshire, coincided with the syndication launch of Toucher and Rich from WBZ-FM in Boston, with the WCYY stations, along with Bangor sister station WEZQ, serving as the program's first affiliates. On May 8, 2023, Townsquare Media filed an STA to take the station silent; it returned to the air on April 29, 2024, but again ceased operations February 12, 2025, as part of a series of closures of under-performing Townsquare Media stations.

== Translator ==
Call sign	Frequency	City of license	FID	ERP (W)	Class	Transmitter coordinates	FCC info
W240DH	95.9 FM	Augusta, Maine	141380	250	D	44°17′30.2″N 69°46′25.2″W	LMS
