= WEBB =

Coordinates: 44.565°N 69.610°W

- Waterville, Maine; United States
- Broadcast area: Central Maine
- Frequency: 98.5 MHz
- Branding: B 98.5

Programming
- Format: Country
- Affiliations: New England Patriots Radio Network

Ownership
- Owner: Townsquare Media; (Townsquare License, LLC)
- Sister stations: WJZN; WMME-FM

History
- First air date: March 26, 1968 (as WTVL-FM at 98.3)
- Former call signs: WTVL-FM (1968–1985); WDBX (1985–1987); WTVL-FM (1987–1993)
- Former frequencies: 98.3 MHz (1968–1985)

Technical information
- Facility ID: 52608
- Class: C1
- ERP: 61,000 watts
- HAAT: 93 meters (305 ft)

Links
- Webcast: Listen live
- Website: www.b985.fm

WEBB (98.5 FM) is a country formatted radio station licensed to Waterville, Maine. It is owned by Townsquare Media. It used to be simulcast on AM 1490 WTVL. Its studios are located along with WMME-FM and WJZN in Augusta. The station's signal can also be received in parts of the Bangor market. On air personalities include Buzz and Brittany in the Morning, Buzz Bradley, Brittany Rose, Quinn Alexander, and Sam Alex.
