= WAQY =

Radio station in Springfield, Massachusetts

- Springfield, Massachusetts; United States
- Broadcast area: Springfield metropolitan area
- Frequency: 102.1 MHz (HD Radio)
- Branding: Rock 102

Programming
- Format: Classic rock
- Subchannels: HD2: Simulcast of WLZX-FM (active rock)
- Affiliations: New England Patriots Radio Network

Ownership
- Owner: Saga Communications; (Saga Communications of New England, LLC)
- Sister stations: WLZX-FM

History
- First air date: December 17, 1966
- Former call signs: WCRX (1966–1972); WAQY (1972–1991); WAQY-FM (1991–1999)
- Call sign meaning: "Wacky Radio" (former branding)

Technical information
- Licensing authority: FCC
- Facility ID: 58551
- Class: B
- ERP: 17,000 watts
- HAAT: 238 meters (781 ft)
- Transmitter coordinates: 42.083°N 72.704°W
- Translator: HD2: 98.5 W253CD (East Longmeadow)

Links
- Public license information: Public file; LMS
- Webcast: Listen live
- Website: www.rock102.com

WAQY (102.1 FM) is an American radio station in Springfield, Massachusetts, United States, broadcasting a classic rock format. The station is owned by Saga Communications.

== History ==
The station signed on December 17, 1966, as WCRX. The call letters stood for "Charles River Broadcasting extension", the station being a sister and extension of 102.5 FM WCRB-FM in Boston, Massachusetts. Both the Springfield and Boston stations programmed a classical music format overseen by Charles River Broadcasting owner Theodore Jones.

In the mid-1970s, owners Don Wilks and Mike Schwartz decided to put the first automated rock and roll station on the air. Their program director, Jim Boldebook, was given the task of programming a Shafer automation system. WAQY broadcast top 40 music with song titles every third song and no on-the-air DJ. DJs went live starting in 1976.

In August 1981, WAQY switched to a rock music format known as album-oriented rock (AOR). Now known simply by the station’s call letters, WAQY played a mix of new rock music from the 1980s mixed with older rock artists of the 1960s (The Beatles, Jimi Hendrix etc.) and 1970s (Black Sabbath, Led Zeppelin, etc.) Artists played included then current and popular Arena rock favorites Blue Öyster Cult, Journey, Foreigner and Fleetwood Mac as well as singer and songwriter artists from Tom Petty to Billy Joel. Hard rock and heavy metal acts like AC/DC, Van Halen and Rush were also core artists. In the mid-1980s, WAQY adopted its current moniker "Rock 102" playing up to five current rock songs an hour. By 1992, WAQY stopped playing current music and completed its evolution from an AOR to a classic rock format.

The station serves as the Pioneer Valley's affiliate for the New England Patriots radio network.

== Technical ==
WAQY transmits 17,000 watts from the top of Provin Mountain in Feeding Hills on the WWLP tower. WAQY transmits using a 4-bay Continental (ERI) center-fed antenna and a Nautel NV20 HD transmitter. WAQY's signal covers all of the Springfield, Massachusetts, market, and can be heard as far south as Long Island, New York. WAQY is running a high-level IBOC (HD Digital signal) at -14db versus the normal -20db.

WAQY simulcasts sister station WLZX-FM on its HD2 subchannel. The subchannel, in turn, is simulcast on FM translator W253CD (98.5) in East Longmeadow; until 2025, the translator had received WLZX-FM's programming via WLZX (1600 AM).
