= WKVT-FM =

Radio station in Brattleboro, Vermont

- Brattleboro, Vermont; United States
- Frequency: 92.7 MHz (HD Radio)
- Branding: Rewind 92.7 & 102.3

Programming
- Format: Classic hits
- Subchannels: HD2: Simulcast of WKBK (news/talk)
- Affiliations: Premiere Networks; Boston Red Sox Radio Network

Ownership
- Owner: Saga Communications; (Saga Communications of New England, LLC)
- Sister stations: WINQ-FM; WKBK; WKNE; WRSY; WSNI; WZBK

History
- First air date: 1980

Technical information
- Licensing authority: FCC
- Facility ID: 57780
- Class: A
- ERP: 1,800 watts
- HAAT: 186 meters (610 ft)
- Transmitter coordinates: 42°53′45.2″N 72°39′47.3″W
- Translator: HD2: 100.3 W262CL (Brattleboro)
- Repeater: 1220 WZBK (Keene, New Hampshire)

Links
- Public license information: Public file; LMS
- Webcast: Listen live HD2: Listen live
- Website: myrewindradio.com; HD2: mykeenenow.com

WKVT-FM (92.7 MHz, "Rewind 92.7 & 102.3") is a radio station in Brattleboro, Vermont, United States. The station is owned by Saga Communications and licensed to Saga Communications of New England, LLC; it operates as part of Saga's Monadnock Media Group. It airs a classic hits music format.

== History ==
The station has been assigned these call letters by the Federal Communications Commission since September 12, 1979.

On December 19, 2016, WKVT-FM changed its format from classic hits to classic rock, branded as "Iconic Rock 92.7".

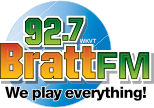
"Bratt FM" logo

On March 23, 2018, WKVT-FM changed its format from classic rock to variety hits, branded as "92.7 Bratt FM".

The station also served as the Brattleboro area's New England Patriots' affiliate for NFL games until WINQ took over.

On July 27, 2021, WKVT-FM changed its format from variety hits to classic hits, branded as "Rewind 92.7 & 102.3", adding a simulcast on WZBK (1220 AM and 102.3 FM) in Keene, New Hampshire.

On August 4, 2026, it was announced that WKVT-FM, alongside WZBK, would become an affiliate of the Boston Red Sox Radio Network; the agreement runs through the 2028 season. The affiliation became available after the market's previous Red Sox affiliate, WEEY, dropped the games in June after a sale and format change.

== Translators ==
After having relayed WKVT (1490 AM) for a while, W262CL (100.3 FM) has been relaying WKVT-FM HD2 (which is, in turn, a simulcast of WKNE-HD2 from Keene, New Hampshire) since December 2018, initially with a soft adult contemporary format branded "EZ Favorites". In August 2026, Saga replaced "EZ Favorites" with a simulcast of WKBK, its news/talk station in Keene.

Broadcast translator for WKVT-FM
| Call sign | Frequency | City of license | FID | ERP (W) | HAAT | Class | Transmitter coordinates | FCC info | Notes |
|---|---|---|---|---|---|---|---|---|---|
| W262CL | 100.3 FM | Brattleboro, Vermont | 140890 | 250 | 0 m (0 ft) | D | 42°50′47.2″N 72°41′15.3″W | LMS | Relays HD2 |
