= WRSY =

Radio station in Marlboro, Vermont

Simulcast of WRSI, Turners Falls, Massachusetts
- Marlboro, Vermont; United States
- Broadcast area: Brattleboro, Vermont
- Frequency: 101.5 MHz
- Branding: The River

Programming
- Format: Adult album alternative

Ownership
- Owner: Saga Communications; (Saga Communications of New England, LLC)
- Sister stations: WINQ-FM; WKBK; WKNE; WKVT-FM; WSNI; WZBK

History
- First air date: July 1996 (as WSSH)
- Former call signs: WAIG (1994–1996); WSSH (1996–2001)
- Call sign meaning: similar to WRSI

Technical information
- Licensing authority: FCC
- Facility ID: 17797
- Class: A
- ERP: 120 watts
- HAAT: 227 meters (745 ft)
- Transmitter coordinates: 42°50′46.2″N 72°41′14.3″W

Links
- Public license information: Public file; LMS
- Webcast: Listen live
- Website: wrsi.com

WRSY (101.5 MHz) is a commercial FM radio station licensed to Marlboro, Vermont, United States, and serving Brattleboro. The station is owned by Saga Communications, and operates as part of its Monadnock Broadcasting Group.

WRSY airs an adult album alternative radio format, via a simulcast of 93.9 WRSI in Turners Falls, Massachusetts. WRSY is heard in Southeastern Vermont and Southwestern New Hampshire.

== History ==
When it was being built, the station first took its call sign WAIG on May 20, 1994, and changed to WSSH on March 1, 1996. It officially launched in July 1996, airing a soft adult contemporary format, simulcast with 107.1 WZSH in Bellows Falls, Vermont (now WZLF).

Vox purchased the stations from Dynacom in 1999. Vox switched WSSH to the WRSI simulcast on February 1, 2001. The station was granted the WRSY call sign on April 12. Saga acquired WRSI and WRSY in 2003.
