= WZBK =

Radio station in Keene, New Hampshire

Simulcasting WKVT-FM, Brattleboro, Vermont
- Keene, New Hampshire; United States
- Broadcast area: Monadnock Region
- Frequency: 1220 kHz
- Branding: Rewind 92.7 & 102.3

Programming
- Format: Classic hits
- Affiliations: Boston Red Sox Radio Network

Ownership
- Owner: Saga Communications; (Saga Communications of New England, LLC)
- Sister stations: WINQ-FM; WKBK; WKNE; WKVT-FM; WRSY; WSNI

History
- First air date: May 1959 (as WKBK)
- Former call signs: WKBK (1959–2002)
- Call sign meaning: similar to WKBK

Technical information
- Licensing authority: FCC
- Facility ID: 57227
- Class: D
- Power: 1,000 watts day; 146 watts night
- Transmitter coordinates: 42°55′50.29″N 72°17′58.31″W
- Translator: 102.3 W272DZ (Keene)

Links
- Public license information: Public file; LMS
- Webcast: Listen live
- Website: myrewindradio.com

WZBK (1220 AM; "Rewind 92.7 & 102.3") is a radio station in Keene, New Hampshire, United States. The station is owned by Saga Communications (through its Monadnock Broadcasting Group) and licensed to Saga Communications of New England, LLC. It airs a classic hits format, simulcast with WKVT-FM 92.7 in Brattleboro, Vermont, and also heard on FM translator W272DZ (102.3) in Keene.

== History ==
The station was assigned the WZBK call letters by the Federal Communications Commission (FCC) on August 14, 2002.

In October 2008, WZBK dropped its adult standards format in favor of a simulcast of the news/talk programming of sister station WKVT from Brattleboro, Vermont. On March 31, 2011, the simulcast of WKVT was replaced by a sports radio format, largely from ESPN Radio with a local afternoon drive show and local sports. In January 2017, the station dropped ESPN Radio for Fox Sports Radio.

On July 27, 2021, WZBK dropped the sports format for a simulcast of classic hits-formatted WKVT-FM from Brattleboro, branded as "Rewind 92.7 & 102.3".

On August 4, 2026, it was announced that WKVT-FM, alongside WZBK, would become an affiliate of the Boston Red Sox Radio Network; the agreement runs through the 2028 season. The affiliation became available after the market's previous Red Sox affiliate, WEEY, dropped the games in June after a sale and format change.

== Translators ==
After a decision by the FCC, WZBK began broadcasting at 103.1 FM on FM translator W276CB on May 16, 2008. In January 2009, the FM simulcast was dropped and replaced by an oldies format branded as "Cool 103.1".

Until December 2018, WZBK was heard on FM translator W281AU (104.1 FM). This translator was converted to an oldies station, fed via the HD3 channel of WKNE, after WZBK signed on a new translator, W272DZ (102.3 FM); this translator was obtained in an FCC filing window that requires W272DZ to permanently be associated with WZBK.

Broadcast translator for WZBK
Call sign	Frequency	City of license	FID	ERP (W)	Class	Transmitter coordinates	FCC info
W272DZ	102.3 FM	Keene, New Hampshire	201372	250	D	42°54′57.3″N 72°19′51.3″W	LMS

== Former logos ==
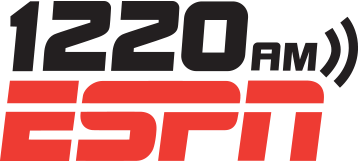
Logo used between March 31, 2011, and January 2015, before the addition of 104.1 W281AU.

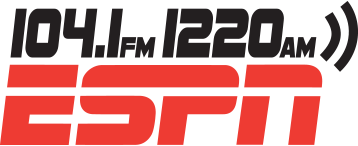

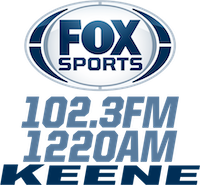
