= WINQ-FM =

Radio station in Winchester, New Hampshire

- Winchester, New Hampshire; United States
- Broadcast area: Keene, New Hampshire; Brattleboro, Vermont
- Frequency: 98.7 MHz (HD Radio)
- Branding: 98.7 WINK Country

Programming
- Format: Country
- Subchannels: HD2: Classic country "WINK Classic Country 103.1 FM"
- Affiliations: Premiere Networks; Westwood One

Ownership
- Owner: Saga Communications; (Saga Communications of New England, LLC)
- Sister stations: WKBK; WKVT-FM; WKNE; WRSY; WSNI; WZBK

History
- First air date: 1991 (as WKBK-FM)
- Former call signs: WKBK-FM (1991); WXOD (1991–2002); WOQL (2002–2005); WINQ (2005–2018)
- Call sign meaning: "Wink"

Technical information
- Licensing authority: FCC
- Facility ID: 57228
- Class: A
- ERP: 2,150 watts
- HAAT: 169 meters (554 ft)
- Transmitter coordinates: 42°54′57.3″N 72°19′51.3″W
- Translator: HD2: 103.1 W276CB (Keene)

Links
- Public license information: Public file; LMS
- Webcast: Listen live
- Website: 987wink.com; HD2: countryclassics1031.com

WINQ-FM (98.7 MHz, "WINK Country 98.7") is a radio station licensed to Winchester, New Hampshire, United States, serving Keene and Brattleboro, Vermont. The station is owned by Saga Communications licensed to Saga Communications of New England, LLC, and operates as part of its Monadnock Broadcasting Group. It airs a country music format.

The station first signed on as WKBK-FM offering the same programming as WKBK (1220 AM, now WZBK) until its sale. It then became oldies WXOD on October 1, 1991.

The station changed its call sign to WINQ on January 1, 2005. It changed its call sign to the current WINQ-FM on June 19, 2018, after it began to be simulcast on WINQ (1490 AM) in Brattleboro, Vermont. WINQ AM went off the air in 2025.

== Translators ==
W270AH, the former WZID translator in Peterborough, is now W276CB (103.1 FM) in Keene. After having relayed WKNE-HD3 for a while, W276CB has been relaying WINQ-FM's second HD Radio channel since December 2018.

Since August 2026, the classic country "WINK Country Classics" format heard on W276CB and WINQ-FM HD2 has broadcast commercial-free; concurrently, the subchannel's stream was discontinued.

Broadcast translator for WINQ-FM
Call sign	Frequency	City of license	FID	ERP (W)	HAAT	Class	Transmitter coordinates	FCC info	Notes
W276CB	103.1 FM	Keene, New Hampshire	81840	250	−92.6 m (−304 ft)	D	42°55′50.3″N 72°17′58.3″W	LMS	Relays HD2
