= WLZX-FM =

Radio station in Northampton, Massachusetts

- Northampton, Massachusetts; United States
- Broadcast area: Springfield metropolitan area
- Frequency: 99.3 MHz (HD Radio)
- Branding: Lazer 99.3 & 98.5

Programming
- Format: Active rock
- Subchannels: HD2: Classic hits "Rewind 94.3"; HD3: Oldies "Pure Oldies 96.9"

Ownership
- Owner: Saga Communications; (Saga Communications of New England, LLC)
- Sister stations: WAQY

History
- First air date: November 1, 1965 (as WHMP-FM)
- Former call signs: WHMP-FM (1965–2000); WLZX (2000–2017)
- Call sign meaning: "Lazer"

Technical information
- Licensing authority: FCC
- Facility ID: 46963
- Class: A
- ERP: 5,800 watts
- HAAT: 101 meters (331 ft)
- Transmitter coordinates: 42.374°N 72.673°W
- Translators: HD2: 94.3 W232BW (Amherst); HD3: 96.9 W245BK (Amherst)
- Repeater: 102.1 WAQY-HD2 (Springfield)

Links
- Public license information: Public file; LMS
- Webcast: Listen live; HD2: Listen live; HD3: Listen live
- Website: lazer993.com; HD2: myrewind943.com; HD3: pureoldies969.com

Former simulcast
- WLZX
- East Longmeadow, Massachusetts; United States
- Frequency: 1600 kHz

Ownership
- Owner: Saga Communications; (Saga Communications of New England, LLC)

History
- First air date: 1949 as WSFL
- Last air date: May 2025
- Former call signs: WSFL (1949–1951); WJKO (1951–1957); WTYM (1957–1977); WIXY (1977–1991); WAQY (1991–1997); WMRE (1997); WAQY (1997–1999); WPNT (1999–2000); WHNP (2000–2017)

Technical information
- Facility ID: 58546
- Class: D
- Power: 2,500 watts daytime
- Transmitter coordinates: 42°4′25.34″N 72°31′27.31″W
- Translator: 98.5 W253CD (East Longmeadow)

Links
- Public license information: Public file; LMS

WLZX-FM (99.3 MHz) is a radio station in Northampton, Massachusetts, United States. The station has an active rock format, and is owned by Saga Communications. WLZX-FM is also simulcast on the second HD Radio channel of WAQY (102.1 FM) in Springfield, as well as translator station W253CD (98.5 FM) in East Longmeadow. From 2017 to 2025, it was also simulcast on WLZX (1600 AM), also in East Longmeadow.

== History ==
What is now WLZX-FM went on the air November 1, 1965, as WHMP-FM. In 2000, Saga Communications purchased WHMP-FM and WHMP from Clear Channel, which operated WHMP-FM as the "Rock Alternative". Lazer 99.3 went live on September 11, 2000.

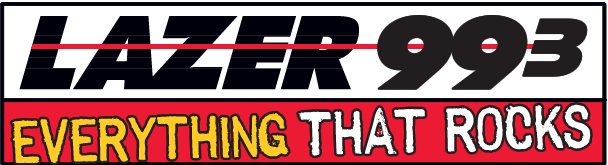
Former logo

On February 3, 2017, WLZX-FM rebranded as "Lazer 99.3 & 105.1" and began simulcasting on WLZX (1600 AM, formerly WHNP) and FM translator W286DB (105.1 FM) in East Longmeadow, Massachusetts. As WHNP, the 1600 AM facility had simulcast the talk format of sister station WHMP. The station subsequently rebranded as "Lazer 99.3 & 98.5", in reflection of the translator's move to 98.5 FM as W253CD.

The WLZX stations switched to an alternative rock format in the summer of 2017, but returned to the active rock format at 6:00 a.m. on February 4, 2020. The stations added The Toucher and Rich Show, a syndicated morning show based at WBZ-FM in Boston, on May 9, 2022; they dropped the program in 2023.

Saga Communications surrendered the WLZX AM license in May 2025. Translator W253CD now receives "Lazer" programming from the second HD Radio channel of WAQY.

== Programming ==
WLZX-FM airs an active rock format. The station also carries Boston Bruins and Boston Celtics games.

== Translators ==
In addition to W253CD (98.5), which is fed by WAQY-HD2, WLZX-FM has two translators: W232BW (94.3) in Amherst at 250 watts, which simulcasts its HD2 channel, a classic hits station branded as "Rewind 94.3"; and W245BK (96.9), also a 250-watt facility in Amherst, which simulcasts WLZX-FM's HD3 channel, an oldies station branded as "Pure Oldies 96.9".

Broadcast translator for WAQY-HD2
Call sign	Frequency	City of license	FID	ERP (W)	Class	Transmitter coordinates	FCC info
W253CD	98.5 FM	East Longmeadow, Massachusetts	156452	250	D	42°4′25.8″N 72°31′27.3″W	LMS

Broadcast translators for WLZX-FM
Call sign	Frequency	City of license	FID	ERP (W)	Class	Transmitter coordinates	FCC info	Notes
W232BW	94.3 FM	Amherst, Massachusetts	84372	250	D	42°21′49.3″N 72°25′22.3″W	LMS	Relays HD2
W245BK	96.9 FM	Amherst, Massachusetts	84114	250	D	42°22′25.3″N 72°40′24.3″W	LMS	Relays HD3
