= WKBK =

Radio station in Keene, New Hampshire

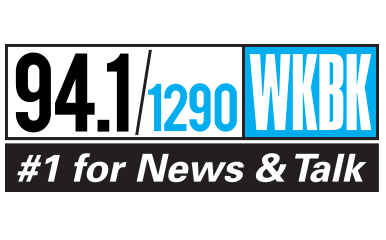
- Keene, New Hampshire; United States
- Broadcast area: Monadnock Region
- Frequency: 1290 kHz
- Branding: 94.1 & 1290 WKBK

Programming
- Format: News/talk
- Affiliations: ABC News Radio; NBC News Radio; Compass Media Networks; Salem Radio Network; Westwood One

Ownership
- Owner: Saga Communications; (Saga Communications of New England, LLC)
- Sister stations: WINQ-FM; WKNE; WKVT-FM; WRSY; WSNI; WZBK

History
- First air date: June 2, 1927 (as WNBX)
- Former call signs: WNBX (1927–1940); WKNE (1940–2002)

Technical information
- Licensing authority: FCC
- Facility ID: 36833
- Class: B
- Power: 5,000 watts
- Transmitter coordinates: 42°56′46.29″N 72°18′31.31″W
- Translators: 94.1 W231DV (Keene); WKNE-HD2: 107.5 W298BT (Keene); WKVT-FM HD2: 100.3 W262CL (Brattleboro, Vermont)
- Repeaters: 103.7 WKNE-HD2 (Keene); 92.7 WKVT-FM HD2 (Brattleboro)

Links
- Public license information: Public file; LMS
- Webcast: Listen live
- Website: mykeenenow.com

WKBK (1290 AM) is a radio station broadcasting a news/talk format in Keene, New Hampshire, United States. Owned by Saga Communications and licensed to Saga Communications of New England, LLC; it operates as part of Saga's Monadnock Broadcasting Group. WKBK features programming from ABC News Radio, NBC News Radio, Compass Media Networks, Salem Radio Network, and Westwood One. Its programming is also heard on translator stations W231DV (94.1 FM) and W298BT (107.5 FM) in Keene, and W262CL (100.3 FM) in Brattleboro, Vermont, along with the second HD Radio channels of WKNE in Keene and WKVT-FM in Brattleboro.

== History ==
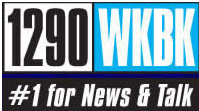
Logo before the addition of an FM translator.

WKBK originally signed on as WNBX on June 2, 1927, in Springfield, Vermont. The station operated at 1240 kHz. In November 1928, the frequency was changed to 1260 kHz. On December 25, 1940, WNBX signed on from its new location as WKNE. The move to Keene also brought an increase in power to 5,000 watts. In 1941 as part of the NARBA shift, WKNE shifted to its permanent home on 1290 AM. In early 2002, WKNE was sold to Saga Communications, along with sister station WKNE-FM. In 2002, Saga Communications also purchased WKBK (1220 AM), the other AM signal in the Keene radio market, which began the steps for a change in for the impending format flips. In late 2002, Saga Communications moved the talk programming from weaker signaled WKBK to 1290, changing the call sign to WKBK. The 1220 facility would pick up the call sign WZBK with the adult standards format (which was later dropped for a simulcast of WKVT in Brattleboro, Vermont).

On May 22, 2026, WKBK dropped CBS News Radio for ABC News Radio due to CBS News Radio being shut down that same day.

== Translator ==
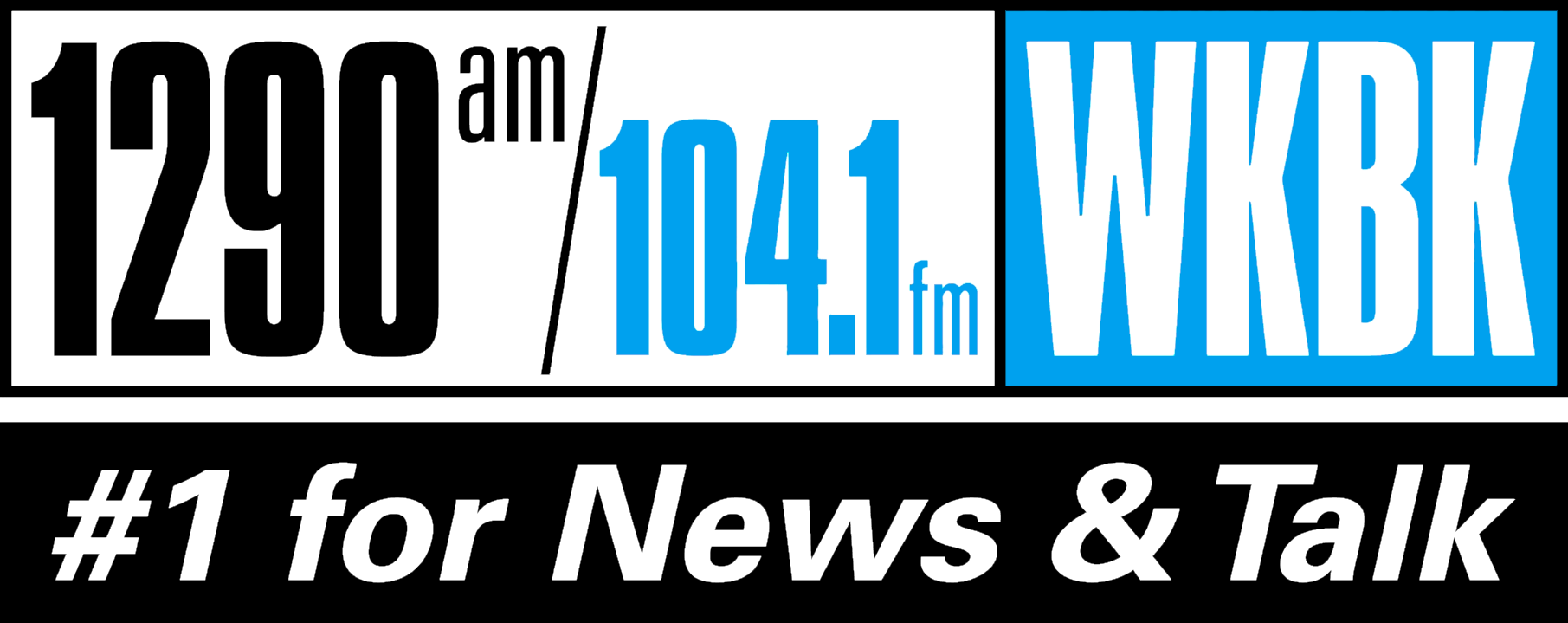
Logo during simulcast on 104.1 W281AU.

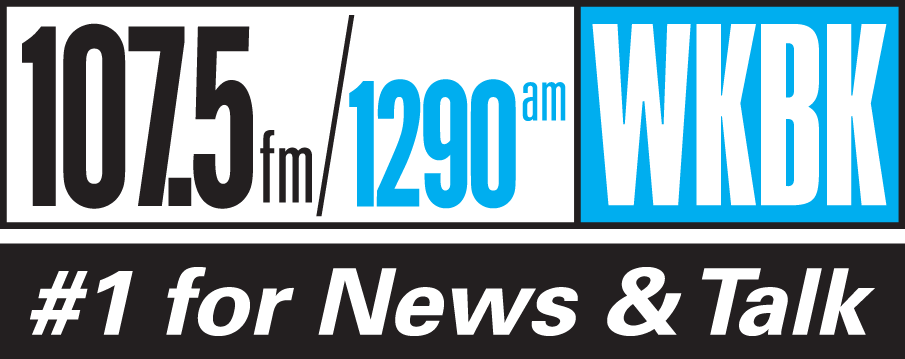
Logo during simulcast on 107.5 W298BT.

WKBK began broadcasting on its FM translator, W281AU, on May 16, 2008, after a decision by the Federal Communications Commission (FCC). In January 2009, the FM simulcast was dropped and 104.1 became "Keene Classics 104.1", playing a classic rock format. WKBK was returned to the 104.1 FM frequency in May 2009. W281AU transmits 59 watts from the tower of sister station WZBK.

Until December 2018, WKBK was heard on FM translator W298BT (107.5 FM). This translator was converted to a soft adult contemporary station, fed via the HD2 channel of WKNE, after WKBK signed on a new translator, W231DV (94.1 FM); this translator was obtained in an FCC filing window that requires W231DV to permanently be associated with WKBK.

WKBK returned to 107.5 on August 14, 2026, when Saga eliminated the soft adult contemporary format; it also replaced "EZ Favorites" on WKNE-HD2 in Keene and on W262CL (100.3 FM) and the HD2 channel of WKVT-FM in Brattleboro. The move followed the launch of an all-news format on rival WTSA, which is relayed on FM translators in both cities.

Broadcast translators for WKBK
Call sign	Frequency	City of license	FID	ERP (W)	HAAT	Class	Transmitter coordinates	FCC info	Notes
W231DV	94.1 FM	Keene, New Hampshire	201996	250	0 m (0 ft)	D	42°55′50.3″N 72°17′58.3″W	LMS	–
W298BT	107.5 FM	Keene, New Hampshire	140893	250	−92.6 m (−304 ft)	D	42°55′50.3″N 72°17′58.3″W	LMS	Relays WKNE-HD2
W262CL	100.3 FM	Brattleboro, Vermont	140890	250	0 m (0 ft)	D	42°50′47.2″N 72°41′15.3″W	LMS	Relays WKVT-FM HD2
