= WKNE =

Radio station in Keene, New Hampshire

- Keene, New Hampshire; United States
- Broadcast area: Keene-Brattleboro area
- Frequency: 103.7 MHz (HD Radio)
- Branding: 103.7 KNE-FM

Programming
- Format: Hot adult contemporary
- Subchannels: HD2: Simulcast of WKBK (news/talk); HD3: Oldies "Pure Oldies 104.1"
- Affiliations: United Stations Radio Networks; Premiere Networks

Ownership
- Owner: Saga Communications; (Saga Communications of New England, LLC)
- Sister stations: WINQ-FM; WKBK; WKVT-FM; WRSY; WSNI; WZBK

History
- First air date: May 1964
- Former call signs: WKNE-FM (1964–1974); WNBX-FM (1974–1985); WKNE-FM (1985–2003)
- Call sign meaning: "Keene"

Technical information
- Licensing authority: FCC
- Facility ID: 36834
- Class: B
- ERP: 12,000 watts
- HAAT: 302 meters (991 ft)
- Transmitter coordinates: 43°2′0″N 72°22′2″W
- Translator: See § Translators

Links
- Public license information: Public file; LMS
- Webcast: Listen live; HD3: Listen live
- Website: wkne.com; HD3: pureoldies1041.com

WKNE (103.7 FM, "103.7 KNE-FM") is a radio station in Keene, New Hampshire, United States. The station is owned by Saga Communications (which operates it as part of its Monadnock Broadcasting Group) and licensed to Saga Communications of New England, LLC. It airs a hot adult contemporary music format. WKNE transmits in HD Radio.

The station has been assigned the WKNE call sign by the Federal Communications Commission since January 21, 2003. Prior to that it held the WKNE-FM call sign since May 1985 (and prior to 1974), and WNBX-FM from 1974 to 1985.

== Translators ==
WKNE used to be heard on translators W227AW in Peterborough and W255BQ in Claremont. Saga moved the translators into Keene proper and repurposed them to relay the HD2 and HD3 streams of WKNE within the city.

- W255BQ is now W298BT 107.5 Keene, which, after having relayed WKBK for a while, has been relaying WKNE-HD2, since December 2018.
- W227AW is now W281AU 104.1 Keene, which, after having relayed WZBK for a while, has been relaying WKNE-HD3, since December 2018.

In December 2018, WKNE's HD2 subchannel relaunched as soft adult contemporary, branded as "EZ Favorites 100.3/107.5" and simulcast over WKVT-FM's HD2 channel and 100.3 W262CL (meanwhile, the WRSI simulcast moved to WSNI's HD2 subchannel) and the classic country "WINK Classic Country 103.1 FM" service that had been airing over WKNE's HD3 subchannel was moved to WINQ-FM's HD2 subchannel so that a new oldies format, branded as "Pure Oldies 104.1", could debut on WKNE's HD3 subchannel. Saga eliminated the "EZ Favorties" format on August 14, 2026, replacing it with a simulcast of WKBK.

Broadcast translators for WKNE
Call sign	Frequency	City of license	FID	ERP (W)	HAAT	Class	Transmitter coordinates	FCC info	Notes
W298BT	107.5 FM	Keene, New Hampshire	140893	250	−92.6 m (−304 ft)	D	42°55′50.3″N 72°17′58.3″W	LMS	Relays HD2
W281AU	104.1 FM	Keene, New Hampshire	140906	250	0 m (0 ft)	D	43°1′8.2″N 72°21′27.3″W	LMS	Relays HD3
