= WSNI =

Radio station in Keene, New Hampshire

- Keene, New Hampshire; United States
- Broadcast area: Monadnock Region
- Frequency: 97.7 MHz (HD Radio)
- Branding: Sunny 97.7

Programming
- Format: Adult contemporary
- Subchannels: HD2: "99.1 The River" (AAA; simulcast of WRSI)
- Affiliations: Compass Media Networks; Premiere Networks

Ownership
- Owner: Saga Communications; (Saga Communications of New England, LLC)
- Sister stations: WINQ-FM; WKBK; WKNE; WKVT-FM; WRSY; WZBK

History
- First air date: February 1983
- Former call signs: WEAD (1980); WXYW (1980–1982); WINQ-FM (1982–1991); WINQ (1991–2005); WOQL (2005–2006)
- Call sign meaning: "Sunny"

Technical information
- Licensing authority: FCC
- Facility ID: 9795
- Class: A
- ERP: 2,150 watts
- HAAT: 169 meters (554 ft)
- Transmitter coordinates: 42°54′57.3″N 72°19′51.3″W
- Translator: HD2: 99.1 W256BJ (Keene)

Links
- Public license information: Public file; LMS
- Webcast: Listen live
- Website: sunnykeene.com; HD2: wrsi.com

WSNI (97.7 FM, "Sunny 97.7") is a radio station in Keene, New Hampshire, United States. The station is owned by Saga Communications, and the broadcast license is held by Saga Communications of New England, LLC; it operates as part of Saga's Monadnock Broadcasting Group. WSNI airs an adult contemporary music format, switching to all Christmas music for the holiday season.

== History ==
The station's original construction permit was granted on February 1, 1980, with the call letters WEAD assigned on July 28, 1980; this was changed to WXYW on October 28, and to WINQ-FM on December 29, 1982. It took to the air in February 1983, though a license to cover was not issued until May 25, 1984. (The "-FM" suffix was dropped on May 13, 1991.)

WINQ was originally licensed to Winchendon, Massachusetts, and primarily targeted its programming to northern Worcester County. Initially, WINQ offered an easy listening format, airing primarily vocals, as well as several instrumentals an hour. In 1987, the station segued to an adult contemporary format; this gave way to an oldies format two years later. In 1993, WINQ again changed its format, this time to hot adult contemporary.

Saga purchased the station in 2003 and began to reorient WINQ to the Keene area. After a brief stint simulcasting WKBK's news/talk format, the station became a country station that August.

In early 2005, Saga swapped formats with its sister station on 98.7 FM, becoming WOQL, an oldies station. Around this time, WOQL relocated from its original transmitter near Winchendon to Fitzwilliam, New Hampshire, improving its signal in Keene.

The station changed its call letters to WSNI on October 16, 2006, prefacing its change to the current adult contemporary format at the end of 2006. WSNI then continued its relocation into Keene; it changed its city of license to Swanzey and relocated its transmitter to Keene in November 2007, and again changed its city of license, this time to Keene itself, in late 2008.

== Translators ==
W255BQ, the former WKNE translator in Claremont, is now W256BJ 99.1 in Keene, which, after having relayed WKNE-HD2 for a while, has been relaying WSNI-HD2 (which is itself a relay of WRSI in Turners Falls, Massachusetts) since December 2018.

Broadcast translator for WSNI-HD2
Call sign	Frequency	City of license	FID	ERP (W)	HAAT	Class	Transmitter coordinates	FCC info	Notes
W256BJ	99.1 FM	Keene, New Hampshire	140905	250	−92.5 m (−303 ft)	D	42°55′50.3″N 72°17′58.3″W	LMS	Relays HD2
