= WMTW =

WMTW may refer to:

- WMTW (TV) (virtual and digital channel 8), a television station licensed to Poland Spring, Maine
- WMNE (FM), a former FM radio station, which held the call sign WMTW from 1943 to 1946
- WBAE (AM) (1490 AM), a Portland, Maine radio station which held the call sign WMTW from 1946 to 1951
- WHOM (94.9 FM), a Mount Washington, New Hampshire FM radio station which held the call sign WMTW-FM from 1958 to 1971
- WLVP (870 AM), a Gorham, Maine AM radio station which held the call sign WMTW from 2001 to 2004
- WXTP (106.7 FM), a North Windham, Maine FM radio station which held the call sign WMTW-FM from 2001 to 2004
