= WZAN =

Radio station in Portland, Maine, United States

- Portland, Maine; United States
- Broadcast area: Portland metropolitan area
- Frequency: 970 kHz
- Branding: 101.5 & 970 The Outlaw

Programming
- Format: Classic country

Ownership
- Owner: Saga Communications; (Saga Communications of New England, LLC)
- Sister stations: WBAE; WCLZ; WGAN; WMGX; WPOR; WVAE; WYNZ

History
- First air date: July 13, 1925 (as WCSH)
- Last air date: July 15, 2026
- Former call signs: WCSH (1925–1981); WYNZ (1981–1993)
- Call sign meaning: similar to WGAN

Technical information
- Licensing authority: FCC
- Facility ID: 58538
- Class: B
- Power: 5,000 watts
- Transmitter coordinates: 43°36′19.3″N 70°19′16.18″W
- Translator: 101.5 W268CS (Portland)

Links
- Public license information: Public file; LMS
- Website: theoutlawportland.com

WZAN (970 kHz) was a commercial AM radio station broadcasting a classic country radio format. Licensed to Portland, Maine, United States, it was owned by Saga Communications. The studios and offices were on Western Avenue in South Portland, Maine.

WZAN operated with 5,000 watts. By day, the station used a non-directional antenna but at night the signal was directional to protect other radio stations on AM 970. The transmitter was located off Ellwood Avenue in Scarborough, Maine. WZAN's programming was broadcast on FM translator W268CS at 101.5 MHz in Portland.

== History ==
The station was originally WCSH, "The Voice from Sunrise Land". It was based at the Congress Square Hotel, taking its initials for its call sign. It was the first station in Portland, and one of the earliest in Maine, signing on the air on July 13, 1925. WCSH was a charter affiliate of the NBC Red Network. It carried NBC's schedule of dramas, comedies, news, sports, soap operas, game shows and big band broadcasts during the "Golden Age of Radio".

In the 1930s, WCSH broadcast on 940 kHz, at 2,500 watts by day and 1,000 watts at night. With the enactment of North American Regional Broadcasting Agreement (NARBA) in 1941, WCSH shifted to 970 kHz. The power was boosted to 5,000 watts around the clock.

In 1953, WCSH gained a sister station when WCSH-TV (channel 6) debuted. Because WCSH radio was an NBC affiliate, WCSH-TV also carried NBC-TV shows. As network programming shifted from radio to television, WCSH switched to a full service, middle of the road format of popular music, news and sports.

From 1975 to 1977, WCSH was a full time affiliate of NBC Radio's News And Information Service. WCSH continued as an all-news radio station on its own for several years after NIS was discontinued. In the 1980s, WCSH began simulcasting co-owned WYNZ-FM 100.9 using the call letters WYNZ.

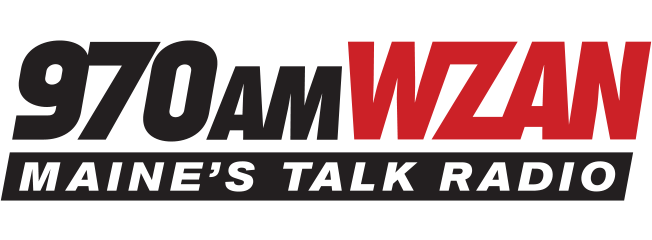
Logo as "Maine's Talk Radio"

In 1993, WYNZ-AM-FM were bought by Saga Communications for $350,000. AM 970 flipped to a hot talk format. It changed its call sign to WZAN, taking calls similar to its former long-time competitor, WGAN. The new format included syndicated wake up host Imus in the Morning until Don Imus' controversial statements about the Rutgers University women's basketball team in 2007 and the program's drop from Westwood One. Also carried were Don & Mike, The Bob & Tom Show, Lex and Terry, NASCAR racing from Motor Racing Network and NFL football from Westwood One.

In March 2009, the station ended its hot talk format. It changed programming to a more traditional conservative talk schedule, returning Imus in The Morning (by then syndicated by Citadel Media) to the schedule, along with The Sean Hannity Show and Laura Ingraham.

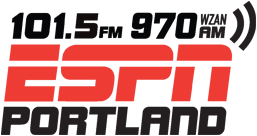
Logo as an ESPN Radio affiliate

Starting January 1, 2016, WZAN's talk programming was shifted to co-owned WBAE. WZAN became a sports radio station, using the programming of ESPN Radio. A couple of years later, an FM translator was added at 101.5 MHz so listeners in Portland and its adjacent suburbs could hear WZAN on either AM or FM radio.

On November 1, 2019, WZAN changed its format from ESPN sports to classic country, branded as "101.5 The Outlaw".

The Federal Communications Commission cancelled the station's license on July 16, 2026. Ahead of the closure, Saga filed to change the primary station of translator W268CS to the third HD Radio channel of WYNZ.

== Translator ==
Call sign	Frequency	City of license	FID	ERP (W)	Class	Transmitter coordinates	FCC info
W268CS	101.5 FM	Portland, Maine	148099	99	D	43°41′26.3″N 70°19′3.2″W	LMS
