= WPMT (Maine) =

Television station in Portland, Maine (1953–1954)

- Portland, Maine; United States
- Channels: Analog: 53 (UHF)

Programming
- Affiliations: DuMont Television Network; NBC (1953); CBS (1953–1954); ABC (1953–1954)

Ownership
- Owner: Portland Telecasting Corporation

History
- First air date: August 30, 1953
- Last air date: December 15, 1954

Technical information
- ERP: 17,400 watts
- HAAT: 260 feet (79 m)
- Transmitter coordinates: 43°39′13″N 70°15′56.5″W

Satellite station — WLAM-TV
- Lewiston–Auburn, Maine; United States
- Channels: Analog: 17 (UHF)

Ownership
- Sister stations: WLAM

History
- First air date: November 26, 1953
- Last air date: March 15, 1955

Technical information
- ERP: 15,800 watts
- HAAT: 370 feet (110 m)
- Transmitter coordinates: 44°9′13″N 70°16′36″W

WPMT (channel 53) was a television station in Portland, Maine, United States. It operated from August 30, 1953, to December 15, 1954, and was the first television station in Portland. Much of its programming was also rebroadcast on WLAM-TV (channel 17) in Lewiston–Auburn, which broadcast from November 26, 1953, to March 25, 1955; the two stations were known as the Maine Television Network. Like many early UHF television stations, the arrival of VHF stations—in this case WCSH-TV, WGAN-TV, and WMTW-TV—took away network programming and economic viability from the UHF outlets.

== History ==
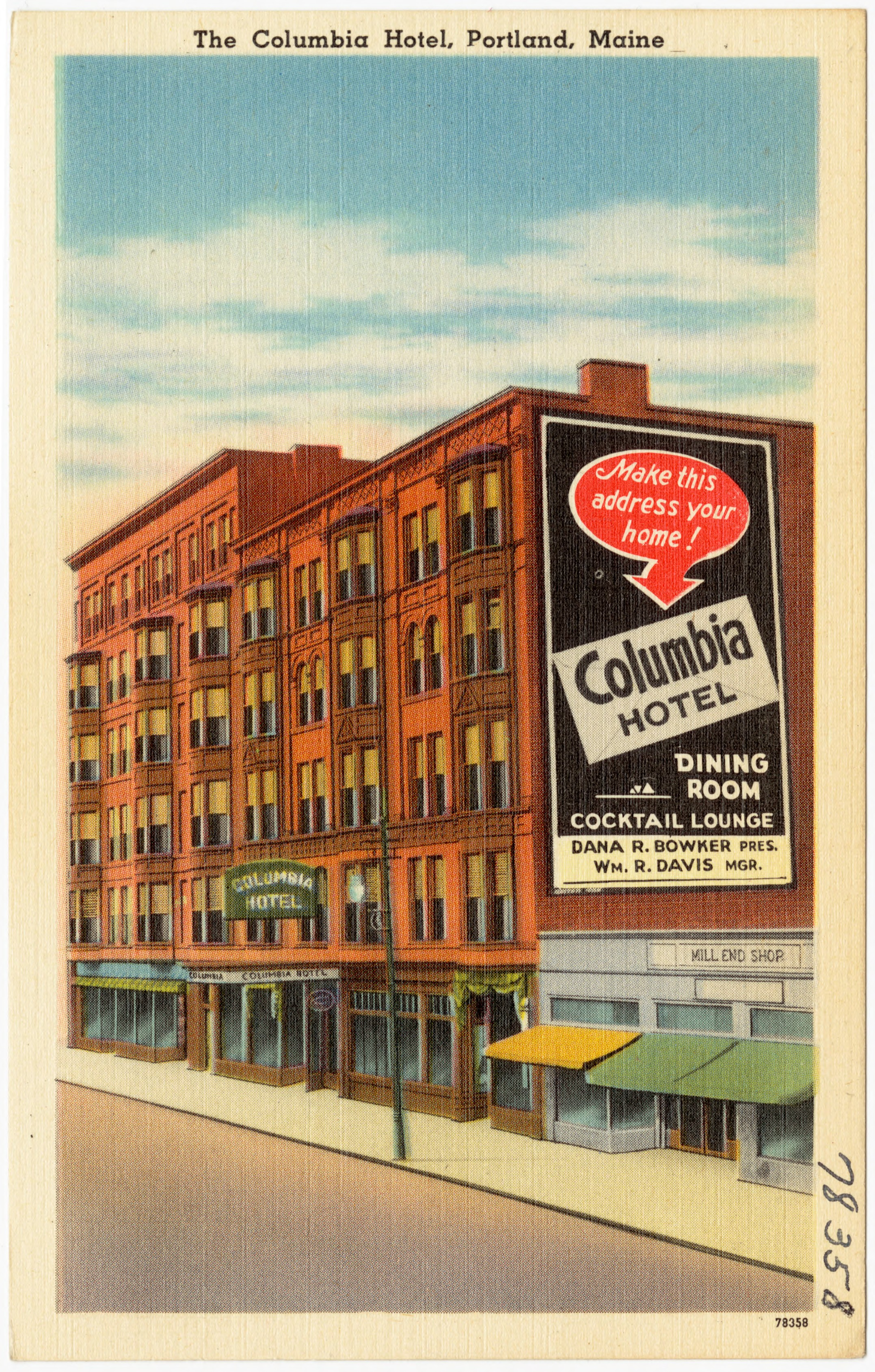
The Columbia Hotel, shown in this circa 1930s postcard, was home to WPMT.

In January 1953, the Portland Telecasting Corporation, whose principals (including president Frank S. Hoy) were the owners of Lewiston–Auburn radio station WLAM (1470 AM), applied to the Federal Communications Commission (FCC) for a construction to build a television station on Portland's allotted UHF channel, 53. (Four applicants had filed for Portland's two VHF channels.) In mid-February, the FCC approved the Portland Telecasting Corporation application and 16 others in one of its largest batches of television station grants to date.

The approval of a television station kickstarted construction, work on facilities in the former quarters of radio station WGAN in the Columbia Hotel, and the construction of microwave relay facilities to bring network television service from Boston northeast to Maine. Basic affiliation with CBS was obtained, though the station would air the programming of all major networks (CBS, NBC, ABC, and DuMont) at the outset.

By the time WPMT had been granted, WLAM (owned by the Lewiston–Auburn Broadcasting Corporation) had already filed for channel 8 in Auburn, as had station WCOU in Lewiston. However, a third proposal was heard by the commission: one to put the station on Mount Washington, the highest point in the northeastern United States, where it could serve as many as 1.5 million people. The three-way comparative hearing prompted Hoy to drop out of the VHF fight and seek channel 17 instead in order to be able to start by year's end. This inadvertently started a chain reaction. WCOU merged with the Mount Washington group, which resulted in WMTW getting a construction permit at the same time as WLAM-TV. The competing application for channel 6 that was connected to channel 8 withdrew, resulting in a construction permit grant for WCSH-TV on July 29.

WPMT made its debut on August 30 and became Maine's second television station in operation (WABI-TV in Bangor was already in service) but its first with live network programming. The opening night was headlined by a string of public dignitaries and Philo Farnsworth, who had an estate in Brownfield. With the Portland outlet on the air, work could begin in earnest in Lewiston. The Hoy family purchased a parcel of land including a house atop Applesass Hill—so named because a previous family that lived there was said to have "made and sold applesauce in large quantity"—to house WLAM-TV. The Lewiston–Auburn station bowed on Thanksgiving Day, November 26; at the outset, there was no studio equipment at Lewiston, and almost all programming—including the scheduled dedication show for WLAM-TV—had to originate in Portland. That program had to be canceled because the microwave connection from Portland to Lewiston was not complete; when it was, however, WLAM-TV became the first satellite station rebroadcasting the programming of another in the eastern United States. The first live program from Lewiston aired in February 1954.

VHF television arrived a month later to southern Maine, with WCSH-TV, an NBC affiliate, beginning on December 20. CBS affiliate WGAN-TV, also on VHF, followed on May 16; the station also became the preferred outlet for ABC in the area. Despite competition, the Maine Television Network continued to produce live remote events from Portland and Lewiston; camera crews captured a regional basketball tournament and a fashion show from Lewiston and an ordination ceremony for Catholic priests from Portland.

However, with a third regional VHF—WMTW-TV—on the air beginning in late September, there was little hope for WPMT to continue. It ceased broadcasting on December 15, 1954; in its final program, Hoy announced that the assets would be assigned to Carrell K. Pierce, employed by a Portland securities house, to be liquidated, and noted that he had attempted to find a potential educational use for the facility but met with no takers. Pierce denied rumors that The Boston Globe was interested in WPMT for use as a subscription television outlet were such transmissions to be approved by the FCC. The liquidation of Portland Telecasting concluded in early 1956; general creditors received 2.5 cents on the dollar after back taxes and administrative fees were paid, with $16,000 raised in an attempt to satisfy $200,000 in total claims.

WLAM-TV continued to broadcast for another three months with a vastly reduced program schedule and no programming on weekends after the Portland station closed down. On March 14, 1955, citing "serious financial losses", Hoy announced it would go off air later that month, which it did at the conclusion of its March 25 broadcast day.
