= James R. Flynn =

James R. Flynn may refer to:

- James Flynn (academic) (1934–2020), New Zealand intelligence researcher
- Jim Flynn (songwriter) (James Ronald Flynn, born 1938), American country music songwriter

== See also ==
- James Flynn (disambiguation)
