= WKZN =

WKZN may refer to:

- WLMZ (AM), a radio station (1300 AM) licensed to serve West Hazleton, Pennsylvania, United States, which held the call sign WKZN from 2005 to 2020
- WWL-FM, a radio station (105.3 FM) licensed to serve Kenner, Louisiana, United States, which held the call sign WKZN from 2000 to 2005
- WLAM, a radio station (1470 AM) licensed to serve Lewiston, Maine, United States, which held the call sign WKZN from 1990 to 1993
- WLVP, a radio station (870 AM) licensed to serve Gorham, Maine, which held the call sign WKZN from 1989 to 1990
- WCYK (AM), a defunct radio station (810 AM) formerly licensed to serve Crozet, Virginia, United States, which held the call sign WKZN from 1986 to 1988
- WPJX, a radio station (1500 AM) licensed to serve Zion, Illinois, United States, which held the call sign WKZN from 1977 to 1983
- WWDV, a radio station (96.9 FM) licensed to serve Zion, Illinois, which held the call signs WKZN and WKZN-FM from 1969 to 1983
