= WPFO =

Television station in Waterville, Maine

ATSC 3.0 station
- Waterville–Portland, Maine; United States
- City: Waterville, Maine
- Channels: Digital: 17 (UHF); Virtual: 23

Programming
- Affiliations: 23.1: Roar; for others, see § Technical information and subchannels

Ownership
- Owner: Sinclair Broadcast Group; (WGME Licensee, LLC)
- Sister stations: WGME-TV

History
- First air date: August 27, 1999
- Former call signs: WBDJ (1998); WMPX-TV (1998–2003)
- Former channel numbers: Analog: 23 (UHF, 1999–2009); Digital: 23 (UHF, 2009–2019)
- Former affiliations: Pax (1999–2003); Fox (2003–2025)
- Call sign meaning: Portland's Fox (former affiliation)

Technical information
- Licensing authority: FCC
- Facility ID: 84088
- ERP: 1,000 kW
- HAAT: 479 m (1,572 ft)
- Transmitter coordinates: 43°55′29″N 70°29′27″W

Links
- Public license information: Public file; LMS

WPFO (channel 23) is a television station licensed to Waterville, Maine, United States, serving the Portland area with programming from the digital multicast network Roar. It is owned by Sinclair Broadcast Group alongside CBS/Fox affiliate WGME-TV (channel 13). The two stations share studios on Northport Drive in the North Deering section of Portland; WPFO's transmitter is located on Brown Hill west of Raymond.

WPFO was built as WMPX-TV and began broadcasting in August 1999. It was Portland's Pax affiliate. In 2003, Paxson sold the station to Corporate Media Consultants Group, which converted it to a Fox affiliate that April. At the time, Portland had not had a Fox affiliate since October 2001. WGME-TV began producing a 10 p.m. newscast for WPFO in February 2007 and expanded its relationship with a morning newscast in 2010. Sinclair acquired the station's non-license assets in 2013, with Cunningham Broadcasting purchasing the license in 2017. In December 2025, WPFO's Fox subchannel moved to WGME-TV.

== History ==
=== Construction and Pax era ===
Channel 23 was allocated to Waterville, Maine, in 1987 on a petition from the Passamaquoddy Tribe. The tribe, which owned radio stations in Rockland, had expressed interest in starting a station that would cater to local advertisers in the Waterville area unserved by buying ad time on stations in Bangor or Portland. In spite of the allocation, no one applied for the channel.

This changed in 1996, when five applicants filed for channel 23. The only Maine-based group was Diversified Communications, owner of Bangor CBS affiliate WABI-TV. It proposed locating the station's studios in facilities WABI was leasing in Waterville. Because of a backlog of license applications that were mutually exclusive, stemming from a court-ordered end to the comparative hearings that once chose winning applicants in these cases, the Federal Communications Commission (FCC) allowed for financial settlements in dozens of markets. In this window, WinStar Broadcasting emerged with the channel 23 construction permit. WinStar transferred 49 percent of the permit to Paxson Communications Corporation, owner of the then-new Pax network. The tower to broadcast the new station from Oak Hill Road in Litchfield was erected in 1999.

Channel 23 began broadcasting August 27, 1999, as WMPX-TV. It provided Pax its first broadcast coverage in southern Maine; the network had only been available on cable. In August 2000, Portland NBC affiliate WCSH (channel 6) signed a joint sales agreement to provide advertising sales and limited programming to WMPX-TV. WCSH officials twice mentioned the possibility of airing a newscast on channel 23 but had not done so by 2002.

=== Fox era ===
In November 2002, Paxson Communications Corporation announced it was selling WMPX-TV to the Ohio-based Corporate Media Consultants Group for $10 million. Corporate was a joint venture of Max Media and Power Television. The deal led to speculation that WMPX-TV would become Portland's new Fox affiliate. The year before, Fox had cut ties with WPXT (channel 51), whose owner Pegasus Broadcast Television failed to come to a deal with the network. Southern Maine was thus largely dependent on Foxnet for the channel's programming, leaving Fox sports programs at the whim of equipment faults related to syndication exclusivity blackouts or locally irrelevant NFL game selections. Corporate Media confirmed WMPX-TV would become the new Portland Fox affiliate when it took over.

Channel 23 became a Fox affiliate under the new WPFO call sign on April 15, 2003. The station operated from office space on Oxford Street in Portland. Beginning in November 2005, it aired a video simulcast of radio station WLOB's morning show with local headlines displayed on the screen, branded as the Fox Morning News. This continued to air until March 30, 2009.

On February 5, 2007, Portland CBS affiliate WGME-TV began producing a nightly 10 p.m. newscast for WPFO after a news share agreement was established between the two. It aired from a secondary set at WGME's studios. The news relationship expanded in 2010 when the newscast was lengthened to an hour; a new two-hour morning newscast from 7 to 9 a.m., titled Good Day Maine, was added.

On October 31, 2013, WGME-TV owner Sinclair Broadcast Group acquired the non-license assets of WPFO from Corporate Media Consultants Group for $13.6 million. An affiliate of Sinclair, Cunningham Broadcasting Corporation, filed to acquire the license assets for $3.4 million on November 19, but the deal was not approved until June 23, 2017. In 2024, WGME began airing a new lifestyle program, ARC Maine, at 9 a.m.; the morning newscast was shortened to an hour, with the 8 a.m. hour replaced by The National Desk.

Sinclair filed to buy WPFO outright from Cunningham in August 2025, following a decision by the United States Court of Appeals for the Eighth Circuit that struck down limitations on ownership of two of the four highest-rated TV stations in a market. On December 8, 2025, the Fox affiliation was moved to WGME-TV's second subchannel, while WPFO's main channel flipped to Roar. The sale was completed on March 1, 2026.

== Technical information and subchannels ==
Since June 2024, WPFO has served as Portland's ATSC 3.0 (NextGen TV) lighthouse station. The station's ATSC 1.0 channels are carried on the multiplexed signals of other Portland television stations:

Subchannels provided by WPFO (ATSC 1.0)
Subchannel	Res.	Short name	Programming	ATSC 1.0 host
23.1	480i	ROAR	Roar	WGME-TV
23.2	480i	Charge!	Charge!	WCBB/WMEA-TV
23.3	480i	Comet	Comet	WCBB/WMEA-TV
23.4	480i	Antenna	Antenna TV	WGME-TV

WPFO's transmitter is located on Brown Hill west of Raymond and broadcasts these channels:

Subchannels of WPFO (ATSC 3.0)
Subchannel	Res.	Short name	Programming
8.1	1080p	WMTW	ABC (WMTW)
10.1	1080p	WCBB	PBS (WCBB)
13.1	1080p	WGME	CBS (WGME-TV)
13.10	1080p	T2	T2
13.11	1080p	PBTV	Pickleballtv
13.20		GMLOOP	GameLoop
13.21		ROXi	ROXi
23.1	480i	WPFO	Roar
26.1	1080p	WMEA	PBS (WMEA-TV)

Subchannel broadcast with digital rights management
Subchannel streamed via the Internet
