= Fox Portland =

Fox Portland may refer to:

- KPTV, Fox television station in Portland, Oregon
- WPFO, Fox television station in Portland, Maine
