= ABC Portland =

ABC Portland may refer to:

- KATU, the ABC television affiliate in Portland, Oregon
- WMTW (TV), the ABC television affiliate in Portland, Maine
