= James Flynn =

James, Jim, or Jimmy Flynn may refer to:

== Arts and entertainment ==
- Jimmy Flynn (1934–2022), American actor
- Jim Flynn (songwriter) (1938–2019), American country music songwriter
- James Flynn (producer) (died 2023), Irish film and television producer

== Sports ==
- Jim Flynn (footballer) (1871–1955), Australian rules footballer
- Fireman Jim Flynn (1879–1935), American bare-knuckle boxer
- Jimmy Flynn (rugby union) (1894–1965), Australian rugby union player
- James Flynn (fencer) (1907–2000), American Olympic fencer
- Jim Flynn (basketball) (died 2006), Irish Olympic basketball player
- James Flynn (rugby union) (born 1993), English rugby union player

== Others ==
- James Edward Flynn (1842–1913), American Union Army soldier and Medal of Honor recipient
- James Christopher Flynn (1852–1922), Irish politician; MP for North Cork
- James Flynn (academic) (1934–2020), New Zealand intelligence researcher
- James Flynn (politician) (born 1944), American politician, Lieutenant Governor of Wisconsin

== See also ==
- James O'Flynn (born 1995), Irish hurler
