= WWBK =

WWBK may refer to:

- WWBK-LD, a low-power television station (channel 25, virtual 28) licensed to serve Richmond, Virginia, United States
- WCME, a radio station (900 AM) licensed to serve Brunswick, Maine, United States, which held the call sign WWBK from 2008 to 2009
