= CBS Portland =

CBS Portland can refer to:

- KOIN, the CBS television affiliate in Portland, Oregon.
- WGME-TV, the CBS television affiliate in Portland, Maine.
