= Jim Flynn (songwriter) =

American country music songwriter (1938–2019)

- Flynn in June 2009.

Background information
- Born: James Ronald Flynn; March 24, 1938
- Origin: Lewiston, Maine, U.S.
- Died: May 8, 2019 (aged 81) Lewiston, Maine, U.S.
- Genres: Country music
- Occupations: Songwriter; educator

Jim Flynn (March 24, 1938 – May 8, 2019) was an American country music songwriter. He joined the United States Army and was part of "Operation Gyroscope" which was deployed to Germany as part of Cold War efforts. As a civilian, he returned to Lewiston and worked his way through business college. Later he became a high school teacher and sports coach, then sold textbooks to public schools. He began writing story songs on video sharing sites including YouTube.

Flynn died on May 8, 2019, at the age of 81.

== Early life ==
Flynn was born in Lewiston, Maine to Lawrence and Katherine (McIlroy) Flynn. He was the fourth of five sons. He grew up in Monmouth, Maine and Lewiston, where he was a member of a high school choral group.

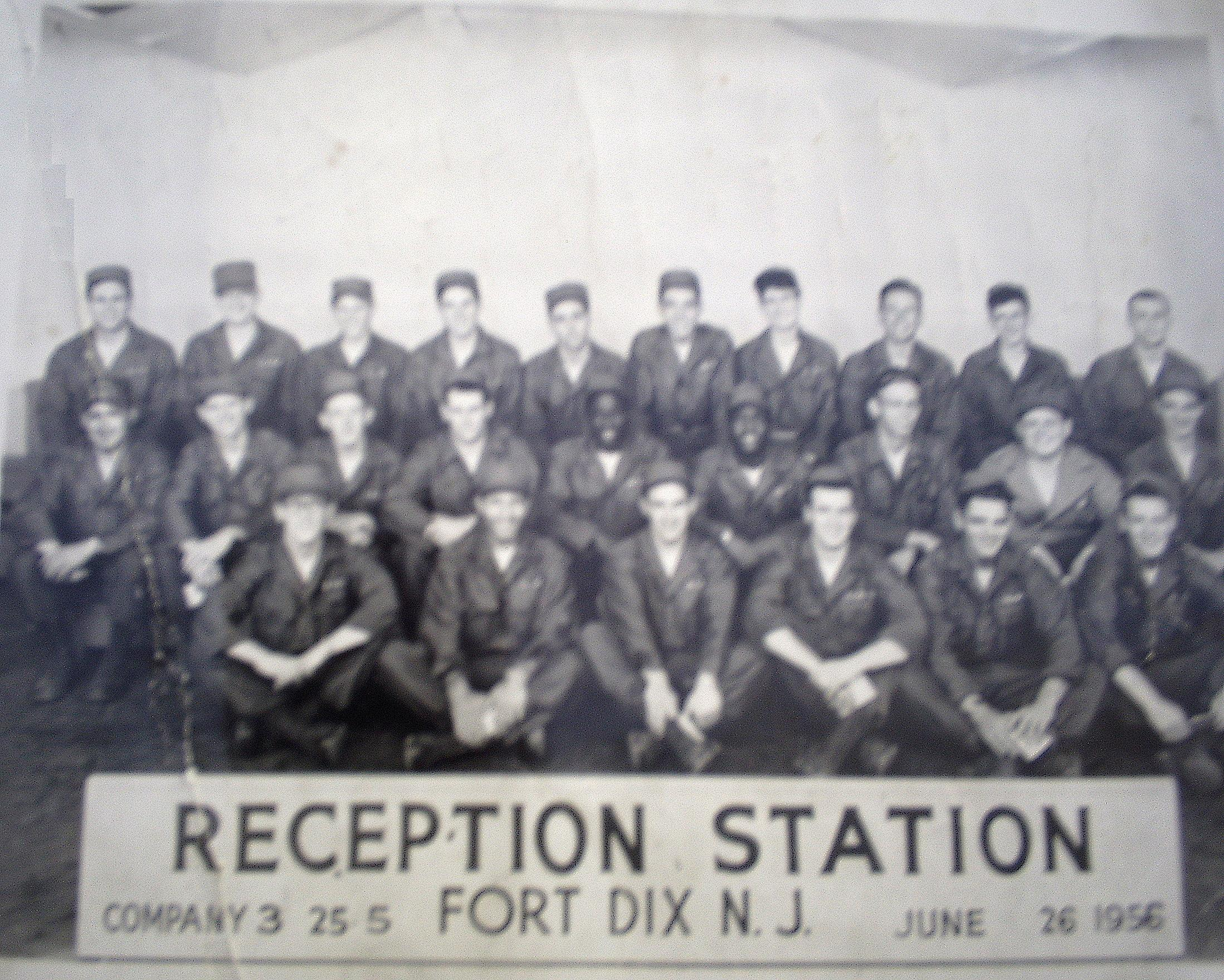
Flynn, first on left, first row, at reception station in Fort Dix, New Jersey joining the U.S. Army

In 1956, Flynn joined the United States Army. He was part of "Operation Gyroscope" and was deployed to Germany as part of the Cold War efforts of post-World War II. He served as a radio operator. In 1957, Flynn took part in a quartet known as "Tune Toppers" which enjoyed moderate success and was featured in the 10th Infantry Division Band and Chorus in Würzburg, Germany. The Band and Chorus was disbanded in early 1958 and he was honorably discharged in June 1959, three years after his enlistment.

As a civilian, Flynn returned to Lewiston and worked his way through business college, at what was then called the Auburn Maine School of Commerce. He planned to become a business education teacher. While in college, he worked as a DJ at WLAM, Lewiston-Auburn, Maine. After three years at the Auburn Maine School of Commerce, he transferred his credits to Husson College in Bangor, Maine. Flynn graduated from Husson in 1964 with a bachelor's degree in business education. With his degree, he became a high school teacher and sports coach. In 1965, a new revised GI Bill was passed, and he earned a master's degree in secondary school administration from the University of Southern Maine, Portland-Gorham campus, in 1974.

He left school teaching when he was offered a job by Southwestern Publishing selling textbooks to public schools in Maine, New Hampshire, Vermont, and Massachusetts.

== Songwriting career ==
Flynn was known in the New England country music circle for his songwriting. He wrote his first song in 1960. It was recorded by a group called "The Citations." He received his first songwriting contract from Jimmie Davis, former governor of Louisiana and a member of both the "Country Music Hall of Fame and Museum" and the "Country Music Songwriters Hall of Fame." Davis did not record Flynn's song, but his encouragement motivated Flynn to keep writing. Gene Hooper cut one of Flynn's songs in 1974. The song was called "Caroline Stood by Me;" it became a "pick hit of the week" on Maine's biggest country music station, WPOR. Since then, there have been many cuts of Flynn's songs by various artists, mainly in the country genre. His writing skill has been recognized by many local and national news organizations. His song, "Time I Change My Name to Hank", stayed on the European Country Music Charts for sixteen weeks in 2005. He was affiliated with BMI and registered many of his songs with them.

=== Philosophy ===
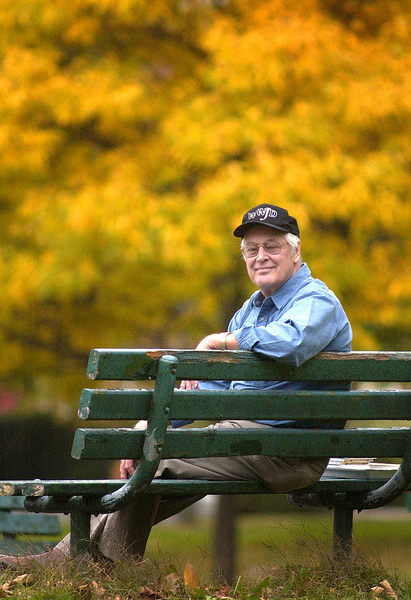
Flynn in Lewiston, Maine.

Flynn's philosophy was that he was a "small frog in a small pond;" he found enjoyment in knowing people were enjoying his music. On video sharing sites such as YouTube, his songs have found moderate success and had been played over 500,000 times, as of December 2011. His songs are played regularly by various artists on independent country stations.

Flynn enjoyed writing story songs, and songs engaging the listener and having them experience a connection. The song he believed to be his best is "MegaFlight," which discuses how it would be if it where possible to visit lost relatives and friends in heaven. The song tells the story of a man who was married to a woman that died in childbirth. In the song, the unnamed man goes to an airport to inquire about purchasing an airplane ticket to heaven for him and his young child. He wrote songs in other styles, such as "The Ballad of L.L. Bean".

=== Awards and achievements ===
Flynn was noted for his song writing ability. In the 2005 Down East Country Music (DECMA) awards, he won first place in the "Best Folk Songwriter" category for the song "The Ballad of L.L. Bean;" he took second place in two other songwriting categories. In 2006 he wrote a song titled, "The Opening Act," which later became the title track to Brian Wardwell's first album; Wardwell was a child performer. At the DECMA "Legends Show", Flynn was awarded a Founders Award for his efforts on behalf of the Maine country music community.
