= NBC Portland =

NBC Portland can refer to:

- KGW, the NBC television affiliate in Portland, Oregon.
- WCSH, the NBC television affiliate in Portland, Maine.
