= WJIB =

Radio station in Cambridge, Massachusetts, United States

- Cambridge, Massachusetts; United States
- Broadcast area: Greater Boston
- Frequency: 720 kHz
- RDS: Nostalgia
- Branding: WJIB, The Memories Channel

Programming
- Format: Soft oldies; adult standards

Ownership
- Owner: John Garabedian; (RCRQ, Inc.)

History
- First air date: April 1948
- Former call signs: WTAO (1948–1965); WXHR (1965–1967); WCAS (1967–1983); WLVG (1983–1991); WWEA (1991–1992)
- Former frequencies: 740 kHz (1948–2025)
- Call sign meaning: A reference to the type of sail known as a jib; the original WJIB at 96.9 FM was located in an office building on Boston's waterfront; original (1992) format was modeled on that station

Technical information
- Licensing authority: FCC
- Facility ID: 6146
- Class: B
- Power: 5,000 watts (day); 189 watts (night)
- Transmitter coordinates: 42°24′24.40″N 71°5′12.20″W
- Translator: 101.3 W267CE (Cambridge)

Links
- Public license information: Public file; LMS
- Webcast: Listen live
- Website: www.wjib.com

WJIB (720 AM) is a radio station in Cambridge, Massachusetts, serving Greater Boston. Licensed to RCRQ, Inc.—a company owned by veteran broadcaster John Garabedian —the station plays a mix of soft oldies and adult standards from the 1950s through the 1990s. Although licensed as a commercial radio station, WJIB is commercial-free, with its operations funded by listener donations and occasional pledge drives.

By day, WJIB transmits with 5,000 watts non-directional. Because 720 kHz is a clear channel frequency reserved for WGN in Chicago, WJIB must reduce power at night to 189 watts, using a directional antenna, to avoid interference. The station's broadcast towers are off Commercial Street in Medford. Programming is also heard on FM translator W267CE on 101.3 MHz.

== History ==
=== Early years ===
WJIB is an indirect successor to a previous Boston FM station at 96.9 MHz with the same call sign (now WBQT, owned by Beasley Broadcast Group) which in turn descended from WXHR, one of the first FM stations in the Boston area. Coincidentally, what is now WJIB was once owned by Harvey Radio Laboratories, the same company that owned WXHR/WJIB-FM. The AM station was first known as WTAO, then WXHR, and later as WCAS.

In 1967, a year after it was sold to a joint venture of Kaiser Broadcasting and The Boston Globe, WXHR became WCAS while WXHR-FM changed to WJIB, featured a beautiful music format, and became well known for a nautical-themed station identification featuring a buoy bell and a seagull (now used in modified form by WOCN-FM on Cape Cod). WJIB-FM became WCDJ, a smooth jazz station, in 1990, and the call sign WJIB lapsed.

=== WCAS ===
After Kaiser/Globe took over, WCAS at first broadcast a format with music and local news of interest to listeners in Cambridge and nearby communities, but was not very successful. The call letters referred to "Watertown, Cambridge, Arlington and Somerville and Belmont" (where the B was said to be "silent"). By 1969, WCAS had flipped to oldies. This was followed in 1972 by a soft rock format that, by 1973, had evolved into a folk/rock format which, while not enormously successful, gained a devoted following in the Boston area. It became a local favorite during the 1970s for its eclectic mix of music (L.A. folk-rock, jazz, bluegrass, country and western were only part of the playlist) and its support of local issues and musicians, notably through special live concerts and the Live at Passim's series of broadcasts. In 1976, the Harvard Crimson wrote: "The least pretentious station around is WCAS at 740 AM, which mixes country, soft rock, and folk nicely, and goes easy on the ads."

One of the station's limitations added to its character: because a limited broadcast license obliged it to go off the air at sunset, one freelancer developed a series of humorous station sign-offs which became mini-hits in themselves.

The "Live at Passim's" broadcast was done on Sundays from Club Passim (formerly Club 47). It paired local acts with national headliners at Passim's coffeehouse such as Ry Cooder, Tom Waits and Jimmy Buffett (the latter two then relatively obscure). The idea of promoting local music by broadcasting from what was then the top folk club in the area was originated by then-program director Rick Starr, who hired local performer Jim Chevallier to produce and host the program. Typically, national acts headlining at the club were the main act, preceded by local Boston-Cambridge musicians. The show's format generally imposed an all acoustic approach like that later used by MTV Unplugged. One of the first acts to appear on the show was Jimmy Buffett, then performing with only a bass player. Ry Cooder and Tom Waits appeared soon after that. The Irish traditional group The Boys of the Lough not only appeared on the show but, in 1975, released an album titled Live at Passim's. One duo who appeared at the club and on the show was Buckingham Nicks—that is, Lindsey Buckingham and Stevie Nicks, who soon joined Fleetwood Mac.

In addition to live broadcasts, the station sometimes played songs on tape from local artists. One of these, "Somerville", was a satirical comment on that local city, written by David Misch, who later wrote for the TV shows Mork and Mindy and Saturday Night Live. Another was "Marblehead Morning", a gentle acoustic homage to the town of Marblehead written by Mason Daring, who soon became the composer for most of John Sayles's films.

In 1974 and then again in 1975, WCAS was almost sold to religious broadcasters. However, in both of those situations, there was a loud public outcry which disrupted the sales, and enabled WCAS to last as long as it did—singer David Misch played a key role in organizing these. The format continued even after Kaiser finally sold the station in 1976, but the station's local popularity was never sufficient to make it very profitable, and Dan Murphy and Mel Stone (whose Wickus Island Broadcasting owned WCAS through the latter half of the 1970s) were obliged to declare bankruptcy at the start of the 1980s after suffering increasing losses. WCAS finally went under in early 1981; the rest of the 1980s saw a revolving door of owners, call signs, and formats, eventually becoming black gospel station WLVG ("We Love God").

=== Under Bob Bittner ===
In the summer of 1991, Bob Bittner purchased WLVG, and changed the station's format to "Earth Radio" (a blend of contemporary music with environmentally-aware public service spots) under the call letters WWEA.

The WJIB call letters were applied for by Bittner in 1992 and were granted to him by the Federal Communications Commission (FCC) for the 740 station in Cambridge. Once having gained the WJIB call letters, Bittner switched the station to beautiful music on August 4, 1992, expanding it slightly as the station gained success, and then gradually morphed it into an adult standards station with a slight remainder of beautiful music in the mix, totally programmed by Bittner. The playlist drew from 5,400 records, concentrating on adult standards from the 1930s through the 1960s, and softer pop music from the 1950s and 1960s. The station's studio still occupies a section of the original building owned by Harvey Radio Labs, the original proprietors of WXHR and WTAO.

Originally a daytime-only station, WJIB gained nighttime power in the early 1990s with an output of five watts. Despite this meager power, WJIB's nighttime signal could be heard inside of Massachusetts Route 128; just outside the 128 belt, listeners usually got Toronto's CFZM at night, with a format similar to that of WJIB.

From 1997 through 2016, Bittner purchased several other stations in Maine to broadcast a similar music format on WJTO in Bath, WLAM in Lewiston, WLVP in Gorham, and WJYE in Gardiner (WJYE was sold in 2019 and became WHTP).

During the spring and summer of 2006, a small construction developer circulated a petition in the local Fresh Pond, Cambridge, neighborhood to gauge community support or opposition for tearing down the Concord Avenue buildings that originally housed WTAO and currently house WJIB. The firm proposed the removal of the buildings owned by Cambridge Self Storage, a rental storage company, and their replacement with 220+ three-to-four-story condominiums and townhouses. The proposal ran into considerable community opposition, citing traffic congestion on Concord Avenue and surrounding roads.

On August 4, 2017, the station began simulcasting on an FM translator at 101.3 MHz, W267CE.

Bob Bittner died at the age of 73 in May 2023. The station remained on the air through its ongoing use of automation.

=== Sale to John Garabedian ===
In January 2024, Bittner's estate announced that John Garabedian—broadcaster and former host of the syndicated radio show Open House Party—would acquire WJIB and translator W267CE. The purchase, at a price of $575,000, was consummated on March 28, 2024. Garabedian made several changes to the station's format, including expanding its music library to include more soft adult contemporary music through to the early 1990s (while still preserving the adult standards core of the format), streaming its programming online for the first time, and tweaking its tagline from "The Memory Station" to "The Memories Channel" (as Garabedian thought the former reminded him too much of memory care). The station also began using the jingle package of the original WJIB. Garabedian stated that WJIB would retain its listener-supported, commercial-free model, and stated that its next fundraising drive would occur in 2025.

Garabedian arranged to move the station's frequency to 720 kHz, in addition to a power boost, which was expected to take place in the fall of 2024. However, before the change could take place, WJTO in Bath needed to move from 730 to 750 kHz. WJIB began operation on 720 kHz on March 23, 2025.

== Fundraising ==
When a change in the BMI and ASCAP licensing was tied to ratings in 2007, the fees WJIB was to pay increased by a factor of six. On March 13, 2007, following the station's traditional noon broadcast of the national anthem, Bob Bittner announced that the station would begin accepting non-tax-deductible listener donations, seeking to raise approximately $88,000 annually to pay the station's operating expenses, which did not include any salary to Bittner. Bittner specified that donations should be personal checks; no credit cards would be accepted, since doing so would direct fees to lenders who encourage America's mass indebtedness. An announcement was made at 5 p.m. on April 25, 2007, that six weeks after the initial announcement, WJIB had reached its fundraising goal.

In ensuing years, Bittner conducted similar annual fundraising drives, and thanks to loyal listeners, he was able to raise the money to keep the station on the air. In addition to listener donations, some Sunday-morning programming time was sold to local churches and religious organizations, which added to the station's revenue.

== Translator ==
Broadcast translator for WJIB
Call sign	Frequency	City of license	FID	ERP (W)	Class	Transmitter coordinates	FCC info
W267CE	101.3 FM	Cambridge, Massachusetts	145374	250	D	42°23′13.3″N 71°8′19.19″W	LMS
