= WCME =

- Brunswick, Maine; United States
- Broadcast area: Mid Coast of Maine
- Frequency: 900 kHz
- Branding: Radio Midcoast WCME 99.5 FM & 900 AM

Programming
- Format: Full service adult contemporary
- Affiliations: Westwood One; Boston Bruins Radio Network

Ownership
- Owner: James B. Bleikamp

History
- First air date: December 16, 1955
- Former call signs: WCME (1955–1973); WKXA (1973–1988); WCLZ (1988–1998); WJJB (1998–2008); WWBK (2008–2009)

Technical information
- Licensing authority: FCC
- Facility ID: 56570
- Class: D
- Power: 700 watts (daytime); 26 watts (nighttime)
- Transmitter coordinates: 43°54′41.99″N 70°1′27.98″W
- Translator: 99.5 W258DI (Brunswick)

Links
- Public license information: Public file; LMS
- Webcast: Listen live
- Website: radiomidcoastwcme.com

WCME (900 kHz; "Radio Midcoast") is a commercial AM radio station licensed to Brunswick, Maine, and serving Maine's Mid Coast; on-air, the station is known as "Radio Midcoast WCME 99-5 FM & 900 AM". Established in 1955, the station is owned by veteran radio news anchor and talk host Jim Bleikamp, and programs a locally-oriented, full-service oldies/soft rock radio format emphasizing news and local events. WCME's studios are in the Fort Andross complex in Brunswick. WCME's transmitter is located along U.S. Route 1 near Durham Road in Brunswick.

WCME operates with 700 watts by day but must reduce power to 26 watts at night because 900 kHz is a Mexican and Canadian clear channel frequency and WCME cannot interfere with more powerful stations at 900 AM.

== History ==
WCME signed on December 16, 1955, under the ownership of Westminster Broadcasting Corporation. Central Maine Broadcasting System acquired the station in 1964, and launched a sister station on 98.9 FM on April 11, 1965. The WCME stations were sold to WCME Inc. in 1969, and to Condit Broadcasting in 1972.

By 1973, WCME and WCME-FM simulcast a contemporary format; later that year, the call letters were changed to WKXA. The following year, the WKXA stations were sold to Amcom Corporation and implemented a mix of talk and MOR. In 1977, the simulcast was dissolved, and WKXA flipped to top 40; a year later, the station reverted to simulcasting with WKXA-FM, by then a country station. Independent programming again resumed in 1980, this time with a news/talk format; this continued after Windward Communications bought the station in 1982, but by 1984 WKXA had adopted an adult contemporary format (separate from that on the newly renamed WCLZ), which gave way by 1987 to a return of the country format.

Hawthorne Communications acquired the station in 1988, and changed its call letters to WCLZ to reflect the resumption of the simulcast with WCLZ-FM; in 1990, the station again dropped the simulcast, affiliating with the Business Radio Network. This format continued as the stations were sold to The Eastern Radio Company in 1990 and to Riverside Broadcasting in 1992. The station subsequently returned to simulcasting WCLZ-FM, by then an adult album alternative station, but separate programming was restored to the AM station again in 1995, this time with home shopping.

In 1998, Riverside Broadcasting sold the WCLZ stations to Fuller-Jeffrey Broadcasting, with Riverside owner Mike Waggoner citing the company's local ownership. Co-owner J. J. Jeffrey, a native of Brunswick, had started his career at WCME. That December, the station changed its call letters to WJJB, and after a brief return to the WCLZ-FM simulcast, the station became a simulcast of sports station WJAE in 1999. Fuller-Jeffrey sold their FM stations to Citadel Broadcasting several months later, but J. J. Jeffrey retained WJAE and WJJB as the first stations in his Atlantic Coast Radio group.

WJJB changed its call letters to WWBK on March 18, 2008; a month later, the station was sold to Bob Bittner for $27,000. Three months later, on July 19, 2008, WWBK was forced off the air, as the owner of the station's transmission facility, Saga Communications (which acquired the site after buying WCLZ from Citadel in 2007), indicated that it no longer wanted WWBK on the site. The station announced its intention to move its transmitter to a location at or near the transmitter of sister station WJTO. Bittner had planned to implement a music format, separate from WJTO's adult standards and oldies programming.

Bob Bittner sold WWBK to James Bleikamp in March 2009, with the sale being finalized on May 18; the next day, the station changed its call letters back to WCME, which had recently been given up by WTQX. On May 23, 2009, WCME resumed broadcasting under special temporary authority from the WJTO site; this was necessary because the station could only operate at 176 watts during daytime hours from the site to protect WGHM in Nashua, New Hampshire — below the minimum daytime power for licensed AM stations of 250 watts. After the WJTO site was deemed to not be optimal for regular operation, WCME signed off once again on May 25.

WCME again resumed broadcasting on April 21, 2010, operating under special temporary authority from a temporary transmitter at Fort Andross as the station seeks a new permanent transmitter (with the station planning to reach full power in fall 2010). However, it again left the air on May 7 after the transmitter was found to be interfering with fire alarm, telephone, and computer systems in the building. The station was unable to resolve the interference, and continued to search for a permanent transmitter location; in the meantime, to preserve the broadcast license, WCME again temporarily broadcast from the WJTO site on April 16, 2011, and from April 25–26, 2011. The station finally received approval from the Brunswick Town Council to build a tower on Old Portland Road in West Brunswick in October 2011. After operating from the WJTO site once more from April 14–15, 2012, WCME signed on from the new tower on October 17, 2012, programming an adult contemporary format focusing on the 1970s to 1990s while it hired its staff; the station also played Christmas music during the holiday season.

== Translator ==
Broadcast translator for WCME
Call sign	Frequency	City of license	FID	ERP (W)	Class	Transmitter coordinates	FCC info
W258DI	99.5 FM	Brunswick, Maine	200836	250	D	43°54′41.9″N 70°1′27.9″W	LMS
