= WYNZ =

Radio station in South Portland, Maine

- South Portland, Maine; United States
- Broadcast area: Portland metropolitan area
- Frequency: 100.9 MHz (HD Radio)
- Branding: Whoopie 100.9

Programming
- Format: Adult hits
- Subchannels: HD2: Oldies "Pure Oldies 105.5"; HD3: Classic country "101.5 The Outlaw"

Ownership
- Owner: Saga Communications; (Saga Communications of New England, LLC)
- Sister stations: WBAE; WVAE; WGAN; WZAN; WMGX; WCLZ; WPOR

History
- First air date: January 13, 1976 (as WRQN, Westbrook)
- Former call signs: WRQN (1976–1977); WLOB-FM (1977–1980); WYNZ-FM (1980–1993)

Technical information
- Licensing authority: FCC
- Facility ID: 58536
- Class: B1
- ERP: 25,000 watts
- HAAT: 93 meters (305 ft)
- Transmitter coordinates: 43.691°N 70.318°W
- Translators: HD2: 105.5 W288CU (Portland); HD3: 101.5 W268CS (Portland)

Links
- Public license information: Public file; LMS
- Webcast: Listen live; HD2: Listen live
- Website: whoopie1009.com; HD2: pureoldies1055.com; HD3: theoutlawportland.com

WYNZ (100.9 FM, "Whoopie 100.9"), is a commercial radio station licensed to South Portland, Maine, United States, and serving the Portland metropolitan area. It is owned by Saga Communications and airs an adult hits radio format. The studios and offices are on Western Avenue in South Portland.

WYNZ has an effective radiated power (ERP) of 25,000 watts, but from a tower at only 93 meters (305 ft) in height above average terrain (HAAT), limiting its coverage area. That provides a more constrained signal than most other Portland stations, especially its main competitors of WBLM and WFNK, which are powered at 100,000 watts from significantly taller towers. WYNZ's transmitter is behind the studios in South Portland, near the Maine Turnpike.

== History ==
=== WRQN and WLOB-FM ===
On January 13, 1976, the station signed on as WRQN. It was a hot adult contemporary station. WRQN originally was licensed to Westbrook and owned by Japat, Inc.

WRQN was powered at less than 1,000 watts, only heard in Portland and its adjacent suburbs. In 1977, it was sold to the owners of WLOB (1310 AM), whose management changed the FM station to album-oriented rock (AOR) as WLOB-FM.

=== Portland's Best Rock ===
In the late 1970s, WLOB-FM was known as "FM 101 - Portland's Best Rock", giving progressive rock station WBLM (107.5 FM) some serious competition and sometimes beating WBLM in the ratings as well. In late 1980, the station was sold to Eastman Broadcasting, which was also in the process of purchasing WCSH (970 AM).

Eastman changed WLOB-FM's call sign to WYNZ-FM in December 1980, while AM 970 became WYNZ, simulcasting the FM station. The AOR format remained. For the next year, the station was known as "Z101 - Portland's Best Rock". Some of the DJs on WYNZ-FM included Danny Shewster, G.V. Rapp, John Clark, Karen (Tucker) Payson, Bennie Green, Scott Schuster, Will Jackson and Jeff Spicer.

=== Adult contemporary and oldies ===
Eastman changed WYNZ-FM to an adult contemporary music format in November 1981, calling the station Y101. At that point, Z101 veteran John Clark defected to WBLM and the new on-air line-up included morning man Bob Rose as well as Dean Rogers, Andy Kosinski and later Ted Talbot. WYNZ-AM-FM were sold to Buckley Broadcasting in the mid-1980s.

In 1989, WYNZ changed formats to oldies. It was known as "Portland's Solid Gold, Y101-FM" playing hits from the 1950s, 1960s and 1970s. Bob Rose remained on mornings as well as Ted Talbot handling afternoons. Andy Kosinski was the evening voice. Chuck Igo joined the station to handle middays. Bob Rose exited the station in the early 1990s and Dean Rogers returned to the FM side of the WYNZ operation to handle mornings.

=== Sale to Saga ===
In 1993, WYNZ-AM-FM were bought by Saga Communications for $350,000. Saga switched AM 970 to a hot talk format as WZAN, while the FM station was re-branded as "Oldies 100.9 WYNZ". The on-air staff included Dean Rogers, Chuck Igo and Ted Talbot. After the departure of Igo (1994) and Rogers (1997), Bob Anderson assumed mornings until his death in 2003 while hosting his Saturday morning shift. Igo, who had returned to the station in late 2001 to handle afternoons, moved into the morning show. Corey Garrison, Ken McGrail, Gary "The K" Koblara, Mike Kimball, Ed Petty, Jeff Pierce, Chris Harper and the late Tom Kelly (Tom Pagnotti) have handled air duties.

In 2007, WYNZ evolved, eliminating the hits of the 1950s, and moving the format forward to incorporate hits from the 1980s, re-branding as "Big Hits Y100.9". In 2009, the station changed its city of license from Westbrook to South Portland.

=== Rewind 100.9 ===
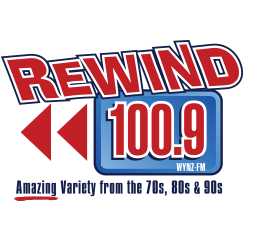
Logo as "Rewind 100.9"

In April 2013, WYNZ re-branded to "Rewind 100.9", playing hits from the late 1960s, 1970s and 1980s.

Around 2015, the station began focusing on a playlist from the 1970s, 1980s and 1990s. The main competitor for WYNZ is Binnie-owned classic hits station WFNK. While WYNZ plays some pop and dance hits from artists such as Michael Jackson and Madonna, Frank FM leans more toward classic rock.

=== Whoopie 100.9 ===
On March 27, 2023, WYNZ shifted to adult hits, branded as "Whoopie 100.9", the name coming from the whoopie pie, the official state treat of Maine. With the change, the station expanded the classic hits playlist to include more recent songs, the library now ranging from the 1980s to the early 2010s.

== HD Radio ==
On November 1, 2019, WYNZ launched an oldies format on its HD2 subchannel, branded as "Pure Oldies 105.5" in reflection of its simulcast on translator station W288CU (105.5 FM).

In June 2026, WYNZ's HD3 subchannel became the primary station for W268CS (101.5 FM), which carries classic country as "The Outlaw"; this format previously originated on WZAN.

Broadcast translators for WYNZ
Call sign	Frequency	City of license	FID	ERP (W)	Class	Transmitter coordinates	FCC info	Notes
W288CU	105.5 FM	Portland, Maine	150422	200	D	43°41′26.3″N 70°19′3.2″W	LMS	Relays HD2
W268CS	101.5 FM	Portland, Maine	148099	99	D	43°41′26.3″N 70°19′3.2″W	LMS	Relays HD3
