= WMGX =

Radio station in Portland, Maine

- Portland, Maine; United States
- Broadcast area: Portland metropolitan area
- Frequency: 93.1 MHz (HD Radio)
- Branding: Coast 93-1

Programming
- Language: English
- Format: Adult Top 40
- Subchannels: HD2: News/talk (simulcast of WGAN); HD3: Christian radio (Bible Broadcasting Network)

Ownership
- Owner: Saga Communications; (Saga Communications of New England, LLC)
- Sister stations: WBAE; WCLZ; WGAN; WPOR; WVAE; WYNZ

History
- First air date: June 10, 1977
- Call sign meaning: "Magic" (former branding)

Technical information
- Licensing authority: FCC
- Facility ID: 58548
- Class: B
- ERP: 50,000 watts
- HAAT: 135 meters (443 ft)
- Transmitter coordinates: 43.688°N 70.257°W
- Translator: HD3: 105.1 W286CU (Saco)

Links
- Public license information: Public file; LMS
- Webcast: Listen live
- Website: coast931.com

WMGX (93.1 MHz "Coast 93.1") is a commercial radio station in Portland, Maine, United States, serving the Portland metropolitan area. WMGX airs an Adult Top 40 radio format and is owned by Saga Communications. Its studios and offices are on Western Avenue in South Portland.

WMGX has an effective radiated power (ERP) of 50,000 watts, its transmitter is located off Presumpscot Street in Portland, near Interstate 295. WMGX broadcasts in the HD Radio hybrid format; its HD2 subchannel carries the talk radio programming of sister station WGAN, while its HD3 subchannel carries the Bible Broadcasting Network's Christian radio programming, which feeds FM translator W286CU at 105.1 MHz in Saco, Maine.

== History ==
WMGX first signed on the air on June 10, 1977. It was owned by Sunshine Broadcasting and played a soft rock format as "Magic 93". Core artists included James Taylor, Carole King, Cat Stevens and Carly Simon. Announcers did not talk over the music. Several songs were played in a row, with no talking in between songs.

From the mid-to-late-1980s and through the 1990s, WMGX had a unique format, blending classic, soft, and progressive rock with adult contemporary music. At this time, the station claimed that "[It] never [played] the same song twice [in one 24-hour period]," a boast that it later backed up with a monetary prize to anyone who caught the station doing so.

In 1992, WMGX and WGAN were acquired by Saga Communications. On March 9, 2006, 29 years after the station's launch, WMGX changed format, rebranding as "Coast 93.1", and shifted to a hot adult contemporary format, playing music from the "80s, 90s and Now".

WMGX eventually dropped the "80s, 90s and Now" slogan and changed it to "Today's Best Mix" to reflect the playlist from the current and recent Top 40 charts, minus any songs deemed too hard-edged or rap-oriented. Songs from the last couple of decades also were heard, but WMGX rarely played any song recorded before 1990.

As of April 2016, to compete more with long dominant Top 40 station WJBQ, WMGX shifted to an Adult Top 40 format under the branding of "Portland's Adult Hit Music Station". The station currently acts as a hybrid between a hot AC and a mainstream Top 40 station. On Sunday mornings, WMGX airs the nationally syndicated show American Top 40 with Ryan Seacrest.

== The Blake Show (Coast Morning Show) ==
Portland's most popular morning show, the Blake Show with Kelly and Todd starts the day with laughs, fun, topical content, and relatable topics. The show features cohosts Blake Hayes and Kelly Towle. WCSH meteorologist Todd Gutner is a contributing third co-host.

Blake Hayes is open about being gay and sometimes discusses life as a gay man.

After 15 years with the station, former morning co-host Eva Matteson left the station in February 2020.

== Translator ==
Broadcast translator for WMGX-HD3
Call sign	Frequency	City of license	FID	ERP (W)	Class	Transmitter coordinates	FCC info
W286CU	105.1 FM	Saco, Maine	138684	190	D	43°32′38.3″N 70°24′14.2″W	LMS
