= WLAM =

- Lewiston, Maine; United States
- Broadcast area: Lewiston–Auburn
- Frequency: 1470 kHz
- Branding: 1470 & 97.3 The Memories Stations

Programming
- Format: Adult standards; oldies

Ownership
- Owner: Robert Bittner; (Blue Jey Broadcasting Co.)

History
- First air date: September 4, 1947
- Former call signs: WLAM (1947–1990); WKZN (1990–1993); WZOU (1993–2001)
- Call sign meaning: Lewiston–Auburn, Maine

Technical information
- Licensing authority: FCC
- Facility ID: 64434
- Class: B
- Power: 5,000 watts (unlimited)
- Transmitter coordinates: 44°3′47.27″N 70°14′58.2″W
- Translator: 97.3 W247DK (Lewiston)

Links
- Public license information: Public file; LMS

WLAM (1470 AM) is a radio station formerly broadcasting an adult standards and oldies format. Licensed to Lewiston, Maine, United States, the station serves the Lewiston–Auburn area. Established in 1947, the station is owned by the estate of Robert Bittner through licensee Blue Jey Broadcasting Co. Its 5,000-watt signal can be heard at day throughout most of Southern Maine and portions of New Hampshire and Massachusetts, and at night throughout most of New England and portions of New York and Canada.

== History ==
WLAM first went on the air September 4, 1947. The station initially aired various programs, including ABC Radio programming, music, and local sports coverage. An FM sister station on 100.1, WWAV (now WTHT on 99.9) was launched in 1977. The station became WKZN on December 26, 1990, swapping call letters with its sister station in Gorham on 870; when the two stations began broadcasting a standards format. A third station, WJTO in Bath, was part of the simulcast under a local marketing agreement from April 2, 1993, to August 1995. On July 19, 1993, WKZN changed its call sign to WZOU.

Wireless Talking Machine Company sold WZOU, WLAM, and WLAM-FM (106.7 FM, which had launched in 1996 as an FM simulcast of the stations; it is now WXTP), along with 99.9 (by then WMWX) and WTHT (107.5 FM; now WFNK) to Harron Communications, then-owner of WMTW-TV, in 1999. On May 21, 2001, Harron restored the WLAM call letters to the station; two weeks prior to this, 870 and 106.7 were converted to news/talk as WMTW. While WLAM initially retained the standards format, on November 26, the station was switched to a simulcast of WMTW; shortly afterwards, talk programming was removed from the stations in favor of an all-news format, mainly from the Associated Press's All-News Radio service.

After Harron sold its Maine radio stations to Nassau Broadcasting Partners in 2004, Newsradio WMTW was discontinued that April. Nassau also introduced three separate formats to the stations, with WLAM reverting to standards. This incarnation of the format would prove short-lived; in late 2005, the station switched to ESPN Radio.

One of WLAM's personalities during its standards incarnations was Bud Sawyer, a longtime staple of Portland-area radio stations such as WPOR, who was the station's morning host from 1998 until the 2001 switch to news/talk, and again during the mid-2000s restoration of the standards format.

WLAM had planned to drop ESPN Radio in favor of programming from Boston's WEEI in January 2008, but the deal between Nassau and Entercom ended up collapsing. The ESPN Radio format would remain until February 2, 2009, when WLAM and WLVP switched to an oldies format. In conjunction with the change, the stations began simulcasting WCSH's morning and early evening newscasts, a move made to continue the newscasts' availability via radio even after WCSH's own 87.7 MHz audio was discontinued following the shutdown of analog television signals.

Initially locally programmed, in early 2010 WLAM and WLVP became affiliates of The True Oldies Channel. Additionally, on August 2, the station added The Jeff Santos Show from WWZN in Boston. The stations' format was modified once more on August 6, 2011, when sports talk was re-added to the schedule via locally produced shows and high school football and basketball from the Maine Sports Network (which previously provided some weekend programming to WJJB-FM).

WLAM, along with 16 other Nassau stations in northern New England, was purchased at bankruptcy auction by WBIN Media Company, a company controlled by Bill Binnie, on May 22, 2012. Binnie already owned WBIN-TV in Derry, New Hampshire. The deal was completed on November 30, 2012. In June 2014, WLAM and WLVP switched to Cumulus Media's Good Time Oldies service after Cumulus ended distribution of The True Oldies Channel.

On December 9, 2015, Binnie agreed to sell WLAM and WLVP to Blue Jey Broadcasting Company, controlled by Bob Bittner, for $135,000. The sale to Blue Jey Broadcasting was consummated on February 17, 2016. Bittner evolved the stations' format to a playlist similar to (but separate from) his existing Maine property, WJTO in Bath; by 2021, WLAM and WLVP had become separately programmed and automated from their transmitter sites, though continuing to feature a similar playlist of soft adult contemporary and standards to Bittner's flagship network of WJTO, WJIB in Cambridge, Massachusetts, and WBAS on Cape Cod.

Bittner died on May 26, 2023, and the station has been operated by Bob Perry on behalf of his estate since then. On March 31, 2025, Perry announced that WLAM and WJTO would cease broadcasting on April 13, 2025, because donations were not keeping pace with the cost of operating and maintaining the stations; WLVP had already left the air in October 2024. Days before the scheduled shutdown, Perry announced that WLAM and WJTO would continue operating after April 13 during negotiations with potential buyers for the stations, saying that "it is better for us to keep them on the air for the immediate future". WLAM ultimately went silent on August 14, several weeks after WJTO was shut down on July 27; Perry attributed the shutdown to the cost of power and utilities, while reiterating the Bittner estate's intention to sell the station.

WLAM returned to the air on June 10, 2026. In November 2026, Blue Jey Broadcasting agreed to sell the station to Robert Pearce's TenKev Broadcasting for $120,000; WLAM was the last station to still be held by the Bittner estate.

== Translator ==
Broadcast translator for WLAM
| Call sign | Frequency | City of license | FID | ERP (W) | Class | Transmitter coordinates | FCC info |
|---|---|---|---|---|---|---|---|
| W247DK | 97.3 FM | Lewiston, Maine | 202492 | 250 | D | 44°3′47.3″N 70°14′59.2″W | LMS |
