= WGME-TV =

Television station in Portland, Maine

- Portland, Maine; United States
- Channels: Digital: 15 (UHF); Virtual: 13
- Branding: CBS 13; Fox 23 (13.2)

Programming
- Affiliations: 13.1: CBS; 13.2: Fox; 13.3: The Nest

Ownership
- Owner: Sinclair Broadcast Group; (WGME Licensee, LLC)
- Sister stations: WPFO

History
- First air date: May 16, 1954
- Former call signs: WGAN-TV (1954–1983)
- Former channel numbers: Analog: 13 (VHF, 1954–2009); Digital: 38 (UHF, 2002–2019)
- Former affiliations: ABC (1954–1958)
- Call sign meaning: "We're Gannett of Maine", for former owner Guy Gannett

Technical information
- Licensing authority: FCC
- Facility ID: 25683
- ERP: 1,000 kW
- HAAT: 500 m (1,640 ft)
- Transmitter coordinates: 43°55′29″N 70°29′27″W

Links
- Public license information: Public file; LMS
- Website: 13.1: wgme.com; 13.2: fox23maine.com

WGME-TV (channel 13) is a television station in Portland, Maine, United States, affiliated with CBS and Fox. It is owned by Sinclair Broadcast Group alongside WPFO (channel 23). The two stations share studios on Northport Drive in the North Deering section of Portland; WGME-TV's transmitter is located on Brown Hill northwest of Raymond, Maine.

Channel 13 began broadcasting on May 16, 1954, as WGAN-TV. It was owned by Guy Gannett Broadcasting Services, owner of radio station WGAN in Portland and publisher of several Maine newspapers including the Portland Press Herald. It was an affiliate of CBS and ABC at the outset and broadcast from a facility shared with the Press Herald in downtown Portland. In 1959, transmission moved to the Brown Hill site, with a 1,619-foot (493 m) tower that was briefly the world's tallest man-made structure, and the station occupied its present studio facility in 1977. After WGAN radio was separated from the TV station in 1983, channel 13 changed its call sign to WGME—"We're Gannett of Maine"—on January 1, 1984. It was the leading TV news station in Maine until the mid-1980s, when it was surpassed by WCSH (channel 6).

Guy Gannett sold its business assets in the late 1990s, with the television station group being purchased by Sinclair. In 2007, Sinclair began producing a 10 p.m. newscast for WPFO, then the Portland market's Fox affiliate; it bought the non-license assets in 2013, continuing to produce local news for WPFO until the Fox subchannel outright moved to WGME-TV in December 2025.

== History ==
=== Construction and early years ===
When the Federal Communications Commission (FCC) resumed granting new TV station applications in 1952 after a multi-year freeze, it allocated Portland, Maine, two VHF channels, 6 and 13. The freeze had affected the first television station application in Maine, made by Guy Gannett Broadcasting Services, (Note: Of no relation to the Gannett Company.) owners of radio stations WGAN in Portland and WGUY in Bangor. In May 1952, Guy Gannett announced its intention to apply for channel 13. Later in 1952, the Community Broadcasting Service, owner of Bangor radio station WABI, applied for channel 13 in Portland. With competing applications, channel 13 was pushed into a comparative hearing situation, and the FCC in October 1952 ordered hearings be held on the two applications apiece it had received for channels 6 and 13.

A third channel played into the channel 13 hearing dispute. Channel 8 had been allocated for use at Mount Washington, New Hampshire, from which it would cover Portland, and Mount Washington TV, Inc., was seeking that channel. Mount Washington and Community had a stakeholder in common: Horace Hildreth. In May 1953, Guy Gannett called on Hildreth to select one or the other application to prosecute because he could not own both channels, with their overlapping coverage areas. On July 8, 1953, Mount Washington TV won the construction permit for channel 8, on the condition that its stockholders remove themselves from competing applications in Portland; these included not only Hildreth but the owners of an applicant for channel 6. If they did so, each channel would have one contested applicant. Another stockholder in Community, Murray Carpenter, declared he had no intention to drop out of the channel 13 contest. Carpenter responded to the FCC action by selling his ownership interest in WABI radio and WABI-TV to Hildreth in exchange for his shares in the channel 13 applicant. He then filed for channel 13 under his own name in August.

On November 2, days before hearings were to begin, Carpenter simultaneously withdrew his channel 13 application and agreed to buy WGUY radio from Guy Gannett. He told the FCC that he had been unable to find financial backing for the TV station. This left Guy Gannett unopposed for channel 13; the firm received a construction permit on November 19 and declared its intention to be on the air within six months. The WGAN-FM site at Blackstrap in Falmouth was renovated to house the channel 13 transmitter facility; it had been built in 1946 with a possible television use in mind.

WGAN-TV began broadcasting on May 16, 1954, as a primary affiliate of CBS with additional programming from ABC. It was the fifth TV station on the air in Maine; it displaced the combination of WPMT (channel 53) and WLAM-TV (channel 17), a pair of UHF stations in Portland and Lewiston–Auburn, as the local outlet for CBS and ABC programs. At the outset, WGAN-TV offered a variety of local programs. Three newscasts a day were scheduled, utilizing the resources of Guy Gannett's five Maine newspapers; it also aired a daily afternoon variety show, The Lloyd Knight Show, and locally produced educational and nature programs. The station broadcast from an incomplete tower on reduced power until June 30. Channel 8 from Mount Washington debuted in September as WMTW. It had affiliations with CBS, ABC, and DuMont Television Network, splitting much of channel 13's audience for network programming. WMTW continued to air some CBS programs until July 1958, when it became an all-ABC station. In addition to its main studio at 390 Congress, WGAN-TV maintained a "sidewalk studio" at street level at High and Congress streets.

WGAN announced its intention to build a new, taller TV tower in 1958. Such an expansion had been contemplated from the start, but an attempt to shuffle VHF television station allocations in New England—and possibly force WGAN-TV to another channel—stalled the move. A 1,619-foot (493 m) mast was erected on Brown Hill near Raymond and began use on October 30, 1959. It was the world's tallest man-made structure at its completion, though the next year KFVS-TV in Cape Girardeau, Missouri, eclipsed it with a 1,676-foot (511 m) tower. While WGAN-TV was still losing money by 1961, the station improved its financial standing by the middle of the decade and attracted more than 40 percent of TV advertising revenue. In February 1967, WGAN-FM 102.9 began broadcasting from the Raymond tower.

Operations of WGAN AM and WGAN-TV moved in 1977 from downtown Portland to space in part of a former W. T. Grant department store in Portland's Northport Plaza shopping center. (Note: The facility became the Northport Business Park in the 1980s when the other tenant of the Grant space, Ames Department Stores, closed and was replaced with a call center for L.L.Bean.) When the radio stations were sold to Taylor Communications of Maine during 1983, the WGAN call letters remained with them; WGAN-TV became WGME-TV, "We're Gannett of Maine", on January 1, 1984. (Note: The call sign changed from WGAN-TV to WGME-TV at the FCC on December 15, 1983. However, the station did not begin using the new call sign until January 1, 1984.)

Channel 13 had been the traditional news leader in the Portland market until the mid-1980s. In February 1986, WCSH surpassed WGME at 11 p.m. and tied channel 13 in the vital 6 p.m. news slot. Later that year, WCSH would surpass WGME at 6 and proceed to do so for at least the next 16 years. In 1989, WGME debuted a 5:30 p.m. newscast, 1st News. It was the first time a Portland station had produced an hour of early evening news since WCSH tried the idea in the 1970s. Further news expansions came in 1993 with the debut of Daybreak, a morning newscast, and in 1997 with a 5 p.m. news half-hour. The latter helped give WGME the edge over WCSH in the 5:30 p.m. half-hour where the two stations competed.

=== Sinclair ownership ===
Motivated by the impending expiration of the family trust that owned the company and a seller's market for broadcasting properties, Guy Gannett Communications put itself up for sale in 1998, ending 110 years of its history as a publisher. The Seattle Times Company acquired Guy Gannett's newspapers, while the firm's television stations were purchased by Baltimore-based Sinclair Broadcast Group for $310 million. WGME-TV had been the last major station in Portland to be locally owned. The Guy Gannett purchase gave Sinclair diversification into affiliates of the Big Three networks and beyond a portfolio heavy with Fox, WB, and UPN stations. The transaction closed on April 30, 1999. One of the first moves made under Sinclair was the cancellation of weekend morning and noon newscasts in order to focus resources on weekday news programs with more viewers. By 2011, WGME was still in second place to WCSH in the evening news ratings, especially at 6 p.m., where channel 6 had more than twice as many viewers.

On February 5, 2007, WGME-TV began producing a nightly 10 p.m. newscast for WPFO (channel 23), then Portland's Fox affiliate, after a news share agreement was established between the two. It aired from a secondary set at WGME's studios. The news relationship expanded in 2010 when the newscast was lengthened to an hour; a new two-hour morning newscast from 7 to 9 a.m., titled Good Day Maine, was added. In October 2013, Sinclair acquired the non-license assets of WPFO from Corporate Media Consultants Group for $13.6 million. An affiliate of Sinclair, Cunningham Broadcasting Corporation, filed to acquire the license assets for $3.4 million on November 19, but the deal was not approved until June 23, 2017. In 2024, WGME began airing a new lifestyle program, ARC Maine, at 9 a.m.; the WPFO morning newscast was shortened to an hour, with the 8 a.m. hour replaced by The National Desk.

Sinclair filed to buy WPFO outright from Cunningham in August 2025, following a decision by the United States Court of Appeals for the Eighth Circuit that struck down limitations on ownership of two of the four highest-rated TV stations in a market. On December 8, 2025, the Fox affiliation was moved to WGME-TV's second subchannel, while WPFO's main channel flipped to Roar. As of December 2025, WGME–CBS airs 29 1/2 hours a week of local news programs, not including news on WGME–Fox.

In addition to WGME, Sinclair owns Dielectric, a manufacturer of antennas located in Raymond that it purchased in 2013.

== Notable former on-air staff ==
- Tom Caron – sportscaster, 1988–1993
- Paul Dellegatto – meteorologist, 1985
- Frank Fixaris – sportscaster, 1965–1995

== Subchannels ==
WGME-TV's transmitter is located northwest of Raymond, Maine. The station's signal is multiplexed:

Subchannels of WGME-TV
Subchannel	Res.	Short name	Programming
13.1	720p	CBS	CBS
13.2	720p	FOX	Fox
13.3	480i	TheNest	The Nest
23.1	480i	ROAR	Roar (WPFO)
23.4	480i	Antenna	Antenna TV (WPFO)

Broadcast on behalf of another station

== Notes ==
Records
Preceded by KOBR-TV Tower	World's tallest structure 1,619 ft (493.5 m); 1959–1960	Succeeded by KFVS TV Mast
