= WJTO =

- Bath, Maine; United States
- Broadcast area: Greater Portland
- Frequency: 750 kHz
- Branding: 750 & 105.3 WJTO; Bob's Memory Station

Programming
- Format: Adult standards; oldies

Ownership
- Owner: Bob Bittner Broadcasting; (Blue Jey Broadcasting Company, Inc.)
- Sister stations: WLAM; WLVP

History
- First air date: September 1957
- Last air date: July 27, 2025
- Former call signs: WMMS (1957–1964)
- Former frequencies: 730 kHz (1957–2024)
- Call sign meaning: Jet-assisted take-off

Technical information
- Licensing authority: FCC
- Facility ID: 33287
- Class: D
- Power: 1,000 watts (day); 23 watts (night)
- Transmitter coordinates: 43°52′35″N 69°50′49″W
- Translator: 105.3 W287DD (Bath)

Links
- Public license information: Public file; LMS
- Webcast: Listen live
- Website: www.bobsmemorystation.com

WJTO (750 AM) was a radio station licensed to Bath, Maine, that last broadcast an adult standards and oldies format. WJTO was owned by Blue Jey Broadcasting Company, Inc., itself wholly owned by the estate of Bob Bittner. The station operated from 1957 to 2025, for most of its history on 730 kHz, and was known as WMMS until 1964.

== History ==
The station began broadcasting on 730 kHz in September 1957 as WMMS ("Where Most of Maine is Served") under original owner Winslow T. Porter Sr. The callsign was changed in 1964 to WJTO for "JATO" — a reference to nearby Brunswick Naval Air Station.

In the 1960s and 1970s, WJTO, with studios located in downtown Bath, gave several Portland stations real competition. In 1971, the modern two-story building was constructed at the transmitter site (the site eventually owned by Bob Bittner), and all was well until the late 1970s when FM came into fashion. WJTO had a powerful FM (WJTO-FM), which later became WIGY and WKRH; all three incarnations co-owned with WJTO. With listenership drifting to FM, the original AM station was getting less attention, drifting through several ownership changes until both stations went into bankruptcy around 1990. Off the air for 11 months, the FM was finally sold to Blount Communications and became WBCI.

In March 1991, WJTO returned to the air with oldies, airing Satellite Music Network's Kool Gold service. In August 1992, it switched to sports as an affiliate of the Sports Entertainment Network. On April 2, 1993, WJTO began simulcasting with WLAM (870 AM) in Gorham and WKZN (1470 AM) in Lewiston under a local marketing agreement. The WLAM simulcast ended in August 1995, when WJTO became a talk station.

=== Bob Bittner ===
Bob Bittner bought WJTO for $150,000 in March 1997, adding it to a group that included two Massachusetts station: WJIB in Cambridge and WNEB in Worcester. (In 1996 and 1997, he sold two of his other stations, WNEB and WKBR in Manchester, New Hampshire.) WJTO was a complete purchase: not just the station license, but also the equipment and real estate of 12 acres (4.9 ha), located on an ocean inlet. Later in 2003 and 2004, Bittner made two adjoining land and house purchases, creating a full residence 600' from the station, all situated on 220 acres (0.89 km^{2}) in West Bath, Maine. Bittner used the premises as a summer residence and kept an extensive music collection at WJTO for it and WJIB. On display at WJTO was much radio memorabilia, including many classic playlists from WABC during its "MusicRadio 77" days in the 1970s.

With Bittner's purchase in 1997, WJTO switched from talk to beautiful music with moderate results. Slowly, Bittner morphed it to an adult standards station with a lot of 1950s and 1960s oldies pop mixed in; in recent years, WJTO had an audience equivalent to the prosperity days of the 1960s and 1970s.

Typical music heard on WJTO included a blend of music from 1937 to 1980 (with a few from before and after) not heard anywhere else on the mid- and southern coast of Maine, from Frank Sinatra to Linda Ronstadt. In addition to the hits, Bittner inserted about 4 LP tracks each hour, from same and similar artists. Bittner said it all flowed quite well.

WJTO did not air any commercials, but was big on local public service announcements, including fund-raising spots aimed at keeping the station on the air. WJTO's first fundraising drive in 2008 raised $29,676.11 from 657 different listeners (including a radio fan from Goshen, New York, who actually hunted down Bob and the station after hearing it on vacation) over an eleven-week period that summer. Later fund-drives (contributions from listeners) in 2009, 2010 and 2011 were quite successful, thereby solidifying this method of support. Having allegiance to the listeners, as opposed to commercial interests, allows WJTO to have what they call a "pro-people attitude" with public service announcements and editorial opinions rarely heard on other stations.

WJTO put out a 1,000-watt daytime signal and could be heard as far away as Provincetown, Massachusetts, and Nova Scotia, with a daytime city-grade signal into Portland. (It also aired at night, but the signal did not get far with six watts.)

Blue Jey Broadcasting—the corporate entity Bittner formed in early 2000 for WJTO—purchased FM translator W252BT (98.3) in Freeport for $100,000 from Light of Light Ministries, which had used it as a relay of WWWA, to rebroadcast WJTO; it became a licensed facility on May 8, 2013. In August 2017, the W252BT license was moved to 101.3 FM in Cambridge, Massachusetts, as a WJIB translator; it was replaced in Bath with a new translator, W287DD (105.3).

In later years, WJTO served as the flagship station of a three-station network that also included WJIB and WBAS on Cape Cod; similar, but separately-automated playlists were aired on WLVP in Gorham and WLAM in Lewiston, which were acquired in 2016, and on WJYE in Gardiner, which was purchased as WFAU in 2013 and sold in 2019. Owner Bob Bittner died on May 26, 2023.

In February 2024, in connection with the sale of WJIB to John Garabedian, WJTO applied for Federal Communications Commission (FCC) approval to switch from 730 kHz to 750 kHz; this would enable WJIB to move from 740 to 720 kHz and boost its power. WJTO would make the move on August 25, 2024.

On March 31, 2025, operator Bob Perry announced that WJTO and WLAM would cease broadcasting on April 13, 2025, because donations were not keeping pace with the cost of operating and maintaining the stations. WLVP had already left the air in October 2024. Days before the scheduled shutdown, Perry announced that WJTO and WLAM would continue operating after April 13 during negotiations with potential buyers for the stations, saying that "it is better for us to keep them on the air for the immediate future". On July 27, 2025, at 11:59 pm, Perry took WJTO and its translator silent, with its soft oldies format continuing on WLAM and online. The FCC cancelled the WJTO license on August 13, 2026.

== Translator ==
Broadcast translator for WJTO
Call sign	Frequency	City of license	FID	ERP (W)	Class	Transmitter coordinates	FCC info
W287DD	105.3 FM	Bath, Maine	201072	250	D	43°52′36.3″N 69°50′49.2″W	LMS
