= WXTP =

- North Windham, Maine; United States
- Broadcast area: Portland, Maine
- Frequency: 106.7 MHz
- Branding: Relevant Radio

Programming
- Format: Catholic talk
- Network: Relevant Radio

Ownership
- Owner: Relevant Radio, Inc.

History
- First air date: 1996
- Former call signs: WVYH (1996); WLAM-FM (1996–2001); WMTW-FM (2001–2004); WHXR (2004–2010)
- Call sign meaning: "The Presence" (former branding)

Technical information
- Licensing authority: FCC
- Facility ID: 59534
- Class: A
- ERP: 810 watts
- HAAT: 190 meters (620 ft)
- Transmitter coordinates: 43°51′6.3″N 70°19′38.2″W

Links
- Public license information: Public file; LMS
- Webcast: Listen live
- Website: relevantradio.com

WXTP (106.7 FM) is a Catholic talk radio station licensed to North Windham, Maine, serving the Portland area from studios in Freeport. The station is an affiliate of Relevant Radio and is owned by Relevant Radio, Inc.

== History ==
The station signed on in 1996 as WVYH, and featured an adult standards format known as "The Jewel". The station was simulcast on sister stations WLAM (870 AM; now WLVP) in Gorham and WZOU (1470 AM) in Lewiston. A few months after signing on, the station became WLAM-FM to match the Gorham station. Portland radio legend Bud Sawyer was one of WLAM's morning hosts.

Original owner Wireless Talking Machine Company sold its stations to Harron Communications in late 1999. Harron also owned WMTW-TV, and in May 2001, the station's format changed to news/talk. The call letters of WLAM-FM became WMTW-FM, with WLAM becoming WMTW, and WZOU picking up the WLAM call letters and format for several months before reverting to a simulcast of WMTW-FM. The new station was initially known as "News/Talk WMTW"; however, soon after 1470 rejoined the simulcast, talk programming was removed from the stations in favor of an all-news format, mainly from the Associated Press's All-News Radio service. At that point, the station was rebranded to "Newsradio WMTW".

Despite advertising campaigns on WMTW-TV, the all-news format on WMTW-FM suffered low ratings. In late 2003, Harron sold its radio stations to Nassau Broadcasting. Shortly afterward, Nassau acquired Mariner Broadcasting. It became evident that changes were in the works for the Portland market.

In April 2004, "Newsradio WMTW" was discontinued. Nassau also introduced three separate formats to the stations, with WMTW-FM gaining a new simulcast partner in York County's WQEZ (104.7 FM), and both stations relaunched as classic rock-formatted "104.7/106.7 The Bone". WMTW-FM became WHXR, with WQEZ becoming WHXQ. The station attempted to go head-to-head with existing classic rock station WBLM, and added The Howard Stern Show during the mornings.

However, with Stern's decision to leave terrestrial radio, WHXR/WHXQ's mornings were put in disarray. Finally, in March 2006, WHXR/WHXQ added the Michigan-based The Free Beer and Hot Wings Show. Free Beer and Hot Wings would become one of the highest rated morning shows in the market in their target male demos, far exceeding Stern's ratings. During summer 2006, WHXR/WHXQ expanded their playlist to become an active rock station.

WHXR and WHXQ had planned to switch to sports talk provided by Boston's WEEI in January 2008, but the deal between Nassau and WEEI owner Entercom ended up collapsing.

On April 27, 2009, Nassau Broadcasting revealed to employees that WHXR would be placed in trust and divested due to a change in the corporate structure of the company. The change ended Nassau's grandfathered status regarding how many stations in the Portland market it could own. WHXQ, by then relocated to 106.3 in a frequency swap with WBQW, remained owned by the company and continued with the 'Bone' format. The simulcast continued until April 9, 2010, when WHXR began airing a loop redirecting listeners to WHXQ. The call letters were changed to WXTP on June 11, 2010, in advance of the a sale to The Presence Radio Network; on July 7, the station relaunched as "The Presence", a Catholic talk station airing largely EWTN programming. The sale was completed on August 16, 2012.

In 2018, The Presence Radio Network's stations were sold to Immaculate Heart Radio for $750,000, and on May 21, the stations became affiliates of Relevant Radio.
