= WLVP =

- Gorham, Maine; United States
- Broadcast area: Portland, Maine
- Frequency: 870 kHz
- Branding: Memories 870

Programming
- Format: Adult standards; oldies

Ownership
- Owner: Robert Bittner; (Blue Jey Broadcasting Co.)
- Sister stations: WLAM; WJTO

History
- First air date: March 3, 1980
- Last air date: May 2026
- Former call signs: WDCI (1980–1982); WASY (1982–1986); WJBQ (1986–1989); WKZN (1989–1990); WLAM (1990–2001); WMTW (2001–2004)
- Call sign meaning: "Liberal Voice of Portland" (previous format)

Technical information
- Licensing authority: FCC
- Facility ID: 24994
- Class: B
- Power: 10,000 watts (day); 1,000 watts (night)
- Transmitter coordinates: 43°39′46.29″N 70°29′39.19″W
- Translator: 105.1 W286DR (Gorham)

Links
- Public license information: Public file; LMS
- Website: www.bobsmemorystation.com

WLVP (870 AM) was a radio station broadcasting an adult standards and oldies format. Licensed to Gorham, Maine, United States, it served southern Maine, including Portland. Established in 1980 as WDCI, the station was owned by the estate of Robert Bittner through licensee Blue Jey Broadcasting Co..

== History ==
The station went on the air March 3, 1980, as WDCI on 1590. In the intervening years, the station would change its call letters to WASY and then WJBQ, the latter after coming into common ownership with WLAM (1470 AM) and WKZS (99.9 FM; now WTHT). WJBQ moved to 870 kHz in 1988; on this frequency, the station became WKZN on November 28, 1989, and then swapped call letters with WLAM on December 26, 1990. The two stations eventually began simulcasting a standards format. On April 2, 1993, WLAM began simulcasting on WJTO in Bath under a local marketing agreement; the arrangement ended in August 1995.

Wireless Talking Machine Company sold WLAM, 1470 (by then WZOU), and WLAM-FM 106.7 (which had launched in 1996 as an FM simulcast of the stations; it is now WXTP), along with 99.9 (by then WMWX) and WTHT (107.5 FM; now WFNK) to Harron Communications, then-owner of WMTW-TV, in 1999. On May 7, 2001, Harron converted 870 and 106.7 to news/talk as WMTW. The WLAM call letters were then returned to 1470, which initially retained the standards format; on November 26, the station was switched to a simulcast of WMTW. Shortly afterwards, talk programming was removed from the stations in favor of an all-news format, mainly from the Associated Press's All-News Radio service.

After Harron sold its Maine radio stations to Nassau Broadcasting Partners in 2004, Newsradio WMTW was discontinued that April. Nassau introduced three separate formats to the stations, with WMTW switching to progressive talk from Air America Radio under the call letters WLVP. Nassau first attempted to drop progressive talk for ESPN Radio in September 2004; this sparked listener protest, prompting Nassau to initially postpone the format change to November 8 before canceling it entirely. However, after significant changes occurred at Air America (including the departure of Al Franken), WLVP began airing ESPN Radio on June 1, 2007.

WLVP and WLAM dropped ESPN Radio on February 2, 2009, and switched to oldies. In conjunction with the change, the stations began to simulcast WCSH's morning and early evening newscasts, a move made to continue the newscasts' availability via radio even after WCSH's own 87.7 MHz audio was discontinued following the shutdown of analog television signals.

Initially locally programmed, in early 2010 WLVP and WLAM became affiliates of The True Oldies Channel. Additionally, on August 2, the station added The Jeff Santos Show from WWZN in Boston (marking a partial return to progressive talk programming). The stations' format was modified once more on August 6, 2011, when sports talk was readded to the weekend schedule via locally-produced shows from the Maine Sports Network (which previously provided some weekend programming to WJJB-FM).

WLVP, along with 16 other Nassau stations in northern New England, was purchased at bankruptcy auction by WBIN Media Company, a company controlled by Bill Binnie, on May 22, 2012. Binnie already owned WBIN-TV in Derry, New Hampshire. The deal was completed on November 30, 2012. In June 2014, WLVP and WLAM switched to Cumulus Media's Good Time Oldies service after Cumulus ended distribution of The True Oldies Channel.

On December 9, 2015, Binnie agreed to sell WLAM and WLVP to Blue Jey Broadcasting Company, controlled by Bob Bittner, for $135,000; the deal made WLVP a sister station to WJTO in Bath. The sale to Blue Jey Broadcasting was consummated on February 17, 2016. Upon takeover of WLVP and WLAM, the stations' format evolved to a playlist similar to (but separate from) WJTO, and the simulcast of WCSH news programming was discontinued. By 2021, WLVP and WLAM had become separately programmed and automated from their transmitter sites, though continuing to feature a similar playlist of soft adult contemporary and standards to Bittner's flagship network of WJTO, WJIB in Cambridge, Massachusetts, and WBAS on Cape Cod.

Owner Bob Bittner died in May 2023. WLVP went silent in October 2024; its suspension of operations came several months before operator Bob Perry announced a subsequently-postponed April 2025 closure of sister stations WJTO and WLAM. Attempts to bring the station back on the air ended in April 2025 due to circuitry issues, and in May 2026 due to problems with the transmitter power supply. The Federal Communications Commission cancelled the station's license on September 28, 2026.

== Translator ==
Broadcast translator for WLVP
Call sign	Frequency	City of license	FID	ERP (W)	Class	Transmitter coordinates	FCC info
W286DR	105.1 FM	Gorham, Maine	202494	250	D	43°39′49.3″N 70°29′39.2″W	LMS
