= WCLZ =

Radio station in North Yarmouth, Maine

Coordinates: 43.928°N 69.994°W

- North Yarmouth, Maine; United States
- Broadcast area: Portland metropolitan area
- Frequency: 98.9 MHz (HD Radio)
- Branding: 98.9 WCLZ

Programming
- Format: Adult album alternative
- Affiliations: United Stations Radio Networks

Ownership
- Owner: Saga Communications; (Saga Communications of New England, LLC)
- Sister stations: WMGX; WYNZ; WPOR; WVAE; WBAE; WGAN

History
- First air date: April 11, 1965 (as WCME-FM)
- Former call signs: WCME-FM (1965–1973); WKXA-FM (1973–1984); WCLZ (1984–1988); WCLZ-FM (1988–1999); WTPN (1999–2001)

Technical information
- Licensing authority: FCC
- Facility ID: 56569
- Class: B
- ERP: 48,000 watts
- HAAT: 122 meters (400 ft)

Links
- Public license information: Public file; LMS
- Webcast: Listen live
- Website: www.989wclz.com

WCLZ (98.9 FM) is a radio station licensed to North Yarmouth, Maine, United States, and serving the Portland metropolitan area. Owned by Saga Communications, the station broadcasts an adult album alternative format.

== History ==
The 98.9 frequency debuted on April 11, 1965, as WCME-FM in Brunswick, Maine, about 30 miles (48 km) north of Portland. The station began as a simulcast of WCME (900 AM). The stations played middle of the road (music) and aired local information. The WCME-AM-FM call sign eventually became WKXA-AM-FM. By 1980, WKXA-FM was a full-time country music station with an 80,000 watt signal which was easily heard in Portland and was giving established country station WPOR (1490 AM, now WBAE, and 101.9 FM) some competition. The WCLZ call letters were installed on 98.9 in 1984, when the station picked up an adult contemporary format. Several years later, the station adopted the adult album alternative (AAA) format for which it is known today.

The WCLZ call letters remained on 98.9 until 1999, when the station was sold from Fuller-Jeffrey Broadcasting to Citadel Communications. Following the sale, the WCLZ call letters and format moved to 95.5 (now WPPI), and 98.9 became WTPN "98.9 The Point", with a modern hot adult contemporary format. The call letters and format of WCLZ returned to the frequency in 2001, after 95.5 became WJJB-FM and began simulcasting sports programming from WJAE (1440 AM, now WRED) and WJJB (900 AM, the former and present WCME).

WCLZ was sold to Saga Communications in 2007 after the FCC required Citadel to sell two Portland stations due to the company's acquisition of ABC Radio. The other station sold was WCYI (93.9 FM, now WARX) in Lewiston, Maine, which for a time simulcast WCLZ, when held in The Last Bastion Station Trust, LLC, the trust Citadel set up to sell the two Portland stations, as well as several other stations across the United States in order to get under the market cap (WCYI would be separately sold to the Educational Media Foundation). Several of WCLZ's shows moved to WBLM and other Citadel owned stations before the transfer into the trust.
