= Operation Gyroscope =

1950s US Army program to reorganize troop rotation in Europe

Operation Gyroscope was a US Army program implemented between 1955 and 1959. This Cold War initiative modified the system of troop rotation, adjusting how divisions versus individuals rotated in and out of combat zones. The program also applied to smaller non-divisional units and was used primary to exchange units between the United States and Germany under United States Army Europe. It aimed to increase retention rates by boosting morale and unit cohesion, with the added incentive of improving military family stability by keeping soldiers together for most of their careers. Although the program initially increased morale, the Army was unable to keep its promises to the soldiers, and the expected benefits failed to materialize, resulting in the early termination of the program after just one of the planned three-year rotation cycles had been completed.

== Background ==
=== Retention problems ===
Following the end of the Korean War, the United States Army faced significant retention challenges. It was failing to retain experienced enlisted soldiers in service due to the unpopularity of the army compared to civilian careers. Manpower requirements could be filled by the draftees of the Selective Service System, but they had only a two-year service obligation and little incentive to remain in the army. Even voluntary enlistees did not re-enlist in sufficient numbers to meet demand. The issues of retention especially affected specialized branches that required advanced training, such as radar technicians, aircraft mechanics, and signal troops.

Retention problems further increased instability and inefficiency within the army. Every year, vast quantities of replacements needed to be trained and sent to their permanent duty stations in order to compensate for the equally vast numbers of those returning for discharge. As a result of the manpower shortage, in 1954, a career soldier might have only had six months stateside between foreign tours, and there were units with 70% personnel turnover. The situation was exemplified by the 25th Infantry Division in Hawaii, where in 1954 and 1955 it was short by at least 1,000 personnel. The division had 4,000 soldiers nominally on the rolls, who were in fact either transferring into or out of the unit, in addition to having only 108 out of 882 authorized officers. Such turbulence made it difficult to train and, as a result, the commander described the situation as essentially "garrison duty." High personnel turnover was inherent in the individual replacement system used by the army, leading to a complete change in unit personnel over three years. The individual replacement system thus required the Army to maintain excess manpower to compensate both for soldiers in transit between stations and low retention rates.

In an attempt to solve the retention problem, senior army officers sought to replace the individual replacement system with one based on unit rotation. Before World War II, soldiers would spend their entire careers in the same unit, creating a "surrogate family" that generated strong esprit de corps and motivated them to remain in the service. However, the need for manpower during wartime forced a move to a system of individual training and replacement, which proved effective at meeting wartime manpower requirements, but was detrimental to peacetime needs.

By the end of the Korean War, the system was criticized in the army as damaging to morale, unit cohesion, and combat effectiveness, with one report to Army Chief of Staff General Matthew Ridgway declaring that the replacement system reduced "the individual soldier to the same status as a piece of equipment which is moved from place to place according to his MOS whenever a blank file exists." The report blamed the system for reducing discipline in combat, which it argued was the cause of the perceived unsatisfactory conduct and even defection of some American prisoners of war in Korea. Furthermore, polls of officers and enlisted men leaving the army reinforced the conclusions of Chief of Army Field Forces Lieutenant General John E. Dahlquist that "instability of assignments" and too frequent overseas deployments were barriers to retention. Since 1941, career soldiers and military families had lived a transitory existence unable to reconcile long-term plans with the army, "never secure enough to buy a house, plan their children's education, or put down roots in the community."

=== Development and proposed benefits ===
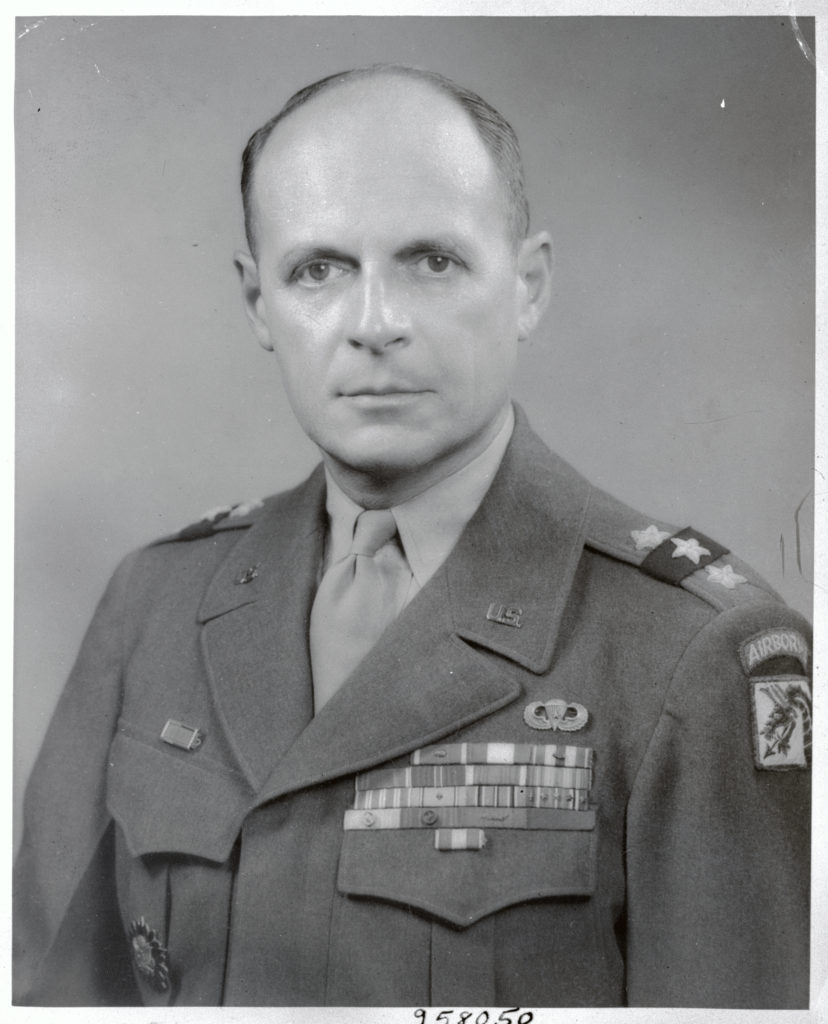
Army Chief of Staff Matthew Ridgway was a strong proponent of the plan

Matthew Ridgway, the then Army Chief of Staff, was a strong believer in the importance of esprit de corps and the prewar traditional regimental culture, and thus opposed the individual replacement system. Through a unit rotation system, he argued, career soldiers could make long-term plans, have relative stability, and would have greater incentives for self-improvement if promotion did not entail leaving their comrades; most importantly in his opinion, the system would keep morale high. Unit rotation benefits received general support. The end of the Korean War in 1953 provided the Army an opportunity to adjust the replacement system. Between 1953 and 1955, United States Army Europe (USAREUR) implemented a promising system of unit rotation on a small scale in which tank and infantry platoons were sent to Europe intact. Meanwhile, the army staff began developing the Gyroscope program of unit replacement in response to Ridgway, Dahlquist, and army staff Deputy Chief of Staff for Personnel (G-1) Major General Robert N. Young, who agreed that a unit-based replacement system would have economic, unit cohesion, and efficiency benefits.

Planners intended that under Gyroscope, an individual soldier would be with the same unit for most of his career and spend an equal amount of time stationed in CONUS and overseas, and would be able to move stations together with his family to avoid long separations that damaged troop morale. Such stability was anticipated to lead to increased unit cohesion and thus higher retention rates, decreasing the costs of training caused by the frequent personnel turnover and improving efficiency. Planners anticipated that the morale benefits of Gyroscope would improve American public perception of military service. The program objectives of improved morale, increased combat effectiveness, and reduced costs were planned to be achieved through the pairing of divisions stationed in the Continental United States (CONUS) with overseas divisions, who would exchange places every three years, and the transfer of basic and advanced individual training responsibilities to CONUS units. The latter change reduced the number of training units and thus excess personnel needed, allowing for the phasing out of training divisions and their replacement by branch replacement centers. In response to wartime requirements, it made it possible for an entire division to be replaced in the event of its destruction by nuclear attack. Most vehicles and heavy weapons were slated to be kept at permanent bases with Gyroscope units using their predecessor's materiel. Although planners envisaged divisions and regiments rotating among Germany, Asia, and the United States over nine-year cycles, in practice Gyroscope was limited almost exclusively to exchanges between USAREUR and CONUS.

== Implementation ==
Divisional rotations under Operation Gyroscope
| Year | CONUS division (station) | OCONUS division (station) |
|---|---|---|
| 1955 | 10th Infantry (Ft. Riley) | 1st Infantry (Germany) |
| 1956 | 11th Airborne (Ft. Campbell) | 5th Infantry (Germany) |
| 1956 | 3rd Armored (Ft. Knox) | 4th Infantry (Germany) |
| 1956 | 2nd Infantry (Ft. Lewis) | 71st Infantry (Alaska) |
| 1956 | 8th Infantry (Ft. Carson) | 9th Infantry (Germany) |
| 1958 | 4th Armored (Ft. Hood) | 2nd Armored (Germany) |
| 1958 | 3rd Infantry (Ft. Benning) | 10th Infantry (Germany) |

In Little Gyroscope, the 216th Field Artillery Battalion and 156 wives and children were transported to Germany aboard the USS Patch in March 1955 to test the program. This was considered a success by the army, with the personnel and dependents in place at Darmstadt within a day of docking at Bremerhaven and boarding waiting trains, having been provided extensive assistance in settling in by sponsors from the 760th Field Artillery Battalion. After almost a year of preparation, the first Gyroscope swap, designated GYROSCOPE I, was made on 1 July 1955 with the rotation of the 1st Infantry Division, which had been in Germany with United States Army Europe (USAREUR) since World War II ended, and its replacement by the 10th Infantry Division from Fort Riley, Kansas. Also included in GYROSCOPE I were the exchanges of the non-divisional 2nd Armored Cavalry Regiment from Germany and the 3rd Cavalry Regiment from Fort Meade, and the 508th Airborne Infantry Regimental Combat Team (RCT) from Fort Campbell and 187th Airborne Infantry RCT from Japan.

Initial reports boded well for the future of the program, with one division commander reporting that career soldiers were volunteering on their own initiative for the previously unpopular duty of recruit training and also "writing detailed instructions to help the incoming unit." Another officer found that the system cultivated a "sense of belonging" within soldiers as they now remained with the same unit throughout service. Gyroscope units were not only re-equipped but also selected for higher personnel quality. 11th Airborne Division officer Robert Elton attested to such gains, with the discharge of "malcontents, misfits, and criminals" and their replacement with motivated trainees whom training instructors worked hard to prepare, "knowing that they might lead these same soldiers in combat." Elton observed that by the time the 11th Airborne Division returned to the Continental United States, officers and soldiers possessed the proficiency and readiness he described in his writings, noting: "they could all do everything...and they could maintain these things because they have done it, and done it, and done it."

In order to meet army requirements, the program was modified so that when the 11th Airborne Division rotated into Germany from Fort Campbell, its replacement 5th Infantry Division went to Fort Ord instead so that Fort Campbell could be used for the experimental Reorganization of The Airborne Division (Pentomic airborne) division. The program was used outside of Europe, with the 2nd Infantry Division sent to Alaska in 1956 to replace the 71st Infantry Division, which was reflagged as the 4th Infantry Division. Although not initially envisaged under Gyroscope, the rotation of non-divisional combat support units such as field artillery, signals, engineering and transportation battalions and even companies was implemented in 1956. USAREUR assessed in its 1957 report on Gyroscope that the rotation of battalions and companies was much less difficult since the strain on logistics increased proportionately with unit size.

== Demise ==
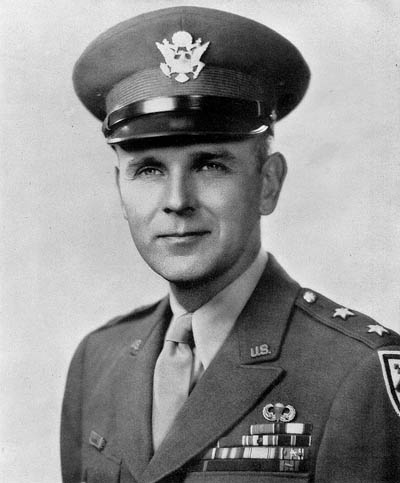
Maxwell Taylor's policies as chief of staff contributed to the demise of Gyroscope

Despite the initial popularity of Gyroscope among soldiers, it could not survive the effects of the New Look army personnel reductions and lack of long-term support from the United States Department of the Army. Although forces in Europe lost only 28,000, the army was reduced by 210,000 between 1955 and 1958. CONUS forces were further stretched by the creation of the Strategic Army Corps by General Maxwell D. Taylor, who replaced Ridgway as army chief of staff in mid-1955. This committed the army to maintaining an additional four combat-ready CONUS divisions for overseas rapid response commitments. By 1958, there were not enough stateside counterparts available for rotations with the divisions in Germany. The problem was compounded by Taylor's simultaneous Pentomic reorganization, which resulted in smaller divisions with different logistical requirements being sent overseas. The Pentomic reorganization broke up regiments in order to optimize the army for nuclear war, contradicting Gyroscope goals of building unit cohesion and tradition. With contrasting imperatives and budget constraints, the Army leadership was forced to choose between a system that served its bureaucratic and organizational needs and one that theoretically benefited the individual soldier. Further contributing to the end of the program were optimistic assessments that supported the belief that morale and retention had improved enough that the army could be draft only the best out of each draft class. Such assessments relied on selective interpretation of data, exemplified by Taylor's claim in a 1956 speech that retention had jumped from 17 to nearly 60 percent, even though in this figure he counted those who enlisted to pursue reserve rather than active duty careers.

In addition to the effects of organizational changes, Gyroscope ultimately failed to deliver on its promised benefits. The three-year deployment system conflicted with the two-year Selective Service obligation, forcing the army into a mixed rotation system in which draftees did not train with the unit to which they were assigned. The program failed to change behavioral issues in the army, with no effect on court-martial incidents during the program and continuing incidents that aroused negative publicity among the German press. The army broke its promises to career soldiers, with family housing at Fort Riley found to be cramped and deteriorating by the 1st Infantry Division. Meanwhile, 10th Infantry Division's married soldiers found out on short notice that a lack of dependent housing in Germany meant that they would have to either transfer or leave their families behind stateside. Army requirements quickly forced a rethinking of promises to keep Gyroscope units at permanent stations, with the 10th Infantry Division told that they would not be coming back to Fort Riley after returning from Germany in three years. Instead of preserving unit integrity, staff officers both stateside and in Germany reassigned the troops of rotating divisions to other units; an officer of the 4th Infantry Division recalled that by the time it reached its stateside station of Fort Lewis the division had been "completely wrecked and left with nothing" by this practice.

Senior officers ultimately perceived Gyroscope as wasteful and expensive. Barksdale Hamlett, who commanded the 10th Infantry Division in Germany, concluded that regardless of the program benefits to overseas divisions, it "ruined [CONUS units]: we just didn't have anything left over here." Melvin Zais, who served both stateside and in Germany during Gyroscope, described the situation as "a mess" in which the enlisted requisitioning system "went to hell, and the replacement system was inefficient and couldn't respond," while the officer replacement system was similarly affected. William Westmoreland, then Secretary of the General Staff, opposed unit rotation as disruptive to orderly career soldier progression.

The last divisional exchange was in 1958 when the 3rd Infantry Division replaced the 10th Infantry Division in Germany, and after a short-lived effort to rotate battalions and battle groups the program was terminated on 1 September 1959 on the recommendation of United States Army Europe commander General Clyde D. Eddleman, who argued that other replacement systems were superior and involved less disruption; the army returned to the previous individual replacement system.
