= WGAN =

Radio station in Portland, Maine

- Portland, Maine; United States
- Broadcast area: Portland metropolitan area
- Frequency: 550 kHz
- Branding: Newsradio WGAN

Programming
- Format: Talk radio
- Network: ABC News Radio
- Affiliations: Compass Media Networks; Premiere Networks; Salem Radio Network; Westwood One

Ownership
- Owner: Saga Communications; (Saga Communications of New England, LLC)
- Sister stations: WBAE; WCLZ; WMGX; WPOR; WYNZ

History
- First air date: August 3, 1938
- Call sign meaning: Guy Gannett Publishing Company (previous owner)

Technical information
- Licensing authority: FCC
- Facility ID: 58544
- Class: B
- Power: 5,000 watts
- Transmitter coordinates: 43°41′24.29″N 70°19′3.18″W
- Translator: 98.5 W253DA (Portland)
- Repeater: 93.1 WMGX-HD2 (Portland)

Links
- Public license information: Public file; LMS
- Webcast: Listen live
- Website: wgan.com

WGAN (560 AM) is a commercial radio station licensed to Portland, Maine, United States, featuring a talk format. Owned by Saga Communications, this station serves the Portland metropolitan area. The studios and offices are on Western Avenue in South Portland, Maine, while the transmitter is in Portland. In addition to a standard analog transmission, WGAN is heard on low-power translator W253DA (98.5 FM), is relayed over the second HD Radio of WMGX, and is available online. WGAN is also Maine's primary entry point station for the Emergency Alert System.

== History ==
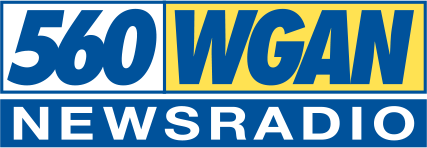
WGAN's logo from July 2002 until May 27, 2014

WGAN went on the air August 3, 1938. It was founded by the Portland Broadcasting System, a subsidiary of Guy Gannett Publishing, owner of the Portland Press Herald daily newspaper. WGAN was Portland's second radio station after WCSH (later co-owned WZAN) which signed on in 1925. WGAN had its studios in the Columbia Hotel and originally broadcast on 640 kHz at 500 watts. It was a daytimer, required to go off the air at sunset in Los Angeles, because it shared AM 640 with Class I-A station KFI, the dominant clear channel station.

WGAN was an affiliate of the Columbia Broadcasting System (CBS), carrying the CBS Radio Network schedule of dramas, comedies, news, sports, soap operas, game shows and big band broadcasts during the "Golden Age of Radio". After the enactment of the North American Regional Broadcasting Agreement (NARBA) in 1941, WGAN moved to 560 kHz. It got a power boost to 5,000 watts and could broadcast around the clock.

In 1954, WGAN gained a companion television station, WGAN-TV (channel 13), and in 1967, a co-owned FM station, WGAN-FM 102.9 (now WBLM). When network programming moved from radio to television, WGAN began airing a full service, middle of the road format of popular music, news and sports.

Until the early 1980s, Gannett's Portland operations owned the major daily newspaper, the CBS television station, WGAN-FM and WGAN, two of the city's top radio stations. Channel 13 was later renamed WGME-TV when WGAN-AM-FM were sold to Taylor Communications in 1983. In 1987, WGAN was sold by Taylor to Saga Communications. Saga increased the talk programming and decreased the music shows, eventually evolving WGAN to a full time talk format.

On May 27, 2014, WGAN began simulcasting on FM translator W288CU 105.5 FM, via sister station WMGX's HD2 subchannel. On August 22, 2019, WGAN also began simulcasting on FM translator W253DA 98.5 FM, but antenna issues forced that facility off the air after one week and delayed plans to launch a new format on the 105.5 translator. The move was completed that November, allowing the 105.5 translator to switch to an oldies format.

In March 2020, morning co-host Ken Altshuler was fired, followed in April with weekend morning host John McDonald's termination. Altshuler had been with WGAN for 18 years, and McDonald for 25.

== Programming ==
Matthew Gagnon hosts WGAN's local morning show, while syndicated hosts make up the balance of the schedule.

== Translator ==
Broadcast translator for WGAN
| Call sign | Frequency | City of license | FID | ERP (W) | Class | Transmitter coordinates | FCC info |
|---|---|---|---|---|---|---|---|
| W253DA | 98.5 FM | Portland, Maine | 201994 | 250 | D | 43°41′26.3″N 70°19′3.2″W | LMS |
