= WBAE =

Radio station in Portland, Maine

WBAE and WVAE

WBAE: Portland, Maine; WVAE: Biddeford, Maine; United States
- Broadcast area: WBAE: Portland metropolitan area; WVAE: York County, Maine
- Frequencies: WBAE: 1490 kHz; WVAE: 1400 kHz
- Branding: The Bay 107.1/93.5

Programming
- Format: Soft adult contemporary

Ownership
- Owner: Saga Communications; (Saga Communications of New England, LLC)
- Sister stations: WCLZ; WGAN; WMGX; WPOR; WYNZ

History
- First air date: WBAE: March 1946 (as WMTW); WVAE: 1949 (as WIDE)
- Former call signs: WBAE: WMTW (1946–1951); WPOR (1951–1999); WVAE: WIDE (1949–2003); WVAE (2003–2013); WGIN (2013–2018)
- Call sign meaning: WBAE: Sounds like "bay" (station branding); WVAE: Disambiguation of WBAE

Technical information
- Licensing authority: FCC
- Facility ID: WBAE: 49983; WVAE: 73088
- Class: WBAE: C; WVAE: C
- Power: WBAE: 1,000 watts; WVAE: 1,000 watts
- Transmitter coordinates: WBAE: 43°39′48.29″N 70°16′15.18″W; WVAE: 43°28′54.3″N 70°29′9.19″W
- Translator(s): WBAE: 107.1 W296CZ (Portland); WVAE: 93.5 W228EE (Biddeford)

Links
- Public license information: WBAE: Public file; LMS; WVAE: Public file; LMS
- Webcast: Listen live
- Website: bayfavorites.com

WBAE (1490 kHz, "The Bay 107.1/93.5") is a commercial AM radio station in Portland, Maine, United States. Owned by Saga Communications, it broadcasts a soft adult contemporary format. Its studios and offices are located on Western Avenue in South Portland, and its transmitter is off Forest Avenue in Portland. The Bay primarily features music from soft rock artists and music of the 1970s and 80s, with a few newer titles mixed in.

WBAE can also be heard in the Portland area on its FM translator, W296CZ (107.1 MHz). The station is simulcast in York County, Maine on WVAE (1400 AM) in Biddeford, Maine, which has its own FM translator, W228EE (93.5 MHz); the station's current branding is derived from these FM feeds.

== History ==
WBAE was first licensed in 1946 as WMTW, broadcasting on 1490 kHz and licensed to The Yankee Network, Inc. The WMTW call sign was transferred from the original WMTW, an FM station which changed its call letters to WMNE at this time.

On August 1, 1951, WMTW changed call letters to WPOR. For much of its history, it was associated with country music, and when sister station WPOR-FM debuted in October 1967, the two stations were the primary source of country music in the Portland radio market. The AM and FM stations were mostly simulcast, although for a time, WPOR aired a satellite-delivered syndicated country music format while WPOR-FM featured local announcers and locally programmed country music.

In 1999, WPOR switched its call letters to WBAE. Its original format was adult standards, initially provided by the Music of Your Life network, and later Dial Global's Adult Standards (America's Best Music) service. WBAE was later simulcast with WVAE in Biddeford to give listeners in York County, Maine a better signal. WBAE and WVAE had an affiliation with ABC News Radio, and were the local outlets for Paul Harvey, Portland Pirates and the Portland Sea Dogs. (The Sea Dogs have moved to WPEI and WPPI; Paul Harvey died in 2009, and the Pirates have since moved to WLOB).

The stations adopted a hot talk format, dropping adult standards on March 4, 2009. Hot talk had been heard on co-owned WZAN before that station shifted to a political talk format. Hot talk later was replaced with an advice-oriented talk format on January 18, 2010.

The advice-talk programming included the syndicated morning show Bob and Tom from Indianapolis, syndicated family finance shows from Clark Howard and Dave Ramsey, psychological advice from The Dr. Laura Program and Dr. Joy Browne, as well as Loveline, NASCAR racing from the Motor Racing Network, and NFL football from Westwood One.

On September 15, 2009, it was announced that WBAE and WVAE would begin to broadcast the Boston Bruins. On January 16, 2012, it was announced that WBAE and WVAE would begin to broadcast the New York Yankees.

In February 2013, WVAE split from its simulcast with WBAE, and began simulcasting the news-talk programming of co-owned WGAN, to help WGAN better cover York County. WVAE took on the call letters WGIN to echo its originating station.

After four years under the talk format, WBAE flipped back to an Adult Standards format under its original 1490 The Bay branding on October 21, 2013, utilizing programming from Westwood One’s Adult Standards network, "America's Best Music." Dave Ramsey and Clark Howard moved to WZAN. Dr. Joy Browne was heard on WTSN in nearby Dover, New Hampshire (Browne died in 2016). Artists heard on WBAE included The Beatles, The Carpenters, Frank Sinatra and Dionne Warwick.

On December 16, 2015, WBAE began simulcasting WZAN's talk format. WZAN's talk programming moved exclusively to WBAE on January 1, 2016, with WZAN becoming a sports radio station carrying ESPN Radio programming. In May 2016, WBAE began simulcasting on FM translator 107.1 W296CZ.

On May 7, 2018, WBAE and WVAE flipped to soft adult contemporary, once again under the branding The Bay. WVAE is simulcast on a second FM translator in Biddeford, W228EE (93.5), which concurrently launched with the flip.

== Translators ==
Call sign	Frequency	City of license	FID	ERP (W)	Class	Transmitter coordinates	FCC info	Notes
W296CZ	107.1 FM	Portland, Maine	145635	250	D	43°41′17.3″N 70°15′25.2″W	LMS	Relays WBAE
W228EE	93.5 FM	Biddeford, Maine	200011	250	D	43°32′38.3″N 70°24′14.2″W	LMS	Relays WVAE
