= WPOR =

Radio station in Portland, Maine

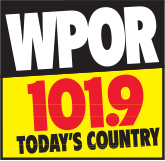
- Portland, Maine; United States
- Broadcast area: Greater Portland
- Frequency: 101.9 MHz
- Branding: 101.9 POR

Programming
- Format: Country
- Affiliations: Westwood One

Ownership
- Owner: Saga Communications; (Saga Communications of New England, LLC)
- Sister stations: WBAE; WCLZ; WGAN; WVAE; WMGX; WYNZ

History
- First air date: October 31, 1967
- Former call signs: WPOR-FM (1967–2002)
- Call sign meaning: Portland

Technical information
- Licensing authority: FCC
- Facility ID: 49982
- Class: B
- ERP: 32,000 watts
- HAAT: 186 meters (610 ft)
- Transmitter coordinates: 43.759°N 70.320°W

Links
- Public license information: Public file; LMS
- Webcast: Listen live
- Website: www.wpor.com

WPOR (101.9 FM) is a radio station in Portland, Maine, United States, that broadcasts a country music radio format. It is owned by Saga Communications.

== History ==
WPOR has had the same format since it signed on as an FM simulcast of WPOR (1490 AM) on October 31, 1967. WPOR was owned by Hildreth Broadcasting Corporation at that time. On March 2, 1971, WPOR and WPOR-FM were sold to Ocean Coast Properties. In March 1996, WPOR and WPOR-FM were sold again, this time to current owner Saga Communications for $10 million.

Through most of its history, the AM and the FM stations either simulcast, or for some years, the AM station used a satellite-delivered country music service, while live local announcers continued on the FM station. In March 1999, 1490 AM changed its call letters to WBAE. The reason for the new call letters was made clear on May 24, 1999, when WBAE changed its format to adult standards and became known on air as The Bay.

WPOR's Jon Shannon has hosted the POR Morning Crew since March 2001.

WPOR-FM had the greatest market share of any Maine radio station into the early 2000s. For many years, WPOR-FM and album-oriented rock station 102.9 WBLM were consistently Portland's top two stations, with each vying for the lead in the ratings. The situation changed with the debut of WTHT in Portland, another country station.
