= WMTW (TV) =

Television station in Poland Spring, Maine

- Poland Spring–Portland–Lewiston, Maine; United States
- City: Poland Spring, Maine
- Channels: Digital: 8 (VHF); Virtual: 8
- Branding: Channel 8 WMTW; WMTW News 8

Programming
- Affiliations: 8.1: ABC; for others, see § Subchannels

Ownership
- Owner: Hearst Television; (Hearst Properties Inc.)
- Sister stations: WPXT

History
- First air date: September 25, 1954
- Former call signs: WMTW-TV (1958–2007)
- Former channel numbers: Analog: 8 (VHF, 1954–2009); Digital: 46 (UHF, 2002–2009)
- Former affiliations: DuMont (secondary, 1954–1955)
- Call sign meaning: Mount Washington (site of station's original transmitter)

Technical information
- Licensing authority: FCC
- Facility ID: 73288
- ERP: 29.8 kW
- HAAT: 612 m (2,008 ft)
- Transmitter coordinates: 43°50′44″N 70°45′41″W
- Translator(s): 26 (UHF) Portland

Links
- Public license information: Public file; LMS
- Website: www.wmtw.com

WMTW (channel 8) is a television station licensed to Poland Spring, Maine, United States, serving the Portland area as an affiliate of ABC. It is owned by Hearst Television alongside CW affiliate WPXT (channel 51). The two stations share studios on Ledgeview Drive in Westbrook; WMTW's transmitter is located in West Baldwin, Maine.

WMTW also operates a low-power digital fill-in translator on UHF channel 26 (also mapped to virtual channel 8) from the Time and Temperature Building in downtown Portland's Monument Square. The translator serves the immediate part of Portland and some surrounding areas to serve viewers that have difficulty receiving the main signal.

In addition to WPXT, WMTW shares common coverage areas with four other Hearst-owned sister stations in New England: fellow ABC affiliates WCVB-TV in Boston and WMUR-TV in Manchester, New Hampshire; and its duopoly of NBC affiliate WPTZ and CW affiliate WNNE in Vermont.

== History ==
WMTW signed on September 25, 1954, as the third television station in the Portland market and under the ownership of Mount Washington Television, a group that included former Maine Governor Horace Hildreth. It has always been an ABC affiliate although it aired some DuMont programming in its first year. The station's sign-on made Portland one of the smallest markets in the United States with three network affiliates on the analog VHF band. WMTW is also the longest-tenured primary ABC affiliate in New England. The WMTW call sign was modified to include a "-TV" suffix on September 1, 1958.

The station originally broadcast from a transmitter on Mount Washington in New Hampshire, the highest peak in the northeastern United States. This gave WMTW one of the largest coverage areas of any station east of the Mississippi River. In addition to its main coverage area of Southern Maine and Northern New Hampshire, it could also be seen in parts of New York State, Massachusetts, and Vermont. The station also had significant viewership across the Canada–United States border in Montreal, a city with almost five times the population of WMTW's American coverage area. As a result, viewers in Vermont, northeastern New York State, and southern Quebec were able to watch the full ABC schedule on WMTW. The Burlington, Vermont–Plattsburgh, New York, market got its own ABC affiliate when WVNY (channel 22) signed on from Burlington in 1968. However, for some time afterward, WMTW-TV continued to have a large audience in that area (despite being difficult to receive over-the-air due to co-channel interference from Ottawa station CJOH-TV's repeater in Cornwall, Ontario). WMTW stayed on most Montreal cable systems until the early 1990s. Studios for the station were originally based in the Riccar Inn in Poland, now known as the Presidential Inn.

The station's transmitter tower on Mount Washington had been originally designed in 1940 by Major Edwin Armstrong for W1XER, one of the first FM radio stations in the country. WMTW-TV built a new tower there in the 1960s but Armstrong's tower remained as a standby.

Mount Washington Television sold the station to Dolphin Enterprises, Inc., a company whose chief officer was former Tonight Show host Jack Paar, in 1963. Initially barred from appearing on WMTW-TV due to contractual obligations with NBC, he later hosted several programs on the station including a Thursday night movie feature. In 1967, Paar sold WMTW to Mid New York Broadcasting which changed its name to Harron Communications a decade later.

WMTW-TV had to leave Mount Washington in 2002 due to the Federal Communications Commission (FCC)'s digital television mandate. The station had been allocated channel 45 for digital broadcasts, and Harron realized that it would not be possible to provide an acceptable signal to southern Maine if it built its digital transmitter on Mount Washington. As a result, channel 8 built a new tower in West Baldwin, a few miles from the towers of rival stations WGME-TV and WCSH, and signed off from Mount Washington for the last time on February 5, 2002. The new transmitter site does not serve as large an area as the Mount Washington tower had, but it provides a better signal to the highly populated areas.

Harron announced in December 2003 that it was exiting broadcasting and the station was sold to Hearst-Argyle Television a few months later. On October 9, 2007, WMTW dropped the "-TV" suffix.

Until 2009, WCVB-TV in Boston served as the flagship station of the New England Patriots Preseason Television Network, which allowed WMTW and WMUR-TV in Manchester, New Hampshire, to be part of the network. Even though WBZ-TV became the flagship station for the telecasts that year, WMTW and WMUR continue to simulcast games which results in ABC programming being preempted.

WMTW added The Local AccuWeather Channel on August 30, 2007, after launching digital subchannel 8.2. Branded as "News 8 Now", programming consisted of a loop of local weather forecast segments as well as regional and national coverage from AccuWeather. There was a live feed of the National Weather Service's Doppler weather radar (based at the Local Forecast Office in Gray) as well as local news and sports headlines. In addition, several public service announcements and station promotions were seen. As of March 2015, this service was replaced by Heroes & Icons, a classic TV network. In October 2018, following Hearst's purchase of WPXT, Heroes & Icons was moved to that station's second subchannel, with its previous MeTV programming, in turn, moving to the 8.2 subchannel; WMTW also added a third subchannel to add Laff, which moved from another WPXT subchannel.

In July 2012, during a retransmission consent dispute between Hearst Television and Time Warner Cable, Hallmark Movies & Mysteries was substituted for WMTW, WMUR-TV and WCVB-TV.

=== Sister radio stations ===
Several radio stations have been co-owned with WMTW. The first, WMTW-FM 94.9, was co-owned with the television station from the radio station's launch in 1958 until 1971. That station, which became WHOM in 1976 and is now owned by Townsquare Media, continues to transmit from Mount Washington. The other two, WMTW (870 AM) in Gorham and WMTW-FM 106.7 in North Windham, held those call signs from 2001 to 2004 (Harron had acquired the stations in 1999), serving first as news-talk stations and later as all-news stations; WMTW and WMTW-FM were also simulcast on WLAM (1470 AM) in Lewiston. The three stations, branded as "Newsradio WMTW", aired and produced local news and talk programs as well as simulcasts of WMTW-TV's newscasts and the now-defunct news radio service of the Associated Press.

The "Newsradio WMTW" stations were sold by Harron Communications to Nassau Broadcasting Partners in 2003. Soon after taking over, Nassau discontinued the format. The 870 frequency last operated as WLVP, simulcasting an oldies format with WLAM, while 106.7 FM is now WXTP, a Catholic radio station. An earlier FM station with the WMTW call sign (the descendant of W1XER) was not connected to WMTW-TV (having predated the station by several years) apart from also transmitting from Mount Washington.

== News operation ==
For most of its history, WMTW's newscasts ranked third in the ratings behind longtime dominant WCSH and runner-up WGME-TV. However, in more recent years, the station has waged a spirited battle with WGME for second place and has beaten WGME in several key sweeps periods.

In an attempt to take on WCSH and WGME in order to become more competitive, WMTW adapted its news department to appeal to change in viewer habits. It added a weekend morning show on January 2, 2010, offering an alternative to WCSH. Prior to this addition, the station only aired local weather cut-ins during the weekend edition of Good Morning America. WMTW starts its weekend morning news at 5 a.m., while WCSH begins its weekend morning news at 5 a.m. on Saturdays and 6 a.m. on Sundays; WGME has no local morning newscast on weekends except for during severe winter weather.

On September 18, 2012, WMTW upgraded local news production to 16:9 enhanced definition widescreen. On September 9, 2013, WMTW launched a 60-minute newscast weeknights at 5. To coincide with the news expansion, WMTW moved Dr. Phil from 5 p.m. to the 3 p.m. time slot replacing The Ricki Lake Show (which had been canceled). It also debuted a new logo (very similar to fellow ABC outlet WTNH channel 8 in New Haven, Connecticut) and introduced an updated corporate graphics package from Hearst Television.

Through an exclusive partnership with Charter Communications, WMTW operates a 24-hour cable news station throughout the market. This service replays local newscasts seen on the main broadcast channel in a continuous loop. It does not simulcast live shows that air on the main station; instead, the cable channel displays a slide directing viewers to the main station. "WMTW All News Channel" was originally on analog cable channel 9, but on May 5, 2009, it became available exclusively on the provider's digital tier.

On April 16, 2014, it was announced that WMTW would be moving its news operation from the Time and Temperature Building in Portland to a broadcast-ready facility in Westbrook. The studio space was formerly used by WPXT for its own in-house news operation that folded in the early-2000s. The rest of its operations would relocate from Auburn to Westbrook at a later date. WMTW began originating its newscasts from the renovated facility on October 4, 2014.

WMTW's broadcasts began being presented in full high-definition in 2016. Studio cameras and video pieces are all presented in high definition.

On August 8, 2016, WMTW announced that it would add a 4 p.m. weekday newscast which launched on September 6. On September 11, 2017, WMTW started airing a 12 p.m. newscast on weekdays; previously the time slot was occupied by talk shows including Access Hollywood Live, Steve Harvey and The Wendy Williams Show. Following Hearst's acquisition of WPXT on September 21, 2018, WMTW announced that it would begin producing a prime time newscast for that station on September 24.

On January 5, 2020, WMTW's weekday noon newscast expanded to one hour; it is the first regularly scheduled hour-long newscast in the time period in the Portland–Auburn television market.

== Technical information ==
=== Subchannels ===
The station's signal is multiplexed:

Subchannels of WMTW
Subchannel		Res.	Short name	Programming
WMTW	WMTW (DRT)	Res.	Short name	Programming
8.1	8.11	1080i	WMTW-HD	ABC
8.2	8.12	480i	MeTV	MeTV
8.3	8.13	480i	LAFF	Laff (4:3)
8.4	8.14	480i	HSN	HSN
8.5	8.15	480i	GetTV	Great
8.6	8.16	480i	MeToon	MeTV Toons (4:3)

WMTW's broadcasts became digital-only, effective June 12, 2009.

=== Translator ===
- WMTW (DRT) 26 Portland

In 2005, WMTW activated two analog repeaters. This included W26CQ channel 26 in Colebrook, New Hampshire (transmitter was northeast of town in Coleman State Park), and W27CP channel 27 in White River Junction, Vermont (transmitter was in the Mascoma section of Lebanon, New Hampshire), to make up for lost coverage when it signed off from Mount Washington. Under normal conditions, these translators should have been built before WMTW moved off the mountain in order to comply with FCC regulations. However, construction was delayed almost four years because the Canadian Radio-television and Telecommunications Commission (CRTC) had to agree to the proposed tower locations for the translators.

Colebrook is part of the Portland market but White River Junction is considered to be part of the Burlington–Plattsburgh market. The latter location was within the former coverage area of WNNE. Although that station's transmitter was located on Mount Ascutney (well south of White River Junction), it formerly operated a repeater of its own from Lebanon (transmitter was west of town on Crafts Hill). FCC regulations do not usually allow two or more stations from two or more different markets have coverage of the same location (in this case, White River Junction). This rule, however, does not apply to repeaters. Incidentally, White River Junction is within the fringe area of another Hearst sister station, WMUR-TV.

Both WMTW repeaters were sold to New Hampshire Public Television (NHPTV) in 2009. W27CP went silent on July 15 after losing the lease on its tower, while W26CQ was shut down by Hearst on September 2 in preparation for the sale. The latter transmitter returned as an NHPTV relay on November 4. W27CP never returned to the air and its broadcasting license was canceled by the FCC on September 14, 2011. More recently, WMTW obtained a construction permit for a translator in Portland on UHF channel 26. On April 26, 2010, the station filed a license to cover for the new translator which was granted by the FCC on June 1. This essentially allowed it to officially sign-on.
