= WCSH =

Television station in Portland, Maine

- Portland, Maine; United States
- Channels: Digital: 31 (UHF); Virtual: 6
- Branding: WCSH 6; News Center Maine

Programming
- Affiliations: 6.1: NBC; for others, see § Subchannels

Ownership
- Owner: Tegna Inc., a subsidiary of Nexstar Media Group; (TEGNA East Coast Broadcasting, LLC)
- Sister stations: WLBZ

History
- First air date: December 20, 1953
- Former call signs: WCSH-TV (1953–1997)
- Former channel numbers: Analog: 6 (VHF, 1953–2009); Digital: 44 (UHF, 2002–2020)
- Call sign meaning: "Congress Square Hotel"

Technical information
- Licensing authority: FCC
- Facility ID: 39664
- ERP: 1,000 kW
- HAAT: 587.9 m (1,929 ft)
- Transmitter coordinates: 43°51′30″N 70°42′39″W

Links
- Public license information: Public file; LMS
- Website: newscentermaine.com

WCSH (channel 6) is a television station in Portland, Maine, United States, affiliated with NBC and owned by the Tegna subsidiary of Nexstar Media Group. The station's studios are located on Congress Square in Downtown Portland, and its transmitter is located on Winn Mountain in Sebago. Together with WLBZ (channel 2) in Bangor, which simulcasts most of WCSH's local newscasts, it is known as News Center Maine.

WCSH is the oldest operating television station in Portland, signing on in December 1953. It was an outgrowth of WCSH radio, one of NBC's charter affiliates when it was constituted as a radio network in 1926, and broadcast from its namesake, the Congress Square Hotel in downtown Portland, for nearly 25 years. Founded by Henry P. Rines and sold to the Gannett Company in 1997, it has generally been the highest-rated station in TV news in the market since the mid-1980s.

== History ==
=== Establishment ===
When the Federal Communications Commission (FCC) lifted its four-year freeze on television station applications in April 1952, four bids had already been received to start new stations in Portland, which was allocated two commercial very high frequency (VHF) channels and a third on the new ultra high frequency (UHF) band. One of these came from the Congress Square Hotel Company, owner of Portland radio station WCSH (970 AM), which had filed for channel 11 in 1948 but amended its application when only VHF channels 6 and 13 were assigned. In October 1952, the FCC ordered comparative hearings to decide who should be given construction permits for channels 6 and 13. Two groups sought each channel; Congress Square's application was rivaled by one from the Oliver Broadcasting Company, which owned station WPOR.

The third VHF channel in southern Maine was channel 8 at Poland Spring, and activity around this channel would proceed to unblock channel 6 in Portland. The FCC granted a permit in early July 1953 to Mount Washington Television, a group headed by former Maine governor Horace A. Hildreth containing principals from Oliver as shareholders. Oliver withdrew its channel 6 application on July 30, 1953, and the FCC immediately awarded the Congress Square Hotel Company a permit for channel 6, WCSH-TV. This was the second construction permit for a Portland TV station, with WPMT (channel 53) already being built.

Because WCSH had conditionally purchased television equipment 18 months prior, it was assured delivery of its order to put channel 6 on the air by the end of 1953. WCSH-TV announced its intention to be Portland's NBC affiliate, matching WCSH radio—which had carried NBC's very first program when the radio network began in November 1926 and previously had been part of the WEAF chain that preceded it. The transmitting facility would be erected in Falmouth, while WCSH's quarters in the Congress Square Hotel were extensively refitted to house the television station: a large radio studio was converted for television use, and a new studio was created out of a former storage room to house a kitchen for cooking shows.

The first test pattern was sent out on November 29, and on December 20, 1953, WCSH-TV began broadcasting. The station's broadcasting activity steadily increased in its early years, with such local shows as the home decorating program Your Home and You; Youth Cavalcade; the noontime women's program Living Down East; The Dave Astor Show, a teen dance program; and early and late evening newscasts. By January 1955, it was broadcasting 18 hours a day and had become a secondary affiliate of the DuMont Television Network in its final years of operation after WPMT closed the month before. The Rines family, who had founded WCSH radio and television, also owned the Maine Broadcasting System with radio stations WRDO in Augusta and WLBZ in Bangor. It expanded its TV holdings north in 1958 when it bought WTWO, an independent station in Bangor owned by Murray Carpenter, and made it into an NBC affiliate as WLBZ-TV.

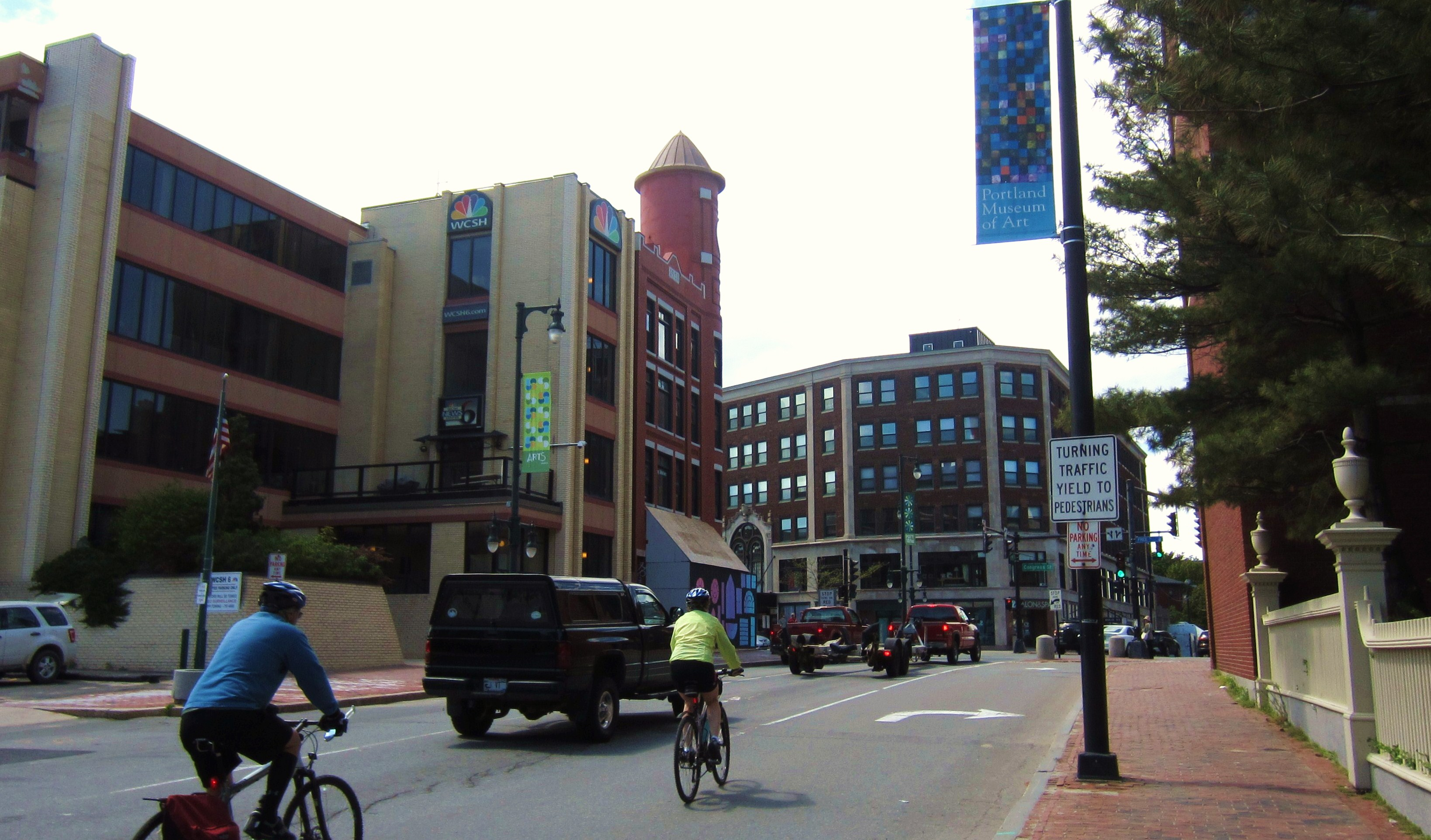
The WCSH studios at 1 Congress Square in downtown Portland

After 50 years of radio and television operations in the Congress Square Hotel, WCSH opted to move its broadcasting businesses into more modern quarters. The studio portion of the hotel complex had become overcrowded despite multiple additions. In 1977, WCSH moved one city block to occupy a four-story building at 1 Congress Square, which received a two-story addition containing studio space; WCSH radio moved to separate facilities in Scarborough. The Maine Broadcasting System continued to own the radio station until 1981, when it was sold and changed call letters; WLBZ radio in Bangor was also sold, while the television properties were retained. Particularly beginning in the 1980s, WCSH made its mark as the dominant station in Portland-market ratings, even if it sometimes irked NBC. The station was heavily protective of its 6 p.m. newscast, resulting in far more frequent preemptions of network sports events. In 1994, WCSH did not air 38 percent of NBC's 502 hours of sports programming that year—the most of any of NBC's 213 affiliates and more than double the preemption rate of WSMV-TV in Nashville, Tennessee—which the network begrudgingly tolerated because the station delivered strong performance for the network's daytime and prime time entertainment shows. Events as diverse as the second games of NBA doubleheaders and golf tournaments were not aired to provide a consistent airing of the 6 p.m. NewsCenter and to air movies which drew more viewers.

=== Gannett/Tegna ownership ===
We made the decision as a family in response to scary terms like 'high-definition television' and '500-channel universe'.

— Frederic L. Thompson, president of the Maine Broadcasting System, on the sale of WCSH and WLBZ

The Rines-Thompson family exited the local broadcasting industry after 72 years (44 of them owning WCSH television) by selling WCSH and WLBZ to the Gannett Company in 1997. It had negotiated exclusively with Gannett for several months after approaching several potential acquirers. The family had decided to sell because of deregulation in broadcasting and costly new technological mandates, such as the forthcoming conversion to digital television. The family earned a handsome return on its original investment in WCSH radio in 1925. The transaction also marked the entry of large station groups into Maine. For most of the broadcasting era, Maine had been traditionally dominated by locally based owners, including families.

WCSH's digital signal on UHF channel 44 signed on in April 2002, bringing high definition network television to the area. WCSH's broadcasts became digital-only, effective June 12, 2009; the station elected to continue broadcasting on channel 44 (using virtual channel 6), which it did until being repacked to channel 31 in 2020. As part of the SAFER Act, WCSH kept its analog signal on the air until June 27 to inform viewers of the digital television transition through a loop of public service announcements from the National Association of Broadcasters.

On June 29, 2015, the Gannett Company split in two, with one side specializing in print media and the other side specializing in broadcast and digital media. WCSH and WLBZ were retained by the latter company, named Tegna. The two stations adopted the brand News Center Maine in 2018 upon the rollout of a combined website for Portland and Bangor news coverage. Nexstar Media Group announced their purchase of Tegna on August 19, 2025; the deal was completed on March 19, 2026, but integration has been halted due to ongoing litigation.

== Local programming ==
=== News operation ===
Newscasts were part of WCSH's schedule from its first television broadcasts in 1953, and the station was airing early evening and late evening newscasts by 1955. While the station typically trailed WGAN-TV/WGME in the news ratings for most of its history, this changed in February 1986 when WCSH surpassed WGME at 11 p.m. and tied channel 13 in the vital 6 p.m. news slot. Later that year, the station would surpass WGME at 6 and proceed to do so for at least the next 16 years. This was aided by stability in its evening news team and NBC's strong national program lineup in the 1990s. On-air talent like anchors Pat Callaghan and Cindy Williams and meteorologist Joe Cupo were mainstays on channel 6 for years. Cupo left in 2016 after 37 years when Tegna offered voluntary retirement packages, while Williams retired in 2021 and Callaghan in 2022 after tenures of 32 and 43 years, respectively.

From the 1980s onward, WLBZ's local operations were progressively cut back, a trend that accelerated after Gannett took over. While WLBZ had already simulcast WCSH's morning and weekend newscasts since 1989, regional 5:30 and 11 p.m. newscasts were instituted in 2000 with split weather forecasts for each area, with WLBZ only airing separate 5 and 6 p.m. newscasts. WLBZ ceased producing separate local newscasts altogether on October 8, 2015; all newscasts on both stations now originate from Portland, though Bangor viewers continue to see separate weather forecasts. The presence of WLBZ in the News Center Maine operation has resulted in a newscast with a stronger statewide news focus than its competitors in the Portland market.

After The WB affiliate WPXT shut down its news department in fall 2002, WCSH and WLBZ entered into a news share agreement with that station, resulting in a nightly prime time newscast. The half-hour News Center at 10 moved to a digital subchannel of WCSH in 2008 when WPXT opted out of the arrangement, citing a lack of advertising support. In the early 2010s, WCSH tried its hand again at airing news for WPXT, with the addition of a 7 a.m. hour of WCSH's morning newscast branded as News Center Morning Report Xtra.

=== Non-news programming ===
From 2000 until the host's retirement in 2019, the News Center Maine stations aired human interest and outdoors program Bill Green's Maine; Green had gotten his start at WLBZ before moving to Portland and WCSH in 1981.

WCSH debuted 207, a weeknight lifestyle and entertainment magazine aired weeknights at 7 pm, in 2003. It was named for the state's area code, 207.

== Subchannels ==
WCSH's transmitter is located on Winn Mountain in Sebago. The station's signal is multiplexed:

Subchannels of WCSH
Subchannel	Res.	Short name	Programming
6.1	1080i	WCSH-HD	NBC
6.2	480i	Crime	True Crime Network
6.3	480i	Quest	Quest
6.4	480i	365 NET	365BLK
6.5	480i	OUTLAW	Outlaw
6.6	480i	ShopLC	Shop LC
6.7	480i	MEradar	Radar
6.8	480i	DEFY	Defy
