= 98.7 FM =

FM radio frequency

The following radio stations broadcast on FM frequency 98.7 MHz:

== Argentina ==
- Radio VIP in Río Ceballos, Córdoba. Emisora perteneciente a Grupo Multimedios Monti
- Cristal in Olavarría, Buenos Aires
- Cóndor in Villa de Merlo, San Luis
- Del Mar in Comodoro Rivadavia, Chubut
- Imperio in Río Cuarto, Córdoba
- Estación K2 in Necochea, Buenos Aires
- Las Rosas in Las Rosas, Santa Fe
- LaRock-a in San Carlos de Bariloche, Río Negro
- LIF in General Arenales, Buenos Aires
- Magica Miramar in Miramar, Buenos Aires
- Metro TDF in Río Grande, Tierra del Fuego
- Municipal in Patquia, La Rioja
- Nacional Folklórica in Buenos Aires
- Tango in Rosario, Santa Fe
- ToP! Radio in Camilo Aldao, Córdoba
- Universidad in Posadas, Misiones
- Universo in San Antonio de Arredondo, Córdoba
- VOX in Tres Arroyos, Buenos Aires
- Z98 Radio Laprida in Laprida, Buenos Aires

== Australia ==
- ABC Classic in Port Macquarie, New South Wales
- SBS Radio in Young, New South Wales
- 4RGM in Mackay, Queensland
- Ten FM in Stanthorpe, Queensland
- 5EZY in Renmark, South Australia
- 3RPP in Melbourne, Victoria
- Radio National in Orbost, Victoria
- SBS Radio in Mildura, Victoria
- Triple J in Kalgoorlie, Western Australia

== Brunei ==
- KRISTALfm in Tutong and Kuala Belait

== Canada (Channel 254) ==
- CBCB-FM in Owen Sound, Ontario
- CBCP-FM in Peterborough, Ontario
- CBQX-FM in Kenora, Ontario
- CBYM-FM in Mt. St. Margaret, Newfoundland and Labrador
- CBYN-FM in Nelson, British Columbia
- CHFB-FM in Bonnyville, Alberta
- CHGR-FM in Grand Rapids, Manitoba
- CHWN-FM in Skownan, Manitoba
- CICF-4-FM in Enderby, British Columbia
- CICV-FM in Cowichan Lake, British Columbia
- CIKI-FM in Rimouski, Quebec
- CJHR-FM in Renfrew, Ontario
- CKFG-FM in Toronto, Ontario
- CKNR-FM-1 in Elliot Lake, Ontario
- CKPM-FM in Port Moody, British Columbia
- CKRW-FM-1 in Atlin, British Columbia
- CKRW-FM-2 in Inuvik, Northwest Territories
- CKXD-FM in Gander, Newfoundland and Labrador
- VF2063 in Faro, Yukon
- VF2098 in Riley Creek, British Columbia
- VF2143 in Watson Lake, Yukon
- VF2148 in Mayo Road, Yukon
- VF2266 in Carcross, Yukon
- VF2267 in Carmacks, Yukon
- VF2268 in Mayo, Yukon
- VF2269 in Haines Junction, Yukon
- VF2270 in Teslin, Yukon
- VF2297 in Parson, British Columbia
- VF2388 in Ekati Mine Site, Northwest Territories

== Denmark ==
- Classic FM in Odense, Region Syddanmark
- Aarhus Studenterradio in Aarhus, Region Midtjylland
- Multikulturel Radio in Aarhus, Region Midtjylland

== Hong Kong ==
- RTHK Radio 4

== Indonesia ==
- Gen FM in Jakarta

== Malaysia ==
- TraXX FM in Kedah, Perlis dan Penang

== Mexico ==
- XHAB-FM in Santa Ana, Sonora
- XHBAK-FM in Chilón, Chiapas
- XHCPBS-FM in Nacajuca, Tabasco
- XHCSBP-FM in Huetamo, Michoacán
- XHEMY-FM in Ciudad Mante, Tamaulipas
- XHEOJ-FM in Lázaro Cárdenas, Michoacán
- XHFRC-FM in Monclova, Coahuila
- XHLC-FM in Guadalajara, Jalisco
- XHMQ-FM in Querétaro, Querétaro
- XHOZA-FM in Zaragoza, Coahuila
- XHPBA-FM in Puebla, Puebla
- XHPOR-FM in Putla de Guerrero, Oaxaca
- XHPRIO-FM in Río Grande, Zacatecas
- XHTAP-FM in Tapachula, Chiapas
- XHUAL-FM in Torreón, Coahuila
- XHVOX-FM in Mazatlán, Sinaloa

== Philippines ==
- DYFR in Cebu City
- DZFE in Pasig
- DWUB in Baguio
- DXFH in Zamboanga City
- DXQM in Davao City

== Singapore ==
- 987FM

== South Korea ==
- GFN (FM) in Gwangju
- KBS Happy FM in Chuncheon, Gangwon Province
- MBC FM4U in Ulsan

== Trinidad & Tobago ==
- BBC World Service at Port-of-Spain, & Scarborough

== United Kingdom ==
- Radio Cardiff in Cardiff

== United States (Channel 254) ==
- KACL in Bismarck, North Dakota
- KARO in Nyssa, Oregon
- KAVB (FM) in Hawthorne, Nevada
- KAWR in Reliance, Wyoming
- KBEE in Salt Lake City, Utah
- KBNM-LP in Belen, New Mexico
- KDIV-LP in Fayetteville, Arkansas
- KELI (FM) in San Angelo, Texas
- KFXP-LP in Wenatchee, Washington
- KGPS-LP in Kingman, Arizona
- KHKM in Hamilton, Montana
- KHWL in Lone Wolf, Oklahoma
- KISD (FM) in Pipestone, Minnesota
- KKST in Oakdale, Louisiana
- KLOQ in Winton, California
- KLTA in Moorhead, Minnesota
- KMGO in Centerville, Iowa
- KMLK in El Dorado, Arkansas
- KMNA in Mabton, Washington
- KMTH (FM) in Maljamar, New Mexico
- KMVP-FM in Phoenix, Arizona
- KNSS in Clearwater, Kansas
- KNVU-LP in Victorville, California
- KOTC-LP in Jefferson City, Missouri
- KOTX in Hebbronville, Texas
- KOUT in Rapid City, South Dakota
- KPRF in Amarillo, Texas
- KRQU in Laramie, Wyoming
- KRSV in Afton, Wyoming
- KRTZ in Cortez, Colorado
- KSGZ in Greenfield, California
- KSID-FM in Sidney, Nebraska
- KSMA-FM in Osage, Iowa
- KSNM in Truth or Consequence, New Mexico
- KSPF in Dallas, Texas
- KTXN-FM in Victoria, Texas
- KTXR in Springfield, Missouri
- KUBQ in La Grande, Oregon
- KUPL in Portland, Oregon
- KWPB-LP in Newport, Oregon
- KWXL-LP in Tucson, Arizona
- KXTS (FM) in Geyserville, California
- KYOA in Kiowa, Oklahoma
- KYSR in Los Angeles, California
- KYTT in Coos Bay, Oregon
- KZAM (FM) in Pleasant Valley, Texas
- WAKX in Palm Coast, Florida
- WASK in Battle Ground, Indiana
- WBHK in Warrior, Alabama
- WBTY in Homerville, Georgia
- WBYY in Somersworth, New Hampshire
- WCNK in Key West, Florida
- WCST-FM in Pocatalico, West Virginia
- WCZT in Villas, New Jersey
- WDZH in Detroit, Michigan
- WEPN-FM in New York, New York
- WESZ-LP in Abbeville, Alabama
- WFGR in Grand Rapids, Michigan
- WFMT in Chicago, Illinois
- WFXS in Pleasant Gap, Pennsylvania
- WGLI in Hancock, Michigan
- WGZO-LP in Bloomfield, Connecticut
- WHMG-LP in Purgitsville, West Virginia
- WHOP in Hopkinsville, Kentucky
- WINQ-FM in Winchester, New Hampshire
- WISK in Americus, Georgia
- WJKK in Vicksburg, Mississippi
- WKDO in Liberty, Kentucky
- WKGR in Wellington, Florida
- WKVZ in Holmes Beach, Florida
- WLCD-LP in Jackson, Tennessee
- WLCZ in Lincolnton, Georgia
- WLDN in Ludington, Michigan
- WLFQ-LP in Elkhart, Indiana
- WLZW in Utica, New York
- WMDC in Mayville, Wisconsin
- WMOF-LP in Live Oak, Florida
- WMZQ in Washington, District of Columbia
- WNEV in Friar's Point, Mississippi
- WNLC in East Lyme, Connecticut
- WNNS in Springfield, Illinois
- WNOR in Norfolk, Virginia
- WNVE in Culebra, Puerto Rico
- WOKI in Oliver Springs, Tennessee
- WOVK in Wheeling, West Virginia
- WPAC in Ogdensburg, New York
- WPCZ-LP in Demorest, Georgia
- WPHD in Corning, New York
- WPSI-LP in Miami, Florida
- WQME in Anderson, Indiana
- WRMR in Jacksonville, North Carolina
- WSDA-LP in Trenton, Georgia
- WSMW in Greensboro, North Carolina
- WUKQ-FM in Mayaguez, Puerto Rico
- WVMO-LP in Monona, Wisconsin
- WYCT in Pensacola, Florida
- WYKL in Crestline, Ohio
- WYKZ in Beaufort, South Carolina
- WYRO in Mcarthur, Ohio
