= RPP =

RPP may refer to:

== Academic journals ==
- Review of Philosophy and Psychology
- Review of Particle Physics, a Particle Data Group publication

== People ==
- Richard Paul Pavlick, a retired postal worker who stalked US President-elect John F. Kennedy with the intention of assassinating him in 1960

== Media ==
- Grupo RPP, a Peruvian media conglomerate
  - Radio Programas del Perú, their news radio station
- RPP FM, an Australian community radio station

== Political parties ==
- People's Rally for Progress (French: Rassemblement Populaire pour le Progrès), Djibouti
- Rastriya Prajatantra Party, Nepal
- Reformed Political Party, Netherlands
- Republican People's Party, Turkey

== Other uses ==
- Rate pressure product, in heart medicine
- Registered Professional Planner, a Canadian qualification
- Rho Pi Phi, a professional pharmacy fraternity
- Bus Route Planning Programme
- RESTful Provisioning Protocol, a proposed series of IETF specifications
