= Aliskiren/amlodipine =

Pharmaceutical drug

Combination of
- Aliskiren: Renin inhibitor
- Amlodipine: Calcium channel blocker (dihydropyridine)

Clinical data
- Trade names: Tekamlo, Rasilamlo
- AHFS/Drugs.com: Professional Drug Facts
- License data: US FDA: Tekamlo
- Pregnancy category: C in first trimester; D in second and third trimesters
- Routes of administration: By mouth
- ATC code: C09XA53 (WHO)

Legal status
- Legal status: In general: ℞ (Prescription only)

Identifiers
- CAS Number: 1416233-20-9

The drug combination aliskiren/amlodipine (INNs, trade names Tekamlo and Rasilamlo) is an antihypertensive. Clinical trials have shown it to be more effective than amlodipine on its own, with a high dosing regime (aliskiren 300 mg/amlodipine 10 mg) being more effective than olmesartan/amlodipine with comparable tolerability.
