= WGZO =

WGZO may refer to:

- WGZO-LP, a low-power radio station (98.7 FM) licensed to serve Bloomfield, Connecticut, United States
- WVSC (FM), a radio station (103.1 FM) licensed to serve Parris Island, South Carolina, United States, which held the call sign WGZO from 1997 to 2014
