= Olmesartan/amlodipine/hydrochlorothiazide =

Combination drug

Combination of
- Olmesartan: Angiotensin II antagonist
- Amlodipine: Calcium channel blocker
- Hydrochlorothiazide: Thiazide diuretic

Clinical data
- Trade names: Tribenzor, Sevikar HCT
- AHFS/Drugs.com: Micromedex Detailed Consumer Information
- License data: US DailyMed: Olmesartan and amlodipine and hydrochlorothiazide
- Pregnancy category: AU: D
- Routes of administration: By mouth
- ATC code: C09DX03 (WHO)

Legal status
- Legal status: AU: S4 (Prescription only); US: ℞-only

Identifiers
- CAS Number: 1394251-60-5
- KEGG: D10288

Olmesartan/amlodipine/hydrochlorothiazide, sold under the brand name Tribenzor among others, is a fixed-dose combination medication used to treat high blood pressure. It contains olmesartan medoxomil, an angiotensin II receptor blocker, amlodipine, as the besilate, a calcium channel blocker, and hydrochlorothiazide, a thiazide diuretic. It is taken by mouth.
