= KOTX =

Radio station in Hebbronville–Laredo, Texas

- Hebbronville, Texas; United States
- Broadcast area: Laredo, Texas; Nuevo Laredo
- Frequency: 98.7 MHz
- Branding: NotiGAPE Nuevo Laredo

Programming
- Format: News/talk
- Affiliations: Radio Fórmula

Ownership
- Owner: Xavier Cantú; (Xavier Entertainment, LLC)
- Operator: Grupo GAPE

History
- First air date: 2014

Technical information
- Licensing authority: FCC
- Facility ID: 171012
- Class: A
- ERP: 1,000 watts
- HAAT: 19 meters (62 ft)
- Transmitter coordinates: 27°18′30″N 98°40′15″W
- Repeater: 104.1 K281CB (Laredo North)

Links
- Public license information: Public file; LMS
- Webcast: NotiGAPE Nuevo Laredo
- Website: notigape.com

KOTX is a radio station broadcasting on 98.7 FM, licensed to Hebbronville, Texas, United States. The station feeds a dependent translator, K281CB on 104.1 FM licensed to Laredo North. This translator provides coverage in the border area of Laredo, Texas and Nuevo Laredo, Tamaulipas. KOTX is owned by Xavier Cantú, through licensee Xavier Entertainment, LLC; K281CB is owned by Grupo GAPE (Gape Group, Inc.) GAPE programs both stations with a Spanish-language news/talk format as NotiGAPE Nuevo Laredo.

== History ==
KM Communications won a construction permit for a new FM station in Hebbronville on February 28, 2011. It assigned the permit later in the year to José Antonio Aguilar, and the station finally signed on in February 2014. It was off the air for nearly a year from March 2014 to March 2015, with Aguilar citing an inability to staff the station full-time.

In June 2018, with the combination of KOTX and translator K281CB, Grupo GAPE began programming the station as NotiGAPE Nuevo Laredo, a news/talk outlet similar to stations owned by the company on the Mexican side of the border in Reynosa and Matamoros. In this capacity, KOTX-K281CB carries Radio Fórmula programming that the network's XHNLT-FM 96.1 does not, as well as Tamaulipas statewide news from NotiGAPE and local news for the two Laredos.

In February 2020, 35 Communications—a company majority controlled by Aguilar—sold KOTX for $83,000 to Xavier Cantú. The Federal Communications Commission approved the sale on March 31, 2020, and it was consummated on May 8, 2020.
