= Olmesartan/hydrochlorothiazide =

Combination drug

Combination of
- Olmesartan: Angiotensin II antagonist
- Hydrochlorothiazide: Thiazide diuretic

Clinical data
- Trade names: Benicar HCT, Benitec H, others
- AHFS/Drugs.com: Micromedex Detailed Consumer Information
- License data: US DailyMed: Olmesartan hydrochlorothiazide
- Routes of administration: By mouth
- ATC code: C09DA08 (WHO)

Legal status
- Legal status: US: ℞-only

Identifiers
- CAS Number: 760190-74-7
- KEGG: D10284

Olmesartan/hydrochlorothiazide, sold under the brand name Benicar HCT among others, is a fixed-dose combination medication used to treat high blood pressure. It is a combination of olmesartan medoxomil, an angiotensin II receptor blocker and hydrochlorothiazide, a diuretic. It may be used if olmesartan is not sufficient to manage blood pressure. It is taken by mouth.

Common side effects include nausea, dizziness, and upper respiratory tract infections. Serious side effects may include kidney problems, allergic reactions, electrolyte problems and low blood pressure. Use in pregnancy is not recommended. Olmesartan works by blocking the effects of angiotensin II while hydrochlorothiazide works by increasing the loss of sodium by the kidneys.

No generic version is available in the United States as of 2017. In 2022, it was the 235th most commonly prescribed medication in the United States, with more than 1 million prescriptions.
