= Medoxomil =

Ester formed from the medoxomil group

Medoxomil, also known as medocaril, is a chemical group used in some prodrugs. It is a lipophilic group that is attached as an ester to the parent drug to improve oral absorption. Once ingested, it undergoes rapid enzymatic hydrolysis in the body, releasing the active carboxylic acid form.

Examples include:

- Olmesartan medoxomil - an angiotensin II receptor blocker (ARB) prodrug, hydrolyzes to olmesartan
- Azilsartan medoxomil - an ARB prodrug, hydrolyzes to olmesartan
- Ceftobiprole medocaril - a cephalosporin antibiotic prodrug, hydrolyzes to ceftobiprole
