= XHPOR-FM =

Radio station in Putla Villa de Guerrero, Oaxaca

- Putla, Oaxaca; Mexico
- Frequency: 98.7 FM
- Branding: Tprende Radio

Programming
- Format: Regional Mexican

Ownership
- Owner: Michael Armando Meneses Olaya

History
- First air date: August 8, 1991 (concession)

Technical information
- Class: AA
- ERP: 6 kW
- Transmitter coordinates: 16°59′28.6″N 97°56′25.38″W

XHPOR-FM is a radio station on 98.7 FM in Putla, Oaxaca. It is known as Tprende and carries a Regional Mexican.

== History ==
XEPOR-AM 890 received its concession on August 8, 1991. It was owned by Luis Carlos Mendiola Codina. XEPOR was promptly moved to 740 kHz. Michael Armando Meneses Olaya acquired XEPOR in 2004.

XEPOR received approval to migrate to FM in 2010.
