= Ceftobiprole =

Chemical compound

Clinical data
- Trade names: Zevtera, Mabelio
- Other names: RO0639141-000, BAL9141, ceftobiprole medocaril, ceftobiprole medocaril sodium
- AHFS/Drugs.com: Zevtera
- License data: US DailyMed: Ceftobiprole
- Routes of administration: Intravenous
- Drug class: Cephalosporin antibacterial
- ATC code: J01DI01 (WHO)

Legal status
- Legal status: AU: S4 (Prescription only); CA: ℞-only; UK: POM (Prescription only); US: ℞-only; In general: ℞ (Prescription only)

Identifiers
- IUPAC name: (6R,7R)-7-[[(2Z)-2-(5-amino-1,2,4-thiadiazol-3-ylidene)- 2-nitroso-1-oxoethyl]amino]-8-oxo-3-[(E)-[2-oxo-1-[(3R)- 3-pyrrolidinyl]-3-pyrrolidinylidene]methyl]-5-thia-1- azabicyclo[4.2.0]oct-2-ene-2-carboxylic acid
- CAS Number: 209467-52-7; as medocaril: 252188-71-9
- PubChem CID: 6918430; as medocaril: 135413543
- DrugBank: DB04918; as medocaril: DB14733
- ChemSpider: 23350302; as medocaril: 30791463
- UNII: 5T97333YZK; as medocaril: N99027V28J
- KEGG: D08885; as medocaril: D08886
- ChEMBL: ChEMBL520642
- CompTox Dashboard (EPA): DTXSID40870229
- ECHA InfoCard: 100.129.666

Chemical and physical data
- Formula: C_{20}H_{22}N_{8}O_{6}S_{2}
- Molar mass: 534.57 g·mol^{−1}
- 3D model (JSmol): Interactive image
- SMILES: C1CNC[C@@H]1N2CC/C(=C\C3=C(N4[C@@H]([C@@H](C4=O)NC(=O)/C(=N\O)/c5nc(sn5)N)SC3)C(=O)O)/C2=O
- InChI: InChI=1S/C20H22N8O6S2/c21-20-24-14(26-36-20)11(25-34)15(29)23-12-17(31)28-13(19(32)33)9(7-35-18(12)28)5-8-2-4-27(16(8)30)10-1-3-22-6-10/h5,10,12,18,22,34H,1-4,6-7H2,(H,23,29)(H,32,33)(H2,21,24,26)/b8-5+,25-11-/t10-,12-,18-/m1/s1; Key:VOAZJEPQLGBXGO-SDAWRPRTSA-N

Ceftobiprole, sold under the brand name Zevtera among others, is a fifth-generation cephalosporin antibacterial used for the treatment of hospital-acquired pneumonia (excluding ventilator-associated pneumonia) and community-acquired pneumonia. It is marketed by Basilea Pharmaceutica under the brand names Zevtera and Mabelio. Like other cephalosporins, ceftobiprole exerts its antibacterial activity by binding to important penicillin-binding proteins and inhibiting their transpeptidase activity which is essential for the synthesis of bacterial cell walls. Ceftobiprole has high affinity for penicillin-binding protein 2a of methicillin-resistant Staphylococcus aureus strains and retains its activity against strains that express divergent mecA gene homologues (mecC or mecALGA251). Ceftobiprole also binds to penicillin-binding protein 2b in Streptococcus pneumoniae (penicillin-intermediate), to penicillin-binding protein 2x in Streptococcus pneumoniae (penicillin-resistant), and to penicillin-binding protein 5 in Enterococcus faecalis.

For adults with Staphylococcus aureus bloodstream infections (bacteremia), the most common side effects include anemia, nausea, low levels of potassium in the blood (hypokalemia), vomiting, diarrhea, increased levels of certain liver tests (hepatic enzymes and bilirubin), increased blood creatinine, high blood pressure, low white blood cell count (leukopenia), fever, abdominal pain, fungal infection, headache and shortness of breath (dyspnea). For adults with acute bacterial skin and skin structure infections, the most common side effects include nausea, diarrhea, headache, injection site reaction, increased levels of hepatic enzymes, rash, vomiting and altered taste (dysgeusia). For adults with community-acquired bacterial pneumonia, the most common side effects include nausea, increased levels of hepatic enzymes, vomiting, diarrhea, headache, rash, insomnia, abdominal pain, vein inflammation (phlebitis), high blood pressure and dizziness. For children with community-acquired bacterial pneumonia, the most common side effects include vomiting, headache, increased levels of hepatic enzymes, diarrhea, infusion site reaction, vein inflammation (phlebitis) and fever.

Ceftobiprole medocaril was approved for medical use in the United States in April 2024.

== Medical uses ==
In the US, ceftobiprole is indicated for the treatment of adults with Staphylococcus aureus bloodstream infections (bacteremia) including those with right-sided infective endocarditis; adults with acute bacterial skin and skin structure infections (ABSSSI); and people with community-acquired bacterial pneumonia.

== Microbiology ==
Ceftobiprole has shown in vitro antimicrobial activity against a broad range of Gram-positive and Gram-negative pathogens. Among the Gram-positive pathogens, ceftobiprole has demonstrated good in vitro activity against methicillin-resistant Staphylococcus aureus, methicillin-susceptible Staphylococcus aureus and coagulase-negative staphylococci, as well as against strains of methicillin-resistant Staphylococcus aureus with reduced susceptibility to linezolid, daptomycin or vancomycin. Ceftobiprole has also displayed potent activity against Streptococcus pneumoniae (including penicillin-sensitive, penicillin-resistant and ceftriaxone-resistant strains) and Enterococcus faecalis, but not against Enterococcus faecium. For Gram-negative pathogens, ceftobiprole has shown good in vitro activity against Haemophilus influenzae (including both ampicillin-susceptible and ampicillin-non-susceptible isolates), Pseudomonas aeruginosa and strains of Escherichia coli, Klebsiella pneumoniae and Proteus mirabilis that do not produce extended-spectrum β-lactamases. Like all other cephalosporins, ceftobiprole was inactive against strains that produce extended-spectrum β-lactamases.

The efficacy of ceftobiprole has been demonstrated in two large randomized, double-blind, phase III clinical trials in patients with hospital-acquired and community-acquired pneumonia. Ceftobiprole was non-inferior to ceftazidime plus linezolid in the treatment of hospital-acquired pneumonia (excluding ventilator-acquired pneumonia) and non-inferior to ceftriaxone with or without linezolid in the treatment of community-acquired pneumonia.

Ceftobiprole has demonstrated significant antibiofilm activity, outperforming rifampin, vancomycin, and daptomycin against S. aureus. Consequently, its role in hardware-associated infections is increasingly being considered.

== Pharmacology ==
Ceftobiprole medocaril

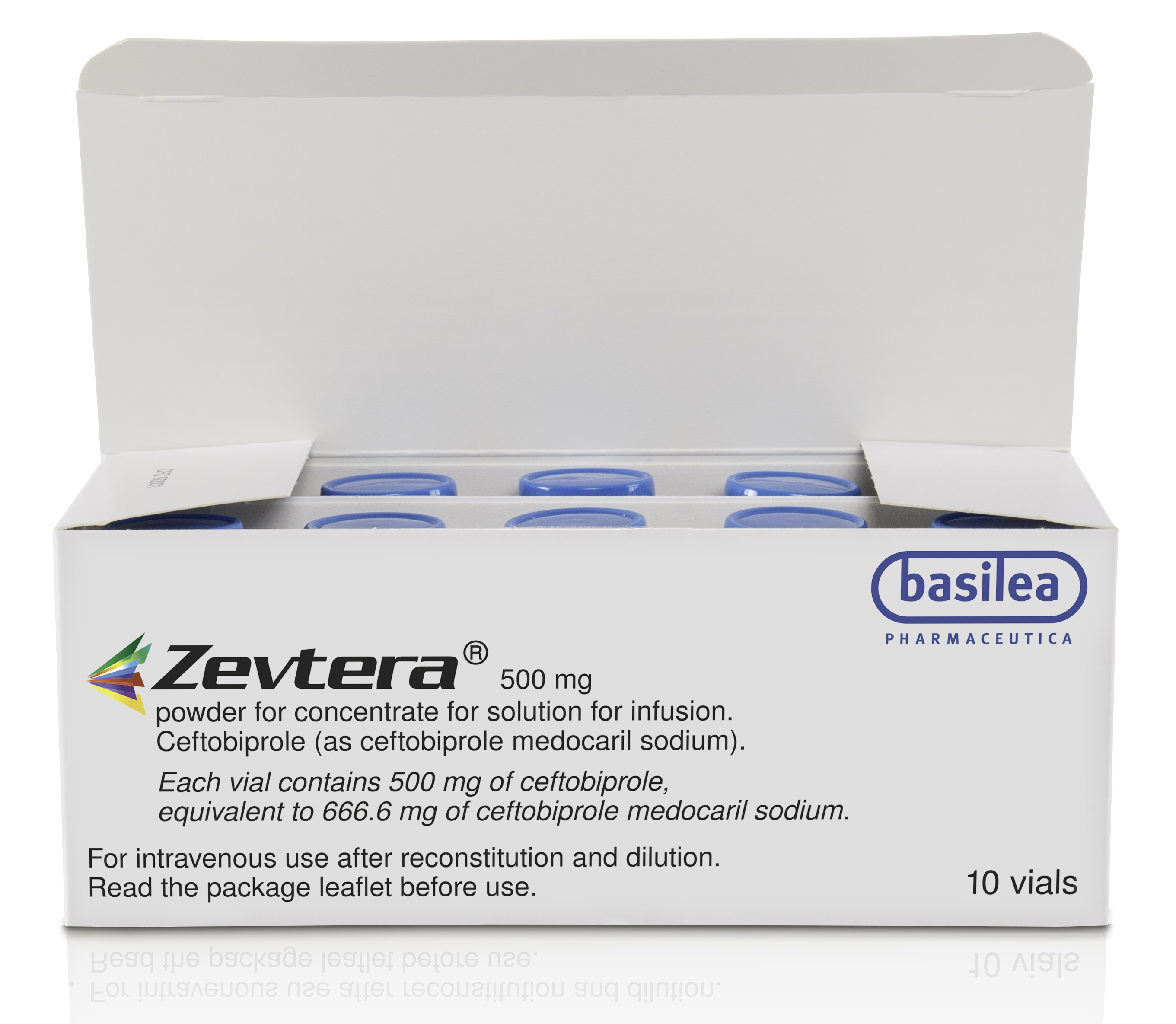

Ceftobiprole is the active metabolite of the medocaril prodrug ceftobiprole medocaril and is available for intravenous treatment only. It is mainly excreted via the kidney.

== History ==
The efficacy of ceftobiprole medocaril in treating Staphylococcus aureus bloodstream infections (bacteremia) was evaluated in a randomized, controlled, double-blind, multinational, multicenter trial. In the trial, researchers randomly assigned 390 participants to receive ceftobiprole medocaril (192 participants) or daptomycin plus optional aztreonam [the comparator] (198 participants). The primary measure of efficacy for this trial was the overall success (defined as survival, symptom improvement, S. aureus bacteremia bloodstream clearance, no new S. aureus bacteremia complications and no use of other potentially effective antibiotics) at the post-treatment evaluation visit, which occurred 70 days after being randomly assigned an antibiotic. A total of 69.8% of participants who received ceftobiprole medocaril achieved overall success compared to 68.7% of participants who received the comparator.

The efficacy of ceftobiprole medocaril in treating acute bacterial skin and skin structure infections was evaluated in a randomized, controlled, double-blind, multinational trial. In the trial, researchers randomly assigned 679 participants to receive either ceftobiprole medocaril (335 participants) or vancomycin plus aztreonam [the comparator] (344 participants). The primary measure of efficacy was early clinical response 48-72 hours after start of treatment. Early clinical response required a reduction of the primary skin lesion by at least 20%, survival for at least 72 hours and the absence of additional antibacterial treatment or unplanned surgery. Of the participants who received ceftobiprole medocaril, 91.3% achieved an early clinical response within the necessary timeframe compared to 88.1% of participants who received the comparator.

The efficacy of ceftobiprole medocaril in treating adults with community-acquired bacterial pneumonia was evaluated in a randomized, controlled, double-blind, multinational, multicenter trial. In the trial, researchers randomly assigned 638 adults hospitalized with community-acquired bacterial pneumonia and requiring IV antibacterial treatment for at least 3 days to receive either ceftobiprole medocaril (314 participants) or ceftriaxone with optional linezolid [the comparator] (324 participants). The primary measurement of efficacy were clinical cure rates at test-of-cure visit, which occurred 7-14 days after end-of-treatment. Of the participants who received ceftobiprole medocaril, 76.4% achieved clinical cure compared to 79.3% of participants who received the comparator. An additional analysis considered an earlier timepoint of clinical success at Day 3, which was 71% in participants receiving ceftobiprole medocaril and 71.1% in participants receiving the comparator.

Given the similar course of community-acquired bacterial pneumonia in adults and children, the approval of ceftobiprole medocaril in children three months to less than eighteen years of age with community-acquired bacterial pneumonia was supported by evidence from the community-acquired bacterial pneumonia trial of ceftobiprole medocaril in adults and a trial in 138 children three months to less than eighteen years of age with pneumonia.

The US Food and Drug Administration (FDA) granted the application for ceftobiprole medocaril priority review, fast track, and qualified infectious disease product designations for the community-acquired bacterial pneumonia, acute bacterial skin and skin structure infections, and Staphylococcus aureus bloodstream infections (bacteremia) indications. The FDA granted the approval of Zevtera to Basilea Pharmaceutica International Ltd.

== Society and culture ==
=== Legal status ===
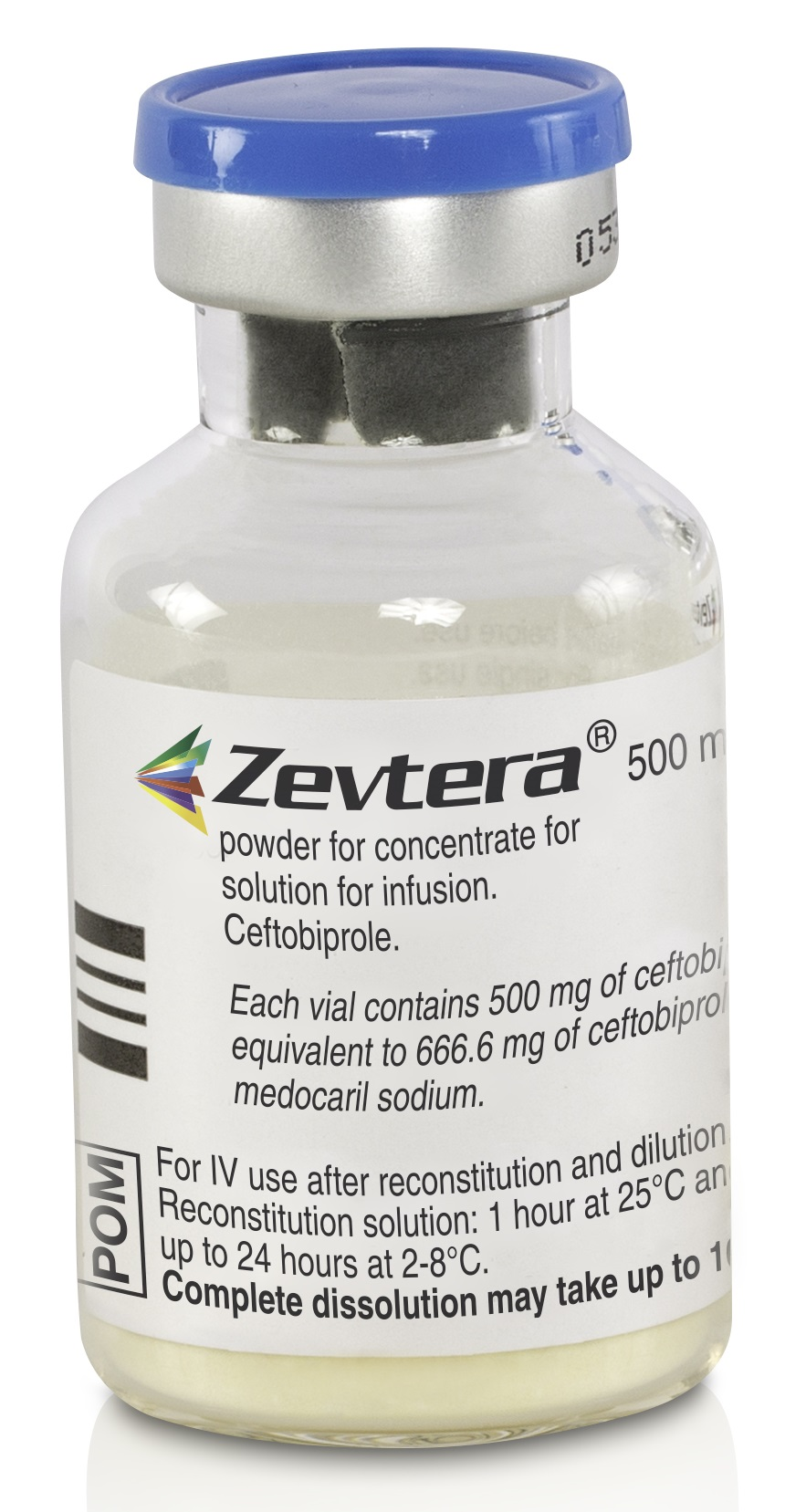
500 mg powder

Ceftobiprole has been approved for the treatment of adults with hospital acquired pneumonia (excluding ventilator-acquired pneumonia) and community-acquired pneumonia in twelve European countries, Canada, and Switzerland.

In February 2010, the Committee for Medicinal Products for Human Use of the European Medicines Agency adopted a negative opinion, recommending the refusal of the marketing authorization for the medicinal product Zeftera, intended for treatment of complicated skin and soft-tissue infections in adults. The company that applied for authorization is Janssen-Cilag International N.V. The applicant requested a re-examination of the opinion. After considering the grounds for this request, the CHMP re-examined the opinion, and confirmed the refusal of the marketing authorization in June 2010.
