= Lisinopril/hydrochlorothiazide =

Combination drug used to treat high blood pressure

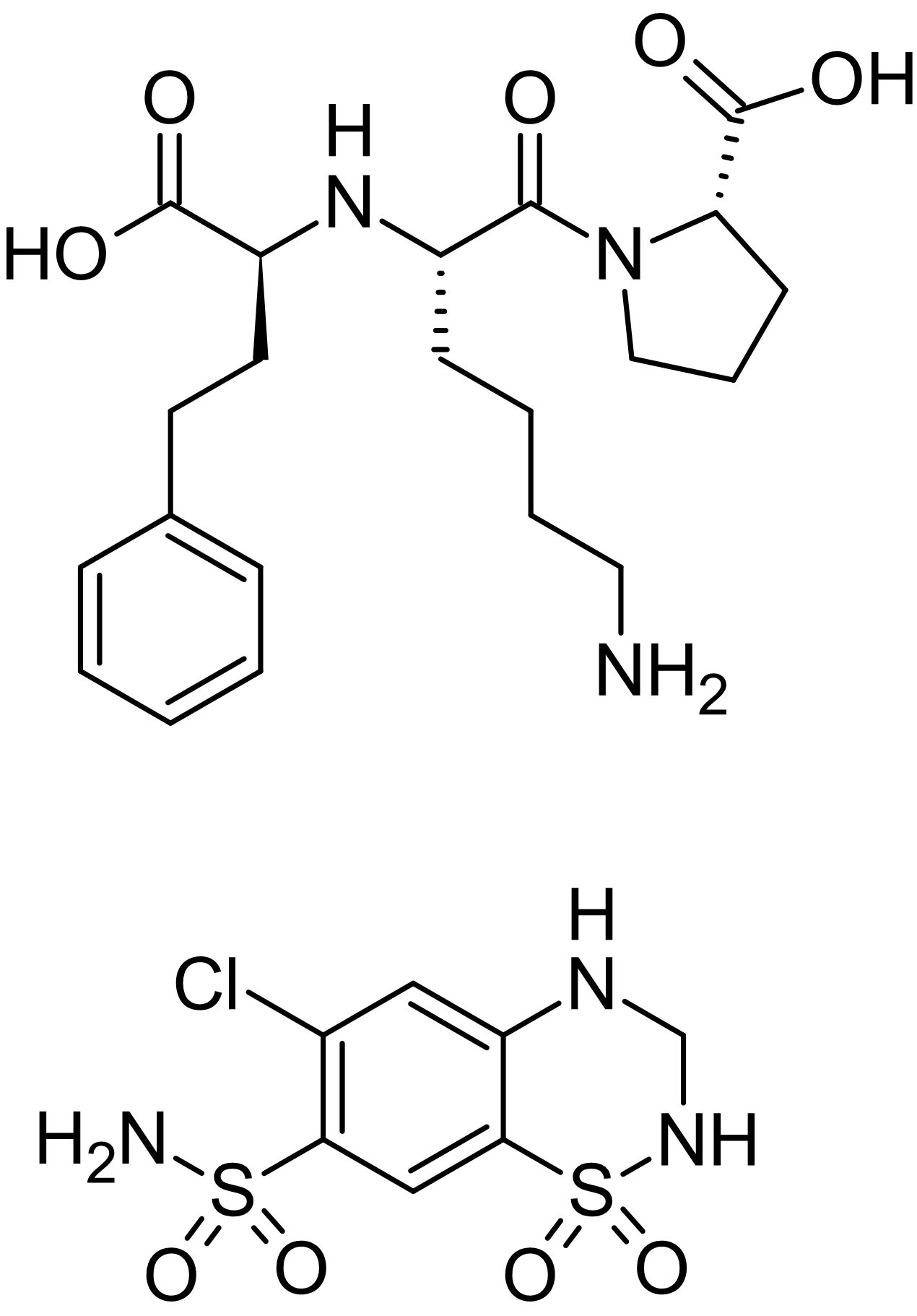
- Lisinopril (top) and hydrochlorothiazide (bottom)

Combination of
- Lisinopril: ACE inhibitor
- Hydrochlorothiazide: Thiazide diuretic

Clinical data
- Trade names: Zestoretic, Prinzide, others
- Other names: lisinopril/hctz
- AHFS/Drugs.com: Micromedex Detailed Consumer Information
- MedlinePlus: a601070
- License data: US DailyMed: Lisinopril and hydrochlorothiazide
- Pregnancy category: Contraindicated
- Routes of administration: By mouth
- ATC code: C09BA03 (WHO)

Legal status
- Legal status: CA: ℞-only; US: ℞-only; In general: ℞ (Prescription only)

Identifiers
- CAS Number: 151063-30-8
- KEGG: D10268

Lisinopril/hydrochlorothiazide, sold under the brand name Zestoretic among others, is a fixed-dose combination medication used for the treatment of high blood pressure (hypertension). It contains lisinopril, an ACE inhibitor, and hydrochlorothiazide, a diuretic. Typically, it becomes an option once a person is doing well on the individual components. It is taken by mouth.

Common side effects include dizziness, headache, cough, and feeling tired. Severe side effects may include angioedema and low blood pressure. Use during pregnancy may harm the baby.

The combination was approved for medical use in the United States in 1989. It is on the World Health Organization's List of Essential Medicines. It is available as a generic medication. In 2023, the combination was the 58th most commonly prescribed medication in the United States, with more than 10 million prescriptions.

== Medical uses ==
Lisinopril/hydrochlorothiazide is indicated for the treatment of hypertension, to lower blood pressure.

== Adverse effects ==
The US Food and Drug Administration prescribing information for the combination contains a boxed warning about harm to the baby.
