= CFYT-FM =

Radio station in Dawson City, Yukon, Canada

Coordinates: 64°03′26″N 139°24′45″W

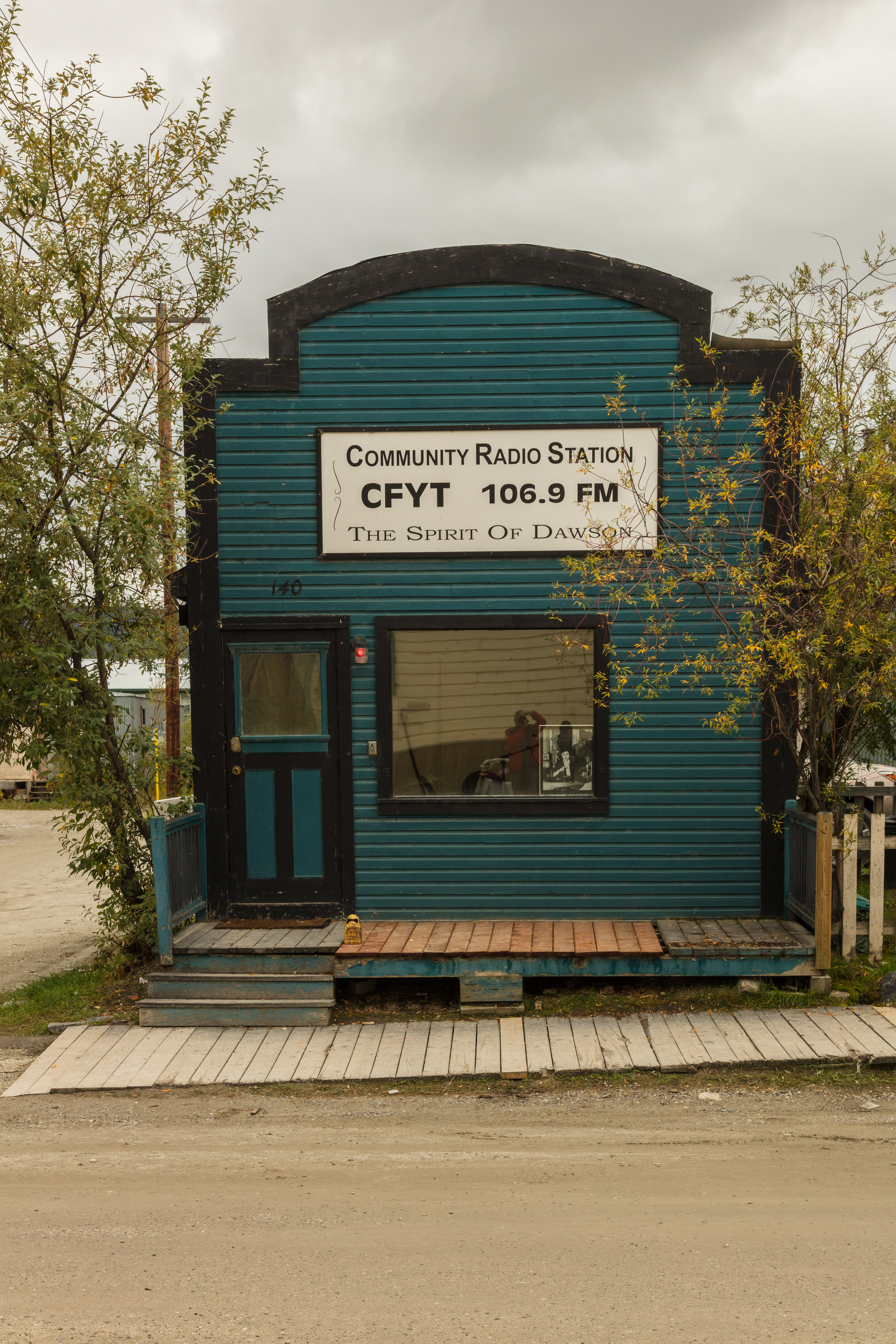
- Dawson City, Yukon; Canada
- Frequency: 106.9 MHz

Programming
- Format: Community radio; Hot adult contemporary

Ownership
- Owner: Dawson City Community Radio Society

History
- First air date: 1948
- Call sign meaning: Canadian Forces Yukon Territory

Technical information
- Class: VLP
- ERP: 5 watts

Links
- Website: cfyt.ca

CFYT-FM is a Canadian radio station, broadcasting at 106.9 FM in Dawson City, Yukon, Canada. The station airs a community radio format.

CFYT-FM is a volunteer-driven community radio station operated by the Dawson City Community Radio Society, a non-profit organization that was established in 1984. The DCCRS also administers the Rolling Ads, a community announcement board on DCTV cable channel 11, and special community events are televised on channel 12. When not originating local programming, the station simulcasts Whitehorse's CKRW-FM.

== History ==
Radio was first initiated in Dawson City in October 1923, when the Royal Canadian Signals opened one of two radio stations in the north — the other was in Mayo — to serve mining operations in the area and to provide contact for boats and aircraft. It wasn't until 1948 that plans were made by the Signals to install a civilian broadcasting station in Dawson City to be operated by the community. A town radio committee was formed and CFYT commenced broadcasting on April 1 of that year. The CFYT call signal was established at that point — it stands for "Canadian Forces Yukon Territory".

The station was taken over by the Dawson City Community Radio Society in 1984. Due to a financial crisis, the station briefly lost its CRTC license in the early 2000s, but was relaunched in 2006.

In early 2009, CFYT 106.9 began its first website, and later in the year online streaming audio was added. The website continues to offer live audio during all local CFYT broadcasting hours.

On May 21, 2009, the Dawson City Community Radio Society applied for a new community FM low-power radio station to operate at 106.9 MHz which received CRTC approval on October 27, 2009.
