= XHEOJ-FM =

Radio station in Lázaro Cárdenas, Michoacán, Mexico

- Lázaro Cárdenas, Michoacán; Mexico
- Frequency: 98.7 FM
- Branding: Radio Centro 9 87

Programming
- Format: Pop
- Affiliations: Grupo Radio Centro

Ownership
- Owner: Sucesión de Francisco Bautista Valencia
- Operator: Grupo Gapa Comunicaciones

History
- First air date: March 13, 1978 (concession)
- Former call signs: XEOJ-AM
- Former frequencies: 1400 kHz

Technical information
- ERP: 25 kW
- HAAT: 22.5 meters
- Transmitter coordinates: 17°57′53.3″N 102°11′49.0″W

Links
- Webcast: Listen live

XHEOJ-FM is a radio station on 98.7 FM in Lázaro Cárdenas, Michoacán, Mexico, known as Radio Centro 9 87.

== History ==
XEOJ-AM received its concession on March 13, 1978. It was owned by Francisco Bautista Valencia and broadcast with 1 kW day and 100 watts night on 1400 kHz. Nighttime power was raised to 1 kW in the 1980s.

XEOJ received approval to migrate to FM in 2012.

In 2017, XHEOJ ditched its longtime Radio Horizonte brand for the Ke Buena grupera format—a decision that lasted a year—and went 24 hours. The change came with controversy among station employees over working hours, and a judge ordered the station to respect the preexisting work schedules of station employees where management had placed them on new overnight shifts. In January 2019, XHEOJ rebranded as "Radio Centro 9 87".
