= Lisinopril/amlodipine =

Combination drug used to treat high blood pressure

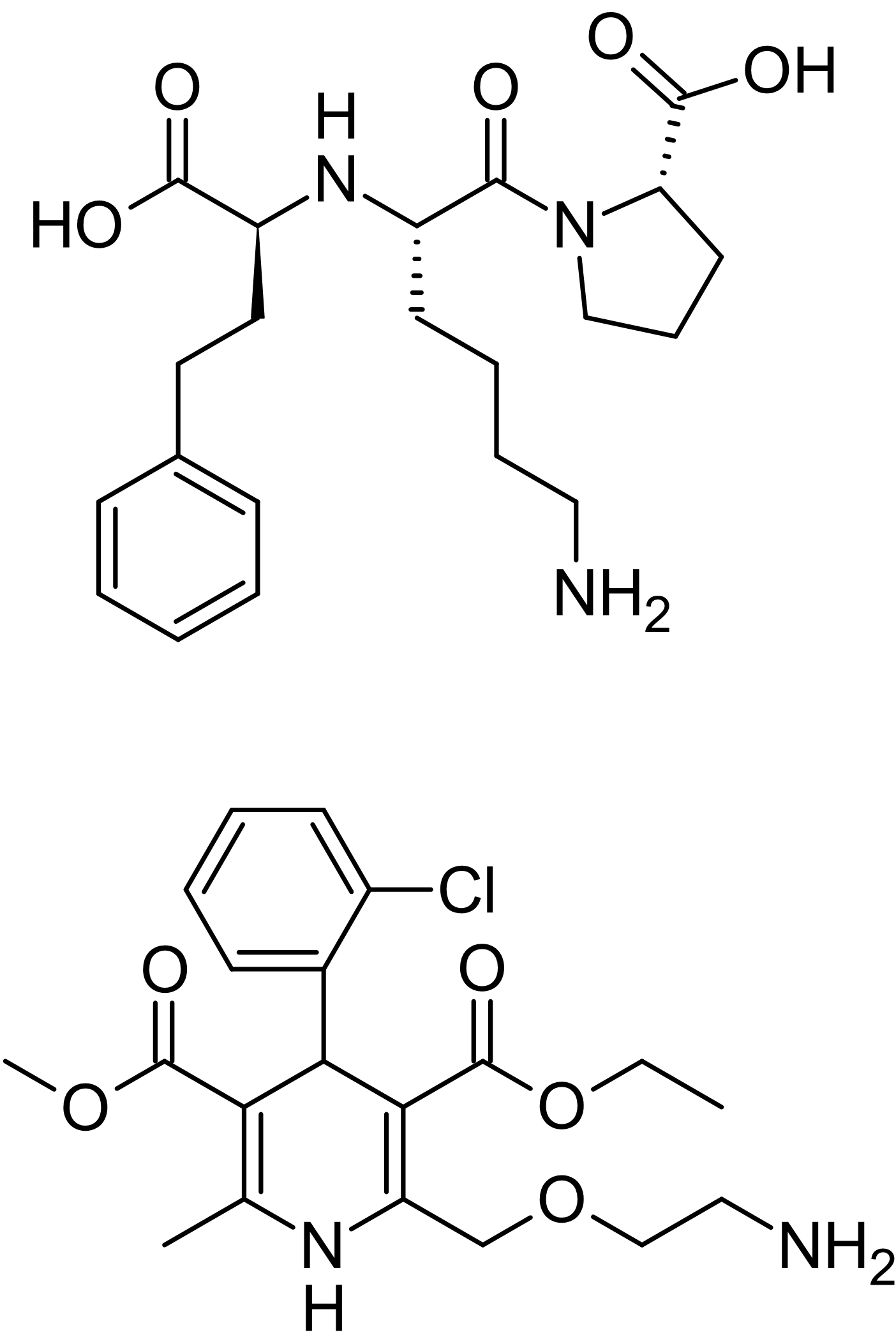
- Lisinopril (top) and amlodipine (bottom)

Combination of
- Lisinopril: ACE inhibitor
- Amlodipine: Calcium channel blocker

Clinical data
- Trade names: Lisonorm, Dironorm, others
- Routes of administration: By mouth
- ATC code: C09BB03 (WHO)

Legal status
- Legal status: EU: Rx-only; In general: ℞ (Prescription only)

Lisinopril/amlodipine, sold under the brand name Lisonorm among others, is a medication used to treat high blood pressure. It is a combination of lisinopril, an ACE inhibitor, with amlodipine, a calcium channel blocker. It may be used when blood pressure is not well controlled with each of the two agents alone. It is taken by mouth.

Side effects may include low blood pressure, kidney problems, liver problems, cough, and high blood potassium. It should not be used in people who have previously had angioedema due to ACE inhibitors. Use is not recommended during pregnancy or breastfeeding. Lisinopril works by decreasing angiotensin II and increasing bradykinin while amlodipine decreases the entry of calcium into the muscle cells in the heart and blood cells.

The combination was approved for medical use in the European Union in 2008. The combination on the World Health Organization's List of Essential Medicines. While it is available in India and the European Union it is not available in Canada, Australia, or the United States as of 2019.

== Pharmacology ==
Lisinopril/amlodipine is a combination of two agents which both act to induce vascular smooth muscle relaxation to lower blood pressure in distinct ways:

- Lisinopril inhibits angiotensin converting enzyme (ACE), the enzyme responsible for converting angiotensin I into angiotensin II (a vasoconstrictor).
- Amlodipine inhibits influx of calcium into smooth muscle cells through calcium channels thereby inhibiting Ca-dependent contraction.
