= Universidad Autónoma de La Laguna =

Autonomous University of La Laguna
- Universidad Autónoma de La Laguna
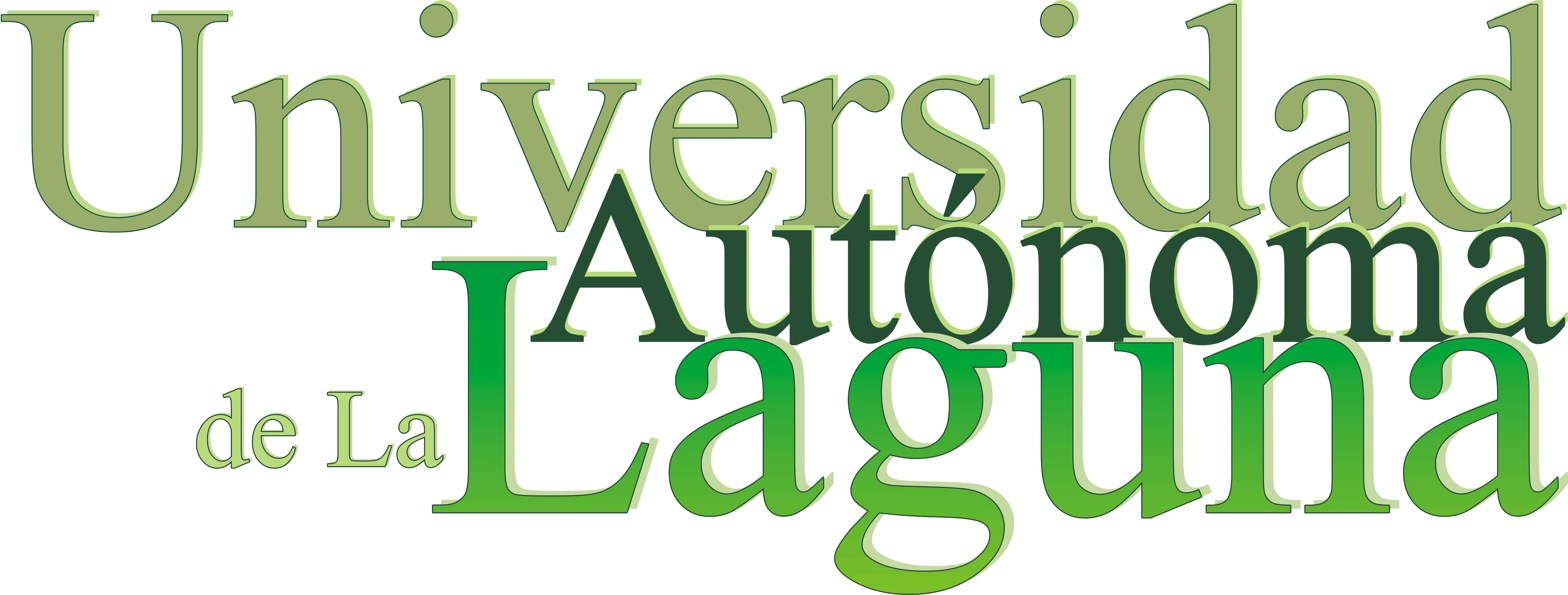
- Motto: Vencimos al Desierto, Cultivamos el Espíritu
- Motto in English: We Conquered the Desert, We Cultivate the Spirit
- Type: Private
- Established: December 4, 1988
- Parent institution: Universidad Autónoma de La Laguna, A.C.
- Rector: Omar Lozano Cantú
- Students: 4,800
- Location: Torreón, Coahuila, Mexico
- Colours: Dark green and light green
- Mascot: Halcones
- Website: ual.mx

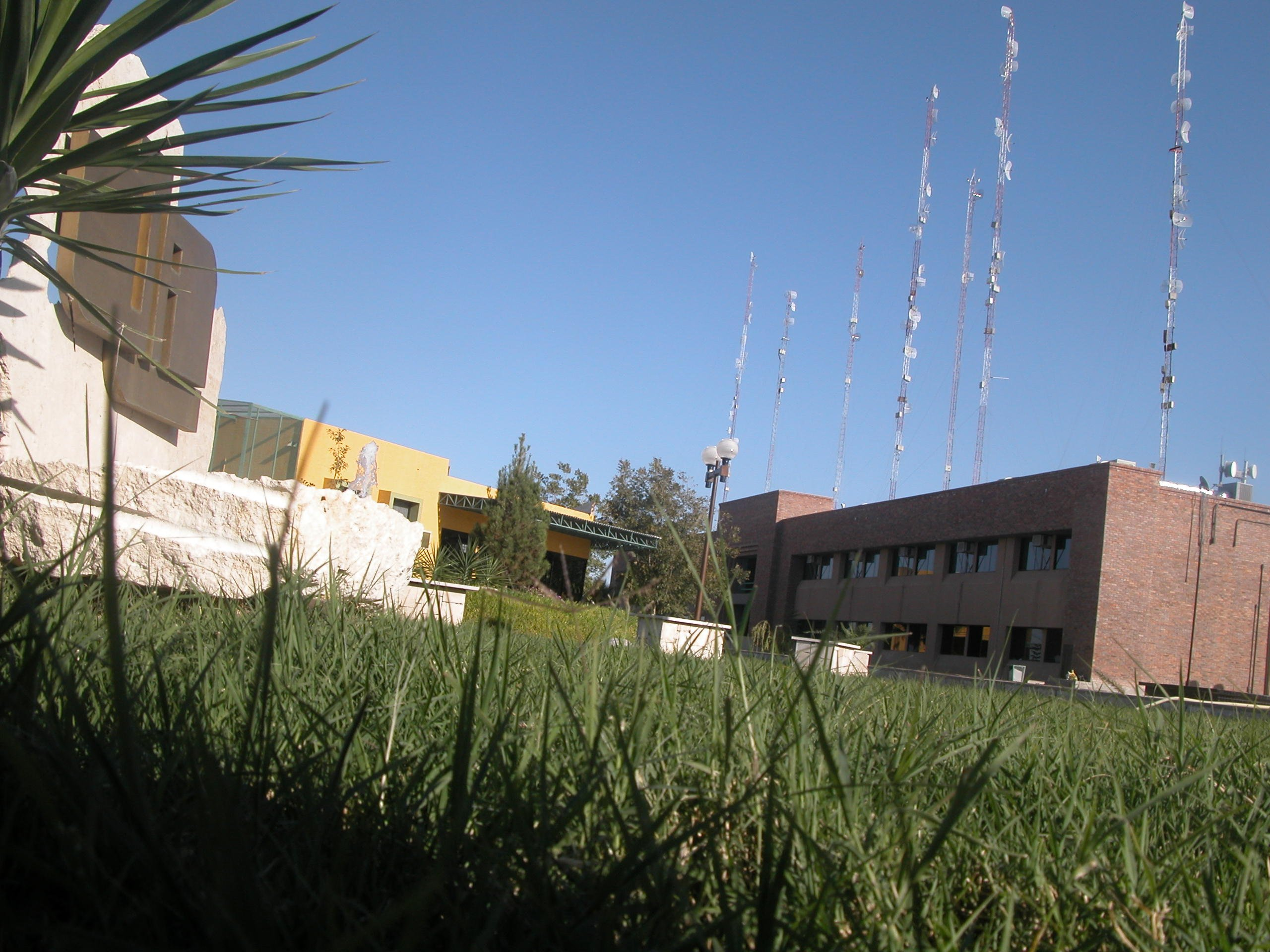

The Universidad Autónoma de La Laguna (Autonomous University of La Laguna, commonly referred to as UAL) is a private university located in Torreón, Coahuila, Mexico. It was founded in December 1988 by professor Pedro H. Rivas Figueroa.

The university includes four schools: the College of Administrative Sciences, the College of Sciences and Engineering, the College of Humanities, and the College of Health Sciences. UAL also operates a natural history museum and a university radio station, XHUAL-FM 98.7.

== History ==
UAL was founded on December 4, 1988. On January 17, 1989, the university formally began academic activities. Construction on the university campus began in April 1989, with the first building opening in August 1990.

The university's history has been marked by expansion in facilities and programs. The radio station began operations in 2006.

== Academics ==
=== Undergraduate (licenciatura) ===
==== College of Administrative Sciences ====
- Business Administration
- Management of Tourism Enterprises
- Gastronomic Business Administration
- Public Works Administration
- Human Resources Management
- International Trade
- Public Accounting
- Marketing

==== College of Sciences and Engineering ====
- Architecture
- Business Informatics Engineering
- Engineering in Mechatronics
- Automotive Systems Engineering
- Computer Systems Engineering
- Industrial and Systems Engineering
- Graphic Design and Communication

==== College of Humanities ====
- Visual Arts
- Education Sciences
- Communication and Journalism
- Law

==== College of Health Sciences ====
- Optometry
- Psychology

=== Graduate ===
- Specialty in Real Estate and Industrial Valuation
- Master in Business Administration
- Master in Human Resources Management
- Master of Education
- Master in Family and Couples Therapy
- Doctorate in Educational Development
