= Basilea Pharmaceutica =

Swiss pharmaceutical company

Basilea Pharmaceutica AG, Allschwil
- Type: Public
- Traded as: SIX: BSLN
- Industry: Pharmaceutical industry
- Founded: 2000
- Headquarters: Allschwil, Switzerland
- Key people: David Veitch (Chief Executive Officer); Domenico Scala (Chairman of the Board)
- Products: Isavuconazole, Ceftobiprole
- Revenue: CHF 157.6 million (2023)
- Number of employees: 147 (2023)
- Website: www.basilea.com

Basilea Pharmaceutica is a biopharmaceutical company based in Allschwil near Basel, Switzerland. Basilea was spun off from F. Hoffmann-La Roche in 2000 and has been listed as an independent company on the Swiss stock exchange since March 2004. The company's subsidiary is Basilea Pharmaceutica International AG, Allschwil, which is also based in Allschwil, Switzerland, and in which the company's operating activities are bundled.

== History ==
Basilea Pharmaceutica was founded in 2000 as a corporate spin-off of the pharmaceutical company Roche.

In 2002, Chinese subsidiary Basilea Pharmaceutica China Ltd. (BPC) was founded and was located in the Haimen Economic and Technological Development Zone in the city of Nantong in the Chinese province of Jiangsu, north of Shanghai.

With the listing on the Swiss stock exchange in March 2004 at a price of CHF 98 per share, Basilea realised gross proceeds of more than CHF 200 million.

In 2012, Basilea sold the worldwide rights to Toctino, a dermatology drug developed by Basilea that was approved and marketed in various European countries in 2008, to Stiefel Labs, a subsidiary of the British pharmaceutical company GlaxoSmithKline, for CHF 216 million.

At the beginning of 2013, Basilea received orphan drug status in the USA for the antifungal drug Isavuconazole for the treatment of invasive fungal infections, which at the time, analysts estimated to be worth up to CHF 150 million per year. Isavuconazole was developed in phase III in conjunction with pharmaceutical company Astellas Pharma. In March 2015, Isavuconazole was approved in the US, followed by the entire EU in October of the same year. In the following years, the drug was also approved in Japan, several Eurasian countries, Australia and China.

In October 2013, Basilea received marketing authorisation in twelve European countries, including Germany, for the distribution of the broad-spectrum antibiotic Ceftobiprole for the treatment of bacterial lung infections; in the following two years, the drug was gradually approved in other European countries and non-EU countries. Ceftobiprole has been approved in 32 countries and has been marketed in 21 countries since the end of 2023.

In 2020, Basilea sold the group headquarters in Basel to the pension fund of the Swiss bank UBS by way of a sale-leaseback and moved to its new headquarters in Allschwil in mid-2022. The gross proceeds from the sale amounted to around CHF 19 million before fees and transaction costs. In 2021, Basilea Pharmaceutica China Ltd. was sold to the US company PHT International. Basilea was previously active in oncological research, but withdrew from it at the beginning of 2022 and has since been focusing purely on anti-infectives. In 2023, Basilea acquired the rights to the antifungal drug Fosmanogepix from Pfizer.

By the end of 2023, Isavuconazole was commercialised in more than 70 countries, including the United States, most EU countries, China and Japan. Isavuconazole's total global sales in the twelve-month period between October 2022 and September 2023 amounted to CHF 406 million. This corresponds to growth of 22 per cent compared to the previous year.

In early April 2024, the US Food and Drug Administration (FDA) approved Ceftobiprole for the treatment of adults with Staphylococcus aureus bloodstream infections (bacteremia) and for adult patients with right-sided infective endocarditis. In addition, the FDA approved Ceftobiprole for the treatment of acute bacterial skin and skin structure infections in adult patients and in adult and pediatric patients aged three months to less than 18 years with community-acquired bacterial pneumonia (CAPB).

== Corporate structure ==
In the financial year 2023, Basilea Pharmaceutica AG, Allschwil generated company sales of CHF 157.6 million and employed 147 people. Since the 2022 financial year, Basilea has consistently been generating operating and net profits.

In addition to its headquarters in Allschwil, Switzerland, Basilea is represented by subsidiaries in the UK and Germany.

Basilea cooperates with licence and distribution partners in over 100 countries.

== Products ==
The company's research and development activities are focused on drugs for the treatment of severe, resistant bacterial infections and life-threatening, invasive fungal diseases.

Basilea's products are aimed at diseases that have so far been insufficiently treatable. The company markets the following products exclusively through licence and distribution partners:

Ceftobiprole (trade name Zevtera/Mabelio) is a broad-spectrum antibiotic administered intravenously for community-acquired pneumonia (CAP) and hospital-acquired pneumonia (HAP) in adults. It has an active effect against the bacterium Staphylococcus aureus (MRSA), including methicillin-resistant strains, and against penicillin-resistant Streptococcus pneumoniae (PRSP) bacteria, as well as against gram-negative pathogens such as Enterobacteriaceae.

Isavuconazole (trade name Cresemba) is an intravenous and oral antifungal agent for the treatment of patients with invasive aspergillosis and invasive mucormycosis.

While Astellas is responsible for the commercialisation of Cresemba in the USA, the pharmaceutical group Pfizer covers the commercialisation in most of Europe and also distributes Cresemba in China and the Asia–Pacific (APAC) area. Basilea's distribution partner in the MENA region is Hikma Pharmaceuticals LLC; Knight Therapeutics Inc. commercialises the antifungal Cresemba in South America.
