= Amlodipine =

Medication against high blood pressure

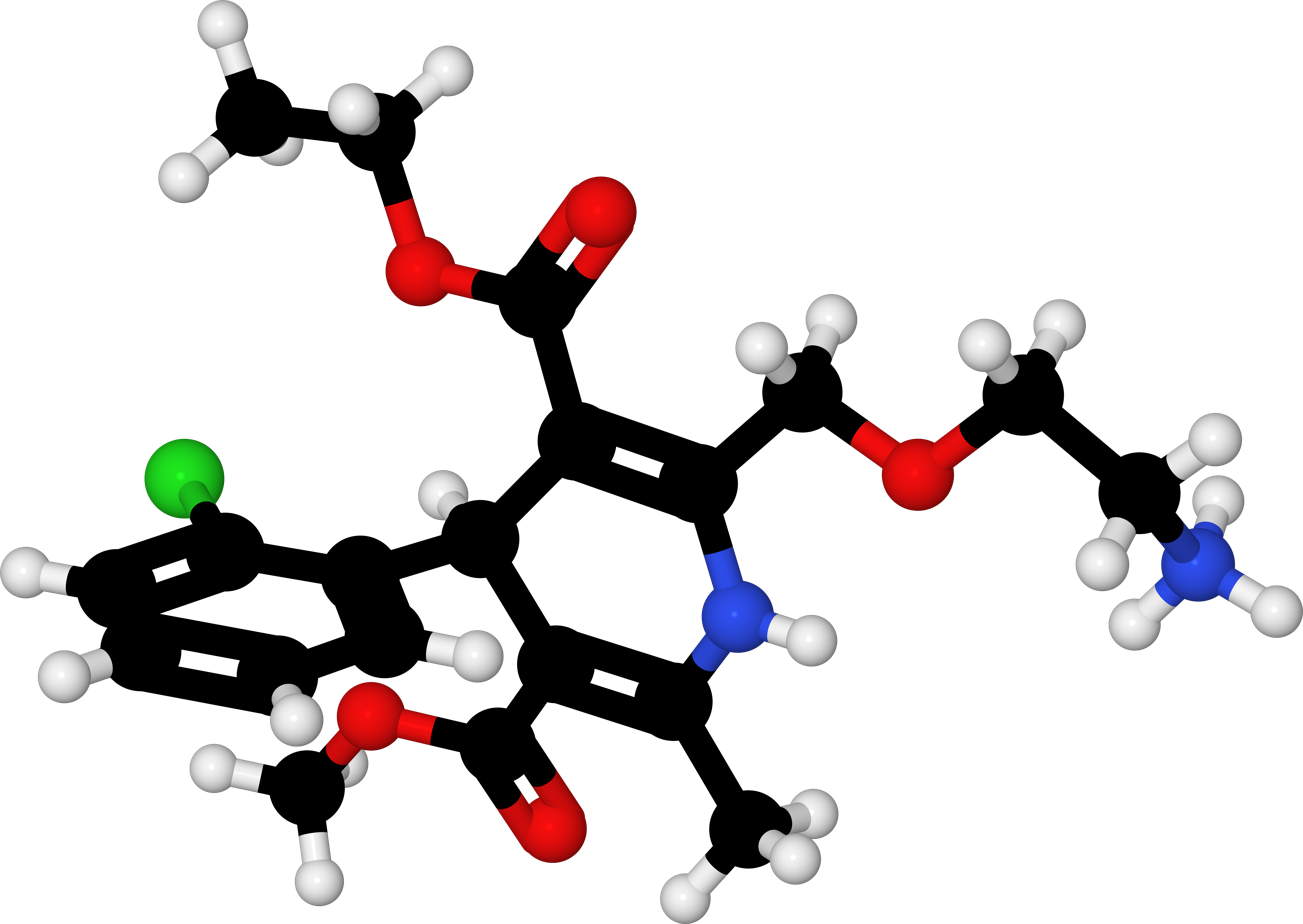

Clinical data
- Pronunciation: /æmˈloʊdɪˌpiːn/
- Trade names: Norvasc, others
- AHFS/Drugs.com: Monograph
- MedlinePlus: a692044
- License data: US DailyMed: Amlodipine
- Pregnancy category: AU: C
- Routes of administration: Oral
- Drug class: Calcium channel blocker
- ATC code: C08CA01 (WHO)

Legal status
- Legal status: AU: S4 (Prescription only); CA: ℞-only; UK: POM (Prescription only); US: ℞-only; EU: Rx-only; In general: ℞ (Prescription only)

Pharmacokinetic data
- Bioavailability: 64–90%
- Protein binding: 93%
- Metabolism: Liver
- Metabolites: Various inactive pyrimidine metabolites
- Onset of action: Highest availability 6–12 hours after oral dose
- Elimination half-life: 30–50 hours
- Duration of action: At least 24 hours
- Excretion: Urine

Identifiers
- IUPAC name: (RS)-3-ethyl 5-methyl 2-[(2-aminoethoxy)methyl]-4-(2-chlorophenyl)-6-methyl-1,4-dihydropyridine-3,5-dicarboxylate
- CAS Number: 88150-42-9
- PubChem CID: 2162
- IUPHAR/BPS: 6981
- DrugBank: DB00381
- ChemSpider: 2077
- UNII: 1J444QC288
- KEGG: D07450
- ChEBI: CHEBI:2668
- ChEMBL: ChEMBL1491
- PDB ligand: 6UB (PDBe, RCSB PDB)
- CompTox Dashboard (EPA): DTXSID7022596
- ECHA InfoCard: 100.102.428

Chemical and physical data
- Formula: C_{20}H_{25}ClN_{2}O_{5}
- Molar mass: 408.88 g·mol^{−1}
- 3D model (JSmol): Interactive image
- Chirality: Racemic mixture
- SMILES: Clc1ccccc1C2/C(C(=O)OC)=C(/C)N/C(COCCN)=C2/C(=O)OCC
- InChI: InChI=1S/C20H25ClN2O5/c1-4-28-20(25)18-15(11-27-10-9-22)23-12(2)16(19(24)26-3)17(18)13-7-5-6-8-14(13)21/h5-8,17,23H,4,9-11,22H2,1-3H3; Key:HTIQEAQVCYTUBX-UHFFFAOYSA-N

Amlodipine, sold under the brand name Norvasc among others, is a calcium channel blocker medication used to treat high blood pressure, coronary artery disease (CAD) and variant angina (also called Prinzmetal angina or coronary artery vasospasm, among other names). It is taken orally (swallowed by mouth).

Common side effects include swelling, feeling tired, abdominal pain, and nausea. Serious side effects may include low blood pressure or heart attack. Whether use is safe during pregnancy or breastfeeding is unclear. When used by people with liver problems, and in elderly individuals, doses should be reduced. Amlodipine works partly by vasodilation (relaxing the arteries and increasing their diameter). It is a long-acting calcium channel blocker of the dihydropyridine type.

Amlodipine was patented in 1982, and approved for medical use in 1990. It is on the World Health Organization's List of Essential Medicines. It is available as a generic medication. In 2024, it was the fourth most commonly prescribed medication in the United States, with more than 71 million prescriptions. In Australia, it was one of the top 10 most prescribed medications between 2017 and 2023.

== Medical uses ==
Amlodipine is used in the management of hypertension (high blood pressure) and coronary artery disease in people with either stable angina (where chest pain occurs mostly after physical or emotional stress) or vasospastic angina (where it occurs in cycles) and without heart failure. It can be used as either monotherapy or combination therapy for the management of hypertension or coronary artery disease. Amlodipine can be administered to adults and to children 6–17 years of age.

Calcium channel blockers, including amlodipine, may provide greater protection against stroke than beta blockers. Evidence from two meta-analyses has reported no significant difference between calcium channel blockers, ACE inhibitors, diuretics and angiotensin receptor blockers in stroke protection while one 2015 meta-analysis has suggested that calcium channel blockers offer greater protection against stroke than other classes of antihypertensive.

Amlodipine along with other calcium channel blockers are considered the first choice in the pharmacological management of Raynaud's phenomenon.

=== Combination therapy ===
Amlodipine can be given as a combination therapy with a variety of medications:

- Amlodipine/atorvastatin, where amlodipine is given for hypertension or CAD and atorvastatin prevents cardiovascular events, or if the person also has high cholesterol.
- Amlodipine/aliskiren or amlodipine/aliskiren/hydrochlorothiazide if amlodipine alone cannot reduce blood pressure. Aliskiren is a renin inhibitor, which works to reduce primary hypertension (that with no known cause) by binding to renin and preventing it from initiating the renin–angiotensin system (RAAS) pathway to increase blood pressure. Hydrochlorothiazide is a diuretic and decreases overall blood volume.
- Amlodipine/benazepril if either drug has failed individually, or amlodipine alone caused edema. Benazepril is an ACE inhibitor and blocks the conversion of angiotensin I to angiotensin II in the RAAS pathway.
- Amlodipine/celecoxib
- Amlodipine/lisinopril
- Amlodipine/olmesartan or amlodipine/olmesartan/hydrochlorothiazide if amlodipine is insufficient in reducing blood pressure. Olmesartan is an angiotensin II receptor antagonist and blocks part of the RAAS pathway.
- Amlodipine/perindopril if using amlodipine alone caused edema. Perindopril is a long-lasting ACE inhibitor.
- Amlodipine/telmisartan, where telmisartan is an angiotensin II receptor antagonist.
- Amlodipine/valsartan or amlodipine/valsartan/hydrochlorothiazide, where valsartan is an angiotensin II receptor antagonist.

== Contraindications ==
The only absolute contraindication to amlodipine is an allergy to amlodipine or any other dihydropyridines.

Other situations occur, however, where amlodipine generally should not be used. In patients with cardiogenic shock, where the heart's ventricles are not able to pump enough blood, calcium channel blockers exacerbate the situation by preventing the flow of calcium ions into cardiac cells, which is required for the heart to pump. While use in patients with aortic stenosis (narrowing of the aorta where it meets the left ventricle) since it does not inhibit the ventricle's function is generally safe, it can still cause collapse in cases of severe stenosis. In unstable angina (excluding variant angina), amlodipine can cause a reflex increase in cardiac contractility (how hard the ventricles squeeze) and heart rate, which together increase the demand for oxygen by the heart itself. Patients with severe hypotension can have their low blood pressure exacerbated, and patients in heart failure can get pulmonary edema. Those with impaired liver function are unable to metabolize amlodipine to its full extent, giving it a longer half-life than typical.

Amlodipine's safety in pregnancy has not been established, although reproductive toxicity at high doses is known. Whether amlodipine enters the milk of breastfeeding mothers is also unknown.Those who have heart failure, or recently had a heart attack, should take amlodipine with caution.

== Adverse effects ==
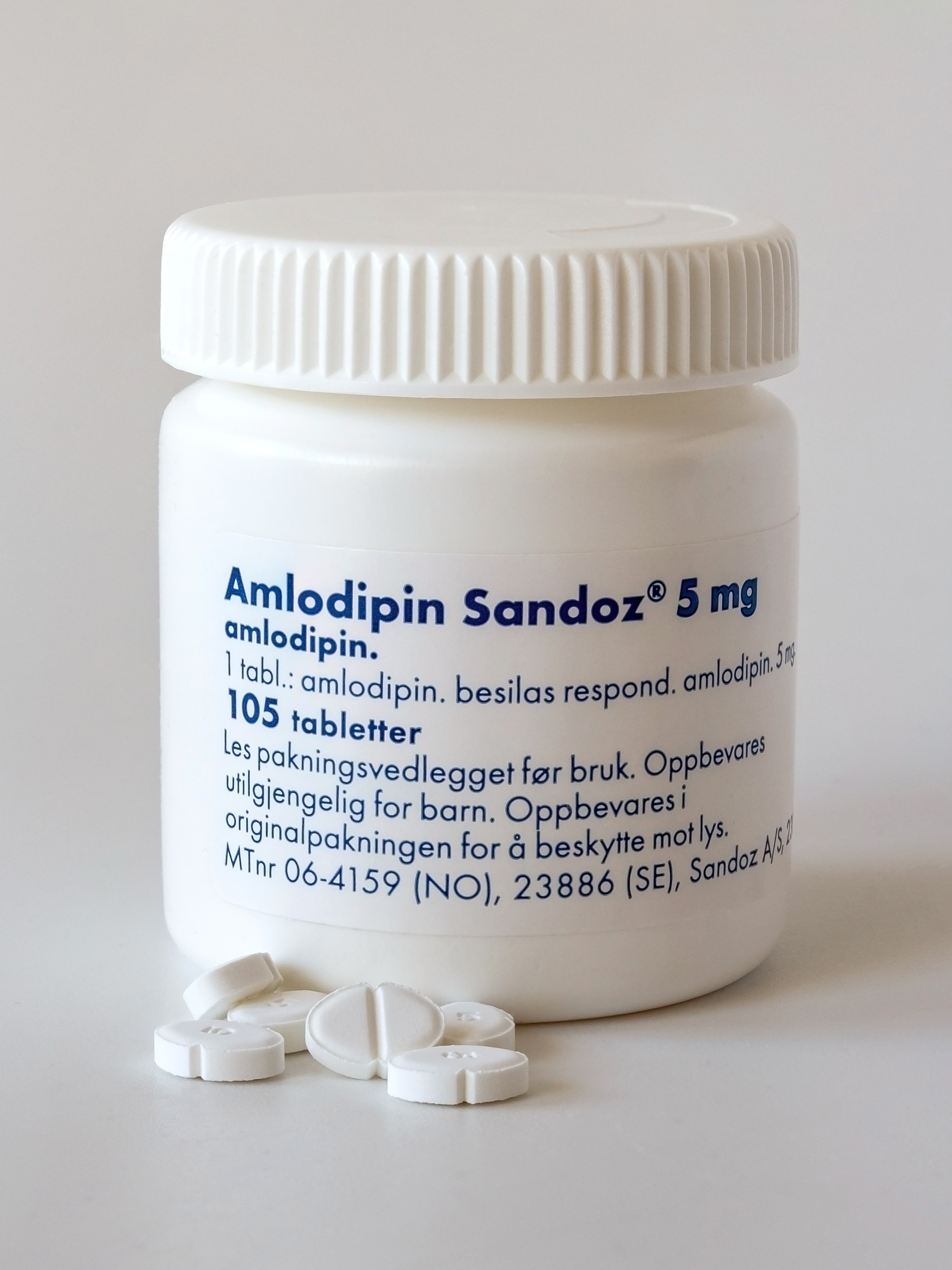
Amlodipin Sandoz, bottle and pills in Sweden

Some common dose-dependent adverse effects of amlodipine include vasodilatory effects, peripheral edema, dizziness, palpitations, and flushing. Peripheral edema (fluid accumulation in the tissues) occurs at rate of 10.8% at a 10-mg dose (versus 0.6% for placebos), and is three times more likely in women than in men. It causes more dilation in the arterioles and precapillary vessels than the postcapillary vessels and venules. The increased dilation allows for more blood, which is unable to push through to the relatively constricted postcapillary venules and vessels; the pressure causes much of the plasma to move into the interstitial space. Amlodipine-association edema can be avoided by adding ACE inhibitors or angiotensin II receptor antagonist. Of the other dose-dependent side effects, palpitations (4.5% at 10 mg vs. 0.6% in placebos) and flushing (2.6% vs. 0%) occurred more often in women; dizziness (3.4% vs. 1.5%) had no sex bias.

Common but not dose-related adverse effects are fatigue (4.5% vs. 2.8% with a placebo), nausea (2.9% vs. 1.9%), abdominal pain (1.6% vs. 0.3%), and drowsiness (1.4% vs. 0.6%). Side effects occurring less than 1% of the time include: blood disorders, impotence, depression, peripheral neuropathy, insomnia, tachycardia, gingival enlargement, hepatitis, and jaundice.

Amlodipine-associated gingival overgrowth is a relatively common side effect with exposure to amlodipine. Poor dental health and buildup of dental plaque are risk factors.

Amlodipine may increase the risk of worsening angina or acute myocardial infarction, especially in those with severe obstructive coronary artery disease, upon dosage initiation or increase. However, depending on the situation, amlodipine inhibits constriction and restores blood flow in coronary arteries as a result of its acting directly on vascular smooth muscle, causing a reduction in peripheral vascular resistance and a consequent reduction in blood pressure.

Amlodipine and other dihydropyridine calcium channel blockers are associated with primary open angle glaucoma.

== Overdose ==
Although rare, amlodipine overdose toxicity can result in widening of blood vessels, severe low blood pressure, and fast heart rate. Toxicity is generally managed with fluid replacement monitoring ECG results, vital signs, respiratory system function, glucose levels, kidney function, electrolyte levels, and urine output. Vasopressors are also administered when low blood pressure is not alleviated by fluid resuscitation.

== Interactions ==
Several drugs interact with amlodipine to increase its levels in the body. CYP3A inhibitors, by nature of inhibiting the enzyme that metabolizes amlodipine, CYP3A4, are one such class of drugs. Others include the calcium-channel blocker diltiazem, the antibiotic clarithromycin, and possibly some antifungals. Amlodipine causes several drugs to increase in levels, including cyclosporine, simvastatin, and tacrolimus (the increase in the last one being more likely in people with CYP3A5*3 genetic polymorphisms). When more than 20 mg of simvastatin, a lipid-lowering agent, are given with amlodipine, the risk of myopathy increases. The FDA issued a warning to limit simvastatin to a maximum dose of 20 mg if taken with amlodipine based on evidence from the SEARCH trial. Giving amlodipine with Viagra increases the risk of hypotension. Amlodipine also strongly inhibits CYP1A1 and CYP2B6, as well as weakly inhibits other CYP enzymes such as CYP2C9.

== Pharmacology ==
Amlodipine is a long-acting calcium channel antagonist that selectively inhibits calcium ion influx across cell membranes. It targets L-type calcium channels in muscle cells and N-type calcium channels in the central nervous system which are involved in nociceptive signalling and pain perception. Amlodipine has an inhibitory effect on calcium influx in smooth muscle cells to inhibit contraction.

Amlodipine ends up significantly reducing total vascular resistance without decreasing cardiac output expressed by pressure-rate product and cardiac contractability in comparison with verapamil, a non-dihydropyridine. In turn, following treatment lasting a month, with amlodipine, cardiac output is significantly enhanced. Unlike verapamil which has efficacy in moderation of emotional arousal and reduces cardiac load without lowering cardiac output demands, amlodipine increases the cardiac output response concomitantly with increased functional cardiac load.

=== Mechanism of action ===
Amlodipine is an angioselective calcium channel blocker and inhibits the movement of calcium ions into vascular smooth muscle cells and cardiac muscle cells which inhibits the contraction of cardiac muscle and vascular smooth muscle cells. Amlodipine inhibits calcium ion influx across cell membranes, with a greater effect on vascular smooth muscle cells. This causes vasodilation and a reduction in peripheral vascular resistance, thus lowering blood pressure. Its effects on cardiac muscle also prevent excessive constriction in the coronary arteries.

Negative inotropic effects can be detected in vitro, but such effects have not been seen in intact animals at therapeutic doses. Among the two stereoisomers [R(+), S(–)], the (–) isomer has been reported to be more active than the (+) isomer. Amlodipine does not affect serum calcium concentration. It specifically inhibits the currents of L-type Cav1.3 channels in the zona glomerulosa of the adrenal gland.

The mechanisms by which amlodipine relieves angina are:

- Stable angina: amlodipine reduces the total peripheral resistance (afterload) against which the heart works and reduces the rate pressure product, thereby lowering myocardial oxygen demand, at any given level of exercise.
- Variant angina: amlodipine blocks spasm of the coronary arteries and restores blood flow in coronary arteries and arterioles in response to calcium, potassium, epinephrine, serotonin, and thromboxane A2 analog in experimental animal models and in human coronary vessels in vitro.

Amlodipine has additionally been found to act as an antagonist of the mineralocorticoid receptor, or as an antimineralocorticoid.

=== Pharmacokinetics ===
Amlodipine and one of its major metabolites: The nitrogen-containing ring is oxidized, and two of the side chains are hydrolyzed.

Amlodipine has been studied in healthy volunteers following oral administration of ^{14}C-labelled drug. Amlodipine is well absorbed by the oral route with a mean oral bioavailability around 60%; the half-life of amlodipine is about 30 h to 50 h, and steady-state plasma concentrations are achieved after 7 to 8 days of daily dosing. In the blood it has high plasma protein binding of 97.5%. Its long half-life and high bioavailability are largely in part of its high pKa (8.6); it is ionized at physiological pH, and thus can strongly attract proteins. It is slowly metabolized in the liver by CYP3A4, with its amine group being oxidized and its side ester chain being hydrolyzed, resulting in an inactive pyridine metabolite. Renal elimination is the major route of excretion with about 60% of an administered dose recovered in urine, largely as inactive pyridine metabolites. However, renal impairment does not significantly influence amlodipine elimination. 20-25% of the drug is excreted in the faeces.

== History ==
Pfizer's patent protection on Norvasc lasted until 2007; total patent expiration occurred later in 2007. A number of generic versions are available. In the United Kingdom, tablets of amlodipine from different suppliers may contain different salts such as amlodipine besylate and amlodipine benzoate. The strength of the tablets is expressed in terms of amlodipine base, i.e., without the salts. Tablets containing different salts are therefore considered interchangeable. A fixed-dose combination of amlodipine and perindopril, an angiotensin converting enzyme inhibitor is also available.The medical form comes as besilate, mesylate, or maleate.

== Society and culture ==
=== Brand names ===
In the US, Norvasc is marketed by Viatris after Upjohn was spun off from Pfizer.

== Veterinary use ==
Amlodipine is most often used to treat systemic hypertension in both cats and dogs. In cats, it is the first line of treatment due to its efficacy and few side effects. Systemic hypertension in cats is usually secondary to another abnormality, such as chronic kidney disease, and so amlodipine is most often administered to cats with kidney disease. While amlodipine is used in dogs with systemic hypertension, it is not as efficacious. Amlodipine is also used to treat congestive heart failure due to mitral valve regurgitation in dogs. By decreasing resistance to forward flow in the systemic circulation it results in a decrease in regurgitant flow into the left atrium. Similarly, it can be used on dogs and cats with left-to-right shunting lesions such as ventricular septal defect to reduce the shunt. Side effects are rare in cats. In dogs, the primary side effect is gingival hyperplasia.
