= KYTT-FM =

- Coos Bay, Oregon; United States
- Frequency: 98.7 MHz
- Branding: K-Light

Programming
- Format: Christian radio

Ownership
- Owner: Lighthouse Radio Group

History
- First air date: November 19, 1978 (as KICR at 98.3)
- Former call signs: KICR (1978–1983)
- Former frequencies: 98.3 MHz (1978–1983)

Technical information
- Licensing authority: FCC
- Facility ID: 29596
- Class: C2
- ERP: 13,000 watts
- HAAT: 293 meters (961 ft)
- Transmitter coordinates: 43°27′49″N 124°5′44″W

Links
- Public license information: Public file; LMS
- Webcast: Listen Live
- Website: lighthouseradio.com

KYTT (K-Light 98.7 FM) is a Christian radio station licensed to Coos Bay, Oregon. The station is owned by Lighthouse Radio Group.

== Programming ==
KYTT's programming primarily includes Contemporary Christian Music, with some Christian talk and teaching programs. Christian talk and teaching shows heard on KYTT include; Turning Point with David Jeremiah, Revive our Hearts with Nancy Leigh DeMoss, Focus On The Family, and Unshackled!.

== History ==
The station began broadcasting November 19, 1978, and held the call sign KICR. The station originally broadcast at 98.3 MHz, and was owned by Intercontinental Ministries. The station aired a format consisting of religious programming, beautiful music, and classical music. In 1983, the station's call sign was changed to KYTT-FM. By 1984, the station was airing entirely religious programming. By 1985, the station's frequency had been changed to 98.7 MHz.
