= WHMG-LP =

Radio station in Purgitsville, West Virginia

- Purgitsville, West Virginia; United States
- Broadcast area: Purgitsville, West Virginia
- Frequency: 98.7 MHz
- Branding: Catholic Radio WHMG

Programming
- Format: Catholic Religious
- Affiliations: EWTN Radio Network

Ownership
- Owner: Holy Spirit Study Institute, Ltd.

History
- First air date: 2003

Technical information
- Licensing authority: FCC
- Facility ID: 134476
- Class: L1
- ERP: 100 watts
- HAAT: -14 meters
- Transmitter coordinates: 39°15′49.0″N 78°54′18.0″W

Links
- Public license information: LMS

WHMG-LP (98.7 FM) was a Catholic religious formatted broadcast radio station licensed to and serving Purgitsville, West Virginia. WHMG-LP was last owned and operated by Holy Spirit Study Institute, Ltd.
