= XHBAK-FM =

Indigenous radio station in Bachajón, Chilón, Chiapas

- Bachajón, Chilón, Chiapas; Mexico
- Frequency: 98.7 MHz
- Branding: Radio Ach' Lequilc'op

Programming
- Format: Community radio

Ownership
- Owner: Comunidad Indígena Tseltal Asentada en la Localidad de Bachajón; (Comunicación Educativa y Cultural Bats'il K'op, A.C.)

History
- First air date: March 21, 2015
- Call sign meaning: BAts'il K'op

Technical information
- ERP: .997 kW

Links
- Website: achlequilcop.org

XHBAK-FM is a radio station in Bachajón, Chilón, Chiapas in Mexico. It broadcasts on 98.7 FM and is known as Radio Ach' Lequilc'op, broadcasting programs principally in Tzeltal to serve the local Mayan indigenous community.

== History ==
The station launched on March 21, 2015, after receiving its permit in September 2014. It was originally held by a civil association, Comunicación Educativa y Cultural Bats'il K'op, A.C. In February 2017, in order to transition the station to a social indigenous concession, the station was transferred to direct control by the indigenous community.
