= CKRW-FM =

Radio station in Whitehorse, Yukon, Canada

Coordinates: 60°39′28″N 134°53′11″W

- Whitehorse, Yukon; Canada
- Broadcast area: Yukon
- Frequency: 96.1 MHz (FM)
- Branding: 96.1 The Rush

Programming
- Format: Hot adult contemporary
- Affiliations: Premiere Networks

Ownership
- Owner: Klondike Broadcasting

History
- First air date: November 17, 1969
- Former frequencies: 610 kHz (1969–2004 primary, 2004–2017? simulcast)
- Call sign meaning: Radio Whitehorse

Technical information
- Class: B1
- ERP: vertical polarization only: 4,400 watts
- HAAT: 364 metres (1,194 ft)

Links
- Website: ckrw.com

CKRW-FM (96.1 The Rush) is a hot adult contemporary radio station in Whitehorse, Yukon, Canada.

== History ==
Its first transmission was on 17 November 1969 at 6:00 a.m.; it began simulcasting on AM and FM on September 14, 2004 at 610 kHz and 96.1 MHz. The FM station was considered the primary signal by the Canadian Radio-television and Telecommunications Commission, although unlike most AM to FM conversions the station retained its AM transmitter in order to serve listeners who were unable to receive the FM signal due to the Whitehorse area's mountainous terrain. However, as of 2017 the AM transmitter is off the air, and with a defective transmitter and a previously damaged and unrepairable radio tower at hand, it is unlikely that CKRW will restore the AM service.

CKRW's programming is also transmitted into other Yukon communities, including Watson Lake, Haines Junction, Faro, Mayo and Teslin. CKRW is also rebroadcast on CFYT-FM in Dawson City when that station is not originating its own programming.

From 1982 to 1989, CKRW affiliated with CKO, carrying correspondent reports from that all-news network as part of its local newscasts. The affiliation ended when CKO left the air.

The Shaw Direct direct broadcast satellite service carries CKRW on channel 856, and the NorthWesTel television service in Whitehorse carries CKRW on channel 8.

== Transmitters ==
Rebroadcasters of CKRW-FM
| City of licence | Identifier | Frequency | Power | Class | RECNet | CRTC Decision |
|---|---|---|---|---|---|---|
| Carmacks | VF2267 | 98.7 FM | 10 watts | LP | Query | 94-246 |
| Faro | VF2063 | 98.7 FM | 12 watts | LP | Query | 89-214 |
| Haines Junction | VF2269 | 98.7 FM | 10 watts | LP | Query | |
| Mayo | VF2268 | 98.7 FM | 10 watts | LP | Query | |
| Old Crow | CKRF-FM | 88.9 FM | 1 watt | D | Query | |
| Teslin | VF2270 | 98.7 FM | 10 watts | LP | Query | |
| Watson Lake | VF2143 | 98.7 FM | 10 watts | LP | Query | 92-4 |
| Atlin, British Columbia | CKRW-FM-1 | 98.7 FM | 36 watts | LP | Query | |
| Inuvik, Northwest Territories | CKRW-FM-2 | 98.7 FM | 44 watts | LP | Query | 2010-609 |

Some CKRW programming can also be heard on CFYT-FM in Dawson City which repeats CKRW during hours that local programming is not broadcast.

On April 5, 2017, the CRTC approved the application by Klondike Broadcasting Company Limited to amend the broadcasting licence for the English-language commercial AM radio programming undertaking CKRW Whitehorse, Yukon Territory, in order to authorize the station to originate programming from its rebroadcasting transmitter CKRW-FM Whitehorse under its existing technical parameters until 5 April 2018.

On June 29, 2017, Klondike Broadcasting Company Limited (Klondike) submitted an application to operate an English-language commercial FM radio station in Whitehorse to replace its commercial AM radio station CKRW Whitehorse. The station would operate at 96.1 MHz (channel 241B) with an effective radiated power of 4,400 watts (non-directional antenna with an effective height of antenna above average terrain of 359 metres). The CRTC approved Klondike Broadcasting Company Limited (Klondike's) application to convert CKRW from the AM band to the FM band on January 4, 2018.
