= KNVU-LP =

- Victorville, California; United States
- Frequency: 98.7 MHz

Programming
- Language: Spanish
- Format: Christian radio

Ownership
- Owner: Centro Internacional de Oracion

History
- First air date: November 21, 2014

Technical information
- Licensing authority: FCC
- Facility ID: 197391
- Class: L1
- ERP: 1 watt
- HAAT: 428 meters (1,404 ft)
- Transmitter coordinates: 34°36′44″N 117°17′29″W}}

Links
- Public license information: LMS

KNVU-LP is a low power radio station that broadcasts a Spanish language religious format licensed to Victorville, California.

== History ==
KNVU-LP began broadcasting on November 21, 2014.
