= Olmesartan =

Angiotensin II receptor antagonist

Clinical data
- Trade names: Benicar
- Other names: Olmesartan medoxomil
- AHFS/Drugs.com: Monograph
- MedlinePlus: a603006
- License data: US DailyMed: Olmesartan
- Routes of administration: Oral
- ATC code: C09CA08 (WHO) C09DA08 (WHO) (with diuretics) C09DB02 (WHO) (with amlodipine)

Legal status
- Legal status: US: ℞-only; In general: ℞ (Prescription only)

Pharmacokinetic data
- Bioavailability: 26%
- Metabolism: Liver (cannot be removed by hemodialysis)
- Elimination half-life: 13 hours
- Excretion: Kidney 40%, bile duct 60%

Identifiers
- IUPAC name: (5-methyl-2-oxo-2H-1,3-dioxol-4-yl)methyl 4-(2-hydroxypropan-2-yl)-2-propyl-1-({4-[2-(2H-1,2,3,4-tetrazol-5-yl)phenyl]phenyl}methyl)-1H-imidazole-5-carboxylate
- CAS Number: 144689-63-4
- PubChem CID: 130881
- IUPHAR/BPS: 591
- DrugBank: DB00275
- ChemSpider: 115748
- UNII: 6M97XTV3HD
- KEGG: D01204
- ChEBI: CHEBI:31932
- ChEMBL: ChEMBL1200692
- CompTox Dashboard (EPA): DTXSID2040571
- ECHA InfoCard: 100.174.243

Chemical and physical data
- Formula: C_{29}H_{30}N_{6}O_{6}
- Molar mass: 558.595 g·mol^{−1}
- 3D model (JSmol): Interactive image
- SMILES: CCCc1nc(c(n1Cc2ccc(cc2)c3ccccc3c4[nH]nnn4)C(=O)OCc5c(oc(=O)o5)C)C(C)(C)O
- InChI: InChI=1S/C29H30N6O6/c1-5-8-23-30-25(29(3,4)38)24(27(36)39-16-22-17(2)40-28(37)41-22)35(23)15-18-11-13-19(14-12-18)20-9-6-7-10-21(20)26-31-33-34-32-26/h6-7,9-14,38H,5,8,15-16H2,1-4H3,(H,31,32,33,34); Key:UQGKUQLKSCSZGY-UHFFFAOYSA-N

Olmesartan, sold under the brand name Benicar among others, is a medication used to treat high blood pressure (hypertension). It is taken orally (swallowed by mouth). Versions are available as the combination olmesartan/hydrochlorothiazide and olmesartan/amlodipine. It is available as a prodrug, olmesartan medoxomil.

Common side effects include dizziness, headaches, diarrhea, and back pain. Serious side effects may include kidney problems, low blood pressure, and angioedema. Use in pregnancy may harm the fetus and use when breastfeeding is not recommended. It is an angiotensin II receptor antagonist and works by blocking the effects of angiotensin II.

It was patented in 1991 and came into medical use in 2002. It is available as a generic medication. In 2023, it was the 96th most commonly prescribed medication in the United States, with more than 7 million prescriptions.

== Medical uses ==
In the United States, olmesartan is indicated for the treatment of hypertension in people aged six years of age and older to lower blood pressure.

Olmesartan is used for the treatment of hypertension. It may be used alone or in combination with other antihypertensive agents.

== Contraindications ==
Contraindications for treatment with olmesartan include biliary obstruction. Another major contraindication is pregnancy; reports in the scientific literature reveal fetal malformations for pregnant women taking sartan-derived drugs.

== Adverse effects ==
The US Food and Drug Administration (FDA) has determined that the benefits of olmesartan continue to outweigh its potential risks when used for the treatment of people with high blood pressure according to the drug label.

The incidence of adverse effects with olmesartan is reported as similar to placebo; the only adverse effect that occurred in >1% of patients treated with it and more frequently than placebo was dizziness (3% vs 1%). Rarely, olmesartan can cause severe gastrointestinal issues called olmesartan-induced enteropathy. The symptoms, which include nausea, vomiting, diarrhea, weight loss, and electrolyte abnormalities, are common among those who have celiac disease. Recent studies suggested this form of sprue-like enteropathy could be caused by the inhibition of TGF-β, a polypeptide cytokine that maintains intestinal homeostasis. However, it is still unclear why this action was never observed with other ARBs. In studies of angiotensin II receptor antagonists such as olmesartan, patients with unilateral or bilateral renal artery stenosis have been reported to have increases in serum creatinine or blood urea nitrogen. There has been no long-term use of olmesartan medoxomil in patients with unilateral or bilateral renal artery stenosis, but similar results may be expected.

== Chemistry ==
Olmesartan medoxomil, the prodrug.

Olmesartan medoxomil, a medoxomil ester prodrug, is completely and rapidly hydrolyzed to its active acid form, olmesartan.

Olmesartan medoxomil metabolism.

== History ==
It was patented in 1991 and came into medical use in 2002.

== Society and culture ==
=== Brand names ===
Olmesartan and Sevikar HCT combined is marketed worldwide by Daiichi Sankyo, in India by Abbott Healthcare Pvt. Ltd. under the trade name WinBP, by Zydus Cadila under the trade name Olmy, by Ranbaxy Laboratories Ltd. under the trade name Olvance, Olsar by Unichem Laboratories and in Canada by Schering-Plough as Olmetec. The marketing rights to the brand names Benicar, Benicar HCT, Azor, and Tribenzor in the United States were transferred from Daiichi Sankyo to Cosette in January 2022.

Several preparations containing olmesartan and other antihypertensives are available. Teva Pharmaceuticals produces a formulation containing olmesartan, amlodipine, and hydrochlorothiazide. Benicar HCT is the brand name of a medication containing olmesartan medoxomil with hydrochlorothiazide. Benitec H, another medication containing olmesartan medoxomil and hydrochlorothiazide, is marketed by GlaxoSmithKline in India.

== Research ==
Olmesartan has demonstrated potential benefits in reducing the progression of atherosclerotic buildup in arteries. In large randomized placebo-controlled or active drug-controlled studies conducted in participants with hypertension, stable angina, or type 2 diabetes, long-term treatment with olmesartan has been shown to reduce the levels of markers of vascular inflammation. This effect was also observed in a high-cholesterol primate test model.
