= Amlodipine/olmesartan =

Combination antihypertensive drug

Combination of
- Amlodipine: Calcium channel blocker
- Olmesartan: Angiotensin II antagonist

Clinical data
- Trade names: Azor, Sevikar
- Other names: Olmesartan/amlodipine
- AHFS/Drugs.com: Micromedex Detailed Consumer Information
- License data: US DailyMed: Amlodipine and olmesartan
- Pregnancy category: AU: D
- Routes of administration: By mouth
- ATC code: C09DB02 (WHO)

Legal status
- Legal status: AU: S4 (Prescription only); UK: POM (Prescription only); US: ℞-only

Identifiers
- CAS Number: 28981-97-7
- KEGG: D10285

Amlodipine/olmesartan, sold under the brand name Azor, among others is a fixed-dose combination medication used to treat high blood pressure. It contains amlodipine, as the besilate, a dihydropyridine calcium channel blocker, and olmesartan medoxomil, an angiotensin II receptor blocker.

Amlodipine/olmesartan was approved for medical use in the United States in September 2007. It is available as a generic medication.

== Medical uses ==
The combination is indicated for the treatment of hypertension, alone or with other antihypertensive agents, to lower blood pressure.

== History ==
The combination has been studied in clinical trials; one test showed it reduced blood pressure during a 24-hour period and was well tolerated.
