= XHUAL-FM =

Radio station of the Universidad Autónoma de La Laguna in Torreón, Coahuila

- Torreón, Coahuila; Mexico
- Broadcast area: Comarca Lagunera
- Frequency: 98.7 MHz
- Branding: Frecuencia UAL

Programming
- Format: University radio

Ownership
- Owner: Universidad Autónoma de la Laguna

History
- First air date: 2005
- Call sign meaning: Universidad Autónoma de La Laguna

Technical information
- Licensing authority: CRT
- Class: A
- ERP: 2.926 kW
- HAAT: 9.5 m (31 ft)

Links
- Website: web.archive.org/web/20131024033908/http://www.frecuencia.ual.mx/

XHUAL-FM is a radio station serving Torreón, Coahuila owned by the Universidad Autónoma de La Laguna. It is branded as Frecuencia UAL and broadcasts on 98.7 FM from its campus.

XHUAL was the first of the four university radio stations that currently serve the Comarca Lagunera, receiving its permit in 2005.
