= Enalaprilat =

Active metabolite of the drug enalapril

Clinical data
- AHFS/Drugs.com: Monograph
- License data: US FDA: Enalaprilat

Identifiers
- IUPAC name: (2S)-1-[(2S)-2-{[(1S)-1-carboxy-3-phenylpropyl]amino}propanoyl]pyrrolidine-2-carboxylic acid
- CAS Number: 84680-54-6; anhydrous: 76420-72-9
- IUPHAR/BPS: 6332
- ChemSpider: 4575429
- UNII: GV0O7ES0R3; anhydrous: Q508Q118JM
- KEGG: D03769
- ChEBI: CHEBI:4786
- ChEMBL: ChEMBL577
- CompTox Dashboard (EPA): DTXSID0048975
- ECHA InfoCard: 100.071.306

Chemical and physical data
- Formula: C_{18}H_{24}N_{2}O_{5}
- Molar mass: 348.399 g·mol^{−1}
- 3D model (JSmol): Interactive image
- SMILES: C[C@H](N[C@@H](CCc1ccccc1)C(=O)O)C(=O)N2CCC[C@H]2C(=O)O
- InChI: InChI=1S/C18H24N2O5/c1-12(16(21)20-11-5-8-15(20)18(24)25)19-14(17(22)23)10-9-13-6-3-2-4-7-13/h2-4,6-7,12,14-15,19H,5,8-11H2,1H3,(H,22,23)(H,24,25)/t12-,14-,15-/m0/s1; Key:LZFZMUMEGBBDTC-QEJZJMRPSA-N

Enalaprilat is the active metabolite of enalapril. It is the first dicarboxylate-containing ACE inhibitor and was developed partly to overcome these limitations of captopril. The thiol functional group of captopril was replaced with a carboxylic acid group, but additional modifications were required to achieve a potency similar to captopril.

Enalaprilat, however, had a problem of its own. The consequence of the structural modifications was that its ionisation characteristics do not allow for sufficient GI absorption. Thus, enalaprilat was only suitable for intravenous administration. This was overcome by the monoesterification of enalaprilat with ethanol to produce enalapril.

As a prodrug, enalapril is hydrolyzed in vivo to the active form enalaprilat by various esterases. Peak plasma enalaprilat concentrations occur 2 to 4 hours after oral enalapril administration. Elimination thereafter is biphasic, with an initial phase which reflects renal filtration (elimination half-life 2 to 6 hours) and a subsequent prolonged phase (elimination half-life 36 hours), the latter representing equilibration of drug from tissue distribution sites.

The prolonged phase does not contribute to drug accumulation on repeated administration but is thought to be of pharmacological significance in mediating drug effects. Renal impairment [particularly creatinine clearance <20 mL/min (<1.2 L/h)] results in significant accumulation of enalaprilat and necessitates dosage reduction. Accumulation is probably the cause of reduced elimination in healthy elderly individuals and in patients with concomitant diabetes, hypertension and heart failure.
