= WLCD-LP =

Radio station at Lane College in Jackson, Tennessee

- Jackson, Tennessee; United States
- Frequency: 98.7 MHz
- Branding: The Dragon

Programming
- Format: Urban Oldies

Ownership
- Owner: Lane College

History
- First air date: 2005
- Former call signs: WJKR-LP (2005–2007)

Technical information
- Licensing authority: FCC
- Facility ID: 134022
- Class: L1
- ERP: 100 watts
- HAAT: 22.8 meters (75 ft)
- Transmitter coordinates: 35°36′45.00″N 88°48′55.00″W

Links
- Public license information: LMS
- Webcast: Listen live
- Website: WLCD-LP Website

WLCD-LP (98.7 FM, "The Dragon") is a radio station broadcasting an Urban Oldies music format. Licensed to Jackson, Tennessee, United States, the station is owned by Lane College.
