= XHNLT-FM =

Radio Fórmula station in Nuevo Laredo, Tamaulipas

- Nuevo Laredo, Tamaulipas; Mexico
- Broadcast area: Nuevo Laredo, Tamaulipas; Laredo, Texas
- Frequency: 96.1 MHz (HD Radio)
- Branding: Radio Fórmula

Programming
- Format: Talk radio
- Subchannels: HD2: Radio Fórmula Segunda Cadena; HD3: Trión

Ownership
- Owner: Grupo Fórmula; (Radio Fórmula del Norte, S.A. de C.V.)
- Operator: Noe Cuéllar

History
- First air date: May 22, 1985 (concession); March 5, 2018 (FM)
- Former call signs: XENLT-AM (1985–2019)
- Former frequencies: 1000 kHz (1985–2019)
- Call sign meaning: Nuevo Laredo Tamaulipas

Technical information
- Licensing authority: CRT
- Class: A
- ERP: 3,000 watts
- HAAT: 35.3 m (116 ft)
- Transmitter coordinates: 27°28′27″N 99°30′48″W

Links
- Website: Grupo Fórmula website

XHNLT-FM (96.1 MHz) is a radio station that serves the border area of Laredo, Texas, United States, and Nuevo Laredo, Tamaulipas, Mexico. It is owned and operated by Radio Fórmula.

XHNLT-FM broadcasts in HD.

== History ==
Former logo when broadcasting on 1000

XENLT-AM 1000 received its concession on May 22, 1985. It was owned by Radio Mil del Norte, S.A. de C.V. and was a daytime broadcaster with 1,000 watts. Radio Fórmula acquired it in 1997 and increased power in 1998, adding a night time service at 100 watts.

The concessionaire changed from Radio Fórmula del Norte to Radio Transmisora del Pacífico in 2016.

In 2017, XENLT was granted an AM-FM migration as XHNLT-FM on 96.1 MHz. XHNLT signed on at 2:07 pm on March 5, 2018, and formally began operations on April 23. The FM station offers three total subchannels, including the national Segunda Cadena feed and the Trión musical format. XENLT-AM shut down April 23, 2019, after the required year of simulcasting.
