= WLCZ =

- Lincolnton, Georgia; United States
- Frequency: 98.7 MHz
- Branding: WLCZ 98.7FM

Programming
- Format: Gospel/Inspirational

Ownership
- Owner: Glory Communications, Inc.

Technical information
- Licensing authority: FCC
- Facility ID: 171006
- Class: A
- ERP: 480 watts
- HAAT: 129.7 metres (426 ft)
- Transmitter coordinates: 33°44′32″N 82°31′17″W

Links
- Public license information: Public file; LMS
- Website: Official Website

WLCZ (98.7 FM) is a Christian radio station licensed to serve the community of Lincolnton, Georgia. The station is owned by Glory Communications, Inc., and airs a gospel/inspirational music format.

The station was assigned the WLCZ call letters by the Federal Communications Commission on February 13, 2012.
