= KZAM (FM) =

- Pleasant Valley, Texas; United States
- Broadcast area: Wichita Falls, Texas
- Frequency: 98.7 MHz
- Branding: La Mejor

Programming
- Format: Regional Mexican

Ownership
- Owner: Mekaddesh Group Corporation

Technical information
- Licensing authority: FCC
- Facility ID: 164195
- Class: A
- ERP: 6,000 watts
- HAAT: 97 meters (318 ft)
- Transmitter coordinates: 34°02′54″N 98°39′38″W

Links
- Public license information: Public file; LMS
- Webcast: Listen Live
- Website: mejorfm.com

KZAM (98.7 MHz) is a FM radio station licensed to Pleasant Valley, Texas. The station airs a Regional Mexican format.
