= CICV-FM =

Former community radio station in Lake Cowichan, British Columbia

Coordinates: 48°49′25″N 124°03′17″W

- Lake Cowichan, British Columbia; Canada
- Frequency: 98.7 MHz
- Branding: Cowichan Valley Community Radio

Programming
- Format: community radio

Ownership
- Owner: Cowichan Valley Community Radio Society

History
- First air date: August 2009
- Last air date: December 2017
- Call sign meaning: Cowichan Valley

Technical information
- Class: LP
- ERP: 50 watts
- HAAT: −84 meters (−276 ft)

Links
- Website: www.cicv.ca

CICV-FM was a community radio station that used to broadcast on the frequency 98.7 FM in Lake Cowichan, British Columbia, Canada.

Owned by Cowichan Valley Community Radio Society, the station was licensed by the CRTC on April 15, 2009.

The station signed on in August 2009.

On August 9, 2012, Cowichan Valley Community Radio Society received approval from the CRTC to operate a new low-power FM radio station at Lake Cowichan. The new station would operate at 97.5 MHz with 5 watts. On December 31, 2017, CICV-FM closed its doors due to financial hardship and lack of volunteer support in the community.
