= DWUB =

Radio station in Baguio, Philippines

Z Radio (DWUB)
- Baguio; Philippines
- Broadcast area: Benguet, La Union and surrounding areas
- Frequency: 98.7 MHz
- Branding: Z Radio 98.7

Programming
- Languages: Ilocano, Filipino
- Format: Contemporary MOR, OPM, Talk

Ownership
- Owner: Sphere Entertainment

History
- First air date: November 6, 2006
- Call sign meaning: University of Baguio

Technical information
- Licensing authority: NTC
- Power: 5,000 watts
- ERP: 10,000 watts

DWUB (98.7 FM), broadcasting as Z Radio 98.7, is a radio station owned and operated by Sphere Entertainment (formerly known as Benguet Broadcasting Corporation). The station's studio, offices and transmitter are located at the AMS Bldg., University of Baguio, Gen. Luna Rd., Baguio.

== History ==
Z Radio was established in November 2006 as a radio outlet of the University of Baguio. A few years later, it enhanced its programming to serve the public outside the campus. It aired talk programming in the morning and Top 40 format throughout the rest of the day. In 2019, it switched to a mass-based format.
