= KDIV-LP =

- Fayetteville, Arkansas; United States
- Frequency: 98.7 MHz
- Branding: KDIV 98.7

Programming
- Format: Urban Contemporary/Community Radio

Ownership
- Owner: Voice Of Diversity

History
- Call sign meaning: K DIVersity

Technical information
- Licensing authority: FCC
- Facility ID: 196533
- ERP: 100 watts

Links
- Public license information: LMS
- Website: voiceofdiversity.org/radio/

KDIV-LP (98.7 FM) is an urban contemporary/community radio formatted radio station. The station is licensed to serve the Fayetteville, Arkansas area. The station is owned by Voice Of Diversity and was assigned the KDIV-LP call letters by the Federal Communications Commission.
