= WQME =

Coordinates: 39.983°N 85.711°W

Anderson, Indiana; United States
- Broadcast area: Indianapolis, Indiana; Muncie, Indiana
- Frequency: 98.7 MHz
- Branding: Air1

Programming
- Format: Christian Worship
- Affiliations: Air1

Ownership
- Owner: Educational Media Foundation

History
- First air date: November 30, 1990

Technical information
- Licensing authority: FCC
- Facility ID: 2216
- Class: A
- ERP: 4,500 watts
- HAAT: 117 meters (384 ft)
- Translator: W287BE 105.3 FM (Greenwood)

Links
- Public license information: Public file; LMS
- Webcast: Listen Live
- Website: Air1.com

WQME (98.7 FM) is a non-commercial radio station licensed to Anderson, Indiana, United States, serving the Indianapolis and Muncie media markets. Owned by the Educational Media Foundation, the station broadcasts EMF's Air1 network, playing Christian worship music. Listener donations support the station's expenses.

Previous logo for WQME

WQME previously aired a locally programmed Christian adult contemporary format branded as 98.7 The Song. In December 2017, Anderson University, the owner, announced its intent to sell WQME.

On May 31, 2018, the station ceased local programming, switching to the Educational Media Foundation's Air1 network. The university formally sold WQME to EMF outright on October 31, 2018. The sale was completed on November 30.

On January 1, 2019, Air1 switched from its longtime Christian CHR/Top 40 format to a Christian worship format.
