= WBTY =

- Homerville, Georgia; United States
- Frequency: 98.7 MHz

Programming
- Format: Classic hits
- Affiliations: CNN Radio, Westwood One

Ownership
- Owner: Southern Broadcasting & Investment Co., Inc.

History
- First air date: December 1980

Technical information
- Licensing authority: FCC
- Facility ID: 61255
- Class: A
- ERP: 6,000 watts
- HAAT: 91 meters
- Transmitter coordinates: 31°2′4.00″N 82°51′50.00″W

Links
- Public license information: Public file; LMS

WBTY (98.7 FM) is a radio station broadcasting a classic hits format. It is licensed to Homerville, Georgia, United States. It is currently owned by Southern Broadcasting & Investment Co., Inc. and features programming from CNN Radio and Westwood One.
