= KGPS-LP =

- Kingman, Arizona; United States
- Frequency: 98.7 MHz

Programming
- Format: Religious

Ownership
- Owner: Calvary Chapel of Kingman

History
- First air date: 2008

Technical information
- Licensing authority: FCC
- Facility ID: 134768
- Class: L1
- ERP: 100 watts
- HAAT: -19.9 meters
- Transmitter coordinates: 35°15′23″N 113°59′38″W

Links
- Public license information: LMS
- Webcast: Listen Live
- Website: www.kgps.org

KGPS-LP (98.7 FM) is a radio station licensed to serve Kingman, Arizona. The station is owned by Calvary Chapel of Kingman. It airs a religious radio format.

The station was assigned the KGPS-LP call letters by the Federal Communications Commission on March 2, 2006.
