= RPP FM =

- Mornington, Victoria; Australia
- Broadcast area: Mornington Peninsula
- Frequency: 98.7 MHz
- Branding: RPP FM

Programming
- Format: Community

Ownership
- Owner: Radio Port Phillip Association Inc

History
- First air date: 1984
- Former frequencies: 94.3 MHz (1987–1988)
- Call sign meaning: 3Radio Port Phillip

Technical information
- Power: 800 watts
- Transmitter coordinates: 38.2313°S 145.0405°E
- Repeater: 98.3 MHz Frankston

Links
- Website: rppfm.com.au

RPP FM is a community radio station in the Mornington Peninsula region of Victoria, Australia. The radio station was established in 1984 to provide a local community radio service to the region.

== History ==
RPP FM (Formally 3RPP) was initially based at studios located in Octavia Street, Mornington. The building was a former Telecom Australia exchange building, and was located in the centre of a carpark adjoining the nearby Mornington Main Street Shopping Centre.

Initially, 3RPP was licensed to commence services on frequency 94.3 MHz. There were a wide range of programs on 3RPP including specialist music programs, and regular daily breakfast programs and other popular programming including broadcasts from the still operating 21st Century Dance Club in Frankston.

The logo has taken two forms since commencement of services, the first with "94.3 3RPP" in blue Greek-styled characters on a white background, with the second being adopted upon the station's relocation to 98.7 MHz. The logo is described as a yacht sailing in a bay or inlet with sea-gulls above. This logo has been in use for well over 15 years by the radio station.

=== Frequency and translators ===
The main transmission frequency in the Mornington Peninsula, from a site at Arthurs Seat is 98.7 MHz (800 W), however an additional frequency was allocated in the Frankston City area on 98.3 MHz (10 W) to allow for reception in an otherwise blackspot area. 3RPP however promotes both frequencies with equal prominence on its website, despite the limited coverage provided by the 98.3 Repeater.

=== Relocation ===
The radio station was required to move from its Mornington location due to the extensions of the car park and the sale of their building to developers.

The new studio location at the then "Moorooduc Coolstores" provided a stable location for 3RPP's operations until 2011. However, with the planned redevelopment of the Moorooduc Coolstores property, 3RPP committed to relocate to a new broadcast studio location with their lease ending in late 2010, following approaches to both Frankston Council and Mornington Peninsula Shire Council (MPSC) who were both supportive. The RPP-FM Board met on 26 February 2010 and agreed to accept the offer from MPSC to relocate to Mornington with the building to be renovated into a purpose-built facility at the remaining wing of the former Mornington High School site in Wilsons Road, Mornington. Work started in March 2010 by the MPSC and Rotary to undertake site preparation in cleaning and restricting access by generations of pigeons who called the building home, along with scoping the project and development of plans for planning permit approval.

The new RPP-FM facility is located at the northern end of what was the old Science Wing of the former High School and was renovated using a Community development model developed by MPSC which included a commercial builder, MPSC Officers and Councillors, RPP-FM Board and Members, Rotary volunteers and support from local businesses and donations of money, labour and fittings. The project was managed by Captain Dick Cox from the Somerville-Tyabb Rotary Club along with Lindsay Edwards and was supported by the commercial builder Staff Building from Point Leo. The labour component involved volunteers which included several other Peninsula Rotary Clubs throughout the Mornington Peninsula Cluster, community and company donations of labour, goods and services.

The MPSC Councillors supported the renovation works with a Project & Fund Raising Committee being formed made up of the Chairman Cr Bill Goodrem and Deputy Chairman Cr Leigh Eustace along with several Directors of the MPSC and RPP-FM Board Member Maria McColl and Station Manager Brendon Telfer to oversee the works and finances. The Project & Fundraising Committee first met on 22 April 2010. Initial Project planning started with a bridging finance agreement agreed between the Committee and MPSC to fund project scoping, building plan development, site preparation and cleaning, and creation of a required materials list. Fundraising options were also developed.

As part of the project new state of the art radio studios, recording studio and communications room were developed along with supporting facilities for offices, meeting room, kitchen and toilet facilities. All radio transmission facilities were installed at the site along with upgraded transmission tower infrastructure at Arthurs Seat.

The opening of the new RPP-FM facility occurred on Saturday 24 September 2011 to great fanfare when the building was formerly opened to the community with tours of the facility and an official opening ceremony taking place in the abutting Peninsula Community Theatre.

RPP-FM after weeks of trials testing all equipment and transmission capabilities, RPP-FM formally started on-air transmissions from the new facility at Wilsons Road on 17 October 2011.

== Board ==
3RPP had until May 2010 had employed Maria McColl as Station Manager. After a long tenure of 22 years in the position 3RPP had advertised for a replacement. Following an extensive selection process, the station's committee appointed a new Station Manager, Mount Eliza based former ABC Radio producer Brendon Telfer.

Local newspaper Mornington Peninsula Mail described Brendon Telfer's appointment thus:

"He has an impressive management, production and on-air background with ABC's Radio Australia, which includes commentary work for major international events. He is a long-term resident of the peninsula with a great empathy for local issues and the role of 3RPP in the community"

The Committee of Management (The Board) of 3RPP consists of five people, these are:

- Graeme Kniese (President)
- Ellice Viggers (Secretary)
- John Fraser (Treasurer)
- Bob Phillips (Programming)
