= WGZO-LP =

- Bloomfield, Connecticut; United States
- Frequency: 98.7 MHz
- Branding: Heartbeat 98.7

Programming
- Format: Urban gospel

Ownership
- Owner: Connecticut Valley Hispanic Outreach

Technical information
- Licensing authority: FCC
- Facility ID: 192238
- Class: LP1
- ERP: 100 watts
- HAAT: 26 metres (85 ft)
- Transmitter coordinates: 41°50′38.1″N 72°39′50.3″W

Links
- Public license information: LMS
- Webcast: Listen live
- Website: www.heartbeat987.com

WGZO-LP (98.7 FM, "Heartbeat 98.7") is a radio station licensed to serve the community of Bloomfield, Connecticut. The station is owned by Connecticut Valley Hispanic Outreach and airs an urban gospel format.

The station was assigned the WGZO-LP call letters by the Federal Communications Commission on October 31, 2014.
