= Rate pressure product =

Cardiology concept

Pressure rate product (also known as Cardiovascular Product or Double Product), within medical cardiology, specifically for cardiovascular physiology and exercise physiology is used to determine the myocardial workload.

== Description ==
The calculation formula is: Rate Pressure Product (RPP) = Heart Rate (HR) * Systolic Blood Pressure (SBP)

The units for the Heart Rate are beats per minute and for the Blood Pressure mmHg.

Rate pressure product is a measure of the stress put on the cardiac muscle based on the number of times it needs to beat per minute (HR) and the arterial blood pressure that it is pumping against (SBP). It will be a direct indication of the energy demand of the heart and thus a good measure of the energy consumption of the heart.

The rate pressure product allows you to calculate the internal workload or hemodynamic response.

Hemodynamic Response	RPP
High	more than 30000
High Intermediate	25000 - 29999
Intermediate	20000 - 24999
Low Intermediate	15000 - 19999
Low	10000 - 14999
