= Mass media in Portland, Maine =

The following is a list of media located in, or serving Portland, Maine.

== Newspapers ==
- The Forecaster
- The Phoenix
- Portland Press Herald
  - Maine Sunday Telegram (Sunday edition of the Portland Press Herald)

== Magazines ==
- Mainer formerly known as The Bollard (2005-2019)
- Down East
- Dispatch
- Maine
- Portland Monthly

== Radio ==
=== FM ===
Callsign	Frequency
WYAR	88.3
WMSJ	89.3
WMEA (FM)	90.1
WMPG	90.9
WBQF	91.7
WYFP	91.9
WPKC-FM	92.1
WOXO-FM	92.7
WMGX	93.1
WCYY	94.3
WHOM	94.9
WPPI	95.5
WPEI	95.9
WJJB-FM	96.3
W245AA	96.9
WJBQ	97.9
WCLZ	98.9
WTHT	99.3
WTHT	99.9
WIGY-FM	100.7
WYNZ	100.9
WPOR	101.9
WBLM	102.9
WOKQ	103.7
WHTP-FM	104.7
WBCI	105.9
WHXR	106.3
WXTP	106.7
WFNK	107.5
WJZP-LP	107.9

=== AM ===
Callsign	Frequency
WGAN	560 AM
WJTO	730
WEZR	780
WLVP	870
WCME	900
WZAN	970 AM
WLOB	1310 AM
WVAE	1400
WRED (AM)	1440
WPNO	1450
WBAE (AM)	1490 AM
