= J. J. Jeffrey =

American radio executive and DJ (1940–2024)

J.J. Jeffrey
- Born: Joseph Noyes Jeffrey Jr. May 29, 1940; Portland, Maine, U.S.
- Died: October 10, 2024 (aged 84)
- Occupations: Disc jockey; radio executive
- Years active: 1960–2024
- Employers: WRKO; WFIL; WLS; WBLM; Fuller-Jeffrey Broadcasting; WOKQ; WLOB; WJJB; WPEI
- Known for: Co-owning Atlantic Coast Radio

Joseph Noyes "J. J." Jeffrey Jr. (May 29, 1940 – October 10, 2024) was an American radio executive and disc jockey (DJ) who specialized in rock-and-roll stations during the 1960s and 1970s.

== Life and career ==
Jeffrey's broadcasting career began in the late 1950s Maine with the help of such broadcasters as Frank Fixaris. Jeffrey moved to Boston in March 1967 as the afternoon-drive personality for WRKO, which — as NOW Radio and, later, The Big 68 — dominated New England's teen market in the late 1960s.

Jeffrey hosted WRKO's weekly "Now 30" (later called "Big 30") countdowns on Thursdays and was famous for his high-energy style and catch-phrases such as, "This is J.J. Jeffrey, whippin' my great, Greek-god-like body into a frenzy for ya." He left Boston on October 31, 1969, and became the afternoon drive DJ for Top 40 station WFIL in Philadelphia. In June 1971, he moved to late nights at WLS in Chicago, and then to mid-days.

In 1975, Jeffrey and his business partner, Bob Fuller, also a former Maine disc jockey, purchased their first radio station, WBLM, an FM album rock outlet based in Lewiston, Maine. They purchased other stations, including northern New England's highly popular country music FM station, WOKQ. In 1999, Fuller-Jeffrey Broadcasting was sold to Citadel Broadcasting for $63 million.

After the sale of Fuller-Jeffrey Broadcasting, Jeffrey and Fuller formed Atlantic Coast Radio, which owns and operates three radio stations in the Portland market:

- WLOB 1310 AM News/Talk
- WJJB 96.3 FM, 1440 (WRED) AM Sports station known as The Big Jab carrying Boston Red Sox baseball, Boston Celtics basketball and Portland Pirates ice hockey.
- WPEI 95.9 FM WPPI 95.5 FM, WEEI Multicast

Jeffrey died of cancer on October 10, 2024, at the age of 84.

== Sources ==
- https://web.archive.org/web/20070328214945/http://www.maine.rr.com/03/wlob/default.asp
