= Atlantic Coast Radio =

Atlantic Coast Radio, LLC is a radio company formed by longtime broadcaster J. J. Jeffrey and his partner Bob Fuller. It was incorporated in 1982 and has a staff of approximately twenty. Its studios are located at 779 Warren Ave. in Portland, Maine. Jeffrey and Fuller had also been partners in Fuller-Jeffrey Broadcasting. Fuller-Jeffrey's portfolio included WBLM and WOKQ. The company was sold to Citadel Broadcasting for $63 million in 1999. Jeffrey died in October 2024.

== 2008 changes ==
In August 2008 the company announced some big changes with its stations that would take place in late August 2008 and September 1. The changes were that Rhythmic Top 40 WRED 95.9, Red Hot 95.9, would be eliminated, turning into a WEEI multicast station under the calls WPEI. The Big Jab's FM simulcast on 95.5 FM would turn into a WEEI multicast station as well, under the call letters of WGEI. WLOB newsradio's FM simulcast on 96.3 FM would turn into the new FM simulcast of The Big Jab, and WLOB would go strictly AM on 1310 AM. So that WLOB didn't have to be heard in AM sound only, WLOB starting streaming online in September 2008, as Atlantic Coast Radio's first station to stream online. The Big Jab now brands itself under its FM simulcast as "96.3 The Big Jab". The Big Jab started streaming online in the spring of 2009.

In April 2009 WGEI 95.5 FM, flipped from a WEEI multicast station to a simulcast of AM sister station WLOB. The station has since changed call letters to WPPI. WLOB is no longer AM only, which it was from September 2008 to March 2009.

== Current stations ==
- WLOB 1310 AM and WPPI 95.5 FM News/Talk
- WJJB 96.3 FM, WRED (AM) 1440 AM, translator W223BH 92.5 FM, Sports.
- WPEI 95.9 FM, WEEI-FM multicast station.

== Former stations (as Fuller-Jeffrey Broadcasting) ==
- Seacoast market: WOKQ 97.5, WPKQ 103.7, WXBB 105.3, WXBP 102.1.
- Portland market: WCYI 93.9, WCYY 94.3, WHOM 94.9, WJBQ 97.9, WCLZ 98.9, WBLM 102.9.
