= WRED =

WRED may refer to:

- Weighted random early detection, a queue management algorithm used in computer networking
- WHOT-FM, a radio station (101.1 FM) licensed to Youngstown, Ohio, United States, which used the call signs WRED-FM from November 1959 until 1972
- WRED (AM), a radio station (1440 AM) licensed to Westbrook, Maine, United States
- WPEI, a radio station (95.9 FM) licensed to Saco, Maine, United States, which used the call signs WRED from July 1995 to September 2008 and WRED-FM during September 2008
