= WCYI =

WCYI may refer to:

- WCYI-LP, a low-power radio station (104.1 FM) licensed to serve Bloomington, Indiana, United States
- WARX, a radio station (93.9 FM) licensed to serve Lewiston, Maine, United States, which held the call sign WCYI from 1994 to 2008
