= Portland Sea Dogs Radio Network =

The U.S. Cellular Portland Sea Dogs Radio Network is a 4-station (2 A.M., 2 F.M.) radio network in the U.S. New England states of Maine and New England. The flagship is 95.5/95.9 WPEI/WPPI. The play-by-play announcer is Emma Tiedemann. The radio network broadcasts all 140 Portland Sea Dogs baseball games.

== Network stations ==
=== Flagship stations (2 stations) ===
- 95.5 WPPI: Topsham, Maine
- 95.9 WPEI: Saco, Maine

=== Affiliate stations (2 stations) ===
==== Maine (2 stations) ====
- 780 WEZR: Rumford
- 1450 WPNO: South Paris

== Former network stations (9 stations) ==
=== Former flagships (1 station) ===
- 1490 WBAE: Portland, Maine

=== Former affiliates (8 stations) ===
- 1160 WSKW: Skowhegan, Maine (2008)
- 1240 WEZR: Lewiston
- 1220 WPHX: Sanford, Maine (2005)
- 1380 WMYF: Portsmouth, New Hampshire (2012)
- 92.7 WOXO-FM: Norway, Maine (2005, 2012)
- 93.7 WRMO: Millbridge, Maine (2009–2010)
- 100.7 WTBM: Mexico, Maine (2005)
- 106.5 WMEX: Rochester, New Hampshire (2005)
