= WPKQ =

Simulcast of WCYY, Biddeford–Portland, Maine
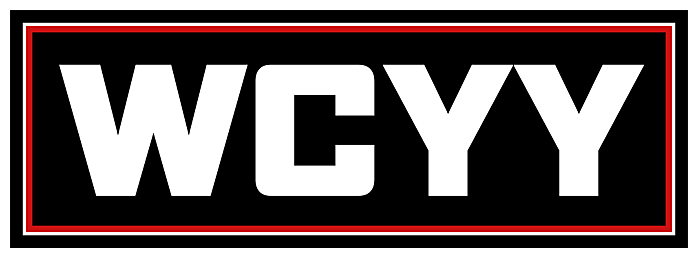
- North Conway, New Hampshire; United States
- Broadcast area: Northern New England
- Frequency: 103.7 MHz
- Branding: WCYY

Programming
- Format: Alternative rock
- Affiliations: New England Patriots Radio Network

Ownership
- Owner: Townsquare Media; (Townsquare License, LLC)
- Sister stations: WBLM; WCYY; WHOM; WJBQ; WOKQ; WSHK/WSAK

History
- First air date: March 1952 (as WMOU-FM)
- Former call signs: WMOU-FM (1952–1957); WKCQ (1957–1959); WMOU-FM (1959–1972); WXLQ-FM (1972–1979); WMOU (1983–1990); WZPK (1990–1996)
- Call sign meaning: "Peak" (former branding); also remnant of former simulcast of WOKQ

Technical information
- Licensing authority: FCC
- Facility ID: 48401
- Class: C
- ERP: 22,500 watts
- HAAT: 1,159 meters (3,802 ft)
- Transmitter coordinates: 44°16′13.2″N 71°18′15.2″W

Links
- Public license information: Public file; LMS
- Webcast: Listen live
- Website: wcyy.com

WPKQ (103.7 FM) is a commercial radio station licensed to North Conway, New Hampshire. It is owned by Townsquare Media and simulcasts the alternative rock format of 94.3 WCYY from the Portland, Maine, area. It is an affiliate of the New England Patriots Radio Network. WPKQ shares its main studio with WCYY at One City Center in Portland, Maine, with its sales office and auxiliary studio located in North Conway.

WPKQ has an effective radiated power (ERP) of 22,500 watts. Its transmitter is atop Mount Washington, the tallest peak in the Northeast, alongside sister station WHOM (94.9 FM). The station’s signal covers large portions of New Hampshire, western and southern Maine, central and northern Vermont and southeastern Quebec.

== History ==
The 103.7 frequency now occupied by WPKQ began in March 1952 as WMOU-FM, the FM sister station to WMOU (1230 AM) in Berlin. The stations became WKCB and WKCQ in 1957, but returned to their original callsigns two years later. WMOU-FM separated from the simulcast of WMOU in 1972 and became WXLQ-FM, airing a rock and oldies format. This evolved to a mix of top 40 and oldies in 1975. The station reverted to the WMOU simulcast in 1977 (but retained the WXLQ call letters). A construction permit for a new 103.7, using WXLQ's former transmitter, was granted on August 8, 1983, to New England Broadcasting, Inc. (formed by Steve Powell, the son of previous WMOU owner Bob Powell) and revived the WMOU call letters (without the "-FM" suffix), with a license to cover issued on March 15, 1984.

The station moved its transmitter to Mount Washington in 1990, and changed its format to hot adult contemporary as WZPK, "103.7 Peak-FM". Branding themselves as "The Peak of New England" with a Class C flamethrower signal that reached from Boston to Montreal, the station debuted by asking on-air to its audience what they wanted on air by airing the message "We are building YOUR Superstation. Please tell us what you would like to hear", and supplied a 1-800 number for listeners to contact the station.

In 1996, 103.7 adopted its present callsign and a country music format, simulcast from WOKQ in Dover, upon its sale to Fuller-Jeffrey Broadcasting. The city of license was changed to North Conway in 1999.

On July 6, 2015, WPKQ split from its simulcast with WOKQ and rebranded as "103.7 The Peak". In doing so, it moved its studios from WOKQ's facility in Dover to Townsquare's studios in North Conway and Portland, Maine, alongside fellow Mount Washington broadcaster WHOM. By 2021, the station's programming was again largely originated from WOKQ, though it retained localized commercial breaks and the "Peak" branding.

On October 22, 2021, at noon, WPKQ dropped its country format and began stunting towards a new format to launch on Monday, October 25. That day, the station began simulcasting a relaunched version of the alternative rock format from Portland, Maine-market sister station WCYY; owing to WPKQ's Mount Washington's transmitter, the change resulted in WCYY's programming becoming available in much of northern New England. WCYY's expansion, which also included WJZN in Augusta, Maine, coincided with the syndication launch of Toucher and Rich from WBZ-FM in Boston, with the WCYY stations, along with Bangor sister station WEZQ, serving as the program's first affiliates. The WCYY stations dropped Toucher and Rich in October 2023.
