= Carter Broadcasting =

American broadcasting group

Carter Broadcasting is a New England based broadcasting group owned by Ken Carberry. Its headquarters are in Braintree, Massachusetts.

== Currently-owned stations ==
=== Massachusetts (1 station) ===
- WACE/730: Chicopee (sale to Holy Family Communications pending).

== Former stations ==
=== Maine ===
- WLOB/1310: Portland (1980-2000)
- WWMR/96.3: Rumford (1987-2000)

=== Massachusetts ===
- WROL/950: Boston
- WCRN/830: Worcester

=== Rhode Island ===
- WRIB/1220: Providence (1978-2006)
