= Portland Sea Dogs =

Minor League Baseball team in Maine

- Founded in 1994; Portland, Maine

Team logo	Cap insignia

Minor league affiliations
- Class: Double-A (1994–present)
- League: Eastern League (1994–present)
- Division: Northeast Division

Major league affiliations
- Team: Boston Red Sox (2003–present)
- Previous teams: Florida Marlins (1994–2002)

Minor league titles
- League titles (1): 2006
- Division titles (6): 1995; 1996; 1997; 2005; 2014; 2024
- Second-half titles (1): 2022

Team data
- Name: Portland Sea Dogs (1994–present)
- Colors: Navy, red, gray, white, gold, black
- Mascot: Slugger
- Ballpark: Delta Dental Park at Hadlock Field (1994–present)
- Owner/ Operator: Diamond Baseball Holdings
- President: Geoff Iacuessa
- General manager: Jesse Scaglion
- Manager: Kyle Sasala (acting)
- Website: milb.com/portland

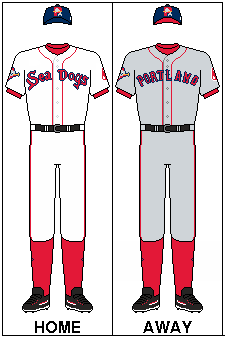
Portland Sea Dogs Uniform

The Portland Sea Dogs are a Minor League Baseball team based in Portland, Maine, playing in the Eastern League. (Note: Portland is 107 miles (172 km) from Fenway Park in Boston.) Established in 1994, the Sea Dogs are the Double-A affiliate of the Boston Red Sox.

Originally affiliated with the Florida Marlins, the Sea Dogs became part of the Red Sox system for the 2003 season. The team went to the Eastern League championship series in 2005, losing to the Akron Aeros; and again in 2006, when they defeated the Aeros to win the first Double-A championship for a Red Sox farm team since the New Britain Red Sox in 1983.

All games are carried on a network of radio stations with Emma Tiedemann providing the play-by-play, with the flagship WPEI doing both home and away games.

== History ==
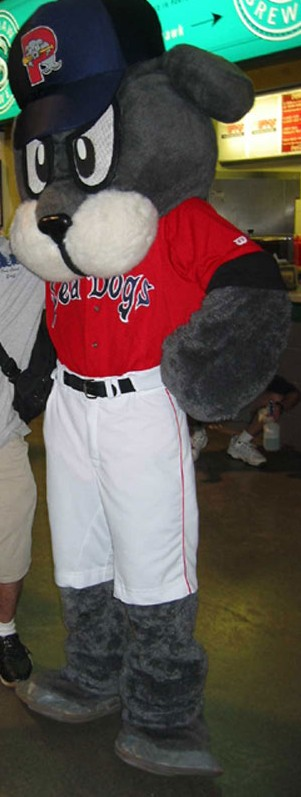
Slugger the Sea Dog, the team mascot

Minor league baseball returned to Maine on October 4, 1992, when Portland was awarded one of two Eastern League expansion franchises (the other being the New Haven Ravens) to begin play in April 1994. The Sea Dogs signed an affiliation agreement with the Florida Marlins on May 3, 1993, beginning a nine-season relationship. The city renovated Hadlock Field, transforming a high-school stadium into a professional ballpark. City manager Robert Ganley led efforts to renovate Hadlock Field and return professional baseball to Portland.

The team won its first game, defeating the Reading Phillies on the road 2–1, with the help of a 14th-inning home run by future major league catcher Charles Johnson. The team opened Hadlock Field on April 18, 1994, losing 7–6 to the Albany-Colonie Yankees.

Cartoonist Guy Gilchrist designed the team's logo. His comic strip Mudpie had a series of strips in which the young cat's family visit the Portland area and attend a Sea Dogs game.

The team won its sole league title on September 17, 2006, defeating the Akron Aeros 8–5, in a rematch of the series from the previous year.

When Major League Baseball restructured Minor League Baseball in 2021, the Sea Dogs were organized into the Double-A Northeast. In 2022, the division was renamed the Eastern League, the name used by the regional circuit before the 2021 reorganization.

Ahead of the 2023 season, the Sea Dogs' longtime owners, the Burke family, sold the team to Diamond Baseball Holdings.

In August 2024, Portland cartoonist Lincoln Peirce featured the team in his comic strip Big Nate.

== Stadium ==
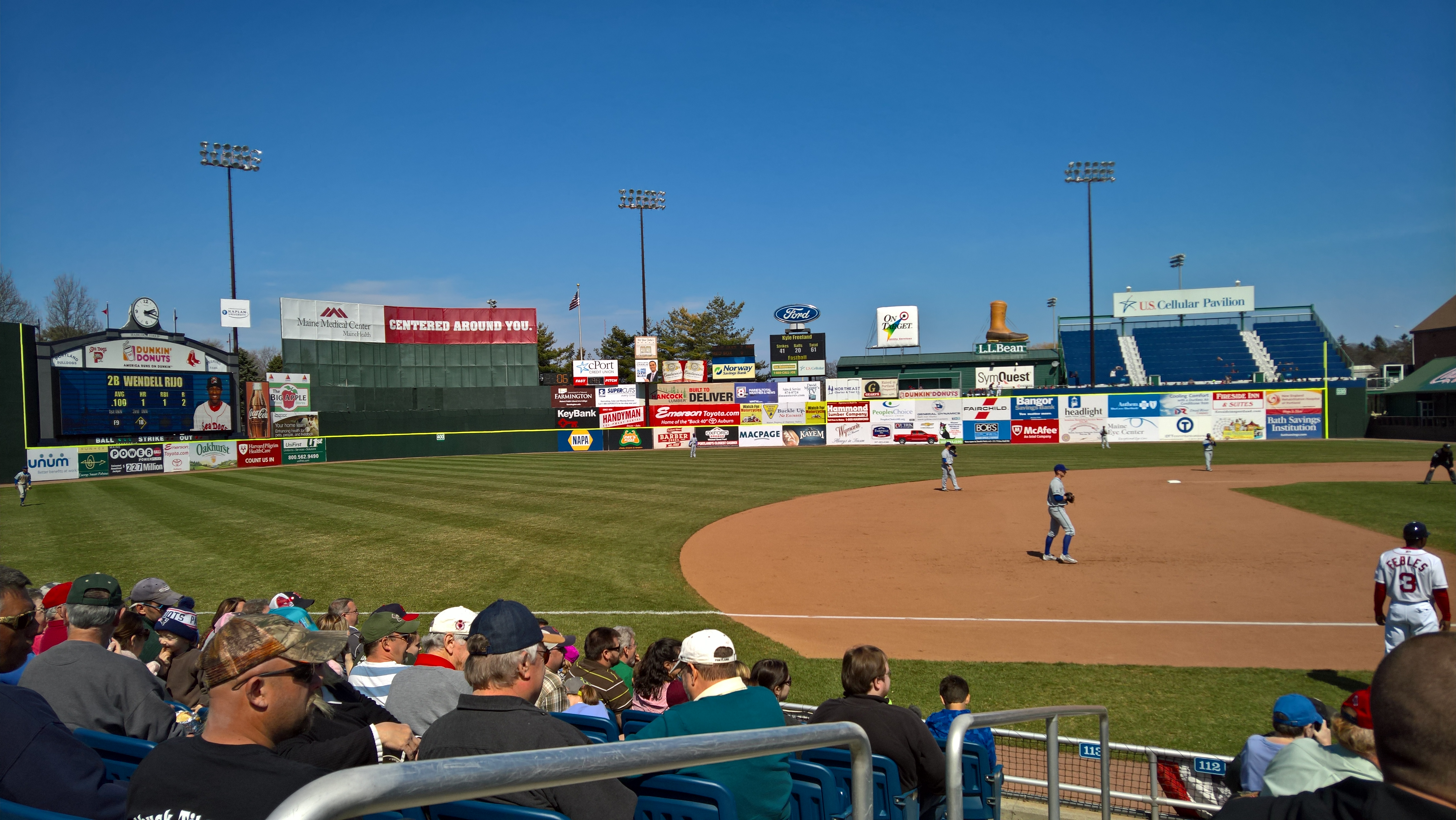
The Sea Dogs hosting the Hartford Yard Goats during the 2016 season

The Sea Dogs' home stadium is Delta Dental Park at Hadlock Field, named after longtime Portland High School baseball coach Edson Hadlock. It has a seating capacity of 7,368. Hadlock Field is often visited by vacationing celebrities, such as former NFL coach Bill Parcells, former U.S. President George H. W. Bush, and his wife Barbara. In left field stands the Maine Monster, a 37-foot (11 m) replica of Fenway Park's Green Monster, complete with Coke bottle and Citgo sign. Along the right-field foul line just beyond first base, a picnic pavilion is available for group outings from 20 up to 300 people. In 2006, a new pavilion opened above the right-field wall over the Sea Dogs bullpen. Modeled after the Green Monster seats at Fenway Park in Boston, it seats up to 393 people and gives fans an opportunity to catch a home run ball. After the 2024 season, construction began on a new locker room facility behind the left field grandstand.

== Logo ==
The logo was designed by Guy Gilchrist and has remained the same throughout the franchise's existence with the exception of a color scheme change to reflect the team's affiliate transition from Marlins to Red Sox. It features an animated harbor seal whose head and flippers appear through the gap in the letter P. Explaining the inspirations for the logo, Gilchrist stated, "At the time that I did the Sea Dogs, the biggest-selling logos were the San Jose Sharks and the (Chicago) Bulls. And so, I mean, duh. I took Slugger and instead of him having a hockey stick in his mouth, I put a bat in his mouth. And I had him looking straight at us, just like a bull."

Slugger the Sea Dog has been the Sea Dogs' mascot since May 6, 1994. The name originated from a cracked Carl Yastrzemski bat which Gilchrist received from Roger LaFrancois in the early 1980s.

== Season records ==
The team was a member of the Northeast division of the Eastern League from 1994 to 2020 and the Northeast division of Double-A Northeast in 2021. They have been members of the Eastern League's Northeast division since 2022.

In the below table, "Place" represents finish within the team's division for the overall regular reason. Note that in 2019 and since 2022, the Eastern League played a split-season schedule, with first half and second-half winners advancing to the postseason.

Legend
Place	Playoffs
Division champions	Won championship series
Made playoffs	Lost championship series

Results by season
Year	W–L	Pct.	Place	Manager	Playoffs
1994	60–81	.426	4th	Carlos Tosca	
1995	86–56	.606	1st	Carlos Tosca	Lost to New Haven, 3–2 in semifinals
1996	83–58	.589	1st	Carlos Tosca	Defeated Binghamton, 3–2 in semifinals Lost to Harrisburg, 3–2 in championship
1997	79–63	.556	1st	Fredi González	Defeated Norwich, 3–2 in semifinals Lost to Harrisburg, 3–1 in championship
1998	66–75	.468	3rd	Lynn Jones	
1999	65–77	.458	3rd	Frank Cacciatore	
2000	71–70	.504	4th	Rick Renteria	
2001	77–65	.542	3rd	Rick Renteria	
2002	63–77	.450	5th	Eric Fox	
2003	72–70	.507	3rd	Ron Johnson	
2004	69–73	.486	4th	Ron Johnson	
2005	76–66	.535	1st	Todd Claus	Defeated Trenton, 3–2 in semifinals Lost to Akron, 3–1 in championship
2006	72–67	.518	2nd	Todd Claus	Defeated Trenton, 3–1 in semifinals Defeated Akron, 3–2 in championship
2007	71–72	.497	2nd	Arnie Beyeler	Lost to Trenton, 3–1 in semifinals
2008	74–66	.529	2nd	Arnie Beyeler	Lost to Trenton, 3–0 in semifinals
2009	67–74	.475	4th	Arnie Beyeler	
2010	70–71	.496	3rd	Arnie Beyeler	
2011	59–83	.415	6th	Kevin Boles	
2012	68–73	.482	4th	Kevin Boles	
2013	68–73	.482	4th	Kevin Boles	
2014	88–54	.620	1st	Billy McMillon	Lost to Binghamton, 3–2 in semifinals
2015	53–89	.373	6th	Billy McMillon	
2016	55–84	.396	6th	Carlos Febles	
2017	65–74	.468	4th	Carlos Febles	
2018	63–76	.453	6th	Darren Fenster	
2019	62–77	.446	6th	Joe Oliver	
2020	—	—	—	Joe Oliver	Season cancelled due to COVID-19 pandemic
2021	67–47	.588	2nd	Corey Wimberly	
2022	75–63	.543	3rd	Chad Epperson	Lost to Somerset, 2–0 in semifinals
2023	73–63	.537	3rd	Chad Epperson	
2024	78–60	.565	1st	Chad Epperson	
2025	64–71	.474	4th	Chad Epperson	
2026	71–65	.522	2nd	Kyle Sasala	

== Roster ==
Portland Sea Dogs roster
Players	Coaches/Other
Pitchers: 35 Cooper Adams; 23 Caleb Bolden; 53 Alex Bouchard; 30 Steven Brooks; 32 Max Carlson; 39 Devin Futrell; 18 Tanner Houck * #; 17 Griffin Kilander; 22 Morgan McSweeney; 57 Yordanny Monegro; 47 Hayden Mullins ~; 29 Aaron Nixon; 20 Erik Rivera; 15 Dalton Rogers ~; 56 Reidis Sena; 36 Joe Vogatsky; 59 Jeremy Wu-Yelland; Catchers: 11 Brooks Brannon; 38 Johanfran Garcia; 25 Ronald Rosario; 28 Hudson White; Infielders: 17 Yoeilin Cespedes; 21 Henry Godbout; 51 Ahbram Liendo; 18 Mason White; 16 Jack Winnay; Outfielders: 2 Miguel Bleis; 49 Justin Gonzales; 24 Isaiah Jackson; 7 Caden Rose; 3 Nelly Taylor; 5 Will Turner	Manager: 54 Kyle Sasala; Coaches: 53 Elijah Boyer (assistant hitting); 88 Trevor Burmeister (hitting); 77 Isaiah Page (assistant pitching); 66 Juan Rivera (pitching); 60-day injured list: 52 Marvin Alcantara; 7-day injured list; * On Boston Red Sox 40-man roster; ~ Development list; # Rehab assignment; ∞ Reserve list; ‡ Restricted list; § Suspended list; † Temporarily inactive list; Roster updated September 11, 2026; Transactions; → More rosters: MiLB • Eastern League; → Boston Red Sox minor league players

== Broadcasts ==
Sea Dogs games can be heard on the following radio stations: 95.5 WPPI Topsham, Maine, 95.9 WPEI: Saco, Maine, 780 WEZR: Rumford, Maine, and 1450 WPNO: South Paris, Maine. Game audio is also streamed for free on MiLB.com

Games can be watched for free using the Bally Live app, or with a paid subscription to MiLB.TV, though Black Out Restrictions may apply.

== Notes ==
Preceded by Trenton Thunder	Boston Red Sox; Double-A affiliate 2003–present	Succeeded by current
