= The Big JAB =

Sports radio stations in Maine, United States

WRED and WJJB-FM

WRED: Westbrook, Maine; WJJB-FM: Gray, Maine; United States
- Broadcast area: Western Maine
- Frequencies: WRED: 1440 kHz; WJJB-FM: 96.3 MHz
- Branding: 96.3 The Big JAB

Programming
- Format: Sports
- Affiliations: Fox Sports Radio; Boston Celtics; Boston Red Sox; Maine Celtics

Ownership
- Owner: Atlantic Coast Radio
- Sister stations: WLOB; WPEI; WPPI

History
- First air date: WRED: November 8, 1959; WJJB-FM: November 15, 1975
- Former call signs: WRED: WJAB (1959–1974); WJBQ (1974–1981); WMER (1981–1986); WWGT (1986–1990); WLPZ (1990–1997); WJAE (1997–2008); WJJB (2008); WJJB-FM: WRUM-FM (1975–1981); WWMR (1981–1983); WWMR-FM (1983–1997); WLOB-FM (1997–2008)
- Call sign meaning: WRED: The color red, previously used on WPEI; WJJB-FM: similar to WJAB

Technical information
- Licensing authority: FCC
- Facility ID: WRED: 3140; WJJB-FM: 9180
- Class: WRED: B; WJJB-FM: C1
- Power: WRED: 5,000 watts
- ERP: WJJB-FM: 430 meters (1,410 ft)
- Transmitter coordinates: WRED: 43°40′50.29″N 70°22′45.18″W; WJJB-FM: 44°15′3.3″N 70°25′14.2″W
- Translator(s): WRED: 92.5 W223BH (Portland)

Links
- Public license information: WRED: Public file; LMS; WJJB-FM: Public file; LMS
- Webcast: Listen live
- Website: www.thebigjab.com

The Big JAB is the name of two sports radio stations in western and southern Maine, owned by Atlantic Coast Radio. It is heard on WRED (1440 AM, licensed to Westbrook) and WJJB-FM (96.3 FM, licensed to Gray). The stations air local sports talk hosts Monday through Friday. Fox Sports Radio provides programming nights and weekends. In July 2017 Atlantic Coast Radio purchased a 250-watt translator at 92.5 MHz from Augusta, Maine-based Light of Life Ministries to further augment its Portland-area FM signal.

Studios and offices are located on 779 Warren Avenue in Portland, Maine. The AM transmitter is off Juniper Lane in Westbrook. The FM transmitter is near King Hill Road in South Paris, Maine.

== History ==
=== 1440 history ===
The 1440 frequency first went on the air November 8, 1959, as WJAB. At first it was a daytime only station playing top 40 music, giving major competition to cross-town top 40 leader WLOB. WJAB quickly became the top rated top 40 station in Portland, a position it held until 1965, when a resurgent WLOB, after having obtained night power, retook the top spot. In 1974, WJAB launched an FM simulcast on 106.3 WJBQ-FM, to allow listeners with FM radios to hear the station around the clock. The WJBQ call sign was eventually added to the AM station as well. In 1980, WJBQ-FM relocated to 97.9 in a frequency swap with classical music station WDCS, a predecessor to WBACH.

In the intervening years, the AM station would attempt several formats, including all-news (as WMER), a simulcast of what had become WWGT-FM (as WWGT), and an affiliation with the hard rock/heavy metal Z Rock Network (as WLPZ). In the mid-1990s, the station settled on a sports radio format. Initially retaining the WLPZ call letters, it became WJAE in 1997 in an attempt to restore the WJAB identity to the station. (The station could not reclaim the original call sign because it was now being used by a station in Alabama.) Then-owners Bob Fuller and J. J. Jeffrey had previously worked at WJAB during the 1960s. Jeffrey retained WJAE by way of Atlantic Coast Radio upon the sale of Fuller-Jeffrey's FM stations to Citadel Broadcasting in 1999.

=== 96.3 history ===
The 96.3 frequency debuted in 1975 as WRUM-FM, call letters derived from its AM sister station, WRUM (790 AM), and in turn their city of license of Rumford. In 1981, the call letters were changed to WWMR, and by 1983 the format was a high-energy top 40/AOR hybrid with live DJs and the branding "96 WMR". Additionally, the station's power was boosted significantly, giving it wider coverage in Central Maine. In 1987, WWMR-FM was sold to Carter Broadcasting, and the station adopted a religious format. Carter eventually consolidated the operations of WWMR with that of Portland sister station WLOB, and in 1997 the call sign was changed to WLOB-FM. After WLOB and WLOB-FM were sold to Atlantic Coast Radio in 2000, the religious programming was discontinued in favor of a news-talk format. In 2006, WLOB-FM relocated its transmitter from western Maine to South Paris to provide a clearer signal to the Portland media market. Following the transmitter move, in 2008 WLOB-FM changed its city of license from Rumford to Gray. On August 25, 2008, WLOB-FM converted from the WLOB simulcast to an all-sports simulcast of The Big JAB.

From 1999 to 2008, the Big JAB's programming was also heard on WJJB (900 AM), licensed to Brunswick. In 2008, that frequency became WWBK and the WJJB call sign subsequently moved to 1440. WWBK was sold to Bob Bittner (owner of WJIB and WJTO) for $27,000.

Additionally, from 2000 to 2008, The Big JAB's FM frequency was on 95.5. Initially, the station continued to broadcast under its previous WCLZ call letters. On September 1, 2008, 95.5 began airing programming from Boston sports station WEEI in a simulcast with 95.9 WPEI; it eventually changed its call sign from WJJB-FM to WGEI, and is now WPPI.

== Stations ==
Broadcast translator for WRED
Call sign	Frequency	City of license	FID	ERP (W)	HAAT	Class	Transmitter coordinates	FCC info
W223BH	92.5 FM	Portland, Maine	145407	175	57 m (187 ft)	D	43°39′17.2″N 70°15′49.1″W	LMS

== Programming ==
- The Morning Jab
- Middays with Mannix and Mannix
- The PM JAB
- Boston Red Sox baseball, from the Red Sox Radio Network
- Fox Sports Radio (with SportsMap carried for sports updates during local programming)
- Maine Red Claws basketball
- selected Maine State Championship football games

== Former hosts/shows ==
- Frank Fixaris

== Co-owned stations ==
- WLOB 1310 AM, Licensed to Portland, Maine, currently a talk format.
- WPEI 95.9 FM, Licensed to Saco, Maine, part of the WEEI Radio Network
- WPPI 95.5 FM, Licensed to Topsham, Maine, part of the WEEI Radio Network
