= Frank Fixaris =

American sportscaster (1934–2006)

- Born: May 6, 1934; Torrington, Connecticut, U.S.
- Died: January 13, 2006 (aged 71); Falmouth, Maine, U.S.
- Resting place: Evergreen Cemetery, Portland, Maine, U.S.
- Education: Emerson College (B.S.)
- Occupation: Sportscaster
- Spouse: Barbara Ritchie
- Children: 1

Francis J. Fixaris (May 6, 1934 – January 13, 2006) was an American sportscaster, anchor, reporter, and disc jockey, spending the majority of his career at WGME-TV in Portland, Maine. He also, along with partner Dave "Shoe" Schumacher, co-hosted a morning radio show on WJAB after his television run. "Shoe" continued the show, known as "The Morning Jab", with Joe Palmieri.

== Background ==
Francis J. Fixaris was born in Torrington, Connecticut, on May 6, 1934. He graduated from Emerson College with a bachelor of science degree in 1956.

== Career ==
Fixaris then worked at several radio stations early in his career before taking the job as a sports anchor at WGME in 1965 (then WGAN) and continued there until 1995. He served as sports director there from 1967 until 1992. Coincidentally Fixaris' cousin, former Major League Baseball player Jimmy Piersall, also worked as a sportscaster.

He was the color commentator of the Maine Mariners, and later the Portland Pirates of the American Hockey League. Although offered several network positions (particularly with CBS, as well as the New York Islanders), he chose to remain in Maine. He was co-awarded one of the James H. Ellery Memorial Awards by the AHL for his outstanding work in 1978.

He was known as having an encyclopedic knowledge of all things sports, especially at the local level. Popular broadcasters Mike Emrick, Dale Arnold, Tom Caron, Scott Wykoff and J.J. Jeffrey considered him as being instrumental in their development.

== Personal life, death, and legacy ==
Fixaris and his wife, Barbara (née Ritchie) Fixaris, were married for 37 years, and had a son.

In the early hours of January 13, 2006, Fixaris died in a fire at his home in Falmouth, Maine. A longtime smoker, it is believed the fire started when he fell asleep while smoking. He had previously survived a fire in 1960, in which he had sustained burns to his hand. He was survived by his wife and son, and is buried at Evergreen Cemetery in Portland, Maine.

In honor of his many years of work with the Mariners/Pirates, the press box at the Cumberland County Civic Center bears his name as a memorial tribute. A 2006 inductee into the Maine Association of Broadcaster's hall of fame, Fixaris is also remembered annually with an award in his name issued by the Portland Fire Department, as well as two scholarships for students studying communication science at Saint Joseph's College of Maine.

The Fix Cup, a former annual high school hockey tournament in Portland (modeled after the Beanpot tournament), was named after Fixaris.
