= WJBQ =

- Portland, Maine; United States
- Broadcast area: Southern and Western Maine
- Frequency: 97.9 MHz
- Branding: Q97 dot 9

Programming
- Format: Top 40 (CHR)
- Affiliations: Compass Media Networks

Ownership
- Owner: Townsquare Media; (Townsquare License, LLC)
- Sister stations: WBLM; WCYY; WHOM; WPKQ

History
- First air date: June 1960 (as WLOB-FM)
- Former call signs: WLOB-FM (1960–1971); WDCS (1971–1980); WJBQ-FM (1980–1986); WWGT (6/1986–8/1986); WWGT-FM (1986–1991); WCSO (1991–1997)

Technical information
- Licensing authority: FCC
- Facility ID: 3134
- Class: B
- ERP: 16,000 watts
- HAAT: 271 meters (889 ft)
- Transmitter coordinates: 43.852°N 70.327°W

Links
- Public license information: Public file; LMS
- Webcast: Listen live
- Website: wjbq.com

WJBQ (97.9 FM; Q97 dot 9) is a commercial radio station in Portland, Maine. It is owned by Townsquare Media and it airs a top 40 (CHR) format. The studios and offices are at One City Center in Downtown Portland.

WJBQ has an effective radiated power (ERP) of 16,000 watts as a Class B station. Its transmitter is on Eagles Nest Road in Gray, Maine, near the Maine Turnpike. The signal can be heard throughout Southwestern Maine, into portions of adjacent New Hampshire, and occasionally in the Canadian province of Nova Scotia.

== History ==
=== WLOB-FM and WDCS history ===
In June 1960, the station signed on as WLOB-FM, simulcast with co-owned WLOB (1310 AM). Over time, WLOB-AM-FM became Portland's highest-rated Top 40 radio stations, although in those days, few people had FM radios and most were listening to WLOB AM. WLOB-AM-FM were sold to Portland Broadcasting Corporation on March 3, 1965. The AM and FM simulcast ended on March 1, 1971, when the two stations were acquired by separate companies.

WLOB (AM) went to Aurovideo Incorporated while still maintaining a Top 40 format. Meanwhile, WLOB-FM went to Dirigo Communications Incorporation, changing its call sign to WDCS-FM and switching to a classical music format. The commercial classical station on 97.9 FM lasted nine years.

=== WJBQ ===
WJBQ-FM debuted on July 15, 1974, as a 3,000-watt Top 40 station. It broadcast on 106.3 FM licensed to Scarborough, Maine, just outside Portland. It was simulcast with WJBQ (1440 AM) in nearby Westbrook, Maine. The main competition for WJBQ-AM-FM was WLOB, which was one of the highest rated contemporary hits stations in the country. In its first Arbitron ratings, WJBQ-AM-FM edged WLOB by about three points. As the audience shifted to FM from AM, it meant a gradual decline for WLOB.

WLOB continued as an AM Top 40 station for a while longer, probably because it had the backing of legendary consultant Paul Drew protege Ron Foster and others. Meanwhile, WJBQ was staffed by Wally Brine doing mornings (later at WROR-FM in Boston), Joe McMillan in middays (who went on to WHDH in Boston and KABL in San Francisco), and Jeff Ryder in the afternoon slot (also the station's program director, who went on to WBBF in Rochester, New York, and WOKY in Milwaukee). By 1977, WLOB had changed formats to an older-targeted adult contemporary format.

In September 1980, WJBQ's owner John Bride swapped frequencies and formats with Portland classical music station WDCS on 97.9 FM. This would make WJBQ a full-power 50,000-watt facility, with the lower-rated classical programming moving to the 3,000-watt signal at 106.3. The move proved to be profitable for WJBQ. High-profile names like Andy Carey, Brian Phoenix, and Harry Nelson took turns as the station's program directors, and brought it continued high ratings.

In August 1986, Bride sold WJBQ in order to launch independent UHF TV station WPXT. The new owner was former WJTO and WIGY owner Turner Porter, who launched an ambitious full-service adult contemporary format featuring Joe McMillan in morning drive and NBC Talknet at night. It took new call letters, WWGT, or "The Great 98". Jack O'Brien was imported from sister station WERZ in Exeter, New Hampshire, as program director. This "AM on FM" approach did not garner the success that was hoped for, and the station changed format again on November 2, 1987.

The full-service AC format was replaced with CHR as "G-98" with Jon Holiday as the programming consultant. Under Holiday's guidance, the station competed against CHR rivals WTHT and WIGY, achieved ratings success, and remained its CHR format as G-98 until September 1991. Beginning that year, the station changed on-air slogans several times (as Ocean, Coast, etc.) It remained an adult contemporary station with the WCSO call sign for several years. It returned to its Top 40 roots for a third time and original WJBQ call letters in November 1996, under the ownership of Fuller-Jeffrey Radio. Fuller-Jeffrey later sold the station to Citadel Broadcasting. Citadel merged with Cumulus Media on September 16, 2011.

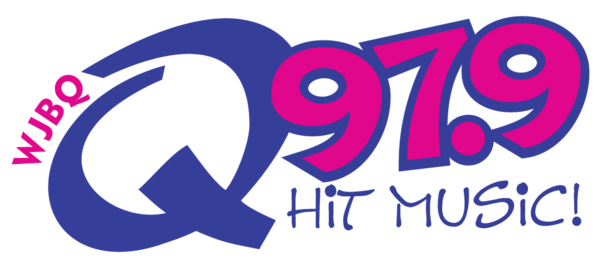
Previous logo

On August 30, 2013, a deal was announced in which Townsquare Media would acquire 53 Cumulus stations, including WJBQ, for $238 million. The deal was part of Cumulus' acquisition of Dial Global; Townsquare and Dial Global were both controlled by Oaktree Capital Management. The sale to Townsquare was completed on November 14, 2013.
