= WSAK =

Classic hits radio station in Hampton, New Hampshire

WSAK and WSHK

WSAK: Hampton, New Hampshire; WSHK: Kittery, Maine; United States
- Broadcast area: WSAK: southern Seacoast Region (New Hampshire); Merrimack Valley; North Shore (Massachusetts); WSHK: Seacoast Region (New Hampshire); York County, Maine
- Frequencies: WSAK: 102.1 MHz; WSHK: 105.3 MHz
- Branding: 102.1 & 105.3 - The Shark

Programming
- Format: Classic hits
- Affiliations: Compass Media Networks; New England Patriots Radio Network

Ownership
- Owner: Townsquare Media; (Townsquare License, LLC)
- Sister stations: WOKQ; WPKQ; WHOM

History
- First air date: WSAK: August 1992 (as WZEA); WSHK: November 1992 (as WXBB)
- Former call signs: WSAK: WZEA (1991–1995); WSTG (1995–1997); WXBP (1997–2000); WSHK: WKCD (1989–1992); WHIM-FM (1992); WXBB (1992–2000)
- Call sign meaning: "Shark"

Technical information
- Licensing authority: FCC
- Facility ID: WSAK: 12155; WSHK: 4380
- Class: WSAK: A; WSHK: A
- ERP: WSAK: 3,000 watts; WSHK: 2,200 watts
- HAAT: WSAK: 100 meters (330 ft); WSHK: 113 meters (371 ft)
- Transmitter coordinates: WSAK: 42.898°N 70.883°W; WSHK: 43°10′28.3″N 70°46′48.1″W

Links
- Public license information: WSAK: Public file; LMS; WSHK: Public file; LMS
- Webcast: Listen live
- Website: shark1053.com

WSAK (102.1 FM) and WSHK (105.3 FM) are a pair of American radio stations broadcasting a classic hits music format to the Seacoast Region of New Hampshire, York County, Maine, and northeast Massachusetts. WSAK is licensed to serve Hampton, New Hampshire, and WSHK is licensed to serve Kittery, Maine; their broadcast studios are located in Dover. WSHK’s transmitter is located in South Eliot, Maine, while WSAK’s transmitter is in Seabrook, New Hampshire, adjacent to the Massachusetts border. A few specialty programs are carried: The House of Blues Radio Hour with Dan "Elwood Blues" Aykroyd, and "The Reporter's File", a public affairs program, both on Sundays. The Shark was previously the only New Hampshire stations to carry the syndicated Bob & Tom Show morning show. It no longer carries that program, instead using its own local DJs on The Shark Morning Show.

WSAK and WSHK are owned by Townsquare Media. They formerly broadcast as "Arrow", on the same frequencies and with a similar format, but using call letters WXBB and WXBP. The change to the new name and call was made in March 2000. Citadel Broadcasting acquired the station in August 1999 when it purchased Fuller-Jeffrey Broadcasting Companies. Citadel merged with Cumulus Media on September 16, 2011.

On August 30, 2013, a deal was announced in which Townsquare Media would acquire 53 Cumulus stations, including WSAK/WSHK, for $238 million. The deal was part of Cumulus' acquisition of Dial Global; Townsquare and Dial Global are both controlled by Oaktree Capital Management. The sale to Townsquare was completed on November 14, 2013.
