= WEEI-FM =

Sports radio station in Lawrence, Massachusetts, serving Boston

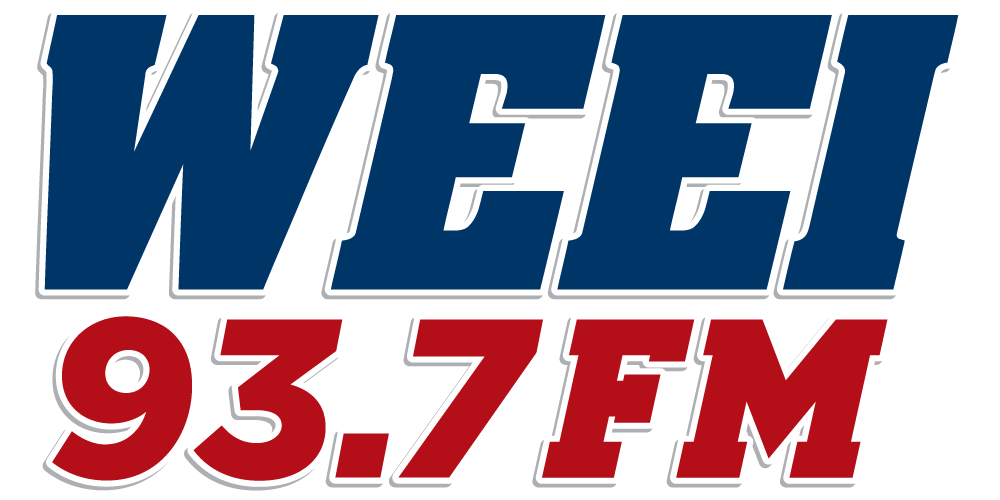
- Lawrence, Massachusetts; United States
- Broadcast area: Greater Boston
- Frequency: 93.7 MHz (HD Radio)
- Branding: 93-7 WEEI

Programming
- Language: English
- Format: Sports radio
- Subchannels: HD2: "WAAF" (active rock)
- Network: Westwood One Sports
- Affiliations: Boston Red Sox; Westwood One Sports

Ownership
- Owner: Audacy, Inc.; (Audacy License, LLC)
- Sister stations: WBGB; WEEI; WMJX; WVEI; WBMX

History
- First air date: April 1960
- Former call signs: WGHJ (1960–1963); WCCM-FM (1963–1974); WCGY (1974–1994); WEGQ (1994–1999); WQSX (1999–2005); WMKK (2005–2011)
- Call sign meaning: Derived from its AM sister station, for Edison Electric Illuminating

Technical information
- Licensing authority: FCC
- Facility ID: 1919
- Class: B
- ERP: 34,000 watts
- HAAT: 178 meters (584 ft)
- Transmitter coordinates: 42°31′53.3″N 70°59′10.2″W

Links
- Public license information: Public file; LMS
- Webcast: Listen live (via Audacy)
- Website: www.audacy.com/weei

WEEI-FM (93.7 MHz) – branded SportsRadio 93.7 WEEI-FM – is a commercial sports radio station licensed to Lawrence, Massachusetts, serving Greater Boston and much of surrounding New England. Owned by Audacy, Inc., WEEI-FM is the Boston affiliate for Westwood One Sports, the NFL on Westwood One Sports, the flagship station for the Boston Red Sox Radio Network; and the radio home of Greg Hill, Lou Merloni, Christian Fauria and Jermaine Wiggins.

The WEEI-FM studios are located in Boston's Brighton neighborhood, while the station transmitter resides in the nearby suburb of Peabody. In addition to a standard analog transmission, WEEI-FM broadcasts over two HD Radio channels, and is available online via Audacy. WEEI-FM's weekday programming lineup is also regionally syndicated to a network of stations throughout New England, most of which use the "SportsRadio WEEI" franchised brand.

The sports format currently heard on WEEI-FM launched on September 3, 1991, on the former WEEI (590 AM). The call letters WEEI-FM, formerly on a station in Westerly, Rhode Island, were granted on September 21, 2011, as part of a call letter shuffle. The 93.7 frequency, established in 1960, has carried WEEI programming since September 12, 2011, and has been the primary station for local WEEI programming since October 4, 2012.

== History ==
=== Early years ===
In the station's early days as WGHJ and WCCM-FM, 93.7 aired locally based programming that targeted Lawrence and other towns in the Merrimack Valley as the FM sister station of WCCM (800 AM). In 1974, WCCM-FM evolved into WCGY, an automated stereo top 40 and oldies station. With a stronger transmitter, it is now branded as a full-market Boston station. The call letters were chosen with the owner in mind, as Curt Gowdy and his children owned and operated the station.

In 1983, WCGY flipped to an oldies format playing hits of the 1950s and 1960s. The station, however, did not perform well in the Boston ratings. Some early to mid 1970s oldies were mixed in by 1984, and by 1985, the 1950s music was gone. The station by then was called "Superhits WCGY". By 1986, the station leaned slightly toward classic rock while still playing mostly music from 1964 to 1974. By 1987, WCGY had evolved to more of a classic rock format and held on to this format until 1994. From 1992 until its demise in 1994, it was called "Rock 93, WCGY".

=== Eagle 93.7 (1994–1999) ===
On September 30, 1994, after the station was sold to American Radio Systems, WCGY became 1970s hits-formatted WEGQ "Eagle 93.7", which then underwent many changes over its five-year existence. Initially, it played music from 1970 to 1979, ranging from classic rock and pop, to disco, novelty and easy listening. As time went on, WEGQ added late 1960s and early 1980s music. The Lost 45s with Barry Scott was moved to WEGQ from sister station WBMX and became a Sunday night staple there before heading to WODS. By 1995, it also leaned toward classic rock. The station's morning show team, Karlson and McKenzie, would later be heard on WZLX. In 1996, WEGQ's transmitter was moved south from Andover to a newly constructed tower in Peabody, which increased the station's signal in Downtown Boston and the South Shore.

Westinghouse Electric Corporation, then-parent company of CBS Radio, announced its acquisition of American Radio Systems in September 1997. As the combined company would have controlled 59 percent of advertising revenues in the Boston market, as well as three of the top five radio stations, in April 1998 the Department of Justice ordered CBS to divest WEGQ, WEEI, WRKO, and WAAF (now WKVB), as well as KSD and KLOU in St. Louis and WOCT in Baltimore, as a condition of its approval of the merger. In August 1998, Entercom announced plans to acquire the four Boston-area stations, along with WWTM (now WVEI), from CBS for $140 million.

=== Star 93.7 (1999–2005) ===
Shortly after the sale was approved, at 10:00 p.m. on March 31, 1999, after playing "You Can't Always Get What You Want" by The Rolling Stones, WEGQ began stunting with a loop of Prince's "1999". At 3:00 p.m. the following day, the station flipped to rhythmic adult contemporary as WQSX, "Star 93.7". The first song on "Star" was "You Dropped a Bomb on Me" by The Gap Band. The format consisted of 1970s and 1980s-soul music, dance music and rhythmic hit music. This format, however, did not catch any fire in the Arbitron ratings, but did have a loyal audience and served a small niche in Boston. During 2001, controversial Survivor: Borneo winner Richard Hatch was a morning host briefly.

=== 93-7 Mike FM (2005–2011) ===
On April 14, 2005, at 2:00 p.m., after playing "Last Dance" by Boston native Donna Summer, WQSX became WMKK, with an adult hits format branded as "93-7 Mike FM". The first song on "Mike" was "Tessie" by The Dropkick Murphys. Inside Radio, a radio industry publication, released information that had this change not taken place, Infinity Broadcasting (as CBS Radio, the group that was prohibited from owning 93.7 itself back in the late 1990s, was known at the time) reportedly would have transformed either WBMX, WZLX, or WODS into Jack FM on April 15, 2005.

Following the Boston Red Sox victory in the 2007 World Series, the station re-branded itself as "Mike Lowell FM" after the third baseman for one day. Similarly, the station paid tribute to Michael Jackson in July 2009 by re-branding themselves as "Michael FM" and playing Jackson's songs for the afternoon on the anniversary of his death.

=== Sports WEEI-FM (2011–present) ===
On September 8, 2011, it was announced that WMKK would begin simulcasting WEEI's sports radio format on September 12, 2011. The switch took place at 6:00 a.m. that day, after the station played Lynyrd Skynyrd's "Free Bird". On September 21, 2011, WMKK changed its call letters to WEEI-FM. On October 4, 2012, WEEI and WEEI-FM split the simulcast; the existing local programming and sports broadcasts remain on WEEI-FM, while AM 850 aired a redirection loop for one day before becoming a full ESPN Radio affiliate on October 5, 2012.

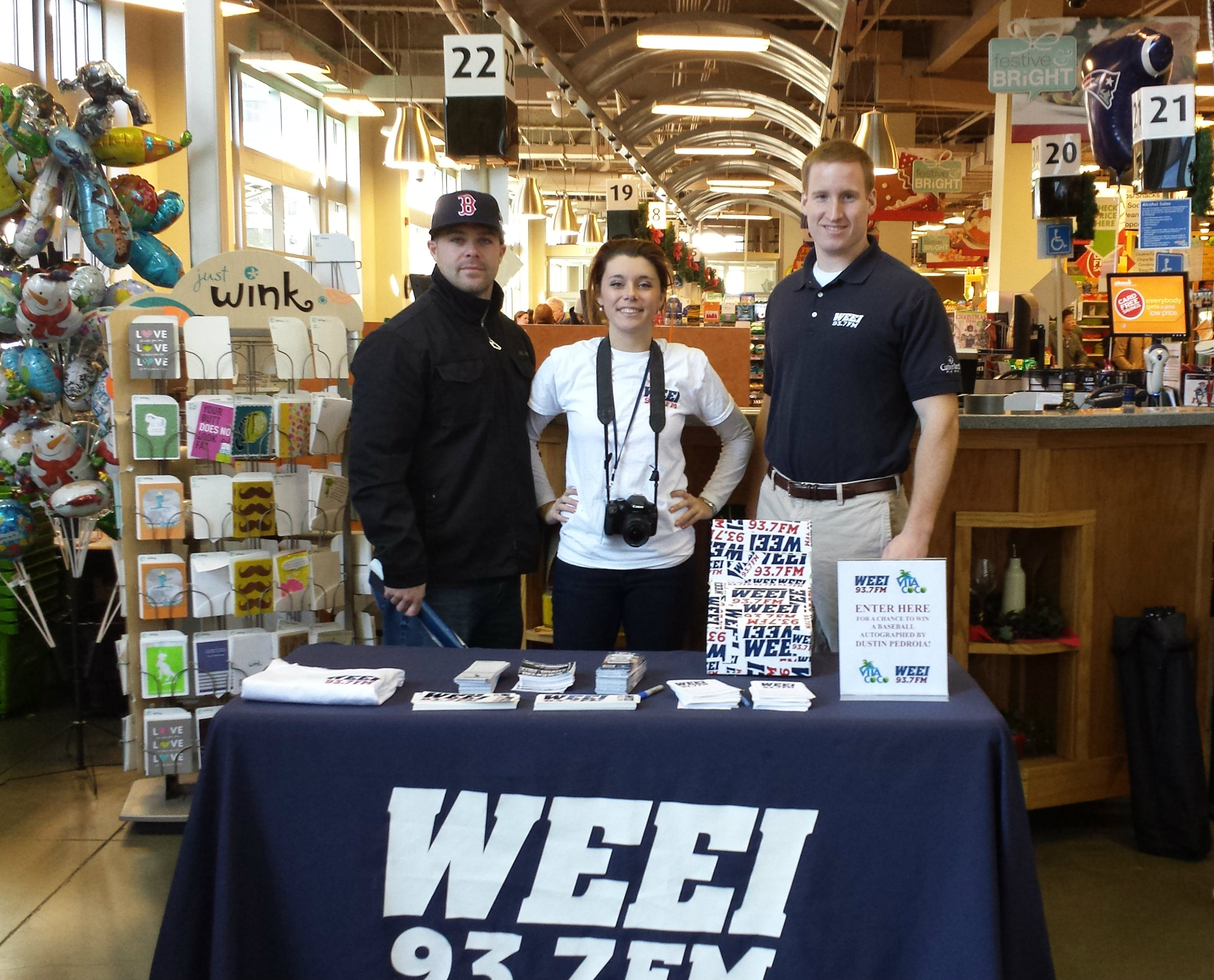
WEEI promotional booth at a supermarket in Boston.

J.T. The Brick's Fox Sports Radio program was added to WEEI-FM's schedule on May 6, 2013. (The program, along with other Fox Sports Radio programming, had moved from WEEI AM to WBZ-FM after WEEI began carrying a partial ESPN Radio schedule in 2009, but was dropped from WBZ-FM following the launch of CBS Sports Radio in January 2013). On August 20, 2013, WEEI-FM announced that it would no longer carry Boston Celtics broadcasts after being unable to reach a new contract with the team. In early 2014, WEEI-FM dropped Fox Sports Radio and began carrying NBC Sports Radio's overnight program, shortly after WUFC (now WMEX) dropped its affiliation with that network. SB Nation Radio's overnight show joined WEEI-FM's schedule in 2019, the move came after NBC Sports Radio eliminated its late night programming. SB Nation Radio was replaced by CBS Sports Radio later that year, after WBZ-FM dropped the latter network to rejoin Fox Sports Radio; Entercom had acquired CBS Sports Radio in its merger with CBS Radio.

The station's HD2 channel carries an active rock format branded as "WAAF", which is also broadcast on the HD2 channel of sister station WWBX. The format and WAAF call letters were formerly used by WKVB (107.3 FM) until its 2020 sale from Entercom to the Educational Media Foundation, with a simulcast on the two HD2 channels (WAAF, in turn, carried WEEI-FM's programming on its HD2). Until 2017, WEEI-FM's HD2 channel simulcast then-sister station WRKO, with WAAF being broadcast on the HD3 channel.

Following a long history of controversial on-air comments, WEEI-FM suspended its daytime live schedule on February 16, 2018, so all employees could undergo mandatory sensitivity training. The tipping point came when afternoon host Christian Fauria was suspended for five days after impersonating Don Yee, the agent for longtime Patriots quarterback Tom Brady, with a stereotyped Asian accent.

== Teams on WEEI ==
=== Boston Red Sox ===
Red Sox broadcasts are a daily feature of the WEEI Red Sox Radio Network slate from March through October. Each broadcast consists of:

- "The Pregame Show" is recorded from an air studio inside Fenway Park next to gate C
- "The Inside Pitch", a segment with a member of the local sports journalism establishment;
- (optional) A pre-game interview with the general manager;
- The game intro itself, a compilation of great moments in Red Sox broadcast history;
- Will Flemming broadcasts the game itself, along with a rotating collection of other broadcasters and analysts, sometimes including on-air personalities from the station. Flemming took over as primary play-by-play personality after Joe Castiglione retired from broadcasting at the end of the 2024 season. Prior to the 2007 season, Castiglione was partnered with long-time co-broadcaster Jerry Trupiano. Prior to the 2016 season, Castiglione's partner was Dave O'Brien, who moved to the New England Sports Network to replace the fired long-time TV play-by-play broadcaster Don Orsillo.
- A post-game interview;
- Post-game statistics (called "totals");
- A highlights clip for those who missed the early part of the game;
- A roundup of out of town scores; and
- A signoff tag.

During game broadcasts, WEEI-FM is also made available through the Major League Baseball web site (for a fee), and (for home games) on XM Satellite Radio (as part of the standard service) for those outside the Boston listening area. The entire 162-game Red Sox schedule also may be heard on an extensive radio network throughout the six New England states. Many of the smaller stations have always aired the Red Sox Network regardless of what Boston station originated those broadcasts.

In 2006, the Boston Red Sox signed a 10-year radio deal with WRKO (also owned by Entercom at the time) for the broadcast rights for the 2007 through 2016 seasons, worth a reportedly $13 million a season. About 30 Red Sox games a season, including all games on Wednesday nights and all weekly day games were heard on WEEI as part of the deal. As of August 26, 2009, WEEI once again became the flagship station for the Red Sox. This occurred two weeks after the debut of competitor WBZ-FM "The Sports Hub" and was seen as a reaction, focusing all Red Sox games on one station, WEEI, rather than splitting them between the station and WRKO.

=== Boston Celtics ===
Sean Grande hosted the Celtics Tonight pregame show before each Celtics game on WEEI-FM in addition to providing the play by play for the game. Cedric Maxwell provided color commentary during the broadcast. The broadcast duo called themselves "Grande and Max". John Ryder hosted the halftime show and the Celtics Rewind show following the game.

On August 20, 2013, Entercom announced that it had been unable to come to terms on a new agreement to air the Celtics for the 2013-2014 season. Celtics broadcasts then moved to WBZ-FM.

== WEEI/NESN Radio-Telethon ==
Each year since 2002, New England Sports Network (NESN) and WEEI have teamed up to raise money for The Jimmy Fund by holding a Radio-Telethon. For two days every August the event is simulcast on WEEI and NESN. WEEI radio personalities conduct auctions and interviews with cancer patients and survivors, doctors, athletes and celebrities. Since 2002, this event has raised around $45 million for the Jimmy Fund and has received donations from all 50 states.

== Simulcast network ==
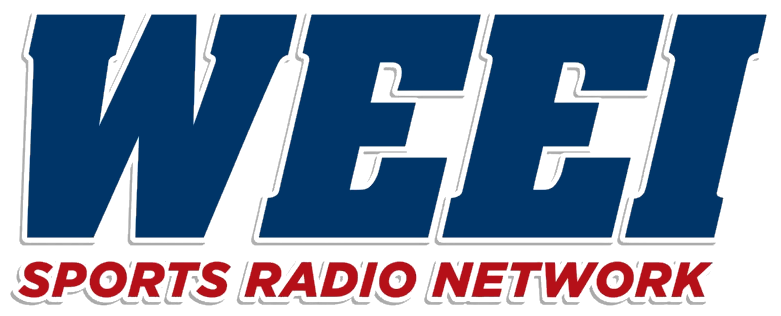
WEEI Sports Radio Network logo

A number of other stations in the New England region carry most of WEEI-FM's local programming. The stations are branded as "Sports Radio WEEI", and many carry call letters similar to the Boston flagship station. Four of the eight network affiliates are directly owned by Audacy.

WEEI-FM's sports play-by-play broadcasts are distributed separately, though some games originated by WEEI may air on some of the other affiliated stations by way of a separate deal. Some of the stations have picked up play-by-play rights in concert with WEEI after their conversion to the simulcast. Most stations carry either ESPN Radio or Fox Sports Radio when the flagship station carries games or when WEEI-FM is not airing local programming.

WEEI Sports Radio Network stations
Call sign	Frequency	City of license	Owner	Network status
WEEI-FM*	93.7 FM	Lawrence–Boston, Massachusetts	Audacy, Inc.	Flagship
WEII	96.3 FM	Dennis, Massachusetts	iHeartMedia, Inc.	Affiliate
WPEI	95.9 FM	Saco–Portland, Maine	Atlantic Coast Radio	Affiliate
WPPI	95.5 FM	Topsham–Portland, Maine	Atlantic Coast Radio	Affiliate
WTSV	1230 AM	Claremont, New Hampshire	Great Eastern Radio, LLC	Affiliate
W232DN	94.3 FM	Claremont, New Hampshire	Great Eastern Radio, LLC	WTSV relay
W233CC	94.5 FM	White River Junction, Vermont	Great Eastern Radio, LLC	WTSV relay
WVEI	1440 AM	Worcester, Massachusetts	Audacy, Inc.	Affiliate
WWEI*	105.5 FM	Easthampton–Springfield, Massachusetts	Audacy, Inc.	Affiliate

- Asterisk (*) indicates HD Radio broadcast.

=== Network formulation and past affiliates ===
When WEEI (590 AM) formally relaunched as an all-sports station in September 1991, WEEI's then-owner, the Boston Celtics, signed a lease agreement with Zapis Communications to carry WEEI programming full-time on Zapis's AM station in Worcester, WFTQ. This arrangement replaced a previous simulcast of co-owned WAAF (107.3 FM) on WFTQ after Zapis shut down local operations earlier in the year; the WEEI simulcast on WFTQ commenced with the WVEI call sign. After Zapis sold the renamed WWTM to American Radio Systems along with WAAF in 1996, it reincorporated WEEI programming into its lineup in 1997, and in 2000 reclaimed the WVEI call sign. WWRX-FM 103.7 in Westerly, Rhode Island (serving Providence), was acquired from Phoenix Media/Communications Group in 2004, and was renamed WEEI-FM; it became WVEI-FM in 2011 to accommodate WEEI's move to FM in Boston. What is now WWEI was purchased from Vox Radio Group in 2006.

Entercom's initial plan to syndicate WEEI programming to non-Entercom stations was to place it on eleven New England stations owned by Nassau Broadcasting. The plan, announced on August 16, 2007, followed reports that Nassau was planning to use its WCRB (99.5 FM) as the flagship for a regional sports network featuring Dennis and Callahan, which was on hiatus from WEEI at the time during stalled contractual negotiations; the deal would have seen Entercom acquire a 50-percent interest in WCRB, which was to retain its classical music format, for $10 million. The Nassau-owned affiliates would not have aired Red Sox and Celtics broadcasts or Patriots Monday. The deal between Nassau and Entercom ended up collapsing by January 2008; one of the stations involved, WWHQ (101.5 FM) in Meredith, New Hampshire, joined the WEEI network as WZEI on January 4, 2013, after Nassau sold its stations.

The first of WEEI's eventual affiliates began airing its programming in September 2008. WPPI, one of the first affiliates, initially carried WEEI programming (as WGEI) from September 2008 until April 2009, when it began simulcasting talk station WLOB; it rejoined the network in August 2011. Additionally, WAEI (910 AM and 97.1 FM) in Bangor, Maine, carried WEEI programming from September 2008 until January 2010, when Blueberry Broadcasting terminated its affiliation following a breach-of-contract dispute. WZEI left the network on July 1, 2020, when it became soft adult contemporary station WWLK-FM. For a period of time after Entercom's merger with CBS Radio in November 2017, WRCH (100.5 FM) in New Britain–Hartford, Connecticut, offered a WEEI simulcast on its third HD Radio channel; the channel had previously simulcast CBS-owned WBZ-FM, which was divested to Beasley Broadcast Group.

On January 21, 2026, Audacy announced that it would sell WVEI-FM to Ocean State Media, for use as the new home for its Rhode Island-focused public radio service. Audacy disclosed its intention to find a new affiliate for WEEI programming in Providence; in the interim, WWBB became the Providence affiliate of the Red Sox Radio Network (while retaining its existing classic hits format) on May 1, 2026, the day Ocean State Media took over 103.7 as WPVD-FM. WEEY in Swanzey–Keene, New Hampshire, which had been one of the original affiliates in 2008, switched to a country music format in June 2026.
