= WROL =

Religious radio station in Boston

- Boston, Massachusetts; United States
- Broadcast area: Greater Boston
- Frequency: 950 kHz
- Branding: AM 950 WROL

Programming
- Language: English
- Format: Christian radio
- Affiliations: Salem Radio Network

Ownership
- Owner: Salem Media Group; (Salem Media of Massachusetts, LLC)
- Sister stations: WEZE

History
- Founded: January 29, 1927
- First air date: October 8, 1950
- Former call signs: WBSO (1927–35); WORL (1935–49; 1950–66); WRYT (1966–78)
- Former frequencies: 1240 kHz (1927); 780 kHz (1927–29); 920 kHz (1929–41)
- Call sign meaning: Similar to former WORL calls currently being used at its sister station in Orlando

Technical information
- Licensing authority: FCC
- Facility ID: 9139
- Class: D
- Power: 5,000 watts (day); 90 watts (night)
- Transmitter coordinates: 42°26′9.35″N 70°59′33.16″W
- Translator: 100.3 W262CV (Boston)

Links
- Public license information: Public file; LMS
- Webcast: Listen live; Listen live (via Audacy)
- Website: wrolradio.com

WROL (950 AM) is a radio station in Boston, Massachusetts. The station is owned by Salem Media Group. Most of WROL's programming is religious including local ministers as well as national radio hosts such as Dr. Charles Stanley, Jay Sekulow and Eric Metaxas. Former WBZ-TV news anchor-turned-minister Liz Walker also has a program on the station. WROL also airs several Irish music blocks on weekends, including the Irish Hit Parade on Saturdays and A Feast of Irish Music on Sundays.

WROL operates with 5,000 watts by day but must reduce power to 90 watts at night to protect other stations on 950 kHz. WROL uses a non-directional transmitter located off Route 107 in the Rumney Marsh Reservation in Saugus, Massachusetts. WROL is one of two religious formatted radio stations in the Boston media market owned by Salem Media Group; WEZE is the other.

== History ==
WROL's history dates back to 1927 and WBSO, owned by Babson College. The station moved to Boston in 1935 after a sale and became WORL. During the late 1930s, WORL was the first station in Boston to adopt a popular-music format ("The 920 Club", named after the station's former frequency; the title remained even after the move to 950 on March 29, 1941) with disc jockeys spinning the tunes. Although only a daytimer then, WORL built up a following as an entertaining alternative to the daytime programming elsewhere on the Boston radio dial.

The owners, Harold A. Lafount and two others (operating for the interests of Arde Bulova) became embroiled in a long-running dispute with the Federal Communications Commission (FCC) for having filed false reports regarding ownership and financial structure, and in 1947 their license renewal was rejected. After an appeals process that went to the U.S. Supreme Court, the rejection was upheld. The station, which had stayed on the air via temporary licenses, went off the air on May 30, 1949.

Pilgrim Broadcasting purchased the license and returned the station to the air in October 1950. Later sales led to the station becoming WRYT, with WORL being taken by a station near Orlando, Florida. Carter Broadcasting took over in 1977, and after failing to be able to return the WORL call letters to Boston, settled on WROL. Carter immediately established a religious network with WROL as its flagship, with relays throughout New England. While mostly religious, WROL featured two popular programs during the 1970s and 1980s, a weekday cooking show with longtime Boston radio/TV personality Gus Saunders, and a Saturday block of Irish music featuring John Latchford, and later Paul Sullivan, which remains extremely popular among the region's large Irish-American population. In April 2025, Paul Sullivan celebrated his 43rd year as host of the Irish Hit Parade, one of the longest continuous tenures in Boston radio history. In recent years, WROL has expanded Irish music to Sunday afternoons as well.

In 2001, as part of Carter Broadcasting dismantling its network and focusing its attention to WCRN in Worcester, the station was sold to Salem Communications.

== History of call letters ==
The call letters WROL were previously assigned to an AM station in Knoxville, Tennessee.

WROL (620 AM) in Knoxville in the early 1940s employed a then-little-known news announcer who went on to country stardom: Tennessee Ernie Ford. WROL's complete 1,000 watt radio transmitter and wire-array antenna was hand built by the station engineer Joseph Wofford. The original transmitter was later encased in a glass cabinet and placed in the lobby of the studio.

== Translator ==
Broadcast translator for WROL
Call sign	Frequency	City of license	FID	ERP (W)	Class	Transmitter coordinates	FCC info
W262CV	100.3 FM	Boston, Massachusetts	145583	45	D	42°14′49.1″N 71°2′53.5″W	LMS
