= WLOB =

- Portland, Maine; United States
- Broadcast area: Portland metropolitan area
- Frequency: 1310 kHz
- Branding: News–Talk WLOB 100.5 FM 1310 AM

Programming
- Format: News–talk
- Affiliations: Fox News Radio; Westwood One; Premiere Networks; Salem Radio Network; University of Maine Black Bears Network

Ownership
- Owner: Atlantic Coast Radio
- Sister stations: WJJB-FM; WPEI; WPPI; WRED

History
- First air date: February 2, 1957
- Call sign meaning: Lobster (Lobster fishing is a major industry in Maine)

Technical information
- Licensing authority: FCC
- Facility ID: 9202
- Class: B
- Power: 5,000 watts
- Transmitter coordinates: 43°41′22.29″N 70°20′3.18″W
- Translators: 98.3 W252EI (Brunswick); 100.5 W263BZ (Portland)

Links
- Public license information: Public file; LMS
- Webcast: Listen live
- Website: www.wlobradio.com

WLOB (1310 AM) is a commercial radio station licensed to Portland, Maine. The station is owned by Atlantic Coast Radio and airs a talk radio format. The studios and transmitter are on Warren Avenue in Portland. WLOB transmits with 5,000 watts using a directional antenna to protect other stations on its frequency.

Programming on WLOB is also heard on FM translators W263BZ on 100.5 MHz in Portland and W252EI on 98.3 MHz in Brunswick.

== Programming ==
Weekdays begin a local news and interview show, hosted by Ray Richardson, which is also carried on several other AM stations in Maine. The weekday schedule continues with nationally syndicated conservative talk show hosts including Mike Gallagher, Sean Hannity, Joe Pags, Chris Plante and America in The Morning. Sports programming includes University of Maine Black Bears college football and hockey.

A portion of The Ray Richardson Show was simulcast on Portland's MyNetworkTV affiliate, WPME, from September 2009 to June 2013. Until March 2009, the entire program (as The Fox Morning News) was simulcast on Portland's Fox affiliate, WPFO.

Most hours begin with national news from Fox News Radio.

== History ==
WLOB first signed on the air on February 2, 1957. During the late 1960s and early 1970s, WLOB was a popular Top 40 music station, competing with WJBQ (1440 AM) in nearby Westbrook. During this time, McGavern/Guild Media NYC owned WLOB as Atlantic States Industries, which also owned WTSA in Brattleboro, Vermont; WNVY in Pensacola, Florida; and WRYT in Boston.

By about 1979 or 1980, as Top 40 listening began shifting to FM, WLOB switched to a brokered Christian talk and teaching format. In the late 1990s, it added a simulcast on 96.3 FM in Rumford, WLOB-FM. This was the third incarnation of WLOB-FM; previous versions included 97.9 (now occupied by WJBQ) in the 1960s and an AOR-formatted 100.9 (now occupied by WYNZ) from 1978 to 1980.

In 2000, WLOB and WLOB-FM were sold to Atlantic Coast Radio by Carter Broadcasting. The stations subsequently dropped their religious programming and picked up a news-talk. In 2006, WLOB-FM relocated its transmitter from western Maine to South Paris to provide a clearer signal to the Portland area. Following the transmitter move, in 2008, WLOB-FM changed its city of license from Rumford to Gray.

On August 25, 2008, WLOB-FM was converted to a simulcast of WJJB (the former WJBQ AM), resulting in WLOB's programming being heard only on the AM signal. This was part of a shuffle of Atlantic Coast Radio's FM stations as a result of the conversion of two of its stations, including WJJB-FM 95.5, on September 1, 2008 to simulcasts of WEEI. Shortly after the completion of these format changes, 95.5's call letters were changed to WGEI (it had initially planned to use the WTEI call sign, and for a week in September 2008 used the WUEI call letters). On April 1, 2009, WGEI converted to a simulcast of WLOB; it became WLOB-FM a few days later. In August 2011, WLOB-FM once again began airing programming from WEEI as WPPI, leaving the talk programming only on AM 1310.

In March 2016, WLOB's programming again returned to the FM dial in the Portland area, this time on an FM translator, 100.5 W263BZ.

== Translators ==
Call sign	Frequency	City of license	FID	ERP (W)	Class	Transmitter coordinates	FCC info
W252EI	98.3 FM	Brunswick, Maine	202215	15	D	43°54′12″N 70°2′11″W	LMS
W263BZ	100.5 FM	Portland, Maine	150133	250	D	43°44′38.3″N 70°19′59.2″W	LMS
