= WOKQ =

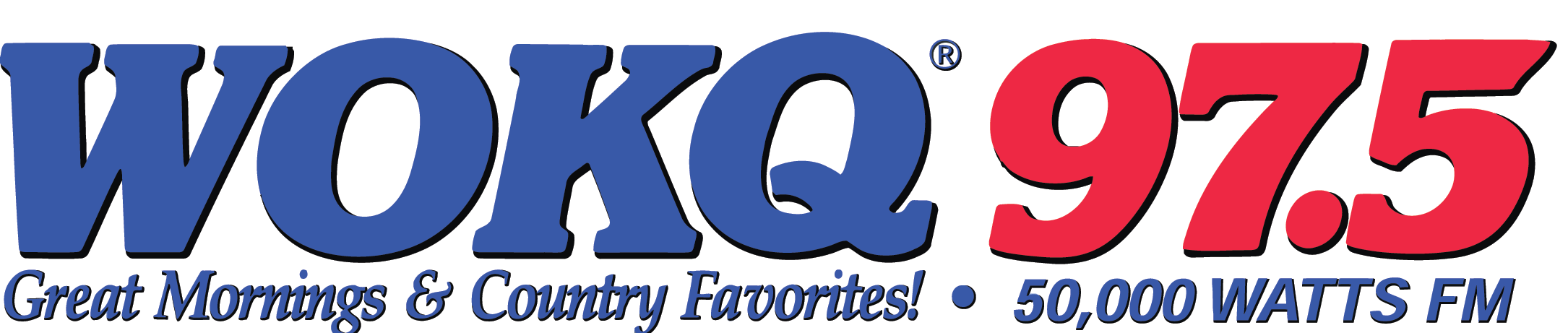
- Dover, New Hampshire; United States
- Broadcast area: Seacoast Region, New Hampshire; Manchester, New Hampshire
- Frequency: 97.5 MHz
- Branding: The Big 97-5 WOKQ

Programming
- Format: Country
- Affiliations: Compass Media Networks; Westwood One

Ownership
- Owner: Townsquare Media; (Townsquare License, LLC)
- Sister stations: WSAK/WSHK; WPKQ

History
- First air date: August 1970 (as WDNH)
- Former call signs: WDNH (1970–1977)

Technical information
- Licensing authority: FCC
- Facility ID: 22887
- Class: B
- ERP: 50,000 watts
- HAAT: 150 meters (490 ft)
- Transmitter coordinates: 43.224°N 70.971°W
- Translator: 97.9 W250AB (Manchester)

Links
- Public license information: Public file; LMS
- Webcast: Listen live
- Website: wokq.com

WOKQ (97.5 FM) is a radio station broadcasting a country music format. The station serves the Merrimack Valley, the New Hampshire Seacoast, and York County, Maine, including the cities of Manchester and Portsmouth.

The transmitter is located in Barrington, New Hampshire, with the station's city of license being Dover, New Hampshire. The studios are located in Dover. WOKQ also operates a simulcast on W250AB on 97.9, a translator that fills in signal holes in downtown Manchester. It brands itself as "The Big 97.5".

WOKQ is owned by Townsquare Media. At 50,000 watts of power, its broadcast signal can reach most of southern and central New Hampshire, southern Maine and northeastern Massachusetts clearly.

== History ==
WOKQ was put on the air in August 1970 by Eastminster Broadcasting Company under the call letters WDNH. Its country format was in place by 1972. Eastminster sold WDNH to Fuller-Jeffrey Broadcasting in 1977, at which point it became WOKQ. Fuller-Jeffrey was sold to Citadel Broadcasting in 1999. Citadel merged with Cumulus Media on September 16, 2011.

On August 30, 2013, a deal was announced in which Townsquare Media would acquire 53 Cumulus stations, including WOKQ and WPKQ, for $238 million. The deal was part of Cumulus' acquisition of Dial Global; Townsquare and Dial Global were both controlled by Oaktree Capital Management. The sale to Townsquare was completed on November 14, 2013.

== Translator ==
WOKQ also broadcasts on the following translator:

Broadcast translator for WOKQ
Call sign	Frequency	City of license	FID	ERP (W)	HAAT	Class	Transmitter coordinates	FCC info
W250AB	97.9 FM	Manchester, New Hampshire	22889	250	34 m (112 ft)	D	43°0′58″N 71°28′48″W	LMS
