= WCYY =

Coordinates: 43.544°N 70.404°W

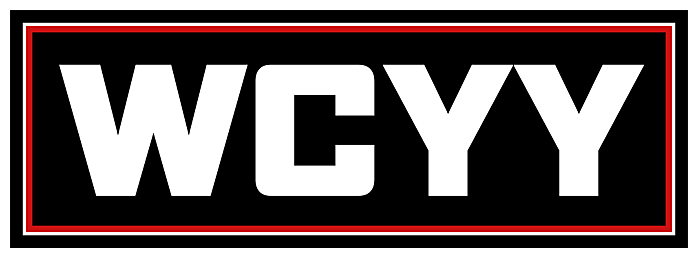
- Biddeford, Maine; United States
- Broadcast area: Portland metropolitan area
- Frequency: 94.3 MHz
- Branding: WCYY

Programming
- Format: Active rock; alternative rock

Ownership
- Owner: Townsquare Media; (Townsquare License, LLC)
- Sister stations: WBLM; WHOM; WJBQ; WPKQ

History
- First air date: August 1972
- Former call signs: WIDE-FM (1972–1981); WBYC (1981–1985); WYJY (1985–1991); WSTG (1991–1994)

Technical information
- Licensing authority: FCC
- Facility ID: 22880
- Class: B1
- ERP: 11,500 watts
- HAAT: 147 meters (482 ft)
- Repeater: 103.7 WPKQ (North Conway, New Hampshire)

Links
- Public license information: Public file; LMS
- Webcast: Listen live
- Website: wcyy.com

WCYY (94.3 FM) is a commercial radio station licensed to Biddeford, Maine, and serving the Portland metropolitan area. Its target audience are men between 18 and 44. The station airs an active/alternative rock radio format and is owned by Townsquare Media. WCYY studios are at One City Center in Portland.

WCYY has an effective radiated power (ERP) of 11,500 watts. The transmitter is on Cascade Road in Saco, Maine. WCYY is simulcast on WPKQ (103.7 FM) in North Conway, New Hampshire, which transmits from Mount Washington and covers a large swath of northern New England.

== History ==
=== WIDE-FM, WBYC, WYJY and WSTG ===
The station signed on the air in August 1972 as WIDE-FM. It simulcast the middle of the road programming of its sister station WIDE (1400 AM; now WVAE). The stations were owned by Hoy Communications and were affiliates of the ABC Information Radio Network.

WIDE-FM became WBYC ("We're Beautiful York County") on March 1, 1981, adopting a beautiful music format. The station was mostly automated and played quarter-hour sweeps of instrumental cover versions of pop hits, Broadway and Hollywood show tunes. On December 2, 1985, WBYC became WYJY, playing soft adult contemporary music as "Joy 94.3". WYJY changed its call letters to WSTG on January 28, 1991, moving to a bit more upbeat adult contemporary format as "Star 94.3".

=== WCYY ===
On July 8, 1994, WSTG flipped to adult album alternative and changed its call sign to WCYY. After a while, WCYY shifted to modern rock, the format it still plays today. Prior to June 2007, WCYY was simulcast on 93.9 WCYI in Lewiston, Maine. That station was later bought by the Educational Media Foundation and switched to Christian contemporary music as part of the Air1 network. On February 21, 2008, WCYY moved to a new studio.

On August 30, 2013, a deal was announced in which Townsquare Media would acquire 53 Cumulus Media stations, including WCYY, for $238 million. The deal was part of Cumulus' acquisition of Dial Global; both Townsquare and Dial Global were both controlled by Oaktree Capital Management. The sale to Townsquare was completed on November 14, 2013.

WCYY is one of six alternative stations owned by Townsquare Media (another being Hudson Valley's WRRV, also acquired from Cumulus Media).

=== Simulcast ===
WCYY began simulcasting on WPKQ (103.7 FM) in North Conway, New Hampshire, and WJZN (1400 AM and 95.9 FM) in Augusta, Maine, on October 25, 2021. The expansion, which resulted in WCYY's programming being heard in much of northern New England (in part because of WPKQ's transmitter on Mount Washington), was promoted as "WCYY 3.0". (Note: In May 2023, Townsquare took WJZN silent for economic reasons.)

The simulcast coincided with the syndication launch of Toucher and Rich from WBZ-FM in Boston. The three WCYY stations, along with Bangor sister station 92.9 WEZQ, became the program's first four affiliates. WCYY and WPKQ dropped Toucher and Rich in October 2023, returning to a locally-originated music-focused morning show.
