= WHOM =

Radio station in the United States

Coordinates: 44.270°N 71.304°W

- Mount Washington, New Hampshire; United States
- Broadcast area: Portland metropolitan area and Northern New England
- Frequency: 94.9 MHz
- Branding: 94.9 H-O-M

Programming
- Format: Adult contemporary
- Affiliations: Compass Media Networks

Ownership
- Owner: Townsquare Media; (Townsquare License, LLC)
- Sister stations: WBLM; WCYY; WJBQ; WPKQ

History
- First air date: July 9, 1958
- Former call signs: WMTW-FM (1958–1972); WWMT (1972–1973); WMTQ (1973–1976)
- Call sign meaning: "We're High On the Mountain"

Technical information
- Licensing authority: FCC
- Facility ID: 49687
- Class: C
- ERP: 50,000 watts
- HAAT: 1,141 metres (3,743 ft)

Links
- Public license information: Public file; LMS
- Webcast: Listen live
- Website: 949whom.com

WHOM (94.9 FM, "94.9 H-O-M") is an American radio station which airs an adult contemporary radio format. WHOM is owned by Townsquare Media and transmits from atop Mount Washington, New Hampshire, its community of license. The station primarily targets the Portland, Maine area, but due to the high elevation of Mount Washington, can be heard across a much wider area of Maine and New Hampshire, northern and central Vermont, and parts of southern Quebec, northeastern Massachusetts and the Adirondacks of upstate New York.

== History ==
=== WMTW-FM ===
The station that is today WHOM signed on the air July 9, 1958, as WMTW-FM. Along with WMTW-TV (channel 8), which had signed on in 1954, WMTW-FM was owned by Mount Washington Television, an ownership group that included former Maine governor Horace Hildreth. For most of its early years, WMTW-FM broadcast a beautiful music format, featuring quarter-hour sweeps of mostly soft instrumentals, with limited talking and commercials.

The WMTW stations were sold to Jack Paar of Tonight Show fame in 1963. Jack Paar, in turn, sold WMTW-FM-TV to Mid New York Broadcasting in 1967. In 1971, Mid New York sold WMTW-FM to Alpine Broadcasting while retaining the TV station.

With the ownership change, the radio station switched its call letters to WWMT in 1972, then to WMTQ in 1973, and then finally to WHOM in 1976. The station offered an easy listening format consisting of instrumental versions of pop songs from artists like Henry Mancini, Ray Conniff, Percy Faith, Chet Atkins, and Herb Alpert, as well as several soft vocals per hour like The Carpenters, Dionne Warwick, Johnny Mathis, and Perry Como. This format continued through the 1980s.

=== WHOM ===
In January 1990, WHOM dropped the easy listening music for a soft adult contemporary format, dubbed "soft and easy favorites" by the station. It continued to market itself as an easy listening station and retained its air staff. In the mid 1990s, the station began adding softer songs by contemporary hit artists and began playing current product. By 2000, WHOM was more of a mainstream adult contemporary station.

The station was sold to Fuller-Jeffrey Broadcasting by Barnstable Broadcasting in 1996. Fuller-Jeffrey then sold most of its stations, including WHOM, to Citadel Broadcasting in 1999. Citadel merged with Cumulus Media on September 16, 2011.

On August 30, 2013, a deal was announced in which Townsquare Media would acquire 53 Cumulus stations, including WHOM, for $238 million. The deal was part of Cumulus' acquisition of Dial Global; Townsquare and Dial Global were both controlled by Oaktree Capital Management. The sale to Townsquare was completed on November 14, 2013.
