= Sports radio =

Radio format

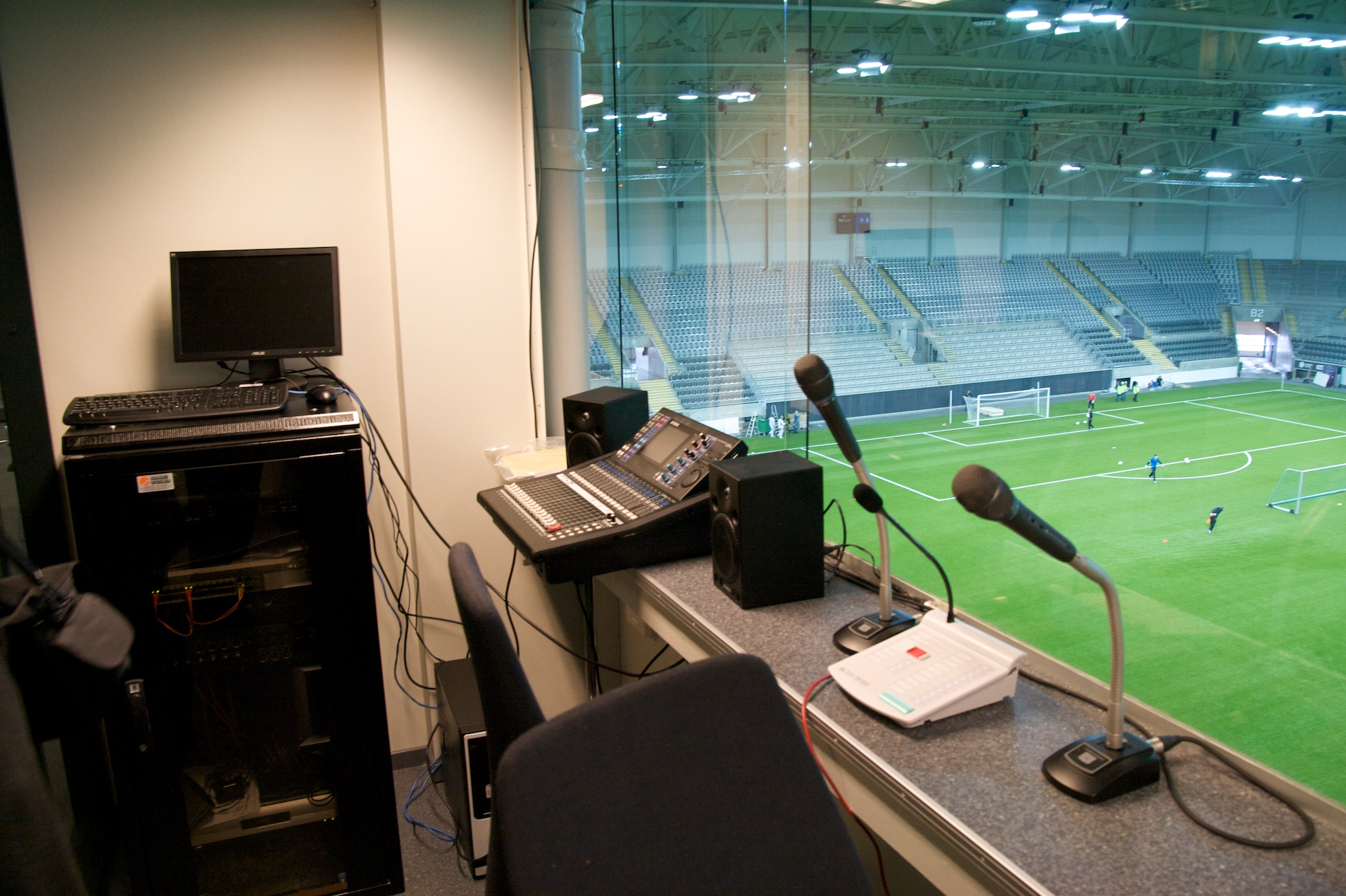
Sports commentary box at Unity Arena

Sports radio (or sports talk radio) is a radio format devoted entirely to discussion and broadcasting of sporting events. A widespread programming genre that has a narrow audience appeal, sports radio is characterized by an often-boisterous on-air style and extensive debate and analysis by both hosts and callers. Many sports talk stations also carry play-by-play (live commentary) of local sports teams as part of their regular programming.

== History ==
The Liberty Broadcasting System was the first radio network in the United States to focus on sports. Its cornerstone programming was play-by-play of Major League Baseball broadcasts, some reconstructed from wire reports. Launched in 1948, the network collapsed in 1952 after MLB substantially raised its rights fee and imposed untenable restrictions on the network's operations.

In 1955, WHN New York launched the first regular sports talk program featuring a broadcaster/journalist roundtable that aired before and after Brooklyn Dodgers games. By the early 1960s, sports talk content, ranging from individual commentary to roundtable discussions, began appearing in major US markets, initially tied to play-by-play broadcasts but gradually developing unique styles and characters. Art Rust Jr. launched New York's first interactive call-in show (WMCA) in 1960 to limited initial success. Nonetheless, the interactive format spread in the 1960s with Bill Mazer, launching the first successful show in March 1964 at WNBC (AM) in New York. Soon after WNBC launched its program, in 1965 Seton Hall University's radio station, WSOU, started Hall Line, a call-in sports radio talk show focusing on the team's basketball program. Having celebrated its 50th anniversary on air during the 2015–2016 season, Hall Line, which broadcasts to central and northern New Jersey as well as all five boroughs of New York, is the oldest and longest running sports talk call-in show in the NY-NJ Metropolitan area, and is believed to be the oldest in the nation.

Enterprise Radio Network became the first national all-sports network, operating out of Avon, Connecticut, from New Year's Day 1981 through late September of that year before going out of business. ER had two channels, one for talk and a second for updates and play-by-play. It was founded by ESPN's estranged founder Bill Rasmussen. ER's talk lineup included current New York Yankees voice John Sterling, New York Mets radio host Ed Coleman and former big-league pitcher Bill Denehy.

Emmis Broadcasting's WFAN in New York in 1987 is considered to be the first all-sports radio station, with Philadelphia's WIP a close second. However, that designation is imprecise according to research by Rowan University media scholar Emil Steiner since both stations relied on non-sports content during their initial years in order to survive: It wasn't until WFAN hired Don Imus—a shock jock "who by all accounts despised sports," that the station became financially viable. The prevailing narrative across news coverage was that sports talk radio works when it focuses on entertainment first and information second. This was the model espoused by WIP's manager of programming Tom Bigby: "'If you do sports talk, it won't survive,' Bigby says. 'If you do sports entertainment, the possibilities are endless.'" Following the success of the WIP and WFAN in the early 1990s, with hit programs such as Mike and the Mad Dog, drove other stations in United States to try the all-sports talk format. By 1991 there were around 20 stations broadcasting across the country and by 2000 there were over 600. While only one other radio show besides Mike and the Mad Dog attended the 1990 Super Bowl, about 100 attended the 2004 Super Bowl's radio row.

== Programming ==
The programming of a sports radio station consists primarily of talk-based programming with a focus on sports (either in general, a specific league, or in some cases a specific local team), including news and headlines, analysis, and interviews. These shows are usually hosted by local sportswriters and media personalities, or current and former players and personnel (such as coaches). The flagship programming of a sports radio station is typically live, play-by-play coverage of sporting events, including local teams and nationally syndicated broadcasts.

In the United States, most sports radio stations are usually affiliated with one or more sports radio networks (such as ESPN Radio, Fox Sports Radio, Sports Byline USA, or Westwood One Sports, and the Spanish-language Fútbol de Primera and TUDN Radio), which provide a dayparted lineup of national programming that can fill in gaps in the schedule not filled by local programming, and may also include national play-by-play rights of their own. Among the national networks, morning drive time programs are usually considered their flagship programs, while less-prominent programs are carried in the afternoon and evening in order to accommodate pre-emptions for local shows and play-by-play. Somewhat unusually for radio, the late-night and overnight hosts have more prominence on a sports talk network, due to a near-complete lack of local preemption.

Some national play-by-play packages are distributed via syndicators such as Westwood One and the Sports USA Radio Network (both known for their coverage of the National Football League), and NASCAR's Motor Racing Network (MRN) and Performance Racing Network (PRN). Professional and college teams similarly use a network model for distribution, with one or more flagship stations, and affiliates within other parts of the team's market (which may or may not be a sports-specific station).

Sports radio stations typically depend on drawing an audience that fits advertiser-friendly key demographics, particularly young men with the disposable income to invest in sports fandom. Sports radio stations typically get their largest audiences from live coverage of major league franchises and college sports teams; less prominent stations (especially on the AM dial) may not have this option because of poorer (or for daytime-only stations, non-existent) nighttime signals and smaller budgets for rights fees. Some sports stations (either for budgetary reasons, or to serve as a companion to a sister station devoted primarily to local programs) may serve simply as a passthrough for a network's daily lineup and other syndicated programming, and originate few local programs of their own.

Some sports leagues place restrictions on how their radio broadcasts (at both the local and national level) may be distributed via internet radio, although some leagues have since loosened these restrictions in order to widen their audiences amid the growth and ubiquity of digital platforms. Sports talk programs can be syndicated as podcasts and vodcasts with relative ease, and sports teams have also launched their own online digital networks with sports talk centered around their own properties. Some television sports channels have featured video simulcasts of sports talk programs as part of their programming (including ESPN Radio shows, and syndicated shows such as The Dan Patrick Show). Some shows such as CJCL's Tim & Sid, and The Pat McAfee Show began as radio shows, but eventually migrated to video- and television-oriented formats.

Following the 2018 repeal of the United States' Professional and Amateur Sports Protection Act of 1992, a variant of the format focusing upon sports betting began to emerge. In August 2019, SportsMap (then SB Nation Radio) and Vegas Stats & Information Network (VSiN) launched the BetR Network with affiliates in Las Vegas and Atlantic City at launch, while Philadelphia's WDAS flipped to a sports format featuring local programs involving sports betting. Audacy began to deploy its BetQL Network (now the BetMGM Network) to more of its stations in June 2021 using the on-air brand The Bet, alongside an expansion of their daily schedule. Stations with such formats may still affiliate with a mainstream sports radio network to fill the remainder of their schedule, with the aforementioned WDAS otherwise carrying Fox Sports Radio and Philadelphia Union soccer, and BetMGM being often carried alongside Westwood One Sports on its owned-and-operated stations. In Australia, some sports stations are similarly devoted primarily to horse and greyhound racing.

== Sports talk stations ==
=== Terrestrial ===
==== Australia ====
- RSN Racing & Sport - Melbourne, Victoria
- 1116 SEN - Melbourne, Victoria
- 91.3 SportFM - Fremantle, Western Australia
- Sky Sports Radio - Sydney
- ABC Sport - national, via DAB+ digital radio

==== Belgium ====
- VivaSport - national, via DAB+ digital radio; simulcast of VivaCité

==== Brazil ====
- Rádio Grenal FM - 95.9 MHz - Porto Alegre, Rio Grande do Sul - Regional sports news and talk radio in Rio Grande do Sul. Its owned by Rede Pampa de Comunicação.

==== Canada ====
Call sign	Branding	Ownership	City	Province
CKJR	Sports 1440	Stingray Radio	Edmonton & Wetaskiwin	Alberta
CFAC	Sportsnet 960	Rogers Communications	Calgary	Alberta
CFGO	TSN Radio 1200	Bell Media	Ottawa	Ontario
CISL	Sportsnet 650	Rogers Communications	Vancouver	British Columbia
CKGM	TSN Radio 690	Bell Media	Montreal	Quebec
CJCL	Sportsnet 590	Rogers Communications	Toronto	Ontario
CHUM	TSN Radio 1050	Bell Media	Toronto	Ontario

==== China ====
- Beijing Tiyu Guangbo

==== Colombia ====
- AS Radio Colombia

==== Czech Republic ====
- ČRo Radiožurnál Sport - national, via DAB+ digital radio

==== France ====
- RMC - national, broadcast area in France and Monaco; combination of news/talk/sport format

==== Greece ====
- ERA Sport
- Bwin Sport FM 94.6
- Ellada Sports

==== Hungary ====
- Nemzeti Sportrádió

==== Italy ====
- Rai Radio 1 Sport - national, via DAB+ digital radio

==== Mexico ====
- W Deportes
- RG La Deportiva

==== Netherlands ====
- NPO Radio 1 - national; combination of news/talk/sport format
- GPR Sportradio

==== New Zealand ====
- Radio Sport
- TAB Trackside
- SENZ

==== Nigeria ====
88.9 Brila FM: Sports Radio 88.9 Brila FM, owned by Brila Broadcasting Services, is Nigeria's first sports radio station and was launched in 2002.

==== Norway ====
- NRK Sport - national, via DAB+ digital radio

==== Philippines ====
DZSR Sports Radio 918 kHz is the first and only sports radio station owned by the Philippine Broadcasting Service.

==== Spain ====
- Radio Marca

==== Turkey ====
- a Spor Radyo
- HT Spor Radyo
- Lig Radyo
- Radyospor
- Radyo Gol

==== United States ====
In 2009, Detroit's "97.1 The Ticket" WXYT-FM, thanks to the surprising time slot dominance of shows like Valenti and Foster, in addition to holding the play-by-play rights for the Detroit Tigers, Detroit Red Wings, Detroit Lions and the Detroit Pistons, became the United States' only sports talk radio station to be the highest rated station in their market, according to Portable People Meter rankings. The station relocated to the FM dial in October 2007 after existing on the AM dial for seven years prior, replacing a Free FM "hot talk" station, WKRK. This ratings success has led to WXYT-FM billing itself as the country's best sports station.

WXYT-FM's recent influence has led to CBS Radio installing sports radio stations on the FM dial in Dallas (105.3 The Fan), Boston (98.5 The Sports Hub), Pittsburgh (93.7 The Fan), Washington, DC (106.7 The Fan), Baltimore (105.7 The Fan) and Cleveland (92.3 The Fan), in addition to simulcasting Philadelphia's heritage 610 WIP onto the former WYSP. Other non-CBS stations have also migrated to the FM dial, most notably Clear Channel's KFAN in Minneapolis, Greater Media's WPEN in Pennsylvania and Dispatch Media's WBNS-FM in Columbus, just to name a few.

===== K =====
Call sign	Branding	Affiliation	Ownership	City	State
• KABQ	Fox Sports 1350	Fox Sports Radio	iHeartMedia	Albuquerque	New Mexico
• KAKK	Fox Sports 1570/93.7	Fox Sports Radio	De La Hunt Broadcasting	Walker	Minnesota
• KARN	The Sports Animal 920	Infinity Sports Network	Cumulus Media	Little Rock	Arkansas
• KBCN-FM	ESPN Arkansas	ESPN Radio	Pearson Broadcasting of Marshall, Inc.	Marshall	Arkansas
• KBFP	Fox Sports 970/800	Fox Sports Radio	iHeartMedia	Bakersfield	California
• KBGG	101.3 FM & 1700 AM The Champ	Infinity Sports Network	Cumulus Media	Des Moines	Iowa
• KBMB	TUDN Radio Phoenix 710	TUDN Radio	Entravision Communications	Black Canyon City	Arizona
• KBME	Sportstalk 790	Fox Sports Radio	iHeartMedia	Houston	Texas
• KBOB	ESPN 1170 AM	ESPN Radio	Townsquare Media	Davenport	Iowa
• KBTA	Sports Radio 1340	Infinity Sports Network	White River Now	Batesville	Arkansas
• KBZO	TUDN Radio Lubbock 1460	TUDN Radio	Entravision Communications	Lubbock	Texas
• KCBF	820 Sports	ESPN Radio	Last Frontier Mediactive	Fairbanks	Alaska
• KCQL	Fox Sports 1340	Fox Sports Radio	iHeartMedia	Aztec	New Mexico
• KCSF	Xtra Sports Radio 1300	Infinity Sports Network	Cumulus Media	Colorado Springs	Colorado
• KCSP	The Fan AM 610	Fox Sports Radio	Audacy, Inc.	Kansas City	Missouri
• KDKA-FM	SportsRadio 93.7 The Fan	Infinity Sports Network	Audacy, Inc.	Pittsburgh	Pennsylvania
• KDKT	KDKT Sports Radio 1410	Infinity Sports Network	Digital Syndicate Network, LLC	Bismarck	North Dakota
• KDXU-FM	Fox Sports Utah	Fox Sports Radio	Townsquare Media	Colorado City	Arizona
• KEJO	1240 Joe Radio	Fox Sports Radio	iHeartMedia	Corvallis	Oregon
• KFBC	KFBC AM 1240	Infinity Sports Network	Montgomery Broadcasting LLC	Cheyenne	Wyoming
• KFLC	TUDN Radio Dallas 1270	TUDN Radio	Latino Media Network	Benbrook	Texas
• KFH	Sports Radio 1240 & 97.5 KFH	Infinity Sports Network	Audacy, Inc.	Wichita	Kansas
• KFNC	ESPN Houston 97.5	ESPN Radio	Gow Communications, LLC	Houston	Texas
• KFNS	590 The Fan	Fox Sports Radio	Markel Radio Group, LLC	Wood River	Illinois
• KFXN-FM	100.3 FM KFAN: The Fan	Fox Sports Radio	iHeartMedia	Minneapolis-St. Paul	Minnesota
• KGA	Fox Sports 103.5/1510 The Game	Fox Sports Radio	Stephens Media Group	Spokane	Washington
• KGB	San Diego Sports 760	Fox Sports Radio	iHeartMedia	San Diego	California
• KGIR	ESPN Radio 1220	ESPN Radio	MRR LICENSE LLC	Cape Girardeau	Missouri
• KGME	Fox Sports 910	Fox Sports Radio	iHeartMedia	Phoenix	Arizona
• KGMZ-FM	95.7 The Game	Fox Sports Radio	Audacy, Inc.	San Francisco	California
• KGRZ	Sports Talk 1450	Fox Sports Radio	Cherry Creek Radio	Missoula	Montana
• KGSO	Sports Radio 93.9 FM & 1410 AM KGSO	Fox Sports Radio	Steckline Communications Inc.	Wichita	Kansas
• KGYM	1600 The Gym, 106.3 South Gym; 107.5 North Gym	ESPN Radio	KZIA, Inc.	Cedar Rapids/Iowa City	Iowa
• KHAR	CBS Sports 590 & 96.7 FM	Infinity Sports Network	Alpha Media	Anchorage	Alaska
• KHKA	CBS 1500	Infinity Sports Network	Blow Up, LLC	Honolulu	Hawaii
• KHTK	Sactown Sports 1140	Infinity Sports Network	Bonneville International	Sacramento	California
• KHTY	Fox Sports 970/800	Fox Sports Radio	iHeartMedia	Bakersfield	California
• KIFM	ESPN 1320	ESPN Radio	Audacy, Inc.	Sacramento-Yuba City	California
• KIKR	Sports Radio 1450	Infinity Sports Network	Cumulus Media	Beaumont	Texas
• KILT	Sports Radio 610	Infinity Sports Network	Audacy, Inc.	Houston	Texas
• KIRO	Seattle Sports 710	ESPN Radio	Bonneville International	Seattle	Washington
• KJR	Sports Radio 950 KJR	Fox Sports Radio	iHeartMedia	Seattle	Washington
• KJR-FM	Sports Radio 93.3 KJR	Fox Sports Radio	iHeartMedia	Seattle	Washington
• KKFN	Sportsradio 104.3 The Fan	ESPN Radio	Bonneville International	Longmont	Colorado
• KKOR	ESPN 106.3	ESPN Radio	Ohana Media Group	Astoria	Oregon
• KKSE-FM	Altitude Sports 92.5 FM	Fox Sports Radio	KSE Radio Ventures, LLC	Broomfield	Colorado
• KLAA	Angels Radio AM 830	Los Angeles Angels and ESPN Radio	Los Angeles Angels	Anaheim	California
• KLAC	AM 570 LA Sports	Fox Sports Radio	iHeartMedia	Los Angeles	California
• KLAT	TUDN Radio Houston 1010 y 93.3	TUDN Radio	Latino Media Network	Houston	Texas
• KLRZ	ESPN 100.3	ESPN Radio	Coastal Broadcasting of Larose	Larose	Louisiana
• KLWB-FM	103.7 The Game	ESPN Radio	Delta Media Corporation	Carencro	Louisiana
• KMSR	Sports Radio 1520	Fox Sports Radio	KMSR, Inc.	Grand Forks and Fargo	North Dakota
• KMTT	910 ESPN Portland	ESPN Radio	Audacy, Inc.	Vancouver	Washington
• KMXA	TUDN Radio Denver 1090	TUDN Radio	Entravision Communications	Aurora	Colorado
• KNBR	KNBR 680 & 104.5	Infinity Sports Network	Cumulus Media	San Francisco	California
• KNBR-FM	KNBR 680 & 104.5	Infinity Sports Network	Cumulus Media	San Francisco	California
• KNFL	The Fan 740/107.3	ESPN Radio	Midwest Communications	Fargo	North Dakota
• KNML	610 AM: The Sports Animal	Infinity Sports Network	Cumulus Media	Albuquerque	New Mexico
• KOZN	1620 The Zone	Fox Sports Radio	NRG Media	Omaha	Nebraska
• KPEL	103.3 The Goat	Fox Sports Radio	Townsquare Media	Lafayette	Louisiana
• KPLY	Fox Sports 630	Fox Sports Radio	Lotus Communications	Reno	Nevada
• KPWK	Fox Sports Radio 1350	Fox Sports Radio	iHeartMedia, Inc.	San Bernardino	California
• KQBU-FM	TUDN Radio Houston 1010 y 93.3	TUDN Radio	Uforia Audio Network	Port Arthur	Texas
• KQSM-FM	92.1 The Ticket	Infinity Sports Network	Cumulus Media	Fayetteville	Arkansas
• KQTM	ESPN Sports Radio 101-7 The Team	ESPN Radio	Team Broadcasting	Rio Rancho	New Mexico
• KRCO	92.5 The Ticket	Fox Sports Radio	Horizon Broadcasting Group	Bend	Oregon
• KRLD-FM	105.3 The Fan	Infinity Sports Network	Audacy, Inc.	Dallas	Texas
• KRSK	105.1 The Fan	ESPN Radio	Audacy, Inc.	Portland	Oregon
• KRSK-FM	105.1 The Fan	ESPN Radio	Audacy, Inc.	Molalla	Oregon
• KRZY	TUDN Radio Albuquerque 1450	TUDN Radio	Entravision Communications	Albuquerque	New Mexico
• KSOO	ESPN 102.3 FM & AM 1000	ESPN Radio	Townsquare Media	Sioux Falls	South Dakota
• KSPN	ESPN LA 710	ESPN Radio	Good Karma Brands	Los Angeles	California
• KSPZ	The Sports Zone 980	Fox Sports Radio	Sandhill Media Group, LLC	Idaho Falls	Idaho
• KSTP	SKOR North	ESPN Radio	Hubbard Broadcasting	Minneapolis-St. Paul	Minnesota
• KSVE	TUDN Radio El Paso 1650	TUDN Radio	Entravision Communications	El Paso	Texas
• KTAR	ESPN Phoenix 620	ESPN Radio	Bonneville International	Phoenix	Arizona
• KTCK	SportsRadio 1310 & 96.7 The Ticket	Fox Sports Radio	Cumulus Media	Dallas	Texas
• KTCK-FM	Sportsradio 1310 & 96.7 The Ticket	Fox Sports Radio	Cumulus Media	Flower Mound	Texas
• KTCT	KNBR 105	ESPN Radio	Cumulus Media	San Mateo	California
• KTFM	94.1 San Antonio's Sports Star	ESPN Radio	Alpha Media	Floresville	Texas
• KTMZ	Tu Liga Radio 1220	TUDN Radio	Lotus Communications	Pomona	California
• KTKR	Ticket 760	Fox Sports Radio	iHeartMedia	San Antonio	Texas
• KTOP	Sportsradio 1490 KTOP	Infinity Sports Network	Cumulus Media	Topeka	Kansas
• KTOQ	ESPN Rapid City	ESPN Radio	Haugo Broadcasting, Inc.	Rapid City	South Dakota
• KTTG	ESPN Sportsradio 96.3	ESPN Radio	Pearson Broadcasting	Mena	Arkansas
• KTTU	100.7 The Score	ESPN Radio	Ramar Communications	Lubbock	Texas
• KTTU-FM	Double T 97.3	Fox Sports Radio	Ramar Communications	Lubbock	Texas
• KTZN	Fox Sports 550 The Zone	Fox Sports Radio	iHeartMedia	Anchorage	Alaska
• KUJZ	Sportsradio 95.3	Infinity Sports Network	Cumulus Media	Eugene	Oregon
• KVET	AM 1300 The Zone	Fox Sports Radio	iHeartMedia	Austin	Texas
• KVSF	ESPN Santa Fe 1400	ESPN Radio	Hutton Broadcasting, LLC	Santa Fe	New Mexico
• KVWE	Panhandle Sports Star	ESPN Radio	Alpha Media	Amarillo	Texas
• KWKW	Tu Liga Radio 1330	TUDN Radio	Lotus Communications Corp.	Los Angeles	California
• KWSN	Sports Radio 1230 & 98.1 KWSN	Fox Sports Radio	Midwest Communications	Sioux Falls	South Dakota
• KXSP	AM 590 ESPN Radio	ESPN Radio	SummitMedia	Omaha	Nebraska
• KXTG	750 The Game	Infinity Sports Network	Alpha Media	Portland	Oregon
• KXNO	1460 KXNO	Fox Sports Radio	iHeartMedia	Des Moines	Iowa
• KYRX	Fox Sports 97.3	Fox Sports Radio	Withers Broadcasting	Marble Hill	Missouri
• KYWW	TUDN Radio McAllen 1530	TUDN Radio	Latino Media Network	Harlingen	Texas
• KZDC	ESPN 1250	ESPN Radio	Alpha Media	San Antonio	Texas
• KZNS	1280 The Zone	Fox Sports Radio	Larry H. Miller Communications Corporation	Salt Lake City	Utah

===== W =====
Call sign	Branding	Affiliation	Ownership	City	State
• WADO	WADO 1280	TUDN Radio	Latino Media Network	New York City	New York
• WARF	Fox Sports 1350 The Gambler	Fox Sports Radio	iHeartMedia	Akron-Cleveland	Ohio
• WAVZ	Fox Sports 1300	Fox Sports Radio	iHeartMedia	New Haven	Connecticut
• WBBD	Fox Sports 1400	Fox Sports Radio	iHeartMedia	Wheeling	West Virginia
• WBBW	Sportsradio 1240	Infinity Sports Network	Cumulus Media	Youngstown	Ohio
• WBES	95 The Sports Fox	Fox Sports Radio	Bristol Broadcasting Company	Charleston	West Virginia
• WBGG	Fox Sports 970 & 104.7 HD2	Fox Sports Radio	iHeartMedia	Pittsburgh	Pennsylvania
• WBNS	1460 ESPN Columbus	ESPN Radio	Tegna Inc.	Columbus	Ohio
• WBNS-FM	97.1 The Fan	ESPN Radio	Tegna Inc.	Columbus	Ohio
• WBZ-FM	98.5 The Sports Hub	Fox Sports Radio	Beasley Media Group	Boston	Massachusetts
• WCCP-FM	105.5 The Roar	Infinity Sports Network	Byrne Acquisition Group, LLC	Clemson	South Carolina
• WCKY	ESPN 1530	ESPN Radio	iHeartMedia	Cincinnati	Ohio
• WCMC-FM	99.9 The Fan	ESPN Radio	Capitol Broadcasting Company	Holly Springs	North Carolina
• WCNN	680 The Fan	ESPN Radio	Dickey Broadcasting Company	North Atlanta	Georgia
• WCTC	Fox Sports New Jersey 93.5 FM/1450 AM	Fox Sports Radio	Beasley Broadcast Group	New Brunswick	New Jersey
• WCWA	Fox Sports 1230 The Gambler	Fox Sports Radio	iHeartMedia	Toledo	Ohio
• WDAE	95.3 WDAE & AM 620	ESPN Radio	iHeartMedia	Tampa	Florida
• WDNC	620/1550 the Buzz	ESPN Radio	Capitol Broadcasting Company	Durham	North Carolina
• WDSM	710 The Game	Infinity Sports Network	Midwest Communications	Superior	Wisconsin
• WDUZ	Sports Radio 107.5 and 1400 The Fan	Infinity Sports Network	Cumulus Media	Green Bay	Wisconsin
• WEEI-FM	SportsRadio 93.7 WEEI	WEEI-FM/Infinity Sports Network	Audacy, Inc.	Boston	Massachusetts
• WEEX	Fox Sports Lehigh Valley	Fox Sports Radio	Cumulus Media	Easton	Pennsylvania
• WEEY	WEEI Sports Radio Network	WEEI-FM	Great Eastern Radio, LLC	Swanzey	New Hampshire
• WEFL	Deportes Radio 760	TUDN Radio; Unanimo Deportes Radio	Good Karma Broadcasting	Tequesta	Florida
• WEII	Sportsradio 96.3 WEEI	WEEI-FM/ESPN Radio	iHeartMedia	Dennis	Massachusetts
• WEMB	1420 WEMB Sports Radio	Fox Sports Radio	Jet Broadcasting, Inc.	Erwin	Tennessee
• WENJ	97.3 ESPN	ESPN Radio	Townsquare Media	Millville	New Jersey
• WEPN	1050 AM ESPN	ESPN Radio	Good Karma Brands	New York City	New York
• WESP	ESPN 106.3	ESPN Radio	Good Karma Brands	Jupiter	Florida
• WEZQ	92.9 The Ticket	ESPN Radio	Townsquare Media	Bangor	Maine
• WFAN	Sports Radio 66 and 101.9 FM WFAN: The Fan	Infinity Sports Network	Audacy, Inc.	New York City	New York
• WFAN-FM	Sports Radio 66 and 101.9 FM WFAN: The Fan	Infinity Sports Network	Audacy, Inc.	New York City	New York
• WFNZ-FM	Sportsradio 92.7 WFNZ	Infinity Sports Network	Urban One	Charlotte	North Carolina
• WFXN	Fox Sports 1230	Fox Sports Radio	iHeartMedia	Moline	Illinois
• WGFX	104.5 The Zone	Fox Sports Radio	Cumulus Media	Nashville	Tennessee
• WGKY	Fox Sports 95.9	Fox Sports Radio	Withers Broadcasting	Wickliffe	Kentucky
• WGR	WGR Sports Radio 550	ESPN Radio	Audacy, Inc.	Buffalo	New York
• WHB	Sports Radio 810 WHB	ESPN Radio	Union Broadcasting	Kansas City	Missouri
• WHBQ	Sports 56	Fox Sports Radio	Flinn Broadcasting Corporation	Memphis	Tennessee
• WHSQ	ESPN New York 880	ESPN Radio	Audacy, Inc.	New York City	New York
• WING	1410 ESPN Radio	ESPN Radio	Alpha Media	Dayton	Ohio
* WIOU	1350 AM WIOU	ESPN Radio	Hoosier AM/FM LLC	Kokomo	Indiana
• WIP-FM	Sports Radio 94 WIP	Infinity Sports Network	Audacy, Inc.	Philadelphia	Pennsylvania
• WJOX	Jox 3	Fox Sports Radio	Cumulus Media	Birmingham	Alabama
• WJOX-FM	Jox 94.5	Infinity Sports Network	Cumulus Media	Birmingham	Alabama
• WJQX	Jox 2	ESPN Radio	Cumulus Media	Helena	Alabama
• WJFK-FM	106.7 The Fan	Infinity Sports Network	Audacy, Inc.	Manassas	Virginia
• WJXL	1010 XL 92.5 FM	VSiN	Seven Bridges Radio, LLC	Jacksonville Beach	Florida
• WJXL-FM	1010 XL 92.5 FM	Infinity Sports Network	River City Broadcasting, LLC	Jacksonville Beach	Florida
• WJZ-FM	105.7 The Fan	Infinity Sports Network	Audacy, Inc.	Catonsville	Maryland
• WKRD	Cards Radio 790	Fox Sports Radio	iHeartMedia	Louisville	Kentucky
• WKRS	TUDN Radio WKRS 1220	TUDN Radio	Alpha Media	Waukegan	Illinois
• WKNR	ESPN 850 WKNR; ESPN Cleveland	ESPN Radio	Good Karma Brands	Cleveland	Ohio
• WKRK-FM	92.3 The Fan	Infinity Sports Network	Audacy, Inc.	Cleveland Heights	Ohio
• WLLF	Sportsradio 96.7	Infinity Sports Network	Cumulus Media	Mercer	Pennsylvania
• WLOP	1370 The BUZZ	Fox Sports Radio	Jesup Broadcasting	Jesup	Georgia
• WLXG	ESPN SportsRadio 1300	ESPN Radio	L.M. Communications, Inc.	Lexington	Kentucky
• WMAX-FM	96.1 The Game	Fox Sports Radio	iHeartMedia	Grand Rapids	Michigan
• WMEN	Fox Sports 640	Fox Sports Radio	Hubbard Broadcasting	Royal Palm Beach	Florida
• WMFS	ESPN 92.9 & 680	ESPN Radio	Audacy, Inc.	Memphis	Tennessee
• WMFS-FM	ESPN 92.9 & 680	ESPN Radio	Audacy, Inc.	Memphis	Tennessee
• WMUN	Muncie's Sports Station	Fox Sports Radio	Backyard Broadcasting	Muncie	Indiana
• WMVP	ESPN Radio 1000	ESPN Radio	Good Karma Brands	Chicago	Illinois
• WNCO	Fox Sports Radio 1340	Fox Sports Radio	iHeartMedia	Ashland	Ohio
• WNDE	Sportsradio 1260	Fox Sports Radio	iHeartMedia	Indianapolis	Indiana
• WNFL	SportsRadio WNFL 1440 AM/101.9 FM	Fox Sports Radio	Midwest Communications	Green Bay	Wisconsin
• WNML	Sportsradio WNML	Infinity Sports Network	Cumulus Media	Knoxville	Tennessee
• WNML-FM	Sportsradio WNML	Infinity Sports Network	Cumulus Media	Friendsville	Tennessee
• WNSR	Sports Radio 560	Infinity Sports Network	Southern Wabash Communications of Middle Tennessee, Inc.	Nashville	Tennessee
• WNST	Sports Talk 1570 WNST	Fox Sports Radio	Nasty 1570 Sports, LLC	Towson; Baltimore	Maryland
• WOFX	Fox Sports 980 & 95.9 FM	Fox Sports Radio	iHeartMedia	Troy	New York
• WONE	Fox Sports 980	Fox Sports Radio	iHeartMedia	Dayton	Ohio
• WORD	The Fan Upstate	Infinity Sports Network	Audacy, Inc.	Spartanburg	South Carolina
• WOYK	Sports Radio 1350	Fox Sports Radio	York Professional Baseball Club, LLC	York	Pennsylvania
• WPAD	99.5 The Fan	Fox Sports Radio	Bristol Broadcasting Company	Paducah	Kentucky
• WPEN	97.5 The Fanatic	ESPN Radio	Beasley Broadcast Group	Burlington	New Jersey
• WPEI	95.5 and 95.9 WPEI	WEEI-FM/Fox Sports Radio/ESPN Radio	Atlantic Coast Radio	Saco	Maine
• WPPI	95.5 and 95.9 WPEI	WEEI-FM/Fox Sports Radio/ESPN Radio	Atlantic Coast Radio	Topsham	Maine
• WPRT-FM	102.5 The Game	ESPN Radio	Cromwell Group	Nashville	Tennessee
• WQAM	104.3 WQAM	Infinity Sports Network	Audacy, Inc.	Miami	Florida
• WQAM-FM	104.3 WQAM	Infinity Sports Network	Audacy, Inc.	Miramar	Florida
• WRAD-FM	SuperSports 101.7	Infinity Sports Network	Monticello Media	Radford	Virginia
• WRFC	SportsRadio 960 The Ref	ESPN Radio	Cox Media Group	Athens	Georgia
• WRKS	ESPN 105.9 The Zone	ESPN Radio	Alpha Media	Pickens	Mississippi
• WRNL	910 The Fan	Infinity Sports Network	Audacy, Inc.	Richmond	Virginia
• WROC	95.7 The Fan	Infinity Sports Network	Audacy, Inc.	Rochester	New York
• WRSO	Fox Sports 97.9 & 810	Fox Sports Radio	iHeartMedia	Orlando	Florida
• WRTO	TUDN Radio Chicago 1200	TUDN Radio	Latino Media Network	Chicago	Illinois
• WSAI	Fox Sports 1360	Fox Sports Radio	iHeartMedia	Cincinnati	Ohio
• WSBN	ESPN 630 DC	ESPN Radio	Cumulus Media	Washington	District of Columbia
• WSCR	104.3 The Score	Infinity Sports Network	Audacy, Inc.	Chicago	Illinois
• WSCR-FM	104.3 The Score	Infinity Sports Network	Audacy, Inc.	Chicago	Illinois
• WSEA	Sports Radio 100.3 "The Team" Myrtle Beach	Infinity Sports Network	Cumulus Media	Atlantic Beach	South Carolina
• WSEG	ESPN Radio FM 104.3	ESPN Radio	Southern Media Interactive LLC	Savannah	Georgia
• WSJK	ESPN 93.5	ESPN Radio	Stevie Jay Broadcasting	Champaign/Urbana	Illinois
• WSWW	ESPN 1490	ESPN Radio	West Virginia Radio Corporation	Charleston	West Virginia
• WSYB	Fox Sports 1380	Fox Sports Radio	Pamal Broadcasting	Rutland	Vermont
• WTEM	The Team 980	Fox Sports Radio	Audacy, Inc.	Washington	District of Columbia
• WTKA	Sports Talk 1050 WTKA	Infinity Sports Network	Cumulus Media	Ann Arbor	Michigan
• WTLX	FM 100.5 ESPN	ESPN Radio	Good Karma Brands	Madison	Wisconsin
• WTMM-FM	104.5 The Team	ESPN Radio	Townsquare Media	Albany	New York
• WTSV	94 WEEI	WEEI-FM/ESPN Radio	Great Eastern Radio, LLC	Claremont	New Hampshire
• WUCS	Fox Sports 97.9	Fox Sports Radio	iHeartMedia	Hartford	Connecticut
• WUMP	SportsRadio 730 The UMP	Infinity Sports Network	Cumulus Media	Huntsville	Alabama
• WVEI	SportsRadio 1440 WEEI	WEEI (AM)/ESPN Radio	Audacy, Inc.	Worcester	Massachusetts
• WVEI-FM	SportsRadio 103.7 WEEI-FM	WEEI/ESPN Radio	Audacy, Inc.	Providence	Rhode Island
• WVSP-FM	Priority Audio Sports Radio 94.1	ESPN Radio	Max Broadcast Group Holdings, Inc.	Yorktown	Virginia
• WWBA	Sports Talk Florida	Infinity Sports Network	Genesis Communications	Largo	Florida
• WWEI	SportsRadio 105.5 WEEI-FM	WEEI/ESPN Radio	Audacy, Inc.	Springfield	Massachusetts
• WWSR	93.1 The Fan	ESPN Radio	Wolf Boom Radio	Lima	Ohio
• WWTX	Fox Sports 1290	Fox Sports Radio	iHeartMedia	Wilmington	Delaware
• WXOS	ESPN 101.1	ESPN Radio	Hubbard Broadcasting	East St. Louis	Illinois
• WXYT-FM	97.1 The Ticket	Infinity Sports Network	Audacy, Inc.	Detroit	Michigan
• WYGM	FM 96.9 The Game	Fox Sports Radio	iHeartMedia	Orlando	Florida
• WYRD	The Fan Upstate	Infinity Sports Network	Audacy, Inc.	Greenville	South Carolina
• WYTK	93.9 THE SCORE	ESPN Radio	Valley Broadcasting	Rogersville	Alabama
• WZGC	92-9 The Game	Infinity Sports Network	Audacy, Inc.	Atlanta	Georgia
• WZWB	Fox Sports 1420	Fox Sports Radio	iHeartMedia	Kenova	West Virginia
• WZZN	97.7 ESPN The Zone	ESPN Radio	Neighbors Broadcast Company	Huntsville	Alabama

==== Uruguay ====
- Carve Deportiva
- Sport 890

=== Satellite ===
==== Sirius XM ====
- Sirius XM 80 - ESPN Radio
- Sirius XM 81 - ESPN Xtra
- Sirius XM 82 - Mad Dog Sports Radio
- Sirius XM 83 - Fox Sports Radio
- Sirius XM 84 - ESPNU Radio
- Sirius XM 86 - Sirius XM NBA Radio
- Sirius XM 87 - Sirius XM Fantasy Sports Radio
- Sirius XM 88 - Sirius XM NFL Radio
- Sirius XM 89 - MLB Network Radio
- Sirius XM 90 - Sirius XM NASCAR Radio
- Sirius XM 91 - Sirius XM NHL Network Radio
- Sirius XM 92 - Sirius XM PGA Tour Radio
- Sirius XM 156 - Pro Wrestling Nation 24/7
- Sirius XM 157 - Sirius XM FC
- Sirius XM 206 - Infinity Sports Network
- Sirius XM 211 - Dan Patrick Radio
- Sirius XM 371 - Sirius XM ACC Radio
- Sirius XM 372 - Sirius XM Big Ten Radio
- Sirius XM 373 - Sirius XM Pac-12 Radio
- Sirius XM 374 - Sirius XM SEC Radio
- Sirius XM 375 - Sirius XM Big 12 Radio

=== Internet sports radio ===
- RIVAL Radio 809 - sports programming all day long, with a little something special at night.
- Sports Radio America - home to the next generation of independent sports radio talk show producers from around America.
- Victory Lane Radio - racing on Monday nights and Football Frenzy on Wednesday nights.
- National Sports Network - The only independent sports play-by-play radio network airing NCAA College Basketball games.

== Networks ==
=== Canada ===
- Sportsnet Radio
- TSN Radio

=== United Kingdom ===
- BBC Radio 5 Live - national public service broadcasting non-commercial network; combination of news/talk/sport format
- BBC Radio 5 Sports Extra - supplementary station to the above; exclusive live sports format
- Talksport - national commercial network; features sports talk and live sports coverage
- Talksport 2 - supplementary station to the above; exclusive live sports format

=== United States ===
- ESPN Radio
- Fox Sports Radio
- Fútbol de Primera
- Westwood One Sports
- Motor Racing Network
- Performance Racing Network
- Sports Byline USA
- TUDN Radio

== Defunct networks ==
- Champions Soccer Radio Network (United States)
- Enterprise Radio Network (United States)
- KRAE (Cheyenne's ESPN sports radio) (USA, Wyoming) - contract ended 2013, now oldies radio
- NBC Sports Radio
- Réseau Sport Radio Network via Digital Radio Oceane (New Caledonia/Wallis & Futuna)
- Sports Fan Radio Network (United States)
- ESPN Deportes Radio (United States)
- The Team (Canada)
- Bradesco Esportes FM (Brazil)
- Macquarie Sports Radio - National, via DAB+ Perth, Sydney 954, Melbourne 1278 & Brisbane 882
- SportsMap
- NTV Spor Radyo (Turkey)

== Notable syndicated programs ==
=== Canada ===
- Don Cherry's Grapeline
- Prime Time Sports

=== United States ===
- 2 Live Stews
- The Ben Maller Show
- Boomer and Gio
- The Dan Le Batard Show with Stugotz
- The Dan Patrick Show
- The Doug Gottlieb Show
- The Herd with Colin Cowherd
- J. T. the Brick
- The Jim Rome Show
- The Michael Kay Show
- Mike and Mike in the Morning
- Mike and the Mad Dog
- Mike's On
- The Ryen Russillo Show
- The Tony Kornheiser Show
- The Toucher and Rich Show

== See also ==
- Broadcasting of sports events
- Radio personality
- Major League Baseball on the radio
- College football on radio
- National Football League on the radio
