= WBCI =

- Bath, Maine; United States
- Broadcast area: Portland; Lewiston–Auburn; Augusta-Waterville
- Frequency: 105.9 MHz
- Branding: WBCI 105.9 FM

Programming
- Format: Religious
- Affiliations: Salem Radio Network

Ownership
- Owner: Blount Communications; (Blount Communications, Inc. of Maine)
- Sister stations: WDER

History
- First air date: June 1971
- Former call signs: WJTO-FM (1971–1976); WIGY (1976–1991); WKRH (1991–1995)
- Former frequencies: 95.3 MHz (1971–1976)
- Call sign meaning: Blount Communications, Inc.

Technical information
- Licensing authority: FCC
- Facility ID: 33288
- Class: B
- ERP: 50,000 watts
- HAAT: 152 meters (499 ft)
- Transmitter coordinates: 44°4′9.2″N 69°55′26.1″W

Links
- Public license information: Public file; LMS
- Webcast: Listen live
- Website: Official website

WBCI (105.9 FM) is a radio station licensed to Bath, Maine, United States. The station serves the Portland, Lewiston–Auburn, and Augusta-Waterville areas. The station is owned by Blount Communications.

== History ==
Originally on 95.3 MHz, WJTO-FM began in June 1971. WJTO-FM was co-owned with WJTO (730 AM). WJTO-FM later became WIGY with a contemporary hit radio format. Later the station changed formats and calls to classic rock WKRH on January 10, 1991. WKRH eventually went silent and was purchased by Blount Communications; on May 1, 1995, the station changed its call sign to the current WBCI.
