= WARX =

Coordinates: 44.145°N 70.022°W

- Lewiston, Maine; United States
- Broadcast area: Lewiston-Auburn–Augusta–Portland, Maine
- Frequency: 93.9 MHz
- Branding: Air1

Programming
- Format: Contemporary worship music
- Affiliations: Air1

Ownership
- Owner: Educational Media Foundation

History
- First air date: February 29, 1948
- Former call signs: WCOU-FM (1948–1979); WAYU (1979–1988); WXGL-FM (1988–1994); WCYI (1994–2008)
- Call sign meaning: Air1

Technical information
- Licensing authority: FCC
- Facility ID: 26389
- Class: B
- ERP: 27,500 watts
- HAAT: 193 meters (633 ft)

Links
- Public license information: Public file; LMS
- Webcast: Listen live
- Website: www.air1.com

WARX (93.9 FM) is a non-commercial radio station in Lewiston, Maine that features worship music programming from Air1. It is under ownership of the Educational Media Foundation.

The station dates back to WCOU-FM, the first FM station in Lewiston-Auburn. Following WCOU, the station has had several previous on-air slogans including WAYU as country and WXGL Eagle 94 as an oldies formatted station.

Following acquisition by Fuller-Jeffrey Broadcasting in 1994, the station simulcasted WCYY for over 10 years until the transfer to The Last Bastion Station Trust, LLC, when it switched to a simulcast of WCLZ. The station (at that time WCYI), along with co-owned WCLZ, was transferred to The Last Bastion Station Trust, LLC, due to parent company Citadel Broadcasting buying out ABC Radio. The station kept the Opie & Anthony Show . In October 2007 Saga Communications bought WCLZ, dropping the simulcast but keeping the Opie & Anthony Show, thus resulting in WCYI programming an automated Blues format in October 2007.

On February 21, 2008, it was announced that the Educational Media Foundation bought WCYI for a reported $1 million. In early March 2008 it was report that WCYI would likely become an affiliate of EMF's K-Love contemporary Christian music format. However, later the same month, it was reported that the station would carry Air 1 (sister network to K-Love) according to EMF's vice president of communications. On August 15, 2008, the station changed its call letters to WARX.
