= WPEI =

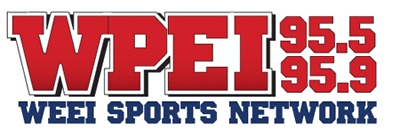
- Saco, Maine; United States
- Broadcast area: Portland, Maine
- Frequency: 95.9 MHz
- Branding: 95.5 and 95.9 WPEI

Programming
- Format: Sports
- Affiliations: WEEI Sports Radio Network; ESPN Radio; Fox Sports Radio; Boston Red Sox Radio Network; Boston Celtics Radio Network; Portland Sea Dogs Radio Network

Ownership
- Owner: Atlantic Coast Radio, LLC
- Sister stations: WJJB-FM; WLOB; WRED; WPPI

History
- First air date: July 18, 1982
- Former call signs: WPIG (1981–1984); WHYR (1984–1995); WRED (1995–2008); WRED-FM (2008)
- Call sign meaning: "Portland WEEI"

Technical information
- Licensing authority: FCC
- Facility ID: 69640
- Class: A
- ERP: 4,700 watts
- HAAT: 113 meters (371 ft)
- Transmitter coordinates: 43°32′38.1″N 70°24′14.3″W
- Repeater: 95.5 WPPI (Topsham)

Links
- Public license information: Public file; LMS
- Website: www.weei.com

WPEI (95.9 FM) is a WEEI Sports Radio Network station serving the Portland, Maine, area. The station is owned by Atlantic Coast Radio.

== History ==
On July 18, 1982, WPEI signed on as WPIG with a country format and the slogan "Southern Maine's Country: FM-96 WPIG". In 1984, it became hot adult contemporary WHYR with slogans "Your Stereo", and then "R-96". In July 1990, WHYR flipped to contemporary hit radio as "96-HYR". In 1995, WHYR changed calls to WRED, but kept the same format and was known on air as "Red Hot 95" with the slogan "Portland's Hot Hits". Some time later, WRED went rhythmic top 40 as "Red Hot 95.9" with the slogan "Maine's #1 for Blazin' Hot Hits".

On August 31, 2008, at 6 p.m., WRED dropped its rhythmic top 40 format after a farewell from station DJs (airstaff and listeners had been notified a week in advance). WRED and WJJB-FM 95.5 (which was simulcasting The Big JAB) then flipped to programming provided by Boston's WEEI, with the simulcast of The Big JAB moving to 96.3 FM.

Up until April 1, 2009, WEEI's programming was also heard on sister station WGEI (95.5 FM), and the stations were known as WEEI on the 95's. (WGEI, the former WJJB-FM, had initially planned to use the WTEI call sign, and for a week in September 2008 used the WUEI call letters.) As of April 2009, WGEI was simulcasting AM sister station WLOB, as WLOB-FM; that station eventually returned to simulcasting with WPEI in August 2011, and is now WPPI.

== Programming ==
WPEI does not carry Boston College football. It does carry Boston Celtics basketball, as well as Boston Red Sox baseball in tandem with The Big JAB. WPEI carries ESPN Radio when not airing WEEI; it had previously carried Fox Sports Radio (now on The Big JAB) and Sporting News Radio (simulcast from The Big JAB, before WZAN dropped the FSR affiliation). WPEI has been the flagship station of the Portland Sea Dogs since 2012, taking over for WBAE/WVAE that year.
