= WPPI =

Simulcast of WPEI
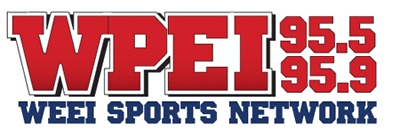
- Topsham, Maine; United States
- Broadcast area: Portland, Maine
- Frequency: 95.5 MHz
- Branding: 95.5 and 95.9 WPEI

Programming
- Format: Sports
- Affiliations: WEEI Sports Radio Network; ESPN Radio; Fox Sports Radio; Boston Red Sox Radio Network; Boston Celtics Radio Network; Portland Sea Dogs Radio Network

Ownership
- Owner: Atlantic Coast Radio
- Sister stations: WJJB-FM; WLOB; WRED; WPEI

History
- First air date: 1993 (as WPME)
- Former call signs: WLLB (1989–1993); WPME (1993–1994); WXGL-FM (1994–2000); WCLZ (2000–2001); WJJB-FM (2001–2008); WUEI (2008); WGEI (2008–2009); WLOB-FM (2009–2011)
- Call sign meaning: similar to WPEI

Technical information
- Licensing authority: FCC
- Facility ID: 12160
- Class: A
- Power: 3,000 watts
- HAAT: 139 meters (456 ft)
- Transmitter coordinates: 43°54′12″N 70°2′13″W

Links
- Public license information: Public file; LMS
- Website: www.weei.com

WPPI (95.5 FM) is a sports radio station in the Portland, Maine, area. The station is owned by Atlantic Coast Radio.

WPPI serves as a simulcast of WPEI (95.9 FM) in Saco. Both stations, in turn, mostly carry the same programs as WEEI-FM from Boston. Some local commercials take the place of Boston commercials, and some WEEI-FM game broadcasts are substituted with Fox Sports Radio. WPPI also carries Maine Black Bears football and ice hockey, and Portland Pirates ice hockey.

== History ==
The 95.5 frequency began operations in 1993 as WPME, simulcasting a country music format with 96.7 WCME from Boothbay Harbor (now WBQA). A year later, the station converted to an oldies format as WXGL-FM. Atlantic Coast Radio purchased the station in 1999, and in January 2000, the station switched to an adult album alternative format as WCLZ. A few months later, WCLZ adopted a sports talk format, initially as a simulcast of WJAE; the next year, the station took the call letters WJJB-FM.

On August 25, 2008, 96.3 WLOB-FM was converted to a simulcast of WJJB (which WJAE had become by that time), resulting in WLOB's programming being heard only on the AM signal. This was part of a shuffle of Atlantic Coast Radio's FM stations as a result of the conversion of two of its stations, including WJJB-FM, on September 1, 2008 to simulcasts of WEEI. Shortly after the completion of these format changes, 95.5's call letters were changed to WGEI (it had initially planned to use the WTEI call sign, and for a week in September 2008 used the WUEI call letters).

On April 1, 2009, WGEI converted to a simulcast of WLOB; it became WLOB-FM a few days later. In August 2011, WLOB-FM returned to simulcasting WEEI. On September 7, 2011, WLOB-FM changed its call letters to WPPI.
