= WBLM =

Classic rock radio station in Portland, Maine

- Portland, Maine; United States
- Broadcast area: Portland; Lewiston-Auburn; Augusta, Maine; North Conway, New Hampshire
- Frequency: 102.9 MHz
- Branding: 102.9 WBLM

Programming
- Format: Classic rock
- Affiliations: New England Patriots Radio Network

Ownership
- Owner: Townsquare Media; (Townsquare License, LLC)
- Sister stations: WCYY; WHOM; WJBQ; WPKQ

History
- First air date: February 7, 1967
- Former call signs: WGAN-FM (1967–1987); WTHT (1987–1989)
- Call sign meaning: "Blimp"

Technical information
- Licensing authority: FCC
- Facility ID: 22878
- Class: C0
- ERP: 100,000 watts
- HAAT: 435 meters (1,427 ft)
- Transmitter coordinates: 43.925°N 70.491°W

Links
- Public license information: Public file; LMS
- Webcast: Listen live
- Website: www.wblm.com

WBLM (102.9 FM) is a classic rock radio station licensed to Portland, Maine. The station has a studio in One City Center, along with co-owned Townsquare Media stations WJBQ, WCYY and WHOM. The station also serves as the Portland market affiliate for the New England Patriots Radio Network. Not counting WHOM (which transmits from Mount Washington in New Hampshire), it is the most powerful FM station in the Portland market, covering a large swath of western Maine and eastern New Hampshire clearly. It is one of only a few FM stations in New England licensed to operate at 100,000 watts. WBLM broadcasts from a tower near Maine State Route 121 in Raymond that is the second tallest man-made structure in Maine (second only to the tower for WMTW).

In the movie City Slickers, Billy Crystal's character claimed to have been a sales executive for the fictional station "WBLM Radio".

== History ==
WBLM signed on the air on March 1, 1973, on 107.5 MHz. By day, it played beautiful music (also known as easy listening, mostly instrumental versions of Broadway, Hollywood, and popular hits) with free-form progressive rock airing from 6 p.m. to 6 a.m. The station was licensed to Lewiston, Maine, and its antenna was located in Litchfield, Maine, also the site of the original studio, which was a double-wide mobile home. Later that year, WBLM became a full-time progressive rocker. The station signed on the air at midnight, March 1, 1973, with a Bible reading from the Book of Genesis, done by Dave Doolittle. This was followed by the first rock song the station played on the air, "Procession" by the Moody Blues from their album "Every Good Boy Deserves Favour", chosen by blind DJ, Steve Hoad.

Given that the transmitter site was some 40 miles (64 km) away from Portland, the station's signal was somewhat spotty in Portland and beyond. In 1979, it modified its format to mainstream album-oriented rock, after being challenged in the ratings by what at the time was a new 3,000-watt album rock station, 100.9 WLOB-FM, known as "FM 101" and currently WYNZ. Air personality John Clark from FM-101 defected to WBLM in late 1981. On December 6, 1989, it switched frequencies with 102.9 WTHT. The 102.9 facility was previously WGAN-FM, co-owned with WGAN (560 AM), from its sign-on on February 7, 1967, until 1987. WGAN-FM flipped from beautiful music to CHR on February 20, 1985. The 107.5 frequency is now WFNK, a direct competitor to WBLM with a classic rock/classic hits format. The two stations are often at the top of the Portland ratings list.

WBLM has a colorful connection to rock acts Frank Zappa and Captain Beefheart. WBLM's nickname is "The Rock and Roll Blimp". The station's on-the-air catchphrase is: "It's The Blimp Frank, it's The Blimp!"; both refer to the Captain Beefheart track off the album Trout Mask Replica "The Blimp", which is where the catchphrase comes from (the catchphrase is a portion of the beginning of that song). It's The Blimp "Frank" is in reference to Frank Zappa as the portion of the song used for the catchphrase is a recording of a phone call made from Beefheart's recording session back to their record label owner Frank Zappa about their new song titled "The Blimp". The "Cosmic Muffin" astrological forecast, which was a daily report on WBLM for years also used as its theme song "Muffin Man" by Frank Zappa, specifically the vocal portion proclaiming "The man thought he was a man but he was a muffin."

The logo for WBLM was chosen among many entries in a listener contest in 1973. A large blimp, hand drawn in black India ink, was the unanimous choice of the staff as the logo. It measured about 4 feet wide. The Frank Zappa connection was not part of this original concept but added later.

On August 30, 2013, a deal was announced in which Townsquare Media would acquire 53 stations from Cumulus Media, including WBLM, for $238 million. The deal was part of Cumulus' acquisition of Dial Global; Townsquare and Dial Global were both controlled by Oaktree Capital Management. The sale to Townsquare was completed on November 14, 2013.
