= WBYA =

- Islesboro, Maine; United States
- Broadcast area: Mid Coast
- Frequency: 105.5 MHz
- Branding: 105.5 The Wave

Programming
- Format: Soft adult contemporary

Ownership
- Owner: Binnie Media; (WBIN Media Co., Inc.)
- Sister stations: WBQX

History
- First air date: February 1999
- Former call signs: WAYD (1999–2001)
- Call sign meaning: "Bay" (former branding)

Technical information
- Licensing authority: FCC
- Facility ID: 41105
- Class: B1
- ERP: 25,000 watts
- HAAT: 93 meters (305 ft)
- Transmitter coordinates: 44°18′58.3″N 68°58′10.1″W

Links
- Public license information: Public file; LMS
- Webcast: Listen live
- Website: 1055thewave.com

WBYA (105.5 FM; "The Wave") is a radio station licensed to Islesboro, Maine, United States. The station serves the Mid Coast area with a soft adult contemporary format. The station is owned by Binnie Media, and broadcasts from a transmitter on U.S. 1 south of Northport.

== History ==
The station went on the air as WAYD in February 1999, programming an adult standards format branded as "The Bay". It was owned by Gopher Hill Communications, who also owned WQSS in Camden and WABI and WWBX in Bangor; the station was based out of the WQSS studios in Camden. On April 16, 2001, the station changed its call sign to the current WBYA, which had just been dropped by WFZX in Searsport. Gopher Hill sold WBYA to Mariner Broadcasting in 2003; this came after the other three Gopher Hill stations were sold to Clear Channel Communications. Mariner kept the standards format, but dropped locally-produced programming in favor of the Music of Your Life service.

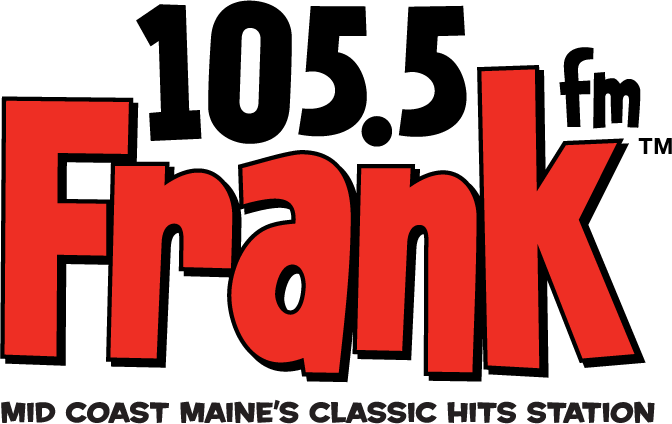
WBYA's logo as "105.5 Frank FM", used from April 2005 through February 2017

WBYA's logo as "105.5 The Wolf", used from February 2017 until June 2025

Nassau Broadcasting Partners acquired Mariner in 2004; under Nassau, the station switched to the "Frank FM" classic hits format on April 1, 2005. WBYA simulcast the morning show of Portland sister WFNK, and in addition to the classic hits format broadcast local high school basketball games and Boston Red Sox baseball.

WBYA, along with 16 other Nassau stations in northern New England, was purchased at bankruptcy auction by WBIN Media Company, a company controlled by Bill Binnie, on May 22, 2012. Binnie already owned WBIN-TV in Derry, New Hampshire. The deal was completed on November 30, 2012.

On February 18, 2017, Binnie Media moved the classic hits format to WBQX (106.9 FM), replacing the classical music programming of WBACH; WBYA then began stunting with a loop directing listeners to WBQX. On February 24, 2017, WBYA changed to a country music format, branded as "105.5 The Wolf"; the new format includes a simulcast of Portland sister station WTHT's morning show. Following the format changes, WBYA retained Boston Red Sox broadcasts, while its high school basketball coverage was transferred to WBQX.

On June 24, 2025, it was announced that WBYA will drop both its Wolf branding and country format and flip to a soft adult contemporary format under the branding "105.5 The Wave" on June 30, 2025.
