= WHXR =

- Scarborough, Maine; United States
- Broadcast area: Portland, Maine
- Frequency: 106.3 MHz
- Branding: 106.3 The Bone

Programming
- Language: English
- Format: Active rock
- Affiliations: Compass Media Networks

Ownership
- Owner: Binnie Media; (WBIN Media Co., Inc.)
- Sister stations: WBQQ; WFNK; WTHT

History
- First air date: 1974
- Former call signs: WJBQ-FM (1974–1981); WDCS (1981–1988); WPKM (1988–1998); WBQW (1998–2008); WHXQ (2008–2010)

Technical information
- Licensing authority: FCC
- Facility ID: 73885
- Class: A
- ERP: 3,000 watts
- HAAT: 91 meters
- Transmitter coordinates: 43°35′22.3″N 70°22′19.2″W

Links
- Public license information: Public file; LMS
- Webcast: Listen live
- Website: 1063thebone.com

WHXR (106.3 FM; "The Bone") is an active rock radio station licensed to serve Scarborough, Maine, with studios in Portland. Established in 1974, the station is owned by Binnie Media.

== History ==
WHXR signed on the air in 1974 as top 40 station WJBQ-FM, simulcasting with WJBQ (1440 AM). In 1981, the station swapped formats and call signs with 97.9 FM, becoming classical music station WDCS. It became WPKM in 1988, and in 1998 joined the WBACH network as WBQW. On October 2, 2008, the station switched call signs and programming with 104.7 (which operated with the WBACH classical music programming as WBQW until 2012, when it became top 40 station WHTP).

On April 13, 2004, WHXQ originally began broadcasting on 104.7 as a classic rock station branded as "The Bone", shifting to active rock in 2006 and moving to 106.3 on October 2, 2008. Prior to April 9, 2010, WHXQ was simulcast on WHXR (106.7 FM); on August 3, 2010, WHXQ took the WHXR call letters abandoned by 106.7, which had become WXTP.

WHXR, along with 16 other stations in northern New England formerly owned by Nassau Broadcasting Partners, was purchased at bankruptcy auction by WBIN Media Company, a company controlled by Bill Binnie, on May 22, 2012. Binnie already owned WBIN-TV in Derry, New Hampshire. The deal was completed on November 30, 2012; on that day, WHXR rebranded from "106.3 The Bone" to "Rock 106.3". On August 30, 2019, WHXR returned to the "106.3 The Bone" branding.
