= WTHT =

Country music radio station in Auburn, Maine

- Auburn, Maine; United States
- Broadcast area: Portland, Maine; Lewiston–Auburn
- Frequency: 99.9 MHz (HD Radio)
- Branding: 99.9 the Wolf

Programming
- Format: Country

Ownership
- Owner: Binnie Media; (WBIN Media Co., Inc.)
- Sister stations: WFNK; WHXR

History
- First air date: February 1977
- Former call signs: WWAV (1977–1983); WKZS (1983–1998); WMWX (1998–2000); WMEK-FM (2000–2004)

Technical information
- Licensing authority: FCC
- Facility ID: 24949
- Class: B
- ERP: 28,500 watts
- HAAT: 196 meters (643 ft)
- Transmitter coordinates: 43°57′7.3″N 70°17′44.2″W
- Translator: WTHT: 96.9 W245AA (Portland)

Links
- Public license information: Public file; LMS
- Webcast: Listen live
- Website: 999thewolf.com

Former simulcast
- WBQQ
- Kennebunk, Maine; United States
- Broadcast area: York County, Maine
- Frequency: 99.3 MHz
- Branding: 99.3 The Wave

Programming
- Format: Soft oldies

Ownership
- Owner: Binnie Media; (WBIN Media Co., Inc.)

History
- First air date: November 1991
- Call sign meaning: Bach (station formerly carried WBACH)

Technical information
- Facility ID: 69854
- Class: A
- ERP: 3,000 watts
- HAAT: 100 meters (330 ft)
- Transmitter coordinates: 43°24′16.3″N 70°26′13.1″W

Links
- Public license information: Public file; LMS
- Website: 993thewavemaine.com

WTHT (99.9 FM; "The Wolf") is a radio station broadcasting a country music format. Licensed to Auburn, Maine, the station serves Greater Portland. It is owned by Binnie Media, with studios on Thomas Drive in Westbrook. Programming was simulcast on WBQQ (99.3 FM) in Kennebunk from 2012 until 2024, when WBQQ launched a York County–oriented soft oldies format.

WTHT is a Class B station. It has an effective radiated power (ERP) of 28,500 watts. The transmitter is roughly halfway between Lewiston-Auburn and Portland, on Gloucester Hill Road in New Gloucester.

== History ==
=== WTHT intellectual property ===
The first usage of the WTHT call sign in the Portland area was on 102.9 FM under the moniker of "FM 103", playing CHR/Top 40 music, licensed to Portland, and operating at 100,000 watts ERP from June 1987 until December 1989.

In 1989, an agreement was made between album rock station WBLM, which at the time was broadcasting on 107.5 FM, and WTHT to swap frequencies while retaining their respective call letters. At the time of the swap, the 107.5 FM frequency had an ERP of 50,000 watts and was licensed to Lewiston, a twin city with Auburn. This swap was intended to give WBLM a significantly stronger signal in Portland, as well as Central and Southern Maine, Eastern New Hampshire, and Northeastern Massachusetts; however, once the swap was complete, WTHT lost a significant amount of coverage, especially in extreme Southern Maine and Southeastern New Hampshire. In fact, during the summer tropospheric ducting season, WTHT often suffered from significant interference from WFCC-FM in Chatham, Massachusetts, also on 107.5 FM. This interference was often so significant that, at times, WTHT's signal was completely replaced by WFCC's signal in Southeastern New Hampshire and along the Maine coast from Kittery to the Biddeford/Saco area.

Once the swap with WBLM was complete, WTHT re-branded themselves as "Thunder 107", and retained their CHR format with a bit of a rhythmic lean, which was popular at the time. That format continued for a few years before being replaced in 1992 with oldies under a new moniker of "Oldies 107.5". Later, the oldies format was replaced by a country format known as "107.5 The Wolf". In April 2004, the WTHT calls, the country format, and the "Wolf" name were moved to 99.9 FM. The 107.5 FM frequency was then assigned the call letters WFNK and re-launched with a classic hits format under the name "107.5 Frank FM". This arrangement continues to this day.

=== 99.9 frequency ===
The 99.9 FM facility signed on in February 1977 as WWAV, "Wave 100", which aired an easy listening format. In 1983, WWAV became "Kiss 99.9" with a Top 40 format, and used the call letters WKZS. WKZS was an affiliate during the short syndicated run of Matty in the Morning from WXKS-FM in Boston.

Over time, WKZS adjusted its presentation to become a Hot AC, and in March 1997, the station reimaged to become "Mix 96.9 and 99.9", with the call letters WMWX following. In September 2000, the station brought back the "Kiss 99.9" name, this time using the call letters WMEK-FM. Promos at the time occasionally alluded to the station's translator, W245AA, on 96.9 FM in downtown Portland. The station's ratings, however, were relatively low.

On April 6, 2004, WMEK, along with its WMTW Broadcast Group radio sister stations, was sold to Nassau Broadcasting Partners. That same month, Nassau moved the country format of WTHT, then known as "107.5 The Wolf", to the 99.9 FM frequency, clearing the way for the launch of WFNK on the powerful 107.5 FM frequency. Since arriving on the frequency, WTHT has remained relatively unchanged.

WTHT, along with 16 other Nassau stations in northern New England, was purchased at bankruptcy auction by WBIN Media Company, a company controlled by Bill Binnie, on May 22, 2012. Binnie already owned WBIN-TV in Derry, New Hampshire. The deal was completed on November 30, 2012.

=== WBQQ ===
WBQQ signed on in November 1991 as a classical music station, branded as "WBACH". The station's programming would subsequently be expanded to several other Maine radio stations (including existing classical music stations WPKM in Scarborough and WAVX in Thomaston); in a 2008 format shuffle, WBACH programming in southern Maine was consolidated at 104.7 FM, and WBQQ was made a simulcast of WTHT. WBQQ was purchased on May 22, 2012, by WBIN Media Company in the same bankruptcy auction as WTHT.

On January 1, 2024, WBQQ split from its simulcast with country-formatted WTHT and launched a soft oldies format, branded as "99.3 The Wave".

== Translators ==
In addition to the main station, WTHT is relayed by an additional translator to widen its broadcast area.

Broadcast translator for WTHT
Call sign	Frequency	City of license	FID	ERP (W)	HAAT	Class	Transmitter coordinates	FCC info
W245AA	96.9 FM	Portland, Maine	24950	250	64 m (210 ft)	D	43°39′13.2″N 70°15′46.1″W	LMS

As of April 2013, W245AA began serving as a repeater of WTHT's HD2 channel, which simulcast the WBACH classical music format of Thomaston sister station WBQX. This returned the format to Portland for the first time since the 104.7 FM frequency became rhythmic top 40 station WHTP in September 2012. On February 18, 2017, W245AA switched back to a simulcast of WTHT's main signal.
