= Annie Bartlett Shepard =

American conservative activist (1861–1944)

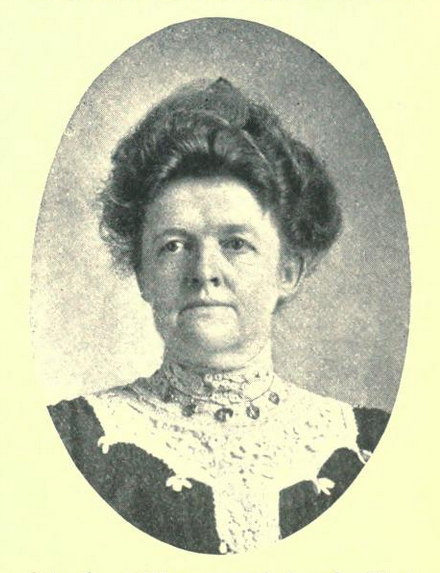
- Shepard in a 1919 publication

New Hampshire State Regent of the Daughters of the American Revolution
- In office 1907–1909
- President: Emily Nelson Ritchie McLean

Personal details
- Born: February 18, 1861 Nottingham, Rockingham, New Hampshire, USA
- Died: December 4, 1944 (aged 83) Boston, Suffolk, Massachusetts, USA
- Resting place: Forest Hill Cemetery, East Derry, New Hampshire, USA
- Spouse: Col. Frederick Johnson Shepard (m. 1887)
- Children: 3
- Relatives: Alan Shepard (grandson)
- Education: Lasell Seminary
- Occupation: woman's club leader and anti-suffragist

Annie Bartlett Shepard (née Bartlett; February 18, 1861 – December 4, 1944) was an American conservative activist, known for her opposition to women's suffrage and founding a chapter of the Daughters of the American Revolution (DAR). From 1907 to 1909, she served as the New Hampshire State Regent of the DAR.

== Life ==
She was born in 1861 in Nottingham, New Hampshire. Her parents were Thomas Bradbury Bartlett and Victoria Bartlett née Cilley. She was educated at public schools in Haverhill, Massachusetts, and Lasell Seminary, Auburndale, Massachusetts.

Before her marriage, she briefly worked as a teacher at the Derry Village School. She married Colonel Frederick Johnson Shepard, president of the Derry National Bank, on September 27, 1887. Three pieces of white lace from her wedding dress are held in the Perry-Dudley Family Archive and Shepard collection of the New Hampshire Historical Society. The Shepards had three sons.

Shepard was active in the civic life of Derry and was a member of many local committees and organizations. She sat on the Derry School Board for eight years, was a member of the East Derry Village Improvement Society, was a member of the Society for the Protection of New Hampshire Forests, and was chairman of the East Derry Red Cross Auxiliary. She attended the First Parish Congregational Church in East Derry, sang in their choir, and donated artifacts to the church.

Shepard was the founder and first regent of the Molly Reid Chapter of the DAR, established on October 27, 1894, as the descendant of Joseph Cilley, Colonel Thomas Bartlett, Joseph Nealley, Abraham True, Benjamin True and Nathaniel Batchelder. Two months before she died, she celebrated the 50th anniversary of the chapter. In 1905, she was elected state vice-regent of New Hampshire and then served as state regent between 1907 and 1909. She was also a member of the New Hampshire Society of Colonial Dames and the New England Historic Genealogical Society.

Shepard was an anti women's suffrage activist, and served as chairman of the Board of Directors of the New Hampshire Association Opposed to Woman Suffrage. She was the first female chairman of the Rockingham County Woman's Republican Club of New Hampshire from 1920 and was a charter member of the Derry Women's Club.

Shepard died in 1944 in Boston, Massachusetts.

== Legacy ==
In 2000, the land surrounding the original Shepard family homestead was donated to East Derry as a "gift to the Town of Derry from members of the Shepard family in honor of four generations of the family and their contributions to the town." It is now a conservation area.

In 2019, members of Derry's Molly Reid Chapter of DAR hosted a 125th anniversary ceremony by Shepard's grave at Forest Hill Cemetery, East Derry.

Her grandson Alan Bartlett Shepard was the first astronaut from the United States in space, and her maiden name was his middle name.
