= David Nelson (gamer) =

American electronic sports player

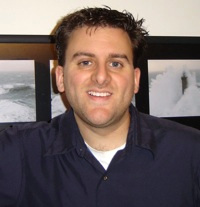
- David Nelson, of Derry, New Hampshire, holds many world records in the Guinness World Records - Gamer's Edition 2008.
- Born: January 18, 1974; New Hampshire
- Occupation: Arcade video game player

David Nelson (born January 18, 1974, in New Hampshire) is an American arcade video game player who holds world record high scores listed in the 2008 Guinness World Records-Gamer's Edition.

David Nelson has broken many world records while competing in classic arcade championships at the Funspot Family Fun Center in Weirs Beach, New Hampshire. As of 2008, David Nelson held more than 20 world records on arcade and console game titles.

In competitive play, Nelson took third place in the 2001 Classic Video Game World Championship. In 2006, David Nelson won two major divisional championships at the 2006 Funspot Classic Arcade Tournament, June 1–4, 2006. He won the "Color" competition, which featured a high-score contest on 10 different titles from the 1980-1985 era and he won the "Monochrome" Division, which featured titles from the 1970s. The year before, in 2005, at Funspot, he was co-crowned the 2005 "Player of the Year", sharing the title with Michael Sao Pedro of Massachusetts.

On November 11, 2005, David Nelson was designated Team Captain of the New England Chapter of the U.S. National Video Game Team. After years as a volunteer referee with Twin Galaxies, David Nelson was elevated to the position of Senior Referee and then, in 2008, assigned to the post of Chief Referee. Nelson was the presiding referee at the World Record Weekend competition held at the Challenge Arcade in Wyomissing, Pennsylvania, September 18–21, 2008—an official event to qualify for inclusion in the Guinness World Records- Gamer's Edition.

== Chronology of significant world records ==
Gaming achievements that hold 1st Place in the World

Date	Game	Score	Site	Platform
3/1/2000	X Games Pro Boarder	3,982	Home Submission	PlayStation
3/21/04	Avalanche	2,453	PhillyClassic 2004	Arcade
2/8/05	Warlords	96,125	Home Submission	MAME - INP
6/4/06	Super Princess Peach-Fastest	23.470	Funspot	Nintendo DS
4/14/07	APB	86,294	Funspot	Arcade
5/31/08	Astro Fighter	37,130	Funspot	Arcade
