= Sebasco Harbor Resort =

Coordinates: 43°46′02″N 69°51′45″W

Sebasco Harbor Resort, is a privately held destination resort located in Mid Coast Maine, 48 miles (77 km) north of Portland. It is situated at the tip of Popham Peninsula in the Town of Phippsburg, 12 miles (20 km) due south of Bath, Maine on over 550 acres (220 ha) and tidal estuaries. Founded in 1930 by bakery magnate Nathan Cushman, it was frequented by Eleanor Roosevelt.

Sebasco Harbor Resort contains over 133 guest rooms.

== History ==
In 2008, Sebasco Harbor Resort was named to Parents magazine's Best Beach Resorts for Families list. In 2011, it was named to Spa Index Guide to Spas Best of Family Spas (Maine) list

== Renovations ==
As part of a $12 million renovation, the Fairwinds Spa Suites.

== Amenities ==
There are two restaurants at the Resort – The Pilot House and The Ledges. Both restaurants focus on homegrown and local food purchasing from local and regional organic farmers, lobstermen, fishermen, cheesemakers, dairy farmers, and cattle ranchers. They are overseen by Executive Chef Melanie Houston a Maine Native, and graduate of Johnson & Wales University.

Sebasco Harbor Resort contains a 9-hole golf course and 3-hole regulation length course for beginners. Full-service waterfront spa, tennis courts, cruising boat, playground, fitness center, kayaking, recreation center, and lawn bowling. The Quarterdeck is a rec hall of the type made famous in the film, Dirty Dancing. In the summer, the Resort provides a day camp for children. Corporate retreats, weddings and family reunions are also held at the Resort.

Management: Bob Smith purchased Sebasco Harbor Resort in 1997. Michael J. Lynch is the General Manager/Partner.
