= Memories of Maine =

American magazine

- Cover of the summer 2014 edition
- Frequency: Every two months
- Country: United States
- Based in: Portland, Maine
- Language: English
- Website: https://memoriesofmainemagazine.com/

Memories of Maine is an American magazine which is published six times a year. Each issue covers the history of a different part of Maine. A free publication, the areas covered are Aroostook County, central and midcoast Maine, Down East Maine and western Maine. Some areas are covered twice. A Kennebec and Androscoggin Rivers edition has previously been published.

The magazine's editor is David Branch. Its main office is on Marginal Way in Portland, Maine.
