= East Derry, New Hampshire =

Unincorporated community in New Hampshire, United States

- Unincorporated community
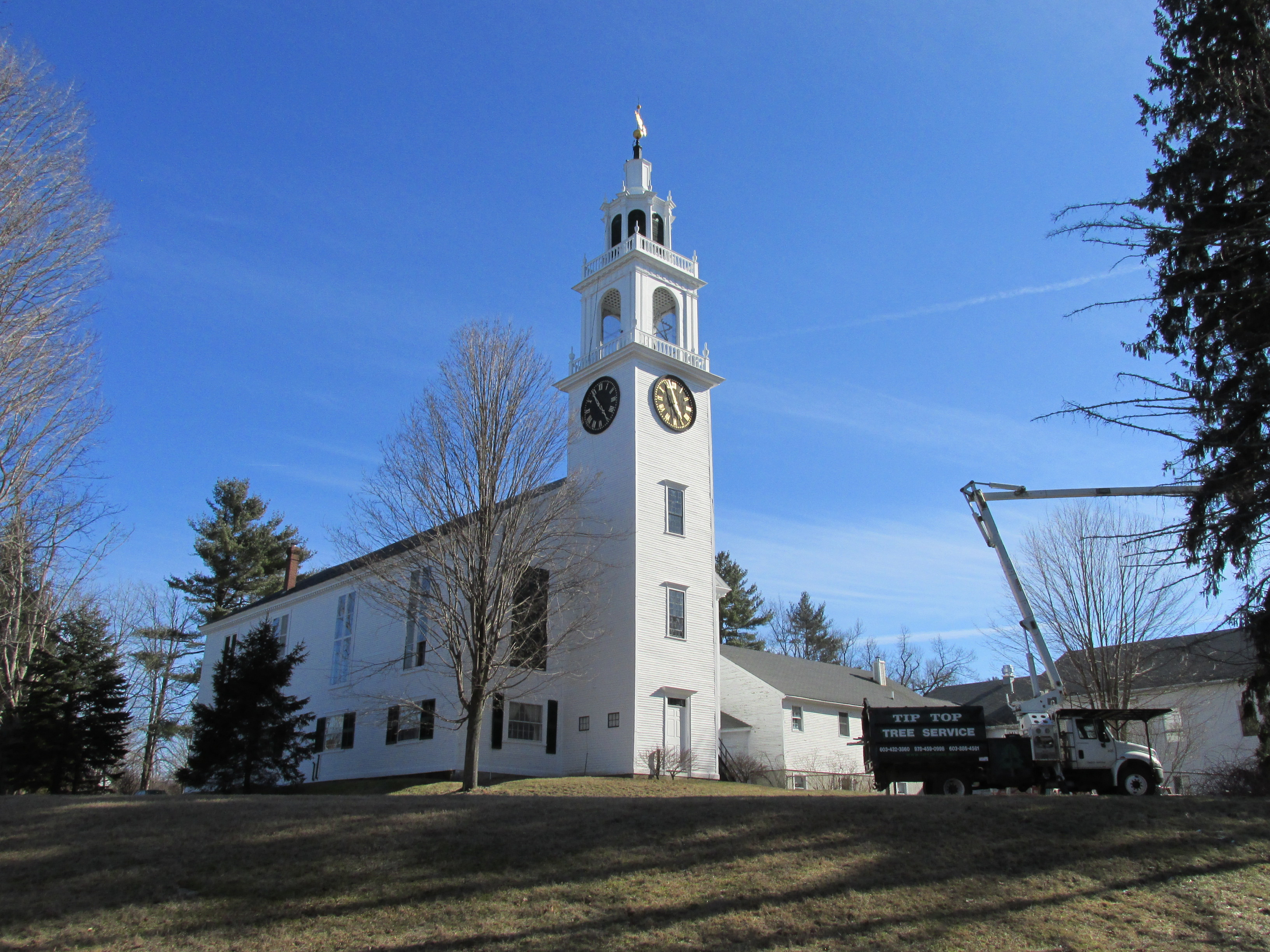
- First Parish Congregational Church

- Location within New Hampshire Location within the United States
- Coordinates: 42°53′40″N 71°17′28″W
- Country: United States
- State: New Hampshire
- County: Rockingham
- Town: Derry
- Elevation: 430 ft (130 m)
- Time zone: UTC-5 (Eastern (EST))
  - Summer (DST): UTC-4 (EDT)
- ZIP code: 03041
- Area code: 603
- GNIS feature ID: 866704

East Derry, also known as the Upper Village, is an unincorporated community in the town of Derry in Rockingham County, New Hampshire, United States. The village center constitutes the East Derry Historic District, listed on the National Register of Historic Places. It is located on a hill close to the geographic center of the town of Derry along East Derry Road, approximately 2 miles (3 km) east of Derry's downtown. East Derry has a separate ZIP code (03041) from the rest of the town of Derry. Alan Shepard lived in the village as a boy. Station #4 of the Derry Fire Department is located in the village.

== History ==
Derry's Upper Village area was settled in 1719 by Scots-Irish Presbyterians seeking to escape persecution in their homeland, and is the town's oldest settlement. The area was incorporated as part of Londonderry in 1722, and was split off and incorporated as Derry in 1827. The village's oldest building is the First Church, built in 1769 and enlarged in 1824. Behind the church is the cemetery in which many of its early settlers are buried. The village's growth was spurred by the Choate and MacGregor families in its early years, but affiliated with the church.

The village flourished as a somewhat independent entity in the 19th century, with its own post office and shops (one of which, dating to 1850, still stands on the north side of East Derry Road). The village was home to Derry's first secondary school, and was also home to John Pinkerton, founding benefactor of the Pinkerton Academy, a private school (founded 1814) which also serves the town's high school needs. It was also the location of the Adams Female Academy, founded in 1824; it was the first academy for women in New Hampshire.

The village center includes the Taylor Library, the 1875 town hall (now a historical society property), and a number of fine Federal period houses from the early 19th century. It also includes the childhood home of astronaut Alan Shepard.

== See also ==
- National Register of Historic Places listings in Rockingham County, New Hampshire
