= WBACH =

Classical music radio network in Maine (1991–2017)

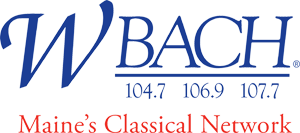
- Type: radio network
- Country: United States
- First air date: November 1991
- Availability: Maine
- Radio stations: WBQQ Kennebunk (1991–2008); WBQW Scarborough (1998–2012); WBQX Thomaston (1998–2017); WBQI Bar Harbor (2001–2012); W245AA Portland (2013–2017)
- Owner: Mariner Broadcasting (1991–2003); Nassau Broadcasting Partners (2003–2012); Binnie Media (2012–2017)
- Launch date: November 1991
- Dissolved: February 19, 2017

WBACH was a radio network in the state of Maine in the United States, active from 1991 to 2017. Airing on four stations at its peak, the network broadcast a classical music format from studios in Kennebunk.

Following the bankruptcy of Nassau Broadcasting Partners in 2011, the network's stations were sold off and largely converted to translators of other radio stations. The WBACH format and branding remained on one of the former network's stations, WBQX in Thomaston, and was added in 2013 to a new translator in Portland. The stations dropped the classical format in 2017.

== History ==
The WBACH format was launched in November 1991, initially airing on WBQQ 99.3 in Kennebunk. The station was founded by Mariner Broadcasting, and (after assembling its network) was acquired by Nassau Broadcasting Partners in 2003.

WBACH began to expand in 1998, when it bought another southern Maine classical music station, WPKM (106.3 FM) in Scarborough, and renamed it WBQW. WPKM's classical format, in turn, originated on 97.9 FM (now WJBQ) in 1971 as WDCS, moving to 106.3 in 1980 and becoming WPKM in 1988.

WBQX signed on in 1992 and was previously known as WAVX "The Classical Wave" (then simulcast with 101.7, the current WSVV). It also became part of the WBACH network in 1998.

WBQI was previously WMDI, the call letters standing for Mount Desert Island, the area in which the city of license, Bar Harbor, is located. It joined the WBACH network in 2001.

On October 6, 2008, WBACH realigned its southern Maine frequencies. WBQQ was removed from the network completely, shifting to a simulcast of WTHT, while WBQW moved from 106.3 to 104.7, swapping formats with active rock station WHXQ.

Nassau Broadcasting entered bankruptcy in 2011, which culminated in an auction of its stations. Prior to the conclusion of the auction, the Maine Public Broadcasting Network expressed interest in running the WBACH stations.

As part of Nassau Broadcasting's bankruptcy proceeding, WBQW was auctioned in May 2012 to Mainestream Media for $150,000, while the other WBACH stations, along with Nassau's 28 other northern New England stations, went to a partnership of WBIN-TV owner Bill Binnie and Jeff Shapiro. As part of the deal, 17 of the stations, including WBQX and WBQI, will be acquired by Binnie's WBIN Media Company. The purchase was consummated on November 30, 2012, at a price of $12.5 million. WBIN Media plans to resell WBQI to Blueberry Broadcasting. Mainestream Media began programming WBQW on September 13 with Christmas music en route to launching a Top 40/CHR format the next day (it now broadcasts as WHTP-FM and has since become a rhythmic contemporary radio station); this removed WBACH entirely from its original southern Maine market.

On August 7, 2012, WBQX was granted a construction permit to increase their ERP to 30,000 watts and to raise their height above sea level up to 232 meters (761 feet). The construction permit expired on August 7, 2015.

On November 30, 2012, WBQI split from its simulcast with WBQX and began simulcasting classic hits-formatted WABK-FM 104.3 from Gardiner. On January 3, 2013, WBQI changed its call sign to WBKA.

On April 15, 2013, WBQX returned to Portland through FM translator W245AA at 96.9 FM and WTHT's HD2 subchannel. Portland was previously served by WBQW.

On February 19, 2017, WBQX was replaced in Portland with a simulcast of WTHT and in Thomaston with a simulcast of WFNK. No reason was given for the sudden termination of the classical format.

== Stations ==
- WBQW and WBQQ both served York County, greater Portland and portions of the Seacoast Region (New Hampshire).
- WBQX served the Mid Coast primarily, but could also be heard in Augusta.
- WBQI served Down East Maine primarily, but could also be heard in Bangor.
