= WFNK =

Classic hits radio station in Lewiston, Maine

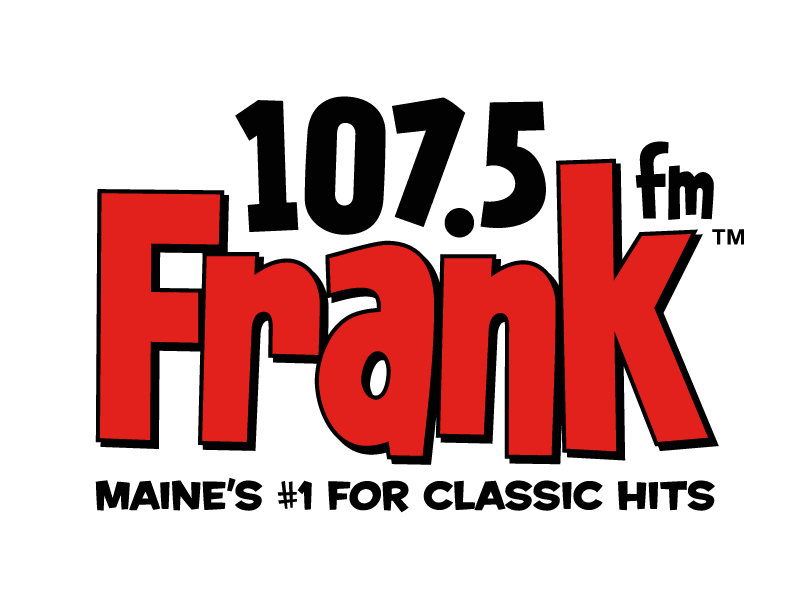
- Lewiston, Maine; United States
- Broadcast area: Portland Metropolitan Area; Lewiston-Auburn; Augusta, Maine; North Conway, New Hampshire
- Frequency: 107.5 MHz
- Branding: 107.5 Frank FM

Programming
- Format: Classic hits

Ownership
- Owner: Binnie Media; (WBIN Media Co., Inc.)
- Sister stations: WBQQ; WHXR; WTHT

History
- First air date: March 1, 1973
- Former call signs: WBLM (1973–1989); WTHT (1989–2004)
- Call sign meaning: Frank

Technical information
- Licensing authority: FCC
- Facility ID: 65675
- Class: C1
- ERP: 100,000 watts
- HAAT: 276 meters (906 ft)
- Transmitter coordinates: 44°0′15″N 70°25′24.1″W

Links
- Public license information: Public file; LMS
- Webcast: Listen live
- Website: 1075frank.com

WFNK (107.5 FM) – branded 107.5 Frank FM – is a commercial classic hits radio station licensed to serve Lewiston, Maine. Owned by Binnie Media, the station services the Portland metropolitan area. WFNK has an effective radiated power (ERP) of 100,000 watts, broadcasting from a transmitter in Poland, Maine, making it among the highest-powered FM stations in New England. Some WFNK programming is also heard on sister station WBQX in Thomaston, Maine, which also calls itself Frank FM.

WFNK is classified as a classic hits station, but it leans more toward classic rock. Core artists played include The Eagles, The Rolling Stones, Fleetwood Mac and Bruce Springsteen, but the station avoids more pop-leaning artists such as Michael Jackson, Madonna and Prince. Once a year, WFNK has a 1,000-song countdown of the greatest Frank FM songs, ending with the #1 song on Memorial Day. The station also plays its classic hits library from A to Z every September. WFNK is also known for its long-running campaigns in support of Portland's Barbara Bush Children's Hospital and Maine's Make-a-Wish chapter.

== History ==
On March 1, 1973, a station at 107.5 MHz first signed on in Lewiston as WBLM. It was owned by the Stereo Corporation, which owned no other stations. WBLM "The Blimp" was a progressive rock station, staffed by young disc jockeys playing a mostly free form radio format, in contrast to tightly programmed radio found on the AM dial. DJs were given the freedom to choose whatever rock albums they wanted to play and discuss topics in music, politics and lifestyles they felt motivated to cover. Over time, the station moved to a more structured album rock sound. In the 1980s, it was acquired by Fuller-Jeffrey Broadcasting, with longtime Maine broadcaster J. J. Jeffrey serving as co-owner and vice president.

In December 1989, WBLM switched call signs and frequencies with WTHT and became "Thunder 107", airing a contemporary hit radio format. WTHT's next format was oldies, and a few years later, went country, first as "New Country WTHT 107.5", and then "107-5 The Wolf". In 2004, WTHT was acquired by Nassau Broadcasting Partners, which had big plans for the station.

Since its founding, the station was hard to hear in parts of Portland and its suburbs, due to its 30,000-watt tower located 25 miles north of Maine's largest city. Nassau Broadcasting worked to give the station a major power boost, going from a Class B to Class C FM outlet. Power was increased to the maximum permitted in the U.S. under current guidelines, 100,000 watts. The tower height was also increased from 630 feet (190 m) to 928 feet (283 m). This gave the station a coverage area ranging from Biddeford and Sanford to the south, to Augusta and Rumford in the north.

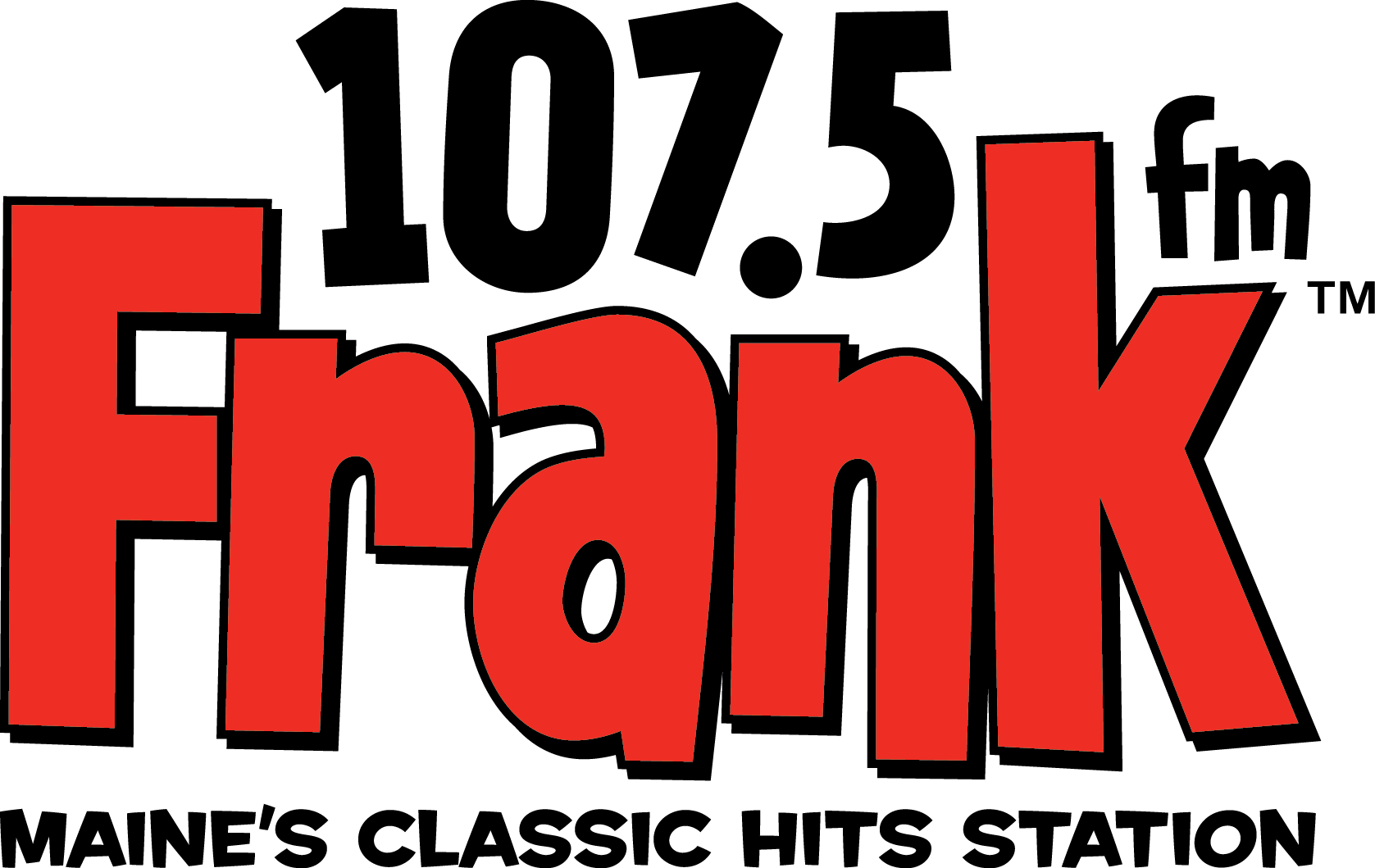
The original logo of 107.5 Frank FM, used from its launch on April 6, 2004, until April 1, 2020.

On April 6, 2004, WTHT began running a continuous recorded loop directing listeners to 99.9 FM, where "The Wolf" was relocated. A week later, WTHT switched to a classic hits format as WFNK "Frank FM". The station launch was backed by numerous TV commercials and other promotions, with WFNK quickly becoming a ratings success in the Portland radio market.

When it was launched, WFNK began jockless and commercial-free in the spring of 2004. Personalities were added by fall, including longtime morning host Bill Fox, midday DJ Chrissy Cavotta, and afternoon drive DJ Jim Kenton. Kenton was replaced by Leif Erickson in 2005, and Cavotta departed for WFLY in Albany, New York, in 2006. Heidi Knight became morning co-host in 2008, and Program Director Stan Bennett replaced Fox in the morning slot in 2010. Other morning co-hosts included market veterans Joe Lerman, Teddy McKay and Rick Johnson. The late Mike "Roberts" Tibbetts served as evening host for many years. Mark Persky, formerly of WBLM, had a short stint on the morning show as well. Local music blogger Holly Nunan joined on middays in 2015. WFNK had been hosted by all local personalities since its launch, but with other co-owned Frank FM stations around New England, management decided to have some DJs heard on other Frank stations.

On May 22, 2012, WFNK, along with 16 other stations in Northern New England formerly owned by Nassau Broadcasting Partners, was purchased at bankruptcy auction by WBIN Media Company, a company controlled by Bill Binnie. Binnie already owned WBIN-TV in Derry, New Hampshire. The deal was completed on November 30, 2012.

Former WEEI sports host Mikey Adams began hosting afternoons on WFNK via co-owned WFNQ in Nashua, New Hampshire, in late 2016, moving longtime host Leif Erickson to evenings; Erickson later returned to the afternoon drive time slot.
