= WBQX =

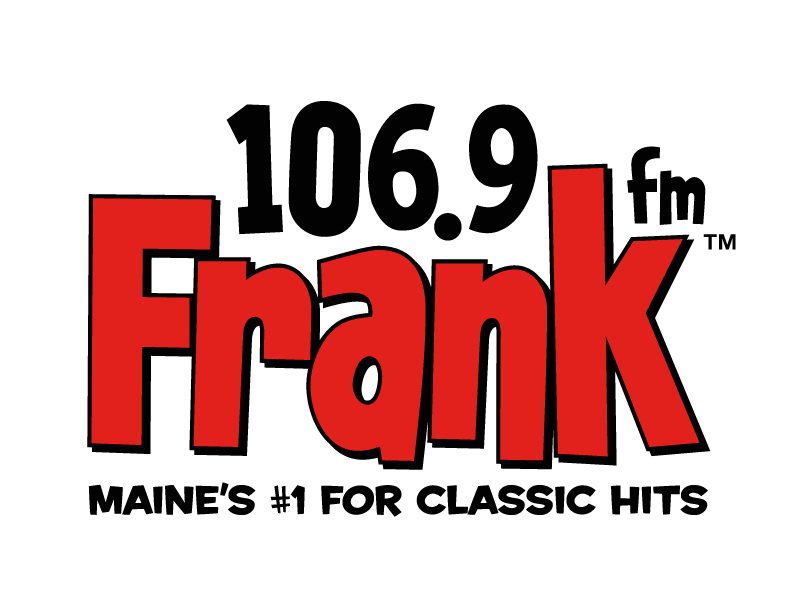
- Thomaston, Maine; United States
- Broadcast area: Mid Coast
- Frequency: 106.9 MHz
- Branding: 106.9 Frank FM

Programming
- Format: Classic hits

Ownership
- Owner: Binnie Media; (WBIN Media Co., Inc.)
- Sister stations: WBYA

History
- First air date: May 29, 1992
- Former call signs: WAVX (1990–1998)
- Call sign meaning: Station formerly carried WBACH, itself named for Johann Sebastian Bach

Technical information
- Licensing authority: FCC
- Facility ID: 49564
- Class: B
- ERP: 29,500 watts
- HAAT: 193 meters (633 ft)
- Transmitter coordinates: 44°6′30.2″N 69°9′26.1″W

Links
- Public license information: Public file; LMS
- Webcast: Listen live
- Website: 1069frank.com

WBQX (106.9 FM, "Frank FM") is a radio station broadcasting a classic hits music format. Licensed to Thomaston, Maine, United States, it serves the Mid Coast region. It first began broadcasting in 1992 under the call sign WAVX. The station is owned by Binnie Media. The station's competitor is WBAK in Belfast.

== History ==
The station signed on May 29, 1992, as WAVX, a classical music station owned by Northern Lights Broadcasting and branded as "The Classical Wave". In 1996, the station began simulcasting on WBYA (101.7 FM, now WSVV) in Searsport, which brought its programming to the Bangor area. Mariner Broadcasting bought WAVX in 1998 and made it a part of its WBACH network of classical stations under the call letters WBQX. Nassau Broadcasting Partners acquired Mariner in 2004.

Nassau Broadcasting entered bankruptcy in 2011, which culminated in an auction of its stations. Prior to the conclusion of the auction, the Maine Public Broadcasting Network expressed interest in running the WBACH stations. As part of the bankruptcy proceeding, WBQX, along with 29 other Nassau-owned northern New England radio stations, went to a partnership of WBIN-TV owner Bill Binnie and Jeff Shapiro; 17 of the stations, including WBQX, were acquired by Binnie's WBIN Media Company. The purchase was consummated on November 30, 2012, at a price of $12.5 million.

WBQX ended the classical music format on February 18, 2017; Binnie Media then transferred its classic hits format, branded "Frank FM", from WBYA (105.5 FM), which changed to country music on February 24. Much of the programming on WBQX is supplied by Portland sister station WFNK; the station also began airing coverage of local high school basketball games, which had previously aired on WBYA.
