= Derry, New Hampshire =

- Town
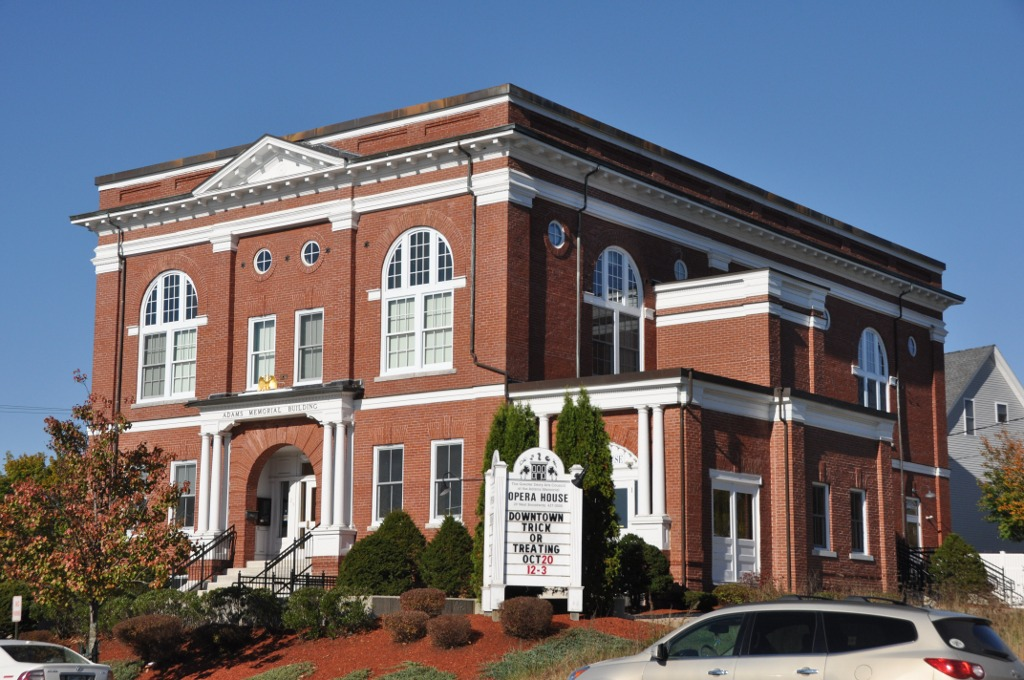
- The Adams Memorial Building, home of the Derry Opera House

- Flag Seal
- Nickname: "Spacetown"
- Location in Rockingham County, New Hampshire
- Coordinates: 42°52′50″N 71°19′38″W
- Country: United States
- State: New Hampshire
- County: Rockingham
- Incorporated: 1827
- Villages: Derry; East Derry

Government
  - Town Council: Members: Erin Spencer; Charles Foote; Daniel Healey; Randall Chase; Jack Webb; David Milz; Douglas Flood
  - Town Administrator: Mike Fowler

Area
  - Total: 36.3 sq mi (94.0 km^{2})
  - Land: 35.5 sq mi (91.9 km^{2})
  - Water: 0.81 sq mi (2.1 km^{2}) 2.26%
- Elevation: 282 ft (86 m)

Population (2020)
  - Total: 34,317
  - Density: 967/sq mi (373.5/km^{2})
- Time zone: UTC-5 (Eastern)
  - Summer (DST): UTC-4 (Eastern)
- ZIP code: 03038
- Area code: 603
- FIPS code: 33-17940
- GNIS feature ID: 0873578
- Website: www.derrynh.gov

Derry is a town in Rockingham County, New Hampshire, United States. The population was 34,317 at the 2020 census. Although it is a town and not a city, Derry is the most populous community in Rockingham County and the 4th most populous in the state. The town's nickname, "Spacetown", derives from the fact that Derry is the birthplace of Alan Shepard, the first astronaut from the United States in space. Derry was also for a time the home of the poet Robert Frost and his family.

The Derry census-designated place, with a 2020 population of 22,879, occupies the central part of the town, extending from Derry's downtown in the west to the town of Hampstead in the east. The town also includes the village of East Derry.

== History ==
The area was first settled by Scots-Irish families in 1719 as part of the town of Londonderry, as were present-day Windham and portions of Manchester, Salem and Hudson. The town of Derry was formed in 1827 from the eastern portion of Londonderry and was named, like Londonderry, after the city of Derry in Ireland. The first potato planted in the United States was sown in Derry in the town's common field in 1719. The town is the location of two of America's oldest private schools, Pinkerton Academy, founded in 1814 and still in operation, and the closed Adams Female Seminary.

Derry was once a linen and leather-making center until New England textile industries moved south in the 20th century. As recently as World War II, Derry was also a sleepy farming community. From 1900 to 1911, poet Robert Frost lived with his family on a farm in Derry purchased for him by his grandfather. The Robert Frost Farm is now a National Historic Landmark and state park and is open to the public for tours, poetry readings and other cultural events from spring through fall.

The post-war suburban boom, the town's proximity to Boston in the south and Manchester to the northwest, and the construction of Interstate 93 through town led to a huge population boom. After the 1990s, this growth disappeared, with the population remaining essentially unchanged since 2000.

The Manchester and Lawrence branch of the Boston and Maine Railroad ran through Derry, but is now abandoned, with most of the line in town now a rail trail. The New Hampshire Department of Transportation stated in its I-93 corridor transit study and its 2012 statewide rail plan that it could be feasible to reopen the line.

=== Historical postcards ===
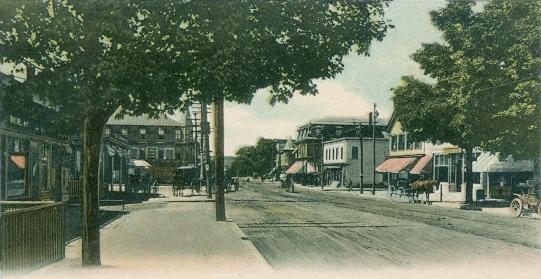
Broadway c. 1905

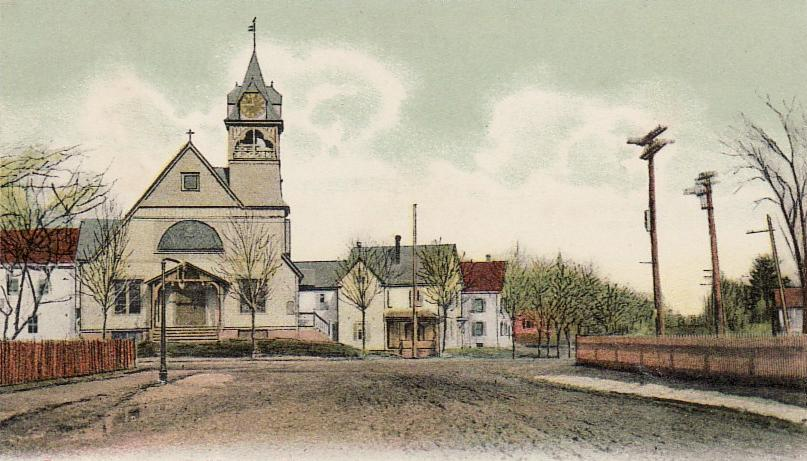
Birch Street c. 1905

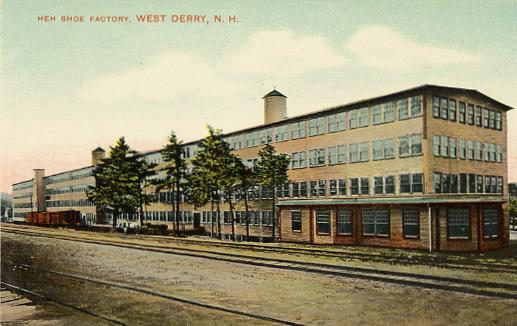
HEH Shoe Factory in 1909

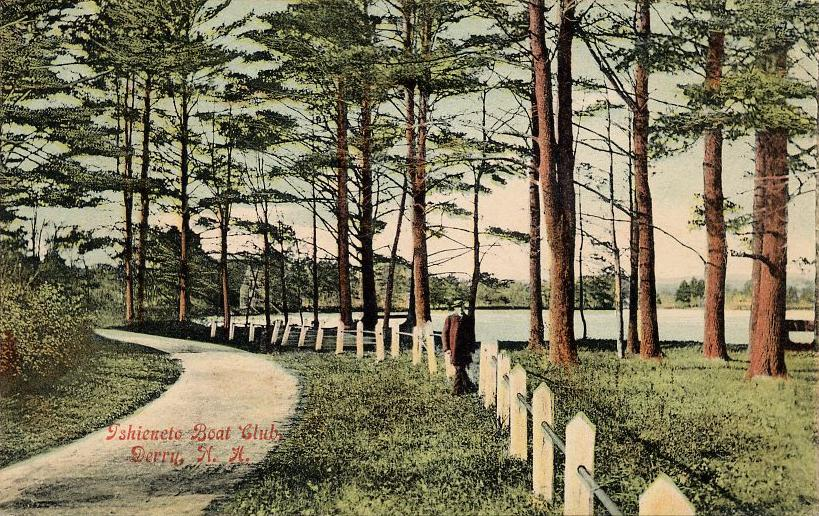
Tsienneto Boat Club c. 1910

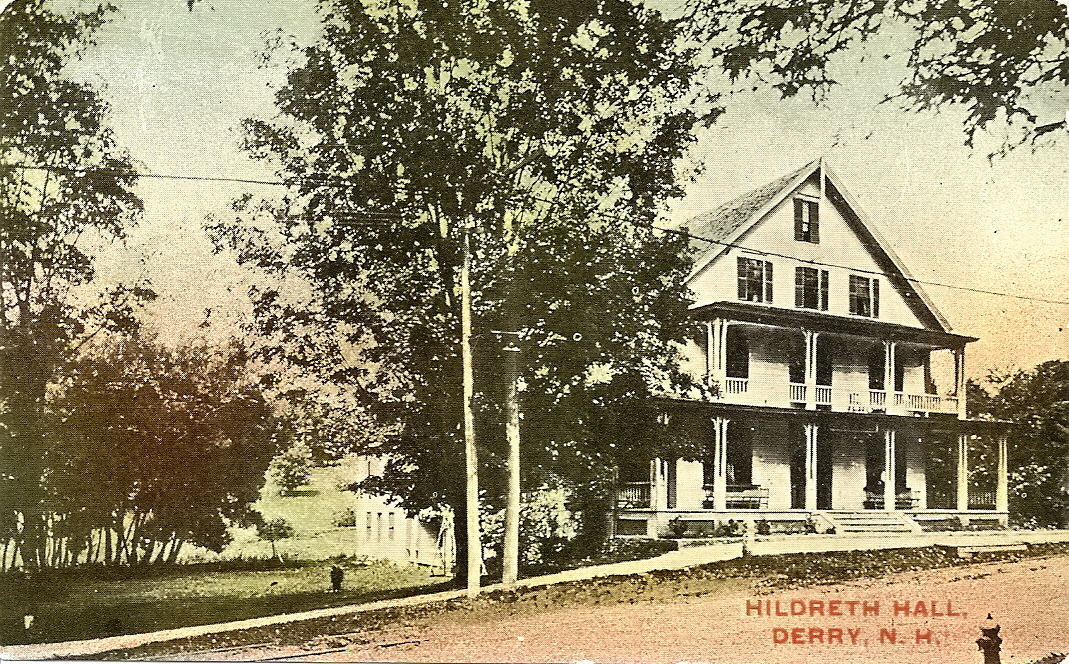
Hildreth Hall in 1914

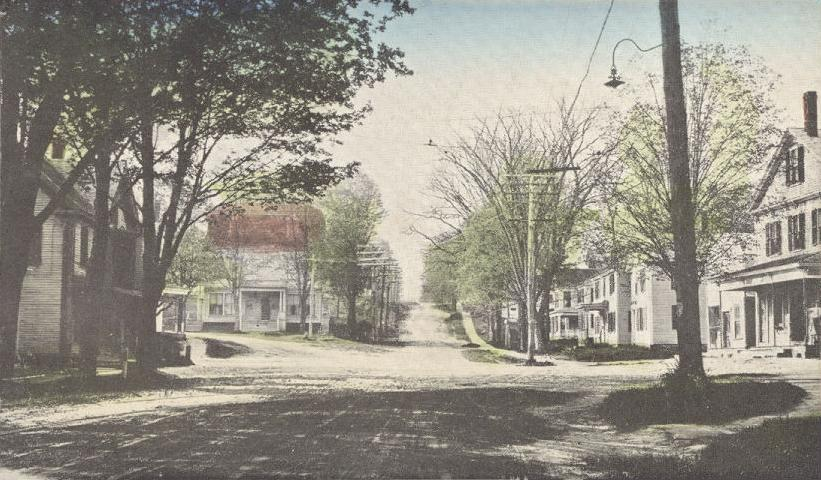
Thornton Square c. 1915

== Geography ==
Derry is in southern New Hampshire, in southwestern Rockingham County. It is 12 miles (19 km) southeast of Manchester, the state's largest city, and 16 miles (26 km) northwest of Lawrence, Massachusetts. The town is crossed by Interstate 93 and New Hampshire routes 28, 28 Bypass, and 102.

According to the United States Census Bureau, the town has a total area of 36.3 square miles (94.0 km^{2}), of which 35.5 square miles (91.9 km^{2}) are land and 0.81 square miles (2.1 km^{2}) are water, comprising 2.26% of the town. Derry is drained by Beaver Brook, a southward-flowing tributary of the Merrimack River. Island Pond is on the southeastern border of the town and drains to the Spicket River, another tributary of the Merrimack. A small section along the northern border of town drains north to the Exeter River, part of the Piscataqua River watershed. The highest point in the town is Warner Hill, at 605 feet (184 m) above sea level, where from the top one can see the Boston skyline on a clear day.

Derry's downtown is located near the town's western border at the intersection of Routes 102 and 28, and the village of East Derry is located approximately 2 miles (3 km) to the east and close to the geographic center of the town. Both areas are part of the Derry census-designated place.

=== Adjacent municipalities ===
- Chester (north)
- Sandown (northeast)
- Hampstead (east)
- Atkinson (southeast)
- Salem (southeast)
- Windham (south)
- Londonderry (west)
- Auburn (northwest)

=== Climate ===
Derry has a four-season humid continental climate (Köppen Dfa), with long, cold, snowy winters, and very warm and somewhat humid summers; spring and fall in between are crisp and relatively brief transitions. Precipitation is well-spread throughout the year, including snowfall in the winter.

== Demographics ==
Historical population
Census	Pop.	Note	%±
1830	2,178		—
1840	2,034		−6.6%
1850	1,850		−9.0%
1860	1,995		7.8%
1870	1,809		−9.3%
1880	2,140		18.3%
1890	2,604		21.7%
1900	3,583		37.6%
1910	5,123		43.0%
1920	5,382		5.1%
1930	5,131		−4.7%
1940	5,400		5.2%
1950	5,826		7.9%
1960	6,987		19.9%
1970	11,712		67.6%
1980	18,875		61.2%
1990	29,603		56.8%
2000	34,021		14.9%
2010	33,109		−2.7%
2020	34,317		3.6%
U.S. Decennial Census

As of the 2020 census, there were 34,317 people residing in the town. The racial makeup of the town was 88.1% White, 2.3% African American, 1.8% American Indian and Alaska Native, 2.3% Asian, 0.1% Pacific Islander, 0.9% some other race, and 1.7% from two or more races. 4.6% of the population were Hispanic or Latino of any race.

As of the census of 2010, there were 12,537 households, out of which 35.0% had children under the age of 18 living with them, 52.4% had a married couple living together, 12.2% had a woman whose husband does not live with her, and 30.1% were non-families. 23.0% of all households were made up of individuals, and 6.4% had someone living alone who was 65 years of age or older. The average household size was 2.62, and the average family size was 3.10.

In the town, the population was spread out, with 24.7% under the age of 18, 9.3% from 18 to 24, 27.0% from 25 to 44, 30.4% from 45 to 64, and 8.7% who were 65 years of age or older. The median age was 38.2 years. For every 100 females, there were 98.6 males. For every 100 females age 18 and over, there were 95.9 males.

At the 2000 census the median income for a household in the town was $54,634, and the median income for a family was $61,625. Males had a median income of $41,271 versus $30,108 for females. The per capita income for the town was $22,315. 4.6% of the population and 3.3% of families were below the poverty line. Out of the total people living in poverty, 5.0% were under the age of 18 and 7.1% were 65 or older.

== Government ==
Derry town vote by party in presidential elections
Year	Democratic	Republican	Third Parties
2024	43.27% 7,851	55.05% 9,989	0.84% 153
2020	45.91% 8,215	52.60% 9,412	1.49% 267
2016	40.35% 6,825	54.62% 9,237	5.03% 851
2012	46.87% 7,612	51.42% 8,350	1.71% 277
2008	47.86% 7,527	50.51% 7,944	1.63% 257
2004	45.33% 6,760	53.90% 8,038	0.77% 114
2000	45.57% 5,530	50.21% 6,093	4.22% 512
1996	45.55% 4,814	42.61% 4,503	11.85% 1,252
1992	32.57% 3,962	39.04% 4,750	28.39% 3,454
1988	30.72% 2,845	67.52% 6,253	1.76% 163
1984	26.24% 1,972	73.19% 5,501	0.57% 43
1980	23.53% 1,519	62.89% 4,060	13.58% 877
1976	40.91% 2,272	56.61% 3,144	2.48% 138
1972	30.17% 1,526	67.69% 3,424	2.14% 108
1968	35.03% 1,476	56.74% 2,391	8.23% 347
1964	53.09% 1,882	46.91% 1,663	0.00% 0
1960	39.24% 1,313	60.76% 2,033	0.00% 0

In the New Hampshire Senate, Derry is in the 19th district and is currently represented by Republican Regina Birdsell. On the Executive Council of New Hampshire, Derry is in district 3 and is currently represented by Republican Janet Stevens. In the U.S. House of Representatives, Derry is included in New Hampshire's 1st congressional district and is currently represented by Democrat Chris Pappas.

Derry is part of a reliably Republican belt of dense, populous towns along Interstate 93 near the Massachusetts border. Derry leans Republican in presidential elections. Bill Clinton did manage to carry the town with a plurality of the vote in 1996. No Democrat has won a majority of Derry's voters since Lyndon B. Johnson's landslide election in 1964.

== Economy ==
=== Top employers ===
According to the town's 2020 Comprehensive Annual Financial Report, the top employers in the town are the following:

#	Employer	# of employees
1	Derry Cooperative School District	620
2	HCA Health Services of New Hampshire (Parkland Medical Center)	532
3	Pinkerton Academy	462
4	Town of Derry	364
5	Walmart	265
6	Hannaford	142
7	Shaw's	105
8	Fireye	100
9	Benson's Hardware	50
10	Total Air Supply	40

== Transportation ==
Five New Hampshire state highways and one Interstate Highway cross the town of Derry:

- NH 28 enters from Salem in the south, follows Rockingham Road north to the southern limit of the town's main business district, then turns west along with Rockingham Road toward an intersection with Windham Road and Kendall Pond Road (Shute's Corner), and then north to follow Birch Street. After crossing NH 102, it becomes Crystal Avenue, and finally at Tsienneto Road changes names again to Manchester Road before entering Londonderry in the western part of town.
- NH 28 Bypass, known locally as "The Bypass", begins at South Main Street where NH 28 turns along with Rockingham Road, and continues on South Main Street, North Main Street, and Londonderry Turnpike before crossing the extreme northwestern corner of town and entering Auburn.
- NH 102 enters in the west from Londonderry, where it is known locally as Broadway. Running southwest to northeast, it crosses North and South Main Street (NH 28 Bypass) and East Derry Road at a traffic circle in the center of town (Danforth Circle), from where it follows Chester Road to the northern border with the town of Chester.
- NH 111 crosses the extreme southeastern corner of town, entering from Salem in the south, and passing into Atkinson in the east. There is only one intersection in the town, with Island Pond Road, with NH 111 spending less than 1/2 mile in Derry.
- NH 121 crosses the extreme northeastern corner of town for a few hundred feet between Hampstead and Sandown. There are no intersections on this stretch of NH 121 that connect to the rest of Derry, though Hampstead Road intersects NH 121 a few feet from the Derry border with Hampstead some distance to the south.
- Interstate 93 crosses the southwestern corner of Derry, for less than 1 mile. There are no interchanges in the town, but the interchange with NH 102 in Londonderry is less than 1,000 feet from the town line.

The nearest air transport is Manchester–Boston Regional Airport. There is currently no passenger rail service in Derry, though a former train depot in the center of town has been converted to a hub for the main commercial district in town. Amtrak provides Downeaster service and the MBTA' Haverhill Line at Haverhill station, 32 miles (51 km) to the southeast.

== Education ==
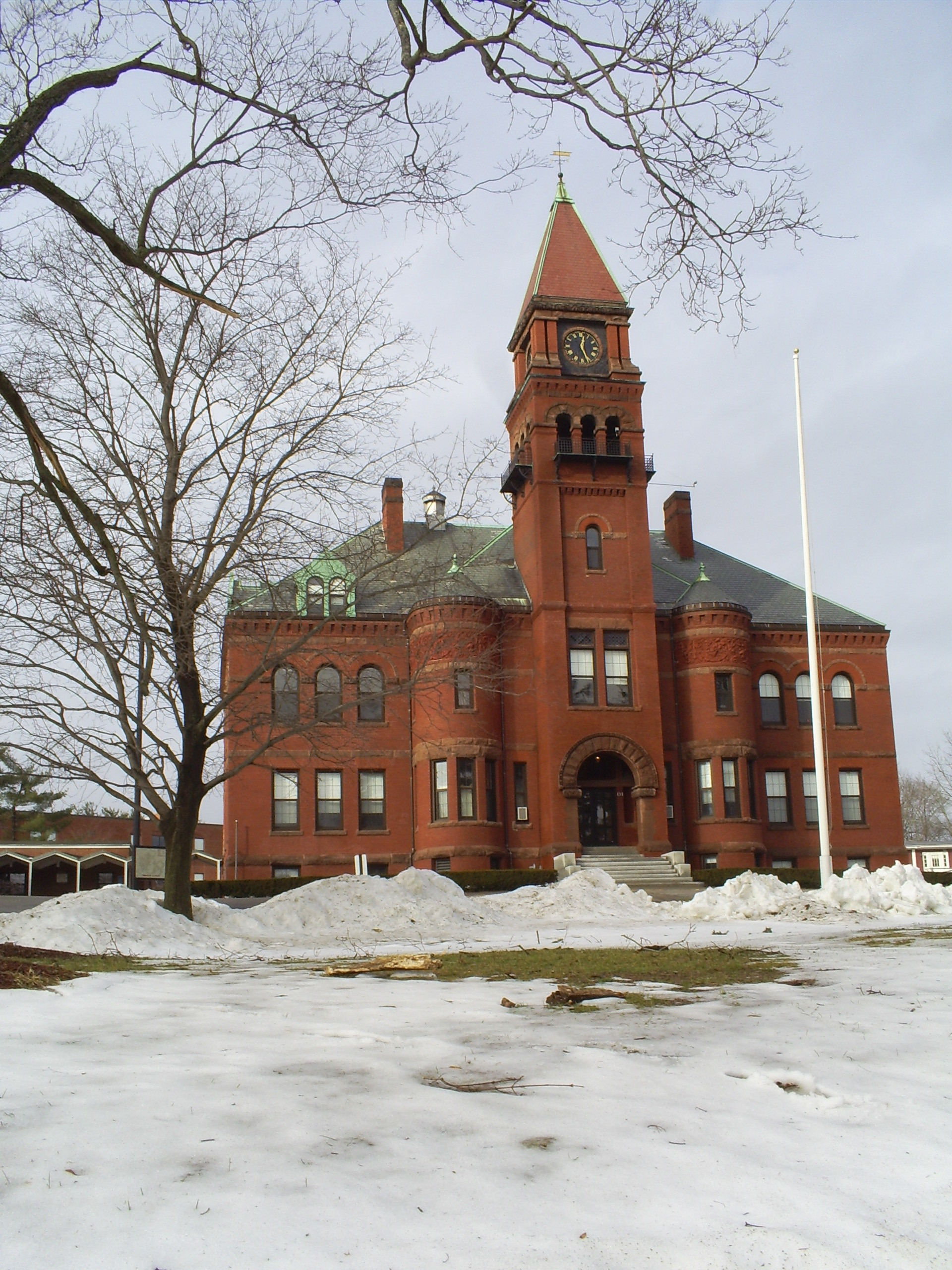
Pinkerton Academy

=== Public schools ===
- Administration:
  - Derry Cooperative School District
- Elementary:
  - Ernest P. Barka Elementary School
  - East Derry Memorial Elementary School
  - Grinnell Elementary School
  - South Range Elementary School
- Middle:
  - Gilbert H. Hood Middle School
  - West Running Brook Middle School

Pinkerton Academy is an independently incorporated high school serving as the public high school for Derry, Chester, Hampstead, Auburn, Hooksett, and Candia

=== Private schools ===
- Nutfield Cooperative School (pre-school and kindergarten)
- Next Charter School (grades 9 through 12)

== Media ==
Derry is home to two media sources, the weekly Derry News, which is owned by The Eagle-Tribune and television station WWJE-DT, owned by Univision Communications. Derry is located within the Boston television market and the Manchester radio market. Derry Community Television, also known as DerryCAM, is the town's public-access television station on local cable TV.

The weekly Nutfield News, which was locally owned by Nutfield Publishing, was published until December 2022.

== Notable people ==
- Samantha Brown (born 1970), former host of Travel Channel
- Caleb Chapman (born 1973), musician
- Charles Cogswell Doe (1830–1896), Chief Justice of the Supreme Court of New Hampshire
- Tricia Dunn-Luoma (born 1974), hockey player; Olympic gold medalist
- Charles Miller Floyd (1861–1923), 51st governor of New Hampshire
- Robert Frost (1874–1963), four-time Pulitzer Prize-winning poet
- Gary Indiana (1950–2024), writer, artist and critic
- Brendan James (born 1979), singer-songwriter, pianist
- Phyllis Katsakiores (born 1934), state representative
- Priscilla Lane (1915–1995), actress
- David Nelson (born 1974), world-record-holding video game competitor
- William Patterson (1789–1838), U.S. congressman
- Joe Seiders (born 1980), musician
- Alan Shepard (1923–1998), astronaut, first American in space
- Annie Bartlett Shepard (1861–1944), founder of a chapter of the Daughters of the American Revolution
- Pamela Smart (born 1967), convicted conspirator to murder
- John Stark (1728–1822), Continental Army major general in the Revolutionary War
- Aaron Fletcher Stevens (1819–1887), brigadier general, U.S. congressman
- Matt Taven (born 1985), professional wrestler
- Paul Thompson (born 1988), hockey player
- Matthew Thornton (1714–1803), signed the United States Declaration of Independence
- Nikki Tilroe (1941–2005), performer, puppeteer
- Ryan Tuerck (born 1985), Formula D Drift professional driver

== Sites of interest ==
- Adams Memorial Building
- Derry Historical Society and Museum
- Robert Frost Farm, National Historic Landmark
- Taylor Mill State Historic Site
- Rockingham Recreational Trail, rail trail to Fremont

== Sister cities ==
- Cherepovets, Vologda Oblast, Russia
