= List of radio stations in Maine =

The following is a list of FCC-licensed radio stations in the U.S. state of Maine, which can be sorted by their call signs, frequencies, cities of license, licensees, and programming formats.

== List of radio stations ==
Call sign	Frequency	City of License	Licensee	Format
WABK-FM	104.3 FM	Gardiner	Blueberry Broadcasting, LLC	Classic hits
WALZ-FM	95.3 FM	Machias	William McVicar & Roger Holst, Gen. Partnership	Classic hits
WARX	93.9 FM	Lewiston	Educational Media Foundation	Contemporary Christian (Air1)
WBAE	1490 AM	Portland	Saga Communications of New England, LLC	Soft adult contemporary
WBAK	104.7 FM	Belfast	Blueberry Broadcasting, LLC	Classic hits
WBAN	1340 AM	Veazie	Port Broadcasting, LLC	Adult contemporary
WBCI	105.9 FM	Bath	Blount Communications, Inc.	Religious
WBCQ-FM	94.7 FM	Monticello	Allan H. Weiner & Barbara A. Weiner, d/b/a/ WBCQ Radio	Classic country
WBFB	97.1 FM	Bangor	Blueberry Broadcasting, LLC	Country
WBFE	99.1 FM	Bar Harbor	Blueberry Broadcasting, LLC	Country
WBFY-LP	100.9 FM	Belfast	City of Belfast, ME	Variety (City owned radio station)
WBKA	107.7 FM	Bar Harbor	WBIN Media Co., Inc.	Classic hits
WBLM	102.9 FM	Portland	Townsquare License, LLC	Classic rock
WBOR	91.1 FM	Brunswick	Bowdoin College	College radio
WBPW	96.9 FM	Presque Isle	Townsquare Media Licensee of Peoria, Inc.	Country
WBQA	96.7 FM	Boothbay Harbor	Maine Public Broadcasting Corporation	Classical music
WBQE	93.7 FM	Milbridge	Maine Public Broadcasting Corporation	Classical music
WBQF	91.7 FM	Fryeburg	Maine Public Broadcasting Corporation	Classical music
WBQQ	99.3 FM	Kennebunk	WBIN Media Co., Inc.	Soft oldies
WBQX	106.9 FM	Thomaston	WBIN Media Co., Inc.	Classic hits
WBYA	105.5 FM	Islesboro	WBIN Media Co., Inc.	Soft adult contemporary
WBZN	107.3 FM	Old Town	Townsquare License, LLC	Top 40 (CHR)
WCLZ	98.9 FM	North Yarmouth	Saga Communications of New England, LLC	Adult album alternative
WCME	900 AM	Brunswick	James B. Bleikamp	Adult contemporary
WCRQ	102.9 FM	Dennysville	WQDY, Inc.	Country
WCTB	93.5 FM	Fairfield	J. Hanson Company, Inc.	Classic country
WCXU	97.7 FM	Caribou	The Canxus Broadcasting Corporation	Classic hits
WCXV	98.1 FM	Van Buren	The Canxus Broadcasting Corporation	Classic hits
WCXX	102.3 FM	Madawaska	The Canxus Broadcasting Corporation	Classic hits
WCYY	94.3 FM	Biddeford	Townsquare License, LLC	Alternative rock
WDEA	1370 AM	Ellsworth	Townsquare License, LLC	Adult standards/MOR
WEBB	98.5 FM	Waterville	Townsquare License, LLC	Country
WEGP	1390 AM	Presque Isle	Relevant Radio, Inc.	Catholic
WERU-FM	89.9 FM	Blue Hill	Salt Pond Community Broadcasting Company	Variety, Community radio
WEZQ	92.9 FM	Bangor	Townsquare License, LLC	Sports (ESPN)
WEZR	780 AM	Rumford	Bennett Radio Group, LLC	Conservative talk
WFHP-LP	97.5 FM	Fort Kent	Fort Kent Knights of Columbus, Inc.	Catholic
WFMX	107.9 FM	Skowhegan	J. Hanson Company, Inc.	Adult contemporary
WFNK	107.5 FM	Lewiston	WBIN Media Co., Inc.	Classic hits
WFST	600 AM	Caribou	Northern Broadcast Ministries, Inc.	Religious
WGAN	560 AM	Portland	Saga Communications of New England, LLC	News/Talk
WGUY	1230 AM	Veazie	Port Broadcasting, LLC	Classic country
WGWM	91.5 FM	Trevett	Barters Island Baptist Church	
WGYS	91.9 FM	Rumford	River Valley Community Ministries	
WHCF	88.5 FM	Bangor	Lighthouse Radio Network, Inc.	Contemporary Christian
WHMX	105.7 FM	Lincoln	Lighthouse Radio Network, Inc.	Contemporary Christian
WHOU-FM	100.1 FM	Houlton	Northern Maine Media, Inc.	Classic hits
WHPW-LP	97.3 FM	Harpswell	Harpswell Radio Project, Inc.	Variety
WHSN	89.3 FM	Bangor	Husson College	Alternative rock
WHTP	1280 AM	Gardiner	MaineInvests, LLC	Rhythmic contemporary
WHTP-FM	104.7 FM	Kennebunkport	Mainestream Media, LLC	Rhythmic contemporary
WHXR	106.3 FM	Scarborough	WBIN Media Co., Inc.	Active rock
WHZP	1400 AM	Veazie	MaineInvests, LLC	Rhythmic contemporary
WIGY	1240 AM	Lewiston	Bennett Radio Group, LLC	Classic hits
WIGY-FM	100.7 FM	Mexico	Bennett Radio Group, LLC	Country
WJBQ	97.9 FM	Portland	Townsquare License, LLC	Top 40 (CHR)
WJCX	99.5 FM	Pittsfield	Calvary Chapel of Bangor	Contemporary Christian
WJJB-FM	96.3 FM	Gray	Atlantic Coast Radio, LLC	Sports (FSR)
WJZN	1400 AM	Augusta	Townsquare License, LLC	Alternative rock
WJZP-LP	107.9 FM	Portland	All Inclusive, Inc.	Jazz
WKIT	100.3 FM	Brewer	The Zone Corporation	Mainstream rock
WKSQ	94.5 FM	Ellsworth	Blueberry Broadcasting, LLC	Adult contemporary
WKTJ-FM	99.3 FM	Farmington	Katahdin Communications, Inc.	Adult hits
WLAM	1470 AM	Lewiston	Blue Jey Broadcasting Co.	Oldies
WLOB	1310 AM	Portland	Atlantic Coast Radio, LLC	News/Talk
WMCM	103.3 FM	Rockland	Blueberry Broadcasting, LLC	Country
WMDR	1340 AM	Augusta	Light of Life Ministries, Inc.	Christian Children's
WMDR-FM	88.9 FM	Oakland	Light of Life Ministries Inc	Southern gospel
WMEA	90.1 FM	Portland	Maine Public Broadcasting Corporation	Public radio
WMEB-FM	91.9 FM	Orono	University of Maine System	College radio
WMED	89.7 FM	Calais	Maine Public Broadcasting Corporation	Public radio
WMEF	106.5 FM	Fort Kent	Maine Public Broadcasting Corporation	Public radio
WMEH	90.9 FM	Bangor	Maine Public Broadcasting Corporation	Public radio
WMEK	88.1 FM	Kennebunkport	Word Radio Educational Foundation	Christian
WMEM	106.1 FM	Presque Isle	Maine Public Broadcasting Corporation	Public radio
WMEP	90.5 FM	Camden	Maine Public Broadcasting Corporation	Public radio
WMEW	91.3 FM	Waterville	Maine Public Broadcasting Corporation	Public radio
WMEY	88.1 FM	Bowdoin	Light of Life Ministries, Inc.	Contemporary Christian
WMGX	93.1 FM	Portland	Saga Communications of New England, LLC	Adult top 40
WMHB	89.7 FM	Waterville	The Mayflower Hill Broadcasting Corp.	Variety, college radio
WMME-FM	92.3 FM	Augusta	Townsquare License, LLC	Top 40 (CHR)
WMPF	91.1 FM	Rumford	River Valley Community Association	Variety
WMPG	90.9 FM	Gorham	University of Maine System	Community radio
WMSJ	89.3 FM	Freeport	Educational Media Foundation	Contemporary Christian (K-Love)
WNSX	97.7 FM	Winter Harbor	Stony Creek Broadcasting, LLC	Classic hits
WOXO-FM	92.7 FM	Norway	Bennett Radio Group, LLC	Country
WOZI	101.9 FM	Presque Isle	Townsquare Media Presque Isle License, LLC	Classic rock
WPEI	95.9 FM	Saco	Atlantic Coast Radio, LLC	Sports (ESPN/FSR)
WPKC-FM	92.1 FM	Sanford	Educational Media Foundation	Contemporary Christian (K-Love)
WPNO	1450 AM	South Paris	Bennett Radio Group, LLC	Conservative talk
WPOR	101.9 FM	Portland	Saga Communications of New England, LLC	Country
WPPI	95.5 FM	Topsham	Atlantic Coast Radio, LLC	Sports (ESPN/FSR)
WQCB	106.5 FM	Brewer	Townsquare License, LLC	Country
WQDY-FM	92.7 FM	Calais	WQDY, Inc.	Classic hits
WQHR	96.1 FM	Presque Isle	Townsquare Media Presque Isle License, LLC	Hot adult contemporary
WQSK	97.5 FM	Madison	Blueberry Broadcasting, LLC	Adult contemporary
WQSS	102.5 FM	Camden	Blueberry Broadcasting, LLC	Adult contemporary music
WRBC	91.5 FM	Lewiston	President & Trustees of Bates College	Variety
WRED	1440 AM	Westbrook	Atlantic Coast Radio, LLC	Sports (FSR)
WRFR-LP	93.3 FM	Rockland	The Old School	Variety
WRGY	90.5 FM	Rangeley	Tranet	Community radio
WRKJ	88.5 FM	Westbrook	Word Radio Educational Foundation	Christian
WRNM	91.7 FM	Ellsworth	Light of Life Ministries, Inc.	Southern gospel
WRPB	89.1 FM	Benedicta	Light of Life Ministries, Inc.	Southern gospel
WSEW	88.7 FM	Sanford	Word Radio Educational Foundation	Christian
WSHD	91.7 FM	Eastport	Shead Memorial High School	Variety
WSHD-LP	93.3 FM	Eastport	Shead Memorial High School	Variety
WSHK	105.3 FM	Kittery	Townsquare License, LLC	Classic hits
WSKW	1160 AM	Skowhegan	J. Hanson Company, Inc.	Sports (ISN)
WSVP-LP	105.7 FM	Springvale	Springvale Council Knights of Columbus	Catholic
WSVV	101.7 FM	Searsport	Educational Media Foundation	Contemporary Christian (K-Love)
WSYY	1240 AM	Millinocket	Katahdin Broadcasting, Inc.	Talk
WSYY-FM	94.9 FM	Millinocket	Katahdin Communications, Inc.	Adult hits
WTBP	89.7 FM	Bath	Relevant Radio, Inc.	Catholic
WTBU	95.3 FM	York Center	iHM Licenses, LLC	Country
WTHT	99.9 FM	Auburn	WBIN Media Co., Inc.	Country
WTNP-LP	100.7 FM	Waterville	Sonlight Media Group	Christian
WTOS	910 AM	Bangor	Blueberry Broadcasting, LLC	Mainstream rock
WTOS-FM	105.1 FM	Skowhegan	Blueberry Broadcasting, LLC	Mainstream rock
WTUX	101.1 FM	Gouldsboro	Blueberry Broadcasting, LLC	Mainstream rock
WUMF	91.5 FM	Farmington	University of Maine System	College radio
WUMM	91.1 FM	Machias	University of Maine System	Eclectic
WUPI	92.1 FM	Presque Isle	University of Maine System	College radio
WVAE	1400 AM	Biddeford	Saga Communications of New England, LLC	Soft adult contemporary
WVOM-FM	103.9 FM	Howland	Blueberry Broadcasting, LLC	News/Talk
WVQM	101.3 FM	Augusta	Blueberry Broadcasting, LLC	News/Talk
WWLN	91.5 FM	Lincoln	Light of Life Ministries, Inc.	Southern gospel
WWMJ	95.7 FM	Ellsworth	Townsquare License, LLC	Classic rock
WWSF	1220 AM	Sanford	Port Broadcasting, LLC	Classic hits
WWTP	89.5 FM	Augusta	Relevant Radio, Inc.	Catholic
WWWA	95.3 FM	Winslow	Light of Life Ministries, Inc.	Contemporary Christian
WXBP	90.3 FM	Corinth	Relevant Radio, Inc.	Catholic
WXME	780 AM	Monticello	Allan H. Weiner	Oldies
WXNZ-LP	98.1 FM	Skowhegan	Wesserunsett Arts Council	Variety
WXTP	106.7 FM	North Windham	Relevant Radio, Inc.	Catholic
WYAR	88.3 FM	Yarmouth	Heritage Radio Society, Inc.	Educational
WYFP	91.9 FM	Harpswell	Bible Broadcasting Network, Inc.	Conservative religious (Bible Broadcasting Network)
WYNZ	100.9 FM	South Portland	Saga Communications of New England, LLC	Adult hits
WZLO	103.1 FM	Dover-Foxcroft	The Zone Corporation	Adult contemporary
WZON	620 AM	Bangor	The Zone Corporation	Silent
WZVV	102.1 FM	Dexter	Educational Media Foundation	Contemporary Christian (K-Love)

== Defunct ==
- WALZ
- WBME
- WHGS
- WJTO
- WKZX
- WLVC
- WLVP
- WMB
- WMNE
- WNSW
- WQDY
- WSJR
- WTVL
- WVOM
- WZAN
- WMPF-LP: converted to full power.
- WGYS-LP: converted to full power.
