= Black Bear Sports Network =

American collegiate sports radio network

Black Bear Sports Network is the radio and television name for University of Maine sports. The radio affiliates broadcast football, men's and women's basketball, men's ice hockey and select baseball and softball games. The current network formed in the summer of 2007 when Learfield Sports took over the marketing for the Maine Black Bears. Previous to this the radio network was known as The Sports Zone Black Bear Network and was heard on Bangor, Maine ESPN Radio affiliate WZON, at times including WLOB and WEGP.

WABI-TV, Bangor's CBS affiliate was the long-time television home for Black Bear sports, including most home football games and men's and women's basketball games (also carried on Portland CW affiliate WPXT); WABI's relationship with UMaine, which dated to the station's founding in 1953 (outside of a period from 1989 through 1997 in which rival WLBZ-TV held the rights) ended in 2013, after the station was unable to reach a renewal deal with Learfield Sports. In July 2013, Learfield reached a deal to make WVII-TV and WFVX-LD, Bangor's ABC and Fox affiliates, the new flagship television stations for the Black Bear Sports Network. As part of the deal, Black Bear sports telecasts will also be seen on Fox College Sports, and production will be handled by Pack Network (WABI had produced its telecasts in-house). Select basketball games are carried on ESPN Plus and America East TV and picked up by NESN or carried locally on other Bangor-based television stations.

In 2013 new 5-year deals were announced, Blueberry Broadcasting's WVOM-FM/WVOM/WVQM will be the flagship for men's ice hockey and football, Waterfront Communications' WGUY will be the flagship for basketball and baseball.

== Current radio affiliates ==
Station	Frequency	City	Format	Sports carried	Notes
WVOM-FM	103.9	Howland/Bangor	News/Talk	Ice Hockey (2007, 2013–) & Football (2007–08, 2013–)	
WVQM	101.3	Augusta	News/Talk	Ice Hockey (2013-) & Football (2013-)	
WLOB	1310	Portland	News/Talk	Football, Select Men's basketball	
WTOS	910	Bangor	Fox Sports Radio	Basketball (2011–2013) & Baseball (2012–2013), Overflow football and hockey (2014-)	Co-flagship with WAEI-FM from 2008 to 2011)
WGUY	1230	Veazie/Bangor	Oldies	Basketball, Baseball, Softball (2013-)	
WBAN	1340	Veazie/Bangor	News/Talk	Overflow basketball and baseball games (2013-)	
WHZP	1400	Veazie/Bangor	News/Talk	Overflow basketball and baseball games (2013-)	

== Past affiliates ==
Station	Frequency	City	Format	Sports carried	Notes
WBCQ-FM	94.7	Monticello	Classic Country	Hockey	Affiliated ended after 2012–2013 season
WGUY	102.1	Dexter	Oldies	Basketball (2007), Baseball/Softball (2008)	Later sold with sports moving to WAEI for 2008–2009 season
Fox Sports Maine	97.5/1450/1280	Madison/Rockland, Gardiner	Fox Sports Radio	Basketball, Baseball, Select hockey & football games. Affiliation ended at the end of the 2012–2013 academic year.	
WKSQ	94.5	Ellsworth	Hot AC	Football (2011–2012) & Hockey (2011–2013)	
WAEI-FM	97.1	Bangor	Sports Talk	Football (2009–2010), Hockey (2008–2011), Basketball (2008–2011), Baseball (2009–11)	Co-flagship with WAEI 910
WVOM	1450	Rockland/Bangor	News/Talk	Basketball (until 2012–13 season), Baseball (until 2013 season), Ice Hockey (2013–2022) & Football (2013–2022)	Carried University of Maine sports when it was part of trimulcast of Fox Sports Maine
