= WBAK =

Radio station in Belfast, Maine

WBAK and WBKA
Simulcasts of WABK-FM, Gardiner
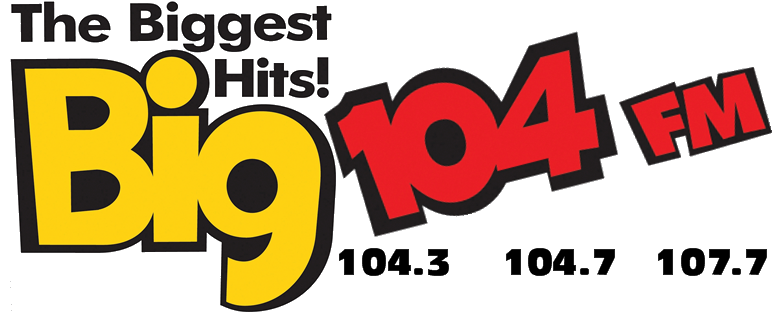

WBAK: Belfast, Maine; WBKA: Trenton, Maine; United States
- Broadcast area: WBAK: Mid Coast–Bangor, Maine; WBKA: Down East
- Frequencies: WBAK: 104.7 MHz; WBKA: 107.7 MHz
- Branding: Big 104 FM

Programming
- Format: Classic hits

Ownership
- Owner: Blueberry Broadcasting, LLC
- Sister stations: WBFB; WBFE; WKSQ; WTOS; WVOM-FM

History
- First air date: WBAK: March 7, 1986; WBKA: May 6, 1995
- Former call signs: WBAK: WWFX (1986–1997); WBFB (1997–2011); WAEI-FM (2011–2012); WBKA: WEJS (1993–1994); WMDI (1994–2001); WBQI (2001–2013)
- Call sign meaning: similar to WABK-FM (sister station in Gardiner)

Technical information
- Licensing authority: FCC
- Facility ID: WBAK: 25411; WBKA: 40925
- Class: WBAK: B; WBKA: A
- ERP: WBAK: 10,000 watts; WBKA: 3,400 watts
- HAAT: WBAK: 335 meters (1,099 ft); WBKA: 134 meters (440 ft)
- Transmitter coordinates: WBAK: 44°34′51.2″N 68°53′49.1″W; WBKA: 44°33′11.1″N 68°23′34.2″W

Links
- Public license information: WBAK: Public file; LMS; WBKA: Public file; LMS
- Webcast: Listen live
- Website: www.big104fm.com

WBAK (104.7 MHz "Big 104 FM") is a commercial FM radio station licensed to Belfast, Maine. It is owned by Blueberry Broadcasting, and broadcasts a classic hits radio format. Its programming is also simulcast on WBKA (107.7 FM) in Trenton, as well as WABK-FM 104.3 in Gardiner (serving Augusta).

Studios and offices are on Target Industrial Circle in Bangor. WBAK's transmitter is off Murray Lane in Frankfort. WBKA's transmitter is off Tunk Lake Road in Sullivan. WBAK's competitor is WBQX in Thomaston. WBKA's competitors are cross-town station WNSX in Winter Harbor and WWMJ in Ellsworth.

== History ==
=== WBAK ===
WBAK signed on the air on March 7, 1986, as WWFX. It was a contemporary hit radio station known as "The Fox" and was owned by Sunnie Silverman. Silverman sold the station to Bruce Mittman, owner of WICE in Pawtucket, Rhode Island, that December. WWFX was taken over in 1991 by Union Financial Services. The station was sold to Group H Radio on March 17, 1993.

Group H announced on September 18, 1996, that it would sell WWFX to Star Broadcasting, a company owned by Mark Osborne and Natalie Knox (current owners of WNSX) that already owned WKSQ and WLKE (now WBFE). To minimize playlist overlap with WKSQ, on September 20, Star changed the station's format to country music as "The Bear." The first song was "Gone Country" by Alan Jackson. The change gave rival WQCB its first competition since WYOU-FM became modern rock station WWBX a year earlier. The WWFX call letters were replaced with WBFB on April 25, 1997, after the station attempted to obtain the WEBR call sign.

Osborne and Knox sold WBFB, WKSQ, and WLKE to Communications Capital Managers in February 2000; that July, CCM announced that it would sell the group (which through other purchases also included WBYA, WGUY, and WVOM) to Clear Channel Communications. Clear Channel announced on November 16, 2006, that it would sell its Bangor stations after being bought by private equity firms, resulting in a sale to Blueberry Broadcasting to 2008; on September 28, 2009, Blueberry began simulcasting WBFB on WLKE and WMCM, replacing their separate country formats. The station swapped formats and call letters with 97.1 FM (the former WYOU-FM) on September 1, 2011, and became sports radio station WAEI-FM, simulcasting with WAEI (WLKE and WMCM continue to simulcast WBFB on its new frequency). The call letters were changed to WBAK on February 5, 2012; the next day, the format was changed to classic hits, leaving the sports format exclusively on WAEI's 910 AM frequency.

=== WBKA ===
WBKA went on the air from Bar Harbor May 6, 1995, as WMDI (for its location on Mount Desert Island), programming 1970s' music. Original owner MDI Communications sold the station to Bridge Broadcast Corporation in 1997; the new owners changed the station's format to adult album alternative. WMDI was simulcast on WNSX from that station's launch in July 2000 until February 2001, when WNSX was sold to Clear Channel Communications and began to simulcast WFZX. In January 2001, Bridge reached a seal to sell WMDI to Mariner Broadcasting; after the sale was completed in April 2001, the station temporarily left the air, returning on April 23 as WBQI, part of Mariner's WBACH network of classical music stations. Mariner sold its stations to Nassau Broadcasting Partners in 2004.

Nassau Broadcasting entered bankruptcy in 2011, which culminated in an auction of its stations. Prior to the conclusion of the auction, the Maine Public Broadcasting Network expressed interest in running the WBACH stations. As part of the bankruptcy proceeding, WBQI, along with 29 other Nassau-owned northern New England radio stations, went to a partnership of WBIN-TV owner Bill Binnie and Jeff Shapiro; 17 of the stations, including WBQI, were acquired by Binnie's WBIN Media Company. The purchase was consummated on November 30, 2012, at a price of $12.5 million. WBIN Media promptly announced plans to resell WBQI to Blueberry Broadcasting; on November 30, 2012, the station began to simulcast WBAK. On January 3, 2013, the station changed its call sign to WBKA.
