= WKSQ =

Radio station in Ellsworth, Maine

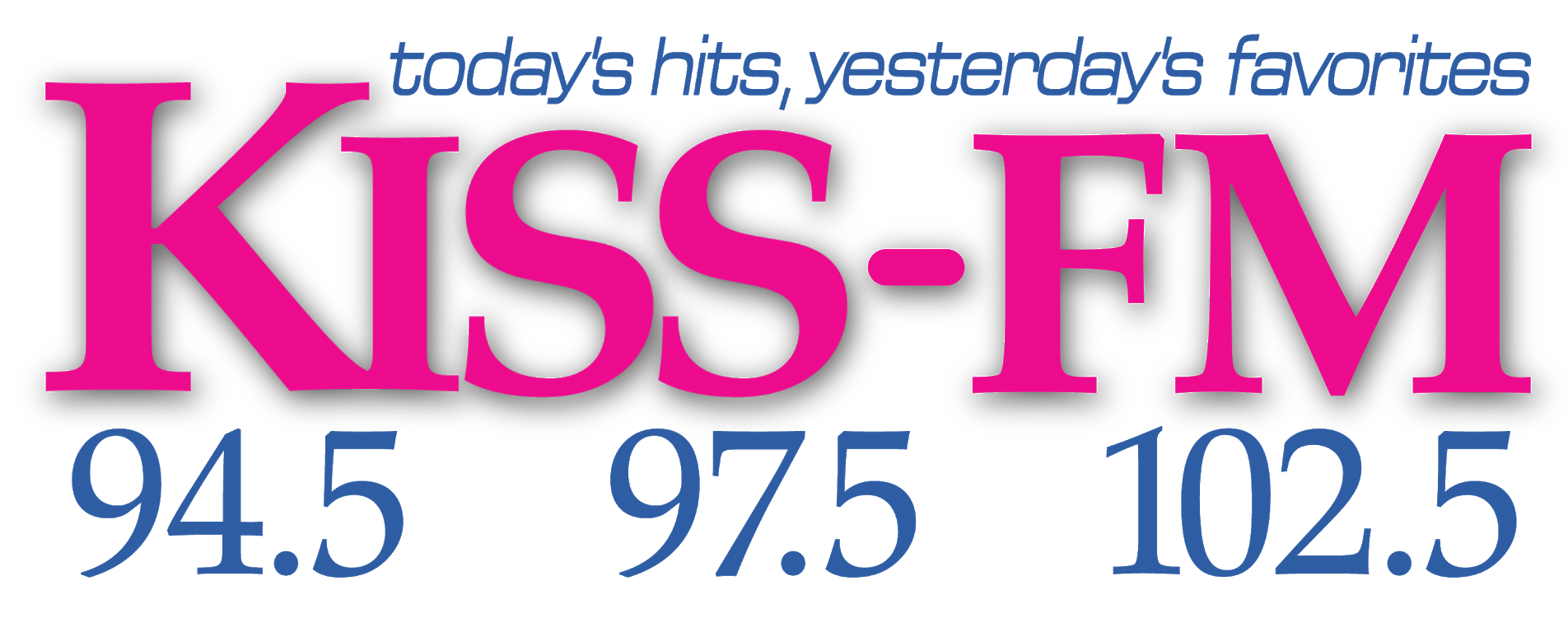
- Ellsworth, Maine; United States
- Broadcast area: Bangor; Down East
- Frequency: 94.5 MHz
- Branding: Kiss FM

Programming
- Format: Hot adult contemporary
- Affiliations: Westwood One

Ownership
- Owner: Blueberry Broadcasting; (Blueberry Broadcasting, LLC)
- Sister stations: WBAK; WBFB; WBFE; WBKA; WTOS; WTUX; WVOM-FM

History
- First air date: May 27, 1982
- Call sign meaning: "Kiss"

Technical information
- Licensing authority: FCC
- Facility ID: 341
- Class: B
- ERP: 11,500 watts
- HAAT: 313 meters (1,027 ft)
- Transmitter coordinates: 44°39′31.2″N 68°36′15.1″W
- Repeater: 102.5 WQSS (Camden)

Links
- Public license information: Public file; LMS
- Webcast: Listen live
- Website: www.kissfm.net

Simulcast
- WQSK
- Madison, Maine; United States
- Broadcast area: Skowhegan; Farmington
- Frequency: 97.5 MHz

Ownership
- Owner: Blueberry Broadcasting; (Blueberry Broadcasting, LLC)
- Sister stations: WABK-FM; WTOS-FM; WVQM

History
- First air date: November 29, 1989
- Former call signs: WHAA (1989–1995); WIGY (1995–2013)
- Call sign meaning: similar to WKSQ

Technical information
- Facility ID: 28684
- Class: A
- ERP: 6,000 watts
- HAAT: 100 meters (330 ft)
- Transmitter coordinates: 44°47′32.2″N 69°58′8.2″W

Links
- Public license information: Public file; LMS

WKSQ (94.5 MHz "Kiss-FM") is a commercial FM radio station licensed to Ellsworth, Maine, and serving the Bangor metropolitan area. The station broadcasts a hot adult contemporary radio format, switching to Christmas music for part of November and December. WKSQ is owned by Blueberry Broadcasting.

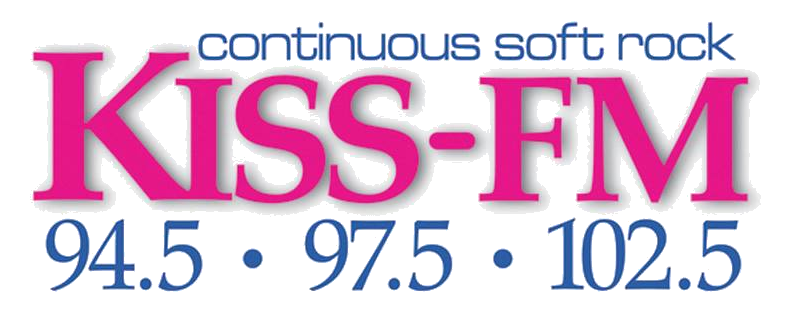
Former logo used from February 24, 2014, through August 31, 2018

Programming is simulcast in the Skowhegan / Farmington areas on WQSK (97.5 FM) in Madison, which was formerly part of Fox Sports Maine. In the Mid Coast area, WKSQ is simulcast on WQSS (102.5 FM) in Camden, which formerly offered its own adult contemporary format.

WKSQ used to carry Maine Black Bears sports, sharing flagship status of the Black Bear Sports Network with WAEI; football and men's hockey games were aired on the station. In morning drive time, WKSQ carries a syndicated program, Elvis Duran and the Morning Show. The station's previous morning show was Mike & Mike in the Morning (a local program featuring Mike Dow and Mike Elliot, unrelated to the similarly-named program on ESPN Radio); previous evening programing included Intelligence for Your Life with John Tesh.
