= WABK =

WABK may refer to:

- WABK-FM, a radio station (104.3 FM) licensed to Gardiner, Maine, United States
- WTOS (AM), a radio station (910 AM) licensed to Bangor, Maine, United States, which used the call sign WABK from 2016 through 2019
- WHTP (AM), a radio station (1280 AM) licensed to Gardiner, Maine, United States, which used the call sign WABK from 1968 through 1987 and 1988 through 1994
