= WMCM =

Country music radio station in Rockland, Maine

Simulcasts WBFB, Bangor
- Rockland, Maine; United States
- Broadcast area: Mid Coast
- Frequency: 103.3 MHz
- Branding: The Bear

Programming
- Format: Country
- Affiliations: Premiere Networks; Motor Racing Network

Ownership
- Owner: Blueberry Broadcasting; (Blueberry Broadcasting, LLC)
- Sister stations: WABK-FM; WVQM; WQSS; WTOS-FM

History
- First air date: 1968 (as WRKD-FM at 93.5)
- Former call signs: WRKD-FM (1968–1980)
- Former frequencies: 93.5 MHz (1968–1985)
- Call sign meaning: Mid Coast Maine

Technical information
- Licensing authority: FCC
- Facility ID: 57301
- Class: B
- ERP: 22,500 watts
- HAAT: 225 meters (738 ft)
- Transmitter coordinates: 44°7′36.9″N 69°8′26.3″W

Links
- Public license information: Public file; LMS
- Webcast: Listen live
- Website: www.971thebear.com

WMCM (103.3 FM) is an American radio station broadcasting a country music format simulcasting WBFB. Licensed to Rockland, Maine, United States, the station serves the Mid Coast Maine area. The station is owned by Blueberry Broadcasting.

== History ==
The station signed on in 1968 as a Class A on 93.5 as WRKD-FM, sister to WRKD (1450 AM, later WVOM). WMCM upgraded to 20.6 kW and changed its frequency to 103.3 in the late 1980s. The station began its country music format on September 9, 1990, replacing a short lived classical music format, and subsequently branded as "Real Country 103.3". As of September 28, 2009, WMCM became part of a three-station country network based out of Blueberry's Bangor office, simulcasting WBFB and also heard on WLKE (now WBFE, formerly branded as "Lucky 99.1").
