= WAEI =

WAEI may refer to:

- WTOS (AM), a radio station (910 AM) licensed to Bangor, Maine, United States, which used the call sign WAEI from 2009 through 2016
- WBAK, a radio station (104.7 FM) licensed to Belfast, Maine, United States, which used the call sign WAEI-FM from 2011 through 2012
- WBFB, a radio station (97.1 FM) licensed to Bangor, Maine, United States, which used the call sign WAEI-FM from 2008 through 2011
