= WTOS =

WTOS may refer to:

- WTOS (AM), a radio station (910 AM) licensed to Bangor, Maine, United States
- WTOS-FM, a radio station (105.1 FM) licensed to Skowhegan, Maine, United States
