= WHTP =

WHTP may refer to:

- WHTP (AM), a radio station (1280 AM) licensed to serve Gardiner, Maine, United States
- WHTP-FM, a radio station (104.7 FM) licensed to serve Kennebunkport, Maine
