= WABI =

WABI or wabi may refer to:

- Douw Aturure Airport (ICAO code WABI)
- Wabi (software), a product from Sun Microsystems that implements the Microsoft Windows API specifications
- Wabi, another name for the Huave people of Oaxaca
- WABI-TV, a television station licensed to Bangor, Maine, United States
- WTOS (AM), a radio station licensed to Bangor, Maine, United States, which held the call sign WABI from 1924 to 2009
- WBFB, a radio station licensed to Bangor, Maine, United States, which held the call sign WABI-FM from 1961 to 1973
- Wabi, a component of the Wabi-sabi Japanese aesthetic
- The Workshop on Algorithms in Bioinformatics
- Wabi Daněk (1947 - 2017), czech singer
- Wabi Ryvola (1935 - 1995), czech singer and writer
