= WJYE =

WJYE may refer to:

- WHTP (AM), a radio station (AM 1280) licensed to serve Gardiner, Maine, United States which held the call sign WJYE from 2014 to 2020
- WTSS, a radio station (96.1 FM) licensed to serve Buffalo, New York, United States which held the call sign WJYE from 1979 to 2014
