= WBAK (disambiguation) =

WBAK is a radio station in Belfast, Maine, United States.

WBAK may also refer to:

- WAWV-TV, a television station in Terre Haute, Indiana, United States, that held station callsign WBAK-TV from 1977 to 2005
- Anduki Airfield, an airfield in Seria, Brunei, ICAO code WBAK
