= WWNZ =

WWNZ may refer to:

- WNZE, a radio station (1400 AM) licensed to serve Clarksville, Tennessee, United States, which held the call sign WWNZ from 2019 to 2020
- WHZP, a radio station (1400 AM) licensed to seve Veazie, Maine, United States, which held the call sign WWNZ from 2001 to 2016
