= WLEK =

WLEK may refer to:

- WLEK-LD, a low-power television station (channel 31, virtual 22) licensed to serve Concord, New Hampshire, United States
- WTUX, a radio station (101.1 FM) licensed to serve Gouldsboro, Maine, United States, which held the call sign WLEK from 2009 to 2010
