= WCRQ =

Radio station in Dennysville, Maine

Coordinates: 45.029°N 67.323°W

- Dennysville, Maine; United States
- Broadcast area: Downeast Maine, Southern New Brunswick
- Frequency: 102.9 MHz
- Branding: Border Country 102.9

Programming
- Format: Country music

Ownership
- Owner: WQDY, Inc.
- Sister stations: WALZ, WQDY-FM

History
- First air date: May 1998
- Call sign meaning: W Calais Radio Quoddy

Technical information
- Licensing authority: FCC
- Facility ID: 6782
- Class: C1
- ERP: 51,000 watts
- HAAT: 139 meters (456 ft)

Links
- Public license information: Public file; LMS
- Website: www.wqdy.fm

WCRQ (102.9 MHz, Border Country 102.9) is a commercial FM radio station licensed to Dennysville, Maine. The station is owned by WQDY, Inc., which also owns 92.7 WQDY-FM Calais and 95.3 WALZ Machias. WCRQ airs a country music format.

The studios and offices are at 637 Main Street in Calais. The transmitter is on Conant Hill Road in Charlotte. Because its signal spans both the U.S. and Canada, WCRQ calls itself "The Border." The call sign stands for Calais Radio Quoddy, with the Q representing Quoddy Head State Park, a local attraction. Under proper weather conditions, the station's signal can reach as far east as Saint John, New Brunswick, as far south as Yarmouth, Nova Scotia, as far north as Fredericton, New Brunswick, and as far west as Bangor, Maine.

== History ==
Former logo of the station, used between 2003 and 2019.

WCRQ signed on the air as a contemporary hit radio station in May 1998. It was first owned by Pilot Communications with studios at 115 Main Street in Calais, then later Citadel Broadcasting. The call letters WCRQ were previously used by FM stations in Arab, Alabama, and Providence, Rhode Island. In 2003, WQDY-FM acquired WCRQ and the station became a part of the WQDY, Inc. family of stations.

On July 1, 2019, WCRQ changed its format from contemporary hit radio to country as "Border Country 102.9".

== Signal strength ==
WCRQ broadcasts at 51,000 watts. WBLM, a classic rock station in Portland, Maine, broadcasts on the same frequency. WBLM's signal reaches as far east as Acadia National Park. In areas like Bar Harbor and Ellsworth, WBLM interferes with WCRQ. This is because WBLM broadcasts at 100,000 watts from one of Maine's tallest TV - radio towers.

== See also ==
- WQDY-FM
- List of radio stations in Maine
