= Anne Hallward =

American psychiatrist and public radio show host

Anne Hallward is an American psychiatrist and Assistant Clinical Professor at Tufts University Medical School, supervising psychiatry residents at Maine Medical Center. Hallward created Safe Space Radio for which she has received numerous awards.

== Biography ==
Hallward was raised in Montreal, Canada as one of six children. She went to college at Harvard, where she wrote her thesis in social studies about the role of the Catholic Church in the People Power revolution in the Philippines. She then attended Harvard Medical School and completed her residency in psychiatry. Anne lives with her husband and son on an old farm in Maine. Together they raised sheep, turkeys and chickens for 8 years.

== Career ==
While on the faculty at Harvard Medical School, she co-designed and taught courses on death and dying, cultural humility, sexuality, and psychiatric interviewing.

Hallward created an advocacy group called Hearing Aides to allow women to talk about their trauma before meeting their lawyer, but the group stopped offering services in 2018, following the travel ban by the Trump administration. In 2014, Hallward presented a Tedx in Brunswick Maine.

Hallward has hosted public events aimed at raising awareness of mental health and opening safe spaces to speak about and address mental illness. Hallward was interviewed on NPR's Here & Now program in 2023 about her experiences counseling Afghan and Bangladesh woman attending universities built for women in countries who restrict access to female education.

=== Safe Space Radio ===
In 2008, Hallward founded Safe Space Radio, self described as "the show about the subjects we would struggle with less if we could talk about them more". It was broadcast on WMPG in Portland before being broadcast nationally on NPR stations.

The show won a Public Affairs Award from the Maine Association of Broadcasters in both 2013 and 2014.

In 2020, the show began releasing episodes to address mental health during the COVID-19 pandemic. The show ended in June 2023 after broadcasting over 300 shows.

=== Awards ===
- Gracie Award for Outstanding Host of a Local Public Radio Show, The National Alliance for Women in Media in 2017
- Jeanne Spurlock Social Justice Award from the National Association of Women Psychiatrists in 2016
- Ulrich B. Jacobsohn Lifetime Achievement Award from the Maine Association of Psychiatrists in 2016
- Exemplary Psychiatrist Award from the National Alliance on Mental Illness in 2013
- Fellowship Award by The Rockefeller Foundation (Bellagio, Italy) in 2024

== Works ==
- Ferris, Timothy G.G.; Hallward, Anne; Ronan, Larry; Billings, J. Andrew (September 1, 1998). "When the Patient Dies: A Survey of Medical Housestaff about Care after Death". Journal of Palliative Medicine. 1 (3): 231–239. doi:10.1089/jpm.1998.1.231. PMID 15859833.
- Hallward, Anne; Ellison, James M. (2001). Antidepressants and Sexual Function. London: Harcourt Health Communications.
- White, Augustus A; Logghe, Heather J.; Goodenough, Dan A.; Barnes, Linda L.; Hallward, Anne; Allen, Irving M.; Green, David W.; Krupat, Edward; Llerena-Quinn, Roxana (February 2018). "Self-Awareness and Cultural Identity as an Effort to Reduce Bias in Medicine". Journal of Racial and Ethnic Health Disparities. 5 (1): 34–49. doi:10.1007/s40615-017-0340-6. PMID 28342029. S2CID 207502004.
- Powers, Sara; Craig, Wendy; Kohut, Michael; Hallward, Anne (June 2023). "Narrative Podcasts to Foster Empathy and Reduce Stigma Among Third-Year Medical Students". Academic Psychiatry. 47 (3): 287–291. doi:10.1007/s40596-023-01764-y. PMC 10014135. PMID 36918469.
