= WKCG =

WKCG may refer to:

- WKCG-LP, a low-power radio station (99.1 FM) licensed to serve Dothan, Alabama, United States
- WVQM, a radio station (101.3 FM) licensed to serve Augusta, Maine, United States, which held the call sign WKCG from 1982 to 2009
