= WUMF =

Radio station in Farmington, Maine

- Farmington, Maine; United States
- Broadcast area: Farmington, Maine
- Frequency: 91.5 MHz
- Branding: 91.5 WUMF

Programming
- Format: college

Ownership
- Owner: University of Maine System; (University of Maine at Farmington)
- Sister stations: WUPI, WMEB-FM, WMPG, WUMM

History
- First air date: 1972
- Call sign meaning: University of Maine Farmington

Technical information
- Licensing authority: FCC
- Facility ID: 174338
- Class: A
- ERP: 100 watts
- HAAT: -66 meters
- Transmitter coordinates: 44°40′0.9″N 70°08′48.5″W

Links
- Public license information: Public file; LMS
- Webcast: Listen live

WUMF (91.5 FM) is student-run college radio station licensed to the University of Maine at Farmington in Farmington, Maine broadcasting on 91.5 FM. The station reports music played to North American College and Community Radio Chart (NACC). The station broadcasts a variety of music genres with a focus on new indie. It also airs various talk shows.

== History ==
The first WUMF license was obtained in 1972. WUMF-FM initially broadcast on 91.9 MHz, but as a grandfathered Class D station, it was limited in its broadcast power and could be bumped around the dial to allow other facilities to be improved. It relocated to 92.3 in 1981, 100.5 in 1985, and 100.1 in 2002, each time being moved to allow upgrades for other stations (such as WMME-FM).

The University of Maine System applied for a new Class A license on 91.5 MHz in late 2007. In September 2010, the WUMF call letters moved from the 100.1 license to the new 91.5 facility, which came on air for the first time. On the new license, WUMF began broadcasting with 100 watts as opposed to the previous 13. (The 100.1 frequency was designated WUMK before being turned in to the FCC.)

The station was temporarily closed at the end of 2019, and ran on automation until an effort to revitalize it began in 2021. WUMF celebrated its 50th anniversary on air in November 2022.

== Programs ==
WUMF's goal is to bring new, unheard music to the students of the University of Maine at Farmington, and is constantly updating its rotation. It has a strong indie, alternative, and alt-punk sound, although it carries a wide variety of genres for the listening masses. WUMF has approximately 50 DJs, pending the semester, and executive board positions consisting of Station Manager, Technical Director, Secretary, Local Music Liaison, Historian, Publicist, and Event Coordinators. It has a reputation for pushing the limits and making students think.

== See also ==
- Campus radio
- List of college radio stations in the United States
