= WUPI =

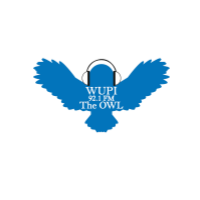
- Presque Isle, Maine; United States
- Broadcast area: Aroostook County, Maine
- Frequency: 91.1 MHz
- Branding: The Owl

Programming
- Format: Top 40 Hit Radio

Ownership
- Owner: University of Maine System
- Sister stations: WMEB-FM, WMPG, WUMF, WUMM

History
- First air date: July 26,1973
- Former frequencies: 91.1 MHz (1973–1978); 90.3 MHz (1978–1983); 92.1 MHz (1983-2024)
- Call sign meaning: University of Maine at Presque Isle

Technical information
- Facility ID: 69317
- Class: A
- ERP: 500 watts
- HAAT: −12.0 meters (−39.4 ft)
- Transmitter coordinates: 46°40′15″N 68°1′0″W

Links
- Webcast: Listen live
- Website: WUPI Online

WUPI (91.1 FM; "The Owl") is a student-run radio station licensed to Presque Isle, Maine. Owned by the University of Maine at Presque Isle, the station has an ERP of 500 watts. It airs a Top 40 hits format.

== History ==
WUPI was licensed July 26, 1973, broadcasting at 91.1 MHz with 10 watts of power. WUPI changed frequencies in April 1978 moving to 90.3 MHz, and finally went to 92.1 MHz in 1983, which included an upgrade to 17 watts. In July 2006, the station relocated from its previous location in the basement of Normal Hall to a new home at the center of the university campus. WUPI's antenna is currently located on top of Emerson Hall.

In December 2009, the station moved once again to a larger facility in Normal Hall, in order to combine student media resources for the University. After playing a hybrid of Adult Contemporary and Top 40 for about 10 months in 2010, the station switched to a Contemporary Hit Radio (CHR) format. A few months later, a computerized automation system was installed, and online streaming capabilities were added.

In 2016, with the closure of Normal Hall, the station began broadcasting its current location in Folsom/Pullen, one of the university's classroom buildings. Two years later, WUPI changed its slogan from "Presque Isle's New #1 Hit Music Station" to "UMPI & Presque Isle's #1 Hit Music Station". The next year, 2019, WUPI introduced a new logo created by the university's Marketing Club.

=== Power increase ===
On August 28, 2024, WUPI returned to its original frequency, 91.1 FM, in conjunction with a power increase to 500 watts ending 50 years as a low power station. As a result of the increase, the station can now be received as far as 15 miles from the campus, though reception in its fringe coverage area depends on the terrain.

== See also ==
- Campus radio
- List of college radio stations in the United States
