= WWPC =

Christian radio station in New Durham, New Hampshire

- New Durham, New Hampshire; United States
- Frequency: 91.7 MHz
- Branding: Word Radio Life

Programming
- Format: Christian
- Affiliations: Moody Broadcasting Network

Ownership
- Owner: Word Radio Educational Foundation
- Sister stations: WMEK, WRKJ, WSEW

History
- First air date: 1993
- Call sign meaning: "Where We Proclaim Christ"

Technical information
- Licensing authority: FCC
- Facility ID: 43801
- Class: A
- ERP: 150 watts
- HAAT: 152 meters (499 ft)
- Transmitter coordinates: 43°24′1.2″N 71°9′25.2″W

Links
- Public license information: Public file; LMS
- Website: www.wordradio.net/wrkj-and-wwpc/

WWPC (91.7 FM) is a non-commercial educational radio station licensed to serve New Durham, New Hampshire, United States. The station is owned by Word Radio Educational Foundation. WWPC broadcasts a Christian radio format as a simulcast of WRKJ (88.5 FM) in Westbrook, Maine.

== History ==
This station received its original construction permit from the Federal Communications Commission on August 9, 1991. The new station was assigned the WWPC call sign by the FCC on August 23, 1991.

WWPC filed an application for its license to cover from the FCC on January 5, 1993. The FCC accepted the application for filing, but did not issue the station its broadcast license until February 12, 2016.
