= WHCF =

Bangor, Maine; United States
- Broadcast area: Maine Highlands and Down East
- Frequency: 88.5 MHz

Programming
- Format: Christian radio

Ownership
- Owner: Lighthouse Radio Network, Inc.
- Sister stations: WHMX

History
- First air date: August 10, 1981
- Call sign meaning: "Where He Comes First"

Technical information
- Licensing authority: FCC
- Facility ID: 3665
- Class: C
- ERP: 35,000 watts
- HAAT: 494 meters (1,621 ft)
- Transmitter coordinates: 45.130°N 68.357°W
- Translators: 102.7 W274AF (Presque Isle); 93.7 W229AT (Hodgdon); 101.9 W270BD (Calais)

Links
- Public license information: Public file; LMS
- Webcast: Listen live
- Website: www.whcffm.com

WHCF (88.5 FM) is a non-commercial FM radio station broadcasting a Christian radio music. WHCF has studios on Outer Broadway in Bangor and is owned by Lighthouse Radio Network, Inc. WHCF's sister station is 105.7 WHMX. Licensed to Bangor, WHCF serves Northern Maine and Downeast Maine.

WHCF is a Class C station. It has an effective radiated power (ERP) of 35,000 watts. Its transmitter is about 30 miles (48 km) northeast of Bangor, in Burlington, Maine. WHCF is also heard on several FM translators around Northern Maine.

== Programming ==
In morning and afternoon drive time, WHCF airs Christian adult contemporary music with local DJs. In middays, evenings and early mornings, the station airs Christian talk and teaching shows.

National religious leaders heard on WHCF include Jim Daly, James Dobson, Chuck Swindoll, June Hunt, David Jeremiah, Greg Laurie, Alistair Begg, Nancy DeMoss Wolgemuth, John MacArthur and J. Vernon McGee.

== History ==
WHCF signed on the air on August 10, 1981. WHCF was the first full-time Christian radio station in Maine.

The station originally played a mix of southern gospel and inspirational music, mixed with 30-minute talk and teaching programs. In June 1989, the management of WHCF was able to add a sister station. WHMX broadcasts at 105.7 MHz and specializes in a more youthful Contemporary Christian music sound.

== Translators ==
WHCF is heard on several FM translators:

Call sign	Frequency	City of license	FID	ERP (W)	HAAT	Class	Transmitter coordinates	FCC info
W274AF	102.7 FM	Presque Isle, Maine	76345	4	173 m (568 ft)	D	46°36′11.1″N 68°0′24.1″W	LMS
W229AT	93.7 FM	Hodgdon, Maine	139333	13	95.7 m (314 ft)	D	46°2′21.1″N 67°50′26″W	LMS
W270BD	101.9 FM	Calais, Maine	139334	19	80.1 m (263 ft)	D	45°10′23.3″N 67°16′36″W	LMS
