= WHMX =

- Lincoln, Maine; United States
- Broadcast area: Penobscot County - Downeast Maine
- Frequency: 105.7 MHz

Programming
- Format: Contemporary Christian

Ownership
- Owner: Lighthouse Radio Network, Inc.
- Sister stations: WHCF

History
- First air date: April 1, 1975
- Former call signs: WLKN-FM (1975–1987); WGUY (1987–1989)
- Former frequencies: 99.3 MHz (1975–1991)
- Call sign meaning: Hot Mix (refers to former Hot AC format)

Technical information
- Licensing authority: FCC
- Facility ID: 49690
- Class: C2
- ERP: 48,000 watts
- HAAT: 142 meters (466 ft)
- Transmitter coordinates: 45°20′38″N 68°30′24″W

Links
- Public license information: Public file; LMS
- Website: www.solutionfm.com

WHMX (105.7 FM) is a non-commercial radio station licensed to Lincoln, Maine, United States, serving Penobscot County and Downeast Maine. Owned by Lighthouse Radio Network, Inc., the station features a Contemporary Christian format. Studios are located on Outer Broadway in Bangor and the transmitter is in Burlington, Maine, about 30 miles (48 km) northeast of Bangor.

== History ==
=== WLKN-FM and WGUY-FM ===
The station signed on the air on April 1, 1975. Its original call sign was WLKN-FM, standing for its city of license, Lincoln, Maine. It was the sister station of WLKN 1450 AM (now silent). WLKN-FM's frequency was 99.3 and it was only powered at 1,750 watts, a fraction of its current output. WLKN-AM-FM simulcast most of their programming. They had a full service, adult contemporary and country music format. They were also affiliates of the ABC Information Network. Because WLKN-FM was on a Class A frequency, it was limited to only serving Lincoln and surrounding communities.

On September 3, 1987, the station changed its call sign to WGUY-FM, and on June 8, 1989, it became the current WHMX.

=== Move to 105.7 MHz ===
The station got permission from the Federal Communications Commission (FCC) to move to a better frequency. It relocated to 105.7 in 1991. That allowed it to become a Class C station, with a taller tower and increased power. With its new strength, it began serving the larger, more lucrative Bangor radio market.

For much of the 1990s, WHMX was known as Hot Mix 106. It was a commercial radio station airing a hot adult contemporary format.

=== Christian Radio ===
In 1997, the station was bought by the Bangor Baptist Church. It was paired with 88.5 WHCF, which the church also owned. WHMX began airing Contemporary Christian music. In May 2005, the station changed slogans from 105-7 The X to Solution FM.

Over time, the church decided it was best if a professional non-profit organization owned and operated the two full-power radio stations, along with rebroadcasters and translators, around Northern Maine. On September 28, 2012, WHMX and WHCF, along with translators W274AF, W221BO, W227BE, W229AT, and W270BD, were sold. The Lighthouse Radio Network took over control. The deal was consummated at a price of $100.

== Translator stations ==
The station is heard on several FM translators:

Station	Frequency	City	Power
W227BE	93.3	Orono	27 watts
W270BD	101.9	Calais	19 watts
W221BO	92.1	Ellsworth	10 watts
