= Maine Black Bears =

Athletic teams that represent the University of Maine

- University: University of Maine
- Nickname: Black Bears
- NCAA: Division I (FCS)
- Conference: America East (primary); CAA (football); Hockey East
- Athletic director: Jude Killy
- Location: Orono, Maine
- Varsity teams: 17 teams (8 men, 9 women)
- Football stadium: Alfond Stadium
- Basketball arena: Memorial Gym
- Ice hockey arena: Alfond Arena
- Colors: Maine blue, white, and navy
- Mascot: Bananas T. Bear
- Fight song: The Maine Stein Song and For Maine
- Website: goblackbears.com
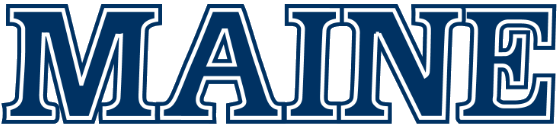

The Maine Black Bears are the athletic teams that represent the University of Maine. A member of the America East Conference, the University of Maine sponsors teams in eight men's and nine women's NCAA sanctioned sports. The men's and women's ice hockey teams are members of Hockey East, and the football team is an associate member of the Coastal Athletic Association.

== Sports sponsored ==
Men's sports	Women's sports
Baseball	Basketball
Basketball	Cross country
Cross country	Field hockey
Football	Ice hockey
Ice hockey	Soccer
Swimming and diving	Softball
Track and field^{†}	Swimming and diving
	Track and field^{†}
† – Track and field includes both indoor and outdoor.

=== Baseball ===
The baseball program has made several trips to the College World Series and has produced numerous major- league baseball players. The program has also made 16 NCAA tournament appearances, most recently in 2011 when they defeated FIU, 4-1, in the NCAA regionals. The program has won the AEC Tournament five times, in 1993, 2002, 2005, 2006, and 2011. The program also won the conference in 1990 and 1991, before the America East sponsored a baseball tournament.

=== Basketball ===
The basketball teams, as well as all other sports teams, participate in the America East Conference. Former Clemson University head baseball coach Jack Leggett also attended the university, as well as NBA head coach Rick Carlisle (although Carlisle transferred to Virginia and finished his college career there). Other notables include Rufus Harris, Kevin Reed, Matt Rossignol, Jim Boylen, Andy Bedard, and several former Maine high school stars including Bangor's Jon McAllian and Edward Little's Troy Barnies. A prominent current player is San Diego-native Gerald Mclemore. The women's and men's basketball teams play at the Cross Insurance Center in Bangor starting with the 2013-14 season. The men's team has held a total of eight games at Memorial Gym since 2003–04. The team has never played in the NCAA Division I men's basketball tournament.

Cindy Blodgett played basketball at Maine before playing in the WNBA. She went on to serve as an assistant coach at Boston College and Brown.

The men's basketball team in recent years has made progress as in the 2009–10 season the team finished the season in second place in the America East conference with a 19–11 overall record with recording one of its biggest wins in recent years with a 52–51 win over Boston College of the Atlantic Coast Conference and in the 2010–11 season defeating the University of Massachusetts, 68-56, and Penn State, 74-64.

On May 23, 2007, Blodgett was named the head coach of the women's team. She was released in March 2011.

The Black Bears' rivalry with the New Hampshire Wildcats is the longest continuous basketball rivalry between any two non-Ivy League schools: the men's teams have played each other 120 seasons in a row, from 1904–1905 to the present season (2024-2025).

The program has developed 2 NBA players those being former Los Angeles Clippers Jeff Cross and former Boston Celtics and current head coach of the Dallas Mavericks Rick Carlisle.

=== Football ===
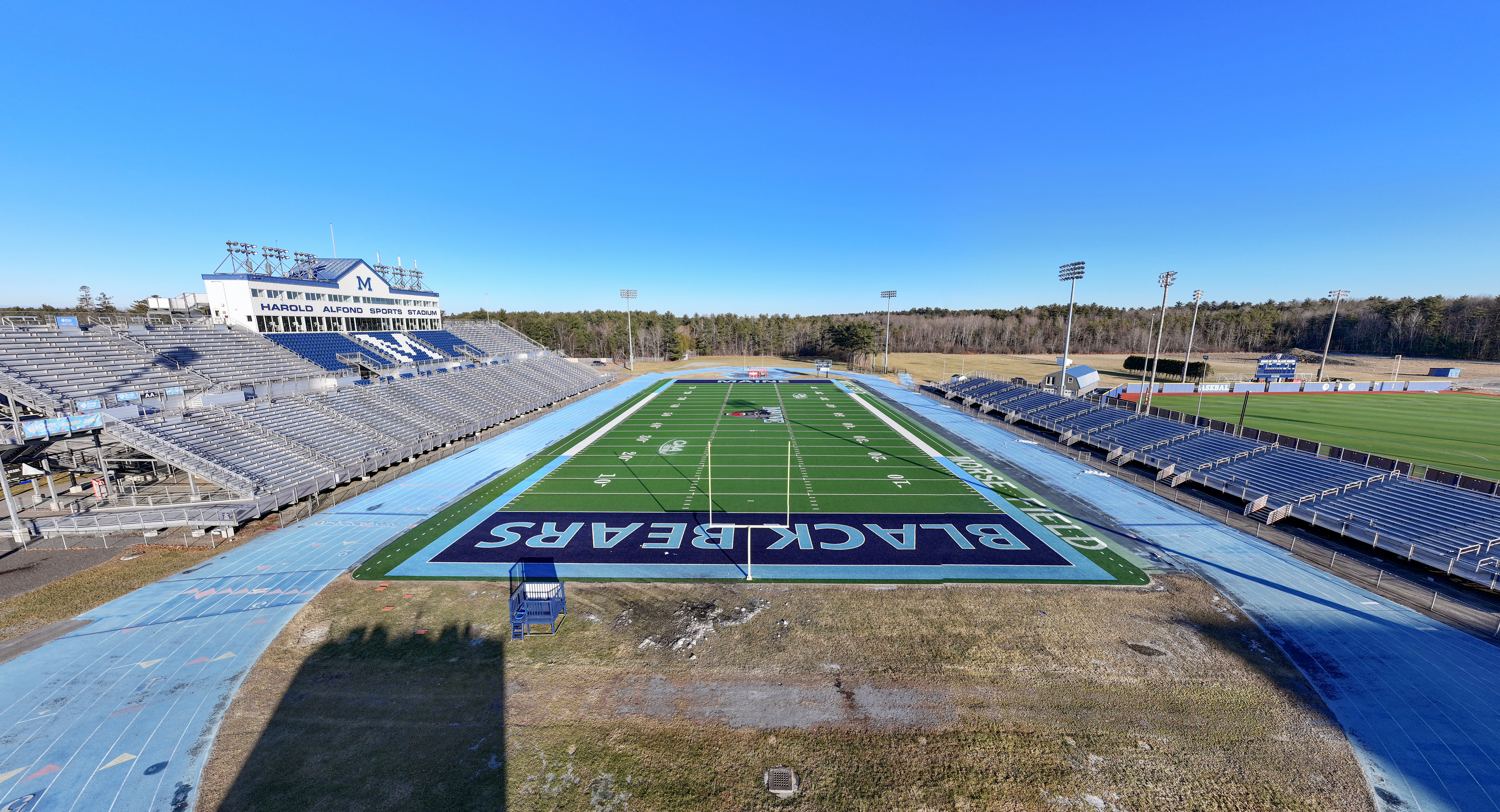
Harold Alfond Sports Stadium, football venue

Maine's football team competes in the Coastal Athletic Association. Prior to the 2007 season, the NCAA football league was sponsored by the Atlantic 10 Conference. The football program has produced many professional football players and coaches, such as center Mike Flynn, offensive lineman Justin Strzelczyk, quarterback Mike Buck, wide receiver/coach Phil McGeoghan, Pro Bowl linebacker Lofa Tatupu, who transferred to USC after his freshman year, linebacker Stephen Cooper, Pro Bowl fullback/special teams Montell Owens, defensive back Daren Stone, tight end Matthew Mulligan, defensive lineman Mike DeVito, linebacker Jovan Belcher, Pro Bowl fullback/defensive lineman Patrick Ricard, and defensive back Brandon McGowan. Current Iowa coach, and 2002 AP National Coach of the Year Kirk Ferentz began his head coaching career at Maine. In the 2006 NFL draft, the Oakland Raiders selected wide receiver Kevin McMahan as the draft's last selection, affectionately known as Mr. Irrelevant. Among Division I FCS-level college programs, Maine currently has the most active players on National Football League rosters as of 2025.

The team has played several Football Bowl Subdivision (FBS) opponents. In recent years, the team has played Iowa, Rutgers, Hawaii, Mississippi State, Nebraska, Connecticut, Syracuse, and Pittsburgh. In 2004, The Maine Black Bears defeated Mississippi State University, 9-7. This marked the first time that Maine defeated a Division I FBS opponent. The largest crowd that the Black Bears have ever played in front of was 77,469 fans at Memorial Stadium, when Maine fell, 25–7, to Nebraska in Lincoln, Nebraska. The team is scheduled to play BCS games at the ACC's Boston College in 2012 and the Big Ten's Northwestern University in 2013. UM also defeated longtime rival and FBS opponent Massachusetts, 24-14, in 2013. Despite success over the past decade, including an NCAA tournament berth in 2011, Maine had never won a CAA regular season title. That drought ended on November 16, 2013 as Maine defeated the University of Rhode Island 41-0 at home to win their first CAA title.

=== Ice hockey ===
The men's ice hockey program was introduced in 1977. The team has been successful and have won the Hockey East title five times, appeared in eleven Frozen Fours, and won 2 National Championships. The Black Bears compete in the Hockey East conference, which includes teams such as Boston College, Boston University, Northeastern, and New Hampshire. The program has produced many professional ice hockey players, such as Paul Kariya, Eric Weinrich, Keith Carney, Garth Snow, Mike Dunham, Dustin Penner, and Jimmy Howard. The team is best known for its 1992–93 season, in which the team only lost one game, finishing with a record of 42–1–2. The team is noted for its head coach Shawn Walsh, who coached the team for seventeen seasons. Walsh is credited with turning the team into such a successful program, as well as turning the Alfond Arena into one of the most intimidating arenas in college hockey. Walsh died of renal cell carcinoma on September 26, 2001.

== Media ==
=== Radio and television ===
Currently the flagship for all football and hockey games, as well as their respective coaches shows are carried on the Voice of Maine News/Talk Network (WVOM-FM and WVQM; the current flagship for all men's and women's basketball games as well as baseball and select softball games is WGUY. All games are carried on GoBlackBears.com. TV coverage includes Bangor's WVII-TV, with games simulcast on Fox College Sports. NESN, CBS Sports Network, and NBCSN Comcast SportsNet New England also carry select games as part of a larger contract with the conferences the sports are in. During the school year the Black Bear Insider is carried Sunday mornings on WVII at noon, and rebroadcast on Fox College Sports as well.

In 2006 the university sold the multimedia advertising and broadcast rights to all athletic events to Missouri-based Learfield Sports. Starting with the fall 2007 sports season, WVOM and WGUY split radio coverage, WGUY carrying men's and women's basketball and select baseball and softball games and WVOM carrying football and hockey broadcasts. After the 2008 fall sports season, WAEI-FM became the flagship for all Maine sports; the rights were transferred again to WKSQ in 2011 (though WAEI's AM sister station remained a co-flagship), before coming back full circle locally to WVOM (Blueberry) and WGUY (WaterFront) in 2013.

Many Black Bear games can also be heard on WMEB-FM, a student-run, commercial-free radio station located on campus.

== Championships ==
=== Men's Ice Hockey ===
America East Conference logo

National Champions	1993, 1999
Hockey East Champions	1989, 1992, 1993, 2000, 2004, 2025

=== Men's Cross Country ===
National Champions	1915
America East Champions	2004
Yankee Conference Champions	1950, 1954, 1955, 1957, 1959, 1963
New England Champions	1913, 1914, 1921, 1922, 1927, 1928, 1934, 1935, 1938, 1939, 1955, 1956, 1957, 1959

=== Baseball ===
CWS appearances	1964, 1976, 1981, 1982, 1983, 1984, 1986
America East Champions	1990, 1991, 1993, 2002, 2005, 2006, 2011, 2024, 2025

=== Softball ===
America East Champions	2004, 2016

Football
Yankee Conference – 1949, 1951, 1952, 1961, 1965, 1974, 1982,1989, 2000, 2009 Atlantic 10 – 2001, 2002
Coastal Athletic Association - 2013, 2018

Riflery
Yankee Conference – 1959, 1960, 1961, 1965, 1966

Women's Basketball
America East – 1990, 1991, 1995, 1996, 1997, 1998, 2004, 2018, 2019

Women’s Cross Country America East—2025

Men's Indoor Track
Yankee Conference – 1964

Men's Outdoor Track
America East – 1995
Yankee Conference – 1961, 1962, 1963, 1964, 1965
New England – 1927, 1928, 1929, 1930

Women's Outdoor Track
New England – 2003
