= WTOS (AM) =

Radio station in Bangor, Maine

Simulcasting WTOS-FM Skowhegan
- Bangor, Maine; United States
- Broadcast area: Bangor
- Frequency: 910 kHz
- Branding: 105 & 101 TOS

Programming
- Format: Mainstream rock

Ownership
- Owner: Blueberry Broadcasting, LLC
- Sister stations: WBAK; WBFB; WBFE; WKSQ; WVOM-FM

History
- First air date: January 1924
- Former call signs: WABI (1923–2009); WAEI (2009–2016); WABK (2016–2019)
- Call sign meaning: Top of Sugarloaf (transmitter location for WTOS-FM)

Technical information
- Licensing authority: FCC
- Facility ID: 3670
- Class: B
- Power: 5,000 watts day; 210 watts night
- Transmitter coordinates: 44°46′51.26″N 68°44′50.13″W
- Translator: 105.3 W287DM (Bangor)

Links
- Public license information: Public file; LMS
- Webcast: Listen live
- Website: www.wtosfm.com

WTOS (910 kHz) is a commercial AM radio station licensed to Bangor, Maine, United States. The station is owned by Blueberry Broadcasting. WTOS broadcasts a mainstream rock format, simulcast with WTOS-FM 105.1 in Skowhegan and WTUX (101.1 FM) in Gouldsboro.

WTOS's studios and offices are on Target Industrial Circle in Bangor. The transmitter is off Wilson Street in Brewer. The station broadcasts at 5,000 watts during the day. To protect other radio stations on AM 910 at night, it reduces power to 210 watts. WTOS uses a non-directional antenna at all times.

== History ==
=== Early years ===
The station was first licensed in May 1923 on 1250 kHz, to the Bangor Railway & Electric Company. The original call letters, WABI, were randomly assigned from a sequential roster of available call letters.

It is Maine's oldest radio station still on the air today. Several other stations, including WMB in Auburn and WPAY in Bangor, were licensed prior to WABI but have since ceased operations, with WMB being deleted two months before WABI's licensing.

Initially the station had a very limited schedule, with a first reported broadcast on January 13, 1924, of the Sunday service of the First Universalist Church. Starting on the evening of November 19, 1924, WABI began weekly Wednesday night broadcasts, and was reported to be "the first radio station in Maine to broadcast a regular program".

The station was briefly deleted in September 1925, but then relicensed on October 14, 1925, again as WABI on 1250 kHz, to the First Universalist Church. Under the First Universalist Church, WABI only broadcast on Sundays. In 1927, the newly formed Federal Radio Commission (FRC) assigned WABI to 770 kHz, which was changed to 1200 kHz on November 11, 1928, under the provisions of the FRC's General Order 40.

By 1930, the station was owned by Pine Tree Broadcasting Corporation. In 1932, it was again transferred to the First Universalist Society. The station was owned by Community Broadcasting Service by 1935.

=== CBS Radio ===
In 1939, WABI became Bangor's affiliate of the CBS Radio Network, replacing WLBZ (620 AM, now WZON), which affiliated with the NBC Red Network. WABI carried CBS's schedule of dramas, comedies, news, sports, soap operas, game shows and big band broadcasts during the "Golden Age of Radio". During the early 1940s, WABI again changed frequencies; the North American Regional Broadcasting Agreement moved the station to 1230 kHz in 1941. In 1942, it began broadcasting at its current frequency of 910 kHz.

Originally, Community Broadcasting Service was controlled by Frederick B. Simpson. However, in 1949, health problems forced him to retire and sell WABI to a partnership between former Maine governor Horace A. Hildreth and Murray Carpenter. By then, the station had joined ABC. It swapped affiliations with WGUY (1450 AM, now off the air). Hildreth became the sole owner in 1953, when Carpenter sold his stake in WABI and bought WGUY. That year, WABI-TV was launched.

=== 1960s and 1970s ===
On March 15, 1961, an FM sister station was put on the air at 97.1 MHz. Initially, WABI-FM (now WBFB) simulcast much of the AM station's programming. Around this time, the ABC affiliation was dropped in favor of the Mutual Broadcasting System. WABI had already carried some Mutual programming for a decade, in addition to ABC. It returned to ABC in 1964.

Community Broadcasting Service merged with Journal Publications in 1971 to form Diversified Communications. The company's broadcasting division retained the Community Broadcasting Service name until 1982, when WABI was transferred to Diversified directly. The station had a contemporary hits format by 1973, when WABI-FM broke away from the simulcast and became WBGW, a country music station. Over time, the station shifted from contemporary hits to a full service middle of the road format.

=== Adult standards ===
Diversified announced in 1993 that it would put most of its broadcasting properties, including WABI and what had become WYOU-FM, up for sale. While it would retain WABI-TV following the collapse of a deal to sell it to Vision Communications, the radio stations were sold to Bangor Radio Corporation.

Bangor Radio switched WABI to an adult standards format. The station affiliated with Transtar Radio Networks, carrying its AM Only service, airing a mix of standards and soft oldies, with news from CNN's radio network. A year later, WABI and its FM station, now called WWBX, were sold to Gopher Hill Broadcasting.

=== Clear Channel ownership ===
Clear Channel Communications signed a local marketing agreement (LMA) with Gopher Hill in early 2001. A few weeks later, it bought WABI and WWBX.

In 2005, Clear Channel switched WABI to a talk radio format, complementing its other talk station, WVOM (103.9 FM). During this time, programs included a simulcast of WVOM's morning show, Maine in the Morning, hosted by longtime WABI personality George Hale, as well as Dr. Joy Browne, Clark Howard, Dr. Laura, and Coast to Coast AM. The standards format returned two years later.

=== Sports radio ===
Clear Channel announced on November 16, 2006, that it would sell its Bangor stations after the company was bought by private equity firms. Clear Channel's Bangor cluster was sold to Blueberry Broadcasting in 2008. Blueberry again dropped WABI's standards format on September 1, this time for sports talk provided by Boston's WEEI. The station also began to once again simulcast with 97.1, renamed WAEI-FM. Though WABI carried WEEI's talk shows, most game broadcasts were not aired on the station. To reflect the new format, on February 24, 2009, the WABI call letters were dropped after over 84 years and became WAEI.

Blueberry Broadcasting ended WAEI's affiliation with WEEI on January 11, 2010. WEEI programming was replaced with Fox Sports Radio. Blueberry cited a breach of contract. WAEI moved exclusively to the AM dial on February 6, 2012, when WAEI-FM (which had swapped dial positions with WBFB on September 1, 2011, and moved to 104.7 FM) became classic hits station WBAK.

As a sports radio station, in addition to Fox Sports Radio programming, the station aired the syndicated Imus in the Morning and The Jim Rome Show. Other programming included Downtown with Rich Kimball, a locally produced sports talk show hosted by Rich Kimball. Kimball later moved to WEZQ. WAEI also aired NASCAR Nationwide and Camping World Truck Series races, which are now carried by WBAN, and Maine Black Bears basketball and baseball games, which now air on WGUY.

=== Classic hits ===
On September 1, 2013, WAEI was taken off the air. Blueberry officials told the Bangor Daily News, "We have not made any final decisions regarding what’s going to happen with that radio station." In a filing with the Federal Communications Commission (FCC), the company stated that it intended to sell the station, and that if a buyer was not found, the license would be surrendered.

On August 28, 2014, WAEI returned to the air, simulcasting classic hits-formatted WABK-FM from Gardiner. On May 13, 2015, WAEI went silent due to a transmitter failure. On March 3, 2016, WAEI again returned to the air, once again simulcasting WABK-FM. WAEI changed its call sign to WABK on July 26, 2016. (The WABK call letters had originally been on AM 1280 in Gardiner for about five decades; that station was sold in 2014 and switched its call sign to WJYE.)

=== WTOS-FM simulcast ===
On January 11, 2019, WABK switched to a simulcast of Skowhegan-based mainstream rock station WTOS-FM, under the new WTOS call letters. Thanks to WTOS' FM translator, WTOS-FM now has another FM signal in Bangor at 105.3, for listeners who have trouble receiving the principal FM signal at 105.1 FM.

== Translators ==
Broadcast translator for WTOS
Call sign	Frequency	City of license	FID	ERP (W)	Class	Transmitter coordinates	FCC info
W287DM	105.3 FM	Bangor, Maine	202176	250	D	44°46′51.2″N 68°44′50″W	LMS
