= WSEW =

- Sanford, Maine; United States
- Broadcast area: York County, Maine; New Hampshire Seacoast
- Frequency: 88.7 MHz
- Branding: Word 88.7

Programming
- Format: Christian
- Affiliations: Moody Broadcasting Network

Ownership
- Owner: Word Radio Educational Foundation
- Sister stations: WMEK; WRKJ; WWPC

History
- First air date: March 2, 1992
- Former frequencies: 88.5 MHz (1991–2010)

Technical information
- Licensing authority: FCC
- Facility ID: 73718
- Class: B
- ERP: 10,000 watts
- HAAT: 172 meters (564 ft)
- Transmitter coordinates: 43°13′26″N 70°58′17″W

Links
- Public license information: Public file; LMS
- Webcast: Listen live
- Website: www.wordradio.net
- WMEK
- Kennebunkport, Maine; United States
- Frequency: 88.1 MHz
- Branding: Power 88.1

Ownership
- Owner: Word Radio Educational Foundation

History
- First air date: 2012
- Former frequencies: 88.3 MHz (2012–2020)

Technical information
- Facility ID: 171239
- Class: B
- ERP: 18,000 watts
- HAAT: 187 meters (614 ft)
- Transmitter coordinates: 43°25′5.2″N 70°48′2.3″W

Links
- Public license information: Public file; LMS
- Webcast: Listen live

WSEW (88.7 FM; "Word 88.7") is a non-commercial educational radio station licensed to serve Sanford, Maine, United States. The station transmits from near Rochester, New Hampshire. The station is owned by Word Radio Educational Foundation.

WSEW broadcasts a Christian radio format.

== History ==
This station received its original construction permit from the Federal Communications Commission on August 26, 1991. The new station was assigned the WSEW call sign by the FCC on October 4, 1991. WSEW received its license to cover from the FCC on August 20, 1992. In January 2010 the station was approved and began broadcasting on 88.7.

== Sister station ==
In addition to WSEW, Word Radio Educational Foundation operates two other similarly-formatted services: WMEK (88.1 FM) in Kennebunkport, Maine, branded "Power 88.1", and "Word Radio Life", which is carried on WRKJ (89.5 FM) in Westbrook, Maine, and WWPC (91.7 FM) in New Durham, New Hampshire.
