= WQDY-FM =

Radio station in Calais, Maine

WQDY-FM and WALZ-FM

- WQDY office

WQDY-FM: Calais, Maine; WALZ-FM: Machias, Maine; United States
- Broadcast area: Downeast Maine and Saint John/Southwest New Brunswick
- Frequencies: WQDY-FM: 92.7 MHz; WALZ-FM: 95.3 MHz
- Branding: Classic Hits 92.7 & 95.3

Programming
- Format: Classic hits
- Affiliations: Boston Red Sox Radio Network

Ownership
- Owner: WQDY, Inc.
- Sister stations: WCRQ

History
- First air date: WQDY-FM: January 14, 1976; WALZ-FM: November 25, 1978
- Call sign meaning: WQDY-FM: Quoddy; WALZ-FM: Waltz (music)

Technical information
- Licensing authority: FCC
- Facility ID: WQDY-FM: 73915; WALZ-FM: 54578
- Class: WQDY-FM: A; WALZ-FM: A
- ERP: WQDY-FM: 3,000 watts; WALZ-FM: 3,000 watts
- HAAT: WQDY-FM: 91 meters (299 ft); WALZ-FM: 67 meters (220 ft)
- Transmitter coordinates: WQDY-FM: 45°10′2″N 67°16′38″W; WALZ-FM: 44°44′8″N 67°30′11″W

Links
- Public license information: WQDY-FM: Public file; LMS; WALZ-FM: Public file; LMS
- Webcast: Listen live
- Website: www.wqdy.fm

WQDY-FM (92.7 FM), on air as Classic Hits 92.7 & 95.3, is an American radio station licensed to Calais, Maine. The station simulcasts on WALZ-FM (95.3 FM) in Machias, Maine. The station carries a classic hits format that leans towards classic rock, primarily playing rock songs from the 1960s to 1980s, while avoiding pop/dance artists like Michael Jackson, Madonna, and Prince, with a heavy emphasis on local sports, including Boston Red Sox baseball. Previous to the station's owners buying WCRQ in 2003, WQDY-FM was also carried on WQDY (1230 AM).

== History ==
WQDY launched on July 4, 1959. It originally broadcast on AM 1230. Founders John Vondell and John Foster established the station that year. In 1964, it was sold to Buffalo Bob Smith, best known as the host of children's television series Howdy Doody. Smith also had a summer home on Big Lake in Grand Lake Stream. Dan Hollingdale, who started at the station several months after it originally began, rose through the ranks to become station manager under Smith. Hollingdale bought the station from Smith in 1978.

In 1995, WQDY began simulcasting on WALZ-FM 95.3 in Machias, Maine. In 1996, 24/7 operation began on both stations when they were sold to Mike Goodine and Bill McVicar. Goodine had been station manager under Hollingdale. McVicar began career at the station in 1986 as an account executive and play-by-play announcer. In 1998, McVicar, Goodine and partner Roger Holst purchased WALZ-FM in Machias. In 2001, McVicar and Holst took over ownership.

In 2003, WQDY, Inc., acquired WCRQ (102.9 FM) from Citadel Broadcasting.
