= WSVV =

- Searsport, Maine; United States
- Broadcast area: Bangor, Maine
- Frequency: 101.7 MHz
- Branding: K-Love

Programming
- Format: Contemporary Christian
- Network: K-Love

Ownership
- Owner: Educational Media Foundation
- Sister stations: WZVV

History
- First air date: October 10, 1994
- Former call signs: WZYA (1992–1993); WBYA (1993–2001); WFZX (2001–2009); WKVV (2009–2025)
- Call sign meaning: "Searsport K-Love"

Technical information
- Licensing authority: FCC
- Facility ID: 59505
- Class: B1
- ERP: 2,650 watts
- HAAT: 306 meters (1,004 ft)
- Transmitter coordinates: 44.5809°N 68.8970°W

Links
- Public license information: Public file; LMS
- Website: www.klove.com

WSVV (101.7 FM) is a radio station licensed to Searsport, Maine, United States. Established in 1994 as WBYA, the station serves the Bangor area. The station is owned by the Educational Media Foundation. The station carries Educational Media Foundation's K-Love Christian music format, simulcasting co-owned WZVV.

== History ==
During the 1990s, the station was known as "The Wave" with the call letters WBYA (no relation to the current WBYA 105.5 in Camden, Maine) simulcasting the classical music of WAVX in Thomaston. Later, the station was owned by Moonsong Communications, owners of WVOM where it was an adult album alternative station and simulcast WVOM for a time.

After being sold to Clear Channel Communications and becoming WFZX "The Fox", from January 2001 to August 2006 the station primarily focused on classic rock artists such as The Eagles, The Beatles and The Rolling Stones. In September 2006, a shift in programming occurred, playing newer acts such as Nickelback, Three Doors Down, Buckcherry and Red Hot Chili Peppers and still playing harder edged classic rock artists like Aerosmith. A year later, the station would dump the general rock format for Bangor's first modern rock station since the demise of 97X in the 1990s. From 2001 to 2003 and 2004 to 2006 WFZX was simulcast on 97.7 WNSX in Winter Harbor. The station also carried New England Patriots football from 2002 to 2005 and NASCAR racing from Motor Racing Network. Over Clear Channel's nearly seven years of ownership, amidst its format shifts, WFZX's morning show was the syndicated Bob & Tom Show.

The station would carry the modern rock format until Clear Channel sold their entire Maine group to Blueberry Broadcasting. Because of ownership limits in the Bangor market, WGUY and WFZX were to be sold off, carrying an oldies format from September 2008 to February 2009 before adopting the current K-Love format.
