= WHTP-FM =

- Kennebunkport, Maine; United States
- Broadcast area: Southern Maine
- Frequency: 104.7 MHz
- Branding: Hot Radio Maine

Programming
- Format: Rhythmic contemporary hit radio

Ownership
- Owner: Mainestream Media, LLC
- Sister stations: WHTP; WHZP

History
- First air date: December 1, 1994 (as WQEZ)
- Former call signs: WXPT (1990–1994); WBQW (1994); WQEZ (1994–2004); WHXQ (2004–2008); WBQW (2008–2012); WHTP (2012–2020)
- Call sign meaning: "Hot Portland"

Technical information
- Licensing authority: FCC
- Facility ID: 69855
- Class: A
- ERP: 6,000 watts
- HAAT: 87 meters (285 ft)
- Transmitter coordinates: 43°24′16.3″N 70°26′13.1″W
- Repeaters: 1280 WHTP (Gardiner); 1400 WHZP (Veazie)

Links
- Public license information: Public file; LMS
- Webcast: Listen live
- Website: hotradiomaine.com

WHTP-FM (104.7 MHz) is an American radio station licensed to serve the community of Kennebunkport, Maine, serving York County and southern Cumberland County, Maine. Its signal is broadcast from the same location. Established in 1994, WHTP-FM is owned by Mainestream Media. The station broadcasts a rhythmic top 40 format.

WHTP-FM is simulcast in the Lewiston-Auburn and Augusta metro areas on WHTP (1280 AM and 100.3 FM), as well as in Bangor and surrounding areas on WHZP (1400 AM and 102.9 FM).

== History ==
WHTP-FM began broadcasting December 1, 1994, as WQEZ, an easy listening/adult contemporary station owned by Vega Corporation, which also owned WBQQ (99.3 FM). Vega sold the stations to Mariner Broadcasting on June 16, 1997. Mariner sold its stations to Nassau Broadcasting Partners in 2004. That April, Nassau relaunched the station as WHXQ, a classic rock station branded as The Bone and simulcasting with WHXR (106.7 FM, now WXTP). During the summer of 2006, WHXQ/WHXR expanded their playlist and shifted to active rock. WHXQ and WHXR had planned to switch to sports talk provided by Boston's WEEI in January 2008, but the deal between Nassau and WEEI owner Entercom ended up collapsing.

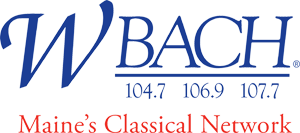
Logo as WBQW

WHXQ swapped formats and call signs with WBQW (106.3 FM, now the current WHXR) on October 6, 2008, and began to carry WBACH's classical music programming (which had originated on WBQQ in 1991; concurrent with the WHXQ/WBQW swap, WBQQ became a simulcast of WTHT). Nassau Broadcasting entered bankruptcy in 2011, which culminated in an auction of its stations. Prior to the conclusion of the auction, the Maine Public Broadcasting Network expressed interest in running the WBACH stations. As part of the bankruptcy proceeding, WBQW was auctioned in May 2012 to local owner Mainestream Media for $150,000, while the other WBACH stations (WBQX in Thomaston and WBQI in Bar Harbor) went to Bill Binnie's WBIN Media Company.

Mainestream Media dropped WBACH's programming at 5 p.m. on September 13, 2012, and began stunting with Christmas music, making the claim of being the first station to switch to Christmas music in 2012, and promoting the "104 Days Of Christmas", saying they would give Portland special "gifts" through the holidays, with the first to come the following day at 5 p.m.. At that time, the station adopted its permanent rhythmic top 40 format, branded as "Hot 104.7". On October 1, WBQW's call letters were changed to WHTP, fitting the "Hot" branding. WHTP currently competes with longtime Top 40 station WJBQ, which has a more mainstream feel to it as compared to WHTP's Rhythmic approach (similar to the former WRED). In February 2013, WHTP was added to Mediabase's Rhythmic panel, reflecting its choice of musical direction.

WHTP began simulcasting on WJYE (1280 AM and 100.3 FM) in Gardiner and WCYR (1400 AM and 102.9 FM) in Veazie on January 13, 2020; to reflect its expanded reach, the station rebranded as "Hot Radio Maine". The station added the "-FM" suffix to its call sign on March 6, 2020.
