= WTOS-FM =

- Skowhegan, Maine; United States
- Broadcast area: Augusta–Bangor, Maine
- Frequency: 105.1 MHz
- Branding: 105 & 101 TOS

Programming
- Format: Mainstream rock

Ownership
- Owner: Blueberry Broadcasting, LLC
- Sister stations: WABK-FM; WQSK; WVQM

History
- First air date: 1969
- Former call signs: WGHM-FM (1969–1972)
- Call sign meaning: Top of Sugarloaf

Technical information
- Licensing authority: FCC
- Facility ID: 46352
- Class: C
- ERP: 57,000 watts
- HAAT: 747 meters (2,451 ft)
- Transmitter coordinates: 45.032°N 70.313°W
- Repeaters: 910 WTOS (Bangor); 101.1 WTUX (Gouldsboro)

Links
- Public license information: Public file; LMS
- Webcast: Listen live
- Website: www.wtosfm.com

WTOS-FM (105.1 MHz), known as "105 & 101 TOS", is a commercial mainstream rock radio station licensed to Skowhegan, Maine, whose studios are located in Augusta. Transmitting from Sugarloaf Mountain, the signal covers a large swath of rural Maine as well as the cities of Augusta, Bangor and Lewiston, and portions of southern Quebec and northern New Hampshire. Its programming is also heard on WTOS (910 AM and 105.3 FM) in Bangor and WTUX (101.1 FM) in Gouldsboro.

== History ==
WTOS-FM originated as a free-form rock music station in 1973 started by John Pineau on 107.1 MHz, with a studio based in Skowhegan, Maine. The tower was moved to the top of Sugarloaf Mountain with an upgrade to 57,000 watts effective radiated power on the current frequency of 105.1 MHz.

WTOS-FM remained locally owned by Mountain Wireless, and gained a reputation as one of the region's more daring stations throughout the 1980s, due to its penchant for playing harder or more obscure rock bands that did not normally appear on commercial radio stations. Music directors Annie Earhardt and Duane Bruce helped to take WTOS-FM in a direction that many others followed. The DJs also had input into what selections were played and an eclectic mix soon prevailed, separating the station from other rock-oriented stations in the region. WTOS-FM struggled with ratings, but was #1 in the Canadian province of Quebec where the signal is heard quite well.

In October 1987 the station changed format from an eclectic college alternative format to a more commercial classic rock format. After a public funeral through downtown Skowhegan for the previous format (organized by then-Music Director Duane Bruce), "The Mountain" continued to build up a large local following of fans, which was especially obvious at its frequent on-location remotes, usually at area bars and nightclubs.

WTOS-FM was acquired by Cumulus Media in late 2000, and the main studios were moved from Skowhegan to Augusta. The association with Cumulus did not last long, as only months later, WTOS-FM was purchased by media giant Clear Channel Communications. In May 2008, WTOS and the 16 other Clear Channel stations in the Augusta and Bangor markets were sold to Blueberry Broadcasting, a Maine-based company headed by Louis Vitale and Bruce Biette. On July 28, 2008, the newly formed Blueberry Broadcasting LLC assumed control of WTOS-FM.

== Broadcast area ==
With a 57,000-watt signal and the advantage of having a tower placed at such a high elevation, WTOS-FM reaches a significant portion of northern New England. The station can be heard over the airwaves from its studios in Augusta to Bangor and as far north as Houlton. It carries into the Estrie region of Quebec province to places such as Cookshire-Eaton, Lac-Mégantic and Thetford Mines, and can be received in eastern Maine in places such as Bar Harbor and Vinalhaven. The station is also heard by listeners in northern New Hampshire and parts of Vermont, although reception can be sporadic in those areas due to interference from the White Mountains. The simulcast on WTUX at 101.1 FM can regularly be heard in Nova Scotia.

In March 2009, Blueberry Broadcasting began to simulcast WTOS-FM's signal on its former talk station WCME on 96.7 FM, expanding to Mid Coast Maine (in May 2009, WCME's call letters were changed to WTQX) and in June 2010 WTUX signed on the air simulcasting WTOS-FM to the Downeast Maine region on 101.1 FM. The 96.7 frequency was sold to Maine Public Broadcasting in July 2017; it is now classical music station WBQA.

== WTOS Battle of the Bands and benefit concerts ==
The WTOS Battle of the Bands took place annually at the Skowhegan fairgrounds in mid-August. The event gained a great deal in popularity over time, and almost 6,000 fans attended the final battle in 2008. The winners of the events included Emptyhead (2003) and Dead Season (2004, 2005, 2006), Civil Disturbance (2007) and Soundbender (2008). Blueberry Broadcasting ended their involvement in the contest after the August 2008 show.

WTOS also hosted Rock Relief every year, raising funds for a different charitable organization each summer. It originated as a response to Hurricane Katrina in 2005, and became an annual event to raise money for charities in need, up through July, 2008. In 2009, Rock Relief took on a year-round dimension as the "WTOS School of Rock" concert series. The series features local and regional bands playing concerts at area high schools that raise money for the school's music program. Several Maine high schools have hosted shows, and as of 2010, over 20 different bands have performed. The concert series was discontinued in 2014.
