= WRKJ =

- Westbrook, Maine; United States
- Broadcast area: Greater Portland
- Frequency: 88.5 MHz
- Branding: Word Radio Life

Programming
- Format: Christian radio

Ownership
- Owner: Word Radio Educational Foundation
- Sister stations: WMEK, WSEW, WWPC

Technical information
- Licensing authority: FCC
- Facility ID: 172500
- Class: A
- ERP: 2,000 watts
- HAAT: 108 meters (354 ft)
- Transmitter coordinates: 43°41′10″N 70°30′30″W

Links
- Public license information: Public file; LMS
- Website: wordradio.net/wrkj-and-wwpc/

WRKJ is a Christian radio station licensed to Westbrook, Maine, broadcasting on 88.5 FM. WRKJ is owned by Word Radio Educational Foundation. The station is also simulcast on 91.7 WWPC in New Durham, New Hampshire.
