= WTUX =

Simulcasting WTOS-FM, Skowhegan
- Gouldsboro, Maine; United States
- Broadcast area: Ellsworth, Maine
- Frequency: 101.1 MHz
- Branding: 105 & 101 TOS

Programming
- Format: Mainstream rock

Ownership
- Owner: Blueberry Broadcasting, LLC
- Sister stations: WBFE; WKSQ

History
- First air date: June 2010
- Former call signs: WLEK (2009–2010, CP)
- Call sign meaning: similar to WTOS

Technical information
- Licensing authority: FCC
- Facility ID: 165949
- Class: B1
- ERP: 17,000 watts
- HAAT: 121.1 meters (397 ft)
- Transmitter coordinates: 44°26′41.3″N 68°1′20″W

Links
- Public license information: Public file; LMS
- Webcast: Listen live
- Website: www.wtosfm.com

WTUX (101.1 FM) is an American mainstream rock radio station licensed to Gouldsboro, Maine, United States. The station is owned by Blueberry Broadcasting, LLC and simulcasts co-owned WTOS-FM.

== History ==
This station received its original construction permit from the Federal Communications Commission (FCC) on May 25, 2006. The new station was assigned the WLEK call sign by the FCC on April 30, 2009.

In April 2008, permit holder Louis Vitali filed an application with the FCC to transfer the permit to a company he controlled, Blueberry Broadcasting, LLC. The transfer was approved by the FCC on April 30, 2008, and the transaction was consummated on June 4, 2008.

On January 7, 2009, WLEK applied to change its community of license to Gouldsboro, Maine. As of May 20, 2009, the FCC had accepted this application for filing but had taken no further action on the request. WLEK received its license to cover with Machias as its community of license from the FCC on May 13, 2009.

WLEK changed its call letters to WTUX on May 20, 2010, and in June 2010 signed on the air, simulcasting Augusta-based WTOS-FM.
