= WNSX =

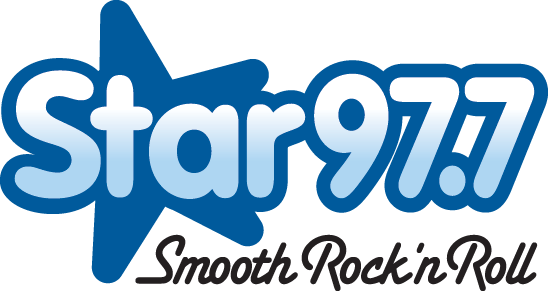
- Winter Harbor, Maine; United States
- Broadcast area: Downeast Maine
- Frequency: 97.7 MHz
- Branding: Star 97.7

Programming
- Format: Classic hits

Ownership
- Owner: Codin Broadcasting, LLC

History
- First air date: 1999

Technical information
- Licensing authority: FCC
- Facility ID: 66712
- Class: B
- ERP: 50,000 watts
- HAAT: 149 meters (489 ft)
- Transmitter coordinates: 44°33′13″N 68°5′40″W

Links
- Public license information: Public file; LMS
- Webcast: Listen Live
- Website: Star977.com

WNSX (97.7 MHz Star 97.7) is a commercial FM radio station broadcasting a classic hits radio format. The station signed on in 1999 as WNSX. Licensed to Winter Harbor, Maine, the station's studios and offices are on Maine State Route 3 (High Street) in Ellsworth. It serves Downeast Maine, including Ellsworth, Bar Harbor, Bucksport, and Machias.

WNSX is owned by Codin Broadcasting, LLC. WNSX's music format is a mix which includes primarily soft to mid-tempo classic rock artists such as The Eagles, Boston, The Beatles, Fleetwood Mac, Elton John, Billy Joel, Heart, and Chicago. The station uses the slogan "Smooth Rock 'n' Roll" to indicate that it does not play rock songs that are too hard-edged.

WNSX's transmitter is off Tunk Lake Road in Sullivan. The station's primary signal serves Hancock and Washington Counties.

== History ==
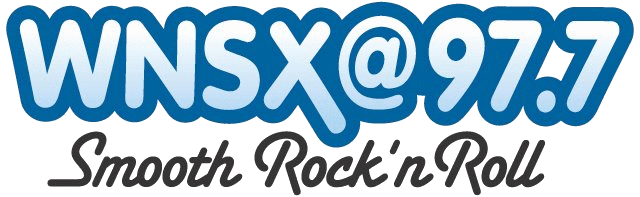
The former logo of WNSX from 2005 until August 31, 2014, under their "Smooth Rock 'n Roll" branding

Maine businessman Scott Hogg was granted a construction permit from the Federal Communications Commission to build a new FM station at 97.7 in the mid-1990s. It used the call sign WAKN before making it to the air.

The station signed on in 1999 as WNSX. It originally simulcast its then-sister station WMDI (now WBKA).

In 2001, the station was purchased by Clear Channel Communications for $1.1 million. It began simulcasting the classic rock format of its sister station 101.7 WFZX. WNSX later flipped to a sports radio format, carrying Fox Sports Radio for several years before returning to a simulcast of WFZX.

In 2005, the station was sold to Stony Creek Broadcasting, with Mark L. Osborne as managing member. The cost was $800,000. WNSX then switched to its current format of classic hits, originally focusing on soft to mid-tempo classic rock artists from the 1960s to 1980s. In 2022, 1990s music was slowly being added to the playlist. In 2024, the station began adding more pop-leaning artists like Michael Jackson, Madonna, and Prince to its playlist while retaining its focus on classic rock artists. In 2025, 2000s music was slowly being added to the playlist.

In 2024, the station was sold to Codin Broadcasting, LLC.
