= WQSS =

Simulcasts WKSQ, Ellsworth
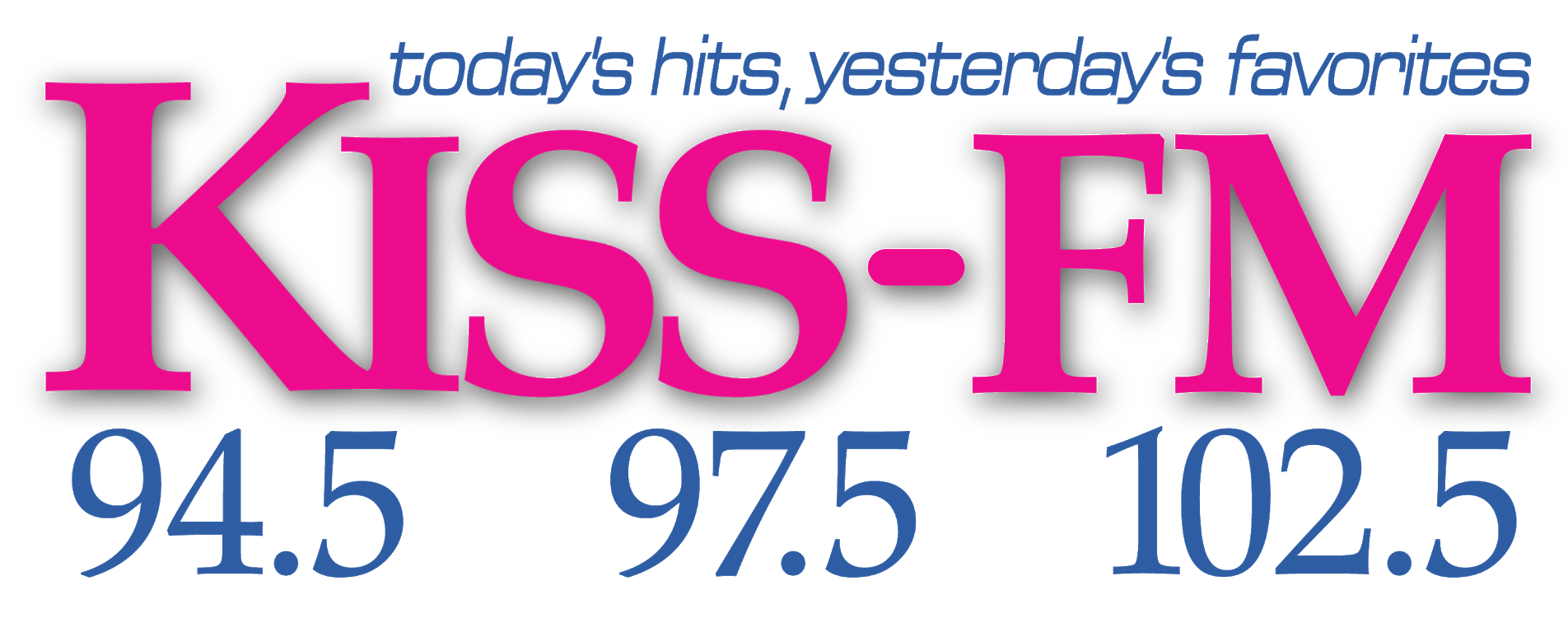
- Camden, Maine; United States
- Broadcast area: Mid Coast
- Frequency: 102.5 MHz
- Branding: Kiss FM

Programming
- Format: Hot adult contemporary
- Affiliations: Westwood One

Ownership
- Owner: Blueberry Broadcasting; (Blueberry Broadcasting, LLC)

History
- First air date: May 1988
- Former call signs: WESK (1985–1986); WMFT (1986–1988)

Technical information
- Licensing authority: FCC
- Facility ID: 41104
- Class: B
- ERP: 20,500 watts
- HAAT: 225 meters (738 ft)
- Transmitter coordinates: 44°7′36.9″N 69°8′26.3″W

Links
- Public license information: Public file; LMS
- Webcast: Listen live
- Website: www.kissfm.net

WQSS (102.5 FM, "Kiss FM") is a radio station licensed to Camden, Maine, with studios in Augusta, Maine. The station, owned by Blueberry Broadcasting, broadcasts a hot adult contemporary format simulcast with WKSQ (94.5 FM) in Ellsworth and WQSK (97.5 FM) in Madison.

== History ==
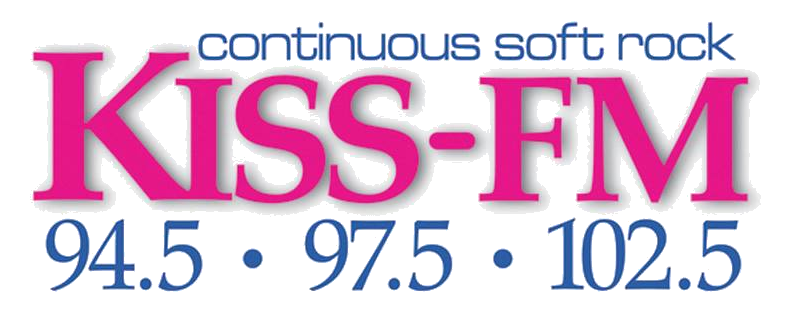
Former logo used from February 24, 2014 through August 31, 2018

WQSS began broadcasting in May 1988. The first song played was "Here Comes The Sun" by the Beatles. For many years, WQSS was known as "Coast 102.5" and had an adult contemporary format, with studios located in Camden. Until December 26, 2008, the station was known as "102-5 The Peak" playing a classic hits format. WQSS then changed back to adult contemporary, as "Midcoast 102.5". On February 24, 2014, the station began to simulcast with WKSQ and WQSK as "Kiss FM".
