= WVQM =

Simulcasting WVOM-FM, Howland–Bangor
- Augusta, Maine; United States
- Broadcast area: Kennebec and Somerset County, Maine
- Frequency: 101.3 MHz
- Branding: VOM, The Voice of Maine

Programming
- Format: Talk
- Affiliations: Premiere Networks; Fox News Radio; University of Maine Black Bears Football Network

Ownership
- Owner: Blueberry Broadcasting, LLC
- Sister stations: WABK-FM; WQSK; WMCM; WVOM-FM; WQSS; WTOS-FM

History
- First air date: July 1961
- Former call signs: WFAU-FM (1961–1982); WKCG (1982–2009)
- Call sign meaning: similar to WVOM

Technical information
- Licensing authority: FCC
- Facility ID: 68660
- Class: B
- ERP: 41,000 watts
- HAAT: 113 meters (371 ft)
- Transmitter coordinates: 44°18′36.2″N 69°49′49.2″W

Links
- Public license information: Public file; LMS
- Webcast: Listen live
- Website: www.wvomfm.com

WVQM (101.3 FM) is a commercial radio station in Augusta, Maine, United States. It simulcasts a talk radio format with 103.9 WVOM-FM in Bangor. The stations are owned by Blueberry Broadcasting. The studios and offices are on Target Industrial Circle in Bangor with additional studios at Community Drive in Augusta.

WVQM has an effective radiated power (ERP) of 41,000 watts. The transmitter is on Winthrop Street in Hallowell, Maine.

== Programming ==
Weekdays on WVQM and WVOM-FM begin with a local news and information show hosted by George Hale and Ric Tyler. The rest of the weekday schedule is from nationally syndicated conservative talk shows: Glenn Beck, The Clay Travis and Buck Sexton Show, Howie Carr, Sean Hannity, Ground Zero with Clyde Lewis and Coast to Coast AM with George Noory.

Weekends feature shows on health, money, technology, the outdoors, food, real estate, cars, senior citizens and repeats of weekday shows. Weekend hosts include Kim Komando, Somewhere in Time with Art Bell and The Car Doctor with Ron Ananian. WVQM and WVOM carry University of Maine Black Bears Football. Most hours begin with world and national news from Fox News Radio.

== History ==
In July 1961, the station signed on as WFAU-FM, the FM counterpart to WFAU 1340 AM (now WMDR). It largely simulcast the AM's programming.

On July 5, 1982, the station changed its call sign to WKCG. WKCG played country music until March 1, 1999, when the station adopted the adult contemporary format vacated by then sister station WCTB.

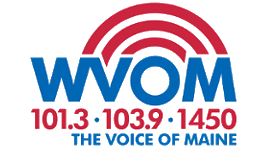
Former logo

On January 5, 2009, the station dropped the Star 101 imaging and the adult contemporary format for a simulcast of talk radio station WVOM. WCME picked up the adult contemporary format and the Star imaging before switching several months later to a simulcast of WTOS-FM. In February 2009, WKCG switched call signs to WVQM, similar to its simulcast partner WVOM.
