= WHZP =

Simulcast of WHTP-FM, Kennebunkport
- Veazie, Maine; United States
- Broadcast area: Bangor, Maine; Brewer, Maine; Old Town, Maine; Orono, Maine
- Frequency: 1400 kHz
- Branding: Hot Radio Maine

Programming
- Format: Rhythmic contemporary hit radio

Ownership
- Owner: MaineInvests, LLC
- Sister stations: WHTP; WHTP-FM

History
- First air date: August 2004 (as WWNZ)
- Former call signs: WWNZ (2001–2016); WCYR (2016–2020)
- Call sign meaning: similar to WHTP

Technical information
- Licensing authority: FCC
- Facility ID: 128805
- Class: C
- Power: 1,000 watts day; 810 watts night
- Transmitter coordinates: 44°50′50.25″N 68°40′43.12″W
- Translator: 102.9 W275CQ (Bangor)

Links
- Public license information: Public file; LMS
- Webcast: Listen live
- Website: hotradiomaine.com

WHZP (1400 AM) is a broadcast radio station licensed to Veazie, Maine, serving Bangor, Brewer, Old Town, and Orono in Maine. WHZP is owned and operated by MaineInvests, LLC.

== History ==
On January 9, 2020, the then-WCYR dropped its classic country format and began simulcasting with WJYE in Gardiner, which itself had begun stunting with a loop of Drake's "Hotline Bling", pending the launch of a new format on January 13. On that day, WCYR and WJYE began a trimulcast with sister station WHTP in Portland, and rebranded as Hot Radio Maine. The stunt came shortly after the sale of WCYR to WJYE's ownership was announced; the sale was consummated on January 31, 2020. The call sign was changed to WHZP on March 1, 2020.

== Translator ==
Call sign	Frequency	City of license	FID	ERP (W)	HAAT	Class	Transmitter coordinates	FCC info
W275CQ	102.9 FM	Bangor, Maine	200817	250	42 m (138 ft)	D	44°50′49.8″N 68°40′43.4″W	LMS
