= WUMM =

- Machias, Maine; United States
- Frequency: 91.1 MHz

Programming
- Format: Eclectic
- Affiliations: University of Maine at Machias, Maine Association of Broadcasters, College Music Journal

Ownership
- Owner: University of Maine at Machias; (University of Maine System)

History
- Former frequencies: 91.7 MHz (2009–2016)
- Call sign meaning: University of Maine at Machias

Technical information
- Licensing authority: FCC
- Facility ID: 172503
- Class: A
- ERP: 250 watts
- HAAT: 23.0 meters
- Transmitter coordinates: 44°42′26″N 67°27′22″W

Links
- Public license information: Public file; LMS
- Webcast: Listen Live
- Website: WUMM within UMM's website

WUMM (91.1 FM) is a radio station licensed to Machias, Maine. The station is owned by the University of Maine System and operated by students of the University of Maine at Machias. Previous to 91.1, University of Maine at Machias operated a low power radio station on 90.5 and 90.7, then over the air at 91.7 and under its current license at 91.1. .

== History ==
In 1996 the Student Center at UMM decided that it would research and apply for a license to operate its first radio station. It was in the Spring of 1997 that WUMM first went out over the air as a leaky cable one watt radio station. In 2001, an internet broadcast was added, which allowed people to listen to the station anywhere in the world. In the Fall 2006, WUMM applied for a 100 watt Class A license, which was granted in the Summer of 2008. Over the next few months, the equipment was purchased. It was in January 2009 that WUMM began to broadcast over the air as a 100 watt radio station.
