= WABK-FM =

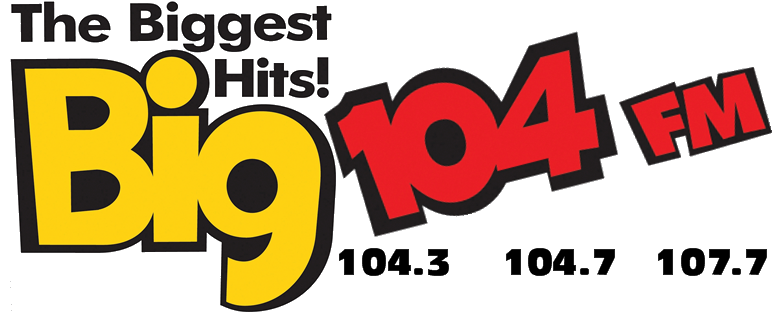
- Gardiner, Maine; United States
- Broadcast area: Augusta; Central Maine
- Frequency: 104.3 MHz
- Branding: Big 104

Programming
- Format: Classic hits

Ownership
- Owner: Blueberry Broadcasting; (Blueberry Broadcasting, LLC)
- Sister stations: WQSK; WTOS-FM; WVQM

History
- First air date: April 1, 1974
- Former call signs: WKME (1974–1978); WABK-FM (1978–2013); WABK (2013–2016)

Technical information
- Licensing authority: FCC
- Facility ID: 68297
- Class: B
- ERP: 50,000 watts
- HAAT: 113 meters (371 ft)
- Transmitter coordinates: 44.310°N 69.830°W
- Repeaters: 104.7 WBAK (Belfast); 107.7 WBKA (Trenton)

Links
- Public license information: Public file; LMS
- Webcast: Listen live
- Website: www.big104fm.com

WABK-FM (104.3 MHz) is a commercial FM radio station licensed to Gardiner, Maine, and serving Augusta and Central Maine. It airs a classic hits radio format. WABK-FM is part of a three-way simulcast with WBAK (104.7 FM) in Belfast and WBKA (107.7 FM) in Bar Harbor. They are owned by Blueberry Broadcasting with studios and offices on Target Industrial Circle in Bangor.

WABK-FM has an effective radiated power of 50,000 watts. Its transmitter is off Winthrop Street in Hallowell.

== History ==
WABK first signed on as an AM station, in the fall of 1968. It aired an adult leaning Top 40 format on 1280 kHz (today WHTP). WABK-FM signed on during the summer of 1974 with the call letters WKME and featured Drake-Chenault's automated "Hit Parade" format. In February 1978, the original studios in Farmingdale were destroyed by fire.

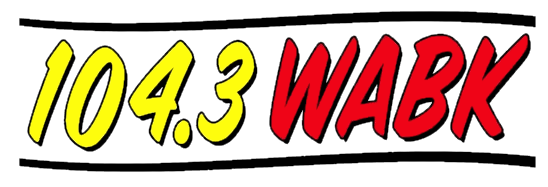
Logo of the station between 1978 and 2013

As the stations rebuilt, WKME's call sign was changed to WABK-FM. Both the AM and FM stations began simulcasting an up-tempo full service adult contemporary format with an emphasis on local personalities, news and community involvement. The simulcast ended in 1983 when WABK (AM) changed its format to country music. It later tried oldies, then adult standards and finally in the late 1990s switched to sports radio with the call letters WFAU. In 1994, WABK-FM became "Oldies 104" but gradually shed the oldies image, playing more 1970s and 1980s music and billing itself as "Super Hits 104 WABK".

In January 2013, WABK-FM rebranded as "Big 104 FM", airing a classic hits format. It also began simulcasting on WBAK (104.7 FM) in Belfast and WBKA (107.7 FM) in Bar Harbor. From August 30, 2013, to July 26, 2016, the call sign on 104.3 in Gardiner was modified to WABK, without the "-FM" suffix.

In 2014, the former WABI/WAEI at 910 AM in Bangor was added to the simulcast. In 2016, the AM's station's call letters were switched to WABK, and 104.3 WABK once again added the "-FM" suffix to its call sign. In January 2019, 910 AM dropped WABK-FM's programming and became WTOS, a simulcast of WTOS-FM.
