= WBFB =

- Bangor, Maine; United States
- Broadcast area: Penobscot County, Maine
- Frequency: 97.1 MHz
- Branding: 97.1 The Bear

Programming
- Format: Country
- Affiliations: Premiere Networks; Motor Racing Network

Ownership
- Owner: Blueberry Broadcasting; (Blueberry Broadcasting, LLC)
- Sister stations: WBAK; WBFE; WKSQ; WTOS; WVOM-FM

History
- First air date: March 15, 1961
- Former call signs: WABI-FM (1961–1973); WBGW (1973–1986); WYOU-FM (1986–1995); WWBX (1995–2008); WAEI (2008–2009); WAEI-FM (2009–2011)
- Call sign meaning: Belfast Bear (format originally started on 104.7 FM, licensed to Belfast)

Technical information
- Licensing authority: FCC
- Facility ID: 3671
- Class: B
- ERP: 6,500 watts
- HAAT: 375 meters (1,230 ft)
- Transmitter coordinates: 44°42′12.3″N 69°4′45.2″W
- Repeaters: 99.1 WBFE (Bar Harbor); 103.3 WMCM (Rockland)

Links
- Public license information: Public file; LMS
- Webcast: Listen live
- Website: www.971thebear.com

WBFB (97.1 FM, "97-1 The Bear") is a commercial radio station in Bangor, Maine. The station is owned by Blueberry Broadcasting and airs a country music radio format, simulcast on sister stations WBFE in Bar Harbor and WMCM in Rockland.

The transmitter is off Maine State Route 9 in Dixmont, Maine, using the same tower as WABI-TV. The studios and offices are on Target Industrial Circle in Bangor.

WBFB begins each weekday with the syndicated, Nashville-based Bobby Bones Show from Premiere Networks. Local disc jockeys handle the other hours of the day. On Sunday mornings, Bob Kingsley's Country Top 40 is heard. Car races from the Motor Racing Network are heard on some weekends. After the Bobby Bones Show wraps up, WBFB promises to play nine songs in a row without commercial interruption, throughout the day. It also uses an electronic female voice to list the artist and title of every song when they conclude.

== History ==
=== WABI-FM ===
The 97.1 frequency has a long history in Bangor, signing on the air on March 15, 1961. The original call sign was WABI-FM, owned by the Community Broadcasting Service. Community Broadcasting also owned WABI (now WTOS) and WABI-TV. WABI-FM initially simulcast WABI.

=== "Big Country" ===
In the 1970s, as more people began owning radios that received FM signals, Community Broadcasting decided to make a change on WABI-FM. On March 1, 1973, the station became "Big Country" WBGW, airing an automated country music format. The WBGW call sign stood for "Bangor Goes Western".

Community Broadcasting Service merged with Journal Publications in 1971 to form Diversified Communications. The company's broadcasting division retained the Community Broadcasting Service name until 1982, when WBGW was transferred to Diversified directly. The call letters were changed to WYOU-FM in October 1986, with no change in format; the WYOU call sign, which Diversified had acquired earlier in the year, was shared with the company's television station in Scranton, Pennsylvania.

Diversified announced in 1993 that it would put most of its broadcasting properties, including WYOU and WABI, up for sale. While it would retain WABI-TV following the collapse of a deal to sell it to Vision Communications, the radio stations were sold to Bangor Radio Corporation.

=== WWBX ===
In October 1995, WYOU adopted an alternative rock format, "97-X", aimed at Generation X; the call sign would change to WWBX on November 20. The format did not attain sufficient support from advertisers, leading WWBX to move to modern adult contemporary programming from ABC Radio Networks in February 1997; that April, the station shifted to a soft adult contemporary format, which included a simulcast of George Hale's WABI radio morning show. WWBX and WABI were sold to Gopher Hill Broadcasting in 1997.

WWBX was instrumental in storm coverage during the North American ice storm of 1998. Morning host Michael W. Hale made the decision to suspend the music format and allow open phones and dialogue to help those with no power. The station allowed listeners from central and eastern Maine to call in and share stories of prior storms, survival tips and to let people know they were still waiting for power. Hale was so inundated with calls, the station effectively became a talk station for a time. Les Newsome, Cindy Michaels (who later worked at WVII-TV), Ted Wallace, Dave Glidden and Rob "On The Radio" Rosewall kept WWBX listeners informed about efforts to restore power and services. Inbound calls for help and assistance were so many, volunteers came to the station to take calls. The station than returned to its regular format after power was restored.

In September 1998, the format was again changed to Top 40, with an on-air slogan of "B97". The station was a quick success, giving cross-town rival WBZN new competition. The ratings were often close, with DJs from both stations involved in a friendly rivalry.

Clear Channel Communications bought WWBX and WABI in 2001 for $3.75 million. Clear Channel (today iHeartMedia) owned the two stations for five years. The company announced on November 16, 2006, that it would sell its Bangor stations. WWBX and WABI were bought by Blueberry Broadcasting in 2008.

=== Sports radio ===
On September 1, 2008, WWBX dropped the top 40 format in favor of sports talk provided by Boston's WEEI. Programming was also simulcast on WABI. The FM call letters were changed to WAEI. The call letters were modified to WAEI-FM in February 2009, in order to install the WAEI call letters on WABI. Though WAEI-AM-FM carried WEEI's talk shows, most game broadcasts were not aired on 97.1 or AM 910. However, they were the flagship stations of the Maine Black Bears Network from 2008 until 2011, when WAEI-FM was replaced by sister station WKSQ (WAEI's AM frequency remained a co-flagship).

Blueberry Broadcasting ended WAEI's affiliation with WEEI on January 11, 2010. WEEI programming was replaced with Fox Sports Radio, Imus in the Morning, and The Jim Rome Show. Blueberry cited a breach of contract.

=== "The Bear" ===
Blueberry Broadcasting swapped the formats and call signs of WAEI-FM and WBFB (104.7 FM) on September 1, 2011. WBFB's "Bear" country music programming moved to 97.1, in effect returning the format to the frequency after a sixteen-year absence. (WAEI-FM 104.7 became classic hits station WBAK the following February, leaving the sports format on WAEI's 910 AM frequency.)

The "Bear" country format originated on the 104.7 FM frequency on September 20, 1996, replacing top 40 station WWFX ("Fox 104.7"); the first song was "Gone Country" by Alan Jackson. The change, which gave rival WQCB its first competition since WYOU-FM became WWBX a year earlier, came soon after WWFX was sold by Group H Radio to Star Broadcasting, a company owned by Mark Osborne and Natalie Knox (current owners of WNSX) that already owned WKSQ and WLKE. The format change was intended to minimize overlap with WKSQ's playlist. The WWFX call letters were replaced with WBFB on April 25, 1997 after the station attempted to obtain the WEBR call sign.

Osborne and Knox sold WBFB, WKSQ, and WLKE to Communications Capital Managers in February 2000; that July, CCM announced that it would sell the group (which through other purchases also included WBYA, WGUY, and WVOM) to Clear Channel. Blueberry Broadcasting bought the station along with the other Clear Channel stations in Maine in 2008; on September 28, 2009, WBFB began simulcasting on WLKE and WMCM, replacing their separate country formats. (WLKE would change its call letters to WBFE in 2013.) WBFB moved to 97.1 FM, swapping with WAEI-FM, on September 1, 2011.
