= WBFE =

Country music radio station in Bar Harbor, Maine

Simulcasts WBFB, Bangor
- Bar Harbor, Maine; United States
- Broadcast area: Mount Desert Island, Downeast Maine
- Frequency: 99.1 MHz
- Branding: The Bear

Programming
- Format: Country
- Affiliations: Motor Racing Network; Premiere Networks

Ownership
- Owner: Blueberry Broadcasting; (Blueberry Broadcasting, LLC)

History
- First air date: June 1992
- Former call signs: WPRG (1988–1992); WLKE (1992–2013)
- Call sign meaning: similar to WBFB

Technical information
- Licensing authority: FCC
- Facility ID: 62289
- Class: B
- ERP: 45,000 watts
- HAAT: 121 meters (397 ft)
- Transmitter coordinates: 44°26′41.3″N 68°1′20″W

Links
- Public license information: Public file; LMS
- Webcast: Listen live
- Website: www.971thebear.com

WBFE (99.1 FM) is an American radio station broadcasting a country music format simulcasting WBFB. Licensed to Bar Harbor, Maine, United States, the station serves the Down East Maine area. The station is owned by Blueberry Broadcasting. Under proper weather conditions, the station's signal can reach both southwestern New Brunswick and southwestern Nova Scotia, Canada.

== History ==
The station was assigned call sign WPRG on March 24, 1988. On May 19, 1992, the station changed its call sign to WLKE; that June, it signed on. As of September 28, 2009, it became part of a three station country network based out of Blueberry's Bangor office, simulcasting WBFB and also heard on WMCM. On September 23, 2013, the station took its current WBFE call sign. Prior to September 28, 2009, the station was branded as "Lucky 99.1".
