= WZVV =

K-Love radio station in Dexter, Maine, United States

- Dexter, Maine; United States
- Broadcast area: Bangor, Maine
- Frequency: 102.1 MHz
- Branding: K-Love

Programming
- Format: Contemporary Christian
- Network: K-Love

Ownership
- Owner: Educational Media Foundation
- Sister stations: WSVV

History
- First air date: 1993
- Former call signs: WGUY (1989–2009); WKVZ (2009–2025)

Technical information
- Licensing authority: FCC
- Facility ID: 28685
- Class: C2
- ERP: 27,000 watts
- HAAT: 205 meters (673 ft)
- Transmitter coordinates: 45°2′40.2″N 69°14′59.1″W

Links
- Public license information: Public file; LMS
- Webcast: Listen live
- Website: www.klove.com

WZVV (102.1 FM) is a radio station broadcasting a contemporary Christian format. Licensed to Dexter, Maine, United States, the station serves the Bangor area. The station is owned by the Educational Media Foundation and features programming from the K-Love network.

== History ==
The 102.1 FM frequency in Dexter went on the air in 1993 as WGUY, an oldies station. In December 2001, the station changed to a satellite smooth jazz format, then reverted to the oldies format in March 2003. The station carried University of Maine men's and women's basketball for the 2007 season before moving to WAEI. In September 2008, WGUY began simulcasting on co-owned WFZX before being sold to Educational Media Foundation and changing formats in February 2009 to K-Love's Christian music format.
