= WMPG =

Gorham, Maine; United States
- Broadcast area: Southern Maine Coast
- Frequency: 90.9 MHz (HD Radio)

Programming
- Format: Community radio
- Affiliations: Pacifica Radio Network

Ownership
- Owner: University of Maine System

History
- First air date: 1973
- Call sign meaning: Maine Portland-Gorham (former name of the University of Southern Maine)

Technical information
- Licensing authority: FCC
- Facility ID: 69132
- Class: B1
- ERP: 4,500 watts
- HAAT: 195 meters (640 ft)
- Transmitter coordinates: 43°44′38″N 70°19′59″W

Links
- Public license information: Public file; LMS
- Webcast: Listen live
- Website: www.wmpg.org

WMPG (90.9 FM) is a community radio station broadcasting from Portland, Maine. It is located on Bedford Street at the University of Southern Maine Portland Campus. It is affiliated with the college, and a mix of USM students and volunteers from the greater Portland community produce all the music and local public affairs programs. It broadcasts 4.5 kilowatts on 90.9 (licensed to Gorham, where the main campus of USM is located).

== History ==
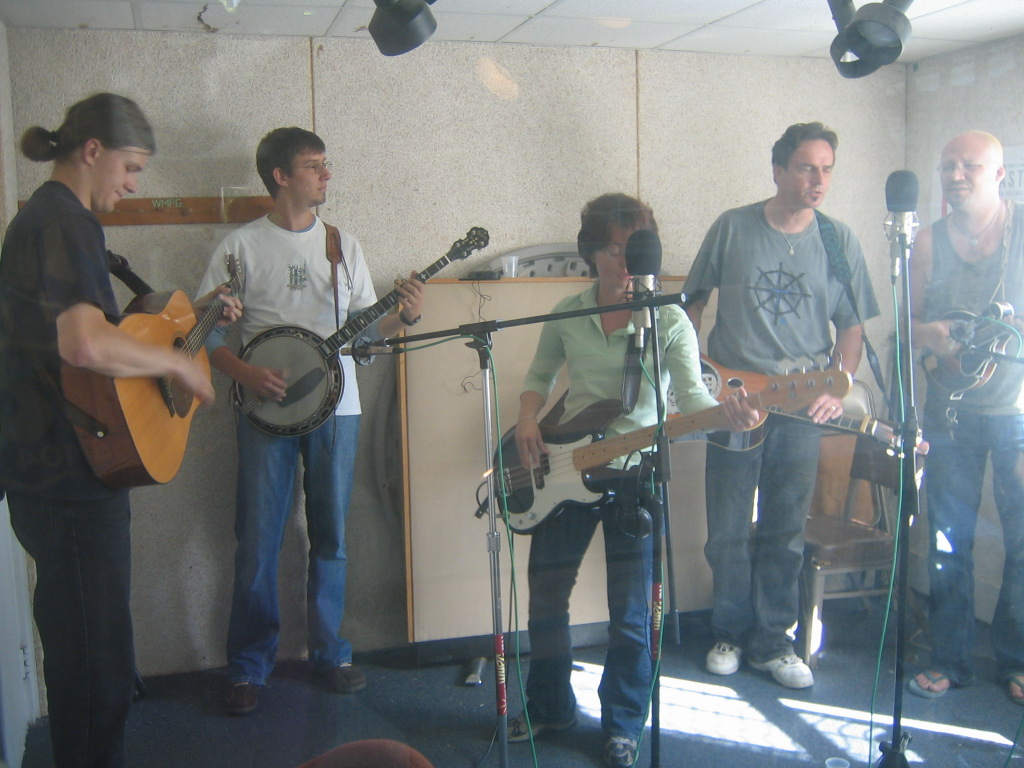
European bluegrass group Fragment performs in studio July 2005.

The station was founded in 1970 by then eighteen year old freshman of the University of Southern Maine Howard Allen. Allen began that station in his dorm room in Anderson Hall on the Gorham campus with a small pirate-radio transmitter, a set of turntables, and his private record collection. At its inception, it was a carrier current station broadcasting under the call sign WGOR. Soon, other students became involved in the station, a club was formed to manage it which was subsequently recognized by the student government, and funded by the student activity fee. The club set up a large antenna on the roof of Anderson Hall which allowed the station's weak signal to reach further into the town of Gorham. Since most radio stations in the 1970s were transmitting on the AM frequency, Allen selected a frequency on the FM frequency, and WGOR began emitting a 100 milliwatt signal on 91.FM.

The school administration did not become aware of the station until 1972 when a local newspaper wrote an article about WGOR. Seeing the station's educational potential, university administration arranged for Bill Crosby, the chief engineer of Maine Public Broadcasting Network (MPBN) in Orono, to help Allen and the club apply for FCC licensure. The broadcast license was granted by the FCC in the summer 1973 with a 10 watt signal reaching from Gorham to most of Portland. Allen graduated in 1974 leaving the station in the hands of future students.

In 1988 the station upgraded its signal to 1.11 kilowatts and shifted frequency to 90.9 MHz. A 50 watt translator on 104.1 MHz located on Portland's Munjoy Hill went on the air in 1999. In 2008 WMPG was granted a construction permit to increase power to 4.5 kilowatts and move transmitting facilities from the Gorham campus of the University of Southern Maine to Blackstrap Mountain in Falmouth. After a lengthy fund-raising effort and a $120,000 US Department of Commerce grant WMPG started broadcasting at half its licensed upgraded power from the new transmitter site on December 14, 2011, one day before the construction permit was to expire. The 104.1 translator was sold to MPBN in 2016.

== See also ==
- List of community radio stations in the United States
