= WHTP (AM) =

Simulcast of WHTP-FM, Kennebunkport
- Gardiner, Maine; United States
- Broadcast area: Lewiston-Auburn; Brunswick; Augusta, Maine
- Frequency: 1280 kHz
- Branding: Hot Radio Maine

Programming
- Format: Rhythmic CHR

Ownership
- Owner: MaineInvests LLC
- Sister stations: WHTP-FM; WHZP

History
- First air date: September 23, 1968 (as WABK)
- Former call signs: WABK (1968–1987); WQZN (1987–1988); WABK (1988–1994); WFAU (1994–2014); WJYE (2014–2020)
- Call sign meaning: derived from sister station WHTP-FM

Technical information
- Licensing authority: FCC
- Facility ID: 68296
- Class: D
- Power: 250 watts day; 40 watts night
- Transmitter coordinates: 44°14′56.25″N 69°48′48.16″W
- Translator: 100.3 W262DP (Gardiner)

Links
- Public license information: Public file; LMS
- Webcast: Listen live
- Website: hotradiomaine.com

WHTP (1280 kHz) is a commercial AM radio station licensed to Gardiner, Maine, United States. It serves the Lewiston-Auburn and Augusta metropolitan areas. The station is owned by MaineInvests LLC. It airs a rhythmic contemporary format, branded as Hot Radio Maine, simulcast with WHTP-FM 104.7 in Kennebunkport and WHZP (1400 AM) in Veazie.

WHTP’s daytime power is 250 watts, using a non-directional antenna. At night, to avoid interfering with other stations on AM 1280, it reduces power to 40 watts. The transmitter is located off Northern Avenue in Farmingdale, near the Maine Turnpike. WHTP is also simulcast on an FM translator station, 100.3 W262DP in Gardiner.

== History ==
=== Early years as WABK ===
The station first signed on the air on September 1, 1968. Its original call sign was WABK, owned by Abenaki Company. The station had a middle of the road format by 1971. It later moved to a full service adult contemporary sound. An FM sister station, WKME (104.3 FM), was added in 1974.

Two years later, WABK shifted to a talk/MOR format. In 1977, the station was sold to Tryon Communications, and talk programming was dropped. WABK became a network affiliate of ABC Radio. WABK began simulcasting with WABK-FM, which previously aired the Drake-Chenault syndicated format known as "Hit Parade." WABK returned to its own programming by 1984.

=== WQZN and WFAU ===
The station's callsign was changed to WQZN on January 1, 1987. The WABK call sign returned one year later, on January 31, 1988. WABK switched to an adult contemporary format that was largely simulcast with WABK-FM, although the AM station incorporated some of its own news programming.

On September 8, 1994, the station took the WFAU call sign and adult standards format, moved over from 1340 AM, which then became WMDR. WFAU had broadcast at 1340 AM since October 2, 1946.

=== Cumulus, Clear Channel, and Blueberry ownership ===
Tryon sold its Central Maine stations to Cumulus Media in 1998. Cumulus, in turn, sold the stations to Clear Channel Communications in 2000. Clear Channel dropped the standards format in 2001 in favor of a simulcast of Skowhegan-based sports radio station WSKW (1160 AM).

A local marketing agreement between Clear Channel and WSKW owner Mountain Wireless ended in 2003. The simulcast with WSKW was ended; WFAU, along with WIGY in Madison (now WQSK), dropped ESPN Radio in favor of Fox Sports Radio. WSKW kept its ESPN Radio affiliation. The programming of WFAU and WIGY were eventually combined with WRKD (1450 AM) in Rockland (later WVOM) to form "Fox Sports Maine".

Clear Channel announced on November 16, 2006, that it would sell its Central Maine stations after being bought by private equity firms. The stations were sold to Blueberry Broadcasting in 2008.

=== Bob Bittner and MaineInvests ownership ===
Blueberry took WFAU off the air on July 1, 2013, to facilitate repairs to its antenna switching system. Shortly afterward, the station was purchased for $16,200 by Blue Jey Broadcasting, owned by Bob Bittner. Bittner assumed control on September 27, 2013.

The station returned to the air on October 16. It began airing an adult standards/oldies format similar to Bittner's other stations, WJTO in Bath and WJIB in Cambridge, Massachusetts. The call letters were changed to WJYE on October 22, 2014; in explaining the change, Bittner said that "FAU spelled FAilUre".

On February 9, 2015, WJYE changed its format to classic country, branded as "Country Memories 1280." On July 29, 2019, MaineInvests LLC completed its purchase of WJYE from Blue Jey Broadcasting and switched the station to a 1960s-1970s oldies format as "Fun Oldies 1280".

On January 9, 2020, WJYE dropped its oldies format and began stunting as 207 Hotline Bling Radio, with a loop of Drake's "Hotline Bling". The stunt was also being simulcast on WCYR in Veazie, which dropped its classic country format. It was announced that a new format would launch on the morning of January 13. On that day, WJYE and WCYR began a trimulcast branded as Hot Radio Maine with sister station WHTP from Kennebunkport, which serves York County, southern Cumberland County (including Portland), and WCYR, which serves Bangor. The call sign was changed to WHTP on March 6, 2020.

== Translator ==
Broadcast translator for WHTP
Call sign	Frequency	City of license	FID	ERP (W)	HAAT	Class	Transmitter coordinates	FCC info
W262DP	100.3 FM	Gardiner, Maine	202491	123	274 m (899 ft)	D	44°9′15″N 70°0′35″W	LMS
