= Midcoast =

Region of Maine

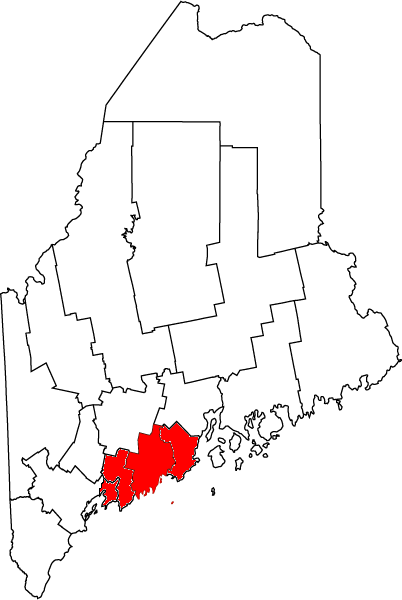
- Composition: Knox; Lincoln; Sagadahoc; Waldo; part of Cumberland
- Largest city: Brunswick

Area
  - Total: 3,250 sq mi (8,400 km^{2})
  - Land: 1,876 sq mi (4,860 km^{2})
  - Water: 1,374 sq mi (3,560 km^{2})

Population (2020)
  - Total: 178,937
  - Density: 95.38/sq mi (36.83/km^{2})
- Demonym: Midcoaster

The Midcoast is a region of the U.S. state of Maine that includes the coastal counties of Knox, Lincoln, and Sagadahoc; most of Waldo and a small portion of Cumberland County. The region generally starts at Brunswick and extends north to Belfast The Midcoast is a popular tourist destination, and many people own summer homes in the region. The area includes much of Maine's rock-bound coast.

== Communities ==
Some notable communities within the Midcoast are listed below.

Name	County	Population (2020)
Bath	Sagadahoc	10,676 (Note: Population includes West Bath)
Belfast	Waldo	6,938
Boothbay Harbor	Lincoln	5,031 (Note: Population includes Boothbay)
Bowdoinham	Sagadahoc	3,047
Brunswick	Cumberland	21,756
Camden	Knox	5,232
Damariscotta	Lincoln	2,297
Newcastle	Lincoln	1,848
Rockland	Knox	6,936
Richmond	Sagadahoc	3,522
Searsport	Waldo	2,649
Topsham	Sagadahoc	9,560
Thomaston	Knox	4,250 (Note: Population Includes South Thomaston)
Unity	Waldo	2,292
Waldoboro	Lincoln	5,154
Winterport	Waldo	3,817
Wiscasset	Lincoln	3,742

== See also ==
- Arrowsic Island
- Birch Point State Park
- Bowdoin College
- Camden Hills State Park
- Damariscotta Lake State Park
- Eagle Island
- Georgetown Island
- Fort Edgecomb
- Fort Knox
- Fort Point State Park
- Fort Popham
- Fort William Henry
- Islesboro Island
- Isle au Haut
- Lake Saint George State Park
- North Haven Island
- Maine Media College
- Matinicus Isle
- Moose Point State Park
- Monhegan Island
- Owls Head Light State Park
- Swan Island
- SMCC Midcoast Campus
- Southport Island
- Reid State Park
- Vinalhaven Island
- Warren Island State Park
- Westport Island
- Whaleback Shell Midden
