= WVOM-FM =

News/talk radio station in Howland–Bangor, Maine

- Howland, Maine; United States
- Broadcast area: Bangor; Central Maine; Downeast Maine
- Frequency: 103.9 MHz
- Branding: VOM, the Voice of Maine

Programming
- Format: Talk
- Network: Fox News Radio
- Affiliations: Premiere Networks

Ownership
- Owner: Blueberry Broadcasting, LLC

History
- First air date: June 1993 (as WSNV)
- Former call signs: WPVM (1989–1992); WPRG (1992–1993); WSNV (1993–1997); WVOM (1997–2013)
- Call sign meaning: Voice of Maine

Technical information
- Licensing authority: FCC
- Facility ID: 4092
- Class: C
- ERP: 90,000 watts
- HAAT: 460 meters (1,510 ft)
- Transmitter coordinates: 45.130°N 68.357°W
- Repeater: 101.3 WVQM (Augusta)

Links
- Public license information: Public file; LMS
- Webcast: Listen live
- Website: www.wvomfm.com

WVOM-FM (103.9 MHz) is a commercial FM radio station licensed to Howland, Maine, and serving Central and Downeast Maine, including Bangor. It airs a talk radio format and is owned by Maine-based Blueberry Broadcasting which is headed by Louis Vitale and Bruce Biette. WVOM-FM is known as "The Voice of Maine".

The studios and offices are located on Target Industrial Circle in Bangor. The transmitter, powered at 90,000 watts, is on a mountaintop near Burlington. WVOM-FM is simulcast on WVQM (101.3 FM) in Augusta, which extends the station's programming to the capital region.

== Programming ==
=== Weekdays ===
WVOM-FM airs a local morning drive information and talk program co-hosted by Ric Tyler. Syndicated conservative talk shows follow, mostly from Premiere Networks. They include The Glenn Beck Radio Program, The Clay Travis and Buck Sexton Show, The Howie Carr Show, The Sean Hannity Show, Ground Zero with Clyde Lewis and Coast to Coast AM with George Noory. Most hours begin with an update from Fox News Radio.

=== Weekend ===
Local shows on weekends include "Hot and Cold with Tom Gocze". It is WVOM's longest running local program and originated in 1989 on then-talk station WZON. It had been co-hosted by Gocze and Dr. Dick Hill, a mechanical engineering professor at the University of Maine for over 46 years. A TV show was also seen on Maine Public Broadcasting Network, after being carried for many years on WVII/WFVX-LD. Gocze and Hill also wrote columns for the Bangor Daily News. In 2008 Hill scaled back his time on the program and later retired.

Other weekend programming includes The Kim Komando Show, The Car Doctor with Ron Ananian, Senior Talk, Financial Safari, Maine View, The Maine Outdoors, Somewhere in Time with Art Bell, the weekend version of Coast to Coast AM and the repeats of weekday shows.

== History ==
A construction permit for an FM station in Howland was granted by the Federal Communications Commission in 1989. The permit carried the call sign WPVM, which was changed to WPRG in 1992; neither call sign would be used on the air.

In June 1993, the station signed on as WSNV. It aired an adult contemporary format and was owned by Bay Communications, Inc.

In 1997, the station was acquired by San Antonio-based Clear Channel Communications (later known as iHeartMedia). Clear Channel switched the format to conservative talk, mostly featuring its own syndicated programs, and using CBS Radio News for world and national coverage.

WVOM and the other 16 Clear Channel stations in Maine were sold in August 2008 to Maine-based Blueberry Broadcasting which is headed by Louis Vitale and Bruce Biette.

=== WVOM AM ===
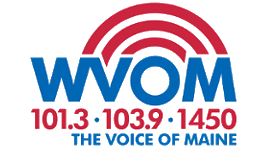
Former logo

WVOM-FM's programming was previously heard on WVOM (AM 1450) and FM translator W236DO (95.1) in Rockland, serving Midcoast Maine.

WRKD started broadcasting in 1952. Its broadcast tower was located between Route 1 North and the Maine State Ferry terminal and (along with the cement plant in Thomaston) was a high visible shore marker.

In the 1970s, WRKD (along with WGAN in Portland and WHDH in Boston) broadcast Boston Red Sox baseball.

As AM radio antennas are directional, WRKD's signal was also useful for navigation in fog before radar, LORANS and GPS.

The license for WVOM AM was surrendered to the FCC and cancelled on July 21, 2022. Translator W236DO's license was surrendered and cancelled on the same day.

== Past programming ==
- "Tom and Charlie Show" was a wake up information program hosted by Tom Morelli and Charlie Horne from 1995 to 2000. Originally carried from 6 to 10 am. Later, when Dr. Laura was moved to the 9 a.m. time slot, the morning show was moved back to 6 to 9 am. Morelli left in June 2000. Horne was let go three years later, after being paired with several other hosts. The live coverage of the Ice Storm of 1998 was the high point of the morning show, and many details of this event were written about in a book.
- "Back To Business" was a program designed to provide advice to Eastern Maine's small business community. The program was hosted by Deb Neuman of the University of Maine's Target Technology Incubator. Neuman was awarded Small Business Journalist of the Year for Maine and New England by the US Small Business Administration. The show also has received a commendation from the United States Senate in September 2006.
- "The Woof Meow Show" was hosted by Don Hanson and Kate Dutra of Green Acres Kennel Shop. The show focused on educating owners about their dogs and cats. Topics in the past have included: Dealing with a Barking Dog, Picking the Perfect Pet, Insurance Issues for Pets, Acupuncture for Pets, Pet Nutrition, Litter Box Training and many others.
- Maine Black Bears Sports (shared with WGUY). WVOM and WGUY were the flagship station for the 2007 & 2008 seasons. WVOM carried football, and hockey while then sister station WGUY carried men's and women's college basketball as well as select baseball and softball games Previous to the fall of 2007, the long-time home of University of Maine sports was ESPN Radio affiliate WZON. However the university's student run radio station WMEB continues to carry home sports games, with their own announcers. With WGUY being sold, and sister station WWBX changing formats to sports, partially simulcasting Boston-based station WEEI, all game broadcasts moved to WWBX starting with the 2008 ice hockey season. WVOM however still carries the coaches interview shows.
- George Hale joined the station in 2004 as morning show co-host. Hale, the lone remaining liberal talk radio host on the station, had been on Maine radio in some form since the 1950s and was 94 years old by the end of his run at the station. In March 2026, Hale was abruptly fired from the station while he was on vacation; Hale stated that he was offered an on-air send-off but refused it.
