= Down East =

Parts of Atlantic Canada and Northeast U.S.

"Down East" or "Downeast" is a term for parts of eastern coastal New England and Canada, particularly the U.S. state of Maine and Canada's Maritime Provinces, an area that closely corresponds to the historical French territory of Acadia. The phrase apparently derives from sailing terminology: sailors from western ports sailed downwind toward the east to reach the area.

A person from this area may be called a "down-easter." Within Maine, the phrase may refer specifically to the state's easternmost regions, also called Downeast Maine.

The Downeast Maine National Heritage Area was established in the National Heritage Area Act in 2022. The National Heritage Area will help preserve more historic and cultural sites in Hancock and Washington counties.

== Etymology ==
The origin of the phrase "Downeast" is typically traced to nautical terminology referring to direction, rather than location. In the warm months most suitable for sailing, the prevailing winds along the coast of New England and Canada blow from the southwest, meaning ships sail downwind to go east. As such, the northeastern stretches were said to be "Downeast" in relation to major western cities such as Boston. Correspondingly, sailors spoke of going "up to Boston" from Downeast ports, a phrase still common in Maine, despite the fact that Boston is around fifty miles to the south of Maine. The term can be used as an adverb, adjective, or noun. The Oxford English Dictionary traces the earliest known use in print to 1825. The phrase "down-easter", meaning a person from "Downeast", appeared in print in 1828.

== Uses ==
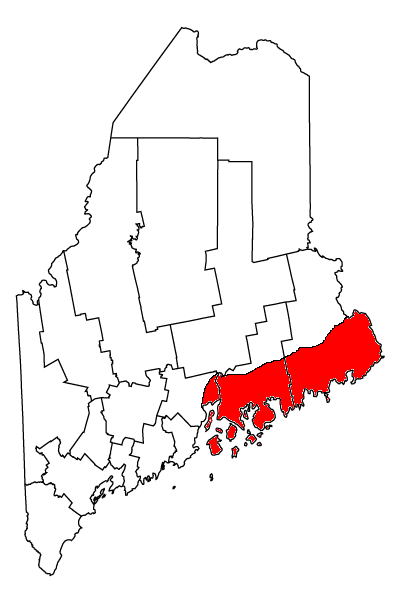
Downeast Maine

The phrase "Downeast" is used in several ways. Most broadly, it refers to areas from northeastern New England into Canada's Maritime Provinces. Sargent F. Collier wrote that Downeast extended from Maine into Canada as far as Chaleur Bay. This area is similar to the boundaries of the historical French colony of Acadia; Collier regarded this as a cultural legacy of the former colony. According to Maine author John Gould, Downeast is "a never-never land always east of where you are". The term is relational, with Boston being the traditional referent for determining what is "Downeast". As such, sailors going from one port in Maine to another nearby may have said they were going "down Maine" or "east'ard", reserving "Downeast" for farther points.

Within New England, "Downeast" often refers specifically to Maine, especially the coastal areas. The phrase has widespread use in the state; Maine's largest monthly magazine is titled Down East. Amtrak named its passenger train service between Boston and Brunswick, Maine the Downeaster. The term "Downeast" provided the name for a prominent type of sailing ship developed in Maine in the later 19th century, the Downeaster. Downeasters were a modification of the earlier clipper, with new lines and rigging enabling it to carry substantially more cargo. Primarily used to transport wheat and other goods from California to European markets, Downeasters were characteristically built in Maine, and their captains often came from the state. A significant part of Maine's maritime legacy, they were among the last prominent sailing ships built before steamships came to dominate the industry. While steamships may have supplanted sailing ships in some contexts, this prominence just before the decline led Maine boatbuilders to remain in demand for sailing yachts and motor yachts; a common modern design influenced by coastal Maine's ubiquitous lobster boats is made by several manufacturers under names resembling 'Downeaster'.

In Maine, "Downeast" may refer more narrowly to the easternmost section of the state along the Canada–US border. This area, also known as "Downeast Maine" or "Downeast Maine", lies on the coast roughly between the Penobscot River and the border, including rural Hancock and Washington counties and the towns of Deer Isle, Bar Harbor, Machias, Jonesport, and Eastport. This was among the last parts of the state settled by Europeans. Due to its thankless climate it saw little settlement by the French, and British colonists arrived only after French control ended in 1763. Initially attracted by the availability of land for farming, the early British settlers soon turned to fishing to survive; fishing remains a significant economic driver. Largely due to its inhospitable climate and remoteness, Downeast Maine remained one of the state's least developed areas throughout the 20th century. In more recent years, Downeast Maine and the Greater Portland area have emerged as an important center for the creative economy, which is also bringing gentrification.

In Canada, "Down East", often written as two words, refers to the Maritime Provinces: New Brunswick, Nova Scotia, and Prince Edward Island. Newfoundland and the Gaspé Peninsula of Quebec are sometimes included. The term gave its name to Down East fiddling, which developed in the Maritimes and has become one of the most prominent styles of Canadian fiddling. The style is closely associated with New Brunswick native Don Messer, who hosted a radio show on Prince Edward Island beginning in 1939 and had a wide influence over fiddle music in Canada. The Down East style is distinguished by simple playing and dance-ready rhythms. In Thunder Bay and Northwestern Ontario, "down east" refers to southern Ontario.
