= WCKD-LP =

Television station in Bangor–Dedham, Maine (1994–2021)

- Bangor–Dedham, Maine; United States
- Channels: Analog: 30 (UHF)

Programming
- Affiliations: PBS (1994–2001); UPN (2001–2003); Fox (secondary, 2001–2003); Pax TV (via WBGR-LP, 2003–2005); Jewelry Television (2005–2006); TBN (2006–2007); JUCE TV (2007–2020); Positiv (2020–2021)

Ownership
- Owner: Western Family Television, Inc.

History
- First air date: April 16, 1994
- Last air date: July 13, 2021 (27 years, 88 days) (License canceled August 4, 2021)
- Former call signs: W30BF (1994–2001)
- Call sign meaning: Wicked Good Television

Technical information
- Licensing authority: FCC
- Facility ID: 39663
- ERP: 33.7 kW
- Transmitter coordinates: 44°40′39.00″N 68°45′13.00″W

Links
- Public license information: LMS

WCKD-LP (channel 30) was a low-power television station licensed to both Bangor and Dedham, Maine, United States. Its signal originated from a transmitter in East Eddington, Maine.

== History ==
WCKD-LP went on the air April 16, 1994, as W30BF, carrying PBS programming as part of Maine Public Television Plus, the state's secondary public television network. Cuts in federal funding led to the elimination of MPT Plus on June 30, 1996; W30BF then became a repeater of Maine Public Television's primary service until 1999, when James McLeod, owner of Pax affiliate WBGR-LP (channel 33), bought the station. McLeod was not able to put enough resources into the station, however, and in late 2000 he signed a local marketing agreement with Rockfleet Broadcasting, owner of ABC affiliate WVII-TV (channel 7), who relaunched the station in February 2001 as WCKD-LP, a UPN affiliate that also carried Fox Sports telecasts. Previously, Bangor viewers received UPN on cable via Boston's WSBK-TV. WCKD's schedule also included a 10 p.m. newscast produced by WVII.

WCKD-LP announced in September 2001 that it would become a full Fox affiliate that October, after WPXT in Portland (which had long been carried on Bangor cable) announced that it would switch to The WB. However, UPN informed the station that it not only could not drop the network before the expiration of its contract in December 2005, but that WCKD-LP was not allowed to preempt UPN programming for Fox Sports' weeknight telecasts; as a result, on October 7, the same day that WPXT switched affiliations, Adelphia Communications replaced WCKD-LP with Foxnet, though the station was reinstated (with Foxnet moving to another channel) a month later. During this period, UPN programming remained available on Adelphia via WSBK, which it had continued to carry. Although WCKD-LP remained with UPN, its association with Fox Sports also continued, allowing the station to air Super Bowl XXXVI.

After Rockfleet Broadcasting acquired W22BU (channel 22) from MS Communications in 2003, it changed that station's call letters to WFVX-LP and, on April 13, affiliated it with Fox. WFVX then inherited WCKD-LP's cable carriage and its syndicated and local programming (which by this time also included a morning talk show, So Goes the Nation, in addition to the 10 p.m. newscast; for brief period, So Goes the Nation was simulcast on both stations), forcing the station to air Pax programming (shared with WBGR-LP) outside of UPN's programming hours. Control of WCKD-LP reverted to James McLeod in August 2003, after WVII ended its local marketing agreement with the station; for a time afterward, WCKD-LP served as a temporary simulcast of WBGR. These moves again made WSBK-TV the default UPN affiliate on Adelphia's Bangor systems. WCKD-LP eventually became a Jewelry Television affiliate. In 2006, the station became a TBN affiliate, even though TBN already owned a repeater (W36CK) in the market.

In 2007, James McLeod sold WCKD-LP to Western Family Television. Soon afterward, the station joined one of TBN's sister networks, JCTV (which Western Family affiliates most of its stations with). JCTV rebranded as JUCE TV on January 1, 2014.

WCKD-LP's license was canceled by the Federal Communications Commission (FCC) on August 4, 2021, due to the station not obtaining a license to convert to digital operations by the July 13 deadline.
