= WAGM-TV =

Television station in Presque Isle, Maine

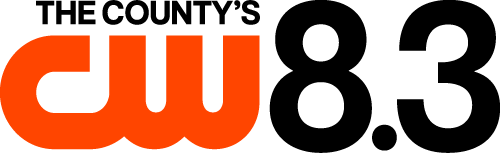
- Presque Isle, Maine; United States
- Channels: Digital: 8 (VHF); Virtual: 8
- Branding: WAGM 8; NewsSource 8; WAGM Fox 8 (8.2); The County's CW 8.3

Programming
- Affiliations: 8.1: CBS; 8.2: Fox; 8.3: CW+

Ownership
- Owner: Gray Media; (Gray Television Licensee, LLC)
- Sister stations: WWPI-CD

History
- First air date: October 13, 1956
- Former channel numbers: Analog: 8 (VHF, 1956–2009); Digital: 16 (UHF, 2003–2009)
- Former affiliations: NBC (primary 1957–1959, secondary 1959–2005); ABC (secondary, 1957–1998); Fox (secondary, 1994–1998); UPN (secondary, 1995–2006)
- Call sign meaning: Aroostook Garden of Maine

Technical information
- Licensing authority: FCC
- Facility ID: 48305
- ERP: 10 kW
- HAAT: 350 m (1,148 ft)
- Transmitter coordinates: 46°33′4.1″N 67°48′32″W

Links
- Public license information: Public file; LMS
- Website: www.wagmtv.com; "The County's CW 8.3"

WAGM-TV (channel 8) is a television station in Presque Isle, Maine, United States, affiliated with CBS, Fox, and The CW Plus. It is owned by Gray Media alongside Fort Kent–licensed low-power, Class A NBC affiliate WWPI-CD (channel 16). The two stations share studios on Brewer Road in Presque Isle; WAGM-TV's transmitter is located on the northern section of Mars Hill Mountain among the wind turbines.

WAGM-TV has been the only full-power commercial television station transmitting in Northeast Maine since the station was founded in 1956.

== History ==
=== Early years ===
Ground was broken on the $250,000 facility in June 1956. WAGM-TV signed on October 13, 1956, on VHF channel 8. It was a CBS affiliate owned by Harold Glidden and the Aroostook Broadcasting Corporation along with WAGM radio (then at 1450 AM; later at 950 AM). The transmitter was behind the station's Brewer Road studios, providing a coverage area limited to the immediate area including Presque Isle and Caribou. In 1957, Glidden sold Aroostook Broadcasting to Community Broadcasting System, a company controlled by former Governor Horace Hildreth, who also owned WABI-AM-TV in Bangor.

Soon afterward, the station changed its primary affiliation to NBC, matching WABI-TV; however, WAGM-TV maintained secondary affiliations with CBS and ABC. It returned to being a primary CBS affiliate, again following WABI's lead, in 1959. However, in practice, as an affiliate of all the big three networks, WAGM cherry-picked the most popular programs for its prime time lineup.

Community Broadcasting Service merged with Journal Publications in 1971 to form Diversified Communications. WAGM radio was sold in 1981 and renamed WKZX; it went silent by 1991. The radio station's building remained abandoned for years. As of 2023, it no longer exists. Meanwhile, the three transmitter towers nearby were dismantled sometime in the early 1990s. In 1984, Diversified Communications sold WAGM-TV to NEP Communications, then-owner of WNEP-TV in Scranton, Pennsylvania. NEP sold WNEP to The New York Times Company a year later, but retained WAGM under the licensee name NEPSK, Inc. At one point co-owned by Tom Shelburne, Peter Kozloski, and Norman Johnston, Kozloski assumed full ownership of the station in 1991, retaining the NEPSK name.

=== Changes ===
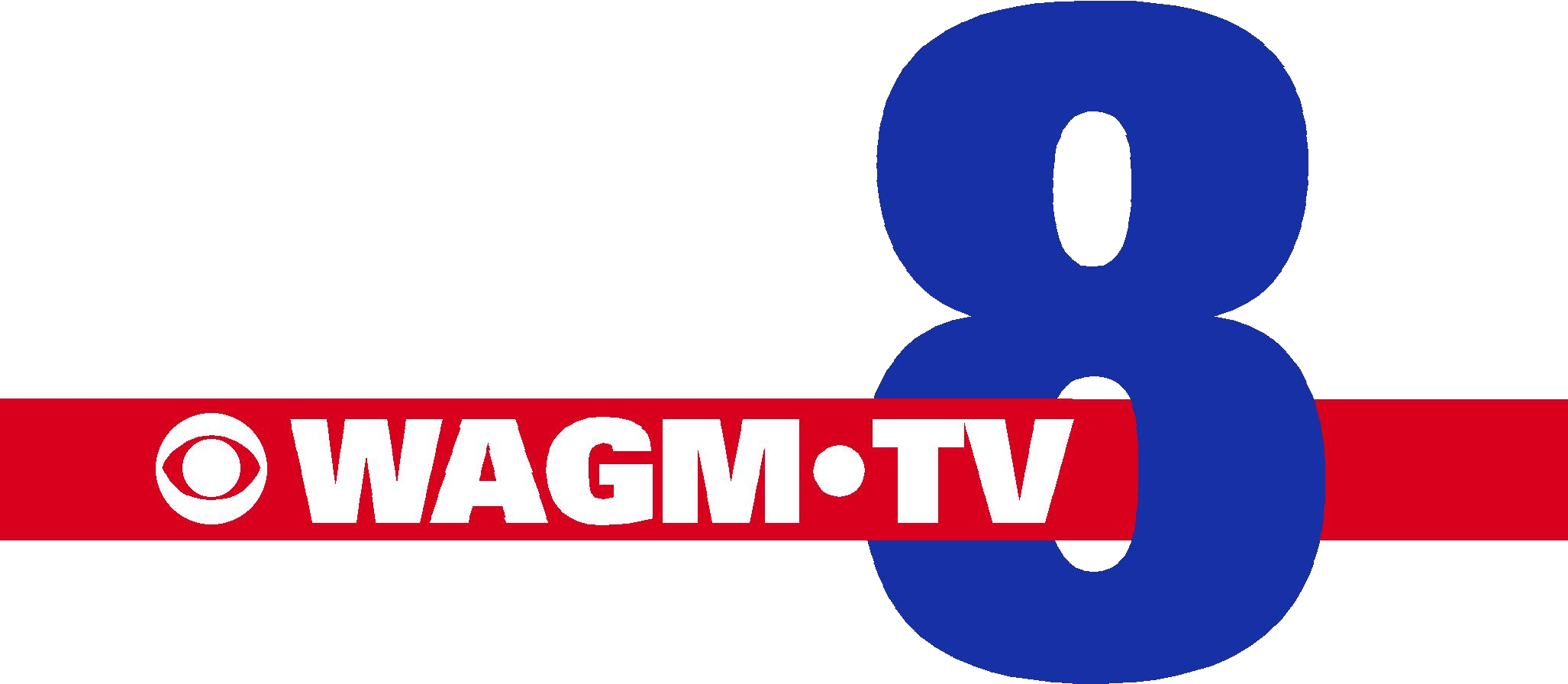
Logo used between 2000 and 2012; even though the station still aired some NBC programming through 2005 and UPN programming through 2006, the logo only featured the CBS eye.

Around the same time as the sale to NEP, WAGM began phasing out its secondary affiliations with ABC and NBC. Given increasing availability of cable and satellite television in rural Aroostook County, the necessity to carry programming from multiple networks decreased. Many stations over the Canadian border in New Brunswick also serve Aroostook County. By 1990, WAGM carried the entire CBS prime time lineup, with other network programs airing nightly between 7 and 8. The station dropped ABC completely in 1998, while the last NBC show seen on the station, Days of Our Lives, disappeared from the schedule in September 2005. The end of the ABC and NBC affiliations left KXGN-TV in Glendive, Montana, as the last television station in the United States affiliated with more than one big three network on a single feed (that station, formerly a dual CBS/NBC affiliate, moved NBC to a digital subchannel in September 2009). Today, WVII-TV from Bangor serves as the de facto ABC affiliate on Charter Spectrum's Presque Isle system; until the launch of WWPI-LD in 2020, WLBZ served the same function for NBC.

When Fox gained broadcasting rights to games from the NFL's National Football Conference in 1994, WAGM aired them since Fox did not have an affiliate in Presque Isle; this made it the only station in the United States to air programs from all four major networks at the same time. The arrangement ended when CBS obtained the American Football Conference contract in 1998; as a result, Fox programming was provided to the Presque Isle area via Foxnet, and it remained that way until September 2006. WAGM also aired some UPN programming during late nights and weekends from 1995 until 2006 when that network closed and merged with The WB to form The CW.

The station moved its transmitter site in 1999 to the summit of Big Rock ski resort on Mars Hill Mountain's southwestern face. The move placed the antenna at a much higher point greatly improving reception of the signal. This location is where its first digital signal on UHF channel 16 signed on from in July 2003. This conflicts with an official statement made in 2006 by WAGM, which stated it launched its digital signal in April 2002. For the U.S. digital transition on June 12, 2009, WAGM applied for a 10 kilowatt digital signal and moved its transmitter to the northern section of Mars Hill Mountain. At midnight on June 12, it signed off the analog channel 8 and digital channel 16 signals for the final time. The next day, the station signed on a new, more powerful digital signal on channel 8.

WAGM is seen across Western New Brunswick in Canada and can be picked up over-the-air a few miles outside of Fredericton city limits in communities such as Keswick Ridge. On cable, it was seen throughout Northwestern New Brunswick towns such as Woodstock, Grand Falls, and Edmundston, until Rogers Cable dropped the channel on May 15, 2025. The station was available to a greater extent in Canada such as in Fredericton until the advent of satellite-delivered American broadcast stations on Cancom in the early-1990s.

=== Sale to Gray Television ===
In April 2015, WAGM was sold to Gray Television for $10.25 million. The transaction closed on July 1, 2015, following FCC approval. WAGM was Gray's first television station in the Northeastern United States.

In February 2017, Gray announced that it would purchase Bangor's WABI-TV from Diversified Communications with the transaction expected to close in the second quarter of 2017 pending FCC approval. The purchase would reunite WAGM with its former co-owned station, and in the press release from Gray announcing the purchase it was stated that the two stations would share newsgathering and other resources.

== Subchannel history ==
=== WAGM-DT2 ===
WAGM-DT2 is the Fox-affiliated second digital subchannel of WAGM-TV, broadcasting in high definition on channel 8.2.

On September 12, 2006, WAGM launched a Fox affiliate on its primary digital channel, 8.1, preceding the shutdown of Foxnet. Prior to then, outside of the station's secondary Fox affiliation during the mid-1990s, Foxnet provided the state's only access to Fox on cable outside of the Portland and Bangor areas; the subchannel's launch coincided with the shutdown of Foxnet (which served as the Fox affiliate for the entire state of Maine between late 2001 and April 2003). Foxnet was originally scheduled to cease operations on September 1, but the shutdown was postponed to allow WAGM time to set up the service. The change resulted in the main CBS signal moving to a new second subchannel, 8.2. Such a placement is generally uncommon as most broadcasters number a digital signal equivalent to the analog signal as minor channel 1 and number other subchannels with higher minor channel numbers. This is a similar situation as NBC affiliate WGBC in Meridian, Mississippi, which moved its original NBC affiliation to a new second digital subchannel so its main channel could join Fox and the Retro Television Network (RTV). Despite this, the CBS feed was still the main signal, as it was the only one broadcast in HD, and the one that continued to be available on analog TV until its end in 2009.

Until Time Warner Cable switched to WAGM's relocated CBS feed, it offered Fox in high definition for a short time on digital channel 508. On November 15, 2007, WAGM created a new separate website for its Fox channel featuring the "My Fox" format and layout from Fox Interactive Media. However, the web address "myfoxaroostook.com" was eventually abandoned.

By fall 2017, the over-the-air feed of "WAGM Fox 8" had begun airing in Fox's recommended 720p HD resolution; the Fox subchannel had only been carried in high definition on cable prior to then. In addition to its over-the-air resolution upgrade, WAGM Fox 8 had also been moved to the station's second digital subchannel while CBS programming was returned to its original position on WAGM's main channel.

=== WAGM-DT3 ===
WAGM-DT3 (branded as The County's CW 8.3, in reference to the large Aroostook County containing most of WAGM's coverage area) is the CW-affiliated third digital subchannel of WAGM-TV, broadcasting in 16:9 widescreen standard definition on channel 8.3. All programming on WAGM-DT3 is received through The CW's programming feed for smaller media markets, The CW Plus, which provides a set schedule of syndicated programming acquired by The CW for broadcast during time periods outside of the network's regular programming hours; however, Gray Television handles local advertising and promotional services for the subchannel. WAGM-DT3 was launched on September 10, 2018, and is carried locally on Spectrum channel 13 in SD, and in high definition on channel 1212. Presently, the HD feed is exclusive to cable due to WAGM's current multiplexer limitations.

"WBPQ"'s WB-era logo.

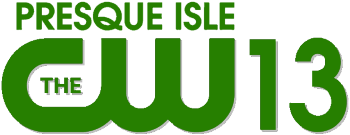
"Presque Isle CW" logo, prior to the affiliation moving to WAGM's third subchannel.

Previously, the CW affiliation in the market was available through a cable-only channel operated by Spectrum and the forerunner providers in the market, which carried the station on cable channel 13 since 1998, when it launched as a WB affiliate with the WB 100+ service (then branded as "Presque Isle's WB") under the unofficial callsign "WBPQ" (which stood for The WB Presque Isle) for the purposes of identification in electronic program guides and Nielsen ratings tabulation. Throughout its twenty years as a cable channel, it only ran in standard definition. It seamlessly became associated with the new CW network (branded as "Presque Isle CW", though it used a "CW 13" logo) on September 18, 2006, after the merger of The WB and UPN into that one network. Following this CW affiliate's September 10, 2018, debut over the new WAGM-DT3 subchannel, it updated its branding to "The County's CW 8.3" to reflect its new over-the-air presence.

== Programming ==
WAGM-TV airs the complete CBS schedule; until 2013, the station signed off every night and thus did not show CBS News Up to the Minute. During the fall potato harvest (potatoes being the most important industry in the region), the annual Potato Picker's Special is aired weekdays at 5 a.m. for approximately three weeks beginning in September. The program announces details from area farmers regarding the harvest and has been airing on either radio or television for over 50 years.

=== News operation ===
WAGM's NewsSource 8 broadcasts have routinely ranked as the highest-rated local newscasts in the United States based on Nielsen market share. The station serves a large area but its primary market is Aroostook County which is about the size of Connecticut and Rhode Island combined. Given the station's transmitter location in close proximity to Canada, it also covers news and weather in Western New Brunswick.

The small market nature of WAGM tends to result in a high employee turnover rate with most personalities staying at the station for only a year or two before moving on to a larger market. Nevertheless, a few personnel remained with WAGM for more than a few years such as former assistant news director and sports director Rene Cloukey. Cloukey retired from the station in November 2024, after 40 years of covering Aroostook County sports. Another long-lasting employee no longer with the station is station manager and news director Jon Gulliver who recently came back to the station on a part-time basis helping with sports as well as former News Director Sue Bernard. Former chief meteorologist Ted Shapiro had been with WAGM since being ousted from Bangor's WVII when that station axed its weather department and outsourced forecasting segments to AccuWeather in State College, Pennsylvania. Ironically, WAGM used some of that company's CinemaLive weather graphics system in its own forecast segments, until it switched to The Weather Company's MAX Graphics software in 2016. Shapiro left WAGM in 2021.

With the September 12, 2006, launch of Fox on its main channel came a new prime time weeknight newscast known as NewsSource 8 at 10. This program closely mirrors local news seen on the CBS channel. On April 11, 2009, due to a decrease in sponsorship, increased preemptions from network sports coverage, and financial reasons, WAGM stopped airing a Saturday night newscast at 6. In late-September 2010, NewsSource 8: The Saturday Edition was brought back to air on the Fox channel with occasional airings on the CBS channel if preempted. In addition, the prime time newscast at 10 was expanded to Saturday nights at that point in time. With the launch of Fox College Football's prime time games in 2012, the Saturday newscast was discontinued.

On August 23, 2010, WAGM renovated its news and weather set but kept the same music theme and graphics package. Unlike most CBS affiliates, WAGM does not air a newscast weeknights at 5. When the Fox channel first launched, it replayed the morning broadcast originally at 8 a.m. This was eventually moved to 9 a.m. and then dropped altogether at some point.

In November 2024, Gray Media eliminated the station's locally produced weekday morning newscast, in favor of simulcasting the morning newscast from WABI in Bangor. The other newscasts on WAGM would remain produced in Presque Isle.

== Technical information ==
=== Subchannels ===
The station's signal is multiplexed:

Subchannels of WAGM-TV
Subchannel	Res.	Short name	Programming
8.1	1080i	WAGM-HD	CBS
8.2	720p	WAGMFOX	Fox
8.3	480i	WAGMCW	The CW Plus

=== Former translators ===
A translator signal, W16DA-D in Fort Kent, changed its call letters to WWPI-LD on June 3, 2019, after Gray Television filed with the FCC on May 21 for a construction permit to move the translator's city of license from Fort Kent to Presque Isle (the FCC granted that CP on August 7). WWPI-LD then fell silent and returned to the air January 7, 2020, as an NBC affiliate.

A second translator, W02AU-D (channel 2) in St. Francis, used to transmit from the north of Back Settlement and was licensed to the St. Francis Chamber of Commerce; however, on June 4, 2016, the FCC deleted W02AU-D from its database.

A third translator, W11AY-D (channel 11) in St. John Plantation was licensed to the Town of St. John; however, on January 11, 2023, the FCC cancelled W11AY-D's license.
