= WVII-TV =

Television station in Bangor, Maine

- Bangor, Maine; United States
- Channels: Digital: 7 (VHF), shared with WFVX-LD; Virtual: 7
- Branding: ABC 7

Programming
- Affiliations: 7.1: ABC; 7.3: MovieSphere Gold

Ownership
- Owner: Rockfleet Broadcasting; (Bangor Communications, LLC)
- Sister stations: WFVX-LD

History
- First air date: October 15, 1965
- Former call signs: WEMT (1965–1976)
- Former channel numbers: Analog: 7 (VHF, 1965–2009); Digital: 14 (UHF, 2002–2009)
- Former affiliations: Fox (secondary, 1990s)
- Call sign meaning: "VII" is 7 in Roman numerals

Technical information
- Licensing authority: FCC
- Facility ID: 3667
- ERP: 14 kW
- HAAT: 229 m (751 ft)
- Transmitter coordinates: 44°45′35.2″N 68°33′59.1″W

Links
- Public license information: Public file; LMS
- Website: www.foxbangor.com

WVII-TV (channel 7) is a television station in Bangor, Maine, United States, affiliated with ABC. The station is owned by Rockfleet Broadcasting alongside Fox affiliate WFVX-LD (channel 22). WVII-TV and WFVX-LD share studios on Target Industrial Circle in West Bangor; through a channel sharing agreement, the two stations transmit using WVII-TV's spectrum from an antenna on Black Cap Mountain along the Penobscot and Hancock county line.

WVII-TV serves as the default ABC affiliate through cable for the Presque Isle market, as that area does not have an ABC affiliate of its own. It is carried in the local tier of Charter Spectrum's cable system in Presque Isle, and is also offered as the ABC affiliate in the Presque Isle Dish Network and DirecTV channel lineups.

== History ==
The station signed on October 15, 1965, as WEMT under the ownership of Downeast Television, an ownership group that included Melvin Stone, owner of WGUY (1250 AM) and Rumford's WRUM, and Herbert Hoffman, owner of WBOS-AM-FM in Boston. Until WEMT went on the air, ABC maintained secondary affiliations with CBS affiliate WABI-TV (channel 5) and NBC affiliate WLBZ-TV (channel 2). Channel 7 is the only television station in Bangor to have never switched its network affiliation. Downeast sold WEMT to Eastern Maine Broadcasting Systems (a subsidiary of Valley Communications, owner of WPNO in Auburn and WSKW and WTOS-FM in Skowhegan) on February 2, 1976. The new owners changed the station's call letters to WVII-TV that September. Although ABC was the nation's number one network by that time, Eastern Maine Broadcasting Systems suffered from massive financial problems during its ownership of WVII, bouncing paychecks, relying on an outdated Super 8mm film camera to film stories and lacking basic amenities such as air conditioning; the station went unnoticed in Bangor during this time. WVII did see some success as a border blaster when viewers in Halifax, Nova Scotia, discovered the station's late-night offering, Dick Stacey's Country Jamboree. Eastern Maine Broadcasting Systems sold the station to Seaway Communications, a minority-controlled company that already owned WAEO-TV in Rhinelander, Wisconsin, on July 23, 1982.

WVII suffered a transmitter failure on February 9, 1995, due to a fire, knocking the station off the air in the middle of the 6 p.m. news, during a Bangor Hydro Electric advertisement. The following day, TCI Cable, whose facilities shared a real property line with WVII on Target Industrial Circle, ran a transmission line from its building to the WVII studios, allowing the station to resume normal operations for Bangor cable viewers; however, until a temporary transmitter was activated on February 19, cable systems in areas outside of Bangor were forced to carry distant affiliates for programming (WVII was supplemented by WMTW in the Augusta and Waterville areas (which are considered to be part of the Portland area), while Miami affiliate WPLG was carried in the Presque Isle market in place of WVII) and over-the-air viewers outside of the Bangor market's extreme western fringes lost ABC programming completely during that time. WVII would not return to full-power broadcasting until April 1995; at that time, it became the second station in Bangor to broadcast in stereo. The cause of the fire was determined by the station's chief engineer to have been a snake crawling into the final on the transmitter causing an electrical short.

Seaway Broadcasting merged with Rockfleet Broadcasting in 1998. Under Rockfleet, WVII ventured into low-power broadcasting in Bangor; it signed a local marketing agreement with James McLeod, owner of W30BF (the former Bangor transmitter for Maine Public Television Plus) and WBGR-LP (channel 33), in 2000, and relaunched channel 30 as UPN affiliate WCKD-LP, which also carried some Fox Sports programming (in the 1990s, WVII itself carried some sports programming from Fox on a secondary basis), in 2001. WCKD tried to become a full Fox affiliate that October after Portland's WPXT announced that it would switch to The WB, but was blocked from doing so by UPN; this did not stop the station from continuing its existing relationship with Fox Sports. As a result, from October 2001 to April 2003, Fox's prime time and children's programming in the Bangor and Portland areas was carried by Foxnet, which served as the network's affiliate for the entire state of Maine during that time. After Rockfleet Broadcasting acquired W22BU (channel 22) from MS Communications in 2003, it changed that station's call letters to WFVX-LP and, on April 13, affiliated it with Fox. Rockfleet moved all of WCKD's syndicated and local programming, but not the UPN affiliation, to WFVX. That August, Rockfleet and James McLeod agreed to end the LMA with WCKD.

WVII made national news in a New York Times article on October 30, 2006, quoting General Manager Michael Palmer saying "when Bar Harbor is underwater, then we can do global warming stories. Until then," he added, "no more." According to Palmer, this policy, implemented the preceding summer, was introduced because: "a) we do local news, b) the issue evolved from hard science into hard politics and c) despite what you may have heard from the mainstream media, this science is far from conclusive." In an e-mail message to the station's operations manager, a news anchor, and a news reporter, Palmer placed "global warming stories in the same category as 'the killer African bee scare' from the 1970s or, more recently, the Y2K scare when everyone's computer was going to self-destruct." Palmer eventually told the Bangor Daily News that the e-mail was in response to an "overtly political" report from a former reporter and that the station did not intend to stop reporting on global warming altogether; on the following night's newscast, WVII broadcast a report in which residents were asked if they felt global temperatures were rising "so we could immediately dispel the rumor".

In August 2008, WVII and WFVX began to split live coverage of New England Patriots pre-season games. Channel 7 had previously shown the games in 1995 and since 2001; however, National Football League rules required WVII to show them on tape delay, despite several efforts by the station to carry live telecasts.

WVII has been digital-only since February 17, 2009, the original date when all television stations in the United States transitioned from analog broadcasts to digital broadcasts under federal mandate (the date would later change to June 12, 2009). Initially, the digital signal remained on UHF channel 14 (where it broadcast before the transition), but it subsequently returned to its former analog channel, 7.

The station received national attention when the station's main anchor team, Cindy Michaels (who also acted as WVII/WFVX's news director) and Tony Consiglio (who also doubled as executive producer), resigned their positions on-air at the end of the 6 p.m. newscast on November 20, 2012; effective immediately. Michaels and Consiglio later told the Bangor Daily News and other media outlets that they felt compelled to resign due to conflicts with upper management of both the station and Rockfleet. They claimed that management interfered with the news department so much that in the end, it was impossible to present balanced newscasts. They took the step of resigning on-air because they wanted a chance to say goodbye to their viewers. They were replaced by former WABI-TV and WQCB radio news anchor Craig Colson, who also became news director for WVII and WFVX, in December 2012.

In June 2013, WVII and WFVX reached a deal to carry Husson University sports. This was followed a month later with a deal to carry University of Maine sports; as a result, WVII and WFVX replaced WABI-TV as the television flagship of the Black Bear Sports Network. As part of the deal, Black Bear sports telecasts are also seen on Stadium College Sports, and production is handled by Pack Network (WABI had produced its telecasts in-house).

In early September 2017, WVII replaced their long-time version of the commonly used Circle 7 logo from ABC (used among their channel 7 stations) with a different logo variation made up of a block number "7".

On February 28, 2022, WVII and WFVX temporarily changed their logos to blue and yellow, the colors of the Ukrainian flag, in support of Ukraine after the 2022 Russian invasion.

In July 2023, a WVII employee was indicted on felony theft charges. According to District Attorney Chris Almy, Melissa Moran, the former accounts manager for WVII/WFVX, stole more than $200,000 from the station over a period of two years.

== News operation ==
WVII has spent most of its history as a distant third place in the Nielsen ratings behind WABI and WLBZ, at point in its early existence not registering any measurable or identifiable audience in one of the smallest media markets in the U.S. Since the early 2010s, it is quickly catching up with WLBZ in the Eastern Maine market. Its news operation is quite small compared to its rivals. The station produces newscasts at 6 a.m. (on WVII), 7 a.m. (on WFVX), noon, 6 p.m., 6:30 and 10 p.m. (on WFVX), and 11 p.m. WVII's website offers on-demand video of its newscasts.

Unlike most ABC affiliates, WVII does not air weeknight newscasts at 5 and/or 5:30, though it did produce a 5:30 newscast until August 1998. It currently does not air weekend newscasts; the 6 p.m. edition ended in September 1998, and the 11 p.m. show was dropped in July 2003. However, WFVX began airing a weekend 10 p.m. newscast in September 2012. The station also ended its 6:30 a.m. newscast on October 1, 1998, though it returned on September 7, 2011. WVII also attempted a noon newscast during the 1990s. On February 4, 2016, WVII brought back a noon newscast.

WVII operated its own weather department during the 20th century, serving as an entry-level opening for aspiring television meteorologists. On October 1, 2002, the station contracted out its forecasts to AccuWeather. The segments were recorded in advance with rotating meteorologists and fed via satellite to Bangor from AccuWeather's headquarters in State College, Pennsylvania (which WVII occasionally refers to as the "ABC 7 Weather Center"). Weekend forecasts started being produced by co-owned WJFW in Wisconsin in 2018, followed by weekday newscasts on January 1, 2020.

WVII began taping the 10 and 11 p.m. newscasts earlier in the evening on October 16, 2006, though the sports report was still seen live on Fridays so that game highlights and scores from high school football games could still be featured. As of September 2011, WFVX has resumed airing a live newscast at 10.

When providing regional and state coverage, WVII and CBS affiliate WGME-TV in Portland share content and video footage. During the summer months, the station periodically airs its early evening news at 6 on Fridays from a town selected in advance. These newscasts are known as ABC 7 News on the Road, and include features about the town where the show is being broadcast from.

In December 2012, WVII and WFVX converted to high definition. A new website, studio and HD graphics were also added during this transition.

=== Notable former on-air staff ===
- Jim Axelrod – reporter (1989)
- Pete Bouchard – meteorologist (1994–1998)

== Subchannels ==
Subchannels of WVII-TV and WFVX-LD
License	Channel	Res.	Short name	Programming
WVII-TV	7.1	720p	WVII-DT	ABC
WVII-TV	7.3	720p	MovieSP	MovieSphere Gold
WFVX-LD	7.2	720p	WFVX	Fox & MyNetworkTV

== See also ==
- Channel 7 digital TV stations in the United States
- Channel 7 virtual TV stations in the United States
- WFQX-TV/WFUP
