= WWPI-CD =

Television station in Fort Kent, Maine

- Fort Kent–Presque Isle, Maine; United States
- City: Fort Kent, Maine
- Channels: Digital: 16 (UHF); Virtual: 16
- Branding: WWPI 16

Programming
- Affiliations: 16.1: NBC

Ownership
- Owner: Gray Media; (Gray Television Licensee, LLC)
- Sister stations: WAGM-TV

History
- First air date: January 7, 2020
- Former call signs: WWPI-LD (2020–2025)
- Call sign meaning: Presque Isle

Technical information
- Licensing authority: FCC
- Facility ID: 181585
- Class: CD
- ERP: 4.1 kW
- HAAT: 52.6 m (173 ft)
- Transmitter coordinates: 46°43′43.0″N 68°00′1.0″W

Links
- Public license information: Public file; LMS
- Website: wagmtv.com

WWPI-CD (channel 16) is a low-power, Class A television station licensed to Fort Kent, Maine, United States, serving the Presque Isle area as an affiliate of NBC. It is owned by Gray Media alongside CBS/Fox/CW+ affiliate WAGM-TV (channel 8). The two stations share studios on Brewer Road in Presque Isle, where WWPI-CD's transmitter is also located.

WWPI-CD is the only NBC affiliate in Maine not tied in with the Tegna-owned News Center Maine network (consisting of WCSH in Portland and WLBZ in Bangor). Prior to WWPI's sign-on as an NBC affiliate, WLBZ served as the default affiliate for Aroostook County.

== History ==
On June 3, 2019, Gray Television changed the call letters of W16DA-D in Fort Kent, previously a translator of WAGM-TV, to WWPI-LD, after having filed with the FCC on May 21 for a construction permit to move the translator's city of license from Fort Kent to Presque Isle (the FCC granted that CP on August 7); WWPI-LD then fell silent. On June 24, 2019, Gray announced that WWPI-LD would be converted into an NBC affiliate by the end of 2019; however, this was delayed pending completion of the station's new transmitter. The station officially signed-on January 7, 2020, which leaves ABC as the only network to not have an over-the-air affiliate in Presque Isle; that network's programming is carried on cable via WVII-TV from the adjacent Bangor market.

== News operation ==
WWPI-CD mostly simulcasts all of WAGM-TV's weekday newscasts, airing the 6 p.m. newscast an hour later at 7 p.m. WWPI-CD does not air newscasts on weekends, opting for syndicated programming.

== Subchannel ==
Subchannel of WWPI-CD
Channel	Res.	Short name	Programming
16.1	1080i	WWPINBC	NBC
