= WABI-TV =

Television station in Bangor, Maine

- Bangor, Maine; United States
- Channels: Digital: 13 (VHF); Virtual: 5
- Branding: WABI-TV 5; Eastern and Central Maine's CW (5.2)

Programming
- Affiliations: 5.1: CBS; 5.2: CW+; for others, see § Subchannels

Ownership
- Owner: Gray Media; (Gray Television Licensee, LLC)

History
- First air date: January 25, 1953
- Former channel numbers: Analog: 5 (VHF, 1953–2009); Digital: 19 (UHF, 2002–2010); Translator: W61AO Calais
- Former affiliations: NBC (1953–1959); CBS (secondary, 1953–1955); DuMont (secondary, 1953–1955); ABC (secondary, 1953–1965); NTA (secondary, 1956–1961)
- Call sign meaning: No meaning, taken from former radio sister

Technical information
- Licensing authority: FCC
- Facility ID: 17005
- ERP: 12 kW
- HAAT: 391.4 m (1,284 ft)
- Transmitter coordinates: 44°42′12.5″N 69°4′45.4″W
- Translator(s): W19FA-D Bangor; W36FM-D Etna

Links
- Public license information: Public file; LMS
- Website: www.wabi.tv; "Eastern and Central Maine's CW" (DT2)

WABI-TV (channel 5) is a television station in Bangor, Maine, United States, affiliated with CBS and The CW Plus. Owned by Gray Media, the station has studios on Hildreth Street in West Bangor, and its transmitter is atop Peaked Mountain in Dixmont.

Prior to 2017, WABI-TV was the flagship station of its founding owner Diversified Communications, which was owned by the Hildreth family of Bangor.

== History ==
Community Broadcasting Service, owners of WABI radio (910 AM, now WTOS; and 97.1 FM, now WBFB), filed to apply for a construction permit on July 7, 1952. The permit was granted on December 31, 1952.

WABI-TV was the first television station in Maine and the first in northern New England. It began broadcasting with test transmissions on January 25, 1953, and started its official broadcast on January 31. It was managed in its early years by Murray Carpenter. The station was a primary NBC affiliate, but carried secondary affiliations with the other three major networks of the day (CBS, ABC, and DuMont). It lost CBS to WTWO (channel 2) in 1955; that station had been founded by Carpenter. It lost DuMont soon afterward when that network shut down. After Carpenter sold WTWO to the Rines-Thompson family in 1959, the new owners changed that station's calls to WLBZ-TV and swapped affiliations with WABI-TV, making channel 5 a primary CBS affiliate. The two outlets then began to share ABC programming, which had previously been exclusive to WABI. This ended when WEMT (channel 7, now WVII-TV) signed-on in 1965 and took the affiliation. During the late 1950s, WABI was also briefly affiliated with the NTA Film Network.

The only other station that the Community Broadcasting Service would build and sign on was WMTW in Poland Spring, Maine. This was because the ownership of that station's founder Mount Washington Television, partially overlapped with Community Broadcasting Service. (WMTW was sold in 1964.) In 1957, it purchased WAGM-TV-AM in Presque Isle, Maine; it sold off WAGM radio in 1981 and WAGM-TV in 1984. Community Broadcasting Service merged with Journal Publications to form Diversified Communications in 1971; after the merger, it acquired such stations as WCTI-TV in New Bern, North Carolina, WYOU in Scranton–Wilkes-Barre, Pennsylvania, WPDE in Florence–Myrtle Beach, South Carolina, and WCJB-TV in Gainesville, Florida. Most of these stations were sold off by the late 1990s; by 2017, it was down to two stations: WABI-TV and WCJB-TV.

The radio stations were eventually spun off in 1993 and are currently under the ownership of Blueberry Broadcasting.

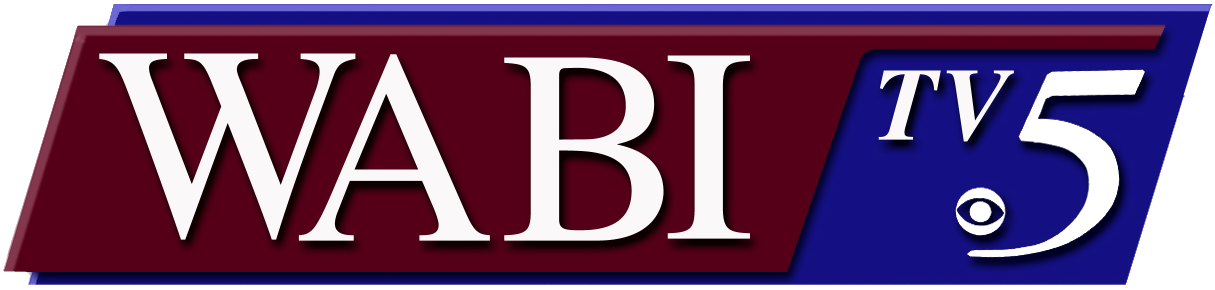
WABI's final logo under Diversified ownership; the logo was replaced on WABI's website with the current logo in May 2017, following the sale to Gray, but WABI continued to utilize this logo on-air and in newscasts until December 2017.

At one point, WABI operated an analog repeater (W61AO channel 61) licensed to Calais with a transmitter in Meddybemps. The transmitter tower was shared with W57AQ channel 57 which repeated WLBZ. Until the mid-1990s, W61AO was used to feed cable systems across the border to the Canadian Maritimes. With the advent of CANCOM, however, WABI's cross-border carriage declined. It is not offered on any systems across the border today including those in St. Stephen, New Brunswick, within W61AO's former signal range. Most cable systems in Atlantic Canada now carry WBZ-TV from Boston for CBS programming. The W61AO license was canceled by the FCC at WABI's request on November 9, 2009.

On July 15, 2014, WABI-TV's contract with Dish Network expired, and both the station and WABI-DT2 were blacked out early on July 16, 2014. Among the issues WABI-TV cited included financial terms, customer service issues between the station and Dish Network, and switching viewers in several counties to another CBS station outside the Bangor media market (such as WGME in the Portland area). After a breakdown of contract talks which picked up slowly, an agreement was reached October 8, 2014, allowing both stations to return to Dish Network later that day.

On February 16, 2017, it was announced that WABI and its sister station WCJB-TV in Gainesville, Florida, would be sold to Gray Television for $85 million. The deal reunited WABI with its former Diversified-owned station in Presque Isle, WAGM-TV. The sale was approved by the Federal Communications Commission (FCC) on April 18, and was completed on May 2. WABI-TV was the last station in the market to be locally owned.

== WABI-DT2 ==
WABI-DT2, branded Eastern and Central Maine's CW, is the CW+-affiliated second digital subchannel of WABI-TV, broadcasting in 720p high definition on channel 5.2.

=== History ===
WABI-DT2 started broadcasting in late-1998 and had the fictional call letters "WBAN". It was part of The WB 100+ cable group as The WB opted for cable-only carriage in markets below the top 100. "WBAN" gradually replaced low-power WBGR-LP as the WB affiliate in Bangor. That station is now with MeTV. On Adelphia systems, this station was on channel 4 and known on-air as "Bangor's WB 4". In early 2006, it swapped channel positions with low-powered Fox affiliate WFVX-LP but continued using the same branding. On January 24, 2006, The WB and UPN announced the two networks would end broadcasting and merge. The new combined service would be called The CW. The letters would represent the first initial of corporate parents CBS (the parent company of UPN) and the Warner Bros. unit of Time Warner. There was no UPN station in the market, so Boston's WSBK-TV and Portland's WPME were piped in through cable.

On July 28, WABI announced it was creating a new second digital subchannel to become part of The CW. On the station's website, an announcement said Time Warner Cable (which was in the process of taking over cable coverage in the Bangor area for bankrupt Adelphia) would have "WBAN" on its system. WABI-DT2 would then become a simulcast of "WBAN" to provide over-the-air viewers access to the new network. The arrangement was part of a three-year deal with WABI which also let the main station be on the system as well. The CW launched on WABI-DT2 (call sign used officially) September 18. On January 10, 2007, WABI introduced redesigned websites for itself and WABI-DT2.

In addition to morning and prime time preemptions designated for local news, WABI-DT2 preempts the allowed two hours in daytime (noon to 2 p.m.) for syndicated fare. The channel also preempts some overnight infomercials in order to provide additional syndicated shows and movies. On June 15, 2012, WABI-DT2 upgraded to high definition as part of a national upgrade of The CW Plus.

== Programming ==
At one point, WABI-TV did not carry all of the network's Southeastern Conference (SEC) college football games on weekends. For several years, the games that were not shown appeared on low-powered Ion affiliate WBGR-LP. WABI preempted CBS games that conflicted with local sports programming and/or its weekend 6 p.m. news and 7 p.m. programming during Nielsen ratings periods. The national games were moved to CW outlet WABI-DT2 effective with the 2009 season. As of 2016, WABI carries all SEC football games cleared by CBS, with the local newscasts airing on WABI-DT2.

The station often preempted CBS programming to air University of Maine sports. It usually rescheduled network prime time to air overnights or on weekends. WABI ended its longtime carriage of UMaine sports in 2013 after failing to reach a new contract with Learfield Sports (which handles marketing for UMaine sports broadcasts); it had been the television flagship of the Black Bear Sports Network for the bulk of its history, with the only break between 1989 through 1997, when WLBZ-TV held the rights. WABI now airs a package of six high school football games on Friday nights during the season (in addition to its long-standing coverage of the championship games). Black Bear sports telecasts would subsequently move to WVII-TV and WFVX-LD.

WABI also formerly aired Boston Red Sox baseball games in 2000 and 2001, syndicated from the Fox 25 Red Sox Television Network. These games moved to WBGR-LP in 2002.

=== News operation ===
==== Main channel ====
For its entire existence, WABI has often earned more viewership than competitors WLBZ and WVII combined. Of the big three network-affiliated television stations in the area, it offers the most live newscasts originating from Bangor. WLBZ serves as a semi-satellite of sister station WCSH in Portland and all newscasts originate from the WCSH studios. WVII only airs four newscasts a day, and its late newscast is pre-taped in advance.

WABI's longtime dominance can also be attributed to its status as the market's last locally owned-and-operated commercial station (prior to the sale to Gray Television). Furthermore, some of its main personnel have remained employed at the station for more than 20 years, which is unusual since Bangor has always been a fairly small market.

On October 11, 2010, WABI became Maine's first station to upgrade newscasts to high definition level. Unlike sister station WCJB-TV in Gainesville, Florida, which revamped its on-air appearance when it converted to high definition newscasts back in January 2009, WABI's newscast elements stayed the same except for slightly updated on-screen graphics. Newscasts seen on WABI-DT2 were not included in the upgrade because the subchannel only aired in standard definition at the time. WABI-DT2 upgraded to HD on June 15, 2012, at which point all local newscasts on the subchannel were also upgraded to HD. In addition to its main studios, WABI operates a Central Maine Bureau on Main Street in Waterville.

==== WABI-DT2 ====
Corresponding with the launch of The CW on September 18, 2006, WABI-DT2 added local news and weather cut-ins during its airing of the nationally syndicated morning show The Daily Buzz from 6 to 8 a.m. A simulcast of the weekday noon news was also added. This was subsequently shifted to a rebroadcast at 12:30 p.m. in September 2008. A new half-hour weeknight newscast at 10 p.m. known as WABI-TV 5 Prime Time News on The CW debuted on its schedule featuring a modified set and "CW" labeled mics. That show competes with a one-hour broadcast seen at the same time on low-powered Fox affiliate WFVX-LD which is produced by WVII. In January 2008, WABI-DT2 replaced the first half hour of the second hour of The Daily Buzz with a thirty-minute extension of the main station's weekday morning show (and that 7–7:30 a.m. morning newscast of WABI-DT2 is now an hour later re-airing of the 6–6:30 a.m. segment). Known as WABI-TV 5 Morning News on The CW, this production is taped in advance and competes with live local news seen at the same time on WFVX-LD (which is also produced by WVII).

==== Notable former on-air staff ====
- Bill Karins – meteorologist
- Michele Marsh – anchor

== Technical information ==
=== Subchannels ===
The station's signal is multiplexed:

Subchannels of WABI-TV
Channel	Res.	Short name	Programming
5.1	1080i	WABI TV	CBS
5.2	720p	THE CW	The CW Plus
5.3	480i	Catchy	Catchy Comedy
5.4	480i	Outlaw	Outlaw
5.5	480i	ION	Ion
5.6	480i	Grit	Grit

WABI-TV entered into an additional affiliation agreement with Decades in 2015. The official launch date was announced as October 1, 2015; but the network soft-launched on a new third subchannel on September 24 at 2:30 p.m., a week prior to that date. However, WABI-DT3 experienced some technical difficulties that first week, losing video that night and again the following afternoon. The problem with the station's receiving satellite dish was, however, diagnosed and repaired, and no further difficulties occurred. WABI-DT3 is available to Spectrum customers in the Bangor DMA on digital channel 1255. Moosehead Enterprises also provides the channel to select customers in Greenville, Rockwood, Guilford and Monson, passing the signal through as channel 5.3. Bee Line Cable provides the channel to its subscribers on channel 5–13. There are no other announced prospective cable or satellite service pick-ups at this time.

On October 1, 2020, an Ion Television digital subchannel was launched on channel 5.5. As a result, WLBZ's Ion digital subchannel 2.3 was replaced by Quest.

=== Analog-to-digital conversion ===
WABI's broadcasts became digital-only, effective on June 12, 2009. On January 4, 2010, the FCC issued a "Report & Order" allowing WABI to move from this allotment to VHF channel 13. The station made this move to be consistent with other full-power stations in the market (which are also on the VHF dial) to save on energy costs as well as improve reception of the station. At 2 p.m.on December 13, 2010, WABI turned off channel 19 and commenced operations on channel 13.
