= WFVX-LD =

Television station in Bangor, Maine

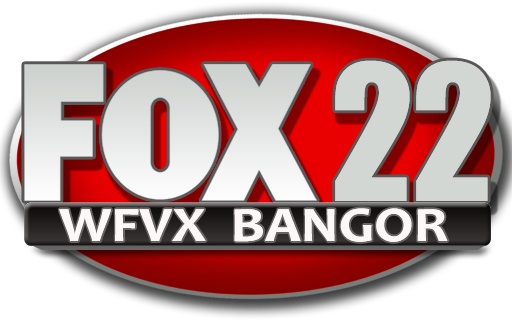
- Bangor, Maine; United States
- Channels: Digital: 7 (VHF), shared with WVII-TV; Virtual: 22
- Branding: Fox 22

Programming
- Affiliations: Fox/MyNetworkTV

Ownership
- Owner: Rockfleet Broadcasting; (Rockfleet Broadcasting III, LLC)
- Sister stations: WVII-TV

History
- First air date: April 13, 2003
- Former call signs: W22BU (1995–2003); WFVX-LP (2003–2013)
- Former channel numbers: Analog: 22 (UHF, 2003–2012); Digital: 22 (UHF, 2012–2023)
- Call sign meaning: Fox for Vanderbilt, Michigan (calls transferred from former sister station WFUP)

Technical information
- Licensing authority: FCC
- Facility ID: 15287
- Class: LD
- ERP: 14 kW
- HAAT: 229 m (751 ft)
- Transmitter coordinates: 44°45′35.2″N 68°33′59.1″W

Links
- Public license information: LMS
- Website: www.foxbangor.com

WFVX-LD (channel 22) is a television station in Bangor, Maine, United States, affiliated with Fox and MyNetworkTV. It is owned by Rockfleet Broadcasting alongside ABC affiliate WVII-TV (channel 7). The two stations share studios on Target Industrial Circle in West Bangor and a transmitter on Black Cap Mountain along the Penobscot and Hancock county line.

In addition to Fox programming, WFVX-LD is a secondary affiliate of MyNetworkTV, and airs Jewelry Television overnight. Despite WFVX-LD legally holding a low-power license, it transmits using WVII-TV's full-power spectrum. This ensures complete reception across the Bangor television market.

== History ==
A construction permit for a low-power station on channel 22 in Bangor was granted on January 12, 1995, and was assigned the call letters W22BU. Following the death of original owner Dale Buschow in 1998, the station was acquired by MS Communications on January 3, 2001; its license to cover was issued on March 1. MS Communications had plans to establish wireless cable networks, but never broadcast anything other than test patterns on its stations. MS sold W22BU to Rockfleet Broadcasting, owner of WVII-TV, in 2003. Rockfleet put the station on the air as a Fox affiliate on April 13, 2003; the following day, the call letters were changed to WFVX-LP. The WFVX call letters were transferred from what is now WFUP, the Vanderbilt, Michigan, satellite of then-sister station and fellow Fox affiliate WFQX-TV in Cadillac, Michigan.

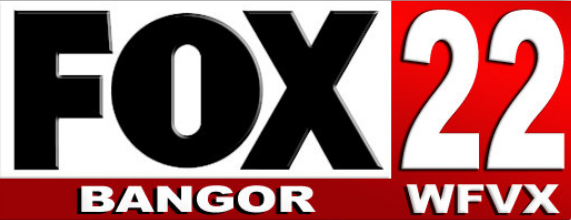
Logo of the television channel used between 2003 and 2012

Before WFVX went on the air, Fox programming was seen on cable via WPXT in Portland, then from Foxnet after WPXT switched to The WB in the fall of 2001. Fox Sports programming was also available in Bangor at various points via WABI-TV (channel 5), WBGR-LP (channel 33), and WCKD-LP (channel 30). WCKD was WVII's first venture into low-power broadcasting in Bangor; it signed a local marketing agreement with James McLeod, owner of channel 30 (then known as W30BF, the former Bangor transmitter for Maine Public Television Plus) and WBGR, in 2000, and relaunched it as a UPN affiliate in 2001. WCKD had tried to become a full Fox affiliate that October to coincide with WPXT's affiliation change, but was blocked from doing so by UPN; this did not stop the station from continuing its existing relationship with Fox Sports. After WFVX's sign on, Rockfleet moved all of WCKD's syndicated and local programming (including a 10 p.m. newscast from WVII and the morning talk show So Goes the Nation), but not the UPN affiliation, to channel 22.

On December 6, 2006, WFVX added a secondary affiliation with Fox's new sister programming service MyNetworkTV. The service was not available in Bangor in its first three months on the air. Currently, programming from MyNetworkTV is seen in a delayed manner from 11:05 until 1:05 early the next morning.

As a low-power station, WFVX was exempt from the digital transition on June 12, 2009; however, on February 17, WVII added a new second digital subchannel to carry WFVX's programming. WFVX has a construction permit to perform a "flash-cut" from analog to digital on the channel 22. On January 23, 2013, the station's call sign was changed to WFVX-LD (with "LD" standing for low-power digital).

On February 28, 2022, WFVX and WVII temporarily changed their logos to blue and yellow, the colors of the Ukrainian flag, in support of Ukraine after the 2022 Russian invasion.

== Programming ==
There is little in the way of local programming on WFVX. A weekday morning talk show, So Goes the Nation, was met with little success. This program was hosted by Charlie Horne and Alan Silberberg from the WFVX studios in Bangor. Originally launched on WCKD-LP in 2002, it moved to WFVX upon its launch, and subsequently added simulcasts on WPFO and WLOB radio in Portland. The broadcast was a three-hour call-in talk show until September 2004 when it was reduced to a single hour before being canceled altogether in November of that year.

WFVX carried Shop at Home overnights until its closure in March 2008; Jewelry Television was added at that time. Since August 2008, WFVX and WVII have also carried programming from the New England Patriots Television Network; the stations split airings of pre-season games, and WFVX airs Patriots All Access, produced out of Boston's WBZ-TV, Sunday mornings at 11 during the NFL season. Starting in November 2009, WFVX began airing IWE: Championship Wrestling every Saturday night; it has since been dropped.

In June 2013, WFVX and WVII reached a deal to carry Husson University sports. This was followed a month later with a deal to carry University of Maine sports; as a result, WFVX and WVII replaced WABI-TV as the television flagship of the Black Bear Sports Network. As part of the deal, Black Bear sports telecasts were also seen on Fox College Sports, and production was handled by Pack Network (WABI had produced its telecasts in-house).

=== News operation ===
WVII produces a weeknight hour-long prime time newscast on WFVX called Fox 22 News at 10, as well as a 7 a.m. newscast under the name The 7 AM News Hour on Fox 22. WFVX also simulcasts WVII's 6:30 a.m. newscast, Good Morning Maine. The 10 p.m. newscast was originally a half-hour long, but was expanded on June 25, 2012. The morning newscast launched on September 7, 2011. Since September 2012, WFVX also airs a half-hour 10 p.m. weekend newscast.

WVII began taping the 10 p.m. newscast earlier in the evening on October 16, 2006, though the sports report was still seen live on Fridays so that game highlights and scores from high school football games could still be featured. As of September 2011, WFVX has resumed airing a live newscast at 10.

WVII currently contracts with AccuWeather to produce the station's forecasts. The segments are recorded in advance with rotating meteorologists and fed via satellite to Bangor from AccuWeather's headquarters in State College, Pennsylvania (which is occasionally referred to as the "Fox 22 Weather Center" on WFVX). As a result, the station may not cover all severe weather events or be too late in doing so when conditions warrant.

== Subchannel ==
Subchannels of WVII-TV and WFVX-LD
License	Channel	Res.	Short name	Programming
WVII-TV	7.1	720p	WVII-DT	ABC
WVII-TV	7.3	720p	MovieSP	MovieSphere Gold
WFVX-LD	7.2	720p	WFVX	Fox & MyNetworkTV

== See also ==
- Channel 7 digital TV stations in the United States
- Channel 22 virtual TV stations in the United States
- WFQX-TV/WFUP
