= Tony Granger =

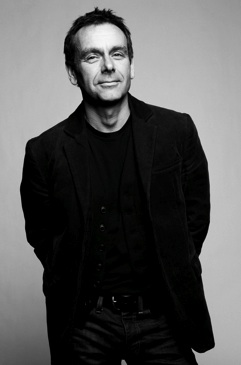

Tony Granger is the global chief creative officer of the New York-based global advertising agency Young & Rubicam.

== Career ==
Tony Granger is Global Chief Creative Officer of Young & Rubicam (a part of WPP) and architect of the company's global creative community.

Since arriving at Young & Rubicam in 2008, Granger has attracted some of the industry's best creative talent and fully integrated digital into the agency.

He has also built a global creative community in both spirit and practice. As a result, all of Y&R's clients – anywhere in the world – get access to precisely the right creative talent they need to create the most appropriate and powerful work.

Creating a collaborative creative culture has resulted in great work and results for clients such as Land Rover, Dell, Wendy's, Gatorade, and Vodafone.

It's also earned great industry recognition. At this past Cannes Lions in June 2015, Y&R won 89 Lions across 15 categories, holding its rank as the fourth most winning agency network of the year for the fourth consecutive year. Y&R had more offices winning Lions than any other network. In addition, Y&R Team Red Istanbul won the Grand Prix in Media for its Red Light App to protect women from domestic abuse.

Before joining Y&R, Granger spent five years at Saatchi & Saatchi, where he took Saatchi New York to the number one agency at Cannes. There, too, he led the agency's creative transformation. He led a similar renaissance at Bozell New York, where he took the agency to number three in the world. Granger began his career in his native South Africa, where he led TBWA/Hunt Lascaris, a shop of proud heritage and creative pedigree.

Granger and his agencies have won many awards, and he's been fortunate to serve as president of several international juries, most recently serving as the Outdoor Jury President at Cannes in 2013. But he's most proud to have shaped top creative agencies, and worked with the world's most sought-after clients on some of the most recognized and influential global brands. He is excited about the future of the business and this industry.

In a series of emails quoted in Business Insider in 2013, Mark Mackay, Executive Chairman of Australian agency The Campaign Palace, described Granger as "an arrogant leader in New York", as well as lacking "commercial savvy" and as a "bully". He said, "One needs to humour bullies and the way that one does it is as I have outlined in these emails."

Paul Fishlock, then Executive Creative Director of Campaign Palace, later dismissed, brought a case against the agency and won. In a long article, Australian trade publication Mumbrella reports of the case that "Fishlock is entirely vindicated in his claims that he was unfairly axed as national creative chief of the now defunct Campaign Palace", and that "The reputation of Young & Rubicam's global creative director Tony Granger certainly takes a battering in my view. The word 'bully' is a hard one to come back from."
