= WGCI =

WGCI may refer to:

- WGCI-FM, a radio station (107.5 FM) licensed to serve Chicago, Illinois, United States
- WGCI-LD, a low-powered television repeater (channel 4) licensed to serve Skowhegan, Maine, United States; rebroadcasts WLBZ Bangor, Maine
