= WIPL =

Television station in Lewiston, Maine

- Lewiston–Portland, Maine; United States
- City: Lewiston, Maine
- Channels: Digital: 24 (UHF); Virtual: 35

Programming
- Affiliations: 35.1: Ion Television; for others, see § Subchannels

Ownership
- Owner: Ion Media; (Ion Media License Company, LLC)

History
- First air date: August 13, 1997
- Former call signs: WPME (1997−2018)
- Former channel numbers: Analog: 35 (UHF, 1997–2008); Digital: 28 (UHF, 2006–2008), 35 (UHF, 2008–2019)
- Former affiliations: UPN (1997–2006); The WB (secondary, 1997–2001); MyNetworkTV (2006–2018)
- Call sign meaning: "Ion Portland"

Technical information
- Licensing authority: FCC
- Facility ID: 48408
- ERP: 16 kW
- HAAT: 542.25 m (1,779 ft)
- Transmitter coordinates: 43°50′44″N 70°45′41″W

Links
- Public license information: Public file; LMS
- Website: iontelevision.com

WIPL (channel 35) is a television station licensed to Lewiston, Maine, United States, broadcasting the Ion Television network to the Portland area. The station is owned by the Ion Media subsidiary of the E. W. Scripps Company, and maintains transmitter facilities in West Baldwin, Maine.

== History ==
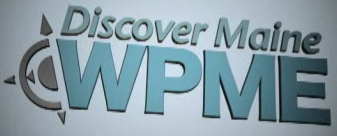
Former logo of WPME-DT2 (under its former "Maine Visitor's Channel" branding), used from 2009 until 2012

Former logo of WPME used from 2015 until 2018

The Federal Communications Commission (FCC) granted a construction permit to original station owner Kennebec Valley Television in 1987. After ten years of delays related to difficulties in obtaining financing to construct the station and commence broadcasting, Kennebec Valley Television's corporate successor New England Broadcasting was granted an unbuilt station waiver and WPME signed on August 13, 1997, under a time brokerage agreement with WPXT owner Pegasus Communications Corporation. Prior to WPME's sign-on, viewers in Portland who wanted to watch UPN had to view it on cable via Boston's WSBK-TV. In February 2001, New England Broadcasting sold WPME to KB Prime Media LLC, which inherited the previous agreement with Pegasus. Pegasus Communications was permitted by the FCC to purchase WPME outright in February 2005 under the previously-granted unbuilt station waiver. The station maintained a primary affiliation with UPN and secondary affiliation with The WB. It aired WB prime time on a tape delay starting at 10. When WPXT switched its affiliation from Fox to The WB, this secondary affiliation was dropped. WPME aired Boston Celtics and Bruins games in the late 1990s and Red Sox baseball until 2002. The Red Sox, owning half of cable sports network NESN, moved the games to that network.

This station's only attempt at local news was a 7 p.m. broadcast (produced by WPXT) in 2001 which was quickly canceled due to low ratings and inconsistent viewership. WPXT's 10 p.m. newscast was also simulcast on WPME for a period of time. Pegasus declared bankruptcy in June 2004 over a dispute with DirecTV over marketing of the direct broadcast satellite service in rural areas. The Pegasus station group was sold in August 2006 to private investment firm CP Media, LLC of Wilkes-Barre, Pennsylvania, for $55.5 million. CP Media eventually formed a new broadcasting company, New Age Media.

In the wake of the merger of The WB and UPN into The CW, WPXT was announced as that network's Portland affiliate on March 9, 2006. WPME would then announce it would associate with MyNetworkTV on May 1, a network owned by News Corporation that was made up of stations which would not become CW affiliates. WPME joined the network on its launch date, September 5, 2006. It would be the only MyNetworkTV affiliate in Maine until December 6, 2006, when Bangor Fox affiliate WFVX-LD took a secondary affiliation with the network.

On June 27, 2008, WPME signed-on a new second digital subchannel to be the "Maine Visitor's Channel" (which was dropped in October 2014 to make room for Movies!) and a third subchannel to be QVC (replaced by Laff on November 7, 2016). It ceased transmission in analog on September 18, 2008, ten months prior to the revised FCC digital switchover deadline of June 12, 2009.

Throughout its history, the station has also produced and aired several local programs. From 2009 to 2013 this has included a simulcast of conservative weekday morning program The Ray Richardson Show produced by WLOB, which was seen for an hour from 6:30 until 7:30 featuring short features and news stories from Fox News Radio, local weather forecasts on WPME during commercial breaks, as well as live call-ins from viewers and listeners along with in-studio guests. The broadcast originated from WLOB's facility on Warren Avenue in Portland's Riverton section.

Fellow MyNetworkTV affiliate WZMY-TV, based in Derry, New Hampshire, with service to southern areas of the state and Greater Boston, laid off several employees as part of an overall strategy change in December 2009. Although that station continued to be licensed to Shooting Star Broadcasting, an outsourcing agreement was established with New Age Media resulting in WZMY becoming a sister outlet to WPME. The move was designed to streamline operations and some of its programming options in order to be more hyper-local. The arrangement ended after WZMY was sold to Carlisle One Media, becoming WBIN-TV, in 2011; it is now Univision Communications-owned WWJE-DT.

MPS Media announced in March 2012 that it would sell WPME to Triumph Broadcasting for $75,000. The deal was contingent on WPXT's concurrent sale from New Age Media to Tyche Broadcasting. On November 13, 2012, WPME filed a non-consummation notice to the FCC, meaning the transaction was made null and void. On February 13, 2013, MPS Media filed to sell WPME to Cottonwood Communications; this deal was concurrent with the sale of WPXT to Ironwood Communications, which took over WPME's operations through a shared services agreement. The FCC granted its approval of the sale on April 2. The sale was consummated on May 20. On July 2, 2015, Ironwood chose to exercise an option to acquire WPME outright for $65,000; the company sought a failed station waiver, as there are not enough stations in the Portland market to permit a duopoly without a waiver.

Ion Media agreed to buy WPME from Ironwood Communications for $900,000 on December 4, 2017; under a shared services agreement, Ironwood would continue to provide services to the station. The sale did not include WPME's programming contracts. Ahead of the sale's closing, MyNetworkTV, Escape and Laff programming was moved to the third, fourth and fifth subchannels of WPXT on March 22, 2018. The sale was completed on March 29, 2018, at which time the station's call letters were changed to WIPL. This was a return of sorts of Ion to the Portland market: Ion's predecessor, Paxson Communications, previously owned WMPX-TV from 1999 to 2003, affiliating it with what was then the Pax TV network. That station was sold to Max Media in 2003, becoming Fox affiliate WPFO.

On February 27, 2021, WIPL's second, third and fourth subchannels became affiliates of Court TV, Bounce TV and Grit when Qubo, Ion Plus and Ion Shop ceased broadcasting.

== Subchannels ==
The station's signal is multiplexed:

Subchannels of WIPL
Subchannel	Res.	Short name	Programming
35.1	720p	ION	Ion Television
35.2	480i	CourtTV	Court TV
35.3	480i	Bounce	Bounce TV
35.4	480i	Grit	Grit
35.5	480i	IONPlus	Ion Plus
35.6	480i	BUSTED	Busted
35.7	480i	GameSho	Game Show Central
35.8	480i	HSN	HSN
35.9	480i	QVC2	QVC2
