= WKZX (Maine) =

Radio station in Presque Isle, Maine (1932–1991)

- Presque Isle, Maine; United States
- Frequency: 950 kHz

Programming
- Format: Adult contemporary

Ownership
- Owner: Colonial Broadcasting Company
- Operator: CanXus Broadcasting Corporation

History
- First air date: January 6, 1932
- Last air date: 1991
- Former call signs: WAGM (1932–1981)
- Former frequencies: 1420 kHz (1932–1941), 1450 kHz (1941–1958)

Technical information
- Facility ID: 12319
- Power: 5,000 watts
- Transmitter coordinates: 44°46′23″N 68°49′45″W

WKZX was a radio station broadcasting on 950 AM in Presque Isle, Maine, that operated from 1932 to 1991. It was the first radio station in Presque Isle, broadcasting under the call letters WAGM from its inception until 1981.

== History ==
On January 9, 1931, the Aroostook Broadcasting Corporation filed for a construction permit to build a new radio station on 1420 kHz in Presque Isle, approved by the Federal Radio Commission on May 26 of that year. Initially assigned WMHM, the call letters were quickly changed to WAGM before going on the air January 6, 1932. The new radio station, owned by ham operators Red Hughes and Bob McIntosh, had a young staff: its five employees ranged in age from 19 to 27. The original studios were located on the top floor of the Old Theater Building and primarily had basic, handmade equipment. The operation was so small that Harold Glidden, who was the manager of WAGM, was its only salesman until the mid-1940s. WAGM moved with other stations on the frequency to 1450 kHz when NARBA came into force on March 29, 1941.

In the winter of 1944, a fire destroyed WAGM's facility. The 100-watt outlet increased power to 250 watts in 1946, part of a post-fire move to studios on State Street. Additionally, WAGM affiliated with the Keystone Broadcasting System, which distributed transcriptions of programming to stations. The power increase improved WAGM's coverage of the "Golden Triangle" of Presque Isle, Caribou, and Fort Fairfield, as well as its ability to attract sales accounts. A television station, WAGM-TV, was started in October 1956. In 1957, original owner Harold Glidden sold Aroostook Broadcasting to Community Broadcasting Service, a company owned by then-Governor Horace Hildreth that owned WABI-AM-TV in Bangor. Community increased WABI's power to 5,000 watts during the day on a new frequency of 950 kHz in 1958. At the time of purchasing WAGM, Community had held a permit to build a new station of its own in Presque Isle, as WABQ; it relinquished the construction permit as a condition of the acquisition.

Community Broadcasting Service merged with Journal Publications in 1971 to form Diversified Communications. WAGM radio was sold for $235,000 in 1981 to Colonial Broadcasting Company, a group of three men with Presque Isle real estate interests. The television station kept the call letters, and Colonial chose to rename its station WKZX, effective May 25.

In September 1991, the FCC issued a fine of $10,000 to Dennis H. Curley's CanXus Broadcasting Corporation for having assumed control of WKZX from Colonial, considered an unlicensed transfer of control. In assessing the fine, the commission's Mass Media Bureau noted that, while a transfer of control had been applied for in January 1988 (with a sale price of $216,000), WKZX had become financially indistinguishable from CanXus as early as September 1987, CanXus was promoting WKZX as its station in press releases and on stationery, while it was also making programming decisions. The commission stated that Colonial had "abdicated financial control" of the station. The two companies had become so intertwined that preparation of separate tax returns was difficult. While CanXus programmed WKZX, the station aired an adult contemporary format.

By the time of the FCC issuing its fine to CanXus, WKZX had gone silent. The FCC deleted the station on December 16, 1991.

The building where WKZX was located remained abandoned for many years before it was torn down sometime in the 2010s.
