= Channel 7 digital TV stations in the United States =

The following television stations broadcast on digital channel 7 in the United States:

- K07BW-D in Westcliffe, Colorado, on virtual channel 11, which rebroadcasts KKTV
- K07CG-D in Toquerville, Utah, on virtual channel 5, which rebroadcasts KSL-TV
- K07CH-D in Plains & Paradise, Montana, on virtual channel 4, which rebroadcasts KXLY-TV
- K07DI-D in Hinsdale, Montana, on virtual channel 8, which rebroadcasts KUMV-TV
- K07DU-D in Ely & McGill, Nevada, on virtual channel 4, which rebroadcasts KTVX
- K07DV-D in Ruth, Nevada, on virtual channel 4, which rebroadcasts KTVX
- K07ED-D in Enterprise, Utah, on virtual channel 5, which rebroadcasts KSL-TV
- K07EJ-D in Townsend, Montana, on virtual channel 21, which rebroadcasts KHBB-LD
- K07EN-D in Woodsbay, Lakeside, Montana, on virtual channel 23, which rebroadcasts KTMF
- K07EQ-D in Ekalaka, Montana, on virtual channel 11, which rebroadcasts KQME
- K07FL-D in Thompson Falls, Montana, on virtual channel 8, which rebroadcasts KPAX-TV
- K07GI-D in Prospect, Oregon, on virtual channel 10, which rebroadcasts KTVL
- K07GJ-D in Hoopa, California, on virtual channel 3, which rebroadcasts KIEM-TV
- K07GQ-D in Cedar City, Utah, on virtual channel 7, which rebroadcasts KUED
- K07HM-D in Big Piney, etc., Wyoming, on virtual channel 2, which rebroadcasts KTWO-TV
- K07HS-D in Williams, Oregon, on virtual channel 5, which rebroadcasts KOBI
- K07IB-D in Whitewater, Montana, on virtual channel 4, which rebroadcasts KHMT
- K07IC-D in Malta, Montana, on virtual channel 5, which rebroadcasts KFBB-TV
- K07IT-D in West Glacier, etc., Montana, on virtual channel 42, which rebroadcasts KTMF
- K07JG-D in Glasgow, Montana, on virtual channel 5, which rebroadcasts KFBB-TV
- K07JO-D in Chelan Butte, Washington, on virtual channel 7, which rebroadcasts KSPS-TV
- K07JT-D in Brookings, Oregon, on virtual channel 5, which rebroadcasts KOBI
- K07KF-D in Thomasville, Colorado, on virtual channel 5, which rebroadcasts KREX-TV
- K07NL-D in Juliaetta, Idaho, on virtual channel 2, which rebroadcasts KREM
- K07NR-D in Lakeview, etc., Oregon, on virtual channel 2, which rebroadcasts KOTI
- K07NU-D in White Sulphur Springs, Montana, on virtual channel 8, which rebroadcasts KULR-TV
- K07OC-D in Polaris, Montana, on virtual channel 4, which rebroadcasts KXLF-TV
- K07OJ-D in Snowflake, Arizona, on virtual channel 10, which rebroadcasts KSAZ-TV
- K07OL-D in Kipnuk, Alaska, on virtual channel 7, which rebroadcasts K03GL-D
- K07PA-D in Manitou Springs, Colorado, on virtual channel 8, which rebroadcasts KTSC
- K07PB-D in Thayne, etc., Wyoming, on virtual channel 8, which rebroadcasts KIFI-TV
- K07PF-D in Homer, Alaska, on virtual channel 7, which rebroadcasts KAKM
- K07PG-D in Seward, Alaska
- K07PZ-D in Cave Junction, Oregon, on virtual channel 5, which rebroadcasts KOBI
- K07QC-D in Driggs, Idaho, on virtual channel 3, which rebroadcasts KIDK
- K07QD-D in Hooper Bay, Alaska, on virtual channel 7, which rebroadcasts K03GL-D
- K07QX-D in Golovin, Alaska, on virtual channel 7, which rebroadcasts K03GL-D
- K07RB-D in Tanana, Alaska, on virtual channel 7, which rebroadcasts K03GL-D
- K07RD-D in Savoonga, Alaska, on virtual channel 7, which rebroadcasts K03GL-D
- K07RJ-D in Holy Cross, Alaska, on virtual channel 7, which rebroadcasts K03GL-D
- K07RK-D in St. Marys, Alaska
- K07RU-D in Dot Lake, Alaska
- K07RY-D in Chignik, Alaska, on virtual channel 7, which rebroadcasts K03GL-D
- K07SS-D in Angoon, Alaska, on virtual channel 7, which rebroadcasts K03GL-D
- K07ST-D in Women's Bay, Alaska
- K07TH-D in Lime Village, Alaska
- K07TK-D in Marshall, Alaska, on virtual channel 7, which rebroadcasts K03GL-D
- K07UY-D in Cortez, Colorado, on virtual channel 7
- K07VA-D in Jordan, Montana, on virtual channel 5, which rebroadcasts KFBB-TV
- K07VY-D in The Dalles, Oregon, on virtual channel 6, which rebroadcasts KOIN
- K07WJ-D in Colstrip, Montana, on virtual channel 6, which rebroadcasts KSVI
- K07WP-D in Roundup, Montana, on virtual channel 6, which rebroadcasts KSVI
- K07XL-D in Mountain Home, Arkansas, on virtual channel 26, which rebroadcasts K26GS-D
- K07XM-D in Mink Creek, Idaho, on virtual channel 13, which rebroadcasts KSTU
- K07YJ-D in Bullhead City, Arizona, on virtual channel 10, which rebroadcasts KSAZ-TV
- K07ZE-D in Rural Juab, etc., Utah, on virtual channel 8, which rebroadcasts KTTA-LD
- K07ZG-D in Powderhorn Valley, Colorado, on virtual channel 8, which rebroadcasts KTSC
- K07ZL-D in Leavenworth, Washington, on virtual channel 2, which rebroadcasts KREM
- K07ZP-D in Bull Lake Valley, Montana, on virtual channel 2, which rebroadcasts KREM
- K07ZQ-D in Georgetown, Idaho, on virtual channel 6, which rebroadcasts KPVI-DT
- K07ZR-D in Harlowton & Shawmut, Montana, on virtual channel 6, which rebroadcasts KSVI
- K07ZT-D in Long Valley Junction, Utah
- K07ZU-D in Blanding, Monticello, Utah
- K07ZV-D in Sigurd & Salina, Utah, on virtual channel 2, which rebroadcasts KUTV
- K07ZW-D in Marysvale, Utah, on virtual channel 2, which rebroadcasts KUTV
- K07ZX-D in Woodland & Kamas, Utah, on virtual channel 2, which rebroadcasts KUTV
- K07ZY-D in Beaver, etc., Utah, on virtual channel 7, which rebroadcasts KUED
- K07ZZ-D in East Price, Utah, on virtual channel 2, which rebroadcasts KUTV
- K07AAA-D in Helper, Utah, on virtual channel 2, which rebroadcasts KUTV
- K07AAB-D in Roosevelt, etc., Utah, on virtual channel 2, which rebroadcasts KUTV
- K07AAD-D in Fort Worth, Texas, on virtual channel 7
- K07AAF-D in Corsicana, Texas
- K07AAI-D in Reno, Nevada
- K07AAL-D in Orogrande, New Mexico
- K07AAN-D in Santa Maria, California
- KABC-TV in Los Angeles, California, on virtual channel 7
- KAII-TV in Wailuku, Hawaii, on virtual channel 7
- KAIL in Fresno, California, on virtual channel 7
- KAUU in Anchorage, Alaska, on virtual channel 5
- KAZT-TV in Prescott, Arizona, on virtual channel 7
- KBNZ-LD in Bend, Oregon, on virtual channel 7
- KBSH-DT in Hays, Kansas, on virtual channel 7
- KDHU-LD in Houston, Texas, on virtual channel 50
- KETS in Little Rock, Arkansas, on virtual channel 2
- KGWL-TV in Lander, Wyoming, on virtual channel 5
- KHQA-TV in Hannibal, Missouri, on virtual channel 7, which will move to channel 22
- KHXL-LD in Huntsville, Texas, on virtual channel 7
- KJJC-LD in Helena, Montana, on virtual channel 7, which rebroadcasts KJJC-TV
- KJRR in Jamestown, North Dakota, on virtual channel 7
- KJUN-CD in Morgan City, Louisiana, on virtual channel 30
- KLAS-TV in Las Vegas, Nevada, on virtual channel 8
- KLML in Grand Junction, Colorado, on virtual channel 20
- KLTV in Tyler, Texas, on virtual channel 7
- KMGH-TV in Denver, Colorado, on virtual channel 7
- KMNE-TV in Bassett, Nebraska, on virtual channel 7
- KMNF-LD in Mankato, Minnesota, on virtual channel 7
- KNEP in Scottsbluff, Nebraska, on virtual channel 4
- KOAC-TV in Corvallis, Oregon, on virtual channel 7
- KOAM-TV in Pittsburg, Kansas, on virtual channel 7
- KOAT-TV in Albuquerque, New Mexico, on virtual channel 7
- KOCO-TV in Oklahoma City, Oklahoma, on virtual channel 5
- KONC in Alexandria, Minnesota
- KOSA-TV in Odessa, Texas, on virtual channel 7
- KOTA-TV in Rapid City, South Dakota, on virtual channel 3
- KOTR-LD in Monterey, California, on virtual channel 11
- KPAX-TV in Missoula, Montana, on virtual channel 8
- KPLC in Lake Charles, Louisiana, on virtual channel 7
- KQCD-TV in Dickinson, North Dakota, on virtual channel 7
- KQTV in St. Joseph, Missouri, on virtual channel 2
- KRCA in Riverside, California, which uses KABC-TV's spectrum, on virtual channel 62
- KRCR-TV in Redding, California, on virtual channel 7
- KRON-TV in San Francisco, California, on virtual channel 4
- KRTV in Great Falls, Montana, on virtual channel 3
- KSPS-TV in Spokane, Washington, on virtual channel 7
- KTBC in Austin, Texas, on virtual channel 7
- KTNL-TV in Sitka, Alaska, on virtual channel 7
- KTTW in Sioux Falls, South Dakota, on virtual channel 7
- KTVB in Boise, Idaho, on virtual channel 7
- KWWL in Waterloo, Iowa, on virtual channel 7
- KZTC-LD in San Diego, California, on virtual channel 7
- W07DC-D in Allentown/Bethlehem, Pennsylvania, on virtual channel 16, which rebroadcasts WNEP-TV
- W07DD-D in Champaign, Illinois, on virtual channel 7
- W07DS-D in Burnsville, North Carolina, on virtual channel 4, which rebroadcasts WYFF
- W07DT-D in Tryon & Columbus, North Carolina, on virtual channel 4, which rebroadcasts WYFF
- WABC-TV in New York, New York, on virtual channel 7
- WACS-TV in Dawson, Georgia, on virtual channel 25
- WACX in Leesburg, Florida, on virtual channel 55
- WBBZ-TV in Springville, New York, on virtual channel 67
- WCDN-LD in Cleveland, Ohio, on virtual channel 53
- WCHU-LD in Oakwood Hills, Illinois, on virtual channel 59, which rebroadcasts WTVK
- WDAM-TV in Laurel, Mississippi, on virtual channel 7
- WFGC in Palm Beach, Florida, on virtual channel 61
- WFVX-LD in Bangor, Maine, on virtual channel 22
- WGTV in Athens, Georgia, on virtual channel 8
- WHFL-CD in Goldsboro, North Carolina, on virtual channel 43
- WHMB-TV in Indianapolis, Indiana, on virtual channel 40
- WICZ-TV in Binghamton, New York, on virtual channel 40
- WJBK in Detroit, Michigan, on virtual channel 2
- WJLA-TV in Washington, D.C., on virtual channel 7
- WKIN-CD in Weber County, Virginia/Kingsport, Tennessee, on virtual channel 36, which rebroadcasts WAPK-CD
- WKNX-TV in Knoxville, Tennessee, on virtual channel 7
- WLJC-TV in Beattyville, Kentucky, on virtual channel 65
- WNPT in Nashville, Tennessee, on virtual channel 8
- WNYA in Pittsfield, Massachusetts, on virtual channel 51
- WOLO-TV in Columbia, South Carolina, on virtual channel 25
- WOOD-TV in Grand Rapids, Michigan, on virtual channel 8
- WPRI-TV in Providence, Rhode Island, on virtual channel 12
- WSAW-TV in Wausau, Wisconsin, on virtual channel 7
- WSET-TV in Lynchburg, Virginia, on virtual channel 13
- WSTE-DT in Ponce, Puerto Rico, on virtual channel 7
- WTPC-TV in Virginia Beach, Virginia, on virtual channel 21
- WTRF-TV in Wheeling, West Virginia, on virtual channel 7
- WVII-TV in Bangor, Maine, on virtual channel 7
- WVTM-TV in Birmingham, Alabama, on virtual channel 13
- WVNY in Burlington, Vermont, on virtual channel 22
- WXGA-TV in Waycross, Georgia, on virtual channel 8

The following stations, which are no longer licensed, formerly broadcast on digital channel 7:

- K07BE-D in Gunnison, Colorado
- K07GD-D in Glenwood Springs, Colorado
- K07IA-D in Oakland, Oregon
- K07JS-D in North Bend, Oregon
- K07QU-D in Shaktoolik, Alaska
- K07QV-D in Hoonah, Alaska
- K07RC-D in Fort Yukon, Alaska
- K07RZ-D in Crooked Creek, Alaska
- K07VH-D in Sargents, Colorado
- K07ZB-D in Mendenhall Valley, Alaska
- K07ZC-D in Ellensburg/Kittitas, Washington
- KCCO-TV in Alexandria, Minnesota
- KFYF in Fairbanks, Alaska
- KJCW in Sheridan, Wyoming
- KWNV in Winnemucca, Nevada
- W07BP-D in Ocala, Florida
- W07DN-D in Wardensville, etc., West Virginia
- W07DR-D in Manchester, New Hampshire
- WDQB-LD in Wilmington, North Carolina
- WNGA-LD in Salisbury, Maryland
