= Mumbrella =

Australian media news website

- Mumbrella front page on 27 May 2017
- Website type: Media and marketing news
- Owner: Diversified Communications
- Creator: Tim Burrowes
- Editor: Olivia Kruimel
- Website: mumbrella.com.au
- Commercial: Yes
- Registration: Free
- Launched: 9 December 2008

Mumbrella is an Australian marketing and media industry news website. It was started in December 2008 by Tim Burrowes, and has since gone on to become a popular source for news, analysis and commentary on the advertising, PR, and media industries. As of 2021, its parent company is Focal Attractions.

== History ==
=== Background ===
After beginning his career as a newspaper journalist, Tim Burrowes gained experience writing on the media and marketing industries after he was appointed editor at UK advertising industry magazine MediaWeek. He later became editor of B&T Magazine in Australia, before deciding to create Mumbrella.

=== Founding of Mumbrella ===
Founded in 2008 by Burrowes, Mumbrella sought to fill a gap in the niche market for up-to-date advertising and media industry news, an area then dominated by weekly industry trade magazines. The name Mumbrella was suggested by a friend after Burrowes described his idea for the site as being about things under the 'media and marketing umbrella', a phrase that the name ultimately became derived from.

Mumbrella was initially designed to primarily be a free weekly email newsletter, with the website simply acting antecedent to it. However, the site quickly became the prime focus after it rapidly gained an audience through its fast reporting on industry news and critical commentary. By 2012, the website was reaching over 200,000 unique readers per month, and turning over A$1.5m per year through its various revenue streams.

The business was sold to US-based events company Diversified Communications for a reported AU$8 million at the end of 2017, with a view to expanding the events side of the Mumbrella brand.

== Mumbrella Asia ==
Mumbrella expanded into the Asian market in 2013 with the launch of Mumbrella Asia, which hosted Asian versions of its successful Mumbrella Awards and Mumbrella360 industry conference.

However in December 2019, Mumbrella announced that it would shut down its Asian website as it failed to achieve all three major sources of revenue around advertising, ticket sales and sponsorship, comparatively to its Australian website. In addition, the publication had failed to attract advertising because of its aggressive reporting, which displeased the marketing industry and the Singapore government.

== Encore magazine ==
=== Background ===
Encore magazine was a continuation of the Australian Film Review (Feb. 1983–June 1984). Also titled Encore Australia, Encore!, Encore the Production Magazine, and Broadcast (which was the name of a separate magazine from 1986 to 1989), Encore was produced biweekly between 1984 and 1999 and monthly from 2000. Its later issues were online only, and by the 2000s was owned by Reed Business Information.

In 2006, Encore published its last list of Top 20 Directors and Producers.

=== Takeover ===
The parent company of Mumbrella, Focal Attractions, bought Encore in late 2009. In November 2011, the magazine was relaunched with a widened focus on all types of media and entertainment, although it would also continue to cover the Australian screen industry. The first issue of the relaunch included articles on breakfast television, car advertising and Austereo boss Guy Dobson.

In 2010 and 2011, Encore published its "Power 50", comprising "screen professionals who have achieved new heights... whose decisions influence and shape Australia's audiovisual industry".

Encore ceased publication at the end of 2013, with Reed maintaining ownership of the Encore Directory, an online database of operators in the film industry.

== Events ==
Mumbrella runs a number of industry events to in addition to its website.

Mumbrella360, the leading advertising and media conference in Australia, was launched in 2011. As of 2019 it attracted over 2000 attendees across three days, and through its high ticket price and significant sponsorship deals, became a major income stream for the publication.

Mumbrella runs media and marketing industry awards show the Mumbrella Awards, launched in 2013, an event which drew over 1000 attendees in 2019.

The site also hosts a number of more specific industry events and professional training classes across Australia.
