= WLBZ =

Television station in Bangor, Maine

Semi-satellite of WCSH, Portland, Maine

- Bangor, Maine; United States
- Channels: Digital: 2 (VHF); Virtual: 2
- Branding: WLBZ 2; News Center Maine

Programming
- Affiliations: 2.1: NBC; for others, see § Subchannels

Ownership
- Owner: Tegna Inc., a subsidiary of Nexstar Media Group; (TEGNA East Coast Broadcasting, LLC)
- Sister stations: WCSH

History
- First air date: September 12, 1954
- Former call signs: WTWO (1954–1958); WLBZ-TV (1958–1997)
- Former channel numbers: Analog: 2 (VHF, 1954–2009); Digital: 25 (UHF, 2002–2009)
- Former affiliations: Independent (1954–1955); CBS (1955–1959); ABC (secondary, 1959–1965)
- Call sign meaning: taken from former sister station WLBZ radio

Technical information
- Licensing authority: FCC
- Facility ID: 39644
- ERP: 3 kW
- HAAT: 192 m (630 ft)
- Transmitter coordinates: 44°44′10.2″N 68°40′15.1″W
- Translator(s): WGCI-LD 4 Skowhegan

Links
- Public license information: Public file; LMS
- Website: www.newscentermaine.com

WLBZ (channel 2) is a television station in Bangor, Maine, United States, affiliated with NBC and owned by the Tegna subsidiary of Nexstar Media Group. The station's studios are located on Mount Hope Avenue in Bangor, and its transmitter is located on Rider Bluff in Holden.

Although identifying as a separate station in its own right, WLBZ is considered a semi-satellite of sister station WCSH (channel 6) in Portland. WLBZ's master control, as well as some internal operations, are housed at WCSH's studios on Congress Square in Downtown Portland. WLBZ clears all network programming as provided through its parent, simulcasts most of WCSH's newscasts (with local weather inserts) and airs most of its syndicated programming (though in some cases at different times). There are also some programs that only air on WLBZ while some are only seen on WCSH. WLBZ also airs separate station identifications and commercial inserts. Although WLBZ and WCSH are based in different locations and technically serve separate markets, the two essentially operate as one station. With their combined resources, the stations provide statewide coverage not offered by any other outlet in Maine.

WLBZ previously served as the default NBC affiliate for the Presque Isle market, which did not have an affiliate of its own. It is carried in the local tier of Spectrum's cable system in Presque Isle, and is also offered as the NBC affiliate in the Presque Isle Dish Network and DirecTV channel lineups. This changed in 2020, however, with the sign-on of NBC affiliate WWPI-LD by CBS/Fox/CW+ affiliate (and sister station of rival WABI-TV) WAGM-TV. In addition to its main signal, WLBZ operates low-power digital repeater WGCI-LD on VHF channel 4. Licensed to Skowhegan, this station has a transmitter in Norridgewock's Larone section.

== History ==
Logo as WTWO featuring its "Mitey Two" mascot.

The station began broadcasting on September 12, 1954, as WTWO (sometimes rendered as "W-TWO"), an independent station locally owned by Murray Carpenter. The following January, it began carrying some CBS programming; becoming a full affiliate by September 1955 prior to this, CBS programming was seen in Bangor on WABI-TV (channel 5), which became a primary NBC affiliate. In 1958, WTWO was sold to the Rines family's Maine Broadcasting System, owner of WLBZ radio (620 AM), WCSH-AM-TV in Portland, and WRDO in Augusta. The new ownership changed the station's call letters to WLBZ-TV that June to match its new radio sister (which the Rines had owned since 1944). The following year, channel 2 swapped affiliations with WABI-TV and joined NBC in order to match WCSH-TV; the two stations also began to share a secondary ABC affiliation (previously, ABC programming was only cleared on WABI). The ABC arrangement remained in place until 1965, when WEMT (channel 7, now WVII-TV) signed on as a full-time ABC affiliate.

In its first decades on the air, channel 2 was best known as the home of Eddie Driscoll. He hosted many programs on the station including Weird, Dialing for Dollars, The Great Money Movie, and My Backyard. Driscoll was also known for his improvisation skills and sense of humor. He retired from WLBZ-TV in 1986, and died on September 24, 2006, after suffering from Alzheimer's disease.

In the 1970s, WLBZ-TV added a repeater in Calais, W57AQ on channel 57, with a transmitter in Meddybemps shared with W61AO (which repeated WABI-TV). W57AQ allowed cable systems in Atlantic Canada to distribute WLBZ by a microwave link from the border, doubling or even tripling the station's coverage area and viewership. Most Canadian cable systems dropped WLBZ after 1996 once American television signals became available to them by satellite, with the last one doing so in 2010. Although a "flash-cut" to digital on VHF channel 8 was considered, it was instead decided to return the W57AQ license to the Federal Communications Commission (FCC), which deleted it on April 29, 2010.

In 1981, WLBZ radio was sold off, becoming WACZ (it is now WZON); in 1997, the -TV suffix was dropped. In 1998, the Maine Broadcasting System (by this time controlled by the Rines-Thompson family) sold WLBZ and WCSH to the Gannett Company. In 2000, the station essentially began serving as a semi-satellite of WCSH, when commercials and network programming began to be played from Portland. However, as early as 1989, WLBZ had been reducing its personnel and consolidating some internal operations with WCSH.

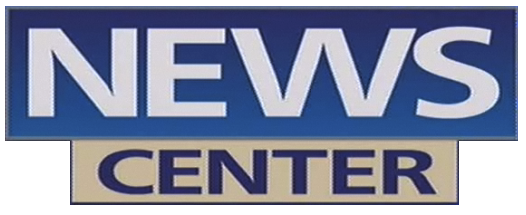
Previous News Center logo used until 2016.

In 2002, WLBZ signed on a digital signal on UHF channel 25, bringing NBC's high definition programming to Eastern and Central Maine. WLBZ's broadcasts became digital-only, effective June 12, 2009. However, the station kept its digital operations on channel 25 until September 10, when it was moved to the VHF channel 2 space previously occupied by the analog service.

In 2012 and 2013, WLBZ's station logo was immortalized in a running sketch series for Saturday Night Live called "Maine Justice", a parody of courtroom shows featuring a judge and a bailiff with Louisiana accents who "try" to act like New Englanders.

On June 29, 2015, the Gannett Company split in two, with one side specializing in print media and the other side specializing in broadcast and digital media. WCSH and WLBZ were retained by the latter company, named Tegna. Nexstar Media Group announced their purchase of Tegna on August 19, 2025; the deal was completed on March 19, 2026, but integration has been halted due to ongoing litigation.

== News operation ==
Originally, WLBZ-TV operated its own news department and produced local newscasts from its Bangor studios. For most of its history, it was a solid, if distant, second in Nielsen ratings behind WABI-TV. In 1989, WLBZ began simulcasting some of WCSH-TV's newscasts prepared with a statewide view. Initially, this was limited to morning, noon, and weekend newscasts; however, on June 26, 2000, WLBZ dropped its 5:30 p.m. newscast in favor of WCSH's newscast, with the 11 p.m. newscast following suit on September 11. WLBZ still aired separate newscasts covering Bangor weeknights at 5 and 6 (which were locally produced at its facilities), with all other newscasts originating from the WCSH studios in Portland. By 2015, the 5 p.m. newscast had also been converted to a simulcast; on October 8, 2015, the 6 p.m. newscast, WLBZ's last standalone newscast, was discontinued and replaced with a WCSH-produced newscast. As mentioned, these statewide programs tend to take on a regional feel with coverage from Portland, Bangor, or wherever news occurs around the state. During the weeknight newscasts, WLBZ still produces its own weather forecast segments from Bangor with meteorologist Steve McKay. On August 9, 2010, there was an expansion of the statewide weekday morning show to 4:30 with the new segment being called News Center Early Morning Report.

WLBZ and WCSH have used the News Center branding for their newscasts since the 1970s, even before consolidating. Additionally, both stations featured Frank Gari's "Good News" music package from 1986 until October 22, 2008, when it was dropped (except during "Storm Center" coverage) in favor of standardized music and graphics seen on other Gannett stations.

After then-WB affiliate WPXT in Portland shut down its news department in 2002, WLBZ and WCSH entered into a news share agreement with that station resulting in a nightly prime time newscast. Originally called News Center at 10 on Maine's WB 51, it was seen every night for thirty minutes. On weeknights, news and sports segments originated from WCSH's facilities while WLBZ produced the weather segment from its studios. Weekend broadcasts aired entirely from Portland. News Center at 10 was formatted in a similar manner to the statewide shows simulcasted on WLBZ and WCSH except for having a slight Portland focus since WPXT was that market's WB affiliate. In September 2006, the production became known as News Center at 10 on The CW Portland after WPXT switched to The CW. WLBZ's role in the newscast was eliminated on November 6, 2008, when WCSH moved the prime time broadcast to its "News Center Weather Plus" feed and entirely reoriented the newscast to the Portland market (with WLBZ no longer doing the weather forecast). The "News Center Weather Plus" feed on WLBZ-DT2 and the live video on their websites was replaced with the national Weather Plus service. News Center at 10 was eventually canceled by WCSH after a six-year run.

An outdoors and human-interest program called Bill Green's Maine airs Saturday nights at 7 on WCSH and WLBZ. In 2003, WCSH launched 207, a local lifestyle/entertainment magazine-type show which airs weeknights at 7 p.m. on both stations simultaneously. The "207" name comes from Maine's telephone area code.

In October 2005, WLBZ and WCSH began offering NBC Weather Plus on new second digital subchannels. Known as "News Center Weather Plus", the service could also be seen on the websites of both stations through live streaming video and digital cable. In late-December 2008 as a result of Weather Plus closing on a national level, WLBZ-DT2 and WCSH-DT2 shifted to a format featuring a loop of local news headlines and weather forecasts. The service retained the "News Center Weather Plus" branding and digital cable carriage but the online live video was dropped. WCSH's weeknight meteorologist Joe Cupo can sometimes be seen on "News Center Weather Plus" providing statewide weather forecasts. Like the main signal, WGCI offers "News Center Weather Plus" on its second digital subchannel. As of February 2014, the channel no longer broadcasts on television.

In addition to the main studios in Bangor and Portland, WLBZ and WCSH share two bureaus in the state. This includes the Midcoast Bureau (on Camden Street/US 1) in Rockport and the Lewiston–Auburn Bureau (on Main Street/ME 11/ME 100/US 202) in Lewiston.

In January 2018, WLBZ and its sister station WCSH rebranded their newscasts under the News Center Maine moniker.

On June 1, 2020, WLBZ and WCSH premiered an hour-long weekday newscast at 4 p.m.

== Technical information ==
=== Subchannels ===
The station's signal is multiplexed:

Subchannels of WLBZ and WGCI-LD
Subchannel	Res.	Short name	Programming
2.1	1080i	WLBZ-HD	NBC
2.2	480i	Crime	True Crime Network
2.3	480i	Quest	Quest
2.4	480i	Nest	The Nest
2.5	480i	BUSTED	Busted
2.6	480i	GetTV	Great
2.7	480i	QVC	QVC
2.8	480i	HSN	HSN

=== Translator ===
- WGCI-LD 4 Skowhegan
