= Diversified Communications =

American media company

- Company type: Private
- Industry: Business-to-business communications
- Predecessors: Hildreth Broadcasting; Journal Publications
- Founded: 1949; 77 years ago in Portland, Maine
- Founder: Horace Hildreth
- Headquarters: Portland, Maine, United States
- Area served: Worldwide
- Key people: Ted Wirth (President and CEO)
- Products: Trade magazines; Business-to-business exhibitions
- Owner: Hildreth family
- Website: divcom.com

Diversified Communications (doing business as Diversified) is a multimedia company, headquartered in Portland, Maine. The company provides market access, education and information through global, national and regional face-to-face events, digital products and publications.

== History ==
Diversified was founded as Hildreth Broadcasting in 1949 when Horace Hildreth, the former governor of Maine, president of Bucknell University, and future U.S. ambassador to Pakistan, purchased Community Broadcasting Service, owner of Maine's oldest radio station, WABI in Bangor. In 1953, he launched Maine's first TV station, WABI-TV in Bangor.

In 1970, Hildreth Broadcasting entered the publishing and trade show business by merger with Journal Publications, the owner of National Fisherman and FISH EXPO Boston. The merged company became Diversified Communications. In 1972, it formed New England Cablevision which it sold in 2000. The company was also the original owner of Home Theater Network, until Westinghouse Broadcasting bought out a majority stake in the company in 1980.

Throughout the 1980s, Diversified Communications expanded its publishing and trade show business with products in the commercial marine and seafood industries. In 1993, it expanded internationally with the European Seafood Exposition. Diversified continued its international growth with the acquisition of Australia Exhibition Services in 2000, the formation of DBC Canada and the acquisition of UK-based Full Moon Communications in 2002. In 2004 it began to co-produce Kosherfest, a two-day trade show for the kosher-certified until it was discontinued after its last show in 2022. In 2009, Diversified Communications expanded into Hong Kong with the acquisition of Asia Business Events and established a presence in India with the acquisition of Infocast.

On July 15, 2014, the contracts that Diversified Communications had with Dish Network expired. Among the issues Diversified cited included financial terms, customer service issues between the station and Dish Network, and, in Bangor, viewership changes on Dish's part in several counties to another CBS station on account of DMA location (including WGME in the Portland area). After a breakdown on contract talks, which picked up slowly, an agreement was reached on October 8, 2014, allowing both stations to return to Dish Network later that day.

On February 16, 2017, it was announced that WABI-TV and sister station WCJB-TV in Gainesville, Florida would be sold to Gray Television for $85 million, pending FCC approval. It will make WCJB a sister station to WCTV (Gray Television's then-flagship station) in Tallahassee and WJHG-TV and WECP-LD in Panama City, while reuniting WABI-TV with WAGM-TV (which Gray acquired two years prior) in Presque Isle, Maine. The sale was completed on May 1, 2017.

In 2024, Diversified Communications updated its branding to operate under the name "Diversified" as its official doing business as name, introducing a new logo and visual identity. This rebranding coincided with the company's 75th anniversary, celebrating its legacy while positioning the organization for future growth and innovation.

== Properties ==
Today, Diversified operates trade fairs on four continents, produces trade publications, and owns several digital businesses. SPAR Point Group, which focuses on the 3D imaging technologies sector, is a wholly owned subsidiary of Diversified.

=== Former stations ===
- Stations are arranged in alphabetical order by state and city of license.
- Two boldface asterisks appearing following a station's call letters (**) indicate a station built and signed on by Community Broadcasting Service or Diversified Communications.

Stations owned by Diversified Communications
Media market	State	Station	Purchased	Sold	Notes
Gainesville	Florida	WCJB-TV	1976	2017	
Bangor	Maine	WABI	1949	1993	
Bangor	Maine	WABI-TV **	1953	2017	
Bangor	Maine	WYOU-FM **	1961	1993	(Note: Known as WABI-FM prior to 1973 and as WBGW from 1973 to 1986.)
Houlton	Maine	WABM	1957	1959	
Portland	Maine	WMTW **	1954	1964	(Note: Owned by Mount Washington Television, whose ownership partially overlapped with Community Broadcasting Service.)
Portland	Maine	WPOR	1958	1971	
Portland	Maine	WPOR-FM **	1967	1971	
Presque Isle	Maine	WAGM	1957	1981	
Presque Isle	Maine	WAGM-TV	1957	1984	
Mount Washington	New Hampshire	WMTW-FM **	1958	1964	
New Bern–Greenville–Washington	North Carolina	WCTI-TV	1986	1993	
Scranton–Wilkes-Barre	Pennsylvania	WYOU	1986	1996	
Florence–Myrtle Beach	South Carolina	WPDE-TV	1985	2006	
Florence–Myrtle Beach	South Carolina	WWMB	1994	2006	(Note: Owned by Atlantic Media Group, but operated by Diversified from its sign on in 1994 until 2006.)
