= WBGR-LD =

Television station in Bangor–Dedham, Maine

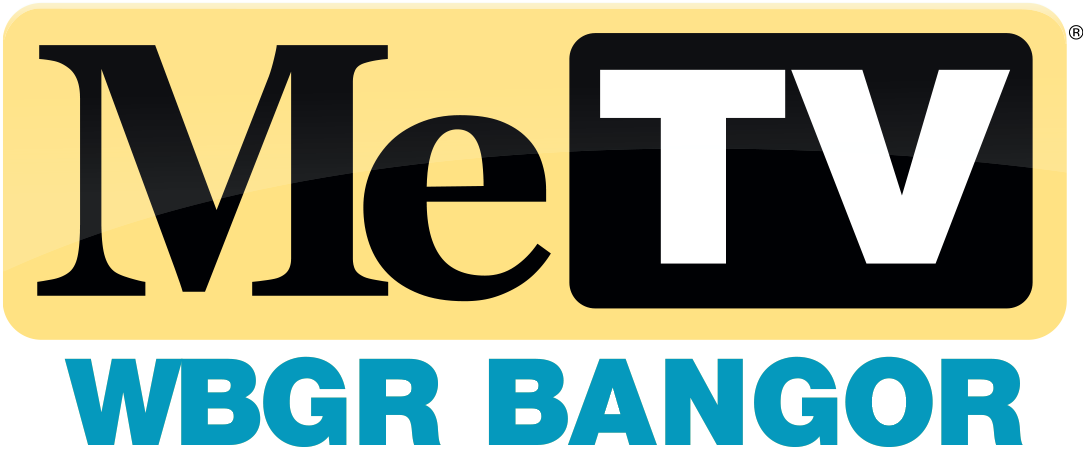
- Bangor–Dedham, Maine; United States
- Channels: Digital: 18 (UHF); Virtual: 18
- Branding: WBGR

Programming
- Affiliations: see § Subchannels

Ownership
- Owner: James McLeod; (Maine Family Broadcasting, Inc.)

History
- First air date: August 28, 1995
- Former call signs: W33BD (1992–1995); WBGR-LP (1995–2019)
- Former channel numbers: Analog: 33 (UHF, 1995–2019); Virtual: 33 (2019–2022)
- Former affiliations: The WB (1995–1999); Liberty Channel; World Harvest; Ion Television (1998–2014); Retro TV (until April 2014)
- Call sign meaning: IATA airport code for Bangor International Airport

Technical information
- Licensing authority: FCC
- Facility ID: 33959
- Class: LD
- ERP: 1 kW
- HAAT: 68 m (223 ft)
- Transmitter coordinates: 44°52′44″N 68°52′55.7″W

Links
- Public license information: LMS

WBGR-LD (channel 18) is a low-power television station licensed to both Bangor and Dedham, Maine, United States, affiliated with MeTV. The station is owned by James McLeod, and maintains studios and transmitter facilities on Ohio Street in Glenburn, Maine.

== History ==
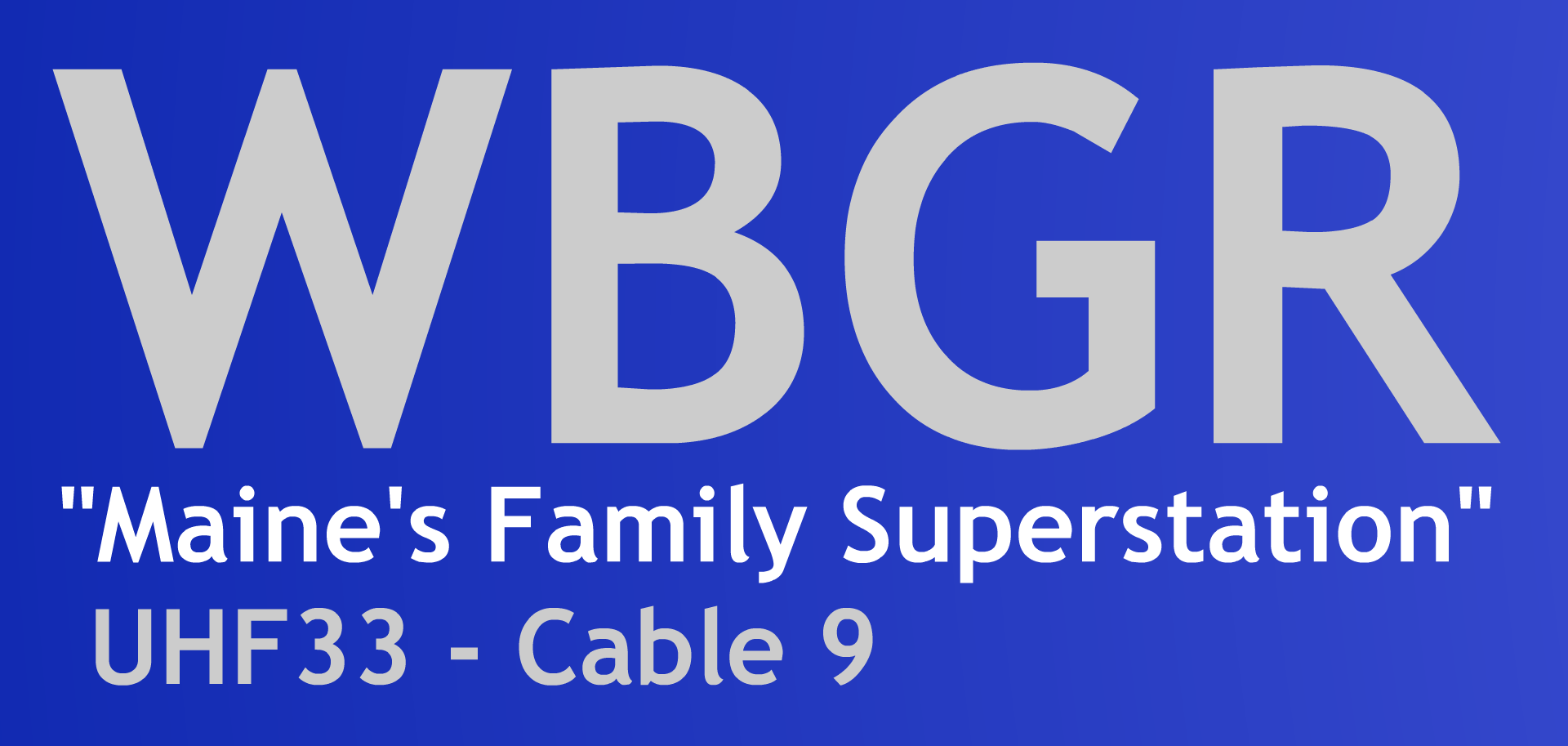
Former logo of the television station

WBGR first went on the air on August 28, 1995, as Bangor's WB affiliate. It was the first commercial UHF station in the market and the first new commercial station locally built in over 30 years. In 1998, The WB created a cable-only channel for its smaller markets (known as "WBAN" in Bangor); while WBGR initially retained its WB affiliation, it also added programming from the Pax (now Ion Television) network, which launched at that time. In 1999, WBGR phased out WB programming and added more Pax programming; by this point, it was one of five over-the-air small-market WB affiliates. The change left Bangor without a WB affiliate, as Adelphia Cable did not launch "WBAN" at the time.

WBGR has aired local programming from local churches, civic organizations and high school sports at various times during its history. The station also carried late afternoon college football games from CBS, as WABI-TV (channel 5) chose to preempt football in order to air a local 6 p.m. newscast. WBGR also aired Boston Red Sox baseball games in 2002, syndicated from WFXT. Daytime programming was filled with family-oriented programming as well as religious programming from several leading Bible teachers. In 2010, Liberty University's Flames Sports Network began airing live sporting events, as well as daily convocation services.

In April 2014, WBGR-LP became an affiliate of MeTV.

== Technical information ==
=== Subchannels ===
The station's signal is multiplexed:

Subchannels of WBGR-LD
| Channel | Res. | Short name | Programming |
|---|---|---|---|
| 18.1 | 480i | | (Blank) (4:3) |
| 18.2 | 480i | | (Blank) (4:3) |
| 18.3 | 480i | | MeTV (4:3) |
| 18.4 | 480i | | Heroes & Icons (4:3) |
| 18.5 | 480i | | Movies! (4:3) |
| 18.8 | 480i | | Start TV (4:3) |

The station was issued its license for digital operation on March 12, 2015. By early September 2019, WBGR-LD commenced digital operations, adding Heroes & Icons and Antenna TV programming to their second digital subchannel. By November of that year, RabbitEars.Info listed six new feeds (LD3 through LD8) for WBGR-LD, those new feeds remaining blank at first.
