= Dedham, Maine =

Town in Maine, United States

- Town
- Location within Maine Location within the United States
- Coordinates: 44°43′26″N 68°35′23″W
- Country: United States
- State: Maine
- County: Hancock
- Villages: Dedham; Green Lake; Lucerne-in-Maine

Area
  - Total: 44.38 sq mi (114.94 km^{2})
  - Land: 39.33 sq mi (101.86 km^{2})
  - Water: 5.05 sq mi (13.08 km^{2})
- Elevation: 597 ft (182 m)

Population (2020)
  - Total: 1,648
  - Density: 42/sq mi (16.2/km^{2})
- Time zone: UTC-5 (Eastern (EST))
  - Summer (DST): UTC-4 (EDT)
- ZIP Code: 04429
- Area code: 207
- FIPS code: 23-16935
- GNIS feature ID: 582436
- Website: www.dedhamme.org

Dedham is a town in Hancock County, Maine, United States. The population was 1,648 at the 2020 census. The town includes the site of a Cold War airplane crash on Bald Mountain.

== Geography ==
According to the United States Census Bureau, the town has a total area of 44.38 square miles (114.94 km^{2}), of which 39.33 square miles (101.86 km^{2}) is land and 5.05 square miles (13.08 km^{2}) is water.

The small village corporation of Lucerne-in-Maine lies in a summer resort area along Phillips Lake near the center of the town. It is part of Dedham but has limited taxing and regulatory authority separate from the town's. The Lucerne-in-Maine Village Corp. was established in 1927 to give part-time residents a voice in how the village was run. In 2017 the village considered dissolving, but continues as a quasi-municipal corporation as of January 2025.

== History ==
Dedham, Maine, was named after Dedham, Massachusetts. The town was first settled in 1810 by Nathan Phillips, for whom Phillips Lake is named.

=== 1961 F-101 Voodoo crash ===
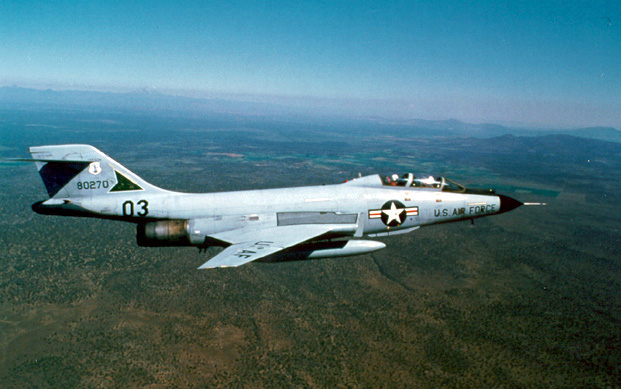
F-101B fighter similar to the one which crashed on Bald Mountain

Two McDonnell F-101 Voodoo fighters of the 75th Fighter Squadron were scrambled from Dow Air Force Base on the night of April 11, 1961, to intercept an unidentified aircraft approaching the United States. SAGE identified the incoming aircraft as a Strategic Air Command bomber shortly after the fighters were airborne. The fighters' return to Dow was complicated by a light spring rainstorm, creating an icy runway under a 500-foot cloud ceiling. Dow's tactical air navigation system glide slope function was temporarily disabled after the first aircraft landed. The second aircraft was cleared to descend to 2,200 feet, using a two-dimensional radar approach, when it hit Bald Mountain at an elevation of 1,200 feet. Both crewmen in the second aircraft were killed. Investigators concluded the airfield elevation had been incorrectly set on the aircraft altimeter, creating a 1000-foot error unrecognized when aircrew acknowledged only the last two digits of altimeter readings in radio transmissions.

== Demographics ==
Historical population
Census	Pop.	Note	%±
1840	455		—
1850	546		20.0%
1860	495		−9.3%
1870	448		−9.5%
1880	406		−9.4%
1890	366		−9.9%
1900	327		−10.7%
1910	353		8.0%
1920	286		−19.0%
1930	279		−2.4%
1940	293		5.0%
1950	374		27.6%
1960	438		17.1%
1970	522		19.2%
1980	841		61.1%
1990	1,229		46.1%
2000	1,422		15.7%
2010	1,681		18.2%
2020	1,648		−2.0%
U.S. Decennial Census

=== 2010 census ===
As of the census of 2010, there were 1,681 people, 702 households, and 491 families living in the town. The population density was 42.7 inhabitants per square mile (16.5/km^{2}). There were 1,254 housing units at an average density of 31.9 per square mile (12.3/km^{2}). The racial makeup of the town was 97.6% (1,640) White, 0.4% (6) African American, 0.5% (8)Native American, 0.6% (10) Asian, 0.2% (3) from other races, and 0.8% (13) from two or more races. Hispanic or Latino people of any race were 0.8% (13) of the population.

There were 702 households, of which 26.6% had children under the age of 18 living with them, 58.1% were married couples living together, 7.8% had a female householder with no husband present, 4.0% had a male householder with no wife present, and 30.1% were non-families. 21.2% of all households were made up of individuals, and 5.9% had someone living alone who was 65 years of age or older. The average household size was 2.39 and the average family size was 2.76.

The median age in the town was 46.2 years. 19.3% of residents were under the age of 18; 5.5% were between the ages of 18 and 24; 23.1% were from 25 to 44; 40.3% were from 45 to 64; and 11.8% were 65 years of age or older. The gender makeup of the town was 51.5% male and 48.5% female.

=== 2000 census ===
As of the census of 2000, there were 1,422 people, 564 households, and 412 families living in the town. The population density was 36.2 inhabitants per square mile (14.0/km^{2}). There were 1,055 housing units at an average density of 26.9 per square mile (10.4/km^{2}). The racial makeup of the town was 98.17% White, 0.28% African American, 0.35% Native American, 0.49% Asian, 0.14% from other races, and 0.56% from two or more races. Hispanic or Latino people of any race were 0.35% of the population.

There were 564 households, out of which 35.5% had children under the age of 18 living with them, 59.9% were married couples living together, 8.7% had a female householder with no husband present, and 26.8% were non-families. 18.8% of all households were made up of individuals, and 5.5% had someone living alone who was 65 years of age or older. The average household size was 2.52 and the average family size was 2.86.

In the town, the population was spread out, with 24.2% under the age of 18, 5.4% from 18 to 24, 33.3% from 25 to 44, 27.4% from 45 to 64, and 9.6% who were 65 years of age or older. The median age was 40 years. For every 100 females, there were 105.8 males. For every 100 females age 18 and over, there were 102.6 males.

The median income for a household in the town was $47,917, and the median income for a family was $52,917. Males had a median income of $35,052 versus $29,028 for females. The per capita income for the town was $22,975. About 3.4% of families and 5.2% of the population were below the poverty line, including 5.4% of those under age 18 and 9.1% of those age 65 or over.
