= WPXT =

Television station in Portland, Maine

- Portland, Maine; United States
- Channels: Digital: 34 (UHF); Virtual: 51
- Branding: Maine's CW

Programming
- Affiliations: 51.1: The CW; for others, see § Subchannels

Ownership
- Owner: Hearst Television; (Hearst Properties Inc.)
- Sister stations: WMTW

History
- Founded: August 22, 1983
- First air date: September 14, 1986
- Former call signs: WHSI (CP only, 1983–1985)
- Former channel numbers: Analog: 51 (UHF, 1986–2008); Digital: 43 (UHF, until 2020)
- Former affiliations: Independent (September–October 1986); Fox (October 1986–2001); The WB (2001–2006)
- Call sign meaning: "We're Portland's Exciting Television"

Technical information
- Licensing authority: FCC
- Facility ID: 53065
- ERP: 500 kW
- HAAT: 590.4 m (1,937 ft)
- Transmitter coordinates: 43°50′44″N 70°45′41″W

Links
- Public license information: Public file; LMS
- Website: wmtw.com/cw

WPXT (channel 51) is a television station in Portland, Maine, United States, affiliated with The CW. It is owned by Hearst Television alongside ABC affiliate WMTW (channel 8). The two stations share studios on Ledgeview Drive in Westbrook; WPXT's transmitter is located in West Baldwin, Maine.

== History ==
The station signed on September 14, 1986, as Maine's first independent station and the first new commercial station to launch in the Portland market in 32 years. After a few weeks as an independent, it became a charter affiliate with Fox on October 9. In 1996, the station's original owner, Bride Communications, entered bankruptcy and WPXT was sold to Pegasus Broadcasting.

On October 7, 2001, WPXT switched to The WB; the deal, which also included WDBD in Jackson, Mississippi, came after renewal negotiations between Fox and Pegasus broke down. A Fox spokesman said that the two stations "were not honoring the terms and conditions of the affiliate agreement", an assertion denied by WPXT staff. The WB had previously aired in off-hours on sister UPN affiliate WPME (channel 35). The affiliation change left Maine with no over-the-air Fox affiliate until April 2003, when Portland's Pax TV affiliate WMPX-TV (now WPFO) switched to the network and WFVX-LP signed on as the first over-the-air Fox affiliate for the Bangor area. In the interim, Fox's prime time and children's programming was only available on cable in the state via Foxnet; WCKD-LP carried the network's sports programming for Bangor during that time after attempting to change affiliations from UPN.

Pegasus declared bankruptcy in June 2004 over a dispute with DirecTV (then co-owned with Fox by News Corporation) over marketing of the direct broadcast satellite service in rural areas. The Pegasus station group was sold in August 2006 to private investment firm CP Media, LLC of Wilkes-Barre, Pennsylvania, for $55.5 million. Eventually, CP Media formed a new broadcast company, New Age Media.

As a WB affiliate, WPXT was originally branded on-air as "Maine's WB 51", but in 2004, changed to "Maine's WB" to reflect its status as the only over-the-air WB affiliate in the state. Although Bangor and Presque Isle also had affiliates, they were only provided on cable through The WB 100+ (a similar operation to Foxnet).

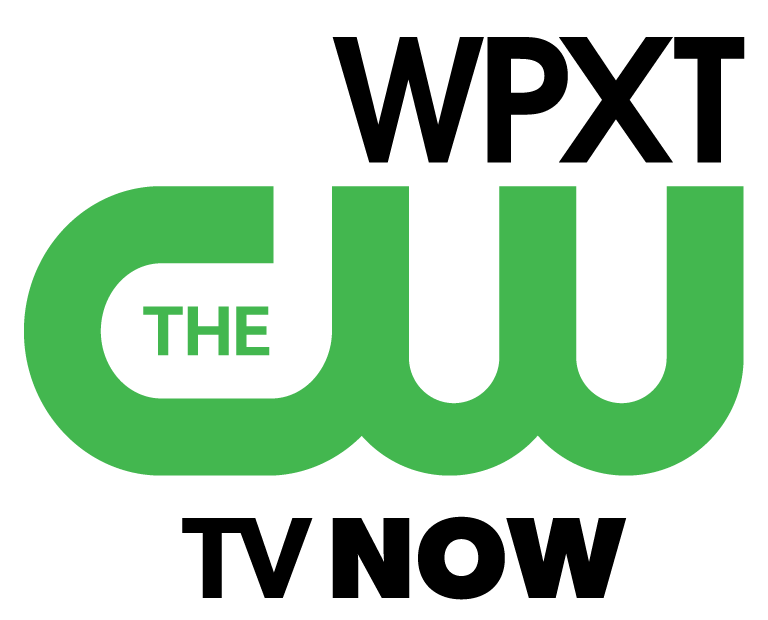
WPXT's logo from 2007 to 2018

On January 24, 2006, Time Warner and CBS Corporation announced that they would merge the broadcast operations of The WB and UPN to form The CW Television Network. On March 9, it was announced WPXT would become Portland's CW affiliate. Later on May 1, it was made public sister station WPME would affiliate with MyNetworkTV. With the new affiliation, WPXT's branding became "The CW Portland". In 2007, WPXT changed its on-air branding to reflect its call letters rather than a city.

WPXT ceased analog transmission August 12, 2008, more than seven months prior to the original Federal Communications Commission (FCC) digital switchover deadline of February 17, 2009, due to transmitter failure. On May 2, 2011, WPXT signed on a new second digital subchannel to become the area's MeTV affiliate. On November 7, 2016, Escape (now Ion Mystery) was added to subchannel 51.3.

New Age Media announced in March 2012 that it would sell WPXT to Tyche Broadcasting for $75,000. The deal was contingent on WPME's concurrent sale from MPS Media to Triumph Broadcasting. On November 9, 2012, WPXT filed a non-consummation notice to the FCC, meaning the transaction is nulled and void. On February 13, 2013, New Age Media filed to sell WPXT to Ironwood Communications for $1,525,000; the deal was concurrent with a planned sale of WPME to Cottonwood Communications. The FCC granted its approval of the sale on April 2. The sale was consummated on May 20.

Former "WPME" logo

On March 22, 2018, MyNetworkTV, Escape and Laff programming was moved to WPXT's respective third, fourth and fifth subchannels; the three networks had been carried by WPME, which was concurrently sold to Ion Media Networks to become WIPL, an Ion Television owned-and-operated station. Hearst Television announced its acquisition of WPXT on July 30, 2018; the $3,350,000 purchase created a duopoly with ABC affiliate WMTW (channel 8). The sale was approved on September 12 and was completed on September 21, 2018; concurrently, WPXT changed its branding to "Maine's CW".

The ownership change also resulted in a streamlining of subchannels between WMTW and WPXT the next month. With Hearst's preference for its main station in the market to carry the MeTV affiliation, MeTV and H&I exchanged places, with MeTV moving to WMTW-DT2 and H&I going to WPXT-DT2, and Laff going from WPXT-DT2 to WMTW-DT3, with Escape going to WPXT-DT3 (and the likely non-renewal of the Katz Broadcasting network agreement; Hearst only tends to carry Bounce TV from that provider). The syndicated programming formerly on WPXT-DT3's "WPME" service was removed, and MyNetworkTV programming now airs in place of H&I's prime time, an arrangement similar to the setup for the third subchannel of sister station KCCI in Des Moines, Iowa. In 2025, WPXT reached an agreement with the Boston Red Sox to air four spring training games.

== News operation ==
=== Early in-house newscasts ===
In 1992, WPXT announced the formation of a news department, with plans to launch a 10 p.m. newscast on June 11. For a time, the newscast was simulcast on sister station WPME. WPXT also produced a weeknight broadcast at 7 on that station at one point but the show was eventually canceled due to poor ratings and inconsistent viewership. WPXT's newscast made national headlines a week before the 2000 Presidential election when reporter Erin Fehlau (now at ABC affiliate WMUR-TV) revealed Republican candidate George W. Bush had been convicted for driving under the influence of alcohol 24 years earlier. For her reporting, Fehlau won the National Clarion Award, and the station won a regional Edward R. Murrow Award. The news operation, which was rebranded from Fox 51 News to Our Maine News after WPXT's affiliation change, was closed on June 15, 2002.

=== News Center at 10 ===
After shuttering its own news operation, in September 2002 WPXT entered into a news share agreement with Maine's two NBC affiliates, WCSH and WLBZ (owned by Tegna Inc., which at the time was the broadcasting arm of the Gannett Company). This arrangement resulted in a nightly half-hour prime time show at 10 to debut on the station on October 21, known as NewsCenter at 10 on Maine's WB 51. On weeknights, the news and sports segments originated from WCSH's studios at Congress Square in downtown Portland while weather forecast segments came from WLBZ's facility on Mount Hope Avenue in Bangor. Weekend broadcasts aired entirely from Portland. The WPXT newscast featured a similar format to newscasts that were simulcast on both WCSH and WLBZ (which largely serves as a semi-satellite of WCSH), with statewide news from both the Portland and Bangor markets. However, since WPXT is a Portland/Auburn market station, there was ultimately a focus on southern areas. With the affiliation switch to The CW in 2006, WPXT's news became known as NewsCenter at 10 on The CW Portland.

WPXT would not face any competition in the time slot until February 5, 2007, when current Fox affiliate WPFO entered into a similar arrangement with CBS affiliate WGME-TV. On November 6, 2008, WCSH moved the WPXT show to its second digital subchannel affiliated with NBC Weather Plus. As a result, WLBZ's production involvement in the newscast was dropped and refocused to Portland. After a six-year run, the production was eventually canceled altogether.

On October 31, 2011, WPXT and WCSH established another news share agreement and debuted an hour-long extension of the big three outlet's weekday morning show. Known on WPXT as NewsCenter Morning Report Xtra, this aired from 7 to 8 a.m. and competed with WGME's one-hour morning newscast on WPFO. It was a rebroadcast of WCSH's 6–7 a.m. show with WPXT inserting its own commercials. This ceased in spring 2014. In 2015, WMTW would move their operations from the Time and Temperature Building and into the same building WPXT/WPME operated from; WPXT's former news studio and newsroom had been subdivided and available for lease in subsequent years.

=== News 8 on Maine's CW ===
Following WPXT's sale to Hearst Television, the station announced that a WMTW-produced prime time newscast would premiere on September 24, 2018. A WMTW-produced Saturday 7 p.m. newscast debuted on August 31, 2019, and continued through the conclusion of ABC's college football coverage which necessitated the preemption of WMTW's usual 6 p.m. newscast. The WPXT Saturday newscast moved to 6 p.m. for the 2020 college football season.

== Subchannels ==
The station's signal is multiplexed:

Subchannels of WPXT
Subchannel	Res.	Short name	Programming
51.1	1080i	MAINECW	The CW
51.2	480i	H&I	Heroes & Icons (primary); MyNetworkTV (secondary)
51.3	480i	MYS	Ion Mystery (4:3)
51.4	480i	STORY	Story Television
51.5	480i	QVC	QVC (4:3)

Subchannel broadcast with MPEG-4 video
