= Black Cap Mountain =

Mountain in Maine, United States of America

- Location within Maine

Highest point
- Elevation: 1,020 ft (310 m)
- Prominence: 570 ft (170 m)
- Coordinates: 44°45′13″N 68°33′58″W

Geography
- Location: Penobscot County, Maine, U.S.

Climbing
- Easiest route: Hiking, class 1

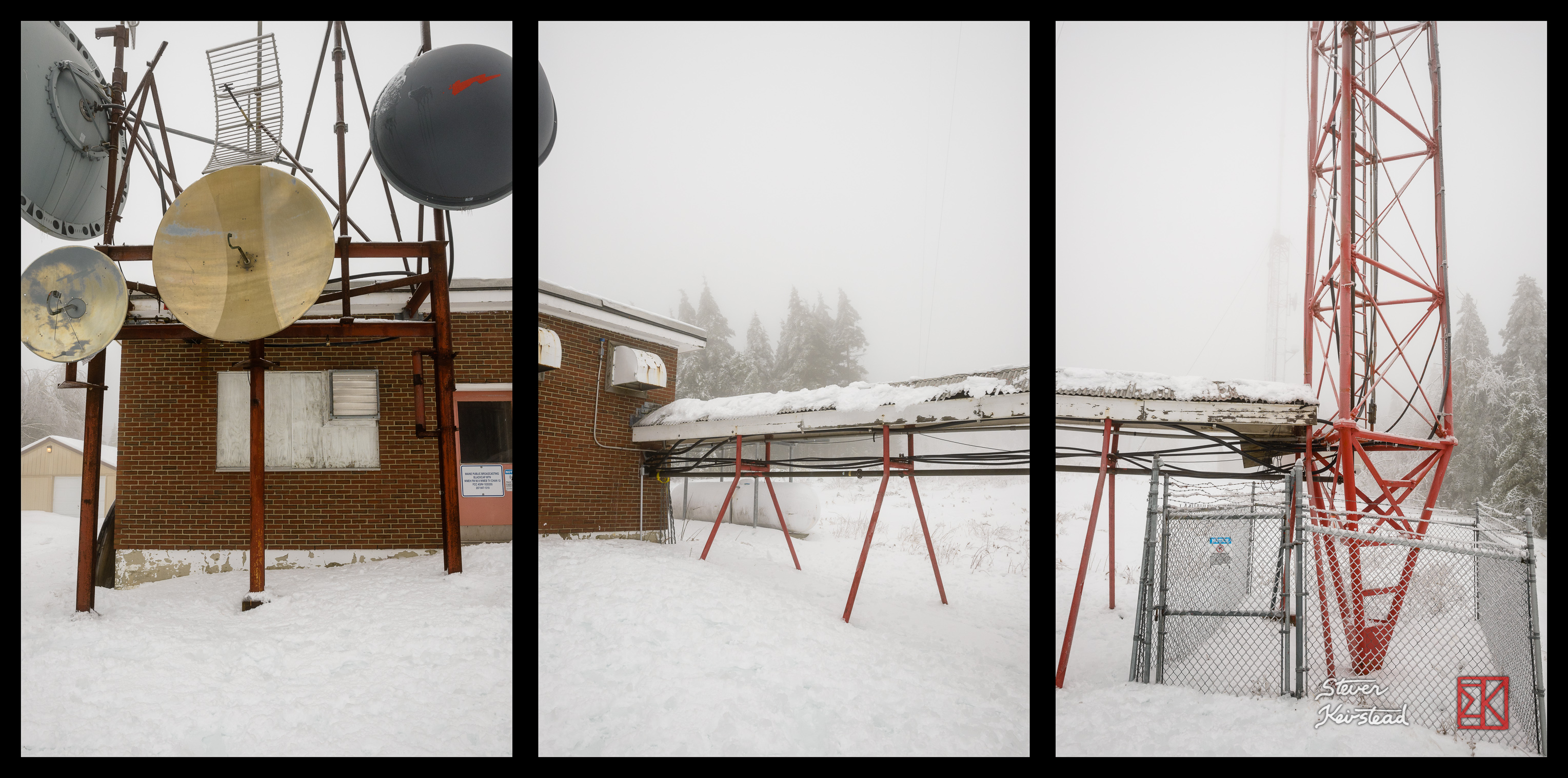
Maine Public Broadcasting Network transmitter atop Black Cap Mountain

Black Cap Mountain is a 1,020 foot (310 m) mountain in Penobscot County, Maine, United States. The mountain is 5 miles (8.0 km) southeast of Eddington, Maine, and the Penobscot River. It is accessible from Maine Route 46, near its intersection with The Airline (State Route 9).

The mountain is named for its granite peak, which is mostly bare with a few scrubby trees. From the mountain there is a panoramic view of western Maine, the Western Maine Mountains, and the eastern portion of the White Mountain National Forest.

== Background ==
Black Cap consists of a range of hills, approximately 1.5 miles (2.4 km) long, with an average breadth of 0.5 miles (0.80 km) wide. Both Boy Scout Camp Roosevelt and Fitts Pond sit at the base of the mountain. The summit is home to a number of microwave, radio and television broadcasting antennas, including WMEH of Maine Public Radio.

The mountain is prominent in the area and is part of the southeastern vista of Bangor. It can also be seen from the Penobscot Bay and the sea. The area around the mountain has been affected by several natural disasters. The 1938 New England hurricane leveled the surrounding forest, and a spruce forest was planted in its place. The mountain also has beech trees and blueberry bushes. The latter began to grow after a series of forest fires swept through the area in the 1800s clearing the forest and opening the land.

The Katahdin Area Council, owners of the 1,800 acres (730 ha) Camp Roosevelt, own two-thirds of the mountain. Private landholders own the rest of the land, with energy company Emera owning one acre on the summit of the mountain for a radio tower.

== Recreation ==
The mountain has a popular hiking trail, whose trailhead adjoins the parking lot for Camp Roosevelt.

== See also ==
- Davis Pond
