= WZON =

Radio station in Bangor, Maine, United States

Currently silent
- Bangor, Maine; United States
- Broadcast area: Penobscot County, Maine
- Frequency: 620 kHz

Ownership
- Owner: Mix Maine Media; (J. Hanson Company, Inc.)
- Sister stations: WBAN; WGUY; WZLO

History
- First air date: December 30, 1926
- Former call signs: WLBZ (1926–1981); WACZ (1981–1983)
- Call sign meaning: The Dead Zone

Technical information
- Licensing authority: FCC
- Facility ID: 66674
- Class: B
- Power: 5,000 watts (day); 620 watts (night)
- Transmitter coordinates: 44°49′47.25″N 68°47′0.13″W

Links
- Public license information: Public file; LMS

WZON (620 AM) is a commercial radio station licensed to Bangor, Maine, United States, and serves Central Maine, that is currently silent. WZON is owned by Mix Maine Media, through licensee J. Hanson Company; the company also owns WZLO and programs WBAN and WGUY in the Bangor area.

WZON is one of Maine's oldest radio stations, first signing on the air in 1926 as WLBZ in Dover-Foxcroft. It moved to Bangor in 1928. The station became WACZ in 1981, and after its 1983 purchase by Stephen King, was renamed WZON after his novel The Dead Zone. King formed the Zone Corporation with his wife Tabitha King to manage the station. After briefly, and unsuccessfully, running WZON as a non-commercial station, Stephen King sold WZON in 1990 but repurchased it out of bankruptcy in 1993. Carrying various spoken word formats during King's ownership, including talk, sports and progressive talk, WZON carried a classic hits format as "Z62" from 2018 onward; this was a throwback to a Top 40 format also known as "Z62" heard over the station from 1978 to 1988. King closed WZON and WZLO on December 31, 2024, due to ongoing financial losses; Mix Maine Media acquired the two stations in 2025.

== History ==
WZON is one of the oldest radio stations in Maine. The station signed on December 30, 1926, as WLBZ, owned by Thompson L. Guernsey and operating from Dover-Foxcroft. The station grew out of an experimental radio station, 1EE, that had been licensed to Guernsey in 1921; WLBZ's first broadcast, using modified 1EE equipment, originated from Guernsey's home, in the harness room of the chicken house. In 1928, the station moved from 1440 kHz to 620 kHz and relocated to Bangor, occupying studios in the Andrews Music House previously used by WABI. The following year, the station was transferred to Maine Broadcasting Company, which was controlled by Guernsey, and opened a studio in Waterville. WLBZ became a CBS affiliate by 1930; it was the network's first affiliate in Maine. In 1939, it switched to NBC. Guernsey closed the Waterville studio in 1935 for financial reasons, but reestablished a presence in the city in 1938.

Guernsey first attempted to sell the station to the Rines family, owner of WCSH in Portland, in 1938; Rines was seeking to assemble a statewide network of stations. Guernsey did not complete the deal, leading the Federal Communications Commission (FCC) to dismiss the application on June 18, 1940. However, in 1944, to help pay off an outstanding note, Guernsey was forced to sell WLBZ at auction to the Rines-controlled Eastland Broadcasting Company. A television sister station was added in 1958, when the Rines' Maine Broadcasting Company acquired WTWO (channel 2) and renamed it WLBZ-TV.

By 1973, WLBZ had a middle-of-the-road music format; on September 1, 1975, this gave way to an all-news format via NBC's News and Information Service (NIS). WLBZ returned to its a modified version of its previous format, featuring more "uptempo" songs, on May 16, 1977, ahead of NBC's closure of NIS; station manager Edward Owen told the Bangor Daily News that Bangor did not have the population density to sustain an all-news format, noting that WCSH in Portland would continue as an all-news station locally. The change came a week after WLBZ radio and WLBZ-TV, along with WCSH radio and WCSH-TV, began jointing promoting themselves as "NewsCenter".

In February 1978, the station transitioned to a top 40 format as "Z-62"; the change was completed on March 1. The change put WLBZ in direct competition with existing top 40 station WGUY; that station's owner, Stone Communications, would sue Maine Broadcasting in 1979 over WLBZ's hiring of four former WGUY staffers in connection to the format change. WLBZ, which had been one of Bangor's lowest-rated stations, rose to the top of the ratings as a top 40 station, while WGUY's ratings declined.

The Maine Broadcasting System decided to sell their radio stations in the early 1980s to focus on their television properties; as early as 1979, the Acton, Massachusetts–based Acton Corporation had expressed interest in acquiring WLBZ radio, which was described as "not making any money". The $550,000 sale to Acton, which also owned WMYD in Wickford, Rhode Island, was reached in 1980; the following year, Acton changed the call sign to WACZ, though the "Z-62" branding remained in place.

On May 26, 1983, writer Stephen King announced his intention to purchase WACZ from Acton. The $575,000 deal put the station under the ownership of the Zone Corporation, which King formed with his wife Tabitha and his business advisor Arthur Greene; King had planned on calling the company the Christine Corporation (after his then most-recent novel), but the name was already in use by a Maine corporation. King announced that he would change WACZ's call sign to WZON, but pledged no other immediate changes; he also vowed that he did not intend to run the money-losing station as a tax loss. The sale was completed on the night of October 31.

Though WZON attracted a loyal audience, it was financially unsuccessful, leading King to lay off the station's airstaff in late 1987 and consider selling or closing WZON. After reconsidering this plan, on September 1, 1988, the station—still branded "Z-62" and by then focused on rock 'n' roll and blues—was transferred to Bangor Public Communications, headed by King, and began operating on a noncommercial basis. Under this model, WZON asked for contributions from its listeners, similar to public radio stations. King indicated that he had long planned to start a commercial-free rock 'n' roll station.

King sold the station to Dr. John Tozer in 1990, in a $185,750 deal. Tozer, a Bangor dentist, returned WZON to commercial operation that August with a talk and sports format, including CBS Radio Network newscasts and features. It was the first station in Bangor to carry Rush Limbaugh.

WZON remained unprofitable, and after two years Tozer sold the station to Nancy E. Boyd's NEB Communications. Danny C. Lennon, reported to be Boyd's husband, then began managing the station. WZON's financial problems continued, with employees' paychecks bouncing and NEB falling behind on payments to both Tozer and King (who still owned the station's studios), and within months the station was forced into bankruptcy. Lennon had previously been convicted of mail fraud in Connecticut in 1990. In March 1993, a bankruptcy court judge approved a sale of the station back to King, again through the Zone Corporation.

In August 1993, Stephen King began to shift WZON to an all-sports format as "The Sports Zone"; the last non-sports shows, including Limbaugh and Larry King, were dropped in January 1994. Some of WZON's talk programs, including Limbaugh and local morning show Leo and Paul, moved to FM station WSNV, which eventually became WVOM. WZON again dropped its affiliation with NBC Radio in 1999, switching to ABC News Radio.

Stephen King expanded his Bangor-area radio holdings in 1995, when he purchased WKIT-FM and WNSW (the former WGUY) in Brewer from H & L Broadcasting. After WNSW shut down on October 24, 1995, Boston Bruins hockey joined the WZON lineup. In 2001, the Kings purchased WDME-FM in Dover-Foxcroft from Mid-Maine Media; that station began simulcasting WZON by March 2009, and changed its call sign to WZON-FM that August.

WZON-FM broke away from the simulcast of WZON (AM) to launch a progressive talk format, "The Pulse", on January 4, 2010. The AM station also began carrying the progressive talk lineup on November 1, 2010, replacing ESPN Radio programming. WZON retained its local sports broadcasts including Boston Celtics basketball. The morning show hosts were also retained, hosting an afternoon show on the AM side only, but were let go in May 2012 due to the station "losing too much money".

Initially, "The Pulse" carried CNN Radio newscasts; after CNN stopped providing radio newscasts on March 31, 2012, WZON switched to NBC News Radio, returning NBC-branded newscasts to the station for the first time in 13 years. WZON-FM dropped the progressive talk format in November 2012 (becoming WZLO), with the format continuing on the AM station. Outside of drive time, WZON's progressive talk format largely relied on nationally syndicated programs, including Thom Hartmann, Bill Press, Leslie Marshall, Marilu Henner, Clark Howard and Overnight America with Jon Grayson. After NBC News Radio shut down, WZON returned to its roots as an affiliate of the CBS Radio Network.

In November 2013, a construction permit was issued to David Stout for an FM translator, W252CT (98.3), that would relay WZON; the Zone Corporation purchased this permit for $80,000 in March 2014. By the end of 2014, WZON's programming had been replaced on W252CT by WZLO, via the second HD Radio channel of WKIT.

Logo as "Z62 Retro Radio", 2018–2024

WZON dropped the progressive talk format in February 2018 and returned to the "Z62" branding with an oldies format; the station retained its afternoon talk show and simulcasts of WABI-TV newscasts. Prior to the format change, the station had been running "Z62 Throwback Weekends", offering a similar mix of music to the full-time oldies format. By 2022, the station shifted its format to classic hits.

On December 2, 2024, King would announce that WZON and its sister stations would shut down at the end of the month, citing continued financial losses and his own old age. While King subsequently reached a deal to sell WKIT to Jeff Solari (a former WZON afternoon host) and Greg Hawes' Rock Lobster Radio, WZON or WZLO were not included in the sale, and their December 31 closure went forward. WZON announced that its tower was slated to be dismantled in a DX test broadcast on December 22, 2024, effectively ruling out any uninterrupted transfer of ownership. Afternoon talk show host Rich Kimball announced that he would relaunch his Downtown show as a podcast in January 2025.

In February 2025, the Zone Corporation agreed to sell WZON, WZLO, and W252CT to J Hanson's Mix Maine Media, operator of WBAN and WGUY in Veazie and owner of WFMX and WSKW in Skowhegan and WCTB in Fairfield. As part of the $125,000 deal, $75,000 would be donated to the Heart of Maine United Way; Hanson also paid for half the cost of removing the WZON and W252CT towers. The WZON tower, which had stood since 1937, was demolished on March 26, 2025. Mix Maine Media completed its acquisition of the stations in April 2025. By October 2025, when it announced its acquisition of WKIT from Rock Lobster Radio, Mix Maine Media indicated that it planned to return WZON and W252CT to the air by the end of the year. In early 2026, Mix Maine Media applied to move the WZON license from Bangor to Norridgewock.

=== Play-by-play coverage ===
As a sports station, WZON broadcast many high school sporting events, American Legion baseball games, Husson University athletic events, Boston Celtics basketball, Boston Red Sox baseball, as well as some Westwood One programming and other local events (such as the Kenduskeag Stream Canoe Race). Since the launch of WEZQ as a sports station in 2013, Celtics basketball, Husson University sports and Westwood One programming has moved to that station. In 2018, WEZQ acquired the rights to the Red Sox; following this move, Stephen King told the Bangor Daily News that "We had the rug pulled out from under us," and said that WZON was "never included in any negotiations with the Red Sox". WZON would reduce its local sports broadcasts following the launch of WEZQ.

WZON was the long-time home of University of Maine sports until the summer of 2007, when the broadcasting rights were reassigned by the University of Maine and its media contractor Learfield Sports to WVOM and WGUY.

=== Contests ===
WZON often ran contests for local listeners, usually giving away tickets to upcoming professional sports events. Prizes often included Boston Red Sox playoff tickets, Boston Celtics playoff tickets, NASCAR event tickets, and more. In addition to these major contests, the local WZON shows included regular trivia segments with less valuable prizes, including pizzas and T-shirts.

== Community involvement ==
WZON participated in the Jimmy Fund radio telethon and auction each summer. The station gathered local and national sports memorabilia and auctioned it off to the highest bidder. Listeners contributed thousands of dollars to the Jimmy Fund through this fund-raising mechanism over the years.

The station also brought Red Sox broadcasters and ESPN personalities to Bangor for special forums.
