= WGUY (disambiguation) =

WGUY is a radio station (1230 AM) licensed to Veazie, Maine.

WGUY may also refer to:

- WNSW (Maine), a defunct radio station (1200 AM) licensed to Brewer, Maine, which held the call sign WGUY from 1947 to 1981
- WKIT, a radio station (100.3 FM) licensed to Brewer, Maine, which held the call sign WGUY from 1979 to 1987
- WHMX, a radio station (105.7 FM) licensed to Lincoln, Maine, which held the call sign WGUY from 1987 to 1989
- WKVZ, a radio station (102.1 FM) licensed to Dexter, Maine, which held the call sign WGUY from 1989 to 2009
