= WGUY =

Radio station in Veazie–Bangor, Maine, United States

Simulcast of WCTB, Fairfield, Maine

Veazie, Maine; United States
- Broadcast area: Bangor, Maine
- Frequency: 1230 kHz
- Branding: True Country

Programming
- Format: Classic country
- Affiliations: Compass Media Networks

Ownership
- Owner: Port Broadcasting, LLC
- Operator: Mix Maine Media
- Sister stations: WBAN; WZLO; WZON

History
- First air date: November 2011
- Call sign meaning: Guy Gannett, founder of the original WGUY (later WNSW)

Technical information
- Licensing authority: FCC
- Facility ID: 160767
- Class: C
- Power: 1,000 watts day; 640 watts night
- Transmitter coordinates: 44°50′50.3″N 68°40′43.1″W
- Translator: 96.1 W241CP (Bangor)

Links
- Public license information: Public file; LMS
- Webcast: Listen live
- Website: truecountry935.com

WGUY (1230 AM) is a radio station licensed to Veazie, Maine, United States. It is owned by Port Broadcasting, LLC, and operated by Mix Maine Media as a simulcast of WCTB, its classic country station in Fairfield.

== History ==
Logo as an oldies station simulcast on 94.1 FM

The station signed on in November 2011 as a simulcast of co-owned WNZS. In May 2012 WGUY broke away from the WNZS simulcast, and began simulcasting on 94.1 FM and broadcasting an oldies format.

WGUY was one of the flagship stations of the Black Bear Sports Network, carrying University of Maine basketball, baseball, and softball. In the event of a conflict between the Maine Black Bears' men's and women's basketball teams, the women's game was relocated to co-owned WBAN (formerly WNZS) or WCYR.

On December 30, 2015, WGUY changed its format from oldies to a simulcast of soft adult contemporary-formatted WRMO (93.7 FM).

On December 1, 2016, with the station being sold to Port Broadcasting, WGUY and W231CH broke the simulcast of WRMO. WGUY reverted to its oldies format and W231CH began simulcasting WBAN, which inherited the soft AC format. WRMO switched to the Maine Public Classical network.

In November 2024, Mix Maine Media began operating WGUY and WBAN under a five-year time brokerage agreement with Port Broadcasting, with an option to buy the stations for $225,000. Mix Maine Media replaced WGUY's "The Legends" oldies format with a simulcast of the classic country programming of WCTB in Fairfield.

== Translator ==
Broadcast translator for WGUY
Call sign	Frequency	City of license	FID	ERP (W)	Class	FCC info
W241CP	96.1 FM	Bangor, Maine	200815	250	D	LMS
