= WKIT (disambiguation) =

WKIT is a radio station (100.3 FM) licensed to Brewer, Maine.

WKIT may also refer to:

- WNSW (Maine), a defunct radio station (1200 AM) licensed to Brewer, Maine, which held the call sign WKIT from 1987 to 1991
- WMYI, a radio station (102.5 FM) licensed to Hendersonville, North Carolina, which held the call sign WKIT from 1958 to 1987
- WJDM, a radio station (1530 AM) licensed to Mineola, New York, which held the call sign WKIT from 1956 to 1958
