= WBAN =

Simulcast of WFMX, Waterville, Maine
- Veazie, Maine; United States
- Broadcast area: Bangor area
- Frequency: 1340 kHz
- Branding: The Mix

Programming
- Format: Adult contemporary
- Affiliations: ABC News Radio; Compass Media Networks; Premiere Networks

Ownership
- Owner: Port Broadcasting, LLC
- Operator: Mix Maine Media
- Sister stations: WGUY; WZLO; WZON

History
- First air date: September 2002 (as WNZS)
- Former call signs: WNZS (2001–2016)
- Call sign meaning: Bangor

Technical information
- Licensing authority: FCC
- Facility ID: 128808
- Class: C
- Power: 1,000 watts day; 630 watts night
- Transmitter coordinates: 44°51′10.3″N 68°40′42.1″W
- Translators: 94.1 W231CH (Bangor); 95.1 W236DP (Bald Mountain)

Links
- Public license information: Public file; LMS
- Webcast: Listen live
- Website: mixmaine.com

WBAN (1340 AM) is a radio station broadcasting an adult contemporary format. Licensed to Veazie, Maine, United States, the station serves the Bangor area. The station is owned by Port Broadcasting, LLC, and is operated by Mix Maine Media as a simulcast of its WFMX in Waterville.

== History ==
WBAN originally signed on in 2002 as WNZS, initially simulcasting CNN Headline News but gradually adding talk shows, primarily from the Salem Radio Network. Programs included Bill Bennett's Morning in America, The Laura Ingraham Show, Mike Gallagher and Michael Medved. In 2011, co-owned WGUY signed on the air and began simulcasting WNZS. In March 2012, the station began simulcasting on FM translator W231CH 94.1, which had previously simulcast WWNZ. The FM translator switched to a simulcast of WGUY in May 2012, when that station flipped formats to oldies. In late 2014, the Salem Radio Network programming moved to WWNZ, with WNZS picking up WWNZ's Fox News Radio programming. As a talk station it also rebroadcast the newscasts from Bangor's ABC affiliate WVII.

In the summer of 2015, the station added an FM translator on 106.1, W291CO, however in early 2016 the translator was sold to Maine Public Broadcasting Network. The station changed its call sign to the current WBAN on July 27, 2016. In December 2016, Pine Tree Broadcasting announced that its stations would be sold to Port Broadcasting (owners of WWSF, WNBP and WXEX-FM/WXEX) with WBAN inheriting the soft adult contemporary format from WGUY and WGUY reverting to back to its oldies format it had carried previous to Pine Tree Broadcasting's ownership. W231CH, which had rebroadcast WGUY and its soft AC format, began rebroadcasting WBAN. NASCAR programming moved to WCYR.

In November 2024, Mix Maine Media began operating WBAN and WGUY under a five-year time brokerage agreement with Port Broadcasting, with an option to buy the stations for $225,000. Mix Maine Media replaced WBAN's "The Wave" adult contemporary format with a simulcast of its similarly-formatted WFMX in Waterville.

== Translators ==
Broadcast translators for WBAN
Call sign	Frequency	City of license	FID	ERP (W)	Class	FCC info
W231CH	94.1 FM	Bangor, Maine	85386	250	D	LMS
W236DP	95.1 FM	Bald Mountain, Maine	201411	215	D	LMS
