= TGC =

TGC may refer to:

== Companies and organisations ==
- Taiwan Garrison Command (1948–1992), former secret police unit of the Taiwanese armed forces
- Thatgamecompany, an American video game developer
- The Gospel Coalition, a U.S. religious organization
- The Grantsmanship Center, a U.S. non-profit organization which provides training in grant application
- Autoridad Única del Transporte de Gran Canaria, the transport authority on Gran Canaria in the Canary Islands
- Tren de Gran Canaria, a planned railway line in the Canary Islands

== Media and entertainment ==
- The Golden Compass (Northern Lights (Pullman novel)), a young-adult fantasy novel by Philip Pullman
- The Golf Channel, a US sports TV channel
- ReBoot: The Guardian Code (2018), a Canadian live-action/CGI-animated television series
- TGC (musical duo) A European musical duo, who write and self-produce atmospheric electro-pop music

== Science and medicine ==
- Thyroglossal cyst, a fibrous cyst that forms in the throat from a persistent thyroglossal duct
- Tight glucose control, a practice in the medical treatment of diabetes
- Time gain compensation, a setting applied in diagnostic ultrasound imaging
- TGC, a codon for the amino acid Cysteine

== Other ==
- Thai Green curry, a Thai dish
- The Grand Canyon, of the Colorado River in Arizona, USA
- The Great Courses, college-level audio and video courses by The Teaching Company
- Tokyo Girls Collection, a Japanese semi-annual fashion show
- Tradable green certificate, a European certificate representing production of some quantity of electricity by renewable processes
- Triple Gold Club, ice hockey players who have won the Stanley Cup, the Olympic gold medal in hockey, and the hockey World Championship
