= WZLO =

Radio station in Dover-Foxcroft, Maine, United States

Simulcast of WFMX, Waterville, Maine
- Dover-Foxcroft, Maine; United States
- Broadcast area: Bangor, Maine
- Frequency: 103.1 MHz
- Branding: The Mix

Programming
- Format: Adult contemporary
- Affiliations: ABC News Radio; Premiere Networks

Ownership
- Owner: Mix Maine Media; (J. Hanson Company, Inc.)
- Sister stations: WBAN; WGUY; WZON

History
- First air date: May 1981
- Former call signs: WDME-FM (1980–2009); WZON-FM (2009–2012)
- Call sign meaning: "Loft" (former branding)

Technical information
- Licensing authority: FCC
- Facility ID: 12882
- Class: A
- ERP: 1,500 watts
- HAAT: 204 meters (669 ft)
- Transmitter coordinates: 45°5′37.6″N 69°4′58.1″W
- Translator: 98.3 W252CT (Bangor)

Links
- Public license information: Public file; LMS
- Webcast: Listen live
- Website: mixmaine.com

WZLO (103.1 FM) is a commercial radio station that broadcasts an adult contemporary format. Licensed to Dover-Foxcroft, Maine, the station serves the Bangor area. The studios and offices are in Bangor, while the transmitter is off Route 15 in Charleston, Maine. The station is owned by Mix Maine Media, through licensee J. Hanson Company, and simulcasts WFMX from Skowhegan.

The station signed on in 1981 as WDME-FM, the FM sister station of WDME (1340 AM), which operated from 1967 to 1991. From 1983 to 1998, WDME's studios were located in a converted railroad car, the "Gulf Stream", that had been retired by Amtrak. The Zone Corporation, the broadcast company owned by authors Tabitha and Stephen King, bought WDME-FM in 2001; it renamed the station WZON-FM in 2009 and WZLO in 2012, and closed it in 2024. The station returned to the air after Mix Maine Media acquired it in 2025.

== History ==
Frank Alvin Delle Jr. and Eugene Joseph Gosselin, doing business as Radio Voice of Dover-Foxcroft, was granted a construction permit for a new station on 1340 AM in Dover-Foxcroft on February 8, 1967; it signed on August 13 as WDME. The call sign stood for the home city of Dover, Maine. WDME was part of a group of stations associated with Delle, along with WLKN in Lincoln and WFAD in Middlebury, Vermont.

Radio Voice of Dover-Foxcroft also requested the addition of an FM allocation on 103.1 MHz on January 13, 1967; a construction permit for a station on this frequency was issued to Delle on February 28, 1980. That September, Frederic Hirsch's Community Communications, Inc., announced it would purchase WDME and the WDME-FM permit for $116,000. On December 20, 1980, WDME began programming an easy listening format; in May 1981, WDME-FM signed on as a simulcast. Hirsch was previously an assistant at WNBC in New York City and news director at WVOX in New Rochelle, New York, and bought WDME after deciding to leave the New York metropolitan area.

In October 1983, WDME, having outgrown its previous studio facility, moved to a converted sleeper car formerly used by Amtrak. "Amtrak 3205", also named the "Gulf Stream", was built by the Budd Company for the New York Central Railroad in 1949, and had been retired and put up for sale by Amtrak due to the cost of converting the steam-heated car to electric heat. Hirsch, a railroad buff, bought the car at auction in Boston and had it relocated to Dover-Foxcroft, on a specially-laid 90-foot (27 m) track. In reflection of its unusual studio, train noises were included in WDME's station identifications. The station's music format was described by the Bangor Daily News as ranging "from light rock to light country". WDME also emphasized sports programming, carrying games of the Boston Red Sox, Boston Celtics, New England Patriots, Boston Bruins, high school sports, and University of Maine hockey, as well as a Sunday night sports talk program.

WDME's 1340 AM facility was closed down on February 16, 1991; its license was allowed to expire. WDME (AM) had simulcast 99 percent of WDME-FM's programming; in 1984, most separate programming had been airing at night. In addition, the AM signal had a smaller range than the FM, and closing the AM and its separate transmitter site allowed WDME to eliminate costs specific to that facility. WDME-FM continued as a stand-alone FM station, branded as "D-103". The station was known for its folksy portrayal of rural culture in the north woods of Maine. It featured locally-known personalities such as John Simcoe and Paul Knaut.

Community Communications sold WDME-FM to Ganley Communications for $150,000 in 1993. Hirsch would remain with the station to do news and sales work; his decision to sell was prompted by his desire to consult other radio stations, along with the increased financial pressures in station ownership. The new owners were Jim Ganley, who had worked at WWFX in Belfast before joining the May Company as a credit portfolio manager, and his brother Rick, an on-air host at WHEB in Portsmouth, New Hampshire. The Ganleys replaced Boston Red Sox broadcasts with the Portland Sea Dogs in 1995, in the wake of the 1994–95 Major League Baseball strike; the station did not want to air games featuring replacement players at the same price as games with the regular players. The move, which made WDME-FM the northernmost station on the Portland Sea Dogs Radio Network and led to an article in The Sporting News, was in part inspired by the Boston Red Sox Radio Network's decision to carry Pawtucket Red Sox games at the end of the 1994 season.

Ganley Communications agreed to sell WDME-FM to Richard Thau and Joyce L. Wemer's Mid-Maine Media for $275,000 in late 1995; the sale was completed on February 1, 1996. The new owners restored Red Sox broadcasts to the station at the request of listeners. In November 1998, Thau moved WDME-FM's studios from the "Gulf Stream" rail car, which could not be expanded, to a former bank building in downtown Dover-Foxcroft's Union Square. The rail car was sold, with its new owner relocating it to the Four Corners in Sebec, Maine. Thau noted the difficulty in running a radio station out of a train car; a WDME-FM employee later described the car as a "tin can".

After initially announcing a $175,000 sale to Taildragger Communications in May 2000, Mid-Maine Media sold WDME-FM to the Zone Corporation—the broadcasting company owned by authors Stephen and Tabitha King—for $175,100 in a deal completed on March 1, 2001. Zone already owned WZON and WKIT-FM in Bangor. WDME-FM's adult contemporary, sports, and news format had shifted to alternative by July 2002 and adult album alternative by 2003. While station management denied at the time of the sale that WDME-FM would use its existing sports programming as the basis to move to a full-time sports radio format similar to that of WZON, the station had become a simulcast of WZON by March 2009. The call sign WZON-FM was adopted on August 27.

WZON-FM switched to a progressive talk format on January 4, 2010. The station continued to carry Boston Red Sox baseball, along with WZON. Shortly after WZON (AM) began simulcasting WZON-FM on November 1, 2010, Red Sox games were moved exclusively to the AM station (which previously shared the broadcasts with WDME/WZON-FM). WZON-FM began stunting with Christmas music in November 2012, with the previous format moving exclusively to WZON (AM). The call letters were changed to WZLO on November 23, and the station returned to an adult album alternative format, initially branded as "103.1 The Loft", on December 26, 2012. In late 2014, WZLO began to simulcast on the second HD Radio channel of WKIT; the subchannel, in turn, was relayed on Bangor FM translator W252CT (98.3), which had previously carried WZON.

On December 2, 2024, Stephen King would announce that WZLO and its sister stations would shut down at the end of the month. While King subsequently reached a deal to sell WKIT to Jeff Solari and Greg Hawes' Rock Lobster Radio, no announcements were made regarding WZLO or WZON, and their December 31 closure went forward. In February 2025, the Zone Corporation agreed to sell WZLO, W252CT, and WZON to J Hanson's Mix Maine Media, operator of WBAN and WGUY in Veazie and owner of WFMX and WSKW in Skowhegan and WCTB in Fairfield. As part of the $125,000 deal, $75,000 would be donated to the Heart of Maine United Way; Hanson also paid for half the cost of removing the W252CT and WZON towers. Mix Maine Media completed its acquisition of the stations in April 2025; it would use WZLO to simulcast the "Mix" adult contemporary programming of WFMX and WBAN.
