= WBQA =

- Boothbay Harbor, Maine; United States
- Broadcast area: Mid Coast and Augusta, Maine
- Frequency: 96.7 MHz
- Branding: Maine Public Classical

Programming
- Format: Classical music

Ownership
- Owner: Maine Public Broadcasting Corporation

History
- First air date: April 1, 1984 (as WCME)
- Former call signs: WCME (1982–2009); WTQX (2009–2017)

Technical information
- Licensing authority: FCC
- Facility ID: 4090
- Class: B1
- ERP: 15,500 watts
- HAAT: 127 meters (417 feet)
- Transmitter coordinates: 44°1′31.3″N 69°34′15.2″W

Links
- Public license information: Public file; LMS
- Webcast: Listen live
- Website: mainepublic.org

WBQA (96.7 FM) is a non-commercial classical music radio station owned by Maine Public Broadcasting Corporation and licensed to Boothbay Harbor, Maine. The station serves Mid Coast Maine with studios in Portland, Lewiston and Bangor. WBQA operates as part of the Maine Public Classical network.

== History ==
The station signed on April 1, 1984, as WCME, an easy listening station owned by Bay Communications. WCME had news affiliations with the Associated Press and CNN. In 1990, the station changed to a country music format and affiliated with the Satellite Music Network. WCME began simulcasting with WPME (95.5 FM, now WPPI) in Topsham when it signed on in 1993; the following year, the stations changed to an oldies/classic rock format as "The Golden Eagle", with WPME becoming WXGL-FM.

After owner Robert Cole sold WXGL-FM to Great Eastern Media in 1996, WCME went silent for several weeks in March 1997 in what WXGL staff claimed was a permanent shutdown; however, WCME returned to the air that April with a mornings-only schedule of adult contemporary music from the 1970s and 1980s while Cole put the station up for sale. Tryon-Seacoast Broadcasting announced its acquisition of the station shortly afterward; that June, WCME returned to full-time operation with an adult contemporary format. Tryon-Seacoast took control of the station in July 1998 and changed it to a simulcast of country music station WKCG (101.3 FM) on July 27; earlier that year, it had agreed to sell its Central Maine stations to Cumulus Media. Cumulus moved the country music format to WCTB (93.5 FM) on March 1, 1999, with "Kicks Country" continuing to simulcast on WCME.

In August 2000, WCME and WCTB began simulcasting the "Score" sports programming of WSKW (1160 AM), as part of a five-station network that also included WIGY (97.5 FM, now WQSK) and WHQO (107.9 FM, now WFMX); shortly afterward, Cumulus agreed to sell its stations in the market to Clear Channel Communications. That October, WCME dropped "Score" programming for a simulcast of oldies station WABK-FM 104.3. By December 2001, WCME was carrying a news/talk format as part of Clear Channel's "Voice of Maine" network, along with WVOM in Bangor and WHQO in Skowhegan. WHQO was dropped from the network in November 2003 after Clear Channel ended its local marketing agreement with its owner, Mountain Wireless. In October 2005, WCME dropped WVOM's morning show in favor of that of WTOS-FM 105.1, filling a void in the mid-coast and Portland areas created when local jazz station WJZP-LP went on the air on the same frequency as WTOS. Other programs on WCME included The Wall Street Journal Morning Report, The War Room with Quinn and Rose, Glenn Beck, Rush Limbaugh, Dave Ramsey, Lars Larson, and Coast to Coast AM. WCME also carried University of Maine football and local sports, as well as Boston Red Sox baseball off and on throughout the early 2000s.

Clear Channel announced on November 16, 2006, that it would sell its Central Maine stations after being bought by private equity firms, resulting in a sale to Blueberry Broadcasting in 2008. On January 5, 2009, WCME dropped its talk programming and took on the "Star" adult contemporary format vacated by co-owned WKCG when it became WVQM, a simulcast of WVOM. The "Star" image and AC format was short lived, as in March of the same year, the station began simulcasting WTOS-FM. On May 4, 2009, WCME changed its call letters to WTQX.

Maine Public purchased WTQX for $550,000 in 2017 with the intention of making it the sixth station in its Maine Public Classical network. The sale was completed on October 31, 2017; concurrently, the call letters changed to WBQA.
