= WAMB (disambiguation) =

WAMB may refer to:

- WFNB (AM), a radio station (1130 AM) licensed to serve Brazil, Indiana, United States, which held the call sign WAMB from 2017 to 2024
- WFCN, a radio station (1200 AM) licensed to serve Nashville, Tennessee, United States, which held the call sign WAMB from 2006 to 2016
- WCRT (AM), a radio station (1160 AM) licensed to serve Donelson, Tennessee, which held the call sign WAMB from 1978 to 2006
