= WBQE =

- Milbridge, Maine; United States
- Broadcast area: Down East; Hancock County; Washington County
- Frequency: 93.7 MHz
- Branding: Maine Public Classical

Programming
- Format: Classical music

Ownership
- Owner: Maine Public Broadcasting Corporation
- Sister stations: WMED; WMEH

History
- First air date: August 2005
- Former call signs: WRMO (2003–2017); WBQE (July 24–31, 2017); WRMO (8/2017-11/2017)

Technical information
- Licensing authority: FCC
- Facility ID: 84096
- Class: B
- ERP: 27,000 watts
- HAAT: 204 meters (669 feet)
- Transmitter coordinates: 44°38′33.3″N 68°10′16.1″W

Links
- Public license information: Public file; LMS
- Webcast: Listen live
- Website: www.mainepublic.org

WBQE (93.7 MHz) is a non-commercial radio station licensed to Milbridge, Maine owned by the Maine Public Broadcasting Corporation that serves the Downeast coastal region of Maine including the city of Ellsworth and the towns of Bar Harbor and Machias. Known as "Maine Public Classical", the station features a classical music format.

== History ==
The station originally was signed on in August 2005 as WRMO, a 130-watt class A classic rock station by owner and broadcast engineer Lyle Robert Evans of Green Bay, Wisconsin, and station manager Mike McSorley. Less than a year later, in June 2006, the station's ownership was transferred to the estate of Evans, following his death on March 6, 2006.

In September 2006, the estate entered into a purchase agreement for WRMO with Mike McSorley. From September 2006 to October 20, 2010, the station programmed an adult standards/oldies adult contemporary format known as “Songs You Know and Music You Love” from studios in Steuben, Maine. Citing financial difficulties, the station fell silent on October 20, 2010.

On June 26, 2011, the estate of Mr. Evans sold WRMO to Pine Tree Broadcasting, LLC. The station temporally returned to the air broadcasting with 130 watts from Milbridge on September 20, 2011, through November 8, 2011. On March 24, 2012, at 1:46 AM EDT, WRMO returned to the air once again as an upgraded class B station broadcasting with 22,500 watts from its new tower site in Franklin, Maine.

On November 16, 2016, Maine Public Broadcasting Corporation announced that it would acquire WRMO from Pine Tree Broadcasting for $150,000; the station flipped to Maine Public's classical music network on December 1, 2016. WGUY (1230 AM) in Veazie and W231CH (94.1 FM) in Bangor retained The Wave's soft adult contemporary format. Maine Public Broadcasting's purchase of WRMO was consummated on February 8, 2017. The station's call letters were changed to WBQE on July 24, 2017; the WRMO call letters were restored one week later. In November 2017, they returned to WBQE.
