= WCRT =

WCRT may refer to:

- WCRT (AM), a radio station (1160 AM) licensed to Donelson, Tennessee, United States
- WCRT-FM, a radio station (88.5 FM) licensed to Terre Haute, Indiana, United States
- WYDE (AM), a radio station (1260 AM) licensed to Birmingham, Alabama, United States, which used the call sign WCRT from the 1950s to February 1991
- WMJJ, a radio station (96.5 FM) licensed to Birmingham, Alabama, United States, which used the call sign WCRT-FM in the 1960s and 1970s
