= WDME =

WDME may mean:

- WDME-CD, a low-power television station (channel 20/PSIP 47) licensed to serve Washington, D.C., United States
- WZLO, a radio station (103.1 FM) licensed to serve Dover-Foxcroft, Maine, United States, which held the call sign WDME-FM from 1980 to 2009
- WDME (AM), a defunct radio station (1340 AM) licensed to serve Dover-Foxcroft, Maine, which operated from 1967 to 1991
