= Tabitha King =

American author (born 1949)

- Born: Tabitha Jane Spruce; March 24, 1949 (age 77); Old Town, Maine, U.S.
- Education: University of Maine
- Occupation: Author
- Spouse: Stephen King (m. 1971)
- Children: 3, including Joe and Owen
- Writing career
- Genres: Horror; fantasy; science fiction

Tabitha Jane King (née Spruce, born March 24, 1949) is an American author.

== Early life ==
Born in Old Town, Maine, Tabitha King is the third eldest daughter of Sarah Jane née White and Raymond George Spruce. She attended John Bapst Memorial High School in Bangor, Maine before enrolling at the University of Maine in Orono where she met her husband Stephen King through her work-study job in the Raymond H. Fogler Library.

== Career ==
As of 2026, King had published eight novels and two works of non-fiction. She published her first novel, Small World, through Signet Books in 1981 and in 2006, Candles Burning was published by Berkley Books. The paperback rights for Small World were bought by New American Library for $165,000. Candles Burning was written predominantly by Michael McDowell, who died in 1999, and the McDowell family requested that King finish the work.

In 2023, she was the executive producer of the independent horror film The Sudbury Devil.

=== Reception ===
Reception to King's work has ranged from negative to positive. Pearl received positive mentions from the Los Angeles Times and the Bangor Daily News, while the Chicago Tribune panned Survivor. The Arizona Daily Star criticized One on One, calling King "a hack", whereas Entertainment Weekly, Time, and the Rocky Mountain News gave the novel positive reviews. Caretakers was lauded by The New York Times for its characterization of its protagonists. In 2006, King completed and published Michael McDowell's final novel, Candles Burning, to mixed reviews. Bookreporter.com wrote that some readers might be disappointed by the changes King made to McDowell's original.

== Awards and recognition ==
- Honorary Doctorates of Humane Letters, University of Maine (May 1987)
- Dowd Achievement Award (1992)
- Constance H. Carlson Public Humanities Prize (1998)

== Social activism ==
King has served on several boards and committees in the state of Maine including the Bangor Public Library board. She also served on the board of the Maine Public Broadcasting System until 1994. In 1998 she received the inaugural Constance H. Carlson Public Humanities Prize, the Maine Humanities Council's highest award, for her work with literacy for the state of Maine. In 2019, Tabitha and Stephen King donated $1.25 million to the New England Historic Genealogical Society.

She serves as vice president of WZON/WZLO/WKIT radio stations, as well as in the administration of two family philanthropic foundations. The Stephen and Tabitha King Foundation, chaired by her and her husband, ranks sixth among Maine charities in terms of average annual giving, with over $2.8 million in grants per year, according to The Grantsmanship Center.

== Personal life ==
Tabitha and Stephen King married on January 2, 1971. They have a daughter, Naomi, and two sons, Joe Hill (Joseph Hillström King) and Owen King, who are both writers.

=== Partnership with Stephen King ===
Prior to her husband's commercial success, Tabitha worked extra shifts at Dunkin' Donuts so that Stephen could write full-time. As Stephen recalled the origin of his debut novel, Carrie: "Two unrelated ideas, adolescent cruelty and telekinesis, came together." It began as a short story intended for Cavalier; Stephen tossed the first three pages in the trash but Tabitha recovered them, saying she wanted to know what happened next. He followed her advice and expanded it into a novel. She told him: "You've got something here. I really think you do."

That began a practice that continues today: Tabitha and Stephen review each other's drafts and also those of their two sons.

== Bibliography ==
=== Novels ===
Year	Title	Publisher	ISBN	Pages	Note
1981	Small World	Signet Books	9780451114082	312	
1983	Caretakers	Scribner's	9780025631502	274	First novel set in King's fictional community of Nodd's Ridge
1986	The Trap	Scribner's	9780451160300	352	Also published as Wolves at the Door; second novel set in Nodd's Ridge
1988	Pearl	Signet Books	9780451162625	368	Third novel set in Nodd's Ridge
1993	One on One	Signet Books	9780451179814	528	Fourth novel set in Nodd's Ridge
1994	The Book of Reuben	Signet Books	9780451179999	432	Fifth and last novel set in King's fictional community of Nodd's Ridge
1997	Survivor	Signet Books	9780451190901	496	
2006	Candles Burning	Berkley Publishing Group	9780425210284	423	With Michael McDowell, King continued her writing after McDowell's death in 1999

=== Nonfiction ===
Year	Title	Publisher	ISBN	Pages	Note
1994	Playing Like a Girl; Cindy Blodgett and the Lawrence Bulldogs Season of 93-94	Dendrite Corporation	N/A	42	The work is about basketball player Cindy Blodgett during her time at Lawrence High School.
1994	Mid-life Confidential: The Rock Bottom Remainders Tour America with Three Chords and an Attitude	Berkley Publishing Group	9780452274594	222	Written by all of the Rock Bottom Remainders with photos by Tabitha King

=== Short stories ===
- The Blue Chair (1981)
- The Demonstration (1985)
- Road Kill (1986)
- Djinn and Tonic (1998)
- The Women's Room (2002)
- Archie Smith, Boy Wonder (2011)

=== Poetry ===
- A Gradual Canticle for Augustine (1967)
- Elegy for Ike (1967)
- Note 1 from Herodotus (1968)
- Nonsong (1970)
- The Last Vampire: A Baroque Fugue (1971)

=== Teleplay ===
- "The Passion of Reverend Jimmy" (Note: episode of Kingdom Hospital, co-written with Stephen King) (2004)

=== Contributions and compilations ===
- Murderess Ink: The Better Half of the Mystery, Dilys Winn, ed., Bell, 1979
- Shadows, Volume 4, C. L. Grant, ed., Doubleday, 1981
- Midlife Confidential, ed. David Marsh et al., photographs by Tabitha King, Viking Penguin, 1994
