= Robert Skoglund =

American humorist (1936–2024)

- Born: Robert Karl Skoglund; January 18, 1936; St. George, Maine, U.S.
- Died: November 30, 2024 (aged 88); St. George, Maine, U.S.
- Other name: The humble Farmer
- Occupations: Humorist, columnist, radio personality

Robert Skoglund (January 18, 1936 – November 30, 2024), known professionally as The humble Farmer, was an American humorist, columnist, and radio personality.

== Early life ==
Skoglund was born on January 8, 1936 in St. George, Maine, to a Swedish immigrant father. His maternal ancestors settled in the same area in 1734. He was the only student in his Rockland, Maine, high school class to receive a college degree. Skoglund learned to play several instruments and mastered a half dozen languages. In 1970, he earned a master's degree in linguistics from the University of Rochester.

== Career ==
In the 1970s, Skoglund published humorous one-line personals in the Maine Times, such as: "Antique dealer seeks attractive young woman interested in one night stand" and "experienced traveler seeks attractive young woman who really enjoys being abroad." This caught the attention of local radio stations and media publications.

In 1982, Skoglund sent out samples of his writing and invited newspaper editors from around the nation to partake in a free lobster bake in his backyard. According to Skoglund, the bake was a promotional gimmick to gain exposure for his humor column. The event became an annual occurrence each August, growing from a few guests the first year, to hundreds of musicians, entertainers, politicians and celebrities. At its height, the bake was held "under an enormous tent with a full-sized stage for the entertainers and a crew of 50 volunteers as cooks, servers and parking attendants", said Skoglund in a 2015 interview. Skoglund soon gained national recognition and by 1988 he was giving "three talks a week" as The humble Farmer. More than 50 newspapers were running Skoglund's column nationwide. Skoglund always pointed out that the "H" in "humble" was lowercase because it was "more humble that way."

Skoglund also hosted a weekly jazz and humor program called The Humble Farmer on Maine Public Radio from 1978 until 2007. The program offered "humor, self-deprecating, dry New England wit, jazz music from the 1920s through the 1940s, history, letters from far flung fans, odd snippets of news, obtuse observations, politics, philosophy, and wonderings." Writer Mike Crowe likened the show to A Prairie Home Companion saying: "What Garrison Keillor is to the Midwest and the nation, Robert Skoglund is to Maine and New England." The Boston Herald also called Skoglund: "New England's Answer to Garrison Keillor." Maine humorist Tim Sample said of Skoglund: "[he] always struck me as a person who could put the authentic, true Maine humor point of view across in the written word. He's aware that he's coming from an oral tradition of humor that has tremendous value and history of legacy from our ancestors." For nearly three decades, Skoglund worked pro bono for MPBN Radio before asking $30 a show in 2006.

In 2007, Skoglund's radio program was canceled stemming from a series of disputes over whether or not some of Skoglund's comments were in violation of the station's policy of neutrality on political issues. In what is now referred to as the "War Rant", in 2003, Skoglund spoke on-air about a "weasely-faced war monger from way down south who didn't even get most of the popular vote." He went on to describe the person as the author of Mein Kampf. Three years later, he read passages from Encyclopædia Britannica about Fascism under Mussolini. Executives at MPBN radio regarded these comments to be subtle comparisons to then-President George W. Bush and reprimanded Skoglund. Asking him to refrain from all political commentary, on November 3, 2006, Skoglund submitted a pre-recorded program where he read a letter from a listener in Maryland who described state tax cuts. The radio management saw this as supporting a position on Maine's upcoming Taxpayer Bill of Rights referendum question and chose not to air the program. Skoglund received a certified letter at his home from MPBN vice president for Programming, Charles Beck, warning him that further comments perceived as political would result in the show's cancellation. Skoglund saw this as a set-up for him to fail since the new policy agreement would confine the show's format to only play music with no commentary. MPBN vice-president David Morse stated in a press release: "Skoglund refused to sign the ethical standards agreement that all on-air talent sign." Skoglund's program was canceled June 13, 2007. In an article addressed to the Sun Journal titled: "Clean house at MPBN", Arthur Harvey took issue with the letter sent to Skoglund's home which read: "You will not introduce your own or others' political thoughts, ideas, expressions, writings or thinking which clearly or can be perceived as endorsing, dismissing or taking a stand on controversial issues." He further went on to state that "MPBN would not dare to require the Capitol Steps or Prairie Home Companion to sign such an agreement, although both entertainers make politically controversial remarks." After his departure from the radio station, 60 state legislators signed a petition to reinstate Skoglund.

Starting in 2013, Skoglund began broadcasting his show as a weekly podcast under the title: "Maine Private Radio and No Things Considered". He also wrote a regular humor column for the Portland Press Herald. and produced a television show called "humble Farmer" which broadcast on BCTV2 in Belfast, Rockland and online.

== Personal life and death ==
After serving in the Coast Guard stationed in Rockland in the 1960s, Skoglund met his first wife, Anne Galey, in Tenants Harbor. The two taught school together. Their marriage ended when Galey took a job with Down East Magazine and never came back. "When she did not return after three months," says Skoglund, "I figured the marriage was over." Skoglund married his second wife Marsha van Zandbergen, who he referred to as the "almost perfect woman" on his radio program and in syndicated news columns, at the age of 55 on Saturday, June 22, 1991. Together they ran a seasonal bed and breakfast in St. George, Maine. An avid farmer, Skoglund sold home grown vegetables from his front yard, called the "Center of the Universe", which dons a 16-foot monolith topped with a trumpeting monkey.

An advocate for solar power, Skoglund introduced the first electric car charging station in St. George, Maine, in 2019. He died on November 30, 2024, at the age of 88.

== Published works ==
- Skoglund, Robert Karl (July 27, 2017). Chicken Poop for the Soil: Wit and Wisdom from The Humble Farmer. CreateSpace Independent Publishing Platform. ISBN 978-1973890652.
- Skoglund, Robert Karl (December 19, 2022). Chicken Poop for the Reader's Soil: Writings from 2014 to 2022. ISBN 979-8370385155.
