= WQCB =

- Brewer, Maine; United States
- Broadcast area: Bangor and Down East, Maine
- Frequency: 106.5 MHz
- Branding: Q-106.5

Programming
- Format: Country
- Affiliations: Compass Media Networks; Westwood One

Ownership
- Owner: Townsquare Media; (Townsquare License, LLC)
- Sister stations: WBZN, WDEA, WEZQ, WWMJ

History
- First air date: January 28, 1986
- Call sign meaning: W Quality Country for Bangor

Technical information
- Licensing authority: FCC
- Facility ID: 9284
- Class: C
- ERP: 100,000 watts
- HAAT: 329 meters (1,079 ft)
- Transmitter coordinates: 45.057°N 69.190°W

Links
- Public license information: Public file; LMS
- Webcast: Listen Live
- Website: q1065.fm

WQCB (106.5 FM, "Q-106.5") is a commercial radio station licensed to Brewer, Maine, and serving Bangor and Down East Maine. It airs a country radio format and is owned by Townsquare Media. The studios and offices are on Acme Road in Brewer.

WQCB is a Class C FM station, allowing it higher power and a wider coverage area than most stations in the Northeastern U.S., which are largely Class B. WQCB has an effective radiated power (ERP) of 100,000 watts. The signal stretches from Greenville and Millinocket to the north, down to the Atlantic Ocean. The transmitter is off Foss Hill Road in Garland.

This station features local disc jockeys during the daytime hours. After 7 p.m., WQCB carries syndicated country music shows, Taste of Country Nights and CMT After Midnite with Cody Allen. On weekends, it airs American Country Countdown with Kix Brooks, Country Countdown USA with Lon Helton, Country Gold with Rowdy Yates and The Road with Steve Stewart. WQCB's main country competitor is WBFB in Bangor, owned by Blueberry Broadcasting.

== History ==
WQCB signed on the air on January 28, 1986. It was owned by Castle Broadcasting with Katherine Dolley as general manager, in an era where it was rare for women to be radio executives. The station has been playing country music throughout its three plus decades on the air.

WQCB disc jockeys, along with local CBS affiliate WABI-TV personalities, regularly participate in the Eastern Maine Pine Tree Camp Ride, a 20-mile snowmobile race to benefit the Pine Tree Society, which helps people in Maine with disabilities.

In 1998, Cumulus Media, one of America's largest radio station owners, bought WQCB and sister station WBZN for $6.4 million. In August 2013, Cumulus decided to leave Maine and sold the radio stations to Townsquare Media.

Logo under former slogan
