= WFMX =

Radio station in Skowhegan, Maine

- Skowhegan, Maine; United States
- Broadcast area: Augusta-Waterville, Maine
- Frequency: 107.9 MHz
- Branding: 107-9 The Mix

Programming
- Language: English
- Format: Adult contemporary
- Affiliations: Premiere Networks; WGME-TV

Ownership
- Owner: Mix Maine Media; (J. Hanson Company, Inc.)
- Sister stations: WCTB; WSKW

History
- First air date: March 17, 1990
- Former call signs: WHQO (1987–2007)
- Call sign meaning: "Mix"

Technical information
- Licensing authority: FCC
- Facility ID: 26388
- Class: C2
- ERP: 32,000 watts
- HAAT: 129 meters (423 ft)
- Transmitter coordinates: 44.617°N 69.625°W
- Repeaters: 103.1 WZLO (Dover-Foxcroft); 1340 WBAN (Veazie)

Links
- Public license information: Public file; LMS
- Webcast: Listen live
- Website: mixmaine.com

WFMX (107.9 FM, "107-9 the Mix") is an adult contemporary–formatted radio station licensed to Skowhegan, Maine. The station is owned by J. Hanson Company, doing business as Mix Maine Media. Its programming is also simulcast on WZLO in Dover-Foxcroft and WBAN in Veazie (near Bangor).

== History ==
WFMX went on the air March 17, 1990, as a satellite fed oldies format under the call letters WHQO (for "Headquarters for Oldies") changing a few years later to a community-based adult contemporary format as "The Light at the end of the dial". In the late 1990s, as ownership of the station changed frequently the station changed formats several times, including simulcasting the sports of WSKW (1996–1999), top 40 as "The Party 108" (1999–2000), and talk (both simulcasting WVOM-FM from Bangor and solo) before flipping to the current "Mix 107.9" in February 2005. In 1999 an effort was made to donate the station to Maine Public Radio; the donation was never completed, as it was contingent on a never-completed sale of Mountain Wireless' stations to Cumulus Media.

In February 2007, the call letters were changed to WFMX, to more closely resemble the "Mix" name. Those calls were previously used by what is now WVBZ when it was licensed to Statesville, North Carolina. A power increase was granted as well, improving the signal to the south. WFMX had been working with the developers of the Hathaway Creative Center in Waterville with intentions anchor the refurbished mill in late 2008. Agreeable terms could not be met, so WFMX and its cluster-mates took occupancy of new space on Kennedy Memorial Drive in Waterville.

On April 23, 2013, WFMX was granted for a construction permit to increase its ERP up to 32,000 watts and to raise its HAAT up to 129 meters (423 feet). The station was licensed with the new facilities on April 18, 2016. For part of WFMX's adult contemporary format, they aired Delilah's syndicated love songs program. Then in 2017, WFMX became a classic hits / hot AC format. With the repositioning of today's music and classic hits, the station shelved Delilah's program for local talent and more music nights.

In November 2024, WBAN in Veazie (near Bangor), which had previously offered a similar adult contemporary format as "The Wave", began simulcasting WFMX under a time brokerage agreement. In 2025, WZLO in Dover-Foxcroft joined the "Mix" simulcast after Mix Maine Media bought that station from Stephen King.

WFMX main studios are located at The Lee Farm Mall on Western Avenue in Augusta, with additional facilities at Penny Hill Park in Waterville.
