= One on One (novel) =

1993 novel by Tabitha King

- Author: Tabitha King
- Language: English
- Genre: Novel
- Publisher: Dutton Adult
- Publication date: March 1, 1993
- Publication place: United States
- Media type: Print (Hardcover)
- ISBN: 0525935908

One on One is a 1993 fiction novel by author Tabitha King, set in the fictitious New England town of Nodd's Ridge. The book was published by Dutton Adult.

== Plot synopsis ==
One on One follows Sam and Deanie, two high school students that are more different than they are alike. The two fall in love, only to be faced with multiple adversities, from rivals to sports.

== Reception ==
Reception for One on One was mostly positive, with Entertainment Weekly giving the novel a rating of B+. The Chicago Tribune wrote that the book "stands up on its own merits".

The novel was panned by the Arizona Daily Star, saying that King was "a hack", although admitting that "(a)nyone who can go through the grueling process of writing a novel and getting it published deserves a lot of credit." Publishers Weekly gave an ambivalent review, praising the characters while criticizing the plot as "flabby".
