= WWMJ =

Radio station in Ellsworth, Maine

- Ellsworth, Maine; United States
- Broadcast area: Bangor, Maine
- Frequency: 95.7 MHz
- Branding: I-95

Programming
- Format: Classic rock
- Affiliations: New England Patriots Radio Network

Ownership
- Owner: Townsquare Media; (Townsquare License, LLC)
- Sister stations: WQCB, WEZQ, WDEA, WBZN

History
- First air date: December 27, 1965 (as WDEA-FM)
- Former call signs: WDEA-FM (1965–1983)
- Call sign meaning: Similar to "Magic" (previous branding)

Technical information
- Licensing authority: FCC
- Facility ID: 17670
- Class: B
- ERP: 11,500 watts
- HAAT: 314 meters (1,030 ft)
- Transmitter coordinates: 44°39′31.2″N 68°36′18.1″W

Links
- Public license information: Public file; LMS
- Webcast: Listen live
- Website: www.i95rocks.com

WWMJ (95.7 FM) is a radio station broadcasting a classic rock format. Licensed to Ellsworth, Maine, United States, the station serves the Bangor, Maine area. The station is currently owned by Townsquare Media. The station's competitors are WKIT in Brewer and WNSX in Winter Harbor.

== History ==
The station went on the air as WDEA-FM on December 27, 1965. On August 25, 1983, the station changed its call sign to the current WWMJ. The station flipped from WDEA's full service format to adult contemporary and remained in that format until flipping to oldies and changing its moniker to Magic 95.7. The oldies format would remain until Christmas 2005. The station also picked up New England Patriots football, after WFZX's contract ended. WWMJ was also an affiliate of Imus in the Morning until his show was cancelled after Don Imus' comments about the Rutgers women's basketball team.
