= Mike Elliott (radio personality) =

Mike Elliott (John Michael Elliot) is a voice over artist and United States radio personality.

Mike Elliott's radio career has taken him from Maine to Pittsburgh, Tampa and Orlando, to Los Angeles, to Phoenix (KZZP) and Tucson, Arizona, where he had the highest-rated morning show in the contemporary-hit format according to Arbitron holding a 25 share in the Tucson market. That means that one out of every four radios that were turned on in Tucson in the morning was tuned to his show. Elliott co-hosted a morning show on 93.7 KRQ with Jimmy Kimmel from 1992-1994.

In 1996 Elliott built WBZN - Z-107.3 / Bangor, Maine from a construction permit into a CHR market leader, owning it for two years.

Mike Elliott & co-worker "Bill" LaTour wrote the parody song "Rock Me Jerry Lewis" in 1986 which reached Number 1 on The Dr. Demento's Funny Five chart.
