= Suzanne Nance =

American singer and actress

Suzanne Nance is an American singer (soprano), actress, and radio and television personality.

Nance earned a bachelor of music degree from Syracuse University in New York before earning a masters degree from DePaul University in Chicago. She was a faculty member of the Cappelli Institute of Music in Chicago (professor of voice), and simultaneously, a host and a producer at Aspen Public Radio in Aspen, Colorado. In September 2007, she became the music director of the Maine Public Broadcasting Network. She also hosted its Morning Classical Music radio program. A soprano, she also continues to actively perform. She left MPBN in mid-2013.

Since 2018, Nance has been president and CEO of All Classical Portland (KQAC) (89.9 FM and allclassical.org), in Portland, Oregon. She was formerly the station's afternoon host from 2:00PM to 6:00PM weekdays, and served for a time as Interim CEO. She was hired by KQAC in 2015.

She continues to participate in the KQAC Sunday Brunch program and serves as Executive Producer for all of the station's nationally-syndicated programs.
