= Norton Kiritz =

American educator (1936–2006)

Norton J. Kiritz (1936 - 2006) was an American educator and founder of the Grantsmanship Center.

== Early life ==
Born in New York City to a shoe salesman, Kiritz spent his early life in the Bronx and was educated at Bronx High School of Science. After enrolling as a scholarship student in the engineering department at Cornell University, Kiritz lost interest in pursuing an engineering degree there and after relocating to California, he graduated from the University of California, Los Angeles in 1959 with a degree in psychology.

== Career ==
Kiritz founded the Grantsmanship Center in 1972 as a resource for nonprofit organizations to learn more of the details and best practices in developing their programs and obtaining funding from public and private sources.

In 2000, the California Community Foundation described Kiritz's manual Program Planning and Proposal Writing as ‘’the proposal writer's bible’’. This manual was later updated and expanded in newer editions in order to reflect more-current trends and best practices in the field.

In February 2006, after a long series of struggles with cancer, Kiritz died at age 70. Later that year, Norton Kiritz’s four-decade career in philanthropy education was celebrated in a Los Angeles multimedia life memorial event curated by his widow and successor as the Grantsmanship Center’s chief executive officer, Cathleen Kiritz Elliott. Kiritz Elliott also re-edited and guided the ongoing process of producing updated editions of Kiritz’s magnum opus Program Planning and Proposal Writing in the 2010s and 2020s.

== Bibliography ==
- Floersch, Barbara; Kiritz, Norton (1972). Grantsmanship: Program Planning & Proposal Writing
- Kiritz, Norton; Mundel, Jerry. Program Planning & Proposal Writing: Introductory Version
