= Small World (King novel) =

1981 book

- Author: Tabitha King
- Language: English
- Genre: Horror novel
- Publisher: Signet Books
- Publication date: 1981
- Publication place: United States
- Media type: Print (Paperback & Hardback)

Small World is a horror novel by Tabitha King, her first novel.

== Full plot summary ==
Dorothy "Dolly" Hardesty Douglas is a wealthy, spoiled middle-age widow—and the daughter of a former United States President. When Dolly was a child, a member of the White House's housekeeping staff presented her with a replica of the White House, but Dolly, then twelve, considered herself too old for such a toy. Only later in life—after the death of her parents, the loss of her husband, and a string of bitter disappointments—did Dolly turn to the Doll's White House. Quickly she became obsessed with recreating the actual White House in miniature, until the Doll's White House became one of the most famous dollhouses in the world.

Enter Roger Tinker, a thirty-something unemployed government scientist who invented the minimizer: a portable, camera-sized gizmo that can shrink objects. Intellectually gifted but socially inept, Tinker believes he can use the minimizer to win the heart—and the pocketbook—of miniature enthusiast Dolly. Instead she manipulates Tinker, both psychologically and sexually, into a shocking crime spree.

Dolly is an angry, ruthless woman used to bullying people into letting her have her way. At first her dominating nature thrills Tinker, who is made first part of her entourage before gradually becoming her only companion. To please her, he is willing to raid museums for items to minimize for the Doll's White House. These items include a full-size park carousel (which Tinker reduces to fit into a duffle bag) and an expensive Italian sports car. At first Tinker is unwilling to teach Dolly the mechanics of the minimizer or show her how to work the device, for fear that she will no longer need him. Later he refuses to allow her near the minimizer when he realises that Dolly has no morals when it comes to getting what she wants. Tinker witnesses Dolly's tight-fisted interactions with her former daughter-in-law Lucy, who is of Dolly's interest only because of her skill in creating miniatures and her custody of Dolly's two grandchildren. When Lucy becomes romantically involved with museum curator Nick, once Dolly's lover, Dolly is furious. Tinker also sees Dolly's overreaction when a beautiful television news anchor, Leyna Shaw, publicly beards her.

As Dolly's interest in the world outside the minimizer and the Doll's White House "shrinks", Tinker is desperate to do something that will make himself valuable to her once more. When a chance encounter leaves Tinker alone with the hated Leyna Shaw, Tinker uses the minimizer to shrink the woman to doll-size and installs her into the Doll's White House.

Leyna recovers slowly from the physical and psychological shock of minimizing. At first she believes that she is the victim of a head-injury and has gone insane, but slowly she grasps the reality of her situation and realises she is a prisoner in the Doll's White House, at the mercy of her old enemy Dolly. While Tinker awakens to a sense of sympathy and responsibility toward "teeny-tiny Leyna", Dolly delights in terrifying her new "doll". She molests Leyna and mocks her misfortune, until one night Leyna, now fully aware of her circumstances, takes advantage of Dolly's absence to go on a destructive rampage. She uses the tiny, functional electrical wiring of the dollhouse to set the structure on fire. Then, before the flames can reach her, she takes her own life.

Her anger, coupled with the sense of power given by the minimizer, sets Dolly on a final downward spiral of greed and entitlement. She now wishes to use the minimizer to abduct her grandchildren. Tinker, who was genuinely upset and distressed at Leyna's suicide, catches onto Dolly's plans too late. She uses the minimizer to get Tinker safely out of her way, then minimizes her own grandchildren and locks them up in another, lesser dollhouse. Lucy and Nick, who disbelieved Tinker's earlier warnings about the minimizer, manage to locate Dolly. In their confrontation, Dolly is killed by falling from the window of the room where her dollhouses are displayed.

In the final scenes of the novel, Roger Tinker—who has survived minimizing—begins work to reverse the shrinking process in order to save himself and the two children. Lucy and Nick make arrangements with Nick's father before electing to be minimized themselves, entering the world of the dollhouse in order to care for Lucy's children. Their future is uncertain, and the book ends on an equally ambiguous note: as Nick assures his father that "they'll survive", the book closes with a simple sentence, "And they did."

== Reception ==
William Martin Vaughn of The Manhattan Mercury stated: "The quality of Mrs. King's book is not up to par with the best of her husband's, but easily matches some of his earlier efforts." Jody Goodwin of the Sun Journal opined that King would be providing her husband with "some rather stiff competition", praising the "terrifyingly real" writing and the "superb and surprising" ending. Katherine Guckenberger of the Gannett News Service called it a "structurally flawed first novel, written with some flair and a total lack of taste."
