= WDEA =

- Ellsworth, Maine; United States
- Broadcast area: Hancock County, Maine
- Frequency: 1370 kHz
- Branding: AM 1370 WDEA

Programming
- Format: Adult standards
- Affiliations: America's Best Music; CBS Radio Network; Boston Red Sox Radio Network

Ownership
- Owner: Townsquare Media; (Townsquare License, LLC)
- Sister stations: WBZN, WEZQ, WQCB, WWMJ

History
- First air date: December 13, 1958
- Call sign meaning: "Wonderful Downeast Area"

Technical information
- Licensing authority: FCC
- Facility ID: 17671
- Class: B
- Power: 5,000 watts
- Transmitter coordinates: 44°28′0″N 68°28′11″W

Links
- Public license information: Public file; LMS
- Webcast: WDEA Webstream
- Website: wdea.am

WDEA (1370 AM) is a radio station broadcasting an adult standards format. Licensed to Ellsworth, Maine, United States, the station serves the Downeast Maine area. The station is owned by Townsquare Media and features programming from Westwood One's adult standards format called America's Best Music, with a local morning show formerly hosted by Rick Foster. Previously, WDEA aired adult standards/MOR music from Citadel Media's Timeless. WDEA carries news on-the-hour and news features from the CBS Radio Network and has been an affiliate of that network for many decades.

WDEA also broadcasts live basketball coverage of all Mount Desert Island High School and Ellsworth High School games in addition to being a long-time affiliate of the Boston Red Sox Radio Network.
