= WBZN =

- Old Town, Maine; United States
- Broadcast area: Bangor, Maine
- Frequency: 107.3 MHz
- Branding: Z107.3

Programming
- Language: English
- Format: Contemporary Hit Radio
- Affiliations: Compass Media Networks; Premiere Networks

Ownership
- Owner: Townsquare Media; (Townsquare License, LLC)
- Sister stations: WDEA, WEZQ, WQCB, WWMJ

History
- First air date: January 1, 1995; 31 years ago
- Former call signs: WUMC (1990–1993, CP)

Technical information
- Licensing authority: FCC
- Facility ID: 18535
- Class: C2
- ERP: 50,000 watts
- HAAT: 126 meters (413 ft)
- Transmitter coordinates: 45°0′45.4″N 68°44′54.2″W

Links
- Public license information: Public file; LMS
- Webcast: Listen live
- Website: z1073.com

WBZN (107.3 FM) is a commercial radio station licensed to Old Town, Maine, and serving the Bangor, Maine area. It is owned by Townsquare Media and airs a contemporary hit radio format. The station's studios and offices are on Acme Road in Brewer.

WBZN has an effective radiated power (ERP) of 50,000 watts. Its transmitter is off Miller Way in Alton.

== History ==
The station first signed on the air on January 1, 1995. Previously, various owners attempted to put it on the air beginning in 1990. A construction permit for 107.3 was issued by the Federal Communications Commission in 1990 with the working call sign WUMC, but that version never made it to the airwaves.

Eclipse Broadcasting bought the construction permit in 1993 for $55,000. When the station finally launched, the station's callsign was WBZN and it aired a "Greatest Hits of the 70s" classic hits format. Eclipse Broadcasting was started by Chuck Foster and Mike Elliott. During that period, WBZN began calling itself Z107.3.

The station was heavily involved with Eastern Maine Medical Center's Children's Miracle Network charities spearheaded by Sales Manager Greg Carpenter.

In 1998, Cumulus Media, one of America's largest radio station owners, acquired WBZN and sister station WQCB for $6.4 million. In August 2013, Cumulus decided to leave Maine and sold the radio stations to Townsquare Media.
