= 1160 AM =

AM radio frequency

The following radio stations broadcast on AM frequency 1160 kHz: in the United States and Mexico. Radio station KSL in Salt Lake City is the dominant Class A station on 1160 AM, a United States clear-channel frequency, according to the U.S. Federal Communications Commission (FCC).

== In Argentina ==
- Independencia in Lanus, Buenos Aires
- La Mas Santiagueña in Gregorio de Laferrere, Buenos Aires
- LRA57 in El Bolsón, Río Negro
- LRH253 Cataratas Puerto Iguazú
- LU32 in Olavarría, Buenos Aires

== In Colombia ==
- Su Presencia Radio in La Castellana, Bogotá

== In Mexico ==
- XEQIN-AM in San Quintin, Baja California

== In the United States ==
Stations in bold are clear-channel stations.

Call sign	City of license	Facility ID	Class	Daytime power (kW)	Nighttime power (kW)	Unlimited power (kW)	Transmitter coordinates
KBDT	Highland Park, Texas	28618	B	35	1		33.176944°N 97.676667°W (daytime); 33.039167°N 96.942778°W (nighttime)
KCTO	Cleveland, Missouri	136386	B	5	0.23		38.673889°N 94.607778°W
KRDY	San Antonio, Texas	26310	B	10	1		29.536389°N 98.686389°W
**KSL**	Salt Lake City, Utah	6375	A			50	40.779444°N 112.098889°W
WCCS	Homer City, Pennsylvania	55250	B	10	1		40.571667°N 79.17°W
WCFO	East Point, Georgia	15521	D	50	0.16		33.826111°N 84.605556°W
WCRT	Donelson, Tennessee	25031	B	50	1		36.163611°N 86.715556°W
WCVX	Florence, Kentucky	35065	B	5	0.99		38.969167°N 84.682222°W
WCXI	Fenton, Michigan	10475	B	15	0.4		42.544167°N 83.56°W (daytime); 42.544167°N 83.559444°W (nighttime)
WEWC	Callahan, Florida	11214	B	5	0.25		30.374444°N 81.741111°W
WJLK	Lakewood Township, New Jersey	49295	B	5	8.9		40.135833°N 74.23°W
WKCM	Hawesville, Kentucky	25966	D	2.5	0.055		37.905556°N 86.758056°W
WMET	Gaithersburg, Maryland	4643	B	50	1.5		39.187778°N 77.215556°W
WMTI	Barceloneta-Manati, Puerto Rico	54502	B	5	3.5		18.439722°N 66.551944°W
WODY	Fieldale, Virginia	69983	B	5	0.25		36.71°N 79.966111°W
WPIE	Trumansburg, New York	52124	B	5	0.31		42.545°N 76.710833°W
WRLZ	St. Cloud, Florida	135914	B	2.5	0.5		28.270833°N 81.333333°W
WSKW	Skowhegan, Maine	46351	B	10	0.73		44.745278°N 69.693333°W (daytime); 44.745°N 69.692222°W (nighttime)
WSSV	Mechanicville, New York	41582	B	5	0.57		42.92°N 73.702222°W
WVNJ	Oakland, New Jersey	68956	B	20	2.5		41.056389°N 74.249444°W
WWQT	Tryon, North Carolina	54614	B	25	0.5		35.238056°N 82.242778°W
WYDU	Red Springs, North Carolina	39240	B	5	0.25		34.839444°N 79.18°W
WYLL	Chicago, Illinois	28630	B	50	50		42.041667°N 87.865833°W (daytime); 41.573056°N 87.993611°W (nighttime)
