= WCRT (AM) =

Radio station in Donelson–Nashville, Tennessee

Donelson, Tennessee; United States
- Broadcast area: Nashville, Tennessee
- Frequency: 1160 kHz
- Branding: Bott Radio Network

Programming
- Format: Religious

Ownership
- Owner: Bott Communications, Inc.

History
- First air date: April 1971
- Former call signs: WAMB (1968–2006)
- Call sign meaning: Christian Radio Tennessee

Technical information
- Licensing authority: FCC
- Facility ID: 25031
- Class: B
- Power: 50,000 watts day; 1,000 watts night
- Transmitter coordinates: 36°9′49.2″N 86°42′56″W
- Translator: 107.1 W296DE (Donelson)

Links
- Public license information: Public file; LMS
- Webcast: Listen live
- Website: bottradionetwork.com/station/1160-am-nashville-tn/

Former FM transmitter
- WCRT-FM1

Donelson, Tennessee; United States
- Broadcast area: Nashville, Tennessee
- Frequency: 106.3 MHz
- Branding: Bott Radio Network

Programming
- Format: Religious

Ownership
- Owner: Bott Communications, Inc.

History
- First air date: August 14, 1990
- Former call signs: WAMB-FM1 (1990–2007)
- Former frequencies: 106.7 MHz (1990–1998); 98.7 MHz (1998–2009); 103.9 MHz (2009–2015)
- Call sign meaning: Christian Radio Tennessee

Technical information
- Facility ID: 166220
- Class: STA
- ERP: 75 watts
- HAAT: 83 meters (272 ft)
- Transmitter coordinates: 36°9′49″N 86°42′56″W (NAD27)

Links
- Public license information: Public file; LMS

WCRT (1160 kHz) is a Class B AM radio station licensed to the community of Donelson, Tennessee, near Nashville. Broadcasting a format of evangelical preaching and talk shows, WCRT is owned by Bott Communications, a Christian broadcaster, which bought the station, formerly WAMB, from longtime Nashville broadcaster Bill Barry (now deceased; he later operated a lower-powered WAMB on 1200 kHz).

WCRT broadcasts with 50,000 watts during the day and 1,000 watts at night. Because the 1160 kHz frequency receives interference from a Cuban radio station operating in excess of the officially notified power under international treaties, WCRT maintained a special temporary authority since 1990 from the Federal Communications Commission to operate an FM station at night as well. This station had the call sign WCRT-FM1 and, from 1998 on, operated from one of the WCRT (AM) towers. The last frequency for WCRT-FM1 is 106.3 MHz, the fourth frequency on which it operated since being authorized; the station was required to cease operations when a license was issued for a low-power station on the frequency, WXNS-LP. It has since been replaced by a normal translator, W296DE (107.1 FM).

AM 1160 is a United States clear-channel frequency, on which KSL in Salt Lake City is the dominant Class A station. WCRT must reduce power during nighttime hours in order to protect the skywave signals of KSL and WYLL in Chicago, both fulltime 50,000 watts signals. WYLL is a Class B station.

== See also ==
- List of Nashville media
