= WCTB =

Coordinates: 44.745°N 69.692°W

- Fairfield, Maine; United States
- Broadcast area: Augusta-Waterville, Maine
- Frequency: 93.5 MHz
- Branding: True Country 93.5

Programming
- Format: Classic country

Ownership
- Owner: Mix Maine Media; (J. Hanson Company, Inc.)
- Sister stations: WFMX; WSKW

History
- First air date: 1993

Technical information
- Licensing authority: FCC
- Facility ID: 46353
- Class: C3
- ERP: 10,500 watts
- HAAT: 152 meters (499 ft)
- Repeater: 1230 WGUY (Veazie)

Links
- Public license information: Public file; LMS
- Webcast: Listen live
- Website: truecountry935.com

WCTB is an FM radio broadcast station licensed to Fairfield, Maine, United States, with studios in Skowhegan. It broadcasts on 93.5 MHz with a classic country format, and is owned by J. Hanson Company, doing business as Mix Maine Media. Its programming is simulcast on WGUY in Veazie (near Bangor).

== History ==
WCTB originally signed on as an adult contemporary music station in 1993. In the late 1990s, the station went through several format changes, at times simulcasting the sports talk of WSKW and country music (both classic and current country) simulcasted on WCME (now WBQA).

In late 2003, when Clear Channel Broadcasting lost control of the station, WCTB began to stunt with Christmas music (as they had done every year from Thanksgiving to Christmas). In January 2004, the station began airing an eclectic mix of music, finally ending up with a classic hits format in April 2004.

With another ownership change in November 2004, WCTB changed to Christmas music again and after Christmas adopted a classic rock format that it kept until December 2010.

On December 27, 2018, WCTB changed its format from oldies to classic country, branded as "Cruisin' Country 93.5". On March 22, 2022, WCTB changed its branding to "True Country 93.5".

In November 2024, WGUY in Veazie (near Bangor), which had been an oldies station, began simulcasting WCTB under a time brokerage agreement.

== Programming ==
WCTB currently carries classic country with local programming and John Tesh nights. In January 2011, WSKW changed to a simulcast of WCTB, previously having simulcast the WSKW oldies format as Legacy 1160. WSKW changed to ESPN Radio the next month, which it had carried until September 2009.

== Former on-air slogans ==
- The River 93.5 (1993–1999, 2004, 2005–2010): adult contemporary music (1993–1999), classic hits (2004) and classic rock (2005–2010)
- The Score (1999): for a few months in 1999 when it simulcasted the sports programming of WSKW
- Kicks Country (1999–2001): WCTB and WCME changed to country when Clear Channel bought the station, moving the adult contemporary music to WKCG
- C-93 (2001–2003): classic country
- Central Maine's Christmas Station (1993–2004): the station frequently used this on air slogan when it changed to Christmas music every year
- 93.5 The Edge (2010): similar to The River but focused more on 1980s and 1990s rock
- Cruisin' 93.5 (2010–2018): playing 1960s and 1970s oldies.
- Cruisin' Country (2018–2022): classic country.

== Affiliated stations ==
- WFMX "Mix 107.9"
- WSKW "Legacy 1160"
