= WEZQ =

- Bangor, Maine; United States
- Broadcast area: Bangor, Maine
- Frequency: 92.9 MHz
- Branding: 92.9 The Ticket

Programming
- Format: Sports
- Affiliations: ESPN Radio; Boston Red Sox Radio Network; Boston Bruins Radio Network; Boston Celtics Radio Network; New England Patriots Radio Network

Ownership
- Owner: Townsquare Media; (Townsquare License, LLC)
- Sister stations: WBZN, WDEA, WQCB, WWMJ

History
- First air date: June 9, 1976
- Former call signs: WPBC (1976–1992); WSHZ (1992–1993)

Technical information
- Licensing authority: FCC
- Facility ID: 17673
- Class: B
- ERP: 20,000 watts
- HAAT: 240 meters (790 ft)
- Transmitter coordinates: 44°45′35.2″N 68°33′53.1″W

Links
- Public license information: Public file; LMS
- Webcast: Listen live
- Website: www.929theticket.com

WEZQ (92.9 MHz; "The Ticket") is a commercial FM radio station broadcasting a sports format. Licensed to Bangor, Maine, United States, the station signal extends to Bar Harbor and Belfast on the coast, to Howland to the north. The station is currently owned by Townsquare Media and features programming from ESPN Radio.

The Ticket's weekday schedule includes some local sports talk, as well as syndicated shows from ESPN Radio. It is also the Bangor outlet for Boston Red Sox, Boston Bruins, Boston Celtics and New England Patriots games.

== History ==
The station signed on the air June 9, 1976, as WPBC, a beautiful music station owned by Penobscot Broadcasting. It became WSHZ in 1992, after the station evolved to a soft adult contemporary format, placing it in competition with Ellsworth station WKSQ.

In October 1993, WSHZ was purchased by Dudman Communications, owner of WDEA and WWMJ in Ellsworth. That December, the station changed its call sign to WEZQ. However, the "Soft Hits 92.9" branding used as WSHZ was retained for several years after becoming WEZQ. Dudman sold its stations to Cumulus Media in 1998. In later years, WEZQ carried syndicated adult contemporary shows from Delilah and The Bob and Sheri Show.

On July 31, 2012, Cumulus swapped 55 stations, including WEZQ, to Townsquare Media in exchange for Townsquare's stations in Bloomington and Peoria, Illinois. On January 1, 2013, Townsquare relaunched WEZQ with a sports format as "92.9 The Ticket".

In 2018, WEZQ became the Bangor affiliate for the Boston Red Sox Radio Network, taking over from longtime Red Sox station WZON. On October 25, 2021, the station became one of the inaugural affiliates of Toucher and Rich from WBZ-FM in Boston, along with the commonly-owned trimulcast of WCYY, WPKQ, and WJZN. The station dropped Toucher and Rich in 2023.
