= Time gain compensation =

Time gain compensation (TGC) is a setting applied in diagnostic ultrasound imaging to account for tissue attenuation. By increasing the received signal intensity with depth, the artifacts in the uniformity of a B-mode image intensity are reduced.

This means that a TGC module will increase the amount of gain given to an input signal, as its sampling time increases monotonically. This counteracts the excessive sound-dampening properties of human tissue.
