= WFCN =

- Nashville, Tennessee; United States
- Broadcast area: Nashville area
- Frequency: 1200 kHz (AM stereo)

Programming
- Format: Christian radio
- Affiliations: Moody Radio

Ownership
- Owner: Moody Bible Institute
- Sister stations: WYJV; WFCM-FM

History
- First air date: December 1968
- Former call signs: WLSN (1968−1981); WQDQ (1981−1984, 1987−1998, 2000−2002); WQZQ (1984−1987); WKDA (1998−2000, 2002−2006); WAMB (2006−2016)

Technical information
- Licensing authority: FCC
- Facility ID: 72879
- Class: D
- Power: 2,000 watts (days only)
- Transmitter coordinates: 36°12′30.2″N 86°52′21″W
- Translator: 98.7 W254CK (Nashville)

Links
- Public license information: Public file; LMS
- Webcast: Listen live
- Website: moodyradio.org/stations/nashville

WFCN (1200 AM) is a radio station licensed to Nashville, Tennessee, United States, airing a Christian radio format. WFCN is owned by the Chicago-based Moody Bible Institute and it simulcasts its sister station in nearby Murfreesboro, Tennessee, WFCM-FM (91.7). Programming on WFCN is rebroadcast on FM translator 98.7, W254CK.

== History ==
WFCN first signed on the air in December 1968 as 1190 AM, WAMB. It was the brainchild of longtime Nashville broadcaster Bill Barry, who realized in the 1960s that the switch of many popular radio stations to varied youth-oriented formats, frequently from a full-service orientation, was alienating many older listeners, a large segment of whom were nostalgic for the big band sound of 1930s and 1940s popular music and a station that would play it. To some degree, Barry sought to exploit what was termed the "generation gap" between teenagers and parents of that time, with WAMB favoring the latter. The station was originally licensed to the Nashville neighborhood of Donelson. Airing a format called "The Music of Your Life", it was a pioneer of adult standards music. The format eventually spread to hundreds of stations throughout North America.

From a small start, Barry decided to eschew mainstream broadcasters' increasing focus then on younger people with a counter-marketing strategy. He and his sales staff instead attracted and cultivated advertisers whose products appealed largely to older listeners – Cadillac automobiles, retirement homes, prepaid funeral plans, and medical services (once the FCC started allowing those providers to advertise). Barry eventually was able to raise the station's daytime power to the legal maximum of 50,000 watts, although the station could not broadcast at night due to the clear channel system of AM frequencies in North America (see above).

Barry's station and its programming attracted a small (by mass-market radio standards) but intensely loyal listening audience; WAMB and its advertisers enjoyed the fact that it had little other competition in Nashville radio, except perhaps from some easy listening outlets on FM. Barry served his listeners with hourly news, which began disappearing from many music-format stations once the FCC stopped requiring radio broadcasters to deliver at least five minutes of it each broadcast hour. Barry nonetheless knew that news was very important to much of his mature audience, as well as investment news (market research revealing that his audience had a far larger-than-average net worth).

The primary threat to Barry and WAMB became the passage of time, and Barry's original business model, once very profitable, would eventually become unsustainable. Each year, a certain percentage of his targeted audience died and, for the most part, was not replaced by younger listeners, most of whom were either unfamiliar with the big-band genre or else disliked it due to its elderly image, as portrayed often in general American popular culture from the 1960s onward (see "generation gap" above). In recognition of this fact and to compensate for it, some newer music from the "easy-listening" category of artists such as The Carpenters, Roger Whittaker, and Harry Connick, Jr. (favorite artists of some in the Baby Boom generation especially) was admitted to WAMB's playlist, but the station's demographics continued to skew far older than any other major Nashville station. This was becoming an increasing liability given the Nashville area's strong and steady population growth (which exploded around the time of the station's demise), bringing a much more competitive radio scene than when Barry started, thus making his position among advertisers more precarious than before. In particular, few of Nashville's newer residents were interested in the specialty programming WAMB featured; the overwhelming majority belonged to the key demographic of ages 18 to 49, a group Barry practically made a career of ignoring. In turn, young adults, except those who enjoyed talk radio or foreign-language formats (i.e., immigrants), usually ignored the AM dial of their radios anyway. All of these issues added up to little to no possibility of audience growth. In recognition of these realities, Barry decided to try to cut his losses, and he sold the 1160 kHz frequency in late 2005 to religious radio broadcaster Bott Communications. Bott took over the frequency in early 2006 and changed the format to a Christian one, with a standard emphasis on evangelical/fundamentalist preaching and conservative talk shows in keeping with the stringent ethics of those faiths. To reflect the station's new identity and audience, Bott had the call sign of 1160 kHz changed to WCRT. Even after the sale, Barry opted to try again, by moving the big-band/adult standards format and WAMB callsign to a new frequency (with power greatly reduced, thereby less expensive), 1200 kHz. Later Barry acquired another FM frequency, 99.3, for simulcasting purposes, to air the station at night, when 1200 AM had to cease broadcasting (see above); this continued until shortly after his death.

=== Roundtable ===
WAMB was the last Nashville radio station to carry Teddy Bart's Roundtable weekday morning discussion program. Bart, a veteran Nashville broadcaster who came to the city originally as a lounge singer and musician in the 1950s performing in the city's Printer's Alley district, and co-host Karlen Evins interviewed newsmakers involved in Tennessee politics on the two-hour show, which began originally on WLAC in the mid-1980s and had been heard on several other stations, including one owned by Bart himself for a time, in the 1990s. The non-profit organization founded by Bart and Evins to produce the program discontinued production in the summer of 2005, due to increasing debts and declining listenership (and thus donations). Elsewhere in the state, cable television systems and Martin's WLJT, the PBS affiliate for rural West Tennessee, carried a video version of Roundtable, with a camera positioned inside the radio control room. Like almost all of the rest of WAMB's programming, Roundtable mainly appealed to an older audience, most of whom were probably area natives. Unlike other talk radio programs of that time, however, Bart and Evins did not allow panelists or guests to make personal (ad hominem) attacks or act in an uncivil or rude manner (e.g., interrupting other speakers, especially in a loud voice) on their broadcasts, an etiquette code that was strictly enforced. Violators were seldom if ever permitted to appear on the program again.

Later, Bart and Evins offered a regular podcast titled "Beyond Reason," an exploration of religious and metaphysical interpretation of current events; both hosts long maintained interests in the paranormal. This continued until shortly before Bart's death in December 2014.

=== Format change: January 2014 ===
Station owner Bill Barry died in September 2013 at the age of 88. In the wake of his death, his family entered into an LMA with Silva Entertainment, which in January 2014 changed the station's format to Spanish-language pop music, ending over four decades of big-band music and adult standards as the station's staple programming. This format, though, ended abruptly after just eight months in September 2014 and was replaced by a simulcast of Lebanon's WANT, which aired Westwood One's "Real Country" format.

=== Ownership change: June 2016 ===
Effective June 8, 2016, WAMB was bought by Moody Radio to simulcast the Christian radio programming heard on nearby station WFCM-FM in Murfreesboro. To make a clean break with the past, the station changed its call sign to WFCN on June 9, 2016. WFCN was taken off the air in order to conduct repairs on the transmitter.

== See also ==
- List of Nashville media
