= WKIT =

Radio station in Bangor, Maine

Brewer, Maine; United States
- Broadcast area: Bangor, Maine
- Frequency: 100.3 MHz (HD Radio)
- Branding: 100.3 WKIT

Programming
- Format: Mainstream rock
- Affiliations: Compass Media Networks; United Stations Radio Networks

Ownership
- Owner: Jeff Solari and Greg Hawes; (Rock Lobster Radio, LLC)

History
- First air date: February 14, 1979; 46 years ago
- Former call signs: WGUY-FM (1979–1987); WKIT-FM (1987–2020)
- Former frequencies: 100.9 MHz (1979–1988)

Technical information
- Licensing authority: FCC
- Facility ID: 25747
- Class: B
- ERP: 16,000 watts
- HAAT: 269 meters (883 ft)
- Transmitter coordinates: 44°40′39.3″N 68°45′13.1″W

Links
- Public license information: Public file; LMS
- Webcast: Listen live
- Website: www.wkitfm.com

WKIT (100.3 FM) is a commercial radio station licensed to Brewer, Maine, serving the Bangor area of Central Maine. It airs a mainstream rock radio format. WKIT's main competitors are WWMJ, a classic rock station in Ellsworth, and WTOS, a mainstream rock station that simulcasts WTOS-FM from Skowhegan.

Jeff Solari and Greg Hawes own WKIT through Rock Lobster Radio, LLC. The station has studios and offices on Broadway in Bangor. The transmitter is off Center Drive in Orrington, Maine.

Unlike many U.S. radio stations, WKIT still has a strong presence of live local announcers in the studio. However, on the weekends the station carries some syndicated programming. WKIT also streams its programming on the Internet via the official station website. Notable on air personalities include the Rock and Roll Morning Show hosts Don Cookson and Mark "The Shark" Young, midday host Jason “Rock Dog” Roberts, afternoon host Scotty Moore, and simulcasting Nights With Alice Cooper.

The station went on the air in 1979 as top 40 station WGUY-FM, the FM sister station to WGUY (1250 AM). It became WKIT-FM in 1987, initially with a "hip adult" format before shifting to rock. From 1995 to 2025, the station was part of the Zone Corporation, the broadcasting group owned by author Stephen King; after he announced the closure of Zone's stations—WKIT, WZLO, and WZON—at the end of 2024, Solari and Hawes bought WKIT and kept it on the air.

== History ==
Following ten years of delays, the station signed on February 14, 1979, as WGUY-FM on 100.9 MHz. It was owned by Stone Communications along with WGUY (1250 AM); the stations simulcast a top 40 format, but WGUY-FM was able to operate 24 hours a day, in contrast to the AM station's daytime-only operation. From the start, plans were in place to eventually separate the WGUY stations' programming; on November 30, 1981, the AM station relaunched as Music of Your Life station WMLI, while WGUY-FM continued the contemporary hit radio programming.

Stone Communications sold WGUY-FM and WGUY (1200 AM) to John Pineau's Sunspot Broadcasting for $1 million in 1987. Pineau changed the call sign to WKIT-FM, relaunched the station with a "hip adult" format, added newscasts from the ABC Direction Network, and announced plans to move to 100.3 MHz with a larger signal. WKIT-FM moved to 100.3 in October 1988.

After filing for chapter 11 bankruptcy, Sunspot Broadcasting sold WKIT-FM and WKIT (AM) to Eric D. Hake and Raymond H. Lynch's H & L Broadcasting for $293,000 in 1991. Author Stephen King, who already owned WZON, bought WKIT-FM and the AM station—by then WNSW—from H & L in 1995 for $800,000; WKIT, which was valued at $450,000, joined WZON as part of the Zone Corporation. While King planned no changes to WKIT's "Rock 100" programming or WNSW's news/talk format, WNSW would be closed down on October 24, 1995.

On Stephen King's official website, there was an advertisement for WKIT. In his novel 11/22/63, Jake saves most of the Dunning family, and when he comes back to 2011 he looks up Ellen Dunning (who was 7 in 1958) and calls her, learning she is a "jock for WKIT in Bangor, you know, a disk jockey?".

On December 2, 2024, King announced that WKIT as well as its sister stations WZLO and WZON would cease broadcasting at the end of the month, citing ongoing financial losses. Subsequently, on December 23, Jeff Solari and Greg Hawes, through Rock Lobster Radio, announced that they would acquire WKIT, and would begin operating the station under a local marketing agreement (LMA) on January 1, 2025. Solari had previously served as a reporter for WLBZ and a sports talk host for WZON and WEZQ, while Hawes owns restaurants and a marijuana dispensary in the Bangor area. Rock Lobster completed the acquisition in March 2025. WZLO and WZON, whose closures went forward, would be separately sold to Mix Maine Media in February 2025; on October 31, 2025, Rock Lobster Radio announced that Mix Maine Media would acquire WKIT as well, with an LMA taking effect on November 1.
