= The Grantsmanship Center =

- Type: Private (1984–present); Nonprofit (1972–1984)
- Founded: 1972
- Founder: Norton Kiritz
- Headquarters: Los Angeles, California, United States
- Area served: Worldwide
- Key people: Norton Kiritz (Founder); Cathleen Kiritz (President & CEO); Barbara Floersch (Former Director)
- Products: Grantsmanship Training Program; Alumni Membership Program
- Website: www.tgci.com

The Grantsmanship Center is a private training, and resource organization for nonprofit academic and government agencies around the globe. The Center was founded in 1972 in Los Angeles, where it is still headquartered. The Center's training programs and publications cover grant management, applying for federal grants, social enterprise for non-profits, and writing proposals for research funding. As of 2019, the Center had trained more than 140,000 people.

== History ==
The Grantsmanship Center was founded in 1972 by Norton J. Kiritz as a 501(c)(3) nonprofit to offer grantsmanship training to members of nonprofits and government agencies. The Center began as a local project in Los Angeles. In 1975, The Grantsmanship Center was conducting more than 100 workshops a year across the United States. Since 1972, they have trained over 140,000 people.

In the late 1970s and early 1980s, the Center also had an office in Washington, DC.

In 1984, after being affected by the federal spending cutbacks of the Reagan Administration, the board recommended the closing of the organization. Mr. Kiritz converted the center into a for-profit corporation.

In 1999, The Grantsmanship Center created the Alumni Membership Program. The Center's Alumni Membership includes review of a proposal, access to The Grantsmanship Center's funding databases and to 990-PFs, and others. Alumni receive access to an online forum and a 6- or 12-month membership as part of tuition, depending on which class they take.

In 2006, Mr. Kiritz died. His wife of 22 years, Cathleen, took over the running of the organization.

== Workshops ==
The Grantsmanship Center provides workshops to individuals and organizations across the United States. It has also done workshops internationally when requested.

The Grantsmanship Training Program is a five-day workshop designed for both novice and experienced grant seekers. It is the most frequently attended workshop. After first learning the basics, participants break into groups, write grant proposals together and then review other groups' proposals. Participants later look into finding funding sources.

The Social Enterprise for Nonprofits training is a two-day workshop that teaches participants about generating unrestricted funds.

The Research Proposal Workshop is a three-day seminar that teaches students how to obtain funding for their research projects.

The Competing for Federal Grants training is a five-day workshop that focuses on obtaining grants from the US Government.

The Essential Grant Skills training is a two-day program that skips the hands-on portion of the Grantsmanship Training Program.

Project Grantsmanship has 90% of its tuition paid by the Annenberg Foundation, Dwight Stuart Youth Fund, Ralph M. Parsons Foundation, and the California Community Foundation. The Center also creates customized training workshops based on the requests of its clients. It also has a Q&A session at the end with local grantmakers.

== Publications ==
In 1972, Mr. Kiritz wrote and published Program Planning & Proposal Writing. It has been called "the proposal writer's bible".

Grantsmanship: Program Planning & Proposal Writing, 2nd ed., published in 2017, was updated and expanded by Barbara Floersch, former Chief of Training & Curriculum at The Grantsmanship Center.

The Grantsmanship Center News is a magazine first published in 1972. The Grantsmanship Center Magazine ran from the early 1990s to 2005. At their peak, these publications had a circulation of around 200,000 copies. Its archives are available at the Library of Congress.
