= WNSW (Maine) =

Radio station in Brewer, Maine (1947–1995)

- Brewer, Maine; United States
- Broadcast area: Bangor, Maine
- Frequency: 1200 kHz

Ownership
- Owner: Stephen King and Tabitha King; (Twelve Hundred, Inc.)

History
- First air date: September 20, 1947; 78 years ago
- Last air date: October 24, 1995; 30 years ago
- Former call signs: WGPG (CP, 1947); WGUY (1947–1981); WMLI (1981–1987); WKIT (1987–1991)

Technical information
- Facility ID: 25748
- Power: 10,000 watts
- Transmitter coordinates: 44°46′23″N 68°49′45″W

WNSW was a radio station on 1200 AM in Brewer, Maine, operating between September 20, 1947, and October 24, 1995.

== History ==
The Portland Broadcasting System, Inc., received the construction permit to build a new radio station at 1450 kHz in Bangor on January 31, 1947. The call letters WGPG were soon ditched for WGUY, representing Guy Gannett, the original owner. The station went on the air on September 20, broadcasting with 250 watts, and affiliated with CBS on August 1, 1949, matching sister station WGAN in Portland and leaving behind its initial hookup with ABC. WGUY's short-lived FM counterpart, WGUY-FM 93.1, was the first FM station in Maine.

After WGUY moved to 1230 kHz in 1950, Murray Carpenter acquired WGUY in 1954. Carpenter's ownership of the station was short, but it resulted in the deletion of WGUY-FM on October 22 of that year. Carpenter quickly sold WGUY to the Bangor Broadcasting Company, led by Sherwood Tarlow. Carpenter retained the studios on Mount Hope Avenue, which were used to launch his television station, WTWO; WGUY and WTWO shared the building for a time. In 1957, an application was made to increase power to 5,000 watts day on 1250 kHz, which was approved two years later. While the application was pending, Tarlow sold the Bangor Broadcasting Corporation to a new partnership led by Melvin Stone, David Royte and Faust Couture. Stone and Couture owned the Lobster Network, a statewide hookup of stations commonly represented for advertising purposes, which WGUY would join in 1956. Stone would ultimately take full control of WGUY. A new FM station, WGUY-FM, signed on in 1979.

After four years, in 1980, the FCC approved the relocation of WGUY to Brewer and the addition of 5,000 watts of power at night. On November 30, 1981, WGUY was relaunched as WMLI with an adult standards format supplied by the Music of Your Life service; its previous contemporary hit radio programming continued on WGUY-FM.

In 1985, the station was approved to move to 1200 kHz and upgrade to 10,000 watts. Stone sold the station to Sunspot Broadcasting in 1987; Sunspot renamed the station WKIT (and WGUY-FM became WKIT-FM). When Sunspot filed for bankruptcy protection in 1991, the station was sold again to H&L Broadcasting; it relaunched as talk station WNSW that same year. In April 1992, the station changed its programming to the audio of CNN Headline News. The station also carried play-by-play of the New England Patriots before H&L decided in advance of the 1995 season to move game broadcasts to WKIT-FM.

WNSW and WKIT-FM were sold in 1995 to authors Tabitha King and Stephen King; the Kings also owned WZON 620 AM. While King planned no changes to the stations' programming, on October 24, 1995, WNSW was closed down permanently, with station management citing its high costs of operation and lack of revenues; most programs did not find a home on other King stations, though Boston Bruins play-by-play moved to WZON. As the station had been run primarily by automation, no jobs were lost.
