= WSKW =

Coordinates: 44°44′43.23″N 69°41′34.18″W

- Skowhegan, Maine; United States
- Broadcast area: Augusta-Waterville, Maine
- Frequency: 1160 kHz
- Branding: 1160 The Score

Programming
- Format: Sports
- Affiliations: Infinity Sports Network

Ownership
- Owner: Mix Maine Media; (J. Hanson Company, Inc.)
- Sister stations: WCTB; WFMX

History
- First air date: March 17, 1956
- Former call signs: WGHM (1956–1972); WSKW (1972–1980); WQMR (1980–1987)
- Call sign meaning: Skowhegan

Technical information
- Licensing authority: FCC
- Facility ID: 46351
- Class: B
- Power: 10,000 watts day; 730 watts night

Links
- Public license information: Public file; LMS
- Webcast: Listen live
- Website: 1160thescore.com

WSKW (1160 kHz) is a commercial AM radio station licensed to Skowhegan, Maine. It is owned by J. Hanson Company, doing business as Mix Maine Media, and it carries a radio format of sports from Infinity Sports Network. The studios and offices are in the Lee Farm Mall in Augusta.

WSKW broadcasts with 10,000 watts by day and uses a non-directional antenna at all times. Because AM 1160 is a clear channel frequency reserved for Class A station KSL in Salt Lake City, WSKW must reduce power at night to 730 watts to avoid interference. The transmitter is off Middle Road (State Route 104) in Skowhegan.

== History ==
WSKW signed on the air on March 17, 1956. It originally broadcast on AM 1150 using the call sign WGHM. The station was powered at 1,000 watts and was a daytimer, required to go off the air at sunset each evening. It was owned by the Pineland Broadcasting Company.

In the 1970s, the station changed to a Top 40 format with the WSKW call letters. It changed the call sign to WQMR in the late 1970s and simulcast the album rock format on co-owned WTOS-FM. Later, it aired an automated classic country format for several years, eventually changing call letters again to WQMR.

In the late 1980s, as a country music formatted station, the station reverted to WSKW, changing frequencies to AM 1160 and upgrading the signal to 10,000 watts of power in the daytime.

The station switched to sports talk in the mid-1990s, originally carrying the One on One Sports Network. It later switched to ESPN Radio, also carrying Boston Red Sox baseball. For a time, the sports format was simulcasted on co-owned WHQO (now WFMX). WSKW also carried New York Yankees and Portland Sea Dogs baseball, as well as NASCAR races from the Motor Racing Network. In addition, local high school sports were broadcast.

In September 2009, the station dropped all sports programming except for local high school sports, flipping to an oldies music format, focusing on the 1960s. For several months, WSKW was carried on WXME in Monticello as The Legacy Radio Network - The Great 78 and Legacy 1160 before WXME reverted to its previous talk radio format in the summer of 2010. In December 2010, co-owned WCTB flipped to oldies, with WSKW changing to a simulcast of WCTB in January 2011. A short time later, WSKW returned to the ESPN sports broadcasts it had held previous to September 2009. In November 2011, the sports format was dropped, along with local sports in favor of an automated classic country format.

In August 2019, WSKW returned to using the Legacy 1160 slogan, this time combining 1960s and 1970s oldies music with local talk shows on weekday mornings and coverage of local high school sports. Well-known local radio personalities Mike Violette and Jon James were the first to sign on under the new format.

On March 14, 2022, WSKW dropped the oldies and talk programming and returned to sports, branded as "1160 The Score". Mike Violette's local morning show and WSKW's high school sports coverage were retained, with the remainder of the station's programming being supplied by CBS Sports Radio (now Infinity Sports Network).

== Affiliated stations ==
- WFMX "Mix 107.9"
- WCTB "True Country 93.5"
