= Maine Public Broadcasting Network =

PBS and NPR member networks in Maine

- Branding: Maine Public
- Country: United States
- First air date: November 13, 1961 (WCBB)
- Broadcast area: statewide Maine
- Owner: Maine Public Broadcasting Corporation
- Launch date: September 23, 1963 (original MPBN); July 1, 1992 (current incarnation)
- Digital channel: see § Television stations
- Affiliations: PBS, APT, NPR, BBC, CBC, PRX, APM
- Former affiliations: NET (1961–1970)
- Official website: www.mainepublic.org

The Maine Public Broadcasting Network (abbreviated MPBN and branded as Maine Public) is a network of public television and radio stations located in the U.S. state of Maine. It is operated by the Maine Public Broadcasting Corporation, which holds the licenses for all the PBS and NPR stations licensed in the state. MPBN has studios and offices on Marginal Lane in Portland, on Lisbon Street in Lewiston, and on the campus of the University of Maine at Augusta, Bangor on Texas Avenue in Bangor.

MPBN's television network shows a block of standard PBS programming, as well as many documentaries including nature programs and other science programs. MPBN's radio network airs news and talk programming from NPR, locally produced news programming, jazz and classical music.

MPBN's television and radio signals reach virtually all of the populated portions of Maine, and nearby parts of New Hampshire and Massachusetts as well as the Canadian provinces of New Brunswick and Quebec. MPBN Television is also carried on cable television in parts of Quebec and most of New Brunswick, Nova Scotia, Prince Edward Island, and Newfoundland and Labrador.

== History ==
What is now Maine Public dates from the 1992 merger of WCBB, the PBS member station for most of southern Maine, with the original MPBN radio and television stations operated by the University of Maine System.

On November 13, 1961, WCBB signed on the air, based in Lewiston, as the first educational television station in Maine and the third in New England, after WGBH-TV in Boston and WENH-TV in Durham, New Hampshire. Licensed to Augusta, it was a joint venture of Colby College, Bates College, and Bowdoin College. Two years later, WMEB-TV began broadcasting from the University of Maine campus in Orono, near Bangor. Over the next decade, UMaine signed on three other stations across the state, as well as several translators. These stations formed the original MPBN network. One of them was WMEG-TV in Biddeford, near Portland (now WMEA-TV). However, it was practically unviewable over the air in Portland itself and mainly served communities from South Portland to York. The coverage area was improved when the station moved its digital channel on March 11, 2020.

The University of Maine System brought public radio to the state in 1970, when WMEH signed on from Bangor. Five other stations signed on over the next decade.

MPBN logo from 2005 to 2016

The two groups merged on July 1, 1992, to form the community-licensed Maine Public Broadcasting Corporation. MPBN's Bangor stations, WMEB-TV and WMEH (FM), became the flagship stations. The television stations adopted the on-air name "Maine Public Television", but dropped this in favor of "Maine PBS" in 1998. The radio stations became known as "Maine Public Radio". In 2005, both radio and television reverted to the "MPBN" moniker. On September 20, 2016, MPBN rebranded as "Maine Public".

Following the merger, WMEA-TV became the flagship station for a secondary PBS service, Maine Public Television Plus; unlike the main network, this service expanded its over-the-air reach through the use of low-power repeaters—W39BQ in Lewiston, which signed on January 1, 1994, and W30BF in Bangor, which launched on April 16, 1994. Cuts in federal funding led to the closing of MPT Plus on June 30, 1996; WMEA and W30BF then reverted to carrying the primary Maine Public Television service (though the latter station was sold in 1999 and became WCKD-LP), while W39BQ eventually ceased operations.

=== Radio programming ===
MPBN's radio service carries a mixed format of news and information from NPR, PRX (including programs from PRI before it merged with PRX), and other sources. Local programming includes Maine Calling, an interactive radio program hosted primarily by Jennifer Rooks and produced by Jonathan Smith. Various guests, often from Maine, are invited to participate in the discussion and audience members are encouraged to participate through calling in or through other forms of media.

In May 2016, the Maine Public Classical service was launched on the HD2 channels of the primary stations, as well as several new transmitters. The main network was eliminating classical music programming, with a three-hour weekday block between 9 a.m. and noon switching to news and talk shows. But the new network was aimed at giving listeners who enjoyed classical music a channel devoted to it, along with some jazz and other musical genres not usually heard on commercial radio stations.

=== Television programming ===
MPBN's television service carries the basic PBS program schedule, along with a handful of local programs, such as The Maine Experience (a feature magazine series), Maine Watch (a weekly public-affairs program), and live coverage of the annual Maine state high school basketball championship games.

== Controversies ==
=== Metropolitan Opera cancellation ===
In 2000, the live Metropolitan Opera radio broadcasts on Saturday afternoons, which had been a mainstay of classical music broadcasting for more than twenty years, was discontinued. Despite Maine Public Broadcasting's claims that the opera was being dropped due to lack of popularity among listeners, a citizens' protest forced the state network to reinstate the Saturday afternoon opera a few months later.

In the course of 24 months in 2000 and 2001, in what appeared to be a plan to significantly reduce local music programming, longtime classical music hosts Victor Hathaway, Virgil Bissett, Helen York and Dave Bunker left the station. Bissett retired, Bunker moved to southern Maine after his wife gained employment there. Despite Bunker's willingness to continue his popular morning music show from the Portland studios of MPBN, he was let go and Leitha Christie hired in his place. York resigned in protest.

=== The "Sugartime!" episode of Postcards from Buster ===
In May 2005, Maine Public Broadcasting joined a few other PBS stations in showing the controversial "Sugartime!" episode of Postcards from Buster. The program (a spinoff of Arthur) is about a cartoon rabbit named Buster Baxter, who travels the country with his father and interacts with children from different cultures and in different family structures. PBS headquarters had pulled the episode from its national broadcast schedule after receiving a critical letter from newly installed Education Secretary Margaret Spellings, who was upset that Buster was visiting a Vermont family headed by two women. WGBH, the Boston-based PBS affiliate and original producer of the program, subsequently made the episode available to stations that still wished to air it on an individual basis.

=== The Humble Farmer ===
Maine humorist Robert Skoglund was host of a weekly jazz and humor program called The Humble Farmer on MPBN starting in 1978. The show was canceled in 2007 after a series of disagreements over whether some of Skoglund's comments were in violation of the station's policy of neutrality on political issues. In 2003, in what came to be known as the War Rant, Skoglund spoke about a "weasely-faced war monger from way down south who didn't even get most of the popular vote", identifying the person as the author of Mein Kampf. In 2006, he read passages from Encyclopædia Britannica about Fascism under Mussolini. MPBN management regarded these to be veiled comparisons to then-President George W. Bush and admonished Skoglund to refrain from political commentary. On November 3, 2006, Skoglund submitted a prerecorded program in which he read a letter from a Maryland listener who described the effects of tax cuts in that state. MPBN regarded this as advocating a position on Maine's upcoming Taxpayer Bill of Rights referendum question and chose to not air the program. MPBN VP for Programming, Charles Beck, then sent Skoglund a letter outlining guidelines and warning him that further comments perceived as political would lead to the show's cancellation. Arguing that the strict guidelines were setting him up to fail, Skoglund discontinued all commentaries, speaking only to identify songs and musicians. In 2007, MPBN required on-air staff to sign a revised policy agreement on political neutrality. Skoglund refused to sign and his program was cut June 13, 2007.

=== Transmitter shutdowns ===
In December 2008, due to the economic crisis and a lack of state funding, MPBN announced plans on temporarily closing down WMED-TV and -FM in Calais, and WMEF FM in Fort Kent, for at least six months, beginning January 2009. In addition, MPBN's radio and television stations would leave the air for five hours each night, as an energy saving measure. However, many viewers and listeners complained to MPBN for their actions. Another concern is for MPBN's role as the state's primary carrier for the Emergency Alert System, which will be hampered during the times it is not on the air, as well as in areas where aerial service has been discontinued.

In part of the response from viewers and listeners in the affected regions, MPBN delayed their closures until February 28, 2009, at earliest. On February 12, 2009, MPBN officially rescinded plans to close down the transmitters, after responses from its viewers and listeners, as well as stakeholders, legislators, and then-Governor John Baldacci.

=== Appropriateness of state funding ===
In 2012, then-Governor Paul LePage proposed eliminating all state funding for MPBN from the budget, referring to such aid as "corporate welfare". The Republican-controlled Legislature rejected this proposal and instead passed a budget directing MPBN funding be changed to a fee-for-service model instead of a general appropriation over the next five years.

== Television stations ==
MPBN operates five full-power television stations:

Station	City of license (other cities served)	Channels (VC / RF)	First air date	Call letters' meaning	ERP	HAAT (Digital)	Facility ID	Transmitter coordinates	Public license information
WCBB^{1}	Augusta (Lewiston, Portland)	10; 20 (UHF)	November 13, 1961	Colby, Bates, and Bowdoin (original owners)	1,000 kW	304 m (997 ft)	39659	44°9′15″N 70°0′35″W	Public file LMS
WMEA-TV^{2}	Biddeford (Portland)	26; 36 (UHF)	March 15, 1975	Maine Educational	149 kW	231 m (758 ft)	39656	43°25′0.3″N 70°48′15.2″W	Public file LMS
WMEB-TV (flagship)	Orono (Bangor)	12; 22 (UHF)	September 23, 1963	Maine Educational Broadcasting	1,000 kW	293 m (961 ft)	39648	44°45′45″N 68°33′56″W	Public file LMS
WMED-TV	Calais	13; 10 (VHF)	September 15, 1965	Maine Educational Down East	3.5 kW	133 m (436 ft)	39649	45°1′45.2″N 67°19′22.9″W	Public file LMS
WMEM-TV	Presque Isle	10; 10 (VHF)	February 17, 1964	Maine Educational Media	14.5 kW	353 m (1,158 ft); 322 m (1,056 ft) (application)	39662	46°33′6.1″N 67°48′36″W; 46°33′2.5″N 67°48′31.8″W (application)	Public file LMS

Notes:

- 1. WCBB used the call sign WPTT during its construction permit from 1956 to 1961.
- 2. WMEA-TV used the callsign WMEG-TV from its 1975 sign-on until 1984.
- 3. All main MPBN stations shut down their analog signals on January 11, 2009, over a month ahead of the original February 17 transition date, causing many of MPBN's viewers to lose the signal.

=== Translators ===
- W03AM-D Harrison (translates WCBB)
- W04BS-D Bethel (translates WCBB)
- W05DD-D St. Francis (translates WMEM-TV)
- WMEB-TV (DRT) 25 Bangor (translates WMEB-TV)

=== Subchannels ===
The signals of MPBN's television stations are multiplexed:

MPBN multiplex
Subchannel	Res.	Short name	Programming
xx.1	1080i	MPBN-HD	PBS
xx.2	480i	CREATE	Create
xx.3	480i	WORLD	World
xx.4	480i	PBSKids	PBS Kids
23.2	480i	Charge!	Charge! (WPFO)
23.3	480i	Comet	Comet (WPFO)

Broadcast on behalf of another station (WCBB/WMEA-TV only)

On October 27, 2010, MPBN added PBS World programming to its .3 subchannel and in late 2014 replaced its SD feed on its .2 subchannel with Create. Both had been offered for several years on Time Warner Cable, which is available to a large number of subscribers throughout Maine. For the 2013 and 2014 Maine Legislature sessions, Maine Capitol Connection was on the .4 subchannel, replacing the PBS Kids children's programming.

=== Repack ===
Out of the five full power signals operated by MPBN, WMEA-TV was the only one required to change channels as part of the repack. The only UHF full power signal changed from RF channel 45 to channel 36 on March 13, 2020. WCBB was licensed to change from Channel 10 to channel 20 effective August 15, 2023.

== Radio stations ==
MPBN operates ten radio transmitters and four translators. Seven transmitters broadcast an FM signal and HD1 and HD2 channels. FM on those seven channels and HD1 is Maine Public Radio programming. HD2, WBQF, WBQE, WBQA and the four translators are dedicated to Maine Public Classical, which contains a large amount of Classical 24 and other classical and music programming. In 2021, MPBN applied for multiple new NCE licenses and was eventually granted seven construction permits for these new stations. Four have been allocated to its classical programming while three have been allocated to Maine Public Radio.

Call sign	Frequency	City of license	Facility ID	Class	ERP (W)	HAAT	Transmitter coordinates	Founded (Note: Exact dates reflect the date on which the FCC issued a license for the station. The station will normally have been operating under program test authority for some months prior.)	Program
WBQA	96.7 FM	Boothbay Harbor	4090	B1	15,500	127 m (417 ft)	44°1′31.3″N 69°34′15.2″W	1984 (acquired in 2017)	Maine Public Classical
WBQE	93.7 FM	Milbridge	84096	B	27,000	204 m (669 ft)	44°38′33.3″N 68°10′16.1″W	2005 (acquired in 2016)	Maine Public Classical
WBQF	91.7 FM	Fryeburg	174153	C3	250	551 m (1,808 ft)	43°51′30″N 70°42′39″W	2016	Maine Public Classical
WBEM	90.7 FM	Eastport		C3	4,900			2025	Maine Public Classical
WBSQ	91.1 FM	Monson		A	2,700			2025	Maine Public Classical
WFAS	88.7 FM	Fort Fairfield		C3	1,800			2025	Maine Public Classical
WBSJ	88.3 FM	Frenchville		C2	25,000			2025	Maine Public Classical
WMEA	90.1 FM	Portland	39655	C	24,500	578 m (1,896 ft)	43°51′30.3″N 70°42′39.2″W	April 1974	Maine Public Radio (also on HD) + Maine Public Classical (on HD2)
WMED	89.7 FM	Calais	39646	C2	30,000	160 m (525 ft)	45°1′45.3″N 67°19′24″W	June 22, 1984	Maine Public Radio (also on HD) + Maine Public Classical (on HD2)
WMEF	106.5 FM	Fort Kent	39653	C3	7,400	92 m (302 ft)	47°15′30.1″N 68°33′28.1″W	September 15, 1994	Maine Public Radio (also on HD) + Maine Public Classical (on HD2)
WMEH	90.9 FM	Bangor	39650	B	13,500	246 m (807 ft)	44°45′45.3″N 68°33′56.1″W	1970	Maine Public Radio (also on HD) + Maine Public Classical (on HD2)
WMEM	106.1 FM	Presque Isle	39661	C	100,000	327 m (1,073 ft)	46°33′6.1″N 67°48′36″W	1978	Maine Public Radio (also on HD) + Maine Public Classical (on HD2)
WMEP	90.5 FM	Camden	92566	B	2,000	371 m (1,217 ft)	44°12′40.2″N 69°9′14.1″W	February 4, 2002	Maine Public Radio (also on HD) + Maine Public Classical (on HD2)
WMEW	91.3 FM	Waterville	39645	A	3,000	91 m (299 ft)	44°29′23.2″N 69°39′3.1″W	August 30, 1984	Maine Public Radio (also on HD) + Maine Public Classical (on HD2)
WMHD	89.7 FM	Greenville		A	2,200			2025	Maine Public Radio
WBEO	91.3 FM	Bethel		A	1,500			2025	Maine Public Radio
WBSP	90.1 FM	Millinocket		A	1,200			2025	Maine Public Radio

=== Translators ===
Call sign	Frequency (MHz)	City of license	Facility ID	Class	ERP (W)	HAAT	Transmitter coordinates	Rebroadcasts	Founded	Program
W259BY	99.7	Waterville	142052	D	190	118 m (387 ft)	44°29′21.2″N 69°39′5.2″W	WMEW-HD2	2015	Maine Public Classical
W272CG	102.3	Sanford	148888	D	250	212 m (696 ft)	43°25′0.3″N 70°48′15.2″W	WMEA-HD2	2007 (acquired 2019)	Maine Public Classical
W281AC	104.1	Portland	87718	D	250	49 m (161 ft)	43°40′13.2″N 70°15′2.1″W	WMEA-HD2	2016	Maine Public Classical
W291CO	106.1	Bangor	139337	D	250	270 m (886 ft)	44°45′45.3″N 68°33′56.1″W	WMEH-HD2	2015	Maine Public Classical

== See also ==
- Suzanne Nance, former music director at MPBN
