= Veazie, Maine =

Town in Maine, United States

- Town
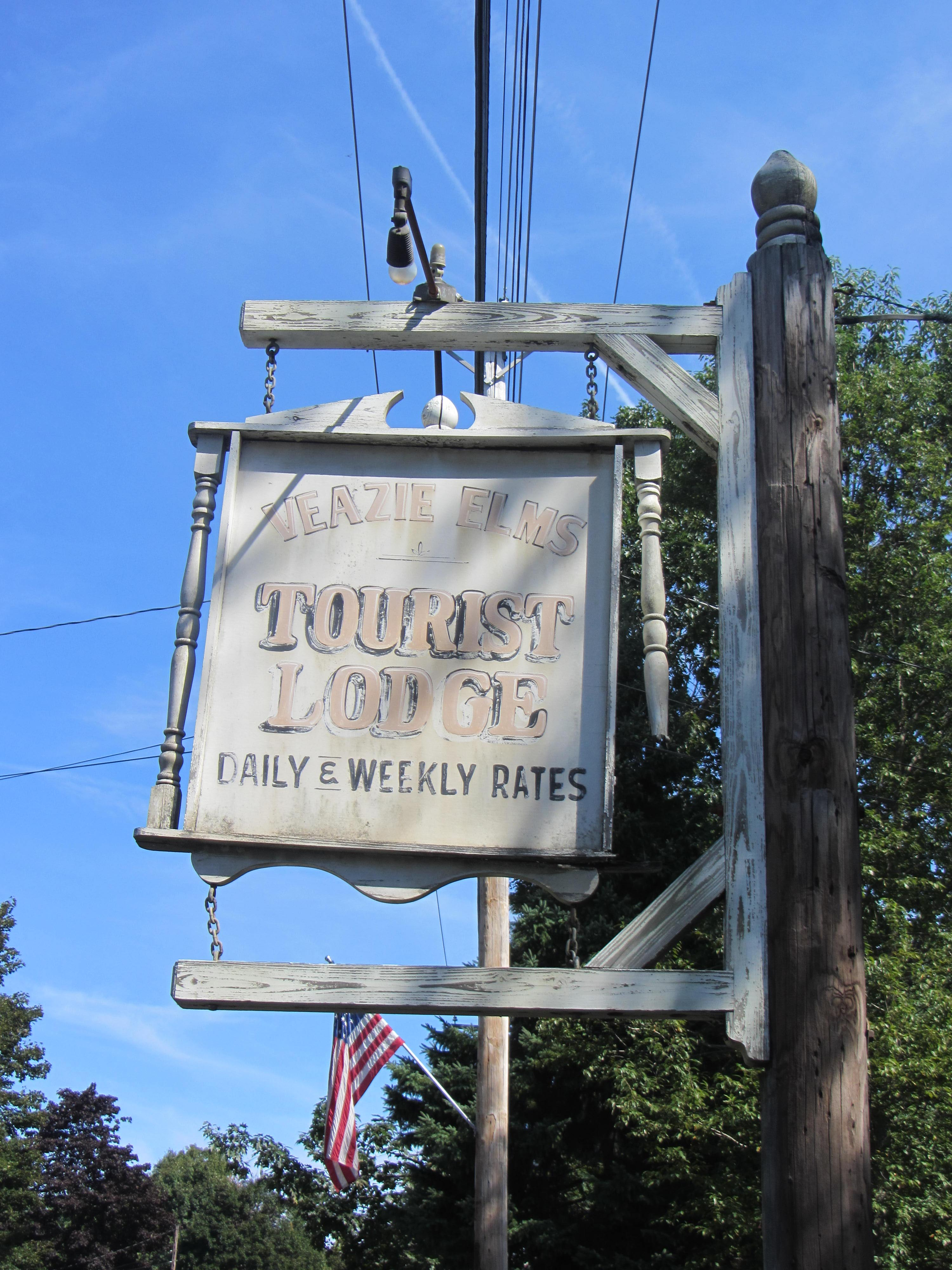
- Advertising sign in Veazie

- Logo

- Location within Maine Location within the United States
- Coordinates: 44°50′26″N 68°42′48″W
- Country: United States
- State: Maine
- County: Penobscot

Area
  - Total: 3.22 sq mi (8.34 km^{2})
  - Land: 3.03 sq mi (7.85 km^{2})
  - Water: 0.19 sq mi (0.49 km^{2})
- Elevation: 167 ft (51 m)

Population (2020)
  - Total: 1,814
  - Density: 599/sq mi (231.1/km^{2})
- Time zone: UTC-5 (Eastern (EST))
  - Summer (DST): UTC-4 (EDT)
- ZIP code: 04401
- Area code: 207
- FIPS code: 23-78780
- GNIS feature ID: 582779
- Website: www.veazie.net

Veazie is a town in Penobscot County, Maine, United States. The population was 1,814 at the 2020 census.

== History ==
The town was named after General Samuel Veazie, an early lumber baron and railroad operator. Veazie was originally part of Bangor, using Penobscot River water power to operate sawmills. It became a separate town in 1853 because General Veazie, its wealthiest citizen, felt that Bangor's property taxes were excessive.

== Geography ==
According to the United States Census Bureau, the town has a total area of 3.22 square miles (8.34 km^{2}), of which 3.03 square miles (7.85 km^{2}) is land and 0.19 square miles (0.49 km^{2}) is water.

== Demographics ==
Historical population
Census	Pop.	Note	%±
1860	893		—
1870	810		−9.3%
1880	622		−23.2%
1890	650		4.5%
1900	555		−14.6%
1910	557		0.4%
1920	504		−9.5%
1930	568		12.7%
1940	597		5.1%
1950	776		30.0%
1960	1,354		74.5%
1970	1,556		14.9%
1980	1,610		3.5%
1990	1,633		1.4%
2000	1,744		6.8%
2010	1,919		10.0%
2020	1,814		−5.5%
U.S. Decennial Census

=== 2010 census ===
As of the census of 2010, there were 1,919 people, 828 households and 498 families living in the town. The population density was 633.3 inhabitants per square mile (244.5/km^{2}). There were 884 housing units at an average density of 291.7 per square mile (112.6/km^{2}). The racial makeup of the town was 94.0% White, 0.7% African American, 1.4% Native American, 1.8% Asian, 0.2% from other races and 1.9% from two or more races. Hispanic or Latino of any race were 1.3% of the population.

There were 828 households, of which 27.1% had children under the age of 18 living with them, 46.0% were married couples living together, 10.1% had a female householder with no husband present, 4.0% had a male householder with no wife present and 39.9% were non-families. 30.0% of all households were made up of individuals, and 13.1% had someone living alone who was 65 years of age or older. The average household size was 2.31 and the average family size was 2.83.

The median age in the town was 43.4 years. 20.4% of residents were under the age of 18; 9.9% were between the ages of 18 and 24; 21.6% were from 25 to 44; 31.4% were from 45 to 64; and 16.7% were 65 years of age or older. The town was 47.7% male and 52.3% female.

=== 2000 census ===
As of the 2000 census, there were 1,744 people, 722 households and 495 families living in the town. The population density was 596.9 inhabitants per square mile (230.5/km^{2}). There were 767 housing units at an average density of 262.5 per square mile (101.4/km^{2}). The racial makeup of the town was 96.90% White, 0.11% African American, 0.86% Native American, 1.03% Asian and 1.09% from two or more races. Hispanic or Latino of any race were 0.57% of the population.

There were 722 households, out of which 29.9% had children under the age of 18 living with them, 54.6% were married couples living together, 11.4% had a female householder with no husband present, and 31.4% were non-families. 24.1% of all households were made up of individuals, and 9.1% had someone living alone who was 65 years of age or older. The average household size was 2.41 and the average family size was 2.85.

The town's population was 23.9% under the age of 18, 7.0% from 18 to 24, 27.4% from 25 to 44, 27.2% from 45 to 64 and 14.6% who were 65 years of age or older. The median age was 40 years. For every 100 females, there were 92.3 males. For every 100 females age 18 and over, there were 88.4 males.

The median income for a household in the town was $44,519, and the median income for a family was $54,583. Males had a median income of $38,456 versus $29,432 for females. The per-capita income for the town was $24,723. About 5.1% of families and 7.6% of the population were below the poverty line, including 7.9% of those under age 18 and 6.7% of those age 65 or older.

== Education ==
In 1996, Veazie residents voted to build a new elementary and middle school. The Veazie Community School replaced the John R. Graham School, which had opened in 1924.

The town ran its own high school from 1896 to 1901. Since its closure, students from Veazie attend neighboring high schools in Bangor or Orono.

== Government ==
The town manager of Veazie is Mark Leonard, who also is chief of the Veazie Police Department.

Veazie is part of the 8th district of the Maine Senate, which is currently represented by Democrat Mike Tipping. The town's representative in the Maine House is Democrat Sean Faircloth, who represents the state's 24th district.
