= List of concept albums =

Concept albums have been produced by bands and solo artists across all musical genres. In popular music, a concept album is an album that is "unified by a theme, which can be instrumental, compositional, narrative, or lyrical." The following is a list with specific verification by reliable sources of being notable concept albums.

== 0–9 ==
- 2nd Chapter of Acts – The Roar of Love (1980)
- The 1975 – A Brief Inquiry into Online Relationships (2018)

== A ==
- Ab-Soul – Control System (2012)
- A Tribe Called Red – We Are the Halluci Nation (2016)
- Acid Mothers Temple – St. Captain Freak Out & the Magic Bamboo Request (2002)
- Aesop Rock – Labor Days (2001)
- After Forever – Invisible Circles (2004)
- Against Me! – Searching for a Former Clarity (2005)
- Against Me! – Transgender Dysphoria Blues (2014)
- Ahab – The Call of the Wretched Sea (2006)
- Ahab – The Boats of the "Glen Carrig" (2015)
- Al Stewart – Past, Present, and Future (1973)
- Alan Klein – Well at Least It's British (1964)
- Alan Parsons – The Time Machine (1999)
- The Alan Parsons Project – Tales of Mystery and Imagination (1976)
- The Alan Parsons Project – I Robot (1977)
- The Alan Parsons Project – Pyramid (1978)
- The Alan Parsons Project – Eve (1979)
- The Alan Parsons Project – The Turn of a Friendly Card (1980)
- The Alan Parsons Project – Eye in the Sky (1982)
- The Alan Parsons Project – Ammonia Avenue (1984)
- The Alan Parsons Project – Vulture Culture (1985)
- The Alan Parsons Project – Stereotomy (1985)
- The Alan Parsons Project – Gaudi (1987)
- Alanis Morissette – Jagged Little Pill (1995)
- Alesana – The Emptiness (2010)
- Alesana – A Place Where the Sun Is Silent (2011)
- Alesana – Confessions (2015)
- Alex Cameron – Forced Witness (2017)
- Alex Cameron – Miami Memory (2019)
- Alice Cooper – School's Out (1972)
- Alice Cooper – Billion Dollar Babies (1973)
- Alice Cooper – Welcome to My Nightmare (1975)
- Alice Cooper – Alice Cooper Goes to Hell (1976)
- Alice Cooper – From the Inside (1978)
- Alice Cooper – The Last Temptation (1994)
- Alice Cooper – Along Came a Spider (2008)
- Alice Cooper – Welcome 2 My Nightmare (2011)
- Alice Cooper – Paranormal (2017)
- Alice Cooper – Detroit Stories (2021)
- Alice Cooper – Road (2023)
- Alice in Chains – Dirt (1992)
- Allen Toussaint – Southern Nights (1975)
- Alter Bridge – AB III (2010)
- AJR – Neotheater (2019)
- AJR – The Maybe Man (2023)
- Amon Amarth – Jomsviking (2016)
- Anaïs Mitchell – Hadestown (2010)
- Ancient – The Cainian Chronicle (1996)
- Andrew Lloyd Webber – Evita (1976)
- Andy Black – The Ghost of Ohio (2019)
- Andy Shauf - The Party (2016)
- Angels and Airwaves – We Don't Need To Whisper (2006)
- Angels and Airwaves – I-Empire (2007)
- Angels and Airwaves – Love (2010)
- Angels and Airwaves – Love: Part Two (2011)
- Angels and Airwaves – The Dream Walker (2014)
- Angra – Temple of Shadows (2004)
- The Antlers – Hospice (2009)
- Aphrodites Child – 666 (1972)
- The Apples In Stereo – Travellers In Space and Time (2010)
- The Appleseed Cast – Mare Vitalis (2000)
- Arcade Fire – Funeral (2004)
- Arcade Fire – Neon Bible (2007)
- Arcade Fire – The Suburbs (2010)
- Arcade Fire – Reflektor (2013)
- Arcade Fire – Everything Now (2017)
- Arctic Monkeys – Whatever People Say I Am, That's What I'm Not (2006)
- Arctic Monkeys – Tranquility Base Hotel & Casino (2018)
- Armor for Sleep – What to Do When You Are Dead (2005)
- Attack Attack! – This Means War (2012)
- Aurora – A Different Kind of Human (Step 2) (2019)
- Aurora – The Gods We Can Touch (2022)
- The Avalanches – Since I Left You (2000)
- Ava Max – Heaven & Hell (2020)
- Avantasia – The Metal Opera (2001)
- Avantasia – The Metal Opera Part II (2002)
- Avantasia – The Scarecrow (2008)
- Avantasia – The Mystery of Time (2013)
- Avantasia – Ghostlights (2016)
- Avatar – Feathers and Flesh (2016)
- Avatar – Avatar Country (2018)
- Avenged Sevenfold – The Stage (2016)
- Ayreon – The Final Experiment (1995)
- Ayreon – Into the Electric Castle (1998)
- Ayreon – Universal Migrator Part 1: The Dream Sequencer (2000)
- Ayreon – Universal Migrator Part 2: Flight of the Migrator (2000)
- Ayreon – The Human Equation (2004)
- Ayreon – 01011001 (2008)
- Ayreon – The Theory of Everything (2013)
- Ayreon – The Source (2017)
- Ayreon – Transitus (2020)

== B ==
- B'z – Friends (1992)
- B'z – Friends II (1996)
- B'z – Friends III (2021)
- Babymetal – Metal Galaxy (2019)
- Babymetal – The Other One (2023)
- The Band – The Band (1969)
- Barbra Streisand – Wet (1979)
- Bastille – Doom Days (2019)
- Bastille – Give Me the Future (2022)
- Bastille – "&" (2024)
- Bat for Lashes – The Bride (2016)
- Bathory – Blood on Ice (1996)
- The Beach Boys – Surfin' Safari (1962)
- The Beach Boys – Surfin' U.S.A. (1963)
- The Beach Boys – Surfer Girl (1963)
- The Beach Boys – Little Deuce Coupe (1963)
- The Beach Boys – Shut Down Volume 2 (1964)
- The Beach Boys – All Summer Long (1964)
- The Beach Boys – The Beach Boys Today! (1965)
- The Beach Boys – Pet Sounds (1966)
- The Beach Boys – Smile (1966–1967)
- The Beatles – Rubber Soul (1965)
- The Beatles – Revolver (1966)
- The Beatles – Sgt. Pepper's Lonely Hearts Club Band (1967)
- Bee Gees – Odessa (1969)
- Between the Buried and Me – Colors (2007)
- Between the Buried and Me – The Parallax: Hypersleep Dialogues (2011)
- Between the Buried and Me – The Parallax II: Future Sequence (2012)
- Between the Buried and Me – Coma Ecliptic (2015)
- Between the Buried and Me – Automata II (2018)
- Beyoncé – I Am... Sasha Fierce (2008)
- Beyoncé – Lemonade (2016)
- Big K.R.I.T. – Cadillactica (2014)
- Big K.R.I.T. – 4eva Is a Mighty Long Time (2017)
- Big Sean – I Decided (2017)
- Billy Idol – Cyberpunk (1993)
- Billy Joel – The Nylon Curtain (1982)
- Billy Joel – An Innocent Man (1983)
- Billy Woods and Kenny Segal – Maps (2023)
- Björk – Biophilia (2011)
- Björk – Vulnicura (2015)
- Black Country, New Road – Ants from Up There (2022)
- Black Veil Brides – Wretched and Divine: The Story of the Wild Ones (2013)
- Black Veil Brides – Vale (2018)
- Black Veil Brides – The Phantom Tomorrow (2021)
- Blackfield – Blackfield V (2017)
- Blind Guardian – Nightfall in Middle-Earth (1998)
- Blind Guardian – Legacy of the Dark Lands (2019)
- Blink-182 – Take Off Your Pants And Jacket (2001)
- Blink-182 – Blink-182 (2003)
- Blue Man Group – The Complex (2003)
- Blue October – Any Man in America (2010)
- Blue Öyster Cult – Imaginos (1988)
- Blues Traveler – Decisions of the Sky (2000)
- Blur – Modern Life is Rubbish (1993)
- Blur – Parklife (1994)
- Bob Johnson & Peter Knight - The King of Elfland’s Daughter (1977)
- Bobby Conn – Rise Up! (1998)
- Bomb the Music Industry! – Vacation (2011)
- Bon Iver – For Emma, Forever Ago (2007)
- Boublil & Schönberg – Les Misérables (1980)
- Boys Night Out – Trainwreck (2005)
- Brakence – Hypochondriac (2022)
- Brandon Flowers – Thrasher (2026)
- Brendon Small – Brendon Small's Galaktikon (2012)
- Brian Wilson – Smile (2004)
- Bring Me the Horizon – That's the Spirit (2015)
- Bring Me the Horizon – Amo (2019)
- Bring Me the Horizon – Post Human: Nex Gen (2024)
- Britney Spears – Britney Jean (2013)
- Brockhampton – The Family (2022)
- Bryan Scary and the Shredding Tears – Flight of the Knife (2008)
- BTS – Map of the Soul: 7 (2020)
- The Buggles – The Age of Plastic (1980)
- Burzum – Dauði Baldrs (1997)
- Burzum – Hliðskjálf (1999)

== C ==
- Camel – The Snow Goose (1975)
- Camel – Moonmadness (1976)
- Camel – Nude (1981)
- Camel – Stationary Traveller (1984)
- Camel – Harbour of Tears (1996)
- Camper Van Beethoven – New Roman Times (2004)
- Candy Claws – Ceres & Calypso in the Deep Time (2013)
- Caparezza – Le dimensioni del mio caos (2008)
- Caparezza – Il sogno eretico (2011)
- Caparezza – Museica (2014)
- Car Seat Headrest – Twin Fantasy (2011)
- Car Seat Headrest – Teens of Denial (2016)
- Car Seat Headrest – The Scholars (2025)
- Carach Angren – Lammendam (2008)
- Carach Angren – Death Came Through a Phantom Ship (2010)
- Carach Angren – Where the Corpses Sink Forever (2012)
- Carach Angren – This Is No Fairytale (2015)
- The Caretaker – An Empty Bliss Beyond This World (2011)
- The Caretaker – Everywhere at the End of Time (2016–2019)
- Cat System Corp. – News at 11 (2016)
- Catch 22 – Permanent Revolution (2006)
- Cherry Poppin' Daddies – Susquehanna (2008)
- Childish Gambino – Camp (2011)
- Childish Gambino – Because the Internet (2013)
- Childish Gambino – 3.15.20 (2020)
- Christine and the Queens – Redcar les adorables étoiles (prologue) (2022)
- Christine and the Queens – Paranoia, Angels, True Love (2023)
- Christopher Lee – Charlemagne: By the Sword and the Cross (2010)
- Christopher Lee – Charlemagne: The Omens of Death (2013)
- Chumbawamba – Pictures of Starving Children Sell Records (1986)
- Chvrches – Screen Violence (2021)
- Clairo – Sling (2021)
- Clipping. – Splendor & Misery (2016)
- CMX – Talvikuningas (2007)
- Coheed and Cambria – The Second Stage Turbine Blade (2002)
- Coheed and Cambria – In Keeping Secrets of Silent Earth: 3 (2003)
- Coheed and Cambria – Good Apollo, I'm Burning Star IV, Volume One: From Fear Through the Eyes of Madness (2005)
- Coheed and Cambria – Good Apollo, I'm Burning Star IV, Volume Two: No World for Tomorrow (2007)
- Coheed and Cambria – Year of the Black Rainbow (2010)
- Coheed and Cambria – The Afterman: Ascension (2012)
- Coheed and Cambria – The Afterman: Descension (2013)
- Coheed and Cambria – Vaxis – Act I: The Unheavenly Creatures (2018)
- Coheed and Cambria – Vaxis – Act II: A Window of the Waking Mind (2022)
- Coheed and Cambria – Vaxis – Act III: The Father of Make Believe (2025)
- Cold 187um – The Only Solution (2012)
- Coldplay – Mylo Xyloto (2011)
- Coldplay – Music of the Spheres (2021)
- Conan Gray – Found Heaven (2024)
- Conan Gray – Wishbone (2025)
- Cradle of Filth – Godspeed on the Devil's Thunder (2008)
- Cradle of Filth – Darkly, Darkly, Venus Aversa (2010)
- Creeper – Eternity, in Your Arms (2017)
- Cursive – Domestica (2000)
- Cursive – The Ugly Organ (2003)
- Cursive – Happy Hollow (2006)
- Cynic – Carbon-Based Anatomy (2011)

== D ==
- Daft Punk – Discovery (2001)
- Danger Doom – The Mouse and the Mask (2005)
- Daniel Liam Glyn – Changing Stations (2016)
- Daniel Liam Glyn – Nocturnes (2020)
- Dave – Psychodrama (2019)
- Dave Greenslade – Cactus Choir (1976)
- David Bowie – The Man Who Sold the World (1970)
- David Bowie – The Rise and Fall of Ziggy Stardust and the Spiders from Mars (1972)
- David Bowie – Diamond Dogs (1974)
- David Bowie – Outside (1995)
- David Bowie – Blackstar (2016)
- Deadlock – Manifesto (2008)
- The Dear Hunter – Act I: The Lake South, The River North (2006)
- The Dear Hunter – Act II: The Meaning of, and All Things Regarding Ms. Leading (2007)
- The Dear Hunter – Act III: Life and Death (2009)
- The Dear Hunter – The Color Spectrum (2011)
- The Dear Hunter – Act IV: Rebirth in Reprise (2015)
- The Dear Hunter – Act V: Hymns with the Devil in Confessional (2016)
- Death Cab for Cutie – Transatlanticism (2003)
- The Decemberists – The Crane Wife (2006)
- The Decemberists – The Hazards of Love (2009)
- Defeater – Lost Ground (2004)
- Defeater – Travels (2008)
- Defeater – Empty Days & Sleepless Nights (2011)
- Defeater – Letters Home (2013)
- Defeater – Abandoned (2015)
- Deftones – White Pony (2000)
- Deltron 3030 – Deltron 3030 (2000)
- Denzel Curry – TA13OO (2018)
- Denzel Curry – Melt My Eyez See Your Future (2022)
- Devin Townsend – Ziltoid the Omniscient (2007)
- Dexys – One Day I'm Going to Soar (2012)
- Die Ärzte – Le Frisur (1996)
- Dimmu Borgir – In Sorte Diaboli (2007)
- Dio – Magica (2000)
- Dionysos – La Mécanique du Cœur (2007)
- Dominici – O3: A Trilogy (2005)
- Donald Fagen – The Nightfly (1982)
- Donald Fagen – Kamakiriad (1993)
- Donna Summer – Four Seasons of Love (1976)
- Donna Summer – I Remember Yesterday (1977)
- Donna Summer – Once Upon a Time... (1977)
- Dorian Electra – My Agenda (2020)
- Dr. Octagon – Dr. Octagonecologyst (1996)
- Dragonland – Under the Grey Banner (2011)
- Dream Theater – Metropolis Pt. 2: Scenes from a Memory (1999)
- Dream Theater – Six Degrees of Inner Turbulence (2002)
- Dream Theater – Octavarium (2005)
- Dream Theater – The Astonishing (2016)
- Dredg – Leitmotif (1999)
- Dredg – El Cielo (2002)
- Drive-By Truckers – Southern Rock Opera (2001)
- Dropkick Murphys – Going Out in Style (2011)
- Duran Duran – Seven and the Ragged Tiger (1983)

== E ==
- Eagles – Desperado (1973)
- Eagles – Hotel California (1976)
- The Early November – The Mother, the Mechanic, and the Path (2006)
- Earth Crisis – Salvation of Innocents (2014)
- Ed Kuepper – Jean Lee and the Yellow Dog (2007)
- Edgar Winter – Mission Earth (1986)
- Edge of Sanity – Crimson (1996)
- Edge of Sanity – Crimson II (2003)
- Elbow – The Seldom Seen Kid (2008)
- Electric Light Orchestra – Eldorado (1974)
- Electric Light Orchestra – Time (1981)
- Elton John – Tumbleweed Connection (1970)
- Elton John – Captain Fantastic and the Brown Dirt Cowboy (1975)
- Eluveitie – Helvetios (2012)
- Elvis Costello – The Delivery Man (2004)
- Eminem – Relapse (2009)
- Eminem – The Death of Slim Shady (Coup de Grâce) (2024)
- Enigma – MCMXC a.D. (1990)
- Enigma – The Cross of Changes (1993)
- Enigma – The Fall of a Rebel Angel (2016)
- Epica – The Divine Conspiracy (2007)
- Erykah Badu – New Amerykah Part One (2008)
- Erykah Badu – New Amerykah Part Two (2010)
- Ethel Cain – Preacher's Daughter (2022)
- Ethel Cain – Willoughby Tucker, I'll Always Love You (2025)
- Evelyn Evelyn – Evelyn Evelyn (2010)
- Everclear – Songs from an American Movie Vol. One: Learning How to Smile (2000)
- Everclear – Songs from an American Movie Vol. Two: Good Time for a Bad Attitude (2000)
- Evergrey – In Search of Truth (2001)
- Evermore – Truth of the World: Welcome to the Show (2009)
- Extreme – Extreme II: Pornograffitti (1990)
- Extreme – III Sides to Every Story (1992)

== F ==
- Fabrizio De André – Tutti morimmo a stento (1968)
- Fabrizio De André – La buona novella (1970)
- Fabrizio De André – Non al denaro non all'amore né al cielo (1971)
- Fabrizio De André – Storia di un impiegato (1973)
- Fairport Convention – Babbacombe Lee (1971)
- Falling Up – Fangs! (2009)
- Fantômas – Suspended Animation (2005)
- Fates Warning – A Pleasant Shade of Gray (1997)
- Father John Misty – I Love You, Honeybear (2015)
- Father John Misty – Pure Comedy (2017)
- Father John Misty – God's Favorite Customer (2018)
- Fear Factory – Soul of a New Machine (1992)
- Fear Factory – Demanufacture (1995)
- Fear Factory – Obsolete (1998)
- Fear Factory – Digimortal (2001)
- Fear Factory – The Industrialist (2012)
- Fear Factory – Genexus (2015)
- Fields of the Nephilim – Elizium (1990)
- Fields of the Nephilim – Mourning Sun (2005)
- The Fiery Furnaces – Blueberry Boat (2004)
- The Fiery Furnaces – Rehearsing My Choir (2005)
- The Flaming Lips – In a Priest Driven Ambulance (1990)
- The Flaming Lips – Yoshimi Battles The Pink Robots (2002)
- The Flaming Lips – King's Mouth (2019)
- The Flaming Lips – American Head (2020)
- Flaming Youth – Ark 2 (1969)
- Flower Travellin' Band – Satori (1971)
- FM Static – Dear Diary (2009)
- Fontaines DC - Romance (2024)
- Foster the People – Supermodel (2014)
- Foxygen – ...And Star Power (2014)
- Frank Ocean – Channel Orange (2012)
- Frank Ocean – Blonde (2016)
- Frank Sinatra – The Voice of Frank Sinatra (1946)
- Frank Sinatra – Songs for Young Lovers (1954)
- Frank Sinatra – Swing Easy! (1954)
- Frank Sinatra – In the Wee Small Hours (1955)
- Frank Sinatra – Songs for Swingin' Lovers! (1956)
- Frank Sinatra – Where Are You? (1957)
- Frank Sinatra – Come Fly with Me (1958)
- Frank Sinatra – Frank Sinatra Sings for Only the Lonely (1958)
- Frank Sinatra – Come Dance with Me! (1959)
- Frank Sinatra – No One Cares (1959)
- Frank Zappa and The Mothers of Invention – Freak Out! (1966)
- Frank Zappa and The Mothers of Invention – We're Only in It for the Money (1968)
- Frank Zappa - Lumpy Gravy (1968)
- Frank Zappa - 200 Motels (1971)
- Frank Zappa – Joe's Garage (1979)
- Frank Zappa – Thing-Fish (1984)
- Frank Zappa - Frank Zappa Meets the Mothers of Prevention (1985)
- Frank Zappa - Civilization Phaze III (1994)
- Frank Zappa - Läther (1996)
- Franz Ferdinand – Tonight (2009)
- Fucked Up – David Comes to Life (2011)
- Fugees – The Score (1996)
- Funeral for a Friend – Tales Don't Tell Themselves (2007)

== G ==
- Gallows – Grey Britain (2009)
- The Game – Jesus Piece (2012)
- Gatsbys American Dream – Ribbons and Sugar (2003)
- Genesis – From Genesis to Revelation (1969)
- Genesis – The Lamb Lies Down on Broadway (1974)
- Gentle Giant – Three Friends (1972)
- Gentle Giant – The Power and the Glory (1974)
- Gentle Giant – Interview (1976)
- The Gentle Storm – The Diary (2015)
- Ghostface Killah – Twelve Reasons to Die (2013)
- Ghostface Killah – 36 Seasons (2014)
- Girls Aloud – Chemistry (2005)
- Glass Animals – Zaba (2014)
- Glass Animals – How to Be a Human Being (2016)
- Glass Animals – Dreamland (2020)
- God Forbid – IV: Constitution of Treason (2005)
- Godspeed You! Black Emperor – Lift Your Skinny Fists Like Antennas to Heaven (2000)
- Gojira – From Mars to Sirius (2005)
- Goldfrapp – Tales of Us (2013)
- The Good Life – Album of the Year (2004)
- The Good, the Bad & the Queen – The Good, the Bad & the Queen (2007)
- The Good, the Bad & the Queen – Merrie Land (2018)
- Gorillaz – Demon Days (2005)
- Gorillaz – Plastic Beach (2010)
- Gorillaz – Humanz (2017)
- Gorillaz – Cracker Island (2023)
- Graham Coxon – The Spinning Top (2009)
- Grandaddy – The Sophtware Slump (2000)
- Green Carnation – Light of Day, Day of Darkness (2001)
- Green Day – American Idiot (2004)
- Green Day – 21st Century Breakdown (2009)
- Grimes – Geidi Primes (2010)
- Grimes – Miss Anthropocene (2020)

== H ==
- Haken – Aquarius (2010)
- Haken – Visions (2011)
- Halsey – Badlands (2015)
- Halsey – Hopeless Fountain Kingdom (2017)
- Halsey – If I Can’t Have Love, I Want Power (2021)
- Halsey – The Great Impersonator (2024)
- Happy End – Kazemachi Roman (1971)
- Harmonium – Les cinq saisons (1975)
- Harmonium – L'heptade (1976)
- Hawkwind – The Machine Stops (2016)
- Hawthorne Heights – Zero (2013)
- The Head and the Heart – The Head and the Heart (2011)
- Helloween – Keeper of the Seven Keys: Part I (1987)
- Helloween – Keeper of the Seven Keys: Part II (1988)
- Herbie Hancock – Maiden Voyage (1965)
- The Hold Steady – Separation Sunday (2005)
- Homy Hogs - Werewolves on Wheels vs. Everything that Moves (1988)
- Hooverphonic – Hooverphonic Presents Jackie Cane (2002)
- Horslips – The Táin (1976)
- House of Heroes – The End Is Not the End (2008)
- Hüsker Dü – Zen Arcade (1984)

== I ==
- Ice Cube – Death Certificate (1991)
- Iced Earth – Night of the Stormrider (1991)
- Iced Earth – The Dark Saga (1996)
- Iced Earth – Horror Show (2001)
- Iced Earth – The Glorious Burden (2004)
- Iced Earth – Framing Armageddon: Something Wicked Part 1 (2007)
- Iced Earth – The Crucible of Man: Something Wicked Part 2 (2008)
- Insomnium – Winter's Gate (2016)
- IQ – Subterranea (1997)
- Iron Maiden – Seventh Son of a Seventh Son (1988)

== J ==
- J Balvin – Colores (2020)
- J. Cole – 2014 Forest Hills Drive (2014)
- J. Cole – 4 Your Eyez Only (2016)
- Jack's Mannequin – Everything in Transit (2005)
- Jackson Browne – Running On Empty (1977)
- Jane Remover – Census Designated (2023)
- Janet Jackson – Control (1986)
- Janet Jackson – Janet Jackson's Rhythm Nation 1814 (1989)
- Janet Jackson – The Velvet Rope (1997)
- Janelle Monáe – Metropolis: Suite I (The Chase) (2007)
- Janelle Monáe – The ArchAndroid (2010)
- Janelle Monáe – The Electric Lady (2013)
- Janelle Monáe – Dirty Computer (2018)
- Jazmine Sullivan – Heaux Tales (2021)
- Jay-Z – American Gangster (2007)
- Jeff Wayne – Jeff Wayne's Musical Version of The War of the Worlds (1978)
- Jethro Tull – Thick as a Brick (1972)
- Jethro Tull – A Passion Play (1973)
- Jethro Tull – Too Old to Rock and Roll, Too Young to Die (1975)
- Jethro Tull – Songs from the Wood (1977)
- Jhene Aiko – Trip (2017)
- Joe Jackson – Blaze of Glory (1989)
- John Coltrane – A Love Supreme (1965)
- John Linnell – State Songs (1999)
- John Moran – The Manson Family: An Opera (1992)
- Johnny Cash – Songs of Our Soil (1959)
- Johnny Cash – Ride This Train (1960)
- Johnny Cash – All Aboard the Blue Train (1962)
- Johnny Cash – Bitter Tears (1964)
- Johnny Cash – From Sea to Shining Sea (1968)
- Johnny Cash – America: A 200-Year Salute in Story and Song (1972)
- Johnny Cash – The Rambler (1977)
- Jon Anderson – Olias of Sunhillow (1976)
- Jonathan Coulton – Solid State (2017)
- Joni Mitchell – Song to a Seagull (1968)
- Joni Mitchell – Both Sides Now (2000)
- Judas Priest – Nostradamus (2008)
- Judy Garland – The Letter (1959)

== K ==
- Kamelot – Epica (2003)
- Kamelot – The Black Halo (2005)
- Kamelot – Silverthorn (2012)
- Kamelot – The Shadow Theory (2018)
- Kanye West – The College Dropout (2004)
- Kanye West – Graduation (2007)
- Kanye West – 808s & Heartbreak (2008)
- Kanye West – My Beautiful Dark Twisted Fantasy (2010)
- Kanye West – Yeezus (2013)
- Kanye West – The Life of Pablo (2016)
- Kanye West – Ye (2018)
- Kanye West – Donda (2021)
- Kate Bush – Hounds of Love (1985)
- Kate Bush – Aerial (2005)
- Kate Bush – 50 Words For Snow (2011)
- Kayo Dot – Coyote (2010)
- Kekal – The Habit of Fire (2007)
- Kelly Clarkson – Piece By Piece (2015)
- Kendrick Lamar – Section.80 (2011)
- Kendrick Lamar – Good Kid, M.A.A.D City (2012)
- Kendrick Lamar – To Pimp a Butterfly (2015)
- Kendrick Lamar – Damn (2017)
- Kendrick Lamar – Mr. Morale & the Big Steppers (2022)
- Kenny Rogers – Gideon (1980)
- Kenny Rogers & The First Edition – The Ballad of Calico (1972)Billboard
- Kid Cudi – Man on the Moon: The End of Day (2009)
- Kid Cudi – Man on the Moon II: The Legend of Mr. Rager (2010)
- Kid Cudi – Man on the Moon III: The Chosen (2020)
- Kid Creole and the Coconuts – Fresh Fruit in Foreign Places (1981)
- The Killers — Pressure Machine (2021)
- King Crimson – In the Court of the Crimson King (1969)
- King Crimson - Beat (1982)
- King Diamond – Abigail (1987)
- King Diamond – "Them" (1988)
- King Geedorah – Take Me To Your Leader (2003)
- King Gizzard and the Lizard Wizard – Eyes Like the Sky (2013)
- King Gizzard and the Lizard Wizard – I'm in Your Mind Fuzz (2014)
- King Gizzard and the Lizard Wizard – Quarters! (2015)
- King Gizzard and the Lizard Wizard – Paper Mâché Dream Balloon (2015)
- King Gizzard and the Lizard Wizard – Nonagon Infinity (2016)
- King Gizzard and the Lizard Wizard – Flying Microtonal Banana (2017)
- King Gizzard and the Lizard Wizard – Murder of the Universe (2017)
- King Gizzard and the Lizard Wizard – Fishing For Fishies (2019)
- King Gizzard and the Lizard Wizard – Infest the Rat's Nest (2019)
- King Gizzard and the Lizard Wizard – K.G. (2020)
- King Gizzard and the Lizard Wizard – L.W. (2021)
- King Gizzard and the Lizard Wizard – PetroDragonic Apocalypse; or, Dawn of Eternal Night: An Annihilation of Planet Earth and the Beginning of Merciless Damnation (2023)
- King's X – Gretchen Goes to Nebraska (1989)
- The Kinks – Face to Face (1966)
- The Kinks – The Kinks Are the Village Green Preservation Society (1968)
- The Kinks – Arthur (Or the Decline and Fall of the British Empire) (1969)
- The Kinks – Lola Versus Powerman and the Moneygoround, Part One (1970)
- The Kinks – Preservation Act 1 (1973)
- The Kinks – Preservation Act 2 (1974)
- Kiss – Music from "The Elder" (1981)
- Klaatu – Hope (1977)
- The KLF – Chill Out (1990)
- Kraftwerk – Autobahn (1974)
- Kraftwerk – Radio-Activity (1975)
- Kraftwerk – Trans-Europe Express (1977)
- Kraftwerk – The Man-Machine (1978)

== L ==
- Lady Gaga – Harlequin (2024)
- Lana Del Rey – Ultraviolence (2014)
- Laura Marling – Once I Was an Eagle (2013)
- Lauryn Hill – The Miseducation of Lauryn Hill (1998)
- Leaves' Eyes – Vinland Saga (2005)
- Lift to Experience – The Texas-Jerusalem Crossroads (2001)
- Lil Yachty – Lil Boat (2016)
- Lily Allen – West End Girl (2025)
- Linkin Park – A Thousand Suns (2010)
- Lisa - Alter Ego (2025)
- Little Brother – The Minstrel Show (2003)
- Liz Phair – Exile in Guyville (1993)
- Loathe – The Cold Sun (2017)
- Local H – As Good as Dead (1996)
- Local H – Pack Up the Cats (1998)
- Lights – Skin & Earth (2017)
- Logic – The Incredible True Story (2015)
- Logic – Everybody (2017)
- Loïc Nottet – Selfocracy (2017)
- Lord Huron – Strange Trails (2015)
- Lord Huron – Vide Noir (2018)
- Lorde – Melodrama (2017)
- Lorna Shore – Pain Remains (2022)
- A Lot Like Birds – No Place (2013)
- Lou Reed – Berlin (1973)
- Lou Reed – New York (1989)
- Lou Reed – Magic and Loss (1992)
- Lou Reed – The Raven (2003)
- Lou Reed & Metallica – Lulu (2011)
- Ludo – Broken Bride (2005)
- Lupe Fiasco – Lupe Fiasco's The Cool (2007)
- Lupe Fiasco – Drogas Wave (2018)

== M ==
- Macabre – Dahmer (2000)
- Mac Miller – Swimming (2018)
- Mac Miller – Circles (2020)
- Madness – The Rise & Fall (1982)
- Madonna – Like a Prayer (1989)
- Madonna – Erotica (1992)
- Madonna – American Life (2003)
- Magdalena Bay - Imaginal Disk (2024)
- The Magnetic Fields – 69 Love Songs (1990)
- The Magnetic Fields – 50 Song Memoir (2017)
- Mägo de Oz – Finisterra (2000)
- Mägo de Oz – Gaia (2003)
- Mägo de Oz – Gaia II: La Voz Dormida (2005)
- Mägo de Oz – Gaia III: Atlantia (2010)
- Mai Kuraki – Kimi Omou: Shunkashūtō (2018)
- Makaveli — The Don Killuminati: The 7 Day Theory (1996)
- Make Them Suffer - Old Souls (2015)
- Make Them Suffer - Worlds Apart (2017)
- Manfred Mann's Earth Band – Solar Fire (1973)
- Manowar – Gods of War (2007)
- Mariah Carey – Me. I Am Mariah... The Elusive Chanteuse (2014)
- Marianas Trench – Masterpiece Theatre (2009)
- Marianas Trench – Ever After (2011)
- Marianas Trench – Astoria (2015)
- Marianas Trench – Phantoms (2019)
- Marillion – Misplaced Childhood (1985)
- Marillion – Clutching at Straws (1987)
- Marillion – Brave (1994)
- Marilyn Manson – Antichrist Superstar (1996)
- Marilyn Manson – Mechanical Animals (1998)
- Marilyn Manson – Holy Wood (2000)
- Marilyn Manson – Born Villain (2012)
- Marilyn Manson – We Are Chaos (2020)
- Marina and the Diamonds – Electra Heart (2012)
- The Mars Volta – De-Loused in the Comatorium (2003)
- The Mars Volta – Frances the Mute (2005)
- The Mars Volta – The Bedlam in Goliath (2008)
- Marty Robbins – Gunfighter Ballads and Trail Songs (1959)
- Marty Robbins – More Gunfighter Ballads and Trail Songs (1960)
- Marvin Gaye – What's Going On (1971)
- Marvin Gaye – Here, My Dear (1978)
- Masayoshi Takanaka - The Rainbow Goblins (1981)
- Masta Ace – Disposable Arts (2001)
- Masta Ace – A Long Hot Summer (2004)
- Mastodon – Leviathan (2004)
- Mastodon – Blood Mountain (2006)
- Mastodon – Crack the Skye (2009)
- Mastodon – Emperor of Sand (2017)
- Matthew Good – Vancouver (2009)
- Maxwell – Maxwell's Urban Hang Suite (1996)
- Mayhem – A Grand Declaration of War (2000)
- Meat Loaf – Welcome To The Neighborhood (1995)
- Melanie Martinez – Cry Baby (2015)
- Melanie Martinez – K–12 (2019)
- Melanie Martinez – Portals (2023)
- Melanie Martinez – Hades (2026)
- Men Without Hats – Pop Goes the World (1987)
- Merle Travis – Folk Songs of the Hills (1946)
- Meshuggah – Catch Thirtythree (2005)
- Metallica – Master of Puppets (1986)
- MF Doom – Mm..Food (2004)
- MF Grimm – The Hunt for the Gingerbread Man (2007)
- Michael Franti and Spearhead – Stay Human (2001)
- Midnight Oil – Diesel and Dust (1987)
- Mike Oldfield – Tubular Bells (1973)
- Mike Oldfield – The Songs of Distant Earth (1994)
- Mike Shinoda – Post Traumatic (2018)
- Mild High Club – Skiptracing (2016)
- Millie Jackson – Caught Up (1974)
- The Miracles – City of Angels (1975)
- Miranda Lambert – The Weight of These Wings (2016)
- Miranda Lambert – Palomino (2022)
- The Moody Blues – Days of Future Passed (1967)
- The Moody Blues – In Search of the Lost Chord (1968)
- The Moody Blues – To Our Children's Children's Children (1969)
- Mother Mother – The Sticks (2012)
- Mother Mother - Inside (2021)
- Mount Eerie – A Crow Looked at Me (2017)
- The Mountain Goats – Tallahassee (2002)
- The Mountain Goats – The Sunset Tree (2005)
- The Mountain Goats – Beat the Champ (2015)
- The Mountain Goats – Goths (2017)
- Mr. Lif – Emergency Rations (2002)
- Mr. Lif – I Phantom (2002)
- MSA Project – Istree (2010)
- Murder by Death – Who Will Survive, and What Will Be Left of Them? (2003)
- Muse – Black Holes and Revelations (2006)
- Muse – The Resistance (2009)
- Muse – Drones (2015)
- My Chemical Romance – Three Cheers for Sweet Revenge (2004)
- My Chemical Romance – The Black Parade (2006)
- My Chemical Romance – Danger Days: The True Lives of the Fabulous Killjoys (2010)

== N ==
- Nat King Cole – Wild Is Love (1960)
- Natalia Kills – Perfectionist (2011)
- Neal Morse – Testimony (2003)
- Neal Morse – Sola Scriptura (2007)
- Neal Morse – Testimony 2 (2011)
- Nektar – Journey to the Centre of the Eye (1971)
- Neil Young – Greendale (2003)
- Neil Young – Fork in the Road (2009)
- Nelson – Imaginator (1996)
- Neon Neon – Stainless Style (2008)
- Nero – Welcome Reality (2011)
- Neutral Milk Hotel – In the Aeroplane Over the Sea (1998)
- Nevermore – Dreaming Neon Black (1999)
- NF – Mansion (2015)
- NF – Therapy Session (2016)
- NF – Perception (2017)
- NF – The Search (2019)
- NF – HOPE (2023)
- The Nice – Five Bridges (1970)
- Nick Cave and the Bad Seeds – Murder Ballads (1996)
- Nick Cave and the Bad Seeds – Ghosteen (2019)
- Nightwish – Imaginaerum (2011)
- Nightwish – Endless Forms Most Beautiful (2015)
- Nine Inch Nails – The Downward Spiral (1994)
- Nine Inch Nails – The Fragile (1999)
- Nine Inch Nails – Year Zero (2007)
- Nirvana (UK) – The Story of Simon Simopath (1967)
- Nocturnus – The Key (1990)
- Nothing but Thieves – Dead Club City (2023)

== O ==
- Oasis – Definitely Maybe (1994)
- Oasis – (What's the Story) Morning Glory? (1995)
- The Ocean – Heliocentric (2010)
- The Ocean – Anthropocentric (2010)
- The Ocean – Pelagial (2013)
- The Ocean – Phanerozoic I: Palaeozoic (2018)
- The Ocean – Phanerozoic II: Mesozoic / Cenozoic (2020)
- Olivia Rodrigo – You Seem Pretty Sad for a Girl So in Love (2026)
- Of Montreal – The Bird Who Continues to Eat the Rabbit's Flower (1999)
- Opeth – My Arms, Your Hearse (1998)
- Opeth – Still Life (1999)
- Opeth – The Last Will and Testament (2024)
- Orphaned Land – El Norra Alila (1996)
- Orphaned Land – Mabool (2004)
- Orphaned Land – The Never Ending Way of ORWarriOR (2010)
- Orphaned Land – Unsung Prophets and Dead Messiahs (2018)
- Orchestral Manoeuvres in the Dark – Dazzle Ships (1983)
- Osmonds – The Plan (1973)
- Our Lady Peace – Spiritual Machines (2000)
- Outkast – Speakerboxxx/The Love Below (2003)
- Owen Pallett – Heartland (2010)
- Owl City – Cinematic (2018)

== P ==
- Pain of Salvation – Remedy Lane (2002)
- Pain of Salvation – In the Passing Light of Day (2017)
- Pallas – The Sentinel (1984)
- Pandora's Box – Original Sin (1989)
- Panic! at the Disco – Death of a Bachelor (2016)
- Paradox – Heresy (1989)
- Parkway Drive – Deep Blue (2010)
- Parliament – Chocolate City (1975)
- Parliament – Mothership Connection (1975)
- Parliament – The Clones of Dr. Funkenstein (1976)
- Parliament – Funkentelechy Vs. the Placebo Syndrome (1977)
- Parliament – Motor Booty Affair (1978)
- Parliament – Gloryhallastoopid (1979)
- Parliament – Trombipulation (1980)
- Paul Kantner/Jefferson Starship – Blows Against The Empire (1970)
- Paul McCartney – Egypt Station (2018)
- Pedro the Lion – Winners Never Quit (2000)
- Pedro the Lion – Control (2002)
- Pepe Deluxé – Queen of the Wave (2012)
- A Perfect Circle – Thirteenth Step (2003)
- A Perfect Circle – Emotive (2004)
- Periphery – Juggernaut: Alpha (2015)
- Periphery – Juggernaut: Omega (2015)
- Pescado Rabioso – Artaud (1973)
- Pete Townshend – White City: A Novel (1985)
- Pharoahe Monch – PTSD (2014)
- Phylicia Rashad – Josephine Superstar (1978)
- Phish – Rift (1993)
- Pink Floyd – The Dark Side of the Moon (1973)
- Pink Floyd – Wish You Were Here (1975)
- Pink Floyd – Animals (1977)
- Pink Floyd – The Wall (1979)
- Pink Floyd – The Final Cut (1983)
- Pink Floyd – The Division Bell (1994)
- Plan B – The Defamation of Strickland Banks (2010)
- Planet P Project – Pink World (1993)
- The Plot in You - First Born (2011)
- P.O.D. – The Awakening (2015)
- Poe – Haunted (2000)
- Pond – The Weather (2017)
- Porcupine Tree – Voyage 34 (2000)
- Porcupine Tree – Fear of a Blank Planet (2007)
- Porcupine Tree – The Incident (2009)
- The Pretty Things – S.F. Sorrow (1968)
- Primus – Primus & the Chocolate Factory with the Fungi Ensemble (2014)
- Primus – The Desaturating Seven (2017)
- Prince – Love Symbol Album (1992)
- Prince – Art Official Age (2014)
- Prince & The Revolution – Purple Rain (1984)
- Prince Paul – A Prince Among Thieves (1999)
- The Prize Fighter Inferno – My Brother's Blood Machine (2006)
- Protest the Hero – Kezia (2005)
- The Protomen – The Protomen (2005)
- The Protomen – Act II: The Father of Death (2009)
- Prototype – Catalyst (2012)
- Public Enemy – Fear of a Black Planet (1990)
- Public Service Broadcasting – The Race for Space (2015)
- Public Service Broadcasting – Every Valley (2017)
- Punch Brothers – The Phosphorescent Blues (2015)
- Pyramaze – Legend of the Bone Carver (2006)

== Q ==
- Quadeca – I Didn't Mean to Haunt You (2022)
- Quadeca – Vanisher, Horizon Scraper (2025)
- Queensrÿche – Operation: Mindcrime (1988)
- Queensrÿche – Operation: Mindcrime II (2006)
- Queensrÿche – American Soldier (2009)
- Queens of the Stone Age – Songs for the Deaf (2002)

== R ==
- R. Kelly – Trapped in the Closet (2005)
- Radiohead – Kid A (2000)
- Raekwon – Only Built 4 Cuban Linx... (1995)
- Raekwon – Only Built 4 Cuban Linx... Pt. II (2009)
- Raffi – Raffi Radio (1995)
- Randy Newman – Good Old Boys (1974)
- Randy Newman – Randy Newman's Faust (1995)
- Raphael Saadiq – Jimmy Lee (2019)
- Rasputina – Oh Perilous World! (2007)
- Raveena – Asha's Awakening (2022)
- Ray Charles – The Genius Hits the Road (1960)
- Raye – This Music May Contain Hope (2026)
- The Receiving End of Sirens – The Earth Sings Mi Fa Mi (2007)
- Renaissance – Scheherazade and Other Stories (1975)
- Return To Forever – Romantic Warrior (1976)
- Rhapsody – Legendary Tales (1997)
- Rhapsody – Symphony of Enchanted Lands (1998)
- Rhapsody – Dawn of Victory (2000)
- Rhapsody – Rain of a Thousand Flames (2001)
- Rhapsody – Power of the Dragonflame (2002)
- Rhapsody – Symphony of Enchanted Lands II: The Dark Secret (2004)
- Rhapsody of Fire – Triumph or Agony (2006)
- Rhapsody of Fire – The Frozen Tears of Angels (2010)
- Rhapsody of Fire – From Chaos to Eternity (2011)
- Rich Mullins – A Liturgy, a Legacy, & a Ragamuffin Band (1993)
- Rick Wakeman – The Six Wives of Henry VIII (1973)
- Right Away, Great Captain – The Bitter End (2006)
- Right Away, Great Captain – The Eventually Home (2008)
- Right Away, Great Captain – The Church of the Good Thief (2012)
- Rising Appalachia – The Lost Mystique of Being in the Know (2021)
- Riverside – Love, Fear and the Time Machine (2015)
- Robin Thicke – Paula (2014)
- Roger Waters – The Pros and Cons of Hitch Hiking (1984)
- Roger Waters – Radio K.A.O.S. (1987)
- Roger Waters – Amused to Death (1992)
- Roger Waters – Is This the Life We Really Want? (2017)
- The Roots – Undun (2011)
- The Roots – ...And Then You Shoot Your Cousin (2014)
- Rosalía – Los ángeles (2017)
- Rosalía – El mal querer (2018)
- Rosalía – Motomami (2022)
- Rosanne Cash – The River & the Thread (2014)
- Royal Hunt – The Mission (2001)
- Rush – Clockwork Angels (2012)
- RZA – Bobby Digital in Stereo (1998)

== S ==
- Sabaton – The Art of War (2008)
- Sabaton – Carolus Rex (2012)
- Sabaton – Heroes (2014)
- Sabaton – The Last Stand (2016)
- Sabaton – The Great War (2019)
- Sabaton – The War to End All Wars (2022)
- Sabbat – Dreamweaver (Reflections of Our Yesterdays) (1989)
- Saga – The Chapters Live (2005)
- Saga – Generation 13 (1995)
- Sarah Brightman – Dive (1993)
- Savatage – Streets: A Rock Opera (1991)
- Say Anything – In Defense of the Genre (2007)
- Scorpions – Humanity: Hour I (2007)
- Sepultura – Roots (1996)
- Sepultura – Dante XXI (2006)
- Sepultura – A-Lex (2009)
- Sepultura – Kairos (2011)
- Serge Gainsbourg – Histoire de Melody Nelson (1971)
- Serge Gainsbourg – Rock Around the Bunker (1975)
- Serge Gainsbourg – L'Homme à tête de chou (1976)
- Senses Fail – Still Searching (2006)
- Seventh Wonder – Mercy Falls (2008)
- Sex Pistols - The Great Rock 'n' Roll Swindle (1979)
- Shadow Gallery – Room V (2005)
- Shinedown – Attention Attention (2018)
- Shinedown – Planet Zero (2022)
- Showbread – Anorexia (2008)
- Showbread – Nervosa (2008)
- Silverstein – A Shipwreck in the Sand (2009)
- Silverstein – This Is How the Wind Shifts (2013)
- Silverstein – I Am Alive in Everything I Touch (2015)
- Simon & Garfunkel – Bookends (1968)
- Sixx:A.M. – The Heroin Diaries Soundtrack (2007)
- Sly and the Family Stone – There's a Riot Goin' On (1971)
- The Smashing Pumpkins – Mellon Collie and the Infinite Sadness (1995)
- The Smashing Pumpkins – Machina/The Machines of God (2000)
- The Smashing Pumpkins – Machina II/The Friends & Enemies of Modern Music (2000)
- The Smashing Pumpkins – Teargarden by Kaleidyscope (2009–2014)
- The Smashing Pumpkins – Oceania (2012)
- Solefald – Pills against the Ageless Ills (2001)
- Solefald – An Icelandic Odyssey (2005–2006)
- Spacemen 3 – The Perfect Prescription (1987)
- Spock's Beard – Snow (2002)
- Starset – Transmissions (2014)
- Stephen Sanchez — Angel Face (2023)
- Steven Wilson – The Raven That Refused to Sing (And Other Stories) (2013)
- Steven Wilson – Hand. Cannot. Erase. (2015)
- Sticky Fingaz – Black Trash: The Autobiography of Kirk Jones (2001)
- Stone Sour – House of Gold & Bones – Part 1 (2013)
- Stone Sour – House of Gold & Bones – Part 2 (2013)
- Stratovarius – Visions (1997)
- The Streets – A Grand Don't Come for Free (2004)
- Styx – The Grand Illusion (1977)
- Styx – Paradise Theatre (1981)
- Styx – Kilroy Was Here (1983)
- Styx - The Mission (2017)
- Suede – Night Thoughts (2016)
- Sufjan Stevens – Michigan (2003)
- Sufjan Stevens – Seven Swans (2004)
- Sufjan Stevens – Illinois (2005)
- Sufjan Stevens – Carrie & Lowell (2015)
- Sufjan Stevens – A Beginner's Mind (2021)
- Super Furry Animals – Hey Venus! (2007)
- Swans – Soundtracks for the Blind (1996)
- Symphony X – V: The New Mythology Suite (2000)
- Symphony X – Paradise Lost (2007)
- Symphony X – Iconoclast (2011)
- System of a Down – Mezmerize (2005)
- System of a Down – Hypnotize (2005)
- SZA – Ctrl (2017)

== T ==
- Talking Heads – Fear of Music (1979)
- Talking Heads – Naked (1988)
- Tally Hall – Good & Evil (2011)
- Tandy & Morgan – Earthrise (1985)
- Taproot – The Episodes (2012)
- Taylor Swift – Speak Now (2010)
- Taylor Swift – Reputation (2017)
- Taylor Swift – Folklore (2020)
- Taylor Swift – Evermore (2020)
- Taylor Swift – Midnights (2022)
- Taylor Swift – The Tortured Poets Department (2024)
- Tears for Fears – The Hurting (1983)
- Thrice – The Alchemy Index (2007–2008)
- Thirty Seconds to Mars – 30 Seconds to Mars (2002)
- Thirty Seconds to Mars – This Is War (2009)
- Thirty Seconds to Mars – Love, Lust, Faith and Dreams (2013)
- T.I. – T.I. vs. T.I.P. (2007)
- Toni Braxton & Babyface – Love, Marriage & Divorce (2014)
- Tool – Lateralus (2001)
- Tori Amos – Strange Little Girls (2001)
- Tori Amos – Scarlet's Walk (2002)
- Tori Amos – American Doll Posse (2007)
- Tori Amos – Night of Hunters (2011)
- Trazendo a Arca – Salmos e Cânticos Espirituais (2009)
- Trivium – In the Court of the Dragon (2021)
- The Tubes – The Completion Backward Principle (1981)
- Twenty One Pilots – Blurryface (2015)
- Twenty One Pilots – Trench (2018)
- Twenty One Pilots – Scaled and Icy (2021)
- Twenty One Pilots – Clancy (2024)
- Twenty One Pilots – Breach (2025)
- Tyler, the Creator – Bastard (2009)
- Tyler, the Creator – Goblin (2011)
- Tyler, the Creator – Wolf (2013)
- Tyler, the Creator - Flower Boy (2017)
- Tyler, the Creator – Igor (2019)
- Tyler, the Creator - Chromakopia (2024)

== U ==
- Ulver – Nattens madrigal (1997)
- Underscores – Wallsocket (2023)
- Unleash the Archers – Apex (2017)
- Unleash the Archers – Abyss (2020)
- Urge Overkill – Exit the Dragon (1995)
- Usher – Confessions (2004)
- Utopia – Deface the Music (1980)

== V ==
- The Vaccines – Back in Love City (2021)
- Vektor – Terminal Redux (2016)
- Venom – At War with Satan (1984)
- Vendetta Red – Sisters of the Red Death (2005)
- Viktor Vaughn – Vaudeville Villain (2003)
- Vision Eternel – Echoes from Forgotten Hearts (2015)
- Vision Eternel – For Farewell of Nostalgia (2020)
- Voivod – The Wake (2018)
- Volbeat – Outlaw Gentlemen & Shady Ladies (2013)

== W ==
- W.A.S.P. – The Crimson Idol (1992)
- The Weeknd – After Hours (2020)
- The Weeknd – Dawn FM (2022)
- The Weeknd – Hurry Up Tomorrow (2025)
- Ween – The Mollusk (1997)
- Weezer – Pinkerton (1996)
- Weezer – Weezer (White Album) (2016)
- Willie Nelson – Yesterday's Wine (1971)
- Willie Nelson – Shotgun Willie (1973)
- Willie Nelson – Phases and Stages (1974)
- Willie Nelson – Red Headed Stranger (1975)
- Will Wood – The Normal Album (2020)
- Will Wood and the Tapeworms – Self-ish (2016)
- Within Temptation – The Unforgiving (2011)
- Whitechapel – The Somatic Defilement (2007)
- Whitechapel – The Valley (2019)
- Whitechapel – Kin (2021)
- The Who – The Who Sell Out (1967)
- The Who – Tommy (1969)
- The Who – Quadrophenia (1973)
- The Wonder Years – No Closer to Heaven (2015)
- Woody Guthrie – Dust Bowl Ballads (1940)
- Wyclef Jean – Wyclef Jean Presents The Carnival (1997)

== X ==
- XTC – Skylarking (1986)
- Xzibit – Man vs. Machine (2002)

== Y ==
- Yes – Tales from Topographic Oceans (1973)
- Yoko Ono – Starpeace (1985)

== See also ==
- Lists of albums
