= Mike Watts (music producer) =

American audio engineer and producer

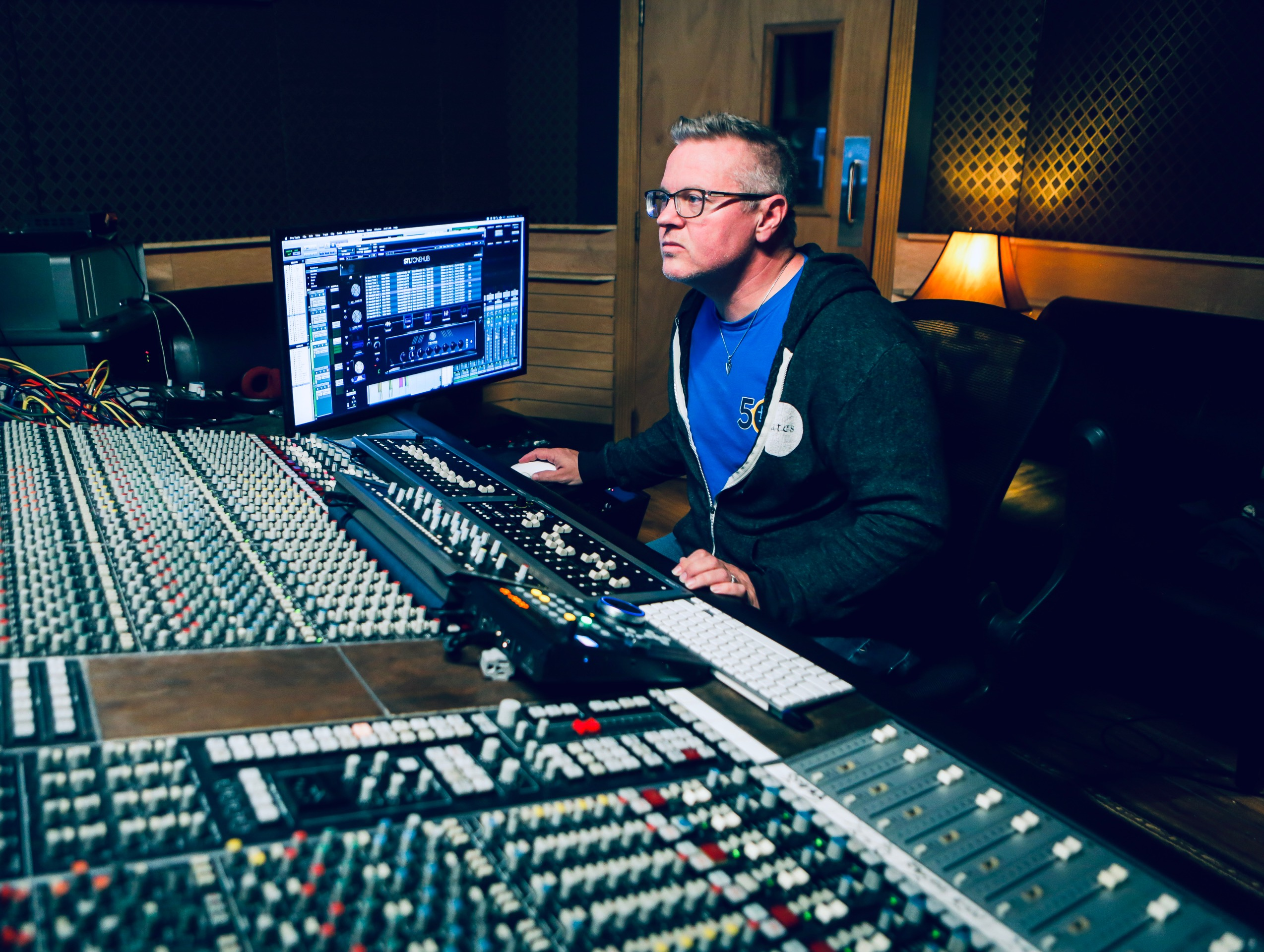

Background information
- Origin: New York, United States
- Genres: Alternative rock, post hardcore, progressive rock, progressive metal, indie rock
- Occupations: Mixing engineer, Record producer, Audio engineering
- Years active: 2002–present
- Website: mikewattsproducer.com

Mike Watts is an American audio engineer, mixer, and record producer, who has worked with a variety of artists including The Dillinger Escape Plan, Glassjaw, As Cities Burn, Hopesfall, As Tall As Lions, The Dear Hunter, and Gates. Watts has owned and operates VuDu Studios in Long Island, New York. for past 23 years. He graduated from the Aaron Copeland School of Music, majoring in percussion and music business. Watts opened VuDu Studios in 1997 which started as a small one room facility. As his success continued, VuDu moved into a 9,000 square foot multi-room recording compound in Port Jefferson, NY.

== Production credits ==
Year	Artist	Album	Credits
2002	As Tall As Lions	Blood and Aphorisms	Engineer, mixing, producer
2004	Hopesfall	A Types	Engineer, mixing
2005	As Cities Burn	Son, I Loved You At Your Darkest	Mixing
2005	The Almost	Demos	Engineer, mixing, Production
2005	The Chariot	Unsung (EP)	Engineer, mixing
2005	Yesterdays Rising	Lightworker	Mixing
2006	The Fold	This Too Shall Pass	Mixing
2006	As Tall As Lions	As Tall As Lions	Engineer, mixing, producer
2006	Glory of This	The Lover, The Lier, The Ruse	Engineer, mixing, Production
2007	Odd Project	Lovers, Fighters, Sinners, Saints	Mixing
2007	Bloodjinn	This Machine Runs on Empty	Engineer, producer
2007	Project 86	Rival Factions	Mixing
2007	The Junior Varsity	Cinematographic	Engineer, mixing, producer
2007	The Down To Earth Approach	Come Back To You	Mixing, producer
2007	Hopesfall	Magnetic North	Engineer, mixing, producer
2007	As Tall As Lions	Into The Flood	Engineer, mixing, Production
2008	The Scenic	Find Yourself Here	Mixing, producer
2008	Means	To Keep Me From Sinking	Mastering, Mixing, Producer
2008	1997	On The Run	Engineer, mixing
2009	The Dear Hunter	Act III: Life and Death	Mixing
2009	Story Of The Year	Dream is Over	Mixing
2010	The Scenic	Bipolaroid	Engineering, Mixing, Producer
2011	The Dear Hunter	The Color Spectrum	Engineering, Mixing, Producer
2011	Ruth	Payola	Mixing
2013	Gates	You Are All You Have Left To Fear	Mastering, Mixing
2013	K Sera	Collisions and Near Misses	Mixing
2013	The Dear Hunter	Migrant	Engineer, mixing, producer
2014	Scare Don't Fear	From The Ground Up	Mixing, producer
2014	Threads	All I've Ever Known	Engineer, mixing, Production
2014	Tides of Man	Young and Courageous	Mixing
2014	Gates	Bloom and Breathe	Engineer, mixing, producer
2015	Attalus	Into the Sea	Mixing
2015	The Dear Hunter	Act IV: Rebirth in Reprise	Mixing
2015	Owel	Every Good Boy	Engineer, mixing, Production
2016	O'Brother	Endless Light	Engineer, mixing, producer
2016	Gates	Parallel Lives	Engineer, mixing, producer
2016	All Get Out	Nobody Likes a Quitter	Mixing
2016	Hail The Sun	Culture Scars	Engineer, mixing, Production
2016	The Dear Hunter	Act V: Hymns with the Devil in Confessional	Mixing
2016	Sparrows	Let The Silence Stay Where It Was	Mixing
2016	Stolas	Self Titles	Engineer, mixing, Production
2016	Giraffe Tongue Orchestra	Broken Lines	Mixing
2016	The Dillinger Escape Plan	Dissociation	Engineer
2017	Crash The Calm	How've You Been?	Engineer
2017	Tides Of Man	Everything Nothing	Engineer, mixing, Production
2017	The Dear Hunter	All Is As All Should Be	Mixing
2017	Glassjaw	Material Control	Engineer, mixing
2018	Lume	Wrung Out	Engineer, mixing, Production
2018	Nathan Hussey	Hitchens	Mixing
2018	Hopefall	Arbiter	Engineer, mixing, Production
2018	Royal Coda	Self Titled	Engineer, mixing, Production
2018	Gatherers	We Are Alive Beyond Repair	Engineer, mixing, Production
2018	Eisley	I'm Only Dreaming...Of Days Long Past	Mixing
2018	Free Throw	What's Past is Prologue	Mixing
2018	All Get Out	No Bouquet	Engineer, mixing, Production
2018	Covet	effloresce	Producer
2019	The End of the Ocean	Aire	Mixing
2019	Natalie and the Damn Shandys	Overlook Trail: Part 1	Engineer, mixing, Production
2019	Covet	Acoustics	Engineer, mixing, Production
2019	Kurt Travis	There's A Place I Want to Take You	Engineer, mixing, Production
2019	Royal Coda	Compassion	Engineer, mixing, Production
2019	Yvette Young	Solo Piano EP	Engineer, mixing, Production
2019	Nova Charisma	Exposition 2	Engineer, mixing, Production
2020	Covet	Technicolor	Mixing, producer
2020	Hopefall	Hall of the Sky	Mixing,Production
2020	Kevin Devine	Nothing's Real, So Nothing's Wrong	Engineer
2020	Shy Low	Forthcoming EP	Engineer, mixing, Production
2020	The Dear Hunter	Forthcoming EP	Engineer (Drums)
2020	Donovan Melero	That City	Engineer, mixing, Production
2020	Skyler	Heyo	Engineer, mixing, Production
2020	Andres	Live Performance	Mixing
2020	Kurt Travis	Live Performance	Mixing
2020	Hail The Sun	Live Performance	Mixing
2020	The Dear Hunter	Honorary Astronaut EP.001	Mixing
2022	Thoughcrimes	Altered Pasts	Production, Mixing
2022	The Dear Hunter	Antimai	Mixing
2022	Donovan Melero	Chelsea Park After Dark	Engineer, mixing, Production
2026	The Dear Hunter	Sunya	Mixing
