= OWEL =

Alternative indie rock band

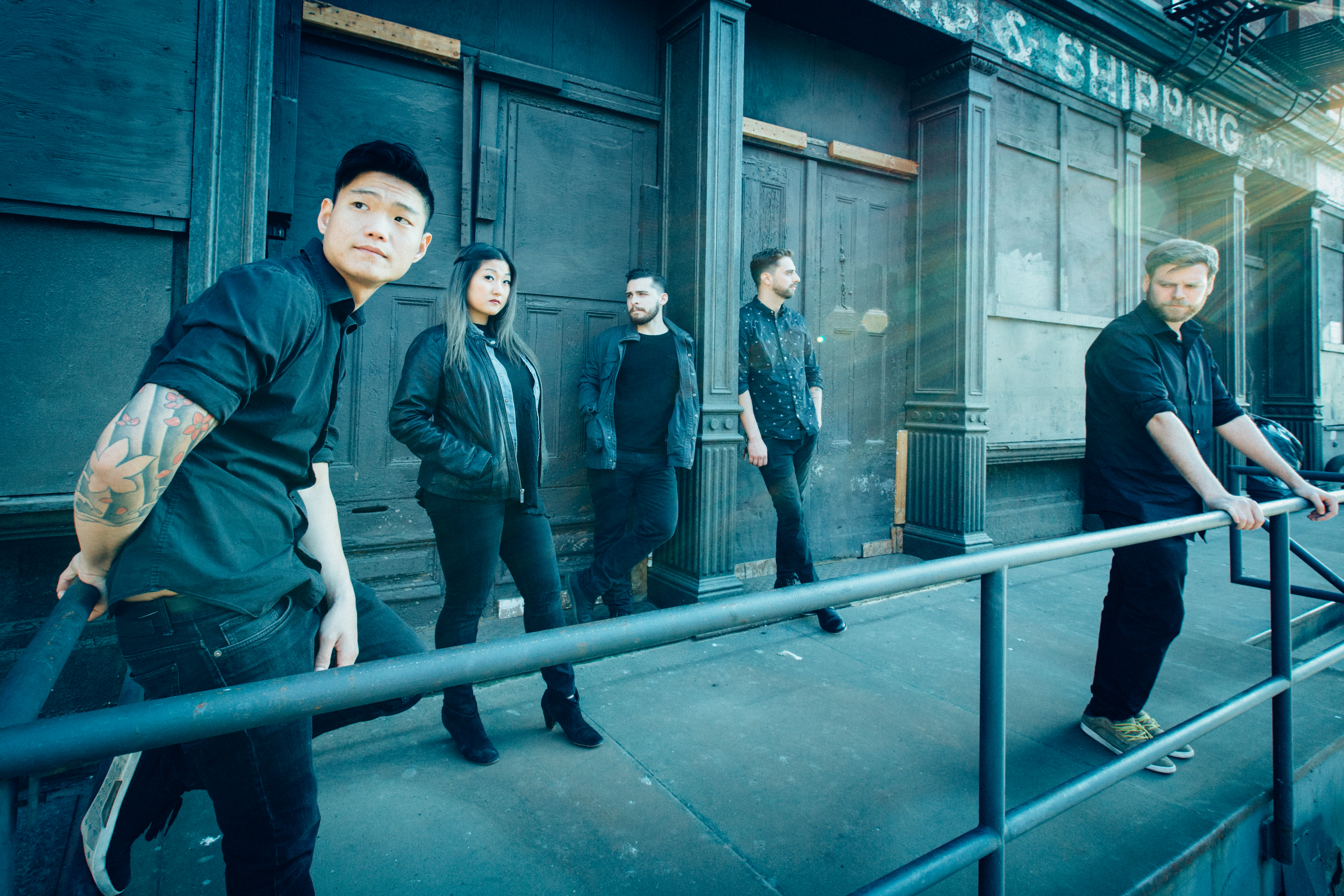

Background information
- Origin: Woodbridge, New Jersey, United States
- Genres: Alternative rock, indie rock, emo, post-rock, indie pop, symphonic rock, dream pop, ambient
- Years active: 2012–present
- Labels: Equal Vision Records
- Members: Jay Sakong; Nunzio Moudatsos; Seamus O'Connor; Ryan Vargas; Jane Park; George Maher
- Past members: Daniel Zaleski; Pat McGee; Patti Kilroy
- Website: http://www.owelband.com

OWEL is an alternative indie rock band formed in Woodbridge, NJ in late 2012. The band currently consists of Jay Sakong (lead vocal, guitar, keys), Nunzio Moudatsos (bass, vocals), Seamus O'Connor (guitar, keys, vocals), Jane Park (violin, viola, keys, vocals), and Ryan Vargas (percussion). The band signed to Equal Vision Records in 2016. According to lead singer Jay Sakong in an Instagram livestream, there is no meaning behind the band's name and it is supposed to be seen as just a name.

OWEL is known for incorporating orchestral elements into their alternative rock sound.

== History ==
=== Origins ===
The band began in late 2012 as a reincarnation of another group which included lead singer/guitarist Jay Sakong and percussionist Ryan Vargas who both attended the same high school in Woodbridge, NJ. Sakong later met guitarist/keyboardist Seamus O'Connor while both attended the Institute of Audio Research in New York City. Violinist/keyboardist Jane Park, a childhood friend of Sakong's, would eventually join the group which would later become OWEL. Bassist Nunzio Moudatsos, another high school friend of Sakong and Vargas, would join the band in 2015 after several member changes.

I knew everyone from different points of my life. Jane since I was a kid, Ryan and Nunzio from high school, and I took an audio engineering course with Seamus. When I was thinking about putting together a group of people to play music with I just thought of the people that were already in my life that I thought would be fun to work with.

=== Self-Titled LP (2013) ===
The band released their debut, self-titled LP on April 2, 2013 via boutique label intheclouds records. The album was recorded at The Machine Shop in Bellville, NJ, produced by Sakong, mixed and mastered by Will Putney.

=== Every Good Boy (2015) ===
On April 28, 2015 the band released the Every Good Boy EP via intheclouds records. The EP was recorded at VuDu Studios in Port Jefferson Village, NY and produced by Mike Watts (As Tall As Lions, The Dear Hunter, As Cities Burn, Tides of Man.)

=== Dear Me (2016) ===
In 2016 the band signed with Equal Vision Records and released Dear Me on November 11, 2016. Dear Me was co-produced by Sakong along with Kevin Dye, vocalist of the band Gates, at AudioPilot Studios in Boonton, NJ.

In support of the release of Dear Me the band embarked on various tours supporting the Soil & the Sun, Mae, and A Lot Like Birds between November 2016 and June 2017.

On August 9, 2017 the band announced via its social media pages that they were amicably parting ways with violinist/keyboardist Jane Park. A final performance with Park is forthcoming and the band has teased various images on social media of a studio session together in late August 2017. On October 13, 2017, it was announced that Patti Kilroy was their new violinist.

The band released a previously unheard B-side from the Dear Me sessions entitled "All I'll Ever Know" on August 25, 2017.

=== Paris (2019) ===
OWEL released the full-length LP, Paris, on March 29, 2019. The deluxe edition, including one additional song and several alternate song versions, released on November 8, 2019.

== Members ==
=== Current ===
- Jay Sakong - lead vocal, guitar, keys (2013–present)
- Nunzio Moudatsos - bass, vocals (2015–present)
- Seamus O'Connor - guitar, keys, vocals (2013–present)
- Ryan Vargas - percussion (2013–present)
- Jane Park - violin, viola, keys, vocals (2013–present)
- George Maher - trumpet, flugelhorn, keys (2019–present)

=== Former ===
- Daniel Zaleski - bass (2013)
- Pat McGee - bass (2013-2015)
- Patti Kilroy - violin, keys, vocals

== Discography ==
Full Length Albums

- OWEL (2013) intheclouds records
- Dear Me (2016) Equal Vision Records
- Live from Audio Pilot Studios (2017) Equal Vision Records
- Paris (2019)
- The Salt Water Well (2022)

EPs

- Every Good Boy (2015) intheclouds records

Singles

- All I'll Ever Know (2017) Equal Vision Records
