= Act III: Life and Death =

Studio album by The Dear Hunter
- Released: June 23, 2009
- Recorded: 2009
- Genres: Progressive rock, symphonic rock, experimental rock
- Length: 57:46
- Label: Triple Crown Records
- Producer: Casey Crescenzo

The Dear Hunter chronology
Random EP #2 (2008)	Act III: Life and Death (2009)	The Branches EP (2010)

Professional ratings
Review scores
Source	Rating
AbsolutePunk	(90%)
Allmusic	4/5 stars

Act III: Life and Death is the third studio album by American rock band The Dear Hunter, released on June 23, 2009. According to lead vocalist Casey Crescenzo, it is the third part of a six-act story, following the original in 2006, Act I: The Lake South, the River North, and 2007's Act II: The Meaning of, and All Things Regarding Ms. Leading, and preceding Act IV: Rebirth in Reprise (2015). The album was produced by Casey Crescenzo and Andy Wildrick in the band's own studio in Providence, Rhode Island, with a number of musicians making guest appearances.

As of July 1, 2009, the album had peaked on the Billboard 200 at #182 (the first time a Dear Hunter album ever cracked the top 200), #14 on the Billboard Top Heatseakers, and #31 on Top Independent Albums.

== Track listing ==
All tracks are written by Casey Crescenzo.

No.	Title	Length
1.	"Writing on a Wall"	1:38
2.	"In Cauda Venenum"	5:29
3.	"What It Means to be Alone"	4:49
4.	"The Tank"	4:39
5.	"The Poison Woman"	4:51
6.	"The Thief"	5:01
7.	"Mustard Gas"	4:13
8.	"Saved"	4:41
9.	"He Said He Had a Story"	3:39
10.	"This Beautiful Life"	4:05
11.	"Go Get Your Gun"	3:15
12.	"Son"	2:16
13.	"Father"	3:25
14.	"Life and Death"	5:45

=== Deluxe edition ===
The band released a deluxe edition of the album in a DVD-sized case that contained an autographed poster, picture-postcards with the lyrics to each song, and a storybook of the band's previous full-length album Act II: The Meaning of, and All Things Regarding Ms. Leading, which was illustrated by artist Kent St. John. In addition, the album came with four bonus tracks. The deluxe edition was only available through preorder of the album while supplies lasted, but was also seen at the merchandise table during The Dear Hunter's tour with Kay Kay and His Weathered Underground and mewithoutYou.

No.	Title	Length
1.	"Writing on a Wall" (a capella)	1:40
2.	"Untitled 1"	3:40
3.	"Movement 1"	1:54
4.	"Movement 2"	4:47

== Music video ==
The Dear Hunter, along with the help of artist Glenn Thomas, created an animated music video for their song "What It Means to Be Alone". Though the band still lacks an actual single, charting or otherwise, this is their second music video, the first being "The Church and the Dime" from their previous album.

== Personnel ==
- Casey Crescenzo – vocals, piano, organ, synthesizer, guitar, bass, banjo, production, engineering
- Andy Wildrick – guitar, acoustic guitar, vocals, engineering
- Erick Serna – guitars, vocals
- Nick Crescenzo – drums, percussion, vocals
- Nate Patterson – bass
- Mike Watts - Mixing

== Additional personnel ==
- Austin Hatch – clarinet, saxophone
- Pasquale Lanelli – saxophone
- Dave Calzone – trombone
- Andrew Mericle – trumpet
- Samantha Conway – French horn
- Charles Lidell – cello
- Angela Preston – violin, viola
- Mark Adelle – violin
- Lynn Mira – harp
- Mike Watts – mixing
