= The Branches =

Branches EP

EP by The Dear Hunter
- Released: 2010
- Recorded: 2009–2010
- Genre: Progressive rock, experimental rock
- Length: 11:43
- Label: Self-released
- Producer: Casey Crescenzo

The Dear Hunter chronology
Act III: Life and Death (2009)	Branches EP (2010)	The Color Spectrum (2011)

The Branches EP is the fourth and digital-only EP released by The Dear Hunter. It was an exclusive release for the limited edition "Lifetime Fan Club Package" granted to 250 people. An official or physical release is unknown at this time, but was considered by the band's front man Casey Crescenzo. The track "Owls" was later reworked for their 2013 B-sides album, The Migrations Annex.

Unlike previous releases, The Branches EP holds no ties to the main storyline found throughout the band's Acts series. All three songs are original with both "B.Linus" and "Isabella" holding reference to the television series Lost.

== Track listing ==
1. "B. Linus" - 4:04
2. "Isabella" - 4:15
3. "Owls" - 3:22
