= A Night on the Town =

A Night on the Town may refer to:

- A Night on the Town (film) (1987), UK title of the film Adventures in Babysitting
- A Night on the Town (Bruce Hornsby album), Bruce Hornsby and the Range's third album, released in 1990
- A Night on the Town (Rod Stewart album), Rod Stewart's seventh album, released in 1976
- "A Night on the Town", a song by The Dear Hunter from the 2015 album Act IV: Rebirth in Reprise
- A Night on the Town, a 1983 TV movie with Eartha Kitt
- A Night on the Town, a 1972 album by Brownsville Station
