= Casey Crescenzo =

American singer-songwriter

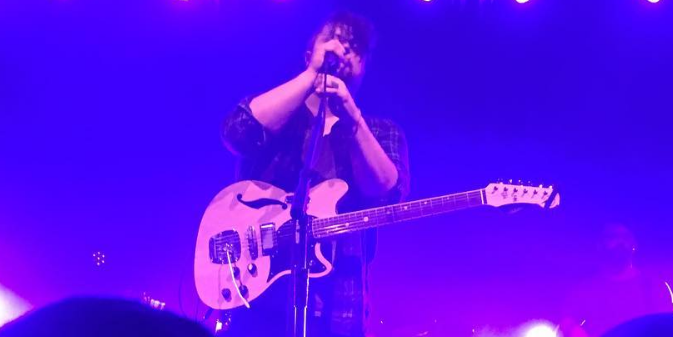
- Crescenzo performing with The Dear Hunter in 2017

Background information
- Born: December 19, 1983 (age 42)
- Genres: Indie, post-hardcore, progressive rock, alternative
- Occupations: Musician, writer
- Instruments: Guitar, keyboards, sitar, fender rhodes, vocals
- Years active: 2003–present
- Website: www.caseycrescenzo.com

Casey Crescenzo (born December 19, 1983) is an American singer, songwriter, and multi-instrumentalist, most notable for being the singer for the bands The Dear Hunter and The Receiving End of Sirens. He is also a producer who has worked with many other bands.

== Career ==
=== The Receiving End of Sirens (2004–2006) ===
Crescenzo's start as a musician began in high school with a band called Anomaly, then a band named Dillusion. He eventually moved into in the Boston music scene when a musical act, the notably established The Receiving End of Sirens (TREOS) approached him, offering him the opportunity to perform along with them in light of a recent falling out with former vocalist Ben Potrykus. After hearing Crescenzo's vocal work they offered to sign him on to the band permanently, which he accepted. The band then went to work on their self-titled E.P. and found that not only could Crescenzo sing, he could also write in a very romantic/poetic format, which gave Casey the reins to some of the writing for the five track disc, along with bassist Brendan Brown. The half-length was well received by the public and Triple Crown Records extended the band a contract in 2004, just a few weeks after declaring on their website that the band would not sign to a label because only minor labels had offered them contracts at the time.

TREOS was then rushed into developing their first album, Between the Heart and the Synapse. On the album Crescenzo played guitar, Rhodes piano, an electric sitar, and various other instruments while also helping in the production of the album and the segues from one track to another.

=== The Dear Hunter (2005–present) ===
While a member of TREOS, Crescenzo wrote the Dear Ms. Leading Demos, tracks that did not seem to fit the style TREOS had become accustomed to playing. Casey decided after he parted ways with TREOS to devote his time and abilities to The Dear Hunter and make it his full-time band. In September 2006, the band released its first album Act I: The Lake South, The River North on Triple Crown Records. The album was widely praised by critics, despite negative feedback from fans due to its irregular and unique styles, which, though not completely unlike those of TREOS, were distinguishably different from his former band. As time wore on more and more fans began to gravitate towards The Dear Hunter because of the intricate storyline woven within their first album, a tale of a young man who lost his overwhelmingly caring and affectionate prostitute mother at a young age. The Dear Hunter exploded onto the music scene in May 2007 when the band released their first full-length album, Act II: The Meaning of, and All Things Regarding Ms. Leading, a continuation of Act I, throughout which the main character has various encounters with a certain young female, Ms. Leading, a prostitute like his mother who misleads him into believing that she loved him after a night spent alone together that ended in a loss of the boy's virginity. A book based on the story of Act II has been completed and authored by Crescenzo. Artist, Kent St. John is currently working on the illustrations for the book. Crescenzo is currently looking for a publisher or will publish it on his own, a process that may take a while. He also produced the album Fangs for the band Falling Up in 2008.

== Discography ==
=== Studio albums ===
Recorded and released with The Receiving End of Sirens:

- 2005: Between the Heart and the Synapse

Recorded and released with The Dear Hunter:

- 2006: Act I: The Lake South, the River North
- 2007: Act II: The Meaning of, and All Things Regarding Ms. Leading
- 2009: Act III: Life and Death
- 2011: The Color Spectrum
- 2013: Migrant
- 2015: Act IV: Rebirth in Reprise
- 2016: Act V: Hymns with the Devil in Confessional
- 2020: The Fox and the Hunt
- 2021: The Indigo Child
- 2022: Antimai
- 2023: Migrant Returned
- 2026: Sunya

Recorded, produced, and released with Falling Up:

- 2009: Fangs!
- 2011: Your Sparkling Death Cometh

Recorded, produced, performed, and released with The Brobecks.

- 2009: Violent Things

Recorded and released with The River Empires:

- 2010: The River Empires (Epilogue)

Recorded and released with Honorary Astronaut:

- 2021: EP 001

=== Extended plays ===
Recorded and released with The Dear Hunter:

- Random EP #1
- Random EP #2
- The Branches EP
- All Is As All Should Be
- North American EP

=== Other appearances ===
Recorded and released with The Receiving End of Sirens:

- 2006: "Superman" (from Sound of Superman)

Recorded, produced, and performed on Hollywood Lies – Building An Empire (2007)

Recorded, produced, and performed on Amplifiers – Everything Obsolete (2012)

Recorded, produced, and performed on Collisions & Near Misses - K Será

Solo recordings:

- "Beautiful Girls" (Sean Kingston cover)
- "Brazil" (Frank Sinatra cover)
- "The War of All Against All" (acoustic)
- "This Armistice" (acoustic)
- "Paycheck"
- "Unraveled" (Björk cover)
- "Amour And Attrition" (Symphony Album)
- "Get Yours While You Can" (Anthony Green cover)
- "Goodbye Yellow Brick Road" (Elton John cover)

Guest appearances:

- "Genesis" – Forgive Durden
- "Terra Firma" – The Woods Brothers
- "Perhaps On the Highway" – Dakota
- "Take the Next Step" – The Jon Hill Project
