= All Is as All Should Be =

EP by The Dear Hunter
- Released: December 1, 2017
- Recorded: Fall 2016
- Genre: Progressive rock, indie rock, experimental rock
- Length: 24:58
- Label: Cave and Canary Goods
- Producer: Casey Crescenzo

The Dear Hunter chronology
Act V: Hymns with the Devil in Confessional (2016)	All Is as All Should Be (2017)	The Fox and the Hunt (2020)

All Is as All Should Be is an EP by American progressive rock band The Dear Hunter, released on December 1, 2017 via Cave and Canary Goods.

The official announcement was made on the band's social networks and website, where Casey thanked the fans for their unconditional support and explained what the EP was all about:

Our goal would be to invite our friends—fans of the band—into the creative process... to be a conduit for their hearts and minds. While every single one of you is wholly unique, this EP, and these people, represent the extended family of The Dear Hunter – all of you leaving a fingerprint on these songs, and this project.

The tracks from this EP were recorded in different places, in old fan houses and closer to the band.

On October 27, 2017, the track "The Right Wrong" was released through streaming platforms and on the band's YouTube channel.

PopMatters said it was consistent with their prior releases, calling it "remarkable."

It reached 13 as a peak position on the Independent Albums Billboard chart on December 23, 2017.

== Track listing ==
No.	Title	Length
1.	"The Right Wrong"	4:39
2.	"Blame Paradise"	3:41
3.	"Beyond The Pale"	3:16
4.	"Shake Me (Awake)"	3:55
5.	"Witness Me"	4:26
6.	"All Is As All Should Be"	5:01
Total length:		24:58

== Personnel ==
The Dear Hunter

- Casey Crescenzo – Lead Vocals, Guitar, Bass guitar, Keyboards
- Nick Crescenzo – Drums, Percussion, Backing Vocals
- Maxwell Tousseau – Guitar, Keyboards, Percussion, Backing Vocals
- Robert Parr – Guitar, Keyboards, Backing Vocals
- Nick Sollecito – Bass guitar
- Gavin Castleton – Keyboards, Backing Vocals
