= Nocturnes (Daniel Liam Glyn album) =

Studio album by Daniel Liam Glyn
- Released: 18 September 2020
- Recorded: April – June 2020
- Venue: Home Studio, Manchester
- Genre: Instrumental; electronic; ambient; contemporary; new wave
- Length: 27:23
- Label: Caravan Boy Records
- Producer: Daniel Liam Glyn

Daniel Liam Glyn chronology
Changing Stations (2016)	Nocturnes (2020)

Singles from Nocturnes
- 1. "San Andreas Fault" Released: 27 August 2020; 2. "Scratched Nights / Little Death" Released: 10 September 2020; 3. "I Move The Stars For No One" Released: 29 April 2021

Nocturnes (sometimes styled as NOCTURNES) is the sophomore concept album by British composer Daniel Liam Glyn, released on 18 September 2020 via Caravan Boy Records. Glyn describes the album as 'a collection of electronic, ambient soundscapes influenced by my dreams and inspired by the enigmatic thrill of night-time' and was recorded during the COVID-19 pandemic in 2020. On 14 May 2021, Glyn released a special edition of the album titled Nocturnes (Expanded Universe Edition). This release included all the original tracks plus 5 exclusive new tracks.

== Critical reception ==
David Reddish from Queerty described the record as "ominous and optimistic - perfect for dancing or chilling" and cites it as "a perfect soundtrack for moving into Autumn". Nick Randell from SNS Online commented on the shift in style from Glyn's previous work, describing the album as possessing an "urban, dystopian vibe" with tracks that were "melodic, complex and thought provoking".

== Track listing ==
All tracks are written by Daniel Liam Glyn

Nocturnes
No.	Title	Producer(s)	Length
1.	"The Midnight Zone (I)"	Daniel Liam Glyn	1:37
2.	"Scratched Nights"	Glyn; Bjorn Thomassen^{[a]}	3.24
3.	"I Move The Stars For No One"	Glyn; Thomassen^{[a]}	3.18
4.	"Losing You"	Glyn	4.35
5.	"The Abyssal Zone (II)"	Glyn	1.59
6.	"Suspended In Orbit"	Glyn	3:08
7.	"Little Death"	Glyn	4:09
8.	"San Andreas Fault"	Glyn; Thomassen^{[a]}	3.19
9.	"The Twilight Zone (III)"	Glyn	1.54
Total length:			27:23

All tracks are written by Daniel Liam Glyn

Nocturnes (Expanded Universe Edition) – Digital Download
No.	Title	Producer(s)	Length
10.	"[Zzz]"	Glyn; Thomassen^{[a]}	0:37
11.	"Scratched Nights (Vårum Extended Mix)"	Glyn; Thomassen^{[a]}	5.12
12.	"I Move the Stars for No One (Vårum Berghain Remix)"	Thomassen	5.44
13.	"Little Death (Rigil Remix)"	Rigil	4.35
14.	"San Andreas Fault (Rigil Remix)"	Rigil	4.47
Total length:			48:18

- ^{^[a]} signifies an additional producer.

== Personnel ==
Credits adapted from the liner notes of Nocturnes (Expanded Universe Edition).

- Daniel Liam Glyn – composer, arranger, producer (all tracks), art direction, graphic design
- Bjorn Thomassen – additional production (tracks 2, 3, 8, 10, 11), mixing (tracks 2, 3, 4, 5, 8, 10, 11), remix (track 12)
- Fi Roberts – mixing (tracks 1, 4, 6, 7, 9)
- Rigil – remix (tracks 13, 14)
- Katie Tavini – mastering (all tracks)
- Heather Matthews – graphic design

== Release history ==
Region	Date	Format	Label	Edition	Ref.
Various	18 September 2020	digital download; streaming	Caravan Boy Records	Standard	
Various	12 May 2021	LP; cassette	Caravan Boy Records	Standard	
Various	14 May 2021	digital download; streaming	Caravan Boy Records	Expanded	
