= Attalus (band) =

American Christian rock band

- Origin: Raleigh, North Carolina
- Genres: Christian rock; experimental rock; alternative rock; post-rock; post-hardcore
- Years active: 2010–2017 (hiatus)
- Labels: Facedown Records
- Members: Evan King; Joseph Couillard
- Past members: Seth Davey; Adam King; John Amos; John Sierra; Chris Sierra

Attalus is an American Christian rock band from Raleigh, North Carolina. The band started making music in 2010, with members, lead vocalist and keyboardist, Seth Davey, guitarist and background vocalist, Evan King, drummer, Adam King, bassist and background vocalist, Chris Sierra, and guitarist, John Sierra. The band released one extended play, The Greater Tide, independently, in 2010. Their next release, an album, Post Tenebras Lux, was released independently, in 2011. They released, another extended play, Brighter Side, in 2012. The subsequent album, also released independently, Gospel Hymns, Vol. 1, came out in 2013. They signed with Facedown Records, where they released, Into the Sea, a studio album, in 2015. This album was their breakthrough release upon the Billboard charts, where it placed on the Christian Albums chart. They released a message on facebook detailing their daily problems and the possibly permanent ending of Attalus.

== Background ==
Attalus is a rock band from Raleigh, North Carolina. Their current lineup consists of lead vocalist and guitarist, Evan King and guitarist, Joseph Couillard.

== Music history ==
The band commenced as a musical entity in 2010, with their first release, The Greater Tide, an extended play, that released Independently on December 28, 2010. They released an album, Post Tenebras Lux, on November 18, 2011, independently. Their next release, an extended play, was released on July 27, 2012, via BandCamp. The group released another independently made album, Gospel Hymns Vol. 1, on April 19, 2013. They signed to Facedown Records, where they released their first studio album, Into the Sea, on June 2, 2015. This album was their breakthrough release upon the Billboard magazine charts, where it placed on the Christian Albums chart, at a peak of No. 31.

== Members ==
Current

- Evan King - vocals, guitar
- Joseph Couillard - guitar, background vocals

Former

- Adam King - drums (2010–2011)
- John Amos - bass, background vocals (2011–2013)
- John Sierra - guitar, background vocals (2010–2015)
- Seth Davey - vocals, keys (2010–2016)
- Chris Sierra - drums, background vocals (2010-2017)

== Discography ==
Studio albums

List of studio albums, with selected chart positions
Title	Album details	Peak chart positions
Title	Album details	US Christ
Into the Sea	Released: June 2, 2015; Label: Facedown; Format: CD, digital download	31

Independent albums

- Post Tenebras Lux (November 18, 2011, Independent)
- Gospel Hymns, Vol. 1 (April 19, 2013, Independent)

EPs

- The Greater Tide (December 28, 2010, Independent)
- Brighter Side (July 27, 2012, Independent)
