= Migrant (album) =

Studio album by The Dear Hunter
- Released: April 2, 2013
- Genre: Indie rock, progressive rock, experimental rock
- Length: 50:23
- Label: Equal Vision
- Producer: Casey Crescenzo, Mike Watts

The Dear Hunter chronology
The Color Spectrum (2011)	Migrant (2013)	Act IV: Rebirth in Reprise (2015)

Professional ratings
Aggregate scores
Source	Rating
Metacritic	78/100
Review scores
Source	Rating
AllMusic	3.5/5 stars
Consequence of Sound	C−
PopMatters	8/10 stars
Under The Gun Review	10/10

Migrant is the fifth studio album by The Dear Hunter. It was released on April 2, 2013, via Equal Vision Records and Cave & Canary Goods. The album was produced by Mike Watts and Casey Crescenzo, and mixed by Mike Watts. It is the band's first non-concept album. In 2023, as part of the album's tenth anniversary, it was remixed and re-released as Migrant Returned.

== Track listing ==
All tracks are written by Casey Crescenzo.

No.	Title	Length
1.	"Bring You Down"	4:24
2.	"Whisper"	3:59
3.	"Shame"	4:04
4.	"An Escape"	3:38
5.	"Shouting at the Rain"	4:16
6.	"The Kiss of Life"	4:46
7.	"Girl"	3:04
8.	"Cycles"	4:33
9.	"Sweet Naiveté"	4:32
10.	"Let Go"	3:40
11.	"This Vicious Place"	4:40
12.	"Don't Look Back"	4:47

iTunes bonus tracks
No.	Title	Length
13.	"Dig Your Own Grave"	3:26
14.	"Old Demons"	3:39
15.	"The Love"	5:07

Migrant Reprise bonus tracks (released separately as "The Migrations Annex" EP)
No.	Title	Length
13.	"Dig Your Own Grave"	3:24
14.	"Middle Ground"	4:12
15.	"Like Crazy"	3:56
16.	"Old Demons"	3:36
17.	"Owls"	3:39
18.	"The Love"	5:06

Migrant Returned (2023) reissue tracklist
No.	Title	Length
1.	"An Escape"	3:08
2.	"Girl"	3:03
3.	"Let Go"	3:38
4.	"The Kiss of Life"	4:22
5.	"Sweet Naiveté"	4:31
6.	"Whisper"	3:58
7.	"Shame"	4:01
8.	"This Vicious Place"	4:39
9.	"Middle Ground"	3:38
10.	"Bring You Down"	4:02
11.	"Like Crazy"	3:29
12.	"Shouting at the Rain"	3:51
13.	"Cycles"	4:32
14.	"Dig Your Own Grave"	3:15
15.	"Don't Look Back"	4:36
16.	"Owls"	3:42
17.	"Old Demons"	3:14
18.	"The Love"	5:08
Total length:		70:45
