= Friends II =

EP by B'z
- Released: November 25, 1996
- Genre: Soft rock
- Length: 27:35
- Label: Rooms Records
- Producer: Tak Matsumoto

B'z chronology
Friends (1992)	Friends II (1996)	Friends III (2021)

Friends II is the fifth mini-album by the Japanese rock duo B'z, released in 1996. The album sold 1,466,650 copies and reached No. 1 on Oricon.

== Track listing ==
1. Friends II -1:00
2. Snow -4:06
3. Shoushin (傷心) -5:04
4. Baby Moon -3:27
5. Sasanqua ~ fuyu no hi (sasanqua ～ 冬の陽) -4:27
6. Aru hiso kana koi (ある密かな恋) -4:03
7. Kimi wo tsurete (きみをつれて) -5:26

== Certifications ==
Region	Certification	Certified units/sales
Japan (RIAJ)	4× Platinum	800,000^{^}
^{^} Shipments figures based on certification alone.
