= Into the Sea =

Studio album by Attalus
- Released: June 2, 2015
- Genre: Christian alternative rock, experimental rock, post-rock, post-hardcore
- Length: 77:52
- Label: Facedown

Attalus chronology
Gospel Hymns Vol. 1 (2013)	Into the Sea (2015)

Into the Sea is the first studio album by Attalus. Facedown Records released the album on June 2, 2015.

== Critical reception ==
Professional ratings
Review scores
Source	Rating
Cross Rhythms	8/10 squares
Indie Vision Music	5/5 stars
Jesus Freak Hideout	4/5 stars 4.5/5 stars
Metal.de	9/10

Ian Webber, indicating in an eight out of ten review by Cross Rhythms, says, "Beautiful, moody, moving and sensitive, this is a recording that at its best demands your attention, but can also outstay its welcome as some of the material included could have been lost without affecting the overall feel and message of the package." Awarding the album four stars from Jesus Freak Hideout, Michael Weaver writes, "Into the Sea manages to keep a central theme with the nautical references and, on top of that, does a nice job of keeping it fresh the entire time."

Christopher Smith, giving the album four stars for Jesus Freak Hideout, states, "musically as heavy as their label mates...Into The Sea is an ambitious concept album". Rating the album four and a half stars at Jesus Freak Hideout, David Craft describes, "Into the Sea defines itself in a fashion which most concept albums only dream of." Scott Swan, awarding the album five stars by Indie Vision Music, says, "Attalus has taken great care in creating a lasting piece that will live on, likely providing continued discoveries for many listens to come."

== Track listing ==
Track listing
No.	Title	Length
1.	"The Ancient Mariner"	0:52
2.	"The Ship Is Going Down"	5:14
3.	"Sirens"	3:25
4.	"Desolate, Isle"	6:52
5.	"Man, O Shipwreck"	3:38
6.	"Step Out"	5:34
7.	"Albatross"	4:13
8.	"The Breath Before the Plunge"	5:12
9.	"Into the Sea"	5:26
10.	"Coming Clean"	4:05
11.	"O the Depths"	5:12
12.	"Voices from the Shore"	3:01
13.	"Safe"	5:22
14.	"The Greater Tide"	4:40
15.	"Death Be Not Proud"	8:14
16.	"Message In a Bottle"	6:52
Total length:		77:52

== Chart performance ==
Chart (2015)	Peak position
US Christian Albums (Billboard)	31
