= Daniel Liam Glyn =

British music composer (born 1986)

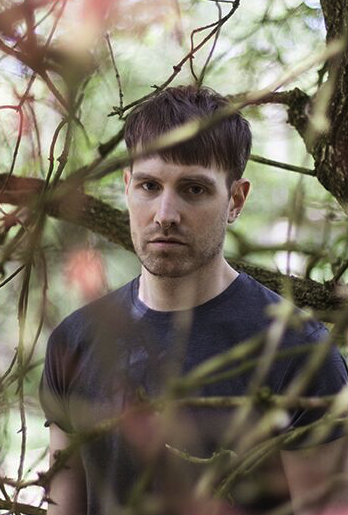

Background information
- Born: 3 October 1986 (age 39); Manchester, England
- Genres: Experimental; classical; contemporary; electronic
- Occupation: Composer
- Instrument(s): Piano, vocals
- Years active: 2012–present
- Labels: Caravan Boy Records
- Website: www.danielliamglyn.com

Daniel Liam Glyn (born 3 October 1986) is a British music composer. He is most known for combining his music writing with his neurological condition, synaesthesia. Glyn's work has been heavily influenced by his unique way of visualising numbers, letters, and words in his mind with specific colours, and was the inspiration for his first album, Changing Stations. Glyn founded Caravan Boy Records in 2016.

Glyn is the great-nephew of the late Welsh footballer Ray Lambert who played for Liverpool between 1939 and 1956.

== Career ==
=== 2015-2017: Changing Stations ===
Changing Stations is a classical-contemporary music project based on the 11 main lines of the London Underground and composed using Grapheme–colour synesthesia. The idea began when Glyn graduated from university and subsequently moved to London. After being inspired by the London Underground Map, he decided to write 11 pieces for piano based on each main line of the underground network

Glyn added vocal clips of Underground passengers to several tracks on the record, as he aimed to join the characteristics and emotions of each tube line with the thoughts, feelings and descriptions of real London commuters.

His work has been featured in publications including Time Out, The Big Issue, and Norwegian Air's inflight magazine.

=== 2020-2021: Nocturnes and The Drag Manifesto ===
Glyn's second album Nocturnes, a collection of electronic, ambient soundscapes influenced by his dreams and inspired by the enigmatic thrill of night-time, was composed entirely during the COVID-19 lockdown and released in September 2020. On 14 May 2021, Glyn released a special edition of the album titled Nocturnes (Expanded Universe Edition). This release included all the original tracks plus five new tracks.

In 2021, Glyn composed the score for The Drag Manifesto, a short documentary by Felipe Follador showcasing three drag artists discussing the art of drag and sharing their drag manifesto. The film premiered at the Cannes Indie Shorts Awards and the Toronto Short Film Festival.

== Influences ==
Glyn cites his admiration for the works of Erik Satie, Steve Reich, John Cage, Michael Andrews, and Eric Whitacre grew during his time studying composition at the University of Salford and inspired him to embark on a career of contemporary composing. He also states that Kate Bush, Woodkid and Goldfrapp are sources of inspiration.

== Discography ==
- Changing Stations (2016)
- Nocturnes (2020)
- When The Devil Drives (2024)
