= Friends III =

EP by B'z
- Released: December 8, 2021
- Recorded: 2021
- Genre: Soft rock
- Length: 24:57
- Label: Vermillion
- Producer: Tak Matsumoto

B'z chronology
Friends II (1996)	Friends III (2021)

Friends III is the sixth mini-album by the Japanese rock duo B'z. It was released on December 8, 2021. It's a concept album and is a sequel to their previous mini-album, Friends II, released in 1996.

The mini-album came in three editions: a standard edition, a first press edition with a DVD featuring a re-recording of their song "Itsuka no Merry Christmas" from their fourth mini-album, Friends, and a special Live Friends box featuring the standard edition with a glass, which was only available to those who purchased live tickets and was only sold through B'z Club-Gym.

The mini-album debuted at number one on both the Oricon weekly albums chart and on the Billboard Japan Hot Albums chart.

== Background ==
During the COVID-19 pandemic, guitarist Tak Matsumoto went back and forth between Japan and the United States. During a mandatory isolation after returning to Japan, he decided to make one song a day. The songs produced matched up to the style of the past Friends mini-albums, which led Matsumoto to propose producing a third entry into the series, to which vocalist Koshi Inaba agreed.

== Track listing ==
All lyrics are written by Koshi Inaba; all music is composed by Tak Matsumoto

No.	Title	Length
1.	"Harunohi"	0:35
2.	"Season End (シーズンエンド, Season End)"	4:38
3.	"Midarechiru (ミダレチル, Scatter in Pieces)"	3:53
4.	"Friends III"	2:02
5.	"Butterfly"	3:54
6.	"Konna Toki Take Anata ga Koishii (こんな時だけあなたが恋しい, I Miss You Only at Such Times)"	4:40
7.	"Grow & Glow"	5:19
Total length:		24:57

Limited Edition DVD

No.	Title	Length
1.	"Itsuka no Merry Christmas (いつかのメリークリスマス, That One Merry Christmas)" (Friends III Edit)

== Charts ==
Chart (2021)	Peak position
Japanese Albums (Oricon)	1
Japanese Hot Albums (Billboard Japan)	1

== Certifications ==
Region	Certification	Certified units/sales
Japan (RIAJ)	Gold	100,000^{^}
^{^} Shipments figures based on certification alone.
