= The Color Spectrum =

- 11-track, standard-edition cover.

Studio album by The Dear Hunter
- Released: June 14, 2011
- Recorded: 2010–2011
- Genres: Black: industrial rock, alternative rock Red: grunge, hard rock Orange: blues rock, hard rock Yellow: psychedelic rock, pop rock Green: folk, country Blue: soft rock, experimental rock Indigo: electronica Violet: baroque pop, alternative rock, symphonic rock White: alternative rock, progressive rock, post-rock
- Length: 41:45 (standard); 144:21 (complete EP set)
- Label: Triple Crown Records
- Producer: Casey Crescenzo

The Dear Hunter chronology
The Branches EP (2010)	The Color Spectrum (2011)	Migrant (2013)

Complete Edition cover
- Cover for the "complete edition", featuring the full project.

Professional ratings
Aggregate scores
Source	Rating
Metacritic	81/100
Review scores
Source	Rating
AbsolutePunk	89%
AllMusic	3.5/5 stars
Alternative Press	4/5 stars
PopMatters	8/10 stars

The Color Spectrum is the name of both the fourth studio album by American progressive rock band The Dear Hunter, and a series of nine EPs by the band, each of which reflects an individual color of the visible color spectrum (namely Black, Red, Orange, Yellow, Green, Blue, Indigo, Violet, White). This project was envisioned by frontman Casey Crescenzo as a way to interpret the colors of the spectrum via music. It is their first album that is not part of a common storyline with the rest of their work.

The Color Spectrum was released on June 14, 2011, in two different versions: the "standard" edition, featuring selected songs from the project, and the "Complete Collection" edition, featuring all nine EPs.

== Background and recording ==
Brendan Brown (formerly in The Receiving End of Sirens with Casey) played bass guitar on the Orange EP. Jessy Ribordy (Falling Up) played mandolin on the Green EP. Naive Thieves helped with songs on the Yellow and Blue EPs. Andy Hull (Manchester Orchestra) provided vocals on tracks 1–3 on the Red EP. Tanner Merritt (O'Brother) sang on "A Curse Of Cynicism". Mike Watts co produced the White and Violet EPs

On April 7, 2011, Crescenzo announced via Twitter that The Color Spectrum was finished.

== Promotion and release ==
On April 14, 2011, the band released a free MP3 download of "Deny It All" from the Red EP on their website. On April 26, Alternative Press debuted a lyric video for "This Body" from the Black EP, created by Crescenzo.

== Concept ==
The Color Spectrum's influence is the subjectivity of perception and to a lesser extent the freedom it affords its viewer. Crescenzo remarks:

Anything we think of, we can do. Humanity's idea of colors is too broad. This needs to be more personal, because ideas of colors vary from person to person. Even for people who have synesthesia, the specific images or sounds they hear attached to colors vary from person to person. And that just reinforces the point of doing the project, to produce our interpretation of color, the way we feel about colors or are inspired by the colors – how we hear them or see them.

== Track listings ==
=== Standard release track listing ===
All tracks are written by Casey Crescenzo.

No.	Title	Length
1.	"Filth and Squalor (Black)"	4:01
2.	"Deny It All (Red)"	3:34
3.	"But There's Wolves? (Orange)"	4:04
4.	"She's Always Singing (Yellow)"	2:40
5.	"Things That Hide Away (Green)"	3:24
6.	"The Canopy (Green)"	3:52
7.	"Trapdoor (Blue)"	3:54
8.	"What Time Taught Us (Indigo)"	4:07
9.	"Lillian (Violet)"	4:07
10.	"Home (White)"	3:55
11.	"Fall and Flee (White)"	4:07

=== Complete collection track listing ===
Black EP
No.	Title	Length
1.	"Never Forgive, Never Forget"	4:41
2.	"Filth and Squalor"	4:01
3.	"Take More Than You Need"	4:30
4.	"This Body"	4:47

Red EP
No.	Title	Length
1.	"I Couldn't Do It Alone"	3:29
2.	"A Curse of Cynicism"	3:11
3.	"Deny It All"	3:34
4.	"We've Got a Score to Settle"	3:45

Orange EP
No.	Title	Length
1.	"Echo"	4:06
2.	"Stuck On a Wire, Out On a Fence"	3:08
3.	"A Sea of Solid Earth"	4:41
4.	"But There's Wolves?"	4:06

Yellow EP
No.	Title	Length
1.	"She's Always Singing"	2:40
2.	"The Dead Don't Starve"	4:57
3.	"A Sua Voz"	3:20
4.	"Misplaced Devotion"	3:46

Green EP
No.	Title	Length
1.	"Things That Hide Away"	3:24
2.	"The Canopy"	3:52
3.	"Crow and Cackle"	5:43
4.	"The Inheritance"	3:26

Blue EP
No.	Title	Length
1.	"Tripping in Triplets"	3:52
2.	"Trapdoor"	3:54
3.	"What You Said"	5:04
4.	"The Collapse of the Great Tide Cliffs"	5:33

Indigo EP
No.	Title	Length
1.	"What Time Taught Us"	4:07
2.	"Mandala"	4:55
3.	"Progress"	3:35
4.	"Therma"	2:43

Violet EP
No.	Title	Length
1.	"Mr. Malum"	3:57
2.	"Lillian"	4:07
3.	"Too Late"	4:03
4.	"Look Away"	3:41

White EP
No.	Title	Length
1.	"Home"	3:55
2.	"Fall and Flee"	4:05
3.	"No God"	3:49
4.	"Lost But Not All Gone"	3:58
