= Changing Stations =

Studio album by Daniel Liam Glyn
- Released: 28 October 2016
- Recorded: July 2015 – May 2016
- Venue: Manchester, London, Suffolk
- Genre: Instrumental; classical; contemporary; electronic; alternative
- Length: 50:23
- Label: Caravan Boy Records
- Producer: Katie Tavini

Daniel Liam Glyn chronology
Changing Stations (2016)	Nocturnes (2020)

Singles from Changing Stations
- 1. "Monday" Released: 16 September 2016; 2. "Loop" Released: 14 October 2016; 3. "Abode" Released: 20 January 2017; 4. "Melancholy" Released: 24 February 2017; 5. "Diameter" Released: 26 May 2017

Changing Stations is a classical-contemporary concept album by British composer Daniel Liam Glyn, released on 28 October 2016 via Caravan Boy Records. The album's first single, "Monday", was released to digital music retailers on 16 September 2016.

== Background and release ==
Shortly after graduating from The University of Salford, Glyn relocated to London and began seeking inspiration for a collection of new piano pieces to coincide with his neurological condition, Synaesthesia. Glyn soon began to study the London Underground tube map and felt a connection between his Synaesthesia and each of the tube lines colours, and decided to study them in more detail to gain a better understanding of each line and their contrasting atmospheres and type of commuter.

Work on the compositions began in late 2012 and concluded in 2014. The eleven tracks featured on the album are based on each of the London Underground's main tube lines: Bakerloo, Central, Circle, District, Hammersmith and City, Jubilee, Metropolitan, Northern, Piccadilly, Victoria, and Waterloo and City, and are composed in the keys of G minor, A major, C major, F♯ minor, E major, B major, A♭ major, D major, D minor, B♭ major and D minor respectively. Each track focuses heavily on the different speeds, sounds, and mood of each line, and are composed in the key signature synaesthetically assigned by Glyn with reference to the colour of the tube line on the map. The thoughts, opinions and descriptions of the London Underground can be heard throughout the record by commuters of the network, along with stories of different events in the city. The recording of the album took place between 2014 and 2015 in both Manchester and London through the use of computers and mobile phones, paying homage to the revolution in technology on the London Underground since its inception. Elements of prepared piano can be heard on several tracks on the record, replicating and imitating the sounds of the train carriages and train tracks in movement. Items such as credit cards, oyster cards, paper money, coins, and tube maps, (all of which are frequently used to travel on the London Underground), were strategically placed between the strings of piano to produce an array of different rhythmic and percussive sounds, drawing inspiration from composers such as John Cage and Maurice Delage who also used this technique.

"Melancholy", the ninth track on the album, is based on the 7th July 2005 terrorist attack on the network's Piccadilly Line, and features a narration by one of the survivors of the attacks. The final track on the album, "The Drain", takes its name from the colloquial term for the Waterloo and City line.

The album was successfully funded through Kickstarter in April 2016 and subsequently released worldwide on 28 October 2016.

In May 2017, every piece from the album was remixed by electronic music producer Damion O'Brien, turning the original compositions into a new collection of electronica, ambient house, nu-disco, and drum & bass themed tracks. The project 'Changing Stations: Derailed' was described by Annabelle Carvell of Synaesthesia Magazine as "injecting a new lease of life into the original classical piano compositions, with the tracklisting re-arranged to form a new 'journey' on the London Underground"

== Critical reception ==
Barry Adamson from Piccadilly Records described the album as "a beautiful, and conceptually superb suite of plaintive modern-classical utterances and spoken word narration. Somewhere between the grand, filmic post-rock of This Will Destroy You and the soundtrack work of Adam Wiltzie and Max Richter." Aliya Ismangil of The Mancunion stated the compositions have "a feel of constant frantic energy from the minor pulsing chords under eerie synth sounds, reflecting the haphazard contrasts of the different stations on a line". Sam Liddicott from Music Musings & Such defined the album as "unique and highly illuminating music".

== Track listing ==
All tracks are written by Daniel Liam Glyn and produced by Katie Tavini, except where noted.

No.	Title	Producer(s)	Length
1.	"Monday"	Daniel Liam Glyn; Katie Tavini; Saad Ali^{[a]}	3:29
2.	"Diameter"	Glyn; Tavini	5.52
3.	"Loop"	Glyn; Tavini	5.07
4.	"The Waltz of Lethargy"	Glyn; Tavini; Ali^{[a]}	6:36
5.	"On The Periphery"	Glyn; Tavini	3:51
6.	"Oxymoron"	Glyn; Tavini	3:39
7.	"The Début"	Glyn; Tavini; Ali^{[a]}	4:56
8.	"Abode"	Glyn; Tavini; Ali^{[a]}	6:00
9.	"Melancholy"	Glyn; Tavini; Ali^{[a]}	6:26
10.	"Route C"	Glyn; Tavini	2:40
11.	"The Drain"	Glyn; Tavini; Ali^{[a]}	1:47
Total length:			50:24

Changing Stations: Derailed
No.	Title	Producer	Length
1.	"Abode (Designer Thumbs Return Single Mix)"	Damion O'Brien	4:36
2.	"Oxymoron (Designer Thumbs People In Glass Houses Remix)"	O'Brien	3:50
3.	"Monday (Cassini Division Hope Not Hate Remix)"	O'Brien	3:20
4.	"Diameter (Designer Thumbs Time Tunnel Remix)"	O'Brien	2:57
5.	"Melancholy (Afferent Remix)"	O'Brien	3:59
6.	"The Drain (Designer Thumbs Intercity Remix)"	O'Brien	4:28
7.	"Route C (Designer Thumbs Remix)"	O'Brien	3:02
8.	"The Début (Designer Thumbs Remix)"	O'Brien	4:38
9.	"The Waltz of Lethargy (Designer Thumbs Time Slave Remix)"	O'Brien	6:38
10.	"On The Periphery (Designer Thumbs All Alone Down Here Mix)"	O'Brien	3:50
11.	"Loop (Designer Thumbs Stopped Clock Remix)"	O'Brien	5:24 Notes
Total length:			46:42

- ^{^[a]} signifies an additional producer.

== Personnel ==
Credits adapted from the liner notes of Changing Stations.

Personnel

- Daniel Liam Glyn – composer (all tracks), piano (all tracks), clip recordings, string arrangements (tracks 4, 9), choir arrangements (tracks 1, 9), art direction, visual concept
- Katie Tavini – mastering, producer, recording, audio concept (all tracks)
- Tom Povall – mixing (all tracks)
- Laurie Agnew – percussion (tracks 2, 3, 4, 7, 8, 9, 10)
- Sam Wyatt – art direction
- Lucy Ridges – photography, visual concept
- Heather Renshaw – logo design, photography
- Dom&Ink – illustrations

Additional personnel

- Ordsall Acapella Choir – vocals (tracks 1, 9)
- Bjorn Thomassen – voiceover clip (tracks 2, 4, 10)
- Christopher Lunt – voiceover clip (track 6)
- David Couzens – voiceover clip (track 9)
- James Burrell – voiceover clip (tracks 4, 5)
- Olivia Thomas – voiceover clip (tracks 7, 10)
- Scott Elliott – voiceover clip (tracks 2, 8, 10)
- Sherri Lomas – voiceover clip (tracks 6, 10)
- Vivienne Rudcenko – voiceover clip (tracks 3, 4)
- Will Roberts – voiceover clip (tracks 2, 4)
- Saad Ali – additional production (tracks 1, 4, 7, 8, 9, 11)
- Danny Pheasey – assistant recording engineer (tracks 2, 3, 4, 7, 8, 9, 10)

Changing Stations: Derailed

- Daniel Liam Glyn – composer (all tracks), piano (all tracks), string arrangement (track 4), art direction, visual concept
- Damion O'Brien – producer, mixing (all tracks)
- Katie Tavini – mastering (all tracks)
- Lucy Ridges – photography, visual concept
- Heather Renshaw – art direction, logo design

== Release history ==
Region	Date	Format	Edition	Label
Worldwide	28 October 2016	CD • 2x LP • digital download	Standard	Caravan Boy Records
