= Act V: Hymns with the Devil in Confessional =

Studio album by The Dear Hunter
- Released: September 9, 2016
- Recorded: 2015–2016
- Genre: Progressive rock, indie rock, symphonic rock, experimental rock
- Length: 73:17
- Label: Equal Vision
- Producer: Casey Crescenzo

The Dear Hunter chronology
Act IV: Rebirth in Reprise (2015)	Act V: Hymns with the Devil in Confessional (2016)	All Is As All Should Be (2017)

Professional ratings
Review scores
Source	Rating
AllMusic	4.5/5 stars
PopMatters	9/10 stars

Act V: Hymns with the Devil in Confessional is the seventh studio album by American rock band The Dear Hunter. It was released on September 9, 2016, via Cave and Canary Goods and Equal Vision Records The album is the fifth installment in a six-part series. It follows the conclusion of Act IV: Rebirth in Reprise, in which the story's main character is confronted by his nemesis and forced into blackmail.

== Development ==
Roughly a month prior to the announcement of Act V: Hymns with the Devil in Confessional, Casey Crescenzo began performing a new song entitled "Light" at live shows during the band's early 2016 tour. The song was not accompanied by the full band.

On June 20, 2016, the band mailed out numerous packages to fans who had purchased the "Lifetime" membership in 2010. These lifetime members received a sheet of laminated material in the appearance of a postcard. The postcard had the words "HYMNS WITH THE DEVIL IN CONFESSIONAL" printed across one side, and on the other a message signed by a "Mr. Usher". The postcard also had grooves that could be played on a turntable, revealing a spoken message in relation to the story accompanied by a reprise of the end of the song "City Escape" from Act I: The Lake South, the River North.

The card also contained a URL to the website "hymnswiththedevil.com", which contained a picture of a burnt playing card and a countdown timer set to end on June 22, 2016, at 1:00 pm EDT. At the end of the countdown The Dear Hunter officially announced Act V: Hymns with the Devil in Confessional on their website and via Facebook, Twitter, and Instagram. Preorders for the album, and a new single "Gloria" were made available immediately.

In addition to the announcement of the album, Crescenzo put a personal message on the website. This message discussed his thoughts on his career, the production of Act V and the future of Act VI:

"These two albums, Act IV and V, were written and recorded much in the same time frame – though each album retains its own unique identity, tone, and experience. Act V, however, will be the final ‘rock’ record in the Act series. This may read as though I am abandoning the project, one record early – but the truth is simply that in knowing what Act VI means to the series, and what its story has to say – presenting it in the same form as Acts I-V would be short selling the creative opportunity it presents."

On August 5, a single entitled "The Revival" was released. "Light" was also released as a single on August 25.

== Track listing ==
All tracks are written by Casey Crescenzo

No.	Title	Length
1.	"Regress"	1:22
2.	"The Moon / Awake"	6:09
3.	"Cascade"	5:11
4.	"The Most Cursed of Hands / Who Am I"	6:42
5.	"The Revival"	5:00
6.	"Melpomene"	4:14
7.	"Mr. Usher (On His Way to Town)"	4:59
8.	"The Haves Have Naught"	4:12
9.	"Light"	4:02
10.	"Gloria"	5:16
11.	"The Flame (Is Gone)"	5:40
12.	"The Fire (Remains)"	5:26
13.	"The March"	4:12
14.	"Blood"	4:33
15.	"A Beginning"	6:19
Total length:		73:17

== Personnel ==
- Casey Crescenzo – lead vocals, piano, guitar, acoustic guitar, rhodes, organ, synth, aux. percussion
- Nick Crescenzo – drums, percussion
- Rob Parr – guitar, acoustic guitar, vocals, piano, organ
- Nick Sollecito – bass guitar
- Max Tousseau – guitar, synth

=== Additional personnel ===
- Tivoli Breckenridge – vocals
- Judy Crescenzo – vocals
- Phil Crescenzo – banjo on "The Most Cursed of Hands"
- Gavin Castleton – piano on "Mr. Usher", co-lead vocals on "The Haves Have Naught", additional synth and programming
- Brad Kleyla: trombone on "Mr. Usher"
- Chris Gagnon: alto and tenor sax on "The Revival", "Mr. Usher"
- Ben Shaw: bari sax on "The Revival", "Mr. Usher"
- Manny Mendez: trumpet on "Mr. Usher"

== Charts ==
Chart (2016)	Peak position
US Billboard 200	48
