= The Dear Hunter =

American progressive rock band

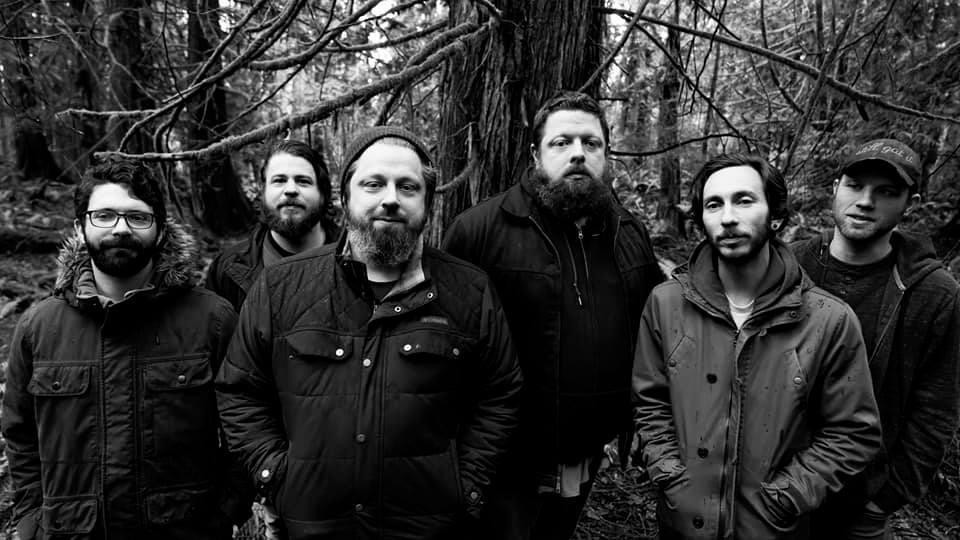
- The Dear Hunter in Port Angeles, Washington From left to right: Nick S, Max, Casey, Nick C, Rob, Gavin

Background information
- Origin: Providence, Rhode Island, U.S.
- Genres: Progressive rock, indie rock, experimental rock, art rock, symphonic rock, baroque pop
- Years active: 2005–present
- Labels: Triple Crown, Cave & Canary Goods
- Spinoff of: The Receiving End of Sirens
- Members: Casey Crescenzo; Nick Crescenzo; Maxwell Tousseau; Nick Sollecito; Robert Parr; Aiden Earley
- Past members: Luke Dent; Sam Dent; Sagan Jacobson; Nate Patterson; Erick Serna; Andy Wildrick; Josh Rheault; Connor Doyle; Andrew Brown; Gavin Castleton
- Website: TheDearHunter.com

The Dear Hunter is an American progressive rock band originating in Providence, Rhode Island. It began as a side project of Casey Crescenzo when he was a member of the Receiving End of Sirens, before becoming his main band in 2006. The band's sound features a wide variety of instruments and styles.

Most of the band's albums up to 2016, starting with their 2006 debut album Act I: The Lake South, the River North, are concept albums and a part of a common storyline. The most recent addition is 2016's Act V: Hymns with the Devil in Confessional, and the Acts are planned to conclude with a sixth installment. The band has also released albums without a common story; The Color Spectrum in 2011, Migrant in 2013, the EP All Is as All Should Be in 2017, Migrant Returned in 2023, and North American EP in 2025. The band is currently working on a new story line, referred to as The Indigo Child, including The Indigo Child EP in 2021, Antimai in 2022, and their latest studio album Sunya, released on March 20, 2026.

== History ==
=== Origins ===
The band began as a side project of Casey Crescenzo when he was a full-time member of the Receiving End of Sirens. The Dear Hunter was originally intended as a vehicle for music Crescenzo had written that did not fit with the sound of the Receiving End of Sirens. Crescenzo affirmed that:

The idea was to take the creative overflow from the Receiving End of Sirens and bottle it up into something that I could keep with me. There was never a plan to take it on the road, or to release it. It was only when things with them went awry that I was given the opportunity to really make it into a traditional sort of thing.

In the winter of 2005 Crescenzo recorded the Dear Ms. Leading demos. He created 10 copies on burned CDs that were circulated among his friends and posted online for download. While elements and characters featured on the demos would reappear on the subsequent Acts, Crescenzo has confirmed that there was a transformation in how he represented these themes and persons; while the story had its origins in his personal life, the Acts removed most autobiographical elements in favor of fiction:

The reason I originally wrote it is obviously because I was bitter. The demos were almost all thematically interchangeable with one another. They are all kind of bitter and about a guy falling in love with a prostitute and stuff. When people call those demos an album, I just think it is a little ridiculous, because if I was to release that, I would be ashamed of myself. There is nothing to it – it's just one subject. I went through something with a girl, and like most immature artist people, you write about it and complain a lot...And that is why I didn't want anyone to hear those (songs from the demo)...I think I did what any writer does – they include themselves in their work to an extent as much as they can, since that is your only real link to humanity – what you experience. So if I am going to try to make anything realistic, all I have to go on is what I learned on my own...It is more that every character is a collection of experiences and feelings I have had about people in the past.

=== Act I: The Lake South, The River North (2007) ===
In May 2006, Crescenzo was "asked to leave" the Receiving End of Sirens and began working on the Dear Hunter's first studio album. He expanded the scope of the project to a six-album story set at the dawn of the 20th century. The story revolved around the birth, life, and abrupt death of a boy known only as "the Dear Hunter". Crescenzo has remarked that the protagonist is "not a hero at all" and that he doesn't do "a single good thing or smart thing in any of the stories". As Crescenzo summarized,

The story begins with the birth of the main character. The first act is really about the relationship of the mother and son, and what she has to go through to keep him alive and thriving. She decides to raise him removed from harsh realities, and tries to abandon her life as well- but her selflessness soon turns her back to old habits, and she ruins herself for him.

For Crescenzo, the decision to begin the story at the beginning of the 20th century was consciously chosen due to the events that would unfold in future acts:

I think the reason I wanted it to be set in that time because as the story goes on, things will coincide with world events where starting at that point is really important. The architecture of the time, the colors – all of that influences the songs, but at the same time, it is not supposed to be anything beyond fiction. It is supposed to be surreal – it is not like I am writing a concept album about some prostitute that I read a book about.

In a 2007 interview, Crescenzo stated at that time that he had the overall story of the Dear Hunter mapped out. He produced and recorded the EP by himself with the assistance of his brother on drums and mother on backing vocals. Act I: The Lake South, The River North was released in September 2006 on Triple Crown Records.

Shortly after the release of Act I, Crescenzo recruited Luke Dent of the recently split band Faraway for vocals and keyboards and Erick Serna as a second guitarist. Luke brought in his brother Sam on drums and Erick brought long-time friend Josh Rheault in to play bass. The band entered the studio in late 2006 to record the follow-up to Act I. Recording finished in early 2007, during which time, the band was featured in Alternative Press's "100 Bands You Need to Know in 2007."

=== Act II: The Meaning of, and All Things Regarding Ms. Leading (2007) ===
Act II: The Meaning of, and All Things Regarding Ms. Leading was released May 22, 2007. Originally, the band had written almost 2 hours of music for the album, but managed to trim the run time down to 80 minutes so as to fit on a single compact disc. Act II reached No. 39 on the Billboard Heatseekers chart. The band supported the album by touring with As Tall As Lions, Saves the Day, Say Anything, Thrice, Chris Conley, The Format, Scary Kids Scaring Kids, Boys Night Out, Circa Survive, Ours, and Fear Before the March of Flames.

The band filmed a music video for the song "The Church and the Dime". A book based on the story of Act II was released as part of the deluxe edition of Act III: Life and Death. Artist Kent St. John was selected to do the illustrations.

Prior to a string of dates with Circa Survive, Josh Rheault and brothers Sam and Luke Dent left the band. Temporary replacements for the tour dates included Cliff Sarcona and Julio Tavarez of As Tall As Lions (drums and bass, respectively), Christopher Tagliaferro of Tiger Riot (bass), and Andy Wildrick of The Junior Varsity (guitar/keys). Wildrick later joined the band as a permanent member, along with Sagan Jacobson of Crown Atlantic on bass and Crescenzo's brother Nick on drums.

The Dear Hunter embarked on their first headlining tour in mid-2008 with Lydia, Eye Alaska, and You, Me, and Everyone We Know. On December 9, 2008, it was announced that Nate Patterson, Crescenzo's former bandmate in The Receiving End of Sirens, would begin playing bass for the band, as Sagan Jacobson had left.

=== Act III: Life and Death (2009) ===
After the headlining tour, the Dear Hunter entered the studio to record Act III: Life and Death. During this time, former bassist Josh Rheault announced on tour that he had rejoined the Dear Hunter on acoustic guitar, backing vocals, and keyboards. Act III was released on June 23, 2009 on Triple Crown Records.

=== The Color Spectrum (2011) ===
Between the release of Act II and Act III, Crescenzo was also conceiving a multi-album arc related to the color spectrum. On April 23, 2010, Crescenzo announced that the Dear Hunter would take a break from the Acts project to focus on this concept. He also stated that Act IV would most likely not be seen for quite some time. He later announced that the project, titled The Color Spectrum, would consist of nine EPs, each corresponding to a certain color (specifically, Black, Red, Orange, Yellow, Green, Blue, Indigo, Violet and White).

On February 24, 2011, Alternative Press announced the EPs would be released in multiple formats, including a physical CD containing select tracks from each of the EPs. At some point prior to the completion of The Color Spectrum, Josh Rheault and Erick Serna both left the band to pursue their respective musical projects. Subsequent to the release of The Color Spectrum, the Dear Hunter performed the entire three-hour set of EPs in a single show and released it as a DVD, entitled The Color Spectrum DVD.

=== Migrant (2013) ===
The Dear Hunter went in to the studio in 2012 with producer Mike Watts to record Migrant, the first album under Crescenzo's new imprint label, Cave & Canary Goods, which is a unit of Equal Vision Records. Prior to recording the album, Crescenzo expressed his excitement over working with Watts and further noted that

I don't know what the listening public will think, and the last thing I want to do is make any declarations in an attempt to influence the listener. What I can say, is that I haven't been more happy, or felt more creative in years, and I am truly anxious to push myself, and my music, to places I still haven't ventured, and to create the best possible album I can.

Migrant represents another deferral of the next Act record, a consideration that Crescenzo weighed before moving forward.

Migrant, which is the first album released by the Dear Hunter that does not have a concept, was released on April 2, 2013. Crescenzo remarked that the non-conceptual nature of Migrant presented a new challenge: "I've been in the rhythm of writing conceptually. It’s a challenge for me to be more transparent and more honest and more directly from the heart and not filtering it through something. So I think that was really exciting; it was really refreshing." Remarking on the less rock-oriented and relatively streamlined nature of Migrant, Crescenzo noted that:

Ninety-nine percent of it (Migrant) was written on piano, so I think it felt right to keep that a focal point. But also, I think, it was a conscious decision to make it a slightly more stripped-down record, as far as the scope and the grandeur goes. The idea was to keep the tone in general a little bit smaller with not so many doubles and big rock guitar and heavy spots on the record...with the lyrics of this new record being transparently about myself, I think it was important to not dehumanize the performances by over-layering them or over-doubling them. As you double vocals, they lose their intimate inflection, and whatever transparent emotion that's trying to be conveyed in them is washed out, which can be a good thing. For this record, I think it was important not to do that.

=== Act IV: Rebirth in Reprise (2015) ===
On March 3, 2015, Crescenzo announced that Act IV: Rebirth in Reprise was well underway and should be released by the end of 2015. This was announced in conjunction with the Dear Hunter's live album that was released the same day. The live album, The Dear Hunter – Live, features songs from the string quartet tour from mid-2013.

On June 16, the single "A Night on the Town" became available for streaming on the band's official website, and the album became available for preorder. On the preorder form, the release date of the album was said to be September 4, 2015. The album debuted at No. 39 on the Billboard 200 selling approximately 7,000 copies, both career highs for the band. The Dear Hunter then embarked on a Fall US Tour with bands CHON and Gates.

=== Act V: Hymns with the Devil in Confessional (2016) ===
On June 22, 2016, Crescenzo announced via Facebook that Act V: Hymns with the Devil in Confessional was set for a September 9, 2016 release. The album debuted at No. 48 on the US Billboard 200 and No. 6 on the Independent Albums chart, becoming their 2nd best charting success so far. The band embarked on a month-long North American tour with Gavin Castleton and Eisley in late September, finishing with a show in San Francisco accompanied by Awesöme Orchestra. The show focused mainly on Act IV and V and a few tracks off the first Acts. In an interview with Pop Matters, Crescenzo announced the next Dear Hunter record will be unrelated to the Acts.

=== All Is as All Should Be (2017) ===
On September 12, 2017, the Dear Hunter announced a headlining tour with The Family Crest and VAVÁ. On September 13, the Dear Hunter announced a six track EP titled All Is as All Should Be. It was released on December 1, 2017 through Cave And Canary Goods.

=== The Fox and the Hunt (2020) ===
On February 14, 2020, the Dear Hunter released an orchestral LP in collaboration with composer Brian Adam McCune and San Francisco-based group Awesöme Orchestra through Cave and Canary Goods. The Fox and the Hunt repurposes and expands upon orchestral parts recorded for Act IV and Act V into a fully realized instrumental album.

=== Departure of Castleton, The Indigo Child, and S.S. Neverender (2021) ===
On June 12, 2021, Gavin Castleton announced his departure from the band via their Pillar account (a subscription-based online community in which the band actively participates). Castleton cited being at a point in his life that he cannot "[contribute] the appropriate time, energy and focus" that the "many amazing and ambitious TDH events and releases" would require. He also stated these events and releases were "on the near horizon". The band wished Castleton well in the same post.

On October 13, 2021, the Dear Hunter announced an upcoming event for their next release "The Indigo Child" set for October 22, 2021, on their Instagram and Facebook pages.

On October 22, 2021, the band released The Indigo Child EP, consisting of orchestral works based on their short film of the same name, and the future concept album saga.

On October 25–29, 2021, the Dear Hunter (along with touring keyboardist Aiden Earley) took part on the S.S. Neverender cruise along with Coheed and Cambria.

=== Antimai, Sunya (2022–present) ===
On February 4, 2022, the Dear Hunter announced an upcoming American tour with special guests The World Is a Beautiful Place & I Am No Longer Afraid to Die and Tanner Merritt of O'Brother.

On July 1, 2022, they released their eighth studio album Antimai through Cave and Canary. The album is the first record in the band's sci-fi/fantasy-themed "Indigo Child" saga, introducing the titular city and its geographical and social structure on a fictional world.

Prior to the release of Sunya, the band teased concept art of Antimai's rings every few days on Instagram. This led to an alternate reality game (ARG) that was released on January 31, 2026. Among the many puzzles and teasers was a 20-day countdown, which ended on February 20, 2026, when they released a new single entitled "The Glass Desert I - Giants". The song is from their upcoming album, Sunya, which released March 20, 2026. After the release of this video the ARG was continually updated, expanding on the worldbuilding of Antimai and leading to the release of another single, "Marauders".

== Members ==
Current

- Casey Crescenzo – lead vocals, guitar, organ (2004–present), bass (2004–2007, 2010–2011)
- Nick Crescenzo – drums, percussion, backing vocals (2006, 2007–present)
- Maxwell Tousseau – guitar, keyboards, percussion, backing vocals (2010–present)
- Robert Parr – guitar, keyboards, backing vocals (2011–present)
- Nick Sollecito – bass (2011–present)
- Aiden Earley - guitar, keyboards (2021-present; touring)

Former

- Erick Serna – guitar, backing vocals (2006–2011)
- Luke Dent – keyboard, guitar, percussion, backing vocals (2006–2007)
- Sam Dent – drums (2006–2007)
- Josh Rheault – guitar, keyboards, backing vocals (2007, 2009–2011)
- Andy Wildrick – guitar, keyboards, backing vocals (2007–2010)
- Sagan Jacobson – bass, backing vocals (2007–2008)
- Nate Patterson – bass, backing vocals (2008–2010)
- Connor Doyle – guitar, backing vocals (2010–2013)
- Andrew Brown – keyboards, backing vocals (2015–2016)
- Gavin Castleton – keyboards, backing vocals (2016–2021)

Timeline

== Discography ==
=== Demos ===
- Dear Ms. Leading (2004)
- The Matchstick Demos (2016)

=== Studio albums ===
- Act I: The Lake South, the River North (2006)
- Act II: The Meaning of, and All Things Regarding Ms. Leading (2007)
- Act III: Life and Death (2009)
- The Color Spectrum (2011)
- Migrant (2013)
- Act IV: Rebirth in Reprise (2015)
- Act V: Hymns with the Devil in Confessional (2016)
- Antimai (2022)
- Sunya (2026)

=== Live ===
- The Color Spectrum – Live (2013)
- The Dear Hunter – Live (2015)
- Act I: The Lake South, The River North (Live from Seattle, WA) (2023)
- Act II: The Meaning of, and All Things Regarding Ms. Leading (Live from Seattle, WA) (2024)
- Act III: Life and Death (Live from Port Angeles, WA) (2024)

=== EPs ===
- Random EP #1 (2007)
- Random EP #2 (2008)
- The Branches EP (2010)
- Black EP (2011)
- Red EP (2011)
- Orange EP (2011)
- Yellow EP (2011)
- Green EP (2011)
- Blue EP (2011)
- Indigo EP (2011)
- Violet EP (2011)
- White EP (2011)
- The Migrations Annex (2013)
- All Is as All Should Be (2017)
- The Indigo Child (2021)
- North American EP (2025)

=== Other ===
- The Fox and the Hunt (orchestral LP performed by Awesöme Orchestra, 2020)
- Migrant Returned ("reimagining" of Migrant, 2023)
