= Act II: The Meaning of, and All Things Regarding Ms. Leading =

Studio album by The Dear Hunter
- Released: May 22, 2007
- Recorded: 2006–07
- Genres: Progressive rock, indie rock, experimental rock
- Length: 76:56
- Label: Triple Crown
- Producer: Casey Crescenzo

The Dear Hunter chronology
Act I: The Lake South, The River North (2006)	Act II: The Meaning of, and All Things Regarding Ms. Leading (2007)	Random EP #1 (2007)

Professional ratings
Review scores
Source	Rating
AbsolutePunk	(93%)
Allmusic	3.5/5 stars
Impakte Magazine	9/10 stars

Act II: The Meaning of, and All Things Regarding Ms. Leading is the second studio album by American progressive rock band The Dear Hunter, released on May 22, 2007 through Triple Crown Records.

The album is the second part of a six-act story. Act II begins with the death of the eponymous main character's mother, Ms. Terri. Following her death, he travels to a nearby brothel in the hopes of learning more about his mother and the life she lived as a prostitute, as he himself was the product of her profession. He eventually finds love in a prostitute named Ms. Leading, but the relationship eventually falls apart due to his inability to cope with her chosen profession.

According to an interview with Casey Crescenzo for music website AbsolutePunk, the band wrote 120 minutes' worth of music for the album, but managed to trim it down to just under 80 minutes to avoid having to do a double-disc release.

The album features numerous re-recorded tracks from the Dear Ms. Leading demos. Although Casey based much of the demo's lyrics on personal experiences, he has stated that the arc of falling in love with a prostitute is not based on any experience he's actually had.

In June 2007, artist Kent St. John was selected to illustrate a book based on the story of Act II. The progress of his contributions can be seen at his personal blog.

== Track listing ==
All tracks are written by Casey Crescenzo.

No.	Title	Length
1.	"The Death and the Berth"	0:38
2.	"The Procession"	4:59
3.	"The Lake and the River" (9:49 on digital versions)	9:29
4.	"The Oracles on the Delphi Express"	4:18
5.	"The Church and the Dime" (4:43 on digital versions)	4:57
6.	"The Bitter Suite I and II: Meeting Ms. Leading and Through the Dime"	6:06
7.	"The Bitter Suite III: Embrace"	7:46
8.	"Smiling Swine"	4:45
9.	"Evicted"	3:44
10.	"Blood of the Rose"	3:48
11.	"Red Hands"	6:07
12.	"Where the Road Parts"	4:29
13.	"Dear Ms. Leading"	4:28
14.	"Black Sandy Beaches"	4:13
15.	"Vital Vessels Vindicate" (7:42 on digital versions)	7:09
Total length:		76:56

- Track 9 and tracks 11–14 originally appeared on Dear Ms. Leading.

== Personnel ==
- Casey Crescenzo – Vocals, Guitar, Bass, Keyboards, Organ
- Luke Dent – Piano, Organ, Vocals
- Sam Dent – Drums, Percussion, Glockenspiel
- Erick Serna – Acoustic and Electric Guitar

=== Additional personnel ===
- Phil Crescenzo – Banjo
- Matt Tobin – Violin
- Philip Wolf – Cello
- Jason Belcher – Trumpet, French horn
- Krysten Keches – Harp
- Brandon Brooks – Cello
