= Gates (band) =

- Origin: New Brunswick, New Jersey
- Genres: Post-rock; post-hardcore; indie rock; emo
- Years active: 2011–present
- Label: Pure Noise Records
- Spinoff of: Lydia, Bears & Bright Lights
- Members: Kevin Ann Dye; Dan King; Mike Maroney; Daniel Crapanzano; Ethan Koozer
- Website: www.gatesnj.com

Gates (stylized as gates) is a five-piece American post rock band from New Brunswick, New Jersey, which consists of Kevin Ann Dye (vocals/guitars), Dan King (guitars), Mike Maroney (bass), Ethan Koozer (guitars) and Daniel Crapanzano (drums). They have released two albums and three EPs.

== Career ==
Gates formed in 2011 while the various band members had settled in New Jersey. Koozer (ex Lydia), moved from Arizona while King, Maroney and Crapanzano were in the band Bears & Bright Lights. Koozer joined the band and Dye replaced the original singer, prompting the name change to Gates. Originally from Michigan, Dye moved to Brooklyn in 2010 after earning a degree in Telecommunication, Information Studies and Media. She interned at a number of studios, including Levon Helm Studios under the tutelage of Justin Guip. In 2011 they self-released debut EP titled The Sun Will Rise And Lead Me Home. The following year they released their second self-released EP titled You Are All You Have Left To Fear. Both recordings were produced and engineered by Dye.

In 2012 their six-track debut EP was re-released on vinyl by Devildance Records. On April 30, 2013, Gates signed to Pure Noise Records. Their second EP was remixed by Mike Watts and re-released in the fall of 2013 via Pure Noise Records. In April 2014 Gates announced they were supporting Have Mercy and Pentimento on their co-headlining tour. They also supported The Gaslight Anthem in the same year, and embarked on their first UK tour with Fallacies.

In September 2014, Gates premiered a new song titled "Low" from their first full-length album. In September, the band released another song from the album titled "Not My Blood" and premiered "Born Dead" via Alternative Press. Bloom & Breathe was released on October 21, 2014, via Pure Noise Records. It was recorded at VuDu Studios and produced by Mike Watts and Kevin Ann Dye. In February 2016 the band release a split 7-inch with Matthew Pryor that featured the song "Captive".

In April 2016, the band debuted a music video for their new song, "Habit". The track comes from their second release, Parallel Lives on Pure Noise Records that appeared on June 3, 2016. As opposed to the previous record, Dye began using a piano and a sampler to develop songs such as "Color Worn". On alreadyheard.com the album was described as an "airy and ethereal listen". As with the previous effort, it was co-produced by Dye and Mike Watts and recorded at VuDu studios.

== Musical style and influences ==
Gates have cited the Appleseed Cast, Jimmy Eat World, and Elliott as influences. For the first two EPs and Bloom & Breathe the band worked on arrangements before Dye would add her lyrics. She noted that she found the lyric writing process for the first album " very difficult and frustrating". On the second record she largely wrote songs on an acoustic guitar where majority of the lyrics had already been written.

== Discography ==
Studio albums

- Bloom & Breathe (2014)
- Parallel Lives (2016)

EPs

- The Sun Will Rise and Lead Me Home (2011)
- You Are All You Have Left to Fear (2012)
- Here and Now (2021)
