= Act IV: Rebirth in Reprise =

Act IV: Rebirth In Reprise

Studio album by The Dear Hunter
- Released: September 4, 2015
- Recorded: 2015
- Genres: Progressive rock, indie rock, symphonic rock, experimental rock
- Length: 74:24
- Label: Equal Vision
- Producer: Casey Crescenzo

The Dear Hunter chronology
Migrant (2013)	Act IV: Rebirth In Reprise (2015)	Act V: Hymns with the Devil in Confessional (2016)

Professional ratings
Aggregate scores
Source	Rating
Metacritic	79/100
Review scores
Source	Rating
AllMusic	4/5 stars
Alternative Press	4/5 stars
Consequence Of Sound	B−
PopMatters	9/10 stars
PunkNews.org	3/5 stars
Sputnikmusic	4.5/5 stars

Act IV: Rebirth In Reprise is the sixth studio album by American rock band The Dear Hunter, and was released on September 4, 2015, through Equal Vision Records. The album is the fourth part in a six-act story. The story follows the conclusion of Act III: Life and Death, in which the protagonist assumes the identity of his deceased half-brother after the resolution of the First World War.

== Development ==
On March 3, 2015, Casey Crescenzo made an announcement on The Dear Hunter website that Act IV: Rebirth in Reprise was in development.

"I wanted to surprise our fans with this release, as it is my gift to you all, for supporting me over the years, and never giving up on me. Thank you, from the bottom of my heart, for your continued faith in The Dear Hunter. I want to humbly ask you all to share this letter. Word of mouth has always been the lifeblood of this music, and the suggestions of good friends always outweigh a well placed banner ad. I leave you all now, scurrying back into my cave with my nose to the grindstone, preparing the next record for The Dear Hunter… It is coming along swimmingly, and I can't wait to share it with you all. Please keep your eyes peeled for Act IV: Rebirth in Reprise, coming later this year."

On April 7, 2015, Casey began putting videos on YouTube regarding The Dear Hunter's 2015 Act II and III tour. These videos also contained teasers for Act IV. He released eight videos, with the last video being uploaded April 24.

On June 16, the single "A Night on the Town" became available for streaming on the band's official website, and the album became available for preorder.

On July 8, The Dear Hunter announced their forthcoming single "Waves", which was released the following day.

Another single entitled "Wait" was released almost a month later, August 7

The album debuted at No. 39 on the Billboard 200 selling approximately 7,000 copies – both figures are career-highs for the band.

== Track listing ==
All tracks are written by Casey Crescenzo

No.	Title	Length
1.	"Rebirth"	2:51
2.	"The Old Haunt"	4:36
3.	"Waves"	4:12
4.	"At the End of the Earth"	5:16
5.	"Remembered"	3:50
6.	"A Night on the Town"	9:00
7.	"Is There Anybody Here?"	6:42
8.	"The Squeaky Wheel"	4:35
9.	"The Bitter Suite IV and V: The Congregation and the Sermon in the Silt"	5:40
10.	"The Bitter Suite VI: Abandon"	5:32
11.	"King of Swords (Reversed)"	5:07
12.	"If All Goes Well"	4:41
13.	"The Line"	3:37
14.	"Wait"	3:20
15.	"Ouroboros"	5:25
Total length:		74:24

== Personnel ==
The Dear Hunter

- Casey Crescenzo – lead vocals, piano, guitar, acoustic guitar, rhodes, organ, synth, aux. percussion
- Nick Crescenzo – drums, percussion
- Rob Parr – guitar, acoustic guitar, vocals, piano, organ
- Nick Sollecito – bass guitar
- Max Tousseau – guitar, synth

Additional musicians

- Judy Crescenzo – additional vocals
- Tivoli Breckenridge – additional vocals

Production

- Casey Crescenzo – producer, engineer
- Nick Crescenzo, Max Tousseau, Phil Crescenzo – additional engineering
- Mike Watts – mixing engineer
- Fesse Nichols – recording engineer
- Jason Butler – assistant engineer
- Brian Adam McCune – music preparation
- Kevin Pereira – commissioned all orchestral tracks
- Nicky Barkla – album art
- Joel Kanitz – album layout & design
- Francesca Caldara, Dan Sandshaw – A&R
- Recorded in Port Angeles, WA
- Orchestral tracks recorded on 4, 7, 10, January 11, 2015, at Fantasy Studios, Berkeley, CA

Orchestra

- Casey Crescenzo – orchestrations
- Brian Adam McCune – additional orchestrations
- Featuring members of Awesöme Orchestra
  - David Möschler – conductor/music director
  - Jenny Hanson – flute
  - Arturo Rodriguez – piccolo
  - Ashley Ertz, Sue Crum – oboe
  - James Pytko, Carolyn Walter – clarinet
  - Scott Alexander – bassoon
  - Kris King – contrabassoon
  - Jon Betts, Heidi Trefethen, Phil Hobson, Nick Carnes – horn
  - Harlow Carpenter, Michael Cox, Justin Smith – trumpet
  - Allison Gomer, Bruce Colman – trombone
  - Jeremy Carrillo – bass trombone
  - Robinson Love – tuba
  - Lily Sevier – timpani, percussion
  - Liza Wallace – harp
  - Ishtar Hernandez, Laura Shifley, Ann Eastman, Shaina Evoniuk, Lucy Giraldo, Moses Lei – violin
  - Christina Owens, Christina Lesicko, Alice Eastman – viola
  - Sam Leachman, Karen Hsu, Kane Suga, Cindy Hickox – cello
  - Travis Kindred, Amanda Wu, Alex Van Gils – double bass

String quartet on "Waves" and "Is There Anybody Here"

== Charts ==
Chart (2015)	Peak position
US Billboard 200	39
