= Act I: The Lake South, the River North =

Album by the Dear Hunter

Studio album by the Dear Hunter
- Released: September 26, 2006
- Recorded: 2006 at Rockit Studios (Long Island, NY)
- Genre: Progressive rock; experimental rock; indie rock
- Length: 38:26
- Label: Triple Crown
- Producer: Casey Crescenzo

The Dear Hunter chronology
| Dear Ms. Leading (2005) | Act I: The Lake South, the River North (2006) | Act II: The Meaning of, and All Things Regarding Ms. Leading (2007) |

Professional ratings
Review scores
| Source | Rating |
|---|---|
| AbsolutePunk | (88%) |

Act I: The Lake South, the River North is the debut studio album by the Dear Hunter. It was released on September 26, 2006, on Triple Crown Records. It was mixed by Claude Zdanow.

The album is the first part of a six-act story. Act I is about the conception, birth, and childhood of the main character—known only as The Dear Hunter or "The Boy"—to a prostitute named Ms. Terri.

== Track listing ==
All tracks are written by Casey Crescenzo

| No. | Title | Length |
|---|---|---|
| 1. | "Battesimo del Fuoco" | 1:55 |
| 2. | "The Lake South" | 1:43 |
| 3. | "City Escape" | 5:54 |
| 4. | "The Inquiry of Ms. Terri" | 5:55 |
| 5. | "1878" | 7:01 |
| 6. | "The Pimp and the Priest" | 5:58 |
| 7. | "His Hands Matched His Tongue" | 5:58 |
| 8. | "The River North" | 4:02 |
| Total length: | | 38:26 |

== Personnel ==
- Casey Crescenzo – vocals, guitar, bass, piano, organ, percussion, programming, production, engineering, mixing, mastering
- Nick Crescenzo – drums

=== Additional personnel ===
- Judy Crescenzo – additional vocals on "City Escape" and "The Inquiry of Ms. Terri"
- Phil Crescenzo – organ on "1878"
- Dan Nigro – additional vocals on "1878"
- Tom Neeson – trumpet
- Andrew Borstein – trombone
- Ryan Muir – trumpet, French horn
