= Falls =

Falls may refer to:

== Places ==
- Waterfalls or rapids
- Falls, North Carolina, USA
- Falls, West Virginia, USA

== Other uses ==
- The ropes or wires, fed through davits, that are used to secure and lower a ship's lifeboats.
- Falls (surname)
- The sepals of the Iris flower
- Falls in older adults

== See also ==
- Meteorite falls
- Belfast Falls (disambiguation)
  - Falls Road, Belfast in Belfast, Northern Ireland
  - Belfast Falls (Northern Ireland Parliament constituency)
  - Belfast Falls (UK Parliament constituency)
- Falls Festival
- Blood Falls, an outflow of an iron oxide tainted plume of melting salty water occurring at the Taylor Glacier in the McMurdo Dry Valleys in Antarctica
- Falls Airport (disambiguation)
- Falls City (disambiguation)
- Falls Creek (disambiguation)
- Falls River (disambiguation)
- Falls Township (disambiguation)
- The Falls (disambiguation)
- Fall (disambiguation)
- The Fall (disambiguation)
- Falling (disambiguation)
- Fals (disambiguation)
