= The Fall =

The Fall most often refers to:

- The fall of man in Abrahamic religions

The Fall may also refer to:

== Comics and games ==
- Assassin's Creed: The Fall (2010–11) a comic tie-in to the game series
- Deus Ex: The Fall (2013), an iOS game
- The Fall (video game) (2014)
- The Fall: Last Days of Gaia (2004), a role-playing game

== Film and television ==
- The Fall (1969 film), a documentary film by Peter Whitehead
- The Fall (1999 film), a thriller directed by Andrew Piddington
- The Fall (2006 film), a fantasy film by Tarsem Singh
- The Fall (2008 film), an independent crime film
- The Fall (TV series), a British-Irish TV series

== Literature ==
- The Fall (Camus novel) (1956)
- The Fall (del Toro and Hogan novel), part of The Strain trilogy
- The Fall (Muchamore novel), part of the CHERUB series
- The Fall (Nix novel), part of The Seventh Tower series
- The Fall (Star Trek novels)

== Music ==
=== Albums ===
- The Fall, 1997, by King James
- The Fall, 2001, by Cesium 137
- The Fall (Norah Jones album), 2009
- The Fall (Gorillaz album), 2010
- The Fall, a 2014 mixtape by XXXTentacion
- The Fall, a 2014 extended play by Ritual
- The Fall, a 2019 extended play by Sarah Kinsley
- The Fall (EP), a 2019 extended play by Dallas Smith
- The Fall, 2024, by Trapt

=== Songs ===
- "The Fall" (Ministry song), 1996
- "The Fall" (Brendan James song), 2010
- "The Fall" (Cody Johnson song), 2024
- "The Fall", by Electric Light Orchestra, from the 1980 film Xanadu
- "The Fall", by A Flock of Seagulls, from the 1983 album Listen
- "The Fall", by Beat Happening, from the 1985 album Beat Happening
- "The Fall", by Nomeansno, from the 1991 album 0 + 2 = 1
- "The Fall", by Bright from the 2000 album Full Negative (or) Breaks
- "The Fall", by Way Out West, from the 2001 album Intensify
- "The Fall", by The Protomen, from the 2009 album Act II: The Father of Death
- "The Fall", by Gary Numan, from the 2011 album Dead Son Rising
- "The Fall", by The Weeknd, from the 2011 mixtape Echoes of Silence
- "The Fall", by Rhye, from the 2013 album Woman
- "The Fall", by Imagine Dragons from the 2015 album Smoke + Mirrors
- "The Fall", by Markus Feehily from the 2015 album Fire
- "The Fall", a 2016 single from Bryce Vine
- "The Fall", by Dallas Smith from the 2020 album Timeless
- "The Fall", by Lovejoy from the 2021 EP Pebble Brain

=== Performers ===
- The Fall (band)

== See also ==
- Fall (disambiguation)
- Fallen (disambiguation)
- Falling (disambiguation)
- Fallout (disambiguation)
- Falls (disambiguation)
- Fell (disambiguation)
- The Falls (disambiguation)
