= WEZR =

WEZR may refer to:

- WEZR (AM), a radio station (780 AM) licensed to serve Rumford, Maine, United States
- WIGY (AM), a radio station (1240 AM) licensed to serve Lewiston, Maine, which held the call sign WEZR from 2007 to 2020
- WIGY-FM, a radio station (100.7 FM) licensed to serve Mexico, Maine, which used the call sign WEZR-FM from September to October 2019
- WOXO-FM, a radio station (92.7 FM) licensed to serve Norway, Maine, which used the call sign WEZR-FM from 2016 to 2019
- WJFK-FM, a radio station (106.7 FM) licensed to serve Manassas, Virginia, United States, which used the call sign WEZR from 1968 to 1985
