= Falling Up =

Falling Up may refer to:

- Falling Up (band), an American Christian rock band, active from 2001–2016
- Falling Up (poetry collection), a 1996 children's poetry book by Shel Silverstein
- Falling Up (film), a 2009 film
- Falling Up, a 2004 album by Digby
- Falling Up (Falling Up album), 2015
- Falling Up (Kevin Ayers album), 1988
- "Falling Up" (Dean Lewis song), 2021
- "Falling Up" (Stray Kids song), 2024

== See also ==
- "Fallin' Up/¿Que Dices?", a 1997 song by the Black Eyed Peas
- Falling Down (disambiguation)
