= WOXO =

WOXO may refer to:

- WOXO-FM, a radio station (92.7 FM) licensed to serve Norway, Maine, United States
- WIGY-FM, a radio station (100.7 FM) licensed to serve Mexico, Maine, which used the call sign WOXO-FM from 2016 to 2019
- WPNO, a radio station (1450 AM) licensed to serve South Paris, Maine, which used the call sign WOXO from 1981 to 1986 and 2016 to 2019
