= WIGY =

WIGY may refer to:

- WIGY (AM), a radio station (1240 AM) licensed to serve Lewiston, Maine, United States
- WIGY-FM, a radio station (100.7 FM) licensed to serve Mexico, Maine
- WEZR (AM), a radio station (780 AM) licensed to serve Rumford, Maine, which held the call sign WIGY in 2020
- WQSK, a radio station (97.5 FM) licensed to serve Madison, Maine, which held the call sign WIGY from 1995 to 2013
- WBCI, a radio station (105.9 FM) licensed to serve Bath, Maine, which held the call sign WIGY from 1976 to 1991
