= Uncle Henry's =

American magazine

- Cover of the April 11–17, 2013 edition
- Frequency: Weekly
- Founder: Henry Faller; Helen Faller
- First issue: 1970 (56 years ago)
- Final issue: November 14, 2024 (18 months ago)
- Country: United States
- Based in: Augusta, Maine, U.S.
- Language: English
- Website: unclehenrys.com

Uncle Henry's is an American online and printed classified advertisements repository, founded by Henry Faller and Helen Faller in Rockland, Maine, and printed in Augusta, Maine, United States.

Established in 1970, Uncle Henry's helps people buy, sell, swap or trade a variety of items. Its tagline is Most Anything Under the Sun. It is published weekly on Thursdays and is priced at $2.00 for the printed edition. In addition to Maine, the printed version is available in New Hampshire, Vermont, Massachusetts and New Brunswick, Canada (where it is $2.25). Digital "satellite" versions are available for download in Georgia and Indiana. Adverts are limited to thirty words. A radio show, named Talkin' Deals, is broadcast on Saturdays via streaming and on the Maine radio stations WLOB, WBAN, WEZR and WPNO.

Uncle Henry's was the inspiration for the reality television programme Down East Dickering, on which it is referred to as the bible.

The magazine announced its final issue will be published on November 14, 2024, because the company that prints it has gone out of business.
