= WTME =

WTME may refer to:

- WTME-LD, a low-power television station (channel 14, virtual 7) licensed to serve Bruce, Mississippi, United States
- WEZR (AM), a radio station (780 AM) licensed to serve Rumford, Maine, United States, which held the call sign WTME from 2001 to 2020
- WIGY (AM), a radio station (1240 AM) licensed to serve Lewiston, Maine, which held the call sign WTME from 1991 to 2001
