= Fall (disambiguation) =

Fall is another name for the season autumn, mainly used in North America.

Fall may also refer to:

- Fall (surname), a surname
- Fall (academic term), usually a semester or a quarter, occurring around the same time as the autumn season
- Free fall, motion in classical mechanics
- Falling (accident), including slipping or tripping

== Films ==
- Fall (1997 film), an American romantic film written by, directed by, and starring Eric Schaeffer
- Fall (2014 film), a Canadian drama film written and directed by Terrance Odette
- Fall (2022 film), an American action-thriller film from Lionsgate

== Music ==
=== Albums ===
- Fall (Jon Foreman EP) (2007)
- Fall (Overlake album) (2017)
- Fall (Ride EP) (1990)
- Fall (Clay Walker album) (2007)
- Fall (Borknagar album) (2025)

=== Songs ===
- "Fall" (Justin Bieber song) (2012)
- "Fall" (Davido song)
- "Fall" (Eminem song)
- "Fall" (Natalia Lesz song)
- "Fall" (Clay Walker song) (2007)
- "Fall", a 2022 song by Big Time Rush
- "Fall", a song by Brandy from Human
- "Fall", a song by Chloe x Halle from Sugar Symphony
- "Fall", a 2005 song by Editors from The Back Room
- "Fall", a 1987 song by the Jesus and Mary Chain from the album Darklands
- "Fall", a song by the Psychedelic Furs from The Psychedelic Furs
- "Fall", a 2018 song by Sasha Alex Sloan from Sad Girl
- "Fall", a 2011 song by the Saturdays from Chasing Lights
- "Fall", a 2000 song by Sevendust from Scream 3: The Album
- "Fall", a 1968 song by Wayne Shorter from Nefertiti
- "Fall", a 2023 song by Sigur Rós from Átta

== Places ==
- Fall, Iran, a village in Fars Province
- Fall (Lenggries), a village in Bavaria (subdivision of Lenggries, Bad Tölz-Wolfratshausen district, Germany)

== Other uses ==
- Fall (nautical term), the part of a rope that is hauled on in a block-and-tackle arrangement
- Fall (unit), a Scottish measurement of length
- Fall; or, Dodge in Hell, a 2019 speculative fiction novel by Neal Stephenson
- Fall (TV series), an Indian web series
- "Fall" (Domina), a 2021 television episode
- "Fall" (Once Upon a Time), an episode of Once Upon a Time
- "Fall" (Better Call Saul), an episode of Better Call Saul
- Fall, the sudden arrival of birds due to drift migration
- Fall, the sepals of the Iris flower

== See also ==
- Astrological fall, a planet in a form of debilitated essential dignity
- The Fall (disambiguation)
- Fall Kill, a creek in New York
- Fallen (disambiguation)
- Falling (disambiguation)
- Falling Down (disambiguation)
- Fallout (disambiguation)
- Falls (disambiguation)
- The Falls (disambiguation)
- Fell (disambiguation)
- Meteorite fall, a meteorite recovered after being observed entering the atmosphere
- Phall, a very hot curry dish
- Pin fall and related terms, jargon in the sport of wrestling
- Waterfall
