= Hours (The Machine De Ella Project) =

2013 album by Falling Up

Studio album by Falling Up
- Released: July 15, 2013
- Recorded: October 9, 2012 – February 19, 2013
- Genre: Experimental rock, Christian rock, art rock
- Length: 70:50
- Label: Independent
- Producer: Jessy Ribordy

Falling Up chronology
| Mnemos EP (2011) | Hours (2013) | Silver City EP (2013) |

Hours is a 2013 concept album recorded by experimental Christian rock band Falling Up. It is part of the Machine De Ella project, which includes a novel, also entitled Hours, written by lead-singer and producer, Jessy Ribordy. The project also includes their album Midnight on Earthship. Hours, along with Midnight on Earthship, is Falling Up's sixth/seventh studio album. It was released over a period of time, having started on October 9, 2012, and concluded on February 19, 2013. A new song was released every two weeks for approximately four months until all twelve tracks were digitally released to the Machine De Ella members. It is the first Falling Up album to feature Nick Lambert, who had previously worked as a session guitarist on Your Sparkling Death Cometh.

"Hours" original artwork

In order to fund the creation of physical copies of both Hours and Midnight on Earthship, Falling Up launched a KickStarter. One of the bonus rewards for the funding reaching $1,000 over the minimum requirement was that an additional song would be recorded. Falling Up stated that the new song had already been written, and would be "making some interesting new connections between the story of Hours and Fangs!" The funding was reached and exceeded the minimum amount by $2,340.

The album's official release came on July 15, 2013, where the physical and digital albums went up for sale on Falling Up's official website, iTunes, and other retailers.

For the album's release, the cover artwork was re-created. The final version was designed by artist Nick Wiinikka, and was designed to mimic the cover of a vinyl record.

== Reception ==
Professional ratings
Review scores
| Source | Rating |
|---|---|
| Jesus Freak Hideout | 4.5/5 stars |
| New Release Tuesday | 4.5/5 stars |

Hours was generally released to very favorable reviews from critics. The album was cited as being an incredibly unique and creative album, with Jesus Freak Hideout's Nathaniel Schexnayder calling the album "outstanding" and noting that "Hours features the band's finest, most innovative work to date". New Release Tuesday stated that "beautiful lyrics and expertly crafted sounds makes this one of the best Falling Up albums yet".

== Track listing ==
All tracks are written by Jessy Ribordy

Album release
| No. | Title | Length |
|---|---|---|
| 1. | "The Contract" | 3:59 |
| 2. | "The Climb" | 6:10 |
| 3. | "Finn Hatches a Plan" | 5:37 |
| 4. | "The Rest Will Soon Follow" | 4:59 |
| 5. | "Aeva and the Waving World" | 6:01 |
| 6. | "On Growing Things" | 6:04 |
| 7. | "Intro to the Radio Room" | 5:48 |
| 8. | "The Outsider" | 5:21 |
| 9. | "Blue Ruins" | 5:10 |
| 10. | "Transmission" | 5:36 |
| 11. | "Prillicians" | 4:49 |
| 12. | "In Echoes Forever" | 4:31 |
| 13. | "The Station" | 6:42 |
| Total length: | | 70:50 |

== Credits ==
Falling Up

- Jessy Ribordy — lead vocals, guitar, keyboards, programming
- Daniel Elder — guitar
- Nick Lambert — guitar
- Jeremy Miller — bass guitar, keyboards
- Josh Shroy — drums, percussion

Additional personnel

- Bethany Grace Lomas - additional vocals on track 7
- Sam Pullman - violin
- Olivia White - cello
- Jeremy Wheaton – euphonium on tracks 6 and 12
- Nick Wiinikka - illustration, design and layout
- Tracked and engineered at Osiander Music Studio in Portland, Oregon
