= Falen =

Falen may refer to:

- Falen Gherebi (born 1961), a Libyan held by the Americans in Guantanamo
- Falen Johnson, a Mohawk and Tuscarora from Six Nations of the Grand River enclaved in Canada; a playwright
- James E. Falen, an American professor of Russian
- Lake Fälen, Alpstein, Appenzell Innerrhoden, Switzerland; a mountain lake

== See also ==
- Carel van Falens (1683–1733) Flemish artist
- Phalen
- Fallen (disambiguation)
- Fale (disambiguation)
- FAL (disambiguation)
