= Overlake =

Overlake can refer to:

- Overlake, Washington
- Overlake (band)
