= Falls (surname) =

Falls is a surname. Notable people with the surname include:

- Charles Buckles Falls (1874-1960), American artist and illustrator
- Colin Falls (born 1985), American basketball player
- Cyril Falls (1888–1971), British military historian
- Joe Falls (1928–2004), American journalist
- Kat Falls (born 1964), American science fiction writer
- Kevin Falls, American television writer
- Mike Falls (born 1934), American football player
- Robert Falls (born 1954), American theatre director
- Robert Hilborn Falls (1924–2009), Canadian Chief of Defence Staff

== See also ==
- Fall (surname)
