= WCXX =

WCXX may refer to:

- WCXX (FM), a radio station (102.3 FM) licensed to serve Madawaska, Maine, United States
- WCXX-LP, a low-power radio station (105.5 FM) licensed to serve Cincinnati, Ohio, United States
