= Fallin =

Fallin may refer to:

== People with the surname ==
- Ken Fallin (born 1948), American illustrator and caricaturist
- Mary Fallin (born 1954), American politician, 27th governor of Oklahoma from 2011 to 2019
- Christina Fallin (born 1987), American lobbyist and singer, daughter of former Oklahoma Governor Mary Fallin

== Other uses ==
- Fallin, Stirling, a village in Scotland
- Fallin, a 2012 album by Tay Kewei

== See also ==
- Falling (disambiguation) or the variant spelling Fallin'
- Fallen (disambiguation)
- Fallon (disambiguation)
- Fall in, bugle call, see Assembly
