= Győr (disambiguation) =

Gyor may refer to:

- Győr, a city in the north-west of Hungary
- Győr-Moson-Sopron, the administrative county in Hungary which the above city resides in
- Győr (county), the historic administrative county of the Kingdom of Hungary in present-day north-western Hungary and south-western Slovakia
- Győr-Pér International Airport, an international airport situated near Győr city
- Győr (genus)

== See also ==
- Vib Gyor, an English rock band from Leeds
