= Faller (surname) =

Faller is a Germanic surname that may refer to

- Faller, a German toy company founded by brothers Edwin and Hermann Faller
- "Faller" (song), by Krista Siegfrids, 2016
- Chris Faller (born 1985), American bass guitar player
- Fred Faller (1895–1984), American long-distance runner
- Henry Faller (1927–2012), American businessman
- James E. Faller, American physicist
- Jason Faller, Canadian video game developer, cofounder of Camera 40 Productions
- Kevin Faller (1920–1983), Irish scriptwriter and poet
- Marion Faller (1941–2014), American photographer
- Newton Faller (1947–1996), Brazilian computer scientist and electrical engineer
- Otto Faller (1889–1971), German Jesuit priest and educator
- Ruwen Faller (born 1980), German sprinter
- Walter Faller (1909–2003), German politician
