= WTBM =

WTBM may refer to:

- WTBM-CD, a low-power television station (channel 24) licensed to serve Birmingham, Alabama, United States
- WIGY-FM, a radio station (100.7 FM) licensed to serve Mexico, Maine, United States, which held the call sign WTBM from 1987 to 2016
