= Falling out =

Falling out or Falling Out may refer to:

- Falling-out, a culture-bound syndrome

== Music ==
- Falling Out (Peter Bjorn and John album), 2004
- Falling Out (Serena Ryder album) or the title song, 1999
- "Falling Out", a song by Relient K from Two Lefts Don't Make a Right...but Three Do, 2003
- "Falling Out", a song by Ween from White Pepper, 2000

== See also ==
- Falling Down (disambiguation)
- Fallout (disambiguation)
