= Fallen =

Fallen may refer to:

== People ==
- Carl Fredrik Fallén (1764–1830), Swedish botanist and entomologist
- Gabriel Toledo (born 1991), known as FalleN, Brazilian Counter-Strike player

== Arts, entertainment, and media ==
=== Films ===
- Fallen (1998 film), starring Denzel Washington, John Goodman, and Donald Sutherland
- Fallen (2016 film), starring Addison Timlin, Jeremy Irvine, and Harrison Gilbertson

=== Literature ===
- Fallen (George novel), a 2004 crime novel by Kathleen George
- Fallen (Kate novel), a 2009 young adult fantasy novel by Lauren Kate
- Fallen (Slaughter novel), a 2011 crime novel by Karin Slaughter

=== Music ===
==== Albums ====
- Fallen (Burzum album), 2011
- Fallen (Evanescence album), 2003
- Fallen (Fields of the Nephilim album), 2002
- Fallen (For My Pain album), 2003
- Fallen (Stryper album), 2015
- Fallen (Tweak album), 2005

==== Songs ====
- "Fallen" (Mýa song), 2003
- "Fallen" (Sarah McLachlan song), 2003
- "Fallen" (Toyah song)
- "Fallen" (Vib Gyor song), 2006
- "Fallen" (Volbeat song), 2010
- "Fallen", a song by 30 Seconds to Mars from 30 Seconds to Mars
- "Fallen", a song by Haste the Day from the 2005 album When Everything Falls
- "Fallen", a song by Heaven Shall Burn from the 2013 album Veto
- "Fallen", a song by Imagine Dragons from the deluxe edition of Night Visions
- "Fallen", a song by Jaden Smith
- "Fallen", a song by Jason Derülo from Jason Derülo
- "Fallen", a song by Lauren Wood
- "Fallen", a song by Seether from Finding Beauty In Negative Spaces
- "Fallen", a song by Symphony X from the 2000 album V – The New Mythology Suite
- "Fallen", a song by Lola Amour

=== Television ===
==== Series ====
- Fallen (British TV series), a 2004 made for television UK drama serial starring Jonathan Cake and Simone Lahbib, directed by Omar Madha
- Fallen (miniseries), a 2006 made for television miniseries starring Paul Wesley, directed by Mikael Salomon
- Fallen (2023 TV series) (Sanningen), a six-part Swedish TV series starring Sofia Helin
- Fallen (2024 TV series), a British TV series based on the 2009 novel

==== Episodes ====
- "Fallen" (Stargate SG-1) an episode of the science-fiction series Stargate SG-1
- "Fallen" (Transformers episode), an episode of the Transformers Cybertron series
- "Fallen", a CSI: Miami (season 9) episode
- "Fallen", the pilot episode of the TV series Whistler
- "Fallen", the finale of Apple TV 2019-2023 psychological show Servant

== Other uses ==
- Fallen angel
- Fallen Footwear, the footwear brand that sponsors skateboarder Jamie Thomas

== See also ==
- Fall (disambiguation)
- Fallen arches (disambiguation)
- Falling (disambiguation)
- The Fallen (disambiguation)
- Faller (surname)
- Falen (disambiguation)
- Has Fallen (film series), an American film series starring Gerard Butler
