= The White EP (Vib Gyor EP) =

White EP

EP by Vib Gyor
- Released: 13 November 2007
- Recorded: 2007
- Genre: Alternative rock
- Length: 19:30
- Label: Promo Release.
- Producer: Ken Thomas

Vib Gyor chronology
The Secret EP (2007)	White EP (2007)

The "White EP" is a promo EP from the Leeds band Vib Gyor. It was first sold on their UK tour with American band Transfer and was released through their My Space page and official web-site on 13 November 2007. It is the follow-up to their The Secret EP. It was recorded in Rockfield studios in South Wales and produced by Ken Thomas.

== Track listing ==
1. Rhombus Suit 3:46
2. How Long Have I Lost 5:11
3. Silence 4:40
4. Ghosts 5:53
