= Down East Dickering =

- Created by: A&E Networks
- Starring: Various
- Country of origin: United States
- No. of seasons: 2
- No. of episodes: 16

Production
- Running time: 45 – 48 minutes

Original release
- Network: History Channel
- Release: 2 April 2014 – 21 January 2015

Down East Dickering is an American reality television series on the History Channel. The show, made by A&E Networks and filmed entirely in New England, premiered in 2014 and ran for two seasons, both of which filmed in 2014.

== Cast ==
- Tony Bennett (and his Jack Russell Terrier, Duke) (seasons 1 and 2)
- Stanley (Christopher) "Codfish" Cordwell (seasons 1 and 2)
- Clint Rohdin (seasons 1 and 2)
- Bruce Thomas (seasons 1 and 2)
- Nate Knight (seasons 1 and 2)
- Roland "Yummy" Raubeson (seasons 1 and 2)
- Mitchell Raubeson (seasons 1 and 2)
- Owen "Turtle" Mercon (season 1)
- Johnny Awesome (season 1)
- Walt "Captain Two-Stroke" McNeil (season 1)
- Tim Morin (season 2)
- Greg Morin (season 2)
- Jason Mottram (season 2)
- Shane "Speedy" St. Onge (season 2)
- Greg "Tinman" Bannon (season 2)

The groups, based on their geographical locations, are: Tony, his cousin Codfish and Duke; Clint, Bruce and Clint's son-in-law, Nate; Yummy and his son, Mitch; Turtle, Johnny and Captain; twin brothers Tim and Greg and their friend Jason; and Speedy and Tinman.

== Format ==
Several groups of bargain hunters (Dickerers) search through that week's edition of the Augusta-published Uncle Henry's in order to buy, sell, swap and trade items. Although it is titled Down East Dickering, none of the show is filmed in that part of Maine. For example, Tony and Codfish are based in Bethel; Clint, Bruce and Nate work out of Sangerville; Yummy and Mitch are in Minot; and Speedy and Tinman are in southern Maine.

The show is narrated by Bennett.

== Episodes ==
Both seasons were filmed in the summer and fall of 2013.

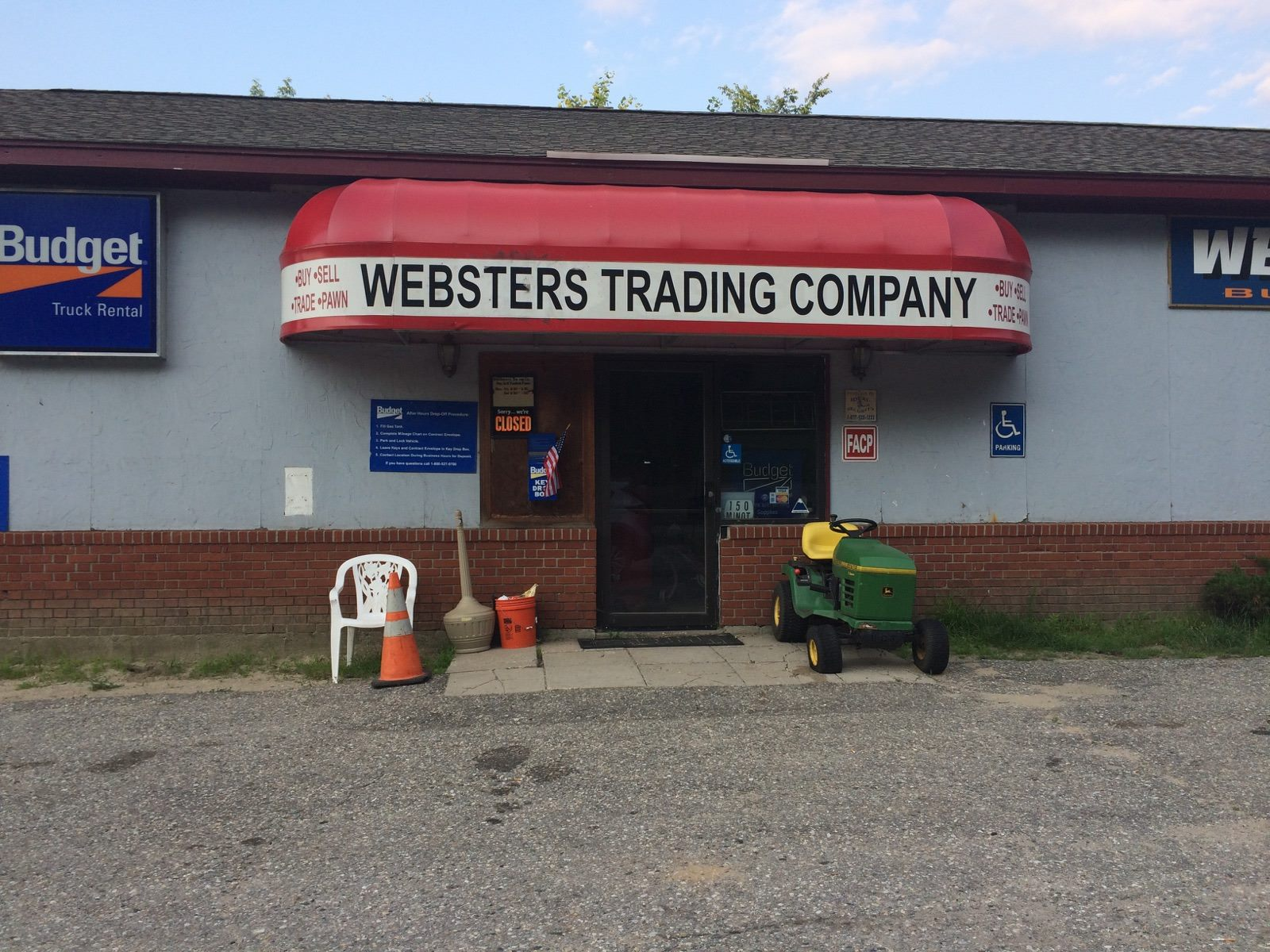
Auburn's Webster's Trading Company, a pawn shop owned by Donald "Donnie" Webster, is featured in several episodes

=== Season one ===
- "Dickering 101"
- "Risky Business"
- "Not So Fast..."
- "Mine Your Own Business"
- "You Can Take It With You"
- "Franken-Stuff"
- "Dicker-Fest!"
- "Blood, Sweat and Dickerers"

=== Season two ===
- "Let's Make a Deal"
- "All Jammed Up"
- "Mantiques Roadshow"
- "Used Cars and Old Guitars"
- "Born to Be Yummy"
- "Dickering Daze"
- "Back in Black"
- "Have Your Cake and Dicker Too"

== Cancellation ==
The show was cancelled after two seasons.
