= Fangs (album) =

Fangs!

Studio album by Falling Up
- Released: March 24, 2009
- Recorded: 2008
- Genre: Art rock, experimental rock
- Length: 46:52
- Label: BEC
- Producer: Casey Crescenzo

Falling Up chronology
Discover the Trees Again: The Best of Falling Up (2008)	Fangs! (2009)	Your Sparkling Death Cometh (2011)

Professional ratings
Review scores
Source	Rating
Alternative Addiction	2/5 stars
Jesus Freak Hideout	4/5 stars

Fangs! is the fourth studio album from experimental rock band Falling Up. It was released on March 24, 2009 through BEC Recordings. Unlike the band's previous work, Fangs! is a science fiction concept album.

== Background ==
Falling Up announced Fangs! in August 2008, recorded from September through November, and completed the album around late 2008. The material for the album was written during early and mid-2008. Album updates were announced via the band's MySpace blogs and official YouTube channel randomly during 2008.

On January 23, the band's official MySpace profile was changed to reflect the new album's artwork and style. The band added a new song, entitled "Streams of Woe at Acheron", to their Myspace profile on January 22 and announced the album pre-order on January 27. There were three pre-order choices, each consisting of the physical album and either band signatures or a t-shirt and plastic "fangs".

On March 4, Jesus Freak Hideout posted an album "PReview", which consisted of 20-second clips of every main track and a review, including track lengths.

On March 6, Falling Up posted a new song from the album, called "Goddess of the Dayspring, Am I", on their Myspace page. The track lengths for the version posted Falling Up's Myspace and the one reported by Jesus Freak Hideout are, for no known reason, different.

On March 13, Amazon posted Fangs! for pre-order via MP3 download, which included extended 30-second previews of each song. This posting confirmed that "Goddess of the Dayspring, Am I" has a song length of 4:31.

== Track listing ==
The album contains twelve songs and five transitional tracks that are not numbered. The transitional tracks are part of the songs they're listed before or after, more as introductions or lead-outs than anything. "Panic and Geo-Primaries" contains the chorus and main theme from "Arch to Achilles" on the band's earlier album, Captiva.

- "Blooming from the Corner"

1. "A Colour Eoptian" – 3:48
2. "Lotus and the Languorous" – 4:43
3. "Streams of Woe at Acheron" – 4:20
4. "Magician Reversed" – 5:07
  - "The Discoveratory"
5. "Golden Arrows" – 4:07
6. "The King's Garden" – 2:34
7. "Panic and Geo-Primaries" – 3:56
8. "The Moonn and Sixpence" – 3:33
  - "Our Lady Satuernn's Reef"
9. "Goddess of the Dayspring, Am I" – 4:31
10. "The Sidewinder Flux" – 4:36
  - "Gears Under the Water"
11. "The Chilling Alpine Adventure" – 3:39
12. "Swimming Towards Propellers" – 2:04
  - "The Signal From Forum A"

== Personnel ==
Falling Up

- Jessy Ribordy – vocals, guitar, keyboards, synthesizers, programming
- Daniel Elder – guitar
- Jeremy Miller – bass guitar
- Josh Shroy – drums, percussion

Additional

- Casey Crescenzo – additional guitar and vocals, songwriter except on tracks 6 and 12, producer, engineer, mixer
- Troy Glessner – mastering at Spectre Studio
