= Belfast Falls =

Belfast Falls may refer to:

- Falls Road, Belfast in Belfast, Northern Ireland
- Belfast Falls (Northern Ireland Parliament constituency)
- Belfast Falls (UK Parliament constituency)
- Lower Falls (District Electoral Area)
- Upper Falls (District Electoral Area)

== See also ==
- Belfast (disambiguation)
- Falls (disambiguation)
