= Fallen arches =

Fallen arches may refer to:

- Flat feet
- Fallen Arches (radio show), 1988–89 radio show on BBC Radio 4
- Fallen Arches (film), 1998
- "Fallen Arches", 2000 episode of The Powerpuff Girls
- "Fallen Arches", 2006 episode of The Venture Bros.

== See also ==
- Fallen (disambiguation)
- Arches (disambiguation)
