= Dark Life =

2010 novel by Kat Falls

- Author: Kat Falls
- Language: American English
- Genre: Science fiction, post-apocalypse, adventure fiction
- Publisher: Scholastic
- Publication date: May 1, 2010
- Publication place: United States
- Media type: Print (hardcover)
- Pages: 304
- ISBN: 0545178150
- Followed by: Rip Tide

Dark Life is the first book in a futuristic adventure fiction and science fiction series of the same name by Kat Falls. The novel was published May 1, 2010 by Scholastic. Falls has written a sequel: Rip Tide. Scholastic has published a study guide for the books.

Publishing rights outside the USA were sold in six languages.

== Plot summary ==
The world has been plunged underwater leaving very little land left above water. A teenage boy, Ty, has spent his entire life underwater helping his family farm their sea homestead. Ty meets a teenage girl, Gemma, from the land, who is looking for her brother. A group of sea bandits known as the "Seablite Gang" attacks Ty's homestead and he and Gemma try to capture the bandits. However, a member of the gang, Shade, turns out to be Gemma's brother. It also turns out that Shade, like Ty, has a "dark gift" that allows him to change his appearance, however Ty's dark gift is that he is able to use echo-location similar to a bat.

== Awards ==
Dark Life was nominated for the following awards.

- Sunshine State Young Reader Award (2011)
- Children's Book Award (2011)
- Rebecca Caudill Young Reader's Book Award (2011)
- Maud Hart Lovelace Award (2011)
- Truman Reader's Award (2011)
- Golden Sower Award (2011)
- Buckeye Children's Book Award (2011)
- Junior Book Award (2011)
- Beehive Book Award (2011)
- Dorothy Canfield Fisher Children's Book Award (2011)

== Film adaptation ==
On April 5, 2010, Robert Zemeckis was set to direct the film adaptation for Disney and will co-produce with Gotham Group through ImageMovers.
