= The Falls =

The Falls may refer to:

- The Falls (Oates novel), 2004 novel by Joyce Carol Oates
- The Falls (Rankin novel), 2001 crime novel by Ian Rankin
- The Falls (mall), an open-air shopping mall in Kendall, Florida
- The Falls, Nova Scotia, a small community in Colchester County, Nova Scotia, Canada
- The Falls, Queensland, a locality in the Southern Downs Region, Australia
- The Falls, a 2011 LGBT film trilogy directed by Jon Garcia
- The Falls (1980 film), directed by Peter Greenaway
- The Falls (1991 film), a Canadian documentary film directed by Kevin McMahon
- The Falls (2021 film), a Taiwanese film by Chung Mong-hong

== See also ==
- Fall (disambiguation)
- Falls (disambiguation)
- The Fall (disambiguation)
- The Falls Road, a major road and district in west Belfast, Northern Ireland
- The Falls Church, a church in the city of Falls Church, Virginia near Washington, D. C.
