= Silver City (Falling Up album) =

Silver City EP

Studio album by Falling Up
- Released: December 6, 2013
- Genre: Experimental rock, Christian rock, Christmas
- Length: 45:07
- Producer: Jessy Ribordy

Falling Up chronology
Hours (2012)	Silver City EP (2013)	Falling Up (2015)

Silver City is a 2013 Christmas album recorded by experimental Christian rock band Falling Up. It was released digitally on December 6, 2013, and contained 11 tracks. It was the only Christmas-related album that Falling Up released. Although the band labeled it as an "extended play", at 11 tracks, it exceeds both Billboard's and the RIAA's definition for an EP, which is capped at six and five maximum tracks, respectively. The iTunes Store and Amazon.com versions did not include the opening track, "Intro/Jingle Bells".

Due to the album's release being too close to Christmas to press physical copies and mail them in time, Falling Up only released the album digitally, stating that they would most likely remaster the album, add a few songs and release physical copies for Christmas 2014.

After the initial release of Silver City, the album was made available through Groupees for a $1.00 minimum donation in support of the Typhoon Haiyan victims, with 100% of the proceeds going to Action Against Hunger's relief fund.

== Reception ==
The Silver City EP generally received very positive reviews, with many mentioning its uniqueness as a Christmas album. Jesus Freak Hideout's David Craft noted that the EP is "well-worth many spins this holiday season, and will surely provide [listeners] with a fresh enjoyment of even the most traditional carols".

Professional ratings
Review scores
Source	Rating
Jesus Freak Hideout	4.5/5 stars

== Track listing ==
The album contained 11 basic tracks.

All tracks are written by Falling Up, except where noted.

Album release
No.	Title	Writer(s)	Length
1.	"Intro/Jingle Bells"	Falling Up, James Lord Pierpont	1:54
2.	"Carol of the Bells"	Falling Up, Mykola Leontovych	5:28
3.	"Emanuel" (featuring Brittany Wiinikka)	John Mason Neale	6:28
4.	"Silent Night"	Franz Xaver Gruber, Joseph Mohr	3:44
5.	"Oh Holy Night"	Adolphe Adam	4:51
6.	"Oh Holy Night Reprise"	Adolphe Adam	4:35
7.	"Silver Creek"	Jessy Ribordy	1:55
8.	"Sugar Plum Fairy"	Pyotr Ilyich Tchaikovsky	2:31
9.	"Song In the Air"	Josiah G. Holland	5:21
10.	"Silver City"	Jessy Ribordy	3:02
11.	"The Little Robot"	Falling Up	6:04
12.	"Silver City Sleeps"	Jessy Ribordy	2:24
Total length:			48:28
