= Andrew Anthony =

British journalist

- Born: United Kingdom
- Occupation: Journalist
- Writing career
- Language: English
- Genre: Journalism

Andrew Anthony is a journalist who has written for The Guardian since 1990, and The Observer.

== Published works ==
- On Penalties (Yellow Jersey Press, 2000)
- The Fall-Out: How a Guilty Liberal Lost His Innocence (Jonathan Cape, 2007)
