= Fallout (disambiguation) =

Fallout is residual radioactive material from a nuclear explosion.

Fallout, fall out or fall-out may also refer to:

== Books ==
- Fallout (novel), 2010, by Ellen Hopkins
- Fall Out, 1957 anti-nuclear study edited by Bertrand Russell
- Fall-Out, the English translation of Gudrun Pausewang's novel Die Wolke, 1987
- Fallout: An American Nuclear Tragedy, a 1989 book by Philip L. Fradkin
- The Fall-Out, a 2007 book by Andrew Anthony

== Film ==
- Fallout (2008 film), a 2008 British television drama
- Fallout, a 2010 Polish film by Wilhelm Sasnal
- Fallout, a 2013 documentary on author Nevil Shute and the making of Stanley Kramer's On the Beach
- Mission: Impossible – Fallout, a 2018 American action film starring Tom Cruise
- The Fallout (film), a 2021 American drama

== Television ==
=== Series ===
- Fallout (Irish TV series), a 2006 Irish two-part docudrama
- Fallout, the working title of the 2020 Australian TV series Operation Buffalo
- Fallout (American TV series), a 2024 series based on the video game franchise of the same name

=== Episodes ===
- "Fallout" (AfterMASH)
- "The Fallout" (Arrested Development)
- "Fallout" (Arrow)
- "Fallout" (The Flash)
- "Fallout" (Haven)
- "Fallout" (Heroes)
- "Fallout" (Jericho)
- "Fallout" (Masters of Sex)
- "Fallout" (NCIS: Los Angeles)
- "Fall Out" (The Prisoner)
- "Fallout" (Smallville)
- "The Fallout" (Smash)
- "Fallout" (Stargate SG-1)
- "Fallout" (Supergirl)
- "Fallout" (Wentworth)

== Games ==
- Fallout (franchise), a video game series currently developed by Bethesda Game Studios
  - Fallout (video game), a 1997 video game and the first title in the series

== Music ==
=== Albums ===
- Fallout (Front Line Assembly album), 2007
- Fallout (The Mayfield Four album), 1998
- The Fallout (Crown the Empire album), 2012
- The Fallout (Default album), 2001
- Fall Out, a 1968 album by Terry Smith

=== Songs ===
- "Fallout" (Marianas Trench song), 2011
- "Fallout" (Catfish and the Bottlemen song), 2014
- "Fallout" (Masked Wolf song), 2022
- "Fall Out" (song)", 1977, by The Police
- "Fall Out", a 1977 song by The Monochrome Set
- "Fall Out", retitled "Fall In", an earlier version of the above song played by Adam and the Ants, eventually the B-Side of hit single "Antmusic"
- "Fallout", a 2010 song by Alter Bridge from AB III
- "Fallout", a 2016 song by The Browning from The Browning
- "Fallout", a 2010 song by Linkin Park from A Thousand Suns
- "Fallout", a 2011 song by Neon Indian from Era Extraña
- "Fallout", a 2008 song by Sonic Syndicate from Love and Other Disasters
- "Fallout", a 2024 song by X Ambassadors from Townie
- "The Fallout", a 2006 song by The Haunted from The Dead Eye

=== Other uses in music ===
- Fallout (band), a Brooklyn-based heavy metal band
- Fallout Records, an English record label

== Other ==
- Fallout (comics), a character from DC Comics
- Tephra, the result of a volcano eruption
- Fallout, a general term for negative unintended consequences
- Debris fallout, debris lofted by tornadoes into the atmosphere falling downstream
- Bird fallout, the result of severe weather on migrating birds
- Microarchitectural Data Sampling, also called Fallout, a computer microprocessor vulnerability
- Deposition (aerosol physics), the process by which aerosol particles collect or deposit themselves on solid surfaces

== See also ==
- Fall Out Boy, American rock band
- Fallout Boy (disambiguation)
- Falling out (disambiguation)
- Outfall
