= Mnemos EP =

Remix album by Falling Up
- Released: April 10, 2012
- Recorded: February–March 2012
- Genres: Experimental rock, Christian rock, remix
- Length: 32:23
- Label: Independent
- Producer: Jessy Ribordy

Falling Up chronology
Your Sparkling Death Cometh (2011)	Mnemos EP (2012)	Hours (2012)

Mnemos is a 2012 remix EP recorded by Christian experimental rock band Falling Up. It was released on April 10, 2012, as part of a "pay-as-you-can" package on Groupees, a website which allows users to purchase packages containing various digital downloads. All of the proceeds from the album went to benefit the homeless, with over 3,200 meals being served from the project. Falling Up offered two reward packages, with the first consisting of three bonus tracks if there were over 1,000 downloads. Within the first day, the 1,000 mark was broken. After the promotion, the album became available for download on the band's BandCamp page.

Although Mnemos is a remix album, most of the tracks are orchestral in nature, with various hooks in earlier tracks being used and repeated throughout the album. The end result is that the tracks sound very dissimilar to the originals on which they were based. The band was only able to remix tracks from Your Sparkling Death Cometh, due to the rights of their prior works still being owned by BEC Recordings.

== Reception ==
The Mnemos EP received generally positive reviews, with many noting that its nature was very different from Falling Up's earlier works, and describing the release as a "filler" between albums. Jesus Freak Hideout's Nathaniel Schexnayder said that Mnemos was "worth [a] few spins. But after fans have given their attention to the project for a couple of hours, it will no doubt appear as repetitive and forgettable".

Professional ratings
Review scores
Source	Rating
Jesus Freak Hideout	3.5/5 stars

== Track listing ==
The album contained seven basic tracks, with three bonus tracks released:

All tracks are written by Falling Up, except where noted.

Album release
No.	Title	Length
1.	"Pete the Little Robot Comes Home"	6:00
2.	"Taipan"	6:51
3.	"Alexis"	4:58
4.	"Glassen"	4:30
5.	"Caves"	3:52
6.	"Earthship"	6:00
7.	"Remembering Pete"	0:47
8.	"Evidence" (BandCamp exclusive)	6:08
9.	"Now Available on VHS" (BandCamp exclusive)	3:49
10.	"Now Sleep Sound Pete" (Groupees exclusive)	2:24
Total length:		45:07
