= Archers Rise =

American Christian rock band

- Origin: Corvallis, Oregon, United States
- Genres: Christian rock, experimental rock
- Years active: 2009-present
- Labels: Save the City, Independent
- Spinoff of: Falling Up
- Members: Tom Cox; Jeremiah Wilson; Matthew Flood; Lee Edward
- Past members: Ben Kermoyan; Marshall Thompson; Luke Buchanan; Steven Tallman
- Website: archersrise.com

Archers Rise is an American Christian rock band from Corvallis, Oregon. The band was formed in 2009 as Becoming an Archer by lead singer Tom Cox, a former guitarist of Falling Up, and guitarist Luke Buchanan. Archers Rise self-released a single in 2010, and released their self-titled debut EP in 2012. In 2013 the band successfully raised funds via a KickStarter campaign to record another album, Jupiter Bound, which was released in 2014.

== History ==
Archers Rise, initially known as "Becoming an Archer", originally began as a side-project started by Tom Cox, following his departure as one of Falling Up's guitarists in 2005. At its beginning, the band consisted of Cox, Ben Kermoyan, Marshall Thompson, and Steven Tallman. This lineup changed considerably between 2009 and 2012, with Cox being the only consistent member. Archers Rise self-produced and released their first single, entitled "Be Alive" via Amazon.com in early 2010. After releasing the single, Jeremiah Wilson and Lee Edward were added as more permanent additions to the band's lineup, playing drums and bass, respectively. Keyboardist Matthew Flood joined a few months later, and Cox began writing new material for the band's first release, which would later become their self-titled EP.

It was announced on April 21, 2011, that the group was in the studio working on a six-track EP which was initially planned to be released in the Fall of 2011. As promotion, the band released two demos, "Sweet Ghost" and "Ceilings" on their PureVolume page. The band decided to rebrand themselves as "Archers Rise, and recorded their self-titled project throughout 2011. The Archers Rise EP was released on January 30, 2012, and was produced by Jessy Ribordy of Falling Up, and engineered by Kelsey Smith. The band toured for the remainder of 2012, and well into 2013, mostly on the west coast, in order to promote their release.

== Jupiter Bound ==
In June, 2013, Archers Rise announced that they were getting ready for a new release, entitled "Jupiter Bound." In order to fund the album, they used KickStarter, where they successfully met their funding goal on July 10, 2013. Several well-known individuals offered their public support for the album's funding, including Mike Parker, the official sportscaster for the Oregon State University Beavers, as well as Ian Nelson, pastor of Solid Rock Church of Portland, Oregon. Immediately after meeting their goal, Archers Rise began working on the recording of the album. Jeff Schneeweis of Number One Gun produced Jupiter Bound.

The album was released on June 3, 2014, with the official album release show held on June 5. Jupiter Bound's lead single, "Sway With Me," was a featured song on WUFM's RadioU Buzztrack, and reached #30 on Christian Rock radio according to Billboard. The album's second single, Mirrors topped the charts at #4 on Christian Rock radio, as well as #1 on ChristianRock.net. The album sold well and garnered a four-and-a-half star rating from Jesus Freak Hideout, with David Craft noting that "Jupiter Bound is constructing a new standard of quality within the indie rock scene."

== Discography ==
Title	Date	Label
Be Alive (single)	February 9, 2010	Independent
Archers Rise EP	January 30, 2012	Independent
Jupiter Bound	June 3, 2014	Save the City Records
Walking With Me (single)	January 16, 2018	Independent
Drive (single)	May 15, 2018	Independent
Fall Down (single)	June 26, 2018	Independent
Closer (single)	January 27, 2025	Independent

=== Singles ===
Title	Album	Year	Christian Rock Charts
Sway With Me	Jupiter Bound	2014	No. 30
Mirrors	Jupiter Bound	2014	No. 4

== Members ==
- Tom Cox - Rhythm Guitar, Lead Vocals
- Lee Edward - Bass
- Jeremiah Wilson - Drums, Backup Vocals
- Matthew Flood - Keys, Backup Vocals

=== Former members ===
- Luke Buchanan - Lead Guitar
- Ben Kermoyan
- Marshall Thompson
- Steven Tallman
