= FAL =

Fal or FAL may refer to:

== Places ==
- Fal, Fars, a village in Iran
- Fal, South Khorasan, a village in Iran
- Fal Rural District, Fars Province, Iran
- Fál or Inis Fáil, an ancient name for Ireland
- River Fal, Cornwall, England
- FAL, station code for Falmouth Docks railway station, in England

== Military ==
- Lebanese Armed Forces (French: Forces Armées Libanaises)
- HMS Fal, original name of UBS Mayu, the first flagship of the Burmese Navy
- FN FAL, a Belgian battle rifle

== Other uses ==
- F.A.L. or Fal-Car, an automobile manufactured from 1909 to 1914
- Ferrovie Appulo Lucane, an Italian railway company
- Federal Agricultural Research Centre, a German research organisation
- File Access Listener, a network file access protocol
- Flavour and Life, an Australian food and beverage company
- Foodland Associated Limited, an Australian former company, acquired by IGA (Australian supermarket group) in 2005
- Free Art License, a popular copyright license for creative works.
- Fal (Spelljammer) a character in Dungeons & Dragons
- fal, ISO 639-3 code for the South Fali branch of the Fali languages (Cameroon)

== See also ==
- fals (disambiguation)
- Fall (disambiguation)
