= Fals (disambiguation) =

Fals or variation, may refer to:

- Fals (Arabic: فلس), a medieval copper coin
- Fals, Lot-et-Garonne, Nouvelle-Aquitaine, France; a commune
- Iwan Fals (born 1961), Indonesian musician
- Familial amyotrophic lateral sclerosis (fALS), the heritable form of Lou Gehrig's Disease, a motor neuron disease

== See also ==
- FAL (disambiguation)
- Falls (disambiguation)
