= The Fallen =

The Fallen may refer to:

== Arts, entertainment, and media ==
=== Fictional entities ===
- The Fallen (comics), character in Marvel Comics
- The Fallen (also referred to as Megatronus Prime), a character in the Transformers franchise

=== Film and television ===
- The Fallen (1926 film), a German silent film
- The Fallen (2004 film), a 2004 film about World War II
- The Fallen (Arrow), an episode of Arrow

=== Games ===
- Star Trek: Deep Space Nine: The Fallen, a 2000 video game
- The Fallen, also known as Eliksni, are a race in Destiny and Destiny 2.

=== Literature ===
Series

- The Fallen (series), a series of novels authored by Thomas E. Sniegoski

Books

- The Fallen (Higson novel), book 5 in Charlie Higson's young adult horror series, The Enemy
- The Fallen, a novel by Stephen Finucan
- The Fallen (2016), a futuristic Christian novel by Robert Don Hughes, published by Venture Press
- The Fallen, a novel by T. Jefferson Parker

Poetry

- For the Fallen, by Laurence Binyon, often recited at Remembrance Day services.

=== Music ===
Groups

- We Are the Fallen, a band consisting of several former Evanescence members

Songs

- "The Fallen", a 2006 song by the rock band Franz Ferdinand
- "The Fallen", a 2012 song by Hoobastank from Fight or Flight
- "The Fallen", a song by the metal band Suicide Silence

== See also ==
- Fallen (disambiguation)
