= Falls City =

Falls City may refer to:

== Places in the United States ==
- Falls City, Nebraska
- Falls City, Oregon
- Falls City, Texas
- Falls City, Wisconsin
- Louisville, Kentucky, nicknamed "Falls City"

== Other uses ==
- Falls City Brewing Company, a brewing company that operated in Louisville from 1905 to 1978

== See also ==
- Fall City, Washington
