= Fall (Overlake album) =

Studio album by Overlake
- Released: May 12, 2017
- Genre: Alternative rock, indie rock, shoegaze
- Label: Bar/None Records
- Producer: Overlake, Tom Beajour

Overlake chronology
Sighs (2014)	Fall (2017)

Fall is the second studio album from the American rock band Overlake.

== Content ==
The eight-track album was released on vinyl, compact disc on digital download on May 12, 2017, with Bar/None Records. It is produced by Overlake and Tom Beajour. The album is described as shimmering psych pop, is reminiscent of 1990s shoegaze, and compared to the music of Guided by Voices, and My Bloody Valentine. Barrett notes in an interview with The Jersey Journal, that drummer Nick D'Amore being in the band for year prior to its recording, they "finally landed on our sound[,] and that [it] leads to this record sounding more cohesive."

The record release party for Fall was held on May 12, 2017, at the Mercury Lounge in Manhattan, New York City, with the bands HEAVEN, and Dead Stars.

== Reception ==
Professional ratings
Review scores
Source	Rating
AllMusic	4/5 stars
Blurt	3/5 stars

A review by Blurt says the band focuses on "emphasizing melody over crunch[,] with a propulsive rhythm section that never lets things get too wispy. Guitarist Tom Barrett has a typically mellifluous voice, but with a croon that sounds like Eric Matthews after taking acid, what other kind of music is he going to sing? Bassist Lysa Opfer chimes in from time to time as well, frosting a vocal blend heavy on the creamy side." On the production New Jersey Stage says Fall is "solid throughout, thanks in part to Tom Beaujour helping to keep the band's endearing pop elements from drowning in waves of delicious noise."

For the song "Winter is Why," BrooklynVegan describes it as "hooky, harmony-filled and voluminous while dodging specific reference points." Fall was listed as a local worthy album in PopMatters' list of The Best Shoegaze and Dream Pop of 2017.

== Track listing ==
No.	Title	Length
1.	"Unnamed November"	3:58
2.	"Winter is Why"	5:34
3.	"You Don't Know Everything"	6:52
4.	"Can Never Tell"	4:03
5.	"Gardener's Bell"	4:37
6.	"And Again"	4:03
7.	"Pines on a Beach"	7:42
8.	"Goodbye"	5:44
Total length:		36:25

== Personnel ==
- Tom Barrett – guitar and vocals
- Nick D'Amore – drums
- Lysa Opfer – bass and vocals
