= Robert Falls =

American theatre director

- Born: March 2, 1954 (age 71); Ashland, Illinois, U.S.
- Education: University of Illinois, Urbana-Champaign (BFA)
- Spouse: Kat Falls
- Children: 3

Robert Falls (born March 2, 1954) is an American theater director and the former artistic director of the Goodman Theatre in Chicago, Illinois. Hailed as "Chicago's most essential director" by the Chicago Tribune, Falls' four-decade career spans groundbreaking new plays, reimagined classics, opera, and large-scale musical works. He has been featured in American Theatre magazine as one of the "most powerful" individuals in the American theater.

== Early years ==
Robert Arthur Falls was born March 2, 1954, in Springfield, IL to Arthur Joseph Falls and Nancy (Stribling) Falls. He grew up in Ashland, IL, before moving with his family to Champaign at age 12 and later to suburban Chicago. After earning a BFA in Directing and Playwriting from the University of Illinois Urbana-Champaign in 1976, he briefly studied acting in New York with Edward Kaye-Martin.

== Directing career ==
Falls returned to the Midwest to direct Michael Weller's Moonchildren for Apollo Productions in Chicago—a remount of his university production. Its success earned him a Joseph Jefferson Award. His 1977 staging of Of Mice and Men at Wisdom Bridge Theatre brought a second Jeff Award and his appointment as artistic director at age 23.

From 1977 to 1985, Falls led Wisdom Bridge, where he built his reputation for bold, emotionally charged interpretations of classic and contemporary works. His productions included Travesties, Mother Courage and Her Children, A Streetcar Named Desire, In the Belly of the Beast; and John Olive's Standing on My Knees, which transferred to the Manhattan Theatre Club. Falls also championed innovative artists like Shozo Sato, who reimagined Western classics through Japanese Kabuki, broadening the theater's appeal.

Under his leadership, Wisdom Bridge became known for inventive, off-Loop theatre. Falls concluded his tenure in 1985 with Hamlet, starring Aidan Quinn, before becoming artistic director of the Goodman Theatre in 1986.

Two of Mr. Falls' most highly acclaimed Broadway productions, Death of a Salesman and Long Day's Journey into Night (both first staged at Chicago's Goodman Theatre) won seven Tony Awards and three Drama Desk Awards combined. Other noteworthy Broadway productions include Shining City (Tony Award nomination), Talk Radio (Tony Award nomination), The Rose Tattoo (Tony Award nomination), Desire Under the Elms, The Night of the Iguana, and The Young Man from Atlanta. His Broadway production of Elton John and Tim Rice's Aida, for which he also co-wrote the book, continues to be performed worldwide.

Off-Broadway, Falls directed The Iceman Cometh, The Jacksonian, Swing State, Blue Surge, The Food Chain, subUrbia (Obie Award), and We're Only Alive for a Short Amount of Time. His directing honors include a Helen Hayes Award for King Lear and multiple Jeff Awards.

Falls made his operatic debut at Lyric Opera of Chicago in 1993 with Susannah, starring Renee Fleming and Samuel Ramey. He later directed The Consul for Lyric Opera and returned to Susannah for New York's Metropolitan Opera, the Houston Grand Opera, the Washington Opera, the Grand Théâtre de Genève in Switzerland, and the Palacio Euskalduna in Bilbao, Spain. In 2019, he directed Don Giovanni for Lyric Opera and again in 2020 for Dallas Opera.

In 2015, Falls was inducted into the Theater Hall of Fame. His numerous honors include awards from the Moscow Art Theatre, Eugene O'Neill Society, Illinois Arts Council, League of Chicago Theatres, and the American Academy of Arts and Sciences. He also received an Honorary Doctor of Fine Arts from Lake Forest College and a Special Jeff Award for Outstanding Contributions to Theatre.

=== Goodman Theatre ===
From 1986 to 2022, Falls served as the Artistic Director of Chicago's Goodman Theatre. Over 35 years, he transformed the institution into one of the nation's leading arts organizations, directing more than 40 productions and producing or co-producing hundreds more, including over 150 world premieres. Under his leadership, the Goodman received the 1992 Special Tony Award for Outstanding Regional Theater and was named "the number one regional theater in the U.S." by Time magazine in 2003.

Falls brought international attention to the Goodman through groundbreaking productions, a new state-of-the-art facility, and nationally recognized community and education programs. His Broadway transfers earned more than 20 Tony Awards. His long-running collaboration with Brian Dennehy on various plays, many written by Eugene O'Neill—including Life of Galileo (1986), The Iceman Cometh (1990, 2012), A Touch of the Poet (1996), Death of a Salesman (1999), Long Day's Journey into Night (2001), Hughie (2004), and Desire Under the Elms (2009)—garnered acclaim in Chicago, on Broadway, and at international venues such as the Stratford Festival and Dublin's Abbey Theatre.

Falls's other acclaimed productions at the Goodman include the musical Pal Joey (with a new book by Falls); the American premieres of Alan Ayckbourn's House and Garden; world premieres such as Richard Nelson's Frank's Home, Rebecca Gilman's Swing State, Luna Gale, Dollhouse, Adam Rapp's The Sound Inside, and David Cale's We'te Only Alive for a Short Amount of Time; Shakespeare productions such as King Lear, Measure for Measure, The Tempest, and The Winter's Tale; modern classics such as The Misanthrope, Three Sisters, Uncle Vanya, and Landscape of the Body; contemporary works such as Pamplona, Eric Bogosian's Griller, Steve Tesich's The Speed of Darkness and On the Open Road, and John Logan's Riverview: A Melodrama with Music; Arthur Miller's final work Finishing the Picture; and adaptations such as Chekhov's The Seagull and The Cherry Orchard, Ibsen's An Enemy of the People, and Roberto Bolaño's 2666, co-adapted and co-directed with Seth Bockley.

Falls concluded his Goodman tenure in 2022 with his award-winning production of The Cherry Orchard.

== Personal life ==
In 1993, Falls married Kathleen Moynihan, an American novelist specializing in young adult science-fiction (pen name Kat Falls.) They have three children: Declan, Vivienne, and Connor Falls.
