= Phalen =

Phalen is a surname. Notable people with the surname include:

- Dennis T. Phalen (1856–1922), American politician
- Edward Phelan (c.1811–1850), early settler of Saint Paul, Minnesota, US

- Lake Phalen, a lake in Saint Paul, Minnesota

- Eugene A. Phalen (1876–1940), American businessman and politician
- George S. Phalen (1911–1998), American hand surgeon

- Phalen maneuver, a diagnostic test for carpal tunnel syndrome

- Gerard Phalen (1934–2021), Canadian politician, educator, and union leader
- Robert Phalen (1937–1995), American actor
