= Fall (surname) =

Fall is a surname. Notable people with the surname include:

- Aicha Fall (born 1993), Mauritanian sprinter
- Aïda Fall (born 1986), French basketball player
- Albert B. Fall (1861–1944), American politician
- Ameth Fall (born 1991), Senegalese footballer
- Amy Sarr Fall
- Anna Christy Fall (1855–1930), lawyer
- Assane Dame Fall (born 1984), Senegalese sprint canoeist
- Bamba Fall (born 1986), Senegalese basketball player
- Baye Fall (basketball) (born 2003), Senegalese basketball player
- Baye Djiby Fall (born 1985), Senegalese footballer
- Benjamin Fall (born 1989), French rugby union player
- Brian Fall (born 1937), British diplomat
- Catherine Fall (born 1967), British special adviser
- Charles D. Fall (born 1989), Member of the New York State Assembly from District 61
- Constance Amy Fall (1903–1992), Australian nurse
- Fatou Bintou Fall (born 1981), Senegalese sprinter
- François Lonseny Fall (born 1949), Guinean diplomat and politician
- Henry Clinton Fall (1862–1939), American entomologist
- Ibrahima Fall (politician) (born 1942), Senegalese politician
- Jeremy Fall (born 1990), American Chef, Restaurateur, and TV Personality
- Jim Fall (born 1962), American film and television director and film producer
- Joseph Fall (1895-1988), Canadian aviator and military officer
- Kader Fall (born 1986), Senegalese footballer
- Khadi Fall (born 1948), Senegalese writer and politician
- Khadimou Fall (born 1998), American rapper known professionally as Sheck Wes
- Lamine Fall (born 1992), Senegalese footballer
- Leo Fall (1873–1925), Austrian composer
- Malick Fall (footballer) (born 1968), Senegalese footballer
- Malick Fall (swimmer) (born 1985), Senegalese swimmer
- Matar Fall (born 1982), French-born Senegalese footballer
- Mbarika Fall (born 1970), Senegalese basketball player
- Michael Fall (born 1980), Belgian DJ and record producer
- Mike Fall (born 1961), American soccer player
- Moustapha Fall, French basketball player
- Pape Moussa Fall (born 2005), Senegalese footballer
- Pape Niokhor Fall (born 1977), Senegalese footballer
- Souleymane Fall (born 1969), Senegalese footballer
- Tacko Fall (born 1995), Senegalese basketball player
- Wal Fall (born 1992), German footballer

== See also ==
- Falls (surname)
