= Kat Falls =

American writer

- Born: 1964 (age 61–62); Silver Spring, Maryland, U.S.
- Education: Rensselaer Polytechnic Institute (BS); Northwestern University (MFA)
- Spouse: Robert Falls
- Children: 3
- Writing career
- Genres: Science-fiction, adventure fiction
- Notable works: Dark Life, Rip Tide, Inhuman
- Website: katfalls.net

Kat Falls (born 1964) is an American novelist specializing in science-fiction. Some of her works are Dark Life, the sequel Rip Tide, Inhuman, and the sequel Undaunted.

== Early life ==
Kat Falls was born in Silver Spring, Maryland and attended Rensselaer Polytechnic Institute as an undergrad. She went on to receive an MFA in screenwriting from Northwestern University.

== Writing career ==
Falls' debut novel, Dark Life, was published by the Scholastic Corporation in May 2010 and is now sold in eighteen international markets. Dark Life has been nominated for children's book awards in the states. Falls was awarded a 2011 Juvenile Library Award by The Friends of American Writers. The sequel, Rip Tide, was published on August 1, 2011. Each book was designated as "A Junior Library Guild Selection".

The next novel Falls wrote was Inhuman, which was acquired by Scholastic Press for publication in Fall of 2013. It was nominated for a 2015-16 Missouri Association of School Librarians Truman Readers Award.

Her latest book came out on March 26, 2019. It is the sequel to Inhuman and is titled Undaunted.

== Personal life ==
In 2013 Falls lives in Evanston, Illinois with her husband, theatre director Robert Falls, and their three children. She teaches screenwriting at Northwestern University.
