= WEZR (AM) =

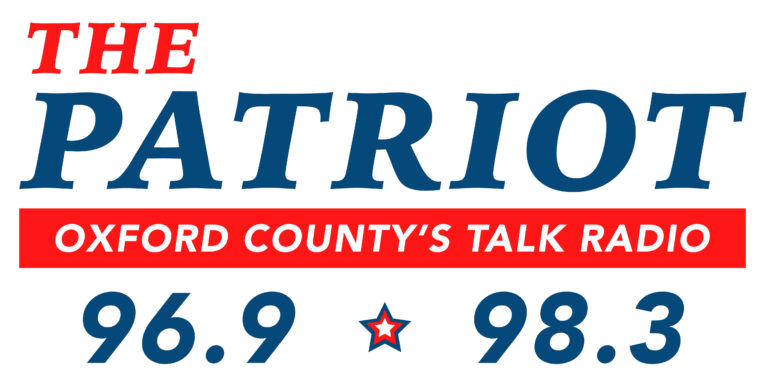
- Rumford, Maine; United States
- Broadcast area: Western Maine
- Frequency: 780 kHz
- Branding: The Patriot

Programming
- Format: Conservative talk
- Affiliations: Fox News Radio; Westwood One; Motor Racing Network

Ownership
- Owner: Stan Bennett; (Bennett Radio Group, LLC)
- Sister stations: WIGY; WIGY-FM; WOXO-FM; WPNO; Channel X Radio

History
- First air date: August 21, 1953
- Last air date: October 2024
- Former call signs: WRUM (1952–1997); WLLB (1997–2001); WTME (2001–2020); WIGY (2020)

Technical information
- Licensing authority: FCC
- Facility ID: 9209
- Class: D
- Power: 1,000 watts day; 18 watts night
- Transmitter coordinates: 44°30′53.2″N 70°30′59.2″W
- Translator: 98.3 W252DS (Rumford)

Links
- Public license information: Public file; LMS
- Website: thepatriot.me

WEZR (780 kHz) was an AM radio station in Rumford, Maine. The station was owned by Stan Bennett, through licensee Bennett Radio Group, LLC. At the time of its closure in 2024, WEZR aired a conservative talk radio format.

== History ==
The station went on the air August 21, 1953, as WRUM, associated with the Rumford Daily Times newspaper. It changed its call sign to WLLB on November 21, 1997, and to WTME on July 11, 2001.

WTME's programming was previously simulcast with WCNM (1240 AM) in Lewiston and WKTQ (1450 AM) in South Paris. WCNM switched to CNN Headline News in July 2001 and is now hot adult contemporary station WIGY, while WKTQ became country music station WOXO in August 2016 and is now WPNO.

On March 8, 2017, WTME changed its format to sports, with programming from NBC Sports Radio. As a sports station, it carried Portland Pirates hockey, and Portland Sea Dogs baseball. On weekday mornings and middays, some Christian talk and teaching programs were also heard.

WTME, along with its sister stations, went off the air March 29, 2020, citing financial considerations that included expected reduction in advertising revenue attributed to COVID-19. The stations had been up for sale following the death of owner Dick Gleason in February 2019. A sale of the Gleason Media Group stations to Bennett Radio Group was announced in May 2020, and was consummated on August 5, 2020, at a sale price of $500,000.

On August 9, 2020, WTME changed its call letters to WIGY, and returned to the air on August 19, 2020, as a hot adult contemporary station, once again simulcast with WEZR (the former WCNM) and WPNO (the former WKTQ). It changed its callsign to WEZR on September 7, 2020. In 2021, the format shifted to classic hits, as "105.5 & 96.9 WIGY".

On October 26, 2021, WEZR and W252DS, along with WPNO and its translator, split from the simulcast with WIGY and flipped to conservative talk, branded as "The Patriot".

WEZR went off the air in October 2024, as its tower needed to be replaced. The Federal Communications Commission cancelled the station's license on November 20, 2025.
