= Fallout Boy =

Fall Out Boy or Fallout Boy may refer to:

- Fall Out Boy, a band from Illinois, United States
- Fallout Boy (The Simpsons), a fictional character from The Simpsons and Bongo Comics
- Vault-Tec's mascot, properly called "Vault Boy", from the Fallout media franchise

== See also ==
- Fall guy
