= Your Sparkling Death Cometh =

Studio album by Falling Up
- Released: June 28, 2011
- Recorded: February–May 2011
- Genres: Experimental rock, Christian rock
- Length: 56:28
- Label: Independent
- Producer: Jessy Ribordy

Falling Up chronology
Fangs (album) (2008)	Your Sparkling Death Cometh (2011)	Mnemos EP (2012)

Singles from Your Sparkling Death Cometh
- 1. ""Blue Ghost"" Released: May 25, 2011; 2. ""Diamnds"" Released: June 1, 2011

Your Sparkling Death Cometh is the fifth studio album and the first album independently released by the American experimental rock group Falling Up on June 28, 2011. The album was first announced on October 22, 2010, The band, having left their long-time record label, BEC Recordings, decided to stay independent and produce the album completely through fundraising. Falling Up's fundraiser for Your Sparkling Death Cometh finished On January 21, 2011, with the total amount received being $13,665, which was $3,665 higher than the original amount needed.

On March 18, 2011, Falling Up announced on their website that the upcoming album would be titled Your Sparkling Death Cometh, which was a significant departure from their previous album titles. As to the meaning behind the album, Falling Up has explained that "Your Sparkling Death Cometh is a title/album/idea that sometimes we all must go through the darkest cave to find the brightest light."

== Reception ==
Professional ratings
Review scores
Source	Rating
CM Addict	4/5 stars
Indie Vision Music	4/5 stars
Jesus Freak Hideout	5/5 stars 4.5/5 stars

Your Sparkling Death Cometh generally received very favorable reviews from critics. The album was cited as being exceptionally creative, with a strong focus on originality and composure. Jesus Freak Hideout gave the album five out of five possible stars, as did New Release Tuesday. CM Addict gave it a lower-than-perfect score of 8.5/10, citing that a couple of tracks "are just so-so." ChristianMusicZine.com gave the album a 4.5 out of 5, with reviewer Tyler Hess stating that "it appears so obvious that this is where Falling Up was destined to be, an independent band that has concocted some sort of jambalaya of synthesized indie rock and shoegaze music." IndieVision Music scored the album with nine out of ten possible stars, with author Joshua Clark's only complaint being that the vocals sound repetitive throughout the album.

== Track listing ==
On May 13, 2011 the official track-listing was released on the official site of the band. The track-listing is as follows:

1. Circadian - 7:21
2. The Wonder - 4:56
3. Blue Ghost - 5:06
4. Diamnds - 4:18
5. The Light Beam Rider - 4:34
6. Oceans - 5:58
7. Mscron -6:49
8. Vates - 5:22
9. Forms And Shapes - 5:31
10. Slow Waves - 6:41
1. Darkspeed (Bonus Track) - 7:01
2. The Mountain Machine (Bonus Track - BandCamp Only) - 1:45

=== Singles ===
Song	Year	Album	Peak Position - Top Christian Songs
"Blue Ghost"	2011	Your Sparkling Death Cometh	
"Diamnds"	2011	Your Sparkling Death Cometh	No. 27

== Personnel ==
- Jessy Ribordy — vocals, guitar, keyboards, composer, lyrics, producer, additional engineering
- Daniel Elder – guitar
- Jeremy Miller — bass, additional engineering
- Josh Shroy — drums, additional engineering, mixing

Additional personnel

- Dan Huttleston – additional electric guitar
- Casey Crescenzo – additional electric guitar, engineering, additional production
- Nick Lambert - electric guitars on track 10 and additional piano on track 5
- Jason Weirman and Melissa King - string musicians
- Max Tousseau - additional engineering and assistance
- Brad Blackwood - mastering
- Jesse Penico - design and layout
- Tracked and engineered at Casey Blue Studios, Canyon Lake, CA
- Mixed at The Castle House
- Mastered at Euphonic Masters
