= Falling Up (Falling Up album) =

2015 album by Falling Up

Studio album by Falling Up
- Released: November 13, 2015
- Recorded: February–September 2015
- Genre: Alternative rock; experimental rock; art rock
- Length: 63:42
- Label: Independent
- Producer: Jessy Ribordy

Falling Up chronology
Silver City (2013)	Falling Up (2015)

Falling Up is the ninth and final studio album from Falling Up. They released the album on November 13, 2015.

== Critical reception ==
Professional ratings
Review scores
Source	Rating
Jesus Freak Hideout	5/5 stars 4.5/5 stars
New Release Today	4.5/5 stars

Awarding the album a perfect five-star rating at Jesus Freak Hideout (JFH), David Craft stated, "Truthfully, this album is unmarketable, at least from a traditional standpoint. ... Only a band such as Falling Up could get away with this kind of game-winning Hail Mary."

Christopher Smith, also of JFH, gave the album four and a half stars, writing, "On Falling Up's self-titled final album, lead singer Jessy Ribordy's delicate, emotional vocals are paired with stunningly beautiful and dynamic experimental rock landscapes to create an otherworldly musical experience." Rating the album four and a half stars for New Release Today, Jonathan J. Francesco wrote, "This bittersweet goodbye is a triumphant finale to one of Christian music's true high art bands, and I'm proud to have been a fan."

Scott Fryberger, indicating in a four-and-a-half-star review for JFH, stated, "I can't recommend this album enough." Signaling in a five-star review at JFH, Wayne Reimer recognized that "losing Falling Up is an emotional blow for [him], personally, but they went out in a glorious blaze of flares".

Mark Rice, allocating four and a half stars to the album from JFH, stated, "This is the type of album that you cannot listen to multiple times without noticing something ingenious each time that you had failed to notice before."

== Track listing ==
All tracks are written by Jessy Ribordy.

No.	Title	Length
1.	"Boone Flyer"	5:51
2.	"Flora"	7:08
3.	"The Green Rider"	5:53
4.	"Hydro"	4:49
5.	"The Woodworker"	5:13
6.	"Wild Bird"	5:35
7.	"Typhoon"	4:13
8.	"In the Woodshop"	3:02
9.	"Rangers"	6:20
10.	"Up in Houses"	5:18
11.	"The Insect"	3:52
12.	"Flares"	6:28
Total length:		63:42

== Personnel ==
Falling Up

- Jessy Ribordy – vocals, guitar, piano, keyboards
- Daniel Elder – guitar, backing vocals
- Nick Lambert – guitar
- Jeremy Miller – bass guitar, keyboards
- Josh Shroy – drums, percussion, mixing

Production

- Stephen Pettyjon – mastering
- Luke Leasure – cover photo
- Brian Lambert – cover art
- Jeremy Miller – layout
