= Captiva (album) =

Studio album by Falling Up
- Released: October 2, 2007
- Recorded: 2007
- Genre: Experimental rock, electronic rock, pop punk, alternative rock
- Label: BEC
- Producer: Aaron Sprinkle

Falling Up chronology
Exit Lights (2006)	Captiva (2007)	Discover the Trees Again: The Best of Falling Up (2008)

Professional ratings
Review scores
Source	Rating
AllMusic	3.5/5 stars

Captiva is the third studio album from Christian rock band Falling Up, released on October 2, 2007. The band recorded the album with Seattle producer Aaron Sprinkle, who also handled the production duties for the band's debut, Crashings.

As opposed to the band's first two albums, Crashings and Dawn Escapes, Captiva is more alternative and experimental rock driven as a whole, similar to some elements that were present on Dawn Escapes, but much less hard rock-driven, and continues to show a change in the band's musical direction. It also features much less distorted guitar rhythms, and nearly all turntable effects present on previous albums are omitted. It is the final album to feature keyboardist Adam Taylor and only album with guitarist Micah Sannan, who would both depart from the group shortly before the album's release.

"Hotel Aquarium" was the album's first single. "Goodnight Gravity", "How They Made Cameras", "A Guide to Marine Life", and "Maps" have also been posted on the band's PureVolume page. The album reached the Billboard Top Christian albums chart peaking at No. 19 and reached the Top Heatseekers albums chart peaking at No. 7. It has sold just over 20,000 copies worldwide.

== Track listing ==
All tracks by Jessy Ribordy except where noted.

1. "A Guide to Marine Life" - 4:02
2. "Hotel Aquarium" (Ribordy, Aaron Sprinkle) - 2:45
3. "Goodnight Gravity" (Sprinkle) - 3:22
4. "Captiva" - 3:30
5. "Helicopters" - 3:50
6. "Maps" (Ribordy, Chris Stevens, Sprinkle) - 3:26
7. "How They Made Cameras" - 4:07
8. "Good Morning Planetarium" (Ribordy, Sprinkle) - 3:15
9. "Murexa" (Ribordy, Randy Torres) - 2:56
10. "Drago or the Dragons" - 4:23
11. "Arch to Achtilles" - 4:47
12. "The Dark Side of Indoor Track Meets" - 5:39

== Personnel ==
Falling Up

- Jessy Ribordy – lead vocals, rhythm guitar, keyboards, piano
- Micah Sannan – lead guitar
- Adam Taylor – keyboards, programming, backing vocals
- Jeremy Miller – bass guitar, backing vocals
- Josh Shroy – drums, percussion

Production

- Aaron Sprinkle - producer, engineer
- Randy Torres - engineer
- Chris Carmichael - string arrangements, performance, and recording
- Compound Recording, Seattle, Washington – recording location
- J.R. McNeely – mixing
- Elm South Studio, Franklin, Tennessee – mixing location
- Troy Glessner – mastering
- Spectre Studio – mastering location

== Singles ==
- "Hotel Aquarium"
- "Goodnight Gravity"
- "Good Morning Planetarium"
- "Maps"
