= Falls, West Virginia =

Unincorporated community in West Virginia, United States

- Unincorporated community
- Location within West Virginia Location within the United States
- Coordinates: 39°10′30″N 79°7′8″W
- Country: United States
- State: West Virginia
- County: Grant
- Elevation: 1,253 ft (382 m)
- Time zone: UTC-5 (Eastern (EST))
  - Summer (DST): UTC-4 (EDT)
- GNIS feature ID: 1549678

Falls is an unincorporated community in Grant County, West Virginia, United States. Its post office is closed.
