= Falling Up (band) =

American indie rock band

- The original six members of Falling Up (2004). From left to right: Josh Shroy, Tom Cox, Joseph Kisselburgh, Jessy Ribordy, Andrew Wadlow, Jeremy Miller

Background information
- Origin: Albany, Oregon, U.S.
- Genres: Alternative rock; electronic rock; experimental rock; electronica
- Years active: 2001–present
- Label: BEC
- Members: Jessy Ribordy; Jeremy Miller; Nick Lambert; Daniel Elder; Josh Shroy
- Past members: Tom Cox; Michael Humphrey; Joseph Kisselburgh; Adam Taylor; Micah Sannan; Andrew Wadlow

Falling Up is an American rock band from Albany, Oregon. Falling Up formed in October 2001 and released their debut album Crashings in 2004. They were signed to BEC Recordings in 2003 after a recommendation from friends in the band Kutless. Their lyrics were heavily inspired by their conundrums with spirituality.

Over time, the lyrics became more abstract and poetic as the band's style shifted from alternative rock to a more experimental direction and they started creating more diverse music.

The band went through several lineup changes, with only lead vocalist Jessy Ribordy, bassist Jeremy Miller, and drummer Josh Shroy appearing on every album. They became an independent band with the release of Your Sparkling Death Cometh in 2011.

== History ==
=== Crashings and Dawn Escapes (2004–06) ===
Falling Up debuted on February 24, 2004, with their 12-track album, Crashings. Produced by Aaron Sprinkle. Crashings sold 3,396 units in its first week, which exceeded first-week sales of any other album in the history of BEC Recordings—displacing the previous record held by Kutless, who were childhood friends of Falling Up. Crashings sold over 50,000 units by the end of 2004. Three songs from Crashings—"Broken Heart", "Escalates", and "Bittersweet"—reached No. 1 on the R&R charts.

Their second album, Dawn Escapes, was released on October 25, 2005, through BEC Recordings. Produced by Michael "Elvis" Baskette (Chevelle, Cold), the album, though more melodic and hard rock-driven as a whole, did not deviate far from the sound of Crashings. Dawn Escapes pushed Falling Up's lifetime record sales to over 150,000 by the summer of 2006. Guitarist Tom Cox left the band shortly before the album's release, eventually going on to form his own band, Archers Rise, whose debut release was produced by Ribordy. He was replaced by guitarist Micah Sannan.

On September 12, 2006, Falling Up released Exit Lights, an album featuring remixes of the band's biggest hits and the new song "Islander". Solomon Olds of Family Force 5, Thousand Foot Krutch's Trevor McNevan, and Randy Torres of Project 86 fame were among the artists who worked with Falling Up for the project. Guitarist Joseph Kisselburgh left the band in May 2006 to focus on his solo project, The Send, which released its debut album on Tooth & Nail Records in July 2007. The band enlisted a number of touring guitarists (including Hawk Nelson's Jonathan Steingard) to fill in for Kisselburgh during summer tour dates, although no permanent replacement was ever sought, with the group remaining a five-piece afterwards.

=== Captiva and Fangs! (2007–09) ===
The band announced the release date for their next project, code-named "Abandoners", on their Myspace page. Later on, they would announce the release name Captiva. The album was released on October 2, 2007. The first single from the album was "Hotel Aquarium", followed by "Goodnight Gravity", "How They Made Cameras", "Maps", and "A Guide to Marine Life". The band also filmed a music video for "Hotel Aquarium", which was featured in X 2008. After recording but before the release of the album, guitarist Micah Sannan departed Falling Up and joined the band Disciple. Keyboardist Adam Taylor also departed around the same time to manage merchandise for the band Hawk Nelson. Daniel Elder soon joined the band as their new guitar player, reducing the band to a quartet.

Falling Up's fourth studio album, Fangs!, was released March 24, 2009. According to their MySpace page, Fangs! was to be their "heaviest album yet", something which was often disputed in the post-release period. It was also said that the album would be "more of an arrangement than just a record that is put together randomly" and that it "[would] not have 14 great songs in entirety, but just intriguing moments and sections". One of the song titles, "Lotus and Languorous", was released early.

According to BEC Recordings and Falling Up's Myspace, Falling Up headlined the Fangs! tour in late April early May 2009 with Tooth and Nail artist Ruth and Portland indie/rock artist Archeology. Unlike past tours, the venues on this tour were strictly secular.

=== Side projects and hiatus (2009–10) ===
After the release of Fangs!, band members Jessy Ribordy and Josh Shroy started a side project under the name The River Empires, which created an album Epilogue with the help of The Dear Hunter's Casey Crescenzo and a handful of other musicians. Ribordy also began working on a solo project, Gloomcatcher, releasing its first album, Slow Chorale. The debut albums from both projects were released on April 6, 2010.

On January 20, 2010, Ribordy announced that Falling Up was "taking a permanent break" and that their final show would be held at the Parachute Music Festival on January 29.

=== Independent reunion and Your Sparkling Death Cometh (2010–12) ===
On October 22, 2010, the band updated their MySpace page with information that new music was "in the works". The website FallingUpLives.com was then launched, followed by a Kickstarter campaign. Jessy explained on the website that the breakup was due to the band members wanting to explore other musical endeavors and the fact the BEC did not support the band's ideas for future releases. Jessy also stated that the band members felt uncomfortable ending Falling Up so abruptly, leading to their decision to return making music, independently this time.

On January 21, 2011, Falling Up's Kickstarter campaign for their new album ended, having raised $13,665, more than their goal of $10,000. Rewards for the campaign included an exclusive download of two of Falling Up's demo songs, "Phantasm" and "Monster Blood", both of which were tracks cut from their Captiva album, an exclusive T-shirt, signed copies of the new record, and cover songs performed by the band. The new record began recording on February 9, 2011, with Ribordy saying that the album would be released in June of 2011. On March 18, 2011, the band's website was updated with a logo displaying Your Sparkling Death Cometh, and a release date of June 2011. Shortly after, the band confirmed on their Facebook page that "Your Sparkling Death Cometh" would be the title of the upcoming album.

On May 25, 2011, Falling Up released the first single for Your Sparkling Death Cometh, "Blue Ghost", on their ReverbNation page. On June 1, 2011, Falling Up released the second single, "Diamnds", also on their ReverbNation page. The two singles were generally well received, with "Diamnds" being a center point. Although not officially released until June 28, Your Sparkling Death Cometh reportedly arrived to those who had pre-ordered the album as early as June 23. When Your Sparkling Death Cometh was released on June 28, 2011, the album generally received very favorable reviews from critics. It was cited as being exceptionally creative, with a strong focus on originality and composure.

The same day as the release of Your Sparkling Death Cometh, Falling Up updated their website to fit with the theme of the album. A player was also added, allowing each track from the album to be played in its entirety. Prior to the album's release, the band members stated several times that, depending on the album's reception, it would likely be Falling Up's last project. With the album's release, they added a biography section to their website, which implied that they were hoping to continue Falling Up, even 10 years after its inception.

Following the release of Your Sparkling Death Cometh, Falling Up played their first live show since the Fangs! tour three years prior at the Hawthorne Theatre in Portland, Oregon, on January 7, 2012. Ruth and Water & Bodies were the opening acts for the band.

Falling Up announced in early January 2012 that a remix EP was in the works and also said that they were hoping to have some new music released by the end of the year. On April 11, 2012, the band released Mnemos, their first remix album since Exit Lights.

Mnemos contained seven tracks on its own, and there were also three bonus tracks added when the album reached 1,000 downloads. The tracks found on the album were not full remixes, but repetitions of hooks found in the various sections of Your Sparkling Death Cometh. At the time of Mnemos's release, Falling Up was only able to remix songs from Your Sparkling Death Cometh, due to BEC holding the rights to their previous songs.

The Mnemos EP was released on Groupees through the "Feed Them with Music" program, a charity which provides a meal for a needy family for every download. All of Falling Up's profits from the EP were donated to this program. Within the first 24 hours of the album's release there were over 1,500 downloads.

=== Machine De Ella, Falling Up, and Reimagined (2012–2017) ===
Falling Up's next project was teased as The Machine De Ella project. The project was eventually revealed to consist of two albums, Hours and Midnight on Earthship, as well as an audio book, also titled Hours, written by Jessy Ribordy. The idea for the project came when the band considered their two different fanbases. Hours was recorded as a concept album based on the book within the project, and was more rock-driven. Midnight on Earthship was toned down in style and contained more introspective and personal lyrics. Both of the albums and the book began their launch on October 9, 2012, and were progressively released over the course of three months.

In August 2014, Falling Up initiated a Kickstarter fundraiser for their tenth full-length album that raised over $48,000, exceeding the $40,000 goal. During the Kickstarter campaign, the band announced that the project would be their final album. On November 13, 2015, Falling Up released the album, the self-titled Falling Up to critical acclaim.

On June 10, 2016, Falling Up released a two-song EP titled Reimagined to follow through on a reward tier from their Kickstarter campaign. It consisted of two re-created songs, "Broken Heart" and "Arafax Deep", which originally debuted on the band's first album, Crashings. In early 2017, the band released their final song, a cover of Brand New's "Gasoline".

=== The Chilling Alpine Adventure (2024) ===
In August 2024, Falling Up announced a new project via their Instagram, titled The Chilling Alpine Adventure with the caption "The final chapter of a 20-year journey". In December 2024, Jessy Ribordy revealed via their new website that The Chilling Alpine Adventure is a project separate from Falling Up that will incorporate "old and beloved elements of Falling Up that fans have come to appreciate". Falling Up will serve as a "hallway" to the new project. The new project's album was released on December 27, 2024. On November 26, 2024, the band released the first song off the new project, titled "Five Angle". On July 24, 2025, the band released a bonus track, titled "Firn".

Drumming for the album was done by Jordan Wood of A Dream Too Late, who is credited with being the drummer on the project's official page. Josh Shroy has not been mentioned as being part of the project. According to Ribordy, bassist Jeremy Miller "didn't get a chance to track on the album" but is "just as much of this group as everyone else". Although Miller isn't credited with being "in the band" on the project's website. The bass parts were performed by Ribordy himself.

== Members ==
The Chilling Alpine Adventure

- Jessy Ribordy – vocals and bass guitar (2024–present)
- Daniel Elder – guitar (2024–present)
- Nick Lambert – guitar (2024–present)
- Jordan Wood – drums (2024–present)

Final lineup for Falling up

- Jessy Ribordy – lead vocals, guitars, keyboards, programming (2001–2024)
- Jeremy Miller – bass guitar, keyboards (2001–2024)
- Daniel Elder – guitar, backing vocals (2008–2024)
- Nick Lambert – guitar (2008–2024)
- Josh Shroy – drums, percussion (2001–2024)

Former Falling Up members

- Tom Cox – guitar, backing vocals (2001–2005)
- Joe Kisselburgh – guitar, backing vocals (2001–2006)
- Andrew Wadlow – turntables, keyboards, programming (2001–2003)
- Michael Humphrey – turntables, keyboards, programming (2003–2005)
- Micah Sannan – guitar (2005–2007)
- Adam Taylor – keyboards, programming, backing vocals (2005–2007)

Touring musicians

- Daniel Huddleston – lead guitar (2007–2010)

== Discography ==
- Crashings (2004, BEC)
- Dawn Escapes (2005, BEC)
- Exit Lights (2006, BEC)
- Captiva (2007, BEC)
- Discover the Trees Again: The Best of Falling Up (2008, BEC)
- Fangs! (2009, BEC)
- Your Sparkling Death Cometh (2011, independent)
- Mnemos EP (2012, independent)
- Hours (2013, independent)
- Midnight on Earthship (2013, independent)
- Silver City (2013, independent)
- House Full of Caverns (2015, independent)
- Falling Up (2015, independent)
- The Chilling Alpine Adventure (2024, independent)
- Reimagined Volume 1 (2026, independent)

== See also ==
- List of ambient music artists
