= Kevin Faller =

Irish poet and radio scriptwriter

Kevin Faller (1920–1983) was an Irish scriptwriter and poet.

Faller was born in Galway City. His paternal grandparents were German refugees from the Black Forest in Baden-Wuerttemberg, and had opened a jewellery shop in 1879 on Williamsgate Street, in the city centre.

He moved to Dublin in 1945, working with book publishers, on newspaper editorial staff and wrote radio scripts.

== Select bibliography ==
- Genesis (a novel), London, TV Boardman, 1953
- Lyrics, Dublin, Colm O’Lochlainn, 1963
- Lament for Bull Island and Other Poems, Dublin, The Goldsmith Press, 1973
- The Lilac Tree and Other Poems, Dublin, St Beuno's Press, 1979
- Memoirs: Collected Poems, Mornington, County Meath, Tracks, 1984
- Irish Poetry of Faith and Doubt:The Cold Heaven, ed. John F. Deane, Wolfhound Press, 1990.
