= Falls Township =

Falls Township may refer to:

- Falls Township, Cerro Gordo County, Iowa
- Falls Township, Chase County, Kansas
- Falls Township, Sumner County, Kansas
- Falls Township, Hocking County, Ohio
- Falls Township, Muskingum County, Ohio
- Falls Township, Bucks County, Pennsylvania
- Falls Township, Wyoming County, Pennsylvania
