= Falls Airport =

Falls Airport may refer to:

- Falls International Airport (IATA: INL) near International Falls, Minnesota
- Fergus Falls Municipal Airport (IATA: FFM) near Fergus Falls, Minnesota
