= Falling Down (disambiguation) =

Falling Down is a 1993 film by Joel Schumacher, starring Michael Douglas.

Falling Down may also refer to:

== Albums ==
- Falling Down (album), by Jehst

== Songs ==
- "Falling Down" (Atreyu song), 2007
- "Falling Down" (Duran Duran song), 2007
- "Falling Down" (Lil Peep and XXXTentacion song), 2018
- "Falling Down" (Oasis song), 2008
- "Falling Down" (Selena Gomez & the Scene song), 2009
- "Falling Down" (Space Cowboy song), 2009
- "Falling Down" (Sub Focus song), 2013
- "Falling Down" (Tears for Fears song), 1995
- "Falling Down", by 40 Below Summer from their 2000 album Invitation to the Dance
- "Falling Down", by Avril Lavigne from the 2002 soundtrack to the film Sweet Home Alabama
- "Falling Down", by Ben Jelen from his 2004 album Give It All Away
- "Falling Down", by Breaking Point from their 2001 album Coming of Age
- "Falling Down", by Chapterhouse from their 1991 album Whirlpool
- "Falling Down", by CunninLynguists from their 2003 album SouthernUnderground
- "Falling Down", by Dexter Freebish (2000)
- "Falling Down", by Edguy from their 1999 album Theater of Salvation
- "Falling Down", by The F-Ups (2003)
- "Falling Down", by For the Fallen Dreams from their 2008 album Changes
- "Falling Down", by James from their 2001 album Pleased to Meet You
- "Falling Down", by Joe Walsh from his 1974 album So What
- "Falling Down", by Kittie from their 2009 album In the Black
- "Falling Down", by Lisa Dalbello from her 1996 album whore
- "Falling Down", by Luna Halo from their 2007 self-titled album
- "Falling Down", by Muse from their 1999 album Showbiz
- "Falling Down", by MxPx from their 1995 album Teenage Politics
- "Falling Down", by Pennywise from their 2003 album From the Ashes
- "Falling Down", by Silverstein from their 2007 album Arrivals & Departures
- "Falling Down", by Staind from their 2003 album 14 Shades of Grey
- "Falling Down", by Stiff Little Fingers from their 1982 album Now Then...
- "Falling Down", by Story of the Year from their 2003 album Page Avenue
- "Falling Down", by Tom Waits from his 1988 album Big Time
- "Man on the Edge" (also known colloquially as "Falling Down", after the 1993 film of the same name that inspired it), by Iron Maiden from their 1995 album The X Factor

== See also ==
- Falling (disambiguation)
- Fall (disambiguation)
