= Henry Faller =

American publisher and author

- Born: Henry Conrad Faller; August 14, 1927; Newark, New Jersey, U.S.
- Died: March 21, 2012 (aged 84); Rockland, Maine, U.S.
- Resting place: Coughlin Cemetery, Rockland, Maine, U.S.
- Occupation: Printer
- Known for: Establishing Uncle Henry's
- Spouse: Helen Sonnenberg (1952–2012; his death)

Henry Conrad Faller (August 14, 1927 – March 21, 2012) was an American businessman. In 1970, he established Uncle Henry's, a classified advertisements repository, which later gained an online version. They are both active as of 2026.

== Early life ==
Faller was born in Newark, New Jersey, in 1927, the son of William and Cecilia. He graduated from Northeastern School of Taxidermy.

== Career ==
In 1945, Faller joined the U.S. Navy, in which he was stationed on the aircraft carrier the USS Shangri-La. After discharge, he worked at Studebaker Corporation in Russell Park, New Jersey. Faller began working at FMC Marine Colloids, before becoming assistant manager at F. W. Woolworth department store. He also worked briefly at J. J. Newberry's on Main Street in Rockland, Maine. Deciding he wanted to become a printer, he began apprenticeship at Bald Mountain Press in Rockland. Faller started his own printing establishment, the Village Print Shop, on Main Street in Rockland, in 1968. He printed the first edition of Uncle Henry's in 1970. The Fallers sold their business and retired in 1989.

== Personal life ==
Faller married Helen Sonnenberg in 1952, a year after they met, and the couple moved to St. George, Maine, to live and raise their family of three daughters and one son. He learned the art of glassblowing from an uncle, and some of his work was showing at the Museum of Fine Arts in Boston. He was also a sculptor, and his "Ballerina" was on display at Rockland's Farnsworth Art Museum. Faller was also a horse breeder, at one time owning four horses. He was a member of the Knights of Columbus, Council 136. Faller died in 2012, after due to Alzheimer's disease. His wife of sixty years, who co-founded Uncle Henry's, survived him by eleven years. She died in 2023, aged 92. They are both interred in Coughlin Cemetery in Rockland.
