= The Fall-Out =

2007 book by Andrew Anthony

The Fall-Out: How a Guilty Liberal Lost His Innocence
- Author: Andrew Anthony
- Publisher: Vintage Books
- Publication date: 2007
- ISBN: 9780224080774

The Fall-Out: How a Guilty Liberal Lost His Innocence is a book by Andrew Anthony. It was published in 2007 by Vintage Books.

Anthony writes: "Over the years, I had absorbed a notion of liberalism that was passive, defeatist, guilt-ridden. Feelings of guilt governed my world view: postcolonial guilt, white guilt, middle-class guilt, British guilt. But if I was guilty, 9/11 shattered my innocence... For while I realized almost straight away that 9/11 would change the world, it would be several more years before I accepted that it had also changed me."

== Reviews ==
Ahmed Iqbal in The Independent wrote, "The chapters are entitled Shock, Shame, Anger, Denial and Guilt – as if lifted from a textbook on popular psychology. The word "albeit" crops up throughout. The author's disillusionment with multiculturalism begins well before 9/11, when he reads a report on the future of cultural diversity in Britain compiled by men and women who are liberal in their outlook. It may sit well with Andrew Anthony to pronounce the death of multicultural society, but for those of us who have come here from other countries, multiculturalism cannot and must not fail."

John Lloyd wrote in The Observer, "The guilty liberalism he excoriates, in a book that retains a force and a passion and an insistence that you examine the thoughts you think that you think through some 300 finely written pages, is not a definition of the contemporary left, but a barrier to its development."

Nick Hornby in The Believer called it "A timely, pertinent, and brilliantly argued book about the crisis in left-liberalism."

Commentator Sunny Hundal, writing for The Guardian, described Anthony's view as "reductionist", adding that few people on the left actually hold the views being ascribed to them by the conservative writers who expound on the concept of "white guilt" and its implications. Hundal went on, "Not much annoys me more than the stereotype that to be liberal is to be full of guilt", this view, according to Hundal "cannot simply be painted as the crux of modern British liberalism", "maybe it's not surprising Andrew Anthony was willing to abandon liberal ideals so easily; he didn't seem to understand them in the first instance".

In this memoir, he recounts such episodes as a youthful excursion to Nicaragua to help the Sandinistas, Anthony Cape called it the best first-hand description of "the way comprehensive education and the right-on educational philosophies of 1970s schoolteachers let a bright boy from a poor background down," that he had ever read.

== Sources ==
- Lloyd, John (2 September 2007). "When the left wasn't right". The Observer.
- "Andrew Anthony: My book upset a few people - and now I'm a racist", The Independent, 5 October 2007
- Brian Donaldson, Review - The Fallout, The List (Issue 615), 16 October 2008
- Anthony Andrew's page on Randomhouse.co.nz
