= Overlake (band) =

Rock band from New Jersey, USA

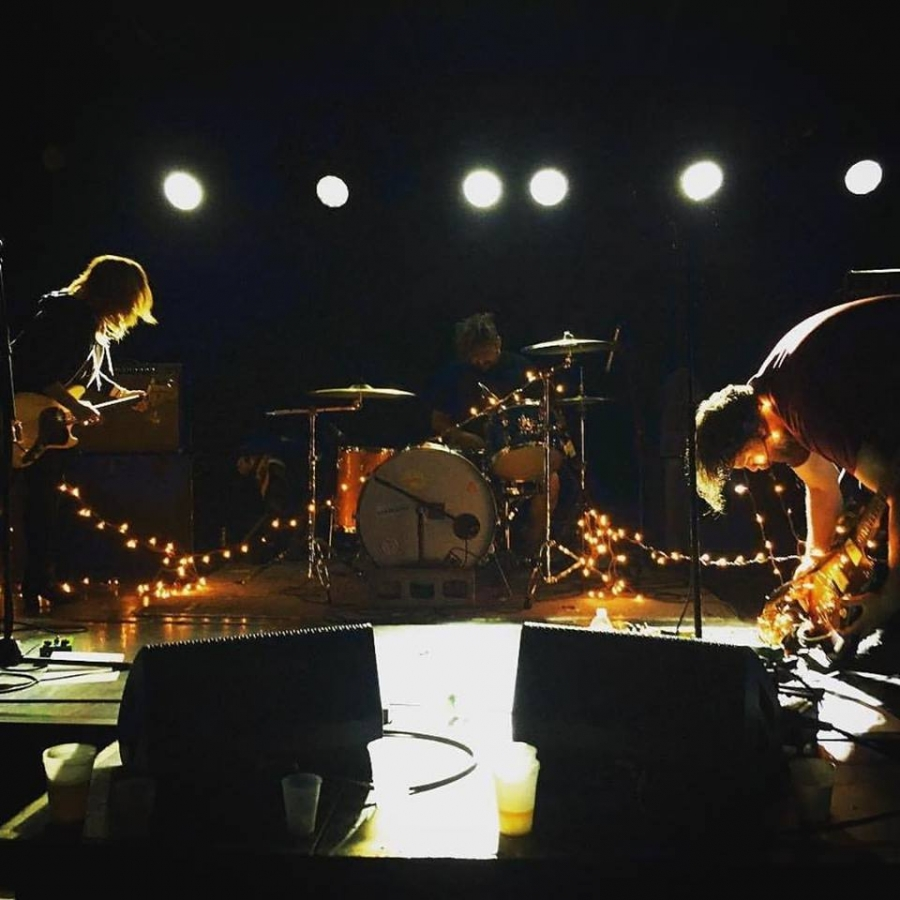
- Ovelake at the Gutter

Background information
- Origin: Jersey City, New Jersey, USA
- Years active: 2012-Present
- Labels: Bar/None Records, Killing Horse Records
- Members: Tom Barrett Lysa Opfer Nick D'Amore

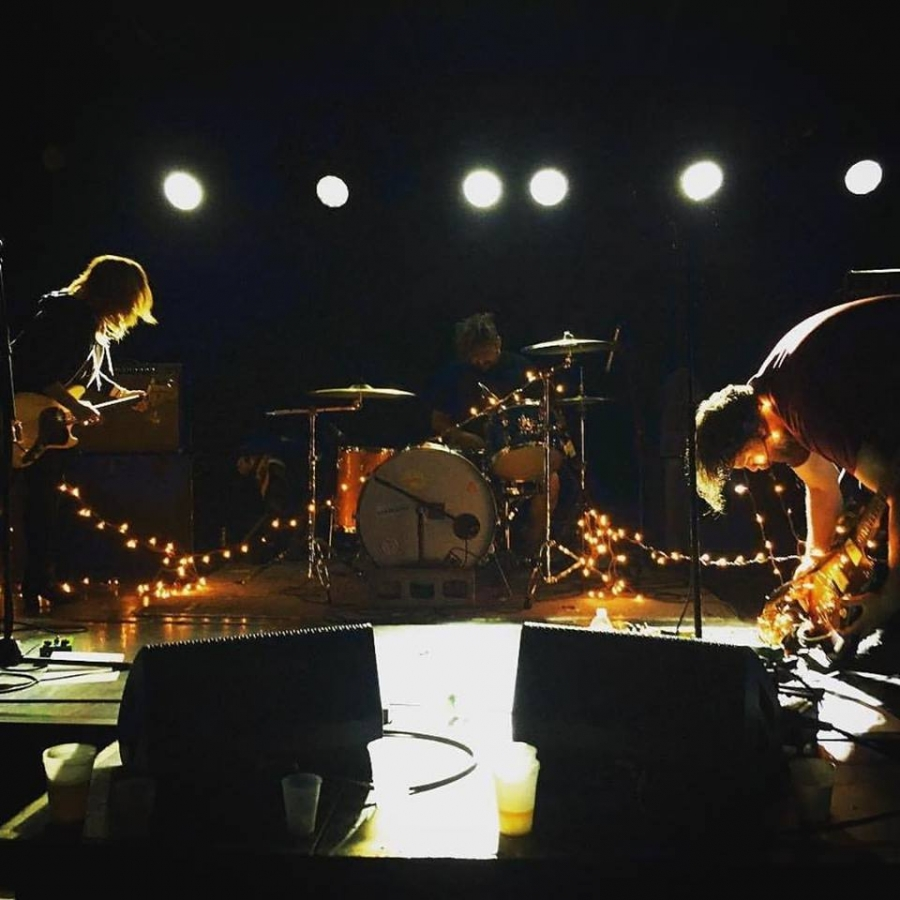
Overlake at The Gutter

Overlake is a shoegaze and indie rock trio from Jersey City, New Jersey.

== History ==
Overlake formed in 2012, when guitarist and vocalist Tom Barrett and bassist and vocalist Lysa Opfer, who were playing in another group, became friends over their mutual interest in 1990s bands, and decided to collaborate. Drummer Scotty Imp soon joined the duo to complete Overlake. Their music draws comparison to the bands My Bloody Valentine and Slowdive. In 2014, Overlake signed with the record label Killing Horse Records.

=== Killing Horse Records ===
Overlake released their debut album Sighs on compact disc and digital download on April 15, 2014, via Killing Horse Records. They performed at the 2014 South by Southwest music festival. Drummer Nick D'Amore joined the band three years later in 2015. They released "Travelogue" as a single on 7"-vinyl on October 30, 2015, also via the record label Killing Horse Records, and toured the South and Midwest of the United States extensively throughout 2016. The single was recorded and Mixed by Tom Beaujour at Nuthouse Recording in Hoboken, New Jersey in January 2015, and mastered by Joe Lambert at JLM Mastering in Jersey City, New Jersey.

=== Bar/None Records ===
After seeing a few Overlake concerts, Bar/None Records label owner Glenn Morrow signed them, in late 2016. Their second studio album Fall was released on compact disc and digital download on May 12, 2017, via Bar/None Records. Speaking about the album, Barrett said "I like that it's only eight songs because there are a couple of epics on it." The album was listed as a local worthy album in PopMatters' The Best Shoegaze and Dream Pop of 2017. In 2017, Overlake opened for the Brian Jonestown Massacre at Union Transfer in Philadelphia.

== Members ==
- Tom Barrett – guitar and vocals
- Nick D'Amore – drums
- Lysa Opfer – bass and vocals

=== Past members ===
- Scotty Imp – drums
- Paul Andrew – drums
- Mike DiTullio – drums

== Discography ==
Albums

- Sighs (2014)
- Fall (2017)

Singles

- "Travelogue" (2015)
- "Winter is Why" (2015)
