= Fallen (Vib Gyor song) =

Single by Vib Gyor
- Released: 17 July 2006
- Recorded: 2006
- Genre: Alternative rock
- Length: 4:50
- Label: Too Nice Recordings
- Songwriter: Vib Gyor

"Fallen" was the first single from the Leeds band Vib Gyor. It was first given limited release in July 2006, and has attained critical acclaim and a large amount of radio play on both sides of the Atlantic.

== About the single ==
The debut single "Fallen" was released 17 July 2006. Produced by Mike Cave at Liverpool's Parr Street Studios; it received airplay on both sides of the Atlantic. There has been a phenomenal response stateside, including regular airplay on KROQ-FM, KNRK, WEQX, Indie 103 and an interview and acoustic session on San Diego station 91X's The Big Break, a slot usually reserved for US talent. In the UK, Fallen has received regional & national airplay including by Zane Lowe at Radio 1, Phill Jupitus and Tom Robinson at BBC 6 Music & XFM; who have recently playlisted the track in Manchester, Scotland and London; a rare feat for an unsigned band, causing XFM DJ Clint Boon (of Inspiral Carpets fame) to state "This band are going to make a huge impact on the world of music. They are going to be massive."

== iTunes Single of the week 2009 ==
On May 26, 2009, a new version of Fallen was featured as 'Single of the Week' on iTunes It received over 250,000 downloads in under 48 hours and helped their debut album We Are Not an Island enter the iTunes top 100 albums at #47.

== Track listing ==
=== Limited Edition CD ===
1. Fallen (4:50)
2. How Long Have I Lost (5:08)
3. Fallen (radio edit) (3:50)

=== 7" vinyl ===
1. Fallen
2. How Long Have I Lost
3. Fallen (radio edit)
