= Fell (disambiguation) =

A fell is a mountain or upland area in northern England and other parts of Europe.

Fell may also refer to:

== Animals ==
- Fell pony, a British pony breed
- Fell Terrier, a breed of dogs
- Rough Fell (sheep), a breed of sheep

== Places ==
- Fell, Rhineland-Palatinate, a village in Germany
- Fell Exhibition Slate Mine, an exhibition mine in Germany
- Fell Township, Pennsylvania, a township in Pennsylvania
- Campsie Fells, in Central Scotland, northeast of Glasgow
- Cartmel Fell, a township in northern England
- Coniston Fells, the mountain as a whole and its summit; the slopes have names such as Tilberthwaite High Fell, Low Fell, and Above Beck Fells
- Criffel, in Galloway, Scotland
- Fellgate Metro station, on the Green line of the Tyne and Wear Metro network, serving the Fellgate and Hedworth residential areas of Jarrow, in South Tyneside, in North East England
- Goat Fell, the highest point on the Isle of Arran, Scotland
- List of fells in the Lake District
- Long Fell, in Galloway, Scotland
- Middlesex Fells Reservation, also called Middlesex Fells, a rocky highland just north of Boston, Massachusetts
- Peel Fell, in the Kielder Forest on the border between the Scottish Borders and Northumberland County, England
- Scafell, a massif in Yewbarrow, Wasdale, Cumbria
- Seathwaite Fell, the common grazing land used by the farmers of Seathwaite, Allerdale
- Snaefell, Isle of Man
- The Fells, the historic John Hay Estate in Newbury, NH, USA
- The Outlying Fells of Lakeland
- Wild Boar Fell, in Mallerstang Dale, Cumbria

== Arts, entertainment, and media ==
=== Literature ===
- Frederick Fell Publishers, Inc., a publisher from Florida
- Fell (novel), the name of the book that is a sequel to one of David Clement-Davies' books, The Sight
- Pictorial Guide to the Lakeland Fells (2003), a series of seven books by Alfred Wainwright, detailing 214 fells of the Lake District in northwest England
- Complete Lakeland Fells (1994), a guidebook by Bill Birkett, that lists 541 fells (see List of Birketts)

=== Music ===
- Fell (album), a 1996 album by Andrew Hulme and Paul Schütze
- Fell (music), a music genre performed by Goan Catholic men and women

=== Other uses in arts, entertainment, and media ===
- Fell (comics), a comic book written by Warren Ellis and illustrated by Ben Templesmith, published by Image
- Fell (film), a 2014 Australian film

== Sports ==
- Fell running, hill running and racing, off-road, over upland country where the gradient climbed is a significant component of the difficulty
- Fellwalking, hillwalking

== Trains ==
- Fell Diesel, the popular name for the British Rail 10100 locomotive (named after Lt. Col. L.F.R. Fell)
- Fell Locomotive Museum, Featherston, New Zealand
- Fell mountain railway system, a railway configuration using a raised centre rail (named after John Barraclough Fell)

== Other uses ==
- Fell (surname), a list of people with the last name Fell
- Fell, a manufacturer of transmission gearboxes
- Fell farming
- Fellgate, marks the road from a human settlement (such as Seathwaite, Allerdale) onto a fell
- Lord of the Fells, an ancient aristocratic title associated with the Lords of Bowland

== See also ==
- Fall (disambiguation)
