= Vib Gyor =

English rock band

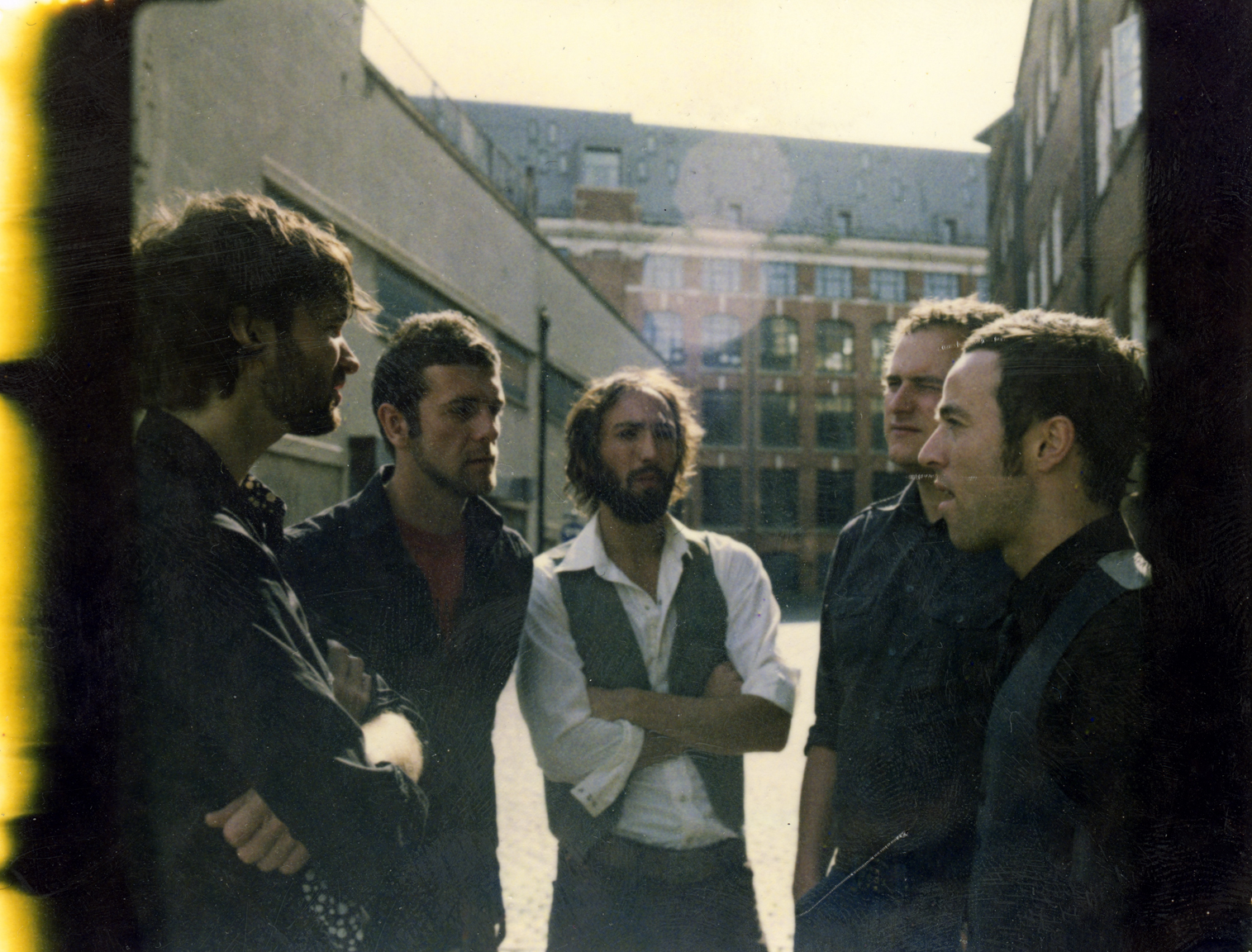

Background information
- Origin: Leeds, England
- Genres: Alternative rock, electronic, art rock, experimental
- Years active: 2004–2009
- Label: Unsigned
- Past members: Dave Fendick; Zane Keenan; Jonny Mulroy; Jonny Hooker; Dan Spooner; James Heggie
- Website: vibgyorband.com

Vib Gyor was an English rock band that was formed in Leeds, England, in 2004. The name was derived from the first letters of all the colours in the rainbow, in order from the shortest to longest wavelengths.

The band consisted of Dave Fendick (vocals, acoustic guitar), Zane Keenan (keyboards, guitar, backing vocals), Jonny Mulroy (guitar and effects), and Jonny Hooker (drums).

== The band ==
Their debut single "Fallen" was released on 17 July 2006. Produced by Mike Cave at Liverpool's Parr Street Studios, the track received airplay on both sides of the Atlantic. There was a good response stateside, including airplay on KROQ, KNRK, WEQX, Indie 103 and an interview and acoustic session on San Diego station 91Xs The Big Break—a slot usually reserved for US talent. In the UK, Fallen received regional & national airplay including by Zane Lowe at Radio 1, Phil Jupitus and Tom Robinson at BBC6 music & XFM, causing XFM DJ Clint Boon (of Inspiral Carpets fame) to announce "This band are going to make a huge impact on the world of music. They are going to be massive."

The Leeds-based band formed in 2004, Vib Gyor went on to perform at Glastonbury and Manchester's In The City music convention later that year. In summer 2006 they played at the launch night of XFM Manchester with Goldfrapp at the Manchester Ritz to a sell-out crowd. They also headlined the 2006 Leeds festival on the Sunday night (Topman unsigned stage). They have also drawn comparison with both Radiohead and Sigur Rós.

Vib Gyor released their second single on 5 March 2007. 'The Secret' was recorded by Paul Corkett (Muse, Radiohead) in his Studios in Bath. It is received airplay in the UK (BBC6 Music & XFM). In the USA the band were tipped as 'most likely to succeed in 2007' by Britsound and the single received airplay the same radio stations as Fallen had.

On 9 October 2007 lead singer Dave Fendick sent an e-mail to the Vib Gyor mailing list with information about the forthcoming Album.

"We are currently working on tracks for the debut album in the 'World Famous' Rockfield studios in South Wales, with legendary producer Ken Thomas (Sigur Rós, Maps, Hope of the States) . Although we will be temporarily breaking away to focus our attentions as our October Tour with our American brothers TRANSFER is fast approaching"

On 18 November 2007 the band announced via an e-mail to the Vib Gyor mailing list that Dan Spooner had left the band and that they would be searching for a new bassist for the band.

"I'm sad to announce that Dan has suddenly decided that he doesn't want to continue with Vib Gyor anymore. It has come as a bit of a shock to us all, but we fully support his decision and wish him the best of luck."

"We will be starting to look for his replacement ASAP."

2008 saw the band record their debut album We Are Not an Island, in their own studio in Elland, Leeds. This also saw the reintroduction of former bass player James Heggie, who contributed on bass, although he has not returned to the band in a full-time capacity. The album was released worldwide on 25 May 2009, exclusively on iTunes.

On 24 August 2010 it was announced via the e-mail mailing list and the official web-site that the group had disbanded 11 months previously, Zane was working on a solo project, and Jonny and Dave had been working on a new project Fossil Collective.

In 2011 the song "Red Lights" appeared in the French movie, The Intouchables.

== Former members ==
- Dave Fendick - vocals, acoustic guitars (2004–2009)
- Zane Keenan - keyboards, guitars, backing vocals (2004–2009)
- Jonny Mulroy - guitars, effects (2004–2009)
- Jonny Hooker - drums (2004–2009)
- Dan Spooner - bass (2004–2007)
- James Heggie - bass (2007–2009)

== Discography ==
=== Albums ===
- We Are Not an Island (25 May 2009)
- Lost Songs (11 October 2010)

=== EPs ===
- The Secret EP (5 March 2007)
- White EP (13 November 2007)

=== Singles ===
- Fallen (17 July 2006)

=== Demo releases ===
Release	EP1 - The Insomnia EP: Home recordings	EP2 - The Stalker EP: Home recordings	EP3: Home recordings	EP4 - New Songs (Promo Disk)
Track Listing	1. Permanent Disguise (Demo); 2. Time (Demo); 3. You Wear Me Out (Demo); 4. More (Demo); 5. Insomnia (Demo)	1. Fallen (Demo); 2. Church Bell (Demo); 3. The Stalker (Demo); 4. Long Way Down (Demo); 5. Ananomaly (Demo)	1. Always Alone (Demo); 2. The Secret (Demo); 3. Metamorphosis (Demo); 4. You Forget (Demo); 5. Ultimatum (Demo)	1. Rhombus Suit (Demo); 2. Tiny Daggers (Demo); 3. Evil Eye (Demo); 4. Red Lights (Demo); 5. Silence (Demo); 6. Momentum (Demo); 7. Winter (Demo); 8. The Experiment (Demo); 9. Quiet Ones (Demo); 10. How Long Have I Lost (Demo)
Year Of Release	2004	2005	2005	2006
