= Channel X Radio =

Network of radio stations in Maine, US

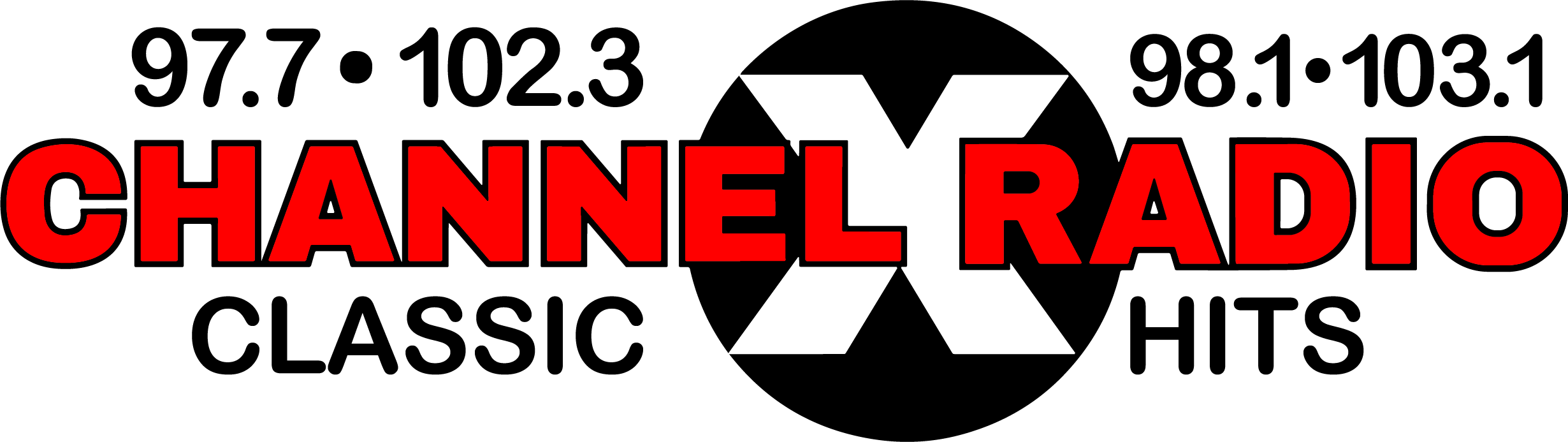
- Aroostook County, Maine; United States
- Frequency: 97.7, 98.1, 102.3, 103.1 MHz

Programming
- Format: Classic hits
- Affiliations: AP News

Ownership
- Owner: Bennett Radio Group, LLC
- Sister stations: WOXO-FM, WPNO, WIGY-FM, WIGY

History
- First air date: November 15, 1986

Links
- Webcast: Listen live (via Live365); Listen live (via MP3)
- Website: channelxradio.com

Channel X Radio is a network of radio stations in Aroostook County, Maine, United States. With studios in Caribou, the stations are heard through various transmitters throughout Aroostook County and broadcast a Classic hits format.

== History ==
The CanXus Broadcasting Corporation was founded in Maine in May 1986. Shortly after that, CanXus submitted an application to put a 3,000–watt transmitter on the Green Ridge Road, or on the Caribou/Fort Fairfield town line. On November 15, 1986 at 6:00 p.m., WCXU Caribou began operation on 97.7 MHz. The studios and offices were in a single-wide trailer while the transmitter was 400 feet away.

With a 3 kW signal and a small transmitter, people north of Caribou couldn't get the signal. Madawaska was the first place to get a satellite station. On January 30, 1988 WCXX 102.3 Madawaska began atop 11th Avenue Extension in a tiny studio, rebroadcasting WCXU. The signal reached all the way to Caribou.

Because of the valley-like nature, and the small power that WCXX transmits, the signal is degraded in most of Fort Kent. In late 1994, CanXus applied for W276AY on 103.1 MHz. This very small signal is located near the Northern Maine Medical Center and reaches only Fort Kent and surrounding towns. At the same time WCXU doubled its power to 6 kW, then later increased the output to 20 kW. Now the signal can go all the way to Houlton and Fort Kent in a 45 miles (70 km) radius. Since then, the transmitter building has doubled in size, the transmitter has become a little bigger (now Height Above Average Terrain (HAAT) of 90 m) and in 1998, Channel X moved to its new studio-office with state-of-the-art computerized broadcasting equipment.

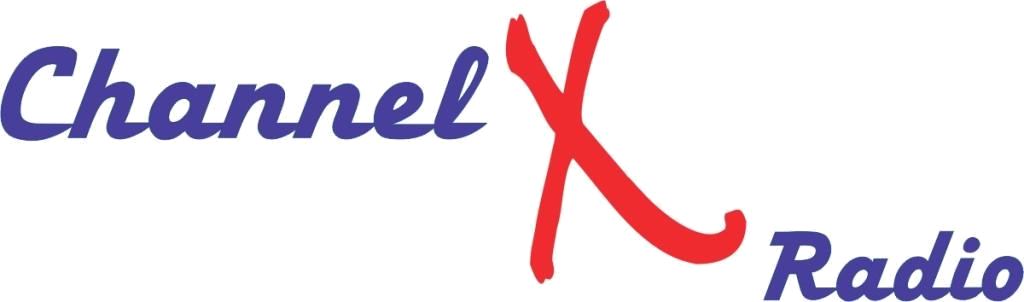
Logo used between 1986 and 2023, while owned by the CanXus Broadcasting Corporation

In late 2006 WCXV in Van Buren began to simulcast Channel X Radio. It broadcast at a lower power until December 27, 2007, when WCXV began broadcasting at the full 6 kW. Later, CanXus changed their construction permit to decrease its HAAT to 1 m.

In 2023, Bennett Radio Group acquired Channel X Radio from CanXus for $400,000.

On January 1st, 2024, the Station changed formats to Classic Hits.

== Programing ==
Under CanXus ownership, Channel X Radio offered a mix of adult contemporary, oldies, and local music. In 2024, under new management (the Bennett Radio Group), it changed formats to Classic Hits. It is home to one of the longest running oldies and retro music programs in the region. Furthermore, Channel X Radio covers local events and broadcasts live interviews from around the region. The station broadcasts local sports updates and news stories on a daily basis.

== Transmitters ==
Channel X Radio transmitters
Call sign	Frequency	City of license	Facility ID	ERP (W)	HAAT	Class	Transmitter coordinates	Founded
WCXU	97.7 FM	Caribou	65497	20,000	97 m (318 ft)	B	46°47′26.1″N 67°55′5″W	November 15, 1986
WCXX	102.3 FM	Madawaska	65498	1,200	129 m (423 ft)	B	47°19′51.1″N 68°20′24.2″W	January 30, 1988
W276AY	103.1 FM	Fort Kent	8555	50	−90 m (−295 ft)	D	47°15′55.1″N 68°35′32.1″W	—
WCXV	98.1 FM	Van Buren	76041	6,000	1 m (3 ft)	A	47°10′4.2″N 67°57′41.1″W	2006
