= WPNO =

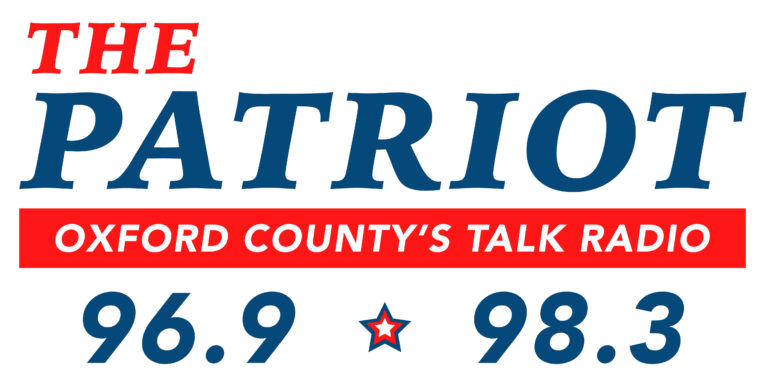
- South Paris, Maine; United States
- Broadcast area: Oxford County, Maine
- Frequency: 1450 kHz
- Branding: The Patriot

Programming
- Format: Conservative talk
- Affiliations: Fox News Radio; Westwood One; Motor Racing Network

Ownership
- Owner: Bennett Radio Group; (Bennett Radio Group, LLC)
- Sister stations: WOXO-FM; WIGY-FM; WIGY; Channel X Radio

History
- First air date: October 28, 1955
- Former call signs: WKTQ (1955–1973); WKTP (1973–1976); WXIV (1976–1981); WOXO (1981–1986); WKTQ (1986–2016); WOXO (2016–2019)

Technical information
- Licensing authority: FCC
- Facility ID: 52176
- Class: C
- Power: 1,000 watts unlimited
- Transmitter coordinates: 44°13′16.25″N 70°31′41.22″W
- Translator: 96.9 W245CQ (South Paris)

Links
- Public license information: Public file; LMS
- Website: thepatriot.me

WPNO (1450 AM) is a radio station licensed to serve South Paris, Maine. The station is owned by Bennett Radio Group. WPNO airs a conservative talk format. WPNO also operates translator station W245CQ (96.9 FM) in South Paris. WPNO went on the air in 1955 as WKTQ, and was assigned its present call letters on September 26, 2019.

== History ==
WPNO signed on October 28, 1955, as WKTQ under the ownership of Oxford Broadcasting Corporation. In its early years, WKTQ's programming included news, music, and sports. The station affiliated with the Mutual Broadcasting System in June 1965, and switched to ABC Radio's Entertainment network in 1972. By this point, WKTQ had a variety format that included 42 hours a week of country music. The call letters were changed to WKTP in 1973.

Richard Gleason, owner of WOXO (92.7 FM) in Norway, bought WKTP for $130,000 in 1976 and changed its call letters to WXIV. The station had a country music format at the time; by 1977, WXIV had changed to a top 40 format, with 80 percent of the programming simulcast on WOXO. WXIV's call letters were changed to WOXO on November 23, 1981; the station continued to simulcast with WOXO-FM, which changed to a country music format that year. Later in the 1980s, the station shifted to religious programming; this programming was simulcast on WTME (1530 AM) in Auburn, which Gleason purchased in 1985. The call letters were changed back to WKTQ on January 15, 1986. The simulcast on WTME moved to 1240 AM in Lewiston in 1990, after Gleason acquired that facility and shut down the 1530 AM transmitter. WLLB (790 AM) in Rumford began simulcasting WKTQ and WTME in 2001, following Gleason's purchase of that station; later that year, WLLB took the WTME call letters from 1240 (which became WCNM and, in 2007, WEZR) and moved to 780 AM.

WKTQ returned to the WOXO call letters on August 1, 2016; at that time, the station began to simulcast on W245CQ (96.9 FM) and took on the country music format previously heard on WOXO-FM, which changed its call letters to WEZR-FM and began simulcasting WEZR's hot adult contemporary format. WOXO and W245CQ concurrently inherited the existing simulcast of the country format on WTBM (100.7 FM) in Mexico, which took on the WOXO-FM call sign. In April 2019, WOXO and W245CQ split from the simulcast with WOXO-FM and began simulcasting the hot adult contemporary format of WEZR under the "Z105.5 & 96.9" branding; the country music format concurrently moved back to WEZR-FM. The call sign became WPNO on September 26, 2019.

WPNO, along with its sister stations, went off the air March 29, 2020, citing financial considerations that included expected reduction in advertising revenue attributed to COVID-19. The stations had been up for sale following the death of owner Dick Gleason in February 2019. A sale of the Gleason Media Group stations to Bennett Radio Group was announced in May 2020.

Bennett Radio Group's purchase, at a price of $300,000, was consummated on August 5, 2020. On August 19, 2020, WPNO, along with WEZR and WTME, returned to the airwaves with a relaunched hot adult contemporary format, branded as "WIGY". The format would later shift to classic hits with the brand "105.5 and 96.9 WIGY".

On October 26, 2021, WPNO and W245CQ, along with WEZR (the former WTME) and its translator, flipped to conservative talk as "The Patriot", effectively splitting from its simulcast of WIGY after two years.

== Translator ==
Call sign	Frequency	City of license	FID	ERP (W)	Class	Transmitter coordinates	FCC info
W245CQ	96.9 FM	South Paris, Maine	145614	250	D	44°12′24.2″N 70°33′16.2″W	LMS
