= WIGY (AM) =

Radio station in Lewiston, Maine

- Lewiston, Maine; United States
- Broadcast area: Lewiston–Auburn
- Frequency: 1240 kHz
- Branding: 105.5 & 95.7 WIGY

Programming
- Language: English
- Format: Oldies

Ownership
- Owner: Bennett Radio Group; (Bennett Radio Group, LLC)
- Sister stations: Channel X Radio; WIGY-FM; WOXO-FM; WPNO

History
- First air date: August 21, 1938
- Former call signs: WCOU (1938–1988); WXGL (1988–1991); WTME (1991–2001); WCNM (2001–2007); WEZR (2007–2020)

Technical information
- Licensing authority: FCC
- Facility ID: 11031
- Class: C
- Power: 1,000 watts (day); 860 watts (night)
- Transmitter coordinates: 44°6′55.26″N 70°14′53.2″W
- Translators: 95.7 W239ET (Lewiston); 105.5 W288CW (Lewiston)

Links
- Public license information: Public file; LMS
- Webcast: Listen live
- Website: wigyradio.com

WIGY (1240 kHz) is an AM radio station owned by Bennett Radio Group that is licensed to serve Lewiston, Maine. WIGY airs an oldies radio format. In addition to music, WIGY broadcasts Lewiston–Auburn area high school sports.

== History ==
Logo as "Maine's Big Z", used from 2016 until 2019

The station was assigned the WEZR call letters by the Federal Communications Commission on January 18, 2007. On March 31, 2014, WEZR began simulcasting on 105.5 FM, via translator W288CW, and rebranded as Z105.5. On August 1, 2016, the station began simulcasting on WEZR-FM 92.7 (formerly WOXO-FM, whose country music format was transferred to 1450 AM and 96.9 FM), expanding the format's reach to the Oxford Hills area; as a result, the station rebranded to "Maine's Big Z". In April 2019, WEZR rebranded as "Z105.5 & 96.9", reflecting the move of its Oxford Hills simulcast from WEZR-FM to WOXO (now WPNO).

WEZR, along with its sister stations, went off the air March 29, 2020, citing financial considerations that included expected reduction in advertising revenue attributed to COVID-19. The stations had been up for sale following the death of owner Dick Gleason in February 2019. A sale of the Gleason Media Group stations to Bennett Radio Group was announced in May 2020.

Logo under previous slogan from 2020 until 2026

Bennett Radio Group's purchase, at a price of $300,000, was consummated on August 5, 2020. On August 19, 2020, WEZR and WPNO returned to the air as they relaunched the hot AC format as "WIGY", while adding a simulcast on the former WTME (which would take on the WEZR call sign). The call sign for 1240 AM was changed to WIGY on September 7, 2020.

== Translator ==
Call sign	Frequency	City of license	FID	ERP (W)	HAAT	Class	Transmitter coordinates	FCC info
W239ET	95.7 FM	Lewiston, Maine	200149	250	0 m (0 ft)	D	44°12′16.8″N 70°33′9.2″W	LMS
W288CW	105.5 FM	Lewiston, Maine	152283	250	58.2 m (191 ft)	D	44°6′54.2″N 70°14′50.1″W	LMS
