= WOXO-FM =

Country music radio station in Norway, Maine

- Norway, Maine; United States
- Broadcast area: Lewiston–Auburn
- Frequency: 92.7 MHz
- Branding: WOXO Country 92.7 & 100.7

Programming
- Format: Country music

Ownership
- Owner: Bennett Radio Group; (Bennett Radio Group, LLC)
- Sister stations: WPNO; WIGY-FM; WIGY; Channel X Radio

History
- First air date: December 12, 1970
- Former call signs: WNWY-FM (1970–1976); WOXO (1976–1981); WOXO-FM (1981–2016); WEZR-FM (2016–2019)
- Former frequencies: 105.5 MHz (1970–1974)

Technical information
- Licensing authority: FCC
- Facility ID: 67698
- Class: C3
- ERP: 5,200 watts
- HAAT: 244 meters (801 ft)
- Transmitter coordinates: 44°17′47.2″N 70°37′3.2″W

Links
- Public license information: Public file; LMS
- Webcast: Listen live (via Live365); Listen live (via MP3)
- Website: woxo.com

WOXO-FM (92.7 FM, "WOXO Country 92.7 & 100.7") is a radio station licensed to serve Norway, Maine, United States. Established in 1970 as WNWY-FM, the station is owned by Bennett Radio Group. WOXO-FM broadcasts a country music format, and simulcasts on Mexico sister station WIGY-FM 100.7.

== History ==
WOXO-FM signed on December 12, 1970, as WNWY-FM under the ownership of Oxford Hills Radio Communications. The station originally operated on 105.5 FM with a middle of the road format. By 1974, WNWY had moved to 92.7 FM, a change made to accommodate the move of Skowhegan station WTOS-FM from 107.1 to 105.1, and was programming contemporary music, country music, pop, and gold.

Richard Gleason, the general manager of WSKW and WTOS in Skowhegan, bought WNWY-FM for $120,000 in 1975; the following year, the call letters were changed to WOXO to reflect the station's service to Oxford County and the Oxford Hills. By 1978, WOXO's top 40 format was 80-percent simulcast with WXIV (1450 AM) in South Paris, which Gleason acquired in 1976. In 1981, WOXO dropped the top 40 format in favor of country music after Gleason conducted a survey that found that a country-formatted station would be highly rated. WOXO-FM's country format was simulcast on 1450 AM, which had taken on the WOXO call letters, until the early 1980s, when the AM station shifted to religious programming; in 1986, that station changed its call letters to WKTQ. In 1990, Gleason bought WTBM (100.7 FM) in Mexico; that station then became a simulcast of WOXO-FM.

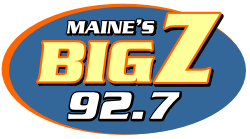
Logo as "Maine's Big Z"

WOXO-FM's country format moved to WKTQ, which took on the WOXO call letters, on August 1, 2016. Concurrently, the station changed its call letters to WEZR-FM and began simulcasting the hot adult contemporary format of Lewiston sister station WEZR (1240 AM), expanding that station's reach to serve the entirety of the Western Maine Mountains region and parts of Carroll County, New Hampshire, and the WOXO-FM call letters were transferred to WTBM, which continued to air WOXO's country music programming. In April 2019, WEZR-FM returned to simulcasting country music with WOXO-FM, with the simulcast of WEZR's hot adult contemporary programming moving to WOXO (AM) (now WPNO). The move back to country increased competition for the country audience in the Lewiston-Auburn market with heritage outlet WTHT along with North Conway, New Hampshire-based WPKQ (which switched to a WCYY simulcast in 2021). On September 27, 2019, the WOXO-FM call sign was moved back to 92.7, with 100.7 briefly taking on the WEZR-FM call sign before changing to WRMO-FM.

WOXO-FM, along with its sister stations, went off the air March 29, 2020, citing financial considerations that included expected reduction in advertising revenue attributed to COVID-19. The stations had been up for sale following the death of owner Dick Gleason in February 2019. A sale of the Gleason Media Group stations to Bennett Radio Group was announced in May 2020.

Bennett Radio Group's purchase, at a price of $300,000, was consummated on August 5, 2020. On August 10, 2020, WOXO-FM returned to the airwaves by its new owners.
