= Falling =

Falling or fallin' may refer to:

- Falling (physics), movement due to gravity
- Falling (accident)
- Falling (execution)
- Falling (sensation)

== People ==
- Christine Falling (born 1963), American serial killer who murdered six children

== Books ==
- Falling (Provoost novel), a 1994 novel by Anne Provoost
- Falling (Howard novel), a 1999 novel by Elizabeth Jane Howard
- Falling (Newman novel), a 2021 novel by T. J. Newman
- "Falling", a 1967 poem by James Dickey

== Film and television ==
=== Films ===
- The Falling (1987 film), an American film by Deran Sarafian
- Falling (Dutch: Vallen), a 2001 film by Hans Herbots based on the novel by Anne Provoost
- Falling (2008 film), a film by Richard Dutcher
- The Falling (2014 film), a British film by Carol Morley starring Maisie Williams and Florence Pugh
- Falling (2015 film), a film starring Adesua Etomi and Blossom Chukwujekwu
- Falling (2020 film), an American-British-Canadian drama film starring Lance Henriksen and Viggo Mortensen
- Falling (2026 film), a film by Colin Krisel and James Krisel

=== TV series ===
- Falling, a 2005 ITV adaptation of the novel by Elizabeth Jane Howard
- Falling (2026 TV series), a British romantic drama by Jack Thorne

=== TV episodes ===
- "Falling" (Off the Air), a 2012 TV episode
- "Falling" (Supergirl), a 2016 TV episode

== Music ==
=== Albums ===
- Falling (Blue Peter album), 1983
- Falling (Praga Khan album), 2001

=== Songs ===
==== Falling ====
- "Falling" (Alison Moyet song), 1993
- "Falling" (Ant & Dec song), 1997
- "Falling" (Boom! song), 2001
- "Falling" (Bruce Guthro song), 1998
- "Falling" (Candice Alley song), 2003
- "Falling" (Cathy Dennis song), 1993
- "Falling" (Gravity Kills song), 1998
- "Falling" (Haim song), 2013
- "Falling" (Harry Styles song), 2019
- "Falling" (Julee Cruise song), 1990
- "Falling" (LeBlanc and Carr song), 1977
- "Falling" (Melba Moore song), 1986
- "Falling" (Montell Jordan song), 1996
- "Falling" (Trent Harmon song), 2016
- "Falling" (Trevor Daniel song), 2018
- "Falling", by Alesso, 2017
- "Falling", by Anette Olzon from Shine, 2013
- "Falling", by Brooke Hogan from The Redemption, 2009
- "Falling", by the Cat Empire from Cinema, 2010
- "Falling", by Crooked Colours from Tomorrows, 2020
- "Falling", by D'espairsRay from Monsters, 2010
- "Falling", by Duran Duran from Future Past, 2021
- "Falling", by Florence and the Machine from Lungs (deluxe edition), 2009
- "Falling", by Gotthard from Domino Effect, 2007
- "Falling", by HÖH and Current 93 from Island, 1991
- "Falling", by James Iha from Let It Come Down (remastered edition), 1999
- "Falling", by Jamiroquai from Synkronized, 1999
- "Falling", by Julian Marsh featuring Abigail, 2003
- "Falling", by Kylie Minogue from Kylie Minogue, 1994
- "Falling", by Lacuna Coil from Lacuna Coil, 1998
- "Falling", by Lauren Jauregui from Prelude, 2021
- "Falling", by Little River Band from The Net, 1983
- "Falling", by Lyra, 2019
- "Falling", by Mercenary from 11 Dreams, 2004
- "Falling", by Mike Posner from 31 Minutes to Takeoff, 2010
- "Falling", by Montell Jordan from More..., 1996
- "Falling", by the Naked and Famous from Simple Forms, 2016
- "Falling", by Norther from Circle Regenerated, 2011
- "Falling", by Olivia Newton-John from Physical, 1981
- "Falling", by the Raybon Brothers from Raybon Brothers, 1997
- "Falling", by Roy Orbison, 1963
- "Falling", by Slowthai from Ugly, 2023
- "Falling", by Sonic Syndicate from Confessions, 2016
- "Falling", by Staind from Chapter V, 2005
- "Falling", by Tina Turner from Twenty Four Seven, 1999

==== Fallin' ====
- "Fallin'" (Alicia Keys song), 2001
- "Fallin'" (Chris Brown song), 2026
- "Fallin'" (Connie Francis song), 1958
- "Fallin'" (Demy song), 2012
- "Fallin'" (Jessica Mauboy song), 2017
- "Fallin'" (Teenage Fanclub and De La Soul song), 1993
- "Fallin'" (Why Don't We song), 2020
- "Fallin'", a song by Jay-Z from American Gangster
- "Fallin'", from the musical They're Playing Our Song, 1978, covered by Sarah Geronimo

== Other ==
- Falling (game), a card game created by James Ernest

== See also ==
- Fall (disambiguation)
- Fallin (disambiguation)
