= WIGY-FM =

Country music radio station in Mexico, Maine

Simulcast of WOXO-FM, Norway, Maine
- Mexico, Maine; United States
- Broadcast area: Oxford County, Maine
- Frequency: 100.7 MHz
- Branding: WOXO Country 92.7 & 100.7

Programming
- Format: Country

Ownership
- Owner: Stan Bennett; (Bennett Radio Group, LLC)
- Sister stations: WIGY; WOXO-FM; WPNO; Channel X Radio

History
- First air date: September 15, 1988
- Former call signs: WTBM (1987–2016); WOXO-FM (2016–2019); WEZR-FM (2019); WRMO-FM (2019–2020)

Technical information
- Licensing authority: FCC
- Facility ID: 46323
- Class: C3
- ERP: 850 watts
- HAAT: 388 meters (1,273 ft)
- Transmitter coordinates: 44°34′56.2″N 70°37′57.2″W

Links
- Public license information: Public file; LMS
- Webcast: Listen live (via Live365); Listen live (via MP3)
- Website: woxo.com

WIGY-FM (100.7 FM) is a radio station licensed to serve Mexico, Maine. The station is owned by Stan Bennett, through licensee Bennett Radio Group, LLC. Established in 1988 as WTBM, WIGY-FM broadcasts a country music format, which it simulcasts with WOXO-FM 92.7.

== History ==
WIGY-FM signed on September 15, 1988, as WTBM, owned by Tanist Broadcasting Corporation and programming country music, album-oriented rock, and adult contemporary music. Mountain Valley Broadcasting bought WTBM in 1990 and converted it to a simulcast of WOXO-FM 92.7. The station took on the WOXO-FM call letters on August 1, 2016; the call sign became available to 100.7 after the 92.7 FM facility became hot adult contemporary station WEZR-FM, with WOXO's country music programming airing on 100.7 FM and on WOXO (1450 AM and 96.9 FM).

In April 2019, the country format moved from WOXO back to WEZR-FM, retaining the simulcast on WOXO-FM. On September 27, 2019, the WEZR-FM call sign moved to 100.7, with 92.7 returning to WOXO-FM; on October 8, 100.7's call sign was changed to WRMO-FM.

WRMO-FM, along with its sister stations, went off the air March 29, 2020, citing financial considerations that included expected reduction in advertising revenue attributed to COVID-19. The stations had been up for sale following the death of owner Dick Gleason in February 2019. A sale of the Gleason Media Group stations to Bennett Radio Group was announced in May 2020, and was consummated on August 5, 2020, at a sale price of $300,000.

On August 9, 2020, WRMO-FM changed its call letters to WIGY-FM; it returned to the air on August 10, once again simulcasting WOXO-FM as "WOXO Country".
