= BlackBoxWarrior – OKULTRA =

2020 song by Will Wood

- Cover art for the live version

Song by Will Wood

from the album The Normal Album
- Released: July 10, 2020
- Recorded: 2019
- Genre: Dark cabaret; pop rock; jazz
- Length: 4:54, 4:51 (2024 edit), 9:32 (live)
- Label: Say-10
- Songwriter: Will Wood
- Producer: Jonathon Maisto

Audio
- "BlackBoxWarrior – OKULTRA" on YouTube

"BlackBoxWarrior – OKULTRA" is a song by American musician Will Wood. It was released through Say-10 on July 10, 2020, as the seventh song on his third studio album, The Normal Album (2020). The song features a theatrical dark cabaret composition with lyrics themed around mental struggles. A performance video was released on September 10, 2020, followed by a live version as the lead single of Slouching Towards Branson (2025). The track has been positively received for its energy and intricate production.

== Background ==
In early 2017, Will Wood began performing the song "Black Box Warrant" live, featuring it as a bonus track of his live album The Real (2018). Wood found the song to be one of the hardest to produce for his third studio album, The Normal Album (2020), requiring more melodic precision than his previous work and experimentation to find a practical method of performance. Wood wrote it about the struggle to control and understand human minds even with professional and medicinal assistance, calling the experience as "being a narcissistic gorilla in jeans, a bra, and arbitrary cultural straightjackets". "BlackBoxWarrior – OKULTRA" was revealed as the seventh song on the tracklist of The Normal Album in May 2020, and was released on July 10 through Say-10.

On September 10, a performance video featuring Wood's full band was released. It uses a black and white color grading, filmed at GD PonderRosa Studios in Lafayette, New Jersey. The song's bridge monologue is turned into a spoken word interlude for the performance, spoken through an old landline telephone built by co-engineer Kevin Guillorn. It was the final incorporation of the performance, with Wood feeling it assisted the song's theme of mental suppression. On December 21, 2025, a version of the song titled "The Black Box Warrior vs. The Pants (The Bitter End NYC)" was released as the sole single of the live album Slouching Towards Branson (2025), featuring an interjected story about a psychedelic experience shortly after the release of "In case I make it," (2022).

== Reception ==
Jordan Blum of PopMatters described the song as "part classical vaudevillian ode, part madcap spoken-word skit", praising its ability to encompass Wood's artistry and comparing it to the styles of Rufus Wainwright and Diablo Swing Orchestra. Joshua Nelson of Bleeding Cool complimented the track in a review of The Normal Album, lauding it as "a rousing and upbeat rag". Live performances of "BlackBoxWarrior – OKULTRA" during the Mr. Wood is Dead Tour in 2025 turned the bridge monologue into an interactive experience with the audience, with a call and response system described by Emily Sisson of My Global Mind to be one of the show's most theatrical moments.

== Personnel ==
Credits adapted from the album's liner notes.

- Will Wood – lead vocals, piano, keyboards, ukulele, marimba, glockenspiel
- Matt Berger – alto saxophone, clarinet, flute
- Vater Boris – upright bass, bass guitar
- Mike Bottiglieri – acoustic guitar, electric guitar
- Mario Conte – drums, percussion
- Richard Cush – trombone
- Seamus Ronan – baritone saxophone
- Robert Schaefer – trumpet
- Victoria Goettel – viola
- Spencer Daniele – didgeridoo
- Jonathon Maisto – production, recording engineer, mixing, mastering
- Kevin Antreassian – mixing, mastering (2024 mix)
- Kevin Guillorn – additional engineering
