= The Normal Album =

2020 album by Will Wood

Studio album by Will Wood
- Released: July 10, 2020
- Recorded: 2019
- Studios: Backroom, Rockaway, New Jersey; Ponderosa, Lafayette, New Jersey; SOMD, Beltsville, Maryland
- Genres: Pop rock; new wave; disco; jazz; doo-wop; ska; dark cabaret
- Length: 45:52
- Label: Say-10 Records
- Producers: Jonathon Maisto; Matt Squire

Will Wood chronology
The Real Will Wood (Music from the Award-Winning Concert Film) (2020)	The Normal Album (2020)	Camp Here & There: Original Series Soundtrack (2021)

Singles from The Normal Album
- 1. "Love, Me Normally" Released: May 29, 2020; 2. "Laplace's Angel (Hurt People? Hurt People!)" Released: June 12, 2020; 3. "...Well, Better Than the Alternative" Released: June 26, 2020

The Normal Album is the third studio album by American musician Will Wood, released on July 10, 2020, by Say-10 Records. It was produced by Jonathon Maisto, who also produced his first album, Everything is a Lot. The album was financed in part by a crowdfunding campaign, which met its goal in its first day.

== Background ==
In 2016, Will Wood began receiving treatment for Bipolar II disorder. This improved his mental state, leading to him approaching his songwriting differently with inspiration from it. While developing his third album, Wood began adapting a different mindset from his previous projects. Citing maturity, a stronger skillset, and funding as reasons, he undertook new methods of writing and composing, focusing on the theme of conformity.

The album's songs were primarily written on piano, with these recordings receiving adaptations from Wood's band. In an interview with Bleeding Cool, Wood cited Green Day as his largest melodic influence. He additionally stated an intention to move into folk music after The Normal Album, which would become "In case I make it," (2022). The album was partly financed by a crowdfunding campaign on Indiegogo, as well as by subscribers to Will Wood's Patreon page. The Indiegogo campaign reached its funding goal within a day of its launch, going on to raise nearly $28,000.

== Cover artwork ==
The cover artwork of The Normal Album shows Will Wood wearing a muted outfit with a pink shirt, patterned tie, and a solid black suit and pants. He appears standing at a window with black shutters on a white house, with his eyes slightly enlarged through Adobe Photoshop. This photo was taken by Angelica Pasquali, while the house was picked out by Wood with Mike Diebold. Various poses were photographed, with the final choice being of Wood waving out from the window. Wood edited this image's contrast, making it pale while surrounding it by a dark retro-pattern border with crumbled text. This stylistic choice is intended to translate Wood's sense of humor, self-describing the album art as "a piece of black comedy".

== Release ==
"Love, Me Normally" was released as the album's lead single on May 29, 2020, with a music video being published on the same day. Wood described the song as a "50's doo-wop 80's power ballad", with production by Matt Squire. The rest of the album was produced by Jonathan Maisto, including the following single and music video "Laplace's Angel (Hurt People? Hurt People!)" on June 12. Collector Cole Mozelesky legally provided Wood with real human remains for the video, which were then animated with stop motion. The song itself incorporates avant-pop and jazz, relying on guitar and brass instrumentation.

The third and final single was "...Well, Better Than the Alternative", released on June 26. Its accompanying music video was animated by Patreon member Sorin Michaels with EBsynth, editing live footage of Wood. The album was released on July 10, 2020, through Say-10. The label distributed it digitally and physically on CD, cassette, and vinyl. Two weeks later, Will Wood published a video for "2econd 2ight 2eer (That Was Fun, Goodbye.)". In it, visual effects artist Terrence Holleran utilizes visual feedback between a camcorder, television, videocassette recorder, and TV studio control board to create analog distortion.

On August 18, "Marsha, Thankk You for the Dialectics, but I Need You to Leave" received a lyric video created by Angelica Pasquali, featuring varied imagery with a scientific focus alongside visual representations of the lyrics. On September 5, an in-studio live recording was released for the song, filmed in black-and-white at GD PonderRosa Studios in Lafayette, New Jersey. This was followed by a live recording of "BlackBoxWarrior – OKULTRA" five days later. The latter performance turns the song's bridge monologue into a spoken word interlude, with Wood speaking it through an old landline telephone.

== Legacy ==
The Normal Album was followed a year later by the documentary "What Did I Do? (The Making of the Normal Album)". The documentary depicts an "abstract reconstruction" of the album's creation, and is Wood's second documentary, following The Real Will Wood.

== Reception ==
Jordan Blum of PopMatters wrote that The Normal Album "explores themes of normality, identity, morality, and other psychological traits", and called it "a thrilling mix of genres"; Blum highlighted the song "BlackBoxWarrior – OKULTRA" as being "a great glimpse into Wood's bold and brilliant aesthetic". Bleeding Cool's Joshua Nelson additionally gave the album a positive review, noting the "sardonic bite" and varying moods of its tracks.

== Track listing ==
All tracks are written by Will Wood.

No.	Title	Length
1.	"Suburbia Overture": "Greetings from Mary Bell Township!"; "(Vampire) Culture"; "Love Me, Normally"	6:16
2.	"2econd 2ight 2eer (That Was Fun, Goodbye.)"	3:26
3.	"Laplace's Angel (Hurt People? Hurt People!)"	4:01
4.	"I / Me / Myself"	4:51
5.	"...Well, Better Than the Alternative"	4:15
6.	"Outliars and Hyppocrates: A Fun Fact About Apples"	4:12
7.	"BlackBoxWarrior – OKULTRA"	4:54
8.	"Marsha, Thankk You for the Dialectics, but I Need You to Leave"	5:19
9.	"Love, Me Normally"	5:44
10.	"Memento Mori: the most important thing in the world"	2:49
Total length:		45:52

== The New Normal! ==
The New Normal! (The Normal Album 2024 Edit)

Remix album by Will Wood
- Released: August 9, 2024
- Recorded: 2019
- Studios: Backroom, Rockaway, New Jersey; Ponderosa, Lafayette, New Jersey; SOMD, Beltsville, Maryland
- Genres: Pop rock; new wave; disco; jazz; doo-wop; ska
- Length: 1:00:08
- Label: Say-10 Records
- Producers: Kevin Antreassian; Matt Squire

Singles from The New Normal! (The Normal Album 2024 Edit)
- 1. "I / Me / Myself (2018 Live in Studio Demo)" Released: July 26, 2024; 2. "Laplace's Angel (2018 Live in Studio Demo)" Released: July 29, 2024

In 2024, Wood announced that a new mix of The Normal Album was in production. On July 26, a 2018 demo of "I / Me / Myself" became its lead single. It was then followed by 2018 demos of "Laplace's Angel" and "Memento Mori". On August 9, The New Normal! (The Normal Album 2024 Edit) was released to streaming services, featuring the three demos and new mixes of The Normal Album. However, "Love, Me Normally" remains unaltered due to being mastered by Matt Squire rather than Jonathon Maisto, preventing Wood from mixing it for "contractual reasons".

=== Track listing ===
The New Normal! (The Normal Album 2024 Edit)
No.	Title	Length
1.	""Blue Velvet" Reboot Starring Tom Waits (Suburbia Overture 2024 Edit)"	6:20
2.	"Second Sight Seer! S! (2222024 Edit)"	3:27
3.	"The Moral Implications of a Deterministic Universe feat. The Onceler (Laplace's Angel 2024 Edit)"	4:04
4.	"I / Me / Myself (2024 Edit)"	4:52
5.	"...Well, Better Than the Alternative (Better Alternative Edit)"	4:17
6.	"I Lied About the Apple Thing (Skeleton-Bones Edition)"	4:15
7.	"Ideas Only Spread Because People Like Them, the "Free Market of Ideas" is not a Meritocracy, it's a Set of Unhealthy Coping Skills and a Corporate Oligarchy, Wake Up, Man! Don't Let the Lies Dim Your Light! Anyway This One's Black Box Warrior (2024 Edit)"	4:52
8.	"Karen, Thannsdfghjkl You for the Casserole, but I Need You to Lea-n into a Typo (Marsha 2024 Edit)"	5:20
9.	"Love, Me Normally"	5:44
10.	"A Knee-Slapping Joke Title Referring to How Ending Tracks on Will Wood Albums Are Always Kind of Like That (Memento Mori 2024 Edit)"	2:52
11.	"I / Me / Myself (2018 Live in Studio Demo)"	5:01
12.	"Laplace's Angel (2018 Live in Studio Demo)"	4:24
13.	"Memento Mori (2018 Live in Studio Demo)"	4:42
Total length:		1:00:08

== Personnel ==
Credits adapted from the album's liner notes.

Musicians

- Will Wood – lead vocals, piano, keyboards, ukulele, marimba, glockenspiel
- Matt Berger – alto saxophone, clarinet, flute (all tracks), bass vocals (1, 3)
- Vater Boris – upright bass, bass guitar
- Mike Bottiglieri – acoustic guitar, electric guitar
- Mario Conte – drums, percussion
- Richard Cush – trombone
- Seamus Ronan – baritone saxophone
- Robert Schaefer – trumpet
- Victoria Goettel – viola
- Spencer Daniele – didgeridoo

Technical

- Jonathon Maisto – production, recording engineer, mixing, mastering
- Kevin Antreassian – mixing, mastering (2024 mix)
- Kevin Guillorn – additional engineering
- Matt Squire – production, mixing, and engineer (9)
- Angelica Pasquali – album art photography
- Mike Diebold – inner sleeve art
- Will Wood – inner sleeve art, album art graphic design
