= Slouching Towards Branson =

- DVD cover of the film.
- Directed by: Jacob Feldman
- Written by: Will Wood
- Produced by: Will Wood
- Starring: Will Wood
- Edited by: Jacob Feldman
- Music by: Will Wood
- Production company: White Rat Studios
- Distributed by: Hostile City Distribution; MVD Entertainment Group
- Release dates: August 15, 2025 (Patreon); August 7, 2026 (U.S.)
- Running time: 106 minutes
- Country: United States
- Language: English

Slouching Towards Branson is a 2025 American comedy special and concert film written and performed by alternative musician Will Wood. The film serves as a chronicle of Wood's return to performing after a multi-year hiatus, framing live sets from his Slouching Towards Bethlehem tour within a semi-fictionalized narrative. The title of the special is a direct parody of Joan Didion's 1968 essay "Slouching Towards Bethlehem", a literary allusion Wood references throughout. It originally premiered as a digital exclusive on Wood's Patreon platform on August 15, 2025, followed by a live audio soundtrack release to streaming platforms on December 24, 2025, as well as releases on major streaming platforms on September 23, 2026. The film was released on DVD via Hostile City Distribution and MVD Entertainment Group on August 7, 2026. Upon release, the film received mostly positive reviews from critics.

== Synopsis ==
Slouching Towards Branson is presented as a hybrid between stand-up comedy and concert film. The narrative, which Wood describes in the film as "about as true as a true story can be while still being a story", explores the psychological distress following the sudden fame from his viral 2020 hit "I/Me/Myself" and what Wood describes in the film as "[His] big dramatic hiatus announcement and subsequent anticlimactic return to the stage."

However, the core plot centers around a semi-fictionalized road trip taken during this hiatus following a psychedelic mushroom trip. Accompanied by his partner, Christina, and an injured pet rat named Casper, Wood travels to Branson, Missouri to attend a corporate timeshare presentation solely to collect the financial incentives being offered by the company.

The film uses concert footage from Wood's 2024 Slouching Towards Bethlehem tour, wherein Wood weaves 10 songs from his discography into the narrative. However, the film utilizes aggressive splicing techniques, match cuts, and chapter breaks, breaking the illusion of a single continuous performance. The film uses these techniques to simulate conversations between characters, emphasize parts of stories, and convey thematic elements.

== Release ==
Prior to the film's release, Wood posted to his YouTube channel a "prologue" featuring a cut scene from the film and an extra live performance of "The Main Character" off his fourth studio album, "In case I make it,". The film originally premiered on Wood's Patreon page on August 15, 2025. Months later, an audio version of the album was released on December 24, 2025, on streaming services. The audio version was preceded by one single, "The Black Box Warrior vs. The Pants", which released on December 21, 2025. On August 7, 2026, Hostile City Distribution and MVD Entertainment Group released the film on DVD.

== Track listing ==
All tracks are written by Will Wood.

Slouching Towards Branson (Audio Version)
No.	Title	Length
1.	"Slouching Towards Bethlehem"	3:48
2.	"The Black Box Warrior vs. The Pants (The Bitter End NYC)"	9:32
3.	"Slingshot Through the Poconos in the Batmobile!"	1:34
4.	"6up 5oh Copout (The Bitter End NYC)"	4:01
5.	"Into the Sunset with No Goodbyes"	1:44
6.	"Cicada Days (The Bitter End NYC)"	4:36
7.	"A Man in New Pants"	3:56
8.	"Against the Kitchen Floor (The Bitter End NYC)"	5:30
9.	"Revelations"	3:50
10.	"And if I Did, You Deserved It (Pittsburgh Winery)"	3:54
11.	"A Man for Whom the World as he Understood it No Longer Existed"	4:46
12.	"The Christian Las Vegas is Not Holding"	3:51
13.	"2econd 2ight 2eer (Pittsburgh Winery)"	3:49
14.	"Salvation"	6:27
15.	"Memento Mori (Chameleon Lounge, Spokane)"	3:48
16.	"The Service"	2:57
17.	"Things Fall Apart"	9:55
18.	"Laplace's Angel (Aladdin Theater, Portland OR)"	4:15
19.	"Slingshot Through the Ozarks in the Subaru!"	2:24
20.	"The Live Entertainment Capital of the Entire Universe is not Holding"	2:24
21.	"Well, Better than the Alternative (World's Largest Windchime, Casey, IL)"	4:14
22.	"Slouching Towards Branson"	3:28
23.	"White Noise (The Bitter End NYC)"	4:40
Total length:		1:39:31

== Critical reception ==
The film has received mostly positive reviews. Alex Gold, writing for Desert Sounds Mag, described the film as a "triumphant return" and praised its "genre-defying chaos that refuses every attempt at easy categorization" as well as Wood's "gift for finding comedy in existential dread." Writing for Salt House Creative, Daniel Widdowson referred to the film as "A philosophical spiral disguised as standup" with "Humour that is as intellectual as it is disarming." In a more mixed review, Del Pike writing for V13.net described the show as "unique" and described Wood as "likeable and quirky enough to hold your attention" but also wrote that the emotional impact of some stories "fall flat" and the show may feel "a tad overlong". Christopher Gonda, also writing for V13, called it "maximally creative and innovative." Kacie Fuller of KJHK called a live performance of Slouching "side-splitting" and "thought provoking and beautiful." The film received many small independent film festival awards.
