= You Liked This (Okay, Computer!) =

2022 single by Will Wood

Single by Will Wood

from the album "In case I make it,"
- Released: June 10, 2022
- Genre: Spoken word
- Length: 2:11
- Label: Say-10
- Songwriter: Will Wood
- Producer: Will Wood

Will Wood singles chronology
"Cicada Days" (2022)	"You Liked This (Okay, Computer!)" (2022)	"Euthanasia" (2022)

Music video
- "You Liked This (Okay, Computer!)" on YouTube

"You Liked This (Okay, Computer!)" is a song by American musician Will Wood. It appears as the tenth song on his fourth studio album "In case I make it," (2022), released through the Say-10 record label as the fourth single on June 10, 2022. The track is spoken word and features Bev Standing reading buzzwords and phrases prevalent in social media. It is instrumentally backed by dark piano and electronic noise, with its corresponding music video showcasing avant-garde 3D imagery.

== Background ==
In 2021, Will Wood took inspiration from Radiohead's song "Fitter Happier" from the album OK Computer (1997) to create a black comedy dystopian monologue, focused on the capability of artificial intelligence to build user profiles and its technique of manipulating consumers. He then sent this to Bev Standing, whose voice was allegedly non-consensually used as a text-to-speech voice by TikTok until she sued the company in the same year. She accepted Wood's script, reading it multiple times to be edited together.

Following the single "Cicada Days" in May 2022, Wood began teasing the release of the new song on YouTube. With the announcement, he expressed hatred for social media and its ability to "destabilize and manipulate users", worsening the mental health of modern youth. Wood picked the song as a single for the reason of wanting to create a video around it, holding the goal of artistic gratification over generating advertising revenue or selling copies of the album. The single was published on June 10. On "In case I make it," (2022), it appears as the tenth song, which is followed by "The Main Character" as a thematic successor.

== Composition ==
"You Liked This (Okay, Computer!)" begins with Standing narrating with predatory corporate language and buzzwords. This is backed with electronic noises that mirror Radiohead's styling from OK Computer (1997). Shortly into the song, Wood introduces piano with an uneasy composition, described by Jessica Young of Voice Magazine to be reminiscent of music from Tim Burton's films. The piano becomes more dramatic and somber as it progresses. Joe Hoeffner of Two Story Melody described the track as a TikTok-era version of Radiohead's song "Fitter, Happier".

== Music video ==
A music video co-directed by Will Wood and Jim Horvath, with 3D animation by the latter, was released for "You Liked This (Okay, Computer!)" on June 10, 2022.

The video was written by Wood and Horvath as a story, contrasting Wood's prior live performance music videos. Wood took inspiration from the music videos of Tool and Radiohead while writing for "You Liked This (Okay, Computer!)".

== Personnel ==
- Bev Standing – vocals
- Will Wood – instruments, production
- Kevin Antreassian – mixing, mastering
