= ...Well, Better Than the Alternative =

2020 single by Will Wood

Single by Will Wood

from the album The Normal Album
- Released: June 26, 2020
- Recorded: 2019
- Genre: Pop rock; new wave; jazz
- Length: 4:14, 4:16 (2024 edit)
- Label: Say-10
- Songwriter: Will Wood
- Producer: Jonathon Maisto

Will Wood singles chronology
"Laplace's Angel (Hurt People? Hurt People!)" (2020)	"...Well, Better Than the Alternative" (2020)	"Mr. Fregoli and the Diathesis-Stress Supermodel, Or: How I Learned to Stop Worrying and Love the Con (An Untitled Track)" (2020)

Music video
- "...Well, Better Than the Alternative" on YouTube

"...Well, Better Than the Alternative" (stylized as ...well, better than the alternative) is a song by American musician Will Wood. It was released via Say-10 on June 26, 2020, as the third single for his third studio album, The Normal Album (2020). It features an up-tempo pop composition with piano and ukulele. A music video was released alongside the single, featuring paintings of Wood animated with a program called EBsynth.

== Background ==
In 2016, Will Wood was inspired by an emotional connection to the Netflix series Stranger Things to write a song about it, focusing on British actress Millie Bobby Brown's portrayal of Eleven in the series. He began performing it in early 2017 as "Still Pretty (Millie Rolls a 7)". Shortly after his second studio album, Self-ish (2016), Wood would often jokingly refer to a fictional daughter named Millie, as part of a tendency at the time to fictionalize his life to an implausible extent. He later revealed he was making a reference to Brown.

Once Wood began writing and producing material for his third studio album, The Normal Album (2020), he considered the song the easiest to produce for having demos made long in advance. Wood then renamed the song as "...Well, Better Than the Alternative", stating its relevance to the song's meaning and that he preferred it over its former title. It was revealed as the fifth song on the tracklist for The Normal Album in May 2020.

=== Composition ===
"...Well, Better Than the Alternative" is an upbeat song, with avant-pop piano melodies juxtaposing the track's lyrics. Its instrumentation builds throughout, climaxing during the final chorus with Addison Herron-Wheeler of New Noise Magazine describing it as "Wood's vocal performance tak[ing] on an anguished energy". It was produced by Jonathon Maisto, with Wood noting its tonal difference from his other work. The song's meaning is intentionally ambiguous; some lyrics act as "conceptual red herrings" to obstruct Wood's intention, making fan interpretations varied.

== Music video ==
A music video for "...Well, Better Than the Alternative" was released alongside the single on June 26, 2020. The video begins with footage of Wood playing a video game, later transitioning into a painted rendition of the same shot with a shadowed figure behind him. Throughout the song, Wood and the figure are depicted in various actions and poses with paintings overlaying them as a filter-esque animation. During the bridge, Wood offers a game controller to the figure, which results in the two interacting together for the rest of the song.

The video was created by Will Wood and Chris Dunne in collaboration with Sorin Michaels, a subscriber of Wood's Patreon. The latter frequently shared fan-made animations of previous Will Wood and the Tapeworms music videos with the Patreon community, which led to Wood hiring Michaels to revolve a new video around the animation style. Dunne, who previously co-created The Real Will Wood (2020), filmed scenes of Wood in his unfurnished home for the video, which had key frames painted over by Wood and Michaels. The latter used EBsynth to apply the handmade paintings to live action footage of Wood, making it appear animated. Wood edited the animated footage together, finalizing the video for "...Well, Better Than the Alternative".

== Personnel ==
- Will Wood – lead vocals, piano, ukulele, backing vocals
- Jonathon Maisto – production, recording engineer, mixing, mastering
- Matt Berger – alto saxophone
- Vater Boris – bass guitar
- Mike Bottiglieri – guitar
- Mario Conte – drums
- Victoria Goettel – viola
