= Éalú =

2025 point-and-click video game

- The banner of the game, as seen on Steam.
- Developer: Beyond The Bark
- Publisher: Beyond The Bark
- Composer: Will Wood
- Engine: Unity
- Platform: Windows
- Release: October 2, 2025
- Genres: Point & click adventure game
- Mode: Single-player

Éalú (Irish for "escape") is a point-and-click stop motion adventure game created by Limerick, Ireland-based indie game studio Beyond The Bark. It is a spiritual successor to the song "Tomcat Disposables", taken from the 2022 album "In case I make it," composed by American singer-songwriter Will Wood. The game was released for Windows on October 2, 2025.

== Gameplay ==
The story is supposed to be an alternative, happier ending to "Tomcat Disposables" from Wood's album "In case I make it,". The player character, a mechanical mouse, begins going through a maze that they must escape from. Éalú's main gameplay mostly features point and click based puzzles. There is a heavy emphasis on death, as there are many monsters that can kill the player and even a tally for the number of deaths the player encounters.

== Development ==
The game was developed by a four-person team: Ivan Owen, a staff member at Beyond The Bark who contributed to design and writing; Benjamin Orr, who worked on design, programming, and writing; Will Wood, who composed the music and assisted with writing; and JT Paton, who served as the game's illustrator and promotional artist. The game itself was made entirely using stop-motion animation, all hand animated by Ivan Owen. It was inspired by the repetition of daily life.

At the Irish film festival "Dingle Animation", Éalú was selected to be screened under the category "Game Trailers", along with 20 other games. It was screened on March 22, 2025. The game was scheduled for and promptly released on October 2, 2025 for Windows.

It was originally created back in September of 2024 as an interactive story on TikTok, but the videos have now been taken down.

== Reception ==
The game was praised for its unique animation style, frame-by-frame stop-motion technique and hand-crafted sets made from wood, generally accepted well. Some reviewers described it as "cute" and "lovely-looking", with "unique look and sense of atmosphere."
