= Toxic (song) =

2004 single by Britney Spears

Single by Britney Spears

from the album In the Zone
- B-side: "Me Against the Music"
- Released: January 13, 2004
- Recorded: 2003
- Studio: Murlyn (Stockholm); Record Plant (Los Angeles)
- Genre: Dance-pop; techno-pop; breakbeat; disco
- Length: 3:19
- Label: Jive
- Songwriters: Cathy Dennis; Christian Karlsson; Pontus Winnberg; Henrik Jonback
- Producer: Bloodshy & Avant

Britney Spears singles chronology
"Me Against the Music" (2003)	"Toxic" (2004)	"Everytime" (2004)

Music video
- "Toxic" on YouTube

"Toxic" is a song by American singer Britney Spears, released as the second single from her fourth studio album, In the Zone (2003). It was written and produced by Bloodshy & Avant, with additional writing from Cathy Dennis and Henrik Jonback. A dance-pop and techno-pop song with elements of South Asian music, "Toxic" features varied instrumentation, such as drums, synthesizers and surf guitar. It is accompanied by breathy vocals and high-pitched strings, sampled from the 1981 Bollywood song "Tere Mere Beech Mein" by Laxmikant–Pyarelal. The lyrics of "Toxic" draw an extended metaphor of a lover as a dangerous and addictive drug.

"Toxic" received acclaim from critics, who praised its hook and chorus, with many deeming it among the highlights of the album. It won Best Dance Recording at the 47th Annual Grammy Awards, marking the only Grammy win of Spears' career. The song charted at number one in Australia, Canada, the Czech Republic, Hungary, Ireland, Norway, Peru, Portugal, Scotland, and the United Kingdom. Joseph Khan directed an accompanying music video, which includes references to Blade Runner, The Seven Year Itch and John Woo films. It features Spears as a secret agent who poisons her boyfriend, and includes scenes of Spears naked with diamonds on her body. Following the Super Bowl XXXVIII halftime show controversy, the video was deemed too racy for MTV and was moved to late-night programming.

Spears has performed "Toxic" in live appearances, including the 2004 NRJ Music Awards and three of her concert tours. It was the opening number of the Onyx Hotel Tour (2004), where she sang atop a bus wearing a black catsuit. Spears also performed remixed versions of "Toxic" at the Circus Starring Britney Spears (2009), the Femme Fatale Tour (2011) and Britney: Piece of Me (2013). "Toxic" has been covered by artists such as Local H, Mark Ronson, A Static Lullaby, Reece Mastin and Ingrid Michaelson, and in the TV series Glee. It has also featured in films such as Knocked Up, You Again, Pitch Perfect 3, and TV series Doctor Who and Chuck. "Toxic" has become one of Spears' signature songs and is widely named as among the most influential and innovative songs in pop music. The song has been included in multiple all-time lists of best songs, including by Pitchfork, NME and, in 2021, was ranked among Rolling Stone's 500 Greatest Songs of All Time.

== Writing and recording ==
"Toxic" was written by Cathy Dennis, Henrik Jonback, Christian Karlsson, and Pontus Winnberg from production team Bloodshy & Avant. It was produced by Karlsson and Winnberg. The song was written with American singer Janet Jackson in mind, but was initially offered to Australian singer Kylie Minogue, who turned it down. Minogue said she "listened to a snippet of it in the record-company offices and decided against it". She said she was not angry when it became successful for Britney Spears: "It's like the fish that got away. You just have to accept it."

"Toxic" was recorded at Murlyn Studios in Stockholm, Sweden, and Record Plant in Los Angeles. It was mixed by Niklas Flyckt at Khabang Studios in Stockholm. On June 5, 2017, a version of "Toxic" without the pitch-correcting software Auto-Tune on Spears's vocals was leaked to YouTube. Despite low expectations as to the quality of Spears vocal delivery, it was positively received overall, with many critics highlighting her singular voice and unique style.

== Composition ==
"Toxic"
An 18-second sample of "Toxic", containing the chorus and dance beat.

"Toxic" is a dance-pop and synth-pop song, featuring elements of South Asian music. It features varied instrumentation, such as drums, synthesizers, violins, and high-pitched strings. It also contains surf guitar, that according to Caryn Ganz of Spin, "warps and struts like it's been fed into The Matrix." The music was also compared to the soundtracks of the James Bond film series. The hook of "Toxic" samples a portion of "Tere Mere Beech Mein", from the soundtrack of the 1981 Bollywood film Ek Duuje Ke Liye. However, it is not lifted verbatim from the score and mixes two different sections of the piece for the introduction section; later in the song, the cut-up sample is dropped in favor of a re-recorded string arrangement to improve the quality of the melody as evidenced by the multitrack recordings available on the internet. Spears' vocals on the song are breathy. Some of the refrains were inspired by pieces of classical music, such as "Flight of the Bumblebee", "Eine kleine Nachtmusik", and "Dumky Trio". NME described the song as presenting "piercing strings, hip-hop beats, eastern flavour and a dangerous escapade with temptation."

According to the official sheet music on Music-Notes, "Toxic" is set in the key of G minor, and follows a fast tempo of 143 beats per minute, but the pre-chorus is based on the fourth mode of the G Harmonic Minor, the C Ukrainian Dorian mode. Spears's vocal range spans from the low note of F_{3} to the high note of G_{5}. Lyrically, "Toxic" talks about being addicted to a lover. Spears refers to her addiction in the lyrics and sings lines such as "Too high / Can't come down / Losing my head / Spinning round and round" in a falsetto. A reviewer from Popdust called the verse "The most representative lyric of the song's delirious, disorienting charm." "Toxic" ends with an outro in which Spears sings the lines, "Intoxicate me now / With your lovin' now / I think I'm ready now." Nick Southall of Stylus Magazine said the lyrics made Spears sound afraid of sex.

== Critical reception ==
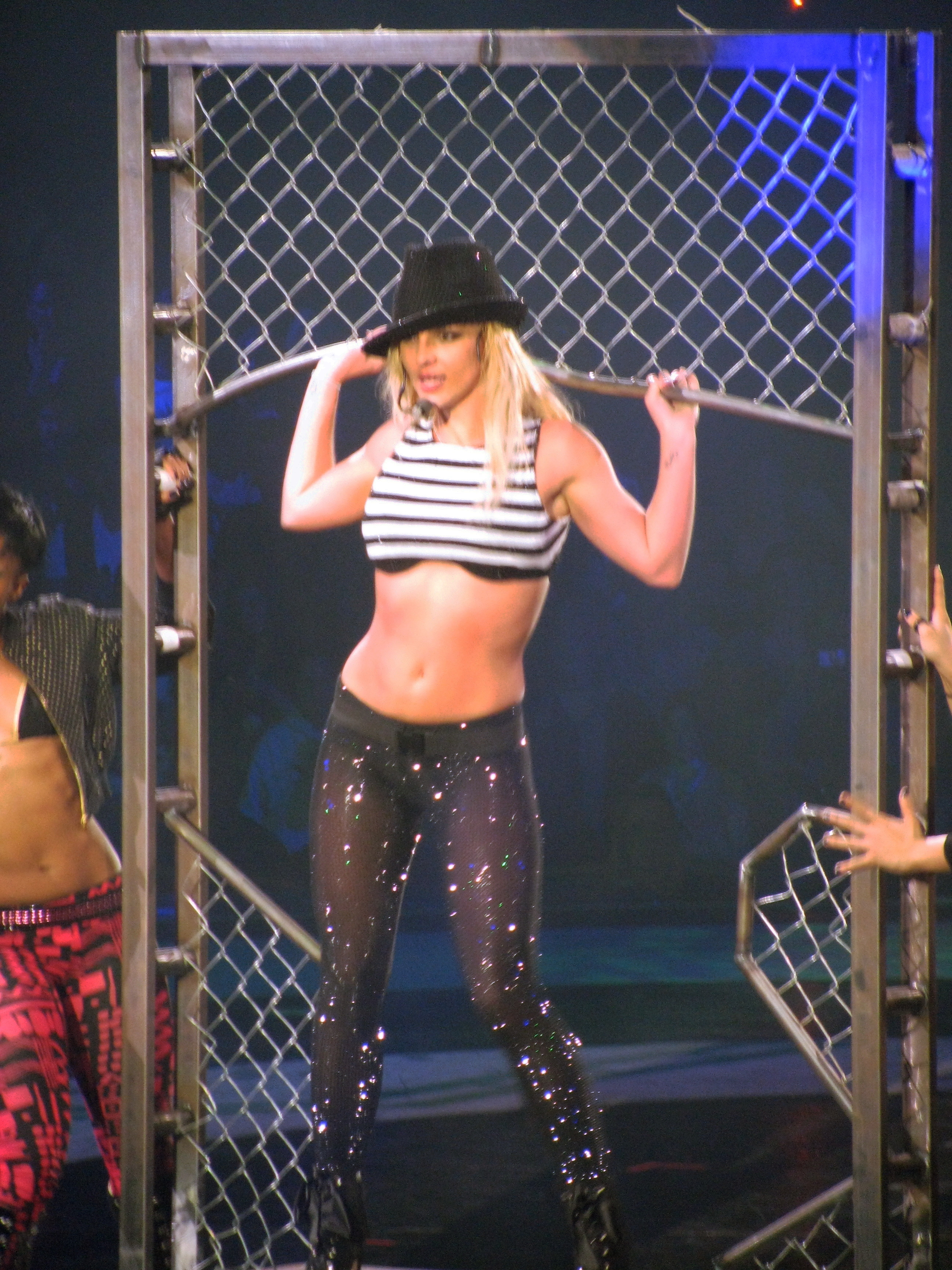
Spears performing "Toxic" on the Circus Starring Britney Spears tour

"Toxic" received acclaim. Heather Richels of The Paly Voice complimented its hook and catchiness while deeming it the most appealing song on In the Zone. While reviewing The Onyx Hotel Tour, Pamela Sitt of The Seattle Times called it the album's strongest single. Eric Olsen of Today stated the song could be the biggest hit off of its parent album while calling it "powerfully addicting." Caryn Ganz of Spin commented, "Spears hits pay dirt on 'Toxic'". Christy Lemire of Associated Press stated it was one of Spears' greatest hits and deemed it "insanely catchy", remarking that the chorus alone "makes you want to forgive the Alias wannabe video that accompanies the song." Stephen Thomas Erlewine of AllMusic called it along with "Showdown", "irresistible ear candy in what is surely Britney's most ambitious, adventurous album to date". In a separate review of Spears' greatest hits album Greatest Hits: My Prerogative (2004), Erlewine selected it as one of the "track picks" and described it as "a delirious, intoxicating rush". Jeffrey Epstein of Out compared the innovative sound of "Toxic" to Madonna's "Vogue".

Sal Cinquemani of Slant Magazine said that "Toxic" and "(I Got That) Boom Boom", "find Britney dabbling in hip-hop, but it's clear her heart lies in the clubs." Jamie Gill of Yahoo! Music Radio commented, "In the name of fairness, it will be noted that 'Toxic' and 'Showdown' could well have been good pop songs in the hands of any other singer than Spears." Joan Anderman of The Boston Globe named it "a well-titled cascade of frantic, mechanized glissandos and dreadful canned strings that buries the album's coolest (only?) chorus under a joyless mass". The song was ranked at number five in the 2004 Pazz & Jop poll by The Village Voice. "Toxic" was nominated for Best Song at the 2004 MTV Europe Music Awards, but lost to Outkast's "Hey Ya!". However, it won Best Dance Recording at the 47th Annual Grammy Awards in 2004, making it her first-ever won Grammy. It won Best Single at the 2004 Teen Choice Awards. Pitchfork named "Toxic" the third-best single of 2004, writing that "finally, [Spears] just acted like an adult, rather than constantly reminding us she wasn't a girl anymore".

== Commercial performance ==
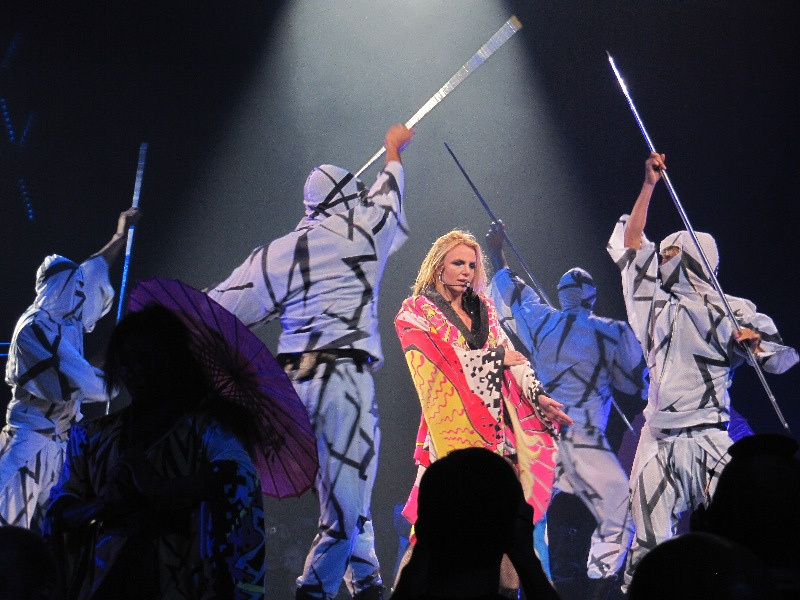
Spears performing "Toxic" at the Femme Fatale Tour

In December 2003, it was announced by MTV News that after trying to choose between "(I Got That) Boom Boom" and "Outrageous" to be the second single from In the Zone, Spears had selected "Toxic" instead. She described it as "an upbeat song. It's really different, that's why I like it so much."

"Toxic" entered at number 53 on the Billboard Hot 100 on the issue dated January 31, 2004. It became the week's "Highest Debut". On March 27, 2004, it peaked at number nine; it was her fourth single to reach the top-ten and became her first single to reach the top ten since "Oops!... I Did It Again" in 2000. "Toxic" also topped both the Pop Songs and Hot Dance Club Songs charts. As of July 2016, "Toxic" had sold 2.3 million digital downloads in the United States, according to Nielsen SoundScan. It is her fifth best-selling digital single in the country. On October 24, 2023, the song was certified 6× platinum by the Recording Industry Association of America (RIAA) for track-equivalent sales of six million units. The song also topped the Canadian Singles Chart. "Toxic" debuted at the top of the Australian charts on March 15, 2004, and stayed in the position for two weeks. The song received a gold certification by the Australian Recording Industry Association (ARIA) for shipments over 35,000 units.

In New Zealand, "Toxic" debuted at number 38 on the issue dated February 16, 2004, and peaked at number two on March 29, 2004. It stayed at the position the following week, held off from the top spot by Eamon's "Fuck It (I Don't Want You Back)". On March 7, 2004, "Toxic" debuted at number one on the UK Singles Chart for the week ending date March 13, 2004, selling 102,576 copies in its first week, becoming her fourth number-one hit in the United Kingdom, her first since "Oops!... I Did It Again" in 2000. In April 2004, it was certified silver by the British Phonographic Industry (BPI), with sales over 200,000 copies, and was the ninth best selling single in the U.K. in 2004. According to the Official Charts Company, the song has sold 426,000 copies there. "Toxic" also peaked inside the top-ten in every country it charted. The song topped the charts in Hungary and Norway; reached the top five in Austria, Czech Republic, Denmark, Germany, Portugal, Italy, France, Sweden and Switzerland; and the top ten in Belgium (Flanders and Wallonia), Finland, and the Netherlands. "Toxic" is Spears' most streamed single in the US, with over 448 million streams as of June 2020. In July 2023, the song crossed one billion streams on Spotify, making it Spears' first billion-streaming song on the service. By that, she also became a member of Spotify's "Billions Club".

== Music video ==
=== Background and release ===
"That's part of her brilliance [...] She totally understands that she's naughty and nice, that she's the girl next door gone bad who is constantly titillating you".

— Director Joseph Kahn on his work with Spears

The music video for "Toxic" was filmed on a Los Angeles soundstage in December 2003. It was directed by Joseph Kahn, who had previously worked with Spears on the music video for her 2000 single "Stronger". The editor of the video was David Blackburn, who later edited "Womanizer" and "Do Somethin'". Brad Rushing was the cinematographer. Spears first approached Kahn with a story sketch of a secret agent out for revenge against an ex-lover, for which Kahn created a treatment. Her concept was almost fully formed and detailed, including for example the scene in which she drops a drink on the passenger's lap. Spears said she wanted to join the mile high club and be a stewardess that kissed a man in the bathroom. Kahn suggested making him a fat man, so the "common man" would feel represented. Spears also told him about a scene in which she would be naked and covered in diamonds. Kahn stated he was "not sure what I was thinking about when she told me about that scene, maybe those intros to James Bond movies, but every video needs an iconic image to remember, and that's it." The choreography was a collaboration between Brian Friedman and Spears, and every scene had a completely different, strictly structured routine. After the treatment was finished, Kahn proceeded to cast his friends and acquaintances, as in most of his projects. The plane passenger on whom Spears drops a drink was played by his longtime casting director, while the fat man in the bathroom was played by the casting director's assistant. Spears's ex-boyfriend is played by Martin Henderson, who starred in Kahn's directorial debut Torque.

For the naked scenes, Spears cleared the set, leaving only Kahn, Blackburn, and Rushing with her to shoot the sequence. Spears also shot scenes in which she had to dance through a hallway of imaginary lasers in front of a green screen, something that Kahn deemed as "incredible to watch". The last few scenes of the video in which Spears murders her boyfriend concerned Kahn, who thought they would be censored. He explained, "the trick was to make it look pop at the same time" and told Henderson, "Would you like to be kissed by Britney Spears?". According to Kahn, the hint of a smile that appears on Henderson's face before Spears pours the poison into his mouth was what managed to get the shot past the censors. Although Spears was at first going to be involved in the editing process with Blackburn, she did not contact Kahn after the media scandal over her wedding to Jason Allen Alexander in Las Vegas. "Toxic" was Spears's most expensive music video to that point, at the cost of $1 million. The music video premiered exclusively on MTV's Making the Video on January 13, 2004. The following day, Spears appeared on Total Request Live to premiere it on regular rotation. The video was first released on the Britney Spears: In the Zone video album. An alternate karaoke version featuring the diamonds scene was released on the Greatest Hits: My Prerogative DVD.

=== Synopsis ===
Spears wears nothing but diamonds over her body in the music video for "Toxic".

The music video begins with an open shot of an airplane flying and preceded by three menacing dark birds, referencing the works of Hong Kong director John Woo. Spears appears with blonde hair dressed as a flight attendant, lifting the in-flight intercom as if on a phone call. After serving some of the passengers, she "accidentally" spills a drink into the lap of a seated male passenger; later beckoning a middle-aged, overweight, bespectacled male passenger to the bathroom where she seduces him. She peels off the man's mask to reveal an attractive man (Matthew Felker) underneath it and steals a black pass from his pocket as they passionately kiss. Spears then appears, completely re-dressed and with red hair, standing in a futuristic Paris, similar to the film Blade Runner (1982), and takes a ride on the back of a Ducati 999, driven by a shirtless male (Tyson Beckford). She wears a tight black catsuit and sports red hair, inspired by the character of Sydney Bristow (Jennifer Garner) from the television series Alias. As they speed past a woman, the draft from the motorcycle lifts up her dress, a homage to the iconic Marilyn Monroe scene in the film The Seven Year Itch (1955). They also pass two women, erotically frolicking in a store window.

The action narrative is repeatedly intercut with scenes of Spears, on all fours on the floor, wearing only diamonds. The look was compared to that of Kate Bush in the music video for her 1978 single, "The Man with the Child in His Eyes". Spears then enters Toxic Industries and gains access to a vault from which she steals a vial of green poison. As she leaves, she accidentally triggers a Mission: Impossible-style laser trap, which she evades with elaborate dance moves, including a back handspring. Scenes are intercut of Spears' ex-boyfriend (Henderson) making out with another woman in the shower. Spears, now dressed as a black-haired super-heroine, scales a building and enters an apartment, where her ex-boyfriend is waiting for his lover who is in the shower. She pummels him to the floor and kisses him just before pouring the poison into his mouth, killing him. Spears kisses him again and flies from the window balcony. She appears back on the plane as the flight attendant and winks at the camera. The video ends with a shot of the airplane flying off, through clouds, towards the sun, followed by five menacing screeching blackbirds, as seen at the beginning.

=== Response and impact ===
Jennifer Vineyard of MTV compared the video to Justin Timberlake's "Cry Me a River", saying that "Where her real-life ex just stalked his cheating lover in his clip, [...] Spears takes a more lethal approach." On February 10, 2004, MTV announced that due to the Super Bowl XXXVIII halftime show controversy in which Janet Jackson's breast was exposed on live television, "Toxic" along with other five music videos would be moved from daytime to late-night programming from 10 p.m. until 6 am. A spokeswoman for MTV announced that "given the particular sensitivity in the culture right now, we're erring on the side of caution for the immediate future." The video was nominated at the 2004 MuchMusic Video Awards in the category of Best International Artist Video, but lost to Beyoncé and Jay-Z's "Crazy in Love". It was also nominated for four MTV Video Music Awards at the 2004 MTV Video Music Awards in the categories of Best Female Video, Best Dance Video, Best Pop Video and Video of the Year, but lost all of them. Corey Moss of MTV said that Spears "remains the Susan Lucci of the VMAs." Visual effects supervisors Chris Watts and Bert Yukich won the category of Outstanding Visual Effects in a Music Video at the 3rd Annual Visual Effects Society Awards. In 2004, the song was the most played music video on U.K. television.

In September 2009, the music video for "Toxic" was voted by users of the music video website MUZU.TV as the sexiest music video. The video was also used on Life Is Pornography, a 2005 video art by Jubal Brown. Amy Schriefer of NPR noted that in the video, Spears was no longer trying to break away from her 1990s teen pop image and style; she was comfortable and having fun, not trying to generate any type of calculated controversy. The anime music video for Spears's single "Break the Ice" (2008) was based on the secret agent character of "Toxic". The video for "Womanizer" (2008) was created by Spears as a sequel to "Toxic". In the 2010 Glee season 2 episode "Britney/Brittany", the character of Brittany Pierce (Heather Morris) danced in a diamond suit during a cover of "I'm a Slave 4 U". In a 2011 poll by Billboard, the song's music video was voted the second-best music video of the 2000s, behind only Lady Gaga's "Bad Romance" (2009). Jillian Mapes of Billboard wrote that Spears "proved that she comes in every flavor [...] But the one role that stays constant through the dance-heavy clip: Sultry maneater." Taylor Swift and Kendrick Lamar's "Bad Blood" music video pays homage to the red-haired look Spears sports in the "Toxic" music video. Many comparisons were made about the similarities.

"Toxic" is still widely credited for changing the face of dance-pop in the 2000s. It introduced an influx of electropop into the modern market, providing the blueprint for various smash hits. As of 2025, the music video of "Toxic" has over 698 million views on YouTube.

== Live performances ==
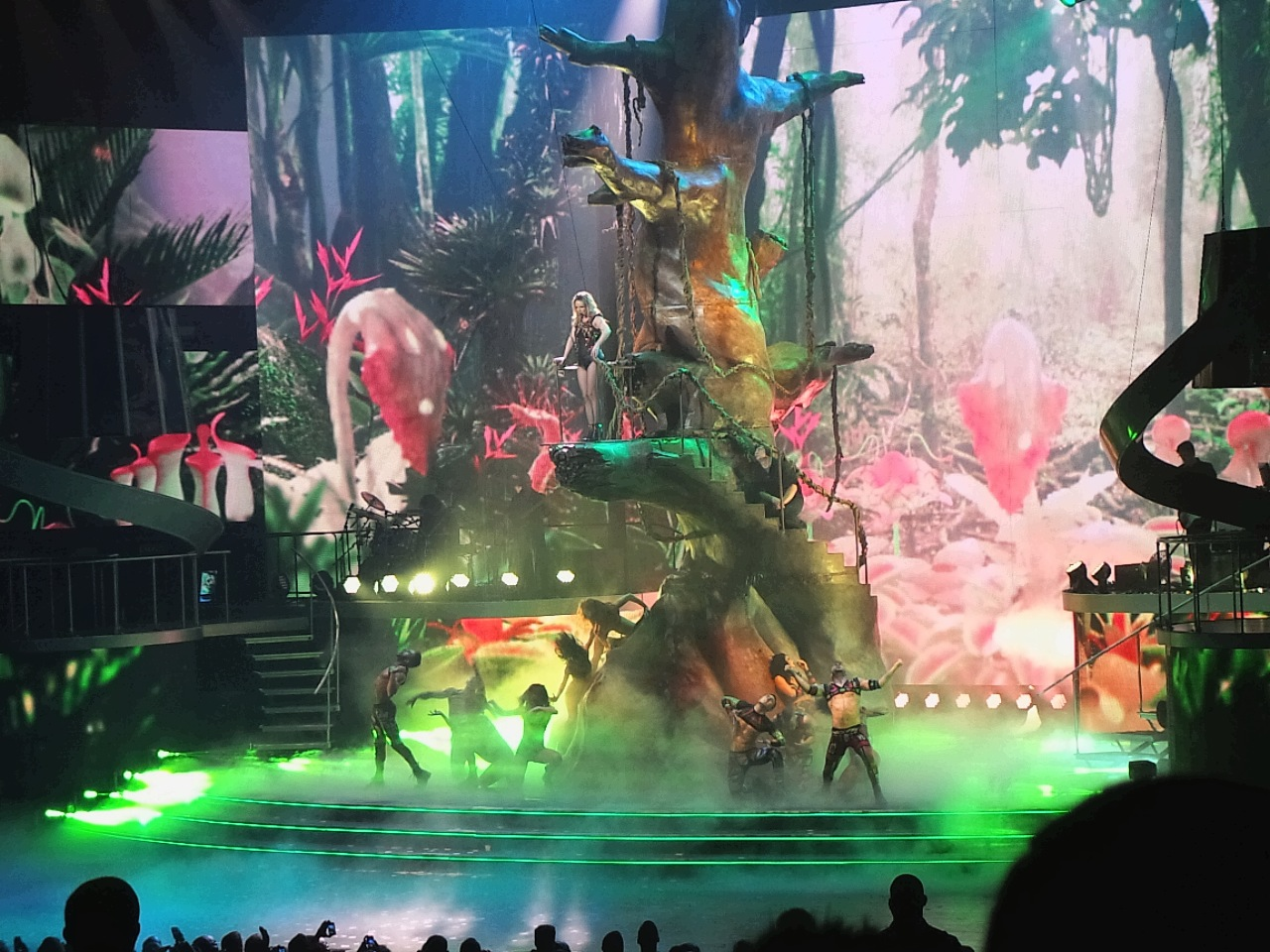
Spears performing "Toxic" at Britney: Piece of Me in 2014

"Toxic" was performed by Spears at Britney Spears: In the Zone, a concert special that aired on ABC on November 17, 2003. She also performed "Toxic" as the headliner of the KIIS-FM Jingle Ball concert on December 5, 2003, at the Staples Center. It was the opening number of her set, and Spears appeared wearing a black top and a white fur cape. While the choreography was deemed as "erotic", Corey Moss of MTV commented that some of the effect was lost due to Spears's lip-synching and a stagehand fixing a prop during the song. On January 24, 2004, Spears opened the 2004 NRJ Music Awards with a performance of "Toxic". During the ceremony, she also presented the NRJ Award of Honor for the Career to Madonna. Spears performed "Toxic" as the opening number of 2004's the Onyx Hotel Tour. Previous to the beginning of the tour, she deemed it as the song she was most excited to perform, along with "Everytime". After an introduction in which she briefly appeared on a large video screen, Spears took the stage standing on top of a hotel bus, wearing a tight black catsuit. She was surrounded by dancers dressed as employees and columns of LED lighting, suggesting the façade of a glitzy hotel on the Vegas Strip. MTV UK commented, "OK, so she doesn't so much sing than mime along with 'Toxic', [...] But what do you expect when she's simultaneously performing a vigorous dance routine, ascending moving staircases and descending fireman poles?".

"Toxic" was also performed as the last song of the concert during the M+M's Tour. After "Do Somethin'", in which Spears wore a hot pink bra, a white fur coat, and a jean skirt, she ended the set with "Toxic", with four female dancers in a Shakira-like style. Following the performance, she thanked the audience and introduced her dancers. "Toxic" was also performed at 2009's the Circus Starring Britney Spears. Following an interlude in which the dancers showcased their individual moves, the stage was lit with green sci-fi effects, and Spears appeared over moving jungle gyms. Jerry Shriver of USA Today said that "fan-favorite 'Toxic' [...] succeeded because the focus was solely on the star." Jane Stevenson of the Toronto Sun named it one of the standout performances of the show, along with "...Baby One More Time" and "Womanizer". Screen commented, "The high point of the show was the back to back performance of two of Britney's biggest hits, 'Toxic' and 'Baby One More Time' [sic], which had the crowd break out in wild applause."

The song was performed at 2011's Femme Fatale Tour. After a video intermission in which Spears finds and captures the stalker that follows her, the show continues with a martial arts-inspired remix of "Toxic", in which Spears wears a kimono and battles dancing ninjas. Keith Caufield of Billboard felt the performance was comparable to Madonna's "Sky Fits Heaven" at 2001's Drowned World Tour. Shirley Halperin of The Hollywood Reporter stated that "[the] mid-tempo numbers [...] seemed to stall out quickly, where faster offerings like 'Womanizer,' 'I Wanna Go' and 'Toxic' had the sold-out crowd jumping in place and pumping their number twos in the air." August Brown of the Los Angeles Times said, "The set's only weak spots were sonic revisions of catalog staples – the Bollywood spy-flick vamp of 'Toxic' remains utterly groundbreaking and didn't need an Ibiza-inspired revision.". Spears performed the song during the last act from her 2013–17 Las Vegas residency Britney: Piece of Me. The number begins with a ballad version of "Toxic" and Spears is seen over a giant tree. Before the chorus begins, Spears jumps from the tree in a kind of bungee jump under a water curtain. As Spears lands in the stage, the first chords from the song starts and the performance keeps going on. At the 2016 Billboard Music Awards, it was performed as the closing song of a greatest hits medley by Spears, with brand new choreography. The song was also included in Spears's setlist for the iHeartRadio Music Festival on September 24, 2016. Spears performed the song as part of her Apple Music Festival performance in London on September 27, 2016. The song was also performed along with "Work Bitch" at Britney: Piece of Me in December, and broadcast on ABC's Dick Clark's New Year's Rockin' Eve to a record audience of 25.6 million.

== Legacy ==
"The great pop song of this century. The ultimate Britney Spears classic. A taste of a poison paradise. "Toxic" is all that and more, summing up Britney at her best and brashest. Swedish studio wizards Bloodshy and Avant prove that they're the producers who understand her better than anyone. "Toxic" is a swirl of spaced-out glam-disco kicks, spy-movie strings, surf-guitar twang, a beat that should wear a warning, and Britney's distinctive slithery drawl. She doesn't just take "a sip from the devil's cup," she guzzles that bitch and crushes the cup on her forehead, slipping under the addictive spell of music itself, the one vice she'll never give up. Intoxicate her now? She's ready now."

— Rob Sheffield from Rolling Stone on the legacy of "Toxic".

"Toxic" won Spears her first, and to date only, Grammy Award at the 2005 ceremony in the Best Dance Recording category and gained her credibility amongst critics. The song also won Most Performed Work at the 2004 Ivor Novello Awards. "Toxic" was ranked at number fourteen on Stylus Magazine's Top 50 Singles between 2000 and 2005. In a 2005 poll conducted by Sony Ericsson, "Toxic" was ranked as the world's second favorite song, only behind "We Are the Champions" by Queen. Over 700,000 people in 60 countries cast their votes. The song was also included on The 500 Greatest Songs Since You Were Born list by Blender. Pitchfork listed the song on The Top 500 Tracks of the 2000s. Jess Harvell commented that Spears had great pop instincts and that "Toxic" showed how "Britney always had more individualist pep than her peers, important when you're dealing with steamroller productions from the mind of Max Martin."

In 2009, NPR included "Toxic" on their Most Important Recordings of the Decade list. Amy Schriefer noted that the song's synths defined the sound of dance-pop for the rest of the decade while adding that it "still sound[s] fresh and futuristic." "Toxic" was listed on several others end of the decade lists; at number forty-seven by NME, forty-four by Rolling Stone and seventeen on The Daily Telegraph. NME called it the soundtrack to all of the fun of the decade, from "little girls at discos" to "gay clubs and hen nights." NME critics also ranked "Toxic" at number 92 on their 500 Greatest Songs list, writing that the song "reinvented popular dance music." In 2010, the song was voted in Rolling Stone's end of the decade readers poll as the fourth-best single of the decade. In 2021, the song was ranked at number 114 on the list of Rolling Stone's 500 Greatest Songs of All Time. Pitchfork listed the song at number three on their Top 50 Singles of 2004 list. Bill Lamb of About.com listed the song at number 27 on the Top 40 Pop Songs. Evan Sawdey of PopMatters commented that "Toxic" is a rare kind of song that transcends genre boundaries, and added that Spears delivered the track that defined her legacy. In May 2010, Spears revealed via Twitter that "Toxic" is her favorite song in her catalog. In 2022, in their ranking of every Spears' song, Rolling Stone ranked "Toxic" at number one. In a 2024 article, Billboard's staff ranked "Toxic" at number one on their 100 Greatest Songs of 2004 list.

=== Awards ===
Awards and nominations for "Toxic"
Award	Year	Category	Result	Ref(s).
ASCAP Pop Music Awards	2005	Most Performed Songs	Won	
BDS Certified Awards	2004	50,000 Spins	Won	
BDS Certified Awards	2004	100,000 Spins	Won	
BDS Certified Awards	2004	200,000 Spins	Won	
Comet Awards	2004	Best International Video	Nominated	
Gaygalan Awards	2005	International Song of the Year	Won	
Grammy Awards	2005	Best Dance Recording	Won	
GV Music & Fashion Awards (Note: The GV Music & Fashion Awards, also known as Groovevolt, was an online music award established by the Groovevolt.com. The website's leading music sites with more than 7.5 million page views and more than 500,000 unique users each month.)	2004	Video of the Year	Won	
International Dance Music Awards	2004	Best Pop Dance Track	Nominated	
International Dance Music Awards	2004	Best Dance Solo Artist	Nominated	
Ivor Novello Award	2005	PRS Most Performed Work	Won	
J-Wave Awards	2004	Song of the Year	Nominated	
MTV Australia Awards	2005	Best Dance Video	Nominated	
MTV Australia Awards	2005	Sexiest Video	Nominated	
MTV Europe Music Awards	2004	Best Song	Nominated	
MTV Europe Music Awards	2004	Best Pop	Nominated	
MTV Pilipinas Music Award	2004	Favorite International Video	Nominated	
MTV Video Music Awards	2004	Best Female Video	Nominated	
MTV Video Music Awards	2004	Best Dance Video	Nominated	
MTV Video Music Awards	2004	Best Pop Video	Nominated	
MTV Video Music Awards	2004	Video of the Year	Nominated	
MuchMusic Video Awards	2004	Best International Video	Nominated	
MuchMusic Video Awards	2004	Favorite International Artist	Nominated	
Nickelodeon Kids' Choice Awards	2005	Favorite Song	Nominated	
Now! Awards	2004	Most Essential Song	Won	
Now! Awards	2004	Best Song	Won	
Now! Awards	2004	Best Video	Won	
Now! Awards	2018	Best Song of the Decade 2000s	Won	
Phonographic Performance Company of Australia	2004	100 Most Broadcast Recordings of 2004	50th place	
Premios Oye!	2004	English Record of the Year	Nominated	
Smash Hits Poll Winners Party	2004	Favourite Ringtone	Won	
Teen Choice Awards	2004	Choice Single	Won	
Vevo Certified Awards	2014	Videos with over 100 million views on Vevo	Won	
Visual Effects Society	2005	Outstanding Visual Effects in a Music Video	Won	

=== Homage ===
Ken Freedman devoted an entire three-hour radio show to cover versions of the song. It aired on WFMU on June 9, 2021.

== Usage in media ==
=== Cover versions ===
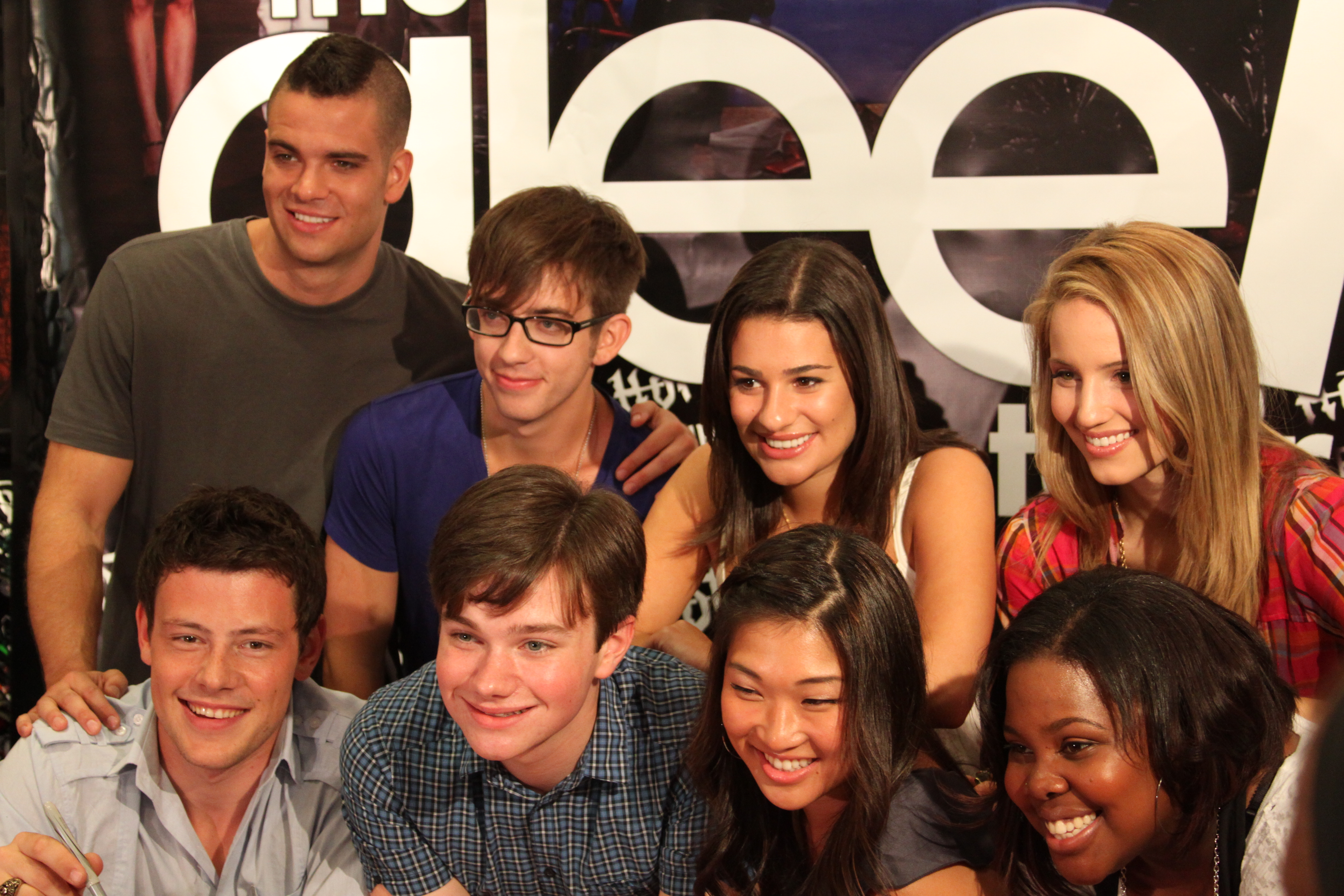
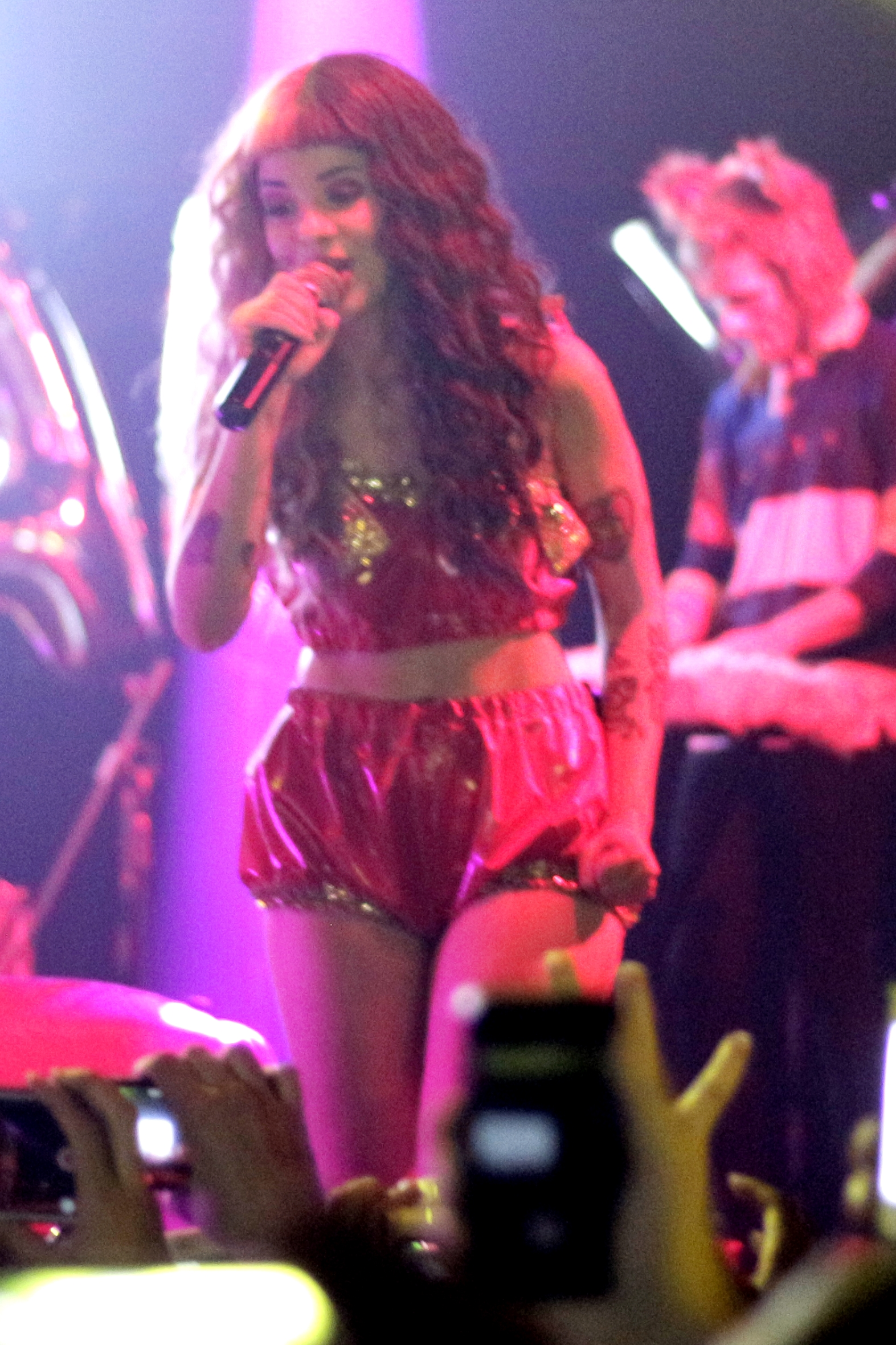
"Toxic" was covered by several artists, including the cast from Glee (top) in the "Britney/Brittany" episode, which was a tribute to Spears, and American singer Melanie Martinez (bottom) during her debut on The Voice.

The song was covered on the 2010 American series Glee episode "Britney/Brittany" by New Directions, in a Bob Fosse-inspired performance led by the character of Will Schuester (Matthew Morrison). In the United States, their version debuted at number sixteen on the Hot 100 and sold 109,000 copies on its first week, according to Nielsen SoundScan. It also charted at number thirty-seven in Australia, fifteen in Canada, and seventeen in Ireland. The song was covered again in fifth season Glee episode "100" by Dianna Agron, Heather Morris, and Naya Rivera.

Northern Irish singer-songwriter Juliet Turner covered "Toxic" for the 2004 covers compilation, Even Better Than the Real Thing Vol. 2. In 2005, American folk group Chapin Sisters recorded an acoustic cover of "Toxic", which was featured on PerezHilton.com and became one of the most requested songs of the year on KCRW. German country-rock band the BossHoss recorded a cover of "Toxic" for their debut album, Internashville Urban Hymns (2005). American rock duo Local H covered the song for their first live album, Alive '05 (2005). An instrumental rendition of the song was released by American surf rock band Monsters from Mars. Norwegian alternative rock band Hurra Torpedo covered "Toxic" in their fourth release, Kollossus of Makedonia (2006). English musician, DJ and producer Mark Ronson recorded a hip hop cover of the song, featuring American singer-songwriter Tiggers and a posthumous verse from American rapper Ol' Dirty Bastard. Ronson's version was used in series four, episode five of British television show, Waterloo Road. It was included in his second studio album and covers effort, Version (2007).

English indie rock band Hard-Fi covered the song for the compilation album Radio 1: Established 1967 (2007). The song was fused with the Clash's cover of "Brand New Cadillac". American musician Shawn Lee covered the song in the album Shawn Lee's Ping Pong Orchestra (2007). French-Israeli singer-songwriter Yael Naïm released a piano-driven version of the song in her eponymous debut album (2007). British electronic music group Metronomy's cover was described as "something out of a "Weird Al" Yankovic polka medley, only not kidding." Israeli pop singer Shiri Maimon recorded a version of "Toxic" in Hebrew. American comedy singer Richard Cheese recorded a cover for his eighth album, Viva la Vodka (2009). American post-hardcore band A Static Lullaby released a cover in the compilation album, Punk Goes Pop Volume Two (2009). A music video was released, which featured different Spears look-alikes wearing iconic outfits from various music videos, such as "...Baby One More Time" and "Womanizer".

A cover of the song by American singer-songwriter Christopher Dallman was included in an EP titled Sad Britney, released on November 9, 2009, along with covers of "...Baby One More Time", "Gimme More" and "Radar". American acoustic trio Nickel Creek covered "Toxic" at the 2006 Bonnaroo Music Festival. Australian singer-songwriter Kate Miller-Heidke did an opera-pop version of "Toxic" during a mobile phone launch in Sydney in August 2007. She dedicated it to Spears, adding, "She's going through a bit of a hard time at the moment. ... This one's for you, mate." American singer-songwriter Ingrid Michaelson covered "Toxic" regularly on her 2010 Everybody Tour. A cover version by The Hit Crew was used in the 2010 video game Just Dance 2. Michaelson's version ends with her and the band doing a dance break set to Spears' original song. American pop band Selena Gomez & the Scene performed a tribute to Spears during their 2011 We Own the Night Tour. The medley of hits included "...Baby One More Time", "(You Drive Me) Crazy", "Oops!... I Did It Again", "I'm a Slave 4 U" and "Toxic", mixed similar to the "Chris Cox Megamix" included in Greatest Hits: My Prerogative. They also performed a cover of "Hold It Against Me". During her debut on season 3 of American TV singing show The Voice in 2012, American singer Melanie Martinez sang "Toxic" playing an acoustic guitar and a tambourine with her foot. Three of the judges, Adam Levine, CeeLo Green, and Blake Shelton, hit the "I Want You" button for her. In 2014, David J covered "Toxic" featuring Sasha Grey. On December 2, 2016, Madonna covered the song during a live concert broadcast through Facebook Live.

The song was also covered in 2019 by Scottish singer Nina Nesbitt and the queercore band Dog Park Dissidents. The song is also included in the "Backstage Romance" number of the stage musical Moulin Rouge!, where it is sung in a medley with "Bad Romance", "Tainted Love", "Seven Nation Army", and "Sweet Dreams (Are Made of This)".

In 2021, the duo Altégo posted a snippet of a mashup of "Toxic" and Ginuwine's "Pony" on TikTok, that quickly went viral. In January 2022, the mashup was completed and officially released through Sony Music Entertainment under the title "Toxic Pony", being credited to Altégo, Spears and Ginuwine. The mashup reached number 40 on the Billboard Pop Airplay chart. English singer Mabel recorded an acoustic version of "Toxic" for the Apple Music edition of her second studio album, About Last Night… (2022). In 2022, Spanish singer Lola Índigo covered the song during her Teatro Eslava Madrid concert. American singer Beyoncé sampled the song at the opening night of her Renaissance World Tour (2023).

In November 2023, Irish singer Lisa Hannigan covered the song for the 5th season of the TV show Fargo.

In January 2025, K-Pop singers Yeji from ITZY, Giselle from Aespa and Julie from Kiss Of Life covered the song during a live performance at the 2024 MBC Music Festival.

In January 2026, artists KiNG MALA and Audrey Nuna released a cover of the song for Valorant's first season thematic of 2026. It appears in the cinematic Why We Fight Back.

=== Soundtrack appearances ===
In a 2005 episode of the TV show Doctor Who, Cassandra (Zoë Wanamaker) unveils an ancient jukebox that reproduced "Toxic" as an example of "a traditional ballad" from about 5 billion years prior. NME stated that the inclusion of the song marked its cultural impact. It was used again in the 2025 episode "The Well". In the 2007 film Knocked Up, the song is played when Ben Stone (Seth Rogen) and Pete (Paul Rudd) are driving to Las Vegas. Director Judd Apatow explained that he initially tried to use "Toxic" in the 2005 film The 40-Year-Old Virgin in the scene where Nicky (Leslie Mann) is drunk driving. "Toxic" was also featured in the 2010 film You Again. A string arrangement of "Toxic" was featured in the 2020 American thriller film Promising Young Woman, with film score producer Anthony Willis saying that "'Toxic' is one of the greatest pop songs of the 2000s. It's such a fantastic track and has such an evocative lyric. And so if you hear that riff and you hear that tune, you're imagining the word 'toxic,' but you're not actually hearing it." "Toxic" is featured on British soap opera Emmerdale in July 2021 when Meena Jutla (Paige Sandhu) dances to the song after she murders Leanna Cavanagh (Mimi Slinger). "Toxic" was remixed with Elvis Presley's "Viva Las Vegas" by Jamieson Shaw for Baz Luhrmann's Elvis, and was released on January 6, 2023, as "Toxic Las Vegas". "Toxic" was featured on Just Dance 2023 Edition, using the original version of the song instead of The Hit Crew's cover that was used in Just Dance 2 previously. The song was also featured on Fortnite Festival. The song played during a diner scene in 2024 superhero film Madame Web. The song was used in one of the first scenes from the first episode of the 2025 Netflix' series Apple Cider Vinegar.

== Track listings ==
- European CD single
1. "Toxic" (album version) – 3:19
2. "Toxic" (instrumental) – 3:19
- German CD single
1. "Toxic" – 3:21
2. "Me Against the Music" (LP version / video mix) – 3:44
- Australian and European CD maxi single
1. "Toxic" (album version) – 3:21
2. "Toxic" (album instrumental) – 3:19
3. "Toxic" (Bloodshy & Avant's intoxicated remix) – 5:35
4. "Toxic" (Armand Van Helden remix edit) – 6:25
- Japanese CD maxi single
1. "Toxic" (album version) – 3:21
2. "Toxic" (album instrumental) – 3:19
3. "Toxic" (Bloodshy & Avant remix) – 5:35
4. "Me Against the Music" (Gabriel & Dresden radio edit) – 3:38
- UK CD maxi single
1. "Toxic" (album version) – 3:21
2. "Toxic" (Lenny Bertoldo mix show edit) – 5:46
3. "Toxic" (Armand Van Helden remix edit) – 6:25
4. "Toxic" (Felix Da Housecat's club mix) – 7:09
5. "Toxic" (album mix instrumental) – 3:19
- DVD single
1. "Toxic" – 3:21
2. "In the Zone Special" – 4:50
3. "Toxic" (Lenny Bertoldo mix show edit) – 5:46
- UK 12-inch vinyl
1. "Toxic" – 3:21
2. "Toxic" (Felix Da Housecat's club mix) – 7:09
3. "Toxic" (Armand Van Helden remix – edit) – 6:25
4. "Toxic" (Lenny Bertoldo mix show edit) – 5:46
- US 12-inch vinyl and digital three-track remix maxi single
1. "Toxic" (Armand Van Helden remix) – 9:34
2. "Toxic" (Felix Da Housecat's club mix) – 7:09
3. "Toxic" (Lenny Bertoldo mix show edit) – 5:46

== Credits and personnel ==
Credits are adapted from the liner notes of In the Zone.

=== Recording and management ===
- Recorded at Murlyn Studios, (Stockholm, Sweden) and Record Plant Studios (Hollywood, Los Angeles, California)
- Mixed at Khabang Studio (Stockholm, Sweden)
- Mastered at Sterling Sound (New York City)
- Colgems-EMI Music Incorporated, EMI Music Publishing Ltd. and Murlyn Songs AB, administered by Universal-Polygram Int. Publishing Incorporated

=== Personnel ===
- Britney Spears – vocals
- Cathy Dennis – songwriting and background vocals
- Henrik Jonback – songwriting, guitar
- Bloodshy & Avant – songwriting, production, recording, arrangements, all instruments, programming, digital editing
- Steve Lunt – A&R, arrangements
- Janson & Janson – strings conductors, strings arrangement
- Stockholm Session Strings – "Bollywood" strings
- Thomas Lindberg – bass
- Emma Holmgren – background vocals
- BlackCell – background vocals
- Niklas Flyckt – mixing
- J. D. Andrew – engineering assistant

== Charts ==
=== Weekly charts ===
Weekly chart performance
Chart (2004)	Peak position
Australia (ARIA)	1
Austria (Ö3 Austria Top 40)	5
Belgium (Ultratop 50 Flanders)	6
Belgium (Ultratop 50 Wallonia)	6
Canada (Nielsen SoundScan)	1
Chile (Notimex)	4
CIS Airplay (TopHit)	1
Croatia International Airplay (HRT)	1
Czech Republic Airplay (ČNS IFPI)	1
Denmark (Tracklisten)	4
European Hot 100 Singles (Billboard)	1
European Radio Top 50 (Billboard)	1
Finland (Suomen virallinen lista)	8
France (SNEP)	3
Germany (GfK)	4
Greece (IFPI)	7
Hungary (Single Top 40)	1
Hungary (Rádiós Top 40)	7
Hungary (Dance Top 40)	1
Iceland (Tónlist)	8
Ireland (IRMA)	1
Italy (FIMI)	2
Japan (Oricon)	36
Mexico (Reforma)	4
Netherlands (Dutch Top 40)	4
Netherlands (Single Top 100)	6
New Zealand (Recorded Music NZ)	2
Norway (VG-lista)	1
Paraguay (Notimex)	3
Peru (Notimex)	1
Portugal (AFP)	1
Romania (Romanian Top 100)	4
Russia Airplay (TopHit)	35
Scotland (OCC)	1
Spain (Promusicae)	5
Sweden (Sverigetopplistan)	2
Switzerland (Schweizer Hitparade)	4
UK Singles (Official Charts)	1
Uruguay (Notimex)	2
US Billboard Hot 100	9
US Adult Pop Airplay (Billboard)	37
US Dance Club Songs (Billboard) Remixes	1
US Dance Singles Sales (Billboard) Remixes	3
US Hot Digital Tracks (Billboard)	1
US Pop Airplay (Billboard)	1
US Rhythmic Airplay (Billboard)	16
Venezuela (Notimex)	5

Chart (2017)	Peak position
Ukraine Airplay (TopHit)	90

Chart (2025–2026)	Peak position
Global 200 (Billboard)	185
Moldova Airplay (TopHit)	75
Poland (Polish Airplay Top 100)	100

==== Toxic Pony ====
Weekly chart performance
Chart (2022)	Peak position
Canada CHR/Top 40 (Billboard)	39
Canada Hot AC (Billboard)	45
Finland Airplay (Radiosoittolista)	83
US Hot R&B Songs (Billboard)	25
US Pop Airplay (Billboard)	40
US R&B Digital Song Sales (Billboard)	7
US R&B/Hip-Hop Digital Song Sales (Billboard)	17

==== Toxic Las Vegas (Jamieson Shaw Remix) ====
Weekly chart performance
Chart (2023)	Peak position
US Hot Dance/Electronic Songs (Billboard)	26

=== Monthly charts ===
Monthly chart performance
Chart (2004)	Peak position
CIS (TopHit)	7

=== Year-end charts ===
Year-end chart performance
Chart (2004)	Position
Australia (ARIA)	38
Austria (Ö3 Austria Top 40)	25
Belgium (Ultratop 50 Flanders)	33
Belgium (Ultratop 50 Wallonia)	27
Brazil (Crowley Broadcast Analysis)	34
Croatia International Airplay (HRT)	6
European Hot 100 Singles (Billboard)	10
France (SNEP)	38
Germany (Media Control GfK)	37
Hungary (Rádiós Top 40)	35
Ireland (IRMA)	7
Italy (FIMI)	10
Netherlands (Dutch Top 40)	51
Netherlands (Single Top 100)	16
New Zealand (RIANZ)	10
Russia Airplay (TopHit)	195
Sweden (Hitlistan)	22
Switzerland (Schweizer Hitparade)	17
Taiwan (Hito Radio)	50
UK Singles (OCC)	9
US Billboard Hot 100	48
US Dance Club Play (Billboard)	39
US Dance Radio Airplay (Billboard)	16
US Mainstream Top 40 (Billboard)	10
US Rhythmic Top 40 (Billboard)	74

Year-end chart performance
Chart (2024)	Position
Hungary (Rádiós Top 40)	67

== Certifications ==
Certifications
Region	Certification	Certified units/sales
Australia (ARIA)	Platinum	70,000^{^}
Denmark (IFPI Danmark)	2× Platinum	180,000^{‡}
France (SNEP)	Gold	200,000^{*}
Germany (BVMI)	3× Gold	450,000^{‡}
Italy (FIMI)	Platinum	70,000^{‡}
New Zealand (RMNZ)	5× Platinum	150,000^{‡}
Norway (IFPI Norway)	Platinum	10,000^{*}
Portugal (AFP)	Platinum	40,000^{‡}
Spain (Promusicae)	Platinum	60,000^{‡}
Sweden (GLF)	Gold	10,000^{^}
United Kingdom (BPI)	3× Platinum	1,800,000^{‡}
United States (RIAA)	6× Platinum	6,000,000^{‡}
Ringtone
Japan (RIAJ) Full-length ringtone	Platinum	250,000^{*}
United States (RIAA)	Gold	500,000^{*}
^{*} Sales figures based on certification alone.^{^} Shipments figures based on certification alone.^{‡} Sales+streaming figures based on certification alone.

=== "Toxic Pony" ===
Certifications
Region	Certification	Certified units/sales
New Zealand (RMNZ)	Gold	15,000^{‡}
United States Digital downloads only	—	11,000
^{‡} Sales+streaming figures based on certification alone.

== Release history ==
Release dates and formats
Region	Date	Format(s)	Version	Label	Ref.
United States	January 12, 2004	Contemporary hit radio; rhythmic contemporary radio	Original	Jive	
Japan	January 28, 2004	Maxi CD	Original	Avex Trax	
Germany	February 12, 2004	Maxi CD	Original	BMG	
Italy	February 24, 2004	Digital download (EP)	Original	BMG	
United States	February 24, 2004	Digital download (EP)	Original	Jive	
United Kingdom	March 1, 2004	12-inch vinyl; maxi CD	Original	RCA	
Australia	March 8, 2004	Maxi CD	Original	BMG	
France	March 16, 2004	CD	Original	Virgin	
Germany	March 22, 2004	Mini CD	Original	BMG	
Various	January 31, 2020	Digital download; streaming	Y2K & Alexander Lewis remix	RCA	
Various	January 21, 2022	Digital download; streaming	"Toxic Pony"	Sony	
Various	January 6, 2023	Digital download; streaming	"Toxic Las Vegas"	RCA	

== See also ==
- List of most expensive music videos
