= White Noise (Will Wood song) =

2022 single by Will Wood

Single by Will Wood

from the album "In case I make it,"
- Released: July 8, 2022
- Studio: Backroom, Rockaway, New Jersey; Kawari, Wyncote, Pennsylvania; Brown Recluse Hill, Pennsylvania
- Length: 4:37
- Label: Say-10
- Songwriter: Will Wood
- Producer: Will Wood

Will Wood singles chronology
"Euthanasia" (2022)	"White Noise" (2022)	"Ferryman (Shayfer James with Will Wood)" (2022)

Music video
- "White Noise" on YouTube

"White Noise" is a song by American musician Will Wood. It was released through the Say-10 label on July 8, 2022, as the sixth and final single for his fourth studio album "In case I make it," (2022), where it appears as the last song. The track is a ballad centered around ukulele, strings and a choir. The song's music video includes visuals of Wood pantomiming and various people celebrating nothing.

== Background ==
Will Wood described writing the song as being inspired by "feeling this really weird heavy yet hollow sort of feeling behind [his] face" in a plain-textured home near Atlantic City, New Jersey, while suffering from hallucinogen persisting perception disorder. He then began composing a melody on the ukulele preferring its sound to the nature of the piano and acoustic guitar. Wood later conducted a choir from Bulgaria via Zoom to create the backing vocals for "White Noise". (Note: A publication refers to the choir containing both 16 members. This number is not used as 30 are credited in the album's liner notes.) Later, Wood said that "the beauty of the world is in the silence beneath it".

== Composition ==
"White Noise" begins with a solo tenor ukulele composed in 4/4 time signature. Once Wood enters, he softly sings portamento. The song builds in intensity throughout and climaxes during the second verse and chorus. After this, the composition suddenly drops and slows, ending the song with a softened tone backed by ukulele.

=== Lyrics ===
Imagery of fluorescent lamps are used to mimic Wood's feeling of a "hollow, cold, vibe", while "eggshell" is used as a double entendre; both the off-white paint color seen in "rental-safe" apartments and a reference to the phrase of walking on eggshells. A sense of meaninglessness is continued throughout the first verse, with some lyrics inspired by his thoughts about elevator music. In the second verse of "White Noise", Wood humorously promotes the qualities of white noise, calling it "post-avant-garde".

== Music video ==
The music video for "White Noise" was released on July 8, 2022, with co-direction by Will Wood and Jacob Feldman. The video begins with white noise, followed by Wood walking into the middle of an open space with a ukulele. He then lip syncs without his mouth, pantomiming to follow along with the song. Footage of Wood playing instruments with their musical components removed accompanies this, later introducing various Indiegogo contributors as partygoers who gift each other empty containers and celebrate nothing. Halfway through, Wood appears with a shaved head, beginning to sing while a mute un-shaved version of himself plays backing instruments. This precedes more footage of celebrations, including a person receiving an oversized cheque worth $0 USD. The idea of Wood lip syncing without speaking was a previous idea planned for a performance video, but when he and Feldman were struggling to come up with an idea, Wood found it worked better for "White Noise".

== Personnel ==
=== Musicians ===
- Will Wood – lead vocals, piano, ukulele, production, strings arranger
- Mike Bottiglieri – guitar
- Mario Conte – drums
- Zornitsa Getova – piano
- Yoed Nir – strings
- Vater Boris – double bass
- Kevin Antreassian – mixing, mastering
- Simon Ficken – recording engineer
- Jonathon Maisto – recording engineer

=== Choir ===
Arrangement

- Will Wood – composer, arranger
- Four For Music Ltd. – arranger, recording, contracting
- Angelia Vihrova – sound engineer
- Vladislav Boyadjiev – sound engineer
- Plamen Penchev – sound engineer
- George Strezov – recording producer, team
- Georgi Elenkov PhD – conductor, team
- Boris Radilov – team
- Ognyan Georgiev – team
- Miroslava Ananieva – team
- Tsvetan Topalov – team
- Velislava Georgieva – team
- Delyan Kolev – team
- Deyan Velikov – team

Vocalists

- Gayla Simeonova
- Emiliya Kirtcheva
- Denitsa Georgieva
- Nikolina Pankova
- Maya Stoyanova
- Srebrina Mineva
- Atanaska Popova
- Flora Tarpomanova
- Eva Perchemlieva-takanova
- Nadya Pavlova
- Vesela Todorova
- Bilyana Mihaylova
- Rositsa Kazakova
- Dimana Todorova
- Maria Venkova
- Yana Vasileva
- Evgeniy Dimitrov
- Atanas Yonkov
- Orlin Kamenov
- Mihail Mihaylov
- Dimitar Zashev
- Kalin Dushkov
- Tsvetomir Hristov
- Nikolay Milev
- Emil Dakov
- Peter Petrov
- Dimitier Stoyanov
- George Beykov
- Nikola Petrov
- Dimiter Koprinkov
