= Dog Park Dissidents =

American queercore band

- Origin: New Orleans/Long Island, U.S.
- Genres: Queercore; punk rock; pop punk; anarcho-punk
- Years active: 2017–present
- Label: Say-10
- Members: Zac Xeper; Jon Greco; Joe Bove; Zeke Xander; Skylar Stravinsky
- Website: dogparkdissidents.com

Dog Park Dissidents is an American queercore anarcho-punk rock band formed in 2017. Its five members are based out of New Orleans, Louisiana; Long Island, New York; and Philadelphia, Pennsylvania.

== History ==
=== 2017-2020: Formation and early career ===
Dog Park Dissidents was founded in 2017 by vocalist Zac Xeper and guitarist Jon Greco on Long Island, New York, where they recorded the band's first song "Queer As In Fuck You" for a planned anti-Trump sampler compilation. Xeper moved to New Orleans from Long Island between recording "Queer" and its release. After the viral success of this first single, Xeper and Greco went on to produce and self-release the 2018 EP Sexual and Violent, featuring a remastered and lyrically altered version of "Queer" along three other new songs.

Xeper and Greco met one another through the furry fandom. They decided on the name Dog Park Dissidents as a "good name for a vaguely furry anarcho queer band," and as a reference to the forbidden dog park in Welcome to Night Vale.

In 2019, ahead of their second EP High Risk Homosexual Behavior, Dog Park Dissidents played and headlined their first live show in Long Island, New York, playing with a lineup that included drummer Mike Costa and bassist Joe Bove of The Arrogant Sons of Bitches. Bove would go on to record bass for High Risk Homosexual Behavior, and Costa would later enter the recording studio for the band's 2021 release ACAB For Cutie.

Dog Park Dissidents were scheduled to support Against Me! in March 2020, but this was cancelled due to the COVID-19 pandemic.

=== 2021-2023: Signing to Say-10 Records and The Pink and Black Album ===
Along with the release of ACAB For Cutie, the band announced they had signed to Say-10 Records, with a planned album-length re-release of their 3 EPs remixed by We Are the Union's Reade Wolcott and remastered by Jack Shirley.

Later in 2021, Philadelphia-based Bove officially joined the band as bassist.

Following a run of shows in 2022, touring drummer Zeke Xander and touring guitarist Skylar Stravinsky officially joined the band as permanent members, bringing the total of New Orleans–based band members to three. Xander, a member of the puppy play community inspired by the band's song "Good Boy," had previously followed Dog Park Dissidents on tour, during which they "went from groupie to stage manager in one day," before joining a second tour as drummer.

The band's origins in the furry fandom began to turn into a following on this tour, during which the band played the Furrydelphia convention.

In September, 2022, the band gained notoriety after a planned outdoor show with Pansy Division was shut down by police due to permitting issues. Xander, acting as event coordinator, alleged that the Southern Decadence show was cut short right as Dog Park Dissidents were supposed to begin playing, after the New Orleans City Constable threatened them and Xeper with arrest. In the aftermath, the band filed a lawsuit against the outdoor show's host venue.

The band's remastered record was released on vinyl and digitally in 2023 as The Pink and Black Album.

== Musical style ==
Critics have described Dog Park Dissidents as "angry queer punk rock" with glam influences. Xeper describes the band's musical style as "genrequeer", explaining they “like to keep things in the wheelhouse of punk rock but mixing in whatever else feels right… genre mixing is an inherently queer way of doing music.”

The band's lyrical themes are often political, and written from a queer anarchist perspective. They have written songs based on the Black Orchid Collective's essay "Queer Liberation is Class Struggle", and their lyrics touch on the intersection of queer liberation with anti-capitalism, loss of queer spaces due to gentrification, the climate crisis, feeling alienated from liberal identity politics, and criticism of rights-based measures of social progress.

== Band members ==
Current members

- Zac Xeper – lead vocals (2017–present)
- Jon Greco – guitar, vocals (2017–present)
- Joe Bove – bass (2021–present)
- Zeke Xander – drums (2022–present)
- Skylar Stravinsky – guitar (2022–2026)

== Discography ==
Albums

- The Pink and Black Album (2023) – Say-10 Records
- Magnificent Bastards (2024) – Say-10 Records

Extended plays

- Sexual and Violent (2018) – Self-released on Nerd Cave Recordings
- High Risk Homosexual Behavior (2019) – Self-released on Nerd Cave Recordings
- ACAB for Cutie (2021) – Self-released on Nerd Cave Recordings
- Magnificent Bastards (2024) – Say-10 Records

Singles

- "Queer as in Fuck You" (2017) – Self-released
- "Toxic" (2019) – Self-released as a single through Bandcamp; part of High Risk Homosexual Behavior on streaming platforms
- "Gift Wrap" (2022) – Say-10 Records
- "Out With a Bang" (2024) – Say-10 Records

Compilations

- Never Erased (2022) – Say-10 Records feat. "S*xual"

Music Videos

- "Host" (2020) from High Risk Homosexual Behavior
