= Self-ish =

2016 album by Will Wood and the Tapeworms

SELF-ISH

Studio album by Will Wood and the Tapeworms
- Released: August 23, 2016
- Recorded: 2015–2016
- Studios: Backroom Studios, Rockaway, New Jersey
- Genres: Dark cabaret; punk jazz; gypsy punk; glam rock
- Length: 33:28
- Labels: Say-10; Hostile City
- Producer: Kevin Antreassian

Will Wood and the Tapeworms chronology
Everything Is a Lot (2015)	SELF-ISH (2016)	The Real Will Wood (Live) (2018)

Singles from Self-ish
- 1. "Mr. Capgras Encounters a Secondhand Vanity: Tulpamancer's Prosopagnosia / Pareidolia (As Direct Result of Trauma to Fusiform Gyrus)" Released: July 8, 2016; 2. "Dr. Sunshine Is Dead" Released: July 28, 2016; 3. "2012" Released: August 9, 2016

Self-ish (stylized as SELF-iSH) is the second studio album by American indie rock band Will Wood and the Tapeworms. It was independently released on August 23, 2016, and later received distribution through Say-10 and Hostile City Distribution. Supported by three singles and four music videos, the album was written by Will Wood and produced by Kevin Antreassian. Self-ish received a positive reception for its chaotic energy and wide range of musical influence.

== Background ==
Prior to release, Will Wood described Self-ish to be "about identity, ego and lack thereof". He aimed for boldness and a lack of subtlety to strengthen his own honesty on the album. It was produced, mixed, and mastered by Kevin Antreassian of The Dillinger Escape Plan. During the creative process, Wood was unmedicated and new to therapy, which resulted in frenetic writing sessions and intense emotional experiences.

== Release ==
On July 8, 2016, "Mr. Capgras Encounters a Secondhand Vanity: Tulpamancer's Prosopagnosia / Pareidolia (As Direct Result of Trauma to Fusiform Gyrus)" was released as the lead single of Self-ish. Alongside it was a music video co-directed by Will Wood and Adam Nawrot, featuring the band performing nude in a monochromatic room. "Dr. Sunshine Is Dead" released on July 28 as the second single, followed by "2012" as the third and final single on August 9. The latter had a music video published the same day, directed by Wood with Jesse Lazarus and Maddie Schwartz. It presents the band performing in an evidence room and a party, intermittently cutting to Wood with body paint and various pieces of oversaturated or desaturated footage.

Self-ish was released as Will Wood and the Tapeworms' second album on August 23, 2016. On May 26, 2017, a music video was released for "Hand Me My Shovel, I'm Going In!". Recorded in one shot and directed by Mark Jaworski, it features the band performing in a busy and cluttered room through a fisheye lens. This was followed two years later by a music video for "Dr. Sunshine Is Dead", released on September 30, 2019. It shows the Tapeworms performing on a psychedelic background while Wood shaves his head, eats waffles in a patient gown in reference to Stranger Things, wears body paint, and digs a hole in the ground in a thunderstorm. On December 25, 2020, Self-ish was remastered and re-released by independent record label Say-10. In 2025, the original mixes of the album were distributed physically by Hostile City Distribution.

In 2026, marking the tenth anniversary of the album's release, Wood embarked on the SELF-iSH 2026 tour and sold exclusive "2026" versions of the album on CD, which includes the original 2016 mix and 6 early-mix tracks from 2015. The SELF-iSH 2026 album released digitally on September 18, 2026.

== Songs and reception ==
Self-ish contains the title tracks "Self-" and "-Ish", piano ballads that open and close the eight-song album, respectively. They discuss Wood's amnesia caused by his recreational drug use, and his thoughts on identity. The track "2012" additionally elaborates on his drug-induced amnesia, a funk-oriented track with lyrics about spirituality and psychedelics. Its composition revolves around saxophone, piano, and kazoo, while the song's lyrics are sung at a fast pace. Tony Shrum of New Noise Magazine labeled it as "sarcastically-cheery drug-addled babbling", while Bob Makin of My Central Jersey referred to it as a "jazzy acid trip". In an interview with the latter, Wood stated that the year marked Quetzalcoatl's return and a tabula rasa of existential nihilism.

"Cotard's Solution (Anatta, Dukkha, Anicca)" was described by Makin as a "zany, cirque de l’enfer revelry", likening it to Danny Elfman. "Mr. Capgras Encounters a Secondhand Vanity: Tulpamancer's Prosopagnosia / Pareidolia (As Direct Result of Trauma to Fusiform Gyrus)" is fourth on Self-ish, which uses a swing-punk melodic pattern. It was later included in "Weird Al" Yankovic's 2024 summer playlist. "The Song with Five Names a.k.a. Soapbox Tao a.k.a. Checkmate Atheists! a.k.a. Neospace Government (a.k.a. You Can Never Know)" follows as a "'50s-spirited, gospel-inspired" song, featuring Alex Nauth of Foxy Shazam.

Dianne Miranda of Gauntlet included "Hand Me My Shovel, I'm Going In!" in a playlist of songs intended to put the listener in a state of numbness, while Makin called it an "insane funeral march", overall describing the album as "a circus from hell". "Dr. Sunshine Is Dead" is a progressive rock song with latin inspiration. It focuses on dramatic instrumentation with saxophone, guitar, and piano, additionally including trumpet by Alex Nauth. Shrum related it to "Bohemian Rhapsody" and detailed it as a mix of My Chemical Romance and the Mars Volta, while Shawn Macomber of Fangoria described the track as a "gleefully deranged sonic ambience", comparing it to Gogol Bordello, Mr. Bungle, and Tom Waits.

== Track listing ==
All tracks are written by Will Wood.

No.	Title	Length
1.	"Self-" (Sometimes stylized as "Self" or "SELF-")	2:35
2.	"2012"	4:04
3.	"Cotard's Solution (Anatta, Dukkha, Anicca)"	5:05
4.	"Mr. Capgras Encounters a Secondhand Vanity: Tulpamancer's Prosopagnosia / Pareidolia (As Direct Result of Trauma to Fusiform Gyrus)"	3:43
5.	"The Song with Five Names a.k.a. Soapbox Tao a.k.a. Checkmate Atheists! a.k.a. Neospace Government (a.k.a. You Can Never Know)"	4:27
6.	"Hand Me My Shovel, I'm Going In!"	5:51
7.	"Dr. Sunshine Is Dead" (On the remaster, the track clocks in at 4:46, due to a shortened fadeout.)	5:24
8.	"-Ish" (Sometimes stylized as "-ish" or "-iSH.")	2:15
Total length:		33:28

SELF-iSH 2026 additional tracks
No.	Title	Length
9.	"2012 (2015 Demo/Pre-Mix)"	3:56
10.	"Cotard's Solution (2015 Demo/Pre-Mix)"	5:09
11.	"Mr. Capgras (2015 Demo/Pre-Mix)"	3:41
12.	"The Song with Five Names (2015 Demo/Pre-Mix)"	4:27
13.	"Hand Me My Shovel, I'm Going In! (2015 Demo/Pre-Mix)"	5:44
14.	"Dr. Sunshine is Dead (2015 Demo/Pre-Mix)"	5:16
Total length:		61:36

== Personnel ==
Credits adapted from the album's liner notes.

Musicians

- Will Wood – lead vocals, piano, kazoo
- Mike Bottiglieri – guitar, theremin, power drill
- David Higdon – tenor saxophone, soprano saxophone
- Matt Olsson – drums, percussion
- Jonathon Maisto – bass guitar
- Alex Nauth – backing vocals (5), trumpet (7)
- Mario Conte – drums (demos)

Technical

- Kevin Antreassian – production, recording engineer, mixing, mastering
- Jonathon Maisto – additional engineering
- David Higdon – demo engineer
- Gabriel Francis – demo engineer
- Will Wood – album art graphic design
- Jesse Lazarus – album art photography
- Adam Nawrot – logo design
- Polo Itona – inner sleeve photography

Additional vocalists

- Reese Van Riper – backing vocals
- Dylan Jacobus – backing vocals
- Chris McRae – backing vocals
- Cheska Colombo – backing vocals
- Lizzie Rowe – gang vocals
- Kellyanne Zeleny – gang vocals
- Timothy Simpson – gang vocals
- Mike Vablon – gang vocals
- Robby Stern – gang vocals
- Bobby Sanner – gang vocals
- Rebecca Paddon – gang vocals
- Bianca Teresi – gang vocals
