= Will Wood =

American singer

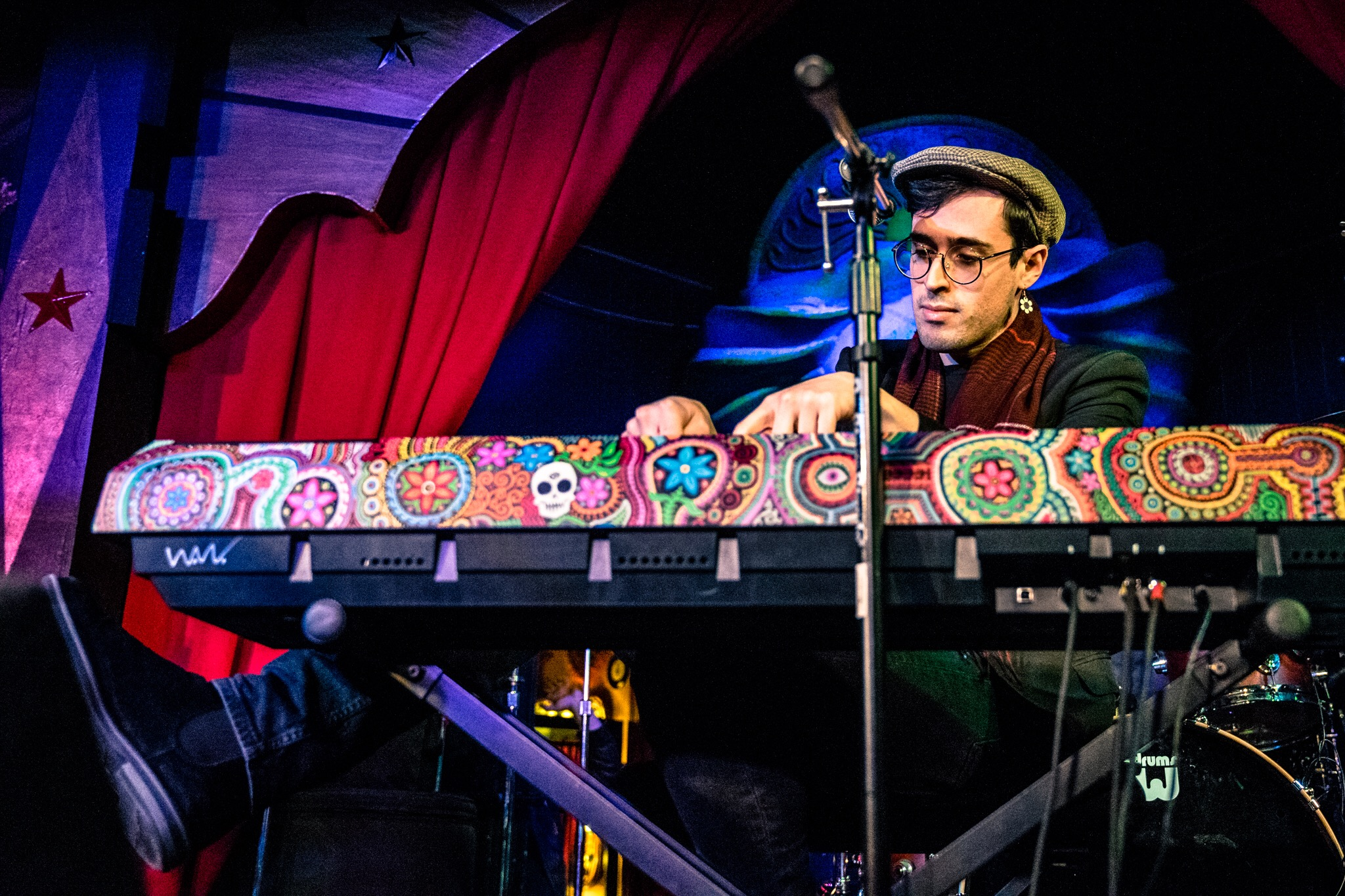
- Wood performing at Roxy and Duke's Roadhouse, Dunellen, NJ in 2018

Background information
- Occupations: Singer-songwriter; podcaster; filmmaker; artist; comedian
- Instruments: Piano; Vocals; Ukulele; Guitar; Kazoo
- Years active: 2011–2023; 2024–present
- Labels: Independent; Say-10
- Formerly of: A Verbal Equinox, Jamface, Strange Thick, The Stereosexuals
- Website: willwood.net

Will Wood is an American singer-songwriter, writer, filmmaker and comedian. He has released four studio albums. He has also released three films, the live-concert mockumentary The Real Will Wood (2020), the documentary What Did I Do? (The Making of the Normal Album) (2021), and the comedy special Slouching Towards Branson (2025).

== Style ==
Wood's piano-led style often changes from one song to the next, drawing influence from folk, pop, jazz, rock and roll, Latin music, Doo wop, and Klezmer. He is also known for his unconventional use of saxophone, ukulele, drums, piano and harmonica. When recording in the studio or performing live with his band, the Tapeworms, he has mostly been accompanied by Mike Bottiglieri on guitar, Matt Berger on alto saxophone, Mario Conte on drums, and DJ Scully on bass. The band is known for energetic live performances. Wood primarily tours solo, interweaving his songs with stand-up comedy and storytelling. His performances are known for showcasing his dark and "absurdist" humor, and for his personal and occasionally dramatic style of stand-up.

== Personal life ==
Wood describes himself as "reclusive, because I told my publicist to" and is known to avoid social media. Sources about Wood contain conflicting accounts of even basic information about his personal and professional life. The name "Will Wood" is a pseudonym, "Wood" being derived from American filmmaker Ed Wood. Will Wood is also known for having fictionalized his life early in his career, and appearing in-character in some press appearances or onstage, as well as cross-dressing and engaging in experimental live performance art. During this time, his acts would sometimes feature simulated mental breakdowns, conflict with audience plants, appearances from fictional characters, and intentionally botched performances. His image in pop culture has been heavily influenced by this, but he has expressed that his work and persona will continue to change.

Wood has consistently been open about his past struggles with drug addiction and mental illness. He entered recovery early in his career, later being diagnosed with bipolar disorder. Will donates a portion of his merchandise sales to the Brain & Behavior Research Foundation, a mental health charity, and has donated portions of ticket sales to events, saying, "I've gotten a lot better. I want to try and do something to help others get there."

== Releases ==
Throughout his teenage years, Wood played with a variety of local bands, including groups called Jamface, Strange Thick, A Verbal Equinox, and The Stereosexuals. In 2015, Wood began his solo career under the eponymous band Will Wood and the Tapeworms, and recorded and released two studio albums: Everything is a Lot in 2015 and Self-ish in 2016, along with the live album The Real Will Wood in 2018, which later served as the soundtrack to the mockumentary concert film of the same name. The last release under the Will Wood and the Tapeworms name would be in 2020, "Mr. Fregoli and the Diathesis-Stress Supermodel, Or: How I Learned to Stop Worrying and Love the Con (An Untitled Track)," a comedy skit meant to inform fans of his switch to using "Will Wood" as the artist name for future releases.

Since 2019, Will Wood has co-hosted the comedy podcast Life in the World to Come with Chris Dunne, who is also a filmmaker and long-time friend. The show is based in New Jersey.

In 2019, a crowdfunding campaign began for The Normal Album, which offered invitations to record gang vocals for the album in exchange for support, among other benefits. It raised $27,631 and was released in 2020 under his name. Following the release of The Normal Album, Wood began to attract a more significant fanbase due in part to the unintended "viral" success of the track "I/Me/Myself," which resulted in significant challenges to Wood. He later remarked, "There was an entire tour where kids who found me because of a viral clip came expecting a pop-rock act and were yelling stuff at me and each other the entire set, which obviously made doing what I do impossible."

In 2021, Will Wood worked on the soundtrack for the fictional horror/comedy podcast Camp Here And There. A "Campfire Songs Edition" of the soundtrack, with lyrical versions of three of the initially instrumental tracks, was released in 2022.

His 2022 release "In case I make it," was crowdfunded on Indiegogo in October 2021. Wood has described the collection of songs as being his most personal yet, saying: "I've always tried to consistently re-invent myself as an artist, I think. But this time is different, because for lack of a less dramatic phrase... I've reinvented myself as a person. I couldn't be more different than I was even a year or two ago."

Six singles from "In case I make it," were released prior to the album's full release. In September 2021, prior to the crowdfunding of the album, Wood released the single entitled "Sex, Drugs, Rock 'n' Roll", which would later appear on the album. On June 10, Wood released the single "You Liked This (Okay, Computer!)", a black comedy track about social media platforms with spoken word by Bev Standing. Other singles included "Tomcat Disposables", "Cicada Days", "Euthanasia", and "White Noise", all of which were accompanied by music videos co-created by Wood. On July 29, the full album was released to positive reviews.

On August 19, 2022, Wood was featured on singer-songwriter Shayfer James' single "Ferryman", which would later appear on the latter's third studio album Shipwreck (2023). On September 1, Human Zoo released "Wealth & Hellness" featuring Wood, a single for the former's second studio album of the same name (2022).

On January 13, 2023, Wood released the album IN CASE I DIE:, a live compilation of songs recorded at US tour dates in 2022. According to a guest blog post on V13, after the release, he would begin an "indefinite break or possibly retire from [his] music career."

On August 9, 2024, Wood released a new mix of The Normal Album (2020) with producer Kevin Antreassian, additionally featuring three demos. These consisted of recordings made in 2018 of "I/Me/Myself", "Laplace's Angel", and "Memento Mori", which were released in the previous month as singles. It was released to positive reviews, with some stating it noticeably improved on the original.

On August 15, 2025, Wood released a concert film and comedy special, titled Slouching Towards Branson, which was filmed on the 2024 Slouching Towards Bethlehem tour, Wood's first tour since his hiatus. It consists of 10 songs, as well as roughly an hour of stand-up comedy. The stand-up follows a semi-fictionalized story from Wood's personal life about attending a timeshare presentation in Branson, Missouri after a psychedelic mushroom trip, and explores themes of morality, faith, identity, and his experience with viral fame while referring to W.B. Yeats' poem The Second Coming and its inclusion in Joan Didion's Slouching Towards Bethlehem. The film was published to his Patreon page. The special was released to positive reviews, with Desert Sounds Mag saying "his logic takes genuinely unexpected turns that'll have you questioning your own moral compass while doubled over laughing. The man's got a gift for finding comedy in existential dread." and V13 calling the film "maximally creative and innovative" with one critic attending a live performance of the show describing it as "one of the most impressive, thought provoking, and beautiful shows I've been to in a long time." The film has won a number of independent film awards. An audio version of the special was released on streaming services on December 24 of the same year.

On October 4, 2025, Wood released a soundtrack for the point-and-click puzzle game Éalú, which was created using entirely stop-motion animation by the director of the music video for "Tomcat Disposables".

A re-release of Will Wood and the Tapeworms' Self-ish entitled "SELF-iSH 2026" which included early mixes and demos of the songs on the 2016 album was released on September 18, 2026.

== Discography ==
Studio albums

- Everything Is a Lot (2015) (Note: Released as Will Wood and the Tapeworms.)
- Self-ish (2016)
- The Normal Album (2020)
- "In case I make it," (2022)

Remix albums

- The New Normal! (The Normal Album 2024 Edit) (2024)
- "Self-ish 2026" (2026)

Live albums

- The Real (2018) (Note: Re-released in 2020 as The Real Will Wood (Music from the Award-Winning Concert Film).)
- IN CASE I DIE: (2023)

Comedy albums

- Slouching Towards Branson (2025)

Soundtrack albums

- Camp Here & There (Original Series Soundtrack) (2021) (Note: Re-released in 2022 as Camp Here & There Soundtrack: Campfire Songs Edition.) (Note: Re-released in 2025 as Camp Here & There (Extended OST) featuring unreleased tracks that were not included in earlier versions of the album.)
- éalú (Original Game Soundtrack) (2025)

=== Singles ===
List of singles as lead artist, showing year released and album name
Title	Year	Album
"Chemical Overreaction / Compound Fracture"	2015	Everything Is a Lot
"Mr. Capgras Encounters a Secondhand Vanity: Tulpamancer's Prosopagnosia / Pareidolia (As Direct Result of Trauma to Fusiform Gyrus)"	2016	Self-ish
"Dr. Sunshine Is Dead"	2016	Self-ish
"2012"	2016	Self-ish
"Alma Mater"	2020	Non-album single
"Love, Me Normally"	2020	The Normal Album
"Laplace's Angel (Hurt People? Hurt People!)"	2020	The Normal Album
"...Well, Better Than the Alternative"	2020	The Normal Album
"Mr. Fregoli and the Diathesis-Stress Supermodel, Or: How I Learned to Stop Worrying and Love the Con (An Untitled Track)"	2020	Non-album single
"Sex, Drugs, Rock 'n' Roll"	2021	"In case I make it,"
"Your Body, My Temple"	2022	Camp Here & There
"Tomcat Disposables"	2022	"In case I make it,"
"Cicada Days"	2022	"In case I make it,"
"You Liked This (Okay, Computer!)"	2022	"In case I make it,"
"Euthanasia"	2022	"In case I make it,"
"White Noise"	2022	"In case I make it,"
"I / Me / Myself (2018 Live in Studio Demo)"	2024	The New Normal! (The Normal Album 2024 Edit)
"Laplace's Angel (2018 Live in Studio Demo)"	2024	The New Normal! (The Normal Album 2024 Edit)
"The Black Box Warrior vs. The Pants (The Bitter End NYC)"	2025	Slouching Towards Branson

Collaborations

- with Jamface
  - The Krakken (2011)
  - Fruit of the Rapture (2012)
  - Turn it Off (2013)
- with Strange Thick
  - Live at Bar East (2012)
- with The Stereosexuals (2014)
  - "Bigger Than Yours"
- with A Verbal Equinox
  - "And the Ringmaster Is Pleased to Introduce..." (2013)
- with Big Ears Glenn
  - "Hey" (2017) (from: January)
- with Human Zoo
  - "Aphrodite, Your Electric Sexiness" (2019) (from: A Mindless Meditation)
  - "Wealth & Hellness" (2022) (from: Wealth & Hellness)
  - "Aphrodite, Your Electric Sexiness (Upgrade)" (2024) (from: A Mindless Meditation (Upgrade))
- with Shayfer James
  - "Ferryman" (2022)

Covers

- "Armchairs (Andrew Bird)" (2019) (from: This is for charity (sic))
- "Prince Ali" (2019) (Under the name "Will Wood and the Land Pirates") (from: D*sn*y is Birth Control)
- "Chocolate Jesus" (2019) (from: Ben Meets A Few Good Records)
- "The Velocity of Love" (2022, also released as "Will Wood – The Velocity of Love") (from: Endless Possibility: A Tribute to Jack Terricloth)
