= Mad Conductor =

American hip-hop group

Mad Conductor is an experimental hip-hop band fronted by MC Devlin (Chris Tray) and with production by MC Kinney (Dan McKinney). Their sound mixes hip-hop with a wide array of styles, in a unique and often experimental way.

The project started in 2005 when Devlin proposed the idea to McKinney. Prior to this, Devlin was the singer-songwriter in the crack rock steady band No Cash; their 2003 album Run Your Pockets was recorded at Dan's House Studio. Mad Conductor released the "Mechanical Claw" EP in 2006 and the Renegade Space Rock album in 2007. Originally from Center Valley, Pennsylvania, Devlin relocated to New Orleans in 2008. Production slowed down between 2008 and 2011, with seven songs total released.

In 2012 the band successfully raised funds on Kickstarter to record a full-length album titled MC Rises. It was released in 2013. As of 2014, Devlin was touring with a five-person band of musicians from New Orleans.

Mad Conductor reformed in Pennsylvania, from 2016-'18, releasing an EP's worth of singles, performing their final show in August 2018 in Brooklyn.

== Discography ==
- Mechanical Claw EP (2005)
- Renegade Space Rock (2007)
- Members Only EP (2008)
- Central America EP (2010)
- MC Rises (2013)
- Space Rock Steady EP (2015)
