= Lawsuits involving TikTok =

TikTok has been involved in a number of lawsuits since its founding, with a number of them relating to TikTok's data collection techniques.

== Tencent lawsuits ==
Tencent's WeChat platform has been accused of blocking Douyin's videos. In April 2018, Douyin sued Tencent and accused it of spreading false and damaging information on its WeChat platform, demanding CN¥1 million in compensation and an apology. In June 2018, Tencent filed a lawsuit against Toutiao and Douyin in a Beijing court, alleging they had repeatedly defamed Tencent with negative news and damaged its reputation, seeking a nominal sum of CN¥1 in compensation and a public apology. In response, Toutiao filed a complaint the following day against Tencent for allegedly unfair competition and asking for CN¥90 million in economic losses.

== Data transfer class action lawsuit ==
In November 2019, a class action lawsuit was filed in California that alleged that TikTok transferred personally identifiable information of U.S. persons to servers located in China owned by Tencent and Alibaba. The lawsuit also accused ByteDance, TikTok's parent company, of taking user content without their permission. The plaintiff of the lawsuit, college student Misty Hong, downloaded the app but said she never created an account. She realized a few months later that TikTok had created an account for her using her information (such as biometrics) and made a summary of her information. The lawsuit also alleged that information was sent to Chinese tech giant Baidu. In July 2020, twenty lawsuits against TikTok were merged into a single class action lawsuit in the United States District Court for the Northern District of Illinois. In February 2021, TikTok agreed to pay $92 million to settle the class action lawsuit. The court approved the settlement in July 2022.

== Inappropriate content for minors ==
In December 2022, Indiana Attorney General Todd Rokita filed two separate lawsuits against TikTok in the Allen County Superior Court in Fort Wayne, Indiana. The first complaint alleged that the platform exposed inappropriate content to minors, and that TikTok "intentionally falsely reports the frequency of sexual content, nudity, and mature/suggestive themes" on their platform which made the app's "12-plus" age ratings on the Apple and Google app stores deceptive. The second complaint alleged TikTok does not disclose the Chinese government's potential to access sensitive consumer information. The two lawsuits were later consolidated and dismissed. In dismissing the lawsuit in November 2023, the Superior Court cited that the court “lacks personal jurisdiction” over TikTok.

In March 2024, the Italian Competition Authority fined TikTok €10 million ($11 million) for failing to prevent the spread of harmful content, including the "French scar" challenge, where users pinched their cheeks to create lasting bruises, endangering minors' safety.

In June 2024, Utah Attorney General sued TikTok in state court, accusing its livestreaming feature of enabling the sexual exploitation of children. The lawsuit alleges that TikTok Live operates like a "virtual strip club," where adults may encourage minors to perform illicit acts in exchange for monetary gifts. While TikTok does not allow users under the age of 18 to host livestreams, the lawsuit criticizes TikTok's inadequate age verification and enforcement measures, claiming they fail to ensure user safety. In January 2025, Utah further alleged TikTok knowingly allows the exploitation, prioritizing profits over user safety.

In November 2024, a group of French families sued TikTok over exposing adolescents to harmful content, leading two to take their lives. The families alleged TikTok's algorithm exposed the children to content promoting self-harm, eating disorders and suicide. A French court opened a criminal investigation in November 2025 into TikTok and the risks that its algorithms could push young people to suicide.

In November 2024, Venezuelan families and organizations filed an appeal for protection with Venezuela's Supreme Court concerning the impact of unregulated content on TikTok. Following a hearing, the court fined TikTok $10 million on December 30, 2024, over viral video challenges that authorities say led to the deaths of three children. The court cited TikTok's negligence in failing to implement "necessary and adequate measures" to prevent the viral challenge.

== Voice actor lawsuit ==
In May 2021, Canadian voice actor Bev Standing filed a lawsuit against TikTok over the use of her voice in the text-to-speech feature without her permission. The lawsuit was filed in the Southern District of New York. TikTok declined to comment. Standing had taken up a contract with the Chinese government-run Institute of Acoustics narrating English for translations but says she never agreed for her voice to be used in other ways. The voice used in the feature was subsequently changed.

== Collecting children's data ==
In June 2021, the Netherlands-based Market Information Research Foundation (SOMI) filed a €1.4 billion lawsuit with an Amsterdam court on behalf of Dutch parents against TikTok, alleging that the app gathers data on children without adequate permission. In interlocutory judgments issued in October 2023 and January 2024, the Amsterdam District Court allowed the claims of SOMI to proceed, along with those of the Foundation Take Back Your Privacy and the Foundation Mass Damage & Consumer.

On August 2, 2024, the US Department of Justice sued TikTok for allegedly violating the Children's Online Privacy Protection Act (COPPA). In October 2024, Texas sued TikTok, accusing it of violating state law by sharing children's personal identifying information without consent from their parents or legal guardians. In October 2024, Attorneys General of thirteen states and the District of Columbia filed lawsuits against TikTok over collecting children's data in violation of the federal COPPA, as well as over mental health concerns involving minors. In one of the lawsuits, the Attorney General of Kentucky also alleged that TikTok developed an internal strategy to use its content to influence U.S. Senator Mitch McConnell and other politicians.

TikTok has agreed to pay $400 million to settle a lawsuit filed by the U.S. Department of Justice. The department had accused the company of violating the federal law on children's privacy by collecting personal data from users under the age of 13 without parental consent.

== Blackout Challenge ==
Multiple lawsuits have been filed against TikTok, accusing the platform of hosting content that led to the death of at least seven children. The lawsuits claim that children died after attempting the "Blackout challenge", a TikTok trend that involves strangling or asphyxiating someone or themselves until they black out (passing out). TikTok stated that search queries for the challenge do not show any results, linking instead to protective resources, while the parents of two of the deceased argued that the content showed up on their children's TikTok feeds, without them searching for it.

In May 2022, Tawainna Anderson, the mother of a 10-year-old girl from Pennsylvania, filed a lawsuit against TikTok in the United States District Court for the Eastern District of Pennsylvania. Her daughter died while attempting the Blackout Challenge on TikTok. The District Court dismissed the complaint in October 2022 and held that the Communications Decency Act, 47 U.S.C. § 230, immunizes TikTok. On appeal, the United States Court of Appeals for the Third Circuit reversed and remanded the case to the lower court in August 2024, holding that Section 230 only immunizes information provided by third parties and not recommendations made by TikTok's algorithm.

In February 2025, the parents of four British teenagers sued TikTok in the Delaware Superior Court, alleging that their children died while attempting the "Blackout challenge."

According to The Independent, the Blackout Challenge reportedly was linked to the deaths of 20 children between 2021 and 2022, 15 of whom were under the age of 12.

== Discrimination ==
In February 2024, Katie Puris, a former senior executive at TikTok filed a lawsuit in the United States District Court for the Southern District of New York against the company, alleging discrimination based on age and gender. Prior to this lawsuit, she had filed a complaint with the Equal Employment Opportunity Commission (EEOC) against the company in May 2023, alleging discrimination and retaliation.

In August 2024, Olivia Anton Altamirano, a TikTok UK content moderator, sued the social media platform and its parent company, ByteDance Ltd., in the London employment tribunal, alleging disability discrimination and a toxic workplace culture that caused her stress and pregnancy complications. TikTok denied the allegations. After a hearing, a UK judge allowed the case to proceed.

== Mental health of minors ==
In May 2024, the Nebraska Attorney General filed a lawsuit against TikTok for allegedly harming minors' mental health through an algorithm designed to cultivate compulsive behavior.

In June 2024, the New Hampshire Attorney General filed a lawsuit against TikTok, alleging "false assurances of safety, while profiting from the vulnerabilities of its youngest users" in violation of the state's consumer protection laws. In July 2025, New Hampshire Superior Court Judge John Kissinger Jr. denied TikTok's motion to dismiss and stated that New Hampshire's allegations were valid and specific enough to proceed.

In the October 2024 lawsuits filed by Attorneys General of thirteen states and the District of Columbia, the states also claimed that the TikTok app is intentionally designed to be addictive for children and harms their mental health.

In January 2025, a group of French families sued TikTok France for allegedly failing to protect children from content promoting suicide methods. In February 2025, a group of British families sued TikTok in the U.S. for the alleged wrongful deaths of their children.

In September 2026, TikTok settled Alabama's lawsuit, and agreed to pay Alabama at least $100 million and implement additional platform safeguards for teenage users such as daily usage limits as well as more robust parental control and stronger age verification.

== See also ==
- Lawsuits involving Google
- Lawsuits involving Meta Platforms

== Sources ==
- Benson, Peter J.; Brannon, Valerie C.; Lampe, Joanna R. (May 9, 2024). Regulation of TikTok Under the Protecting Americans from Foreign Adversary Controlled Applications Act: Analysis of Selected Legal Issues (Report). Congressional Research Service.
- Sutherland, Michael D.; Benson, Peter J.; Cho, Clare Y. (May 14, 2024). TikTok: Frequently Asked Questions and Issues for Congress (Report). Congressional Research Service.
- Benson, Peter J.; Brannon, Valerie C.; Lampe, Joanna R. (December 19, 2024). TikTok v. Garland: Constitutional Challenges to the Protecting Americans from Foreign Adversary Controlled Applications Act (Report). Congressional Research Service.
