= "In case I make it," =

Studio album by Will Wood
- Released: July 29, 2022
- Genres: Baroque pop; folk pop; indie folk; progressive pop
- Length: 72:17
- Label: Say-10

Will Wood chronology
Camp Here & There: Original Series Soundtrack (2021)	"In case I make it," (2022)	IN CASE I DIE: (2023)

Singles from "In case I make it,"
- 1. "Sex, Drugs, Rock 'n' Roll" Released: September 20, 2021; 2. "Tomcat Disposables" Released: April 29, 2022; 3. "Cicada Days" Released: May 25, 2022; 4. "You Liked This (Okay, Computer!)" Released: June 10, 2022; 5. "Euthanasia" Released: June 17, 2022; 6. "White Noise" Released: July 8, 2022

"In case I make it," (Note: The title includes the quotation marks on most releases.) is the fourth studio album by American musician Will Wood, released through Say-10 on July 29, 2022. It is considered by some to be a significant stylistic departure from his previous releases, with a focus on orchestral arrangements and acoustic instrumentation.

== Writing and production ==
Writing for Will Wood's fourth album took place between 2018 and 2022. In early 2021, he announced that the album would be funded through Indiegogo and called In Case I Die. This name was replaced later in the year by "In case I make it," as the former title was conceived through fear of death and intended to be his final album. Wood later referred to the album as "essentially a musical suicide note". Wood created demos of the album solely with MIDI, only introducing the songs to his band after completion and sharing them with orchestras and brass personnel.

== Release ==
Prior to the album's release, Wood released the singles "Sex, Drugs, Rock 'n' Roll", "Tomcat Disposables", "Cicada Days", "You Liked This (Okay, Computer!)", "Euthanasia", and "White Noise". Wood stated after the release of "In case I make it," that he would be taking an indefinite hiatus from creating music after finishing his tour, leaving some to speculate whether he would be quitting music permanently, although this was not the case as he returned to the stage for his Slouching Towards Bethlehem tour in 2024.

== Reception ==
Joshua Nelson of Bleeding Cool described the album as "a more subdued and mellow take on the stories and issues Will Wood typically tackles in his songwriting." Caitlin Hsu of SwitchBitch Noise called Wood "the master of writing the most danceable songs with the most devastating lyrics" for his work on the album. Behind the Curtains Media's Suzanne Torrison called the album "his most intricate and musically diverse album to date... in Will Wood's ever-changing and genre-bending discography."

== Track listing ==
No.	Title	Length
1.	"Tomcat Disposables"	5:58
2.	"Becoming the Lastnames"	7:42
3.	"Cicada Days"	4:10
4.	"Euthanasia"	4:37
5.	"Falling Up"	4:47
6.	"That's Enough, Let's Get You Home."	3:52
7.	"Um, It's Kind of a Lot"	5:22
8.	"Half-Decade Hangover"	4:50
9.	"Vampire Reference in a Minor Key"	4:38
10.	"You Liked This (Okay, Computer!)"	2:12
11.	"The Main Character"	4:25
12.	"Against the Kitchen Floor"	5:06
13.	"Sex, Drugs, Rock 'n' Roll"	5:04
14.	"Big Fat Bitchie's Blueberry Pie, Christmas Tree, and Recreational Jell-o Emporium a.k.a. "Mr. Boy is on the Roof Again" (Feat. Pasta by Sneakers McSqueakers) [From the Motion Picture "B.F.B.'s B-Sides: Bagel Batches, Marshmallows, and Barsh-mallows]"	0:48
15.	"Willard!"	4:19
16.	"White Noise"	4:38
Total length:		72:17

== Personnel ==
=== Musicians ===
- Will Wood – lead vocals, piano, tenor & baritone ukulele, production, strings arranger
- Mike Bottiglieri – guitar
- Mario Conte – drums
- Matt Berger – saxophones, clarinet
- Yoed Nir – strings
- Vater Boris – double bass
- Kevin Antreassian – mixing, mastering
- Simon Ficken – recording engineer
- Jonathon Maisto – recording engineer

=== Choir ===
Arrangement

- Will Wood – composer, arranger
- Four For Music Ltd. – arranger, recording, contracting
- Angelia Vihrova – sound engineer
- Vladislav Boyadjiev – sound engineer
- Plamen Penchev – sound engineer
- George Strezov – recording producer, team
- Georgi Elenkov PhD – conductor, team
- Boris Radilov – team
- Ognyan Georgiev – team
- Miroslava Ananieva – team
- Tsvetan Topalov – team
- Velislava Georgieva – team
- Delyan Kolev – team
- Deyan Velikov – team

Choir vocalists

- Gayla Simeonova
- Emiliya Kirtcheva
- Denitsa Georgieva
- Nikolina Pankova
- Maya Stoyanova
- Srebrina Mineva
- Atanaska Popova
- Flora Tarpomanova
- Eva Perchemlieva-takanova
- Nadya Pavlova
- Vesela Todorova
- Bilyana Mihaylova
- Rositsa Kazakova
- Dimana Todorova
- Maria Venkova
- Yana Vasileva
- Evgeniy Dimitrov
- Atanas Yonkov
- Orlin Kamenov
- Mihail Mihaylov
- Dimitar Zashev
- Kalin Dushkov
- Tsvetomir Hristov
- Nikolay Milev
- Emil Dakov
- Peter Petrov
- Dimitier Stoyanov
- George Beykov
- Nikola Petrov
- Dimiter Koprinkov
