= Say-10 =

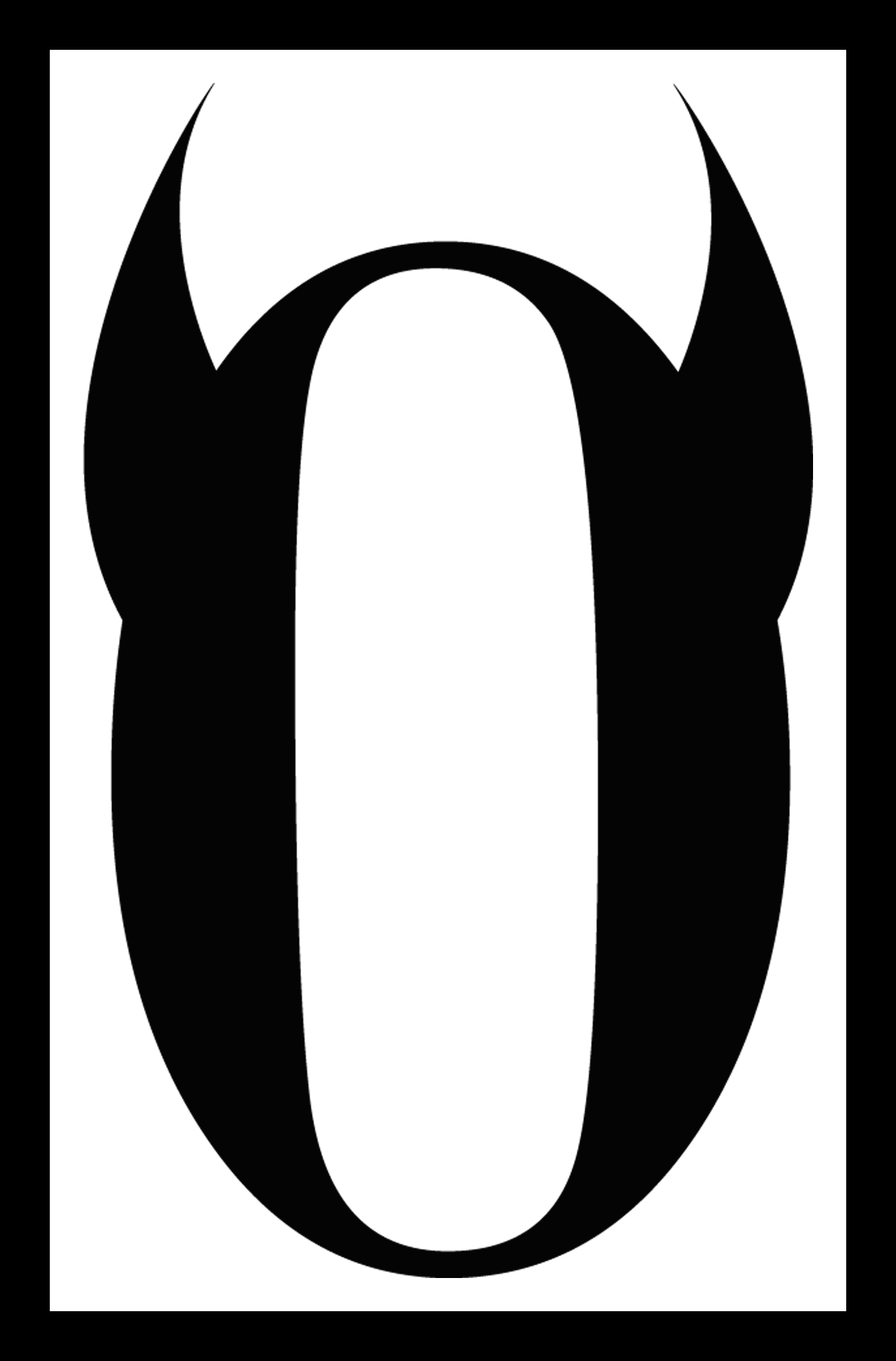
- Founded: 2007
- Founder: Adam Gecking
- Genre: Punk rock, hardcore punk
- Country of origin: U.S.
- Location: Richmond, Virginia
- Official website: www.say-10.com

Say-10 is an independent record label and skateboard company owned by Adam Gecking and operated from his house in Richmond, Virginia. Say-10 was founded in 2007 in Virginia Beach, Virginia, while he owned Volume, an independent record store.

== Artists with releases on Say-10 ==
- Alkaline Trio
- Among Giants
- Aspiga
- Banner Pilot
- Beach Slang
- Broadway Calls
- Brook Pridemore
- Brutal Youth
- Challenges
- Civil War Rust
- Cobra Skulls
- Counterpunch
- Daycare Swindlers
- Direct Hit!
- Dirty Tactics
- Divided Heaven
- Dog Park Dissidents
- Entropy
- Everybody's Worried About Owen
- GDP
- Great Apes
- Gutter Gloss
- Green Jellÿ
- Fucked Up
- Iron Chic
- Jared Hart
- Karbomb
- Know Your Saints
- Lagwagon
- The Lawrence Arms
- Less Than Jake
- Let It Go
- The Lillingtons
- Mad Conductor
- Madison Turner
- Matt Pless
- Middle-Aged Queers
- Mega Infinity
- Murder by Death
- Oh My Snare!
- Oklahoma Car Crash
- Payoff
- Pedals On Our Pirate Ships
- Pissing Contest
- The Priceduifkes
- Red City Radio
- Retox
- The Riot Before
- The Scandals
- Seagulls
- Shayfer James
- The Shell Corporation
- Slutever
- Smoke or Fire
- Stabbed in Back
- Static Scene
- Supreme Commander
- Teenage Bottlerocket
- Teen Agers
- Three One G
- Überyou
- Utter Failure
- The Vandals
- Walk the Plank
- Who's Driving? Bear's Driving!
- Will Wood
