= Therefore I Am (disambiguation) =

Cogito, ergo sum ("I think, therefore I am") is a philosophical statement by French philosopher René Descartes.

Therefore I Am may also refer to:

- Therefore I Am (band), a former post-hardcore band from Boston
- "Therefore I Am" (song), a 2021 single by Billie Eilish
- "Therefore I Am" (The Flash), a 2017 television episode

== See also ==
- Therefore I Am / Vanna, a 2016 EP
