= Brian Marquis =

American singer (born 1981)

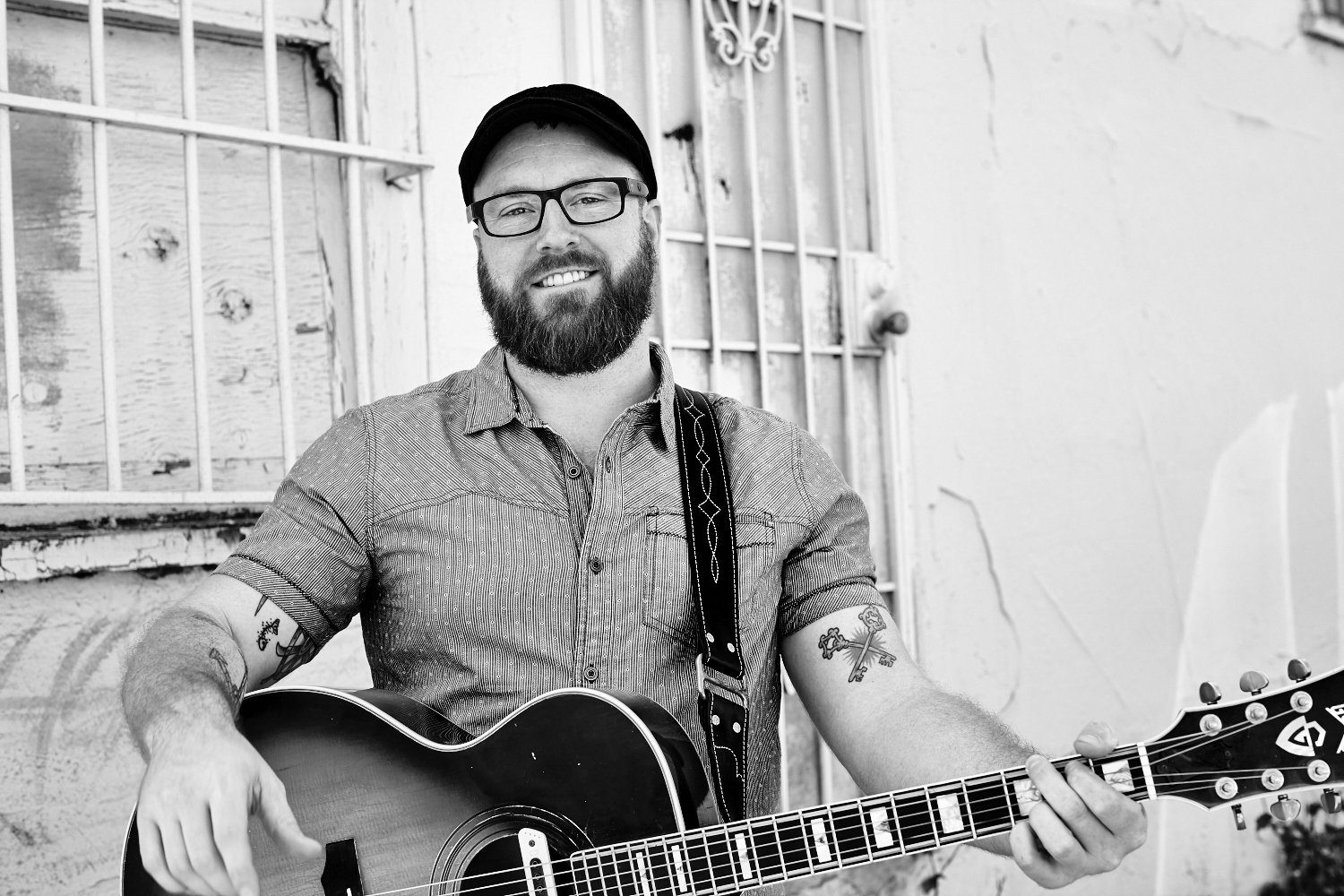

Background information
- Born: May 1, 1981 (age 45); Boston, Massachusetts
- Genres: Folk, americana, whiskey
- Occupation: Singer-songwriter
- Instruments: Vocals, guitar, harmonica
- Years active: 2006 – present
- Label: Equal Vision Records
- Website: brianmarquis.tumblr.com

Brian Marquis (born May 1, 1981) is an American singer-songwriter from Boston, Massachusetts. He debuted in 2014 with his solo full-length, album Blood & Spirits.

== Early life ==
Brian Marquis was born and raised in New England, splitting time growing up between the Northwest hills of Connecticut and Boston, Massachusetts. From the age of 13, he has served as a member of various bands before joining Therefore I Am, a Boston-based post-hardcore band, in 2006. As the guitarist in the band, this became the start of his professional music career.

== Career ==
=== Therefore I Am ===
The band developed a strong fan base following the strength of their ferocious live shows, and their 2006 EP You Are Connected. After successful years of touring, including spots on Vans Warped Tour and Rockstar Taste of Chaos Tour, the band was designated as a "Best Unsigned Band of the Month" by Alternative Press Magazine, and featured as one of the "Top Unsigned Bands in the U.S." on DailyChorus.com. The band released two albums before they announced their decision to break up in 2010. Brian expressed in an interview with Gaining Ground Media: "Being in a band is great, but sometimes you need something that is all under your control: musically and decision-wise."

=== Acoustic Basement Stage ===
When Marquis moved to Los Angeles in 2011, he approached Vans Warped Tour founder Kevin Lyman with the idea of an all-acoustic stage at the Vans Warped Tour. Lyman liked the idea and agreed to hire Marquis as Producer of the stage. The beginning of 2013 saw Marquis taking his idea of the Acoustic Basement out in its own run as The Acoustic Basement Tour, hitting intimate club performances around the US. Performers include: Front Porch Step, Rob Lynch, Aaron West and the Roaring Twenties, KOJI, Geoff Rickly, Bad Rabbits, Nick Santino, Transit, and John-Allison Weiss.

=== Solo music career ===
For his debut solo full-length, Marquis produced his new album in Los Angeles, CA with producer Doug Grean (Scott Weiland/Sheryl Crow/Velvet Revolver). The album, Blood & Spirits was released on May 13, 2014. The video for the single "From Boston" premiered on The Boston Globe on April 23, 2015. On May 12, 2015, Brian released an EP called I Miss the 90´s on Equal Vision Records. This EP included covers of five of his favorite songs from the 90´s. It also includes guest vocals by Vinnie Caruana (The Movielife, I am the Avalanche), Will Noon (Fun., Straylight Run) on drums, Julio Tavarez (Tha Black And The White, As Tall As Lions) on bass, and Doug Grean (ex-Scott Weiland, the Terpsichords) on piano/keyboards.

On July 27, 2013, Marquis was attempting to secure his stage's tent when lightning struck nearby and carried through to him. It all happened in Florida on the 2013 Vans Warped Tour. After the incident, he dropped out of the remaining tour dates to recover.

Marquis is currently a Tour Manager for Billie Eilish.

== Discography ==
=== Albums ===
- Blood & Spirits (2013)

=== Extended plays ===
- Snow Damage (2011)
- Beneath The Cover Is Earth (2012)
- Miss The 90´s (2015)

=== Singles ===
- "Born Free" (2013)
- "Too Close" (2013)
- "I Will Wait" (2013)

=== Appears on ===
- Summer 05 Demo (Therefore I Am, Self-released, 2005)
- The Modern World, A Battle Field (Therefore I Am, Self-released, 2005)
- Therefore I Am/Vanna Split 7" (Therefore I Am, Robotica Records, 2006)
- You Are Connected (Therefore I Am, Self-released, 2007)
- Escape (Therefore I Am, Self-released, 2007)
- "45 Miles" 7" Single (Therefore I Am, Equal Vision Records, 2009)
- The Sound of Human Lives (Therefore I Am, Equal Vision Records, 2009)
- Equal Vision Records 2014 Summer Sampler (Equal Vision Records, 2014)
