= In Case of Rapture =

In Case of Rapture may refer to:

- In Case of Rapture, an episode of the television program Six Feet Under (Season 4)
- In Case of Rapture, a song on the album You Can't Take It With You by As Tall As Lions
