= Closer to Found =

Canadian metalcore band

- Origin: Montreal, Quebec, Canada
- Genres: Metalcore, post-hardcore
- Years active: 2014–present
- Members: Lawrence Leylekian; Zackari Bourgeois; Yoan Desforges; Azalée Baillargeon
- Past members: Manuel Bureau; Tom Konidas; Benjamin Glover; Steven Vac; Fabien Baudouin

Closer to Found is a Canadian metalcore band from Montreal, Quebec, formed in 2014 by Lawrence Leylekian in the aftermath of his departure from Of Atlantis. Their current lineup consists of Lawrence Leylekian (Lead Vocals), Zackari Bourgeois (Clean Vocals), Azalée Baillargeon (Bass guitar), and Yoan Desforges (Drums). To date, the band has released their debut album Always Just As Lost along with three Music Videos.

== History ==
=== Formation (2014–2015) ===
Formation

Closer to Found was founded by lead vocalist Lawrence Leylekian during the early months of 2014 in Montreal QC, Canada. Having recently departed form his former band Of Atlantis, which he had joined after the band was already established, he sought to start his own project with which he would have complete creative freedom and control. Having previously recorded there, Lawrence quickly began working on what would later become Always Just As Lost at Bird Wazo studio. Throughout this process, Lawrence had been in contact with his good friend Zack (Zackari Bourgeois) to co-write lyrics and to potentially have a role in the band. The two knew each other from a previous metalcore band which also included former members Tom Konidas and Steven Vac, as well as Brandon French who would stand in for the band's first three music videos. When Zack arrived at Bird Wazo studio for the first time to collaborate on lyrics, Lawrence had him sing for an impromptu audition to become the band's clean vocalist. Having completed the audition much to Lawrence's delight, the two were set to front the band as dual vocalists.

Recording Always Just As Lost

Having completed the writing of their debut album in mid-2015, they immediately began searching for a drummer to record with. Through mutual connections, Lawrence came across Manuel Bureau who expressed interest in playing drums for the project Lawrence had started. By the end of 2015 Always Just As Lost had been recorded in its entirety and was now being mixed and mastered by Frank Daniel Shooflar at Bird Wazo studio.

2015 lineup

After the end of the recording of the Always Just As Lost, the band's lineup consisted of Lawrence Leylekian (Lead Vocals), Zackari Bourgeois (Clean Vocals), Manuel Bureau (Drums), Tom Konidas (Guitar), and Benjamin Glover (Bass guitar). This lineup would only play one show together before the lineup being altered due to the conflicting directions. In the fall of 2015 the band and Manuel Bureau would split. For the next two months following the departure of Manuel, Steven Vac would join the band and play the remaining shows of the year. By the end of 2015, the band would once again be without a drummer.

=== Always Just As Lost (2016–2017) ===
Pre-release

At the beginning of 2016, the band was set to film their first three music videos for their debut album Always Just As Lost. Being in a position with no current active drummer, "Listen Close And You Hear the Ocean", "Remember When", and "Ashes" were all filmed with Brandon French, a long time friend of Lawrence Leylekian, Zackari Bourgeois, and Tom Konidas, on (Drums). On April 28, 2016, the band officially released their first song "Pave Again" along with a lyric video. In mid-2016 Yoan Desforges was officially added to the band's lineup as the band's drummer, up until this point, all shows the band had undertaken were played using former drummer Steven Vac as a stand-in. On September 5, 2016, the band officially released their first music video "Remember When" simultaneously announcing the release date of their debut album. On October 25, 2016, their music video "Ashes" was released through New Noise Magazine.

Always Just As Lost release

On November 25, 2016, Closer to Found released their debut album Always Just As Lost. To celebrate this occasion, the band put together a show at Les Foufounes Électriques, a staple of the underground music scene in Montreal QC, Canada, on the day of the release.

Post-release

Following the release of Always Just As Lost, guitarist Tom Konidas would depart from the band, describing a change in personal direction as the reason. At the beginning of 2017, the band would welcome Fabien Baudouin as their new guitarist. On March 14, 2017, once again through New Noise Magazine, Closer to Found released their third music video "Listen Close And You Hear The Ocean" while simultaneously announcing their first US tour of the same name that took place from April 4 to 29, 2017. Before leaving for their US tour, the band and bassist Benjamin Glover parted ways for personal reasons. In mid-2017, Azalée Baillargeon was added to the lineup as bassist. Following this addition, guitarist Fabien Baudouin parted from the band for personal reasons.

== Musical style and influence ==
Closer to Found has often been associated with metalcore and post-hardcore. They themselves have commented on their style as being "heavy, groove-driven metalcore" drawing influences from such bands as Bring Me the Horizon, Issues, Norma Jean, Vanna, and Underoath.

== Band members ==
Current members

- Lawrence Leylekian – Lead Vocals (2014–Present)
- Zackari Bourgeois – Clean Vocals (2014–Present)
- Azalée Baillargeon – Bass guitar (2017–Present)
- Yoan Desforges – Drums (2016–Present)

Former members

- Manuel Bureau – Drums (2015)
- Tom Konidas – Guitar (2015–2016)
- Benjamin Glover – Bass guitar (2015–2017)
- Steven Vac – Drums (2015)
- Fabien Baudouin – Guitar (2017)

Session Musicians

- Steven Vac – Drums, Bass guitar (2016,2017)
- Brandon French – Drums (2016)

Timeline

== Discography ==
Closer to Found discography
- Studio albums: 1
- EPs: 0
- Singles: 4
- Music videos: 3

=== Studio albums ===
| Year | Details | Peak chart positions | | | | |
| Year | Details | US | US Alt. | US Hard Rock | US Rock | US Indie. |
|---|---|---|---|---|---|---|
| 2016 | Always Just As Lost: Release: November 25, 2016; Label: Unsigned; Formats: CD, Download | — | — | — | — | — |

=== Singles ===
| Year | Song | Album |
|---|---|---|
| 2016 | "Pave Again" | Always Just As Lost |
| 2016 | "Remember When" | Always Just As Lost |
| 2016 | "Ashes" | |
| 2017 | "Listen Close and You Hear the Ocean" | Always Just As Lost |

=== Music videos ===
| Year | Song | Album | Director | Type | Link |
|---|---|---|---|---|---|
| 2016 | "Remember When" | Always Just As Lost | J.P. Barcha Charlebois | Narrative | |
| 2016 | "Ashes" | Always Just As Lost | J.P. Barcha Charlebois | Narrative | |
| 2017 | "Listen Close and You Hear the Ocean" | Always Just As Lost | J.P. Barcha Charlebois | Narrative | |

=== Lyric videos ===
| Year | Song | Album | Link |
|---|---|---|---|
| 2016 | "Pave Again" | Always Just As Lost | |
