= You Can't Take It with You =

You Can't Take It with You may refer to:

- You Can't Take It with You (play), 1936 comedic play in three acts by George S. Kaufman and Moss Hart
  - You Can't Take It with You (film), 1938 film based on the play, starring Jean Arthur, Lionel Barrymore, and James Stewart
  - You Can't Take It with You (TV series), 1987 sitcom based on the play, starring Harry Morgan
- You Can't Take It with You (album), 2009 album by As Tall as Lions
- You Can't Take It With You, a BBC Radio 4 comedy series by Angela Barnes
- "You Can't Take It with You" (Las Vegas), a television episode

== See also ==
- "Can't Take It with You", a song by Marah
- "Can't Take It with You", a song by Alan Parsons Project on Pyramid
