= The Earth Sings Mi Fa Mi =

Studio album by The Receiving End of Sirens
- Released: August 7, 2007
- Recorded: February–April 2007
- Studio: SOMD (Beltsville, Maryland)
- Genres: Emo; progressive rock; arena rock
- Length: 65:54
- Label: Triple Crown
- Producer: Matt Squire

The Receiving End of Sirens chronology
Between the Heart and the Synapse (2005)	The Earth Sings Mi Fa Mi (2007)

The Earth Sings Mi Fa Mi is the second and final studio album by American rock band The Receiving End of Sirens. It is the band's first album with guitarist/keyboardist Brian Southall who joined the band after the departure of guitarist/vocalist Casey Crescenzo. This album was produced by Matt Squire (Panic! at the Disco, Boys Like Girls, Hit The Lights). Writing for the album occurred from October 2006 to January 2007. The album peaked at #130 on the Billboard 200, #3 on Top Heatseekers, and #15 on Top Independent Albums.

== Background and production ==
The Receiving End of Sirens released their debut album Between the Heart and the Synapse in April 2005, though independent label Triple Crown Records. The group promoted it with four US tours (supporting the likes of Gatsbys American Dream, Acceptance and Alexisonfire), stints on the Warped Tour and Taste of Chaos, leading up to the group's first headlining tour in early 2006. The members were suffering from interpersonal tension, which guitarist/vocalist Casey Crescenzo attributed to himself: "I was the epicenter ... There were too many creative egos, and I suppose mine had to be the loudest." He left the group after the conclusion of their headlining tour in May 2006, citing "many factors, personal and creative" as the reasoning.

However, it was later discovered he was suffering from a series of undiagnosed medical issues – namely, throat and stomach ulcers, kidney and pancreatic failure, burst lung capillaries and memory loss – that he was unable to afford care. Vocalist/bassist Brendan Brown and vocalist/guitarist Alex Bars handled the singing role for the remainder of their touring commitments for the year, which consisted of two further US tours, and treks of Canada and the UK, up to late 2006. Cody Bonnette of As Cities Burn filled Crescenzo's role for three months, though they didn't record or practice together, and was replaced by Brian Southall of Boys Night Out joined the band as their guitarist; he was previously their one-time touring manager. They went to a secluded llama farm in Connecticut, which was owned by Bars' grandparents, where they spent two months writing new material. Starting in February 2007, the group began recording their second album with producer Matt Squire. Sessions were held at SOMD studios, located in Beltsville, Maryland. On April 17, the band announced recording had concluded.

== Composition ==
=== Overview ===
The Earth Sings Mi Fa Mi is a concept album, which takes its story and title from Johannes Kepler, a 16th-century astronomer, in a book of his which the band were intrigued by. He theorized that the Solar System produced tones, such as Venus being a major sixth note, and the Earth as the relative minor sixth note, culminating in the Mi-Fa-Mi scale. Additionally he pondered on the idea that the Earth "'singing' Mi Fa Mi could truly stand for Misery, Famine, Misery and ultimately, that is the song the Earth and Venus continued to sing. Misery, referring to an empty place and Famine, referring to the appetite or thirst for things." Bars incorporated his love for astronomer Carl Sagan into the album.

The record's secondary topic is about a family breakdown; Brown wrote all of the lyrics, in contrast to their debut, where he collaborated on them with Crescenzo and drummer Andrew Cook. Musically, the sound of it has been described as emo, progressive rock, and arena rock. drawing a comparison to Kid A (2000)-era Radiohead. It utilized multi-layered vocals, in addition to call-and-response parts, with the tracks being sung from different perspectives, such as animals (in the track "Smoke and Mirrors"), planets and human beings. Unlike their debut album, which had Crescenzo handle all of the programming, all of the members contributed programming for their second album, and basted some of the tracks around it.

=== Tracks ===
The opening track "Swallow People Whole" is a quiet rock track with elements of electronic music, reminiscent of Depeche Mode. Brown woke up in a hotel room with the drum pattern and chorus melody in his head; he worked on the sequencing over the course of a night. It talks about being a stranger in one's own body and that one's actions didn't reflect their own perception of themselves. "Obilette (Disappear)" tackles the theme of emptiness, and features programming from Southall. "The Crop and Pest" discusses desire and features pomp rock-styled organ. One of the verses details an evil spirit using a human host as a home; it makes reference to a nautilus shell, which is done as a metaphor for perfection. The track reuses some of the lyrics from an outtake from the album sessions, "The Afterglow".

The almost seven-minute long number "The Salesman, the Husband, the Lover" was compared to Blue October. It is the start of the album's other topic, which discusses fracturing relationships that mentioned throughout the remainder of release. Brown based it on a fictional story he had written about a broken home. While working on the demo recording of the song, Brown did research on kids in broken families and incorporated various terms in the song: lightbulb, wishbone, rifle and telephone. The song was partially influenced by the poem I Go Back to May 1937 by Sharon Olds, which was a favorite of Brown's. "Smoke and Mirrors", which also talks about emptiness, opens with a spoken-word introduction. The song had been performed live sometime prior to recording in a different form. As they were in the studio, the overall structure and guitar melody during the chorus was changed.

"A Realization of the Ear" is another quiet rock track with electronic elements that ends with a choral section. "Saturnus" talks about dealing with a craving, and includes references to scratching, which are used to show "how it is often more pleasurable to pursue a temptation than to obtain said temptation." "Music of the Spheres" is an instrumental that leads into the penultimate track "The Heir of Empty Breath". It reaches the climax of the family storyline, and talks about begging to be taken away from emotional distress. The track features the combination of five different vocal melodies. The closing track "Pale Blue Dot" took its name from the Sagan book of the same title. The song is about becoming complacent with dissatisfaction, instead of choosing to do something about it.

== Release ==
In May 2007, the band supported Thrice on their brief US tour, and appeared at the Give it a Name festival in the UK. On June 1, The Earth Sings Mi Fa Mi was announced for release in August, and the album's track listing was revealed. Later in the month, "The Crop and the Pest" was posted on their PureVolume account. In June and July, the group supported Saosin on their headlining US tour. On July 19, "Saturnus" was posted the group's AbsolutePunk profile. Four days later, the band posted an e-card with snippets of music from the forthcoming album. The Earth Sings Mi Fa Mi was made available for streaming through the group's Myspace account on August 3, prior to its release through Triple Crown Records on August 7.

They embarked on a headlining US tour in August and September, with support from Emanuel, Envy on the Coast, Hopesfall, Strangler and Goodbye Tomorrow. The group supported New Found Glory and Senses Fail on their co-headlining US tour in October and November. In December, the band went on a headlining US tour with support from As Tall as Lions and Therefore I Am. A music video was released for "Smoke and Mirrors" on January 31, 2008. In February, the band played two shows in Australia with Thursday around the Soundwave festival. On March 19, the group announced they were breaking up.

== Reception ==
Professional ratings
Review scores
Source	Rating
The Albuquerque Tribune	Favorable
AllMusic	4.5/5 stars
Alternative Press	4/5
Melodic	4/5 stars
Sputnikmusic	4.5/5

The Earth Sings Mi Fa Mi received favorable reviews from music critics. AllMusic reviewer Jo-Ann Grene wrote that the theming made it "a complex set", and its music "even more so" with the group crafting "a dense tapestry of sound, multi-shaded and many colored." While noting this was also true of their debut album, "here they exude confidence and take it to a whole new level." Sputnikmusic staff member Adam Knott summarized the album in one word: "exhausting. It's exhausting to listen to, exhausting to write about, exhausting to think about", before clarifying, it was "painfully catchy" that the listener can "almost feel its hooks pummeling you, each one familiar but not quite recurring." He said it was a "difficult record" with a "brilliance [that] is ultimately so rewarding."

Pär Winberg of Melodic said the band performed the arena/progressive rock "real[ly] damn well." He found the album to have a "bunch of pompous songs", and overall said it was "far better" than their debut. Alternative Press writer Luke O'Neil said it had "[s]himmering harmonies, gutsy vocal straining that verges toward a scream," backed by "atmospheric breakdowns" to showcase "songwriting maturity," with "rolling storms of distortion and woe-is-me handwringing." Despite the band adding "absolutely nothing new to the formula", which he considered "pretty much perfect-you can’t fix a formula that’s already this awesome." The Albuquerque Tribune's Paul Maldonado said the band created an album that had "extraordinary lyrical depth" and "exquisite harmonies" with a "dual-guitar attack [which] sets the mood."

== Track listing ==
All music by The Receiving End of Sirens. All lyrics by Brendan Brown.

No.	Title	Length
1.	"Swallow People Whole"	5:45
2.	"Oubliette (Disappear)"	4:14
3.	"The Crop and the Pest"	4:49
4.	"The Salesman, the Husband, the Lover"	6:57
5.	"Smoke and Mirrors"	4:13
6.	"A Realization of the Ear"	4:37
7.	"Saturnus"	3:49
8.	"Wanderers"	5:05
9.	"Stay Small"	3:35
10.	"Music of the Spheres"	2:18
11.	"The Heir of Empty Breath"	7:44
12.	"Pale Blue Dot"	7:22
Total length:		61:28

Vinyl bonus track
No.	Title	Length
13.	"Weight/Wait"	6:23

== Personnel ==
- Alex Bars – lead vocals, guitars, programming
- Brendan Brown – lead vocals, bass guitar, programming, keyboards, glockenspiel
- Andrew Cook – drums, percussion, programming, glockenspiel
- Brian Southall – guitars, programming, keyboards, glockenspiel
- Nate Patterson – guitars, keyboards, glockenspiel
- Matt Squire – production, engineering, mixing, additional programming
- Heather Stebbins & Jessica Clough – strings
- Brad Filip – album art and websites (Official Site)
