= Between the Heart and the Synapse =

Studio album by The Receiving End of Sirens
- Released: April 26, 2005
- Recorded: Late 2004
- Genre: Post-hardcore; progressive rock; experimental rock
- Length: 70:48
- Label: Triple Crown
- Producer: Matt Squire, The Receiving End of Sirens

The Receiving End of Sirens chronology
The Receiving End of Sirens (2004)	Between the Heart and the Synapse (2005)	The Earth Sings Mi Fa Mi (2007)

Between the Heart and the Synapse is the debut studio album by American post-hardcore band the Receiving End of Sirens. It was released on April 16, 2005, via Triple Crown Records. The band signed to Triple Crown in October 2004, and began recording with producer Matt Squire later that month. Between the Heart and the Synapse uses elements of metal, progressive rock, and electronica, and has been compared to the works of Coheed and Cambria, Tool, and The Mars Volta.

Between the Heart and the Synapse received generally positive reviews from music critics, with particular compliments going towards the vocal harmonies and melding of genres, but it received some criticism for an overambitious runtime. It is the only release by The Receiving End of Sirens to feature Casey Crescenzo, who joined the band in January 2004, replacing Ben Potrykus, and left in May 2006. Following his departure, Cody Bonnette of As Cities Burn and Brian Southall of Boys Night Out filled Crescenzo's role on tour.

== Background ==
Bassist Brendan Brown and guitarist Alex Bars formed The Receiving End of Sirens during their first year of college at Northeastern University in 2003. The pair, who first started playing music together in their high school band Settle for Nothing, soon brought in guitarist Nate Patterson, drummer Andrew Cook, and vocalist Ben Potrykus. They played their first show together in March of that year, and embarked on a brief tour with Hidden in Plain View in August. As the band's success increased, Cook, Brown, and Bars elected not to continue their studies.

In November 2003, Potrykus, uncomfortable with signing to major label Atlantic Records and with the prospect of abandoning his studies at Emerson College, left the band, and Casey Crescenzo was hired as his replacement in January 2004. In October, the band signed to independent label Triple Crown Records to record their debut full-length record, set to be released between March and April 2005.

== Composition ==
=== Overview ===
Between the Heart and the Synapse has been described as a post-hardcore release, incorporating elements of punk rock, metal, progressive rock, and electronica, and earning the band comparisons to Coheed and Cambria, Tool, Refused, The Mars Volta, and The Artist in the Ambulance (2003)-era Thrice. Rather than following the verse–chorus form, the band prefers songs with free form structures, with the notable exception of "Planning a Prison Break." The use of multiple vocalists and guitarists allows The Receiving End of sirens to create three-part harmonies and riffs, occasionally supplemented by Crescenzo's screaming.

The band also incorporated programming, vocal manipulation, and programmed drums into the album, using clips of ambient electronic sounds. The studio in which Between the Heart and the Synapse was recorded was connected to a room where an orchestra was recording, and Crescenzo said in a 2013 interview with Alternative Press that he "had a backdoor to that room," and "bootlegged everything they were doing" to turn it into samples.

The album's title is taken from a line in the track "This Armistice." Brown has said that the album explores internal battles between the heart and the mind, and between the real and ideal self. The lyrics, predominantly written by Brown and Crescenzo, with some help from Cook, use wordplay and alliteration to tackle the themes of love, prison break, war, masturbation, the departure of Potrykus, and the tale of Romeo and Juliet. Members of Lux Courageous and Driving Silence contribute guest vocals to "Planning a Prison Break," "This Armistice," and "Epilogue," while Anthony Green of Circa Survive provided guest vocals on "Flee the Factory" and "Epilogue."

=== Tracks ===
Crescenzo sings the verse sections on "Planning a Prison Break," with Brown handling the first chorus, and Bars the second. All three sing the refrain, "This is the last night in my body," which is used as a motif throughout the album. Brown has said that the line is about being "unsatisfied with how I am living and vowing to my self to never just settle or accept the way I am living." "Planning a Prison Break," as well as parts of "This Armistice," were written while Potrykus was a member of the band, and were re-worked with Crescenzo. "The Rival Cycle" utilized electronic sounds following the song's breakdown, and features two different chorus sections being sung simultaneously. The pop punk-indebted "The Evidence" is followed by "The War of All Against All," which opens with a tribal drum pattern before shifting to a chorus section of changing rhythms that crescendo to the end.

The background chorus, guitar octaves, and slow percussion at the end of "The War of All Against All" provide a clean segue into "... Then I Defy You, Stars," which is in turn followed by the piano-driven, slow-building track "Intermission," and the hard rock number "This Armistice." "Broadcast Quality" begins with pop punk melodies before shifting into a breakdown and ending with a choral-esque vocal performance. The up-tempo piano track "Flee the Factory" ends in a jazzy interlude that segues into the opening synthesizer riff of "Dead Men Tell No Tales." Brown said that "Dead Men" was written about Potrykus, and that after he left, the band were "all really scared and felta s though we had dropped everything for this and now it was gone." The penultimate track, "Venona," was likened to Thrice, and is followed by the 13-minute closing post-rock track "Epilogue," which features a hidden track.

== Release ==
The band began 2005 on a US tour with As Tall as Lions and Cartel. Between the Heart and the Synapse was released on April 26, 2005, via Triple Crown Records. To promote the album, the band went on a US headlining tour in April and May, including an appearance at the Flipside Festival. This was followed by a three-week stint in May and June with Gatsbys American Dream and the Rocket Summer, and two shows at the Vans Warped Tour. After Warped Tour, the band joined Acceptance, Cartel, and Panic! at the Disco on the Take Cover tour in September and October. In November, they toured with Alexisonfire, and later played a few shows with Saves the Day and Senses Fail.

A music video for "Planning a Prison Break," was posted online on September 20, 2005. This was followed by a video for "This Armistice," which was filmed in February 2006 in Somers, Connecticut. Crescenzo directed the video for "This Armistice," and Brown called his former school principal, who in turn contacted the Recreation Department, to get permission to film in Somers. The video, which debuted on MTV2 and MTVu in April, depicted Adrian Amodeo, the band's manager, walking through a series of doors before passing through the final one, where the band is performing for a crowd of students.

After filming the "This Armistice" video, the band performed on the 2006 Taste of Chaos tour. In March 2006, Bars fell down a flight of stairs, where he suffered a scapular fracture, three fractured ribs, a punctured lung, and damaged vertebrae. In spite of this, the band chose not to cancel their spring headlining tour, with support from A Thorn for Every Heart, As Tall as Lions, the Blackout Pact, Yesterdays Rising, My American Heart, I am the Avalanche, and Hit the Lights. In May 2006, they played at The Bamboozle festival in New Jersey.

On May 21, 2006, Crescenzo left the band, citing "many factors, personal and creative." He was temporarily replaced by a friend, with Brown and Bars handling vocal duties for the remainder of the year. Over the summer, the band supported Boys Night Out on their headlining Canadian tour and Circa Survive on their US headlining tour. Following this, they toured the UK with Fightstar, and performed on the MTV2 Dollar Bill Tour in October and November. Cody Bonnette of As Cities Burn filled Crescenzo's role for three months, and was replaced by Brian Southall of Boys Night Out, formerly the band's touring manager. A music video for "The Evidence" was released on January 22, 2007. Between the Heart and the Synapse was released on vinyl in 2010, with a bonus track titled "Weightless Underwater" and new artwork from Matt Adams, who was inspired by the original while he was in college.

== Reception ==
Professional ratings
Review scores
Source	Rating
AllMusic	4.5/5 stars
IGN	7.8/10
Melodic	2/5 stars
Punknews.org	3/5 stars
Sputnikmusic	5/5

Between the Heart and the Synapse was met with generally favourable reviews from music critics. Sputnikmusic staff member Rowan5215 found it difficult to "nail down just what makes [it] such a goddamn great record," and praised the "amazingly co-ordinated and fierce" vocal harmonies, with each member "shining in their respective rights," while still "working as a flawless part of the team." AllMusic reviewer Bret Love wrote that it was "a pretty rare thing" to discover an act with an original sound, while proclaiming the band's genre-bending as "an engaging aural assault that is uniquely their own." He complimented producer Matt Squire for doing an "impressive job of capturing" the guitar work in a "crisp, clean mix that ensures not a single detail goes unnoticed." JR of IGN wrote that the band was "invested with a capacity for intriguing songwriting and an undeniable musicianship ... The music itself defies comprehensive description." He was also astounded by the varying mix of genres, saying that "the sound is too ethereal, too uniquely nuanced."

Some criticism was levied at the album's length. Punknews.org staff member Brian Shultz gave credit to the band's "potential and likewise developing talent," but considered Between the Heart and the Synapse "a tad overambitious for a debut," even if the band was able "to keep your attention intact for the disc's duration." Kaj Roth of Melodic, meanwhile, decried the album as adding "nothing new to the genre," and declared that "70 minutes is way too long for any emo band."

== Track listing ==
Track listing per booklet.

No.	Title	Length
1.	"Prologue"	0:42
2.	"Planning a Prison Break"	5:18
3.	"The Rival Cycle"	5:30
4.	"The Evidence"	4:18
5.	"The War of All Against All"	6:26
6.	"...Then I Defy You, Stars"	5:06
7.	"Intermission"	4:32
8.	"This Armistice"	5:55
9.	"Broadcast Quality"	4:48
10.	"Flee the Factory"	5:20
11.	"Dead Men Tell No Tales"	4:11
12.	"Venona"	5:33
13.	"Epilogue" ("Epilogue" ends at minute 3:14. A hidden track begins at minute 10:34.)	13:10
Total length:		70:48

Vinyl bonus track
No.	Title	Length
14.	"Weightless Underwater"	4:03

== Personnel ==
Personnel per booklet.

The Receiving End of Sirens

- Andrew Cook – drums, additional percussion
- Alex Bars – guitar, vocals
- Brendan Brown – bass, vocals
- Nate Patterson – guitar
- Casey Crescenzo – guitar, vocals, sequencing, piano, electric sitar

Additional musicians

- PJ Tepe – guest vocals (tracks 2, 8 and 13)
- Jani Zubkovs – guest vocals (tracks 2, 8 and 13)
- Justin Williams – guest vocals (tracks 2, 8 and 13)
- Archie Jamieson – guest vocals (tracks 2, 8 and 13)
- Ian Dexter – guest vocals (tracks 2, 8 and 13)
- Matt Flanders – guest vocals (tracks 2, 8 and 13)
- Anthony Green – guest vocals (tracks 10 and 13)

Production and design

- Matt Squire – producer
- The Receiving End of Sirens – producer
- Casey Crescenzo – additional production (tracks 1 and 7)
- Changethethought – album art, design
