= Therefore I Am / Vanna =

EP / Split by Therefore I Am & Vanna
- Released: March 10, 2006
- Recorded: Therefore I Am: Dec 2005– Jan 2006 @ Webster Lake Studios; Vanna: Jan 2006 @ Echo Room Productions
- Genre: Post-hardcore
- Length: 12:53
- Label: Robotica
- Producer: Chris Curran / Ian Van Opijnen

Therefore I Am chronology
You Are Connected (2006)	Therefore I Am / Vanna (2006)	Escape (2007)

Vanna chronology
This Will Be Our Little Secret (2005)	Therefore I Am / Vanna (2006)	The Search Party Never Came (2006)

The split EP by Vanna and Therefore I Am was a limited edition vinyl pressing and is now out of print. Each band contributed two songs. All of these songs were new except "Anniversary," which was a remastered version from Therefore I Am's Summer 2005 Demo. Brandon Davis played guitar for the band Therefore I Am and played drums for Vanna on this album. Vanna's first track on this record "Heavens To Betsy" was later redone for their debut album Curses, and Therefore I Am's first track "I Get Nervous In Cars" was later featured on their debut EP Escape.

In an interview with Bombshellzine, Vanna discussed the split album:

"Therefore I Am are really good friends of ours and are kinda like our brother band, like Brandon our drummer plays guitar for them. They pretty much are our best friends like we got to know when them when they already had an established fanbase and we played shows we them. We owe them a huge amount of credit. We put out that split under a small label, Robotica Records, and they were really nice. They had just started [the label] and ran it all themselves. They really wanted to help us."

The pressing was limited to 500 hand numbered copies in three different colors: white vinyl (300), blue vinyl (100), and pink vinyl (100). Each album was hand numbered. The artwork was designed by Vanna guitarist, Nicholas Lambert.

== Track listing ==
=== Side A: Therefore I Am ===
1. "I Get Nervous In Cars"
2. "Anniversary"

=== Side B: Vanna ===
1. "Heavens To Betsy"
2. "Reanimated"

== Personnel ==
=== Therefore I Am ===
- Alex Correia – vocals
- Aleks Kmiec – guitar, vocals
- Jim Creighton – bass, vocals
- Brandon Davis – guitar
- Chris Fernandes – drums and percussion
- Chris Curran – recording
- Colin Sapp – mastering

=== Vanna ===
- Nick Lambert – guitar, vocals
- Joe Bragel – vocals
- Brandon Davis – drums
- Sean Marquis – bass, vocals
- Evan Tyler Pharmakis – guitar
- Ian van Opijnen – recording
- Colin Sapp – mastering
