= All Hell =

Studio album by Vanna
- Released: July 8, 2016
- Genre: Post-hardcore, hardcore punk
- Length: 36:15
- Label: Pure Noise
- Producer: Will Putney

Vanna chronology
VOID (2014)	All Hell (2016)

All Hell is the sixth studio album by American post-hardcore band Vanna. The album was released on July 8, 2016.

== Track listing ==
All Hell track listing
No.	Title	Length
1.	"Paranoia Euphoria"	3:45
2.	"Pretty Grim"	3:07
3.	"Circle the Flame"	2:49
4.	"Flower"	5:15
5.	"Leather Feather"	3:32
6.	"Wounded Young"	3:53
7.	"Reaping a Whirlwind"	3:29
8.	"Candle Limbs"	3:36
9.	"Mutter"	2:48
10.	"Lead Balloon"	4:00

== Personnel ==
Vanna

- Davey Muise – lead vocals
- Nicholas Lambert – guitar
- Joel Pastuszak – guitar, vocals
- Shawn Marquis – bass
- Seamus Menihane – drums

Production

- Produced, mixed and mastered by Will Putney, at Graphic Nature Studios, Belleville, NJ
- Engineered by Randy LeBeouf
- Mix assistant/additional engineering by Steve Seid
- Additional tracking and engineering by Kevin Billingslea at The Halo Studio
- Art concept and direction by Liz Bergesch and Davey Muise
- Layout Design by Adam Toomey and Liz Bergesch
- Branding and illustration by Adam Toomey

== Charts ==
Chart (2016)	Peak position
US Top Hard Rock Albums (Billboard)	7
US Heatseekers Albums (Billboard)	2
US Top Rock Albums (Billboard)	19
