= Therefore I Am (band) =

2000s Boston-based post-hardcore band

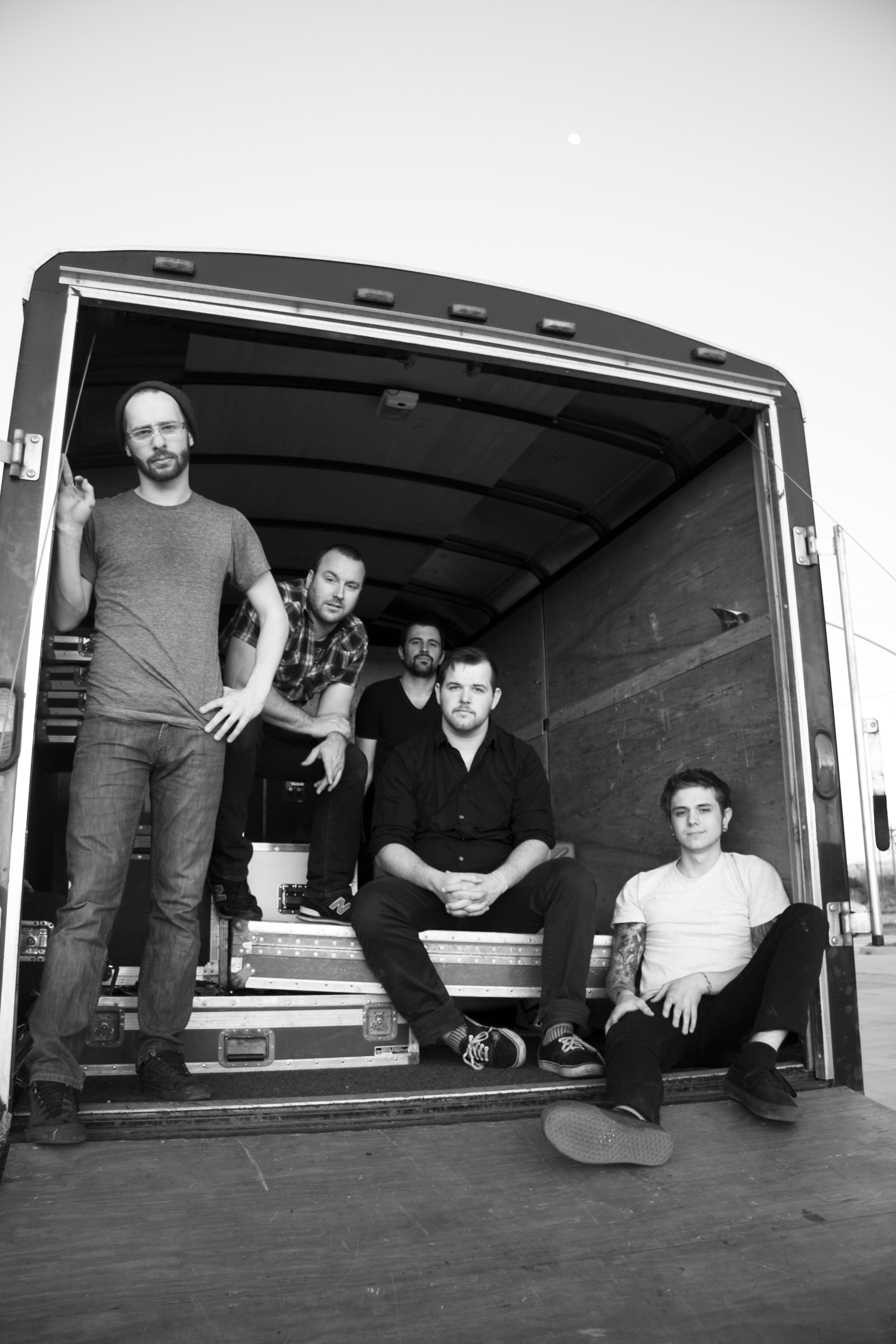

Background information
- Also known as: TIA
- Origin: Boston, Massachusetts
- Genres: Post-hardcore; Alternative rock Indie rock
- Years active: 2004–2010, 2024
- Label: Equal Vision Records
- Members: Alex Correia; Jim Creighton; Chris Fernandes; Brian Marquis; Travis Alexander
- Past members: Aleks Kmiec; Brandon Davis; Dan Sullivan
- Website: Official website

Therefore I Am was an American post-hardcore band formed in Boston in May 2004. After recording two independent extended plays, they signed to Epitaph Records in 2005 and later to Equal Vision Records in 2008, on which they recorded one full-length studio album. They disbanded on November 20, 2010.

== History ==
The band formed in May 2004 by bass player Jim Creighton, guitarist Brandon Davis, drummer Chris Fernandes, and guitarist Dan Sullivan. By early Summer, the group had welcomed singer Alex Correia. Alex had first grabbed the attention of the other members by submitting a copy of their distributed instrumental demo with his vocals recorded over the original tracks. Alex had recorded the vocal track in his bedroom. This demo would inevitably become their first song, "In Chelsea", which is where Alex was living at the time.

=== 2004 ===
In October 2004, Dan Sullivan made the decision to leave the band to continue his education. Within a month of his departure, however, the band enlisted guitarist Aleksander Kmiec. Aleks soon became known as "Aleks with a K" due to the spelling of his name, and to differentiate between the band's singer and guitarist. Within weeks, the band began playing shows again. However, between Aleks' arrival and the release of their first EP, the band played infrequently.

=== 2005 ===
The band's success did not begin to grow significantly until February 2005, with release of their first EP entitled "The Modern World, A Battlefield". In support of the release, the group tirelessly played at local venues and continued to write as their fan base grew. Their second independent release, simply entitled "The Summer EP", became available (strangely enough) in the fall of 2005, and was proof that the band members were maturing musically as individuals and as a whole.

During the summer of 2005, Brandon became a temporary drummer of the band Vanna. This quickly became a full-time commitment, and the band was signed to Epitaph Records before the end of the year. Brandon and the rest of the band members made the decision to have him leave Therefore I Am and continue playing drums for Vanna. His last show with the band would be in the winter of 2006.

During the fall of 2005, the band members completed recording the song, "I Get Nervous in Cars,". This version of the song was posted online and would later be released on the Therefore I Am/Vanna Split 7-inch and the "You Are Connected" EP. The split 7-inch was first made available at the Robotica Records album release party on March 10, 2006.

=== 2006 ===
Brian Marquis, Shawn Marquis' (Vanna) brother, stepped in to play guitar for TIA during early '06. At the time, the band decided to stop booking shows in order to concentrate on writing new material. However, their plans were put on hold again with yet another departure; Aleks chose to leave the band in late March 2006 to pursue other endeavors.

The band continued to play their booked shows with temporary guitarists. By spring of '06, TIA had met Travis Alexander and invited him to join the band by June '06. With a final line-up, Therefore I Am was able to tour, play regular local shows and record various demos including "Farewell via Park".

The year 2006 brought not only two new guitarists and their split 7-inch, but also their first full U.S. tour, two east coast tours, and the release of the "You Are Connected" EP. They also played the Ernie Ball Battle of the Bands Warped Tour stage in Boston, MA and cut a demo with esteemed producer Matt Squire (People In Planes, Panic! at the Disco, The Used).

=== 2007/2008 ===
In 2007 they landed the opening spot on Rockstar's Taste of Chaos in Boston, MA, were featured in Alternative Press Magazine as a "Best Unsigned Band of the Month" and featured as one of the "Top Unsigned Bands in the U.S." on DailyChorus.com. They entered the studio with Mike Poorman (Piebald, Tsunami Bomb, Paulson) that August to record the EP entitled "Escape". At the end of the year, in support of the self-released EP, they went on a small tour with Vanna, then shortly after with As Tall As Lions and The Receiving End of Sirens. During 2008 they did multiple tours in support of Escape, played The Receiving End of Sirens' final shows with Envy on the Coast in Providence, RI and Hit The Lights in Allston, MA, then on August 20, 2008, they announced that they had signed with Equal Vision Records.

=== 2009 ===
The band finished recording their Equal Vision debut in early 2009 and announced they would be playing the entire Warped Tour via the Skullcandy Stage. They then went out on a month-long tour through the Pacific Northwest with Confide, Oceana, and To Speak of Wolves. In March, they were featured on the Warped Tour website as one of the bands "Kevin Wants You to Know" by Warped Tour owner Kevin Lyman.

Their Equal Vision Records debut The Sound Of Human Lives was released on June 23, 2009. The songs "Splinters" and "I Am Only An Island" can be heard on their Myspace, and "I Am Only An Island" can also be downloaded as a part of the Equal Vision Records sampler on the Equal Vision website.

On December 9, 2009, Therefore I Am released a video for "I Am Only An Island."

On February 2, 2010 "I Am Only An Island" premiered on MTV2's Headbanger's Ball.

=== Breakup ===
On September 22, 2010, Therefore I Am announced their decision to break-up. They have not released any reasoning to it other than it being for personal reasons. November 20, 2010 was the band's final show.

Therefore I Am played their last show on November 20, 2010, at Lupo's Heartbreak Hotel in Providence, Rhode Island to a sold out crowd.

=== Reunion shows ===
Therefore I Am reunited in 2012, performing a sold out show on Friday December 21 and again on Saturday December 22 at "The Sinclair" in Cambridge, MA. The band hosted a second round of reunion shows in December 2016. A third reunion occurred at Roadrunner on July 27, 2024, in Boston, supporting the 15th anniversary of Vanna's album A New Hope. My Fictions and Light Speaks also played at the event.

== Members ==
Final line-up

- Travis Alexander – guitar
- Alex Correia – vocals
- Jim Creighton – bass guitar
- Chris Fernandes – drums
- Brian Marquis – guitar and vocals

== Discography ==
- Summer 05 Demo (Self-released, 2005)
- The Modern World, A Battle Field (Self-released, 2005)
- Therefore I Am/Vanna Split 7-inch (Robotica Records, 2006)
- You Are Connected (Self-released, 2006)
- Escape (Self-released, 2007)
- "45 Miles" 7-inch Single (Equal Vision Records, 2009)
- The Sound of Human Lives (Equal Vision Records, 2009)
