= The Receiving End of Sirens =

American rock band from Belchertown, Massachusetts

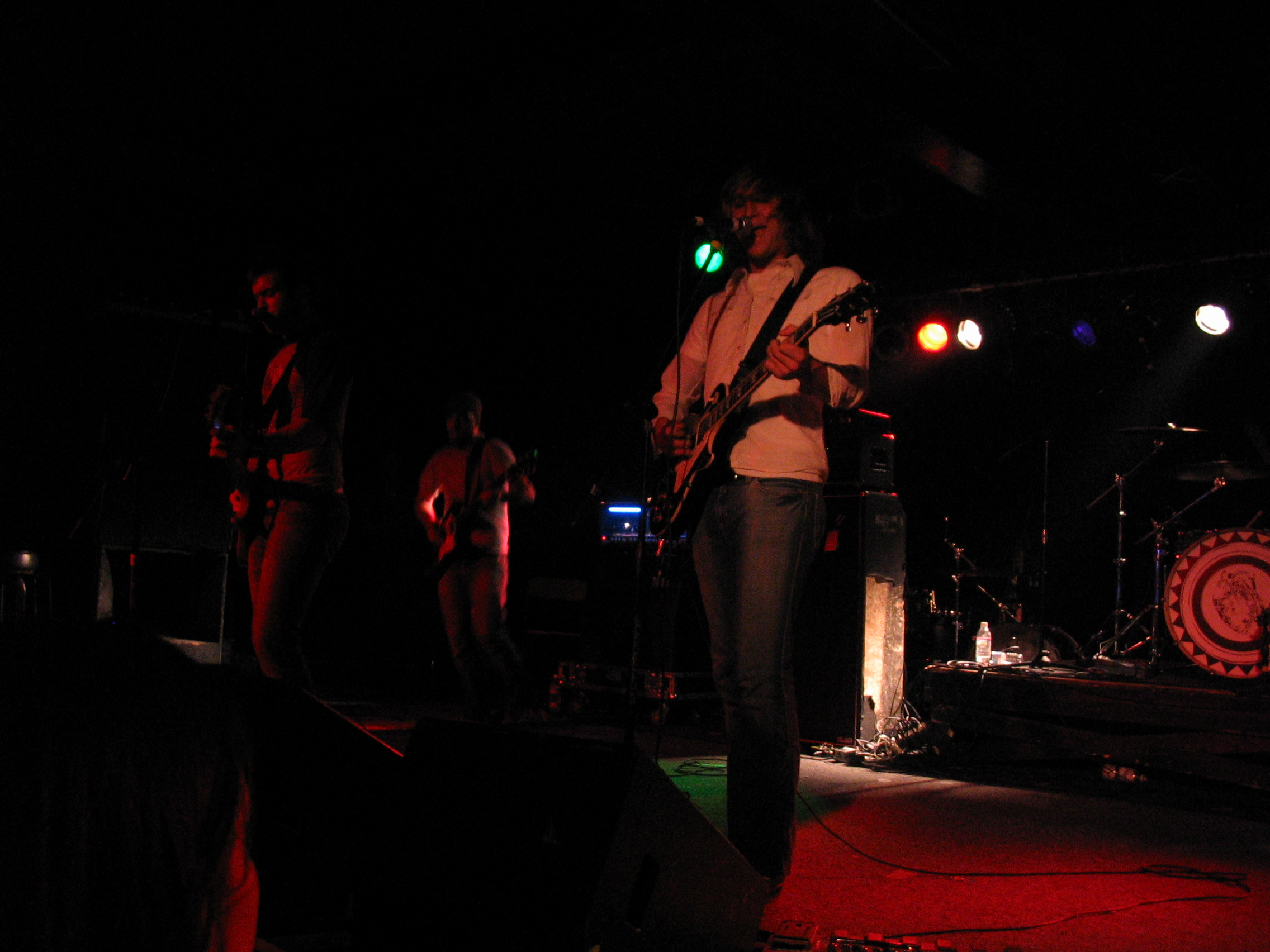
- TREOS in 2005 at The Masquerade in Atlanta.

Background information
- Also known as: TREOS
- Origin: Belchertown, Massachusetts, U.S.
- Genres: Post-hardcore; ambient; progressive rock; emo
- Years active: 2003–2008, 2010–2012, 2019–2020, 2025
- Label: Triple Crown
- Spinoffs: Black Cards, The Dear Hunter, Isles & Glaciers, Boys Night Out, A Rocket to the Moon, Kid Infinite
- Past members: Alex Bars; Brendan Brown; Nate Patterson; Andrew Cook; Brian Southall; Casey Crescenzo; Ben Potrykus
- Website: www.treos.live

The Receiving End of Sirens (abbreviated TREOS) is an American rock band from Belchertown, Massachusetts, United States. Formed in 2003, the band broke up in 2008 then briefly reunited in 2010; a 2020 reunion tour was canceled.

== Overview ==
The band played on the 2005 Warped Tour and toured with such acts as Gatsbys American Dream, A Wilhelm Scream, Thirty Seconds to Mars, Funeral for a Friend, Saves the Day, Senses Fail, Thrice, and New Found Glory.

The band's first headlining tour, "The New Hope Tour," began on March 31, 2006. About a week before the start of the tour, guitarist and vocalist Alex Bars fell down a flight of stairs, breaking his scapula and two ribs and puncturing a lung; a question of whether or not he would be able to perform arose, yet he was able to continue. Some of the bands who supported the band on their first headlining tour were As Tall as Lions, A Thorn for Every Heart, Hit the Lights, and I Am the Avalanche.

On March 18, 2008, the band announced that it would "no longer exist in the way it has for the past 5 years" on their MySpace page. The main reason for the breakup was that Brendan Brown had a child in January 2008, and he decided he needed to reassess his priorities. In a MySpace bulletin, he wrote that all of the members still had a passion for music and love for their fans. The band played two of their last three last shows at Lupo's in Providence, Rhode Island, on May 2, supported by Envy on the Coast and Therefore I Am, and at The Bamboozle Festival in East Rutherford, New Jersey on May 4. On May 5, a final farewell was performed under the pseudonym The Red Eye of Soromon at Harper's Ferry in Allston, Massachusetts.

== Name ==
According to drummer Andrew Cook:

I was a cook at a place called McCarthy's Pub in Massachusetts. A bunch of police cars and ambulances went screaming by and the name popped into my head. Like, thinking about how people never really think about what's "on the receiving end of sirens," because it's such a common thing just to hear the sirens. Especially if you live in a city, it just becomes this commonplace thing, nobody thinks twice about it anymore. Even though there's so much awful stuff going on in the world, and horrible things that happen to people, it's kind of like "out of sight, out of mind." It's just kind of a sad thing. So it's kind of a commentary on that. It also works on a couple of levels. It can be taken as the Greek mythology example with the sirens that lure sailors in with their singing, so being on the receiving end of those sirens isn't a great thing. It works both ways.

The band has also been known to perform under the pseudonym The Red Eye of Soromon [sic], also abbreviated TREOS. Cook explained the name change in an interview:

Sometimes we just feel like playing a show near home and not announcing it as a TREOS show, just keeping it small and intimate and stuff. And you know, when you play a lot of shows you have to worry about your draw, and a lot of bands will purposefully not play their hometown area for a long time to build up a draw. It's something that every band needs to be conscious of. And for us, we got to thinking, "We haven't played a show in Massachusetts for a long time, kind of purposefully "We need to give ourselves a break and not saturate the market so people don't care about seeing us anymore," you know? And it got to the point where like, "Man, we miss playing hall shows and stuff. Let's just do one," and we talked to Alex [Correia] from Therefore I Am because we love those guys and love playing with them, and worked it out. He set up the show and it just worked out great. People have caught on and every time they see The Red Eye of Soromon they're going to know it's us, but it's just something to do to be fun, you know, just be goofy about it, show people that we don't take ourselves too seriously and that we still love playing shows like this. Playing big shows is great, and playing big clubs is great, but it loses something at that level, you know? And it's not as intimate and off-the-cuff and random as shows like these, and we love doing it, so we're going to keep doing it as long as we're a band, regardless of how well or how poorly the band does from here on out.

The last performance under the pseudonym was on May 16, 2012.

== History ==
=== Formation and EP (2003–2004) ===
The band formed in 2003, and their original lineup consisted of Brendan Brown, Alex Bars, Andrew Cook, Nate Patterson, and Ben Potrykus, formerly of Massachusetts pop-punk band Fake-ID. With this lineup, they recorded two demos with a total of five songs, including two versions of "The Race", and gained a following throughout New England. After a conflict of interest involving the future of the band and their signing with a record label, Ben left the band. They played their last show with this lineup on November 8, 2003, in Fitchburg, Massachusetts.

After almost 6 months on hiatus, the band came back to life with their new member Casey Crescenzo. They played their first show with the new lineup on April 20, 2004, in Amherst, Massachusetts. Their new lineup featured three-tiered vocals split by Crescenzo, Bars, and Brown and the addition of keyboards and synth. At this time they also released their self-titled five-song EP.

=== Between the Heart and the Synapse (2005–2006) ===
In April 2005 their full-length album Between the Heart and the Synapse was released. To support the album, the band toured with Acceptance, Panic! At the Disco, Cartel, and Augustana.

After a year of touring, Casey Crescenzo left the band in May 2006 and started pursuing his side project, The Dear Hunter, full-time. After Crescenzo's departure, a long-time friend of the band Ross filled in on guitar during their tour with Circa Survive and most notably at radio station WFNX's "Disorientation" free concert in Boston featuring TREOS and Taking Back Sunday.

On November 6, 2006, TREOS announced former Boys Night Out drummer Brian Southall was joining the band, playing guitar, keys, and backup vocals.

=== The Earth Sings Mi Fa Mi and breakup (2007–2009) ===
TREOS's second album The Earth Sings Mi Fa Mi was released on August 7, 2007. The band had arranged to stream a live concert from Vintage Vinyl Record Store in New Jersey on the new real-time entertainment site www.Yebotv.com on August 9, 2007.

On March 18, 2008, Brendan Brown announced via a MySpace bulletin that because of his new priorities (having a baby), the band was coming to an end.

On Friday, May 2, 2008 the band headlined its farewell show at Lupo's in Providence, Rhode Island, with Envy on the Coast and Therefore, I Am. Former singer Casey Crescenzo made a return halfway through the set; TREOS performed virtually all of their tracks, forcing them to repeat "Planning a Prison Break" as their encore. Absolute Punk wrote that "They played 21 songs (technically 22 because the crowd got them to play "Planning a Prison Break" twice) – almost every track spanning their three CD discography."

The band recorded their farewell show at Lupo's on May 2, 2008; however, there was no announcement stating a release date. Along with concert footage, the DVD will contain never-before-seen interviews, as well as backstage footage from many of the band's tours. The live concert footage will span twenty-two songs and will feature Casey Crescenzo for the latter half of the performance.

The band also played The Bamboozle on May 4, 2008 and performed their final show as The Red Eye of Soromon in Allston, MA on May 5, 2008, where they played all of Between the Heart and the Synapse in order from start to finish with Casey, followed by an encore set.

On November 25, 2008, the band posted a video of "Planning a Prison Break" life from their final May 2 show. This hinted that a DVD may be officially announced shortly. On June 6, 2009, the first news pointing towards a closer release date was found at Absolute Punk, where TREOS asked for fans to send in pictures of them with the band. The rumors of a DVD were confirmed when the latest video was posted on the official Skatefest website, in which members of TREOS discussed the DVD.

After the breakup of the Receiving End of Sirens, Brian Southall began working on a new project titled The Company We Keep.

=== Reunion (2009–present) ===
On December 22, 2009, Brian Southall confirmed that TREOS would be reuniting to play Skate Fest 2010 in Worcester, Massachusetts. The Skate Fest web page was updated with a previously-unreleased video of "The War of All Against All" from the farewell show in Providence. Casey Crescenzo confirmed that he would once again be joining the band on stage at Skate Fest.

The band played one more show before Skate Fest at Jerkies in Providence, Rhode Island. The flyer for the show read "The Real Eve Of Skatefest" (a backronym for TREOS) and included the bands Envy on the Coast, All the Day Holiday, Lions Lions, and a special unannounced guest.

In late 2010, several members of the band hinted that they were recording new songs via Twitter. Brian Southall, Brendan Brown, Andrew Cook, and Nate Patterson all replied to each other's tweets, often capitalizing the letters "T-R-E-O-S" in each tweet, such as Southall's post, "tracking guitars, This Really Epic Original Song I wrote with some friends a few months ago."

Triple Crown Records later confirmed that they would be re-releasing Between the Heart and the Synapse as a double LP, along with a new song by the band and live videos. The members took time off from their current projects to write and record the new song for the release. John D, creator of The Bamboozle Festival, announced that TREOS would play at the 2012 festival on May 18 in Asbury Park, New Jersey for the festival's 10th anniversary.

TREOS (under the pseudonym "The Red Eye of Soromon") played The Middle East night club in Cambridge, Massachusetts on May 16, 2012.

On February 17, 2020, the band's official Twitter page announced a tour with Envy on the Coast; it was later called off due to the COVID-19 pandemic.

In December 2024, the band announced a reunion show in Boston for 2025. TREOS released a previously unavailable b-side entitled "Weightless Underwater" on February 27, 2025.

Andrew Cook is currently a full-time touring drummer for country act Dan + Shay.

== Band members ==
=== Final line-up ===
- Brendan Brown – vocals, bass (2003–2008, 2010–2012, 2019 - 2020, 2025)
- Alex Bars – vocals, guitar (2003–2008, 2010–2012, 2019 - 2020, 2025)
- Nate Patterson – guitar, keyboards (2003–2008, 2010–2012, 2019 - 2020, 2025)
- Andrew Cook – drums, programming (2003–2008, 2010–2012, 2019 - 2020, 2025)
- Casey Crescenzo – vocals, guitar, keyboards, programming (2004–2006, 2010–2012, 2019 - 2020, 2025)
- Brian Southall – guitar, keyboards, percussion, backing vocals (2006–2008, 2010–2012, 2019 - 2020, 2025)

=== Former ===
- Ben Potrykus – lead vocals (2003)

== Discography ==
Release date	Title	Label
August 9, 2004	The Receiving End of Sirens EP	Self-released
April 25, 2005	Between the Heart and the Synapse	Triple Crown Records
August 7, 2007	The Earth Sings Mi Fa Mi	Triple Crown Records
November 9, 2010	Between the Heart and the Synapse (Deluxe Edition)	Triple Crown Records
April 21, 2012	Songs//2003 EP	

== Videography ==
- "Planning a Prison Break" (2005)
- "This Armistice" (2006)
- "The Evidence" (2007)
- "Smoke & Mirrors" (2007)
