= Void (Vanna album) =

VOID

Studio album by Vanna
- Released: June 17, 2014
- Recorded: March – May 2014, @ The Machine Shop, Weehawken, NJ
- Genre: Melodic hardcore; post-hardcore
- Length: 36:22
- Label: Pure Noise
- Producer: Will Putney

Vanna chronology
| Preying/Purging (2013) | VOID (2014) | All Hell (2016) |

Professional ratings
Review scores
| Source | Rating |
|---|---|
| AllMusic | 3.5/5 stars |
| Alt Press | 3.5/5 stars |
| Rock Sound | 6/10 |

VOID is the fifth studio album by the punk rock band Vanna. It was released in 2014 on Pure Noise Records. The album was the band's first release on the record company. It marks a change to their sound, as it is more melodic and aggressive than their previous releases. The band streamed the album on SoundCloud in full a week before release. The album had its highest release and first appearance on the Billboard top 200, with sales over 1800+ copies and charting at #157 along with charting on Heatseeker (#20). This was attributed to their successful performance on the 2014 Vans Warped Tour.

== Track listing ==
| No. | Title | Length |
|---|---|---|
| 1. | "Void" | 2:42 |
| 2. | "Toxic Pretender" | 3:51 |
| 3. | "Holy Hell" | 3:05 |
| 4. | "Diggin" | 4:10 |
| 5. | "Yüth Decay" | 2:22 |
| 6. | "Personal Cross" | 3:36 |
| 7. | "Humaphobia" | 2:21 |
| 8. | "Piss Up a Rope" | 3:07 |
| 9. | "Pornocopia" | 3:24 |
| 10. | "All American't" | 2:41 |
| 11. | "Bienvenue" | 5:03 |

== Personnel ==
Vanna

- Davey Muise – vocals
- Nicholas Lambert – guitar
- Joel Pastuszak – guitar, vocals
- Shawn Marquis – bass, vocals
- Eric Gross – drums

Production

- Produced, mixed and mastered by Will Putney at The Machine Shop, Weehawken, New Jersey
- Engineered by Randy LeBeouf
- Edited by Tom Smith Jr.
- Artwork by Nicholas Lambert
