= Blood and Aphorisms =

2002 extended play by As Tall as Lions

EP by As Tall as Lions
- Released: September 2002
- Recorded: 2002
- Studio: VuDu Studios (Freeport, NY)
- Genres: Pop rock; Indie rock; Alternative rock
- Length: 22:33
- Label: Self-released
- Producers: Mike Watts and Rich Leigey

As Tall as Lions chronology
Blood and Aphorisms (2002)	Lafcadio (2004)

Blood and Aphorisms is the first EP by the band As Tall as Lions, which was self-released in September 2002. Four of the songs on the EP were later re-recorded and re-released for the band's debut studio album Lafcadio (2004).

== Track listing ==
1. "Break Blossom"*
2. "Dancing in the Rearview"
3. "And the Wick Burnt Black"* (re-recorded as "Ghost in Drag")
4. "A Fighting Word"
5. "If I'm Not Out Burning"*
6. "Goodnite, Noises Everywhere"*

* = re-recorded for Lafcadio.
