= Of Atlantis =

Canadian metalcore band

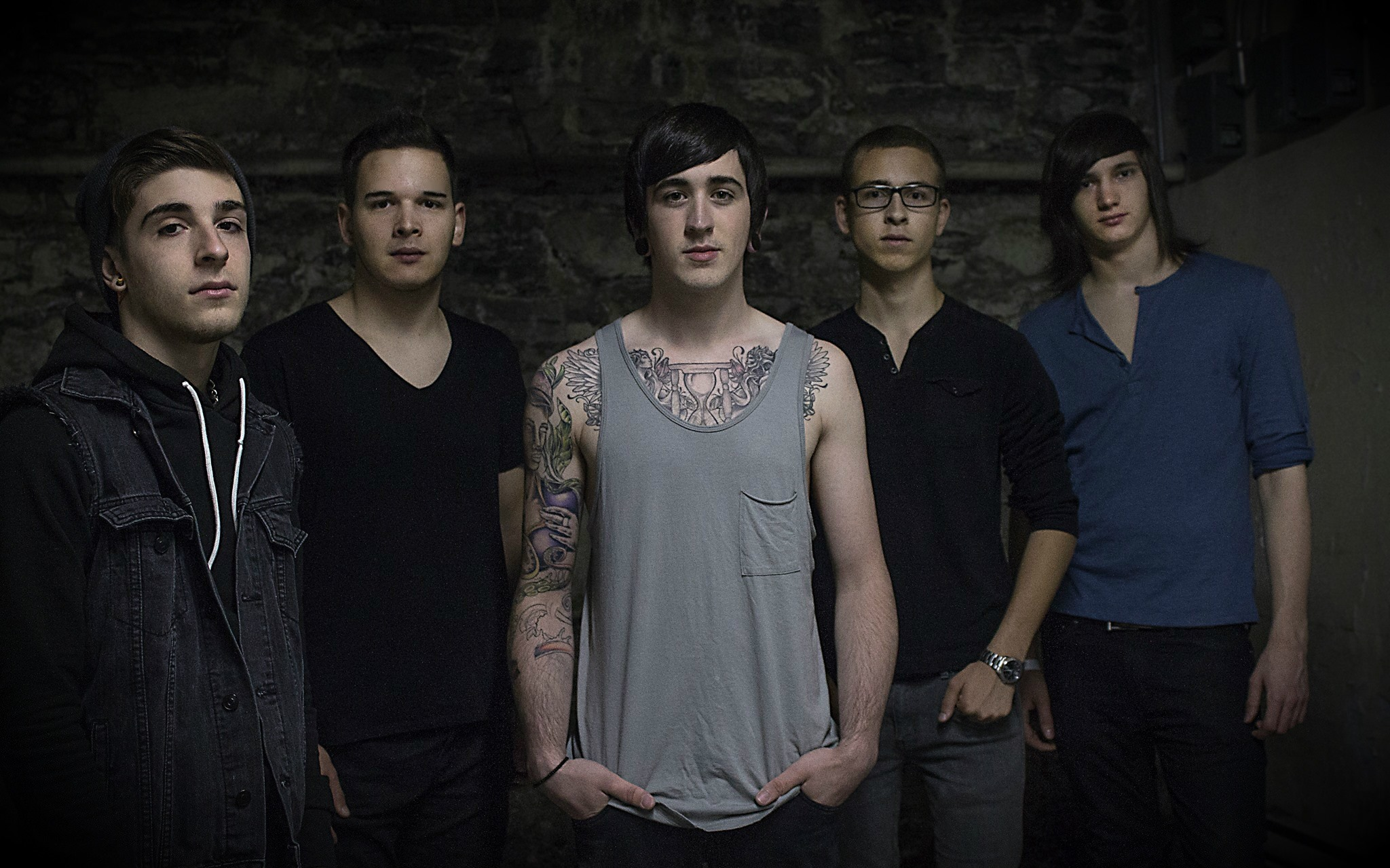
- From left to right: Donny Baldassare, Jonathan Gagné, Karl Dufresne, Ramzi Benamara, Lawrence Leylekian

Background information
- Origin: Montreal, Quebec, Canada
- Genres: Metalcore, Melodic Metalcore
- Years active: 2012–present
- Members: Karl Dufresne; Ramzi Benamara; Jonathan Gagné; Lawrence Leylekian; Donny Baldassare
- Past members: Steve Dupuis; Denis Potapov; Jean-Christophe Dagenais; Francis Belisle

Of Atlantis is a Canadian metalcore band from Montreal, Quebec formed in 2012 by members Ramzi Benamara and Jonathan Gagné. Their current lineup consists of Karl Dufresne (lead vocals), Ramzi Benamara (guitar/clean vocals), Jonathan Gagné (guitar), Lawrence Leylekian (bass guitar), and Donny Baldassare (drums). To date, the band has released 2 singles and is currently working on their first EP.

== History ==
=== Formation, and first releases (2012–2013) ===
Formation

Of Atlantis was founded by guitarist/clean vocalist Ramzi Benamara and guitarist Jonathan Gagné during early 2012 in Montreal, Quebec, Canada. The two had previously played in several punk rock and rock projects together but their desire to play hardcore music drove them to form Of Atlantis. Soon after forming, they encountered Francis Belisle through a YouTube vocal cover and contacted him about starting a post-hardcore band. After Belisle joined, the group met Jean-Christophe Dagenais, who was a guitarist but agreed to fill in at bass guitar seeing as the band did not need another guitarist.

"Hopeless"

Throughout the formation of the band, guitarist/clean vocalist Ramzi Benamara had begun composing what would become the band's first single "Hopeless". After the completion of "Hopeless", the band decided to announce its formation with this single. They recorded "Hopeless" at Bird Wazo studio in June 2012 and released it on the June 28, 2012. The lyric video for "Hopeless" was made by the band's own lead vocalist Francis Belisle and was released with the single on June 28, 2012. Soon after the release, lead vocalist Francis Belisle decided to part ways, and was replaced by the band's then bassist Jean-Christophe Dagenais. The move from bass guitar to lead vocals left the band without a bassist as well as still looking for a drummer. In July 2012, they were introduced to drummer Denis Potapov through a contact at Bird Wazo studio and to bassist Steve Dupuis through their new lead vocalist Jean-Christophe Dagenais.

"Perceptions"

Immediately after the release of their first single, Ramzi Benamara began composing the band's latest single even though the band was going through some lineup changes. Once the band completed composing "Perceptions" they recorded it at Bird Wazo studio in September 2012. Upon completion of the recording, they planned to shoot a music video to release the song with, however, in December 2012 their lead vocalist Jean-Christophe Dagenais decided to part ways for personal reasons. As a result, the plans for the music video were delayed and ultimately cancelled in favour for a lyric video. In February 2013, Karl Dufresne became the new lead vocalist of the band, and shortly after his induction, bassist Steve Dupuis and drummer Denis Potapov were parted from the band. In March 2013, bassist Lawrence Leylekian joined the band. Shortly after, on March 31, 2013, "Perceptions" was officially released with its lyric video that was designed by Neighborkid Productions via the BryanStars YouTube channel. Following the release, drummer Donny Baldassare joined the band to complete the lineup in April 2013.

=== Chapter I: Origins (2013–present) ===
Concept

Of Atlantis recorded their first studio EP at Bird Wazo, Chapter I: Origins. This album was released on April 22, 2014. This album was a concept album based on the French quote "L'Homme naît naturellement bon, c'est la société qui le corrompt" – J. J. Rousseau, which literally translates to "Man is born naturally good, it is society that corrupts". The album lyrics describe a fictional story in which the main character develops a complex based on a troublesome childhood that leads to trust issues, existential questioning, bitterness, hostility, and ultimately the development of a deeply rooted hatred.

== Band name ==
The name Of Atlantis was brought together by former lead vocalist Francis Belisle and guitarist/clean vocalist Ramzi Benamara. Francis Belisle had suggested to use Atlantis as part of the name, but it did not feel complete solely with Atlantis, so Ramzi Benamara proposed to add the preposition Of in front and from then on the name Of Atlantis was permanent.

== Band members ==
Current members

- Karl Dufresne – Lead Vocals (2013–present)
- Ramzi Benamara – Guitar/Clean Vocals (2012–present)
- Jonathan Gagné – Guitar (2012–present)
- Lawrence Leylekian – Bass guitar (2013–present)
- Donny Baldassarre – Drums (2013–present)

Past members

- Steve Dupuis – Bass guitar (2012–2013)
- Denis Potapov – Drums (2012–2013)
- Jean-Christophe Dagenais – Bass guitar/Lead Vocals (2012)
- Francis Belisle – Lead Vocals (2012)

== Discography ==
Singles

Year	Title	Producer
2012	Hopeless	Bird Wazo
2013	Perceptions	Bird Wazo

Albums

Year	Title	Producer	Album/EP
2014	Chapter I: Origins	Bird Wazo	EP

== Videography ==
Music Video

Year	Song	Videographer
2014	Alter Ego	TBA

Official Lyric Video

Year	Song	Animator
2012	Hopeless	Francis Belisle
2013	Perceptions	Neighborkid Productions
2014	Borderline	Jorgan Leslie Redick of Neighborkid Productions

== See also ==
- Closer to Found
