= As Tall as Lions (album) =

2006 studio album by As Tall as Lions

Studio album by As Tall as Lions
- Released: August 8, 2006
- Recorded: 2006
- Studio: VuDu Studios (Freeport, NY)
- Genres: Alternative rock; indie rock; emo
- Length: 45:22
- Label: Triple Crown
- Producers: Mike Watts and Steve Haigler

As Tall as Lions chronology
Lafcadio (2004)	As Tall as Lions (2006)	Into the Flood (2007)

Professional ratings
Review scores
Source	Rating
AbsolutePunk	(90%)
Alternative Press	5/5 stars
Pitchfork	(5.3/10.0)
PopMatters	(8/10)

As Tall as Lions is the second full-length studio album by As Tall as Lions. It was released August 8, 2006 on Triple Crown Records.

== Recording and production ==
The album took seven months to write and two months to record. It was produced by Mike Watts and Steve Haigler at VuDu Studios in Freeport, NY, a duo that offered to help with their record after they had gone to one of their shows. The album was released on CD and Limited Edition Vinyl.

== Lyrics ==
The lyrics for the album were primarily written by Saen Fitzgerald, but each member contributed.

The writing of the lyrics for "Song for Luna" began with the word "summer" (which was also a working title for the track), which was a suggestion from Nigro.

Fitzgerald wrote the lyrics for the track "Stab City" based on a friend's description of the Irish city of Limerick, although Fitzgerald had never visited.

The track "Ghost of York" refers to the English city of York, but Fitzgerald says the lyrics describe a story that is "basically a metaphor for imaginary friends and trying to connect with somebody when there’s nobody there and you end up connecting with your own self".

== Critical reception ==
The album received generally positive reviews. AbsolutePunk gave it a rating of 9 out of 10, comparing the band to Damien Rice, U2, and The Mars Volta among others. PopMatters was similarly enthusiastic, rating it 8 out of 10 and calling it "skillful, beautiful, and musically significant". Alternative Press, known for reviewing mostly rock and indie bands, gave the album 5 out of 5 stars and listed the band among their 2008's Most Anticipated Bands due to this "self-titled masterpiece".

== Track listing ==
All tracks are written by Daniel Nigro, Saen Fitzgerald, Cliff Sarcona, and Julio Tavarez.

As Tall as Lions track listing
No.	Title	Length
1.	"Stab City"	3:36
2.	"Song for Luna"	3:44
3.	"A Break, a Pause"	3:40
4.	"Love, Love, Love (Love, Love)"	4:33
5.	"Ghost of York"	4:06
6.	"Milk and Honey"	4:34
7.	"Be Here Now"	3:57
8.	"I'm Kicking Myself"	3:03
9.	"Where Do I Stand?"	3:39
10.	"Maybe I'm Just Tired"	10:30
Total length:		45:22

The tenth and final song of the album, "Maybe I'm Just Tired", ends at 4:20. The hidden track "A Soft Hum" begins at 6:33.
