= A New Hope (Vanna album) =

Studio album by Vanna
- Released: March 24, 2009
- Recorded: July 14 – August 24, 2008
- Genre: Post-hardcore, metalcore, melodic hardcore
- Length: 44:05
- Label: Epitaph
- Producer: Steve Evetts

Vanna chronology
Curses (2007)	A New Hope (2009)	The Honest Hearts EP (2010)

Professional ratings
Review scores
Source	Rating
AbsolutePunk.net	60% link
Alt Press	link
Exclaim	positive
PopMatters	4/5

A New Hope is the second studio album by American post-hardcore band Vanna. The album was released on March 24, 2009, through Epitaph Records. A video was made for the song "Safe To Say."

== Track listing ==
No.	Title	Length
1.	"Let’s Have An Earthquake!"	1:23
2.	"Into Hell’s Mouth We March"	3:04
3.	"The Same Graceful Wind"	4:05
4.	"Like Changing Seasons"	4:03
5.	"Trashmouth"	2:32
6.	"Safe to Say"	4:07
7.	"We Are Nameless"	4:06
8.	"Sleepwalker"	4:09
9.	"Where We Are Now"	4:12
10.	"Ten Arms"	4:04
11.	"Life & Limb"	4:05
12.	"The Sun Sets Here"	4:14
Total length:		44:04

== Personnel ==
Vanna

- Chris Preece – unclean vocals
- Nick Lambert – rhythm guitar, backing vocals
- Evan Pharmakis – lead guitar, clean vocals, keyboard, programming, lead vocals Track 9
- Shawn Marquis – bass, backing vocals
- Chris Campbell – drums, percussion

Production

- Steve Evetts – production
- Alan Douches – mixing
