= You Can't Take It with You (album) =

2009 studio album by As Tall as Lions

Studio album by As Tall as Lions
- Released: August 18, 2009
- Recorded: January–March 2009
- Genre: Indie rock
- Length: 50:59
- Label: Triple Crown
- Producers: As Tall as Lions and Noah Shain

As Tall as Lions chronology
Into the Flood (2007)	You Can't Take It with You (2009)	The Circles (2009)

Professional ratings
Review scores
Source	Rating
AllMusic	3.5/5 stars
Blare Magazine	3.5/5 stars
Pitchfork	4.4/10

You Can't Take It with You is the third and final studio album by Long Island-based rock band As Tall as Lions. It was released on August 18, 2009. The album peaked at number 88 on the Billboard 200.

== History ==
As Tall as Lions began working on the album in January 2008. By August 2008, they had 12 songs written. As of November 2008, the band was ready to start recording in the studio.

The single "Circles" was posted on the band's MySpace page on June 18, 2009 for streaming. On July 22, "In Case of Rapture" was released for streaming on AbsolutePunk.net as part of an ABSOLUTExclusive on the band.

On August 13, 2009, the entire album was available for streaming on the band's MySpace page. The album was officially released on August 18; that day, it appeared on the iTunes Top 40.

== Track listing ==
1. "Circles" – 4:18
2. "Sixes & Sevens" – 2:52
3. "You Can't Take It with You" – 4:28
4. "Go Easy" – 4:49
5. "Duermete" – 8:19
6. "In Case of Rapture" – 5:03
7. "We's Been Waitin'" – 3:42
8. "Is This Tomorrow?" – 3:54
9. "Sleepyhead" – 3:14
10. "The Narrows" – 4:25
11. "Lost My Mind" – 6:14

- (track 11 includes hidden bonus song "Asleep in the Sea" featuring Kimbra on vocals)

=== Limited edition ===
The limited edition includes a DVD (featuring making-of material and live footage) and three extra bonus tracks:

12. "Home Is Where You're Happy" – 1:54
13. "That's What You Get" – 2:39
14. "Sleepyhead" (acoustic version) – 3:15

=== Deluxe edition ===
The deluxe edition features the same bonus tracks as the limited edition, as well as the DVD. It also includes an exclusive EP of instrumental songs.

==== Instrumental EP ====
1. "Drummy"
2. "I Thought I Knew You"
3. "Spector"
4. "Persian Lullaby"

=== iTunes bonus track version ===
The iTunes bonus track version has four bonus tracks:

12. "Sleepyhead" (acoustic version)
13. "The Sweet Hereafter"
14. "Where the Green Grass Grows"
15. "Home Is Where You're Happy"
