= Vanna (band) =

American hardcore punk band

- Also known as: Inspirit (2020–2025)
- Origin: Boston, Massachusetts, U.S.
- Genres: Post-hardcore; metalcore; melodic hardcore
- Years active: 2004–2017, 2025–present
- Labels: Epitaph; Artery; Pure Noise
- Members: Chris Preece; Evan Pharmakis; Nicholas Lambert; Brandon Davis; Shawn Marquis
- Past members: Joe Bragel; Davey Muise; Seamus Menihane; Joel Pastuszak; Chris Campbell; Eric Gross

Vanna is an American hardcore punk band from Boston that was formed in 2004. Their sound has been described as furious and cathartic, changing over time from metalcore to post-hardcore, with some songs showing emo or melodic metalcore elements. They originally disbanded in 2017 but later reformed with the original five members in February 2025.

== History ==
=== Early years (2004–2005) ===
The band formed in December 2004 by guitarists Nicholas Lambert and Evan Pharmakis. The duo recorded their first demo in Lambert's dorm room at MassArt, using the program Reason for drums. Soon after, they recruited drummer Brandon Davis (who at the time was playing guitar for the band Therefore I Am), bassist Shawn Marquis, and vocalist Joe Bragel, they originally wanted Chris Preece to be the frontman but he was living in Texas at the time, and they jammed with him a few times but Bragel filled in and was doing well with the band so they decided to keep him. They then recorded and self-released their first EP entitled This Will Be Our Little Secret. The five song EP helped the band gain a strong local fan base. It was this EP that got them noticed to the record companies, and on November 15, 2005, the band was signed to Epitaph Records.

=== Epitaph Records (2005–2009) ===
In March 2006 they released a split 7-inch vinyl with Therefore I Am, of which only 500 hand numbered copies were pressed (100 pink colored vinyl, 100 blue and 300 white). They then began recording their third EP and first release with Epitaph Records, The Search Party Never Came in February 2006. During the recording process, Vanna decided to part ways with original vocalist Joe Bragel. Nick Lambert filled in and took over on vocals for the recording of that album. After the release of the record in June 2006, they recruited Chris Preece as vocalist.

The band toured the second half of 2006, and on October 25, 2006, they traveled to Seattle, Washington to record their first full-length album with producer Matt Bayles (Mastodon, Norma Jean, the Fall of Troy, Pearl Jam). They recorded until December 19, 2006. In February 2007 the band began touring again with the Esoteric and played a few dates on the 2007 Epitaph Tour. Their first full-length debut album, Curses was released on April 24, 2007.

On February 15, 2008, drummer Brandon Davis played his last show as a member of Vanna and parted ways with the band during a tour with Knives Exchanging Hands and My Hero Is Me. The band finished up the tour with Ryan Seaman on drums. As the band began writing their second full-length, they recruited Chris Campbell as full-time drummer. Campbell joined Vanna from the New Hampshire-based band the Jonah Veil, who were disbanding. Campbell's first concert with Vanna was at The Living Room in Providence, Rhode Island, on March 22, 2008.

Vanna's next album titled A New Hope was released on March 24, 2009. A New Hope reached No. 31 on the Billboard Heatseekers chart. AllMusic described the first track as a "stuttering hardcore breakdown blast" setting the tone for the rest of the album's "uplift and crushing heaviness"; something that screamo bands had been trying to accomplish.

In July 2009, vocalist Chris Preece left the band on good terms, citing "personal reasons". Following the band's summer 2009 tour with A Static Lullaby, Preece was replaced by Davey Muise of Seeker Destroyer. Preece played his last show with Vanna at the Mansfield, Massachusetts, stop of the 2009 Warped Tour where Muise was brought to the stage and introduced. Muise played his first official show with Vanna on Saturday July 25, 2009, at the Palladium in Worcester, Massachusetts.

=== Artery Recordings and departure of Evan Pharmakis (2010–2013) ===
Epitaph dropped the band from their roster, so in August 2010, Vanna announced their signing to Artery Recordings. Their debut release through the label was an EP titled The Honest Hearts with producer Jay Maas, released on October 12, 2010. Vanna released the single "Passerby" from the EP and a rerecording of "Trashmouth" as well as "Dead Language For A Dying Lady" with Davey Muise. On January 2, 2011, the band confirmed that they were going to Glow in the Dark Studios to record the new full-length album titled And They Came Baring Bones with producer Matt Goldman. The album was released on June 21, 2011. AllMusic described the album as a continuation of previous work, with some familiar melodic metalcore-style songs, and much the same singing from Muise as had been heard from Preece. The band still delivered vocals that were alternately "Cookie Monster rough and emo clean", with lead vocals coming from guitarist Pharmakis on some songs.

On February 2, 2012, the band announced that founding member guitarist/vocalist Evan Pharmakis and drummer Chris Campbell had quit the band due to family and financial issues. Pharmakis formed a solo project, Wind in Sails. The band also announced on the same day that they recruited guitarist Joel Pastuszak to the band's lineup. Vanna was featured on the Warped Tour 2012.

After touring with several fill-in drummers, Vanna settled on drummer Eric Gross to record next album, again with producer Jay Maas. On March 19, 2013, the band released their new full-length record, The Few and the Far Between, touring in support of the release through 2013 and into 2014. The band promoted and supported the album by uploading video clips through their YouTube account from August to October 2013.

In November 2013, the band recorded a couple of new songs and announced that they would be self-releasing a 7-inch titled Preying/Purging on December 17.

=== Pure Noise Records and disbandment (2014–2017) ===
In February 2014, the band announced they had signed with Pure Noise Records and that they would play on the 2014 Vans Warped Tour. Vanna started recording a new album with producer Will Putney (Like Moths to Flames, Texas in July, Stray from the Path).

On April 18, 2014, the band announced that their fifth album would be titled Void, and would be released on June 16, 2014, through Pure Noise Records. The band's style had changed from screamo to metalcore, supported by Patuszak's clean vocals and Muise's screaming vocals. AllMusic described the band as a "punk-metal hybrid", delivering an album that was "furious, punishing, and relentlessly hateful..." In August it was announced that the band, along with bands Sirens & Sailors, Sylar and Alive Like Me, would be supporting Beartooth on their first North America tour throughout October.

On October 2, 2015, they released an EP titled ALT, consisting of five cover songs.

On May 19, 2016, Vanna released a video for the first single off their new LP, All Hell, titled Pretty Grim, while additionally announcing that All Hell would be released July 8, 2016. Two more singles were released: "Mutter" on June 9, 2016, and "Leather Feather" on June 23. AllMusic reviewed All Hell, calling Vanna a "post-hardcore unit" delivering an album full of cathartic fury.

On April 28, 2017, the band confirmed dates of a tour titled 'All Good Things Must Come To An End' as "a farewell with our friends", confirming their forthcoming plans to part ways. Pastuszak elected to not participate in the band's final shows. In Summer 2017, the band announced their farewell performance with support from Eighteen Visions, Knocked Loose, Bad Rabbits (later to be replaced by END), On Broken Wings, Like Pacific, Kublai Khan, Lions Lions, Old Wounds, Sharptooth, and Roseview. The final Vanna show took place December 15, 2017, at the Worcester Palladium in Worcester, Massachusetts. Past members of Vanna Joe Bragel, Evan Pharmakis, Chris Preece, Brandon Davis and Eric Gross all took part in the concert.

=== INSPIRIT and reformation (2020–present) ===
On October 1, 2020, Nicholas Lambert announced via Reddit and Instagram that five of the original members Nicholas, Brandon, Shawn, Evan, and Chris had come back together to form a new band under the name INSPIRIT. When asked about the direction of the band Lambert stated, "we wanted to do something that fit into that sound we were doing back in 2006, but just done smarter and with better production."

On February 28, 2025, the members of Inspirit announced they would be performing as Vanna again, stating "...INSPIRIT was a fun throwback chapter, it was always part of the same story. Now, we’re continuing that story under the name it started with: Vanna." via Instagram

On August 7, 2026 the band released a re-recording of the EP The Search Party Never Came entitled Search Party.

== Band members ==
Current

- Chris Preece – unclean vocals (2005, 2006–2009, 2017 live shows only, 2025–present)
- Evan Pharmakis – guitar, clean vocals (2004–2012, 2025–present)
- Nicholas Lambert – guitar, piano/keys, backing vocals (2004–2017, 2025–present)
- Brandon Davis – drums (2005–2008, 2025–present)
- Shawn Marquis – bass, backing vocals (2005–2017, 2025–present)

Touring

- Casey Aylward – guitar, vocals (2017)

Former

- Joe Bragel – unclean vocals (2005–2006, 2017 (live shows only)
- Joel Pastuszak – guitar, programming, keyboards, vocals (2012–2017)
- Chris Campbell – drums (2008–2012)
- Eric Gross – drums (2012–2015)
- Davey Muise – lead vocals (2009–2017)
- Seamus Menihane – drums, percussion (2015–2017)

Timeline

== Discography ==
=== Studio albums ===
Release date	Title	Record label	Billboard charts
April 24, 2007	Curses	Epitaph Records	
March 21, 2009	A New Hope	Epitaph Records	#31 (Heatseekers)
June 21, 2011	And They Came Baring Bones	Artery Recordings	#42 (Independent), #22 (Hard Rock) & #8 (Heatseekers)
March 19, 2013	The Few and the Far Between	Artery Recordings	#39 (Independent), #16 (Hard Rock) & #12 (Heatseekers)
June 17, 2014	Void	Pure Noise Records	#157 (Top 200)
July 8, 2016	All Hell	Pure Noise Records	#2 (Heatseekers)

=== EPs ===
Release date	Title	Record label	Billboard chart
2005	Demo	Self-released	
August 2005	This Will Be Our Little Secret	Self-released	
March 10, 2006	Therefore I Am / Vanna	Robotica Records	
June 6, 2006	The Search Party Never Came	Epitaph Records	
October 12, 2010	The Honest Hearts	Artery Recordings	#18 (Heatseekers)
December 17, 2013	Preying/Purging	Self-released	
October 2, 2015	ALT	Pure Noise Records	
September 19, 2025	Time Is Violence	Inspirits Records	
August 7, 2026	Search Party	Inspirits Records	

=== Compilation albums featured on ===
Release date	Title	Track title	Record label
Winter 2006	Epitaph Sampler	"That Champagne Feeling" (Demo)	Epitaph Records
Winter 2006 (Europe)	Epitaph Sampler	"A Dead Language for a Dying Lady"	Hellcat Records
June 6, 2006	Warped Tour 2006 Compilation (Disc 2)	"A Dead Language for a Dying Lady"	Epitaph Records & SideOneDummy Records
June 6, 2006	Unsound Volume 1	"I Am the Wind"	Epitaph Records
June 20, 2006	Purevolume Epitaph Digital Summer Sampler	"The Search Party Never Came"	Epitaph Records
Summer 2006	Epitaph Sampler	"The Search Party Never Came"	Epitaph Records
Summer 2006	Best Buy 'The Noise of Summer' Sampler	"The Search Party Never Came"	Epitaph Records & Alternative Distribution Alliance
December 2006	Purevolume 'Epitaph Tour 2007' Digital Sampler	"The Things He Carried"	Epitaph Records
Winter 2007	Epitaph Sampler	"Country Boys...Goddamn"	Epitaph Records
Spring 2007	Epitaph Sampler	"The Things He Carried"	Epitaph Records
March 23, 2007	Hails & Horns Volume 3 Sampler	"The Things He Carried"	Epitaph Records
June 5, 2007	Warped Tour Compilation (Disc 2)	"The Things He Carried"	Epitaph Records & SideOneDummy Records
Summer 2007	Epitaph Sampler	"The Alarm"	Epitaph Records
October 2007	Purevolume & Epitaph Halloween Digital Sampler	"We Ate the Horse You Rode in On"	Epitaph Records
June 9, 2009	Warped Tour 2009 Tour Compilation (Disc 2)	"Into Hell's Mouth We March"	Epitaph Records & SideOneDummy Records
February 20, 2012	One H.E.L.L. of a Compilation (Side D)	"Every Bridge"	Get Stoked! Records
June 5, 2012	Warped Tour 2012 Tour Compilation (Disc 2)	"I, the Remover"	Epitaph Records & SideOneDummy Records
