= As Tall as Lions =

American rock band

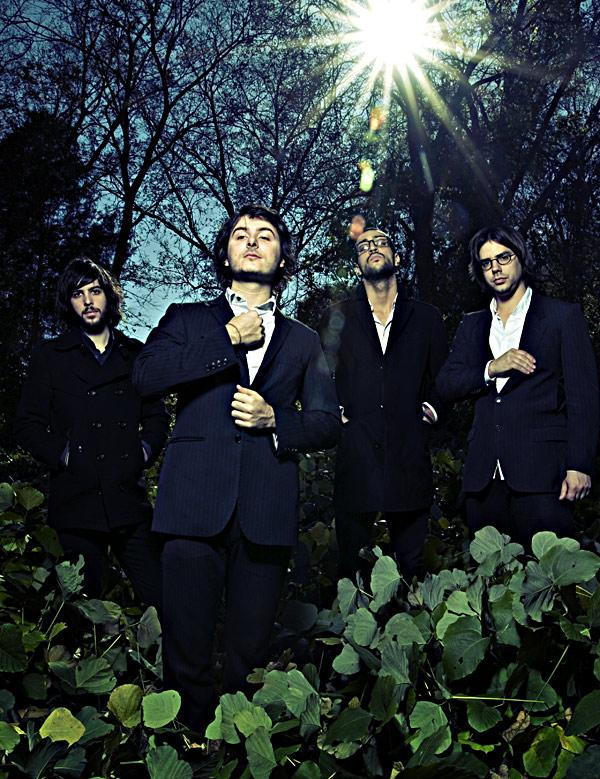

Background information
- Origin: Massapequa, New York, U.S.
- Genres: Indie rock; emo; alternative rock
- Years active: 2001–2010; 2015
- Label: Triple Crown
- Past members: Dan Nigro; Saen Fitzgerald; Cliff Sarcona; Brian Fortune; Brian Caesar; Julio Tavarez
- Website: www.astallaslions.com

As Tall as Lions were an indie rock band from the hamlet of Massapequa on Long Island, New York, formed in 2001.

The band's 2009 album You Can't Take It with You peaked at number 88 on the Billboard 200 chart. Dan Nigro, the lead vocalist of the band, became a prominent record producer and songwriter following the breakup of the band, being nominated for 16 Grammy Awards and winning two.

== History ==
High school friends Dan Nigro (lead vocals & guitars), Saen Fitzgerald (guitar, keyboards, & percussion), Brian Fortune (guitars & keyboards) and Cliff Sarcona (drums & percussion) founded the band in December 2001 as they were looking to continue the momentum of a previous project, a group called SundazE. Nigro and Fitzgerald came from Massapequa, while Sarcona was based in Smithtown.

=== Blood and Aphorisms ===
Blood and Aphorisms was released in July 2002, at local venue Backstreet Blues. Upon its release, vocalist Dan Nigro sent the EP to some websites, which caught the attention of then-influential "thescout.net". The EP garnered the band local radio airplay and the attention of the local music scene. Without a permanent live bassist however, the band used studio engineer Rich Leigey, who had worked on the EP, and friend Julio Tavarez, before Dan Nigro began auditioning and recruiting bassists. It wasn't until October 2002 that the band brought on board bassist Brian Caesar. A few months later, the band signed a joint development deal with Island Records and Triple Crown Records. After their signing, the members of the band dropped out of college to focus on the band full time.

=== Lafcadio ===
In May 2003, the band relocated to Chicago, Illinois, to record their debut album Lafcadio with Sean O'Keefe. Asked to re-release the EP by the label, the band re-recorded tracks from Blood and Aphorisms and wrote new songs.

At the end of October 2003, Nigro, Sarcona, and Caesar went back to Chicago's Gravity Studios using family money and successfully remixed and re-tracked the final three songs. Later the band returned to O'Keefe on several occasions to record the songs "33" and "Mellon Collie..." for an unreleased Smashing Pumpkins tribute album, the song "Children in Bloom" for the Counting Crows compilation album Dead and Dreaming and the song "Girl of the North Country" for a Bob Dylan tribute album.

=== Touring ===
While three of the band members were in Chicago with the full support of their parents, guitarist Brian Fortune had enrolled at St. John's University and withdrew from the band. After months of auditioning guitar players with little luck, the band agreed to move vocalist Dan Nigro to guitar. The band set out on numerous tours in support of Lafcadio and while they admit they were "young and having fun", they were losing money daily. In July 2004, bassist Brian Caesar left the band citing a desire to lead an ordinary life.

=== As Tall as Lions (album) ===
The band came home from tour and wrote the songs "Stab City" and "Where Do I Stand". Soon after, As Tall as Lions wrote "Love, Love, Love (Love, Love)", "Maybe I'm Just Tired" and others. They continued recording through the fall, finishing the mixes in January 2006. Incredibly proud of the record, but the label wrote the songs off as "soft" with no radio singles. The band finished mixing and set out on tour asking friend, Rob Parr, to join the band on tour as keyboardist. Having never played piano, Parr joked that he "fit in just fine", but in reality worked hard and was soon touring with the band.

On August 8, 2006, the band released their self-titled album As Tall as Lions. In October, they set out on tour to promote the new album. The band inked a spot on the AP Tour in March of that year and remained on that bill through April, headlining in June and July. On July 17, they made their television debut on Jimmy Kimmel Live!.

=== Into the Flood and You Can't Take It with You ===
Reformulating previous ideas, As Tall as Lions began writing what would become the EP Into the Flood. On November 27, the band released the EP to iTunes, charting the Top 50 the first week of release. During its release, drummer Sarcona and bassist Tavarez went on a national tour with the Dear Hunter. An As Tall as Lions tour with Silverchair followed in December. The EP was released on vinyl on March 17. In January 2008, the band began work on their new record, You Can't Take It with You, which released on August 18, 2009.

=== Breakup and individual projects ===
On September 29, 2010, the band announced that they were amicably splitting up. Upon announcing the news, their last shows sold out and more were added to the schedule. They immediately planned their "reunion", which was performed in 2015 without new music.

Fitzgerald became the drummer for the band Willis Work, while Parr joined the Dear Hunter as a guitarist and backing vocalist. Fitzgerald, Tavarez, and Sarcona also formed the experimental instrumental band Kilimanjaro, with Tavarez and Sarcona additionally creating a side project called The Black and The White. Nigro moved to Los Angeles and initially worked as a jingle writer for McDonald's, though he later experienced widespread success as a songwriter and producer for artists such as Kylie Minogue, Chappell Roan, and Olivia Rodrigo, receiving a total of 16 Grammy nominations and being named Songwriter of the Year at the 2024 ASCAP Pop Music Awards.

== Musical style and influences ==
As Tall as Lions' musical style has been described as emo, indie rock, and indie pop.

While influences vary among members, the band has cited the Beatles, Led Zeppelin, Radiohead, Jeff Buckley, and Coldplay as musical influences.

== Former members ==
- Dan Nigro – lead vocals, guitars (2001–2010; 2015)
- Saen Fitzgerald – guitars, keyboards, percussion (2001–2010; 2015)
- Cliff Sarcona – drums, percussion (2001–2010; 2015)
- Brian Fortune – guitars, keyboards (2001–2005)
- Brian Caesar – bass guitar, keyboards (2002–2004)
- Julio Tavarez – bass guitar, keyboards (2004–2010; 2015)

== Discography ==
=== Albums ===
Title	Release date	Label	Billboard 200 peak position
Lafcadio	May 18, 2004	Triple Crown	—
As Tall as Lions	August 8, 2006	Triple Crown	—
You Can't Take It with You	August 18, 2009	Triple Crown	88

=== EPs ===
Title	Release date	Label
Blood and Aphorisms	September 2002	Self-released
Into the Flood	November 27, 2007	East West / TCR
The Circles	December 7, 2009	Triple Crown

=== DVD ===
- A Farewell Documentary (live in Chicago and New York plus B-side) (2013)
