= List of radio stations in New Hampshire =

The following is a list of FCC-licensed radio stations in the U.S. state of New Hampshire, which can be sorted by their call signs, frequencies, cities of license, licensees, and programming formats.

== List of radio stations ==
Call sign	Frequency	City of License	Licensee	Format
WAKC	102.3 FM	Concord	Educational Media Foundation	Contemporary Christian
WANH	88.3 FM	Meredith	New Hampshire Gospel Radio, Inc.	Religious
WASR	1420 AM	Wolfeboro	Winnipesaukee Radio Station, LLC	Country
WBNC	1340 AM	Conway	Mt. Washington Radio & Gramophone, L.L.C.	Soft adult contemporary
WBNH-LP	105.1 FM	Bedford	Town of Bedford, New Hampshire	Alternative Rock
WBUB-LP	96.1 FM	Portsmouth	Cultural Media Connection	Contemporary Christian
WBYY	98.7 FM	Somersworth	WBIN Media Co., Inc.	Classic hits (simulcast WFNQ)
WCGY-FM	97.3 FM	Jefferson	Lakes Media, LLC	Country
WCNH	90.5 FM	Concord	New Hampshire Public Radio, Incorporated	Classical
WCNL	1010 AM	Newport	Sugar River Media, LLC	Country
WDER	1320 AM	Derry	Blount Communications, Inc. of NH	Christian
WDER-FM	92.1 FM	Peterborough	Blount Communications, Inc. of NH	Christian
WDMN-LP	94.9 FM	Manchester	Portuguese Radio Foundation Corporation	Spanish Hits
WEEY	93.5 FM	Swanzey	Great Eastern Radio, LLC	Country
WEMJ	1490 AM	Laconia	WBIN Media Co., Inc.	News/Talk
WERZ	107.1 FM	Exeter	iHM Licenses, LLC	Top 40/CHR
WEVC	107.1 FM	Gorham	New Hampshire Public Radio, Incorporated	Public radio
WEVF	90.3 FM	Colebrook	New Hampshire Public Radio, Incorporated	Public radio
WEVH	91.3 FM	Hanover	New Hampshire Public Radio, Incorporated	Public radio
WEVJ	99.5 FM	Jackson	New Hampshire Public Radio, Incorporated	Public radio
WEVN	90.7 FM	Keene	New Hampshire Public Radio, Incorporated	Public radio
WEVO	89.1 FM	Concord	New Hampshire Public Radio, Incorporated	Public radio
WEVQ	91.9 FM	Littleton	New Hampshire Public Radio, Incorporated	Public radio
WEVS	88.3 FM	Nashua	New Hampshire Public Radio, Incorporated	Public radio
WEVX-LP	95.1 FM	Derry	Town of Derry, New Hampshire	Variety
WFEA	1370 AM	Manchester	Saga Communications of New England, LLC	Talk
WFNQ	106.3 FM	Nashua	WBIN Media Co., Inc.	Classic hits
WFPC-LP	105.3 FM	Rindge	Franklin Pierce College	Variety
WFRD	99.3 FM	Hanover	Trustees of Dartmouth College	Mainstream rock
WFTN	1240 AM	Franklin	Northeast Communications Corporation	Oldies
WFTN-FM	94.1 FM	Franklin	Northeast Communications Corporation	Contemporary hit radio
WFYX	96.3 FM	Walpole	Great Eastern Radio, LLC	Country
WGAM	1250 AM	Manchester	Absolute Broadcasting, LLC	Oldies
WGGG-LP	102.3 FM	Ossipee	Ossipee Public Media, Inc.	Variety
WGHM	900 AM	Nashua	Absolute Broadcasting, LLC	Oldies
WGIR	610 AM	Manchester	iHM Licenses, LLC	News/Talk
WGIR-FM	101.1 FM	Manchester	iHM Licenses, LLC	Mainstream rock
WGXL	92.3 FM	Hanover	Great Eastern Radio, LLC	Top 40/CHR
WHDQ	106.1 FM	Claremont	Great Eastern Radio, LLC	Classic rock
WHEB	100.3 FM	Portsmouth	iHM Licenses, LLC	Mainstream rock
WHNM	1350 AM	Laconia	Costa-Eagle Radio Ventures Limited Partnership	Classic hits
WHOM	94.9 FM	Mount Washington	Townsquare License, LLC	Adult contemporary
WICX-LP	102.7 FM	Concord	New Hampshire Catholic Community Radio	Catholic
WINQ-FM	98.7 FM	Winchester	Saga Communications of New England, LLC	Country
WJNH	91.1 FM	Conway	New Hampshire Gospel Radio, Inc.	Christian
WJYY	105.5 FM	Concord	WBIN Media Co., Inc.	Top 40/CHR
WKBK	1290 AM	Keene	Saga Communications of New England, LLC	News/Talk
WKDR	1490 AM	Berlin	White Mountains Broadcasting, LLC	Classic hits/Classic rock
WKNE	103.7 FM	Keene	Saga Communications of New England, LLC	Hot AC
WKNH	91.3 FM	Keene	Keene State College	College
WKXL	1450 AM	Concord	New Hampshire Family Radio LLC	News Talk Information
WLKC	105.7 FM	Campton	Educational Media Foundation	Contemporary Christian
WLKZ	104.9 FM	Wolfeboro	Lakes Media, LLC	Classic rock
WLLO-LP	102.9 FM	Londonderry	Londonderry School District, School Administrative Unit 12	Variety
WLMW	90.7 FM	Manchester	Knowledge For Life	Religious Talk (AFR)
WLNH-FM	98.3 FM	Laconia	WBIN Media Co., Inc.	Classic hits (simulcast WFNQ)
WLTN	1400 AM	Littleton	Profile Broadcasting, LLC	Oldies
WLTN-FM	96.7 FM	Lisbon	Profile Broadcasting, LLC	Adult contemporary
WLWM-LP	105.7 FM	Charlestown	The Living Word Ministries of Charlestown, NH	Christian
WMEX-LP	105.9 FM	Rochester	Rochester Radio	Oldies
WMLL	96.5 FM	Bedford	Saga Communications of New England, LLC	Country
WMNH-LP	95.3 FM	Manchester	Manchester Public Television Service	Variety
WMOU	1230 AM	Berlin	Radiotron, LLC	Top 40/CHR
WMTK	106.3 FM	Littleton	Vermont Broadcast Associates, Inc.	Classic rock
WMVX	1110 AM	Salem	Costa-Eagle Radio Ventures Limited Partnership	Spanish talk
WMWV	93.5 FM	Conway	Mt. Washington Radio & Gramophone, L.L.C.	Adult Album Alternative
WNEC-FM	91.7 FM	Henniker	New England College	College
WNHI	106.5 FM	Farmington	Educational Media Foundation	Christian Worship (Air1)
WNHN-LP	94.7 FM	Concord	NH News, Views, and Blues	Variety
WNHW	93.3 FM	Belmont	WBIN Media Co., Inc.	Country
WNHZ-LP	103.1 FM	Littleton	Radio America Media, Corp.	Easy listening
WNNH	99.1 FM	Henniker	WBIN Media Co., Inc.	Active rock
WNTK-FM	99.7 FM	New London	Sugar River Media, LLC	News/Talk
WOKQ	97.5 FM	Dover	Townsquare License, LLC	Country
WOXX	97.1 FM	Colebrook	White Mountains Broadcasting LLC	Classic hits/Classic rock
WPCR-FM	91.7 FM	Plymouth	Plymouth State University	College
WPEA	90.5 FM	Exeter	Trustees of the Phillips Exeter Academy	Variety
WPKC	1540 AM	Exeter	Educational Media Foundation	Contemporary Christian (K-Love)
WPKQ	103.7 FM	North Conway	Townsquare License, LLC	Alternative rock
WPKX	930 AM	Rochester	iHM Licenses, LLC	Sports (FSR)
WPNH	1300 AM	Plymouth	Northeast Communications Corporation	Oldies
WPNH-FM	100.1 FM	Plymouth	Northeast Communications Corporation	Active rock
WQSO	96.7 FM	Rochester	iHM Licenses, LLC	Talk
WSAK	102.1 FM	Hampton	Townsquare License, LLC	Classic hits
WSCA-LP	106.1 FM	Portsmouth	Seacoasts Arts And Cultural Alliance	Variety
WSCS	90.9 FM	New London	Sugar River Foundation, Inc.	Classical
WSCY	106.9 FM	Moultonborough	Northeast Communications Corporation	New Country
WSMN	1590 AM	Nashua	Bartis Broadcasting, LLC	News/Talk
WSNI	97.7 FM	Swanzey	Saga Communications of New England, LLC	Adult contemporary
WSSH	89.7 FM	Lisbon	Nostalgia One Public Radio, Inc.	Unknown
WTPL	107.7 FM	Hillsborough	WBIN Media Co., Inc.	News/Talk
WTSN	1270 AM	Dover	WBIN Media Co, Inc.	News/Talk
WTSV	1230 AM	Claremont	Great Eastern Radio, LLC	Sports (ESPN)
WUMV	88.7 FM	Milford	University of Massachusetts	Americana/Roots/Blues/Folk
WUNH	91.3 FM	Durham	University of New Hampshire	Variety
WUVR	1490 AM	Lebanon	Sugar River Media, LLC	News/Talk (simulcast WNTK-FM)
WVFA	90.5 FM	Lebanon	Green Mountain Educational Fellowship, Inc	Contemporary Inspirational
WVKJ	89.9 FM	Dublin	The Kingdom Christian Ministries	Religious
WVMJ	104.5 FM	Conway	Mt. Washington Radio & Gramophone, L.L.C.	Adult Top 40-CHR
WVNH	91.1 FM	Concord	New Hampshire Gospel Radio, Inc.	Religious
WWLK-FM	101.5 FM	Meredith	Lakes Media, LLC	Soft adult contemporary
WWPC	91.7 FM	New Durham	Word Radio Educational Foundation	Christian
WXGR-LP	103.5 FM	Dover	Seacoast Community Radio	Variety
WWOX	94.1 FM	Milan	White Mountains Broadcasting, LLC	Unknown
WXXK	100.5 FM	Lebanon	Great Eastern Radio, LLC	Country
WXXS	102.3 FM	Lancaster	Radio New England Broadcasting, LLC	Contemporary hit radio
WYDI	90.5 FM	Derry	Horizon Christian Fellowship	Christian
WYKC	99.1 FM	Whitefield	Educational Media Foundation	Contemporary Christian
WYKR-FM	101.3 FM	Haverhill	Puffer Broadcasting, Inc.	Country
WYRY	104.9 FM	Hinsdale	Tri-Valley Broadcasting, LLC	Country
WZBK	1220 AM	Keene	Saga Communications of New England, LLC	Classic hits
WZID	95.7 FM	Manchester	Saga Communications of New England, LLC	Adult contemporary
WZNC-LP	99.9 FM	Bethlehem	Friends of the Colonial	Eclectic Alternative

== Defunct ==
- WCNH - Bow
- WEAQ - Berlin
- WJSK-LP - Bartlett
- WKHP-LP - Keene
- WPVH - Plymouth
- WQNH-LP - Deerfield
- WTSL - Hanover
