= WFTN =

WFTN may refer to:

- WFTN (AM), a radio station (1240 AM) licensed to Franklin, New Hampshire, United States
- WFTN-FM, a radio station (94.1 FM) licensed to Franklin, New Hampshire, United States
