= WWLK =

WWLK may refer to:

- WWLK-FM, a radio station (101.5 FM) licensed to Meredith, New Hampshire, United States
- WWLK (AM), a defunct radio station (900 AM) formerly licensed to Eddyville, Kentucky, United States
