= WPNH =

WPNH may refer to:

- WPNH (AM), a radio station (1300 AM) licensed to Plymouth, New Hampshire, United States
- WPNH-FM, a radio station (100.1 FM) licensed to Plymouth, New Hampshire, United States
