= WLTN =

WLTN may refer to:

- WLTN (AM), a radio station (1400 AM) licensed to Littleton, New Hampshire, United States
- WLTN-FM, a radio station (96.7 FM) licensed to Lisbon, New Hampshire, United States
