= WJYY =

- Concord, New Hampshire; United States
- Broadcast area: Manchester, New Hampshire
- Frequency: 105.5 MHz
- Branding: 105.5 JYY

Programming
- Format: Top 40
- Affiliations: Premiere Networks

Ownership
- Owner: Binnie Media; (WBIN Media Co., Inc.)
- Sister stations: WEMJ; WFNQ; WLNH-FM; WNNH; WNHW; WTPL

History
- First air date: September 15, 1983
- Call sign meaning: Joy

Technical information
- Licensing authority: FCC
- Facility ID: 54909
- Class: A
- ERP: 1,350 watts
- HAAT: 151 meters (495 ft)
- Transmitter coordinates: 43°16′42.3″N 71°30′18.2″W

Links
- Public license information: Public file; LMS
- Webcast: Listen live
- Website: wjyy.com

WJYY (105.5 FM, "105.5 JYY") is a radio station broadcasting a Top 40 format. Licensed to Concord, New Hampshire, United States, the station serves the Concord and Manchester areas. The station is owned by Binnie Media and licensed to WBIN Media Co., Inc.

== History ==
The station was assigned the WJYY call letters by the Federal Communications Commission on January 31, 1983. The station was originally branded as "Joy 105.5 FM". WJYY was also simulcast on a sister station 92.1 WNHQ, which improved its signal in the southern parts of the Manchester metro. This lasted until December 1999, when WNHQ flipped to WFEX, an alternative rock format that simulcast WFNX in Boston, Massachusetts.

WJYY, along with 16 other stations in northern New England formerly owned by Nassau Broadcasting Partners, was purchased at bankruptcy auction by WBIN Media Company, a company controlled by Bill Binnie, on May 22, 2012. Binnie already owned WBIN-TV in Derry and WYCN-LP in Nashua. The deal was completed on November 30, 2012.

In an effort to compete with heritage Lakes Region CHR outlet WFTN-FM, WJYY started to simulcast in the Lakes Region on 1490 WEMJ and its 107.3 translator on May 24, 2019. The simulcast ended on October 26, 2020, with WEMJ switching back to its previous news/talk format.

Around fall 2021, WJYY shifted its format to rhythmic CHR. In January 2023, the format was modified to a rhythmic hot AC format, focusing on rhythmic gold from the late 1990s through the 2010s, with two recent titles per hour.
