= WNHT =

WNHT may refer to:

- WNHT-LD, a low-power television station (channel 4) licensed to serve Birmingham, Alabama, United States
- WNHT (TV), a former CBS affiliate in Concord, New Hampshire, now WPXG (UHF 21)
- WXKE, a radio station (96.3 FM) licensed to Churubusco, Indiana, United States, which held the call sign WNHT from 2002 to 2014
- WXXS, a radio station (102.3 FM) licensed to Lancaster, New Hampshire, United States, which held the call sign WNHT from 1997 to 1998
