= WNHW =

Country music radio station in Belmont, New Hampshire

- Belmont, New Hampshire; United States
- Broadcast area: Concord, New Hampshire; Lakes Region
- Frequency: 93.3 MHz
- Branding: 93.3 the Wolf

Programming
- Format: Country

Ownership
- Owner: Binnie Media; (WBIN Media Co. Inc.)
- Sister stations: WXLF; WEMJ; WJYY; WLNH-FM; WNNH; WTPL

History
- First air date: May 8, 1994
- Former call signs: WNHI (1994–2005)
- Call sign meaning: "New Hampshire's Wolf"

Technical information
- Licensing authority: FCC
- Facility ID: 54908
- Class: A
- ERP: 300 watts
- HAAT: 311 meters (1,020 ft)
- Transmitter coordinates: 43°23′52.2″N 71°33′1.2″W

Links
- Public license information: Public file; LMS
- Webcast: Listen live
- Website: 933thewolf.com

WNHW (93.3 MHz) is a commercial FM radio station broadcasting a country music format. Licensed to Belmont, New Hampshire, it serves the Concord and Lakes Region areas of New Hampshire. The station is owned by Binnie Media and licensed to WBIN Media Co. Inc.

== History ==
The station was assigned the call letters WCNH on September 19, 1989. On March 15, 1994, the station changed its call sign to WNHI; on February 4, 2005, it became WNHW. WNHI, which went on the air May 8, 1994, was originally known as "I-93" (referring to Interstate 93) with a classic rock radio format, which moved to co-owned WWHK/WWHQ in 2005 and is currently heard on WLKZ. Prior to the format swap, the country music format originated on WWHK as WOTX-FM ("Outlaw 102.3").

Its signature voice is John Willyard, voice of the CMA Awards since 1996, whose voice work is heard on many country music stations across North America.

WNHW, along with 16 other stations in northern New England formerly owned by Nassau Broadcasting Partners, was purchased at bankruptcy auction by WBIN Media Company, a company controlled by Bill Binnie, on May 22, 2012. Binnie already owned WBIN-TV in Derry and WYCN-LP in Nashua. The deal was completed on November 30, 2012.
