= WASR =

WASR may refer to:

- WASR (AM), a radio station (1420 AM) licensed to Wolfeboro, New Hampshire, United States
- The ICAO code for Rendani Airport in Manokwari, Indonesia
- WASR-series rifles, a Romanian variant of the Avtomat Kalashnikov series of rifles
