= WEZS =

WEZS is a United States radio call sign that was assigned to various broadcast stations, including:

- WHNM in New Hampshire, which used WEZS from 1994–2023
- WUEZ in Illinois, which used WEZS from 1991–1993
- WURV in Virginia, from 1969–1988
