= WFNQ =

- Nashua, New Hampshire; United States
- Broadcast area: Manchester, New Hampshire
- Frequency: 106.3 MHz (HD Radio)
- Branding: 106.3 Frank FM

Programming
- Format: Classic hits
- Subchannels: HD2: VSiN (Sports gambling)
- Affiliations: New England Patriots Radio Network

Ownership
- Owner: Binnie Media; (WBIN Media Co., Inc.)
- Sister stations: WEMJ; WJYY; WLNH-FM; WNNH; WNHW; WTPL

History
- First air date: October 19, 1987
- Former call signs: WHOB (1987–2005)
- Call sign meaning: "Frank"

Technical information
- Licensing authority: FCC
- Facility ID: 23329
- Class: A
- ERP: 6,000 watts
- HAAT: 81 meters (266 ft)
- Transmitter coordinates: 42°49′36.3″N 71°30′8.2″W

Links
- Public license information: Public file; LMS
- Webcast: Listen live; HD2: Listen live
- Website: frankfmradio.com

WFNQ (106.3 FM; "Frank FM") is a radio station in Nashua, New Hampshire, serving the Manchester area with a classic hits radio format. It is owned by Binnie Media. The station's studios are on Church Street in Concord, and its transmitter is located in Merrimack, just west of the Merrimack Premium Outlets.

WFNQ can also be received in the northern portion of the Boston media market. The station has FM co-channel interference with Providence-market WWKX past this area.

WFNQ is the flagship station of a three-station network under the Frank FM branding. WLNH-FM (98.3) in Laconia (serving the Lakes Region) and WBYY (98.7) in Somersworth (serving the Seacoast Region) share WFNQ's playlist and branding, but have separate commercials. Additionally, WNNH (99.1) in Henniker previously served as a full simulcast of WFNQ for areas north and west of Manchester; it is now an active rock station.

== History ==
The 106.3 allocation in Nashua, New Hampshire, was originally assigned to WOTW-FM, which went on the air in March 1948, lost its license in 1977, and continued operating under an interim operator from 1978 to June 30, 1985. After the revocation of the licenses for WOTW-FM and WOTW (900 AM) and a nine-year licensing process, Gateway Broadcasting Associates was granted authority to build a new FM station in 1986; the AM frequency was separately awarded to Merrimack Valley Broadcasting, who would put WMVU on the air in 1992. Gateway, controlled by Mario DiCarlo, selected the call sign WHOB in reference to the station's honey bee logo, which was intended to symbolize that it would be "an industrious station". Following several delays, WHOB signed on at 6 a.m. on October 19, 1987. In its early years, WHOB primarily focused on the Nashua area, though its signal, originating from a tower in Hudson, reached from Concord to Route 128 in Burlington, Massachusetts.

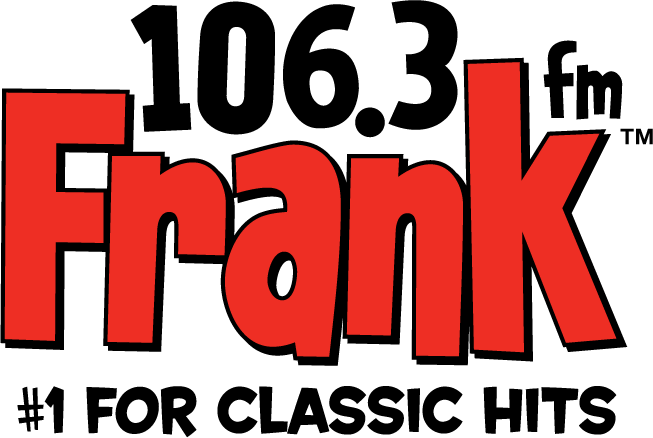
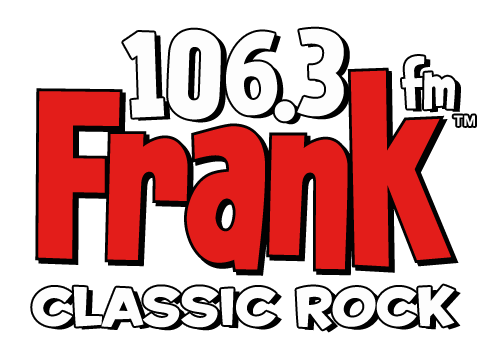
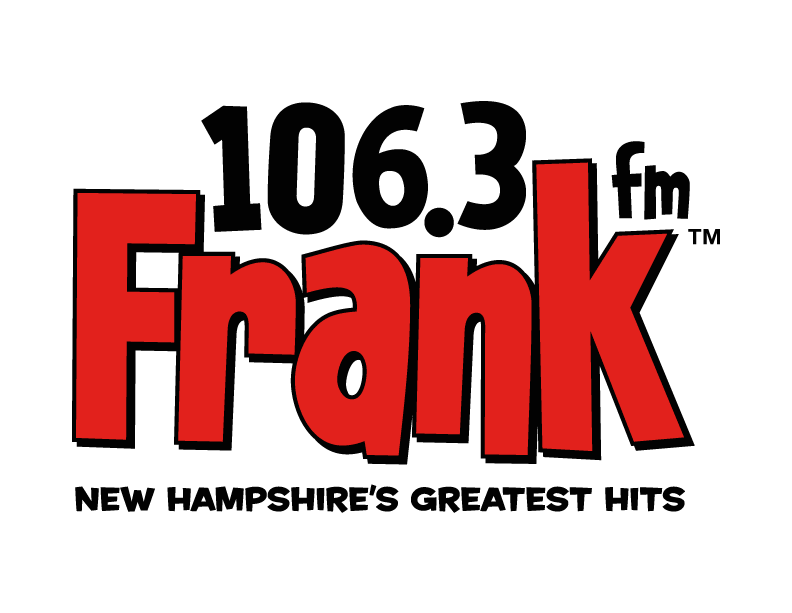
Pre-2021 versions of the "Frank FM" logo; each version reflects the different formats used under this brand.

At one time a contemporary hit radio station, the station began mixing in modern rock in 1996, and had shifted to hot adult contemporary by 1999, when DiCarlo retired and sold WHOB to Tele-Media. Tele-Media sold WHOB, along with WNNH in Henniker and WLKZ in Wolfeboro, to Nassau Broadcasting Partners in 2004. Nassau dropped the hot AC format in favor of the "Frank FM" classic hits format (the second Nassau station, after WFNK in Lewiston, Maine, to do so) and the WFNQ callsign on March 17, 2005.

The station, along with 16 other Nassau stations in northern New England, was purchased at bankruptcy auction by WBIN Media Company, a company controlled by Bill Binnie, on May 22, 2012. Binnie already owned WBIN-TV in Derry and WYCN-LP in Nashua. The deal was completed on November 30, 2012.

On June 1, 2015, WFNQ shifted its format to classic rock. It switched back to classic hits in 2018.

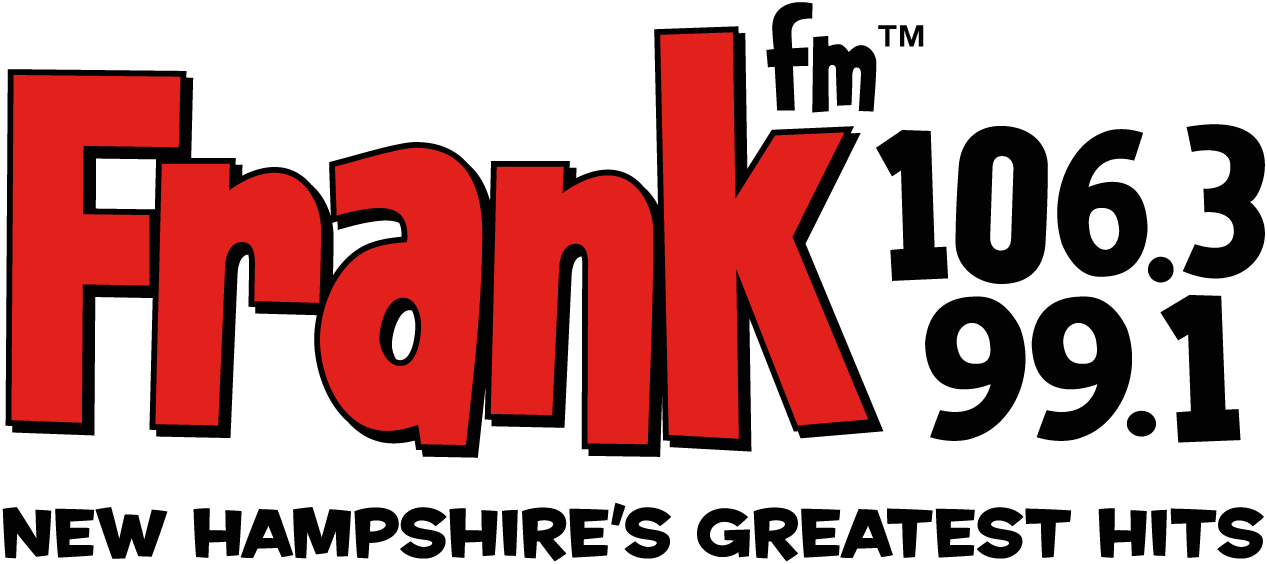
WFNQ's logo from when it was simulcast over WNNH

On April 1, 2019, WNNH in Henniker began simulcasting WFNQ, bringing the station's programming to areas north and west of Manchester, including Concord. On May 24, 2019, WLNH-FM in Laconia and WBYY in Somersworth began carrying WFNQ's programming, but with separate advertising, forming a regional network. The "Frank FM" network transitioned to a hot adult contemporary format during 2021; during this transition, on September 3, 2021, WNNH left the network and launched its own active rock format.

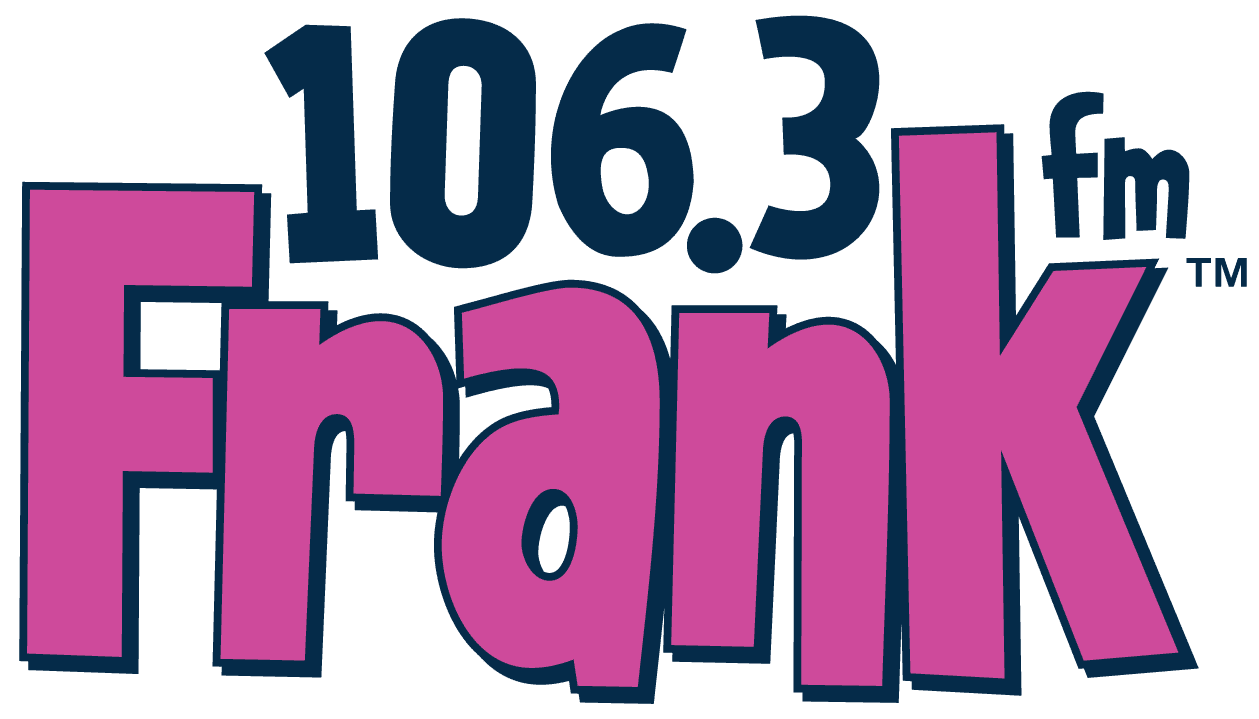
Pink version of the "Frank FM" logo, used under the hot AC format

After morning host Marc Nazzaro (who used the air name "DJ Nazzy") was laid off from "Frank FM" in January 2023 as part of a refocus of Binnie Media's resources on its news and talk programming, vice president of programming Heath Cole told the Concord Monitor that "the music format that we do will change". On February 1, 2023, WFNQ, along with the rest of the "Frank FM" network, again returned to a classic hits format; the stations also dropped their remaining on-air staff, who were reassigned to other positions within the company.

== HD Radio ==
On May 24, 2023, the format of WFNQ's second HD Radio channel was changed from a simulcast of active rock-formatted WNNH to VSiN's sports gambling network.
