= WNNH =

- Henniker, New Hampshire; United States
- Broadcast area: Concord, New Hampshire; Manchester, New Hampshire
- Frequency: 99.1 MHz
- Branding: 99.1 The Bone

Programming
- Format: Active rock
- Affiliations: New England Patriots Radio Network

Ownership
- Owner: Binnie Media; (WBIN Media Co., Inc.)
- Sister stations: WEMJ; WFNQ; WJYY; WLNH-FM; WNHW; WTPL

History
- First air date: October 1989
- Call sign meaning: Ninety-Nine Henniker (city of license)

Technical information
- Licensing authority: FCC
- Facility ID: 11664
- Class: A
- ERP: 2,800 watts
- HAAT: 146 meters (479 ft)
- Transmitter coordinates: 43.214°N 71.688°W

Links
- Public license information: Public file; LMS
- Webcast: Listen live
- Website: 991thebone.com

WNNH (99.1 FM; "99.1 The Bone") is a commercial radio station owned by Binnie Media. WNNH is licensed to Henniker, New Hampshire, and serves the Concord-Manchester area. Its transmitter is on Watchtower Road in Contoocook and its studios and offices are on Church Street in Concord.

WNNH airs an active rock radio format, as part of Binnie Media's "Bone" franchise. The "Bone" branding and format is shared with WHXR (106.3 FM) in Portland, Maine.

== History ==
WNNH first signed on the air in October 1989 from the Pats Peak Ski Area in Henniker, with studios on South Street in Concord. The station's original owner was Clark Smidt, who programmed several Boston FM stations in the 1970s, including WEEI-FM (103.3, now WBGB) and WBZ-FM (106.7, now WMJX). WNNH's original format was oldies. In the early days, the station marketed itself as a Manchester area rimshot, despite being practically inaudible south of the city. At the outset, WNNH had a very slick sound for a small market station, complete with PAMS jingles. The station had a diverse playlist — deeper than most oldies stations.

In 1994, Smidt tried to purchase WJYY (105.5 FM) and its then-satellite station, WRCI (107.7 FM; now WTPL), from Empire Broadcasting Partners, with the idea of putting WNNH on 105.5 to reinforce its signal in Concord. Empire Broadcasting owned a group of radio stations in Upstate New York and Northern New England (including WGY in Schenectady, New York), but had overextended themselves and went bankrupt. The bankruptcy court ruled that Empire Radio Partners could not be reorganized and ordered the stations sold at auction; another company, RadioWorks, was chosen by the court as the winner of the auction.

Smidt sold WNNH to Tele-Media in 1999; Tele-Media, in turn, sold WNNH, WLKZ (104.9 FM), and WHOB (106.3 FM; now WFNQ) to Nassau Broadcasting Partners in 2004. However, even though WLKZ, which Tele-Media had acquired in 2000, also broadcast an oldies format (albeit serving the nearby Lakes Region), the two stations continued to be programmed and branded separately until 2007, when Nassau consolidated the two stations into a simulcast. That December, the stations shifted to a classic hits format, using Nassau's Frank FM brand, as a result of an unsuccessful attempt to convert WWHK (102.3 FM, now WAKC) and WWHQ (101.5 FM, now WWLK-FM) from classic rock to sports radio programming from WEEI.

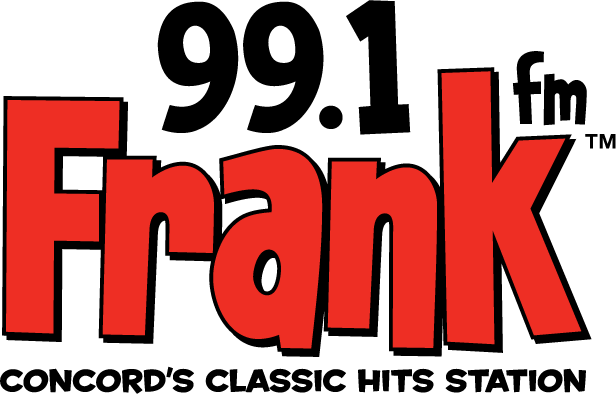
Logo as 99.1 Frank FM, used from November 9, 2012, until August 31, 2015

On April 27, 2009, it was announced that WNNH and WWHQ would be spun off into a divestiture trust and sold as part of a debt-for-equity restructuring of Nassau Broadcasting in which Goldman Sachs became 85% owner of the company. The new ownership structure ended Nassau's grandfathered status with respect to how many stations in the Concord-Lakes Region market it could own. A sale of the two stations to Great Eastern Radio was announced on September 22, 2009. In the interim, Nassau discontinued 99 and 104.9 Frank FM on November 4, and switched WNNH to a simulcast of WJYY for several weeks before converting it to a loop of promotions for other Nassau stations in the Concord-Lakes Region market. The station went silent on March 1, 2010, due to power failure; it returned to the air in March 2011 as a simulcast of the Maine-based WBACH network of classical music stations.

WNNH, along with 16 other Nassau stations in northern New England, was purchased at bankruptcy auction by WBIN Media Company, a company controlled by Bill Binnie, on May 22, 2012. Binnie already owned WBIN-TV in Derry and WYCN-LP in Nashua. The deal was completed on November 30, 2012; a few weeks earlier, on November 9, WNNH dropped the simulcast of WBACH and returned to the classic hits format and Frank FM branding dropped three years earlier.

On August 31, 2015, WNNH switched to "99.1 NH1 News" with local news (including simulcasts of the "NH1"-branded newscasts on WBIN-TV) and syndicated talk shows, including a weekday morning show with Jack Heath provided by WGIR in Manchester, New Hampshire, Boston-based Howie Carr in afternoons, and nationally syndicated shows from Mike Gallagher, Dennis Prager, Michael Savage, Lars Larson, Red Eye Radio and First Light. National news came from CBS Radio News. WNNH carried New England Patriots football.

WNNH returned to an oldies format on August 7, 2017, as an affiliate of Scott Shannon's True Oldies Channel. The format change came after Binnie took control of competing talk radio station WTPL under a local marketing agreement; it also followed the sale of "NH1" flagship station WBIN-TV.

On April 1, 2019, WNNH again reinstated the Frank FM branding and the classic hits format, via a simulcast with sister station WFNQ out of Nashua, New Hampshire. By late 2020, WNNH had become a simulcast of WLNH-FM (98.3).

On September 3, 2021, at 6 am, WNNH split from its simulcast with WLNH and launched an active rock format, branded as "99.1 The Bone".
