= Frank FM =

Branding for radio stations

Frank FM is the branding used by Binnie Media for its radio stations airing a classic hits radio format. The Frank FM format was similar to the Jack FM format in that these stations play around 1000 songs in regular rotation at any time as opposed to the average number of 300 to 600 songs heard regularly on most commercial radio stations. Some Frank FM playlists resemble to classic hits stations rather than that of variety hits stations.

The Frank FM stations are:

- 107.5 WFNK in Lewiston, Maine (serving Portland)
- 106.9 WBQX in Thomaston, Maine (serving Mid Coast Maine)
- 106.3 WFNQ in Nashua, New Hampshire (serving Manchester and Nashua)
- 98.3 WLNH-FM in Laconia, New Hampshire (serving the Lakes Region)
- 98.7 WBYY in Somersworth, New Hampshire (serving the New Hampshire Seacoast Region).

The two Maine-based Frank FM stations have a playlist that leans toward classic rock, while the New Hampshire-based stations include a mix of rock, pop and dance hits in their playlists.

The Frank FM logo and branding are also employed on WRFK in Barre, Vermont, and WWFK in Plattsburgh West, New York, a simulcast on 107.1 FM owned by Great Eastern Radio. WRFK had once played classic hits and still calls itself Frank FM, but now airs a classic rock format, using the slogan "Everything That Rocks." The Frank FM branding is also used on a station on Cape Cod, 93.5 WFRQ in Harwich, Massachusetts. WFRQ was formerly owned by CodComm, Inc., headed by John Garabedian, until it was sold to current owner, Steve Chessare of Coxswain Communications Inc. It was once co-owned with the other Frank FM stations. WFRQ's playlist is similar to the New Hampshire-based Frank FM stations, including past hits from the rock, pop and dance genres. It calls itself "Cape Cod's Greatest Hits."

Most of these stations were owned by Nassau Broadcasting Partners until 2012. At that time, WBIN Media acquired the Frank FM stations in Maine and New Hampshire, WRFK was sold to Great Eastern Radio, and WFRQ was acquired by Codcomm, Inc. WBYY was owned by Garrison City Broadcasting until its 2016 sale to WBIN Media; WWFK was owned by Radioactive, LLC until its sale to Great Eastern Radio in 2021.

During 2021, the three Frank FM stations in New Hampshire shifted from classic hits to a hot adult contemporary format, while retaining the Frank FM branding. The classic hits format remained on the Maine Frank FM stations. On February 1, 2023, the New Hampshire Frank FM stations returned to playing a classic hits format. The New Hampshire stations also dropped their remaining on air staff who were moved to other positions within Binnie Media or otherwise laid off. The Maine Frank FM stations remain separately programmed.

== Former stations ==
In March 2009, WFKB in Boyertown, Pennsylvania (serving Reading), ended the Frank FM format after three years. That station is owned by a Christian broadcaster, WDAC, Inc., but was managed by Nassau Broadcasting from the fall of 2005 to the spring of 2009. Its owner took back the station's programming and reverted to the WBYN-FM call sign and Christian contemporary music, with some preaching and teaching shows. The change occurred due to Nassau's unwillingness to finance a local marketing agreement (LMA) or purchase the station outright for the amount of money that WDAC Inc. wanted.

On April 27, 2009, a corporate reorganization began that required Nassau to divest two stations in central New Hampshire, WWHQ and WNNH. They were transferred to a divestiture trust. This caused the Frank FM simulcast of WNNH in Henniker and WLKZ in Wolfeboro to end on November 4, 2009. WLKZ immediately picked up WWHQ's former classic rock format, while WNNH, after a period of time off-the-air and a subsequent simulcast of Maine-based classical music station WBACH, returned to the classic hits format and Frank FM branding in November 2012. On August 31, 2015, WNNH replaced Frank FM with a talk radio format. That lasted until 2017, when WNNH became an affiliate of Scott Shannon’s True Oldies Channel. On April 1, 2019, WNNH returned to the Frank FM branding and classic hits format, this time simulcasting WFNQ to fill in coverage holes in the northern part of the Manchester market and the Concord area; this simulcast was itself replaced by an active rock format on September 3, 2021.

Until April 1, 2013, Cape Cod's Frank FM was simulcast on the station now known as WHYA. (For most of this period, the WFRQ call letters were assigned to that station, and the current WFRQ broadcast as WFQR). WHYA now broadcasts a contemporary hit radio format.

Until February 18, 2017, the Frank FM branding was used in the Midcoast Maine area on WBYA in Islesboro. WBYA's format was then moved to WBQX, replacing the WBACH classical music format. WBYA now airs a country music format.
