= WKXL =

- Concord, New Hampshire; United States
- Broadcast area: Concord and vicinity
- Frequency: 1450 kHz
- Branding: New Hampshire Talk Radio 103.9 – 1450

Programming
- Format: News/talk
- Affiliations: AP Radio; Bloomberg Radio

Ownership
- Owner: Gordon J. Humphrey; (New Hampshire Family Radio LLC)

History
- First air date: June 15, 1946

Technical information
- Licensing authority: FCC
- Facility ID: 8694
- Class: C
- Power: 1,000 watts unlimited
- Transmitter coordinates: 43°11′39.29″N 71°33′15.26″W
- Translators: 101.9 W270DS (Concord) (Note: Despite the city of license, W270DS actually serves as WKXL's Manchester transmitter.); 103.9 W280EC (Concord)

Links
- Public license information: Public file; LMS
- Webcast: Listen live
- Website: www.nhtalkradio.com

WKXL (1450 AM) is a radio station broadcasting a talk radio format. Licensed to Concord, New Hampshire, United States, the station serves the Concord area. The station is currently owned by New Hampshire Family Radio LLC, itself owned by former Senator Gordon J. Humphrey, and features programming from AP Radio and Bloomberg Radio.

== History ==
=== Early years ===
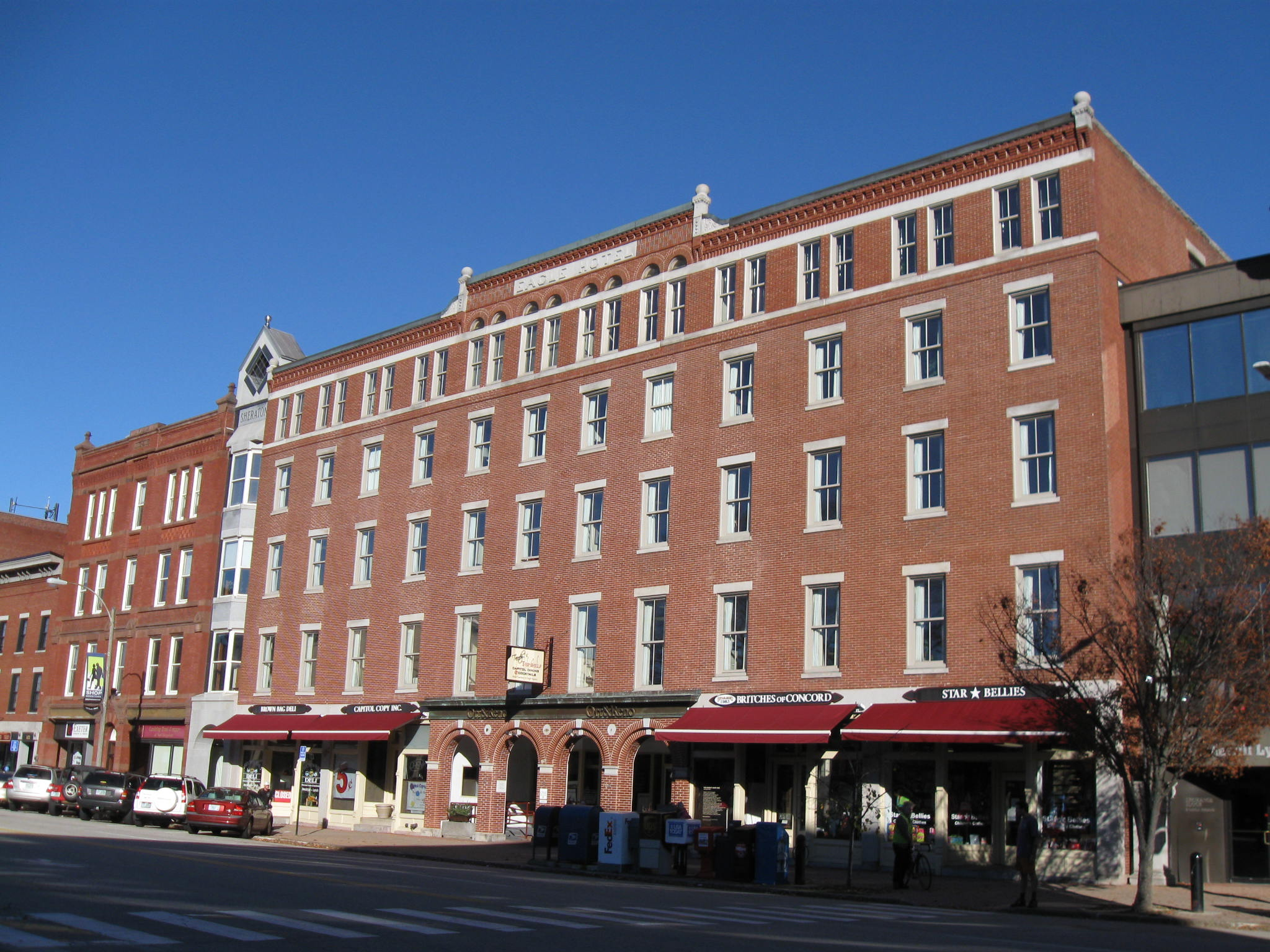
The historic Eagle Hotel housed WKXL's first studios and offices

On December 6, 1945, the Federal Communications Commission (FCC) issued a construction permit to Charles M. Dale, then the sitting Governor of New Hampshire, for a new 250-watt radio station on 1450 kHz in Concord. The station signed on June 15, 1946, with studios in the historic Eagle Hotel and an adjoining building.

After five years, Dale sold WKXL to Capitol Broadcasting Corporation, a consortium formed by part-owners of WFEA at Manchester, for $50,000 in 1951. Under Capitol ownership, the station became a CBS Radio affiliate from 1951 to 1959 and again beginning in December 1962. The original principals in Capitol sold the company to H. Scott Killgore, a 20-year radio veteran, for $75,000 in 1954. That same year, Tom Shovan, who would be instrumental in shaping the careers of Rick Dees and Laura Schlesinger, started his radio career as a disc jockey at WKXL; he was just 12 years old.

Another sale followed three years later to Frank Estes and Joseph Close, owners of WKNE (1290 kHz) in Keene and WKNY in Kingston, New York. A power increase followed to 1,000 watts during the day, approved in 1961. The station expanded its service to FM when WKXL-FM 102.3, an 80 percent simulcast of the AM frequency and its middle of the road format, began broadcasting on March 7, 1972.

In 1980, Estes, who had bought out Close, sold the WKXL stations to a consortium of seven station employees, continuing under the name Capitol Broadcasting Corporation, led by Dick Osborne, Don Shapiro and Pat Chaloux, in a transaction valued at $1.5 million.

WKXL-FM was largely a repeater of the 1450 AM broadcast until 1986, when the owners launched a "light alternative" adult album alternative format; this format ended in 1991, when financial pressures returned the FM signal to a simulcast of the AM broadcast. Music programming on the stations ended altogether in 1995, as their adult contemporary format gave way to news, talk, and sports.

=== Vox cutbacks and restoration under Bailey and Humphrey ===
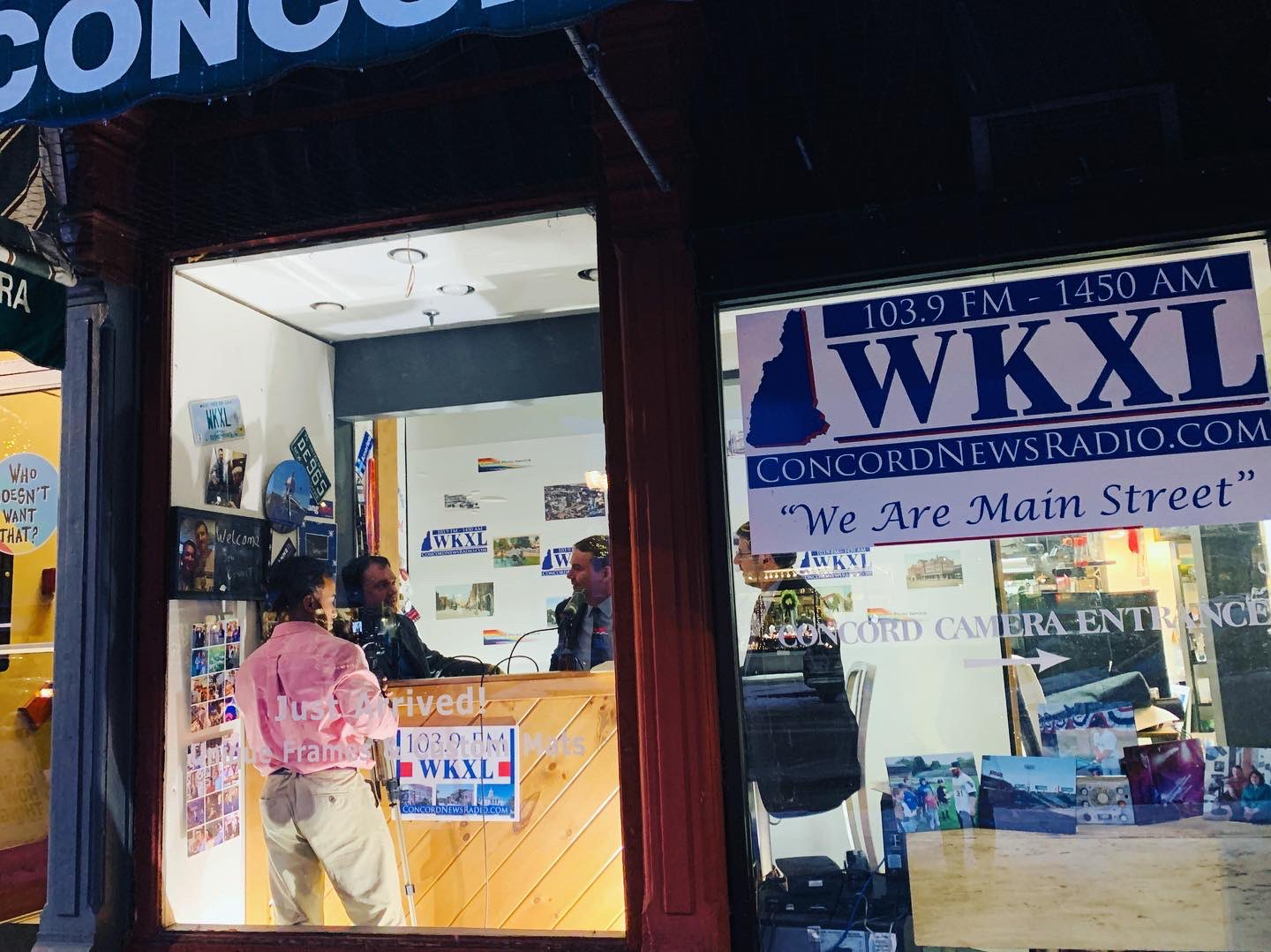
The WKXL street-front studio at Concord Camera in downtown Concord, seen in 2019.

In 1999, WKXL and its sister stations were sold by their employee-owners to Vox Media Group. Major cutbacks in programming followed, including the cancellation of the station's "Party Line" program and live broadcasts of the city council; ratings fell as a result. The FM simulcast would move from 102.3, repurposed as country music station WOTX, to WRCI (107.7) in 2000; the 102.3 FM signal is now broadcasting as WAKC.

After three years, Vox sold the station to Warren Bailey, operations manager of WLNH-FM in Laconia; under his ownership, more local programs were restored to the WKXL lineup, including a talk show hosted by Arnie Arnesen and New Hampshire Fisher Cats minor league baseball. WKXL-FM, not included in the sale, would retain WKXL's previous lineup under a new identity: WTPL. In 2003, WTPL would also come under Embro's control under a local marketing agreement; Arnesen's program, which had been based at WNTK in Newport before relocating to Concord, would air on both stations, as would the Fisher Cats.

The station was acquired by former New Hampshire senator Gordon J. Humphrey, alongside business partner George Stevens, for $830,000 in 2004; former owner Bailey cited the sale as a "golden opportunity" even though he had owned the station just 18 months. The transaction separated WKXL from operational control of WTPL; Arnie Arnesen's talk show would move solely to WTPL, while the Fisher Cats remained on WKXL.

WKXL began airing on FM translator W280EC (103.9 FM) in the early 2010s. In 2014, the station acquired it outright from New Hampshire Gospel Radio for $5,000.

=== Notable awards ===
Several WKXL broadcasters have been honored by the New Hampshire Association of Broadcasters as Broadcaster of the Year, including Frank Estes (1979), Dick Osborne (1981, 1989) and Jim Jeanotte (2012). Jeanotte was also the long-time host of Granite State Challenge, a New Hampshire Public Television high school quizbowl program. Osborne was also recognized in 2004 by The New Hampshire Legends Hockey Hall of Fame, as WKXL broadcast University of New Hampshire Wildcats hockey for many years, along with other WKXL announcers Harvey Smith and Jim Rivers. Jeanotte was honored in 2012 by the University of New Hampshire for his work on UNH sports broadcasts.

== Translators ==
Call sign	Frequency	City of license	FID	ERP (W)	HAAT	Class	Transmitter coordinates	FCC info	Notes
W270DS	101.9 FM	Concord, New Hampshire	202530	65	0 m (0 ft)	D	42°58′54.7″N 71°35′19.6″W	LMS	Serves Manchester, New Hampshire
W280EC	103.9 FM	Concord, New Hampshire	145612	38	162.8 m (534 ft)	D	43°11′41″N 71°33′18″W	LMS	
