= WWLK-FM =

- Meredith, New Hampshire; United States
- Broadcast area: Lakes Region
- Frequency: 101.5 MHz
- Branding: Lakes 101.5

Programming
- Format: Soft adult contemporary
- Affiliations: Compass Media Networks

Ownership
- Owner: Dirk Nadon; (Lakes Media, LLC)
- Sister stations: WASR; WLKZ

History
- First air date: November 16, 1988
- Former call signs: WMRQ (1988–1990); WWSS (1990–1994); WBHG (1994–2005); WWHQ (2005–2012); WZEI (2012–2020)
- Call sign meaning: "Lakes"

Technical information
- Licensing authority: FCC
- Facility ID: 73216
- Class: A
- ERP: 6,000 watts
- HAAT: 100 meters (330 ft)
- Transmitter coordinates: 43.596°N 71.498°W

Links
- Public license information: Public file; LMS
- Webcast: Listen live
- Website: www.lakes1015.com

WWLK-FM (101.5 MHz) is a commercial radio station licensed to Meredith, New Hampshire, and serving the Lakes Region. The station broadcasts a soft adult contemporary radio format and is owned by Dirk Nadon, through licensee Lakes Media, LLC. The studios and offices are on Church Street in Concord, New Hampshire.

WWLK-FM has an effective radiated power (ERP) of 6,000 watts. The transmitter is on Pickerel Pond Road at Parade Road in Laconia, New Hampshire.

== History ==
=== Rock format ===
The station signed on the air on November 16, 1988. It was owned by Latchkey Broadcasting and aired an adult album-oriented rock format under the call sign WMRQ. The station was founded by Dirk Nadon and his stepfather Bill Forbes.

In a 2018 interview with The Laconia Daily Sun, Nadon recalled that, "At the time, it was the only rock station north of Manchester," with that city's WGIR-FM being the nearest rock station and most Lakes Region stations programming adult contemporary formats.

=== Adult contemporary ===
In May 1990, WMRQ flipped to an adult contemporary format as "Sunny 101.5". It changed its call sign to WWSS on May 1.

The death of Bill Forbes and the economic impact of a banking crisis eventually forced Nadon to sell the station. In 1992, under a local marketing agreement (LMA), WWSS came under common management with WLNH AM-FM in Laconia. In 1994, Latchkey sold the station to WLNH's owner, Sconnix Broadcasting, for $80,000. Ahead of the sale, WWSS temporarily went silent in January 1994. WWSS had been slated to be acquired by Gary W. Hammond in a $185,000 deal a year earlier; Hammond ultimately purchased WLNH (AM) from Sconnix.

=== Classic rock ===
On February 28, 1994, the station changed its call sign to WBHG. It relaunched as classic rock station "Big 101.5".

Sconnix sold its Lakes Region stations — WBHG, WLNH-FM, and WEMJ (1490 AM) — to Nassau Broadcasting Partners for $5 million in 2004. The three stations were the last to be held by Sconnix. On February 4, 2005, Nassau relaunched the station as WWHQ. It called itself "101.5 The Hawk." Under the new identity, the station was operated jointly with WOTX-FM (102.3) in Concord, which soon became WWHK. In March 2008, WWHQ shifted from classic rock to a more mainstream rock format. WWHQ's simulcast with WWHK ended on August 22, 2008, after Nassau Broadcasting Partners was forced by the Federal Communications Commission (FCC) to end its joint sales agreement with WWHK owner Capitol Broadcasting.

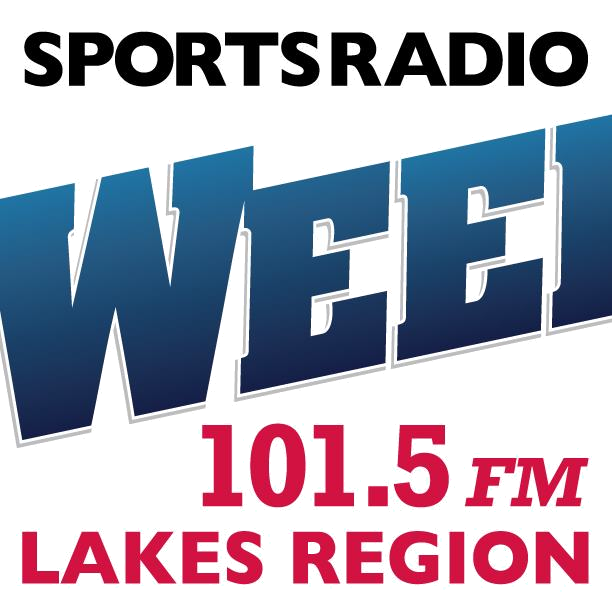
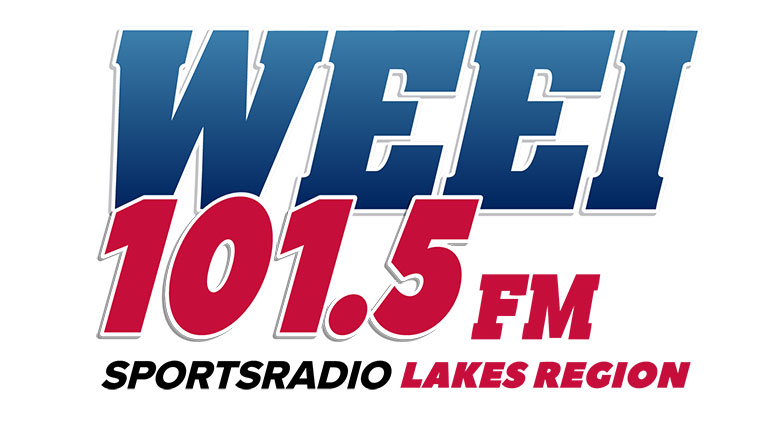
Logos as WZEI

On April 27, 2009, it was announced that WWHQ and WNNH (99.1 FM) in Henniker would be spun off into a divestiture trust and sold as part of a debt-for-equity restructuring of Nassau Broadcasting in which Goldman Sachs became 85% owner of the company. The new ownership structure ended Nassau's grandfathered status with respect to how many stations in the Concord (Lakes Region) market it could own. On November 4, 2009, WWHQ began stunting while its "Hawk"-branded classic rock format moved to WLKZ (104.9 FM) in Wolfeboro, New Hampshire. WWHQ went silent on March 1, 2010, due to power failure. With the loss of electricity, management did not intend to return the station to the air until the completion of the transfer of ownership. However in February 2011, WWHQ resumed broadcasting as a simulcast of Nassau's WBACH network of classical music stations in Maine.

WWHQ and 29 other Nassau stations in Northern New England were purchased at bankruptcy auction by Carlisle Capital Corporation, a company controlled by Bill Binnie (owner of WBIN-TV in Derry and WYCN-LP in Nashua), on May 22, 2012. The station, and 12 of the other stations, was then acquired by Vertical Capital Partners, controlled by Jeff Shapiro. The sale of WWHQ and the other 12 stations was consummated on November 30, 2012, at a purchase price of $4.4 million. After a brief silent period, the station returned to the air with a simulcast of new sister station WTPL (107.7 FM).

=== Sports radio ===
On December 24, 2012, the station changed its call sign to WZEI. Several days later, on January 4, 2013, the station switched to a sports talk format provided by the WEEI Sports Radio Network. As WWHQ, the station had previously planned to join the network in January 2008, but the deal between Nassau and Entercom ended up collapsing. The Vertical Capital Partners stations were transferred to Shapiro's existing Great Eastern Radio group on January 1, 2013.

Effective August 1, 2017, Great Eastern Radio sold WZEI, WLKZ, and WTPL to Dirk Nadon's Lakes Media, LLC for $2.6 million. Nadon had long sought to reacquire the station. In the interim, for a time he was program director of Boston-area FM station 93.7 WCGY, a forerunner to WEEI-FM. He later served as the vice president of engineering for Binnie Media.

=== Soft AC ===
On July 1, 2020, WZEI replaced the WEEI sports programming with a soft adult contemporary format, branded "Lakes 101.5". The call sign was changed to WWLK-FM.
