= WOTX =

Classic hits radio station in Lunenburg, Vermont

- Lunenburg, Vermont; United States
- Broadcast area: Littleton, New Hampshire; St. Johnsbury, Vermont
- Frequency: 93.7 MHz
- Branding: The Outlaw

Programming
- Format: Classic hits and classic rock

Ownership
- Owner: Radio New England Broadcasting, LLC
- Sister stations: WKDR; WLTN; WLTN-FM; WMOU; WOXX; WXXS

History
- First air date: 2008
- Former call signs: WXBN (2/2007-9/2007, CP)

Technical information
- Licensing authority: FCC
- Facility ID: 166090
- Class: A
- ERP: 460 watts
- HAAT: 279 meters (915 ft)
- Transmitter coordinates: 44°23′39.2″N 71°39′18.3″W
- Translator: 94.1 W231BW (Littleton, NH)
- Repeater: 1490 WKDR (Berlin)

Links
- Public license information: Public file; LMS

WOTX (93.7 FM) is a radio station licensed to serve Lunenburg, Vermont. The station is owned by Alexxon Corp. The station signed on the air on May 5, 2008 with a classic hits and classic rock hybrid format branded as "The Outlaw".

The station has been assigned these call letters by the Federal Communications Commission since September 11, 2007.

== Translators ==
In addition to the main station, WOTX is relayed by additional translators.

Call sign	Frequency	City of license	FID	ERP (W)	Class	FCC info	Notes
W231BW	94.1 FM	Littleton, New Hampshire	140105	250	D	LMS	Relays WOTX
W257CP	99.3 FM	Berlin, New Hampshire	155261	240	D	LMS	Relays WKDR
