= WMOU =

- Berlin, New Hampshire; United States
- Broadcast area: North Country
- Frequency: 1230 kHz
- Branding: Kiss 102.3

Programming
- Format: Top 40/CHR

Ownership
- Owner: Barry and Brian Lunderville; (Radiotron, LLC)
- Sister stations: WKDR; WLTN; WLTN-FM; WOTX; WOXX; WXXS

History
- Former call signs: WIGW (1987–1989)

Technical information
- Licensing authority: FCC
- Facility ID: 48404
- Class: C
- Power: 1,000 watts daytime; 930 watts nighttime
- Transmitter coordinates: 44°28′58.2″N 71°10′36.3″W
- Translator: 107.9 W300DN (Berlin)

Links
- Public license information: Public file; LMS

WMOU (1230 AM) is a radio station licensed to Berlin, New Hampshire, United States, with offices located in Littleton, New Hampshire. The station serves New Hampshire's North Country. WMOU is owned by Barry P. and Brian Lunderville.

== History ==
The station was assigned the call letters WIGW in 1987; in 1989 the station changed its call sign to the current WMOU.

In July 2000, Jericho Broadcasting Co. LLC (Arnold P. Hanson Jr. and Steven D. Griffin, both managers/50% owners) reached an agreement to purchase WMOU from New England Broadcasting Inc. (Stephen E. Powell, president). At the time of the sale, WMOU broadcast an adult standards music format.

In the fall of 2008, WMOU began simulcasting the morning show of WLTN-FM and simulcasting WXXS the rest of the day and weekends. The station also added a broadcast translator, 106.1 W294AZ. During top-of-the-hour station identifications, WMOU is referred to on-air as "Kiss 106.1" in reference to the translator.

== Former on-air staff ==
Former WMOU employees (when the station was owned by Bob and Gladys Powell) include Leslie Howe, Donna "DL Daniels", James Patry, Sam Dube, Paul Gagne, Jay Charland, Mike Emery, Charlie in the morning and Carol Miller. Miller still performs a big band show each Saturday.

A mainstay of the station under various owners was Robert "Bob" Barbin. Barbin was news director for several decades and hosted a local radio/call in show Forum. During the Presidential Primary season, Forum was a frequent stop for politicos of all stripes. Barbin also hosted the local Swap Shop program. Barbin was laid off from the station during the latest round of cost cutting under Lunderville. In another cost-cutting measure, the WMOU offices were consolidated into the WLTN offices in downtown Littleton, New Hampshire; the building in Berlin containing the former location of the WMOU studios is on the market to eventually be sold to a new owner. Shortly thereafter, local programming on WMOU was dropped, in favor of simulcasting co-owned stations.
