= WWLK (AM) =

Eddyville, Kentucky; United States
- Frequency: 900 kHz

Programming
- Format: Defunct

Ownership
- Owner: Tilent, Inc.

History
- First air date: May 2, 1981; 44 years ago
- Last air date: 2012
- Former call signs: WEAK (1980–1986)

Technical information
- Facility ID: 36402
- Class: D
- Power: 1,000 watts day 120 watts night
- Transmitter coordinates: 37°4′26″N 88°4′48″W

WWLK (900 AM) was a radio station licensed to serve Eddyville, Kentucky, United States. The station was owned by Tilent, Inc.

== History ==
The station, which was a 250-watt daytime-only station, was assigned a construction permit with the assigned callsign WEAK on September 15, 1980, under original ownership by Lyon County Broadcasting Company. On May 2, 1981, the station was launched by a group of local business people. On March 14, 1986, the station changed its call sign to WWLK following the purchase of the station by Brian Gentry.

The station had been broadcasting a Country music format from its sign on until it was acquired by Bible Time Ministries, albeit with Tilent, Inc. as its licensee on July 20, 1989. The ministries converted it into a Christian radio station as part of its group of stations.

On April 19, 2012, the station's license was cancelled and its call sign deleted by the Federal Communications Commission.
