= WASR (AM) =

WASR and WCGY-FM
WASR: Wolfeboro, New Hampshire; WCGY-FM: Jefferson, New Hampshire; United States
- Broadcast area: WASR: Lakes Region, southern White Mountains; WCGY-FM: North Country, White Mountains Region
- Frequencies: WASR: 1420 kHz; WCGY-FM: 97,3 MHz
- Branding: Mountain Country NH

Programming
- Format: Country
- Affiliations: Total Traffic and Weather Network

Ownership
- Owner: Dirk Nadon; (Lakes Media, LLC)
- Sister stations: WLKZ; WWLK-FM

History
- First air date: WASR: April 1970; WCGY-FM: July 26, 2022

Technical information
- Licensing authority: FCC
- Facility ID: WASR: 54889; WCGY-FM: 762191
- Class: WASR: D; WCGY-FM: A
- Power: WASR: 500 watts day; 136 watts night
- ERP: WCGY-FM: 6,000 watts
- HAAT: WCGY-FM: −83 meters (−272 ft)
- Transmitter coordinates: WASR: 43°35′30.9″N 71°13′9.3″W; WCGY-FM: 44°21′53.5″N 71°23′20.8″W
- Translator(s): WASR: 97.1 W246DI (Wolfeboro); WASR: 96.1 W241AJ (Laconia)

Links
- Public license information: WASR: Public file; LMS; WCGY-FM: Public file; LMS
- Webcast: Listen live
- Website: mountaincountrynh.com

WASR (1420 AM) and WCGY-FM (97.3 FM) are commercial radio stations broadcasting a country music format. WASR is licensed to Wolfeboro, New Hampshire, and serves the Lakes Region. WCGY-FM is licensed to Jefferson, New Hampshire, and serves the North Country and White Mountains Region. The stations are owned by Dirk Nadon's Lakes Media, LLC. WASR is also heard on two 250-watt FM translators: 97.1 W246DI in Wolfeboro, and 96.1 W241AJ in Laconia.

WASR went on the air in 1970, and previously broadcast adult standards, talk radio, variety hits, and classic hits formats. WCGY-FM began broadcasting in 2022, and started simulcasting on WASR in 2024.

== History ==
At one time, WASR was an adult standards station, carrying Citadel Media's Timeless service. It also tried conservative talk with little success.

On February 24, 2020, new station manager Eric Scott changed the format to variety hits with some local talk including a live call in show at noon, a local sports show on Friday afternoons, and a live Catholic Mass Sunday mornings. WASR also carried the WTPL-produced talk show Good Morning New Hampshire, hosted by Jack Heath.

At the end of 2023, Eric Scott retired and WASR contracted with consultant J. R. Russ Programming & Research to assist in the day to day programming. Among Russ' accomplishments was a focusing and re-branding of the station to "971 The Shore" to take advantage of the resort area known as the "Seven Lakes Region" with the slogan of "It's BETTER on the Shore". Music programming was skewed to lean more classic rock with a classic hits, yacht rock and oldies blend that was "tempo-flowed".

In May of that year the syndicated Todd Newton Morning Show from SuiteRadio was added with the initial sponsorship of a septic service company and branding the show as "The only morning show sponsored by poop" which generated considerable market publicity. Russ was the consistent voice of imaging, commercials, promos and features always with a local "Lakes Region" focus.

In June 2024, the $75,000 sale of WASR from Winnipesaukee Radio Station to Dirk Nadon's Lakes Media, owner of WWLK-FM and WLKZ, was announced. That August, Lakes Media purchased for $7,500 a second translator for WASR: W241AJ (96.1), which had been owned by New Hampshire Gospel Radio.

In addition to WWLK-FM and WLKZ, Lakes Media owned a station in Jefferson, New Hampshire: WCGY-FM 97.3, which signed on as country music station "Mountain Country 97.3" on July 26, 2022. On September 11, 2024, WASR replaced "The Shore" classic hits format with a simulcast of WCGY-FM as "Mountain Country 97".

== Translators ==
Broadcast translators for WASR
| Call sign | Frequency | City of license | FID | ERP (W) | Class | Transmitter coordinates | FCC info |
|---|---|---|---|---|---|---|---|
| W241AJ | 96.1 FM | Laconia, New Hampshire | 142346 | 250 | D | 43°32′45.6″N 71°22′41.1″W | LMS |
| W246DI | 97.1 FM | Wolfeboro, New Hampshire | 145595 | 250 | D | 43°48′31.7″N 71°12′53.4″W | LMS |
