= WBYY =

Simulcast of WFNQ, Nashua
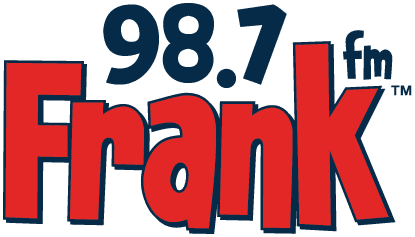
- Somersworth, New Hampshire; United States
- Broadcast area: Seacoast Region
- Frequency: 98.7 MHz (HD Radio)
- Branding: 98.7 Frank FM

Programming
- Format: Classic hits
- Subchannels: HD2: News–talk (WTSN simulcast)
- Affiliations: New England Patriots Radio Network

Ownership
- Owner: Binnie Media; (WBIN Media Co., Inc.)
- Sister stations: WTSN

History
- First air date: January 25, 1995 (as WRGW)
- Former call signs: WTSN-FM (1991–1993, CP); WRZY (1993–1994, CP); WRGW (1994–1996); WRDX (1996)
- Call sign meaning: "The Bay" (previous format)

Technical information
- Licensing authority: FCC
- Facility ID: 23253
- Class: A
- ERP: 6,000 watts
- HAAT: 96 meters (315 ft)
- Transmitter coordinates: 43°14′11.3″N 70°53′35.2″W

Links
- Public license information: Public file; LMS
- Webcast: Listen live (via WFNQ)
- Website: frankfmradio.com

WBYY (98.7 FM; "Frank FM") is a radio station broadcasting a classic hits format. Licensed to Somersworth, New Hampshire, United States, with studios in Dover, the station serves the Seacoast Region of New Hampshire and Southern Maine. The station is owned by Binnie Media.

== History ==
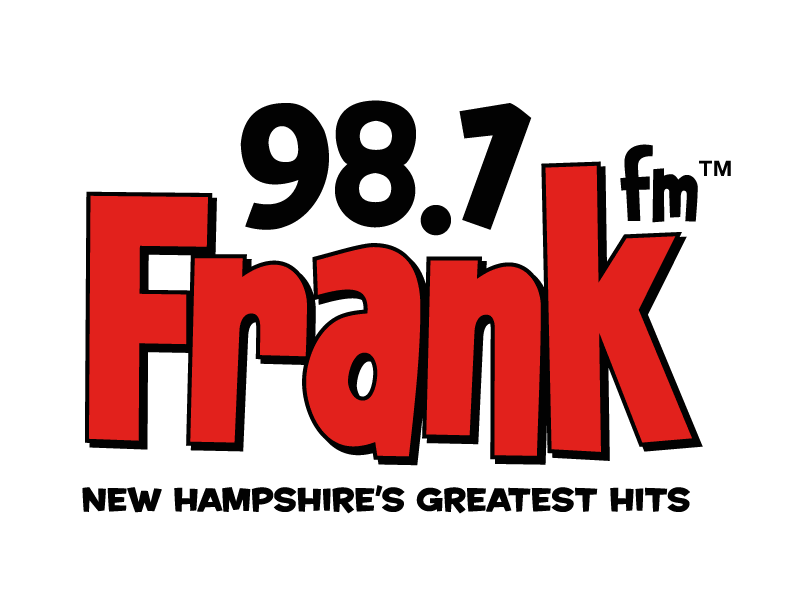
Original version of the "98.7 Frank FM" logo

The station was assigned the call letters WTSN-FM on September 6, 1991. The call sign was changed to WRZY on October 15, 1993, and to WRGW on April 18, 1994; under that call sign, the station took to the air January 25, 1995, with an adult contemporary format branded as "The Rock Garden". The station changed its call letters to WRDX on April 15, 1996, concurrent with a switch to an adult standards format branded "Radio Deluxe"; however, the AC format returned a month later, and the station became WBYY on June 14, 1996, to reflect its "98.7 The Bay" branding.

On August 31, 2015, WBYY and its sister station WTSN announced plans to merge with Port Broadcasting's WNBP and WWSF and Aruba Capital Holdings' WXEX and WXEX-FM to form Coastal Radio Partners. The three-way merger was not completed; on September 29, 2016, WBYY and WTSN were instead sold to Binnie Media for $2.1 million.

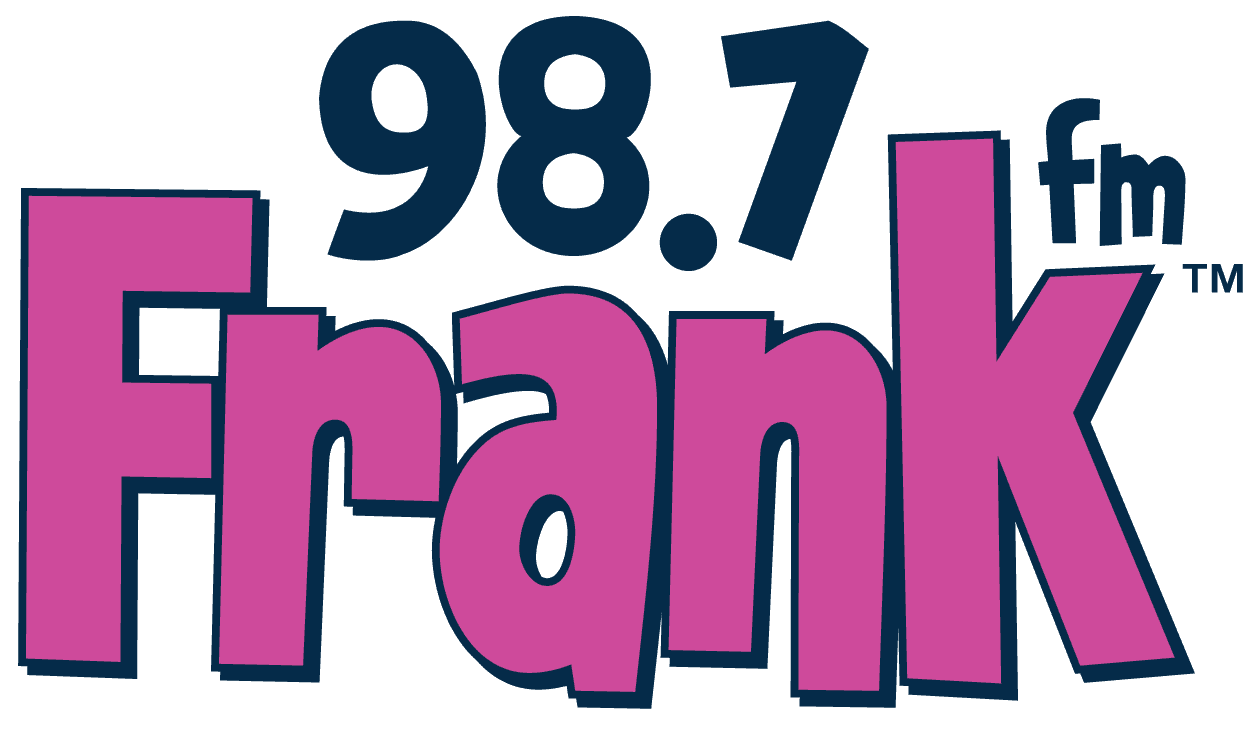
Pink version of the "Frank FM" logo, used during the hot AC format

On May 24, 2019, WBYY changed its format from adult contemporary to classic hits, branded as "Frank FM"; the programming is largely simulcast with Nashua sister station WFNQ, though WBYY breaks away for local commercials and station identifications. The "Frank FM" network, which also includes WLNH-FM in Laconia, transitioned to a hot adult contemporary format during 2021.

After morning host Marc Nazzaro (who used the air name "DJ Nazzy") was laid off from "Frank FM" in January 2023 as part of a refocus of Binnie Media's resources on its news and talk programming, vice president of programming Heath Cole told the Concord Monitor that "the music format that we do will change". On February 1, 2023, WBYY, along with the rest of the "Frank FM" network, returned to a classic hits format; the stations also dropped their remaining on-air staff, who were reassigned to other positions within the company.
