= WSCY =

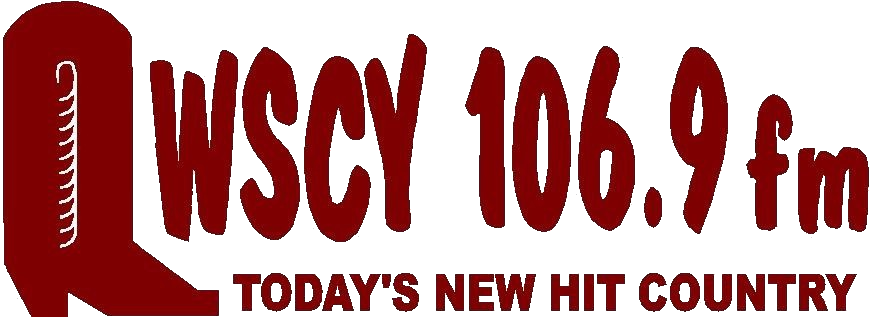
- Moultonborough, New Hampshire; United States
- Broadcast area: Lakes Region
- Frequency: 106.9 MHz
- Branding: WSCY 106.9 FM

Programming
- Format: New country
- Affiliations: Westwood One

Ownership
- Owner: Northeast Communications Corporation

History
- First air date: May 31, 1993
- Call sign meaning: "Super Country" (former branding)

Technical information
- Licensing authority: FCC
- Facility ID: 49387
- Class: A
- ERP: 4,300 watts
- HAAT: 118.8 meters (390 ft)
- Transmitter coordinates: 43°35′46.3″N 71°29′53.3″W

Links
- Public license information: Public file; LMS
- Website: www.wscy.com

WSCY (106.9 FM) is a radio station broadcasting a new country format. Licensed to Moultonborough, New Hampshire, United States, the station serves the Lakes Region. The station is owned by Northeast Communications Corporation, headed by Jeff Fisher, and features programming from Westwood One and a live morning show hosted by Joyce Danas.

Former logo, under its former "Super Hit Country" branding (which was used from May 31, 1993—its first air date—until August 17, 2009).

The station broadcasts with an ERP of 4,300 watts from Parade Road in Laconia, New Hampshire. WSCY's studios are located in Franklin, New Hampshire, along with sisters WFTN AM–FM and WPNH AM–FM. The station does not stream its signal over the internet.
