= WKDR =

Satellite of WOTX, Lunenburg, Vermont
- Berlin, New Hampshire; United States
- Broadcast area: Berlin and Gorham, New Hampshire
- Frequency: 1490 kHz
- Branding: The Outlaw

Programming
- Format: Classic hits and classic rock

Ownership
- Owner: White Mountains Broadcasting, LLC
- Sister stations: WLTN; WLTN-FM; WMOU; WOTX; WOXX; WXXS

History
- First air date: August 2009

Technical information
- Licensing authority: FCC
- Facility ID: 160163
- Class: C
- Power: 1,000 watts (day); 930 watts (night)
- Transmitter coordinates: 44°28′58.21″N 71°10′36.28″W
- Translators: 92.5 W223DC (Berlin); 99.3 W257CP (Berlin)

Links
- Public license information: Public file; LMS

WKDR (1490 AM) is an American radio station licensed to serve the community of Berlin, New Hampshire. The station went on the air in August 2009 as a simulcast of co-owned WXXS in Lancaster. In summer 2010, the station began simulcasting 93.7 WOTX and added a broadcast translator W257CP (99.3 FM).

== Translators ==
Broadcast translators for WKDR
Call sign	Frequency	City of license	FID	ERP (W)	HAAT	Class	Transmitter coordinates	FCC info
W223DC	92.5 FM	Berlin, New Hampshire	201383	250	0 m (0 ft)	D	44.285600°N 71.103692°W	LMS
W257CP	99.3 FM	Berlin, New Hampshire	155261	240	−48 m (−157 ft)	D	44.482778°N 71.177222°W	LMS
