= WTPL =

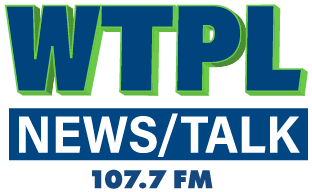
- Hillsborough, New Hampshire; United States
- Broadcast area: Manchester, New Hampshire
- Frequency: 107.7 MHz
- Branding: 107.7 WTPL

Programming
- Format: News/talk
- Affiliations: Fox News Radio; Compass Media Networks; Westwood One

Ownership
- Owner: Binnie Media; (WBIN Media Co., Inc.)
- Sister stations: WEMJ; WFNQ; WJYY; WLNH-FM; WNHW; WNNH

History
- First air date: October 1, 1989
- Former call signs: WRCI (1989–2000); WKXL-FM (2000–2002)
- Call sign meaning: "The Pulse"

Technical information
- Licensing authority: FCC
- Facility ID: 54910
- Class: A
- ERP: 1,250 watts
- HAAT: 217 meters (712 ft)
- Transmitter coordinates: 43°9′17.2″N 71°47′42.2″W

Links
- Public license information: Public file; LMS
- Webcast: Listen live
- Website: thepulseofnh.com

WTPL (107.7 FM) is a radio station broadcasting a news/talk format. Licensed to Hillsborough, New Hampshire, United States, it serves the Manchester area. The station is owned by Bill Binnie's Binnie Media, through licensee WBIN Media Co., Inc. It airs a news/talk radio format. It the flagship station of "The Pulse of NH", a trimulcast with WTSN in the Seacoast Region and WEMJ in the Lakes Region.

== History ==
The original construction permit for the station was granted on August 4, 1987, under the call sign of WRCI; a license to cover was granted on September 7, 1990. However, the station's original owners, Empire Radio Partners, filed for Chapter 11 bankruptcy in 1992, and the station was sold to Radioworks in 1993. By 1994, WRCI was serving as a simulcast of its then-sister station WJYY (105.5), an adult contemporary station. The station had changed simulcast partners to WNHI (93.3; now WNHW), a classic rock station, by 1996.

Radioworks sold its stations to Vox Media in 1999, and on December 27 the station was converted to the current news/talk format by way of a simulcast with another Vox station, WKXL, as part of a format shuffle that resulted in WKXL's original FM station, on 102.3, becoming the country music station WOTX-FM (now WAKC). The WKXL-FM call sign moved to 107.7 the following February.

Vox sold WKXL to Embro Communications in 2002. The sale did not include WKXL-FM or its programming; as a result, WKXL launched a separate news/talk format, with its prior programming remaining on 107.7 under the new call letters of WTPL. Embro took over WTPL as well under a local marketing agreement the next year, and reintroduced some shared programming, including a talk show hosted by Arnie Arnesen. Vox then sold WTPL to Great Eastern Radio (whose principal, Jeff Shapiro, had co-owned Vox with Bruce Danzinger), in 2004, and soon afterward the station again became independent of WKXL, relocating to studios in Bow, New Hampshire, and a transmitter atop Pats Peak, both originally constructed for WNNH (99.1). Clark Smidt, who founded WNNH, was involved with WTPL's operations at the time.

Effective August 1, 2017, Great Eastern Radio sold WTPL, WLKZ, and WZEI to Dirk Nadon's Lakes Media, LLC for $2.6 million. Lakes Media immediately agreed to sell WTPL to Binnie Media for $1.3 million and turned over the station's operations to Binnie under a local marketing agreement; the sale was completed on November 16, 2017.

== Programming ==
Weekday programming includes a local morning news and talk program, Morning Information Center, hosted by Mike Pomp; followed by Good Morning New Hampshire, hosted by Jack Heath. Syndicated programming includes The Rob Carson Show; Boston-based Howie Carr; Joe Pags; Rich Valdés America At Night; and Red Eye Radio. Most hours begin with Fox News Radio.

Weekend shows include Northeast Delta Dental Radio, Half Hour to Health, and nationally syndicated programs Real Estate Today and InfoTrak.

Sports programming includes live coverage of Boston Red Sox baseball and Boston Bruins hockey.
