= WEMJ =

Simulcasting WTPL, Hillsboro, NH
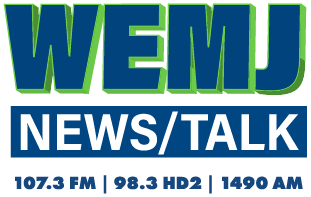
- Laconia, New Hampshire; United States
- Broadcast area: Lakes Region
- Frequency: 1490 kHz
- Branding: 107.3 WEMJ

Programming
- Format: Talk radio
- Affiliations: Fox News Radio; Compass Media Networks; Westwood One

Ownership
- Owner: Binnie Media; (WBIN Media Co., Inc.)
- Sister stations: WFNQ; WJYY; WLNH-FM; WNNH; WNHW; WTPL

History
- First air date: April 9, 1961
- Call sign meaning: Eileen M. Jaspert (former owner)

Technical information
- Licensing authority: FCC
- Facility ID: 67270
- Class: C
- Power: 1,000 watts (unlimited)
- Transmitter coordinates: 43°32′29.3″N 71°27′43.3″W
- Translator: 107.3 W297BS (Laconia)
- Repeater: 98.3 WLNH-FM HD2 (Laconia)

Links
- Public license information: Public file; LMS
- Webcast: Listen live
- Website: thepulseofnh.com

WEMJ (1490 AM) is a radio station broadcasting a talk format. Licensed to Laconia, New Hampshire, United States, the station is owned by Binnie Media and licensed to WBIN Media Co., Inc. WEMJ features programming from Fox News Radio. WEMJ is known on-air as 107.3 WEMJ (after its translator frequency). It is part of the "Pulse of NH" trimulcast with WTPL in the Manchester area and WTSN in the Seacoast Region.

== History ==
WEMJ went on the air April 9, 1961, as a CBS Radio Network affiliate owned by the New Hampshire Broadcasting Corporation. The company's principal, George H. Jasper III, also owned WCCM in Lawrence, Massachusetts.

WEMJ, along with 16 other stations in northern New England formerly owned by Nassau Broadcasting Partners, was purchased at bankruptcy auction by WBIN Media Company, a company controlled by Bill Binnie, on May 22, 2012. Binnie already owned WBIN-TV in Derry and WYCN-CD in Nashua. The deal was completed on November 30, 2012. In March 2016, WEMJ began a simulcast on W297BS (107.3 FM, referred to as "WEMJ-FM" by the New Hampshire Association of Broadcasters) and updated its branding to reflect this new over-the-air listening option.

WEMJ dropped its news/talk programming on May 23, 2019, becoming a Lakes Region simulcast of Binnie's contemporary hit radio station in Concord, WJYY (105.5 FM). In October 2020, coinciding with the launch of a late morning talk show hosted by former WGIR morning host Jack Heath (which airs on WEMJ, WTPL, and WTSN), WEMJ returned to a news/talk format.

== Translators ==
In addition to the main station, WEMJ is relayed by an FM translator.

Broadcast translator for WEMJ
Call sign	Frequency	City of license	FID	ERP (W)	Class	Transmitter coordinates	FCC info
W297BS	107.3 FM	Laconia, New Hampshire	83636	250	D	43°33′9.3″N 71°34′43.3″W	LMS

== Previous logos ==
Logo prior to the addition of the FM translator

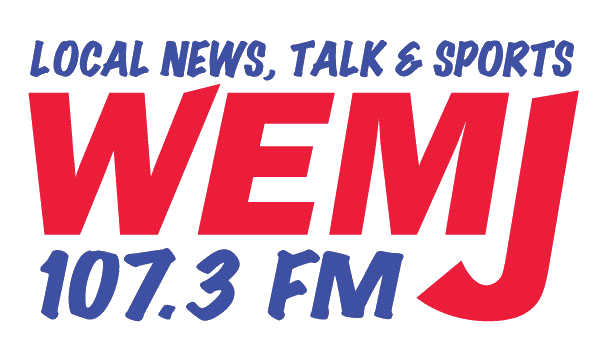
Logo prior to the WJYY simulcast

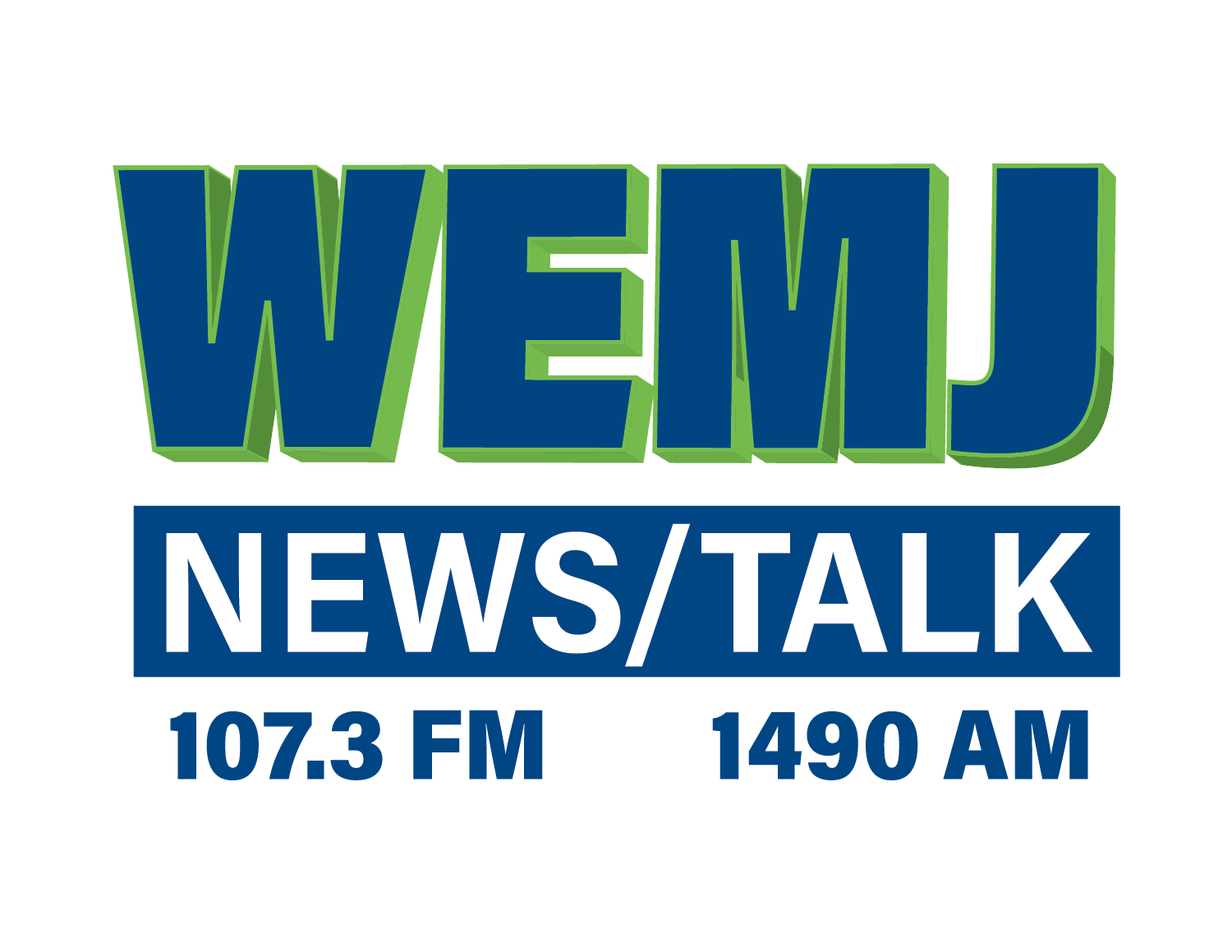
Logo prior to the addition of a simulcast on WLNH-FM HD2
