= WOXX =

Classic hits radio station in Colebrook, New Hampshire

- Colebrook, New Hampshire; United States
- Broadcast area: Northeast Kingdom
- Frequency: 97.1 MHz
- Branding: The Outlaw

Programming
- Format: Classic hits and classic rock

Ownership
- Owner: White Mountains Broadcasting LLC
- Sister stations: WKDR; WLTN; WLTN-FM; WMOU; WOTX; WXXS

History
- First air date: December 22, 2011
- Former call signs: WUKV (2008–2011)

Technical information
- Licensing authority: FCC
- Facility ID: 170980
- Class: A
- ERP: 700 watts
- HAAT: −69.5 meters (−228 ft)
- Transmitter coordinates: 44°54′47.5″N 71°28′51.2″W

Links
- Public license information: Public file; LMS

WOXX (97.1 FM) is a radio station licensed to serve Colebrook, New Hampshire, United States, serving the Northern New Hampshire area. The station is owned by White Mountains Broadcasting LLC.

On December 22, 2011, WOXX signed on the air with a classic hits and classic rock hybrid format branded as "The Outlaw", similar to sister station WOTX in Lunenburg, Vermont. Despite the similar call sign and format to WOTX, WOXX is operated separately.
