= WLKZ =

- Wolfeboro, New Hampshire; United States
- Broadcast area: Lakes Region
- Frequency: 104.9 MHz
- Branding: 104.9 The Hawk

Programming
- Format: Classic rock
- Affiliations: United Stations Radio Networks

Ownership
- Owner: Dirk Nadon; (Lakes Media, LLC)
- Sister stations: WASR; WWLK-FM

History
- First air date: February 1, 1985
- Call sign meaning: "Lakes"

Technical information
- Licensing authority: FCC
- Facility ID: 65624
- Class: A
- ERP: 620 watts
- HAAT: 310 meters (1,020 ft)
- Transmitter coordinates: 43°32′45.6″N 71°22′41.1″W

Links
- Public license information: Public file; LMS
- Webcast: Listen live
- Website: www.thehawkrocks.com

WLKZ (104.9 FM) is an American licensed radio station in Wolfeboro, New Hampshire, serving the Lakes Region. The station is owned by Dirk Nadon, through licensee Lakes Media, LLC, and carries a classic rock format, under the "104.9 The Hawk" branding.

== History ==
The original construction permit for the station was granted on July 1, 1983, and the WLKZ call letters were assigned on October 11; it took to the air on February 1, 1985, and a license to cover was granted on June 4, 1985.

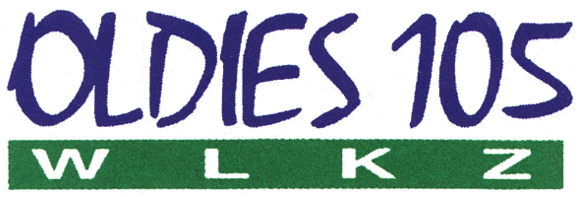
Former logo under the "Oldies 105" branding

During the 1980s, WLKZ offered an adult contemporary format; by 1996, it was offering an oldies format. Initially, the station aired the format on its own; however, in 2000, original owner Jay Williams sold the station to Tele-Media, owner of similarly-formatted WNNH in the nearby Concord market. Tele-Media sold WLKZ, WNNH, and Nashua-based WHOB to Nassau Broadcasting Partners in 2004. Nevertheless, WLKZ continued to be programmed and branded separately from WNNH until 2007, when Nassau consolidated the two stations into a simulcast. That December, the stations shifted to Nassau's Frank FM classic hits format as a result of an unsuccessful attempt to convert WWHQ and WWHK (the then-homes for the "Hawk" classic rock format) to sports radio programming from WEEI.

After a corporate reorganization required Nassau to spin off WWHQ and WNNH, WLKZ discontinued the simulcast with WNNH, and dropped classic hits in favor of WWHQ's prior classic rock format on November 4, 2009. WLKZ, along with 29 other Nassau stations in northern New England, was purchased at bankruptcy auction by Carlisle Capital Corporation, a company controlled by Bill Binnie (owner of WBIN-TV in Derry), on May 22, 2012. The station, and 12 of the other stations, were then acquired by Vertical Capital Partners, controlled by Jeff Shapiro. The deal was completed on November 30, 2012. The Vertical Capital Partners stations were transferred to Shapiro's existing Great Eastern Radio group on January 1, 2013.

Effective August 1, 2017, Great Eastern Radio sold WLKZ, WTPL, and WZEI (the former WWHQ) to Dirk Nadon's Lakes Media, LLC for $2.6 million.
