= WTSN (AM) =

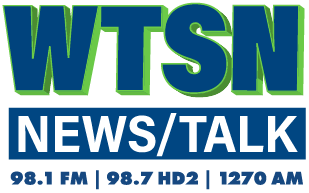
- Dover, New Hampshire; United States
- Broadcast area: Seacoast Region
- Frequency: 1270 kHz
- Branding: News Talk 98.1 WTSN

Programming
- Format: Talk radio
- Affiliations: Fox News Radio; Compass Media Networks; Westwood One; Boston Celtics Radio Network; Boston Red Sox Radio Network; Boston Bruins Radio Network

Ownership
- Owner: Binnie Media; (WBIN Media Co., Inc.)
- Sister stations: WBYY

History
- First air date: August 19, 1956
- Call sign meaning: "Twin State Network"

Technical information
- Licensing authority: FCC
- Facility ID: 23254
- Class: B
- Power: 5,000 watts
- Transmitter coordinates: 43°11′1.31″N 70°51′12.21″W
- Translator: 98.1 W251CF (Dover)
- Repeater: 98.7 WBYY HD2 (Somersworth)

Links
- Public license information: Public file; LMS
- Webcast: Listen live
- Website: thepulseofnh.com

WTSN (1270 AM) is a commercial radio station licensed to Dover, New Hampshire, United States, and serving the Seacoast Region of New Hampshire and Southern Maine. WTSN airs a talk format. It broadcasts with 5,000 watts of power from a transmitter on Back Road in Dover.

WTSN is simulcast locally on an FM translator at 98.1, W251CF, and regionally on WTPL (107.7 FM) in Manchester and WEMJ (1490 AM and 107.3 FM) in the Lakes Region. The station identifies itself using its FM frequency, "News Talk 98.1 WTSN".

== Programming ==
WTSN carries local and syndicated talk programming. The station began carrying the Boston-based Howie Carr Show in late afternoons on February 16, 2015. Mike Pomp hosts the Morning Information Center and Open Mic Show.

WTSN features local news updates throughout the day, business updates from CNBC Business Radio in addition to Fox News Radio updates. WTSN is the New Hampshire/Maine Seacoast home of the Boston Red Sox, the Boston Celtics and the Boston Bruins.

== History ==
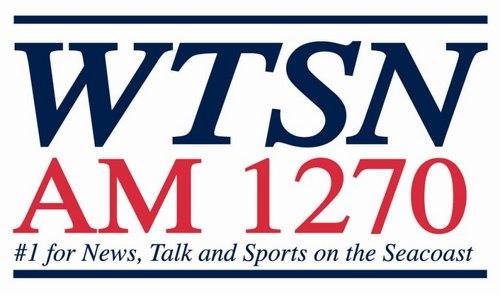
Logo for the station prior to November 2016

WTSN first signed on in 1956. The call sign was chosen because the original owner was the Twin State Network, which owned radio stations in both New Hampshire and Vermont.

In August 2015 WTSN and its sister station WBYY announced plans to join with Aruba Capital Holdings's WXEX and Port Broadcasting's WNBP and WWSF to form Coastal Media Partners, with Port Broadcasting management assuming immediate oversight of WTSN and WBYY. The merger failed to close, and in April 2016 WTSN and WBYY were sold to Binnie Media for $2.1 million. The sale officially closed on September 29, 2016.

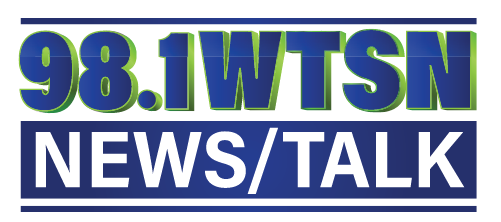
Logo for the station between November 2016 and April 2020

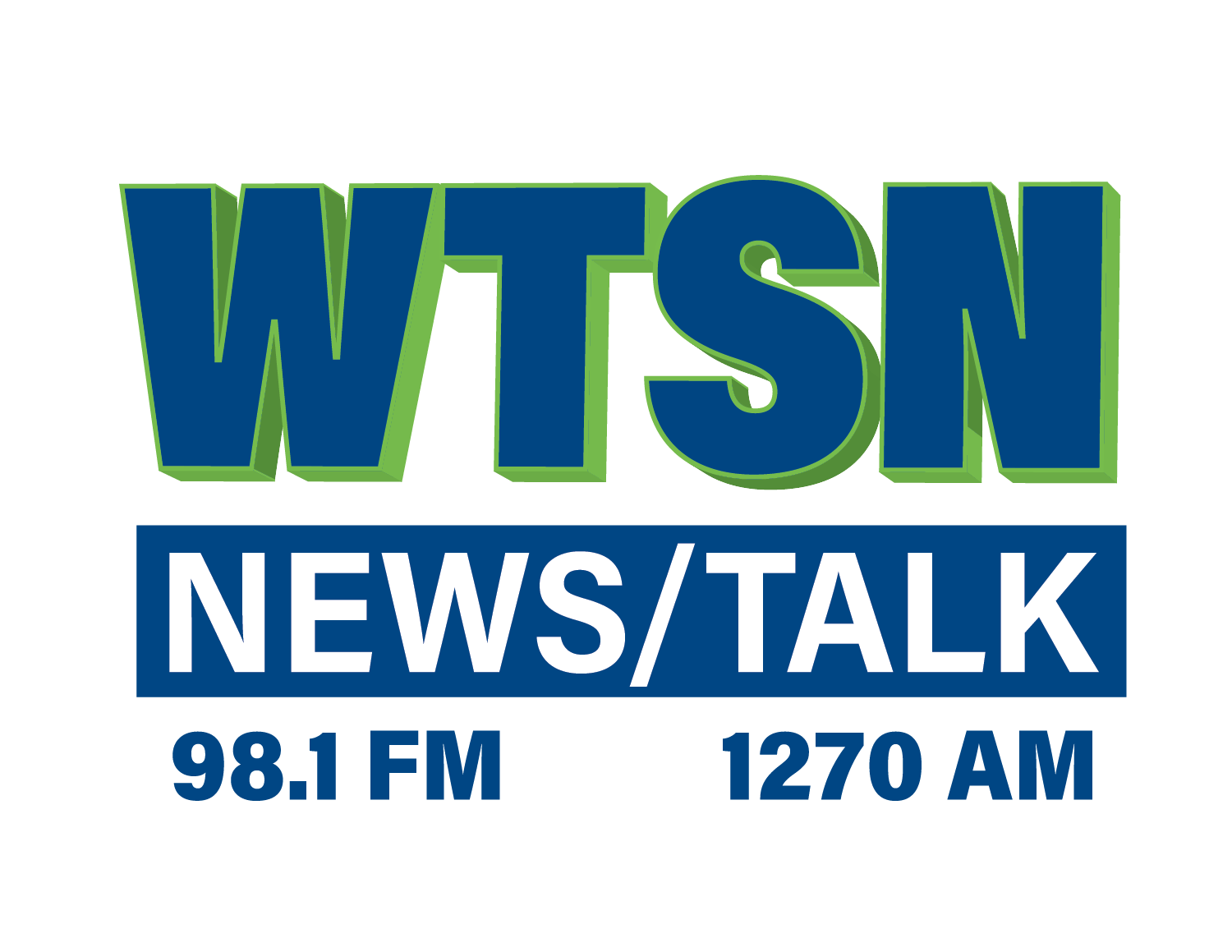
Logo for the station between April 2020 and September 2022

WTSN began a simulcast using an FM translator on 98.1 MHz (W251CF) in November 2016.

== Translators ==
Broadcast translator for WTSN
Call sign	Frequency	City of license	FID	ERP (W)	Class	Transmitter coordinates	FCC info
W251CF	98.1 FM	Dover, New Hampshire	138295	250	D	43°14′11.3″N 70°53′35.2″W	LMS

== Honors ==
WTSN was named the New Hampshire AM Radio Station of the year in 2006 by The New Hampshire Association of Broadcasters. WTSN was named the 2007 New Hampshire Radio Station of the year by the same broadcast organization. Mike Pomp was named the "Radio Personality of the Year" in 2016 by the New Hampshire Association of Broadcasters. He previously won in 2012, and was NH Broadcaster of the Year in 2009.
