= WLTN (AM) =

- Littleton, New Hampshire; United States
- Broadcast area: Grafton County; Coos County
- Frequency: 1400 kHz
- Branding: Oldies 1400 & The Golden Great 98

Programming
- Format: Oldies

Ownership
- Owner: Profile Broadcasting, LLC
- Sister stations: WKDR; WLTN-FM; WMOU; WOTX; WOXX; WXXS

History
- First air date: October 10, 1963
- Call sign meaning: Littleton

Technical information
- Licensing authority: FCC
- Facility ID: 53635
- Class: C
- Power: 1,000 watts
- Transmitter coordinates: 44°18′47.22″N 71°46′6.32″W
- Translators: 98.5 W253AY (Littleton); 107.5 W298CS (Littleton)

Links
- Public license information: Public file; LMS

WLTN is an American radio station licensed by the Federal Communications Commission (FCC) to serve the community of Littleton, New Hampshire, where the transmitter is also located.

== Current programming ==
WLTN is affiliated with CBS News Radio and airs newscasts every hour. WLTN is a broadcast outlet for Boston Red Sox baseball, through the Red Sox Radio Network.

== History ==
WLTN was built and owned and operated by John Bowman in 1963 The first FCC license renewal online shows that in 1982 WLTN was licensed to Profile Broadcasting Company. The station featured a news/talk format throughout the 1990s and early 2000s until Sharp Broadcasting (who had acquired the station in 1999 from Profile) transferred control (via local marketing agreement) to Barry Lunderville and changed formats to oldies. In June 2005 the license was transferred to Lunderville.

== Translators ==
In addition to the main station, WLTN is relayed by FM translators.

Broadcast translators for WLTN
| Call sign | Frequency | City of license | FID | ERP (W) | HAAT | Class | Transmitter coordinates | FCC info |
|---|---|---|---|---|---|---|---|---|
| W253AY | 98.5 FM | Littleton, New Hampshire | 140110 | 250 | −13.5 m (−44 ft) | D | 44°18′47.2″N 71°46′6.3″W | LMS |
| W298CS | 107.5 FM | Littleton, New Hampshire | 200568 | 250 | 0 m (0 ft) | D | 44°24′40.2″N 71°58′11.3″W | LMS |
