= WLTN-FM =

- Lisbon, New Hampshire; United States
- Broadcast area: Northeast Kingdom of Vermont; Coos County; Grafton County, New Hampshire
- Frequency: 96.7 MHz
- Branding: Mix 96.7

Programming
- Format: Full service adult contemporary

Ownership
- Owner: Profile Broadcasting, LLC
- Sister stations: WKDR; WLTN; WMOU; WOTX; WOXX; WXXS

History
- First air date: August 19, 1991
- Call sign meaning: Littleton

Technical information
- Licensing authority: FCC
- Facility ID: 53636
- Class: A
- ERP: 6,000 watts
- HAAT: 90 meters (300 ft)
- Transmitter coordinates: 44.220°N 71.868°W

Links
- Public license information: Public file; LMS

WLTN-FM is a full service adult contemporary formatted radio station in New Hampshire licensed to Lisbon, serving northern New Hampshire and the Northeast Kingdom of Vermont. WLTN-FM is owned by Barry P. Lunderville.

WLTN-FM went on the air August 19, 1991, as a Class A radio station broadcasting from Lisbon and with studios in Littleton. On air it was known as "Gold 96-7" and it was a locally-operated oldies radio station. In 1994, the services of Westwood One's Oldies Channel were instituted. In July 1999 ownership changed to Sharp Broadcasting and the format changed on September 12 of that year to its current adult contemporary format, switching satellite networks to Westwood's Bright AC and became known on air as Bright 96.7. When the station was sold to Lunderville, it became known as Mix 96.7. The station currently carries CBS News Radio. Sister station WLTN AM originally went on the air in 1963.
