= WXXS =

- Lancaster, New Hampshire; United States
- Broadcast area: Northeast Kingdom of Vermont; Coos County and Grafton County, New Hampshire
- Frequency: 102.3 MHz
- Branding: Kiss 102.3

Programming
- Format: CHR
- Affiliations: CBS News Radio

Ownership
- Owner: Radio New England Broadcasting, LLC
- Sister stations: WKDR; WLTN; WLTN-FM; WMOU; WOTX; WOXX

History
- First air date: 1997 (as WNHT)
- Call sign meaning: play on WXKS "Kiss 108" and WXXX "95 Triple X"

Technical information
- Licensing authority: FCC
- Facility ID: 77920
- Class: C3
- ERP: 1,500 watts
- HAAT: 294 meters (965 ft)
- Transmitter coordinates: 44°23′39.2″N 71°39′18.3″W
- Translator: See § Translators
- Repeater: 1230 WMOU (Berlin)

Links
- Public license information: Public file; LMS

WXXS is a contemporary hit radio formatted broadcast radio station licensed to Lancaster, New Hampshire, serving northern New Hampshire and the Northeast Kingdom of Vermont.

== History ==
WXXS has been owned and operated by Barry P. Lunderville since May 1998. In early 2008, Lunderville founded Radio New England Broadcasting, LLC. In August 1997, a construction permit to build a Class A radio station in Lancaster, New Hampshire was obtained. First signing on in late 1997 as WNHT with an adult contemporary/country format at 700 watts, the station soon boosted their power to 1,500 watts. On January 30, 1998, the calls were switched to WXXS. WXXS would later obtain Class C3 status from their previous Class A. Around the time of their power upgrade, WXXS switched to its current CHR/full-service format. From August 2009 to summer 2010 WKDR in Berlin simulcasted WXXS. In the summer of 2010 WKDR became a simulcast of WOTX and currently, WXXS is simulcast on WMOU in Berlin except WXXS does not carry local sports of WMOU and WMOU simulcasts WLTN-FM's morning show.

== Translators ==
In addition to the main station, WXXS is relayed by several translators.

Call sign	Frequency	City of license	FID	ERP (W)	Class	FCC info
W237CR	95.3 FM	Littleton, New Hampshire	147947	5	D	LMS
W294AZ	106.1 FM	Berlin, New Hampshire	155279	175	D	LMS
