= WPNH-FM =

- Plymouth, New Hampshire; United States
- Broadcast area: Lakes Region; White Mountains Region
- Frequency: 100.1 MHz
- Branding: 100.1 The Planet

Programming
- Format: Active rock
- Affiliations: Compass Media Networks

Ownership
- Owner: Northeast Communications Corporation
- Sister stations: WFTN; WFTN-FM; WPNH; WSCY

History
- First air date: October 1, 1975
- Call sign meaning: Plymouth, New Hampshire

Technical information
- Licensing authority: FCC
- Facility ID: 52127
- Class: A
- ERP: 410 watts
- HAAT: 376 meters (1,234 ft)
- Transmitter coordinates: 43.739°N 71.790°W

Links
- Public license information: Public file; LMS
- Website: www.wpnhfm.com

WPNH-FM (100.1 MHz) is a commercial radio station located in Plymouth, New Hampshire. The station identifies itself as "100.1 The Planet" and airs active rock peppered with alternative rock and, more recently, classic rock. The station primarily covers the western Lakes Region and southern White Mountains area, though it can be heard as far south as Manchester and as far west as Barre, Vermont.

WPNH-FM originally transmitted from a hilltop in nearby Holderness until the late 1990s when the station's transmitter was moved to the top of Tenney Mountain in Plymouth by new owners.

In January 2013, soon after another rock station in the area was purchased by new owners who immediately stopped broadcasting the show, WPNH-FM became the Central New Hampshire affiliate for The Free Beer and Hot Wings Show. It replaced the station's previous morning show, the locally produced "Daily Planet" hosted by then-music director Annie Biello and newswoman Amy Bates.

On December 29, 2014, shortly after hiring a new music director, the station began incorporating classic rock into its programming while eliminating most of its classic alternative catalog, but the change was short-lived and WPNH soon began focusing on Active Rock.

The station now primarily broadcasts Westwood One's Rock 2.0 music service, peppering in locally selected music on featured shows like Local Outbreak and Out Of The Box. When the station's format changed in 2025 from Active Rock to Classic Rock, the local feature Punch Out was discontinued after 12 years.

WPNH-FM's sister stations are WFTN and WFTN-FM in Franklin, WSCY in Moultonborough, and WPNH in Plymouth.

The station does not stream its signal over the internet.
