= WAKC =

K-Love radio station in Concord, New Hampshire

- Concord, New Hampshire; United States
- Broadcast area: Manchester–Concord area
- Frequency: 102.3 MHz

Programming
- Format: Contemporary Christian music
- Network: K-Love

Ownership
- Owner: Educational Media Foundation

History
- First air date: February 7, 1972
- Former call signs: WKXL-FM (1972–2000); WOTX-FM (2000–2005); WWHK (2005–2016); WXRG (2016–2021)

Technical information
- Licensing authority: FCC
- Facility ID: 8683
- Class: A
- ERP: 3,000 watts
- HAAT: 87 meters (285 ft)
- Transmitter coordinates: 43°12′57.9″N 71°34′28.6″W

Links
- Public license information: Public file; LMS
- Website: klove.com

Associated station
- WLKC
- Campton, New Hampshire; United States
- Broadcast area: White Mountains–Lakes Region
- Frequency: 105.7 MHz

Ownership
- Owner: Educational Media Foundation

History
- First air date: May 1996
- Former call signs: WVFM (1996–2005); WUSX (2005)

Technical information
- Facility ID: 72211
- Class: A
- ERP: 4,100 watts
- HAAT: 119 meters (390 ft)
- Transmitter coordinates: 43°45′45.3″N 71°38′58.3″W

Links
- Public license information: Public file; LMS

WAKC (102.3 FM) is an American licensed radio station in Concord, New Hampshire. The station is owned by the Educational Media Foundation (EMF) and is part of its K-Love network of contemporary Christian music outlets. EMF also owns WLKC (105.7 FM) in Campton, serving the White Mountains and Lakes Region.

== History ==
=== Early years ===
The station began operations March 7, 1972, as WKXL-FM, the FM sister station to WKXL (1450 AM), under the ownership of Frank Estes, who also owned WKXR in Exeter, New Hampshire. In 1980, Estes sold the WKXL stations to a group of station employees.

=== The Music Zone ===
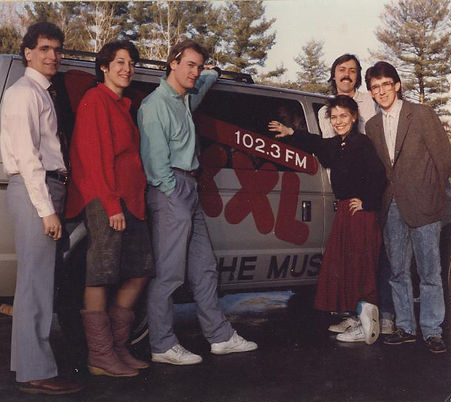
WKXL-FM, 102.3 FM DJs, 1989

The 102.3 FM signal was largely a repeater of the 1450 AM broadcast until 1986 when the owners launched a "light alternative" adult album alternative format. The format was led by Program Director Renee Blake, Production Director Taft Moore, on-air talent including Dave Doud, Julia Figueras, Norm Beeker, and Jay Dreves, and featured artists such as The Cure, Poi Dog Pondering, 10,000 Maniacs, The Pixies, The Call, and U2. The station won recognition, Best of the Best, in 1990 from the National Association of Broadcasters for community service with their This Island Earth promotion that focused on environmental awareness with on-air and "in-field" activities. The Music Zone format continued until 1991 when financial pressures returned the FM signal to a simulcast of the AM's adult contemporary programming. Music programming on the stations ended altogether in 1995, as the adult contemporary format gave way to news, talk, and sports.

=== "Outlaw" country ===
In 1999, the employee group sold the WKXL stations to Vox Media, who, after buying WRCI (107.7 FM) in nearby Hillsborough several months later, shifted the simulcast to that station; as a result, on January 3, 2000, the station returned to separate programming as a country station, WOTX-FM ("Outlaw Country").

=== "The Hawk" ===
In 2004, Vox sold most of its stations in the area to Nassau Broadcasting Partners; however, Nassau could not buy WOTX outright due to Federal Communications Commission (FCC) ownership restrictions. Nassau did take control of the station under a local marketing agreement, and on February 7, 2005, swapped formats with WNHI (93.3 FM) and became a classic rock station as WWHK ("102.3 The Hawk"), in tandem with a nearby Nassau classic rock station, WWHQ (101.5 FM) in Meredith, New Hampshire.

WWHK had planned to drop the classic rock format in favor of sports talk provided by Boston's WEEI in January 2008, but the deal between Nassau and Entercom ended up collapsing. In March 2008, the station shifted from classic rock to a more mainstream rock format.

=== Ownership limbo ===
In September 2006, the FCC ruled that local marketing agreements and joint sales agreements counted towards the operator's ownership count in a market. Initially, Nassau continued to operate WWHK in violation of this ruling as it attempted to obtain a waiver to buy WWHK outright, but the FCC ruled in April 2008 that Nassau had worked with Arbitron to create a Concord radio market, and barred its purchase of WWHK. Four months later, the FCC ordered Nassau to terminate the joint sales agreement with Capitol Broadcasting (the Vox Media subsidiary that continued to hold the WWHK license while Nassau ran the station). Nassau complied, and on August 22, 2008, Vox reassumed control of the station with a commercial-free rock format. The station switched to classical music in September 2008; soon afterwards, the station went silent.

Vox reached a deal to sell WWHK to Andrew Sumereau in 2009. In the interim, Vox returned the station to the air in July, again airing a classic rock loop. WWHK's programming would also include a simulcast of WTPL (the former WRCI and second WKXL-FM). The sale to Sumereau's company, Birch Broadcasting, was finally completed on June 22, 2011; a week earlier, Vox temporarily signed WWHK off once more. Birch returned the station to the air on June 15, 2012 (after an earlier return on June 8 was ended three days later due to the station's tower not being grounded to safely handle lightning strikes). For nearly two years, 24 hours a day, the station aired rock songs performed in classical style by the group known as the Vitamin String Quartet.

=== A "River" in Concord ===
In early 2014, Steven Silberberg's Northeast Broadcasting reached a deal to purchase WWHK from Birch Broadcasting. Northeast took control of the station through a local marketing agreement on April 1; soon thereafter, WWHK began broadcasting commercial-free selections from Andover, Massachusetts, sister station WXRV's "River Music Hall" performances. On May 2, 2014, WWHK began simulcasting WXRV. However, the station broadcast separate news, weather, and advertising. WXRV's programming was already available in portions of the Concord-Lakes Region market through WLKC (105.7 FM) in Campton; WWHK is located between the coverage areas of WXRV and WLKC. The sale to licensee Devon Broadcasting Company, Inc., at a price of $425,000, was consummated on June 19, 2014. On March 28, 2016, WWHK changed its call letters to WXRG.

=== K-Love ===
The Educational Media Foundation (EMF) acquired WXRG and WLKC from Devon Broadcasting Corporation, a subsidiary of Northeast Broadcasting, for $395,000 in 2020, as part of its sale of three New Hampshire FMs to the Christian broadcaster. The call letters in Concord changed to WAKC on January 6, 2021, coincident with the consummation of the sale.

=== WLKC ===
The 105.7 FM facility in Campton signed on in May 1996 as WVFM; under a local marketing agreement, the station was a simulcast of WLKZ, an oldies station in Wolfeboro. Daphne Corcoran's White Mountain Radio sold WVFM to Northeast Broadcasting for $325,000 in 1999; that February, the station shifted to a simulcast of new sister station WXRV.

In June 2005, the call sign was changed to WUSX; that call sign was transferred to a co-owned station in Vermont in September, with 105.7 taking on the WLKC call sign formerly used by another Vermont sister station, WWMP. For a brief time during 2012 and 2013, WLKC was programmed separately (though retaining the "River" branding and AAA format), before returning to the WXRV simulcast.

WLKC was included in EMF's 2020 purchase of three New Hampshire radio stations from Devon Broadcasting.
