= WLNH-FM =

Simulcast of WFNQ, Nashua
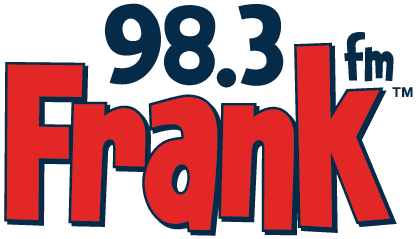
- Laconia, New Hampshire; United States
- Broadcast area: Lakes Region; Concord, New Hampshire
- Frequency: 98.3 MHz (HD Radio)
- Branding: 98.3 Frank FM

Programming
- Format: Classic hits
- Subchannels: HD2: News–talk (WEMJ simulcast)
- Affiliations: New England Patriots Radio Network

Ownership
- Owner: Binnie Media; (WBIN Media Co., Inc.)
- Sister stations: WEMJ; WFNQ; WJYY; WNNH; WNHW; WTPL

History
- First air date: November 22, 1965
- Call sign meaning: Laconia, New Hampshire

Technical information
- Licensing authority: FCC
- Facility ID: 73215
- Class: C3
- ERP: 700 watts
- HAAT: 547 meters (1,795 ft)
- Transmitter coordinates: 43°31′1.3″N 71°22′7.3″W

Links
- Public license information: Public file; LMS
- Webcast: Listen live (via WFNQ)
- Website: frankfmradio.com

WLNH-FM (98.3 MHz) — branded as Frank FM — is a radio station located in Laconia, New Hampshire, United States. The station broadcasts to the Lakes Region and Concord, New Hampshire. The format is classic hits music, and on air it is identified as "The Soundtrack of the Lakes Region". WLNH-FM is owned by Binnie Media.

== History ==
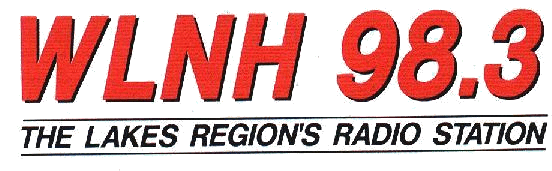
Former logo of the radio station used until December 1998

WLNH was known for its statewide competition, New Hampshire Idol. A smaller version of the highly successful American Idol, NH Idol was a singing competition for residents in New Hampshire aged 16 – 30. The 2006 winner was Jacob Heal, who won the grand prize of having a demo CD produced by Jimmy Landry, an A&R consultant and in-house producer for Virgin Records.

Every December, the WLNH Children's Auction, a nationally registered 501(c)(3) organization, organizes the long-standing WLNH Children's Auction. WLNH is a major contributor to the WLNH Children's Auction. In 2005, WLNH was able to raise $181,000 for the local community. Over the last 25 years, WLNH has brought in over $1 million for the community. The WLNH Children's Auction relies heavily on the community and local organizations for help. Contributors generously gave over 2,300 items in 2005.

WLNH-FM, along with 16 other stations in northern New England formerly owned by Nassau Broadcasting Partners, was purchased at bankruptcy auction by WBIN Media Company, a company controlled by Bill Binnie, on May 22, 2012. Binnie already owned WBIN-TV in Derry and WYCN-LP in Nashua. The deal was completed on November 30, 2012.

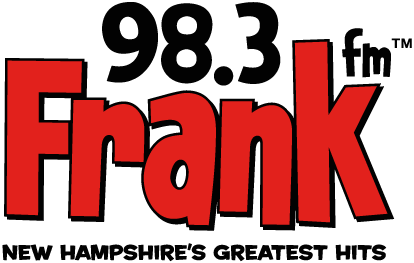
Original version of the "98.3 Frank FM" logo

On May 24, 2019, WLNH-FM changed its format from adult contemporary to classic hits, branded as "Frank FM"; the programming is largely simulcast with Nashua sister station WFNQ, though WLNH breaks away for local commercials and IDs. The "Frank FM" network, which also includes WBYY in Somersworth, transitioned to a hot adult contemporary format during 2021.

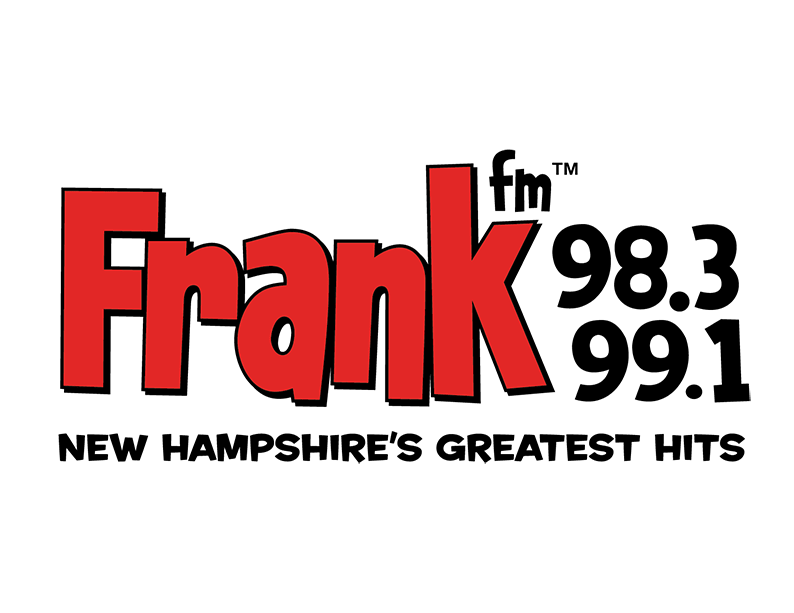
Logo during the simulcast over WNNH between late 2020 and September 2, 2021

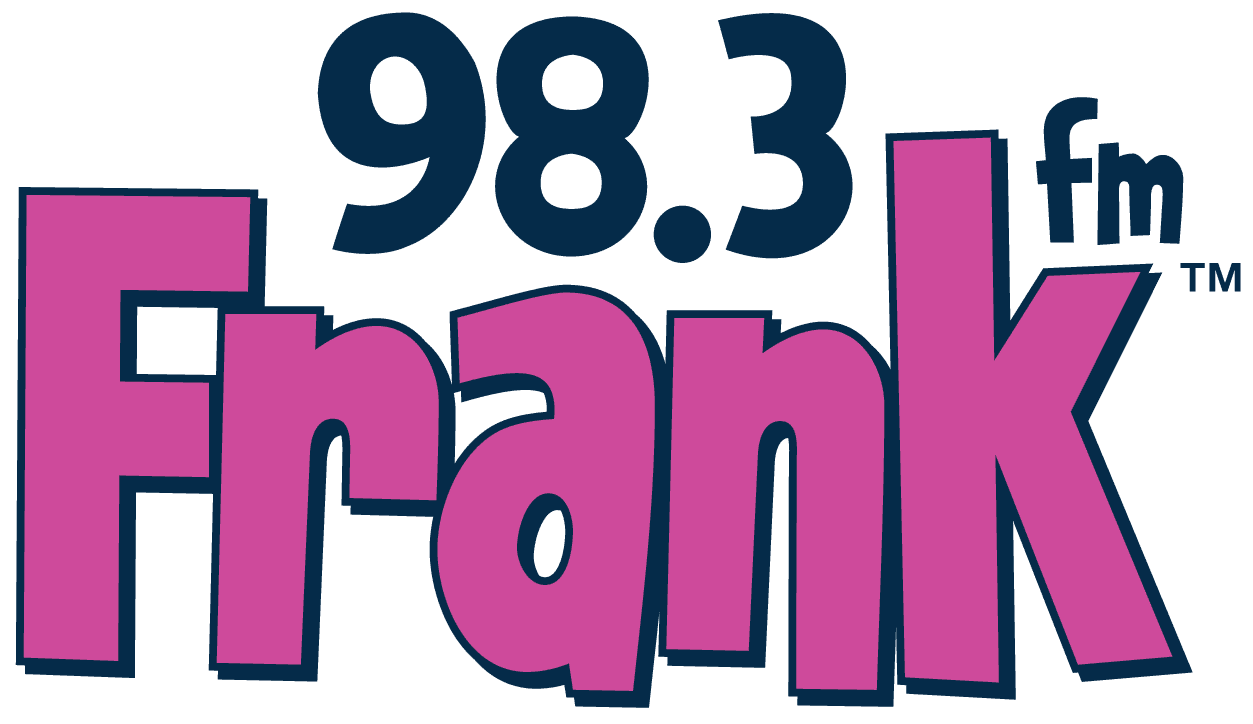
Pink version of the "Frank FM" logo used during the hot AC format

After morning host Marc Nazzaro (who used the air name "DJ Nazzy") was laid off from "Frank FM" in January 2023 as part of a refocus of Binnie Media's resources on its news and talk programming, vice president of programming Heath Cole told the Concord Monitor that "the music format that we do will change". On February 1, 2023, WLNH-FM, along with the rest of the "Frank FM" network, returned to a classic hits format; the stations also dropped their remaining on-air staff, who were reassigned to other positions within the company.
