= WHNM =

- Laconia, New Hampshire; United States
- Broadcast area: Lakes Region
- Frequency: 1350 kHz
- Branding: The Moose 103.3

Programming
- Format: Classic hits

Ownership
- Owner: Patrick Costa; (Costa-Eagle Radio Ventures Limited Partnership)

History
- First air date: August 22, 1922 (as WKAV)
- Former call signs: WKAV (1922–1932); WLNH (1934–1983); WKZU (1983–1985); WMRS (1985–1987); WLNH (1987–1994); WEZS (1994–2023)
- Former frequencies: 1310 kHz (1934–1941); 1340 kHz (1941–1954)
- Call sign meaning: "Moose New Hampshire" (backwards)

Technical information
- Licensing authority: FCC
- Facility ID: 23321
- Class: D
- Power: 5,000 watts day; 112 watts night
- Transmitter coordinates: 43°30′27.3″N 71°30′58.3″W
- Translator: 103.3 W277DJ (Laconia)

Links
- Public license information: Public file; LMS
- Webcast: Listen Live
- Website: themoose1033.com

WHNM (1350 AM) is a broadcast radio station licensed to Laconia, New Hampshire, serving the Lakes Region, including Laconia and Franklin. The station's programming is also carried on FM translator W277DJ (103.3). WHNM is owned by Patrick Costa, through license Costa-Eagle Radio Ventures Limited Partnership.

== History ==
WHNM traces its origins to New Hampshire's first broadcast radio station, WKAV, an experimental station run by a local radio club, which went on the air in 1922 but went dark about a decade later after a myriad of financial problems. In 1934, the station was reborn under a new license as WLNH at 1310 kHz on the AM dial, moving to 1340 in 1941 and to the current 1350 frequency in 1954.

The call letters changed to WKZU in 1983 and WMRS in 1985, before returning to WLNH in 1987 and becoming WEZS in June 1994. As WEZS, the station featured a beautiful music/easy listening format, then smooth jazz. WEZS was a rare AM station to play smooth jazz, along with WCIN in Cincinnati, Ohio.

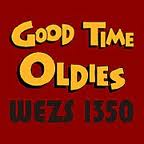
WEZS logo from 2008 to 2012

The station's format changed in March 2008 to "Good Times and Great Oldies", then in December 2012 to full-time news and talk. The programming included syndicated shows hosted by Mark Levin, Tom Sullivan, Dennis Prager, and Dave Ramsey; and hourly news by Fox News Radio.

WEZS began an FM simulcast on translator W277DJ 103.3 in June 2018.

On January 14, 2023, the station changed its call letters to WHNM and its nickname to "The Moose 103.3", with a classic hits format, and on January 25, Gary W. Hammond completed the sale of the station and its translator to Patrick Costa's Costa-Eagle Radio Ventures Limited Partnership for $225,000.
