= WPNH (AM) =

Radio station in Plymouth, New Hampshire

- Plymouth, New Hampshire; United States
- Broadcast area: Lakes Region
- Frequency: 1300 kHz
- Branding: Oldies 92.9

Programming
- Format: Oldies

Ownership
- Owner: Northeast Communications Corp.
- Sister stations: WFTN-FM; WPNH-FM; WSCY

History
- First air date: November 10, 1965
- Call sign meaning: Plymouth, New Hampshire

Technical information
- Licensing authority: FCC
- Facility ID: 52128
- Class: D
- Power: 5,000 watts (day); 88 watts (night)
- Transmitter coordinates: 43°46′32.26″N 71°42′18.29″W
- Translator: 92.9 W225CT (Plymouth)

Links
- Public license information: Public file; LMS

Simulcast
- WFTN
- Franklin, New Hampshire; United States
- Frequency: 1240 kHz

Ownership
- Owner: Northeast Communications Corp.

History
- First air date: October 30, 1966
- Call sign meaning: Franklin, Tilton, Northfield

Technical information
- Facility ID: 49391
- Class: C
- Power: 1,000 watts unlimited
- Transmitter coordinates: 43°27′16.27″N 71°38′31.28″W
- Translator: 92.9 W225CB (Tilton)

Links
- Public license information: Public file; LMS

WPNH (1300 AM) and WFTN (1240 AM) are commercial radio stations in Central New Hampshire. WPNH is licensed to Plymouth, and WFTN is licensed to Franklin. The stations are branded as "Oldies 92.9" and simulcast an oldies format, featuring an unusually deep and vast playlist offering the first generation of rock and roll of the 1960s. WPNH and WFTN also offer select hits from the late 1950s and the early to mid 1970s. The stations also carry Boston Red Sox during the baseball season. The studios are in Franklin, along with co-owned WPNH-FM, WFTN-FM and WSCY. Prior to the addition of both of their 92.9 FM translators, WFTN and WPNH featured programming from Westwood One's "America's Best Music" adult standards format.

WPNH is a Class D station with 5,000 watts days and 88 watts at night, non directional while WFTN is a Class C station with 1,000 watts 24 hours a day. The stations also can be heard on FM via two translators, both at 92.9 MHz: W225CB in Tilton, New Hampshire (relaying WFTN), and W225CT in Plymouth, New Hampshire (relaying WPNH). The "Oldies 92.9" branding is derived from the translators' frequency. The stations do not stream their programming over the internet.

== Translators ==
Call sign	Frequency	City of license	FID	ERP (W)	Class	Transmitter coordinates	FCC info	Notes
W225CB	92.9 FM	Tilton, New Hampshire	138049	250	D	43°28′24.2″N 71°36′21.2″W	LMS	Relays WFTN
W225CT	92.9 FM	Plymouth, New Hampshire	201041	40	D	43°44′21.2″N 71°47′24.2″W	LMS	Relays WPNH
