= WFTN-FM =

- Franklin, New Hampshire; United States
- Broadcast area: Lakes Region
- Frequency: 94.1 MHz
- Branding: Mix 94.1 FM

Programming
- Format: Top 40/CHR

Ownership
- Owner: Northeast Communications Corporation
- Sister stations: WFTN; WPNH; WPNH-FM; WSCY

History
- First air date: April 10, 1987
- Call sign meaning: Franklin, Tilton, Northfield

Technical information
- Licensing authority: FCC
- Facility ID: 49390
- Class: A
- ERP: 6,000 watts
- HAAT: 100 meters (330 ft)
- Transmitter coordinates: 43.473°N 71.605°W

Links
- Public license information: Public file; LMS
- Webcast: Listen live
- Website: www.mix941fm.com

WFTN-FM (Mix 94.1 FM) is a radio station based in central New Hampshire which airs a CHR music format. Broadcasting with 6,000 watts from Calef Hill in Tilton, the station's signal is perfectly situated to cover Central New Hampshire, including the cities of Laconia, Concord, and Franklin and nearby communities. Mix 94.1 FM is the heritage CHR in both the Lake Winnipesaukee Region and Concord areas, being one of the few stations in New Hampshire staffed with live and local air personalities during the day.

The station is owned by Northeast Communications, a local broadcasting company owned by Jeff Fisher. Sister stations to WFTN-FM are WFTN (AM), WPNH AM–FM, and WSCY.

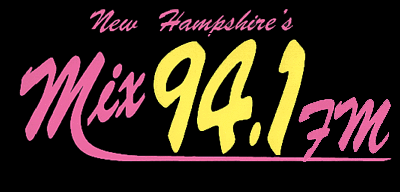
Former logo used from May 11, 2000 through April 8, 2003

WFTN-FM signed on the air in 1987 as an adult contemporary station, "94 FM". Over the years, the station evolved into a CHR station. Longtime Mix 94.1 air personalities include Fred Caruso and news director Amy Bates, Tara Madison, "Mower", Pat Kelly, and weekends with Gary Ford and Gavin Martin. Mix 94.1 FM is the local affiliate for Liveline with Mason Kelter on weeknights and Open House Party on Sunday night which they have carried since 1990.

The station streams its signal over the internet, as of December 2022.
