= William Binnie (businessman) =

American industrialist and investment banker

Bill Binnie

Personal details
- Born: William Harrison Binnie; February 2, 1958 (age 68) Scotland, United Kingdom
- Party: Republican
- Education: Harvard University (BA, MBA)
- Website: Campaign website

William Harrison "Bill" Binnie is an American industrialist, investment banker, and philanthropist, who is currently president of the Carlisle Capital Corporation, president of the media company New Hampshire 1 Network and owner of Carlisle One Media. He is the former chairman of the Finance Committee for the New Hampshire Republican State Committee, and a former candidate for the Republican nomination for the U. S. Senate in 2010. He served as chairman of Carlisle Plastics, Inc. until that firm was sold to Tyco International in September 1996.

== Education ==
Binnie was born in Scotland and immigrated to the United States at the age of five. He attended Harvard University on a scholarship. As a student, he was a research fellow for the Accounting Review, a journal on finance and accounting. Upon graduation, he attended Harvard Business School, where he served as president of the Management Consulting Club. After graduation, he took a position as a consultant at McKinsey & Co.

== Business career ==
Fresh out of graduation from Harvard, Binnie began to make a name for himself by buying and selling companies in collaboration with a wealthy investor for whom he had been doing financial research.

Binnie acquired the assets of Polytech, a Minneapolis, Minnesota–based manufacturer of household and commercial plastics, including food storage bags and wraps, trash bags, and plastic sheeting. Polytech made the "Ruffies" brand trash bag which actor/comedian Jonathan Winters helped to make famous. Binnie also acquired American Western, a Sioux Falls, South Dakota–based private label manufacturer of similar products, along with four other plastics manufacturers that included a line of coat hangers. He consolidated the six companies into Carlisle Plastics, Inc., building a large corporation, employing thousands of workers. He was chairman of the board from 1985 onwards and chief executive officer and President from 1985 to 1994. By 1996, he owned 62.5% of Carlisle's Class B shares making him the majority owner.

By the early 1990s, he was one of the youngest CEOs in New York Stock Exchange history and was featured in Forbes Magazine as a "whirlwind of a manager." Carlisle Plastics was voted one of Walmart's "Vendors of the Year". During his tenure, the firm opened facilities in the United States, Europe, Latin America and Asia.

In September 1996, he sold his controlling interest to Tyco International.

Binnie is currently the president of Carlisle Capital Corporation, a New Hampshire investment and venture capital company. "Current estimates show this company has an annual revenue of $2.5 to 5 million and employs a staff of approximately 5 to 9," according to the tracking site Manta.com in 2009.

He currently owns the Wentworth By The Sea Country Club in Rye, once part of the Wentworth by the Sea Hotel in New Castle.

In 2010, he formed New Hampshire 1 Network and, in 2011, he founded Carlisle One Media, acquiring television station WZMY for $9.25 million and renaming it WBIN. By late 2011, he had tripled the number of employees at the station, recruiting from CBS, ESPN, and local competitor WMUR. Also purchased were Vermont television stations WVBK and WVBQ and Nashua station WYCN.

Binnie has partnered with Jeff Shapiro in a bid for Nassau Broadcasting's radio stations in Northern New England, subject to bankruptcy judge and FCC approval.

In 2017, WBIN-TV announced that it had sold its television broadcast rights for $68.1 million. WBIN-TV also entered into a channel-sharing sale of its remaining television license rights with a major television group. While the final sale figures were undisclosed, it is estimated that in total the station sold for nearly $100 million, nearly $90 million more than the $9.25 million originally paid by Binnie.

Binnie is additionally involved in the revitalization of historic downtown Manchester buildings including the former Citizen's Bank Building on Elm Street and three buildings in Manchester's mill yard.

== Racing career ==
Bill Binnie
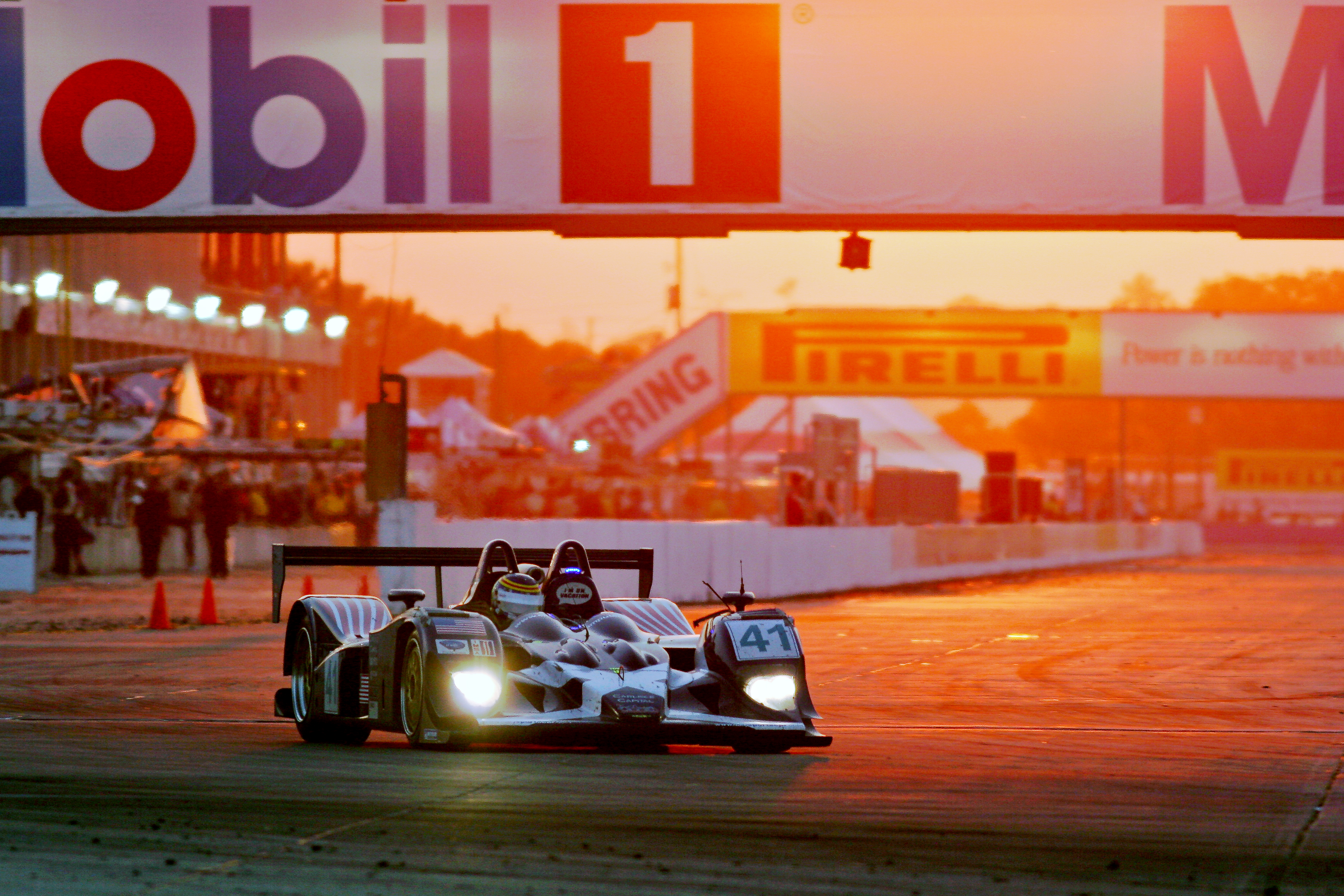
- Binnie's Lola at Sebring 2006
- Nationality: (United States) American (Scotland) Scottish
- Categorisation: FIA Silver (until 2013); FIA Bronze (2014–2019)

24 Hours of Le Mans career
- Years: 2004–2007
- Teams: Intersport Racing, Rachel Welter, Binnie Motorsports
- Best finish: 13th (2006)
- Class wins: 1

A lifetime driver and mechanic, Binnie drove for Lotus before forming Binnie Motorsports. He was a two-time class winner of the 24 Hours of Le Mans, twice as a driver and once as a team owner. He won the ALMS Petite Le Mans Road Atlanta in Georgia, as well as the 12 hours of Sebring. In 2012, he drove for James Watt Automotive's JWA-Avila team.

=== 24 Hours of Le Mans results ===
Year	Team	Co-Drivers	Car	Class	Laps	Pos.	Class Pos.
2004	(United States) Intersport Racing	(United States) Clint Field (United States) Rick Sutherland	Lola B2K/40-Judd	LMP2	278	25th	1st
2005	(France) Rachel Welter	(Japan) Yojiro Terada (France) Patrice Roussel	WR LMP04-Peugeot	LMP2	233	NC	NC
2006	(United States) Binnie Motorsports	(Japan) Yojiro Terada (United Kingdom) Allen Timpany	Lola B05/42-Zytek	LMP2	326	13th	2nd
2007	(United States) Binnie Motorsports	(United Kingdom) Allen Timpany (United Kingdom) Chris Buncombe	Lola B05/42-Zytek	LMP2	318	18th	1st

== Philanthropy ==
Binnie's extensive charity work in New Hampshire includes donations to expand the "End 68 Hours of Hunger" program into Nashua, New Hampshire. "End 68 Hours of Hunger" helps fight food-insecurity for children that rely on school breakfasts and lunch by providing them meals over the weekend as well.

In May 2015, Binnie won an award from the New Hampshire Preservation Alliance for his "rehabilitation and adaptive use" of the historic Walker School Building in Concord, New Hampshire, the site of the ratification of the U.S. Constitution. Which "created a broadcast center for the state capital."

In 2017, Binnie offered to pay the college tuition for a fifth-grader who told him that she did not plan to attend college. After donating $20,000 for technology upgrades at Smyth Road School in Manchester, New Hampshire, Binnie visited the fifth-grade class and asked all the students to raise their hands if they planned to attend college. When only one student did not raise her hand, Binnie pledged to do whatever he could to get the girl to college, including paying her tuition. Binnie said of the girl, "I think she reminded me of me, a little 10-year-old ... who didn't have many expectations of going to college, I hope the best for that little girl. More important, I want her to be ambitious."

Additionally, the Smyth Road Elementary School library was renamed the Bill Binnie Media Center.

Although a moderate Republican, Binnie and his wife have made political contributions to a variety of political causes and candidates. During his time as Chairman of the Finance Committee for the New Hampshire Republican State Committee, Binnie contributed tens of thousands of dollars to the state party. However, the frequency of his donations to Democratic candidates in the past drew criticisms from conservative groups during his candidacy in the 2010 Republican primary for the U.S. Senate.

== Candidacy for United States Senate ==
Binnie ran for the Republican nomination in the United States Senate election in New Hampshire, 2010. The primary was held on September 14, 2010. Binnie ran for the Republican nomination against Hollis businessman Jim Bender, former State Board of Education chair Ovide Lamontagne, and former state Attorney General Kelly Ayotte, who won the primary contest and went on to win the election.

Binnie had announced his candidacy in November 2009, stating that his political beliefs were modeled after the former president Ronald Reagan's vision of a limited government that fostered economic growth. Individuals working on his campaign included Republican consultant Arthur J. Finkelstein, based in New York, former NHGOP executive director Paul Collins, and Sheri M. Keniston, formerly a congressional staffer for John E. Sununu.

During the campaign, Binnie faced criticism from multiple news organizations and opponents for closing A&E Plastics in Santa Ana, California, laying off 450 American workers and then transferring production seven miles away in Tijuana, Mexico.

During the 2010 Senate run Binnie claimed his pro-choice view on abortion attracted death threats from radical anti-abortion terrorists, both against Binnie himself and against his elderly father of the same name, but local police said they were not investigating any death threats, according to the Concord Monitor. Other acts against Binnie and his family included vandalism of his daughter's car, which she blamed on a police officer, and threatening and harassing phone calls and postal mail.

In December 2021, Binnie confirmed that he is "actively considering running for U.S. Senate" again.
