= Boston Red Sox Radio Network =

Professional baseball radio broadcast network

- Type: Radio network
- Country: United States
- Broadcast area: Massachusetts; Maine; Connecticut; Rhode Island; Vermont; New Hampshire; New York (limited)
- Headquarters: Boston, Massachusetts

Ownership
- Owner: Boston Red Sox; Audacy, Inc.

Coverage
- Affiliates: 54, including 1 flagship

Links
- Website: audacy.com/weei/shows/red-sox-baseball

The Boston Red Sox Radio Network is an American radio network composed of 54 radio stations which carry English language coverage of the Boston Red Sox, a professional baseball team in Major League Baseball (MLB). Lawrence, Massachusetts station WEEI-FM (93.7 FM), which serves Boston and the Greater Boston area, serves as the network's Flagship. The network also includes 49 affiliates in the U.S. states of Massachusetts, Maine, Connecticut, Rhode Island, Vermont, New Hampshire and New York: 28 AM stations, 24 of which supplement their signals with one or more FM translators; and 21 full-power FM stations, one of which supplements its signal with several FM translators. In 2025, Will Flemming succeeded the network's longstanding play-by-play announcer, Joe Castiglione. In addition to traditional over-the-air AM and FM broadcasts, network programming airs on SiriusXM satellite radio; and streams online via SiriusXM Internet Radio, TuneIn Premium, and MLB.com Gameday Audio.

Shaw's and Star Market Supermarkets, a grocery store chain which serves much of New England, holds naming rights to the "WEEI Shaw's and Star Market Red Sox Radio Network," rebranded in 2022 as the "WEEI Shaw's and Star Market Red Sox Network."

== Programming ==
Play-by-play announcer Will Flemming calls games on-site, in addition to a rotation of Sean McDonough as the second play-by-play announcer, with Will Middlebrooks, Lenny DiNardo or Rob Bradford as color commentators for select games. WEEI-FM personality Christian Arcand serves as pre- and post-game host during weekdays, and Joe Weil and Cooper Boardman serve as the pre- and post-game host during weekends. All regular season and many spring training games are broadcast.

== Station list ==
Network stations as of the 2024 Red Sox season
City/market	State	Station	Frequency	Network status
Greenwich	Connecticut	WGCH	1490 AM	Affiliate
Hartford	Connecticut	WTIC	1080 AM	Affiliate
Putnam	Connecticut	WINY	1350 AM	Affiliate
Putnam	Connecticut	W246DN	97.1 FM	WINY relay
Willimantic	Connecticut	WILI	1400 AM	Affiliate
Willimantic	Connecticut	W237EL	95.3 FM	WILI relay
Bangor	Maine	WEZQ-FM	92.9 FM	Affiliate
Calais	Maine	WQDY-FM	92.7 FM	Affiliate
Dover-Foxcroft	Maine	WZLO	103.1 FM	Affiliate
Ellsworth	Maine	WDEA	1370 AM	Affiliate
Farmington	Maine	WKTJ-FM	99.3 FM	Affiliate
Gray	Maine	WJJB-FM	96.3 FM	Affiliate
Islesboro	Maine	WBYA	105.5 FM	Affiliate
Machias	Maine	WALZ	95.3 FM	Affiliate
Millinocket	Maine	WSYY	1240 AM	Affiliate
Millinocket	Maine	W273DJ	102.5 FM	WSYY relay
Portland	Maine	WRED	1440 AM	Affiliate
Presque Isle	Maine	WOZI	101.9 FM	Affiliate
Saco	Maine	WPEI	95.9 FM	Affiliate
Dennis	Massachusetts	WEII	96.3 FM	Affiliate
Easthampton	Massachusetts	WWEI	105.5 FM	Affiliate
Fitchburg	Massachusetts	WPKZ	1280 AM	Affiliate
Fitchburg	Massachusetts	W287BT	105.3 FM	WPKZ relay
Great Barrington	Massachusetts	WSBS	860 AM	Affiliate
Great Barrington	Massachusetts	W231AK	94.1 FM	WSBS relay
Lawrence	Massachusetts	WEEI-FM	93.7 FM	Flagship
Milford	Massachusetts	WMRC	1490 AM	Affiliate
Milford	Massachusetts	W267CD	101.3 FM	WMRC relay
North Adams	Massachusetts	WNAW	1230 AM	Affiliate
North Adams	Massachusetts	W234DD	94.7 FM	WNAW relay
Pittsfield	Massachusetts	WBEC	1420 AM	Affiliate
Pittsfield	Massachusetts	W230CP	93.9 FM	WBEC relay
Worcester	Massachusetts	WVEI	1440 AM	Affiliate
Berlin	New Hampshire	WMOU	1230 AM	Affiliate
Berlin	New Hampshire	W300DN	107.9 FM	WMOU relay
Claremont	New Hampshire	WTSV	1230 AM	Affiliate
Claremont	New Hampshire	W232DN	94.3 FM	WTSV relay
Claremont	New Hampshire	W234BN	94.7 FM	WCNL relay
Dover	New Hampshire	WTSN	1270 AM	Affiliate
Dover	New Hampshire	W251CF	98.1 FM	WTSN relay
Hillsborough	New Hampshire	WTPL	107.7 FM	Affiliate
Littleton	New Hampshire	WLTN	1400 AM	Affiliate
Littleton	New Hampshire	WMTK	106.3 FM	Affiliate
Littleton	New Hampshire	W253AY	98.5 FM	WLTN relay
Littleton	New Hampshire	W278CS	107.5 FM	WLTN relay
New London	New Hampshire	WNTK-FM	99.7 FM	Affiliate
Newport	New Hampshire	WCNL	1010 AM	Affiliate
Plymouth	New Hampshire	WPNH-FM	100.1 FM	Affiliate
Keene	New Hampshire	WZBK	1220 AM	Affliiate
Keene	New Hampshire	W272DZ	102.3 FM	WZBK relay
Albany	New York	W240EC	95.9 FM	WOFX relay
Plattsburgh	New York	WEAV	960 AM	Affiliate
Plattsburgh	New York	W290AT	105.9 FM	WEAV relay
Troy	New York	WOFX	980 AM	Affiliate
Providence	Rhode Island	WWBB	101.5 FM	Affiliate
Barre	Vermont	W243AT	96.5 FM	WDEV-FM relay
Brattleboro	Vermont	WKVT	92.7 FM	Affiliate
Colchester	Vermont	W246DT	97.1 FM	WEAV relay
Island Pond	Vermont	W270BR	101.9 FM	WDEV-FM relay
Morrisville	Vermont	WLVB	93.9 FM	Affiliate
Montpelier	Vermont	W252CU	98.3 FM	WDEV-FM relay
Newport	Vermont	WIKE	1490 AM	Affiliate
Newport	Vermont	W276DK	103.1 FM	WIKE relay
Randolph	Vermont	WCVR	1320 AM	Affiliate
Randolph	Vermont	W261DJ	100.1 FM	WCVR relay
Rutland	Vermont	WSYB	1380 AM	Affiliate
Rutland	Vermont	W261DE	100.1 FM	WSYB relay
Springfield	Vermont	WCFR	1480 AM	Affiliate
Springfield	Vermont	W293BH	106.5 FM	WCFR relay
St. Johnsbury	Vermont	WSTJ	1340 AM	Affiliate
St. Johnsbury	Vermont	W281CC	104.1 FM	WSTJ relay
Warren	Vermont	WDEV-FM	96.1 FM	Affiliate
Waterbury	Vermont	WDEV	550 AM	Affiliate
White River Junction	Vermont	W233CC	94.5 FM	WTSV relay
Woodstock	Vermont	WWOD	93.9 FM	Affiliate

=== Network map ===
Boston Red Sox Radio Network stations. Click on each marker to reveal details.; Flagship station; Affiliates (including translators)

== Spanish Beisbol Network ==
In addition to the English-language network, the Boston Red Sox Spanish Beisbol Network is a five-station network carrying Spanish-language coverage of the Red Sox. Haverhill station WCCM (1490 AM) serves as the network's flagship; each affiliate simulcasts over an FM translator. Nilson Pepén is the play-by-play announcer.

City/market	State	Station	Frequency	Network status
Hartford	Connecticut	WLAT	910 AM	Affiliate
New Britain	Connecticut	W269DE	101.7 FM	WLAT relay
Dedham	Massachusetts	WAMG	890 AM	Affiliate
Dedham	Massachusetts	W235CS	94.9 FM	WAMG relay
Haverhill	Massachusetts	WCCM	1490 AM	Flagship
Haverhill	Massachusetts	W279DH	103.7 FM	WCCM relay
Methuen	Massachusetts	WUBG	1570 AM	Affiliate
Methuen	Massachusetts	W287CW	105.3 FM	WUBG relay
Lawrence	Massachusetts	WLLH	1400 AM	Affiliate
Lowell	Massachusetts	W236CU	95.1 FM	WLLH relay
Worcester	Massachusetts	WORC	1310 AM	Affiliate
Worcester	Massachusetts	W291DB	106.1 FM	WORC relay

The table above was current as of the 2023 Red Sox season. In 2026, WCCM and WESX (1230 in Nahant, Massachusetts) are the only Spanish-language stations listed on the club website.

== History ==
=== Former announcers ===
- Ken Coleman
- Bob Starr
- Jerry Trupiano
- Dave O'Brien
- Glenn Geffner
- Dale Arnold
- Jon Rish
- Tim Neverett
- Mario Impemba
- Josh Lewin
- Chris Berman
- Sean Grande
- Jon Miller
- Jim Woods
- Ned Martin
- Dave Martin
- John MacLean
- Johnny Pesky
- Mel Parnell
- Curt Gowdy
- Art Gleeson
- Bill Crowley
- Bob Murphy
- Don Gillis
- Tom Hussey
- Bob Delaney
- Leo Egan
- George Hartrick
- Frankie Frisch
- Fred Hoey
- John Shepard III
- Gus Rooney
- Gerry Harrison

== See also ==
- List of XM Satellite Radio channels
- List of Sirius Satellite Radio stations
- List of Boston Red Sox broadcasters
