= WGIR =

WGIR may refer to:

- WGIR (AM), a radio station (610 AM) licensed to Manchester, New Hampshire, United States
- WGIR-FM, a radio station (101.1 FM) licensed to Manchester, New Hampshire, United States
