= Wildcat Sports Radio Network =

Collegiate sports radio network

The UNH Wildcat Sports Radio Network is an American radio network that carries New Hampshire Wildcats sports, the athletic division of the University of New Hampshire.

It covers college football, basketball and ice hockey.

== Stations ==
=== Flagship ===
- WGIR 610 AM Manchester
- WQSO 96.7 FM Rochester
- WPKX 930 AM Rochester

=== Affiliate stations ===
- WNTK-FM 99.7 FM New London
- WCNL AM 1010 New London
- WUVR AM 1490 Lebanon
- WASR AM 1420 Wolfeboro

== Former stations ==
- WFEA 1370 AM Manchester
- WTSN Dover, former flagship
