= WCFR =

Coordinates: 43°16′54″N 72°29′21″W

- Springfield, Vermont; United States
- Frequency: 1480 AM

Programming
- Format: Classic hits
- Affiliations: Red Sox Radio Network; Boston Bruins Radio Network

Ownership
- Owner: Robert Landry and John Landry; (Sugar River Media, LLC)
- Sister stations: WCNL; WCVR; WNTK-FM; WUVR

History
- First air date: 1954
- Former call signs: WNIX (1954–1957); WCFR (1957–1998); WNBX (1998–2005)
- Call sign meaning: Carlo, Frank, and Ruth (Zezza)

Technical information
- Licensing authority: FCC
- Facility ID: 4909
- Class: B
- Power: 5,000 watts day; 23 watts night
- Translator: 106.5 W293BH (Springfield)

Links
- Public license information: Public file; LMS
- Webcast: Listen live
- Website: www.wcfram1480.com

WCFR is an AM radio station licensed to Springfield, Vermont. It broadcasts a classic hits format with 5,000 watts during the day. Programming is also simulcast on translator W293BH, 106.5 FM. The station carries Boston Red Sox baseball from the Red Sox Radio Network, and the Boston Bruins Radio Network.

== History ==
WCFR was started in 1954 as WNIX. It was purchased by Vermont broadcasting legend Carlos Zezza in the 1950s, renaming the station for the first initials of Zezza's three children in 1957. WCFR enjoyed many years as a successful music station.

Zezza sold WCFR to Sconnix in 1974, who changed the format from Top-40 to adult contemporary. Zezza's son Frank led a group that purchased the station back from Sconnix in the early 1980s. By this time, WCFR's popularity waned in favor of its FM sister station, WCFR-FM.

The 1990s saw several changes in ownership and WCFR carried various formats through the decade. In September 1998, WCFR changed from adult standards to a business news format. Two months later, the station was leased to Brian Dodge, at which point the station switched to a simulcast of the religious format of his (never actually licensed) WWNH in Madbury, New Hampshire, under the WNBX callsign. Dodge left the station in 2000 after being charged with domestic assault, leaving WNBX silent until new operators could be found.

Bob Vinikoor bought the station in 2001 and switched it to a simulcast of established FM talk station WNTK-FM. The format was switched to oldies in 2003 and the WCFR call letters returned in 2005. WCFR switched to classic hits in 2007 and to adult contemporary in 2009.

On February 3, 2017, WFCR and its FM translator W293BH 106.5 FM were sold to Sugar River Media LLC. The station was re-branded to The All-New Rewind 106.5/1480 WCFR.

Former sister station WCFR-FM on 93.5 was sold separately from the AM WCFR in 2001 and was moved to Swanzey, New Hampshire, in 2008 (it is now WEEY). WFYX was known as WCFR-FM until owner Nassau Broadcasting, which at one point had planned to sell WPLY in Mount Pocono, Pennsylvania, parked the WPLY-FM call letters on 96.3 in Walpole, New Hampshire.
