= WTSJ =

WTSJ may refer to:

- WTSJ-LD, a low-power television station (channel 26, virtual 38) licensed to serve Milwaukee, Wisconsin, United States
- WCVR, a radio station (1320 AM) licensed to serve Randolph, Vermont, United States, which held the call sign WTSJ from 2006 to 2010
