= 99 Rock =

99 Rock may refer to several different radio stations in the United States:

- WPLR in Connecticut
- WKSM in Florida
- WFRD in New Hampshire
