= WMYF (Portsmouth, New Hampshire) =

- Final logo as "Classic Country 1380"
- Portsmouth, New Hampshire; United States
- Broadcast area: Seacoast Region
- Frequency: 1380 kHz

Ownership
- Owner: iHeartMedia; (Capstar TX, LLC)
- Sister stations: WERZ; WHEB; WPKX; WQSO; WTBU

History
- First air date: December 5, 1960 (as WBBX)
- Last air date: December 9, 2015
- Former call signs: WBBX (1960–1985); WAVI (1985–1987); WQMI (1987–1989); WCQL (1989–1995); WTMN (1995–1998); WMYF (1998–2016); WMGE (2016; unused on air); WPLA (2016–2017; unused on air)

Technical information
- Facility ID: 35217
- Class: B
- Power: 1,000 watts
- Transmitter coordinates: 43°3′48.3″N 70°47′7.2″W

WMYF (1380 AM) was the call sign assigned from 1998 to 2016, and the last call sign used on the air, for radio station WPLA in Portsmouth, New Hampshire, United States. The station, which was established in 1960 as WBBX and operated until 2015, served the Seacoast Region. The station was last owned by iHeartMedia. Following call sign changes to WMGE and WPLA—both transferred from other iHeartMedia stations, and never used on the air—the station's license was canceled in June 2017.

== History ==
Seacoast Broadcasting Corporation was granted a construction permit for a new station on 1380 kHz in Portsmouth, New Hampshire, on June 15, 1960, and was assigned the call sign WBBX on June 27. WBBX went on the air December 5, 1960. The station affiliated with ABC Radio in April 1963; in January 1965, WBBX became part of the New Hampshire State Network, which also included WKBK in Keene, WEMJ in Laconia, and WFEA in Manchester.

Sportscaster Curt Gowdy bought WBBX for $316,000 in 1969, adding it to a broadcast group that already included WCCM AM-FM in Lawrence, Massachusetts; KOWB in Laramie, Wyoming; and a minority interest in KFBC AM-TV in Cheyenne, Wyoming, KSTF in Scottsbluff, Nebraska, and KTVS in Sterling, Colorado. Under Gowdy, the station programmed contemporary music, with national news supplied by ABC's Information network. Gowdy sold WBBX to J. Harrison Holman's Kressman Broadcasting for $590,000 in 1977; Kressman, in turn, sold it to Earl and Lois Goldstein's Seacoast Broadcasting Company three years later in a $550,000 deal. By 1983, WBBX had moved to an adult contemporary format, with news now being supplied by ABC's Contemporary network.

The Goldsteins sold WBBX to Portsmouth Broadcasting Corporation for $485,000 in 1985; principals David and Robert Sassler owned WARE in Ware, Massachusetts. The new owners changed the call sign to WAVI on May 17, 1985, and moved the station to an oldies format; its network affiliation shifted to the ABC Direction Network.

WAVI was silent by 1987, when Ware Communications—by this point owned by Richard L. Sadowsky, who also held a stake in the Precht Communications television station group—sold the station to Windward Communications for $325,000; principal Richard Walsh owned WQMI in York Center, Maine; WQZN and WABK-FM in Gardiner, Maine; and WPNH AM-FM in Plymouth. Windward changed the call sign to WQMI on July 23, 1987, again programming an oldies format. WQMI and WQMI-FM were sold to Sunshine Group Broadcasting, owner of WGAN and WMGX in Portland, Maine; WFEA and WZID in Manchester; and WIXY and WAQY in Springfield, Massachusetts, for $3.1 million in 1989; Sunshine renamed the station WCQL on March 13, 1989, with oldies being supplemented with NBC Talknet programming. Talk programming was dropped in October 1991 in favor of a full-time simulcast of WCQL-FM's oldies programming; in January 1992, the station broke from this simulcast to become a sports radio station. That November, WCQL and WCQL-FM turned their ad sales over to WZNN and WWEM, effectively becoming part of a five-station group in the Portsmouth market that also included the newly launched WXBB.

WMYF's logo under "The Greatest Music Ever Made" branding

Sunshine Group Broadcasting sold WCQL and WCQL-FM to Knight Quality Stations for $16 million in 1994; the deal added the stations to an eight-station group that included WHEB in Portsmouth. Knight changed WCQL's call sign to WTMN on February 19, 1995. Knight Quality Stations announced the sale of its eight New England radio stations, including WTMN, to Capstar Broadcasting Partners in April 1997; upon assuming control in January 1998, the stations were operated by Capstar's Atlantic Star Communications subsidiary. Capstar replaced WTMN's One-on-One Sports programming with Christmas music in December 1998, as part of a transition to the adult standards programming that had recently been dropped by WMYF (1540 AM); the WMYF call sign, for "Music of Your Life", moved to this station on December 1.

Capstar and Chancellor Media announced in August 1998 that they would merge (Hicks, Muse, Tate & Furst was a major shareholder in both companies); upon the merger's completion in July 1999, the combined company was named AMFM Inc. AMFM was in turn acquired by Clear Channel Communications (forerunner to iHeartMedia) in a deal announced on October 4, 1999, and completed in August 2000.

On November 22, 2010, WMYF changed its format from adult standards to sports, branded as "The Sports Animal" and featuring ESPN Radio programming. WMYF's lineup also included Portland Sea Dogs baseball games. As of October 1, 2013, WMYF had returned to a standards format, with sports programming continuing on sister station WPKX (the former WZNN); by 2015, the station was playing classic country music.

WMYF went silent on December 9, 2015, after losing its transmitter site. The station's programming continued to be available online at its website.

The call sign was changed to WMGE on September 16, 2016, taking on the former call sign of an iHeart station in Miami, and to WPLA on December 14, 2016, swapping with a sister station in Georgia. On May 17, 2017, the Federal Communications Commission informed WPLA that it was in the process of cancelling the station's license for not returning to the air within a year of going silent; the license was canceled on June 29, 2017. The closure of the station, following the 1991 shutdown of WHEB (750 AM), left the city of Portsmouth without any AM radio stations.
