= WPKX =

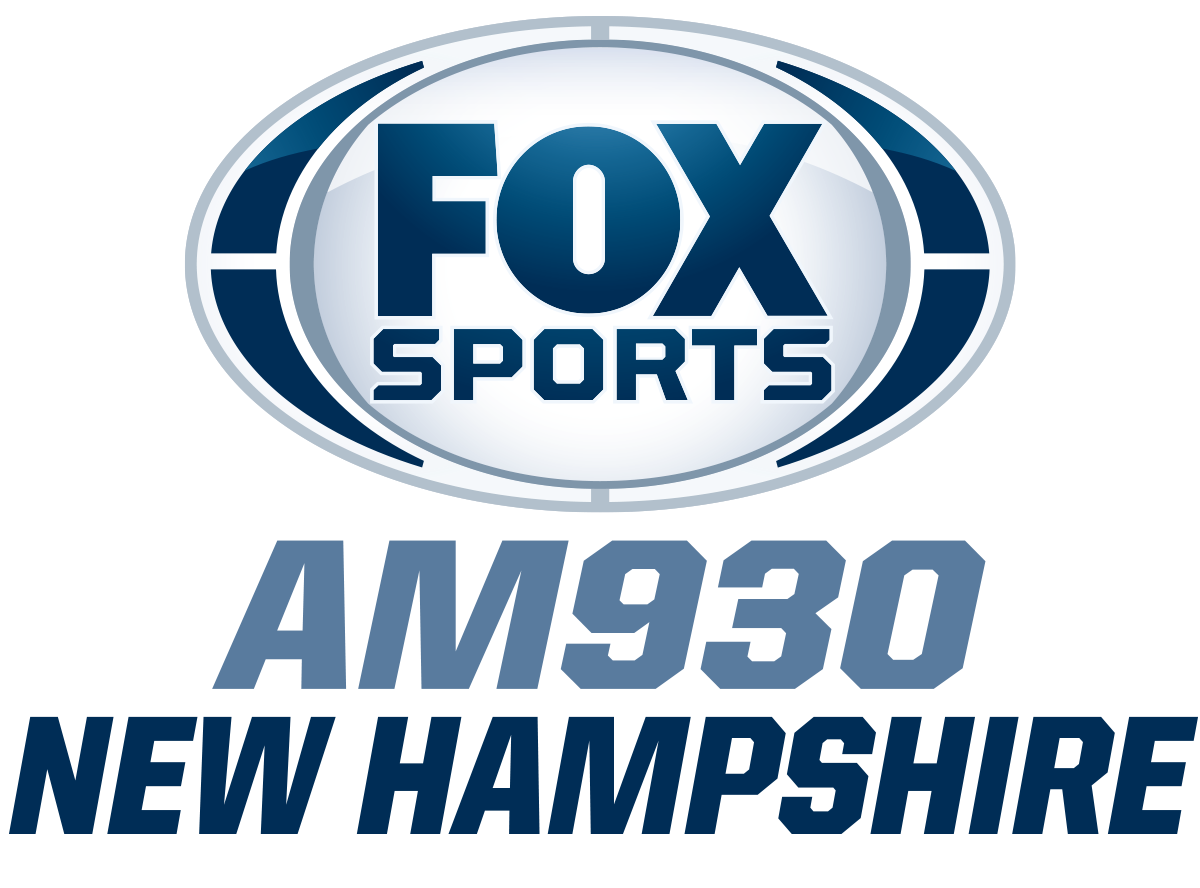
- Rochester, New Hampshire; United States
- Broadcast area: Seacoast Region
- Frequency: 930 kHz
- Branding: Fox Sports 930

Programming
- Format: Sports
- Affiliations: Fox Sports Radio

Ownership
- Owner: iHeartMedia, Inc.; (iHM Licenses, LLC)
- Sister stations: WERZ; WHEB; WQSO; WTBU

History
- First air date: 1947 (as WWNH)
- Former call signs: WWNH (1947–1987); WKOS (1987–1990); WZNN (1990–1998); WGIN (1998–2012)

Technical information
- Licensing authority: FCC
- Facility ID: 53387
- Class: B
- Power: 5,000 watts
- Transmitter coordinates: 43°17′13.29″N 70°56′53.22″W

Links
- Public license information: Public file; LMS
- Webcast: Listen live (via iHeartRadio)
- Website: foxsports930.iheart.com

WPKX (930 kHz "Fox Sports 930") is a commercial AM radio station licensed to Rochester, New Hampshire, that broadcasts a sports radio format, largely supplied from Fox Sports Radio. The station is owned by iHeartMedia, Inc. and serves the Portsmouth-Dover-Rochester media market, also heard in Southern Maine. WPKX broadcasts at 5,000 watts around the clock from a transmitter off Route 108 in Rochester. To protect other stations on 930 kHz, WPKX uses a directional antenna at night.

== Programming ==
Most of WPKX's programming is provided by Fox Sports Radio. The station also carries play-by-play of Boston Bruins hockey, New Hampshire Fisher Cats minor league baseball, and the New Hampshire Wildcats (serving as co-flagship of the University of New Hampshire Wildcat Sports Network with WGIR and WQSO).

== History ==
WPKX signed on in 1947 as WWNH, owned by Strafford Broadcasting Corporation. Initially, a 1,000 watt daytimer, the station boosted power to 5,000 watts in 1954 and added night service, with the same power in 1967. WWNH was an easy listening station by 1971; that year, the station began an affiliation with CBS Radio. It became a contemporary station in 1974. An FM sister station, WWNH-FM 96.7 (now WQSO) was added October 21, 1979.

Strafford Broadcasting Corporation sold WWNH to Salmanson Communications Partners in 1987; by then, the station had a country music format. Salmanson later changed the call letters to WKOS (matching the WKOS-FM call letters adopted by 96.7 in 1987) and the format to adult standards, via the AM Only service from Transtar Radio Networks (now America's Best Music from Westwood One). (The WWNH call letters were reassigned to 1340 AM in Madbury, which operated from 1989 to 2010.) Another sale, this time to Bear Broadcasting Company, followed in 1990; Bear again changed the station's call letters and format, this time to WZNN and all-news, largely via a simulcast of CNN Headline News. In 1994, WZNN was again sold, this time to Precision Media, owner of WMYF (1540 AM, now WPKC) and WERZ (107.1 FM); Precision reverted the station to standards in 1995, a format it also ran on WMYF. However, although WZNN and WMYF simulcast a local morning show, the station could not air the Stardust programming WMYF aired the remainder of the day, as WZNN's signal overlapped with that network's Lakes Region affiliate, WASR; as a result, the station rejoined AM Only.

Precision Media sold its stations in the market to American Radio Systems (ARS) in 1997.

=== Expanded Band assignment ===
On March 17, 1997, the Federal Communications Commission (FCC) announced that 88 stations had been given permission to move to newly available "Expanded Band" transmitting frequencies, ranging from 1610 to 1700 kHz, with WZNN authorized to move from 930 to 1700 kHz. A construction permit for the expanded band station was assigned the call letters WAYU on March 6, 1998.

ARS sold WZNN and the WAYU construction permit, along with its other Seacoast properties, to Capstar Broadcasting in the midst of a merger with CBS Radio. Capstar converted WZNN and WMYF to a simulcast of Manchester sister station WGIR (an arrangement billed on-air as the "Action News Network") in September 1998, with 930 taking the WGIN callsign soon afterward. (The standards format would later be revived, under the WMYF callsign, on 1380 AM; that station, after several format changes, shut down in 2015.) Along with the WGIR simulcast came an affiliation with NBC Radio, which was subsequently phased out by Westwood One in favor of CNN Radio. A few months later, Capstar merged with fellow Hicks, Muse, Tate & Furst subsidiary Chancellor Media to form AMFM Broadcasting, which itself announced a merger with Clear Channel Communications (now known as iHeartMedia) several months afterward.

The FCC policy for expanded band stations was that both the original station and its expanded band counterpart could operate simultaneously for up to five years, after which owners would have to turn in one of the two licenses, depending on whether they preferred the new assignment or elected to remain on the original frequency. Plans for the unbuilt WAYU on 1700 AM were abandoned, and its construction permit was canceled on December 22, 2000. (WRCR in Ramapo, New York, later took advantage of this in order to move from 1300 to 1700 kHz.)

The station picked up Fox News Radio in the mid-2000s after Clear Channel signed a larger agreement with the service. In April 2011, WGIN dropped the WGIR simulcast and began to simulcast WMYF (by then an all-sports station affiliated with ESPN Radio); on February 7, 2012, the call sign was changed to WPKX. Most of the syndicated programming previously heard on WGIN is now carried on sister station WQSO. In 2013, the simulcast with WMYF ended and WPKX shifted to Fox Sports Radio.
