= WHOU-FM =

- Houlton, Maine; United States
- Broadcast area: Aroostook County, Maine
- Frequency: 100.1 MHz
- Branding: Houlton 100.1 FM

Programming
- Format: Classic hits
- Affiliations: ABC Radio, Red Sox Radio Network

Ownership
- Owner: Northern Maine Media, Inc.

History
- First air date: 1956
- Call sign meaning: HOUlton

Technical information
- Licensing authority: FCC
- Facility ID: 52037
- Class: C3
- ERP: 9,600 watts
- HAAT: 160 meters
- Transmitter coordinates: 46°8′35″N 68°6′50″W

Links
- Public license information: Public file; LMS
- Webcast: Listen Live
- Website: whoufm.com

WHOU-FM (100.1 FM) is a radio station broadcasting a classic hits format. Licensed to Houlton, Maine, United States, the station serves the Southern Aroostook County area, as well as Northern Penobscot and Northern Washington Counties, along with Western New Brunswick, Canada. The station is currently owned by Northern Maine Media and features programming from ABC Radio. The WHOU calls were also used on former sister station AM 1340.

On May 24, 2018, WHOU-FM changed their format from adult contemporary to classic hits.

== Current programming ==
A majority of WHOU's programming features new music from the Top 100 charts, along with a local morning show, afternoon request show,
