= WFRD =

- Hanover, New Hampshire; United States
- Broadcast area: Hanover–Lebanon, New Hampshire; White River Junction, Vermont
- Frequency: 99.3 MHz
- Branding: 99 Rock WFRD

Programming
- Format: Mainstream rock

Ownership
- Owner: Sugar River Media, LLC

History
- First air date: February 19, 1976
- Call sign meaning: "FM Radio Dartmouth"

Technical information
- Licensing authority: FCC
- Facility ID: 68281
- Class: A
- ERP: 6,000 watts
- HAAT: 100 meters (330 ft)
- Transmitter coordinates: 43°39′14.3″N 72°17′42.5″W

Links
- Public license information: Public file; LMS
- Webcast: Listen live; Listen live (Online Radio Box)
- Website: wfrd.com

WFRD (99.3 MHz "99 Rock") is a commercial FM radio station licensed to Hanover, New Hampshire, and owned and operated by Sugar River Media. The station's studios are located in Randolph, Vermont. WFRD airs a mainstream rock radio format with some alternative rock and classic rock tracks. Previously, it was owned and operated by Dartmouth Broadcasting from a studio on the Dartmouth College campus.

In addition to a standard analog transmission, WFRD is available online.

== Programming ==
The station's playlist on weekdays is mostly mainstream rock, plus alternative rock and classic rock titles. Weekday mornings feature Chris Garrett and the "Rock N Go Morning Show".

== History ==
WFRD's history goes back more than four decades. On February 19, 1976, WFRD first signed on the air. It originally broadcast a wide variety of music, from classical, jazz, folk music to progressive rock, punk rock and new wave music. The call letters stand for "We're FM Radio Dartmouth", referring to Dartmouth College. There was a lengthy debate over whether to choose WDCR-FM to link the FM station with its former AM companion, 1340 WDCR (now defunct), or to give the new FM station an independent identity. Among the arguments for an independent identity was the possibility of selling the AM station once FM became the more popular broadcast band.

Around 2001, WFRD began playing a modern rock format, although by the 2010s, WFRD began including other genres of current rock.

As of 2014, the station left the Nielsen BDS Alternative Rock indicator panel and was added to the Nielsen BDS Mainstream Rock indicator panel.

In June 2021, Dartmouth Broadcasting announced plans to sell the station, citing ongoing unprofitability and low student involvement in its operations as deciding factors. The online station WDCR and Dartmouth Broadcasting itself were not part of the planned sale. On October 13, 2021, Sugar River Media, owner of several other stations in the Lebanon-Hanover-White River Junction area (including WNTK-FM and WUVR), announced its acquisition of WFRD.

== Notable alumni ==
- Eric Wellman '91, current program director at WAXQ ("Q104.3") in New York City
- Eric MacDonald '04, former program director at WCTZ ("96.7 The Coast") in Norwalk, Connecticut (now WARW)

== See also ==
- Dartmouth Broadcasting
