= WMYF =

WMYF may refer to:

- WMYF (Portsmouth, New Hampshire), a defunct radio station (1380 AM) that held the call sign from 1998 to 2016
- WPKC (AM), a radio station (1540 AM) licensed to serve Exeter, New Hampshire, United States, which held the call sign WMYF from 1982 to 1998
