= WEIM =

WEIM may refer to:

- WEIM-LP, a low-power radio station (92.5 FM) licensed to serve West Liberty, Kentucky, United States
- WPKZ, a radio station (1280 AM) licensed to serve Fitchburg, Massachusetts, United States, which held the call sign WEIM from 1941 to 2009
