= WCVT =

- Stowe, Vermont; United States
- Broadcast area: Burlington, Vermont metropolitan area
- Frequency: 101.7 MHz
- Branding: 101.7 WCVT Classic Hits Vermont

Programming
- Format: Classic hits

Ownership
- Owner: Myers Mermel, Caroline McLain, and Scott Milne; (WCVT Acquisition LLC)
- Sister stations: WLVB; WDEV

History
- First air date: February 28, 1976
- Former call signs: WRFB (1976–1990); WVMX (1990–1997)
- Call sign meaning: "Classic Vermont"

Technical information
- Licensing authority: FCC
- Facility ID: 58564
- Class: C2
- ERP: 1,000 watts
- HAAT: 811 meters (2,661 ft)
- Transmitter coordinates: 44°31′32.1″N 72°48′52.4″W
- Translator: 102.5 W273AM (Montpelier)

Links
- Public license information: Public file; LMS
- Webcast: Listen live
- Website: classichitsvermont.com

WCVT (101.7 FM) is a radio station broadcasting a classic hits format, branded as "101.7 WCVT Classic Hits Vermont". Licensed to Stowe, Vermont, United States, the station serves Northern Vermont including the Burlington metro area, along with Montpelier and St. Johnsbury. It is owned by Myers Mermel, Caroline McLain, and Scott Milne, through licensee WCVT Acquisition LLC. Until 2025, the station was owned by the family of NASCAR broadcaster Ken Squier, the station's owner prior to his 2023 death.

== History ==
The station went on the air as WRFB on February 28, 1976, and became WVMX on October 28, 1990. On July 2, 1997, the station changed its call sign to the current WCVT. When the station's call sign changed, its format did as well, and it began airing classical music.

In June 2014, Radio Vermont announced that WCVT would drop the classical format in July, citing the growth of the noncommercial VPR Classical network. The station launched a full service classic hits music format branded as "101 The One" on July 1; ahead of the launch, the new format was described by owner Ken Squier as "a new adult service local to Vermont". On September 28, 2020, the station re-branded as "101.7 WCVT Classic Hits Vermont", while retaining a deep-library classic hits format.

Following Ken Squier's death in 2023, his family sold WCVT, WDEV, and WLVB to a partnership of Myers Mermel, Caroline McLain, and Scott Milne in a deal reached in 2024 and formally completed in 2025.

== Translator ==
Broadcast translator for WCVT
Call sign	Frequency	City of license	FID	ERP (W)	HAAT	Class	Transmitter coordinates	FCC info
W273AM	102.5 FM	Montpelier, Vermont	140188	250	−1.3 m (−4 ft)	D	44°14′40.2″N 72°34′35.3″W	LMS
