= WCNL =

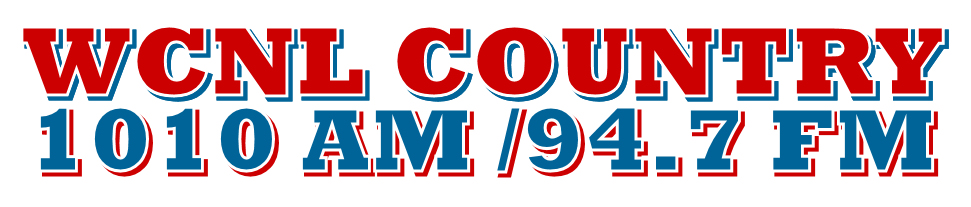
- Newport, New Hampshire; United States
- Broadcast area: Sullivan County, New Hampshire
- Frequency: 1010 kHz
- Branding: Country 1010

Programming
- Format: Country
- Affiliations: The UNH Sports Network; Red Sox Radio Network

Ownership
- Owner: Robert Landry and John Landry; (Sugar River Media, LLC)
- Sister stations: WCFR; WCVR; WNTK-FM; WUVR

History
- First air date: August 11, 1960
- Former call signs: WNTK (1988–2007)
- Call sign meaning: Claremont, Newport, New London

Technical information
- Licensing authority: FCC
- Facility ID: 35406
- Class: D
- Power: 10,000 watts day; 37 watts night
- Transmitter coordinates: 43°21′52.27″N 72°10′45.31″W
- Translator: 94.7 W234BN (Claremont)

Links
- Public license information: Public file; LMS
- Webcast: Listen live
- Website: www.country1010.com

WCNL is an AM radio station located at 1010 on the AM dial, licensed to Newport, New Hampshire. It was Newport's first radio station. The studios are located on Main Street in Newport, and its on-air slogan is Country 1010 WCNL-AM.

== Translator ==
Broadcast translator for WCNL
Call sign	Frequency	City of license	FID	ERP (W)	Class	Transmitter coordinates	FCC info
W234BN	94.7 FM	Claremont, New Hampshire	146333	220	D	43°23′34.5″N 72°18′12.1″W	LMS

== History ==
WCNL went on the air August 11, 1960, as a 250-watt daytimer on 1010, before moving up the dial with 10,000 watts of daytime power on 1020 and changing call letters to WNTK. WNTK became a stand-alone AM station when the original WCNL AM 1010 and WCNL-FM 101.7 were sold off to individual owners. WCNL-FM 101.7 became the original frequency for country formatted WXXK (Kixx). WNTK was fairly successful as a stand-alone AM talk signal. WNTK would eventually add a couple FM simulcast partners, with the first FM simulcast being on 100.5 FM then known as WNBX in Lebanon under a lease arrangement. WNTK received another simulcast partner, this time under the same ownership when the talk programming was broadcast over WNTK-FM 99.7 in New London where the talk format remains today.

WNTK was one of the early stations on board with The Rush Limbaugh Show, and was a huge catalyst in drawing listeners to the station. In fact, the station took advantage of Rush's popularity and even had a lifesize cardboard cutout of Rush which was brought to station live broadcasts. The owner, himself, was known to take Polaroid shots for listeners to keep while taking a picture with the Rush cutout. This cardboard cut of Rush was way before he 'slimmed down'. When Clear Channel bought WTSL in Hanover, New Hampshire, The Rush Limbaugh Show migrated to the much weaker 1400 signal, since The Rush Limbaugh Show's parent company was owned by Clear Channel. This was amid strong protests from the WNTK owner citing being an early and loyal affiliate, plus WNTK's strong 10,000 watt signal against WTSL's weaker 1,000 watt signal.

WNTK would then move back down the dial to 1010, this time remaining with 10,000 watts during daylight hours, and begin to broadcast with low night power. (1010 was a former Canadian clear channel frequency) When WNTK, now WCNL, operated on 1020 AM, the station had to cease operations at sunset to protect the 50,000 watt former clear channel signal of KDKA in Pittsburgh which throws a very powerful nighttime signal over the northeastern United States and beyond.

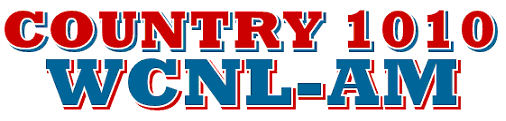
Logo from 2007 to 2009

WCNL for a time carried an Americana format, before evolving in 2007 to the current country music format. In September 2007, WNTK switched back to its original WCNL call sign.

In September 2009, WCNL launched its FM translator on 94.7 MHz.

In July 2010, WCNL became one of five radio stations in America to be nominated for the National Association of Broadcasters' "Small Market Radio Station Of The Year" Marconi Award. Other stations nominated were KFGO in Fargo, North Dakota; KGMI in Bellingham, Washington; KOFM in Enid, Oklahoma; and WFRE in Frederick, Maryland. WCNL has also been recognized locally as the "Radio Station Of The Year" in 2009, and "Radio Station Of The Year" Merit Award winner from the New Hampshire Association of Broadcasters in 2009 and 2010 respectively.

On February 3, 2017, WCNL was acquired by Sugar River Media, LLC.

== Current programming ==
WCNL currently carries Boston Red Sox baseball along with sister stations WNTK-FM, WCFR and WCVR. WCNL also is the weekly home of Newport High School football games. WCNL also airs the Newport Historical Society Minutes.

In December 2007, WCNL created the "Stuff a Truck" campaign for Toys For Tots - which evolved from WVRR/WMXR's former program director Steve Smith's Toys For Tots campaign called Stuff A Bus from 2004 to 2006. In 2007, WCNL raised 178 toys for Toys For Tots. In 2008, 547 toys were raised. In 2009, 831 toys were raised.

During the fall of 2008, the Coats for the Community campaign kicked off with the United Way of Sullivan County. 342 coats were raised for needy families in Sullivan County. Coats For the Community continued in 2009, raising over 700 jackets for needy families.

In February 2011, working with the Newport Recreation Department, WCNL helped organize and set a Guinness World Record for the Largest Mustache And Beard Competition. Entitled "The Great Mustache Contest" during the 95th Annual Newport Winter Carnival, 462 men competed for the title of "Grand 'Stache".

Smith is the present general manager, program director, and morning host of WCNL.

== Awards ==
- 2007: Newport Area Chamber of Commerce Busy Bee Award
- 2008: New Hampshire Association of Broadcasters Merit Award: Public Service Announcement
- 2008: New Hampshire Association of Broadcasters Golden Mike: Sports Play By Play
- 2008: Newport Area Chamber Of Commerce Community Service Award
- 2009: New Hampshire Association of Broadcasters Golden Mike: Public Service Announcement
- 2009: New Hampshire Association of Broadcasters Golden Mike: Radio Station of the Year
- 2010: National Association Of Broadcasters - "Small Market Radio Station Of The Year" - Marconi Award Finalist
- 2010: New Hampshire Association Of Broadcasters Golden Mic: Public Service Announcement
- 2010: New Hampshire Association Of Broadcasters Golden Mic: Radio Station Of The Year - Merit Award
- 2011: New Hampshire Association Of Broadcasters Granite Mic: Local/Station Event
- 2012: New Hampshire Association Of Broadcasters Granite Mic: Station Promotional Announcement
- 2013: New Hampshire Association Of Broadcasters Granite Mic: Radio Station Of the Year

== Awards and recognition to WCNL staff ==
Steve Smith - general manager

- 2011: Self Made In New Hampshire - Finalist - Business NH Magazine
- 2012: Radio's Rising Stars "35 Under 35" - Radio Ink Magazine
- 2012: Newport Distinguished Citizen Of The Year - Newport Area Chamber Of Commerce
- 2013: New Hampshire Young Professional Of The Year - Top 4 Finalist - Work Stay Play New Hampshire
- 2013: Community Citizen Award - Croydon Grange #357
- 2014: Best Radio Personality - Eagle Times
