= Dartmouth Broadcasting =

Dartmouth Broadcasting began in 1924 when members of the amateur radio club obtained a federal license to broadcast on the AM band, at 1170 kHz, as WFBK. Later renamed WDCH, the station continued until the fall of 1925 when an inadvertent obscenity uttered over the air caused the college president, Ernest Martin Hopkins, to permanently shut it down. Radio finally returned to Dartmouth in 1941 due to the efforts of a group of determined students (led by Richard Krolik, class of 1941) and younger faculty who persuaded Hopkins to give the students a second chance.

The new station, dubbed DBS, at first broadcast via tiny transmitters in each dormitory, each operating on a different frequency. In 1942 this unwieldy arrangement was changed to a "carrier current" system using the college electrical system to reach the dormitories. In 1948 the call letters were changed to WDBS, and in 1958, after considerable controversy, the station obtained a standard AM broadcast license. On March 4, 1958 the students began broadcasting to the entire Upper Valley region as WDCR at 1340 KHz on the dial. Dartmouth Broadcasting launched WFRD (FM Radio at Dartmouth) 99.3 FM on February 19, 1976.

== Student governance ==
Throughout most of its history the two stations were completely managed by students. Even today the vast majority of the on-air personnel are students, although there are some exceptions (such as the football play-by-play announcers.) This is an unusual example of student-run commercial radio. The management of the stations is by the Directorate consisting of: General Manager, Finance Director, AM Program Director, FM Program Director, Technical Director, Marketing/Alumni Relations, FM Promotions Director, News Director, Sports Director, Internet Director, and Training Director.

== Current organization ==
- WFRD is the FM portion of Dartmouth's radio program, also known as 99Rock. 99Rock broadcasts across the entire Dartmouth-Lake Sunapee Region (i.e., west-central New Hampshire), along with adjacent east-central Vermont. Though a classic rock format until the early 2000s, 99Rock now runs active rock music 24 hours a day, 7 days a week, showcasing bands like the Red Hot Chili Peppers, Green Day, Pearl Jam, and Sublime. On June 22, 2021, Dartmouth announced its intention to sell the broadcast license for WFRD and use the proceeds of the sale to fund the student-run online station.
- Dartmouth Election Network works with Dartmouth Broadcast News to provide election coverage year round. Every four years, it offers special election-night coverage during the famous New Hampshire primary. In 1988, they made a legendary faux pas when they called the Primary for Dick Gephardt, based on stronger than expected early returns: Gephardt in fact lost to Michael S. Dukakis by 16 percentage points, 36% to 20%. However, the coverage is of high quality and is sometimes syndicated to conventional radio stations. Dartmouth Broadcasting also covers other major elections as well as the two major parties' quadrennial conventions.
- Dartmouth Broadcast News has several news programs running on WDCR and WFRD. The news department works to provide listeners with timely updates of relevant news.

== Former facilities ==
- WDCR was the College's AM station and broadcast a wide variety of music, news, and sports. Having at different times been a talk, Top 40, and alternative rock station. Its signal usually only reached the immediate Hanover-Lebanon-White River Junction area. In October 2008, WDCR ceased over the air broadcasting, having established streaming over the internet. In September 2010, WDCR's license was returned to the F.C.C..

== Finances ==
Dartmouth Broadcasting receives little direct funding from Dartmouth College, although its studios are located on campus, and it is officially owned by the college's Board of Trustees. Money for operating expenses comes from local and national advertisers. The FM transmitter is off-campus in the neighboring community of West Lebanon, New Hampshire.
