= Jon Reep =

American comedian and actor

- Born: March 26, 1972 (age 54); Hickory, North Carolina, U.S.
- Notable work: "Hemi Guy" in Dodge Ram Hemi commercials
- Spouse(s): Genta Trimble (m. 2007; div. 2013) Jodie Stidham Patterson (m. 2023)

Comedy career
- Years active: 1998–present
- Medium: Stand-up comedy, film, television
- Genre: Stand-up comedy
- Website: jonreep.com

Jon Reep (born March 26, 1972) is an American stand-up comedian and actor, known as the "That thing got a Hemi?" guy in Dodge commercials starting in 2004. From 2004 to 2006, he played the recurring character Police Officer Gerald Bob in the ABC sitcom Rodney. In 2007, Reep won the fifth season of Last Comic Standing on NBC.

== Television roles ==
| Year | Title | Role | Notes |
|---|---|---|---|
| 2007 | CMT Comedy Club | Himself | |
| 2007 | Last Comic Standing | Himself | Winner |
| 2007 | Bandits vs. Smokies | Himself | |
| 2004–2006 | Rodney | Gerald Bob | |
| 2006 | Comedy Central Presents | Himself | |
| 2005 | Premium Blend | Himself | |
| 2001 | Late Friday | Himself | |
| 2008 | MADtv | Himself | |
| 2009 | Metro Jethro | Himself | |
| 2010 | Good Luck Charlie | Charity Collector | |
| 2013 | R U Faster Than a Redneck? | Himself | |
| 2013 | Eastbound & Down | Jed Forney | Season 4 |
| 2020 | American Dad! | Cleonard (voice) | Season 17, Episode 19 ("Dammmm, Stan!") |
| 2024 | Curb Your Enthusiasm | Emmett | Season 12, Episode 2 ("The Lawn Jockey") |

== Filmography ==
| Year | Title | Role |
|---|---|---|
| 2008 | Harold & Kumar Escape from Guantanamo Bay | Raymus |
| 2014 | Into the Storm | Reevis |
| 2021 | Poker Run | Alfie |

== Personal life ==
In 1995, Reep was at a Carolina Panthers inaugural football game in Clemson, South Carolina when the Panthers mascot, Sir Purr, called him to the field. Reep started dancing in the end zone until the police arrested him. Reep was then sent some Panthers memorabilia for the incident. On October 5, 2007, Reep married Genta Trimble in Maui, Hawaii. In March 2013, his wife Genta Reep filed for divorce. Following his divorce Reep married his long time girlfriend Jodie Stidham Patterson on April 15, 2023, at a charity benefit Reep had for raising funds for Opendoor Homeless Ministry.

Reep graduated from Fred T. Foard High School in Newton, North Carolina, in 1990. He later graduated from NC State University in 1997 with a Bachelor of Arts degree in theatre.

On September 5, 2025, Reep was arrested with 1 charge of second degree and 9 charges of third degree sexual exploitation of a minor. After a tip, a grand jury indicted him and a search warrant was executed. He was found in possession of child pornography.
