= R U Faster Than a Redneck? =

Television series

R U Faster Than a Redneck? is an American TV program on the Speed channel. The concept of the show is simple: volunteers can bring their import cars to the Carolina Motorsports Park Kershaw in Kershaw County, South Carolina, to race them against a selection of American muscle cars. If an import beats the American car in the first two heats (the first one round, the second three rounds) and then another in the final (three rounds on the one-mile race course), he gets $10,000. The show's host is comedian Jon Reep, and the regular announcer is Ken Squier. The show's stable consists of "full-blown, flannel-wearing, mullet-sporting rednecks" driving an assortment of "classic American muscle cars". Drivers can race stock and specialty cars, but they have to do so on street tires.

== Reviews ==
According to Hot Rod magazine, the show is interesting and not scripted like reality TV; the reviewer said that while in early rounds some imports were put up against clearly superior cars, "most of the show really does come down to the competitors".
