= WINY =

Radio station in Putnam, Connecticut

- Putnam, Connecticut; United States
- Broadcast area: Northeastern Connecticut
- Frequency: 1350 kHz
- Branding: WINY 1350 AM & 97.1 FM

Programming
- Format: adult contemporary; full-service radio
- Affiliations: AP News; Westwood One; Boston Red Sox Radio Network; Motor Racing Network; New England Patriots Radio Network

Ownership
- Owner: Gary and Karen Osbrey; (Osbrey Broadcasting Company)

History
- First air date: May 3, 1953
- Former call signs: WPCT (1953–1960)
- Call sign meaning: "Winny", the former cartoon mascot

Technical information
- Licensing authority: FCC
- Facility ID: 24112
- Class: D
- Power: 5,000 watts (day); 79 watts (night)
- Translator: 97.1 W246DN (Putnam)

Links
- Public license information: Public file; LMS
- Webcast: Listen live
- Website: www.winyradio.com

WINY (1350 AM) is a heritage radio station and is owned by Gary and Karen Osbrey through licensee Osbrey Broadcasting Company. The station broadcasts a full service adult contemporary radio format.

By day, WINY is powered at 5,000 watts non-directional. At night, to avoid interference to other stations on 1350 AM to avoid interference. it reduces power to 79 watts Programming is also heard on FM translator W271DN at 97.1 MHz.

In addition to its original programming, WINY is also a member station of the Boston Red Sox Radio Network, the New England Patriots Radio Network, and the Motor Racing Network.

== History ==
WINY first signed on the air on May 3, 1953, under the call letters WPCT. The station was financed by three French Canadian businessmen from Central Falls, Rhode Island: named Goyette, Albert Lanthier, and Rene Cote. The station was managed by Daniel Hyland with an original announcing staff of Dick Alarie, Ed Read, and Frank Carroll.

The call letters were changed to WINY in September 1960, when the station was purchased by the Herbert C. Rice family and the Winny Broadcasting Company. The call letters were changed to represent the station's new mascot, "Winny, The Community Gal", who was a counterpart to the mascot at sister station WILI, "Willie, The Community Man". The family combined the operations of the two stations into Nutmeg Broadcasting Company, which would go on to own a total of five radio stations throughout Connecticut, including WNTY in Southington, WLIS in Old Saybrook, and WILI and WILI-FM in Willimantic.

WINY changed hands in 1990 to the Gerardi Broadcasting Corporation, and once more in 2001 to the current owners, the Osbrey Broadcasting Company.

== Translators ==
Broadcast translator for WINY
Call sign	Frequency	City of license	FID	ERP (W)	HAAT	Class	Transmitter coordinates	FCC info
W246DN	97.1 FM	Putnam, Connecticut	200386	250	−17 m (−56 ft)	D	41°54′9.4″N 71°53′42.3″W	LMS
