= WDCR (New Hampshire) =

- Hanover, New Hampshire; United States
- Broadcast area: Upper Valley
- Frequency: 1340 kHz
- Branding: Dartmouth College Radio

Programming
- Format: College radio

Ownership
- Owner: Trustees of Dartmouth College
- Sister stations: WFRD

History
- First air date: March 4, 1958
- Last air date: August 2009
- Call sign meaning: Dartmouth College Radio

Technical information
- Licensing authority: FCC
- Facility ID: 68257
- Class: C
- Power: 1,000 watts
- Transmitter coordinates: 43°41′59.3″N 72°16′45.3″W

Links
- Public license information: Public file; LMS

WDCR (1340 AM) was a college radio station that operated at Dartmouth College for over fifty years. During this time, it underwent several format changes, from news to Top-40 to alternative music and in the end, oldies. Licensed to Hanover, New Hampshire, United States, the station served Hanover and the greater Upper Valley area. The station carried broadcasts of several Dartmouth College sports teams in association with the Dartmouth Sports Network, a division of Dartmouth Broadcasting. The station's license was held by the Board of Trustees of Dartmouth College.

== History ==
Dartmouth Broadcasting began in the 1920s, over copper wires linking all the dorms, using the call letters WDBS (Dartmouth Broadcasting System), changing to WDCR (Dartmouth College Radio) when it became an officially licensed station of the Federal Communications Commission, its first official broadcast at 1340 AM in 1958.

WDCR's origins lie in a carrier-current station, WDBS, which was started on October 27, 1941 (after a month of test programming). During the 1950s, efforts were made to obtain a license from the Federal Communications Commission (FCC), which would allow for an expansion of the station's reach to the rest of the Upper Valley; at 9 p.m. on March 4, 1958, WDCR signed on.

The station left the air on August 22, 2008, due to damage to WDCR's ground system during a construction project near the station's transmitter location; soon afterward, the station announced that it had transitioned to being an Internet radio station, WebDCR.com (although this station's website still features WDCR's logo). The station nonetheless briefly returned to the air in August 2009 in order to maintain the broadcast license; in September 2010, Dartmouth College surrendered the license to the FCC for cancellation. By this point, interest in the AM station had declined due to a combination of its time off-the-air and Dartmouth's expansion of its radio operations (in addition to WebDCR, Dartmouth had established an FM radio station, WFRD, in 1976).
