= Ken Squier =

American sports commentator (1935–2023)

- Born: Kenley Dean Squier; April 10, 1935; Waterbury, Vermont, U.S.
- Died: November 15, 2023 (aged 88); Stowe, Vermont, U.S.
- Occupation: Sportscaster
- Known for: Commentator on MRN, CBS Sports and TBS for NASCAR races

Kenley Dean Squier (April 10, 1935 – November 15, 2023) was an American sports commentator and motorsports editor from Waterbury, Vermont. From 1979 to 1997, he served as the lap-by-lap commentator for NASCAR on CBS, and was also a lap-by-lap commentator for TBS from 1983–1999. Squier was the first announcer to give lap-by-lap commentary for the Daytona 500 in 1979. He coined the term "The Great American Race" for the Daytona 500 and helped introduce the Australian-developed in-car camera for the 1982 running of the event. He lived in Stowe, Vermont until his death.

== Sports announcing career ==
=== Early career ===
Squier's father, Lloyd, owned and operated WDEV in Waterbury, Vermont, and Ken began his on-air work at the age of 12. When Lloyd Squier died in 1979, Ken Squier inherited the station and was its longtime principal owner and CEO. Squier's racing-announcing career began when he announced a stock car race from the back of an old logging truck at a tiny dirt track in Vermont at age 14. He was the announcer at Malletts Bay, the Northeastern Speedway, and the Monadnock Speedway in the 1950s. In 1960, he opened Thunder Road International SpeedBowl, the Barre, Vermont, quarter-mile oval, which was subsequently sold in April 2017.

Squier was among a group of six men who founded Catamount Stadium in Milton, Vermont, which operated from 1965–1987. He was a frequent announcer at this track, dubbed "The Home of the Brave".

Squier co-founded the Motor Racing Network with Bill France Sr. in 1970. He announced races on the network for several years before moving to television in the later 1970s.

=== NASCAR announcer ===
Squier served as a pit reporter for the first live "flag-to-flag" coverage of the Greenville 200 on ABC in 1971 and he joined CBS Sports a year later.

Squier believed that people would watch the entire Daytona 500. "It was a tough sell," he said. "There was a general feeling that this was more of a novelty thing and that it wouldn't work on a national level." On February 18, 1979, CBS aired the 1979 Daytona 500 flag-to-flag. Television ratings were high, in part because a major snowstorm on the East Coast kept millions of viewers indoors. Richard Petty won the race, but a fight between Donnie Allison and Cale Yarborough made headlines throughout the United States.

For the next 20 years, beginning in 1981, various TV stations would get NASCAR coverage on various tracks: CBS, TBS, TNN, ESPN, ABC, and NBC. Squier would work for CBS and TBS over this time, covering half of the Winston Million races—the Daytona 500 and Coca-Cola 600.

Squier stepped down as a lap-by-lap announcer on CBS in 1997 and was replaced in the booth by Mike Joy. Squier had announced every Daytona 500 from 1979 to 1997. He remained as TBS' lead commentator until retiring in 1999, with Allen Bestwick replacing him. Squier became the studio host for both networks, where he remained until 2000. Squier was also present in the Fox Sports studio during pre-race and post-race coverage of Daytona Speedweeks and the 2001 Daytona 500, the first-ever regular season Winston Cup Series event televised by Fox.

On July 13, 2014, NASCAR on TNT broadcast its final race at the Camping World RV Sales 301. After the pre-race show, Squier said goodbye to NASCAR on TNT in this speech:

Hello everyone, I'm Ken Squier. And as the engines have fired at New Hampshire, I remind you that this is the final NASCAR broadcast for Turner Sports. I was the play-by-play announcer for TBS for 18 years. Beginning in the very first year of NASCAR coverage, 1983. It's been a real honor to be a part of today's broadcast, and I wish my colleagues the very best today on TNT. As this amazing, 32-year run comes to a close, I hope you enjoy today's race.

In September 2015, it was announced Squier would call part of the Southern 500 race as part of a throwback weekend for NASCAR to celebrate the years 1970–1974. Squier was joined by Ned Jarrett and his son Dale Jarrett. As part of the deal with Darlington with its throwback theme for the next several years, the trio called part of the race again in 2016 as the years 1975–1984 were celebrated. They returned in the same capacity for 2017. Squier got some media reaction after nicknaming Erik Jones "That Jones Boy" for his top 5 streak.

=== Style ===
Squier's unique broadcasting style featured grandiose words and colorful metaphors. He often described NASCAR drivers in his era as "common men doing uncommon things". He called a last-lap battle at the 1979 Daytona 500 as "two of the greatest, fiddling, fidgeting with first place" and summed up Dale Earnhardt's wreck at the 1997 Daytona 500 with: "A true American hero, stymied another time at Daytona." His many catchphrases included describing wrecks as "side over side, end over end" and calling wrecked racecars "all torn up". A battle for position involving a large pack of cars drew comparisons to "an Oklahoma land rush." Drivers battling side by side would be "door handle to door handle" or "knuckle to knuckle". He was also known for the ability to switch between the "radio" style of broadcasting and "TV" styles. One of the best-known examples was the 1981 Talladega 500, when with a handful of laps to go the video went out and only the audio remained. Squier called the final laps and described Ron Bouchard's upset victory in typical style: "Three cars came out of the tri-oval, lined up like a squadron of P-51s out of World War Two and down they came to the line!"

=== Announcer in other sports ===
Squier announced CBS Sports' occasional CART IndyCar broadcasts in the 1990s as well as hosted the 1982 Individual Speedway World Championship from the Los Angeles Coliseum alongside four-time Speedway World Champion Barry Briggs of New Zealand and pit reporter Dave Despain. Squier hosted CBS' "live flag-to-flag" coverage of American Formula One races in the 1980s (e.g. Detroit, Dallas) along with David Hobbs and pit reporter Chris Economaki.

Squier also announced a wide range of sports outside of auto racing, including ice skating, golf, and tennis. He announced outside of the United States, including Australia, Japan, and Europe. He was a play-by-play announcer for CBS' United States coverage of the 1992 and 1994 Winter Olympics. In 2013, he was an announcer on the television show R U Faster Than a Redneck?.

== Later life and death ==
Squier contracted COVID-19 in November 2020. After long-term rehabilitation, Squier recovered from his illness by April 2021.

Squier died from complications of an intestinal blockage in Stowe, Vermont, on November 15, 2023. He was 88.

== Selected filmography ==
Squier acted in several movies, primarily as an announcer.

- The Cannonball Run (1981)
- Stroker Ace (1983)
- Rad (1986)
- CMT 40 Greatest NASCAR Moments
- Daytona 500: Drama, Danger, Dedication

== Business ventures ==
- He helped co-found Motor Racing Network, as well as his play by play announcing on the network.
- President/owner of Radio Vermont, Inc. and its radio stations WDEV, WLVB, and WCVT. Squier sold the stations to Steve Cormier in 2017 but continued to host the novelty music showcase "Music to Go to the Dump By" until his retirement. Cormier and the Squier estate sold the stations to Scott Milne and Myers Mermel after Squier's death.
- Co-founded World Sports Enterprises with Fred Rheinstein, the first television production company to specialize in motorsports. It was sold to The Nashville Network in 1995 and then to CBS in 1997. WSE was closed by MTV Networks.
- Founder of Thunder Road International SpeedBowl in Barre Town, Vermont, which he sold in April 2017.
- Founder of the American Canadian Tour late model racing series.
- Former co-owner of Airborne Speedway, Plattsburgh, New York.

== Career awards ==
=== Halls of Fame ===
- He was in the Oceanside Rotary Club of Daytona Beach Stock Car Racing Hall of Fame in 2000.
- Squier was inducted into the New England Auto Racers Hall of Fame in 2002.
- He was a charter member of the Vermont Broadcasters Hall of Fame.
- He was awarded the 2003 Smokey Yunick Award for his lifelong contributions to motorsports.
- He was in the Vermont Sports Hall of Fame.
- He was a member of the NASCAR Hall of Fame's Class of 2018.
- He was inducted into the Motorsports Hall of Fame of America in 2010.

=== Broadcasting awards ===
- Henry T. McLenore Motorsports Press Award – Journalism
- Buddy Shuman Award, Motor Racing Network – Radio Race Coverage
- E.M.P.A. Art Peck Award – Announcer
- Eastern Motor Sport Press Association Award – Journalism
- Vermont Sportscaster of the Year: 1963, 1967, 1969, 1973, 1997
- Flock Award, Charlotte Motor Speedway: 1987
