= WERZ =

Radio station in Exeter, New Hampshire

- Exeter, New Hampshire; United States
- Broadcast area: Portsmouth, New Hampshire
- Frequency: 107.1 MHz (HD Radio)
- Branding: Z107

Programming
- Format: Top 40 (CHR)
- Affiliations: Premiere Networks

Ownership
- Owner: iHeartMedia; (iHM Licenses, LLC)
- Sister stations: WHEB; WPKX; WQSO; WTBU

History
- First air date: September 21, 1972
- Former call signs: WKXR-FM (1972–1982)

Technical information
- Licensing authority: FCC
- Facility ID: 53385
- Class: A
- ERP: 5,200 watts
- HAAT: 106 meters (348 ft)
- Transmitter coordinates: 43°1′38.3″N 70°52′49.1″W

Links
- Public license information: Public file; LMS
- Webcast: Listen live (via iHeartRadio)
- Website: z107fm.iheart.com

WERZ (107.1 FM) is a radio station licensed to Exeter, New Hampshire. The station is owned by iHeartMedia. WERZ broadcasts from studios located on Lafayette Road in Portsmouth and from a transmitter located on Long Hill in Stratham. Its on-air call sign is "Z107, Exeter/Portsmouth". WERZ's signal serves the coastal area from Salem Harbor up north to Biddeford, Maine, including the Portsmouth and Dover-Rochester areas of New Hampshire, southern York County, Maine, and northeastern Massachusetts, where it overlaps with sister station WXKS-FM from Boston.

== History ==
The station went on the air September 21, 1972, as WKXR-FM. In March 1982, the call letters were changed to WERZ and the format was changed to Top 40/CHR as "Z107". The first program director was Jack O'Brien and the studios were located at 11 Downing Court in Exeter.

Boston area concert promoter Don Law's Precision Media purchased the station in 1986 and modified the format to a hybrid of adult contemporary and top 40 (hot adult contemporary) as "107 FM WERZ". In 1989, WERZ had a slogan of "13 Hits in a row" and competed wildly against WHEB AM–FM. Pete Falconi was program director and allowed air staff such as Lindsay Robins, Tim Fontaine, and Jeff the Doctor, to produce authentic, and unique radio shows. The result was pumping out as many hits an hour as possible, and providing the community of the Seacoast with live remote broadcasts. Ratings as per Arbitron (1989) competed well with WHEB.

Specialty weekend programs helped to boost ratings, including the legendary American Top 40 with Shadoe Stevens, the Weekly Top 40 with Rick Dees, and The WERZ's House Party Saturday Night featuring uptempo party songs and a megamix of popular dance music, as well as frequent prize giveaways and heavy listener interaction and requests.

WERZ remained a hot throughout all of the 2000s. For the first time in December 2008, WERZ went all-Christmas. After the holiday season, WERZ became an adult contemporary. Then, in December 2009, WERZ went Christmas again and this time returned to a hot AC format.

In February 2010, WSKX and WERZ announced that Matty in the Morning, syndicated by WXKS-FM out of Boston, would be moving from WSKX to WERZ.

On October 4, 2012, at 3 pm, WERZ returned to a CHR format and the "Z107" branding.
