= WTBU (FM) =

Country music radio station in York Center, Maine

- York Center, Maine; United States
- Broadcast area: York County, Maine; Seacoast Region (New Hampshire)
- Frequency: 95.3 MHz (HD Radio)
- Branding: 95.3 The Bull

Programming
- Format: Country music

Ownership
- Owner: iHeartMedia; (iHM Licenses, LLC)
- Sister stations: WERZ; WHEB; WPKX; WQSO

History
- First air date: June 1987; 39 years ago
- Former call signs: WQMI (1987); WQMI-FM (1987–1989); WCQL-FM (1989–1996); WXHT (1996–1999); WUBB (1999–2008); WSKX (2008–2014)
- Call sign meaning: "The Bull"

Technical information
- Licensing authority: FCC
- Facility ID: 35218
- Class: A
- ERP: 1,450 watts
- HAAT: 206 meters (676 ft)
- Transmitter coordinates: 43°13′25.3″N 70°41′35.1″W

Links
- Public license information: Public file; LMS
- Webcast: Listen live (via iHeartRadio)
- Website: 953bull.iheart.com

WTBU (95.3 MHz, "The Bull") is an FM radio station licensed to York Center, Maine, United States. Established in 1987, WTBU is owned by iHeartMedia and serves York County, Maine, and the New Hampshire Seacoast. The station broadcasts a country music format.

== History ==
The station went on the air in June 1987 as WQMI with a middle of the road format. In 1989, it became WCQL-FM as "Cool 95.3" with an oldies format. That was dropped in August 1996 in favor of a contemporary hit radio format, WXHT ("Heat 95.3"), which placed a heavy emphasis on 1980s new wave hits. That lasted until May 1998, when it went modern rock as "95-3 The Heat" via Radio One Networks.

In March 1999, the station changed to a country format, becoming WUBB ("B95.3"). However, WUBB was faced with strong competition from country leader WOKQ, which also had a much stronger signal. WUBB also had a limited local presence when compared to WOKQ. As a result, WUBB never became a big ratings success.

On January 10, 2008, the station dropped its country format and began simulcasting sister station WQSO; WUBB's website stated "Coming Soon! Sports Radio" with a link to MSN's Fox Sports page, implying that the new format would be Fox Sports Radio. However, this never happened, and this was thought to be put on the website only to throw people off. The following day, the stunt shifted to TV theme songs; in between the songs, there was a message saying "We are building a new station just for you," promoting a new format that would be launched at 6 a.m. on the 14th. At the announced time, the station relaunched as "Kiss 95.3", initially simulcasting WXKS-FM from Boston. Soon after, the call letters changed to WSKX. By August of the following year, WSKX ended the simulcast and ran its own CHR format.

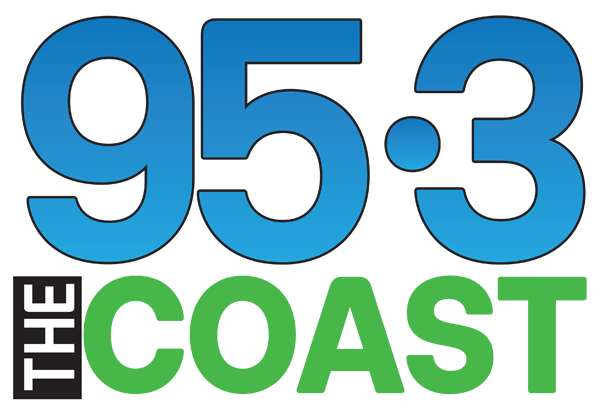
Logo as "95.3 The Coast"

On October 4, 2012, sister station WERZ adopted 95.3's old format, and the station began stunting with sounds of ocean waves and occasional bells, along with voiceover Chad Erickson (as well as its website) redirecting Kiss listeners to WERZ, and advising them to tune in the following Tuesday, October 9, at Noon. At that time, the station flipped to adult hits as "95.3 The Coast", launching with Journey's "Don't Stop Believin'". In November 2013, WSKX flipped to Christmas music for the holiday season, letting listeners choose online the music to be played; this feature was also used for the station's regular variety hits programming.

On August 29, 2014, at 1 p.m., the station flipped back to country as 95.3 The Bull. The last song on "The Coast" was "Closing Time" by Semisonic, while the first song on "The Bull" was "This Is How We Roll" by Florida Georgia Line. It shares a common coverage area with market-leading WOKQ, as well as WBQQ, a York County simulcast of WTHT from the Portland area. On September 16, 2014, WSKX changed its call letters to WTBU to go with "The Bull" branding.

== HD Radio ==
WTBU's second HD Radio subchannel carries a classic country format; the format had been carried on sister station WMYF (1380 AM) until its 2015 shutdown.
