= WMRC =

- Milford, Massachusetts; United States
- Broadcast area: Worcester, Massachusetts
- Frequency: 1490 kHz
- Branding: MyFM 101.3

Programming
- Format: Full-service classic hits
- Affiliations: Premiere Networks; Boston Bruins Radio Network; Boston Red Sox Radio Network; New England Patriots Radio Network

Ownership
- Owner: MyFM Media; (First Class Radio Corp.)

History
- First air date: October 6, 1956
- Former call signs: WMOO (1956–1958)
- Call sign meaning: Milford Radio Corporation (former owners)

Technical information
- Licensing authority: FCC
- Facility ID: 21584
- Class: C
- Power: 1,000 watts (unlimited)
- Transmitter coordinates: 42°8′12.35″N 71°30′48.23″W
- Translator: 101.3 W267CD (Milford)

Links
- Public license information: Public file; LMS
- Webcast: Listen live
- Website: www.myfmtoday.com/myfm/

WMRC (1490 AM, "MyFM 101.3") is a radio station licensed to serve Milford, Massachusetts, United States. The station is owned by the MyFM Media Corporation. It airs a full-service classic hits music format. At 10:13 am ET on January 12, 2017, FM translator, 101.3 W267CD was added and the station's former "First Class Radio" branding was replaced with its current "MyFM 101.3" branding (referring to the translator frequency). In addition to its usual music programming, WMRC broadcasts local high school and American Legion sports play-by-play. WMRC is an affiliate of the Boston Bruins, Boston Red Sox and New England Patriots Radio Networks.

The station signed on October 6, 1956, as WMOO. It was assigned the WMRC call letters by the U.S. Federal Communications Commission (FCC) on March 18, 1958.

Notable on-air personalities have included program and news director Ed Thompson, who joined the station in 1967. In 1993 the Milford Highlanders Brothers and Belles organization honored Thompson at their 10th annual Outstanding Citizens Ball for his service to the community.

The callsign was assigned to a station in Greenville, South Carolina, until the mid-1950s. A notable personality on that station was Bob Poole.

== Awards and honors ==
Former logo of the radio station, used until May 16, 2010

WMRC is the only radio station to win the "Station of the Year" award from the Massachusetts Broadcasters Association on three separate occasions, including a split win with WBOQ in 1993 and a solo award in 1995.

In 2003, Thomas M. McAuliffe II was elected chairman of the board of the Massachusetts Broadcasters Association. At the time of his election, he was also vice president and general manager of WMRC.

In 2008, WMRC received the Cary Simpson Award for Community Service from the International Broadcasters Idea Bank for the station's dedication to public service. The station was cited for "overall excellence in all facets of operation including growth of audience, client base, and service to the community."

== Ownership ==
In March 1983, WMRC was acquired by Loren F. Ghiglione from the Milford Radio Corporation. In August 1983, Ghiglione transferred the license to the Milford Media Corporation. In July 1984, Milford Media Corporation transferred the license to Nanlo Inc. Nanlo Inc. was owned by Worcester County Newspapers, a media holding corporation for which Loren F. Ghiglione served as president.

In May 1990, Thomas M. McAuliffe, president of First Class Radio Corporation, reached an agreement to purchase WMRC from Nanlo Inc. The sale was approved by the FCC in August 1990 and the deal was completed in September 1990. The sale price was not disclosed.

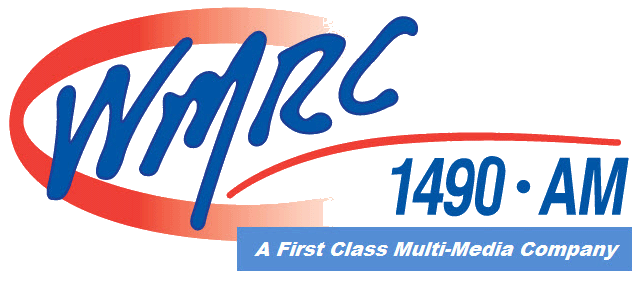
Logo from May 16, 2010, to January 12, 2017

In December 2006, Thomas M. McAuliffe II acquired the station from his father.

== Translators ==
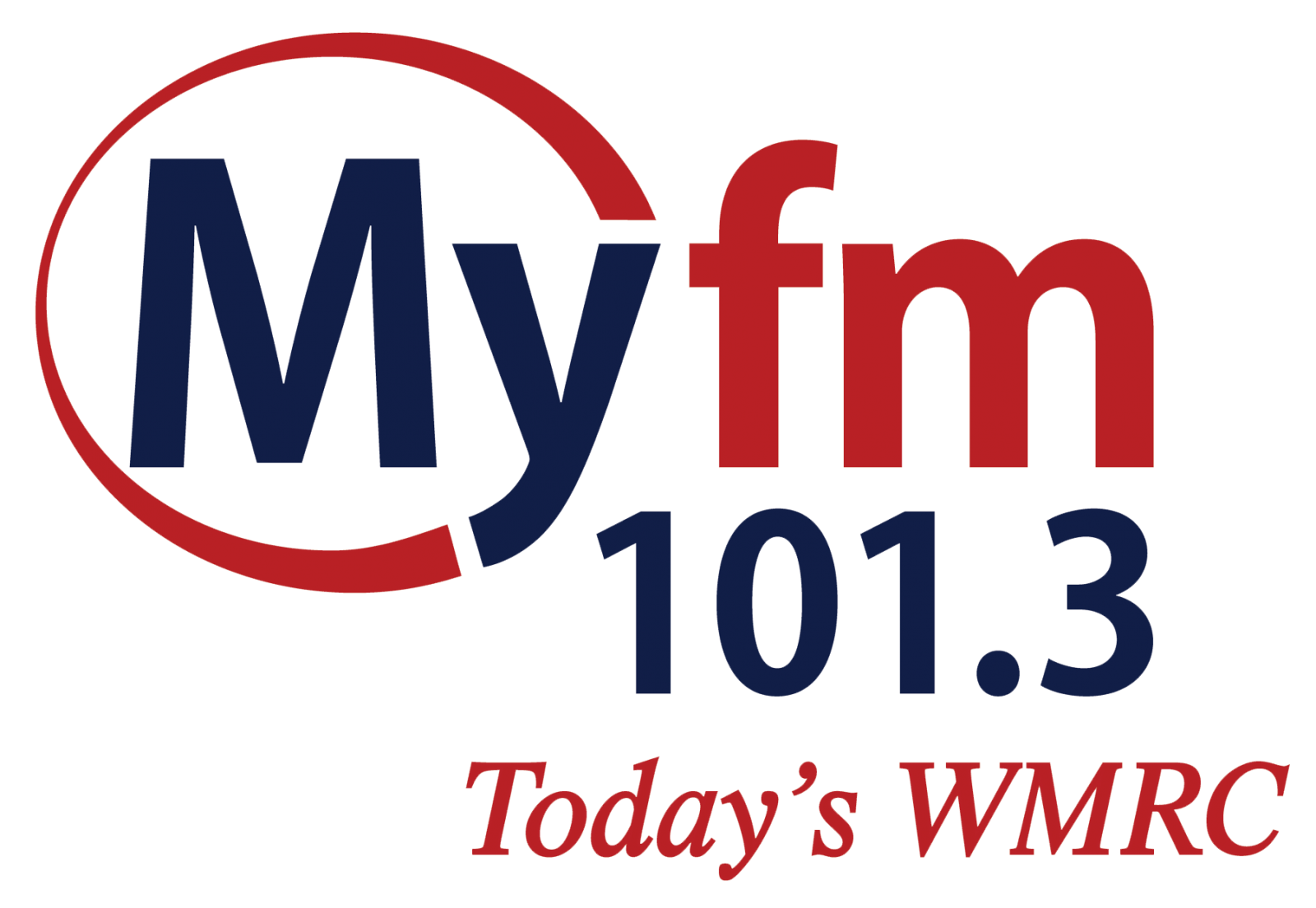
Previous logo

In addition to the main station, WMRC is relayed by an FM translator.

| Call sign | Frequency | City of license | FID | ERP (W) | Class | Transmitter coordinates | FCC info |
|---|---|---|---|---|---|---|---|
| W267CD | 101.3 FM | Milford, Massachusetts | 140722 | 150 | D | 42°9′19.3″N 71°32′51.2″W | LMS |
