= WDEV =

Full service radio station in Waterbury, Vermont

WDEV and WDEV-FM
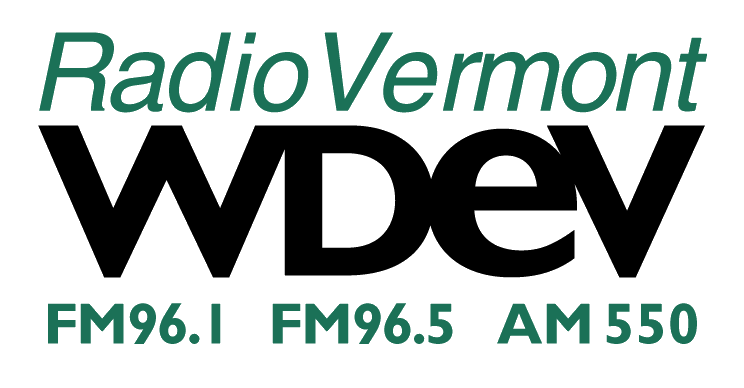

WDEV: Waterbury, Vermont; WDEV-FM: Warren, Vermont; United States
- Broadcast area: Central Vermont and Burlington metro area
- Frequencies: WDEV: 550 kHz; WDEV-FM: 96.1 MHz
- Branding: Radio Vermont

Programming
- Format: Full service
- Affiliations: ABC News Radio; Boston Red Sox Radio Network; New England Patriots Radio Network; Motor Racing Network; ESPN Radio

Ownership
- Owner: Myers Mermel, Caroline McLain, and Scott Milne; (WDEV LLC)
- Sister stations: WCVT; WLVB; WIRY

History
- First air date: WDEV: July 16, 1931; WDEV-FM: August 11, 1989
- Former call signs: WDEV-FM: WSBH (1988–1990); WDOT-FM (1990–1992)

Technical information
- Licensing authority: FCC
- Facility ID: WDEV: 54866; WDEV-FM: 54867
- Class: WDEV: B; WDEV-FM: C3
- Power: WDEV: 5,000 watts (day); 1,000 watts (night)
- ERP: WDEV-FM: 400 watts
- HAAT: WDEV-FM: 694 meters (2,277 ft)
- Transmitter coordinates: WDEV: 44°21′17.2″N 72°45′5.42″W; WDEV-FM: 44°7′37.2″N 72°55′41.4″W
- Translator(s): WDEV-FM: 96.5 W243AT (Barre); WDEV-FM: 98.3 W252CU (Montpelier); WDEV-FM: 101.9 W270BR (Island Pond)

Links
- Public license information: WDEV: Public file; LMS; WDEV-FM: Public file; LMS
- Webcast: Listen live
- Website: wdevradio.com

WDEV (550 kHz) is a commercial AM radio station in Waterbury, Vermont, United States. Programming is simulcast on WDEV-FM (96.1 MHz) licensed to Warren, Vermont. The stations' studios and offices are located near U.S. Route 2 in Waterbury. WDEV also operates two translator stations, W243AT (96.5 FM), licensed to Barre, Vermont, and W252CU (98.3 FM), licensed to Montpelier, Vermont. WDEV can also be heard on a privately owned translator, W270BR (101.9 FM), licensed to Island Pond, Vermont. The stations are owned by WDEV LLC, and air a full service radio format, including news, talk, sports and different genres of music.

== History ==
WDEV first signed on the air on July 16, 1931. It is one of Vermont's earliest stations, going on the air after WCAX (now WVMT) in Burlington and WSYB in Rutland. WDEV had been owned by the Squier family and their company, Radio Vermont Group, since 1935. Lloyd Squier owned the station from 1935 until his death in 1979, and passed it to his son, NASCAR broadcaster Ken Squier.

In 1966, one year after The Sound of Music was released, the von Trapp family broadcast a public concert on WDEV from the family's lodge in Stowe, Vermont.

In 1991, Squier bought WDOT-FM in Warren and changed its call sign to WDEV-FM. The FM station serves mainly to improve WDEV's coverage, particularly at night when the AM side must reduce power to 1,000 watts in order to protect other regional stations on the frequency such as WGR in Buffalo, New York, which likewise flips to a directional pattern to protect WDEV.

A 2003 article, in Harper's magazine, cited WDEV as one of the best examples of independent radio broadcasting in the United States.

In April 2017, Squier announced he had put the Radio Vermont stations up for sale, citing his age. On October 1, 2017, Squier turned the station over to Steve Cormier, who served as Radio Vermont's sales manager. The terms of the sale allowed Squier to continue to have any role at the station he pleased. Cormier was ultimately unable to secure the funding needed to buy the station but remained on the station staff; Squier was still listed as the owner of Radio Vermont when he died on November 15, 2023.

Two months after Squier's death, in January 2024, his estate—led by his daughter Ashley Squier-Crouch, who did not seek to retain the station and was working with her father to find owners before his death—sold the station to a partnership headed by Mark Myers Mermel and Scott Milne, two businessmen notable for their involvement in the Vermont Republican Party, and Carolin McLain; the sale ends the Squier family's 88-year run as owners of the station. Mermel displaced Cormier as WDEV's manager in March 2024, forcing Cormier and a total of 7 other unnamed WDEV staffers out of their jobs; at the time, the sale to Mermel, McLain and Milne was being held up due to a flaw in the succession process that led to the wrong trustee, Glen Wright, inheriting the station and could not take place until Squier-Crouch was the controlling trustee, a process that was ongoing at the time. The sale was filed with the FCC in November and was approved in 2025.

== Translators ==
In addition to the main station, WDEV is relayed by several translators.

Call sign	Frequency	City of license	FID	ERP (W)	HAAT	Class	Transmitter coordinates	FCC info
W243AT	96.5 FM	Barre, Vermont	139875	99	−68 m (−223 ft)	D	44°10′42.2″N 72°29′18.3″W	LMS
W252CU	98.3 FM	Montpelier, Vermont	140228	250	−1.3 m (−4 ft)	D	44°14′40.2″N 72°34′35.3″W	LMS
W270BR	101.9 FM	Island Pond, Vermont	155235	10	194.8 m (639 ft)	D	44°47′2.1″N 71°53′12.3″W	LMS

== Programming ==
=== News and talk ===
WDEV's news programming consists of several talk shows along with three major newscasts per day. The station's morning drive time program is called The Morning News Service, and the afternoon drive-time show is called The Afternoon News Service, with an additional newscast that airs at noon called The Midday News Service. The morning and afternoon news consist of local, state, and national news, in addition to interviews with reporters from WCAX-TV, Vermont's CBS affiliate, and VTDigger.org, an investigative news site. All newscasts feature a weather update from Roger Hill, the station's meteorologist. WDEV also carries WCAX-TV's 11 p.m. newscast.

Weekday programming features several local talk shows that span the political spectrum. Vermont radio veteran Ric Cengeri hosts “Vermont Viewpoint”, followed by Bill Sayer's “Common Sense Radio”, a conservative talk show. Early afternoons include “Equal Time Radio” with Traven and “The Vermont Conversation” with David Goodman. Most of the talk programming, including Democracy Now!, are brokered.

On weekends, a three-hour newscast starts Saturday mornings, along with a half-hour newscast at noon. On Sundays, CBS News Sunday Morning, Face The Nation, 60 Minutes, Jill on Money and the CBS News Weekend Roundup are heard.

=== Music ===
WDEV's music programming consists of several different genres that air throughout the week. On weekday afternoons, “The Getaway” is heard, a country/rock music program hosted by Greg Hooker. WDEV also airs a nightly jazz program, hosted by James Atherlay, unless the station is airing a sports game during that time. WDEV's weekend programming is made up almost entirely of music. Vermont broadcasting veteran Joel Najman hosts “The Great American Music Hall” on weekend middays.

=== Sports ===
WDEV features sports updates during all three of its newscasts. During the Morning News Service, Mal "The Sammie" Boright has sports updates, and during the Midday and Afternoon News Services James Atherlay delivers the sports report. Atherlay then goes on to host Score, Sports Talk and Rock. On Tuesday afternoons, Ken Squier is joined by Jasper Goodman, who goes on to talk about local, regional, and national sports, including the Red Sox during the MLB season.

WDEV is an affiliate of the Boston Red Sox and New England Patriots Radio Networks. WDEV carries all regular-season and postseason Red Sox games. The station also broadcasts Norwich University men's ice hockey and select Vermont high school basketball and football games. WDEV also airs auto racing from Thunder Road International SpeedBowl in Barre, Vermont, when there is no other programming conflict. Appropriately given its long ownership by Ken Squier, WDEV also airs NASCAR Cup Series events when there is no conflict. Part of Sunday and each overnight, WDEV carries ESPN Radio.

=== The Trading Post ===
The Trading Post is hosted Monday through Saturday by Lee Kittell after the Morning News Service. People call in or write in with three items or less (and only one car, unless the others are free or a parts car) to advertise them to the listening public.

=== Music to Go to the Dump By ===
"Music to Go to the Dump By" is a roughly one-hour radio comedy program that airs each Saturday morning on WDEV, hosted by Joel Najman, with regular contributions from Farmer Dave, who has run since 2002 on the "Undecided Cow Party" ticket for governor of the state, among other guest hosts.

It consists of odd songs, jokes the readers send in, banter between Najman and Farmer Dave (along with whoever else might be in the studio), and running gags involving cows. The songs tend to be weird, and are an eclectic mix of rare recordings, novelty songs, home recordings sent in, dog music (and obligatory equal-time cat music), cow music from Mylo Hatzenbuhler, and a selection of country comedy songs along with outsider and parody/cover selections from artists such as Mrs. Miller and Jonathan and Darlene Edwards. Each episode ends with a closing hymn, a farcical number loosely related to religion and to whatever sport is in season (such as Bobby Bare's "Drop Kick Me Jesus" during football season or Randy Brooks's "Will You Be Ready at the Plate When Jesus Throws the Ball?"—or the cover version by Brooks's collaborator Dr. Elmo—during baseball season), with a closing dedication to the memory of Squier, Marie (the local stage proprietor whom Squier credited with creating the show's name and concept), and Buster the Wonder Dog, Squier's pet border collie and nominal co-host who died in 2008.

In November 2020, Squier—who had hosted the show since the 1960s—was diagnosed with a severe case of COVID-19, forcing him into retirement; he only made sporadic appearances after his recovery.
