= WGIR-FM =

- Manchester, New Hampshire; United States
- Broadcast area: Manchester-Nashua-Concord, New Hampshire
- Frequency: 101.1 MHz
- Branding: Rock 101

Programming
- Format: Mainstream rock

Ownership
- Owner: iHeartMedia, Inc.; (iHM Licenses, LLC)
- Sister stations: WGIR

History
- First air date: June 5, 1963
- Former call signs: WGIR-FM (1963–1969); WNHS (1969–1972)
- Call sign meaning: Girolimon family (former owner of its sister AM station)

Technical information
- Licensing authority: FCC
- Facility ID: 35240
- Class: B
- ERP: 11,500 watts
- HAAT: 313 meters (1,027 ft)
- Transmitter coordinates: 42.982°N 71.589°W

Links
- Public license information: Public file; LMS
- Webcast: Listen live (via iHeartRadio)
- Website: rock101fm.iheart.com

WGIR-FM (101.1 MHz) is a commercial radio station in Manchester, New Hampshire, airing a mainstream rock radio format, branded as Rock 101. The station serves the Merrimack Valley area (including Concord and Nashua) and is owned by iHeartMedia, Inc., America's largest owner of radio stations. Weekdays begin with the comedy radio show Greg and the Morning Buzz, hosted by Greg Kretschmar. It is shared with co-owned WHEB in Portsmouth, and regionally syndicated in northern New England. The rest of the day, local DJs are heard. On Sunday nights, WGIR-FM carries the syndicated radio show The House of Hair with Dee Snider.

WGIR-FM's studios and offices are on Foundry Street in Manchester. The transmitter is on Mount Uncanoonuc, off Perimeter Road in Goffstown, near other towers serving Southern New Hampshire TV and FM stations.

== History ==
On June 5, 1963, WGIR-FM first signed on, under the ownership of Knight Quality Stations, Inc. At first, it simulcast co-owned WGIR (610 AM) with a mix of middle of the road music, talk and information, including NBC Radio News. It was powered at 5,000 watts, less than half its current output.

The 1970s saw WGIR-FM adopt a soft rock format including artists such as Fleetwood Mac, Linda Ronstadt, James Taylor, and Carole King. In 1979, the station began calling itself "Rock 101". WGIR-FM's sound evolved into a more mainstream album-oriented rock format. The power was increased to 9,600 watts.

Knight Quality Stations announced the sale of its eight New England radio stations, including WGIR-FM, to Capstar Broadcasting Partners in April 1997; upon assuming control in January 1998, the stations were operated by Capstar's Atlantic Star Communications subsidiary. Capstar and Chancellor Media announced in August 1998 that they would merge (Hicks, Muse, Tate & Furst was a major shareholder in both companies); upon the merger's completion in July 1999, the combined company was named AMFM Inc. AMFM was in turn acquired by Clear Channel Communications (forerunner to iHeartMedia) in a deal announced on October 4, 1999, and completed in August 2000.

From the 1990s to the early 2000s, WGIR-FM played mostly classic rock. Saturdays and Sundays featured "Block Party Weekends" where three songs were played in a row from the same rock artist. In the early 2000s, the station moved to a harder-edged rock format featuring current and past rock acts. By 2005, the station had moved to a more contemporary rock format, After a few years, the playlist once again included a good number of rock artists from past years, including Led Zeppelin, Van Halen, Aerosmith, and Ozzy Osbourne. WGIR-FM was part of the Motor Racing Network (MRN) and would broadcast NASCAR races; the station dropped MRN after the 2017 season.
