= WHEB =

Rock radio station in Portsmouth, New Hampshire

- Portsmouth, New Hampshire; United States
- Broadcast area: Seacoast Region of New Hampshire and Southern Maine
- Frequency: 100.3 MHz (HD Radio)
- Branding: 100.3 WHEB

Programming
- Format: Mainstream rock
- Affiliations: United Stations Radio Networks

Ownership
- Owner: iHeartMedia; (iHM Licenses, LLC)
- Sister stations: WERZ; WPKX; WQSO; WTBU

History
- First air date: January 14, 1964
- Former call signs: WHEB-FM (1964–1967); WPFM (1967–1971); WHEB-FM (1971–1991)

Technical information
- Licensing authority: FCC
- Facility ID: 35219
- Class: B
- ERP: 50,000 watts
- HAAT: 140 meters (460 ft)
- Transmitter coordinates: 43.053°N 70.767°W

Links
- Public license information: Public file; LMS
- Webcast: Listen live (via iHeartRadio)
- Website: wheb.iheart.com

WHEB (100.3 FM) is a commercial radio station licensed to Portsmouth, New Hampshire, and serving the Seacoast Region of New Hampshire and Southern Maine. The station airs a mainstream rock radio format and is owned by iHeartMedia. WHEB broadcasts in the HD Radio format. WHEB's studios, offices and transmitter are on Lafayette Road in Portsmouth.

== Programming ==
WHEB is the home of regional comedy radio show, The Morning Buzz, hosted by Greg Kretschmar. Other programming features local or national DJs. It is consistently one of the top two stations in the Nielsen ratings' Portsmouth-Dover radio market.

== History ==
The station originated as the second incarnation of an FM adjunct to an existing AM station, WHEB on 750 kHz. The AM station held a limited-time authorization which meant it could only broadcast until sunset in Atlanta, Georgia, where the frequency's dominant station, WSB, was located.

=== WFMI ===
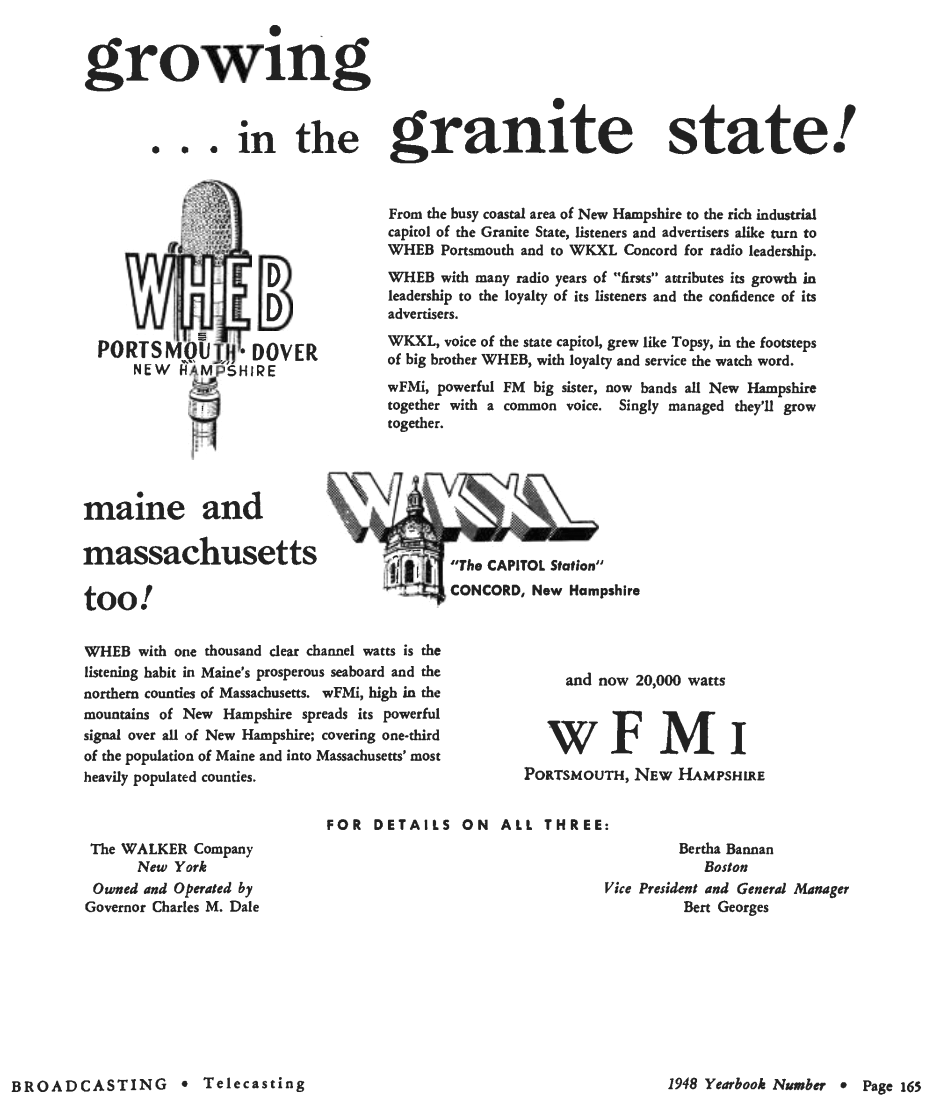
1948 advertisement for the three Walker Company stations, including the soon-to-be-deleted WFMI.

In 1947, construction began on an FM station that could also provide nighttime service, WFMI on 97.3 MHz, licensed to Portsmouth, but with a remote transmitter site located atop the middle peak of Saddleback Mountain. At a 1948 congressional hearing, Bert Georges, Vice President and general manager of WHEB, Inc., testified that: "I believe that FM is superior to AM and superior to any other aural service. I believe in years to come it will be the leading method of aural broadcasting. . . I believe that FM is here to stay, and I think it is going to supplement AM for a while and then definitely supplant it in the future." However, acceptance of FM was slow, and a local survey found that only 22 percent of homes had FM receivers. This in turn reduced the value and revenues of advertising, and when WFMI contracted sponsorship for a basketball tournament in March 1949, it was only able to charge 20 percent of the standard rate paid for WHEB. WFMI was deleted a few months later on August 25, 1949, at "Request of applicant".

=== WHEB-FM / WPFM / WHEB ===
The economics for FM stations had somewhat improved in the early 1960s, and Knight Broadcasting of New Hampshire started to make plans to return to the band. In March 1962, a fire destroyed the WHEB (AM) studios, and a year later operations moved into a newly built facility. In June 1962, Knight Broadcasting had filed an application for a new FM station in Portsmouth that was approved in December, and the new facility included studios for the not-yet-operating FM station.

The FM station was authorized for operation on 100.3 MHz. Assigned the call sign WHEB-FM, it began broadcasting on January 14, 1964, with a reported 60% duplication of programming of the AM station. The two stations simulcast a full service middle of the road (MOR) format, and the FM station allowed listeners to continue hearing programming after the AM station signed off for the day.

At first, WHEB-FM was authorized for an effective radiated power (ERP) of 5,650 watts, significantly less than its later output. In 1967 WHEB-FM changed its call sign to WPFM, while continuing to simulcast 750 WHEB most of the day. In 1971 the call letters were changed back to WHEB-FM.

In the early 1980s, WHEB-FM got an ERP boost to 31,000 watts, coupled with its own separate programming, a Top 40 format. The station adopted the nickname "The Star Station", and many listeners had a very popular yellow square sticker on their cars with a star in the middle and the call sign under it. In one promotion, this sticker could be used to get gas for 25 cents a gallon, causing long lines out onto Route 1. The AM station continued its full service MOR sound. Within a few years, WHEB-FM switched to an album rock format. The AM station, still only a 1,000–watt limited-time station, became a simulcast of WHEB-FM, for several more years.

In 1991, Knight Broadcasting decided the AM station was no longer needed, and was shut down, and the license handed in to the Federal Communications Commission for deletion. With the WHEB call sign no longer used on AM 750, WHEB-FM dropped the FM suffix from its call letters and became simply WHEB. (Portsmouth's other AM radio station, WMYF (1380 AM), was shut down in 2015; it by then had itself come under common ownership with WHEB.)

Also in the 1990s, 100.3 WHEB got a boost in its ERP to 50,000 watts, the maximum power permitted for most New Hampshire FM stations. In 2000, WHEB was acquired by Clear Channel Communications, the forerunner to iHeartMedia.

In August 2021, the station's property in Portsmouth, including its radio tower, was listed for sale at $3.6 million.
