= WGIR (AM) =

- Manchester, New Hampshire; United States
- Broadcast area: Southern New Hampshire
- Frequency: 610 kHz
- Branding: News Radio 610 WGIR

Programming
- Format: News/talk
- Affiliations: Fox News Radio; Compass Media Networks; Premiere Networks; New Hampshire Fisher Cats

Ownership
- Owner: iHeartMedia; (iHM Licenses, LLC)
- Sister stations: WGIR-FM

History
- First air date: October 2, 1941
- Former call signs: WMUR (1941–1956)
- Call sign meaning: Girolimon family (former owner)

Technical information
- Licensing authority: FCC
- Facility ID: 35237
- Class: B
- Power: 5,000 watts day; 1,000 watts night
- Transmitter coordinates: 43°0′57.3″N 71°28′46.24″W

Links
- Public license information: Public file; LMS
- Webcast: Listen live (via iHeartRadio)
- Website: wgiram.iheart.com

WGIR (610 kHz "News Radio 610") is a commercial AM radio station in Manchester, New Hampshire, with a news/talk radio format. The station is owned by iHeartMedia, Inc. WGIR's studios and offices are on Foundry Street in Manchester. Much of the programming and news, but not the commercials, can be heard on co-owned WQSO (96.7 MHz) in Rochester, serving the New Hampshire Seacoast.

The transmitter is on Stark Lane in Manchester, near Interstate 293 Exit 7. WGIR is powered at 5,000 watts by day; to avoid interfering with other stations on AM 610, it reduces power at night to 1,000 watts. It uses a directional antenna at all times.

== Programming ==
Weekdays begin with a local news and interview show, "New Hampshire Today", hosted by Chris Ryan, also heard on several other stations in the state. The rest of the schedule consists of nationally syndicated shows, including The Glenn Beck Program, The Clay Travis and Buck Sexton Show, The Sean Hannity Show, The Dave Ramsey Show, Coast to Coast AM with George Noory and This Morning, America's First News with Gordon Deal.

Weekend feature programs on money, health, law, technology and the Paul Parent Garden Club, as well as best-of editions of weekday programming. Some weekend shows are paid brokered programming. Syndicated weekend shows include The Tech Guy with Leo Laporte, Sunday Night Live with Bill Cunningham and Somewhere in Time with Art Bell. Most hours begin with world and national news from Fox News Radio, followed by New Hampshire news from local reporters.

WGIR is the flagship station of the New Hampshire Fisher Cats minor league baseball team. Additionally, WGIR is co-flagship of the Wildcat Sports Network along with WPKX and WQSO. The network airs college football, hockey and basketball from the University of New Hampshire.

== History ==
=== Early years ===
The station signed on the air on October 2, 1941, as WMUR, owned by former New Hampshire Governor Francis P. Murphy. WMUR was an affiliate of the NBC Blue Network. WMUR carried the Blue Network line up of dramas, comedies, news and sports during the "Golden Age of Radio". The Blue Network later became ABC Radio.

An FM sister station on 95.7 MHz was added on December 21, 1947, which largely simulcast the AM station. Plans for an FM station had been in place for seven years. However, few people owned FM radios at the time and management doubted the FM station would ever be profitable. WMUR-FM was shut down December 27, 1950. The frequency is now occupied by WZID.

=== WMUR-TV ===
A few years later, Murphy decided to apply for a television station on Channel 9. Murphy had to compete against applications from WFEA, WKBR, and the Manchester Union-Leader, the local daily newspaper headed by William Loeb III. Murphy won the construction permit, and WMUR-TV signed on March 28, 1954.

Because WMUR radio was an ABC affiliate, WMUR-TV picked up programming from the ABC Television Network. WMUR and WMUR-TV broadcast from a Victorian-style house on Elm Street in Manchester.

=== Change in ownership ===
Murphy decided to sell the WMUR stations in the mid-1950s, with Madeleine M. Girolimon acquiring WMUR radio for $150,000 in 1956 and changing the call sign to the current WGIR. (The WMUR call letters remain on channel 9, which stayed under Murphy's ownership until a few months after his death in 1958.) Girolimon dropped the ABC affiliation soon after taking over. WGIR picked up CBS Radio programming in 1957.

Girolimon sold WGIR to Knight Quality Stations in 1961. Around the same time, the station switched its network affiliation to NBC Radio. Under Knight, the station decided to reenter FM broadcasting, and WGIR-FM at 101.1 MHz signed on June 5, 1963. It largely simulcast the AM station in its early years. In 1977, the simulcast ended as WGIR-FM switched to a soft rock format.

=== Evolving to talk ===
Through the 1960s and 1970s, WGIR had a full service, middle of the road (MOR) format, mixed with some talk and sports programming. By the early 1980s, the station evolved its music programming to adult contemporary, while adding more talk shows. On December 31, 1984, WGIR ended all remaining music programming to become a full-time news/talk station. In 1990, the station swapped affiliations with WFEA and returned to ABC News Radio.

Knight Quality Stations announced the sale of its eight New England radio stations, including WGIR, to Capstar Broadcasting Partners in April 1997; upon assuming control in January 1998, the stations were operated by Capstar's Atlantic Star Communications subsidiary. That September, Capstar rebranded the station as the "Action News Network". In addition to broadcasting on AM 610, WGIR supplied programming to Seacoast radio stations 930 WZNN (renamed WGIN) and 1540 WMYF (renamed WGIP). WGIR switched networks again, this time dropping ABC and returning to NBC Radio. NBC radio news was subsequently phased out by Westwood One in favor of CNN Radio.

=== iHeart ownership ===
Capstar and Chancellor Media announced in August 1998 that they would merge (Hicks, Muse, Tate & Furst was a major shareholder in both companies); upon the merger's completion in July 1999, the combined company was named AMFM Inc. AMFM was in turn acquired by Clear Channel Communications (forerunner to iHeartMedia) in a deal announced on October 4, 1999, and completed in August 2000. For a time, Clear Channel added WGIR programming to a fourth station, WTSL 1400 AM in Hanover. WGIR picked up Fox News Radio for its news network in the mid-2000s after Clear Channel signed a larger agreement with the service.

WGIP left the network in 2009, after it was placed in the Aloha Station Trust and sold off due to the privatization of Clear Channel; it became classic hits-formatted WXEX, and is now K-Love station WPKC. WGIN also stopped carrying WGIR programming in April 2011, switching to sports programming. It became WPKX in February 2012. Most of WGIR's programming and news remains available on the Seacoast through sister station WQSO (96.7 FM).
