= WLVB =

Country music radio station in Morrisville, Vermont

- Morrisville, Vermont; United States
- Broadcast area: Lamoille County, Vermont
- Frequency: 93.9 MHz
- Branding: Vermont Country 93.9

Programming
- Format: Country

Ownership
- Owner: Myers Mermel, Caroline McLain, and Scott Milne; (WLVB Acquisition LLC)
- Sister stations: WDEV; WCVT

History
- First air date: 1993

Technical information
- Licensing authority: FCC
- Facility ID: 54868
- Class: A
- ERP: 5,400 watts
- HAAT: 37 meters (121 ft)
- Transmitter coordinates: 44°34′42.1″N 72°38′7.4″W

Links
- Public license information: Public file; LMS
- Website: www.wlvbradio.com

WLVB (93.9 FM, "Vermont Country 93.9") is a radio station licensed to serve Morrisville, Vermont. The station is owned by Myers Mermel, Caroline McLain, and Scott Milne, through licensee WLVB Acquisition LLC. It airs a country music format.

The station has been assigned these call letters by the Federal Communications Commission (FCC) since February 22, 1991.

WLVB was owned by Ken Squier until his death in 2023; in 2024, his family sold it and its sister stations—WDEV and WCVT—to Mermel, McLain, and Milne in a deal approved by the FCC in 2025.
