= WQSO =

- Rochester, New Hampshire; United States
- Broadcast area: Seacoast Region
- Frequency: 96.7 MHz (HD Radio)
- Branding: News Radio 96.7

Programming
- Format: News/talk
- Subchannels: HD2: "Pop Drive" (adult hits)
- Affiliations: Fox News Radio; Compass Media Networks; Premiere Networks

Ownership
- Owner: iHeartMedia, Inc.; (iHM Licenses, LLC)
- Sister stations: WERZ; WHEB; WPKX; WTBU

History
- First air date: October 21, 1979 (as WWNH-FM)
- Former call signs: WWNH-FM (1979–1983); WXKZ (1983–1986); WCYT (1986–1987); WKOS-FM (1987–1990); WWEM (1990–1995); WSRI (1995–1997)

Technical information
- Licensing authority: FCC
- Facility ID: 53388
- Class: A
- ERP: 3,000 watts
- HAAT: 100 meters (330 ft)
- Transmitter coordinates: 43°17′14.3″N 70°56′47.2″W

Links
- Public license information: Public file; LMS
- Webcast: Listen live (via iHeartRadio); HD2: Listen live (via iHeartRadio)
- Website: newsradio967.iheart.com

WQSO (96.7 FM) is a commercial radio station licensed to Rochester, New Hampshire, United States. The station is owned by iHeartMedia, Inc. and airs a news/talk format serving the Portsmouth-Dover-Rochester media market which also includes part of Southern Maine.

The transmitter is on Rochester Hill Road (New Hampshire Route 108) in Rochester. It has an effective radiated power (ERP) of 3,000 watts. WQSO broadcasts in the HD Radio hybrid format. The HD2 subchannel carries an adult hits format known as "Pop Drive".

== Programming ==
Nearly all programming heard on WQSO comes from sister station WGIR in Manchester, New Hampshire. WQSO separates from WGIR for its own local commercials and some weekend paid brokered programming. Weekdays begin with a news and interview show, New Hampshire Today, hosted by Chris Ryan, also heard on several other stations in the state. The rest of the schedule consists of nationally syndicated shows, including The Glenn Beck Program, The Clay Travis and Buck Sexton Show, The Sean Hannity Show, The Dave Ramsey Show, Ground Zero Radio with Clyde Lewis, Coast to Coast AM with George Noory and This Morning, America's First News with Gordon Deal.

Weekend feature programs on money, health, law, technology and the Paul Parent Garden Club, as well as best-of editions of weekday programming. Some weekend shows are paid brokered programming. Syndicated weekend shows include The Tech Guy with Leo Laporte, Sunday Night Live with Bill Cunningham and Somewhere in Time with Art Bell. Most hours begin with world and national news from Fox News Radio, followed by New Hampshire news from local reporters.

WQSO is co-flagship of the Wildcat Sports Network along with sister stations WPKX and WGIR. The network airs college football, hockey and basketball from the University of New Hampshire.

== History ==
On October 29, 1979, the station signed on as WWNH-FM. It changed its call sign to WXKZ in 1983, to WCYT in 1986, to WKOS-FM on December 18, 1987, and to WWEM on December 17, 1990.

In March 1994, the station adjusted its format slightly from adult contemporary to "The Perfect Mix of Soft Rock", playing soft rock and Americana music. The call sign was changed to WSRI on April 3, 1995, coinciding with a format flip to adult album alternative. The call letters were then changed to WQSO on September 29, 1997, coinciding with a format flip to oldies, mirroring sister station WQSR in Baltimore, also owned by American Radio Systems at that time. In the two weeks prior, the station had stunted by simulcasting its sister stations in Boston at different times of the day. The following spring, the stations of Precision Media were sold to Capstar Broadcasting.

On April 1, 2009, Clear Channel (now iHeartMedia) flipped WQSO from oldies to talk radio while keeping the “Wave” name. Most programs heard on WQSO were previously heard on WGIP (1540 AM) in Exeter, New Hampshire (a simulcast of WGIR in Manchester), before it was spun off by Clear Channel. On February 27, 2013, WQSO was rebranded as "News Radio 96.7" and began carrying a nearly identical schedule to WGIR.
