= WHEB (AM) =

Radio station in Portsmouth, New Hampshire (1932–1991)

- Portsmouth, New Hampshire; United States
- Broadcast area: Coastal New Hampshire and Maine
- Frequency: 750 kHz

Ownership
- Owner: Knight Broadcasting of New Hampshire, Inc.
- Sister stations: WHEB-FM

History
- First air date: 1932
- Last air date: 1991
- Former frequencies: 740 kHz (1932–1941)

Technical information
- Facility ID: 35220
- Power: 1,000 watts (limited hours)

WHEB was a limited-time AM radio station in Portsmouth, New Hampshire, which existed from 1932 until 1991, last owned by Knight Broadcasting. It signed on during the early days of broadcasting, and at the end of 1933 was one of only two active radio stations in the state of New Hampshire.

== History ==
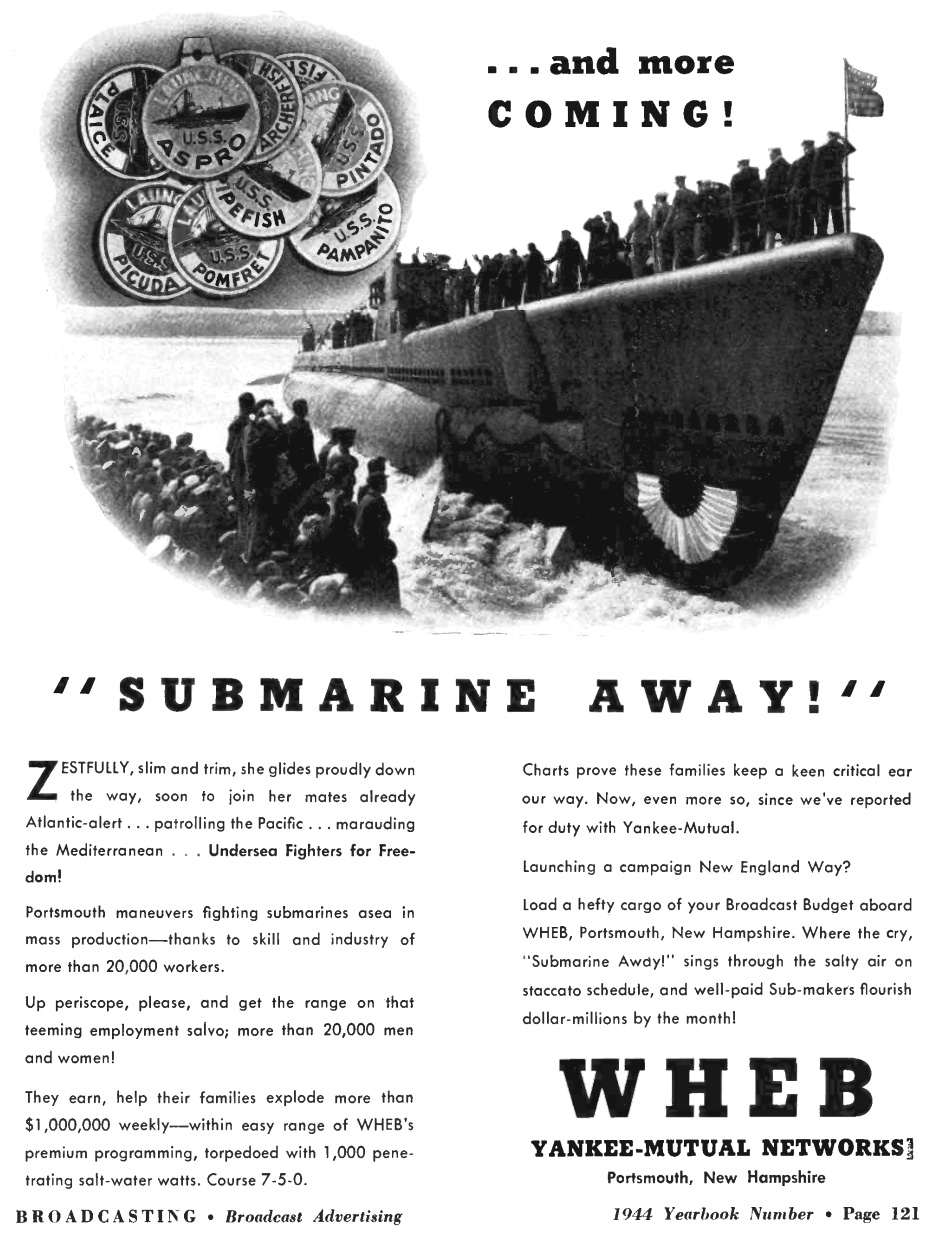
1944 advertisement for WHEB, reflecting that Portsmouth was a major shipbuilding center.

WHEB was first authorized on March 8, 1932, to Granite State Broadcasting in Portsmouth, for 250 watts on 740 kHz. The call sign randomly assigned from a sequential roster of available call signs. WHEB was originally licensed for only daytime operation, and generally required to go off the air at local sunset, in order to avoid nighttime interference to a clear channel station in Atlanta, 50,000-watt WSB.

In March 1941, under the provisions of the North American Regional Broadcasting Agreement, the stations on 740 kHz, including WHEB, moved to 750 kHz. At this time WHEB was also changed from a "daytime-only" to a "limited-time" station, which meant it could now additionally operate from local sunset until sunset at Atlanta.

During the first 60 days after the attack on Pearl Harbor on December 7, 1941, WHEB was permitted to operate with 250 watts power at night, unlimited time, because it was the only station located near one of the most important navy yards in the United States. On January 1, 1944, WHEB became affiliated with the Mutual and Yankee radio networks.

In 1948, the U.S. Congress held hearings reviewing the standards for stations operating on clear channel frequencies. These hearings included testimony by Bert Georges, Vice President and General Manager of WHEB, who stated: "I have asked for appearance at this hearing to give a specific case of how duplication of clear channels could improve the service to both rural and urban populations in my section of the country". (A counter proposal would have increased the dominance of primary clear channel stations, currently limited to powers of 50,000 watts, by allowing them to increase to up to 750,000 watts.) Georges reviewed the denial by WSB of permission to operate later than usual, with reduced power, in order to broadcast a local high school basketball tournament as an example of how "daytime stations operating on clear channels are limited in their service". Portsmouth is located almost 1,000 miles (1,600 km) from Atlanta, so Georges complained that the current standards protected clear channel stations far beyond where their listeners were actually located, and that requiring WHEB to sign off at night meant "In this case it happens to be preponderantly a rural audience which could be served in Maine and New Hampshire, at night, service which they are not now getting." Also that unlike distant stations, local broadcasters offered, "A real service... to the people in the way of their economic requirements, their news, their weather forecasts, their interest in local sports and so forth."

In 1959, WHEB was acquired by Knight Broadcasting of New Hampshire. In March 1962, a fire destroyed the station facilities. After spending a year in a temporary location at the New Hampshire National Bank, WHEB moved into replacement quarters "overlooking Sagamore Creek", with mayor John J. Wholey proclaiming March 8 to be "WHEB day".

In 1991, Knight Broadcasting decided the AM station was no longer needed, as most listeners could receive WHEB-FM in stereo on 100.3 FM, rather than listen to the weak AM station required to go off the air at night. WHEB AM 750 was shut down and the license returned to the Federal Communications Commission, which cancelled it on March 8, 1991. (Portsmouth's other AM radio station, WMYF (1380 AM), was shut down in 2015; WMYF was itself co-owned with WHEB (100.3 FM) by that point.)
