= WGCH =

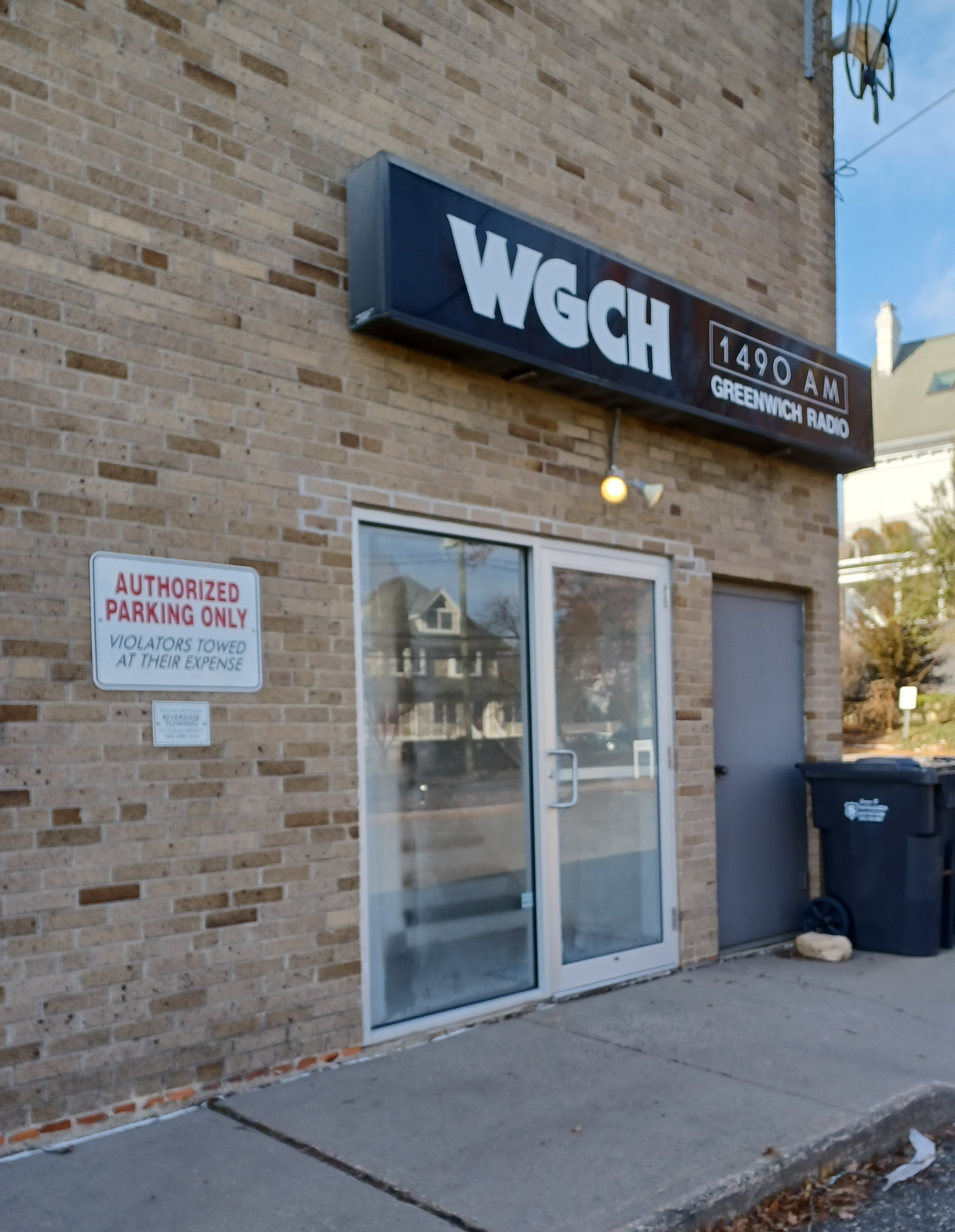
- Greenwich, Connecticut; United States
- Broadcast area: Fairfield County, Connecticut; Westchester County, New York
- Frequency: 1490 kHz
- Branding: News Talk AM 1490 WGCH

Programming
- Format: news/talk

Ownership
- Owner: Rocco and Susan Forte; (Forte Family Broadcasting, Inc.)

History
- First air date: September 15, 1964
- Call sign meaning: Greenwich

Technical information
- Licensing authority: FCC
- Facility ID: 65674
- Class: C
- Power: 1,000 watts unlimited
- Transmitter coordinates: 41°1′37″N 73°37′59″W

Links
- Public license information: Public file; LMS
- Webcast: Listen live (via TuneIn)
- Website: www.wgch.com

WGCH (1490 AM, "News Talk AM 1490") is a radio station licensed to serve Greenwich, Connecticut. The station is owned by Rocco and Susan Forte, through licensee Forte Family Broadcasting, Inc. It airs a News/Talk format.

The station was assigned the WGCH callsign by the Federal Communications Commission in 1964.
