= WPKZ =

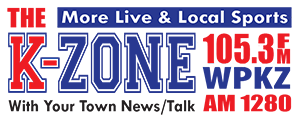
- Fitchburg, Massachusetts; United States
- Broadcast area: Montachusett-North County
- Frequency: 1280 kHz
- Branding: WPKZ AM 1280 and 105.3 FM

Programming
- Format: News/talk/sports
- Affiliations: Fox News Radio; Fox Sports Radio; Compass Media Networks; Premiere Networks; Radio America; Boston Red Sox Radio Network; New England Patriots Radio Network

Ownership
- Owner: John Morrison; (K-Zone Media Group, LLC)

History
- First air date: October 6, 1941
- Former call signs: WEIM (1941–2009)
- Call sign meaning: "K-Zone"

Technical information
- Licensing authority: FCC
- Facility ID: 71434
- Class: B
- Power: 5,000 watts day; 1,000 watts night
- Transmitter coordinates: 42°35′40.32″N 71°50′10.27″W
- Translator: 105.3 W287BT (Fitchburg)

Links
- Public license information: Public file; LMS
- Webcast: Listen live
- Website: wpkz.net

WPKZ (1280 AM) is a radio station broadcasting a news–talk and sports format and licensed to Fitchburg, Massachusetts, United States. The station is owned by John Morrison through licensee K-Zone Media Group, LLC, and features programming from Fox News Radio, Fox Sports Radio, Compass Media Networks, Premiere Networks, Radio America, and Westwood One. WPKZ's studios are located on Water Street in Fitchburg, across the street from the Wachusett Potato Chip Company factory; its transmitter is located on Alpine Road, also in Fitchburg.

== History ==
In 2001, Fillipone's WEIM Corp. sold to David Wang's LiveAir Communications, Inc. LiveAir changed format to news/talk/sports and began 24-hour programming, airing local, regional, and national talk. LiveAir sold the station in 2005 to Central Broadcasting Company, who returned music programming to the station and relaunched it as "AM 1280 The Blend" on October 2, 2006.

In 2007, longtime morning host Ray Chalifoux ("Ray C") concluded an over-30-year full-time run with the station. "Ray C" began a part-time stint as Public Service Director and co-host of the Saturday morning program Smart Shopper which he did from 2007 until his death on March 13, 2016. In November 2007, the station began airing a Spanish tropical format during the evening hours, branded "Mega 1280".

On April 6, 2009, after nearly 68 years as WEIM, the call sign was changed to WPKZ in anticipation of its new FM translator which went on the air on March 28, 2010, on a frequency of 105.3 MHz. The station remains mostly a news and talk station, with some sports programming. The station also discontinued its music programming (including the nighttime Spanish tropical format), with Fox Sports Radio being broadcast in the evening hours, except when professional sports run. WPKZ became one of several radio stations in New England to carry the New York Yankees in 2012; it had previously carried the Boston Red Sox for 45 years, but Entercom, owner of Red Sox flagship station WEEI, did not offer a renewal of WPKZ's contract. However, the Red Sox returned to the station the following season. An ownership change occurred in August 2015 when the station was purchased by an entity headed by John Morrison, a local businessman and owner of local baseball team the Wachusett Dirt Dawgs.

== Translators ==
Call sign	Frequency	City of license	FID	ERP (W)	HAAT	Class	Transmitter coordinates	FCC info
W287BT	105.3 FM	Fitchburg, Massachusetts	146879	150	80.6 m (264 ft)	D	42°35′40.3″N 71°50′10.2″W	LMS

After the callsign change to WPKZ, the owners bought a Gloucester translator, W245CD at 96.5 FM, and through a series of 13 location and frequency change filings, moved it to Fitchburg.
