= WCVR =

Radio station in Randolph, Vermont

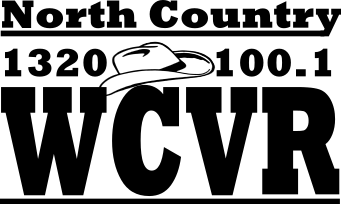
- Randolph, Vermont; United States
- Frequency: 1320 kHz
- Branding: North Country 1320

Programming
- Format: Country music
- Affiliations: USA Radio News; Bluegrass Radio Network

Ownership
- Owner: Robert Landry and John Landry; (Sugar River Media, LLC)
- Sister stations: WCFR; WCNL; WNTK-FM; WUVR

History
- First air date: November 26, 1968
- Former call signs: WCVR (1968–1987); WWWT (1987–2006); WTSJ (2006–2010)
- Call sign meaning: Central Vermont Radio

Technical information
- Licensing authority: FCC
- Facility ID: 63472
- Class: D
- Power: 1,000 watts day; 66 watts night
- Transmitter coordinates: 43°56′15.24″N 72°38′9.37″W
- Translator: 100.1 W261DJ (Randolph)

Links
- Public license information: Public file; LMS
- Webcast: Listen live
- Website: northcountry1320.com

WCVR (1320 AM) is a radio station broadcasting a hybrid country music format to Randolph, Vermont, United States. Established in 1968, the station is owned by Robert and John Landry, through licensee Sugar River Media.

== History ==
WCVR went on the air November 26, 1968. The station was initially a daytimer with a middle-of-the-road music format that leaned country. The original owners were Frank Gilman and Nelson Crawford, businessmen from White River Junction. Their original general manager was the prominent Vermont radio-newspaper commentator Bob Smith, who staffed the station with a program director from Burlington (Gary D'Arcangelo) and a morning man, Gene Puffer, who had operated a general store in a neighboring town. Puffer later purchased a radio station in Wells River, WYKR (now WTWN). The station struggled to gain traction with the local business community.

WCVR was sold during its first year in operation to Scott McQueen and Ted Nixon and Randy Odeneal, all Dartmouth College graduates who subsequently built Sconnix into a very successful ownership group.

Sconnix sold the station to Vermont Radio Group in 1976; in November 1980, WCVR was sold to Ed and Margaret Stokes. It had shifted to a more contemporary country format by 1982, when WCVR-FM was launched as an FM simulcast of the station. In 1987, the call letters were changed to WWWT; by 1988, the station carried an adult contemporary format, with the country format being heard solely on WCVR-FM. In the 1990s, WWWT returned to simulcasting WCVR-FM, which by then was receiving its programming via the Real Country network from ABC Radio (now Cumulus).

In 1999, the Stokes sold WWWT and WCVR-FM to Excalibur Media; Excalibur, in turn, was sold to Clear Channel Communications the following year. Soon after taking over, Clear Channel returned WWWT to separate programming, airing Jones Radio Networks' oldies service, Good Time Oldies. The station switched to a talk format in May 2003; initially a simulcast of WSYB in Rutland, it began to relay WTSL in Hanover, New Hampshire in 2006 (following Clear Channel's sale of WSYB), at which point the WTSJ call letters were adopted. A few months later, WTSL was also sold, and WTSJ again changed simulcasts, this time to WXZO and WEAV in the Champlain Valley.

In January 2008, Clear Channel agreed to sell its Vermont stations to Vox Communications as part of Clear Channel's plan to divest itself of most of its smaller market radio stations. The sale was completed July 25, 2008. Vox soon concluded that it had no interest in retaining WTSJ and WCVR-FM, and reached a deal to sell the stations to Great Eastern Radio in September 2008. Great Eastern switched WTSJ to a simulcast of Lebanon, New Hampshire country station WXXK. However, it never closed on the deal, and a year later Vox retook the station and reinstated the simulcast of WEAV.

In March 2010, another deal to sell WTSJ, this time to Koor Communications, was reached. Koor took over the station on March 12, and reverted the station to Real Country. The WCVR call letters were reinstated on April 23, and the sale was finalized on June 25.

On February 3, 2017, WCVR was purchased by Sugar River Media, LLC. As of April 2017, the station has been re-branded as "North Country 1320".

== Programming ==
Since March 31, 2017, at 8:00 p.m. local time, most programming on WCVR is generated locally. According to the station's website, music programming is a blend of country and roots music with CBS News Radio at the top of every hour.

== Translator ==
Call sign	Frequency	City of license	FID	ERP (W)	Class	Transmitter coordinates	FCC info
W261DJ	100.1 FM	Randolph, Vermont	153209	250	D	43°57′11.8″N 72°35′56.7″W	LMS
