= WWNH =

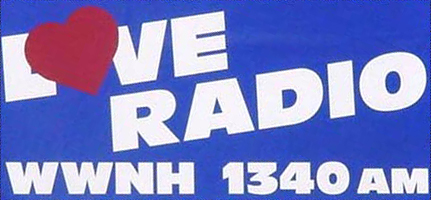
- Madbury, New Hampshire; United States
- Broadcast area: Dover, New Hampshire
- Frequency: 1340 kHz
- Branding: Love 1340

Programming
- Language: English

Ownership
- Owner: Brian Dodge; (Harvest Broadcasting)
- Sister stations: WTIJ

History
- First air date: May 20, 1989
- Last air date: June 2010

Technical information
- Facility ID: 26343
- Class: C
- Power: 250 watts
- Transmitter coordinates: 43°10′22.3″N 70°54′58.2″W

WWNH (1340 AM, "Love 1340") was an American radio station authorized to serve the community of Madbury, New Hampshire, United States. WWNH broadcast a contemporary Christian music format to the Dover, New Hampshire, area. The station was owned by Brian Dodge and the construction permit was held by Harvest Broadcasting.

== History ==
The application for a new AM radio station to serve Madbury, New Hampshire, with the Federal Communications Commission (FCC) was filed in September 1987 by Harvest Broadcasting. This application was accepted for processing on February 25, 1988. The original construction permit for the station was granted on November 10, 1988, with a scheduled expiration date on May 10, 1990. The station was assigned the call sign "WWNH" by the FCC on January 30, 1989.

WWNH first went on the air May 20, 1989; it applied for its license to cover on June 26, 1989, and the FCC accepted the application for filing on the same day. However, Harvest Broadcasting had applied to the FCC in January 1989 for permission to move their transmitter location to its current location. The FCC granted the new construction permit on March 8, 1990, with a scheduled September 8, 1990, expiration date.

WWNH operated under program test authority from the FCC pending further action on its application for a broadcast license. In the late 1990s, the station operated from "a run-down prefab house" in Madbury.

After more than 20 years of unlicensed operation, WWNH fell silent in June 2010. The station's license application was dismissed on August 8, 2017, after Brian Dodge did not comply with the terms of an October 2016 consent decree involving violations at other stations he controlled; the WWNH construction permit was concurrently cancelled.
