= WUVR =

- Lebanon, New Hampshire; United States
- Broadcast area: Lebanon-Hanover-White River Junction area
- Frequency: 1490 kHz

Programming
- Format: News/talk
- Affiliations: Westwood One; Premiere Radio Networks; Fox News Radio

Ownership
- Owner: Robert Landry and John Landry; (Sugar River Media, LLC)
- Sister stations: WCFR; WCNL; WCVR; WNTK-FM

History
- First air date: November 19, 2004
- Call sign meaning: Upper Valley Radio

Technical information
- Licensing authority: FCC
- Facility ID: 129862
- Class: C
- Power: 640 watts
- Transmitter coordinates: 43°39′12.3″N 72°14′14.3″W
- Translator: 98.9 W255CF (West Lebanon)

Links
- Public license information: Public file; LMS
- Webcast: Listen live
- Website: www.wuvrradio.com

WUVR (1490 AM) is a radio station licensed to Lebanon, New Hampshire, serving the Lebanon-Hanover-White River Junction area. It broadcasts a news/talk format and is owned by Robert and John Landry, through licensee Sugar River Media, LLC.

== History ==
This station received its original construction permit from the Federal Communications Commission on September 2, 2004. The new station was assigned the WUVR call sign by the FCC on September 20, 2004; it signed on November 19 as a simulcast of WNTK-FM 99.7. The station received its license to cover from the FCC on January 26, 2005.
