= WNTK-FM =

- New London, New Hampshire; United States
- Broadcast area: Lebanon-Hanover-White River Junction area
- Frequency: 99.7 MHz
- Branding: News Talk 99.7 WNTK

Programming
- Format: News/talk
- Affiliations: Fox News Radio; Genesis Communications Network; USA Radio Network; Westwood One

Ownership
- Owner: Robert Landry and John Landry; (Sugar River Media, LLC)
- Sister stations: WCFR; WCNL; WCVR; WUVR

History
- First air date: November 28, 1992 (as WRJE)
- Former call signs: WRJE (1992)
- Call sign meaning: "News Talk"

Technical information
- Licensing authority: FCC
- Facility ID: 35407
- Class: A
- ERP: 1,450 watts
- HAAT: 206 meters (676 ft)
- Transmitter coordinates: 43°26′54.3″N 72°2′2.3″W

Links
- Public license information: Public file; LMS
- Webcast: Listen live
- Website: www.wntk.com

WNTK-FM (99.7 MHz) is a commercial radio station broadcasting a news/talk radio format. Licensed to New London, New Hampshire, the station serves the Lebanon-Hanover-White River Junction area of New Hampshire and Vermont. The station is currently owned by Robert and John Landry, through licensee Sugar River Media, LLC, and features local morning programs, as well as nationally syndicated conservative talk shows. Much of the programming is also simulcast on co-owned WUVR (1490 AM) and its FM translator at 98.9 MHz in Lebanon, New Hampshire.

== Programming ==
Weekdays begin with a local wake up news and information show. Afternoons feature two Boston-based shows, Grace Curley and Howie Carr. The rest of the schedule comes from national hosts from the Westwood One network: Chris Plante, Mark Levin, Jim Bohannon, Red Eye Radio and America in the Morning.

Weekends feature shows on money, health, home repair, cars, the law, travel, the outdoors, gardening, guns, and pets. Weekend syndicated hosts include Dan Bongino, Ben Shapiro, Bruce DuMont and Bill Cunningham. The station carries Boston Red Sox baseball. Most hours begin with updates from Fox News Radio.

== History ==
The station was assigned the call sign WRJE on October 9, 1992, and went on the air November 28.

On December 28, 1992, the station changed its call sign to WNTK-FM. It was carried on WCNL (then known as WNTK, at 1010 AM) before WCNL changed to its current country music format.
