= WXLF =

- Hartford, Vermont; United States
- Broadcast area: Lebanon/Hanover, New Hampshire and White River Junction, Vermont
- Frequency: 95.3 MHz
- Branding: 95.3 and 107.1 The Wolf

Programming
- Format: Country
- Affiliations: Compass Media Networks

Ownership
- Owner: Binnie Media; (WBIN Media Co., Inc.)
- Sister stations: WZLF

History
- First air date: February 1, 1969 (as WNHV-FM)
- Former call signs: WNHV-FM (1969–1985); WKXE-FM (1985–1998); WWSH (1998–2001); WSSH (2001–2005)
- Call sign meaning: "Wolf"

Technical information
- Licensing authority: FCC
- Facility ID: 17801
- Class: A
- ERP: 6,000 watts
- HAAT: 87 meters (285 ft)
- Transmitter coordinates: 43°39′14.3″N 72°17′42.3″W

Links
- Public license information: Public file; LMS
- Webcast: Listen live
- Website: 953thewolf.com

WXLF (95.3 FM, "95.3 and 107.1 The Wolf") is a radio station licensed to serve Hartford, Vermont. The station is owned by Binnie Media. It airs a country music format. The station is simulcast on WZLF (107.1 FM) in Bellows Falls, Vermont.

The station has been assigned these call letters by the Federal Communications Commission since March 1, 2005.

== History ==
WXLF started in 1969 as WNHV-FM, a simulcast of its daytime-only sister WNHV (910 AM) owned by television announcer and Reynolds Aluminum spokesman Rex Marshall. Eventually the signals were split and WNHV-FM became WKXE-FM, otherwise known as "95-3 KXE", with a very eclectic presentation of the adult album alternative format, with elements by day, and entire programs by night, presenting blues, jazz, folk, Celtic and world music by popular local hosts Beth Phinney, Steve Niederhauser, Rodger Collins, musician Claudine Langille and others.

In the Upper Valley's first duopoly, WKXE and WNHV were sold to Dynacom Corporation, who also owned WHDQ (106.1 FM) and WTSV (1230 AM) in Claremont, New Hampshire. Amid huge protest, Dynacom flipped the AAA station to a soft adult contemporary format as "Lite 95-3". Over time, "Lite 95-3" evolved into "Wish"; in 1998, the call letters were changed to WWSH. "Wish" was initially a 'trimulcast' of WKXE/WWSH, WZSH (107.1 FM) in Bellows Falls, and WSSH (101.5 FM) in Marlboro. The WSSH signal served the Brattleboro area, and maintained a sales office and FCC legal studio on Main Street in downtown Brattleboro. For a time in 1997, "Wish" programming was added to a fourth station, WVAY (100.7 FM, now WTHK) in Wilmington, Vermont, which subsequently began to simulcast the AAA format of WRSI in Greenfield, Massachusetts, as WMTT. In 2001, shortly after Vox Radio Group acquired the "Wish" stations, WSSH became WRSY, simulcasting WRSI (serving the same function WVAY/WMTT had done in bringing its AAA programming to Brattleboro before WVAY changed to a simulcast of WEXP); the WSSH call letters were then moved to the White River Junction station. WSSH and WZSH subsequently dropped the AC format and went to country and took the "Bob Country" handle formerly used by WMXR (93.9 FM, now WWOD) in Woodstock and WCFR-FM (93.5 FM) in Springfield (now WEEY in Swanzey, New Hampshire) prior to their purchase by Clear Channel Communications, owner of competing country station WXXK (100.5 FM). After Vox sold WSSH and WZSH to Nassau Broadcasting Partners, the "Bob Country" branding was dropped in favor of "The Wolf".

Its signature voice is John Willyard, voice of the CMA Awards since 1996, whose signature voice work is heard on many notable Country stations across North America.

WXLF, along with 16 other Nassau stations in northern New England, was purchased at bankruptcy auction by WBIN Media Company, a company controlled by Bill Binnie, on May 22, 2012. Binnie already owned WBIN-TV in Derry, New Hampshire. The deal was completed on November 30, 2012.

== Personalities ==
Big D & Bubba host the morning show, syndicated from Nashville, Tennessee. Harrison Hinman is heard middays. Michelle Taylor hosts afternoons.
