= WTSL =

- Hanover, New Hampshire; United States
- Broadcast area: Lebanon-Hanover-White River Junction
- Frequency: 1400 kHz
- Branding: The Penguin

Programming
- Format: Adult hits
- Affiliations: CBS News Radio

Ownership
- Owner: Great Eastern Radio, LLC
- Sister stations: WFYX; WHDQ; WGXL; WWOD; WTSV; WXXK

History
- First air date: October 1950
- Last air date: December 17, 2024
- Call sign meaning: Twin State Lebanon

Technical information
- Licensing authority: FCC
- Facility ID: 12083
- Class: C
- Power: 1,000 watts unlimited
- Transmitter coordinates: 43°41′3.26″N 72°17′44.33″W
- Translators: 97.5 W248DA (Hanover); 101.7 W269DI (Claremont)
- Repeaters: 96.3 WFYX (Walpole); 106.1 WHDQ-HD2 (Claremont)

Links
- Public license information: Public file; LMS
- Webcast: Listen live
- Website: www.thepenguinradio.com

WTSL (1400 AM) was a commercial radio station licensed to Hanover, New Hampshire, United States. It aired an adult hits radio format and served the Lebanon-Hanover-White River Junction area. The station was owned by Great Eastern Radio, LLC. WTSL also had broadcast Dartmouth College Big Green football and hockey games.

Listeners could also hear WTSL programming on FM translator stations W248DA at 97.5 MHz in Hanover and W269DI at 101.7 in Claremont, as well as on the second HD subchannel of WHDQ. The stations called themselves "The Penguin".

== History ==
In October 1950, WTSL first signed on. It was owned by Granite State Broadcasters and was powered at only 250 watts, a network affiliate of the Mutual Broadcasting System. In 1961, the daytime power was increased to 1,000 watts. In the 1980s, the nighttime power was also boosted to 1,000 watts.

In June 1970, the station was acquired by Tri City Broadcasting from Knight Quality Stations. Sound Citizens Communications bought the station in 1974. Up to this time, WTSL carried the NBC Radio Network news and music show Monitor, along with Boston Red Sox baseball, via an over-the-air feed from WGIR-FM in Manchester and WTSV-FM in Claremont. It aired a middle of the road music format. In the 1970s, WTSL dropped NBC, adding the CBS Radio Network and later, returning to the Mutual Broadcasting System as a secondary affiliation. This change would allow WTSL to switch from overnight music to Larry King's Mutual talk show.

After a period with Mutual, WTSL was asked to become its primary affiliate in the Lebanon–Hanover market, but turned it down. Mutual then moved to WNHV AM–FM in White River Junction, Vermont, and WTSL joined ABC; this allowed the station to add Paul Harvey, which had been on WNHV. During this period of time, the studios were located at its transmitter site on Oak Ridge Road in West Lebanon, New Hampshire. The studios were subsequently moved to downtown Lebanon mall along with sister station WTSL-FM (now WGXL). Several owners later, the station was purchased by Robert Frisch, owner of WXXK (originally on 101.7 FM; later moving to 100.5 with the purchase of that facility) By this period of time, WTSL was a talk radio station with a strong local news presentation, including major newscasts in drive time and at noon. Mountain View Broadcasting held onto WTSL, as well as WGXL, WXXK and WVRR (the old WXXK facility at 101.7) property until their sale to Clear Channel Communications (now iHeartMedia) in 2000. During the time, WTSL held onto the rights to Red Sox baseball (since then baseball has moved to sister station WWOD).

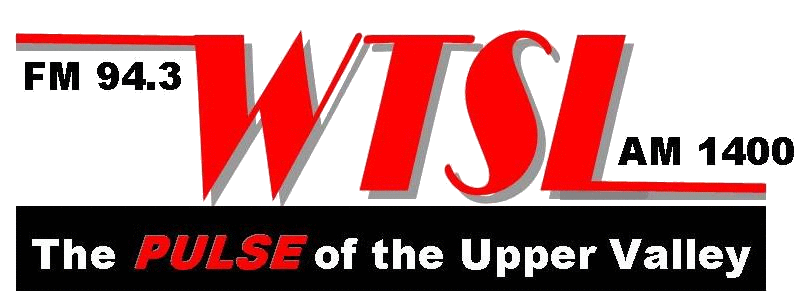
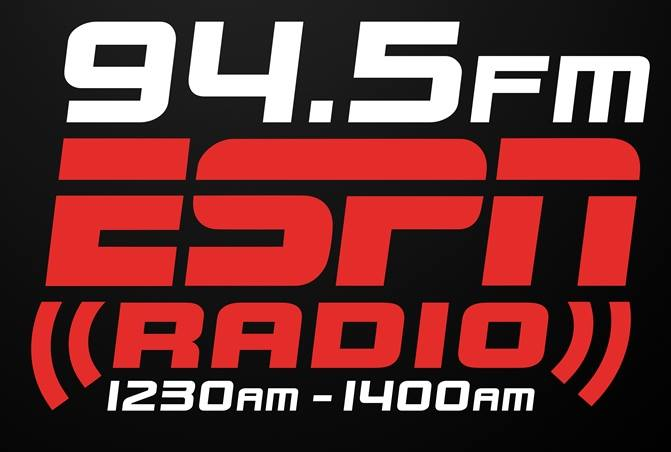
Logos used while simulcasting with WTSV

Clear Channel continued the talk radio format, while adding Rush Limbaugh, taking the program from WNTK-FM. Rush stayed on WTSL until it was sold again in 2007 to Great Eastern Radio. Rush returned to WNTK, which had now began WUVR. Great Eastern flipped it to a sports radio format, simulcast with Claremont sister station WTSV, using the ESPN Radio Network.

On June 12, 2018, WTSL dropped the ESPN sports format and began stunting with "Rapper's Delight" by the Sugarhill Gang, in preparation of launching new translator W248DA (97.5 FM); the sports format continued on WTSV. On June 21, 2018, the stunting ended, with WTSL and W248DA changing format to classic hip hop, branded as "Hot 97.5".

On July 29, 2022, WTSL dropped the classic hip hop format and flipped to adult hits, branded as "97.5 & 101.7 The Penguin"; with this format change, the station began simulcasting on the second HD subchannel of WHDQ (the former WTSV-FM), along with a Claremont translator, W269DI (101.7 FM).

WTSL went silent on December 17, 2024, after losing the lease on its transmitter site. The Federal Communications Commission cancelled the station's license on January 26, 2026.

== Translators ==
Broadcast translators for WTSL
Call sign	Frequency	City of license	FID	ERP (W)	Class	Transmitter coordinates	FCC info
W248DA	97.5 FM	Hanover, New Hampshire	200453	18	D	43°39′16.7″N 72°17′39.9″W	LMS
W269DI	101.7 FM	Claremont, New Hampshire	46339	150	D	43°23′45.2″N 72°17′38.3″W	LMS
