= WTHK =

Classic rock radio station in Wilmington, Vermont

Simulcast of WTSA-FM, Brattleboro
- Wilmington, Vermont; United States
- Frequency: 100.7 MHz
- Branding: Magic 96.7

Programming
- Format: Adult contemporary
- Affiliations: Compass Media Networks

Ownership
- Owner: Community Media LLC
- Sister stations: WEEY; WFYX; WKKN; WTSA; WTSA-FM

History
- First air date: June 1, 1989 (as WVAY)
- Former call signs: WVAY (1989–1999); WMTT (1999–2000); WVAY (2000–2006)
- Call sign meaning: "The Peak" (previous branding)

Technical information
- Licensing authority: FCC
- Facility ID: 57728
- Class: A
- ERP: 130 watts
- HAAT: 452 meters (1,483 ft)
- Transmitter coordinates: 42°57′33.2″N 72°55′20.3″W
- Translator: 104.7 W284AB (Jamaica)

Links
- Public license information: Public file; LMS
- Webcast: Listen live
- Website: www.magic967.com

WTHK (100.7 FM) is a radio station licensed to Wilmington, Vermont. The station is owned by Community Media, and simulcasts the Adult Contemporary format on WTSA-FM. WTHK's transmitter is located atop Mount Snow in West Dover, Vermont.

== History ==
WTHK began its radio life as WVAY. The station was part of the wave of upscale smooth jazz formatted stations that were very trendy in the mid to late 1980s. The station was owned and operated by Rothschild Broadcasting. Founding program director Roger Coryell left the station in 1990 for a position as morning host on San Francisco smooth jazz outlet KKSF. WVAY's slogan evolved from "Smooth Sounds - 100.7 WVAY" to "100.7 WVAY, Different by Design" as the station evolved into more of a triple-A formatted radio station. At one time WVAY also had additional translators at 99.7 in Marlboro, Vermont, which was sold to Harvest Broadcasting, a religious broadcaster, and had an arrangement to operate a translator W261CE at the peak Mt. Equinox at 100.1 which helped WVAY have a stronger signal in Manchester, Vermont. At one time WVAY was positioned as "100.7/100.1 WVAY Different By Design".

The station was sold to Dynacom Corporation in 1998, and wound up having many simulcast partners of the Dynacom stable which included being part of the soft AC, "Wish" stations (now WXLF), and AOR formatted Q 106 (WHDQ) from Claremont, New Hampshire. Eventually the simulcast partner became WRSI (then at 95.3 FM), an AAA station from Greenfield, Massachusetts. The WVAY call letters were shelved in favor of WMTT during this time. In October 2000, the WRSI simulcast with WMTT ended and was moved to WRSY (101.5 FM) in Marlboro, which had a better signal into Brattleboro, yet continued to serve the Deerfield Valley. WMTT's new simulcast partner became WEXP (101.5 FM) from Brandon, Vermont, and together the stations were known on air as "Classic Rock 101, The Fox". It was at that time that the WVAY call sign were restored to 100.7.

In 2004 Nassau Broadcasting Partners purchased WEXP and WVAY as well as an entire portfolio of radio stations in Vermont and New Hampshire from the Vox Radio Group. While the station has evolved into "Rutland's Rock Station, 101.5 The Fox", the WVAY call sign went away again in favor of Nassau's warehousing of the WTHK call sign on November 16, 2006, where they remain to this day. The call sign was previously used on 97.5 FM in Trenton, New Jersey.

WTHK, along with 29 other Nassau stations in northern New England, was purchased at bankruptcy auction by Carlisle Capital Corporation, a company controlled by Bill Binnie (owner of WBIN-TV in Derry), on May 22, 2012. The station, and 12 of the other stations, would then be acquired by Vertical Capital Partners, controlled by Jeff Shapiro; however, WTHK was not included in the subsequent sale of simulcast partner WEXP to Electromagnetic Company. The sale of WTHK and the other 12 stations was consummated on November 30, 2012, at a purchase price of $4.4 million. The Vertical Capital Partners stations were transferred to Shapiro's existing Great Eastern Radio group on January 1, 2013. On January 22, 2013, WTHK dropped its simulcast of WEXP and began simulcasting new sister station WXXK (100.5 FM).

The WXXK simulcast ended on March 16, 2015, when WTHK, along with WKKN in Westminster (a station in the Keene, New Hampshire, area that had also been serving as a WXXK simulcast), launched an adult album alternative format branded as "The Peak." Under the new format, the WTHK signal is marketed to the Bennington area. The stations switched to a classic rock format on May 14, 2018, while retaining the "Peak" branding.

In April 2026, Jared Goodell's Community Media LLC, owner of WTSA and WTSA-FM in Brattleboro, Vermont, purchased Great Eastern Radio's Brattleboro–Keene cluster–WTHK and translator W284AB; WKKN; WEEY; and WFYX–for $850,000. Upon taking over in June 2026, Community Media discontinued the "Peak" format and WKKN's simulcast on WTHK.

On June 30, 2026, WTHK switched to a simulcast of WTSA-FM.

== Translator ==
WTHK also operates translator station W284AB (Jamaica, Vermont) that transmits a directional signal from the top of Stratton Mountain. The translator can be heard at 104.7 FM.

Broadcast translator for WTHK
| Call sign | Frequency | City of license | FID | ERP (W) | HAAT | Class | Transmitter coordinates | FCC info |
|---|---|---|---|---|---|---|---|---|
| W284AB | 104.7 FM | Jamaica, Vermont | 57729 | 10 | 654 m (2,146 ft) | D | 43°5′45.2″N 72°55′14.3″W | LMS |
