= WFYX =

Simulcast of WEEY, Swanzey
- Walpole, New Hampshire; United States
- Broadcast area: Monadnock Region; Upper Valley
- Frequency: 96.3 MHz
- Branding: Country 93.5

Programming
- Language: English
- Format: Country

Ownership
- Owner: Community Media LLC
- Sister stations: WEEY; WKKN; WTHK; WTSA; WTSA-FM

History
- First air date: January 2001
- Former call signs: WLPL (1991–2001); WCFR-FM (2001–2005); WPLY-FM (2005–2008)

Technical information
- Licensing authority: FCC
- Facility ID: 23307
- Class: A
- ERP: 320 watts
- HAAT: 124 meters (407 ft)
- Transmitter coordinates: 43°8′14.2″N 72°25′57.3″W

Links
- Public license information: Public file; LMS
- Webcast: Listen live
- Website: www.country935.com

WFYX (96.3 FM) is a radio station broadcasting an country music format. Licensed to Walpole, New Hampshire, United States, it serves the Monadnock Region in Southwestern New Hampshire and Southeastern Vermont. It first began broadcasting in 2001 under the call sign WLPL. The station is owned by Community Media. Programming is simulcast with WEEY (93.5 FM) in Swanzey.

== History ==
The station went on the air in January 2001 as WLPL, owned by Gary Savoie and simulcasting Vox Radio Group-owned oldies station WWOD (104.3 FM). WLPL's sign on was delayed when environmental objections prevented the station from building a tower in Athens, Vermont; it chose to transmit from an existing tower in New Hampshire. The call letters were changed to WCFR-FM on October 19, shortly after they were dropped from WXKK (93.5 FM, now WEEY); soon afterward, Savoie sold the station to Vox. Nassau Broadcasting Partners acquired most of Vox's northern New England radio stations, including WCFR and WWOD, in 2004. WCFR-FM's call letters were changed to WPLY-FM on October 12, 2005, then to WFYX on October 7, 2008.

WFYX, WWOD, and 28 other Nassau stations in northern New England were purchased at bankruptcy auction by Carlisle Capital Corporation, a company controlled by Bill Binnie (owner of WBIN-TV in Derry), on May 22, 2012. The stations, and 11 of the other stations, were then acquired by Vertical Capital Partners, controlled by Great Eastern Radio owner Jeff Shapiro. As this would put Shapiro over the U.S. Federal Communications Commission's (FCC) ownership limits in the Lebanon-Rutland-White River Junction market, WWOD and WEXP were acquired by Electromagnetic Company, a company controlled by William and Gail Goddard; WFYX was not included in that transaction. As a result, on December 1, 2012, WFYX began to simulcast classic hits station WMXR (93.9 FM, now WWOD), while 104.3 FM left the air (that station is now WJKS in Keeseville, New York). The Vertical Capital Partners stations were transferred to Great Eastern Radio on January 1, 2013.

On January 9, 2013, WFYX was granted an FCC construction permit to increase ERP to 600 watts. On July 7, 2016, Dartmouth College announced that WWOD and WFYX would be the new carriers of Big Green men's and women's basketball broadcasts as part of the Big Green Sports Network / Learfield Sports.

On November 1, 2017, Great Eastern Radio transferred the "Kool FM" programming, which by then had shifted to an oldies format provided by Scott Shannon's True Oldies Channel, from WWOD to WHDQ-HD2 and W294AB; the format continued to simulcast on WFYX.

On October 1, 2024, WFYX and its simulcasts dropped the oldies format for adult hits, branded as "The Penguin". The "Penguin" programming was already available in the market via WTSL (1400 AM and 97.5 FM) in Hanover and W269DI (101.7 FM) in Claremont.

In April 2026, Jared Goodell's Community Media LLC, owner of WTSA and WTSA-FM in Brattleboro, Vermont, purchased Great Eastern Radio's Brattleboro–Keene cluster–WFYX and translator W293AB; WEEY; WKKN; and WTHK–for $850,000. Upon completing the sale in June 2026, Community Media replaced "The Penguin" on WFYX with a simulcast of the country music format that had concurrently moved from WTSA to WEEY, while W293AB shifted from "The Penguin" to relaying WTSA's new all-news format.
