= WTSV =

- Claremont, New Hampshire; United States
- Broadcast area: Dartmouth–Lake Sunapee Region
- Frequency: 1230 kHz
- Branding: 94 WEEI

Programming
- Format: Sports
- Affiliations: WEEI Sports Radio Network; ESPN Radio; Boston Red Sox Radio Network; New England Patriots Radio Network

Ownership
- Owner: Great Eastern Radio, LLC
- Sister stations: WGXL; WHDQ; WWOD; WXXK

History
- First air date: 1948
- Call sign meaning: Twin State Valley

Technical information
- Licensing authority: FCC
- Facility ID: 17795
- Class: C
- Power: 1,000 watts unlimited
- Transmitter coordinates: 43°22′15.3″N 72°19′40.3″W
- Translators: 94.3 W232DN (Claremont); 94.5 W233CC (White River Junction, Vermont)
- Repeater: 92.3 WGXL-HD2 (Hanover)

Links
- Public license information: Public file; LMS
- Webcast: Listen live
- Website: www.weeinh.com

WTSV (1230 AM; "94 WEEI") is a radio station broadcasting a sports format. Licensed to Claremont, New Hampshire, United States, the station serves the Dartmouth–Lake Sunapee Region. The station is owned by Jeffrey Shapiro's Great Eastern Radio. Most of the station's programming is simulcast from Boston sports radio station WEEI-FM. WTSV's programming is also carried on two FM translators, W232DN (94.3 FM) in Claremont, and W233CC (94.5 FM) in White River Junction, Vermont.

The station's call letters stand for Twin State Valley, as the station serves the Connecticut River Valley of New Hampshire and Vermont. It was built by the original owners of WKBR in Manchester as part of a chain of "Twin State Network" stations, which also included WTSL in Hanover, WTSA in Brattleboro, and WTSN in Dover.

== History ==
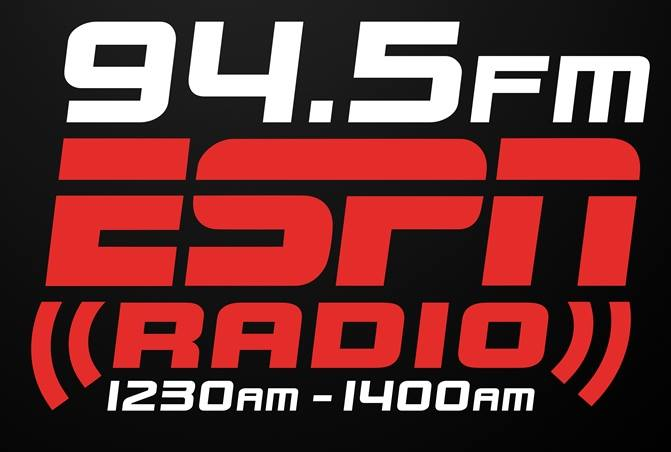

Logos as an ESPN Radio affiliate

WTSV, along with 29 other stations in northern New England formerly owned by Nassau Broadcasting Partners, was purchased at bankruptcy auction by Carlisle Capital Corporation, a company controlled by Bill Binnie (owner of WBIN-TV in Derry), on May 22, 2012. The station, and 12 of the other stations, were then acquired by Vertical Capital Partners, controlled by Jeff Shapiro; this reunited WTSV with WTSL, which Shapiro already owned via Great Eastern Radio. After the sale's completion on November 30, 2012, WTSV dropped its sports radio format from ESPN Radio and began simulcasting WTSL, which at the time carried a news/talk format branded as "The Pulse". The Vertical Capital Partners stations were transferred to Great Eastern Radio on January 1, 2013. By March 2014, when WTSL translator W232AP moved from 94.3 to 94.5, WTSV had returned to an ESPN-supplied all-sports format, still simulcast with WTSL; its lineup also included Boston Bruins hockey and high school sports.

On July 7, 2016, Dartmouth College announced that WTSV would carry Big Green football, men's hockey and women's hockey broadcasts as part of Learfield's Big Green Sports Network. WTSL left the "94.5 ESPN" simulcast in June 2018, when it used a new translator to launch a classic hip hop format; the sports programming continued on WTSV and the two existing translators, with W233CC now being fed by WHDQ 106.1-HD3. In September 2020, WTSV relaunched the sports format as an affiliate of the WEEI Sports Radio Network, based out of WEEI-FM in Boston; Great Eastern Radio already carried WEEI programming on WEEY in the adjacent Keene market.
