= WTSA (disambiguation) =

WTSA is the World Telecommunication Standardization Assembly

WTSA may also refer to:

- WTSA (AM), a radio station (1450 AM) licensed to Brattleboro, Vermont, United States
- WTSA-FM, a radio station (96.7 FM) licensed to Brattleboro, Vermont, United States
