= WMMJ (disambiguation) =

WMMJ is a radio station (102.3 FM) licensed to Bethesda, Maryland.

WMMJ may also refer to:

- WPEO, a radio station (1020 AM) licensed to Peoria, Illinois, which held the call sign WMMJ from 1946 to 1949
- WXRL, a radio station (1300 AM) licensed to Lancaster, New York, which held the call sign WMMJ from 1965 to 1970
- WTSA-FM, a radio station (96.7 FM) licensed to Brattleboro, Vermont, which held the call sign WMMJ from 1978 to 1984
- WTSA (AM), a radio station (1450 AM) licensed to Brattleboro, Vermont, which held the call sign WMMJ from 1984 to 1986
