= North Westminster, Vermont =

Census-designated place in Vermont, United States

- Census-designated place
- Location within Vermont Location within the United States
- Coordinates: 43°07′25″N 72°27′25″W
- Country: United States
- State: Vermont
- County: Windham

Area
  - Total: 0.35 sq mi (0.9 km^{2})
  - Land: 0.35 sq mi (0.9 km^{2})
  - Water: 0 sq mi (0.0 km^{2})
- Elevation: 486 ft (148 m)

Population (2020)
  - Total: 262
  - Density: 750/sq mi (290/km^{2})
- Time zone: UTC-5 (Eastern (EST))
  - Summer (DST): UTC-4 (EDT)
- ZIP Codes: 05101 (Bellows Falls); 05158 (Westminster)
- Area code: 802
- FIPS code: 50-52375
- GNIS feature ID: 2712439

North Westminster is a census-designated place (CDP) in Windham County, Vermont, United States. The population was 262 at the 2020 census. Formerly an incorporated village, it surrendered its charter on April 20, 2010 and reverted to the town of Westminster. The village area and additional surroundings were defined by the U.S. Census Bureau as a CDP in 2012.

== Geography ==
According to the United States Census Bureau, the village had a total area of 0.3 square mile (0.9 km^{2}), all land.

== Demographics ==
As of the census of 2000, there were 271 people, 106 households, and 75 families residing in the village. The population density was 816.1 people per square mile (317.1/km^{2}). There were 114 housing units at an average density of 343.3/sq mi (133.4/km^{2}). The racial makeup of the village was 95.20% White, 1.48% from other races, and 3.32% from two or more races. Hispanic or Latino of any race were 1.48% of the population.

There were 106 households, out of which 32.1% had children under the age of 18 living with them, 60.4% were married couples living together, 8.5% had a female householder with no husband present, and 29.2% were non-families. 19.8% of all households were made up of individuals, and 5.7% had someone living alone who was 65 years of age or older. The average household size was 2.56 and the average family size was 2.89.

In the village the population was spread out, with 24.4% under the age of 18, 5.5% from 18 to 24, 23.2% from 25 to 44, 30.6% from 45 to 64, and 16.2% who were 65 years of age or older. The median age was 42 years. For every 100 females, there were 122.1 males. For every 100 females age 18 and over, there were 107.1 males.

The median income for a household in the village was $48,750, and the median income for a family was $55,417. Males had a median income of $27,143 versus $21,875 for females. The per capita income for the village was $25,900. About 7.4% of families and 8.9% of the population were below the poverty line, including 17.7% of those under the age of eighteen and none of those 65 or over.
