= WEEY =

- Swanzey, New Hampshire; United States
- Broadcast area: Keene, New Hampshire
- Frequency: 93.5 MHz
- Branding: Country 93.5

Programming
- Format: Country music

Ownership
- Owner: Community Media LLC
- Sister stations: WFYX; WKKN; WTHK; WTSA; WTSA-FM

History
- First air date: January 1, 1972 (as WCFR-FM in Springfield, Vermont)
- Former call signs: WCFR-FM (1978–1987); WMKS (1987–1992); WCFR-FM (1992–2001); WXKK (2001–2004); WTSM (2004–2008)
- Call sign meaning: Similar to WEEI (previous format)

Technical information
- Licensing authority: FCC
- Facility ID: 4910
- Class: A
- ERP: 2,000 watts
- HAAT: 175 meters (574 ft)
- Transmitter coordinates: 42°54′57.3″N 72°19′50.3″W
- Repeater: 96.3 WFYX (Walpole)

Links
- Public license information: Public file; LMS
- Webcast: Listen live
- Website: www.country935.com

WEEY (93.5 FM) is a radio station licensed to serve Swanzey, New Hampshire. The station is owned by Community Media and broadcasts a country music format simulcast with WFYX (96.3 FM) in Walpole.

== History ==
The WEEY license was originally allocated to Springfield, Vermont, where it signed on as WCFR-FM, the FM sister station to WCFR (1480 AM), on January 1, 1972. It initially had an easy listening format, changing to an adult contemporary format in 1976. The station took the call letters WMKS in 1987, but in 1992 reverted to WCFR-FM. After the station was sold to Bob and Shirley Wolf in 1998, the station ceased its independent programming in favor of simulcasting sister station WMXR. As a simulcast of WMXR, formats included oldies, adult contemporary, and country.

Clear Channel Communications bought WCFR and WMXR in 2001, and merged the stations' country format (branded as "Bob Country") with that of its own WXXK, branded "Kixx". That October, the station would change its call letters to WXKK to reflect the station's new simulcast partner.

By September 2004, WXKK had reverted to an adult contemporary format in a simulcast with WGXL; in that month, the station converted to a simulcast of WTSL's news/talk programming as WTSM. Clear Channel sold its stations in the Lebanon, New Hampshire, market to Great Eastern Radio in January 2007, and two months later reverted WTSM to the WXXK simulcast. By the time of the consummation of the sale to Great Eastern Radio, WTSM had gone silent.

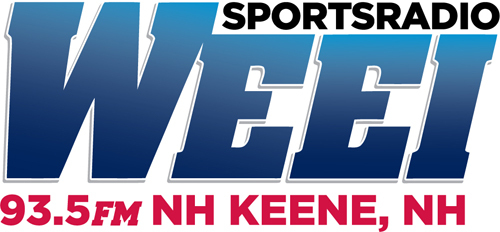
Logo used c. 2014

On June 8, 2007, WTSM was granted a construction permit to change its community of license to Swanzey, New Hampshire. This allowed the station to better serve the Keene market. As a result, when WTSM's attempt to return on January 25, 2008, was canceled by an interference complaint, the station permanently shut down the transmitting facility in Springfield, as the interference concerns would be alleviated by the relocation of the station. When WTSM completed its move on October 5, 2008 (though it was initially announced for September 15), the station resumed operations with sports talk provided by Boston's WEEI, under the call letters WEEY. In February 2012, WEEY replaced its nighttime simulcast of Fox Sports Radio with a simulcast of ESPN Radio, already carried in the market on WZBK; Fox Sports Radio returned to WEEY after less than one week. As of 2018, WEEY aired NBC Sports Radio when not airing WEEI-FM's programming. In later years, CBS Sports Radio and its successors aired in off hours.

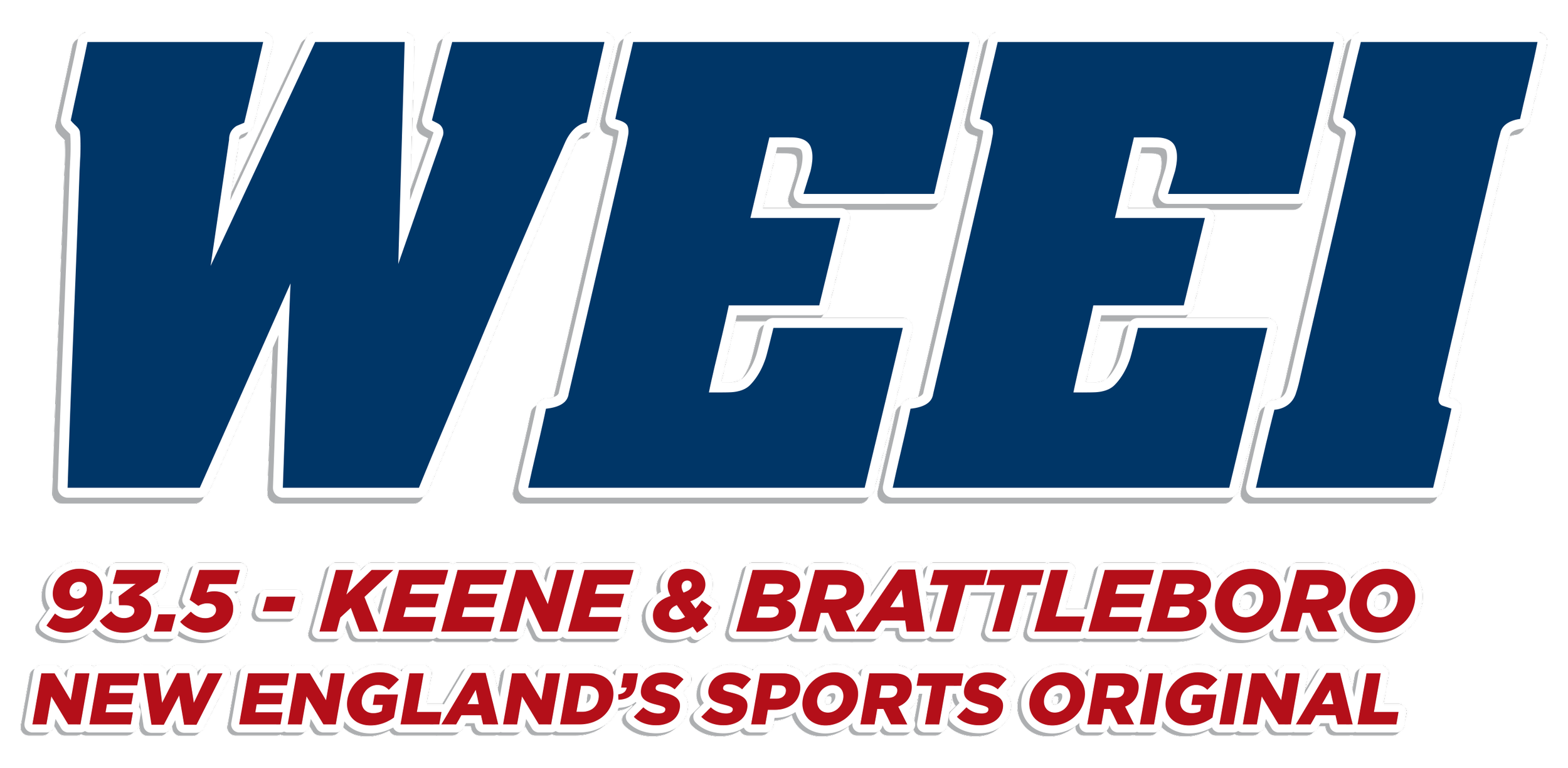
Logo used until June 2026

In April 2026, Jared Goodell's Community Media LLC, owner of WTSA and WTSA-FM in Brattleboro, Vermont, purchased Great Eastern Radio's Brattleboro–Keene cluster–WEEY; WKKN; WTHK; and WFYX–for $850,000. On June 29, 2026, the sale to Community Media closed and WTSA's country format moved to WEEY and WFYX as "Country 93.5". The sale left the Keene area without a sports station or affiliates for the Boston Red Sox, Celtics, or Bruins; the Red Sox would return to the market that August on WKVT-FM and WZBK.
