= WNDS =

WNDS may refer to:

- WNDS-LD, a defunct low-power television station (channel 44) formerly licensed to serve Ocala, Florida, United States
- WWJE-DT, a television station (channel 35, virtual 50) licensed to serve Derry, New Hampshire, United States, which held the call sign WNDS from 1983 to 2005
