= WZLF =

- Bellows Falls, Vermont; United States
- Broadcast area: Claremont, New Hampshire and Springfield, Vermont
- Frequency: 107.1 MHz
- Branding: 95.3 and 107.1 The Wolf

Programming
- Format: Country

Ownership
- Owner: Binnie Media; (WBIN Media Co., Inc.)
- Sister stations: WXLF

History
- First air date: 1981 (as WTIJ)
- Former call signs: WTIJ (1981–1983); WBFL (1983–1996); WZSH (1996–2005)
- Call sign meaning: "Wolf"

Technical information
- Licensing authority: FCC
- Facility ID: 69493
- Class: A
- ERP: 1,150 watts
- HAAT: 162 meters (531 ft)
- Transmitter coordinates: 43°12′33.2″N 72°19′56.3″W

Links
- Public license information: Public file; LMS
- Webcast: Listen live
- Website: 953thewolf.com

WZLF (107.1 FM, "95.3 and 107.1 The Wolf") is a radio station licensed to serve Bellows Falls, Vermont, transmitting from Alstead, New Hampshire. The station is owned by Binnie Media. It airs a country music format, simulcast with WXLF (95.3 FM) in Hartford.

The station has been assigned these call letters by the Federal Communications Commission since March 1, 2005.

== History ==
The station signed on in 1981 as WTIJ, a religious station owned by Brian Dodge. WTIJ was sold in 1983 to local residents Brad and Evelyn Weeks, who flipped it to country as WBFL. Dodge's mother Etta, owned WBFL's translator station in Keene, New Hampshire, W288AM (105.5 FM). On January 1, 1990, WBFL flipped again to classic rock as "B-107". That format, despite ratings success, was not profitable and ended two years later, and signaled the end of locally originated programming on 107.1. The station struggled into the mid 1990s with an adult album alternative format, then a simulcast of Marlboro station WSSH as WZSH until 1996 under new owner Dynacom. That was followed by country simulcasting under Dynacom and Vox, then Nassau Broadcasting Partners.

WZLF, along with 16 other Nassau stations in northern New England, was purchased at bankruptcy auction by WBIN Media Company, a company controlled by Bill Binnie, on May 22, 2012. Binnie already owned WBIN-TV in Derry, New Hampshire. The deal was completed on November 30, 2012.
