= Al Kaprielian =

American meteorologist

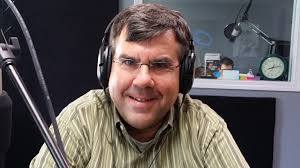
- Alma mater: Lyndon State College

Alan "Al" Kaprielian is a weather presenter in New Hampshire. He is best known for the 20+ years he has spent at Channel 50, a broadcast television station in Derry, New Hampshire. One journalist described him as a Kult of Kaprielian due to his distinctive voice and eccentric mannerisms, which included squeaky, high-pitched exclamations of "high pressure!" and "good evening!"; a distinct New England accent; sound effects reminiscent of Curly Howard; swinging his arms in circles rapidly and performing jumping jacks on camera. At one point during the Christmas season of 1999 the station even offered up Al Kaprielian tree ornaments.

== Biography ==
Kaprielian, born July 7, 1961, is a native of Natick, Massachusetts. He graduated from Lyndon State College, Lyndonville, Vermont in 1979. He currently resides in Merrimack, New Hampshire.

Kaprielian's run at the Channel 50 began in 1983 and survived several changes in station ownership. The run was interrupted on December 31, 2009 when, as part of many changes at the station, Kaprielian as well as most other on-air talent at the station was let go. Kaprielian found employment doing forecasts for Manchester Public Television Service (local access), the online site of the Nashua Telegraph newspaper, and radio station WCAP-AM (980) in Lowell, Massachusetts. After yet another change in ownership at the station, Kaprielian returned to Channel 50 in August 2012, doing hourly updates from 2pm to 9pm.

In 2002, Kaprielian starred in the short film Kowloon Castaway.

As of 2015, Kaprielian is no longer with WBIN-TV; he currently forecasts for WLMW radio in Manchester, New Hampshire.

== Notoriety ==
Kaprielian was awarded the "Best Weather Forecaster" in the Nashua Telegraph's 2004 Reader's Choice Awards. He has also been voted Best Media Personality and Best Weatherperson in New Hampshire Magazine's, The Very Best of New Hampshire Reader Choice Awards.

When not broadcasting weather information he tours local schools. During these visits, he teaches students about science and meteorology. He can also be found at local community events such as the Lowell Folk Festival, the Dracut Scholarship Foundation's Telethon, and the Derry News Cookie Eating Contest. He was also a feature celebrity judge at the 2009 Hampton Beach Seafood Festival, and attends the festival each year.
