= WMUD (FM) =

- Brandon, Vermont; United States
- Broadcast area: Rutland, Vermont
- Frequency: 101.5 MHz
- Branding: Mud Radio

Programming
- Format: Americana

Ownership
- Owner: Chip Morgan; (Mud Radio, LLC)

History
- First air date: 1999
- Former call signs: WADT (1993–1998); WEXP (1998–2024)
- Call sign meaning: "Mud"

Technical information
- Licensing authority: FCC
- Facility ID: 65961
- Class: A
- ERP: 350 watts directional
- HAAT: 398 meters (1,306 ft)
- Transmitter coordinates: 43.6587°N 73.1068°W

Links
- Public license information: Public file; LMS
- Webcast: Listen live
- Website: wmud.org

WMUD (101.5 MHz) is a commercial FM radio station licensed to Brandon, Vermont. WMUD broadcasts an Americana music format featuring recent Americana and country music, with programming focused on Rutland County, Vermont, and surrounding areas. Branded as "Mud Radio", the station features live, daily dialog with community service.

== History ==
The station's construction permit was originally owned by Tim Hoehn, Gary Savoie, and local resident Michael Carr who wound up selling a controlling interest to Jeff Shapiro. Although the transmitter is located a distance from Brandon, the tower site on Grandpa's Knob, in Castleton, Vermont, was the only place that would suffice to get a city grade signal over the majority of Brandon. A waiver from the Federal Communications Commission (FCC) permitted this operation. A story in the Rutland Herald depicted a large type balloon being raised over a hilltop in Pittsford to describe how high a proposed tower could be. Several hunters shot the balloon down, since the people there did not want a tower erected in their town.

WEXP went on the air in April 1999 under "Program Test Authority" from the FCC with no sales staff, no disc jockeys and only a Technics CD player airing the same repeating dance music CD with a legal ID imbedded, calling itself "Express 101". A contract engineer, Neil Langer, oversaw the operation and kept the station's public file at his residence. In October 2000, WEXP began to simulcast its signal over WVAY 100.7 (now WTHK) in Wilmington, Vermont, and its translator W284AB in Jamaica, Vermont.

On May 16, 2000, at noon, WEXP became "Classic Rock 101, The Fox". The very first song played was "Long Live Rock" by The Who. The station's initial lineup included the syndicated Imus In The Morning show. Alicia Ty hosted the midday slot. Baker (from the Mason and Sheehan Show in Albany, New York) was the first program director and afternoon host. John Roberts was hired a bit later, and handled the nighttime programming. A $1.01 Gas promotion at a Citgo gas station in Fair Haven, Vermont, that brought in hundreds of vehicles, over a three-hour time span was a catalyst in establishing the station as a player in the local marketplace.

The station's signal is directional to the southwest since it is short spaced to WNYQ (101.7 FM) in Glens Falls, New York, and slightly to the southeast to protect WRSY (101.5 FM) in Marlboro, Vermont. At one time, all three radio stations were owned by Vox Radio Group. The original allocation for the Brandon frequency was 101.9 FM, and was moved to its current 101.5 frequency when WCVR-FM in Randolph upgraded from a class A at 102.3 FM to a class C3 at 102.1. The original call sign for the station was WADT, which was assigned from 1993 to 1998, though the station never made it on the air under the WADT calls. The WEXP calls were previously used on WKOL in Plattsburgh, New York, until 1995, and on WLGQ in Gadsden, Alabama, from 1975 until 1984.

WEXP, along with 29 other Nassau stations in northern New England, was purchased at bankruptcy auction by Carlisle Capital Corporation, a company controlled by Bill Binnie (owner of WBIN-TV in Derry), on May 22, 2012. The station, and 12 of the other stations, would then be acquired by Vertical Capital Partners, controlled by Jeff Shapiro; however, as this would put Shapiro over the Federal Communications Commission's ownership limits in the Lebanon-Rutland-White River Junction market, WEXP and WWOD would be acquired by Electromagnetic Company, a company controlled by William and Gail Goddard. Simulcast station WTHK was not included in this deal and would remain with Shapiro. This transaction was consummated on November 30, 2012, with the WEXP/WWOD portion valued at a price of $600,000. On December 10, 2012, Scott Fybush reported that Radio Vermont paid $475,000 to buy the station. WEXP's simulcast on WTHK ended on January 22, 2013; that station began simulcasting WXXK. The sale to Radio Vermont was completed on March 15, 2013.

On June 12, 2014, Radio Vermont announced that WEXP would drop the classic rock format and launch an undisclosed music format branded as "101 The One" on July 1. The new format was simulcast with WCVT (101.7 FM) in Stowe, and featured what Ken Squier described as "a new adult service local to Vermont".

Station ownership changed in 2019 and relaunched the station as a non-profit with an eclectic music format, branded as "101.5 WEXP, Community Radio for Rutland County and the Killington Valley".

On July 8, 2021, WEXP went silent due to a faulty transmitter and antenna system. The license was transferred back to Woodchuck Radio after the deal fell through effective November 10, 2021, and the station remained off air.

On July 4, 2022, WEXP relaunched with an Americana format, which is a combination of current country and Americana songs, branded as "Mud Radio". The call sign was changed to WMUD on July 1, 2024.
