= WXPO-TV =

Television station in Manchester, New Hampshire (1969–1970)

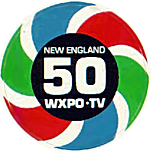
- Manchester, New Hampshire; Lowell, Massachusetts; United States
- City: Manchester, New Hampshire
- Channels: Analog: 50 (UHF)

Programming
- Affiliations: Independent (1969–1970)

Ownership
- Owner: Merrimack Valley Communications

History
- First air date: November 6, 1969
- Last air date: June 1970

Technical information
- ERP: 1135 kW
- HAAT: 615 ft (187 m)
- Transmitter coordinates: 42°49′1″N 71°16′12″W

WXPO-TV, UHF analog channel 50, was an independent television station licensed to Manchester, New Hampshire, and serving Lowell, Massachusetts. Owned by Merrimack Valley Communications, the station operated from November 1969 to June 1970.

== History ==
The station first signed on the air November 6, 1969, after several delays. WXPO operated from two studio facilities: its offices and master production facilities were located on Dutton Street in downtown Lowell, Massachusetts; however, its transmitter and "main" studio was located on Governor Dinsmore Road in Windham, New Hampshire, to comply with Federal Communications Commission (FCC) regulations requiring that a station's transmitter be located within 15 miles (24 km) of the city of license, Manchester. The original vision for the station was to air business news programming, known as "Info-50" during the daytime hours, and a general entertainment format – including sports – during the late afternoon and evening hours.

Its afternoon program, Treehouse 50, gained a cult following among Boston-area college students, as it featured slapstick comedy and the Warner Bros. Cartoons that had been released to television stations at that time. The station also attempted to do live remotes with some mixed success. In addition, WXPO was infamous for a New Year's Eve show that, according to some who watched, had started to become particularly strange by 1:00 a.m.

WXPO also attempted a news operation; in addition to the financial news programming, it was the first station to provide news updates every hour (a precursor to the 24 Hour News Source format used by many stations around the United States in the 1990s and ten years before CNN launched as the first all-news cable channel), and was the first New England television station to air a primetime newscast at 10 p.m. (WKBG-TV – channel 56, now WLVI – also attempted such a newscast during this time, but would not launch theirs for another two months). WXPO did not have any news film and relied solely on slides of photographs provided by the Associated Press for visuals.

The station's signal coverage in many parts of Greater Boston was spotty at best. The Lowell studio was located less than 1,000 feet (300 m) from the WLLH transmitter, making high-quality production impossible during the day due to RF interference with the cameras. Advertisers were scared off when the Lowell Sun blacklisted anyone who advertised on the station. Bills went unpaid for several months.

In January 1970, in the wake of the failure of negotiations to bring in new investors and ameliorate channel 50's financial difficulties, WXPO cut its broadcast day from 12 hours to 6 and dropped several local and syndicated shows. 90 percent of WXPO's staff was removed from the payroll, although many continued with the station, believing it could pull through. However, the spring of that year saw the closure of the Lowell studio, and bankruptcy proceedings claimed the station. It either went off the air in May, or in June when the power company pulled the plug at the Windham studios during a Maverick rerun, taking WXPO off the air.

Merrimack Valley Communications offered the WXPO-TV facility and permit for sale, including with ads in Broadcasting magazine; at the end of December 1971, it filed with the Federal Communications Commission to sell majority control to Vendelco, Inc. The FCC approved the transfer to Vendelco in August 1972. On July 17, 1973, channel 50 returned to the air with a test transmission, with plans to return the station to the air later that year, possibly as New Hampshire's CBS affiliate. Those plans were never realized, and the WXPO-TV construction permit was deleted by the FCC on November 25, 1974. The channel would remain silent until September 1983, when WNDS (now WWJE-DT) began operations.
