= WLMW =

- Manchester, New Hampshire; United States
- Frequency: 90.7 MHz
- Branding: New Hampshire Family Radio

Programming
- Format: Christian radio
- Affiliations: American Family Radio

Ownership
- Owner: Knowledge for Life

History
- First air date: August 29, 1997

Technical information
- Licensing authority: FCC
- Facility ID: 35251
- Class: A
- ERP: 15 watts
- HAAT: 265 meters (869 feet)
- Transmitter coordinates: 42°58′59.3″N 71°35′23.2″W

Links
- Public license information: Public file; LMS
- Webcast: Listen live

WLMW FM 90.7 is a Christian radio station licensed to Manchester, New Hampshire, and owned by Knowledge for Life. WLMW airs programming from American Family Radio as well as some local programs. Al Kaprielian is the station's on-air meteorologist.
