= WGXL =

- Hanover, New Hampshire; United States
- Broadcast area: Lebanon-Claremont, New Hampshire
- Frequency: 92.3 MHz (HD Radio)
- Branding: 92.3 GXL

Programming
- Format: Mainstream Top 40
- Subchannels: HD2: Simulcast of WTSV (Sports)

Ownership
- Owner: Great Eastern Radio, LLC
- Sister stations: WHDQ; WWOD; WTSV; WXXK

History
- First air date: February 6, 1987 (as WTSL-FM)
- Former call signs: WTSL-FM (1987–1993)

Technical information
- Licensing authority: FCC
- Facility ID: 56621
- Class: A
- ERP: 6,000 watts
- HAAT: 99 meters (325 ft)
- Transmitter coordinates: 43°39′17.2″N 72°17′39.3″W

Links
- Public license information: Public file; LMS
- Webcast: Listen live
- Website: www.wgxl.com

WGXL (92.3 FM) is a radio station licensed to Hanover, New Hampshire, serving the Lebanon-Claremont area. The station is owned by Great Eastern Radio, LLC. It airs a Mainstream Top 40 format. WGXL-HD2 carries a simulcast of the sports programming on sister station WTSV (94WEEI)

== History ==
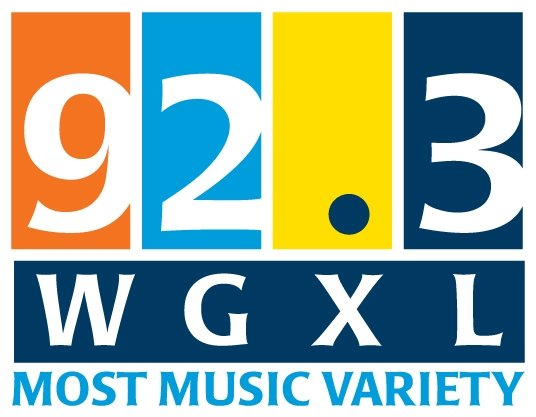
Former logo of the station

The station went on the air as WTSL-FM, the FM sister station to WTSL (1400 AM), on February 6, 1987. On June 1, 1993, the station changed its call sign to the current WGXL.

== On-air staff ==
The current on-air hosts are Elise Valentine (morning), Stevens (late morning to early afternoon), John Tesh (syndicated in the afternoon & drivetime), Liveline with Mason (Evenings Mon-Sat) and AT40 with Ryan Seacrest (Saturday mornings).

== Former on-air staff ==
Former members of WGXL's staff include Stevens Blanchard, Pam Bixby, Dave Cooper, Deidre Tichner, Jim Patry, Rick Murphy, Jason Place, Bev Valentine, Dan Gilland, Shane Blue (now Jackson Blue on Boston's WXKS-FM), Chris Garrett, Doug McKenzie, Steve Smith, Parker Springfield (still on sister station WKKN) and Taylor Ford. "Zach Sang And The Gang," a syndicated evening show, was also once heard on WGXL.
