= WKKN =

- Westminster, Vermont; United States
- Broadcast area: Keene, New Hampshire
- Frequency: 101.9 MHz
- Branding: Jolly 101.9

Programming
- Format: Stunting (Christmas music)
- Affiliations: Compass Media Networks

Ownership
- Owner: Jared Goodell; (Community Media, LLC)
- Sister stations: WEEY; WFYX; WTHK; WTSA; WTSA-FM

History
- First air date: 1971 (as WCNL-FM at 101.7)
- Former call signs: WCNL-FM (1971–1988); WXXK-FM (1988–1997); WVRR (1997–2008)
- Former frequencies: 101.7 MHz (1971–2008)
- Call sign meaning: Keene

Technical information
- Licensing authority: FCC
- Facility ID: 46334
- Class: A
- ERP: 1,050 watts
- HAAT: 236 meters (774 ft)
- Transmitter coordinates: 43°2′0.3″N 72°22′2″W

Links
- Public license information: Public file; LMS
- Webcast: Listen live
- Website: www.jolly1019.com

WKKN (101.9 FM; "Jolly 101.9") is a radio station licensed to Westminster, Vermont, United States, with studios located in Keene, New Hampshire. The station is owned by Community Media.

== History ==
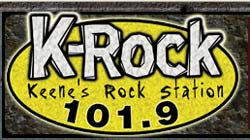
Logo as "K-Rock"

The station went on the air as WCNL-FM in 1971, on 104.9 MHz and was originally licensed to Newport, New Hampshire, and was on 101.7 FM with transmitting facilities atop Green Mountain in Claremont. On August 1, 1988, the station changed its call sign to WXXK-FM, and was the original home of the successful country station "Kixx" before moving to the more powerful 100.5 frequency in Lebanon, New Hampshire. On March 31, 1997, the call sign changed to WVRR and operated under the moniker V-101. In 2002, Clear Channel merged V-101 with WMXR to become locally produced Rock 93.9 & 101.7. The station was granted a move by the FCC to change the city of license to Westminster, Vermont, and move to its present frequency of 101.9 FM. After the move was completed, on April 14, 2008, the call sign was changed to WKKN; the station then introduced a Keene-focused rock format branded "K-Rock".

On October 1, 2012, WKKN changed its format to country, simulcasting WXXK; this change came after the bankruptcy of Nassau Broadcasting led to the sale of WHDQ (a classic rock station in Claremont that has long considered Keene to be part of its broadcast area) to Great Eastern Radio. The WXXK simulcast ended on March 16, 2015, when WKKN, along with WTHK in Wilmington (which had also been serving as a WXXK simulcast), launched an adult album alternative format branded as "The Peak". The station switched to a classic rock format on May 14, 2018, retaining the "Peak" branding.

In April 2026, Jared Goodell's Community Media LLC, owner of WTSA and WTSA-FM in Brattleboro, Vermont, purchased Great Eastern Radio's Brattleboro–Keene cluster–WKKN; WTHK; WEEY; and WFYX–for $850,000. On June 30, 2026, the sale to Community Media closed and WKKN flipped from "The Peak" to adult contemporary as "Magic 102", utilizing the branding and staff of WTSA-FM.

On November 1, 2026, WKKN dropped its semi-simulcast with WTSA-FM and "Magic 102" branding and began stunting with Christmas music, branded as "Jolly 101.9".
