= Jerome Allen (author) =

Jerome Allen (1830–1894) was an American educator and author, born in Westminster, Vermont.

He graduated from Amherst College in 1851, then presided over several institutions in the Western United States from 1851 to 1885.

== Books ==
- Handbook of Experimental Chemistry (1876)
- Short Studies in English (1886–7)
- Mind Studies for Young Teachers (seventh edition, 1887)
- Temperament of Education (1890)
