= Steve Katsos =

American television personality

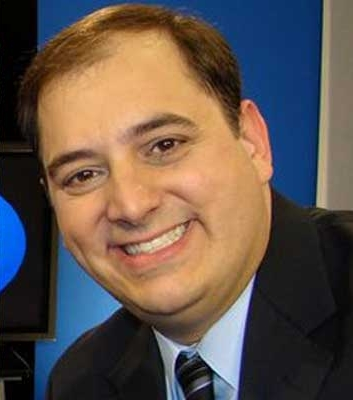
- Steve Katsos
- Occupation: Talk show host
- Years active: 2008–present

Steve Katsos is an American TV personality and host of The Steve Katsos Show, a television show based out of Arlington, Massachusetts. The show has earned national recognition, including winning the Hometown Video Award from the Alliance for Community Media.

The show was started as volunteers helping struggling artists and as of 2011, airs in over 13 million homes weekly in the US and Europe, aired on several stations worldwide such as WBIN-TV, in the U.K. and Ireland on My Channel, My TV, ACMi.

Guests of the Steve Katsos Show have ranged from local musicians such as Will Dailey & The Rivals, The Luxury and The Self-Proclaimed Rockstars, to artists and comedians such as Lenny Clarke, Jimmy Tingle, and Mike Koutrobis. Other established celebrities and personalities have made appearances such as Candy O'Terry, Joe Wong, Rick Dumont, Dave Zeltserman, Governor Michael Dukakis and sitting governor Deval Patrick, among many others.

Katsos regularly puts on benefit shows for charitable causes such as The Jimmy Fund and Autism Speaks.
