= Kurn Hattin Homes for Children =

Kurn Hattin Home and School for Children
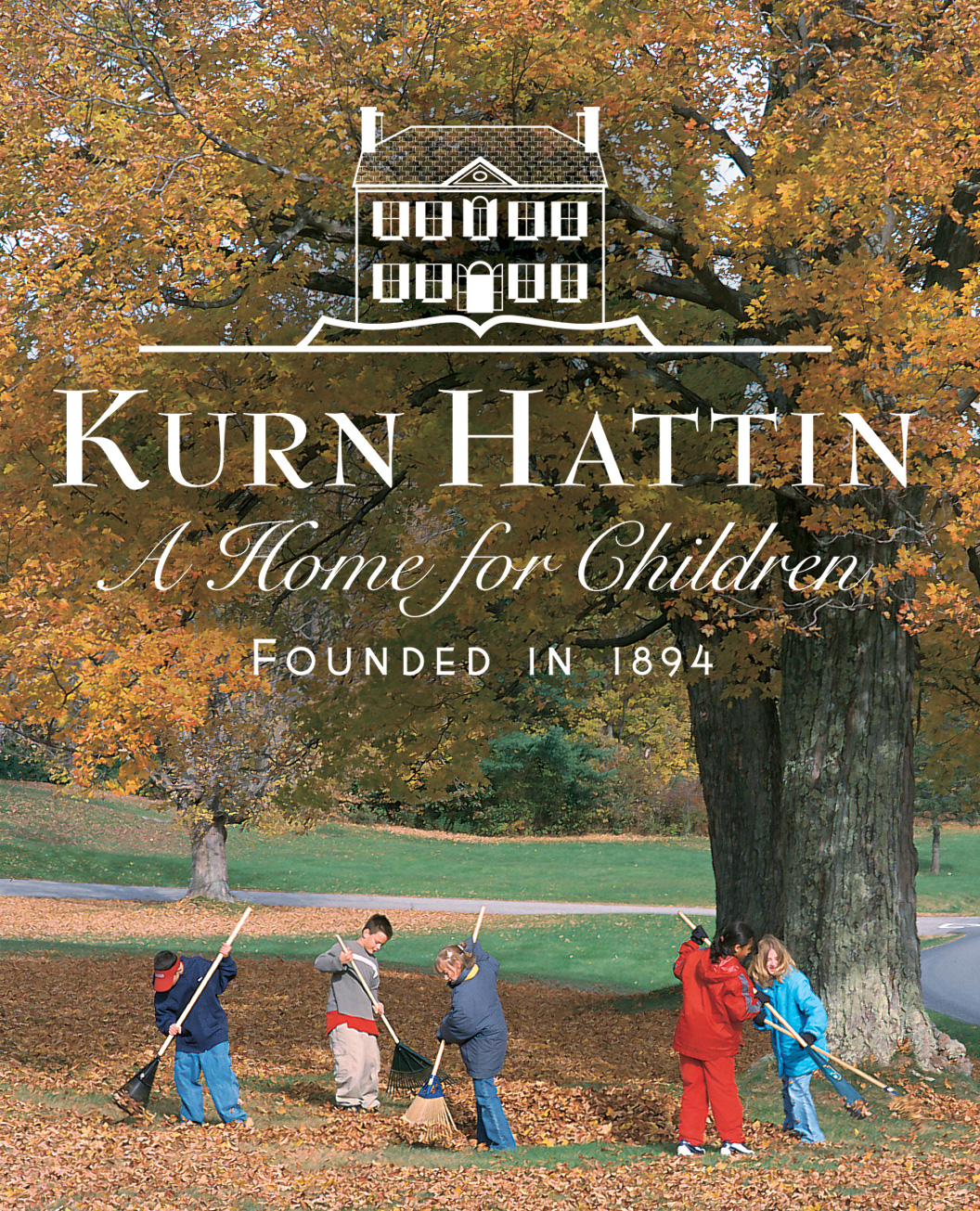
- Kids raking leaves with logo superimposed
- 708 Kurn Hattin Road, Westminster, VT; U.S.

Information
- Type: Non-profit charitable residential school for children whose families are facing difficult circumstances.
- Motto: Kurn Hattin transforms the lives of children and their families forever.
- Established: 1894
- Executive Director: Susan Kessler, M.Ed.
- Enrollment: 35
- Campus: 300 Acres
- Website: https://www.kurnhattin.org/

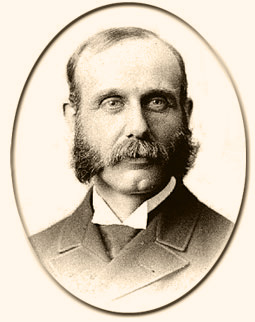
Portrait of Charles A. Dickinson

Kurn Hattin Home and School for Children is a non-profit located in Westminster, Vermont, which serves as a donor-supported home and school for boys and girls, ages 6–15, who are affected by tragedy, social or economic hardship, or other disruption in family life. It was founded in 1894 by Reverend Charles Albert Dickinson, and was originally called New England Kurn Hattin Homes. It is the oldest childcare organization in the northeast United States to be continuously supported completely by charity.

== Founder ==
Charles Dickinson was a congregational minister who served at Boston's Berkeley Street Temple from 1887 - 1900. Dickinson was instrumental in expanding the accessibility of the congregational church by creating a ministry of smaller neighborhood churches, rather than the larger churches that catered only to the wealthy. A pioneer in new methods of residential child care and social services, Dickinson founded Kurn Hattin Home and School for Children based on a long-term view of societal reform through proper education and social preparation of youth.

== Name ==
The name "Kurn Hattin" stems from the Hebrew name for the "Horns of Hattin", the mountain range in Palestine where Christ is said to have recited the Beatitudes. In 1893, Kurn Hattin's founder, Charles Albert Dickinson, visited the site in his hometown of Westminster, Vermont, which he had secured for the purpose of establishing a safe haven for homeless boys. Looking out over the landscape, he noted its resemblance to the biblical location.

== Coverage ==
Kurn Hattin Home and School for Children garnered national attention when the school was featured on CBS Evening News January 20, 2014, following the announcement that its music teacher, Lisa Bianconi, was a finalist for the inaugural Grammy Music Educator Award.

In 2013, Kurn Hattin's music program director, Lisa Bianconi, was nominated for the inaugural Grammy Music Educator Award. She was selected from 30,000 nominees around the country and became one of only 10 finalists for the award—the only finalist to be chosen from New England.

In 1907, W. J. Van Patten wrote An Appeal for Kurn Hattin, an article detailing Kurn Hattin's charitable activities and an appeal to prospective donors for funds for expansion and improvements at the Homes.

In 1931, the Vermont People's National Bank of Brattleboro published With Interest – The Mount of Beatitudes, a book featuring a detailed explanation of Kurn Hattin Home and School for Children and its mission and including numerous photos from the period.

John L. Hurd, a graduate of Kurn Hattin’s Class of 1919, wrote a memoir entitled, Kurn Hattin, The Story of Home, which was published in 1989. The book chronicles Kurn Hattin Home and School for Children between the years between 1913 and 1985. A second edition of the book is slated for 2014.

The National Society of New England Women, an organization with philanthropic ties to Kurn Hattin, regularly publishes a retrospective of its activities including numerous references to Kurn Hattin in Papers, 1895-2002.

== Abuse allegations ==
Former residents at the Kurn Hattin Home and School for Children (formerly known as Kurn Hattin Home for Boys and The Warner Home for Girls) alleged that sexual misconduct was perpetrated by both staff and peers at the school.

In July 2020 Kurn Hattin's former Executive Director, Stephen Harrison directed the Kurn Hattin Board of Directors to conduct an investigation into the allegations of child sexual, physical, and emotional abuse. To that end, Kurn Hattin retained the services of two law firms to conduct the investigation: McNeil Leddy & Sheahan, and CSC Investigations, both of Burlington, Vermont. The independent investigation was concluded in 2022, and attorneys for both the claimants and Kurn Hattin determined to keep the report confidential.

While physical and sexual abuse was alleged in the media to have occurred between the late 1940's until 2019, many of the claims were determined by Vermont’s Department for Children and Families to be unsubstantiated. Claims from former residents were largely settled in 2023.

A former Kurn Hattin houseparent, Mark W. Davis was indicted in January 2021 for possessing images of child sexual abuse allegedly from Kurn Hattin Home and School for Children three decades after being convicted of molesting at least 17 boys at Kurn Hattin. While a detective from the N.H. Internet Crimes Against Children Task Force and Cheshire County Sheriff's Office stated that Kurn Hattin had not been "helpful" in identifying the photographed children in sanitized images, records and emails from Kurn Hattin show that all requested information was submitted to the detective promptly.

== Current Situation ==
Kurn Hattin Home and School for Children was scrutinized by the Vermont State Senate committees, resulting in a five-month-long AOE investigation resulting in the following conclusion from Daniel French, VT Secretary of Education in a letter dated May 14, 2021:

“In the course of its thorough investigation, the Review Team found that Kurn Hattin has taken action to revise its policies and procedures, reduce residential student to staff ratios, add additional oversight of day-to-day operation through the Assistant Executive Director’s position, and increase involvement of the Board of Trustees through your active leadership as Board Chair. I accept the Review Team’s conclusion that through consistent implementation and ongoing oversight, KH can remain compliant with the standards required of approved independent school and provide a safe and healthy environment for its students.”

Additionally, Kurn Hattin conducted a 5-year-long accreditation process with the New England Association of Schools and Colleges beginning in 2018. An extensive (180 pages) Self-Study (taking almost 2 years of staff involvement) and 3 separate on-site visits by teams of 2 to 6 independent school professionals as evaluators, who spoke to every staff person as well as most of the children, resulted in the following conclusion from the head of the independent schools’ accreditation process, Beth Hamilton, Associate Director of Accreditation and School Improvement in the final accreditation letter in February 2023:

“As a member of three different teams visiting KHH over the past five years, it has been a privilege for me to meet with the dedicated members of the adult community and tour both the educational and residential facilities. There is no doubt in my mind that KHH is nurturing the young children in its care with a commitment to the original mission of its founding. I commend the school for the transparency of the adult community and its willingness to accept suggestions for growth and improvement. KHH has embraced accreditation as a process that demonstrates the highest levels of quality assurance and, no less importantly, leverages school improvement.”

== Notable graduates ==
- Dick Nash, Trombonist
- Krystal Hope, Model
