= WNHV =

Radio station in White River Junction, Vermont (1959–2010)

White River Junction, Vermont; United States
- Broadcast area: Lebanon-Hanover-White River Junction area
- Frequency: 910 kHz
- Branding: The Score

Programming
- Format: Sports

Ownership
- Owner: Nassau Broadcasting

History
- First air date: 1959
- Last air date: May 5, 2010
- Former call signs: WWRJ (1959–1963); WVTR (1963–1966)
- Call sign meaning: New Hampshire & Vermont

Technical information
- Facility ID: 17800
- Class: D
- Power: 1,000 watts day 84 watts night
- Transmitter coordinates: 43°37′19.00″N 72°21′4.00″W

WNHV (910 AM) was a radio station licensed to White River Junction, Vermont, United States. The station served the Lebanon-Rutland-White River area. The station was owned by Nassau Broadcasting III, LLC.

== History ==
The station began operations in 1959 as WWRJ, playing music. In 1963 the call letters were changed to WVTR. Two years later the station became WNHV, branded as "The Voice of The Valley", when purchased by television announcer and Reynolds Aluminum spokesman Rex Marshall (NH-VT Broadcasting Corp). The studios shifted to downtown White River Junction for several years prior to becoming WNHV. Marshall moved the station back to its original Route 5 transmitter location, enlarging the old studio building to house his future FM facility. WNHV-FM was added in 1969, and the stations simulcast until local sunset, when the AM station, authorized to operate daytime-only, had to sign-off. Upon the death of Marshall in 1983, both stations were sold and had several owners by the time the AM station went off the air in 2010. The FM station became WKXE in March 1985; it is now WXLF. In 2000, the AM station adopted a sports radio format, affiliated with ESPN Radio, and branded as The Score 910. It ceased operations on May 5, 2010, due to transmitter problems. It also lost its tower site, which had been farm land. The former site now houses a National Guard facility. On September 12, 2011, the station's license was deleted by the Federal Communications Commission.
