= Westminster (town), Vermont =

Westminster, Vermont
- Town
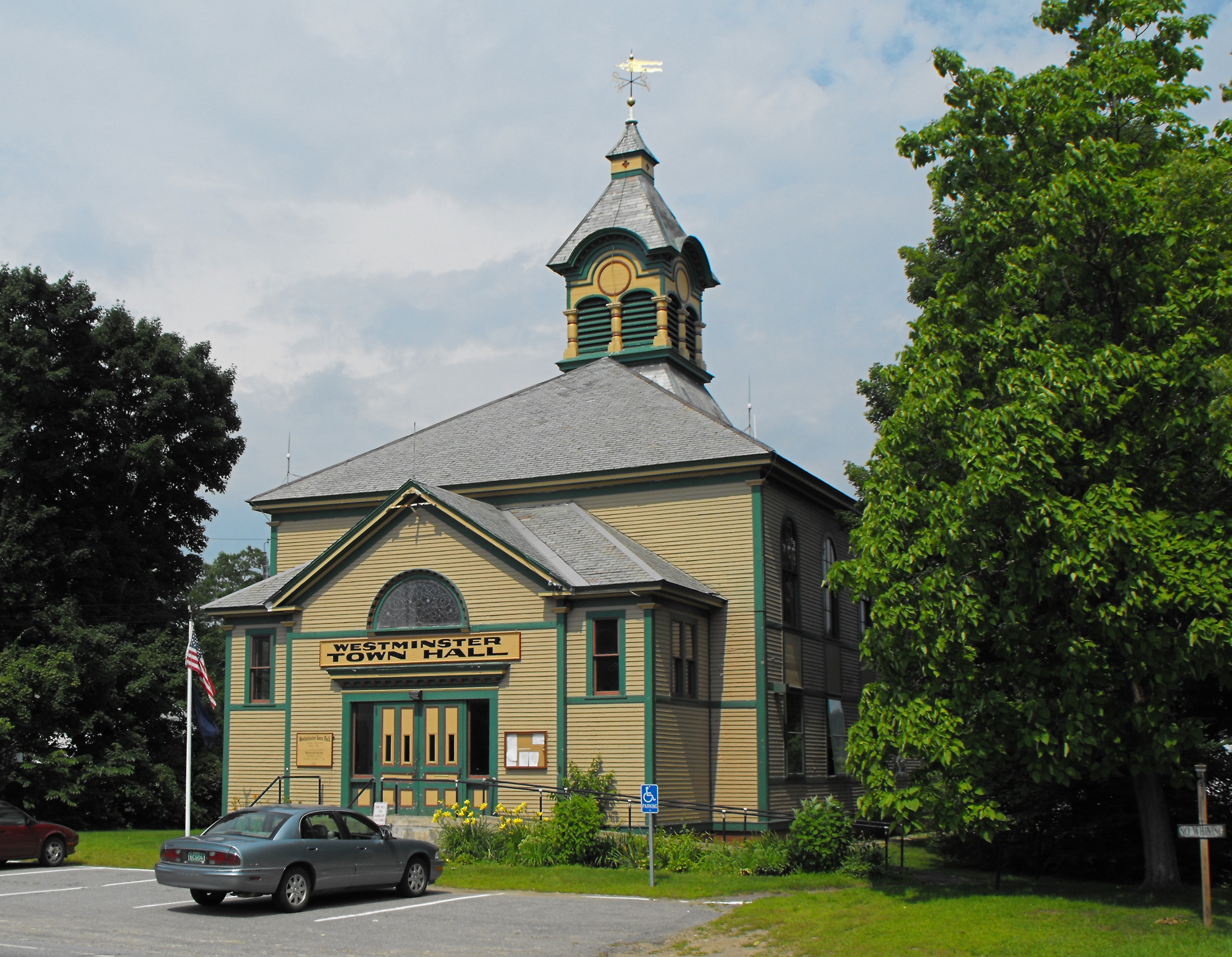
- Westminster Town Hall

- Seal

- Location in the United States Westminster (the United States)
- Coordinates: 43°05′50″N 72°30′37″W
- Country: United States
- State: Vermont
- County: Windham
- Settled: 1751
- Chartered: November 9, 1752
- Communities: Westminster; North Westminster; Westminster Station; Westminster West
- Elevation: 879 ft (268 m)

Population (2020)
  - Total: 3,016
  - Density: 66/sq mi (25.3/km^{2})
- Time zone: UTC-5 (Eastern (EST))
  - Summer (DST): UTC-4 (EDT)
- ZIP Codes: 05158 (Westminster); 05159 (Westminster Station); 05346 (Westminster West); 05101 (Bellows Falls)
- Area code: 802
- GNIS feature ID: 1462253

Westminster is a town in Windham County, Vermont, United States. The population was 3,016 at the 2020 census. It was also the first capital of the Republic of Vermont. It borders the state of New Hampshire.

== History ==
Westminster is Vermont's oldest existing town and was chartered in 1735 by the Province of Massachusetts Bay and was called New Taunton or Township Number One. The town did not have any permanent settlers in the area until 1751. New Hampshire settlers came in and the town was later incorporated in the Province of New Hampshire on November 9, 1752, becoming the third chartered town for New Hampshire west of the Connecticut River. When the British government recognized the Province of New York's claims to what is now Vermont, New York moved its Court of Common Pleas for Cumberland County to Westminster in 1772. It was the site of the Westminster Massacre in March 1775, in which two men were killed attempting to prevent New York provincial officials from exerting their authority over the area in the long-running dispute over the New Hampshire Grants. On January 15, 1777, a group of Vermonters met in the Westminster courthouse to declare the independence of the Republic of New Connecticut (later renamed the Vermont Republic).

== Geography ==
According to the United States Census Bureau, the town has a total area of 46.1 square miles (119 km^{2}), of which 46.1 square miles (119 km^{2}) is land and 0.04 square miles (0.10 km^{2}) (0.06%) is water.

== Transportation ==
Westminster is crossed by Interstate 91 (Exit 5 serves the town), U.S. Route 5, Vermont Route 121 and Vermont Route 123.

The New England Central Railroad has track rights through the town. Amtrak's Vermonter passenger rail line runs through Westminster but does not stop in town. The closest stations are Bellows Falls to the north and Brattleboro to the south.

== Demographics ==
Historical population
Census	Pop.	Note	%±
1790	1,601		—
1800	1,942		21.3%
1810	1,925		−0.9%
1820	1,974		2.5%
1830	1,737		−12.0%
1840	1,546		−11.0%
1850	1,721		11.3%
1860	1,300		−24.5%
1870	1,238		−4.8%
1880	1,377		11.2%
1890	1,265		−8.1%
1900	1,295		2.4%
1910	1,327		2.5%
1920	1,289		−2.9%
1930	1,324		2.7%
1940	1,403		6.0%
1950	1,400		−0.2%
1960	1,602		14.4%
1970	1,875		17.0%
1980	2,493		33.0%
1990	3,026		21.4%
2000	3,210		6.1%
2010	3,178		−1.0%
2020	3,016		−5.1%
U.S. Decennial Census

As of the census of 2000, there were 3,210 people, 1,246 households, and 843 families residing in the town. The population density was 69.7 people per square mile (26.9 people/km^{2}). There were 1,412 housing units at an average density of 30.6 units per square mile (11.8 units/km^{2}). The racial makeup of the town was 97.73% White, 0.40% Black or African American, 0.28% Native American, 0.22% Asian, 0.34% from other races, and 1.03% from two or more races. Hispanic or Latino of any race were 0.69% of the population.

There were 1,246 households, out of which 34.6% had children under the age of 18 living with them, 55.5% were married couples living together, 8.8% had a female householder with no husband present, and 32.3% were non-families. 24.4% of all households were made up of individuals, and 6.7% had someone living alone who was 65 years of age or older. The average household size was 2.58 and the average family size was 3.06.

In the town, the population was spread out, with 27.3% under the age of 18, 5.5% from 18 to 24, 29.8% from 25 to 44, 27.1% from 45 to 64, and 10.3% who were 65 years of age or older. The median age was 38 years. For every 100 females, there were 95.0 males. For every 100 females age 18 and over, there were 93.1 males.

The median income for a household in the town was $44,263, and the median income for a family was $49,615. Males had a median income of $32,365 versus $26,303 for females. The per capita income for the town was $20,019. About 7.1% of families and 10.0% of the population were below the poverty line, including 10.8% of those under age 18 and 8.1% of those age 65 or over.

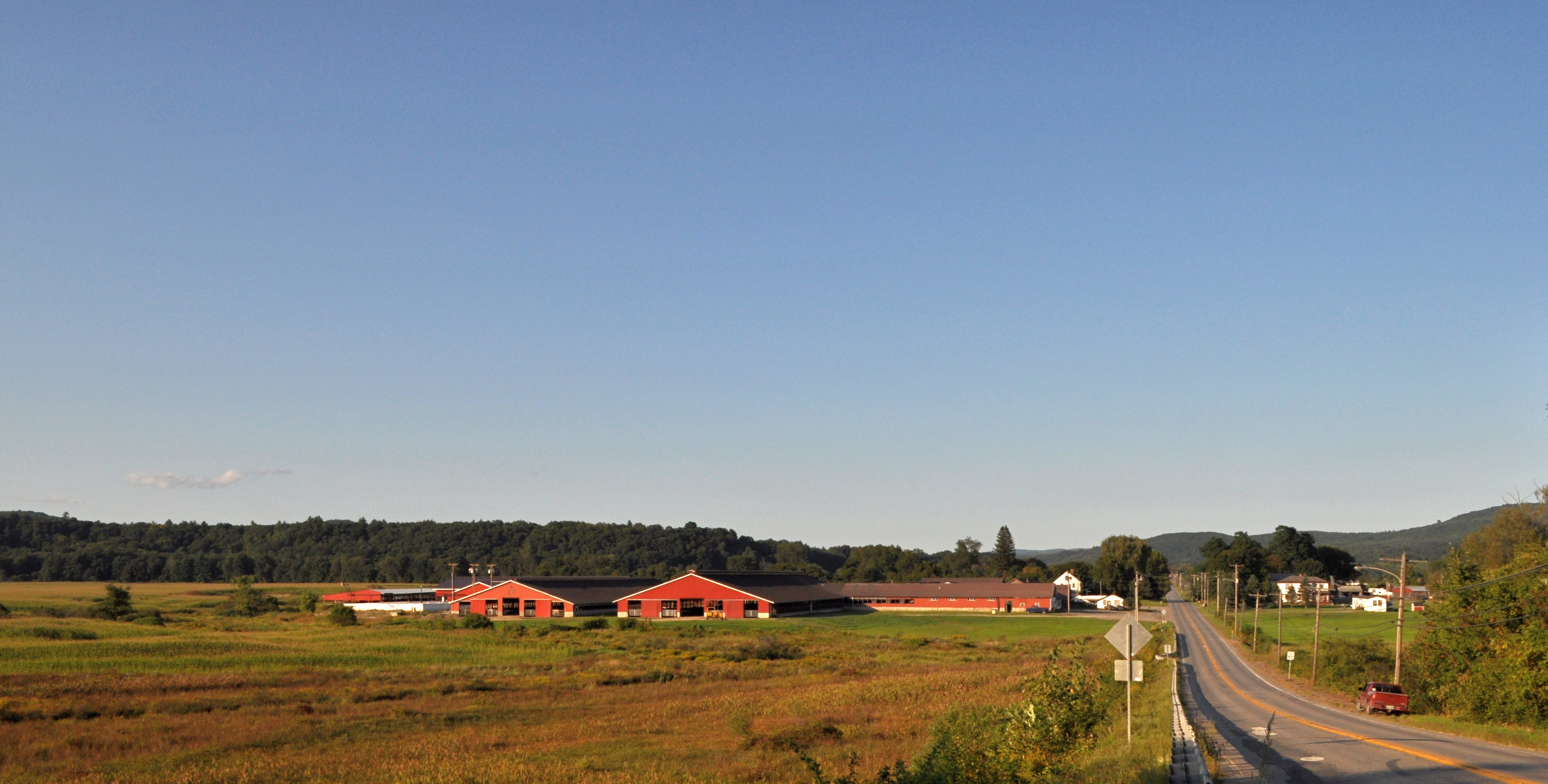
Westminster is mostly rural in nature

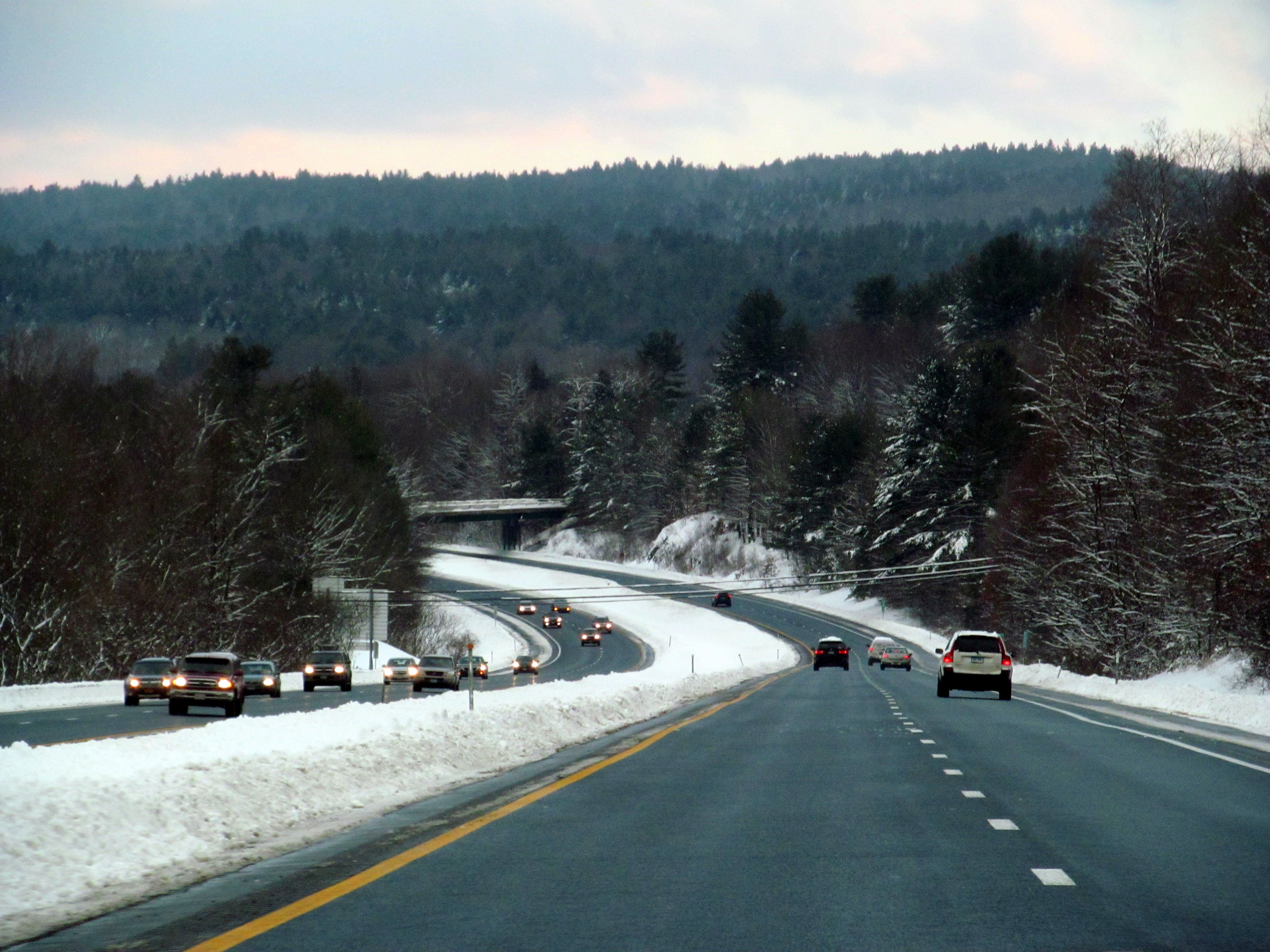
I-91 in Westminster

== Media ==
Westminster is the city of license for adult contemporary radio station WKKN ("Magic 102", semi-satellite of WTSA-FM), although the station is based in and serves the Keene radio market along with other Community Media, LLC stations.

== Notable people ==
- Fanny Allen, daughter of Ethan Allen, who converted to Catholicism and became a nun
- Jerome Allen, educator and author
- Stephen R. Bradley, US Senator from Vermont
- William Czar Bradley. US Representative from Vermont
- Edmund Burke, US Representative from New Hampshire
- Joseph Dorr Clapp, Wisconsin State Senator and businessman, was born in Westminster
- Lot Hall, Justice of the Vermont Supreme Court
- Hiram Pratt, mayor of Buffalo, New York
- Mark Richards, US Congressman and seventh Lieutenant Governor of Vermont

== See also ==
- Westminster (village), Vermont
- Kurn Hattin Homes for Children
- List of capitals in the United States#Vermont Republic
