= WWOD =

- Woodstock, Vermont; United States
- Broadcast area: Lebanon-Rutland-White River Junction
- Frequency: 93.9 MHz
- Branding: 93.9 The River

Programming
- Format: Adult album alternative

Ownership
- Owner: Great Eastern Radio, LLC
- Sister stations: WGXL; WHDQ; WTSV; WXXK

History
- First air date: April 18, 1989 (as WMXR)
- Former call signs: WMXR (1988–2012)
- Call sign meaning: "Oldies" (former branding of 104.3 FM)

Technical information
- Licensing authority: FCC
- Facility ID: 57002
- Class: A
- ERP: 3,100 watts horiz; 2,980 watts vert
- HAAT: 139 meters (456 ft)
- Transmitter coordinates: 43°38′49.2″N 72°21′47.3″W

Links
- Public license information: Public file; LMS
- Webcast: Listen live
- Website: www.river939.com

WWOD (93.9 FM) is an adult album alternative broadcasting radio station. Licensed to Woodstock, Vermont, United States, the station serves the Lebanon-Rutland-White River Junction area. Established in 1989 as WMXR, the station is owned by Great Eastern Radio, LLC.

== History ==
The station went on the air April 18, 1989, as WMXR by Rob and Shirley Wolf. In its early years, the station broadcast an oldies format branded "Magic 94", which was expanded to WCFR-FM 93.5 (now WEEY) in 1998 after the Wolfs' acquisition of that station. WMXR also operated a translator in White River Junction, W232AP (94.3 FM); the three frequencies were billed as the Valley's "Superstation". The station subsequently evolved into one of the country's first classic hits station (programmed by KFRC's Chuck "Boom Boom" Canon) with all-digital studios and first-in-the nation internet streaming in 1995 via Dartmouth College. In April 2000, new owners Conn River Broadcasting switched the stations' format to country music as "Bob Country"; though it used the branding and "Turn your knob to Bob" slogan formerly used by WBOB-FM in Minneapolis–Saint Paul, the name was believed to be a reference to Bob Frisch, then-owner of competing country station WXXK (100.5 FM).

Clear Channel Communications bought WMXR and WCFR in 2001 and merged "Bob Country" with its existing country station in the market, WXXK, branded "Kixx". After several months of simulcasting with WXXK, WMXR switched to a simulcast of WVRR's (101.7 FM, now WKKN at 101.9) classic rock format that October. WMXR shifted to modern rock in late March 2002, though WVRR did not follow suit until early April. Two years later, the stations (branded Rock 93.9 & 101.7) tweaked their format to mainstream rock with modest success.

Clear Channel sold its stations in the Lebanon, New Hampshire, market to Great Eastern Radio in January 2007, who later that year switched WMXR to a news/talk format as "93.9 The Pulse", modeled on sister station WTPL in Hillsborough, New Hampshire. This format was moved to and consolidated with a similar format on sister station WTSL (1400 AM) under the "Pulse" branding in May 2008, at which point WMXR adopted a classic hits format as "Maxx 93.9". The station subsequently returned to classic rock, retaining the "Maxx" branding.

WMXR returned to a classic hits format on November 19, 2012, branded as "Kool 93.9 & 96.3"; the branding came in advance of adding a simulcast with WFYX (96.3 FM) in Walpole, New Hampshire, which Great Eastern Radio was in the process of acquiring from Nassau Broadcasting Partners. On November 30, WMXR changed its call letters to WWOD, swapping calls with then-silent 104.3 FM, which has since been moved to the Burlington, Vermont, radio market.

On July 7, 2016, Dartmouth College announced that WWOD and WFYX would be the new carriers of Big Green men's and women's basketball broadcasts as part of the Big Green Sports Network / Learfield Sports.

On November 1, 2017, WWOD changed its format to adult album alternative, branded as "93.9 The River". "The River" had previously broadcast on W294AB (106.7 FM) and the second HD Radio subchannel of WHDQ (106.1 FM), where the format launched on March 14, 2014; the "Kool FM" programming, which by then had shifted to an oldies format provided by Scott Shannon's True Oldies Channel, concurrently moved to WHDQ-HD2 and W294AB and continued to be simulcast on WFYX.
