= Westminster (village), Vermont =

Westminster, Vermont
- Village
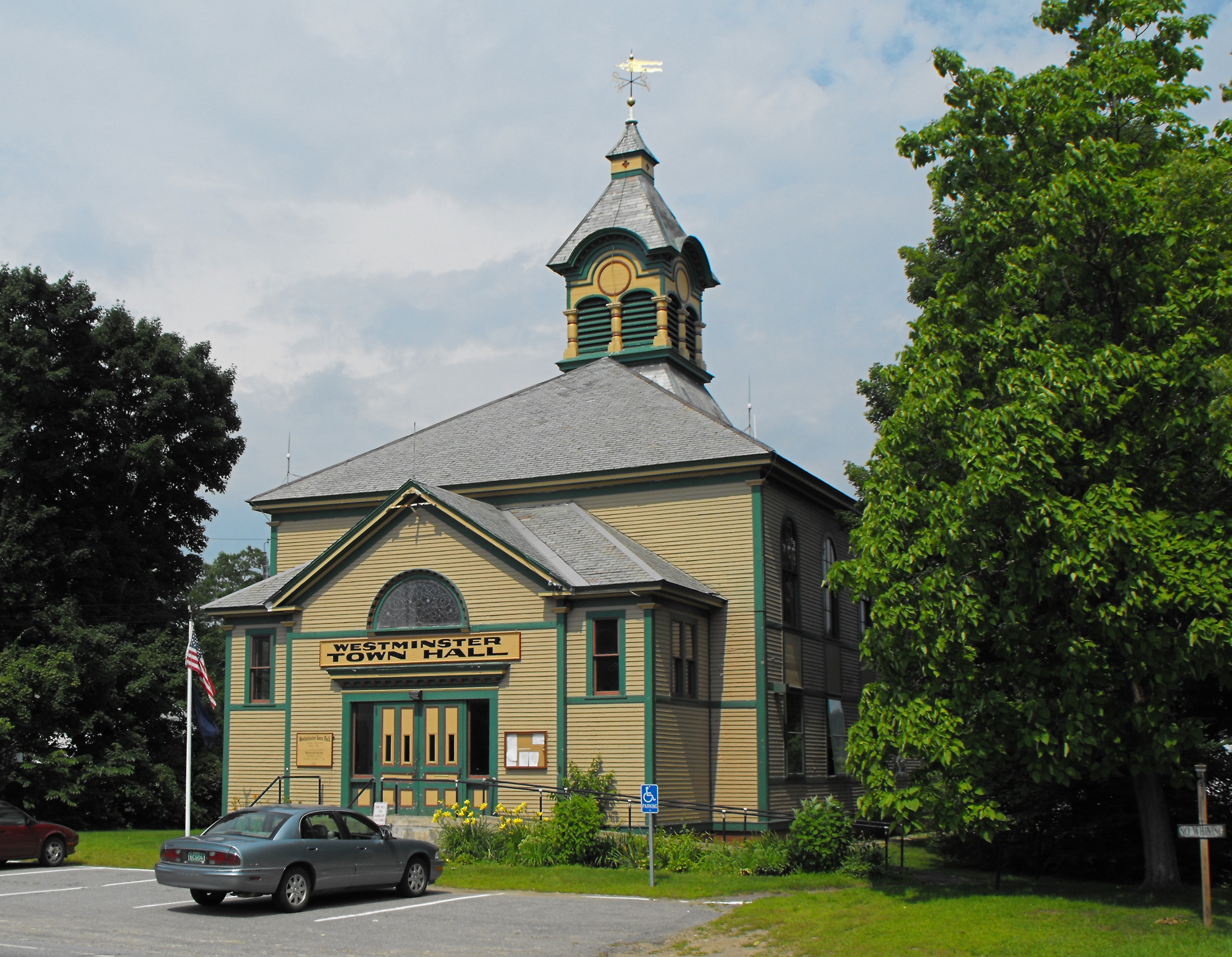
- Westminster Town Hall

- Location in the United States Westminster (the United States)
- Coordinates: 43°04′26″N 72°27′18″W
- Country: United States
- State: Vermont
- County: Windham
- Town: Westminster

Area
  - Total: 1.37 sq mi (3.55 km^{2})
  - Land: 1.36 sq mi (3.53 km^{2})
  - Water: 0.0039 sq mi (0.01 km^{2})
- Elevation: 236 ft (72 m)

Population (2020)
  - Total: 287
  - Density: 211/sq mi (81.3/km^{2})
- Time zone: UTC-5 (Eastern (EST))
  - Summer (DST): UTC-4 (EDT)
- ZIP code: 05158
- Area code: 802
- FIPS code: 50-81325
- GNIS feature ID: 2378332
- Westminster Village Historic District
- U.S. National Register of Historic Places
- U.S. Historic district
- Location: Main and School Sts., and Grout Ave., Westminster, Vermont
- Area: 150 acres (61 ha)
- Architect: Multiple
- Architectural style: Mid 19th Century Revival, Late 19th And 20th Century Revivals, Late Victorian
- NRHP reference No.: 88001058
- Added to NRHP: July 14, 1988

Westminster is a village in Windham County, Vermont, United States. The population was 287 at the 2020 census. Most of the village is listed on the National Register of Historic Places in 1988 as the Westminster Village Historic District.

== Geography ==
According to the United States Census Bureau, the village has a total area of 1.3 sq mi (3.4 km^{2}), all land. The village is centered on the junction of U.S. Route 5 with School and Grout Streets, and extends mainly along US 5. Its western end is roughly Metcalf Drive and Cox Street, and its eastern end is the old cemetery. On School Street, the district extends north at least as far as Thompson Road.

== History ==
Westminster, located in the southeastern part of Vermont, was the first town to be chartered, in 1736 by the Province of Massachusetts Bay. The layout of the village center took place in 1736–1737, and initially called for an unusually broad Main Street (now US 5). The basic plan for the village today still shows elements of this plan, with a still-broad main road layout (reduced in width in 1781 after the original plan was deemed too wide), and in the placement of municipal and civic buildings. The town hall, for example, is built on the foundation of the 18th century colonial meeting house, retaining its exterior dimensions.

Because Westminster was in an area disputed by several colonial governments, it had a second charter issued by the Province of New Hampshire in 1740, only to have that charter invalidated by a crown decision awarding the Vermont area to the Province of New York in 1764. This territorial dispute culminated in the formation of Vermont as a separate state, but not without bloodshed. Two men were fatally wounded in the Westminster massacre on March 13, 1775, in a dispute between supporters of the New York claim (led by the local New York-appointed sheriff), and a group of anti-New Yorkers occupying the courthouse. This event was significant in leading to the eventual declaration of the Vermont Republic in 1777, and its admission to the Union as a separate state in 1793. Westminster was one of the seats of the republic's legislature, and served as a county seat until 1787.

== Demographics ==
Historical population
Census	Pop.	Note	%±
1920	313		—
1930	320		2.2%
1940	270		−15.6%
1950	298		10.4%
1960	333		11.7%
1970	446		33.9%
1980	319		−28.5%
1990	399		25.1%
2000	276		−30.8%
2010	291		5.4%
2020	287		−1.4%
U.S. Decennial Census

As of the census of 2000, there were 276 people, 118 households, and 78 families residing in the village. The population density was 209.1 people per square mile (80.7/km^{2}). There were 124 housing units at an average density of 93.9/sq mi (36.3/km^{2}). The racial makeup of the village was 100.00% White.

There were 118 households, out of which 28.0% had children under the age of 18 living with them, 57.6% were married couples living together, 7.6% had a female householder with no husband present, and 33.1% were non-families. 25.4% of all households were made up of individuals, and 10.2% had someone living alone who was 65 years of age or older. The average household size was 2.34 and the average family size was 2.85.

In the village, the population was spread out, with 20.3% under the age of 18, 9.4% from 18 to 24, 21.0% from 25 to 44, 33.3% from 45 to 64, and 15.9% who were 65 years of age or older. The median age was 44 years. For every 100 females, there were 84.0 males. For every 100 females age 18 and over, there were 86.4 males.

The median income for a household in the village was $47,969, and the median income for a family was $54,643. Males had a median income of $30,833 versus $26,375 for females. The per capita income for the village was $22,261. None of the families and 2.7% of the population were living below the poverty line, including no under eighteens and 5.1% of those over 64.

== See also ==
- Westminster (town), Vermont
- National Register of Historic Places listings in Windham County, Vermont
