= WTSA-FM =

- Brattleboro, Vermont; United States
- Frequency: 96.7 MHz
- Branding: Magic 96.7

Programming
- Format: Adult contemporary
- Affiliations: Compass Media Networks; Premiere Networks

Ownership
- Owner: Jared Goodell; (Community Media, LLC)
- Sister stations: WEEY; WFYX; WKKN; WTHK; WTSA

History
- First air date: December 15, 1975
- Former call signs: WMMJ (1978–1984)
- Call sign meaning: Tri-State Area

Technical information
- Licensing authority: FCC
- Facility ID: 67765
- Class: A
- ERP: 5,200 watts
- HAAT: 41 meters (135 ft)
- Transmitter coordinates: 42°53′21.2″N 72°36′45.3″W
- Repeater: 100.7 WTHK (Wilmington)

Links
- Public license information: Public file; LMS
- Webcast: Listen live
- Website: www.magic967.com

WTSA-FM (96.7 FM) is a radio station licensed to serve Brattleboro, Vermont. It first signed on in 1975. The station airs an adult contemporary music format as "Magic 96.7".

The station was assigned the WTSA-FM call letters by the Federal Communications Commission on July 1, 1984.

In September 2025, Four Seasons Media Inc, sold WTSA-FM and sister station WTSA to Jared Goodell's Community Media LLC. On January 1, 2026, WTSA-FM dropped the "TSA FM" branding and shifted its format from hot adult contemporary to adult contemporary, as "Magic 96.7", revamping the entire weekday lineup, including adding John Tesh on weeknights.
