= WTSA (AM) =

- Brattleboro, Vermont; United States
- Broadcast area: Brattleboro, Vermont
- Frequency: 1450 kHz
- Branding: All News Radio 106.5 & 99.5

Programming
- Format: All-news radio

Ownership
- Owner: Jared Goodell; (Community Media, LLC)
- Sister stations: WEEY; WFYX; WKKN; WTHK; WTSA-FM

History
- First air date: April 19, 1950
- Former call signs: WTSA (1950–1984); WMMJ (1984–1986)
- Call sign meaning: Tri-State Area (Vermont, New Hampshire, Massachusetts)

Technical information
- Licensing authority: FCC
- Facility ID: 67763
- Class: C
- Power: 1,000 watts (unlimited)
- Transmitter coordinates: 42°52′13.3″N 72°33′33.32″W
- Translators: 99.5 W258DQ (Brattleboro); 106.5 W293AB (Keene, New Hampshire)

Links
- Public license information: Public file; LMS
- Webcast: Listen live
- Website: www.newsradiokeene.com

WTSA (1450 AM, "All News Radio 106.5 & 99.5") is a radio station licensed to serve Brattleboro, Vermont. The station is owned by Jared Goodell's Community Media LLC and broadcasts an all-news radio format, also carried by FM translators W258DQ (99.5) in Brattleboro and W293AB (106.5) in Keene, New Hampshire. WTSA first signed on in 1950.

== History ==
WTSA signed on April 19, 1950, as a sister station to WKBR in Manchester, New Hampshire. The station was first in Brattleboro and was positioned to serve Vermont, New Hampshire and Massachusetts. WTSA was sold to the Puritan Radio Group, and later to McGavern/Guild. McGavern changed the middle of the road format to top 40 in the mid 1960s. WTSA was always the most popular station in the region, being a strongly personality directed format. In 1967 WTSA had a Hooper Index listenership of 49.7 market share out of a 13-station measure. WTSA-FM would be added in 1975, and with ownership changes, the format on AM was moved to FM. The station became WMMJ on July 1, 1984, but was reassigned the WTSA call letters by the Federal Communications Commission on August 1, 1986.

On March 4, 2019, WTSA changed its format from sports to active rock, branded as "99.5 The Beast" in reflection of its FM translator, W258DQ (99.5).

In September 2025, Four Seasons Media Inc sold WTSA/W258DQ and WTSA-FM to Jared Goodell's Community Media LLC. On January 1, 2026, WTSA changed its format from active rock to country, branded as "Country 99.5". After Community Media bought Great Eastern Radio's stations in the Brattleboro–Keene market in June 2026, the country format moved to newly-acquired WEEY and WFYX; WTSA then launched an all-news format, and added a second translator, W293AB (106.5 FM), in Keene.

== Translator ==
| Call sign | Frequency | City of license | FID | ERP (W) | Class | Transmitter coordinates | FCC info |
|---|---|---|---|---|---|---|---|
| W258DQ | 99.5 FM | Brattleboro, Vermont | 202741 | 99 | D | 42°53′21″N 72°36′45″W | LMS |
| W293AB | 106.5 FM | Keene, New Hampshire | 17796 | 150 | D | 42°54′57.3″N 72°19′50.3″W | LMS |
