= WHDQ =

- Claremont, New Hampshire; United States
- Broadcast area: Lebanon-Hanover-White River Junction area
- Frequency: 106.1 MHz (HD Radio)
- Branding: Q106

Programming
- Format: Classic rock
- Subchannels: HD2: Adult contemporary "101.7 & 106.7 The Penguin"; HD3: Same as HD2

Ownership
- Owner: Great Eastern Radio, LLC
- Sister stations: WGXL; WTSV; WWOD; WXXK

History
- First air date: May 19, 1947
- Former call signs: WLOB (1947–1948); WTSV-FM (1948–1972); WECM (1972–1985)
- Former frequencies: 102.1 MHz (1947–1948)
- Call sign meaning: Northern New England's Music Headquarters

Technical information
- Licensing authority: FCC
- Facility ID: 17798
- Class: B
- ERP: 1,600 watts
- HAAT: 685 meters (2,247 ft)
- Transmitter coordinates: 43°26′15.3″N 72°27′6.3″W
- Translator: See § Translators and booster
- Repeater: See § Translators and booster

Links
- Public license information: Public file; LMS
- Webcast: Listen live HD2 and HD3: Listen live
- Website: www.theqrocks.com HD2 and HD3: www.thepenguinradio.com

WHDQ (106.1 FM, "Q106") is a radio station broadcasting a classic rock format. Licensed to Claremont, New Hampshire, United States, the station serves the Lebanon-Rutland-White River Junction area. The station is owned by Jeffrey Shapiro's Great Eastern Radio. The station's transmitter is located atop Mount Ascutney in Vermont. WHDQ's signal is also broadcast over a translator—W294AB (106.7 FM) in Hanover, New Hampshire—and a booster—WHDQ-FM1 in Rutland, Vermont.

== History ==
The station that would become WHDQ first went on the air May 19, 1947, as WLOB at 102.1 MHz; it was owned by the Claremont Daily Eagle. In 1948, it became WTSV-FM, an affiliate of the Granite State Network. The station used the call sign WECM from 1972 to 1985 while broadcasting from 106.1 FM and went under the names of "Stereo 106" and "M-106". During that time it simulcasted some shows on former Top 40/NBC Radio Network/CBS Radio Network station WTSV (1230 AM) and was located on Washington Street in Claremont, next to the AM radio tower.

Q106 has arguably one of the richest and most colorful histories of any radio station in northern New England. The station first went under both AOR and MOR formats from the early 1970s until 1983, when the station flipped to a Top 40/CHR format. For almost ten years in total beginning in 1983, it was the area's dominant CHR powerhouse as both WECM and WHDQ until March 1993 when the station dropped CHR and flipped back to AOR. Q106 was one of the first radio stations to carry the Imus in the Morning show, and one of the first stations to reinstate the show upon Don Imus' return to the airwaves in December 2007.

WHDQ, along with 29 other stations in northern New England formerly owned by Nassau Broadcasting Partners, was purchased at a bankruptcy auction by Carlisle Capital Corporation, a company controlled by Bill Binnie (owner of WBIN-TV in Derry), on May 22, 2012. The station, and 12 of the other stations, were then acquired by Vertical Capital Partners, controlled by Jeff Shapiro. The deal was completed on November 30, 2012. The Vertical Capital Partners stations were transferred to Shapiro's existing Great Eastern Radio group on January 1, 2013.

== Personalities ==
- Greg and The Morning Buzz
- House
- Elise Valentine
- Traci Fulton
- Gregg Parrotto

== Past personnel ==
- Dave Ashton
- Ken Barlow
- Big Joe
- Ted Bilodeau
- Bill Bogle (WECM)
- Bob Cady
- Dave Cooper
- Steve Cormier (WECM)
- Doug Daniels
- Doug Danzing - hosted 1st Sunday AM Oldies show
- Guy Dark
- John Dodge (WECM)
- Leif Erickson
- Bob Flint (WECM)
- Jen Foxx
- Tom Hoyt
- Peg Jett
- Dru Johnson
- Don Matsen
- Carl Metcalf (WECM)
- Ross Michaels
- Chris Mitchell
- Laurie Nelson (WECM)
- Lisa Peakes
- Jason Place
- Bev Porter (WECM)
- Rob Riley
- Bob Rivers (WECM)
- Rick Ross
- Brian Ryea
- Gary Seem (WECM)
- Sharon Steele
- Wally Wilcox
- Chris Picard
- Griffin Wert
- Art Steinberg
- Ken Webbley
- Michael Witthaus (WECM)
- Bruce Zeman
- Zip Zipfel (WECM)

== Translators and booster ==
WHDQ also broadcasts on the following translators and booster:

Call sign	Frequency	City of license	FID	ERP (W)	HAAT	Class	Transmitter coordinates	FCC info	Notes
WHDQ-FM1	106.1 FM	Rutland, Vermont	76669	13	688 m (2,257 ft)	D	43°38′22.2″N 72°50′10.3″W	LMS	Booster
W269DI	101.7 FM	Claremont, New Hampshire	46339	150	0 m (0 ft)	D	43°23′45.2″N 72°17′38.3″W	LMS	Relays WHDQ-HD2
W294AB	106.7 FM	Hanover, New Hampshire	17799	14	0 m (0 ft)	D	43°39′16.7″N 72°17′39.9″W	LMS	Relays WHDQ-HD3
