= WXXK =

- Lebanon, New Hampshire; United States
- Broadcast area: Lebanon-Hanover-White River Junction area
- Frequency: 100.5 MHz
- Branding: Kixx 100.5

Programming
- Format: Country music
- Affiliations: Westwood One; Premiere Radio Networks; Motor Racing Network

Ownership
- Owner: Great Eastern Radio, LLC
- Sister stations: WGXL; WHDQ; WTSV; WWOD

History
- First air date: December 18, 1990 (as WNTK-FM)
- Former call signs: WNTK-FM (1990–1992); WNBX (1992–1994); WUVR (1994–1996); WNBX (1996–1997); WVRR (1997)

Technical information
- Licensing authority: FCC
- Facility ID: 54790
- Class: C3
- ERP: 22,000 watts
- HAAT: 99 meters (325 ft)
- Transmitter coordinates: 43°39′18.2″N 72°17′40.3″W

Links
- Public license information: Public file; LMS
- Webcast: Listen live
- Website: www.kixx.com

WXXK (100.5 FM; "Kixx 100.5") is a radio station broadcasting a country music format. Licensed to Lebanon, New Hampshire, United States, the station serves the Lebanon-Rutland-White River Junction area. The station is owned by Great Eastern Radio, LLC and features programming from Westwood One and the Premiere Radio Networks.

== History ==
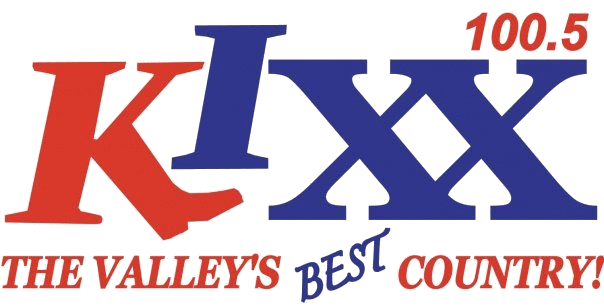
WXXK's logo before adding its simulcast on WKKN on October 1, 2012

The station went on the air as WNTK-FM on December 18, 1990. On November 30, 1992, the station changed its call sign to WNBX; on December 19, 1994, to WUVR; on March 11, 1996, back to WNBX; on February 15, 1997, to WVRR; and on March 31, 1997, to the current WXXK.

Until March 16, 2015, WXXK was simulcast in the Keene area on WKKN 101.9 FM. It had also been simulcast in southern Vermont on WTHK at 100.7 MHz in Wilmington.
