= WWJE-DT =

Television station in Derry, New Hampshire

ATSC 3.0 station
- Derry–Manchester, New Hampshire; Boston, Massachusetts; United States
- City: Derry, New Hampshire
- Channels: Digital: 27 (UHF), shared with WUNI; Virtual: 50

Programming
- Affiliations: 50.1: True Crime Network

Ownership
- Owner: TelevisaUnivision; (Univision Local Media, Inc.)
- Operator: Entravision Communications
- Sister stations: WUNI

History
- First air date: September 5, 1983
- Former call signs: WNDS (1983–2005); WZMY-TV (2005–2011); WBIN-TV (2011–2018)
- Former channel numbers: Analog: 50 (UHF, 1983–2008); Digital: 35 (UHF, 2002–2017)
- Former affiliations: Independent (1983–2006, 2011–2017); MyNetworkTV (2006–2011); Antenna TV (2017)
- Call sign meaning: "Justice Network"

Technical information
- Licensing authority: FCC
- Facility ID: 14682
- ERP: 400 kW
- HAAT: 356 m (1,168 ft)
- Transmitter coordinates: 42°23′2.7″N 71°29′35.3″W

Links
- Public license information: Public file; LMS

WWJE-DT (channel 50) is a television station licensed to Derry, New Hampshire, United States, serving the Boston area as an affiliate of True Crime Network. It is owned by TelevisaUnivision alongside Univision station WUNI (channel 66). The two stations share main studios and transmitter facilities on Parmenter Road in Hudson, Massachusetts; WWJE is operated separately from WUNI by Entravision Communications, owner of UniMás affiliate WUTF-TV (channel 27).

WWJE formerly broadcast local newscasts from a studio located in Concord, branded as the NH1 News Network or NH1 News. Besides WBIN, sister radio station WNNH also used the NH1 News branding from August 2015 to August 2017. WBIN-TV was one of only two television stations based in the state of New Hampshire to broadcast local newscasts (alongside WMUR-TV), as much of the state is part of the Boston media market. On February 17, 2017, WBIN canceled its newscasts as part of a wind-down of the station's operations following the sale of its spectrum in the Federal Communications Commission's incentive auction.

The station shut down its channel 35 transmitter on Merrill Hill in Hudson, New Hampshire, on September 15, 2017, and began operating on channel 27 through a channel sharing agreement with channel 66 (then WUTF-DT); the WBIN-TV license was subsequently sold by Carlisle One Media, a company controlled by Bill Binnie, to WUNI's owner, Univision Communications.

== History ==
=== Prior history of channel 50 in New Hampshire ===
The channel 50 allocation in southern New Hampshire originally belonged to WXPO-TV in Manchester, New Hampshire, which launched in October 1969. It operated from two studios: its offices and master production facilities were located on Dutton Street in downtown Lowell, Massachusetts; however, its transmitter and "main" studio was on Governor Dinsmore Road in Windham, New Hampshire, to comply with Federal Communications Commission (FCC) regulations requiring that a station's transmitter be located within 15 miles (24 km) of its city of license.

However, the station's coverage in many parts of Greater Boston was spotty at best. The station's Lowell studios were located less than 1,000 feet (305 m) from the transmitter of WLLH, making high-quality production impossible during the day due to RF interference with the cameras. Advertisers were scared off when the Lowell Sun blacklisted anyone who bought commercials on the station. Bills went unpaid for several months. By early 1970, 90% of the station's staff was removed from the payroll, although many continued with the station, believing it could pull through. The Lowell studio was closed down that spring; finally, in June the power company pulled the plug at the Windham studios during a Maverick rerun, taking WXPO off the air.

On July 17, 1973, channel 50 returned to the air with a test transmission, with plans to return the station to the air later that year, possibly as New Hampshire's CBS affiliate. Those plans never materialized, and the WXPO-TV license was deleted in 1975.

=== WNDS ===
The final WNDS logo, used from circa 2004 until September 26, 2005. It is a modified version of a logo that was introduced in 1998.

The current iteration of channel 50 signed on the air on September 5, 1983, as WNDS, an independent station known on-air as "The Winds of New England". It was owned by CTV of Derry, a company not related to the CTV Television Network in Canada. The program included some cartoons like Scooby-Doo and Super Friends in the morning hours, religious shows like The 700 Club late in the morning, sitcoms on midday afternoons, cartoons for an hour or so after 3 p.m., more sitcoms in the evenings and late nights, and a movie in prime time. Sitcoms came from the Viacom and Paramount libraries, including such well-known series as I Love Lucy, The Brady Bunch, Happy Days, Laverne and Shirley and The Andy Griffith Show, among others.

The station acquired some of the programming assets of WNHT (channel 21, frequency now occupied by WPXG-TV) in 1989 after that station shut down on March 31; the deal did not include the channel 21 license or WNHT's CBS affiliation. In the 1990s, the station increased cartoons a bit and began running more recent sitcoms and drama shows.

In 1996, WNDS added programming from the Global Shopping Network (GSN) overnights. In January 1997, the station began running Global Shopping Network programming 15 hours a day, with entertainment programming continuing from 3 to 11 p.m. On April 5, 1997, GSN began programming the station full-time with a 24-hour home shopping format as part of a planned purchase of the station. However, GSN soon ran into financial problems; after it missed a payment for the station, CTV of Derry canceled the sale and reverted WNDS to its previous general entertainment format that June. CTV held onto channel 50 until 2004, when it sold the station to Shooting Star Broadcasting.

=== WZMY-TV ===
Soon after assuming control, in August 2005, Shooting Star Broadcasting announced that WNDS would change its call letters to WZMY-TV and its branding to "My TV". At that time, the station overhauled its schedule, based on viewer responses on the old WNDS website. The changes were implemented on-air on September 26, 2005.

WZMY's first logo as a MyNetworkTV affiliate (its second as "My TV"), used from September 5, 2006, through May 26, 2011.

On February 22, 2006, News Corporation announced the launch of a new network called MyNetworkTV, which created in response to another upstart network that was also set to launch that September, The CW (an amalgamated network that originally consisted primarily of UPN and The WB's higher-rated programs).

Since WZMY had already filed a trademark in mid-2005 for use of the "MyTV" name, it was speculated that WZMY would take legal action against News Corporation over its similar name. Ultimately on July 21, 2006, WZMY's My TV Club newsletter announced that the station would become the region's MyNetworkTV affiliate – giving channel 50 the first network affiliation in its history – this was later revealed on July 24 to the media and visitors to WZMY's website, and to the general public on July 26. Until the announcements were made, Boston and Southern New Hampshire had been the largest market where MyNetworkTV had not yet signed a full-time affiliate. With WZMY affiliating with MyNetworkTV upon the network's launch on September 5, 2006, the station continued to use its "My TV" branding, though the logo was changed to reflect MyNetworkTV's logo scheme (a different logo had been in use in the year following the 2005 relaunch).

In December 2009, the station laid off seven employees as part of a strategy change to streamline operations and change some of the programming options to be more hyperlocal. Operation of WZMY was taken over by New Age Media, LLC, making it a sister station to WPXT and WPME in Portland, Maine. The station added a digital subchannel affiliated with Universal Sports in June 2010.

=== WBIN-TV ===
Original version of the WBIN-TV logo, used from May 27, 2011, through September 2012. The station then used a similar logo featuring its channel 18 slot on most Comcast systems, with this logo remaining as a secondary logo.

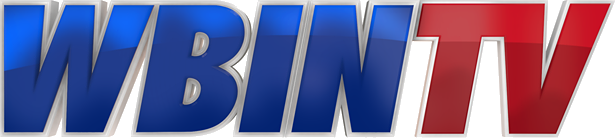
Simplified version of the WBIN-TV logo, used from 2014 through December 2017

On March 3, 2011, Portsmouth-based Carlisle One Media, Inc., a company controlled by Bill Binnie, announced that it had reached an agreement to purchase WZMY-TV. The sale was completed on May 17; ten days later, the call letters were changed to WBIN-TV. It also dropped the "My TV New England" branding, choosing to refer to itself using its call letters.

"WBIN Classics" logo for channel 50.2, used from January 2015 to September 2017

Binnie originally indicated that WBIN-TV would retain its affiliations with MyNetworkTV and Universal Sports; however, the station announced on June 15 that it would leave MyNetworkTV and become an independent again as part of an increased local emphasis, with the service's programming moving to WSBK-TV (channel 38) on September 19, while Universal Sports restructured itself into a cable- and satellite-only channel in January 2012, then shut down in October 2015. Nonetheless, the station added an additional subchannel, carrying TheCoolTV, in October 2011; additionally, it replaced Universal Sports with Live Well Network on January 1, 2012. In July 2012, WBIN-TV terminated its affiliation with TheCoolTV; it was replaced with WeatherNation TV on January 14, 2013. The station also made moves to strengthen its programming, including the addition of Entertainment Tonight and The Insider on September 10, 2012 (Entertainment Tonight had previously aired in New Hampshire on WMUR-TV; both programs also remained on WSBK-TV). In December 2014, Grit replaced WeatherNation TV on their DT3 sub-channel. In January 2015, Live Well Network was replaced with "WBIN Classics" on the DT2 sub-channel, featuring original programming as well as programming from the Antenna TV network.

WBIN was the flagship of Binnie Media, a group that also included WYCN-LP (channel 13) in Nashua and 16 northern New England radio stations formerly owned by Nassau Broadcasting Partners.

=== Spectrum sale; relaunch as WWJE-DT ===
On February 17, 2017, Binnie Media announced that WBIN-TV had sold its spectrum in the FCC's spectrum incentive auction for $68.2 million; concurrently, the station's "remaining television license rights" would be acquired by an undisclosed "major television group" for an estimated $10–30 million in what it described as a "channel-sharing sale". In a statement, Bill Binnie said that the sale "makes WBIN-TV one of the most valuable media properties in the history of New Hampshire media." Binnie Media also announced that WBIN-TV would "cease broadcasting in the coming months", with proceeds from the sale going toward the acquisition of additional digital, outdoor, and radio assets.

On May 4, 2017, WBIN-TV filed to channel-share with WUTF-DT (channel 66, now WUNI). In the channel sharing agreement, reached on January 11, 2016, the stations agreed to grant put and call rights that could result in WUTF's owner, Univision Local Media, acquiring the WBIN license; under the terms of the agreement, Univision would be required to change WBIN-TV's call letters as a condition of the sale. Univision exercised its option to buy the WBIN-TV license for $16,764,133.70 on May 8, 2017. WBIN-TV ceased broadcasting on channel 35 on September 15, 2017, and began to share channel 27 with WUTF-DT; as of September 2017, only WBIN's main channel is broadcast using virtual channel 50. WBIN-TV began phasing out its syndicated programming following the announcement of the spectrum sale; by December 2017, the station's schedule consisted primarily of Antenna TV programming, with the talk show Harry (which also aired on NBC Boston) serving as its last syndicated program. Univision's purchase of the station was completed on December 21, 2017; the station then became a Justice Network affiliate. The call letters were changed to WWJE-DT on January 12, 2018.

Antenna TV was absent from the Boston TV market until it was picked up by WCRN-LD on May 5, 2020. Grit is now carried on the primary channel of WDPX-TV.

== Local programming ==
During its first year on the air, WNDS ran a number of locally produced programs, including a cooking show (The Yankee Gourmet), a children's show (Just Kidding Around) and a weekly prime time variety show (The Best of New Hampshire). All of these shows were canceled by the end of 1985. The station also covered live local sports, including high school football, college hockey and minor league baseball. WNDS also ran a candlepin bowling show each weekend at noon called Candlepin Stars and Strikes, which aired from 1984 until August 2005.

Prior to affiliating with the Global Shopping Network in April 1997, WNDS also ran three additional shows: High School Sports Review (which provided high school sports news in the New Hampshire and Massachusetts region), Sports Wrap (a sports talk show discussing Boston sports), and WNDS News Up Front (a local newsmagazine). When regular programming was restored in June, these three shows were not resurrected. In addition, during the early 2000s, channel 50 ran a public affairs program titled Capitol Ideas hosted by Arnie Arnesen. Friday Night Chaos, a 30-minute weekly show from independent wrestling promotion Chaotic Wrestling, aired on WNDS from 2001 to 2002. The station also aired a locally produced talk show hosted by singer-comedian Bucky Lewis.

After the station's relaunch as WZMY-TV, much of its local programming consisted of visits to businesses around the region, in a format known as "My Shows". The original show under this format was My New England, but variants focusing on specific topics were subsequently added, such as My Premier Bride and My Good Health and My Home and Garden. Additionally, several local businesses (particularly car dealerships, but sometimes other businesses such as Dollar Bill's Discount World) produced programs that appeared on weekend mornings; those programs had also appeared on WNDS. At the time of the relaunch, two other local programs also existed: a talk show entitled MyTV Prime (which originally aired from 9 to 10 p.m. and later from 8 to 9:30 p.m.), and Wild World (a review of action sports around the region, which was produced by Dan Egan). However, the station subsequently discontinued these shows from its lineup (although Wild World was still produced for other outlets).

In its later years as "My TV", the station adopted a "Branded Entertainment" model, focusing on local product placement. Most of the station's local programming during this time, in addition to the remaining "My Shows"-formatted programs, included 30-minute wrestling show from the Massachusetts-based "Big Time Wrestling" promotion (which aired on the station from May 1, 2009, until moving to WMFP in December 2010), Scorch's PFG-TV (a talk show hosted by WGIR-FM personality Scorch), The Chef's Plate (which showcases New Hampshire's top chefs creating their signature dishes), The Steve Katsos Show (also aired on sister station WPME in Portland), Debra Crosby's Talent Quest TV Show, Quiet Desperation (a reality comedy series based in Allston, Massachusetts), Inside the Revolution (a spotlight on the New England Revolution), AFO Proving Grounds, Animation Nation, Boston Ruit, theGreenScreen.tv, AsianBoston TV, and Iron Brides, a reality competition show featuring brides-to-be. Many of these programs were produced in collaboration with independent production companies through what the station referred to as "MyTV New England Studios". Some of these programs were retained following the relaunch as WBIN-TV, though Quiet Desperation was dropped following the sale to Carlisle One due to concerns over the program's content, and Scorch's PFG-TV and the local history show Regional Chronicles subsequently moved to WMFP.

Following Carlisle One Media's acquisition of the station, WBIN-TV announced that it would offer increased coverage of high school, college, and professional sports; this includes telecasts of New Hampshire Wildcats hockey and basketball (produced by the University of New Hampshire in association with Pack Network) Merrimack Warriors hockey, and the UMass Minutemen.

The Language of Business, a locally produced business newsmagazine, began airing on WBIN-TV on June 5, 2016.

=== News operation ===
Soon after signing-on in the fall of 1983, WNDS began airing nightly newscasts at 6 and 10 p.m. The news staff included news anchor Larry Sparano, sportscaster Doug Brown, and meteorologist Al Kaprielian. The weekend newscasts were dropped in 1985, followed by the weeknight editions by 1986.

On September 28, 1998, WNDS debuted News Now, consisting of newscasts at 7 and 10 p.m. weeknights, as well as weekend afternoons (the latter of which were dropped by early 2002). By 2003, the 11:57 a.m. weekday news update was expanded into a half-hour newscast at noon. Shortly after Shooting Star bought the station, the noon broadcast was discontinued, and the 10 p.m. edition was cut down to 10 minutes. In addition to the full newscasts, some news/weather updates as well as standalone weather updates from chief meteorologist Al Kaprielian were provided throughout the day.

When the station was relaunched as WZMY-TV, the 10 p.m. newscast was dropped entirely; the early evening newscast was renamed MyTV Now and aired weeknights from 7:30 to 8 p.m. An additional 60-minute news and commentary program, MyTV Prime, aired from 9 to 10 p.m. On March 10, 2006, however, the two programs were consolidated into a new, 90-minute version of MyTV Prime that aired from 8 to 9:30 p.m. News was no longer provided outside of that program. By July 2006, channel 50 had discontinued MyTV Prime in favor of sitcom reruns. Weather updates from Al Kaprielian were still provided each hour from noon to midnight; for a time, these were accompanied by news updates that used the MyTV Now title.

WZMY dissolved its news department completely (with the exception of weather) in November 2007, after Nicole Papageorge and Mike DeBlasi (the longest-tenured on-air employee after Kaprielian) departed the station. As a result, WZMY eliminated all daily news cut-ins, political commentary, and locally produced public affairs programming.

Channel 50 was well known in New England for meteorologist Al Kaprielian. His quirky, offbeat style made him a minor celebrity in Southern New Hampshire. As a result of his popularity, he appeared as a "Guest Meteorologist" on The Weather Channel's Abrams & Bettes: Beyond the Forecast on November 10, 2006. He had worked for WNDS/WZMY for his whole career. However, as a result of the station's December 2009 cutbacks, Kaprielian was laid off from the station, with his final day on-air occurring on December 31; as a result, the station discontinued its weather updates. Kaprielian returned to WBIN-TV on August 20, 2012, providing hourly forecasts from 2 to 9 p.m.; he also provided forecasts for Binnie Media's radio stations. Kaprielian left the station in 2015.

Soon after the sale to Carlisle One, the station announced plans to re-establish a local news department, including a bureau at Carlisle One's headquarters in Portsmouth; rival ABC affiliate WMUR-TV (channel 9) already operated a Portsmouth bureau. On September 29, 2011, WBIN debuted a new half-hour weeknight newscast. Known as News at 10 on WBIN, the show was produced in partnership with the Davenport, Iowa-based Independent News Network (INN). The news anchor and meteorologist were provided by the centralized news operation and other personnel from INN filled-in as necessary. WBIN maintained three local reporters who contributed relevant Southern New Hampshire content. All of the broadcasts originated from INN's Davenport studios. There was no regularly scheduled sports report. The station maintained additional partnerships with the Boston Globe (which originally provided headlines through an on-screen ticker), the Nashua Telegraph, and Bloomberg. WBIN indicated plans to further expand its newscast offerings, including long-range plans for a morning newscast; Binnie stated his intention to construct "a public affairs infrastructure that will attract people who are serious about news in New Hampshire."

In addition to News at 10, WBIN-TV sponsored several debates, including a Charlie Rose-moderated Republican presidential debate at Dartmouth College on October 11, 2011, in association with Bloomberg and The Washington Post, as well as one gubernatorial and two congressional debates at its Derry studios in partnership with various New Hampshire newspapers and AARP in October 2012. The station also aired a daily INN-produced half-hour political newscast, Campaign Countdown, at 5 p.m. during the latter portion of the 2012 election season. On February 6, 2012, WBIN began airing the syndicated morning show The Daily Buzz from 6 to 9 a.m. At the time, the station planned to add a political show to its lineup by 2014.

WBIN-TV moved its news operation to the former Walker School in Concord in 2014 (the remainder of the station's operations remained in Derry), with the school's auditorium being repurposed for debates held by the station. The building, which was acquired by Binnie Media at auction from the Concord School District on November 15, 2012, also houses Binnie's Concord radio stations as well as Binnie Media's offices. WBIN also established bureaus throughout New Hampshire, including Laconia (at a former police station), Manchester, and Lebanon, in addition to Derry and Portsmouth.

WBIN-TV ended its INN-produced newscast on April 26, 2013, leaving Kaprielian's forecasts as the only local news content on the station. The station also laid off two of its three reporters. The cancellation did not impact WBIN's plans for the former Walker School; Binnie stated in August 2013 that "it's more important to make a wholesale commitment, which we will do with NH1 Network," while Robb Atkinson, WBIN's news director, would subsequently concede that "we weren't happy with the quality." The station debuted a weeknight 90-minute early evening news block at 5 p.m. and a nightly 10 p.m. newscast on September 15, 2014 under the NH1 News Network branding, based out of the newsroom in the Walker School building in Concord and the Nashua, Derry, Portsmouth, Laconia, and Lebanon news bureaus; WBIN also produced a weekly magazine program on Sunday mornings, and the news operation supplies half-hourly newscasts to Binnie Media's radio stations. While the new newscasts competed against the longer-established WMUR-TV news operation, Lee Kinberg, the executive vice president of NH1 News Network, stated that the newscasts were "very different from Channel 9," and included more coverage of the Seacoast Region compared to WMUR. WBIN's newscasts also emphasized coverage of politics, with former Nashua Telegraph State House reporter Kevin Landrigan serving as chief political correspondent and longtime CNN political editor Paul Steinhauser becoming NH1's political director on January 1, 2015; Atkinson has said that "We want to own politics in New Hampshire." In addition to the weeknight newscasts, the station announced its intention to launch a four-hour morning newscast and an hour-long noon newscast by 2015. Initially, the 10 p.m. half-hour weekend newscast didn't debut with the news department, but it did launch on October 25, 2014. The first new weekday newscast to launch since the founding of the news operation was NH1 News at 6:30, which debuted on September 21, 2015.

WBIN-TV aired its final newscasts on February 16, 2017; the following day, the station laid off most of the news staff concurrent with the announcement of the sale of the station's spectrum in the FCC spectrum auction. In a statement, Binnie Media said that NH1 News would continue operations on radio and online.

==== Notable former on-air staff ====
- Doug Brown — sports
- Gail Huff – special correspondent and news Contributor (NH1 News)
- Al Kaprielian — meteorologist

== Technical information ==
=== Subchannel ===
The station's ATSC 1.0 channel is carried on the multiplexed signal of ABC affiliate WCVB-TV:

Subchannel provided by WWJE-DT (ATSC 1.0)
Subchannel	Res.	Short name	Programming	ATSC 1.0 host
50.1	480i	WWJE-TV	True Crime Network	WCVB-TV

=== ATSC 3.0 lighthouse ===
Subchannels of WUNI and WWJE-DT (ATSC 3.0)
License	Subchannel	Res.	Short name	Programming
WUNI	2.1	1080p	WGBH*NX	PBS (WGBH-TV)
WUNI	4.1	1080p	WBZ*NX	CBS (WBZ-TV)
WUNI	5.1	1080p	WCVB*NX	ABC (WCVB-TV)
WUNI	15.1	1080p	WBTS*NX	NBC (WBTS-CD)
WUNI	25.1	1080p	WFXT*NX	Fox (WFXT)
WUNI	66.1	1080p	WUNI*NX	Univision
WWJE-DT	50.1	480p	WWJE*NX	True Crime Network (via WCVB-TV)

Subchannel broadcast with digital rights management

=== Analog-to-digital conversion ===
WWJE-DT (as WZMY-TV) shut down its analog signal, over UHF channel 50, on December 1, 2008, which was within the permissible 90-day window prior to the original February 17, 2009, deadline for full-power television stations in the United States to transition from analog to digital broadcasts under federal mandate (this deadline was later moved to June 12, 2009). The station's digital signal continued to broadcast on its pre-transition UHF channel 35, using virtual channel 50.

In 2010, WZMY-TV began broadcasting prime time MyNetworkTV programming in high definition.

=== Former translators ===
As WBIN-TV, the station's programming was also seen on three translators in southern New Hampshire. All three stations were owned by New Hampshire 1 Network, Inc., a sister company to Carlisle One Media that previously owned WYCN-CD in Nashua, New Hampshire (now NBC-owned WBTS-CD); historically co-owned with that station, the three repeaters were not included in a subsequent sale of WYCN.

All three facilities were construction permits; the accompanying analog signals left the air on January 3, 2012, to accommodate the construction of these signals. Since December 28, 2012, the stations were broadcasting under special temporary authority from a tower at the WBIN studios in Derry while constructing their permanent facilities in order to maintain their broadcast licenses. All three stations were shut down October 4, 2017, and surrendered their licenses the following day.

- WORK-LD 3 Nashua
- W04DP-D Concord
- W07DR-D Manchester

== See also ==
- Channel 18 branded TV stations in the United States
- Channel 35 digital TV stations in the United States
- Channel 50 virtual TV stations in the United States
- List of television stations in New Hampshire
