= List of radio stations in Vermont =

List of FCC-licensed radio stations in Vermont

The following is a list of FCC-licensed radio stations in the U.S. state of Vermont, which can be sorted by their call signs, frequencies, cities of license, licensees, and programming formats.

== List of radio stations ==
Call sign	Frequency	City of License	Owner	Format
WAVJ	103.3 FM	Waterbury	K-Love, Inc.	Worship music (Air1)
WBTN	1370 AM	Bennington	Shires Media Partnership, Inc.	Variety
WBTN-FM	94.3 FM	Bennington	Vermont Public Co.	Public radio
WBTV-LP	99.3 FM	Burlington	Vermont Community Access Media (VCAM)	Variety
WCFR	1480 AM	Springfield	Sugar River Media, LLC	Classic hits
WCKJ	90.5 FM	St. Johnsbury	Christian Ministries, Inc.	Contemporary Christian
WCLY	1490 AM	Bridport	Christian Ministries Inc.	Christian radio
WCMD-FM	89.9 FM	Barre	Christian Ministries, Inc.	Contemporary Christian
WCMK	91.9 FM	Putney	Christian Ministries, Inc.	Contemporary Christian
WCVR	1320 AM	Randolph	Sugar River Media, LLC	Country
WCVT	101.7 FM	Stowe	Radio Vermont Classics, L.L.C.	Classic hits
WDEV	550 AM	Waterbury	Radio Vermont, Inc.	Full service
WDEV-FM	96.1 FM	Warren	Radio Vermont, Inc.	Full service
WDKM	92.5 FM	Poultney	Northway Broadcasting, LLC	Classic hits
WDOT	95.7 FM	Danville	Montpelier Broadcasting Inc.	Adult album alternative
WDVT	94.5 FM	Rutland	6 Johnson Road Licenses, Inc.	Classic rock
WEQX	102.7 FM	Manchester	Northshire Communications, Inc.	Alternative rock
WEVT-LP	98.1 FM	Enosburg Falls	Spavin Cure Historical Group	Oldies
WEZF	92.9 FM	Burlington	Vox AM/FM, LLC	Adult contemporary
WFTF	90.9 FM	Rutland	Christian Ministries, Inc.	Worship music (Air1)
WFVR-LP	96.5 FM	South Royalton	Royalton Community Radio	Variety
WGDH	91.7 FM	Hardwick	Central Vermont Community Radio Corporation	Variety
WGDR	91.1 FM	Plainfield	Central Vermont Community Radio Corporation	Variety
WGLG	89.9 FM	Swanton	Christian Ministries, Inc.	Contemporary Christian
WGLV	91.7 FM	Woodstock	Christian Ministries, Inc.	Contemporary Christian
WGLY-FM	91.5 FM	Bolton	Christian Ministries, Inc.	Contemporary Christian
WGMT	97.7 FM	Lyndon	Vermont Broadcast Associates, Inc.	Adult contemporary
WIFY	93.7 FM	Addison	Radio Broadcasting Services, Inc.	Adult album alternative
WIKE	1490 AM	Newport	Vermont Broadcast Associates, Inc.	Classic rock
WIZN	106.7 FM	Vergennes	Hall Communications, Inc.	Classic rock
WJEN	105.3 FM	Killington	6 Johnson Road Licenses, Inc.	Country
WJJR	98.1 FM	Rutland	6 Johnson Road Licenses, Inc.	Adult contemporary
WJJZ	94.5 FM	Irasburg	Vermont Broadcast Associates, Inc.	Country
WJOY	1230 AM	Burlington	Hall Communications, Inc.	Adult standards/MOR
WJPL-LP	92.1 FM	Barre	Vermont Christian Radio, Inc.	Christian
WJSC-FM	90.7 FM	Johnson	Board of Trustees, Vermont State College	College
WJSY-LP	96.1 FM	Newport	Voice in the Kingdom Radio, Inc.	Christian
WKAF	1420 AM	St. Albans	Sky Radio & Press, LLC	Mainstream rock
WKKN	101.9 FM	Westminster	Great Eastern Radio, LLC	Adult contemporary
WKVT-FM	92.7 FM	Brattleboro	Saga Communications of New England, LLC	Classic hits
WKXH	105.5 FM	St. Johnsbury	Vermont Broadcast Associates, Inc.	Country
WLVB	93.9 FM	Morrisville	Radio Vermont, Inc.	Country
WMNV	104.1 FM	Rupert	Capital Media Corporation	Religious
WMOO	92.1 FM	Derby Center	Vermont Broadcast Associates, Inc.	Adult top 40
WMRW-LP	94.5 FM	Warren	Roostwork Inc.	Variety
WMTZ-LP	95.7 FM	Rutland	Green Mountain Adventist Media, Inc.	Christian
WMUD	101.5 FM	Brandon	Mud Radio LLC	Americana
WNCH	88.1 FM	Norwich	Vermont Public Co.	Classical
WNCS	104.7 FM	Montpelier	Montpelier Broadcasting, Inc.	Adult album alternative
WNUB-FM	88.3 FM	Northfield	The Trustees of the Norwich University	Alternative
WOKO	98.9 FM	Burlington	Hall Communications, Inc.	Country
WOMM-LP	105.9 FM	Burlington	The Big Heavy World Foundation, Inc.	Variety
WOOL	91.5 FM	Bellows Falls	Great Falls Community Broadcasting Company.	Variety, Community radio
WOTX	93.7 FM	Lunenberg	Alexxon, LLC	Classic rock
WOXM	90.1 FM	Middlebury	Vermont Public Co.	Classical
WRFK	107.1 FM	Barre	Great Eastern Radio, LLC	Classic rock
WRMC-FM	91.1 FM	Middlebury	The President and Fellows of Middlebury College	Variety
WRSY	101.5 FM	Marlboro	Saga Communications	Adult album alternative
WRUV	90.1 FM	Burlington	University of Vermont	Variety
WRVT	88.7 FM	Rutland	Vermont Public Co.	Public radio
WRXJ-LP	105.5 FM	Winooski	St. Francis Xavier Parish Charitable Trust	Catholic
WSKI	1240 AM	Montpelier	Galloway Communications, Inc.	Mainstream rock
WSTJ	1340 AM	St. Johnsbury	Vermont Broadcast Associates, Inc.	Adult album alternative
WSYB	1380 AM	Rutland	6 Johnson Road Licenses, Inc.	Classic hits
WTHK	100.7 FM	Wilmington	Great Eastern Radio, LLC	Classic rock
WTNN	97.5 FM	Bristol	Impact Radio, Inc.	Country
WTSA	1450 AM	Brattleboro	Community Media, LLC	Country
WTSA-FM	96.7 FM	Brattleboro	Community Media, LLC	Adult contemporary
WTWN	1100 AM	Wells River	Puffer Broadcasting, Inc.	Country
WVBA	88.9 FM	Brattleboro	Vermont Public Co.	Public radio
WVER-FM	107.5 FM	West Rutland	Vermont Public Co.	Classical
WVEW-LP	107.7 FM	Brattleboro	Vermont Earth Works, Inc.	Variety
WVLR-FM	91.5 FM	Lyndonville	Vermont Public Co.	Classical
WVMT	620 AM	Burlington	Sison Broadcasting, Inc.	News Talk Information
WVNK	91.1 FM	Manchester	Vermont Public Co.	Classical
WVPA	88.5 FM	St. Johnsbury	Vermont Public Co.	Public radio
WVPR	89.5 FM	Windsor	Vermont Public Co.	Public radio
WVPS	107.9 FM	Burlington	Vermont Public Co.	Public radio
WVTC	90.7 FM	Randolph Center	Vermont State Colleges	Variety
WVTI	106.9 FM	Brighton	Vermont Public Co.	Classical
WVTQ	95.1 FM	Sunderland	Vermont Public Co.	Classical
WVXR	102.1 FM	Randolph	Vermont Public Co.	Classical
WWFY	100.9 FM	Berlin	Great Eastern Radio, LLC	Country
WWMP	102.3 FM	Grand Isle	Lake Champlain Broadcasting Inc.	Mainstream rock
WWOD	93.9 FM	Woodstock	Great Eastern Radio, LLC	Adult album alternative
WWPV-LP	92.5 FM	Colchester	Saint Michael's College, Inc.	Adult album alternative
WXLF	95.3 FM	White River Junction	WBIN Media Co., Inc.	Country
WXLQ	89.1 FM	Bristol	St. Lawrence University/NCPR	Public radio
WXXX	95.5 FM	South Burlington	Sison Broadcasting, Inc.	Pop contemporary hit radio
WYTC-LP	89.1 FM	Hyde Park	Union High School District #18	Variety
WZKC	103.1 FM	Royalton	Educational Media Foundation	Contemporary Christian (K-Love)
WZLF	107.1 FM	Bellows Falls	WBIN Media Co., Inc.	Country
WZRT	97.1 FM	Rutland	6 Johnson Road Licenses, Inc.	Pop contemporary hit radio

== Defunct ==
In 2011, the license of WNHV was cancelled. It had been on 910 AM, White River Junction, Nassau Broadcasting III, LLC and was an All Sports station.

In 2015, the license of WAOT-LP, 98.3 FM, Derby, was cancelled. It had been licensed to the Vermont Agency of Transportation.

On May 22, 2019, the license of WIUV, 91.3 FM, Castleton, was cancelled. It had been licensed to the Board of Trustees/Vermont State Colleges, and transitioned to online-only operation following the license's cancellation.

On November 1, 2022, the license for WCAT, 1390 AM, Burlington, was cancelled. It had been airing a simulcast of mainstream-rock-formatted WWMP 103.3 FM Waterbury.

On June 21, 2023, the license for WVNR, 1340 AM, Poultney, was cancelled.

On August 23, 2024, the license for WVTX, 88.7 FM, Colchester, was cancelled.

On September 5, 2024, the license for WSNO 1450 AM, Barre, was cancelled.

On April 3, 2026, the license for WINQ 1490 AM, Brattleboro, was cancelled.
