= WHWB =

WHWB could refer to:

- WHWB (AM), a defunct radio station (970 AM) formerly licensed to Rutland, Vermont, United States
- WDVT, a radio station (94.5 FM) in Rutland, Vermont, United States known as "WHWB-FM" from 1990 to 1991
- WVTK, a radio station (92.1 FM) in Port Henry, New York, United States known as "WHWB-FM" from 1988 to 1989
- WJJR, a radio station (98.1 FM) in Rutland, Vermont, United States known as "WHWB-FM" until 1984
