= WVTQ =

- Sunderland, Vermont; United States
- Frequency: 95.1 MHz (HD Radio)

Programming
- Format: Classical
- Network: Vermont Public Classical

Ownership
- Owner: Vermont Public Co.

History
- First air date: May 1, 1991
- Former call signs: WJAN (1991–2007)
- Call sign meaning: Vermont/Mount Equinox

Technical information
- Licensing authority: FCC
- Facility ID: 54687
- Class: A
- ERP: 105 watts
- HAAT: 718.9 meters (2,358.6 ft)
- Transmitter coordinates: 43°9′56″N 73°7′11.9″W
- Translators: W295AU (106.9 MHz) Manchester, Vermont (via HD2: Vermont Public News)

Links
- Public license information: Public file; LMS
- Website: www.vermontpublic.org/vermont-public-classical

WVTQ (95.1 FM) is a radio station licensed to Sunderland, Vermont, United States. The station is owned by Vermont Public as part of its Classical network, airing classical music. WVTQ broadcasts from atop Mount Equinox in Manchester.

WVTQ has been operated by Vermont Public and its radio predecessor, Vermont Public Radio, since 2007. Previously, it was a commercial country music station under the WJAN call sign.

== History ==
In August 1990, the Federal Communications Commission (FCC) granted a construction permit for a new radio station to Ron Morlino, who beat three other applicants seeking 95.1 MHz at Sunderland after leaving his position at WEQX, the other radio station transmitting from Mount Equinox. A country music format was chosen based on community input.

WJAN began broadcasting on May 1, 1991, providing listeners in Bennington County a local alternative to WGNA-FM, a country music radio station in Albany, New York. The station aired eight hours of locally hosted music a day in morning and afternoon drive, with the remainder of the programming supplied by the Satellite Music Network. The reach of the country format expanded considerably in January 1994 when WYOY (94.5 FM) in Rutland, which had not broadcast in more than a year, became WJEN, simulcasting WJAN's programming; the combined service became known as "Cat Country", a nod to Vermont's catamounts. WJAN–WJEN grew into a cluster in 1996 when the group acquired Rutland station WJJR, adopting the name Peak Communications.

The Peak cluster was sold to Albany Broadcasting Company, a subsidiary of Pamal Broadcasting, in 1999; Morlino believed that consolidation in the radio industry obligated him to buy more stations or sell out, and he had received several unsolicited offers for the trio even though it was not on the market. While the sale awaited FCC approval, Cat Country managed to fool its competitors—WSYB and WZRT—and the Rutland Daily Herald. One afternoon in late April, Don Glaze taped himself to a lamppost while wearing a cardboard box, claiming he needed a job. The Herald published an interview in which he described his girlfriend breaking up on him after moving from Illinois. However, he did in fact have a job—as a new DJ for WJAN–WJEN.

In June 2006, Pamal sold WJAN to Vermont Public Radio for $625,000. It did so in order to meet ownership limits in the Albany market, where Pamal had acquired the silent WNYQ (105.7 FM) in Queensbury and was restoring it to service from a new transmitter site. The station initially broadcast VPR's primary program service; the next year, as VPR began expanding its all-classical program service, WJAN was switched to broadcast it and renamed WVTQ.
