= WWPV =

WWPV may refer to:

- WWPV-LP, a low-power radio station (92.5 FM) licensed to serve Colchester, Vermont, United States
- WVTX (FM), a radio station (88.7 FM) licensed to serve Colchester, Vermont, which held the call sign WWPV-FM from 1974 to 2015
- World's Wildest Police Videos
