= WHWB (AM) =

Radio station in Rutland, Vermont (1949–1993)

- Rutland, Vermont; United States
- Frequencies: 1000 kHz (1949-1988); 970 kHz (1988-1997)

Ownership
- Owner: Con Brio Broadcasting, Inc.

History
- First air date: 1949
- Last air date: September 30, 1997
- Call sign meaning: Harris, Wilson, Bates (station founders)

Technical information
- Facility ID: 13535

WHWB is a defunct AM radio station that was licensed to Rutland, Vermont. WHWB went on the air in 1949 and was on the air until late 1993. The call sign was known to have two meanings, the "H" was for Harris, the "W" was for Wilson, and the "B" was for Bates, part of the original trio that launched the radio station. Since its transmitter and studio were located across the street in a barn from the famous "Wilson's Castle" on West Proctor Road in Proctor, Vermont, the WHWB call sign was also known to mean "We Have Wilson's Barn".

WHWB was originally a true AM daytimer on 1000 AM. The schedule of sunrise to sunset operation was designed to protect the clear channel status of WCFL (now WMVP) in Chicago, Illinois. In 1988, the frequency was moved to 970 AM and was initially able to operate with low pre-sunrise and post-sunset power. From the late 1980s until signing off for good in 1993, WHWB was allowed 24-hour operation albeit with a very low nighttime power. Its 1000-watt daytime signal was about as strong as its 5,000-watt daytime AM competitor, WSYB. The nighttime signal of WHWB was able to cover most of Rutland, parts of West Rutland, and parts of Proctor with a non-directional antenna. During the mid-1980s, WHWB aired an adult contemporary music format, and at the time was an affiliate of the ABC Information Network and, since February 1985, Casey Kasem's American Top 40.

In late-March 1987, the station dropped its AC format and flipped to country music. In October 1988, the station drew national attention with a full week of all-Elvis Presley music being played as a stunt. Listener reaction ran 60/40 against swapping permanently to an all-Elvis format.

WHWB had several FM partners through the years including the original WHWB-FM 98.1 (which became WJJR in 1984). The WHWB-FM calls were used once again on 92.1 in Port Henry, New York (now WVTK), and eventually were installed on 94.5 FM (now WDVT) in Rutland. WHWB and the Rutland FM on 94.5 were linked until the demise of the operation in 1993, when WHWB went dark for good. WHWB-FM was auctioned off and returned to the airwaves as WJEN, a simulcast of WJAN 95.1 in Sunderland, Vermont. This complement of FM signals with 95.1 and 94.5 came to be known throughout central and southern Vermont and eastern New York as "Cat Country".

WHWB's license was cancelled and the call sign deleted from the FCC database on September 30, 1997. The WHWB self-supporting tower on West Proctor Road was demolished in early 1995, only the cement bases and the remnants of the transmitter shack 'doghouse' remain. The actual AM transmitter is still inside the former West Proctor Road facility, and the 94.5 facility still broadcasts from that site.
