= WVXM =

WVXM may refer to:

- WVXM (FM), a defunct radio station (89.1 FM) formerly licensed to serve Middlebury, Vermont, United States
- WOXM (FM), a radio station (90.1 FM) licensed to serve Middlebury, which held the call sign WVXM from 2014 to 2019
