= WBTN =

WBTN may refer to:

- WBTN-FM, a radio station (94.3 FM) licensed to Bennington, Vermont, United States
- WBTN (AM), a radio station (1370 AM) licensed to Bennington, Vermont, United States
