= WVLR =

WVLR may refer to:

- WVLR (TV), a television station (channel 36, virtual 48) licensed to Tazewell, Tennessee, United States
- WVLR-FM, a radio station (91.5 FM) licensed to Lyndonville, Vermont, United States
