= Equinox Mountain =

Mountain in Vermont, United States

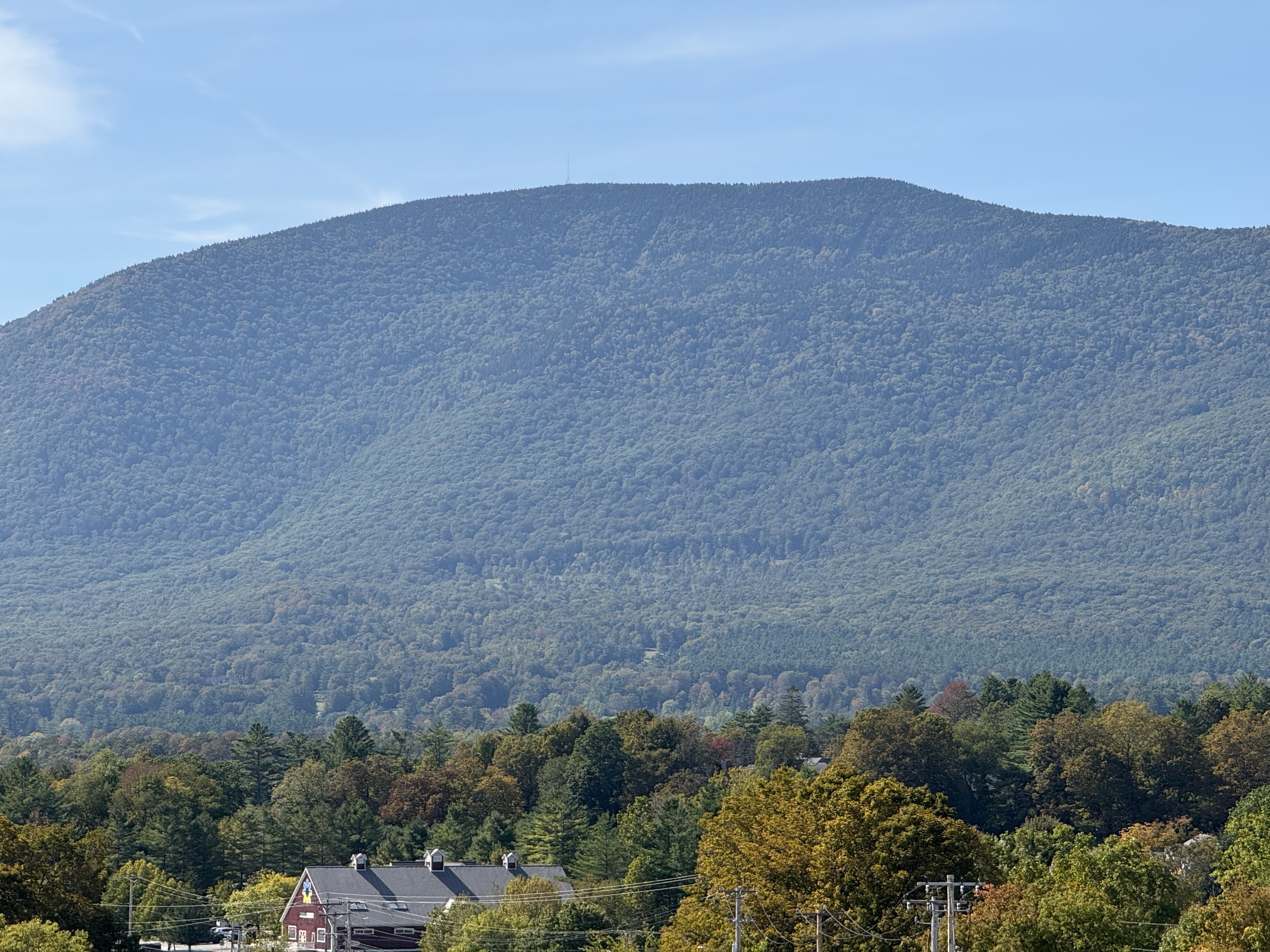
- Equinox viewed from US 7 at VT 11 and VT 30

Highest point
- Elevation: 3840+ ft (1170+ m)
- Prominence: 3,040 ft (930 m)
- Listing: New England Fifty Finest New England 100 Highest
- Coordinates: 43°09′58″N 73°07′03″W

Geography
- Location: Bennington County, Vermont, U.S.
- Parent range: Taconic Range
- Topo map: USGS Manchester

Climbing
- Easiest route: road

Equinox Mountain is the highest peak of the Taconic Range and the second-highest point in southern Vermont, after Stratton Mountain. It rises nearly 3,000 feet (914 meters) above its eastern footings in Manchester, giving Equinox the third-greatest topographic prominence among the state's mountains (after Mansfield and Killington). A summit observation building is reached via a privately operated toll road, which passes near various towers used for broadcast and other purposes.

== Geography ==
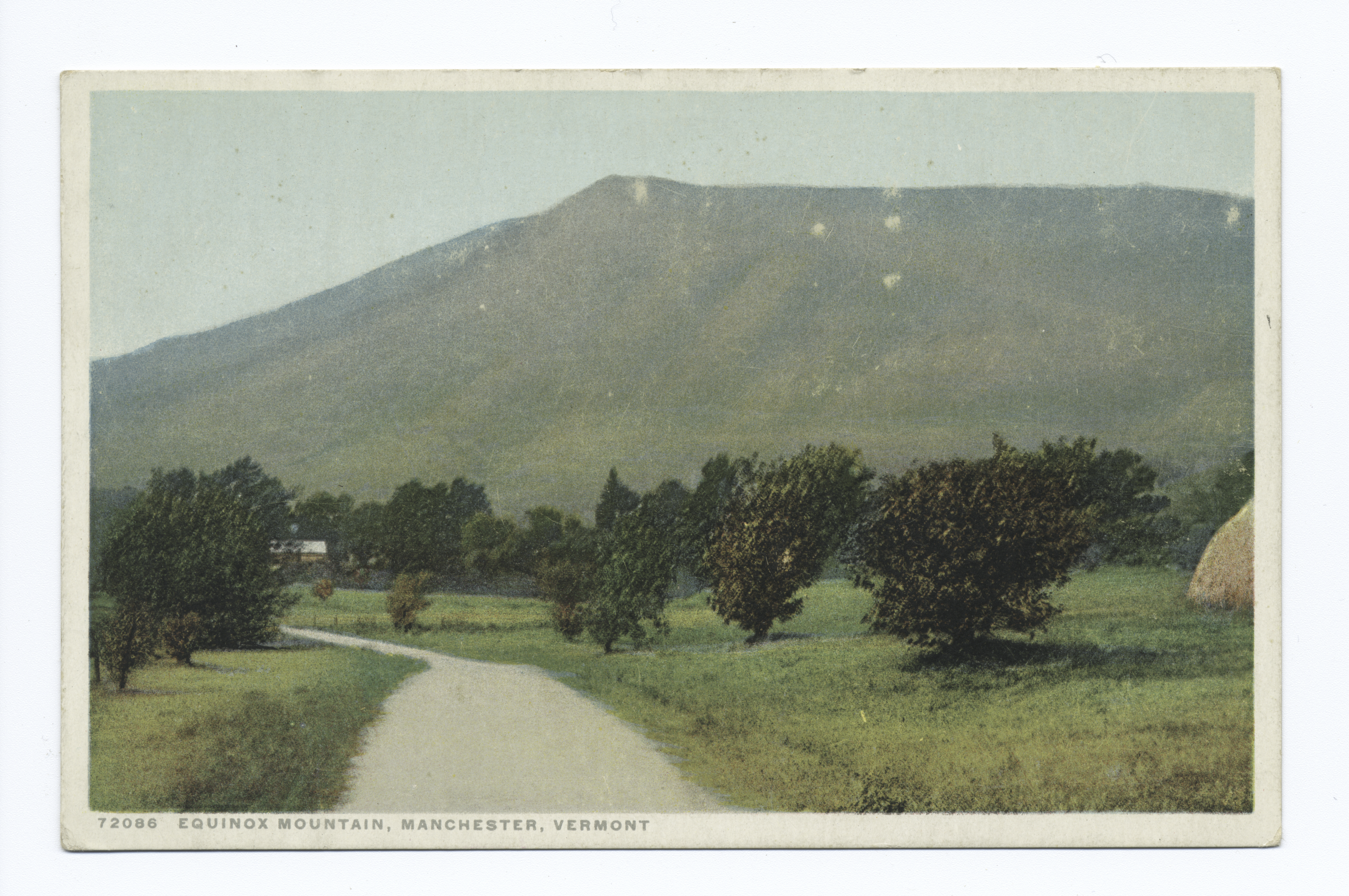
Equinox Mountain historical post card

The summit is part of a massif, or extended ridgeline described by state forest rangers as "a mountainous, un-roaded area dominated by Mt. Equinox, Red Mountain, Mother Myrick and Bear Mountain." Separately, a land trust described much of this same area as the "Equinox Highlands." Yet only parts of these uplands are formally conserved either as public property or privately operated land trusts.

Equinox Mountain's immediate eastern flanks are incised by Skinner Hollow and Cook Hollow; its western flanks by Mears Hollow, Corbett Hollow and Hamilton Hollow. Among these small and mostly very steep valleys, all but Hamilton Hollow are undeveloped, although a trail skirts Cook Hollow. The eastern slopes drain toward the Batten Kill River. The western slopes drain toward the Green River, a Batten Kill tributary that forms the 10-mile, dead-end mountain valley occupied by Sandgate, Vermont and headed by Mother Myrick Mountain.

== Historical and present development ==
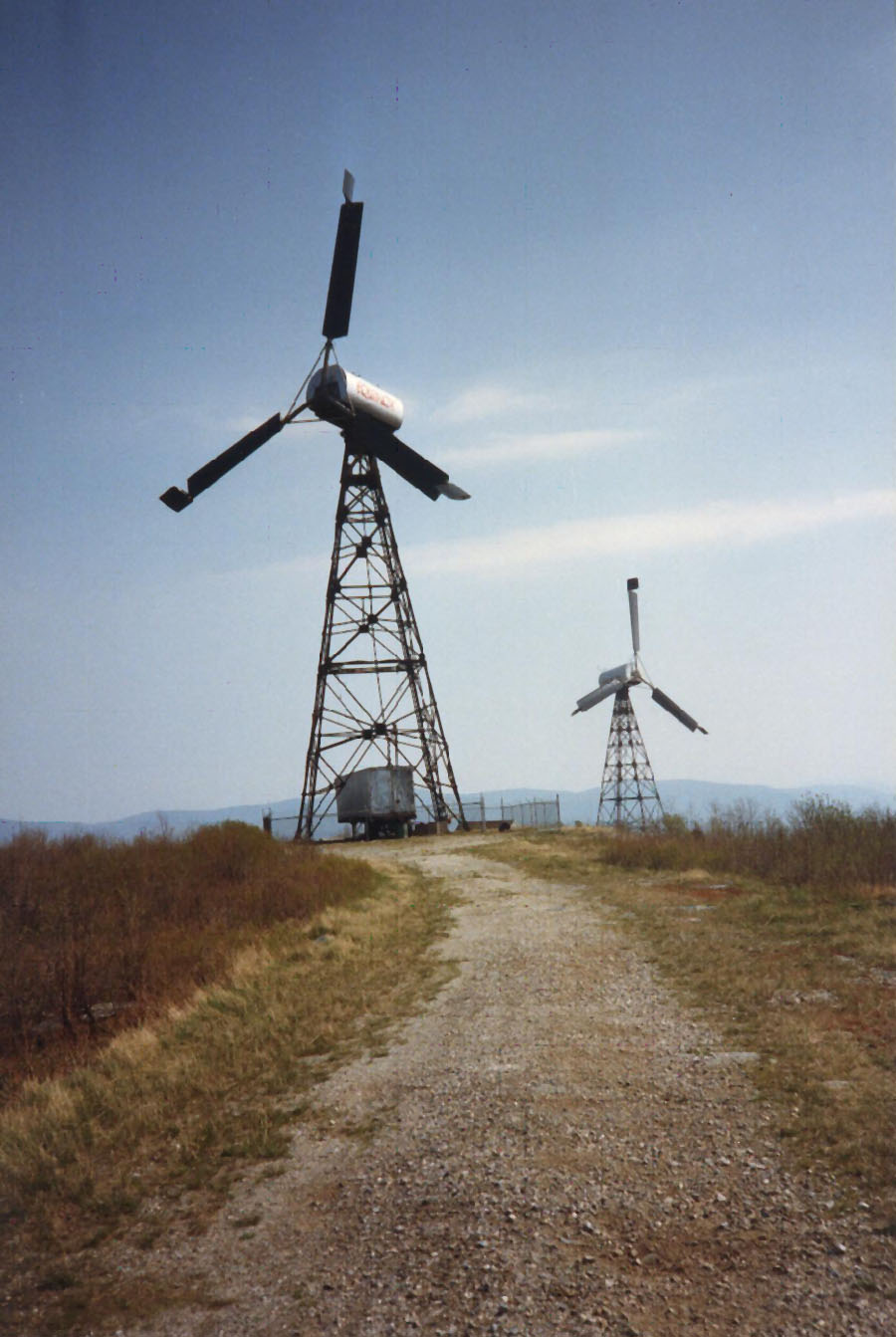
WTG turbines on Little Equinox in 1985

During the 1860s a Manchester group built a 4-mile road leading south from near the height of Beartown Gap Road nearly to Equinox's summit. As of a 1949 report, this former road, which reached only to Lookout Rock, had "long fallen into disuse but its route is readily discernable."

Using a route on a separate part of the mountain, the current 5.2-mile toll road leads north to the summit and was completed in 1947 by Joseph George Davidson, a retired Union Carbide Corp. executive, who also built a summit hotel there (opened 1950). Davidson had acquired about 7,000 acres mostly on Equinox's western slopes, with tentative plans to develop a commercial ski area centered on upper Hamilton Hollow. But as of his death in 1969, Davidson had completed transfer of all his Equinox property to an especially austere Catholic monastic order called the Carthusians, and paid for building their Charterhouse of the Transfiguration monastery (opened 1970) in the upper hollow at an elevation of 2,100 feet.

The summit hotel closed in the 1990s and soon became derelict. It was demolished in 2011 to make way for a "viewing center" operated by the monastery, which obtained 2019 gross receipts of $327,502 from its toll road and related gift shop, according to a tax filing.

Prospective developments on the eastern slopes of Equinox included a 1930s federal work agency's unsuccessful proposal to cut ski trails. Development possibilities on a larger scale emerged with the 1962 sale of Manchester's Equinox House hotel and its adjoining 1,500 acres of mountainside, after which a succession of corporate owners repeatedly made ambitious proposals for a commercial ski area there. But a 1974 bankruptcy pushed all such ideas into abeyance and Equinox House stood empty during the subsequent decade. (See also Equinox House Historic District.)

Radio station WEQX's tower is located on the mountain, hence the callsign of the station. A small, abandoned FAA Air Traffic Control facility can be seen near the summit. The site is now used for two-way communications by the Vermont State Police, and for another FM radio station to transmit from the mountain. Vermont Public Radio's WVTQ. Additional land mobile radio tenants are co-sited and all are charged rent by the site’s owner.

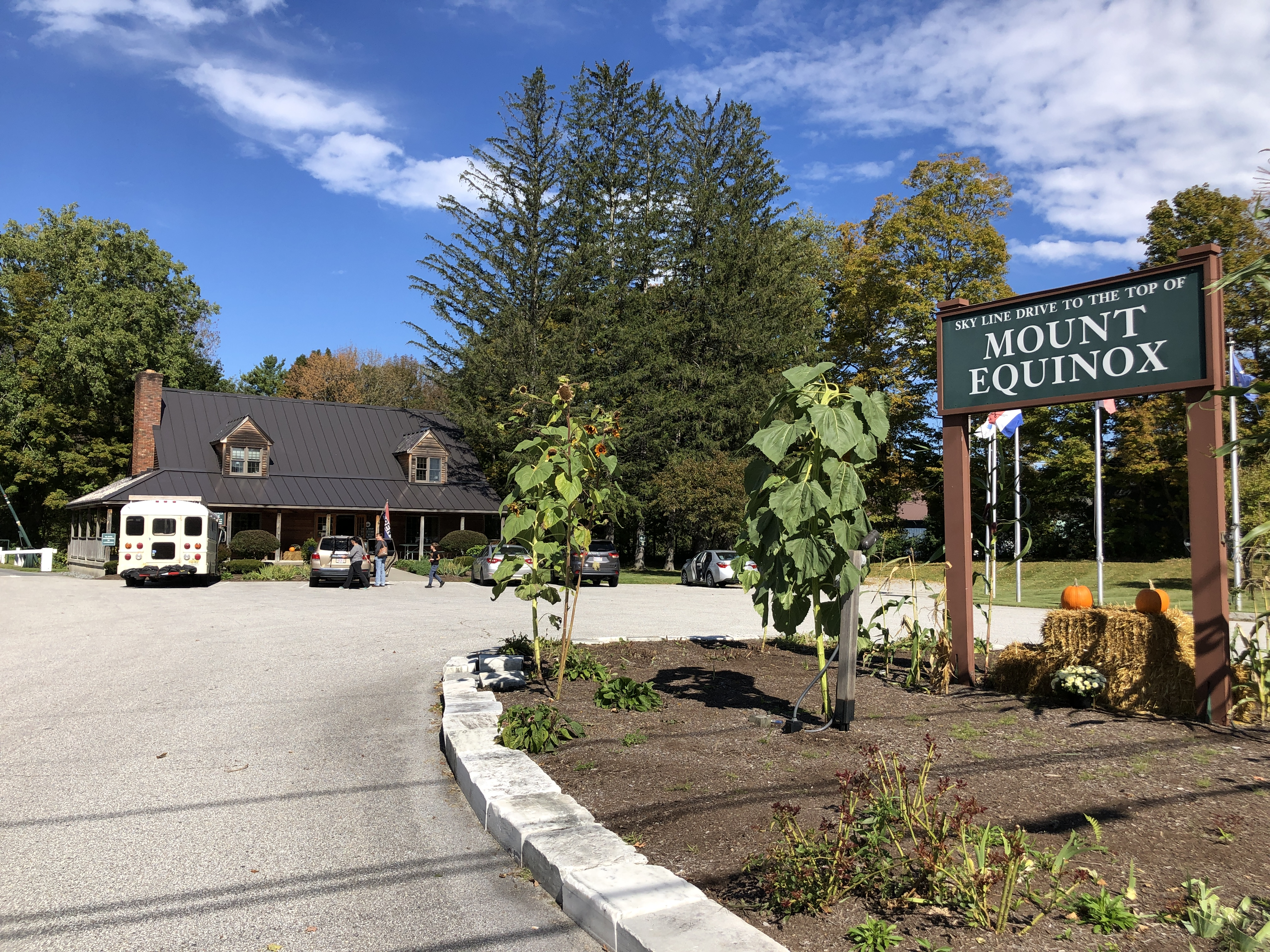
Entrance station for the toll road leading to the summit

== Automobile races ==
"The Mount Equinox Annual Hillclimb" on the toll road began in 1950, when the winner was William F. Milliken Jr. During the 1960s, a still-standing course record was set at "just over four minutes" and participants have exceeded 100 miles per hour on stretches of the course. Entries for this hillclimbing race since 1973 have been limited to "vintage racing cars." In that year, the Vintage Sports Car Club of America took over sponsorship of the event from the Sports Car Club of America. The 5.2-mile (8.7 km) course gains nearly 3,000 feet. In comparison, the 7.4-mile (11.9 km) Mount Washington Hillclimb Auto Race in New Hampshire gains 4,656 feet.

== Wind farming ==
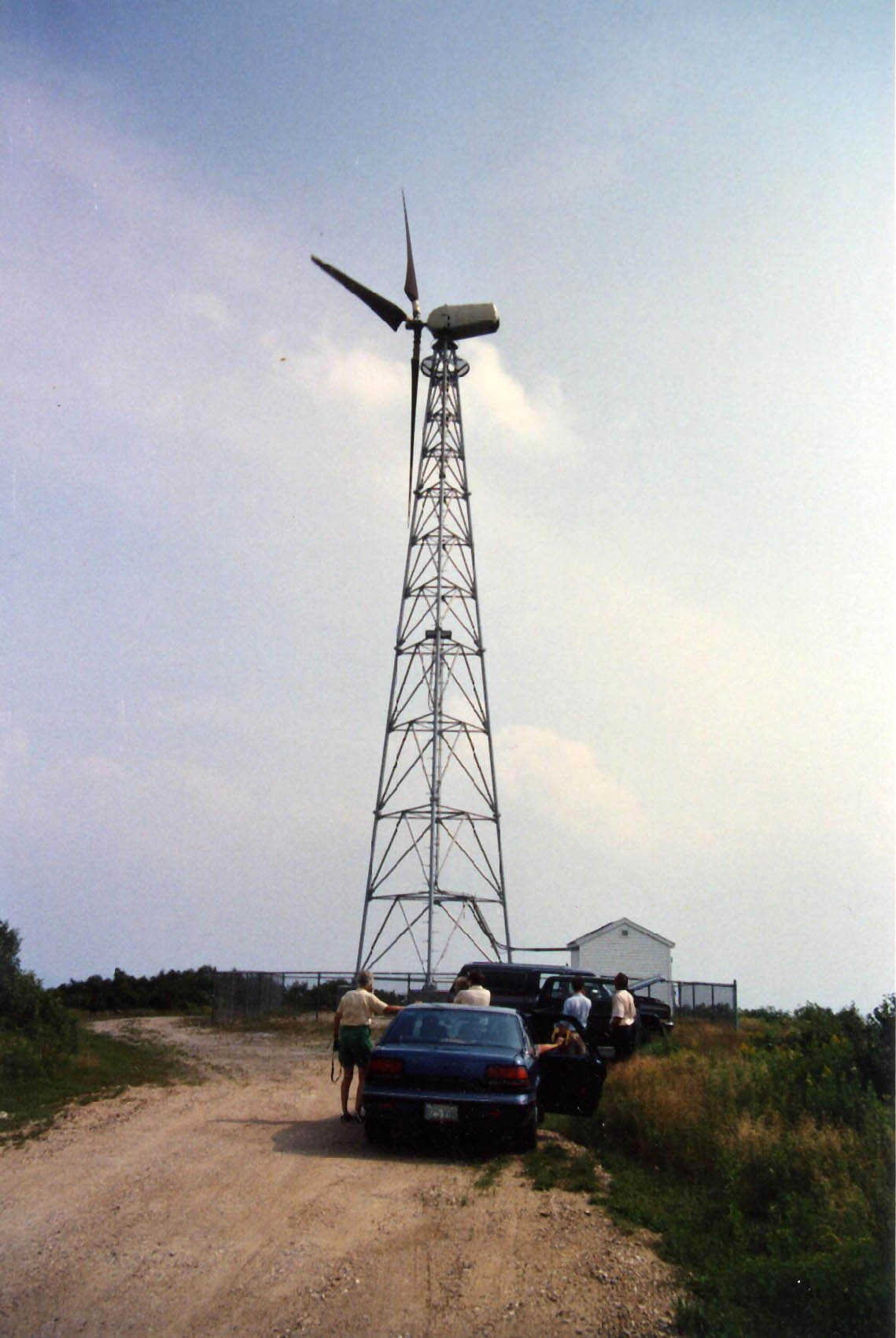
Second wind farm on Little Equinox (1990–94)

Adjacent to the larger Equinox Mountains is Little Equinox, where two wind farms have previously operated. One wind turbine was installed in 1981 and three more in 1982, making Little Equinox Mountain the site of one of the first wind farms in the United States. These turbines, an early-generation design by WTG Systems of Buffalo, New York, were mounted on 80-foot (24 m) truss towers and had a nominal peak output of 350 kW. The turbines, however, were plagued with mechanical issues, and by the mid-1980s all four were out of service, standing idle on the mountain from 1985 through 1989.

Green Mountain Power began operating the site in 1988, erecting a wind measurement tower and removing the four old turbines. It installed two U.S. Windpower 100 kW turbines in 1990, which ran for four years making electricity. Green Mountain Power removed its turbines and measurement tower in 1994. The company now owns the Searsburg Wind Farm in Searsburg, Vermont.

Endless Energy Corporation, a wind farm development company based in Maine, has expressed interest in the site for a modern wind farm. They have conducted wind measurements as well as environmental studies of Little Equinox Mountain. To build a wind farm in Vermont, the developer needs to go through the Public Service Board's Section 248 application process.

== Summit panorama ==
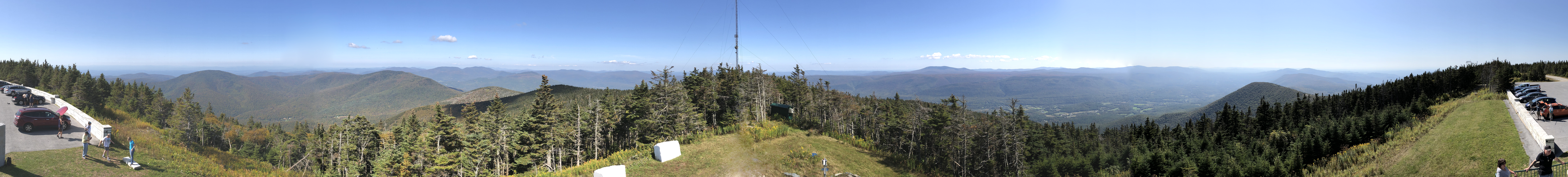
360-degree stitched panorama from the top of Mount Equinox

== See also ==
- List of mountains in Vermont
