= WJAN =

WJAN may refer to:

- WJAN-CD, a low-power television station (channel 33, virtual 41) licensed to serve Miami, Florida, United States
- WVTQ, a radio station (95.1 FM) licensed to serve Sunderland, Vermont, United States, which held the call sign WJAN from 1990 to 2007
- WDLI-TV, a television station (channel 17) licensed to serve Canton, Ohio, United States, which held the call sign WJAN-TV until 1983
