= Charterhouse of the Transfiguration =

Carthusian monastery in Vermont, US

Coordinates: 43°09′32″N 73°08′55″W

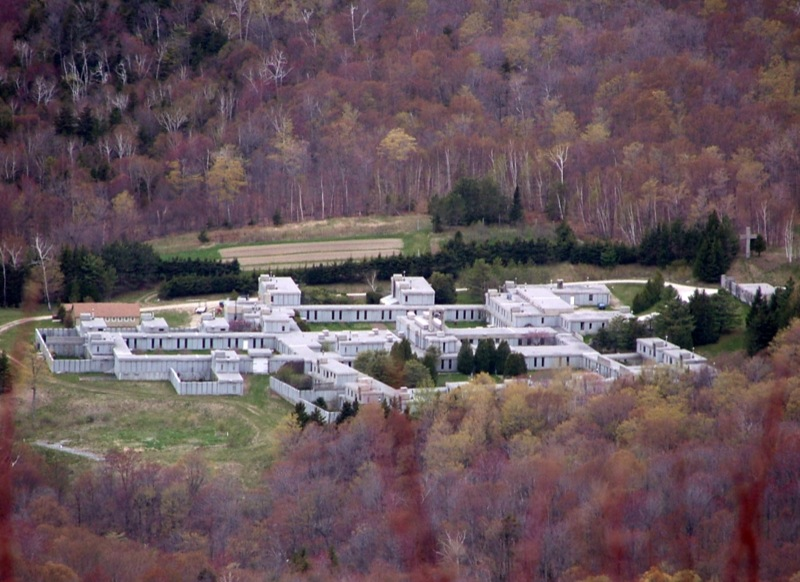
The charterhouse in 2006

The Charterhouse of the Transfiguration is the only Carthusian monastery in North America, located on Mt. Equinox, in Sandgate, Vermont. It was founded in 1960 under the initiative of Fr. Thomas Verner Moore and completed in 1970. It superseded the earlier monastery at Sky Farm and Grace Farm (Charterhouse of Our Lady of Bethlehem), near Whitingham, Vermont, which Fr. Thomas had established in 1950.

The 7,000-acre (28 km^{2}) property was donated by Joseph George Davidson, a retired Union Carbide Corporation executive.

The charterhouse was designed by architect Victor Christ-Janer & Associates of New Canaan, Connecticut, and fabricated of Vermont granite blocks.
