= Vermont Edition =

Vermont radio daily news

Vermont Edition is a daily news and information program on Vermont Public Radio. It airs weekdays at 12 P.M. and runs for one hour. It is considered to be the flagship daily newsmagazine of VPR.

== History ==
Vermont Edition first aired on VPR in 2005 as a once per week newsmagazine. In 2007, it began airing five days a week.

The former host is Jane Lindholm. She left the host chair in early 2021. She was replaced by Connor Cyrus and Mikaela Lefrak. Cyrus left in 2023.
