= Joseph George Davidson =

American chemist and inventor

Dr Joseph George Davidson FRSE (February 7, 1892 – October 9, 1969) was an American chemist and inventor.

== Life ==
Davidson was born February 7, 1892, in New York City, a son of John Wellington and Theresa (Gahan) Davidson. The family moved to California when he was an infant. He received his bachelor of arts degree in chemistry in 1911 from the University of Southern California, and subsequently a master of arts in chemistry in 1912. He subsequently received a doctorate (PhD) in chemistry from Columbia University in 1918.

During World War I he was commissioned in the US Army as a 2nd Lieutenant in the Chemical Warfare Service (largely connected with the development of mustard gas), but with his role being connected more closely to mines, in the Bureau of Mines in Pittsburg. During World War II, he headed Union Carbide's subcontract to carry out the gaseous diffusion separation of uranium in Oak Ridge, Tennessee, which produced the fissile material for the first atomic bomb.

In 1949 he was elected an Honorary Fellow of the Royal Society of Edinburgh. He was the recipient of the 1955 Chemical Industry Medal.

He rose to the rank of vice president of the Union Carbide Corporation, and (from 1949) president and then board chairman of Union Carbide's Chemicals Company Division. He held twenty-eight patents, the best known being Bakelite (named for its inventor, Leo Baekeland). He also held patents on lacquers, antiknock fuels, pickling inhibitors, and laminated safety glass.

In his retirement, in the 1960s, he purchased about 11 square miles (28 km^{2}) of Mt. Equinox, outside Arlington, Vermont. He would later donate this land to the Carthusians who built the Charterhouse of the Transfiguration on the property.

He died at Putnam Memorial Hospital in Bennington, Vermont on October 9, 1969.

== See also ==
- Charterhouse of the Transfiguration
