= Jane Lindholm =

American radio host

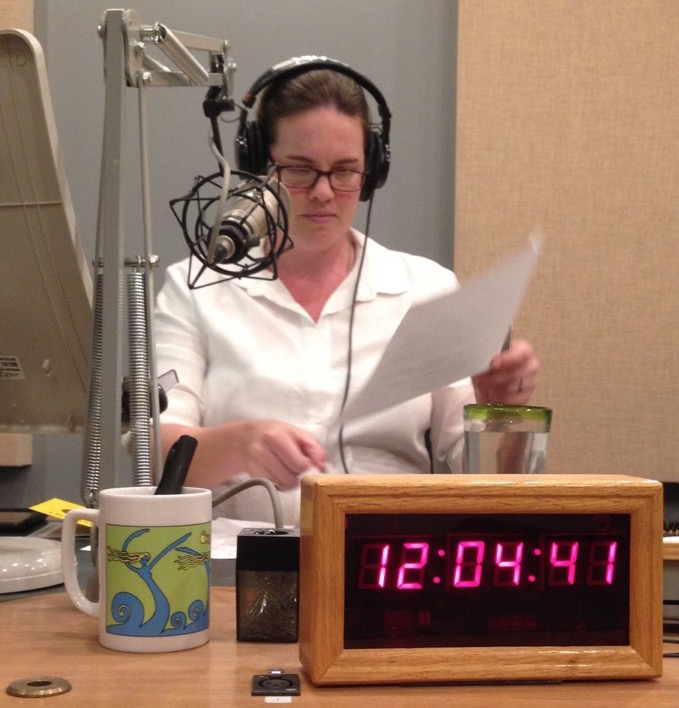
- Jane Lindholm in VPR's studios during a recording of Vermont Edition.
- Presenting career
- Show: Vermont Edition
- Stations: WVPS, VPR
- Time slot: 12:00 - 1:00 p.m. Monday-Friday
- Country: U.S.
- Previous show: Marketplace
- Website: The Common Wanderer

Jane Lindholm is the host for the Vermont Public Radio (VPR) newsmagazine Vermont Edition, producer and host of But Why: A Podcast For Curious Kids, and a photojournalist. She lives in Monkton, Vermont.

Lindholm attended the Brooks School and Harvard University where she got a BA in Anthropology. While at college she started writing and editing for Let’s Go Travel Guides. After college, she worked at National Public Radio in Washington DC before moving to Los Angeles where she worked as the director/producer for Marketplace. She moved to Vermont in 2007 where she expanded Vermont Edition from a weekly to a daily program. During the aftermath of Hurricane Irene Vermont Edition expanded their live coverage to three to four hours per day to provide information to people stranded by the storm.

== Recognition ==
Lindholm won a Public Radio News Directors Inc. (PRNDI) Best Use Of Sound award in 2011 for her story on hand-milking cows. Vermont Edition won a PRNDI award in 2012 for Lindholm's story on tiny houses. In 2015, Lindholm was voted best Local Radio Host, and her show, Vermont Edition was voted Best Talk Radio Show, in Burlington newspaper Seven Days' annual Daysies awards.
