= Victor Christ-Janer =

American architect

Victor F. Christ-Janer (March 27, 1915 – March 24, 2008) was an American architect who along with the world-renowned Harvard Five helped define the Modernist architectural movement in New Canaan, Connecticut. He was also an educator, artist, and inventor.

== Biography ==
Victor Christ-Janer was born in Elysian, Minnesota on March 27, 1915 and raised in nearby Waterville. Christ-Janer trained in liberal arts, sculpting, painting, and architecture at St. Olaf College from 1933 to 1935. From 1937 to 1939, he served along with his friend, Adolf Dehn (water colorist, lithographer) as director of a summer art school at Stephens College. From 1941 to 1942, he was the chief graphic designer for Nelson Rockefeller's Office of the Coordinator of Inter-American Affairs. He continued his education at Yale University, where he received his Bachelor of Fine Arts with honors in 1940. His studies were interrupted when he served in World War II. Christ-Janer was a pacifist who applied for and secured a conscientious objector status after being drafted in November 1941. In December 1942, he was inducted into the United States Army as a volunteer in a non-combatant position where he served in the European theater as a camouflage artist and also in intelligence for the Army’s Department of Engineers and Military Intelligence. He was honorably discharged as a Corporal in 1946. His wartime experiences made a deep and lasting impression on him and the theme of non-violence followed him throughout his life. Never shy of making bold statements, he kept a dozen or so wartime photos in his desk at his architectural firm. He had obtained photos of a German concentration camp right after it had been liberated by the Allies. Shocking as they were, he referred to them often as teaching examples of the horrors of war, of the Holocaust, and to underscore the veracity of his strong philosophical and ethical beliefs. In this regard, he swore off buying German cars and anecdotally, he was said to have gently chided his accountant into selling his Mercedes. After the war, Christ-Janer returned to Yale University where he received his Bachelor of Architecture in 1947. He was employed as an associate of Nemeny and Geller from 1946 to 1948. He was by employed by Nelson Rockefeller as a designer for the International Basic Economy Corporation (IBEC), from 1948 to 1949.

After completing his college education, Christ-Janer designed and built his home in New Canaan, Connecticut in 1949 where he lived until his death in 2008. The residence was sold in September 2010 and eventually demolished in early 2013 after a campaign by family, colleagues and preservationists failed in efforts to preserve the home. In 1955, he founded the Victor Christ-Janer and Associates architectural firm on Elm Street in New Canaan. Outgrowing the office space on Elm Street in the mid-1960s, the firm eventually moved to 10 Forest Street in New Canaan. Christ-Janer's love of modern art was expressed when he opened an intimate gallery within the office with various work including Andy Warhol, Claes Oldenburg, Jasper Johns and Roy Lichtenstein. Here, the firm flourished, with around 26 draftsmen when at its height. Many of the young architects who started with this firm went on to open successful firms of their own.

Christ-Janer's occupation was not restricted to design alone. He also taught the course: The Master's degree in General Design at Columbia University, from 1963 to 1977. From 1963-70, Christ-Janer was a guest lecturer participating in the Danforth Visiting Lecturers Project, sponsored jointly by the Danforth Foundation and the Association of American Colleges. Christ-Janer's lectures included "Aesthetics, Space and Theology," "Beyond Architecture," and "Irrationality and the Contemporary Consciousness." At one point in the mid-1970s, Christ-Janer taught a version of this class to an open classroom of New Canaan high school students. Later in his career, Christ-Janer spent considerable time developing building materials resistant to natural calamities such as earthquakes, cyclones, and hurricanes.

== Notable works ==
- The Irwin House, New Canaan, Connecticut, 1953
- The Daine House, New Canaan, Connecticut, 1956
- Lake Erie College, Painesville, Ohio
- Lewisboro Village, New York
- Meinrad Abbey for the United Christ Church, Connecticut
- Saint Mary’s Abbey, Morristown, New Jersey
- Unitarian Universalist Church, Rochester, Minnesota
- Charterhouse of the Transfiguration, Arlington, Vermont
- Walter Stewarts Market, New Canaan, Connecticut, 1957
- The Willows Medical Offices, Westport, Connecticut
- West Norwalk Congregational Church, West Norwalk, Connecticut
- Unitarian Universalist Fellowship of Northern Westchester, Mt. Kisco, New York
- Tenth Church of Christ Science, New York, New York
- McGaw Chapel, The College of Wooster, Wooster, Ohio, 1971
- YWCA, Greenwich, Connecticut, 1970

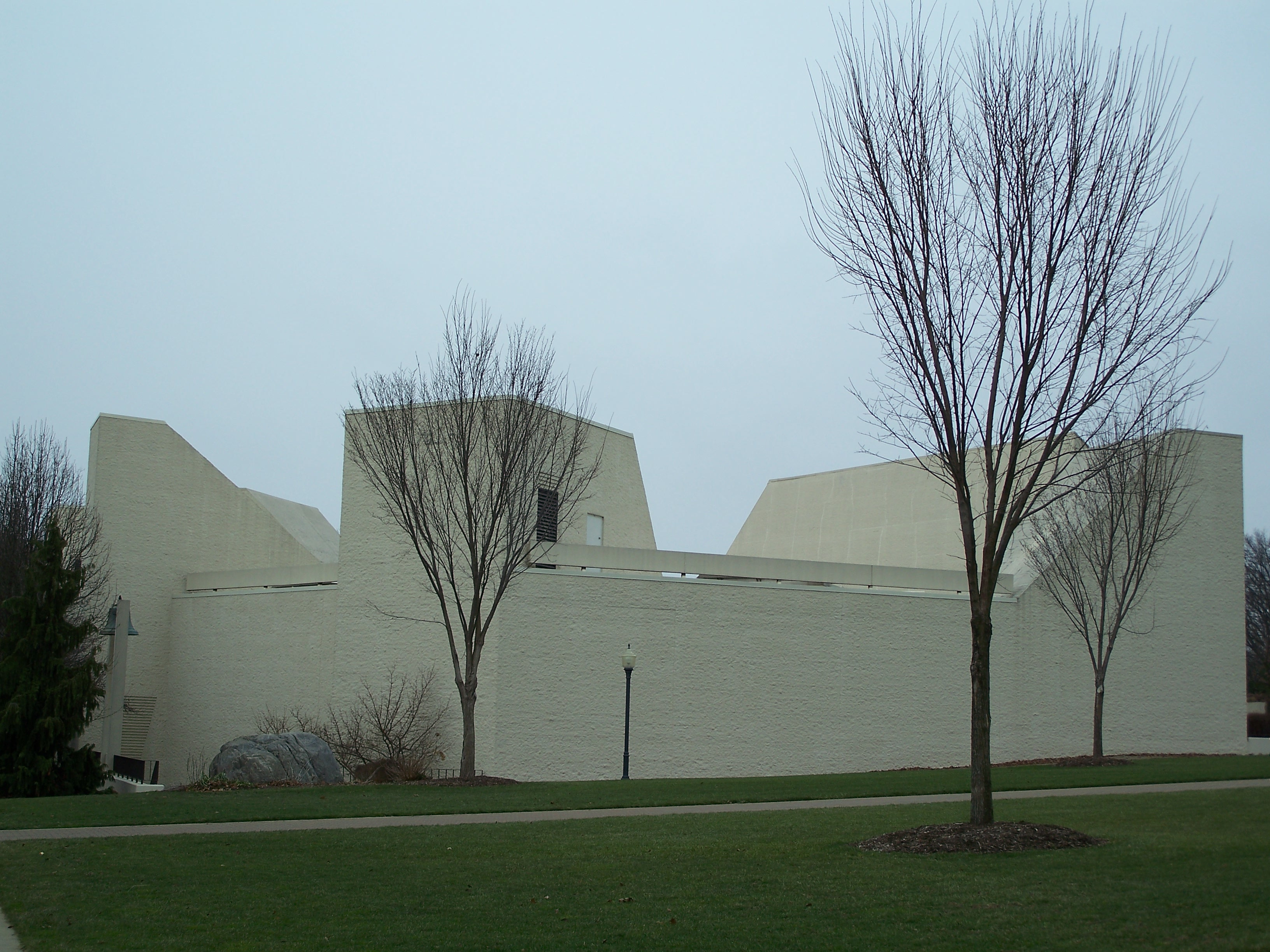
McGaw Chapel
