= WVXR =

Radio station licensed to serve Randolph, Vermont

- Randolph, Vermont; United States
- Frequency: 102.1 MHz
- Branding: Vermont Public Classical

Programming
- Format: Classical and opera
- Network: Vermont Public Classical
- Affiliations: American Public Media; National Public Radio; Public Radio Exchange

Ownership
- Owner: Vermont Public; (Vermont Public Co.)

History
- First air date: October 25, 1982 (as WCVR-FM)
- Former call signs: WCVR-FM (1982–2010)
- Former frequencies: 102.3 MHz (1982–1990s)
- Call sign meaning: see WOXR; Vermont

Technical information
- Licensing authority: FCC
- Facility ID: 63473
- Class: C3
- ERP: 11,000 watts
- HAAT: 133 meters (436 feet)
- Transmitter coordinates: 43°57′20.2″N 72°36′13.9″W

Links
- Public license information: Public file; LMS
- Webcast: Listen live
- Website: Vermont Public Classical

WVXR (102.1 FM) is a radio station licensed to serve Randolph, Vermont. The station is owned by Vermont Public. It is a classical music station, serving as the central Vermont outlet for Vermont Public Classical.

== History ==
The station signed on October 25, 1982 as WCVR-FM. Originally owned by Stokes Communications and broadcasting at 102.3, the station carried a country music format, at times simulcast on sister AM station WCVR/WWWT. It moved to 102.1 in the early 1990s.

Stokes sold WCVR-FM and WWWT to Excalibur Media in 1999; Excalibur, in turn, was sold to Clear Channel Communications the following year. Clear Channel dropped the country format on January 23, 2003, replacing it with a simulcast of classic rock station WCPV from the Champlain Valley.

In January 2008, Clear Channel agreed to sell its Vermont stations to Vox Communications as part of Clear Channel's plan to divest itself of most of its smaller market radio stations. The sale was completed on July 25, 2008. Vox soon concluded that it had no interest in retaining WCVR-FM and what had become WTSJ, and reached a deal to sell the stations to Great Eastern Radio in September 2008. Great Eastern replaced the WCPV simulcast with a separate classic rock format. However, it never closed on the deal, and a year later Vox retook the station.

In March 2010, another deal to sell WCVR-FM, this time to Vermont Public Radio (VPR), was reached; Vox then shut the station down on April 1 for financial reasons. VPR returned the station to the air July 30 as WVXR, carrying the VPR Classical service.
