= WJEN =

Radio station in Killington–Rutland, Vermont

- Killington, Vermont; United States
- Broadcast area: Rutland; Southern Vermont
- Frequency: 105.3 MHz
- Branding: 105.3 Cat Country

Programming
- Format: Country
- Affiliations: Westwood One

Ownership
- Owner: Pamal Broadcasting; (6 Johnson Road Licenses, Inc.)
- Sister stations: WDVT; WJJR; WSYB; WZRT

History
- First air date: August 4, 1993
- Former call signs: WEBK (1993–2008)

Technical information
- Licensing authority: FCC
- Facility ID: 34609
- Class: C2
- ERP: 1,250 watts
- HAAT: 683 meters (2,241 ft)
- Transmitter coordinates: 43°38′22.2″N 72°50′10.3″W

Links
- Public license information: Public file; LMS
- Webcast: Listen live
- Website: www.catcountryvermont.com

WJEN (105.3 FM) is a commercial radio station licensed to Killington, Vermont, and broadcasting to Rutland and Southern Vermont. The station is owned by Pamal Broadcasting and airs a country music radio format known as "105.3 Cat Country". The studios and offices are on Dorr Drive in Rutland.

While WJEN has an effective radiated power (ERP) of only 1,250 watts, its height above average terrain (HAAT) is 683 meters (2,241 ft). That gives it a large coverage area as a Class C2 station. The transmitter is on Pico Mountain in Killington, Vermont.

== History ==
=== K105 Rock ===
While under construction, the station took the call sign WEBK, beginning on December 17, 1992. On August 4, 1993, the station first signed on the air. "K105", as it was known, had a mainstream rock format and was owned by Killington Broadcasting.

By 1998, "K105" had been largely dropped in favor of "The Mountain", but the format stayed the same. In January 2001, Pamal Broadcasting agreed to pay Killington Broadcasting $1.65 million for the station.

=== "The Peak" ===
On October 31, 2003, the station flipped to "105.3 The Peak; World Class Rock" a more structured adult album alternative (AAA) format, although the music did lean more alternative than most AAA stations. Disc jockeys Spider Glenn and Kerry Chambers were fired due to the format change. Mitch was the only DJ to survive the house-cleaning. He moved to afternoons and Joan Holliday was brought aboard to fill the mid-day position. Eventually, Poptart Dave was hired to helm the morning show.

In April 2005, Poptart Dave left the station and Mitch was moved to mornings. James was hired and took over afternoons in May 2005. Mitch left in June 2006 and James shifted to mornings. Tim Taylor, featured on weekends, handled the afternoon slot. In November 2006, Uncle Dave was hired as morning show host and James went back to afternoons.

WEBK featured a wide variety of music. Its core artists included The Grateful Dead, Phish, U2, Dave Matthews Band, The Rolling Stones, The Beatles, R.E.M., Bob Marley, Nirvana, The Allman Brothers Band, Led Zeppelin, Pearl Jam and The Red Hot Chili Peppers. It also took pride in local artists, frequently spinning tracks from The Samples, Grace Potter and the Nocturnals, Rick Redington and The Chad Hollister Band, among others.

=== "Cat Country" ===
At 3:00 p.m. on Friday, February 8, 2008, the adult album alternative format and call letters WEBK were dropped. Pamal Broadcasting decided to replace WEBK with WJEN's country music format and call letters, formerly on 94.5 FM. The station on 94.5 took the call letters WDVT and become a classic hits outlet called "The Drive" after two weeks of simulcasting the new "Cat Country".

The last song WEBK played was The Rolling Stones' "When The Whip Comes Down".
