= Sandgate, Vermont =

- Town
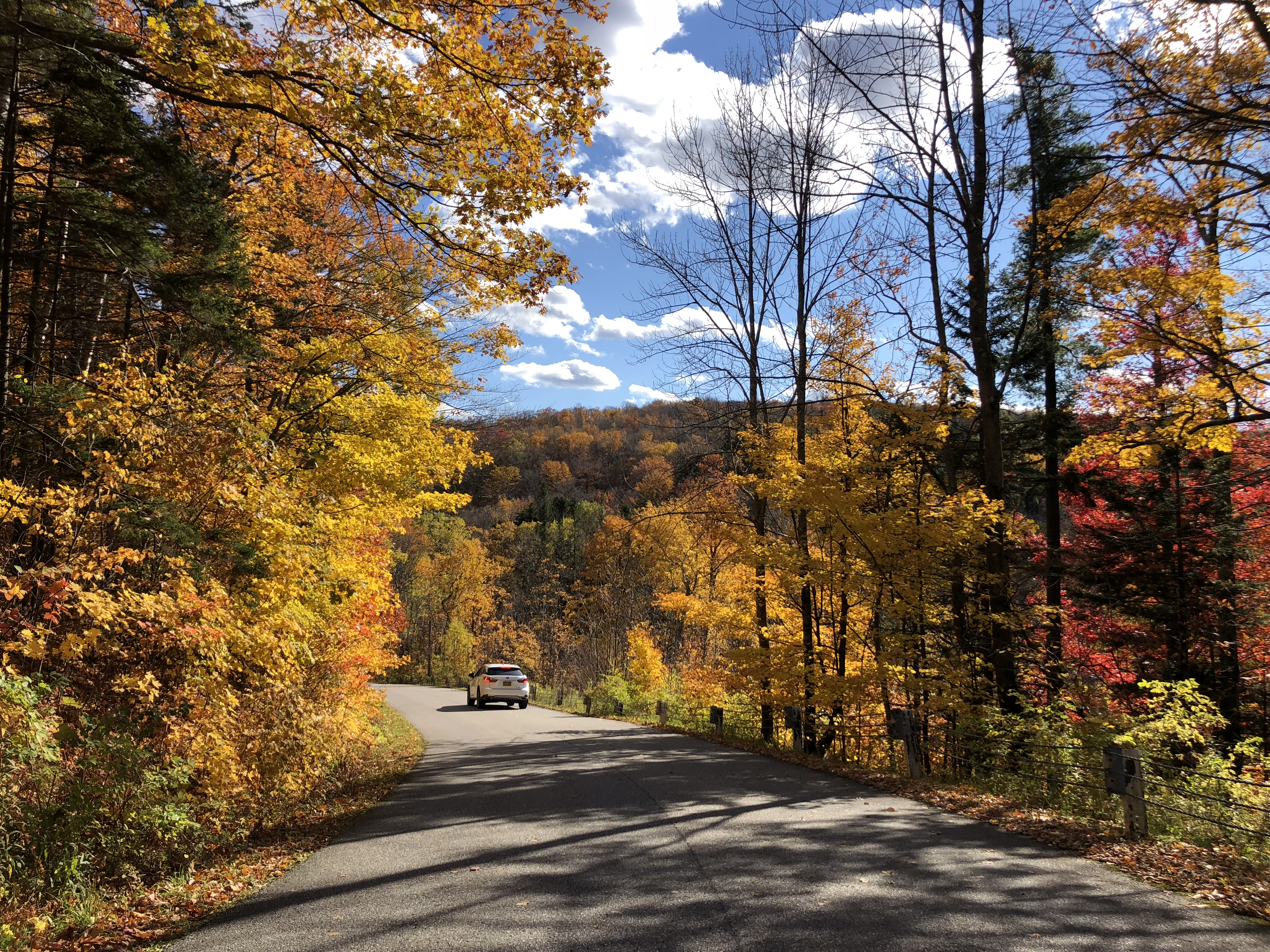
- View south along Sky Line Drive at about 2100 feet above sea level on Equinox Mountain in Sandgate, Bennington County, Vermont

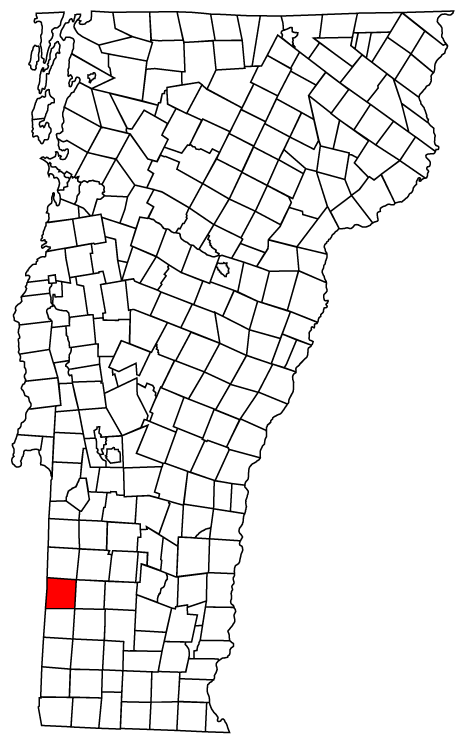
- Sandgate, Vermont
- Coordinates: 43°08′53″N 73°13′47″W
- Country: United States
- State: Vermont
- County: Bennington
- Communities: Sandgate; West Sandgate

Area
  - Total: 42.2 sq mi (109.3 km^{2})
  - Land: 42.1 sq mi (109.1 km^{2})
  - Water: 0.077 sq mi (0.2 km^{2})
- Elevation: 1,726 ft (526 m)

Population (2020)
  - Total: 387
  - Density: 9.1/sq mi (3.5/km^{2})
- Time zone: UTC-5 (Eastern (EST))
  - Summer (DST): UTC-4 (EDT)
- ZIP code: 05250
- Area code: 802
- FIPS code: 50-62875
- GNIS feature ID: 1462201
- Website: sandgatevermont.org

Sandgate is a town in Bennington County, Vermont, United States. The population was 387 at the 2020 census.

== Geography ==
Sandgate is located in northwestern Bennington County and is entirely within the Taconic Mountains. It is bordered to the north by the town of Rupert, to the east by Manchester, to the south by Arlington, and to the west by the town of Salem in Washington County, New York. Bear Mountain, with a summit of 3,301 feet (1,006 m), is the highest point, located in the northern part of the town. The eastern part of town includes the lower slopes of Equinox Mountain, which has its summit in neighboring Manchester.

According to the United States Census Bureau, the town has a total area of 42.2 square miles (109.3 km^{2}), of which 42.1 square miles (109.1 km^{2}) is land and 0.08 square miles (0.2 km^{2}), or 0.16%, is water. The entire town is part of the watershed of the Batten Kill, a tributary of the Hudson River in New York.

== Demographics ==
Historical population
Census	Pop.	Note	%±
1790	773		—
1800	1,020		32.0%
1810	1,187		16.4%
1820	1,185		−0.2%
1830	933		−21.3%
1840	777		−16.7%
1850	850		9.4%
1860	805		−5.3%
1870	705		−12.4%
1880	681		−3.4%
1890	587		−13.8%
1900	482		−17.9%
1910	401		−16.8%
1920	283		−29.4%
1930	189		−33.2%
1940	187		−1.1%
1950	158		−15.5%
1960	93		−41.1%
1970	127		36.6%
1980	234		84.3%
1990	278		18.8%
2000	353		27.0%
2010	405		14.7%
2020	387		−4.4%
U.S. Decennial Census

As of the census of 2000, there were 353 people, 149 households, and 98 families residing in the town. The population density was 8.4 people per square mile (3.2/km^{2}). There were 268 housing units at an average density of 6.4 per square mile (2.5/km^{2}). The racial makeup of the town was 97.45% White, 0.85% Black, 0.85% Asian, and 0.85% from two or more races. Hispanic of any race were 0.28% of the population.

There were 149 households, out of which 23.5% had children under the age of 18 living with them, 55.7% were married couples living together, 6.7% had a female householder with no husband present, and 34.2% were non-families. 26.8% of all households were made up of individuals, and 8.1% had someone living alone who was 65 years of age or older. The average household size was 2.37 and the average family size was 2.83.

In the town, the age distribution of the population shows 21.5% under the age of 18, 3.7% from 18 to 24, 23.2% from 25 to 44, 34.3% from 45 to 64, and 17.3% who were 65 years of age or older. The median age was 46 years. For every 100 females, there were 115.2 males. For every 100 females age 18 and over, there were 121.6 males.

The median income for a household in the town was $41,250, and the median income for a family was $46,944. Males had a median income of $31,042 versus $24,191 for females. The per capita income for the town was $22,096. About 4.7% of families and 12.7% of the population were below the poverty line, including 20.0% of those under age 18 and 9.9% of those age 65 or over.

== Notable people ==
- Silas Anderson, 7th Chief Justice of California
- Ormsby B. Thomas, US congressman from Wisconsin
