= WVTX (FM) =

Vermont Public Radio station in Colchester, Vermont

- Colchester, Vermont; United States
- Broadcast area: Greater Burlington, Vermont
- Frequency: 88.7 MHz
- Branding: Vermont Public Classical

Programming
- Format: Classical music

Ownership
- Owner: Vermont Public; (Vermont Public Co.)

History
- First air date: 1973 (as WWPV-FM)
- Last air date: August 23, 2024
- Former call signs: WWPV-FM (1973–2015)

Technical information
- Licensing authority: FCC
- Facility ID: 58598
- Class: A
- ERP: 260 watts
- HAAT: 19.8 meters (65.0 ft)
- Transmitter coordinates: 44°30′28.4″N 73°9′3.2″W

Links
- Public license information: Public file; LMS
- Webcast: Listen live
- Website: Vermont Public Classical

WVTX (88.7 FM) was a radio station formerly licensed to Colchester, Vermont and owned by Vermont Public. The station, established in 1973 by Saint Michael's College as the original FM home of its campus radio station WWPV-FM, last aired programming from the Vermont Public Classical network. Vermont Public turned in the station's license in 2024.

== History ==
=== WWPV-FM ===
WWPV's roots lie in a carrier current AM station with the call letters WSSE, created in the 1950s. This station was initially run by the Edmundite priests that founded Saint Michael's, before becoming more of a student station in later years. In 1973, the college obtained a license to operate on 88.7 FM and put it on the air as WWPV-FM, replacing WSSE. A new station was built in an old military barracks on the college's North Campus, located at Fort Ethan Allen. In 1988, the station moved to the St. Michael's main campus with a new studio space in the newly constructed St. Edmund's Hall.

As WWPV-FM, 88.7 FM operated as a campus radio station under the nickname The Mike. The station allowed any student, faculty, or staff member of SMC to be a DJ, as well as members of the local community. Throughout its existence, WWPV's programming has been freeform in nature, playing music that can't be heard on any commercial or mainstream radio stations in the Burlington area, including indie, jazz, blues, and folk. Each show has its own specialty, so a jazz show might be followed by an indie show, which then might be followed by a punk rock show.

Throughout the 1970s, 80s, and most of the 90s, the station aired live shows throughout the day, but had dead air during overnight hours or during other times when no live DJs were in the studio. This changed in 1999, when WWPV entered a partnership with Vermont Public Radio, in which VPR broadcast its BBC World Service feed at 88.7 FM when there were no live shows being aired. In May 2009, VPR and WWPV mutually agreed to terminate this relationship. WWPV now airs music programming 24 hours a day, seven days a week, with an automated mix of music from the station's music library when there are no DJs in the studio. VPR later shifted its BBC World Service programming to a dedicated HD Radio channel.

WWPV put on free concerts every spring at St. Michael's, a tradition that started in 2007 with a free Zox show. In spring 2008, the station won a nationwide college/university contest through the independent digital music retailer Mytracks.com, winning $5,000 to put towards a concert. The station beat out radio stations and programming boards at prestigious large universities such as Ole Miss, Michigan State, and Kentucky. With its winnings, WWPV brought State Radio to the college to perform a concert at the St. Michael's gymnasium that April.

The WWPV concert took a hiatus in 2009, although the station organized a smaller concert featuring Grimis right before Christmas. Station staff has announced that the concert will be back in 2010, and this time will take place outdoors.

=== Spring 2007 VPR buyout controversy ===
In March 2007, WWPV attracted local attention when Vermont Public Radio approached the college's president, Marc vanderHeyden, and the Board of Trustees with an interest in purchasing the frequency to turn it into a 24-hour classical station. After word of this potential sale became public in the Burlington Free Press and the St. Michael's online magazine, The Echo, SMC students, faculty, and staff rallied against the sale in an effort to preserve the station as a student-run, freeform college station. Numerous letters were written to the Free Press, posters were put up around campus, and a large Facebook group was created to mobilize students. Because of the outcry, vanderHeyden recommended to the board that the station not be sold, effectively ending the possibility of a deal. Vermont Public Radio instead bought 90.9 FM, now known as WOXR, to run the classical format.

=== Donation to Vermont Public Radio ===
On February 12, 2014, Saint Michael's College was granted a construction permit for a low-power FM station on 92.5 FM in Colchester. Under Federal Communications Commission (FCC) regulations, the college was required to divest the 88.7 FM facility upon constructing the new station; on April 8, 2015, it agreed to donate the WWPV-FM license to Vermont Public Radio. On September 14, 2015, WWPV's programming moved to the new WWPV-LP; the following day, WWPV-FM went silent. VPR officially took control of 88.7 FM on September 17, 2015 and changed the station's call sign to WVTX; it intends to move the station's transmitter from the Saint Michael's campus to an as-yet-undetermined location, and will keep WVTX silent until this move is completed. As of June 2018, WVTX was airing VPR Classical programming.

Vermont Public surrendered WVTX's license effective August 23, 2024, in order to make way for a power increase for co-channel WRVT, licensed to Rutland. There was no loss of service as Vermont Public Classical network flagship WOXR (90.9 FM) also covers the greater Burlington area.
