= WVXM (FM) =

- Middlebury, Vermont; United States
- Frequency: 89.1 MHz
- Branding: VPR Classical and WOXM Middlebury at 89.1

Programming
- Format: Classical and opera
- Affiliations: NPR; Public Radio International; American Public Media

Ownership
- Owner: Vermont Public Radio
- Sister stations: WOXM

History
- First air date: April 2014
- Last air date: June 28, 2019
- Former call signs: WVXM (2011–2014); WOXM (2014–2019)

Technical information
- Licensing authority: FCC
- Facility ID: 174747
- Class: A
- ERP: 3,100 watts
- HAAT: 95.3 meters (313 ft)
- Transmitter coordinates: 44°1′34.2″N 73°9′42.4″W

Links
- Public license information: Public file; LMS
- Webcast: Listen live
- Website: vpr.net

WVXM (89.1 FM) was a radio station licensed to Middlebury, Vermont. The station was owned by Vermont Public Radio, and carried classical music through the VPR Classical network.

The 89.1 FM facility signed on in April 2014. VPR Classical was previously heard in Middlebury on 90.1 FM; following the move, the two facilities swapped call letters (with 90.1, the original WOXM, becoming WVXM) and 90.1 left the air. By October 2015, VPR had discovered that WOXM was interfering with the Vermont Electric Power Company's emergency response radio system; on October 12, 2015, VPR Classical was moved back to the 90.1 facility.

On June 28, 2019, the two stations swapped call signs again, with 89.1 FM changing back from WOXM to WVXM. At the same time, Vermont Public Radio surrendered the license for the now-WVXM to the FCC, who cancelled it on July 2, 2019.
