= WWPV-LP =

Radio station at Saint Michael's College in Colchester, Vermont

- Colchester, Vermont; United States
- Broadcast area: Colchester and Burlington
- Frequency: 92.5 MHz
- Branding: 92.5 The Mike

Programming
- Format: College radio; variety

Ownership
- Owner: Saint Michael's College

History
- First air date: September 15, 2015
- Call sign meaning: Winooski Park Vermont

Technical information
- Licensing authority: FCC
- Facility ID: 196089
- Class: L1
- ERP: 100 watts
- HAAT: 24 meters (79 ft)
- Transmitter coordinates: 44°29′38.1″N 73°09′49.4″W

Links
- Public license information: LMS
- Webcast: Listen Live; Listen live (via TuneIn)
- Website: wwpv.smcvt.edu

WWPV-LP (92.5 FM) is a radio station licensed to serve the community of Colchester, Vermont. The station is owned by Saint Michael's College. It airs a variety radio format. This station is the successor to WWPV-FM, the college's prior radio station on 88.7 FM.

== History ==
In 1973, Saint Michael's College signed on WWPV-FM 88.7, originally a 10-watt outlet broadcasting from the Sloan Fine Arts Center on campus. WWPV-FM was the successor to WSSE, a carrier current outlet that had been established in the 1950s. It operated from the North Campus until moving to St. Edmund's Hall in 1988.

Vermont Public Radio, the state's public broadcaster, had expressed interest as early as 2007 in acquiring WWPV-FM to obtain a second FM frequency for classical music. When word of a potential buyout circulated, it prompted students and the community to rally, and the college ruled out a sale.

On February 12, 2014, Saint Michael's College was granted a construction permit for a low-power FM station on 92.5 FM in Colchester. Under Federal Communications Commission (FCC) regulations, the college was required to divest its existing 88.7 FM facility upon constructing the new station; on April 8, 2015, it agreed to donate the WWPV-FM license to Vermont Public Radio. On September 14, 2015, WWPV's programming moved to the new WWPV-LP; WWPV-FM went silent the next day and became WVTX, which returned to the air as a VPR-owned classical music station.
