= WBTN (AM) =

- Bennington, Vermont; United States
- Broadcast area: Southwestern Vermont
- Frequency: 1370 kHz
- Branding: WBTN 96.5 FM 1370 AM

Programming
- Format: Full service variety
- Affiliations: Westwood One

Ownership
- Owner: Shires Media Partnership

History
- First air date: September 23, 1953
- Call sign meaning: Bennington

Technical information
- Licensing authority: FCC
- Facility ID: 9309
- Class: D
- Power: 1,000 watts (day); 85 watts (night)
- Transmitter coordinates: 42°54′19.28″N 73°12′30.39″W
- Translator: 96.5 W243EL (Bennington)

Links
- Public license information: Public file; LMS
- Webcast: Listen live
- Website: www.wbtnam.org

WBTN (1370 kHz) is an AM radio station in Bennington, Vermont. Established in 1953, the station is owned by Shires Media Partnership. WBTN can also be streamed online via TuneIn Radio.

WBTN is run as a community station with a full service variety radio format, including news, talk shows, music and sports. Weekday mornings begin with two nationally syndicated news shows, America in the Morning and First Light from Westwood One. Then "The Big Voice of Southern Vermont morning show with Jessica Lillie and Chris Bates", a talk and music show, is heard. The rest of the schedule is made up of programs hosted by local residents, offering a variety of topics, from local musicians to birds to old time records and radio shows. WBTN is available to be heard on Google home and Alexa.

== History ==
WBTN signed on the air on September 13, 1953. It was originally a 500-watt daytimer, required to sign-off at sunset each day to avoid interfering with other radio stations on AM 1370. It was owned by Catamount Broadcasters, Inc. and aired a full service middle of the road music format. In the 1970s, the power was boosted to 1,000 watts, but the station was still required to go off the air at night. Catamount added an FM radio station, 94.3 WHGC, on October 2, 1978. In 1997, WHGC switched its call sign to WBTN-FM.

WBTN-AM-FM were acquired by Vermont Public Radio (VPR) in 1999 for $901,000. VPR wanted to add WBTN-FM to its statewide network to improve coverage of Southwestern Vermont, and had no interest in operating an AM station. VPR sold WBTN AM to Robert Howe in 2000; Howe then donated the station to Southern Vermont College in 2002.

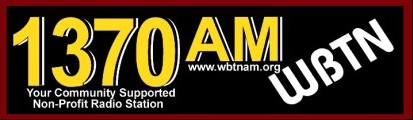
Former logo

In 2008, WBTN was purchased by Shires Media Partnership. A few years later, the Federal Communications Commission granted WBTN permission to broadcast at night with 85 watts of power.

The station began simulcasting a mostly classic rock format at the 96.5 FM dial position in May 2021 using the tagline "We Bring the Noise", a play on the AM station's longtime call letters.

By June 2025, WBTN—which had become a volunteer-run station—had run into financial problems after losing out on a series of state grants, hosts failed to pay the station for their airtime, and listener donations decreased; this led to an unpaid power bill that took WBTN off the air for at least two weeks. Station manager and programmer Jason Lillie said that WBTN needed to spend $2,500 a month at minimum to operate.

== Translator ==
Call sign	Frequency	City of license	FID	ERP (W)	Class	Transmitter coordinates	FCC info
W243EL	96.5 FM	Bennington, Vermont	202924	250	D	42°54′24.1″N 73°12′40.2″W	LMS

== See also ==
- List of community radio stations in the United States
