= WEQX =

Radio station in Manchester, Vermont

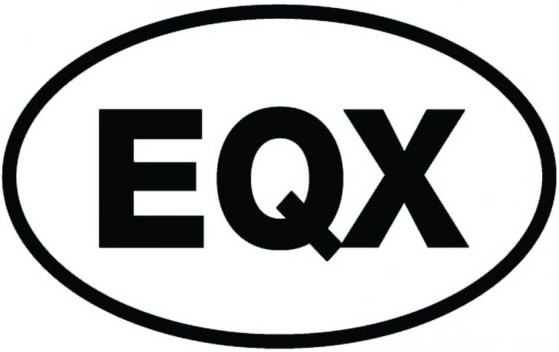

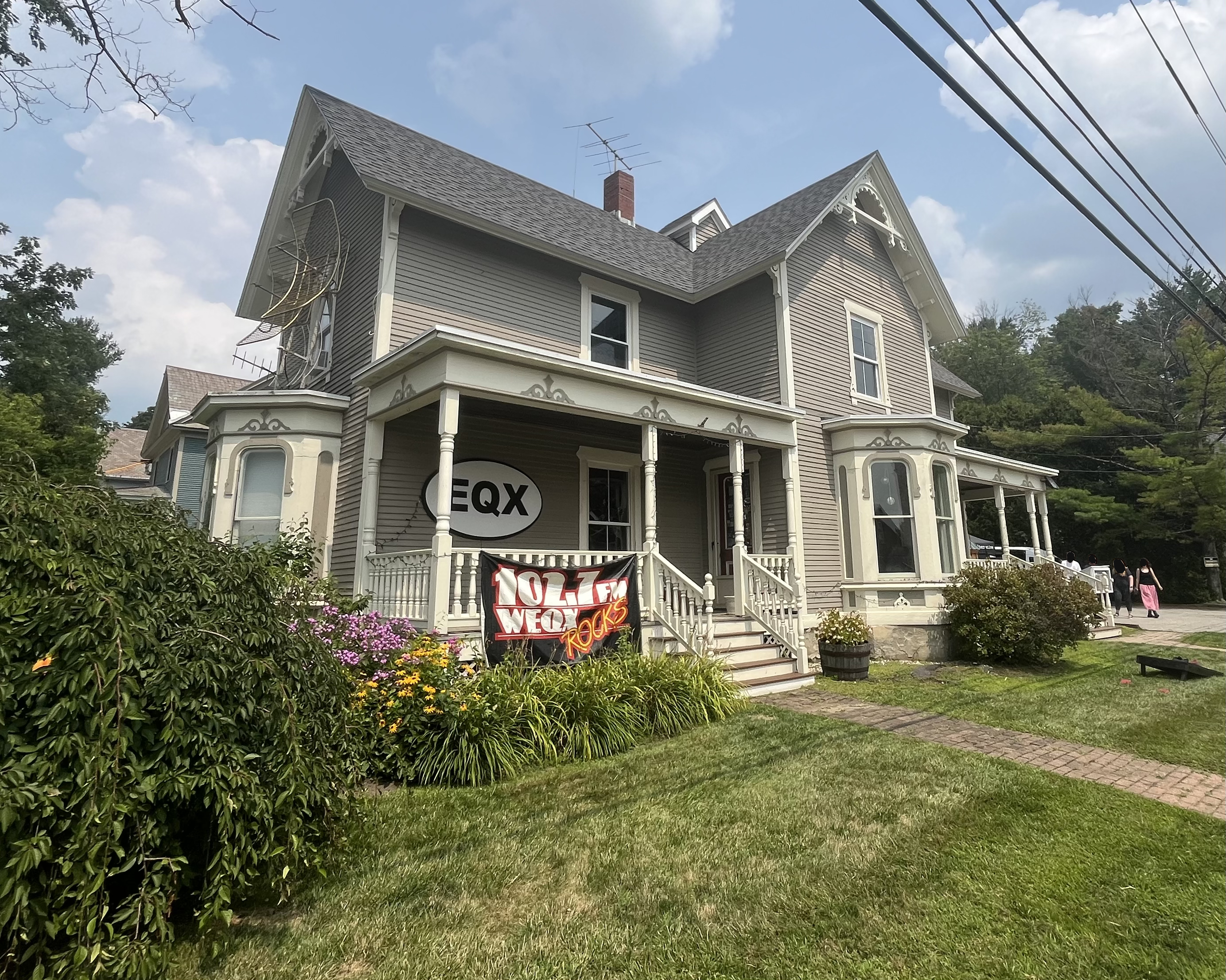
- WEQX station in Manchester (2025)
- Manchester, Vermont; United States
- Broadcast area: Southern Vermont and Capital District of New York
- Frequency: 102.7 MHz
- Branding: 102.7 FM EQX

Programming
- Format: Alternative rock

Ownership
- Owner: Northshire Communications

History
- First air date: November 14, 1984
- Call sign meaning: Mount Equinox

Technical information
- Licensing authority: FCC
- Facility ID: 49706
- Class: B
- ERP: 1,250 watts
- HAAT: 760 meters (2,490 ft)
- Transmitter coordinates: 43.166°N 73.116°W

Links
- Public license information: Public file; LMS
- Webcast: Listen live
- Website: www.weqx.com

WEQX is an independent FM radio station broadcasting from Manchester, Vermont, its city of license. The station broadcasts on 102.7 MHz with an effective radiated power (ERP) of 1,250 watts. With the station's transmitter tower located on nearby Equinox Mountain at an elevation of 2,490 feet (760 m), WEQX reaches the equivalent of 50,000 watts ERP. Because of its signal strength, the station is able to reach the Capital District and Lake George areas of New York, including Albany, Saratoga Springs and Glens Falls, as well as covering southern Vermont and portions of western Massachusetts and New Hampshire. WEQX plays an alternative rock-centered eclectic format more varied than large commercially owned and operated stations.

Despite being located in Vermont, WEQX was voted the best radio station for the Capital Region (Albany, New York) by the Metroland alternative newsweekly for 15 years running up to 2006; it was also voted best radio station of 2002 and 2006 by the Albany Times Union. It has also won Best Radio Station of the Year awards from Rolling Stone magazine in 1993, 1995 and 1996. In addition, the Album Network (a radio industry magazine) voted the station the Best Alternative Radio Station in the Country (small market), in 1995.

== History ==
WEQX was founded in November 1984 by Brooks Brown as an independent radio station, when he moved to Manchester, Vermont, and could not find a station to meet his advertising needs. Brown built the studio himself, and was involved in building the antenna. The station originally broadcast an adult contemporary format for its first ten months of operation until flipping to alternative rock or modern rock in September 1985. The station is located in a Victorian house at 161 Elm Street in Manchester. Some of the DJs on WEQX in their early days as a rock station included Ellen McKinnon formerly of WQBK-FM in Albany, New York, as well as former WPYX DJs Ernie James and John Clark.

WEQX, or "EQX", as it is commonly referred to by its listeners, is a large sponsor of live music and has presented various concerts in the Capital Region (Albany, New York).

In the summer of 2007, EQX held the first EQX Fest at the Saratoga Performing Arts Center. The concert started at 3 PM and ran until around midnight. It had three different stages; one for local bands, one for mainstream bands, and one for the headliners. The headliners included The Nightwatchman, Matisyahu, and 311 (in that order).

On September 28, 2013, EQX held its fourth annual Pearl Palooza in Albany, New York. It was an all day free music festival that featured Portugal. The Man, Said The Whale, Cayucas among others.

On November 14, 2014, WEQX celebrated its 30th anniversary as an independently owned-and-operated Alternative station, one year right after WEQX's founder and owner A. Brooks Brown died in August 2013.

On December 29, 2015, the WEQX transmitter tower collapsed due to ice and wind. Broadcasting continued on their online feed, and reduced coverage was re-established with the use of a temporary tower a few days later.

In 2024, WEQX celebrated forty years on the air.
