= WVLR-FM =

Radio station in Lyndonville, Vermont, US

- Lyndonville, Vermont; United States
- Broadcast area: Northern Caledonia County, Vermont
- Frequency: 91.5 MHz

Programming
- Format: Classical music
- Network: Vermont Public Classical

Ownership
- Owner: Vermont Public Co.

History
- First air date: February 4, 1977
- Former call signs: WWLR (1976–2023)
- Former frequencies: 91.7 MHz (1977–1981)

Technical information
- Licensing authority: FCC
- Facility ID: 6123
- Class: A
- ERP: 3,000 watts
- HAAT: −23.0 meters (−75.5 ft)
- Transmitter coordinates: 44°32′2.1″N 72°1′43.3″W

Links
- Public license information: Public file; LMS

WVLR-FM (91.5 FM) is a radio station that broadcasts a classical music format. Licensed to Lyndonville, Vermont, United States, the station is owned by Vermont Public Co.

From 1977 to 2023, the station operated as WWLR, the college radio station at Lyndon State College and its successor, Northern Vermont University—Lyndon.

== History ==
WVLR-FM began broadcasting as WWLR on February 4, 1977, as a 10-watt outlet broadcasting on 91.7 MHz. In 1981, the station moved to 91.5 MHz as part of a power increase to 3,000 watts. However, three years later, the station was almost shut down when Lyndon State College teachers complained about electromagnetic radiation, though administration kept it on the air; WWLR had been forced off the air earlier in 1984 in order to rectify interference to the meteorology equipment in the college's atmospheric sciences program. As a result, the WWLR tower was relocated, and the station temporarily operated at half-power until the tower was moved.

Vermont Public announced its acquisition of the WWLR license from Northern Vermont University—Lyndon on December 16, 2022, with the intent of adding the station to its classical music network; the student-run programming would continue as an Internet radio station. The trustees of the Vermont State Colleges had voted to put WWLR up for sale in October 2022, after having earlier approved a plan to relinquish the license in December 2021. The purchase, at a price of $80,000, was consummated on April 25, 2023. Vermont Public took the station silent on May 1 to prepare for changes required to transmit its signal. The call sign was changed to WVLR-FM on October 30, 2023; on November 6, it resumed broadcasting at reduced power under special temporary authority as part of Vermont Public Classical.
