= WSYB =

- Rutland, Vermont; United States
- Frequency: 1380 kHz
- Branding: 100.1 WSYB

Programming
- Format: Classic hits
- Affiliations: Red Sox Radio Network

Ownership
- Owner: Pamal Broadcasting; (6 Johnson Road Licenses, Inc.)
- Sister stations: WDVT; WJEN; WJJR; WZRT

History
- First air date: December 10, 1930
- Call sign meaning: "We Serve You Best"

Technical information
- Licensing authority: FCC
- Facility ID: 25740
- Class: B
- Power: 5,000 watts (days); 25 watts (nights)
- Transmitter coordinates: 43°35′30.2″N 72°59′24.4″W
- Translator: 100.1 W261DE (Rutland)

Links
- Public license information: Public file; LMS
- Webcast: Listen live
- Website: www.classichitswsyb.com

WSYB (1380 kHz) is a commercial AM radio station in Rutland, Vermont. Established in 1930, the station is owned by Pamal Broadcasting and broadcasts a classic hits radio format as "100.1 WSYB". WSYB is one of the oldest affiliates on the Boston Red Sox Radio Network.

By day, WSYB is powered at 5,000 watts non-directional; to protect other stations on 1380 AM from interference, it reduces power at night to 25 watts. The transmitter and studios are on Dorr Drive in Rutland, near Otter Creek. Programming is also heard on 250 watt FM translator W261DE at 100.1 MHz; the station's branding reflects this.

== History ==
The station signed on the air on December 10, 1930. It is the second oldest radio station in Vermont, after WVMT in Burlington. WSYB was launched by Henry Seward and Philip Weiss, owners of a music store at 33 Center Street in Rutland. The station broadcast on 1500 kilohertz at 100 watts in 1935. It switched to its current frequency in the mid-1940s. The WSYB call sign stands for, "We Serve You Best". Since the shut down of competitor 970 WHWB in 1993, WSYB remains the only AM radio station serving the local Rutland area. "The WSYB Christmas Fund" has been serving needy families in the Rutland community since the early 1970s.

For many years, WSYB broadcast with a 5,000 watt omnidirectional signal with one tower from local sunrise to local sunset. At night, WSYB utilized two towers with 1,000 watts and a pattern that was aimed mainly northeast of the transmitter site. While the daytime signal provides ample coverage for Rutland County, the nighttime signal missed most of the county south and west of the transmitter site. On the other hand, with the night time signal aimed to the northeast, there had been reception reports from listeners in the Canadian Maritimes, England, and even Finland. In recent years, WSYB gave up its second tower and now broadcasts at a reduced power at night, but added an FM translator for listeners who prefer FM.

Some of the owners for WSYB over the years have included Vermont Radio Inc, All Communications Inc., H & D Media, Excalibur Media, and Clear Channel Communications. WSYB, its FM sister WZRT, and several other Clear Channel properties were swapped out to Pamal Broadcasting in exchange for WRNX in Northampton, Massachusetts. This swap gave Pamal ownership of five out the six commercial radio signals in the local Rutland area.

In the 1960s, 1970s and 1980s, WSYB featured an adult contemporary music format along with news, talk and sports. It was an affiliate of the NBC Radio Network. As music listening increasingly moved to the FM dial, WSYB added more talk programming. By the 1990s, it had made the transition to a talk radio station. On February 16, 2022, the station switched from talk to sports radio as "Fox Sports 1380", carrying the Fox Sports Radio lineup. WSYB returned to a music format on October 2, 2023, when it became a classic hits station as "100.1 WSYB".
