= WOXM (FM) =

- Middlebury, Vermont; United States
- Frequency: 90.1 MHz
- Branding: Vermont Public Classical

Programming
- Format: Classical and opera
- Network: Vermont Public Classical
- Affiliations: NPR; Public Radio Exchange; American Public Media

Ownership
- Owner: Vermont Public; (Vermont Public Co.)

History
- First air date: May 27, 2010
- Former call signs: WOXM (2009–2014); WVXM (2014–2019)
- Call sign meaning: see WOXR; Middlebury

Technical information
- Licensing authority: FCC
- Facility ID: 174578
- Class: A
- ERP: 1,200 watts
- HAAT: 95.3 meters (312.7 ft)
- Transmitter coordinates: 44°1′34.2″N 73°9′42.4″W

Links
- Public license information: Public file; LMS
- Webcast: Listen live
- Website: Vermont Public Classical

WOXM (90.1 FM) is a radio station licensed to Middlebury, Vermont. The station is owned by Vermont Public, and carries classical music through the Vermont Public Classical Classical network.

WOXM signed on May 27, 2010. In April 2014, the WOXM call sign moved to 89.1 FM; the 90.1 FM license then changed its call letters to WVXM and went silent. By October 2015, Vermont Public Radio (VPR) had discovered that the new WOXM was interfering with the Vermont Electric Power Company's emergency response radio system; on October 12, 2015, VPR Classical was moved back to the 90.1 facility. The station changed its call sign back to WOXM on June 28, 2019.
