= WIUV =

American online radio station

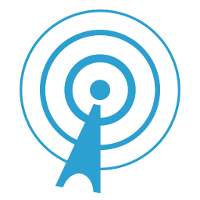

Programming
- Format: College

Ownership
- Owner: Vermont State University; (Board of Trustees, Vermont State Colleges)

History
- First air date: September 15, 1976
- Last air date: May 1, 2019
- Former frequencies: 91.3 MHz (1976–2019)

Technical information
- Licensing authority: FCC
- Facility ID: 4304
- Transmitter coordinates: 43.608°N 73.182°W

Links
- Public license information: Public file; LMS
- Webcast: https://tunein.com/radio/Castleton-Internet-Radio-913-s29701/
- Website: www.castleton.edu/campus-life/clubs-activities/clubs/wiuv/

WIUV is an online Internet radio station in Castleton, Vermont. It is the student-run station of VTSU Castleton (formerly Castleton University). The station signed on the air in 1976 at 91.3 MHz with an ERP of 230 watts from a transmitter located on campus.

== History ==
WIUV was licensed as a 10-watt educational station in 1976. It increased power to 124 watts in 1981 and 227 watts in 1984.

On May 1, 2019, WIUV shut down its FM station and began broadcasting exclusively online. WIUV rebranded as "Castleton Internet Radio." The Vermont State Colleges system concurrently returned the WIUV license to the Federal Communications Commission, which cancelled it on May 22, 2019.

== Programming ==
WIUV's on-air programming consisted of music blocks and original student-produced programs.
