= WZRT =

Radio station in Rutland, Vermont

- Rutland, Vermont; United States
- Broadcast area: South Central Vermont
- Frequency: 97.1 MHz
- Branding: Z97.1

Programming
- Format: Top 40–CHR
- Affiliations: Premiere Networks

Ownership
- Owner: Pamal Broadcasting; (6 Johnson Road Licenses, Inc.)
- Sister stations: WDVT; WJEN; WJJR; WSYB

History
- First air date: 1974
- Former call signs: WRUT (1974–1989)
- Call sign meaning: "Z97 Rutland"

Technical information
- Licensing authority: FCC
- Facility ID: 25741
- Class: C2
- ERP: 1,150 watts
- HAAT: 790 meters (2,590 ft)
- Transmitter coordinates: 43°36′17.2″N 72°49′12.3″W

Links
- Public license information: Public file; LMS
- Webcast: Listen Live
- Website: z971.com

WZRT (97.1 FM) is a Top 40 (CHR) radio station. Licensed to Rutland, Vermont, the station serves the Lebanon-Rutland-White River Junction area of Vermont and New Hampshire. The station is currently owned by Pamal Broadcasting.

== History ==
The station first signed on in 1974 as WRUT. It was owned by Vermont Radio, Inc. and was a sister station to WSYB (1380 AM). The call letters referred to its city of license, Rutland, Vermont.

It took the WZRT call sign in 1989. Z97 branded itself as "The Official Ski Station" and later on as "The Official Ski and Ride Station". Z97 broadcast live from restaurants and nightclubs throughout Killington. In particular, Z97 began a long relationship with two of Killington's largest and famous nightclubs with nightly and apres-ski live broadcasts throughout ski season.

All Communications eventually sold out to H & D Media, which eventually became Excalibur Media. Z97 expanded its winter advertising base to include Okemo, Bromley, Magic Mountain, Sugarbush, West Mountain, and Stratton Mountain. During the late 1990s, Z97 would broadcast the popular "Stratton Mountain Ski and Ride Show" live every Saturday morning from Stratton Mountain from 7 to 10 am.

From 2003 until the middle of 2007, WZRT was in the process of being acquired by Catamount Radio, but never eventually came to fruition. On July 3, 2003, under the ownership of Clear Channel Communications, the station changed its identity to KISS-FM, following the already popular station name from other markets. In May 2006, Albany, New York-based Pamal Broadcasting acquired KISS-FM in a swap of stations with Clear Channel.

In 2007, Pamal returned WZRT to Z97. In early 2008, the station rebranded as Z97.1, adding the syndicated Bob and Sheri morning show from WLNK in Charlotte, North Carolina. In 2011, the show was transferred over to WJJR, co-owned by Catamount Radio. In its place, Elvis Duran and the Morning Show began broadcasting weekday mornings, syndicated from WHTZ in New York City. In April 2025, that show was replaced by The TJ Show, a syndicated show hosted by former Elvis Duran and the Morning Show member TJ Taormina.
