= WOXR =

- Schuyler Falls, New York; United States
- Broadcast area: Burlington/Plattsburgh
- Frequency: 90.9 MHz
- Branding: Vermont Public Classical

Programming
- Format: Classical music and opera
- Network: Vermont Public Classical
- Affiliations: American Public Media; National Public Radio; Public Radio Exchange

Ownership
- Owner: Vermont Public; (Vermont Public Co.)
- Sister stations: WVPS

History
- First air date: November 2004
- Former call signs: WAVX (2004–2007)
- Call sign meaning: Homage to WQXR

Technical information
- Licensing authority: FCC
- Facility ID: 78628
- Class: C2
- ERP: 2,700 watts
- HAAT: 327.2 meters (1,073.5 feet)
- Transmitter coordinates: 44°34′24.2″N 73°40′29.5″W

Links
- Public license information: Public file; LMS
- Webcast: Listen live
- Website: www.vermontpublic.org/vermont-public-classical

WOXR (90.9 FM) is a radio station broadcasting a classical music format. Licensed to Schuyler Falls, New York, United States, the station is owned by Vermont Public as the flagship station of the Vermont Public Classical network.

== History ==
The station went on the air as WAVX in November 2004, a contemporary Christian music station owned by Christian Ministries. WAVX was sold to Vermont Public Radio in 2007 to fund upgrades at sister station WGLY-FM (the "Wave" format would subsequently move to a HD Radio subchannel of WGLY). Christian Ministries ended its operation of the station on August 29, with VPR relaunching the station as the flagship station of VPR Classical two days later. The callsign was changed to WOXR, a homage to WQXR-FM in New York City, on September 26.
