= Vermont Public =

Public broadcaster in Vermont, U.S.

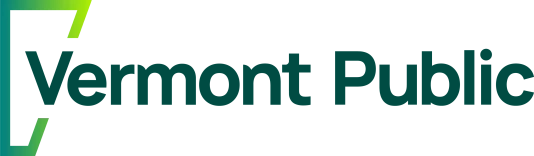
- Predecessor: Vermont PBS; Vermont Public Radio
- Formation: June 30, 2021
- Headquarters: Colchester, Vermont
- Products: Public radio and television broadcasting
- President and CEO: Vijay Singh
- Endowment: $71.9 million (2021)
- Website: vermontpublic.org

Vermont Public Co. is a public broadcaster serving the U.S. state of Vermont. Its headquarters, newsroom, and radio studios are located on Troy Avenue in Fort Ethan Allen in Colchester, with television studios on East Allen Street in downtown Winooski. It operates two statewide radio services aligned with NPR, offering news and classical music, and the state's PBS service. It was formed by the 2021 merger of what had been previously separate organizations, Vermont Public Radio and Vermont Public Television, which were both renamed Vermont Public in 2022.

The services were separate organizations prior to 2021. The first to be founded was Vermont Educational Television (Vermont ETV), originally a service of the University of Vermont, in 1967; the network's four main transmitters were completed in March 1968. Originally mostly funded by the state of Vermont, Vermont ETV began fundraising in the community and developed a substantial audience in the Canadian province of Quebec, which has historically accounted for a significant portion of viewer donations and where a related charity once operated to process Canadian viewers' donations. Vermont ETV was separated from the university in 1989 and later renamed Vermont Public Television and Vermont PBS. In addition to public television programming from PBS and other distributors, Vermont Public produces TV programs of local interest.

Vermont Public's radio operation began broadcasting in 1977 as Vermont Public Radio (VPR). The first transmitter served southern Vermont; coverage of the northern half of the state was added in 1980 and extended by the construction of new stations as well as the acquisition of several existing commercial radio stations. Beginning in the 2000s, VPR established a second radio programming service with a classical music format, which also now has statewide coverage; the existing programming was shifted to an all-talk format with shows from NPR and other public radio distributors as well as local programming focusing on Vermont issues and musical artists.

== History of the Vermont Public Co. ==
In September 2020, the Vermont Public Co. was formed; it became active on June 30, 2021, with the merger of Vermont PBS and Vermont Public Radio, which had been separate entities. The move brought together the 57 full-time VPR employees with 42 at Vermont PBS to create the state's largest news organization, with $90 million in assets. The name Vermont Public was unveiled on June 23, 2022. Its first leader, Scott Finn, stepped down in 2023; a permanent replacement was not hired until Vijay Singh, who had worked in public radio in California, was named in August 2024.

== Television ==
=== History ===
The television service was established by an act of the Vermont General Assembly in 1966 as Vermont Educational Television (Vermont ETV), a service operated by the University of Vermont on behalf of all educational interests in the state. This culminated six years of efforts to set up the service, including two defeats in the 1963 and 1965 sessions of the General Assembly. Broadcasting began on October 16, 1967, from WETK (channel 33) atop Mount Mansfield. Three more transmitters went on air in the months that followed: WVTB (channel 20) on Burke Mountain, serving St. Johnsbury, WVTA (channel 41) on Mount Ascutney, to serve Windsor and southern Vermont, and WVER, broadcasting from Grandpa's Knob to serve Rutland. Delays in completing WVTA, which did not start until March 18, 1968, also held up the activation of WVER.

In 1975, the network began fundraising from the community, having been initially financed 90 percent by the state and later also receiving federal funds. 1979 saw a 57-day strike by production personnel; the next year, the St. Johnsbury and Rutland transmitters narrowly avoided closure when the university voted to allow the installation of remote control equipment, allowing operators to control the facilities from the Mount Ascutney site.

The 1989 session of the General Assembly authorized Vermont ETV's separation from the university. However, funding continued to be a concern. In 1996, the Vermont Senate Appropriations Committee proposed cutting ETV's state funding to $1; ETV eventually was able to restore some of its allocation but still lost about half of its state grant. This was in contrast to Vermont Public Radio, which was not funded by the state and had more corporate contributors.

In 1997, Vermont ETV began 24-hour broadcasting; the name was changed to Vermont Public Television on January 1, 1998, and again to Vermont PBS in 2014. On February 17, 2009, the four main Vermont Public Television transmitters converted to digital broadcasting; in converting early, they joined most of the state's major commercial stations.

On February 17, 2017, Vermont PBS announced that it had sold the WVTA broadcast license for $56 million in the FCC's spectrum auction. In a statement, the network said that its other signals would be upgraded to cover the area served by WVTA. The WVTA license, which continued on the WVER multiplex, was then surrendered for cancellation on November 23, 2022. $52 million of the auction proceeds constitute the majority of Vermont Public's endowment, which stood at $71.9 million in 2021.

Shortly before the merger with Vermont Public Radio, Vermont PBS relocated from Fort Ethan Allen, where both organizations had maintained separate offices, to facilities in Winooski.

=== Local programming ===
The flagship local television program from Vermont Public is the weekly Vermont This Week, which features a rotating panel of Vermont political reporters. Other regular local programs include the outdoors program Outdoor Journal and the local film program Made Here.

=== Support in Canada ===
Public television in Vermont has had a long history with viewers in Montreal, where its signal is received and widely distributed on cable and has been since April 1968. The large audience in Greater Montreal has been a major source of donations: in 1979, Vermont ETV received 60 percent of its donations from Quebec.

In 1989, Vidéotron, one of Montreal's major cable providers, removed Vermont ETV from its channel lineup and replaced it with WCFE in nearby Plattsburgh, New York, to save on copyright fees; at the time, WCFE did not run the entire PBS schedule in order to provide a differentiated service from Vermont ETV. However, the move threatened the financial viability of Vermont ETV because, at the time, as many of 15,000 of the 40,000 Vermont ETV contributors were Montreal-area Vidéotron customers who represented 25 percent of the network's fundraising revenue. Donations to Vermont ETV's March 1990 fundraising drive fell 27 percent. Vidéotron restored Vermont ETV to its lineup in 1991 after a year's absence.

The Canada Revenue Agency (CRA) revoked the status of the Public Television Association of Quebec, a charitable organization in Canada that had supported Vermont PBS's Canadian efforts, in 2013. The CRA decision was unsuccessfully appealed to the Federal Court of Appeal, which ruled in 2015 that the association had "failed to maintain direction and control over its resources as it did not devote all its resources to its own charitable activities" and was only used to generate charitable tax receipts for Canadian donors.

=== Technical information ===
==== Transmitters ====
Vermont Public holds three full-service television station licenses, one of which (WVER) is broadcast as a four-site distributed transmission system. WVER also has two separately licensed translators in Manchester and Pownal.

Vermont Public television stations
Station	City of license	Channel; TV (RF)	Facility ID	ERP	HAAT	Transmitter coordinates	First air date	Public license information
WETK	Burlington	33 (32)	69944	90 kW	830 m (2,723 ft)	44°31′32″N 72°48′51″W	October 16, 1967	Public file; LMS
WVER (Note: The planned site 3, on Mount Anthony near Bennington, was removed before approval. Thus, the sites are numbered 1, 2, 4, and 5.)	Rutland	28 (10)	69946	15 kW	425.6 m (1,396 ft)	43°39′31″N 73°6′25″W	March 18, 1968	Public file; LMS
WVER	Mount Ascutney	28 (10)	69946	5 kW	648.9 m (2,129 ft)	43°26′15″N 72°27′6″W	March 18, 1968	Public file; LMS
WVER	Brattleboro	28 (10)	69946	0.32 kW	−142.9 m (−469 ft)	42°51′6.1″N 72°33′38.8″W	March 18, 1968	Public file; LMS
WVER	Mount Pleasant	28 (10)	69946	0.1 kW	204.3 m (670 ft)	44°7′28.7″N 72°28′52.2″W	March 18, 1968	Public file; LMS
WVTB	St. Johnsbury	20 (28)	69940	75 kW	590 m (1,936 ft)	44°34′16″N 71°53′39″W	February 26, 1968	Public file; LMS

Vermont Public television translators (WVER)
Call sign	City of license	Channel	Facility ID	ERP	HAAT	Transmitter coordinates
W20EH-D	Pownal, VT	20	189111	1.26 kW	367 m (1,204 ft)	42°51′49.8″N 73°13′57.1″W
W30DM-D	Manchester, VT	30	189112	0.796 kW	702 m (2,303 ft)	43°09′57.2″N 73°06′55.3″W

==== Subchannels ====
All transmitters broadcast the same four subchannels.

Vermont Public television subchannels
Channel	Res.	Short name	Programming
xx.1	1080i	VPBS	PBS
xx.2	1080i	VPBS+	PBS Plus/World
xx.3	480i	CREATE	Create
xx.4	480i	KIDS	PBS Kids

==== Network map ====
- Vermont Public television transmitters
- Full-power stations Low-power translators

== Radio ==
=== History ===
In 1975, two groups—the Champlain Valley Educational Radio Association and Vermont Public Radio—were formed by local residents to seek funds to plan a new non-commercial radio station for Vermont. The Champlain Valley group proposed starting with one station in Burlington, while the Vermont Public Radio application focused on statewide coverage, in order to meet requirements from the Corporation for Public Broadcasting (CPB) for minimum population thresholds. In October, Vermont Public Radio received a $25,000 CPB grant, and two months later, the University of Vermont, which at the time administered Vermont ETV, approved the group to share some of its facilities. The existing public television system also shared a founder with the radio network: Raymond V. Phillips, who was considered "the father of public television in Vermont". While Phillips had long expressed interest in public radio, funding did not come until three local ministers objected to a local station's switch to a rock format; one of them later joined the Vermont Public Radio board.

The first transmitter to go on air was WVPA-FM 89.5, (Note: Call sign changed to WVPR on February 6, 1978.) licensed to Windsor and broadcasting from Mount Ascutney, on August 13, 1977. Serving northern Vermont took longer because Vermont Public Radio's application was placed into comparative hearing with several commercial applicants, having filed for the non-reserved frequency of 107.9 MHz. The FCC approved VPR's request to move the frequency from Newport to Burlington despite opposition from a commercial broadcaster in Newport, and WVPS atop Mount Mansfield was activated on October 31, 1980. The Mount Ascutney and Mount Mansfield transmitters gave VPR coverage of 92 percent of the population—greater than Vermont ETV's reach at the time—as well as in northeastern New York, New Hampshire, and Montreal.

Over the years, Vermont Public Radio added transmitters by construction as well as purchases of former commercial stations. WBTN-FM in Bennington was acquired as part of a package with its AM counterpart, WBTN, in 2000; the AM station briefly simulcast VPR programming with local news inserts and death notices until being sold and returned to commercial use. In 2006, VPR purchased the former WJAN in Sunderland, transmitting from Mount Equinox; it is now WVTQ.

In 2004, VPR started WNCH in Norwich, its first dedicated classical music station, and in 2007, it completed its split into two program services. After VPR entered into discussions to purchase WWPV-FM in Colchester from Saint Michael's College in 2007, resistance from student and community groups led to the college refusing to sell. Instead, VPR purchased WAVX, a Christian radio station licensed to Schuyler Falls, New York, and relaunched it as WOXR. (Note: The call sign for WOXR is an homage to New York City classical music station WQXR.) When Saint Michael's obtained a low-power station construction permit in 2015, it then sold the high-power WWPV-FM facility to VPR for integration into the classical network as WVTX.

The VPR studios at Fort Ethan Allen in Colchester were expanded in 2015, nearly doubling the size of the facility. $8 million was raised to finance the addition, which included a newsroom three times the size of the previous space—a converted storage attic—and a studio large enough to accommodate an audience.

In December 2022, Vermont Public announced it would acquire WWLR, which had been the student-run station at Northern Vermont University's Lyndonville campus, for integration into the classical network. Trustees of the university had been attempting to sell the license for months and nearly surrendered it in 2021. The purchase, at a price of $80,000, was consummated on April 25, 2023, and the station was taken silent; Vermont Public would rename the station WVLR-FM. A report by VTDigger suggested that the university may not have been legally empowered to sell WWLR without General Assembly consent. The statute in question was repealed weeks later by governor Phil Scott; in early August, the assembly's Joint Fiscal Committee granted the Vermont State Colleges system, to which Northern Vermont University belonged, retroactive approval to sell WWLR and for the 2019 closure of WIUV at Castleton University.

=== Programs ===
The news service airs major public radio news programs from NPR and other producers, including All Things Considered, Morning Edition, Here & Now, and Marketplace. Four days a week, Vermont Public produces its flagship radio program, Vermont Edition; currently hosted by Mikaela Lefrak, the show was hosted by Jane Lindholm from 2007 to 2021.

The classical service offers blocks of classical music, some with local hosts and others from Classical 24.

=== Transmitters ===
Transmitters are arranged alphabetically by call sign. All full-power transmitters broadcast in HD Radio, carrying the News and Classical services and the BBC World Service as subchannels. A blue background indicates a low-power translator of the full-power transmitter preceding it or, at the end of the table, an HD Radio subchannel of a transmitter in the other network.

==== Vermont Public News ====
Vermont Public News transmitters
Call sign	Frequency	City of license	Facility ID	ERP (W)	HAAT	Class	Transmitter coordinates	Founded
WBTN-FM	94.3 FM	Bennington, VT	9310	3,000	34 m (112 ft)	A	42°56′53.2″N 73°10′32.3″W	October 2, 1978
WRVT	88.7 FM	Rutland, VT	69953	5,600	412 m (1,352 ft)	C2	43°39′31.2″N 73°6′23.4″W	January 10, 1989
W258AW	99.5 FM	Middlebury, VT	139966	38	−16.5 m (−54 ft)	D	44°0′25.2″N 73°10′38.4″W	—
W266AK	101.1 FM	Rupert, VT	140100	10	129 m (423 ft)	D	43°16′52.2″N 73°10′13.4″W	—
WVBA	88.9 FM	Brattleboro, VT	175088	6,200	54 m (177 ft)	B1	42°49′42.4″N 72°35′58.6″W	September 24, 2012
WVPA	88.5 FM	St. Johnsbury, VT	85029	850	569.2 m (1,867 ft)	C2	44°34′15.1″N 71°53′36.3″W	July 21, 1999
WVPR	89.5 FM	Windsor, VT	69951	1,700	694 m (2,277 ft)	B	43°26′15.3″N 72°27′6.3″W	August 13, 1977
W295AU	106.9 FM	Manchester, VT	88164	51	135.5 m (445 ft)	D	43°14′12.3″N 73°1′42.4″W	—
WVPS	107.9 FM	Burlington, VT	69952	48,800	828 m (2,717 ft)	C	44°31′32.1″N 72°48′56.4″W	October 30, 1980
W231BQ	94.1 FM	Montpelier, VT	139908	200	—	D	44°15′22.1″N 72°35′4.1″W	—
W298DD	107.5 FM	Burlington, VT	139952	250	—	D	44°30′28.4″N 73°9′3.2″W	—

==== Vermont Public Classical ====
Vermont Public Classical transmitters
Call sign	Frequency	City of license	Facility ID	ERP (W)	HAAT	Class	Transmitter coordinates	Founded
WNCH	88.1 FM	Norwich, VT	84441	1,550	686.2 m (2,251 ft)	B	43°26′15.3″N 72°27′6.3″W	July 20, 2004
W280CS	103.9 FM	Hanover, NH	31111	250	−122.5 m (−402 ft)	D	43°43′52.2″N 72°16′2.3″W	—
W295AL	106.9 FM	Woodstock, VT	140067	100	—	D	43°37′53″N 72°30′47.1″W	—
WOXM	90.1 FM (Note: In 2014, WOXM moved to 89.1 MHz; interference with the Vermont Electric Power Company's emergency response radio system led VPR to reverse the move on October 12, 2015.)	Middlebury, VT	174578	1,200	95.3 m (313 ft)	A	44°1′34.2″N 73°9′42.4″W	June 8, 2010
WOXR	90.9 FM	Schuyler Falls, NY	78628	2,700	327.2 m (1,073 ft)	C2	44°34′24.2″N 73°40′29.5″W	November 2004
WVER-FM	107.5 FM	West Rutland, VT	762173	450	363 m (1,191 ft)	A	43°39′31.5″N 73°6′23.6″W	August 10, 2023
WVNK	91.1 FM	Manchester, VT	175524	115	96.5 m (317 ft)	A	43°14′12.3″N 73°1′42.4″W	September 2011
WVTI	106.9 FM	Brighton, VT	165996	1,420	211.5 m (694 ft)	A	44°47′2.1″N 71°53′11.3″W	2008
WVTQ	95.1 FM	Sunderland, VT	54687	105	718.9 m (2,359 ft)	A	43°9′56″N 73°7′11.9″W	May 1, 1991
WVXR	102.1 FM	Randolph, VT	63473	11,000	133 m (436 ft)	C3	43°57′20.2″N 72°36′13.9″W	October 25, 1982
WVLR-FM	91.5 FM	Lyndonville, VT	6123	3,000	−23 m (−75 ft)	A	44°32′2.1″N 72°1′43.3″W	February 4, 1977
W227CA	93.3 FM	Rupert, VT	140093	10	129 m (423 ft)	D	43°16′52.2″N 73°10′13.3″W	—
W232CG	94.3 FM	Brattleboro, VT	139889	150	—	D	42°49′42.4″N 72°35′58.6″W	—
W233BD	94.5 FM	Burlington, VT (Note: The translator serves Shelburne but not Burlington.)	139944	27	42.7 m (140 ft)	D	44°21′29.3″N 73°14′48.1″W	—
W243DT	96.5 FM	Waterbury, VT	139911	250	—	D	44°27′49.7″N 72°44′41.8″W	—
W250CZ	97.9 FM	South Bennington, VT	140091	120	1.7 m (6 ft)	D	42°56′53.2″N 73°10′32.3″W	—
W256CW	99.1 FM	Rutland, VT	139970	180	—	D	43°39′31.2″N 73°6′23.4″W	—
W258AZ	99.5 FM	Newbury, VT	155335	10	114.5 m (376 ft)	D	44°3′13.2″N 72°8′25.3″W	—
W258BZ	99.5 FM	Montpelier, VT	139919	200	—	D	44°15′22.1″N 72°35′4.1″W	—

==== Network maps ====
- Vermont Public News transmitters
- Full-power stations Low-power translators
- Vermont Public Classical transmitters
- Full-power stations Low-power translators
