= WBTN-FM =

- Bennington, Vermont; United States
- Frequency: 94.3 MHz (HD Radio)
- Branding: Vermont Public

Programming
- Format: Public radio; news/talk, jazz
- Subchannels: HD2: Classical "Vermont Public Classical"
- Network: Vermont Public
- Affiliations: NPR; Public Radio Exchange; American Public Media

Ownership
- Owner: Vermont Public; (Vermont Public Co.)

History
- First air date: August 21, 1978
- Former call signs: WHGC (1978–1997)
- Call sign meaning: Bennington

Technical information
- Licensing authority: FCC
- Facility ID: 9310
- Class: A
- ERP: 3,000 watts
- HAAT: 34 meters (112 ft)
- Transmitter coordinates: 42°56′53.2″N 73°10′32.3″W
- Translator: HD2: 97.9 W250CZ (South Bennington)

Links
- Public license information: Public file; LMS
- Webcast: Listen live
- Website: www.vermontpublic.org

WBTN-FM (94.3 FM) is a radio station licensed to Bennington, Vermont. The station is owned by Vermont Public, and is an affiliate of their news and information network.

== History ==
The station signed on as WHGC in 1979, airing an adult contemporary format. In 1990, the format was flipped to album rock, and the station's motto was "The Heart of Rock". In 1995, the format was changed to Top 40 as "The Mix", and the call letters were later changed to WBTN-FM in 1997. In 1999, the station was purchased by Vermont Public Radio as part of its effort to build a two-channel network. While WAMC in Albany, New York, has long claimed Bennington as part of its primary coverage area, VPR's purchase of WBTN gave this part of Vermont access to Vermont-based public radio programming for the first time.

== Translator ==
Call sign	Frequency	City of license	FID	ERP (W)	HAAT	Class	Transmitter coordinates	FCC info
W250CZ	97.9 FM	South Bennington, Vermont	140091	120	1.7 m (6 ft)	D	42°56′53.2″N 73°10′32.3″W	LMS
