= WJJR =

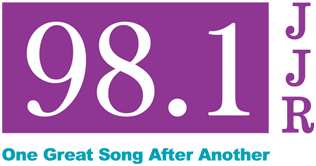
- Rutland, Vermont; United States
- Broadcast area: Rutland, Vermont
- Frequency: 98.1 MHz
- Branding: 98.1 JJR

Programming
- Format: Adult contemporary
- Affiliations: Compass Media Networks; Premiere Networks

Ownership
- Owner: Pamal Broadcasting; (6 Johnson Road Licenses, Inc.)
- Sister stations: WDVT; WJEN; WSYB; WZRT

History
- First air date: March 25, 1971 (as WHWB-FM)
- Former call signs: WHWB-FM (1971–1984)

Technical information
- Licensing authority: FCC
- Facility ID: 31112
- Class: C2
- ERP: 1,150 watts
- HAAT: 790 meters (2,590 ft)
- Transmitter coordinates: 43°36′17.2″N 72°49′12.3″W

Links
- Public license information: Public file; LMS
- Webcast: Listen live
- Website: wjjr.net

WJJR (98.1 FM, "98.1 JJR") is an American radio station broadcasting an adult contemporary music format. Licensed to Rutland, Vermont, United States, the station serves the Lebanon-Rutland-White River Junction area. The station is currently owned by Pamal Broadcasting.

== History ==
The station was assigned call sign WHWB-FM on March 18, 1969; it signed on March 25, 1971, and was licensed on May 4. On August 24, 1984, the station changed its call sign to the current WJJR. During the late 1980s, the station had an easy listening format as "Stereo FM 98.1", playing a mix of instrumental versions of popular songs and soft Adult Contemporary songs with vocals. On air, it was calling itself "Easy Contemporary JJR".

In 1991, some scenes for the science fiction movie Time Chasers were filmed at the WJJR studios.
