= WDVT =

- Rutland, Vermont; United States
- Broadcast area: Lebanon-Rutland-White River Junction
- Frequency: 94.5 MHz
- Branding: Rock 94.5

Programming
- Format: Classic rock
- Affiliations: United Stations Radio Networks; New England Patriots Radio Network

Ownership
- Owner: Pamal Broadcasting; (6 Johnson Road Licenses, Inc.)
- Sister stations: WJEN; WJJR; WSYB; WZRT

History
- First air date: September 24, 1990
- Former call signs: WHWB-FM (1990–1991); WYOY (1991–1994); WJEN (1994–2008)
- Call sign meaning: "Drive Vermont"

Technical information
- Licensing authority: FCC
- Facility ID: 14719
- Class: A
- ERP: 6,000 watts
- HAAT: 98 meters (322 ft)
- Transmitter coordinates: 43°34′4.2″N 73°0′30.4″W

Links
- Public license information: Public file; LMS
- Webcast: Listen live
- Website: www.rock945vt.com

WDVT (94.5 FM) is a radio station broadcasting a classic rock music format branded as "Rock 94.5". Licensed to Rutland, Vermont, United States, the station serves the Lebanon-Rutland-White River Junction area. The station is currently owned by Pamal Broadcasting.

== History ==
The station was originally assigned the call letters WHWB-FM on September 24, 1990. On April 15, 1991, the station changed its call sign to WYOY. WYOY went off the air on December 2, 1992, due to financial and technicial reasons and was sold to Rutland Community Broadcasting, run by owners John Kimel and David Kimel. After nearly year of silence, WYOY was bought by Katie Edwald Adams for $150,000 on November 5, 1993. On January 28, 1994, the radio station went back on the air and the call sign was changed to WJEN. On February 8, 2008, the country format ("Cat Country") and WJEN call sign were moved to 105.3 FM, with 94.5 FM WDVT becoming the simulcast station. After two weeks of simulcasting its former format, WDVT became a classic hits station known as "The Drive". The new format began at 6:00 a.m. on February 22, 2008. The first song "The Drive" played was Bachman-Turner Overdrive's "You Ain't Seen Nothing Yet".

On August 31, 2018, the station flipped to classic rock with the new brand of "Rock 94.5".

WDVT was an affiliate station of the "Floydian Slip" Pink Floyd show from 2010 to 2024.

The WDVT call sign was previously used in the early 1980s on a Philadelphia AM station, now operating as WURD.
