= Jacquie Jordan =

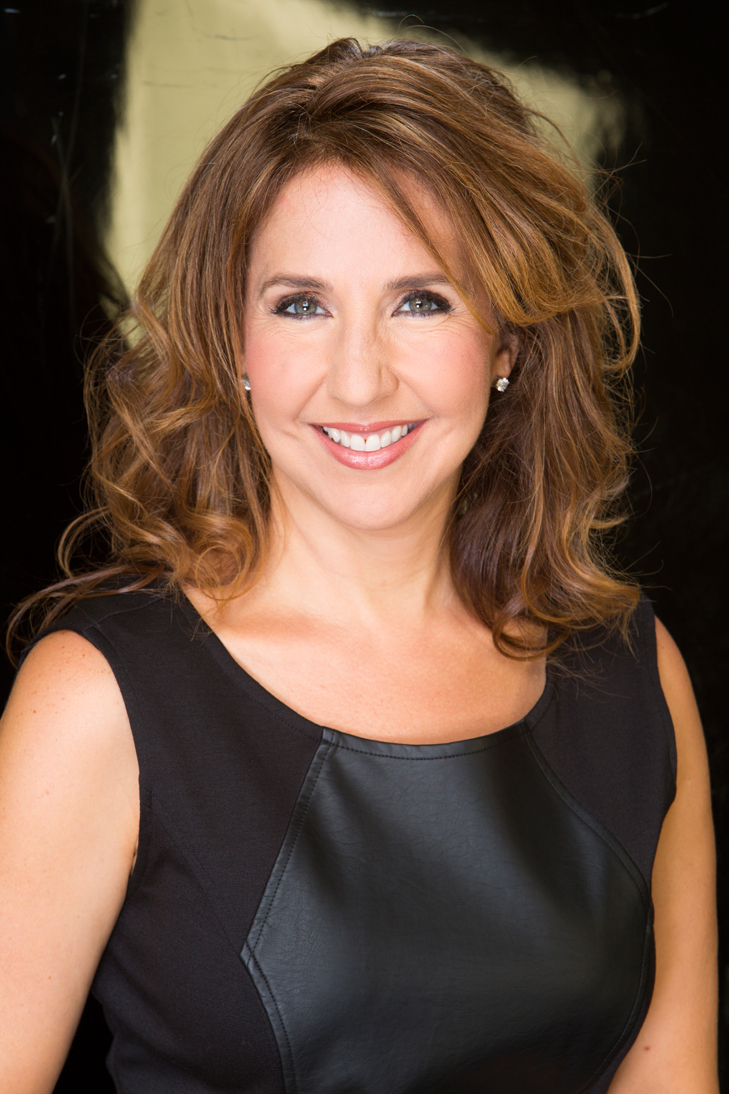
- Born: Jacquelyn Jordan
- Occupations: Television producer, media consultant
- Notable work: Donny & Marie Show
- Website: Jacquie Jordan

Jacquie Jordan is an American television producer and media consultant. Jordan is best known for co-producing a season of Donny & Marie (1998), which was nominated for two Emmy Awards. She was also a co-producer for Sunday Morning Shootout for three years, and an executive producer for Square Off.

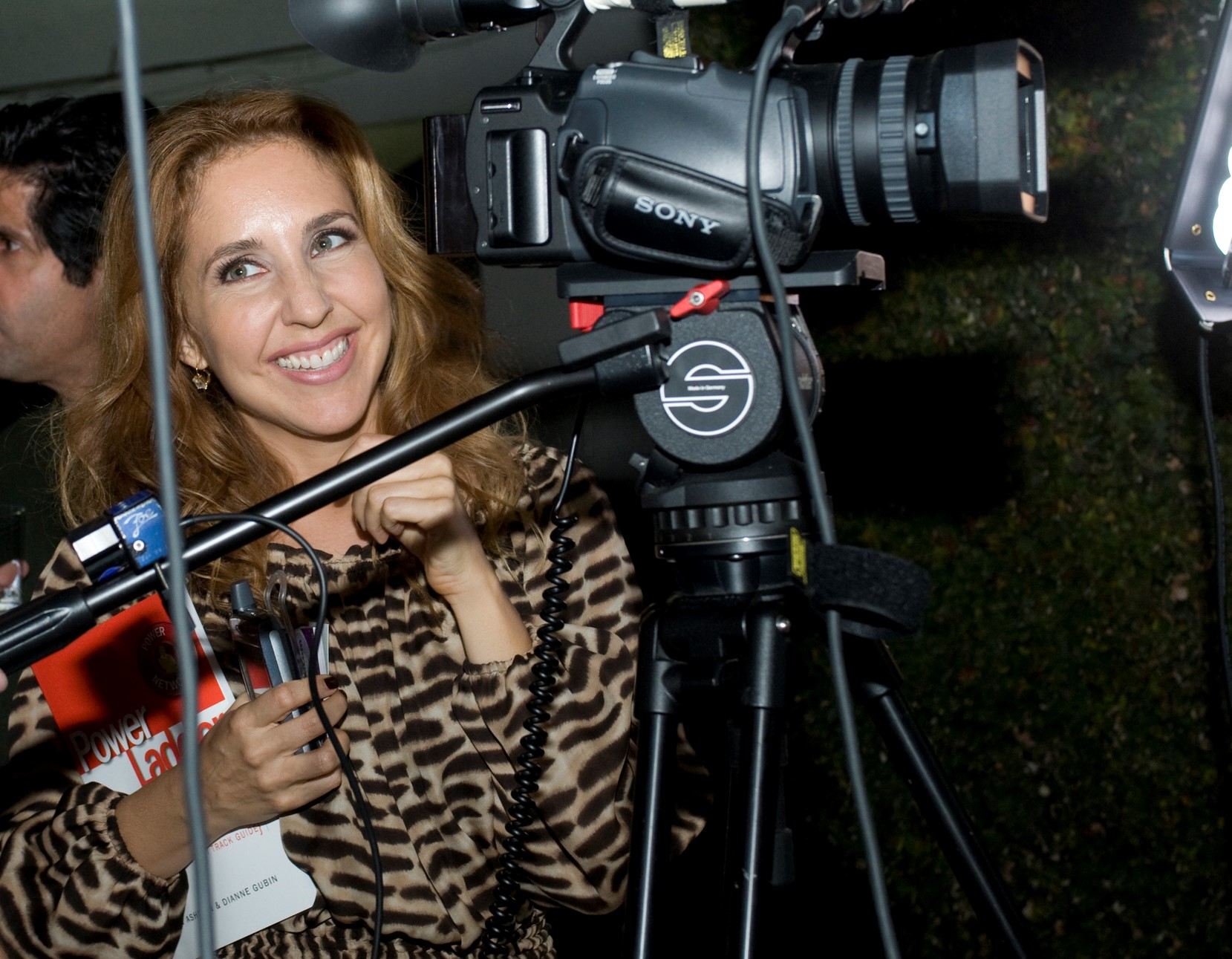
Jacquie Jordan in Production

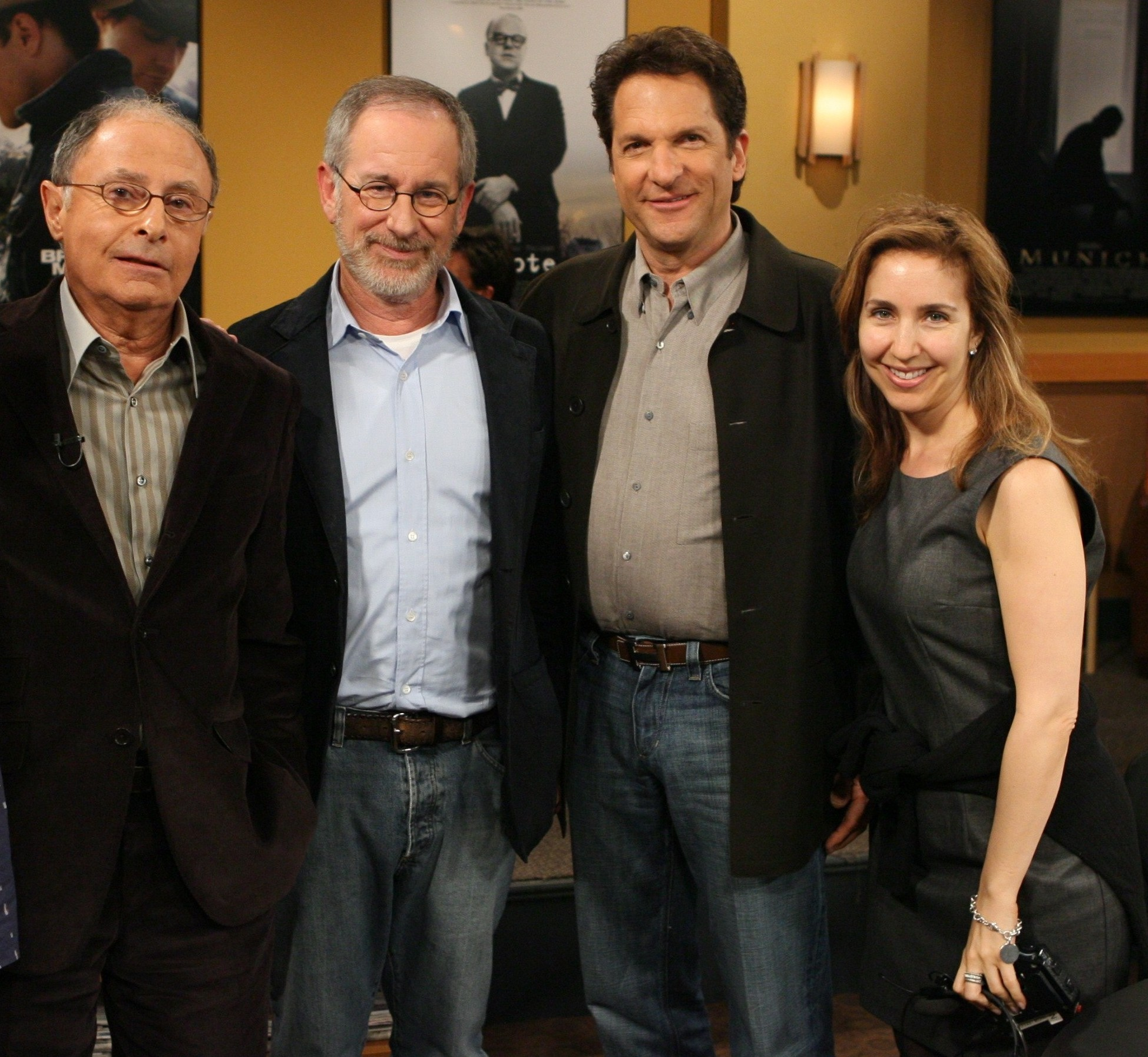
Jordan with Peter Bart (host), Steven Spielberg (guest), and Peter Guber (host)

== Early life and education ==
Jordan grew up in New Jersey and graduated from the University of Delaware with a B.A. in Communications and a minor in Theater. Jordan sold her first TV show at the age of 24 by going door to door to various New Jersey Cable Stations. She decided to open her own media development company because she saw an opportunity to help connect “camera-ready experts” or “guestperts™” with producers. Jordan is quoted as stating that women business owners, “...need to reach down to the younger women and even girls and pull them up the ladder as we go along, through mentoring, coaching and encouragement."

In 2009, Jordan was set up by Sacha Baron Cohen for a scene in the mockumentary comedy feature Brüno, but the scene did not make it into the movie.

In 2020, Jordan was invited back by her alma mater, University of Delaware, to speak about Generation X: Why We Deserve New Branding for their annual TEDx event.

== Career ==
Jordan was a local New Jersey disc jockey for WSUS, and a news reporter for WNNJ-FM, WNNJ and WMBC-TV. In July 2000, she launched Jacquie Jordan Inc, a Los Angeles based media consultancy company. In 2002, Jordan launched a spinoff company, TVGuestpert™. In 2006, Jordan published the book Get on TV!: The Insider’s Guide to Pitching the Producers and Promotion Yourself (Sourcebooks, Inc) and in 2010 she published Heartfelt Marketing: Allowing the Universe to be Your Business Partner (BurmanBooks).

In 2020, Jacquie Jordan's publishing company, TVGuestpert Publishing™, released the eBook: Left Out: When the Truth Doesn't Fit In, by Tara Reade. Jordan told Fox News, "As a woman-owned business, we believe Tara Reade's story was worth being written, memorialized and shared."

=== Film and television ===
In 1997-1998, Jordan was a producer on the Geraldo Rivera Show and in 1998-1999, she worked on Maury.

Jordan helped produce a season of Donny & Marie (1998), which was nominated for two Emmy Awards. In 2003, Jordan became the co-executive producer for the talk show Sunday Morning Shootout, hosted by Peter Bart and Peter Guber, and ran the show for its first three years. In 2005, Jordan became the executive producer of Square Off, a Sunday morning television debate program hosted by Andy Wallenstein and Brian Lowry.

Jordan has written contributions for Conscious Company Magazine and Huffington Post.

Jordan started her publishing company, Jacquie Jordan Publishing Inc., which started with her first published book, Alex Detail's Revolution, by Darren Campo in 2009. The company became TVGuestpert™ Publishing with Christy Whitman’s book, The Art of Having it All: A Woman's Guide To Unlimited Abundance, which made the New York Times best seller list, under Advice, How-To & Miscellaneous, in March 2015.

Jordan curated the inaugural TEDxFranklin in Franklin in March 2022, with 12 speakers.
