= WVPO =

WVPO may refer to:

- WVPO (FM), a radio station (96.7 FM) licensed to serve Lehman Township, Pennsylvania, United States
- WPCO (AM), a radio station (840 AM) licensed to serve Stroudsburg, Pennsylvania, which held the call sign WVPO from 1948 to 2023
- WSBG, a radio station (93.5 FM) licensed to serve Stroudsburg, Pennsylvania, which held the call sign WVPO-FM from 1964 to 1983
