= WGNY =

WGNY can refer to:

- WGNY (AM), a radio station at 1220 AM located in Newburgh, New York
- WGNY-FM, a radio station at 98.9 FM located in Rosendale, New York
- WJGK, a radio station at 103.1 FM located in Newburgh, New York, formerly WGNY-FM
