= WSUS (FM) =

Adult Contemporary radio station in Franklin, New Jersey

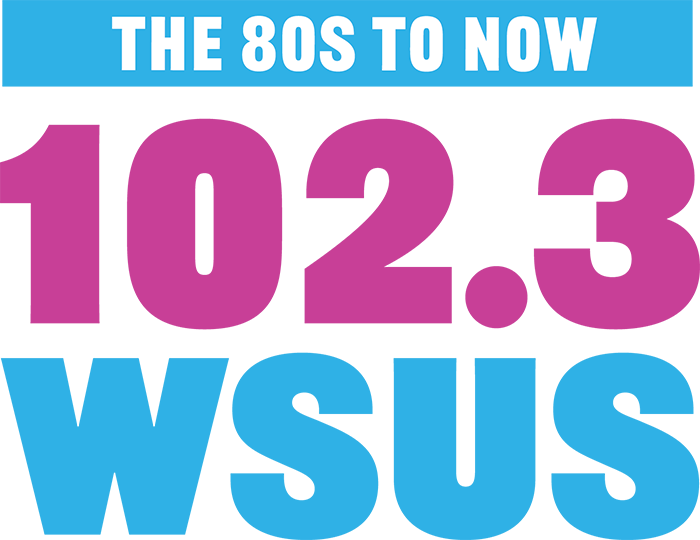
- Franklin, New Jersey; United States
- Broadcast area: Sussex County, New Jersey
- Frequency: 102.3 MHz
- Branding: 102.3 WSUS

Programming
- Format: Adult contemporary
- Affiliations: Premiere Networks

Ownership
- Owner: iHeartMedia, Inc.; (iHM Licenses, LLC)
- Sister stations: WNNJ, WHCY

History
- First air date: February 28, 1965
- Former call signs: WLVP (1965–1971)
- Call sign meaning: Sussex County

Technical information
- Licensing authority: FCC
- Facility ID: 74077
- Class: A
- ERP: 590 watts
- HAAT: 218 meters (715 ft)
- Transmitter coordinates: 41.143°N 74.539°W

Links
- Public license information: Public file; LMS
- Webcast: Listen live (via iHeartRadio)
- Website: wsus1023.iheart.com

WSUS (102.3 FM) is a commercial radio station licensed to Franklin, New Jersey, United States, and serving the Sussex County area of North Jersey. It is owned by iHeartMedia, Inc., and has an adult contemporary format, switching to Christmas music for much of November and December.

The transmitter is on Esto Lane in Hardyston Township, New Jersey and the studios are on Mitchell Avenue in Franklin.

== History ==
=== Country and Top 40 ===
The station signed on the air on February 28, 1965. Its original call sign was WLVP, named for Louis VanderPlatte, the station's founder. The studio, transmitter, and VanderPlatte's house were atop Hamburg Mountain, overlooking Franklin and Sussex County's central valleys. The station's power was 360 watts, and it initially had a Country and Southern Gospel format.

In 1971, WLVP was sold for $75,000 to Peter Bardach, an advertising executive who lived in New Jersey and worked on Madison Avenue. Bardach changed the station's call letters to WSUS. (Bardach's company was Sussex County Stereo, even though WSUS itself broadcast a mono signal for several years before actually going stereo.) James Normoyle, a veteran disc jockey who used the name Jay Edwards, was hired as Sales Manager in 1972 and later became General Manager and part owner with Bardach. Normoyle eventually became the full owner.

The station had a Top 40/Country hybrid format called "Town & Country". Half the songs played were current Top 40 Hits, and half the songs were country, including current hits and older songs. In 1975 WSUS changed its nighttime format to Top 40/Rock, mixing Top 40 and Rock cuts both old and new. During the day, it continued the Top 40/Country hybrid format.

In 1973 the station moved its studios from the mountaintop to 75 Main Street in Franklin. The transmitter remained on the mountain and the power was eventually raised to the current level of 590 watts.

WSUS slogans included "All Hit Music" and "Dependable WSUS". The station had half-hourly newscasts on weekdays, known as "First Report News". WSUS consistently was at or near the top when ratings are measured. Sussex County occasionally was a rated market when WSUS and WNNJ would pay Arbitron to measure listenership in Sussex County. This is known as "Buying the Book". In such a practice, local stations in an area pay in order to get rated for their home county.

=== Adult Contemporary ===
In the winter of 1982, WSUS dropped the Top 40/Country hybrid format during the day and the Top 40/Rock format at night. It became an adult contemporary radio station. The station became a slightly hotter AC by the late 1980s. The station continued with weekend specialty shows as well.

In 1991, WSUS gradually moved into a regular mainstream adult contemporary format. In 1997 Jay Edwards sold WSUS to Nassau Broadcasting Partners, and channeled his earnings into a brief career in harness racing. He died in 2002. Early in 1998 Nassau took over the station and revamped the format. The station used the slogan "The Best Variety of Soft Rock". It added Delilah, a syndicated love songs show, in the 7 p.m.-to-midnight time slot. The station also added new jingles as well. By now, the market was rated twice a year. In all but a few books, WSUS has been the number one station in the area. Occasionally now co-owned classic rock station WNNJ was on top.

=== Changes in ownership ===
In the winter of 2001 Clear Channel Communications purchased all the Nassau Broadcasting stations in the Sussex/Warren/Monroe County cluster except for WVPO, WSBG, and AM 960 located in Stroudsburg, Pennsylvania. The deal included WSUS, WHCY, WNNJ (AM) (now WTOC (AM)), WNNJ (FM), and local marketing agreements for WDLC and WTSX (which would end in the fall of 2004). WSUS remained an AC station with no changes. In exchange for these stations, Nassau was paid a good sum of cash plus WEEX and WODE-FM in the Lehigh Valley (which Clear Channel had to sell due to the merger with AM/FM/Chancellor).

Clear Channel consolidated the studios of the Sussex and Warren County stations, all at 45 Ed Mitchell Avenue in Franklin. In 2014, Clear Channel changed its name to iHeartMedia.

== Former on-air staff ==
- Ansel Bartley
- Dom Coles
- Rick Davis
- Jimmy Diele
- Mark Fowser (news)
- Frank Garrity
- Jimmy Howes
- Tom Kennedy
- Lee Ryder (Stan Olochwoszcz)
- Dave Margalotti (PM Drive/Program Director)
- Robert Hantson (Bob Knight)
- Pat Murphy
- Pete Greco
- Frank Truatt
- Tom Rocco
- Forest Green (Bob Morris)
- Dave Searls (news) (now known as Doc Searls)
- Vince Toscano (Vince Thomas)
- Scott Davies
- Donald Trapp
- John Agress (news)
- Linda Walsh (news)
- Jeff Earnest (news)
- Jerry Keenan (news)
- Bob McDevitt (news)
- David Matthau (news)
- Jerry Morelli (sports)
- Bob Gleason (sports)
- Eric Slater
- Bob Bober (air name: Bob Roberts)
- Bob O' Brien
- Rene' Tetro (air name: Johnny Fredericks)
- Chuck O'Brien (changed to Jim Preston)
- Country Dee
- Frank Bruno
- Wayne Scott
- Dylan Reason-News
- Dick Bartley-News
- Scott Charles (Kienzlen)
- Steve Thorpe (Weather)
- Jerry Miller (News)
- Racquel Williams (News)
- Jack Dagostaro (sports)
