= Nassau Broadcasting Partners =

American radio broadcast company

Nassau Broadcasting Partners LP was a company based in Princeton, New Jersey that owned radio stations in New England and the Mid-Atlantic United States. Nassau's stations, which included both AM and FM frequencies, were located in Maryland, New Jersey, and Pennsylvania. The company was owned and headed by Louis F. Mercatanti. Nassau was predominantly an operator of radio stations in medium and small markets. Nassau formerly owned radio station WCRB in Waltham, a Boston suburb, and located in the Boston market, the 11th largest radio market in the US, according to BIA Financial Network. However that station was sold to WGBH in 2009. Nassau operated radio stations in substantially all of the major formats. The company's most common format was classic rock/classic hits. On October 13, 2011 Nassau Broadcasting entered Chapter 11 bankruptcy protection after their senior lenders petitioned for an involuntary Chapter 7 liquidation in September. The stations were auctioned to various bidders in May 2012 subject to bankruptcy judge and FCC approval. Nassau's last station, WPLY in Mount Pocono, Pennsylvania, lost its license in 2014 after having shut down in 2011.

== History ==
Nassau Broadcasting was founded by Herb Hobler with the acquisition of WHWH 1350 in Princeton, New Jersey. That station employed a full-service MOR format. WHWH-FM was eventually launched and became WPST on 97.5 FM by 1975. WPST employed a rock-based Top 40 format. WPST was one of the most successful medium market stations in the country. Until the early 1990s WPST and WHWH were the only stations owned by Nassau.

In 1986, Louis F. Mercatanti, a successful New Jersey entrepreneur, acquired Nassau Broadcasting from Hobler. Mercatanti continued to operate Nassau as a two-station radio group until 1993, when the FCC raised the limits for the number of radio stations that any one company could own in a particular market.

In 1994, Nassau acquired then-Top 40/Rock 93.5 WSBG and then-adult contemporary 840 WVPO in Stroudsburg, Pennsylvania. WSBG eventually segued to a pop alternative format in early 1996, moving back to top 40 later that year. The station then evolved to more of a Hot AC format late in 1997 and flipped to an adult rock format in 2000. WVPO became a MOR/adult standards station in 1997. In the spring of 1996, Nassau acquired then-country music station 106.3 WHCY in Blairstown, New Jersey, which served Stroudsburg as well as the Sussex County, New Jersey radio markets. This station would for a few years remain a country music station. Shortly afterward, Nassau went on a buying spree of radio stations.

In August, 1996, Nassau entered into an agreement with Great Scott Broadcasting to acquire religious station WCHR 94.5 FM and sports station WTTM serving the Trenton area. The religious format that was on WCHR FM moved to the AM station which was renamed WCHR AM, while the FM station at 94.5 (formerly WCHR FM) became oldies station WNJO. Nassau operated these stations pursuant to a Local Marketing Agreement (LMA) until 2002.

At the end of 1996 Nassau acquired 1360 WNNJ (now WTOC) and WNNJ-FM (now WNNJ) in the Sussex County market licensed to Newton, New Jersey. Early in 1997 WNNJ-FM dropped its Hot AC format in favor of a pop-leaning classic rock format known as Classic Hits. WNNJ would drop Satellite Oldies in favor of Stardust, a satellite-based pop standards/oldies hybrid format.

In 1997, Nassau bought AM stations 1160 WOBM and 1310 WADB in Monmouth County, New Jersey, along with adult contemporary stations WJLK, WOBM-FM, and WQNJ (which became WBBO and now WKMK). AM stations WOBM and WADB became adult standards stations, while WOBM-FM remained an adult contemporary station. WJLK-FM became a pop alternative-based Hot AC station. In the spring of 1997 WBBO left the WJLK simulcast and became B 98, employing a CHR format.

In September 1998, Nassau agreed to sell radio stations WSBG FM and WVPO AM, licensed to Stroudsburg and East Stroudsburg, Pennsylvania respectively, to Multicultural Radio Broadcasting, Inc. Nassau began managing these properties pursuant to an LMA in November 1998. In 2000, WSBG ultimately dropped its Hot AC format in favor of an 80's and 90's based pop adult rock format.

Nassau also began managing WDLC and WTSX in Port Jervis, New York and flipped WTSX to oldies from adult contemporary and WDLC to standards from oldies. WTSX served Middletown, New York and the Sussex County markets, while WDLC served Port Jervis. At the end of 1997, Nassau also bought locally owned WSUS, which was and still is an adult contemporary radio station.

In March 2000, Nassau signed definitive agreements to acquire Aurora Broadcasting. Aurora operated stations in southern New York state and western Connecticut. In order to fund the Aurora acquisition and to accomplish an overall recapitalization of the company, Nassau initiated the process to take the company public in early 2000. During the process of executing the IPO, the Dow Industrial Average dropped approximately 30% and the company cancelled the IPO. The Aurora deal was cancelled that fall.

On August 25, 2000, WHCY dropped its country music format in favor of CHR and became known as "Max 106.3". WSBG dropped its Hot AC format in favor of an 80's and 90's based pop adult rock format.

In the summer of 2000, Nassau agreed to buy Oldies 99.9 WODE and Sports 1230 WEEX in the Lehigh Valley market from Clear Channel Communications. But when Clear Channel merged with AM/FM, they agreed to give Nassau WEEX and WODE plus some cash in exchange for WNNJ, WNNJ-FM, WSUS, and WHCY. Clear Channel also would get management contracts to run WDLC and WTSX. Nassau would keep LMAs for WVPO, WSBG, and WPMR (later WPLY), and eventually buy them back outright.

So in February 2001, the Sussex County cluster of stations would become Clear Channel stations. Nassau also sold the Monmouth County stations including WBBO, WJLK, WADB, and WOBM-AM-FM to Millennium Radio Group, LLC, which also owns WKXW New Jersey 101.5, a talk station weekdays with a 70's based oldies format on weekends.

Also in 2001, Nassau signed on WCHR FM in Monmouth County. That station employed a classic hits format but was eventually also sold to Millennium Radio Group, LLC. Nassau was down to WHWH, WJHR, WCHR, WNJO, WPST, WVPO, WPMR, and WSBG. Except for WPST, Nassau's FM stations all had rock-based classic hits formats of some sort. AM stations had formats such as talk, oldies, or sports. WVPO was flipped to oldies from MOR/Standards. WPST was and still is a CHR station.

In 2004, former Citigroup Media investment banker Tristram Collins joined Nassau as its Sr. Executive Vice President to help Louis Mercatanti grow and operate the company through a series of acquisitions. Nassau expanded significantly through acquisition in 2004 in New England. Nassau first acquired stations in Maine and New Hampshire in early 2004, and later that year, Nassau added more stations in New Hampshire and also in Vermont. Nassau quickly became one of the largest broadcasters in New England with 37 stations in the region. In 2005, Nassau expanded its East Coast footprint to include Maryland through a purchase of two FM and an AM station in Frederick and Hagerstown. Nassau also added stations in Cape Cod, Massachusetts, through a purchase of three FM stations from Qantum Communications in 2005.

In 2006, Nassau entered into an LMA and option agreement with WDAC broadcasting to operate and acquire WBYN FM, a religious format station in Reading, Pennsylvania. Nassau agreed to maintain the religious format and moved the format to one of its local AM stations, WYNS, which was renamed WBYN AM. Nassau then launched its new classic hits format Frank FM and renamed the former WBYN FM to WFKB FM.

Nassau has also recently made a number of changes in the Trenton, New Jersey market. In 2005, the company swapped formats on its two Trenton FM stations (WPST, CHR format and WTHK, classic rock format). During this time period, by changing the city of license on 97.5 FM and making application to the FCC for a change of transmitter location, Nassau received approval from the FCC to move its 97.5 FM signal (which became WTHK FM after the format migration) to become a metropolitan Philadelphia radio station, rather than a Trenton station. Nassau sold 97.5 FM WTHK to Greater Media, Inc. in exchange for cash and Greater Media's station WKLB 99.5 FM in Boston. Nassau also received the Boston classical music format of WCRB as part of the transaction, and Nassau migrated this classical format onto 99.5 FM. 97.5 FM Philadelphia became Smooth Jazz WJJZ, a format abandoned on 106.1 by Clear Channel.

Nassau also had sales pending to Access.1 Broadcasting of WVPO, WPLY, WSBG, WWYY, WODE, WEEX, WBYN, WTKZ, and WFKB. In December, 2006, this sale had not been consummated and was cancelled.

On April 27, 2009 Mercatanti announced that a debt-to-equity agreement had been reached with Goldman Sachs giving the latter 85% ownership of the company. Although Nassau would continue to operate the stations, the change of control ended Nassau's grandfathered status regarding how many stations per market it could own. WHXR in the Portland, Maine market and WNNH and WWHQ in the Concord/Lakes Region market of New Hampshire were to be placed in a divestiture trust and sold, in an arrangement similar to the Aloha Station Trust established by Clear Channel and the Last Bastion Station Trust established by Citadel Broadcasting.

On June 30, 2011 Inside Radio reported that Nassau had retained LCT Capital as financial adviser for a restructuring in which Nassau would raise money to reacquire the company from its lenders for $52 million, about 20 percent of the estimated $258.1 million owed. Nassau would sell its New England radio and real estate holdings by the end of 2012 as part of the reacquisition effort.

In September 2011 an involuntary Chapter 7 bankruptcy petition was filed by Nassau's lenders that, if granted, would force the company to sell off its assets. On October 6, 2011, Nassau petitioned the US Bankruptcy court to convert the Chapter 7 petition to Chapter 11 which would permit the stations to continue operating while Nassau reorganized its finances.

On February 9, 2012 Nassau has petitioned the bankruptcy judge to allow them to sell off all of their broadcast assets, including all of its stations. The auction concluded in May 2012 with the stations split between various bidders. Nassau's last remaining station, WPLY in Mount Pocono, Pennsylvania, was deleted by the Federal Communications Commission on March 6, 2014, as the station had not broadcast for over a year; WPLY had left the air on June 27, 2011.

== Former Nassau stations ==
=== Maine ===
==== Portland/Lewiston ====
- WBQQ (99.3 FM) Kennebunkport — Country (now owned by WBIN Media Company)
- WBQW (104.7 FM) Kennebunk - Classical (now owned by Mainestream Media as top 40 station WHTP)
- WFNK (107.5 FM) Lewiston - Classic Hits (now owned by WBIN Media Company)
- WHXR (106.3 FM) Scarborough - Active rock (now owned by WBIN Media Company)
- WLAM (1470 AM) Lewiston - Sports/Oldies (now owned by Bob Bittner as an adult standards station)
- WLVP (870 AM) Gorham - Sports/oldies (now owned by Bob Bittner as an adult standards station)
- WTHT (99.9 FM) Auburn - Country (now owned by WBIN Media Company)
- WXTP (106.7 FM) North Windham — Catholic radio (operated by The Presence Radio Network; had simulcast rock with WHXR until 2010; now owned by The Presence Radio Network outright)

==== Bar Harbor ====
- WBQI (107.7 FM) Bar Harbor — Classical (now owned by Blueberry Broadcasting as classic hits station WBKA)

==== Mid-Coast ====
- WBQX (106.9 FM) Thomaston — Classical (now owned by WBIN Media Company as a classic hits station)
- WBYA (105.5 FM) Islesboro — Classic Hits (now owned by WBIN Media Company as a country station)

=== Maryland ===
==== Frederick ====
- WAFY (103.1 FM) Middletown (now owned by Manning Broadcasting, Inc.)

==== Hagerstown ====
- WARK (1490 AM) Hagerstown (now owned by Manning Broadcasting, Inc.)
- WWEG (106.9 FM) Myersville (now owned by Manning Broadcasting, Inc.)

=== Massachusetts ===
==== Boston ====
- WCRB (99.5 FM) Lowell — Classical (now owned by WGBH Educational Foundation)

==== Cape Cod ====
- WFRQ (101.1 FM) Mashpee — Adult Hits (now owned by Codcomm Inc. as top 40 station WHYA)
- WFQR (93.5 FM) Harwich Port — Adult Hits (now owned by Codcomm Inc.)
- WPXC (102.9 FM) Hyannis — Active Rock (now owned by Codcomm Inc.)

=== New Hampshire ===
==== Lakes Region ====
- WEMJ (1490 AM) Laconia — News/Talk (now owned by WBIN Media Company)
- WLKZ (104.9 FM) Wolfeboro - Classic Rock (now owned by Lakes Media)
- WLNH (98.3 FM) Laconia - Adult Contemporary (now owned by WBIN Media Company as a classic hits station)
- WNHW (93.3 FM) Belmont - Country (now owned by WBIN Media Partners)
- WWHQ (101.5 FM) Meredith - Classic Rock (now owned by Lakes Media as a soft adult contemporary station)

==== Lebanon-Claremont-Hanover ====
- WFYX (96.3 FM) Walpole - Oldies (now owned by Great Eastern Media)
- WHDQ (106.1 FM) Claremont - Classic Rock (now owned by Great Eastern Radio)
- WNHV (910 AM) White River Junction, VT - Sports (now defunct)
- WTSV (1230 AM) Claremont - Sports (now owned by Great Eastern Radio)
- WWOD (104.3 FM) Hartford, VT - Oldies (now owned by Great Eastern Radio as a Burlington-Plattsburgh market station with the call sign WJKS and a country format)
- WXLF (95.3 FM) Hartford, VT - Country (now owned by Binnie Media)
- WZLF (107.1 FM) Bellows Falls, VT - Country (now owned by Binnie Media)

==== Manchester-Nashua-Concord ====
- WFNQ (106.3 FM) Nashua — Adult Contemporary (now owned by WBIN Media Company)
- WJYY (105.5 FM) Concord — Top 40 (now owned by WBIN Media Company)
- WNNH (99.1 FM) Henniker — Adult Contemporary (now owned by WBIN Media Company)
- WWHK (102.3 FM) Concord - Classic Rock (operated under LMA with Capitol Broadcasting from 2005 to August 22, 2008. Never owned by Nassau outright.)

=== New Jersey ===
- WBBO (98.5 FM) Toms River — CHR (now owned by Press Communications)
- WADB (1310 AM) Asbury Park — Standards (now owned by Townsquare Media)
- WCHR (920 AM) Trenton — Religious (now owned by Townsquare Media)
- WCHR-FM (105.7 FM) Toms River — Classic Hits (now owned by Townsquare Media)
- WHCY (106.3 FM) Blairstown — CHR (now owned by Clear Channel [now iHeartMedia, Inc.])
- WJLK (94.3 FM) Asbury Park — Hot AC — (now owned by Townsquare Media)
- WNJE (1040 AM) Flemington — Religious (now owned by Connoisseur Media)
- WNJO/WTHK (94.5 FM until 2005; 97.5 FM 2005–2006) Trenton — Classic Rock (now Sports WPEN, and formerly Smooth Jazz WJJZ, currently owned by Townsquare Media)
- WNNJ (1360 AM) Newton — Standards/Oldies/MOR (sold to Clear Channel in 2001; now owned by Central Biblico of New Jersey as WTOC)
- WNNJ-FM (103.7 FM) Newton — Classic Hits (now owned by iHeartMedia)
- WOBM (1160 AM) Long Branch — Standards (now owned by Townsquare Media)
- WOBM-FM (92.7 FM) Toms River — AC (now owned by Townsquare Media)
- WOJZ (104.9 FM) Egg Harbor — Country 2003, Smooth Jazz 2003-04 (now owned by Townsquare Media as hot AC WSJO)
- WPST (94.5 FM) Trenton — CHR (now owned by Townsquare Media)
- WSUS (102.3 FM) Franklin — AC (now owned by iHeartMedia)
- WWYY (107.1 FM) Belvidere — Rock (Now owned by Connoisseur Media)

=== New York ===
==== Port Jervis ====
(These stations were LMAs and never owned by Nassau outright)

- WDLC (1490 AM) — Oldies (owned by Sunrise and Sports)
- WTSX (96.7 FM) — Oldies (now owned by Sunrise becoming Hot AC/Variety Hits, then Country, and now Variety Hits/Hot AC) this station moved to Pocono PA due to WARW FM move into the NYC market from Connecticut and became Bigfoot Country 96.7.

=== Pennsylvania ===
- WBYN (1160 AM) Lehighton - Religious (now owned by Connoisseur Media)
- WEEX (1230 AM) Easton - ESPN Sports (now owned by Connoisseur Media)
- WFKB (107.5 FM) — Classic Hits (now religious; never owned by Nassau but managed through an LMA)
- WODE-FM (99.9 FM) Easton - Classic Hits (now owned by Connoisseur Media)
- WPEN-FM (97.5 FM) Philadelphia - Sports (now owned by Beasley Media Group)
- WPLY (960 AM) Mount Pocono — Talk (defunct, went silent on June 27, 2011; license canceled on March 6, 2014)
- WSBG (93.5 FM) Stroudsburg - Hot AC (now owned by Seven Mountains Media)
- WTKZ (1320 AM) Allentown - ESPN Sports (now owned by VP Broadcasting)
- WVPO (840 AM) Stroudsburg - Talk (now owned by Seven Mountains Media)

=== Vermont ===
==== Bennington ====
- WTHK (100.7 FM) Wilmington — Classic Rock (now owned by Great Eastern Radio)

==== Montpelier-Barre-Waterbury ====
- WRFK (107.1 FM) Barre — Classic Hits (now owned by Great Eastern Radio)
- WSNO (1450 AM) Barre — Talk (now owned by Great Eastern Radio)
- WWFY (100.9 FM) Berlin — Country (now owned by Great Eastern Radio)

==== Newport ====
- WIKE (1490 AM) Newport — Country (now owned by Vermont Broadcast Associates, Inc.)
- WMOO (92.1 FM) Derby Center — Adult Contemporary (now owned by Vermont Broadcast Associates, Inc.)

==== Rutland ====
- WEXP (101.5 FM) Brandon — Classic Rock (now owned by Radio Vermont Group)
