= WSBG =

Radio station in Stroudsburg, Pennsylvania

- Stroudsburg, Pennsylvania; United States
- Broadcast area: Monroe County
- Frequency: 93.5 MHz
- Branding: 93.5 SBG

Programming
- Format: Hot adult contemporary
- Affiliations: Compass Media Networks

Ownership
- Owner: Seven Mountains Media; (Southern Belle, LLC)
- Sister stations: WPCO; WVPO

History
- First air date: 1964 (as WVPO-FM)
- Former call signs: WVPO-FM (1964–1983)
- Call sign meaning: Stroudsburg

Technical information
- Licensing authority: FCC
- Facility ID: 47424
- Class: A
- ERP: 430 watts
- HAAT: 266 meters (873 ft)
- Transmitter coordinates: 40°56′53.3″N 75°9′36.6″W

Links
- Public license information: Public file; LMS
- Webcast: Listen live
- Website: www.935sbg.com

WSBG (93.5 FM) is a radio station broadcasting a hot adult contemporary format in Stroudsburg, Pennsylvania, United States. The station is currently owned by Seven Mountains Media and its transmitter is located south of the Appalachian trail in Smithfield Township, Pennsylvania. Branded as "93.5 SBG", it features current hits mixed with recurrent hits from the early 1990s to today.

== History ==
The station began operation in 1964 as WVPO-FM. Initially, the station employed an MOR format playing mostly pop standards and simulcast WVPO. Beginning in the late 1960s, WVPO-FM would simulcast WVPO in the morning hours and in the afternoon employing a pop-rock format. This continued until February 1984. Their local owners were known as Keystone Broadcasters.

In 1983, WVPO-FM separated totally from WVPO and began offering a Top 40/CHR format playing current products mixed with big hits from the late 1970s and 1980s. The station added new jingles and liners and also added to its airstaff. The call letters were changed to WSBG. The station at one point became known as "Power 93.5". The station continued to evolve and by the early 1990s, the station played hits of the late 1980s, 1990s, and plenty of new products.

In 1994, WSBG and WVPO were sold to Nassau Broadcasting Partners, but the format remained Top 40 initially. In 1995, though, WSBG began to lean toward alternative rock. In early 1996, the station had become almost entirely modern rock but quickly evolved back to mainstream Top 40/CHR almost as quickly by the summer. The station continued as a Top 40 station until October 1997. At that point, the station quietly segued into a hot adult contemporary format.

In 1998, the station, along with WVPO, was sold to Multicultural Broadcasters but continued to be managed by Nassau. In 1999, WSBG was a Hot A/C station.

On August 25, 2000, Nassau flipped then-sister station WHCY 106.3 (which is now a Clear Channel station) from Country to Top 40. Some of WSBG's staffers moved there. Others remained at WSBG. On that same day, WSBG adopted a new adult rock format modeled after a format known as "Alice" which was being employed by 104.5 in Philadelphia (that station has since changed formats).

In 2001, Nassau acquired Lehigh Valley stations WODE 99.9, 1230 WEEX, and a cash amount from Clear Channel Communications in exchange for New Jersey stations WNNJ, WNNJ-FM, WHCY, WSUS, and the LMA with WDLC and WTSX.

In 2002, Nassau re-acquired full ownership of WVPO and WSBG. WSBG had remained a gold-based Adult rock format focusing on 1970s to 1990s pop rock hits. The most prominent show on the station had been the "Gary In The Morning" show, featuring Gary Smith. On April 11, 2007, Smith was fired for airing a contest based around a racial slur said by Don Imus 2 days earlier on his nationally syndicated radio show.

On May 3, 2007, the "Rockin' Hits" format of WSBG was shut down. The "Lite 107" adult contemporary format of sister station 107.1 WWYY moved to 93.5. WWYY then became known as "The Bone", offering a Hard Rock based classic rock format. 30-year Nassau veteran Chuck Seese currently hosts the SBG Morning Show. Karen Stone handles the mid-day show. Matty Beik mans the afternoon slot from 2-7 pm.

On October 14, 2009, WSBG relaunched itself as "935 SBG, The Pocono's Best Variety" at 2PM. This format consists of newer hits from today along with hotter songs from the 1990s.

The station, along with nine other Nassau stations in New Jersey and Pennsylvania, was purchased at bankruptcy auction by NB Broadcasting in May 2012. NB Broadcasting is controlled by Nassau's creditors — Goldman Sachs, Pluss Enterprises, and P.E. Capital. In November, NB Broadcasting filed a motion to assign its rights to the stations to Connoisseur Media. The sale to Connoisseur Media, at a price of $38.7 million, was consummated on May 29, 2013.

On August 14, 2019, Connoisseur Media agreed to sell WSBG along with sister station WVPO to Seven Mountains Media for $1.1 million. The sale closed on October 31, 2019.

== Gary Smith controversy ==
On April 11, 2007, Gary Smith, host of the "Gary In The Morning" show, was fired for a "joke" that he did on the previous Monday's show. Listeners were to call in with "The Phrase That Pays" to win tickets to a NASCAR promotion at a local club. That phrase was "I'm A Nappy Headed Ho" (in reference to the remarks made by Don Imus on his nationally syndicated radio show).

According to a press release issued by the station, Smith “used the phrase with full knowledge of the reaction to Don Imus’ use of exactly the same phrase just a day earlier, which is the reason he was terminated and not suspended.”

On April 17, 2007, Smith took part in a telephone interview with Howard Stern on "The Howard Stern Show". After Gary gave his account of the incident, Howard urged Nassau Broadcasting to reinstate Smith's job immediately. But Nassau was already planning a move of 107.1 WWYY's format to 93.5, and planned to sign-on a new format on 107.1.
