= Hollywood shootout =

Hollywood shootout could refer to:

- Hollywood Shootout, the syndicated title of Shootout (TV series)
- The North Hollywood shootout, between bank robbers and the LAPD in 1997
- North Hollywood Shootout, the Blues Traveler album released in 2008
