= WNJO =

WNJO may refer to:

- WNJO (FM), a radio station (90.3 FM) licensed to Toms River, New Jersey, United States
- WPST, radio station (94.5 FM) licensed to Trenton, New Jersey, which used the call sign WNJO from 1998 to 2002
