= WYNY =

WYNY may refer to:

- WYNY (AM), a radio station (1450 AM) licensed to serve Milford, Pennsylvania, United States

Former radio stations:

- WXPK, a radio station (107.1 FM) licensed to Briarcliff Manor, New York, United States, which used the WYNY call sign from 1998 to 2003
  - New Country Y-107, the name of a quadcast of stations that included the above radio station
- WKTU, a radio station (103.5 FM) licensed to Lake Success, New York, United States, which used the WYNY call sign from 1988 to 1996
- WQHT, a radio station (97.1 FM) licensed to New York, New York, United States, which used the WYNY call sign from 1977 to 1988
