= WVPO (FM) =

Radio station in Lehman Township, Pennsylvania

Coordinates: 41.2109°N 74.9727°W

- Lehman Township, Pennsylvania; United States
- Broadcast area: Stroudsburg area
- Frequency: 96.7 MHz
- Branding: Bigfoot Country 96.7 & 97.3

Programming
- Format: Country
- Affiliations: Compass Media Networks

Ownership
- Owner: Seven Mountains Media; (Southern Belle, LLC)
- Sister stations: WPCO; WSBG

History
- First air date: October 23, 1970 (as WDLC-FM)
- Former call signs: WDLC-FM (1970–1984); WTSX (1984–2012); WABT (2012–2023)
- Call sign meaning: "Voice of the Poconos" (former slogan for 840 AM)

Technical information
- Licensing authority: FCC
- Facility ID: 53036
- Class: A
- ERP: 5,000 watts
- HAAT: 70 meters (230 ft)
- Translator: 97.3 W247AE (East Stroudsburg)

Links
- Public license information: Public file; LMS
- Webcast: Listen live
- Website: bigfootpoconos.com

WVPO (96.7 MHz) is an FM radio station in Lehman Township, Pennsylvania, United States, known as "Bigfoot Country 96.7 & 97.3". The station is owned by Seven Mountains Media, programming a country music format.

== History ==
This station began operation on October 23, 1970, as WDLC-FM in Port Jervis, New York. The station ran a country music format initially. WDLC-FM, along with WDLC (1490 AM), were owned by Oscar Wein and family. His son Bob Wein along with the rest of the family were active with the station.

By the mid-1970s, the Federal Communications Commission (FCC) relaxed simulcast restrictions between AM and FM radio stations. Because WDLC-FM was automated, they decided to begin simulcasting both stations. WDLC and WDLC-FM, upon simulcasting, continued WDLC AM's middle of the road format from 5 to 10 a.m. as well as from 3 to 7 p.m.; played country music from 10 a.m. to 3 p.m. and 7 p.m. to 9 p.m., and instrumental easy listening music from 9 p.m. to 1 a.m.. On Sundays, the station had many specialty shows.

In 1984 WDLC-FM began separate programming from the AM station, and eventually changed its call sign to WTSX for Tri-State Crossroads. The new station began playing an adult contemporary format. Both WTSX and WDLC did rather well in terms of ratings and profitability through the 1980s, and later that decade, Oscar Wein retired and his son Bob Wein took over operations. (Oscar Wein died on December 18, 2000, at the age of 82.)

From 1994 to 1999, WTSX had some success with its new morning show, "The Morning Thing" with Alan James, but overall it and WDLC began to have financial troubles during the 1990s. As a result, in 1997, half the staff (including WDLC's newly hired morning man and program director) was laid off and WTSX began to automate evenings and overnights. WDLC had automated several years before using a satellite delivered adult standards format. In September 1998, Robert Wein began leasing WDLC and WTSX to Nassau Broadcasting in a local marketing agreement. The airstaff and sales staff stayed, but now became Nassau Broadcasting employees. Alan James left WTSX in 1999 due to differences in philosophy with management over the direction of the morning show, and of WTSX in general.

Nassau changed WTSX to a 1964-1969-based oldies format, mixing in some early 1970s, late 1950s and early 1960s oldies as well. The ratings were low in the Southern Hudson Valley, but decent in the Sussex County radio market. However, in February 2001, Nassau sold the local marketing agreement of WDLC and WTSX to Clear Channel Communications, along with full ownership of WSUS, WNNJ, WNNJ-FM, and WHCY.

Under Clear Channel, the station was modified to a 1964-to-1975-based oldies format, with a small amount of late 1970s and pre-1964 songs. The station began to focus more on the 1970s as most FM oldies stations began to do.

In September 2004, the local marketing agreement with Clear Channel expired, and Bob Wein opted not to renew it. As a result, most of the staff of the station, with the exception of their new morning DJ Robert Oefinger (known on-air simply as "Bob-O"), remained Clear Channel employees, and moved to WNNJ. This made Bob-O the only on-air personality at WTSX.

By this time, Bob Wein had once again assumed operational control of WTSX and WDLC, however, the jingles and advertisers which the station had been using were Clear Channel's, and as a result, the station had no jingles or advertisers for a few days. The oldies format deepened to include the hits of 1955 to 1990. The station was announcing that they were "building a new radio station". By November, another local owner took over operations of the station, while Bob Wein retained ownership. New on-air personalities were added, and jingles and advertisers were finally back. It was thought that WTSX Fox 96.7 would remain an oldies station.

Then, in January 2005, Fox 96.7 dropped most of the pre-1964 oldies. Port Jervis Broadcasting bought the station from Bob Wein. In March 2005, they began a local marketing agreement with WGNY-FM in Newburgh. The two stations combined airstaffs. Each station would have their own local show, and local news was brought back. However, after the local morning show each day, both stations shadowcast, meaning they both had the same announcers after 10 a.m., but played different songs at different times. More 1980s and 1990s music was added as well as some current and recent product. The station were then known as Fox 96.7/Fox 103.1, and began playing an uptempo, gold-based rock, leaning adult contemporary format. Concurrently, WDLC began simulcasting a 1955 to 1972 oldies format with WGNY AM in Newburgh.

In November 2006, WTSX separated from WGNY-FM, and began airing a country music format. Bob-O continued to do the morning show. other daily shows included local personality Mike Coleman's "Coleman Corral", and "Radio Ranch".

On August 2, 2008, WTSX returned to a simulcast of WGNY-FM with local breaks. The combined stations were known as Fox 96.7 and Fox 103.1. Arbitron public ratings of WTSX steadily declined in both the Sussex and Newburgh-Middletown markets after the return of the simulcast.

In 2011, WTSX was required to move its coverage and city of license from Port Jervis to Lehman Township, because of WCTZ (96.7 FM) in Port Chester, New York, moving into the New York City market. The local marketing agreement of Fox 96.7 and Fox 103.1 ended on March 1, 2012, and WTSX began playing classic hits. Bud Williamson’s Digital Radio Broadcasting, owner of WYNY in Milford, converted its local marketing agreement with WDLC and WTSX into a $300,000 purchase from Neversink Broadcasting Company, LLC. On May 24, 2012, the station's license was assigned to Neversink Radio, LLC and the station's call sign was changed to WABT. Greta Latona, a former Marconi Award nominee, was the midday host at the station. In 2022, the station announced a sale to Southern Belle, LLC and Seven Mountains Media of NY LLC.

Seven Mountains Media agreed to purchase WABT and translator W247AE for $400,000 in November 2022. On March 8, 2023, WABT swapped formats with new sister station WVPO (840 AM), becoming "Bigfoot Country 96.7/97.3"; the WVPO call sign also moved to 96.7, with 840 AM and its 103.1 FM translator assuming WABT's classic hits format as WPCO.
