= Jon Price =

Swedish rapper (born 1973)

- Born: September 28, 1973 (age 52)
- Occupations: sports gambler, adviser, entrepreneur, and radio personality

Jon Price (born September 28, 1973) is an American sports gambler, adviser, entrepreneur, and radio personality. Known for placing high-stake sports bets, Price was named by The Comeback as "one of the top 10 most influential people in the sports betting world" in 2022.

== Life and career ==
Jon Price grew up in a middle-class family in the Northeast. He started to sell tips and picks to the public in 2013 via his brand, Sports Information Trader's.

=== Publications ===
Price has been featured in several publications and nationally syndicated radio shows throughout his career. Forbes Magazine did a feature on him about Super Bowl Prop Bets. He has also been featured on KNBR in San Francisco, ESPN Radio, CBS Sports Radio, Westwood One with Zach Gelb and The Gary & Larry Show.

During the 2015-16 College Football Bowl Season, Inc. Magazine did a feature on Price regarding his strategies for wagering in sports, particularly in Bowl Games.

== See also ==
- Sports betting
- Billy Walters
