= WTSX =

WTSX may refer to:

- WTSX-LP, a low-power radio station (104.9 FM) licensed to serve Kokomo, Indiana, United States
- WVPO (FM), a radio station (96.7 FM) licensed to serve Lehman Township, Pennsylvania, United States, which held the call sign WTSX from 1984 to 2012
