= Fade Out: The Calamitous Final Days of MGM =

Fade Out: The Calamitous Final Days of MGM is a 1990 non-fiction book by Peter Bart which covers the history of MGM since 1969, when it was bought by Kirk Kerkorian. Bart was an executive at MGM in 1983 and 1984. The book focuses on the regimes of James T. Aubrey, Daniel Melnick, David Begelman and Frank Yablans.

The accuracy of the book was criticised by Frank Yablans, Jerry Weintraub and Freddie Fields.

It was a best seller and led to Bart receiving an offer to edit Weekly Variety.
