= WAFY =

Hot adult contemporary radio station in Middletown, Maryland

- Middletown, Maryland; United States
- Broadcast area: Central Maryland
- Frequency: 103.1 MHz
- RDS: PI: 5542; PS: Title by Artist on Key 103; RT: Title by Artist Key 103
- Branding: Key 103

Programming
- Language: English
- Format: Hot adult contemporary

Ownership
- Owner: Manning Broadcasting, Inc.
- Sister stations: WARK; WWEG

History
- First air date: May 14, 1990

Technical information
- Licensing authority: FCC
- Facility ID: 3728
- Class: A
- ERP: 1,000 watts
- HAAT: 174 meters (571 ft)
- Transmitter coordinates: 39.418°N 77.501°W

Links
- Public license information: Public file; LMS
- Webcast: Listen live
- Website: www.key103radio.com

WAFY (103.1 FM; "Key 103") is a commercial radio station licensed to Middletown, Maryland, and serving Frederick County. It airs a hot adult contemporary format and is owned by Manning Broadcasting, with studios on Industry Lane in Frederick.

WAFY has an effective radiated power (ERP) of 1,000 watts. The transmitter tower is off Swimming Pool Road at Schley Avenue in Braddock Heights.

== History ==
The station signed on the air on May 14, 1990. It was founded by Barbara Marmet, who had the intention of having a community radio station for Frederick and surrounding towns. The "Key" branding references Frederick native Francis Scott Key, whose poem led to the composition of "The Star Spangled Banner".

Among several applicants for the allocation, the Federal Communications Commission (FCC) gave preference to her because of her local residency and, under an affirmative action program designed to increase minority-owned broadcasters, a woman. This led to a lawsuit by Jerome Lamprecht, one of the competing applicants. In 1992's Lamprecht v. FCC, the D.C. Circuit Court of Appeals held in an opinion written by newly confirmed Supreme Court Justice Clarence Thomas that in the absence of a demonstrable reason, such as encouraging programming diversity, such preference was unconstitutional. Litigation continued until an eventual settlement between Lamprecht and Marmet in 1999.

Marmet sold WAFY to Nassau Broadcasting Partners in 2005. After Nassau went into chapter 11 bankruptcy protection, the station, along with WARK and WWEG in Hagerstown, were purchased by Manning Broadcasting, Inc. in May 2012. The sale was completed on November 1, at a price of $6.4 million.

For much of the early 2000s, WAFY played soft adult contemporary music. On September 16, 2010, at 9 a.m., Key 103 dropped the slogan "Frederick's Continuous Soft Rock" and began a 20th anniversary retrospective show looking back at the history of the station's personalities, music, and activities. This retrospective ended at noon with a launch into its current hot adult contemporary format.
