= KFXN (AM) =

Hmong-language radio station in the Minneapolis–St. Paul metropolitan area

- Minneapolis, Minnesota; United States
- Broadcast area: Minneapolis-St. Paul
- Frequency: 690 kHz
- Branding: Hmong Radio AM 690

Programming
- Language: Hmong language
- Format: World ethnic

Ownership
- Owner: Kongsue Xiong; (Asian American Broadcasting, LLC)

History
- First air date: April 5, 1962
- Former call signs: KTCR (1962–1984); KTCJ (1984–1997); KXBR (1997–1998)
- Call sign meaning: derived from former sister station KFAN

Technical information
- Licensing authority: FCC
- Facility ID: 10141
- Class: D
- Power: 1,700 watts (day); 5 watts (night)
- Transmitter coordinates: 45°1′23.9″N 93°22′53.8″W

Links
- Public license information: Public file; LMS
- Website: hmongradioam690.com

KFXN (690 AM; "Hmong Radio AM 690") is a radio station licensed to Minneapolis, Minnesota, serving the Twin Cities area. The station is owned by Kongsue Xiong, through licensee Asian American Broadcasting, LLC. It broadcasts an ethnic-based format catering to the local Hmong-American population.

KFXN is essentially a daytime-only station, broadcasting at 1,700 watts, with five watts nighttime power for very limited night coverage. This is to protect CKGM in Montreal, Quebec, Canada. The transmitter and single tower antenna is located in New Hope on Winnetka Avenue north of 36th Avenue. This has been the only transmitter location for the station since it signed on the air. In August 2009, KTTB (96.3 FM) relocated its transmission facilities from Watertown to the KFXN site.

== History ==
The station signed on in 1962 with the call sign KTCR, and a country music format. In 1968, new owner Al Tedesco purchased a companion FM station, KWFM, renaming it KTCR-FM.

In 1983, both stations were sold to John and Kathleen Parker, who gave the stations a makeover. The FM was changed to an adult album alternative/new-age music format as KTCZ-FM, and KTCR became jazz as KTCJ to complement "Cities 97". The AM's jazz format lasted several years and the station was among the early market adopters of AM stereo, but eventually ceded to a simulcast with KTCZ-FM. On April 17, 1997, KTCJ, the sole remaining AM simulcasting an FM in the market, switched to classic country music. The callsign was changed to KXBR ("The Bear") that December.

Former Score 690 logo

In December 1998, KXBR dropped country and became KFXN, a complement to sports-formatted sister KFAN. The station was branded as "Score 690", and featured mostly syndicated shows from Fox Sports Radio and Sporting News Radio. KFXN also carried Jim Rome's nationally syndicated program, and repeats of KFAN's local shows.

Previous logo

On July 21, 2010, Clear Channel Communications announced it would donate KFXN, along with WTOC in Newton, through the Minority Media and Telecommunications Council (MMTC)-Clear Channel Ownership Diversity Initiative. In September 2011, the station switched to an ethnic-based format catering to the local Hmong-American community. Clear Channel would continue "The Score" on the HD2 subchannel of KTCZ-FM. KFXN was sold by MMTC to Kongsue Xiong and Xeng Xiong's Asian American Broadcasting, LLC in a transaction that was consummated on May 5, 2014. The purchase price for the station was $255,000. Kongsue Xiong bought full control of the station for $135,000 in 2018.

Originally the station had used a three-tower antenna array to shape the then-500 watt signal to protect the Canadian clear channel station in Montreal (initially CBF; later CINF and CKGM) as well as KUSD in Vermillion, South Dakota. In 2020 the center tower of the KFXN array collapsed, severing the transmission lines feeding the other two towers. The station operated under special temporary authority from the Federal Communications Commission to operate non directional from the east tower at a reduced power of 120 watts. Engineering studies conducted after the collapse demonstrated that the station could increase power using a non-directional tower while protecting the signal of CKGM.
