= WHCY =

- Blairstown, New Jersey; United States
- Broadcast area: Sussex, Warren, and Morris County, New Jersey, and East Stroudsburg, Pennsylvania
- Frequency: 106.3 MHz
- Branding: 106.3 The Bear

Programming
- Format: Country
- Affiliations: Premiere Networks

Ownership
- Owner: iHeartMedia, Inc.; (iHM Licenses, LLC)
- Sister stations: WSUS, WNNJ

History
- First air date: October 1973
- Former call signs: WFMV (1973–1988)
- Call sign meaning: "Hot Country"

Technical information
- Licensing authority: FCC
- Facility ID: 11984
- Class: A
- ERP: 430 watts
- HAAT: 262 meters (860 ft)
- Transmitter coordinates: 41°02′53″N 74°58′21″W

Links
- Public license information: Public file; LMS
- Webcast: Listen live (via iHeartRadio)
- Website: 1063thebear.iheart.com

WHCY (106.3 FM, "106.3 The Bear") is a commercial radio station licensed to Blairstown, New Jersey, United States, and serving the Sussex, Warren, and Morris County areas of North Jersey plus East Stroudsburg, Pennsylvania. Owned by iHeartMedia, it airs a country music format. The studios are located at 45 Ed Mitchell Avenue in Franklin, New Jersey; the transmitter is situated off Millbrook Road in Hardwick Township, New Jersey.

== History ==
=== Oldies ===
The station signed on the air in October 1973. The call sign was WFMV and the format was oldies. The studios were in the former DL&W Blairstown railroad station. From 1973 to 1977, Warren Broadcasting Corporation owned WFMV, along with WCRV 1580 AM in Washington, New Jersey, now silent.

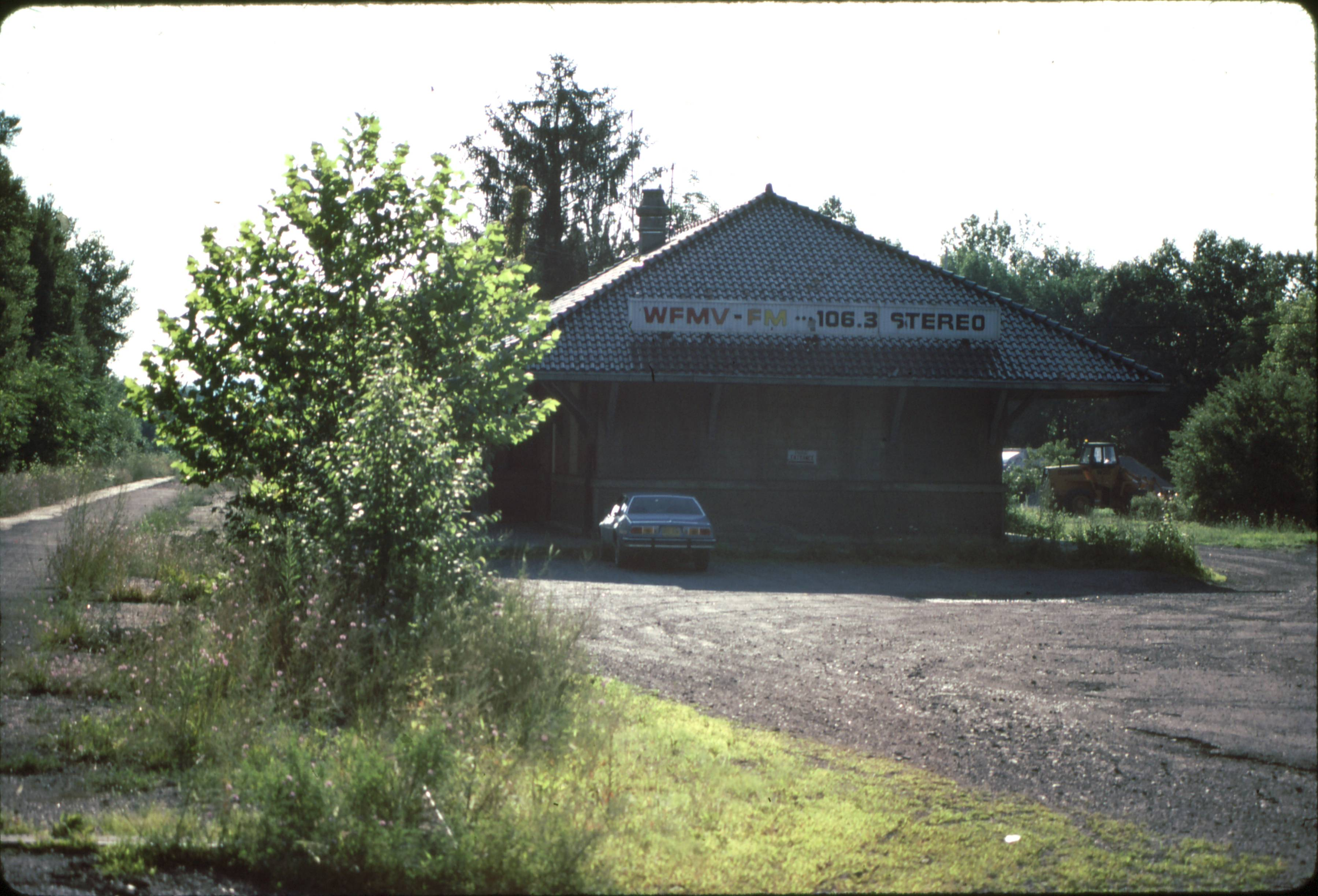
Studios in 1988, in a former railway station.

The station tagline was "Golden FMV," and featured DJs Sy Marsh, Chucky B, Wayne Scott, Scott O'Connor, Tommy John, Rod Baumann, Dave Garey, Tony Dee, Geoffrey Kevin Doll, Bill Reilly, and others. WFMV also used the moniker "Tri-State Goldmine," since its signal banged into a sliver of New York State, although the Warren County/Poconos NJ-PA region was the station's primary target. The music followed a 50's, 60's, 70's, and "Future Gold" four-category rotation. FMV had a generous list of Future Gold songs, jumping on records such as "Emma" by Hot Chocolate, "L-O-V-E" by Al Green, John Lennon's "#9 Dream," Chaka Khan's "Once You Get Started," Ben E. King's "Supernatural Thing," Sammy John's "Chevy Van," Sugarloaf's "Don't Call Us, We'll Call You" and War's "Low Rider." Even if listeners weren't into the oldies, which weren't that old then, Golden FMV's current song category rivaled the playlists of any New York, Philly, or Allentown top forty station at the time.

WFMV became very promotions-oriented during this period, tying in with venues such as The Still in Tranquility for contests like "Kissable Lips," in which female listeners were invited to send in a lipstick imprint of their lips for a chance to win a blind date with an 'FMV disc jockey, dinner and drinks included. The station was unique among suburban/smaller market stations for being extremely personality-driven, with GM Chuck Bettyeman, to his credit, holding regular staff meetings at which the disc jockeys – mostly on their first or second jobs in radio – were encouraged to have fun on the air, add humor, and be themselves. As Chucky put it, "You can be as good as anyone on WABC if you want to."

In January 1977, Kurt Gebauer, who had done mornings at the station in 1975 as Scott O'Connor before going to co-owned WCRV as Sales/Operations Manager, was hired as VP/General Manager and the station became "FM 106", retaining the oldies format, but updating to a more 1960s-centric sound. The DJs at the time were Mark Austin, Steve Altemus, Tommy John, George Fuller, Rod Baumann, Ron Kaplan, Bill Chamberlain, Patty Martene and others.

=== Top 40/Rock and Hot AC ===
In 1980, with Russ Long as GM, the station switched to a Top 40/Rock hybrid format. WFMV was sold to Clearview Broadcasting in 1981. In 1984, after Russ Long left for WVPO and WSBG, under a new GM Bill Dimmick, WFMV evolved into more of a Hot Adult Contemporary format. Ratings were always mediocre to below average. At the time advertising tended to be from the Stroudsburg and Pocono area. With Stroudsburg-based WSBG switching to a similar format in 1984, WFMV lost more advertising but survived. In 1986, Barbara Perry took over as GM.

In the summer of 1988, due to environmental issues and drought, the station was forced to leave the air from 10 a.m. to 6 p.m. daily for several summer months. Eventually, that problem was resolved. By then, the station format was mostly gold-based adult contemporary. On-air staff members included Rockin' T Tom Rocco, Allen Garrett, Paul Maason, Kevin Roe, Doctor J, Corey Hansen, Chris Maget, Mark West, Gerrie Burke, Paul LaFever, Chris DeBello, Jo-Ann (Holden) George and Sean O'Casey, and Bill Reilly (Sunday mornings).

In the spring of 1990, WFMV dropped this format and returned to oldies, with hits primarily from 1964 to 1984, and occasionally stretching the year range. The tagline was "Classic Hits 106." In the fall of 1990, the station changed the range to music from 1955 to about 1983. Sue Lafever took over as GM in 1991. Ratings were very low and the station began to lose money.

=== Country Music ===
In the fall of 1992 the owners hired a new general manager, Rick Musselman who decided several weeks later to fill a hole in the market. Since May 1988, Sussex and Warren counties had no country music station but could get New York City-based WYNY 97.1. Later that year, WYNY moved its frequencies to 103.5, which could not be heard in WFMV's listening area due to 103.7 WNNJ-FM's broadcasting on nearly the same frequency (103.7). Country music fans were without any way to receive country music in the area until 1990 when WRWD in the Hudson Valley signed on. Still reception for that station was good in Sussex County but poor in Warren County. Saturday, October 24, at 8 p.m., WFMV Classic Hits 106 ended with 99 Luftballons by Nena. American Country Countdown came on next, which WFMV had already been running since 1991 at 8:00 PM Sundays. At midnight the station became "WHCY Hot Country 106.3". WHCY stood for Hot Country which are still the call letters today. The country format immediately made FM 106.3 profitable and the station received mediocre to above average ratings over the years.

The station had live morning and afternoon drive disc jockeys during the week and middays on Saturdays and Sundays. The rest of the time it ran Jones Satellite-delivered Country programming. In the spring of 1994 the station dropped satellite programming for a live local presentation. Airstaff included Bob O., Rich Wilson, Jo-Ann Holden, Christa Robinson, Doctor J, Tony Lawrence, Matt Black, Frankie West- Frank Tammera, Tom Rocco, Biii E Dow, Doug Hall, Dave The Rave, Johnny Randolph, and others. Paul LeFevre continued to do voiceovers.

In March 1996, the station was sold to Nassau Broadcasting. A few people, including Bob O, exited, but most of the staff stayed on and the country format continued. More on-air changes were made in 1997 with the addition of Rod Bauman as middays and program director. Matt Black, Doctor J, and Tony Lawrence would exit at this point. Chris Debello and Simon Knight would also arrive on staff.

Ratings always had huge rises and falls over the years on this station. While ratings were always decent there was concern about the long-term viability of the country format. There were two other stations competing locally. A station with an automated country format, 107.1 FM (WRNJ-FM), signed on shortly after WHCY adopted the Hot Country format in 1992. WRNJ had low ratings, but still this was taking from WHCY. Then, in the summer of 1997, WLEV on 96.1 FM in the nearby Lehigh Valley, became known as Cat Country with the WCTO calls. WLEV's calls moved to the other Adult Contemporary station in that market on 100.7 FM. An FM country station in the Lehigh Valley was speculated to adversely affect WHCY. Nassau toyed with the ideas of a rock format or all news format in the fall of 1997. At the end of the year, WHCY opted to keep the country format, but using more syndication and automation to cut costs.

In 1998 the station became automated part-time and live part-time with satellite programming in the evenings. The station would later that year replace Rich Wilson with former WYNY airstaff member Frank Bruno for mornings along with longtime air staff member Jo-Ann George, and the format continued for a couple more years with moderate success.

=== Return to Top 40 ===
On August 25, 2000, WHCY switched to a straight Contemporary Hit Radio format. The Hot Country airstaff was spread to other Nassau radio stations while the new airstaff moved to WHCY from several other Nassau stations. The station tagline was "Max 106.3, Today's Hit Music"; the first song on "Max" was "It's Gonna Be Me" by 'N Sync. The It featured Chaz and Kara in the Morning. Jo-Ann George returned in the fall of 2001, replacing Kara. The station was automated on overnights only initially. Other staffers included Matt Sneed, Mark Myles, Trish Davis, Jason Barsky (initially program director), Kyle D., and Kenny Hoyt of Channel X and others.

Programming was a blend of Rock, Adult Contemporary Crossovers, Dance music, R&B, and a limited amount of Rap. Ratings became slightly more consistent. Nassau then sold the station along with 3 other stations and 2 local marketing agreement deals to Clear Channel Communications (now iHeartMedia) in exchange for cash plus WODE-FM and WEEX in the Lehigh Valley in the winter of 2001. Matt Sneed would stay with Nassau and go to WPST. Jason Barsky stayed with Clear Channel as PD and eventually Mornings in Harrisburg, PA and is currently at KDND in Sacramento, CA doing Mornings with the same team.

Under Clear Channel, the station changed only slightly initially. In 2002 the station began to lean younger and play more Rap and R & B product. At that point the airstaff gradually changed and the station gradually began automating more timeslots during the day. "Borasio" moved into the afternoon slot and Mark Myles exited. Kyle continued with the station at night assisting "Borasio" with the station (leaving in 2004 to head to WBHT.) In January 2003, they began simulcasting Z100's Elvis Duran and the Morning Zoo and made a few more airstaff changes. Until the summer of 2004 Max 106.3 was playing a large amount of rap along with a lot of alternative rock and R & B material. One of the large contributors to the alternative rock portion of the programming during 2003 was the Channel X program, originally created and hosted by "Borasio", a host named "Uncle Kenny" (Hoyt-singer for a local metal band named Crushpile with no known former radio experience) was recruited. This name, however, was used only once and "Kenny" was the on-air name to be used during the short-lived period of the program (January 2003-September 2003). The original time slot for the program was 10pm to midnight. Due to high demand, the program was extended to 9 pm. Within the 9 months of the program's existence, it peaked at an astounding 37 percent market share (Arbitron 2003). Many attribute the show's success to a combination of Kenny's antics and the musical mix (which ranged from modern-day rock such as Linkin Park to old thrash bands like Anthrax and Slayer). Kenny's approach was far different from the cardboard cut-out standard of today's commercial radio. The entire 3-hour show was done live with no preparation, additional writers or hosts. Although fictitious "record label executives" had been known to drop by the station for "exclusive interviews". Bizarre on-air comments, stories, blank-outs, spasms, sound effects and more were not uncommon for the program. Despite the success of this program and others, since 2002 advertising was becoming a tough sell because the format leaned too young.

As a result, Max 106.3 dropped all the Rap and R&B product, the Channel X program, added more Pop Rock from the 1990s, and became an Adult CHR format. They use the phrase "90s and Now". The station was heavily automated as well. On Monday, July 28, 2008, Max 106.3 dropped all local operations in favor of "Today's Best Hits" from ABC Radio. Friday, December 19, 2008, was the last day Elvis Duran and the Morning Show was aired on WHCY. In 2009, ABC Radio's format was dropped and Clear Channel's Premium Choice CHR format was picked up with Valentine In The Morning. In 2010, the station again was airing Elvis Duran and The Morning Show.

=== Return to Country ===
On December 1, 2022, at midnight, after playing "Boulevard of Broken Dreams" by Green Day, WHCY flipped back to country as "106.3 The Bear." The first song on "The Bear" was "Son of a Sinner" by Jelly Roll. It soon picked up the syndicated Bobby Bones Show for mornings.
