= WGNY (AM) =

- Newburgh, New York; United States
- Broadcast area: Orange, Dutchess, Ulster and Putnam Counties
- Frequency: 1220 kHz
- Branding: Fox Sports 1220/94.5

Programming
- Format: Sports
- Affiliations: Fox Sports Radio

Ownership
- Owner: Sunrise Broadcasting Corporation
- Sister stations: WGNY-FM, WJGK

History
- First air date: February 25, 1933

Technical information
- Licensing authority: FCC
- Facility ID: 63942
- Class: D
- Power: 10,000 watts (day); 180 watts (night)
- Transmitter coordinates: 41°31′53″N 74°6′48″W
- Translator: 94.5 W233BM (Beacon)
- Repeater: (103.1-2) WJGK-HD2 (Newburgh)

Links
- Public license information: Public file; LMS
- Website: wgny.net

WGNY (1220 AM) is a commercial radio station licensed to Newburgh, New York, United States. It serves the Hudson Valley counties of Orange, Dutchess, Ulster, and Putnam. Owned by the Sunrise Broadcasting Corporation, it broadcasts a sports talk format with studios in New Windsor.

WGNY's transmitter is on Rock Cut Road in Orange Lake. Programming is also heard on 250-watt FM translator W233BM at 94.5 MHz in Beacon.

== History ==
=== Early years ===
Original WGNY logo, circa 1935

WGNY signed on as the Hudson Valley's first permanent radio station on February 25, 1933. Newburgh briefly had a radio station in the early 1920s, using the call sign WCAB, but it was off the air within a few years. WGNY was owned by wealthy real estate developer Robert Wilson Goelet. Goelet built his estate, Glenmere Mansion, in the town of Chester, New York, in 1911. In 1932, he decided to create a radio station that would broadcast from his estate's grounds. (Goelet wanted the call letters WCNY, for "Chester, New York", but as they were already taken, he settled for WGNY to stand for Goelet and Glenmere.)

In 1937, WGNY moved its operations to 161 Broadway in Newburgh. The following year, Goelet sold the station to Merritt C. Speidel and the WGNY Broadcasting Company. Originally powered at 100 watts, WGNY upped its output to 250 watts in 1940 (and eventually 10,000 watts in the 1970s). Billing itself as "The Only Radio Station Between Albany and New York City", WGNY would have Orange County, New York, to itself until Middletown's WALL signed on in 1942. During the 1940s and 50s, WGNY had satellite studios in Middletown and Poughkeepsie.

In 1952, WGNY switched its news affiliation from United Press to the Associated Press (AP). Speidel retired and was replaced as president by George W. Bingham. In 1953, a third station in Orange County signed on, WDLC in Port Jervis But WGNY's listening dominance in the county captured over half the audience as late as the mid-1950s.

More changes came in 1958, when WGNY Broadcasting sold out to Orange County Broadcasting, Inc. The studios were moved to Little Britain Road in New Windsor, where they remain to this day.

=== WGNY-FM ===
In the fall of 1966, FM radio came to Orange County, with WFMN ("FM Newburgh") reaching the air on October 29, followed by Middletown's WALL-FM on November 11. WFMN, owned by brothers Wilbur and Donald Nelson, broadcast at 103.1 MHz and moved into 104 Broadway in Newburgh—just down the street from the old WGNY studios. WFMN and WGNY remained competitors until 1974, when WGNY bought out Stereo Newburgh, Inc. (which had bought WFMN the previous year).

WFMN changed its call sign to WGNY-FM in 1985, then to WJGK in 2010. Starting on February 26, 2011, a new WGNY-FM in Rosendale, New York, began duplicating WGNY's AM signal on 98.9 MHz. Meanwhile, translator W231BP in Chester (WGNY's original location) began carrying WJGK's programming at 94.1 FM.

=== 1960s - 1990s ===
In 1968, Hudson Horizons (Kenneth Cowan, president) acquired WGNY; the following year, the station's lock on Orange County was loosened with the signing-on of WTBQ in Warwick, New York.

In 1987, WGNY-AM-FM Newburgh was purchased from Philip A. Newman by Kelly Guglielmi, who also owned LPTV in Ventner, NJ. Guglielmi was one of dozens of individuals and corporations who submitted letters to the FCC on behalf of WGNY regarding the "Amendment of Part 73 of the Rules to provide for an additional FM ) station class (Class C3) and to increase the maximum transmitting power for Class A FM stations)."

In June 1990, it was reported by the M Street Journal that WGNY had been transferred from Kelly Guglielmi to CVC Capital Corp.

In the 1990s, WGNY sought a new transmitter site and a change to 1200 kHz, which would have improved WGNY's signal. The FCC turned down the frequency change, and the Town of New Windsor nixed the new site.

=== 21st century and WDLC simulcast ===
In recent years, WGNY has switched back and forth between oldies and sports. In March 2005, WGNY-AM-FM began a local marketing agreement (LMA) with Port Jervis' WDLC and WTSX, with the four stations combining air staffs. WGNY began simulcasting a 1955-72 Oldies format with WDLC until January 2007, when WDLC dropped the oldies format in favor of a sports talk format from ESPN Radio. In February 2009, WDLC returned to the WGNY simulcast.

In 2013–14, WGNY saw three format changes in a little over twelve months. First, on April 3, 2013, the station switched back to ESPN Radio. A dispute with the all-sports chain led WGNY to switch back to oldies (simulcasting WGNY-FM) on March 17, 2014. Less than a month later, on April 16, 2014, WGNY re-joined ESPN.

In February 2017, WGNY switched to a country music format simulcasting sister station 103.1 WJGK HD-2 as "Today's Best Country: Fox Country 1220 and Fox Country 103.1 HD2."

Previous logo

Sometime in August 2017, WGNY switched back to an Oldies format, simulcasting sister station 98.9 WGNY-FM, as "Oldies 98.9/105.3/1220".

Sometime in October 2024, WGNY switched to a news/talk/sports format and also switched its translator from W287CY Newburgh to W233BM Beacon.

On September 2, 2025, WGNY changed their format from news/talk/sports to sports talk, branded as "Fox Sports 1220/94.5", with programming from Fox Sports Radio.
