= WNJE =

Radio station in Trenton, New Jersey

- Trenton, New Jersey; United States
- Broadcast area: Mercer County, New Jersey; Bucks County, Pennsylvania
- Frequency: 920 kHz
- Branding: La Raza 98.5FM Y 920AM

Programming
- Format: Regional Mexican

Ownership
- Owner: The Voice Radio Network; (The Voice Radio New Jersey, LLC)
- Sister stations: WIFI

History
- First air date: 1942
- Former call signs: WTTM (1942–1998); WCHR (1998–2002); WPHY (2002–2008); WNJE (2008); WCHR (2008–2013)
- Call sign meaning: "New Jersey ESPN" (former format)

Technical information
- Licensing authority: FCC
- Facility ID: 25011
- Class: B
- Power: 1,400 watts (day); 1,000 watts (night)
- Translator: 98.5 W253DG (Trenton)

Links
- Public license information: Public file; LMS
- Webcast: Listen live

WNJE (920 AM) is a radio station in Trenton, New Jersey. The station is owned by The Voice Radio Network. It carries a regional Mexican format, "La Raza 98.5", which is also heard on FM translator W253DG (98.5).

== History ==
The station signed on the air as WTTM in 1942. The call sign was derived from a variation of the town slogan of "Trenton Makes, the World Takes". It was an affiliate of the NBC Red Network in its early years, eventually shifting to the Mutual Broadcasting System. The station carried varied programming for many years, typically airing general popular music during weekday daytime hours, with Top 40 or rhythm and blues on weeknights and blocks of ethnic programming on weekends. The basic format changed to Top 40 in the late 1970s, followed by country for much of the 1980s and talk in the 1990s.

The WCHR call letters and religious format originated on WTTM's sister station at 94.5 FM in 1969 and remained there for nearly 30 years. After Nassau Broadcasting Partners acquired WCHR, it decided that the powerful FM station had more profit potential as a secular broadcaster, and moved the WCHR call sign and programming to the former WTTM on 920 AM. The switch began with a period of simulcasting that started in November 1997; by the end of February 1998 WCHR was heard on AM only.

The WTTM call sign was subsequently used on a co-owned expanded band AM station licensed to Princeton, which broadcast a sports format with programming from ESPN Radio. In September 2002 the "new" WTTM switched to an Asian format, the WCHR programming and call sign moved to 1040 AM in Flemington, New Jersey, and the ESPN programming moved to 920, which adopted the call letters WPHY. Network programming on "920 ESPN" was supplemented with local shows targeting the Philadelphia market, such as Philly Sports Live hosted by Dan Schwartzman and the Reggie Brown (NFL wide receiver) Show. The station carried play-by-play of the Philadelphia Phillies and some Philadelphia college teams. However, WPHY's signal was inferior in much of the Philadelphia market, limiting the station's impact.

On January 7, 2008, WPHY dropped the sports format and returned to WCHR's religious programming as the 1040 facility was converted into WNJE, a simulcast of ESPN Radio's New York City station, WEPN.

The station, along with nine other Nassau stations in New Jersey and Pennsylvania, was purchased at bankruptcy auction by NB Broadcasting in May 2012. NB Broadcasting was controlled by Nassau's creditors — Goldman Sachs, Pluss Enterprises, and P.E. Capital. In November, NB Broadcasting filed a motion to assign its rights to the stations to Connoisseur Media. On December 3, 2012, WCHR began simulcasting its religious programming on WNJE (1040 AM). The sale to Connoisseur Media, at a price of $38.7 million, was consummated on May 29, 2013.

On November 1, 2013, the format of 920 was changed to talk radio as "920 The Voice", featuring Premiere Radio Networks' Glenn Beck, the syndicated Dave Ramsey show, America Now with Andy Dean and programming from Fox Sports Radio. Christian teaching programming continued to air on 1040, with the two stations swapping call signs.

Logo as "920 The Jersey"

Early in January 2016, WNJE flipped formats to sports talk as "920 The Jersey", carrying much of the program lineup of Fox Sports Radio. The station had been carrying Fox Sports Radio programming in the late night and overnight time periods. From 4-6 p.m. weekdays, WNJE featured the Zach Gelb Show with host Zach Gelb a show that discusses local sports such as the New York and Philadelphia teams. WNJE featured paid programming from 6 to 8 p.m. daily and on weekends, with much of the same paid programming carried over from its time as 920 The Voice.

Effective July 2, 2018, Connoisseur Media sold WNJE and sister stations WCHR and WPST to Townsquare Media for $17.3 million.

On September 1, 2020, WNJE rebranded as "920 ESPN New Jersey" and switched affiliations from Fox Sports Radio to ESPN Radio. In December 2023, Townsquare Media ended broadcasting on WNJE, along with WFNT in Flint, Michigan.

Townsquare Media agreed to sell WNJE to The Voice Radio for $133,333 in 2024. WNJE resumed broadcasting on August 30, 2024; The Voice Radio would use the station to launch a Regional Mexican format, branded as "La Raza 98.5" and simulcast on FM translator W253DG (98.5 FM). W253DG had previously simulcast WIFI, The Voice Radio's other Trenton-area station.

== Translator ==
| Call sign | Frequency | City of license | FID | ERP (W) | HAAT | Class | Transmitter coordinates | FCC info |
|---|---|---|---|---|---|---|---|---|
| W253DG | 98.5 FM | Trenton, New Jersey | 85965 | 180 | 42 m (138 ft) | D | 40°11′21.8″N 74°50′47.6″W | LMS |
