= WARK (AM) =

Coordinates: 39°37′36″N 77°42′40″W

- Hagerstown, Maryland; United States
- Broadcast area: Hagerstown metropolitan area
- Frequency: 1490 kHz
- Branding: 98.9 FM & AM 1490 WARK

Programming
- Format: News/talk
- Affiliations: Baltimore Orioles; Baltimore Ravens; Fox News Radio; Genesis Communications Network; Maryland Terrapins; Premiere Networks; Salem Radio Network; Westwood One

Ownership
- Owner: Manning Broadcasting, Inc.
- Sister stations: WWEG; WAFY

History
- First air date: July 20, 1947

Technical information
- Licensing authority: FCC
- Facility ID: 39807
- Class: C
- Power: 1,000 watts (unlimited)
- Translators: 98.9 W255CP (Hagerstown); 106.3 W292FR (Frederick)
- Repeater: 106.9 WWEG-HD4 (Myersville)

Links
- Public license information: Public file; LMS
- Website: www.989wark.com

WARK (1490 kHz) is an commercial AM radio station located in Hagerstown, Maryland, it features a news/talk radio format including syndicated shows with Mike Gallagher, Sean Hannity, and Mark Levin. The station also carries sporting events for the Baltimore Orioles, Baltimore Ravens, and Maryland Terrapins.

== Ownership ==
WARK is owned by Manning Broadcasting, Inc. WARK broadcasts an FM translator (W255CP) on 98.9 MHz (250 watts @ 341 feet on the WARK tower). WARK is also simulcast on WWEG HD4.

== History ==
The station signed on the air on July 20, 1947.

During the 1960s and 1970s, while owned by Washington DC–based Rau Radio, WARK was a primary source for top 40 music in Hagerstown. Around 1977, WARK adjusted its format to "Adult Rock" (an early form of the "adult contemporary" format) and took on the 15ARK moniker. This lasted until February 1981, when they became Skyline Radio, a mixed talk/music format. It failed within three months; the station was again playing Adult Rock on 15ARK as of May 1981, and made a last foray into a broader Top 40 format with "The Ark" in early/mid-1982. In August 1982, the station changed format again to the Music of Your Life syndicated format. This lasted until sometime in the mid 2000s, when they became a full-time talk radio station. In October 1982, Rau Radio sold WARK to Manning Broadcasting; in 2005, the station was acquired by Nassau Broadcasting Partners.

After Nassau went into chapter 11 bankruptcy protection, WARK and WWEG, along with WAFY in Frederick, were purchased by Manning Broadcasting in May 2012, with the sale being completed on November 1, 2012, at a price of $6.4 million. Manning's repurchase of WARK and WWEG followed a lawsuit against Nassau over missed payments.
