= WPLY (Mount Pocono, Pennsylvania) =

Mount Pocono, Pennsylvania; United States
- Broadcast area: Stroudsburg, Pennsylvania
- Frequency: 960 kHz

Programming
- Format: Defunct (was News/Talk)

Ownership
- Owner: Nassau Broadcasting Partners; (Nassau Broadcasting II, LLC)

History
- First air date: March 1981; 44 years ago
- Last air date: June 27, 2011; 14 years ago
- Former call signs: WPCN (1980–1992); WPMR (1992–1996); WILT (1996–2005)

Technical information
- Facility ID: 67060
- Class: D
- Power: 1,000 watts (day); 24 watts (night)
- Transmitter coordinates: 41°4′41″N 75°23′33″W

WPLY (960 AM) was a radio station licensed to serve Mount Pocono, Pennsylvania, United States. It was owned by Nassau Broadcasting Partners.

It broadcast a news/talk radio format, simulcasting with WVPO (840 AM) in Stroudsburg, Pennsylvania.

== History ==
The station originally signed on in April 1981 as WPCN. The locally owned community station was notably innovative at the time for installing serial #1 of the Continental Model 314R1 PWM transmitter, which ushered in an era of enhanced audio fidelity and efficient, power-saving operation. (It has since been replaced with a Harris Gates One.) The four towers, employing elevated feeds, were guyed with non-conductive Phillystran cable, also innovative at the time.

It was assigned the WPLY call letters by the Federal Communications Commission on March 10, 2005.

In January 2012, the Federal Communications Commission issued a notice of apparent liability and proposed a $17,000 fine against Nassau Broadcasting II, stating WPLY "willfully and repeatedly violated" FCC regulations. It stemmed from a random inspection at WPLY's facilities in March 2010, when it was discovered the station had been transmitting from only one of its four antennas at greatly reduced power (250 watts) without receiving authorization, and had been doing so since Nassau purchased the station in 2000. FCC regulations require that stations unable to operate at full power must apply for a temporary authorization to operate at reduced power, which WPLY did only after the 2010 inspection, claiming that the station's antenna array was "severely deteriorated" and in need of extensive repairs.

The notice also stated that WPLY did not maintain an FCC-required public file, and that station personnel claimed they had never kept such a file.

WPLY left the air June 27, 2011 to determine if its antenna system needed to be repaired or replaced. It never resumed broadcasting, and on March 6, 2014 its license was canceled for failure to broadcast for a year.

The towers were dismantled and removed in early 2019, and the site, at the intersection of Interstates 380 and 80, has remained vacant.
