= WCHR (AM) =

- Transmitter towers in Kingwood Township
- Flemington, New Jersey; United States
- Broadcast area: Central New Jersey; Eastern Pennsylvania
- Frequency: 1040 kHz
- Branding: WCHR 1040 AM

Programming
- Format: Christian talk and teaching

Ownership
- Owner: Townsquare Media; (Townsquare License, LLC)
- Sister stations: WKXW; WPST

History
- First air date: 1998
- Former call signs: WJHR (1987–2002); WCHR (2002–2008); WNJE (2008–2013)

Technical information
- Licensing authority: FCC
- Facility ID: 28130
- Class: B
- Power: 15,000 watts (day); 7,500 watts (critical hours); 1,500 watts (night)
- Transmitter coordinates: 40°30′18.4″N 74°58′34.6″W

Links
- Public license information: Public file; LMS
- Webcast: Listen live
- Website: wchram.com

WCHR (1040 kHz) is a commercial radio station licensed to Flemington, New Jersey, and serving Central New Jersey and Eastern Pennsylvania. It airs a Christian radio format and is owned and operated by Townsquare Media, with studios and offices in Ewing, New Jersey.

By day, WCHR is powered at 15,000 watts. At night it reduces its power to 1,500 watts. AM 1040 is a clear channel frequency reserved for Class A station WHO in Des Moines so WCHR must avoid interference. It uses directional antenna with a three-tower array by day and four towers at night. During critical hours it broadcasts at 7,500 watts. The transmitter is off Locktown Road in Kingwood, New Jersey.

== History ==
=== Jersey Hometown Radio ===
The station signed on in 1998. Originally its call sign was WJHR ("Jersey Hometown Radio") with an adult contemporary format. In February 1998, the station began broadcasting in AM stereo using the C-QUAM system.

In December 1998, the station changed its format to contemporary hit radio (Top 40). WJHR briefly broadcast a talk radio format called "Chat Radio" on May 3, 1999, and the station turned off the AM stereo system. It later had short stints as a business talk station and a sports radio station affiliated with ESPN Radio before adopting the call sign and religious format of WCHR, which had been operating on 920 AM in Trenton, in 2002.

=== Sports station ===
On January 3, 2008, Nassau Broadcasting Partners announced that 1040 AM would drop the religious format and switch to a full-time simulcast of New York City's ESPN Radio station WEPN. Nassau moved the religious programming and the WCHR call sign back to 920, which had been broadcasting as a Philadelphia-oriented ESPN Radio affiliate under the call letters WPHY. On February 5, 2008, the station took the WNJE call sign.

On May 21, 2012, WNJE ended the simulcast of WEPN and joined ESPN Deportes Radio, a Spanish-language sports station. This came in advance of WEPN's own switch to ESPN Deportes Radio in September, after ESPN Radio took over the operations of WEPN-FM in April.

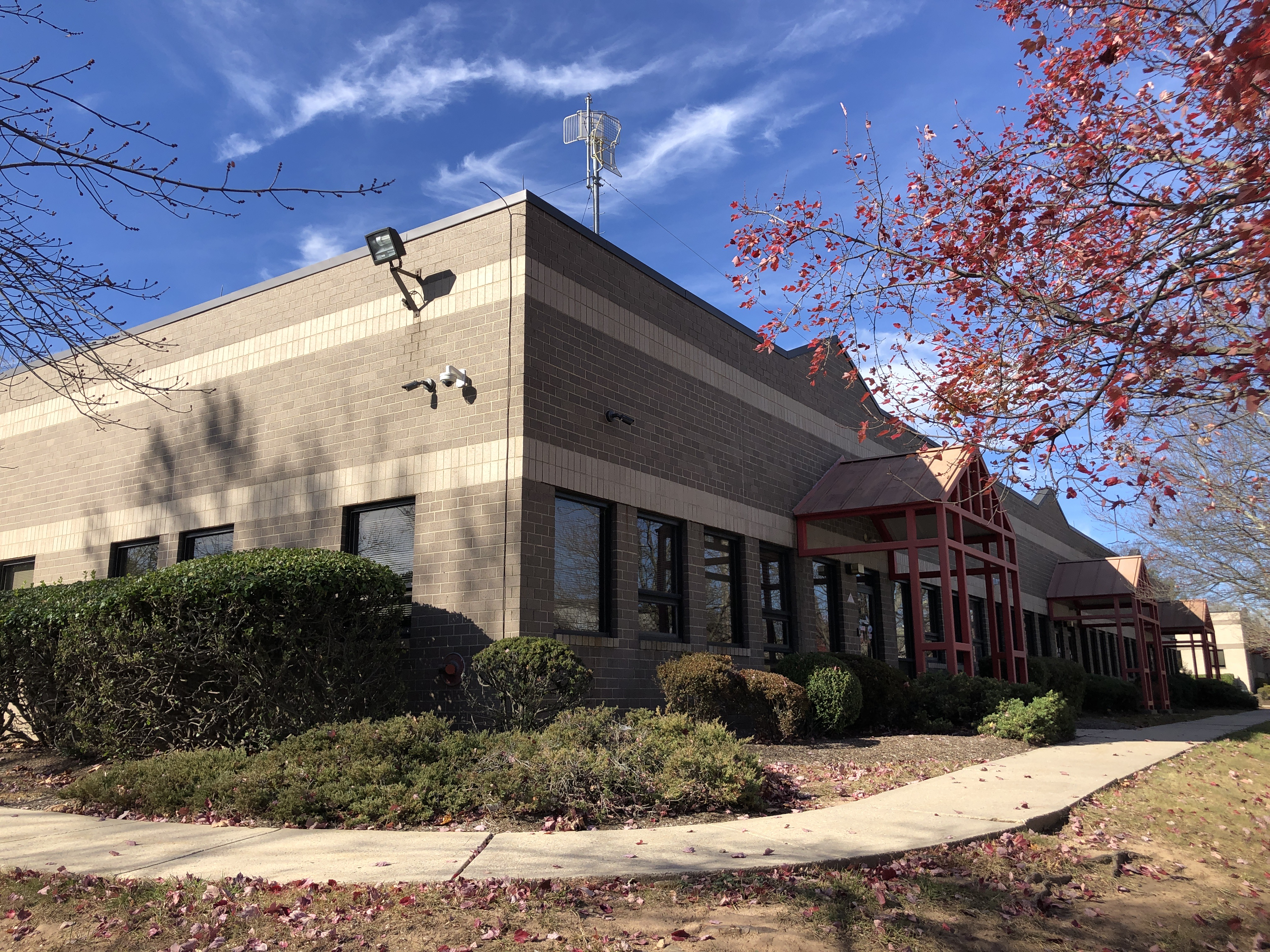
The WCHR studios are at the Townsquare Media office in Ewing, co-located with the studios for New Jersey 101.5 and 94.5 WPST

WNJE and nine other Nassau stations in New Jersey and Pennsylvania were purchased at a bankruptcy auction by NB Broadcasting in May 2012. NB Broadcasting was controlled by Nassau's creditors — Goldman Sachs, Pluss Enterprises, and P.E. Capital. In November, NB Broadcasting filed a motion to assign its rights to the stations to Connoisseur Media.

=== Back to Christian radio ===
On December 3, 2012, WNJE dropped ESPN Deportes Radio and began simulcasting the religious format of WCHR (920 AM). The sale to Connoisseur Media, at a price of $38.7 million, was consummated on May 29, 2013.

On November 13, 2013, the simulcast of the religious format ended, and the Christian programming was subsequently heard only on 1040. AM 920 adopted a secular talk radio format, changed its call letters to WNJE and later was sold. (It is now a Regional Mexican station.) The WCHR call sign was once again moved to 1040.

Effective July 2, 2018, WCHR and sister stations WNJE and WPST were sold to Townsquare Media for $17.3 million.
