= WWEG =

- Myersville, Maryland; United States
- Broadcast area: Hagerstown metropolitan area
- Frequency: 106.9 MHz (HD Radio)
- RDS: PI: 8f2e; PS: WWEG Artist Title; RT: Artist-Title
- Branding: 106-9 The Eagle

Programming
- Format: Classic hits
- Subchannels: HD2: Yacht Rock "Fred FM"; HD3: Real country "100.5 & 93.5 Max Country"; HD4: News/talk (WARK)
- Affiliations: Premiere Networks

Ownership
- Owner: Manning Media, Inc.
- Sister stations: WAFY; WARK

History
- First air date: 1954
- Former call signs: WARK-FM (1954–1976); WWCS (1976–1982); WXCS (1982–1985); WARX (1985–2005)
- Call sign meaning: "Eagle"

Technical information
- Licensing authority: FCC
- Facility ID: 39806
- Class: B
- ERP: 15,500 watts (analog); 620 watts (digital)
- HAAT: 260 meters (850 ft)
- Transmitter coordinates: 39°29′57.4″N 77°36′41.0″W
- Translator: See tables below

Links
- Public license information: Public file; LMS
- Webcast: WWEG: Listen live; HD2: Listen live; HD3: Listen live
- Website: www.1069theeagle.com; HD2: www.heyfredfm.com; HD3: www.maximumcountry.com

WWEG (106.9 MHz, "106-9 The Eagle") is a commercial FM radio station licensed to serve Myersville, Maryland. The station is owned by Manning Broadcasting, Inc. and broadcasts a classic hits format.

The station's transmitter is located in Middletown.

== HD Radio ==
WWEG uses HD Radio and broadcasts a Yacht Rock format on its HD2 subchannel, branded as "Fred FM", which is simulcast on translators W232DG in Frederick, Maryland and W271BV in Hagerstown, Maryland. The station also broadcasts a classic country format on its HD3 subchannel, branded as "93.5 & 100.5 Max Country", which is simulcast on translators W228AM in Frederick, Maryland, and W263CR in Halfway, Maryland. The HD4 subchannel is a simulcast of talk formatted WARK AM.

On May 12, 2025, WWEG's HD2 subchannel changed their format from contemporary Christian to Yacht Rock, branded as "Fred FM".

== History ==
The station signed on for the first time in 1954, with the WARK-FM call sign. In 1976, the call sign was changed to WWCS, standing for "Country Sunshine", an automated country format it ran at the time. In a market dominated with country stations (WYII & WAYZ), WWCS struggled in the ratings even though it had the most powerful broadcast signal.

On October 6, 1982, WWCS became WXCS, dropping its country music format for album-oriented rock using the branding "107 X Marks The Rock". 107 X was a hit immediately, although its popularity waned as the "AOR" format struggled in the 80's.

On March 1, 1985, the call sign was changed to WARX, the AOR format was switched to soft adult contemporary and the station rebranded as "Magic 106.9".

In February 1992, the station switched to an oldies format with a branding change to "Oldies 106.9".

On December 30, 2004, previous owner Manning Broadcasting sold WARK and WARX to Nassau Broadcasting, who took control immediately via a local marketing agreement. On February 27, 2005, Nassau flipped to classic hits with the branding "106-9 The Eagle". Later the same day, nearby Waynesboro, Pennsylvania-based WWMD (now WBHB-FM) switched from Top 40 to classic rock with the WEEG call sign and a similar branding of "Eagle 101.5". After a brief time of dueling "Eagle"s, WEEG ceded the branding the following week and flipped to "Classic Rock 101.5" with the callsign WFYN.

In 2008, the city of license was changed to Myersville, Maryland.

After Nassau went into chapter 11 bankruptcy protection, WWEG and WARK, along with WAFY in Frederick, were re-purchased by Manning Media in May 2012, with the sale being completed on November 1, 2012, at a price of $6.4 million. Manning's repurchase of WWEG and WARK followed a lawsuit against Nassau over missed payments.

== Translators ==
The following three translators simulcast the programming of WWEG-HD2 or HD3:

Call sign	Frequency	City of license	FID	ERP (W)	HAAT	Class	Transmitter coordinates	FCC info	Notes
W228AM	93.5 FM	Frederick, Maryland	20687	150	169 m (554 ft)	D	39°25′5.4″N 77°30′2.0″W	LMS	Simulcasts HD3
W232DG	94.3 FM	Frederick, Maryland	139260	117	24 m (79 ft)	D	39°29′38″N 77°29′55.0″W	LMS	Simulcasts HD2
W263CR	100.5 FM	Halfway, Maryland	141628	250	68 m (223 ft)	D	39°37′36.4″N 77°42′38.0″W	LMS	Simulcasts HD3
W271BV	102.1 FM	Hagerstown, Maryland	155478	250	72 m (236 ft)	D	39°37′36.4″N 77°42′38.0″W	LMS	Simulcasts HD2

== Former logos ==

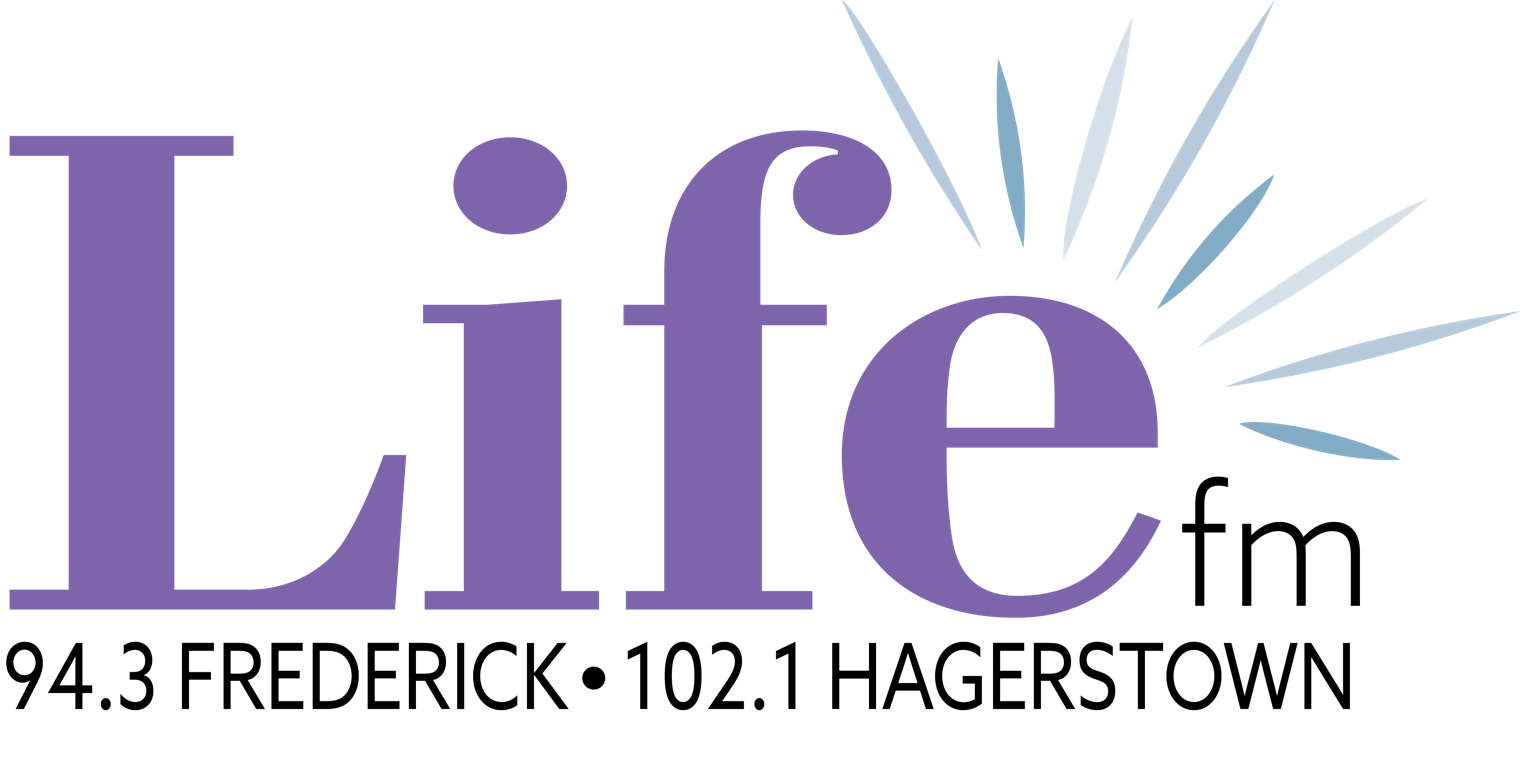
(HD2)
