= WJGK =

- Newburgh, New York; United States
- Broadcast area: Newburgh; Poughkeepsie; Middletown
- Frequency: 103.1 MHz (HD Radio)
- Branding: Fox 103.1

Programming
- Format: Adult contemporary music
- Subchannels: HD2: WGNY (AM) simulcast (sports radio); HD3: WGNY-FM simulcast (oldies)
- Affiliations: ABC News Radio; United Stations Radio Networks

Ownership
- Owner: Sunrise Broadcasting Corporation
- Sister stations: WGNY; WGNY-FM

History
- First air date: October 29, 1966
- Former call signs: WFMN (1966–1985); WGNY-FM (1985–2010)
- Call sign meaning: Radio group owner's initials

Technical information
- Licensing authority: FCC
- Facility ID: 63943
- Class: A
- ERP: 6,000 watts
- HAAT: 85 meters (279 ft)
- Transmitter coordinates: 41°28′25″N 74°08′22″W
- Translator: HD3: 105.3 W287CY (Newburgh)

Links
- Public license information: Public file; LMS
- Webcast: Listen live
- Website: fox1031.com

WJGK (103.1 FM) is a radio station located in Newburgh, New York, which airs an adult contemporary music format.

Originally known as WFMN ("FM Newburgh"; on-air October 29, 1966), the station was owned by brothers Wilbur and Donald Nelson until 1973, when they sold to Stereo Newburgh, Inc. The following year, WFMN was acquired by WGNY (AM), eventually changing its calls to WGNY-FM in 1985, then to WJGK in 2010.

On February 14, 2002, at 12 pm, WGNY-FM relaunched as "Hits 103.1", The Best Hits and The Best Variety of the 80s, 90s and Today. On June 5, 2005, WGNY-FM started a simulcast with WTSX, a station located in Port Jervis, New York, relaunching first as The Fox 96.7 and Hits 103.1, then as Fox 96.7/103.1. It was at one time also known as The Fox 103.1-Your Adult Pop Alternative. WJGK's studios and transmitter are located in New Windsor, New York. On or around September 16, 2020, the station changed its name to Energy 103, under a Hot AC format.
