= WNNJ =

Radio station in Newton, New Jersey

Coordinates: 41.187°N 74.767°W

- Newton, New Jersey; United States
- Broadcast area: Sussex County, New Jersey
- Frequency: 103.7 MHz
- Branding: 103.7 NNJ

Programming
- Format: Classic rock
- Affiliations: United Stations Radio Networks

Ownership
- Owner: iHeartMedia; (iHM Licenses, LLC)
- Sister stations: WSUS, WHCY

History
- First air date: October 15, 1962
- Former call signs: WNNJ-FM (1962–1965); WIXL (1965–1988); WNNJ-FM (1988–2008)
- Call sign meaning: Northern New Jersey

Technical information
- Licensing authority: FCC
- Facility ID: 25413
- Class: B1
- ERP: 2,300 watts
- HAAT: 272 meters (892 ft)

Links
- Public license information: Public file; LMS
- Webcast: Listen live (via iHeartRadio)
- Website: 1037nnj.iheart.com

WNNJ (103.7 FM) is a commercial radio station licensed to Newton, New Jersey, United States, and serving Sussex County. Owned by iHeartMedia, it airs a classic rock format branded as "103.7 NNJ". The studios and offices are on Mitchell Avenue in Franklin, New Jersey.

WNNJ's transmitter is sited on Gigi Lane in Branchville, New Jersey. The signal covers Northwestern New Jersey and reaches parts of northeastern Pennsylvania and Orange County, New York.

== History ==
=== MOR and Beautiful Music ===
The station signed on the air on October 15, 1962. The original call sign was WNNJ-FM, the sister station to WNNJ 1360 AM (now WTOC). WNNJ-AM-FM were locally owned by Simpson Wolfe, incorporated as Sussex County Broadcasters. Initially WNNJ-FM simulcast the Middle of the Road (MOR) format on 1360 WNNJ during the day. Then after WNNJ 1360 signed off for the night (WNNJ was a daytimer) WNNJ-FM played classical music in the evening.

In the mid-1960s, the FCC encouraged co-owned AM-FM stations to separate their programming. WNNJ-FM was renamed WIXL and had an automated beautiful music format. The station played mostly easy listening instrumental cover versions of pop tunes along with a couple of soft vocals per hour. There were similarly formatted stations heard in Sussex County from the Lehigh Valley and New York City which were more popular, so WIXL had trouble competing.

=== Country Music ===
The owners did a format study in the Summer of 1976. The conclusion was that country music fans were underserved in Sussex County. WHN was an AM country station from New York that played pop tunes mixed with country hits. In Franklin, New Jersey, 102.3 WSUS played a format of 50% Top 40 hits and 50% country music. WSUS did switch formats at night to a top 40/rock format keeping the pop and country mix format during the day for the next few years. So it was decided that WIXL would go country full-time. In November 1976 WIXL 103.7 became "XL Country". Two years later, its slogan was "The Home Of Great American Music".

As a country station, WIXL played deep cuts by well known country music artists. Some crossover material was heard but it was the hard core country sound that drove the station. Core artists included Merle Haggard, Waylon Jennings, Tanya Tucker, Sonny James, Charlie Pride, Johnny Cash and Dolly Parton. The station also played an occasional bluegrass song along with a bluegrass show on Sunday evenings. Additionally the station had New York Mets baseball and New York Giants football as well as auto racing at some points.

In 1979, Simpson Wolfe sold WIXL along with WNNJ to Marvin Strauzer and Michael Levine under the name Group M Communications. The country music format continued on WIXL. In 1982, the format evolved to include more crossover material. Early in 1983, the bluegrass show was canceled. After that WIXL began mixing in crossover songs with a slight twang. The playlist included "Turn Turn Turn by the Byrds, "You Were on My Mind" by We Five, and "Classical Gas" by Mason Williams. Well known crossover country artists like Kenny Rogers, John Denver, Linda Ronstadt, Rita Coolidge and Eddie Rabbitt were played as well as cuts by country rock artists like Neil Young, Lynyrd Skynyrd and The Eagles were added to the mix in moderation.

WIXL continued with a country format through most of the 1980s, but as demographics began to change, a format study was done late in 1986. The conclusion was that there was a need for another contemporary music station in the market. Plans for a format change were made early in 1988 for Labor Day weekend. However, competition heard these rumors. Out of fear of being beaten by a competitor, WIXL dropped its country music format on May 28, 1988, at noon.

=== Contemporary Hits ===
This format change faced some controversy. Now country music fans could only get their music on 97.1 WYNY in New York City which had a spotty signal but still could be received. Later that year, Westwood One acquired the WYNY's Country Unit and moved it to 103.5 FM. Because of 103.5 FM's proximity to 103.7, WYNY could no longer be received in the WIXL listening area. As a result, Sussex County residents could not get country music on the radio. Finally, four years later, 106.3 WFMV became "Hot Country WHCY", bringing country music back to the area.

WIXL became a Top 40 (CHR) station, with the entire DJ staff staying on. WIXL became known as "Power 103". Later that year, the station dropped the WIXL call letters and reverted to WNNJ-FM.

In 1992 the station dropped the Power 103 name to simply be known as 103.7 WNNJ-FM following the departure of PD Larry Bear. The station followed an Adult Top 40 format until 1997, with much success. In the fall of 1996, WNNJ-FM 103.7 and WNNJ 1360 AM were sold to Nassau Broadcasting. During this time management changes were made.

=== Classic Hits ===
In January 1997, half the airstaff exited and new DJs were mixed in. The station cut back the news department as well. The Adult Top 40 format was also dropped. WNNJ-FM then flipped to a pop-leaning rock format. The station became known as "Classic Hits 103-7". Musically Classic Hits 103-7 played rock oriented songs from 1964 to 1989. Mixed in were harder rock hits as well as pop hits from the '70s that leaned toward rock, along with a few late 60s and early 80s titles. The station earned high ratings with this format. In September 1998 Chuck Seese and Deanne Schulz were teamed to host the morning show, replacing Pat Butler. DJs during this era included Christa Robinson, Chip Miller, Mike Malone, Vince Thomas, Brett Alan, Andy Roberts, Frank Bruno, and others.

More personnel changes came in August 2000, as a change in ownership was coming. Chuck Seese returned to Nassau's WSBG in Stroudsburg PA, and Schulz became a publicity executive. In the Winter of 2001 Nassau sold WNNJ-FM along with WNNJ 1360, WSUS, WHCY, and local marketing agreements for WDLC and WTSX, to Clear Channel Communications. This was done in exchange for cash, WEEX, and WODE-FM in Easton, Pennsylvania. Those Lehigh Valley stations would become Nassau stations.

=== Classic Rock ===
Under Clear Channel management, Classic Hits 103.7 only made a few slight changes initially. But musically over the next few years the station moved to more of a regular classic rock format. In the fall of 2003, the station dropped the name "Classic Hits 103.7" and became "103.7 WNNJ The Tri State's Classic Rock Station". The airstaff changed gradually and by 2004 was totally different from what it had been under Nassau. It also added the nationally syndicated Nights with Alice Cooper show in the evenings. Eventually, the Alice Cooper show was dropped.

On July 1, 2008, WNNJ-FM officially changed its call letters to WNNJ, because 1360 WNNJ modified its format and changed its call letters to WTOC. Because the FM station no longer shared call letters with an AM station, the FM suffix was no longer needed. From July 9, 2012, until early 2020, Gary Cee, formerly of WPDH, was the Program Director of WNNJ.

== Facilities ==
WNNJ's transmitter is located in Frankford Township and transmits at 2,300 watts as a Class B1 FM station. Originally the transmitter was in Andover Township in Springdale (a couple miles from where AM 1360's transmitter is still located). The station wanted to relocate the tower in Fredon but faced a opposition. Finally in 1986, the station began transmitting at the present location.

Its studios were located outside of Newton for many years as well. In September 2004, the studios and offices moved into state of the art facilities in Franklin on Mitchell Avenue along with other iHeartMedia stations in the Sussex County cluster, WHCY and WSUS.
