= WGNY-FM =

- Rosendale, New York; United States
- Broadcast area: Poughkeepsie, New York
- Frequency: 98.9 MHz
- Branding: Oldies 98.9

Programming
- Format: Oldies
- Affiliations: ABC News Radio, Westwood One

Ownership
- Owner: Sunrise Broadcasting Corporation
- Sister stations: WGNY

History
- First air date: February 26, 2011; 14 years ago

Technical information
- Licensing authority: FCC
- Facility ID: 78943
- Class: A
- ERP: 1,350 watts
- HAAT: 213 meters (699 ft)
- Transmitter coordinates: 41°50′26.9″N 73°59′25.7″W
- Translators: 105.3 W287CY (Newburgh, New York, relays WJGK-HD3)
- Repeater: 103.1 WJGK-HD3 (Newburgh, New York)

Links
- Public license information: Public file; LMS
- Webcast: Listen Live
- Website: wgnyfm.com

WGNY-FM (98.9 MHz) is a radio station broadcasting an oldies format. Licensed to Rosendale, New York, United States, the station serves the Poughkeepsie and Kingston areas. The station, which signed on on February 26, 2011, is owned by Hawkeye Communications and operated by Sunrise Broadcasting Corporation, and features programming from ABC News Radio. It also broadcasts in HD, and carries Dance "Drive FX" on its HD-2 channel. Its studios are in New Windsor, New York and its transmitter is in Esopus, New York.

Logo while simulcasting with 1220
