= Zach Gelb =

American sports talk radio personality (born 1994)

Zach Gelb (born August 9, 1994) is an American sports talk radio personality who is best known as host of the Zach Gelb Show on CBS Sports Radio.

== Career ==
Gelb attended Temple University where he was sports director for the student radio station WHIP. He also interned at 94 WIP. On March 25, 2016 he was hired as PD and host for WNJE Fox Sports 920 the Jersey, the only Fox Sports Radio affiliate in the area. In August 2017 he began working Eagles Postgame on WPEN (FM). On March 1, 2018 Gelb announced he would be leaving WNJE for a national show 2–6 AM EST weekends with CBS Sports Radio. On Monday October 7, 2019 Gelb announced he would leave CBS for SiriusXM Mad Dog Radio Tuesday, Wednesday, and Friday and Sirius XM NFL Radio Monday and Thursday. He returned to CBS in 2020 with a 6-10 PM EST show. In September 2023 Gelb's show moved to the 3-6 PM Eastern slot on CBS Sports Radio.

== Personal ==
Zach Gelb is the son of Bob Gelb, who has been a part of the first sports radio station, WFAN, since its founding in 1987.
