= Peter Bart =

American journalist and film producer (born 1932)

- Born: Peter Benton Bart; July 24, 1932 (age 94); New York City, New York, United States
- Occupations: Author, managing editor, film producer, journalist, screenwriter, television host
- Spouses: Dorothy Callmann (m. 1961; div. 1981) Leslie Cox (m. 1982; div. 2005) Phyllis Fredette (m. 2008)
- Children: 2

Peter Benton Bart (born July 24, 1932) is an American journalist and film producer, writing a column for Deadline Hollywood since 2015. He is best known for his lengthy tenure (1989–2009) as the editor–in–chief of Variety, an entertainment-trade magazine.

Bart was also a co-host, with film producer Peter Guber, of the weekly television series, Shootout (formerly Sunday Morning Shootout), carried on the AMC television channel from 2003 to 2008 and subsequently seen in syndication and in 53 countries around the world.

== Early life and education ==
Bart was born in New York City, the son of Clara (née Ginsberg) and Max S. Bart and raised on Manhattan's Upper West Side. His mother and likely his father were Austrian Jews who emigrated in the early twentieth century, and both worked as public school teachers. His father was strictly irreligious and anti-communist. Bart was educated at Friends Seminary in New York City; Swarthmore College, near Philadelphia, Pennsylvania; and The London School of Economics and Political Science in London, United Kingdom.

== Career ==
He served as a reporter and columnist for The New York Times and as a reporter for The Wall Street Journal and the Chicago Sun-Times prior to entering the film business.

Starting in 1967, Bart worked as an executive at Paramount Pictures, rising to vice president in charge of production; his relationship with Robert Evans was documented in Evans' autobiography The Kid Stays in the Picture. He played a key role in such films as Rosemary's Baby (1968), True Grit (1969), Harold and Maude (1971), The Godfather (1972) and Paper Moon (1973). After eight years at Paramount, he became senior vice president for production at Metro-Goldwyn-Mayer. He also partnered with Max Palevsky, with whom he co-produced Fun with Dick and Jane (1977) and Islands in the Stream (1977). He became president of Lorimar Productions in April 1978 and helped turn it from a TV based company to a mini-major and was involved in recruiting Hal Ashby, Peter Sellers and Shirley MacLaine for Being There (1979); William Friedkin and Jerry Weintraub for Cruising (1980); and Jack Nicholson and Bob Rafelson for The Postman Always Rings Twice (1981). He resigned from Lorimar in June 1979 but retained an office there and continued his relationship with the company. He also wrote the screenplay for the 1971 film Making It.

He joined Variety as editor-in-chief in 1989. In 2007, Bart appointed Tim Gray to become his successor as editor with the understanding that he would stay on as columnist, blogger, and consultant. In April 2009, it was announced that Bart was moving to the position of "vice president and editorial director", characterized online as "Boffo No More: Bart Up and Out at Variety".

In 2001, Los Angeles Magazine reported that Bart had sold the rights to an 86-page novella called Power Play, about "a power struggle between established casino owners and Indian tribes," to Paramount Pictures, where his friend and business associate Robert Evans was a producer. Bart explained he had "probably spent a weekend" adapting the novella from a 108-page script called Crossroaders. The title page of the script showed it had been authored "By Leslie Cox", Bart's wife at the time, "Based on the novel by Peter Bart. September 1996." When asked if he wrote the script himself as well, Bart said he could not remember. Variety policy prohibits staffers from selling scripts, as doing so could generate a conflict of interest given that publication's focus and influence on the Hollywood movie industry, though Bart said he has no problem with staff selling the movie rights to books they have written.

He served as executive producer and screenwriter of the documentary film, Boffo! Tinseltown's Bombs and Blockbusters (2006), which was shown on the HBO television channel.

Through the years, Bart has published eight books, including five non-fiction and three fiction.

He serves on the board of advisors for Penske Media Company.

== Personal life ==
In 1961, he married Dorothy Callman; they had two daughters, Colby Bart Centrella (born 1962) and Dilys Bart Shelton (born 1966). His second wife was Leslie Cox. In 2008, Bart married for a third time to the former Phyllis Fredette. His nephew is actor Roger Bart.

== Filmography ==
He was a producer in all films unless otherwise noted.

=== Film ===
Year	Film	Credit
1977	Fun with Dick and Jane	
1977	Islands in the Stream	
1984	Revenge of the Nerds	Executive producer
1986	Youngblood	
1987	Revenge of the Nerds II: Nerds in Paradise	
2005	Fun with Dick and Jane	Executive producer

As writer

Year	Film
1971	Making It

Miscellaneous crew

Year	Film	Role
1981	Reborn	Creative consultant
TBA	Francis and the Godfather	Creative consultant

As an actor

Year	Film	Role
1997	An Alan Smithee Film: Burn Hollywood Burn	Himself

Thanks

Year	Film	Role
2019	The Planters	Extra special thanks

=== Television ===
Year	Title	Credit
2006	Square Off	Executive producer
2009−11	In the House with Peter Bart & Peter Guber	Executive producer
2012	Movie Talk with Peter Bart	Executive producer

== See also ==
- Variety
- Shootout

== Bibliography ==
(This list may be incomplete.)

- Destinies, a novel co-written with Denne Bart Petitclerc (Simon & Schuster, 1979)
- Thy Kingdom Come, a novel (Linden, 1981)
- Fade Out: The Calamitous Final Days of MGM, nonfiction (Morrow, 1990). Refers to the final days of MGM as a historic film studio in Culver City, California. (MGM still exists as a company.)
- The Gross: the Hits, the Flops – the Summer that Ate Hollywood, nonfiction (St. Martin's Press, 1999) (paperback: St. Martin's Griffin, 2000) ISBN 978-0-312-25391-2
- Who Killed Hollywood? and Put the Tarnish on Tinseltown, nonfiction (Renaissance, 2000)
- Shoot Out: Surviving the Fame and (Mis)fortune of Hollywood, nonfiction coauthored with Peter Guber (Putnam, 2002)
- Dangerous Company: Dark Tales from Tinseltown, a collection of short stories (Miramax, 2003)
- Boffo! Hollywood in the Trenches: How I Learned to Love the Blockbuster and Fear the Bomb, nonfiction (Miramax, 2006)
- Infamous Players: A Tale of Movies, the Mob (and Sex), nonfiction (Weinstein Books, 2011)
