= Shootout (TV series) =

US talk and interview television program

- Also known as: Sunday Morning Shootout; Hollywood Shootout
- Genre: Talk/interview
- Created by: Scott Sternberg
- Starring: Peter Bart; Peter Guber
- Country of origin: United States
- Original language: English
- No. of seasons: 5
- No. of episodes: 192

Production
- Executive producers: Scott Sternberg; Jacquie Jordan; Gary Marks; Joy Dolce
- Running time: 30 minutes

Original release
- Network: AMC
- Release: October 12, 2003 – August 17, 2008

Shootout, also known as Sunday Morning Shootout, was a talk and interview program produced by the cable television network AMC. The episodes first aired on AMC on Sunday mornings, before being rerun and syndicated to other networks (under the title Hollywood Shootout).

The show debuted on October 12, 2003. It was hosted by Peter Bart (a film producer and editor-in-chief of Variety) and film producer and former film studio president Peter Guber.

Each half-hour episode usually had two segments; one in which Guber and Bart discussed various topics in the film industry, and one where they jointly interviewed that week's guest(s).

On December 16, 2008, Bart wrote in his blog on the Variety website that Shootout "will now migrate to a different time and different neighborhood." The last show episode at its regular timeslot was December 21, 2008.

Bart and Guber returned to AMC on February 13, 2009 with Storymakers, which was similar to Shootout, but airing in primetime, albeit infrequently (another episode aired on May 15, 2009).

In 2010, Bart and Guber co-hosted In the House, a similar interview series airing on Encore.
