= WPCO (AM) =

Radio station in Stroudsburg, Pennsylvania

- Stroudsburg, Pennsylvania; United States
- Frequency: 840 kHz
- Branding: Poco 103

Programming
- Format: Classic hits
- Affiliations: CBS News Radio; Compass Media Networks; United Stations Radio Networks

Ownership
- Owner: Seven Mountains Media; (Southern Belle, LLC)
- Sister stations: WSBG; WVPO

History
- First air date: 1947
- Former call signs: WHAB (1947–1948); WVPO (1948–2023)
- Call sign meaning: "Poco" (as in Poconos)

Technical information
- Licensing authority: FCC
- Facility ID: 47423
- Class: D
- Power: 250 watts day
- Transmitter coordinates: 40°58′26.3″N 75°11′41.7″W
- Translator: 103.1 W276DG (Stroudsburg)

Links
- Public license information: Public file; LMS
- Webcast: Listen live
- Website: poco103.com

WPCO (840 kHz) is an AM radio station broadcasting a classic hits format in Stroudsburg, Pennsylvania, United States. The station is owned by Seven Mountains Media, through licensee Southern Belle, LLC.

== History ==
WPCO began operation as WHAB in 1947. A year later, the station changed its call sign to WVPO "The Voice of the Poconos". The station offered a blend of local news and popular music.

The station moved studio locations after a devastating fire hit Main Street on July 29, 1958. The station was located above the Rea and Derick Drug Store and relocated temporarily to the transmitter site stop Godfrey's Ridge.

In 1959, studios were moved to 22 South 6th Street, in the building that formerly housed Stroudsburg's Post Office. In the 1960s, the station employed a middle of the road (MOR) format, playing mostly pop standards.

In the early 1980s, WVPO evolved into an adult contemporary format. Their local owners were known as Keystone Broadcasters.

In 1994, WVPO and WSBG were sold to Nassau Broadcasting Partners. The format remained adult contemporary until 1997. That year, the station switched to an adult standards format playing the easy listening hits of the 1950s and 1960s, along with some softer oldies of the 1960s and 1970s, and some contemporary artists doing pop standards.

In 1998, WVPO and WSBG were sold to Multicultural Broadcasting, but continued to be managed by Nassau.

In 2002, Nassau acquired full ownership of WVPO and WSBG. In the Summer of 2003, WVPO dropped the MOR Adult Standards format in favor of an oldies format. During this time, WVPO aired a sports programming including: NY Jets and NY Giants NFL football, NY Yankees Baseball, and has been the home of ESU Warrior (East Stroudsburg University of Pennsylvania) college football for over 40 years.

In December 2006, Nassau ended local programming on WVPO and WPLY and began to simulcast co-owned FM station WWYY, after a planned sale fell through. The final breath of live air staff at WVPO, in December 2006, consisted of Peter Ward weekday mornings, Rod Bauman weekday mid-days, and Linda Murphy weekday afternoons, with other various weekend and fill-in staff.

In the last week of January 2007, WVPO and WPLY changed to a format of syndicated talk programs. The new lineup featured Imus in the Morning along with various political and financial talk programs.

In 2012, WVPO celebrated its 50th season as the broadcast home of East Stroudsburg University football games. Long-time WVPO/WSBG announcer Chuck Seese began his 24th season as the play-by-play voice of the Warriors.

The station, along with nine other Nassau stations in New Jersey and Pennsylvania, was purchased at bankruptcy auction by NB Broadcasting in May 2012. NB Broadcasting was controlled by Nassau's creditors — Goldman Sachs, Pluss Enterprises, and P.E. Capital. In November, NB Broadcasting filed a motion to assign its rights to the stations to Connoisseur Media. The transaction, at a price of $38.7 million, was consummated on May 29, 2013.

On August 14, 2019, Connoisseur Media agreed to sell WVPO along with sister station WSBG and the construction permit for translator W276DG to Seven Mountains Media. The sale was consummated on October 31, 2019, at a price of $1.1 million.

On July 6, 2020, WVPO changed its format from sports to country, branded as "Bigfoot Country".

On March 8, 2023, WVPO changed its format from country to classic hits, branded as "Pocono 103.1" under new WPCO call sign; the WVPO call sign and "Bigfoot Country" programming moved to WABT (96.7 FM), the previous home of the "Pocono" classic hits format.

On April 26, 2023, WPCO rebranded as "Poco 103".
