= WPST =

Radio station in Trenton, New Jersey

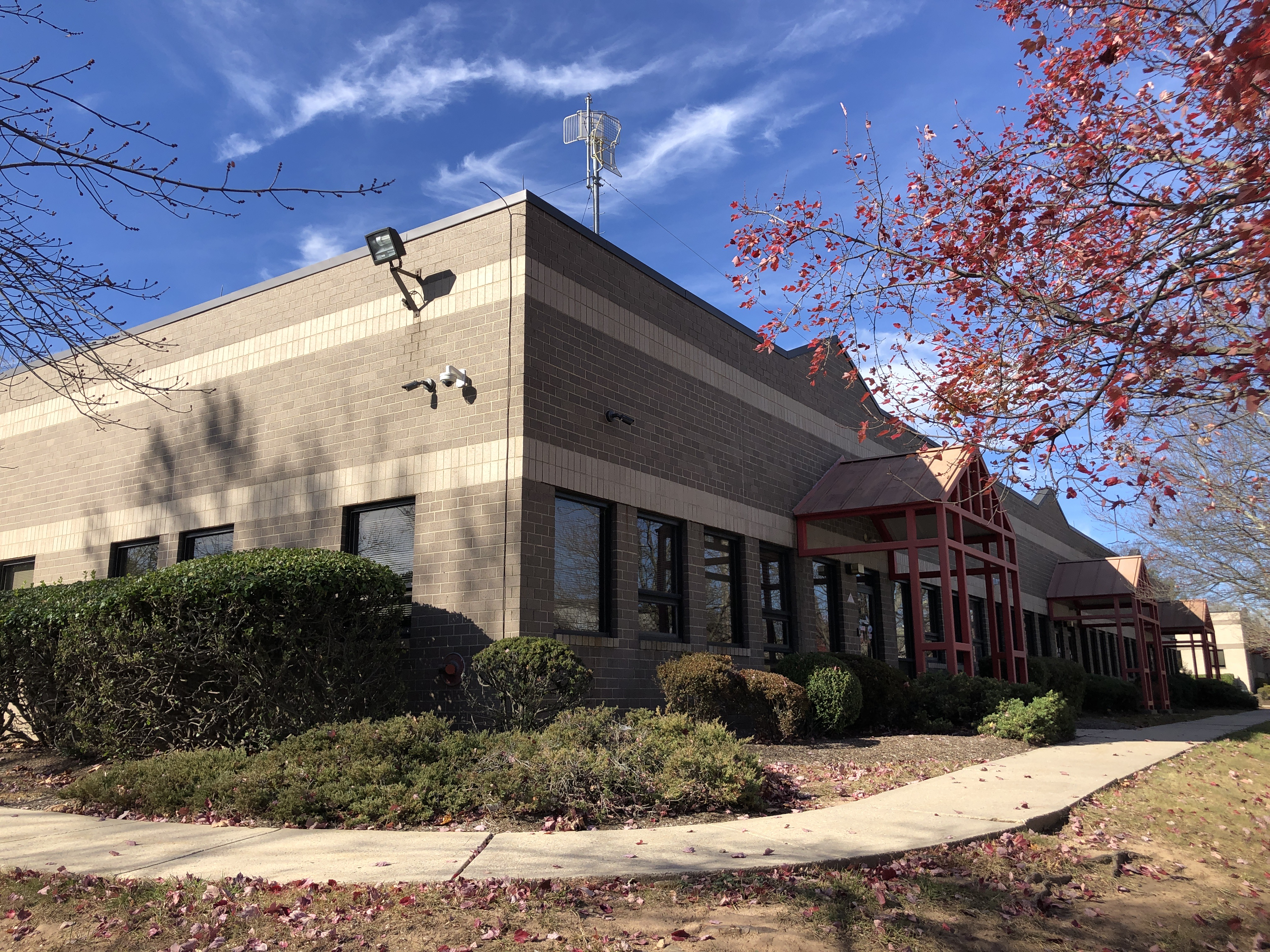
- WPST's studios at the Townsquare Media facilities in Ewing, New Jersey
- Trenton, New Jersey; United States
- Broadcast area: Central New Jersey; Philadelphia metropolitan area
- Frequency: 94.5 MHz (HD Radio)
- Branding: 94.5 PST

Programming
- Format: Contemporary hit radio

Ownership
- Owner: Townsquare Media; (Townsquare License, LLC)
- Sister stations: WCHR; WKXW

History
- First air date: August 7, 1965
- Former call signs: WTTM-FM (1965–1969); WCHR (1969–1998); WNJO (1998–2002); WTHK (2002–2005)
- Call sign meaning: "Passport" or "Passport Stereo Trenton"

Technical information
- Licensing authority: FCC
- Facility ID: 25013
- Class: B
- ERP: 50,000 watts (horiz.); 48,000 watts (vert.)
- HAAT: 150 meters (490 ft)
- Transmitter coordinates: 40°11′21.8″N 74°50′47.6″W

Links
- Public license information: Public file; LMS
- Webcast: Listen live
- Website: wpst.com

WPST (94.5 FM, "94.5 PST") is a commercial radio station licensed to Trenton, New Jersey, airing a contemporary hit radio format. Owned by Townsquare Media, the station serves Central Jersey and the Philadelphia metropolitan area.

The station's studio is located in the suburbs of Trenton in Ewing, New Jersey. Its broadcast tower is located west of Morrisville, Pennsylvania, at (40°11′21.8″N 74°50′47.6″W). In addition to a standard analog transmission, the station can be streamed online.

== History ==
On August 7, 1965, 94.5 signed on as WTTM-FM. It was owned by the Scott Broadcasting Company, Inc. of New Jersey and was the adjunct to WTTM (920 AM). On February 1, 1969, WTTM-FM became WCHR, a religious station; in 1974, it was approved to increase its effective radiated power to 50,000 watts.

The Scott family sold WTTM and WCHR in 1996 for $20 million to Nassau Broadcasting Partners. The sale prompted immediate speculation that a format change was in the offing for WCHR. That November, WCHR's religious programming began being simulcast on 920 AM. On February 27, 1998, the 94.5 frequency began stunting with construction sound effects.

On March 2, 1998, at 5:00 pm, 94.5 relaunched as "New Jersey's Oldies Station", with new WNJO call letters. The station's format of primary 1960s oldies was selected so as to avoid cannibalizing Nassau's other Trenton station, WPST (97.5 FM). The first request on the new WNJO was made by Governor Christine Whitman, who attended the launch.

WNJO brought in morning personality Don Kellogg who was a ratings winner, but facing competition from WKXW which was moving in a 1970s direction, and inspired by the revenue success of a similar flip at Nassau's station in Allentown, Pennsylvania, WNJO became classic hits "The Hawk" on December 1, 2001, and adopted WTHK call letters on August 1, 2002.

WPST's contemporary hit radio format moved from 97.5 to 94.5 on February 14, 2005, at 5 pm. At the same time, WTHK's programming moved to 97.5, which had been approved to move its community of license to Burlington, New Jersey, closer to Philadelphia.

The station, along with nine other Nassau stations in New Jersey and Pennsylvania, was purchased at bankruptcy auction by NB Broadcasting in May 2012. NB Broadcasting was controlled by Nassau's creditors — Goldman Sachs, Pluss Enterprises, and P.E. Capital. In November, NB Broadcasting filed a motion to assign its rights to the stations to Connoisseur Media. The sale to Connoisseur Media, at a price of $38.7 million, was consummated on May 29, 2013.

On March 22, 2018, it was announced that the station had been sold by Connoisseur Media to Townsquare Media (along with WNJE and WCHR) for a deal totaling $17.3 million. The acquisition was finalized on July 2, 2018.

== Signal note ==
WPST is short-spaced to two other Class B stations: WXBK 94.7 The Block (licensed to serve Newark, New Jersey) and WDAC (licensed to serve Lancaster, Pennsylvania). They are also short spaced due to WJLK-FM on 94.3 in Asbury Park.

WPST and WXBK operate on first adjacent channels (94.5 MHz and 94.7 MHz) and the distance between the stations' transmitters is 59 miles as determined by FCC rules. The minimum distance between two Class B stations operating on first adjacent channels according to current FCC rules is 105 miles.

WPST and WDAC operate on the same channel and the distance between the stations' transmitters is 76 miles as determined by FCC rules. The minimum distance between two Class B stations operating on the same channel according to current FCC rules is 150 miles.

== See also ==
- WPEN (FM)
