= WYNY (AM) =

Radio station in Milford, Pennsylvania

- Milford, Pennsylvania; United States
- Frequency: 1450 kHz
- Branding: Pike 106.9

Programming
- Format: Adult contemporary
- Affiliations: NBC News Radio; United Stations Radio Networks

Ownership
- Owner: Digital Radio Broadcasting, Inc.
- Sister stations: WALL, WDLC

History
- First air date: 2011; 15 years ago
- Former call signs: WQCD (2008–2009); WDRE (2009–2010); WMJQ (2010–2011)

Technical information
- Licensing authority: FCC
- Facility ID: 161541
- Class: C
- Power: 1,000 watts
- Transmitter coordinates: 41°20′10″N 74°47′45″W
- Translators: 98.3 W252DY (Sussex, New Jersey); 106.9 W295AQ (Milford)

Links
- Public license information: Public file; LMS
- Webcast: Listen live
- Website: www.thepike1069.com

WYNY (1450 kHz) is an American AM radio station licensed to serve Milford, Pennsylvania. The station is owned by Digital Radio Broadcasting, Inc.

It broadcasts an adult contemporary music radio format.

The station was assigned the call sign WYNY by the Federal Communications Commission (FCC) on August 22, 2011.

== History ==
The station originally dates back to 2008 as WQCD. Its original airdate is 2011.

On July 5, 2012, WYNY changed their format from country music to adult contemporary.

On June 8, 2021, it was rebranded as "Lite 106.9".

== Translators ==
Call sign	Frequency	City of license	FID	ERP (W)	Class	FCC info
W252DY	98.3 FM	Sussex, New Jersey	201477	150	D	LMS
W295AQ	106.9 FM	Milford, Pennsylvania	156279	250	D	LMS
