= WTOC (AM) =

Radio station in Newton, New Jersey

Coordinates: 41°2′22.35″N 74°44′17.59″W

- Newton, New Jersey; United States
- Broadcast area: Sussex County, New Jersey Skylands
- Frequency: 1360 kHz
- Branding: Transformación Radio

Programming
- Format: Spanish Christian

Ownership
- Owner: Centro Biblico of NJ, Inc.

History
- First air date: 1953
- Former call signs: WNNJ (1953–2008)
- Call sign meaning: Station was formerly affiliated with the True Oldies Channel

Technical information
- Licensing authority: FCC
- Facility ID: 25414
- Class: B
- Power: 2,000 watts (day); 320 watts (night)
- Translator: 95.9 W240EE (Dover)

Links
- Public license information: Public file; LMS
- Webcast: Listen live
- Website: www.transformacionradio.com

WTOC (1360 AM) was a radio station licensed to Newton, New Jersey. Owned by Centro Biblico of NJ, Inc., the station broadcasts a Spanish-language Christian radio format. The station went silent February 28, 2026, and its license was turned into the FCC soon after. Until August 17, 2011, they aired an oldies music format with songs from the 1960s and 1970s along with a small number of oldies from 1955 to 1964 and a small number of hits from the 1980s, a full-time affiliate of Scott Shannon's True Oldies Channel from Citadel Media. The station was owned by Clear Channel Communications from 2001 until 2011. From the station's 1953 sign-on until July 1, 2008, the radio station was known as WNNJ.

== History ==
The station was known as WNNJ when it signed on as a daytimer in 1953 and had a full service middle of the road music and news format. The station was owned by Simpson Wolfe, incorporated as Sussex County Broadcasters. In 1961, Wolfe got the construction permit for 103.7 FM. That station, WNNJ-FM signed on in 1962 and broke away as WIXL in the mid-1960s. By 1971, WNNJ would evolve into an adult contemporary music format with a slight lean on Top 40 music. The station was also news intensive. WNNJ was also allowed to sign on at 6:00 a.m. even if it stayed dark after because they had a pre sunrise authorization. In the fall of 1978, WNNJ modified their music to more of a Top 40 format adding more rock music.

In 1979, Group M Communications headed by Marvin Strauzer & Mike Levine purchased WNNJ and WIXL. WNNJ stayed with top 40 until October 1981, when they evolved back into an adult contemporary format and in November 1981 into adult standards format, mixing in some adult contemporary hits. The amounts of adult contemporary hits varied from more than half to only a couple an hour depending upon the time of day and who was on the air. The station tried to be more consistent by the early summer playing very limited contemporary songs but by the late summer the station began to lean adult contemporary again. In the fall of 1982 though the station abruptly dropped the baby boomer pop and became a big band and standards station only playing music from the 1930s to the 1950s, with a few exceptions by Sinatra-type artists. By the spring of 1983 the station evolved back to a middle of the road format blending standards and soft AC cuts.

That fall, the station moved into an easy listening leaning format playing almost no big bands but only small amounts of adult contemporary cuts. The station was now leaning toward artists like Frank Sinatra, Nat "King" Cole, Nancy Wilson, Johnny Mathis, among others. This format failed, and on February 8, 1984, at 1:00 p.m. WNNJ became a soft adult contemporary station. At that point WNNJ got a post sunset authorization to stay on the air until 6 p.m. even in the months that dusk occurred before 6. That summer they modified into more of a contemporary hit radio station mixing in a few oldies. In the winter of 1985, under new program director William Cox, and after a few false starts, WNNJ settled on an adult contemporary/oldies hybrid format under the name "Solid Gold 1360 WNNJ". The format did well through the late 1980s. In 1989 WNNJ got 24-hour-a-day authorization to broadcast. WNNJ now could stay on the air during the overnight but still signed off at 10:00 p.m.

By 1990, the current product was dropped and the station had evolved into a broad based 1955-1989 oldies format still known as Solid Gold 1360 WNNJ. In January 1994, some of the full-time airstaff was laid off while other full timers and part timers were moved to WNNJ-FM. WNNJ became a satellite oldies station playing music from 1955 to 1975. The station was still called Solid Gold 1360 WNNJ but was entirely automated. The station also began broadcasting 24 hours a day.

Late in 1996, Nassau Broadcasting purchased WNNJ and WNNJ-FM. WNNJ dropped the satellite oldies in favor of ABC's Stardust satellite format featuring an eclectic blend of standards, soft rock oldies, soft AC cuts, and some big bands. The station remained automated full-time, known as "Unforgettable 1360 WNNJ".

During the summer of 1998 WNNJ added a live weekday morning show from 5:30 to 10 a.m. with Chris Debello. The show consisted of a few adult standard songs along with news and listener phone calls. In 2000 the satellite format was switched to Westwood One's standards format which was a blend of soft rock oldies, easy listening standards, and soft adult contemporary hits. By now the station was known as simply "1360 WNNJ".

In January 2001, WNNJ, WNNJ-FM and WSUS were sold to Clear Channel Communications, along with the local marketing agreement Nassau had with WDLC and WTSX. The station stayed with this standards format for about a year and eight months but advertising was very low. At 3 p.m. on November 27, 2002, WNNJ switched to country as "Bear Country 1360". The station was entirely automated with in house voicetracking except for overnights when they ran After Midnite. Ratings were still very low but the format lasted until September 2004.

In September 2004 Clear Channel lost the local marketing agreement with locally owned WTSX (known as Fox 96.7) which played 1960s and 1970s oldies. At the end of the month WTSX went their separate way. Most of the airstaff would stay with Clear Channel, which the oldies format over to WNNJ, dropping country in favor of "Oldies 1360". In the spring of 2005, Oldies 1360 added former WCBS-FM personality Max Kinkel to mornings. Late in October 2006, Max Kinkle suffered debilitating injuries in an automobile accident. He never returned to the station.

On July 30, 2007, local voice tracking and personalities were abruptly dropped. The station continued its automated oldies format for a few more weeks. Then on August 21 at noon, WNNJ picked up a satellite format called "Timeless Classics", which played a mix of soft oldies, some soft AC cuts, and some adult standards. Core artists included Beatles, Frank Sinatra, Elvis Presley, Neil Diamond, Ray Charles, Billy Joel, Roy Orbison, and others.

On June 26, 2008, it was announced that WNNJ was dropping their call letters on July 1, 2008, and would be known as WTOC at that time. On the evening of June 30, 2008, the classic AC/odies Timeless format was dropped in favor of Scott Shannon's True Oldies Channel. WTOC shares its call letters with WTOC-TV, a CBS television affiliate in Savannah, Georgia; the two stations are not affiliated.

On July 21, 2010, Clear Channel announced that they would donate WTOC, along with KFXN in Minneapolis, to the Minority Media and Telecommunications Council through the MMTC-Clear Channel Ownership Diversity Initiative. According to press releases at the time, originally, Clear Channel would continue to manage the station with a local marketing agreement and WTOC would continue to offer True Oldies Channel. At the same time it was stated that Minority Media also had the option of selling the station and they executed that option in August 2011 selling the station to Radio Visión Cristiana. The station then signed off at noon on August 17, 2011. The last song played was "Hello Goodbye" by the Beatles. The last voice heard was that of chief engineer for Clear Channel Sussex and staff announcer Tony Dee. On December 19, 2011, WTOC signed back on with a Spanish-language Christian format under ownership of Radio Visión Cristiana.

In September 2013, WTOC was sold by Radio Visión Cristiana to Centro Biblico of NJ, Inc. for $235,000. The sale was consummated on September 23, 2013. In January 2026, it was announced that 1360 WTOC would leave the air permanently on February 28, 2026 citing lack of listenership and revenue to keep the station on the air. WTOC signed off on February 28, 2026 and the license was surrendered to the FCC soon after.
