= WDLC =

- Port Jervis, New York; United States
- Frequency: 1490 kHz
- Branding: Country 107.7

Programming
- Format: Country music
- Affiliations: NBC News Radio; Compass Media Networks; United Stations Radio Networks

Ownership
- Owner: Neversink Radio, LLC
- Sister stations: WALL; WYNY

History
- First air date: July 4, 1953

Technical information
- Licensing authority: FCC
- Facility ID: 53035
- Class: C
- Power: 1,000 watts unlimited
- Transmitter coordinates: 41°21′49.3″N 74°40′39.6″W
- Translators: 95.3 W237EV (Middletown); 107.7 W299BA (Port Jervis)

Links
- Public license information: Public file; LMS
- Webcast: Listen live
- Website: www.wdlccountry.com

WDLC (1490 AM) is a radio station airing a country music format, licensed Port Jervis, New York. The station is owned by Neversink Radio, LLC, which also manages other local stations in the Tri-State area and the Hudson Valley.
