= Free to Choose (TV series) =

American documentary television series

- Written by: Milton Friedman
- Directed by: David Filkin; Graham Massey (film)
- Starring: Milton Friedman; Robert McKenzie
- Country of origin: United States
- Original language: English
- No. of episodes: 10 (1980); 5 (1990)

Production
- Executive producer: Bob Chitester
- Producer: Michael Latham
- Running time: 57 minutes (1980); 48 minutes (1990)
- Production company: Video Arts Television
- Budget: $2.8 million

Original release
- Network: PBS
- Release: January 11, 1980

Free to Choose is an American television series broadcast by PBS in 1980 and 1990, accompanied by the 1980 book of the same name written by economists Milton and Rose Friedman. Originally broadcast in ten parts beginning in January 1980, it was created at the suggestion of Bob Chitester, the owner of WQLN-TV.

The format of each episode consists of two parts: first, a documentary film in which Milton Friedman travels around the world and examines economic successes and failures in history, which he attributes to free-market capitalism or the lack thereof. After the documentary, Friedman engages in a discussion at the University of Chicago, moderated by Robert McKenzie, with a number of others who have watched the film. The discussion participants are drawn from government, trade unions, the academy, media, and the business community, such as Donald Rumsfeld, then of G. D. Searle & Company, Frances Fox Piven of Boston University, and Thomas Sowell of the University of California, Los Angeles (UCLA). The interlocutors offer objections to or support for the proposals put forward by Friedman, who in turn responds. After the final episode, Friedman is interviewed by Lawrence Spivak.

The series was rebroadcast in 1990 with five episodes. Arnold Schwarzenegger, George Shultz, Ronald Reagan, David D. Friedman, and Steve Allen each give a personal introductions for one episode, followed by, in four cases, one of the ten documentary films first aired in 1980. The third episode of the 1990 series features a documentary segment aired for the first time. In the five 1990 episodes, after the documentary segment, Friedman has a debate, moderated by Linda Chavez, with two guests.

== Development and production ==
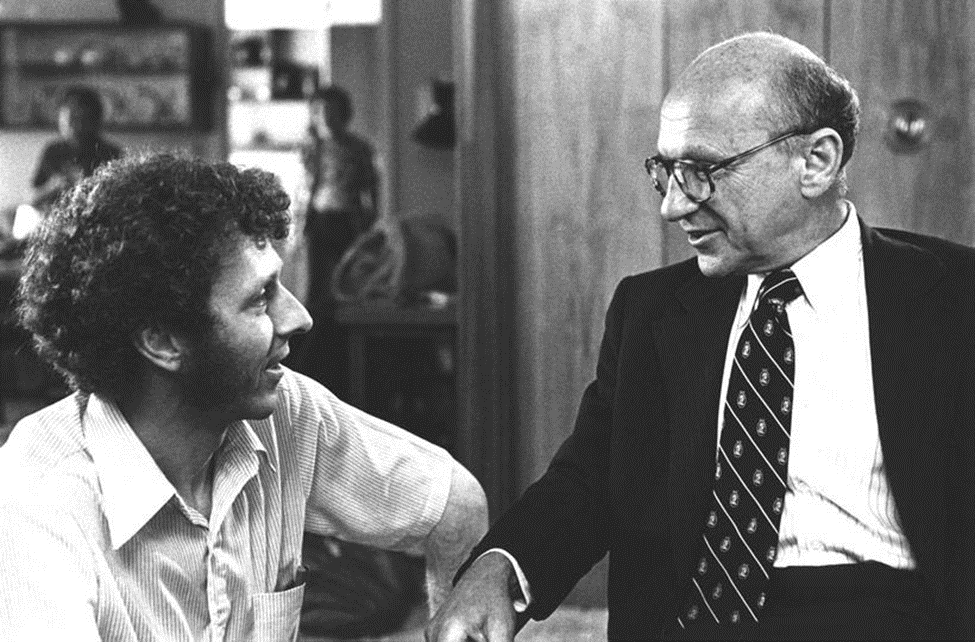
Chitester (left) and Friedman in 1978

In 1976, Bob Chitester, the president of WQLN-TV, a public television station in Erie, Pennsylvania, planned to produce a seminar on society and technology. His conversations with Edward E. David Jr., who had served as science advisor to President Richard Nixon, and W. Allen Wallis, chancellor of the University of Rochester, led Chitester to Milton Friedman, the recipient of the Nobel Memorial Prize in Economic Sciences that year. After reading Capitalism and Freedom, which Friedman wrote in the 1950s, and which was published in 1962, Chitester proposed a television series with Friedman. With Wallis' assistance, Chitester and Friedman raised $2.8 million to produce a ten-part series of one-hour programs. All of the funding for the series came from private outside sources. Contributions to the project included $500,000 from the Sarah Scaife Foundation, $300,000 from the Reader's Digest Association, $250,000 from the John M. Olin Foundation, and $240,000 from Getty Oil. General Motors and Bechtel also funded the series.

Free to Choose served as a response to The Age of Uncertainty, a 1977 television series written and presented by economist John Kenneth Galbraith, and broadcast by the BBC. Chitester later related that before Free to Choose, television programming about free markets had been "muckraking attacks on what was perceived to be abusive and unsympathetic…capitalism, where profit was all that mattered."

Free to Choose was produced by Video Arts Television, located in London. Ralph Harris, a British economist who was head of the Institute of Economic Affairs (IEA), had known Friedman from the Mont Pelerin Society (MPS), and provided a connection to Video Arts Television. The series was filmed from March to November 1978, in locations around the world including Great Britain, India, Japan, Berlin, Hong Kong, New York City, Washington, D.C., Berkeley, California, and Ottumwa, Iowa. Free to Choose first aired on January 11, 1980, on KRMA, a PBS station in Denver. The series was later translated into over 20 languages.

== Format and content ==
Each hour-long episode of the ten-part 1980 series has two parts. The first is a documentary film in which Friedman presents a history of and his views on economic topics including: free markets, protectionism and tariffs, the Great Depression and its causes, welfare spending, freedom and equality, education in the United States, consumer protection, labor unions, inflation, and government bureaucracy. In these films, he argues that the Depression was not a failure of capitalism; that government welfare programs, agricultural subsidies, and the regulations of consumer goods often have perverse effects; and that free trade contributes more to prosperity and peace than government intervention. In the second part of the first nine episodes of the series, the documentary portion is followed by a discussion held at the University of Chicago and moderated by Robert McKenzie. There Friedman and four guests, selected from academia, business, government, and the media, debate the topics broached in the film. The tenth and final episode of the series concludes with a conversation between Friedman and Lawrence Spivak.

== Cast ==
- Milton Friedman, host of all ten episodes in 1980
- Robert McKenzie, moderator of the debate portion of the first nine episodes in 1980
- Lawrence Spivak, interviewer of Friedman in episode 10, "How to Stay Free"

=== Guest debaters ===
- Gregory Anrig (commissioner of Massachusetts Department of Education) – episode 6
- Jagdish Bhagwati (economist) – episode 2
- William H. Brady (founder and president of W.H. Brady Co.) – episode 8
- Bud Brown (politician) – episode 9
- Joan Claybrook (administrator of the National Highway Traffic Safety Administration) – episode 7
- Barber Conable (politician, president of the World Bank) – episode 1
- John Coons (law professor, school choice activist) – episode 6
- Robert Crandall (Brookings Institution economist) – episode 7
- Richard Deason (International Brotherhood of Electrical Workers leader) – episode 2
- James R. Dumpson (bureaucrat, social worker) – episode 4
- Otmar Emminger (president of Deutsche Bundesbank) – episode 9
- Bob Galvin (CEO of Motorola, Inc.) – episode 1
- Ernest Green (U.S. Assistant Secretary of Labor) – episode 8
- Michael Harrington (author, academic, activist) – episode 1
- Nicholas von Hoffman (journalist, political commentator) – episode 3
- Helen Hughes (economist) – episode 2
- Peter Jay (economist, journalist, diplomat) – episodes 3, 5
- Robert Lampman (economist) – episode 4
- Richard L. Landau (medical professor) – episode 7
- Robert Lekachman (economist) – episode 3
- William McChesney Martin (former chair of the Federal Reserve) – episode 9
- Helen O'Bannon (economist, bureaucrat, social worker) – episode 4
- Kathleen O'Reilly (advocate for Consumer Federation of America) – episode 7
- Russell W. Peterson (chemist, politician) – episode 1
- Frances Fox Piven (political scientist) – episode 5
- Donald Rumsfeld (politician, president of G. D. Searle & Company) – episode 2
- Albert Shanker (president of United Federation of Teachers and American Federation of Teachers teachers' unions) – episode 6
- Thomas Shannon (executive director of the National School Boards Association) – episode 6
- Thomas Sowell (economist, author, columnist) – episodes 4, 5
- Beryl Sprinkel (executive vice president of Harris Bank) – episode 9
- Peter Temin (economist) – episode 3
- Lynn R. Williams (international secretary of United Steelworkers) – episode 8
- Walter E. Williams (economist, political commentator) – episode 8

== Episodes ==
=== 1980 episodes ===
No.	Title	Directed by	Written by	Original release date
1	"The Power of the Market"	David Filkin, Graham Massey (film)	Milton Friedman	January 11, 1980
In the documentary film portion of the episode, Milton Friedman visits Hong Kong to discuss the territory's free trade policies and economic growth. He then returns to the University of Chicago for a debate moderated by Robert McKenzie, with Michael Harrington of the Democratic Socialist Organizing Committee; Russell W. Peterson, former Governor of Delaware; Bob Galvin, chairman of Motorola; and Barber Conable, United States Congressman and member of the United States House Committee on Ways and Means.
2	"The Tyranny of Control"	David Filkin, Graham Massey (film)	Milton Friedman	January 18, 1980
Friedman travels to Japan and India, comparing the former's economic growth in the decades following the Meiji Restoration to the latter's in the 30 years after its independence from the British. At the University of Chicago, he debates Richard Deason of the International Brotherhood of Electrical Workers (IBEW); Donald Rumsfeld, president of G. D. Searle & Company; Helen Hughes, director of economics studies at the World Bank; and Jagdish Bhagwati, professor of economics at the Massachusetts Institute of Technology (MIT).
3	"Anatomy of Crisis"	David Filkin, Graham Massey (film)	Milton Friedman	January 25, 1980
Friedman visits New York City to examine the Wall Street crash of 1929 and Great Depression that followed. He relates the failure of the Bank of United States, which collapsed in 1930 due to a bank run. Friedman argues that while others have attributed the cause of the Great Depression to a failure of capitalism, the central culprit was the government, the Federal Reserve, in particular, which failed to save the Bank of United States and other banks that collapsed after runs, despite having been designed to do exactly that by the Federal Reserve Act of 1913. He then explores this topic in conversation with Robert Lekachman, professor of economics at the City University of New York (CUNY); syndicated columnist Nicholas von Hoffman; Peter Temin, professor of economics of MIT; and Peter Jay, the British Ambassador to the United States from 1977 to 1979.
4	"From Cradle to Grave"	David Filkin, Graham Massey (film)	Milton Friedman	February 1, 1980
Friedman opens the documentary film portion of the episode in New York to explore the effects of rent control in the city. He moves upstate to the New York State Executive Mansion in Albany, New York to recount the meetings between Franklin D. Roosevelt, then Governor of New York, and various academics to formulate plans for a welfare state during the Great Depression. Friedman reviews the programs of the New Deal that were launched during Roosevelt's presidency, including the National Recovery Administration (NRA) and Social Security. Back in the The Bronx and across the Atlantic in Manchester, England, he explains the perverse incentives of the welfare trap. The ensuing discussion of the film includes James R. Dumpson, chief administrator of New York City's Human Resources Administration from 1974 to 1976; Thomas Sowell, professor of economics at the University of California, Los Angeles (UCLA); Robert Lampman, professor of economics at the Institute for Research on Poverty; and Helen O'Bannon, the secretary of welfare for Pennsylvania.
5	"Created Equal"	David Filkin, Graham Massey (film)	Milton Friedman	February 8, 1980
In the documentary portion, Friedman compares the notions of equal opportunity and equality of outcome. At Monticello in Virginia, he examines the life and work of Thomas Jefferson, highlighting the passage "all men are created equal" found in the United States Declaration of Independence. Friedman contrasts the Jeffersonian ideal that each individual is endowed with unalienable rights to "Life, Liberty and the pursuit of Happiness", another phrase found the Declaration of Independence, with the reality at that time of slavery in the United States, in which Jefferson was a life-long participant as a slave owner. The documentary moves to Jaipur, the capital of Rajasthan, where Friedman explains that India's planned economy in the three decades since the country's independence from Britain, has done little to deliver economic equality or to reduce poverty. The discussion participants in this episode are Frances Fox Piven, professor of political science at Boston University; Peter Jay, British Ambassador to the United States from 1977 to 1979; and Thomas Sowell, professor of economics at UCLA.
6	"What's Wrong with Our Schools?"	David Filkin, Graham Massey (film)	Milton Friedman	February 15, 1980
Friedman begins the documentary at Hyde Park High School in Boston, a one-room school in Vermont, and Weston High School in Weston, Massachusetts, a suburb of Boston, to examine public education in the United States. He then goes to New York City to attend a fundraiser for the Inner-City Scholarship Fund, and to visit St John Chrysostom's School in the Bronx, a school supported by the fund, as well as Harlem Preparatory School in the Harlem neighborhood of Manhattan. The documentary moves on to an elementary school in San Jose, California and the Newtown Primary School, located in Ashford, Kent of South East England to investigate school choice and school vouchers. Friedman then visits Dartmouth College and UCLA to explore private and public higher education in the United States. Back in Chicago, he discusses these topics with Albert Shanker, president of the American Federation of Teachers (AFT); professor John Coons of the Initiative for Family Choice in Education in California; Thomas Shannon, executive director of the National School Boards Association (NSBA); and Gregory Anrig, commissioner of Massachusetts Department of Education.
7	"Who Protects the Consumer?"	David Filkin, Graham Massey (film)	Milton Friedman	February 22, 1980
The documentary opens with a segment on the Chevrolet Corvair, an automobile produced in the 1960s, which consumer advocate Ralph Nader argued was dangerous in his book, Unsafe at Any Speed. This introduces Friedman's exploration of the rise in government regulation of consumer goods. In Washington, D.C., he visits the Library of Congress to illustrate the growth of the Federal Register, a record of the regulations and proceeding of federal bureaucracies. The documentary depicts the extensive testing of the consumer products conducted by the newly-created Consumer Product Safety Commission (CPSC). Friedman argues that the regulations coming out of government bureaucracies like the CPSC has increased costs and reduced choice for the consumer, and that the market is more efficient at delivering quality products at a competitive price. Friedman then gives a history of the regulation of the railroad industry in the United States and the creation, in the late 1800s, of the Interstate Commerce Commission (ICC), which regulated railroads and, beginning int he 1930s, the trucking industry as well. Here again, Friedman argues that government regulation has reduced competition among suppliers and increased costs to the consumers of freight transport. He debates this topic with Kathleen O'Reilly, a consumer advocate of the Consumer Federation of America (CFA); Richard L. Landau, professor of medicine at the University of Chicago; Joan Claybrook of the National Highway Traffic Safety Administration (NHTSA); and Robert Crandall of the Brookings Institution.
8	"Who Protects the Worker?"	David Filkin, Graham Massey (film)	Milton Friedman	February 29, 1980
Friedman travels to the Greek island of Kos to trace the origins of labor unions to the Hippocratic Oath, which he argues introduced a closed shop in medicine. In California, he explores tensions between medical doctors and paramedics. In Washington, D.C., Friedman visits the Committee on Education and Labor, a committee of the United States House of Representatives where American labor legislation is developed, including minimum wage law. He contrasts the labor protections afforded to civil servants of the federal government, many who live in Montgomery County, Maryland, one of the highest-income counties in the United States, with the dynamic job opportunities in the tech industries of Silicon Valley. Elsewhere in California, Friedman delves into the labor market in agriculture fraught by political conflicts over illegal immigration from the Mexican border. Finally, he explains the rise of industry in Spartanburg, South Carolina driven by lower taxes and the easing of labor regulations. Back at the University of Chicago, Friedman debates these topics with Lynn R. Williams of United Steelworkers; Walter E. Williams, a professor of economics at Temple University; Ernest Green, assistant secretary of the United States Department of Labor; and William H. Brady, president of the Brady Corporation.
9	"How to Cure Inflation"	David Filkin, Graham Massey (film)	Milton Friedman	March 7, 1980
The documentary begins in Bodie, California, once a gold rush boomtown and later a ghost town in the Sierra Nevada, and then on a tobacco farm to give a brief history of money. Friedman examines inflation in the United Kingdom and the United States during the 1960s and 1970s. He rejects arguments that labor unions, international trade, and oil prices drive inflation. Moving to Germany in the wake of World War II, Friedman recounts the Currency Reform of 1948, in which Ludwig Erhard introduced the Deutsche Mark, and West Germany's ensuing economy recovery, known as the Wirtschaftswunder. Comparing West Germany to its socialist counterpart, East Germany, Friedman attributes the former's success to economic freedom. Returning to Washington D.C., Friedman visits the Bureau of Engraving and Printing, where Federal Reserve Notes, the paper bills of the United States dollar, are printed. He concludes that inflation is caused by government increases to the money supply. Friedman discusses these topics with U.S. congressman Bud Brown; Beryl Sprinkel, executive vice president of the Harris Bank; Otmar Emminger, president of Deutsche Bundesbank; and William McChesney Martin, chair of the Federal Reserve.
10	"How to Stay Free"	David Filkin, Graham Massey (film)	Milton Friedman	March 14, 1980
At the United States Capitol in Washington, D.C., Friedman evaluates interaction and deal-making between legislators and the lobbyists who represent special interest groups. At Independence Hall in Philadelphia, where the Constitution of the United States was written, Friedman compares the limited government advanced by the Constitution with the rise of bureaucracy and taxation during the middle of the 20th century. He traces the increase in government size and power to the New Deal policies of the Great Depression. Friedman visits the Department of Health, Education, and Welfare (HEW), noting its massive budget as well as sizable levels of waste and fraud. Friedman references the invisible hand, a metaphor advanced by Adam Smith, to explain that free markets may include self-interested agents in the public interest, while arguing that government regulation can have the opposite effect, where intentions to benefit the public may serve only a select set of private interests. After the documentary portion of the episode, Friedman discusses its topics with Lawrence Spivak.

=== 1990 episodes ===
Friedman giving a lecture about a pencil in episode 1, "The Power of the Market"

1. "The Power of the Market" – introduction by Arnold Schwarzenegger; debate with David Brooks of the The Wall Street Journal and James K. Galbraith, economist from the University of Texas at Austin
2. "The Tyranny of Control" – introduction by George Shultz; debate with Michael Walker, economist from the Fraser Institute, and Stephen S. Cohen, economist from the University of California, Berkeley
3. "Freedom and Prosperity" (featured only in the 1990 version) – introduction by Ronald Reagan; debate with Gary Becker, economist from the University of Chicago, and Samuel Bowles, economist from the University of Massachusetts Amherst
4. "The Failure of Socialism" (original title: "What's Wrong With Our Schools?") – introduction by David D. Friedman; debate with Gordon Tullock, economist from the University of Arizona, and Henry Levin, education economist from Stanford University
5. "Created Equal" – introduction by Steve Allen; debate with Thomas Sowell of the Hoover Institution and Michael Kinsley of the The New Republic

== Reception and legacy ==
Free to Choose received largely positive reviews. When the series was re-run in 1981, on WNET, a PBS station serving the New York City area, John J. O'Connor reviewed the series favorably in the The New York Times. He wrote that Friedman had a "persuasive donnish manner", and that in the debate portion of the series, "Impressive points are scored on all sides." O'Connor concluded, "In the end, the viewer should be left with a valuable sense of the sheer complexity of the subject. Whatever else, the issues are clearly drawn. Given today's headlines, that makes Free to Choose important television."

In the years following the release of Free to Choose, Friedman remained committed to making the series available to high school and college students. The Americanism Educational League purchased video copies of the series, and lent them at no cost to over 100 institutions of higher learning. Friedman later secured the rights to the series, making it available for sale on videocassette at a minimal price. In 2003, the Federal Reserve Bank of Dallas sponsored a conference on the legacy and future implications of Free to Choose. In a review of Jennifer Burns's 2023 biography, Milton Friedman: The Last Conservative, Jennifer Szalai, writing in The New York Times, tied Friedman's celebrity to the 1980 series, particularly the iconic scene in which Friedman holds a pencil to explain "the magic of the price system."
