= Free to Choose Network =

American nonprofit media organization

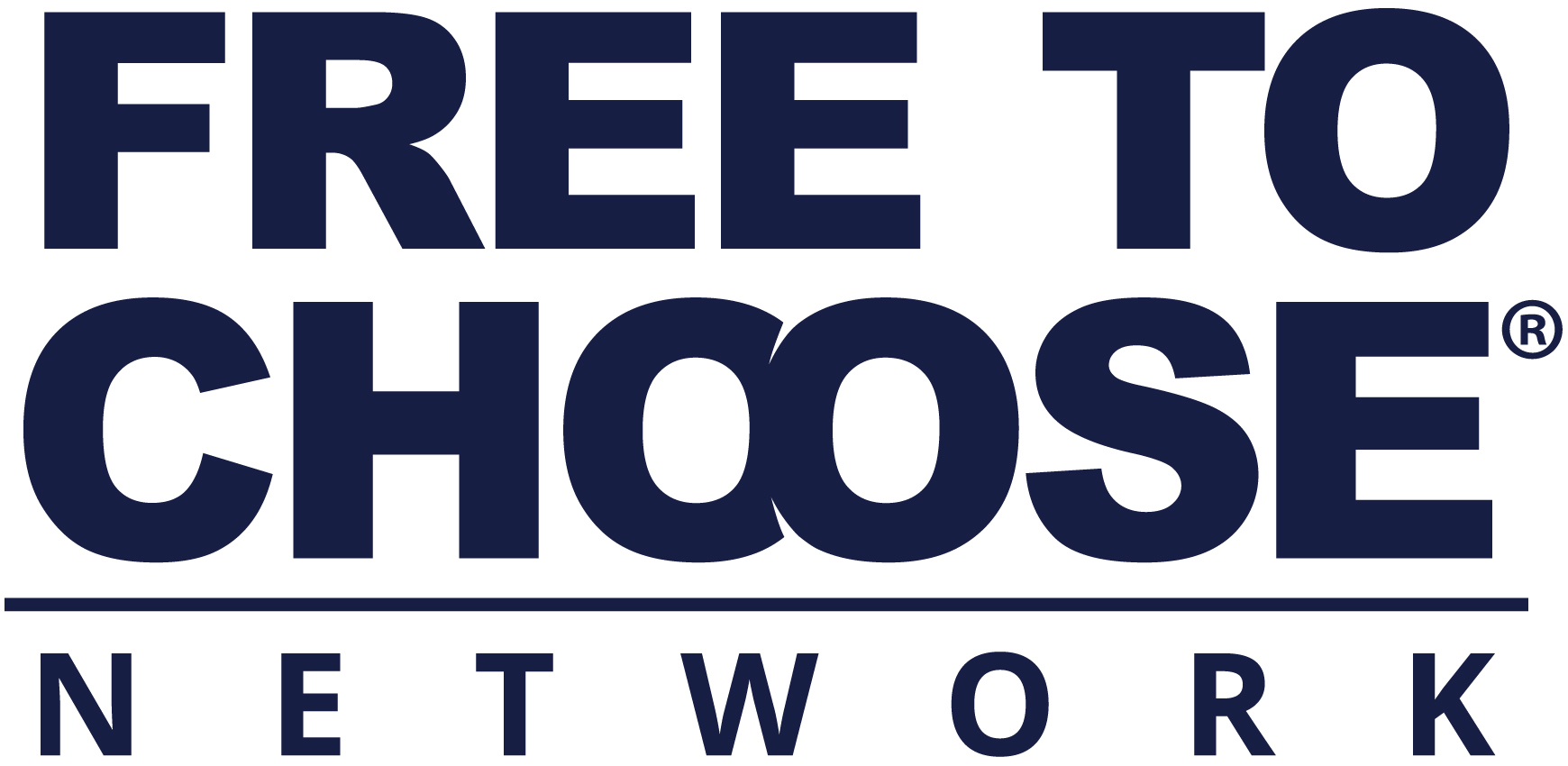
- Founder: Bob Chitester
- Headquarters: 2002 Filmore Avenue Erie, PA 16506
- President and CEO: Robert Chatfield
- Senior executive producer: Thomas Skinner
- Website: www.freetochoosenetwork.org

Free to Choose Network is a libertarian nonprofit corporation headquartered in Erie, Pennsylvania.

Free to Choose Network has two main initiatives: Free to Choose Media, which produces television programs and videos making classical liberal economic and political ideas accessible to a popular audience and izzit.org, which produces media for K–12 audience, sometimes adapting public television broadcasts for public school use.

Free to Choose Network was founded by Bob Chitester. At the time of Free to Choose Network's founding, Chitester was the general manager of two public broadcasters in Erie, Pennsylvania: the PBS channel WQLN-TV and the NPR station WQLN-FM.

== History ==
The origins of the foundation lay in PBS's broadcast of The Age of Uncertainty (1975), a 13-part BBC series produced by Canadian-American liberal economist John Kenneth Galbraith. The chairman of the Corporation for Public Broadcasting was a classical liberal economist, W. Allen Wallis, who had met Chitester in 1975 when he participated in a symposium on "Technology and Society" arranged by Chitester in Erie and learned that Chitester shared his classical liberal economic views. They both believed that PBS should produce a classical liberal response to The Age of Uncertainty. Wallis therefore introduced Chitester to his friend Milton Friedman in early 1977 (shortly after Friedman won the Nobel Memorial Prize in Economic Sciences). As a result, Chitester raised the necessary funding and executive produced a 10-part PBS series entitled Free to Choose, which first aired in early 1980. Friedman also co-authored a book with his wife Rose Friedman based on the television series, also called Free to Choose. The book spent 5 weeks at the top of the New York Times Non-Fiction Best Sellers List in 1980.

It was in the context of producing the series that Chitester first organized Amagin, Inc., which ultimately became Free to Choose Network. Under the trademark Free to Choose Media it continues to produce media describing classical liberal economic ideas to a mass audience. Beginning in 1999, the network was licensed by ABC News to distribute John Stossel TV specials under the brand "Stossel in the Classroom". The license was cancelled in 2004.

== Projects ==
The organization has produced a number of programs for public TV including: a biography of Milton Friedman, entitled The Power of Choice – The Ultimate Resource (named after the 1981 book The Ultimate Resource by Julian Lincoln Simon) – Turmoil and Triumph a biography of George Shultz – The Power of the Poor, hosted by Peruvian economist Hernando de Soto – India Awakes, hosted by Swedish scholar Johan Norberg – The Real Adam Smith, hosted by Johan Norberg, "A More Or Less Perfect Union" hosted by United States district court judge, Douglas H. Ginsburg, and most recently, "Thomas Sowell: Common Sense in a Senseless World," hosted by Norberg.

The Izzit.org initiative was originally called In the Classroom Media. Izzit.org provides teachers with materials on current events and other topics for in-classroom use. Much of the Idea Channel archival footage now appears on YouTube.
