= Bob Chitester =

American television executive and producer (1937–2021)

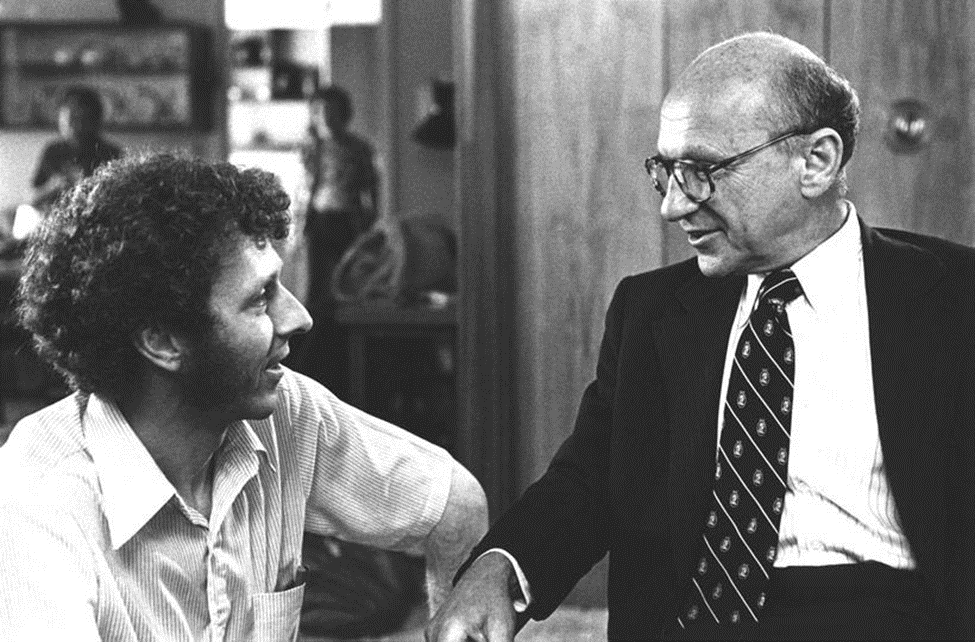
- Bob Chitester and Milton Friedman during the pre-filming of the 1980 series Free to Choose
- Born: October 30, 1937; Pennsylvania, U.S.
- Died: May 8, 2021 (aged 83); Erie, Pennsylvania, U.S.
- Education: University of Michigan, B.A. and M.A.

Bob Chitester (October 30, 1937 – May 8, 2021) was an American television executive and producer, best known for creating the ten-part series starring economist Milton Friedman called Free to Choose.

== Biography ==
Chitester was born in 1937 in rural Pennsylvania, son of a lineman named Palmer R. Chitester. Chitester attended the University of Michigan for both his B.A. as well as M.A. degrees in media, radio and television. Chitester created the first public television station in Erie, Pennsylvania, in the late 1960s, and called it WQLN for "Question and Learn." In the mid-1970's, Chitester became interested in making a counter series to the program hosted by left-liberal economist John Kenneth Galbraith, which was called The Age of Uncertainty and first aired in 1977.

Chitester approached recent Nobel laureate economist Milton Friedman in 1977 about making a program of this type, and Friedman agreed, with filming beginning c. 1978 and culminating in the production of a ten-hour show titled, Free to Choose which went on to be one of PBS's most watched programs. Free to Choose was accompanied by a best-selling book of 1980 of the same name.

In Chitester's later years, he went on to found the Free To Choose Network (FTCN), and created a high number of programs intended for public television distribution as well as release on platforms such as YouTube.

An article from The Wall Street Journal praised Chitester's work in creating Free to Choose, and in particular in launching economist Milton Friedman to stardom. The Wall Street Journal went further in stating that the influence that the Free to Choose program had on the Reagan administration was immense, as well as the effect the program had on the public-at-large by popularizing capitalism and free market ideas to millions of television viewers well in to the 1980s: "Bob Chitester's 1980 PBS series 'Free to Choose' helped make capitalism popular."

Chitester was known as a lone independent thinker in his beliefs as a general manager of a public television station, "Mr. Chitester was probably the only PBS or NPR station manager who didn't believe public radio and television should receive subsidies from American taxpayers."

At the age of 83, following a seven-year battle with cancer, Chitester died in Erie, Pennsylvania.

== Awards ==
Bob received the Sir Antony Fisher Lifetime Achievement Award in 2016 from the Atlas Network.

== Filmography ==
- Free to Choose: 1980 ten-hour, ten-part series starring Milton Friedman – executive producer
- The Power of Choice: The Life and Ideas of Milton Friedman – 2007
- The Ultimate Resource – 2007
- The Power of the Poor – 2009
- Turmoil & Triumph: The George Shultz Years – 2010 – starring Secretary of State under Ronald Reagan, George Shultz
- Europe's Debt: America's Crisis? – 2012
- Free or Equal – 2015
- Testing Milton Friedman: Equality of Opportunity – 2012
- Globalization at the Crossroads – 2011
- Economic Freedom in Action: Changing Lives – 2013
- Walter Williams: Suffer No Fools – 2014
- Unlikely Heroes of the Arab Spring – 2013
- Power to the People – 2015
- India Awakes with Johan Norberg – 2015
- Trailblazers: The New Zealand Story – 2017
- The Real Adam Smith: Morality and Markets – 2016
- School Inc. Episode 1: The Price of Excellence – 2016
- Is America in Retreat? – 2017
- Work & Happiness: The Human Cost of Welfare – 2017
- The Price of Peace – 2018
- Sweden: Lessons for America? – 2018
- A More or Less Perfect Union Episode 1 – A Constitution In Writing – 2020
- Thomas Sowell: Common Sense in a Senseless World – 2020

== See also ==
- Thomas Skinner (television executive)
