= WQLN =

WQLN may refer to:

- WQLN (TV), a television station (channel 27, virtual 54) licensed to Erie, Pennsylvania, United States
- WQLN-FM, a radio station (91.3 FM) licensed to Erie, Pennsylvania, United States
