= Fox 66 =

Fox 66 may refer to:

- WFXP in Erie, Pennsylvania
- WSMH in Flint, Michigan
