= The Ascent of Man =

BBC documentary television series by Jacob Bronowski (1973)

- DVD cover
- Genre: Documentary
- Developed by: David Attenborough
- Directed by: Adrian Malone, Dick Gilling, Mick Jackson, David Caird Paterson and David John Kennard
- Presented by: Jacob Bronowski
- Country of origin: United Kingdom
- Original language: English
- No. of episodes: 13

Production
- Producers: Adrian Malone and Dick Gilling
- Production location: Worldwide (27 countries)
- Running time: 593 minutes (49 minutes per episode)

Original release
- Release: 5 May 1973 – July 28, 1973

The Ascent of Man is a 13-part British documentary television series produced by the BBC and Time-Life Films first broadcast in 1973. It was written and presented by Polish-British mathematician and historian of science Jacob Bronowski, who also authored a book adaptation. Intended as a series of "personal view" documentaries in the manner of Kenneth Clark's 1969 series Civilisation, the series received acclaim for Bronowski's highly informed but eloquently simple analysis, his long, elegant monologues, and its extensive location shoots.

The programme began broadcasting on BBC2 at 9 pm on Saturday, 5 May 1973 and was released in the US on 7 January 1975. To celebrate its 50th anniversary, the documentary was again broadcast on BBC4 in the Summer of 2023.

== Overview ==
The title alludes to The Descent of Man (1871), Charles Darwin's second book on evolution. Over the series' 13 episodes, Jacob Bronowski travels around the world in order to trace the development of human society through its understanding of science. It was commissioned specifically to complement Kenneth Clark's Civilisation (1969), in which Clark argued that art reflected and was informed by the major driving forces in cultural evolution. Bronowski had written in his 1951 book The Commonsense of Science: "It has been one of the most destructive modern prejudices that art and science are different and somehow incompatible interests". Both series were commissioned by David Attenborough, then director of programmes for BBC Television, whose colleague Aubrey Singer had been astonished by Attenborough prioritising an arts series (i.e. Civilisation) given his science background.

Bronowski's book adaptation of the series, The Ascent of Man (1973), is an almost word-for-word transcript from the television episodes, diverging from the original narration only where the lack of images might make its meaning unclear. A few details of the film version were omitted from the book, notably from episode 11, "Knowledge or Certainty".

== Production ==
The 13-part series was shot on 16 mm film. Executive producer was Adrian Malone; film directors were Dick Gilling, Mick Jackson, David Kennard, and David Paterson. Quotations were read by actors Roy Dotrice and Joss Ackland. Series music was by Dudley Simpson with Brian Hodgson and the BBC Radiophonic Workshop. Additional music includes work by Pink Floyd and the Moody Blues, among others. Apart from Bronowski, the only other named people appearing are the sculptor Henry Moore, and an elderly Polish man, Stefan Borgrajewicz. In Episode 11, Borgrajewicz's face is explored in different ways as a means of testing the limits of knowledge; via different wavelengths of the electromagnetic spectrum, a set of paintings by Feliks Topolski, and by the descriptions of a blind woman feeling his face at the beginning of the programme. Her description of his face as having "lines of possible agony" is clarified at the very end of the episode, which reveals him to have been a survivor of Auschwitz.

== Distribution ==
The complete series was digitally remastered and released on DVD in 2007 by Ambrose Video Publishing, Inc.

== Episodes ==
1. Lower than the Angels – Evolution of humans from proto-ape to the modern form 400,000 years ago.
2. The Harvest of the Seasons – Early human migration, agriculture and the first settlements, and war.
3. The Grain in the Stone – Tools, and the development of architecture and sculpture.
4. The Hidden Structure – Fire, metals and alchemy.
5. Music of the Spheres – The language of numbers and mathematics.
6. The Starry Messenger – Galileo's universe—and the implications of his trial on the shift to "northern" science.
7. The Majestic Clockwork – Explores Newton and Einstein's laws.
8. The Drive for Power – The Industrial Revolution and the effect on everyday life.
9. The Ladder of Creation – Darwin and Wallace's ideas on the origin of species.
10. World within World – The story of the periodic table—and of the atom.
11. Knowledge or Certainty – Physics and the clash of the pursuit of absolute vs. imperfect knowledge, and the misgivings of the scientists realising the terrible outcome of the conflict. Auschwitz. Hiroshima and Nagasaki.
12. Generation upon Generation – The joys of life, sex and genetics—and the dark side of cloning.
13. The Long Childhood – Bronowski's treatise on the commitment of humanity.

== Legacy ==
- Adrian Malone and David Kennard later emigrated to Hollywood, where they produced Carl Sagan's Cosmos (1980).
- Mick Jackson went on to direct the 1978 TV series Connections and, later, feature films including The Bodyguard.
- The Ascent of Man was placed 65th on a list of the 100 Greatest British Television Programmes voted for by industry professionals and drawn up by the British Film Institute in 2000.
- Charlie Brooker praises Bronowski and The Ascent of Man in his BBC Four programme Charlie Brooker's Screenwipe.

== See also ==
- The Age of Uncertainty – 1977 book and television series produced by John Kenneth Galbraith
- The Shock of the New – 1980 BBC TV series on the development of modern art
- Civilisation – British documentary TV series on Western art and philosophy (BBC 1969)
