= Helen Hughes (economist) =

Australian economist

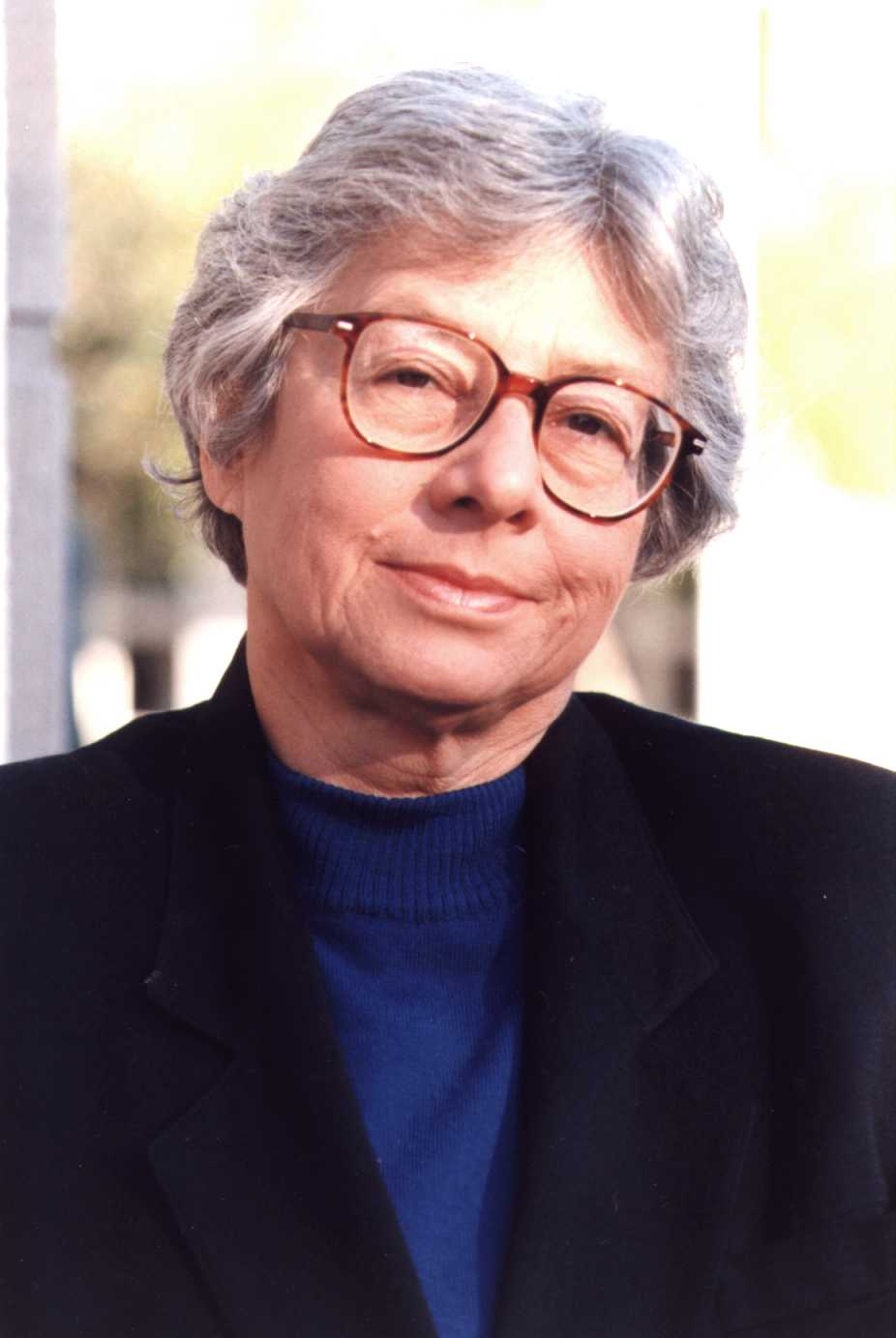
- Born: 1 October 1928; Prague, Czechoslovakia
- Died: 15 June 2013 (aged 84); Sydney, New South Wales
- Awards: Distinguished Fellow, Economic Society of Australia (2004); Centenary Medal (2001); Doctor of Letters (honoris causa) La Trobe University (1994); Officer of the Order of Australia (1985)

Academic background
- Education: University of Melbourne; London School of Economics
- Thesis: Effects of Technological Change on Labour in selected sections of the Iron and Steel Industries of Great Britain, the United States, and Germany, 1901 – 1939 (1954)

Academic work
- Institutions: Centre for Independent Studies (2000–13); Australian National University (1983–93); World Bank (1969–83); Australian National University (1963–68); University of Queensland (1961–62); University of New South Wales (1959–60)
- Notable students: Bill Hayden
- Main interests: Development Economics
- Notable works: The Australian Iron and Steel Industry, Lands of Shame

Helen Dolly Hughes AO FASSA (1 October 1928 – 15 June 2013) was an Australian economist. She was Professor Emerita at the Australian National University, Canberra, and Senior Fellow at the Centre for Independent Studies, Sydney. Hughes has been described as Australia's greatest female economist.

== Biography ==
=== Early life ===
Born Helen Gintz into a Jewish family on 1 October 1928, in Prague, Czechoslovakia, she lived until 1939 in Česká Třebová. Hughes migrated with her parents to Melbourne in 1939, where she lived at North Brighton

=== Education ===
Helen attended Elsternwick Primary School and Mac.Robertson Girls' High School. She completed a BA (Hons) from the University of Melbourne in 1949, winning the Marion Boothby Exhibition in British History in 1947 and 1st Place in General History in 1948. She received an MA (Hons) from Melbourne University in 1951. Her dissertation on the history of the Australian steel industry was later published as her first book. She completed her PhD at the London School of Economics in 1954.

=== Marriage and children ===
Hughes was married twice. She had two sons by her first marriage to Ian Hughes. In 1975 she married Graeme Dorrance, an economist at the International Monetary Fund, Washington, DC.

=== Death ===
Hughes died in Sydney from complications following surgery on 15 June 2013.

== Career ==
=== Employment ===
- 1955–1958 Business economist, Melbourne.
- 1959–1960 Lecturer in economics, University of New South Wales.
- 1961–1962 Senior Lecturer in economics, University of Queensland.
- 1963–1968 Research Fellow – Senior Fellow, Department of Economics, Research School of Pacific Studies, Australian National University.
- 1969-1983 The World Bank
  - 1976–1983 Director, Economic Analysis Department.
  - 1973–1975 Deputy Director, Development Economics Department.
  - 1971–1973 Division Chief, Industry Division.
  - 1969–1970 Senior Economist, Industry Division
- 1983–1993 Professor of Economics and Executive Director, National Centre for Development Studies, Research School of Pacific Studies, Australian National University.
  - 1987–1993 Member, United Nations Committee for Development Planning.
  - 1984–1992 Director, International Development Program.
  - 1983–1991 Director, Aussat Pty Ltd.
  - 1986–1991 Member of the Board of Management, Asian Pacific Development Centre.
  - 1989–1991 Member, National Advisory Committee on Skills Recognition.
- 1987–1995 Director, National Mutual Life Association of Australasia.
- 1993–1995 Professorial Fellow, Institute of Applied Economic and Social Research; Asia Business Centre and Director, The Full Employment Project, University of Melbourne.
- 1998–1999 Chair, Advisory Council, Asian Development Bank Institute, Tokyo.
- 2003–2006 Member, Australian Foreign Affairs Council.
- 1993–2013 Emeritus Professor, Australian National University, Visiting Fellow, Department of Economics, Research School of Pacific and Asian Studies.
- 2000–2013 Senior Fellow, Centre for Independent Studies.

In 1985 Hughes presented the Australian Broadcasting Corporation (ABC) Boyer Lectures – 'Australia in a Developing World'. In 1983 she was appointed by the Australian Foreign Minister Bill Hayden as deputy chair of the Jackson Committee, which reported on foreign aid for the Australian government. She was also a member of the Australian Government's Fitzgerald Committee on Immigration: A Commitment to Australia. Hughes was a member of the United Nations Committee for Development Planning from 1987 to 1993. In 1980 Hughes appeared as a World Bank economist on a panel moderated by Robert McKenzie featuring Donald Rumsfeld, Jagdish Bhagwati, and Richard Deason (an IBEW union leader) as part of the Milton Friedman's PBS documentary Free to Choose.

Hughes' later research focused on economic development problems facing the Pacific Island nations and remote Indigenous Australian communities in Australia. Her last book, Lands of Shame, was about Aboriginal and Torres Strait Islander 'Homelands' and reviewed demographic trends, law and order, land rights, joblessness and welfare, education, health, housing and governance, and assessed Commonwealth, State and Territory Indigenous policies. It was published by the Centre for Independent Studies.

=== Honours ===
- 1985 Fellow of the Academy of the Social Sciences in Australia.
- 1985 Officer of the Order of Australia for "service to international relations, particularly in the field of economics".
- 1994 Doctor of Letters (honoris causa) La Trobe University.
- 2001 Centenary Medal, for "service to economic policy, particularly poverty alleviation and economic development".
- 2004 Distinguished Fellow, Economic Society of Australia.

== Bibliography ==
=== Books ===
- 1964 The Australian Iron and Steel Industry, 1848–1962, Melbourne University Press, Melbourne.
- 1964 with M. Gough, B. J. McFarlane and G. R. Palmer, Queensland: Industrial Enigma, Melbourne University Press, Melbourne.
- 1969 with You Poh Seng, Foreign Investment and Industrialization in Singapore, Australian National University Press, Canberra, and Wisconsin University Press, Madison.
- 1973 (ed.) Prospects for Partnership: Industrialization and Trade Policies in the 1970s, IBRD, Johns Hopkins University Press, Baltimore.
- 1980 (ed.) with J. Cody and D. Wall, Policies for Industrial Progress in Developing Countries, IBRD, Oxford University Press, New York.
- 1983 (ed.) with Burton Weisbrod, Human Resources, Employment and Development, Vol. 3, Macmillan, London.
- 1983 with R. Bautista, D. Lim, D. Morawetz and F. Thoumi, Capital Utilization in Manufacturing in Developing Countries: IBRD, Oxford University Press, New York.
- 1985 Australia in a Developing World, 1985 Boyer Lectures, Australian Broadcasting Commission, Sydney.
- 1986 (ed.) Removing Constraints to Economic and Social Development, National Centre for Development Studies, Research School of Pacific Studies, ANU, Canberra.
- 1988 (ed). Achieving Industrialization in East Asia, Cambridge University Press, Cambridge.
- 1988 with Rodney Cole, The Fiji Economy, May 1987: problems and prospects, Pacific Policy Papers 4, National Centre for Development Studies, Canberra.
- 1992 (ed. Keberhasilan Industrialisasi di Asia Timur, Penerbit PT Gramedia Pustaka Utama, Jakarta.
- 1992 (ed.) The Dangers of Export Pessimism: developing country exports to industrial markets International Centre for Economic Growth.
- 1994 Achieving Full Employment, Full Employment Project, Melbourne University, November.
- 1996 with Graeme Dorrance, Divided Nation, Full Employment Project, Melbourne University,
- 1996 with Graeme Dorrance, Working Youth, Centre for Independent Studies, Sydney
- 2002 Immigrants, Refugees and Asylum Seekers: a global view, Centre for Independent Studies, Sydney
- 2007 Lands of Shame: Aboriginal and Torres Strait Islander 'Homelands' in transition, Sydney, Centre for Independent Studies.

=== Book chapters and occasional papers ===
- 'Markets, efficiency and ethics', in Can We Afford to Be Efficient?, St James Ethics Centre, Sydney.
- 1970 with P. Brown, 'The market structure of Australian manufacturing and tertiary industry, 1914 to 1963–64' in C. Forster, Australian Development in the Twentieth Century, Allen and Unwin, Sydney.
- 1971 'The manufacturing sector', in Southeast Asia's Economy in the 1970s, Asian Development Bank, Longman, London.
- 1972 'Assessment of policies towards direct foreign investment' in P. Drysdale (ed.), Direct Foreign Investment in Asia and the Pacific, Australian National University Press, Canberra.
- 1972 with Hollis B. Chenery, 'The international division of labour, the case of industry' in Towards a New World Economy, Rotterdam University Press, Rotterdam; also published in El Trimestre Economico (in Spanish), Vol. 39(3), July–Sept, No. 155.
- 1973 'Trade and industrialization policies: the political economy of the second best' in K. Kojima (ed.), Structural Adjustment in Asian Pacific Trade, The Japan Economic Research Center, Tokyo.
- 1973 with Hollis B. Chenery, 'Trade and industrialization: some issues for the seventies', in H. Hughes (ed.), Prospects for Partnership: Industrialization and Trade Policies in the 1970s, IBRD, Johns Hopkins University Press, Baltimore.
- 1974 'The scope for labour capital substitution in the developing economies of Southeast and East Asia' in L. White (ed.), Technology, Employment, and Development, Council for Asian Manpower Studies.
- 1976 'Technology transfer: the Australian experience' in Tamir Agmon and Charles P. Kindleberger, Multinationals from Small Countries, MIT Press, Cambridge, Ma.
- 1978 with John Shilling, 'Capital requirements for full employment and economic growth in developing countries' in Herbert Giersch (ed.), Capital Shortage and Unemployment in the World Economy, J. C. B. Mohr, Tübingen.
- 1980 'Achievements and objectives of industrialization', and with Goran Ohlin 'The International Environment' in J. Cody, H. Hughes and D. Wall (eds), Policies for Industrial Progress in Developing Countries, IBRD, Oxford University Press, New York.
- 1980 'North-South economic negotiations: a proposal for a more constructive agenda', in P. Oppenheimer (ed.), Issues in International Economics, Oriel Press, Stocksfield.
- 1980 'The prospects of ASEAN countries in industrialized country markets' in R. Garnaut (ed.), ASEAN in a Changing Pacific and World Economy, Australian National University Press, Canberra.
- 1981 'Changing relative energy prices, the balance of payments and growth in developing countries' in P. Auer and A. Manne (eds), Energy and the Developing Nations, Pergamon Press, New York.
- 1981 'Pessimism and a way out' in C. Saunders (ed.), The Political Economy of New and Old Industrial Countries, Butterworth & Co., London.
- 1981 with Ernest Lutz, 'The outlook for the 1980s with particular reference to trade' in H.G. Braun, H. Laumer, W. Liebfritz and H.C. Sherman (eds), Projections for the European Economy to 1990, IFO Institute for Economic Research, Munich.
- 1982 'Long run trends in the growth of developing countries' in R. M. Bautista and E. M. Pernia (eds), Essays in Development Economics in Honor of Harry T. Oshima, Philippine Institute for Development Studies, Manila.
- 1982 with Boris Blazic-Metzner, 'Growth experience of small economies' in Bimal Jalan (ed.), Problems and Policies in Small Economies, Croom Helm, London.
- 1983 'Inter-developing-country trade and employment' in H. Hughes and Burton Weisbrod (eds), Human Resources, Employment and Development, Vol. 3, Macmillan, London.
- 1983 'The risks of lending to developing countries' in R. J. Herring (ed.), Managing International Risk, Cambridge University Press, Cambridge.
- 1983 with Jean Waelbroeck, 'Foreign trade and structural adjustment – is there a threat of new protectionism' in H. G. Braun, H. Laumer, W. Leibfritz and H. C. Sherman (eds), The European Economy in the 1980s, Gower, Aldershot.
- 1984 'External debt problems of developing countries in Romeo M. Bautista and Seiji Naya (eds), Energy and Structural Change in the Asia Pacific Region, Philippine Institute for Development Studies/Asian Development Bank, Manila.
- 1984 with Anne O. Krueger, 'Effects of protection in developed countries on developing countries' exports of manufactures' in Robert E. Baldwin and Anne O. Krueger (eds), The Structure and Evolution of Recent United States Trade Policy, Chicago University Press, Chicago.
- 1985 'Australia and the world environment – the dynamics of international competition and wealth creation', in J. A. Scutt (ed.), Australia: Poor White Nation of the Pacific?, Allen and Unwin, Sydney.
- 1985 'Global forecasting and third world futures' in R. B. McKern and G. C. Lowenthal, Limits to Prediction, NSW Australian Professional Publications, Mosman.
- 1985 Policy Lessons of the Development Experience, Group of Thirty Occasional Papers No.16, New York.
- 1985 'Women in the development of the South Pacific', in Women in Development in the South Pacific. Barriers and Opportunities, National Centre for Development Studies, Research School of Pacific Studies, Australian National University, Canberra.
- 1986 'Capital needs of the developing countries in the eighties', in S. Borner and A. Taylor (eds), Structural Change, Economic Interdependence and World Development, Proceedings of the International Economic Association, Seventh World Congress, Madrid, 5–9 September 1983, Macmillan, London.
- 1986 'The political economy of protection in eleven industrial countries' in R. Snape (ed.), Issues in World Trade Policy, GATT at the Crossroads, Macmillan, London.
- 1986 with D. Ahlburg and Sun-hee Lee, 'Human resource development in Pacific developing countries' in ESCAP, Human Resources Development in Asia and the Pacific – Its Social Dimensions, Theme Study for the 42nd and 43rd Session of the Commission, ESCAP, Bangkok.
- 1987 with Graeme Dorrance, 'Economic policies and direct foreign investment with particular reference to the developing countries of East Asia' in V. Cable and B. Persaud, Developing with Foreign Investment, Croom Helm, London.
- 1988 Agricultural development growth and equity: 40 years of experience, Sir John Crawford Memorial Lecture, CGIAR, Washington.
- 1988 'Comments on John Fei's "Evolution of Development Policy"', in Gustav Ranis and T. P. Schultz, The State of Development Economics, Progress and Prospects, New York, Basil Blackwell.
- 1988 'Education as an export industry', in Hogbin, G. R. (ed), Withering heights: The state of higher education in Australia, Centre of Policy Studies, Allen & Unwin, Sydney.
- 1988 'The economic framework', in Marsh, I. C., Australia can compete: Towards a flexible, adaptable society, Longman Cheshire, Melbourne.
- 1988 'The role of aid and private capital inflows in economic development' in F. Holmes (ed.), Economic Adjustment: Policies and Problems, IMF, Washington.
- 1989 'Towards clarity and commonsense' in S Naya, M Urrutia, S Mark and A Fuentes (eds), Lessons in Development: experiences of Asian and Latin American countries, International Centre for Economic Growth, San Francisco.
- 1992 'Explaining the differences between the growth of developing countries in Asia and Latin America in the 1980s', in R Adhikari, C Kirkpatrick and J Weiss (eds) Industrial and Trade Policy Reform in Developing Countries, Manchester University Press, Manchester.
- 1993 'An external view' in Linda Low, Toh Mun Heng, Tan Kong Yam and Soon Teck Wong (eds.), Challenge and Response: Thirty Years of the Economic Development Board, Times Academic Press, Singapore
- 1993 'Has there been a miracle in the developing economies of East Asia?', in L. Stetting, K. E. Svendsen and E. Yndgaard (eds), Global Change and Transformation: Economic Essays in Honor of Karsten Laursen, Handelshojskolens Forlag, Copenhagen.
- 1993 'The export policies of East Asian countries', in Integration of the Ukraine into the World Economy, World Bank and the Ministry of Finance of Ukraine, Kyiv and Washington (mimeo)
- 1993 'The Policy Context', in L. Mallery (ed), Policies and Strategies for Livestock Development, Proceedings of the Regional Seminar, 18–22 January 1993, Asian Development Bank, Manila.
- 1994 'Australia and Asia: A relationship or just good friends', Australia's Asian Challenge, The Centre for Independent Studies, Sydney, November.
- 1994 'Exporting education: retrospect and prospect', in P. Thomas (ed), Teaching for Development, An International review of Australian formal and non-formal education for Asia and the Pacific, Canberra.
- 1994 'Adaptability of Asian countries to policy changes in Western Europe', in V. Ginsburgh and M. Dewatripont (eds.), Europe 1992 and Beyond: Proceedings of a conference in honour of Jean Waelbroeck, Universite Libre de Bruxelles, 24–25 Jan 1992, North Holland, Amsterdam.
- 1994 'Development policies and development performance', in E. Grilli and D. Salvatore (eds.), Handbook of Economic Development, Greenwood Press, Westport CT, and North Holland, Amsterdam.
- 1994 with Ruel Abello, '10 years after Jackson: Whither aid policy in the 1990s, in Retrospective on Australian Aid, Canberra.
- 1995 with Berhanu Woldekidan, 'Improving social welfare in developing countries: a fifty year perspective', in S. Dodds (ed.), Individual and Social Wellbeing: Perspectives on sustainable development, Oxford University Press, London.
- 1998 Equal Pay for Work of Equal Value Moving toward, or away from, wage justice for women? Issue Analysis No 2, Centre for Independent Studies, Sydney
- 1999 with Ian Harper and Samuel Gregg, Noble Ends, Flawed Means: The Case Against Debt Forgiveness, Issue Analysis No 8, Centre for Independent Studies, Sydney
- 1999 with Jason Soon, Why Small Business Is Not Hiring: Regulatory Impediments To Small Business Growth, Issue Analysis No 6, Centre for Independent Studies, Sydney
- 2001 The evolution of dual economies in East Asia in D. Lal and R. H. Snape, eds, Trade, Development and Political Economy, Essays in Honour of Anne O. Kreuger, Palgrave, St. Martin's Press, Houndmills, Basingstoke, Hampshire and 175 Fifth Avenue, New York, N.Y.
- 2002 with Peter Saunders, Poor Arguments: A Response To The Smith Family Report On Poverty In Australia, Issue Analysis No 21, Centre for Independent Studies, Sydney
- 2003 Aid Has failed the Pacific, Issue Analysis,33, The Centre for Independent Studies, Sydney
- 2004 Can Papua New Guinea come back from the brink? Issue Analysis, 49, the Centre for Independent Studies, Sydney
- 2004 From riches to rags: what are Nauru's options and how can Australia help? Issue Analysis, 50, The Centre for Independent Studies, Sydney
- 2004 The Pacific is viable! Issue Analysis, No 53, The Centre for Independent Studies, Sydney
- 2005 The economics of Indigenous deprivation and proposals for reform, Issue Analysis No 63, The Centre for Independent Studies, Sydney.
- 2005 with Jenness Warin, A new deal for Aborigines and Torres Strait Islanders in remote communities, Issue Analysis, No 54, The Centre for Independent Studies, Sydney
- 2005 with Susan Windybank, Papua New Guinea's choice; a tale of two nations, Issue Analysis No 58, The Centre for Independent Studies, Sydney.
- 2006 with Gaurav Sodhi, Annals of Aid: Vanuatu and The United States Millennium Challenge Corporation, Issue Analysis No 69, Centre for Independent Studies, Sydney
- 2006 with Gaurav Sodhi, Should Australia and New Zealand open their doors to guest workers from the Pacific? The costs and benefits for the migrants, the Pacific and Australia and New Zealand, Policy Monograph No 72, The Centre for Independent Studies, Sydney
- 2007 Kava and after in the Nhulunbuy (Gulf of Carpentaria) hinterland, Issues Analysis No 88, Centre for Independent Studies, Sydney
- 2008 Indigenous education in the Northern Territory. Policy Monograph, 83, Centre for Independent Studies, Sydney
- 2008 with Gaurav Sodhi, The Bipolar Pacific, Issue Analysis No 98, The Centre for Independent Studies, Sydney
- 2009 with Mark Hughes, Revisiting Indigenous Education, Policy Monograph No 94, Centre for Independent Studies, Sydney
- 2010 with Mark Hughes and Sara Hudson, Private Housing on Indigenous Lands, Policy Monograph No 113, Centre for Independent Studies, Sydney.
- 2010 with Mark Hughes, Indigenous Education 2010, Policy Monograph No 110, Centre for Independent Studies, Sydney.
- 2010 with Mark Hughes, Indigenous Employment, Unemployment and Labour Force Participation: Facts for Evidence Based Policies, Policy Monograph No 107, Centre for Independent Studies, Sydney.
- 2012 with Mark Hughes, Indigenous Education 2012, Policy Monograph No 129, Centre for Independent Studies, Sydney.

=== Journal articles ===
- 1962 'The eight hour day and the development of the labour movement in Victoria in the eighteen-fifties', Historical Studies of Australia and New Zealand 9(36) May:396–412.
- 1962 'Business history or the history of business?', Business Archives and History 3(1):1–19.
- 1963 'Industrial relations in the Australian iron and steel industry, 1876–1962', The Journal of Industrial Relations 4(2):120-36.
- 1964 'Federalism and industrial development in Australia', The Australian Journal of Politics and History, X(3) December:323-40.
- 1964 'The political economy of Nauru', The Economic Record 40(92) December:508-34.
- 1966 'The industrial pattern: mining, manufacturing and tertiary industries', Review of the Vernon Report, The Economic Record 42(97):85–94.
- 1967 'Australians as foreign investors: Australian investment in Singapore and Malaysian manufacturing industries', Australian Economic Papers, June:57–76.
- 1971 'Industrialization, employment and urbanization', Finance and Development 8(1):42-9.
- 1975 'Economic rents, the distribution of gains from mineral exploitation, and mineral development policy', World Development 3(11 & 12):811-25.
- 1977 'The external debt of developing countries', Finance and Development, 14(4):22-5, December.
- 1978 'Industrialization and development: a stocktaking', Industry and Development, 2:1–27.
- 1978 With Shamshir Singh, 'Economic rent: incidence in selected metals and minerals, Resources Policy, June:135-45.
- 1979 'Debt and development: the role of foreign capital in economic growth', World Development 7(2), February:95–112.
- 1980 With Goran Ohlin, 'Adjustment to the changing international structure of production', Finance and Development 12(2), June:21-4.
- 1981 With Jean Waelbroeck, 'Can developing-country exports keep growing in the 1980s?', The World Economy 4(2), June:127-47.
- 1982 'Les tendances a long terme de l'economie mondiale et les perspectives des pays en developpement pour les annees 1980', Revue d'Institut des Sciences Mathematiques et d'Economies Appliquees.
- 1982 'Private enterprise and development – comparative country experience', Finance and Development 19(1), March.
- 1983 'Capital utilization in manufacturing', Finance and Development, 4, March.
- 1983 'Global economic relations', Australian Outlook 37(3) December:132-7.
- 1984 'Industrializing small countries', Industry and Development, 12:89–99.
- 1984 'Prospects for international growth', Australian Economic Papers, 3(2) June:1–16.
- 1985 'Asian and Pacific developing economies performance and issues', Asian Development Review, 3(1):1–23.
- 1986 'The right to work', Australian Bulletin of Labour, 12(4):234–243.
- 1988 'Too little, too late: Australia's future in the Pacific economy', in the December 1988 edition of the Australian Economic Papers, 27(51):187–195
- 1989 'Catching up: the newly industrializing economies in the 1990s', Asian Development Review, Vol 7, No 2.
- 1991 'Does APEC make sense?' ASEAN Economic Bulletin, 8(2):125–136.
- 1994 'Is development in Asia sustainable? A 50 year perspective', Asia Pacific Development Journal, .Vol 1, No.1, June, p1-25
- 1994 with Berhanu Woldekidan, 'The Emergence of the Middle Class in ASEAN Countries', The ASEAN Economic Bulletin, v12 no 2 139-149 Nov 1994
- 1994 with Hisako Toguchi, 'Giving Priority to Full Employment', The Australian Quarterly. Winter, p27-46.
- 1995 'Why have East Asian Countries led Economic Development?', The Economic Record, 70(211).
- 1995 with Hisako Toguchi, 'Is Australia Exporting Enough?', Asian Business Centre and Institute of Applied Economic and Social Research, University of Melbourne, Working Paper Series 2/95.
- 1997 Industrial Policy for Australia, Policy, Summer 1997–1998
- 2000 Growth, poverty and income distribution: some introductory remarks, Journal of the Asia Pacific Economy, 5(1/2):38-44
- 2001 The politics of envy: poverty and income distribution, Policy, Winter, 2001
- 2002 Heinz.W.Arndt: economist and public intellectual, The Economic Record, 78 (243):1–11
- 2002 Is globalisation bad for poor people? Policy. Summer, 2002–2003
- 2002 The politics of envy: an international phenomenon, Policy, Winter, 2002
- 2003 Storm warning: can the Solomons Islands be rescued? Policy, 19(2):1–7
- 2003 Trade or aid? which benefits developing countries more? Stan Kelly Lecture, delivered to the Economics Society of Australia, Victorian Branch, 26 February 2003, Economic Papers, 22 (3):1–19
- "Helping the islands to help themselves". Quadrant. 47 (7–8 [398]): 47–49. July–August 2003.
- 2004 with S. Gosarevski and S. Windybank, Is Papua New Guinea viable? Pacific Economic Bulletin, 19 (1):134–148
- 2004 with S. Gosarevski and S.Windybank, Is Papua New Guinea viable with customary landownership? Pacific Economic Bulletin, 19 (3) 133–136
- 2006 Trade, aid and development, Australian Economic Review,39(1): 63–68
- 2008 Strangers in their own country: a diary of hope, Quadrant, 52 (3) March 2008
- 2008 Who are Indigenous Australians, Quadrant,
