= WETG =

WETG could refer to:

- The unused call sign of WTIC-TV channel 61 in Hartford, Connecticut, US
- The former call sign of WFXP channel 66 in Erie, Pennsylvania, US from 1986 to 1995
