= WJET-TV =

Television station in Erie, Pennsylvania

- Erie, Pennsylvania; United States
- Channels: Digital: 28 (UHF); Virtual: 24
- Branding: JET 24; JET Action News

Programming
- Affiliations: 24.1: ABC; 24.2: CW+; for others, see § Subchannels

Ownership
- Owner: Nexstar Media Group; (Nexstar Media Inc.)
- Sister stations: WFXP

History
- First air date: April 2, 1966
- Former channel numbers: Analog: 24 (UHF, 1966–2009); Digital: 58 (UHF, 2000–2009), 24 (UHF, 2009–2019)
- Call sign meaning: founding owner Jet Broadcasting

Technical information
- Licensing authority: FCC
- Facility ID: 65749
- ERP: 650 kW
- HAAT: 304.9 m (1,000 ft)
- Transmitter coordinates: 42°2′25″N 80°4′8″W

Links
- Public license information: Public file; LMS
- Website: www.yourerie.com

WJET-TV (channel 24) is a television station in Erie, Pennsylvania, United States, affiliated with ABC and The CW Plus. It is owned by Nexstar Media Group, which provides certain services to Fox affiliate WFXP (channel 66) under a local marketing agreement (LMA) with Mission Broadcasting. The two stations share studios on US 19/Peach Street in Summit Township (with an Erie mailing address), where WJET-TV's transmitter is also located. The road into the station's parking lot is named Sesame Street, as WQLN's studios are located to the south of WJET-TV's facility.

WJET's over-the-air signal covers the city of Erie and its suburbs and nearby communities in Chautauqua County, New York and northern Ashtabula County, Ohio. The station has been dropped from Time Warner Cable (now Charter Spectrum) in the eastern portion of the Cleveland TV market, in favor of WEWS-TV from Cleveland.

== History ==
WJET-TV signed on as the third station in Erie during the 6 p.m. hour on April 2, 1966. Owned by Jet Broadcasting along with WJET radio, it aired an analog signal on UHF channel 24 and the first program shown was a 24-hour movie marathon. The station immediately joined ABC. Previously, ABC had been limited to off-hours clearances on NBC station WICU-TV (channel 12) and CBS outlet WSEE-TV (channel 35) until this point. In January 1998, Nexstar acquired WJET-TV. Later that year, it began performing non-programming functions for Mission Broadcasting–owned WFXP as was standard for most Nexstar stations. That station was then consolidated into WJET's facilities.

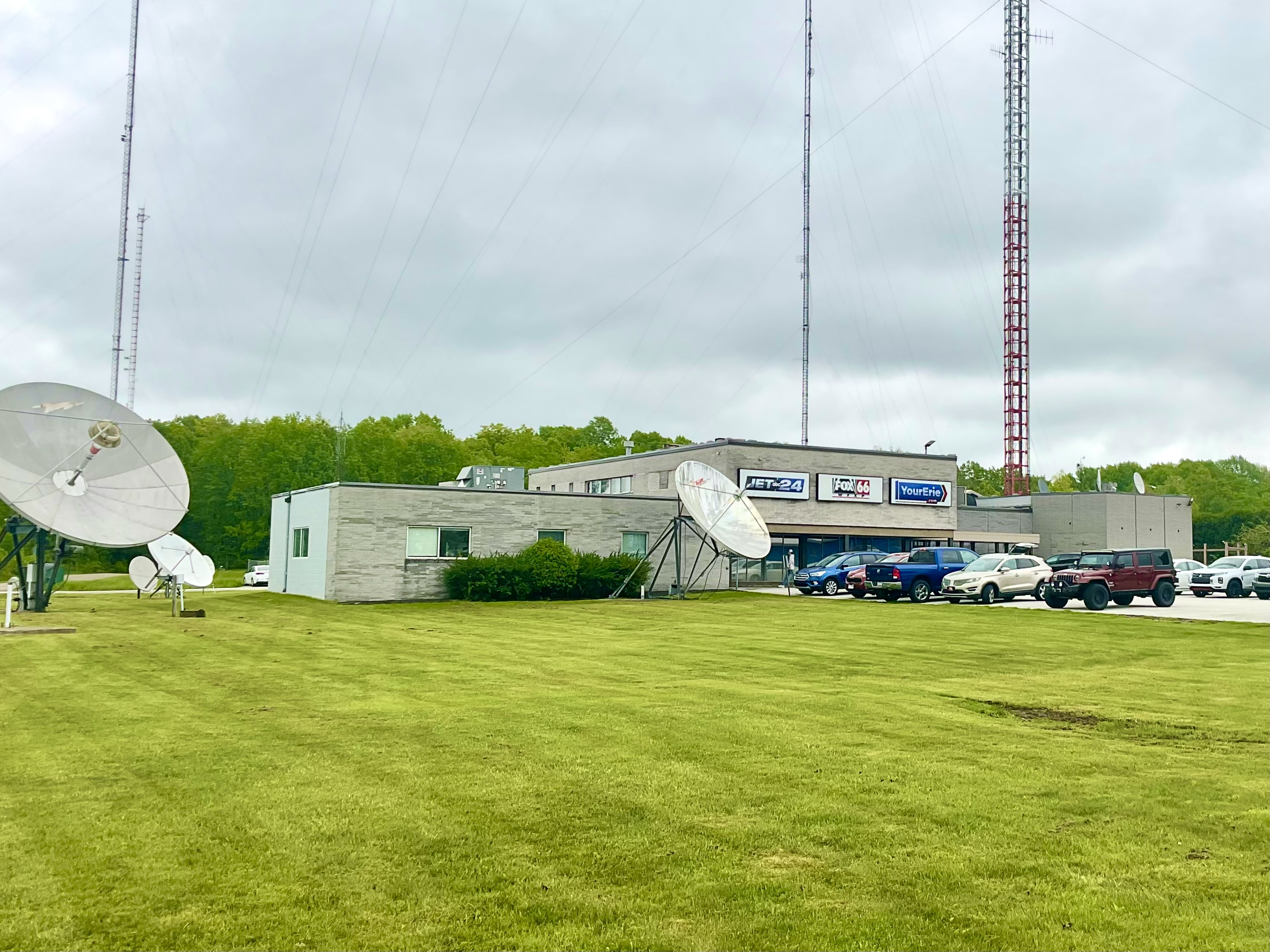
The studios for WJET-TV and WFXP on Erie's south side; the road into the station carries the name Sesame Street, as it is shared with WQLN/WQLN-FM to the south.

WJET-TV began airing its digital signal on UHF channel 58 in high definition in 2008. The station's broadcasts became digital-only, effective June 12, 2009. It is carried on cable in London, St. Thomas and other communities in Ontario, Canada near Lake Erie. In recent years, the station has been bumped to high dial positions on cable systems in those locations. WJET-TV was once available on cable in the Hamilton, Niagara, and Grand River areas but was dropped by the early 2000s.

WJET-TV continues to supply its former radio sister with news and weather updates during the day, even though the two have been under separate ownership for several years.

On June 15, 2016, Nexstar announced that it had entered into an affiliation agreement with Katz Broadcasting for the Escape (now Ion Mystery), Laff, Grit, and Bounce TV networks (the last one of which is owned by Bounce Media LLC, whose COO Jonathan Katz is president/CEO of Katz Broadcasting), bringing the four networks to 81 stations owned and/or operated by Nexstar, including WJET-TV and WFXP.

== News operation ==
Unlike most ABC affiliates in the Eastern Time Zone, WJET-TV did not air a full two-hour weekday morning show until the start of September 2014, when Good Morning Erie began to start at 5 a.m. On Friday nights at 11:20 (11:15 during the high school football season), it airs a local sports highlight show called Friday Night Lights. When the station began operating WFXP, it took over production of that station's nightly half-hour prime time broadcast (known as Fox 66 News at 10). This had previously been produced by WICU through a news share agreement; WICU's 10 p.m. newscast now airs on WSEE-DT2. On September 10, 2007, WJET-TV began airing an hour-long weekday morning show at 8 on WFXP (called Fox 66 News in the Morning). This is the only local newscast in the area broadcasting in the time-slot.

In June 2011, the station rolled out a new logo and on-air graphics, replacing a logo used since the early 1980s and graphics that were used for over 10 years. On October 23, 2013, WJET-TV began broadcasting newscasts in HD.

=== Notable former on-air staff ===
- Kevin Benson – meteorologist
- John Evans – sports director/anchor/reporter (1979–2000)
- Maria Sansone – sports reporter
- John Stehr – anchor/reporter (1979–1980)

== Subchannels ==
The station's signal is multiplexed:

Subchannels of WJET-TV
Channel	Res.	Short name	Programming
24.1	720p	WJET-DT	ABC
24.2	480i	CW+	The CW Plus
24.3	480i	Mystery	Ion Mystery
24.4	480i	Cozi	Cozi TV
