= Thomas Skinner (television executive) =

American television and film executive

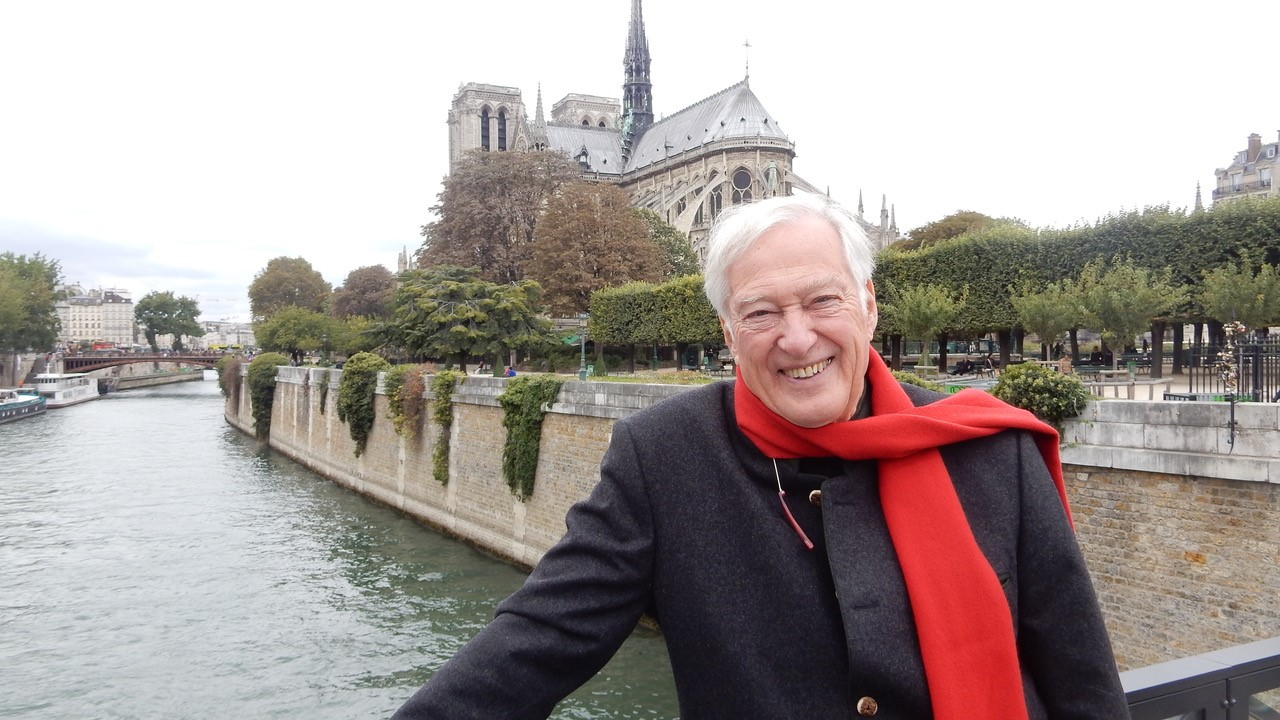
- Tom Skinner
- Education: State University of New York-Fredonia, B.S. and M.A. and PhD from University of Michigan

Thomas Skinner is an American television film executive. Skinner has received four Emmy Awards, three Peabody Awards, and a Dupont/Columbia award. He is known for his work in public television as Executive Producer of National Geographic Specials and other programming for PBS and WQED in Pittsburgh, Pennsylvania, and the Free to Choose Network.

== Education ==
Skinner earned a B.S from the State University of New York-Fredonia in radio, television and speech education and a masters and Ph.D. degree in radio, television, and theater from the University of Michigan.

Following graduation, Skinner joined the San Diego State faculty as an assistant professor, and later associate professor, teaching television production.

== Career ==
In association with psychologist Carl Rogers at the Western Behavioral Institute in La Jolla, Skinner served as a video director for the documentary film Journey into Self. The film was awarded the Oscar for Best Documentary Feature by the Academy of Motion Picture Arts and Sciences after the original winner, Young Americans, was found to be ineligible.

In 1966, Skinner left San Diego State to become Assistant Manager of the public television station, WITF, in Hershey, Pennsylvania. His work included projects such as Sons and Daughters, A Time to Act, and Interact. He also wrote and produced the documentary Fence Around the Amish featuring Ed Begley. In 1970, WITF General Manager Lloyd Kaiser and Skinner became president and Executive Vice President at the nation's first community-licensed public television station, WQED in Pittsburgh, PA. Skinner was also responsible for the establishment of WQED-FM and Pittsburgh Magazine. Skinner also served as Chief Officer at WQED-FM and Pittsburgh Magazine.

Skinner was executive producer of National Geographic Specials, Planet Earth and The Infinite Voyage. Skinner was responsible for bringing the National Geographic Specials to PBS and secured funding for the series from Gulf Oil Corporation. Works produced in conjunction with the National Geographic Society included an educational series on the American Revolution hosted by Henry Fonda, and a series on the works of Shakespeare. In 1975 Skinner was Executive Producer of Voyage of the Hokulea, a 90-minute special that included in the first successful voyage by the Hawaiian double-hulled canoe Hokulea from Hawaii to Tahiti utilizing only celestial navigation. Skinner was also Executive Producer of the 1984 National Geographic Special Among the Wild Chimpanzees about Jane Goodall and Executive Producer for 25 seasons of National Geographic Specials on PBS.

Skinner won Emmys for The Great Whales, Planet Earth, Gorillas, and Rain Forest. Additionally, three works Executive Produced by Skinner received Peabody Awards: The Turned on Crisis in 1971, and the National Geographic Specials in 1980 and 1986. The National Geographic Special The Living Sands of Namib was awarded an Alfred I. duPont-Columbia University Awards in 1979.

In 1994, Skinner left QED Communications to produce commercial television projects, including the seven-hour series Pirate Tales for Turner Broadcasting. Skinner then joined Resolution Productions in Burlington, Vermont as vice president for Programming and Development creating and supervising shows for the Discovery and A&E Networks including Floating Palaces, California and the Dream Seekers and The Story of Money for A&E, and Battleship and The Secret World of Air Freight for the Discovery Channel.

Beginning in 2000, Skinner served as Managing Director at the Inland Seas Education Association, a non-profit organization in Suttons Bay, Michigan, that teaches school children about the science of the Great Lakes aboard tall ships.

In 1995 and 1996, Bob Chitester, then President and CEO of the Free To Choose Network, invited Skinner to serve as a production consultant for a major project produced by Free To Choose Network. Skinner joined Chitester as executive producer of the Milton Friedman television biography, "The Power of Choice" broadcast on PBS in 2007 after which Skinner joined the Free To Choose Network where he is Senior Executive Producer.

== Programs directed or produced ==
Director

- "Journey into Self", 1968

Executive producer

- "The Turned on Crisis" series on drug abuse with Dr. Carl Rogers for PBS, 1971
- "The National Geographic Specials" for PBS 1975–1994
- "Drink Drank Drunk" special with Carol Burnett for PBS, 1975
- "The Puzzle Children" special with Julie Andrews and Bill Bixby for PBS, 1976
- "Raised in Anger" special with Ed Asner for PBS, 1979
- "Previn and the Pittsburgh" (season 3) 4 programs with the Pittsburgh Symphony Orchestra for PBS, 1980
- "The Chemical People" series with Nancy Reagan for PBS, 1983
- "Planet Earth" series for PBS with the National Academy of Sciences, 1985
- "Adult Literacy in America" special with Barbara Bush for PBS, 1987
- "Norman Rockwell, An American Portrait" special for PBS, 1987
- "Visions of the Constitution" series with Andrea Mitchell for PBS, 1987
- "The Infinite Voyage" 20 programs for PBS (with National Academy of Sciences), 1987–1991
- "The House on the Waterfall" special about Frank Lloyd Wright's Fallingwater for the Pennsylvania Public TV Network, 1989
- "Camera Magic: Images of Nature" with Dudley Moore, special for PBS, 1989
- "Nature Rediscovered" produced in "Showscan" for the Seville World's Fair, 1992
- "The Spirit of Pittsburgh" promotional film for the RK Mellon Foundation, 1992
- "Conserving America" series for PBS, 1994
- "Pirate Tales" series for Turner Broadcasting (TBS) 1995
- "Floating Palaces" series for A&E Networks 1996
- "Battleship" special for Discovery Network 1997
- "The Secret World of Air Freight" special for Discovery Network, 1998
- "California and the Dream Seekers" series, A&E Networks 1999
- "The Power of Choice" Milton Friedman Biography for PBS, 2007

Producer/director

- "The Steel Shutter" documentary special with the BBC on the conflict in Northern Ireland with Dr. Carl Rogers and William McGaw, 1972

U.S. program executive

- David Attenborough's "The First Eden" co-production with the BBC shown on PBS, 1987

Senior executive producer

- "The Ultimate Resource" special for public television via APT, 2007
- "The Power of the Poor" special with economist Hernando de Soto for PBS, 2009
- "Turmoil & Triumph: The George Shultz Years" series for PBS, 2010
- "Globalization at the Crossroads" for PBS, 2012
- "Testing Milton Friedman" series with NETA, 2012
- "Economic Freedom in Action: Changing Lives" special for public television with NETA, 2013
- "Unlikely Heroes of the Arab Spring" special for PBS, 2014
- "Walter Williams: Suffer No Fools" for public television with NETA, 2014
- "Power to the People" special for public television with NETA, 2015
- "India Awakes" special for public television with NETA, 2015
- "Trailblazers: The New Zealand Story" special for public television with NETA, 2016
- "The Real Adam Smith" special for public television with NETA, 2016
- "Work and Happiness: The Human Cost of Welfare"special for public television with NETA, 2017
- "School Inc." with Andrew Coulson, series for public television with PBS Plus, 2017
- "Is America in Retreat?" special for public television with NETA, 2017
- "The Price of Peace" special for public television with NETA, 2018
- "Sweden: Lessons for America?" special for public television with NETA, 2018
- "A More or Less Perfect Union" series for public television, 2020
- "We Hold These Truths: The Global Quest for Freedom" special for public television via APT, 2023
- "Free to Speak" series with Nadine Strossen for public television with APT, 2023

Senior executive editor

- "Free or Equal" special for public television with NETA, 2011
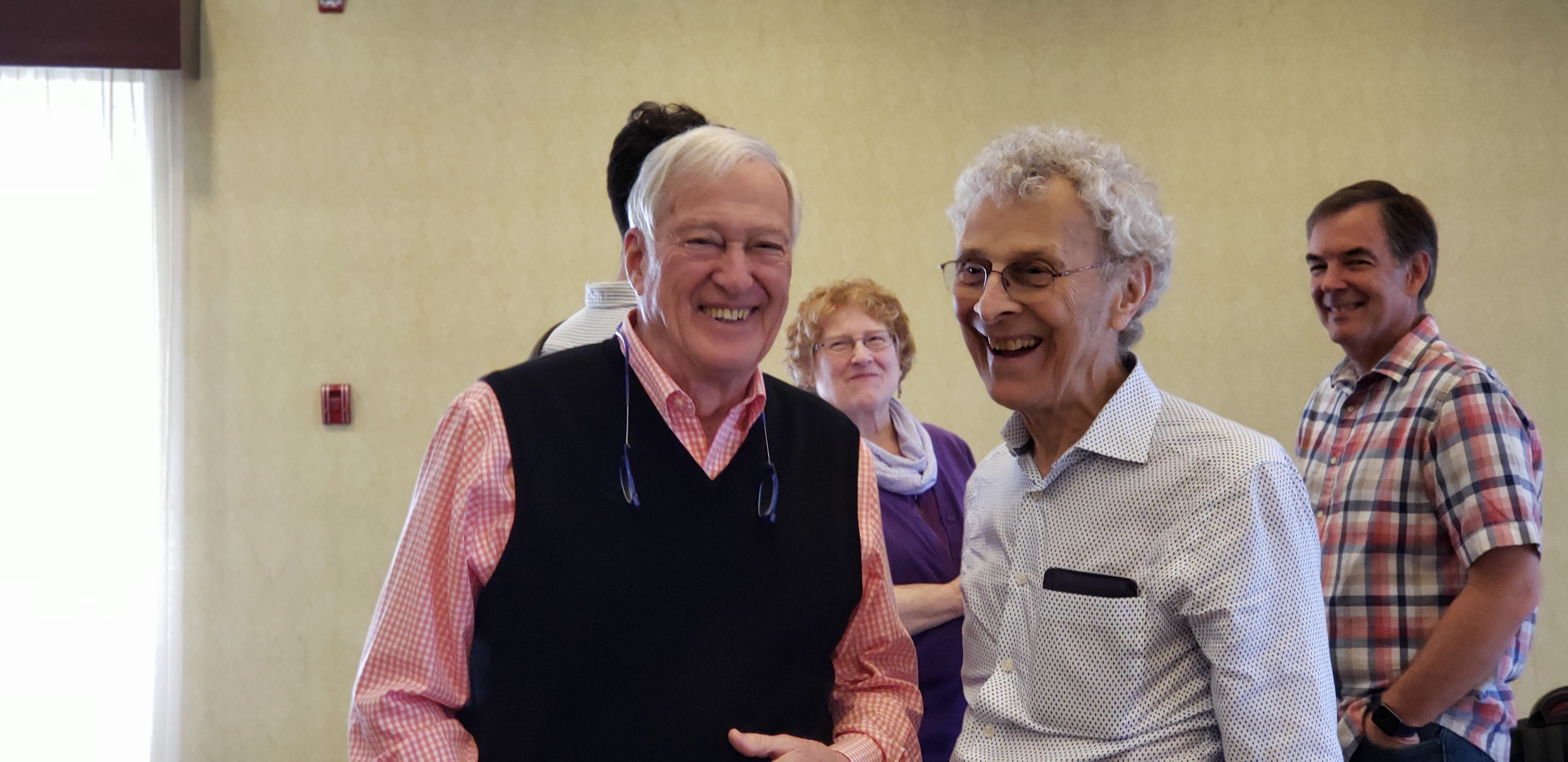
Tom Skinner beside long-time associate and co-producer, Bob Chitester. Pictured c. 2017

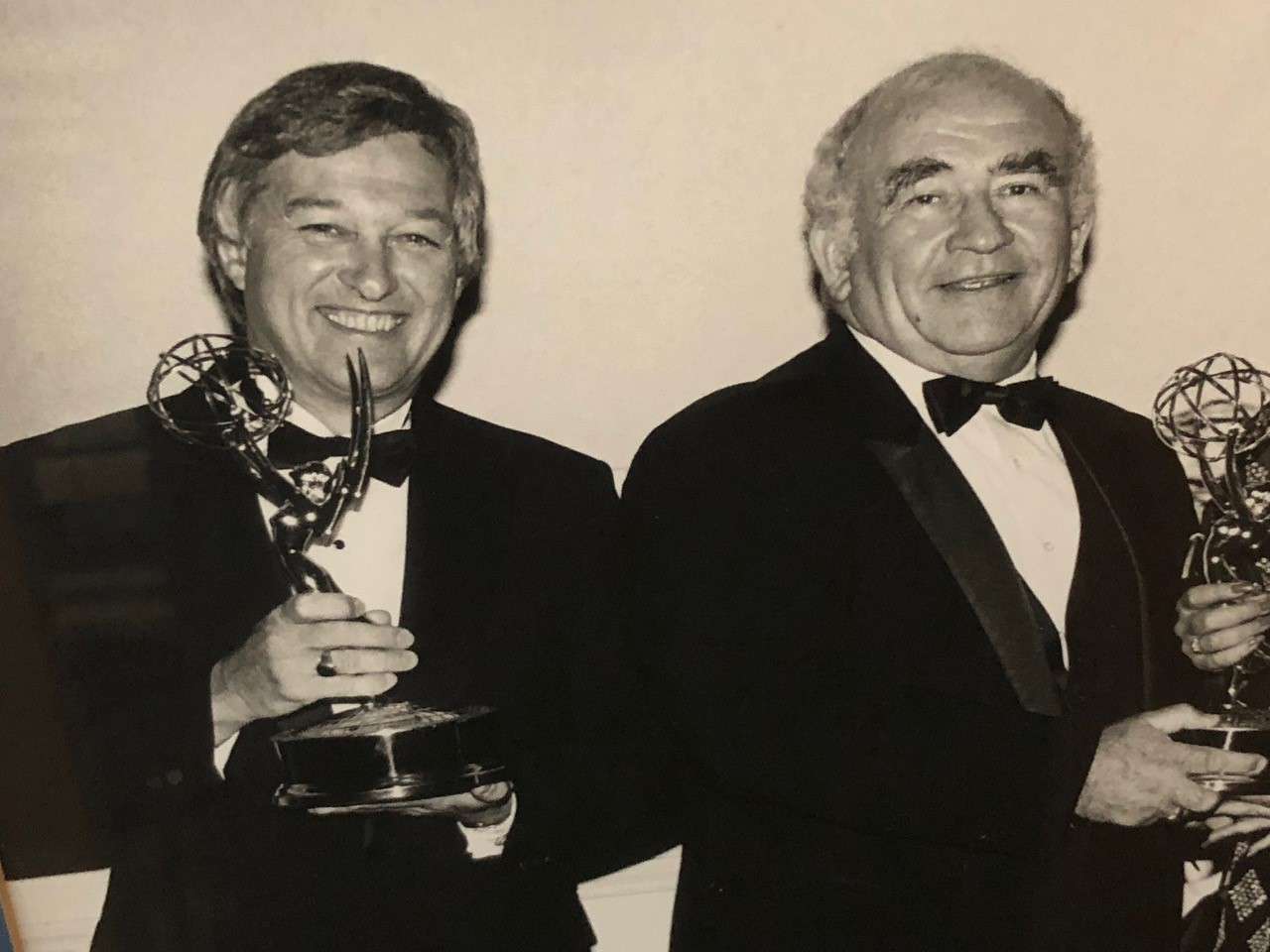
Ed Asner presents the 1990 Emmy for outstanding television documentary series, "Planet Earth" to Tom Skinner.

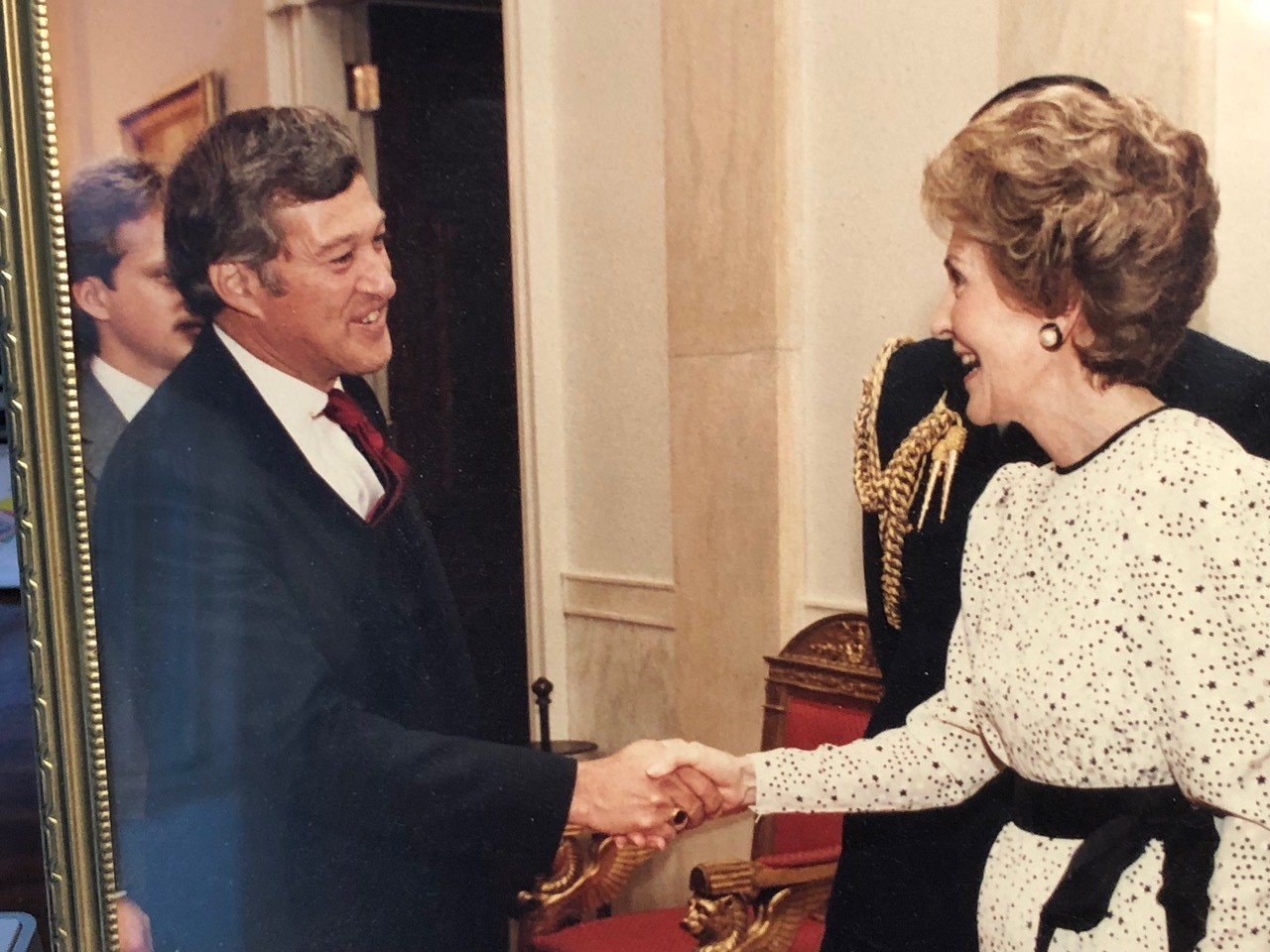
Tom Skinner meeting Nancy Reagan.

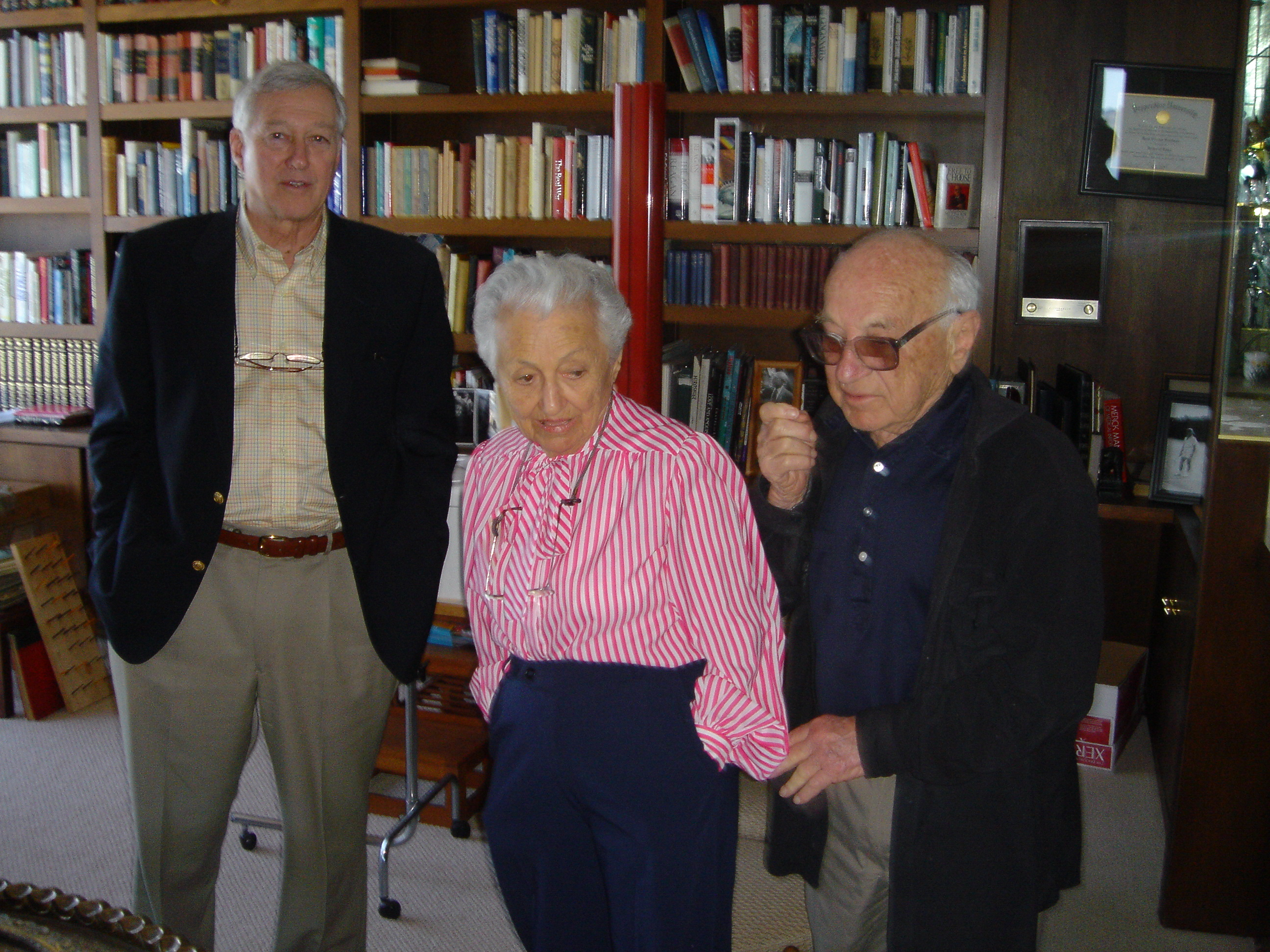
Tom Skinner standing beside Milton and Rose Friedman.

== See also ==
- Bob Chitester
- Milton Friedman
- Rose Friedman
- WQED
