= Stephen Sugarman =

Stephen D. Sugarman
- Occupations: Legal scholar, law professor

Academic background
- Education: Northwestern University (B.S., 1964; J.D., 1967)

Stephen D. Sugarman was the Roger J. Traynor Professor of Law at the UC Berkeley School of Law, where he taught since 1972. He was the associate dean of the UC Berkeley School of Law from 1980 to 1982, and then again from 2004 to 2009. At UC Berkeley, he taught multiple classes in the social justice curriculum, including classes on torts and sports law.

He was a visiting professor at London School of Economics, University College, London, Columbia University, and other institutions. Sugarman died on December 26, 2021, at age 79 after a four-year battle with kidney cancer.

With his colleague John Coons, Sugarman was an influential architect of the school voucher movement in the United States. Their research was cited by The Heritage Foundation to argue for such programs in 1981.

Coons and Sugarman also argued the case Serrano v. Priest before the California Supreme Court in 1976.
