= Adrian Malone =

British documentary filmmaker

- Born: Hugh Adrian Malone; 3 February 1937; Bootle, Liverpool, England
- Died: 13 March 2015 (aged 78); Scarborough, North Yorkshire, England
- Occupation: Documentary filmmaker
- Notable work: The Ascent of Man; The Age of Uncertainty; Cosmos: A Personal Voyage

Hugh Adrian Malone (3 February 1937 – 13 March 2015) was a British documentary filmmaker who produced and directed a number of documentaries, including The Ascent of Man (1973), The Age of Uncertainty (1977), and Cosmos: A Personal Voyage (1980).

== Early life ==
Malone was born in Bootle, near Liverpool, to Philip and Mary Malone. His parents were immigrants from Ireland and ran a fish-and-chip shop in Bootle. Malone quit his Jesuit school and did not go to university. However, he was an avid reader and developed knowledge of history, philosophy, music and art.

== Documentary career ==
In the 1960s, Malone worked for Border Television. In 1968, his documentary about chemical warfare, A Plague on Your Children, "earned him applause from the peace movement, but the undying suspicion of conventional authority". He later began working for the BBC.

Malone wrote a 40-page document for the Annan Committee, recommending the centralized BBC re-organise as a federation. The suggestion, however, "was not welcomed". In 1977, the same year the Annan Committee's report was published, Malone left the BBC and moved to the United States. He was appointed as a lecturer at the University of Pennsylvania in history of science, and supported Walter Annenberg's idea for the 'center of the visual arts', where documentaries could be produced. After that fell through, Malone moved to California where he began working on the production of Cosmos: A Personal Voyage.

In 1980, Malone was the executive producer and director of Cosmos, which starred Carl Sagan. It was the highest-rated program in the history of public television until 1990, airing in more than 60 countries and having hundreds of millions of viewers worldwide. Sagan and Malone often clashed in production, with associate producer Judy Flannery later describing them as "...like oil and water. There was a lot of personal competition." Malone recalled their disputes as "somewhat childish . . . the sort of thing you try not to remember." However, he went on to say: "That tension really made things move along pretty quick and made us think always twice, possibly three times, in order to make sure we were getting ahead of each other."

In January 1986, Malone arrived at the Smithsonian Institution to become executive producer of the documentary program Smithsonian World, then entering its third season. Malone changed the format of the episodes, from a magazine format to looking at single subjects in depth. In total, he oversaw the production of 18 episodes during his time with Smithsonian World. The series won more than 50 awards, including three Emmys and two Primetime Emmys.

While at the Smithsonian, Malone also made a pioneering and seminal contribution to the development of multimedia and new media as we know it today, through his efforts to realize a visionary new education vehicle he had developed, initially known as University of the Air, and ultimately as Smithsonian Project Discovery. The structure of SPD was intended to be a molecular ball-and-stick model, in which the balls were dramas about great thinkers of the 20th century, the sticks were documentary series about the ideas that linked these lives, and multimedia modules were to be the 'glue' that held the model together. As proof of concept for the overall design, Malone identified an existing BBC drama, Life Story, about the race to discover the structure of DNA, and partnered with the Apple Multimedia Lab and Lucasfilm to build interactivity around the film, later joined by Discovery Communications. The resulting videodisc introduced many compelling innovations, some of which still have not yet been duplicated or realized at scale, won numerous awards, was covered in Science and Scientific American, presented at the National Academies of Science, featured in Douglas Adams's documentary Hyperland, and became one of the first, if not the first, commercially viable multimedia offerings, licensed for sale in schools for nearly a decade. In a retrospective seven years later, WIRED magazine identified it as a "landmark product" that "broke new ground with interface design and the merging of son et lumière," and many members of the collaborating teams went on play prominent roles in the development of the medium.

In 1995, Malone produced The Nobel Legacy, a series focusing on different winners of different Nobel Prizes. It was described by the Los Angeles Times as "complex, perplexing, fascinating, occasionally infuriating and eerily beautiful, its subject matter as vast as the universe."

== Personal life ==
In 1961, he met Thomasina "Ina" Henry at a party in Tyneside, and they married. They had three children, David, James, and Adrienne. After his retirement in the 1990s, Malone returned, with his wife, to Tyneside. Following his retirement, he "devoted his leisure to meticulous woodwork, making racks for his wine, and toy villages and doll's houses for his grandchildren".

Following his death, Malone was honoured by the British Academy of Film and Television (BAFTA).

== Awards ==
Year	Awards	Category	Nominated work	Result
1991	Emmy Award	Outstanding Informational Series	Smithsonian World	Nominated
1987	Emmy Award	Outstanding Informational Series	Smithsonian World	Won
1981	Emmy Award	Outstanding Informational Series	Cosmos	Nominated
1980	Peabody Award	N/A	Cosmos	Won
1975	Jacob's Award	Television	The Ascent of Man	Won
