= Robert Lekachman =

American economist (1920–1989)

- Born: Robert Lekachman; May 12, 1920; New York City, U.S.
- Died: January 14, 1989 (aged 68); New York City, U.S.
- Other name: Bob
- Occupation: Economist

Signature
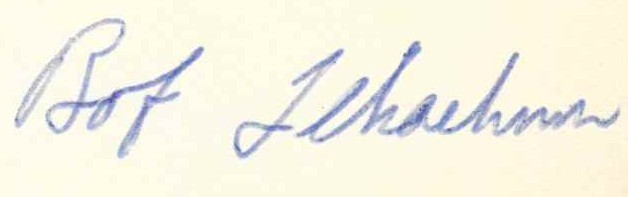

Robert Lekachman (May 12, 1920 – January 14, 1989) was an American progressive economist and academic noted for his interest in social justice. He was noted for his interpretation of John Maynard Keynes's General Theory, a topic of several of his books.

== Early life ==
Lekachman was born on May 12, 1920, in New York City. He grew up a Jew in an anti-Semitic neighborhood in Long Island. He received his A.B. from Columbia College in 1942. While there, he was a member of Phi Beta Kappa and the Philolexian Society.

He served in the United States Army during World War II from March 1942 to December 1945. He was assigned to the 77th Infantry Division at Fort Jackson, South Carolina. He became a clerk in a regimental headquarters and also served in the Pacific War.

When Lekachman returned from World War II, he entered into business but found that he lacked an aptitude for it. He enrolled in graduate school, receiving a Ph.D. from Columbia University.

== Career ==
Lekachman began his academic career teaching accounting, economics, and sociology at Barnard College, Columbia College, and the Columbia Business School. He also taught at Stony Brook University, becoming the head of its department of economics from 1965 to 1968.

Lekachman was noted as a progressive economist. His studies of Karl Marx and John Maynard Keynes lead him to a belief in promoting social justice along with economic growth. In 1973, Lekachman became a Distinguished Professor of Economics at the Lehman College of the City College of New York. He taught there until his health forced his leave of absence in 1988.

Lekachman was often active in politics. During the administration of President Jimmy Carter, he advocated for wage and price controls as a way to slow inflation. He also pushed for policies that would make it harder or, at least, more expensive for corporations to move abroad. Lekachman wrote books that criticized President Ronald Reagan, such as Visions and Nightmares: America after Reagan and Greed Is Not Enough: Reaganomics. In the latter, he wrote: "The President and his co-conspirators have been conducting undeclared war against blacks and Hispanics, welfare clients, women, children and blue-collar workers. Underway is still another episode of class conflict between rich and poor."

His most successful books were A History of Economic Ideas, published in 1959, and The Age of Keynes, first released in 1966. Both books were used as college textbooks and were published in several languages. He also wrote for scholarly journals, including American Economic Review, The Annals of the Academy of Political Science, and The Political Science Review. In addition, he reviewed books for The New York Times and The Washington Post.

In his obituary, The New York Times wrote, "Throughout his career, Dr. Lekachman espoused a philosophy that sought to promote social justice simultaneously with economic growth. He advocated compassion on the part of government toward the underprivileged. His last published work, which appeared last week in The Nation magazine, was a cautionary article of advice to President-elect George Bush."

== Awards and honors ==
In 1986, Change: The Magazine of Higher Learning named Lekachman as one of fifty United States faculty members who had made "major contributions to undergraduate education".

== Personal life ==
Lekachman married Eva Woodbrey. He served on many boards, including the Fund for the Republic and its project on religion.

Lekachman died at his Manhattan home of liver cancer at the age of 68. His papers are housed at the Tamiment Library and Robert F. Wagner Labor Archive in Elmer Holmes Bobst Library of New York City.

== Select publications ==
=== Nonfiction books ===
- National Policy for Economic Welfare at Home and Abroad. Garden City, NY: Doubleday, 1955
- A History of Economic Ideas. New York: Harper, 1959.
- The Churches and the Public. Center for the Study of Democratic Institutions, 1960
- The Varieties of Economics, vol. 2. Cleveland: World Pub Co, 1962.
- Keynes and the Classics. Boston (Oregon State monographs. Studies in Economics). Boston: Heath, 1964
- The Age of Keynes. New York: Vintage Books, 1966, ISBN 9780394416274
- National Income and the Public Welfare. New York: Random House, 1972. ISBN 039431087X
- Public Service Employment: Jobs for All. (Public Affairs Pamphlet no. 481) New York: 1972.
- Inflation: the Permanent Problem of Boom and Bust. New York: Vintage Books, 1973. ISBN 0394489683
- Economists at Bay: Why the Experts Will Never Solve Your Problems. McGraw-Hill, 1977, ISBN 9780070371538
- The Great Tax Debate. Public Affairs Committee, 1980
- Greed Is Not Enough: Reaganomics. Pantheon, 1982, ISBN 9780394510231
- Visions and Nightmares: America after Reagan. New York: Macmillan, 1987, ISBN 9780025702318

=== Children's books ===
- Capitalism for Beginners. Illustrated by Borin Van Loon. Pantheon, 1981, ISBN 9780394738635

=== Journal articles ===
- "The Cult of Novelty." Challenge 8, no. 7 (April 1960): 7–11
- "National Goals from Left to Right:".Challenge vol. 10, no. 2 (1961): 10–13
- "Automation Is Nothing New." Challenge 11, no. 7 (April 1963): 14–16
- "What the Steel Settlement Means." Challenge 14, no. 2 (November/December 1965): 8–11
- "Law and Economics." Journal of Economic Issues 4, no. 2/3 (June 1970): 25–39
- "Academic Wisdom and Union Reality." The American Economic Review 62, no. 1/2 (March 1972): 142–48
- "The Inevitability of Controls." Challenge 17, no. 5 (November/December 1974): 6–8
- "Managing Inflation in a Full Employment Society." The Annals of the American Academy of Political and Social Science 418 (March 1975): 85–93
- "On Economic Equality." Signs 1, no. 1 (Autumn 1975): 93–102
- "How the Rich Can Help the Poor." Challenge 20, no. 4 (September/October 1977): 48–52
- "Proposition 13 and the New Conservatism." Change 10, no. 8 (September 1978): 22–27
- "Up Agen Middle-Class Morality." The Hastings Center Report 13, no. 1 (1983): 13–14
- "SuperStock: A Conservative Alternative to the Welfare State." Journal of Post Keynesian Economics 7, no. 3 (Spring 1985): 440–42
- "America' s Morning After Reagan." with Richard D. Bartel. Challenge 30, no. 1 (March/April 1987): 34–44

=== Editor ===
- Keynes's General Theory: Reports of Three Decades. New York: St. Martin's Press, 1964
- Development and Society: The Dynamics of Economic Change. with David E. Novack, 1964
