= Richard L. Landau =

American endocrinologist and academic

Richard Landau
- Born: Richard L. Landau; June 22, 1916
- Died: November 3, 2015 (aged 99); Hyde Park, Chicago
- Education: Washington University in St. Louis
- Occupation: Physician-scientist
- Employer: University of Chicago
- Known for: Endocrinology research
- Spouse: Claire Schmuckel
- Children: 2
- Family: David Axelrod (son-in-law)

Richard L. Landau (June 22, 1916 – November 3, 2015) was a leader in endocrinology research at the University of Chicago. He published more than 90 papers and served as a member of the editorial board at the Journal of the American Medical Association. Landau was also a long time editor of "Perspectives in Biology and Medicine" journal.

== Biography ==
Landau was born to a Jewish family, the son of Amelia and Milton Landau. His mother was an activist who fought for woman's suffrage, served as the chair of a chapter of the ACLU, and hosted social worker Jane Addams at her home; his father operated a linen-rental company. He graduated with an M.D. from Washington University School of Medicine, and in 1940, he worked under Allan Kenyon at the University of Chicago. During World War II, he served as a doctor in the Pacific Theater.

== Personal life ==
In 1944, he married his secretary Claire Schmuckel; they had four children. One of his sons-in-law is David Axelrod.
