= John Coons =

American legal scholar

John E. Coons (born 23 August 1929) is an American legal scholar, active in the school choice movement, who is a Professor of Law (Emeritus) at UC Berkeley.

In 1999, Coons received an honorary Doctor of Laws from the University of Minnesota, Duluth.

== Books ==
- with Stephen D. Sugarman Education by Choice: The Case for Family Control (1978)
- School Choice and Human Good (Balboa Press, 2022)
- The Case for Parental Choice (University of Notre Dame Press, 2023)
