= Helen O'Bannon =

American economist

Helen Bohen O'Bannon
- Born: 1939; Ridgewood, New Jersey, U.S.
- Died: October 19, 1988; Philadelphia, Pennsylvania, U.S.
- Education: Wellesley College, Stanford University
- Occupations: Economist, civil servant
- Spouse: George O'Bannon
- Children: 4

Helen Bohen O'Bannon (1939 – October 19, 1988) was an American economist who served as the Secretary of Public Welfare for the Commonwealth of Pennsylvania under Governor Dick Thornburgh. A women's rights activist, she became the first woman to be appointed to the Pennsylvania Public Utilities Commission, serving from 1975 to 1979. She was also the first woman to be appointed as a vice president at the University of Pennsylvania.

== Formative years ==
Helen O'Bannon was born in Ridgewood, New Jersey in 1939. She majored in economics at Wellesley College, graduating with honors. She later earned a master's degree at Stanford.

== Academic and public service career ==
O'Bannon was an associate dean at the Carnegie Institute between 1973 and 1976, where she strove to make the university more accessible to women.

In 1976 O'Bannon published an economics text titled Money and Banking: Theory, Policy, and Institutions' (Harper and Row, ISBN 0-06-044877-6).

O'Bannon was Pennsylvania's Secretary of Public Welfare from 1979 until 1983, when she returned to academia, becoming the first woman to hold the position of vice president at the University of Pennsylvania.

== Death ==
O'Bannon died from cancer. at the University of Pennsylvania's hospital in Philadelphia, on October 19, 1988, after a long illness.
