= Robert Lampman =

American economist

Robert J. Lampman
- Born: September 25, 1920; Plover, Wisconsin, U.S.
- Died: March 4, 1997 (aged 76); Madison, Wisconsin, U.S.
- Spouse: JoAnn Lampman

Academic background
- Education: University of Wisconsin–Madison (B.A., 1942; Ph.D., 1950)
- Doctoral advisor: Edwin Witte

Academic work
- Institutions: University of Wisconsin–Madison
- Notable ideas: War on Poverty; Negative income tax

Robert James Lampman (September 25, 1920 – March 4, 1997) was an American economist known for his research on poverty and the measurement of income distribution.

== Academic career ==
Lampman was a professor of economics at the University of Wisconsin–Madison from 1958 until his retirement in 1987. From 1962 to 1963, he was a member of President John F. Kennedy's Council of Economic Advisors, where he began working after being brought to Washington, D.C. by Walter Heller. He is well known for his work on the council, which played a major role in the design of the United States government's War on Poverty in the 1960s, including writing the chapter on poverty in the 1964 Economic Report of the President. This work led James Tobin to say in 1997 that Lampman was "the intellectual architect of the War on Poverty". After returning to the University of Wisconsin, he became also a major force behind the founding of the university's Institute for Research on Poverty in 1966, after which he served as its interim director until June of that year. He also became an early and outspoken advocate for a negative income tax, which eventually led to the introduction of the Earned Income Tax Credit.
