= Institute for Research on Poverty =

American research institute

- Established: March 1966
- Research type: Applied
- Field of research: Economics
- Director: Katherine Magnuson
- Location: Madison, Wisconsin, United States
- Campus: University of Wisconsin–Madison
- Website: www.irp.wisc.edu

The Institute for Research on Poverty is a nonprofit, nonpartisan research institute at the University of Wisconsin–Madison dedicated to studying poverty and economic inequality. It was established in March 1966, as a result of an agreement between UW–Madison and the Office of Economic Opportunity. It is the oldest center for poverty research still active in the United States, and had over 150 faculty affiliates from universities across the United States (as of 2017).

== Founding ==
The key figure behind its founding was Robert Lampman, a professor of economics at UW–Madison, who also served as the Institute's interim director. Lampman did not expect the Institute to last for very long, as he thought poverty in the United States would be eliminated soon after its founding.

== Directors ==
The following people have been director of the Institute:

- Robert Lampman (interim director; March–June 1966)
- Harold Watts (1966–71)
- Robert Haveman (1971–75)
- Irwin Garfinkel (1975–80)
- Eugene Smolensky (1980–83)
- Sheldon Danziger (1983–88)
- Charles Manski (1988–91)
- Robert M. Hauser (1991–94)
- Barbara Wolfe (1994–2000)
- John Karl Scholz (2000–04)
- Maria Cancian (2004–08)
- Timothy Smeeding (2008–14)
- Lawrence Berger (2014–19)
- Katherine Magnuson (2019–present)
