= WQLN-FM =

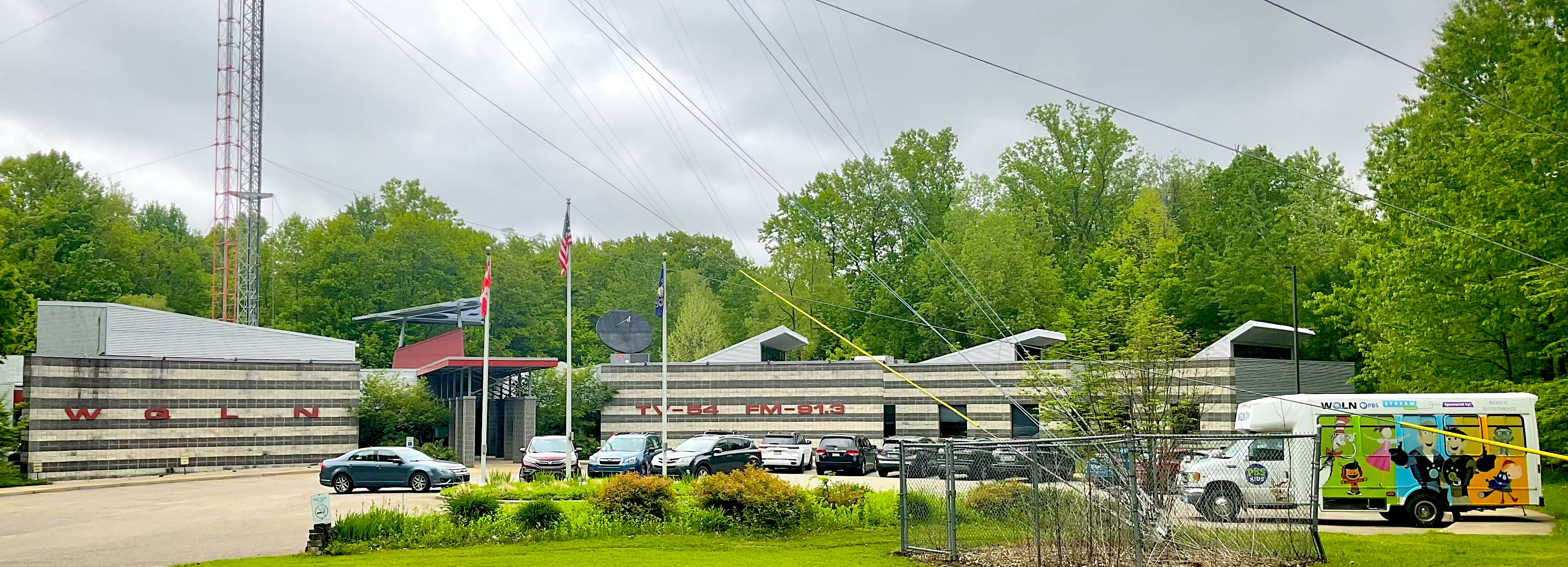
- WQLN's studio facility on Sesame Street in Erie (off Peach Street), a road shared with WJET-TV and WFXP to the south.

Erie, Pennsylvania; United States
- Broadcast area: Northwest Pennsylvania
- Frequency: 91.3 MHz
- Branding: WQLN 91.3 FM

Programming
- Format: Public radio, talk and classical
- Affiliations: NPR; APM; PRX; Beethoven Network

Ownership
- Owner: Public Broadcasting of Northwest Pennsylvania, Inc.
- Sister stations: WQLN

History
- First air date: January 7, 1973
- Call sign meaning: "We Question and Learn"

Technical information
- Licensing authority: FCC
- Facility ID: 53720
- Class: B
- ERP: 35,000 watts
- HAAT: 152 meters (499 ft)
- Transmitter coordinates: 42°2′31.2″N 80°3′56.1″W
- Repeater: (see article)

Links
- Public license information: Public file; LMS
- Website: wqln.org

WQLN-FM (91.3 FM) is a non-commercial radio station licensed to Erie, Pennsylvania, United States. Co-owned with PBS station WQLN, the station carries a mixed public radio format of talk, classical and jazz. The studios and transmitter are in Summit Township, south of the Erie city limits (but with an Erie mailing address), adjacent to WJET-TV and WFXP off Peach Street (U.S. Route 19); WQLN's address is on Sesame Street, named for the popular PBS children's show.

WQLN-FM's signal covers Northwest Pennsylvania and small parts of New York State, Northeast Ohio and the Golden Horseshoe region of Ontario. In addition, WQLN-FM programming is heard on a network of FM translators around the region.

== History ==
WQLN-FM signed on the air in 1973. It is the sister station to Northwest Pennsylvania's PBS member station WQLN. A group of volunteers seeking to establish a non-commercial public television station had been working on securing a construction permit and funding since the 1950s. WQLN-TV 54 finally hit the airwaves on August 13, 1967.

The same organization, Public Broadcasting of Northwest Pennsylvania, decided to pair the TV station with a public radio station as well. A frequency was sought and WQLN-FM made its first official broadcast on January 7, 1973. At first, most of its programming was classical music. But over time, WQLN-FM has added more news shows from NPR and other public networks, as well as jazz and other genres of music.

In 2024, WQLN-FM received a grant of $87,059 from the Corporation for Public Broadcasting to replace aging equipment and upgrade monitoring of its signal to help its translators retransmit programming.

== Programming ==
During weekday mornings and late afternoons, WQLN-FM carries popular news and information programs from NPR and other public networks including Morning Edition, All Things Considered, Fresh Air, Marketplace and On Point. In middays and overnights, WQLN-FM plays classical music, while evenings feature jazz.

== Repeaters ==
WQLN-FM also broadcasts from the following five translators:

Call sign	Frequency	City of license	FID	ERP (W)	FCC info
W207AF	106.1 FM	Meadville, Pennsylvania		4	
W211AE	90.1 FM	Mayville, New York	53718	3	LMS
W218AP	91.5 FM	Titusville, Pennsylvania	53721	13	LMS
W220BA	91.9 FM	Oil City, Pennsylvania	53732	10	LMS
W255AE	98.9 FM	Warren, Pennsylvania	53719	50	LMS

== See also ==
- WQLN (TV)
