= Robert McKenzie (psephologist) =

Canadian sociologist (1917–1981)

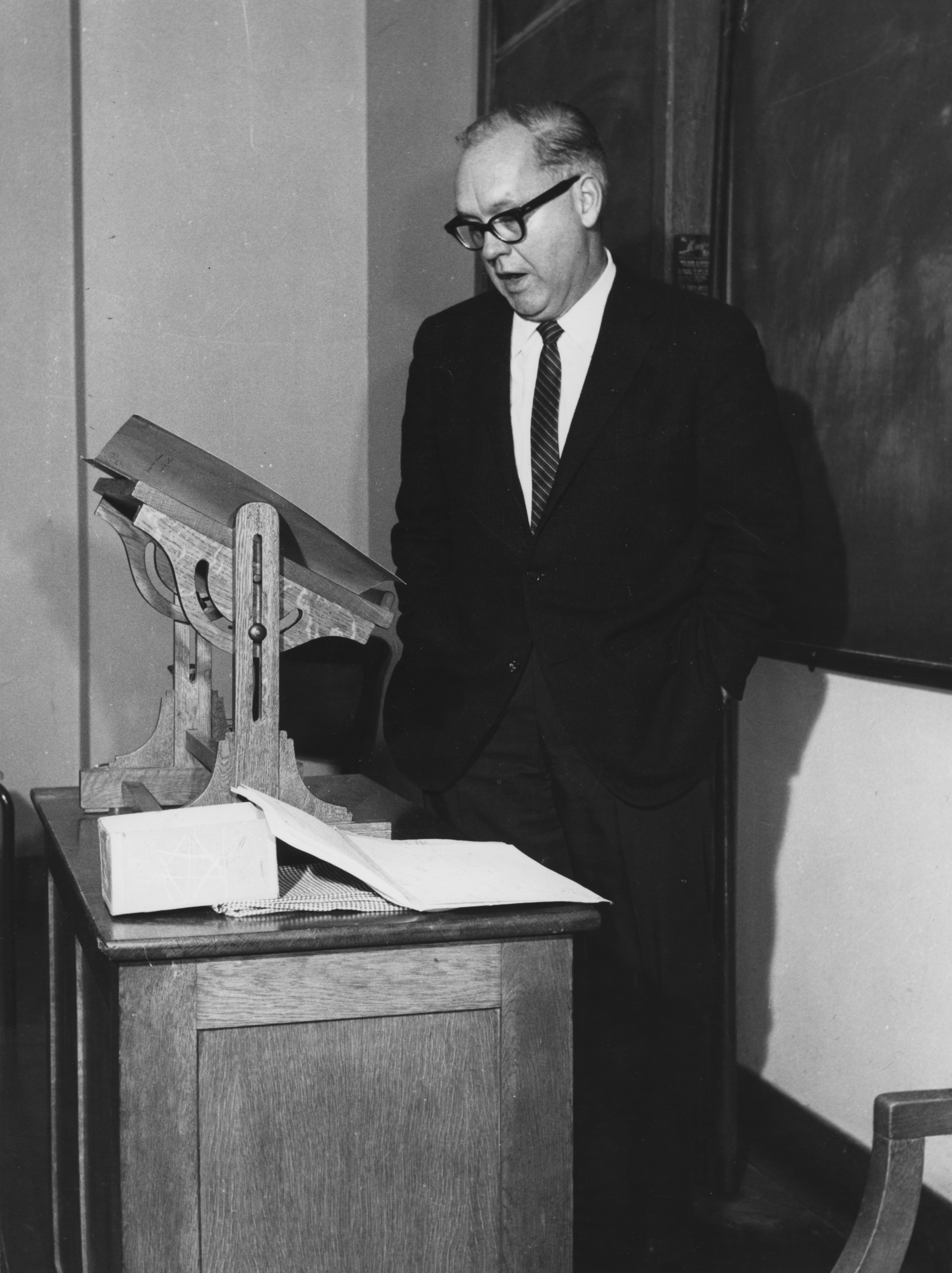
McKenzie lecturing in 1964

Robert Trelford McKenzie (11 September 1917 – 12 October 1981) was a Canadian professor of politics and sociology, and a psephologist (statistical analyst of elections). He was one of the main presenters of the BBC's General Election programmes.

== Early life ==
Born in Vancouver, British Columbia, Canada, the son of William Meldrum McKenzie and Frances (née) Chapman, he was educated at King Edward High School and the University of British Columbia from which he graduated with a BA. He was a lecturer at the same university from 1937 to 1942. In 1943, he joined the Canadian Army and a year later, with the rank of captain, was sent to London where he remained for the rest of his working life. Leaving the services three years later, McKenzie enrolled at the London School of Economics to study for a doctorate. In 1949, he was given a sociology lectureship, and was promoted to professor in 1964.

== Television ==
He was widely known in the UK for his televised reports on British general election results as they were announced on the BBC. He is popularly associated with the swingometer device used in such broadcasts. The swingometer was first introduced in 1955 by Peter Milne, and was later refined by McKenzie and David Butler and used nationally in the 1959 General election for the BBC. At first Butler used the meter, but in 1964 McKenzie enthusiastically took over.

== Other work ==
He wrote many academic books and papers during his career, including British Political Parties: The Distribution of Power within the Conservative and Labour Parties and Angels in Marble: Working Class Conservatives in Urban England, but it was through television and radio that his name became known. His broadcasting career began when he was requested by the BBC to give occasional talks on the Overseas Service; he was later invited to become involved in dramatic radio and TV, such as appearing as himself on an episode of the British series Yes Minister.

== Death ==
McKenzie died from cancer in 1981.

== Publications ==
- British Political Parties : The Distribution of Power Within the Conservative and Labour Parties, 1955; 2nd ed., 1963.
- Angels in Marble: Working Class Conservativism in Urban England (with Allan Silver), 1968.

== See also ==
- Richard Dimbleby
- David Dimbleby
- David Butler
