= WQLN (TV) =

Television station in Erie, Pennsylvania

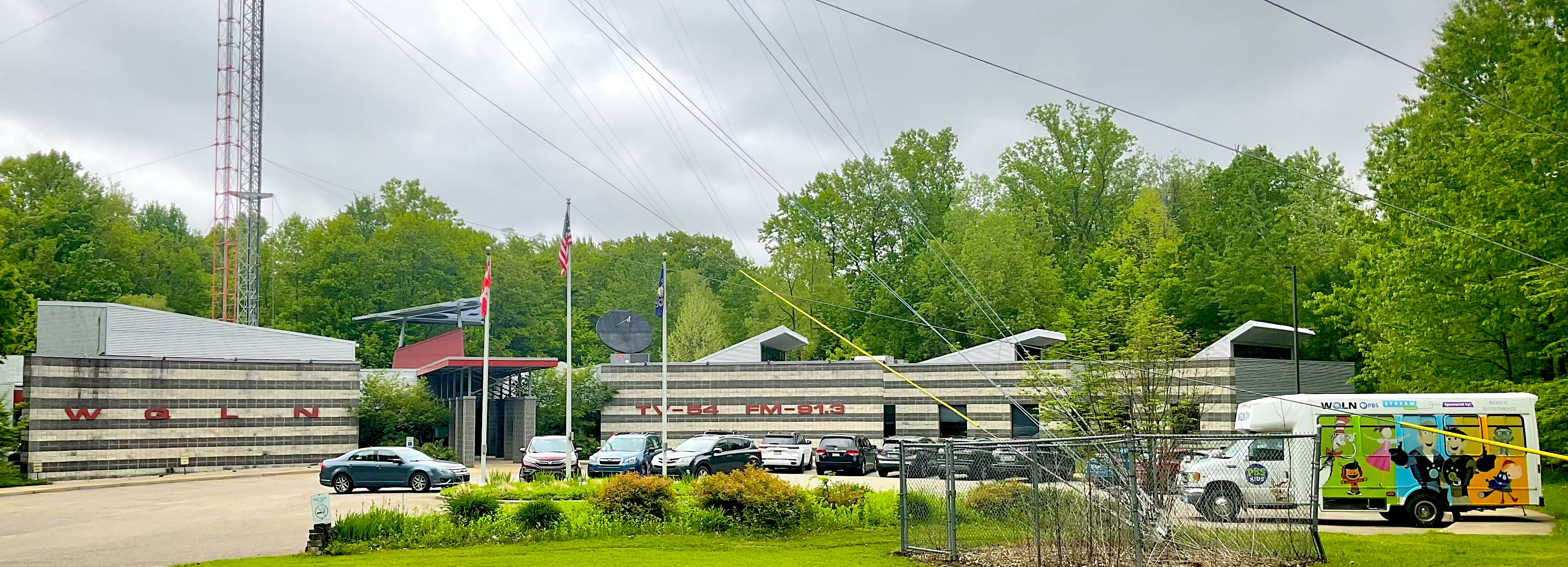
- WQLN's studio facility on Sesame Street in Erie (off Peach Street), a road shared with WJET-TV and WFXP to the south.
- Erie, Pennsylvania; United States
- City: Erie, Pennsylvania
- Channels: Digital: 27 (UHF); Virtual: 54
- Branding: WQLN PBS

Programming
- Affiliations: 54.1: PBS; for others, see § Subchannels

Ownership
- Owner: Public Broadcasting of Northwest Pennsylvania, Inc.
- Sister stations: WQLN-FM

History
- First air date: August 13, 1967
- Former channel numbers: Analog: 54 (UHF, 1967–2008); Digital: 50 (UHF, 2002–2019)
- Former affiliations: NET (1967–1970)
- Call sign meaning: "We Question and Learn"

Technical information
- Licensing authority: FCC
- Facility ID: 53716
- ERP: 191 kW
- HAAT: 277.7 m (911 ft)
- Transmitter coordinates: 42°2′33.3″N 80°3′55.8″W

Links
- Public license information: Public file; LMS
- Website: www.wqln.org

WQLN (channel 54) is a PBS member television station in Erie, Pennsylvania, United States. It is owned by Public Broadcasting of Northwest Pennsylvania, Inc. alongside NPR member WQLN-FM (91.3). The two stations share studios and transmitter facilities in Summit Township on Peach Street, south of the Erie city limits; the road to the studios is named Sesame Street.

In addition to its local viewership in Northwestern Pennsylvania and portions of nearby Ohio and New York State, WQLN is also seen in the London, Ontario, area on Rogers Cable channel 8, and on other cable systems in Southwestern Ontario, Canada.

== History ==
Logo of WQLN from 1978 to 2014

Groundwork for an educational television station in northwest Pennsylvania was laid in 1953 with the founding of Educational Television of Erie. Its initial effort to sign on a station was unsuccessful, but the group eventually reserved channel 54 for noncommercial use. The group, which was renamed Educational Television of Northwest Pennsylvania in 1964, pressed on until finally winning a construction permit on December 6, 1966. The group initially chose the call sign WLRN (for "Learn"), but those letters were already being used by a public radio station in Miami, Florida. They the group went with their next choice, WQLN ("We Question and Learn"). On August 13, 1967, WQLN finally signed on the air. Six years later, in 1973, 91.3 WQLN-FM hit the airwaves as an NPR member station.

WQLN is the second-smallest PBS member in Pennsylvania. Its coverage area is limited due to Erie being sandwiched between Pittsburgh to the south, Youngstown to the west and Buffalo to the north, along with Cleveland's WVIZ also being accessible in parts of the market. As a result, the station has struggled financially for most of its history. Like most PBS member stations along the Canada–United States border, particularly in smaller markets, it also depends heavily on viewership and donations from Canadian audiences. In WQLN's case, that extended audience is across Lake Erie in the London, Ontario, area. At various times in the station's history, PBS mainstays such as Mister Rogers' Neighborhood, Nova, and The MacNeil/Lehrer NewsHour were not seen on WQLN.

The station's transmitter was knocked off-air early September 15, 2008, after its antenna and transmission line were damaged by Hurricane Ike. There was also additional damage (possibly from a prior lightning strike) to the 680-foot (210 m) transmission line. The station later returned using a temporary digital antenna, making WQLN the first Erie station to become fully digital. With the impending end of analog broadcasting only four months away, the station opted against rebuilding its analog facility and is broadcasting exclusively in digital.

== Subchannels ==
The station's signal is multiplexed:

Subchannels of WQLN
Channel	Res.	Short name	Programming
54.1	1080i	WQLN-DT	PBS
54.2	480i	CREATE	Create
54.3	480i	WORLD	World
54.4	1080i	KIDS	PBS Kids

== Coverage in Canada ==
Rogers Cable carries WQLN as the PBS station on some of its systems in Southwestern Ontario, including London, which has almost three times the population of WQLN's American coverage area. As a result of its cable carriage, a major portion of WQLN's financial contributions have come from viewers in Canada. For decades, the station has identified as "Erie–London" to acknowledge its Canadian viewership.

However, in July 2009, Rogers announced that it would be replacing both WQLN and Watertown, New York's WPBS-DT (carried in Ottawa) on its cable systems with Detroit's WTVS due to concerns over signal quality, as a result of the stations not having fiber optic signals available to Rogers. The plan by Rogers was faced with criticism from WQLN's general manager Dwight Miller, who stated that WQLN would not be able to stay on the air without the support of its Canadian viewers. Miller claimed that in recent years, the bulk of WQLN's fundraising revenue came from Canada. The threat of losing its Canadian cable viewership came as an additional unwelcome blow for WQLN which, like other PBS members in Pennsylvania, lost all state funding as of 2009. WQLN would face a loss of about $800,000 of state funding.

On July 30, 2009, Rogers announced that WQLN would be retained on its Southwestern Ontario systems, as a result of WQLN providing a fiber optic connection to Rogers' London headend.
