= The Age of Uncertainty =

1977 book and television series produced by John Kenneth Galbraith

- Created by: John Kenneth Galbraith
- Starring: John Kenneth Galbraith
- Countries of origin: United Kingdom, United States, Canada
- No. of episodes: 13

Production
- Running time: approx. 60 minutes (per episode)

Original release
- Network: BBC, CBC, KCET, OECA
- Release: January 10 – April 2, 1977

The Age of Uncertainty is a 1977 book and television series about economics, co-produced by the BBC, CBC, KCET and OECA, and written and presented by Harvard economist John Kenneth Galbraith.

== Background ==
Galbraith fully acknowledged the successes of the market system in economics but associated it with instability, inefficiency and social inequity. He advocated government policies and interventions to remedy these perceived faults. In his book Economics and the Public Purpose (1973) he proposed the extension of the planning system used in the industrial core of the economy to the wider market economy. He argued for a new socialism, with more steeply progressive taxes, public housing, medical care and transportation, public support of the arts and the conversion of some corporations and military contractors into public corporations.

He was the most read social scientist of his era. Galbraith's association with the U.S. Democratic Party and his criticism of fellow economists, who promoted individualistic free-market economics that he perceived as a false social reality, occasioned strong responses. He was of the opinion that "Wealth is the relentless enemy of understanding".

In the midst of the Watergate scandal in the summer of 1973 Galbraith was called by Adrian Malone of the BBC and asked if he would be interested in doing a television series on the history of economic or social ideas. Galbraith had been thinking of retirement but quickly accepted Malone's proposal. At an early point they settled on the title "Age of Uncertainty" to reflect the sharp contrast between the great certainty in 19th century economic thought with the much less assured views in modern times.

As discussions about the series continued a further theme was developed: that what people believe about the workings of markets and their relationships to the state shapes history through the laws that are enacted or discarded. It was therefore decided that the treatment of these themes would loosely fall into two parts, ideas followed by their consequences.

== Production ==
The content of the series was determined by Galbraith with the presentation style directed by his colleagues in the BBC. Galbraith began by writing a series of essays from which the scripts were derived and from these the book emerged which in many places goes beyond the material covered in the relevant television episode. The series was three years in the making.

== Series outline ==
1. The Prophets and Promise of Classical Capitalism
2. The Manners and Morals of High Capitalism
3. Karl Marx The Massive Dissent
4. The Colonial Idea
5. Lenin and the Great Ungluing
6. The Rise and Fall of Money
7. The Mandarin Revolution
8. The Fatal Competition
9. The Big Corporation
10. Land & the People
11. The Metropolis
12. Democracy, Leadership, Commitment
13. Weekend in Vermont (three one-hour programmes in which Galbraith discusses economics, politics and international relations with guests such as Henry Kissinger, Georgy Arbatov and Edward Heath). These interviews are not covered in the book.

== Reception ==
The leader of the British Conservative Party, Margaret Thatcher, and Keith Joseph objected to the screening of the series by the BBC as they perceived it too biased for a publicly-owned TV station. Milton Friedman was brought over from Chicago to lecture against Galbraith's economic viewpoints with Nicholas Kaldor opposing him. The Daily Telegraph and The Spectator, publications associated with the Conservative Party, dismissed the series, while the Financial Times and The New York Times viewed it positively. Milton Friedman presented his own response to Galbraith in his series Free to Choose.

Along with his other works Economics and the Public Purse and Money, The Age of Uncertainty reinforced Galbraith's stature as a major American economist who upheld and championed traditional Keynesian economics as opposed to the more free market and liberal economic theories of Milton Friedman.

== Editions ==
- The Age of Uncertainty, John Kenneth Galbraith, BBC – Andre Deutsch, 1977, ISBN 0-563-12887-9
