= WFXP =

Television station in Erie, Pennsylvania

- Erie, Pennsylvania; United States
- Channels: Digital: 26 (UHF); Virtual: 66
- Branding: Fox 66

Programming
- Affiliations: 66.1: Fox; for others, see § Subchannels

Ownership
- Owner: Mission Broadcasting, Inc.
- Operator: Nexstar Media Group
- Sister stations: WJET-TV

History
- First air date: September 2, 1986
- Former call signs: WETG (1986–1995)
- Former channel numbers: Analog: 66 (UHF, 1986–2009); Digital: 22 (UHF, 2003–2019)
- Former affiliations: Independent (1986–1990)
- Call sign meaning: Fox Pennsylvania

Technical information
- Licensing authority: FCC
- Facility ID: 19707
- ERP: 930 kW
- HAAT: 286 m (938 ft)
- Transmitter coordinates: 42°2′25″N 80°4′8″W

Links
- Public license information: Public file; LMS
- Website: www.yourerie.com

WFXP (channel 66) is a television station in Erie, Pennsylvania, United States, affiliated with the Fox network. It is owned by Mission Broadcasting and operated by Nexstar Media Group, owner of dual ABC/CW+ affiliate WJET-TV (channel 24). The two stations share studios on US 19/Peach Street in Summit Township (with an Erie mailing address), where WFXP's transmitter is also located.

WFXP began broadcasting in 1986 as WETG, owned by Gannon University, a Catholic university in Erie. It gradually became a more typical commercial independent in its early years of operation and affiliated with Fox in April 1990. The growth of Fox led to new affiliate requirements that saw Gannon sell the station to private owners. Nexstar has managed WFXP since 1998 and airs dedicated morning and late evening newscasts from the WJET-TV newsroom on the station.

== History ==
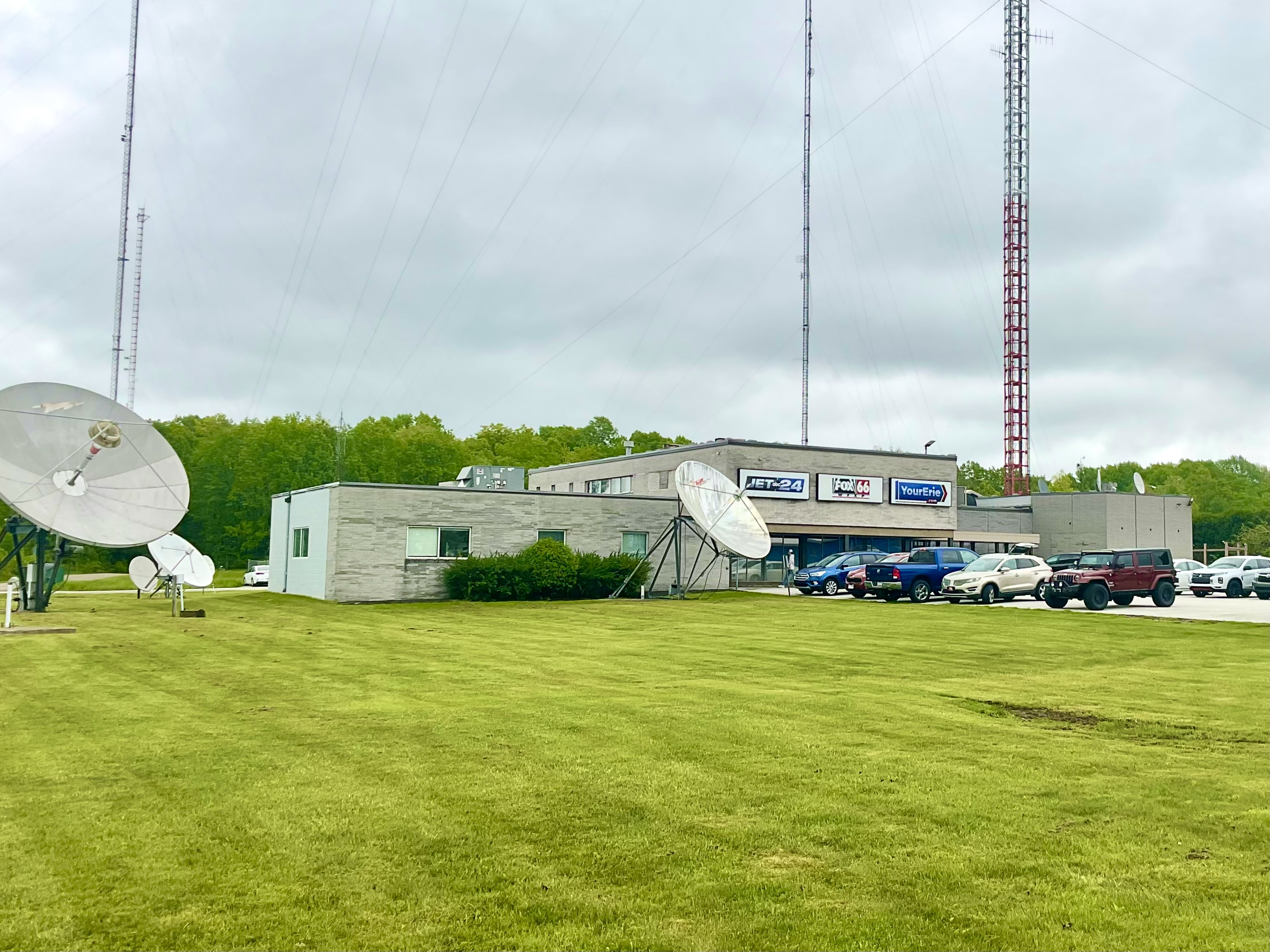
Nexstar's combined studio facility for WFXP and WJET-TV on Erie's south side.

Channel 66 in Erie began broadcasting September 2, 1986, as WETG, operated by a joint venture of Gannon University and the Roman Catholic Diocese of Erie. Gannon had won the permit to build the station from a pool of three applicants in 1984 and promised to broadcast religious and entertainment programs as well as telecourses. Gannon students produced programs for the station, including a televised Mass and daily talk show, and participated in station operations for credit; in 1989, 46 of the 96 students in the university's communication arts program were involved in running WETG. By that time, the station's broadcast day had expanded from eight hours a day at launch to 15 hours, and the programming had grown more typical of an independent.

In April 1990, WETG became Erie's first Fox affiliate. Gannon University continued to own the station until 1994, when the network began increasing its requirements for affiliated stations. As a result, the university sold the station to a consortium of local investors known as Erie Broadcasting. Gannon retained four hours a week of programming, including the Mass, on channel 66. Power was increased from 35,000 to 600,000 watts, and the call sign was changed to WFXP; though the studios were to move off the Gannon campus, this did not take place. Erie Broadcasters then sold the station to Jason Elkin, former founder of New Vision Television; Elkin also tried to buy NBC affiliate WICU-TV but withdrew when the Telecommunications Act of 1996 failed to authorize the creation of duopolies, common direct ownership of two stations in a market. He instead assigned his option to buy to SJL Broadcasting. WICU then filed to run WFXP under a local marketing agreement, a move delayed by an objection by WJET-TV, which had lost out on an attempt to take control of the station.

In 1998, Nexstar—the new owner of WJET-TV—entered into an agreement to maintain responsibility for WFXP's daily operations except programming, with WICU citing the fact that it looked unable to acquire channel 66 outright in the near future; Nexstar had more experience with lease arrangements. Digital broadcasting for WFXP in high definition began in December 2007.

== Newscasts ==
In May 1997, WFXP began broadcasting a 10 p.m. newscast produced for it by WICU-TV. WJET-TV assumed production of this newscast on August 1, 1998.

== Subchannels ==
The station's signal is multiplexed:

Subchannels of WFXP
Channel	Res.	Short name	Programming
66.1	720p	WFXP-DT	Fox
66.2	480i	Grit	Grit
66.3	480i	Bounce	Bounce TV
66.4	480i	Ant TV	Antenna TV (4:3)
