= List of television stations in Pennsylvania =

This is a list of broadcast television stations that are licensed in the U.S. state of Pennsylvania.

== Full-power ==
- Stations are arranged by media market served and channel position.

List of full-power television stations in Pennsylvania
Media market	Station	Channel	Primary affiliation(s)	Notes	Refs
Allentown	WPPT	35	PBS	(Note: Licensed to Philadelphia but primarily serving the Allentown market.)	
Allentown	WLVT-TV	39	PBS		
Allentown	WBPH-TV	60	Independent	(Note: Licensed to Bethlehem, Pennsylvania.)	
Allentown	WFMZ-TV	69	Independent		
Erie	WICU-TV	12	NBC		
Erie	WJET-TV	24	ABC, The CW on 24.2		
Erie	WSEE-TV	35	CBS		
Erie	WQLN	54	PBS		
Erie	WFXP	66	Fox		
Harrisburg–Lancaster–York	WGAL	8	NBC	(Note: Licensed to Lancaster, Pennsylvania.)	
Harrisburg–Lancaster–York	WXBU	15	Univision		
Harrisburg–Lancaster–York	WHP-TV	21	CBS, MyNetworkTV on 21.2, The CW on 21.3		
Harrisburg–Lancaster–York	WHTM-TV	27	ABC		
Harrisburg–Lancaster–York	WITF-TV	33	PBS		
Harrisburg–Lancaster–York	WPMT	43	Fox	(Note: Licensed to York, Pennsylvania.)	
Harrisburg–Lancaster–York	WLYH	49	Religious independent	(Note: Licensed to Red Lion, Pennsylvania.)	
Johnstown–Altoona	WPSU-TV	3	PBS	(Note: Licensed to Clearfield, Pennsylvania.)	
Johnstown–Altoona	WJAC-TV	6	NBC, The CW on 6.4		
Johnstown–Altoona	WWCP-TV	8	Fox, ABC on 8.2		
Johnstown–Altoona	WTAJ-TV	10	CBS	(Note: Licensed to Altoona, Pennsylvania.)	
Johnstown–Altoona	WATM-TV	23	ABC, Fox on 23.2		
Johnstown–Altoona	WKBS-TV	47	Cornerstone Television	(Note: Satellite of WPCB-TV.)	
Philadelphia	KYW-TV	3	CBS		
Philadelphia	WPVI-TV	6	ABC		
Philadelphia	WCAU	10	NBC		
Philadelphia	WPHL-TV	17	The CW, Antenna TV/MyNetworkTV on 17.2		
Philadelphia	WTXF-TV	29	Fox		
Philadelphia	WTVE	51	SonLife, Estrella TV on 51.2	(Note: Licensed to Willow Grove, Pennsylvania.)	
Philadelphia	WPSG	57	Independent		
Pittsburgh	KDKA-TV	2	CBS		
Pittsburgh	WTAE-TV	4	ABC		
Pittsburgh	WPXI	11	NBC		
Pittsburgh	WQED	13	PBS		
Pittsburgh	WINP-TV	16	Ion Television		
Pittsburgh	WPKD-TV	19	Independent	(Note: Licensed to Jeannette, Pennsylvania.)	
Pittsburgh	WPNT	22	The CW/MyNetworkTV		
Pittsburgh	WPCB-TV	40	Cornerstone Television	(Note: Licensed to Greensburg, Pennsylvania.)	
Pittsburgh	WPGH-TV	53	Fox		
Scranton–Wilkes-Barre	WNEP-TV	16	ABC		
Scranton–Wilkes-Barre	WYOU	22	CBS		
Scranton–Wilkes-Barre	WBRE-TV	28	NBC		
Scranton–Wilkes-Barre	WSWB	38	The CW		
Scranton–Wilkes-Barre	WVIA-TV	44	PBS		
Scranton–Wilkes-Barre	WQMY	53	MyNetworkTV, Fox on 53.2, The CW on 53.3	(Note: Licensed to Williamsport, Pennsylvania.)	
Scranton–Wilkes-Barre	WOLF-TV	56	Fox, The CW on 56.2, MyNetworkTV on 56.3	(Note: Licensed to Hazleton, Pennsylvania.)	
Scranton–Wilkes-Barre	WQPX-TV	64	Ion Television		

== Low-power ==
Low-power television stations in Pennsylvania
Media market	Station	Channel	Network	Notes	Refs
Erie	W23FH-D	23	[Blank]		
Erie	W24EU-D	28	[Blank]		
Erie	W32DH-D	32	3ABN		
Harrisburg–Lancaster–York	WLZH-LD	18	Various		
Harrisburg–Lancaster–York	WHLZ-LD	19	Various		
Harrisburg–Lancaster–York	WCZS-LD	35	Cornerstone Television	(Note: Licensed to Chambersburg, Pennsylvania.)	
Johnstown–Altoona	WSPZ-LD	19	Religious	(Note: Licensed to State College, Pennsylvania.)	
Johnstown–Altoona	WTOO-LD	22	[Blank]		
Johnstown–Altoona	WHVL-LD	29	MyNetworkTV		
Johnstown–Altoona	W33EM-D	43	[Blank]	(Note: Licensed to Pittsburgh, Pennsylvania.)	
Johnstown–Altoona	WTOO-CD	50	Heroes & Icons	(Note: Licensed to Bolivar, Pennsylvania.)	
Philadelphia	WEFG-LD	7	Silent		
Philadelphia	WPHA-CD	24	Infomercials		
Philadelphia	WFPA-CD	28	UniMás		
Philadelphia	WZPA-LD	33	Various		
Philadelphia	W36DO-D	36	Various	(Note: Licensed to Darby, Pennsylvania.)	
Philadelphia	WDUM-LD	41	Various		
Philadelphia	WELL-LD	45	Daystar		
Pittsburgh	WBPA-LD	12	Various		
Pittsburgh	WWLM-CD	20	Various	(Note: Licensed to Washington, Pennsylvania.)	
Pittsburgh	WMVH-CD	26	Various	(Note: Licensed to Charleroi, Pennsylvania.)	
Pittsburgh	WIIC-LD	31	Various		
Pittsburgh	WWKH-CD	31	Various	(Note: Licensed to Uniontown, Pennsylvania.)	
Pittsburgh	WBYD-CD	39	Various		
Pittsburgh	WWAT-CD	45	Various		
Pittsburgh	WJMB-CD	60	Various	(Note: Licensed to Butler, Pennsylvania.)	
Pittsburgh	WKHU-CD	60	Various	(Note: Licensed to Kittanning, Pennsylvania.)	
Pittsburgh	WOSC-CD	61	Various		
Pittsburgh	WPDN-LD	65	Daystar		
Pittsburgh	WPTG-CD	69	Various		
Scranton–Wilkes-Barre	W09DJ-D	8	EWTN		
Scranton–Wilkes-Barre	WBZM-LD	17	Silent		
Scranton–Wilkes-Barre	WRLD-LD	30	Religious independent	(Note: Licensed to Kingston, Pennsylvania.)	
Scranton–Wilkes-Barre	WYLN-CD	35	YTA TV		
Scranton–Wilkes-Barre	WSRG-LD	59	Various		

== Translators ==
List of translator television stations in Pennsylvania
Media market	Station	Channel	Translating	Notes	Refs
Erie	WXTM-LD	18	WICU		
Erie	WEPA-LD	19	WICU		
Harrisburg–Lancaster–York	WGAL (DRT)	8	WGAL		
Harrisburg–Lancaster–York	W16EJ-D	27; 33; 49	WHTM-TV; WITF-TV; WLYH		
Harrisburg–Lancaster–York	WLHY-LD	27; 33; 49	WHTM-TV; WITF-TV; WLYH	(Note: Licensed to Lebanon–Harrisburg–York–Lancaster, Pennsylvania.)	
Harrisburg–Lancaster–York	W20EU-D	33; 43	WITF-TV; WPMT		
Harrisburg–Lancaster–York	WRZH-LP	30	WATM-TV		
Johnstown–Altoona	WJAC-TV (DRT)	6	WJAC-TV		
Johnstown–Altoona	WJAC-TV (DRT)	6	WJAC-TV	(Note: Licensed to Bedford, Pennsylvania.)	
Johnstown–Altoona	WJAC-TV (DRT)	6	WJAC-TV	(Note: Licensed to DuBois, Pennsylvania.)	
Johnstown–Altoona	W26EQ-D	6	WJAC-TV		
Philadelphia	W07DC-D	16; 44	WNEP-TV; WVIA-TV	(Note: Licensed to Allentown, Pennsylvania.)	
Philadelphia	WTXF-TV (DRT)	29	WTXF-TV		
Philadelphia	WFMZ-TV (DRT)	69	WFMZ-TV		
Pittsburgh	WTAE-TV (DRT)	4	WTAE-TV		
Pittsburgh	WPXI (DRT)	11	WPXI	(Note: Licensed to New Castle, Pennsylvania.)	
Pittsburgh	WPXI (DRT)	11	WPXI		
Pittsburgh	WPKD-TV (DRT)	19	WPKD-TV		
Pittsburgh	W36FK-D	46	Silent		
Scranton–Wilkes-Barre	W36EY-D	47	WYLN-CD	(Note: Licensed to Berwick, Pennsylvania.)	
Scranton–Wilkes-Barre	W14CO-D	16; 44	WNEP-TV; WVIA-TV	(Note: Licensed to Clarks Summit, Pennsylvania.)	
Scranton–Wilkes-Barre	W29EU-D	16; 44	WNEP-TV; WVIA-TV		
Scranton–Wilkes-Barre	W24DB-D	24	WOLF-TV		
Scranton–Wilkes-Barre	W26CV-D	16; 44	WNEP-TV; WVIA-TV	(Note: Licensed to Mansfield, Pennsylvania.)	
Scranton–Wilkes-Barre	W20CP-D	16; 44	WNEP-TV; WVIA-TV		
Scranton–Wilkes-Barre	W29FQ-D	16; 44	WNEP-TV; WVIA-TV	(Note: Licensed to Pottsville, Pennsylvania.)	
Scranton–Wilkes-Barre	W10CP-D	16; 44	WNEP-TV; WVIA-TV	(Note: Licensed to Towanda, Pennsylvania.)	
Scranton–Wilkes-Barre	W15CO-D	16; 44	WNEP-TV; WVIA-TV		
Scranton–Wilkes-Barre	W20EI-D	16; 44	WNEP-TV; WVIA-TV		
Scranton–Wilkes-Barre	WNEP-TV (DRT)	16; 44	WNEP-TV; WVIA-TV	(Note: Licensed to Waymart, Pennsylvania.)	
Scranton–Wilkes-Barre	WYOU (DRT)	22	WYOU		
Scranton–Wilkes-Barre	WBRE-TV (DRT)	28	WBRE-TV		
Scranton–Wilkes-Barre	WSWB (DRT)	38	WSWB		
Scranton–Wilkes-Barre	WVIA-TV (DRT)	44	WVIA-TV		
Scranton–Wilkes-Barre	WOLF-TV (DRT)	56	WOLF-TV		
Williamsport	W09DB-D	5	WYLN-CD		
Williamsport	W20DA-D	16; 44	WNEP-TV; WVIA-TV		
Williamsport	WVIA-TV (DRT)	44	WVIA-TV		

== Defunct ==
- WBPZ-TV Lock Haven (1958–1959)
- WCHA-TV Chambersburg (1953–1954)
- WCMB-TV Harrisburg (1954–1957)
- WENS Pittsburgh (1953–1957)
- WEEU-TV Reading (1953–1955)
- WFMZ-TV Allentown (1954–1955)
- WGLV Easton (1953–1957)
- WHUM-TV Reading (1953–1956)
- WILK-TV Wilkes-Barre/Scranton (1953–1958, merged with WNEP-TV)
- WKJF-TV Pittsburgh (1953–1954)
- WLEV-TV Bethlehem (1953–1957)
- WNOW-TV York (1953–1958)
- WPCA-TV Philadelphia (1960–1962, 1963)
- WTVU Scranton (1953–1955)
- WUHY-TV Philadelphia (1963–1972)
