= WLVT-TV =

Television station in Allentown, Pennsylvania

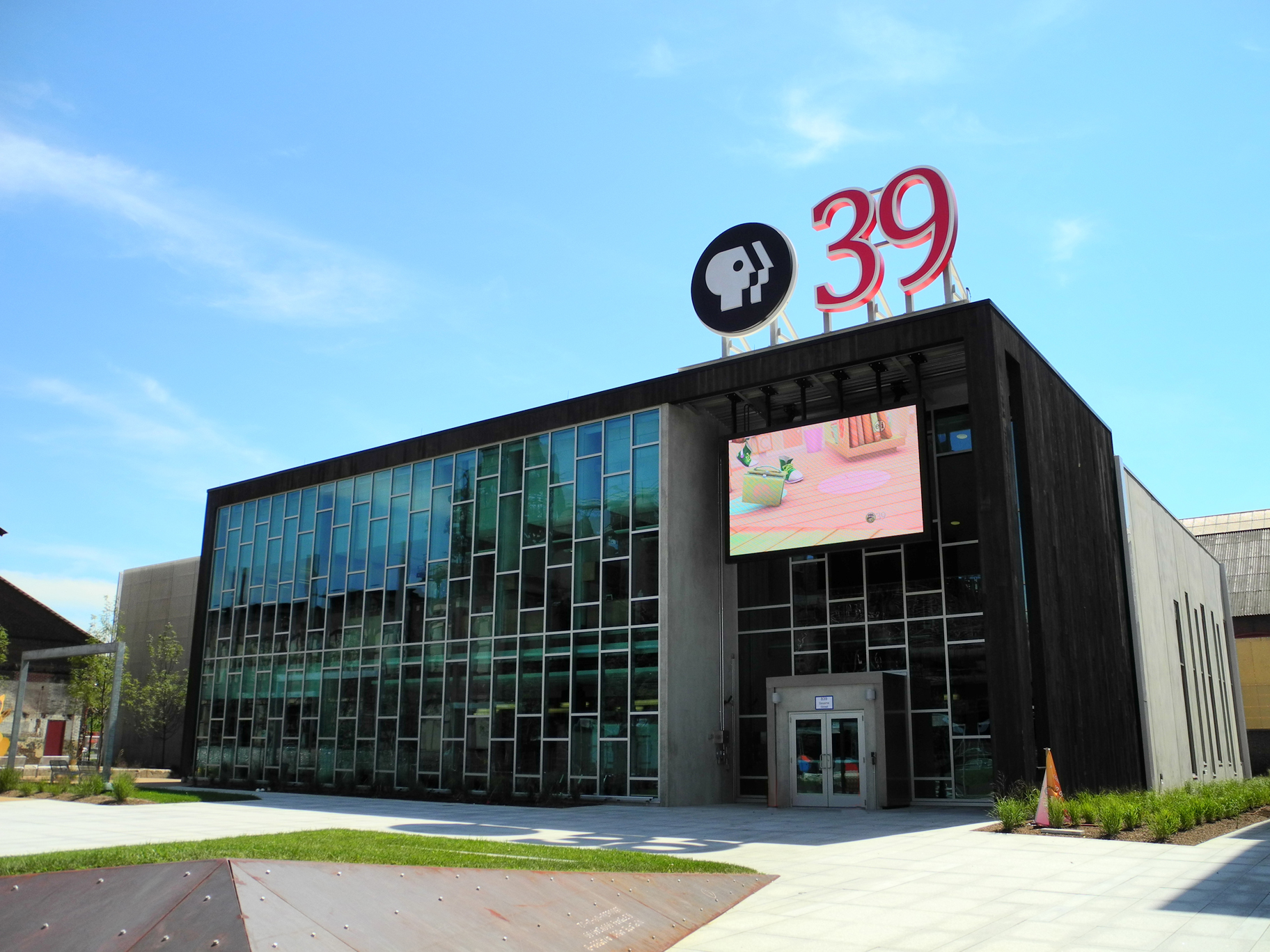
- Studio facility in the SteelStacks development in Bethlehem
- Allentown–Bethlehem–Easton, Pennsylvania; United States
- City: Allentown, Pennsylvania
- Channels: Digital: 9 (VHF), shared with WBPH-TV, WFMZ-TV and WPPT; Virtual: 39
- Branding: PBS39

Programming
- Affiliations: 39.1: PBS; for others, see § Subchannels

Ownership
- Owner: Lehigh Valley Public Media; (Lehigh Valley Public Telecommunications Corp.)
- Sister stations: WPPT; WLVR-FM

History
- First air date: September 7, 1965
- Former channel numbers: Analog: 39 (UHF, 1965–2009); Digital: 62 (UHF, 2000–2009), 39 (UHF, 2009–2018)
- Former affiliations: NET (1965–1970)
- Call sign meaning: Lehigh Valley Television

Technical information
- Licensing authority: FCC
- Facility ID: 36989
- ERP: 80.6 kW
- HAAT: 332.5 m (1,091 ft)
- Transmitter coordinates: 40°33′52″N 75°26′24″W

Links
- Public license information: Public file; LMS
- Website: wlvt.org

WLVT-TV (channel 39), branded as PBS39, is a PBS member television station licensed to Allentown, Pennsylvania, United States. It is owned by the Lehigh Valley Public Telecommunications Corporation, doing business as Lehigh Valley Public Media, alongside WPPT (channel 35) and Lehigh Valley News as well as WLVR-FM (91.3 MHz, owned by Lehigh University and co-managed by Lehigh Valley Public Media). WLVT-TV, WPPT and WLVR-FM share studios at the Univest Public Media Center on the SteelStacks Campus on the south side of Bethlehem; WLVT-TV is broadcast from a transmitter located south of nearby Allentown atop South Mountain.

Channel 39 had been allocated to Allentown for a commercial station in 1952, but no station eventuated, and the Federal Communications Commission canceled a long-dormant permit in 1960. This opened the channel at a time when educational television interests were planning a statewide network. The Lehigh Valley Educational Television Corporation was formed to operate such a station. WLVT-TV began programming on September 7, 1965, with daytime courses for schools and evening programming from National Educational Television, forerunner to PBS. At the time, it was the only TV station in the Lehigh Valley. In 1975, it debuted the high school quiz bowl competition Scholastic Scrimmage, which remains in production.

WLVT-TV was managed for 28 years by Sheldon Siegel until it was revealed that he had instigated rigging of the station's on-air auctions by asking volunteers to place phony bids on slow-moving items. The revelation triggered a financial and reputation crisis for the station, which was forced to make cuts and overhaul its governance, but the station recovered faster than expected. Under Pat Simon, the station built and moved into the SteelStacks studios it now occupies, but it also faced steep cuts in state support and laid off nearly half its staff. In 2012, WLVT became a secondary PBS station to reduce its membership dues, meaning that WHYY-TV serving Philadelphia has first rights to air PBS programs.

WLVT sold its spectrum in the 2017 incentive auction and used some of the proceeds to expand its television programming and other services. It acquired a second TV station license, WPPT; began operating a radio station, WLVR-FM; and launched Lehigh Valley News. Another major staff cut came in 2026 after federal funding for public broadcasting was rescinded. In addition to national programming, WLVT-TV produces local programming on Lehigh Valley issues and life.

== Prior history of channel 39 in Allentown ==
Ultra high frequency (UHF) channel 39 was allocated to Allentown, Pennsylvania, for commercial use in 1952, when the Federal Communications Commission (FCC) lifted its years-long freeze on new television stations. Several groups applied for channel 39, including Queen City Television Company, Lehigh Valley Television, and Associated Broadcasters, Inc. By June 1953, only Queen City—associated with radio station WKAP—and B. Bryan Musselman and Associates, owners of WSAN-AM-FM in Allentown, were in the running. That month, Musselman withdrew its channel 39 application, leaving Queen City the only applicant. The commission granted channel 39 to Queen City tentatively on July 28 and on a final basis on August 11. The firm bought a studio site in May 1954, by which time it was making preparatory work on transmitter facilities.

By the time Queen City filed to sell all shares to WKAP in February 1956, a UHF station—the original WFMZ-TV (channel 67)—had come and gone in Allentown, folding due to lack of advertiser support. The studio site was auctioned that December. When the FCC mailed letters to dozens of permittees of unused UHF stations in 1960, ordering them to show progress as to station construction or lose the permit, the manager of WKAP said that no station would go on the air unless the problems befalling UHF television, such as competition with major-city VHF stations, could be solved. At the time, less than 10 percent of all television sets in the Lehigh Valley were UHF-equipped. WQCY was one of 26 dead or unbuilt UHF stations deleted by the FCC in November 1960.

== History ==
=== Construction and early years ===
Channel 39 was thus allocated but unused when interest began to coalesce in expanding educational television in Pennsylvania. In 1962, Pennsylvania had three educational TV stations, two of them on the UHF band. That year, a state advisory committee report recommended adding new stations throughout the state, including in the Allentown area. The state requested that channel 39 be made into a noncommercial reserved allocation. On December 10, 1962, representatives from local school districts and universities voted to incorporate the Lehigh Valley Educational Television Corporation to build, finance, and operate a TV station to use the channel. The Bethlehem school board authorized funds to buy equipment for the proposed station. In July 1963, the FCC granted Pennsylvania's petition to reserve channel 39 in Allentown and four others across the state for educational stations.

The Lehigh Valley Educational Television Corporation applied for channel 39 on June 5, 1964. During the application process, the corporation was forced to abandon its initial plan to co-site the transmitter at the request of the Federal Aviation Agency, as the planned tower site was in an airport approach path. It instead placed its studio at South Mountain in Bethlehem and its transmitter on the WFMZ FM radio tower on another site along South Mountain in Summit Lawn in Salisbury Township. The FCC granted the construction permit on March 18, 1965, and ground was broken on the studio on South Mountain in Bethlehem on March 31.

On September 7, 1965, WLVT-TV made its first telecast, an orientation for schools, with regular schools programs starting on September 20. That night, the station broadcast its first evening programs from National Educational Television (NET). It was the first station established in the Lehigh Valley since the failures of the earlier UHF era. At launch, the station offered 6 1/4 hours each weekday of schools programs and 4 1/2 hours of evening programs. In 1969, the Pennsylvania Public Television Network went into service, providing a direct connection to NET and offering state programming to channel 39. NET was supplanted by PBS as the network for public broadcasting in 1970.

In 1967, the station approved converting its transmitter to begin presenting NET programs in color. It acquired color cameras in 1970, enabling local telecasts. In its early years, WLVT-TV produced local football, basketball, and wrestling telecasts; coverage of election returns; and programs on local schools, among others. In 1973, the station debuted the high school quiz show Scholastic Scrimmage. Educational programs from channel 39 were seen by as many as 100,000 students in 20 regional school districts. As of 1973, it was the smallest television station in Pennsylvania by budget, full-time staff, and weekly hours of local programming. In 1975, WLVT debuted the first season of Scholastic Scrimmage, a high school quiz bowl competition featuring teams from 14 area schools; within four years, 25 area schools were participating, and the program has gone on to spawn versions with the same name at other public TV stations in Pennsylvania. Later in 1975, the station started airing an annual auction fundraiser.

In 1980, the corporation renamed itself the Lehigh Valley Public Telecommunications Corporation as it evaluated proposals to start a local public radio station. In the 1970s and 1980s, WLVT-TV was small but regarded as stable. The station was the third most successful in public television at raising funds through its auction. This included its senior management. Sheldon Siegel arrived from Phoenix, Arizona, to serve as WLVT-TV's manager before the station was even on the air. Siegel was credited with sound finances, including the creation of a capital reserve fund. By 1993, WLVT had 36 full-time employees.

=== Auction-rigging scandal and financial crisis ===
On September 10, 1993, four members of WLVT-TV's board presented their resignations, citing "philosophical differences" with Siegel. Days later, the station's former vice president and development and its former director of development went public with charges that, as late as 1992, Siegel coordinated efforts to drive up bidding on items at the annual auction by instructing volunteers to call in phony bids, thereby helping move items with little activity, increasing final auction totals. Siegel admitted to this practice. The event represented 5% of the station's income. The former officials also made available a survey of station employees characterizing Siegel as an autocrat. The news exposed rifts among the Lehigh Valley Public Telecommunications Corporation board over finances and projected financial shortfalls, as well as by-laws that granted most management power to Siegel as station president. It also emerged that Siegel had withheld from the board participation in an unsuccessful lawsuit seeking to block WYBE (channel 35) in Philadelphia, a startup public TV station, from joining the Pennsylvania Public Television Network.

The issue is not whether WLVT-TV deceived its viewers out of $100, $1,000, or $100,000—but that it deceived them at all. That is the conduct which tarnished the integrity of public broadcasting and that is the conduct which cannot be tolerated.

— Auditors for the Corporation for Public Broadcasting

The revelations prompted interventions from the Corporation for Public Broadcasting (CPB) and the Pennsylvania Attorney General's office. The CPB moved to withhold grants for 1994 while it conducted an audit. The audit concluded in June 1994 with a decision to deduct $81,527 from the CPB grant, disallowing matching funds for revenues raised by the 1991 and 1992 auctions. The corporation refused to penalize the station for house bidding in any prior years and decided that changes in management and policy merited a downward adjustment. The attorney general's office found that the station had broken state unfair practices law but refused to fine the entity because it was a non-profit.

Siegel retired in March 1994 after nearly three decades as WLVT's only manager, though he remained a consultant to WLVT for three years. WLVT's community advisory board was expanded and reorganized, in response to CPB criticism. The CPB also criticized the Lehigh Valley Public Telecommunications Corporation board, which added five new members and became more active in station affairs in addition to adopting new financial checks and balances.

During this time, the board confronted soaring deficits at the station, in part fueled by legal fees for lawsuits stemming from the auction scandal as well as the WYBE lawsuit. The station ran deficits of $125,000 in 1991–92, $506,000 in 1992–93, and $1.42 million in 1993–94. It had lost 3,000 of the 17,000 members it had before the auction-rigging scandal. In response, austerity measures were instituted. These were only amplified after James Baum, the second-in-command of Louisiana Public Broadcasting, was named as Siegel's full-time replacement in April 1995. Citing federal funding cuts, Baum laid off eight employees, the first major reduction in force in WLVT-TV's history, to balance channel 39's budget for the first time in five years. Canceled alongside with the layoffs was a newly launched minority-interest program, Harambe. Ultimately, WLVT-TV emerged from the shortfall in half the time that had been projected and set station records for contributions and new members. Litigation resulting from the controversy was settled as late as 1999.

=== Lehigh Valley PBS ===
In 1998, WLVT rebranded as Lehigh Valley PBS, in response to the station having different channel numbers on local cable television systems. Baum also announced that many existing local programs would be combined into a new, magazine-style series. These programs included the previously monthly series Black Exposure, Focus: Lehigh Valley Panorama Latino. The weekly program, titled Lehigh Valley Tempo, debuted in June 1999 as the station's first regular public affairs series. Herb Denenberg, a former Philadelphia consumer reporter, served as a correspondent for Tempo beginning in 2001. On September 13, 2000, WLVT began broadcasting a digital signal on channel 62. The digital signal included a subchannel called the Digital Learning Center, containing K-12 classes and other instructional programs, which was also broadcast on local cable systems. Baum departed in 2002 to run KETC in St. Louis. At WLVT, Baum was replaced by Pat Simon, arriving from WQLN in Erie.

In 2008, Tempo spun off two new programs, Tempo PublicSquare and Tempo InDepth. A year later, when the state of Pennsylvania cut its support for public television by 90 percent during the Great Recession, the main Tempo was temporarily canceled, along with all future documentaries. Declining funding led to the station shedding nearly half of its staff, going from 43 employees to 23 amid a budget impasse. Also in 2009, WLVT-TV became digital-only on January 31. The station's digital signal moved from channel 62 to 39 after the transition.

=== Move to SteelStacks ===
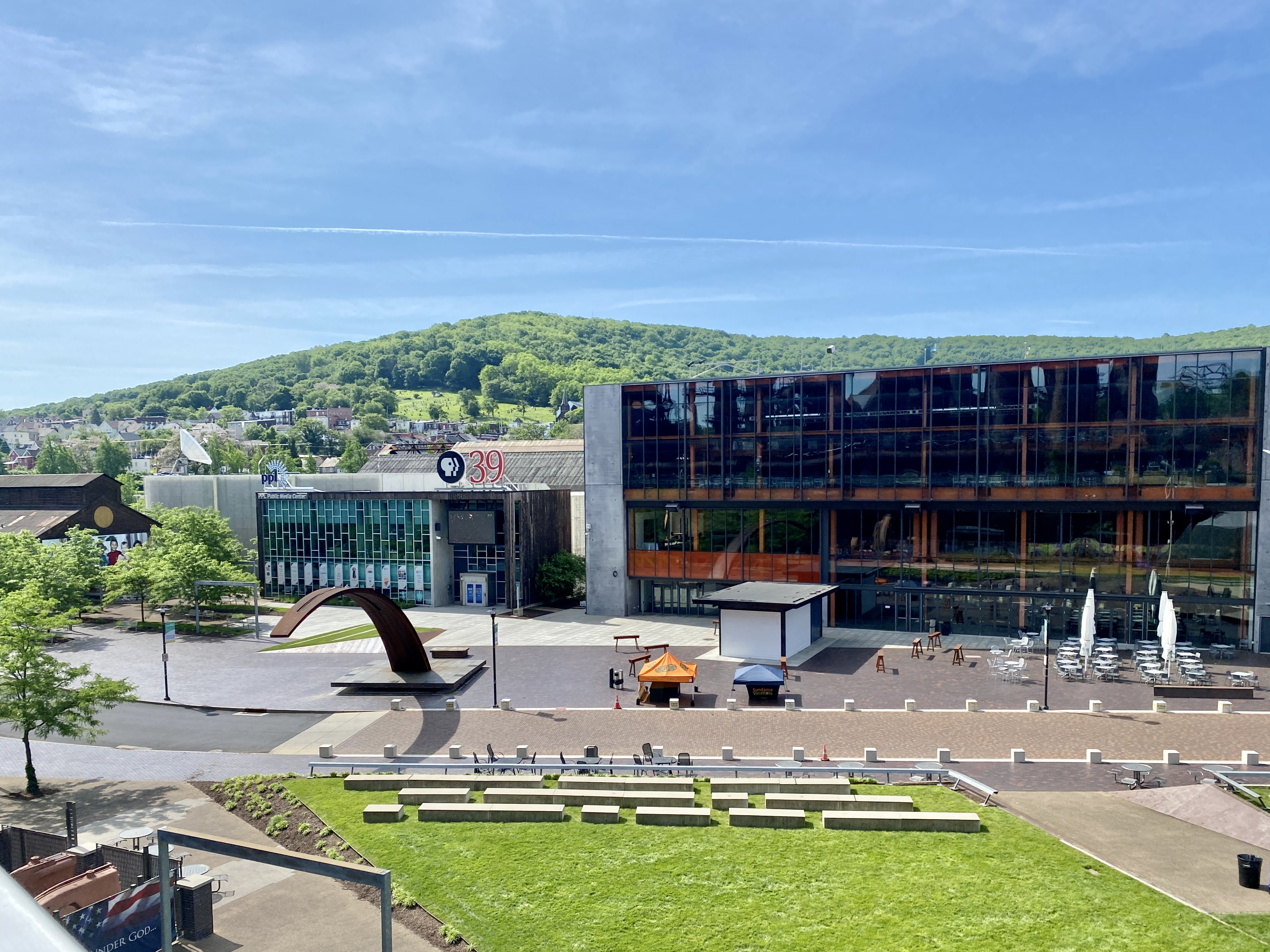
The Public Media Center and adjacent ArtsQuest building

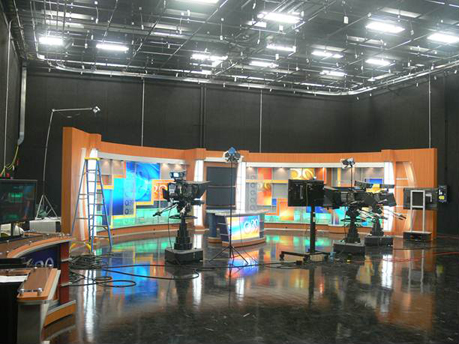
Studio A at the Public Media Center

As early as 2004, WLVT expressed interest in building a new studio facility as part of the Bethlehem Works development on the former Bethlehem Steel mill. The non-profit group ArtsQuest envisioned a component of the site devoted to arts programming known as SteelStacks. The funding cuts did not affect the new studio because the state had already disbursed $6 million in restricted funds for the building. The PBS39 Public Media Center, a 29,228-square-foot (2,715.4 m^{2}) facility with two studios, received city of Bethlehem approval in April 2010. Included in the design were a studio with audience seating for 100 people and a community room for the use of non-profit organizations. The $17 million facility opened in June 2011. Despite its cost, the state funding and state and federal tax credits as well as funds from the Sands Casino Bethlehem on the site covered nearly all expenses. Naming rights for the facility have been sold twice, first to energy company PPL Corporation and in 2022 to Univest Financial Corporation.

With the completion of the new studio, Simon resigned in March 2012. She was replaced by Tim Fallon, a longtime volunteer. To save on dues to PBS, Fallon opted to switch the station to the network's Program Differentiation Plan. He coordinated with WHYY-TV, the primary PBS station in the Philadelphia market, to reduce the typical eight-day exclusivity window for new PBS programs to three days. In 2015, the station debuted the arts series Roey's Paintbox, which went into national distribution. Its producer, the for-profit production house ASR Media Productions, merged with WLVT in 2016.

After years of annual deficits, WLVT sold its spectrum in the 2017 incentive auction to free up money for wireless services. It received $82 million, which was invested in increasing WLVT's journalism presence and local programming output.

As a result of the Rescissions Act of 2025, which defunded the Corporation for Public Broadcasting, Lehigh Valley Public Media's budget took a 24% cut. In response, the station discontinued coverage of the World and Create subchannels and dismissed 16 of its 40 employees. The cuts were part of a shift to make the station more reliant on income from the trust established after the spectrum auction. In particular, the launch of the online news site Lehigh Valley News had resulted in rapid job growth.

== Other services of Lehigh Valley Public Media ==
=== Television: WPPT ===
In December 2017, the Lehigh Valley Public Telecommunications Corporation announced it would acquire the license of WYBE, an independent public TV station in Philadelphia. That station, like WLVT-TV, had opted to sell its spectrum in the incentive auction so that its owner could become a grant-making foundation. The license was used to broadcast the World Channel and MHz Worldview. The station's call sign was changed to WPPT on March 15, 2018.

=== Radio: WLVR-FM ===
A radio counterpart of WLVT-TV had been contemplated as early as 1978. When Pat Simon became leader of WLVT in 2002, she brought with her experience in WQLN's radio operation, and she began talking to WDIY, the Lehigh Valley's public radio station, about possible collaboration. In 2004, WLVT entered into merger negotiations with WDIY, whose founders believed that any merger would lead to WLVT gaining control. The matter divided the WDIY board, and the resignation of two pro-merger members in October 2004 left no majority to approve it. Their replacements were not receptive to the proposed merger. In 2005, WLVT sent merger proposals to WXLV at Lehigh Carbon Community College and WMUH at Muhlenberg College.

In 2019, Lehigh Valley Public Media reached an agreement with Lehigh University to convert WLVR-FM 91.3 to a news and talk station, with its student-run programming moving to an HD Radio subchannel. Citing a student shift toward digital media, Lehigh University announced in 2026 that it would sell the WLVR-FM license outright.

=== Online news: Lehigh Valley News ===
Lehigh Valley News was launched in October 2022 as an online news site. It primarily offers a variety of online newsletters.

== Local programming ==
Local programs produced by WLVT-TV include the high school quiz show Scholastic Scrimmage, the financial information series More than Money, and the weekly health program Living in the Lehigh Valley.

== Subchannels ==
WBPH-TV broadcasts a multiplex containing itself, WPPT, WLVT-TV, and WFMZ-TV from a transmitter on South Mountain in Summit Lawn, Pennsylvania.

Subchannels of WBPH-TV, WPPT, WLVT-TV, and WFMZ-TV
License	Subchannel	Res.	Short name	Programming
WBPH-TV	60.1	720p	WBPH-D1	Lighthouse TV
WBPH-TV	60.2	480i	WBPH-D2	Radiant TV
WPPT	35.1	480i	39EXTRA	PBS
WLVT-TV	39.1	720p	WLVT-DT	PBS
WLVT-TV	39.3	480i	FRAN24	France 24
WFMZ-TV	69.1	720p	WFMZ-HD	Independent
WFMZ-TV	69.2	480i	WFMZ-WC	Local weather
WFMZ-TV	69.3	480i	WFMZ-ME	MeTV (WDPN-TV)

Simulcast of subchannels of another station

== See also ==
- Media in the Lehigh Valley
