= WBPH-TV =

Television station in Bethlehem, Pennsylvania

- Bethlehem–Allentown–Easton–; Philadelphia, Pennsylvania; United States
- City: Bethlehem, Pennsylvania
- Channels: Digital: 9 (VHF), shared with WPPT, WLVT-TV and WFMZ-TV; Virtual: 60
- Branding: WBPH

Programming
- Affiliations: 60.1: Lighthouse TV; 60.2: Radiant TV

Ownership
- Owner: Sonshine Family Television, Inc.
- Sister stations: WLYH

History
- First air date: December 27, 1990
- Former channel numbers: Analog: 60 (UHF, 1990–2009)
- Call sign meaning: Bethlehem and Philadelphia (alternatively, Pat Huber, station founder)

Technical information
- Licensing authority: FCC
- Facility ID: 60850
- ERP: 80.6 kW
- HAAT: 332.5 m (1,091 ft)
- Transmitter coordinates: 40°33′52″N 75°26′24″W
- Translator(s): see § Translators

Links
- Public license information: Public file; LMS
- Website: lighthousetv.org

WBPH-TV (channel 60) is a religious independent television station in Bethlehem, Pennsylvania, United States, serving the Lehigh Valley and the Philadelphia television market. The station is owned by Sonshine Family Television. WBPH-TV's studios are located on North Fenwick Street in Allentown, with a secondary studio on Columbia Avenue in Folcroft, and its transmitter is located on South Mountain in Salisbury Township.

== History ==
The station was an outgrowth of Christian programming that Pat Huber had begun on a local public-access cable television channel. In 1985, Huber formed the Sonshine Family Television Corporation and applied for a television broadcast license with the Federal Communications Commission. The station first signed on the air on December 27, 1990.

== Programming ==
=== Current programming ===
WBPH broadcasts select programs from locally produced special interest programs, televangelism, three hours per week of legally mandated secular educational programming for children, and Lafayette College sports events. Since the station's inception, two of WBPH's original programs have been 60 Live and Bethlehem Glory, both hosted by station owner Pat Huber. The station affiliated with FamilyNet until it converted to a secular classic sitcom format in 2013 and ended all over-the-air affiliate contracts in 2017 after converting to a new Western sports format as The Cowboy Channel, and with The Worship Network until that network shut down in 2015. Unfilled airtime is occupied with "Song and Scripture" from Radiant TV, a service of WLMB.

WBPH is also an affiliate of the Lafayette Sports Network. Broadcasts are produced by RCN channel 4 and include all of Lafayette College's football games (including early rounds of the playoffs) and all men's and women's basketball home games. Very few of the basketball team's away games are televised by the station, though one notable exception are men's games played at Princeton University.

WBPH also carries a Spanish-language newscast produced by WFMZ-TV.

=== Past programming ===
Through the course of its existence, the station has also produced shows in conjunction with area radio stations and churches. One program that had short-lived popularity among area church youth was Live from Studio 60. Produced along with WBYO (88.9 FM), Live from Studio 60 showcased local Christian bands performing to a live audience at the WBPH-TV studio in Allentown. The program reached its peak in 2000 when it played host to Christian band The Waiting, in conjunction with the Fallout concert, a large Christian music festival held annually in the Lehigh Valley as a promotional event for See You at the Pole. The end of the program was brought on by the need to put efforts into the building of their 3-megawatt transmitter facility to reach beyond the Lehigh Valley into Philadelphia.

WBPH also previously carried the Easton–Phillipsburg high school football game on Thanksgiving Day; that game, as of 2015, now airs on WFMZ-TV.

== Technical information ==
=== Subchannels ===
Subchannels of WBPH-TV, WPPT, WLVT-TV, and WFMZ-TV
License	Subchannel	Res.	Short name	Programming
WBPH-TV	60.1	720p	WBPH-D1	Lighthouse TV
WBPH-TV	60.2	480i	WBPH-D2	Radiant TV
WPPT	35.1	480i	39EXTRA	PBS
WLVT-TV	39.1	720p	WLVT-DT	PBS
WLVT-TV	39.3	480i	FRAN24	France 24
WFMZ-TV	69.1	720p	WFMZ-HD	Independent
WFMZ-TV	69.2	480i	WFMZ-WC	Local weather
WFMZ-TV	69.3	480i	WFMZ-ME	MeTV (WDPN-TV)

Simulcast of subchannels of another station

=== Analog-to-digital conversion ===
In 2002, WBPH applied to have its digital channel assignment reallocated from UHF channel 59 to VHF channel 9. The reason for this was that both the station's analog and digital channels were among the high band UHF channels (52–69) that would be removed from broadcasting use upon the formal transition to digital broadcasts. With the FCC's approval of this application, WBPH became the first station in the Lehigh Valley to broadcast on a VHF channel.

WBPH shut down its analog signal, over UHF channel 60, on June 12, 2009, the official date on which full-power television stations in the United States transitioned from analog to digital broadcasts under federal mandate. The station's digital signal continued to broadcasts on its pre-transition VHF channel 9, using virtual channel 60.

=== Translators ===
- WBZM-LD 17 Wilkes-Barre, PA
- WTOO-LD 22 Clearfield, PA
- W24FB-D Brazil, IN
- W34FL-D Harrisburg–Lancaster, PA

== Availability ==
=== Cable ===
WBPH-TV is seen on cable systems in most of the Philadelphia media market except a majority of Chester County, most of South Jersey, and Delaware. The majority of areas in which WBPH-TV is carried are those within reach of the station's over-the-air broadcast signal.

Verizon FiOS began carrying WBPH on April 17, 2020.

=== Satellite ===
WBPH-TV is carried on Dish Network channel 8169. It is also carried on DirecTV channel 60 in the Philadelphia market.

== See also ==
- Media in the Lehigh Valley
