= WPPT (TV) =

Television station in Philadelphia

- Philadelphia, Pennsylvania; United States
- Channels: Digital: 9 (VHF), shared with WBPH-TV, WFMZ-TV and WLVT-TV; Virtual: 35
- Branding: PBS39 Extra

Programming
- Affiliations: 35.1: PBS

Ownership
- Owner: Lehigh Valley Public Media (sale pending to Lighthouse TV (WLPH, Inc.)); (Lehigh Valley Public Telecommunications Corporation)
- Sister stations: WLVT-TV

History
- First air date: June 10, 1990
- Former call signs: WYBE (1990–2018)
- Former channel numbers: Analog: 35 (UHF, 1990–2009); Digital: 34 (UHF, 2003–2009), 35 (UHF, 2009–2018)
- Former affiliations: PBS (1990–1996); Educational independent (1996–2018); MHz Worldview (2018–2020)
- Call sign meaning: Pennsylvania Public Television

Technical information
- Licensing authority: FCC
- Facility ID: 28480
- ERP: 80.6 kW
- HAAT: 332.5 m (1,090.9 ft)
- Transmitter coordinates: 40°33′52″N 75°26′24″W

Links
- Public license information: Public file; LMS
- Website: www.wlvt.org

WPPT (channel 35), branded as PBS39 Extra, is a PBS member television station in Philadelphia, Pennsylvania, United States. It is owned by Lehigh Valley Public Media alongside the Allentown-licensed WLVT-TV (channel 39) and is broadcast along with WLVT-TV and two other stations from a transmitter on South Mountain near Allentown. WLVT-TV and WPPT broadcast from the Univest Public Media Center on the SteelStacks Campus in Bethlehem.

Philadelphia's educational channel 35, previously the original WHYY-TV and later the secondary station WUHY-TV from 1957 to 1976, was unused until WYBE began broadcasting in 1990. Owned by Independence Public Media of Philadelphia and operating from studios in the Roxborough section of the city, WYBE was designed to provide programming of interest to minority and specialist communities, with local shows for such communities as HIV-positive and prisoners; international news; alternatively sourced public television programs; and an annual showcase of independent films. It made limited use of PBS programming, disaffiliating altogether in 1996, and successfully fought efforts by the state's established public television stations to deny it a share of state funding. Howard Blumenthal became WYBE's chief executive in 2005 and, in 2008, relaunched the station as Mind TV, which broadcast five-minute short-form videos submitted by independent producers and community members as well as cut-down versions of some public TV series.

In 2017, the Federal Communications Commission held an incentive auction to free up broadcast spectrum for wireless uses. Independence Public Media accepted a $131.5 million bid to sell its spectrum, and Mind TV shut down. Independence—today a grant-making foundation known as the People's Media Fund—sold the broadcast license, without an accompanying channel, to Lehigh Valley Public Media. The station changed its call sign to WPPT, began broadcasting from the Lehigh Valley, and initially aired MHz Worldview until that service ceased broadcast distribution in 2020. PBS39 Extra broadcasts reruns of local and national PBS shows as well as prime-time theme nights.

== Prior use of channel 35 in Philadelphia ==
Ultra high frequency (UHF) channel 35 in Philadelphia was the city's allocated non-commercial educational channel, and interest in using it dated back to 1951. The Delaware Valley Educational Television Corporation was chartered in May 1953 and filed for channel 35 the next month. After the organization changed its name to the Metropolitan Philadelphia Educational Radio and Television Corporation, the construction permit was granted by the Federal Communications Commission (FCC) in March 1956. After an unexpected financing dispute with the Philadelphia school board, WHYY-TV began broadcasting on September 16, 1957. Educators then sought the VHF channel 12 allocation at Wilmington, Delaware, which had become vacant, to offer more service and won the channel in 1962. The WHYY-TV designation was moved to the new channel 12, with channel 35 becoming WUHY-TV ahead of channel 12's launch that September.

In 1971, the channel 12 transmitter was relocated to the Roxborough tower farm where other Philadelphia stations are located. WUHY-TV remained in service providing alternate programming—including the only on-air preview of Sesame Street before its national debut, a week-long run starting on July 21, 1969—until August 1976, when WHYY surrendered its license.

The channel was occupied beginning in May 1980 by a translator for the Spanish International Network (SIN).

== WYBE: The Independence Public Media era ==
=== Construction and early years ===
Faith That Pleases God, Inc.—doing business as Community Television of Philadelphia—applied to the FCC on May 19, 1983, proposing to build a new non-commercial educational station on channel 35. The organization, based in San Benito, Texas, was headed by Carlos Ortiz, a Puerto Rico–born televangelist. That application prompted a competing bid to be thrown together at short notice by Independence Public Media of Philadelphia Inc., incorporated by three people including Peter Cuozzo, manager of WXPN radio in Philadelphia. Independence proposed, per Cuozzo, "to program for people who are currently underserved [by television] ... Blacks, Hispanics, women, older people, and the unemployed" and to expand public television by providing a "public information utility", with a limited reliance on PBS programming. Another of the incorporators was Elisabeth Perez-Luna, a radio and print journalist. The thought of losing SIN programming on channel 35 led to a petition drive receiving 10,000 signatures urging that SIN not be forced off the air. In February 1990, it moved to channel 42.

Community Television of Philadelphia withdrew its application for channel 35 in December 1983, leaving Independence the sole applicant. It received a construction permit in February 1984 and stated in May 1985 that it would begin broadcasting later that year. But channel 35—designated WYBE by FCC assignment—took years to get going due to the funding and technical challenges inherent in starting a new television station. Indeed, the group had received a permit sooner than expected. Its board grew to include such notable members as Maggie Kuhn and Louis Massiah; it hired a station manager in 1987. By May 1990, the station had offices on Ridge Avenue in Roxborough—furnished largely with federal surplus equipment—and its antenna on the WTXF-TV tower, and it had been financed by board members and several trusts. Among the board members was John Schwartz, who helped start KBDI-TV, the Denver area's secondary public station. On June 10 or 17, 1990, WYBE began broadcasting, initially for four hours each night and increasing to seven that October. Its schedule included some repeats of PBS programs, to the chagrin of WHYY-TV management, but it was dominated by a wide-ranging array of alternatively sourced programs of varying content and production values, from Today's Japan to the locally produced Understanding Bereavement and Arts Beat.

The new station was not provided by any of Philadelphia's cable television systems until February 1, 1991, when Greater Media added it to its system serving Center City and areas of North and South Philadelphia. The addition came as channel 35 made its first national contribution, distributing to PBS stations nationwide a package of four half-hour programs criticizing U.S. involvement in the Gulf War, produced from public-access television programs and independent contributions. In April, the station debuted Through the Lens, an independent film showcase on topics ranging from AIDS to photography; it became an annual event and won critical praise. More programs appeared through 1991 and early 1992, such as Epidemic HIV, People's Health, Community Legal Services Review, and Cellblock Review, aimed at prisons and prisoners. The 1992 revival of must-carry rules helped put WYBE on more cable systems in the region.

WYBE was not warmly welcomed by some of Pennsylvania's public television establishment. It spent years fighting for funding through the Pennsylvania Public Television Network (PPTN), which initially saw the new station as a confrontational outsider to the public television establishment and a duplicative service. In 1990, PPTN chair Sheldon Siegel, the president of WLVT-TV in the Lehigh Valley, told The Morning Call that "Channel 35 has to prove that it will be substantially different from WHYY before the commission can assume the responsibility of taking the commonwealth's money and spreading it around." WYBE sued PPTN's seven members in January 1992, accusing them of hoarding the PPTN funds amid declining state funding for public broadcasting and violating statutes requiring it receive assistance. Conversely, the Pennsylvania attorney general's office had believed that PPTN's membership was capped in 1968. In November 1992, federal judge John R. Padova ruled that, although the stations did not act as a cartel to block WYBE, the statute determining its board composition with members from public TV stations was illegal. Padova cited Siegel's motivation to preserve funding for WLVT as a reason to change the board composition. A settlement was negotiated to pay WYBE and set up a second station fund for WYBE and WQEX in Pittsburgh.

By 1994, WYBE's programming consisted of the various local shows; an hour block of exercise programs; international news from Japan, Germany, and France; and assorted other programming, as well as a Wednesday hour of the 1950s TV series The Loretta Young Show and Public Defender, to draw viewers in. It upgraded its signal facility in 1995, improving reception, and appeared on more cable systems. In 1996, WYBE dropped its membership in PBS and added programs such as a block of Bloomberg Television business news. The show Cookin' Cheap, produced by WBRA-TV in Virginia and one of 21 cooking shows WYBE-TV carried in 1999, was a particular hit in Philadelphia.

Mixing international news, vintage movies, and daring local programming, it's become the darling of immigrants, intellectuals, [Charlie] Chaplin aficionados, Cookin' Cheap fans, and anyone who wants to know what's going on in Armenia.

— Jennifer Weiner, The Philadelphia Inquirer

Sherri Hope Culver joined WYBE from the New Jersey Network in 1997 and immediately set out to begin general-market fundraising and increase the station's broadcast day. The station had contemplated moving into a Center City office building being renovated by the University of the Arts, but Culver turned down the arrangement, wary of losing autonomy to the university. In 1999, WYBE produced a documentary on the artist Lily Yeh, Angel in the Village, and launched a weeknight call-in talk show, Philly Live. The relationship with WHYY-TV became more cordial and complementary than it had been in the past, aided by a Corporation for Public Broadcasting (CPB) grant to encourage them to work together. In 2000, channel 35 left its original facility to move into the former Greater Media cable building further along Ridge Avenue, a space four times the size than the original studio above a paint store.

=== The Mind TV era and incentive auction ===
Culver departed WYBE in February 2005. The move resulted from a rift with the board, on which sat Howard Blumenthal, who had been involved with Qube and MTV among other cable ventures. Blumenthal was hired as CEO and, over the next three years, worked with the board and staff to plan a new course for the station, one less reliant on the station's mix of specialty audiences. The result debuted as Mind TV in April 2008. Mind's programming consisted entirely of five-minute videos, plus station IDs, underwriting spots and promotions. Each video—either independently produced or edited down from events and shows of other public TV stations—was aired online and on the station's online video library. International programming moved to a second digital subchannel. Mind TV placed an emphasis on soliciting input and producers from the community, holding a "boot camp" to teach aspiring producers the skills necessary to craft packages for air. Funding for studio upgrades came from NBC, which needed the station's collaboration for a digital channel for its WCAU. At the time WYBE became Mind TV, there were only three other public television stations receiving CPB funding without being PBS members: WNYE-TV in New York City; KRSC-TV in Claremore, Oklahoma; and KUEN in Utah. By 2017, it offered NHK World, France 24, and RT as subchannels.

In 2017, the FCC held an incentive auction to encourage broadcasters to sell spectrum to make room in the television band for stations being relocated out of frequencies to be used by cellular services. Operating on UHF channel 35, WYBE occupied prime real estate. Independence Public Media sold WYBE's spectrum for $131.5 million, which Blumenthal promised would be used to remake the foundation. Some of its equipment was donated to Philadelphia schools. Independence became a grant-making foundation, using the auction proceeds as an endowment to support regional media organizations in line with its traditional remit. In 2025, the Independence Public Media Foundation changed its name to the People's Media Fund.

== WPPT: Lehigh Valley Public Media era ==
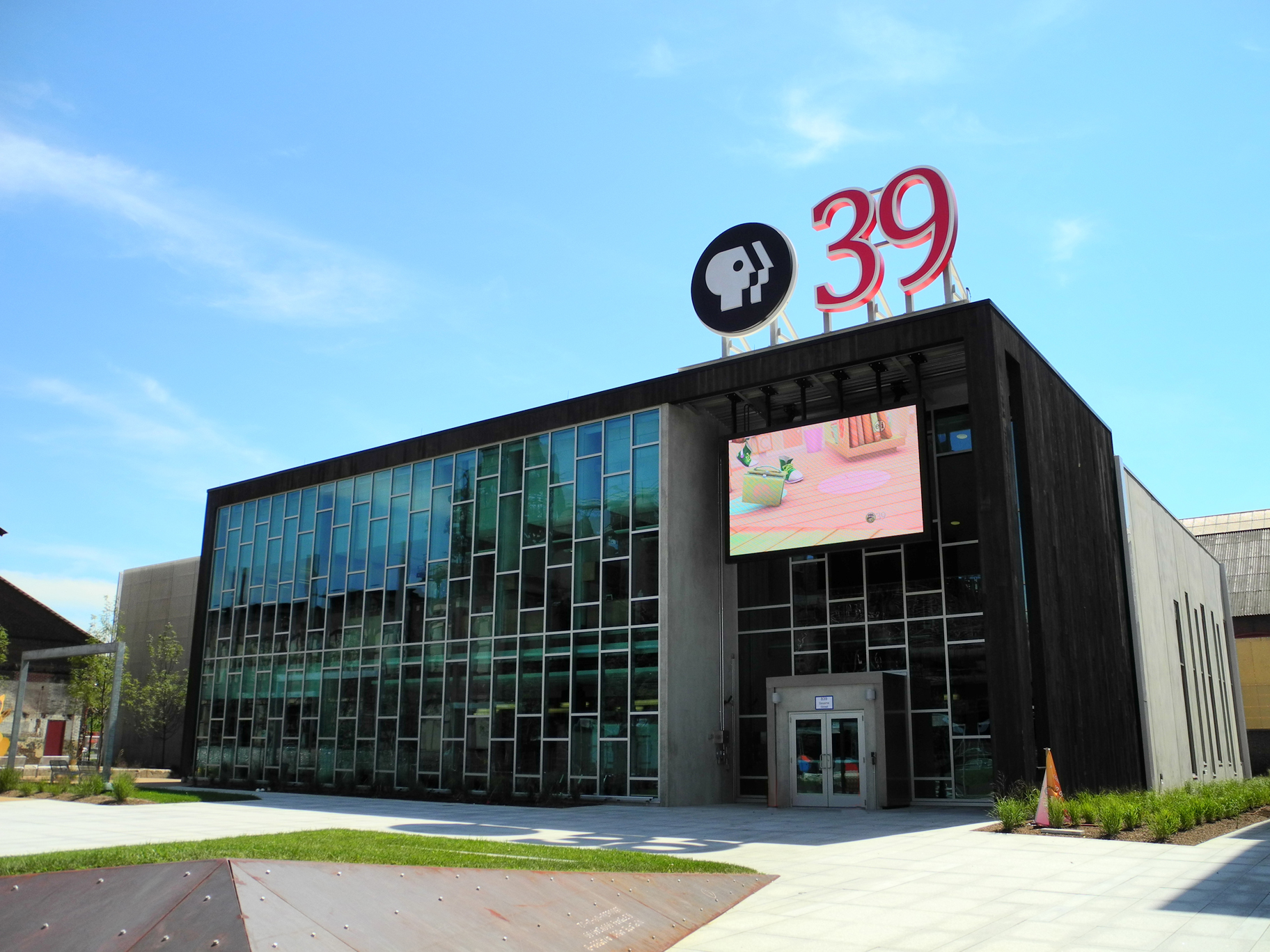
The Public Media Center in Bethlehem, home of WLVT-TV and WPPT

Despite the sale, Independence Public Media retained WYBE's broadcast license—a so-called "zombie" license, since it no longer had a channel of its own to broadcast on. Broadcasters in such situations could negotiate channel-sharing agreements to occupy part of another station's channel. One such broadcaster was WLVT-TV, the PBS station for the Lehigh Valley. In the auction, it sold its spectrum and entered into an agreement with another Lehigh Valley station, WBPH-TV (channel 60). In December 2017, Independence Public Media announced it was donating the WYBE license to WLVT's parent, the Lehigh Valley Public Telecommunications Corporation. Under the arrangement, WYBE began channel sharing on the multiplex, airing MHz Worldview and World Channel. When the transaction closed in March 2018, WYBE changed call signs to WPPT (Pennsylvania Public Television).

MHz Worldview ceased broadcast distribution on March 1, 2020, citing the increased availability in the internet age of live international television, and converted its main offering to a subscription streaming service. The channel became PBS39 Extra, which offers second runs of local and national shows and themed nights in prime time. WLVT discontinued broadcasting World Channel on January 1, 2026, in order to save on programming costs and owing to the Rescissions Act of 2025, which defunded CPB and cut 24% from Lehigh Valley Public Media's budget.

Lehigh Valley Public Media filed to sell WPPT to Lighthouse TV, owners of WBPH-TV, in November 2026. As part of the $1 million transaction, WPPT will move to using capacity allotted to WBPH on the multiplex.

== Technical information ==
WBPH-TV broadcasts a multiplex containing itself, WPPT, WLVT-TV, and WFMZ-TV from a transmitter on South Mountain in Summit Lawn, Pennsylvania.

Subchannels of WBPH-TV, WPPT, WLVT-TV, and WFMZ-TV
License	Subchannel	Res.	Short name	Programming
WBPH-TV	60.1	720p	WBPH-D1	Lighthouse TV
WBPH-TV	60.2	480i	WBPH-D2	Radiant TV
WPPT	35.1	480i	39EXTRA	PBS
WLVT-TV	39.1	720p	WLVT-DT	PBS
WLVT-TV	39.3	480i	FRAN24	France 24
WFMZ-TV	69.1	720p	WFMZ-HD	Independent
WFMZ-TV	69.2	480i	WFMZ-WC	Local weather
WFMZ-TV	69.3	480i	WFMZ-ME	MeTV (WDPN-TV)

Simulcast of subchannels of another station
