= 1957 in American television =

This is a list of American television-related events in 1957.

== Events ==
Date	Event	Ref.
January 6	Elvis Presley makes his final appearance on The Ed Sullivan Show.	
January 14	George Reeves guest stars as Superman in an episode of the CBS sitcom I Love Lucy.	
January 25	Steve Allen makes his final appearance as host of NBC's The Tonight Show. He is replaced by Jack Lescoulie and the show is changed from a talk/variety show format to be more like the series Today, with the title Tonight! America After Dark.	
March 23	The 1957 NCAA University Division Basketball Championship Game, in which the North Carolina Tar Heels defeated the Kansas Jayhawks 54-53, was telecast on five television stations in North Carolina from Kansas City, through the remote facilities of WUNC-TV. Castleman D. Chesley, a local television producer, produced the coverage of this game. This was the inspiration of the establishment of a syndicated package of live men's basketball games of the NCAA's Atlantic Coast Conference, which made its premiere in January 1958.	
March 31	The first TV version of Cinderella, starring 21-year-old Julie Andrews, and with songs by Richard Rodgers and Oscar Hammerstein II, is broadcast in color by CBS.	
April 4	"The Ricardos Dedicate a Statue", the 180th and final first run episode of I Love Lucy, is filmed at Desilu Studios. Its May 6 broadcast on CBS marks the end of an era in early television comedy.	
June	On Tonight! America After Dark, Jack Lescoulie is unsuccessful, so NBC hires Al "Jazzbo" Collins as master of ceremonies. Collins doesn't last long; NBC is already planning to replace him and restore the original format as The Tonight Show, in which Jack Paar becomes the permanent host, starting with the program's July 29 episode.	
September 7	NBC introduces its first animated version of its "living color" peacock logo, starting with the day's episode of Your Hit Parade.	
Unknown date	When Nat King Cole's television series is unable to get a sponsor, Frankie Laine is the first artist to cross TV's color line, foregoing his usual salary of $10,000.00 to become the first white artist to appear as a guest. Other major performers follow suit, including Mel Tormé and Tony Bennett, but, despite an increase in ratings, the show still fails to acquire a national sponsor.	
Unknown date	Westinghouse introduces the first rectangular tube color television. Due to issues with convergence (aligning the guns to get a single image), the sets are withdrawn from the market. Rectangular color tubes wouldn't be successfully sold until some time in the mid-1960s.	
Unknown date	Hollywood takes over New York as the dominant city where prime time TV programs were filmed, upgrading most of the TV genre, changing from live broadcasts to filmed series.	

== Television programs ==
=== Debuts ===
Date	Debut	Network
January 4	Blondie	NBC
January 4	Mr. Adams and Eve	CBS
February 4	Whirlybirds	Broadcast syndication
March 18	Tales of Wells Fargo	NBC
May 10	Date with the Angels	ABC
June	The New Adventures of Charlie Chan	Broadcast syndication
June 10	Tom Terrific	CBS
July 1	Richard Diamond, Private Detective	CBS
July 29	Tonight Starring Jack Paar	NBC
September 14	Have Gun – Will Travel	CBS
September 14	Sally	NBC
September 15	Bachelor Father	CBS
September 17	The Eve Arden Show	CBS
September 17	Sugarfoot	ABC
September 18	Wagon Train	NBC
September 19	Boots and Saddles	Broadcast syndication
September 20	M Squad	NBC
September 20	The Thin Man	NBC
September 21	Colonel Bleep	Broadcast syndication
September 21	Perry Mason	CBS
September 22	Maverick	ABC
September 23	The Restless Gun	NBC
September 24	The Californians	NBC
September 29	DuPont Show of the Month	CBS
September 30	Alcoa Theatre	NBC
September 30	Goodyear Theatre	NBC
September 30	Suspicion	NBC
September 30	Who Do You Trust?	ABC
October 3	The Real McCoys	ABC
October 4	The Court of Last Resort	NBC
October 4	Leave It to Beaver	CBS
October 4	Trackdown	CBS
October 7	How to Marry a Millionaire	Broadcast syndication
October 8	Casey Jones	Broadcast syndication
October 10	The Gray Ghost	Broadcast syndication
October 10	Zorro	ABC
October 11	Harbor Command	Broadcast syndication
October 14	Decoy	Broadcast syndication
October 16	Tombstone Territory	ABC
October 18	Colt .45	ABC
October 18	The Frank Sinatra Show	ABC
October 20	The Twentieth Century	CBS
November 1	26 Men	Broadcast syndication
November 6	The Lucy–Desi Comedy Hour	CBS
December 14	The Ruff and Reddy Show	NBC

=== Ending this year ===
Date	Show	Network	Debut	Notes
February 9	Science Fiction Theatre	Syndication	April 9, 1955	
February 22	Coke Time with Eddie Fisher	NBC	April 29, 1953	
February 24	Annie Oakley	First-run syndication	January 9, 1954	
February 27	The Adventures of Hiram Holliday	CBS	October 3, 1956	
March 11	Stanley	NBC	September 24, 1956	
March 16	You're on Your Own	CBS	December 22, 1956	
March 17	Mama	CBS	July 1, 1949	
March 26	Do You Trust Your Wife?	CBS	January 3, 1956	
April 8	Life is Worth Living	ABC	February 12, 1952 (on DuMont)	
April 14	Tales of the 77th Bengal Lancers	NBC	October 21, 1956	
May 5	Air Power	CBS	November 11, 1956	
May 6	I Love Lucy	CBS	October 15, 1951	
May 25	Caesar's Hour	NBC	September 27, 1954	
May 27	Producers' Showcase	NBC	October 18, 1954	
June 6	The Lone Ranger	ABC	September 15, 1949	
June 9	The Roy Rogers Show	NBC	December 30, 1951	
June 9	You Are There	CBS	February 1953	
June 12	The 20th Century Fox Hour	CBS	October 1955	
June 13	Washington Square	NBC	October 21, 1956	
June 14	Wire Service	ABC	October 4, 1956	
June 18	The Kaiser Aluminum Hour	NBC	July 3, 1956	
June 22	The Jackie Gleason Show	CBS	September 20, 1952	
June 24	Robert Montgomery Presents	NBC	January 30, 1950	
June 25	The Jonathan Winters Show	NBC	October 2, 1956	
June 26	Ford Theatre	ABC	October 17, 1948	
July 5	The West Point Story	CBS	October 5, 1956	
July 5	Blondie	NBC	January 4, 1957	
July 18	The Dinah Shore Show	NBC	November 27, 1951	
August 30	The Bob Crosby Show	CBS	September 14, 1953	Returned to the air on NBC for a run in the 1958 summer season
August 30	Kukla, Fran and Ollie	WBKB	October 13, 1947	
September 3	Conflict	ABC	September 18, 1956	
September 12	Lux Video Theatre	NBC	October 2, 1950 (on CBS)	
September 17	Summer Playhouse	NBC	July 6, 1954	
September 22	The Alcoa Hour	NBC	October 16, 1955	
September 28	Dollar a Second	NBC	September 20, 1953	
September 29	Goodyear Television Playhouse	NBC	October 14, 1951	
December 21	Circus Boy	CBS	September 23, 1956 (on NBC)	
December 26	Tales of the Texas Rangers	CBS	August 27, 1955	
December 27	The Sheriff of Cochise	NTA Film Network	September 21, 1956	

== Television stations ==
=== Station launches ===
Date	Market	Station	Channel	Affiliation	Notes/References
January 21	San Antonio, Texas	KONO-TV	12	ABC	Now KSAT-TV
February 6	Williston, North Dakota	KUMV-TV	8	NBC (primary); ABC/CBS (primary)	Semi-satellite of KMOT in Minot, North Dakota
March 1	Casper, Wyoming	KTWO-TV	2	CBS (primary); ABC/NBC (secondary)	
March 9	Monroe, Louisiana	KLSE	13	NBC	
March 18	Tupelo, Mississippi	WTWV	9	NBC (primary); ABC (secondary)	
April 1	New Orleans, Louisiana	WYES-TV	8	NET	Now a PBS affiliate, and on channel 12
April 28	Charlotte, North Carolina	WSOC-TV	9	NBC (primary); ABC (secondary)	
May 5	Honolulu, Hawaii	KHVH-TV	13	Independent	
May 22	Bryan, Texas	KBTX-TV	3	CBS (primary); ABC (secondary)	
May 28	Paducah, Kentucky	WPSD-TV	6	NBC	
June 29	Greenfield, Massachusetts	WRLP	32	NBC	
July 9	Kalispell, Montana	KGEZ-TV	9	Independent	
July 15	Reliance/Pierre, South Dakota	KPLO-TV	6	Satellite of KELO-TV/Sioux Falls	
July 24	Ensign, Kansas	KTVC	6	CBS	
August 2	Miami, Florida	WPST-TV	10	ABC	
September 1	Jacksonville, Florida	WFGA-TV	12	NBC (primary); ABC (secondary)	
September 1	Norfolk, Virginia	WAVY-TV	10	ABC	
September 1	Pittsburgh, Pennsylvania	WIIC-TV	11	NBC (primary); NTA Film Network (secondary)	
September 2	Wilmington, Delaware (Philadelphia, Pennsylvania)	WHYY-TV	35	NET	Now a PBS affiliate on channel 12
September 7	New Orleans, Louisiana	WWL-TV	4	CBS	
September 16	Minneapolis, Minnesota	KTCA	2	NET	
September 17	Omaha, Nebraska	KETV	7	ABC	
September 21	Hartford, Connecticut	WTIC-TV (original)	3	Independent	
September 28	Fort Wayne, Indiana	WPTA	21	ABC	
September 30	Lexington, Kentucky	WKYT-TV	27	Independent	
October 7	Corvallis, Oregon	KOAC-TV	7	NET	Part of Oregon Public Broadcasting
October 27	Beaumont, Texas	KPAC-TV	4	NBC	
October 28	Florence, Alabama	WOWL-TV	15	NBC	
October 28	Milwaukee, Wisconsin	WMVS	10	NET	
October 30	Indianapolis, Indiana	WLWI-TV	13	ABC	
November 1	Binghamton, New York	WINR-TV	40	NBC (primary); ABC (secondary)	
November 1	Glendive, Montana	KXGN-TV	5	CBS/NBC (joint primary); ABC (secondary)	
November 7	LaSalle, Illinois	WEEQ	35	NBC	Satellite of WEEK-TV/Peoria, Illinois
November 17	Clarksburg, West Virginia	WBOY-TV	12	ABC	
November 26	Boston, Massachusetts	WHDH-TV	5	ABC	
December 21	Amarillo, Texas	KVII-TV	7	ABC	
December 22	Riverton, Wyoming	KWRB-TV		ABC (primary); CBS/NBC (secondary)	

=== Network affiliation changes ===
Date	Market	Station	Channel	Old affiliation	New affiliation	References
August 31	Fort Worth/Dallas, Texas	WBAP-TV	5	NBC (primary); ABC (secondary)	NBC (exclusive)	
September 1	Dallas, Texas	WFAA	8	NBC	ABC	
October 27	Daytona Beach/Orlando, Florida	WESH-TV	2	Independent	NBC	

=== Station closures ===
Date	City of license/Market	Station	Channel	Affiliation	First air date	Notes/Ref.
February 13	Elmira, New York	WTVE	24	ABC	June 13, 1953	
September 8	Harrisburg, Pennsylvania	WCMB-TV	27	Independent	September 8, 1954	
April 13	Miami, Florida	WGBS-TV	23	NTA Film Network	December 24, 1954	
April 30	Portland, Oregon	KLOR	12	ABC	March 8, 1955	Merged with KPTV, which moved from channel 27 to channel 12
May 11	Winston-Salem/Greensboro, North Carolina	WTOB-TV	26	ABC	September 18, 1953	
May 31	Sacramento, California	KCCC-TV	40	Independent	September 30, 1953	
August 6	Tulare/Fresno, California	KVVG	27	Independent	November 16, 1953	
August 31	Pittsburgh, Pennsylvania	WENS	16	Independent	August 25, 1953	
October 25	Jacksonville, Florida	WJHP-TV	36	Independent	December 13, 1953	
October 31	Bethlehem, Pennsylvania	WLEV-TV	51	NBC	April 21, 1953	
November 1	Easton, Pennsylvania	WGLV	57	ABC	August 14, 1953	
December 31	Ann Arbor, Michigan	WPAG-TV	20	Independent	1953	
December 31	Raleigh, North Carolina	WNAO-TV	28	ABC (primary); CBS/NBC/DuMont (secondary)	July 12, 1953	
