= WFPG-TV =

Television station in Atlantic City, New Jersey (1952–1954)

Atlantic City, New Jersey; United States
- Channels: Analog: 46 (UHF)

Programming
- Affiliations: NBC (primary); CBS, ABC, DuMont (secondary)

Ownership
- Owner: Neptune Broadcasting Corporation

History
- First air date: December 21, 1952
- Last air date: May 17, 1954
- Call sign meaning: "World's Finest Playground"

Technical information
- ERP: 1 kW
- Transmitter coordinates: 39°43′43.6″N 74°50′39.6″W

WFPG-TV (channel 46) was a television station in Atlantic City, New Jersey, United States, which operated from December 1952 until May 1954. It was one of the earliest UHF stations in the country, and held affiliations with all four major networks of the era: NBC, CBS, ABC and DuMont.

== Background ==
Geographically, New Jersey is sandwiched between New York City and Philadelphia. Between them, the two large cities were granted most of the available VHF channels. The only VHF station assigned to New Jersey was located in Newark, the state's largest city. However, channel 13—WATV, later to become WNTA-TV (and now WNET)—was programmed as a New York City station. New York City was directly awarded channels 2, 4, 5, 7, 9 and 11; while Philadelphia was assigned channels 3, 6 and 10. Channel 8 became unavailable as it was given to Lancaster, Pennsylvania's WGAL-TV, and later to WNHC-TV (now WTNH) in New Haven, Connecticut. Around the same time, WDEL-TV in Wilmington, Delaware (later WVUE), moved to channel 12, which the Federal Communications Commission (FCC) reassigned to Wilmington to replace channel 7.

Prior to the opening of the UHF band in 1952, Atlantic City viewers could receive some of the Philadelphia stations. However, they could only be received with very large rooftop antennas, and signals were marginal even under the best conditions.

The use of a channel on the newly opened UHF TV band would allow Atlantic City to boast (in the words of one promotion to 1954-era convention-goers) "Operation of Atlantic City's own television station, WFPG-TV has begun, and it is expected that many national programs will visit here and originate their shows from 'On the Boardwalk in Atlantic City'."

Construction began on October 30, 1952—one day after locally-based Neptune Broadcasting Corporation, the owner of WFPG radio, was granted the channel 46 construction permit—and was completed 52 days later, with WFPG's AM broadcasts continuing uninterrupted while the new building and its UHF TV facilities were constructed around the existing radio operation.

While local television receiver vendors were initially hesitant to promote the then largely unproven UHF band, due both to unfamiliarity with the selection of antennae required for the higher frequencies and a lack of factory-installed UHF tuners in many TV sets, the ability to serve Atlantic City from even a relatively low-powered local station was to provide stronger signals and better-quality images in the local community than could be had at the time through the distant reception of Philadelphia VHF stations.

== Demise ==
As Philadelphia's VHF stations increased their transmitted signal power to cover a growing market, they were able to regain market share in various outlying communities in New Jersey and Pennsylvania, which already had local UHF stations of their own in 1953; along with WFPG-TV, they included WEEU-TV (channel 33) and WHUM-TV (channel 61) in Reading, Pennsylvania, and WSBA-TV (channel 43, now WPMT) in York, Pennsylvania. Consequently, WFPG-TV began dropping network shows in its waning months of operation until virtually nothing remained of its network-allocated schedule. As a result, channel 46 went off the air almost unnoticed on May 17, 1954.

It is not likely that WFPG-TV would have survived for long in any event, however. Shortly after WFPG-TV went dark, the FCC collapsed Atlantic City into the Philadelphia market. Almost immediately, the Philadelphia stations all secured construction permits to build tall towers in the Roxborough neighborhood, on some of the highest ground in the region. The new towers enabled the Philadelphia stations to provide a clear signal to all of South Jersey, including Atlantic City.

While WFPG-TV is no longer on the air, its radio siblings continued operation. WFPG-FM 96.9 and WFPG (now WPGG) AM 1450 currently operate from studios in Northfield with the original callsign still in active use on FM radio. The WFPG-TV tower also still stands; the facilities built for channel 46 now house the transmitter facilities for WMID 1340 and 99.3 WZBZ radio.

Local TV broadcasting did not return to Atlantic City until January 25, 1966, when WCMC-TV (channel 40, now WMGM-TV) signed on as an affiliate of NBC.
