= WFMZ =

WFMZ may refer to:

- WFMZ (FM), a radio station (104.9 FM) licensed to Hertford, North Carolina, United States
- WFMZ-TV, a television station (channel 9 digital) licensed to Allentown, Pennsylvania, United States
  - WFMZ-TV (channel 67) (1954–1955), a former television station in Allentown, Pennsylvania, on channel 67
- WLEV, a radio station (100.7 FM) licensed to Allentown, Pennsylvania, which held the WFMZ call sign from 1947 to 1997
