= KJWY =

KJWY may refer to:

- K36QX-D, a low-power television station (channel 36, virtual 21) licensed to Salem, Oregon, United States, which used the callsign KJWY-LD from 2013 to 2026
- WDPN-TV, a television station (channel 2) licensed to Wilmington, Delaware, United States, formerly licensed to Jackson, Wyoming, which used the call sign KJWY from 1996 to 2013
