= WSPZ =

WSPZ may refer to:

- WSPZ-LD, a low-power television station (channel 19) licensed to serve DuBois, Pennsylvania, United States
- WQOF, a radio station (1260 AM) licensed to serve Washington, D.C., United States
