= PPTN =

PPTN may refer to:

- Pedunculopontine tegmental nucleus, a part of the brainstem
- Pennsylvania Public Television Network, a Pennsylvania state agency that funded and supported Public television stations
