= WTVU =

WTVU may refer to:

- WTVU-CD, a low-power television station (channel 25, virtual 22) licensed to serve Syracuse, New York, United States
- WCTX, a television station (channel 10, virtual 59) licensed to serve New Haven, Connecticut, United States, which held the call sign WTVU from 1995 to 1996
- WTVU (Scranton, Pennsylvania), a television station (channel 73) that operated from 1953 to 1955
