= WXTM =

WXTM may refer to:

- WXTM-LD, a low-power television station (channel 18) licensed to serve Erie, Pennsylvania, United States; see List of television stations in Pennsylvania
- WKRK-FM, a radio station (92.3 FM) licensed to serve Cleveland Heights, Ohio, United States, which held the call sign WXTM from 2001 to 2006
