= LVN =

LVN may refer to:

- Littlehaven railway station (National Rail station code), in West Sussex, England
- Licensed Vocational Nurse, see Licensed practical nurse
- LVN Pictures, film studio
- Airlake Airport in Minnesota, USA
- Lehigh Valley News, local online news website for the Lehigh Valley
