= Lehigh Valley News =

American newspaper

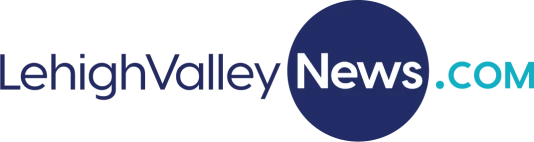
- Type: Online newspaper
- Format: Electronic publishing
- Owner: Lehigh Valley Public Media
- Editor: Jim Deegan
- Founded: October 2022
- Language: English
- Headquarters: 839 Sesame Street, Bethlehem, Pennsylvania, U.S.
- Website: lehighvalleynews.com

Lehigh Valley News is an online newspaper serving the Lehigh Valley in eastern Pennsylvania.

== History ==
Lehigh Valley News was founded in October 2022 under the auspices of John J. Moser, the president of news at WLVT-TV, and his vice president Jim Deegan. Moser is an industry veteran who worked as a music correspondent for The Morning Call for 30 years, and served as assistant metro editor and editor of its offices in Bethlehem, Lehighton and Quakertown. The pair sought to "revitalize" local news, and to become the leading media company in the Lehigh Valley. Moser would become deputy director, while Deegan would become executive editor.

Lehigh Valley News is owned by Lehigh Valley Public Media, the same company that owns Allentown-licensed PBS affiliate WLVT-TV and NPR affiliate WLVR-FM, licensed in Bethlehem. The site exists solely online and states that they seek to "provide credible, valuable journalism that allows our communities to make informed decisions."

The site regularly hosts live debates, televised on WLVT-TV, between candidates for political office ahead of elections. In 2022, it held a debate between candidates Susan Wild and Lisa Scheller during their closely-contested race for Pennsylvania's 7th congressional district. The debate was also broadcast by C-SPAN. The following April, Lehigh Valley News hosted another debate between two candidates for Northampton County district attorney ahead of the municipal primary.

Starting in 2023, in partnership with the Lehigh Valley Economic Development Corporation (LVEDC) and Muhlenberg College, Lehigh Valley News releases an annual Lehigh Valley Quality of Life Survey. The survey uses a sample size of 625 residents. In January 2026, Lehigh Valley Public Media CEO Hasanna Birdsong announced layoffs that affected a significant number of employees in the newsroom.
