= WLVR-FM =

- Bethlehem, Pennsylvania; United States
- Broadcast area: Lehigh Valley
- Frequency: 91.3 MHz (HD Radio)
- Branding: 91.3 WLVR

Programming
- Language: English
- Format: News/talk
- Subchannels: HD2: Variety
- Affiliations: National Public Radio

Ownership
- Owner: Lehigh University
- Operator: HD1: Lehigh Valley Public Media

History
- First air date: 1973
- Call sign meaning: "Lehigh Valley Radio"

Technical information
- Licensing authority: FCC
- Facility ID: 36984
- Class: A
- ERP: 40 watts horizontal polarization; 200 watts vertical
- HAAT: 170 meters (560 ft)
- Transmitter coordinates: 40°36′4.3″N 75°21′32.6″W

Links
- Public license information: Public file; LMS
- Webcast: Listen live
- Website: www.wlvr.org; HD2: go.wlvr.org

WLVR-FM (91.3 MHz) is a non-commercial FM radio station in Bethlehem, Pennsylvania. Owned by Lehigh University, it is co-operated with Lehigh Valley Public Media, licensee and operator of PBS member station WLVT-TV (channel 39). WLVR-FM is supported in part by listener donations. WLVR includes local news coverage produced by a team of multimedia journalists from Lehigh Valley Public Media. The station is overseen by Christine Dempsey, Senior Vice President of Radio at Lehigh Valley Public Media.

WLVR-FM broadcasts with an effective radiated power of 40 watts (horizontal) and 200 watts (vertical). The transmitter is located on Lehigh University's campus, and the studios are co-located with WLVT-TV at the Univest Public Media Center on the SteelStacks Campus on Sesame Street in the south side of Bethlehem. The station uses HD Radio technology.

== Programming ==
WLVR-FM airs news and public affairs programming from National Public Radio (NPR), including Morning Edition and All Things Considered. Other programming includes Marketplace (from American Public Media), 1A, The World and BBC World Service. Weekend shows include Wait, Wait, Don't Tell Me, The Moth Radio Hour, Ask Me Another and You Bet Your Garden.

A digital subchannel, WLVR-HD-2, carries Lehigh University's student-run college radio programming. Content includes genres such as active rock, alternative rock, hip hop, jazz, world music and other genres.

Both WLVR 91.3 and Lehigh University 91.3 WLVR-HD-2 are available for online streaming at WLVR.org.

== History ==
WLVR-FM went on the air in 1973 as the college radio station at Lehigh University. It was the successor to WLRN, a campus AM radio station that had been started by The Brown and White in 1946.

In October 2019, WLVR-FM's programming was turned over to Lehigh Valley Public Media, owner of PBS station WLVT-TV (channel 39). The station relaunched as a news/talk-focused NPR station on November 1, 2019, following a soft launch "test phase"; the student-run programming moved to a new second HD Radio channel. Some NPR programming was already available in the Lehigh Valley through WDIY in Allentown; the region was also served by translators of WVIA-FM from Scranton, WRTI and WXPN from Philadelphia, and WWFM from Trenton, New Jersey, though only WVIA-FM offered a full-time news and talk lineup.

On June 11, 2026, Lehigh University announced that it would sell the WLVR-FM license to Lehigh Valley Public Media for $55,000. The university noted that student engagement had largely moved from radio to podcasts and other on-demand digital media, and that Lehigh Valley Public Media would determine the future of the student-run HD2 channel.

== Awards ==
WLVR-HD2 (Lehigh University) has received the Lehigh Valley Music Award for best College/Community Radio Station in three consecutive years. A.J. Fritz has also received the award for Best College/Community Radio Personality in several consecutive years.

In 1972, the station's program director, Jim Cameron, received a Major Armstrong Award from Columbia University for his documentary "Old Friends". The award is named after the inventor of FM radio.

== See also ==
- Media in the Lehigh Valley
