= Lebanon Valley =

Valley in Pennsylvania, United States

Coordinates: 40.453°N 76.493°W

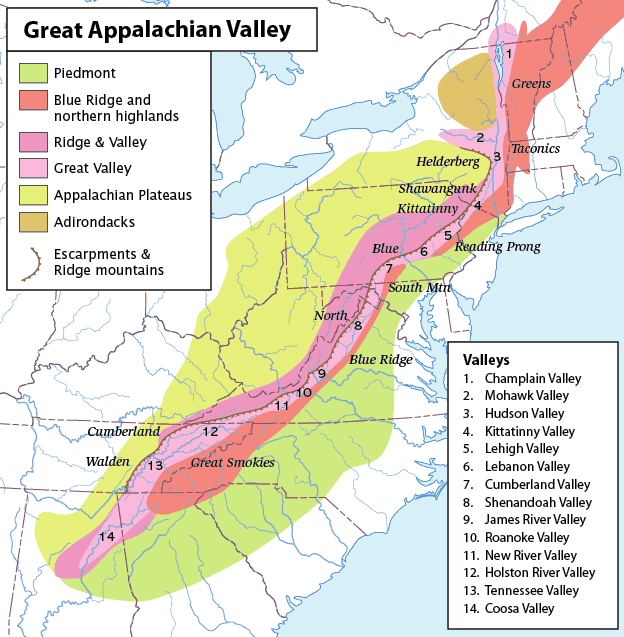
- The Great Appalachian Valley includes the Lebanon Valley (6) depicted southeast of the Ridge-and-Valley Appalachians and between the Cumberland (7) and Lehigh (5) valleys.

- Location within Pennsylvania

Geography
- Location: Lebanon County; Berks County
- Population centers: Harrisburg, Lebanon, Reading
- Borders on: Ridge-and-Valley Appalachians (north); South Mountain (south); Susquehanna River (west); Lehigh Valley (east)
- Interactive map of Lebanon Valley

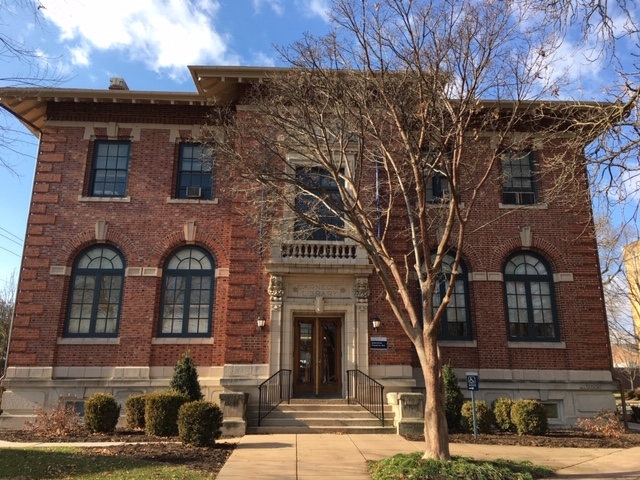
Lebanon Valley College in Annville Township, Pennsylvania

The Lebanon Valley is a geographic region that lies between South Mountain and the Ridge and Valley Province of eastern Pennsylvania. The valley lies almost entirely within Lebanon and Berks counties in Pennsylvania. Portions of the valley lie in eastern Dauphin and northern Lancaster counties in Pennsylvania. It is bound to its southwest by the Susquehanna River and to its northeast by the adjoining Lehigh Valley.

The Lebanon Valley is part of the much longer Great Appalachian Valley, also called the Great Valley, a natural lowland route running northeast–southwest and lying just inland from the Blue Ridge Mountains and South Mountain. The Great Valley, including the Lebanon Valley, has historically been admired for its fertile agricultural land. Beyond the southwestern end of the Lebanon Valley, the Great Valley is known locally as the Cumberland Valley. To the northeast the Great Valley is known locally as the Lehigh Valley. Lebanon Valley College is named for the region. The western part of the valley lies within the Chesapeake Bay watershed. The eastern part lies within the Delaware River watershed.

== History ==
The valley was first inhabited in the 1720s by settlers of German origin. The Cornwall iron mine, located in the hills above the Lebanon valley and the largest iron-producer in Pennsylvania, began mining in 1740. The Union Canal ran through the Lebanon valley and operated from the 1790s to the 1880s.

== Lebanon Valley cities ==
=== Principal cities ===
- Harrisburg
- Lebanon
- Reading

=== Other cities ===
- Annville
- Cornwall
- Hershey
- Palmyra

== See also ==
- Great Appalachian Valley
- Lebanon Valley College
- Lebanon Valley Railroad
- Susquehanna Valley
