= Scholastic Scrimmage =

American television quiz show

Scholastic Scrimmage is the title of several televised quiz bowl programs featuring high school students in the U.S. state of Pennsylvania. In each program, two teams of four players from Pennsylvania high schools field questions on a diverse range of academic subjects and score points with correct answers. The winners of each game advance in a competitive, season-long tournament.

The original began production in 1975 at WLVT-TV in the Lehigh Valley. A total of four versions have been produced by different public TV stations in Pennsylvania, with three in active production.

== History ==
=== Lehigh Valley ===
Scholastic Scrimmage first aired on WLVT-TV on January 15, 1975, with 14 participating schools. The program was designed by WLVT's founding general manager, Shel Siegel, and Frank Dobias, director of school services. It was hosted by Harry Price, then working at Lehigh University. Participation grew to 25 schools by the 1978–79 season, when underwriter Air Products offered scholarships for the first time to the top two finishing teams. In the 1980s, the program received awards from the American Legion and the Pennsylvania Association of Broadcasters. Price was the moderator for the program's first 21 seasons, leaving when his day job at the Hill School in Pottstown. He was replaced by Jim Davis and later by Karen Walton.

=== Other versions ===
WPSX-TV (after 2006 WPSU-TV) in State College debuted a version of Scholastic Scrimmage in 2004. The first host was Katie O'Toole, who left the station that same year. In the 2006–07 season, 82 regional schools participated, up from 24 in the inaugural year, with David Price hosting. After the 2009–10 Pennsylvania budget defunded state support for public television, Scholastic Scrimmage—one of the most expensive local programs WPSU-TV produced—was canceled.

WVIA-TV in Scranton debuted its own version in 2006 with 39 participating school districts, hosted by Julie Knaus and Regina Myers. The WVIA version was directly inspired by that at WLVT.

WQLN in Erie began producing its own version in 2022, hosted by Glenn Holland.
