= Summit Lawn, Pennsylvania =

Unincorporated village in Pennsylvania, U.S.

Coordinates: 40°33′33″N 75°26′01″W

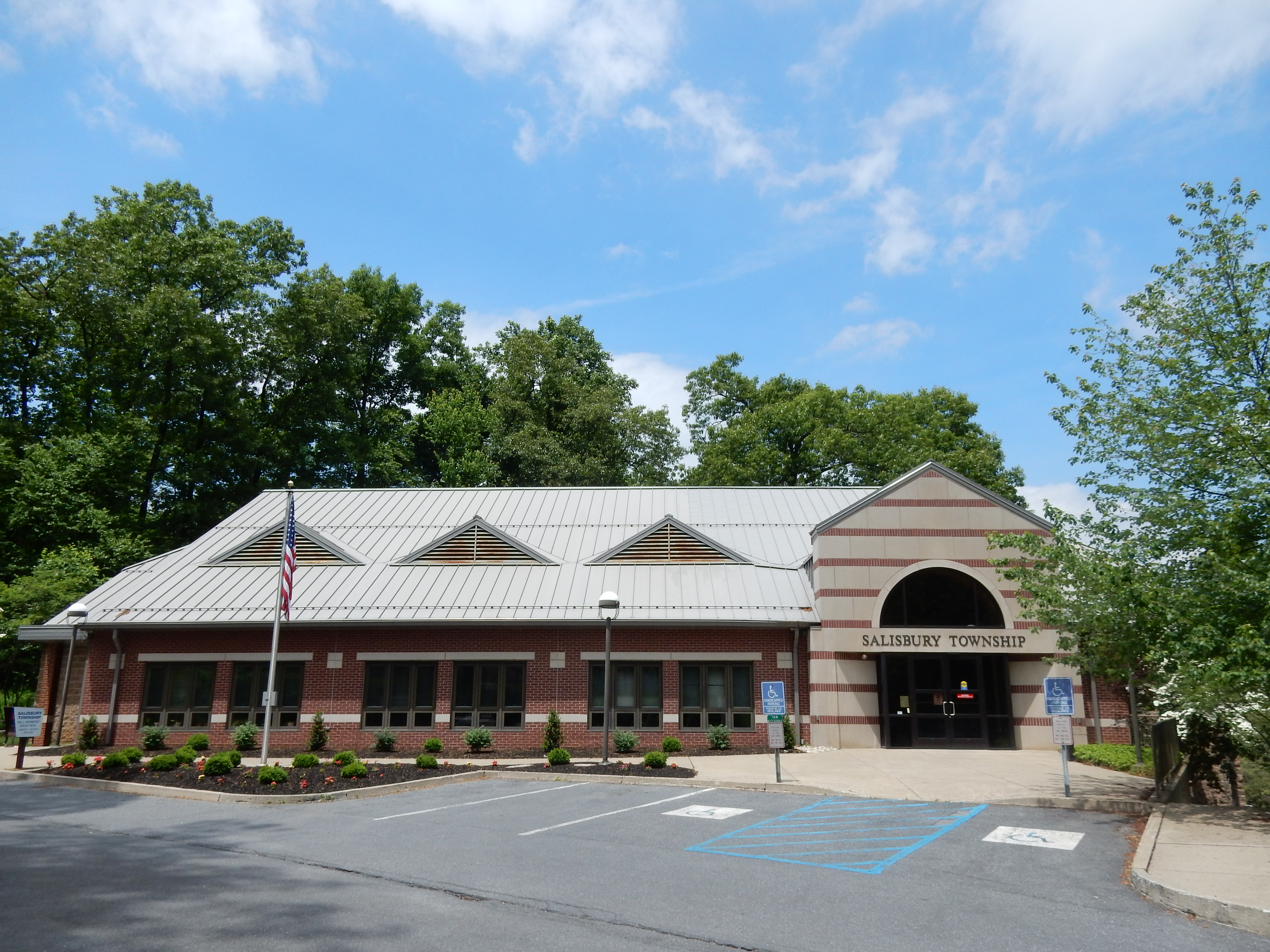
Salisbury Township Building in June 2015

Summit Lawn is a small unincorporated village that is located in Lehigh County, Pennsylvania. It is part of the Lehigh Valley, which has a population of 861,899 and is the 68th-most populous metropolitan area in the U.S. as of the 2020 census.

== History and geography ==
Parts of Summit Lawn are situated in Upper Saucon Township while others are located in Salisbury Township.

The village sits on South Mountain, near Interstate 78 and Pennsylvania Route 309. It has been assigned the Allentown ZIP Code of 18103 by the United States Postal Service.

WFMZ-TV, a Lehigh Valley television station, is located here, as are the government offices of Salisbury Township.

== Transportation ==
Pennsylvania Route 145 runs through Summit Lawn.
