= WEEU-TV =

Television station in Reading, Pennsylvania (1953–1955)

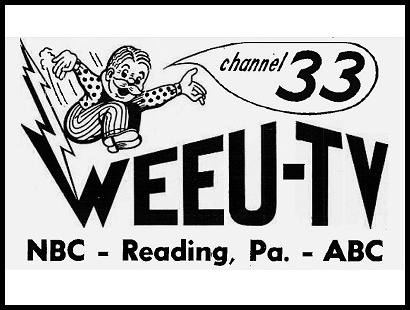
- Reading, Pennsylvania; United States
- Channels: Analog: 33 (UHF)

Programming
- Affiliations: NBC, ABC

Ownership
- Owner: Hawley Broadcasting Company
- Sister stations: WEEU

History
- First air date: April 15, 1953
- Last air date: June 30, 1955; (2 years, 76 days)

Technical information
- ERP: 167 kW
- HAAT: 316 m (1,036 ft)
- Transmitter coordinates: 40°21′08″N 75°53′55″W

WEEU-TV (channel 33) was a television station in Reading, Pennsylvania, United States, which operated between 1953 and 1955. It was owned by the Hawley Broadcasting Company alongside radio station WEEU (850 AM). The station ceased broadcasting because of the economic difficulties associated with early ultra high frequency (UHF) television stations.

== History ==
WEEU-TV began commercial broadcasting on April 15, 1953, as an extension of the radio station; the transmitter on Mount Penn had been radiating test patterns since April 9. Airing NBC and ABC programming, the station operated on a reduced-power basis for the first month and a half until it was ready to broadcast at its full authorized power.

Prior to the passage of the All-Channel Receiver Act in 1964, receiving UHF television stations like WEEU-TV and competitor WHUM-TV (channel 61)—which signed on in February—typically required a converter. Channel 33 worked with TV dealers and salesmen to go door-to-door to promote UHF conversions and the WEEU-TV program lineup. The local lineup included news, weather and sports programs, as well as Studio Date, a program for teenagers hosted by William Webber, later a children's television personality in Philadelphia. The station also produced other entertainment programs, including a cooking show and a quiz show titled "Know Your Reading".

The electronic curtain has been drawn, and WEEU-TV, Reading, Pennsylvania, now joins the long list of Ultra High Frequency television stations across the nation that have found it necessary to withdraw from operations because of the economic instability that is plaguing UHF broadcasting.

— excerpt from official announcement of closure, published June 28, 1955

On June 28, 1955, Hawley Broadcasting announced that it would cease operation of WEEU-TV on June 30. In a full-page advertisement that ran in the Eagle and then in Broadcasting magazine, the next week, the company declared that it had closed the television station due to the "tremendous operating costs" involved and the "apathy" of national advertisers. The move came as more viewers tuned to the more powerful—and VHF—signals of Philadelphia's network stations.

The channel 33 allocation was immediately considered to be shifted. In 1957, the FCC instituted a rulemaking proceeding to decide between two proposals by other UHF stations to move channel 33 to York or Harrisburg. At year's end, WEEU-TV surrendered the construction permit, which it still held. By that time, fellow UHF outlet WHUM-TV had closed as well.

While the tower has been removed, the former transmitter building is still in use for a number of FM translators, as well as a translator for WFMZ-TV of Allentown. It was also used by WTVE when that station started in 1980; it left Reading and moved into Philadelphia proper in 2017.
