= WFMZ-TV (channel 67) =

Television station in Allentown, Pennsylvania (1954–1955)

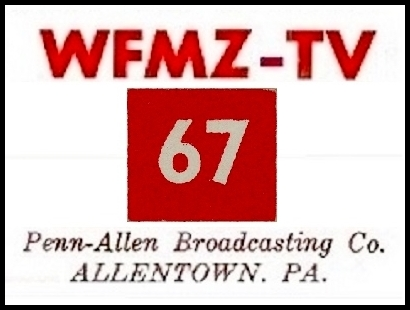
- Allentown, Pennsylvania; United States
- Channels: Analog: 67 (UHF)

Programming
- Affiliations: Independent

Ownership
- Owner: Penn-Allen Broadcasting Company, Inc.
- Sister stations: WFMZ (FM)

History
- First air date: December 4, 1954
- Last air date: April 15, 1955

Technical information
- ERP: 79.4 kW
- HAAT: 296 m (970 ft)
- Transmitter coordinates: 40°33′59″N 75°26′3″W

WFMZ-TV (channel 67) was an independent television station in Allentown, Pennsylvania, United States, which broadcast from December 4, 1954, to April 15, 1955. Owned by the Penn-Allen Broadcasting Company, it was sister to radio station WFMZ (100.7 FM). WFMZ-TV failed due to economic issues inherent in early UHF broadcasting and the availability of network-affiliated stations from Philadelphia.

Two decades after WFMZ-TV's short existence, WFMZ radio's new owners started another television station using the same call letters in 1976, which still operates.

== History ==
The owners of FM radio outlet WFMZ (100.7 FM) received a construction permit for a new channel 67 television station in Allentown on July 16, 1953; the grant came after radio station WHOL withdrew its competing application for the channel. The station's studios, located along North 7th Street Pike at Grape Street, were the third-largest in Pennsylvania. When the 500-foot (150 m) tower was completed, officials climbed it and smashed a bottle of champagne against the top of the mast, christening it "Miss Ultra High".

The station began broadcasting December 4, 1954; it relied on live and local programming as its primary attraction, though it also aired some syndicated shows. The station's local productions included a version of the franchised Romper Room children's program, teenage dance program Bandstand 67, and a live Saturday Nite Hoedown. However, few watched. Its inability to secure network affiliation was costly at a time when viewers felt they were already well served by network affiliates from Philadelphia. Additionally, Penn-Allen was in a dispute over unpaid money from some of its stockholders, who had not invested promised amounts in the firm. As a result, Penn-Allen announced the "temporary" suspension of operations of WFMZ-TV, to take place on April 15, 1955; it hoped to return the station to the air when the disputes were settled.

After the station failed, Penn-Allen Broadcasting Company made a push at the Federal Communications Commission (FCC) to allow the station to serve as a trial outlet for one of several competing subscription television systems, an idea that met opposition from fellow Lehigh Valley UHF outlet WLEV-TV, the National Association of Broadcasters and CBS. As a result, the FCC rejected the idea in March 1956, stating that it wanted to study the "whole question" of subscription television. The FCC's denial did not deter Kohn, who testified in front of a United States Senate committee in April 1956, advocating for a subscription television authorization in order to allow WFMZ-TV as a whole to return to service. As late as 1958, Kohn was still advocating for such demonstrations and called their opponents the "same interests who choked off FM and UHF". The construction permit was not canceled until November 1964.

The channel 67 building was sold in 1958 and converted to other commercial uses. However, it almost was returned to its original purpose nearly a decade later. Mack Trucks, which was headquartered in Allentown, filed in March 1967 for a construction permit for a station on channel 69—the FCC UHF table of allotments having been overhauled two years prior—and was granted the permit in mid-July. Mack then expressed interest in the former WFMZ-TV studios. The station, which Mack claimed would have been affiliated with a major network, was eventually tabled in 1968, after Mack determined it could not secure an affiliation.

Kohn would buy full ownership of WFMZ radio in 1958; the station was sold two more times in the next decade. More than a decade after Maranatha Broadcasting Company had acquired WFMZ in 1964—and more than 20 years after the first WFMZ-TV closed down—the company filed to build a new WFMZ-TV, pointing out that Allentown had not had a TV station since channel 67's demise. The new station signed on November 25, 1976.
