= The Worship Network =

American broadcast television network

- Country: United States

Ownership
- Owner: The Christian Network, Inc.
- Key people: Bud Paxson (Founder); Paul S. Williams (Chairman of the Board of Stewards); Dustin Rubeck (President); Bruce Koblish (Chief Executive Officer)
- Sister channels: Praise TV

History
- Launched: 1992; 33 years ago
- Closed: 2013

Links
- Website: worship.net

The Worship Network, or Worship, was a broadcast television service that provided alternative Christian worship-themed programming 24 hours a day, seven days a week. The network was based in Nashville, Tennessee, in the United States, and is available in more than 50 countries. It was owned by The Christian Network, Inc. (CNI), a church which also owned Worship's defunct sister network, Praise TV.

The network was broadcast on a digital subchannel of ION Television's owned and operated stations placed after Ion Plus on a station's digital channel map, usually broadcasting on the -DT4 subchannel. However, ION dropped the network from its stations on January 31, 2010.

== History ==
The Worship Network (launched through CNI) was founded in 1992 by Lowell W. "Bud" Paxson, co-founder of HSN, who later founded the PAX TV network (now ION Television). Paxson, an evangelical Christian since 1985, wanted to "create an atmosphere in the home to inspire and encourage a quiet time to worship God" and from that vision, Worship was launched.

Outlets for the new network increased rapidly. By 1994, there were 50 affiliate stations and Worship had just begun its first European affiliate, in Iceland, and a year later, the number had doubled to 100 affiliates and the network had launched in Asia, in the region of Taiwan. In 1996, the network began satellite broadcasting, via Sky Angel.

When the PAX TV network was launched in 1998, Worship provided overnight programming, and in 2005, PAX TV and Worship struck a deal where the network would be carried on a digital subchannel of PAX TV stations 24 hours a day, seven days a week. In 2006, the network had more than 250 broadcast affiliates, and is available on every inhabited continent. In 2006, the network began producing shows in HD (high definition), although it does not broadcast in HD. In 2010, Worship was dropped from digital Ion Television owned-and-operated stations.

The Worship Network ceased updating its Web site and social media in 2013. In January 2015, in a statement mourning Paxson's death, The Worship Network's parent company stated it was still operating the network and would "continue to do our best" to keep it running according to Paxson's vision. Most of the channels that had carried The Worship Network programming in overnights have since flipped to Radiant TV, an unrelated but similarly formatted network produced by WLMB.

== Programming ==
The Worship Network's main program, called "Worship", consisted simply of Bible scriptures displayed on a nature backdrop, while a mix of contemporary Christian worship music, traditional hymns and light classical music played in the background. Interspersed among the videos and music are brief stories of faith, narrated by worship leaders.

From 2005, when the network began their 24/7 digital broadcast, other forms of programming were added to this mix. Newer programs included infomercials featuring Christian products, comedy specials featuring Christian comedians, and concerts produced by Worship.

== Expanded distribution ==
The Worship Network programming was available from several other sources apart from their 24/7 digital broadcast. The NRB Network on DirecTV played Worship during the early morning hours. Sky Angel carries a 24/7 feed of Worship on its IPTV platform. Worship provided a 24/7 live stream of its broadcast as well as much of its programming via on-demand streaming from its official website. Many of Worship's programs were available on DVD, also available at the official website.
