= Pennsylvania Public Television Network =

Pennsylvania state agency

The Pennsylvania Public Television Network (PPTN) was the state agency that funded and supported public television stations within the Commonwealth of Pennsylvania. Its funding was eliminated in the Commonwealth's 2009–2010 budget and transferred to the Public Television Technology appropriation in the Executive Offices (Office of Administration). The motif of PPTN has since been revived as Pennsylvania PBS.

== Member stations ==
- WLVT-TV in Allentown
- WQLN in Erie
- WITF-TV in Harrisburg
- WHYY-TV and WPPT in Philadelphia
- WQED in Pittsburgh
- WVIA-TV in Scranton/Wilkes-Barre/Hazleton
- WPSU-TV in State College
