= WDIY =

- Allentown, Pennsylvania; United States
- Broadcast area: Lehigh Valley
- Frequency: 88.1 MHz
- Branding: Lehigh Valley Public Radio

Programming
- Language: English
- Format: Community/Public Radio (Program Schedule)
- Affiliations: National Public Radio

Ownership
- Owner: Lehigh Valley Community Broadcasters Association, Inc.

History
- First air date: January 8, 1995
- Call sign meaning: Do It Yourself

Technical information
- Licensing authority: FCC
- Facility ID: 36992
- Class: A
- ERP: 300 watts
- HAAT: 257 meters (843 ft)
- Transmitter coordinates: 40°33′54.00″N 75°26′26.00″W
- Translator: See § Translators

Links
- Public license information: Public file; LMS
- Webcast: Listen Live
- Website: www.wdiy.org

WDIY (88.1 FM) is a community-run public radio station licensed to Allentown, Pennsylvania with studios in Bethlehem and a transmitter atop South Mountain. A member of NPR, the station serves the Lehigh Valley region of eastern Pennsylvania, as well as parts of western New Jersey.

WDIY has an air staff of over 90 volunteers and a professional staff of five employees, including an executive director. The station is licensed to the Lehigh Valley Community Broadcasters Association, Inc., a nonprofit organization whose mission "is to engage the Lehigh Valley community through a wide-ranging exchange of music, arts, news and culturally diverse information."

== Background ==
WDIY began broadcasting on January 8, 1995, operating at 100 watts. Before then, the Lehigh Valley was one of the few areas of Pennsylvania without a locally-based NPR station. WHYY-FM in Philadelphia provides grade B coverage to most of the Lehigh Valley, while WVIA-FM in Scranton has long operated low-powered translators serving parts of the region.

While WDIY's transmitting power was low for a full NPR member, its antenna on top of South Mountain enabled the station to reach most of the immediate Lehigh Valley region. In 2015, the Federal Communications Commission approved a request to triple the station's power to 300 watts. The power increase significantly expanded WDIY's reach, enabling the station to serve a coverage area of over a half-million people. Its full broadcast area now extends 70 miles, from Clinton, New Jersey to the eastern edge of Reading, Pennsylvania.

As a public broadcast station, WDIY depends on listener support as one of its major sources of revenue.

== Programming ==
WDIY's program schedule includes NPR's Morning Edition, Fresh Air with Terry Gross and All Things Considered weekdays, with classical music and adult album alternative between the NPR offerings. Early evenings Monday through Friday feature locally-produced public affairs programs. On weeknights and weekends, the station broadcasts an extensive variety of music, including folk, blues, electronic, jazz, world music, alternative rock, classical, and avant-garde. The station also carries NPR's Weekend Edition on Saturday and Sunday mornings, On the Media from WNYC-FM in New York City on Saturday mornings, and Sing Out! Radio Magazine on Sunday mornings.

== Broadcast area ==
WDIY began broadcasting on 88.1 FM at 100 watts. Even though its South Mountain transmitter was at 843 feet above average terrain, the station had a relatively limited reach, confined for the most part to Lehigh and Northampton counties. Easton, the region's third-largest city, on the eastern edge of Northampton County, only received a grade B signal. To improve its Easton coverage, WDIY installed a translator at 93.9, which also serves neighboring Warren County in New Jersey. With its power increase to 300 watts in 2015, WDIY covers not only the Valley but now can be heard in the surrounding regions of eastern Pennsylvania as well as additional parts of western New Jersey.

Call sign	Frequency	City of license	FID	ERP (W)	HAAT	Class	Transmitter coordinates	FCC info
W230AG	93.9 FM	Easton, Pennsylvania	36994	7	−7 m (−23 ft)	D	40°41′53″N 75°12′30″W	LMS

== See also ==
- Media in the Lehigh Valley
- List of community radio stations in the United States
