= WGLV (TV) =

Television station in Easton, Pennsylvania (1953–1957)

- Easton, Pennsylvania; United States
- Channels: Analog: 57 (UHF)

Programming
- Affiliations: ABC, DuMont

Ownership
- Owner: Easton Publishing Co.; (WGLV Inc.)
- Sister stations: WEEX, WEEX-FM

History
- First air date: August 14, 1953
- Last air date: October 31, 1957

Technical information
- ERP: 100 kW
- HAAT: 1,063 feet (324 m)
- Transmitter coordinates: 40°37′35″N 75°15′19″W

WGLV (channel 57) was a television station in Easton, Pennsylvania, United States, which operated from August 1953 to October 1957. It was owned by the Easton Publishing Company, publisher of the Easton Express newspaper, and broadcast programming from ABC and the DuMont Television Network. It was the second station in the Lehigh Valley, which at one point had three local UHF outlets. However, largely due to power increases from competing very high frequency (VHF) stations in Philadelphia and New York City, WGLV left the air on October 31, 1957.

== History ==
When the Federal Communications Commission (FCC) ended its four-year freeze on television stations in 1952 and established the ultra high frequency (UHF) band for television broadcasting, the Lehigh Valley received four channel allotments: two in Allentown, one in Bethlehem, and channel 57 in Easton. A preexisting application by Easton Publishing, which had specified channel 8, was amended after the freeze to specify channel 57. The commission granted a construction permit to the company on December 18, 1952.

Construction took place in the early part of 1953. In addition to securing affiliation with ABC and DuMont, work took place to erect a transmitter building and interim studio on Gaffney Hill in Williams Township. WGLV promised stronger signals than those put into the area by the very high frequency (VHF) stations in Philadelphia, as well as regional news coverage. The first day of telecasting was August 14, 1953. Two days prior, in a demonstration staged by DuMont Laboratories, journalists saw WGLV-TV pictures on a set in the upper floors of the Empire State Building in New York City.

WGLV moved its studios from Gaffney Hill to a former school building, dubbed "Television Center", in January 1955.

October 31, 1957, marked the end of an era in Lehigh Valley television. Within 24 hours of each other, NBC affiliate WLEV-TV in Bethlehem and WGLV both received permission to go silent, and both did so on the same night. WGLV declared that FCC policies had made UHF survival unworkable in the market, particularly after the commission granted power and coverage increases to existing VHF stations in the region; this came even though Variety called WGLV "one of the best equipped U[HF] stations in the country". The former studio building was sold to two Easton doctors in 1959.
