= WHUM-TV =

Television station in Reading, Pennsylvania (1953–1956)

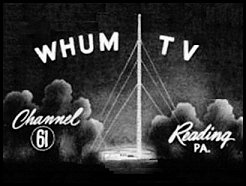
- Reading, Pennsylvania; United States
- Channels: Analog: 61 (UHF)

Programming
- Affiliations: CBS (1953−1956); ABC (1955−1956)

Ownership
- Owner: Eastern Radio Corp.

History
- First air date: February 22, 1953
- Last air date: September 4, 1956
- Call sign meaning: Named for owner Humboldt J. Greig

Technical information
- ERP: 260 kW
- HAAT: 544 m (1,784 ft)
- Transmitter coordinates: 40°31′36″N 76°13′30″W

WHUM-TV (channel 61) was a television station in Reading, Pennsylvania, United States. Owned by Humboldt Greig alongside WHUM (1240 AM), the station—Reading's first—broadcast from 1953 to 1956. It boasted the first ever high-powered UHF transmission facility, which spurred industry interest but also caused some technical issues; the station ultimately suffered from many of the same economic problems that befell other early UHF television outlets.

== Establishment ==
On August 7, General Electric announced that it would supply the equipment for the WHUM-TV facility in a contract worth $450,000. After a "frustrating" clerical error at the FCC—the assignment of an unsuitable channel 55 to Reading, prompting both of Reading's TV applicants to file for channel 61, only for the other to choose channel 33—that ended any hope of being the first station to air, WHUM-TV was granted its construction permit in the first week of September. From there, the eagerness of WHUM owner Humboldt J. Greig took over; he planned to have bulldozers on the site the date the permit was awarded. While KPTV in Portland, Oregon, would be first to air, WHUM-TV's launch was looked at with interest by the industry because of its superior technical facility, introduction of UHF into an existing VHF market, and the presence of community antenna television systems that would redistribute the signal. Greig promised the station would operate in the black financially.

As construction proceeded, WHUM-TV traveled the region with a mobile unit, giving demonstrations of television; promotional materials hyped the coming of the "world's most powerful television station" and boasted that channel 61 would have more power than all the TV stations in New York and Philadelphia combined. State police were necessary to manage the crowds who witnessed the erection of the mast, billed as taller than the Eiffel Tower. Tower construction was completed at the start of December. After delays in getting the station's wave guide transmission line—used instead of coaxial cable to avoid excessive line loss on the tall tower—to work to specifications, test patterns went out on February 9 and the station began telecasting as a CBS network affiliate—matching WHUM radio—on February 22, making it the 10th UHF television station to air. The station had easy access to network coaxial cable, which already ran a block away from its studios.

WHUM-TV boasted one of the most impressive facilities in early UHF broadcasting and was described by Television Digest as "the first high-powered UHF station". The tower rose 1,036 feet (316 m) from atop a site on Blue Mountain near Summit Station, delivering a signal with an effective radiated power of 260,000 watts—then the highest in use at any UHF facility. The studios and offices in Reading's Tower Hotel were furnished with two remotely controlled cameras. In addition, WHUM-TV had the use of two satellite studios in Pomeroy's department stores at Wilkes-Barre and Harrisburg. The high-power facility was effective at sending signal over a wide area. However, signal strength was often not as high in Reading proper, leading to poorer pictures. Dealers often struggled to install television sets and antennas that received satisfactory signals from channel 61, particularly in Reading; they also learned that terrain shielding was much more severe to UHF signals than VHF.

You talk about a low-budget operation, HUM was a no-budget operation.

— Mary Ann Chelius Smith, WHUM-TV program host

In addition to CBS programming, WHUM-TV presented 30 hours of local and live programming a week. However, some of it was rather cheap: the station's cooking program was hosted by a woman who did not know how to cook and relied on cookbooks at the local public library to prepare her show. Additionally, the station aired sports programming from WPIX New York, part of a regional daisy-chain hookup of 10 stations. Six months after signing on, the station almost faced calamity when a small plane clipped one of the guy wires supporting the WHUM-TV tower. After striking the wire, the plane crashed and burst into flames; both occupants died.

A second outlet joined WHUM-TV two months later, when WEEU-TV (channel 33) began telecasting with NBC and ABC programs. WEEU-TV closed on June 30, 1955; WHUM-TV began airing some ABC programming after channel 33 folded.

== Closure ==
As more viewers tuned to the more powerful VHF signals of Philadelphia's network stations, channel 61 suffered. A financial reorganization of Eastern Radio Corporation was carried out early in 1956, with founder Greig ceding the job of general manager to Robert C. Magee. In late August, the specter of additional competition arose when the commission approved a proposal to return WLBR-TV, channel 15 at Lebanon, to the air, under the ownership of Triangle Publications; WHUM-TV had joined three UHF outlets in the Harrisburg area in protesting the transaction.

The final blow, however, came not from economic troubles, but from above. On the afternoon of September 4, 1956, a lightning bolt struck the WHUM-TV tower and caused what was described as "extensive" damage to the waveguide and antenna; two days later, channel 61 announced its closure would be for good. The station announced it would retain the construction permit but sell off the equipment to meet financial obligations. VHF service was maintained by five stations in the former WHUM-TV coverage area.

The large mast remained in place until 1958, when it was dismantled after being declared a "menace to aviation".
