= WDPN-TV =

Television station in Wilmington, Delaware

- Wilmington, Delaware; Philadelphia, Pennsylvania; United States
- City: Wilmington, Delaware (Note: Originally licensed to Jackson, Wyoming; moved to Delaware in 2013.)
- Channels: Digital: 2 (VHF); Virtual: 2
- Branding: MeTV 2; WDPN 2; MeTV 2 Wilmington/Philadelphia

Programming
- Affiliations: 2.1: MeTV; for others, see § Subchannels

Ownership
- Owner: Maranatha Broadcasting Company, Inc.
- Sister stations: WFMZ-TV

History
- Founded: June 3, 1988
- First air date: January 9, 1991
- Former call signs: Jackson, WY: KJVI (1991–1996), KJWY (1996–2013); Wilmington, DE: KJWP (2013–2018)
- Former channel number: Analog: 2 (VHF, 1991–2009)
- Former affiliations: ABC (via KPVI, 1991–1996); NBC (via KPVI, 1996–2009); This TV (2009–2012)
- Call sign meaning: Wilmington, Delaware, Pennsylvania, New Jersey

Technical information
- Licensing authority: FCC
- Facility ID: 1283
- ERP: 45 kW
- HAAT: 310.8 m (1,020 ft)
- Transmitter coordinates: 40°2′30.1″N 75°14′10.1″W
- Translator(s): WFMZ-DT 69.3 (9 VHF) Allentown; WFMZ-DRT 2.1 (24 UHF) Allentown; W24CS-D 2.1 (24 UHF) Reading

Links
- Public license information: Public file; LMS
- Website: metv2.com

WDPN-TV (channel 2) is a television station licensed to Wilmington, Delaware, United States, serving the Philadelphia television market as an affiliate of the classic television network MeTV. It is owned by Maranatha Broadcasting Company alongside Allentown, Pennsylvania–licensed WFMZ-TV (channel 69), an independent station. The two stations share studios on East Rock Road on South Mountain in Allentown; WDPN's transmitter is located in the Roxborough section of Philadelphia.

== History ==
WDPN-TV's origins lie in a construction permit granted to Ambassador Media in 1988 for a Jackson, Wyoming, satellite station of its ABC affiliate in Pocatello, Idaho, KPVI. The new station, which signed on January 9, 1991, as KJVI, served as a semi-satellite of KPVI for the Wyoming side of the Idaho Falls–Pocatello market, airing separate commercials. KPVI and KJVI were sold to Sunbelt Communications Company in November 1995, who switched the stations to NBC in January 1996. Channel 2's call letters were changed to KJWY that June. While KJWY was technically a satellite of KPVI, it later began to carry Wyoming news from another Sunbelt-owned NBC affiliate, KCWY in Casper, after that station began a news operation.

KJWY had the distinction of being the lowest-powered full-service analog television station in the United States, at only 178 watts. It also tied CJBN-TV (channel 13) of Kenora, Ontario, Canada, also at 178 watts, for the lowest-powered full-service analog station in North America. The analog channel 2 signal traveled a very long distance under normal conditions, and KJWY had to operate at very low power since it was short-spaced to KBCI-TV in Boise, Idaho (now KBOI-TV), and KUTV in Salt Lake City, Utah. After the digital transition was complete, KJWY's power was increased to 270 watts, equivalent to 1,350 watts in analog—still fairly modest for a full-power station.

Last logo as KJWY, 2012-2013

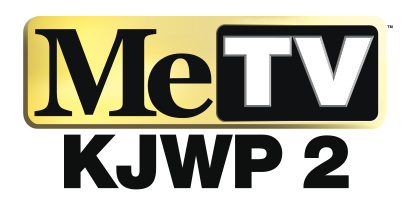
KJWP logo, 2013-2014

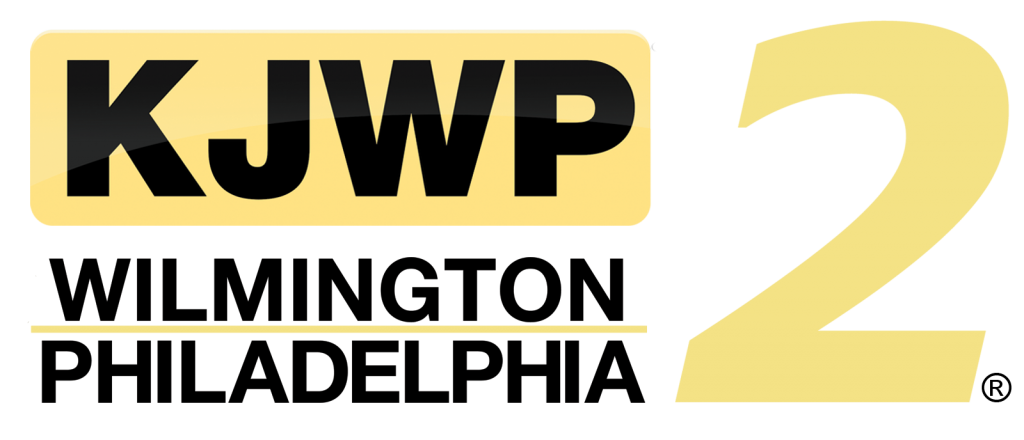
Last logo as KJWP, used until 2018

On March 2, 2009, Sunbelt Communications Company filed an application with the FCC to sell KJWY to PMCM TV (whose principals own six Jersey Shore radio stations in Monmouth and Ocean counties as Press Communications, LLC); however, Sunbelt initially planned to retain control of KJWY under a local marketing agreement. The transaction was approved by the FCC on June 10, 2009, after both parties agreed to drop the proposed local marketing agreement. After closing the sale on June 12, 2009, KJWY dropped all NBC programming, as well as the KPVI simulcast. After two months off-the-air, KJWY returned on August 12 as a This TV affiliate. It switched to MeTV in 2012.

=== Move to Delaware ===
Soon after taking over, PMCM sought permission to reallocate KJWY from Jackson, Wyoming, to Wilmington, Delaware, as part of a legal loophole that allows any VHF station that moves to a state with no FCC-licensed commercial VHF stations to receive automatic permission to move. Delaware had not had any commercial VHF stations licensed within its borders since WVUE in Wilmington—whose frequency is now occupied by Philadelphia PBS member WHYY-TV—had gone off the air in 1958. (PMCM also looked to move KVNV to New Jersey under the same rule.) The request was denied by the FCC in a December 18, 2009, letter. The full Commission denied PMCM's application for review in a Memorandum Opinion and Order released on September 15, 2011; however, this denial was reversed by the U.S. Court of Appeals for the D.C. Circuit on December 14, 2012. On March 8, 2013, the call letters were changed to KJWP, making it one of the few stations east of the Mississippi River with a "K" call sign. KJWP applied for a construction permit to move to Wilmington (though its transmitter is in Philadelphia's Roxborough neighborhood where the transmitters for most Philadelphia television stations are located) on May 28, 2013. KJWP signed off from Jackson for the last time on August 11, 2013, in anticipation of the move. (Following the move, the station's former studios on West Broadway in Jackson were permanently closed.)

On November 18, 2013, KJWP signed on its upconverted 720p high-definition television signal from its new location at Roxborough. The station continued to carry MeTV following the move, and on February 27, 2014, KJWP launched in the Philadelphia and New Jersey area. On March 1, 2014, KJWP fully became the Delaware Valley's exclusive MeTV affiliate, with Allentown-based WFMZ-TV discontinuing their MeTV subchannel the same day. After the move to Wilmington, the station's power drastically increased to 9.36 kW, adjusting itself to the size of the Philadelphia television market.

In late June 2014, the station announced the hiring of longtime Philadelphia television personality Larry Mendte as public affairs director. Mendte hosted two programs for the station; The Delaware Way, a week-in-review rundown of state issues, and ...And Another Thing, a more general news and commentary program (the latter also airs on sister station WJLP in the New York City area).

On December 17, 2015, PMCM TV agreed to sell KJWP to Allentown-based Maranatha Broadcasting Company (owner of WFMZ-TV) for an undisclosed price. The deal was finalized nearly two years later, on August 31, 2017, creating a duopoly in the Philadelphia market with WFMZ, with the two stations serving different parts of the market.

On September 4, 2018, KJWP's call letters were changed to WDPN-TV.

== Programming ==
As of January 2026, WDPN carries the majority of the MeTV lineup, with some exceptions. The 302, a public affairs show focused on the Delaware area, airs on Saturdays at 5:30 a.m. and Sundays at 7:30 a.m. WDPN also preempts the 6 a.m. hour on weekday mornings to air Last Man Standing and several hours of the MeTV schedule on early weekend mornings to air infomercials from 5 to 7 a.m. on Saturdays, and 6 to 8 a.m. on Sundays.

== Technical information ==
=== Subchannels ===
WDPN-TV's broadcast signal is multiplexed, with its lead channel (2.1) airing programming from MeTV. On August 18, 2014, KJWP added subchannels that carry Escape (2.2) and Grit (2.3), new networks that respectively cater to female and male audiences. In February 2015, Justice Network (2.4) made its debut as part of the KJWP broadcast featuring true crime and police-centric programming (Justice has since moved to a subchannel of Univision-owned WUVP-DT).

Subchannels of WDPN-TV
Subchannel	Res.	Short name	Programming
2.1	720p	2-MeTV	MeTV
2.2	480i	2-COURT	Court TV
2.3	480i	2MYSTRY	Ion Mystery
2.4	480i	2-H&I	Heroes & Icons
2.5	480i	2-RTV	Retro TV
2.6	480i	2CATCHY	Catchy Comedy
2.7	480i	2-STORY	Story Television
2.8	480i	2-PTN	Pocono Television Network
2.9	480i	2-NWMX2	Newsmax2
2.10	480i	2MeToon	MeTV Toons
2.11	480i	FUTURE1	69News Weather Channel (WFMZ-TV)

Simulcast of subchannels of another station
