= WLEV-TV =

Television station in Bethlehem, Pennsylvania (1953–1957)

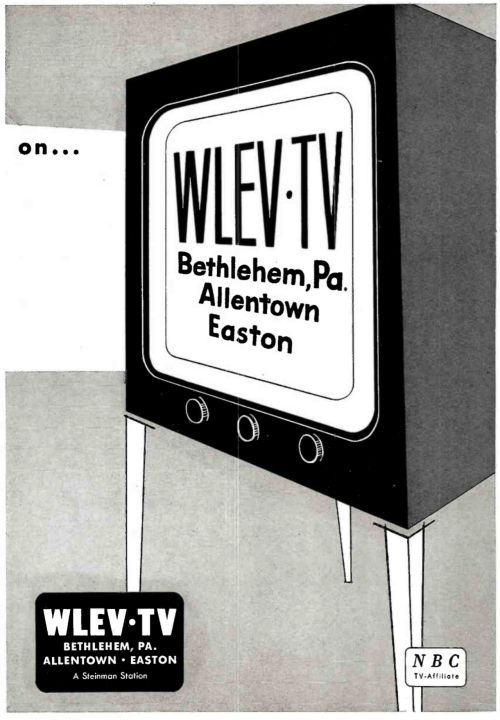
- WLEV-TV promo card
- Bethlehem, Pennsylvania; United States
- Channels: Analog: 51 (UHF)

Programming
- Affiliations: NBC (1953−1957)

Ownership
- Owner: Steinman / Associated Broadcasters Inc.
- Sister stations: WEST

History
- First air date: April 21, 1953
- Last air date: October 31, 1957
- Call sign meaning: Lehigh Valley

Technical information
- ERP: 7.41 kW
- HAAT: 600 ft (180 m)
- Transmitter coordinates: 40°35′55″N 75°25′12″W

WLEV-TV (channel 51) was a television station in Bethlehem, Pennsylvania, United States. Owned by Associated Broadcasters Inc. alongside WEST, the station telecast from 1953 to 1957. It was the first station in the Lehigh Valley, which at one point had three local UHF outlets (a fourth was planned but never reached the air). However, the station ultimately suffered from many of the same economic problems that occurred at other early UHF television outlets, and largely due to competition from very high frequency (VHF) stations in Philadelphia, WLEV left the air at the end of October 1957.

== History ==
=== Establishment ===
When the Federal Communications Commission (FCC) ended its four-year freeze on television stations in 1952 and established the UHF band for television broadcasting, the Lehigh Valley received four channel allotments: two in Allentown, one in Bethlehem, and one in Easton. The commission issued a construction permit for the Bethlehem station on October 30, 1952.

RCA announced that it would ship the transmitter for the WLEV-TV facility the week of April 13, 1953. It was reported that "after many false starts" WLEV finally began broadcasting test patterns on April 21.

=== Operation ===
WLEV was, from its beginning, an NBC affiliate and offered most, if not all, of that network's late afternoon and evening programming. The station also carried local programming (as did every other station during this era), including local high school and college sports and the occasional Philadelphia Phillies baseball game. The station would take to the airwaves in midafternoon, with the first scheduled show of the day typically beginning at 3 p.m. A short local newscast was aired in the 11 p.m. to midnight hour.

=== Closure ===
The lack of mandatory UHF tuners on new television sets (until 1964) made it difficult for 1950s UHF stations to thrive. In much of eastern Pennsylvania, improvements in VHF transmitter technology and power, plus the establishment of tall towers at the Roxborough antenna farm, spelled doom for the UHF stations in Reading and the Lehigh Valley as more viewers tuned to the more powerful—and VHF—signals of Philadelphia's network stations from which they could now get better reception (and thus better pictures) on their TV sets.

October 31, 1957, marked the end of an era in Lehigh Valley television. Within 24 hours of each other, ABC affiliate WGLV in Easton and WLEV both received permission to go dark, and both did so on the same night. WLEV announced that it was planning to go dark for six months "to reappraise UHF television in the Lehigh Valley" but stayed dark beyond those six months and never returned to the airwaves. The station returned its construction permit to the FCC in 1965.
