= WLMB =

Television station in Toledo, Ohio

- Toledo, Ohio; United States
- Channels: Digital: 35 (UHF); Virtual: 40

Programming
- Affiliations: 40.1: Religious Independent; for others, see § Subchannels

Ownership
- Owner: Dominion Broadcasting, Inc.

History
- Founded: July 17, 1992
- First air date: October 18, 1998
- Former channel numbers: Analog: 40 (UHF, 1998–2009); Digital: 5 (VHF, until 2024)
- Former affiliations: Pax TV/i (per program, 2000–2006); FamilyNet; Worship
- Call sign meaning: Lamb (of God)

Technical information
- Licensing authority: FCC
- Facility ID: 17076
- ERP: 375 kW
- HAAT: 168 m (551 ft)
- Transmitter coordinates: 41°44′41″N 84°1′6″W

Links
- Public license information: Public file; LMS
- Website: www.wlmb.com

WLMB (channel 40) is a religious independent television station in Toledo, Ohio, United States, owned by Dominion Broadcasting. The station's studios are located on Capital Commons Drive in Toledo, and its transmitter is located in Jasper, Michigan.

== History ==
The station's first call sign was issued as WXAE-TV on July 17, 1992. It adopted its current call sign on May 17, 1994. However, the station did not commence broadcasting until October 18, 1998.

WLMB was an affiliate of Pax TV/i from 2000 to 2006, but the station only carried selected original and religious programming.

On October 2, 2024, WLMB moved its signal from VHF channel 5 to UHF channel 35.

== Programming ==
WLMB's lineup features religious programming in the mornings and early afternoons, classic TV series in the late afternoons and early evenings, more religious shows during prime time, overnights and all day on Sunday, children's shows on Saturday mornings and infomercials on Saturday afternoons.

=== Radiant TV ===
Radiant TV is the brand for WLMB's second digital subchannel, consisting of nature scenes set to Christian music in a format similar to the now-defunct Worship Network. WLMB syndicates Radiant TV to other Christian television networks, making it available nationwide.

== Subchannels ==
The station's signal is multiplexed:

Subchannels of WLMB
Subchannel	Res.	Short name	Programming
40.1	1080i	WLMBDT	Main WLMB programming
40.2	1080i	WLMBDT2	RadiantTV
40.3	480i	WLMB+	Additional religious programming
40.4	480i	WLMBkid	Children's programming
40.5	480i	WLMBshw	Classic secular programming
40.6	480i	COACB	TCT (WOCB-CD)

Simulcast of subchannels of another station
