= WFMZ-TV =

Television station in Allentown, Pennsylvania

- Allentown–Philadelphia, Pennsylvania; United States
- City: Allentown, Pennsylvania
- Channels: Digital: 9 (VHF), shared with WLVT-TV, WBPH-TV and WPPT; Virtual: 69
- Branding: WFMZ-TV 69

Programming
- Affiliations: 69.1: Independent; for others, see § Subchannels

Ownership
- Owner: Maranatha Broadcasting Company, Inc.
- Sister stations: WDPN-TV

History
- First air date: November 25, 1976
- Former channel numbers: Analog: 69 (UHF, 1976–2009); Digital: 46 (UHF, 1998–2018)
- Call sign meaning: Family Minded Zone

Technical information
- Licensing authority: FCC
- Facility ID: 39884
- ERP: 80.6 kW
- HAAT: 332.5 m (1,091 ft)
- Transmitter coordinates: 40°33′52″N 75°26′24″W
- Translator(s): 7 (VHF) Philadelphia; 24 (UHF) Allentown; W24CS-D Reading; 27 (UHF) Boyertown

Links
- Public license information: Public file; LMS
- Website: www.wfmz.com

WFMZ-TV (channel 69) is an independent television station in Allentown, Pennsylvania, United States. It is owned by locally based Maranatha Broadcasting Company alongside Wilmington, Delaware–licensed MeTV affiliate WDPN-TV (channel 2). The two stations share studios on East Rock Road on South Mountain in Allentown, where WFMZ-TV's transmitter is located. WFMZ-TV also maintains a secondary studio in the PPL Center sports arena in Center City Allentown and a newsroom on Court Street in Reading.

== History ==
=== Channel 67 ===
Prior to the debut of channel 69, an earlier television station that held the WFMZ-TV call sign and was based in Allentown operated on UHF channel 67 from December 1954 until April 1955. Like the current WFMZ-TV, it was co-owned with WFMZ radio (100.7 MHz). The radio station was sold twice in the 21-year gap between the two television stations.

=== Channel 69 ===
In February 1975, WFMZ reapplied for a television station license with channel 69 having been substituted for channel 67 in Allentown. The application was approved on December 9, 1975. Studios and a transmitter were co-sited with WFMZ radio. The channel 69 transmitter and much of the equipment came from the short-lived WHFV in Fredericksburg, Virginia, which had ended operations in May 1975.

WFMZ-TV made its debut on November 25, 1976. Its programming consisted primarily of family-oriented entertainment shows, operating 13 hours a day. The FM radio station remained co-owned until it was sold in 1997.

In the 1990s, WFMZ began running fewer religious shows and more sitcoms, talk shows and reality shows. The station's news department, 69 News, was also gradually expanded. By 2000, the station was running three hours of local Lehigh Valley news a day and a mix of comedy shows and talk, reality television, and court show programming. The station presently airs about six hours a day of news in addition to talk and reality shows.

== Local programming ==
=== News ===
In 1976, the station's news department debuted with two daily newscasts at 7 and 10 p.m. daily, known as Newspulse. The news programs were later rebranded as Channel 69 News in the late 1980s and the station's news division gradually expanded. In 1989, WFMZ added a 5 p.m. newscast and in 1997, the 7 p.m. news show was moved up to 6 p.m.

In 1995, WFMZ expanded its news service geographically with the debut of its Berks Edition newscast at 5:30 p.m. In 1998, this program was expanded to include a 10:30 p.m. news broadcast. Both Berks Edition newscasts were established in response to a perception that the Allentown area was being covered more extensively than the Reading area by Philadelphia news stations. WFMZ originally used a small newsroom at the Reading Eagle newspaper for these broadcasts.

Beginning in 1997, WFMZ began experiencing significantly enhanced ratings for its news coverage of the Lehigh Valley. In the late 1990s, the station also launched its first Lehigh Valley-focused morning and noon news programs.

In 2003, the region's first Spanish language newscast, 69 News en Español, debuted to serve the growing Hispanic community in the Lehigh Valley and Berks County areas.

In 2005, WFMZ formed a broadcast partnership with WPVI-TV (channel 6), Philadelphia's ABC owned-and-operated station. The partnership permitted the two stations to cooperate in news gathering for local stories. In May 2008, WFMZ became the fourth television station in the Philadelphia media market to begin broadcasting its local newscasts in high definition.

In October 2014, WFMZ added an hour-long newscast at 4 p.m., making it the third station in the Philadelphia market (after WCAU and WPVI-TV) to broadcast local news in the timeslot. In February 2015, WFMZ debuted its new street-level studio inside the PPL Center sports arena in Center City Allentown. The station broadcasts its noon news program from its PPL Center studio.

On September 25, 2023, WFMZ debuted a new 30-minute long 8 p.m. newscast. Previously, there was a gap in news coverage from 6:30 p.m. until the 10 p.m. newscast.

=== Non-news programming ===
WFMZ produces local programs about business, sports and health-related topics, including:

- The American Law Journal is a call-in show that debuted in 1990, hosted by attorney Christopher Naughton, who is joined by various attorneys to answer questions about legal topics.
- Animal Doctor is hosted by 6 p.m. weather anchor Kathy Craine and features Lehigh Valley veterinarians discussing pet-related topics.
- The Big Ticket covers Lehigh Valley high school football highlights and airs every Friday at 11 p.m. in place of the Spanish-language Edición en Español newscast, which airs at 6:30 p.m. on WFMZ-DT4 during the high school football season. The show debuted in 1995 and is hosted by Jim Vaughn and Dan Moscaritolo with reports from WFMZ sports reporter Dave Lesko.
- Business Matters is a discussion program, hosted by Tony Iannelli, that features a panel of experts discussing various business issues.
- The Freddy Awards, modeled after the Tony Awards ceremony, debuted on WFMZ in 2003 and features a panel of evaluators who view and judge Lehigh Valley high school musical productions. The best of these high school productions are recognized in an annual ceremony broadcast live on WFMZ. Ed Hanna and Shelley Brown host the ceremony from the State Theatre in Easton.
- Lehigh Sports Magazine is a sports program on Lehigh University sports that debuted in 1994 and airs during the fall. It is hosted by Jim Vaughn and features interviews with Lehigh University coaches and players.
- Talk With Your Doctor is a call-in show featuring health-related issues. The show is hosted by Doug Eberhart, who is joined by a panel of physicians from St. Luke's University Health Network.
- The Peak features new medical innovations, nutritious recipes and related events. The show debuted September 30, 2012, and is hosted by Ashley Russo and Mike Mittman.
- WFMZ Documentary Unit is a partnership between WFMZ and Julian Farris Films to create documentaries on local Lehigh Valley events and people. The documentary unit has won Emmy nominations for several of its documentaries, including Boscov: An American Story, Time Bomb: Allentown Gas Explosion, and Aftershocks: Earthquake in Haiti. The documentary unit is headed up by 69 News reporter Jaccii Farris and includes WFMZ executive producer Amy Unger, both of whom also maintain affiliations with Julian Farris Films.
- Since 2008, WFMZ has served as the broadcaster for select Lehigh Valley IronPigs home games, primarily on Saturdays.

== Technical information ==
=== Subchannels ===
Subchannels of WBPH-TV, WPPT, WLVT-TV, and WFMZ-TV
License	Subchannel	Res.	Short name	Programming
WBPH-TV	60.1	720p	WBPH-D1	Lighthouse TV
WBPH-TV	60.2	480i	WBPH-D2	Radiant TV
WPPT	35.1	480i	39EXTRA	PBS
WLVT-TV	39.1	720p	WLVT-DT	PBS
WLVT-TV	39.3	480i	FRAN24	France 24
WFMZ-TV	69.1	720p	WFMZ-HD	Independent
WFMZ-TV	69.2	480i	WFMZ-WC	Local weather
WFMZ-TV	69.3	480i	WFMZ-ME	MeTV (WDPN-TV)

Simulcast of subchannels of another station

WFMZ offers three subchannels on a multiplex shared with WBPH-TV, WLVT-TV, and WPPT. One is the 69 News Weather Channel, a continuous loop of regional weather information, traffic cameras, and news headlines. 69 News Weather Channel launched February 5, 2001, and is the first such multicast service in the United States; unlike other AccuWeather affiliates, who generally used the Local AccuWeather Channel service that mixed nationally oriented segments produced by AccuWeather with local content, WFMZ's service has always been entirely local. Another subchannel offers a simulcast of WDPN-TV's MeTV channel.

=== Translators ===
The WBPH-WFMZ-WLVT-WPPT multiplex is broadcast on two digital replacement translators that improve reception in areas to the south of Allentown, including Philadelphia:

Location	Channel	ERP	HAAT	Transmitter coordinates
Boyertown	27	10 kW	110.8 m (364 ft)	40°19′03.0″N 75°38′59.0″W
Philadelphia	7	0.04 kW		40°2′33.0″N 75°14′32.0″W

A third digital replacement translator for WFMZ-TV on UHF channel 24 in Allentown, as well as separately licensed translator W24CS-D in Reading, offer a different mix of channels with two additional subchannels from WDPN-TV, but none from WBPH, WLVT, or WPPT.

Subchannels of WFMZ-TV (Allentown/Reading UHF)
Subchannel	Res.	Short name	Programming
69.1	720p	WFMZ-HD	Main WFMZ-TV programming
69.2	480i	WFMZ-WC	The 69 News Weather Channel
2.1	720p	2-MeTV	MeTV (WDPN-TV)
2.4	480i	2-H&I	Heroes & Icons (WDPN-TV)
2.6	480i	2-DECAD	Catchy Comedy (WDPN-TV)

In 2009, WFMZ began carrying Retro TV as a WFMZ subchannel. On January 24, 2014, however, MeTV announced that it would move its Philadelphia-market affiliation from WFMZ-TV's 69.3 subchannel to KJWP (channel 2, now WDPN-TV), which has carried MeTV programming in addition to the WFMZ subchannel since November 2013. In April 2014, Atlanta-based Tuff TV officially replaced MeTV on the 69.3 subchannel; in December 2014, the signal began carrying the Heroes & Icons network feed. On October 1, 2019, WFMZ re-added MeTV as a simulcast of WDPN-TV on the 69.3 subchannel; H&I is still seen in the market on WDPN's fourth subchannel.

=== Analog-to-digital conversion ===
WFMZ-TV shut down its analog signal over UHF channel 69 on June 12, 2009, the official date on which full-power television stations in the United States transitioned from analog to digital broadcasts under federal regulations. WFMZ's digital signal continued broadcasting its pre-transition UHF channel 46, using virtual channel 69.

WFMZ's standalone signal was sold in the 2016 broadcast incentive auction. It entered into a channel-sharing agreement with WBPH-TV. To relieve any congestion related to the channel sharing, some of WFMZ's subchannels moved to KJWP, which WFMZ purchased in a separate transaction with the proceeds from the spectrum sale.

== See also ==
- Media in the Lehigh Valley
