= South Mountain (Eastern Pennsylvania) =

Range of the Appalachian Mountains

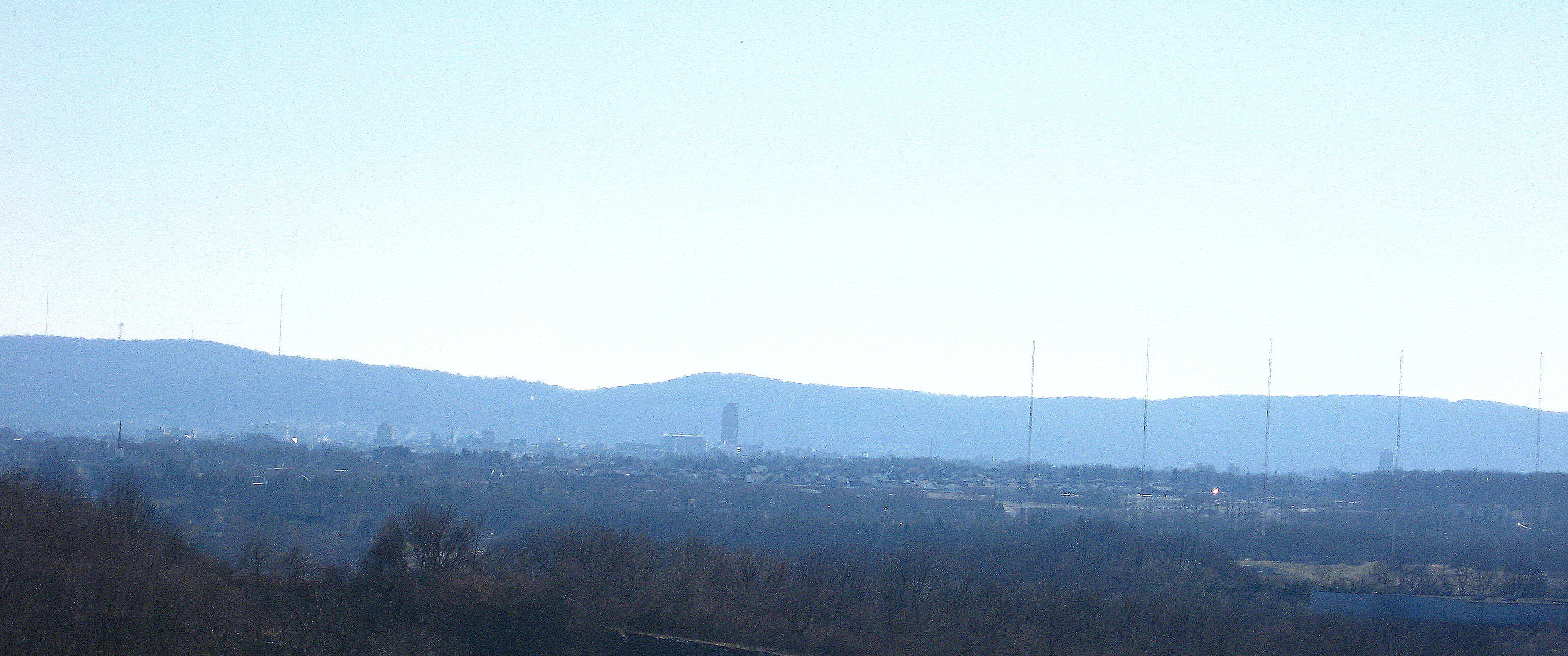
- South Mountain (background) seen from Egypt, Pennsylvania with Allentown (foreground) in December 2010

Highest point
- Peak: Womelsdorf Benchmark
- Elevation: 1,380 ft (420 m)
- Coordinates: 40°19′28″N 76°11′44″W

Geography
- Country: United States
- State: Pennsylvania
- Region: New England province
- Counties: Berks, Lancaster, Lebanon, Northampton and Lehigh
- Parent range: Appalachian Highlands
- Borders on: Lebanon Valley, Lehigh Valley and Piedmont
- Biome: Ridge-and-Valley Appalachians

Geology
- Orogeny: Grenville orogeny
- Rock ages: Proterozoic eon and about 570 to 1,600 million years ago
- Rock types: Crystalline metamorphic rock and gneiss

South Mountain is a colloquial name applied to an Appalachian Mountain range extending north and northeast along the south side of Lebanon Valley to the Lehigh Valley region of eastern Pennsylvania. South Mountain includes the southernmost cluster of peaks that straddle Berks, Lancaster, and Lebanon counties and the northernmost end of the ridge on which Lehigh University is built, in Bethlehem in the Lehigh Valley.

The mountain borders Emmaus just south of Allentown and comprises a ridge of low mountains passing east of Reading, and then extends due west. South Mountain is a continuation of the New England Province and is the southern end of the Hudson Highlands. The mountain is a core geographic feature throughout much of the Pennsylvania side of the Lehigh Valley. The mountain is called the Reading Prong by geologists.

Unlike Blue Mountain to its north, South Mountain does not follow a straight geographic line. The mountain ranges in elevation between 500 and 1,300 feet (150 and 400 m) above sea level. The ridge is made of metamorphic rocks and gneiss, which date to the Precambrian era and range from about 570 million to 1,600 million years old.

South Mountain is largely undeveloped in its northern extension due to conservation efforts and the mountain's steep slope. This makes it a beautiful backdrop to the viewpoints of the Lehigh Valley, including, at night, the city lights of Allentown. The southern end of the mountain extends west along U.S. Route 422 and the southeastern border of Berks County, providing views of Blue Mountain to the north, and Mount Penn, which comprises part of the prong and the city of Reading to the east.

The southernmost peaks were at one time home to many exclusive sanitariums and resorts, now all defunct except for the Caron Foundation. South Mountain serves as the transmitter site for several local radio and television stations, including the independent television station WFMZ-TV, which maintains both its transmitter and studio facilities on the mountain, south of Allentown.
