= WHOL =

Radio station in Allentown, Pennsylvania

Simulcast of WEST
- Allentown, Pennsylvania; United States
- Broadcast area: Lehigh Valley
- Frequency: 1600 kHz
- Branding: Loud 106.9/99.5

Programming
- Format: Rhythmic contemporary

Ownership
- Owner: Major Keystone LLC
- Sister stations: WEST

History
- First air date: September 12, 1948
- Former frequencies: 1230 kHz (1948–1955)
- Call sign meaning: "Hola" (former branding; means "hello" in Spanish)

Technical information
- Licensing authority: FCC
- Facility ID: 36987
- Class: D
- Power: 1,000 watts day 56 watts night
- Transmitter coordinates: 40°35′33.4″N 75°28′40.7″W
- Translators: 93.7 W229AO (Fogelsville); 106.9 W295CR (Allentown)

Links
- Public license information: Public file; LMS
- Webcast: Listen live
- Website: loud1069.com

WHOL (1600 AM) is a rhythmic contemporary radio station in Allentown, Pennsylvania. The station is owned by Major Keystone LLC. It is simulcast with co-owned WEST (1400 AM) in Easton, Pennsylvania. The studios and transmitter are on Colorado Street in Allentown.

WHOL is powered at 1,000 watts by day. To protect other stations on 1600 AM, it reduces power to 56 watts at night. It uses a directional antenna at all times. Programming is also heard on 99 watt FM translator W295CR at 106.9 MHz.

== History ==
WHOL signed on the air at 1230 AM, on September 5, 1948, with a test program. The station began regular programming on September 12. It was an affiliate of the CBS Radio Network, bringing CBS programming to the Allentown area, including dramas, comedies, news, sports, soap operas, game shows and big band broadcasts during the "Golden Age of Radio".

Founded by the Allentown Broadcasting Corporation, the station was granted its construction permit in 1946. A suit was immediately brought by a competing applicant, Easton Publishing Co., owner of the daily Easton Express newspaper, charging that the Federal Communications Commission (FCC) erred in granting a fourth license to Allentown while Easton had only one radio frequency. The FCC reversed its decision in favor of the newspaper. The case eventually reached the U.S. Supreme Court, which in 1955 ruled the FCC had acted properly. The Express was subsequently awarded the 1230 AM frequency for a new full-time station, WEEX, while WHOL moved to 1600 AM as a daytime only operation. Currently, WHOL operates full-time with reduced wattage at night.

For much of the 2000s and 2010s, WHOL aired a Spanish language tropical music format simulcast with 1400 WEST Easton. During 2014, WHOL changed its image from "Hola Radio" to "La Ola Radio" and added a translator, W258BM, that allows the station to also be heard on FM radio at 99.5. On January 1, 2017, at the stroke of Midnight, WHOL, WEST, and W258BM rebranded as "Mega 99.5".

On October 19, 2020, WHOL split from its simulcast with WEST and changed its format to syndicated conservative talk, branded as "106.9 The Talk". On January 5, 2021, WHOL dropped the conservative talk format after nearly three months and began stunting with a heartbeat, interspersed with a voice saying "It's coming! It's almost here! Very soon!". The next day, WHOL flipped to a rhythmic contemporary format as "Loud 106.9/99.5", once again simulcasting WEST.

The station, along with WEST and translators W258DV and W295CR, was sold to Major Keystone LLC on January 17, 2022, in exchange for the licenses to WGLD, WTKZ, and W296EA. Major Keystone had been programming WHOL and WEST since the launch of the "Loud" format. The swap was consummated on March 31, 2022.

== See also ==
- Media in the Lehigh Valley
