= WRNJ =

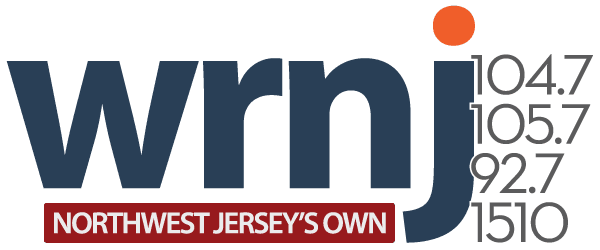
- Hackettstown, New Jersey; United States
- Frequency: 1510 kHz

Programming
- Format: Adult contemporary
- Affiliations: ABC News Radio

Ownership
- Owner: WRNJ Radio, Inc. (Larry Tighe and Norman Worth)

History
- First air date: August 26, 1976
- Former frequencies: 1000 kHz (1976–1996)
- Call sign meaning: Radio North Jersey

Technical information
- Licensing authority: FCC
- Facility ID: 76913
- Class: B
- Power: 2,000 watts day; 1,100 watts critical hours; 230 watts night
- Transmitter coordinates: 40°49′0.5″N 74°49′36.7″W
- Translators: 92.7 W224AS (Washington); 104.7 W284AQ (Hackettstown); 105.7 W289CR (Glen Gardner)

Links
- Public license information: Public file; LMS
- Webcast: Listen live
- Website: wrnjradio.com

WRNJ (1510 AM) is a commercial radio station in Hackettstown, New Jersey. It broadcasts an adult contemporary radio format and is owned locally by WRNJ Radio, Inc. The studios and offices are on U.S. Route 46 in Hackettstown.

By day, WRNJ is powered at 2,000 watts. Because AM 1510 is a clear channel frequency reserved for Class A station WLAC in Nashville, WRNJ must reduce power at night to 230 watts. Programming is also heard on FM translators on 92.7, 104.7 and 105.7 MHz.

== History ==
=== AM 1000 in Dover ===
WRNJ began operation on AM 1000 on August 26, 1976. It was a daytime only station with no pre-sunrise or post-sunset authorization, except for local emergencies. The original city of license was Dover, New Jersey. WRNJ employed a full-service adult contemporary format with an emphasis on local news, with national news supplied by the Mutual Broadcasting System. WRNJ also had local talk shows featuring local leaders and volunteers. Larry Tighe originally owned the radio station.

For many years WRNJ was not profitable. By the early 1980s, there were rumors that the station may even go dark. At that point, Norman Worth, who was the only person selling a substantial amount of advertising, became sales manager. Months later the station began turning a profit. By the late 1980s, Worth became part owner of the station and took over as General Manager and eventually as Chief Operating Officer.

=== Move to 1510 Hacketstown ===
In 1992, Worth was awarded an FM license on 107.1 FM. That station became WRNJ-FM and aired a country music format. In 1996, WRNJ was given permission to move to 1510 kHz. Westinghouse Broadcasting wanted to remove WRNJ from its AM 1000 home because it planned to improve the signal of its New York City AM station, WINS at 1010 kHz. That year, WRNJ moved from AM 1000 to 1510. It kept its full service adult contemporary format initially, and began operating from 5 a.m. to 10 p.m. daily.

In 1997, engineers determined that the station's towers could not transmit the correct nighttime patterns. WRNJ reverted to daytime-only operation. The current music also was phased out and the station evolved to more of an oldies format. By 1998, it was known as "Oldies 1510 WRNJ". The station still continued to be profitable despite the daytime-only operation. At the same time, management sold the FM station at 107.1 MHz to Big City Radio. Today the FM station is WWYY, licensed to Belvidere but broadcasting from Stroudsburg. It simulcasts country station WCTO in Easton, Pennsylvania.

=== 24 hour operation ===
In 1999, Oldies 1510 WRNJ began a 24 hour schedule after fixing its tower pattern. It aired satellite-delivered oldies programming for much of the day, but retained its morning show, specialty shows, local news, and local talk shows. In 2004, WRNJ dropped satellite programming. It aired a full-service format that plays adult contemporary music with some talk shows also featured.

Logo before 105.7 translator sign on

The sale of WRNJ-FM in 1998 excluded the FM translators on 92.7 in Washington Township and on 104.7 in Hackettstown. WRNJ's owners retained these to rebroadcast the AM signal for listeners who prefer FM's sound quality. In 2009, the oldies sound evolved to a classic hits format focusing on 1970s and 1980s hits. In 2014, the station returned to a mix of adult contemporary and classic hits, with the slogan "Today's Hits and Yesterday's Favorites". The playlist is mostly from the 1980s, 1990s, and 2000s, but with a few titles from the 1960s and 1970s.

== FM translators ==
In addition to its main signal on 1510 AM, WRNJ broadcasts on the following FM translators:

Call sign	Frequency	City of license	FID	ERP (W)	Class	Transmitter coordinates	FCC info
W224AS	92.7 FM	Washington, New Jersey	54693	150	D	40°48′28″N 74°57′32″W	LMS
W284AQ	104.7 FM	Hackettstown, New Jersey	54698	250	D	40°51′19″N 74°46′42″W	LMS
W289CR	105.7 FM	Glen Gardner, New Jersey	202425	218	D	40°41′30.5″N 74°55′29.6″W	LMS

=== Notable former personalities ===
- Bernie Wagenblast
