= Mass media in the Lehigh Valley =

List of media outlets in Lehigh Valley, PA

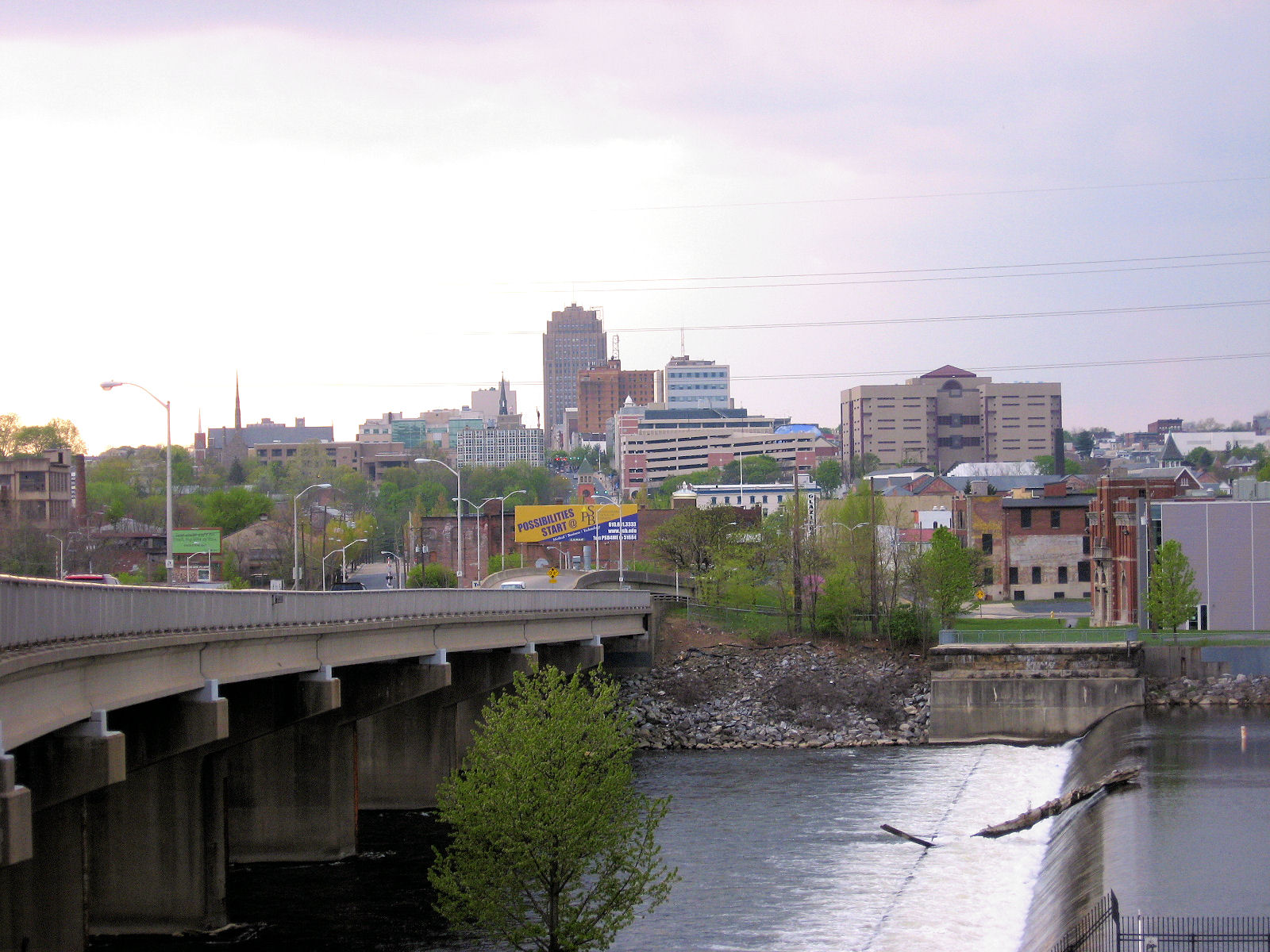
Allentown, the largest city in the Lehigh Valley, third-largest city in Pennsylvania, and county seat of Lehigh County in May 2010

This is a list of media in the Lehigh Valley region of eastern Pennsylvania:

== Magazines and newspapers ==
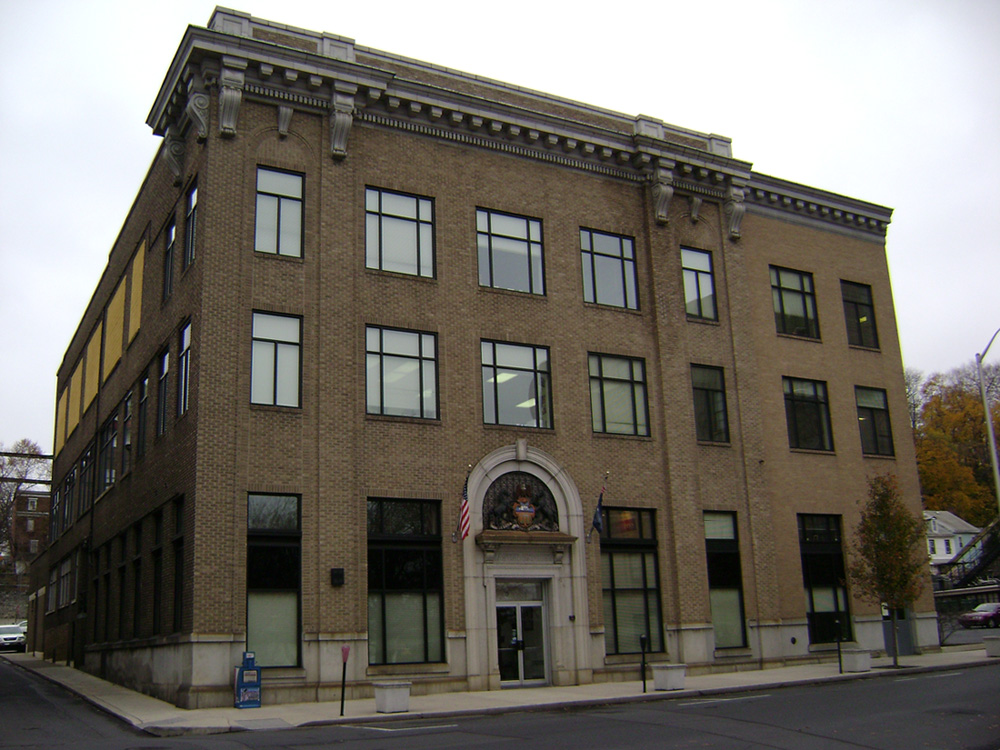
The Express-Times' headquarters in Easton in November 2009

Newspaper	Location	Founded	Type	Website
The Brown and White	Bethlehem	1894	College	thebrownandwhite.com
The Express-Times	Easton	1855	Daily	lehighvalleylive.com
The Lafayette	Easton	1870	College	lafayettestudentnews.com
Lehigh Valley Business	Bethlehem	1990	Financial, Weekly	lvb.com
Lehigh Valley Style	Easton	2000	Monthly	lehighvalleystyle.com
Lifestyles over 50	Allentown	2006	Quarterly	lifestylesover50.com
The Morning Call	Allentown	1883	Daily	mcall.com
Muhlenberg Weekly	Allentown	1883	College, weekly	muhlenbergweekly.com
Pork Illustrated: The Official IronPigs Game Day Program	Allentown	2008	Sports	Pork Illustrated
Times News	Lehighton	1883	Daily	tnonline.com

== Television stations ==
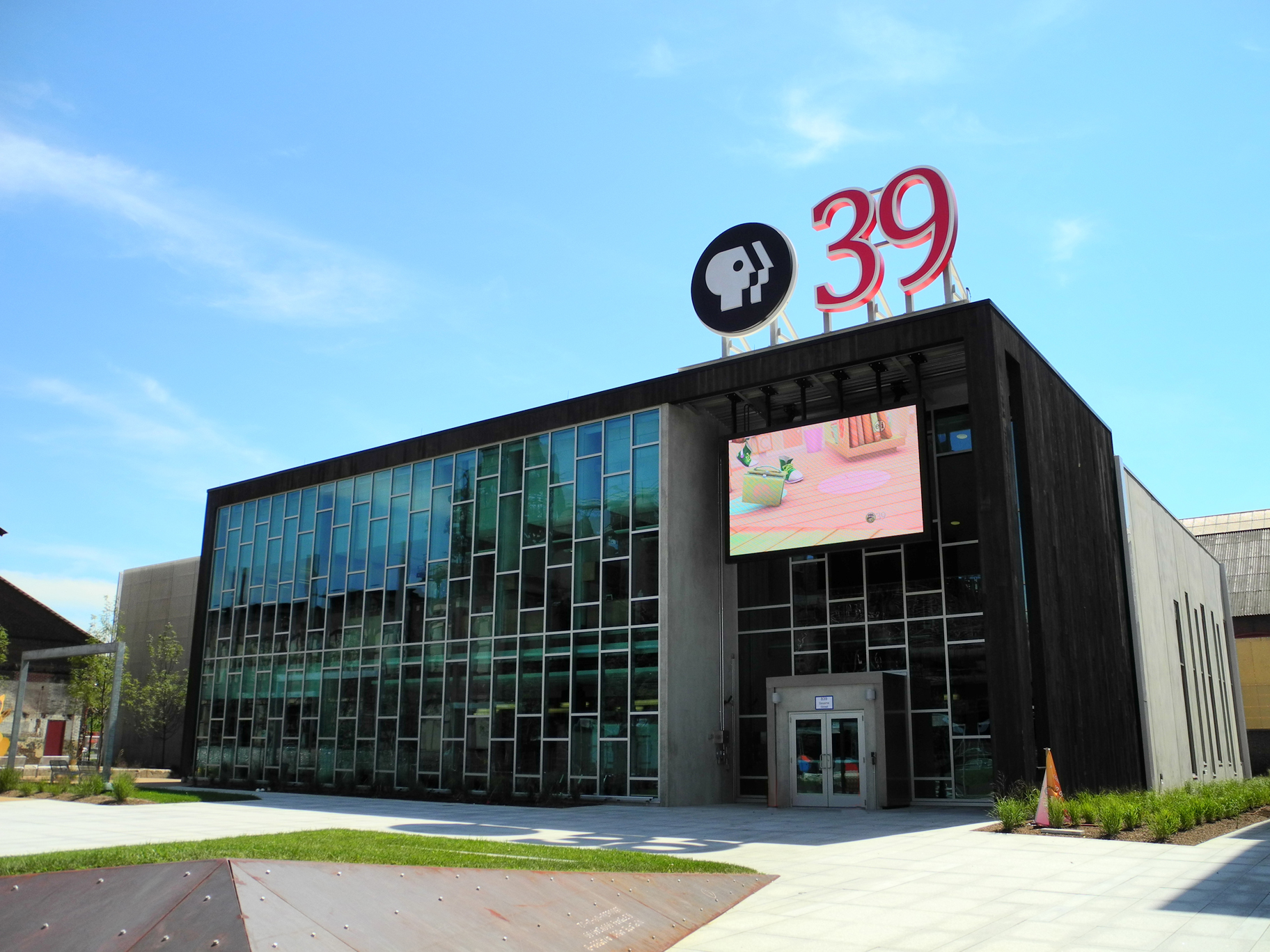
WLVT-TV, the Lehigh Valley's PBS affiliate based in Bethlehem, began broadcasting in 1965.

Television station	Location	Affiliate	Founded	Website
WBPH-TV	Allentown	Independent station	1990	wbph.org
WFMZ-TV*	Allentown	Independent station	1976	wfmz.com
WLVT-TV	Bethlehem	PBS	1965	wlvt.org

The Lehigh Valley is also part of the Philadelphia television market. Philadelphia stations are available over-the-air and on cable.

* A WFMZ-TV went on the air in December 1954 on analog UHF channel 67. It went dark in April 1955.

== AM radio stations ==
AM radio station	Frequency (kHz)	Format	Founded	Website
WAEB	790	News	1949	waeb.com
WGPA	1100	Ameripolitan	1946	wgpasunny1100.com
WEEX	1230	Sports		espnlv.com
WTKZ	1320	Sports	1948*	espnlv.com
WEST	1400	Rhythmic Contemporary		loudradiopa.com
WSAN	1470	Talk/Podcast	1923**	podcastam1470.com
WHOL	1600	Rhythmic Contemporary	1948	loudradiopa.com

* As WKAP
** As WCBA (1070)

== FM radio stations ==
FM radio stations	Frequency (MHz)	Branding	Format	Founded	Website
WDIY	88.1	WDIY	Public Radio	1995	wdiy.org
WJCS	89.3	WJCS 89.3	Religious		wjcs.org
WLHI	90.3	The Word FM	Religious	1983*	wordfm.org
WLVR-FM	91.3	91.3 WLVR	Public Radio	1946	wlvr.org
WMUH	91.7	91.7 WMUH	College	1950	muhlenberg.edu/wmuh
WZZO	95.1	95-1 ZZO	Active Rock	1977	wzzo.com
WCTO	96.1	Cat Country 96 & 107	Country	1947	catcountry96.com
WEST	99.5	Loud Radio 106.9/99.5	Rhythmic Contemporary	1936	loudradiopa.com
WODE-FM	99.9	99-9 The Hawk	Classic Rock	1948	999thehawk.com
WLEV	100.7	WLEV	Adult Contemporary	1947**	wlevradio.com
WAEB-FM	104.1	B104	Top 40/CHR	1961	b104.com
WJRH	104.9	WJRH-FM	College	1946	wjrh.org
WHOL	106.9	Loud Radio 106.9/99.5	Rhythmic Contemporary	1948	loudradiopa.com
WWYY	107.1	Cat Country 96 & 107	Country	1992***	catcountry96.com

* As WXLV (1983 - 2013)
** As WFMZ
*** As WRNJ-FM (1992–1998)

== Internet ==
Site	Type	URL	Location
BioCycle	The Organics Recycling Authority	BioCycle	Emmaus
DeSales University student radio	College Internet radio	WDSR Campus Radio	Center Valley
Fig Lehigh Valley	Local shopping, dining, news, and entertainment	Fig Lehigh Valley	Bethlehem
LehighValleyLive.com	News	LehighValleyLive.com	Easton
Lehigh Valley News	News	lehighvalleynews.com	Bethlehem
Lehigh Valley Press News	Information, news, events	Lehigh Valley Press News	Allentown
Lehigh Valley Voice	Local news	Lehigh Valley Voice	Easton
The Saucon Source	Hyperlocal	sauconsource.com	Hellertown
The Home News	Local news	The Home News	Northampton County
The Valley Ledger	Information, news, events	thevalleyledger.com	Lehigh Valley
WAEB (AM)	Talk radio	Newsradio 790 WAEB	Whitehall
WEST/WHOL	Rhythmic Contemporary	Lehigh Valley’s Hip Hop Station	Easton
WAEB-FM	CHR	B104: The Valley's #1 Hit Music Station	Whitehall
WCTO	Country music	Cat Country 96	Bethlehem
WDIY	Public radio	WDIY 88.1: Lehigh Valley Public Radio	Bethlehem
WLEV	Adult contemporary	100.7 LEV: Today's Best Music: The Lehigh Valley	Bethlehem
WSAN	Oldies	Real Oldies 1470: The Valley's 60s and 70s Hits	Bethlehem
WZZO	Classic rock	The Valley's Rock Station	Bethlehem
