= WEST (AM) =

- Easton, Pennsylvania; United States
- Broadcast area: Lehigh Valley
- Frequency: 1400 kHz
- Branding: Loud 106.9/99.5

Programming
- Format: Rhythmic contemporary

Ownership
- Owner: Major Keystone LLC
- Sister stations: WHOL

History
- First air date: 1923
- Former call signs: WDBC (1923–1926); WFJC (1926–1935)
- Call sign meaning: Easton

Technical information
- Licensing authority: FCC
- Facility ID: 36996
- Class: C
- Power: 1,000 watts
- Transmitter coordinates: 40°40′23.4″N 75°12′28.6″W
- Translator: 99.5 W258DV (Bethlehem)

Links
- Public license information: Public file; LMS
- Webcast: Listen live
- Website: loud995.com

WEST (1400 kHz) is a commercial AM radio station licensed to Easton, Pennsylvania, and serving the Lehigh Valley. It airs a rhythmic contemporary format, simulcast with WHOL (1600 AM). Both stations are owned by Major Keystone LLC. Studios and offices in Allentown.

WEST broadcasts with 1,000 watts. Its transmitter site is on St. John Street in Easton, near Interstate 78. Programming is also heard on 90 watt FM translator W258DV at 99.5 MHz in Bethlehem.

== History ==
=== 20th century ===
The station has traditionally traced its history to 1936, when it began broadcasting from Easton, Pennsylvania. However, Federal Communications Commission (FCC) records list the station's first license date as June 2, 1923, tracing its origin to the original license, issued as WDBC in Lancaster to Kirk Johnson & Co. The WDBC call sign was randomly assigned from a sequential roster of available call letters. In early 1926, WDBC was briefly deleted, but then relicensed a few months later, now as WKJC, again to Kirk Johnson & Co. at 16 West King Street in Lancaster.

In late 1935, the call letters were changed to WEST, in anticipation for a move from Lancaster to Easton. The station was locally owned and employed a general entertainment format evolving into a popular music format by the late 1940s. In 1948, WEST-FM signed on at 96.1 MHz. For decades, the FM station simulcast WEST's middle of the road (MOR) format. In 1973, the FM outlet became WLEV (now WCTO), and began an automated soft adult contemporary format, featuring softer rock hits of the 1960s and 1970s, along with current music, known as "Hit Parade Music". WEST (AM) continued with a MOR format, blending artists like Frank Sinatra, Nat King Cole, Peggy Lee, and others with some big bands and softer baby boomer pop sounds from the likes of Elvis Presley, The Beatles, Connie Francis, Neil Diamond, Tom Jones, The Carpenters, and others. Both WEST and WLEV were owned by Sound Media and then by Telemedia Group.

In the late 1970s, WEST dropped the adult contemporary and baby boomer pop songs, and switched to a big band and standards format. In 1981 it went back to more of a middle of the road format like that used in the mid-1970s, using a syndicated format called "Hitparade" that played half adult standards and half soft adult contemporary songs. In the late 1980s the station switched to a similarly formatted satellite service called "Stardust", which remained until 2001. Stardust leaned big bands and standards initially, but in the 1990s focused more on the soft AC and soft oldies artists mixed into the format. WEST had a local live morning and afternoon show as well as hours of specialty programs during the weekends, but the rest of the time used the Stardust format.

In 1995, the station was sold, along with WLEV, to Citadel Broadcasting. In 1997, Citadel acquired WFMZ (100.7 FM), which by then had a format that was evolving to be musically closer to WLEV. In 1997, it was decided that there was no need for two AC stations in the Lehigh Valley, so Citadel combined aspects of the AC formats from both stations and moved the WLEV call letters and format and some of the air staff to 100.7 that July.

WEST was sold to Maranatha Broadcasting, which previously owned WFMZ radio and still owned WFMZ-TV (channel 69). WEST simulcast the television station's 5 p.m. newscast. It was thought that WEST might switch to a religious format but that did not happen, as the station continued its MOR format as well as its specialty programs.

=== 21st century ===
In 2001, when WKAP (now WSAN) dropped Westwood One's Standards format for oldies, WEST switched to Westwood One's similar Standards format, which evolved to a slightly softer AC in 2002. The specialty shows and the WFMZ-TV newscasts remained.

In 2007, Maranatha sold WEST to Matthew J. Braccili, who also owns WHOL. That April, WEST began simulcasting the Spanish language format aired over WHOL. In December 2010, Matthew J. Braccili purchased FM translator W258BM (99.5 MHz) in Easton and began retransmitting WEST. On October 11, 2019, Braccili sold WEST, WHOL, and three FM translators to Victor Martinez's Hispanic Broadcasting Radio for $1.35 million.

On December 21, 2020, at 12 p.m, WEST switched to a rhythmic contemporary format branded as "Loud 99.5". The station ran commercial-free until after New Year Day. The new format began to simulcast on WHOL, which had split from WEST that October to program a conservative talk format, as "Loud 106.9/99.5" on January 6, 2021.

WEST, along with WHOL and FM translators W258DV and W295CR, was sold to Major Keystone LLC on January 17, 2022, in exchange for WGLD, WTKZ, and translator W296EA. Major Keystone had been programming WEST and WHOL since the launch of the "Loud" format. The swap was consummated on March 31, 2022.

== See also ==
- Media in the Lehigh Valley
