= WODE-FM =

Radio station in Easton, Pennsylvania

- Easton, Pennsylvania; United States
- Broadcast area: Lehigh Valley
- Frequency: 99.9 MHz (HD Radio)
- Branding: 99.9 The Hawk

Programming
- Format: Classic rock
- Subchannels: HD2: Simulcast of WEEX (Sports); HD3: Simulcast of WBSX (Active rock)

Ownership
- Owner: Cumulus Media; (Radio License Holding CBC, LLC)
- Sister stations: WEEX; WWYY; WLEV; WCTO

History
- First air date: 1948 (as WEEX-FM at 98.3)
- Former call signs: WEEX-FM (1948–1973); WQQQ (1973–1989); WHXT (1989–1991)
- Former frequencies: 98.3 MHz (1948-1950s)
- Call sign meaning: Oldies (previous format)

Technical information
- Licensing authority: FCC
- Facility ID: 8595
- Class: B
- ERP: 50,000 watts (analog); 2,000 watts (digital)
- HAAT: 137 meters (449 ft)
- Transmitter coordinates: 40°42′30.3″N 75°12′58.6″W
- Translator: See table below

Links
- Public license information: Public file; LMS
- Webcast: Listen live
- Website: www.999thehawk.com

WODE-FM (99.9 MHz, "99.9 The Hawk") is a commercial radio station licensed to serve Easton, Pennsylvania. The station's service contour covers the Lehigh Valley area of Pennsylvania and New Jersey.

The station is owned by Cumulus Media, through licensee Radio License Holding CBC, LLC, and broadcasts a classic rock radio format, playing rock hits from the 1960s into the early 1990s. WODE-FM's transmitter and former studio is on Paxinosa Road West in Easton, while their current studio and office are now on Avenue C in Bethlehem, where it shares the building with Cat Country 96.1, WLEV 100.7, and Fox Sports Radio (also owned by Cumulus Media). The station is frequently at or near the top of the ratings in the Allentown-Easton-Bethlehem radio market.

WODE-FM broadcasts using HD Radio, and simulcasts the sports programming of sister station 1230 AM WEEX on its HD2 subchannel and simulcasts the active rock programming of sister station 97.9 FM WBSX on its HD3 subchannel.

== History ==
=== WEEX-FM ===
The station began operations on 98.3 FM as a stand-alone FM station. It got its construction permit from the Federal Communications Commission in 1948, and signed on the air in June 1950. Its call letters stood for the Easton Express, Easton's daily newspaper as well as the station's owner. WEEX-FM was originally powered at only 1,000 watts.

In 1956, WSAN in nearby Allentown decided to give up its FM station on 99.9 MHz. The Easton Express took over the 99.9 frequency, boosting WEEX-FM's power to 16,000 watts. Also in the late 1950s, the newspaper put an AM station on the air at 1230 kHz under the WEEX call sign. In the early 1960s, WEEX switched to a Top 40 format and used the FM station to simulcast much of the programming to cover areas where the AM station's 1,000 watt signal could not be heard.

=== Beautiful music ===
In the late 1960s, WEEX-FM's simulcast with the AM was broken off under new Federal Communications Commission (FCC) rules which forbid full-time AM/FM simulcasts. The FM station switched to beautiful music under the WQQQ call sign.

The call letters were chosen because the lower-case Q closely resembled the number 9, hence the station's frequency 99.9. The station offered an instrumental-based easy listening format, playing cover versions of pop songs, as well as Broadway and Hollywood showtunes. A few times per hour a soft vocal was mixed in.

=== Contemporary hits ===
In late 1982, The Easton Express acquired The Globe-Times, a newspaper in nearby Bethlehem. To satisfy the FCC's media ownership rules, both WQQQ and WEEX were sold off to Wilks-Schwartz Broadcasting, so that the Easton Express would not own too many media outlets in the same market.

On April 4, 1983, WQQQ swapped formats with its AM sister station, WEEX. WEEX had evolved by 1981 from Top 40 into an adult contemporary format. WEEX's disc jockeys moved to 99.9 FM. WQQQ's easy listening format was moved to WEEX but it played more vocals than it did on FM.

The former WEEX format was modified on FM into mainstream CHR/Top 40. The station kept the WQQQ call sign but became known as "Q 100". Initially, the station focused on current pop music, but also played a moderate amount of 1960s and 1970s oldies until about 1985. Throughout the 1980s, WQQQ aired a Saturday evening oldies show. By 1986, the regular rotation was mostly current and recent titles.

At the time, Q100 was the only Top 40/CHR station in the Allentown/Easton/Bethlehem radio market, competing with then-dominate album rock station WZZO for first place in the ratings. However, on January 26, 1987, former mainstream adult contemporary station WAEB-FM switched to CHR as "Laser 104.1 WAEB-FM". While the change did not have an immediate impact on Q100's ratings, a burnt-out transmission line in the summer of 1988 forced the station to broadcast on low-power for a period of two weeks. This caused Q100's ratings to slip, allowing WAEB-FM to beat Q100 in the ratings.

In 1989, Roth Broadcasting acquired WQQQ and WEEX from Wilks-Schwartz. During the last week of August 1989, Q100 switched to a dance-leaning CHR format as "Hot 99.9" under the WHXT call sign. The format lasted about a year before returning to mainstream CHR.

After an uphill ratings battle with its rival WAEB-FM for almost two years, Hot 99.9 was unable to make any significant gains due to budget and signal issues. However, in its final ratings trend as a CHR, WHXT had beaten WAEB-FM by two-tenths of a point.

=== Oldies ===
On August 23, 1991, WHXT dropped its CHR format for oldies. The format played the hits of the 1950s, 1960s, and a few songs from the early 1970s. The call sign became WODE-FM (standing for "oldies") and the station became known as "Oldies 99" under programming consultant Pete Salant.

The station was sold to Patterson Broadcasting and became "Oldies 99.9" in the mid-1990s (adding the "point nine" in its handle as more radios employed digital tuners). In 1997, Capstar bought WODE-FM and WEEX as part of a multi-station deal, but spun the Easton stations off to Clear Channel Communications. Capstar had to do this because the Lehigh Valley has only five FM stations, and under FCC rules, no one company could own more than half. Capstar was already buying WZZO and WAEB-FM. Under Clear Channel ownership, WODE-FM continued its oldies format.

In 2000, Clear Channel announced a merger with AMFM Broadcasters (a company which was created as a result of a merger with Capstar and Chancellor), once again requiring WODE-FM to be sold due to an ownership conflict with WZZO and WAEB-FM. Clear Channel decided to swap WODE-FM and WEEX with Nassau Broadcasting Partners. Nassau was given cash plus WODE-FM and WEEX, while Clear Channel obtained stations in New Jersey, including WNNJ, WNNJ-FM, WSUS, WHCY, and management agreements for WDLC and WTSX. Clear Channel also kept the former Capstar/AMFM stations.

=== Classic hits ===
On August 31, 2001, at noon, WODE-FM switched from oldies to classic hits. The station was originally called "99-9 The River" but was forced to change its name because Clear Channel owned the rights to the name "The River". WODE-FM became known as "99-9 The Hawk". Its slogan was "The Valley's Classic Hits Station". The station's ratings generally led the market with the key 25-54 audience. WODE-FM hit #1 in the Fall 2001 Arbitron ratings in the Allentown market.

WODE-FM, along with nine other Nassau stations in New Jersey and Pennsylvania, was purchased at bankruptcy auction by NB Broadcasting in May 2012. NB Broadcasting was controlled by Nassau's creditors — Goldman Sachs, Pluss Enterprises, and P.E. Capital. WODE-FM was included in the deal after Goldman Sachs rejected a bid from Cumulus Media for the station. In November, NB Broadcasting filed a motion to assign its rights to the stations to Connoisseur Media. The sale to Connoisseur Media, at a price of $38.7 million, was consummated on May 29, 2013.

=== Classic rock ===
With the sale completed in July 2013, Connoisseur Media tweaked the format, giving it more of a rock focus and changing the slogan to "Classic Rock of the 70s, 80s and More".

In late 2013, WODE-FM acquired translator W234AX (94.7 FM), licensed to serve Allentown, from Family Life Ministries. The translator broadcast WODE-FM analog/HD1 programming until April 15, 2016, when it began simulcasting the programming of alternative rock sister station 107.1 WWYY via WODE-FM-HD2.

Effective June 26, 2019, Connoisseur Media swapped WODE-FM, WEEX, WTKZ, and WWYY, and translator W234AX to Cumulus Media in exchange for WEBE and WICC.

== Translator ==
WODE-FM-HD2, itself a simulcast of WEEX, is broadcast on the following translator:

Broadcast translator for WODE-FM-HD2
Call sign	Frequency	City of license	FID	ERP (W)	HAAT	Class	Transmitter coordinates	FCC info
W234AX	94.7 FM	Allentown, Pennsylvania	157407	10	204.9 m (672 ft)	D	40°35′55.4″N 75°25′10.7″W	LMS

== See also ==
- Media in the Lehigh Valley
