= WMGH-FM =

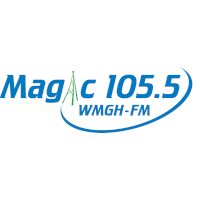
- Magic 105.5 WMGH-FM

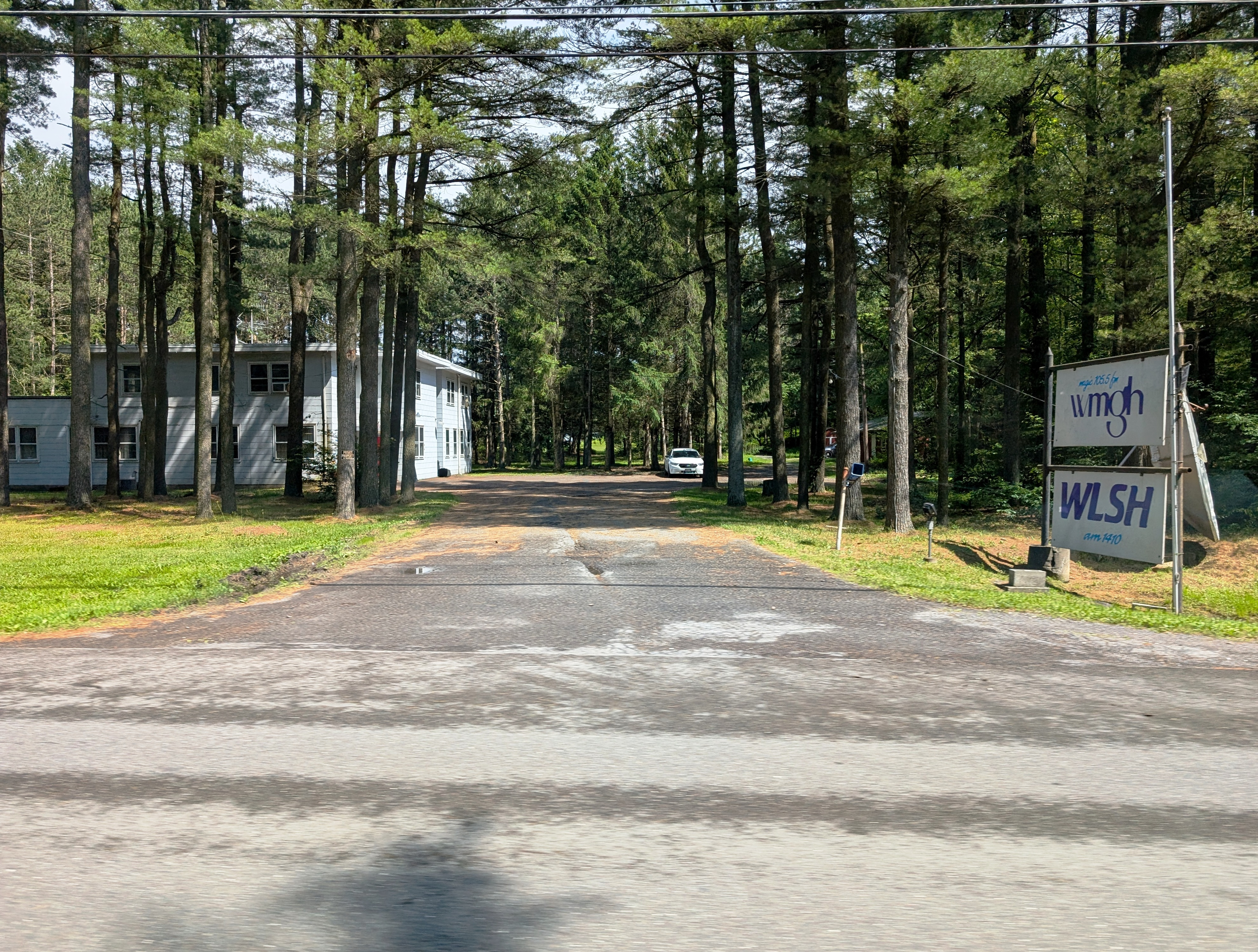
- Studios along US 209 in Nesquehoning, Pennsylvania
- Tamaqua, Pennsylvania; United States
- Frequency: 105.5 MHz
- Branding: Magic 105.5

Programming
- Language: English
- Format: Album Oriented Rock
- Affiliations: United Stations Radio Network; Westwood One, Salem Radio Network, Premiere Networks, Adlarge Media

Ownership
- Owner: CC Broadcasting, LLC.
- Sister stations: WGPA, WLSH

History
- First air date: June 14, 1965 (as WSVB)
- Former call signs: WSVB (1965–1972); WZTA (1972–1987); WCRN (1987)
- Call sign meaning: W MaGic Hits

Technical information
- Licensing authority: FCC
- Facility ID: 18231
- Class: A
- ERP: 1,400 watts
- HAAT: 148 meters (486 ft)
- Transmitter coordinates: 40°47′14″N 76°1′59″W

Links
- Public license information: Public file; LMS
- Webcast: Listen live
- Website: www.wmgh.com

WMGH-FM (105.5 FM; "Magic 105.5"), is an FM radio station in Tamaqua, Pennsylvania, sharing studios with co-owned WLSH in Lansford, Pennsylvania. WMGH broadcasts an Album Oriented Rock format. Magic 105.5 serves a five county area.

== History ==
105.5 FM Tamaqua signed on the air in June 1965 as WSVB-FM from the "Dutch Hill" section of Tamaqua. The station was owned by Sky View Broadcasting.

In 1971, the license was transferred to Z Broadcasting, Inc. and the call letters were changed to WZTA-FM. Under this new ownership the station was fully automated and broadcast an Easy listening format.

An application was filed with the Federal Communications Commission in 1977 to transfer ownership of WZTA from Z Broadcasting Inc. to Curran Communications, owners of WPAM in Pottsville. The antenna was relocated to a mountain in Tuscarora. Curran Communications kept the WZTA call letters until 1987 when it was changed to WCRN.

On February 28, 1987 WCRN was sold to East Penn Broadcasting. The station was renamed Magic 105.5 WMGH and began broadcasting an Adult contemporary format. In 1989 East Penn Broadcasting obtained ownership of WLSH in Lansford. The WMGH studio was relocated to the WLSH location later that year.

A license transfer was filed with the FCC on November 8, 2019 from J-Systems Franchising to CC Broadcasting, LLC. WLSH and WMGH began operation under new ownership on March 12, 2020. In June of that year both stations began to stream online 24/7. The format was changed to a rock and roll format, playing a mix of classic rock and new rock.
