= WLSH =

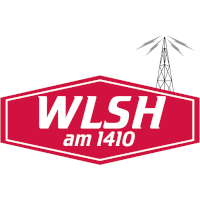

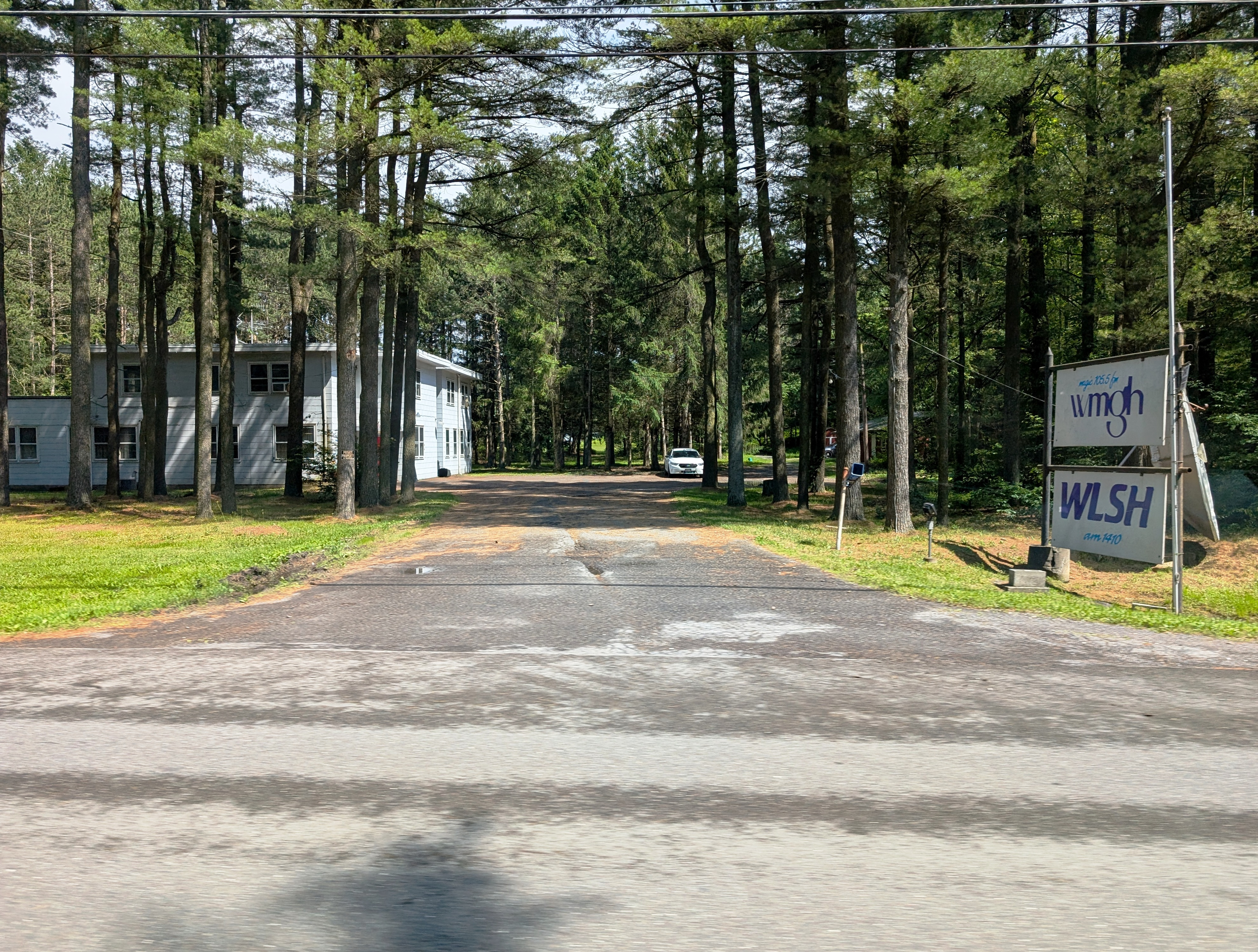
- Studios along US 209 in Nesquehoning, Pennsylvania
- Lansford, Pennsylvania; United States
- Frequency: 1410 kHz
- Branding: AM 1410 WLSH

Programming
- Language: English
- Format: Adult standards
- Affiliations: Townhall News; United Stations Radio Network; Westwood One

Ownership
- Owner: CC Broadcasting LLC
- Sister stations: WMGH-FM, WGPA

History
- First air date: December 24, 1952
- Call sign meaning: W Lansford Summit Hill

Technical information
- Licensing authority: FCC
- Facility ID: 18232
- Class: D
- Power: 5,000 watts daytime only
- Transmitter coordinates: 40°50′40.30″N 75°50′35.70″W

Links
- Public license information: Public file; LMS
- Webcast: Listen live
- Website: WLHS Online

WLSH (1410 AM) is a radio station broadcasting an adult standards music format. Licensed to Lansford, Pennsylvania, the station is owned by CC Broadcasting LLC. WLSH has a daytime power of 5,000 watts, serving portions of seven counties in East Central Pennsylvania including significant portions of the Allentown / Bethlehem market and the Wilkes-Barre / Scranton market. WLSH signed-on December 24, 1952.

== History ==
=== Miners Broadcasting ===
Initial filing with the Federal Communications Commission occurred on October 22, 1951. A construction permit was granted and the WLSH studios were built over the course of the next year. Station manager John "Bud" Angst oversaw the design and construction of the facility.

WLSH officially signed-on as a 1,000-watt daytime station on December 24, 1952. It was the first commercial AM radio station in Carbon County, Pennsylvania. WLSH was owned by Miners Broadcasting, which also owned AM 1450 WPAM and AM 1460 WMBA Ambridge.

On July 20, 1961, the FCC granted permission to construct a second tower and increase sunrise to sunset power to 5,000 watts.

Over the years many bands, schools, churches, and more used the station's production space for live broadcasts and recordings.

=== Pocono Anthracite Communications ===
Bud Angst, Director and Vice President of Miners Broadcasting, became sole owner WLSH on May 9, 1977, and formed Pocono Anthracite Communications. The branding at this time was "Great Radio 141 WLSH".

Bud was the first operator in northeast Pennsylvania to broadcast Christmas music from Thanksgiving through Orthodox Christmas. WLSH has one of the largest Christmas music libraries in the country.

The programming was a combination of music and talk radio. Some of the talk shows included "Air Your Opinion", which focused on issues of local, state, and national interest, "Dutch Trader", a free classified section where listeners buy, sell, trade, and give away items, "Ask Your Neighbor", a call-in recipe show. Volume One of the Ask Your Neighbor cookbook was printed in 1974, and the second volume was printed in 1977.

On January 2, 1985, Bud Angst announced his retirement and his plan to sell WLSH.

=== East Penn Broadcasting ===
On July 24, 1987, an agreement was reached between Pocono Anthracite Communications and East Penn Broadcasting. The transfer of WLSH was completed on January 1, 1989, after engineering studies were completed. In March 1989, WLSH was authorized to broadcast at night at 60 watts. It was now a 24 hour operation. As of October 28, 2025, it is only authorized for daytime operation.

East Penn Broadcasting had purchased WCRN-FM Tamaqua in February 1987, and renamed it Magic 105.5 WMGH-FM. In January 1989, the WMGH studio was relocated from Tamaqua to the WLSH location.

Hal Fulmer, owner of East Penn Broadcasting and HGF Media, died in December 2009. His wife and son took over operations of the radio stations as J-Systems Franchising.

=== CC Broadcasting ===
A license transfer was filed with the FCC on November 8, 2019, from J-Systems Franchising to CC Broadcasting, LLC. WLSH and WMGH began operation under new ownership on March 12, 2020, the day before the statewide shutdown. In June of that year both stations began to stream online 24/7.

== Previous Logos ==
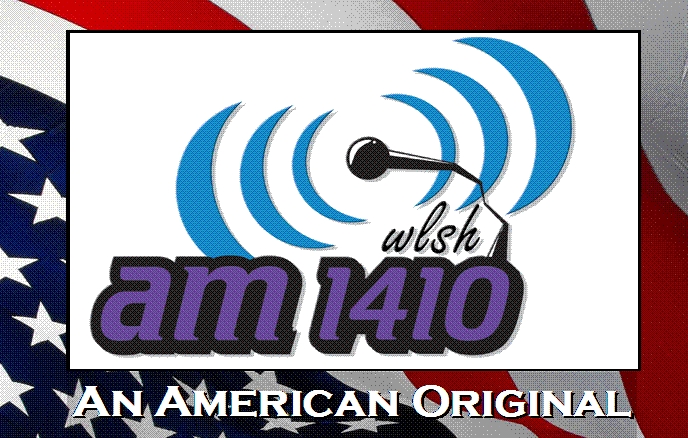
