= WEEX =

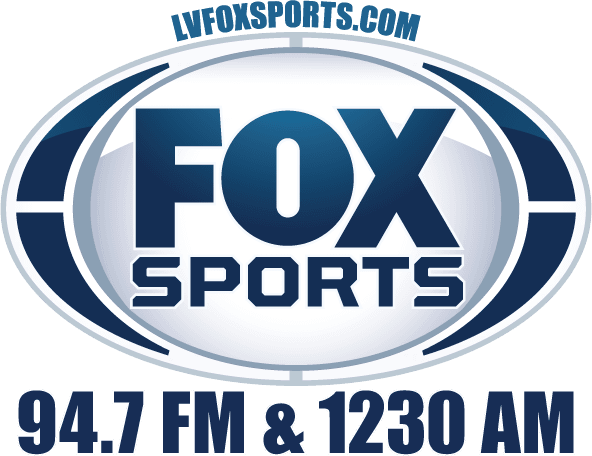
- Easton, Pennsylvania; United States
- Broadcast area: Lehigh Valley, Pennsylvania (Allentown-Bethlehem-Easton)
- Frequency: 1230 kHz
- Branding: Fox Sports Lehigh Valley

Programming
- Format: Sports
- Affiliations: Fox Sports Radio; Lehigh Valley IronPigs Baseball Radio Network; New York Giants Radio Network; NFL on Westwood One Sports

Ownership
- Owner: Cumulus Media; (Radio License Holding CBC, LLC)
- Sister stations: WCTO; WLEV; WODE-FM; WWYY

History
- First air date: May 10, 1956
- Former call signs: WODE (1991–1993); WIPI (1993–1996)
- Call sign meaning: Formerly owned by the Easton Express

Technical information
- Licensing authority: FCC
- Facility ID: 8596
- Class: C
- Power: 1,000 watts
- Translators: 94.7 W234AX (Allentown, relays WODE-FM HD2)
- Repeater: 99.9 WODE-FM HD2 (Easton)

Links
- Public license information: Public file; LMS
- Webcast: Listen live
- Website: www.lvfoxsports.com

WEEX (1230 AM) is a radio station in Easton, Pennsylvania, owned by Cumulus Media through licensee Radio License Holding CBC, LLC. The station airs a sports radio format branded as "Fox Sports Lehigh Valley", carrying the Fox Sports Radio network. It is also the flagship radio station for the Lehigh Valley IronPigs Minor League Baseball team, the Triple-A affiliate of the Philadelphia Phillies, and Lehigh Mountain Hawks athletics.

== History ==
=== 20th century ===
On May 10, 1956, WEEX first signed on with a popular music format, simulcast from WEEX-FM 99.9. It is one of the few AM stations to sign on after its FM sister station, which went on the air in 1948. WEEX-AM-FM were owned locally by Easton Publishing Company, which also owned the Easton Express newspaper. WEEX and WEEX-FM evolved into a Top 40 music format in the early 1960s. WEEX AM was only powered at 250 watts at the time and served listeners who only had an AM radio and could not receive WEEX-FM.

In the early 1970s, WEEX-FM's simulcast with the AM was broken off under Federal Communications Commission (FCC) changes which ended full-time AM/FM simulcasts in large and medium cities. The FM station switched to beautiful music under the WQQQ call sign. Those call letters were chosen because the lower-case Q closely resembled the number 9, representing the station's frequency of 99.9 MHz. WEEX evolved into an adult Top 40 format and later an oldies format focusing on music from the late 1960s mixed in with a few pre-1964 oldies an hour along with some 1970s hits and current songs.

By 1980, WEEX switched to adult contemporary music. In late 1982, longtime station owner Easton Publishing acquired The Globe-Times, a newspaper in nearby Bethlehem, Pennsylvania. To satisfy FCC media ownership rules, both WEEX and WQQQ were sold off to Wilks-Schwartz Broadcasting.

On April 4, 1983, WEEX swapped formats with its FM sister station, WQQQ. WEEX's airstaff and music library was moved to 99.9 FM. The former WEEX format was modified on FM into mainstream Top 40. WQQQ's easy listening format was moved to WEEX but would be more vocally-oriented than on FM. In the mid-1980s, WEEX tried a format of country music. In 1987, WEEX moved to adult standards.

In 1989, Roth Broadcasting acquired WQQQ and WEEX from Wilks-Schwartz. That September, WEEX switched formats to a satellite radio oldies service. WQQQ became a rhythmic CHR as WHXT. On August 23, 1991, WHXT dropped its CHR format for oldies. The format played the Hits of the 1950s, 1960s, and a few from the very early 1970s. The call letters became WODE-FM and the station became known as "Oldies 99" under programing consultant Pete Salant. WEEX then became WODE, simulcasting the FM's programming.

On August 9, 1993, the station dropped the WODE-FM simulcast and became a sports radio station, with most of its programming provided by Philadelphia's WIP (610 AM). To reflect this change, the call sign was changed to WIPI on August 23.

WIPI and WODE-FM were sold to Patterson Broadcasting in the mid-1990s. The WEEX call letters returned in 1996. On September 2, the station dropped the all-sports format and switched to classic country as an affiliate of the Real Country network. In 1997, Capstar acquired WODE and WEEX, but spun the stations off to Clear Channel Communications, the forerunner to today's iHeartMedia, Inc. Capstar had to do this because the Lehigh Valley has only five FM stations and no one company can own more than half. As a result, a company can only have 2 FM stations in the market. Capstar was already buying WZZO and WAEB-FM. Under Clear Channel ownership, WODE continued its oldies format. WEEX switched to a talk radio format.

=== 21st century ===
In 2001, Nassau Broadcasting Partners acquired WEEX and WODE. WEEX returned to sports radio as an ESPN Radio affiliate. WODE switched from Oldies to a rock-leaning classic hits format.

In 2004, Nassau took over the operations of WTKZ (1320 AM) in Allentown, which began simulcasting WEEX. The following year, on February 15, 2005, Nassau acquired WTKZ.

WEEX, along with nine other Nassau stations in New Jersey and Pennsylvania (including WTKZ), was purchased at bankruptcy auction by NB Broadcasting in May 2012. Nassau Broadcasting was controlled by Nassau's creditors, including Goldman Sachs, Pluss Enterprises, and P.E. Capital. In November 2012, Nassau Broadcasting filed a motion to transfer ownership of the stations to Connoisseur Media. The sale to Connoisseur Media, at a price of $38.7 million, was consummated on May 29, 2013.

In September 2018, WEEX and WTKZ flipped to Fox Sports Radio.

Effective June 26, 2019, Connoisseur Media swapped WEEX, WODE-FM, WTKZ, and WWYY, and translator W234AX to Cumulus Media in exchange for WEBE and WICC. Cumulus sold WTKZ to Major Keystone on September 24, 2021, splitting it from WEEX.

== See also ==
- Media in the Lehigh Valley
- WBYN (AM)
