= WJRH =

- Easton, Pennsylvania; United States
- Broadcast area: Lehigh Valley
- Frequency: 104.9 MHz
- Branding: 104-9 JRH

Programming
- Language: English
- Format: Freeform & College radio

Ownership
- Owner: Lafayette College

History
- First air date: 1946
- Former frequencies: 90.5 FM
- Call sign meaning: W James Renwick Hogg

Technical information
- Licensing authority: FCC
- Facility ID: 36224
- Class: D
- ERP: 8 watts
- HAAT: 7 meters (23 ft)
- Transmitter coordinates: 40°41′53.00″N 75°12′30.00″W

Links
- Public license information: Public file; LMS
- Website: www.wjrh.org

WJRH (104.9 FM) is a college radio station that is licensed to Lafayette College in Easton, Pennsylvania, in the Lehigh Valley region near the eastern edge of the state. The station, which is student managed, broadcasts a freeform format, where students and community volunteers have complete freedom in selecting the music they play.

While WJRH transmits with just 8 watts of effective radiated power, its primary local signal covers the entire city of Easton and about half of neighboring Phillipsburg, New Jersey. Within the station's distant and fringe coverage areas are three adjacent boroughs and five suburban townships, though reception can depend on the terrain.

== History ==
WJRH first established licensure with the Federal Communications Commission (FCC) in 1946, broadcasting under a Class D educational license on 90.5 FM. As FM frequencies grew in demand, the FCC mandated that stations operating in the frequency range currently provided to WJRH increase their power to serve larger audiences. Since WJRH was only to serve the Lafayette community, it was decided to give the frequency to another facility and relocate to its current home frequency, 104.9. WJRH alumni have become influential individuals in the broadcasting field, ranging from Engineering Directors for networks such as the American Broadcasting Company (ABC), to public broadcasting policy makers.

== Facility ==
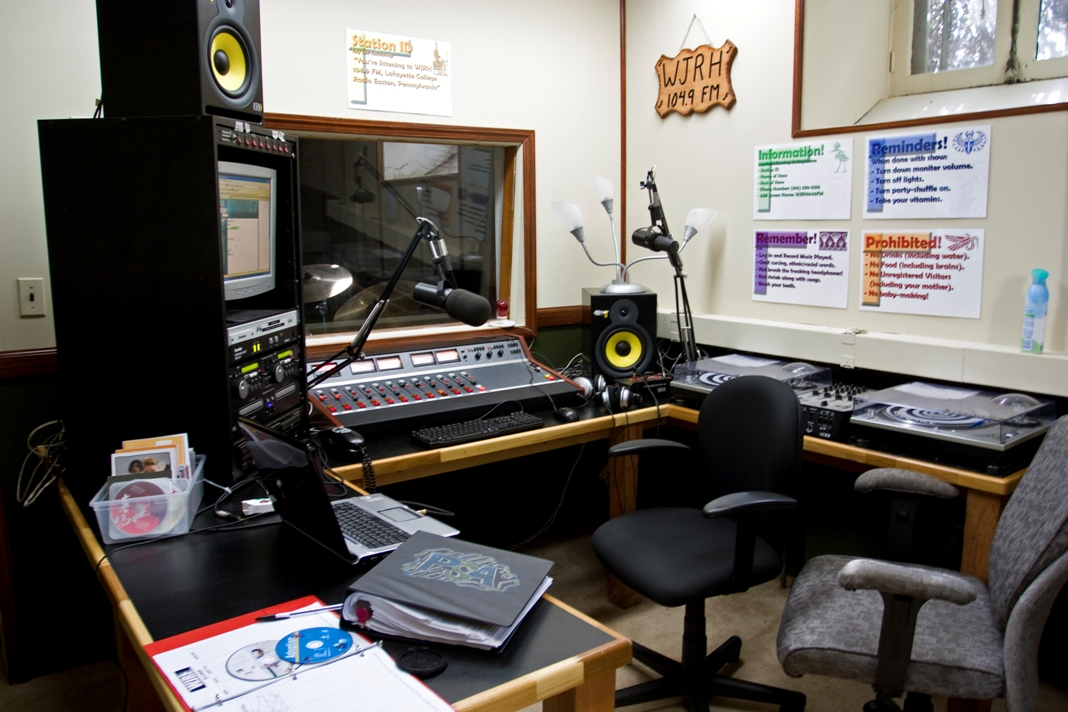
WJRH's current studio.

WJRH has been housed in its current location, Hogg Hall, for more than thirty years. The facility is divided into three sound-proofed rooms. The first is the onair studio, which serves as the control center for all outgoing transmissions. In addition to its control board, the room is equipped for playing vinyl records, compact discs (CD), cassette tapes, and tape carts. The second room is a large studio for performances by bands and interviews with guests. The studio's third room is a production studio, where DJs can record live performances using an eight-track digital audio tape (DAT) recorder, mix live feeds from the university's sports facilities, and produce promotional "spots" to air during programs.

== See also ==
- Media in the Lehigh Valley
- List of college radio stations in the United States
