= WGPA =

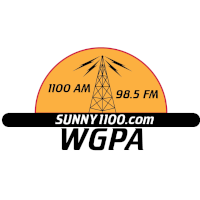
- Bethlehem, Pennsylvania, U.S.; United States
- Broadcast area: Lehigh Valley, Pennsylvania, U.S.
- Frequency: 1100 kHz
- Branding: Sunny 1100

Programming
- Format: Ameripolitan, oldies
- Affiliations: SRN News

Ownership
- Owner: CC Broadcasting, LLC
- Sister stations: WMGH-FM, WLSH

History
- First air date: February 16, 1946 (80 years ago)
- Call sign meaning: W Globe Publishing Authority

Technical information
- Licensing authority: FCC
- Facility ID: 67137
- Class: D
- Power: 250 watts (daytimer)
- Translator: 98.5 W253CC (Bethlehem)

Links
- Public license information: Public file; LMS
- Webcast: Listen live
- Website: Sunny1100.com

WGPA (1100 kHz) is a Class D daytimer radio station, licensed to Bethlehem, Pennsylvania, serving the Lehigh Valley region of eastern Pennsylvania. The station is owned by CC Broadcasting, LLC, and airs a radio format called Ameripolitan, including rockabilly, 1950s and 1960s oldies, classic country, and polka music. World and national news is supplied by SRN News. WGPA's radio studios and offices are at 2311 Easton Avenue in Bethlehem.

Because AM 1100 is a clear channel frequency, WGPA must sign off at night to protect WTAM in Cleveland, the Class A station on 1100 kHz. (Radio waves travel farther at night.) The transmitter is at 1080 Win Drive. WGPA is heard around the clock on 250-watt FM translator W253CE at 98.5 MHz.

== History ==
=== 20th century ===
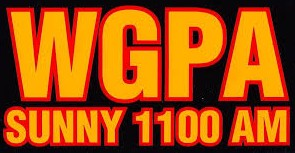
WGPA's previous logo

WGPA was originally a part of the Bethlehem Globe Publishing Authority, from which the call sign was derived. Both WGPA and its sister station, WGPA-FM (now WZZO), began broadcasting on February 16, 1946. The studios were located at 426 Brodhead Avenue, next to the Globe-Times daily newspaper building. At the time, WGPA-AM and FM were simulcast. The FCC license stated ownership as A-B-E Broadcasting, a division of the Bethlehem Globe Times Newspapers, signifying Allentown-Bethlehem-Easton as the coverage area.

WGPA AM 1100 originally broadcast popular music from that time period. The original musical lineup primarily consisted of big bands featuring artists such as Perry Como, Frank Sinatra, Artie Shaw, Glenn Miller, and Doris Day. In the early 1950s, Bob Wolken, a recent graduate of Liberty High School, started at the station performing odd jobs. He eventually became an on-air announcer, who would remain through changes in ownership and formats into the 1990s. Wolken's smooth style was the wake up voice for generations of Bethlehem-area residents for many years. His program was called "In the Book" and it aired from sign on time to 9:30 am Monday through Saturdays.

WGPA AM has always been a daytimer station. Its broadcast hours are limited to a dawn to dusk operation. Because of this limitation, WGPA-FM would carry local live sports coverage after sunset. This included high school basketball and high school football. By the 1960s, the FM station's daytime programming was featuring beautiful music, including Mantovani, Ferrante & Teicher, Ray Conniff, and Henry Mancini. On the FM side, the station broadcast The Velvet Touch, hosted by Bob Deacon.

In 1973, Bethlehem Globe Publishing Authority began to divest itself of its radio holdings. WGPA AM and FM were sold to Holt Broadcasting for approximately $125,000. The FM station became WEZV, "Easy 95", playing easy listening music in stereo. By the late 1970s, the FM station's call letters switched to WZZO, "Z-95", playing album-oriented rock, and has remained in a rock music format since. WZZO's headquarters were established at the Westgate Mall in Bethlehem, and later moved to Whitehall Township.

In 1978, Holt sold WGPA 1100 to Henry Chadwick for approximately $400,000. The offices and studios were later moved to the Dodson Building at 528 North New Street. Soon after, the station adopted the moniker "Sunny 1100," playing a mix of adult standards and soft adult contemporary music, with local news, weather and traffic. Among the notable WGPA alumni from this period was Bill Zimpfer, who played music and provided play-by-play for Lehigh University football before moving on to sports radio jobs with Pennsylvania State University and the Miami Dolphins.

WGPA’s office and studio at 426 Brodhead Ave. Bethlehem in 1979

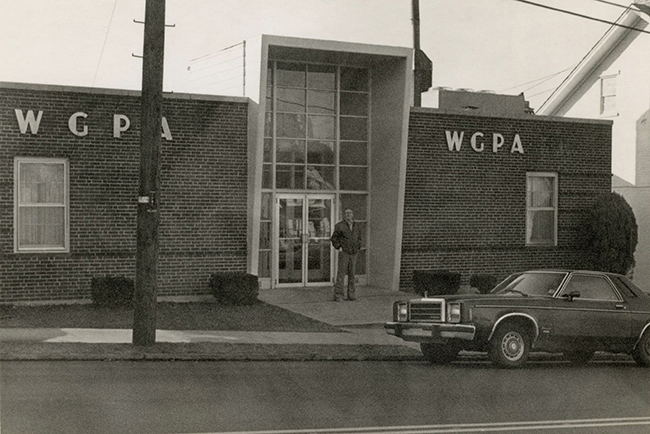

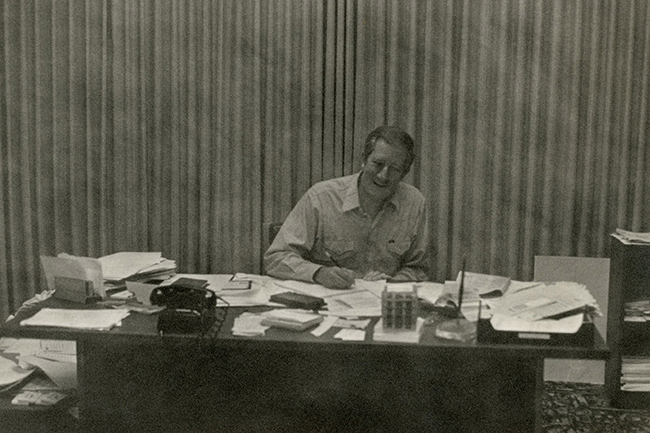

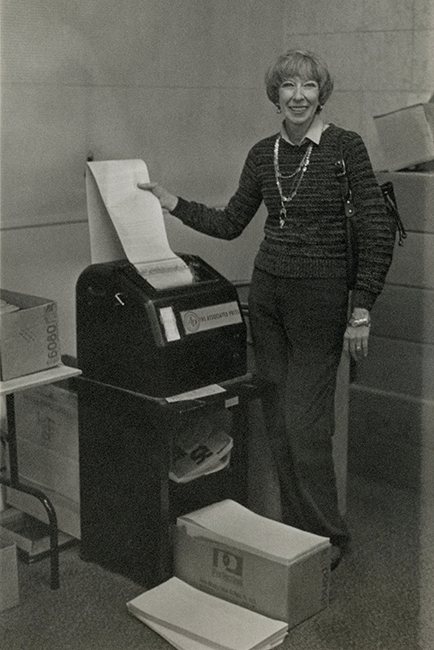

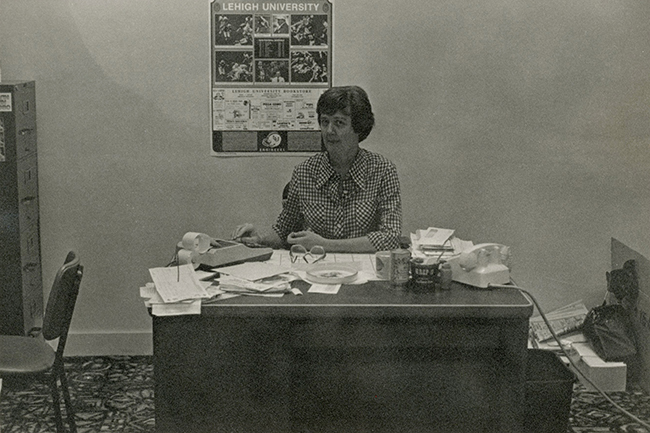

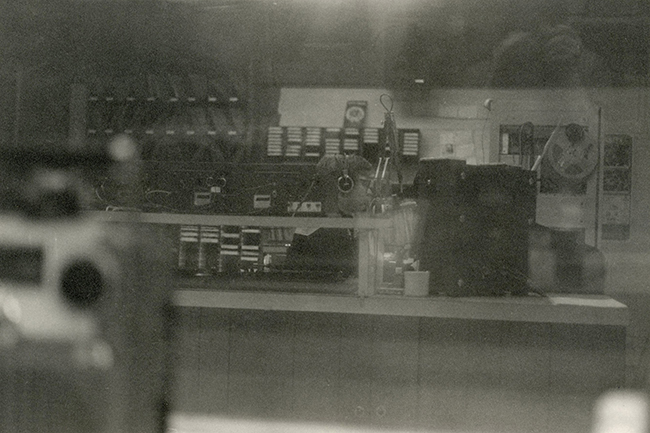

In 1991, Joe Timmer acquired WGPA AM 1100 from Chadwick Broadcasting for $125,000. In addition to nostalgia and oldies music, the station included a variety of locally hosted specialty programming, including The Lehigh Valley Means Business, hosted by Bethlehem Attorney Bruce Davis, which aired for over a decade. Other programs include Parenting Matters with Francine Bianco Tax, Kisslinger & Company, hosted by Larry Kisslinger and sponsored by Service Electric, and sports talk show Jack, Joe & Company, with co-hosts Jack Logic and Joe Craig. WGPA kept to its roots, airing polka music three times daily, including the station's flagship program, the Jolly Joe Timmer Polka Show, middays, Monday through Friday.

=== 21st century ===
In January 2013, WGPA announced that due to the sale of the Dodson Building, studios would be moving. In May 2013, WGPA began broadcasting from new studios at 429 East Broad Street in Bethlehem.

In March 2015, due to his declining health, Timmer's family sold the station to CC Broadcasting, LLC for $95,000. The purchase was consummated on May 29, 2015.

== Programming ==
The station format change to "Ameripolitan" was introduced in May 2015. This format features music not otherwise heard on the airwaves in the Lehigh Valley, including rockabilly, 1950s and 60s oldies, classic country and polka music. SRN news and traffic from WFMZ-TV 69 News are included in the daily programming. WGPA also broadcasts high school football and other sports.

On September 16, 2015, WGPA hosted a four-hour reunion of former station employees. The program, hosted by Robin Miller and broadcast live, celebrated much of the station's history through story-telling and remembrances from the likes of Miller, Gil Ackroyd, Jerry Dean, Mario Markozzi, and 1950s local singing stars, the JAN Sisters.

A selection of local programs are archived at the station's website and may be accessed any time. The station offers live streaming from the website. Programs can be accessed via an app which then allows tablet and smart phone users to listen anytime over TuneIn, a music app.

=== FM translator ===
The FCC issued a construction permit for low-power FM translator W256BQ, which was purchased by CC Broadcasting LLC from a station in Olean, New York, at a reported $75,000. Plans were for the translator to operate on 93.3 FM with a power of 250 watts and would be mounted on the existing AM tower with a directional signal toward the center of Bethlehem. This would allow listeners to hear WGPA 24 hours a day.

The translator was licensed on April 19, 2017, as W227DE, however, the grant was rescinded on May 5, 2017. A new construction permit was issued for 98.5 W253CC on August 10, 2017, also with an effective radiated power of 250 watts. The translator's antenna points toward South Bethlehem and Hellertown, operating around the clock.

== See also ==
- Media in the Lehigh Valley
