= WJCS =

- Allentown, Pennsylvania; United States
- Broadcast area: Lehigh Valley
- Frequency: 89.3 MHz (HD Radio)
- Branding: WJCS-FM

Programming
- Format: Christian radio
- Subchannels: HD2: Spanish Christian radio "Radio Amistad"
- Affiliations: Moody Broadcast Network

Ownership
- Owner: Beacon Broadcasting Corporation

History
- First air date: August 1995
- Call sign meaning: Jesus Christ

Technical information
- Licensing authority: FCC
- Facility ID: 4370
- Class: A
- ERP: 120 watts
- HAAT: 279 meters
- Transmitter coordinates: 40°33′52″N 75°26′24″W
- Translators: 97.7 W249CA (Bangor); 106.3 W292EQ (Lehigh Township); 106.5 W293CP (Kutztown); 92.1 W221CU (Allentown, relays HD2)

Links
- Public license information: Public file; LMS
- Website: www.wjcs.org www.radioamistad.net (HD2)

WJCS (89.3 FM) is a non-commercial radio station licensed to Allentown, Pennsylvania. The station is owned by Beacon Broadcasting Corporation, and airs a religious format.

The station broadcasts in HD Radio and streams online.

In 2018, WJCS signed on translators W292EQ serving Lehigh Township on 106.3 FM and W293CP serving Kutztown on 106.5 FM.

== See also ==
- Media in the Lehigh Valley
