= WTKZ =

- Allentown, Pennsylvania; United States
- Broadcast area: Lehigh Valley
- Frequency: 1320 kHz
- Branding: Mega 101.7

Programming
- Language: Spanish
- Format: Spanish CHR

Ownership
- Owner: Victor Martinez; (VP Broadcasting LLC)

History
- First air date: March 8, 1947
- Former call signs: WKAP (1947–1994)
- Call sign meaning: From former talk radio format

Technical information
- Licensing authority: FCC
- Facility ID: 27510
- Class: B
- Power: 750 watts day; 195 watts night
- Translator: 101.7 W269DY (Allentown)

Links
- Public license information: Public file; LMS
- Website: tumusicapa.com

WTKZ (1320 AM) is a radio station in Allentown, Pennsylvania. It is owned by Victor Martinez, through licensee VP Broadcasting LLC, and broadcasts a Spanish language contemporary hit radio format known as Mega 101.7.

== History ==
AM 1320 began operation on March 8, 1947, as WKAP, a 1,000-watt daytimer at 1580 kHz. It was owned by Rahall Communications, with R.J. Rahall as president. In the 1950s, WKAP played middle of the road music with some softer songs by rock and roll artists. Throughout the 1960s, WKAP had a Top 40 format, combined with relatively apolitical call-in talk shows. By 1970, the station evolved to more of an adult contemporary format.

In 1972, WKAP moved to Adult Top 40, to compete with the two Top 40 stations in the Lehigh Valley, WAEB, which was current music based, and WEEX, which played some oldies mixed with Top 40. WKAP's Top 40 format emulated West Coast giant KCBQ in San Diego. Some of the original WKAP disc jockeys were Kevin Fennessy, Walt Brown, Shotgun Steve Kelly, Mark Stewart, Kris Bailey, Billy Sheridan, and J. Robert Taylor. Other DJs in the late-1970s included Wolinski In The Morning, Gene O'Brien, Weird Beard Don Foxx, and Smokin' Doug Hanley. The station was known as WKAP Radio 13 (rounded off to the nearest hundred).

In September 1978, Mike Jacobs, a local club DJ, came up with an idea to broadcast live an entire evening of music commercial-free from a local nightclub. Program Director Chris Bailey and Station Manager Jerry Duckett were interested in the project to help compete with 790 WAEB and add a boost to WKAP's ratings.

The club was called "The Castle Garden Ballroom", located in Dorney Park & Wildwater Kingdom in Allentown. The park's owners, Robert Plarr and Robert Ott, were also on board for this project. After extensive renovations, Castle Garden was opened for business in late 1978. Crowds averaged about 300-450 per night and the owners and management were looking for a spark to drive increased patronage. The ballroom had a capacity of approximately 2,000 people and 300-450 looked pretty thin at the time.

The idea was refined, and in January 1979, Studio 13 debuted. It was broadcast Saturdays from 9 p.m. to 2 a.m., with Mike Jacobs as the DJ/Host/MC. Bill Sheridan was the mixer and board tech. Pepsi became a primary sponsor. Commercials were inserted by voicing them while the music played without interruption. The show opened with the Parliament's "Get Off Your Ass and Jam", followed by Bell and James' "Livin' It Up (Friday Night)". The lyrics contained curse words, which resulted in a warning by the Federal Communications Commission (FCC) to the station and made the local news. The first night the crowd was 600 people. After the news coverage and word of mouth, Studio 13 averaged 2,000 people per night and could have done more had there not been a fire marshal's limit on the number of people.

WKAP realized a ratings jump from 3.8 to 23.4, Saturday evenings from 9 to midnight in a one-month period and maintained this throughout the summer until the show's conclusion on Labor Day 1979 at the park's request. The management of Castle Garden also invested in and shot a 1-hour video pilot entitled "Castle Garden" that it attempted unsuccessfully to syndicate.

The one bright spot was in the fall of 1979 in New York City at the Annual Billboard Disco Forum and Convention. Mike Jacobs received an honorable mention as "DJ of the Year" for the Philadelphia region and was invited to spin at the Roseland Ballroom during the convention. WKAP also fared well at this convention being nominated for "Most Innovative Breakout Radio Show" for the year 1979, but lost out to WCAU-FM in Philadelphia, which is now WOGL. Jacobs continued in radio and clubs in the area working at WGPA and WLEV-FM until 1997. Some of the other WKAP air personalities moved on to other outlets, such as Bill Sheridan to WKRZ in Wilkes-Barre, WODE-FM in Easton, and Kris Bailey to WAEB.

By 1980, WKAP evolved into more of an adult contemporary music format. At the end of summer 1982, WKAP dropped the adult contemporary format for an adult standards format, which was known as the "Music Of Your Life". The station featured easy listening vocalists from the 1940s, 1950s, and 1960s, as well as big band music from the 1930s and 1940s. The station also played a limited number of soft pop songs from the 1970s.

The station stayed with this format through the 1980s. In 1984, Gulf Broadcasting sold WKAP to Holt Broadcasting, which at the time also owned WZZO. WKAP stayed with its standards music format, but added a bit more baby boomer pop, including Elvis Presley and The Beatles. In the late 1980s, the station was sold to Gulf Broadcasting in the late 1970s.

In 1990, WKAP switched to a satellite radio oldies music format, playing mostly songs from 1964 to 1969, though it mixed in music from as early as 1955 and as late as 1973. WKAP continued with this format until 1992, returning to adult standards using Westwood One's "AM Only" Network. This featured mostly standards and pop as well as some soft rock music of the 1950s, 1960s and 1970s. The decision to abandon oldies music in 1992 was due to WODE-FM adopting the format in late 1991.

In 1992, Holt Broadcasting also bought WXKW, which remained a country music station for another year. In 1993, the station switched to a satellite oldies format when WKAP flipped back to standards. A year later, on October 9, 1994, WKAP changed its call letters to WTKZ and became a talk radio station. This format was dropped on September 3, 1996, in favor of sports radio. In 1999, Holt sold WTKZ to Mega Communications, which changed the station to a tropical music format.

On August 2, 2004, Nassau Broadcasting Partners took over the station's operations, and made it into a simulcast of sports radio station WEEX. The following year, on February 14, 2005, it acquired WTKZ. WTKZ, along with nine other Nassau stations in New Jersey and Pennsylvania (including WEEX), was purchased at bankruptcy auction by NB Broadcasting in May 2012. Nassau Broadcasting was controlled by Nassau's creditors, including Goldman Sachs, Pluss Enterprises, and P.E. Capital. In November 2012, Nassau Broadcasting filed a motion to transfer ownership of the stations to Connoisseur Media. The sale to Connoisseur Media, at a price of $38.7 million, was consummated on May 29, 2013.

In 2018, WTKZ and WEEX switched from ESPN Radio to Fox Sports Radio.

On June 26, 2019, Connoisseur Media swapped WTKZ, WEEX, WODE-FM, and WWYY, and translator W234AX to Cumulus Media in exchange for WEBE and WICC. Cumulus sold WTKZ to Major Keystone on September 24, 2021; the sale was consummated on January 14, 2022. The station was swapped to VP Broadcasting on January 27, 2022; VP already owned an Allentown-area translator which was airing its La Mega format and was using a leased HD Radio subchannel of WLEV (100.7 FM) to feed it.
