= WWYY =

Simulcast of WCTO, Easton, Pennsylvania
- Belvidere, New Jersey; United States
- Broadcast area: Pocono Mountains, New Jersey Skylands, Lehigh Valley
- Frequency: 107.1 MHz
- Branding: Cat Country 96 & 107

Programming
- Format: Country music
- Affiliations: Compass Media Networks; Westwood One; Philadelphia Eagles Radio Network

Ownership
- Owner: Cumulus Media; (Radio License Holding CBC, LLC)
- Sister stations: WCTO; WEEX; WLEV; WODE-FM

History
- First air date: October 15, 1992
- Former call signs: WRNJ-FM (1992–98)
- Call sign meaning: Onetime member of the regional New Country Y-107 quadcast

Technical information
- Licensing authority: FCC
- Facility ID: 54689
- Class: A
- ERP: 840 watts
- HAAT: 219 meters (719 ft)
- Transmitter coordinates: 40°56′53.3″N 75°9′36.6″W

Links
- Public license information: Public file; LMS
- Webcast: Listen live
- Website: catcountry96.com

WWYY (107.1 FM) is a class A radio station licensed to Belvidere, New Jersey. It serves The Poconos and Lehigh Valley regions of Pennsylvania, and the Skylands Region of New Jersey. The station is owned by Cumulus Media, through licensee Radio License Holding CBC, LLC, and airs a country music radio format known as "Cat Country 96", simulcasting WCTO (96.1 FM) in Easton, Pennsylvania.

== History ==
=== Early years ===
On October 15, 1992, WWYY began operation as WRNJ-FM under the co-ownership of Norman Worth and Larry Tighe, who still retain the call sign WRNJ (formerly on 1000 kHz, now on 1510 kHz). WRNJ-FM offered a country music format to the northwestern New Jersey and Poconos. Except for the Lehigh Valley, which had a Philadelphia-based country/western music station, most of this region was without its own country music station after WIXL, now WNNJ, dropped country music in May 1988. For a few months, northwestern New Jersey and the Poconos could get country music on New York City-based WYNY (97.1 FM). That changed in October 1988, when separate sales of WYNY's license and intellectual property resulted in the station "moving" to WYNY (103.5 FM), and as a result, the format listeners could not hear country/western music because of WNNJ-FM held (and still does) 103.7 FM frequency, blocking 103.5 FM out of the area. WQHT/WYNY switched to a hip-hop/R&B format.

For the next four years, the Northwestern New Jersey/Pocono Mountains of Pennsylvania could not receive country music on the radio. WRNJ-FM finally filled that hole by broadcasting country and western music over 1510 AM. However, financially troubled WFMV out of Blairstown abruptly became "Hot Country 106.3 WHCY". The area went from receiving no country stations to two.

Both WRNJ-FM and WHCY used large amounts of satellite programming. By the beginning of 1994, WHCY switched from satellite to live-broadcasting full-time. WRNJ-FM continued with satellite programming. As a result, WHCY clearly became the stronger country music station. Both stations still held their own. WRNJ-FM tended to pull decent ratings in Warren County, New Jersey, while WHCY pulled good ratings in Sussex County. In the summer of 1997, Easton based 96.1 WLEV adopted a country music format and became "WCTO Cat Country 96.1". The WLEV intellectual unit moved to 100.7 FM, where it remains today.

WCTO had a good signal not only in the Lehigh Valley, but in much of the Poconos, and in Sussex and Warren County. As a result, WRNJ-FM and WHCY went down, with WRNJ-FM hurt more by the presence of "Cat Country" because of its proximity to Easton, Pennsylvania. WRNJ-FM was pulling very low ratings by the spring of 1998.

=== New Country Y-107 ===
WRNJ-FM was shut down at the end of April 1998 and was leased to Big City Radio, which operated New Country Y-107, a then-three station simulcast of country music focused on the New York City suburbs. Big City then purchased the station later in the year and gave it the call sign WWYY, to match the others in the network.

Big City Radio, however, underwent changes that would doom the station several years later. The increasing presence of Hispanic investors beginning in 1999 led to changes to Spanish-language formats at other simulcast stations in the company, and its financial position worsened. In May 2002, New Country Y-107 yielded to Spanish contemporary hits as "Rumba 107.1". It was not enough to save the company, which then marketed its stations for sale.

=== Nassau ownership ===
Logo as "Lite 107"

Nassau Broadcasting Partners purchased the four Rumba stations in 2003. It proceeded to break up the network and sell all of them except for WWYY, which it retained and relaunched as adult contemporary "Lite 107". The station moved from Hackettstown, New Jersey, to Nassau's facilities in Stroudsburg, Pennsylvania, that also housed WVPO and WSBG. Worth and Tighe retained the transmitter site in Belvidere. Steve Gallagher (WOBM), as Program Director/PM Drive, created the "Lite 107" brand, and with a collaborative effort by Paul Fuhr (WOBM) as Mornings/Imaging Director, who designed and implemented the Lite 107 marketing campaign. Following Gallagher's departure in late 2003, Rod Bauman, who also served as WVPO's program director, took over the station and instituted an automated PM Drive programing: 'Lite Love Songs' (7:00 pm – midnight) (Imaging Paul Fuhr using Jim Merkel). In 2006, Nassau arranged the sale of its Poconos/Lehigh Valley cluster to an African American owned company called Access.1 Communications, including WWYY, but the deal fell through. The failed sale served as an opportunity to change the Nassau Broadcasting unit. On May 3, 2007, after playing "My Heart Will Go On" by Celine Dion, WWYY and WSBG swapped formats; WSBG became "Lite 93.5", and WWYY became mainstream rock as "107 The Bone". The first song on 107 The Bone was "Bad to the Bone" by George Thorogood & the Destroyers.

WWYY, along with nine other Nassau stations in New Jersey and Pennsylvania, was purchased at bankruptcy auction by NB Broadcasting in May 2012. NB Broadcasting is controlled by Nassau's creditors — Goldman Sachs, Pluss Enterprises, and P.E. Capital. In November, NB Broadcasting filed a motion to assign its rights to the stations to Connoisseur Media. The sale, at a price of $38.7 million, was consummated on May 29, 2013.

On October 31, 2014, at 12:00 pm, WWYY flipped to alternative rock as "Spin Radio 107.1". The last song on 107 The Bone was "The End" by The Doors, while the first song on Spin Radio 107.1 was "The Mother We Share" by Chvrches. The station was programmed by PD/MD Sal Palazzolo. Spin Radio was unannounced well into the following year when jocks were finally introduced in May 2015. Riley Reed handled mornings, "Becker" was on afternoons, Joe Brown did the night show and Liam was on weekends and fill-ins for the other jocks. The station became notorious for giving away tickets to local and regional shows, and bringing in artists for "Spin Sessions" at the ArtsQuest Center at SteelStacks. On April 16, 2016, Spin Radio began simulcasting on 94.7 W234AX Allentown, which also broadcast on the second HD Radio channel of WODE-FM, further expanding its signal into the Lehigh Valley. The additional signal showed an increase in listening in the Lehigh Valley, most of the station's listening was still in the southern Poconos and Northern Lehigh Valley where the main signal for WWYY was strongest.

On May 1, 2019, the station began operating under a local marketing agreement between Connoisseur Media and Cumulus Media; the sale to Cumulus eventually closed on June 26, 2019, and the studios were moved from the WSBG/WVPO studios in Stroudsburg into the WODE-FM studio building in Easton. On October 14, 2019, WWYY changed its simulcast of country-formatted WCTO.

== Sports programming ==
In 2009, WWYY became the broadcast affiliate for the New York Yankees Radio Network, replacing sister stations WEEX and WTKZ in the Lehigh Valley/Poconos region. The affiliation ended after the 2013 season when the Yankees' flagship moved to WFAN.

== See also ==
- Media in the Lehigh Valley
