= WLEV =

Radio station in Allentown, Pennsylvania

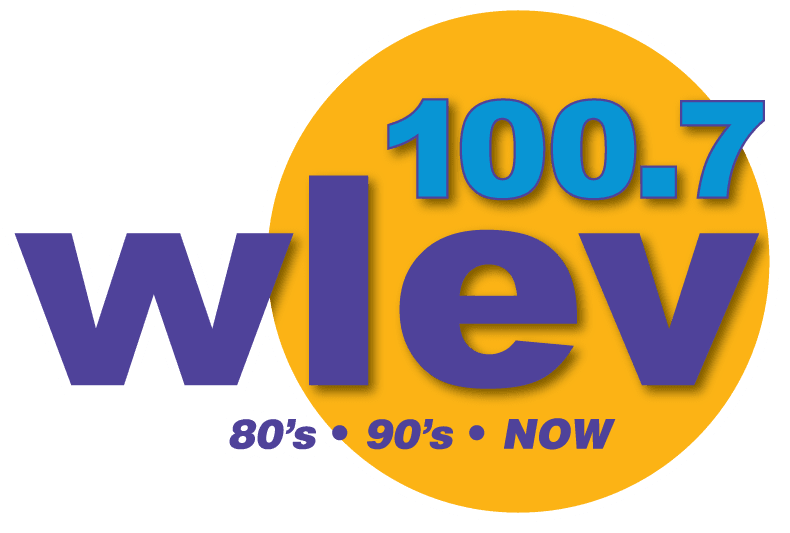
- Allentown, Pennsylvania; United States
- Broadcast area: Lehigh Valley
- Frequency: 100.7 MHz (HD Radio)
- Branding: 100.7 WLEV

Programming
- Format: Adult contemporary music
- Subchannels: HD2: "Mega 92.9" (Spanish contemporary hit radio)
- Affiliations: Westwood One

Ownership
- Owner: Cumulus Media; (Radio License Holding CBC, LLC)
- Sister stations: WCTO; WEEX; WWYY

History
- First air date: July 1947
- Former call signs: WFMZ (1947–1997)
- Call sign meaning: Lehigh Valley

Technical information
- Licensing authority: FCC
- Facility ID: 39875
- Class: B
- ERP: 9,900 watts
- HAAT: 329 meters (1,079 ft)
- Transmitter coordinates: 40°33′52″N 75°26′24″W
- Translator: See § HD programming and translators

Links
- Public license information: Public file; LMS
- Webcast: Listen live; HD2: Listen live
- Website: www.wlevradio.com; HD2: tumusicapa.com

WLEV (100.7 FM, "100.7 WLEV") is a commercial radio station licensed to Allentown, Pennsylvania, covering the Lehigh Valley and part of New Jersey. It is owned by Cumulus Media and broadcasts an adult contemporary radio format, switching to Christmas music for much of November and December. The studios are on Avenue C in Bethlehem, near the Lehigh Valley International Airport.

WLEV has an effective radiated power (ERP) of 9,900 watts. The transmitter is co-located on the WFMZ-TV broadcast tower on South Mountain, south of Allentown. WLEV broadcasts using HD Radio technology. Its digital subchannel carries a Spanish contemporary hits format known as "Mega 92.9". It feeds 99-watt FM translator W225CF in Reading, Pennsylvania, at 92.9 MHz.

== History ==
=== 100.7 frequency ===
==== Easy listening and Christian radio ====
The station signed on the air in July 1947. Its original call sign was WFMZ and it was owned by Penn-Allen Broadcasting, with studios on Linden Street. On November 1, 1947, it moved from 105.1 MHz to 95.9 MHz concurrent with an increase in power to 1 kW. WFMZ was an unusual stand-alone FM station in an era when most were co-owned with an AM station or newspaper for financial support. Few people owned FM receivers then.

The station originally played classical and jazz music for a few hours a day. Following this, in the 1950s, the station began playing blocks of soft instrumental music as well. In 1965, the station was sold to a local Christian group called Maranatha Broadcasting. At that point, WFMZ flipped to a Christian radio and easy listening format. For several hours daily, the station sold blocks of time to churches. The rest of the day was filled with only instrumental easy listening music known as beautiful music. The station initially played no vocalists.

==== Beautiful music ====
In the 1970s, WFMZ began cutting back the religious programming to very early mornings, middays and late evenings, replacing it with more easy listening music. By the mid-1970s, the station added some soft vocals by standards and adult contemporary artists, at first one or two per hour. In 1976, Maranatha signed on a television station on channel 69, WFMZ-TV. (A previous owner of the radio station operated an earlier WFMZ-TV on channel 67 in the 1950s.) The television station ran mostly religious shows along with about six hours a day of classic sitcoms and dramas.

In the 1980s, WFMZ continued with the beautiful music format cutting the religious shows down to a couple hours a day at most. A boost in the ratings occurred when WQQQ dropped easy listening for Top 40 in April 1983. WFMZ began gradually mixing in more vocalists and eased up on the instrumentals. By 1990, the playlist was about half vocal and half instrumental. In 1991, the station overhauled the format and dropped most of the standards artists, focusing on soft hits from popular AC and CHR artists. The station was now mostly vocal with an instrumental each hour. By 1994, WFMZ evolved completely into a soft adult contemporary format.

==== Citadel Broadcasting ====
Maranatha put WFMZ radio up for sale in 1996. Citadel Broadcasting, a forerunner to today's Cumulus Media, was the owner of rival adult contemporary station WLEV (96.1 FM). Citadel bought WFMZ late that year. The rumor was that Citadel would flip WFMZ to country music. Initially, Citadel retained both stations' AC formats, with WFMZ being softer and WLEV being more upbeat.

In the summer of 1997, Citadel management determined that the Allentown radio market only needed one adult contemporary station, while a country station was also needed. That July, WLEV (96.1 FM) became WCTO, playing country music as "Cat Country 96". Half of the WLEV airstaff remained on 96.1 and several new DJs were hired to carry out the country format.

WFMZ had only a few air personalities and was mostly automated. The WLEV staffers who did not stay on WCTO moved to fill daytime hours on 100.7. The intellectual properties of WLEV and WFMZ were combined onto 100.7, under the WLEV call sign. The sound was not as soft, moving to mainstream adult contemporary music, with WFMZ's religious programming being dropped. The syndicated Delilah love songs and request show was added in the 7 p.m. to midnight time slot. Citadel's 1400 WEST was sold to Maranatha Broadcasting.

=== WLEV intellectual unit ===
WLEV came on the air in 1947 as WEST-FM. It began on 107.9 MHz but moved to 96.1 a few years later. For decades, WEST-AM-FM would simulcast a middle of the road format of popular music, news, sports and talk.

In 1973, 96.1 became WLEV (for "Lehigh Valley"). It had an automated soft rock and soft hits format that played adult pop songs of the 1960s and 1970s along with current product. The station used the syndicated "Hit Parade" service. Pre-recorded voices announced the song titles and artists. WLEV was owned by Sound Media and then by Telemedia Group.

In the 1980s, WLEV added live DJs and continued as a personality adult contemporary station with no dramatic changes. By the 1990s, the station added more uptempo hits, bordering on being a hot AC, though the texture of the station remained consistent.

In 1995, the station was sold, along with WEST, to Citadel Broadcasting; the adult contemporary format on 96.1 continued until the consolidation with WFMZ and launch of WCTO's country music format in 1997.

WLEV competes today with 101.1 WBEB in Philadelphia for adult contemporary listeners. Citadel merged with Cumulus Media on September 16, 2011.

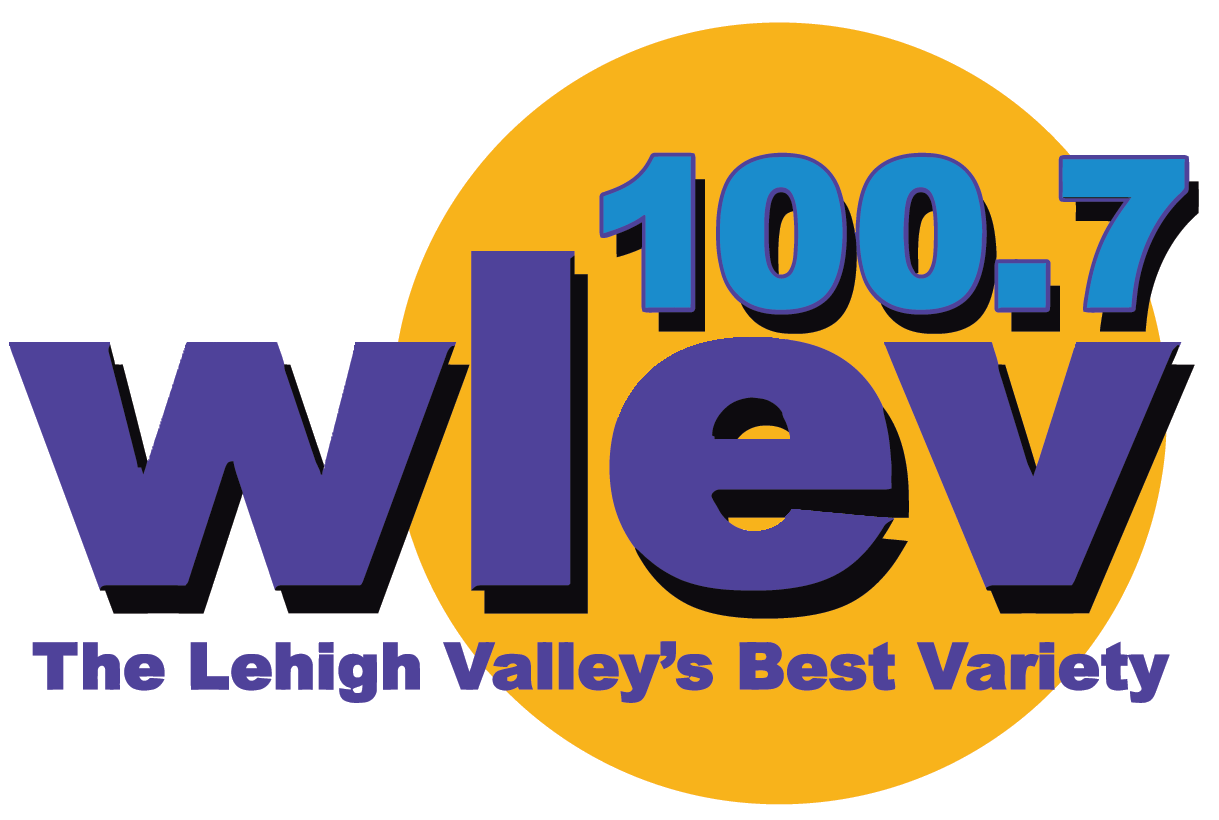
Logo under former slogan

== Signal note ==
WLEV is short-spaced to three other Class B stations operating on 100.7 MHz: WHUD in Peekskill, New York; WLVX in Westminster, Maryland; and WZXL in Wildwood, New Jersey.

The distance between WLEV's transmitter and WHUD's transmitter is only 97 miles (156 km). The distance between WLEV's transmitter and WLVX's transmitter is only 105 miles (169 km). The distance between WLEV's transmitter and WZXL's transmitter is only 106 miles (171 km), as determined by Federal Communications Commission (FCC) rules. The minimum distance between two Class B stations operating on the same channel according to current FCC rules is 150 miles (240 km).

== HD programming and translators ==
An FM translator fed by WLEV-HD2, W257DI, began broadcasting a rhythmic contemporary format in Reading on August 18, 2017. It was called "Loud 99.3" and was branded as "Reading's Hip Hop Station". On January 17, 2022, Loud 99.3 moved to 98.5 FM and is no longer fed by WLEV.

Currently, WLEV-HD2 feeds an FM translator at 92.9 in Reading, W225CF. It airs a Spanish contemporary hits format known as "Mega 92.9".

Broadcast translator for WLEV-HD2
Call sign	Frequency	City of license	FID	ERP (W)	Class	Transmitter coordinates	FCC info
W225CF	92.9 FM	Reading, Pennsylvania	155464	99	D	40°21′15.3″N 75°53′53.7″W	LMS

== See also ==
- Media in the Lehigh Valley
