= WCTO =

Radio station in Easton, Pennsylvania

- Easton, Pennsylvania; United States
- Broadcast area: Lehigh Valley
- Frequency: 96.1 MHz
- Branding: Cat Country 96 & 107

Programming
- Format: Country music
- Affiliations: Compass Media Networks; Westwood One; Philadelphia Eagles Radio Network

Ownership
- Owner: Cumulus Media; (Radio License Holding CBC, LLC)
- Sister stations: WEEX; WLEV; WWYY; WODE-FM

History
- First air date: 1947
- Former call signs: WEST-FM (1947–1973); WLEV (1973–1997)
- Call sign meaning: Cat Country

Technical information
- Licensing authority: FCC
- Facility ID: 36997
- Class: B
- ERP: 50,000 watts
- HAAT: 152 meters
- Transmitter coordinates: 40°35′54.5″N 75°25′11.9″W
- Repeater: 107.1 WWYY (Belvidere, New Jersey)

Links
- Public license information: Public file; LMS
- Webcast: Listen live
- Website: www.catcountry96.com

WCTO (96.1 FM, "Cat Country 96 & 107") is a radio station licensed to Easton, Pennsylvania. The station is owned by Cumulus Media and serves the Lehigh Valley region of Pennsylvania. Cat Country 96.1 is simulcast on 107.1 WWYY in Belvidere, New Jersey, to cover western New Jersey and the Poconos in Northeastern Pennsylvania,

The station offers a country music format, playing country music from the 1980s through to the present, and is part of the Philadelphia Eagles radio network.

== History ==
They began in 1947 as WEST-FM, the FM sister station to WEST (1400 AM). For decades, the station simulcast WEST's middle of the road popular music format. In 1973, 96.1 became WLEV and began offering a soft rock/adult contemporary format that was very automated. It played the softer rock hits of the 1960s and 1970s, along with a lot of current music. It was known as "Hit Parade Music" at one point. The station was owned by Sound Media and then by Telemedia Group.

Through the 1970s and into the 1980s, WLEV continued as an adult contemporary station with no dramatic changes. More personality was added in the late 1980s and, by the 1990s, the station bordered on being a hot adult contemporary station, but the texture of the station was consistent.

In 1995, the station was sold, along with WEST, to Citadel Broadcasting. In 1997, Citadel acquired WFMZ (100.7 FM), which by then had a format that was evolving to be musically closer to WLEV. In 1997, it was decided that there was no need for two AC stations in the Lehigh Valley, so Citadel combined aspects of the AC formats from both stations and moved the WLEV call letters and format and some of the air staff to 100.7 that July.

The 96.1 facility became Cat Country WCTO and played a country music format. As a country music station, the station achieves some very high ratings. It has a live air staff almost full-time and focuses on country hits of the 1980s, 1990s and current music. Citadel merged with Cumulus Media on September 16, 2011.

== Jingles and sweepers ==
From the beginning of 2000, WCTO used Reelworld custom packages, and continues to do so. Starting on May 17, 2009, the station dropped all RW packages minus their 06 package, and started to broadcast a brand new jingle service at that time, Reelworld One Country. Since January 1, 2011, the station uses the entire back service which includes the entire back catalog.

Sweeper wise, the station started to use John Willyard with a little help from the late Billy Moore for the launch in 1997, and still uses him to this day.

== See also ==
- Media in the Lehigh Valley
