= WPAM =

- Pottsville, Pennsylvania; United States
- Frequency: 1450 kHz

Programming
- Format: Oldies

Ownership
- Owner: Curran Communications

History
- First air date: 1946
- Last air date: July 23, 2015

Technical information
- Facility ID: 14741
- Class: C
- Power: 1,000 watts unlimited
- Transmitter coordinates: 40°41′27″N 76°11′39″W

WPAM (1450 AM) was a radio station licensed to Pottsville, Pennsylvania, United States. Studios and transmitters were atop Lawton's Hill. Established in 1946, the station was owned by Curran Communications.

On May 17, 2017, the Federal Communications Commission informed WPAM that, as the station had been silent since at least July 23, 2015, it was in the process of cancelling the station's license; the license was canceled on June 29, 2017.
