= The Express-Times =

Newspaper based in Easton, Pennsylvania

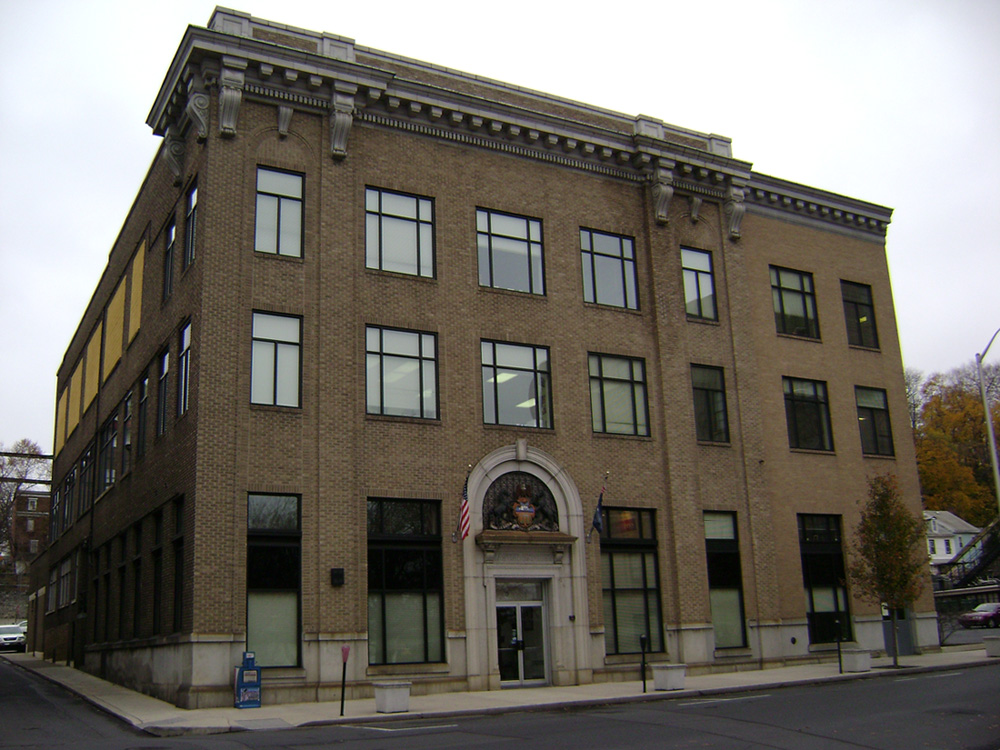
- The Express-Times building in Easton, Pennsylvania in November 2009
- Type: Daily newspaper
- Format: Broadsheet
- Owner: Advance Publications
- President: Steve Alessi
- Editor: Nick Falsone
- Founded: 1855 as The Easton Daily Express
- Language: English
- Headquarters: 18 Centre Square, Easton, Pennsylvania, U.S.
- Website: lehighvalleylive.com

Founded in 1855, The Express-Times began as The Easton Daily Express, a daily newspaper based in Easton, Pennsylvania. The newspaper provided national news and extensive local news coverage of the Lehigh Valley region of eastern Pennsylvania. The Express-Times was the longest continuously published newspaper in the Lehigh Valley and one of the longest continuously published newspapers in the nation.

The paper won awards in New Jersey and Pennsylvania. In 2021, the newspaper was awarded a Toner Prize for Excellence in Political Reporting.

== History ==
=== 19th century ===
The Express-Times was founded in 1855 as The Easton Daily Express.

=== 20th century ===
In 1917, the newspaper's name was changed to The Easton Express and was later abbreviated to The Express in 1973.

In 1983, Thomson Newspapers bought The Express. In 1991, The Express merged with The Globe-Times, which was based in Bethlehem, PA, which formed The Express-Times. In 1994, MediaNews Group acquired The Express-Times from Thomson.

=== 21st century ===
In 2000, current owner Advance Publications bought MediaNews's New Jersey and Pennsylvania-based newspapers, including The Express-Times.

In 2023, The Express-Times joined the region's other major newspaper, The Morning Call, in dropping their circulation of the Dilbert comic after Scott Adams, the comic's creator, told white people to "get the hell away from [black people]" on a YouTube live stream in response to a public opinion poll by the conservative-leaning Rasmussen Reports, which found that 26% of Black respondents disagreed with the statement that "it's okay to be white."

The Express-Times discontinued its print edition in February 2025.

== Distribution ==
The Express–Times published zoned editions in the Lehigh Valley and New Jersey. It delivered to Lehigh and Northampton Counties in Pennsylvania and Warren and Hunterdon Counties in northwest New Jersey.

== Sections ==
The Express-Times had four editorial sections:

- Front: Local, national and world news
- Valley: Local news and obituaries from the Lehigh Valley
- Sports: Local and national sports
- Today: Local and national arts and entertainment
- Editorials, classifieds, comics, horoscopes, and puzzles also appear daily.

== Inserts ==
The following were inserted into The Express-Times during the week:

- Friday: Exposed, an entertainment tabloid
- Saturday: Real Estate, a real estate guide
- Sunday: Sunday Morning, a features section, including news from The Wall Street Journal, and full color comics.

== Other publications ==
The Express-Times also published a weekly paper, The US, based in Nazareth, Pennsylvania.

== See also ==
- Media in the Lehigh Valley
