= Kenneth Smith =

Kenneth, Kenny, or Ken Smith may refer to:

== Sports ==
=== Baseball ===
- Ken Smith (baseball) (born 1958), former Major League Baseball player
- Kenneth Smith (baseball), played baseball at the 1956 Summer Olympics

=== Basketball ===
- Ken Smith (basketball, born 1953), American professional basketball player for the San Antonio Spurs
- Kenny Smith (born 1965), American basketball player and announcer
- Speedy Smith (born 1993), American college basketball player for the Louisiana Tech Bulldogs

=== Football ===
- Ken Smith (footballer, born 1927) (1927–2018), English footballer who played as an inside forward
- Ken Smith (footballer, born 1932) (1932–2011), English footballer who played as a centre forward

=== Other sports ===
- Ken Smith (tight end) (born 1951), American football player
- Ken Smith (offensive guard) (born 1960), American football player
- Kenny Smith (arena football), Arena football player for the 2007 Austin Wranglers
- Ken Smith (racing driver) (born 1941), New Zealand motor racing driver
- Ken Smith (rugby union) (1929–2026), Scottish international rugby player
- Ken Smith (sportswriter) (1902–1991), American sportswriter
- Kenneth Smith (cricketer) (1922–1998), English cricketer
- Kenneth Smith (sailor), competed in 1960 Star World Championships
- Kenneth Smith (swimmer), competed in 2006 FINA World Open Water Swimming Championships – Men's 10K
- Kenny Smith (American football) (born 1977), American football player
- Kenny Smith (ice hockey) (1924–2000), ice hockey player
- Kenny Smith (rugby union), Irish rugby union player

== Politicians ==
- Ken Smith (American politician) (born 1926), American former politician in the state of Florida
- Ken Smith (Australian politician) (born 1944), Australian member of the Victorian Legislative Assembly
- Kenneth J. Smith (born 1961), Pennsylvania politician
- Kenneth Smith (mayor), Mayor of Bethlehem, Pennsylvania from 1988 to 1997
- Kenny Smith (far-right activist) (born 1972/1973), Scottish political activist

== Music ==
- Ken Smith (songwriter), The Vagabond Lover
- Kenny Smith (bluegrass) (born 1967), American bluegrass musician of the Kenny & Amanda Smith Band

== Others ==
- Ken Smith (architect) (born 1953), American architect
- Ken Smith (chess player) (1930–1999), American chess player and author
- Ken Smith (hermit) (born 1947), known as the "hermit of Loch Treig"
- Ken Smith (Home and Away), character on the Australian soap opera Home and Away
- Ken Smith (poet) (1938–2003), British poet
- Kenneth B. Smith (1931–2008), Chicago-area community leader and minister
- Kenneth C. Smith (1932–2023), Canadian electrical engineering professor
- Kenneth F. Smith, special effects artist
- Kenneth L. Smith, civil engineer for the National Park Service
- Kenneth Smith (British Army soldier) (1920–1945), recipient of the George Cross
- Kenneth Eugene Smith (1965–2024), American criminal and the first person to be executed by nitrogen hypoxia
- Kenneth Manley Smith (1892–1981), British entomologist, phytopathologist, and virologist

== See also ==
- Kenneth Smyth (disambiguation)
