= 2013 Northampton County Executive election =

- November 5, 2013

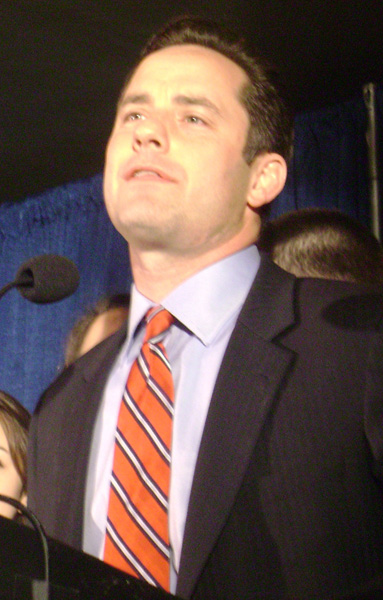
Nominee	John Brown	John B. Callahan
Party	Republican	Democratic
Popular vote	18,969	17,675
Percentage	51.73%	48.20%
County Executive before election
John Stoffa
Democratic
Elected County Executive
John Brown
Republican

The 2013 Northampton County Executive election was held on November 5, 2013. Incumbent Democratic County Executive John Stoffa declined to run for a third term. Bethlehem Mayor John B. Callahan won the Democratic primary over former County Executive Glenn Reibman, whom Stoffa defeated in 2005, and County Councilman Lamont McClure, with 50 percent of the vote. In the general election, he faced Bangor Mayor John Brown, the Republican nominee. Despite Brown's lower name recognition, he defeated Callahan in an upset, winning the election with 52 percent of the vote.

== Democratic primary ==
=== Candidates ===
- John B. Callahan, Mayor of Bethlehem, 2010 Democratic nominee for Pennsylvania's 15th congressional district
- Glenn Reibman, former County Executive
- Lamont McClure, County Councilman

=== Results ===
Democratic primary results
Party	Candidate	Votes	%
Democratic	John Callahan	6,874	50.16%
Democratic	Glenn Reibman	3,861	28.17%
Democratic	Lamont McClure	2,954	21.55%
Democratic	Write-ins	16	0.12%
Total votes		13,705	100.00%

== Republican primary ==
=== Candidates ===
- John Brown, Mayor of Bangor

=== Results ===
Republican primary results
Party	Candidate	Votes	%
Republican	John Brown	5,642	98.71%
Republican	Write-ins	574	1.29%
Total votes		5,716	100.00%

== General election ==
=== Results ===
2013 Northampton County Executive election
Party	Candidate	Votes	%
Republican	John Brown	18,969	51.73%
Democratic	John B. Callahan	17,675	48.20%
Write-in		27	0.07%
Total votes		36,671	100.00%
Republican gain from Democratic			
