= Edward Boscola =

American politician

Bethlehem Director of Water and Sewer Resources
- Incumbent
- Assumed office January 6, 2014
- Preceded by: David Brong

Northampton County Director of Public Works
- In office 1999–2006
- Preceded by: John Giesen
- Succeeded by: Steven DeSalva

Personal details
- Party: Democratic
- Spouse: Lisa Boscola
- Education: Villanova University
- Occupation: Systems engineer

Edward "Ed" Boscola is an American politician from the Lehigh Valley serving in various county and municipal offices. He is married to State Senator Lisa Boscola.

== Early life and education ==
Boscola attended Villanova University earning a Master's degree in Mechanical Engineering. He met his wife, Lisa, at Villanova. Boscola worked as a systems engineer at PECO Energy Company's Limerick Generating Station from 1984 to 1995.

== Career ==
Following his wife's election to the state senate in 1999, Boscola suddenly shifted his career to politics. In 1999, despite having no prior knowledge in the field, Northampton County executive, Glenn Reibman (D), personally nominated him to be his director of public works. Boscola beat out three other candidates to be appointed to the position unanimously by the county council, mostly due to his engineering degree, becoming the first director to have a technical degree. Boscola's appointment was opposed by his predecessor, John Giesen, who controversially had proposed restoring chain gangs in the county. Giesen and Darin Stofko, Lisa's brother and a local perennial candidate charged with aggravated assault in 1985, attended Boscola's appointment meeting to oppose him. Giesen pointed out Boscola's lack of experience in the field, and called his appointment “political patronage of the highest sort”. Stofko accused council members of playing golf with Boscola prior to his appointment and for accepting money from his sister's campaign before tossing a sweater with the senate seal at Boscola and leaving.

As director, Boscola was in charge of who received county contracts, resulting in scrutiny in 2000 by county councilmen Ron Angle (R) when he awarded contracts to a firm owned by his close personal friend LeRoy Lieberman, the husband of councilwoman Marilyn Lieberman (D). In response, Marilyn accused Angle of making sexist remarks towards her and fellow councilwoman Carol Cuono (D). Angle responded by saying the accusations of sexism were a shoddy attempt to deflect his accusation of corruption against Mrs. Lieberman and Mr. Boscola. Boscola invalidated the contract and awarded it to another firm.

Boscola resigned as director in 2006, shortly after Reibman lost his primary to conservative Democrat John Stoffa (D) to take a job at Brinjac Engineering in Philadelphia, though the resignation came shortly after his authority was transferred to Stoffa, who saw several other department directors be fired and also shortly after a lawsuit against the county for unpaid wages to a contracting firm on a project Boscola headed. His notice of resignation left the county scrambling to find a replacement, however, Boscola received praise from both Stoffa and Reibman for his work as director.

Boscola worked at Brinjac until 2014 when Bethlehem mayor Robert Donchez (D) appointed him to his Technocratic cabinet as Director of Water and Sewer Resources replacing David Brong who would be named the city’s business administrator. This came despite Edward having no prior experience in water treatment or sewers.

As director, Boscola's most prominent role would be addressing the public after something goes wrong with the city's sewer and water treatment system. Some notable examples of problems with the city's water and sewage system include when a PPL Corporation truck falling into a 15-foot sinkhole caused by a water main bursting in 2014. In 2016 the city's hot water supply stripped sediment from the city's pipes resulting in the entire city's water being cloudy and deemed a public health risk.

In 2017, another sinkhole opened due to a water main burst, this time in downtown Bethlehem, shutting down portions of the city for weeks for repairs. In 2022, while working on the demolition of the historic Boyd theater, workers struck a service line resulting not only in the flooding of several downtown businesses, but also contamination of most of the downtown's water supply. Additionally, in 2022, the Lehigh Valley was placed under "Drought watch" due to lack of rain that summer and Boscola requested citizens reduce their water consumption by 10%.

In 2020, Boscola stated that the costs of running the city's water system for the next decade are estimated to be $49,000,000, and recommended an 11% rate hike on consumers water bills in 2021. This came just months after the city council hiked the water rate 8%.

In March 2022, Boscola oversaw the city's $2,587,000 project to dig up and replace the remaining 300 to 350 lead service lines. Boscola would survive a regime change after the election of J. William Reynolds (D) who retained him in his cabinet.
