= 2013 Lehigh County Executive election =

- November 5, 2013

Nominee	Tom Muller	Scott Ott
Party	Democratic	Republican
Popular vote	23,413	21,862
Percentage	51.71%	48.29%
County Executive before election
Matt Croslis
Democratic
Elected County Executive
Tom Muller
Democratic

The 2013 Lehigh County Executive election was held on November 5, 2013. In 2012, County Executive Don Cunningham resigned and former County Commissioner Bill Hansell was appointed to serve out the remainder of his term. Muller declined to run in the regular election, and Tom Muller, the County Director of Administration, ran for the Democratic nomination to succeed Hansell. On May 17, 2013, Hansell himself resigned after being diagnosed with cancer, and appointed Muller as acting Executive. The County Commission ultimately selected Matt Croslis to serve as County Executive until the election concluded.

Muller won the Democratic primary unopposed, and County Commissioner Scott Ott, the 2009 Republican nominee, won the Republican nomination over former County Commissioner Dean Browning. In the general election, Muller, a former Republican, campaigned on his experience and attacked Ott as ideologically extreme. Muller ultimately defeated tot by a narrow margin, winning 52 percent of the vote to Ott's 48 percent.

== Democratic primary ==
=== Candidates ===
- Tom Muller, County Director of Administration, former acting County Executive

=== Results ===
Democratic primary results
Party	Candidate	Votes	%
Democratic	Tom Muller	8,595	100.00%
Total votes		8,595	100.00%

== Republican primary ==
=== Candidates ===
- Scott Ott, County Commissioner, 2009 Republican nominee for County Executive
- Dean Browning, former County Commissioner

=== Results ===
Republican primary results
Party	Candidate	Votes	%
Republican	Scott Ott	6,880	55.80%
Republican	Dean Browning	5,449	100.00%
Total votes		12,329	100.00%

== General election ==
=== Results ===
2013 Lehigh County Executive election
Party	Candidate	Votes	%
Democratic	Tom Muller	23,413	51.71%
Republican	Scott Ott	21,862	48.29%
Total votes		45,275	100.00%
Democratic hold			
