= Gordon Mowrer =

American politician, businessman and ordained pastor

Mayor Gordon Mowrer

6th Mayor of Bethlehem, Pennsylvania
- In office 1974–1978
- Preceded by: H. Gordon Payrow, Jr.
- Succeeded by: Paul Marcincin

Interim Mayor of Bethlehem, Pennsylvania
- In office January 5, 1987 – 1987
- Preceded by: Paul Marcincin
- Succeeded by: Kenneth Smith

Personal details
- Born: February 9, 1936
- Died: July 19, 2016 (aged 80) Bethlehem, Pennsylvania
- Party: Democratic
- Spouse: Mary Thaeler
- Children: 3
- Education: Dickinson College

Gordon Brown Mowrer (February 9, 1936 – July 19, 2016) was an American politician, businessman, and ordained pastor of the Moravian Church, who served as the mayor of Bethlehem, Pennsylvania, from 1974 to 1978, and again as interim mayor in 1987. Mowrer, who was 36-years old when he took office for his first term in 1974, became the youngest mayor in Bethlehem's history at the time. Mowrer's record as the city's youngest mayor held until Mayor Don Cunningham was sworn in 1998 at the age of 31.

Nicknamed "Main Street Mayor", Mowrer is credited with the preservation of Bethlehem's historic downtown business district, which has now become a major tourist attraction for the city. During the 1970s, Mowrer eschewed the trend of demolishing older commercial buildings in favor of preserving Bethlehem's older structures. More recently, Mowrer, who returned to the Bethlehem city council in the 2000s, opposed the opening of a casino in Bethlehem following the legalization of slot machines by the government of Pennsylvania. Despite Mowrer's opposition, the casino was approved and the Sands Casino Resort Bethlehem opened in 2009.

== Biography ==
=== Early and personal life ===
Gordon Mowrer, the younger of two sons, was born in 1936 to Clifton and Margaret Mowrer. His father, Clifton, owned Mowrer's Dairy, a Bethlehem dairy farm. In 1929, Clifton Mowrer opened The Cup, which the family later sold. The Cup became a landmark ice cream parlor in the city.

Mowrer enrolled at Dickinson College, but dropped out after a series of poor grades, which he attributed to too much time at fraternity parties. He enlisted in the United States Navy, which he credited with refocusing his life and work ethic. Mowrer re-enrolled at Dickinson College two years after leaving the school and soon earned a 3.5 G.P.A. and joined the wrestling team. He earned his bachelor's degree from Dickinson and found a job in the insurance industry.

In 1960, Mowrer met his future wife, the former Mary Thaeler, a grad student and daughter of missionaries of the Moravian Church, on a blind date. However, Mary Thaeler was already engaged to another man at the time of their meeting. Mowrer successfully convinced Thaeler that she should choose him instead. Gordon and Mary Mowrer married at a ceremony in Nicaragua on December 29, 1960. They had three children, George, Ruthie and Meg.

=== Career ===
Mowrer began his political career by being elected to the Bethlehem city council during the 1960s. He was elected mayor in 1973 and sworn into office in 1974 at the age of 37, becoming the youngest mayor in the city's history at the time.

Mayor Gordon Mowrer has been credited with the preservation of Bethlehem's historic downtown shopping district and its buildings. During his tenure, Mowrer reversed a prevailing urban renewal trend in which older buildings were demolished and replaced with modern, 1970s era structures. Mayor Mowrer planned and installed slate sidewalks and Victorian-style street lights On Main Street to match of the architectural style of the existing historic buildings in downtown. The improvements to the streetscape prompted store owners and property owners to renovate their storefronts, creating a neighborhood which was more attractive to businesses and investors. Mowrer's commitment to the historic preservation of the city's downtown earned him the nickname, "Main Street Mayor." Downtown Bethlehem has grown into a major tourist and visitors attraction, a development which had been widely credited to Mowrer's efforts to preserve the neighborhood during the 1970s.

Mowrer was seen as such a successful mayor that the Bethlehem city council, believing that he might govern the city for decades, passed a term limit law which limited Mower and his successors to two consecutive, four-year terms in office. However, the popular mayor was defeated for re-election in the 1977 mayoral primary by Paul Marcincin, a fellow Democrat, in a stunning political upset. He left office in 1978.

Mowrer went back to college after his defeat and earned a master's degree in pastoral counseling. In 1992, he was ordained a pastor by the Moravian Church. He worked as a part-time chaplain at St. Luke's Hospital in Bethlehem for 28 years and held Young Life meeting, a nondenominational Christian ministry, at his home. (Future Bethlehem Mayor John B. Callahan met his wife, Mafalda, at Mowrer's Young Life gatherings). Additionally, Mowrer was a member of the board of directors for the Bethlehem chapter of the YMCA.

Bethlehem city officials honored Mowrer with a plaque engraved with "Main Street Mayor" in February 2013.

Mowrer made his last public appearance on June 25, 2016, attending the Bethlehem 275th anniversary celebration at SteelStacks. Mowrer was suffering from Parkinson's disease, but according to former Mayor John Callahan, as past Mayors of Bethlehem were being introduced, "His back straightened, and his chin went up. His face brightened. The crowd was cheering for him. I watched him become Gordon Mowrer. It was an amazing moment."

Gordon Mowrer died on July 19, 2016, of complications of Parkinson's disease at the Moravian Village nursing home in Bethlehem at the age of 80. He had been in hospice care for the previous week and a half.
