= Robert Pfeifle =

American politician (1880-1958)

Mayor Robert Pfeifle

3rd Mayor of Bethlehem, Pennsylvania
- In office 1930–1950
- Preceded by: James Yeakel
- Succeeded by: Earl E. Schaffer

Bethlehem City Council

Personal details
- Born: April 14, 1880 Almont, Pennsylvania, U.S.
- Died: 1958 (aged 78) Bethlehem, Pennsylvania, U.S.
- Party: Democratic Party
- Spouse: Gertrude Pfeifle (née Heller)
- Children: 4
- Occupation: Carpenter, general contractor, politician

Robert Pfeifle (1880–1958) was an American politician who served as mayor of the City of Bethlehem, Pennsylvania for five terms between 1930 and 1950. A Democrat, Pfeifle led the city through the Great Depression and World War II.

A biography of Pfeifle, Dare to be Brave, was published posthumously in 1977; it was co-written by his granddaughter, Jean Pfeifle McQuade, and a retired reporter, Frank Orpe.

== Early life and education ==
Pfeifle was born on April 14, 1880, on a farm in Almont, Pennsylvania (a former crossroads village in what was then farm country, near Sellersville). His parents were Franklin (Frank) and Catherine (Headman) Pfeifle, of Pennsylvania Dutch ancestry. The family moved in the 1880s, and Bob's primary-school education was at Lansdale. The family moved to Philadelphia when Pfeifle was 12 years old. He served his apprenticeship as a blacksmith there in the 1890s. He did not like the blacksmith trade, but because his father insisted, he finished the apprenticeship; afterward, from 1899, he left that trade and took up the one he preferred, carpentry, in which he remained for decades afterward. As a young man he took up the harmonica, tap dancing, and amateur theatre. McQuade and Orpe said, "He took up boxing, and became a competent amateur, but gave up the ring, he said later, after he got "clobbered."

== Career ==
In 1902, he moved to Bethlehem, Pennsylvania, where he continued to work as a carpenter. In 1905 he both married Gertrude E. Heller and started his self-employment. After some years of handyman-type work and running a small planing mill, his business grew into a general contracting firm.

His firm remained successful for years afterward and established him with a comfortable standard of living; although he was not a millionaire and his Church Dutch moral standards did not include idolizing wealth, he built for himself and his family a large house on Webster Street with fine masonry and carpentry, and he was well-off in the 1920s. He served as the director of the Bethlehem National Bank from 1915 to 1928, and in 1929 (before the crash) he was its principal stockholder. He was also the director of the Lehigh Valley Cold Storage Company from 1910 to 1928. McQuade and Orpe list various companies of which he was president or a director in the 1920s. He belonged to various business and service organizations and clubs.

He retired from his construction business in 1929 after a quarter-century of self-employment working on more than 600 buildings, including both residential and commercial structures. He was long a trustee of his church, the First Moravian Church, part of the Moravian Church in North America.

Pfeifle was elected to the Bethlehem city council, serving from 1916 to 1928. During his time as councilman the city went through first World War I and then the Roaring Twenties, which hit the city especially hard socially. During the 1920s, the south side of Bethlehem grew notorious for its increasing criminal elements, developing a reputation as a weekend retreat for New Yorkers to commit vices such as drinking, gambling and prostitution. On November 12, 1927, officer Charles Fenton was shot and killed attempting to apprehend a robbery suspect from one of the south side's 35 brothels. His death sparked massive outcry for the city government to step in and restore law and order.

=== Mayor of Bethlehem ===
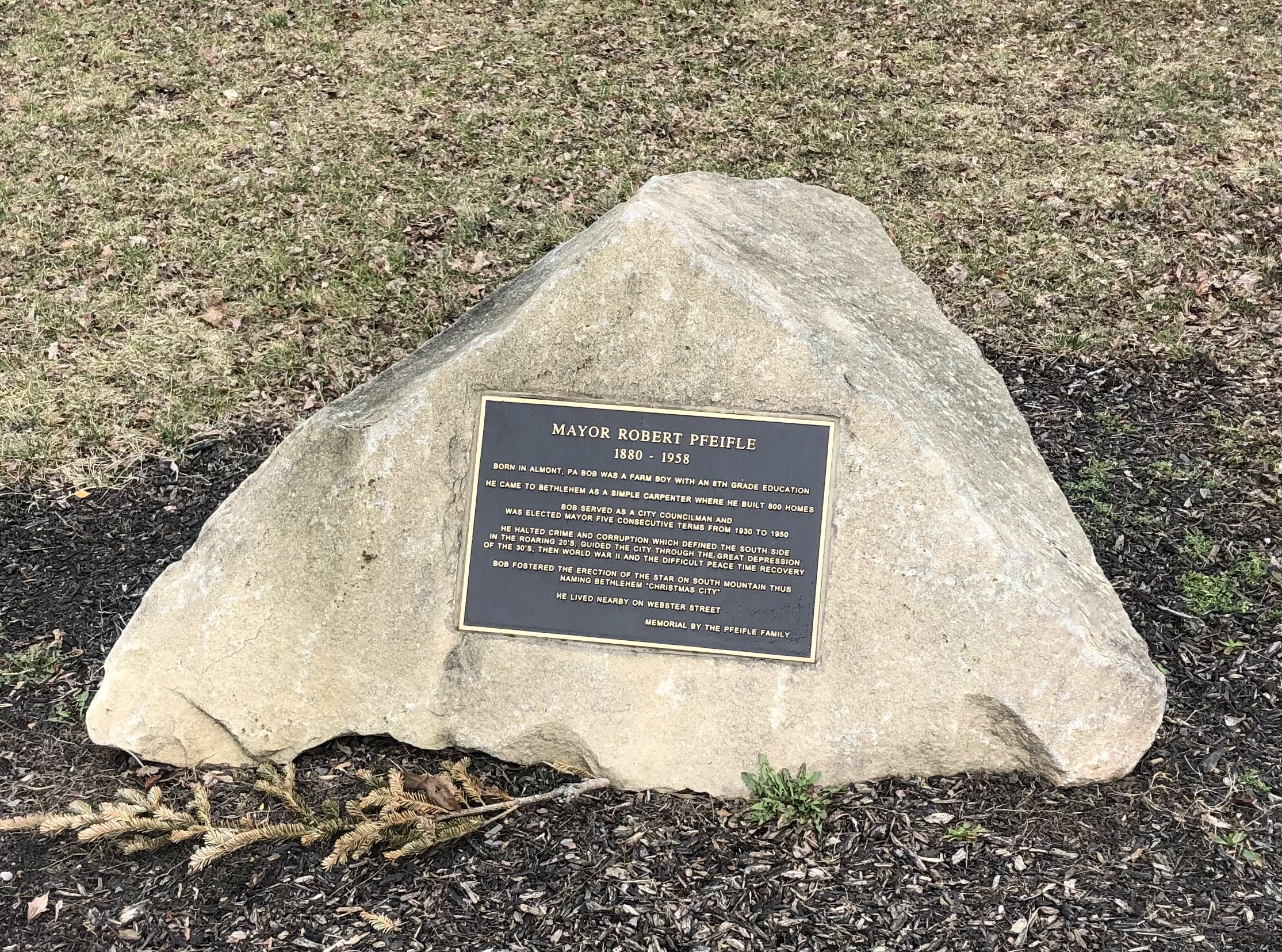
Pfeifle's memorial stone in Southside Bethlehem

Amid suggestions from friends and allies, Pfeifle decided to run for mayor in 1929 on a campaign of eliminating crime and corruption within the city. Once he took office (in 1930), he immediately set himself on shaking the city's perception as a weekend retreat for New Yorkers to commit vices such as drinking, gambling and prostitution. In collaboration with the Secret Service, mayor Pfeifle launched a series of raids within six months of taking office that shut down the brothels and destroyed every known moonshine still.

Pfeifle led the city through the Great Depression, during which he personally traveled to Washington D.C. to petition the government for more Works Progress Administration jobs. Such work led to the construction of the Illicks Mill Park. He also personally mortgaged all his belongings in order to cover the withdrawals of Bethlehem citizens. He led the city during World War II, when Bethlehem Steel and countless other manufacturing firms contributed to the war effort.

As mayor, Pfeifle was known for a noticeable accent of Pennsylvania Dutch language in his English. His interest in boxing led to installing a boxing ring in the mayoral office for his personal use.

In 1939, Mayor Pfeifle erected a 60-ft lit-up star on South Mountain during the Christmas season, reinforcing the city's nickname as the "Christmas City".

== Personal life ==
Bob and Gert had 4 children, a son and three daughters.

== Posthumous recognition ==
A biography of Pfeifle, Dare to be Brave, was published posthumously in 1977, co-written by his granddaughter, Jean Pfeifle McQuade, and a retired reporter, Frank Orpe.

Almost immediately after his death in 1958, his house was purchased by a straw buyer for Lehigh University and was demolished to make way for the Sinclair Laboratory.

Many years later, in 2019, a plaque was installed, dedicated to his memory, near the site. The dedication ceremony was attended by local political leaders, including mayors Kenneth Smith and Don Cunningham and Pennsylvania State Representatives Jeanne McNeill and Steve Samuelson.
