= Donchez =

Donchez is a surname. Notable people with the surname include:

- Robert Donchez (born 1950), American politician
- Tom Donchez (1952–2024), American football player
