= 2005 Lehigh County Executive election =

- November 8, 2005
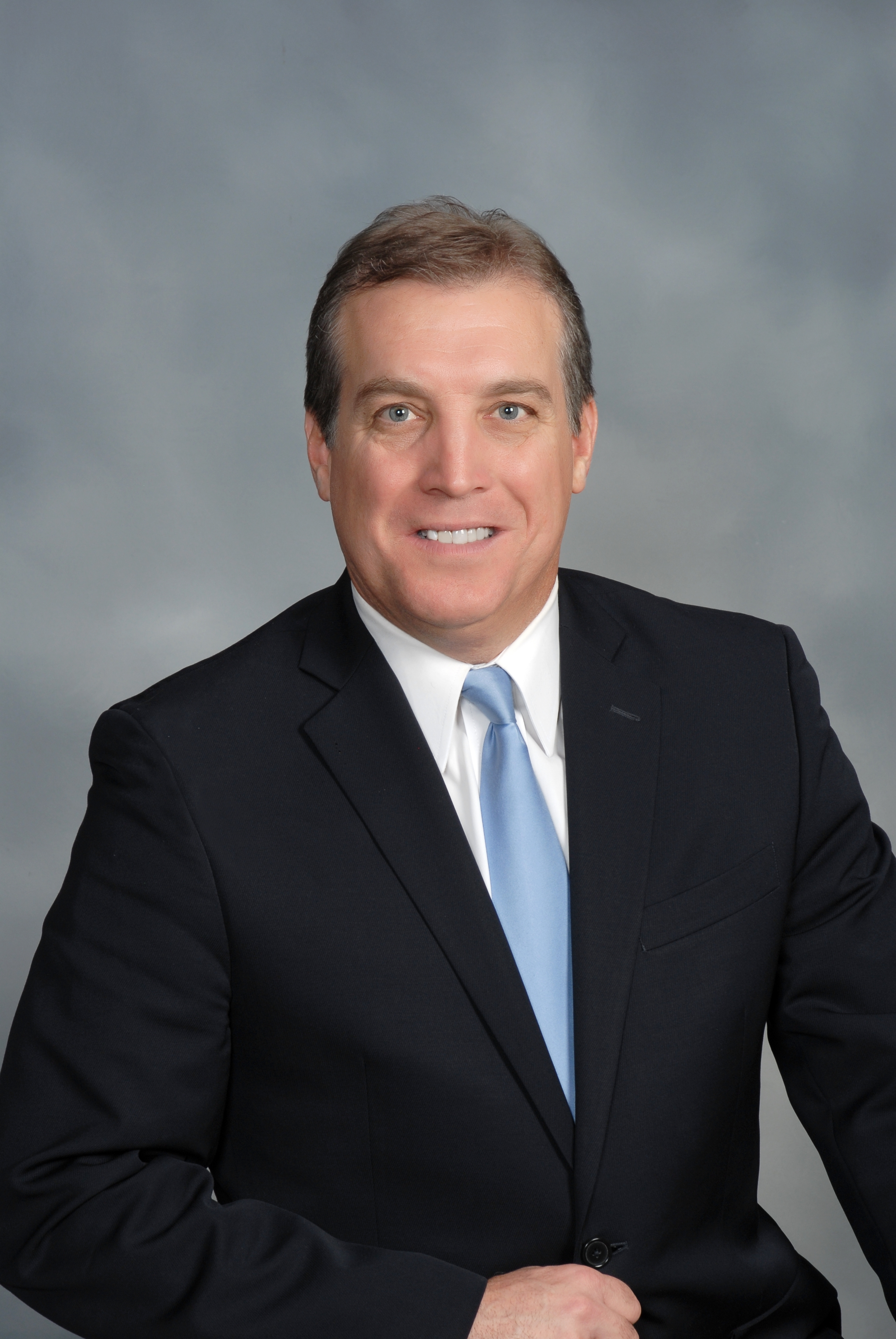

Nominee	Don Cunningham	Jane Ervin
Party	Democratic	Republican
Popular vote	33,263	20,721
Percentage	61.60%	38.37%
County Executive before election
Jane Ervin
Republican
Elected County Executive
Don Cunningham
Democratic

The 2005 Lehigh County Executive election was held on November 8, 2005. Incumbent Republican County Executive Jane Ervin ran for re-election to a second term. She narrowly defeated engineer Kevin Ryan in the Republican primary, winning 53-47 percent, and advanced to the general election, where she was opposed by former Bethlehem Mayor Don Cunningham, the Democratic nominee. Cunningham defeated Ervin in a landslide, winning 62 percent of the vote to Ervin's 38 percent, largely over voter frustration at a 70 percent property tax hike, enabling him to become the first Democratic County Executive in county history.

== Democratic primary ==
=== Candidates ===
- Don Cunningham, former Pennsylvania Secretary of General Services, former Mayor of Bethlehem

=== Results ===
Democratic primary results
Party	Candidate	Votes	%
Democratic	Don Cunningham	11,782	99.73%
Democratic	Write-ins	32	0.27%
Total votes		11,814	100.00%

== Republican primary ==
=== Candidates ===
- Jane Ervin, incumbent County Executive
- Kevin P. Ryan, consulting engineer, perennial candidate

==== Declined ====
- Andy Roman, County Commissioner

=== Results ===
Republican primary results
Party	Candidate	Votes	%
Republican	Jane Ervin (inc.)	7,104	53.13%
Republican	Kevin P. Ryan	6,260	46.82%
Republican	Write-ins	6	0.04%
Total votes		13,370	100.00%

== General election ==
=== Results ===
2005 Lehigh County Executive election
Party	Candidate	Votes	%
Democratic	Don Cunningham	33,263	61.60%
Republican	Jane Ervin (inc.)	20,721	38.37%
Write-in		14	0.03%
Total votes		53,998	100.00%
Democratic gain from Republican			
