= 2009 Northampton County Executive election =

- November 3, 2009
Nominee	John Stoffa
Party	Democratic
Popular vote	18,814
Percentage	99.57%
County Executive before election
John Stoffa
Democratic
Elected County Executive
John Stoffa
Democratic

The 2009 Northampton County Executive election was held on November 3, 2009. Incumbent Democratic County Executive John Stoffa ran for re-election to a second term. He was challenged in the Democratic primary by County Council President Ann McHale, and won renomination with 57 percent of the vote. Hoffa was originally set to face Republican nominee J. C. Kelleher, a former reporter, in the general election, but Kelleher withdrew from the race in June and the county Republican Party did not field a replacement. Stoffa ended up winning re-election in the general election unopposed.

== Democratic primary ==
=== Candidates ===
- John Stoffa, incumbent County Executive
- Ann McHale, County Council President

=== Results ===
Democratic primary results
Party	Candidate	Votes	%
Democratic	John Stoffa (inc.)	7,261	56.86%
Democratic	Ann McHale	5,507	43.13%
Democratic	Write-ins	1	0.01%
Total votes		12,769	100.00%

== Republican primary ==
=== Candidates ===
- J. C. Kelleher, former WFMZ-TV traffic anchor

=== Results ===
Republican primary results
Party	Candidate	Votes	%
Republican	J. C. Kelleher	5,958	98.99%
Republican	Write-ins	61	1.01%
Total votes		6,019	100.00%

=== Withdrawal ===
On June 18, 2009, Kelleher withdrew from the race, citing "some family issues that really, really require my attention." The Northampton County Republican Party began looking for other candidates, but did not aggressively recruit a candidate. Roy Shuman, the chairman of the party said, "The Republican Party is not terribly upset with John Stoffa; we just didn't want Ann McHale. If a Republican candidate steps forward, we'll help them, but I don't feel the need to go looking for one." At the November election, Republicans ended up sweeping all five county council seats and two county judicial seats, which Shuman said would have been more challenging if the party had named a replacement nominee and motivated Democrats to come out for the County Executive election.

== General election ==
=== Results ===
2009 Northampton County Executive election
Party	Candidate	Votes	%
Democratic	John Stoffa (inc.)	18,814	52.54%
Write-in		81	0.43%
Total votes		18,895	100.00%
Democratic hold			
