= Bethlehem Municipal Band =

The Bethlehem Municipal Band is an American concert band that has been in existence for 75 years based in Bethlehem, Pennsylvania. The band performs a variety of summer programs in the Bethlehem Rose Garden's Arts in the Park series, as well as selected other venues in the surrounding area.

== History ==
The Bethlehem Municipal Band was founded by Harry B.J. Hertwig and eight fellow musicians. Mr. Hertwig invited the musicians to a meeting to discuss the creation of a band that would be a creative outlet for young area musicians. Mr. Hertwig was looking to enlist recent graduates from Liberty High School who due to graduation were no longer playing with the high school band.

Unsuccessful at first, Mr. Hertwig and a few friends contacted civic groups and organizations trying to acquaint them with his idea. Mr Hertwig's perseverance paid off. On May 2, 1935, a group of ten interested musicians met at the home of Joseph Ricapito. Permission to use a room at the yard office of the Brown-Borhek Company was secured and the band's first rehearsal was held there on September 12, 1935. Twenty-four musicians attended this first rehearsal. That September, the band took formal shape with the election of officers. On October 20, 1935, the city council of Bethlehem unanimously agreed to support this new band. This group of thirty-six musicians became known as the "Municipal Band of the City of Bethlehem". City council also made provisions for use of the 3rd floor of the Municipal building on Market Street for rehearsals. The band swelled to fifty members and made its first public appearance at the President's Ball on January 30, 1936. Four summer concerts were played that year. In June 1937, the band purchased its first uniforms. The band played at the dedication of Illick's Mill Park that year. In 1938, the band made another appearance at the President's Ball. There were ten outdoor and two indoor concerts given by the band that year. Later that year on October 10, 1938, Harry Hertwig resigned from the band. The next ten years from 1939 to 1948, the band played an average of twelve to thirteen concerts a year. In 1939 the band began having annual banquets. World War II had its effect on the band causing the band membership in total to decline, but causing an increase in number of female members. Due to the war, the annual banquet was not held in 1943 or 1944. Between 1949 and 1961, the band played an average of 23 to 24 concerts a year. Beginning in 1962, due to budget cuts, the band was forced to reduce its concerts to 10 per year and playing at the annual fireworks display at Liberty High School. Also due to budget cuts, the annual banquet was cut in 1961. The band first played for the Christmas lighting ceremony in 1940. The band also played at the dedication of Memorial Pool in 1957. In 1959, a sign promoting the band's summer concerts made its debut on the Hill to Hill bridge. In 1972, the band began playing at the annual Christmas city fair.

== Meeting Places ==
The band has used a number of local sites for rehearsals. The original rehearsal facility was the yard office building of the Brown-Borhek Company. They remained there until 1947, when they moved to Liberty High School. In 1966, rehearsals were moved to the Municipal Golf course clubhouse, where they stayed until 1977. The years from 1977 to 1981 saw the band move rehearsal sites 5 times - from the Boys Club Northeast(1977) to the Naval reserve building on Rodger's Street(1977) to the Sears' Building on East Broad(1978) to the Bethlehem Redevelopment Authority (1979) to the Rosemont Lutheran church on West Broad Street.(1981–1982) to Trinity Lutheran Church on 3rd Avenue, where they currently rehearse.

In 1960, the city of Bethlehem purchased a mobile band shelter. In 1969, the Municipal band played a concert sponsored by the Seratoma Club of Bethlehem to raise funds to build a permanent band shell. The band shell was to be built in the Rose Garden at Eight Avenue in Bethlehem. The famed director, Alburtis Meyers was the guest conductor for that concert. The Band Shell construction was completed in 1982. The Band now plays their summer series of concerts at the Rose Garden band shell.

== Conductors ==
Over the band's 75-year history the band has had 5 directors. Joseph Ricapito, one of the band's founding members, was director for 30 years from 1935 until 1965, when he resigned. Mr. Ricapito died in November 1979. He was succeeded by the assistant band director, Ray Huston. Mr Huston was the director from 1965 until 1968. Mr. Huston is currently director of the American Legion Band of Bethlehem. He is their founder and only director since 1948. Bernard Beitel took up the baton for the next 21 years from 1968 until 1989. In 1989, Donald Kemmerer became the band's director. Donald conducted his last concert with the Municipal Band of the City of Bethlehem on December 17, 2025. That night, the band introduced their newest conductor: David J. Crosby. The band has had several guest conductors over the years, such notable names as Alburtis Meyers, Allbert Marchetto, Raymond Becker, and Ronald Sherry.

- 1935 to 1965: Joseph Ricapito
- 1965 to 1968: Ray Huston
- 1968 to 1989: Bernard Beitel
- 1989 to 2025: Donald Kemmerer (Director Emeritus)
- 2026 to present: David J. Crosby

== See also ==
- Bethlehem, Pennsylvania
- Community band
- Concert band
- Northampton County, Pennsylvania
