= 2005 Northampton County Executive election =

- November 8, 2005

Nominee	John Stoffa	Bob Nyce
Party	Democratic	Republican
Popular vote	21,288	19,218
Percentage	52.54%	47.44%
County Executive before election
Glenn Reibman
Democratic
Elected County Executive
John Stoffa
Democratic

The 2005 Northampton County Executive election was held on November 8, 2005. Incumbent Democratic County Executive Glenn Reibman ran for re-election to a third term. He was challenged in the Democratic primary by John Stoffa, a member of the Northampton Area School District Board, who attacked Reibman over a series of controversial tax increases. Stoffa narrowly defeated Reibman in the primary, winning the nomination with 52 percent of the vote. In the Republican primary, former State Representative Bob Nyce defeated County Councilwoman, 42–37 percent, and advanced to the general election. Stoffa defeated Nyce by a thin margin, winning his first term as County Executive with 53 percent of the vote.

== Democratic primary ==
=== Candidates ===
- John Stoffa, Northampton Area School District Board Member, former County Human Services Director
- Glenn Reibman, incumbent County Executive

=== Results ===
Democratic primary results
Party	Candidate	Votes	%
Democratic	John Stoffa	7,678	52.41%
Democratic	Glenn Reibman (inc.)	6,955	47.47%
Democratic	Write-ins	17	0.12%
Total votes		14,650	100.00%

== Republican primary ==
=== Candidates ===
- Bob Nyce, Executive Director of the Independent Regulatory Review Commission, former State Representative
- Peg Ferraro, County Councilwoman
- Douglas Dodge, Wilson Borough Councilman

=== Results ===
Republican primary results
Party	Candidate	Votes	%
Republican	Bob Nyce	5,048	41.94%
Republican	Peg Ferraro	4,492	37.32%
Republican	Douglas D. Dodge	2,492	20.70%
Republican	Write-ins	5	0.04%
Total votes		12,037	100.00%

== General election ==
=== Results ===
2005 Northampton County Executive election
Party	Candidate	Votes	%
Democratic	John Stoffa	21,288	52.54%
Republican	Bob Nyce	19,218	47.44%
Write-in		8	0.02%
Total votes		40,514	100.00%
Democratic hold			
