= Kenneth Smyth =

Kenneth Smyth may refer to:

- Ken Smyth, Australian politician
- Lieutenant-Colonel Kenneth Smyth of 4th Parachute Brigade (United Kingdom)
- Kenneth Smyth, killed in The Troubles in Strabane

== See also ==
- Kenneth Smith (disambiguation)
