= James Delgrosso =

American politician (1943–2009)

Mayor James Delgrosso

Interim Mayor of Bethlehem, Pennsylvania
- In office March 12, 2003 – January 5, 2004
- Preceded by: Don Cunningham
- Succeeded by: John B. Callahan

Personal details
- Born: June 30, 1943 Bethlehem, Pennsylvania, U.S.
- Died: October 8, 2009 (aged 66) Philadelphia, Pennsylvania, U.S.
- Party: Democratic
- Spouse: Debbie Delgrosso
- Children: 2
- Education: Kutztown University of Pennsylvania
- Profession: Educator

James A. Delgrosso (June 30, 1943 – October 8, 2009) was an American politician. He served as a longtime city councilman from 1982 until 2003, as well as the interim Mayor of Bethlehem, Pennsylvania, for 10 months from 2003 until 2004.

== Early life ==
Delgrosso was born in Bethlehem, Pennsylvania on June 30, 1943. Delgrosso received his bachelor's degree in education from Kutztown University of Pennsylvania. He completed his master's degree at Penn State University and Temple University.

Delgrosso's family credited his interest in politics and public service to his father, Albert "Prince" Delgrosso. Albert Delgrosso had unsuccessfully campaigned for a seat on the Bethlehem City Council.

== Career ==
=== Educator ===
He taught driver's education at Liberty High School in Bethlehem, Pennsylvania, from 1965 to 2003.

=== Bethlehem City Council ===
Delgrosso was elected in the Bethlehem City Council in 1981 and took office in 1982. He served as the chairman of the city council's Finance Committee for twelve years while in office. Delgrosso became the President of the city council on two separate occasions from 1990-1993, and from 1996 until 1997.

Delgrosso was known as a "fiscal watchdog" during his years as a member of the Bethlehem City Council. He often thoroughly scrutinized the city budgets. During his time in office, Delgrosso presided over some of the most tumultuous recent years in modern Bethlehem history. While in office, Bethlehem Steel, the city's largest source of tax revenue and largest employer, filed for bankruptcy in 2001, and closed most of its local facilities.

In 1996, fully five years before Bethlehem Steel's bankruptcy, Delgrosso cast a deciding vote to rezone all of Bethlehem Steel's land located in the city's South Side. The city council vote rezoned the industrial Bethlehem Steel plant, allowing the city or developers to build just about anything in the area, except for landfills and prisons. The rezoning allowed for the opening of the Sands Casino Resort Bethlehem, which opened on the land in 2009. The Bethlehem Commerce Center, which was estimated to cost $1 billion to construct, also opened with new businesses on the eastern tract of rezoned land during Delgrosso's lifetime.

=== Mayor of Bethlehem ===
James Delgrosso became the Mayor of Bethlehem on March 12, 2003, following the resignation of his predecessor, former Mayor Don Cunningham, who left office to become the Secretary of the Pennsylvania Department of General Services under Governor Ed Rendell. Delgrooso declared his intention to seek a full term as mayor and actively campaigned while in office. However, he lost in the Democratic mayoral primary election in 2003 to John B. Callahan. The primary election between Delgrosso and Callahan was described as "close and contentious" by The Express-Times.

Delgrosso retired from city government in December 2003 and was succeeded by Mayor John B. Callahan, who took office on January 5, 2004.

=== Community work and later life ===
Additionally, Delgrosso served on the boards of directors of several local organizations, including the Historic Bethlehem Partnership, the Bethlehem Economic Development Corporation and the Bethlehem Area Public Library.

Delgrosso died of leukemia on October 8, 2009, at the age of 66, in the Hospital of the University of Pennsylvania. He had been diagnosed with the disease in July 2009. Delgrosso, a resident of Bethlehem's Northeast, was survived by his wife, Debbie; son, Jim Delgrosso Jr.; daughter, Lisa, and two grandchildren.
