= James Yeakel =

American politician

Mayor James M. Yeakel
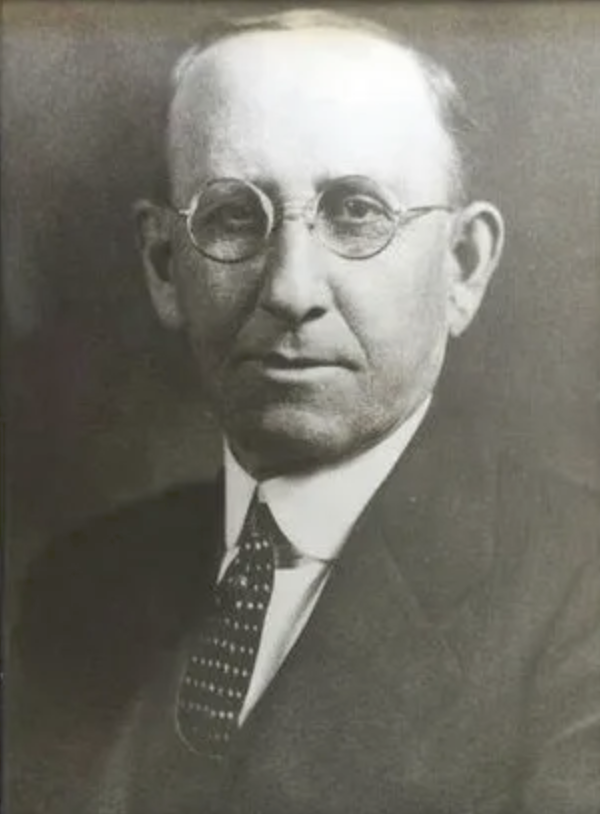

2nd Mayor of Bethlehem, Pennsylvania
- In office 1922–1930
- Preceded by: Archibald Johnston
- Succeeded by: Robert Pfeifle

Chief Burgess of Bethlehem
- In office 1914–1918

Bethlehem Councilmen
- In office 1890–1901

Personal details
- Born: March 28, 1860
- Died: Unknown
- Party: Democratic
- Occupation: Coachbuilder

James Milton Yeakel was an American politician who served as mayor of Bethlehem, Pennsylvania, for eight years between 1922 and 1930. Before entering politics Yeakel worked as a Coachbuilder.

== Biography ==
=== Early life ===
Yeakel was born on March 28, 1860, in Bethlehem to Peter and Marguerite Yeakel, both immigrants from Germany. He attended public school until he was thirteen when he would be privately tutored by Moravian professor Ambrose Rondthaler. He worked on his family farm until he was apprenticed to a wheelwright named Henry S. Sellers. Starting in 1890 he worked as a Coachbuilder with a partner at the Fatzinger & Yeakel company, until Mr. Fatzinger died and Yeakel took sole ownership of the company.

=== Town council ===
Yeakel was elected to the Bethlehem council in 1890, having been elected to the office three times, and appointed to the office once, serving until 1901. He was one of the few Democrats on the otherwise strongly Republican council. On November 4, 1913, he was elected Chief Burgess of Bethlehem, with his term expiring in 1918.

=== Mayoralty ===
Yeakel would be elected mayor in 1922. As mayor Yeakel focused his efforts on improving the city's infrastructure and services. Namely supplying clean water to city residents, ensuring sufficient fire protection and developing more land that had been previously unusable in the city's southside. As mayor he also oversaw the construction of the Hill to Hill Bridge connecting the two halves of the city. Additionally during his time as mayor the city's newspapers the Daily Times and the Globe merged to form the Bethlehem Globe-Times which is now known as The Express-Times. However, Mayor Yeakel is most infamously for his inaction as Bethlehem became known as a resort town for New Yorkers to come and commit various vices that were illegal at the time due to Prohibition. Gambling dens, brothels, and Speakeasies were commonplace in the city's southside. On November 12, 1927, officer Charles Fenton was shot and killed attempting to apprehend a robbery suspect from one of the south side's 35 brothels. His death sparked massive outcry for the city government to step in and restore law and order. Mayor Yeakel seemed disinterested at best with the growing issue of crime and violence in the city's south side. This would result in his defeat in the primaries during his re-election campaign in 1930 to Robert Pfeifle who ran on a tough on crime platform.

=== Personal life ===
Yeakel married Lannie née Irene on June 11, 1891.
