= John B. Callahan =

10th Mayor of Bethlehem, Pennsylvania

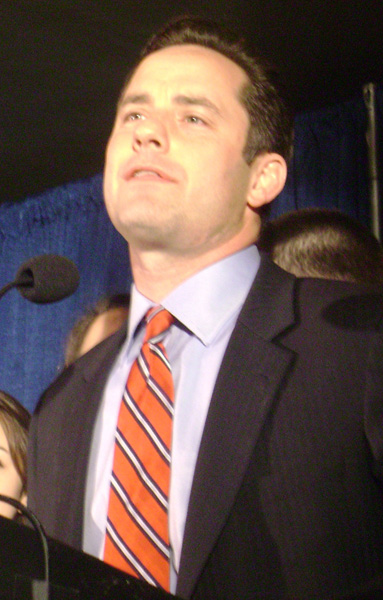

10th Mayor of Bethlehem, Pennsylvania
- In office January 5, 2004 – January 7, 2014
- Preceded by: James Delgrosso
- Succeeded by: Robert Donchez

Personal details
- Born: September 20, 1969 (age 56) Bethlehem, Pennsylvania, U.S.
- Party: Democratic
- Spouse: Mafalda Callahan
- Children: Sarah Callahan; Evan Callahan; John Callahan
- Education: Moravian College (B.S.)
- Occupation: Senior Institutional Healthcare Consultant
- Website: Callahan For Congress

John B. Callahan (born September 20, 1969) was the 10th Mayor of Bethlehem, Pennsylvania. He was the Democratic nominee in an unsuccessful 2010 bid for United States Representative for Pennsylvania's 15th congressional district.

Callahan was inaugurated Mayor of Bethlehem in 2004 at the age of 34-years old, becoming the second youngest mayor in the city's history after former Mayor Don Cunningham, who was 31.

== Early life, education and career ==
From the age of five, Callahan grew up on the west side of Bethlehem, Pennsylvania. He graduated from Liberty High School, where he was voted class president in 1987. Callahan graduated cum laude with a B.S. in Biology from Moravian College, was named senior scholar athlete of the year and won the Tubby Campbell Award for dedication and sportsmanship in wrestling. He was also named interfraternity man of the year, and was the commencement speaker for his class in 1991. After graduation, Callahan worked for Pfizer Inc. for 13 years as a senior institutional healthcare consultant. He started with Pfizer working in Connecticut and New Jersey before getting a transfer closer to home in Pennsylvania in 1995.

He is a graduate of the Harvard Kennedy School Executive Program on Leadership in the 21st Century, and the Transition and Leadership for New Elected Mayors Program. The United States Conference of Mayors later invited Callahan back to Harvard Kennedy School to speak about transitioning from political campaigning to governing.

== Bethlehem City Council ==
Callahan, a Democrat, announced his candidacy for Bethlehem city council in February 1997. He described himself as a political outsider and promised during his campaign to keep property taxes steady, ensure effective delivery of municipal services, and increase the city's tax base with "rational economic development". John Tallarico, owner of Bethlehem's Linden Food Market, worked as Callahan's campaign chairman.

Callahan was elected, becoming the youngest ever Bethlehem councilman. He served on council from 1998 to 2004, during which time he chaired the finance and public works committees.

== Mayor of Bethlehem ==
Callahan defeated incumbent Bethlehem Mayor James Delgrosso in the 2003 Democratic mayoral primary election. He was elected mayor in the November 2003 general election, taking over 60% of the popular vote and winning every ward in the city. He was inaugurated on January 5, 2004, for a two-year term. Callahan was re-elected in the 2005 primary elections and ran unopposed in the general election. He was sworn in for his first four-year term on January 3, 2006, and was re-elected in 2009.

Early in his mayoral tenure, Callahan had a strained relationship with council and was reluctant to compromise, often rolling his eyes when critics spoke against him at council meetings. His relationship with council eventually improved, particularly as his more vocal critics left office. Callahan was known for his charming behavior with residents, but also had a reputation for pushing strongly behind the scenes for issues he supported, and sometimes responding in an abrasive way to opponents. Robert Donchez, a future Bethlehem mayor who was council president during Callahan's tenure, said of Callahan: "John has a very competitive nature (and) is not willing to back down. That is good in many ways (but) makes him less flexible in moving to a middle ground."

Early in his term, Callahan vetoed a schedule to fund a $7.39 million bond to cover a federal civil rights suit. The veto was rarely used in Bethlehem to that point, and council overrode the measure 6–1. In 2004, when the city was considering a $66 million refinancing, city water authority Chairman Ronald Donchez said Callahan pressed so aggressively for one particular bank that Donchez considered resigning. Six years after Callahan took office, developers had invested $2 billion in Bethlehem, creating more than 5,000 jobs, and violent crime in the city dropped by 25 percent.

== 2010 U.S. Congressional campaign ==
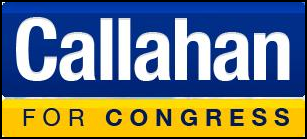
2010 Congressional campaign logo

Callahan announced his intention to challenge incumbent Charlie Dent for Pennsylvania's 15th congressional district on July 27, 2009. Independent Jake Towne also ran. Callahan made his record in Bethlehem a focal point on his campaign, positioning himself as knowledgeable about how to rejuvenate an economy, a central issue in the 2010 mid-term elections.

Callahan lost the race, earning 39 percent of the votes compared to Dent's 54 percent.

== 2013 Northampton County Executive campaign ==
Callahan announced his candidacy for Northampton County Executive on February 6, 2013, after sitting Executive John Stoffa announced his lack of desire to seek reelection. He won the Democratic primary with over 50% of the vote, which was held on May 21. He lost the election to the Republican candidate; Bangor, Pennsylvania Mayor John Brown, with 47% of the vote to Brown's 52%. The results were seen as an upset due to Callahan's higher fundraising and better name recognition.

== Later political career ==
Callahan was a member of the 300 person transition team for incoming Governor Josh Shapiro in 2022, serving on the Business Development Subcommittee.

== Personal life ==
Callahan has three children with his wife Mafalda (née Villani); the family resides in Northeast Bethlehem. Callahan met Mafalda when they were in junior high school together. Growing up in west Bethlehem, Callahan's father had a drinking problem and his parents divorced when he was a child. During his congressional campaign, Callahan said he spent more time at the houses of friends than his own home, and credited his wrestling coaches and other community members for keeping his life on a positive track.

Callahan served on the board of directors for the Lehigh Valley Industrial Park, Lehigh Valley Economic Development Corporation, and the Minsi Trails Council of the Boy Scouts of America. Callahan also chaired the Urban Scouting Program in Bethlehem, and was a member of the Bethlehem Rotary Club.
