= Almont, Pennsylvania =

Unincorporated community in Pennsylvania, US

Almont
- Populated place
- Almont, West Rockhill Township, Bucks County, Pennsylvania Almont (the United States)
- Coordinates: 40°21′51″N 75°20′4″W
- Country: United States
- State: Pennsylvania
- County: Bucks
- Elevation: 571 ft (174 m)
- Time zone: UTC-5 (EST)
  - Summer (DST): UTC-4 (EDT)
- ZIP code: 18960
- Area codes: 215, 267, 445

Almont is a populated place in West Rockhill Township, Bucks County, Pennsylvania, United States, approximately one-half mile west of Sellersville.

== History ==
The area was settled mostly by Pennsylvania Germans in the early 1700s. Early religions were Lutheran from the Old Goshenhoppen parish, Reformed and Mennonite. In 1826 land for the first church was donated by Enos Schlichter, built and shared by the three congregations. In 1868, Jacob Schlichter became the first postmaster and named it Schlichter, the post office was later changed to Almont as well as the community. Mail is now delivered by the Sellersville Post Office.

== Geography ==
Almont is located approximately 0.5 miles (0.80 km) south of Sellersville on Pennsylvania Route 563, and is located within the Sellersville 18960 zip code, and the Pennridge School District.

== Notable residents ==
- Robert Pfeifle, 3rd Mayor of Bethlehem, Pennsylvania
