= Kenneth Smith (mayor) =

American politician

Mayor Kenneth Smith

8th Mayor of Bethlehem
- In office 1988–1997
- Preceded by: Gordon Mowrer
- Succeeded by: Paul Marcincin

Personal details
- Party: Republican
- Spouse: Barbra Smith
- Education: Lehigh University

Kenneth "Ken" Smith is an American politician who served as mayor of Bethlehem, Pennsylvania, for 9 years from 1988 to 1997. A Republican, he led the city through the closing of the Bethlehem Steel plant in the city as well as its 250th anniversary.

== Career ==
=== Mayor of Bethlehem ===
In 1987 mayor Paul Marcincin ran for and won a third term as mayor, despite term limits explicitly stating the mayor could only hold office for two terms. The city council would sue Marcincin and the Supreme Court of Pennsylvania ruled in favor of the term limits. Former mayor Gordon Mowrer would be interim mayor for 10 months until a special election was held. In that election, Smith, a local businessmen and political outsider ran as a Republican in a Democrat controlled city. Despite this he defeated his opponent Michael Loupos by 1,000 votes out of a total of 16,200. During his time as mayor the Bethlehem Steel mill, the long time lifeblood of the industrial workforce of the city, was shuttered. Mayor Smith guided the city through this turbulent time by promoting the diversifying the city's industrial parks to offer jobs to those laid off and to prevent a single closure from impacting the city as Bethlehem Steel did. As mayor he also oversaw the construction of the $60 million Penn Forrest Dam creating a reservoir and hydroelectric power for Bethlehem. Additionally he also oversaw the celebrations of the city's 250th anniversary. It was determined that his initial two-year term fulfilling the remainder of Marcincin's term didn't count towards his term limit, and he was able to stand for re-election a second time for another four-year term. However, he would resign four months early to become the vice president of public affairs with his alma mater, Lehigh University. His predecessor, Marcincin, would serve as the interim mayor until an election could be held.

=== Post Mayoral career ===
After his retirement Smith has remained active in city politics serving on the board of several institutions including St Luke's Hospital. He also attended the swearing in of mayor J. William Reynolds. He had the Sand Island Recreational Complex named in his honor by mayor Robert Donchez.

== Personal life ==
Smith is married to Barbara Smith and the couple are snowbirders, spending half the year in Bethlehem and the other half in Boynton Beach, Florida. His wife also owns a store in Bethlehem known as "the Heritage."
