= 2009 Lehigh County Executive election =

- November 3, 2009
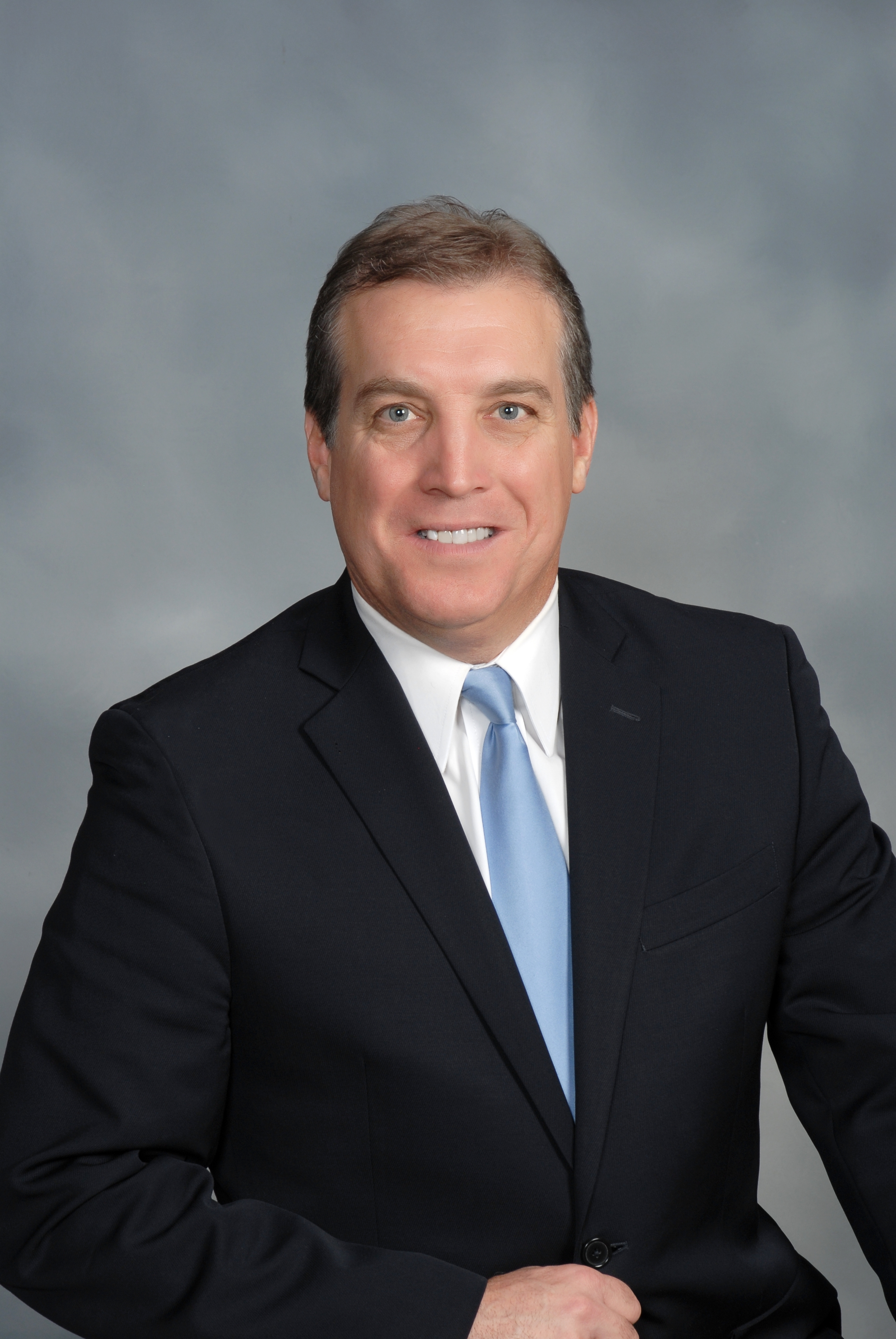

Nominee	Don Cunningham	Scott Ott
Party	Democratic	Republican
Popular vote	21,063	20,201
Percentage	51.04%	48.96%
County Executive before election
Don Cunningham
Democratic
Elected County Executive
Don Cunningham
Democratic

The 2009 Lehigh County Executive election was held on November 3, 2009. Incumbent Democratic County Executive Don Cunningham ran for re-election to a second term. He was challenged by Republican nominee Scott Ott, a satirical website publisher. Despite Cunningham's fundraising advantage and stronger name recognition, he was expected to win by a wide margin, but only narrowly defeated Ott, winning 51–49 percent, a margin of just 862 votes.

Prior to the completion of Cunningham's second term, he resigned from office in 2012 to become the head of the Lehigh Valley Economic Development Corporation. Former County Commissioner Bill Hansell was appointed to serve out the remainder of Cunningham's term.

== Democratic primary ==
=== Candidates ===
- Don Cunningham, incumbent County Executive

=== Results ===
Democratic primary results
Party	Candidate	Votes	%
Democratic	Don Cunningham	9,688	100.00%
Total votes		9,688	100.00%

== Republican primary ==
=== Candidates ===
- Scott Ott, satirical website publisher

=== Results ===
Republican primary results
Party	Candidate	Votes	%
Republican	Scott Ott	8,363	100.00%
Total votes		8,363	100.00%

== General election ==
=== Results ===
2009 Lehigh County Executive election
Party	Candidate	Votes	%
Democratic	Don Cunningham (inc.)	21,063	51.04%
Republican	Scott Ott	20,201	48.96%
Total votes		41,264	100.00%
Democratic hold			
