= Paul Marcincin =

American politician

Mayor Paul Marcincin

7th Mayor of Bethlehem
- In office 1978–1987
- Preceded by: Gordon Mowrer
- Succeeded by: Gordon Mowrer

Interim Mayor of Bethlehem
- In office October 1997 – January 1998
- Preceded by: Kenneth Smith
- Succeeded by: Don Cunningham

Personal details
- Born: June 22, 1921
- Died: October 26, 2009 (aged 88)
- Party: Democratic
- Education: Moravian University
- Occupation: Teacher

Military service
- Branch/service: United States Air Force
- Years of service: 1941–1945

Paul "Mo-Mo" Marcincin was an American politician. He served as a city councilman of Bethlehem, Pennsylvania, for 12 years. He was also the city's 7th mayor for two periods first from 1978 to 1987 and Interim mayor from 1997 to 1998.

== Early life ==
Marcincin was a lifelong Bethlehem native. He served in the United States Army Air Corps during World War II. Upon returning to Bethlehem he graduated from Moravian College with a degree in teaching later earning his master's degree at Lehigh University. He worked as a teacher for the Bethlehem school district for 36 years, 27 of which were at the Northeast Middle School. He was also the Moravian Greyhounds basketball coach for 24 years.

== Political career ==
Before being elected mayor, Marcincin served 12 years on the city's council, during which he voted in favor of a two-term limit for mayors with an additional interim term for emergencies. The council's rational was that it would prevent young and massively popular incumbent mayor Gordon Mowrer from holding office for decades. Marcincin would run against fellow Democrat Mowrer in the 1978 primary defeating him in a stunning upset.

As mayor, Marcincin is best remembered for creating Musikfest as part of his effort to revitalize the city following the closure of the Bethlehem Steel plant. This was part of a broader push to attract tourists and high-tech ventures to the city. He successfully won re-election for a second term and continued to push his redevelopment of the city including working with first lady Rosalynn Carter on renovation projects.

Following his second term in office Marcincin sought re-election for a third term. His rational for running for a third term even though he himself voted to implement a two term limit was that the Northampton County Court found the ordinance illegal citing that "politicians cannot set term limits for politicians". Following his successful election to a third term the city successfully appealed the case to the Supreme Court of Pennsylvania voiding the remainder of Marcincin's term with his predecessor, Gordon Mowrer, being named interim mayor for 10 months until elections were held in November.

When mayor Ken Smith resigned with 3 months left in his term to become the vice president of public affairs at Lehigh University in 1997, Marcincin was appointed by a unanimous vote of the city council to serve the remainder of his term. 79 years old and 10 years retired at the time, Marcincin stated that he wished to be a "consultant to the incoming mayor" and serve solely in a transitional authority. During this period he passed the city's budget for 1998 slightly increasing property tax.

== Personal life ==
Marcincin had 8 sibilings, three sisters; Margaret, Dorothy and Elizabeth, and five brothers; Felix, Joseph, John, Frank, and Philip. He was married to Elizabeth R. Racho-Marcincin for 55 years. Together they had four children; Dr. Robert P. Marcincin, Dr. Terry L. Marcincin, Dr. Paul G. Marcincin and Dr. MaryBeth Marcincin-Lawless.
