= Hill to Hill Bridge =

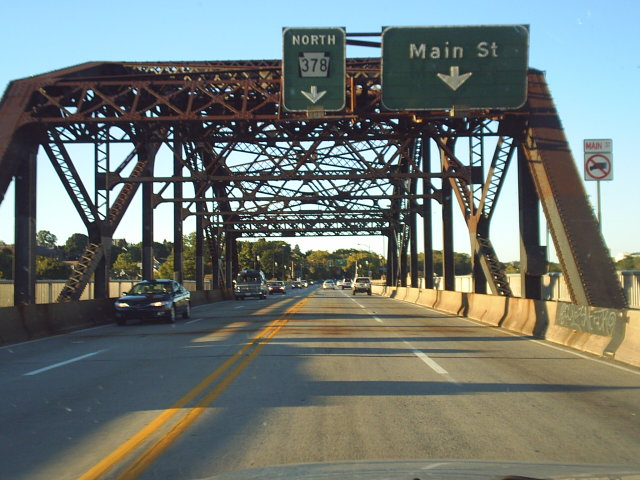
- Hill to Hill Bridge heading northbound in October 2005
- Coordinates: 40.6155°N 75.3846°W
- Carries: 4 lanes of PA 378 and 2 sidewalks
- Crosses: Lehigh River
- Locale: Bethlehem, Pennsylvania, U.S.
- Official name: Hill to Hill Bridge
- Other name(s): Route 378 Bridge

Characteristics
- Design: concrete arch truss bridge

History
- Opened: 1924

Statistics
- Toll: Free

The Hill to Hill Bridge is a road crossing of the Lehigh River and linking the south and north sides of Bethlehem, Pennsylvania in the Lehigh Valley region of eastern Pennsylvania.

Completed in 1924, Hill to Hill Bridge carries Pennsylvania Route 378 from Wyandotte Street on Bethlehem's south side to a series of ramps and viaducts on the north side. It replaced a two-lane covered bridge and eliminated several grade crossings of three railroads on the two banks of the Lehigh River. The Hill to Hill Bridge is located in the Central Bethlehem Historic District and was added to the National Register of Historic Places in 1972 with a boundary increase to the designation added in 1988.

== History ==
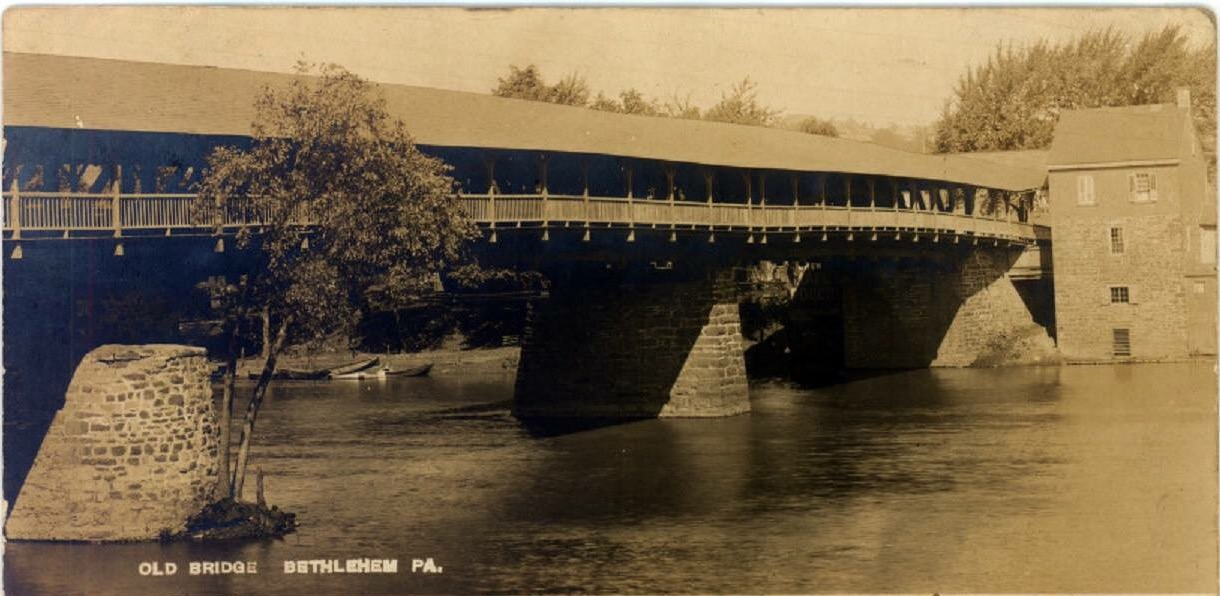
A 1906 photograph of the old bridge, which was replaced in September 1924 with the opening of Hill to Hill Bridge, which crosses the Lehigh River and connects the north and south sides of Bethlehem

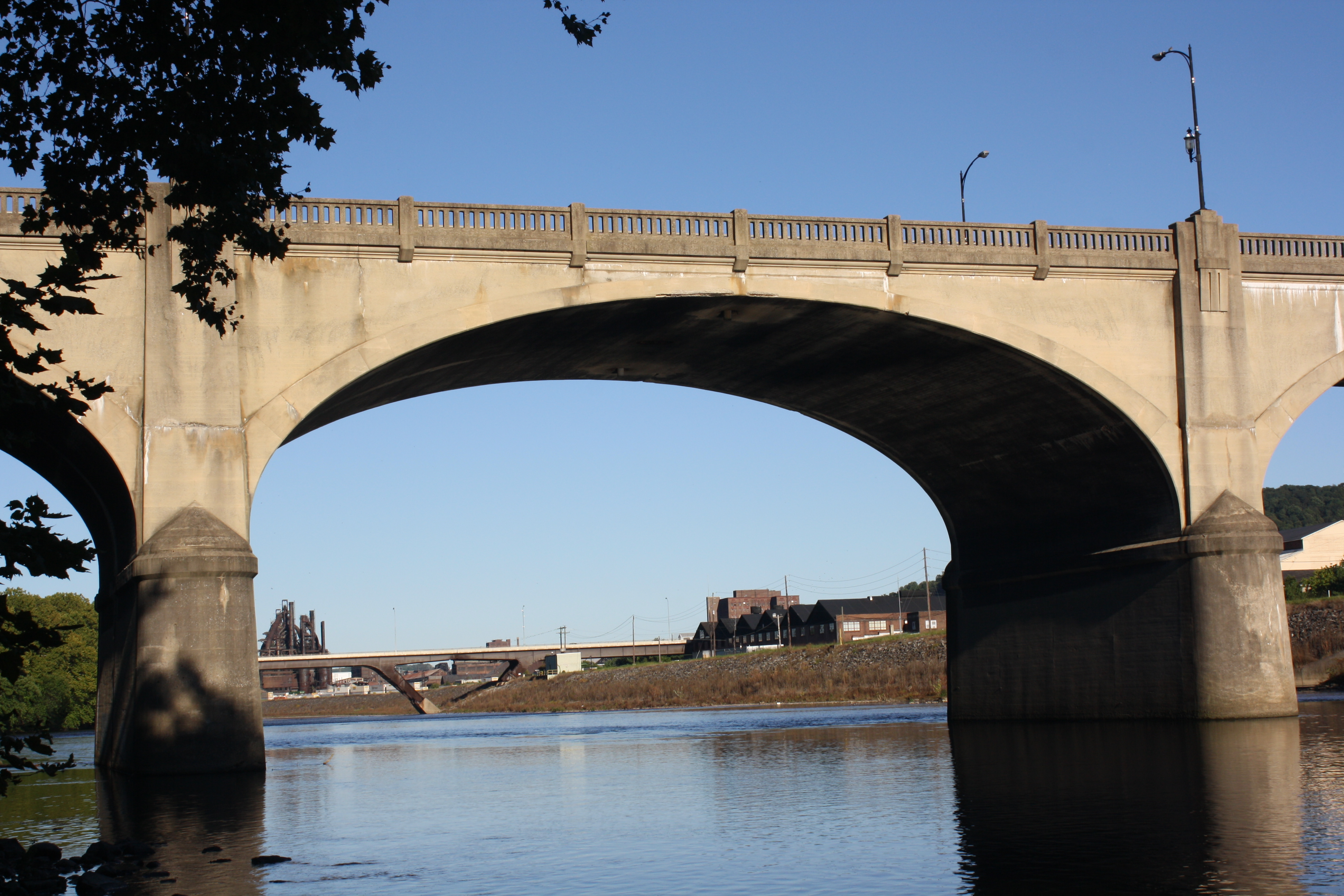
Hill to Hill Bridge in Bethlehem, September 2013

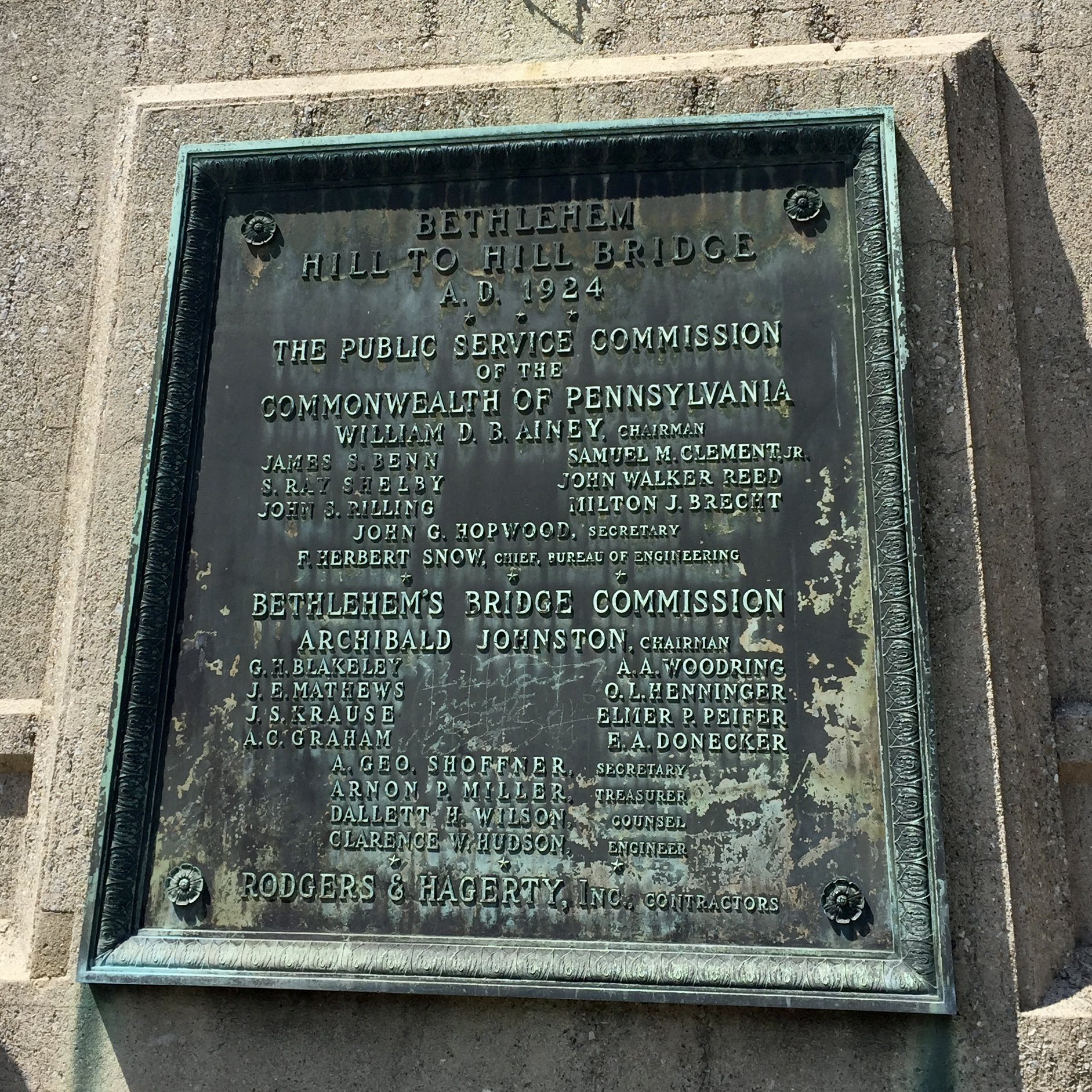
Hill to Hill Bridge dedication plaque, placed 1924 on Bridge Street ramp to Main Street

=== Early history ===
Prior to Bethlehem's incorporation as a city in 1917, the north side and the south side were independent municipalities. During the latter part of the 1910s, three bridges crossed between Bethlehem and South Bethlehem: the Minsi Trail bridge, the New Street bridge, and the Main Street covered bridge.

The Main Street bridge was narrow and was regularly damaged by floods and ice. It crossed several tracks of the Lehigh Valley Railroad and the Reading Railroad on the south side as it led to Wyandotte Street. The Pacific Hotel stood between the southern portal to the covered bridge; the adjacent image shows the active freight and passenger railroad tracks travelers crossed to reach the bridge. Union Station was the passenger station of the Lehigh Valley and Reading Railroads with service to Buffalo, Harrisburg, New York City at Jersey City, New Jersey, and Philadelphia.

On the north side, the bridge crossed the Lehigh Canal and the tracks of the Central Railroad of New Jersey before continuing up Seminary Hill, named for the Moravian Church's Female Seminary, to the Main Street business district.

=== Construction ===
Community leaders found the covered bridge to be a barrier to commerce between "the Bethlehems". As a result of the consolidation of the two municipalities into a single city, sufficient resources became available to design and construct a new bridge connecting Fountain Hill and Seminary Hill.

By 1921, a commission was in place to design and oversee the construction of the new Lehigh River span. Commission members were the city's first mayor, Archibald Johnston (chairman), J.S. Krause (vice-chairman), G.H. Blakeley, O.L. Henninger (representing Lehigh County), A.A. Woodring (representing Northampton County), A. Geo. Shoffner (secretary), Dallett H. Wilson (counsel) and C.W. Hudson (engineer).

Construction on the Hill to Hill Bridge began on August 1, 1921, after many previous plans. As constructed, the bridge had nine approaches, eleven abutments, forty-eight piers, and fifty-eight spans. It was considered an engineering marvel of its time. By September 1924, the bridge was complete and opened by mayor James Yeakel and provided safe, grade-separated connections between the two halves of the city.

A 52-page brochure was distributed as a part of the public dedication in September 1924.

Pictorial narrative of design and construction of Bethlehem’s Hill-to-Hill Bridge

=== Modernization ===
The structure of the Hill to Hill Bridge was modified significantly during the years after World War II. The first significant change to traffic on the bridge came during the construction of the expressway portion of PA Route 378 north of the bridge, known locally as the Spur Route. Initially, the Second Avenue ramp on the north side was closed in 1967. In 1968, the expressway portion was opened.

Three other ramps were removed as part of safety, structural, and redevelopment efforts. On the north side, the South Main Street ramp leading to Lehigh Street and the industrial area along Monocacy Creek was removed in 1965. The River Street ramp leading to Sand Island was removed in 1988. On the south side, the Second Street ramp was removed in 1989.

The bridge saw extensive repairs in 1990, and was painted in spring of 2009. The painting process had caused two of the four traffic lanes to be closed, and had resulted in major traffic congestion. The painting project was finished in time for the opening of the Sands Casino Resort Bethlehem, which was later renamed Wind Creek Bethlehem after its acquisition by Wind Creek Hospitality.

== Bridge structure ==
The bridge is noted for its many ramps and branches. It was designed by Clarence W. Hudson and its structure makes use of "a combination of steel through truss and concrete closed spandrel deck arch spans" A unique characteristic of the bridge was the design of the two truss spans, needed to provide clearance over the railroads. Because the Second Street ramp intersected the bridge at the point of the southern truss span, the normal diagonal trusses could not be included. Engineer C.W. Hudson designed an alternative truss configuration, now known as the Hudson truss, which allowed an opening in the truss web between its vertical members. This bridge's spans are the only known examples of this truss configuration.

=== 1924 (original) ramps and overcrossings from south to north ===
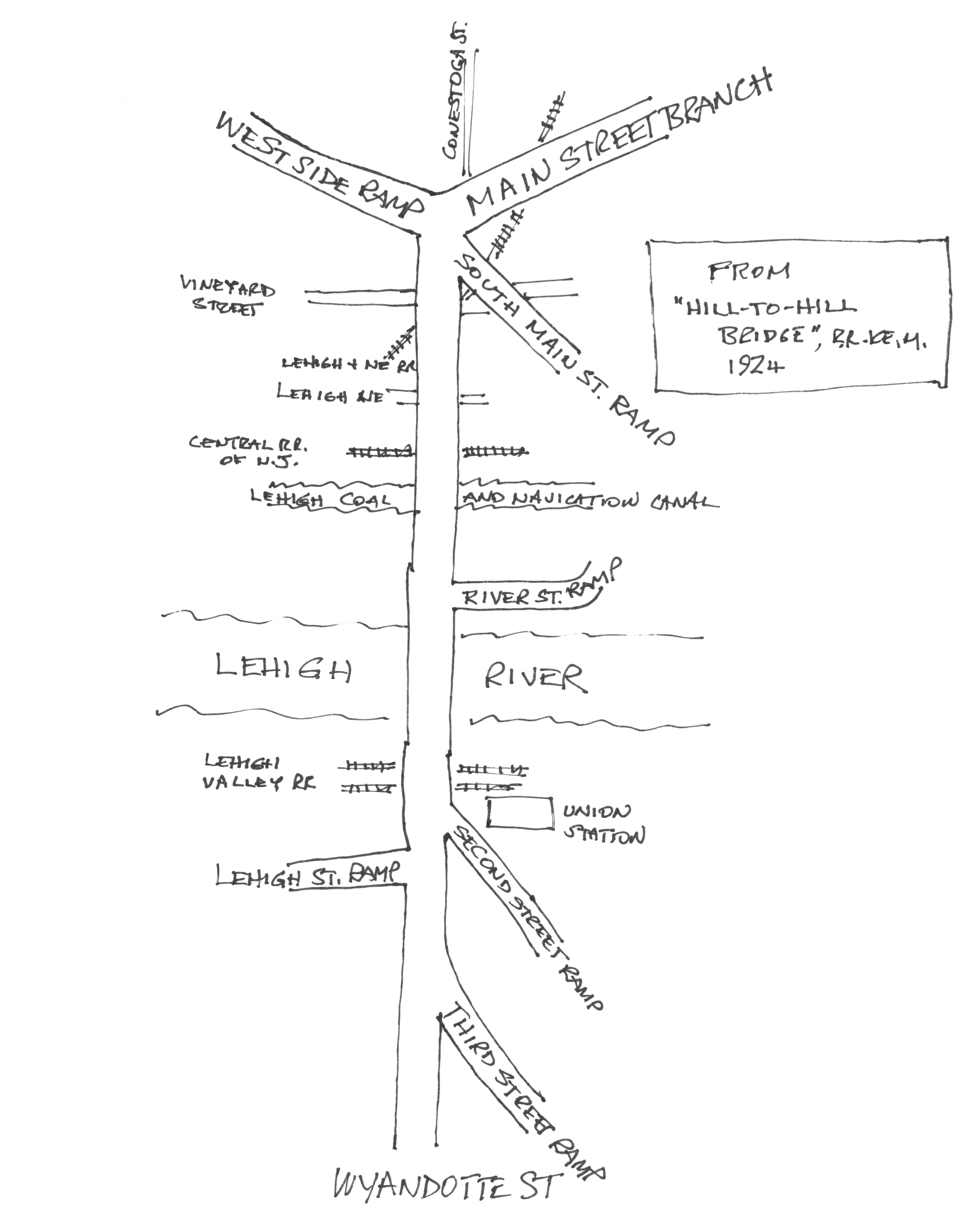
Sketch schematic of Hill-to-Hill Bridge approaches and overcrossings as of opening date in 1924.

- Wyandotte Street entrance
- Third Street ramp
- Lehigh (now Brighton) Street ramp
- Second Street ramp
- (crossing of Lehigh Valley Railroad tracks)
- (crossing of Lehigh River)
- River Street ramp
- (crossing of Lehigh Coal and Navigation Canal)
- (crossing of Central Railroad of New Jersey tracks)
- (crossing of Lehigh Avenue)
- (crossing of Lehigh and New England Railroad)
- (crossing of Vineyard Street)
- (crossing of Spring Street)
- South Main Street ramp
- West Side ramp
- Main Street Branch
- (crossing of Main Street)

=== Current ramps and overcrossings from south to north ===
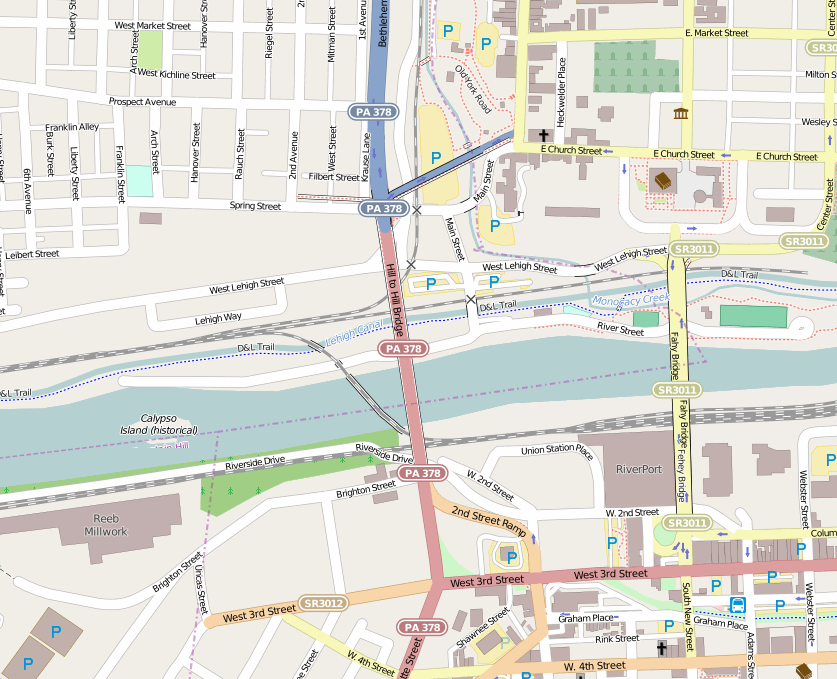
Hill-to-Hill Bridge in Bethlehem, Pennsylvania in December 2014

- Wyandotte Street entrance
- Second Street ramp
- Brighton Street ramp
- (crossing of Norfolk Southern Railroad)
- (crossing of Lehigh River)
- (crossing of Norfolk Southern Railroad tracks)
- (crossing of West Lehigh Street)
- (crossing of Spring Street)
- Main Street/Bridge Street ramp
- Pennsylvania Route 378 ("Spur Route") entrance

== Gallery ==
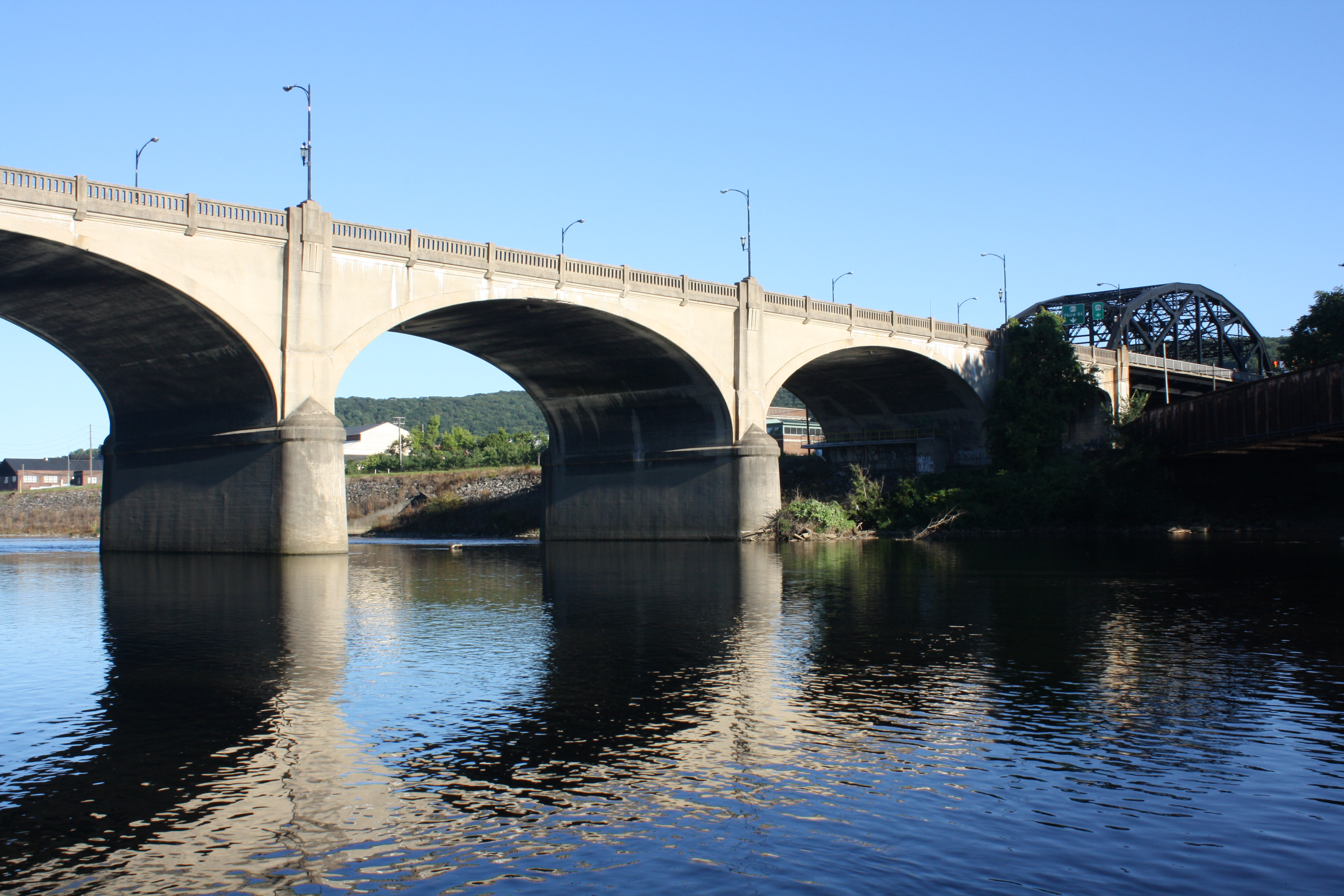
Bridge spans over Lehigh River.

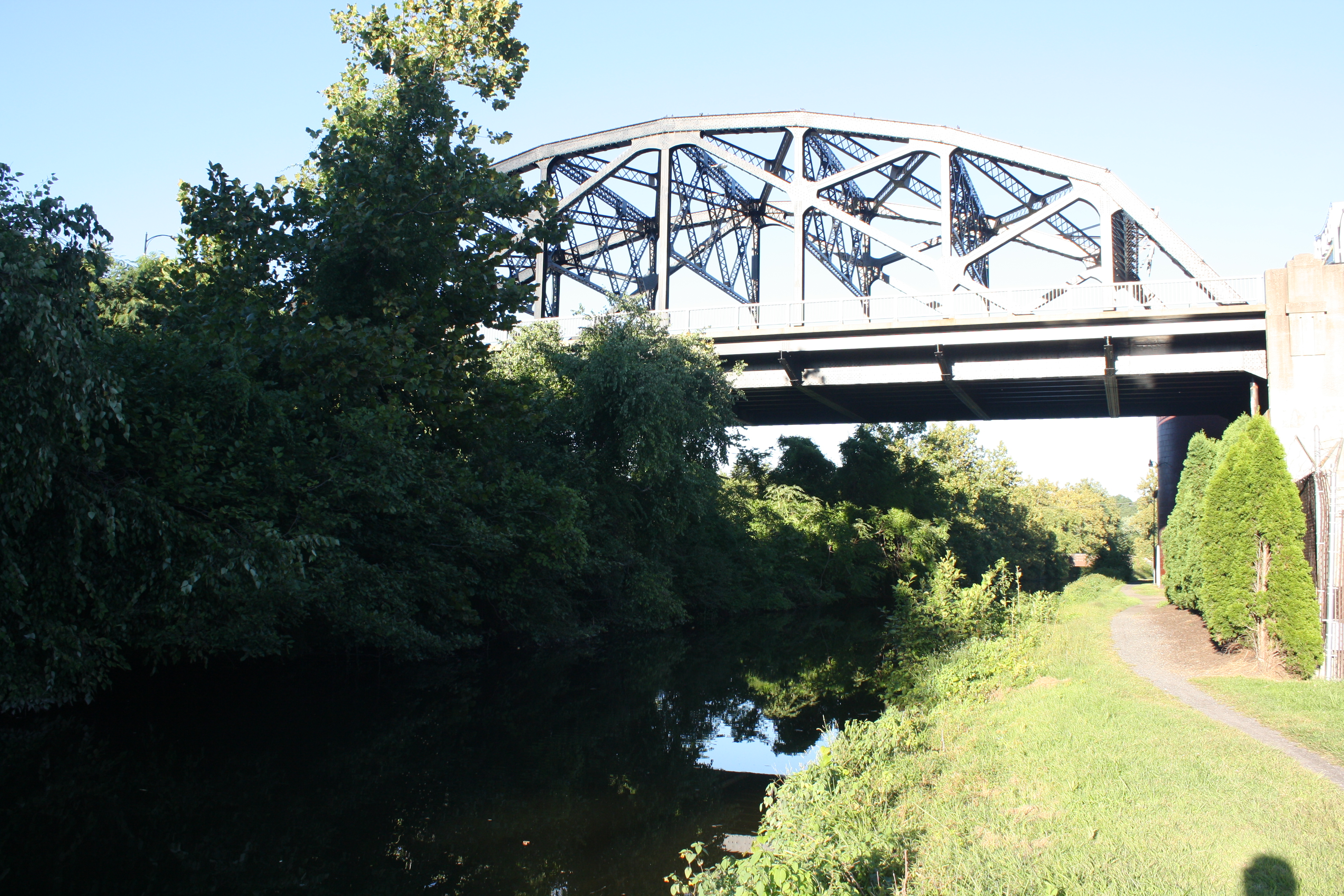
Bridge span over Lehigh Canal.

== See also ==
- Lehigh River
- List of bridges documented by the Historic American Engineering Record in Pennsylvania
