= J. William Reynolds =

American politician (born 1982)

Mayor J. William Reynolds
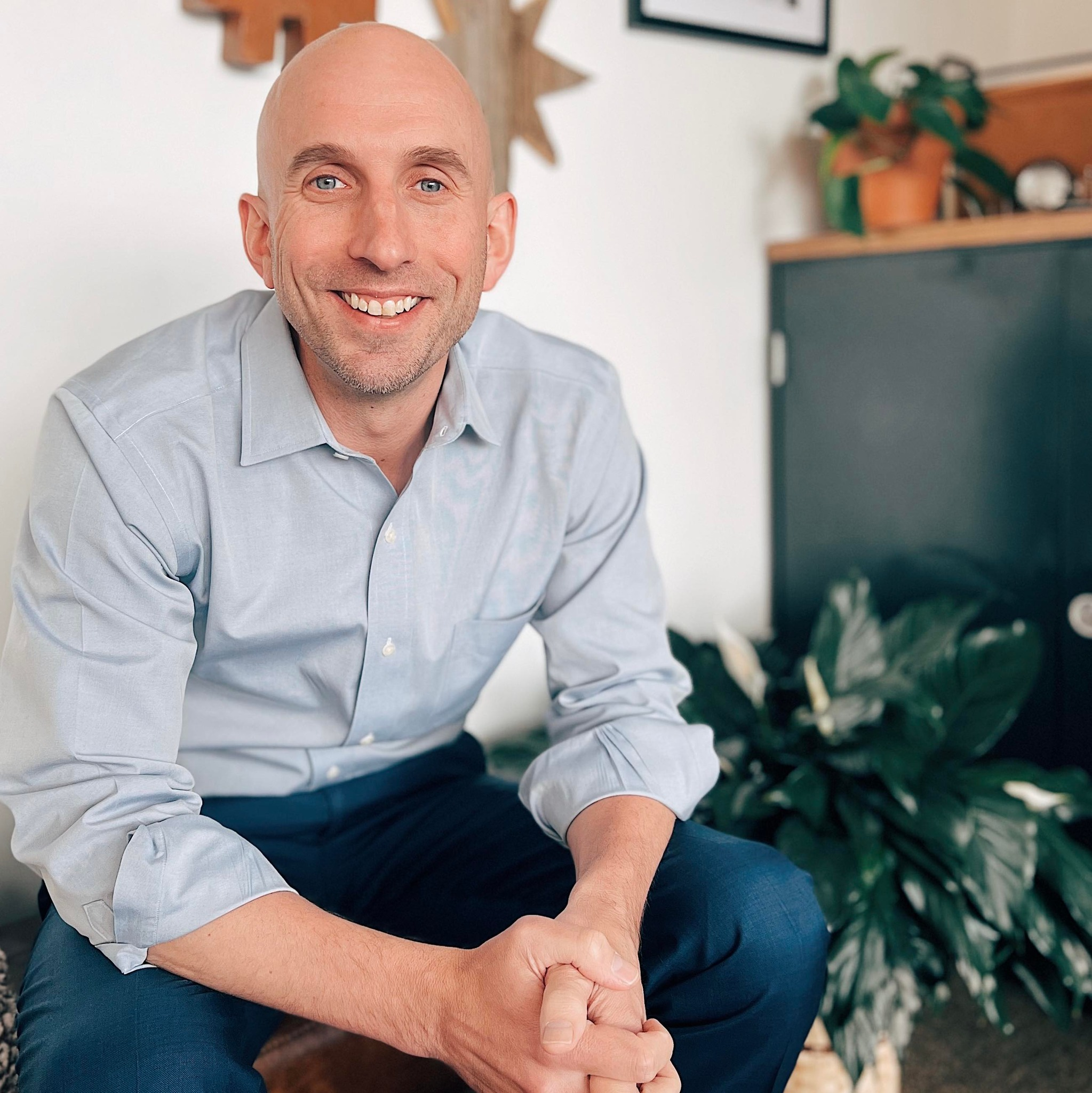
- Reynolds in May 2022

12th Mayor of Bethlehem, Pennsylvania
- Incumbent
- Assumed office January 3, 2022
- Preceded by: Robert Donchez

Bethlehem City Council President
- In office 2016 – January 3, 2022

Bethlehem City Councillor
- In office 2008 – January 3, 2022

Personal details
- Born: June 1, 1982 (age 44) Bethlehem, Pennsylvania, U.S.
- Party: Democratic
- Spouse: Dr. Natalie Bieber
- Education: Moravian University (BA)
- Occupation: Politician

J. William "Willie" Reynolds is an American politician. He served as a city councilman of Bethlehem, Pennsylvania from 2008 until 2022 and is currently the city's 12th and incumbent mayor. Following a successful re-election, he began his second term in 2026, which is set to expire in 2030. He is not eligible for re-election.

== Early life and education ==
Reynolds is a lifelong Bethlehem, Pennsylvania native and attended Liberty High School in Bethlehem and received his bachelor's degree in education from Moravian University.

== Career ==
He served as a legislative aide to state representative Steve Samuelson from May 2003 through September 2009. He then worked as a history teacher in the Allentown School District from September 2009 until his mayoral campaign in 2021.

=== Bethlehem City Council ===
Reynolds was elected in the Bethlehem City Council in 2007 and took office in 2008. At the time he was the youngest person to be elected to this position. He was elected the President of City Council in 2016, and held this office until he became Mayor in 2022. At the time of stepping down he was the longest serving member of the City Council. He was known for his activism for civil rights and equality, and his push for financial accountability for economic development programs. He has supported the City Council's efforts to decriminalize marijuana and reform the police.

=== Mayor of Bethlehem ===
Reynolds had unsuccessfully run for mayor in 2013 where he was narrowly defeated in the Democratic primary by Robert Donchez 51.8 percent to 48.2 percent, a margin of 184 votes. Due to the Republican Party not fielding any candidates, besides a write-in, the Democratic primary was treated as the election proper. Reynolds announced his intention to run for Mayor again on January 5, 2021.

After securing the Democratic Party's nomination he ran against Republican John Kachmar, defeating him soundly, 64.3 percent to 35.7 percent.

In May 2025, Reynolds defeated City Councilwoman Grace Crampsie Smith in the Democratic primary for Bethlehem mayor. He would then run unopposed in the November 2025 general election to secure a second mayoral term.

As mayor, Reynolds hopes to keep Bethlehem one of the "best places to live in America", and to continue to recover from the closing of the Bethlehem Steel Plant. He has also come out in support of the American Rescue Plan which contributed $34.4 million of the city's budget of $118.4 million, saying that this money will be used to allow the city to continue capital projects without going into debt, and further stated it was a contributing factor in Reynolds' ability to reduce the city's debt from $170 million to $110 million. As part of the budget for 2023, the city's contract with Republic Services for trash collection expired and mayor Reynolds and the city council have been unable to reach an agreement on a new contractor despite meeting on the subject 97 times.

Reynolds has promoted cooperation with Allentown's mayor Matthew Tuerk, and Easton's mayor Salvatore J. Panto, Jr. All three are Democrats and together lead the Three City Coalition of the major cities of the Lehigh Valley cooperating on issues of housing, homelessness and sustainability. Additionally, at his state of the city address in 2023 Reynolds announced that the city’s revenue is on track to outpace its debt by 2026. Reynolds has stressed the importance of building more Affordable housing in the city, citing a spike in rent and an only 2% vacancy rate within the city. Reynolds has supported the expansion of the city's social services, such as renovating 25,000 of the city's 37,000 water meters, implementing a new computerized crime-data system, and increasing the number of social workers. Reynolds has touted the city's Bond credit rating and having the maximum legal earned income tax. He has proposed creating more parks and a new community center in the city's south side. Reynolds has worked to increase affirmative action in the city, creating a new office of Equality and Inclusion and working closely with the city's Puerto Rican community. He also seeks to create a new sister-city of Bethlehem in Puerto Rico.

Reynolds has been criticized for spending millions of dollars of public funds towards new affordable housing and diversity projects instead of using the funds to clean up Urban decay.

During Reynold's tenure on February 1, 2023, the United Proclamation of the Gospel, the city's Moravian Church, announced it would be merging its services in a cost cutting measure and seeking to sell three of their historic churches. The two most interested parties were Lehigh University, which sought to buy the churches and demolish them for an expansion, and Reynolds and the city, who wished to buy the churches and demolish them to build affordable housing.

After hearing a $3.7 million bid from Lehigh University and an equal counteroffer from the city, the church put the plan to sell the churches on hold indefinitely, unhappy with the prospect of the historic churches being demolished. Instead, they filed a petition with the United States Department of the Interior to have the churches listed as part of the World Heritage Commission alongside historic Moravian churches in Northern Ireland and Denmark which would prevent the demolition of the buildings.

Despite this being against his and the city's initial wishes, Reynolds has welcomed the prospect of a new World Heritage Site in Bethlehem. On May 7, Reynolds, serving as Chairman of the Bethlehem World Heritage Council, hosted a Saxon delegation led by Michael Kretschmer, the Minister-President of Saxony to tour the Bethlehem Moravian properties, as part of a celebration of the 300th anniversary of Herrnhut, and to express Bethlehem's interest to be included in the multi-national World Heritage Site.

Following the trend of church closures and sales, after 110 years of continuous service, the St. John’s Windish Lutheran Church and St. Peter's Evangelical Lutheran Church voted 120-9 to merge, with services being held in St. Peters until a new venue could be found for the congregation. The two churches where hubs for the city's Windish population with their closure reflecting their dramatic decline since the closure of the Bethlehem Steel mill in 1995. Reynold, acting on the city's behalf, offered to buy the churches and their properties for 3.5 million dollars, however, the church refused the city's offer when it was discovered that the city would turn the properties into a parking lot for the Bethlehem Parking Authority. Lehigh University offered to buy the historic churches for $3.75 million, but did not specify how they would use the churches except that they would not be used for student housing. Reynolds made public pleas at a January City Council meeting to consider selling to the city instead with the parking authority threatening to seize the properties under eminent domain, neither of which convinced the churches to reconsider the city's proposition. The churches accepted Lehigh's offer after their vote to merge.

In 2020, IQE announced that they were shuttering their American headquarters in Bethlehem due to the building be "dilapidated" and moving their office to North Carolina. Serfass Construction, a local architect and general contractor purchased their former headquarters and intended to demolish it and construct a six story apartment complex on its site. In order to do so the property would need to be rezoned from commercial to residential use, and Reynolds led a push to block this change. Citing the CHIPS and Science Act, and the desire for the city to retain a semi-conductor manufacturer, the building is to remain as it is, until a new tenant can be found.

Around the same time, Reynolds and the city council rejected a partnership with the United States Department of Homeland Security to join the national anti-human trafficking task force. Reynolds stated that the reason the city rejected the proposal was due to fear that it would ostracize the largely Puerto Rican population of the city. However, the city government has remained open to a proposal to join at a later date.

At the same time the Reynolds lead search to find a sister city in Puerto Rico picked up, with residents of Bethlehem being able to submit a proposed sister city in an online form.

Reynolds faced backlash on June 22, 2023, when he and Edward Boscola rewrote the permit for discharge points which would allow forever chemicals to be dumped into the Lehigh River. Reynolds and Boscola argued that without the new permit, the chemicals would simply be dumped in a landfill in Lower Saucon Township, but have accepted the protests and vowed to review the language of the permit.

Reynolds experienced national news coverage in June, 2026, when he criticized Love Island contestant Sean Reifel for leaving his job with the Bethlehem Police Department to appear on the show.

== Personal life ==
Reynolds is married to Dr. Natalie Bieber. They both reside in North Bethlehem in the same neighborhood Reynolds was born. He is a member of the Moravian University Board of Trustees and is on the Bethlehem Area Public Library's board of directors.

Reynolds is an avid cyclist and often rides with members of the community and fellow cyclist and Lehigh Valley Democratic mayor Matthew Tuerk. Reynolds is also a member of the Coalition for Appropriate Transportation, a group that promotes cycling throughout the valley.
