= Kenneth Smith (British Army soldier) =

Recipient of the George Cross

- Born: 1 December 1920; Market Rasen
- Died: 10 January 1945 (aged 24); Ist, Yugoslavia
- Burial place: initially Ist, now Belgrade War Cemetery
- Military career
- Allegiance: United Kingdom
- Branch: British Army
- Service years: 1939−1945
- Rank: Signalman
- Service number: 2328696
- Units: Royal Corps of Signals, attached Long Range Desert Group
- Conflicts: Second World War †
- Awards: George Cross

Signalman Kenneth Smith GC (7 December 1920 – 10 January 1945) was a British Soldier of the Royal Corps of Signals, who was posthumously awarded the George Cross for the bravery he showed on the night of 10 January 1945 on the island of Ist in the Adriatic when attached to the Long Range Desert Group.

== Biography ==
Smith was born in Market Rasen, Lincolnshire on 7 December 1920, the eldest son of Bertie and Alice Jane Smith of Louth. He joined the Royal Signals, British Army on 23 January 1939 and served in the Second World War.

== 10 January 1945 ==
At the time of his death he was attached to the signals section of a Long Range Desert Group patrol based in the Adriatic islands. Sabotage was rife on the islands, and in dealing with a time-bomb placed on Ist to disrupt the activities of his patrol, which also threatened a number of civilians, Smith was killed.

The citation published in a supplement to The London Gazette on 19 October 1945 stated in the barest terms:

CENTRAL CHANCERY OF THE ORDERS OF KNIGHTHOOD.

St. James's Palace, S.W.1. 19th October, 1945.

The KING has been graciously pleased to approve the posthumous award of the George Cross, in recognition of most conspicuous gallantry in carrying out hazardous work in a very brave manner, to: —

No. 2328696 Signalman Kenneth SMITH, Royal Corps of Signals (Humby, near Grantham, Lincs.).

However The Times the following day carried the original recommendation for the medal in full:

On the night of 10th January 1945, on the island of Ist in the Adriatic, Signalman Smith was a member of a patrol of the Long Range Desert Group which was attacked by saboteurs, who laid time bombs in vital houses on the island. After hearing some shots, Signalman Smith entered the wireless room and found one such bomb on the table. Realizing that there were a number of partisans in the room and young children elsewhere in the house, Signalman Smith immediately picked up the bomb, which was ticking. He intended to move it to a place of safety behind a wall nearby, but he had gone only a few yards outside the house when the bomb exploded and he was blown to pieces. There is no doubt that Signalman Smith's actions saved the lives of many of his comrades, partisans, and civilians, and that he showed superb courage and a complete disregard for personal safety inlifting a time bomb which was already ticking, when he knew it might explode at any moment.

== Memorials and medal ==
Smith is now buried in the Belgrade War Cemetery. His medals were presented to his mother as she was his next of kin. She in turned passed the GC to her second son, and campaign medals to her third son, Michael.

The George Cross appears to have been sold only a few months later. Michael was just three at the time of his father's death, so never knew his older brother. His interest was reawakened when he discovered that the local council on Ist was planning to erect a memorial.

Michael and other family members subsequently visited Ist in 1988 where they met some of Smith's friends, and a local woman who had been in the house on the night of his death. They visited the site of his first grave, and later visited the cemetery in Belgrade where his body was later moved.

Michael and his son, Jamie, then tried to track down the George Cross; they eventually discovered that it was in the hands of the medal and coin dealers, Spink, and was shortly to be offered for auction. The medal was also being sought by the trustees of the Royal Signals Museum in Blandford, who purchased the medal at auction, Michael was also present when the medal was transferred to them.
