= Independent Regulatory Review Commission =

Agency overview
- Formed: June 25, 1982
- Jurisdiction: Pennsylvania
- Headquarters: Harrisburg, PA
- Website: www.irrc.state.pa.us

The Independent Regulatory Review Commission (IRRC) is an independent agency of the Commonwealth of Pennsylvania. It is responsible for the review of regulations from nearly all state agencies, boards and commissions before they go into effect. These regulations span the broadest possible array of topics, such as bank lending practices, food safety, educational standards, dog breeding, nursing facilities, gaming facilities, and more.

The Regulatory Review Act (RRA), which created IRRC, provides for a forum to examine and resolve differences between the promulgating agency, the legislature and the members of the public that will be directly impacted by these regulations. To accomplish this, IRRC interacts with all parties, frequently advocating changes, where necessary, to accomplish the best regulatory balance. IRRC is statutorily required to ensure proposed regulatory provisions are in the public interest.

Regulations, as well as outside input from the regulated public and the legislature, are reviewed by the professionals at IRRC and made available to all parties on IRRC’s website. The website not only details information about a specific regulation, but catalogs comments from the public, legislators and IRRC in a fully searchable database. Ultimately, the agency’s regulations are considered and voted on by IRRC’s commissioners in a public meeting where all parties can express their support for, or opposition to the regulations. Through IRRC’s efforts, the entire process of a regulation’s evolution is made transparent and accessible to all parties.

== Mission and Purpose ==
Prior to the enactment of the Regulatory Review Act (RRA) in the early 1980s, there were few controls on the promulgation of regulations by state government agencies. According to the Pennsylvania General Assembly, insufficient consideration was given to the economic and social impact the agency regulations would have on those subject to compliance and the public at large. The creation of IRRC established a channel for legislative oversight, a mechanism for detailed and comprehensive impact analysis, and a forum for public input. IRRC's mission is to foster executive branch accountability. IRRC commissioners and staff exercise their expertise, authority, and independence to engage in ongoing and effective review and oversight of regulations. IRRC increases communication with promulgating agencies and the regulated public to achieve a streamlined and effective review process. Ultimately, IRRC assists the Governor and the General Assembly by encouraging the resolution of objections to regulation.

== Rulings ==
=== Net metering ===
In May 2016, IRRC waded into an issue known as net metering. Net metering is a system of selling back electricity to utilities. People and businesses who generate their own electricity from devices such as solar panels can sell back excess power to their local utility company if a net metering setup exists. Laws about net metering vary from state to state. In Pennsylvania, net metering began after enactment of the Alternative Energy Portfolio Standards Act, signed into law in 2004.

In February, the Public Utility Commission set forth the caps on how much electricity solar customers could sell back to utility companies. The caps were set at 200 percent of how much a customer consumes each year. According to the Post-Gazette, IRRC made its decision “after a contentious public rulemaking process.” In their ruling, IRRC struck down the caps that the Public Utilities Commission had set. The main issue before IRRC was whether the Public Utilities Commission had legal authority to set the caps in the first place.
