= List of mayors of Bethlehem, Pennsylvania =

Mayor of Bethlehem, Pennsylvania
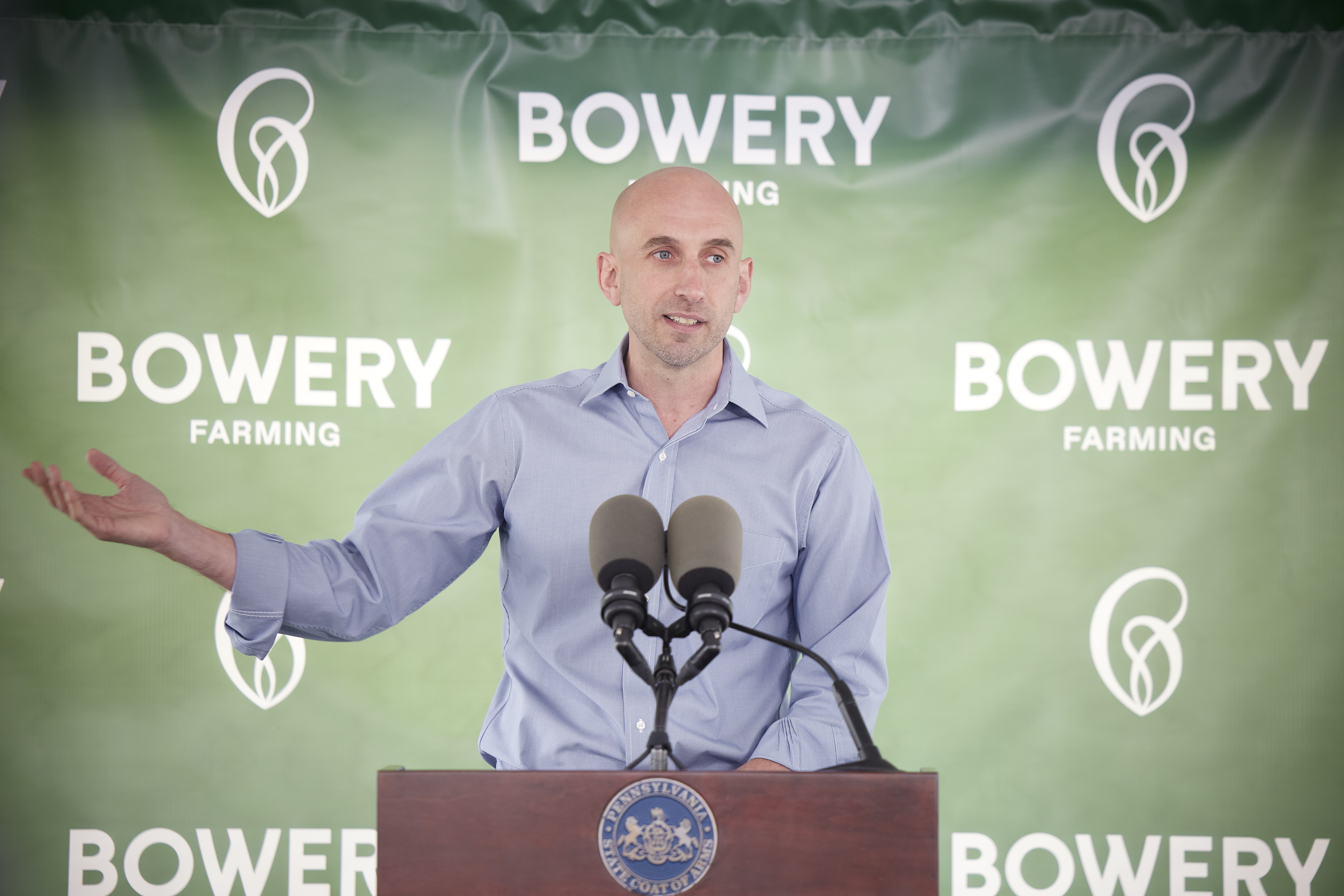
- Incumbent; J. William Reynolds since January 3, 2022
- Term length: Four years; Limited to two consecutive terms
- Inaugural holder: Archibald Johnston
- Formation: 1917
- Website: Office of the Mayor of Bethlehem

The Mayor of Bethlehem, Pennsylvania is a political position dating from 1917, arising from the merger of Borough of Bethlehem and the Borough of South Bethlehem, which came together as the city of Bethlehem. J. William Reynolds is the current mayor having been sworn in on January 3, 2022.

== Separate boroughs ==
An 1886 map of the Bethlehems, showing the separate boroughs

Prior to the unification of Bethlehem and South Bethlehem into a single city, both Bethlehems' executive was known as the Chief Burgess, a title derived from the English office of Burgess which usually denoted the elected official of a municipality. Bethlehem used the title until 1886, while South Bethlehem used the title until 1913. The office would survive in the Borough of Bethlehem, not as the municipalities executive, but rather as the head Magistrate. A Chief Burgess would hold office for a one year term, the length of a session of the city council, and there was no term limits.

=== Borough of Bethlehem Chief Burgess ===
Bethlehem, or North Bethlehem, is the traditional core of Bethlehem, where the original Moravian settlement stood. The oldest of the Bethlehems, its politics was dominated by Moravians until 1880. It was separated from South Bethlehem and Northampton Heights by the Lehigh River and West Bethlehem by the Monocacy Creek.

Name	Party	Term begins	Term ends	Term length	Notes
Charles A. Luckenbach		1845	1846	2 years	First Chief Burgess
John M. Miksch		1847	1848	2 years	First term
E.F. Bleck		1849	1850	2 years	First term
Jacob Wolle		1851	1851	1 year	First term
Jedidiah Weiss		1852	1852	1 year	
E.F. Bleck		1853	1853	1 year	Second term
Philip H. Goepp		1854	1854	1 year	
Benjamin Van Kirk		1855	1856	2 years	
Jacob Wolle		1857	1859	3 years	Second term
Ira Cortright		1860	1861	2 years	
Nathan Bartlett		1862	1862	1 year	
John M. Miksch		1863	1863	1 year	Second term
Charles F. Beckel		1864	1869	5 years	
C.E. Peisert		1870	1870	1 year	
Ambrose J. Erwin		1871	1873 (?)	3(?) years	
George H. Meyers		1880	1887	7 years	Lutheran, first non-Moravian to hold the office.
Jacob B. Kemerer	Democrat	1887	1893	6 years	Presbyterian and local lawyer, later elected to the Pennsylvania State Senate.
Paul Kempsmith		1893	1895	2 years	Lutheran
C.M. Dodson		1895	1897	2 years	Episcopalian
William Edward Martin	Republican	1908	1914	6 Years	A Yale University-educated doctor, active in local trade and industrial boards.
James Yeakel	Democrat	1914	1918	4 Years	Local coachbuilder and councilman, later elected the city's second mayor.

=== Borough of South Bethlehem Chief Burgess ===
During the period of Moravian dominance until 1846, South Bethlehem was where the Moravians housed non-Moravian travelers, building an inn south of the river, allowing outsiders to engage in trade and rest, but also keeping them separated from the settlement. The Moravians also allowed several Huguenot farmers to settle on the south side. It would not be until the end of the American Civil War in 1865 when South Bethlehem would be incorporated as its own borough, expanding southward several times until it bordered Hellertown. It was separated from North and West Bethlehem by the Lehigh River, and was bordered in the northeast by Northampton Heights.

Name	Party	Term begins	Term ends	Term length	Notes
James McMahon	?	1865			Named the borough's first Chief Burgess during its incorporation.
Elisha P. Wilbur				5 years	Sat on South Bethlehem's first borough council for two terms before serving as Chief Burgess for five straight one year terms.
H. Stanley Goodwin	Republican	1875	1892	17 years	Professor at Lehigh University, general superintendent of the Lehigh Valley Railroad. A Republican in a staunchly Democrat borough, local humorists joked the favorite pastime of South Bethlehmites was to stone Republican parades. Died in office in 1892.
Henry Coppée		1894			Professor and First President of Lehigh University. Has a building named after him.
Robert S. Taylor		1905			Professor at Lehigh University.

=== Borough of West Bethlehem Chief Burgess ===
Separated from North Bethlehem by the Monocacy Creek and South Bethlehem by the Lehigh River, during the early history of Bethlehem, the area known as West Bethlehem consisted of the sole chapel and burial ground for non-Moravians, mostly consisting of soldiers from the American Revolutionary War, who died while being treated in the Brothers house when it was repurposed into a hospital. However, starting in 1830, industries such as lumber mills and coal furnaces where constructed by local businessman Timothy Weiss, as well as housing for workers. The community would continue to grow, with a school being built in 1860, and a rail station in 1867, finally by 1886 residents where fed up with paying for taxes to North Bethlehem, and receiving little in return. As such they elected their own rival municipal government on September 16, 1886, and secured incorporation as West Bethlehem on October 25. Until the Borough's annexation by North Bethlehem on August 16, 1904, they too would use the Chief Burgess as their municipal executive.

No.	Name	Term begins	Term ends	Term length	Notes
1st	Marcus C. Fetter	September 16, 1886	1889	3 years	First Chief Burgess of West Bethlehem
2nd	George H. Young	1890	1892	2 years	Won office on a reformist "citizens' ticket."
3rd	Marcus C. Fetter	1893	1897	5 years	Second term.
4th	Leo A. Stem	1898	1900	2 years	Local coal businessman.
5th	J. A. Eberts	1901	1903	3 years	Signed the ordinance agreeing to annexation into Bethlehem.
6th	A. C. Huff	1904	August 16, 1904	1 year	Last Chief Burgess, later Bethlehem's city council president.

=== Borough of Northampton Heights Chief Burgess ===
Northampton Heights was incorporated on February 20, 1901 and at its peak consisted of 280 houses with a population of 1,000. The borough was adamantly against joining South Bethlehem, but not a unified Bethlehem, remaining an independent municipality until October 21, 1918. In 1918 the borough attempted to be annexed by Hellertown, Pennsylvania in order for the new combined municipalities to become a city, however, Bethlehem annexed land between Northampton Heights and Hellertown to prevent this. After being incorporated the neighborhood remained a distinct community until the 60's consisting of a mix of Windish, Hungarian, Russian, Ukrainian, and Pennsylvania Dutch. In 1963 Bethlehem Steel purchased the entire neighborhood and razed it to make an oxygen furnace. Like the other boroughs, Northampton Heights also used the Chief Burgess system.

Name	Party	Term begins	Term ends	Term length	Notes
Harry W. Yost		March 19, 1901			
George Brown			October 21, 1918		

=== Borough of Bethlehem Mayors ===
The Borough of Bethlehem replaced their Chief Burgess with a more traditional mayoral government in 1886.

No.	Mayor	Party	Term begins	Term ends	Term length	Notes
1st	Andrew Harford Boyle	Democratic	1886	1913	27 years	First Mayor of Bethlehem. Born in 1839 in Burtonport, Ireland. He was a successful merchant and engineer before being elected mayor in 1886. He would die in office in 1913.
2nd	Archibald Johnston	Republican	1913	1917	4 years	A Roosevelt Republican and Vice President of Bethlehem Steel, Johnston was the last mayor of the borough of Bethlehem.

=== Borough of South Bethlehem Mayors ===
In 1913 the Borough of South Bethlehem was incorporated as the City of South Bethlehem in an effort to stave off merger with the rest of Bethlehem. With the new municipal government the Chief Burgess was done away with and replaced with a mayoral government. However, the Supreme Court of Pennsylvania determined that the incorporation was unconstitutional and in 1915 the borough of South Bethlehem, and the Chief Burgess, was restored.

No.	Mayor	Term begins	Term ends	Term length	Notes
1st	Mitchell Walter	1913	1915	2 years	The only mayor of South Bethlehem, Dr Mitchell Walter was not a politician, rather coming from a long line of notable local physicians.

== Term limits ==
In October 1973, just before the 15th mayoral election as the city was about to elect its 6th mayor, the council voted in favor of an ordinance limiting Bethlehem mayors to two full four-year terms (in addition to a partial term as an interim mayor if applicable). The ordinance was never submitted to, or challenged by, the voters. At the time, Bethlehem was the only city in Pennsylvania outside of Philadelphia that had term limits for mayor. This ordinance was ruled illegal by the Northampton County Court shortly after and mayor Paul Marcincin, who had voted in favor of the ordinance in 1973 when he was on the city council, used the court ruling to run for a third term in 1985. However, the city council challenged the legality of his third term and the case was brought before the Pennsylvania Supreme Court which, in 1987, struck down the Northampton County Court ruling and restored the 1973 ordinance. Marcincin would step down resulting in the first interim mayor in Bethlehem's history, as well as solidifying the two term limit for mayors.

== Mayors of Bethlehem ==
Number	Mayor	Party	Term begins	Term ends	Term length	Notes
1st	Archibald Johnston	Republican	1917	1921	4 years	A Roosevelt Republican and Vice President of Bethlehem Steel, Johnston was the first mayor of the city of Bethlehem.
2nd	James Yeakel	Democratic	1922	1930	8 years	During Yeakel's term, crime ran rampant in the south side and his indifference resulted in his defeat when seeking a third term.
3rd	Robert Pfeifle	Democrat	1930	1950	20 years	Pennsylvania Dutch, Pfeifle launched a massive campaign to close speakeasies, brothels, and confiscate illegal liquor during Prohibition.
4th	Earl E. Schaffer	Democrat	1950	1962	12 years	Mayor Schaffer planned the construction of a new City Hall complex, expansion of recreation facilities and laid the groundwork for the strong-mayor government, however, none of these would be finished before he left the office.
5th	H. Gordon Payrow, Jr.	Republican	1962	1974	12 years	Mayor Payrow was the first mayor to serve under Bethlehem's strong mayor form of government. Oversaw the construction of the new City Hall and library.
6th	Gordon Mowrer	Democrat	1974	1978	4 years	Mayor Mowrer has been credited with restoring the historic character of Bethlehem and preserving the city's downtown. Under his term Victorian streetlights were introduced.
7th	Paul Marcincin	Democrat	1978	January 14, 1987	9 years	Mayor Marcinin was elected mayor in November 1977 after being a member of city council for 12 years. In 1985 he ran for a third term due to the ambiguity of the legality of the city's term limits. After a lengthy legal battle his third term was deemed illegal and he stepped down.
(Interim)	Gordon Mowrer	Democrat	January 14, 1987	November 1987	10 months	Former Mayor Mowrer was appointed interim mayor by the council when it was determined that Mayor Marcincin's third election was illegal.
8th	Kenneth Smith	Republican	1988	October 1997	9 years	Mayor Smith bore the brunt of the unemployment crisis that followed Bethlehem Steel closing its steel mill. He accepted the post of vice president of public affairs at Lehigh University and resigned four months early.
(Interim)	Paul Marcincin	Democrat	October 1997	January 1998	4 months	Former Mayor Marcincin was appointed interim mayor for the remainder of Smith's term.
9th	Don Cunningham	Democrat	1998	March 2003	5 years	Mayor Cunningham oversaw over $1,000,000,000 in redevelopment of the former Bethlehem Steel plant. He resigned to become Secretary of the Department of General Services under Governor Ed Rendell. He also served as Executive of Lehigh County, Pennsylvania.
(Interim)	James Delgrosso	Democrat	March 12, 2003	January 5, 2004	10 months	James Delgrosso was appointed by the council to serve until a special election could be held. During said election he would be defeated in the Democratic primary.
10th	John B. Callahan	Democrat	January 5, 2004	January 7, 2014	10 years	Mayor Callahan was remembered as "uncompromising" and "abrasive" often clashing with the city council. He was credited with bringing the city 5,000 new jobs and reducing crime by 25%.
11th	Robert Donchez	Democrat	January 6, 2014	January 3, 2022	8 years	Mayor Donchez ran a Technocratic mayoralty, hiring professionals in fields to head specific departments as opposed to staffing his office with politicians.
12th	J. William Reynolds	Democrat	January 3, 2022	Current		A former high school history teacher and city council president, incumbent mayor Reynolds has centered his mayoralty off increasing the standard of living in Bethlehem.

== See also ==
- Bethlehem history
