= Robert Donchez =

American politician

Deputy Director Robert Donchez
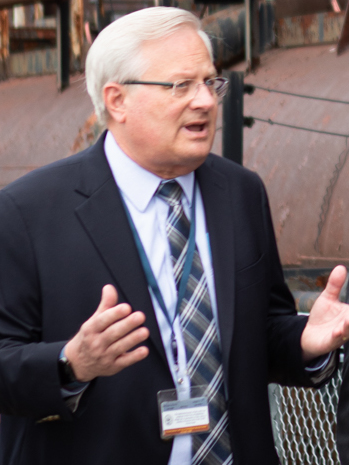

Northampton County Deputy Director of Human Resources
- Incumbent
- Assumed office January 18, 2022

11th Mayor of Bethlehem, Pennsylvania
- In office January 6, 2014 – January 3, 2022
- Preceded by: John B. Callahan
- Succeeded by: J. William Reynolds

Personal details
- Born: March 27, 1950 (age 76) Bethlehem, Pennsylvania
- Party: Democratic Party
- Education: Kutztown University
- Occupation: Educator

Robert "Bob" Donchez is an American politician. He served as a city councilman of Bethlehem, Pennsylvania from 1996 until 2013 and was the city's 11th Mayor from 2013 to 2021. He currently is serving as deputy director of Human Resources for Northampton County.

== Early life ==
Donchez is a lifelong native of Southside Bethlehem. His father was a police officer who died of a heart attack when he was 18. He abandoned his dream of being a lawyer and pursued a teaching degree at Kutztown University in order to support his family.

== Career ==
=== Educator ===
Donchez worked as a social studies teacher at Allen Highschool for 35 years.

=== Bethlehem City Council ===
Donchez got involved in politics by assisting then councilmen Paul Marcincin as his treasurer during the 1976 mayoral race. Marcincin, and his campaign staff, convinced Donchez to run for city council as a Democrat in 1995. Using his background as a teacher he sought to redevelop the decaying Bethlehem Steel plant as well as expanding and funding for the police. He also spearheaded a policy of severing connections between the local government and construction contracts, increasing financial accountability. Throughout his career as a councilmen he was notorious for keeping his political views close to his chest.

=== Mayor of Bethlehem ===
Donchez, 62 years old at the time, decided to run for mayor as the incumbent mayor John B. Callahan had reached his term limits. He centered his primary campaign around his "maturity" compared to his Democratic opponent, J. William Reynolds, who was 30. Despite raising $112,000, 6 times more than Reynolds, he won the Democratic primary by a slim margin of 51.8 percent to 48.2 percent, or 184 individual votes. The Republican Party failed to file a candidate besides an unsuccessful, marginal, write-in campaign, meaning the primary was treated as the election proper. As mayor he modeled his mayorship around the technocratic mayorship of his mentor Marcincin, hiring professionals in various fields, and delegating to them committees on these fields. A large component of his mayorship would be his fiscal responsibility plan, a resumption of his work in the city council. The plan sought to streamline the city's budget, and cut unnecessary expenses, saving the city approximately $100,000 annually. He ran for a second term in 2017, and faced no opposition from the Democratic Party. He based his second term in office around taxation, vowing to not increase taxes in Bethlehem. In order to do so he slashed roughly $400,000 from the city's budget and drastically reduced the number of city employees. However, he did have to increase the budget to reform the Bethlehem area 9-1-1 dispatch center, turning it into a regional dispatch hub. He was unable to run for a third term due to term limits.

=== Post Mayoral career ===
Shortly after exiting office, Northampton county executive Lamont McClure named Donchez as his deputy director of human resources.
