= John Stoffa =

American politician from Northampton County, Pennsylvania

Northampton County Commissioner
- In office 2006–2014
- Preceded by: Glenn Reibman
- Succeeded by: John Brown

Personal details
- Born: December 20, 1939 Allen Township, Pennsylvania, U.S.
- Died: May 2, 2022 (aged 82) Allentown, Pennsylvania, U.S.
- Party: Democratic
- Spouse: Barbara Gallagher Stoffa
- Children: Jeffrey D. Stoffa; Gregory J. Stoffa
- Education: Pennsylvania State University; Kutztown University of Pennsylvania

Military service
- Branch/service: United States Army
- Rank: Sergeant

John Stoffa was an American politician who served as County Executive of Northampton County, Pennsylvania from 2006 to 2014. He was elected to the office at the age of 65 as a conservative Democrat.

== Early life and education ==
Stoffa graduated from the Nesquehoning High School in Nesquehoning, Pennsylvania and Pennsylvania State University before earning a master's degree at Kutztown University of Pennsylvania. Stoffa served three years of active duty in the U.S. Army and two years in the reserves. Stoffa achieved the rank of Sergeant as a tank commander. Stoffa was also active in the Lehigh Valley band scene, being an avid trumpeter, frequently organizing concerts throughout his life and supporting local marching bands.

== Political career ==
Stoffa spent several decades in the human services field. He first served as director of human services in Lehigh County and later was appointed to the same position in neighboring Northampton County. Prior to his election to county executive, Stoffa's only experience in political office was a single term on the Northampton Area School Board. In 2001, he was defeated in a race for a seat on the Northampton county council, but four years later won a primary battle for Northampton county executive, defeating incumbent fellow Democrat Glenn Reibman by a margin of 52-47. Stoffa went on to win the general election.

During his tenure as head of the county's government, Stoffa worked closely with Don Cunningham, his counterpart in Lehigh County, on issues affecting the Lehigh Valley as a whole. One of Stoffa's key issues was the preservation of farmland, at one point promising to raise taxes to do so. Despite this, he won re-election in 2009. Stoffa decided not to seek a third term and retired in 2014.

== Legacy ==
Stoffa was known for his bi-partisanship as well as his desire to help the citizens of Northampton County. He is also remembered for his support of Green spaces throughout the county. McClure stated that Stoffa's role in bridging partisan disputes helped the council pass legislation and ordinances aimed at improving the lives of Lehigh Valley residents, including expanding the county's Human Services department.

During his lifetime, Stoffa served on the boards of over 40 nonprofit organizations in the Lehigh Valley including United Way, American Red Cross, New Bethany, Cities in Schools, Keenan House drug treatment center, Community Action Committee of the Lehigh Valley, Turning Point, and Downtown Allentown Kiwanis Club.

== Death ==
Stoffa lived on a farm in Allen Township, Pennsylvania with his wife Barbara. They had two sons. Stoffa died on May 2, 2022, at the Lehigh Valley Hospital-Muhlenberg hospital at the age of 82. Following his death, sitting Northampton county executive, Lamont McClure, ordered flags to be flown at half mast for mourning.
