= Don Cunningham =

American politician and public sector executive

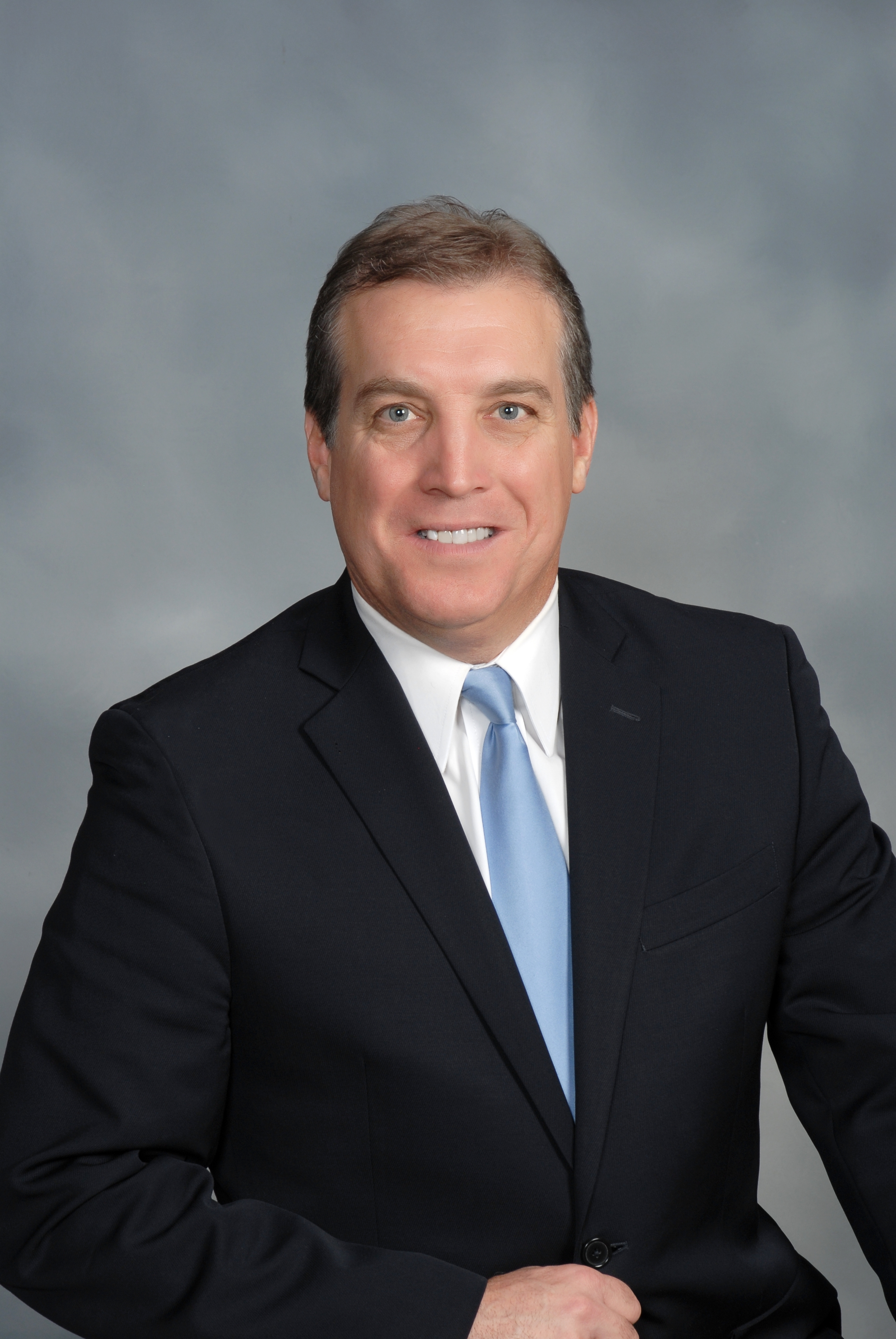
- Cunningham in 2012

Executive of Lehigh County, Pennsylvania
- In office 2006–2012
- Preceded by: Jane Ervin
- Succeeded by: Bill Hansell

Pennsylvania Secretary of General Services
- In office 2003–2005
- Succeeded by: James Creedon

9th Mayor of Bethlehem, Pennsylvania
- In office 1998–2003
- Preceded by: Paul Marcincin
- Succeeded by: James Delgrosso

Bethlehem City Councilman
- In office 1996–1997
- Preceded by: Richard Szulborski
- Succeeded by: Magdalena Szabo

Personal details
- Born: December 13, 1965 (age 60) Bethlehem, Pennsylvania, U.S.
- Party: Democratic Party

Donald Cunningham Jr. (born December 13, 1965) is an American politician who is president and CEO of the Lehigh Valley Economic Development Corporation (LVEDC). He previously served as executive of Lehigh County, Pennsylvania, secretary of the Pennsylvania Department of General Services, and mayor of Bethlehem, Pennsylvania.

Cunningham is credited with leading an economic renaissance in Bethlehem, rejuvenating the city's two downtowns and helping kick-start Bethlehem's economy after the collapse of Bethlehem Steel. As Lehigh County executive, Cunningham restructured county operations to make economic growth and community regionalization the focus of his administration.

== Early life and career ==
Don Cunningham Jr. was born on December 13, 1965, to parents Don Sr. and Valerie Cunningham. His family had lived in Bethlehem, Pennsylvania for five generations, and his father and grandfather were both steel workers at Bethlehem Steel. He graduated from the Freedom High School in 1983. During his time at Freedom he played football, ran track, worked on the student newspaper, and was the front man for a teenage rock band. Cunningham was inducted into the School's hall of fame in 2001.

Cunningham went to Shippensburg University and earned a Bachelor of Arts in Journalism and a minor in government in 1987. He completed a Master of Arts Degree in political science from Villanova University in 1991.

Cunningham worked as a correspondent with The Philadelphia Inquirer and as a reporter with the Globe-Times of Bethlehem from 1988 to 1992, covering city government. He then worked as a spokesman for Moravian College from 1992 to 1993 and as an information specialist at the PPL Corporation in Allentown, Pennsylvania.

== Political career ==
In 1995, Cunningham was elected to Bethlehem City Council along with two other political newcomers, Democrats Robert Donchez and James Gregory, defeating two veteran councilmen in what The Morning Call newspaper called "a new era for City Democrats". He served as chairman of the council's Parks and Public Property Committee. In January 1997, during his first council term, Cunningham announced his intention to run for mayor, a post held since 1988 by Ken Smith. Donchez served as his campaign chairman. His candidacy was supported by U.S. Rep Paul McHale and Pennsylvania Rep. T. J. Rooney. Cunningham defeated Marakovits in the Democratic primary by a vote count of 3,384 to 2,916, and went on to face Republican Councilman Otto Ehrsam in the general election. Ehrsham was a 67-year-old Bethlehem Steel retiree who had been on council for 20 years. He was elected with 62 percent of the vote, collecting 6,336 to Ehrsam's 3,919 votes. The Morning Call called it "one of the most decisive victories in a Bethlehem mayoral race". Voter turnout was approximately 50 percent. At age 31, Cunningham became the youngest elected mayor in the city's history. Cunningham was re-elected to a second term in 2001.

Cunningham was inaugurated not long after the city's largest employer, Bethlehem Steel, had closed, resulting in the loss of thousands of jobs and a significant portion the city's tax base. During his tenure, Cunningham guided more than $1 billion of new development and the creation of 2,500 new jobs into the city. As mayor, Cunningham proposed five city budgets, only one of which had a tax increase in his final year in the office. Cunningham advocated public-private partnerships and developed new programs to improve public safety and the delivery of neighborhood services.

=== Secretary of General Services ===
Cunningham became a short-list candidate for the cabinet of Governor Ed Rendell. Initial discussions centered around the secretary position for the Department of Community and Economic Development. Cunningham said he had modeled his administration's economic development plan in part after the prototype Rendell used as mayor of Philadelphia. In January 2003, it was announced Rendell had tapped Cunningham for the Department of General Services. Cunningham oversaw $4 billion of Pennsylvania's budget, including his department's own budget of $141.6 million. Within his first month in the post, Rendell tasked him with reducing that budget by 10 percent.

Cunningham oversaw the design and construction of the non-highway capital construction projects in Pennsylvania, as well as the state's minority and women-owned business contracting program and the Bureau of Commonwealth Media Services. In addition to his secretary position, Cunningham served on the State Public School Building Authority, the Pennsylvania Higher Educational Facilities Authority, the Governor's Homeland Security Advisory Council, the PENNVEST board, the Capitol Preservation Committee, and the Agricultural Land Preservation Interagency Committee during his time in Rendell's administration.

=== Lehigh Valley positions ===
Starting in early 2005, Cunningham was courted by Lehigh Valley Democrats to run for executive of Lehigh County. No Democrat had won the executive's office since the county's home rule charter went into effect in 1978, and Lehigh County Democratic Committee Chairman Charles F. Smith Jr. called Cunningham the party's "dream candidate". Cunningham announced his candidacy for the position in March, and formally resigned from the Rendell administration on April 8. He ran with no opposition in the Democratic primary, clearing the way for a challenge against Republican Executive Jane R. Ervin, who was seeking a second four-year term. During his campaign, Cunningham criticized Ervin for a 69 percent county tax increase in 2003, calling it "unconscionable" and declaring that a change in leadership was necessary. Ervin responded aggressively to Cunningham's campaign, raising questions about his record in Bethlehem and Rendell's administration and defending her tax increase as the right thing to do for the county. Cunningham defeated Ervin by 33,263 to 20,721, with 62 percent of the vote, becoming the first Democrat ever elected to the executive post. He had spent roughly $500,000 in the election.

Several major development projects and corporate relocations came to fruition during Cunningham's tenure, including the Boston Beer Company establishing their largest brewery in Upper Macungie Township, Olympus Corporation opening its headquarters in Upper Saucon Township; Ocean Spray establishing manufacturing operation in Upper Macungie Township; and Coca-Cola Park, the baseball stadium for the Lehigh Valley IronPigs, opening in Allentown. Cunningham also funded open space preservation, negotiated contracts to stem rising health care costs, and helped municipalities with higher crime rates hire more police officers.

In 2007, Cunningham endorsed Hillary Clinton in her campaign for U.S. President. In April 2008, Cunningham was the top vote-getter in the 15th congressional district to serve as a delegate Hillary Clinton to the 2008 Democratic National Convention. Cunningham announced as early as 2007 that he was considering a run for Pennsylvania governor in 2010. However, in June 2009, he announced he would not seek the post due to family concerns and time restraint. Cunningham had raised about $725,000 for the possible campaign by that point.

In 2009, Cunningham was challenged in his re-election campaign by Scott Ott, a Republican political newcomer associated with the conservative Tea Party movement. Ott accused Cunningham of avoiding a county tax increase only by depleting a tax relief fund established during Jane Ervin's administration, leaving the county in a position where future tax hikes would be necessary. Cunningham accused Ott of using scare tactics in his campaign and said he lacked the experience to lead the county. He also argued Republican county commissioners had actually increased spending. Cunningham defeated Ott in the general election by a voter count of 21,063 to 20,201, capturing 51 percent of the vote to Ott's 49 percent. In 2010, a 16.1 percent tax increase was proposed as part of the county budget, with Cunningham said was necessary due to difficult financial times, but would avoid the need to sell assets, deplete savings, impose massive layoffs, or reduce government services to the point that the problem would grow worse in subsequent years. It was the first county tax increase since 2003. The budget was ultimately passed. In 2011, Ott was elected to the county's board of commissioners, along with a slate of fellow conservatives who ran together on a ticket of reform, which heavily criticized the 16 percent county tax increase during their campaigns.

Although the board had always been Republican-majority during Cunningham's tenure, he had a particularly difficult relationship with the commissioners after the 2011 election. Cunningham unsuccessfully attempted to veto a county-wide reassessment that commissioners approved, arguing it should have been delayed at least a year to allow time for the market to become less volatile.

In May 2012, Cunningham accepted the position of president and CEO of the Lehigh Valley Economic Development Council, resigning as Lehigh County executive with a year-and-a-half remaining in his second term.
