= Buds (Ovlov album) =

Studio album by Ovlov
- Released: November 19, 2021
- Studios: Black Lodge Studios, Brooklyn
- Genres: Indie rock; rock
- Length: 24:00
- Label: Exploding in Sound
- Producer: Michael John Thomas III

Ovlov chronology
Tru (2018)	Buds (2021)

Singles from Buds
- 1. "Land of Steve-O" Released: September 22, 2021

Professional ratings
Aggregate scores
Source	Rating
Metacritic	83/100
Review scores
Source	Rating
AllMusic	4/5 stars
No Ripcord	9/10
Paste	7.4/10
Pitchfork	7.6/10

Buds is the third studio album by American band Ovlov. It was released on November 19, 2021, by Exploding in Sound.

== Release ==
On September 22, 2021, Ovlov announced the release of their third studio, along with the first single "Land of Steve-O".

== Critical reception ==
Buds was met with "universal acclaim" reviews from critics. At Metacritic, which assigns a weighted average rating out of 100 to reviews from mainstream publications, this release received an average score of 83 based on 5 reviews.

In a review for AllMusic, critic reviewer Tim Sendra said: "For 2021's Buds Steve Hartlett dug through old demos to find songs that were deemed too light at the time, plus he wrote a few that fit the brief. The result is a little lighter than TRU, but it's hardly featherweight. There are plenty of blown-out guitars and ripping leads, the rhythm section still pounds like they are trying to escape a locked room, and Harlett ladles lots of goopy melancholy into the melodies. Buds totally sounds and feels like Ovlov." Brian Coney of Pitchfork explained: "In the space of 25 minutes, Buds continues to navigate loss while sounding largely at peace with the world. With brothers Jon and Theo Hartlett on bass and drums and childhood friend Morgan Luzzi on guitar, Hartlett crafts Ovlov's breeziest record yet. It's still wooly and doused in fuzz, but the band sounds more lucid than ever before."

At Paste, the album received a rating of 7.4 out of 10, with reviewer Ben Salmon noting: "On their third album Buds, Ovlov scale back the squall a bit and bring those tunes to the forefront. Don't misunderstand: Hartlett and his crew still know how to dial up the fuzz, as they do with great gusto on the album's punky, 98-second opening track, "Baby Shea". But on Buds, they deploy it with more restraint, giving space to cleaner tones that jangle and chime, and to Hartlett's charming melodies.

== Track listing ==
Buds track listing
No.	Title	Length
1.	"Baby Shea"	1:37
2.	"Eat More"	4:15
3.	"Land of Steve-O"	2:50
4.	"The Wishing Well"	1:58
5.	"Strokes"	2:11
6.	"Cheer Up, Chihiro!"	4:30
7.	"Moron, Pt. 2"	2:15
8.	"Feel the Pain"	4:48
