= Tru (Ovlov album) =

Studio album by Ovlov
- Released: July 20, 2018
- Recorded: 2017 (Note: In an interview with The Alternative published on 17 July 2018, Steve Hartlett, vocalist, songwriter and guitarist of Ovlov, said the album was recorded "like a year and a half ago".)
- Studio: Black Lodge, Brooklyn, New York City
- Genre: Indie rock; alternative rock; lo-fi; pop punk; shoegaze
- Length: 30:26
- Label: Exploding in Sound

Ovlov chronology
Greatest Hits Vol. II (2017)	Tru (2018)	Buds (2021)

Tru is the second studio album by American band Ovlov, released on July 20, 2018, via Exploding in Sound Records. After releasing their first studio album, Am (2013), the band had temporary break-ups, but eventually re-emerged. Tru was recorded around late 2016 and early 2017, and two singles were premiered before its official release. The album received "universal acclaim" according to review aggregator Metacritic.

== Background and release ==
After the release of the band's debut studio album, Am (2013), Ovlov went through a series of temporary break-ups. However, the band started to reemerge, playing some shows and releasing the Greatest Hits Vol. II collection in 2017.

Steve Hartlett, vocalist, songwriter and guitarist of Ovlov, has said that the majority of the songs were written around 2015 or 2016, but some were demos for the first record from around 2011 or 2012. The album was recorded around late 2016 or early 2017.

On May 21, 2018, they premiered the album's lead single, "Spright", via Stereogum. They also premiered "Short Morgan" on June 11, 2018, via The Fader. The album was fully released on July 20, 2018, via Exploding in Sounds Records.

== Composition ==
Tru has been called as an album from the genres indie rock, alternative rock, lo-fi and pop-punk. Pitchfork said that the track "Spright" is "slower and softer" than other Ovlov songs, and described it as a "gentler shoegaze".

== Critical reception ==
Professional ratings
Aggregate scores
Source	Rating
AnyDecentMusic?	7.2
Metacritic	86/100
Review scores
Source	Rating
AllMusic	4.5/5 stars
Earbuddy	6.5/10
No Ripcord	8/10
Pitchfork	7.8/10
The Skinny	3/5 stars

Tru was met with generally positive reviews from critics. On the review aggregators Metacritic and AnyDecentMusic?, the album received a weighted average score of, respectively, 86/100 (indicating "universal acclaim") and 7.2.

== Track listing ==
Adapted from Bandcamp.

1. "Baby Alligator" – 4:27
2. "Half Way Fine" – 3:27
3. "The Best Of You" – 2:04
4. "Spright" – 2:40
5. "Stick" – 3:22
6. "Tru Punk" – 3:34
7. "Fast G" – 2:42
8. "Short Morgan" – 2:00
9. "Grab It From The Garden" – 6:10

== Personnel ==
Adapted from Bandcamp.

- Michael John Thomas III - guitar solo (track 9), engineering (tracks 3, 6, 7, 8 & 9), mixing & mastering (all)
- Jesse Weiss - engineering (tracks 1, 2, 4 & 5)
- Alec and Jack Pombriant - co-engineering (tracks 1, 2, 4 & 5)
- Steve Hartlett - vocals, guitar, bass, synth (track 3)
- Theo Hartlett - vocals (tracks 1, 2, 4 & 5), drums, (track 5), guitar (track 9)
- Morgan Luzzi - guitar (all), vocals (tracks 1, 2, 4 & 5)
- Michael Hammond Jr. - bass, guitar (track 3)
- Erin McGrath - vocals (track 1)
