= Cusp (band) =

Cusp is an American indie rock band from Rochester, New York now based in Chicago, Illinois. The group consists of Jen Bender (vocals, guitar), Gaelen Bates (Guitar), Matt Manes (bass), Tommy Moore (drums, percussion, vocals) and Tessa O'Connell (vocals, piano, synths).

In 2023, the group self-released their debut album titled You Can Do It All. The album received a 7.3 from Pitchfork. The band released an EP in 2024 titled Thanks So Much. In 2025, the band released their second full-length album titled What I Want Doesn't Want Me Back. The album was released through Exploding in Sound. The album received a 7.6 rating from Pitchfork. The album was ranked #15 on Pitchfork's "The 30 Best Albums of 2025" list.

== Discography ==
Studio albums

- You Can Do It All (2023, self-titled)
- What I Want Doesn't Want Me Back (2025, Exploding in Sound Records)

EPs

- Thanks So Much (2024)
