= Floatie (band) =

American band

Floatie is an American math rock band from Chicago, Illinois. The group is currently signed to Exploding in Sound. The band consists of Sam Bern (vocals/guitar), Luc Schutz (drums), Joe Olson (vocals/bass), and Will Wisniewski (guitar/synth).

== History ==
After playing together for many years, Floatie was officially formed in 2018. However, Bern, Olson, and Schutz had been writing music under the title Floatie as early as 2017. Three of the members previously played together in the band Spooky Action Space Captain. The band recorded their debut album in winter 2019 with plans to release it the following year, but had to delay its release due to the COVID-19 pandemic. The band released their debut album, Voyage Out, in 2021. The album received positive reviews. The groups song "Castleman" was inspired by The Count of Monte Cristo. The groups song "Catch a Good Worm" was one of Bob Boilen's favorite songs of the week on All Songs Considered.
