= Ovlov =

American rock band

- Origin: Newtown, Connecticut, U.S.
- Genres: Shoegaze; slacker rock; noise pop; emo; post-hardcore; grungegaze
- Years active: 2009–present
- Label: Exploding in Sound
- Members: Steve Hartlett; Morgan Luzzi; Jon Hartlett; Theo Hartlett

Ovlov is an American alternative rock band from Newtown, Connecticut.

== History ==
Ovlov began in 2009, choosing a band name that is an inversion of the Swedish car brand, Volvo. That same year, they released an EP titled Crazy Motorcycle Jump. They followed that up with another EP in 2011 titled What's So Great About The City. In 2013, Ovlov released their first full-length album on Exploding in Sound titled Am. In August 2014, Ovlov released a split with Little Big League. Two months later, the band released a split with Krill, LVL UP, and Radiator Hospital. In 2018, Ovlov released their second full-length album on Exploding in Sound titled Tru. Ovlov released their third full-length album, Buds, in 2021.

== Style ==
Ovlov's songs have been characterized as "melancholy" and are said to fuse "the overloaded guitar attack and rhythmic power of vintage Dinosaur Jr. with the winsome songcraft of Built to Spill." The band is said to have evolved towards a poppier style on later releases.

== Discography ==
Studio Albums

- Am (2013)
- Tru (2018)
- Buds (2021)

EPs

- Crazy Motorcycle Jump (2009)
- Not the Same Without You (2010)
- What's So Great About the City (2011)

Splits

- Ovlov/Little Big League (2014)
- Ovlov/Radiator Hospital/Krill/LVL UP (2014)
- Ovlov/Ex-Breathers/Woozy/Gnarwhal (2014)

Compilations

- Greatest Hits Vol. II (2017)
