= Bethlehem Steel =

American steel company (1857–2009)

Bethlehem Steel Corporation
- Type: Public
- Traded as: NYSE: BS; DJIA component (until 1997); S&P 500 component (1957-2000); S&P 400 component (2000-2003)
- Industry: Steel, shipbuilding, mining
- Founded: 1857 (roots); 1899 (as Bethlehem Steel Company); 1904 (as Bethlehem Steel Corporation)
- Founder: Augustus Wolle
- Defunct: 2003; 23 years ago
- Fate: Bankruptcy and liquidation
- Successor: Cleveland-Cliffs (2020–present); ArcelorMittal (2006–2020); Mittal Steel Company (2005–2006); International Steel Group (2003–2005)
- Headquarters: Martin Tower, Bethlehem, Pennsylvania, U.S.
- Subsidiaries: Bethlehem Steel Company; Bethlehem Shipbuilding Corporation
- Website: Archived 31 March 2002 at the Wayback Machine

The Bethlehem Steel Corporation was an American steelmaking company headquartered in Bethlehem, Pennsylvania. Until its closure in 2003, it was one of the world's largest steel-producing and shipbuilding companies. At the height of its success and productivity, the company was a symbol of American manufacturing leadership in the world, and its decline and ultimate bankruptcy and liquidation in the late 20th century is similarly cited as an example of America's diminished manufacturing leadership during the late 20th century. From its founding in 1857 through its 2003 dissolution, Bethlehem Steel's headquarters were based in Bethlehem, Pennsylvania, in the Lehigh Valley region of eastern Pennsylvania. Its primary steel mill manufacturing facilities were located in Bethlehem, Pennsylvania, and were later expanded to include a major research laboratory in Bethlehem, and various additional manufacturing plants in Sparrows Point, Maryland; Johnstown, Pennsylvania; Lackawanna, New York; and Burns Harbor, Indiana.

The company's steel was used in the construction of many of the nation's largest and most famed structures. Among major buildings, Bethlehem produced steel for 28 Liberty Street, the Empire State Building, Madison Square Garden, Rockefeller Center, and the Waldorf Astoria hotel in New York City and Merchandise Mart in Chicago. Among major bridges, Bethlehem's steel was used in constructing the George Washington Bridge and Verrazzano–Narrows Bridge in New York City, the Golden Gate Bridge in San Francisco, and the Peace Bridge between Buffalo and Fort Erie, Ontario.

Bethlehem Steel played an instrumental role in manufacturing the U.S. warships and other military weapons used in World War I and later by Allied forces in ultimately winning World War II. Over 1,100 Bethlehem Steel-manufactured warships were built for use in defeating Nazi Germany and the Axis powers in World War II. Historians cite Bethlehem Steel's ability to quickly manufacture warships and other military equipment as decisive factors in American victories in both world wars.

Bethlehem Steel's roots trace to an iron-making company organized in 1857 in Bethlehem, later named the Bethlehem Iron Company. In 1899, the owners of the iron company founded Bethlehem Steel Company and, five years later, Bethlehem Steel Corporation was created to be the steelmaking company's corporate parent.

Bethlehem Steel survived the earliest declines in the American steel industry beginning in the 1970s. In 1982, however, the company suspended most of its steelmaking operations after posting a loss of $1.5 billion, attributable to increased foreign competition, rising labor and pensions costs, and other factors. The company filed for bankruptcy in 2001, and was dissolved in 2003 after its remaining assets were sold to International Steel Group.

== History ==
=== 19th century ===
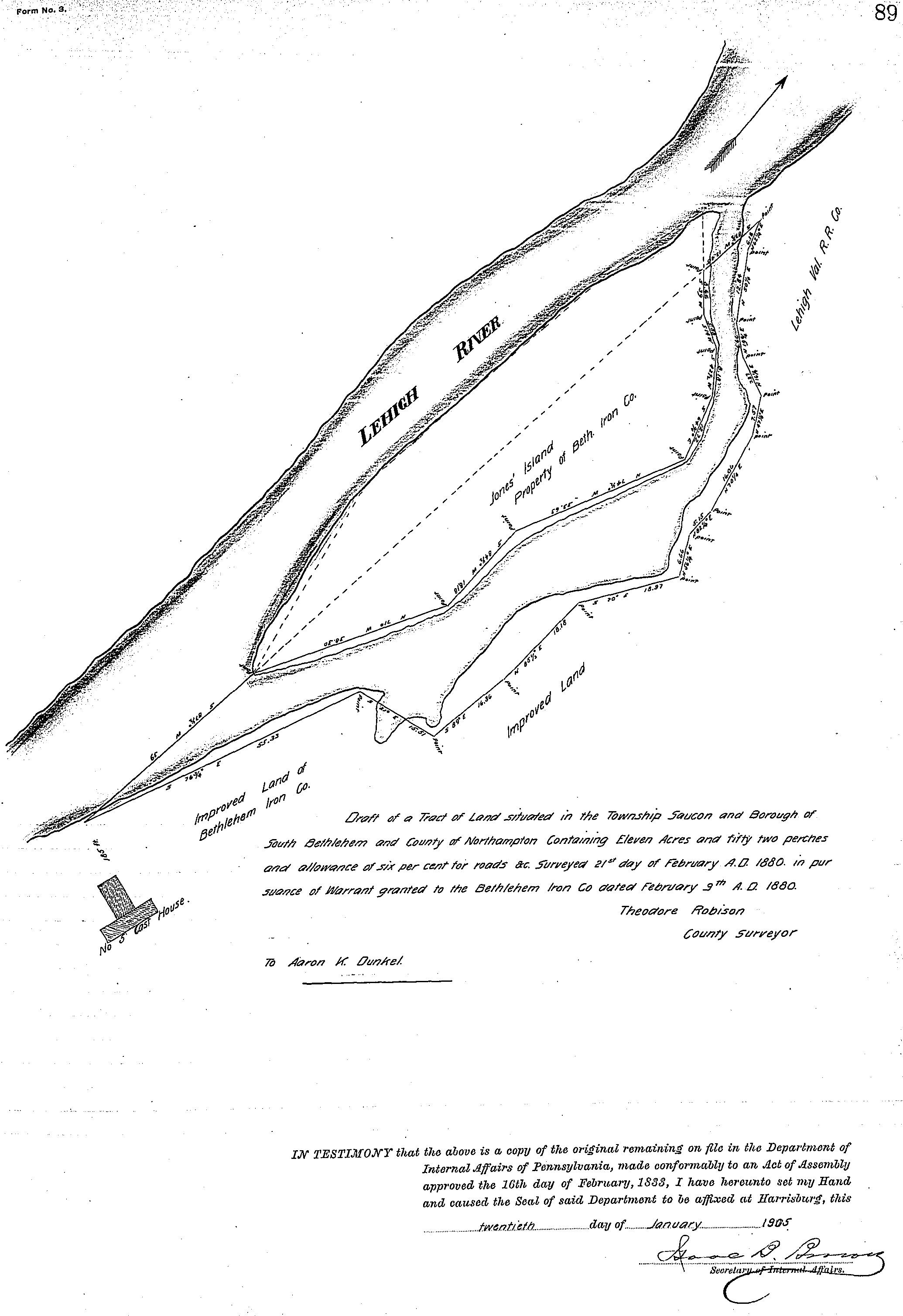
A February 1880 illustration of the eleven acres of land issued to Bethlehem Steel by present-day three local jurisdictions, Lower Saucon Township, South Bethlehem, and Northampton County

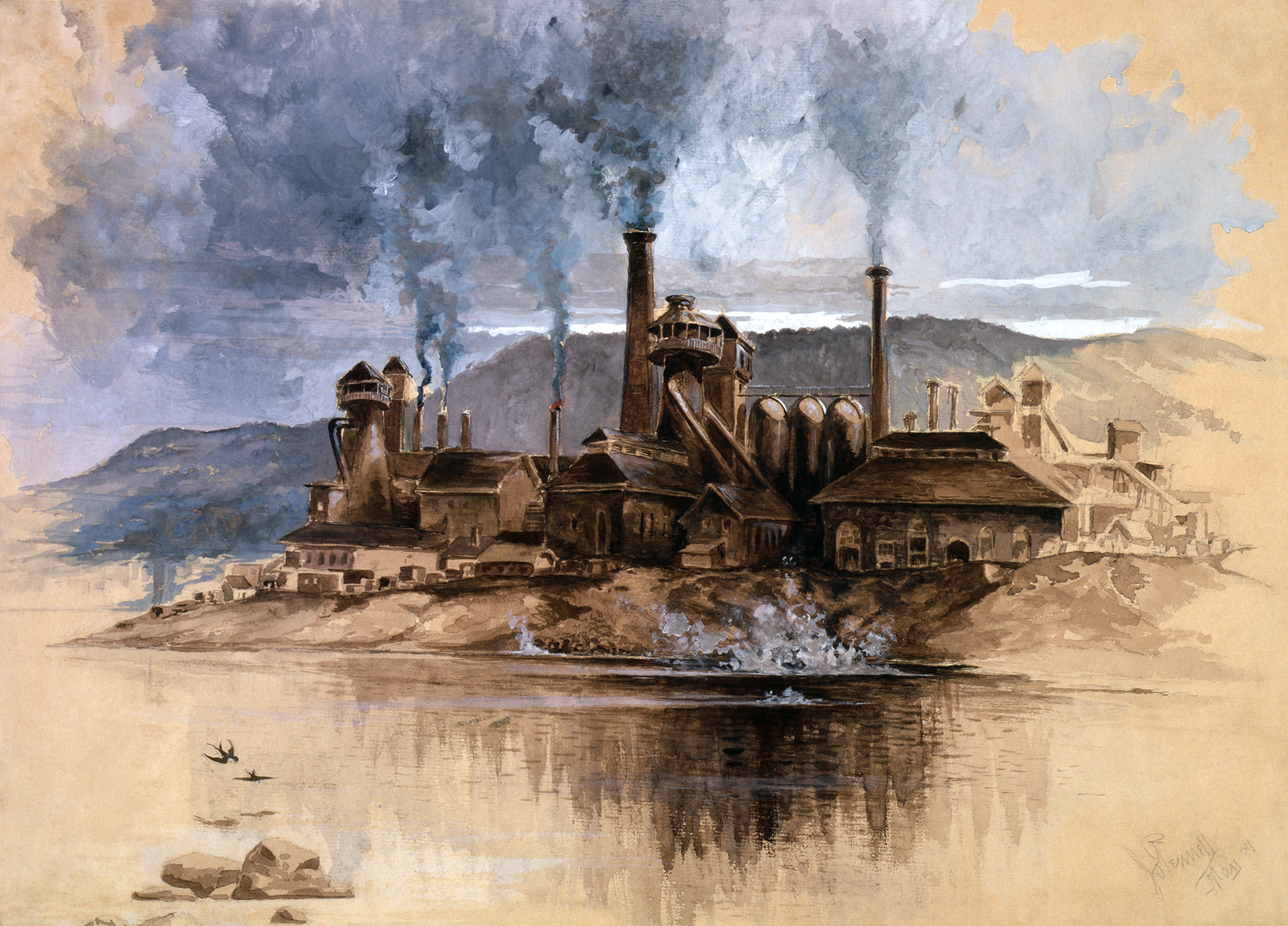
Bethlehem Steel Works, an 1881 watercolor by Joseph Pennell

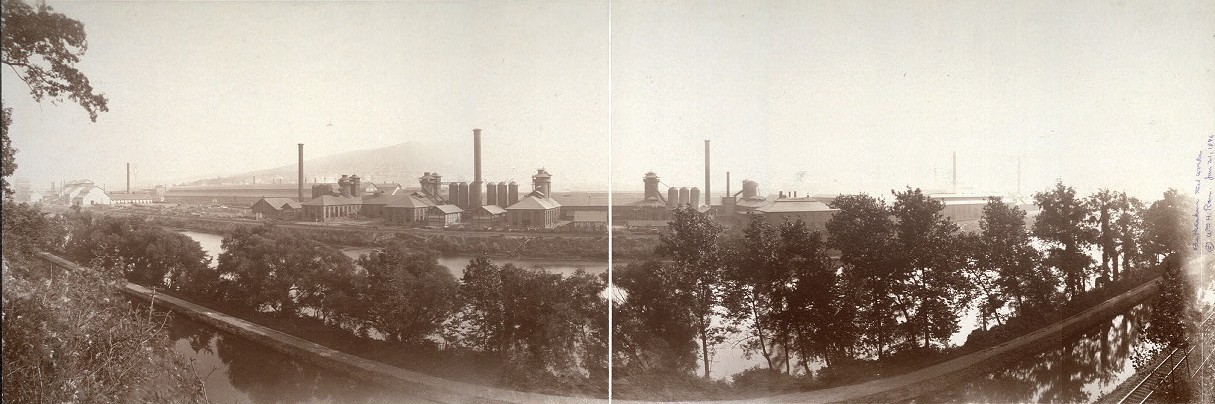
The Bethlehem Steel plant in Bethlehem, Pennsylvania, photographed by William H. Rau in 1896

In 1857, the first iron works in Bethlehem, Pennsylvania, was launched as the Saucona Iron Company by Augustus Wolle. That same year, the Panic of 1857, a national financial crisis, halted the company's further organization. Another organization subsequently started, its site moved elsewhere to South Bethlehem, and the company's name was changed to the Bethlehem Rolling Mill and Iron Company. On June 14, 1860, the board of directors of the fledgling company elected Alfred Hunt president.

On May 1, 1861, the company's name was changed to the Bethlehem Iron Company. Construction of the first blast furnace began on July 1, 1861, and was operationalized on January 4, 1863. The first rolling mill was built between the spring of 1861 and the summer of 1863 with the first railroad rails being rolled on September 26, 1863. A machine shop, in 1865, and another blast furnace, in 1867, were completed. During its early years, the company produced rails for the rapidly expanding railroads and armor plating used by the U.S. Navy.

The company continued to prosper during the early 1880s, but its share of the rail market began to decline in the face of competition from growing Pittsburgh and Scranton-based firms, such as the Carnegie Steel Company and Lackawanna Steel. The nation's decision to rebuild the Navy with steam-driven, steel-hulled warships reshaped Bethlehem Iron Company's destiny.

Following the American Civil War, the U.S. Navy quickly downsized after the end of hostilities, and national focus was redirected toward settling the West and rebuilding the war-ravaged South. Almost no new ordnance was produced, and new technology was neglected. By 1881, international incidents highlighted the poor condition of the U.S. fleet and the need to rebuild it to protect U.S. military capabilities, trade, and prestige.

In 1883, U.S. secretary of the Navy William E. Chandler and U.S. secretary of war Robert Todd Lincoln appointed Lt. William Jaques to the Gun Foundry Board, and Jaques was sent on several fact-finding tours of European armament makers. On one of these trips, he formed business ties with the firm of Joseph Whitworth in Manchester, England. He returned to the U.S. as Whitworth's agent and, in 1885, was granted an extended furlough to pursue this personal interest.

Jaques was aware that the U.S. Navy would soon solicit bids for the production of heavy guns and other products such as armor that would be needed to further expand the fleet, and he contacted the Bethlehem Iron Company with a proposal to serve as an intermediary between it and the Whitworth Company, so Bethlehem Iron could erect a heavy forging plant to produce ordnance.

In 1885, John F. Fritz, sometimes referred to as the father of the U.S. steel industry, accompanied Bethlehem Iron directors Robert H. Sayre, Elisha Packer Wilbur, president of Lehigh Valley Railroad, William Thurston, and Joseph Wharton, founder of the Wharton School, to meet with Jaques in Philadelphia. In early 1886, Bethlehem Iron and the Whitworth Company executed a contract.

In the spring 1886, Congress passed a naval appropriations bill that authorized the construction of two armored second-class battleships, one protected cruiser, one first-class torpedo boat, and the complete rebuilding and modernization of two Civil War-era monitors. The two second-class battleships, the USS Texas and the USS Maine, both had large-caliber guns with 12-inch and 10-inch, respectively, and heavy armor plating. Bethlehem secured both the forging and armor contracts on June 28, 1887.

Between 1888 and 1892, the Bethlehem Iron Company completed the first U.S. heavy-forging plant, which was designed by John Fritz with assistance from Russell Davenport, who joined Bethlehem Iron in 1888. By fall 1890, Bethlehem Iron was delivering gun forging to the U.S. Navy and was completing facilities to provide armor plating.

For the 1893 Chicago World's Fair, Bethlehem Iron Company provided the steel used in the creation of a 45.5-foot steel axle to support the world's first Ferris wheel, a 264-foot (80 m) structure. The iron was manufactured in Bethlehem Iron Company's blast furnaces converted to steel in their Open Hearth furnaces, then forged. It represented the largest single steel forging ever constructed at the time.

In 1898, Frederick Winslow Taylor joined the Bethlehem Iron Company as a management consultant charged with solving the company's expensive machine shop capacity challenge.

The Bethlehem Iron Company was very successful and profitable, and the company's corporate management believed that it could be even more profitable. To accomplish this, the corporate ownership of the Bethlehem Iron Company switched to steel production, and the company's name was formally changed to Bethlehem Steel Company.

==== Bethlehem Steel Company ====
In 1899, Bethlehem Steel Company was established. Bethlehem Steel Company, also then known as Bethlehem Steel Works, was incorporated to take over all liabilities of the Bethlehem Iron Company. Bethlehem Iron Company and the Bethlehem Steel Company operated as separate companies under the same ownership. Bethlehem Steel Company leased the properties, which were owned by the Bethlehem Iron Company.

=== 20th century ===
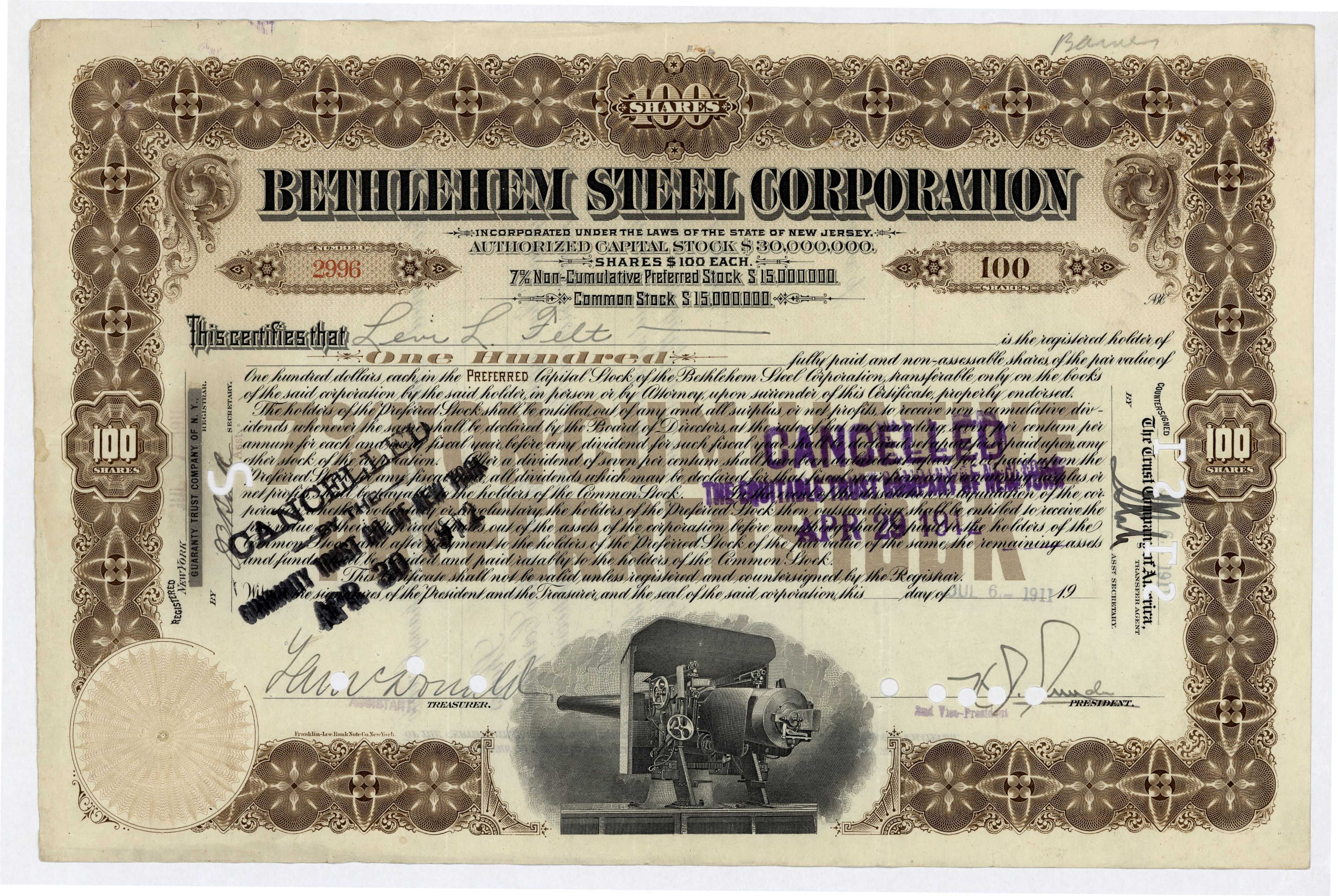
A preferred share of Bethlehem Steel Corporation stock, issued July 6, 1911

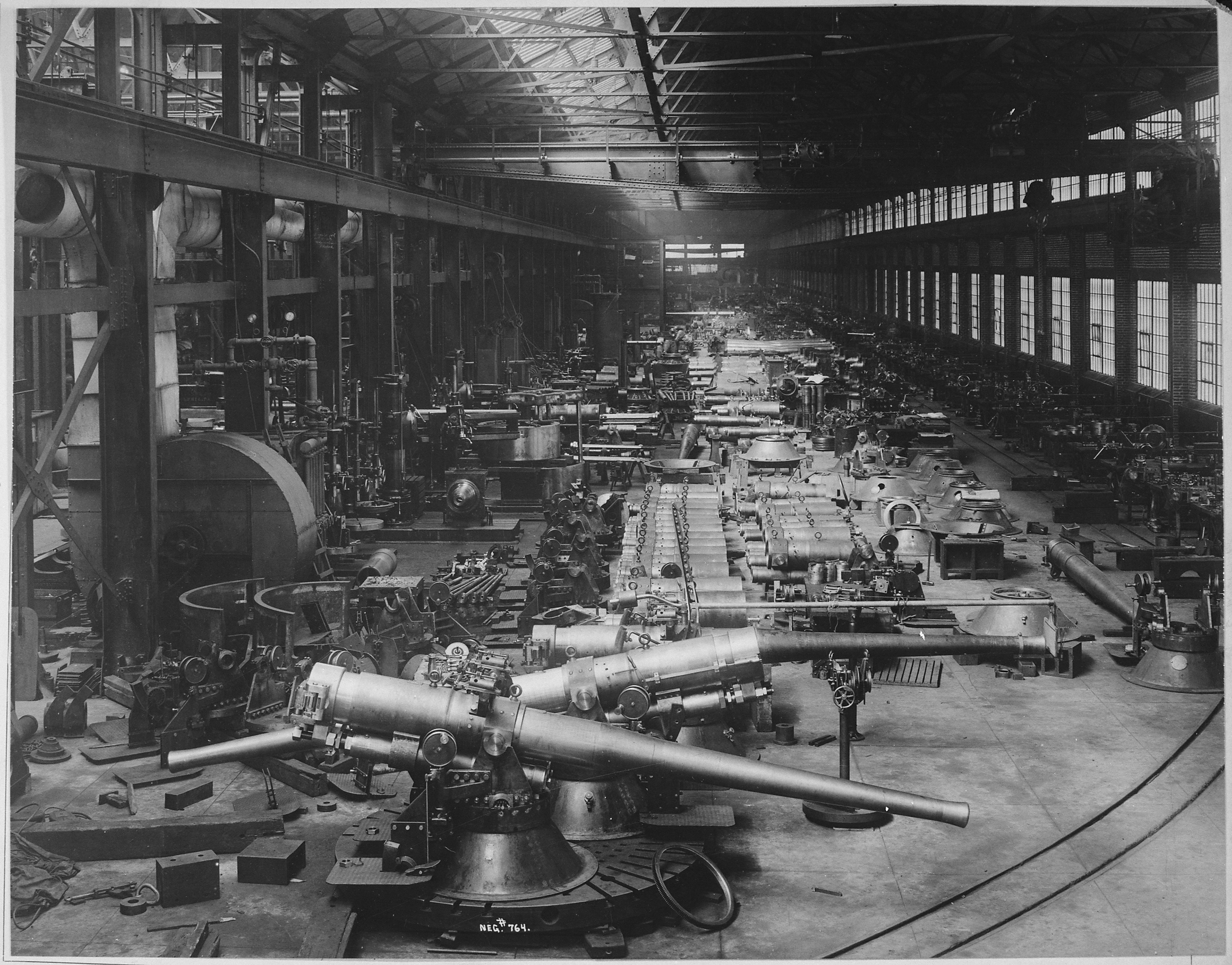
Naval artillery being assembled at Bethlehem Steel, c. 1918

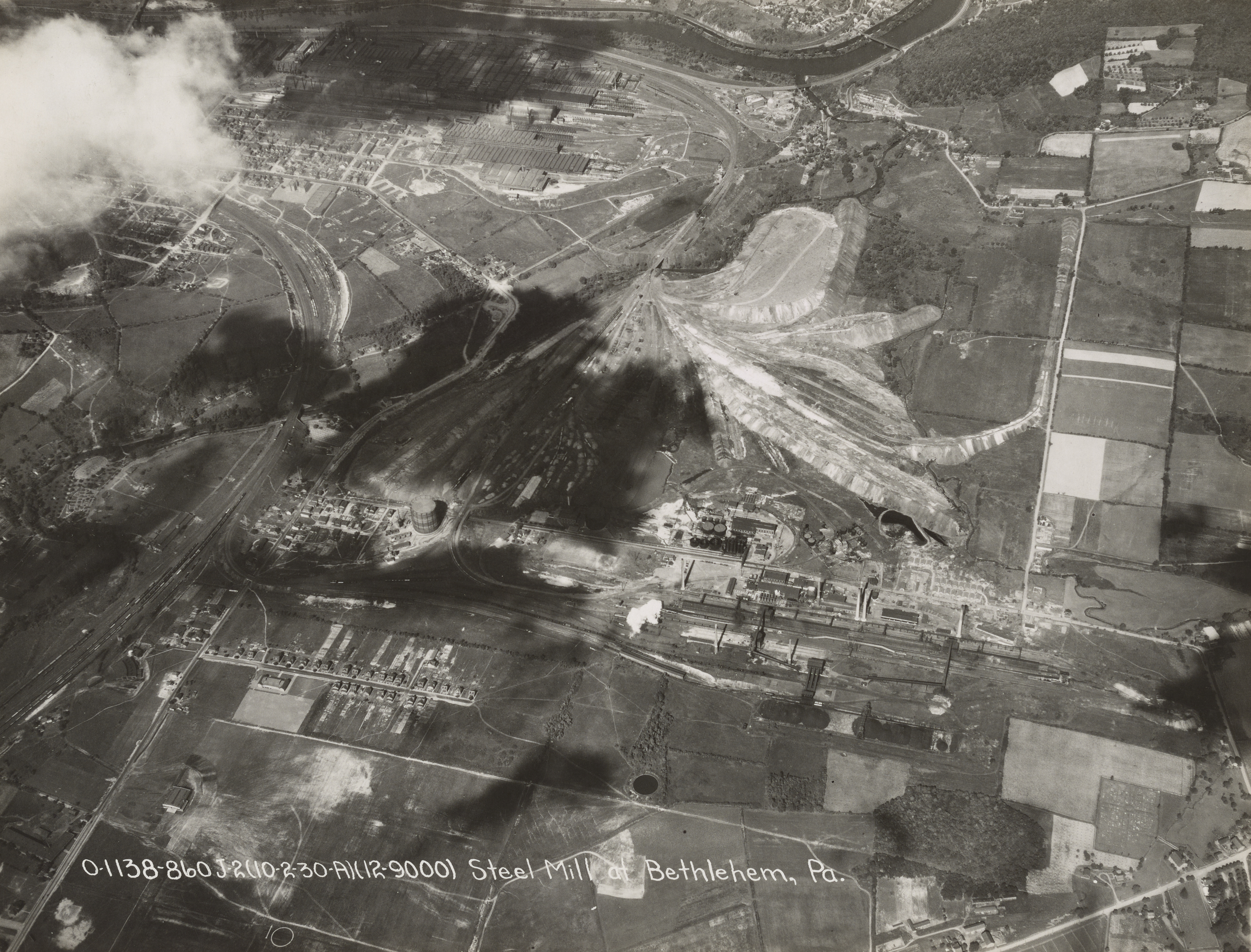
The Bethlehem Steel mill in 1930

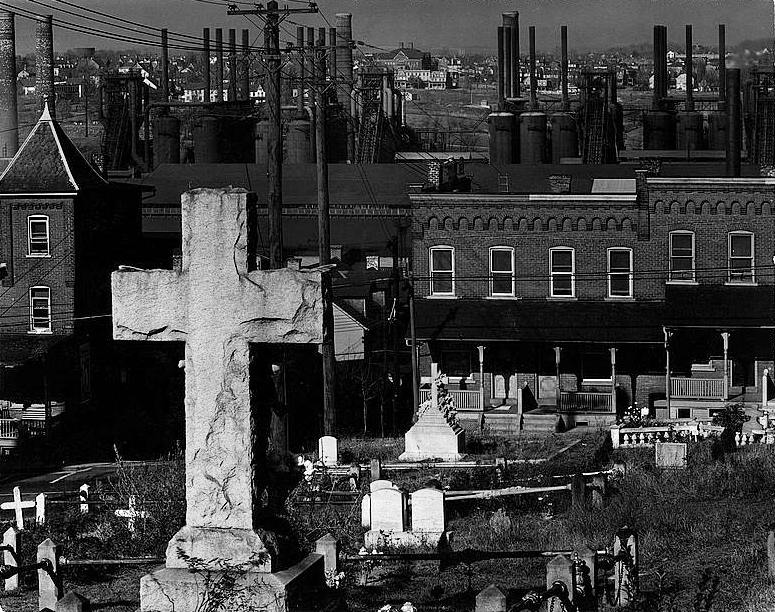
Bethlehem Graveyard and Steel Mill, a famed Great Depression-era photo of St. Michael's Cemetery in Bethlehem (foreground) and the smokestacks of Bethlehem Steel (background) in 1935 by Walker Evans

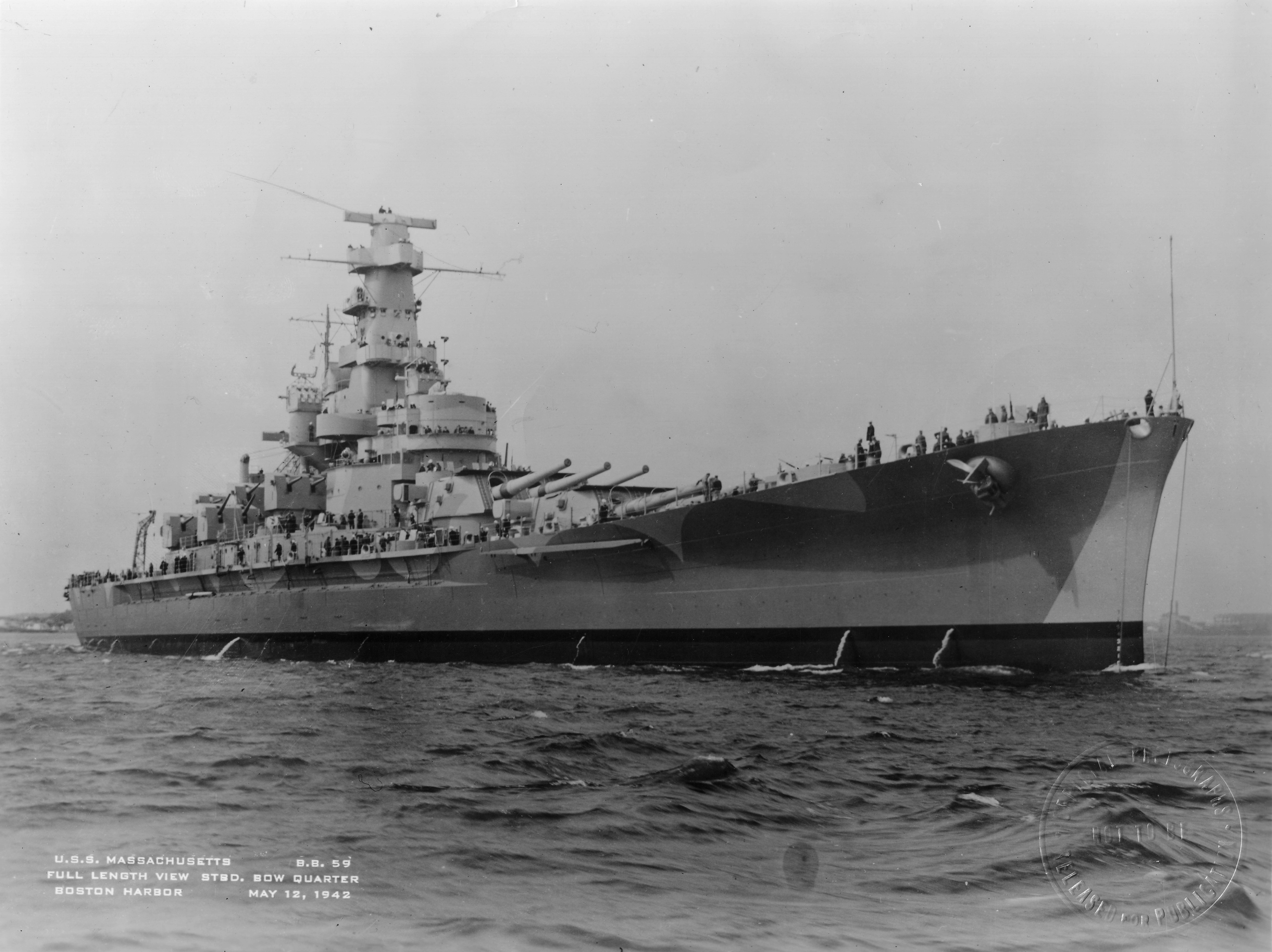
A 1942 photo of USS Massachusetts, built at Bethlehem Steel's Fore River Shipyard in Quincy, Massachusetts during World War II

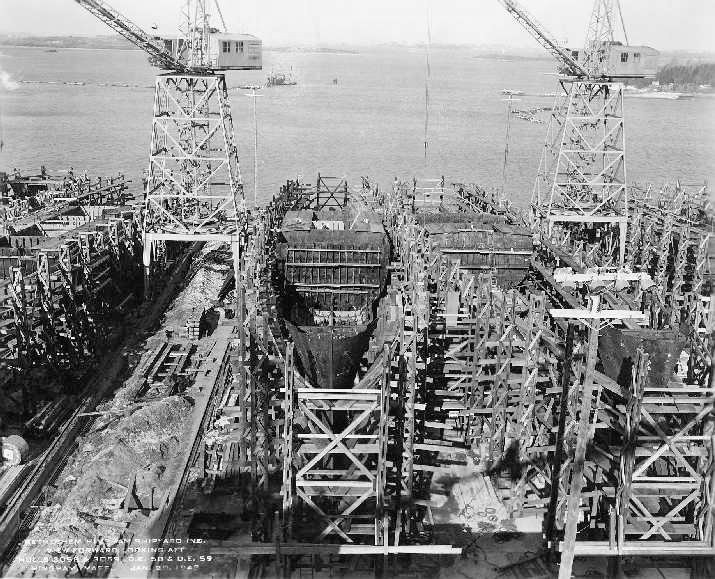
Bethlehem Steel constructing two World War II warships, HMS Calder (left) and USS Foss (right) in 1943 during World War II

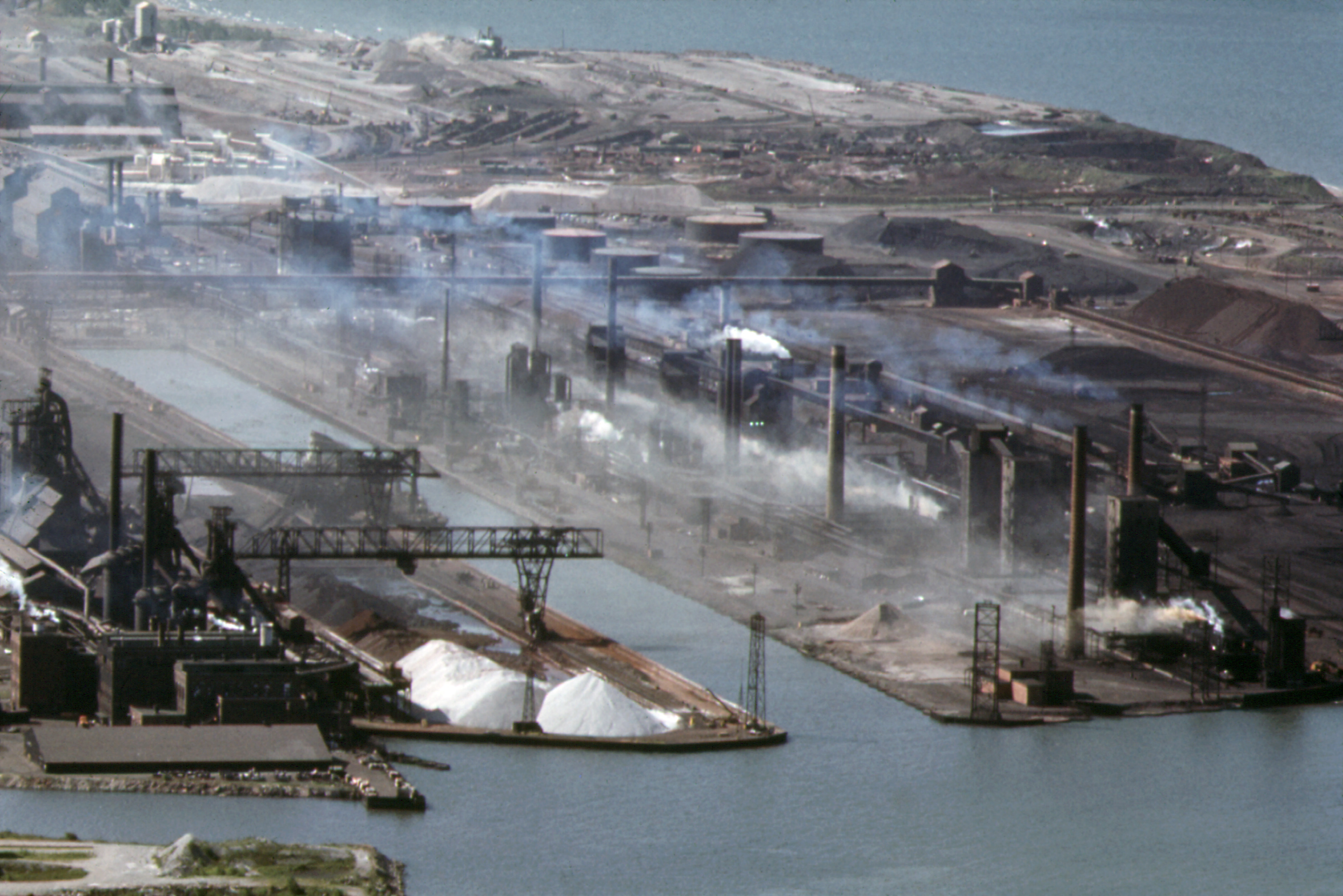
A Bethlehem Steel plant at Lake Erie in Buffalo, New York, in 1973

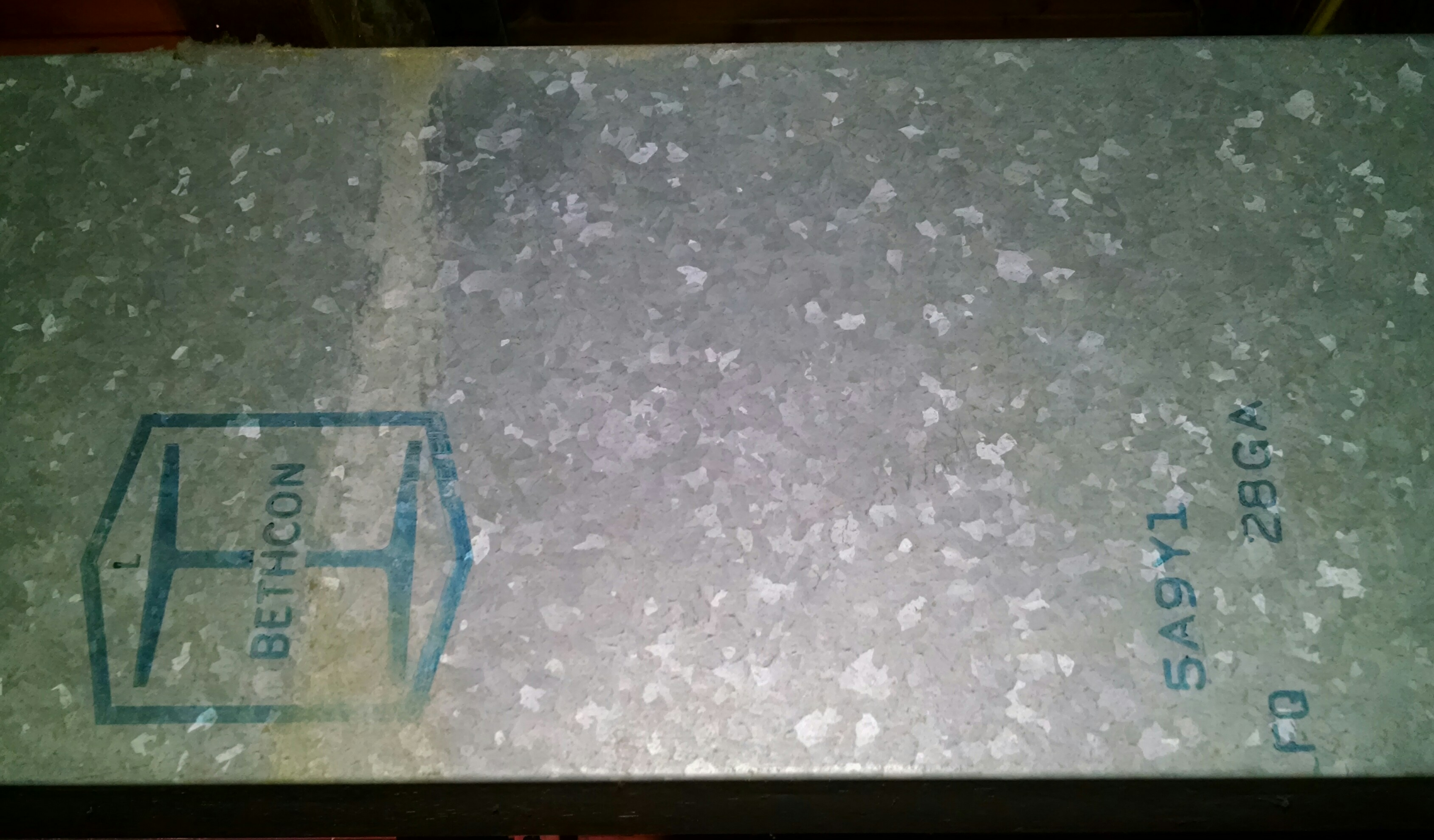
The BETHCON trademark, which was used on Bethlehem Steel's HVAC ducting

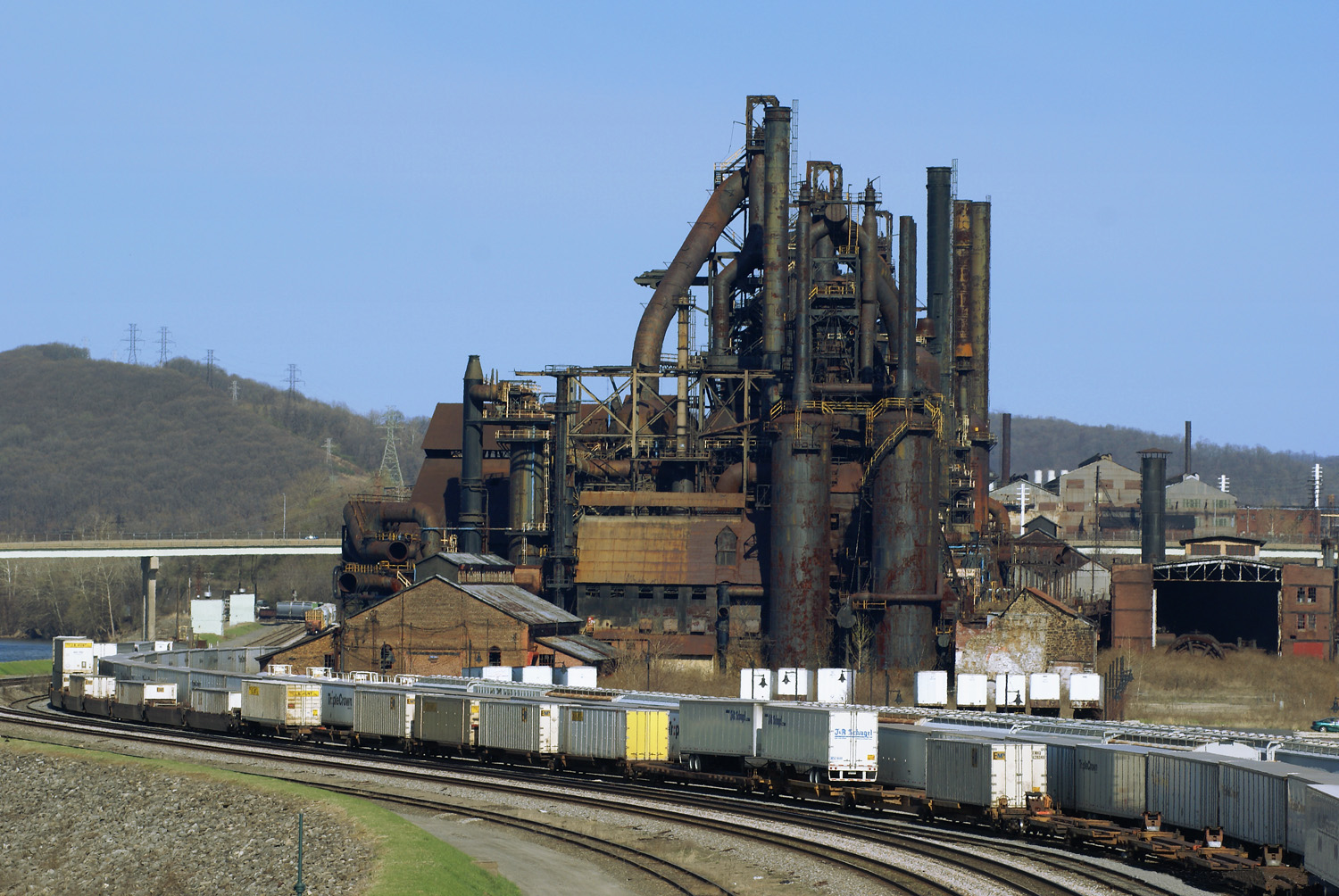
Bethlehem Steel was one of the world's leading steel manufacturers for most of the 20th century. In 1982, it discontinued most of its operations, declared bankruptcy in 2001, and was dissolved in 2003.

In 1901, Charles M. Schwab (no relation to the stockbroker Charles R. Schwab), purchased Bethlehem Steel Company, and named Samuel Broadbent as its vice president. During this time, the company's lease with the Bethlehem Iron Company came to an end as the Bethlehem Steel Company gained control of all properties from the Bethlehem Iron Company and Bethlehem Iron Company ceased operations.

Schwab transferred his ownership of Bethlehem Steel Company to U.S. Steel Corporation, the company where he previously served as president. Schwab then repurchased Bethlehem Steel Company, and sold it to United States Shipbuilding Company, which owned Bethlehem Steel Company only briefly. The United States Shipbuilding Company was in turmoil; its subsidiaries, including Bethlehem Steel Company, contributed to United States Shipbuilding Company's problems. Schwab again became involved with Bethlehem Steel Company through the parent company, United States Shipbuilding Company.

In 1903, United States Shipbuilding Company planned to reorganize as Bethlehem Steel and Shipbuilding Company, which was the second company to use the name Bethlehem Steel. However, United States Shipbuilding Company was not reorganized as Bethlehem Steel and Shipbuilding Company; instead, a plan was drawn up for a new company to be formed to replace United States Shipbuilding Company. The new company was initially to be named Bethlehem Steel and Shipbuilding Company. In 1904, it instead assumed the name Bethlehem Steel Corporation. From 1906 until it was delisted in 2002, Bethlehem Steel was traded on the New York Stock Exchange under the symbol BS.

Bethlehem Steel Corporation was formed by Schwab, who had recently resigned from U.S. Steel, and by Joseph Wharton, who founded Wharton School at the University of Pennsylvania in Philadelphia. Schwab became the company's first president and first chairman of its board of directors.

After its formation, Bethlehem Steel Corporation purchased Bethlehem Steel Company and its remaining subsidiaries from United States Shipbuilding Company. Bethlehem Steel Company became a subsidiary of Bethlehem Steel Corporation, though the Bethlehem Steel Company also had subsidiaries of its own. Bethlehem Steel Corporation became the second-largest steel provider in the nation. Both Bethlehem Steel Company and Bethlehem Steel Corporation existed simultaneously after 1904 until the 1960s, when the two companies merged into Bethlehem Steel Corporation.

In January, 1908, Bethlehem Steel Corporation began producing America's first commercially successful wide-flange structural shapes, which proved partly responsible for ushering in the age of the skyscraper and establishing Bethlehem Steel as the leading supplier of steel to the construction industry. The beams were made according to the designs of Henry Grey, who patented the process in 1897. The decision by Bethlehem to pursue the Grey Mill was announced in December 1905. Schwab had earlier tried, and failed, to convince U.S. Steel to produce the beams.

The first major project built using the new Bethlehem Grey beams was Gimbel's department store in New York City. It was built using 12,000 tons of Grey beams.

In the early 1900s, Samuel Broadbent led an initiative to diversify the company. The corporation diversified beyond steel, managing iron mines in Cuba and shipyards around the U.S. In 1913, under Broadbent, Bethlehem Steel acquired Fore River Shipbuilding Company, a Quincy, Massachusetts-based company, and became one of the world's major shipbuilders. In 1917, it incorporated its shipbuilding division as Bethlehem Shipbuilding Corporation Ltd. In 1922, Bethlehem Steel purchased the Lackawanna Steel Company, which included Delaware, Lackawanna and Western Railroad and extensive coal holdings.

During World War I and World War II, Bethlehem Steel was a major supplier of armor plate and ordinance to the U.S. armed forces, including armor plate and large-caliber guns used by the U.S. Navy, which proved influential to U.S. victories in both wars. Bethlehem Steel "was the most important to America's national defense of any company in the past century. We wouldn't have won World War I and World War II without it", historian Lance Metz told The Washington Post in 2003.

In the 1930s, the company manufactured the steel sections and the parts of the Golden Gate Bridge and built for Yacimientos Petrolíferos Fiscales, a new oil refinery in La Plata, Argentina, which was the tenth-largest in the world. During World War II, as much as 70 percent of airplane cylinder forgings, a quarter of the armor plate for warships, and a third of the big cannon forgings for the U.S armed forces were manufactured by Bethlehem Steel.

Steel is an alloy made up of iron and carbon, and additional minerals are sometimes added to it depending on its intended use. In the 20th century, however, sourcing necessary minerals in the U.S. began proving significantly more expensive than obtaining from other nations. Bethlehem Steel is one of several U.S. companies that chose to source iron from Latin America. The company established a presence in Latin America for roughly a century from the 1880s to 1980s. The company profited greatly from U.S. economic control over the region. "In a single year, 1960, U.S. Steel and Bethlehem Steel realized a greater than 30 percent profit on their Venezuelan iron investment, and this profit equaled all the taxes paid to the Venezuelan state in the decade since 1950"

Bethlehem Steel also relied on Latin American mines for manganese, an additive for tensile strength. During President Eurico Dutra's presidency in Brazil from 1946 to 1951, Bethlehem Steel received 40 million ton of manganese “for 4 percent of the income of exporting it.”

==== World War II ====
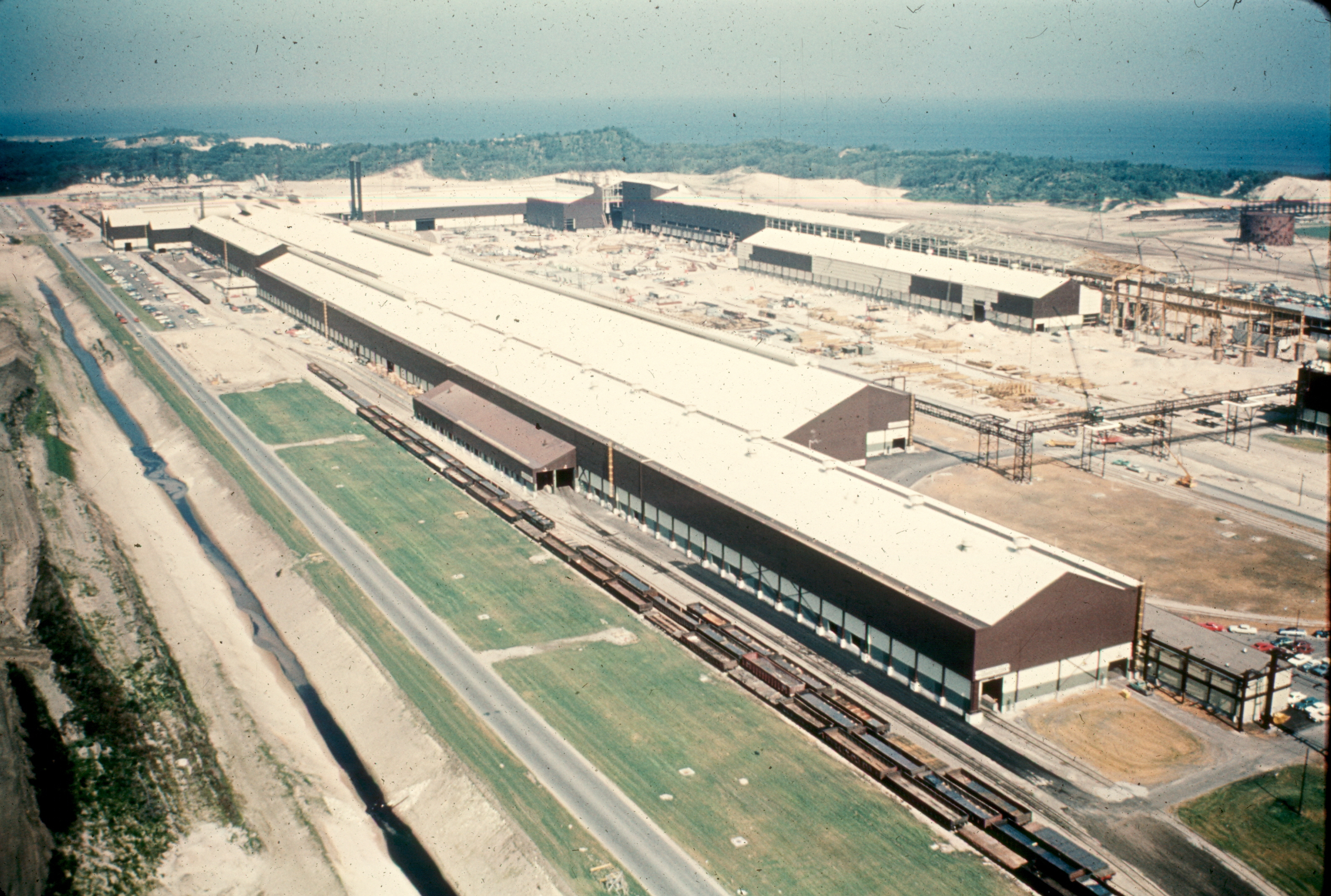
An aerial view of the world's first 160-inch Plate Mill at Bethlehem Steel's Burns Harbor plant in Burns Harbor, Indiana, c. 1964. Other sections of the plant under construction are visible in the back right of the image, and the high sand dunes and Lake Michigan can be seen in the background.

Bethlehem Steel ranked seventh among all U.S. corporations in the value of its wartime production contracts during World War II. Bethlehem Shipbuilding Corporation's 15 shipyards produced a total of 1,121 ships, more than any other builder during World War II, and nearly one-fifth of the U.S. Navy's two-ocean fleet. Its shipbuilding operations employed as many as 180,000 persons, representing the lion's share of the company's total employment of 300,000 at the time.

From 1916 to 1945, Eugene Grace served as president of Bethlehem Steel, and chairman of the board from 1945 until his retirement in 1957. Grace orchestrated Bethlehem Steel's World War II wartime efforts. In 1943, Grace promised U.S. President Franklin D. Roosevelt that Bethlehem Steel would manufacture one ship per day, and he ultimately exceeded that commitment by 15 ships.

World War II, however, drained Bethlehem Steel of much of its male workforce. With many of its male employees deployed to the war front, the company hired female employees to guard and work on the company's factory floor and in its company offices. After World War II, female workers were promptly fired in favor of male counterparts.

On Liberty Fleet Day, September 27, 1941, then U.S. President Franklin D. Roosevelt was present at the launching of the first Liberty ship SS Patrick Henry at Bethlehem Steel's Bethlehem Fairfield Shipyard in Baltimore. Also launched the same day were the Liberty SS James McKay at Bethlehem Sparrows Point Shipyard in Sparrows Point, Maryland, and the emergency vessel SS Sinclair Superflame at the Fore River Shipyard in Quincy, Massachusetts.

=== Late 20th century ===
In 1946, Bethlehem Steel signed a contract with mining company LKAB, committing the company to contribute to the post-World War II recovery of the iron ore industry in Norrbotten County in northern Sweden. Following the end of World War II, Bethlehem Steel's plant continued to supply a wide variety of structural shapes for construction trades. Galvanized sheet steel under the name BETHCON was widely produced for use as duct work or spiral conduit. The company also produced forged products for defense, power generation, and steel-producing companies.

From 1949 to 1952, Bethlehem Steel had a contract with the U.S. federal government to roll uranium fuel rods for nuclear reactors in Bethlehem Steel's Lackawanna, New York plant. Workers were not aware of the dangers of the hazardous substance and were not given protective equipment. Some workers later sought compensation under a radiation exposure law, which was enacted in 2000 and required the U.S. Labor Department to compensate workers up to $150,000 if they developed cancer later in life, provided their work history involved enough radiation exposure to significantly increase their cancer risk. Bethlehem Steel workers, however, have not been awarded this compensation because radiation doses involved in processing fresh uranium fuel is low and produces a small risk relative to baseline risks. The larger danger in processing uranium is chemical poisoning from the heavy metal, which does not produce cancer.

The steel industry in the U.S. prospered during and after World War II, while the steel industries in Germany and Japan were in ruins, devastated by allied bombardments. Bethlehem Steel's success reached its peak in the late 1950s and early 1960s. The company began manufacturing 23 million tons of steel annually. In 1958, the company's president, Arthur B. Homer, was the nation's highest-paid business executive, and the firm built the first phase of what became its largest plant, Burns Harbor, between 1962 and 1964 in Burns Harbor, Indiana.

In 1967, the company lost its bid to provide steel for the original World Trade Center. The contracts, a single one of which was for 50,000 tons of steel, went to competitors in Seattle, St. Louis, New York, and Illinois.

U.S. global leadership in steel manufacturing lasted about two decades, during which U.S. steel industry operated with little foreign competition. Eventually, however, foreign firms were rebuilt with modern techniques, including continuous casting, while profitable U.S. companies resisted modernization. Bethlehem Steel experimented with continuous casting but never fully adopted the practice.

As the age of Bethlehem Steel workers was increasing, however, the ratio of retirees to workers was rising, meaning that the value created by each worker had to cover a greater portion of pension costs than before. Former top manager Eugene Grace failed to adequately invest in the company's pension plans during the 1950s. At its peak, the company's pension contributions that should have been made were not. As a result, the company encountered difficulty when it faced rising pension costs associated with its retiring workers, which were amplified by the company's diminishing profits and increased global competition.

By the 1970s, imported foreign steel was proving cheaper than domestically produced steel, and Bethlehem Steel faced growing competition from mini-mills and smaller-scale operations that could sell steel at lower prices. Flooding from 1972 Hurricane Agnes resulted in the closure of the Cornwall iron mine in 1973. Grace Mine, a Bethlehem owned underground iron mine in Berks County, PA, shut down in 1977.

In 1982, Bethlehem Steel reported an unexpected loss of US$1.5 billion, and responded by promptly shutting down much of its operations. The company returned to profitability briefly six years later, in 1988, but restructuring and shutdowns continued through the 1990s. In the mid-1980s, demand for the plant's structural products began diminishing, and new competition entered the marketplace following the 1987 formation of Nucor-Yamato. The firm would build a plant in Blythville, Arkansas. Lighter construction styles, featuring lower-height construction styles, such as low-rise buildings, did not require the heavy structural grades of steel that were being produced at the Bethlehem plant.

In 1991, Bethlehem Steel Corporation discontinued coal mining, which the company had been conducting under the name BethEnergy. In 1992, the Johnstown plants of the Bethlehem Steel, which were founded in 1852 by the Cambria Iron Company of Johnstown and were purchased by Bethlehem Steel in 1923, were forced into closure. In 1993, the company also exited the railroad car business.

By the end of 1995, Bethlehem Steel ceased manufacturing steel at its main Bethlehem plant, bringing an end to 140 years of such production in Bethlehem, and the company ceased operations in Bethlehem. Two years later, in 1997, Bethlehem Steel Corporation ceased shipbuilding activities in an attempt to preserve its steel manufacturing operations.

In 1998, after denying pension benefits, a lawsuit was filed in the Third Circuit Court of Appeals in Philadelphia. The case, Lawrence Hollyfield, Fiduciary to the Estate of Collins Hollyfield v. Pension Plan of Bethlehem Steel Corporation and Subsidiary Companies, was settled in favor of Hollyfield three years later, in 2001. The settlement led to a class action lawsuit filed by Bethlehem Steel's workers union, which led to PBGC assuming all Bethlehem Steel pension obligations, representing the largest pension such liability assumption in U.S. history.

=== 21st century operations, bankruptcy, and liquidation ===
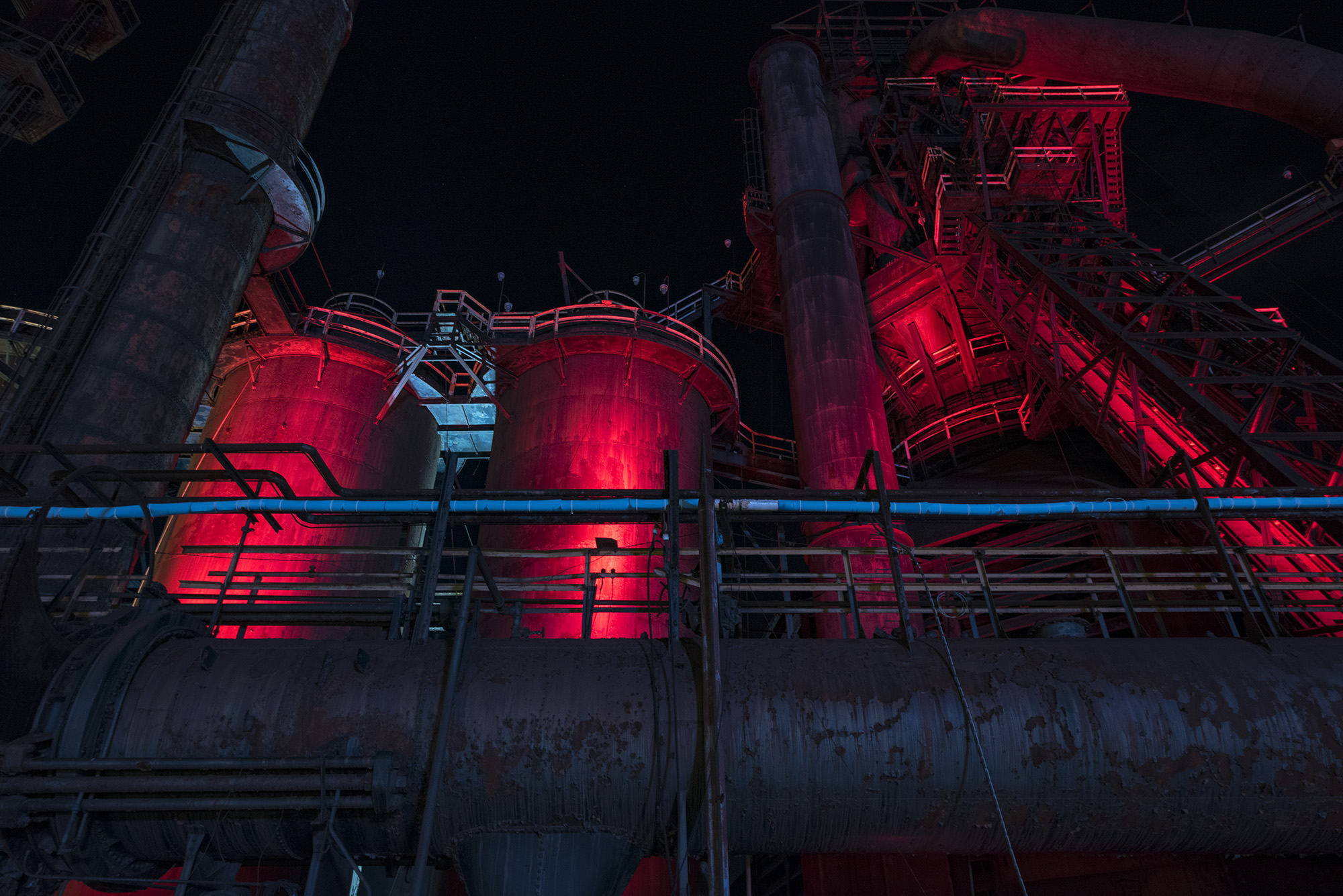
The still preserved but now dormant steel stacks of Bethlehem Steel at the company's manufacturing headquarters in Bethlehem. In 2007, much of the former headquarters was acquired by Sands Bethworks, a casino later sold and renamed Wind Creek Bethlehem.

In 2001, Bethlehem Steel filed for bankruptcy, becoming the 25th American steelmaking company in the span of four years between 1998 and 2001 to file for bankruptcy protection. In 2003, the company was dissolved and liquidated with its remaining assets, including six plants, acquired by the International Steel Group. International Steel Group, in turn, was acquired by Mittal Steel in 2005, which then merged with Arcelor to become ArcelorMittal in 2006.

Despite closing its local operations, Bethlehem Steel tried to reduce the significant economic and social impact on Bethlehem and the Lehigh Valley area, announcing plans to revitalize the south side of Bethlehem where its headquarters and primary plant had existed since the mid-19th century. The company hired consultants to develop conceptual plans on the reuse of the massive property, and a consensus emerged to rename the 163 acres (66 ha) site Bethlehem Works and to use the land for cultural, recreational, educational, entertainment, and retail development. The National Museum of Industrial History, in association with the Smithsonian Institution and the Bethlehem Commerce Center, consisting of 1,600 acres (650 ha) of prime industrial property in Bethlehem would be erected on the site along with a casino and a large retail and entertainment complex.

In 2007, the Bethlehem Steel property was sold to Sands BethWorks, which planned to build a casino where the plant once stood. Construction began in fall 2007, and the casino was completed in 2009. Due to a global steel shortage at the time, the casino had difficulty finding the 16,000 tons of structural steel needed for construction of the $600 million casino complex.

The site of the company's original plant in Bethlehem, Pennsylvania is home to SteelStacks, an arts and entertainment district. The plant's rusted five blast furnaces were left standing and serve as a backdrop for the new campus. SteelStacks currently features the ArtsQuest Center, a contemporary performing arts center, the Wind Creek Bethlehem casino resort, formerly Sands Casino Resort Bethlehem, a gambling emporium, and new studios for WLVT-TV, the Lehigh Valley's PBS affiliate. The area includes three outdoor music venues: Levitt Pavilion is a free music venue featuring lawn seating for up to 2,500 people, Air Products Town Square at Steelstacks, and PNC Plaza, which hosts outdoor concerts. Levitt Pavilion and the casino resort are connected via the Hoover-Mason Trestle linear park.

At the former Cambria Iron Company plant in Johnstown, Pennsylvania, the blacksmith shop, carpentry and pattern shop, and rolling mill administration buildings are now part of the Center for Metal Arts.

On November 9, 2016, a warehouse being used as a recycling facility that was part of the Bethlehem Steel complex in Lackawanna, New York caught fire and burned down.

On May 19, 2019, Martin Tower, Bethlehem Steel's former corporate headquarters building in West Bethlehem, was demolished.

Bethlehem Steel's corporate records are housed at the Hagley Museum and Library in Wilmington, Delaware, the National Canal Museum in Easton, PA, and the National Museum of Industrial History in Bethlehem, PA.

== Shipyards ==
Bethlehem Shipbuilding Corporation was created in 1905, when Bethlehem Steel acquired the San Francisco-based shipyard Union Iron Works. In 1917, it was incorporated as 'Bethlehem Shipbuilding Corporation, Limited.

== Electric multiple units ==
In 1931 and 1932, Bethlehem Steel manufactured 38 electric multiple unit carriages for the Philadelphia-based Reading Company, then one of the nation's largest and most profitable commercial railroads.

== Freight cars ==
From 1923 to 1991, Bethlehem Steel was one of the world's leading producers of railroad freight cars following their purchase of Midvale Steel, whose railcar division was located in Johnstown, Pennsylvania. Bethlehem Steel Freight Car Division pioneered the use of aluminum in freight car construction. The Johnstown plant was purchased from Bethlehem Steel through a management buyout in 1991, creating Johnstown America Industries.

== Influence on American landmarks ==
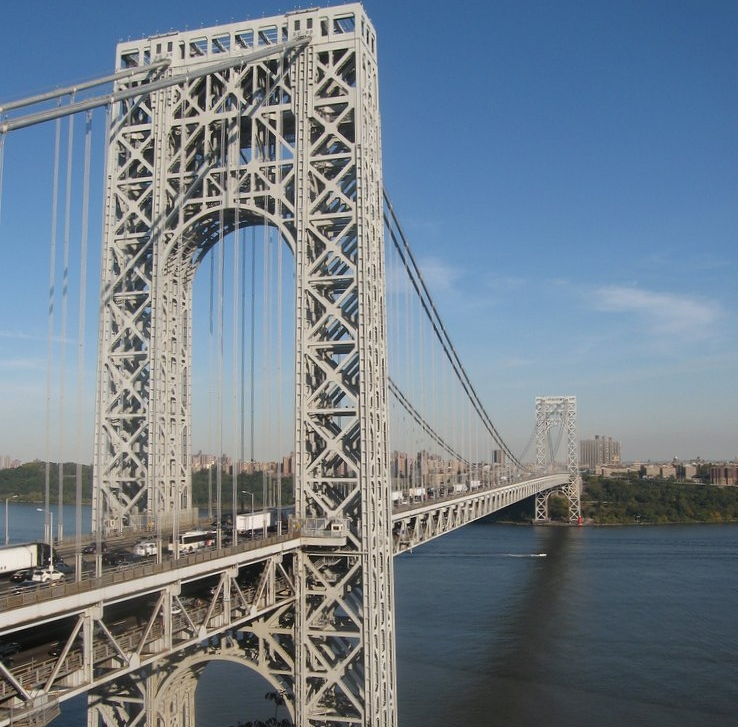
Bethlehem Steel manufactured the steel used in the 1927 construction of George Washington Bridge, the world's busiest motor vehicle bridge, which connects Manhattan and New York City with New Jersey.

Bethlehem Steel manufactured steel used in many of the nation's most prominent landmarks, including:

=== Bridges ===
- George Washington Bridge
- Golden Gate Bridge
- Ben Franklin Bridge
- Commodore Barry Bridge
- Peace Bridge
- Verrazzano–Narrows Bridge's Staten Island tower

=== Buildings ===
- Alcatraz Island
- Empire State Building
- Madison Square Garden
- Merchandise Mart
- One Chase Manhattan Plaza's 53,000-ton steel frame
- Rockefeller Center
- Waldorf Astoria hotel
- The John F. Kennedy Center for the Performing Arts

=== Dams ===
- Bonneville Dam
- Grand Coulee Dam
- Hoover Dam

=== Railways ===
- San Francisco Municipal Railway

Bethlehem Steel fabricated the largest electric generator shaft in the world, produced for General Electric in the 1950s, and the steel used for the Wonder Wheel in Coney Island.

== In popular culture ==
=== Music ===
- In 2012, Bethlehem Steel, a three-piece indie rock band, named itself after the company to honor its legacy.
- Also in 2012, the song "Bethlehem Steel" by Nanci Griffith, one of the tracks on her album Intersection, mourned the company's closure.
- In 2026, Brian J. MacShain released the song "The Steel" on his album Pennamite that tells the story of Bethlehem Steel's closure through the eyes of one of its workers.
- In 1982, Billy Joel released "Allentown", a song depicting the lives of steelworkers in the twin cities of Allentown and Bethlehem, Pennsylvania. "The subject of the song is the demise of the manufacturing industry in the United States. With the closing of Bethlehem Steel a generation of people were left jobless and depressed, wanting to leave but still clinging to the glory their parents were able to achieve."
- In 1996, Grant Lee Buffalo released the song "Bethlehem Steel”, off the album Copperopolis (album). It referenced the eponymous steel company in its lyrics.

=== Sports ===
- Bethlehem Steel F.C. (1907–1930), sponsored by the Bethlehem Steel corporation, was one of the most successful early American soccer clubs.
- Philadelphia Union II is an American professional soccer team that is the official affiliate of the Philadelphia Union of Major League Soccer. The club was founded and formerly based in Bethlehem, where it was known as Bethlehem Steel FC in honor of the original club.
- In February 2013, the Philadelphia Union of Major League Soccer unveiled a third uniform that honors and harks back to the original Bethlehem Steel F.C. The kit is primarily black with white trim and features a sublimated Union emblem and a Bethlehem Steel FC jock tag.

=== Drink ===
- Jennings Cox, a Bethlehem engineer, devised the Daiquiri while working at an iron mine of the same name in Cuba.

== Gallery ==
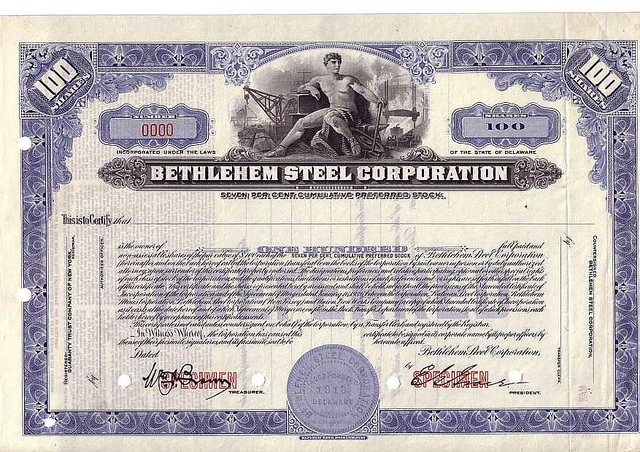
1936 specimen stock certificate #0000

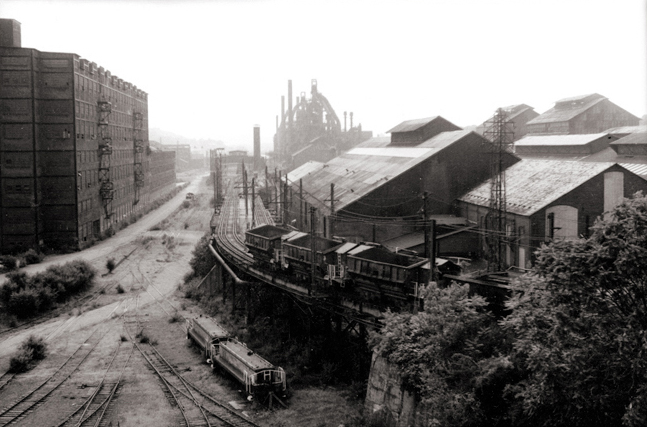
Bethlehem Steel Corporation's flagship manufacturing facility in Bethlehem, Pennsylvania

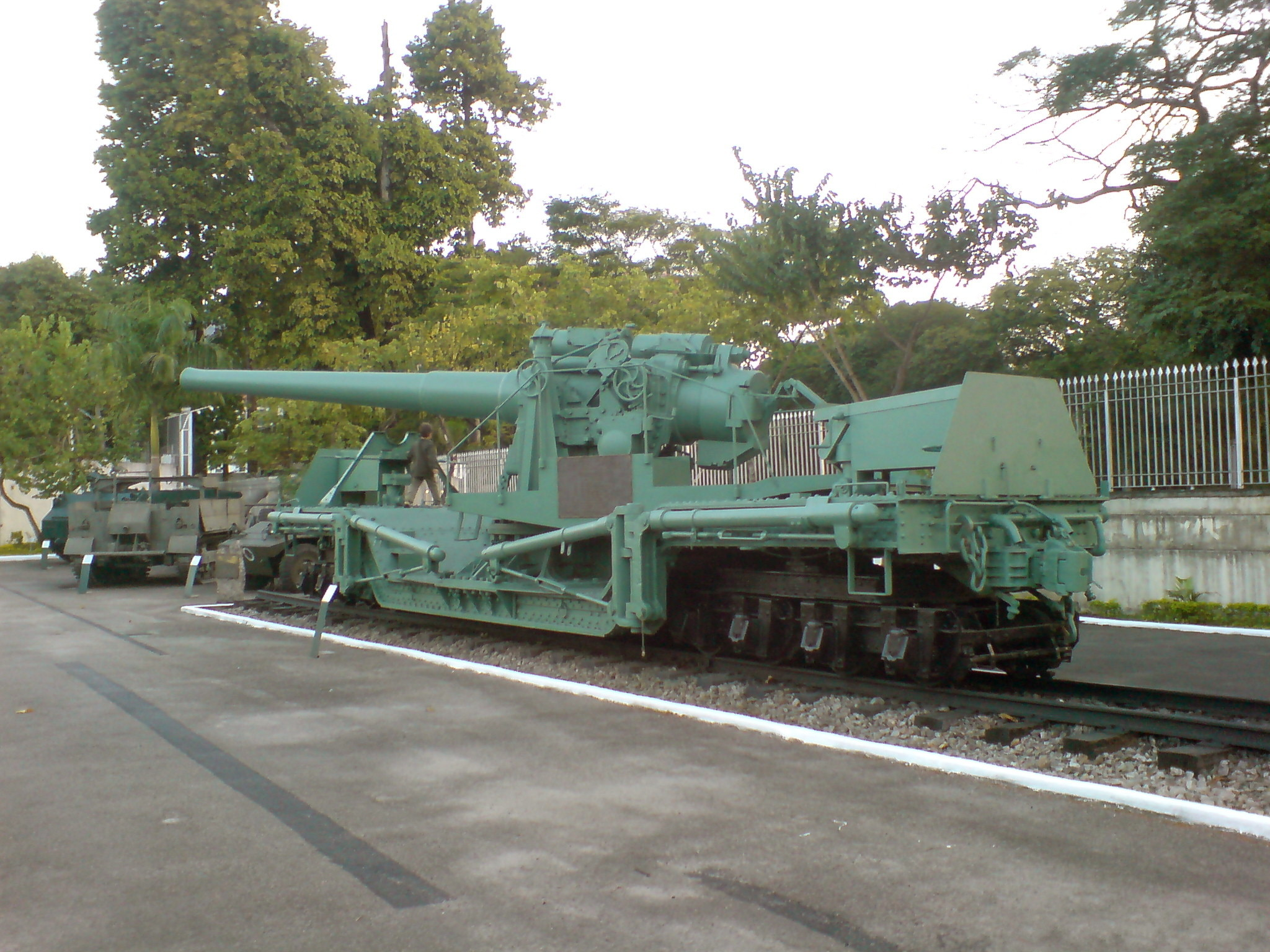
"Bethlehem 177" railway gun on display at Museu Militar Conde de Linhares, Rio de Janeiro, Brazil

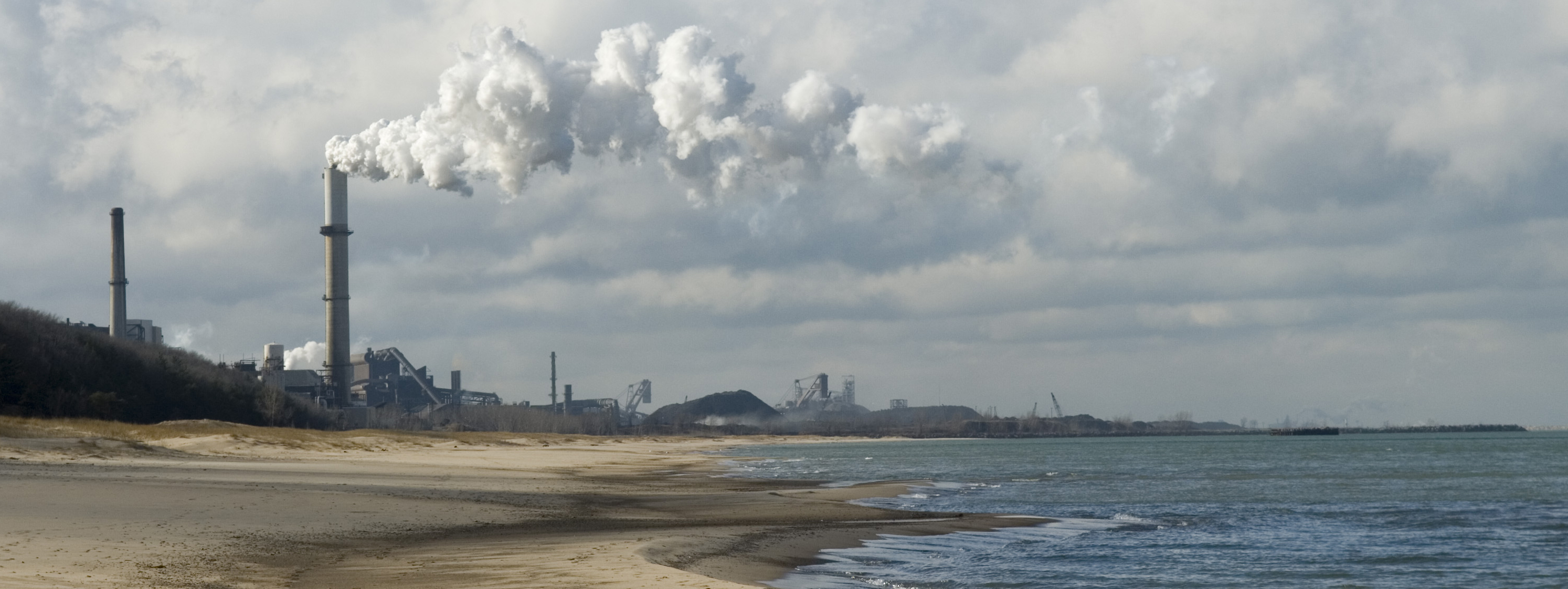
The Burns Harbor, Indiana, plant built by Bethlehem Steel

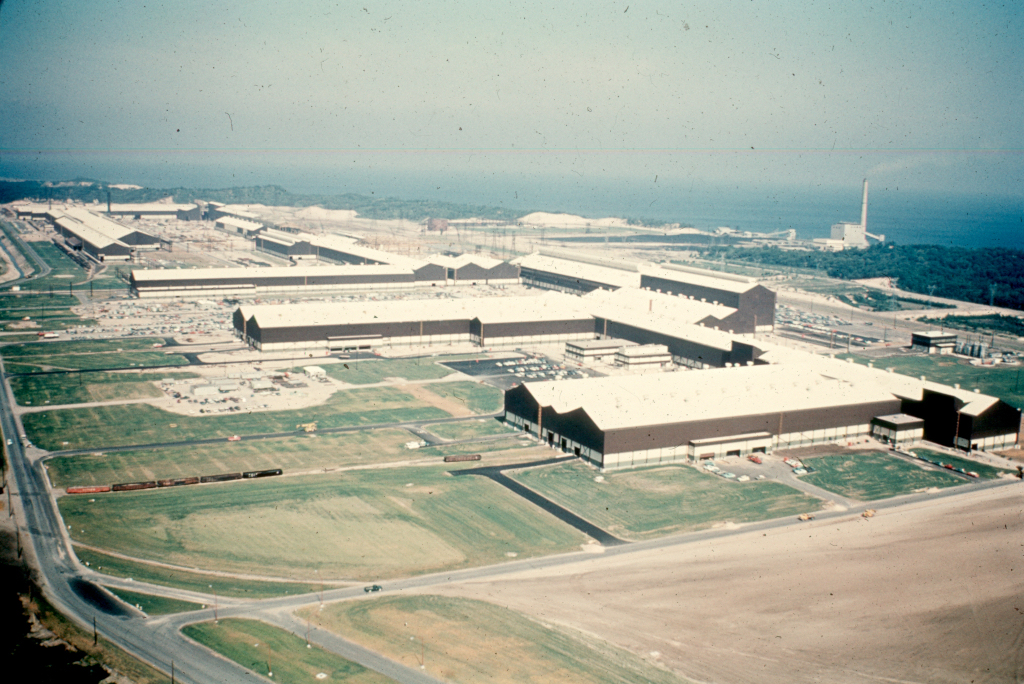
Aerial view of the mill area of the Burns Harbor plant circa 1964. The 160" plate mill is in the upper left.

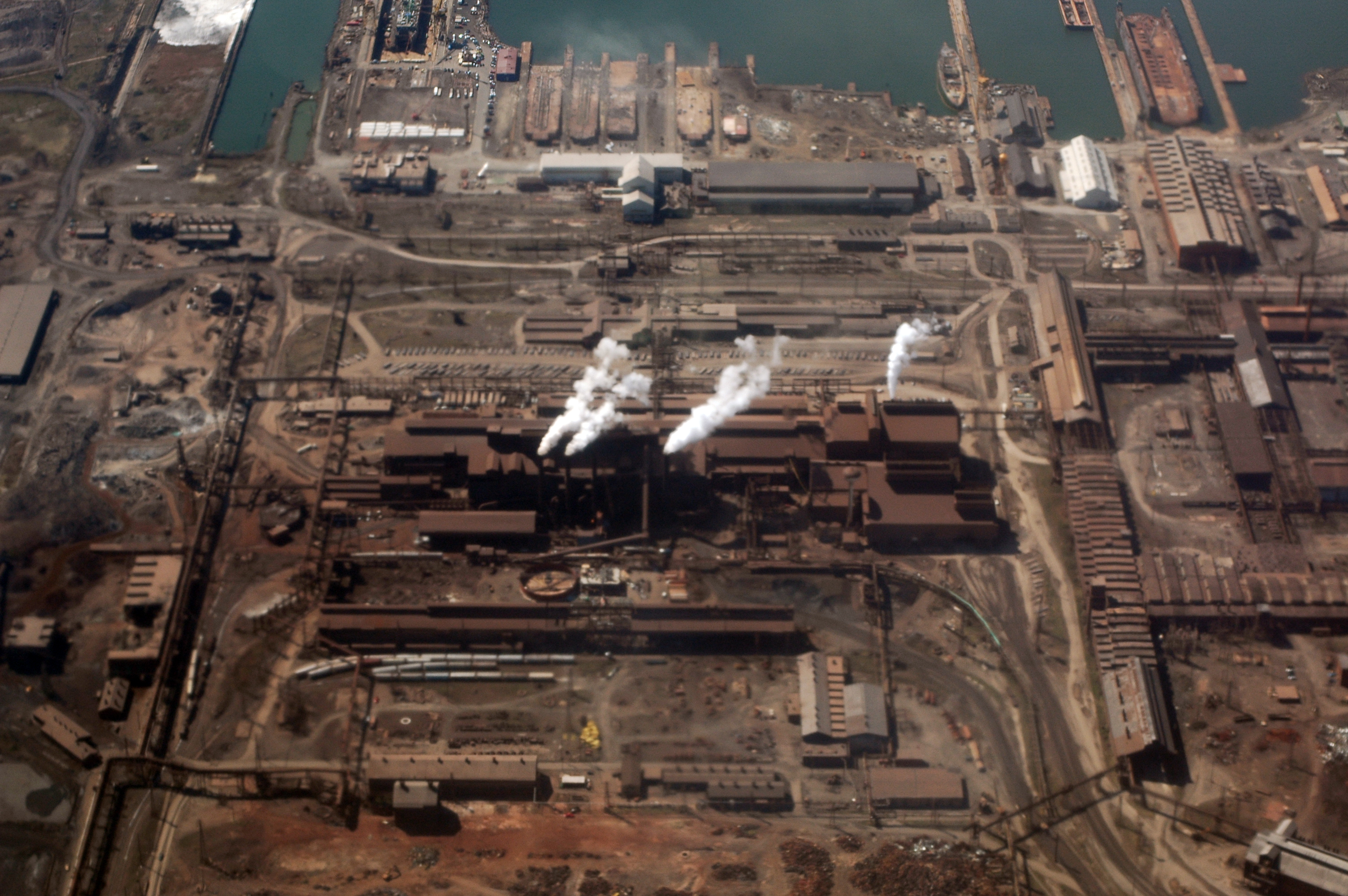
The Bethlehem Sparrows Point Shipyard at Sparrows Point, Maryland, one of the company's primary steel making and shipbuilding plants

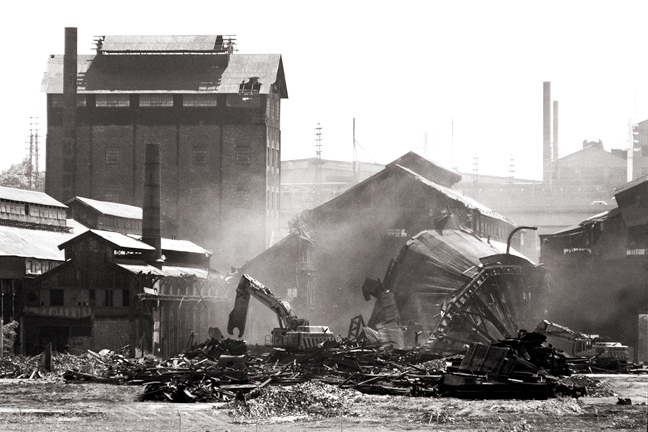
Demolition of part of the original facility in Bethlehem in 2007

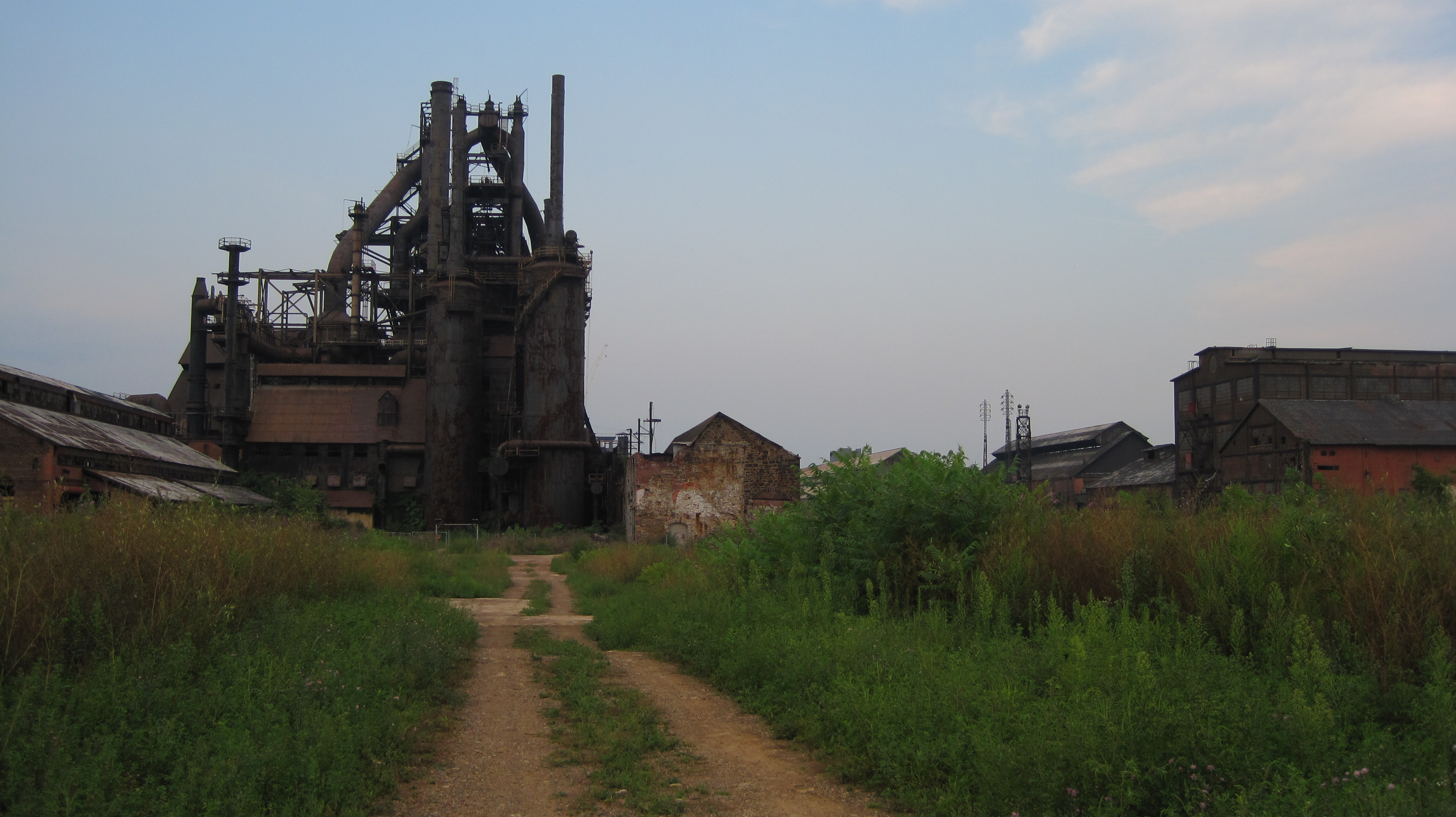
Blast furnace A at the flagship plant in Bethlehem, Pennsylvania, 2009

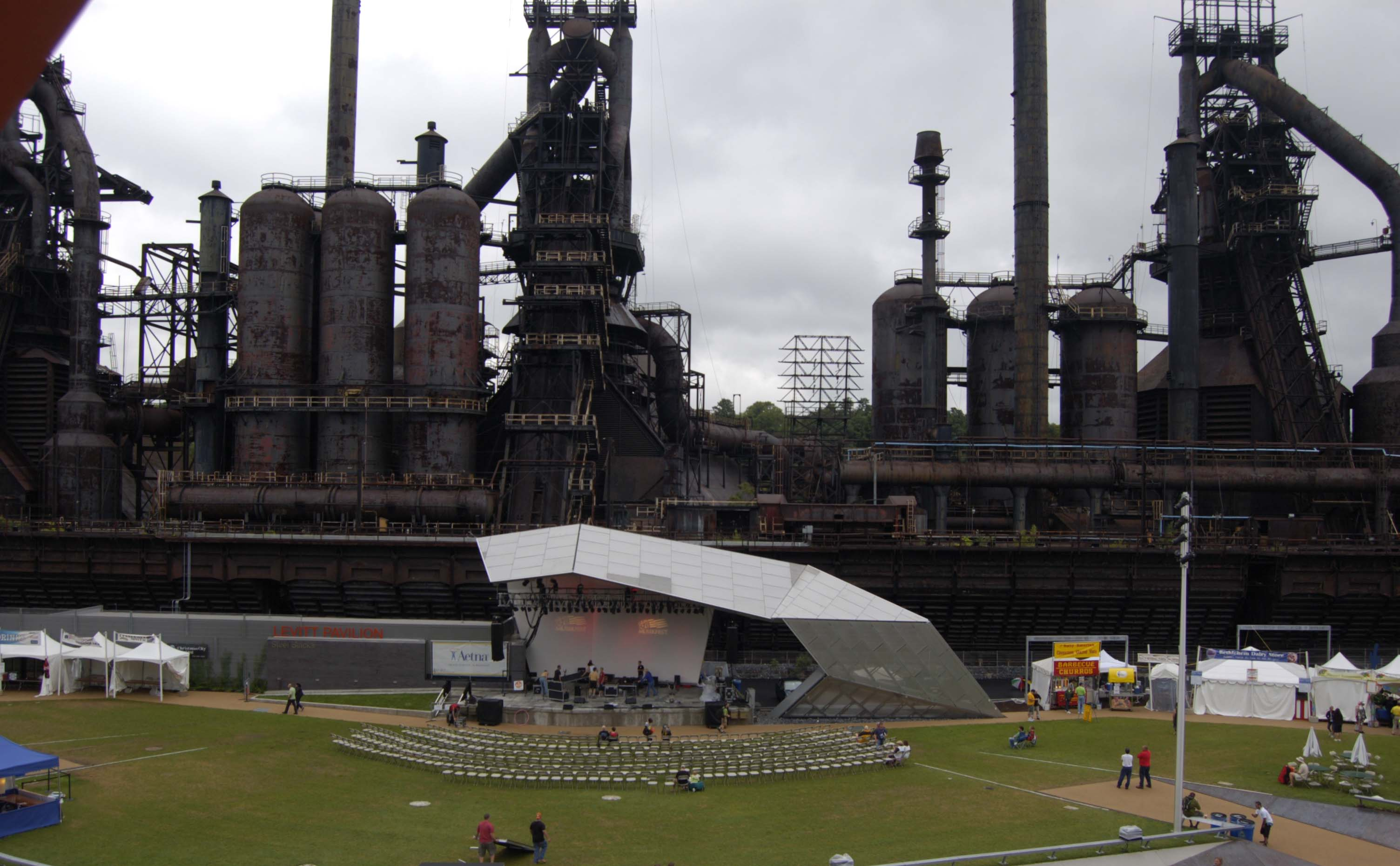
The Levitt Pavilion at SteelStacks, the former Bethlehem Steel site, is being prepared for a show

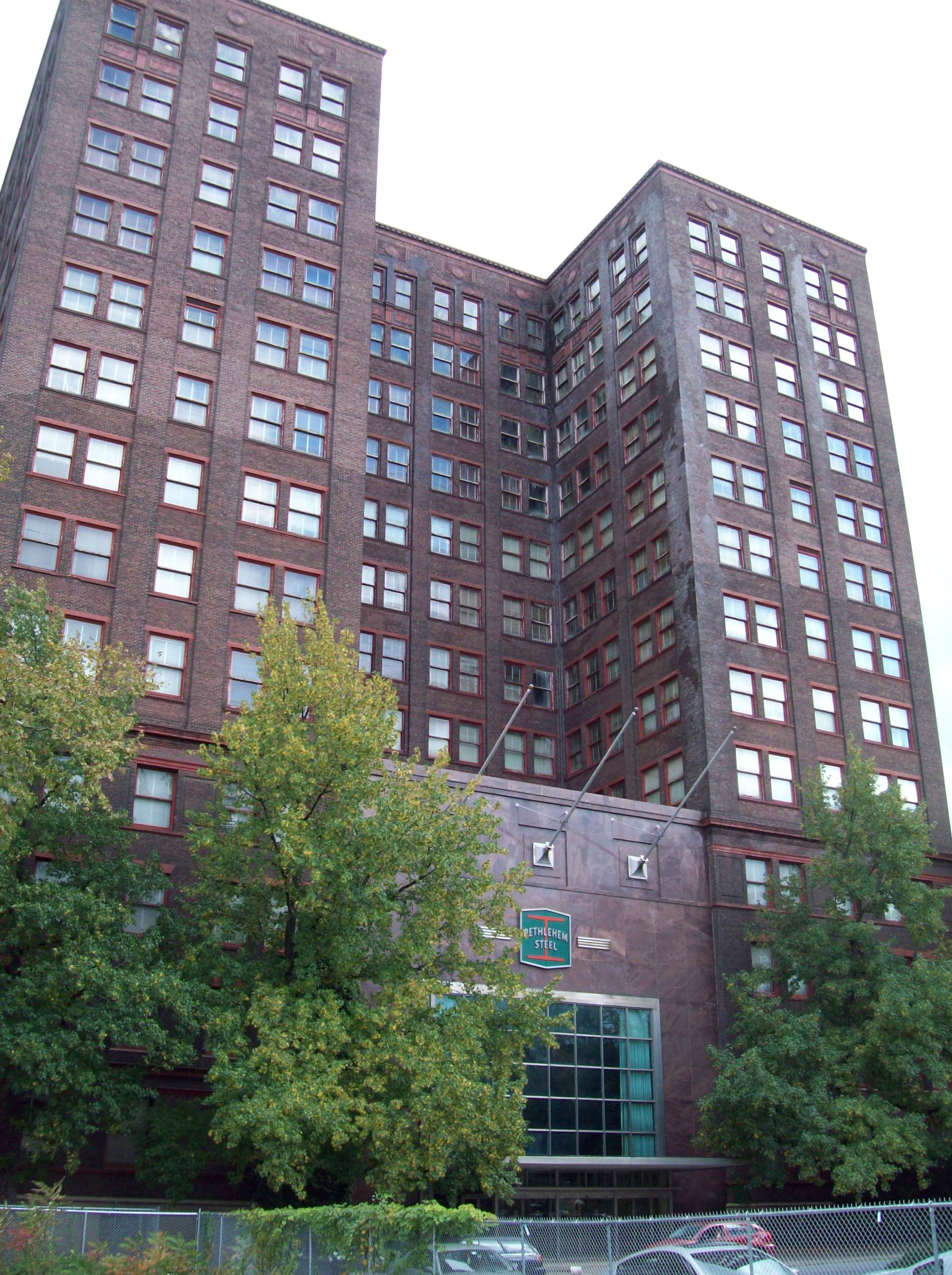
Former Bethlehem Steel Company Headquarters Building, Bethlehem, Pennsylvania, October 2011

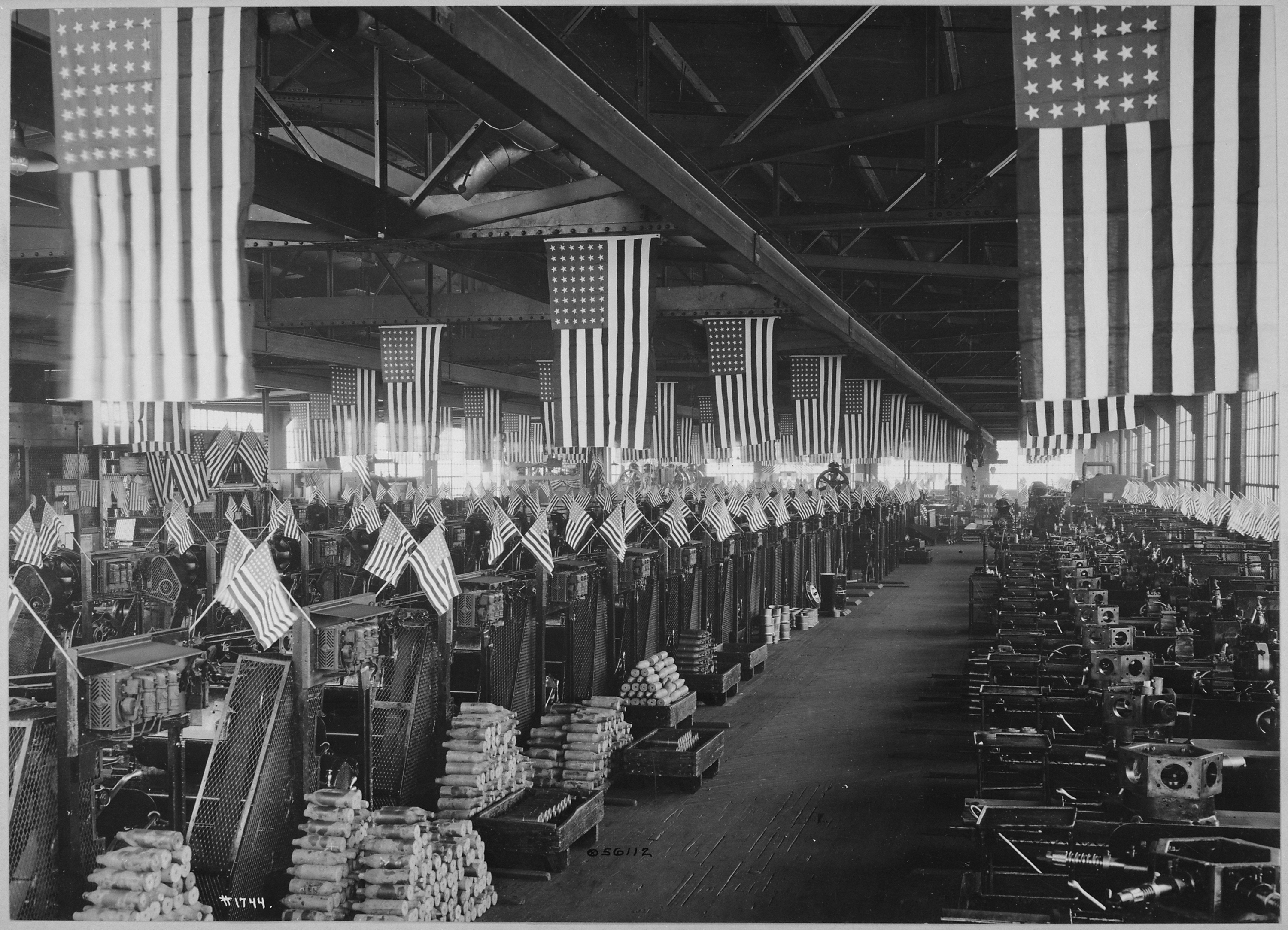
Projectile shop in Bethlehem, Pennsylvania

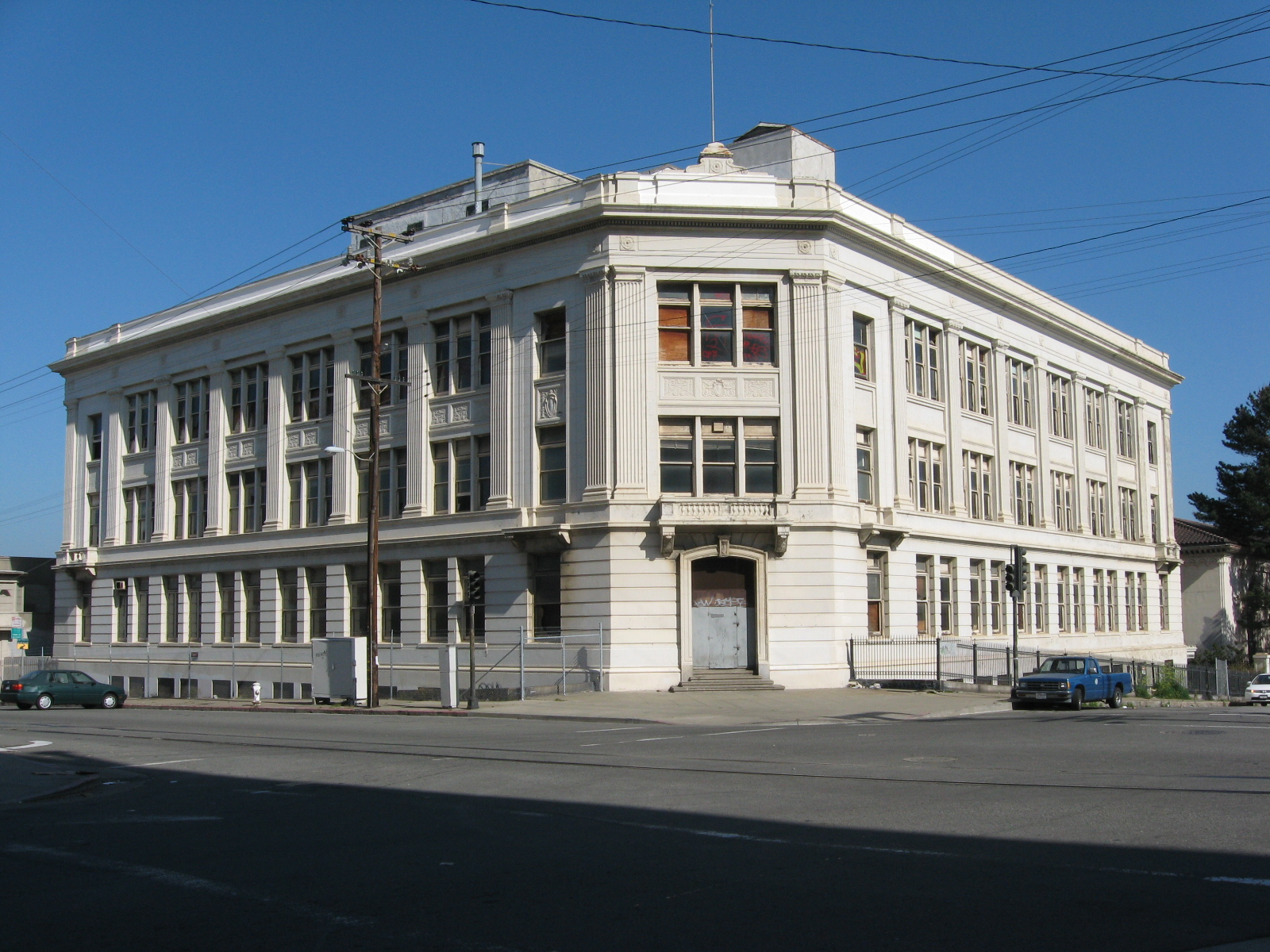
Former Bethlehem Shipbuilding Corporation headquarters in San Francisco

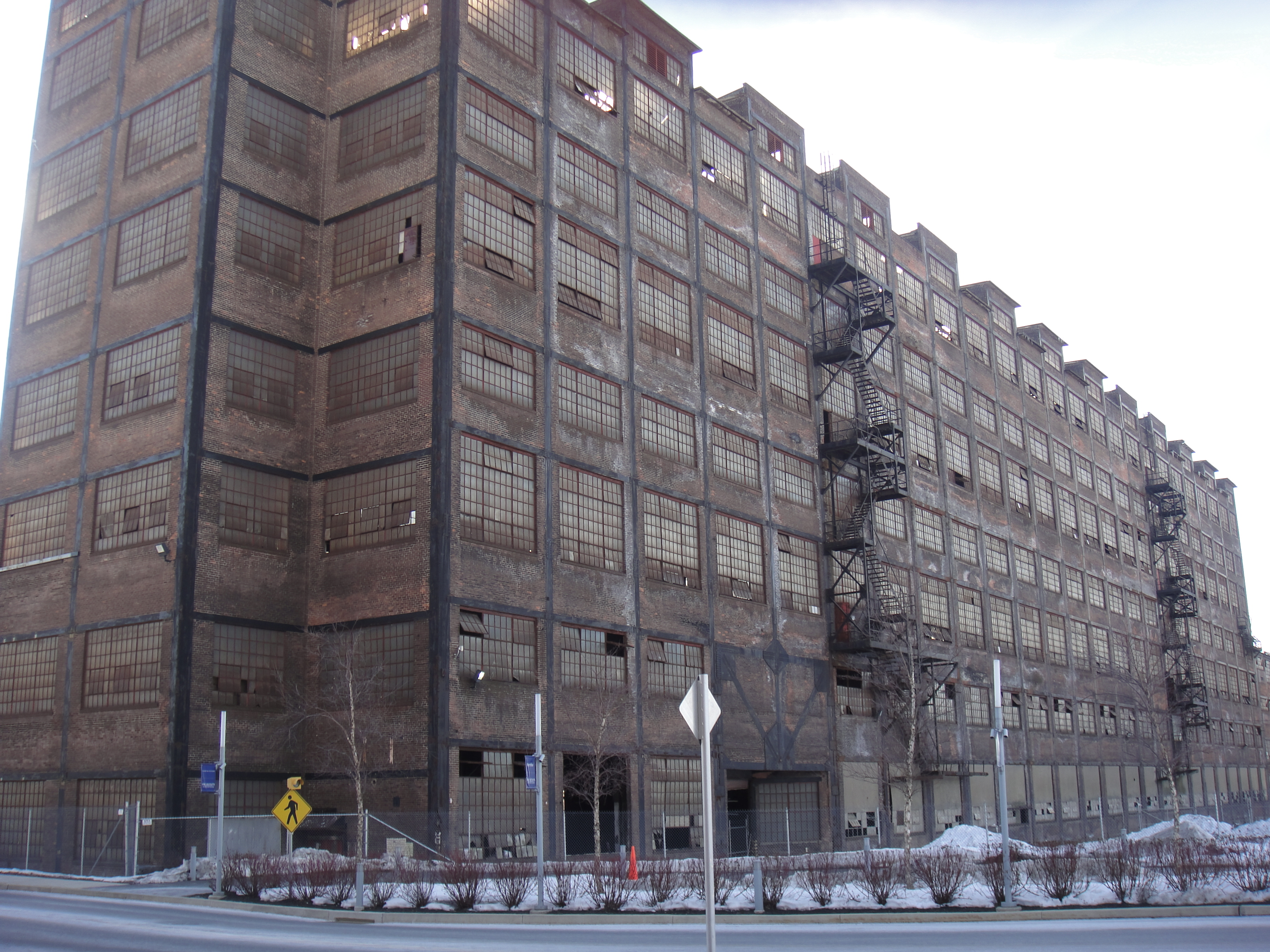
One of the few buildings that have been preserved

== Leadership ==
Presidents and chairman of the company have been:

=== President ===
1. Charles M. Schwab, 1905–1916
2. Eugene G. Grace, 1916–1945
3. Arthur B. Homer, 1945–1960
4. Edmund F. Martin, 1960–1963
5. Stewart S. Cort, 1963–1970
6. Lewis W. Foy, 1970–1974
7. Frederic W. West Jr., 1974–1979
8. Richard F. Schubert, 1979–1980
9. Walter F. Williams, 1980–

=== Chairman of the Board ===
1. Charles M. Schwab, 1905–1939
2. Eugene G. Grace, 1945–1960
3. Arthur B. Homer, 1960–1964
4. Edmund F. Martin, 1964–1970
5. Stewart S. Cort, 1970–1974
6. Lewis W. Foy, 1974–1980
7. Donald H. Trautlein, 1980–1986
8. Walter F. Williams, 1986–

== See also ==
- Allentown (song)
- Eugene Grace – American businessman (1876–1960)
- Alfred Hunt – First president of Bethlehem Iron Company
- Lackawanna Steel Company – Defunct American steel manufacturer
- List of preserved historic blast furnaces
- List of steel producers
- Martin Tower – Former high-rise in Bethlehem, Pennsylvania, U.S.
- Henry Noll
- Asa Packer – American businessman and politician
- Charles M. Schwab – American steel magnate (1862–1939)
- Joseph Wharton – American industrialist (1826–1909)
