= Martin Tower =

Former high-rise in Bethlehem, Pennsylvania, U.S.

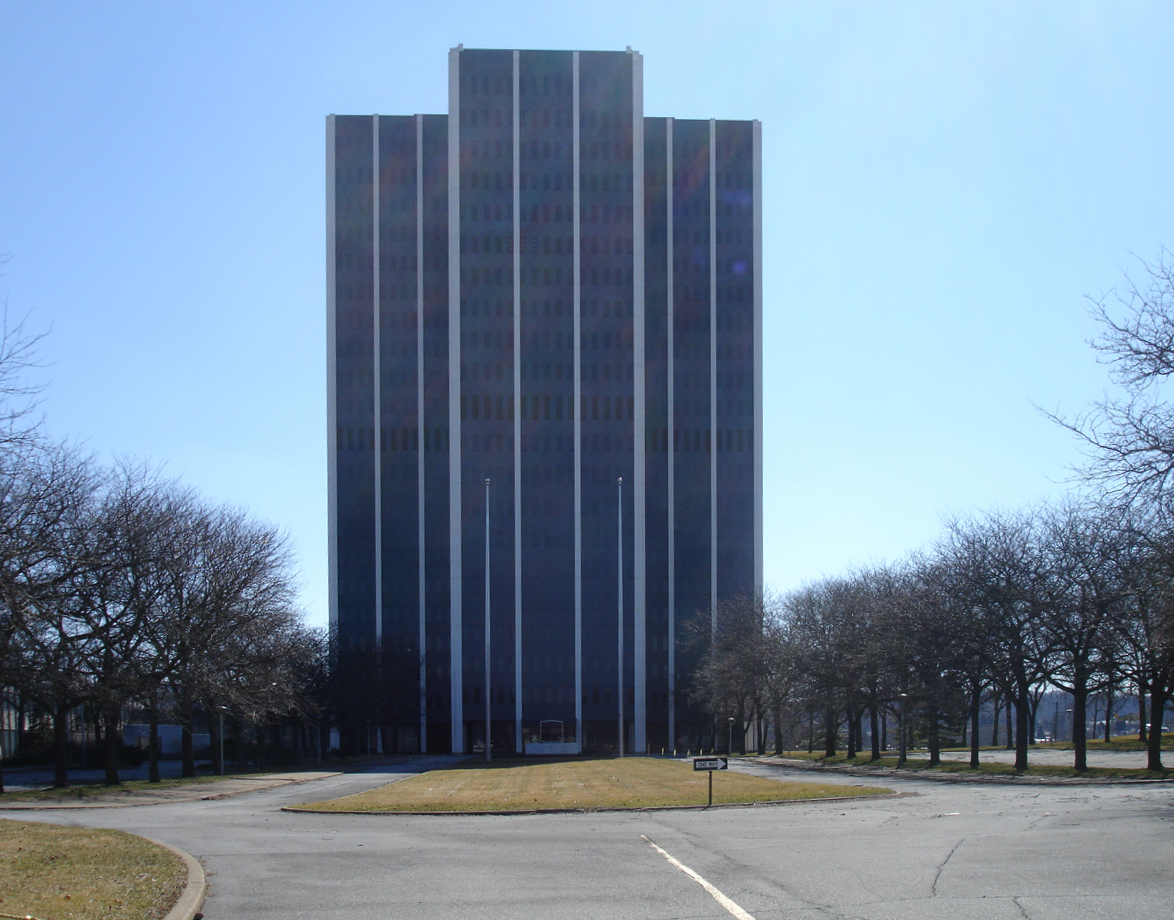
- Martin Tower in February 2012 prior to its May 2019 demolition
- Former names: Bethlehem Steel Martin Tower

General information
- Status: Demolished
- Type: Commercial offices
- Architectural style: International
- Location: 1170 8th Avenue; Bethlehem, Pennsylvania, U.S.
- Coordinates: 40.6317°N 75.3944°W
- Construction started: August 25, 1969
- Completed: August 28, 1972
- Closed: Early 2007
- Demolished: May 19, 2019
- Cost: $18.5 million
- Owner: Lewis Ronca and Norton Herrick

Height
- Roof: 101.19 m (332.0 ft)

Technical details
- Floor count: 21
- Floor area: 59,789 m^{2} (643,560 sq ft)
- Lifts/elevators: 10

Design and construction
- Architect: Haines Lundberg Waehler
- Developer: Lewis Ronca and Norton Herrick
- Martin Tower
- U.S. National Register of Historic Places
- NRHP reference No.: 10000401
- Added to NRHP: June 28, 2010

Martin Tower was a 21-story, 101.2 m (332 ft) building at 1170 8th Avenue in Bethlehem, Pennsylvania, United States. It was the tallest building in both Bethlehem and the greater Lehigh Valley, 8 ft (2.4 m) taller than the PPL Building in Allentown. Martin Tower was placed on the National Register of Historic Places on June 28, 2010. Originally built as the headquarters of now-defunct Bethlehem Steel, the building, which once dominated Bethlehem's city's skyline, was completed in 1972. It stood vacant from early 2007 until its eventual demolition on May 19, 2019.

== History ==
=== 20th century ===
Martin Tower was constructed as the corporate headquarters for Bethlehem Steel, then one of the world's largest steel manufacturers. Construction of the tower began in 1969. The building was completed and opened in 1972 and was named after then-Bethlehem Steel chairman Edmund F. Martin.

Bethlehem Steel spared little expense in their new skyscraper headquarters. The building was built in a cruciform shape rather than a more conventional square, in order to create more corner- and window-offices. The architect for Martin Tower was Haines Lundberg Waehler. It was built by George A. Fuller Construction Co. of New York City, which also built the Flatiron Building in New York in 1903, the CBS Building in New York in 1963 and 1251 Avenue of the Americas at Rockefeller Center in 1971. Under the initial plan, Bethlehem Steel was to build a second tower, which is why some people refer to it as "Martin Towers." An annex was built, intended to connect the two towers, but the second tower was never built.

The original offices were designed by decorators from New York and included wooden furniture, doorknobs with the company logo, and handwoven carpets. The building was a testament to the economic heights the Lehigh Valley reached in the 1970s before the large economic downturn caused by the decline of the steel industry. The building was a symbol of Bethlehem Steel's power, money and dominance in the steel industry. The building had 21 floors, and each floor housed a different department of the company.

When Martin Tower opened, Bethlehem Steel was the second-largest steel producer in the world and the 14th-largest industrial corporation in the nation. In 1973, the first full year the Tower was occupied, Bethlehem Steel set a company record, producing 22.3 million tons of raw steel and shipping 16.3 million tons of finished steel. It made a $207 million profit that year, and exceeded that the following year.

By 1987, a shrinking white-collar work force had the Tower sitting almost completely vacant; it was then put up for sale and other companies occupied the Tower and its annex.

=== 21st century ===
In 2001, Bethlehem Steel filed for bankruptcy and officially left Martin Tower in 2003. Several companies remained until the last tenant, Receivable Management Services, departed in 2007, leaving it completely vacant.

In 2007, the entire building became vacant, although surface parking around the building continued in use as park-and-ride lots for local festivals. Proposals to convert the building to condominiums or apartments, along with recreational and retail space on the property, proved unfeasible due to the presence of asbestos and the cost of its removal along with the housing market crash.

The City of Bethlehem subsequently applied for City Revitalization and Improvement Zone (CRIZ) designation, winning one of the two CRIZ designations on December 30, 2013. Restoration of the building, including the removal of asbestos and addition of a sprinkler system, was envisioned by the third year of the CRIZ, with renovations beginning in 2016.

In July 2015, Bethlehem Mayor Robert Donchez announced plans to rezone the Martin Tower property. The zoning at that time had allowed mostly residential in and around the building, while protecting the building from being razed. After multiple public hearings and votes, the Martin Tower property was approved on December 15, 2015, for mixed-use rezoning to allow more retail space on the property. The decision also permitted demolition of Martin Tower at the owner/developer's discretion. The public had a number of concerns about the new rezoning. Some feared it would make it easier to remove the building. Others feared it would create a third downtown in the city and create competition to business owners. City Council passed the zoning despite the concerns of a few members of the public.

On January 13, 2017, almost 10 years since the building was vacated, owners Ronca and Herrick announced removal of asbestos from the building and annex would begin, regardless of whether the Tower was ultimately renovated for adaptive reuse or demolished.

In January 2019, the owners announced their redevelopment master plan would include demolition of the tower. Martin Tower was imploded by Controlled Demolition, Inc., on May 19, 2019 at 7:03 AM EDT, at a reported cost of $575,000. Demolition officials said it was a "textbook implosion". The entire building, consisting of 6,500 cubic feet of concrete and 16,000 tons of steel, came down in only 16 seconds. Nearby roads and highways were reopened soon after it came down.

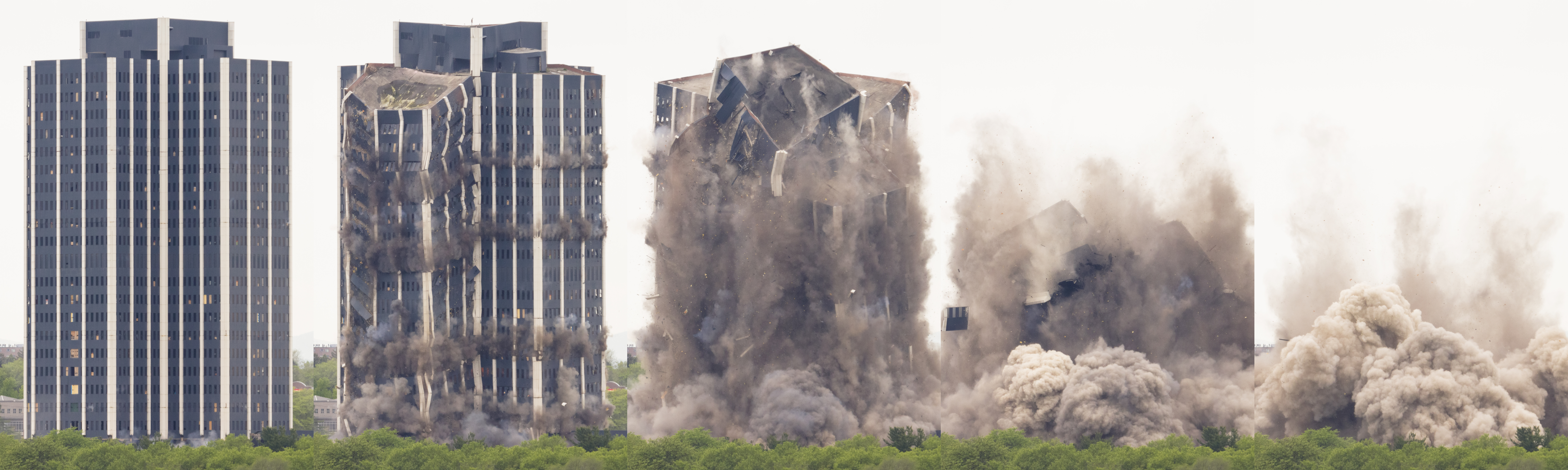
Sequence of images depicting the demolition of Martin Tower in Bethlehem, Pennsylvania on May 19, 2019

== See also ==
- National Register of Historic Places listings in Lehigh County, Pennsylvania
