= Krill (band) =

American indie rock band

- Origin: Boston, Massachusetts, U.S.
- Genres: Indie rock; math rock
- Years active: 2010–2015; 2026–present
- Label: Exploding in Sound
- Members: Jonah Furman; Ian Becker; Andrew Clinkman
- Past members: Luke Pyenson; Aaron Ratoff

Krill is an American indie rock band from Boston, Massachusetts. Founded by frontman Jonah Furman, guitarist Aaron Ratoff, and drummer Luke Pyenson (later replaced by Ian Becker), the group has released four full-length albums and two EPs.

Krill formed in 2010 in Allston, a neighborhood of Boston. Krill released their debut album, Alam No Hris, in 2012. The group released its second full-length album in 2013, titled Lucky Leaves. Krill was named a "Band to Watch" in 2013 by Stereogum. Krill released their third album in 2015, titled A Distant Fist Unclenching, through Exploding in Sound and Double Double Whammy.

In September 2015, Krill announced plans to play four final shows before breaking up. They played their final show on October 23, 2015, in Brooklyn.

In 2019, Furman, Ratoff, and Becker reunited, along with Joe DeManuelle-Hall, as Knot. The group released a self-titled album in 2020 on Exploding in Sound.

In 2026, Furman and Becker returned with new member Andrew Clinkman, and released their first recorded song in a decade, "Commemorative Plaque". Krill's fourth album, Secret Language, was released in November the same year.

== Discography ==
Albums

- Alam No Hris (not on label, 2012)
- Lucky Leaves (not on label, 2013)
- A Distant Fist Unclenching (Exploding in Sound, Double Double Whammy, 2015)
- Secret Language (Exploding in Sound, 2026)

Singles and EPs

- Steve Hears Pile in Malden and Bursts into Tears (Exploding in Sound, 2014)
- Peanut Butter (Double Double Whammy, 2014)
- Krill (Exploding in Sound, 2016)
- Commemorative Plaque (Exploding in Sound, 2026)
