= Tall Friend =

Tall Friend is an American indie pop band from Philadelphia, Pennsylvania fronted by River Pfaff.

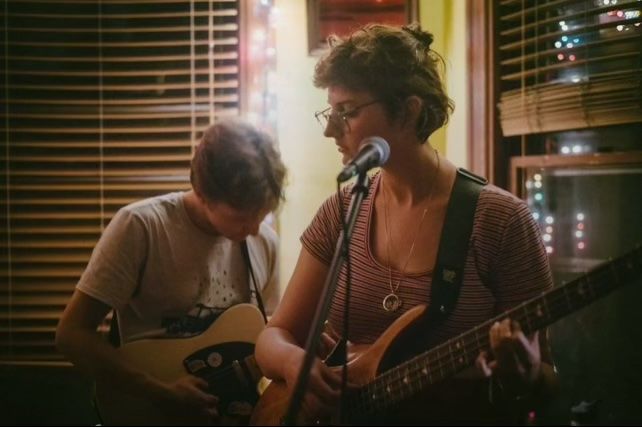
Tall Friend performing in Washington, DC in 2016

== History ==
Tall Friend released their first EP in 2016 titled Tawl Friend. On August 11, 2017, Tall Friend followed up with the release of their debut full-length album titled Safely Nobody's on Exploding in Sound. The album was named "Album of the Day" upon release by Bandcamp.

Tall Friend's song Apoptosis was listed at number 8 in Rolling Stone critic Rob Sheffield’s list of the top 25 songs of 2017.

== Discography ==
=== Studio albums ===
- Fossil (2026, Window Sill Records)
- Safely Nobody's (2017, Exploding In Sound)

=== EPs ===
- Tawl Friend (2016, self-released)
