= Bethlehem Steel (band) =

American band

- Origin: Brooklyn, New York, U.S.
- Genres: Indie rock, shoegaze
- Years active: 2012–2022
- Label: Miscreant Records Exploding in Sound Records
- Members: Rebecca Ryskalczyk; Jon Gernhart; Patrick Ronayne; Christina Puerto
- Past members: Zephyr Prusinski; Peter Katz

Bethlehem Steel is an indie rock band from Brooklyn, New York, formed in 2012. The band is composed of singer-guitarist Rebecca Ryskalczyk, bassist Patrick Ronayne, singer-guitarist Christina Puerto and drummer Jon Gernhart. Bethlehem Steel has described their band as at first "our sound was a lot softer, through the anger of everything, we were able to transform the sound of the band.” In 2016 they were named as one of 14 bands that impressed at South by Southwest. Bethlehem Steel has been known for playing the party game Ninja, which was the basis of one of their singles music videos. They have previously toured with Cold Sweats, Pleistoscene, Haybaby, Baked and Painted Zeros. In 2022, the group disbanded.

== History ==
Becca Ryskalczyk, Jon Gernhart, and Zephyr Prusinski were part of a closely knit music community while students at SUNY Fredonia, and SUNY Purchase (Zephyr Prusinski). They had played in separate bands, but knew each other well just from spending time in similar circles. Through performances at house shows and the bar and club scene of Buffalo, there were enough places for developing musicians to flourish in Western New York.

Gernhart and Ryskalczyk established a friendship that lead them to Brooklyn upon graduation of their Fredonia music community, they were the only two from their group of friends who ended up relocating southern to Brooklyn: where they continued to become close-knit while working on their musical ambitions. Gernhart ended up working in sound engineering, while Buffalo native Ryskalczyk took her time finding her place in the city; she was a nanny before fully immersing herself in the Brooklyn DIY music scene.

The original trio decided to call themselves Bethlehem Steel. In explaining why, Ryskalczyk stated "It's a good way to stay connected to the industrial cities from which they all hail originally." Additionally, paying tribute to her hometown prevented Ryskalczyk from feeling as though she was abandoning her past.

Ryskalczyk added Ronayne on Bass in 2016 after a friendship formed at Brooklyns now defunct DIY venue Shea Stadium, where both worked. After releasing their album Party Naked Forever, Bethlehem Steel added a second guitarist, Christina Puerto, to the band.

== Style ==
After seeing them at SXSW, Robin Hilton of NPR's All Songs Considered described their sound as "gloriously loud fuzzy rock." All Songs Considered featured the band's song “Yeah, I’m Okay With My Shit Life.” Hilton went on saying that there's been lot of comparisons between Generation X and the Millennials over the years, they're exactly the same, nothing's changed. He expanded, "The complaint about Gen Xer's were they’re lazy and don’t care. They’re the whatever generation. And I felt like when I was watching a lot of the younger bands at South by this year I really felt like that vibe is coming back. The whatever rock, and I loved it." Bob Boilen and Robin Hilton coined the genre name of 'Whatever Rock'/Shrug Rock, naming Bethlehem Steel as their source.

In 2016, Bethlehem Steel was also named by USA Today's FTW!Culture writer Nate Scott as one of 14 bands that impressed at SXSW. Scott labeled their sound as moody and ethereal.Stereogum writers awarded the band with the yearbook style superlative of "Most Likely to Tell it How it Is." The Village Voice wrote: "Even though Bethlehem Steel's music retains some lo-fi elements and a punk ethos, the foundation built for a bigger, more accessible sound is a sturdy one."

Nick Sessanna of Buffalo-based music source, Buffablog, explained Bethlehem Steel: "Try to imagine Waxahatchee fronting Pinkerton-era Weezer for a second… If that’s too obscure, other comparisons could be drawn to buzzing indie queens Courtney Barnett, Colleen Green, or even Rochester’s Pleistocene."

With the release of their first studio album, BrooklynVegan's Andrew Sacher describes the record's sound as "It’s kinda got a Waxahatchee vibe in the way it combines singer/songwriter type stuff with loud, crunchy indie rock, and singer Rebecca Ryskalczyk’s truly soaring voice makes Bethlehem Steel really stand out."

== Members ==
Current

- Rebecca Ryskalczyk – guitar, vocals (2012–2022)
- Jon Gernhart – drums (2012–2022)
- Patrick Ronayne – bass (2016–2022)
- Christina Puerto – guitar, vocals (2018–2022)

Former

- Zephyr Prusinski – bass (2013-2016)
- Peter Katz – bass (2016)

Timeline

== Discography ==
=== Studio albums ===
Title	Album details
Party Naked Forever	Released: November 10, 2017; Label: Exploding In Sound; Formats: LP, MC, Digital download
Bethlehem Steel	Released: September 13, 2019; Label: Exploding In Sound; Formats: LP, MC, Digital download

=== Extended plays ===
Title	Album details
Grow Up	Released: June 12, 2013; Label: Miscreant Records (re-issued MCT 010); Formats: LP, Digital download
Docking	Released: November 6, 2015; Label: Miscreant Records; Formats: MC, Digital download

=== Singles ===
Title	Details
"Fake Sweater"	Released: November 30, 2018; Label: Exploding In Sound; Part of Split EP with Washer; Formats: 7" Single, Digital download
"Bad Girl"	Released: July 24, 2019; Label: Exploding In Sound; Formats: Digital download

=== Music videos ===
Title	Year	Director(s)
"Guts"	2014	Bethlehem Steel
"87s"	2015	Adam Kolodny
"Florida 2"	2018	Uncredited Director
"Fake Sweater"	2018	Becca Ryskalczyk; Adam Kolodny (DP)
"Bad Girl"	2019	Becca Ryskalczyk
