= Exploding in Sound =

US independent record label

Exploding In Sound Records
- Founded: 2011
- Founder: Dan Goldin; Dave Spak
- Genre: Post-hardcore; Indie rock Alternative rock Outsider music
- Country of origin: United States
- Location: New York City
- Official website: explodinginsoundrecords.com

Exploding in Sound is an American independent record label started by Post-Trash founder Dan Goldin and Dave Spak while students at Northeastern University. It is based in New York City. The label was founded in 2011 and has released albums from Speedy Ortiz, Pile, LVL UP, and Porches.

== History ==
=== Beginning in Boston ===
Dan Goldin had been working at Island Def Jam Music Group but was dissatisfied working with music he didn't quite enjoy as much as the bands he and Spak had been seeing at local shows around the area. While working at Def Jam, Goldin decided to start operating a music blog which was the first appearance of the Exploding in Sound name. According to an interview with Consequence of Sound, Goldin stated: "If I can do this blog long enough to where it develops an audience, I can eventually start a label which in theory, has a built-in audience with that same taste." Together, Goldin and Spak decided it would be a good idea to start a record label to showcase some of the homegrown acts.

=== Move and first releases ===
In 2011, Goldin moved to New York City, which led to the signing of Boston band Pile on October 16 while they were playing a CMJ showcase. At the time, Spak had relocated to Scranton, Pennsylvania. Exploding in Sound's first release was Grass is Green's "Ronson," released on CD followed by Speedy Ortiz's "Sports EP," the label's first record pressing. Before the end of 2012, the label had two more releases including the "Split Dicks" seven-inch split featuring Grass is Green and Two Inch Astronaut, and Pile's "Dripping."

=== Expansion ===
The following summer, Speedy Ortiz released their debut album, Major Arcana on Carpark Records while continuing to be a part of the Exploding In Sound family, with Sadie Dupis providing vocals on Ovlov's "am" released July, 2013. The label would go on to put out a total of 19 additional releases including Massachusetts bands Fat History Month, Krill, Kal Marks and Ponybones (featuring Speedy Ortiz original guitarist Matt Robidoux.) In October 2013, Goldin and Spak put on an unofficial CMJ showcase at the Silent Barn in Brooklyn, New York which also acted as the label's second birthday celebration. According to Stereogum, "It was a feeling that built over the 11-band lineup. It was more than just “a showcase,” it was bigger than CMJ, and it cements EIS as the most exciting rock label in years. This one show had more energy and excitement (both from audience and performers) than entire festivals." Goldin would call the show one of his favorites in a Summer, 2014 interview with Interviewtion. In a 2015 interview with Allston Pudding, Goldin described the showcase as a turning point, one of the "little affirmations here and there that keep it going."

In 2015, Exploding in Sound hosted "a five-day, six-show celebration" in Boston and New York. Said Goldin to The Village Voice, "The idea originally was to have every band that we released something for play at least one of the nights." As of September 2015, the Exploding in Sound roster contains thirty-three artists.

=== Artists ===
- Anna Altman
- Bad History Month
- Baked
- Bethlehem Steel
- Big Heet
- Big Ups
- Blacklisters
- Bueno
- Cusp
- Dan Francia
- Dirty Dishes
- Disco Doom
- Dust from 1000 Yrs
- Eugene Quell
- Ex-Breathers
- Fat History Month
- Flagland
- Fond Han
- Geronimo!
- Gnarwhal
- Grass Is Green
- Human People
- J&L Defer
- Jackal Onasis
- June Gloom
- Kal Marks
- Krill
- Leapling
- Lost Boy ?
- LVL UP
- Maneka
- Milked
- Mister Goblin
- My Dad
- Nyxy Nyx
- Ovlov
- Palehound
- Palm
- Philadelphia Collins
- Pile
- Pony Bones
- Porches
- Rick Rude
- Rock Solid
- Shady Bug
- Shell of a Shell
- Soft Fangs
- Speedy Ortiz
- Spook the Herd
- Stove
- Swings
- Tall Friend
- Two Inch Astronaut
- Washer
- Water from Your Eyes
- Woozy
- Yazan
