= Green Pond =

Green Pond may refer to the following places in the United States:

- Green Pond, Alabama, an unincorporated community in Bibb County
- Green Pond, Florida, an area in Polk County
- Green Pond, New Jersey, both a lake and a private lakeside residential community in New Jersey
- Green Pond (Stillwater, New York), a lake in New York
- Green Pond (Stillwater Mountain, New York), a lake in New York
- Green Pond, South Carolina, an unincorporated community
- Green Pond, Virginia, an unincorporated community in Pittsylvania County
- Green Pond Marsh, a wetlands area in Bethlehem Township, Northampton County, Pennsylvania
