= SS Deltargentino =

SS Deltargentino may refer to one of two Type C3-P&C ships built for the United States Maritime Commission by Bethlehem Sparrows Point Shipyard and intended for the Mississippi Shipping Company:

- SS Deltargentino (1940) (MC hull number 50), designated for transfer to the United States Navy as transport USS J. W. McAndrew (AP-47), but instead went to United States Army as USAT J. W. McAndrew; collided with Béarn in 1945; sold for commercial use in 1947; scrapped 1972
- SS Deltargentino (1942) (MC hull number 152), transferred to the United States Navy as transport USS Monrovia (AP-64); later converted to an attack transport and redesignated APA-31; scrapped 1968
