= SS Delorleans =

SS Delorleans may refer to one of two Type C3-P&C ships built for the United States Maritime Commission by Bethlehem Sparrows Point Shipyard and intended for the Mississippi Shipping Company:

- SS Delorleans (1940) (MC hull number 49), delivered to Mississippi Shipping in August 1940; acquired by the United States Navy as transport USS Crescent City (AP-40) in June 1941; later converted to an attack transport and redesignated APA-21; served as training ship Golden Bear for the California Maritime Academy; as Artship, she was scrapped in 2012
- SS Delorleans (1942) (MC hull number 151), transferred to the United States Navy as transport USS Calvert (AP-65); later converted to an attack transport and redesignated APA-32; later scrapped
