= SS Agawam =

Steam cargo ship built in 1917–1918

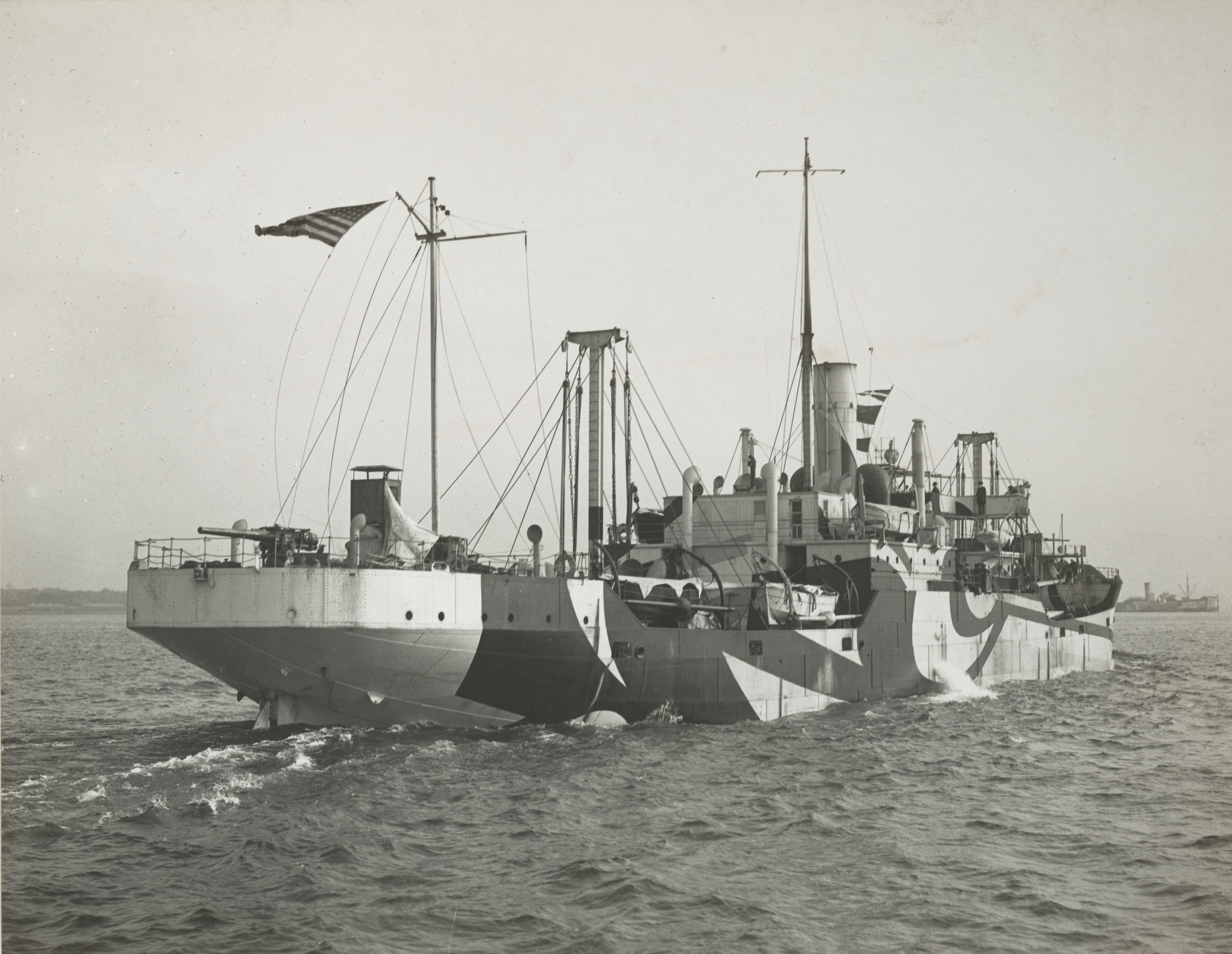
- SS Agawam during sea trials in 1918.

History

United States
- Name: Agawam
- Owner: USSB
- Operator: States Marine & Commercial Co. (1919); Mississippi Shipping Co. (1919–1921)
- Ordered: 14 September 1917
- Builder: Submarine Boat Company, Newark
- Cost: $1,048,635.20
- Yard number: 1
- Laid down: 20 December 1917
- Launched: 30 May 1918
- Sponsored by: Miss Mary Eurana Ward
- Completed: 1 October 1918
- Maiden voyage: 1 January 1919
- In service: 17 December 1918
- Home port: Newark
- Identification: US Official number 216996; Call sign LNDF
- Fate: Broken up, 1926

General characteristics
- Type: Design 1023 ship
- Tonnage: 3,658 GRT; 2,214 NRT; 5,085 DWT
- Length: 324.0 ft (98.8 m)
- Beam: 46.2 ft (14.1 m)
- Draft: 22 ft 9 1/2 in (6.947 m) (loaded)
- Depth: 25.0 ft (7.6 m)
- Installed power: 1,500 ihp
- Propulsion: Westinghouse Electric steam turbine double reduction geared to one screw
- Speed: 10 1/2 knots (19.4 km/h)

Agawam was a steam cargo ship built in 1917–1918 by Submarine Boat Company of Newark for the United States Shipping Board (USSB) as part of the wartime shipbuilding program of the Emergency Fleet Corporation (EFC) to restore the nation's Merchant Marine. The vessel was chiefly employed on the East Coast and Mexican Gulf to United Kingdom routes throughout her brief career, and was eventually laid up and scrapped in 1926.

== Design and construction ==
After the United States entry into World War I, a large shipbuilding program was undertaken to restore and enhance shipping capabilities both of the United States and their Allies. As part of this program, EFC placed orders with nation's shipyards for a large number of vessels of standard designs. Design 1023 cargo ship was a standard cargo freighter of approximately 5,300 tons deadweight designed by Submarine Boat Corp. and adopted by USSB.

Agawam was the first vessel of the first order for 50 vessels placed by USSB with Submarine Boat Corp. on 14 September 1917. The ship was laid down at the shipbuilder's yard on 20 December 1917 (yard number 1) and launched on 30 May 1918, with Miss Mary Eurana Ward, niece of Charles M. Schwab president of the Bethlehem Steel Corporation and acting Director General of the Emergency Fleet Corporation, being the sponsor. As with many other vessels built for the Shipping Board, the name of the vessel was picked up by Mrs. Woodrow Wilson who often chose Native American words. The occasion represented the first launching of a fabricated vessel on the Atlantic coast and was widely celebrated. There were nearly 15,000 people in attendance with many dignitaries such as Charles M. Schwab, Charles P. Gillen, mayor of Newark, Charles A. Stone of the American International Corporation, George Westinghouse, Archibald Johnston of the Bethlehem Steel, Thomas Edison, Congressman R. Wayne Parker and W. Averell Harriman of the Merchants Shipbuilding Corporation among others.

Similar to all vessels of this class the ship had three islands and one main deck, had machinery situated amidships and had four main holds, both fore and aft, which allowed for the carriage of variety of goods and merchandise. The vessel also possessed all the modern machinery for quick loading and unloading of cargo from five large hatches, including ten winches and ten booms. She was also equipped with wireless apparatus and had electrical lights installed along the deck.

As built, the ship was 324.0 feet (98.8 m) long (between perpendiculars) and 46.2 feet (14.1 m) abeam and had a depth of 25.0 feet (7.6 m). Agawam was originally assessed at 3,658 GRT and 2,214 NRT and had deadweight of approximately 5,100. The vessel had a steel hull with double bottom throughout and a single turbine rated at 1,500 shp, double reduction geared to a single screw propeller, that moved the ship at up to 10 1/2 knots (12.1 mph; 19.4 km/h). The steam for the engine was supplied by two Babcock & Wilcox Water Tube boilers fitted for oil fuel.

The vessel had her dock engine trials performed on 19 September 1918 and construction was officially finalized on 1 October. Agawam left the yard on October 7 to load fuel oil and then proceed for loading. However, the oil overflowed from her fuel pipes and she was forced to return to the yard for repairs. On October 22 the vessel made a short trial trip to Yonkers and back and was tentatively accepted by the Shipping Board pending repairs to her engines. At about the same time she also took on board a cargo of 4,093 tons of refined sugar destined for Italy. The ship had another trial trip with her being fully loaded at the end of October, again showing continuous problems with the engines. After burnt out engine gears were replaced, Agawam went on a forty hour long trial trip on December 12–13 during which the vessel performed satisfactorily, reaching maximum speed of 11.11 knots. The ship was officially accepted by USSB representatives on 17 December 1918 and Agawam sailed out next day bound for Genoa. However, only three days later she radioed that she was returning and upon reaching Staten Island it was discovered the ship somehow had salt water in her boilers.

== Operational history ==
Upon finalizing all the repairs, Agawam finally started out on her maiden voyage on 1 January 1919 with the same cargo of sugar loaded back in October. Soon after departure the vessel encountered very heavy weather. Due to her oil fuel being too dense and dirty her oil supply system became choked with sediment and she was only able to proceed at half speed. In addition, rampant seasickness among the engine crew and exhaustion of fresh water supplies for her boilers forced Agawam to put into Bermuda on 7 January 1919. The ship had to wait for a Westinghouse engineer to arrive and make repairs and adjustments to the vessel's engines and oil supply system. The ship also loaded approximately 200 tons of light fuel oil to reduce the density of her fuel. Agawam was finally able to leave Hamilton on 29 January 1919 but was further delayed for two days at St. George's due to heavy gale sweeping over Bermuda. After a largely uneventful trip Agawam reached Genoa on 18 February but was directed by Italian authorities to proceed to Naples which was reached next day. After finishing unloading her cargo, Agawam left Naples on her return trip on March 10 and after passage through stormy weather arrived at New York on April 2, successfully concluding her ninety-two day long maiden voyage. The freighter made one more trip with grain to Constantinople and Batoum in the summer of 1919 returning to Philadelphia at the end of July.

The vessel was subsequently allocated by USSB to Mississippi Shipping Company to serve on their Gulf to United Kingdom route. The vessel left Philadelphia at the end of September for loading at New Orleans arriving at her destination on October 3. Agawam departed Port Eads with a cargo of barley on October 13 bound for Hull. While en route she received a distress call from Norwegian steamer SS Seypen who lost her propeller shaft and was drifting helplessly. Agawam came to her rescue and after a day long struggle in heavy gale a tow line was finally put aboard the stricken steamer who was then towed into St. Michael's on October 31. Agawam was then able to continue her voyage arriving in England on November 12. After unloading her cargo she sailed from England back to United States on December 17 but was forced to put in into Harwich with damaged rudder six days later. After finalizing the repairs the ship proceeded to Barry and from there to Gibraltar with a cargo of coal. Agawam departed for North America in mid-April and arrived in New Orleans on 16 May 1920. The freighter conducted two more trips to England during the course of 1920 on behalf of the Mississippi Shipping Co. In February 1921 she made one trip from New Orleans and Charleston to Salonika returning to Savannah in early May 1921. On her next trip Agawam left Savannah on June 8 loaded with 7,866 bales of cotton bound for Liverpool but was forced to put in into Hampton Roads with engine problems ten days later. The freighter then caught fire which was quickly extinguished with the help of three fire tugs. The vessel and her cargo were subsequently libeled for $150,000 for assistance rendered during fire by tugs' owners and detained in port pending court action. After United States Supreme Court ruled the vessel and her cargo were to be released, and an assessment determined it was safe for the ship to travel, Agawam sailed out from Norfolk on June 26. Agawam conducted one more trip to England from New Orleans in early September returning to Norfolk on October 22. The vessel was then returned to the Shipping Board as overabundance of available tonnage and scarcity of cargo forced many shipping companies to significantly downsize their fleets. Agawam was moored with many other vessels in James River and eventually became part of the Reserve Fleet managed by EFC.

In order to further alleviate the problem of excessive available tonnage, USSB developed a plan in early part of 1925 to scrap a large number of smaller vessels in their possession. In early June 1925 USSB started collecting bids to scrap 200 ships, mostly Lake-type, with deadweight under or about 5,000. Many bids were entered, but eventually USSB accepted the bid by the Ford Motor Company for $1,706,000. The offer was formally accepted by the Shipping Board in August and after further negotiations with Ford Motor Co. the deal was struck in October 1925. Agawam was part of these negotiations and was broken up for scrap at some point in 1926.
