= USS George F. Elliott (AP-105) =

American cargo liner ship

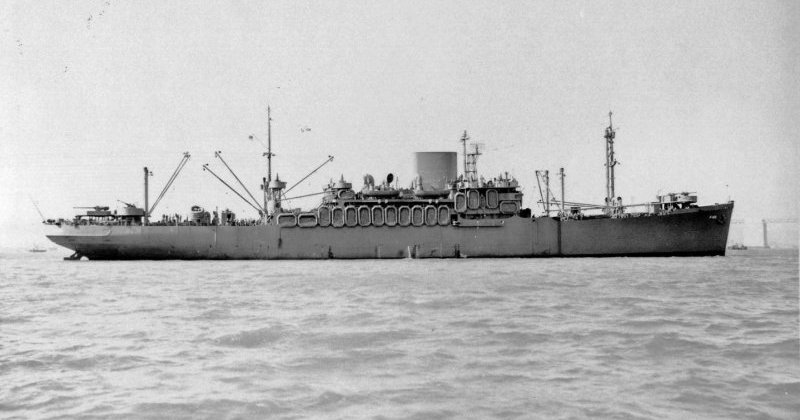
- USS George F. Elliott (AP-105) off San Francisco, 7 February 1944.

History

United States
- Name: Delbrasil (1939); George F. Elliott (1943); African Endeavor (1948)
- Owner: Mississippi Shipping Company (1939); WSA (1944); Farrell Lines Inc. (1948)
- Operator: Delta Line (1940); Delta Line for WSA (1942); U.S. Navy (1943–1946); Reserve fleet (1946–1948); American South African Lines (Farrell Lines) (1948)
- Port of registry: United States
- Route: U.S. Gulf Coast to East Coast of South America
- Builder: Bethlehem Steel
- Launched: 16 December 1939
- Sponsored by: Mrs. Maria Martins (wife of Brazilian ambassador)
- Christened: Delbrasil
- Completed: 1939
- Maiden voyage: 20 June 1940
- In service: June 1940
- Home port: New Orleans
- Identification: Official number: 239616

General characteristics
- Type: MC hull type C3-P, MC hull no. 48
- Tonnage: 7,977 GRT
- Length: 468 ft 1 in (142.7 m)
- Beam: 65 ft 7 in (20.0 m)
- Draft: 26 ft 7 in (8.1 m)
- Propulsion: Geared turbine drive, 2 x Babcock & Wilcox header-type boilers, single screw, designed shaft horsepower 8,500
- Speed: 17.8 knots

United States
- Name: USS George F. Elliott (AP-105)
- Namesake: Commandant George F. Elliott USMC (1846–1931)
- Owner: Mississippi Shipping Company (1939); WSA (1944)
- Operator: U.S. Navy (1943–1946)
- Acquired: 25 August 1943
- Commissioned: 23 September 1943
- Decommissioned: 10 June 1946
- Notes: Ship ownership transferred from Mississippi Shipping Company to War Shipping Administration on 4 February 1944 with WSA retaining ownership during remainder of Navy operation.

General characteristics
- Type: MC hull type C3-P, MC hull no. 48
- Displacement: 14,247 long tons (14,476 t)
- Length: 491 ft (150 m)
- Beam: 65 ft (20 m)
- Draft: 25 ft 8 in (7.82 m)
- Propulsion: Geared turbine drive, 2 x Babcock & Wilcox header-type boilers, single screw, designed shaft horsepower 8,500
- Speed: 17.8 knots (33.0 km/h)
- Troops: 1,908
- Complement: 302
- Armament: 1 × 5"/38 cal. dual purpose gun; 4 × 3"/50 caliber dp guns; 16 × 20 mm AA guns; 10 × .50 cal (12.7 mm) MG

USS George F. Elliott (AP-105) was a cargo liner built for the Mississippi Shipping Company as SS Delbrasil for operation between New Orleans and the east coast of South America in 1939 by its operator, Delta Line. The ship entered that service and operated until taken over by the War Shipping Administration (WSA) on 28 April 1942 for operation by Delta Line acting as WSA's agent. On 25 August 1943 WSA allocated the ship to the Navy for conversion to a troop transport commissioned and operated by the Navy for the duration of the war. Ownership of the ship was transferred from Mississippi Shipping to WSA on 4 February 1944 while under Navy operation and was retained until sale to American South African Lines on 22 December 1948. The ship was renamed African Endeavor until returned as a trade in to the Maritime Commission on 22 September 1960 for layup in the James River reserve fleet and later sold to Boston Metals for scrapping.

== Construction ==
Delbrasil was the first of three cargo and passenger liners, the later ships being SS Delorleans and SS Deltargentino, built for Delta Line operation with close cooperation between the U.S. Maritime Commission and the company's management to be the first passenger cargo vessels in the country meeting all current safety and efficiency requirements. Naval architect V. M. Friede of New Orleans executed the company's particular design for the series of six ships and was later named the company's consulting naval architect.

The ship's design was based on a Maritime Commission (CP-3) type with Delbrasil being built in 1939 by Bethlehem Steel at Sparrows Point, Maryland. The ship was launched at 11:00 a.m. on 16 December 1939, sponsored by the wife of the Brazilian ambassador, Mrs. Maria Martins and intended for Delta Line, the Mississippi Shipping Company's operator, for service between the U.S. Gulf Coast and the East Coast of South America. The ship was delivered to the Mississippi Shipping Company on 31 May 1940.

The design was of a ship with six cargo holds and twenty-six staterooms for sixty-seven passengers and passenger spaces comparable to larger luxury liners that included a two deck high passenger entry hall, overlooked by the passenger lounge, with staircases to accommodations and the main dining hall that could seat seventy with a small private dining area seating ten. An unusual feature was provision for boarding and entering the entry hall from the boat deck as well as main embarkation entry due to the fact that at certain stages of the Mississippi River the entry hall would be below the levee height.

== Delta Line operation ==
Delbrasil began operation with Delta Line on a maiden voyage departing from New Orleans' Market Street Wharf on 20 June 1940 to Brazil, Uruguay and Argentina on a route that passed close enough to islands of the West Indies to view beaches and the initial port of Recife before arrival in Rio de Janeiro on 4 July and continuation via Santos, Montevideo and termination at Buenos Aires for return by a similar route that would be the ship's normal commercial run.

Commercial service continued until taken over by the War Shipping Administration on 28 April 1942 for wartime operations by Delta Line acting as the WSA agent.

== U.S. Navy service ==
Delbrasil was allocated by WSA to the United States Navy under a sub-bareboat charter at San Francisco on 25 August 1943 to serve as the troop transport George F. Elliott during World War II. She was commissioned as USS George F. Elliott on 23 September 1943 as the second US Navy ship to bear the name (the first being the transport AP-13, which was lost to enemy action in August 1942).

From 3 October 1943 to 31 January 1944 two troop-carrying voyages out of San Diego brought fighting men to Nouméa, Guadalcanal, and Espiritu Santo. On 4 February title to the ship was transferred from Mississippi Shipping Company to WSA while the ship was at sea. Subsequently, George F. Elliott left San Francisco on 18 February to embark cargo and over 1,700 sailors and marines at Port Hueneme. She steamed thence to Havannah Harbor, New Hebrides, arriving on 9 March, and for the next two months made troop shuttle voyages between Espiritu Santo, Guadalcanal, the Russell Islands, Manus, and New Guinea before putting in at Pearl Harbor on 7 May 1944.

=== Invasion of Saipan ===
On 29 May George F. Elliott departed with attack Group 1 of Task Force 52 for the invasion of the strategic island of Saipan and closed the island's west coast on 15 June for D-day. She was ordered to join a diversionary assault force staging a demonstration landing to the northwest to divert the enemy from the real landing beaches. Despite air attack she sent troops away and unloaded cargo until getting underway on 22 June for Makin Atoll, Tarawa, Apamama, Pearl Harbor, and finally San Diego, reaching there on 17 July.

=== Invasion of Leyte ===
Following a troop transport voyage to Pearl Harbor and return, George F. Elliott made another trip to Pearl Harbor, she sailed from there on 15 September for Eniwetok, Manus, and Leyte, reaching the latter port in time for D-day, 20 October 1944. She debarked troops and cargo though harassed by air attacks, getting underway on 24 October with mission accomplished and closing Hollandia on the 29th.

=== Invasion of Luzon ===
George F. Elliott brought troops and supplies from Wake Island, New Guinea; and Hollandia in early November, and after embarking more cargo and passengers at Cape Gloucester, New Britain, reached Manus on 21 December. She sailed for Lingayen Gulf on 31 December and, after witnessing a kamikaze crash on the carrier USS Kitkun Bay (CVE-71) and numerous attacks on other ships off Luzon, reached her destination on 9 January 1945 as part of the D-day invasion of Lingayen Gulf.

Discharging men and equipment, the ship sailed at once for Leyte, Manus, and Wake Island, loaded the 33rd Infantry Division at the latter port, and debarked it at Lingayen Gulf on 10 February. Subsequently, steaming to Ulithi she embarked Marine reinforcements destined for Iwo Jima and closed that island on 18 March. Loading veterans, she sailed for Pearl Harbor and San Francisco, steaming under the Golden Gate on 22 April 1945 to commence repairs.

A round-trip voyage out of San Francisco brought seabees from Port Hueneme to Okinawa from 30 May–15 August 1945.

=== After hostilities ===
As part of the Magic Carpet fleet, George F. Elliott subsequently made three more round trips from San Francisco, respectively to Pearl Harbor, Yokosuka, and Korea, from 27 August 1945 to 18 January 1946, and her return to Seattle. Underway for Guam on 14 February, she touched there on 1 March and soon sailed for Norfolk, Virginia where she put in on 3 April 1946 via the Panama Canal. The ship was decommissioned at Norfolk on 10 June 1946 and returned to the War Shipping Administration and the reserve fleet at Lee Hall, Virginia on 11 June. The ship was struck from the Navy List on 19 June 1946.

George F. Elliott was awarded four battle stars for her World War II service.

== Return to commercial service ==
The ship was taken out of reserve and operated under charter to the Maritime Administration by American South African Line (Farrell Lines of New York) on 1 March 1948 and then sold to the line on 22 December 1948 and renamed African Endeavor. On 22 September 1960 title to African Endeavor was returned to the Maritime Administration as a trade in and she entered the reserve fleet in the James River on 26 October. On 9 April 1969 the ship was sold to Boston Metals for scrapping and delivered to the company on 1 May. She was scrapped in 1972.
