= SS Brazil Victory =

Victory ship of the United States

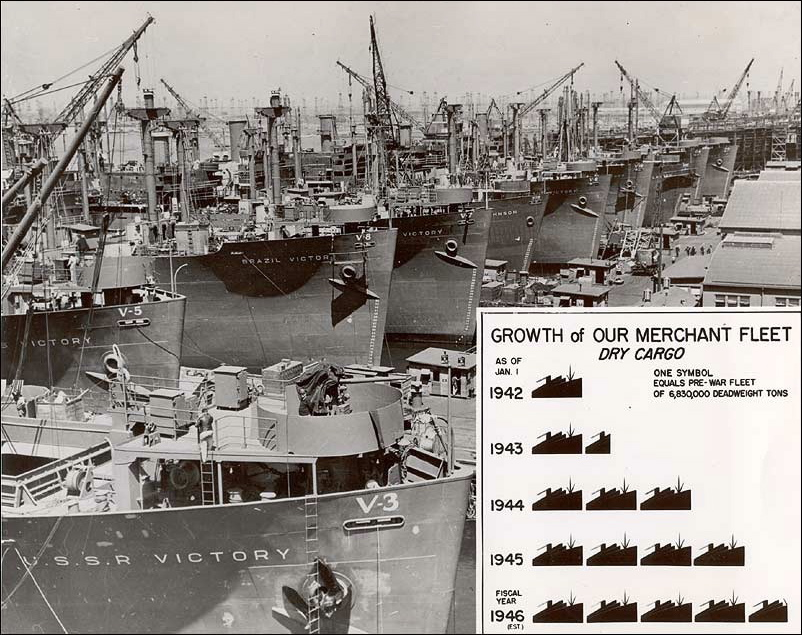
- The Third ship, with V-8 on the hull, is the SS Brazil Victory.

History

United States
- Name: SS Brazil Victory
- Namesake: Brazil
- Owner: War Shipping Administration
- Operator: 1944 Mississippi Shipping Company; 1966 American President Lines
- Builder: California Shipbuilding Company, Los Angeles
- Laid down: February 3, 1944
- Launched: March 30, 1944
- Completed: May 26, 1944
- Identification: IMO number: 5050878
- Fate: Scrapped Huangpu, China 1993

General characteristics
- Class & type: VC2-S-AP3 Victory ship
- Tonnage: 7612 GRT, 4,553 NRT
- Displacement: 15,200 tons
- Length: 455 ft (139 m)
- Beam: 62 ft (19 m)
- Draught: 28 ft (8.5 m)
- Installed power: 8,500 shp (6,300 kW)
- Propulsion: HP & LP turbines geared to a single 20.5-foot (6.2 m) propeller
- Speed: 16.5 knots
- Boats & landing craft carried: 4 Lifeboats
- Complement: 62 Merchant Marine and 28 US Naval Armed Guards
- Armament: 1 × 5 inch (127 mm)/38 caliber gun; 1 × 3 inch (76 mm)/50 caliber gun; 8 × 20 mm Oerlikon

The SS Brazil Victory, United States Maritime Commission designation VC2-S-AP3, hull number 8 (V-8), was the eighth Victory ship built during World War II. Built in 113 days under the Emergency Shipbuilding program, the ship was launched by the California Shipbuilding Company on March 30, 1944, and completed on May 26, 1944. SS Brazil Victory served in the Pacific Ocean, the Indian Ocean, and the Atlantic Ocean during World War II. She was named for the nation of Brazil, one of the Allies of World War II.

== World War II ==
Brazil Victory was operated by Mississippi Shipping Company under charter with the Maritime Commission and War Shipping Administration. SS Brazil Victory served as both an ammunition ship and a cargo ship during World War II. After the inauguration of the SS Brazil Victory, she was launched into the waters of the Cerritos channel, and sailed to and was crewed at San Francisco. She was then loaded with ammunition at Long Beach, California, and from there steamed to Melbourne, Australia to unload cargo destined for the Pacific War. From Australia, she steamed to Calcutta, India, where she was loaded with cocoa beans and latex rubber. She then steamed south of South Africa around the Cape of Good Hope into the Atlantic Ocean, completing her circumnavigation of the world with her arrival in Philadelphia on October 19, 1945. She was retired in 1948 to the National Defense Reserve Fleet at Beaumont, Texas until she was put back in service in 1950.

Typical Victory Ship

== Korean War ==
SS Brazil Victory, commanded by Captain Charles Brown, served as a merchant marine naval ship in the Korean War. She was one of many merchant marine ships, which transported about 75 percent of personnel and about 91.12 percent of the cargo to Korea. SS Brazil Victory made the trip between November 18, 1950, and December 23, 1952, transporting goods, mail, food and other supplies to American forces engaged against Communist forces in Korea, via Busan and other ports in South Korea. After her service, she was kept in the National Defense Reserve Fleet at Suisun Bay until 1966.

== Vietnam War and end of service ==
In 1966, SS Brazil Victory was once again removed from the Reserve Fleet, reactivated, and put into operation by American President Lines. She transported cargo and a small number of troops for the Vietnam War. In 1973, she was retired to the Reserve Fleet at Suisun Bay, and in 1993, she was scrapped in Huangpu, China.

== See also ==
- List of Victory ships
- Liberty ship, the class of ships which Victory-class replaced.
- Type C1 ship
- Type C2 ship
- Type C3 ship

== Sources ==
- Sawyer, L.A. and W.H. Mitchell. Victory ships and tankers: The history of the ‘Victory’ type cargo ships and of the tankers built in the United States of America during World War II, Cornell Maritime Press, 1974, 0-87033-182-5.
- United States Maritime Commission:
- Victory Cargo Ships
