= Archibald Johnston (Bethlehem) =

American businessman (1864–1948)

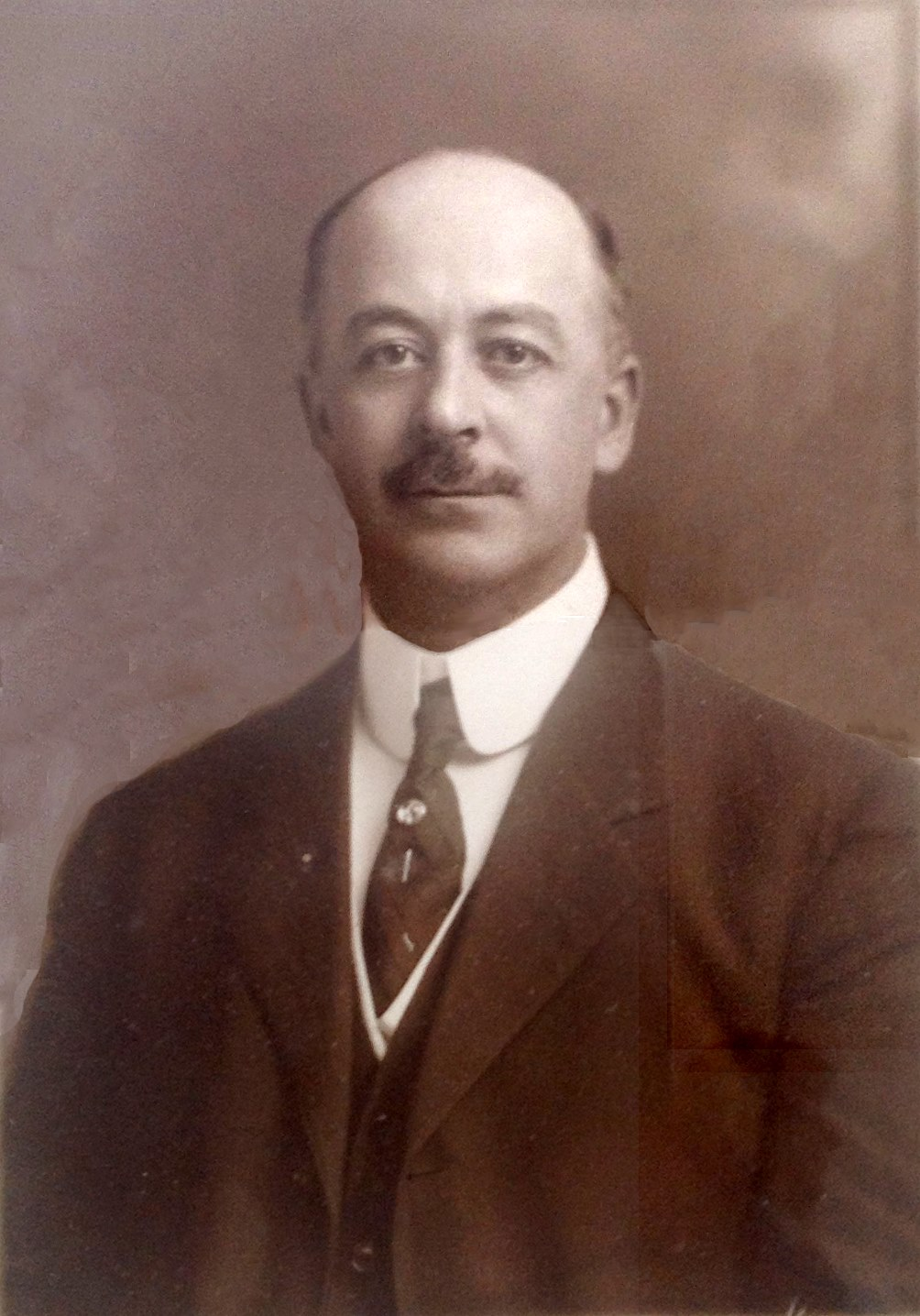
- Johnston in the 1910s

1st Mayor of Bethlehem, Pennsylvania
- In office 1918–1922
- Preceded by: Office established
- Succeeded by: James Yeakel

Personal details
- Born: Archibald Johnston; May 30, 1864 Phoenixville, Pennsylvania, U.S.
- Died: February 1, 1948 (aged 83) Bethlehem Township, Pennsylvania, U.S.
- Political party: Republican
- Spouse: Estelle Sophia Borhek Johnston (1867–1952) (m. 1891)
- Children: 2
- Occupation: Mechanical engineer; business executive; civic leader

Archibald Johnston (May 30, 1864 – February 1, 1948) was a mechanical engineer who, favored by Bethlehem Iron Company management and senior Bethlehem Steel Company president Charles M. Schwab, became president of Bethlehem Steel Company. He was subsequently appointed as first vice president of the Bethlehem Steel Corporation in charge of foreign sales. While first vice president, he led a municipal consolidation campaign to create the modern city of Bethlehem, Pennsylvania, from the boroughs of Bethlehem and South Bethlehem.

As the first mayor of the newly incorporated city, he presided over the construction of the Hill to Hill Bridge as chairman of the Bethlehem Bridge Commission, significantly enlarged the city's area, extended paved streets, water mains, and municipal sewerage, and provided the city's first municipal park.

After leaving office, he returned to Bethlehem Steel and moved his family to nearby Bethlehem Township, to a new property, "Camel's Hump Farm", formed from over 390 acres of land purchased beginning in 1919 from local farmers. Upon his retirement from Bethlehem Steel in 1927, he began describing himself as a "gentleman farmer" and continued in public service until his death at his home in 1948.

== Early life and education ==
Archibald Johnston was born in Phoenixville, Pennsylvania, on May 30, 1864, to Joseph and Martha (née Stroman) Johnston. Joseph Johnston was employed by the Bethlehem Iron Company, one of the predecessor firms to the Bethlehem Steel Corporation. Archibald was one of 10 children.

Johnston attended Bethlehem, Pennsylvania's schools and received a high school diploma at age 15. After working at the Bethlehem Iron Company, he studied mechanical engineering at Lehigh University and received his bachelor's degree in mechanical engineering in 1889. While at Lehigh, he played football and became team captain.

== Family life ==
Johnston married Estelle Sophia Stadiger Borhek (1867–1952), daughter of Ashton C. and Louisa Borhek, on February 12, 1891. Reverend Morris W. Evert of Bethlehem's Central Moravian Church officiated at the ceremony. They had two children, Archibald Borhek Johnston, (known as “Archibald Junior”), in 1894 and Elizabeth Johnston, born in 1899.

Unlike Johnston, Estelle was a native of Bethlehem. Her father, Ashton Borhek, was a co-founder of a lumber and building material company, the Brown Borhek Company, with locations in Bethlehem on the south and north sides of the Lehigh River. Estelle was educated at Linden Hall Seminary in Lititz, Pennsylvania.

Estelle was active in the life of Bethlehem's Central Moravian Church, where she was a member of the Twenty Minute Society and Opportunity Circle. According to her obituary, she maintained a lifetime interest in Moravian College's Helen Stadiger Borhek Chapel, given by her parents in honor of her sister, who died in childhood.

Estelle died on November 17, 1952, at the family's home, Camel's Hump Farm, in Bethlehem Township, Pennsylvania. Her death followed four years of ill health beginning with Johnston's death in 1948.

The Bethlehem Globe-Times obituary of November 18, 1952, noted that she traveled extensively to international destinations with Johnston.

A short video with a reading of her last diary entry of 1947 (32 days before Archibald's death) and her own funeral record of 1952 from the records of Central Moravian Church, "December 31, 1947", is available to view on YouTube.

== Bethlehem Steel ==
Johnston's career at Bethlehem Iron Company began on his graduation from high school in 1879. He was first employed as a machinist apprentice, spending four and a half years in that position before moving to the finishing department. His career at Bethlehem Iron Company paused during his studies at Lehigh University. After receiving his bachelor's degree, Johnston returned to the Bethlehem Iron Company's physical laboratory. By age 25, Johnston was responsible for the erection of John Fritz-designed 125-ton hammer used in the manufacture of armor plates for ships.

Johnston became a protégé of Charles M. Schwab after his return to the Bethlehem Iron Company. In 1901, Schwab appointed Johnston general superintendent of the plant.

During Johnston's career with Bethlehem Iron Company and its successor organizations, the Bethlehem Steel Company and the Bethlehem Steel Corporation, he served at various times as corporate president and vice president. Johnston's responsibility extended to overseas sales of the company's products. He traveled internationally for most of his career, representing the corporation's products to governments and private companies and executing contracts for steel products throughout Europe and Asia.

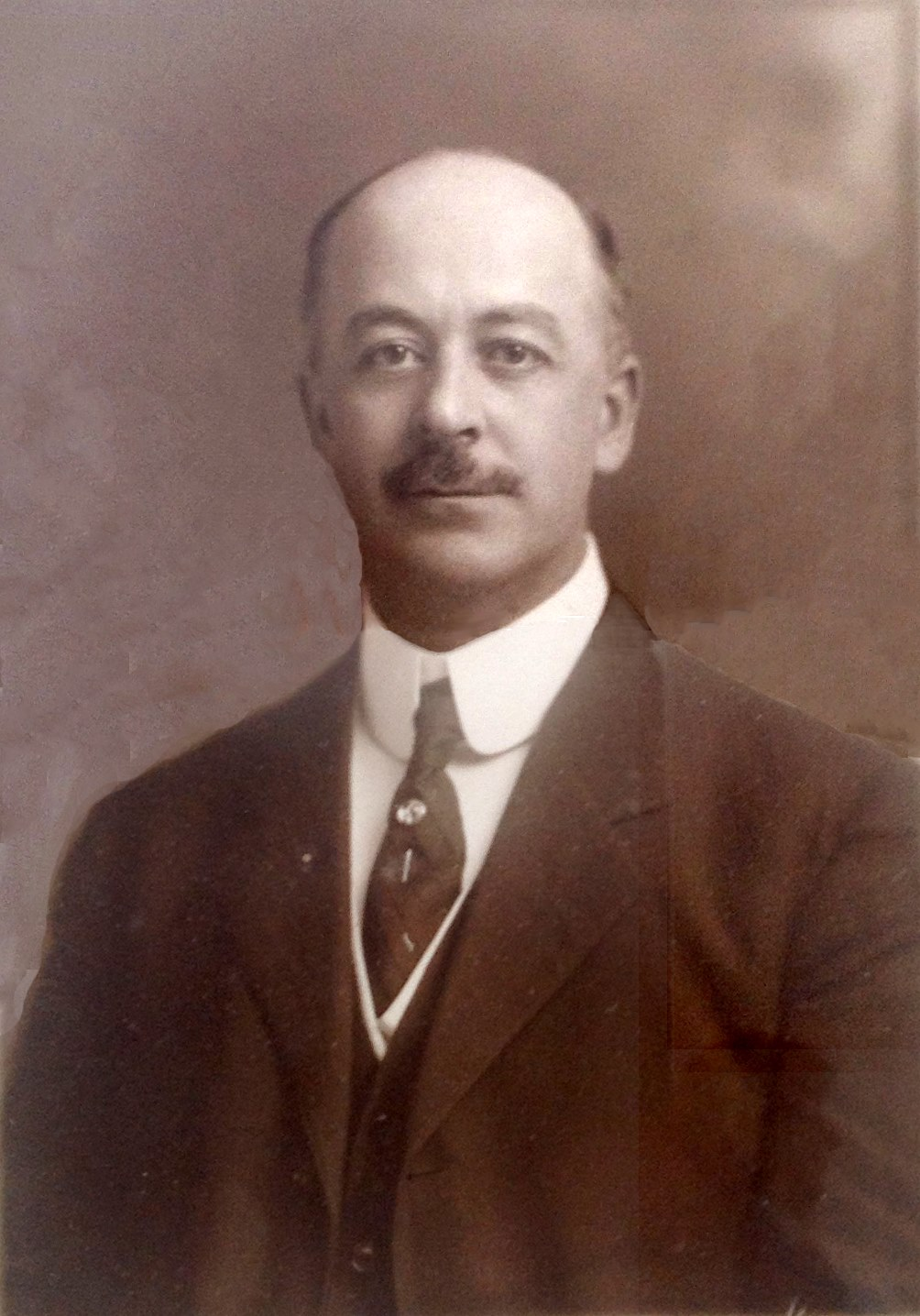
Photographic portrait of Archibald Johnston, first mayor of incorporated city of Bethlehem, Pennsylvania. Photograph taken in 1910s. Johnston was first vice president of Bethlehem Steel Corporation after a term as president of Bethlehem Steel Company.

A 1918 book entitled "Men of Bethlehem" published by Fred L. Shankweiler describes Johnston as having

"entered the employ of the Bethlehem Steel Company, physical testing department, in 1889 and later was in charge of the erection and operation of the gun forging plant, the first to be established in America. He later took charge of the erection and was superintendent of the armor plate department, also the first to be built in America. In the present world war the plant of the Bethlehem Steel Company is the government’s best asset. He was successively assistant general superintendent, general superintendent and since October, 1908, vice-president of the Bethlehem Steel Company; first vice-president of the Bethlehem Steel Corporation; second vice-president Juragua Iron Company; vice-president Bethlehem Steel Products Company; Bethlehem Iron Mines Company."

Johnston retired from the Bethlehem Steel Corporation in 1927, and remained a member of the board of his directors until his death in 1948.

== Civic leadership ==
Johnston, with support from Bethlehem Steel Corporation, was an advocate of the consolidation of the boroughs of Bethlehem, South Bethlehem, and Northampton Heights, and in 1917, after a successful consolidation election, the boroughs were merged into the modern city of Bethlehem. He served as mayor for one four-year term from 1917 to 1921 as a Republican.

During his period as mayor, a commission to construct a bridge to replace a covered bridge across the Lehigh River was formed. Johnston was chairman of the commission, and in 1921, a three-year construction project began on what was to become the Hill to Hill Bridge. The bridge became the physical manifestation of the unification of the two boroughs and remains the primary traffic artery between the northern and southern portions of the city.

Johnston also had a leadership role in the Wild Creek Project, a system of reservoirs and aqueducts bringing water from Penn Forest Township in Carbon County to new distribution reservoirs in Bethlehem and Fountain Hill. The project, in part replacing the Monocacy Creek along the banks of the Monocacy Creek on Bethlehem's north side, was completed before the United States's entry into World War II.

Johnston was the president of the Central Moravian Congregation (Central Moravian Church), a trustee of Moravian College, and sat on local corporate and non-profit boards of directors. In 1958, Moravian College named its field house “Archibald Johnston Hall” in recognition of his service to the institution.

== Later life ==
In the middle of the 19th century, Northampton County was primarily agricultural, settled by Moravians and Pennsylvania Germans.

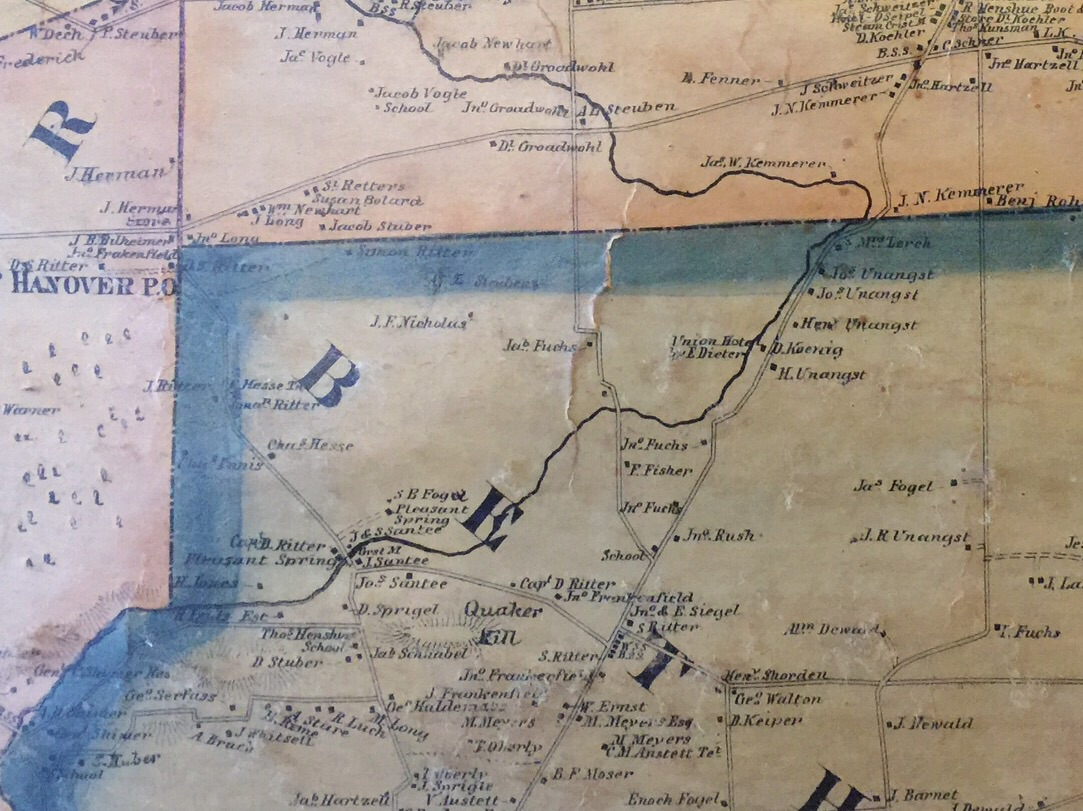
Detail of portions of Bethlehem and Lower Nazareth Townships in Northampton County, Pennsylvania

The Monocacy Creek ran north from its confluence with the Lehigh River in the then-borough of Bethlehem to multiple headwaters in the central part of the county. Along this creek were "Pine Top Hill" and "Quaker Hill".

Johnston began acquiring land in the northern portion of the city of Bethlehem and Bethlehem Township in 1919 in order to construct a home for his family. The parcels he purchased extended north from the crest of “Quaker Hill”, which he subsequently renamed “Camel’s Hump” (or "Camels Hump") after the shape of the two small peaks. The joined properties he acquired became known as “Camel’s Hump Farm”, and, by the 1930s, included over 900 acres (360 hectares). Construction on the Curtis Lovelace-designed home began in 1921. The general contractor, including masonry and carpentry, was F.F. Speck Construction Company of Walnut Street. The painting contract was let to Frank Mitman of West Broad Street, and brick and stucco work to Morris Brewer of Broadway. The construction cost was $65,000. The family occupied it in 1923.

The three-story, 22-room, 6,000-square-foot (557 m sq) Adam-style Colonial Revival mansion was situated on a bluff over the Monocacy Creek. Bethlehem Steel beams were used in the construction of the building and, based on earlier experiences with house fires, the building had a fire suppression system throughout all three floors.

Johnston used his engineering skills to landscape and hardscape the grounds of the estate. Steel beams were used in structures throughout the main property. He also planned a system of paved roads and horse trails throughout the grounds. He constructed bridges and rerouted and walled portions of Monocacy Creek.

Johnston died at the family home on February 1, 1948.

== Camel's Hump Farm ==
Based on a map commissioned by Archibald Johnston in 1929 and printed privately for his family in December of that year, the family's property comprised over 500 acres (202 hectares). The approximate northern border follows Pennsylvania US Route 22 from Township Line Road to its junction with Pennsylvania Route 191/Nazareth Pike. The eastern border was Nazareth Pike/Linden Street. The southern border followed the ridge of Camel's Hump from Linden Street to Altonah Road. The western border was Altonah Road and Township Line Road. The majority of the property was in Bethlehem Township (Northampton County), with the southern portion within the Bethlehem city limits.

The property had a system of paved roads and bridges connecting the residences, outbuildings, and features. One road left Santee Mill Road just east of the mill, roughly following Monocacy Creek. On the east side, it forked, with the southern branch leading to the "Blue House" residence, another residence, and the swimming pool complex and bathhouse. The northern branch continued along Monocacy Creek past the boat house to the spring and pump house, where it switched back and climbed the hill to the formal garden. Another branch of this road carried visitors from the boat house up a serpentine drive to the front entrance of the mansion, situated on a rise approximately 60 feet above the creek.

The 1929 map shows a boulevarded road leaving Christian Spring Road on the east, carrying other traffic from the city of Bethlehem on the more heavily used Linden Street. The entry continued to the rear of the mansion through an orchard and connected with the road from Santee Mill on the north side of the mansion at the stone steps.

=== Major areas of the Camel's Hump Farm estate in 1929 ===
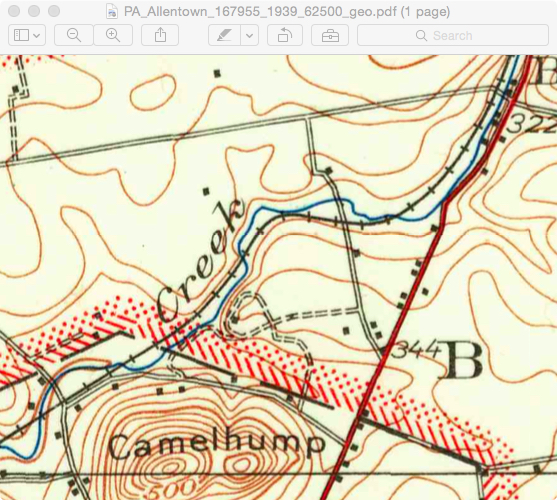
Section of Allentown (Pennsylvania) USGS topo map from 1939

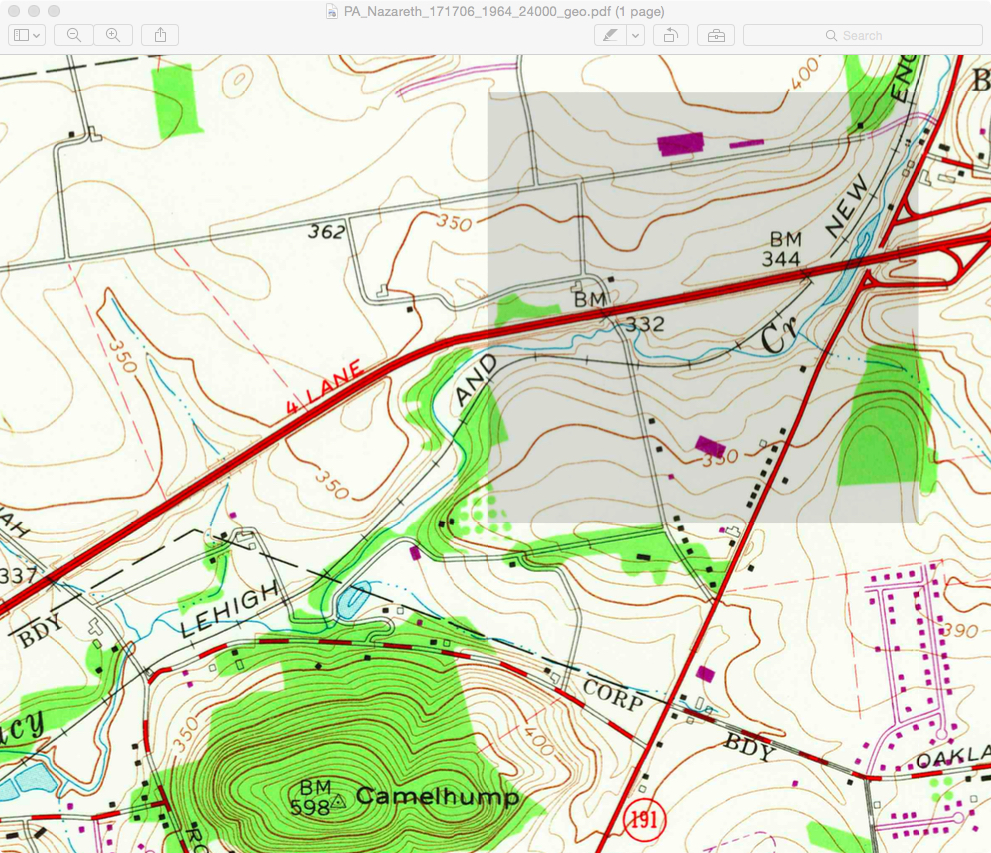
Section of Nazareth (Pennsylvania) USGS topo map from 1964

==== Bethlehem Township portion ====
- North Farm, Northampton County parcel ID M6 4 1 0204, M6 4 2 0204, M6 4 5A 0205, M6 4 5A 0204
- Spring (on Monocacy Creek)
- Pump house (on Monocacy Creek)
- Boat house (east bank of Monocacy Creek)
- Boat launch (east bank of Monocacy Creek)
- Tennis court (adjacent to Monocacy Creek)
- Lime kilns
- Stone steps from the mansion to the boat house and creek

==== City of Bethlehem portion ====
- East Farm (dated 1828 on map), Northampton County parcel ID M6 8 1D 0205
- Swimming pool complex
- Kingsley residence, Northampton County parcel ID M6 18 1 0204
- West Farm
- The "Old Orchard"
- Santee Mill (dated 1719 on map)

=== Residences on the Camel's Hump Farm property ===
==== Bethlehem Township portion ====
- Residence of Archibald Johnston and Estelle Borhek Johnston, Northampton County parcel ID M7 7 2 0205E
- Residence of Archibald Johnston Jr. (son) and Jean Hale Johnston, Northampton County parcel ID M7 7 1 0205
- Gardener's house
- Residence of George P. and Elizabeth Margaret Johnston (daughter) Kingsley
- North Farm farm house, Northampton County parcel ID M6 4 3 0204

==== City of Bethlehem portion ====
- Santee Farm house
- Farmhouse on West Farm (designated on map as "the scene of the crime"), Northampton County parcel ID M6 18 1 0204

== Housenick Park and the Archibald Johnston Conservation Area ==
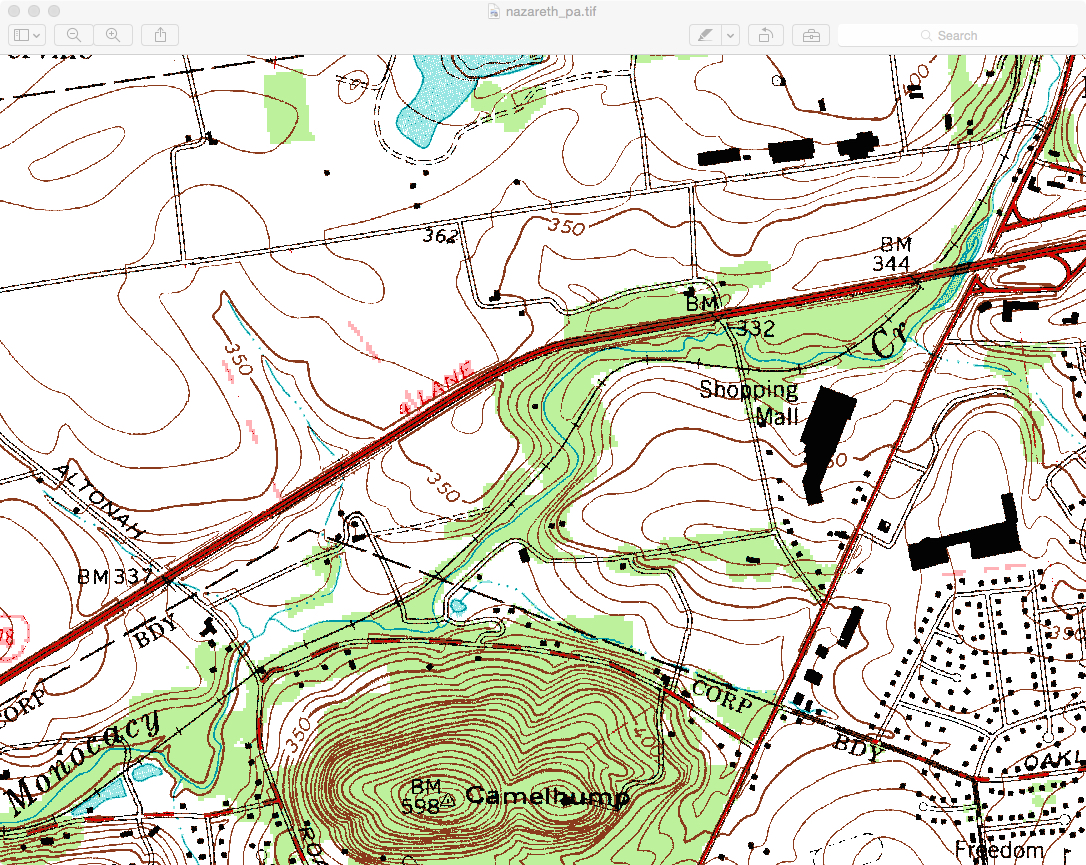
Portion of Nazareth, Pennsylvania USGS topo map from 2001

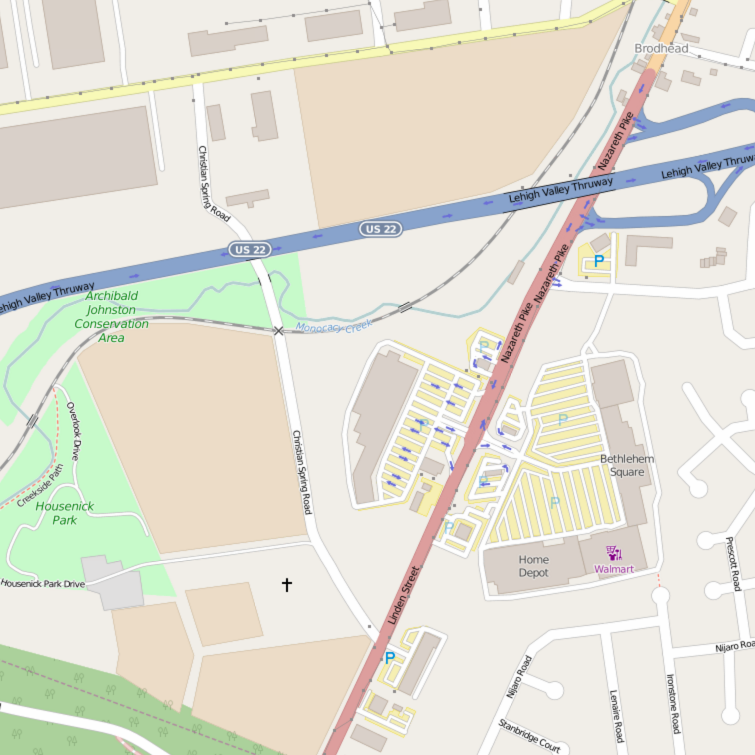
Location of Housenick Park in Bethlehem Township, Pennsylvania

Janet Johnston Housenick (daughter of Archibald Borhek Johnston, granddaughter of Archibald Johnston, and widow of William D. Housenick, a Bethlehem Area School district teacher) died at her home on August 2, 2005. She left her Bethlehem Township property, consisting of 55 acres (22.3 hectares) comprising the Archibald Johnston mansion and the grounds surrounding it (noted as parcel numbers M7 7 2 0205E, which includes the majority of the property, and M7 7 2B 0205, a smaller residence parcel), to Bethlehem Township for use as a public park. Accompanying the gift of the property was an instruction to establish a charitable trust named the "Janet Johnston Housenick and William D. Housenick Memorial Foundation". The foundation was vested with approximately $2 million (US) and the foundation's purpose was to "promote, protect, preserve, conserve, maintain and enhance" the property in conjunction with an earlier gift of parcel M7 7 2A PKB 0205C in 1986 to Northampton County of adjoining land along Monocacy Creek. Today, the park and the conservation area are commonly known as "Housenick Park".

In the will, Housenick's wish was "that the two (2) parks appear to the public as a single entity open to the public for enjoyment of the natural beauty of these park lands, even though ownership of the two (2) parks may rest with different government agencies." In subsequent years, a study was done by Pennoni Associates of the Housenick property gift, and in 2013 trail markers and information kiosks were erected. The trail markers were paid for by funds from the foundation. Information about the Bethlehem Township park system is available at the township's parks and recreation website.

The properties comprising the historic estate are notable birdwatching areas, and birds spotted in the Monocacy Creek watershed area are tracked by the Lehigh Valley Audubon Society as well as local colleges. The geology and hydrology connects the historic Johnston properties to other notable birdwatching areas such as Green Pond Marsh, a Audubon Pennsylvania-designated "Important Bird Area", approximately 3.4 miles (5.5 km) to the east.

On October 17, 2014, Natural Lands Trust learned that they were awarded the second of two open space grants from the Commonwealth of Pennsylvania to purchase two parcels owned by Bethlehem's Central Moravian Church. The parcels, M7 7 1 0205 (31 acres/12.5 hectares) and M6 8 1D 0205 (18.34 acres/7.4 hectares) are contiguous with the parcels currently owned by Bethlehem Township and Northampton County.

An additional parcel on Santee Mill Road listed as M6 8 1 0204, the home of William and Amanda ("Johnnie") (Johnston) Leckonby until her death on November 19, 2011, was sold to the Friends of Johnston in March 2015. The group, a nonprofit 501(c)(3) organization, is "committed to the preservation, restoration and sustainable adaptive reuse of the estate of the first Mayor of Bethlehem, Archibald Johnston, to meet the needs of [the] community." The 3.26-acre (1.32 hectare) parcel consists of the Leckonby family home, the "East Farm" barn built in the Pennsylvania bank barn style, two additional outbuildings, and a swimming pool. The parcel is bisected by the Bethlehem-Bethlehem Township municipal border and contains a small stream running from east to west toward the Monocacy Creek.
