= USNS Aiken Victory =

United States Navy cargo ship

History

United States
- Name: USNS Aiken Victory (T-AP-188)
- Namesake: Aiken, South Carolina
- Owner: War Shipping Administration
- Operator: Mississippi Shipping Company, then US Navy
- Builder: Bethlehem Steel, Fairfield yard
- Laid down: 13 October 1944
- Launched: 30 November 1944
- Sponsored by: Mrs E. H. Wyman
- Acquired: (By the Navy): 21 July 1950
- In service: Commercial: 1945–1948; MSTS: 21 July 1950 – December 1952
- Stricken: 12 February 1953
- Identification: MC hull type VC2-S-AP2, MC hull no. 616
- Honors and awards: Eight battle stars for Korean War service
- Fate: Sold for scrap, 10 August 1971

General characteristics
- Displacement: 4,480 tons (lt), 10,680 t. (fl)
- Length: 455 ft
- Beam: 62 ft
- Draft: 29 ft 2 in
- Propulsion: Cross compound steam turbine, single screw, 8,500 shp
- Speed: 15.5 knots
- Armament: 1 × 5 inch (127 mm)/38 caliber gun; 1 × 3 inch (76 mm)/50 caliber gun; 8 × 20 mm Oerlikon

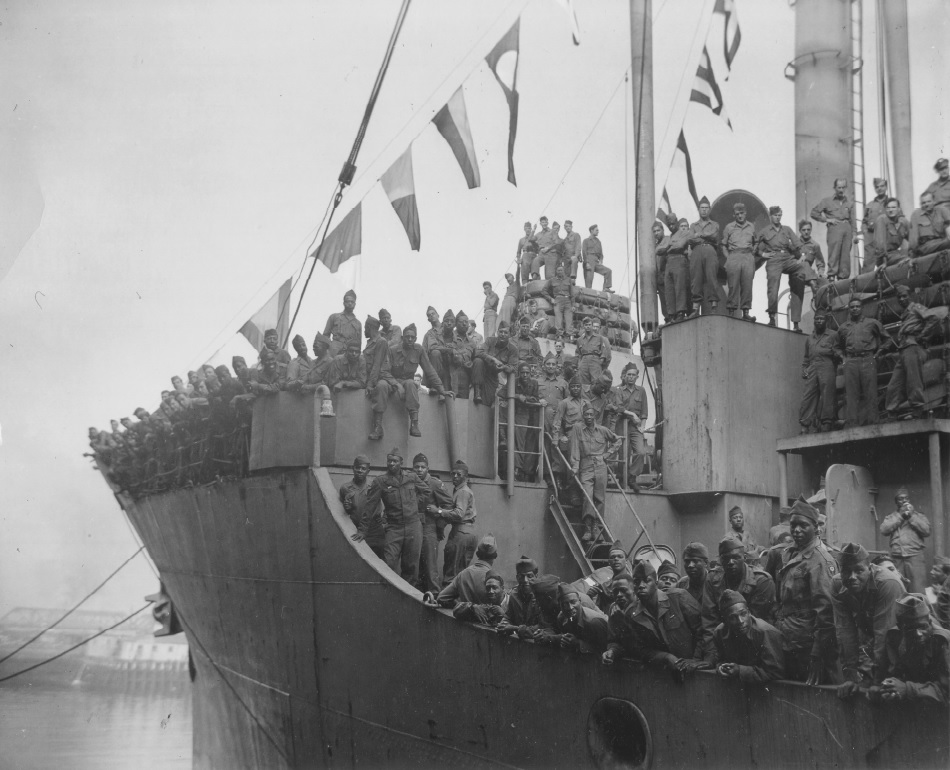
The Aiken Victory arriving in Boston with 1,958 troops from Europe, 26 July 1945

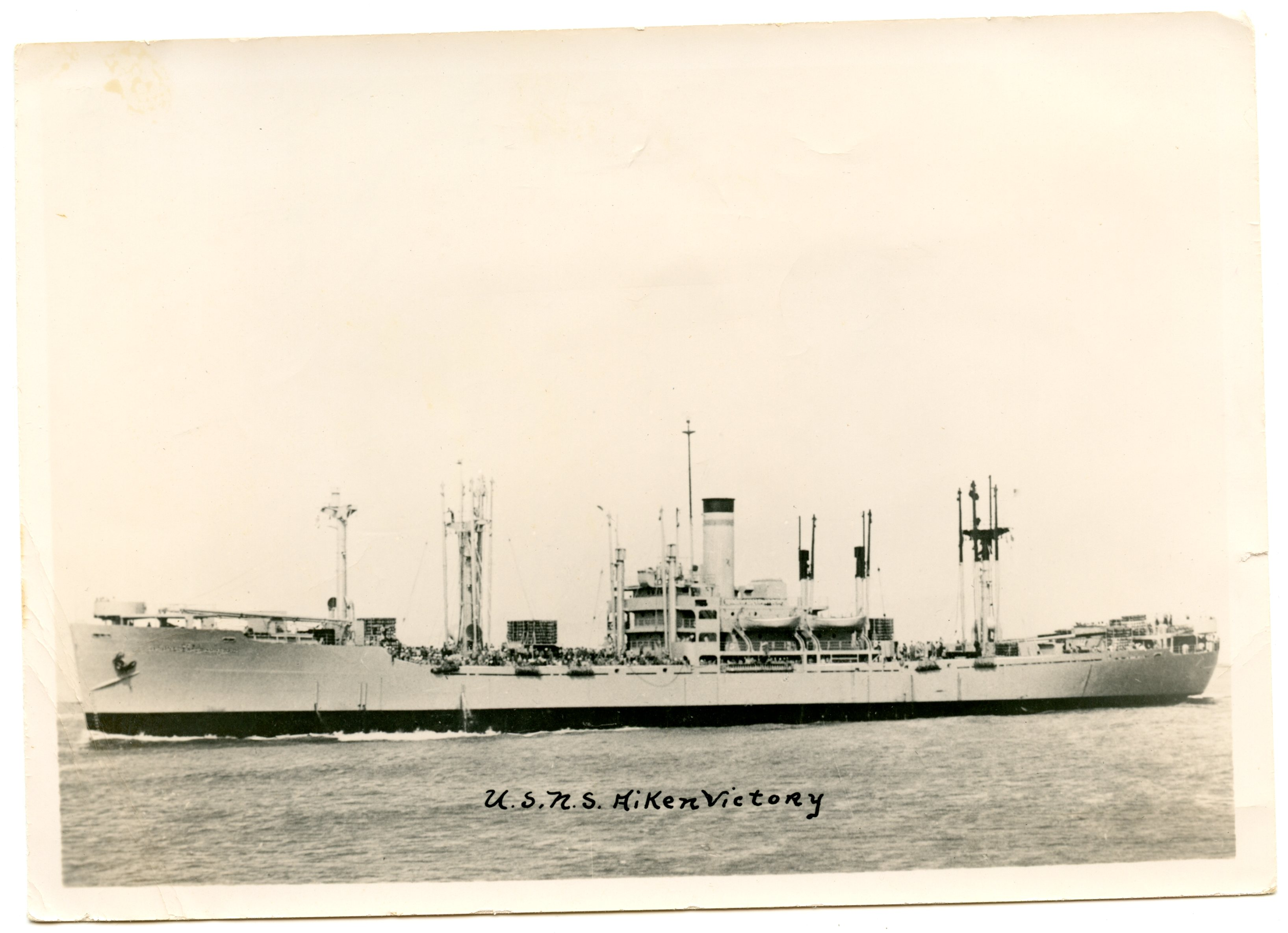
USNS Aiken Victory taken sometime between 1951 and 1952

USNS Aiken Victory (T-AP-188) was a Victory ship-based troop transport that served with the United States Army Transport Service during both World War II and the Korean War. She was one of a class of 84 dedicated troop transports.

She was laid down as a VC2-S-AP2 hull, no. 616 on 13 October 1944 at Baltimore, Maryland, by the Bethlehem-Fairfield Shipyard, Inc., under a Maritime Commission contract (MCV hull 616); launched on 30 November 1944; and delivered to the Maritime Commission on 30 December 1944. She was operated under Maritime Commission contract by Mississippi Shipping Company. She was put in the reserve fleet in Suisun Bay on February 22, 1947.

She was reactivated on July 21, 1950, to join the Military Sea Transportation Service (MSTS) during the Korean War. She was returned to the reserve fleet on December 19, 1952, and remained there until allocated for scrapping to American Ship Dismantlers, Inc., on August 10, 1971, and physically delivered August 26.

== World War II ==
During World War II, Aiken Victory was operated by the firm Mississippi Shipping company, under a contract with the United States Maritime Commission. Aiken Victory delivered cargo to support the war efforts in the Asiatic-Pacific Theater of war. She also transported small groups of troops in the Pacific War. She was part of Convoy CU 63 that departed New York on March 23–1945, arriving at Liverpool, England on 3 April 1945. Aiken Victory was part of Operation Magic Carpet bring troops home form both Pacific and European Theater.

Following the end of hostilities, that company continued to operate her under contract until she was put in the National Defense Reserve Fleet in Suisun Bay on February 22, 1947.

== MSTS service – Korean War ==
The United States Navy acquired the ship on 21 July 1950 in the wake of the outbreak the Korean War the previous month. Designated T-AP-188, the ship was assigned to the Military Sea Transportation Service as a troopship transport. In May 1951, she transported the Colombia Battalion to Korea, with a stop-over in Hawaii.

Operated by a civil service crew, USNS Aiken Victory carried troops in the Korean War combat zone for almost 30 months. She earned eight battle stars for transporting troops in combat zones during the 30 months of service. Late in 1952 the she was returned to the United States and was transferred back to the Maritime Commission on 19 December 1952. She was berthed with the National Defense Reserve Fleet at Olympia, Washington. Her name was struck from the Navy list on 12 February 1953. She remained with the National Defense Reserve Fleet until 10 August 1971 at which time she was sold to American Ship Dismantlers, Inc., for scrapping. In 1971 she was scrapped in Portland, Oregon.

== Awards ==
Aiken Victory received eight battle stars for her Korean War service. Aiken Victory also earned the National Defense Service Medal, Korean Service Medal, United Nations Service Medal and the Republic of Korea War Service Medal-(retroactive).
