= Housenick Park =

Coordinates: 40.6726060°N 75.3517790°W

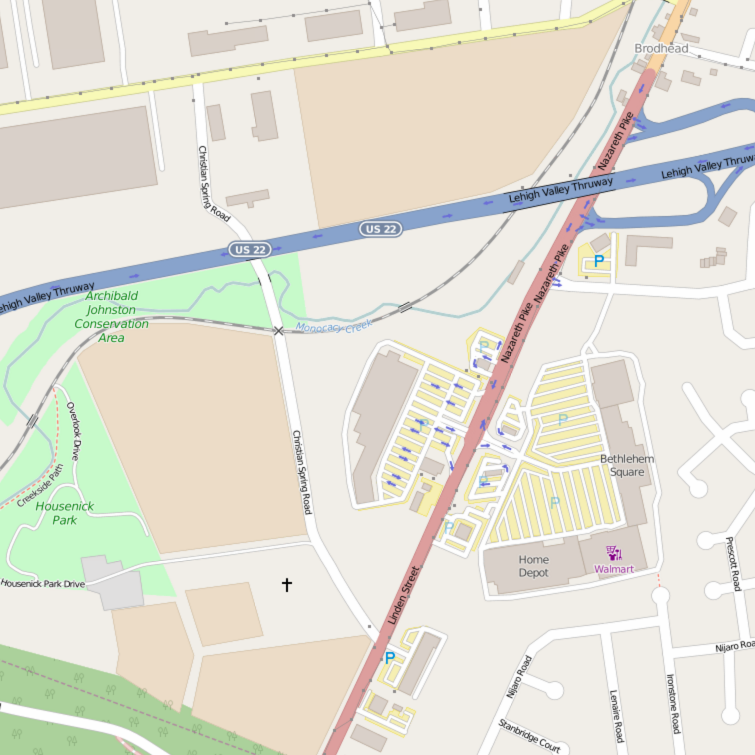
Location of Housenick Park in Bethlehem Township, Pennsylvania

Housenick Park is the popular name for a passive park located in Bethlehem Township, Pennsylvania. The 55 acre/22.3 hectare Janet Johnston Housenick and William D. Housenick Memorial Park of Bethlehem Township and the 36 acre/14.6 hectare Archibald Johnston Conservation Area of Northampton County comprise the park. The two parcels were gifts of Janet Johnston Housenick, the great-granddaughter of Archibald Johnston, the first mayor of the consolidated city of Bethlehem.

== Location ==
Housenick Park is located in the northwestern part of Bethlehem Township along the Monocacy Creek (a tributary of the Lehigh River). Automobile, bicycle, and pedestrian access to the park is from Nazareth Pike and Christian Spring Road in Bethlehem Township. An unmarked lane opening to the west from Christian Spring Road leads to the park's parking area. An interpretive kiosk contains a map and information on the park.

Adjoining the park but not part of it are two former Johnston-family properties. to the left of the entrance drive was the home of Johnston's son, Archibald Borhek Johnston and later the home of his daughter, Elizabeth Johnston Prime. Elizabeth Prime left her home and surrounding land to Bethlehem's Central Moravian Church on her death on May 25, 2006. The home and surrounding land was sold by the church and it is now a private residence.

Another property was the home of another of Archibald Borhek Johnston's daughters, Amanda Johnston Leckonby ("Johnnie"). The 1836 Adam Geringer farmstead (Pennsylvania bank barn and farmhouse with outbuildings) was sold by Leckonby's estate to the Friends of Johnston, a 501(c)3 organization dedicated to preservation and adaptive reuse of the property, in 2015. The property was renamed "Camel's Hump Farm on the Johnston Estate". This property will eventually be connected by trail to Housenick Park.

== History ==
The two parcels of Housenick Park are the core of what was at one time an almost one square mile (2.5 km sq) property assembled in the late 1910s and early 1920s by Archibald Johnston. Johnston acquired the properties during and immediately after his four-year term as mayor of the newly-consolidated city of Bethlehem. He named his property "Camel's Hump Farms" after the geographical feature, Camelhump (as used on US Geological Survey maps) or Camel's Hump (earlier "Quaker Hill").

Johnston and his wife Estelle Borhek Johnston lived in the 6,000 square-foot (557 m sq) "big house" until his death in 1948 and her death in 1952. Johnston and Estelle died at home; Estelle's funeral was conducted at the home two days after her November 17, 1952 death.

== Park amenities ==
Housenick Park, a passive recreation area, does not have playing fields or recreation equipment. Instead, paths lead through the park and the adjoining Archibald Johnston Conservation Area along private roads laid out by Johnston in the 1920s.

The current trails lead from the parking lot to the Archibald Johnston Mansion (referred to as the "big house"), then along the Monocacy Creek to the south to the bird blind and cement bridge. Another trail along the Monocacy goes north to the spring and pump house. A third trail goes directly from the spring and pump house area back to the parking lot. Two interpretive kiosks (parking lot and at north end of park at abandoned railroad crossing) provide information about notable features. Trash containers are located at the parking area.

A new parking lot under construction during the summer of 2015 will open in the fall, and will accommodate 20 to 30 cars. The existing interpretive kiosk will be moved to the new parking area.

Drinking water is not available at the park. A porta potty is provided by Bethlehem Township.
