= USS Thurston =

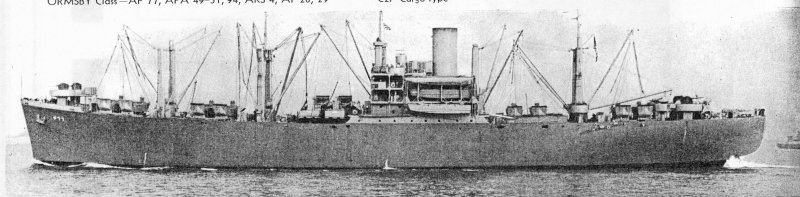
- USS Thurston (AP-77) underway, 23 September 1942, location unknown

History

United States
- Name: USS Thurston
- Namesake: Thurston County, Nebraska; Thurston County, Washington
- Builder: Federal Shipbuilding & Drydock
- Laid down: 9 December 1941
- Launched: 4 April 1942
- Sponsored by: Mrs Dorothy W. Necht
- Christened: SS Delsantos
- Completed: 11 July 1942
- Acquired: 13 September 1942
- Commissioned: 19 September 1942
- Decommissioned: 1 August 1946
- Renamed: USS Dauphin, USS Thurston, SS Chickasaw
- Stricken: 28 August 1946
- Identification: MC hull type C2-F, MC hull no. 134
- Honors and awards: Seven battle stars for World War II service
- Fate: Lost after running aground, 7 February 1962

General characteristics
- Type: Type C2-F ship
- Displacement: 5,185 tons (lt) 13,898 t. (fl)
- Length: 459 ft 3 in
- Beam: 63 ft
- Draft: 23 ft
- Propulsion: Steam turbine, single shaft, 6,000 hp
- Speed: 16.5 knots
- Troops: 1,306
- Complement: 456
- Armament: 4 x 3"/50 caliber dp guns, 4 x 40mm guns

USS Thurston (AP-77) was a troop transport that served with the United States Navy during World War II. She was named after counties in Nebraska and Washington.

Thurston was laid down under Maritime Commission contract (MC hull 134) as SS Delsantos (sometimes styled as Del Santos) on 9 December 1941 at Kearney, New Jersey, by the Federal Shipbuilding & Drydock Company, for the Mississippi Shipping Company; launched on 4 April 1942; and delivered on 11 July 1942. The ship was acquired by the Navy from the War Shipping Administration under a bare boat charter on 13 September 1942 and was renamed Dauphin and designated AP-77 on 16 September. However, to avoid confusion with a Canadian ship, HMCS Dauphin, the ship was again renamed on 18 September, this time as Thurston.

== World War II ==
Commissioned on 19 September 1942, Thurston was converted into an auxiliary transport by the Atlantic Basin Iron Works of Brooklyn, New York, and was ready for sea on the 24th.

=== Operation Torch ===
Following shakedown training out of Little Creek, Virginia, and landing exercises with Army units at Solomons Island, Maryland, the transport sortied on 24 October with Task Group (TG) 34.9, the Center Attack Force, for the invasion of North Africa. Her holds and decks were combat-loaded with men and equipment of the 15th Infantry Regiment.

On the morning of 8 November, she arrived in the transport area off Fedhala, French Morocco. Since her troops were assigned to the reserve force, she did not begin disembarking them until late that evening. On the 13th, Thurston entered Casablanca harbor to finish unloading supplies and equipment. She began her return voyage on the 15th and arrived at Hampton Roads 11 days later. Two round-trip voyages across the Atlantic carrying reinforcements to North Africa were next on her agenda. She then spent March and April undergoing repairs and alterations.

=== Operation Husky ===
On 10 May, the ship sailed with convoy UGF-8A for Oran with troops to be used in the Operation Husky, the invasion of Sicily. In early June, Thurston embarked units of the 16th Infantry Regiment and headed to Algiers for landing rehearsals. On 6 July, she sortied with Task force (TF) 81 and, on the 9th, arrived in the assault area off Gela. The ship landed the troops early the next morning, completed unloading on the 12th, and returned via Algiers to Oran. On 22 July, she headed to New York City for more troops and supplies and was back at Oran on 2 September. Five days later, she embarked 600 German prisoners of war and disembarked them at New York on the 22nd.

=== Air attack off Algiers ===
On 8 October, the transport—loaded with American troops—joined Convoy UT-3 and debarked them at Gourock, Scotland, on the 17th. She then proceeded to Glasgow to pick up Canadian troops, returned to Gourock, and joined a convoy for North Africa. The convoy arrived off Algiers on 6 November and, that evening, was subjected to an air attack in which destroyer USS Beatty (DD-640), SS Santa Elena, and the Dutch ship SS Mornix van St. Aldegonde were torpedoed and sunk while Allied ships splashed six German planes.

The remainder of the convoy arrived at Naples two days later, and Thurston disembarked the Canadians. She then moved to Palermo to pick up elements of the American 1st Armored Division for passage to Scotland. After a week at Gourock, the transport got underway for the United States on the last day of November and reached New York on 9 December 1943.

=== Operation Overlord ===
Thurston carried troops from New York to Liverpool in January 1944; to Gourock in February; and to Cardiff, Wales, in April. When the ship finished unloading at Cardiff on 4 April, she proceeded to Loch Long for three weeks of landing exercises to prepare for Operation Overlord, the invasion of Hitler's "Fortress Europe." She anchored at Portland, England, on the 29th and sustained minor damage there on 28 May when a German bomb exploded 30 yards off her port side.

In the evening of 5 June, Thurston began the channel crossing to Normandy with Assault Group O-3. At 0333 the next morning, she was anchored about 10 miles (16 km) off Omaha Beach and landed troops of the 116th Infantry Regiment, 29th US Infantry Division, during the second group of assault waves, at 0725. She lost three of her boats in the initial assault wave and two in the 2nd wave. That evening, the transport left the area and returned to Portland the next morning to remain "on-call" until the 19th.

=== Operation Dragoon ===
On 4 July, Thurston got underway and proceeded, via Oran, to Naples with a load of lorries and M4 tanks. After unloading on the 17th, she remained at Naples until 13 August, when—loaded with assault troops—she sortied with the Assault Group of TF 84 (Alpha Force) for Operation Dragoon, the invasion of southern France. She was off Baie de Pampelonne, France, on the morning of the 15th and launched the assault wave, which went ashore with little opposition. The next morning, she got underway for Oran.

Late in September, the transport loaded French troops and landed them at Lardier on the 30th. She then operated in resupply convoys from North Africa and Italy to the beaches until 25 October when she joined a convoy headed to the United States.

=== Transfer to the Pacific ===
The ship arrived at New York on 6 November and began an overhaul that lasted until 19 December. She called at Norfolk, Virginia the next day and got underway for the Pacific on the 21st. She transited the Panama Canal on 27 December 1944 and arrived at San Francisco on 5 January 1945. There, the transport loaded passengers and cargo and headed for Hawaii. She reached Pearl Harbor on the 22nd; debarked the passengers; embarked garrison troops; and proceeded via Eniwetok to the Marianas.

=== Invasion of Iwo Jima ===
The transport was at Saipan from 11 to 16 February, whence she sortied with Transport Group Able of the Attack Force for the assault against Iwo Jima. Thurston remained off the Iwo beaches from 19 to 26 February before she was finally ordered to land her troops. She finished unloading cargo the next day and headed back toward the Marianas. She arrived at Saipan on 2 March, called at Guam the next day to off-load 33 battle casualties, and then proceeded to the Solomons.

=== Invasion of Okinawa ===
Thurston called at Tulagi on the 12th and continued to Espiritu Santo to load elements of the Army's 27th Infantry Division. From there, her itinerary took her via Ulithi, to Okinawa. The ship debarked her troops at the Hagushi Beaches on 9 April and, five days later, headed for the Marianas, whence she was routed, via Ulithi and Manus, to New Caledonia. She embarked 917 homeward-bound passengers and battle casualties at Nouméa on 11 May and debarked them at San Francisco on 26 May.

=== After hostilities ===
Thurston took on Army troops on 9 June and proceeded, via Eniwetok and Ulithi, to the Philippines. She arrived at Manila on 8 July, discharged her troops and cargo there, moved to Tacloban, and embarked homeward-bound naval personnel. The transport called at Ulithi to pick up more sailors and, as the war ended, anchored at San Francisco on 14 August.

On the 25th, the ship began a voyage to the Philippines with more Army troops and arrived at Manila on 15 September. There, the ship was assigned to Operation Magic Carpet duty, returning servicemen home from overseas.

==== Minor postwar engagement ====
Considered the last surface engagement of the World War 2 era of a US Navy ship using its primary deck gun to engage hostile military force at sea.

Thurston was next ordered to the Solomons. On 4 October, while en route to Guadalcanal, she sighted a 28-foot dory, which showed no sign of life. However, a blanket in the forward cockpit aroused suspicion of the deck officer, who sent a landing craft to see if anyone was on board. The LCVP circled the dory at very close range before moving alongside.

As the boat officer stepped aboard the dory, with service 45 cal drawn, three Japanese armed with grenades in both hands emerged from under the blanket and hurled them at the officer and the boat. The Officer did not have the first bullet chambered so the pistol did not fire. The boat officer tumbled overboard and the boat crew abandoned the LCVP over the "off-side" before the grenades exploded. A second LCVP with a fully armed crew was launched to rescue the crew of the first boat. As soon as they were picked up, Thurston opened fire with her machine guns and finally sank the dory with a 3-inch shell. The boat crew suffered no casualties, and the LCVP was recovered.

==== Final transport missions ====
The ship then called at Guadalcanal, Espiritu Santo, New Caledonia, and arrived at Seattle on the 30th. The transport made three more Magic-Carpet voyages: to the Philippines in December 1945 and in March 1946, and to Okinawa and Japan in May. When she arrived at San Francisco on 20 June, she began preparations for inactivation.

== Decommission ==
Thurston was decommissioned and returned to the War Shipping Administration on 1 August 1946 and resumed the name Del Santos. She was struck from the Navy List on 28 August 1946.

== Commercial service ==
Del Santos was sold to the Waterman Steamship Company in 1948. The following year, she was renamed Chickasaw. She remained in merchant service as Chickasaw until 7 February 1962 when she ran aground on Santa Rosa Island off the coast of California.

== Awards ==
Thurston received seven battle stars for her World War II service.
