= USS Pitkin =

Cargo ship of the United States Navy

History

United States
- Name: Coastal Observer (1944–1945, 1945–); Pitkin (1945)
- Namesake: Pitkin County, Colorado
- Ordered: as type (C1-M-AV1) hull, MC hull 2158
- Builder: Globe Shipbuilding Co., Superior, Wisconsin
- Yard number: 125
- Laid down: date unknown
- Launched: date unknown
- Completed: 20 November 1945
- Acquired: May 1945
- Commissioned: returned to the US Maritime Commission (MARCOM) prior to commissioning
- Identification: Hull symbol: AK-204; Code letters: NXNH
- Fate: Returned to MARCOM, 20 November 1945

United States
- Name: Coastal Observer
- Owner: MARCOM
- Operator: Lykes Brothers Steamship Company, Inc. (1945–1946); Mississippi Shipping Company (1949)
- Acquired: 20 November 1945
- In service: 20 November 1945
- Out of service: 11 July 1949
- Fate: Sold, 13 July 1956

Brazil
- Name: Rio Mossoró
- Operator: Companhia Nacional de Navegacao Costerira, Patrimonio Nacional
- Acquired: 13 July 1956
- In service: 15 February 1957
- Renamed: Guararapes in 1971
- Fate: Broken up at Recife in 1984

General characteristics
- Class & type: Alamosa-class cargo ship
- Type: C1-M-AV1
- Tonnage: 5,032 long tons deadweight (DWT)
- Displacement: 2,382 long tons (2,420 t) (standard); 7,450 long tons (7,570 t) (full load)
- Length: 388 ft 8 in (118.47 m)
- Beam: 50 ft (15 m)
- Draft: 21 ft 1 in (6.43 m)
- Installed power: 1 × Nordberg, TSM 6 diesel engine; 1,750 shp (1,300 kW)
- Propulsion: 1 × propeller
- Speed: 11.5 kn (21.3 km/h; 13.2 mph)
- Capacity: 3,945 t (3,883 long tons) DWT; 9,830 cu ft (278 m^{3}) (refrigerated); 227,730 cu ft (6,449 m^{3}) (non-refrigerated)
- Complement: 15 Officers; 70 Enlisted
- Armament: 1 × 3 in (76 mm)/50-caliber dual-purpose gun (DP); 6 × 20 mm (0.8 in) Oerlikon anti-aircraft (AA) cannons

USS Pitkin (AK-204) was an Alamosa-class cargo ship that was constructed for the US Navy during the closing period of World War II. By the time she was scheduled for commissioning, the war's end caused her to be declared “excess to needs” and she was returned to the US Government and struck by the Navy.

== Construction ==
Pitkin was laid down under US Maritime Commission (MARCOM) contract, MC hull 2158, by Globe Shipbuilding Co., Superior, Wisconsin. She was transferred to the Navy in May 1945. Pitkin was scheduled for commissioning. However, because of the Allied victory in the Pacific Ocean theatre of operations, her commissioning was cancelled. Pitkin was ordered returned to MARCOM for disposal. Her name subsequently reverted to Coastal Observer.

== Merchant service ==
Coastal Competitor was used by several shipping companies from 1945 to 1948, when she was placed in the reserve fleet.

On 13 July 1956, she was sold to Companhia Nacional de Navegacao Costerira, Patrimonio Nacional, of Brazil, for $693,682, under the condition that she be used for coastal shipping. She was delivered on 2 February 1957. She was broken up at Recife in 1984.

== Notes ==
Citations

== Bibliography ==
Online resources

- "C1 Cargo Ships". www.ShipbuildingHistory.com. 28 August 2009.
- "USS Pitkin (AK-204)". NavSource. 24 June 2011.
- "Coastal Observer". United States Department of Transportation. Archived from the original on November 4, 2016.
