= USS Crescent City =

Coordinates: 38.101113°N 122.268966°W

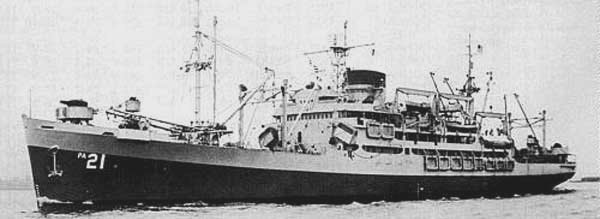
- USS Crescent City (APA-21)

History

United States
- Name: Delorleans (1940); Crescent City (1941)
- Namesake: A popular nickname for New Orleans, Louisiana
- Builder: Bethlehem Steel
- Launched: 17 February 1940
- Sponsored by: Mrs M. L. Pedrick
- Christened: Delorleans
- Acquired: 9 June 1941
- Commissioned: 10 October 1941
- Decommissioned: 30 April 1948
- Renamed: TS Golden Bear II, Artship
- Reclassified: AP-40 to APA-21, 1 February 1943
- Stricken: 12 April 1946
- Identification: IMO number: 8424666; Callsign: KIYG
- Honours and awards: Ten battle stars for World War II service
- Fate: Sold for scrap, January 2012

General characteristics
- Class & type: Crescent City class attack transport
- Displacement: 8,409 tons (lt), 14,247 t.(fl)
- Length: 491 ft (150 m)
- Beam: 65 ft 6 in (19.96 m)
- Draft: 26 ft (7.9 m)
- Propulsion: 1 × General Electric geared drive turbine, 2 × boilers, designed shaft horsepower 7,800
- Speed: 17 knots (31 km/h)
- Capacity: Troops: 58 Officers, 1,102 Enlisted; Cargo: 140,000 cu ft (4,000 m^{3}), 2,300 long tons (2,300 t)
- Complement: Officers 36, Enlisted 498
- Armament: 4 × 3"/50 caliber DP gun mounts, 2 × twin 40 mm gun mounts, 2 × single 40 mm gun mounts, 14 × single 20 mm gun mounts.

USS Crescent City (AP-40/APA-21) was the lead ship of the Crescent City-class attack transports that served with the US Navy during World War II. The ship was built as the cargo and passenger liner Delorleans for the Mississippi Shipping Company's Delta Line. After brief commercial operation the ship was among 28 vessels requisitioned in June 1941 for the Navy and the Army. The Navy renamed the ship Crescent City, a popular nickname for New Orleans, Louisiana, upon commissioning 10 October 1941. The ship was decommissioned and laid up in 1948 before being loaned to the California Maritime Academy to serve as a training ship 1971–1995 and then transferred to a foundation in a failed art colony project. The ship left California for Texas scrapping in 2012.

== Construction ==
Originally named the SS Delorleans, the ship was contracted on 16 December 1938 by Maritime Commission as a Type C3 ship hull No. 49. The keel was laid 8 May 1939, by the Bethlehem Steel Company, Sparrows Point Maryland where she was launched on 17 February 1940, and delivered to Delta Lines on 23 August 1940.

Delorleans was the second of a series of six ships, the previous ship being Delbrasil and next the Deltargentino, designed by the Mississippi Shipping Company, as a modification of the standard C3 design, to carry both passengers and cargo between New Orleans and Buenos Aires on the so-called "Coffee Run". Twenty six staterooms accommodated 67 passengers on the shelter deck. The names Deltargentino (1942) and Delorleans (1942) were later reused during construction for ships of the same basic design that were also put into service as commissioned Navy ships.

== Government requisition ==
The Maritime Commission's Division of Emergency Shipping announced on 4 June 1941 that it had requisitioned twenty-eight merchant vessels (twenty-one for the Navy and seven to the Army) among which Delorleans was among the group allocated to Navy. The Navy assumed control on 9 June 1941 and stripped the ship to prepare her for war duty with commissioning on 10 October 1941 as the USS Crescent City. Originally classified AP-40, she was converted to an attack transport at Alabama Dry Dock and Shipbuilding of Mobile, Alabama; and commissioned 10 October 1941. She was reclassified APA-21, 1 February 1943.

== World War II ==
Departing Norfolk, Virginia 15 December 1941 loaded with troops and equipment, Crescent City debarked her passengers in the Panama Canal Zone, then sailed to San Diego to load Navy and Marine passengers for Pearl Harbor. She carried civilian evacuees back to San Diego, returning immediately with workers and equipment to rush repairs of the damaged naval base at Pearl Harbor. Assigned to transport men and equipment to set up the advanced base at Efate, New Hebrides, she voyaged on this mission until arriving at San Diego 22 April 1942 for a brief overhaul.

=== Invasion of Guadalcanal ===
On 1 July 1942 Crescent City sailed from San Diego bound for the initial assault landings on Guadalcanal. Landing her troops 7 August under heavy air attack, she splashed at least five of the enemy planes. For two days she remained at anchor unloading the necessary supplies to hold the beachhead, then returned to Espiritu Santo to unload material to set up a new forward base to supply the Guadalcanal operations.

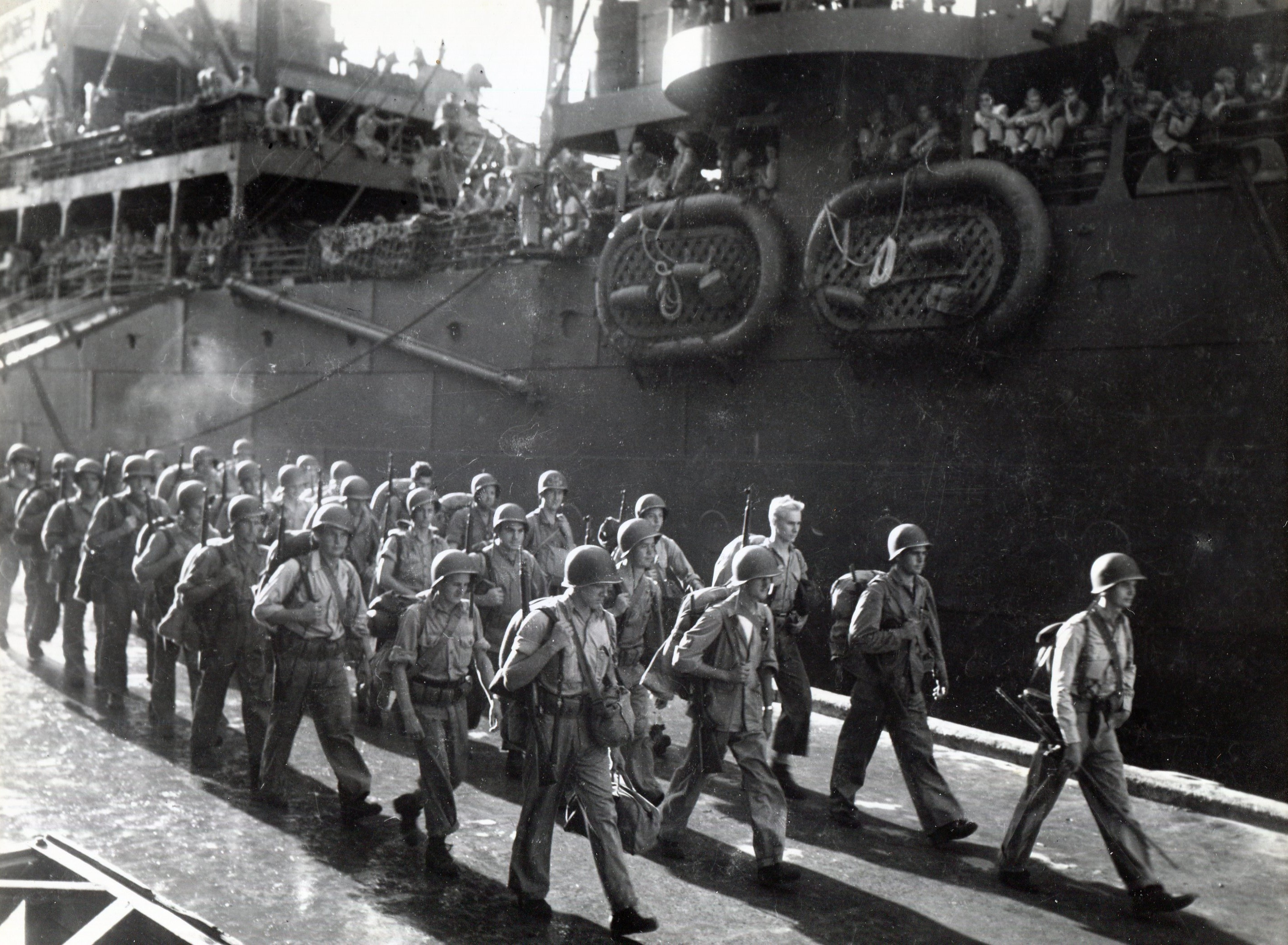
U.S. Marines disembarking from the USS Crescent City at Brisbane, Australia, after serving in the Solomon Islands campaign, c. 1943

Sailing from Brisbane, Australia, and Wellington, New Zealand to the advanced bases at Nouméa and Espiritu Santo, then dodging enemy forces to deliver men and equipment to sway the balance toward victory on Guadalcanal was Crescent City's mission through the next few months. When the offensive began to swing north through the Solomon Islands in early 1943, she continued her transport duty to the base established on hard-won Guadalcanal. On 13 August, while unloading, she aided in repelling an air attack in which USS John Penn (APA-23) was sunk.

=== Invasion of Bougainville ===
On 28 October 1943 Crescent City sortied for the invasion of Bougainville, landing troops at Empress Augusta Bay under air attack 1 November. On the 13th, after helping repel a torpedo bomber attack, she landed support troops brought from Tulagi and Port Purvis on Florida Island. Continuing her inter-Solomons transport and resupply duty, she took part in the assault landings on Emirau Island on 11 April 1944 and reported to Guadalcanal 30 April to prepare for the Marianas operation.

=== Invasions of Peleliu and Leyte ===
Crescent City was held in reserve during the assaults on Kwajalein and Eniwetok, then landed her troops and embarked casualties at Guam from 21 to 25 July 1944. She returned to Guadalcanal 16 August for the staging of the Palau operation, taking part in the landings on Peleliu on 15 September. Ten days later she arrived at Humboldt Bay, New Guinea and sailed on 16 October for the invasion of Leyte. After landing troops of the 6th Army at San Pedro Bay on 22 October, she sailed before the outbreak of the Battle for Leyte Gulf. The transport brought reinforcements to Leyte from Hollandia, and arrived at Manus Island on 20 November to embark passengers for the United States.

=== Conversion to hospital ship ===
After overhaul, Crescent City departed San Francisco on 25 February 1945 and arrived at Pearl Harbor 4 March. Here she was converted to a temporary hospital evacuation ship, and two weeks later was underway for Kerama Retto, arriving 6 April. Receiving casualties from the beaches of Okinawa and from other ships, she transferred them to USS Hope (AH-7) for evacuation. Crescent City remained at Okinawa receiving casualties and transients until the end of the war.

=== After hostilities ===
Aiding in the redeployment of troops for the occupation of China, Crescent City lifted the 1st Marine Division to Taku between 30 September and 6 October 1945, and carried Chinese troops from Hong Kong to Chinwangtao and Qingdao in November. Returning to Okinawa 1 December she embarked men eligible for discharge and sailed for Seattle, arriving 20 December.

Departing Seattle 23 January 1946 Crescent City arrived at Norfolk on 14 February. She operated from New York and Norfolk on training duty in the Caribbean until 10 October 1947 when she sailed for the west coast.

=== Decommission ===
Arriving at San Francisco 1 November, Crescent City was placed out of commission in reserve 30 April 1948 and transferred to the Maritime Commission 3 September 1948.

=== Awards and decorations ===
Crescent City was awarded the Navy Unit Commendation for her outstanding performance throughout World War II, and received 10 battle stars.

=== Postwar service ===
After decommission, Crescent City was laid up in the National Defense Reserve Fleet at Suisun Bay, Benicia, California.

On 28 August 1970 the Maritime Administration (MARAD) loaned the ship for training purposes to the California Maritime Academy who renamed her TS Golden Bear. She sailed on 28 major ocean cruises over 24 years. In 1995 she was returned to MARAD and the Reserve Fleet.

On 28 October 1997 the ship was returned to MARAD custody. The ship had been approved for donation to the Artship Foundation of Oakland, California with donation pending in the Department of Defense budget authorization, but the provision did not make it from draft legislation to enacted 1996 legislation. On eventual transfer the ship was renamed Artship as part of a failed art colony project. Artship was sold in 2004 to be scrapped in Texas, but dismantling was halted due to high PCB levels and because she was considered too historic.

=== Scrapping ===
On 7 November 2012 S.S. Pacific Star (formerly Delorleans, Crescent City, Golden Bear, Artship) was auctioned off for $1 on the steps of the United States District Court for the Eastern District of California. She departed Mare Island, California 15 January 2012 under tow for Brownsville, Texas where she was eventually scrapped.

== See also ==
- SS Delbrasil (design details)
