= SS Oshkosh Victory =

Victory ship of the United States

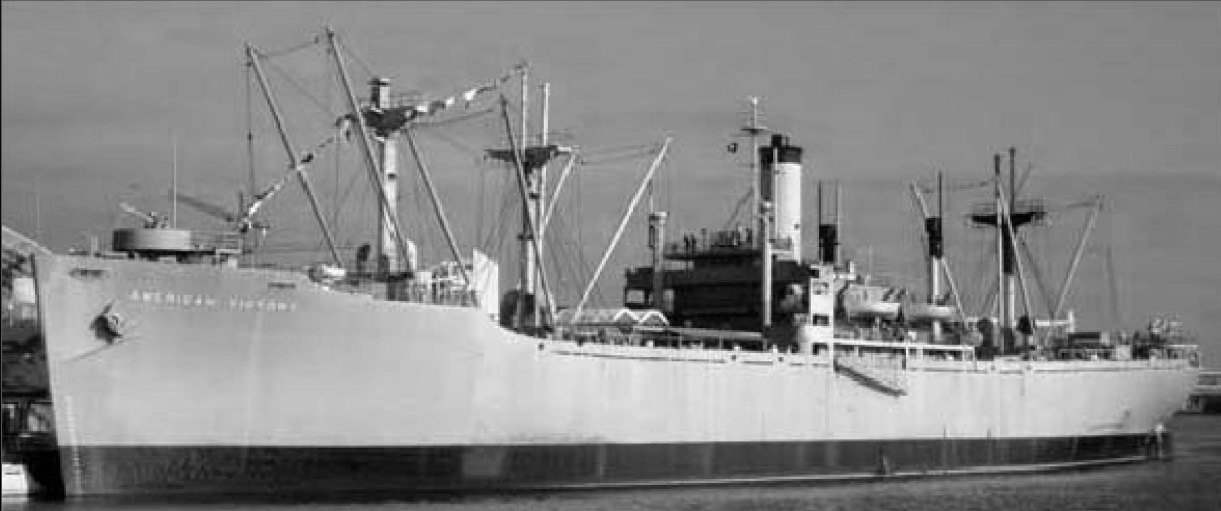
- VC2-S-AP2 type Victory ship

History

United States
- Name: Oshkosh Victory
- Namesake: Oshkosh, Wisconsin
- Owner: War Shipping Administration
- Operator: Mississippi Shipping Company
- Builder: California Shipbuilding (Calship)
- Cost: $2,619,724
- Laid down: June 6, 1945
- Launched: August 9, 1945, Los Angeles, California
- Acquired: September 10, 1945
- In service: 1945
- Home port: San Pedro, California
- Identification: IMO number: 5266128
- Fate: Scrapped 1992

General characteristics
- Class & type: VC2-S-AP2 Victory Ship
- Tonnage: 10,750 long tons deadweight (DWT)
- Length: 455 ft (139 m)
- Beam: 62 ft (19 m)
- Draft: 28 ft 6 in (8.69 m)
- Propulsion: Allis-Chalmers cross-compound steam turbine with double reduction gears; 6,000 hp at 90 rpm (4,500 kW)
- Speed: 17 kn (31 km/h; 20 mph)
- Range: 23,500 mi (20,400 nmi; 37,800 km)
- Capacity: 500,000 cu ft (14,000 m^{3}) (approx.)
- Complement: 62 United States Merchant Marine and United States Navy Armed Guard
- Armament: 5-inch (127 mm) stern gun, 3-inch (76 mm) bow anti-aircraft gun, 8× Oerlikon 20 mm cannon

SS Oshkosh Victory was a United States Victory ship which entered service in the Pacific Ocean shortly after the end of World War II. The ship's US Maritime Commission designation was VC2-S-AP3, hull number 808 (V-808). The ship was built at the California Shipbuilding Yard (Calship) in Los Angeles, California and was delivered on September 10, 1945. SS Oshkosh Victory was the 808th of the new 10,500-ton class ships known as Victory ships. SS Oshkosh Victory was built in 96 days, under the Emergency Shipbuilding program.

== Design ==
Victory ships were designed to replace the earlier Liberty ships, intended solely for use in World War II. They were designed to last longer and serve the US Navy after the war. Victory ships were faster, longer, wider, and taller than Liberty ships, had a thinner stack set farther toward the superstructure, and had a long raised forecastle.

== Commissioning ==
Oshkosh Victory was laid down during World War II on June 6, 1945, after Victory in Europe Day but before the end of the Pacific War. Calship's 458th ship, she was named for the city of Oshkosh, Wisconsin. On August 9, 1945, Mrs. Hubert M. Walker, widow of a California building contractor, gave the ship her champagne christening. Miss Elizabeth Chapman of Hollywood was in attendance to represent the city of Oshkosh. The SS Oshkosh Victory entered service on September 10, 1945. With the surrender of Japan on 15 August 1945, she was not needed to support a planned invasion of the Japanese main island (see Operation Downfall).

== Marshal Plan ==
The SS Oshkosh Victory was operated by the Mississippi Shipping Company as a US Merchant Marine ship. She transported supplies to help war-torn nations in the Far East under the Marshall Plan. The Oshkosh Victory's home port was Los Angeles.

On March 2, 1946, the SS Oshkosh Victory was damaged after hitting a mine in the Yangtze River, in China. No crew members were injured.

In 1948, SS Oshkosh Victory was laid up in Suisun Bay and later transferred to James River at part of the National Defense Reserve Fleet.

== Korean War ==
SS Oshkosh Victory served in the US Merchant Marine during the Korean War. Merchant Marine ships carried about 90 percent of the cargo delivered to the war zone. Between November 18, 1950 and December 23, 1952, the SS Oshkosh Victory transported food, mail and other goods for the war. After the Korean War, she was returned to the National Defense Reserve Fleet.

== Decommissioning and disposal ==
In 1992, the SS Oshkosh Victory was scrapped at Alang, India.

== See also ==
- List of Victory ships
- Liberty ship
- Type C1 ship
- Type C2 ship
- Type C3 ship

== Sources ==
- Sawyer, L.A. and W.H. Mitchell. Victory ships and tankers: The history of the 'Victory type" cargo ships and of the tankers built in the United States of America during World War II, Cornell Maritime Press, 1974, 0-87033-182-5.
- United States Maritime Commission:
- Victory Cargo Ships

== Sources ==
- Sawyer, L.A. and W.H. Mitchell. Victory ships and tankers: The history of the 'Victory' type cargo ships and of the tankers built in the United States of America during World War II, Cornell Maritime Press, 1974, 0-87033-182-5.
- United States Maritime Commission:
- Victory Cargo Ships
