= Mississippi Shipping Company =

Passengers and Shipping Company

- Industry: Maritime transport
- Founded: 1919
- Defunct: 1982
- Successor: Crowley Maritime
- Headquarters: Seattle, Washington
- Area served: Gulf of Mexico, South America and cargo only West Africa
- Services: Cargo and Passengers Liners

The Mississippi Shipping Company also known as Delta Line, was a passenger and cargo steamship company founded in 1919 in New Orleans, Louisiana. In 1961, the company officially changed its name to Delta Line. The Mississippi Shipping Company serviced ports in the Gulf of Mexico and along the east coast of South America. Initially formed to support coffee merchants and Brazilian produce to New Orleans and up the Mississippi River, the company competed with New York City-based shipping lines.

Delta Line failed to modernize and upgrade to container ships in the 1970s, unlike many of its competitors. In 1982, the company, by then owned by the Holiday Inn Corporation, sold its operations to Crowley Maritime, the largest U.S. barge and tugboat operator at the time. Crowley began modernizing the fleet on the route but sold the shipping line to United States Lines in 1985. United States Lines incorporated some of the ships into its routes but went bankrupt in 1986.

At its peak in 1949, the Mississippi-Delta Line owned 14 ships with a total of 98,000 gross register tons. Delta Line also ventured into passenger cruises, although further details are unclear. During World War II, the Mississippi Shipping Company played a significant role in charter shipping with the Maritime Commission and War Shipping Administration. During the war, the company operated Victory ships, Liberty ships, and several Empire ships.

== Routes ==
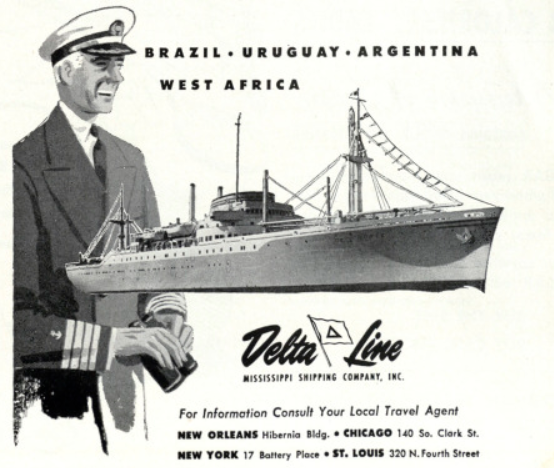
1956 advertisement for Delta Line

- Routes from 1919 to 1967.
- US Ports:New Orleans and Houston
- South America: Saint Thomas, Barbados, Curaçao, Rio de Janeiro, Santo, Brazil, Paranaguá, Montevideo, Buenos Aires
- Routes from 1978 to 1982:
  - Vancouver, Tacoma, San Francisco, Los Angeles, Manzanillo, Balboa, Panama Canal, Cartagena, Puerto Cabello, La Guaira, Rio de Janeiro, Santos, Paranagua/Rio Grande (optional), Buenos Aires, Strait of Magellan, Valparaiso, Callao, Guayaquil, Buenaventura, Los Angeles, San Francisco, Vancouver, Tacoma. Seansonal port:Curaçao, Aruba, Recife, Montevideo, Antofagasta and Corinto.
- Starting in 1961 West Africa cargo routes to:
  - Angol, Cameroon, Ivory Coast, Liberia and Congo.

== Del ships ==
- The three "Del" cruise ships, designed by naval architect George G. Sharp of New York, Type C3-class ship hull with a custom design. Built at Ingalls Shipyard in Pascagoula, Mississippi at $7,000,000 each. Completed in 1946 and 1947, the three had new commercial radar. Delta Line (Mississippi) had two departures per month from Gulf of Mexico ports to the Caribbean and South America. Passenger cruise service ended in 1967 and the ships were converted to cargo. In 1975 the three were scrapped in Indonesia.
- SS Del Norte
- SS Del Sud
- SS Del Mar

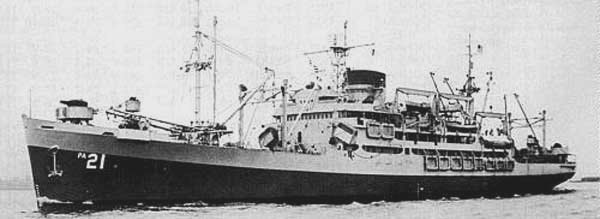
SS Delorleans, in World War 2

- SS Delmundo, a 1919 cargo ship torpedoed in 1942 by U-600 and sank off Cuba, eight crew were killed.
- SS Delbrasil
- SS Delorleans
- SS Deltargentino
- SS Del Uruguay, taken over by the US Navy during construction, became USS Charles Carroll (APA-28) in 1942
- SS Delvalle, sunk by U-154 in April 1942

=== Other ships ===
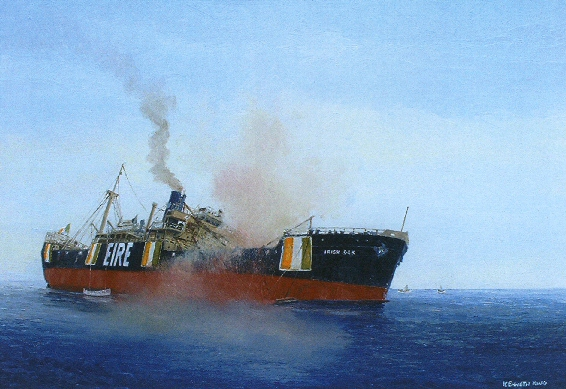
SS Irish Oak painting by Kenneth King depicting the moments after the Irish Oak was torpedoed in 1943

- SS Afel
- SS Agawam
- SS Lorraine Cross, a 1918 tweendecker. Torpedoed February 20, 1942.
- SS Coastal Observer
- SS Irish Oak, a 1919 cargo ship, Mississippi Shipping Company owned 1928–1933.
- SS Del Santos, for six months in 1942, became USS Thurston

== Santa Ships ==
Starting in 1978 to 1984 operated four "Santa" ships: All four C4-S1-49a ship were sold to Crowley Maritime in 1984. All four were purchased from the Grace Line - Prudential Lines by Delta Line. Built in 1963 at Bethlehem Sparrows Point Shipyard. All were scrapped in 1988.

- Santa Magdalena
- Santa Mercedes
- Santa Mariana
- Santa Maria

== World War 2 ==
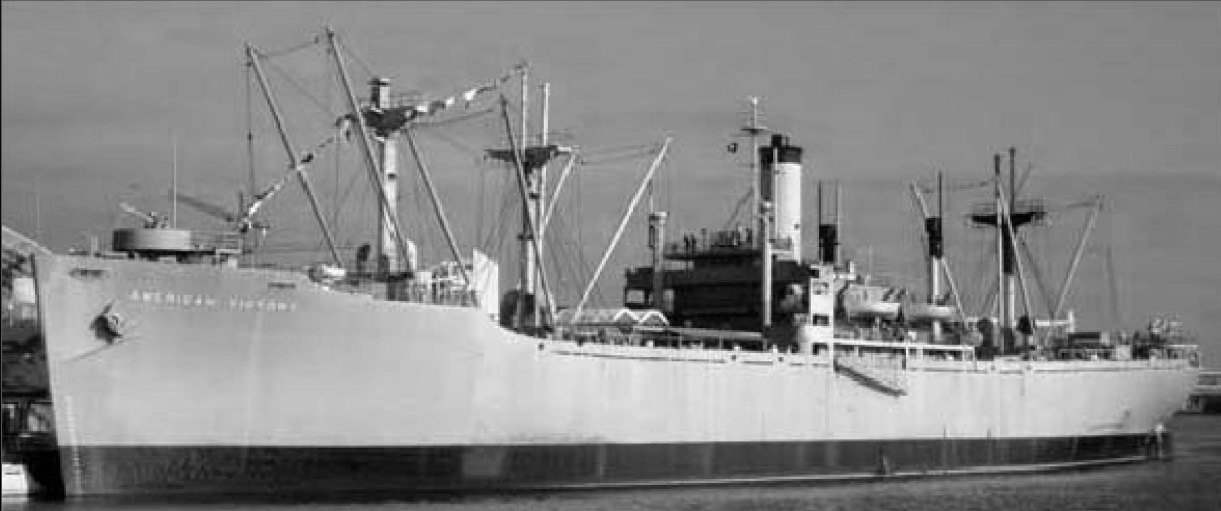
World War II Victory ship

World War 2 Maritime ships:

- SS Aiken Victory
- SS Bluefield Victory
- SS Brazil Victory
- SS Benjamin Contee
- SS Carthage Victory
- SS Charles Henderson
- SS Cuba Victory
- SS Luray Victory
- SS Oshkosh Victory
- SS Ouachita Victory
- SS Tulane Victory
- SS Josiah Parker
- SS Robert M. La Follette
- SS Clarence King
- SS Harriet Monroe
- SS Murray M. Blum
- SS John A. Roebling
- Empire Shearwater
- USS Thurston
- SS West Kasson
- SS Union Victory (Korean War operator)
