= Green Pond (Stillwater, New York) =

- Location of Green Pond within New York
- Location: Herkimer County, New York
- Coordinates: 43°57′47″N 75°03′35″W
- Type: Lake
- Basin countries: United States
- Surface area: 10 acres (4.0 ha)
- Surface elevation: 1,936 ft (590 m)
- Islands: 1
- Settlements: Stillwater

Green Pond is a small lake north-northwest of Stillwater in Herkimer County, New York. It drains south via an unnamed creek which flows into Gregg Lake.

== See also ==
- List of lakes in New York
