= Green Pond (Stillwater Mountain, New York) =

- Location of Green Pond within New York
- Location: Herkimer County, New York
- Coordinates: 43°52′20″N 75°05′54″W
- Type: Lake
- Surface elevation: 1,611 feet (491 m)
- Settlements: Moshier Falls

Green Pond is a small lake east of Moshier Falls in Herkimer County, New York. It drains west via an unnamed creek which flows into Sunday Creek.

== See also ==
- List of lakes in New York
