= Green Pond Marsh =

Wetlands area in Bethlehem Township, Pennsylvania, US

Green Pond Marsh is the name of a wetlands area located in Bethlehem Township, Pennsylvania. The marsh is located approximately one-quarter mile (0.4 km) south of U.S. Route 22 (the Lehigh Valley Thruway) and east of Farmersville Road. It is bisected by Green Pond Road. The marsh is separated from Green Pond (a permanent body of water approximately 5.1 acres [2.06 hectares] in area) by Farmersville Road.

== Geographic description ==
The portion south of Green Pond Road lies entirely within Northampton County's parcel ID M7 12 4 0205, described in the county's online assessment records as being 68 acres (27.5 hectares) in area. The property is listed as being owned by Green Pond Golf Course, Inc., and records show it was acquired in 1979. Areas north of Green Pond Road fall into multiple real estate parcels and are zoned for single-family homes.

== History ==
=== Pre-European period ===
The Lenni Lenape, or Delaware, a Native American people, lived in the eastern Pennsylvania area in the vicinity of today's Green Pond. The countryside was described as "once a favorite meeting place, and hunting; and fishing ground of the Indians." In the same work, Fritts also cited evidence that "[t]races of the Indians still remain in the township, though they are becoming fainter and fainter, as the years roll on. On the farm of Mr. Leonard Schweitzer, there is an old grave, which tradition says was that of a Delaware chief, and the finding of a tomahawk in the ground near it, a few years since, seems to strengthen belief in the truth of the legend."

Barry Kresge, a member of the Society for Pennsylvania Archaeology, has found artifacts of the Lenni Lenape in the immediate area of Green Pond Marsh since 1965. An object he described to a reporter from the Express-Times newspaper as a portion of a semi-lunar knife used by native women to clean fish was one of many items he has found in the area. This and other finds (including arrowheads, spear points, ax heads, and other tools as reported by an Express-Times reporter) prompted him to list the property as a Pennsylvania Historical Site with the Pennsylvania Historical and Museum Commission in 2005.

=== Colonial era to World War II ===
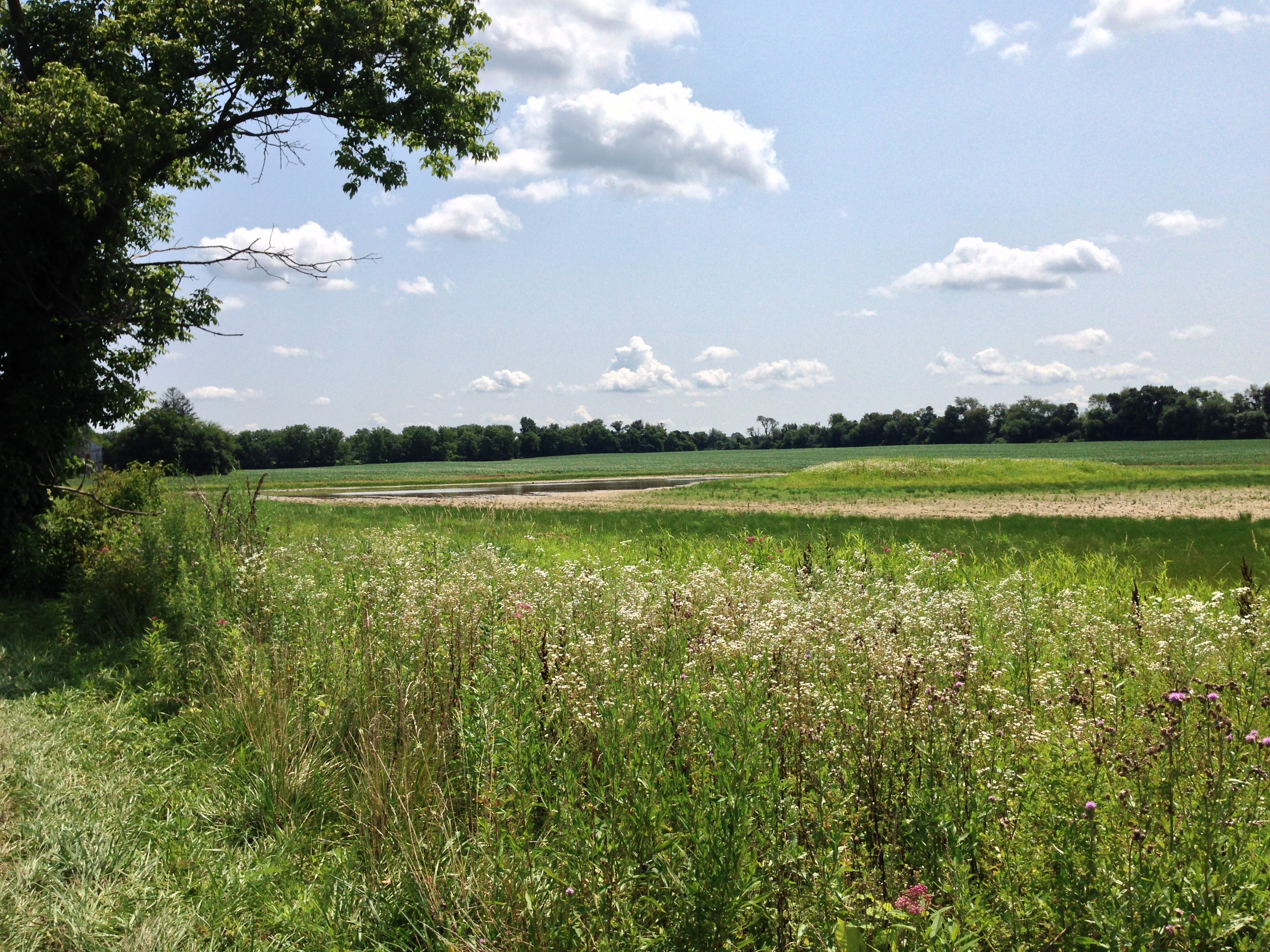
Green Pond Marsh designated as Important Bird Area by Pennsylvania Audubon on March 30, 2014

The Green Pond area was part of a 5000-acre (2023 hectare) tract owned by Leticia Aubrey, daughter of William Penn. A work published by the Northampton County Historical and Genealogical Society in 1937, "The Penn Patents in the Forks of the Delaware", contains a map called the "Drylands Tract" showing a semicolon-shaped pond at the point where five parcels deeded to (from northeast corner of pond moving clockwise) John Buss, Jacob Bunstein, George Hartzell, Frederick King et al., and Conrad Kocher. At the time of the property transfer, Fritts stated that the settlers found "unbroken forest" around what was then named "Dry Lands Pond". This land, according to Fritts, "was formerly known as the 'Dry Lands,' which were then thought to be so irreclaimably arid and barren, that they would never be fit for human habitation but which are now among the best lands of the county." The year-round pond and its adjoining wetlands were the only body of surface water in that part of Bethlehem Township.

According to research done by James Wright and Linda Wright in their book, "Place Names of Northampton County, Pennsylvania", the current name of the pond may come from either the green vegetation and trees surrounding it or from the green scum which sometimes forms on the [adjacent pond's] surface in dry conditions. The Wrights note that Green Pond itself was owned by descendants of William Penn until 1931, when it was transferred to "Mr. Snyder" from the Stuart family of Bath, England. The new owners, their descendants, and subsequent owners, all farmers, cultivated their properties through the end of World War II.

=== World War II to the present ===
Development interests in Bethlehem Township subdivided many of the original Aubrey parcels. However, the largest and most marshy parcel remains in agriculture today. Zoning for the largest parcel, according to a zoning map published by Bethlehem Township, is "Rural Agricultural", represented by a pale green tint on parcels on their GIS map on the township's website. Ownership of the 68-acre parcel, also according to the metadata in the zoning map, is Green Pond Golf Course, Inc., with a purchase date of January 1, 1979.

== Ecological significance ==
Studies are currently underway to determine the extent of the marshy area and its qualification as a Federally-recognized and -protected wetland. The parcel and adjoining areas recently received a Pennsylvania Audubon Society designation as an "Important Bird Area" (defined by the Audubon Society as "sites that provide essential habitat for one or more species of bird"). Members of the Lehigh Valley Audubon Society and other qualified spotters have identified 161 species of birds in the Green Pond Marsh area, including the Pennsylvania-endangered species of American bittern, black-crowned night heron, black tern, blackpoll warbler, common tern, and great egret. The two Pennsylvania-threatened species are the northern harrier and the osprey.

== Designation as an Important Bird Area (IBA) ==
A descriptive document filed with the National Audubon Society, Pennsylvania Audubon, and the Lehigh Valley Audubon Society to support the nomination of the Green Pond area as an Important Bird Area (IBA) described the site as:

a large open agricultural field with 2–3 depressions that collect water during most of the year and becoming dry sometimes during summer months. It is fed periodically by an adjacent six-acre pond that lies across the rural township road from the Green Pond Marsh area. The soils have been examined by an ecologist and determined to be hydric, characteristic of wetlands. In recent years the fields are planted with corn and left fallow during winter and spring. Thickets adjacent to fields and pond attract wet-thicket birds, including occasional blackbird flocks including Rusty Blackbird. The Green Pond Marsh is a premiere site for wetland birds in eastern Pennsylvania with large numbers of shorebirds and waterfowl using the shallow pools for stopover on migration. Records of concentrations date back to 1970s but they may have occurred over a longer period. Compared to other pond or lake areas in the region it appears to offer a unique habitat and attracts larger concentrations than seen in many areas of eastern Pennsylvania. The shorebird and waterfowl numbers can rival current IBAs such as Middle Creek WMA in concentration for areas in eastern counties.

A list of the 157 species of birds seen in the immediate Green Pond area and recorded at the ebird.com website (a joint project of the National Audubon Society and the Cornell Lab of Ornithology) represents birds spotted and recorded since 1990; other records maintained by local and national organizations are available in print form and extend further back in time.

On March 30, 2014, the Pennsylvania Ornithological Technical Committee approved Green Pond Marsh as an IBA. The committee approved the designation based on the following three criteria:

1. D3-PA: species in rare/unique habitat – The qualities of the area meeting the standards for being named an IBA include the area's shallow pools with adjacent open fields.
2. D4ii-PA: waterfowl (>2,000 at one time) – The general D4 designation describes a stopover site; the "ii" subdesignation represents use by waterfowl during their spring and fall migration. More than 2,000 waterfowl at one time have been spotted at the Green Pond IBA.
3. D4v-PA: shorebirds (>100) – The general D4 designation describes a stopover site; the "v" subdesignation represents use by shorebirds during their spring and fall migration. More than 100 shorebirds at one time have been spotted at the Green Pond IBA.

== Soil composition ==
A portion of a sketch plan created by the engineering firm of Pennoni Associates and dated July 7, 2014 includes a box summarizing the Northampton County soil report for the parcel. A summary of the soils table shown on the Pennoni sketch plan describes the parcel as having four types of soil:

1. Clarksburg Silt Loam (ClA), in hydrologic soil group "C"
2. Urban land, nearly level slopes (UrA), with no hydrologic soil group
3. Washington Silt Loam (WaA), in hydrologic soil group B
4. Washington Silt Loam (WaB), in hydrologic soil group B

Limitations cited in the "Building Sites" column indicate "slow permeability, seasonal high water table" for the ClA/hydrologic soil group C area and "moderate permeability, slight hazard of groundwater contamination" for the WaA and WaB/hydrologic soil group B areas.

The United States Department of Agriculture's Soil Conservation Service's "National Engineering Handbook" describes hydrologic soil group B as "hav[ing] moderately low runoff potential when thoroughly wet. Water transmission through the soil is unimpeded. Group B soils typically have between 10 percent and 20 percent clay and 50 percent to 90 percent sand and have loamy sand or sandy loam textures." The work describes hydrologic soil group C as having "moderately high runoff potential when thoroughly wet. Water transmission through the soil is somewhat restricted. Group c soils typically have between 20 percent and 40 percent clay and less than 50 percent sand and have loam, sandy clay loam, clay loam and silty clay loam textures."

== Green Pond Marsh and karst geology ==
Green Pond Marsh is in a section of Northampton County with karst geological features. Karst geology manifests itself on topographic maps with closed, semi-closed, or linear depressions. The depressions are caused by the deterioration of the underpinning limestone bedrock by ground water. In many cases in this area, sinkholes occur without warning. A 1986 study by W.E. Kochanov of the Pennsylvania Geological Survey showed over 40 symbols representing surface depressions in the Green Pond Marsh area.

A search of the Pennsylvania Department of Conservation and Natural Resources' online map viewer, when switched to "geology" view, indicated on February 8, 2015, that there were 13 sinkholes and 82 surface depressions within a one-half mile radius of the clicked marker.

In a 2005 information sheet on sinkholes, the Pennsylvania Department of Environmental Resources states that "[s]inkhole occurrences will likely become more frequent as population encroaches upon karst areas traditionally used for farmland". While homeowners in karst locations are not explicitly advised by the Pennsylvania Department of Environmental Resources to purchase sinkhole insurance, the sheet recommends becoming aware of the risks of construction in karst geological areas and what assistance is available from the state, if any, to mitigate the risk.

== Proposed development plans ==
Several attempts have been made to build homes in the past, including failed proposals by developers Toll Brothers and J.G. Petrucci (251 townhomes). The most recent proposal to develop the parcel south of Green Pond Road was presented to Bethlehem Township's Board of Commissioners in 2014 by Traditions of America, a company specializing in planned developments of communities in the state of Pennsylvania for persons 55 years of age and older. A July 2014 video shows the area proposed for development.

The sketch plan dated July 7, 2014, showed 265 homes on land zoned for 314. The breakdown of homes showed 191 single-family detached dwellings and 74 attached twin dwellings on the 68-acre (27.5 hectare) parcel. The plan included one conservation area of 80,000 feet (1.84 acres/0.74 hectares) and three stormwater management areas (retention ponds) totaling 497,000 square feet (11.41 acres/4.26 hectares), all in the northwest corner of the parcel.

Traditions of America's principals, Timothy R. McCarthy, Nathan Jameson, and David Biddison have built or are building other Traditions of America-branded developments in Pennsylvania, including in the communities of Bethlehem ("Bridle Path" and "Hanover"), Center Valley ("Saucon Valley"), Lititz ("Lititz" and "Mount Joy"), Mechanicsburg ("Silver Spring"), State College ("Liberty Hill"), Pittsburgh ("Sewickley Ridge"), and Cranberry Township ("Liberty Hills").

Properties adjacent to the Green Pond Marsh area are in the path of the proposed PennEast Pipeline, which is slated to be developed by a consortium of companies: AGL Resources, NJR Pipeline Company, South Jersey Industries, and UGI Energy Services. The pipeline is being constructed to carry Marcellus Shale natural gas from northeastern Pennsylvania to downstate distribution points and into New Jersey. The 36-inch (0.9-meter) pipeline will operate at a pressure of 1480 pounds per square inch (10,200 kPa) and is expected to go into operation in 2021. The proposed path of the pipeline is approximately 800 feet (243 meters) from the eastern border of the Green Pond property proposed for development and 0.67 mi (1.09 km) from the center of Green Pond itself.

== Green Pond Marsh and the U.S. Army Corps of Engineers ==
On November 17, 2014, the news blog Lehigh Valley Ramblings reported on a message from SaveGreenPond.org to its subscribers. It informed readers that the Army Corps of Engineers and staff from the Pennsylvania Department of Environmental Protection visited the site on November 12, 2014, to do a wetlands survey. They determined that 4.77 acres of the parcel proposed for development by Traditions of America was a wetland. The surveying team delineated the wetland area with pink flags and pink ribbon markers. A short video was produced on October 20, 2014, showing the excavations.
