= USAT J. W. McAndrew =

History
- Name: Deltargentino (1940 - 1941)
- Operator: Mississippi Shipping Company
- Builder: Bethlehem Sparrows Point Shipyard, Baltimore County, Maryland
- Laid down: 21 December 1939
- Launched: 13 July 1940
- Acquired: 8 November 1940
- Fate: Requisitioned by the United States Army, 28 June 1941

United States
- Name: J. W. McAndrew (1941 - 1948)
- Namesake: Major General James W. McAndrew
- Operator: United States Army
- Acquired: 28 June 1941
- Home port: New York Port of Embarkation
- Fate: Sold into commercial service, 22 December 1948
- Name: African Enterprise (1948 - 1971)
- Owner: Farrell Lines
- Operator: American South African Line
- In service: 1949
- Out of service: 1960
- Identification: O/N 240124
- Fate: To National Defense Reserve Fleet, 19 October 1960; Sold by MARAD, 9 April 1969; Broken up, February 1972

General characteristics
- Type: Maritime Commission Passenger & Cargo (C3 size)
- Tonnage: 7,997 GRT
- Displacement: 6,590 long tons (6,696 t) light; 14,247 long tons (14,476 t) full load
- Length: 491 ft 10 in (149.91 m) o/a; 465 ft (142 m) p/p
- Beam: 65 ft 6 in (19.96 m)
- Draft: 25 ft 7 in (7.80 m) maximum
- Propulsion: 1 × 7,800 hp (5,816 kW) General Electric turbine, 1 screw
- Speed: 17.8 knots (33.0 km/h; 20.5 mph)
- Range: 11,000 nmi (13,000 mi; 20,000 km)
- Capacity: Cargo:150,885 cubic feet (4,272.6 m^{3})
- Troops: 1,891
- Armament: 1942; 1 × 4"/50 caliber guns; 2 × 3"/50 caliber guns; 1943; 1 × 5"/51 caliber guns; 4 × 3"/50 caliber guns; 8 × 20 mm guns; 1945; 1 × 5"/38 caliber guns; 4 × 3"/50 caliber guns; 8 × 20 mm guns

USAT J. W. McAndrew was a Type C3-P&C troop ship for the United States Army during World War II.

The ship was built by the Bethlehem Sparrows Point Shipyard of Baltimore in 1940 as SS Deltargentino for the United States Maritime Commission on behalf of the Mississippi Shipping Company in 1940 for operation by its Delta Line. The ship was delivered to Mississippi Shipping in November 1940.

Deltargentino was among the ships designated for the Army among the twenty-eight merchant vessels (twenty-one for the Navy and seven to the Army) requisitioned by the Maritime Commission's Division of Emergency Shipping announced on 4 June 1941.

The Army acquired Deltargentino in New Orleans on 28 June 1941 giving it the name J. W. McAndrew honoring Major General James William McAndrew. The ship was quickly converted for troop transport and made four voyages between New Orleans and Cristobal, Panama Canal Zone. In November the transport was assigned to the New York Port of Embarkation from which it made trips to Puerto Rico, Jamaica, the Canal Zone, Trinidad, and New Orleans.

In late January 1942 the transport left New York for Australia returning in April and then in May transported troops to Iceland and Glasgow. From Glasgow the ship went to Cape Town, South Africa, before returning to New York in August to prepare for the invasion of North Africa 8–16 November 1942. After the landing the transport returned to New York to make regular voyages to African and European ports until May–June 1944 when the ship underwent major repairs. The ship would have been transferred to the Navy and named USS J. W. McAndrew (AP-47) in 1943, but this was cancelled. The major ports served between the North African landings and the end of the war were Oran, Casablanca, Algiers, Gibraltar, Belfast, the Clyde, Naples, Plymouth and Southampton and after the Normandy landings Cherbourg and Le Havre.

On 13 March 1945 in convoy during a storm the Béarn lost steering and collided with the transport resulting in the loss of 68 troops and one Naval Armed Guardsman. The destroyer escorts Earl K. Olsen and Roche rescued some men from the water. The transport put into Ponta Delgada, Azores for repairs before undergoing hull repairs at Bethlehem, Baltimore during May and June 1945. After repairs the transport made voyages out of the Hampton Roads Port of Embarkation going to Naples in July then making voyages from there and New York to Italian and French ports including Marseille through 1946.

J. W. McAndrew was returned to the Maritime Administration (MARAD) on 5 May 1947 as surplus and allocated by MARAD to Farrell Lines for operation by its American South African Line. The line purchased the ship on 22 December 1948 renaming it African Enterprise for operation until 22 September 1960 when the ship was traded in for credit. The ship was laid up in the James River National Defense Reserve Fleet 19 October, withdrawn briefly 28 September to 6 October 1966 for Navy to remove a spare tail shaft. On 9 April 1969 the ship was one of three sold for $191,666.66 as scrap to The Boston Metals Company. The ship was withdrawn from the fleet for scrapping on 8 May 1969. The ship was broken up in Baltimore in February 1972.

== Bibliography ==
- American Merchant Marine at War (2007). "U.S. Ships Sunk, Damaged or Detained in North Atlantic During World War II". USMM.org.
- Charles, Roland W. (1947). Troopships of World War II (PDF). Washington: The Army Transportation Association. p. 38. LCCN 47004779. Archived from the original (PDF) on 2 April 2015.
- Colton, Tim. "C3 Cargo Ships". Shipbuildinghistory.com. Colton Company. Archived from the original on 22 June 2009.
- Colton, Tim. "Transports (AP, APA, APH, APV)". Shipbuildinghistory.com. Colton Company. Archived from the original on 3 May 2009.
- "3,604 Killed On Troopships In 41 Months". Herald and Review. Decatur, Illinois. 13 June 1945. p. 12.
- "J.W.McAndrew (5004154)". Miramar Ship Index.
- Lloyds (1940–1941). "Lloyd's Register" (PDF). Lloyd's Register (through PlimsollShipData).
- Maritime Administration. "Deltargentino". Ship History Database Vessel Status Card. U.S. Department of Transportation, Maritime Administration.
- Naval History And Heritage Command. "Earl K. Olsen". Dictionary of American Naval Fighting Ships. Naval History And Heritage Command.
- Naval History And Heritage Command. "Roche (DE-197)". Dictionary of American Naval Fighting Ships. Naval History And Heritage Command.
- Roberts, Stephen S. (4 September 2005). "J. W. McAndrew". shipscribe.com.
- Bryan, B.J. (2011). The ship that never was : a story of U.S. Armed Guard and the merchant ships of World War II. [S.l.]: Xlibris. ISBN 9781456877675.
