= Bethlehem Works =

Steel mill in Pennsylvania, US

Coordinates: 40.615°N 75.367°W

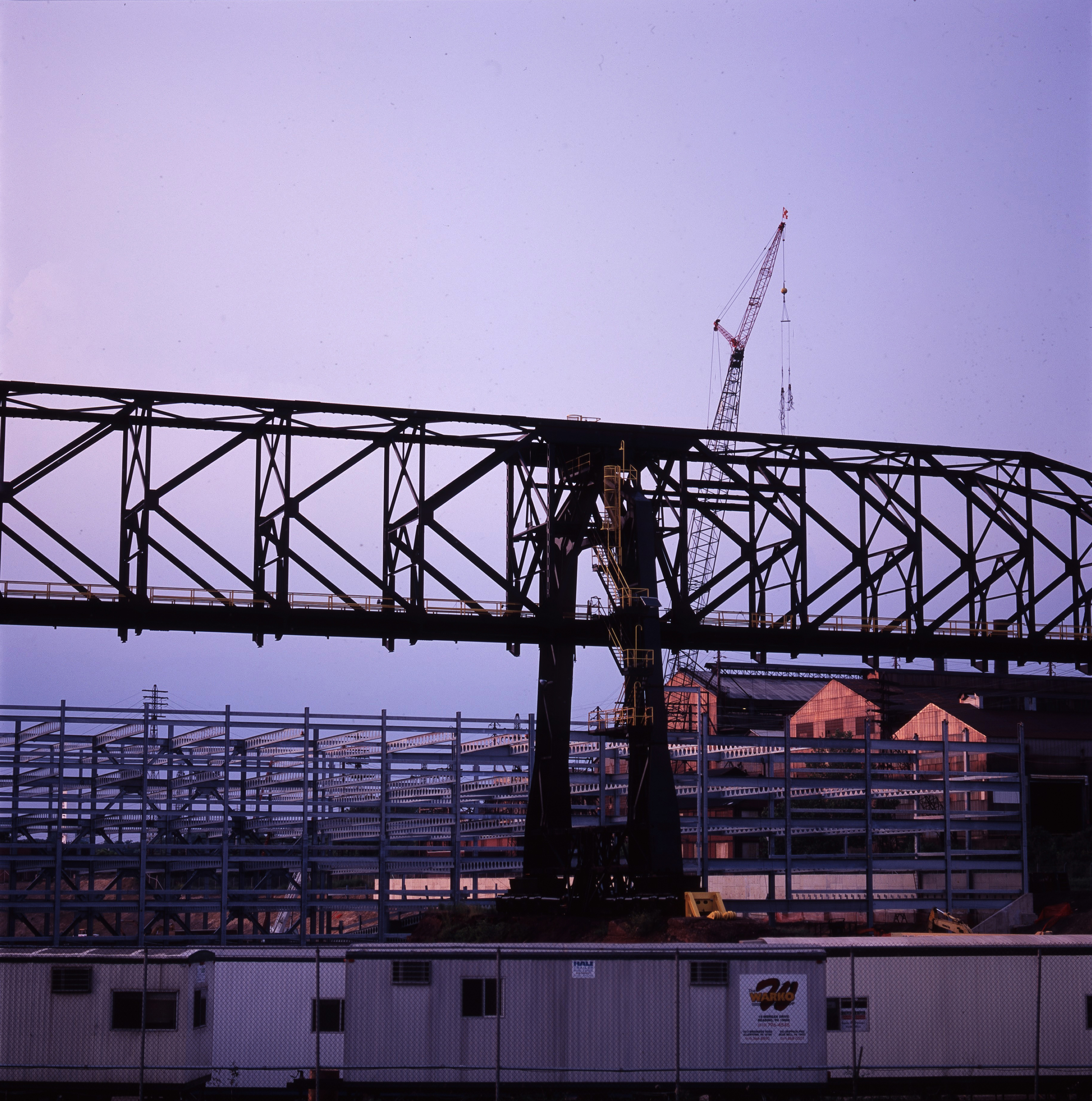
Wind Creek Bethlehem on Bethlehem Works in Bethlehem, Pennsylvania

Bethlehem Works is a 120-acre (0.49 km^{2}) development site in Bethlehem, Pennsylvania, based on land formerly owned by Bethlehem Steel.

After Bethlehem Steel discontinued its steelmaking activities at the main Bethlehem plant in 1995 after about 140 years of metal production, outside consultants developed concept plans for the reuse of the property. The plan was to rename the site "Bethlehem Works" and to use the land for cultural, recreational, educational, entertainment and retail development, including the Smithsonian Institution, an educational and research institution.

== Timeline ==
=== 1995 ===
Spring - Adaptive land use and environmental consultants retained by Bethlehem Steel to explore new uses for land to be vacated by the transition from steelmaking.

November - Bethlehem Steel ends about 140 years of metal production on the south shore of the Lehigh River.

=== 1996 ===
Winter - Brandenburg Industrial Services, Inc. begins site remediation by removing buildings that are not architecturally or historically significant or structurally viable for new uses.

April - Bethlehem City Council approves zoning changes of the 163 acres (0.7 km^{2}) of land owned by Bethlehem Steel between the Minsi Trail and Fahy Bridges. The land, formerly zoned "heavy industrial," has been rezoned to permit a wide range of redevelopment projects.

April - Discovery Center of Science and Technology agrees to purchase former Bethlehem Plant office building to house an interactive museum for children.

December - Enterprise Development Company is named the master developer for the 163 acre (0.7 km^{2}) tract of land between the Minsi Trail and Fahy Bridges. The tract is now known as Bethlehem Works and will feature entertainment, cultural, recreational and retail establishments.

=== 1997 ===
February - Bethlehem Steel Corporation signs a memorandum of understanding with the Smithsonian Institution for the long-term loan of artifacts to be exhibited in a new museum, the National Museum of Industrial History, that will be affiliated with the Smithsonian.

August - Headquarters for the Bethlehem Works revitalization effort are now open at 530 East Third Street in Bethlehem that establish a presence for Enterprise Development Company, the project's master developer. The building, located across from the Discovery Center and the former Main Gate, gives Enterprise staff and visitors easy access to the Bethlehem Works' site.

November - The Master Plan for Bethlehem Works was reviewed with the community in a public meeting. The economic impact was revealed to be a $450 million investment that will create 2,500 full-time equivalent jobs and produce more than $20 million each year in tax revenue to local and state taxing authorities.

=== 1998 ===
Winter - Master plan approved by City of Bethlehem's Planning Commission following the plan's unveiling to the community in late 1997. Fall - Infrastructure improvement grants through the federal Transportation and Efficiency Act for the 21st century were authorized by the U.S. Congress. The Bethlehem Works project will receive $3 million for public access way improvements as work is ready to begin.

Fall - Funding for public infrastructure improvements for roadways leading to Bethlehem Works is included in the longer-range budget process of the Pennsylvania Department of Transportation. Local monies to match the anticipated PennDOT allocation are being pursued with the City of Bethlehem.

Fall - Bethlehem Steel is preparing a proposal for funding through a "brownfields" initiative from the U.S. Department of Housing and Urban Development to support infrastructure improvements.

=== 1999 ===
February - Industrial artifacts from the 19th century moved to Bethlehem on a long-term loan basis from the Smithsonian Institution to the National Museum of Industrial History. The Preview Center will be affiliated with the Smithsonian and will showcase artifacts that will be moved to the permanent 300,000 ft^{2} (28,000 m^{2}) museum that will have a planned opening in the plant's No. 2 machine shop in 2004. February - Designated developer is named for former headquarters building to become a 262-room, full-service hotel with an adjacent conference center. Castlebrook Development (formerly known as Wynco), a real estate development group located in Pittsburgh, is expected to partner with a national hotel chain under whose flag the hotel will operate.

April - Ground broken for the John M. Cook Technology Center-a 36,250 ft^{2} (3,368 m^{2}) post incubator facility for development of high-tech business start-ups.

June - Officials from the U.S. Environmental Protection Agency and the Pennsylvania Department of Environmental Protection approved the remediation plan for Bethlehem Works and called the 1,800 acre (7 km^{2}) Bethlehem Works and Bethlehem Commerce Center initiatives "a national model for brownfields development."

August - Designated developer is named for a family fun center to be known as "The Fundry at Bethlehem Works." James Lewis of Lewiston, N.Y., a developer of other family fun centers, plans up to 100,000 ft^{2} (9,000 m^{2}) of space in the existing carpenter shop and a new structure adjacent to the existing building.

November - Pennsylvania Governor Tom Ridge presents the Governor's Award for Environmental Excellence to Bethlehem Steel Corporation for its remediation process that will expedite the return of the Bethlehem Works property to productive use.

December - The City of Bethlehem's Planning Commission approved the subdivision plan and infrastructure improvements for Phase 1 of Bethlehem Works.

December - Pennsylvania Governor Tom Ridge presented $4.5 million to help build the Preview Center for the National Museum of Industrial History. The project was enabled in February 1998 when the General Assembly approved Governor Ridge's plan to fund vital community and economic development projects statewide.

=== 2000 ===
February - Letter of Designation is signed with Armada/Hoffler of Chesapeake, Va., to develop a multiplex cinema and up to 175,000 ft^{2} (16,000 m^{2}) of retail space.

April - Infrastructure funding in place to facilitate construction of roads and utility systems.

April - John M. Cook Technology Center opens adjacent to Bethlehem Works on land formerly owned by Bethlehem Steel. Cook Technology Center and neighboring Tech Center I, opened in 1993, house high-tech start-up businesses.

September - Bids for the infrastructure for the first phase of Bethlehem Works construction are being advertised by the city of Bethlehem.

November - Heralding "a new beginning for an old place" ground was broken for the installation of infrastructure for the first phase of Bethlehem Works.

=== 2001 ===
January - Business Facilities magazine has awarded Bethlehem Works and Commerce Center its Gold Award for innovation in redevelopment.

January - Armada/ Hoffler of Chesapeake, Va., has purchased six buildings on seven acres (28,000 m^{2}) for the construction of a multiplex cinema and up to 175,000 ft^{2} (16,000 m^{2}) of retail space.

February - Eleven restaurants will open at two different locations within Bethlehem Works. Three eateries/pubs will be part of the Fundry at Bethlehem Works and eight will be part of Armada/Hoffler's retail complex.

April - A third technology center will be established on Bethlehem Steel property to support the growth of high technology companies. The new building will comprise 60,000 ft^{2} (5,600 m^{2}) of floor space to open in 2002.

April - A purchase and sale agreement has been signed with Paramount Pavilion Group for 3.6 acres (15,000 m^{2}) of land to construct a 70,000 ft^{2} (6,500 m^{2}) dual indoor ice skating rink with an outdoor in-line skating area.

=== 2004 ===
September - New York investment group Bethworks Now purchase the Bethlehem Works site for an undisclosed sum, stating that it will follow much of the original development plan.

=== 2006 ===
October - Bethlehem City Council vote through zoning changes to allow a portion of the Bethlehem Works site to be used for gambling.
December - Bethlehem obtains a license from the Commonwealth of Pennsylvania to open a slots parlor on the BethWorks development site.

=== 2009 ===
Wind Creek Bethlehem opened on May 22, 2009.

=== 2011 ===
The Outlets at Wind Creek Bethlehem shopping mall opened on November 1, 2011 and connects the casino and the hotel.

== See also ==
- Minsi Trail Bridge
