= The Outlets at Wind Creek Bethlehem =

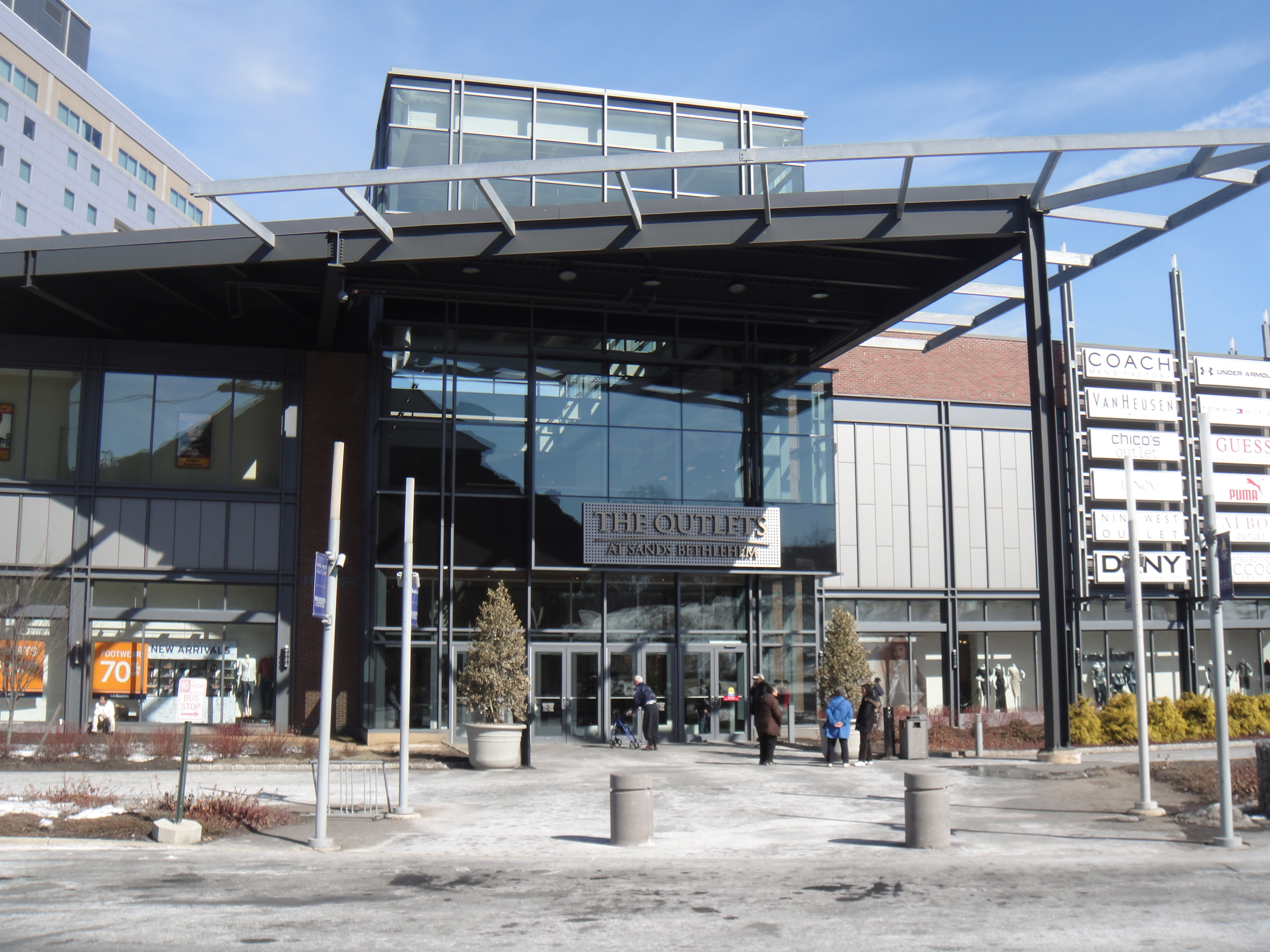
- Entrance to The Outlets at Wind Creek Bethlehem, March 2014
- Location: Bethlehem, Pennsylvania, U.S.
- Coordinates: 40.615027°N 75.356534°W
- Address: 77 Wind Creek Boulevard
- Opened: November 1, 2011
- Owner: Poarch Band of Creek Indians
- Num. of stores: 31
- Num. of anchor tenants: 0
- Floor area: 133,000 sq ft (12,400 m^{2})
- Floors: 2
- Parking: 4,700 spaces in Parking garage and surface parking lots
- Public transit: LANta bus: 102 and 215
- Website: outletsatwindcreekbethlehem.com

The Outlets at Wind Creek Bethlehem (formerly The Shoppes at Sands and The Outlets at Sands Bethlehem) is an indoor shopping mall that is located inside the Wind Creek Bethlehem casino resort in Bethlehem, Pennsylvania.

== History ==
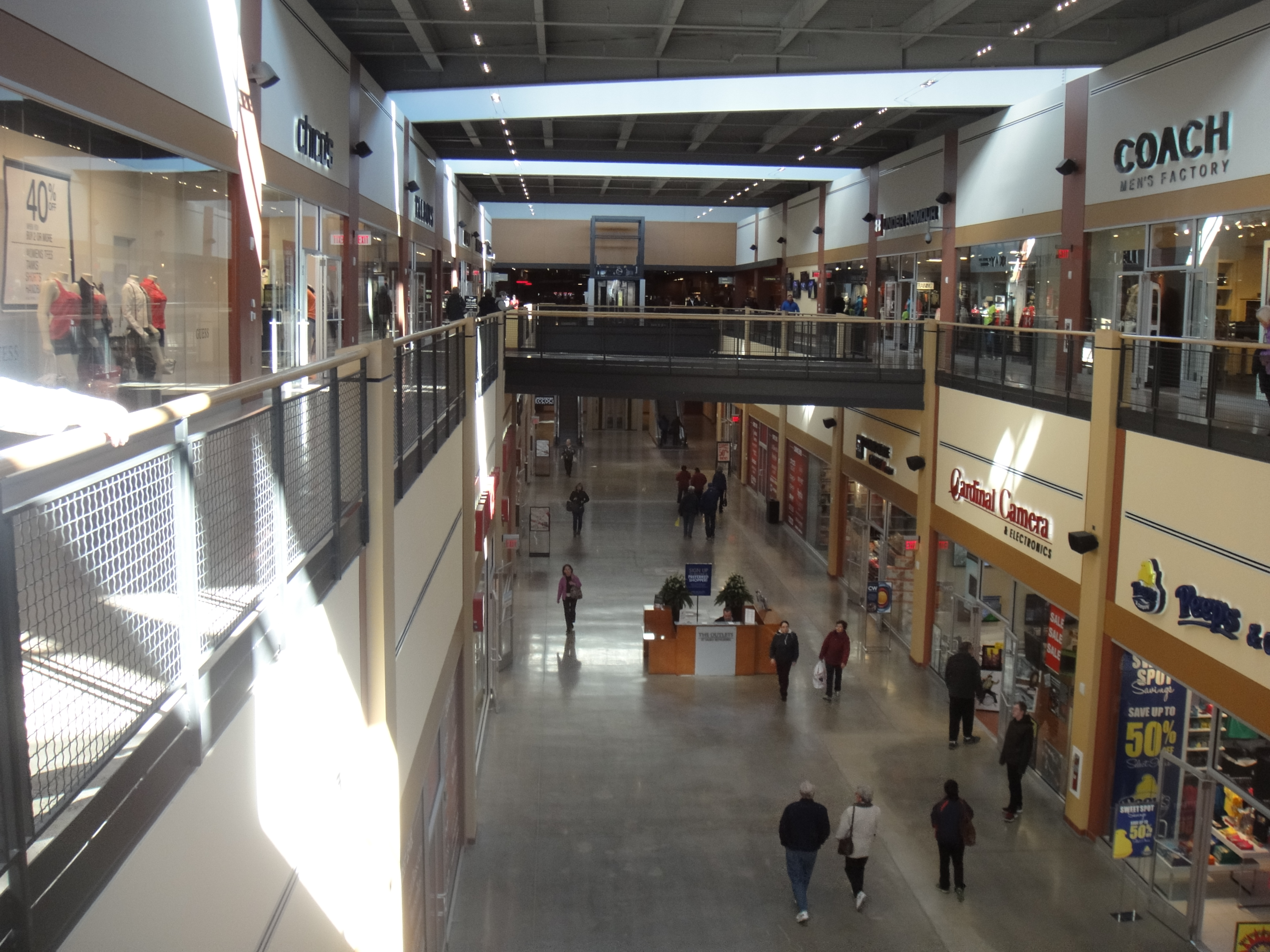
The Outlets at Wind Creek Bethlehem in Bethlehem, Pennsylvania, in March 2014

This mall opened on November 1, 2011 and connects the casino and the hotel. The outlet center is located under the Minsi Trail Bridge.

The Outlets at Wind Creek Bethlehem comprises 133,000 sq ft (12,400 m^{2}) of retail space. Retailers located there include clothing, electronics, household, jewelry, and specialty-item stores, as well as Europa Spa & Salon, Joli Bakery & Cafe, and Kids Quest/Cyber Quest - a childcare and family entertainment center. At the east end of the mall is a food court, next to the casino entrance.
