= Eugene Grace =

American businessman (1876–1960)

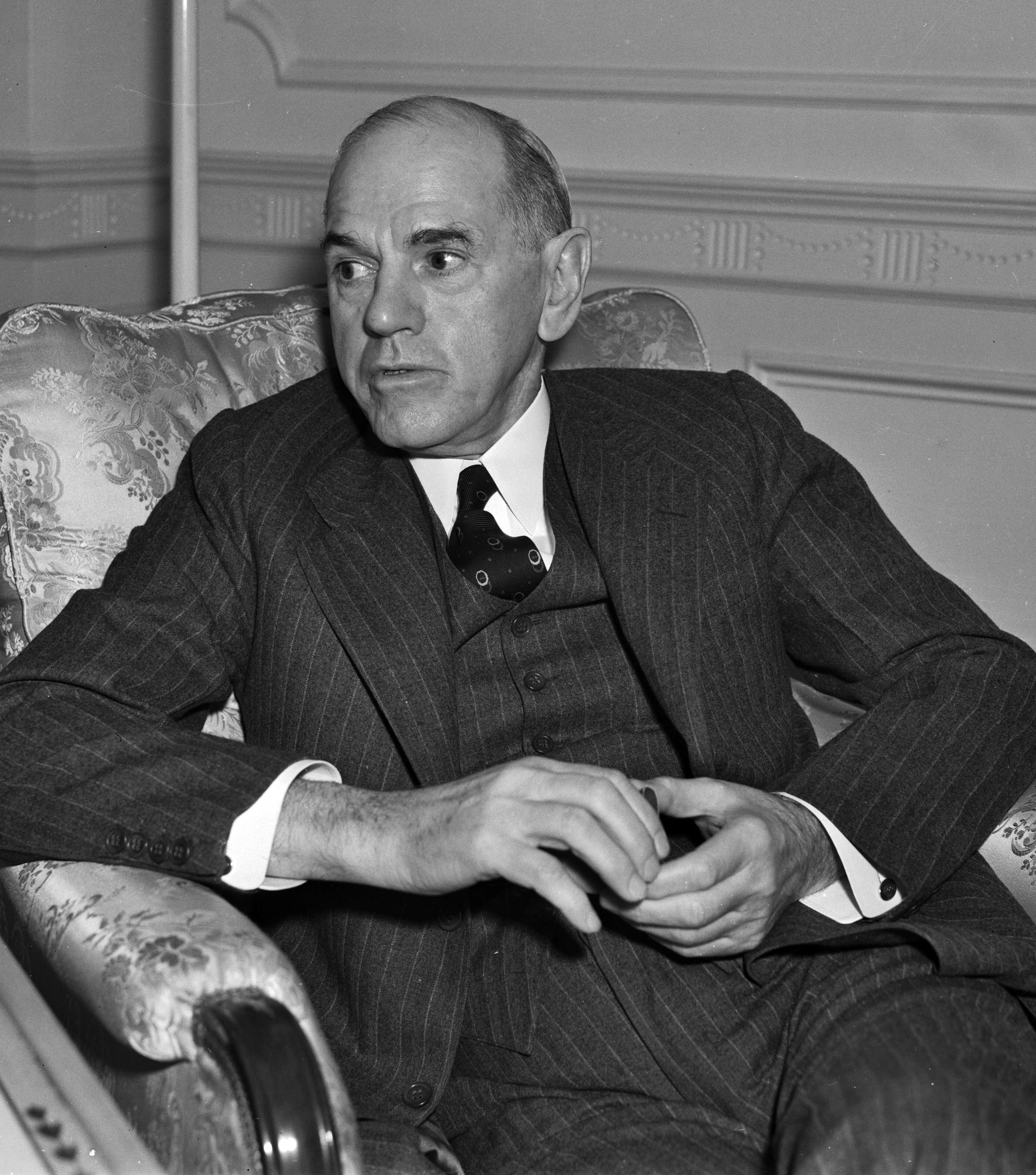
- Grace in December 1938
- Born: Eugene Gifford Grace; August 27, 1876; Cape May, New Jersey, U.S.
- Died: July 25, 1960 (aged 83); Bethlehem, Pennsylvania, U.S.
- Resting place: Nisky Hill Cemetery (South Bethlehem, Pennsylvania, U.S.)
- Education: Lehigh University (1899)
- Occupations: President, Bethlehem Steel
- Years active: 1916–1957
- Spouse: Marion Brown
- Parent(s): John W. Grace; Rebecca Grace

Eugene Gifford Grace (August 27, 1876 – July 25, 1960) was the president of Bethlehem Steel from 1916 to 1945, and chairman of the board from 1945 until his retirement in 1957. He also served as president of the American Iron and Steel Institute, and sat on the board of trustees for Lehigh University.

== Early life and education ==
Grace was born in Cape May, New Jersey, the son of a sea captain John W. Grace, and Rebecca Grace. He married Marion Brown, daughter of Charles Brown, co-founder of the Brown-Borhek lumber supply company.

He attended Lehigh University in Bethlehem, Pennsylvania, and played for the university's college baseball team. He was considered to be one of their best players, playing shortstop and batting a .400 average. He graduated at the top of his class as valedictorian in 1899.

== Career ==
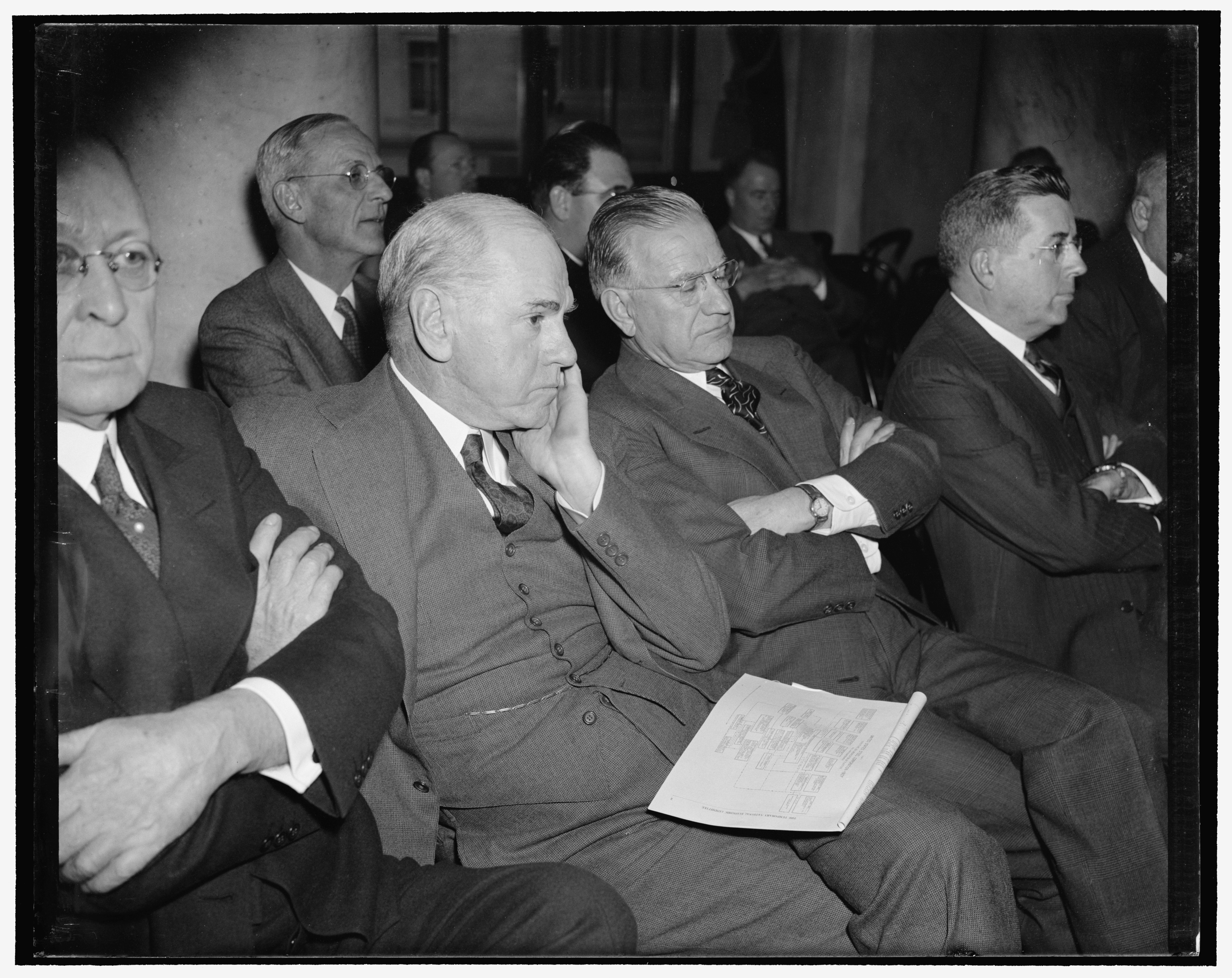
Grace (with hand on face) testifying before Congress in November 1955

After graduating from Lehigh University, Grace was offered a professional baseball contract from the Boston Braves, which he turned down to work as a crane operator for Bethlehem Steel.

Grace led the company through World War I, tripling the company's steel output over the course of the war. By 1929, through several acquisitions, the company operated nine major steel plants. He is quoted as saying "Gentlemen, we are going to make a lot of money." when informed of the outbreak of World War II in 1939. He was right, as Bethlehem Steel quickly became one of the major steel suppliers of the war, as well as constructing many ships for the United States Navy. The company constructed 1,127 ships for the U.S. military during the war years. In 1941, he received the second highest salary and compensation package in the U.S., $522,637, equal to $11,440,075 today. During his career, Grace earned a reputation for strident anti-unionism.

After World War I, Grace led the company to retool for peace time, and they changed focus to building bridges, including the Verrazzano–Narrows Bridge, and skyscrapers. Grace was generous with the money he earned, and donated much to Lehigh University and the city of Bethlehem. He retired from the company in 1957.

== Death ==
He died on July 25, 1960 in Bethlehem, Pennsylvania at age 83. He is interred in Nisky Hill Cemetery, which overlooks the now defunct Bethlehem Steel plant's smokestacks and vacant manufacturing buildings in South Bethlehem.

== Legacy ==
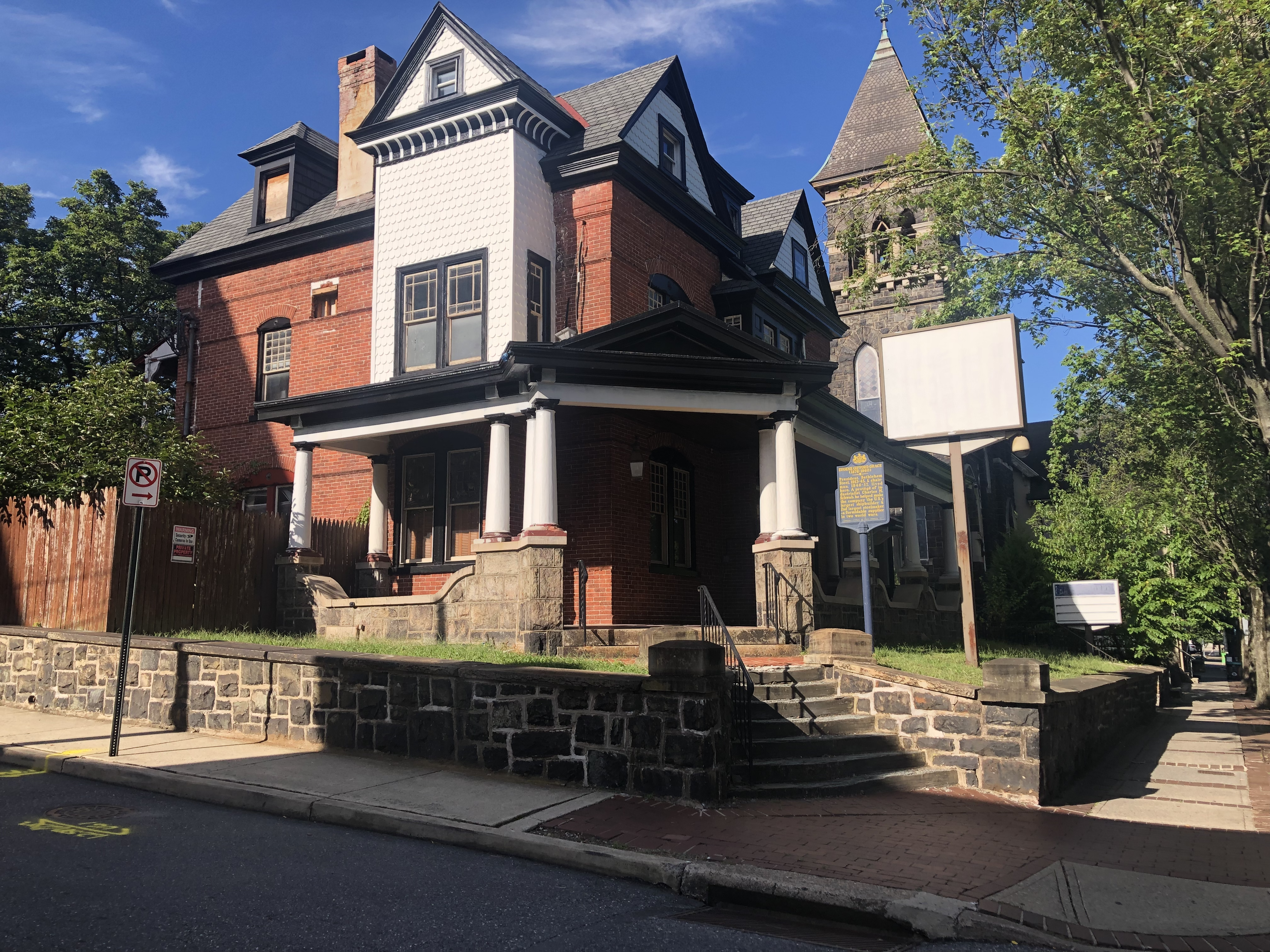
Grace's house in Southside Bethlehem

In 1997 Grace's house in Southside Bethlehem was named a historic landmark by the Pennsylvania Historical and Museum Commission, and a plaque was installed commemorating his contributions to the United States steel industry.
