= Wind Creek Bethlehem =

Hotel and casino in Bethlehem, Pennsylvania

Coordinates: 40.6148°N 75.3591°W

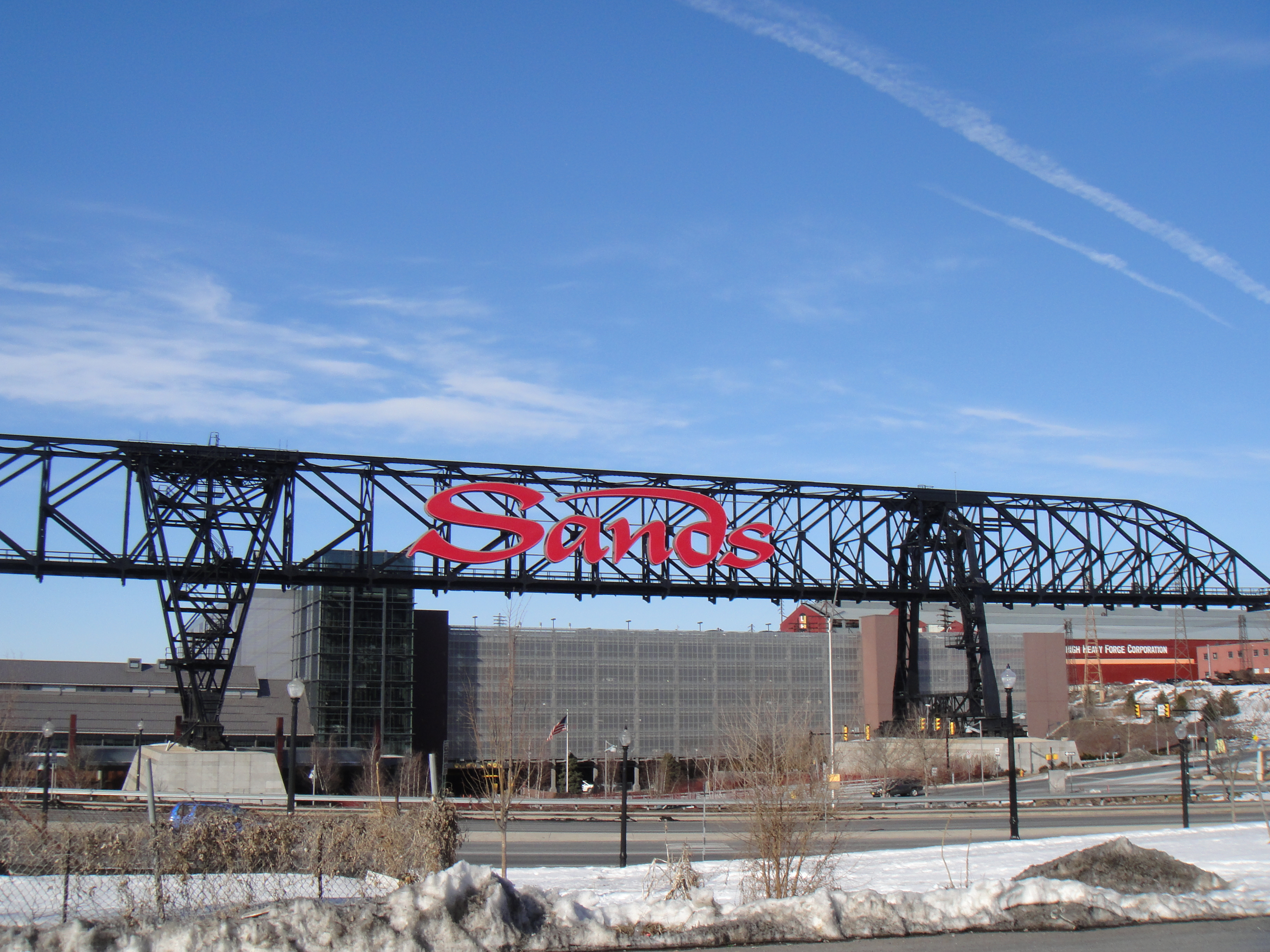
- The former Sands logo visible on an old Bethlehem Steel ore crane at Wind Creek Bethlehem
- Interactive map of Wind Creek Bethlehem
- Location: 77 Wind Creek Blvd Bethlehem, Pennsylvania 18015-7705
- Opened: May 22, 2009; 17 years ago
- Theme: Industrial
- No. of rooms: 302
- Gaming space: 139,000 sq ft (12,900 m^{2})
- Signature attractions: The Outlets at Wind Creek Bethlehem; Wind Creek Event Center
- Notable restaurants: The Chop House
- Casino type: Land-based
- Owner: Poarch Band of Creek Indians
- Architect: RTKL Associates
- Previous names: Sands BethWorks (planning/construction); Sands Casino Resort Bethlehem (2009–19)
- Renovated in: Casino floor expansion (late 2009–2010), Hotel (early 2011), Shopping mall (late 2011–2012)
- Website: Casino Website

The Wind Creek Bethlehem, formerly Sands Casino Resort Bethlehem, is a casino hotel located in the Bethlehem Works development site in Bethlehem, Pennsylvania, in the Lehigh Valley region of eastern Pennsylvania. It is owned and operated by Wind Creek Hospitality, an entity of the Poarch Band of Creek Indians.

== History ==
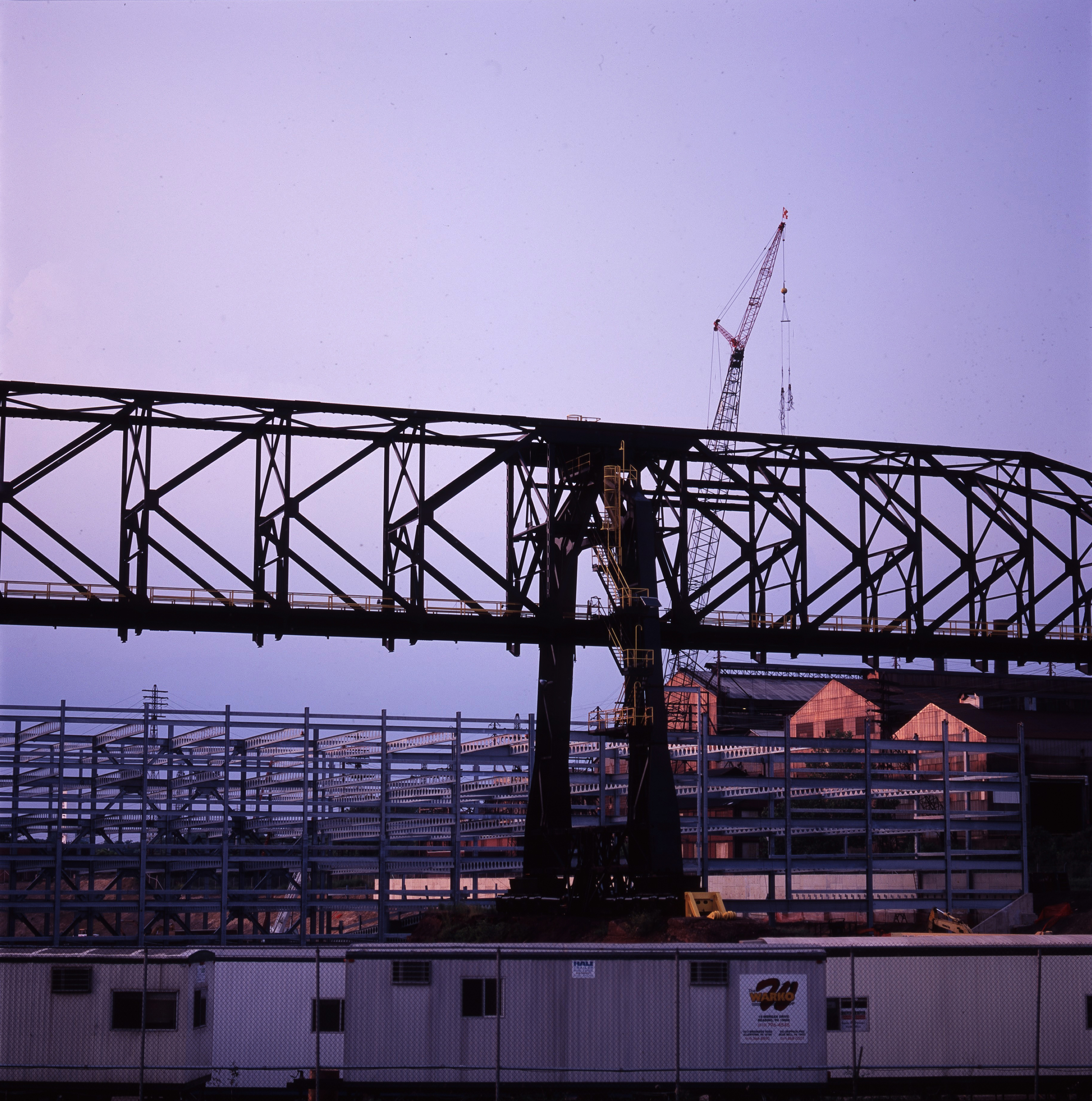
Construction of the casino on the now defunct Bethlehem Steel manufacturing site in 2008

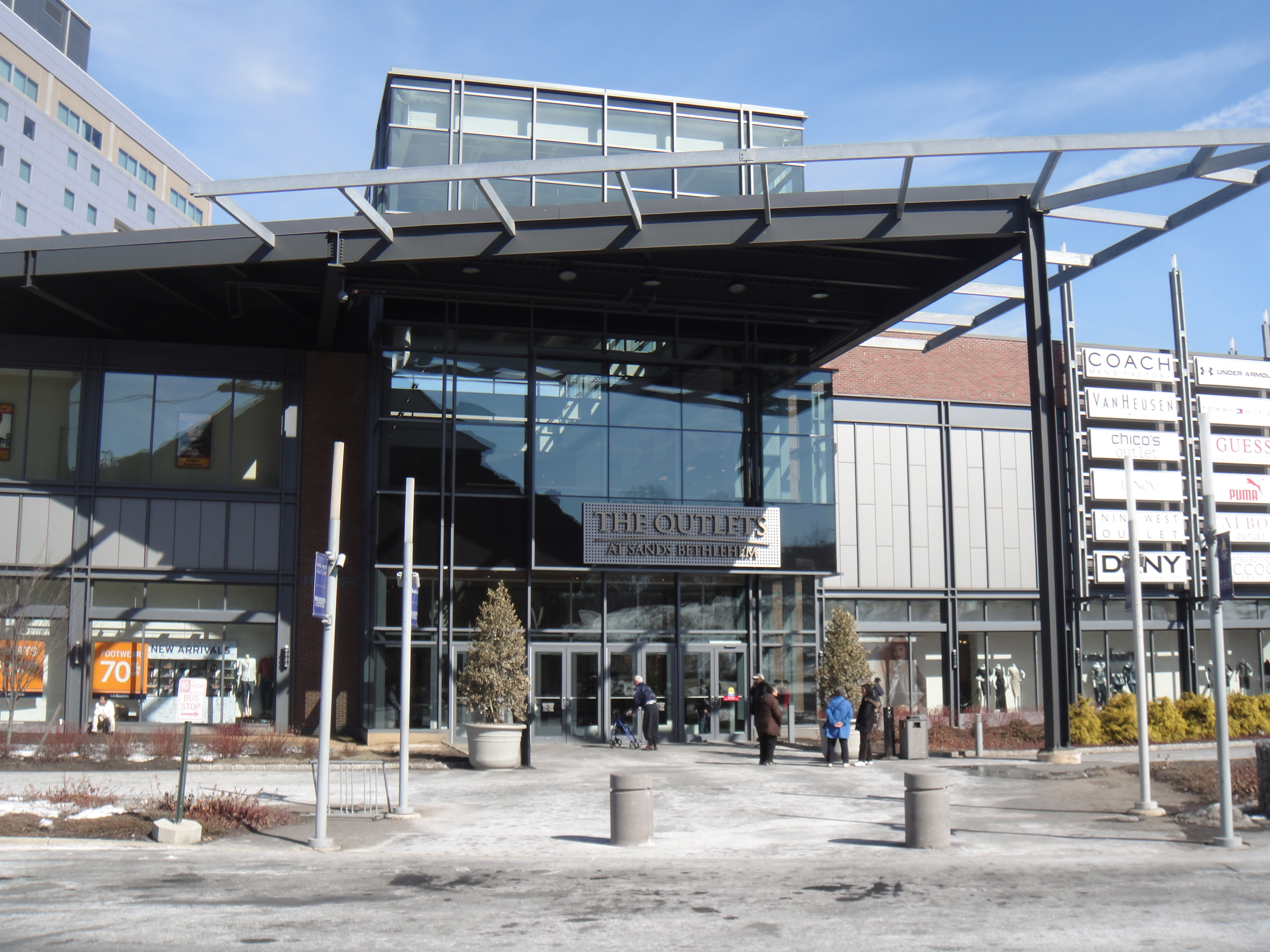
The Outlets at Wind Creek Bethlehem, which opened at Wind Creek Bethlehem in 2011

Wind Creek Bethlehem is one of the original five stand-alone casinos that were awarded slots licenses by the Pennsylvania Gaming Control Board on December 20, 2006. It was developed by the Las Vegas Sands corporation. The casino was slated to open in July 2008, but demolition took longer than expected due to the heavy concrete foundations of the old steel building. Its opening was delayed until the second quarter of 2009. The first concrete for the complex, which is located on the former Bethlehem Steel land on the south side of the city, was poured on November 15, 2007.

It opened on May 22, 2009. While the Las Vegas Sands owned several properties, this was the only casino in the United States to carry the Sands brand in its name, since the original Sands Hotel and Casino in Las Vegas was demolished in 1996 and replaced with The Venetian, and the Sands Atlantic City, which carried the Sands name under naming license despite not being owned by Las Vegas Sands was closed in 2006 and demolished the following year.

In the winter of 2009–2010, the casino was granted a license for table games which allowed the casino to expand to include 180 table games, including poker, blackjack and craps. Table games began operation on July 18, 2010. The Sands Hotel opened on May 27, 2011.

Following the addition of table games, the casino has become a popular destination for Asian Americans from New York City, who frequently travel to the casino on motorcoach buses operated by Chinatown bus lines. More than 3,000 riders a day traveled by bus to the casino from Asian American neighborhoods in New York City. The casino has the busiest motorcoach business of any casino in Pennsylvania.

Sands had offered $45 in free play vouchers for slot machines to riders who paid $15 for a bus ticket. This offer led to the creation of an underground market where Asian American bus riders from New York City, often low-income or homeless people, would sell their free play vouchers upon arriving at the casino and would loiter in Bethlehem for the day before returning by bus to New York City. Casino patrons would buy the free play vouchers in bulk at a discount and use them in the video poker machines, which have a lower house advantage, and attempt to make a profit. On March 31, 2014, in an effort to end this practice, the video poker machines at Sands stopped accepting the free play vouchers given to bus riders.

It was the only property in the company to end 2014 with a profit, doing better than Sands' Vegas and Asia properties.

In November 2016, a planned expansion of the gaming floor, along with two additional restaurants was announced.

In March 2018, it was announced that the property would be sold to Wind Creek Hospitality for $1.3 billion. Wind Creek Hospitality had plans for a $190-million expansion to the property that would add a 300-room hotel and possibly an indoor water park. The sale was completed in May 2019, and the property was renamed as Wind Creek Bethlehem in July 2019.

On June 10, 2020, Wind Creek Bethlehem was granted approval from the Pennsylvania Gaming Control Board to offer sports betting. Construction of the sportsbook at Wind Creek Bethlehem, which is operated by Betfred and located at the site of Buddy V's Ristorante, began around August 18, 2020 and opened on November 18, 2020. The casino resort temporarily closed from March to June 2020 and again from December 2020 to January 2021 due to the COVID-19 pandemic. Some games were made available online.

== Wind Creek Event Center ==
Wind Creek Event Center was designed by Howard Kulp Architects of Salisbury Township. The event center features 14,000 sq ft (1,300 m^{2}) of flexible multipurpose space, which accommodates meetings, conventions, and a variety of entertainment events. The venue can house 3,800 in a general admission setting and 2,500 in a reserved seating setting. Operated by Vision Entertainment Group, it was opened on May 16, 2012 as the Sands Bethlehem Event Center, with a concert by Incubus. Janet Jackson performed to a sold-out crowd at the venue in November 2017 for her State of the World Tour. Britney Spears performed at the venue in July 2018 on her Piece of Me Tour.

== Facilities ==
=== Gaming ===
The casino features over 3,000 slot machines, 200 table games, several electronic table games, and sports betting. Sands spent $26 million in 2009 to add 119 table games: 41 blackjack tables, four craps, four roulette, four three-card poker, 14 mini-baccarat, four midi-baccarat, three pai gow poker, two pai gow tiles, one Big Six, two Let It Ride, two Caribbean stud, four Texas Hold'em Bonus, one Casino War, one sic bo and 12 poker tables. Later, a 30-table poker room was built off of the main floor. Table games began operation on July 18, 2010. The sportsbook at Wind Creek Bethlehem, which is operated by Betfred and opened on November 18, 2020, has 79 TV screens, 13 self-serve sports betting kiosks, and eight teller windows. Wind Creek Bethlehem also offers online sports betting.

=== Dining ===
- Moe’s Southwest Grill
- Urban Table
- Chopstick
- Croissanterie
- The Chop House
- Steelworks Buffet & Grill
- The Market Gourmet Express Food Court, currently including:
  - Bananas
  - Casa Java
  - Far East
  - GreenLeafs
  - Mo Burger
  - South Philly Steaks & Fries
  - Starbucks
  - Villa Italian Kitchen

=== Nightlife ===
- Molten
- Coil Lounge
- Vision Bar

=== Shopping ===
The Outlets at Wind Creek Bethlehem is an indoor shopping mall that connects the casino and the hotel. The outlet center, which opened on November 1, 2011 and is located under the Minsi Trail Bridge, comprises 133,000 sq ft (12,400 m^{2}) of retail space and includes a food court, near the casino entrance.

== Events ==
=== Lehigh Valley Food and Wine Festival ===
The hotel hosts the yearly Lehigh Valley Food & Wine Festival, held at the end of May/early June to benefit the culinary and hospitality program at Northampton Community College.
