= South Bethlehem Downtown Historic District =

Historic district in Pennsylvania, United States

- U.S. National Register of Historic Places
- U.S. Historic district
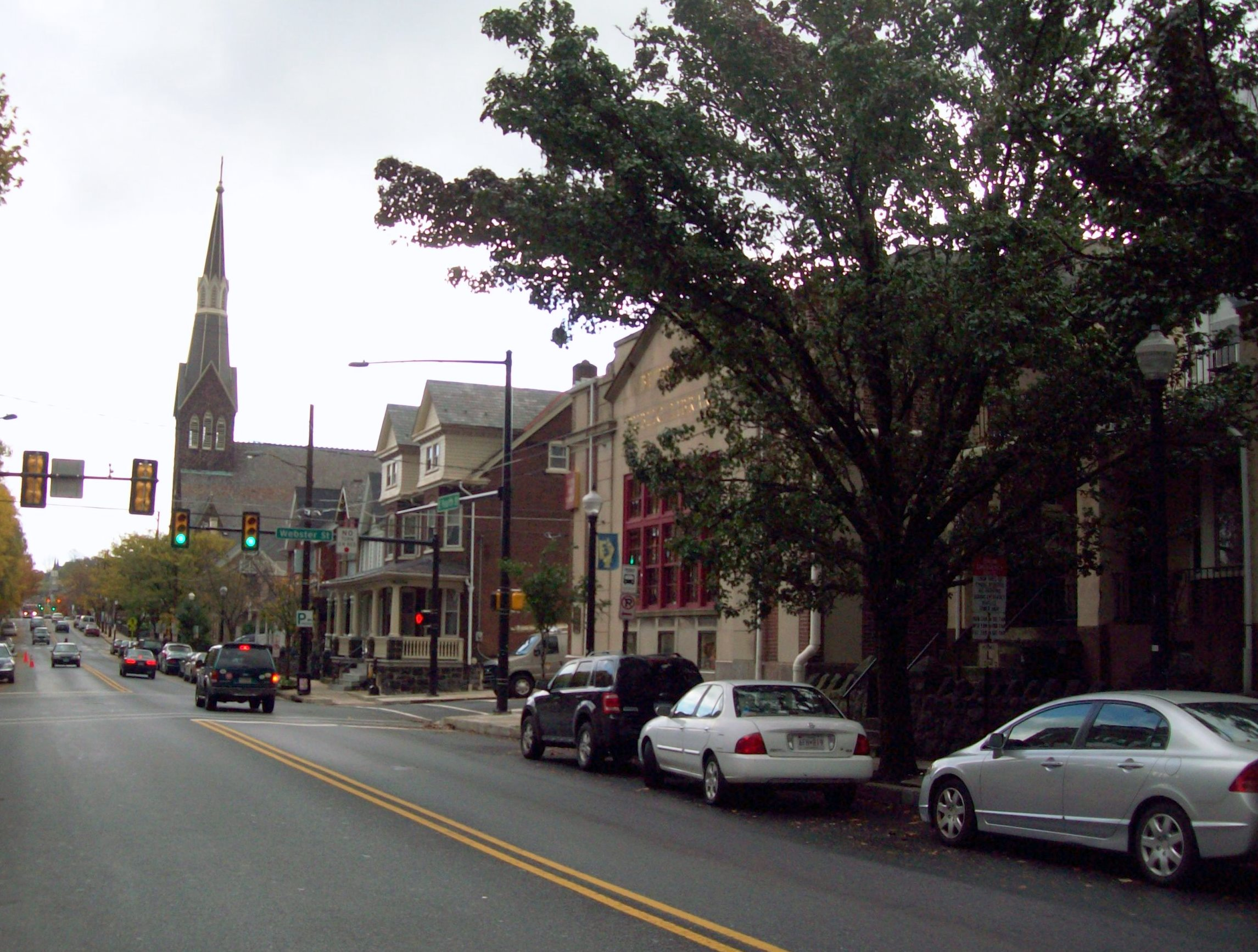
- South Bethlehem Downtown Historic District in October 2011

- Location within Pennsylvania Location within the United States
- Location: Roughly bounded by Wyandotte, Columbia, Hayes, and Morton St., Bethlehem, Pennsylvania
- Coordinates: 40°36′45″N 75°22′30″W
- Area: 74 acres (30 ha)
- Built: 1917
- Architect: Leh, A.W.; et al.
- Architectural style: Gothic, Italianate
- NRHP reference No.: 05001500
- Added to NRHP: January 3, 2006

The South Bethlehem Downtown Historic District, commonly referred to as South Bethlehem, is a national historic district that is located in Bethlehem in Northampton County, Pennsylvania.

The district was added to the National Register of Historic Places in 2005.

== History and architectural features ==
This district includes 288 contributing buildings and two contributing objects. It encompasses a concentration of late-nineteenth through early twentieth-century commercial, municipal, industrial and residential buildings. Most of them date from circa 1900 to 1935.

Notable non-residential buildings include several Bethlehem Steel-related buildings, the South Bethlehem Post Office (1916), Bethlehem Public Library (1929), the Protection Firehouse (Touchstone Theater, 1875), the E.P. Wilbur Trust Building (1910), Holy Infancy Catholic Church (1892), St. John Windish Lutheran Church (1910), Windish Hall (c. 1915), and the Banana Factory (c. 1900).

The district was added to the National Register of Historic Places in 2005.

== Properties ==
=== Protection Firehouse ===
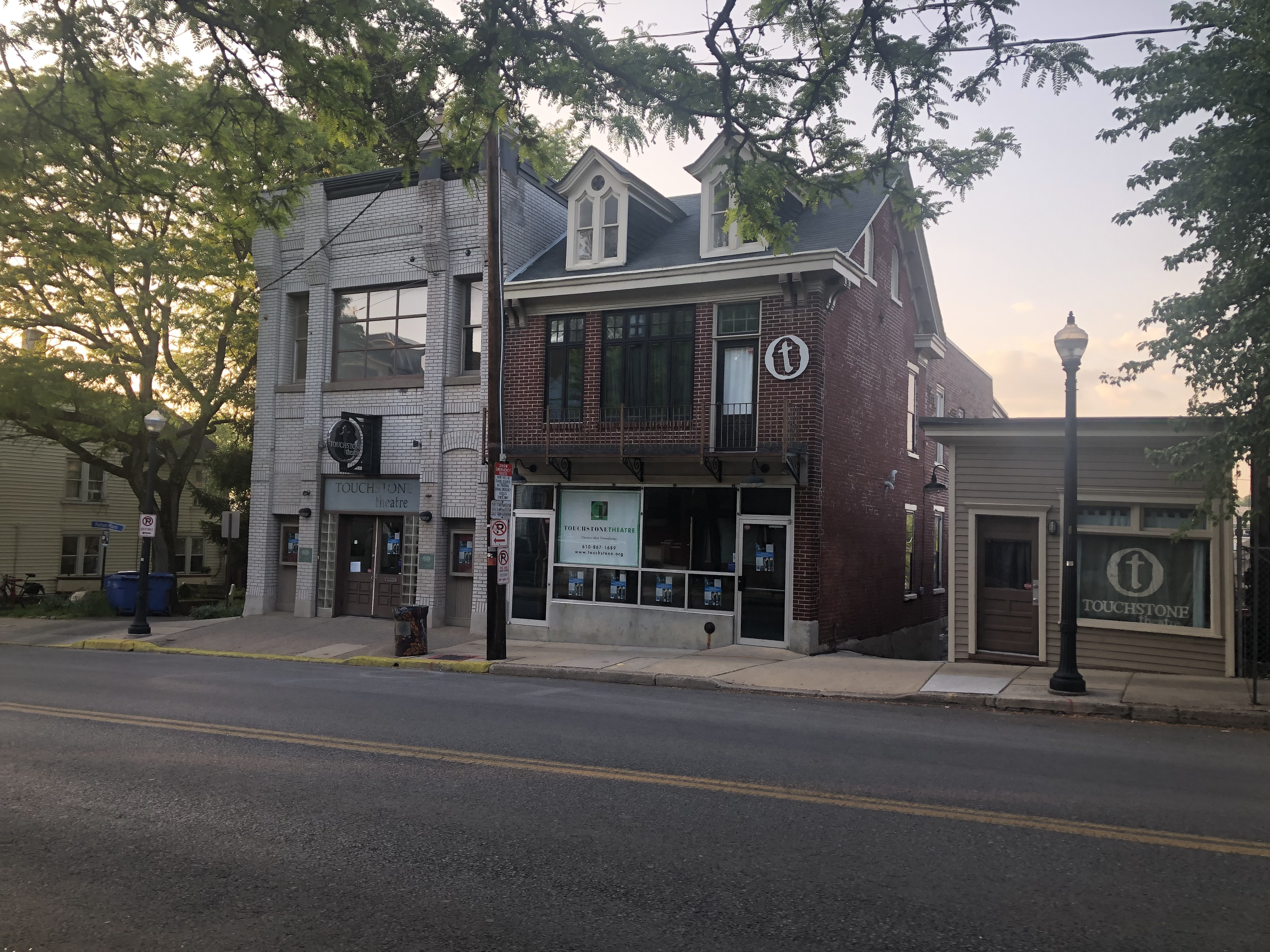
Touchstone Theater, formerly Protection Firehouse

Built in 1875, the Protection Firehouse served as Southside Bethlehem's original fire station. Due to the growth of the neighborhood and the limited size of the station, however, it was replaced and then stood abandoned until 1967 when it was purchased by Robert Thompson and turned into a youth center.

On Wednesday, August 5, 1970, the center became the site of a Drive-by shooting and attempted firebombing. The firebomb was thrown into a crowd of twenty, but failed to detonate. Gunfire killed fourteen-year-old Rosemarie Parham and seriously injured sixteen-year-old Carlos Garcia.

The firehouse was abandoned until it was purchased by the touchstone theater in 1987 and renovated into a seventy-two-seat theater. Touchstone had been founded six years earlier, in 1981, by Bill and Bridget George and Lorraine Zeller, alumni from Lehigh University, and was inspired by the University's improv group to provide bilingual and multi-racial performances to bridge ethnic divisions. As of September 2026 Touchstone operates out of the Protection Firehouse.

=== St. John Windish Lutheran Church and Windish Hall ===
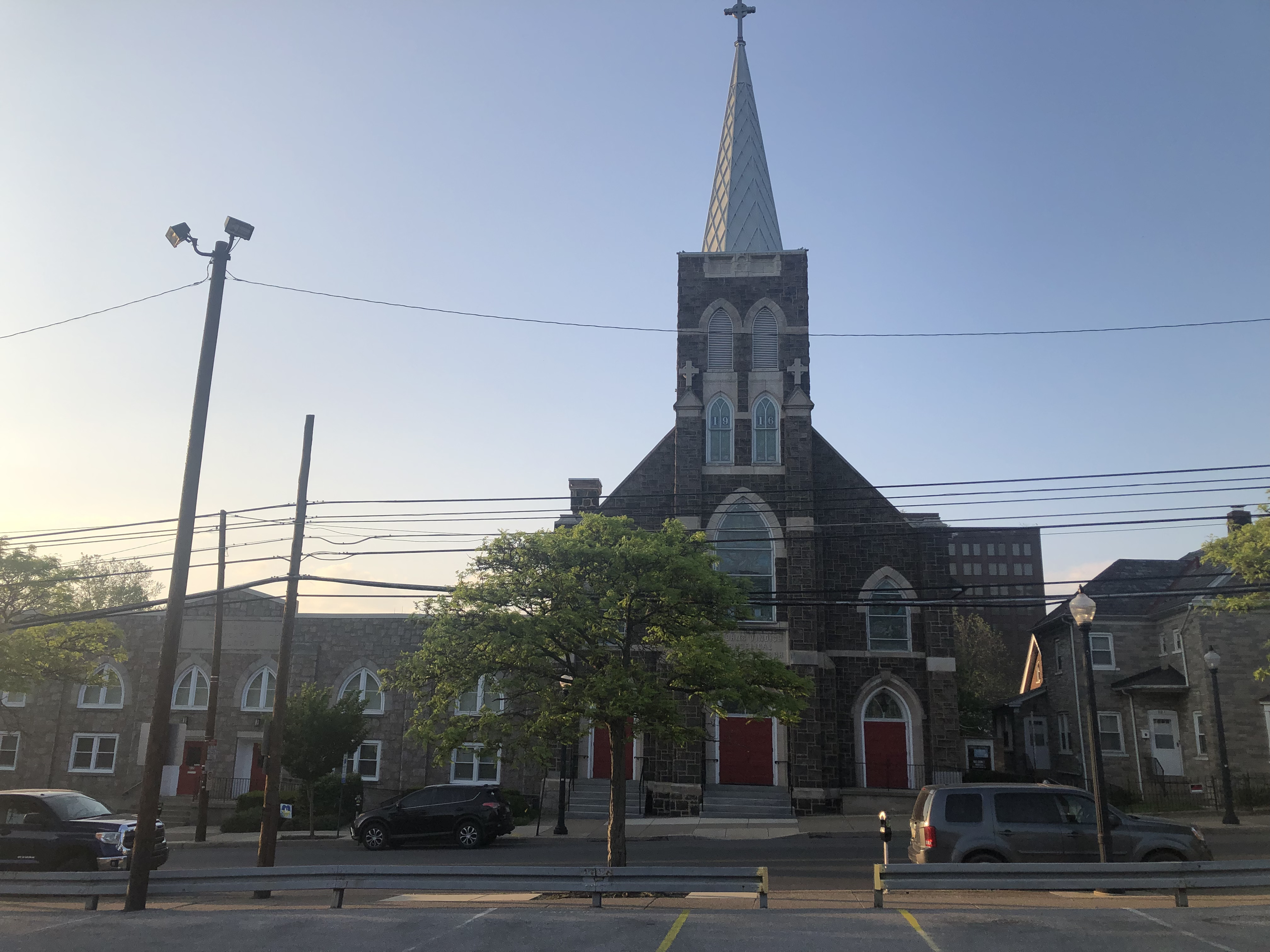
St. John's Windish Lutheran Church (center-right) and Windish Hall (adjoined, left)

At the turn of the twentieth century, a number of Slovenes from Prekmurje immigrated to South Bethlehem to escape ethnic persecution, with another large group arriving after fleeing the collapse of Austria-Hungary in 1918. Seeking employment in the city's steel mills and other factories, they became known by locals as "Windish," after an entirely unrelated Slavic group in northern Germany, the Wends. The vast majority of these new immigrants were Evangelical Lutherans; they founded St. John's Windish Lutheran Church in 1910 and built an adjoined school, the Windish Hall, in 1915.

The Slovene community in Bethlehem suffered a major decline after the shuttering of the steel mill in 1982. In 2023, after more than a century of operation, the leadership of St. John's determined that the church could no longer continue to serve the community and made the decision to merge with St. Peters Evangelical Lutheran Church and the Light of Christ Lutheran Church, and then sell the three churches after finding a new venue where their combined congregations could meet.

The two parties that were interested in buying the three churches were Lehigh University and the municipal government of Bethlehem. The city's effort, spearheaded by mayor J. William Reynolds, sought to purchase, and then demolish the churches and turn them into parking lots for the Bethlehem Parking authority. Despite the $3.75 million offer from the city, church leaders did not initially accept the offer. The university then matched the city's offer, and the churches accepted after university leaders promised they would not convert the churches into student housing. A final service in St. Johns was held on April 23, 2023.

=== Grace House ===
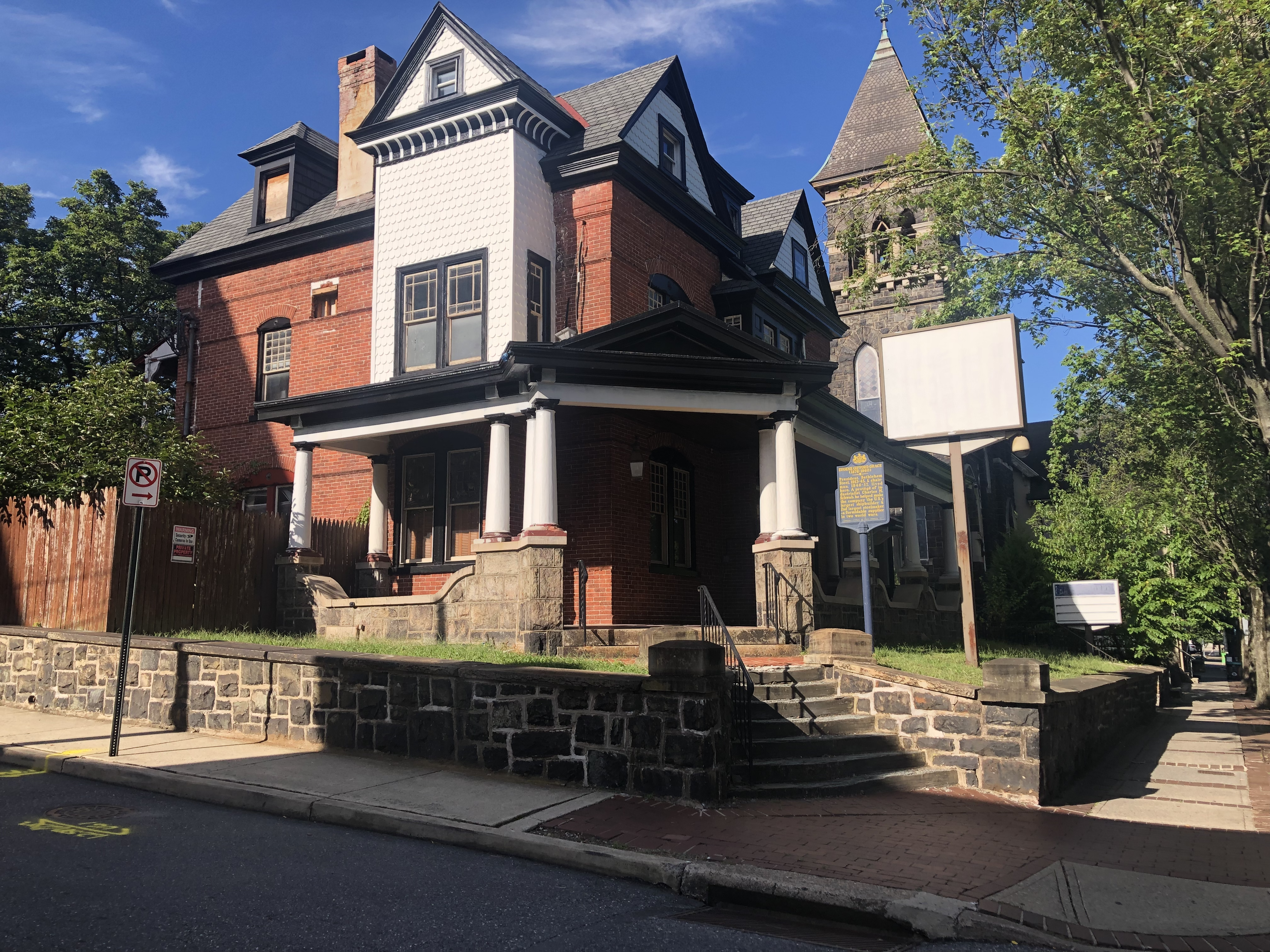
Grace house and landmark plaque

A notable residential property named a historic landmark in its own right by the Pennsylvania Historical and Museum Commission, the 3,000 square foot mansion was formerly owned by Eugene Grace, President of Bethlehem Steel from 1916 to 1945. Often described as "the other Grace House" in reference to Grace's far more famous mansion in West Bethlehem, which he named Uwchlan, the mansion stood apart from the small row houses around it for workers at Bethlehem Steel, and was named a landmark in 1997. However, between Grace selling the mansion and its naming of a landmark, a garage in the rear, and a one story addition to the west was added.

The property had served as a commercial property after Grace sold it, although records on the exact tenets is unclear at certain points. The property was used for apartments, a doctor’s office, possibly a funeral home and a pizzeria "Anna Mia" for over a decade, closing in 2017 when the owner moved to a new location in Hanover Township.

Sarah and Wesley Jun purchased the building in 2004 and converted it back into a residential property in 2018, but also sought to sell the site to developers. Initially, developer Robin Reshetar sought to demolish the addition and garage, restore the original mansion, and construct a five story apartment complex around the mansion, enveloping it on three sides. This proposal was rejected by the Bethlehem City Council for clashing with the Historic District's architecture, as well as surpassing the four story limit for new construction in the district.

The couple ended up selling the property to Lehigh University graduate Dallas Basha for $485,000. Basha proposed renovations to the crumbling exterior and turning the interior into leased space. Namely two offices and four apartments. The renovations were set to start in 2019, but were postponed indefinitely due to the COVID-19 pandemic and no new information has been made public since 2018.
