= Minsi Trail Bridge =

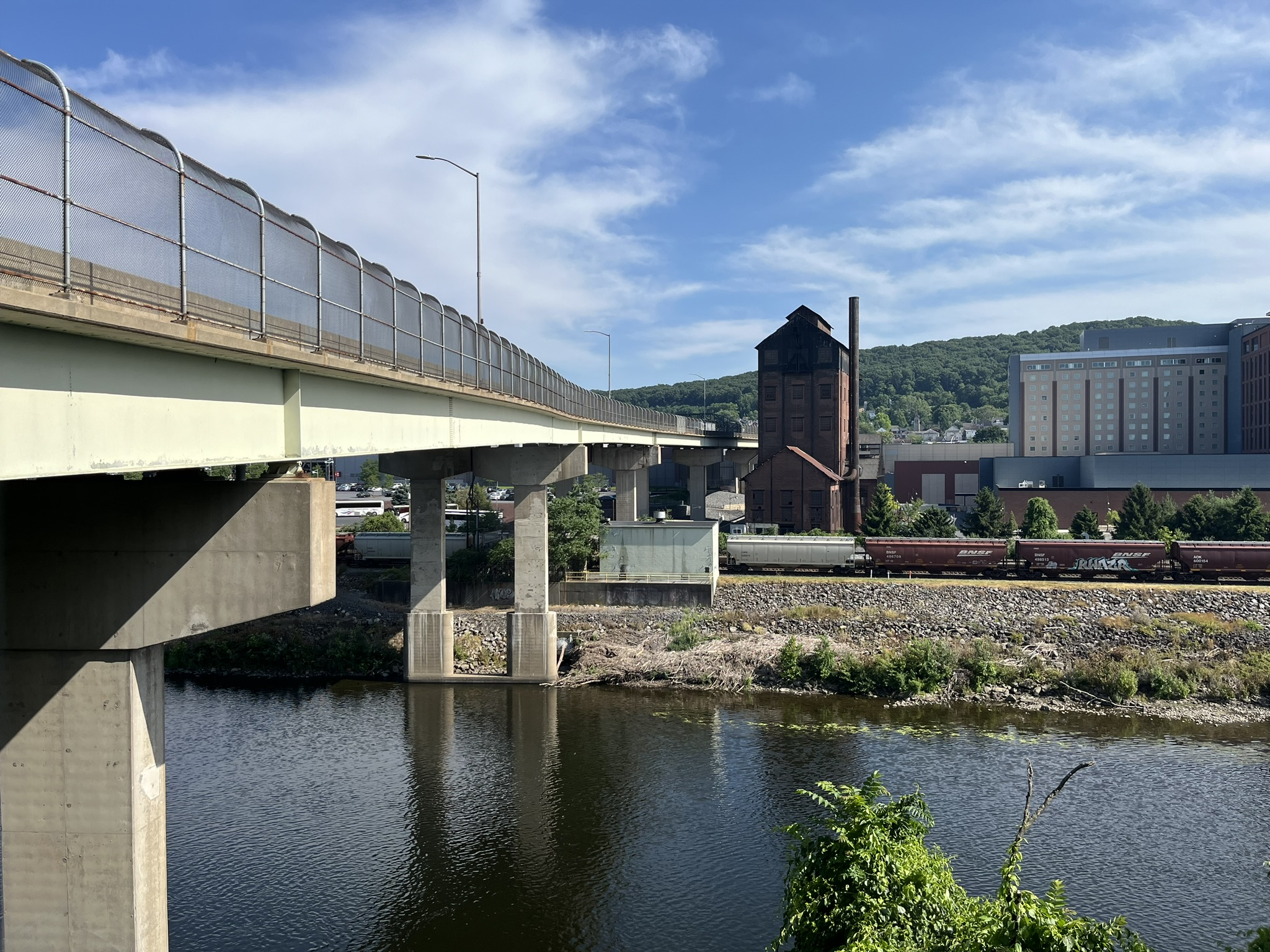
- The Minsi Trail Bridge, facing South Bethlehem
- Coordinates: 40°37′03″N 75°21′31″W
- Carries: 4 lanes of Stefko Blvd. and 2 sidewalks
- Crosses: Lehigh River
- Locale: East Side Bethlehem to South Side Bethlehem), Pennsylvania, U.S.
- Official name: Minsi Trail Bridge
- Other name(s): Stefko Boulevard Bridge

Characteristics
- Total length: 3,000 feet

Statistics
- Toll: Free

The Minsi Trail Bridge is a bridge in Bethlehem, Pennsylvania, which crosses the Lehigh River. It carries four lanes of Stefko Boulevard.

== History ==
The bridge was originally built during the early days of the Bethlehem Steel in the beginning of the 20th century. It was reconstructed in 1984, and the old bridge was demolished the following year, in 1985. The bridge's name is taken from a Native American route.

== Route ==
Minsi Trail Bridge begins at Daly Avenue in South Side Bethlehem and continues north to East Market Street. On the South Side, it runs past the former Bethlehem Steel plant and over the Wind Creek Bethlehem casino resort.
