= Legal aid in the United States =

Legal aid in the United States is the provision of assistance to people who are unable to afford legal representation and access to the court system in the United States. In the US, legal aid provisions are different for criminal law and civil law. Criminal legal aid with legal representation is guaranteed to defendants under criminal prosecution (related to the charges) who cannot afford to hire an attorney. Civil legal aid is not guaranteed under federal law, but is provided by a variety of public interest law firms and community legal clinics for free (pro bono) or at reduced cost. Other forms of civil legal aid are available through federally-funded legal services, pro bono lawyers, and private volunteers.

== Criminal legal aid ==
Before 1932, there was no mechanism for legal aid for criminal defendants. Modern criminal legal aid developed from a series of landmark court decisions throughout the 1900s. In Powell v. Alabama, nine black youths from Alabama, also known as the "Scottsboro Boys", were not appointed counsel during a 1932 sexual assault case. Two white females, Victoria Price and Ruby Bates, claimed that these men raped them, bringing them to court. During trial however, testimony and evidence from the medical examination of these women refuted the rape charges. Although they faced capital punishment, the "Scottsboro Boys" did not have the opportunity to see an attorney. Most were illiterate, and none had any knowledge of criminal law. All criminal defendants, except for one, were sentenced to death.

Eventually, the case reached the U.S. Supreme Court, where in a vote of 7-2, the Court overruled the conviction of the "Scottsboro Boys". The Court stated the trial court's actions denied them the right to counsel in criminal cases under the Sixth Amendment. This case marked the first time that the Court reversed a state court conviction because there was a failure to appoint counsel.

The Supreme Court clarified Powell in Betts v. Brady (1942). Betts concerned a criminal defendant indicted for robbery in Maryland. However, he could not afford counsel and requested one, which was ultimately denied by the trial judge. The majority in Betts reasoned that individual states assigning counsel to indigent defendants was not required unless there are special circumstances like being illiterate or mentally challenged. Instead, the Court considered Powell's holding to apply only in federal courts. Therefore, denying the defendant's request did not violate the Fourteenth Amendment Equal Protection Clause.

In 1963, Gideon v. Wainwright reconsidered the Betts decision. Gideon was charged with breaking and entering, a felony under Florida law. He appeared at trial without an attorney and requested for one, but was denied by the judge. Despite representing himself during trial, the jury found Gideon guilty and sentenced him to five years. He eventually appealed to the U.S. Supreme Court where the Court asserted that criminal defendants have the fundamental right to counsel in all cases, without regard for financial circumstances. They unanimously found that the Sixth Amendment right to counsel for defendants is "fundamental and essential to fair trials" in the United States, noting that "any person … who is too poor to hire a lawyer, cannot be assured a fair trial unless counsel is provided for him."

These landmark cases led to the creation of public defenders at the state and federal level. Today, the federal government and some states have public defender offices who represent indigent defendants—people who cannot afford attorney fees. At the federal level, there are over 80 federal defender organizations, while at the state level there are over 500 local defender offices. While public defenders receive funding from the government, they must remain ethically bound and independent at all times when handling cases.

== Civil legal aid ==
Unlike in criminal court, the United States federal government does not recognize a right to representation for those accused of civil offenses. This leaves a gap in access to attorneys, since the government will not appoint one even if you cannot afford it. As a result civil legal aid programs have emerged in order to provide free or affordable legal services to those who may lack access otherwise. Civil legal aid is run through both federally funded programs and pro bono, private organizations. However, the United States government specifically limits who federally funded legal aid organizations can represent, especially in the case of immigration status. Discussions and debates surrounding civil legal aid are shaped by this question of who truly deserves a right to representation.

Legal aid for civil cases is currently provided by a variety of public interest law firms and community legal clinics, who often have "legal aid" or "legal services" in their names. Public interest practice emerged from the goal of promoting access to equal justice for the poor and this was inspired from the legal services disparity amongst European immigrants. Such firms may impose income and resource ceilings as well as restrictions on the types of cases they will take, due to the sheer volume of potential clients and the general lack of funding for such work. Additionally, federally funded legal aid programs face significant restrictions in who they can represent, particularly in immigration-based cases.

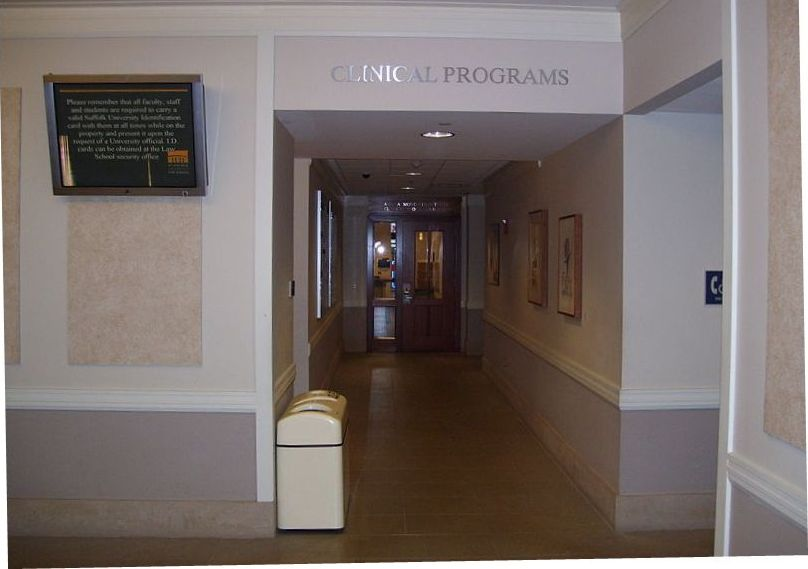
A legal clinic office suite at Suffolk University Law School

Common types of cases taken as legal aid include:

- Denial or deprivation of government benefits
- Evictions
- Domestic violence
- Immigration status
- Discrimination

In 2006, the American Bar Association (ABA) adopted a resolution that defined such issues as "basic human needs", and urged the Federal government to provide legal services in such instances. Thus, some legal aid organizations serve as outside counsel to small nonprofit organizations that lack in-house counsel. The ABA, is also encouraging private attorneys to spend time on pro bono work. Based on its model rule 6.1, “A lawyer should aspire to render at least (50) hours of pro bono publico legal services per year.” Currently, 10 states mandate attorneys to report their pro bono hours. While these rules emphasize the importance of pro bono work, the responsibility of lawyers extends even further. According to Chesterfield H. Smith, former ABA president, "the entire legal profession still has a duty to donate its efforts toward problems beyond those of the poor. The primary onus on lawyers now must be to make society better by using their special and unique skills in the public interest." In an additional report, the ABA explores the gap in access to justice for immigrants in particular. With illegal immigration being considered a civil offense, government appointed representation is not provided to defendants in deportation and other immigration related hearings. In their report, the ABA calls for a right to representation for all immigration cases in order to preserve fundamental due process protections. Discourse surrounding legal representation as a right and not a privilege has significantly shaped policies and protections surrounding legal aid.

Most typical legal aid work involves counseling, informal negotiation, and appearances in administrative hearings, as opposed to formal litigation in the courts. However, the discovery of severe or recurring injustice with a large number of victims will sometimes justify the cost of large-scale impact litigation. Education and law reform activities are also sometimes undertaken.

== History ==
A concerted movement towards substantive civil legal aid programs in the United States did not develop until the mid-1900s. The first legal aid office was founded in lower Manhattan in 1876 in an effort to protect German immigrants from exploitative housing and employment situations. Known as Deutscher Rechts-Schutz Verein, the organization began by serving German immigrants before expanding their services and renaming as the Legal Aid Society in 1896. At the time, legal aid offices served mostly European immigrants, seeking to "Americanize" them through naturalization. Nonwhite immigrants were often seen as unable to assimilate and therefore ineligible to naturalize, resulting in a major lack of accessible legal services. It was not until the War on Poverty era of the 1960s and 1970s that legal aid programs expanded their services through support from the federal government. By 1965, there were around 157 legal aid organizations across the country, serving almost every major city. The growth of legal aid services during this time highlighted an increasing understanding that access to justice is closely linked to larger social issues such as poverty. Significantly, the Office of Economic Opportunity (OEO) Legal Services Program in 1965 is a landmark that put forth an innovative goal: “legal services were to function not only as a treatment for the symptoms of poverty — a remedy, so to speak, for the lack-of-a-lawyer pain — but also as an active agent in the struggle against the poverty disease itself. While these changes helped improve civil legal aid to fight poverty, the courts approach took a different turn. The landmark Supreme Court decision Gideon v. Wainwright guaranteed the right to counsel in criminal matters, but left the issue of civil aid unresolved. Critically, following Gideon v Wainwright, the Court did not extend a guarantee of legal aid to civil matters in Lassiter v Department of Social Services, holding that the provision was less necessary in matters where liberty was not at stake. However, many policy makers and activists highlight the fact that many civil proceedings, deportation cases in particular, threaten the liberty and freedom of the defendant. Significant discourse and debate has arose surrounding whether or not counsel should be appointed in these cases.

The movement towards extending Gideon to civil matters continues to gain momentum, even as states such as New York and California lead the way in establishing more substantive legal aid systems. Today, scholars reveal that there is still a long way to go; they point out that globally, the United States ranks 107th out of 142 countries -- and last among countries in its income bracket -- in its citizens’ ability to access and afford civil justice.

== Prominent figures and institutions ==
Reginald Heber Smith is one of the most influential figures when it comes to legal aid in the United States. He is most well known for his 1919 book Justice and the Poor. In this book, he was critical of legal aid in the U.S., according to legal scholar John M.A. DiPippa. DiPippa wrote “For Smith, the true dawn of "modem legal aid work" happened in 1890, when Arthur Von Briesen took over the management of the German Legal Aid Society, dropped the "German" reference, and began publication in English, thereby broadening its scope beyond German immigrants.” He also believed geographical coverage should be expanded and that legal aid societies should take in a broader range of cases to address more legal issues at hand. This led him to say that the government should address this issue by funding it. The framework and critiques he provided in his book would go on to be adopted in the future, first in the Legal Services Program (LSP) of the Office of Economic Opportunity (OEO), and then later within the Legal Services Corporation (LSC).

=== Office of Economic Opportunity (OEO) ===
The first legal aid program to exist at the federal level was implemented though the Office of Economic Opportunity (OEO), founded in 1965. The OEO was established through the Economic Opportunity Act as part of the Johnson administration's War on Poverty. The first director of OEO, Sargent Shriver. He was persuaded by Jean and Edgar Cahn that funds should be moved towards the provision of legal aid, which spawned the Legal Services Program (LSP) within the OEO. In an interview in which Shriver was asked which program from the war on poverty he most preferred, he replied that "I am proudest of Legal Services because I recognized that it had the greatest potential for changing the system under which people's lives were being exploited." Throughout the 1960s and 1970s the OEO helped to expand federally funded legal aid services to both citizens and immigrants. It was not until the Reagan administration in the early 1980s that the OEO faced significantly restrictions and funding cutbacks.

=== Legal Services for the Poor ===
The United States' first attempt at providing legal remedy came about in 1965. The Office of Economic Opportunity created the Legal Services for the Poor program, under the direction of Sargent Shriver. The ideology behind the program used the "justice model", as it went beyond providing access to legal aid. Its focus was to dismantle barriers faced by those unable to afford legal protections on grounds of discrimination based upon race, gender, and/or class. In this way, the state sought to alleviate poverty using legal remedies, tackling the legal causes of poverty. This approach was employed in the "war on poverty" under the Johnson administration. The new pool of antipoverty lawyers worked to transform the lives of those oppressed by poverty en masse. Using a unique combination of understanding poverty-causing factors while pursuing economic justice, this work aimed to transform the social world that constructed and produced poverty conditions.

In the late 1960s, however, the US saw backlash as those who faced marginalization and poverty became the recipients of economic and social program boons. The "justice model" would be replaced by the "access to justice" model in response to the rapid societal changes occurring within American society under the Nixon administration. This new approach would be crafted under the Legal Services Corporation (LSC), and would have a more individualistic focus with limited social impact, as the United States does not stipulate that legal services are a right to be guaranteed. "Access to justice" is the model that legal aid offices and services would follow for future organizations.

=== Legal Services Corporation (LSC) ===
The Legal Services Corporation (LSC) was a federally-owned corporation that provided funding to legal aid organizations across the nation. The LSC was founded during the War on Poverty, originally under the Office of Economic Opportunity (OEO). The LSC represented a new, more expansive and inclusive, form of legal aid that emerged in the 1960s. Organizations such as the Ford Foundation, began to fund legal services programs located in multi-service social agencies, based on a philosophy that legal services should be a component of an overall anti-poverty effort. In 1969, LSC which at the time was called the Legal Services Program (LSP) brought Shapiro v. Thompson to the Supreme Court as a 'welfare test case' with the direct support of Edward Sparer. Shapiro v. Thompson was significant in pushing the ideological idea that welfare was a 'fundamental right' and would help end poverty. In 1974, Congress created the Legal Services Corporation (LSC) to provide federal funding for civil (non-criminal) legal aid services. By 1975, the Legal Service Corporation had taken over the function of OEO, leaving its organizational structure largely unchanged.

Funding usually comes from the federal government Legal Services Corporation (LSC), Interest on Lawyer Trust Accounts, charities, private donors, and some state and local governments. Legal aid organizations that take LSC money tend to have more staff and services and can help more clients, but must also conform to strict government regulations that require careful timekeeping and prohibit lobbying and class actions. Organizations that receive LSC funding cannot take funding from non LSC sources to pursue legislative efforts that contradict LSC regulations. This becomes especially relevant when LSC funded legal aid organization attempt to represent immigrant populations. In 1982, Congress passed policies that limited the certain immigrants LSC funded organizations could represent, barring undocumented immigrants from accessing LSC services. Federal funding restrictions have played a major role in shaping what populations lack consistent access to affordable legal services. In addition to restrictions on lobbying, class actions, and immigration related representation, LSC organizations also cannot purse abortion related litigation and cannot advance certain state or federal welfare challenges. LSC organizations are not able to conduct workshops related to political activities and advocacy as well. Many legal aid organizations refuse to take LSC money, and can continue to file class actions and directly lobby legislatures on behalf of the poor. Many organizations that provide civil legal services are heavily dependent on Interest on Lawyer Trust Accounts for funding. Some civil aid organizations accept private donations and grants if they refuse LSC funding.

However, even with supplemental funding from LSC, the total amount of legal aid available for civil cases is still grossly inadequate. Demand for legal services remains high. In 2018, an estimated 58.5 million Americans were eligible for LSC programs. According to LSC's first annual Justice Gap report, initiated by LSC president Helaine M. Barnett in 2005, all legal aid offices nationwide, LSC-funded or not, are together able to meet only about 20 percent of the estimated legal needs of low-income people in the United States. The widely released 2005 report, "Documenting the Justice Gap in America: The Current Unmet Civil Legal Needs of Low-Income Americans," concludes that 86% of civil legal problems facing Americans have received inadequate or no legal assistance in the past year. The report also finds that 71% of low-income households were at some point in need of civil legal services within the year. The report states that "in 2017, low-income Americans approached LSC-funded legal aid organizations for support with an estimated 1.7 million problems. They will receive only limited or no legal help for more than half of these problems due to a lack of resources."

== Legal aid at the state level ==
The provision of legal services on a federal level through the LSC is largely inadequate, and leaves a large volume of unmet demand. In the absence of a major decision from the Supreme Court affirming the right to civil counsel, as came to pass with criminal matters through Gideon v. Wainwright, States have been left to their own devices to fulfill the high demand for legal services.

A significant development in this area came as every state, beginning with Florida, created some version of an Interest on Lawyer Trust Accounts program.

=== New York ===
Historically, civil legal aid in the United States began in New York with the founding of the Legal Aid Society of New York in 1876. In 2017, New York City became the first place in the US to guarantee legal services to all tenants facing eviction with the passage of the "Right to Counsel Law". The bill was originally introduced in 2014 by New York City Council Members Mark D. Levine and Vanessa Gibson before being expanded into its current form. Funding for legal services centered around eviction and housing will increase over the course of five years, reaching $155 million by 2022. The services are to be implemented by the New York City Office of Civil Justice (OCJ) to households making no more than 200% of the federal poverty line.

The legislation includes a provision for OCJ to provide annual reports to monitor the progress and effectiveness of the services being provided. The 2017 reports finds that evictions have declined by 27% since 2013, and that "over the four-year period of 2014 through 2017, an estimated 70,000 New Yorkers remained in their homes as a result of the decreased evictions."

=== California ===
Historically California is home to the first OEO program to aid rural areas, while also being state-wide. Founded in 1966, California Rural Legal Assistance (CRLA). Initially they were unknown, but CRLA hit the ground running, fighting for farmworkers first, successfully suing to stop the importation of braceros to possibly be used as strike breakers against the union protests by the United Farmworkers of America (UFW) and suing Governor Reagan to stop him from cutting back funding for Medi-Cal. Today CRLA services 43,000 low-income rural Californians, with 18 offices located all throughout rural California.

The 2009 Sargent Shriver Civil Counsel Act created a number of pilot programs that advanced representation in civil aid cases regarding basic human needs to assess the benefits of civil legal aid, and the logistics of wider implementation. A 2017 study examined 10 of these legal aid programs, and found that recipients of aid had greatly improved prospects in eviction cases. 67% of cases settled, an increase of 33% compared to self pro per (self represented) cases. Critically, the study found that, "while all Shriver clients received eviction notices, only 6% were ultimately evicted from their homes." If income requirements are not met, legal aid organizations in California funded by the Legal Services Corporation cannot provide services to constituents. This disproportionately affects Latinos/as living in California.

The San Francisco Board of Supervisors passed an ordinance in 2012 declaring its intention to make San Francisco the first city to guarantee a right to counsel. In June 2018, San Francisco implemented a "Right to Counsel" program guaranteeing legal representation to tenants facing eviction.

Currently, the Los Angeles City Counsel is considering "Right To Counsel" legislation that may look very similar to those being enacted in New York and San Francisco.

=== Wisconsin ===
The Wisconsin Supreme Court joined the Interest on Lawyer Trust Accounts movement in 1986 with the establishment of the Wisconsin Trust Account Foundation.

== Pro bono ==
The problem of chronic underfunding of legal aid is that it traps the lower middle class in no-man's-land: too rich to qualify for legal aid, too poor to pay an attorney in private practice. To remedy the ongoing shortage of legal aid services, some commentators have suggested that mandatory pro bono obligations ought to be required of all lawyers, just as physicians working in emergency rooms are required to treat all patients regardless of ability to pay. Such proposals have been mostly fought off by bar associations successfully. In their 1993 Model Rule 6.1, the American Bar Association emphasized the importance of attorneys providing a minimum of fifty hours of free legal assistance to low-income litigants annually. To justify this requirement, the American Bar Association has referenced the larger movement to incorporate larger ideals that are central to the legal profession, such as public service and advancing the public good, in actionable ways. Since then, pro bono legal work has become institutionalized in large firms. Before the 1990s, pro bono legal work was provided mainly by small firms; however, by the end of the 1990s, pro bono was distributed "through a network of structures designed to facilitate the mass provision of free services by law firm volunteers acting out of professional duty". 1/3 of Latino lawyers perform pro bono work and 49% of Latino lawyers report to meet this 50 hour annual quota with 8.3% report to providing 200 hours or more. Pro bono services are sometimes awarded by Courts in cases related to employment, sex discrimination, consumer credit and fraud amongst others.

A notable exception is the Orange County Bar Association in Orlando, Florida, which requires all bar members to participate in its Legal Aid Society, by either serving in a pro bono capacity or donating a fee in lieu of service. Even where mandatory pro bono exists, however, funding for legal aid remains severely insufficient to provide assistance to a majority of those in need. Along with challenges in funding, legal scholars argue that the current pro bono system "fails to incentive high-quality legal assistance ... [because it] cannot replace the expertise and experience of seasoned lawyers". The concern is that, since pro bono services are often viewed as an opportunity for professional development for less experienced attorneys, the emphasis shifts away from the quality of services provided for a client to the attorney's growth. Moreover, access to pro bono services is often hindered by geographic access, particularly in rural areas where populations are widely dispersed. Thus, even with an increase in pro bono services, the delivery of these services remains a challenge that stands in the way of addressing the justice gap as a whole.

The term pro bono came into official existence in 1919. Reginald Heber Smith uncovered in his study of how drastically different the poor and rich prevailed in legal matters within the U.S. What Smith honed in on was need for lawyers to serve the "financially unservable", or those that could least afford legal services, but would also significantly benefit from such services. The issue with that notion however, means that a lawyer would not be compensated for their skills, knowledge, and time. Today, there are the "no costs to you" contingent contracts advertised to make a profit in the long run, in addition to the recommendation that private lawyers offer at least 50 hours of pro bono services per year in providing legal aid to those that cannot afford their services. To be clear, there is no mandate requiring any law firm or legal service providers to part take in either of these processes, only a recommendation that all lawyers "should aspire to" serve, and lawyers who wish to extend themselves in such a capacity must decide to render their services free of charge.

Organizations that offer pro bono services are designed to benefit those in underrepresented groups such as immigrants and refugees. Immigrant lawyers face barriers in their lawyer-client relationships due to the lack of access to justice placed by administrative and political barriers. When it comes to offering legal aid to immigrants in the United States, pro bono services are an important resource for immigrants, but very few can access adequate legal aid. Additionally, there are ethical questions raised by legal aid critiques as to whether or not immigrants should be able to utilize pro bono legal aid services due to their lack of citizenship status. The 14th Amendment calls for equal protection despite national origin, but undocumented non-citizens are not required to be granted equal access under federal law. This tends to bar immigrants from equal access to justice and due process.

=== Lawyer-client relationships in pro bono services ===
A significant debate around pro bono services focuses on the lawyer-client relationship and the distribution of power within it. Since the 1970s, civil rights and public interest organizations have coined and used the concept of "lawyer domination", which is a perception that lawyers act according to their personal beliefs about what path of action would be best for the client. For low-income or minority clients, their submission to the lawyers' control and authoritative decision-making was seen as the "price of access to the courts". With the lack of financial leverage that clients have over their counsel, lawyers have historically held more paternalistic attitudes to pro bono work, as opposed to a more collaborative approach. From the perspective of legal services lawyers, the assumption is that the "client is interested in a result and comes to you presumably because you know the best way, or the way that is most likely to get that result [...] So, there has to be some reliance on the expertise of the attorney in establishing and suggesting ways to proceed". In thirty-two percent of cases, lawyers referenced making strategic decisions with no participation from the client at all.

Critics argue that interactions between lawyers and clients should be dictated by the guidelines laid out in the American Bar Association's Code of Professional Responsibility. Aside from this code, there is no other description or guidelines for client-lawyer relationships and a great deal of variation, as a result, in practice. The conflict of interest provision of the code ensures that attorneys prioritize loyalty to their clients' goals over their individual interests or external interests. Generally, the code equips lawyers with more power over the 'means' and leaves clients with responsibility for the major decisions of a case (including if a client wants to settle or appeal).

When it comes to immigration courts, relationships between lawyers and their clients are essential to winning deportation cases. This relationship tends to be strained in immigration courts due to the high caseloads and tight deadlines that immigrant lawyers face. The American Bar Association's Code of Professional Responsibility does not include guidelines for immigration lawyers to address the trauma that their clients experience.

==== Trauma-informed litigation ====
The litigation process in immigration courts is challenging for immigrants, as well as for lawyer-client relationships. Research has indicated a "triple trauma paradigm" that immigrants face: trauma suffered during the migration journey, trauma in relocating, and trauma again in the asylum or immigration process. The trauma of applying for relief before an immigration court is given the least public attention. During the litigation process in immigration courts, immigration lawyers place a large emphasis on the traumatic stories immigrants have faced in order to help build their case against deportation.Though consulted, immigrants play a very minimal role in decision-making when it comes to presenting their case in front of a court. The lawyers ultimately make the final decisions and tend to make trauma the centerpiece of representation in court. This process brings up many ethical questions in regards to immigration law as an institution, and legal aid for immigrants as a sector.

== Administrative legal aid ==
A few states (e.g., California) have also guaranteed the right to counsel for indigent defendants in "quasi-criminal" or administrative law cases like involuntary terminations of parental rights and paternity actions.

== Community-based legal aid ==
The creation of community-based legal aid organizations typically form in response to people facing disenfranchisement or lack of services, when they are unable to pay for a lawyer. An example of such a community based legal aid program is the creation of the New York's Legal Aid Society, founded in 1876 to help German immigrants deal with a series of issues experienced within their communities. The lack (or inability to navigate and understand the U.S. legal system) led to German-Americans to develop this site to assist the people, who were vulnerable to wage abuse, criminalization, and other legal issues that plagued their lives. Other organizations would use legal means as practical steps in transforming fundamental American social values and culture. The National Association for the Advancement of Colored People (NAACP), and American Civil Liberties Union (ACLU), are two of the most recognized legal aid service providers within the U.S., but would come about later, founded in 1909 and 1920s respectively. Legal aid organizations were formed outside the legitimization scope of the state, using law to pursue, challenge, and change existing legislation that worked against the most vulnerable citizens based upon grounds of race, gender, citizenship, and other categories by which the poor were disadvantaged.

Legal clinics have become centers of legal aid, advice, and sites of holistic approaches to poverty. Within these spaces, the poor have access to justice, along with a less specialized legal pool of knowledge addressing the more common complaints that impact the day to day on-goings of life, also known as the "generalists" approach, creating a type of "one stop shop" which attempts to have all the legal needs of a client met in a single space, cutting down expenses of having to have multiple lawyers in multiple sites for multiple legal issues. These sites also take into consideration the cultural and social considerations that contribute to the mental and social aversions to be able to seek legal aid by disadvantaged populations. A crucial part of this model is to meet the client where they are, or at least, be in a location that is actually feasible, and convenient for the client to visit. Insert neighborhood legal clinics, and their multifaceted approach to a multifaceted issue. Because poverty law "is not a specialized field", there can be multiple issues a single client may experience, possibly simultaneously, and may not be all related to one particular case, or interwoven to such a degree that addressing one part of the problem leads to a chain reaction of sorts to affect all the moving parts.

== Impact ==
In 2003, a study was published that linked civil legal aid to a marked decline in rates of Intimate partner violence (IPV). Programs funded by the LSC closed 120,944 cases involving domestic violence in 2017 alone. In the decade following this study, a considerable body of research began to take shape investigating the positive impact of civil legal aid. Studies have established legal aid as providing such benefits as decreasing homelessness as well as the need for emergency shelters through reducing evictions. Over the last two decades, civil legal aid services have shown to save the homes of more than 6,000 tenants in New York according to the 1996 study by the Association of the Bar of the City of New York. Because of the fragmented nature of civil legal aid in the US, cost benefit analyses are often specific to a given State. A 2010 article that gathered multiple other studies found that the benefits go beyond reducing domestic violence rates, finding that access to aid also brings more funds into a state by helping individuals receive federal benefits, protecting children, and aiding select groups such as seniors and veterans who are often exploited. A report from the ABA Day in Washington lists a State by State cost benefit analysis, finding a return on investment as high as 9:1 in Alabama in 2015.

=== East Bay Community Law Center (EBCLC) ===
The East Bay Community Law Center provides free legal services to Alameda County residents. There are a variety of legal clinics from Berkeley Boalt Law School and legal divisions within the EBCLC and each has its own criteria establishing potential clients' eligibility for receiving their services. The EBCLC has two locations in Berkeley with one location on University Ave and one on Adeline Street. The EBCLC provides Clean Slate Services, Community Economic Justice Clinic Services, Consumer Justice and General Clinic Services, Education Defense and Justice for Youth Services, Health and Welfare Services, Housing Services, and Immigration services.

=== Advancing Justice: Asian Law Caucus ===
Advancing Justice: Asian Law Caucus is a Bay Area organization that provides legal services, encourages community empowerment, and facilities policy advocacy for immigrants of Asian descent. They provide pro bono legal aid ranging from class action lawsuits to direct services through legal clinics in San Francisco. Additionally, the Asian Law Caucus organizes community movements to raise awareness for immigrants and refugees of Asian descent. The Asian Law Caucus' work is centered around immigrants, refugees, incarcerated people, and low-income workers.

==== The Fair Debt Buying Practices Act ====
Born out of the work of community collaboration, the Fair Debt Buying Practices Act harks back to the original perspective of legal aid; the attainment of justice and fundamental change to a system from the ground up, creating a meaningful societal transformation of out from under poverty, shifting the culture under which American social spaces operate. This was achieved through an effort to serve the community, via an open door General Clinic event, leading the EBCLC to become aware of a disproportionately large number of clients all being sued over credit card debt. Because the General Clinic allowed for all clients experiencing forms of various legal matters to seek legal assistance, it was able to capture clients along with evidence and data that supported the position that this particular occurrence was a targeted business strategy, preying upon the legally ignorant, marginalized, and poorest citizens. The ability to deliver legal remedies to the clients was only one part of the solution deployed by EBCLC. The other half enlisted the collaborative efforts of community members, academic and educational forces (i.e. law students serving the clinic) along with legal proposals to change the laws that allowed for this legal poverty trap to exist.

=== Limitations of civil legal aid in the Latino community ===
Legal services available for Latino and Hispanic clients vary. This clientele can include Spanish speaking and undocumented clients. Latinos often mistake notaries as legal organizations and they turn to notaries for legal advice that they are unqualified to give. The relationship between the Hispanic community and legal aid services can be described as low in confidence. 44% of Hispanics say they have little confidence courts will treat them fairly and 49% believe they will be treated fairly. 19% of Latinos say they or an immediate family member have attended court or have been involved in a criminal matter with brief attorney services. Institutional limitations such as income cut off quotas are a main deterrence in obtaining certain legal aid services for Latinos. For many Hispanic clients, poverty, family composition, and demographics determine social and legal aid needs. Non-legal issues such as stalking, domestic abuse, visa expiration, and language barrier can also affect a client's ability to access legal aid. Lack of diverse racial consciousness can prevent lawyers from providing adequate services for Latino/a and Hispanic clients. At the criminal level, public defenders often do not speak Spanish, and they tend to recommend plea-bargaining over trials for Latino and Hispanic clients.

=== Serving Latino and Hispanic clients ===
If Latino clients have negative encounters with the criminal justice system in their specific counties of origin, they may struggle to understand the legal system of the United States. When providing legal services for Latino clients, legal practitioners should ask what nationality or ethnic group the client is from. Attorneys and legal aid providers should not assume Latino or Hispanic clients speak Spanish. They should confirm what languages the client does speak. It is recommended that legal organizations have Spanish translated documents about legal proceedings so that Spanish speaking clients can understand legal terminology. Undocumented Latinos can suffer additional immigration consequences because the legal representation received by Latino clients in this field of law lack cultural and immigration background.

=== Latino lawyers ===
Latino lawyers serve as resources for advocacy and leadership in the Latino/a community. They are more likely to be a part of a small firm or work in the field of public service and non profit legal services. Latinos make up 3% of lawyers, and are inadequately represented as partners or associates of large law firms, prosecutors, and defense attorneys.

== List of Legal Aid Organizations by State ==
=== Alabama ===
Legal Services Alabama: Anniston, Gadsden, Birmingham, Dothan, Huntsville, Mobile, Montgomery, Selma and Tuscaloosa.

=== Alaska ===
Alaska Legal Services Corporation: Serves Anchorage, Bethel, Dillingham, Fairbanks, Juneau/Ketchikan, Kenai, Kodiak, Kotzebue, Nome, and Mat-Su.

=== Pennsylvania ===
Legal Aid of Southeastern Pennsylvania: Serves Bucks, Montgomery, Chester, and Delaware County.

Community Legal Services: Serves Philadelphia County.

Mid-Penn Legal Services: Serves Adam, Bedford, Berks, Blair, Centre, Clearfield, Cumberland, Dauphin, Franklin, Fulton, Huntingdon, Juniata, Lancaster, Lebanon, Mifflin, Perry, Schuylkill, and York Counties.

=== Illinois ===
Land of Lincoln: Serves Clinton, Fayette, Monroe, Randolph, St. Clair, Washington, Adams, Bond, Brown, Calhoun, Greene, Hancock, Jersey, Macoupin, Madison, Montgomery, Pike, Schuyler, Cass, Christian, Logan, Mason, Menard, Morgan, Sangamon, Scott, Shelby, Champaign, Clark, Coles, Crawford, Cumberland, De Witt, Douglas, Edgar, Effingham, Ford, Jasper, Macon, Moultrie, Piatt, Vermilion, Alexander, Clay, Edwards, Franklin, Gallatin, Hamilton, Hardin, Jackson, Jefferson, Johnson, Lawrence, Marion, Massac, Perry, Pope, Pulaski, Richland, Saline, Union, Wabash, White, and Williamson.

Prairie State Legal Services: Serves McLean, Livingston, Woodford, Henderson, Knox, McDonough, Warren, Grundy, Will, Iroquois, Kankakee, Bureau, LaSalle, Putnam, Fulton, Marshall, Peoria, Stark, Tazewell, Henry, Lee, Mercer, Rock Island, Whiteside, Boone, Carroll, Jo Daviess, Ogle, Stephenson, Winnebago, Lake, Dekalb, DuPage, Kane, Kendall, and McHenry Counties.

=== New York ===
The Legal Aid Society: Serves New York City.

New York Legal Assistance Group (NYLAG): Serves New York City.

Legal Services NYC: Serves New York City.

The Bronx Defenders: Serves New York City.

=== Virginia ===
Blue Ridge Legal Services, Inc.: Serves Shenandoah Valley and Roanoke Valley of Virginia.

Central Virginia Legal Aid Society, Inc.: Serves Richmond, Charlottesville, and Petersburg.

Legal Aid Society of Eastern Virginia: Serves Norfolk, Hampton, Belle Haven, and Williamsburg.

Legal Services of Northern Virginia: Serves Arlington, Fairfax, Alexandria, Prince William, Loudoun, Route 1, and Fredericksburg.

Southwest Virginia Legal Aid Society: Serves Marion, Castlewood, and Christianburg.

Virginia Legal Aid Society: Serves Danville, Martinsville, Lynchburg, Farmville, and Suffolk.

=== California ===
International Rescue Committee: Serves Los Angeles, Oakland, Sacramento, San Diego, San Jose, and Turlock.

Bay Area Legal Aid: Serves broader Bay Area, office located in Oakland.

== See also ==
- Contract attorney
- Legal clinic
- Public defender
- Legal Aid Society
  - Legal Aid Society of Cleveland
- New York Legal Assistance Group
- Legal Aid in Texas: Texas Legal Services Center, Texas Rio Grande Legal Aid
