= F. William McCalpin =

American lawyer

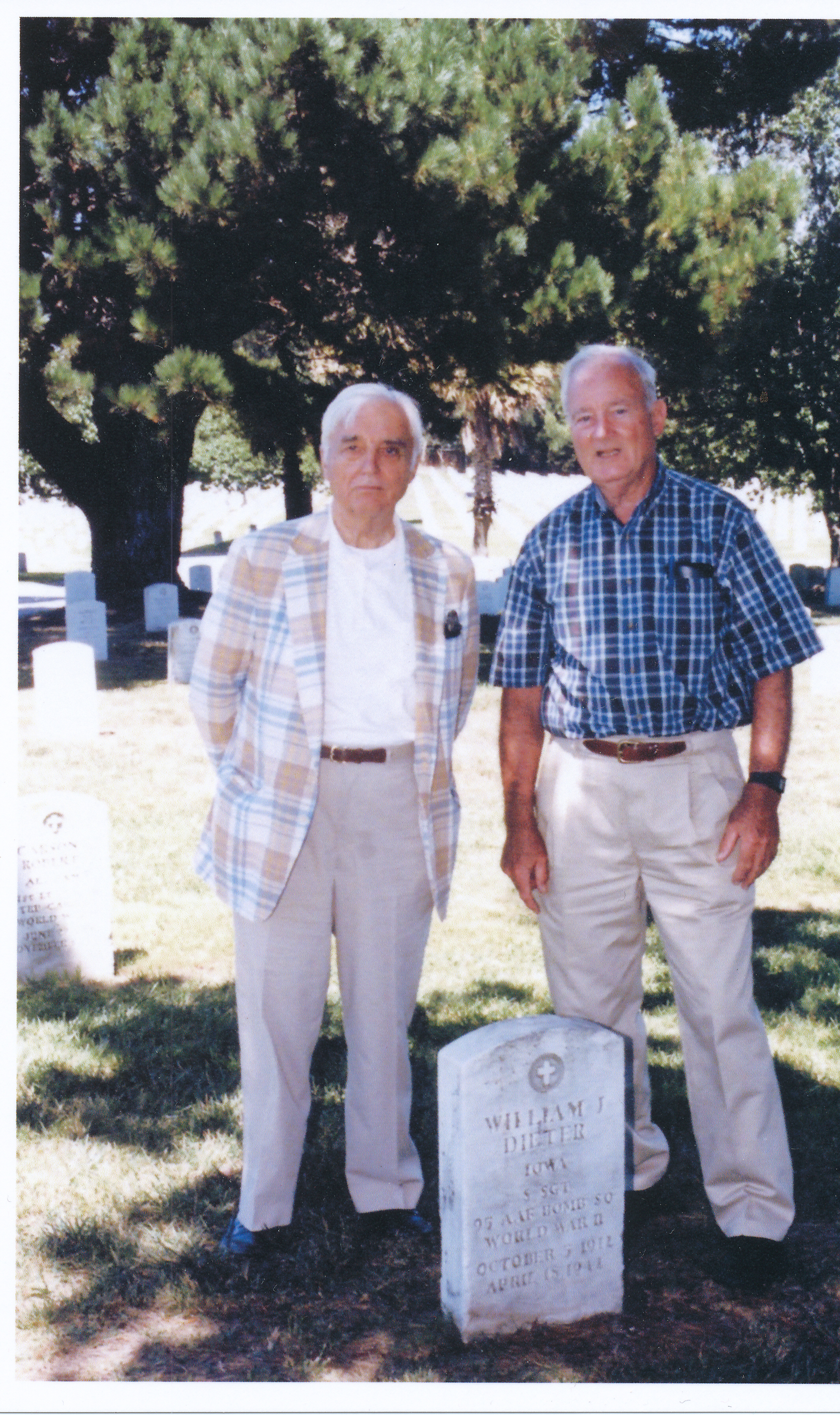
Brothers F. William McCalpin (left) and George A. McCalpin (right) in Golden Gate National Cemetery in August 2007 at the grave of their cousin Sgt. William "Billy Jack" Dieter who died on the Doolittle Raid.

F. William McCalpin (8 November 1921 – 9 December 2009) was an American attorney, who throughout his career was a strong advocate for legal services within the American Bar Association. He was involved in a variety of leadership positions supporting both the private bar and legal services. He was named Chair twice of the national Legal Services Corporation and served on that organization's board of directors across four decades. Hillary Clinton, who served as Chair of the Legal Services Corporation between McCalpin's two terms as Chair, wrote of him, "He was an extraordinary man, a valued mentor and a true champion for equal justice and access to legal services for the poor. Through his work Bill changed lives and made an indelible impact upon the legal community."

McCalpin was a partner and counsel of the St. Louis, Missouri law firm Lewis, Rice & Fingersh, L.C.. He was awarded in 1988 the American Bar Association Medal, awarded to recognize "exceptionally distinguished service by a lawyer to the cause of American jurisprudence." The F. William McCalpin Pro Bono Award, given by the Legal Services of Eastern Missouri, is named for him. In addition, Legal Services of Eastern Missouri dedicated the F. Wm. McCalpin Wall of Justice in 1999.

On November 19, 2010, the Legal Services Corporation dedicated its Conference Center Washington, DC, to McCalpin, formally naming it in his honor.

Besides local papers, The New York Times ran McCalpin's obituary on December 17, 2009.

Political offices
Preceded by Hillary Rodham	Legal Services Corporation Chair; 1980–1981	Succeeded by William F. Harvey
