= Legal Services Corp. v. Velazquez =

- Supreme Court of the United States

Argued October 4, 2000 Decided February 28, 2001
- Full case name: Legal Services Corporation v. Carmen Velazquez, et al.
- Citations: 531 U.S. 533 (more) 121 S. Ct. 1043; 149 L. Ed. 2d 63

Case history
- Prior: Plaintiffs' motion for injunction denied, 985 F. Supp. 323 (E.D.N.Y. 1997); aff'd in part, rev'd in part, 164 F.3d 757 (2d Cir. 1999)
- Subsequent: Permanent injunction granted, 349 F. Supp. 2d 566 (E.D.N.Y. 2004)

Holding
- A restriction on advocacy by the Legal Services Corporation (LSC) seeking to change welfare law is an unconstitutional viewpoint restriction even though the LSC is a quasi-government entity.

Court membership
- Chief Justice William Rehnquist Associate Justices John P. Stevens · Sandra Day O'Connor; Antonin Scalia · Anthony Kennedy; David Souter · Clarence Thomas; Ruth Bader Ginsburg · Stephen Breyer

Case opinions
- Majority: Kennedy, joined by Stevens, Souter, Ginsburg, Breyer
- Dissent: Scalia, joined by Rehnquist, O'Connor, Thomas

Laws applied
- U.S. Const. Amend. I; 42 U.S.C. § 2996e(d)(4)

Legal Services Corp. v. Velazquez, 531 U.S. 533 (2001), is a decision of the Supreme Court of the United States concerning the constitutionality of funding restrictions imposed by the United States Congress. At issue were restrictions on the Legal Services Corporation (LSC), a private, nonprofit corporation established by Congress. The restrictions prohibited LSC attorneys from representing clients attempting to amend (or challenge) existing welfare law. The case was brought by Carmen Velazquez, whose LSC-funded attorneys sought to challenge existing welfare provisions since they believed that it was the only way to get Velazquez financial relief.

The Court ruled that the restrictions violated the free speech guarantees of the First Amendment to the United States Constitution. Because LSC facilitated "private" speech, that of its grantees, the restrictions did not simply regulate government speech.

Because the restrictions blocked attempts to change only a specific area of law, the Court held, they could not be considered viewpoint-neutral, and the government is prohibited from making such viewpoint-based restrictions of private speech.

Reactions to the decision were mixed within Congress, with Republicans and Democrats disagreeing on the propriety of the decision. Several law review articles argued that the use of a "distortion principle" to decide violations of free speech was an unreasonable and unconstitutional rule whose conditions on funding might "distort" speech advocacy. Others contended that the Court mishandled the interpretation of the statute at issue.

== Background ==
=== History of funding restriction jurisprudence ===
The first major test of the federal government's power over funding restrictions based on speech was the 1991 case Rust v. Sullivan. In Rust, the Supreme Court had upheld a restriction on the use of Department of Health and Human Services funds for counseling, referring patients to, or advocating the use of abortion services. The Court reasoned that the restriction "merely [chose] to fund one activity to the exclusion of the other." Here, the government was using private speakers to transmit information about the government's own program.

Six years later, the Court reviewed another restriction, this time about funding restrictions imposed by a public university. In the 1997 case Rosenberger v. University of Virginia, a government supported university sought to withhold funds from religious student publications although it funded similar secular publications. The Court said that the government could seek to shape funding to support a government message, such restrictive steps could not be imposed to the exclusion of a particular viewpoint.

=== Legal Services Corporation ===
In 1974 the United States Congress passed the Legal Services Corporation Act, which established the Legal Services Corporation. The purpose of the Act was to provide government-funded legal aid to indigent clients that would be funded through grants to regional entities throughout the country. In 1996, Congress amended the act with that year's appropriations bill, which imposed restrictions on the LSC. The restrictions included prohibitions against filing class action lawsuits, providing legal assistance to immigrants in particular types of cases, collecting attorney's fees, soliciting clients, providing advocacy training programs, and attempting to reform welfare laws. The restrictions affected only a small portion of the caseload. The restrictions prohibited funding cases:

... initiating legal representation or participating in any other way, in litigation, lobbying, or rulemaking, involving an effort to reform a Federal or State welfare system, except that this paragraph shall not be construed to preclude a recipient from representing an individual eligible client who is seeking specific relief from a welfare agency if such relief does not involve an effort to amend or otherwise challenge existing welfare law in effect on the date of the initiation of the representation.

=== Lower-court proceedings ===
In 1997, Carmen Velazquez lost welfare benefits from the government under the provisions of the Temporary Assistance for Needy Families Act (TANF). An attorney from an LSC grantee, Bronx Legal Services, litigated her claim. Bronx Legal Services, on behalf of Velazquez, filed suit in the United States District Court for the Eastern District of New York to seek a declaration that the provision of the Act prohibiting challenges to existing welfare law was unconstitutional under the First Amendment. It argued that there was no way to help Velazquez without challenging the welfare system itself, and it sought to challenge the provisions under which Velazquez lost her benefits, a challenge that they could not make because of the 1996 restrictions. The district court denied an injunction.

The court's decision was affirmed in part and reversed in part by the United States Court of Appeals for the Second Circuit, which unanimously held that the welfare-advocacy restriction was unconstitutional, but upheld other restrictions that Bronx Legal Services had challenged (such as the lobbying restriction) by a 2–1 vote. The Second Circuit also rejected the claim that any funding conditions would be illegitimate by instead preferring a case-by-case analysis. LSC asked the Supreme Court for a review and argued that the Second Circuit had been wrong in striking only down the welfare-advocacy restriction.

== Supreme Court decision ==
The Supreme Court heard oral arguments in the case on October 4, 2000 and issued its decision four months later.

The Court affirmed the decision of the Second Circuit Court of Appeals by holding 5-4 that the restriction on pursuing welfare advocacy was unconstitutional because of the First Amendment.

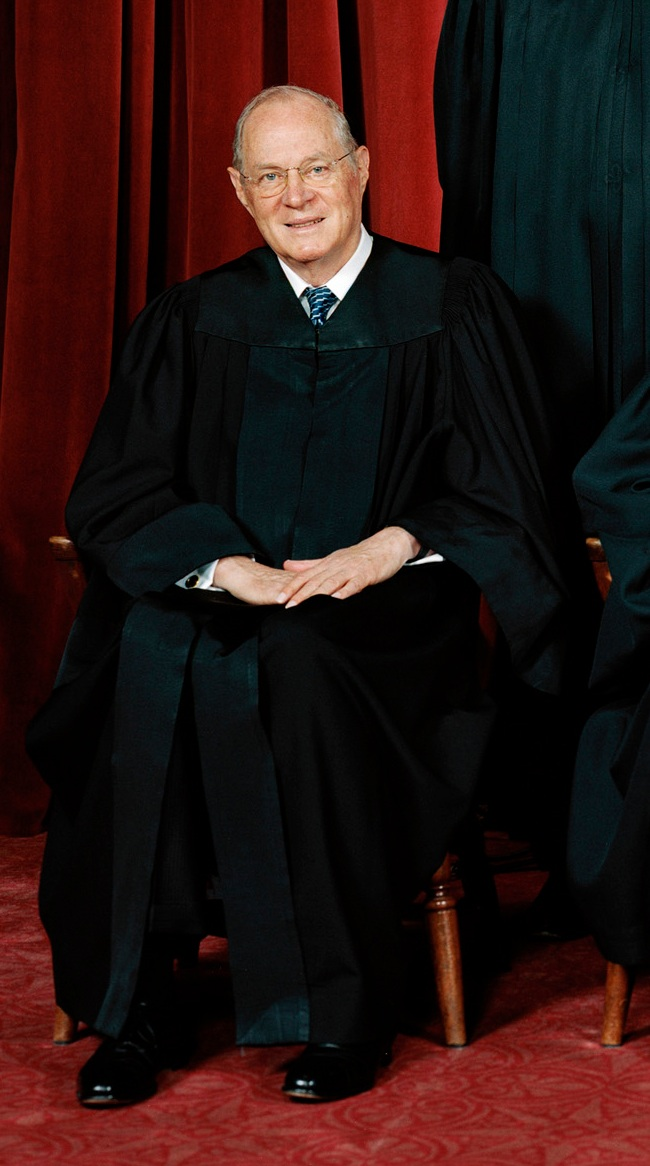
Justice Kennedy wrote the majority opinion in Velazquez.

Justice Kennedy delivered the majority opinion. It distinguished a 1991 Supreme Court case, Rust v. Sullivan, which upheld a prohibition on federally funded family planning services from discussing abortion with their patients. The majority reasoned that in Rust, the government was attempting to use its funds to express its own message, but the purpose of the Act was to promote a diversity of private views with its funding, not an attempt to restrict any views. The Court said that the government can only issue "content-neutral" conditions on such speech and that the specific prohibition on welfare-reform litigation was viewpoint-based by restricting only support for welfare reform advocacy. "If the restriction on speech and legal advice were to stand, the result would be two tiers of cases... there would be lingering doubt whether the truncated representation had resulted in complete analysis of the case, full advice to the client, and proper presentation to the court."

The Court also criticized the fact that the restriction functionally barred attorneys from participating in the courts. Any attorney receiving LSC funding would not be able to litigate welfare claims that challenged welfare rules, thereby preventing certain cases from being filed. "The restriction imposed by the statute here threatens severe impairment of the judicial function.... We must be vigilant when Congress imposes rules and conditions which, in effect, insulate its own laws from legitimate judicial challenge."

=== Dissent ===
Justice Scalia wrote a dissenting opinion from the decision of the Court and believed that Rust mandated a ruling upholding the restriction. Scalia was joined by Chief Justice William H. Rehnquist and Associate Justices Sandra Day O'Connor and Clarence Thomas and wrote, "The [act] is a federal subsidy program, not a federal regulatory program... regulations directly restrict speech; subsidies do not." He disagreed with the majority's contention that there was viewpoint discrimination and argued that no specific viewpoint was restricted. Scalia was also concerned with dicta in the majority opinion that seemed to him to indicate a "fondness" for the concept of reform by using the courts.

He argued that the majority's holding was "unprecedented" because it was the first time the government would be limited in advocating its own message.

== Reactions ==
The immediate reaction was mixed among members of Congress. Democratic supporters of the decision were optimistic of future victories against funding restrictions and stated that they were glad the restriction had fallen but that the decision "opens the LSC up to even more attacks." Republicans in Congress condemned the decision and agreeing to work against it. US Representative Steve Largent (R-OK) said, "It'll be on the radar screen for sure.... Why are we giving taxpayer money to sue taxpayers?" The New York Times described the decision as the end of the "latest chapter, although almost certainly not the last, in a long political struggle over the federally financed program of civil legal services for the poor."

Parties involved in the case also had mixed reactions. LSC, which had sought to protect the restrictions, said that it would "immediately review [their] regulations and then modify them to adhere to the Court's ruling," which it did quickly after the decision. Burt Neuborne, the lawyer who argued against the restriction before the Supreme Court, said that the ruling "really reads like a First Amendment textbook."

== Subsequent developments ==
In the weeks following the Velazquez decision, the Supreme Court rejected appeals related to other LSC restrictions. LSC has engaged in welfare-reform litigation since the original injunction was lifted.

The case provided the basis for other challenges to restrictions imposed on LSC, such as bans against lobbying or class actions. The challenges were rejected by the Ninth Circuit and the Second Circuit in separate suits. The challenges failed because the relevant provisions do not regulate a specific type of advocacy; for example, the restriction on LSC grantees from collecting attorney's fees would not raise a speech issue because there is no speech involved in such a process. The argument raised in those challenges was that the Court articulated a new "conditions" principle in Velazquez, a distortion-of-speech test, which they argued would require the restrictions to be struck down. Both courts of appeal reviewing that claim have rejected that reading of Velazquez. Instead of a distortion-of-speech test, the decision was based on the application of limited public forum principles. When the government provides funds to an entity, and the funding's purpose was to encourage diversity of private views, it must act in a viewpoint-neutral way. Programs funded in this manner are treated as a public forum in which the ability of the government to restrict speech is highly limited.

The implications of those subsequent rulings mandated two new rules, one narrow and one broad. Firstly, restrictions may be imposed on LSC as long as they do not discriminate on the basis of "viewpoint" or "opinion." Because the other restrictions were not based on viewpoint, they were upheld. Secondly, on a broader scale the government may not discriminate against viewpoints in any instance that it is funding a private entity to that a diversity of views. For this reason, the decision in Velazquez set an important binding precedent for how the government may act as subsidizer and speaker.

== Analysis and commentary ==
A Journal of Law and Politics article by Jay Johnson was critical of the decision and the Court's claimed distinction between the speech restriction in Rust and the one on LSC and contended that there was no functional difference between the two. The article highlighted a problem with the Court's interpretation of the statute's purpose at hand: "Even assuming the propriety of invoking legislative purpose in statutory interpretation, the text of the [Act] does not support the Court's understanding of the Act's purpose." The article noted that although the Court looked at a section of the Act discussing attorneys "protecting the best interest of their clients," the same section noted that the program must be free of "political pressures." Because a factor in the Court's reasoning was its understanding of the Act's purpose, that alleged error purportedly misguided the rest of the Court's analysis.

Further criticism from the article was that the Court unduly rested its decision on a separation of powers determination. The Court held in Velazquez that the restriction on welfare advocacy cases disrupted the "vital relationship between the bar and the judiciary." That finding, the article argued, was baseless because there is no connection between preventing some government lawyers from arguing a single point and the deprivation of due process rights. It concluded that the fundamental problems of statutory interpretation and a lack of a credible distinction with Rust in Justice Kennedy's analysis renders the opinion "unconvincing."

An article in the Maryland Law Review by Christopher Gozdor, a lawyer in the Maryland Attorney General's office, was also critical of the decision, but he was concerned with an alleged lack of clarity in the majority opinion. It discussed the case law relating to government speech and examined what it described as the "conditions doctrine" by which certain conditions on receiving federal funds were upheld or struck down.

The article then turned to the Rust distinction. Gozdor explained: "The Court distinguished Velazquez from Rust because Rust involved a subsidy to facilitate private expression of the government's message, while Velazquez involved LSC funding that was designed [for] private speech." The critical question for the court was the characterization of the speech that the law promoted. Because advocacy by LSC grantees to change welfare laws was not in advance of the government's own message, the restriction placed on it essentially prohibited a form of private speech. The relationship that the Court set forth, Gozdor asserted, was that the restriction "distorted" private speech. That "distortion principle" was the main criticism of the article, as was Scalia's dissenting opinion.

Gozdor, agreeing with Scalia's dissent, wrote that the restriction did not create such a distortion of private speech because Congress had still permitted LSC to form affiliate organizations, which would be considered "legally separate." Notwithstanding the difficulty of an organization to classify itself as an "affiliate entity" of LSC, Gozdor argued that there was no real prevention of speech when there were ample alternative means of relaying the message.

Further, in attacking the distortion principle's application, Gozdor also argued against the principle as a legal concept in the first place: "Regardless of the Court's rationale for its distortion principle, determining a First Amendment violation by measuring whether the government used a subsidy 'in ways which distorted the medium's usual functioning' suggests that forum functions become unchangeable once created." He claimed the unworkability of the distortion principle in a hypothetical example, which would moot the very existence of the LSC: "Taking the Velazquez rationale to its logical ends, the LSC subsidy itself could become an unconstitutional speech restriction. If Congress substantially increased LSC appropriations in order to allow LSC to take all of its cases... the functioning of the legal system would be distorted because such a subsidy likely would result in a dramatic increase in the federal courts' caseloads." With that in mind, he concluded with a process by which the Court should have decided the case: a process leading to the upholding of the restriction by finding that LSC's purpose was in promoting the government's message in contrast to a diversity of private views.

An article by Jessica Sharpe in the North Carolina Law Review argued that Kennedy's majority opinion wrongly set forth the understanding of the role of an attorney. Sharpe criticized the Court's thesis that the role of the attorney is that of an advocate such that a restriction on the attorney served as a direct restriction of advocacy. That rationale, Sharpe argued, could undermine the balance of abortion restrictions because state regulations on abortion access also could be seen as an intrusion into doctor–patient speech. Because Velazquez "blurred" this distinction, the privileged nature of doctor–patient conversations could be subjected to future regulations and limitations.

== See also ==
- Legal meaning of 'Forum'
- List of United States Supreme Court cases involving the First Amendment
