= Government speech =

U.S. constitutional law doctrine

The government speech doctrine, in American constitutional law, says that the government is not infringing the free speech rights of individual people when the government declines to use viewpoint neutrality in its own speech. More generally, the degree to which governments have free speech rights remains unsettled, including the degree of free speech rights that states may have under the First Amendment versus federal speech restrictions.

== Individual free speech rights versus government speech ==
The government speech doctrine establishes that the government may advance its speech without requiring viewpoint neutrality when the government itself is the speaker. Thus, when the state is the speaker, it may make content based choices. The simple principle has broad implications, and has led to contentious disputes within the Supreme Court.

The doctrine was implied in Wooley v. Maynard in 1977 when the Supreme Court acknowledged a legitimate government interest in communicating an official, ideologically partial message to the public. In the 1991 case of Rust v. Sullivan, government-funded doctors in a government health program were not allowed to advise patients on obtaining abortions, and the doctors challenged this law on Free Speech grounds. However, the Court held that because the program was government-funded, the doctors were, therefore, speaking on behalf of the government. Therefore, the government could say what it wishes, and “the Government has not discriminated based on viewpoint; it has merely chosen to fund one activity to the exclusion of the other."

In Legal Services Corp. v. Velazquez, the Supreme Court held that, although providing government-funded legal services appeared similar to government-funded doctors, the speech of the lawyers was private speech because lawyers spoke on behalf of their clients. As a result, the government could not prevent these attorneys from filing constitutional suits against the government.

== Free speech rights of states versus federal speech restrictions ==
When one sovereign tries to limit the speech of another sovereign, the First Amendment to the United States Constitution may protect the latter from the former. David Fagundes has argued that government speech deserves constitutional protection only where the speech is intrinsic to a public function and furthers democratic self-government.
