= Yisroel Schulman =

Yisroel Schulman, Esq. was the President & Attorney-in-Charge of the New York Legal Assistance Group (NYLAG), a 501 (c)(3) not-for-profit organization that provides free civil legal services to low-income New Yorkers. Prior to his inception of NYLAG, Mr. Schulman was a faculty member at the Benjamin N. Cardozo Law School of Yeshiva University. Concurrently, Mr. Schulman served as the Supervising Attorney for Cardozo Bet Tzedek Legal Services.
