= Legal Services of Northern California =

Legal Services of Northern California (LSNC) is a nonprofit organization that provides free civil legal assistance to low-income people and other vulnerable populations in 23 Northern California counties. It is a program of the Legal Services Corporation. The organization's service area stretches from the Nevada border to Solano County and from Sacramento to the Oregon border. It serves this large geographic area through eight field offices in the cities of Auburn, Chico, Eureka, Redding, Sacramento, Ukiah, Vallejo, and Woodland.
