= Title X =

Federal grant program

Family Planning Services and Population Research Act of 1970
- Other short titles: Title X of the Public Health Service Act
- Long title: An Act To promote public health and welfare by expanding, improving, and better coordinating the family planning services and population research activities of the Federal Government, and for other purposes.
- Nicknames: Title X
- Enacted by: the 91st United States Congress
- Effective: December 24, 1970

Citations
- Public law: Public Law 91-572
- Statutes at Large: 84 Stat. 1504

Codification
- Acts amended: Public Health Service Act of 1944
- U.S.C. sections created: 42 U.S.C. ch. 6A subch. VIII (§ 300 et seq.)

Legislative history
- Introduced in the Senate as S. 2108 by D‑MD Joseph Tydingsth on May 8, 1969; Committee consideration by Senate Committee on Labor and Public Welfare · House Committee on Interstate and Foreign Commerce; Passed the Senate on July 14, 1970 (Voice vote); Passed the House as the H.R. 11102 on December 8, 1970 (298–32); Reported by the joint conference committee on December 1970; agreed to by the House on December 10, 1970 (Agreed to conference report) and by the Senate on December 10, 1970 (Voice vote (agreed to conference report)); Signed into law by President Richard Nixon on December 24, 1970

United States Supreme Court cases
- Rust v. Sullivan (1991)

The Family Planning Services and Population Research Act of 1970 (enacted as Title X of the Public Health Service Act) is the only federal grant program dedicated to providing individuals with comprehensive family planning and related preventive health services. It was signed into law by President Richard Nixon on December 24, 1970.

Title X is legally designed to prioritize the needs of low-income families or uninsured people (including those who are not eligible for Medicaid) who might not otherwise have access to these health care services. These services are provided to low-income and uninsured individuals at reduced or no cost. Its overall purpose is to promote positive birth outcomes and healthy families by allowing individuals to decide the number and spacing of their children. In 2018, the program served 3.9 million people, 87% of them women.

Between 2014 and 2019, Title X Family Planning program received $286 million per year. From the start, Title X funds could not be used to support abortion. In 2019, the regulations were revised, making it harder for clinics that refer women to an abortion provider to receive Title X funds. In January 2021, President Joe Biden signed a presidential memorandum that called for the repeal of former President Donald Trump's Title X rule changes.

== History ==
The first federal subsidies to help low-income families with birth control came in 1965 as part of President Lyndon Johnson's War on Poverty program. By 1969, both Congress and President Richard Nixon supported a bill that will provide adequate Family Planning services. In 1970, the Senate passed Title X unanimously, and the House voted 298 to 32 to pass the bill on to Nixon, who signed it into law. While in 1971 the federal budget for Family Planning was only six million dollars, by 1972 it was almost 62 million.

In 1972, Congress passed a bill requiring a state's Medicaid program to cover family planning services for low income families. Under this provision, the federal government covers 90% of the states' expenditures. A third bill was passed in 1975 authorizing a network of family planning centers to be built across the U.S., resulting in almost 4,000 service sites in 2018.

== Mandate ==
Title X is administered by the Office of Population Affairs (OPA). According to OPA, Title X operates by granting funds to a network of community-based clinics that provide contraceptive services, related counseling, and other preventive health services. Typical grantees include State and local health departments, tribal organizations, hospitals, university health centers, independent clinics, community health centers, faith-based organizations, and various public and private nonprofit entities. In 2018, 99 agencies received Title X funding, supporting almost 4,000 service sites in the U.S., including 8 U.S. territories. OPA estimates that there is at least one clinic receiving Title X funding in 75% of counties in the U.S.

Ten Public Health Service Regional Offices are given the Title X funding and subsequently award regional service and training grant funds through a competitive review process. These offices also monitor program performance. Planned Parenthood clinics and affiliates receive about 60 million annually through the federal programs, serving 40 percent of all Title X patients.

According to the CDC, family planning services include contraception to reduce unintended pregnancy, pregnancy testing and counseling, basic infertility services, preconception health care, and sexually transmitted disease (STD) services. Services provided by Title X grantees include family planning and provision of contraception, education and counseling, breast and pelvic exams, breast and cervical cancer screening, screenings and treatment for sexually transmitted infections (STIs) and Human Immunodeficiency Virus (HIV), education about preventing STIs and HIV and counseling for affected patients, referrals to other health care resources, pregnancy diagnosis, and pregnancy counseling.

In addition to providing these services, Title X works to improve the overall quality of family planning services offered in the U.S. and help grantees better respond to patient needs. Title X funds training for family planning clinic staff through five national training programs that focus on clinical training; service delivery; management and systems improvement; coordination and strategic initiatives; and quality assurance/improvement and evaluation. Training also emphasizes application of the quality family planning guidelines. Title X also looks to improve the provision of family planning services by engaging in data collection and research of the program and its grantees. Finally, Title X funds also aid in disseminating information and implementing outreach and education activities in communities.

== Funding ==
Title X is funded every fiscal year by Congressional appropriations. In FY2010, it received approximately $317 million in appropriations and enacted spending. Since then, the appropriated budget has been below $300 million per year, with a $286 million yearly budget between 2014 and 2019.

Title X receives further funding from Medicaid reimbursements and additional federal sources. Combined with Congressional appropriations, these funding sources amount to over half of the operational funds provided to Title X grantees. The remainder of the funding comes from State and local funds, in addition to private sources like insurance and some patient fees.

== Impact ==
Title X has served millions of people throughout the years; according to HHS estimates, in 2018 alone Title X served 3.9 million family planning clients seen through 6.5 million encounters. Title X program serves mainly low income and young population. In 2015 it has helped reduce teenage pregnancies by 44% and prevented more than 188,000 unintended pregnancies. Without publicly funded family planning services, the number of unintended pregnancies and abortions in the United States would be nearly two-thirds higher among women overall as well as teens; the number of unintended pregnancies among poor women would nearly double. In 2018, Title X funding was used to cover more than 600,000 tests for cervical cancer, more than 800,000 tests for breast cancer, and almost 5 million tests for STDs.

The services provided at publicly funded clinics saved the federal and state governments an estimated $5.1 billion in 2008 in short term medical costs. Nationally, every $1.00 invested in helping women avoid unintended pregnancy saved $3.74 in Medicaid expenditures that otherwise would have been needed.

According to President Obama's FY2012 proposed budget and the OMB, Title X provides grants to a network of over 4,500 clinics that annually serve over 5 million individuals. The OPA describes their clientele as racially and ethnically diverse, with most patients in their 20s. Title X mainly serves low- to middle-income women, but has stepped up its efforts to involve men in family planning efforts and the number of male clients is on the rise.

In February 2011, a National Public Radio (NPR) article evaluated the impact of Title X. NPR cites a Guttmacher Institute report claiming that Title X grantee clinics serve 15% of women in the U.S. who use contraceptive prescriptions and supplies or get annual contraception check-ups. Furthermore, only five percent of patients served by Title X funding at these clinics came in solely for birth control. Nearly 90% also received preventive gynecological attention, and over 50% were treated for STIs or reproductive tract infections or related conditions.

Title X clinics and funding may represent the sole source of health care services for many of their clients. Of the 5.2 million patients served in 2009, 70% were below the federal poverty line and around 66% had no health insurance. In 2006, over 60% of women who received health care services at a Title X clinic identified that as their usual source of health care.

== Abortion ==
Since its inception, Title X has not directly provided funds for programs that use abortion as a family planning method. At the same time, by preventing unintended pregnancies, Title X has decreased the number of abortions in the United States.

Title X grantees and sub-recipients must be in full compliance with Section 1008 of the Title X statute and 42 CFR 59.5(a)(5), which prohibit abortion as a method of family planning. Grantees and sub-recipients must have written policies that clearly indicate that none of the funds will be used in programs where abortion is a method of family planning. Additional guidance on this topic can be found in the July 3, 2000, Federal Register Notice entitled Provision of Abortion-Related Services in Family Planning Services Projects, which is available at 65 Fed. Reg. 41281, and the final rule entitled Standards of Compliance for Abortion-Related Services in Family Planning Services Projects, which is available at 65 Fed. Reg. 41270.

Despite the broad bipartisan support for Title X in 1970, in 2011 Title X became entangled with the abortion debate, during negotiations about funding for the government's programs, as well as the proposed FY2012 budget.

Abortion opponents took issue with Title X since 25% of all Title X money went to Planned Parenthood affiliates, and Planned Parenthood clinics are the nation's biggest private abortion providers. Although Planned Parenthood is prohibited from using federal funds to perform abortions, abortion opponents argue that any money given to Planned Parenthood from Title X frees up more nonfederal money that can be used to perform abortions. Representative, and later Vice President, Mike Pence, a Republican from Indiana, has led the charge to prevent Planned Parenthood from receiving Title X funds. House Republicans called for cuts of over $300 million from Title X for FY2011 in order to reduce the number of abortions.

In June 2019, the Trump administration was allowed by a federal court of appeals to implement, while legal appeals continued, a policy restricting taxpayer dollars given to family planning facilities through Title X.

The final Title X Rule, as issued by the Department of Health and Human Services on 22 February 2019, prohibited the use of Title X funds to perform, promote, refer for, or support abortion as a method of family planning. However, nondirective pregnancy counseling, including nondirective counseling on abortion, was permitted. More details on the final rules can be found on the Fact Sheet released by the Department of Health and Human Services.

As a result of the new rule, some groups withdrew from the program in August 2019, including Maine Family Planning and Planned Parenthood, which had been providing Title X birth control services to 1.5 million women.

== Sterilization ==
Marie Sanchez, chief tribal judge on the Northern Cheyenne Reservation, arrived in Geneva in 1977 with a clear message to deliver to the United Nations Convention on Indigenous Rights. American Indian women, she argued, were targets of the “modern form” of genocide—sterilization. Over a six-year period following passage of the act, "physicians sterilized perhaps 25% of Native American women of childbearing age, and there is evidence suggesting that the numbers were actually even higher."

== Restoration ==
On January 28, 2021, President Joe Biden signed a presidential memorandum instructing the United States Department of Health and Human Services to review "undue restrictions" to Title X and to then "suspend, revise, or rescind" the Trump-era overhaul to Title X. On April 14, 2021, the U.S. Department of Health and Human Services released its Title X revision proposals. On October 4, 2021, the United States Department of Health and Human Services issued a regulation repealing the Title X gag rule effective November 8, 2021.

== See also ==
- Contraceptive mandate
- Rust v. Sullivan
- Domestic policy of the second Trump administration § Sex and gender
