= Legal Services Corporation =

US non-profit legal-aid company

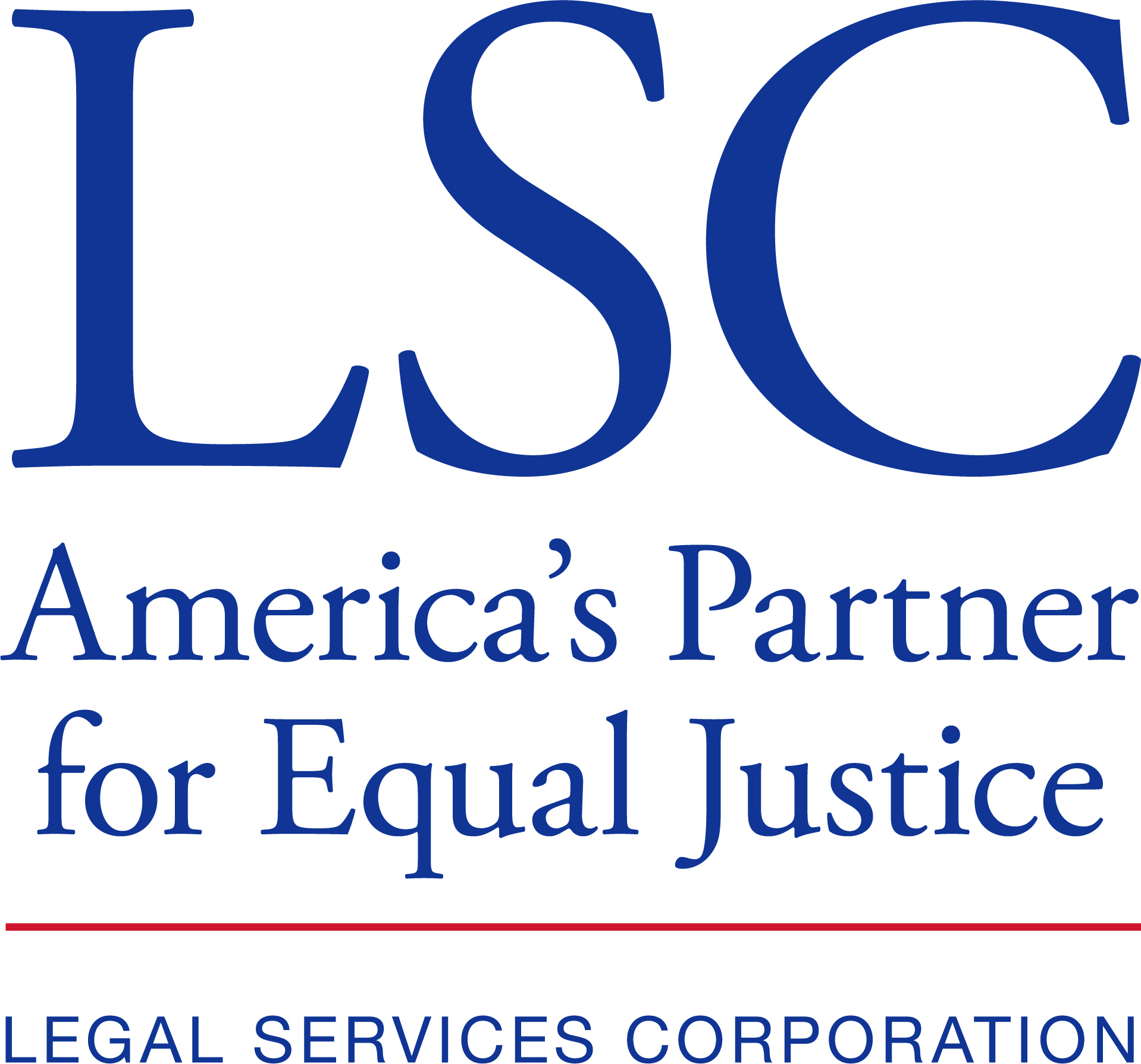
- Founded: July 25, 1974; 52 years ago
- Founder: United States Congress
- Type: 501(c)(3)
- Purpose: Promoting equal access to justice and providing grants for high-quality civil legal assistance to low-income Americans
- Location: Washington, D.C., United States
- Origins: LSC Act of 1974
- Region served: United States
- Method: Many state-level grantee programs
- Key people: Ronald S. Flagg, President; John G. Levi, Chair of Board of Directors
- Budget: $560 million federal appropriation (2023)
- Website: www.lsc.gov

Legal Services Corporation Act of 1974
- Long title: An Act to amend the Economic Opportunity Act of 1964 to provide for the transfer of the legal services program from the Office of Economic Opportunity to a Legal Services Corporation, and for other purposes.
- Enacted by: the 93rd United States Congress

Citations
- Public law: Pub. L. 93-355
- Statutes at Large: 88 Stat. 378

Legislative history
- Signed into law by President Richard Nixon on July 25, 1974

The Legal Services Corporation (LSC) is a publicly funded, 501(c)(3) non-profit corporation established by the United States Congress. It seeks to ensure equal access to justice under the law for all Americans by funding organizations providing civil legal aid to those who otherwise would be unable to afford it. LSC was created in 1974 with bipartisan congressional sponsorship and the support of the Nixon administration and is funded through the congressional appropriations process.

LSC has a board of eleven directors, appointed by the president of the United States and confirmed by the United States Senate, that set LSC policy. By law, the board is bipartisan; no more than six members can come from the same party. LSC has a president and other officers who implement policies and oversee the corporation's operations.

By law, LSC's headquarters are located in Washington, D.C. In the 1970s and 1980s, LSC also had regional offices. LSC currently has one office in Washington, D.C. that administers all of LSC's work.

LSC is the largest single funder of civil legal aid in the country, distributing more than 90 percent of its total funding to 132 independent nonprofit legal aid programs. For Fiscal Year 2023, Congress appropriated $560 million to LSC to fund civil legal aid.

== History ==
=== Background ===
LSC is one of the organizational descendants of the former Office of Economic Opportunity (OEO). The Economic Opportunity Act of 1964, a key part of President Lyndon B. Johnson's Great Society vision, established the OEO. Building on the work of a 1964 essay, "The War on Poverty: A Civilian Perspective" by Edgar Cahn and Jean Camper Cahn, in 1965 OEO budgeted $1 million per year to create and fund 269 local legal services programs around the country, such as California Rural Legal Assistance, which made a name for themselves suing local officials and sometimes stirring up resentment against their federal funding. Jean Cahn was the first director of the National Legal Services Program in OEO.

By the early 1970s, the Nixon administration began dismantling the OEO; funding for legal services for the poor began to wither, and supporters looked for an alternative arrangement. In 1971 a bipartisan congressional group, including Senators Ted Kennedy, William A. Steiger, and Walter Mondale, proposed a national, independent Legal Services Corporation; at the same time, administration officials such as Attorney General John N. Mitchell and chief domestic advisor John Ehrlichman were proposing their own somewhat similar solution.

=== Creation and the Ford era ===
The idea behind the LSC was to create a new corporate entity that would be funded by Congress but run independently, with eleven board members to be appointed by the president, subject to Senate confirmation.

LSC was created by the Legal Services Corporation Act of 1974 (Pub. L. 93–355). The LSC Act contains certain rules and restrictions regarding what LSC grantees can do. The initial budget was set at $90 million.

Naming and confirmation of the first LSC board was delayed by inaction and opposition, but by July 1975, President Gerald R. Ford had named and the Senate had approved the first board, with Cornell University Law School Dean Roger Conant Cramton as its first chair. South Dakota legal services lawyer and prosecutor Bill Janklow was another member of the initial board. Thomas Ehrlich, at the time the dean of Stanford Law School, became the LSC's first president.

=== Carter era ===
In December 1977, President Jimmy Carter nominated Hillary Rodham to the board of directors of the LSC, for a term to expire in July 1980. Rodham, an attorney with Rose Law Firm in Little Rock, Arkansas and the wife of Arkansas Attorney General Bill Clinton, had a background in children's law and policy and had worked in providing legal services for the poor while at Yale Law School. She had also done 1976 campaign coordination work for Carter in Indiana. This was a recess appointment, so Rodham took her place on the board without immediate Senate confirmation. Rodham was nominated again in January 1978 as a regular appointment. In mid-1978, the Carter administration chose the thirty-year-old Rodham to become chair of the board, the first woman to become so. The position entailed her traveling monthly from Arkansas to Washington, D.C., for two-day meetings.

During Rodham's Senate confirmation hearings, she subscribed to the philosophy that LSC should seek to reform laws and regulations that it viewed as "unresponsive to the needs of the poor." Rodham was successful in getting increases in Congressional funding for LSC, stressing its usual role in providing low-income people with attorneys to assist them in commonplace legal issues and framed its funding as being neither a liberal nor a conservative cause. By her third year on the LSC board, Rodham had gotten the LSC budget tripled. Opposition to LSC during this time came from both Republican Congressman James Sensenbrenner, who favored a "judicare" approach of compensating private lawyers for work done for the poor, and Conservative Caucus head Howard Phillips, who objected to LSC representing gays.

LSC funding was at its highest-ever mark, in inflation adjusted dollars, in fiscal 1980, with a budget of $303 million. Some 6,200 poverty lawyers filed suits using its funds on behalf of 1.5 million eligible poor clients; the lawyers won almost 80 percent of their cases, which mostly involved divorces, evictions, repossessions, and interrupted payments from federal agencies. For fiscal 1981 it was budgeted at $321 million.

In June 1980, Carter renominated Rodham for another term on the board, to expire in July 1983. Sometime between about April 1980 and September 1980, F. William McCalpin replaced her as chair of the board. He would remain chair through late 1981.

=== Reagan era ===
LSC was strongly opposed by some political groups. As Governor of California in the 1960s, Ronald Reagan had advocated elimination of all federal subsidies for free legal services to the poor in civil cases, and had tried to block a grant to California Rural Legal Assistance in 1970. Indeed, Time magazine would state, "Of all the social programs growing out of the Great Society, there is none that Ronald Reagan dislikes more than the Legal Services Corporation." The CRLA's executive director would characterize Reagan's attitude towards the organization as akin to that of Darth Vader.

When President Reagan took office in January 1981, he attempted to eliminate the LSC by zero funding it. Supporters of LSC rallied to defend it; American Bar Association president W. Reece Smith, Jr. led 200 lawyers to Washington to press its case. In response to Reagan's clear intentions against the LSC, the Coalition for Legal Services was formed to lobby outside, but on behalf of the LSC, which showed support via grant recipients.

The U.S. House Judiciary Committee blocked Reagan's zero-funding action in May 1981, but did cut financing to $260 million for both of the next two years as well as place additional restrictions on LSC lawyers. By the following month, the now Republican-controlled U.S. Senate Labor and Human Resources Committee had cut proposed financing to $100 million, as part of what The New York Times deemed an "increasingly bitter ideological struggle". Moreover, Reagan administration officials accused LSC of having "concealed and understated" its lobbying activity and support for politically motivated legislation.

In November 1981, the Reagan administration, although still hoping to eliminate LSC, decided to replace all eleven LSC board members with nominations of their own. In return the LSC began to set up "mirror corporations" to circumvent congressional restrictions and reuse funds for political advocacy. The proposed new chairman was Ronald Zumbrun, president of the ideologically opposite Pacific Legal Foundation, which had previously defended the state of California against several legal aid lawsuits. For fiscal 1982, LSC's budget was reduced by 25 percent to $241 million, with new rules prohibiting most class action suits and lobbying. Zumbrun's nomination was sufficiently controversial that in January 1982, the Reagan administration dropped it, and instead made a recess appointment of William J. Olson to be chair. Olson had headed the Reagan transition team dealing with LSC and had personally recommended its abolition, so LSC advocates were not mollified.

At the same time, the Reagan administration had named six other board members as recess appointments. In February 1982, the Carter-appointed members of the previously existing board filed suit to against the recess appointments, claiming they were unlawful and that they should be enjoined from holding meetings. Rodham hired fellow Rose Law Firm associate Vince Foster to represent her in the case and to seek a restraining order against Reagan. The Reagan nominees may have been prohibited from meeting with the Legal Service Corporation before confirmation.

Rodham also prodded Senate Democrats to vote against Reagan's nominees. The nominees did undergo heavy criticism in Congress, with one labeled a bigot and Olson lambasted for his transition position. In March 1982, yet another new chair was named, Indiana University law professor William F. Harvey, although Olson would remain on the board. Harvey and Rodham had a conference call in which Rodham reiterated her desire for the lawsuit. That action, McCalpin v. Dana, was decided in favor of the defendants by summary judgment in October 1982.

By December 1982, the Senate was willing to confirm six of Reagan's more moderate nominees, but not Harvey, Olson, and another; the Reagan administration instead pulled the names of all of them. This board then closed its last meeting in a public debacle, with Olson lambasting LSC as full of "abuses and rampant illegality" and a "waste of the taxpayers' money through the funding of the left," while being harangued by a hostile audience. And too, the Reagan appointees to the board were being criticized for collecting substantially higher fees than previous board members.

In September 1983 the General Accounting Office found that in early 1981, LSC officials and its local affiliates had used federal funds in assembling opposition to Reagan's efforts to eliminate LSC, and that this use had been in violation of the LSC Act's restrictions against such political activity. Such actions against the LSC Act were not crimes, and the GAO report did not claim any crimes had taken place. The investigation had been initiated by the LSC in 1983 ordering a series of "raids" on their own offices to attempt to discover evidence of questionable actions taken by the LSC in 1981, prompting Time magazine to declare LSC "an organization at war with itself."

More recess appointments were made by Reagan in late 1983, in 1984, and in early 1985, with again none of them being confirmed by the Senate. Indeed, LSC's board would go a total of three and a half years populated by recess appointments. Finally in June 1985 the Senate confirmed the latest batch of Reagan nominations. The Carter board lawsuit, since renamed and appealed as McCalpin v. Durant to the United States Court of Appeals, District of Columbia Circuit, was then decided later in June 1985 as moot.

=== George H. W. Bush era ===
Overt White House hostility towards LSC ended with the George H. W. Bush administration, with calls for level funding rather than decreases. Under board chair George Wittgraff, LSC began to ease relations with private lawyers and with state grantees. In fiscal 1992, LSC saw a funding increase back to $350 million.

=== Clinton era ===
Hillary Rodham's husband, the aforementioned Bill Clinton, took office as U.S. president in January 1993. The first two years of the Clinton administration saw more growth for LSC, as former chair McCalpin returned to the board and the former chair Hillary was now First Lady of the United States. Funding rose to a high mark in absolute terms of $400 million for fiscal years 1994 and 1995.

Things turned upon the advent of the Republican Revolution. In fiscal 1996, once the Republican party had taken over Congress the year prior, LSC had its funding cut again, from $400 million to $278 million. A new set of much more extensive restrictions were added to LSC grantees. The organization's supporters expressed disappointment that the Clinton administration did not make LSC a critical priority in its budget battles with the Republican Congress, especially given Hillary Clinton's former role in it.

As part of a comprehensive "welfare reform" of federal welfare laws beginning in 1996, most significantly the Personal Responsibility and Work Opportunity Act, Congress imposed restrictions on the types of work that LSC grantee legal services organizations could engage in. For example, LSC-funded organizations could no longer serve as counsel in class action lawsuits challenging the way public benefits are administered. Additionally, LSC grantees faced tightened restrictions on representing immigrants, specifically those illegally in the country. However, in 2001, the restriction on welfare advocacy was ruled unconstitutional in Legal Services Corp. v. Velazquez.

However, non-LSC funded organizations are not subject to these restrictions leading the legal services community to adopt a two-track approach: LSC restricted counsel taking on individual clients but not engaging in class actions, and non-restricted counsel (using private donor funding) both taking on individuals as well as engaging in otherwise restricted litigation. Poverty lawyers in both tracks still work together where they can, being careful not to run afoul of LSC restrictions.

=== George W. Bush era ===
In 2004, veteran Legal Aid Society attorney Helaine M. Barnett was named President of the LSC.

According to LSC's 2009 report "Documenting the Justice Gap in America: The Current Unmet Civil Legal Needs of Low-Income Americans," all legal aid offices nationwide, LSC-funded or not, were together able to meet only about 20 percent of the estimated legal needs of low-income people in the United States.

For 2007, LSC had a budget of some $350 million.

=== Obama era ===
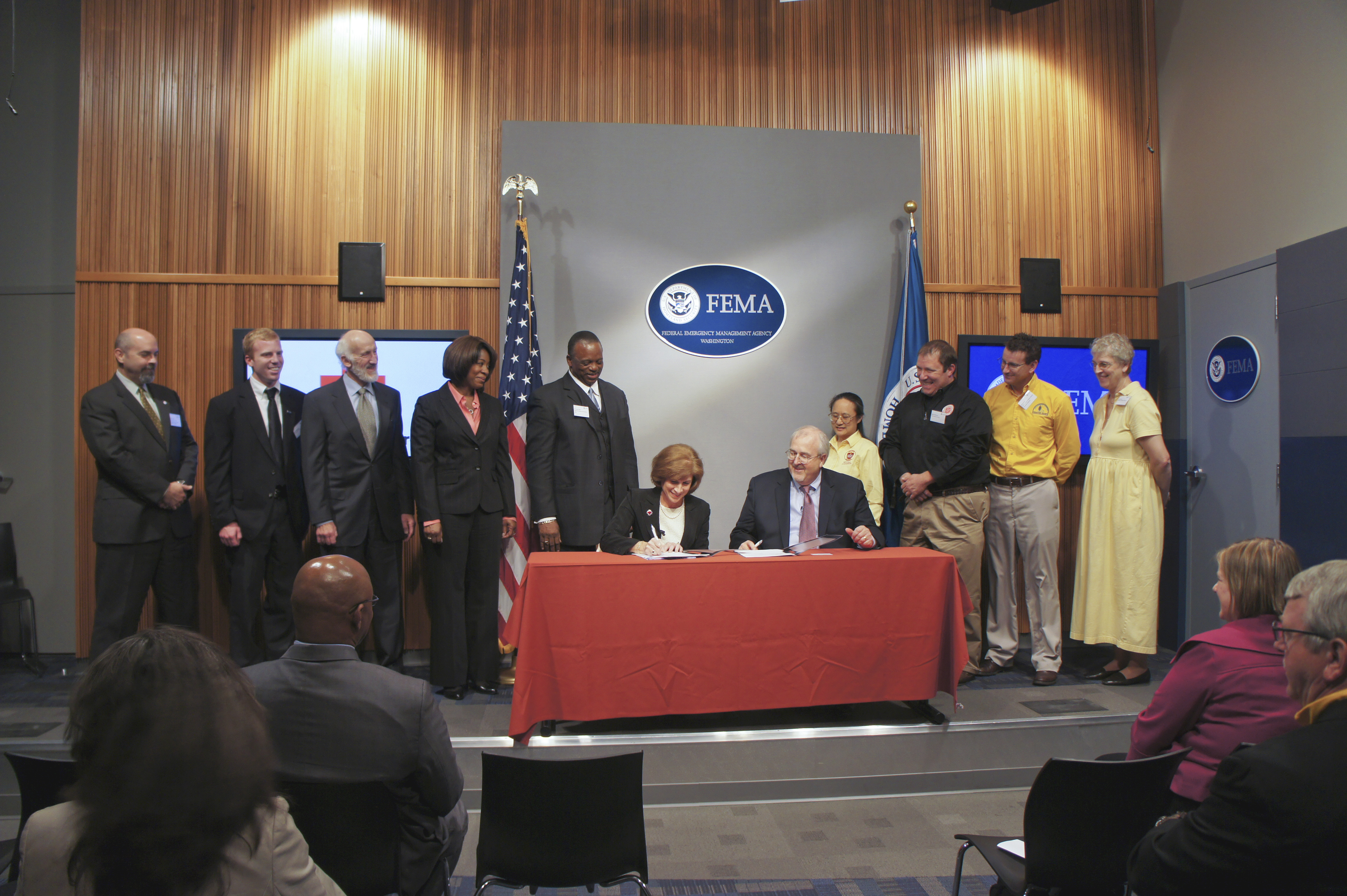
John Eidleman, Senior Program Counsel of Legal Services Corporation, standing next to Federal Emergency Management Agency Administrator W. Craig Fugate and American Red Cross President and CEO Gail J. McGovern in Washington, D.C., on October 22, 2010.

In 2009 during the Obama administration, the LSC was on the path to getting a $50 million increase in its $390 million budget.

However, the LSC came under criticism from Senator Charles Grassley, who said, "There's just a lot of money being wasted," citing several General Accounting Office and Inspector General reports. At the same time, Congress rolled back the restriction that LSC-funded attorneys could not take attorneys' fees-generating cases; LSC finalized the regulation in 2010 after President Obama signed an appropriations bill into law.

By fiscal 2011, the annual budget amount for the LSC was $420 million. In early 2011, House now-majority Republican proposed a $75 million reduction in that current-year amount, while Obama's suggestion budget proposed a $30 million increase for the subsequent year.

On December 16, 2014, President Obama signed into law the Consolidated and Further Continuing Appropriations Act for FY 2015 that includes $375 million for LSC.

=== Trump era ===
From its inception in 2017, President Trump's administration repeatedly called for the elimination of funding for LSC. LSC has strong bipartisan support on behalf of robust funding for LSC. External stakeholders, including members of the legal and business communities, state attorneys general, and law school deans across the country sent letters to the House and Senate appropriations committees advocating for robust funding for LSC. They included:

- 252 General Counsels from some of the largest American businesses, including Apple, American Express, Google, Walmart, General Motors, and Walt Disney.
- 181 law firms from all 50 states and the District of Columbia.
- The Conference of Chief Justices and the Conference of State Court Administrators.
- 41 bipartisan state Attorneys General.
- 167 Deans of law schools.

In addition, 209 members of the House of Representatives signed a bipartisan letter in support of funding for LSC, the largest number in history, and 46 bipartisan Senators signed a similar letter in support of funding for LSC. Ultimately, Trump signed into law increases in LSC funding during his tenure. Throughout Trump's presidency, Congress increased LSC's funding such that it eventually reached $490 million in Fiscal Year 2020, aided partly by a $50 million emergency supplement from the CARES Act. In the Consolidated Appropriations Act, 2021, Congress appropriated $465 million in Fiscal Year 2021 for LSC; this amount was an increase of $25 million over LSC's baseline appropriation (without the CARES Act supplement) of $440 million in the prior fiscal year.

=== Biden era ===
In 2021, President Joe Biden proposed a $600 million budget appropriation for LSC.

In March 2022, Congress passed an FY2022 appropriations bill in which they allocated $489 million to LSC.

Later in 2022, LSC asked for $1.26 billion for Fiscal Year 2023 and Biden proposed $700 million. Ultimately, for FY2023, Congress passed an FY2023 approprations bill in which they allocated $560 million to LSC, the highest ever real dollar amount appropriated to LSC.

=== Second Trump era ===
In Trump's second term, the administration's FY2026 proposed budget again proposed eliminating funding for LSC. In January of 2026, LSC's funding was renewed for FY2026 with a 3.6% cut from its 2025 funding level.

== Restrictions ==
Due to the up-and-down nature of LSC's political history, there are many restrictions on lobbying, advocacy, and general impact work which apply to LSC-funded organizations. Here they are broken into categories of expressly forbidden, forbidden with LSC funds, and expressly permitted.

Recipients may never:

- Publicly identify LSC or the recipient with any partisan or nonpartisan political activity or a candidate for office, or encourage others to do so (45 CFR 1608.4)
- Staff attorneys may not use their position or authority to influence elections or coerce anyone to contribute to a political cause (45 CFR 1608.5)
- Run for office (45 CFR 1608.5(c))
- Register, transport to polls, or otherwise assist voters in election-related activities (45 CFR 1608.6)
- Use non-LSC funds for anything prohibited by the LSC Act, unless it is specifically allowed in 45 CFR 1610.4, 1610.6, or 1610.7 (45 CFR 1610.3)
- Lobby. In the language of the regulation, recipient organizations may not attempt to influence the passage or defeat of a bill, constitutional amendment, initiative, referendum, executive order, or provision which appropriates funds or defines the functions or authority of LSC or the recipient (45 CFR 1612.3).

- This includes using resources from a recipient organization to support lobbying efforts on employees' own time – don't even take an envelope! (45 CFR 1612.3(c))
- The caveat is that organizations may lobby at the State and local level with non-LSC funds regarding funding for their organization (45 CFR 1612.6(f)).

- Grassroots lobby (45 CFR 1612.4)
- During working hours or with resources provided by an LSC-funded organization, employees may not participate or encourage others to participate in public demonstrations, boycotts, picketing, or strikes. This must be on personal time (45 CFR 1612.7(a)).
- Employees of recipients may never engage in rioting or civil disturbances, actions which violate a court-imposed injunction, or take part in illegal activity of any kind (45 CFR 1612.7(b))
- Support or conduct training sessions which advocate particular public policies, encourage or facilitate prohibited political activities, disseminate information about such policies or activities, or train participants to engage in prohibited activities (45 CFR 1612.8(a))
- Form or organize an association, labor union, or other similar organization. This is distinct from holding informational meetings for attorneys or forming organizations of eligible clients for advice on service delivery (both of which are allowed). You may also advise your clients on the legal procedures for forming these types of organizations themselves, and even help them with documents like bylaws (45 CFR 1612.9).
- Represent clients in criminal proceedings (unless you are appointed by a court or a situation arises out of your representation of the client in a civil case) (45 CFR 1613)
- Initiate or participate in a class action suit (45 CFR 1617.3), although you may represent individuals who want to remove themselves from the suit or have not received the settlement ordered by the court (45 CFR 1617.2(b)(2)).
- Provide legal assistance to ineligible aliens (45 CFR 1626.3; see 45 CFR 1626.5 to judge eligibility), unless the alien in question is, or is the parent of someone subject to battery or extreme cruelty by a spouse, parent, or member of their spouse's or parent's family residing in the same household. In this case, non-LSC funds must be used for the case (45 CFR 1626.4).
- Participate in any activity related to the redistricting of a legislative, judicial, or elective district at any level of government (45 CFR 1632.3)
- Defend clients in eviction proceedings from a public housing unit if that client has been charged with or convicted of the sale, distribution, or manufacture of controlled substances, or of possession with the intent to sell or distribute (45 CFR 1633.3)
- Participate in civil litigation on behalf of an incarcerated person, as plaintiff or defendant, nor any administrative hearing challenging the conditions of incarceration (45 CFR 1637.3)
- Represent, nor refer for representation by another recipient any client gained through in-person, unsolicited advice (45 CFR 1638.3)
- Participate in legislation, lobbying, or rulemaking involving efforts to reform Federal or State welfare systems (45 CFR 1639.3)

- LSC v. Velasquez (2001) was considered a victory by those trying to chip away at LSC regulations. It didn't change the overall prohibition, but it deleted the restriction barring litigation which attempts to change welfare law in the context of representing an individual client (45 CFR 1693.4).

Recipients may, with non-LSC funding:

In many of their regulations, LSC only states activities that their funding cannot be used to support. In 45 CFR 1610.2(c)–(h), however, several different types of non-LSC funding are defined:

"(c) IOLTA funds means funds derived from programs established by State court rules or
legislation that collect and distribute interest on lawyers' trust accounts.
(d) Non-LSC funds means funds derived from a source other than the Corporation.
(e) Private funds means funds derived from an individual or entity other than a
governmental source or LSC.
(f) Public funds means non-LSC funds derived from a Federal, State, or local government or
instrumentality of a government. For purposes of this part, IOLTA funds shall be treated in
the same manner as public funds...
(h) Tribal funds means funds received from an Indian tribe or from a private nonprofit
foundation or organization for the benefit of Indians or Indian tribes."

With these definitions in mind, 45 CFR 1610.4 goes on to specify what each type of funding can be used for:

- Tribal funds can be used for whatever purpose they were granted (45 CFR 1610.4(a))
- Public, IOLTA, and Private funds can be used for whatever purpose they were granted, as long as it doesn't violate LSC's regulations (45 CFR 1610.4(b)-(c))
- Non-LSC funds generally can be used to assist clients who are not financially eligible under LSC guidelines (45 CFR 1610.4(d))

In addition, the category of general non-LSC funds may be used to:

- Support a political party, association, candidate, ballot measure, initiative, or referendum – but not during working hours or at the recipient's office location (45 CFR 1608.3(b))
- Respond to a written request from an agency, legislative body, elected official, etc. to participate in rulemaking or to provide oral or written testimony in order to provide information which may include analysis and/or comments on legislation (45 CFR 1612.6(a))

- However, you can only provide your testimony to the requesting party or parties – it cannot be distributed to a wider audience (45 CFR 1612.6(b));
- You may not arrange for the written request (45 CFR 1612.6(c));
- And, you must report this activity to LSC (45 CFR 1612.6(d)).

- Recipients may also provide oral or written comments to an agency in a public rulemaking session without having been requested (45 CFR 1612.6(e))
- Lobby at the State or local level regarding the recipient's funding (45 CFR 1612.6(f))
- Assist an ineligible alien or their child who has been subjected to battery and/ or extreme cruelty by the alien's parent, spouse, or a member of the parent's or spouse's family residing in the same household as the alien. To qualify, the alien him- or herself cannot have participated in the abuse, and the representation must be related to preventing or ending the abuse (45 CFR 1626.4(a)).
- Comment in a public rulemaking proceeding or respond to a written request for testimony in a legislative session or committee meeting concerning welfare reform (45 CFR 1639.5)
- Participate in legal activity which seeks to obtain or compel an individual or institution to provide or assist with euthanasia or assisted suicide (45 CFR 1643.3) or a "nontherapeutic abortion" (term not defined) (LSC Act §1007(b)(8) or the 1996 Appropriations Act §504(a)(14))
- Participate in legal activity seeking to desegregate elementary or secondary schools (LSC Act §1007(b)(9))
- Participate in legal activity relating to violation(s) of the Military Selective Service Act or desertion from the Armed Forces of the United States (LSC Act §1007 (b)(10))

Recipients may, with any funding:

- Accept fee-generating cases in situations in which local pro bono attorneys or the referral service are not viable options (45 CFR 1609.3)

- In terms of accounting, fees garnered from these services must go into the same category as the recipient's LSC grant in the same proportion that LSC funds supported the activity (versus other funds) (45 CFR 1609.4)
- This regulation was changed in Section 533 of the 2010 Appropriations Act from a statutory prohibition (which had been implemented in the 1996 Appropriations Act Section 504(a))

- Accept reimbursement from clients for out-of-pocket expenses related to their case, if the client has agreed to pay ahead of time and in writing (45 CFR 1609.5(a))
- Represent eligible clients at the administrative level (45 CFR 1612.5(a))
- Initiate or participate in litigation challenging a governmental agency's rules, regulations, policies, etc. (45 CFR 1612.5(b))
- Communication with an agency to receive information (45 CFR 1612.5(c)(2))
- Informing clients, other recipients, etc. about new or proposed statutes, executive orders, or administrative regulations. Note that legislation is not listed here (45 CFR 1612.5(c)(3)).
- Contact LSC to comment on its rules (45 CFR 1612.5(c)(4))
- Advise a client of their right to contact an elected official (45 CFR 1612.5(c)(6))
- Provide assistance to eligible aliens (45 CFR 1626.5; also lists criteria for eligibility), as well as specific categories of other aliens (45 CFR 1626.10 and 1626.11)

== Current debates ==
From the LSC's inception, there has been disagreement among board members and more broadly as to the role of the LSC. During its creation, some felt the LSC should function similarly to the OEO, attacking broad underlying issues faced by poor people through lobbying and class action lawsuits. Others felt that the focus should be more narrowly defined to addressing individual legal issues. The LSC Act stated that the organization was to pursue "equal access to justice," but Cramton, the chair of the LSC, wrote that while the law was intended to proscribe the blatantly-political objects of the 1960s OEO's work, it was worded ambiguously.

Funding for the LSC has fluctuated dramatically over the organization's history, but as of 2018, had faced an overall decrease of 40% since the late 1980s. Lack of funding has triggered a shift toward funding limited or "unbundled" legal assistance programs for pro se litigants, rather than full legal representation, which has a much higher cost-per-client. Limited legal assistance programs funded by the LSC include self-help centers and hotlines. In 2014, LSC grant recipients aided about 1.9 million people at an average cost of $5.40 per client.

Additionally, decrease in funding for programs supporting low-income litigants at the federal level has led to more funding for limited legal assistance at the state level. For example, since the early 2000s, the California Judicial Committee has pioneered the court-based self-help center model, which has been implemented in many states across the country.

== Board of directors ==
The board of directors is composed of 11 members, who are appointed by the president of the United States with the consent of the United States Senate. Of these, majority must be members of the bar of the highest court of any state, and none can be a full-time employee of the federal government. No more than six of the members may be affiliated with the same political party. They are appointed to terms of three years, but they may continue to serve on the board until a successor is confirmed. A member may not serve more than three terms continuously.

The board elects a chairman from among its members annually.

The board appoints the president of the LSC, who must be a member of the bar of the highest court of a state. They serve as a non-voting ex officio member of the board. The current president of the LSC is Ronald S. Flagg, who was appointed effective February 20, 2020.

=== Current board members ===
The current board members as of May 24, 2026:

Position	Name	Party	Confirmed	Term expiration
Chair	John G. Levi	Democratic	March 19, 2010	July 13, 2020
Vice chair	Pius Pietrzyk	Republican	September 29, 2010	July 13, 2017
Member	Robert J. Grey Jr.	Democratic	March 19, 2010	July 13, 2020
Member	Abigail Lawlis Kuzma	Republican	August 1, 2019	July 13, 2022
Member	Victor B. Maddox	Republican	March 19, 2010	July 13, 2016
Member	John G. Malcolm	Republican	August 1, 2019	July 13, 2020
Member	Laurie Mikva	Democratic	June 19, 2009	July 13, 2016
Member	Frank X. Neuner Jr.	Republican	August 1, 2019	July 13, 2022
Member	Julie A. Reiskin	Democratic	September 29, 2010	July 13, 2019
Member	Gloria Valencia-Weber	Democratic	September 29, 2010	July 13, 2020
Member	Vacant			

=== Past chairs ===
The chairs of the LSC board throughout its history have included:

- Roger Conant Cramton
- Hillary Rodham
- F. William McCalpin
- William F. Harvey
- Robert Emmett McCarthy
- William C. Durant III
- George W. Wittgraf
- Douglas S. Eakeley
- Frank B. Strickland

== Grant recipients ==
Alabama

- Legal Services Alabama

Alaska

- Alaska Legal Services Corporation

American Samoa

- American Samoa Legal Aid
- Uunai Legal Services Clinic

Arizona

- Community Legal Services
- Southern Arizona Legal Aid
- DNA-Peoples Legal Services (an acronym for the Navajo phrase
  "Dinébe'iiná Náhiiłna be Agha'diit'ahii" which means "attorneys who
  work for the economic revitalization of The People": see )

Arkansas

- Legal Aid of Arkansas
- Center for Arkansas Legal Services

California

- California Indian Legal Services
- Greater Bakersfield Legal Assistance
- Central California Legal Services
- Legal Aid Foundation of Los Angeles
- Neighborhood Legal Services of Los Angeles County
- Inland Counties Legal Services
- Legal Services of Northern California
- Legal Aid Society of San Diego
- California Rural Legal Assistance
- Bay Area Legal Aid
- Legal Aid Society of Orange County

Colorado

- Colorado Legal Services

Connecticut

- Statewide Legal Services of Connecticut

Delaware

- Legal Services Corporation of Delaware

District of Columbia

- Neighborhood Legal Services Program of the District of Columbia

Florida

- Community Legal Services of Mid-Florida
- Florida Rural Legal Services
- Legal Services of Greater Miami
- Legal Services of North Florida
- Bay Area Legal Services
- Three Rivers Legal Services
- Coast to Coast Legal Aid of South Florida

Georgia

- Atlanta Legal Aid Society
- Georgia Legal Services Program

Guam

- Guam Legal Services Corporation

Hawaii

- Native Hawaiian Legal Corporation
- Legal Aid Society of Hawaii

Idaho

- Idaho Legal Aid Services

Illinois

- Legal Aid Chicago
- Land of Lincoln Legal Assistance Foundation
- Prairie State Legal Services

Indiana

- Indiana Legal Services

Iowa

- Iowa Legal Aid

Kansas

- Kansas Legal Services

Kentucky

- Legal Aid of the Bluegrass
- Legal Aid Society of Louisville
- Appalachian Research and Defense Fund of Kentucky
- Kentucky Legal Aid

Louisiana

- Acadiana Legal Service Corporation
- Southeast Louisiana Legal Services Corporation

Maine

- Pine Tree Legal Assistance

Maryland

- Legal Aid Bureau

Massachusetts

- Volunteer Lawyers Project of the Boston Bar Association
- South Coastal Counties Legal Services
- Northeast Legal Aid
- Community Legal Aid

Michigan

- Legal Services of South Central Michigan
- Legal Services of Eastern Michigan
- Legal Services of Northern Michigan
- Legal Aid of Western Michigan
- Legal Aid and Defender Association
- Michigan Indian Legal Services

Micronesia

- Micronesian Legal Services

Minnesota

- Legal Aid Service of Northeastern Minnesota
- Central Minnesota Legal Services
- Legal Services of Northwest Minnesota Corporation
- Southern Minnesota Regional Legal Services
- Anishinabe Legal Services

Mississippi

- North Mississippi Rural Legal Services
- Mississippi Center for Legal Services

Missouri

- Legal Aid of Western Missouri
- Legal Services of Eastern Missouri
- Mid-Missouri Legal Services Corporation
- Legal Services of Southern Missouri

Montana

- Montana Legal Services Association

Nebraska

- Legal Aid of Nebraska

Nevada

- Nevada Legal Services

New Hampshire

- Legal Advice & Referral Center

New Jersey

- Legal Services of Northwest Jersey
- South Jersey Legal Services
- Northeast New Jersey Legal Services Corporation
- Essex-Newark Legal Services Project
- Ocean-Monmouth Legal Services
- Central Jersey Legal Services

New Mexico

- New Mexico Legal Aid

New York

- Legal Aid Society of Northeastern New York
- Neighborhood Legal Services
- Nassau/Suffolk Law Services Committee
- Legal Services NYC
- Staten Island Legal Services
- Legal Assistance of Western New York
- Legal Aid Society of Mid-New York
- Legal Services of the Hudson Valley

North Carolina

- Legal Aid of North Carolina

North Dakota

- Legal Services of North Dakota

Ohio

- Community Legal Aid Services
- Legal Aid Society of Greater Cincinnati
- Legal Aid Society of Cleveland
- The Legal Aid Society of Columbus
- Ohio State Legal Services
- Legal Aid of Western Ohio
- Southeastern Ohio Legal Services

Oklahoma

- Oklahoma Indian Legal Services
- Legal Aid Services of Oklahoma

Oregon

- Legal Aid Services of Oregon

Pennsylvania

- Philadelphia Legal Assistance Center
- Laurel Legal Services
- MidPenn Legal Services
- Neighborhood Legal Services Association
- North Penn Legal Services
- Southwestern Pennsylvania Legal Services
- Northwestern Legal Services
- Legal Aid of Southeastern Pennsylvania

Puerto Rico

- Puerto Rico Legal Services
- Community Law Office

Rhode Island

- Rhode Island Legal Services

South Carolina

- South Carolina Legal Services

South Dakota

- East River Legal Services
- Dakota Plains Legal Services

Tennessee

- Legal Aid of East Tennessee
- Memphis Area Legal Services
- Legal Aid Society of Middle Tennessee and the Cumberlands
- West Tennessee Legal Services

Texas

- Legal Aid of NorthWest Texas
- Lone Star Legal Aid
- Texas RioGrande Legal Aid

Utah

- Utah Legal Services

Vermont

- Legal Services Law Line of Vermont

Virgin Islands

- Legal Services of the Virgin Islands

Virginia

- Southwest Virginia Legal Aid Society
- Legal Aid Society of Eastern Virginia
- Central Virginia Legal Aid Society
- Virginia Legal Aid Society
- Blue Ridge Legal Services
- Potomac Legal Aid Society

Washington

- Northwest Justice Project

West Virginia

- Legal Aid of West Virginia

Wisconsin

- Legal Action of Wisconsin
- Wisconsin Judicare

Wyoming

- Wyoming Legal Services

== See also ==
- State Justice Institute, another government-established non-profit that awards grants to improve the justice system
- Martha Bergmark
