= New York Legal Assistance Group =

- Abbreviation: NYLAG
- Founded: 1990
- Legal status: 501(c)(3)
- Purpose: NYLAG Provides free civil legal services to low-income New Yorkers.
- Headquarters: New York City
- Region served: New York City, Long Island, Westchester and Rockland Counties
- Website: http://www.nylag.org

The New York Legal Assistance Group (NYLAG) is a non-profit organization that provides free civil legal services to low-income New Yorkers. Its services include direct representation, case consultation, advocacy, community education, training, financial counseling, and impact litigation.

== Approach ==
NYLAG is able to provide services to undocumented immigrants, and individuals and families who earn above the government-designated poverty threshold because the agency does not accept Federal Legal Services Corporation funding. In the fiscal year ended June 30, 2017, NYLAG had a budget of $26 million, supplemented by partnerships with law firms and volunteers that donated over 100,000 hours in pro bono services, valued at over $26 million. On average, NYLAG provides services at an internal cost of $200 per client. In 2016, the agency served over 74,000 clients - over fifty per cent of whom were immigrants.

NYLAG has 150 community offices located in courts, hospitals, and community- based organizations in all five boroughs of New York City, Long Island and Westchester and Rockland Counties. The agency partners with 600 health and human services agencies, and provides cross-referrals.

The agency has a paid staff of 284 and uses the services of approximately 2,200 pro bono attorneys and other volunteers.

Populations Served: immigrants, children with special needs, victims of domestic violence, veterans, elderly, Holocaust survivors, LGBTQ, disabled, tenants, homeowners, victims of natural disasters, serious or chronically ill patients, and consumers.

In 2008, NYLAG filed a class action lawsuit with the Puerto Rican Legal Defense and Education Fund, suing the United States government for delays in the processing of Immigration Applications.
