= Texas Legal Services Center =

U.S. nonprofit organization

- Abbreviation: TLSC
- Formation: 1977
- Legal status: 501(c)(3) nonprofit organization
- Headquarters: Austin, Texas, United States
- President: John Shaw
- Vice-President: Ofelia Zapata
- Website: www.tlsc.org

Texas Legal Services Center (TLSC) is a nonprofit law firm that provides legal aid with free representation and assistance to Texans who qualify for their services based on income or other criteria. It also provides legal services to Texas residents who may not qualify for services from Texas Rio Grande Legal Aid, Lone Star Legal Aid, Legal Aid of Northwest Texas, or Disability Rights Texas. TLSC provides support services to each of those providers.

== Formation ==
Texas Legal Services Center was incorporated in 1977. Its legal name is Texas Legal Services Center, Inc. It is a 501c3 nonprofit corporation.

== Legal Help Projects ==
Texas Legal Services Center is composed of several legal help departments, each providing legal aid based on legal topics or demographics.

=== Legal Hotline for Texans ===
The Legal Hotline for Texans was the first program created by Texas Legal Services Center that directly assisted Texans with legal issues. On May 1, 1989, the "Legal Hotline for Older Texans" was started as a novel concept by providing legal advice to clients whom the attorney never met in person. In the Speaker's Committee Room news conference, Chief Justice Phillips joined State Bar president James Sales, Attorney General Jim Mattox, and legislative leaders in making the announcement. Former State Bar President W. Frank Newton was instrumental in securing a resolution of support from the State Bar Board of Directors in furtherance of the concept.

The Legal Hotline for Texans focuses on a specific demographic. It provides free legal advice to Texans age 60 or over and Texans of any age who would qualify to receive Medicare. That program provides advice on non-criminal law matters. Topics include: elder law, foreclosure defense, Medicaid law, fraud, credit card litigation, divorce, guardianship, public benefits (such as CHIP, SNAP, etc.), wills, landlord/tenant law, and housing.

=== Legal Aid for Survivors of Sexual Assault (LASSA) ===
Legal Aid for Survivors of Sexual Assault (LASSA) is a "collaborative effort of nine legal aid organizations partnering with domestic violence shelters, rape crisis centers, and colleges and universities throughout the state for community outreach, education, and referrals." Texas Legal Services Center attorneys provide legal advice and assistance with local referrals to the appropriate service providers based on the caller's situation and needs, be that a shelter, legal aid center, or education provider.

==== Funding ====
Legal Aid for Survivors of Sexual Assault is funded by the Sexually-Oriented Business Fee, a fee enacted in 2008 also known as the "Pole Tax." Texas strip clubs fought this new tax but lost their battle in the courts in 2014. Funds from this tax are distributed to programs for sexual assault victims and public education.

=== South Central Pensions Rights Project ===
This project provides legal representation to people who reside in Arkansas, Louisiana, Missouri, New Mexico, Oklahoma, or Texas that are trying to gain access to their pension funds but face legal hurdles blocking their access.

=== Transfer on Death Deed ===
The Transfer on Death Deed (TODD) project provides free document preparation to transfer real estate effective upon the death of the owner. In general, in order to qualify for the service, a person must be a Texas resident who has an income of under 125% of the federal poverty guidelines. A person can make up to 200% of the federal poverty guidelines and still qualify only if that person is over 60 years old. The number to call for the Transfer on Death Deed project is 1-800-622-2520.

The law creating this type of document was enacted on September 1, 2015 and amended in 2017.

=== Crime Victims Litigation ===
Crime Victims Litigation is a project that assists victims of violent crime and identity theft with legal matters related to their victimization. AVOICE attorneys provide legal advice, advocacy and direct representation for victims of crime.

==== Funding ====
This project was funded by a grant created during the 84th Session of the Texas Legislature for the 2015–2017 biennium.

=== Austin Medical-Legal Partnership ===
The Austin Medical-Legal Partnership is an affiliate of the National Center for Medical-Legal Partnership.

=== Texas Veterans Legal Assistance Project ===
The Veterans Legal Assistance Project provides legal advice and services to Texas veterans primarily by phone. The program also provides direct representation for Texas veterans in cases involving bankruptcy and foreclosure. In general, the Project focuses on assisting veterans with issues such as military discharge upgrades, service-connected disability appeals, contracts, divorces, custody agreements, employment law, consumer law, and criminal expungements.

==== Funding ====
The project was formed in 2011 after TLSC received a grant from the Texas Veterans Commission Fund for Veterans Assistance. Today, it is funded by a grant from the Texas Access to Justice Commission. That grant allows the Texas Legal Services Center to help Texas veterans with incomes up to 200% of federal poverty guidelines.

=== CPS Family Helpline ===
The CPS Family Helpline is a new project of the Texas Legal Services Center that provides information, in a confidential manner, to anyone with questions about the Texas CPS system. It primarily helps parents with CPS cases who have questions about how the system works, what they do to resolve matters, and how long CPS may stay involved with their parenting.

== History ==
At that time TLSC's efforts were primarily directed at policy advocacy for providing legal aid to Texans. However, TLSC attorneys also provided limited assistance to the other legal aid offices in significant federal cases whose aim was to help impoverished Texans.
