= Staten Island Legal Services =

- Founded: 2004
- Type: Non-profit
- Location: Staten Island, New York City, New York
- Services: Legal services
- Fields: Free legal services to low-income residents of Staten Island
- Key people: Nancy Goldhill, Project Director
- Website: www.statenislandlegalservices.org

Staten Island Legal Services (SILS) is an American non-profit agency providing free civil legal assistance to low-income people on Staten Island in New York City. SILS has served more than 10,000 clients after its creation in 2004.

== Services ==
The agency provides legal services in the areas including of family law, domestic violence, immigration, foreclosure prevention, and disaster recovery services (post–Hurricane Sandy). SILS also provides advice or referral information if unable to provide representation. Special projects have included defending the rights of the disabled to reasonable accommodations from the New York City Housing Authority.

== See also ==
- Legal Services Corporation
- Legal Services NYC
- Pro bono
