= William F. Harvey =

American law professor

William F. Harvey was an American law professor who was the Carl M. Gray Professor Emeritus of Advocacy at Indiana University Robert H. McKinney School of Law in Indianapolis, IN.

Harvey earned a bachelor's degree in 1954 from the University of Missouri and a juris doctor degree in 1959 from Georgetown University Law Center. He earned an LLM from Georgetown in 1961.

Harvey was the Chair of the National Board of the Legal Services Corporation under U.S. President Ronald Reagan. Harvey succeeded Hillary Rodham (a Carter appointee) in 1982 after the expiration of her term, after being elected by fellow nominees on March 6, 1982.

In 1985, President Ronald Reagan nominated Harvey to a seat on the United States Court of Appeals for the Seventh Circuit. His nomination was blocked by Democrats, however, and he never was confirmed. Harvey withdrew his nomination in October 1985, and the White House never renominated him.

Political offices
Preceded by Hillary Rodham	Legal Services Corporation Chair; 1982–1985	Succeeded by Robert Emmett McCarthy

== See also ==
- Ronald Reagan judicial appointment controversies
