= Arkansas Legal Services Partnership =

Consortium of two nonprofit programs

The Arkansas Legal Services Partnership was a consortium of two nonprofit legal services programs, the Center for Arkansas Legal Services and Legal Aid of Arkansas, that worked together to provide free civil legal assistance to low-income residents throughout Arkansas. While the two nonprofits still collaborate, the Arkansas Legal Services Partnership no longer exists.

According to its website at one time, its vision was to "improve the lives of low-income Arkansas by championing equal access to justice for all regardless of economic or social circumstances."

== Background ==
The Center for Arkansas Legal Services (CALS) and Legal Aid of Arkansas (Legal Aid) are 501(c)(3) nonprofit organizations that provide free legal services to low-income individuals residing in the state of Arkansas in civil (non-criminal) cases, ranging from family to consumer and housing to individual rights cases. Together the two programs serve clients in all seventy-five counties in Arkansas. CALS, headquartered in Little Rock, serves 44 counties while Legal Aid, based in Jonesboro, serves 31 counties.

== Services ==
The Arkansas Legal Services Partnership handled the following areas of law:

- Family Law (e.g., child custody, visitation, protection from domestic violence, guardianship, etc.)
- Consumer Law (e.g., contracts protection from predatory lenders, garnishments, bankruptcy, etc.)
- Housing Law (e.g., Landlord/Tenant disputes, eviction defense, homeownership, etc.)
- Economic Justice Law (e.g., employment discrimination, protection of due process rights, mainstream benefits, educational rights, etc.)
- Elder Law

According to one of its annual reports, Arkansas Legal Services Partnership handled more domestic violence cases than any other type of case. Data suggest that victims of domestic violence will rarely leave the abusive situation if they cannot find a way to protect their children and permanently cut ties with their abuser.

The vast majority of clients contact the program through a statewide toll-free HelpLine jointly operated by the two programs. Once financial eligibility is determined and a case opened, services may include:

- Legal advice used to empower the clients to resolve the problem themselves (71% of completed cases)
- Limited service from an attorney or paralegal to help clients resolve their problems (e.g. sends a letter or makes a phone call)
- Full representation by an attorney (staff attorney or pro bono attorney from the private sector)

In addition, the Arkansas Legal Services Partnership operated an online legal library and community education programs.

== Fair Housing ==
Legal Aid of Arkansas houses the Fair Housing project for the entire State of Arkansas. Fair Housing provides equal housing opportunities for everyone, and ensures that no one may be denied their right to housing based on race, skin color, religion, sex, national origin, disabilities, or children in the home. All Americans are protected under the Fair Housing Act of 1968 and entities such as the Fair Housing Project work with Housing and Urban development (HUD) to enforce these laws.

== HelpLine ==
Both the Center for Arkansas Legal Services and Legal Aid of Arkansas operate a statewide HelpLine where clients are determined eligibility and what level of service is needed. Clients are assisted differently depending on their unique situation: some receive legal advice over the telephone; some receive detailed information sent by mail; others are provided brief services such as filing a form; and still others are referred to a staff or volunteer attorney for legal representation. In 2006 the Statewide HelpLine received 24,938 calls and opened 11,268 cases, but could not assist 10,115 callers because of resource shortages. The statewide toll-free HelpLine number is 1-800-9-LAW-AID (1-800-952-9243).

== Eligibility ==
Legal assistance is provided to eligible clients without charge. Clients may be required to pay court costs and other fees incidental to litigation. Clients must meet income and asset guidelines as well as case priorities. With some exceptions, clients must have incomes below 125% of the Federal Poverty guidelines which varies based on household size for most programs. However, exceptions to income limits are made for Veterans who are housing insecure and people working to escape domestic violence.

== Arkansas Pro Bono Partnership ==
The Arkansas Pro Bono Partnership was a collaborative effort to improve and expand the reach of pro bono activities in the state. Sanctioned by the Arkansas Bar Association, the Partnership was charged with coordinating the recruitment, responsibilities, and recognition of volunteer attorneys. The Arkansas Pro Bono Partnership was staffed by the Arkansas Legal Services Partnership. The following comprised the Arkansas Pro Bono Partnership:

- Equal Access to Justice Panel
- River Valley Volunteer Attorney Project
- VOCALS
- Arkansas Volunteer Lawyers for the Elderly (AVLE)

These programs still exist under the collaborative effort of Legal Aid of Arkansas and the Center for Arkansas Legal Services.
