= Texas RioGrande Legal Aid =

U.S. nonprofit organization

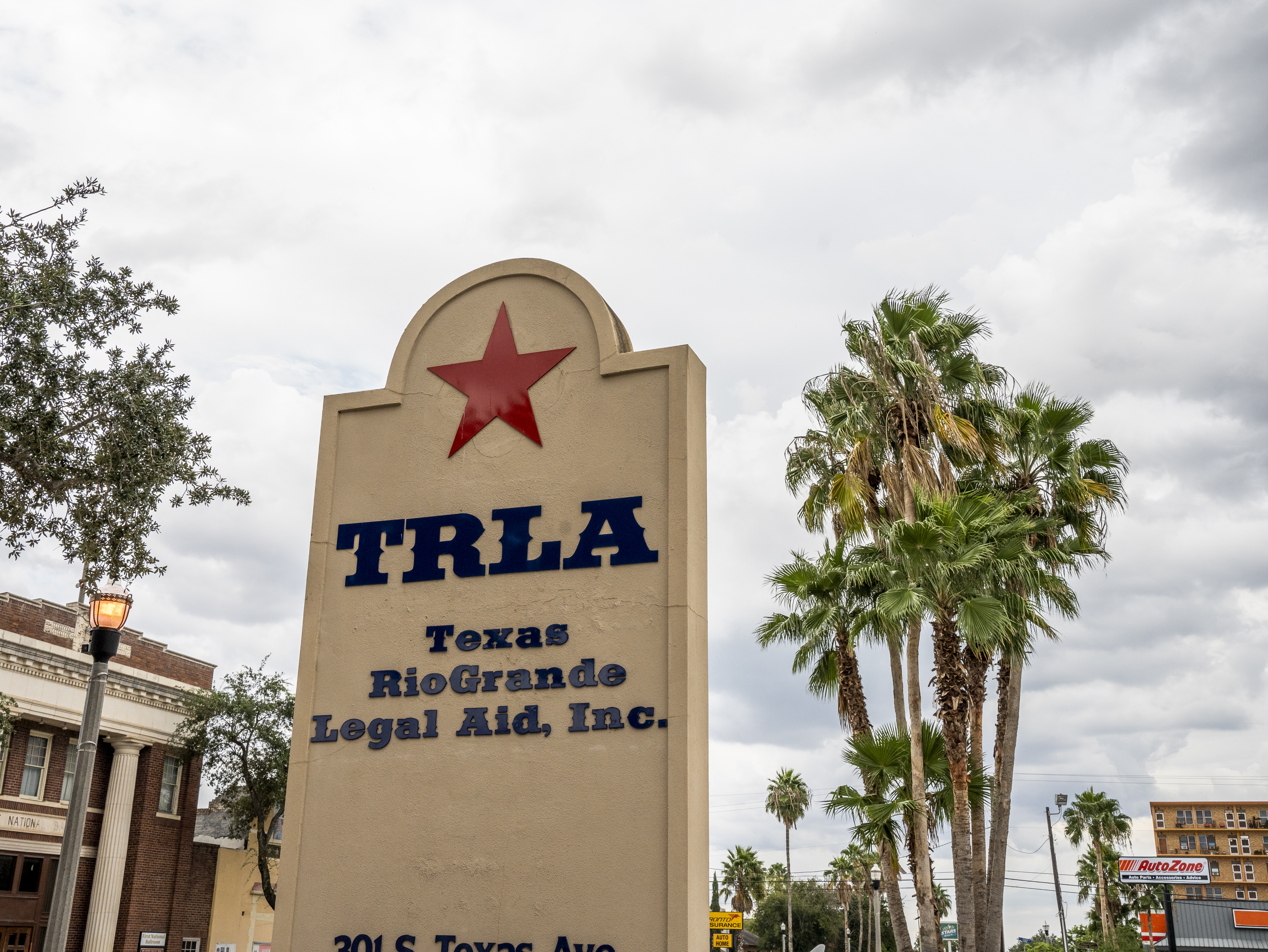
- Abbreviation: TRLA
- Formation: 1970
- Tax ID no.: 74-1675230
- Legal status: 501(c)(3) nonprofit organization
- Headquarters: Mercedes, Texas, United States
- Executive Director: Robert W. Doggett (2018 - present)
- President: Ralph Carrasco, Jr. (2026 - 2028)
- Vice-President: Hon. Ron Rangel (2026 - 2028)
- Treasurer: Lisa Taylor
- Website: www.trla.org

Texas RioGrande Legal Aid, formerly Texas Rural Legal Aid (TRLA), is a Non-profit organization that specializes in providing free civil legal services to the poor in a 68-county service area. It also operates a migrant farmworker legal assistance program in six southern states (Kentucky, Tennessee, Alabama, Mississippi, Arkansas, and Louisiana). Established in 1970, TRLA is the largest legal aid provider in Texas and one of the largest in the United States.

TRLA's mission is to provide exceptional legal advice and representation to impoverished people. Every year the organization provides thousands of clients with legal services. To be eligible, a client must be at or below 200% of federal poverty guidelines depending on the circumstances of the client.

TRLA is not a government agency, nor does it charge its clients for the services it provides. TRLA is funded by grants and individual donations. One of the organization's largest funders is the Legal Services Corporation.

While there are a host of legal aid organizations in Texas that focus on specific issues, there are only three major legal aid organizations operating in Texas that receive LSC funding: TRLA, Legal Aid of NorthWest Texas, and Lone Star Legal Aid, and each has a defined service area of the state.

Like other nonprofit legal aid organizations throughout the United States, TRLA does not have sufficient funding to assist the vast majority of those who qualify and yet desperately need legal help. TRLA, like all the others, have to turn down eligible clients who need legal services every single day. The "justice gap" as it's called, is more of a canyon. Every study of the issue has found that over 92% of the legal needs of the most vulnerable residents of the United States who qualify for free legal assistance do not get help. The 8 percent who do receive help often only receive legal advice and not representation. While some clients merely need advice, most need more.

== History of TRLA ==
Established in 1970, TRLA was created for the purpose of providing civil legal services to poor people in ten south Texas counties. Judge James DeAnda, working through the Texas Trial Lawyers Association, sponsored the creation of TRLA for the purpose of receiving funds from the federal Office of Economic Opportunity (OEO) established by President Lyndon Johnson's War on Poverty Program. David G. Hall was an original board member of the new organization but quickly became its Executive Director.

In 1976, the OEO program was replaced by the Legal Services Corporation (LSC), an independent corporation created by Congress and signed into law by President Richard Nixon. LSC is funded by Congressional appropriation and it awards grants to over 100 legal service programs across the country, including TRLA serving Southwest Texas.

In 1984 the Supreme Court of Texas created the Texas Equal Access to Justice Foundation (TEAJF) to administer funds to support civil legal services for low-income Texans. The first source of those funds was the Interest on Lawyer Trust Accounts (IOLTA) program which takes the interest generated on short-term or nominal deposits made on behalf of clients or third parties into bank accounts of lawyers and distributes them to nonprofit providers of free legal services.

On June 28, 2002, Coastal Bend Legal Services, Bexar County Legal Aid Association, El Paso Legal Assistance Society, and Legal Aid of Central Texas merged into Texas Rural Legal Aid, Inc. to form a new organization to provide legal services to low-income people in a 68-county area of Southwest Texas.

In January 2004, to signify the new program configuration, the name of the organization was changed to Texas RioGrande Legal Aid, Inc. The service area now includes metropolitan areas of Austin, San Antonio, Corpus Christi, Laredo, El Paso, and the lower Rio Grande Valley. And it has a statewide migrant farmworker program including Texas and the six southern states serviced by its Southern Migrant Legal Services office in Nashville, Tennessee.

David Hall stepped down as executive director at the end of 2017 and was replaced by Robert Doggett.

== Practice areas ==
TRLA has over 40 teams that practice in areas such as:

- Community Preservation & Empowerment civil rights, consumer protection, disaster assistance, environmental justice, medical-legal partnerships, community development
- Family Law domestic violence, sexual assault, protective orders, safety planning, child custody, divorce
- Housing landlord-tenant disputes, foreclosures, discrimination, federally subsidized housing, colonias, manufactured homes, fair housing, individuals with disabilities
- Economic & Social Justice disability rights, education, human trafficking, juvenile justice, wills, estates, Native American rights, re-entry
- Labor & Employment displaced workers, farmworkers
- Public Benefits health, homelessness, state and federal public benefits, veterans' benefits

== Special Programs ==
To serve low-income and vulnerable communities with specific legal needs, TRLA has developed a number of Special Programs.

- Austin Tenants Council Project: Working to ensure housing stability by rectifying Fair Housing Act violations and empowering tenants to exercise their rights through mediation, advocacy, and education.
- Family Defense Project: Family Defense Project defends parental rights and preserves family integrity by representing parents involved with DFPS at various stages. FDP prioritizes advocacy during the following five stages, where an indigent parent is not entitled to a court-appointed attorney.
- Medical Legal Partnerships: Combines the expertise of attorneys and medical practitioners to improve the health of low-income people.
- Survivor's Rights Program: The Survivor’s Rights Program is a collection of projects that provide comprehensive assistance to people who have experienced domestic violence or sexual assault. The Program includes The Shelter Project, Bi-National Project, and Legal Aid for Survivors of Sexual Assault (LASSA).
- The Texas Foster Youth Justice Project: Provides free legal aid to current and former foster youth.

== Office locations ==
Texas RioGrande Legal Aid has offices located in many cities in its 68 county service area including: Alpine, Austin, Brownsville, Corpus Christi, Del Rio, Eagle Pass, Edinburg, El Paso, Harlingen, Kerrville, Laredo, Mercedes, San Antonio, Sinton, Uvalde, Victoria, and Weslaco. TRLA also hosts its Southern Migrant Legal Services (SMLS) project in Nashville, Tennessee.
