= Legal Services NYC =

- Founded: 1967
- Type: Non-profit
- Location: New York City
- Services: Legal services
- Fields: Legal services to low-income New Yorkers
- Key people: Shervon M. Small, Executive Director
- Website: www.legalservicesnyc.org

Legal Services NYC (LSNYC) is a nonprofit organization that provides free civil legal assistance to low-income people in New York City. The community-based organization serves more than 100,000 clients annually. It is the nation's largest organization exclusively devoted to providing free civil services to the poor, with programs located in low-income neighborhoods throughout New York City.

== History ==
In 1967, a group of federally funded legal services offices united to become Community Action for Legal Services (CALS), which later changed to Legal Services for New York City. After adopting a new logo and brand, the organization changed its name in 2007, on its 40th anniversary, to Legal Services NYC (LSNYC). The first landmark win for LSNYC came in 1970 with Goldberg v. Kelly, where the US Supreme Court laid down the due process standards for the termination of government benefits.

== Structure ==
The organization's structure serves New York City's low-income community on the local level. Some of the local units are run from the central office, while others are independent organizations with their own local board of directors. Each borough has its own program: Manhattan Legal Services, Queens Legal Services, Staten Island Legal Services, Bronx Legal Services, and Brooklyn Legal Services. There is also a citywide Central Office and a Legal Support Unit.

== Services ==
The organization represents clients in courts and administrative proceedings. It also provides advice or referral information if unable to provide representation. Assistance is provided through legal education and community workshops, help lines and written materials. The organization also provides training to poverty law attorneys and advocates through its Legal Support Unit.

== Governance ==
LSNYC is governed by a board of directors; the members are appointed by Bar Associations, community groups, and other entities. The board of directors is led by the executive committee, composed of the Chair, Vice Chair, Treasurer and Secretary, and three additional non-officer members of the board.

== See also ==
- Education Law Association
- Legal Services Corporation
