= Strategic litigation =

Litigation intended to change society

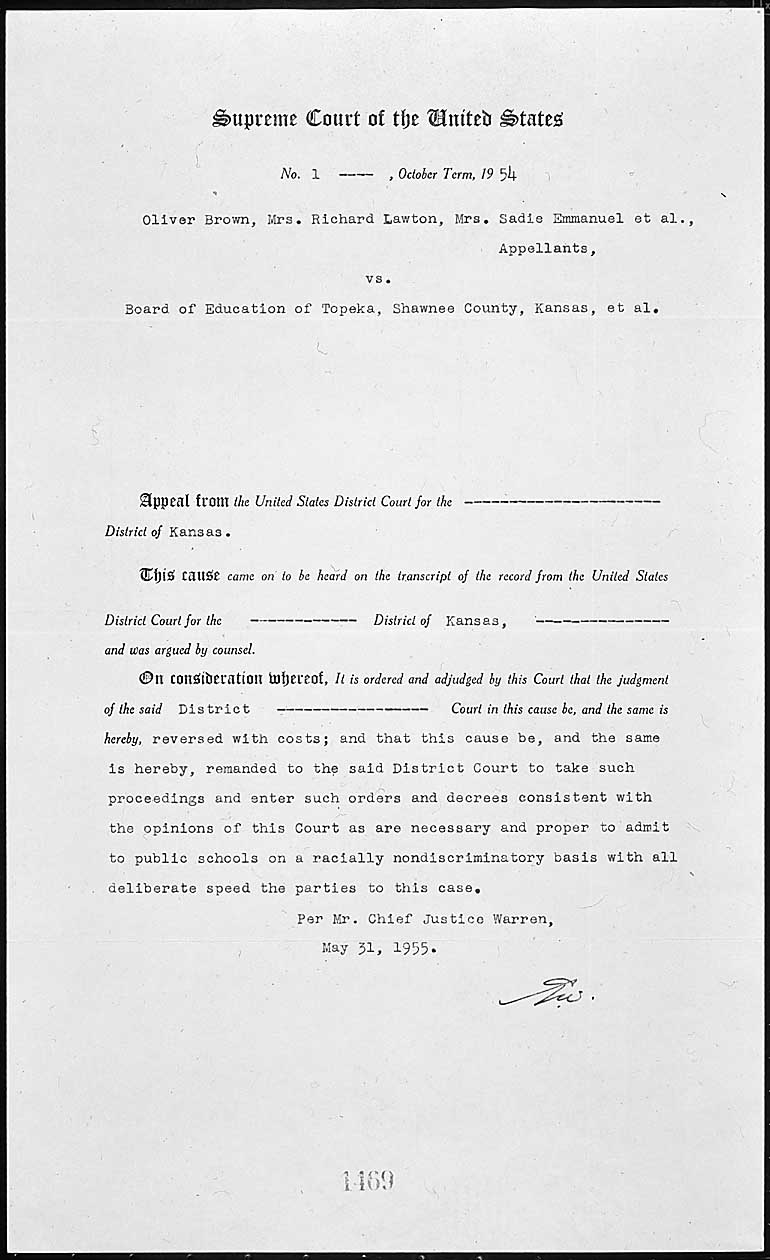
The first page of the U.S. Supreme Court judgement in Brown v. Board of Education, the "mother of all impact litigation".

Strategic litigation, also known as impact litigation, is the practice of bringing lawsuits intended to bring about societal change. Impact litigation cases may be class action lawsuits or individual claims with broader significance, and may rely on statutory law arguments or on constitutional claims. Such litigation has been widely and successfully used to influence public policy, especially by left-leaning groups, and often attracts significant media attention. One prominent instance of this practice is Brown v. Board of Education.

== History ==
In the late nineteenth and early twentieth centuries, the American Civil Liberties Union and National Association for the Advancement of Colored People (at times through its Legal Defense Fund) both pursued legal action to advance and protect civil rights in the United States. The ACLU followed a primarily "defensive" strategy, fighting individual violations of rights when they were identified. The NAACP, in contrast, developed a more coordinated plan to actively file suits to challenge discrimination, known as "affirmative" or "strategic" litigation. The NAACP's model became the pattern for "impact litigation" strategies, which applied similar tactics in contexts other than racial discrimination.

Important early impact litigation cases included Brown v. Board of Education and Roe v. Wade. Brown, a 1954 U.S. school desegregation decision, was carefully prepared by Thurgood Marshall and other NAACP lawyers so that the eventual Supreme Court ruling invalidated official racial discrimination throughout the U.S. government. Many cases since then have closely imitated it, in the course of seeking greater protections for other disadvantaged groups.

== Scope ==
Impact litigation has played a major role in the development of American desegregation, women's rights, abortion, tobacco regulation policy and gay marriage.

Since the 1980s, impact litigation has been used to seek the reform of U.S. child welfare law, following earlier work which involved the courts in jail and mental hospital reforms, and in school desegregation.

Strategic impact litigation, among other things, has also been used in Nigeria to push for convictions of perpetrators of police brutality and to defeat legal attacks on the freedom of the press.

In a few jurisdictions where attorneys are prohibited from bringing class action lawsuits, citizens have filed "grassroots impact litigation" cases and successfully represented their own claims.

== Debate ==
Impact litigation has been criticized by legal scholars and politicians on the basis of judicial legitimacy and competence.

The legitimacy argument holds that, in countries with a constitutional separation of powers, societal changes are to be enacted by democratically elected bodies and are outside the purview of individual judges. The competence argument claims that institutional limitations on the amount and quality of information that can be made available in a court proceeding make the courts poorly prepared to handle complex policy issues. Another version of this argument points out that courts are limited in the scope of their responses, relative to legislative bodies. These debates overlap with those concerning so-called "judicial activism".

=== Lawyer-client relationship ===
Civil rights and poverty litigation has been critiqued for decades due to lawyers assuming too much control in their relationships with clients. The unconscious biases lawyers may hold toward poor, unemployed clients, can cause lawyers to feel the need to make more decisions for their client. While it is lawyers’ responsibility to empower clients to make their own decisions and train their clients to understand and handle their own problems, lawyers in legal aid, law school clinics, advocacy, and small civil rights firms have been found to play a significant role in making decisions. At times lawyers have made decisions without the client’s input. Not maintaining an equal decision-making process reinforces negative stereotypes of low-income individuals and leaves clients feeling politically powerless.

While large organizations practicing impact litigation do not have to worry about the costs of promoting client autonomy, they have been criticized for pushing their own political agendas. The Model Rules of Professional Conduct and Model Code of Professional Responsibility “require loyalty to clients’ goals and prohibit lawyers from allowing other interests, including their own, to interfere with their duties to clients.” Manipulating clients to further personal political agendas is a highly unethical practice in civil rights and poverty law, and has been strongly voiced by critics on the right. This practice comes into play especially in large class action lawsuits when immobilized groups have compounding interests and it is up to lawyers to make final decisions. In order to ensure lawyers are allowing clients to participate equally in the decision making process, lawyers must work to better inform their clients. Having informed clients that can advocate for themselves will allow lawyers to effectively represent the current wishes of individual clients and class members rather than their own perceptions of clients’ long-term goals.

=== Can impact litigation alone effect societal change? ===
In order to bring about significant social reform, lawyers have paired impact litigation with other multidimensional strategies. These strategies include lobbying for regulations and legislation, speaking to the press, building coalitions, organizing grass-roots campaigns, educating clients, influencing government officials, and working with other interest groups. Lobbying state and local governments for policy reform that helps organizations' client base is often a top priority for public interest law organizations. Policy changes can have positive effects on the larger community organizations are serving and assist clients in coming out of poverty. Education also plays a significant role in informing both influential people and affected communities about the injustices faced by marginalized groups. Mobilizing communities at a local, regional, and national level brings power to marginalized communities and helps them be seen and listened to. The American Civil Liberties Union and NAACP are pioneer organizations that recognized the political dimension of lawyering early on, which has led other law firms focused on impact litigation to follow in their footsteps and incorporate educational outreach, mobilization, and policy influence into their strategy.

== Examples ==
- LGBT rights litigation
- Environmental litigation

== See also ==
- Amicus curiae
- Public interest law
