= Rust v. Sullivan =

- Supreme Court of the United States

Argued October 30, 1990 Decided May 23, 1991
- Full case name: Irving Rust, et al., Petitioners v. Louis W. Sullivan, Secretary of Health and Human Services; New York, et al., Petitioners v. Louis W. Sullivan, Secretary of Health and Human Services
- Citations: 500 U.S. 173 (more) 111 S. Ct. 1759; 114 L. Ed. 2d 233; 1991 U.S. LEXIS 2908; 59 U.S.L.W. 4451; 91 Cal. Daily Op. Service 3713; 91 Daily Journal DAR 6006

Case history
- Prior: Summary judgment for defendant, 690 F. Supp. 1261 (S.D.N.Y. 1988); affirmed, 889 F.2d 401 (2d Cir. 1989).

Holding
- Health and Human Services regulations prohibiting recipients of government funds from advocating, counseling, or referring patients for abortion were a permissible construction of Title X of the Act, nor did they violate the First or Fifth Amendments.

Court membership
- Chief Justice William Rehnquist Associate Justices Byron White · Thurgood Marshall; Harry Blackmun · John P. Stevens; Sandra Day O'Connor · Antonin Scalia; Anthony Kennedy · David Souter

Case opinions
- Majority: Rehnquist, joined by White, Scalia, Kennedy, Souter
- Dissent: Blackmun, joined by Marshall; Stevens (parts II, III); O'Connor (part I)
- Dissent: Stevens
- Dissent: O'Connor

Laws applied
- U.S. Const. amends. I, V; Public Health Service Act, 42 U.S.C. §§ 300–300a-8

Rust v. Sullivan, 500 U.S. 173 (1991), was a case in the United States Supreme Court that upheld Department of Health and Human Services regulations prohibiting employees in federally funded family-planning facilities from counseling a patient on abortion. The department had removed all family planning programs involving abortions. Physicians and clinics challenged this decision in the Supreme Court, arguing that the First Amendment was violated due to the implementation of this new policy. The Supreme Court, in a 5–4 opinion, allowed the regulation to go into effect, holding that the regulation was a reasonable interpretation of the Public Health Service Act, and that the First Amendment is not violated when the government merely chooses to "fund one activity to the exclusion of another".

== Background ==
=== Legislative and regulatory history ===
When Congress passed Title X of the Public Health Service Act (hereinafter "the Act") in 1970 §1008 states that Title X funds could not be used "in programs where abortion is a method of family planning." The funding restriction was implemented "in accordance with such regulations as the Secretary may promulgate." The funds were authorized "only to support preventive family planning services".

For around 20 years Title X clinics were permitted to provide referrals and abortion counseling to pregnant patients. Between 1974 and 1978 Congress rejected three amendments that would have prohibited publicly-funded clinics from providing abortion counseling services. A GAO report in 1982 found "no evidence that title X funds had been used for abortions or to advise clients to have abortions". The audit also found that some clinics did not inform patients of alternatives to abortion and provided informational materials describing abortion as a back-up method of family planning. Some of the women who underwent abortion procedures after receiving counseling at title X clinics reported that they later regretted terminating their pregnancies.

Based on the GAO's recommendation that the HHS clarify §1008 regulations the Secretary of Health and Human Services proposed amendments in 1987 "to set specific standards for compliance with the statutory requirement". Clinics were required to refer pregnant patients to prenatal care providers that did not offer abortion planning or procedures. Physicians were directed to tell pregnant patients requesting information about abortion that the clinic did not consider abortion "an acceptable method of family planning". They were not allowed to offer any abortion counseling and could not make referrals to licensed abortion providers. The new regulations also required that Title X clinics be physically and financially separate from facilities that provide abortion counseling.

Around 4,000 Title X clinics serving 4.3 million mostly low-income patients were effected. Supporters of the regulations argued that abortion counseling at Title X projects directly channeled federal funds to Planned Parenthood and other abortion clinics contrary to the intention of providing public funds for preventive family planning services. Planned Parenthood said there was no evidence supporting the accusation that federal funds were being used to improperly promote abortion.

=== Procedural history ===
These regulations were challenged by the recipients of Title X funds on the grounds that they exceeded the Congressional intent of the statute and violated the free speech rights of doctors counseling patients.

The family planning clinics requested declaratory judgements in federal courts. before the rules went into effect.

The petitioner Irving Rust was the director of a family planning clinic. Reagan's term had ended while the first federal appeals were still being decided. President George H. W. Bush decided to keep the new regulations. His administration's Health and Human Services Secretary Louis Wade Sullivan became was the respondent in the case.

Circuit courts were divided. Two courts of appeal ruled the regulations were unconstitutional. The Court of Appeals for the Second Circuit upheld the regulations. The Second Circuit decision was appealed to the Supreme Court.

== Supreme Court ==
Chief Justice Rehnquist wrote a broadly worded opinion for the 5-4 majority upholding the regulations against statutory and constitutional challenges. Justice David Souter, new to the Court, voted with the majority to uphold the new regulations in a 5–4 decision. Justice Sandra Day O'Connor dissented.

=== Briefs ===
Petitioners argued that the government could not impose unconstitutional conditions on the receipt of public benefits: "The government cannot exact adherence to any orthodoxy through the imposition of viewpoint-based conditions on its largess".

The government's position was that "the government is not obligated to provide the means to exercise" the abortion right.

=== Majority ===
==== First Amendment ====
The Court said that the arguments put forth by the Title X clinics "ultimately boil down to the position that if the government chooses to subsidize one protected rights, it must subsidize analogous counterpart rights". Relying on prior precedents the Chief Justice added that "the Court has soundly rejected that proposition". This argument had been rejected by the Court in Regan v. Taxation with Representation of Washington, 461 U.S. 540 (1983). Section 1008's abortion prohibition was constitutional because the government may, in the language of Maher v. Roe, "make a value judgment favoring childbirth over abortion", and subsidize some family planning services without an obligation to subsidize those that "promote or encourage abortion".

The court also rejected the argument that the regulations had conditioned the receipt of a benefit on the non-exercise of free speech rights that protect abortion advocacy and counseling. Recipients of Title X funds are not required to give up abortion-related speech outside Title X projects:

The Title X grantee can continue to perform abortions, provide abortion-related services and engage in abortion advocacy; it simply is required to conduct those activities through programs that are separate and independent from the project that receives Title X funds.

The Court points out that unconstitutional conditions are conditions placed on recipients where a benefit recipient is "barred absolutely" from the restricted activity because it is "not able to segregate its activities according to the source of its funding".

==== Fifth Amendment ====
Privately funded abortions received a measure of court protection from coercive regulations after Roe. In the Harris v. McRae (1980) and Maher cases, however, the Court upheld restrictions on public funding, services and facilities for abortions. The court pointed out that it would "strain logic, in light of the more extreme restrictions in those cases, to find that the mere decision to exclude abortion-related services" from a preventive family planning program would impermissibly deprive women of their Fifth Amendment right to terminate their pregnancy.

The Court also rejects petitioner's argument that the regulations impermissibly deprive women of their Fifth Amendment right to medical self-determination under City of Akron v. Akron Center for Reproductive Health (1983) and Thornburgh v. American College of Obstetricians and Gynecologists (1986) by placing restrictions on the counsel a doctor can give a patient within the context of the doctor-patient relationship:

"Under the Secretary's regulations...a doctor's ability to provide, and a woman's right to receive, information concerning abortion and abortion-related services outside the context of the Title X project remains unfettered...the Constitution does not require that the Government distort the scope of its mandated program in order to provide that information."

==== Chevron deference ====
All district courts and Courts of Appeals had found that the legislative history was ambiguous with respect to funding for counseling under §1008. Applying Chevron the Court explained that an administrative agency's plausible construction of an authorizing statute receives deference when the legislative history was ambiguous as to congressional intent about restricting funds for abortion counseling. Although the previous regulations had been in place for 20 years, the Court said that revised interpretations are accorded judicial deference under Chevron. The Court found adequate justification was provided for the change based on the GAO report and recommendations.

=== Dissent ===
In a dissenting opinion, Justice Blackmun said "the Court for the first time upholds viewpoint-based suppression of speech, solely because it is imposed on those dependent upon the government for economic support. I conclude that the Secretary's regulation of referral, advocacy and counseling activities exceeds his statutory authority, and also that the regulations violate the First and Fifth Amendments of our Constitution." Justices Marshall, Stevens, and O'Connor joined Blackmun's dissenting opinion. Stevens wrote separately that "not a word in the statute...authorizes the (HHS) Secretary to impose any restrictions on the dissemination of truthful information or professional advice by grant recipients."

Justice O'Connor dissented from the majority in Rust on statutory grounds.

== Impact ==
Congress quickly passed an amendment to Title X that said publicly-funded clinics should be permitted to make referrals to licensed abortion providers when requested by a pregnant patient. President Bush did not delay in vetoing this legislation. The House narrowly failed to override the veto, so the regulations remained in effect.

The Supreme Court had signaled their disapproval of any application of the regulations that would prevent a doctor from providing a patient with a referral for a medically needed abortion. Taking this into account, President Bush amended the regulations to allow a health exception to the family planning policy so that physicians could refer patients for abortions when it would prevent serious medical harm to the patient. However, the Bush administration did not follow the proper administrative procedures required for issuing new regulations. As a result, Bush's changes were declared void by the Court of Appeals for the D.C. Circuit.

It was an election year and the Bush White House did not have time to put any new policy in place; Bill Clinton was elected in the 1992 Presidential Election. Eliminating the Title X "gag rule" had been a campaign promise and the regulations were promptly reversed as one of the first official acts of the new administration in January 1993. Around 75,000 people protested in Washington D.C. on the day the regulations were reversed. People from all over the United States carried signs and wore stickers with non-partisan statements like "In Your Heart You Know It's Wrong" and "The Natural Choice is Life".

== See also ==
- List of United States Supreme Court cases, volume 500
- List of United States Supreme Court cases
- Lists of United States Supreme Court cases by volume
- List of United States Supreme Court cases by the Rehnquist Court

== Works cited ==
- Biskupic, Joan Supreme Court Yearbook 1989-1990 Paperback Edition. CQ Press, 1991,
- Goldstein, Leslie Friedman. Contemporary Cases in Women's Rights. University of Wisconsin Press, 1994.
- McCarthy, C. Andrew. 'The Prohibition on Abortion Counseling and Referral in Federally-Funded Family Clinics' (1989) California Law Review, vol 77, no. 5, pp. 1181–1210.
- Sullivan, Kathleen M. 'Foreword: The Justices of Rules and Standards' (1992) Harvard Law Review, vol 106, no. 1, November 1992, pp. 22–129
