= Dan Paul =

American lawyer (1924–2010)

- Born: Daniel Perkins Smith Paul; July 22, 1924; Jacksonville, Florida
- Died: January 24, 2010 (aged 85); Miami, Florida
- Occupation: lawyer
- Known for: chief lawyer in Miami Herald Publishing Co. v. Tornillo (1974)

Daniel Perkins Smith Paul (July 22, 1924 – January 24, 2010) was an American attorney best known for arguing the landmark case Miami Herald Publishing Co. v. Tornillo before the Supreme Court of the United States. The decision established the principle that government could not force a newspaper to publish content.

Paul was born in Jacksonville, Florida, grew up in Daytona Beach, Florida, and was educated at Harvard University, receiving degrees in law and public administration. Setting up practice in Miami, Florida, he specialized in First Amendment and environmental law. His clients included the Miami Dolphins of American football and newspapers such as The Miami Herald and The Wall Street Journal. For his active role in city politics, Paul was nicknamed "the father of Metro". On June 13, 2015 supporters led by Emerge Miami, the Urban Environment League and New Tropics named a four-acre Biscayne Bay waterfront site after Dan Paul. The site, owned by Miami-Dade County, was formerly called Parcel B, and in 1996 the Miami Heat had promised to turn the site into a public park including a mini-soccer field. Supporters, now including several elected officials, demand the county force the Heat to honor its promise. The site will now be called the Dan Paul park. (16)

== Early life ==
Dan Paul was born in Jacksonville, Florida, on July 22, 1924, to Henry Paul, a pharmacist, and Cornelia Smith Paul, a county tax collector. After growing up in Daytona Beach, he attended Harvard University, receiving a law degree in 1948 and a master's degree in public administration in 1949.

== Legal career ==
Paul began to practice in Miami, Florida in 1949 with the firm of Loftin, Anderson, Scott, McCarthy and Preston. In 1954 he formed a partnership with Francis Sams, specializing in corporate law. Over the next decade, he established himself as one of Miami's most prominent attorneys. In 1966, the Miami News called him "Dade's knight" and wrote of him that "the name Dan Paul comes up in so many civic controversies that it is hard to keep up with him". Paul eventually became known as "the father of Metro".

In 1967, a suit filed by Paul against a plan to reapportion and expand the Florida Legislature reached the US Supreme Court. The Court struck down the plan. Paul stated that he had filed the suit because "it would greatly hurt the future of Florida to let the Legislature grow to such monstrous proportions that we would cease to have effective government."

One of Paul's specialties was environmental law, and he represented the National Audubon Society in a late-1960s lawsuit to stop an airport from being constructed in the Florida Everglades, a protected region of subtropical wetlands. He also acted as a parks activist, protesting the removal of sidewalks designed by Brazilian architect Roberto Burle Marx. Paul played a major role in amending Miami's city code to block the construction of buildings within fifty feet of the shore.

Paul worked for a time in partnership with Parker Thomson in one of the most prominent legal practices in Miami, Paul and Thomson. By the end of their practice, 28 percent of Paul and Thomson's time was devoted to pro bono work. However, the partners split acrimoniously in 1983. In the 1970s and '80s, Paul also acted as general counsel for the Miami Dolphins of American football.

In 2001, Harvard established a professorship in his name at the John F. Kennedy School of Government.

=== First Amendment law ===
Paul represented the Miami Herald for more than three decades, as well as working for The New York Times, The Wall Street Journal, and NBC. James Goodale, a First Amendment specialist, described Paul after his death as "an important figure in freedom-of-press matters nationally and particularly in Florida ... In Florida, in particular, he was a leader in resisting subpoenas for reporters' sources."

Paul is best known for acting as the chief lawyer for the Herald in Miami Herald Publishing Co. v. Tornillo, a 1974 US Supreme Court case. In the case, a political candidate, Pat Tornillo Jr., had requested that the Herald print his rebuttal to an editorial criticizing him, citing Florida's "right-to-reply" law, which mandated that newspapers print such responses. The Herald challenged the law, and the case was appealed to the Supreme Court.

The court unanimously overturned the Florida statute under the Press Freedom Clause of the First Amendment, ruling that "Governmental compulsion on a newspaper to publish that which 'reason' tells it should not be published is unconstitutional." The decision showed the limitations of a 1969 decision, Red Lion Broadcasting Co. v. Federal Communications Commission—in which a similar "Fairness Doctrine" had been upheld for radio and television—establishing that broadcast and print media had different Constitutional protections. The decision is considered a landmark in First Amendment law.

== Personal life ==
Paul never married. For hobbies, he enjoyed tennis, speedboating, and waterskiing.

On January 9, 1980, Paul was attacked by an 18-year-old guest, Bradley Schlegel, at his home in Star Island. (Note: Schlegel's name was initially misreported as "Bradley Scott", the name he gave to police officers. His age was also disputed.) Schlegel stabbed Paul in the face, chest, arms, and back, and Paul subsequently underwent plastic surgery to repair the wounds. Schlegel was charged with attempted murder, possession of a weapon, and attempted robbery. He initially contended that Paul had made aggressive sexual advances to him, prompting him to stab Paul in self-defense. Schlegel later pleaded no contest to a charge of aggravated battery.

Paul died at his home in Miami on January 24, 2010, of Parkinson's disease.
