= Zapple =

Zapple may refer to:

- Zapple Records, British record label and subsidiary of Apple Records
- Nicholas Zapple (died 2008), American attorney
  - Zapple doctrine, provision of the FCC fairness doctrine named for Zapple
- Zapple Monitor, computer operating system
- Apple Zapple (Kings Dominion), roller coaster in Doswell, Virginia, US

== See also ==
- Apple (disambiguation)
