= Billy James Hargis =

American televangelist (1925–2004)

- Born: August 3, 1925
- Died: November 27, 2004 (aged 79); Tulsa, Oklahoma, United States
- Education: Ozark Bible College; Pikes Peak Bible Seminary; Burton College and Seminary
- Occupations: Christian evangelist Conservative political activist
- Spouse: Betty Jane Secrest Hargis (married 1951)
- Children: Bryan Joseph Hargis (died in infancy); Becky J. Frank; Bonnie Jane Choisnard; Brenda Jo Epperley; Billy James Hargis II (deceased)
- Parent(s): Jimmie Earsel Hargis and Laura Lucille Hargis

Billy James Hargis (August 3, 1925 – November 27, 2004) was an American Christian evangelist. At the height of his popularity in the 1950s and 1960s, his Christian Crusade ministry was broadcast on over 500 radio stations and 250 television stations. He promoted an anti-Communist, segregationist message as well as evangelizing, and founded a radio station, monthly newspaper, and a college in Tulsa, Oklahoma to support his ministries. In 1974, several students at his American Christian College accused Hargis of sexual misconduct; however, the Tulsa district attorney did not press charges. Hargis went into partial retirement, and the college closed in 1977. He continued to publish his newspaper and write books.

== Biography ==
Hargis was adopted by a railroad employee, Jimmie Earsel Hargis, and his wife, Laura Lucille Hargis. By the time the boy was ten, his adoptive mother was in poor health and close to death. The boy had been baptized, and had few pleasures other than the family's daily Bible readings because his family was too poor during the Great Depression to own a radio. When his mother was hospitalized, Hargis promised to devote himself to God if she was spared from death. She recovered and, at age 17, Hargis was ordained in the Disciples of Christ denomination, even before completing Bible college. After a few years, he left his pastorate for a ministry of radio preaching.

In 1943, Hargis entered Ozark Bible College in Bentonville, Arkansas, and studied there for one year. By 1947, when he became concerned about Communism, he was pastor of the First Christian Church in Sapulpa, a city west of Tulsa. He later received his Bachelor of Arts degree from Pikes Peak Bible Seminary in 1957 and a theology degree from Burton College and Seminary in Colorado in 1958.

In 1950, he established an organization called the Christian Crusade. In the mid-1950s, Hargis was closely associated with the evangelist Carl McIntire and in the early 1960s Hargis had developed a close relationship with the resigned United States Army Major General Edwin Walker, but he increasingly went his own way in preaching anti-Communism. His targets included government and popular singers. In 1957, the Disciples of Christ denomination withdrew his ordination because he attacked other churches in his anti-Communist crusade. Still, by then, Hargis' radio program was bringing in $1 million annually, and he had established a degree of financial and theological independence. In 1960, the Federal Bureau of Investigation investigated Hargis, suspecting him of being linked to recent bombing attacks on Little Rock public schools and of planning to bomb Philander Smith College. No evidence was found and no charges were filed. On May 31, 1961, Bob Jones University honored Hargis with an honorary Doctor of Laws.

1966 Hargis founded a congregation in Tulsa, Oklahoma called the Church of the Christian Crusade. This was part of a complex of organizations that he founded in Tulsa, including the American Christian College in 1971 and the Christian Crusade monthly newspaper.

== Marriage and family ==
Hargis married Betty Jane Secrest of Sciotoville, Ohio, in 1951. They had three daughters and a son, Billy James Hargis II, who died on September 9, 2013, and Bryan Joseph Hargis, who died in infancy. He has a grandson, Billy James Hargis III.

== Career ==
Hargis' motto was "All I want to do is preach Jesus and save America." Drawing on premillennialist theology, Hargis believed national and world events were part of a cosmic struggle, where the ultimate actors were Christ and Satan. To him communism represented the latter, the United States represented the former. He used this as justification for why the United States should return to what he believed were its founding Christian ideals.

=== Positions and activities ===
Hargis preached on cultural issues: against sex education and Communism, and for the return of prayer and Bible reading to public schools, long before the rise of the late 20th century Religious Right. His belief in conspiracy theories led to a belief that the government, the media, and pop culture figures were promoting "communism" in the late 1960s. Hargis' subordinate, Rev. David Noebel, wrote the short work, "Communism, Hypnotism and the Beatles" (1965), which he expanded into "Rhythm, Riots and Revolution" the following year. Both pamphlets were published by the Christian Crusade. Hargis claimed to have written a speech for the infamous anti-communist Senator Joseph R. McCarthy.

Hargis was a member of the John Birch Society and strongly favored segregation, arguing that desegregation violated the Eighth Commandment by allowing the government to steal from one's property. He also accused Dr. Martin Luther King Jr. of being Communist-educated, and published Dr. James D. Bales' anti-King book, The Martin Luther King Story. He opposed the crusades of rival evangelist Billy Graham and endorsed George Wallace in the 1968 presidential election in part because of Republican nominee Richard Nixon's relationship with Graham. Along with his friend Carl McIntire, who was staunchly anti-Catholic, Hargis was one of the most influential people in a movement later known as the "Old Christian Right." However, both Hargis and McIntire lost influence by failing to capitalize on the fact that most American Catholics were staunchly anti-communist.

Hargis addressed audiences with his revival style. He was the author of at least 100 books, including The Far Left, and Why I Fight for a Christian America. In addition, his organization published a pamphlet on sex education, entitled "Is the School House the Proper Place to Teach Raw Sex?", by Gordon V. Drake, the Christian Crusade's educational director.

In 1962 he founded the organization "Anti-Communist Liaison", whose purpose Hargis described as concerning "what must be done in the field of education and otherwise to help save our country from internal communism".

In 1964, Hargis supported Republican Senator Barry Goldwater in that year's presidential race. However, Goldwater lost the election in a landslide and the Old Christian Right soon began an irreversible downward spiral. A movement known as the New Christian Right, which sought to capitalize on the mistakes of the Old Christian Right by embracing Roman Catholicism, was formed in the late 1970s following the loss of the Vietnam War. Many had feared the defeat in Vietnam would revive the Counterculture of the 1960s.

=== Red Lion case ===
On November 25, 1964, Hargis attacked a book and an article called "Hate Clubs of the Air" he believed to be written about him in The Nation magazine by journalist Fred J. Cook in a recorded broadcast heard on radio station WGCB in Red Lion, Pennsylvania. When the radio station refused a right of reply, Cook successfully sued the station who then unsuccessfully countersued the FCC for First Amendment violations. This ultimately lead to a landmark 1969 United States Supreme Court decision Red Lion Broadcasting Co. v. FCC upholding the fairness doctrine.

== Founding of institutions ==
In 1950, Hargis founded the Christian Crusade, an interdenominational movement. In 1964, the Internal Revenue Service alleged that Hargis' involvement in political matters violated the terms of the Internal Revenue Code for religious institutions and withdrew the tax-exempt status of the Christian Crusade. Richard Viguerie, a pioneer in using direct mail in the 1970s and 1980s to support conservative movements and their causes, began his career working for Hargis. Viguerie developed direct mail databases to solicit small donations in an average of 2000 mailings a day from a wide field of ideological supporters. At the time, Hargis had reported that the average contribution to his movement was $4, from a constituency of 250,000 donors, and it was receiving $1 million annually.

In association with his Christian Crusade Hargis published the monthly Christian Crusade Newspaper, with a circulation of 55,000, and Weekly Crusade.

He founded the David Livingstone Missionary Foundation, which operated hospitals, orphanages, leprosy villages, medical vans, and mission services in South Korea, Hong Kong, India, the Philippines, and Africa.

Hargis founded American Christian College in Tulsa during 1971 to teach Christian principles and provide an alternative to perceived left-wing and counterculture influences. When asked what was taught there, Hargis said, "anti-communism, anti-socialism, anti-welfare state, anti-Russia, anti-China, a literal interpretation of the Bible, and states' rights."

Concerned with the liberalization of abortion laws following the United States Supreme Court decision in Roe v. Wade, Hargis launched Americans Against Abortion in 1973 with David Noebel as its leader. Noebel went on to author his book Slaughter of the Innocents that was published by the American Christian College within months of the Roe v. Wade decision, and wrote many provocative articles for fundamentalist publications on the abortion issue.

He also started a television show, Billy James Hargis and his All-American Kids. It was sold to independent television stations. Students from the college performed in the musical group.

== Scandal ==
In 1974, when Hargis was nearly fifty, he was forced to resign as president of American Christian College because of allegations that he had seduced college students. Two of his students claimed that they had had sexual relations with Hargis—one was female, one was male. Other students corroborated the story. Three more male students made similar accusations. Hargis denied the sexual allegations until his death, both publicly and in his autobiography, My Great Mistake (1985). The account was reported by Time in 1976, along with other alleged incidents at Hargis' farm outside of Neosho, Missouri, and while on tour with his All American Kids musical group. The Tulsa district attorney investigated but never brought charges against Hargis. The local newspapers, the Tulsa World and the defunct Tulsa Tribune, declined to publish the accusations.

When Hargis stepped down as president of American Christian College, he was succeeded by former vice president David Noebel. In February 1975, Hargis tried to regain control of the college but was rejected by its board. By September, he returned to his other ministries. They were said to welcome him after he repented. As Jess Pedigo, president of the David Livingstone Society, said, "There was a danger of bankruptcy." Hargis did not give the deed to the property to the college for months after leaving, which prevented it from gaining regional accreditation. In addition, he withheld the fundraising lists, which all the organizations had previously shared. With declining enrollment after the scandal became public, the college closed in 1977. In 1985 Hargis told a Tulsa reporter, "I was guilty of sin, but not the sin I was accused of."

About 1976, he eventually retreated to his Missouri farm, where he continued to work, resuming a greatly diminished ministry, issuing daily and weekly radio broadcasts. He continued to publish the monthly newspaper, The Christian Crusade Newspaper, and wrote numerous books.

In his final years, suffering from Alzheimer's disease and a series of heart attacks, Hargis died in a Tulsa nursing home on November 27, 2004, at seventy-nine.

== Legacy ==
His son, Billy James Hargis II, continued his ministry until his own death. Hargis' organization and college also established and operated Tulsa radio station KBJH (FM 98.5) in the early 1970s. After the college's closing and the demise of his ministry, the station was sold to Epperson Broadcasting.

Hargis, alongside Dan Smoot, Carl McIntire, and H.L. Hunt, has been described as among "four of the era's most prominent extremist broadcasters". Hargis and his church owned and operated a small AM radio station in Port Neches, Texas, from 1980 to the early 1990s. KDLF radio (so named after the David Livingston Foundation) played Southern Gospel Music and religious programming until it was sold around 1993. In the latter days of Hargis' ownership, the radio station had a local marketing agreement to others but was required to play Hargis' hour-long program daily. It has been said that along with Carl McIntire and others, Hargis "paved the way" for conservative talk radio in subsequent decades.

Hargis' papers, described as "a goldmine for students of American politics," are held at the special collections department of the University of Arkansas Libraries in Fayetteville.

== In popular culture ==
In the late 1970s, the popular WNBC disk jockey Imus in the Morning would occasionally do a segment where he would present himself as a "holy roller" evangelical Christian preacher named "Reverend Billy Sol Hargis". These brief sermons typically promoted a product which would give some form of spiritual benefit to the buyer of the product. One such product was "Sin Soap" which would purify any part of a person's body which had committed an act of sin. "Reverend Billy Sol Hargis" was an intentional satire of Christian ministers who were more interested in financial gain than the spiritual needs of their followers.

Hargis also appears in the Stephen King novel 11/22/63. The novel looks at the attempt on the life of General Edwin Walker (and associate of Hargis as part of Operation Midnight Ride), in the build up to the assassination of John F. Kennedy.
