= WLCH =

WLCH may refer to:

- WLCH (AM), a radio station (1440 AM) licensed to Manchester Township, Pennsylvania, United States
- WLCH-FM, a radio station (91.3 FM) licensed to Lancaster, Pennsylvania
