= Fred J. Cook =

American investigative journalist (1911–2003)

- Born: Fred James Cook; March 8, 1911; Point Pleasant, New Jersey, US
- Died: April 4, 2003 (aged 92); Interlaken, New Jersey, US
- Education: Rutgers University
- Occupation: Investigative journalist
- Years active: 1932–1989
- Known for: Exposing corruption, Red Lion Broadcasting Co. v. FCC
- Notable work: The Unfinished Story of Alger Hiss; The FBI Nobody Knows
- Children: 2
- Awards: Heywood Broun Award

Fred James Cook (March 8, 1911 – April 4, 2003) was an American investigative journalist, author and historian who was published extensively in the New York World-Telegram, The Nation, and The New York Times. He provided contemporaneous accounts of major events and political figures such as the Hindenburg disaster, Alger Hiss, Barry Goldwater, the Cuban Missile Crisis, and the Watergate scandal. He wrote one of the first exposés of J. Edgar Hoover and the Federal Bureau of Investigation in The FBI Nobody Knows (1964). Cook also delved into American history, writing books about the American Revolutionary War, P.T. Barnum, the Pinkertons, and Theodore Roosevelt.

In 1967, Cook successfully sued the religious broadcaster WGCB for maligning him in a landmark case that led the United States Supreme Court in 1969 to uphold the fairness doctrine.

At the end of his nearly five-decade career, Cook had authored 45 books and won Newspaper Guild honors, such as the Heywood Broun Award and the Page One Award for outstanding investigative journalism.

== Early life ==
Cook was born in Point Pleasant, New Jersey and grew up in a house on Bay Avenue near the border with Bay Head. On his mother's side, he was descended from an old New Jersey family, the Comptons. Living in an isolated New Jersey area with few friends, he immersed himself in his father's library of books and decided at age fifteen he wanted to be a writer:

But how did one get started in this field? With naïve logic I reasoned that the best way would be to become a reporter because reporters had to learn to write, didn't they? It did not occur to me that I was about as temperamentally ill-equipped for the news trade as anyone could be. Introspective and unsure of myself, I lacked all trace of the cocky confidence that one usually associates with the reportorial breed. Only dimly aware of such a crucial shortcoming, I enrolled in the journalism program at Rutgers University in New Brunswick, New Jersey. Fortunately for me, the university had an excellent journalism course; and during my four years there, I at least learned the rudiments of the trade and shed some, if not all, of my inhibitions.

He graduated from Rutgers in June 1932 and embarked on his journalism career.

== Career ==
Cook's first job was with the Asbury Park Evening Press. In addition to his duties as a cub reporter, he soon became known as a good rewrite man who could "transform a flood of chaotic incoming notes into readable, vigorous copy". Among his early assignments, he reported on the burning of the Morro Castle ocean liner off the coast of Long Beach Island in September 1934. While editor of the New Jersey Courier, a small Toms River-based weekly, he covered the Hindenburg disaster in May 1937. Having witnessed the airship flying overhead, he wrote a story about its anticipated safe arrival at nearby Lakehurst Naval Air Station. He then had to quickly rewrite it after reaching the crash site with the airship in flames. A few hundred copies of the earlier edition, with the wrong story, were already on their way to news stands, and so he raced to "collar them" before they were sold.

After two years editing the New Jersey Courier, Cook returned to the Asbury Park Evening Press. He remained there during the late 1930s and early '40s before a falling out with his boss, Wayne D. McMurray, led Cook to seek another position. Leveraging his reputation as a rewrite man, he obtained a job on the rewrite bank of the New York World-Telegram. From 1944 to 1959, he worked on major investigative pieces for the newspaper (renamed the New York World-Telegram and The Sun in 1950). He exposed racketeering in New Jersey and New York, and also uncovered an elaborate racetrack scandal that involved the racing commission, state politicians, and the leader of the AFL construction unions in the New York area.

Cook's most celebrated bit of muckraking for the World-Telegram came about in the mid-1950s. He was contacted by co-worker Gene Gleason for rewrite help on a series Gleason was doing on New York City Parks Commissioner Robert Moses. Gleason was looking into possible corruption in how Moses was implementing the U.S. Housing Act of 1949, specifically "Title I: Slum Clearance & Community Development & Redevelopment". The memos that Cook received from Gleason and his investigatory team would become a vital resource for Robert Caro's Pulitzer Prize-winning biography of Robert Moses, The Power Broker (1974).

In 1957, Cook had what he later termed a "watershed experience" which changed the direction of his career. He was approached at the start of the year by Edward Fitzgerald, editor of Saga, a men's "true adventure" magazine. Fitzgerald asked Cook for an in-depth piece on William Remington, whose Soviet espionage case in the early 1950s was a national news story. Cook accepted the assignment and was surprised by what he found, namely, that in Cook's judgment, Remington was wrongfully convicted. Cook wrote in his autobiography that as a result of his work on the Remington story, he developed "a much more critical and analytical eye" on malfeasance occurring in the highest levels of government and in the judicial system. He added, "It was quite a change for a noncombative, often conservative fellow who had begun life in a quiet seacoast town on the New Jersey shore and had grown up without any idea that he would wind up writing about the most controversial issues of his day." Although he had probed wrongdoing in city and state governments, he had never questioned the workings of the U.S. federal government. Though he "considered himself a conservative", he would now frequently be a gadfly in opposition to powerful forces in the country.

Cook would go on to write numerous articles for The Nation—sometimes in collaboration with his World-Telegram colleague Gene Gleason—that took political positions usually identified with the left. For instance, he became an opponent of the death penalty on the grounds that it was cruel and didn't deter crime. He grew highly critical of the FBI, CIA, and the Alger Hiss perjury conviction. He went after oil companies and defense contractors. His writing made him a target of FBI investigations.

In a 1962 piece for The New York Times, Cook documented inhumane conditions inside Sing Sing state prison. Later in the decade, he wrote about environmental catastrophes in New Jersey, and profiled militant community organizers in Newark. In a 1966 article in The Nation, Cook challenged the findings of the Warren Commission that Lee Harvey Oswald had acted alone in the assassination of President Kennedy. In 1968, Cook signed the "Writers and Editors War Tax Protest" pledge, vowing to refuse tax payments in protest against the Vietnam War. In 1969 he was a part of the newly formed Committee to Investigate Assassinations. He wrote an Op-Ed about the 1979 oil crisis for The Washington Post that provoked a critical response from a senior director at the American Petroleum Institute.

=== Cook and Alger Hiss ===
Shortly after completing the Remington story, Cook started doing investigative pieces on a regular basis for The Nation. These were articles that his New York World-Telegram employer "was too conservative to run". Cook's close relationship with The Nation began in 1957 when the magazine's editor Carey McWilliams requested an article on the Alger Hiss perjury case. Cook was initially reluctant to take the assignment, thinking Hiss was "guilty as hell". But McWilliams persisted: "Look, Fred, we'd still like to get a piece on the Hiss case. I understand how you feel, but will you at least do this for us: Will you look at the record? There's no obligation. If you still don't like what you find, that ends it. But will you at least take a look?" Cook decided that, as a good journalist, he was obliged to examine the facts and see where they led.

The fruit of his inquiry appeared in the September 21, 1957 issue of The Nation in an article entitled "Hiss: New Perspectives on the Strangest Case of Our Time". After describing the many charges and countercharges between Hiss and his accuser Whittaker Chambers, Cook concluded that Hiss was not guilty of being a Soviet spy while working for the US State Department. The following year, Cook expanded the article into a book, The Unfinished Story of Alger Hiss. Cook maintained until the end of his life that Hiss was innocent. In an interview given at age 89, he said about his Alger Hiss book:

[A]s a matter of fact, I don't think the book was ever challenged. If I had made some grievous error, they would have been down on my head right away, but it didn't happen. That said to me that I was pretty damned accurate. And everything I saw in the FBI documents in the 1970s just confirmed that I was right.

=== Bribery scandal ===
In 1959, Cook and Gleason were fired by the World-Telegram after they wrote an issue-length exposé, "The Shame of New York", for The Nation. The reporters appeared on David Susskind's TV show, "Open End", during which Gleason claimed that in 1956, a high-ranking New York City official had offered them a bribe—well-paid government jobs for the two reporters' wives—to stop investigating the city's slum clearance program. But when Manhattan District Attorney Frank Hogan hauled Gleason in for questioning, Gleason back-pedaled, saying he had "exaggerated" the story "because I was exuberant and carried away." At that point, the World-Telegram fired him.

Cook wrote in his autobiography that Gleason had been pressured by World-Telegram owner Roy W. Howard to back off the controversial bribery claim. Cook also alleged he had reported the incident at the time to his superiors, but his city editor denied ever hearing about it. This led to a clash between Cook and the city editor, and Cook was fired also. A subsequent Newsday investigation found that the purported bribery offer was not unusual given the tradition of New York politicians putting reporters on government or campaign payrolls, even as those reporters were covering the news.

=== Supreme Court case ===
Cook's 1964 book, Goldwater: Extremist of the Right, initiated a series of events that led to the Supreme Court decision in what is known as the Red Lion case. After the book appeared, Cook was attacked by conservative evangelist Billy James Hargis on his daily Christian Crusade radio broadcast on WGCB in Red Lion, Pennsylvania. Hargis also appeared to be angry about Cook's article in The Nation, entitled "Hate Clubs of the Air", that referenced Hargis. The latter called Cook "a professional mudslinger". Cook sued, arguing that under the FCC's Fairness Doctrine, he was entitled to a right of reply. He won the case, but Red Lion Broadcasting challenged the constitutionality of the doctrine, and their case against the FCC went to the Supreme Court in 1969. The Court ruled unanimously that the Fairness Doctrine was constitutional.

=== History writing ===
In addition to his journalism, Cook found time to pursue a lifelong interest in U.S. history. His first two published books were historical fiction in the "Classic Murder Trials" series. He then authored books on the American Revolutionary War, including What Manner of Men: Forgotten Heroes of the Revolution (1959) and Dawn over Saratoga: The Turning Point of the Revolutionary War (1973). He also contributed articles for American Heritage magazine: one on the Amistad slave ship rebellion, and another entitled "Allan Mclane Unknown Hero of the Revolution".

=== Awards ===
Cook was a recipient of the annual Heywood Broun Award, which honors a journalist who exposes social injustice. The award is sponsored by the NewsGuild-CWA labor union. He also received the Page One Award, presented by the Newspaper Guild of New York for outstanding reporting by journalists working in the New York City area. The award recognized Cook's exposé, "The F.B.I.", which appeared in The Nation in 1958.

== Personal life ==
Cook's first wife Julia died from complications from taking blood-thinners after open-heart surgery in 1974. He wrote a book about it called Julia's Story: The Tragedy of an Unnecessary Death. His second wife, Irene, died in 1992.

On April 4, 2003, Fred J. Cook died at his home in Interlaken, New Jersey. He was 92. He was survived by his son and daughter and six grandchildren.

== Works ==
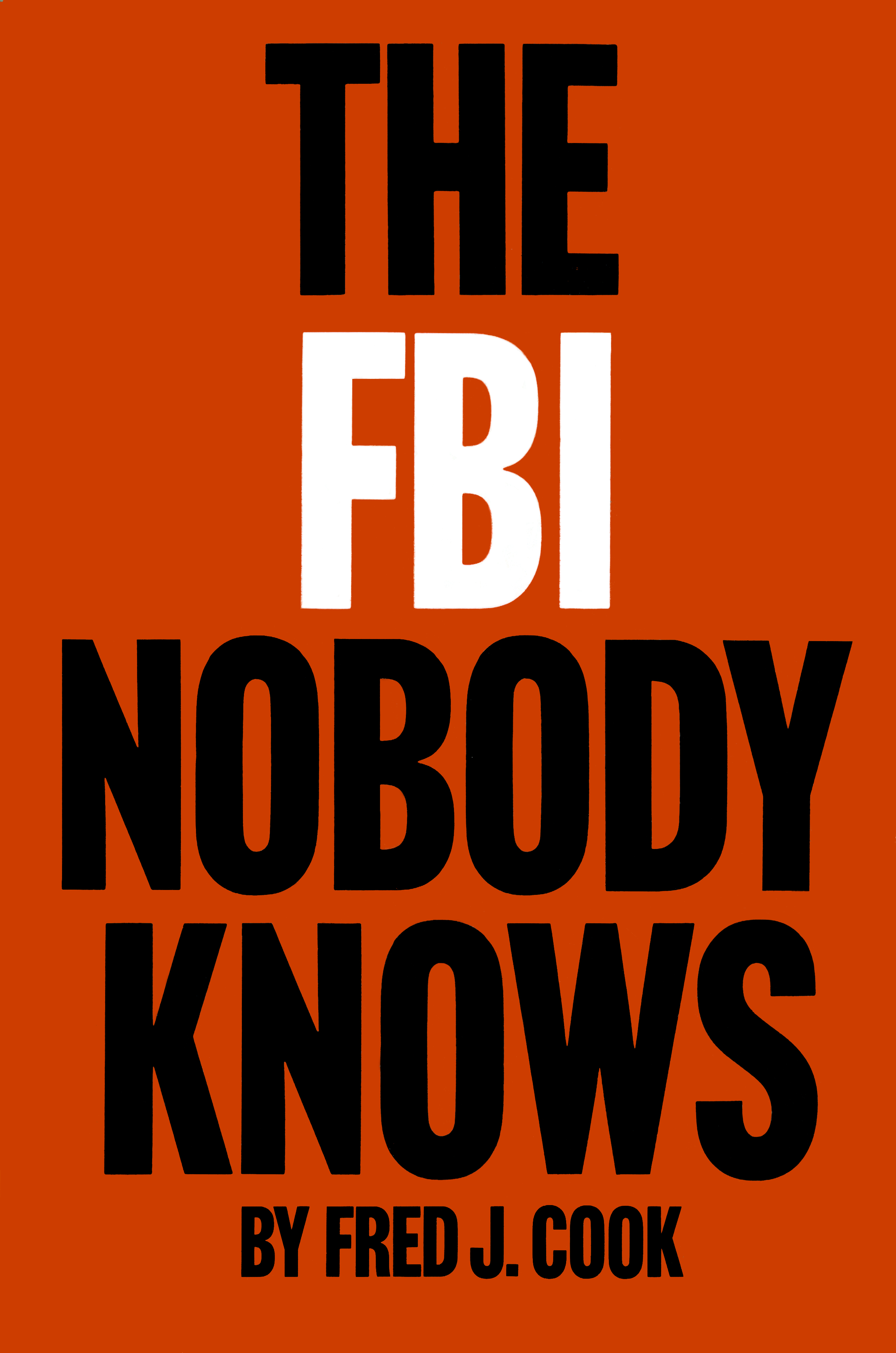
Cook's 1964 exposé, The FBI Nobody Knows, was central to the plot of one of Rex Stout's most popular Nero Wolfe novels, The Doorbell Rang (1965)

The following list focuses on Cook's published books, and doesn't include his hundreds of newspaper and magazine articles:

- The Girl in the Death Cell, Fawcett, 1953.
- The Girl on the Lonely Beach, Fawcett, 1954.
- Youth in Danger: A Forthright Report by the Former Chairman of the Senate Subcommittee on Juvenile Delinquency (written with Robert C. Hendrickson), Harcourt, Brace and Co., 1956.
- Hiss: New Perspectives On The Strangest Case Of Our Time, The Nation, September 21, 1957
- The Unfinished Story of Alger Hiss, Morrow, 1958.
- What Manner of Men: Forgotten Heroes of the Revolution, Morrow, 1959.
- Golden Book of the American Revolution, Golden Press, 1959.
- Rallying a Free People: Theodore Roosevelt, Kingston House, 1961.
- A Two-Dollar Bet Means Murder, Dial Press, 1961.
- John Marshall: Fighting for Justice, Encyclopædia Britannica Press, 1961.
- Entertaining the world P. T. Barnum, Encyclopædia Britannica Press, 1962.
- The Warfare State, Macmillan, 1962.
- Walter Reuther: Building the House of Labor, Encyclopædia Britannica Press, 1963.
- The FBI Nobody Knows, Macmillan, 1964. Excerpt in True, the Men's Magazine.
- Barry Goldwater: Extremist of the Right, Grove, 1964.
- The Corrupted Land: The Social Morality of Modern Americans, Macmillan, 1966.
- The Secret Rulers: Criminal Syndicates and How They Control the U.S. Underworld, Duell, Sloan & Pearce, 1966.
- The Plot against the Patient, Prentice-Hall, 1967.
- What So Proudly We Hailed, Prentice-Hall, 1968.
- Franklin D. Roosevelt: Valiant Leader, Putnam, 1968.
- The New Jersey Colony, Crowell-Collier Press, 1969.
- The Army-McCarthy Hearings, April–June, 1954: A Senator Creates a Sensation Hunting Communists, Franklin Watts, 1971.
- The Rise of American Political Parties, Franklin Watts, 1971.
- The Nightmare Decade: The Life and Times of Senator Joe McCarthy, Random House, 1971.
- Demagogues, Macmillan, 1972.
- The Cuban Missile Crisis, October, 1962: The U.S. and Russia Face a Nuclear Showdown, Franklin Watts, 1972.
- The Muckrakers: Crusading Journalists Who Changed America, Doubleday, 1972.
- American Political Bosses and Machines, Franklin Watts, 1973.
- The U-2 Incident, May, 1960: An American Spy Plane Downed over Russia Intensifies the Cold War, Franklin Watts, 1973.
- Dawn over Saratoga: The Turning Point of the Revolutionary War, Doubleday, 1973.
- Mafia, Fawcett, 1973.
- The Pinkertons, Doubleday, 1974.
- Lobbying in American Politics, Franklin Watts, 1976.
- The Fire and the Fervor, Zebra, 1976.
- Privateers of '76, illustrated by William L. Verrill Jr., Bobbs-Merrill, 1976.
- Julia's Story: The Tragedy of an Unnecessary Death, Holt, 1976.
- Mob, Inc., Franklin Watts, 1977.
- Storm Before Dawn, Condor, 1978.
- City Cop: The True Story of a Young Cop's First Years on the Force, Doubleday, 1979.
- The Ku Klux Klan: America's Recurring Nightmare, Messner, 1980.
- The Crimes of Watergate, Franklin Watts, 1981.
- The Great Energy Scam: Private Billions vs. Public Good, Macmillan, 1982.
- Maverick: Fifty Years of Investigative Reporting (autobiography), introduction by Studs Terkel, G. P. Putnam's Sons, 1984.
