= Pete McTee's Clubhouse =

Saturday morning television series originating from York, Pennsylvania, United States

- Genre: Children's television
- Created by: Lou Castriota, Sr.
- Starring: Lou Castriota, Sr.; Tom Ensminger; Don Schaller; Michael Ovadia; Leslie Morrison; Wembley
- Country of origin: United States
- Original language: English
- No. of seasons: 14
- No. of episodes: 404

Production
- Running time: 22 - 23 minutes
- Production company: WPMT-TV

Original release
- Release: September 15, 1990 – September 5, 2004

Pete McTee's Clubhouse was a Saturday morning television series that originally aired from September 15, 1990 to 2003, with reruns continuing to air until September 5, 2004. The show aired on WPMT Fox-43 in York, Pennsylvania. It starred Lou Castriota, Sr., as Pete McTee and featured an ensemble cast including Tom Ensminger as Professor Noodles, Don Schaller (from 1990 to 2001) and Michael Ovadia (from 2001 to 2003) as Captain Cool, and Sammi Jo (Leslie Morrison). Other characters on the show included Pete's dog Wembley, and his computer Scooter. Overall, 404 episodes were produced.

== Format ==
The show was unique in that it was never scripted. Castriota and Ensminger would meet a few days before taping (which usually occurred on Tuesdays) to rough out the shows segments. The show was filmed before a live studio audience, usually consisting of Boy Scouts troops, Girl Scouts troops, or other groups of children from the area. Each episode featured several segments, typically including an educational segment about science and a segment with a cartoon shown on Scooter's screen (such as The Rocky and Bullwinkle Show).

Between 1993 and the late 1990s, small segments were aired before and after cartoons shown in the early hours of the weekday, typically before school. These segments were called "PeteTV". A word-changed cover of Dire Straits' song "Money for Nothing" had been used, but slightly altered for the theme. Instead of "I Want My MTV"; they spoke "I Want My PeteTV". (Note: These segments were NOT recorded in front of an audience. They were either done live or pre-recorded to air in this method.)

In 2009, a re-mixed version of the show started airing on WGCB-TV, Family 49, in Red Lion, Pennsylvania. New content was added into the old shows to create updated segments.

== Cast ==
- Lou Castriota, Sr. as Pete McTee
- Tom Ensminger as Professor Noodles
- Don Schaller as Captain Cool (1990 - 2001)
- Michael Ovadia as Captain Cool (2001 - 2003)
- Leslie Morrison as Sammi Jo

=== Other characters ===
Other characters on the show include Delivery Dee, a mail delivery person, Amos Carknocker, a Pennsylvania Dutch character, Scooter the Computer, and Wembley, a Basset Hound.

== History ==
Pete McTee was a clown character created by WPMT-TV and Lou Castriota, Sr. in 1989. The name Pete McTee came from the station's callsign.

Castriota had worked for WPMT in the years prior and had left the station to work in Hagerstown, Maryland. While living there, John Rieggel, general manager of WPMT, called Castriota and asked him to audition for a clown character they were creating - Pete McTee. He easily got the job and worked part-time for the station making public appearances as the clown. The earliest known appearance was at an early iteration of Hersheypark's Balloonfest then called The Pennsylvania Hometown Hot Air Balloon Classic, October 13 to 15, 1989. He also made appearances in other local events in the Greater Harrisburg region.

In 1990, Castriota rejoined the station as program director. In response to the Children's Television Act, which required TV stations to air at least three hours of educational children's programming every week, Castriota decided to create a children's show in-house. Castriota gave the role of Professor Noodles, who served as Pete's co-host on the show, to Tom Ensminger, whom he had known since high school. Captain Cool was originally played by Don Schaller from 1990 to 2001 and Michael Ovadia performed as Captain Cool from 2001 to 2003), and Sammi Jo was played by Lesli Morrison. Other characters on the show included Pete's dog Wembley, who belonged to Castriota. The first episode of Pete McTee's Clubhouse aired on September 15, 1990.

In 1994, Castriota said that the station was approached by a company who wanted to purchase the show for international release and that it appeared to be happening, though nothing ultimately came of it.

In November 2003, it was announced that Castriota was leaving WPMT for nearby station WHP-TV. Earlier in 2003, WPMT stopped taping new episodes of the Pete McTee Clubhouse when they were unable to recruit sponsors to underwrite the show. By November Castriota left formally ending the show.

The show continued to air reruns after the conclusion of the series. The final rerun aired on September 5, 2004. The following weekend, it was replaced by Petkeeping with Marc Morrone, a syndicated show.

In 2005, Lou Castriota and Tom Ensminger purchased the show from WPMT. Soon after, the cast began reuniting as the Pete McTee’s Big Red Nose Tour to perform annual live shows at Strand Capital in York, Pennsylvania in 2007 and 2008. The shows benefited Leg Up Farm, a non-profit organization founded by Castriota's son, Lou Castriota, Jr.

== Awards ==
The series won the Pennsylvania Association of Broadcasters (PAB) award for best locally produced children's show in 1991, 1992, 1993, 1994, 1996, 1997, 1999, and 2000.

On October 15, 1992, Castriota was honored as one of 1992's outstanding volunteers by the Multiple Sclerosis Society, Central Pennsylvania Chapter. Castriota was awarded for starting a program called Athletes vs MS, working for more than 15 years with the Society on MS projects, dating back to his days in radio. The Society also identified Pete McTee as a "spokesclown" for the organization.

Castriota won the Television Broadcaster of the Year award from the PAB in 2001 for his work on the show.

== See also ==
Some episodes of the show are available to watch on the Fox 43 website as well as on YouTube.
