= WGCB =

WGCB may refer to:

- WLYH (TV), a television station (channel 49 analog/10 digital) licensed to Red Lion, Pennsylvania, United States, which held the call sign WGCB-TV from 1979 to 2019
- World Guide to Covered Bridges, a covered bridge numbering system
