= Editorial-related advertising =

Editorial-related advertising is associated with the concept of contextual advertising but differs in its ability to match advertising to content in a much more specific manner. Where contextual advertising is keyword based, editorial-related advertising is able to also take in the content of the whole article and match on a conceptual level, rather than simply looking for the existence of pre-selected words. For example, there is no chance that an auto mechanic could advertise next to an article about the Detroit Pistons. It has many different ways to go and one would be to not.

This specificity also ensures that:

- Advertisers do not advertise next to defamatory articles (or they can create content that will offer a right of reply)
- Advertisers do not advertise next to inappropriate content such as obituaries or negative news articles
- Advertisers can appear next to articles in the general subject area of interest, for example for keywords that are not actually included in the on page text.

Advertisers can supply a number of specifically targeted pages, each with their own message to attract users to their 'microsite'. This 'microsite' is housed within a publication on a searchable vertical directory. Advertisers who are not completely related to the publication will not be considered for the program. This creates a directory resource of related suppliers within the publication's website that is also optimized for search engine traffic.

== See also ==
- Online advertising
