= WLYH (TV) =

Television station in Red Lion, Pennsylvania

- Red Lion–York–Harrisburg–; Lancaster–Lebanon, Pennsylvania; United States
- City: Red Lion, Pennsylvania
- Channels: Digital: 10 (VHF), shared with WHTM-TV; Virtual: 49
- Branding: Lighthouse TV

Programming
- Affiliations: 49.1: Religious independent

Ownership
- Owner: Sonshine Family Television Corp.
- Sister stations: WBPH-TV

History
- First air date: April 28, 1979
- Former call signs: WGCB-TV (1979–2019)
- Former channel numbers: Analog: 49 (UHF, 1979–2009); Digital: 30 (UHF, until 2017)
- Call sign meaning: Lancaster, York, Harrisburg

Technical information
- Licensing authority: FCC
- Facility ID: 55350
- ERP: 28.1 kW
- HAAT: 311.1 m (1,021 ft)
- Transmitter coordinates: 40°18′58″N 76°57′0″W
- Translator(s): WLHY-LD (31, Lebanon–Harrisburg–York–Lancaster)

Links
- Public license information: Public file; LMS
- Website: lighthousetv.org

WLYH (channel 49) is a religious independent television station licensed to Red Lion, Pennsylvania, United States, serving the Susquehanna Valley region. Owned by Sonshine Family Television, it is a sister station to Bethlehem-based flagship WBPH-TV (channel 60). WLYH's studios are located on Windsor Road in Red Lion. Through a channel sharing agreement with Harrisburg-licensed ABC affiliate WHTM-TV (channel 27), the two stations transmit using WHTM-TV's spectrum from an antenna on a ridge north of I-81 along the Cumberland–Perry county line.

== History ==
The channel 49 allocation in the Susquehanna Valley region was previously occupied by WNOW-TV, which was based in York and was originally affiliated with the DuMont Television Network (and later the NTA Film Network). It could not compete with WGAL-TV (channel 8) and eventually went off the air on June 1, 1958.

WLYH first signed on the air on April 28, 1979, as WGCB-TV. It was the first completely new station to sign on in South Central Pennsylvania in 26 years. It was founded by John Harden Norris, an engineer for Sinclair Oil and Refining Company, who left his position and joined his father to establish Red Lion Broadcasting in 1950, which also owned WGCB radio (1440 AM, now WLCH, and 96.1 FM, now WSOX; both now owned by Cumulus Media). The Norrises signed on WGCB (AM) (standing for "the World for God, Christ and the Bible") in 1950, followed by WGCB-FM in 1958. In 1962, Norris launched short-wave radio station WINB (originally standing for "World In Need of the Bible", now for "World International Broadcasters"), now the oldest commercial shortwave station in the United States (although the original transmitter failed in 1995, and it took until 1997 to resume full-power broadcasts). At the time, Norris was the only individual in the U.S. to operate AM, FM, short-wave radio and television stations in one location, and under one ownership.

On November 27, 1964, the WGCB radio stations carried a 15-minute religious broadcast maligning journalist Fred J. Cook that would spawn a monumental case that ended with Supreme Court's approval of the Fairness Doctrine. The Court ruled that the Federal Communications Commission (FCC) could enforce the Fairness Doctrine, which prohibits broadcasters from using their monopoly on a broadcast frequency to monopolize discussion on controversial issues. Norris died on September 28, 2008, at the age of 82. The FCC granted a change in control for WGCB-TV on November 5, 2008, to the estate of John H. Norris. DirecTV ceased carriage of WGCB on January 1, 2009.

For much of WGCB-TV's history, it operated as a religious independent station, carrying programs from various televangelists. It was the only over-the-air source of non-network programming in the area until WPMT (channel 43) relaunched as an independent in 1983. On August 17, 2009, WGCB-TV began carrying classic television series daily from 3 to 10 p.m. In 2012, WGCB-TV began carrying select programs from the classic television network MeTV, which also began to be carried on digital subchannel 49.2.

On September 19, 2012, NRJ TV (a company unrelated to European broadcaster NRJ Radio) announced its intent to purchase WGCB-TV from Red Lion Television for $9 million; the sale was completed on December 3.

On December 29, 2014, WGCB-TV stopped carrying MeTV programming (as WGAL-DT2 picked up that affiliation) and began carrying select programs from the classic television network Cozi TV, which also began to be carried on digital subchannel 49.2.

NRJ TV agreed to sell WGCB-TV to Red Lion 49 Media, LLC for $2.5 million on August 29, 2017. The sale was approved by the FCC on December 8, 2017.

In January 2019, Bethlehem, Pennsylvania–based Sonshine Family Television entered into a local marketing agreement to operate channel 49; the station's call sign was changed to WLYH, the former callsign for WXBU. The few secular shows that remain on the station are FCC-mandated educational and informational programs for children on Saturday mornings. On January 17, 2019, it was announced that Sonshine would purchase WLYH from Red Lion 49 Media for $2.7 million. The sale was completed on May 9, 2019.

== Technical information ==
=== Subchannels ===
Subchannels of WHTM-TV and WLYH
License	Subchannel	Res.	Short name	Programming
WHTM-TV	27.1	720p	WHTM-HD	ABC
WHTM-TV	27.2	480i	ION	Ion
WHTM-TV	27.3	480i	GRIT	Grit
WHTM-TV	27.4	480i	Laff	Laff
WLYH	49.1	720p	WLYH-HD	Religious independent

As part of a channel sharing agreement with WHTM, the three subchannels (49.2 Cozi TV, 49.3 Charge!, 49.4 Escape) were dropped.

=== Analog-to-digital conversion ===
WLYH (as WGCB-TV) discontinued regular programming on its analog signal, over UHF channel 49, on June 12, 2009, as part of the federally mandated transition from analog to digital television. The station's digital signal remained on its pre-transition UHF channel 30, using virtual channel 49.

WGCB sold its spectrum for $84 million in the 2016–2017 FCC incentive auction and the station was to cease broadcasting on its current digital channel 90 days after it received payment from the FCC. The station has a channel-sharing agreement with ABC affiliate WHTM-TV. Ironically, WHTM is currently owned by the former WLYH-TV's former owner Nexstar Media Group.

=== ATSC 3.0 lighthouse ===
Subchannels of W16EJ-D and WLHY-LD
Subchannel		Short name	Programming
W16EJ-D	WLHY-LD	Short name	Programming
16.2	31.2	WHTM	ABC (WHTM)
16.3	31.3	WITF	PBS (WITF-TV)
16.4	31.4	WLYH	Lighthouse TV

Two of WLYH's repeaters are currently broadcasting in ATSC 3.0; they are currently the only ATSC 3.0 stations in the market.
