= Nicholas Zapple =

U.S. Senate Commerce Committee counsel and namesake of the Zapple doctrine

Nicholas Robert Zapple (died February 8, 2008) was an American attorney who served as counsel to the United States Senate Committee on Commerce from 1949 to 1975 and specialized in communications and broadcasting policy. He is the namesake of the Zapple doctrine, an extension of the Fairness doctrine created by the FCC in response to a 1970 letter he sent while serving as Communications Counsel to the Senate Commerce Committee.

== Early life and education ==
Zapple was born in Jersey City, and graduated from the John Marshall School of Law there in the early 1940s (the school later became part of Seton Hall University). During World War II he served in the United States Coast Guard as both a legal officer and a line officer aboard a patrol frigate.

== Career ==
After the war Zapple settled in Washington, D.C., in 1946 and worked at the Civil Aeronautics Board before joining the Senate Commerce Committee staff as counsel in 1949. He remained counsel till 1975, focusing on legislation involving television and broadcasting, and on measures related to the creation of the Public Broadcasting Service, and the Communications Satellite Corporation (COMSAT). At the time, Zapple also worked on legislation on sports-broadcasting blackouts and equal-time considerations for political candidates.

=== Zapple doctrine ===
In May 1970, as Communications Counsel to the Senate Commerce Committee, Zapple wrote to the FCC urging that the spirit of the fairness doctrine be applied to campaign supporters and spokespersons, not only to candidates themselves, when broadcasters provided access or sold time during campaigns. The Commission responded by articulating what became known as the Zapple doctrine (sometimes called the "Zapple ruling"), requiring broadcasters to afford roughly comparable opportunities to major-party candidates' supporters when access was provided to the opposing side's supporters. In 2014, the FCC's Media Bureau declared the Zapple doctrine to have "no current legal effect," given the earlier demise of the broader Fairness doctrine.

Zapple died of congestive heart failure on February 8, 2008, at a nursing facility in Annandale, Virginia, at the age of 93.

== See also ==
- Zapple doctrine
- Fairness doctrine
