= WGLD =

WGLD may refer to:

- WGLD-FM, a radio station (93.9 FM) licensed to Conway, South Carolina
- WLCH (AM), a radio station (1440 AM) licensed to Manchester Township, Pennsylvania, which held the call sign WGLD from 2005 to 2024
- WJJK, a radio station (104.5 FM) licensed to Noblesville, Indiana, which held the call sign WGLD from 1997 to 2005
- WCOG (AM), a radio station (1320 AM) licensed to Greensboro, North Carolina, which held the call sign WGLD from 1985 to 1994
- WMKS, a radio station (100.3 FM) licensed to High Point, North Carolina, which held the call sign WGLD from 1975 to 1985
