= WHTM-TV =

Television station in Harrisburg, Pennsylvania

- Harrisburg–York–Lancaster–; Lebanon, Pennsylvania; United States
- City: Harrisburg, Pennsylvania
- Channels: Digital: 10 (VHF), shared with WLYH; Virtual: 27
- Branding: ABC 27

Programming
- Affiliations: 27.1: ABC; for others, see § Subchannels

Ownership
- Owner: Nexstar Media Group; (Nexstar Media Inc.)
- Sister stations: Tegna: WPMT

History
- First air date: June 19, 1953
- Former call signs: WTPA (1953–1980)
- Former channel number: Analog: 71 (UHF, 1953−1957), 27 (UHF, 1957–2009)
- Former affiliations: NBC (1953–1954)
- Call sign meaning: Harrisburg Times Mirror (former owner)

Technical information
- Licensing authority: FCC
- Facility ID: 72326
- ERP: 28.1 kW
- HAAT: 311.1 m (1,021 ft)
- Transmitter coordinates: 40°18′58″N 76°57′0″W

Links
- Public license information: Public file; LMS
- Website: www.abc27.com

WHTM-TV (channel 27) is a television station licensed to Harrisburg, Pennsylvania, United States, serving the Susquehanna Valley region as an affiliate of ABC. It is owned by Nexstar Media Group, whose Tegna subsidiary owns Fox affiliate WPMT (channel 43). WHTM-TV's studios are located on North 6th Street in Harrisburg (although with a Hoffman Street address). Through a channel sharing agreement with religious independent station WLYH (channel 49), the two stations transmit using WHTM-TV's spectrum from an antenna on a ridge north of I-81 along the Cumberland–Perry county line.

== History ==
The station first signed on the air on June 19, 1953, as WTPA (standing for "Television Pennsylvania"), operating as an NBC affiliate. WTPA was founded by the Newhouse family, whose media holdings eventually became Advance Publications, and was operated alongside Harrisburg's two major newspapers, The Patriot and The Evening News (since merged as The Patriot-News). The following year, it switched affiliations to ABC. It originally operated on UHF channel 71, but later moved to channel 27 on June 1, 1957, after that channel's original occupant, WCMB-TV, ceased operations. During WTPA's first year on the air, the station broadcast from 9 a.m. to 12:15 a.m. on weekdays and from noon to midnight on weekends. Early local programs included a midday religious program Daily Devotions, music and comedy-focused variety program Mac's Matinee, daytime talk show Harrisburg Hostess, cooking show Look What's Cooking and Susquehanna Trail.

The Times Mirror Company acquired the Newhouse television stations (including WTPA) on March 28, 1980, and changed its call sign to the current WHTM-TV. The station was sold, along with sister station WETM-TV in Elmira, New York, to Smith Broadcasting Company in 1986. WHTM, in turn, was sold to Price Communications in 1994. Allbritton Communications acquired the station in 1996.

An ice storm that hit South Central Pennsylvania on December 15 and 16, 2007, knocked out the power to WHTM's transmitter site, which also affected the reception of the station on some cable and satellite providers. WHTM's signal began operating at full power once again on the morning of December 18.

Feature reporter Chuck Rhodes served as a minor cast member in the 2000 film Lucky Numbers, which was based loosely on the 1980 Pennsylvania Lottery scandal and starred John Travolta as a cash lacking meteorologist, whose biggest competition in Harrisburg was Rhodes; the real-life incident occurred in Pittsburgh and involved fellow ABC affiliate WTAE-TV.

=== Sale to Media General and then Nexstar ===
On July 29, 2013, Allbritton announced that it would sell its seven television stations, including WHTM, to the Sinclair Broadcast Group. As part of the deal, Sinclair was planning to sell the license assets of its existing Harrisburg station, WHP-TV (channel 21) to Deerfield Media, but would still operate that station through joint sales and shared services agreements. However, the FCC ruled that Sinclair's plans to retain WHTM would have, in effect, created a new LMA between WHTM and WLYH-TV, even though the FCC had ruled in 1999 that such agreements made after November 5, 1996, covering more than 15% of the broadcast day would count toward the ownership limits for the brokering station's owner.

After several revisions to the deal—one which included a proposal to divest WHP and the LMA with WLYH, Sinclair chose to instead retain WHP and the LMA with WLYH, and divest WHTM. On June 23, it was announced that WHTM would be sold to Media General for $83.4 million. After nearly a year of delays, the deal was approved by the FCC on July 24, 2014. Sinclair completed the purchase of the Allbritton stations on August 1, with WHTM being operated under a "Hold Separate Agreement" until its sale to Media General was completed on September 2. Several months later, in a separate transaction, on August 20, 2014, Sinclair also traded three other stations KXRM-TV and KXTU-LD in Colorado Springs, and WTTA in Tampa Bay to Media General for WJAR in Providence, WLUK and WCWF in Green Bay and WTGS in Savannah, which was part of Media General's acquisition of LIN Media, which was completed on December 19.

On January 27, 2016, Nexstar Broadcasting Group—which owned WLYH (now WXBU and owned by Howard Stirk Holdings) from 2006 to 2015—announced that it had reached an agreement to acquire Media General. Upon consummation, WHTM became a sister station to five stations in three other Pennsylvania markets, including WYOU and WBRE-TV in Scranton–Wilkes-Barre, WTAJ-TV in Altoona, and WJET-TV and WFXP in Erie. The sale was completed on January 17, 2017.

On December 3, 2018, Nexstar announced it would acquire the assets of Chicago-based Tribune Media—which has owned Fox affiliate WPMT (channel 43) since 1996—for $6.4 billion in cash and debt. Nexstar was precluded from acquiring WPMT directly or indirectly, as FCC regulations prohibit common ownership of two or more of the four highest-rated stations in the same media market. (Furthermore, any attempt by Nexstar to assume the operations of WPMT through local marketing or shared services agreements would have been subject to regulatory hurdles that could have delayed completion of the FCC and Justice Department's review and approval process for the acquisition.) As such, Nexstar was required to sell either WPMT or WHTM to a separate, unrelated company to address the ownership conflict. On March 20, 2019, it was announced that Nexstar would keep WHTM-TV and sell WPMT to Tegna Inc., as part of the company's sale of nineteen Nexstar- and Tribune-operated stations to Tegna and the E. W. Scripps Company in separate deals worth $1.32 billion; along with Scranton sister station WNEP-TV (which was also acquired by Tegna as part of the spin-offs), this made WPMT among the first television properties in Pennsylvania for Tegna.

Nexstar acquired Tegna for $6.2 billion in a deal announced in August 2025 and completed on March 19, 2026. A temporary restraining order issued one week later by the U.S. District Court for the Eastern District of California, later escalated to a preliminary injunction, has prevented WPMT from being integrated into WHTM.

== News operation ==
WHTM-TV presently broadcasts 33 1/2 hours of locally produced newscasts each week (with 5 1/2 hours each weekday and three hours each on Saturdays and Sundays). In addition to its main studios, WHTM operates news bureaus at The York Dispatch offices on North George Street (I-83 Business) in Downtown York, on North Main Street (US 11 SB) in Downtown Chambersburg, in Downtown Lebanon and near the square in Carlisle. News programming on the station began with its sign-on as WTPA in 1953, with 15-minute newscasts at 12:15, 6:30 and 11 p.m.

WHTM has long placed second in the ratings among the market's newscasts, though in recent years it has closed the gap with longtime ratings leader WGAL. Generally, WHTM leads the way in the market's northern counties, such as Dauphin (including the state capital of Harrisburg), Cumberland (including Carlisle), and Perry. WGAL has stayed in first mainly due to its dominance of York and Lancaster counties, which contain the majority of the market's population. Starting in 2012, WGAL began experiencing declines in news viewership, the largest occurring in May 2013; WHTM saw consistent growth, including significant gains during that same sweeps period. That July, WHTM-TV beat WGAL for the first time at 5 p.m. among adults 25–54, while also experiencing ratings increases in other time periods, including at 6 p.m. and created a virtual tie with WGAL at noon. For the November 2013 ratings period, WHTM was the only television station in the market to show significant growth in all newscasts. WGAL's news viewership dropped in every single time period that month, as did WHP-TV. WHTM's morning, 5 and 6 p.m. newscasts all saw gains of at least one rating point and in some cases, in excess of five share points.

On October 14, 2011, WHTM became the third television station in Central Pennsylvania to begin broadcasting its local newscasts in high definition; news video from the field is presented in HD, as WHTM upgraded its ENG vehicles, satellite truck, studio and field cameras and other equipment to broadcast news footage from the field in high definition, in addition to segments broadcast from the main studio. On January 13, 2012, WHTM upgraded its weather graphics to HD.

On January 25, 2019, WHTM moved into their new newsroom, offices, and studio, which was in the works last year in 2018 when groundbreaking construction on the expansion began. It debuted its first broadcast on January 27, 2019. The new building sits right behind their old building (that they used for decades), which remains fully renovated, and remains as office space for the station.

=== Awards ===
Over the years, WHTM has earned numerous Emmy nominations and wins. In 2014 the station was nominated for 26 Emmys, leading the Mid-Atlantic chapter of NATAS in total nominations. This was more than all other stations in the local market combined and more than all stations in Pittsburgh and Philadelphia. In 2013, the station received 16 Emmy nominations, including in the "News Excellence" category. The station's coverage of the trial of Jerry Sandusky, and its Saturday morning and 11 p.m. newscasts, and various members of the station's news staff were also nominated for Regional Emmys for various stories and newscasts. WHTM has repeatedly been recognized with the Pennsylvania Associated Press Broadcasters Association's Joe Snyder Award for Outstanding News Service, including in 2013. That year, WHTM also received seven first place awards from the Associated Press, including for its Sandusky trial coverage, as well as a Pennsylvania Association of Broadcasters award for its investigative reporting and in spot news for its coverage of the kidnapping of a local college student. In 2014, the PAB awarded WHTM with Outstanding Website for abc27.com, Outstanding Breaking News Report for coverage of a major tanker truck explosion on I-81 in Dauphin County and Outstanding Feature Report for a series on the legalization of medical marijuana in Pennsylvania.

== Technical information ==
=== Subchannels ===
Subchannels of WHTM-TV and WLYH
License	Subchannel	Res.	Short name	Programming
WHTM-TV	27.1	720p	WHTM-HD	ABC
WHTM-TV	27.2	480i	ION	Ion
WHTM-TV	27.3	480i	GRIT	Grit
WHTM-TV	27.4	480i	Laff	Laff
WLYH	49.1	720p	WLYH-HD	Religious independent

On November 30, 2015, WHTM 27.2 replaced Retro TV with Ion Television.

Sometime in 2020, WHTM-DT3 replaced getTV with Dabl. In June 2022, Dabl was replaced with Grit.

=== Analog-to-digital conversion ===
WHTM-TV signed on its digital signal on VHF channel 10 in 1999. The station discontinued regular programming on its analog signal, over UHF channel 27, on June 12, 2009, as part of the federally mandated transition from analog to digital television. The station's digital signal remained on its pre-transition VHF channel 10, (this forced NBC owned-and-operated station WCAU in Philadelphia to continue broadcasting its digital signal on channel 34), using virtual channel 27.

=== 2021 power increase and antenna change ===
WHTM-TV completed work on its construction permit on October 24, 2021. The station increased its power to 28.1 kW and rotated its antenna 180 degrees to improve its signal in the main population area of the television market, including Dauphin, Lancaster, York and Lebanon counties. The station previously had its antenna turned to the west to originally protect the analog signal of Philadelphia's WCAU during the digital transition in the 2000s and prior to 2009.

=== LPTV simulcasts ===
In addition, to improve its market coverage, WHTM's main channel (27.1) is simulcast in high definition as a subchannel on four low-power television stations. These LPTV stations are operated by the owner of WLYH, which shares transmitter facilities with WHTM.

- W03CE-D 3 Red Lion–Harrisburg
- WLZH-LD 14 Red Lion
- W21EU-D 21 Harrisburg
- W30FH-D 30 Chambersburg

In addition to these four repeaters, WHTM also uses two low-powered repeaters of WLYH that have converted to ATSC 3.0, WLHY-LD and W16EJ-D, both in Harrisburg.
