= WPMT =

Television station in York, Pennsylvania

- York–Harrisburg–Lancaster–; Lebanon, Pennsylvania; United States
- City: York, Pennsylvania
- Channels: Digital: 36 (UHF), shared with WITF-TV; Virtual: 43
- Branding: Fox 43

Programming
- Affiliations: 43.1: Fox; 43.2: Antenna TV

Ownership
- Owner: Tegna Inc., a subsidiary of Nexstar Media Group; (Tegna Broadcast Holdings, LLC)
- Sister stations: Nexstar: WHTM-TV

History
- First air date: December 21, 1952
- Former call signs: WSBA-TV (1952–1983)
- Former channel numbers: Analog: 43 (UHF, 1952–2009); Digital: 47 (UHF, 2004–2018)
- Former affiliations: ABC (1952–1963); CBS (1963–1983); Independent (1983–1986); The WB (secondary, 1995–2006)
- Call sign meaning: "Pennsylvania Movie Time", in reference to its movie-heavy format as an independent in the 1980s

Technical information
- Licensing authority: FCC
- Facility ID: 10213
- ERP: 84 kW
- HAAT: 431 m (1,414 ft)
- Transmitter coordinates: 40°20′43.6″N 76°52′7.6″W
- Translator(s): W20EU-D 20 Chambersburg

Links
- Public license information: Public file; LMS
- Website: fox43.com

WPMT (channel 43) is a television station licensed to York, Pennsylvania, United States, serving as the Fox affiliate for the Susquehanna Valley region. It is owned by the Tegna subsidiary of Nexstar Media Group; Nexstar also owns ABC affiliate WHTM-TV (channel 27). WPMT's studios are located on South Queen Street in Spring Garden Township (with a York mailing address). Through a channel sharing agreement with PBS member WITF-TV (channel 33), the two stations transmit using WITF-TV's spectrum from an antenna in Susquehanna Township.

WPMT is also rebroadcast on a translator, W20EU-D in Chambersburg, Pennsylvania.

== History ==
=== Early history ===
The station first signed on the air on December 21, 1952, as WSBA-TV, originally operating as an ABC affiliate. It was owned by the Susquehanna Radio Corporation, a subsidiary of the Susquehanna Pfaltzgraff conglomerate, along with radio station WSBA (910 AM). It was one of the first commercially licensed UHF television stations in the United States, signing on the air just over three months after KPTV in Portland, Oregon, which originally broadcast on channel 27 when it signed on in 1952, before moving to VHF channel 12 five years later. WSBA-TV was one of four stations vying to be the first UHF television station to transmit a signal, using commercially-manufactured equipment, as KPTV was using experimental equipment provided by RCA. The four prospective television stations received their UHF transmitters at the same time from the RCA Victor facility in Camden, New Jersey. Newspaper records from 1952 show WSBA signed on at 2:06 a.m. on December 21, beating WBRE-TV in Wilkes-Barre, WFPG-TV in Atlantic City, New Jersey, and WSBT-TV in South Bend, Indiana. This makes WPMT the oldest continuously broadcasting UHF station in the country.

In 1963, the station became a CBS affiliate and joined WHP-TV (channel 21) in Harrisburg and WLYH-TV (channel 15) in Lebanon to form the Keystone Network. The three stations provided a strong combined signal with about a 55% overlap. Initially, WHP-TV, WLYH, and WSBA aired the same programming despite separate ownership. By the late 1960s, while all three stations ran most of the CBS programming schedule, WHP-TV ran different local programming during non-network hours, while WLYH and WSBA continued to simulcast for nearly the entire broadcast day. WHP ran CBS shows that WSBA and WLYH preempted, while the latter two stations ran programming that WHP preempted, allowing most of the market to view the entire CBS schedule. All three ran most of the CBS lineup, duplicating over three-quarters of the network's programs. This arrangement was necessary for the days before cable gained significant penetration.

In April 1983, Susquehanna sold WSBA-TV to Idaho-based Mohawk Broadcasting, who changed its call letters to the current WPMT. The station signed off in August and returned to the air the following month as the Susquehanna Valley's first general entertainment independent station. Until then, the only over-the-air source of non-network programming in South Central Pennsylvania was WGCB-TV (channel 49) in Red Lion, a religious station that had been on the air since 1979. WPMT was a typical UHF independent with a schedule heavy on cartoons, sitcoms, movies, dramas, sports and westerns.

=== As a Fox affiliate ===
On October 9, 1986, WPMT became one of the charter affiliates of the newly launched Fox network. From 1990 to 2004, WPMT featured original children's programming hosted by the station's mascot, a clown named Pete McTee (a play on the station's call letters). Renaissance Communications acquired WPMT in 1990. The station was acquired by Tribune Broadcasting following the company's purchase of Renaissance in 1996. A year earlier, WPMT had added programming from The WB, half-owned by Tribune, in off-hours. However, cable customers could watch the full WB schedule on then-sister station WPHL-TV from Philadelphia.

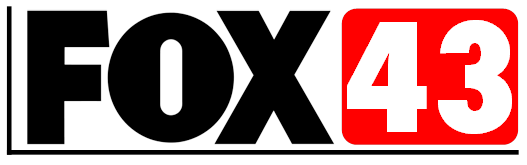
Former WPMT logo, used from 2007 to 2009.

Sinclair Broadcast Group, owner of WHP-TV, entered into an agreement to acquire Tribune Media in 2017. Sinclair intended to keep WHP-TV and designated WPMT and eight other stations to be sold to Standard Media Group. However, the transaction was designated in July 2018 for hearing by an FCC administrative law judge, and Tribune moved to terminate the deal in August 2018.

In 2019, Nexstar Media Group, owner of ABC affiliate WHTM-TV (channel 27), announced it would acquire Tribune. Nexstar opted to retain WHTM and sold WPMT to Tegna.

On August 19, 2025, Nexstar announced it would acquire Tegna itself. Unlike when the Nexstar-Tribune deal occurred, the "top four" rule had been struck down in federal court. The transaction was completed on March 19, 2026. A temporary restraining order issued one week later by the U.S. District Court for the Eastern District of California, later escalated to a preliminary injunction, has prevented WPMT from being integrated into WHTM.

== News operation ==
WPMT presently broadcasts 47 hours of locally produced newscasts each week (with nine hours each weekday and one hour each on Saturdays and Sundays); in regards to the number of hours devoted to news programming, it is the highest local newscast output of any television station in the Harrisburg–Lancaster–Lebanon–York market.

As a CBS affiliate, WSBA-TV ran a small news department branded as NewsWatch 43. In 1980, the station relaunched its news department as a much larger operation, and retitled its newscasts to TeleJournal News. The station's signal prevented the competitive newscast from being seen throughout the market, however, preventing it from adequately competing against the established news departments of the other local Big Three network affiliates in the Susquehanna Valley (including NBC affiliate and longtime market leader WGAL, ABC affiliate WHTM, fellow CBS affiliates WHP-TV and WLYH); as a result, the news department was discontinued in 1983.

With Fox preparing to heighten its profile once Fox took over the contractual rights to the National Football Conference television package in the fall of 1994 (as part of December 1993 contract deal with the NFL that transferred the NFC contract from CBS), Fox began urging management at owned-and-operated and affiliated stations that had limited to no local news presence to develop full-scale news departments. Renaissance Communications agreed to Fox's request and commenced development of a full-scale news department for Channel 43. Long-form newscasts would return to WPMT on September 12, 1994, when the station premiered its flagship prime time newscast, Fox 43 News at Ten. Originally airing Monday through Fridays for a half-hour, it was first anchored by Evan Forrester and Donya Archer, who were accompanied by weather anchor Susan Schrack and sports director Tom Werme. (As of 2021, the weeknight editions of the 10 p.m. broadcast compete with prime time newscasts on CW affiliate WHP-DT3 [channel 21.3], and MeTV affiliate WGAL-DT2 [channel 8.2].) Half-hour Saturday and Sunday editions of the newscast were subsequently added on January 7, 1995; this was followed by the expansion of the weeknight editions of the newscast to one hour on September 13, 1997, with the weekend editions following suit on January 9, 1999.

News programming on Channel 43 expanded on January 16, 2006, with the addition of the Fox 43 Morning News, an hour-long weekday morning newscast at 7 a.m.; the newscast, which was formatted to feature updated traffic and weather segments in 10-minute intervals, gradually expanded within the next decade: the Morning News added two additional hours (expanding it to run from 5 to 8 a.m.) by September 2007 and expanded to include an 8 a.m. hour in September 2008. On February 13, 2013, WPMT expanded the weekday morning newscast to five hours (moving its start time one hour early to 4 a.m.), becoming the first and only station in the market, and the fifth Tribune-owned station to begin its morning newscast at 4 a.m. (WGAL and WHTM start their morning newscasts at 4:30, while WHP's continues to start at 5 a.m.) The weekday morning show later expanded to six hours (with the addition of a 9 a.m. block) on September 17, 2018.

On September 4, 2009, WPMT began airing a local sports highlight program called High School Football Frenzy, that airs Fridays at 6 p.m. during the high school football season. On September 21, 2009, the station debuted a half-hour weeknight newscast at 6:30, that competed against the national network newscasts on WHP, WGAL, and WHTM. The station launched a weeknight 11 p.m. newscast on January 11, 2010.

On January 15, 2011, WPMT became the first station in Central Pennsylvania and the last Tribune-owned Fox affiliate to begin broadcasting its local newscasts in high definition (rival WGAL was the first station in the market to offer local newscasts in the 16:9 format, albeit in enhanced definition widescreen in mid-December 2010; WGAL switched to full HD on August 29, 2011). WPMT was the first television station in the market to provide news video from the field in true high definition, as it upgraded its ENG vehicles, satellite truck, studio and field cameras and other equipment in order to broadcast news footage from the field in high definition, in addition to segments broadcast from the main studio.

On January 9, 2012, WPMT expanded its early evening newscast to one hour with the addition of a half-hour at 6 p.m. WPMT debuted two hour-long newscasts at 4 and 5 p.m. weekdays on August 5, 2013, while discontinuing its hour-long 6 p.m. newscast. The station's 11 p.m. newscast was discontinued the following month on September 6, and was replaced by the second incarnation of The Arsenio Hall Show (which was produced by Tribune) three days later.

== Technical information ==
=== Subchannels ===
The station's signal is multiplexed: WITF-TV and WPMT broadcast from a transmitter facility in Middle Paxton Township.

Subchannels of WITF-TV and WPMT
License	Subchannel	Res.	Short name	Programming
WITF-TV	33.1	720p	WITF	PBS
WITF-TV	33.2	480i	WITFK	PBS Kids
WPMT	43.1	720p	WPMT-DT	Fox
WPMT	43.2	480i	Antenna	Antenna TV

On October 26, 2009, WPMT launched a 24-hour news channel, known as "Fox 43 News 24/7", which is available on its second digital subchannel, and on Blue Ridge Communications digital channel 126 and Comcast digital channel 244. Programming consists of simulcasts and rebroadcasts of local news programming from the station's main channel. Beginning on January 1, 2011, WPMT began carrying the Tribune-owned network Antenna TV on digital subchannel 43.2. On July 18, 2015, WPMT began carrying This TV on digital subchannel 43.3, replacing the 24-hour news channel, known as "Fox 43 News 24/7". Fox 43 News 24/7 can still be viewed through a livestream link on their webpage. As part of a channel sharing agreement with WITF, the This TV subchannel on 43.3 was dropped.

=== Analog-to-digital conversion ===
WPMT discontinued regular programming on its analog signal, over UHF channel 43, on June 12, 2009, as part of the federally mandated transition from analog to digital television. The station's digital signal remained on its pre-transition UHF channel 47, using virtual channel 43.

WPMT sold its spectrum for $50 million in the 2016–2017 FCC incentive auction and the station will have to cease broadcasting on its current digital channel 90 days after it receives payment from the FCC. On August 31, 2017, it was announced that WPMT had entered into a channel sharing agreement with PBS member station WITF-TV.
