= Technical Design Labs =

Technical Design Labs, Inc. (TDL) (1976-1978) Xitan, Inc. (1978-1979)
- Industry: Computer hardware
- Founded: 1976
- Founder: Carl Galletti; Roger Amidon
- Defunct: 1979
- Headquarters: Princeton, New Jersey
- Products: Xitan

Technical Design Labs (TDL) was an early producer of personal computers founded in 1976 by Carl Galletti and Roger Amidon. TDL was based in Princeton, New Jersey, USA in the 1970s and early 1980s.

The company was later (1978) renamed Xitan, in honor of its primary product.

In 1979, Neil Colvin formed what was then called Phoenix Software Associates after his prior employer, Xitan, went out of business. Neil hired Dave Hirschman, a former Xitan employee.

In 1979, Carl Galletti and Roger Amidon had started a new business called Computer Design Labs that acquired the rights to all TDL software.

== Products ==
The company's Xitan had an S-100 bus and a Z80-based CPU came in two configurations: the base Alpha 1 model and the Alpha 2.

Other products from TDL for the Xitan and S-100 Z80-based computer systems:

- Zapple Monitor
- Micro-Seed a database management system for Xitan Z80 microprocessors.
- Z-Tel a text editing language for Z80 microprocessors.
- Video Display Board (VDB) for S-100 bus computers; capable of displaying text (25 rows x 80 characters) and graphics (160 x 75) that could display on a modified television.
- Interface One a 'plug-in' wiring board for development.

== See also ==
- Epson QX-10
