= Mayflower doctrine =

American federal broadcasting regulation

The Mayflower doctrine was a 1941 policy of the Federal Communications Commission that purportedly prohibited radio stations from editorializing. It was never formally announced by the FCC. Rather, it emanated from "cryptic dictum" in an FCC license renewal decision. That decision - Mayflower Broadcasting Corp., 8 FCC 333, 340 (1941) - stated that "the broadcaster shall not be an advocate." The issue under consideration was whether the network had breached its duty to the public by broadcasting editorials supporting candidates for public office. The Commission found that this practice was inconsistent with the licensee's responsibilities to the public. Its full explanation of its position was as follows: "[T]he public interest can never be served by a dedication of any broadcast facility to the support of [the licensee's] partisan ends. Radio can serve as an instrument of democracy only when devoted to the communication of information and the exchange of ideas fairly and objectively presented. A truly free radio cannot be used to advocate the cause of the licensee. It cannot be used to support the candidacies of his friends. It cannot be devoted to the support of principles he happens to regard most favorably. In brief, the broadcaster cannot be an advocate. The FCC went on to say "Freedom of speech on the radio must be broad enough to provide full and equal opportunity for the presentation to the public of all sides of public issues. Indeed, as one licensed to operate in a public domain the licensee has assumed the obligation of presenting all sides of important public questions, fairly, objectively and vithout bias. The public interest-not the private--is paramount. These requirements are inherent in the conception of public interest set up by the Communications Act as the criterion of regulation."

The Mayflower Doctrine basically reiterated an earlier FCC policy that stated that editorial content was allowable but "In carrying out the obligation to render a public service, stations are required to furnish well-rounded rather than one-sided discussions of public questions." 6 FCC ANN. REP. 55 (1940).

Perhaps because the ultimate outcome in the license renewal decision required that the station renewal submit affidavits to the commission, assuring that the station had not broadcast any editorials since September 1938, and that itintended to continue a no-editorial policy, broadcasters interpreted the decision to fully prohibit editorializing. Broadcasters also may have focused on the statement that "In brief, the broadcaster can not be an advocate" and took the decision to mean that no editorializing was permitted.

The Federal Communications Commission was created during President Franklin D. Roosevelt's administration by way of the Communications Act of 1934 [47 U.S.C. § 151 et seq]. The legislation gave the FCC the power to license and renew the license of broadcast stations. The fundamental principle of this power was "promotion of the public interest, convenience, and necessity" as expressed over three dozen times in the statute. As to licensing authority, Section 307 provides that "(a) The Commission, if public convenience, interest, or necessity will be served thereby, subject to the limitations of this Act, shall grant to any applicant therefor a station license provided for by this Act." Indeed, this key concept was carried over from The Radio Act of 1927 [47 U.S.C. 4 (repealed 1934)].

Although the general statement of purpose of the Act expressed public interest in terms of "for the purpose of the national defense, for the purpose of promoting safety of life and property through the use of wire and radio communication" (47 U.S.C. §1), in operation, it became clear that the FCC interpreted the "public convenience, interest, or necessity" language more broadly.

Radio was the main source of mass media during the early- to mid-1900s. In the 1930s and 1940s, radio had become perhaps the most effective large-scale means of reaching the public. The power of the medium, together with the legislative mandate to premise licensing on the "public interest, convenience, or necessity" gave rise to the premise that broadcasters serve "as a trustee for the public [McIntire v. Wm. Penn Broadcasting Co. of Philadelphia, 151 F.2d 597 (3d Cir., 1945)] and was thought to have a "duty to maintain an open, unbiased, non-sef-serving administration for the benefit of the community".

For the FCC, ensuring this outcome necessarily entailed some sort of oversight of content, which created tension between the freedom of the press clause of the 1st Amendment, as well as Section 327 of the Act, which provided that "Nothing in this chapter shall be understood or construed to give the Commission the power of censorship over the radio communications or signals transmitted by any radio station, and no regulation or condition shall be promulgated or fixed by the Commission which shall interfere with the right of free speech by means of radio communication."

At the time of the Mayflower decision, editorial content on radio was uncommon. The National Association of Broadcasters discouraged the practice in its 1939 code, which had provisions opposing news editorials and biased presentation of news. In August 1945, the National Association of Broadcasters dropped its policy that air time for controversial issues should not be sold, except for political broadcasts. As a result, the FCC was confronting a growing number of cases involving controversial issues,

To address the claim of broadcasters to be confused about when, where and how to editorialize, the FCC in 1946 issue guidance known as the Blue Book. Among other things, the guidance pointed out that the level of local programming devoted to discussion of public issues would be critical to stations come license-renewal time, no doubt exacerbating concern on the part of the broadcasters that editorializing, though not actually prohibited by the Mayflower Doctrine, would jeopardize their license renewals if not done sufficiently or in the right manner.

Reaction to the Blue Book spurred the broadcasters to action. The National Association of Broadcasters sought an FCC hearing, which took place in 1948. Over eight days in early 1948, as described in the introduction to the Fairness Doctrine (formerly known as "In the Matter of Editorializing by Broadcast Licensees") the FCC examined two questions. Though the Mayflower Doctrine never prohibited editorializing, the FCC decided to "determine whether the expression of editorial opinions by broadcast station licensees on matters of public interest and controversy is consistent with their obligations to operate their stations in the public interest."

On 8 June 1949, the FCC released its decision, effectively terminating the Mayflower Doctrine and replacing it with the Fairness Doctrine.

== See also ==
- Fairness Doctrine
- Free speech
- Zapple Doctrine
