= Personal attack rule =

Corollary to the FCC fairness doctrine

The personal attack rule was a corollary to the Federal Communications Commission's fairness doctrine that mandated response time for an individual or group attacked during "origination cablecasting" that focused on a controversial issue of public importance. After the fairness doctrine was repealed in 1987, the personal attack rule persisted until 2000, when it was first suspended and then abolished after an FCC comment period.

== Mechanics ==
The personal attack rule was invoked whenever "an attack is made upon the honesty, character, integrity, or like personal qualities of an identified person or group" during broadcast or original cable TV programming while discussing "controversial issues of public importance." After such an attack, within a week the broadcast station or cable provider responsible for the programming was required to give the person or group attacked the following:

1. notification and identification of the cablecast;
2. a script, tape or accurate summary of the attack; and
3. an offer of a reasonable opportunity to respond over the cable facilities.

Failure to abide by the personal attack rule could have resulted in FCC sanctions or a refusal to renew a broadcaster's license; however, these sanctions did not include a civil action by the party attacked and not given a satisfactory opportunity to respond.

Attacks by political candidates and their supporters during mandated airtime; attacks made during newscasts, interviews, and on-the-spot news coverage; and attacks on foreign groups or foreign public figures were excluded from the rule.

== History ==
The personal attack rule was promulgated by the FCC under the authority of the Communications Act of 1934 and first upheld by the Supreme Court in its 1969 Red Lion Broadcasting v. FCC decision. As the Third Circuit in Lechtner v. Brownyard wrote, "The personal attack rule is, thus, a special application of 'the general fairness requirement that issues be presented, and presented with coverage of competing views....' Red Lion, supra, 395 U.S. at 378, 89 S.Ct. at 1800. The only variation is that the broadcaster is not given the option of presenting the attacked party's side himself or of choosing a third party to represent that side: the person attacked is afforded the opportunity to rebut."

Even after the end of the closely related fairness doctrine, the personal attack rule continued to be enforced until 2000. The rule, however, came to an end after the U.S. Court of Appeals for the D.C. Circuit ordered an immediate end with its ruling in Radio-Television News Directors Association, where the court chastised the agency for years of inaction in addressing the rule.
