= Zapple doctrine =

Part of a specific provision of the fairness doctrine, FCC policy

The Zapple doctrine pertained to a particular sort of political speech in the United States, for which a candidate or his supporters bought air time but the candidate himself did not actually participate in the broadcast. The content could be supportive of the candidate, or be used to criticize his political opponent(s). It went into effect in 1970 and was eponymously named for its proponent, public interest attorney Nicholas Zapple.

The Zapple doctrine came into existence as an addition to the FCC fairness doctrine. The fairness doctrine was a Federal Communications Commission (FCC) policy instated in June 1949. It required broadcasters to present multiple viewpoints about controversial matters of public importance. For the first time, radio station licensees were permitted to editorialize, but only if two or more perspectives were included. (The fairness doctrine replaced the previous Mayflower doctrine, which did not allow any editorial content at all.)

== Origin ==
The FCC's political broadcasting rules required that equal time be offered to all political candidates, and only to the candidates. Candidate supporters and spokespeople were excluded from the provisions of the equal-time rule.

In May 1970, U.S. Senate Commerce Committee counselor Nicholas Zapple argued to the FCC that the fairness doctrine must also be applicable to a political candidate's spokesperson and supporters. In other words, if one candidate's supporters were allowed to buy air time, then supporters of opposing candidates should have the opportunity to buy a comparable amount of air time for their candidate(s). Similarly, if a broadcasting station gave free air time to a political candidate, then that broadcaster should be required to offer free coverage to the opposing candidate too.

In order to uphold the spirit of the fairness doctrine, the FCC responded by ruling that all similar parties must have "quasi-equal opportunity", that is, they should be treated similarly. This decision became known as the Zapple ruling, and eventually, the Zapple doctrine. Under the terms of Section 315 of the Communications Act of 1934, 23 FCC 2d 707 (1970), the Zapple doctrine applied to purchase of broadcast time by major political party candidates only.

== Demise of the fairness doctrine ==
By 1985, the FCC was concerned that the fairness doctrine might have a chilling effect, which was the very opposite of the policy's original intent of encouraging fair and balanced coverage: "In order to avoid the requirement to go out and find contrasting viewpoints on every issue raised in a story, some journalists simply avoided any coverage of some controversial issues." In addition, journalists felt that it infringed on their rights of free speech under the First Amendment. In August 1985, the FCC decided to suspend the fairness doctrine (it was an FCC policy but not mandated by Congress).

== Zapple doctrine 1985–2014 ==
Although the fairness doctrine was suspended, the Zapple doctrine remained in effect as an FCC ruling for the next three decades.

=== Wisconsin election complaint ===
On May 23, 2012, the FCC was asked to respond to a political programming complaint, made against a broadcast licensee, Capstar TX LLC (a subsidiary of Clear Channel Communications, now iHeartMedia) by supporters of Tom Barrett, the Democratic candidate for Governor of Wisconsin. The Barrett supporters alleged that Capstar would not give them any free airtime on WISN radio, in order to respond to statements previously aired on WISN in support of Scott Walker, the Republican candidate for office in the 2012 election. Walker's supporters had received free air time from WISN for political campaigning purposes, and the complaint also encompassed Journal Communications's WTMJ under the same arrangement. Barrett supporters based their complaint on WISN's violation of the Zapple doctrine.

The FCC responded on May 8, 2014, acknowledging that WISN and WTMJ had refused to provide air time to Barrett campaign supporters, in violation of the Zapple doctrine. However, the FCC ruled that there was no violation of the law: "Given the fact that the Zapple Doctrine was based on an interpretation of the fairness doctrine, which has no current legal effect, we conclude that the Zapple Doctrine similarly has no current legal effect."

=== Unenforceable ===
In re: Capstar TX LLC was the catalyst for the FCC's decision that the Zapple doctrine was not enforcable.

The agency [FCC] tasked with protecting the public interest in broadcasting has decided that WISN and WTMJ, two publicly-licensed radio stations in Milwaukee, were allowed to give away all the free time they wanted to the supporters of one candidate (in this case, Gov. Walker), without allowing supporters of his Democratic recall opponent (Tom Barrett) any free airtime at all.
