= Equal-time rule =

U.S. radio and television law

The equal-time rule (47 U.S. Code § 315 - Candidates for public office) specifies that American radio and television broadcast stations must provide equivalent access to competing political candidates. This means, for example, that if a station broadcasts a message by a candidate, it must offer the same amount of time on the same terms (in, say, prime time) to an opposing candidate. Although the equal opportunities rule is often cited as not applying to cable, Section 315 of the Communications Act does state that for this purpose, “The term “broadcasting station” includes a community antenna television system..”

== Details ==
This rule originated in §18 of the Radio Act of 1927 which established the Federal Radio Commission; it was later superseded by the Communications Act of 1934, with the FRC becoming the FCC, the Federal Communications Commission. A related provision, in §315(b), requires that broadcasters offer time to candidates at the same rate as their "most favored advertiser".

The equal-time rule was created due to concerns that broadcast stations could easily manipulate the outcome of elections by presenting just one point of view and excluding other candidates.

There are several exceptions to the equal-time rule;

- If the airing was within a documentary, bona fide news interview, scheduled newscast, or an on-the-spot news event, the equal-time rule does not apply.
  - The FCC has classified shows such as Entertainment Tonight (stating that its role "is not to decide, by some qualitative analysis, whether one kind of news story is more bona fide than another"), as well as talk shows such as The View and Anderson, as being news programs for the purpose of the equal-time rule.
  - In 2026, current FCC chairman Brendan Carr adopted guidance specifying that this exception may not apply to appearances by candidates on talk shows that are not bona fide news programs. The FCC has, in particular, targeted ABC's long-running The View for violating the equal-time rule by featuring an appearance by 2026 Democratic Senate candidate James Talarico.
- The equal-time rule was suspended by Congress in 1960 to permit the inaugural presidential debates between Richard Nixon and John F. Kennedy. Since 1983, political debates not hosted directly by a station or network are considered "news events", and as a result, they are not subject to the rule. Usually, these debates are coordinated through a third party (such as the Commission on Presidential Debates, a state broadcaster's association, a newspaper independent of a television station or network, or the League of Women Voters), and use eligibility criteria to restrict participation to the top candidates without needing to offer airtime to minor-party or independent candidates, or inflammatory candidates who intend only to disrupt the proceedings.
- Advertisements: if a candidate has more money than an opponent, they can still get more time on the public airwaves without their ads counting towards the equal time rule.

When candidates for office have careers in media, the rule can affect previously produced material. When Ronald Reagan and Donald Trump ran for president, television networks did not broadcast films or programs they appeared in. Localized invocations of the rule apply in elections for lower office, with television stations revising their schedules if they broadcast within the state or district where the candidate in question is running.

== Fairness doctrines ==
The equal-time rule should not be confused with the now-defunct FCC fairness doctrine, which dealt with presenting balanced points of view on matters of public importance.

The Zapple doctrine (part of a specific provision of the fairness doctrine) was similar to the equal-time rule but applied to different political campaign participants. The equal-time rule applies to the political candidate only. The Zapple doctrine had the same purpose and requirements of equivalent coverage opportunity as the equal-time rule, but its scope included the candidate's spokesman and supporters, not the candidate.
