= WLCH-FM =

- Lancaster, Pennsylvania; United States
- Frequency: 91.3 MHz
- Branding: Radio Centro

Programming
- Languages: English, Spanish
- Format: Variety

Ownership
- Owner: Spanish American Civic Association For Equality

History
- First air date: September 14, 1987
- Former call signs: WLCH (1987–2024)

Technical information
- Licensing authority: FCC
- Facility ID: 61632
- Class: A
- ERP: 160 watts
- HAAT: 41 meters (135 ft)
- Transmitter coordinates: 40°04′13.3″N 76°17′17.8″W
- Translator: See table below

Links
- Public license information: Public file; LMS
- Webcast: Listen live
- Website: wlchradio.org

WLCH-FM (91.3 FM, "Radio Centro") is a non-commercial public FM radio station licensed to serve Lancaster, Pennsylvania. The station is owned by the Spanish American Civic Association For Equality, Inc., and broadcasts a variety format. Its broadcast tower is located in Manheim Township north of Lancaster at (40°04′13.6″N 76°17′18.5″W).

WLCH-FM is one of 33 owned and operated Hispanic Public Radio stations in the United States.

== History ==
WLCH signed on for the first time on September 14, 1987.

== Translators ==
WLCH-FM programming is broadcast on the following translator:

Call sign	Frequency	City of license	FID	ERP (W)	HAAT	Class	Transmitter coordinates	FCC info
W262AQ	100.3 FM	York, Pennsylvania	143365	19	76.8 m (252 ft)	D	39°58′7.4″N 76°37′28.9″W	LMS
