= Fairness doctrine =

Former US broadcasting policy (1949–87)

The fairness doctrine of the United States Federal Communications Commission (FCC), introduced in 1949, was a policy that required the holders of broadcast licenses both to present controversial issues of public importance and to do so in a manner that fairly reflected differing viewpoints. In 1987, the FCC abolished the fairness doctrine, prompting some to urge its reintroduction through either Commission policy or congressional legislation. The FCC removed the rule that implemented the policy from the Federal Register in August 2011.

The fairness doctrine had two basic elements: It required broadcasters to devote some of their airtime to discussing controversial matters of public interest, and to air contrasting views regarding those matters. Stations were given wide latitude as to how to provide contrasting views: It could be done through news segments, public affairs shows, or editorials. The doctrine did not require equal time for opposing views but required that contrasting viewpoints be presented. The demise of this FCC rule has been cited as a contributing factor in the rising level of political polarization in the United States.

While the original purpose of the doctrine was to ensure that viewers were exposed to a diversity of viewpoints, it was used by the Kennedy, Johnson, and Nixon administrations to combat political opponents operating on talk radio and television. In Red Lion Broadcasting Co. v. FCC (1969), the United States Supreme Court upheld the FCC's general right to enforce the fairness doctrine where channels were limited; however, the court did not rule that the FCC was obliged to do so. The courts reasoned that the scarcity of the broadcast spectrum, which limited the opportunity for access to the airwaves, created a need for the doctrine. The fairness doctrine is not the same as the equal-time rule, which is still in place. The fairness doctrine deals with discussion of controversial issues, while the equal-time rule deals only with political candidates.

== Origins ==
In 1938, Lawrence J. Flynn, a former Yankee Network employee, challenged the license of John Shepard III's WAAB in Boston, and lodged a complaint about WNAC (Boston). Flynn asserted that these stations were being used to air one-sided political viewpoints and broadcast attacks, including editorials, against local and federal politicians whom Shepard opposed. The FCC requested that Shepard provide details about these programs. To appease the commission, the Yankee Network agreed to drop the editorials. Flynn created a company called Mayflower Broadcasting and tried to get the FCC to award him WAAB's license. The FCC refused. In 1941, the commission made a ruling that came to be known as the Mayflower Doctrine, which declared that radio stations, due to their public interest obligations, must remain neutral in matters of news and politics, and they were not allowed to give editorial support to any particular political position or candidate. In 1949, the FCC's Editorializing Report repealed the Mayflower doctrine, which since 1941 had forbidden on-air editorializing. This laid the foundation for the fairness doctrine, by reaffirming the FCC's holding that licensees must not use their stations "for the private interest, whims or caprices [of licensees], but in a manner which will serve the community generally."

The FCC Report established two forms of regulation on broadcasters: to provide adequate coverage of public issues, and to ensure that coverage fairly represented opposing views. The second rule required broadcasters to provide reply time to issue-oriented citizens. Broadcasters could therefore trigger fairness doctrine complaints without editorializing. The commission required neither of the fairness doctrine's obligations before 1949. Until then broadcasters had to satisfy only general "public interest" standards of the Communications Act. The doctrine remained a matter of general policy and was applied on a case-by-case basis until 1967, when certain provisions of the doctrine were incorporated into FCC regulations. In 1969, the United States courts of appeals, in an opinion written by Warren Burger, directed the FCC to revoke Lamar Broadcasting's license for television station WLBT due to the station's segregationist politics and ongoing censorship of NBC network news coverage of the U.S. civil rights movement.

== Application of the doctrine by the FCC ==
In 1974, the Federal Communications Commission stated that the Congress had delegated the power to mandate a system of "access, either free or paid, for person or groups wishing to express a viewpoint on a controversial public issue" but that it had not yet exercised that power because licensed broadcasters had "voluntarily" complied with the "spirit" of the doctrine. It warned:

Should future experience indicate that the doctrine [of 'voluntary compliance'] is inadequate, either in its expectations or in its results, the Commission will have the opportunity—and the responsibility—for such further reassessment and action as would be mandated.

In one landmark case, the FCC argued that teletext was a new technology that created soaring demand for a limited resource, and thus could be exempt from the fairness doctrine. The Telecommunications Research and Action Center (TRAC) and Media Access Project (MAP) argued that teletext transmissions should be regulated like any other airwave technology, hence the fairness doctrine was applicable, and must be enforced by the FCC. In 1986, Judges Robert Bork and Antonin Scalia of the United States Court of Appeals for the District of Columbia Circuit concluded that the fairness doctrine did apply to teletext, but that the FCC was not required to apply it. In a 1987 case, Meredith Corp. v. FCC, two other judges on the same court declared that Congress did not mandate the doctrine and the FCC did not have to continue to enforce it.

== Decisions of the United States Supreme Court ==
In Red Lion Broadcasting Co. v. FCC, 395 U.S. 367 (1969), the U.S. Supreme Court upheld, by a vote of 8–0, the constitutionality of the fairness doctrine in a case of an on-air personal attack, in response to challenges that the doctrine violated the First Amendment to the U.S. Constitution. The case began when journalist Fred J. Cook, after the publication of his Goldwater: Extremist of the Right, was the topic of discussion by Billy James Hargis on his daily Christian Crusade radio broadcast on WGCB in Red Lion, Pennsylvania. Cook sued arguing that the fairness doctrine entitled him to free air time to respond to the personal attacks. Although similar laws are unconstitutional when applied to the press, the court cited a Senate report (S. Rep. No. 562, 86th Cong., 1st Sess., 8-9 [1959]) stating that radio stations could be regulated in this way because of the limited public airwaves at the time. Writing for the court, Justice Byron White declared:

A license permits broadcasting, but the licensee has no constitutional right to be the one who holds the license or to monopolize a radio frequency to the exclusion of his fellow citizens. There is nothing in the First Amendment which prevents the Government from requiring a licensee to share his frequency with others. ... It is the right of the viewers and listeners, not the right of the broadcasters, which is paramount.

The court did not see how the fairness doctrine went against the First Amendment's goal of creating an informed public. The fairness doctrine required that those who were talked about be given chance to respond to the statements made by broadcasters. The court believed that this helped create a more informed public. Justice White explained that, without this doctrine, station owners would only have people on the air who agreed with their opinions. Throughout his opinion, Justice White argued that radio frequencies, and by extension, television stations, should be used to educate listeners, or viewers, about controversial issues in a way that is fair and non-biased so that they can create their own opinions. In 1969, the court "ruled unanimously that the Fairness Doctrine was not only constitutional, but essential to democracy. The public airwaves should not just express the opinions of those who can pay for air time; they must allow the electorate to be informed about all sides of controversial issues." The court also warned that if the doctrine ever restrained speech, then its constitutionality should be reconsidered. Justice William O. Douglas did not participate, but later wrote that he would have dissented because the Constitutional guarantee of Freedom of the press was absolute.

In the case of Miami Herald Publishing Co. v. Tornillo, 418 U.S. 241 (1974), Chief Justice Warren Burger wrote (for a unanimous court), "Government-enforced right of access inescapably dampens the vigor and limits the variety of public debate", which differs from Red Lion v. FCC in that it applies to a newspaper. Unlike a broadcaster, a newspaper is unlicensed and can theoretically face an unlimited number of competitors. In 1984, the Supreme Court ruled that Congress could not forbid editorials by non-profit stations that received grants from the Corporation for Public Broadcasting, as ruled in FCC v. League of Women Voters of California, 468 U.S. 364 (1984). The court's 5–4 majority decision by William J. Brennan Jr. stated that while many now considered that expanding sources of communication had made the fairness doctrine's limits unnecessary:

We are not prepared, however, to reconsider our longstanding approach without some signal from Congress or the FCC that technological developments have advanced so far that some revision of the system of broadcast regulation may be required. (footnote 11)

After noting that the FCC was considering repealing the fairness doctrine rules on editorials and personal attacks out of fear that those rules might be "chilling speech", the court added:

Of course, the Commission may, in the exercise of its discretion, decide to modify or abandon these rules, and we express no view on the legality of either course. As we recognized in Red Lion, however, were it to be shown by the Commission that the fairness doctrine '[has] the net effect of reducing rather than enhancing' speech, we would then be forced to reconsider the constitutional basis of our decision in that case. (footnote 12)

== Use as a political weapon ==
The fairness doctrine has been used by various administrations to harass political opponents on the radio. Bill Ruder, Assistant Secretary of Commerce in the Kennedy administration, acknowledged that "Our massive strategy [in the early 1960s] was to use the Fairness Doctrine to challenge and harass right-wing broadcasters and hope that the challenges would be so costly to them that they would be inhibited and decide it was too expensive to continue." Former Kennedy FCC staffer Martin Firestone wrote a memo to the Democratic National Committee on strategies to combat small rural radio stations unfriendly to Democrats:

The right-wingers operate on a strictly cash basis and it is for this reason that they are carried by so many small stations. Were our efforts to be continued on a year-round basis, we would find that many of these stations would consider the broadcasts of these programs bothersome and burdensome (especially if they are ultimately required to give us free time) and would start dropping the programs from their broadcast schedule.

It has been alleged that Democratic Party operatives were deeply involved in the Red Lion case since the start of the litigation. Wayne Phillips, a Democratic National Committee staffer described the aftermath of the ruling, explaining that "Even more important than the free radio time was the effectiveness of this operation in inhibiting the political activity of these right-wing broadcasts". The use of the fairness doctrine by the National Council for Civic Responsibility (NCCR) was to force right-wing radio stations to air rebuttals against the opinions expressed on their radio stations.

== Revocation ==
=== Basic doctrine ===
In 1985, under FCC Chairman Mark S. Fowler, a communications attorney who had served on Ronald Reagan's presidential campaign staff in 1976 and 1980, the FCC released its report on General Fairness Doctrine Obligations stating that the doctrine hurt the public interest and violated free speech rights guaranteed by the First Amendment. The commission could not come to a determination as to whether the doctrine had been enacted by Congress through its 1959 Amendment to Section 315 of the Communications Act. In response to the 1986 Telecommunications Research & Action Center v. F.C.C. decision, the 99th Congress directed the FCC to examine alternatives to the fairness doctrine and to submit a report to Congress on the subject. In 1987, in Meredith Corporation v. F.C.C. the case was returned to the FCC with a directive to consider whether the doctrine had been "self-generated pursuant to its general congressional authorization or specifically mandated by Congress."

The FCC opened an inquiry inviting public comment on alternative means for administrating and enforcing the fairness doctrine. In its 1987 report, the alternatives—including abandoning a case-by-case enforcement approach, replacing the doctrine with open access time for all members of the public, doing away with the personal attack rule, and eliminating certain other aspects of the doctrine—were rejected by the FCC for various reasons. On August 4, 1987, under FCC Chairman Dennis R. Patrick, the FCC abolished the doctrine by a 4–0 vote, in the Syracuse Peace Council decision, which was upheld by a panel of the Appeals Court for the D.C. Circuit in February 1989, though the court stated in their decision that they made "that determination without reaching the constitutional issue." The FCC suggested in Syracuse Peace Council that because of the many media voices in the marketplace, the doctrine be deemed unconstitutional, stating:

The intrusion by government into the content of programming occasioned by the enforcement of [the fairness doctrine] restricts the journalistic freedom of broadcasters ... [and] actually inhibits the presentation of controversial issues of public importance to the detriment of the public and the degradation of the editorial prerogative of broadcast journalists.

At the 4–0 vote, Chairman Patrick said: "We seek to extend to the electronic press the same First Amendment guarantees that the print media have enjoyed since our country's inception." Sitting commissioners at the time of the vote were:

- Dennis R. Patrick, chairman, Republican
  (Named an FCC commissioner by Ronald Reagan in 1983)
- Mimi Weyforth Dawson, Republican
  (Named an FCC commissioner by Ronald Reagan in 1986)
- Patricia Diaz Dennis, Democrat
  (Named an FCC commissioner by Ronald Reagan in 1986)
- James Henry Quello, Democrat
  (Named an FCC commissioner by Richard M. Nixon in 1974)

The FCC vote was opposed by members of Congress who said the FCC had tried to "flout the will of Congress" and the decision was "wrongheaded, misguided and illogical". The decision drew political fire, and cooperation with Congress was one issue. In June 1987, Congress attempted to preempt the FCC decision and codify the fairness doctrine, but the legislation was vetoed by President Ronald Reagan. In 1991, another attempt to revive the doctrine was stopped when President George H. W. Bush threatened another veto.

In February 2009, Fowler said that his work toward revoking the fairness doctrine under the Reagan administration had been a matter of principle, his belief that the doctrine impinged upon the First Amendment, not partisanship. Fowler described the White House staff raising concerns, at a time before the prominence of conservative talk radio and during the preeminence of the Big Three television networks and PBS in political discourse, that repealing the policy would be politically unwise. He described the staff's position as saying to Reagan: "The only thing that really protects you from the savageness of the three networks—every day they would savage Ronald Reagan—is the Fairness Doctrine, and Fowler is proposing to repeal it!"

=== Conservative talk radio ===
The 1987 repeal of the fairness doctrine enabled the rise of talk radio that has been described as "unfiltered", divisive and/or vicious: "In 1988, a savvy former ABC Radio executive named Ed McLaughlin signed Rush Limbaugh—then working at a little-known Sacramento station—to a nationwide syndication contract. McLaughlin offered Limbaugh to stations at an unbeatable price: free. All they had to do to carry his program was to set aside four minutes per hour for ads that McLaughlin's company sold to national sponsors. The stations got to sell the remaining commercial time to local advertisers." According to The Washington Post, "From his earliest days on the air, Limbaugh trafficked in conspiracy theories, divisiveness, even viciousness", e.g., "feminazis". Prior to 1987 people using much less controversial verbiage had been taken off the air as obvious violations of the fairness doctrine.

Noting the importance of the repeal in the ascent of Limbaugh and other right-wing media figures, as well as its connection to Ronald Reagan's broader political project, historian Gary Gerstle states: "The repeal of the Fairness Doctrine was a major neoliberal victory. It freed radio and television stations from an obligation to present news that strove for objectivity and balance."

=== Corollary rules ===
Two corollary rules of the doctrine, the personal attack rule and the "political editorial" rule, remained in practice until 2000. The "personal attack" rule applied whenever a person, or small group, was subject to a personal attack during a broadcast. Stations had to notify such persons, or groups, within a week of the attack, send them transcripts of what was said and offer the opportunity to respond on the air. The "political editorial" rule applied when a station broadcast editorials endorsing or opposing candidates for public office, and stipulated that the unendorsed candidates be notified and allowed a reasonable opportunity to respond. The U.S. Court of Appeals for the D.C. Circuit ordered the FCC to justify these corollary rules in light of the decision to repeal the fairness doctrine. The FCC did not provide prompt justification, so both corollary rules were repealed in October 2000.

== Reinstatement considered ==
=== Support ===
In February 2005, U.S. Representative Louise Slaughter (D-NY) and 23 co-sponsors introduced the Fairness and Accountability in Broadcasting Act (H.R. 501) in the 1st session of the 109th Congress of 2005–2007, when Republicans held a majority of both Houses. The bill would have shortened a station's license term from eight years to four, with the requirement that a license-holder cover important issues fairly, hold local public hearings about its coverage twice a year, and document to the FCC how it was meeting its obligations. The bill was referred to committee, but progressed no further. In the same Congress, Representative Maurice Hinchey (D-NY) introduced legislation "to restore the Fairness Doctrine". H.R. 3302, also known as the "Media Ownership Reform Act of 2005" or MORA, had 16 co-sponsors in Congress. In June 2007, Senator Dick Durbin (D-Ill.) said, "It's time to reinstitute the Fairness Doctrine", an opinion shared by his Democratic colleague, Senator John Kerry (D-Mass.). According to Marin Cogan of The New Republic in late 2008:

Senator Durbin's press secretary says that Durbin has "no plans, no language, no nothing. He was asked in a hallway last year, he gave his personal view"—that the American people were served well under the doctrine—"and it's all been blown out of proportion."

On June 24, 2008, U.S. Representative Nancy Pelosi (D-Calif.), the Speaker of the House at the time, told reporters that her fellow Democratic representatives did not want to forbid reintroduction of the fairness doctrine, adding "the interest in my caucus is the reverse". When asked by John Gizzi of Human Events, "Do you personally support revival of the 'Fairness Doctrine?'", the Speaker replied "Yes". On December 15, 2008, U.S. Representative Anna Eshoo (D-Calif.) told The Daily Post in Palo Alto, California that she thought it should also apply to cable and satellite broadcasters, stating: "I'll work on bringing it back. I still believe in it. It should and will affect everyone."

On February 11, 2009, Senator Tom Harkin (D-Iowa) told radio host Bill Press, "we gotta get the Fairness Doctrine back in law again." Later in response to Press's assertion that "they are just shutting down progressive talk from one city after another," Senator Harkin responded, "Exactly, and that's why we need the fair—that's why we need the Fairness Doctrine back." Former President Bill Clinton has also shown support for the fairness doctrine. During a February 13, 2009, appearance on the Mario Solis Marich radio show, Clinton said: "Well, you either ought to have the Fairness Doctrine or we ought to have more balance on the other side, because essentially there's always been a lot of big money to support the right wing talk shows." Clinton cited the "blatant drumbeat" against the stimulus program from conservative talk radio, suggesting that it does not reflect economic reality.

On September 19, 2019, Representative Tulsi Gabbard (D-HI) introduced H.R. 4401 Restore the Fairness Doctrine Act of 2019 in the House of Representatives, 116th Congress. Rep. Gabbard was the only sponsor. H.R. 4401 was immediately referred to the House Committee on Energy and Commerce on the same day. It was then referred to the Subcommittee on Communications and Technology on September 20, 2019. H.R. 4401 would mandate equal media discussion of key political and social topics, requiring television and radio broadcasters to give airtime to opposing sides of issues of civic interest. The summary reads: "Restore the Fairness Doctrine Act of 2019. This bill requires a broadcast radio or television licensee to provide reasonable opportunity for discussion of conflicting views on matters of public importance. The Restore the Fairness Doctrine Act would once again mandate television and radio broadcasters present both sides when discussing political or social issues, reinstituting the rule in place from 1949 to 1987 ... Supporters argue that the doctrine allowed for a more robust public debate and affected positive political change as a result, rather than allowing only the loudest voices or deepest pockets to win."

=== Opposition ===
The fairness doctrine has been strongly opposed by prominent conservatives and libertarians who view it as an attack on First Amendment rights and property rights. Editorials in The Wall Street Journal and The Washington Times in 2005 and 2008 said that Democratic attempts to bring back the fairness doctrine have been made largely in response to conservative talk radio. In 1987, Edward O. Fritts, president of the National Association of Broadcasters, in applauding President Reagan's veto of a bill intended to turn the doctrine into law, said that the doctrine is an infringement on free speech and intrudes on broadcasters' journalistic judgment.

In 2007, Senator Norm Coleman (R-MN) proposed an amendment to a defense appropriations bill that forbade the FCC from "using any funds to adopt a fairness rule." It was blocked, in part on grounds that "the amendment belonged in the Commerce Committee's jurisdiction", Also in 2007, the Broadcaster Freedom Act of 2007 was proposed in the Senate by Senators Coleman with 35 co-sponsors (S.1748) and John Thune (R-SD), with 8 co-sponsors (S.1742), and in the House by Republican Representative Mike Pence (R-IN) with 208 co-sponsors (H.R. 2905). It provided:

The Commission shall not have the authority to prescribe any rule, regulation, policy, doctrine, standard, or other requirement that has the purpose or effect of reinstating or repromulgating (in whole or in part) the requirement that broadcasters present opposing viewpoints on controversial issues of public importance, commonly referred to as the 'Fairness Doctrine', as repealed in General Fairness Doctrine Obligations of Broadcast Licensees, 50 Fed. Reg. 35418 (1985).

Neither of these measures came to the floor of either house. On August 12, 2008, FCC Commissioner Robert M. McDowell stated that the reinstitution of the fairness doctrine could be intertwined with the debate over network neutrality (a proposal to classify network operators as common carriers required to admit all Internet services, applications and devices on equal terms), presenting a potential danger that net neutrality and fairness doctrine advocates could try to expand content controls to the Internet. It could also include "government dictating content policy". The conservative Media Research Center's Culture & Media Institute argued that the three main points supporting the fairness doctrine—media scarcity, liberal viewpoints being censored at a corporate level, and public interest—are all myths. In June 2008, Barack Obama's press secretary wrote that Obama, then a Democratic U.S. senator from Illinois and candidate for president, did not support it, stating:

Obama does not support reimposing the Fairness Doctrine on broadcasters ... [and] considers this debate to be a distraction from the conversation we should be having about opening up the airwaves and modern communications to as many diverse viewpoints as possible. That is why Sen. Obama supports media-ownership caps, network neutrality, public broadcasting, as well as increasing minority ownership of broadcasting and print outlets.

On February 16, 2009, Mark Fowler said:

I believe as President Reagan did, that the electronic press—and you're included in that—the press that uses air and electrons, should be and must be as free from government control as the press that uses paper and ink, Period.

In February 2009, a White House spokesperson said that President Obama continued to oppose the revival of the doctrine. In the 111th Congress, January 2009 to January 2011, the Broadcaster Freedom Act of 2009 (S.34, S.62, H.R.226) was introduced to block reinstatement of the doctrine. On February 26, 2009, by a vote of 87–11, the Senate added that act as an amendment to the District of Columbia House Voting Rights Act of 2009 (S.160), a bill which later passed the Senate 61–37 but not the House of Representatives. The Associated Press reported that the vote on the fairness doctrine rider was "in part a response to conservative radio talk show hosts who feared that Democrats would try to revive the policy to ensure liberal opinions got equal time." The AP report went on to say that President Obama had no intention of reimposing the doctrine, but Republicans, led by Sen. Jim DeMint, R-SC, wanted more in the way of a guarantee that the doctrine would not be reimposed.

=== Suggested alternatives ===
Media reform organizations such as Free Press feel that a return to the fairness doctrine is not as important as setting stronger station ownership caps and stronger "public interest" standards enforcement, with funding from fines given to public broadcasting.

=== Public opinion ===
In an August 2008 telephone poll, released by Rasmussen Reports, 47% of 1,000 likely voters supported a government requirement that broadcasters offer equal amounts of liberal and conservative commentary. 39% opposed such a requirement. In the same poll, 57% opposed and 31% favored requiring Internet websites and bloggers that offer political commentary to present opposing points of view. By a margin of 71–20%, the respondents agreed that it is "possible for just about any political view to be heard in today's media", including the Internet, newspapers, cable TV and satellite radio, but only half the sample said they had followed recent news stories about the fairness doctrine closely. The margin of error was 3%, with a 95% confidence interval.

== Formal revocation ==
In June 2011, the chairman and a subcommittee chairman of the House Energy and Commerce Committee, both Republicans, said that the FCC, in response to their requests, had set a target date of August 2011 for removing the fairness doctrine and other "outdated" regulations from the FCC's rulebook. On August 22, 2011, the FCC voted to remove the rule that implemented the fairness doctrine, along with more than 80 other rules and regulations, from the Federal Register following an executive order by President Obama directing a "government-wide review of regulations already on the books" to eliminate unnecessary regulations.

== See also ==
- Accurate News and Information Act
- False balance
- Free speech
- Mayflower doctrine
- Prior restraint
- Right of reply
- Zapple doctrine
