= Right of reply =

Right to defend against criticism

The right of reply or right of correction generally means the right to defend oneself against public criticism in the same venue where it was published. In some countries, such as Brazil, it is a legal right. In other countries, it is not a legal right as such, but a right which certain media outlets and publications choose to grant to people who have been severely criticised by them, as a matter of editorial policy.

== As a constitutional right ==
=== Brazil ===
The Brazilian Constitution guarantees the right of reply (direito de resposta).

In 2020, a judge ordered the Brazilian government to post a letter from an Indigenous group on official government websites for 30 days. The Waimiri-Atroari felt that the then-president of Brazil, Jair Bolsonaro, was using racist rhetoric against them in a dispute over building a transmission line through the Waimiri-Atroari Indigenous Reserve in the Amazon rainforest, and they exercised their right of reply this way.

== As a legal right ==
=== Europe ===
==== European Union ====
In Europe, there have been proposals for a legally enforceable right of reply that applies to all media, including newspapers, magazines, and other print media, along with radio, television, and the internet. In 1974, the Committee of Ministers of the Council of Europe already voted a resolution granting a right of reply to all individuals. Article 1 of a 2004 Council of Europe recommendation defined a right of reply as: "offering a possibility to react to any information in the media presenting inaccurate facts ... which affect ... personal rights."

==== Individual countries ====
In the federal system of Germany, the individual federal states are responsible for education, cultural affairs, and also the press and electronic media. All press laws of the 16 federal states guarantee the right to a counter presentation of factual statements which are deemed to be wrong by the individuals and organisations concerned. This is based on article 11 the national press law of 1874, and is found in all 16 laws as §11 or §10 in slightly modified versions.

Austria and Switzerland have similar laws on the books. In Austria, this is in article 9 of the national media law, in Switzerland in article 28g of the civil code.

In France, the right to a corrective reply goes back to article 13 of the Law on the freedom of the press of July 29, 1881 and is renewed and extended to broadcast and digital media via various laws and decrees.

The Belgian law on the right to reply emerged in 1831 as article 13 of the 1831 decree on the press. This was replaced 130 years later by the law on the droit de réponse or «loi du 23 juin 1961». Originally referring only to the printed press, this law was amended in 1977 by the law of «4 mars 1977 relative au droit de réponse dans l’audiovisuel» i.e. audiovisual media, published in the Moniteur Belge of March 15, 1977. Since the federalisation of the Belgian state in 1980, the language communities are responsible for the media, and so the Flemish community has passed in 2005 a decrée dated March 4, 2005, which regulates the right to reply in articles 177 to 199, and the German language community has passed the decree of 27 June 2005, which simply refers to the law of 1961 as amended in 1977.

=== United Nations ===
The United Nations recognises the "International Right of Correction" through the "Convention on the International Right of Correction", which entered into force on August 24, 1962.

=== United States ===
The United States has never had a comprehensive national right of reply. However, it did have FCC regulations from 1949 until 2000 on broadcast media creating similar rights, namely the fairness doctrine, the personal attack rule, and the "political editorial" rule. Some states had right to reply laws, but a Florida right of reply law (referring to print media) was overturned as unconstitutional by Miami Herald Publishing Co. v. Tornillo, 418 U.S. 241 (1974). The FCC fairness doctrine (referring to broadcast media) was affirmed as constitutional in Red Lion Broadcasting Co. v. FCC, 395 U.S. 367 (1969), although the FCC decided to discontinue the rule in 1987.

The FCC's personal attack rule and the "political editorial" rule remained in practice until 2000. The "personal attack" rule applied whenever a person, or small group, was subject to a personal attack during a broadcast. Stations had to notify such persons, or groups, within a week of the attack, send them transcripts of what was said and offer the opportunity to respond on-the-air. The "political editorial" rule required that when a station broadcast editorials opposing candidates for public office, the candidate be notified and allowed a reasonable opportunity to respond.

The U.S. Court of Appeals for the D.C. Circuit ordered the FCC to justify these corollary rules in light of the decision to repeal the fairness doctrine. The FCC did not provide prompt justification, so both corollary rules were repealed in October 2000.

== As an editorial policy ==
=== BBC ===
A right of reply can also be part of the editorial policy of a news publication or an academic journal. The BBC's Editorial Guidelines state:

When our output makes allegations of wrongdoing, iniquity or incompetence or lays out a strong and damaging critique of an individual or institution the presumption is that those criticised should be given a "right of reply", that is, given a fair opportunity to respond to the allegations.

=== Australasian Journal of Philosophy ===
The Australasian Journal of Philosophy's editorial policy says:

[A]uthors of the materials being commented on [in Discussion Notes] may be given a right of reply (subject to the usual refereeing), on the understanding that timely publication of the Note will take priority over the desirability of including both Note and Reply in the same issue of the Journal.

=== United States ===
In the U.S., there is a journalistic standard of including denials, exemplified by the ethical code of the Society of Professional Journalists: "Diligently seek subjects of news coverage to allow them to respond to criticism or allegations of wrongdoing."

== See also ==
- Fairness doctrine
- Audi alteram partem
