= Miami Herald Publishing Co. v. Tornillo =

Miami Herald Publishing Co. v. Pat Tornillo
- Supreme Court of the United States

Argued April 17, 1974 Decided June 25, 1974
- Full case name: Miami Herald Publishing Company, Division of Knight Newspapers, Incorporated v. Tornillo
- Citations: 418 U.S. 241 (more) 94 S. Ct. 2831; 41 L. Ed. 2d 730; 1974 U.S. LEXIS 86; 1 Media L. Rep. 1898

Case history
- Prior: Appeal from the Supreme Court of Florida

Holding
- A Florida law requiring newspapers to allow equal access to political candidates in the case of a political editorial or endorsement content is unconstitutional.

Court membership
- Chief Justice Warren E. Burger Associate Justices William O. Douglas · William J. Brennan Jr. Potter Stewart · Byron White; Thurgood Marshall · Harry Blackmun; Lewis F. Powell Jr. · William Rehnquist

Case opinions
- Majority: Burger, joined by unanimous
- Concurrence: Brennan, joined by Rehnquist
- Concurrence: White

Laws applied
- U.S. Const. amend. I

Miami Herald Publishing Co. v. Tornillo, (Note: Pronounced /tɔːrˈnɪloʊ/ tor-NIL-oh.) 418 U.S. 241 (1974), was a seminal First Amendment ruling by the United States Supreme Court. The Supreme Court overturned a Florida state law that required newspapers to offer equal space to political candidates who wished to respond to election-related editorials or endorsements. The Supreme Court ruled that the law was an unconstitutional restriction of freedom of the press under the First Amendment.

== Background ==
In 1972 Pat Tornillo, a candidate for an upcoming election to the Florida House of Representatives, found that the Miami Herald had criticized his candidacy and endorsed his opponent. Tornillo wrote some replies in which he accused the newspaper of defaming his character, and demanded that the newspaper offer him free space in which to print them. Such a request was permissible under a Florida right of reply statute for newspapers (Florida Statute § 104.38).

The newspaper refused Tornillo's demands, so he sued in Florida court for violation of the state's right of reply statute. The Miami Herald responded that the statute was a violation of the First Amendment to the U.S. Constitution, because it compelled newspapers to print content against their will. After several local hearings, the case was sent to the Supreme Court of Florida, which ruled that the Florida statute was not a constitutional violation because, by offering media space to anyone regardless of their financial power or publishing abilities, it enhanced rather than restricted free speech.

The Miami Herald requested a special appeal to the United States Supreme Court, because of questions related to the federal constitution, and the Supreme Court accepted the case per a federal law stating that a state supreme court's ruling on a federal question may not be the final decision in a dispute over constitutional rights.

== Opinion of the court ==
The Supreme Court struck down the Florida right of reply statute for reasons of compelled speech, chilled speech, and the financial nature of the newspaper industry. The court held that the Florida statute violated the First Amendment by requiring newspapers to publish text against their will, while the statute may chill the press because "editors may conclude that the safe course is to avoid controversy."

Furthermore, the Court held that unlike mass media broadcasting, in which a right of reply may be merited due to scarce frequencies, the newspaper industry suffered no such restrictions and a criticized person would have a relatively easier time finding a competing publication, or even starting a new publication of their own. Thus, the Supreme Court overturned the Florida right of reply statute as a violation of freedom of the press, "because of its intrusion into the function of editors" and its restrictions on "the exercise of editorial control and judgment."

== Impact ==
Miami Herald Publishing Co. v. Tornillo has been widely cited as one of the most important Supreme Court rulings on freedom of the press, serving as a crucial precedent in later disputes over government attempts to control the activities of newspapers. However, this ruling is part of an inconsistent duo of cases, with the other being Red Lion Broadcasting Co. v. FCC (1969), in which the Supreme Court upheld different levels of government regulation for print media vs. broadcast media. This has resulted in frequent criticism of the differing free speech protections for different types of mass media simply because of their delivery methods.
