= Red Lion Broadcasting Co. v. FCC =

Red Lion Broadcasting Co. v. Federal Communications Commission
- Supreme Court of the United States

Argued April 2–3, 1969 Decided June 8, 1969
- Full case name: Red Lion Broadcasting Company, Incorporated, et al. v. Federal Communications Commission, et al.
- Citations: 395 U.S. 367 (more) 89 S. Ct. 1794; 23 L. Ed. 2d 371; 1969 U.S. LEXIS 3267; 1 Media L. Rep. 2053
- Argument: Oral argument

Case history
- Prior: 381 F.2d 908 (D.C. Cir. 1967); cert. granted, 389 U.S. 968 (1967); Radio Television News Directors Ass'n v. United States, 400 F.2d 1002 (7th Cir. 1968); cert. granted, consolidated, 393 U.S. 1014 (1969).

Holding
- The First Amendment permits a federal agency to regulate the speech of broadcasters in the interest of maintaining the public interest in equitable use of scarce broadcasting frequencies. Consequently, the Fairness doctrine is constitutional.

Court membership
- Chief Justice Earl Warren Associate Justices Hugo Black · William O. Douglas; John M. Harlan II · William J. Brennan Jr. Potter Stewart · Byron White; Thurgood Marshall

Case opinion
- Majority: White, joined by Warren, Black, Harlan, Brennan, Stewart, Marshall
- Douglas took no part in the consideration or decision of the case.

Laws applied
- U.S. Const. amend. I

Red Lion Broadcasting Co. v. Federal Communications Commission, 395 U.S. 367 (1969), is a seminal First Amendment ruling at the United States Supreme Court. The Supreme Court held that radio broadcasters enjoyed free speech rights under the First Amendment, but those rights could be partially restricted by the Federal Communications Commission (FCC) to maintain the public interest in equitable use of scarce broadcasting frequencies. As a result, the FCC's fairness doctrine was found to be constitutional.

== Background ==
In November 1964, Pennsylvania radio station WGCB, owned by Red Lion Broadcasting, aired a 15-minute broadcast in which Reverend Billy James Hargis criticized author/journalist Fred J. Cook, who had written a book that shed a poor light on Senator Barry Goldwater. Hargis also alleged that Cook was affiliated with Communists. When Cook learned about the broadcast, he demanded free airtime on WGCB to respond to Hargis's personal attacks against him, which was permissible under the fairness doctrine. The station rejected the request, after which Cook filed a complaint with the FCC. Cook received assistance with his legal costs from the Democratic National Committee, which had been using fairness doctrine claims to counteract conservative broadcasting programs.

The FCC ruled that the WGCB broadcast was indeed a personal attack against Cook, and the station was obligated under the Fairness Doctrine to offer free airtime to Cook so he could issue a reply. WGCB again refused to offer time to Cook under the doctrine's equal time and right of reply rules. The FCC then ruled that Red Lion Broadcasting had violated the fairness doctrine, which could result in the loss of their broadcast license.

Red Lion Broadcasting filed suit and claimed that the fairness doctrine was a violation of the First Amendment because it compelled a broadcaster to issue time to, and air commentary from, parties that it may not contract with voluntarily. Red Lion also claimed that the doctrine violated various other rights in the Constitution and several rules about vague and uncertain regulations. The United States Court of Appeals District of Columbia Circuit ruled in favor of the FCC, holding that the fairness doctrine did not violate any parts of the Constitution.

Red Lion Broadcasting appealed the circuit court decision to the United States Supreme Court.

== Opinion of the court ==
The Supreme Court ruled unanimously in favor of the FCC, upholding the fairness doctrine and ruling that it was "the right of the public to receive suitable access to social, political, esthetic, moral, and other ideas and experiences." The court strongly suggested that broadcasters are First Amendment speakers whose editorial speech is protected. Regardless, in upholding the fairness doctrine, the Court based its rationale on challenges created by the scarce radio spectrum, because broadcast media outlets were limited at the time.

Justice Byron White delivered the Opinion of the Court and came to the conclusion that the federal government could place restrictions on broadcasters that could not be placed on ordinary individuals. He stated that "without government control, the medium would be of little use because of the cacophony of competing voices, none of which could be clearly and predictably heard." It was decided that even though broadcasting is a medium that enjoys free speech protections, the specific technical challenges of broadcasting justify differences in the application of the First Amendment.

The Court further explained that the First Amendment does not allow broadcasters who are licensed by the government to use scarce public resources (frequencies) to deny that same resource to others, which would itself be an indirect form of censorship. Meanwhile, even though the fairness doctrine's rules may discourage broadcasters from addressing controversial issues in the first place (a possible chilled speech effect), as had been claimed by Red Lion Broadcasting, the FCC still had the authority to prevent abusive coverage of such issues.

Justice White also held that it is the rights of viewers and listeners that are most important, not the rights of broadcasters. The fairness doctrine required that individuals who were discussed or criticized be given the chance to respond to the statements made by broadcasters, and the Court believed that this helped create a more informed public. Justice White explained that without this doctrine, station owners would only have people on the air who agreed with their own opinions.

== Impact ==
Although Justice William O. Douglas did not participate in the Red Lion ruling, he later stated in Columbia Broadcasting System v. Democratic National Committee that he would have dissented, arguing that the Constitutional right to freedom of the press was absolute, and the government could never compel a radio station to broadcast what it did not wish to.

The Red Lion ruling has been widely cited as one of the most important Supreme Court precedents on the matter of broadcasting and media, because it solidified the public interest in equitable use of then-scarce public broadcast airwaves, which can justify some partial restrictions on the free speech rights of broadcasters by the Federal Communications Commission. However, the ruling is still being used as a precedent in disputes over much later mass media technologies that have made concerns over scarce frequencies largely obsolete. This has inspired some criticism and calls for reappraisal of the precedent.

This ruling is also part of an inconsistent duo of cases, with the other being Miami Herald Publishing Co. v. Tornillo (1974), in which the Supreme Court upheld different levels of government regulation for print media vs. broadcast media. This has resulted in frequent criticism of the differing free speech protections for different types of mass media simply because of their delivery methods.

== See also ==
- United States free speech exceptions
