= WLCH (AM) =

Simulcast of WLCH-FM, Lancaster

Manchester Township, Pennsylvania; United States
- Broadcast area: York, Pennsylvania
- Frequency: 1440 kHz
- Branding: Radio Centro

Programming
- Languages: English; Spanish
- Format: Variety

Ownership
- Owner: Spanish American Civic Association For Equality, Inc.

History
- First air date: December 8, 1950
- Former call signs: WGCB (1950–1997); WTHM (1997–2005); WGLD (2005–2024)

Technical information
- Licensing authority: FCC
- Facility ID: 55352
- Class: D
- Power: 730 watts day; 53 watts night
- Transmitter coordinates: 39°59′58.35″N 76°44′42.88″W
- Translator: 107.1 W296EA (Manchester Township)

Links
- Public license information: Public file; LMS
- Webcast: Listen live
- Website: www.sportsradio1440.com

WLCH (1440 AM, "Radio Centro") is a radio station licensed to serve Manchester Township, Pennsylvania. The station is owned by the Spanish American Civic Association For Equality, Inc.

It broadcasts a variety format in English and Spanish, simulcasting WLCH-FM in Lancaster. The station's programming is also available via its 250-watt translator W296EA (107.1 MHz).

== History ==
WGCB was first licensed on December 8, 1950. It originally was licensed to Red Lion, Pennsylvania. WGCB broadcast a Christian radio format and was owned by Red Lion Broadcasting.

John Harden Norris was the station's first manager.

In 1964, Norris went on a fifteen-minute diatribe against journalist Fred Cook. Cook, under Fairness Doctrine rules, requested a chance to rebut, and Norris refused, claiming the doctrine to be unconstitutional. A lawsuit (Red Lion Broadcasting Co. v. FCC) ensued, which Cook won.

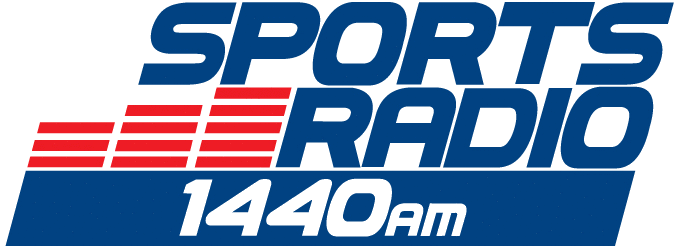
Previous CBS Sports Radio logo

Cumulus Media took control of the station after its purchase of Susquehanna Radio Corporation in 2006. Following the purchase, Cumulus renamed the corporation Radio License Holding SRC, LLC.

Cumulus sold the station to Major Keystone LLC on September 24, 2021.

Previous logo

On January 17, 2022, WGLD changed its format from sports radio to Spanish CHR, branded as "Mega 107.1" and was sold to Victor Martinez's VP Broadcasting, along with its translator, W296EA, and sister station WTKZ.

VP Broadcasting sold WGLD to the Spanish American Civic Association For Equality, owners of WLCH in Lancaster, for $350,000 in 2024. The new owners began programming the station under a local marketing agreement on June 1, and changed the call sign to WLCH on November 24.
