= Comcast Cablevision of Broward County, Inc. v. Broward County, Florida =

United States District Court decision

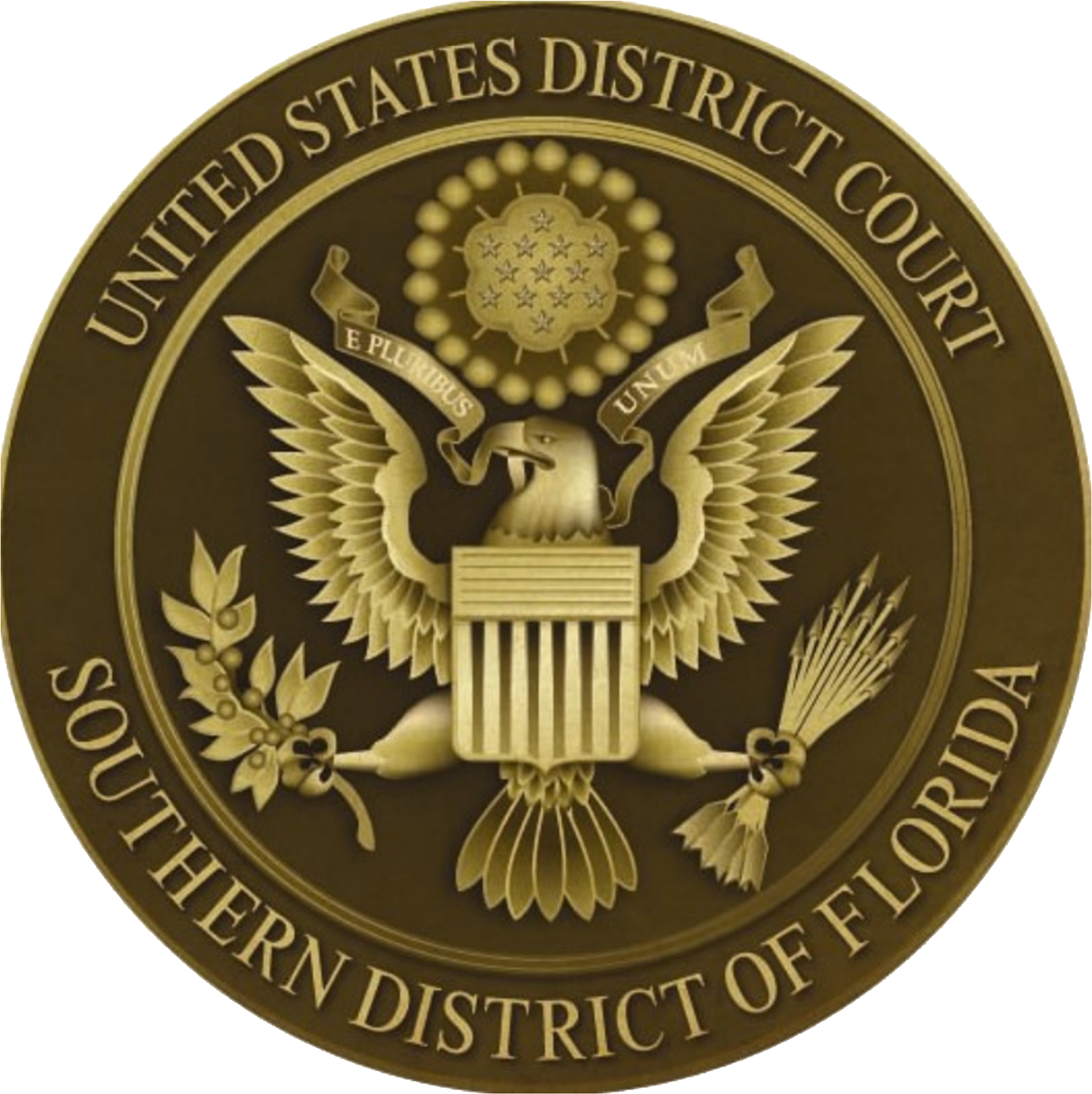
- Court: United States District Court for the Southern District of Florida
- Full case name: Comcast Cablevision of Broward County, Inc. v. Broward County, Florida
- Decided: November 8, 2000
- Citation: 124 F.Supp.2d 685

Holding
- A local ordinance for an Internet service provider to share its physical network with competitors is a violation of freedom of speech and freedom of the press.

Court membership
- Judge sitting: Donald M. Middlebrooks

Laws applied
- First Amendment to the United States Constitution, Telecommunications Act of 1996

Comcast Cablevision of Broward County, Inc. v. Broward County, Florida, 124 F.Supp.2d 685 (S.D. Fla., 2000), was a ruling at the United States District Court for the Southern District of Florida over the constitutionality of a local ordinance requiring an Internet service provider to share its physical network with competitors. The ruling is often cited as an important early precedent on the matter of network neutrality and the free speech rights of Internet service providers.

== Background ==
In 1999, Comcast Cablevision of Broward County (Florida) was that county's monopoly provider of cable broadband Internet service, in control of the physical network infrastructure. At the request of competitor GTE, the county commission adopted Ordinance No.1999-41, requiring non-discriminatory access by potential competitors to the physical network, so they could provide Internet service without building their own physical infrastructures.

The county claimed that the ordinance was "necessary to level the playing field among competitors and guarantee its citizens access to a diversity of Internet service providers, further justifying the ordinance as part of the price for use of the public rights-of-way." Comcast Cablevision contended that the ordinance would require it to carry Internet content on its physical network of which it may not approve, In the company's argument, this was a violation of the First Amendment for reasons of compelled speech and freedom of the press, with the company contending that its content delivery choices were acts of expression and comparing itself to the press because it delivered media content that was financed by the sale of advertising space.

Comcast Cablevision sought judicial review of the county's ordinance, and filed suit at the United States District Court for the Southern District of Florida.

== District court ruling ==
In 1999, the Federal Communications Commission, per a requirement of the Telecommunications Act of 1996, conducted a nationwide study of broadband deployment and found that the marketplace was robust and required no regulatory intervention. Thus, in the Broward County case, Judge Donald M. Middlebrooks of the District Court examined the First Amendment implications of the ordinance rather than its access-related provisions. Since the physical network in question was delivered over cable infrastructure, Middlebrooks looked to the Supreme Court precedent Turner Broadcasting System, Inc. v. FCC, in which it was determined that "regulation of cable operators implicates both the Free Speech and Free Press clauses of the First Amendment."

Comcast Cablevision claimed to be the press because it made programming choices, however indirectly, by choosing to not deliver the Internet content transmitted by its competitors. The company claimed that the county's attempt to require this would violate its free press rights under the First Amendment. Middlebrooks agreed with this argument, basing most of his ruling on the need for a free press and ignoring the fact that Comcast Cablevision maintained physical and financial control of the delivery network, unlike a newspaper. For its part, the county argued that its regulation was economic in nature and focused only on the delivery of network services, and not on the nature of the content. Middlebrooks ruled that distribution is a key component of the free press right, and that if the county required Comcast Cablevision to deliver the content of its competitors, it would be unable to deliver all of its own content.

Thus, the Broward County ordinance was found to be a violation of the First Amendment, and the county was enjoined from enforcing it.

== Impact ==
Comcast Cablevision of Broward County, Inc. v. Broward County, Florida is often cited as an important early precedent on the matter of network neutrality, as any regulation requiring Internet service providers to carry or not carry certain content must be reviewed for its First Amendment implications. However, the ruling has been criticized for ignoring issues of monopoly control and the suppression of competition in local broadband networks, and for misusing the spirit of the First Amendment to maintain corporate profits in the telecommunications industry, which had been a growing trend in that sector for several years before this ruling.
