= Ranchers-Cattlemen Action Legal Fund v. Sonny Perdue =

R-CALF v Sonny Perdue
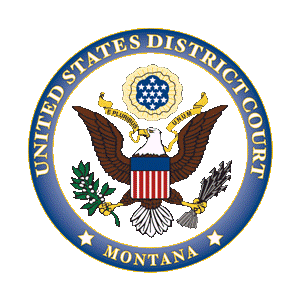
- Court: United States District Court for the District of Montana
- Full case name: Ranchers-Cattlemen Action Legal Fund; United Stockgrowers of Washington v. Sonny Perdue in his official capacity as Secretary of Agriculture and United States Department of Agriculture
- Defendants: Sonny Perdue and United States Department of Agriculture
- Plaintiffs: Ranchers-Cattlemen Action Legal Fund; United Stockgrowers of Washington

Court membership
- Judge sitting: Brian Morris

Ranchers-Cattlemen Action Legal Fund v. Sonny Perdue (No. 4:16-cv-00041-BMM) is a case in which plaintiffs alleged that checkoff dollars were being used to support Canadian and Mexican beef.

Checkoffs are mandatory contributions, from beef producers in this case, which are used for generic industry advertising and research.

This case is distinguished from Ranchers-Cattlemen Action Legal Fund v. USDA (No. 2:17-cv-00223), a challenge to USDA rules that allow Mexican and Canadian beef to be labelled as domestic beef.

== Facts and prior history ==
In 2016 the United States Department of Agriculture rescinded regulations requiring Mexican and Canadian beef be marked as imported. Checkoff advertising does not distinguish between domestic and imported beef. The Plaintiff disagreed with advertising that promotes imported beef to its detriment. It claims compelled speech in violation of the First Amendment. This matter had been addressed by the Supreme Court of the United States in Johanns v. Livestock Marketing Association (2005).

== Developments ==
In June 2017, the court issued a preliminary injunction that stopped the Montana Beef Board from using beef producers' checkoff contributions for advertising, unless the producers approve in advance. The decision hung on the distinction between commercial speech and government speech. Compelled commercial speech is a First Amendment violation. This is in contraposition to Johanns v. Livestock Marketing Association (2005).

In September 2017, the court stayed further proceedings until the Ninth District Court of Appeals rules on the USDA appeal.

- First Amendment Challenge to Beef Checkoff Program Dismissed On March 27, 2020
- Serial Legal Challenges to Federal Beef Checkoff Program Continue on September 11, 2020
- Federal Appeals Court Upholds Dismissal of R-CALF Beef Checkoff Challenge On July 27, 2021

On March 27, 2020, the U.S. District Court for the District of Montana granted summary judgment in favor of the USDA, holding that because of new Memoranda of Understanding (MOUs) giving the USDA pre-approval authority over promotional content, the Qualified State Beef Council speech constituted government speech and thus did not violate the First Amendment.

On September 11, 2020, R-CALF appealed the ruling to the Ninth Circuit Court of Appeals, arguing that the MOUs did not cure the constitutional concerns.

On July 27, 2021, the Ninth Circuit upheld the District Court’s decision, concluding that the speech was government speech due to federal oversight and control mechanisms.
