= Wooley v. Maynard =

- Supreme Court of the United States

Argued November 29, 1976 Decided April 20, 1977
- Full case name: Neal R. Wooley v. George Maynard
- Citations: 430 U.S. 705 (more) 97 S. Ct. 1428; 51 L. Ed. 2d 752; 1977 U.S. LEXIS 75
- Argument: Oral argument

Case history
- Prior: Maynard v. Wooley, 406 F. Supp. 1381 (D.N.H. 1976), probable jurisdiction noted, 426 U.S. 946 (1976).

Holding
- New Hampshire could not constitutionally require citizens to display a state motto that went against an individual's morality upon their vehicle license plates.

Court membership
- Chief Justice Warren E. Burger Associate Justices William J. Brennan Jr. · Potter Stewart; Byron White · Thurgood Marshall; Harry Blackmun · Lewis F. Powell Jr. William Rehnquist · John P. Stevens

Case opinions
- Majority: Burger, joined by Brennan, Stewart, Marshall, Powell, Stevens; White (in part)
- Dissent: White (in part), joined by Blackmun, Rehnquist (in part)
- Dissent: Rehnquist, joined by Blackmun

Laws applied
- U.S. Const. amend. I

Wooley v. Maynard, 430 U.S. 705 (1977), was a case in which the Supreme Court of the United States held that New Hampshire could not constitutionally require citizens to display the state motto upon their license plates when the state motto was offensive to their moral convictions.

This case has been praised by legal scholars as a check against compelled speech by the government and a strong protection of symbolic speech in the form of covering up government speech on private property.

== Background ==
Since 1970 New Hampshire had required that noncommercial vehicles bear license plates embossed with the state motto, "Live Free or Die". Another New Hampshire statute made it a misdemeanor "knowingly [to obscure] ... the figures or letters on any number plate". The term "letters" in this section had been interpreted by the State's highest court in State v. Hoskin, 112 N.H. 332 (1972) to include the state motto.

== Facts of the case ==
George Maynard and his wife, followers of the Jehovah's Witnesses faith (albeit disfellowshipped), viewed the motto as repugnant to their moral, religious, and political beliefs, and for this reason, they covered up the motto on the license plates of their jointly owned family automobiles. On November 27, 1974, Maynard was issued a citation for violating the state statutes regarding obscuring of the state motto.

== Prior history ==
On December 6, 1974, Maynard appeared pro se in Lebanon District Court to answer the charge. After waiving his right to counsel, he entered a plea of not guilty and proceeded to explain his religious objections to the motto. "[B]y religious training and belief, I believe my 'government – Jehovah's Kingdom – offers everlasting life. It would be contrary to that belief to give up my life for the state, even if it meant living in bondage. ... [T]his slogan is directly at odds with my deeply held religious convictions ... I also disagree with the motto on political grounds. I believe that life is more precious than freedom." The state trial judge expressed sympathy for Maynard's situation, but considered himself bound by the authority of State v. Hoskin, 112 N.H. 332 (1972), to hold Maynard guilty. The court imposed a $25 fine, but suspended it during "good behavior".

On December 28, 1974, Maynard was again charged with violating 262:27-c. He appeared in court on January 31, 1975, and again chose to represent himself; he was found guilty, fined $50, and sentenced to six months in the Grafton County House of Corrections. The court suspended this jail sentence but ordered Maynard to also pay the $25 fine for the first offense. Maynard informed the court that, as a matter of conscience, he refused to pay the two fines. The court thereupon sentenced him to jail for a period of 15 days. He served the full sentence.

Prior to trial on the second offense Maynard was charged with yet a third violation of 262:27-c on January 3, 1975. He appeared on this complaint on the same day as for the second offense, and was, again, found guilty. This conviction was "continued for sentence" so that Maynard received no punishment in addition to the 15 days.

On March 4, 1975, the Maynards sued in the United States District Court for the District of New Hampshire, seeking injunctive and declaratory relief against enforcement of N. H. Rev. Stat. Ann. 262:27-c, 263:1, insofar as these required displaying the state motto on their vehicle license plates, and made it a criminal offense to obscure the motto. On March 11, 1975, the District Court issued a temporary restraining order against further arrests and prosecutions of the Maynards. Because the appellees sought an injunction against a state statute on grounds of its unconstitutionality, a three-judge District Court was convened pursuant to 28 U.S.C. 2281. Following a hearing on the merits, the District Court entered an order enjoining the State "from arresting and prosecuting [the Maynards] at any time in the future for covering over that portion of their license plates that contains the motto 'Live Free or Die'".

The Governor of New Hampshire chose to appeal to the United States Supreme Court, and it accepted the case.

== Decision of the court ==
In a 6–3 decision, the Court held that New Hampshire could not constitutionally require citizens to display the state motto upon their vehicle license plates. Chief Justice Burger, writing for the Court, found that the statute in question effectively required individuals to "use their private property as a 'mobile billboard' for the State's ideological message". The Court held that the State's interests in requiring the motto did not outweigh free speech principles under the First Amendment, including "the right of individuals to hold a point of view different from the majority and to refuse to foster ... an idea they find morally objectionable". The state's interest in motor vehicle identification could be achieved by "less drastic means", and its interest in fostering state pride was not viewpoint-neutral.

=== Dissents ===
Justice Rehnquist wrote a dissenting opinion in which Justice Blackmun joined. Rehnquist wrote that

For First Amendment principles to be implicated, the State must place the citizen in the position of either apparently or actually "asserting as true" the message. This was the focus of Barnette [West Virginia State Board of Education v. Barnette, 319 U.S. 624 (1943)], and clearly distinguishes this case from that one.

In holding that the New Hampshire statute does not run afoul of our holding in Barnette, the New Hampshire Supreme Court ... aptly articulated why there is no required affirmation of belief in this case:

The defendants' membership in a class of persons required to display plates bearing the State motto carries no implication and is subject to no requirement that they endorse that motto or profess to adopt it as matter of belief.

As found by the New Hampshire Supreme Court in Hoskin, there is nothing in state law which precludes appellees from displaying their disagreement with the state motto as long as the methods used do not obscure the license plates. Thus appellees could place on their bumper a conspicuous bumper sticker explaining in no uncertain terms that they do not profess the motto "Live Free or Die" and that they violently disagree with the connotations of that motto. Since any implication that they affirm the motto can be so easily displaced, I cannot agree that the state statutory system for motor vehicle identification and tourist promotion may be invalidated under the fiction that appellees are unconstitutionally forced to affirm, or profess belief in, the state motto.

== See also ==
- Summers v. Adams: Circuit Court case involving South Carolina license plates
- Walker v. Texas Division, Sons of Confederate Veterans: Supreme Court case involving Texas license plates
- List of United States Supreme Court cases, volume 430
- Compelled speech
- List of Supreme Court cases involving Jehovah's Witnesses
