= Agriculture in the United States =

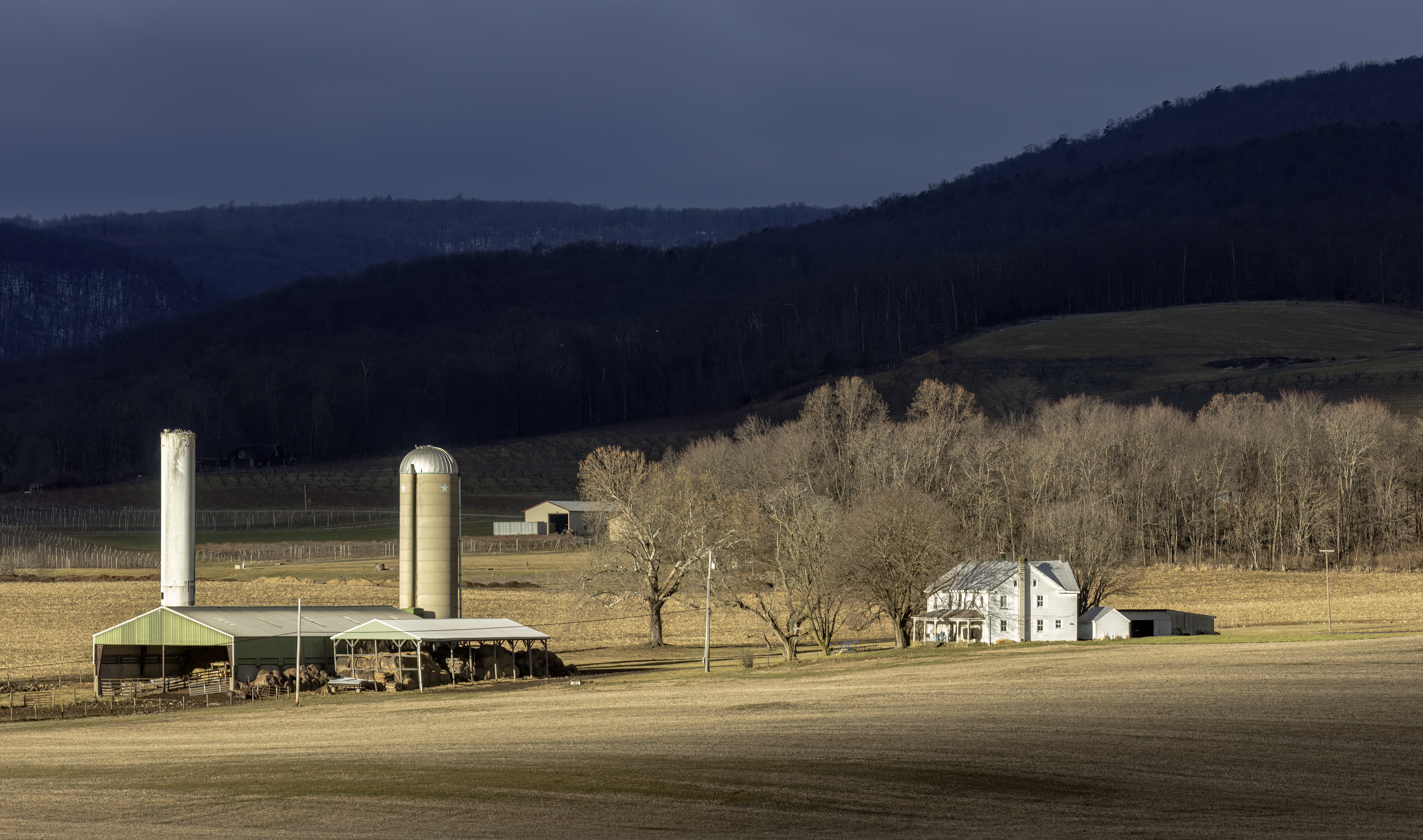
A farm at the base of Catoctin Mountain between Thurmont and Emmitsburg, Maryland.

Agriculture is a major industry in the United States, which is a net exporter of food. As of the 2022 census of agriculture, there were 1.9 million farms (down 6.9% from 2017), covering an area of 880.1 million acres, an average of 463 acres per farm.

Agricultural activity is particularly concentrated in the Central Valley of California and the Great Plains. The Great Plains are a vast expanse of flat arable land in the center of the nation covering an area west of the Great Lakes and east of the Rocky Mountains. The eastern wetter half is a major corn- and soybean-producing region known as the Corn Belt, and the western drier half is known as the Wheat Belt because of its high rate of wheat production. The Central Valley of California produces fruits, vegetables, and nuts. The American South has historically been a large producer of cotton, tobacco, and rice, but it has declined in agricultural production over the past century. California leads the nation in citrus production and is the number two producer of oranges in the world behind only Brazil.

The U.S. has led developments in seed improvement, such as hybridization, and in expanding uses for crops from the work of George Washington Carver to bioplastics and biofuels. The mechanization of farming and intensive farming have been major themes in U.S. history, including John Deere's steel plow, Cyrus McCormick's mechanical reaper, Eli Whitney's cotton gin, and the widespread success of the Fordson tractor and the combine harvester. Modern agriculture in the U.S. ranges from hobby farms and small-scale producers to large commercial farms that cover thousands of acres of cropland or rangeland.

== History ==
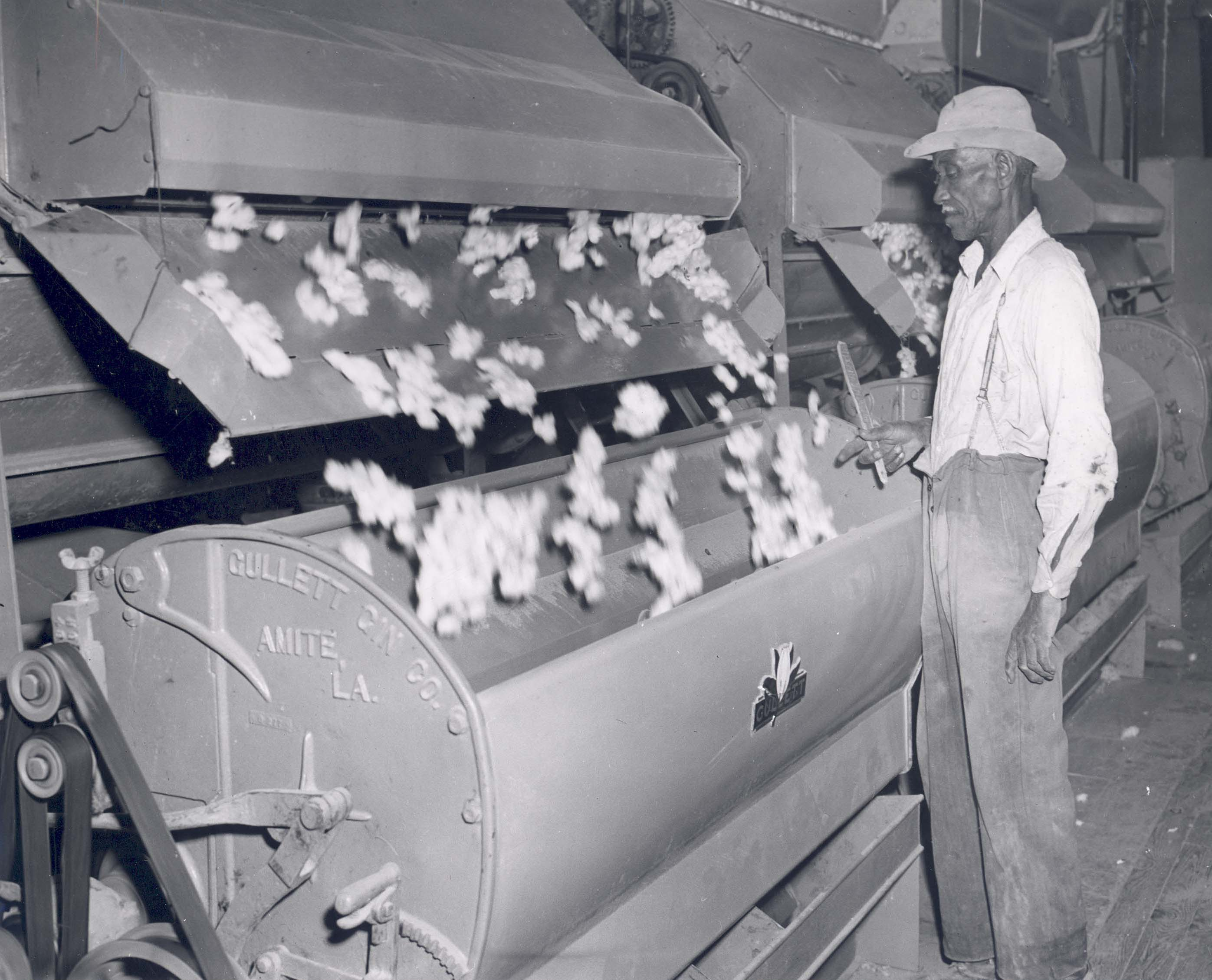
Worker overseeing cotton gin, ca. 1940s

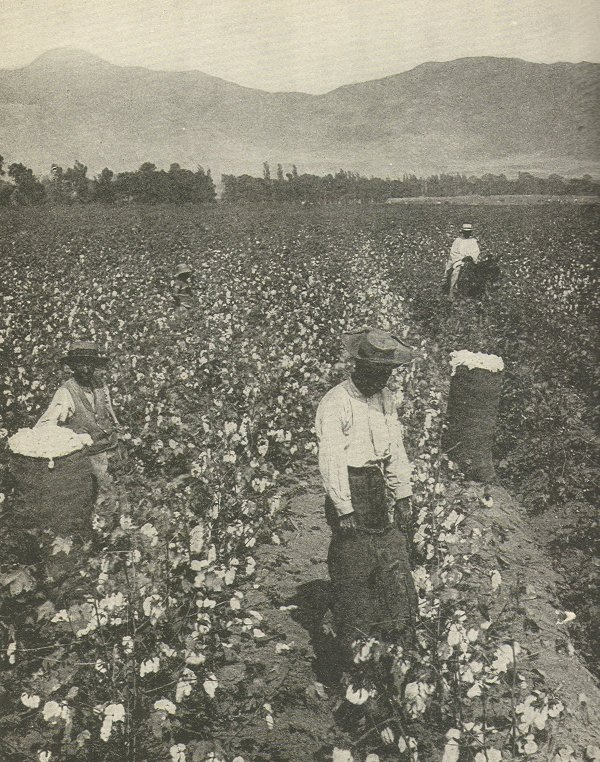
Cotton farming on a Southern plantation in 1921

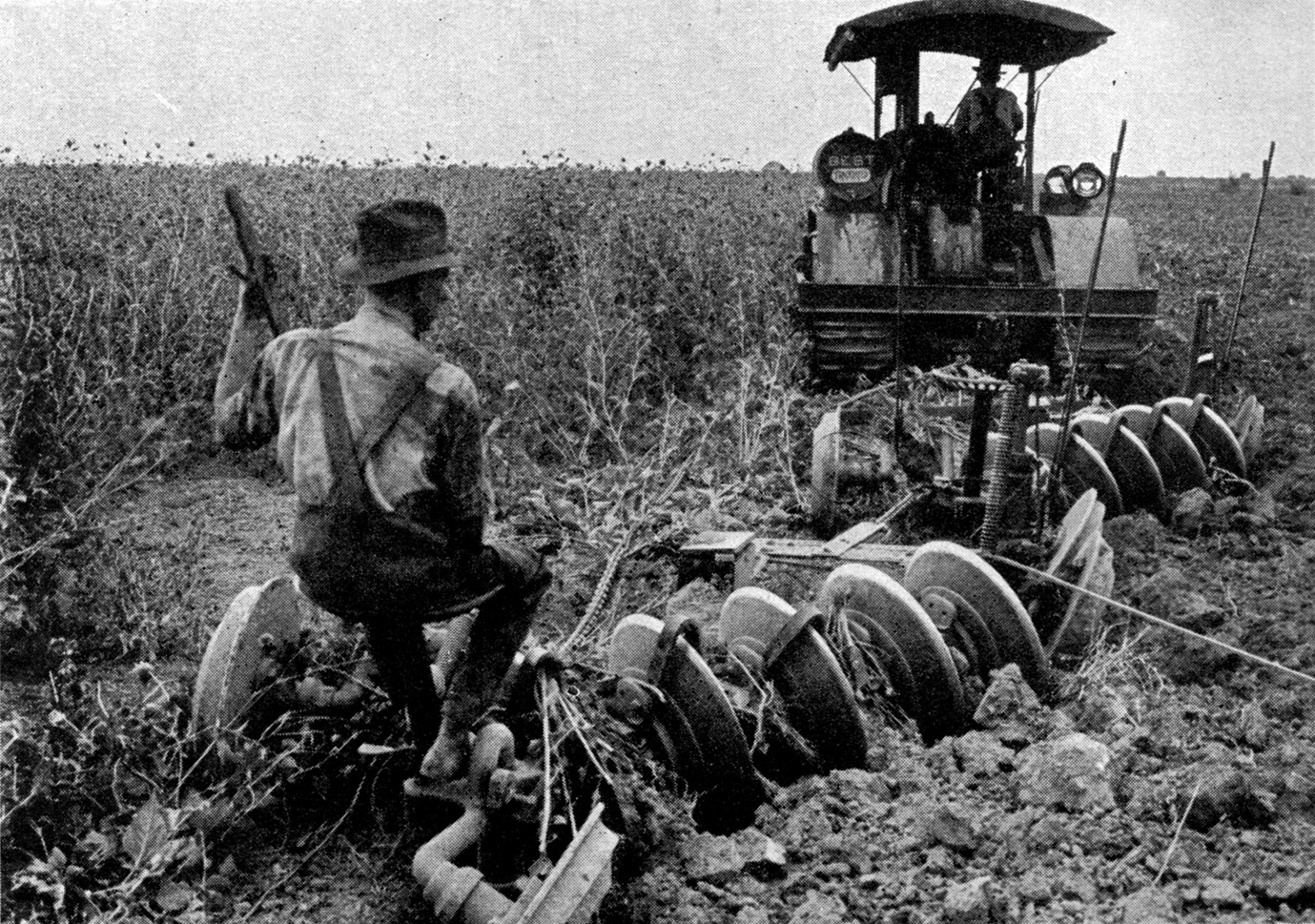
This photo from a 1921 encyclopedia shows a tractor plowing a crop field.

Corn, turkeys, tomatoes, potatoes, peanuts, and sunflower seeds constitute some of the major holdovers from the agricultural endowment of the Americas.

Colonists had more access to land in the colonial United States than they did in Europe. The organization of labor was complex, including free persons, slaves and indentured servants depending on the regions where either slaves or poor landless laborers were available to work on family farms.

European agricultural practices greatly affected the New England landscape. Colonists brought livestock over from Europe which caused many changes to the land. Grazing animals required a lot of land and food and the act of grazing itself destroyed native grasses, which were being replaced by European species. New species of weeds were introduced and began to thrive as they were capable of withstanding the grazing of animals, whereas native species could not.

The practices associated with keeping livestock also contributed to the deterioration of the forests and fields. Colonists would cut down the trees and then allow their cattle and livestock to graze freely in the forest and never plant more trees. The animals trampled and tore up the ground so much as to cause long-term destruction and damage.

Soil exhaustion was a major problem in New England agriculture. While farming with oxen allowed colonists to farm more land, it increased erosion and decreased soil fertility. This was due to deeper plow cuts in the soil that allowed the soil more contact with oxygen causing nutrient depletion. In grazing fields in New England, the soil was being compacted by the large number of cattle and this did not give the soil enough oxygen to sustain life.

In the United States, farms spread from the colonies westward along with the settlers. In cooler regions, wheat was often the crop of choice when lands were newly settled, leading to a "wheat frontier" that moved westward over the course of years. Also very common in the antebellum Midwest was farming corn while raising hogs, complementing each other especially since it was difficult to get grain to market before the canals and railroads. After the "wheat frontier" had passed through an area, more diversified farms including dairy cattle generally took its place. Warmer regions saw plantings of cotton and herds of beef cattle. In the early colonial South, raising tobacco and cotton was common, especially through the use of slave labor until the Civil War. With an established source for labor, and the development of the cotton gin in 1793, the South was able to maintain an economy based on the production of cotton. By the late 1850s, the South produced 100% of the 374 million pounds of cotton used in the United States. The rapid growth in cotton production was possible because of the availability of slaves. In the northeast, slaves were used in agriculture until the early 19th century. In the Midwest, slavery was prohibited by the Freedom Ordinance of 1787.

2015 US$ value of agricultural output of the US since 1961

The introduction and broad adoption of scientific agriculture since the mid-19th century contributed to economic growth in the United States. This development was facilitated by the Morrill Act and the Hatch Act of 1887 which established in each state a land-grant university (with a mission to teach and study agriculture) and a federally funded system of agricultural experiment stations and cooperative extension networks which place extension agents in each state.

Soybeans were not widely cultivated in the United States until the early 1930s, and by 1942 it became the world's largest soybean producer, due in part to World War II and the "need for domestic sources of fats, oils, and meal". Between 1930 and 1942, the United States' share of world soybean production grew from 3% to 47%, and by 1969 it had risen to 76%. By 1973, soybeans were the United States' "number one cash crop, and leading export commodity, ahead of both wheat and corn". Although soybeans developed as the top cash crop, corn also remains as an important commodity. As the basis for "industrial food," corn is found in most modern day items at the grocery store. Aside from items like candy and soda, which contain high-fructose corn syrup, corn is also found in non-edible items like the shining wax on store advertisements.

Significant areas of farmland were abandoned during the Great Depression and incorporated into nascent national forests. Later, "Sodbuster" and "Swampbuster" restrictions written into federal farm programs starting in the 1970s reversed a decades-long trend of habitat destruction that began in 1942 when farmers were encouraged to plant all possible land in support of the war effort. In the United States, federal programs administered through local Soil and Water Conservation Districts provide technical assistance and partial funding to farmers who wish to implement management practices to conserve soil and limit erosion and floods.

Farmers in the early United States were open to planting new crops, raising new animals and adopting new innovations as increased agricultural productivity in turn increased the demand for shipping services, containers, credit, storage, and the like.

Although four million farms disappeared in the United States between 1948 and 2015, the total output from the farms that remained more than doubled. The number of farms with more than 2,000 acres (810 ha) almost doubled between 1987 and 2012, while the number of farms with 200 acres (81 ha) to 999 acres (404 ha) fell over the same period by 44%.

Farm productivity increased in the United States from the mid-20th century until the late-20th century when productivity began to stall.

From 1986 to 2018 about 30 million acres of cropland were abandoned.

== Production ==
Agricultural rankings as of 2018
Crop	Ranking	Output (000 tons)	Notes
Corn	1 by far	392,000	
Soy	2	123,600	surpassed by Brazil in 2020
Wheat	4	51,200	behind China, India, and Russia
Sugar beets	3	30,000	behind Russia, and France
Sugar cane	10	31,300	
Potatoes	5	20,600	behind China, India, Russia, and Ukraine
Tomatoes	3	12,600	behind China and India
Cotton	3	11,400	behind China and India
Rice	12	10,100	
Sorghum	1	9,200	
Grapes	3	6,800	behind China and Italy
Oranges	4	4,800	behind Brazil, China, and India
Apples	2	4,600	behind China
Lettuce and Chicory	2	3,600	behind China
Barley		3,300	
Onions	3	3,200	behind China and India
Peanuts	3	2,400	behind China and India
Almonds	1	1,800	
Beans		1,700	
Watermelons		1,700	
Rapeseed		1,600	
Carrots	3	1,500	behind China and Uzbekistan
Strawberries	2	1,300	behind China
Cauliflower and Broccoli	3	1,200	behind China and India
Sunflower seeds		960	
Oats	10	814	
Lemons	8	812	
Tangerines		804	
Pears	3	730	behind China and Italy
Green peas	3	722	behind China and India
Peaches	6	700	
Walnuts	2	613	behind China
Pistachios	2	447	behind Iran
Lentils	3	381	behind Canada and India
Spinach	2	384	behind China
Plums	4	368	behind China, Romania, and Serbia
Tobacco	4	241	behind China, Brazil, and India

In addition to smaller productions of other agricultural products, such as melon (872), pumpkin (683), grapefruit (558), cranberry (404), cherry (312), blueberry (255), rye (214), olive (138), and others.

== Major agricultural products ==
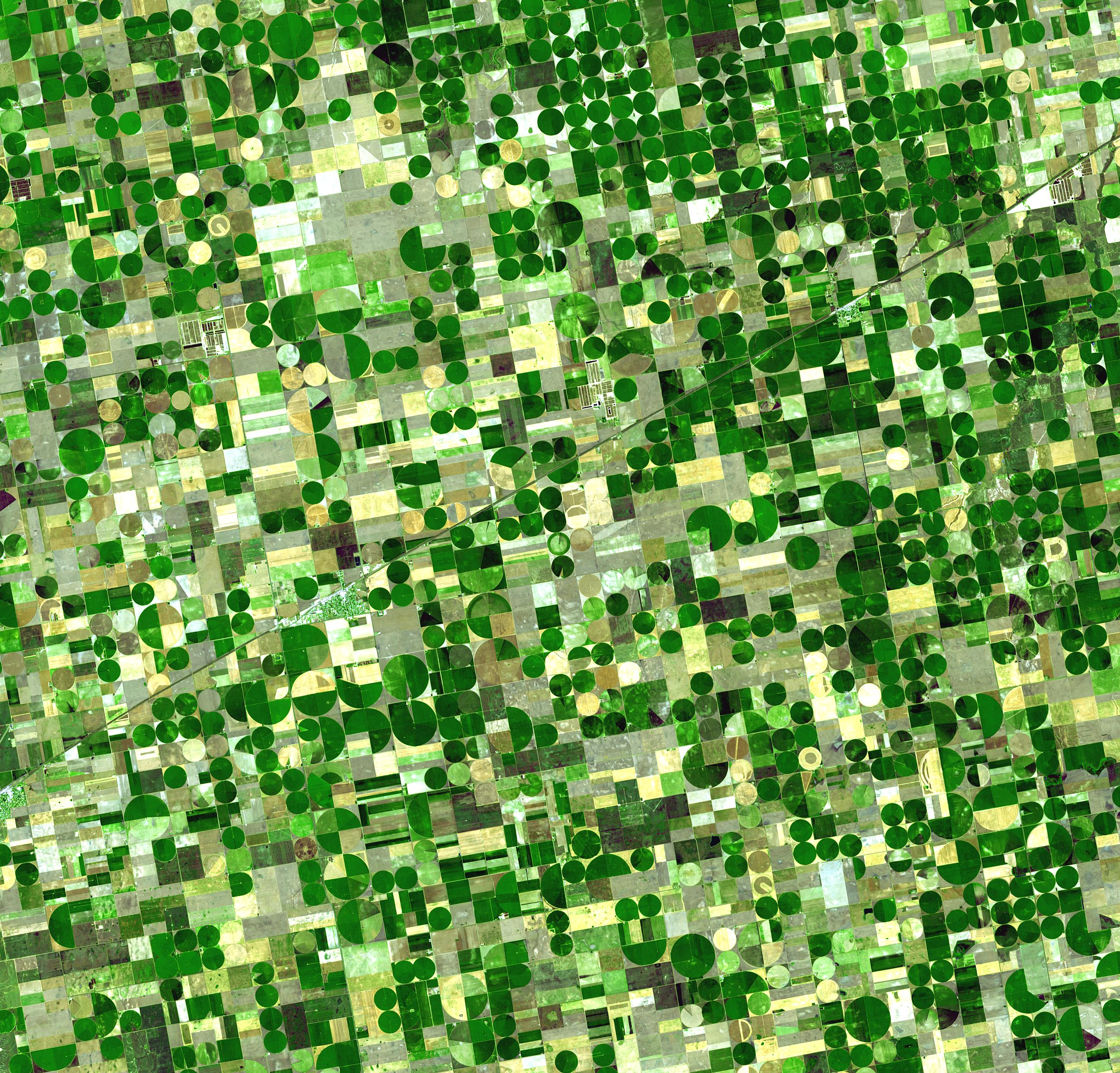
Satellite image of circular crop fields characteristic of center pivot irrigation in Kansas (June 2001).

Tonnes of United States agricultural production, as reported by the Food and Agriculture Organization (FAO) of the U.N. in 2003 and 2013 (ranked roughly in order of value):

Millions of Tonnes in	2003	2013
Corn	256.0	354.0
Cattle meat	12.0	11.7
Cow's milk, whole, fresh	77.0	91.0
Chicken meat	14.7	17.4
Soybeans	67.0	89.0
Pig meat	9.1	10.5
Wheat	64.0	58.0
Cotton lint	4.0	2.8
Hen eggs	5.2	5.6
Turkey meat	2.5	2.6
Tomatoes	11.4	12.6
Potatoes	20.8	19.8
Grapes	5.9	7.7
Oranges	10.4	7.6
Rice, paddy	9.1	8.6
Apples	3.9	4.1
Sorghum	10.4	9.9
Lettuce	4.7	3.6
Cottonseed	6.0	5.6
Sugar beets	30.7	29.8

Other crops appearing in the top 20 at some point in the last 40 years were: tobacco, barley, and oats, and, rarely: peanuts, almonds, and sunflower seeds. Alfalfa and hay would both be in the top ten in 2003 if they were tracked by FAO.

=== Crops ===
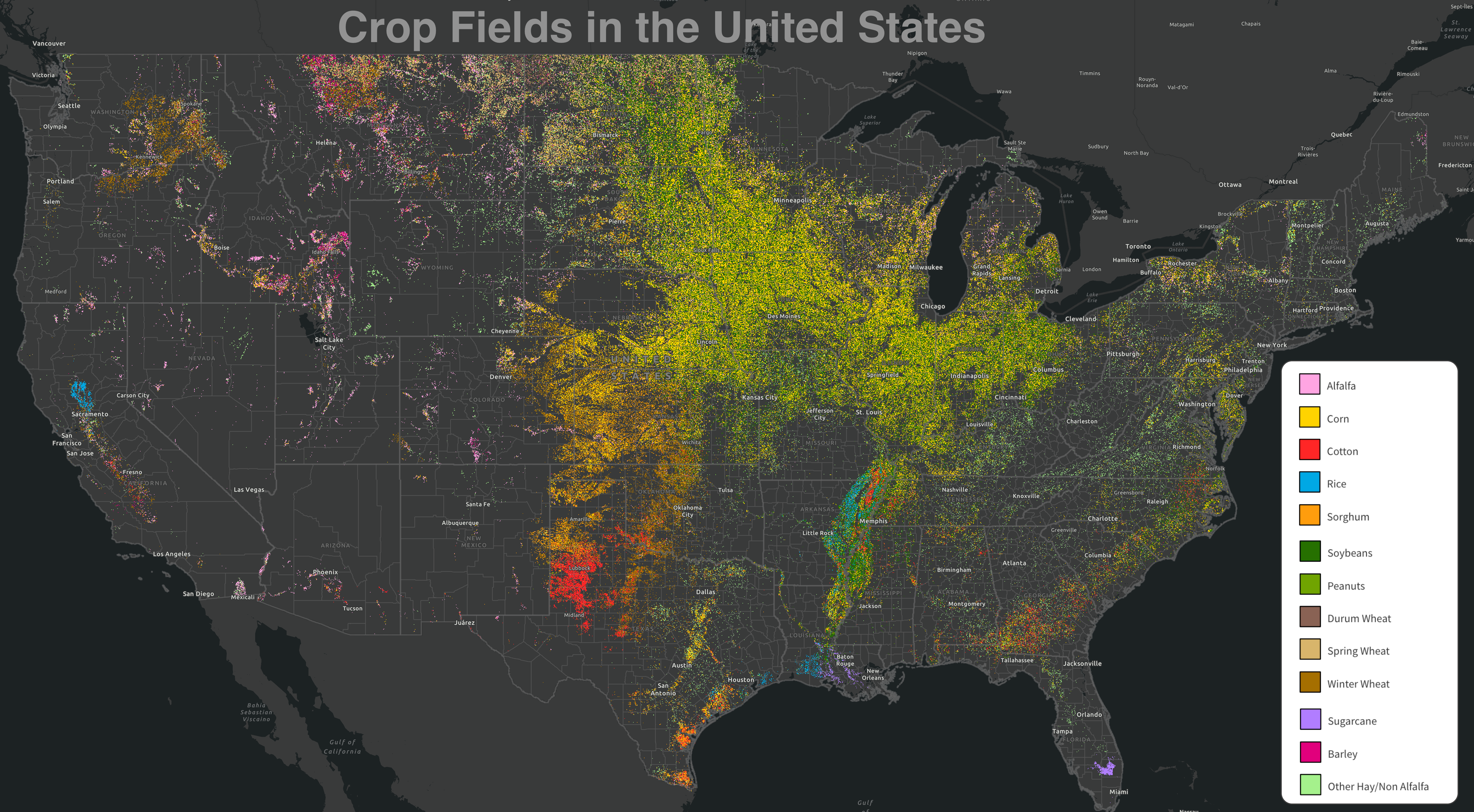
Crop fields in the United States

==== Value of production ====
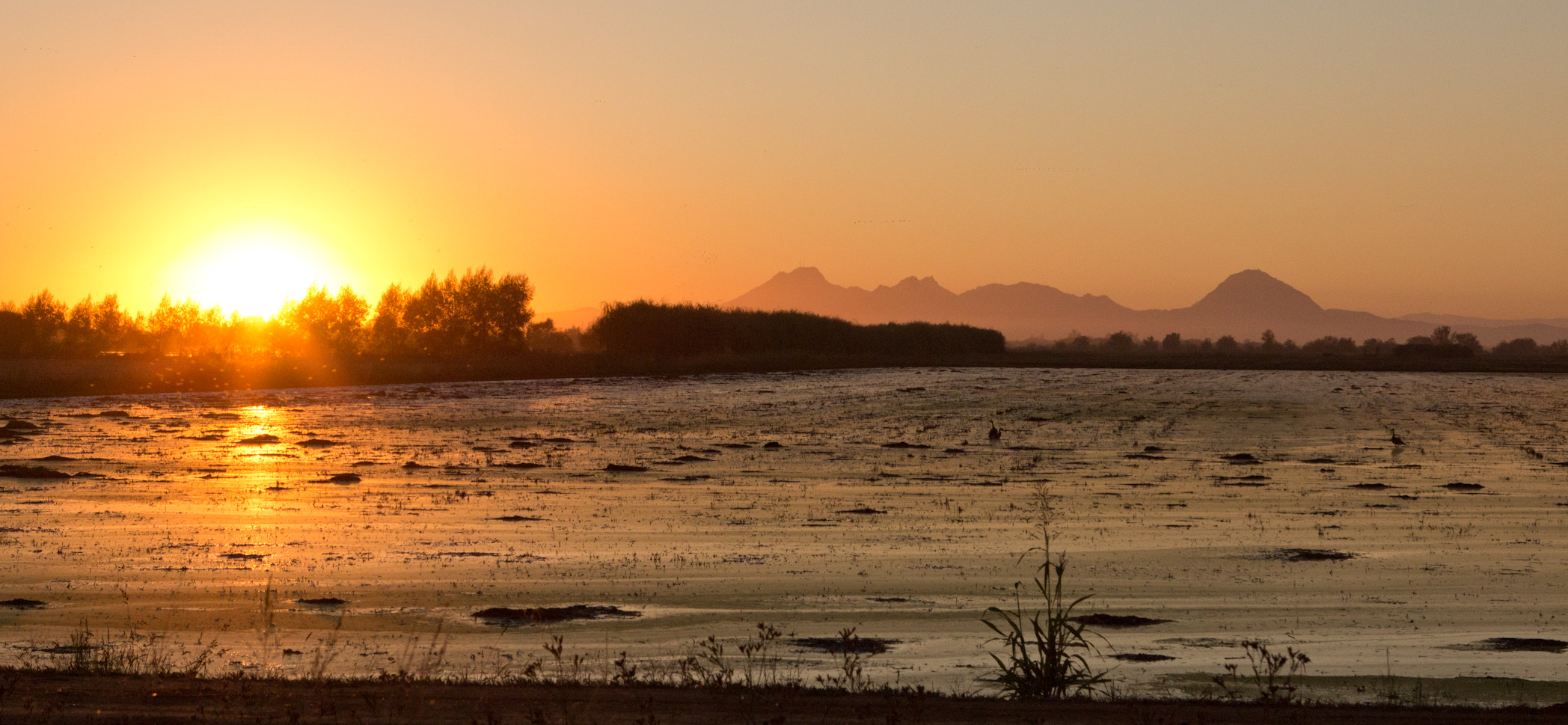
Rice paddy, California

Major Crops in the U.S.	1997 (in US$ billions)	2014 (in US$ billions)
Corn	$24.4	$52.3
Soybeans	$17.7	$40.3
Wheat	$8.6	$11.9
Alfalfa	$8.3	$10.8
Cotton	$6.1	$5.1
Hay, (non-Alfalfa)	$5.1	$8.4
Tobacco	$3.0	$1.8
Rice	$1.7	$3.1
Sorghum	$1.4	$1.7
Barley	$0.9	$0.9
Source	1997 USDA – NASS reports,	2015 USDA-NASS reports,

Note: alfalfa and hay are not tracked by the FAO, and the production of tobacco in the United States has fallen by 60% between 1997 and 2003.

==== Yield ====
Heavily mechanized, U.S. agriculture has a high yield relative to other countries. As of 2004:

- Corn for grain, average of 160.4 bushels harvested per acre (10.07 t/ha)
- Soybean for beans, average of 42.5 bushels harvested per acre (2.86 t/ha)
- Wheat, average of 43.2 bushels harvested per acre (2.91 t/ha, was 44.2 bu/ac or 2.97 t/ha in 2003)

=== Livestock ===
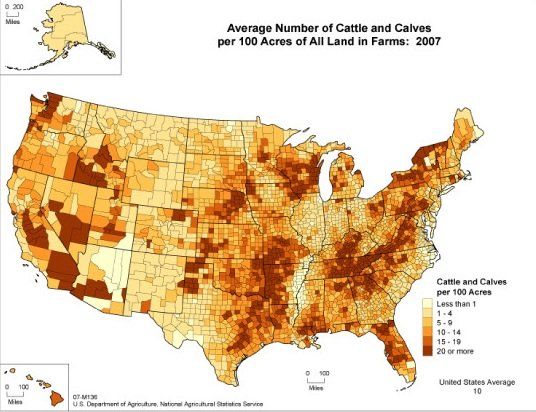
Density of cattle and calves by county in 2007.

The major livestock industries in the United States:

- Dairy cattle
- Beef cattle
- Pig
- Poultry
- Seafood
- Sheep

U.S. livestock and poultry inventory
Type	1997	2002	2007	2012
Cattle and calves	99,907,017	95,497,994	96,347,858	89,994,614
Hogs and pigs	61,188,149	60,405,103	67,786,318	66,026,785
Sheep and lambs	8,083,457	6,341,799	5,819,162	5,364,844
Broilers & other meat chickens	1,214,446,356	1,389,279,047	1,602,574,592	1,506,276,846
Laying hens	314,144,304	334,435,155	349,772,558	350,715,978

Goats, horses, turkeys and bees are also raised, though in lesser quantities. Inventory data is not as readily available as for the major industries. For the three major goat-producing states—Arizona, New Mexico, and Texas—there were 1.2 million goats at the end of 2002. There were 5.3 million horses in the United States at the end of 1998. There were 2.5 million colonies of bees at the end of 2005.

== Farm type or majority enterprise type ==
Farm type is based on which commodities are the majority crops grown on a farm. Nine common types include:

- Cash grains include corn, soybeans and other grains (wheat, oats, barley, sorghum), dry edible beans, peas, and rice.
- Tobacco
- Cotton
- Other field crops include peanuts, potatoes, sunflowers, sweet potatoes, sugarcane, broomcorn, popcorn, sugar beets, mint, hops, seed crops, hay, silage, forage, etc. Tobacco and cotton can be included here if not in their own separate category.
- High-value crops include fruits, vegetables, melons, tree nuts, greenhouse, nursery crops, and horticultural specialties.
- Cattle
- Hogs
- Dairy
- Poultry and eggs

One characteristic of the agricultural industry that sets it apart from others is the number of individuals who are self-employed. Frequently, farmers and ranchers are both the principal operator, the individual responsible for successful management and day-to-day decisions, and the primary laborer for his or her operation. For agricultural workers who sustain an injury, the resultant loss of work has implications on physical health and financial stability.

The United States has over 14,000 certified organic farms, covering more than 5 million acres, though this is less than 1% of total US farmland. The output of these farms has grown substantially since 2011, and exceeded US$7.5 billion in 2016.

== Governance ==
Agriculture subsidy, from a Congressional Budget Office report. Note: chart does not show sugar subsidies.

Agriculture in the United States is primarily governed by periodically renewed U.S. farm bills. Governance is both a federal and a local responsibility, with the United States Department of Agriculture serving as the federal department responsible. Government aid includes research into crop types and regional suitability as well as many kinds of federal government subsidies, price supports and loan programs. U.S. farmers are not subject to production quotas and some laws are different for farms compared to other workplaces.

Labor laws prohibiting children in other workplaces provide some exemptions for children working on farms with complete exemptions for children working on their family's farm. Children can also gain permits from vocational training schools or 4-H clubs which allow them to do jobs they would otherwise not be permitted to do.

A large part of the U.S. farm workforce is made up of migrant and seasonal workers, many of them recent immigrants from Latin America. Additional laws apply to these workers and their housing which is often provided by the farmer.

== Farm labor ==
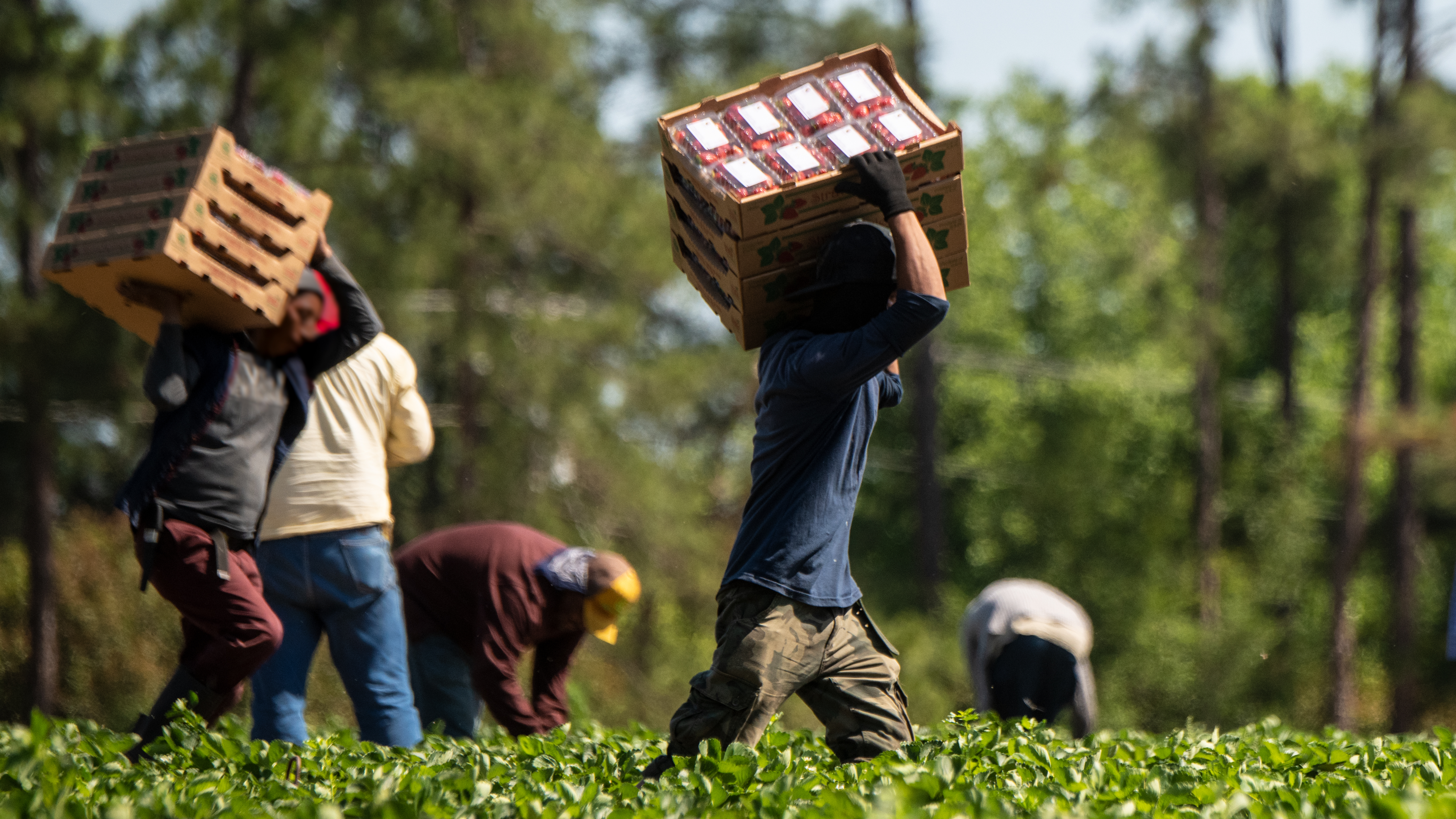
Farmworkers in Fort Valley, Georgia in 2019

Farmworkers in the United States have unique demographics, wages, working conditions, organizing, and environmental aspects. According to the National Institute for Occupational Safety and Health, approximately 2,112,626 full-time workers were employed in production agriculture in the U.S. in 2019 and approximately 1.4 to 2.1 million hired crop workers are employed annually on crop farms in the U.S. In 2025, the Department of Agriculture found the average age among farmworkers to be 39.6 years old, the average wage to be $17.23 per hour, and the average number of hours worked to be 40.8 per week.

The types of farmworkers include field crop workers, nursery workers, greenhouse workers, supervisors, etc. The Department of Labor findings for the years 2019–2020 report that 63% of crop workers were born in Mexico, 30% in the mainland United States or Puerto Rico, 5% in Central America, and 2 percent in other regions. The amount of farm labor in the United States has changed substantially: in 1870, almost 50 percent of the U.S. population was employed in agriculture; as of 2025, less than 1% of the population was directly employed in agriculture.

Potential health and safety issues that may be associated with farm work include vehicle rollovers, falls, musculoskeletal injuries, hazardous equipment, grain bins, pesticides, unsanitary conditions, and respiratory disease. According to the United States Department Of Labor, farmworkers are at risk of work-related lung diseases, noise-induced hearing loss, skin diseases, and certain cancers related to chemical use. Farm workers also suffer disproportionately from heat stress, with fewer than average seeking treatment. While some progress has been made, many farmworkers continue to struggle for fair pay, proper training, and safe working conditions.

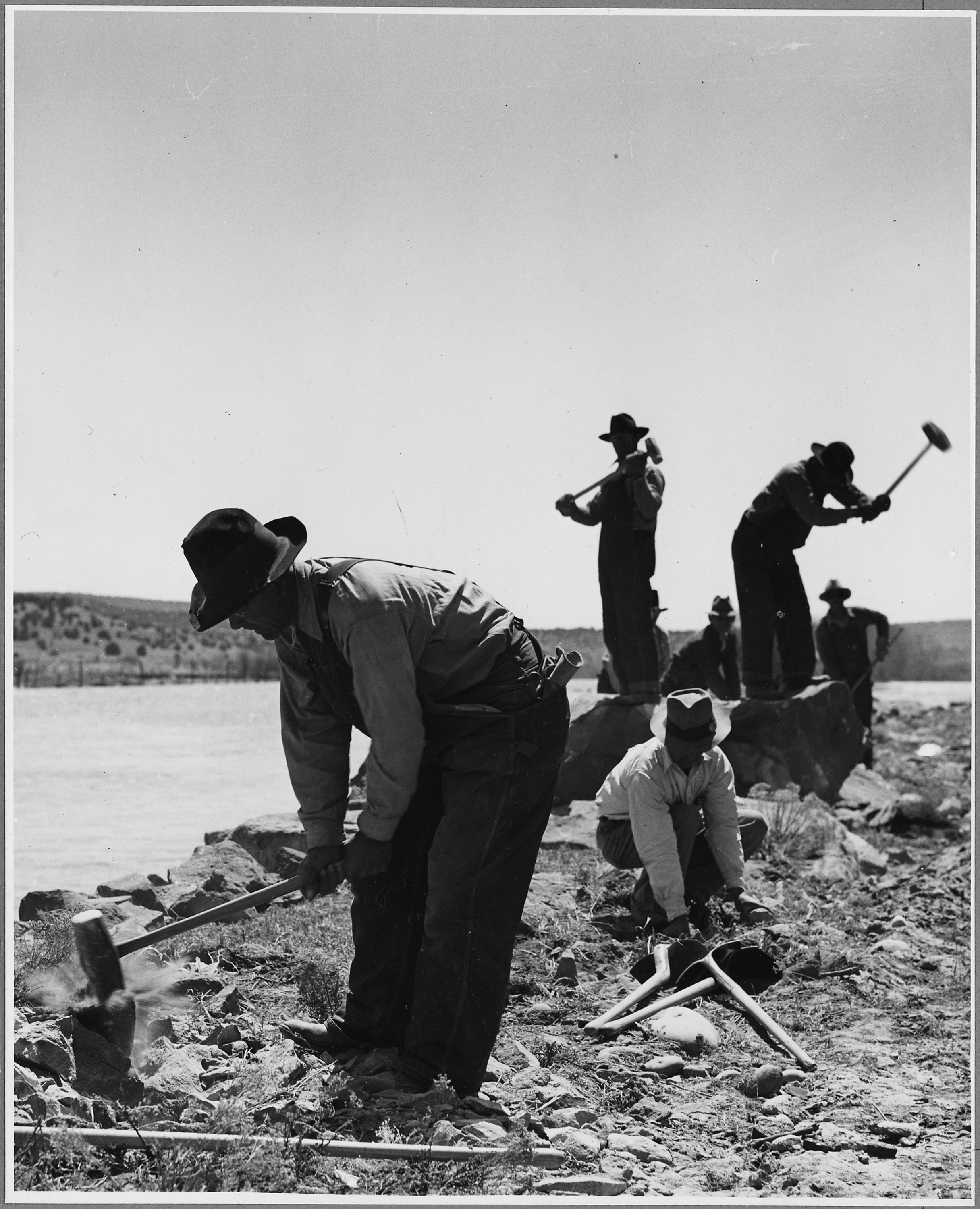
A group of men in San Miguel County, New Mexico performing manual labor.

== Occupational safety ==
Agriculture ranks among the most hazardous industries due to the use of chemicals and risk of injury. Farmers are at high risk for fatal and nonfatal injuries (general traumatic injury and musculoskeletal injury), work-related lung diseases, noise-induced hearing loss, skin diseases, chemical-related illnesses, and certain cancers associated with chemical use and prolonged sun exposure. In an average year, 516 workers die doing farm work in the U.S. (1992–2005). Every day, about 243 agricultural workers suffer lost-work-time injuries, and about 5% of these result in permanent impairment. Tractor overturns are the leading cause of agriculture-related fatal injuries, and account for over 90 deaths every year. The National Institute for Occupational Safety and Health recommends the use of rollover protection structures on tractors to reduce the risk of overturn-related fatal injuries.

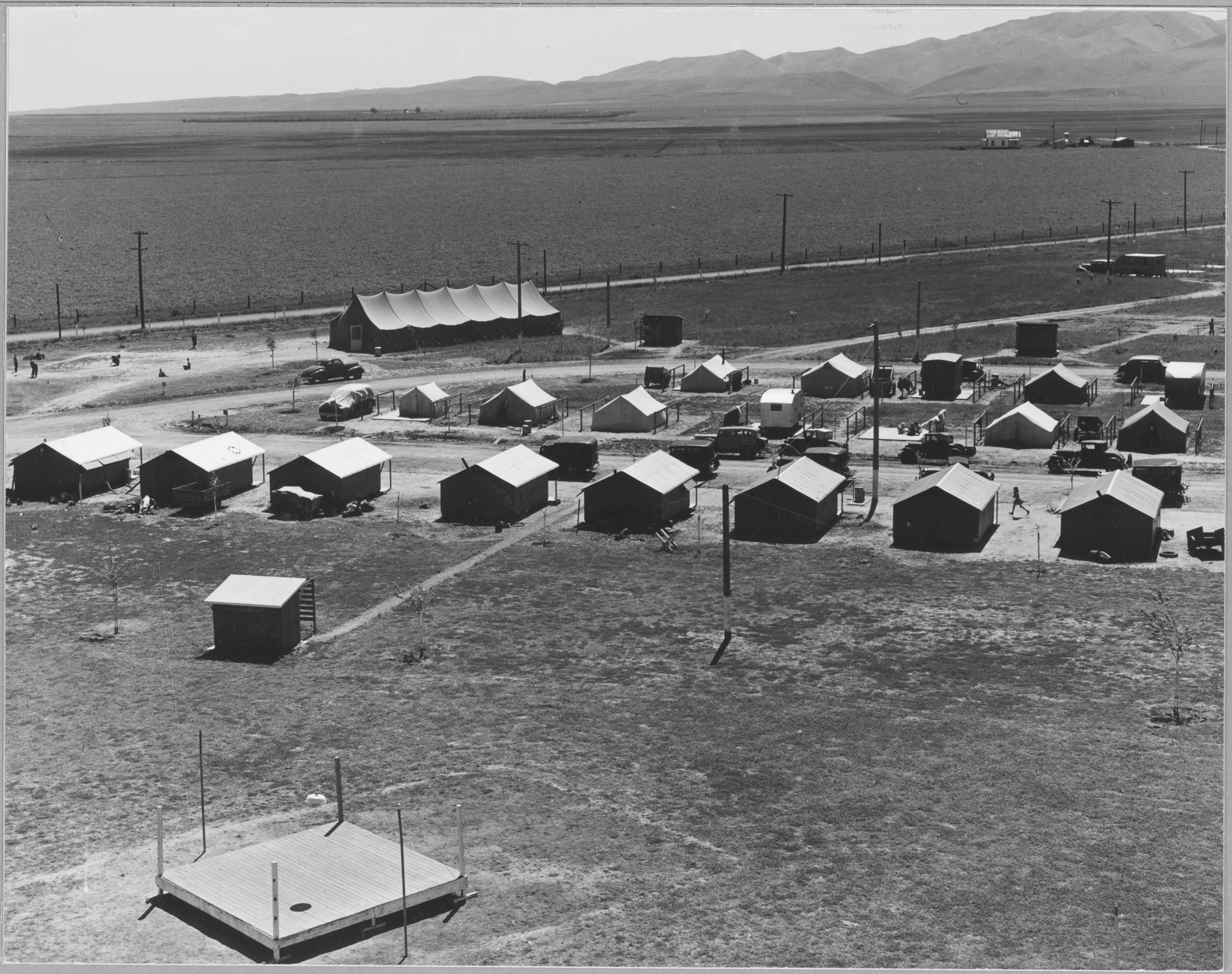
Pea harvesting season in San Joaquin, California calls for temporary labor camps to be set up for workers to live in close proximity to their work.

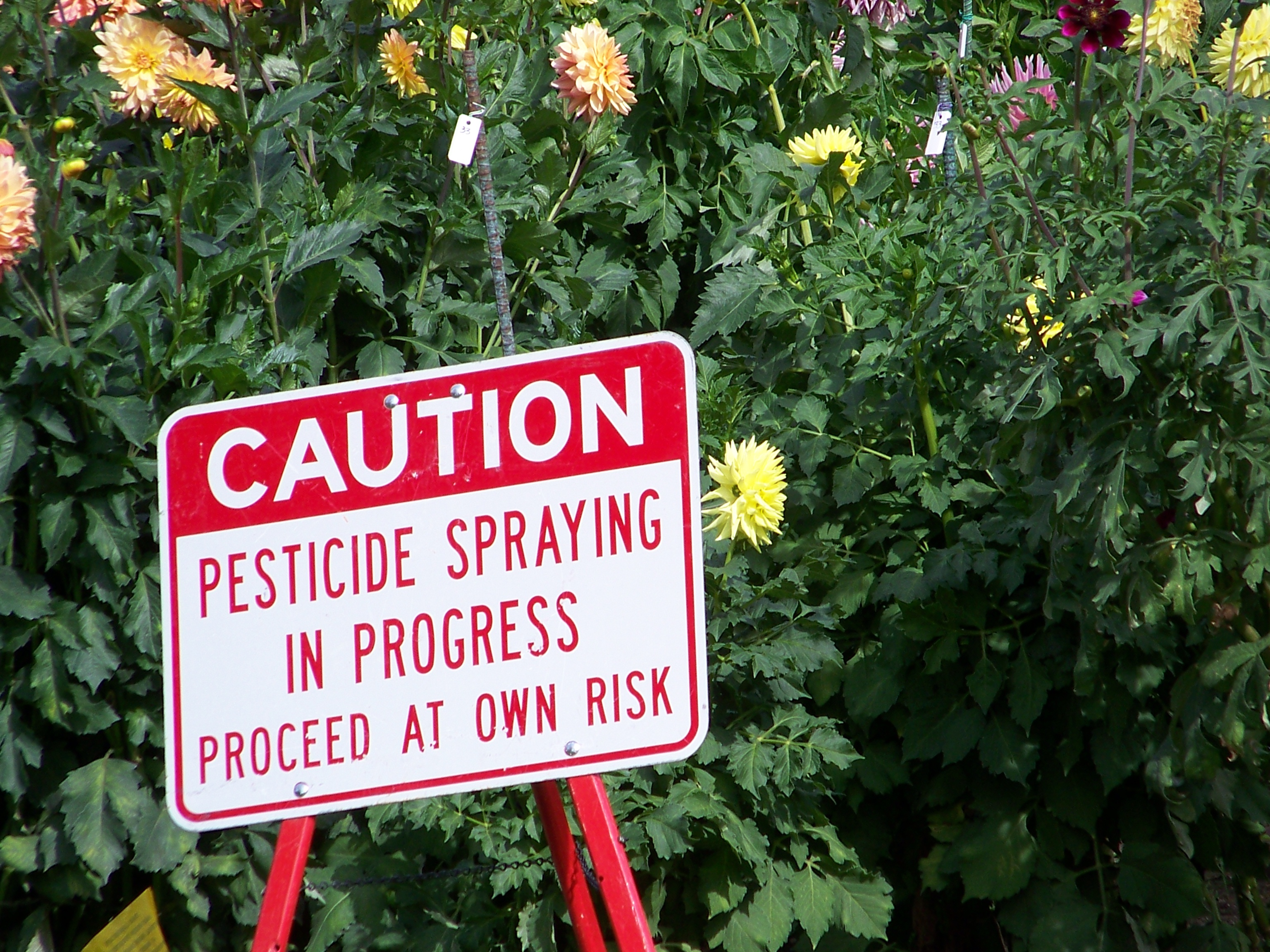
Caution sign warning of pesticide usage, located in Manito Park in Spokane, WA.

Farming is one of the few industries in which families (who often share the work and live on the premises) are also at risk for injuries, illness, and death. Agriculture is the most dangerous industry for young workers, accounting for 42% of all work-related fatalities of young workers in the U.S. between 1992 and 2000. In 2011, 108 youth, less than 20 years of age, died from farm-related injuries. Unlike other industries, half the young victims in agriculture were under age 15. For young agricultural workers aged 15–17, the risk of fatal injury is four times the risk for young workers in other workplaces Agricultural work exposes young workers to safety hazards such as machinery, confined spaces, work at elevations, and work around livestock. The most common causes of fatal farm-related youth injuries involve machinery, motor vehicles, or drowning. Together these three causes comprise more than half of all fatal injuries to youth on U.S. farms. Women in agriculture (including the related industries of forestry and fishing) numbered 556,000 in 2011.

=== Research centers ===
NIOSH CASH research centers are focused on the topic of health and safety in agricultural practices. These centers not only conduct research on the subject of occupational disease and injury prevention, but also promote agricultural health and safety through educational outreach programs.These groups funded by various state and federal agencies.

=== Farmer suicide ===
Farmers' suicides in the United States refers to the instances of American farmers taking their own lives, largely since the 1980s, partly due to their falling into debt, but mainly as a larger mental-health crisis among U.S. agriculture workers. In the Midwest alone, over 1,500 farmers have taken their own lives since the 1980s. It mirrors a crisis happening globally: in Australia, a farmer dies by suicide every ten days; in the United Kingdom, one farmer a week takes their own life; and in France it is one every two days. Almost 300,000 farmers have died by suicide since 1995 in India.

Farmers are among the most likely to die by suicide, in comparison to other occupations, according to a study published in January 2020 by the Centers for Disease Control and Prevention (CDC). Researchers at the University of Iowa found that farmers, and others in the agricultural trade, had the highest suicide rate of all occupations from 1992 to 2010, the years covered in a 2017 study. The rate was 3.5 times that of the general population. This echoed a study conducted the previous year by the CDC and another undertaken by the National Rural Health Association (NRHA).

Most family farmers seem to agree on what led to their plight: government policy. In the years after the New Deal, they say, the United States set a price floor for farmers, essentially ensuring they received a minimum wage for the crops they produced. But the government began rolling back this policy in the 1970s, and now the global market largely determines the price they get for their crops. Big farms can make do with lower prices for crops by increasing their scale; a few cents per gallon of cow's milk adds up if you have thousands of cows.

—Time, November 27, 2019

As of April 2023, the suicide rate within the farming community exceeds that of the general population by three and a half times.

== Impacts of agriculture on human health ==
Agriculture in the U.S. makes up approximately 75% of the country's pesticide use. Agricultural workers are at high risk for being exposed to dangerous levels of pesticides, whether or not they are directly working with the chemicals. For example, with issues like pesticide drift, farmworkers are not the only ones exposed to these chemicals; nearby residents come into contact with the pesticides as well. The frequent exposure to these pesticides can have detrimental effects on humans, resulting in adverse health reactions associated with pesticide poisoning. Migrant workers, especially women, are at higher risk for health issues associated with pesticide exposure due to lack of training or appropriate safety precautions. United States agricultural workers experience 10,000 cases or more of physician-diagnosed pesticide poisoning annually.

=== Drinking water contamination ===
The application of agricultural chemicals provides a threat to drinking water quality. Nitrate is a form of nitrogen found naturally in agricultural crops. Nitrate-based fertilizer salts replenish depleted nutrients in croplands throughout the United States. Drinking water contaminated with nitrate has been linked to methemoglobinemia, premature births, thyroid dysfunction, cancer, and cognitive impairment.

=== Heavy metals ===
Heavy metals, such as lead, zinc, and copper, are naturally found in sedimentary and igneous rocks. One way humans introduce these metals is through agricultural practices. Fertilizers containing phosphorus contribute to the amount of heavy metals in soils. Pesticides also add heavy metals to soils, depending on their chemical formula and toxicity. Heavy metal buildup in soils near bodies of water can contaminate drinking and recreational sources. The aggregation of heavy metals via air, water, and food can be detrimental to bones, organs, and organ systems. In children, exposure to lead, zinc, and copper can affect the nervous system.

=== Direct contact exposure ===
Farmworkers are exposed to organophosphate insecticides by direct contact or inhalation from aerial application. A pregnant mother can pass organophosphates to an unborn baby, potentially causing abnormal birth deformities. Prolonged exposure can lead to neurological complications in adults and delayed brain progression in children.

Neonicotinoid pesticides include imidacloprid, clothianidin, and thiamethoxam, which are applied in liquid form. It is absorbed through the skin and can cause both nervous systems to deteriorate, an abnormal opening in the heart wall, and liver destruction. In farmworkers, frequent application has also been linked to oxidative DNA damage, lung dysfunction, and neurological symptoms such as tremors and memory loss.

=== Environmental justice implications ===
The effects of agricultural contamination on low-income, marginalized communities have raised important environmental justice concerns. Farm workers and communities of color, who often live near the farms where they work are more likely to be exposed to harmful chemicals, pesticides, and nitrate through direct contact, inhalation, or drinking water.

Many of these communities source their drinking water from well water, that is at high risk of being contaminated with agricultural runoff, which can cause immediate and long-term health issues. Inequities of groundwater pollution are compounded in underserved communities by economic and deeper structural factors. Existing regulations in much of the United States, may not be adequate to control the contamination of ground water in these communities, especially those dependent on private well water, which does not require testing under the Safe Drinking Water Act.

== Environmental issues ==
=== Climate change ===
Climate change and agriculture are complexly related processes. In the United States, agriculture is the second largest emitter of greenhouse gases (GHG), behind the energy sector. Direct GHG emissions from the agricultural sector account for 8.4% of total U.S. emissions, but the loss of soil organic carbon through soil erosion indirectly contributes to emissions as well. While agriculture plays a role in propelling climate change, it is also affected by the direct (increase in temperature, change in rainfall, flooding, drought) and secondary (weed, pest, disease pressure, infrastructure damage) consequences of climate change. The United States Department of Agriculture (USDA) is a regulatory, research, and support body in American agriculture. They work to understanding the impact of climate change on farming and to helping American farmers adapt. USDA research indicates that these climatic changes will lead to a decline in yield and nutrient density in key crops, as well as decreased livestock productivity. Climate change poses unprecedented challenges to U.S. agriculture due to the sensitivity of agricultural productivity and costs to changing climate conditions. Rural communities dependent on agriculture are particularly vulnerable to climate change threats. Native communities are also vulnerable, and the Intertribal Agricultural Council (IAC) documents, supports, and advocates for the reintegrative practices of Native American and Alaskan agricultural producers. The IAC is particularly focused on the economic impact and potential of regenerative farming practices for native people.

The US Global Change Research Program (2017) identified four key areas of concern in the agriculture sector: reduced productivity, degradation of resources, health challenges for people and livestock, and the adaptive capacity of agriculture communities.

Large-scale adaptation and mitigation of these threats relies on changes in farming policy.

== Demographics ==
1,224,726 of 3,374,044 producers in the U.S. (36%) are female, as of 2022. This is 0.2% less than 2017 and varies based on state. It was highest in Arizona and Hawaii (48%). Inequality and respect are common issues for these workers, as many have reported that they are not being respected, listened to, or taken seriously due to traditional views of women as housewives and caretakers.

Women may also face resistance when attempting to advance to higher positions. Other issues reported by female farm workers include receiving less pay than their male counterparts and a refusal or reluctance by their employers to offer their female workers the same additional benefits given to male workers such as housing.

In 2022, there were 46,738 African-American farmers in the United States, 4% less than 2017. This represents 1.4% of all U.S. farmers. The vast majority of African-American farmers were in the south-eastern states. The state with the highest share of black farmers is Mississippi (12%).

== Industry ==
Historically, farmland has been owned by small property owners, but as of 2017 institutional investors, including foreign corporations, had been purchasing farmland. In 2013 the largest producer of pork, Smithfield Foods, was bought by a company from China.

As of 2017, only about 4% of farms have sales over $1m, but these farms yield two-thirds of total output. Some of these are large farms have grown organically from private family-owned businesses.

In the case of the meat-packing industry, large processing companies such as Tyson Foods, Hormel Foods and Pilgrim's Pride contract out to farmers to grow the chickens, then process, package, and possibly market them under their own brands. For example, in the 1960s, poultry processing companies experimented with owning and operating their own farms, but shifted away from it in later decades.

== Land ownership laws ==
As of 2019, six states—Hawaii, Iowa, Minnesota, Mississippi, North Dakota, and Oklahoma—have laws banning foreign ownership of farmland. Missouri, Ohio, and Oklahoma are looking to introduce bills banning foreign ownership as of 2019.

== See also ==
- Agribusiness
- Electrical energy efficiency on United States farms
- Farmers' suicides in the United States
- Fishing industry in the United States
- Genetic engineering in the United States
- History of African-American agriculture
- History of agriculture in the United States
- List of largest producing countries of agricultural commodities
- Pesticides in the United States
- Poultry farming in the United States
- Soil in the United States
- Urban–rural political divide#United States
