= Lee v Ashers Baking Company Ltd and others =

Supreme Court of the United Kingdom discrimination case

- Court: Supreme Court of the United Kingdom
- Full case name: Lee v Ashers Baking Company Ltd and others
- Decided: 2018
- Neutral citation: [2018] UKSC 49

Holding
- People cannot be forced to promote a belief they profoundly disagree with

Case opinions
- Majority: Lord Mance (Lady Hale of Richmond, Lord Kerr of Tonaghmore, Lord Hodge and Lady Black of Derwent concurred)

Area of law
- discrimination, compelled speech

Lee v Ashers Baking Company Ltd and others [2018] UKSC 49 was a Supreme Court of the United Kingdom discrimination case between Gareth Lee and Ashers Baking Company, owned by Daniel and Amy McArthur of Northern Ireland. Lee brought the case after Ashers refused to make a cake with a message promoting same-sex marriage, citing their religious beliefs. Following appeals, the Supreme Court overturned previous rulings in favour of Lee and made a judgement in favour of Ashers. The court said there was no discrimination against Lee and that Ashers' objections were with the message they were being asked to promote. The court held that people in the United Kingdom could not legally be forced to promote a message they fundamentally disagreed with. The case became known in the British and Irish media as the "gay cake" case.

== Background ==
In 2014 Gareth Lee, a gay rights activist, placed an order with Ashers Baking Company, a Belfast bakery, for a cake decorated with the slogan "support gay marriage" as same-sex marriage was illegal in Northern Ireland at the time. The McArthurs, who are Christians, declined the order and refunded Lee's money, saying they could not make a cake that supported something they found offensive to their religious beliefs. Lee complained to the Equality Commission for Northern Ireland that he had been directly discriminated against on the grounds of his sexual orientation, and the Equality Commission supported him in filing a discrimination lawsuit against Ashers and the McArthurs. The county court found in Lee's favour and ordered Ashers to pay him £500 in damages.

The case received considerable media attention. The human rights activist Peter Tatchell initially supported the county court decision, but later changed his mind, stating that he supported the McArthurs' right not to be forced to promote a message they disagree with. The actor Sir Patrick Stewart supported Ashers, telling the BBC: "It was not because this was a gay couple that they objected ...It was the actual words on the cake that they objected to, because they found them offensive. And I would support their right to say ‘no this is personally offensive to my beliefs, I will not do it’."

Ashers appealed to the Court of Appeal. The hearing was suspended temporarily when the Attorney General for Northern Ireland requested the case be referred to the Supreme Court due to a conflict between European human rights law and Northern Irish equality law. The Court of Appeal denied the request. The Court upheld the original verdict on the grounds of direct discrimination. Ashers then appealed to the Supreme Court of the United Kingdom, supported by the Attorney General for Northern Ireland. The Supreme Court agreed to hear the case on the grounds of forced or compelled speech, sitting to hear a case in Belfast for the first time since the court was established to replace the House of Lords in 2009.

== Case ==
The Supreme Court considered first whether the McArthurs had discriminated against Lee on the basis of his sexual orientation. The court found that the McArthurs did not refuse to make the cake on the grounds of Lee's personal sexual orientation but on the grounds that they disagreed with the message they were being asked to put on it. They ruled there was no direct discrimination. The court also considered associative discrimination, but again ruled that there was no discrimination on the basis of Lee's sexual orientation, as the McArthurs did not refuse service on those personal grounds. They ruled that the McArthurs would have refused to make the cake carrying the message for any customer regardless of the customer's sexual orientation.

The court then considered whether it was political discrimination under the Northern Ireland Act 1998 and the Human Rights Act 1998. They found that it was the message that was being discriminated against, not the person wishing to disseminate it. They also considered Ashers' rights under the Fair Employment and Treatment Order (FETO) and Article 9 of the European Convention on Human Rights, which had previously been considered by the European Court of Human Rights in Buscarini v San Marino (1999) 30 EHRR 208, and which said that obliging someone to promote a belief they do not support was a violation of their human rights. The court also considered obiter dicta the case of Masterpiece Cakeshop v. Colorado Civil Rights Commission, a case decided by the Supreme Court of the United States which had similar characteristics, while the judgment was being prepared. They noted the distinction made between someone refusing to make a cake because of a message they were being asked to put on the cake and refusing to make a cake because the person requesting it had a protected characteristic.

== Judgment ==
Lord Mance delivered the unanimous judgment with respect to the jurisdiction issues, with which Lady Hale, Lord Kerr, Lord Hodge and Lady Black agreed. Lady Hale delivered the unanimous judgment with respect to the discrimination issues. The Commission argued FETO had priority while Ashers argued that the Northern Ireland Act had. The court ruled that as the Northern Ireland Act was statute law, that would take priority. They also noted that the Attorney General for Northern Ireland's request to refer the case to the Supreme Court when the Court of Appeal denied it was legally valid, and that the Court of Appeal had made an error. It was held that based on the errors of the Court of Appeal and the judgments of the Supreme Court judges, the appeal was allowed and judgment was made in favour of Ashers. They held that no-one could be forced to promote a belief or opinion they did not believe in or profoundly disagreed with.

== Reaction ==
Ashers said the judgment was a victory for freedom of speech and religious expression. The Attorney-General of Northern Ireland supported the decision. Gareth Lee said "I’m very confused about what this actually means. We need certainty when you go to a business. I'm concerned that this has implications for myself and for every single person." Lee stated he felt like a "second class citizen" as a result.

The Coalition for Marriage and the Christian Institute, which covered Ashers' legal fees, supported the judgment. Ian Paisley, a Democratic Unionist Party MP, said he had written to the Northern Ireland Secretary calling for a review of the Equality Commission for Northern Ireland's funding, because of its support for this case. The Equality Commission responded to criticism for spending £250,000 of taxpayers' money on the case, saying that the spending took place over a period of four-and-a-half years and it was less than 20% of its budget.

Michael Wardlow, the head of the Equality Commission for Northern Ireland said, "...This judgment leaves a lack of clarity in equality law. Our understanding of certainty of the law has been overturned. The supreme court seems to see this as something that should be done on a case-by-case basis." John O'Doherty, the director of Northern Ireland's largest support organisation for LGBT people, the Rainbow Project, said "We believe this is direct discrimination for which there can be no justification. We will, however, take time to study this judgment by the supreme court to understand fully its implications for the rights of LGBT people to access goods, facilities and services without discrimination."

== European Court of Human Rights challenge ==
In August 2019, Lee instructed his lawyers to challenge the Supreme Court's ruling at the European Court of Human Rights (ECHR). In March 2020, the European Court communicated the case with the British government. On 6 January 2022, the court dismissed Lee's case as "inadmissible" as Lee had not invoked his rights under the European Convention on Human Rights "at any point in the domestic proceedings" in the British courts.

== See also ==
- LGBT rights in Northern Ireland
- Same-sex marriage in Northern Ireland
- Masterpiece Cakeshop v. Colorado Civil Rights Commission
