= Johanns v. Livestock Marketing Association =

- Supreme Court of the United States

Argued December 8, 2004 Decided May 23, 2005
- Full case name: Mike Johanns, Secretary of Agriculture, et al v. Livestock Marketing Association, et al
- Docket no.: 03-1164
- Citations: 544 U.S. 550 (more) 125 S. Ct. 2055; 161 L. Ed. 2d 896; 2005 U.S. LEXIS 4343
- Argument: Oral argument

Case history
- Prior: Judgment for Respondents, 207 F. Supp. 2d 992 (D.S.D. 2002); affirmed, 335 F.3d 711 (8th Cir. 2003); cert. granted, 541 U.S. 1062 (2004).

Holding
- When a check-off funds government speech, the government cannot be sued under the First Amendment for compelled speech.

Court membership
- Chief Justice William Rehnquist Associate Justices John P. Stevens · Sandra Day O'Connor; Antonin Scalia · Anthony Kennedy; David Souter · Clarence Thomas; Ruth Bader Ginsburg · Stephen Breyer

Case opinions
- Majority: Scalia, joined by Rehnquist, O'Connor, Thomas, Breyer
- Concurrence: Thomas
- Concurrence: Breyer
- Concurrence: Ginsburg (in judgment)
- Dissent: Kennedy
- Dissent: Souter, joined by Stevens, Kennedy

Laws applied
- U.S. Const. amend. I

Johanns v. Livestock Marketing Association, 544 U.S. 550 (2005), is a First Amendment case of the Supreme Court of the United States in which the court held that, when a check-off funds government speech, the government cannot be sued under the First Amendment for compelled speech. At issue was whether a beef producer could be compelled to contribute to beef industry advertising through an assessment called a check-off.

== Facts and prior history ==
Congress charters commodity checkoff programs compelling all producers of certain commodities to contribute to common research and advertising programs. The beef industry is covered by the Beef Promotion and Research Act (1985). Cattle producers disagreeing with the fee and represented by the Livestock Marketing Association sued the Department of Agriculture (USDA) in federal district court. The respondents alleged the government-required fee for advertising was compelled speech and violated their First Amendment right to free speech. The USDA argued the advertising was government speech immune from First Amendment challenge.

The district court and the Eighth Circuit Court of Appeals had found for the Livestock Marketing Association previously, ruling that the program violated the First Amendment and that the advertising was compelled and not government speech.

In a parallel petition (No. 03–1165), the Nebraska Cattlemen sided with the USDA and sued the Livestock Marketing Association. At the Supreme Court, the two cases were consolidated.

== Court decision ==
The Supreme Court's decision was announced on May 23, 2005, and delivered by Justice Antonin Scalia. The decision was 6–3 in favor of the USDA's position. Check-offs would continue. Advertising by these industry groups was government speech, therefore there was no infringement of First Amendment rights.

== Case revisited ==
The case is starting another trip through the courts, starting in Montana with Ranchers-Cattlemen Action Legal Fund v. Sonny Perdue.

The Cattlemen's Beef Board (CBB) and USDA oversee the collection and spending of checkoff funds. Additionally, all producers selling cattle or calves, for any reason and regardless of age or sex, must pay $1-per-head. The buyer generally is responsible for collecting $1-per-head from the seller, but both are responsible for seeing that the dollar is collected and paid.
