= Turner Broadcasting System, Inc. v. FCC =

Turner Broadcasting v. Federal Communications Commission
- Supreme Court of the United States

Argued October 7, 1996 Decided March 31, 1997
- Full case name: Turner Broadcasting System, Incorporated, et al., Appellants v. Federal Communications Commission, et al.
- Citations: 520 U.S. 180 (more)

Case history
- Prior: Turner Broadcasting v. FCC, 910 F. Supp. 734 (D.D.C., 1995); Turner Broadcasting v. FCC, 512 U.S. 622 (1994); Turner Broadcasting v. FCC, 819 F. Supp. 32 (D.D.C., 1993).

Holding
- Must-carry regulations are not a violation of the First Amendment rights of cable television companies.

Court membership
- Chief Justice William Rehnquist Associate Justices John P. Stevens · Sandra Day O'Connor; Antonin Scalia · Anthony Kennedy; David Souter · Clarence Thomas; Ruth Bader Ginsburg · Stephen Breyer

Case opinions
- Majority: Kennedy, joined by Rehnquist, Stevens, Souter; and Breyer (in part)
- Concurrence: Stevens
- Concur/dissent: Breyer (in part)
- Dissent: O'Connor, joined by Scalia, Thomas, and Ginsburg

Laws applied
- First Amendment, Cable Television Consumer Protection and Competition Act

Turner Broadcasting System, Inc. v. FCC is the general title of two rulings of the United States Supreme Court on the constitutionality of must-carry regulations enforced by the Federal Communications Commission on cable television operators. In the first ruling, known colloquially as Turner I, 512 U.S. 622 (1994), the Supreme Court held that cable television companies were First Amendment speakers who enjoyed free speech rights when determining what channels and content to carry on their networks, but demurred on whether the must-carry rules at issue were restrictions of those rights. After a remand to a lower court for fact-finding on the economic effects of the Cable Television Consumer Protection and Competition Act of 1992, the dispute returned to the Supreme Court. In Turner II, 520 U.S. 180 (1997), the Supreme Court held that must-carry rules for cable television companies were not restrictions of their free speech rights because the U.S. government had a compelling interest in enabling the distribution of media content from multiple sources and in preserving local television.

== Background ==
When American consumers widely migrated to cable television in the 1980s, regulators became concerned about the viability of older terrestrial and local television stations, which could not compete with cable television but which were essential for delivering local news and other essential information. Additionally, consumers who had signed up for cable service would have no further need for their antennas, which were previously the only means to pick up local television stations.

Typically, cable television network operators voluntarily carried local stations because they were popular with consumers, but those channels took up space on the cable network that could be dedicated to more profitable channels. The Cable Television Consumer Protection and Competition Act of 1992, via a group of provisions that became known as must-carry regulations, required cable operators to include all relevant local broadcast stations in their offerings to an area's consumers, and to dedicate up to one-third of their channels for this purpose if necessary. This was done to promote localism in television content as required by the Communications Act of 1934 and to maintain the viability of local broadcasters. The rules were to be enforced by the Federal Communications Commission (FCC).

Soon after the statute's passage, various cable television companies, represented by Turner Broadcasting System, filed suit in the US District Court for the District of Columbia. The companies alleged that they exercised free speech via their content delivery choices, and the must-carry rules requiring them to provide television channels that they would not otherwise carry were a form of unconstitutional compelled speech. Furthermore, the companies argued that the must-carry rules were a type of content-based regulation that required a strict scrutiny analysis to determine if the government's interest in molding the television marketplace outweighed the companies' First Amendment rights. In 1993, the District Court rejected those arguments and held that the must-carry rules were a type of economic regulation in which Congress employed "its regulatory powers over the economy to impose order upon a market in dysfunction." Under a less demanding intermediate scrutiny analysis for non-content-based regulations, the District Court held that the preservation of local broadcasting was an important governmental interest, and that the must-carry provisions were acceptably tailored to serve that interest.

Turner Broadcasting System appealed that decision. Statutory provisions for cases involving federal regulations allowed a direct appeal to the U.S. Supreme Court, which granted certiorari in 1994.

== Turner I ruling ==
In the Supreme Court's first review of the must-carry rules, now known as the Turner I ruling, the court focused primarily on whether the rules were a content-based regulation requiring a strict scrutiny analysis to determine if freedom of speech or freedom of the press had been violated. This would demand a complex examination of whether requiring a cable company to carry a TV station against its will was a type of compelled speech. Government attempts to require a media outlet to publish content against its will were deemed unconstitutional under the First Amendment in Miami Herald v. Tornillo (1974). However, that case involved newspapers, and the Supreme Court had also ruled in Red Lion Broadcasting Co. v. FCC (1969) that the FCC had greater economic authority over television due to the scarcity of broadcast frequencies and the pervasiveness of mass media content. Furthermore, courts had also determined that cable television operators had obligations to local communities due to the burdens of building network infrastructure.

These conflicting precedents necessitated an updated analysis of whether must-carry rules were benefits to local communities and whether they were burdensome for cable TV operators, with the assumption that those operators have free speech rights as well. The Supreme Court found the analysis of these matters, both by the District Court and Congress when writing the Cable Television Consumer Protection and Competition Act, to be deficient. Thus, the Supreme Court vacated the 1993 District Court ruling that upheld the must-carry rules and remanded the case to that court for further fact-finding on the economic and speech implications of the statute.

The case landed back at the D.C. District Court in 1995 for further investigation of impacts on consumers and cable companies. That court then reached the same conclusion that it had in 1993, finding that the must-carry regulations had a purely economic impact with no significant burden on content or the free speech rights of cable companies. Again exercising a less demanding intermediate scrutiny analysis for non-content-based regulations, the District Court held that the government had an important interest in preserving local broadcast TV channels. Turner Broadcasting System once again appealed to the Supreme Court with a compelled speech argument against the evidence compiled by the District Court.

== Turner II ruling ==
The Supreme Court heard the updated case, now known as Turner II, in October 1996. Acknowledging the cable companies' compelled speech argument, the Supreme Court analyzed the must-carry regulations under the more demanding strict scrutiny analysis to determine if the companies' free speech rights were violated. In a majority opinion written by Associate Justice Anthony Kennedy, the Supreme Court ruled in favor of the government. However, the portion of Kennedy's opinion upholding the must-carry regulations as furthering the government interest of promoting fair competition was only joined by three other justices, demoting the rationale to a plurality decision. In the majority's view, the regulations were narrowly-tailored by only requiring those stations to be added to an existing cable network that likely had space available, and allowing consumer choice on which channels to watch was not unduly restrictive for cable operators. Therefore, the must-carry regulations were constitutional and did not infringe on the First Amendment rights of cable television companies.

Associate Justice Stephen Breyer provided the majority with its fifth vote to uphold the must-carry regulations, but he wrote a partial concurrence that rejected Kennedy's antitrust rationale. Instead, Breyer believed the compelling government interest was the preservation of local television to widely disseminate information from many sources.

== Impact ==
After the Supreme Court's final ruling in 1997 on the constitutionality of must-carry cable regulations, the enforcement of such regulations by the FCC was deemed essential in prolonging the viability of local television channels in an unfavorable media landscape. The rapid expansion of cable networks quickly reduced the technological burden of carrying local channels. These developments were particularly important for the viability of public television in the United States, which was unlikely to be financially viable in the cable-dominated marketplace.

However, many legal commentators were unconvinced by the Supreme Court's stance that must-carry regulations were not compelled speech or a taking of property, and others found the court's examination of the economic impacts on local and national media markets to be insufficient. The case was influential throughout the era in which cable was the dominant format for consumer television, but its applicability for later digital and streaming systems is uncertain.

== See also ==
- List of United States Supreme Court cases, volume 520
- List of United States Supreme Court cases by the Rehnquist Court
- United States free speech exceptions
