= Ranchers-Cattlemen Action Legal Fund v. USDA =

R-CALF v USDA
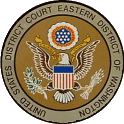
- Court: United States District Court for the Eastern District of Washington
- Full case name: Ranchers-Cattlemen Action Legal Fund; United Stockgrowers of Washington v. United States Department of Agriculture and Sonny Perdue in his official capacity as Secretary of Agriculture
- Defendants: United States Department of Agriculture and Sonny Perdue
- Plaintiffs: Ranchers-Cattlemen Action Legal Fund; United Stockgrowers of Washington

Court membership
- Judge sitting: Rosanna Malouf Peterson

Ranchers-Cattlemen Action Legal Fund v. USDA (No. 2:17-cv-00223) is a challenge to USDA rules that allow Mexican and Canadian beef to be labelled as domestic beef.

This case is distinguished from Ranchers-Cattlemen Action Legal Fund v. Sonny Perdue (No. 4:16-cv-00041-BMM) in which plaintiffs allege that checkoff dollars are being used to support Canadian and Mexican beef.

== Facts and prior history ==
In 2016, the United States Department of Agriculture rescinded regulations requiring Mexican and Canadian beef be marked as imported. Plaintiffs filed the complaint May 19, 2017.

In March 2018, plaintiffs asked for a summary judgement in their favor.

== Developments ==
- First Amendment Challenge to Beef Checkoff Program Dismissed On March 27, 2020
- Serial Legal Challenges to Federal Beef Checkoff Program Continue on September 11, 2020
- Federal Appeals Court Upholds Dismissal of R-CALF Beef Checkoff Challenge On July 27, 2021
