= Walker v. Texas Division, Sons of Confederate Veterans =

- Supreme Court of the United States

Argued March 23, 2015 Decided June 18, 2015
- Full case name: John Walker, III, Chairman, Texas Department of Motor Vehicles Board, et al., Petitioners v. Texas Division, Sons of Confederate Veterans, Inc., et al.
- Docket no.: 14-144
- Citations: 576 U.S. 200 (more) 135 S. Ct. 2239; 192 L. Ed. 2d 274

Case history
- Prior: Summary judgment granted, Texas Division, Sons of Confederate Veterans v. Vandergriff, No. 1:11-cv-01049 (W.D. Tex. April 12, 2013); reversed, 759 F.3d 388 (5th Cir. 2014); cert. granted, 135 S. Ct. 752 (2014).

Court membership
- Chief Justice John Roberts Associate Justices Antonin Scalia · Anthony Kennedy; Clarence Thomas · Ruth Bader Ginsburg; Stephen Breyer · Samuel Alito; Sonia Sotomayor · Elena Kagan

Case opinions
- Majority: Breyer, joined by Thomas, Ginsburg, Sotomayor, Kagan
- Dissent: Alito, joined by Roberts, Scalia, Kennedy

Laws applied
- U.S. Const. amend. I

Walker v. Texas Division, Sons of Confederate Veterans, 576 U.S. 200 (2015), was a United States Supreme Court case in which the Court held that license plates are government speech and are consequently more easily regulated/subjected to content restrictions than private speech under the First Amendment.

The Texas Division of the Sons of Confederate Veterans sought to have a specialty license plate issued in the state of Texas with an image of the Confederate Battle Flag. The request was denied prompting the group to sue, claiming that denying a specialty plate was a First Amendment violation.

== Opinion of the Court ==
The majority opinion, written by Associate Justice Stephen Breyer, relied heavily on the Court's 2009 decision in Pleasant Grove City v. Summum, which stated that a city in Utah was not obliged to place a monument from a minor religion in a public park, even though it had one devoted to the Ten Commandments. The court ruled that refusing the minor monument was a valid expression of government speech that did not infringe on the First Amendment's guarantee of free speech. Breyer wrote that the inclusion of a message on a state-issued license plate implies government endorsement of that message, and that car owners "could simply display the message in question in larger letters on a bumper sticker right next to the plate."

Justice Samuel Alito wrote the dissent, arguing that specialty license plates are more commonly regarded as a limited public forum for private expression, consisting of "little mobile billboards on which motorists can display their own messages". Therefore, rejecting the design basically amounts to viewpoint discrimination.

== Charleston shooting ==
Because of the proximity in time of the Supreme Court's decision with the Charleston church shooting in 2015, the decision was discussed in the media in relation to a controversy that arose in response to the shooting. The massacre was directed at nine African American churchgoers at the Emanuel African Methodist Episcopal Church. The most notable victim of the shooting, Clementa C. Pinckney, was a senior pastor of the church and the youngest African American man elected to the South Carolina General Assembly in 1996 at the age of twenty-three; the alleged killer, Dylann Roof, was depicted in images with Confederate battle flags on his infamous white supremacist website, including one with a Confederate flag on his license plate. At the time of the shooting, the Confederate battle flag flew on the South Carolina State House grounds.

As an example of Walker's relevance to the controversy, six days after the Charleston shooting, three state governors—Terry McAuliffe of Virginia (a Democrat), Pat McCrory of North Carolina (a Republican), and Larry Hogan of Maryland (a Republican)—announced plans to seek discontinuation of their state's Confederate flag specialty license plates. The governors cited the Supreme Court's decision in Walker in support of their position.

Associate Justice Alito, writing for the dissent, discussed the meaning of the Confederate flag to different social groups:

The Confederate battle flag is a controversial symbol. To the Texas Sons of Confederate Veterans, it is said to evoke the memory of their ancestors and other soldiers who fought for the South in the Civil War. To others, it symbolizes slavery, segregation, and hatred.

== See also ==
- List of United States Supreme Court cases, volume 576
- Summers v. Adams, 2009 Circuit Court case concerning "I Believe" on a vanity South Carolina license plate
- Wooley v. Maynard, a 1976 U.S. Supreme Court case concerning the state motto "Live Free or Die" on New Hampshire's license plates
