= Compelled speech =

Transmission of expression required by law

Compelled speech is a transmission of expression required by law. A related legal concept is protected speech. Just as freedom of speech protects free expression, in many cases it similarly protects an individual from being required to utter or otherwise express a thought with which that individual disagrees.

== Canada ==
Freedom of expression is a fundamental freedom under Section 2 of the Canadian Charter of Rights and Freedoms. The Supreme Court of Canada has interpreted this right as including "the right to say nothing or the right not to say certain things." In RJR-MacDonald Inc v Canada (AG), tobacco companies successfully challenged legislation requiring them to include unattributed health warnings on packaging. In Lavigne v Ontario Public Service Employees Union, the Court held that mandatory union membership and dues, some of which were used for purposes the union member disagreed with, did not violate his right to freedom of expression. In Slaight Communications Inc. v Davidson, the Court held that a requirement to provide a reference letter for a former employee who was unjustly dismissed did infringe the employer's freedom of expression, but this infringement was upheld as a reasonable limitation under section 1 of the Charter.

In 2016, University of Toronto psychology professor and clinical psychologist Jordan Peterson argued that amendments to the Canadian Human Rights Act and the Criminal Code would require compelled speech. The amendments added gender expression and gender identity as protected grounds to the Canadian Human Rights Act and to the Criminal Code provisions dealing with hate propaganda, incitement to genocide, and aggravating factors in sentencing. Peterson argued that the law would allow him to be fined or imprisoned if he refused to refer to students by their preferred gender pronouns. Legal experts challenged Peterson's interpretation, saying that the bill would not criminalize using non-preferred pronouns.

In 2021, Polish-Canadian pastor Artur Pawlowski was ordered by a court to inform his audience of the established opinions of medical experts regarding COVID-19 when expressing his views on the topic in a public setting. The requirement was a part of his probation conditions, which he had been placed on as a sentence for contempt of court, after he violated a court order requiring him to obey public health restrictions. However, the sentence was overturned on appeal.

== United Kingdom ==
Article 10 of the European Convention on Human Rights protects the right of freedom of expression, and section 3(1) of the Human Rights Act 1998, requires that as far as possible all legislation be given effect in a way which is compatible with this. In Lee v Ashers Baking Company Ltd, the Supreme Court considered whether a bakery in Northern Ireland had violated anti-discrimination law by refusing to decorate a cake with a message in support of gay marriage, with which the bakers disagreed on religious grounds. They held that although the bakery may have discriminated on the basis of the customer's political beliefs, which would in itself contravene the Fair Employment and Treatment (Northern Ireland) Order 1998, the legislation had to be "read down" in a way which would not violate the defendants' Article 10 rights, taken to include the right not to express a particular opinion. The right in Article 9 is a limited right because it permits restrictions on free speech that are necessary in a democratic society in pursuit of a legitimate aim, but the Supreme Court found that no such justification existed in this case. The court also considered whether the defendants had discriminated based on sexual orientation, but because they concluded that they had not done, the court did not need to consider whether the relevant legislation should be similarly read down.

=== Scotland ===
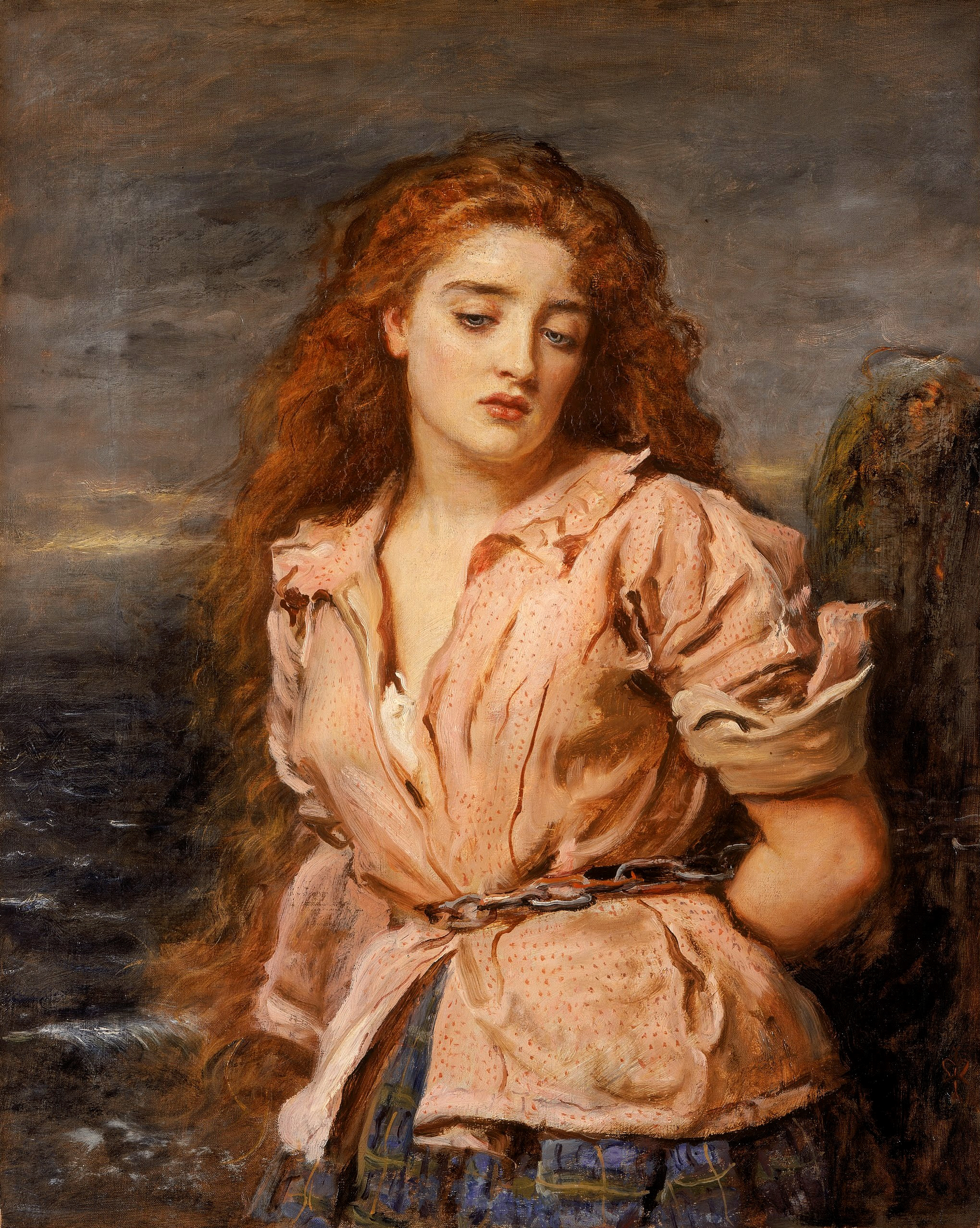
Margaret Wilson, executed by drowning for refusing to swear an oath

During The Killing Time of the 1680s, an Abjuration Oath could be put to suspects where they were given the option to abjure or renounce their allegiances. The terms of the oath were deliberately designed to offend the consciences of the Presbyterian Covenanters. Those who would not swear "whether they have arms, or not" could be "immediately killed" by field trial "before two witnesses" on a charge of high treason. John Brown was included among those executed in this judicial process by John Graham, 1st Viscount Dundee (Bluidy Clavers) on 1 May 1685. The wives and children of such men could also be put out of their houses if they had spoken to the suspect or refused the oath themselves. 18-year-old Margaret Wilson and 63-year-old Margaret McLaughlan were killed "without human hand" when they were drowned in the sea for refusing to take the Abjuration Oath.

== United States ==
The Supreme Court has determined that the First Amendment also protects citizens from being compelled by the government to say or to pay for certain speech. In West Virginia State Board of Education v. Barnette (1943), the Court ruled that school children could not be punished for refusing either to say the pledge of allegiance or salute the American flag. The Court also overruled Minersville School District v. Gobitis (1940), which had upheld such punishments of school children. In National Institute of Family and Life Advocates v. Becerra (2018), the Court ruled that a California law requiring crisis pregnancy centers to post notices informing patients they can obtain free or low-cost abortions and include the number of the state agency that can connect the women with abortion providers violated those centers' right to free speech. In Janus v. AFSCME (2018), the Court ruled that requiring a public sector employee to pay dues to a union of which he is not a member violated the First Amendment. According to the Court, "the First Amendment does not permit the government to compel a person to pay for another party's speech just because the government thinks that the speech furthers the interests of the person who does not want to pay." The Court also overruled Abood v. Detroit Board of Education (1977), which had upheld legally obligating public sector employees to pay such dues.

=== Examples of compelled speech supported by law ===
- Requiring a cable system to carry local stations – Turner Broadcasting v. FCC (1994)
- Mandatory university fees that support groups with which other students disagree – Board of Regents of the University of Wisconsin System v. Southworth (2000)
- Mandatory fees on agricultural products to support advertising – Johanns v. Livestock Marketing Association (2005)
- Subpoenas to companies compelling testimony that may be self-incriminatory
- Filing a tax return
- Consumer safety warnings, such as cellphone radiation disclosures and the Surgeon General's warning on alcohol and tobacco products

=== Examples of compelled speech rejected as illegal ===
- Compelled self-incriminating testimony by an individual – Fifth Amendment (1789)
- Mandating saluting the flag or reciting the Pledge of Allegiance – West Virginia State Board of Education v. Barnette (1943)
- Compulsory school attendance past the eighth grade – Wisconsin v. Yoder (1972)
- Requiring a newspaper to publish an advertisement – Miami Herald v. Tornillo (1974)
- Preventing motorists from covering a state motto on a license plate – Wooley v. Maynard (1977)
- Requiring organizations to publish opposing viewpoints to their own – Pacific Gas & Electric Co. v. Public Utilities Commission (1986)
- Requiring crisis pregnancy centers to post state disclosures about alternative services - National Institute of Family and Life Advocates v. Becerra (2018)
- Compelling an employer to allow its employees to display political messages (2022 Whole Foods NLRB case)

=== Government speech ===
- A city may accept a donation of statue from one religious group and refuse to accept one from another – Pleasant Grove City v. Summum (2009)
- A state may choose not to offer a license plate with a particular message – Walker v. Texas Division, Sons of Confederate Veterans (2015)
