= Summers v. Adams =

- Court: United States District Court for the District of South Carolina
- Full case name: Summers v. Adams
- Decided: November 10, 2009
- Docket nos.: 3:08-cv-02265
- Citation: 669 F. Supp. 2d 637

Case history
- Subsequent actions: Opinion corrected, December 14, 2009.

Court membership
- Judge sitting: Cameron McGowan Currie

Summers v. Adams, 669 F. Supp. 2d 637 (D.S.C. 2009), was a case where the United States District Court for the District of South Carolina ruled that South Carolina's "I Believe" Act was unconstitutional for violating the Establishment Clause of the First Amendment to the United States Constitution. The law authorized the state's Department of Motor Vehicles to create a license plate that had to contain "the words 'I Believe' and a cross superimposed on a stained glass window."

== Facts ==
=== Genesis of the "I Believe" Act ===
South Carolina law allows for organizations to file for customized license plates that can be sold statewide. After an unsuccessful attempt at implementing a similar license plate in Florida, Lieutenant Governor André Bauer proposed the "I Believe" Act with State Senator Yancey McGill. On April 24, 2008, the act was introduced to the Senate and by May 21, 2008, the bill had been passed unanimously through both the Senate and the House.

The "I Believe" Act reads as follows:

The Department of Motor Vehicles may issue "I Believe" special motor vehicle license plates to owners of private motor vehicles registered in their names. The plate must contain the words "I Believe" and a cross superimposed on a stained glass window. The biennial fee for this special license plate is the same as the fee provided in Article 5, Chapter 3 of this title. The guidelines for the production of this special license plate must meet the requirements contained in Section 56-3-8100.

On June 5, 2008, the aforementioned act became law without the signature of Governor Mark Sanford.

The Department of Motor Vehicles debuted the new license plate on their website on October 30, 2008, and began taking orders from residents. Three days later they had over four-hundred prepaid applications for the "I Believe" plate, allowing them to begin production, but that November the plaintiffs, four religious leaders and two non-profit religious-cultural organizations, filed for preliminary injunction and successfully stalled production of the plates on December 11, 2008.

== Issues ==
=== Plaintiffs ===
The Plaintiffs included: Rev. Dr. Thomas A. Summers, Rev. Robert M. Knight, Rabbi Sanford T. Marcus, Rev. Dr. Neal Jones, Hindu American Foundation, and American-Arab Anti-Discrimination Committee.

The plaintiffs opposed the "I Believe" Act on two grounds:

- The Act violates the Establishment Clause of the First Amendment to the United States Constitution by advancing, endorsing, and/or promoting religion.
- The Act violates the Free Speech Clause by "providing a forum to Christians to which other religions are not given equal access."

However, when the courts doubted whether or not the plaintiffs had standing on the second accusation, they dismissed the second argument and chose to just focus solely on the violation of the Establishment Clause.

=== Defendants ===
The defendant and the Director of the South Carolina Department of Motor Vehicles, Marcia S. Adams, considered the proposed license plate's purpose a secular one. She argued that the plate was to "provide South Carolina motorist with another message that they can elect to convey when selecting from over one hundred available special license plates." She notes that the "I Believe" plate provided an alternative to the "In Reason We Trust" plate (which was a secular take on the phrase "In God We Trust").

The Attorney General of South Carolina, Henry McMaster, argued another position when he gave his amicus curiae brief. He described it as "[r]ather than being motivated by a secular purpose, the ['I Believe' Act] is instead an accommodation to Christians, just as the other plates are accommodations to Parrot Heads and fraternity and sorority members."

== Opinion of the Court ==
The court applied the United States Supreme Court's precedent in Lemon v. Kurtzman per the doctrine of stare decisis. The "I Believe" Act's constitutionality was decided by application of the Lemon Test, the three prongs of which are:

1. The government's action must have a secular legislative purpose;
2. The government's action must not have the primary effect of either advancing or inhibiting religion;
3. The government's action must not result in an "excessive government entanglement" with religion.

First, the court ruled that the "I Believe" Act was not intended to serve a secular purpose. Instead of making it easier for all groups to get custom plates, the bill only allowed "I Believe" to be backed by a cross and stained glass window. That caused the plate to be "uniquely Christian". The fact that the plate idea was not initiated by any group or organization, but by the Lieutenant Governor André Bauer, allowed the court to quickly rule that the government's action did not have a secular purpose.

For the second prong, the test requires that the primary effect of the action must not advance or inhibit religion. The court ruled that the act's primary effect was promoting a specific religion, Christianity. Because Christianity is the only religion represented, it "signals" that it's the preferred religion. Quoting Wallace v. Jaffree, the Establishment Clause "preclude[s] government from conveying or attempting to convey a message that religion or a particular religious belief is favored or preferred."

The last prong included in the Lemon Test forbids "excessive government entanglement" with religion. The court found the "I Believe" Act also failed the final prong. The court saw the state's decision to use Christian symbols on a government-sponsored license plate the first sign of entanglement. Adopting one religious belief will cause the legislature to vote and decide what other beliefs are "worthy", seen as an even greater risk of entanglement. When Lieutenant Governor André Bauer and Attorney General Henry McMaster went around the state speaking at church rallies in support of the "I Believe" Act, they not only caused further entanglement, but also went back on the decision in Elk Grove Unified School District v. Newdow. That decision stated that "the essential command of the Establishment Clause... [is] that government not make a person's religious beliefs relevant to his or her standing in the political community by conveying a message 'that religion or a particular religious belief is favored or preferred.'"

== See also ==
- Walker v. Texas Division, Sons of Confederate Veterans, a 2015 Supreme Court case concerning a Confederate organization on a vanity Texas license plate
