= List of songs recorded by Boston =

A list of songs recorded by American rock band Boston.

== List ==
Name of song, writer(s), original release, and year of release
Song	Writer(s)	Original release	Year	Ref.
"Amanda"	Tom Scholz	Third Stage	1986	
"Can'tcha Say (You Believe in Me)"	Tom Scholz; Gerry Green; Brad Delp	Third Stage	1986	
"Cool the Engines"	Tom Scholz; Fran Sheehan; Brad Delp	Third Stage	1986	
"Corporate America"	Tom Scholz	Corporate America	2002	
"Cryin'"	Anton Cosmo	Corporate America	2002	
"Didn't Mean to Fall in Love" (Note: A reworked version appears on Life, Love & Hope)	Tom Scholz; Curly Smith; Janet Minto	Corporate America	2002	
"Don't Be Afraid"	Tom Scholz	Don't Look Back	1978	
"Don't Look Back"	Tom Scholz	Don't Look Back	1978	
"Feelin' Satisfied"	Tom Scholz	Don't Look Back	1978	
"Foreplay/Long Time"	Tom Scholz	Boston	1976	
"Get Organ-ized/Get Reorgan-ized"	Tom Scholz	Walk On	1994	
"Heaven on Earth"	Tom Scholz	Life, Love & Hope	2013	
"Higher Power"	Tom Scholz; David Sikes	Greatest Hits	1997	
"Hitch a Ride"	Tom Scholz	Boston	1976	
"Hollyann"	Tom Scholz	Third Stage	1986	
"I Had a Good Time"	Tom Scholz	Corporate America	2002	
"I Need Your Love"	Tom Scholz; Fred Sampson	Walk On	1994	
"I Think I Like It"	Tom Scholz; Jon DeBrigard	Third Stage	1986	
"If You Were in Love"	Tom Scholz	Life, Love & Hope	2013	
"It's Easy"	Tom Scholz	Don't Look Back	1978	
"The Journey"	Tom Scholz	Don't Look Back	1978	
"Last Day of School"	Tom Scholz	Life, Love & Hope	2013	
"The Launch"	Tom Scholz	Third Stage	1986	
"Let Me Take You Home Tonight"	Brad Delp	Boston	1976	
"Life, Love and Hope"	Tom Scholz	Life, Love & Hope	2013	
"Livin' for You" (Note: A live version appears on Corporate America (2002))	Tom Scholz	Walk On	1994	
"Love Got Away"	Tom Scholz	Life, Love & Hope	2013	
"Magdalene"	Tom Scholz; David Sikes; Galen "Rusty" Foulke	Walk On	1994	
"A Man I'll Never Be"	Tom Scholz	Don't Look Back	1978	
"More Than a Feeling"	Tom Scholz	Boston	1976	
"My Destination"	Tom Scholz	Third Stage	1986	
"A New World"	Jim Masdea	Third Stage	1986	
"O Canada"	Tom Scholz	Life, Love & Hope (LP bonus track)	2013	
"Party"	Tom Scholz; Brad Delp	Don't Look Back	1978	
"Peace of Mind"	Tom Scholz	Boston	1976	
"Rock & Roll Band"	Tom Scholz	Boston	1976	
"Sail Away"	Tom Scholz	Life, Love & Hope	2013	
"Smokin'"	Tom Scholz; Brad Delp	Boston	1976	
"Someday"	Tom Scholz	Life, Love & Hope	2013	
"Someone"	Tom Scholz	Corporate America	2002	
"Something About You"	Tom Scholz	Boston	1976	
"The Star-Spangled Banner/4th of July Reprise"	Tom Scholz; John Stafford Smith; F.S. Key	Greatest Hits	1997	
"Stare Out Your Window"	Anton Cosmo	Corporate America	2002	
"Surrender to Me"	Tom Scholz; David Sikes; Bobby Laquidara	Walk On	1994	
"Te Quiero Mia"	Tom Scholz	Life, Love & Hope (LP bonus track)	2013	
"Tell Me"	Tom Scholz	Greatest Hits	1997	
"To Be a Man"	Tom Scholz	Third Stage	1986	
"Turn It Off"	Anton Cosmo	Corporate America	2002	
"Used to Bad News"	Brad Delp	Don't Look Back	1978	
"Walk On"	Tom Scholz; David Sikes; Brad Delp	Walk On	1994	
"Walk On (Some More)"	Tom Scholz; David Sikes; Brad Delp	Walk On	1994	
"Walkin' at Night"	Tom Scholz	Walk On	1994	
"The Way You Look Tonight"	Tom Scholz	Life, Love & Hope	2013	
"We Can Make It"	Tom Scholz; David Sikes; Bob Cedro	Walk On	1994	
"We're Ready"	Tom Scholz	Third Stage	1986	
"What's Your Name"	Tom Scholz	Walk On	1994	
"With Me"	Kimberley Dahme	Corporate America	2002	
"You Gave Up on Love" (Note: A reworked version, titled "You Gave Up on Love (2.0)", appears on Life, Love & Hope (2013).)	Tom Scholz	Corporate America	2002	
