= Boston discography =

Cataloging of published recordings by Boston

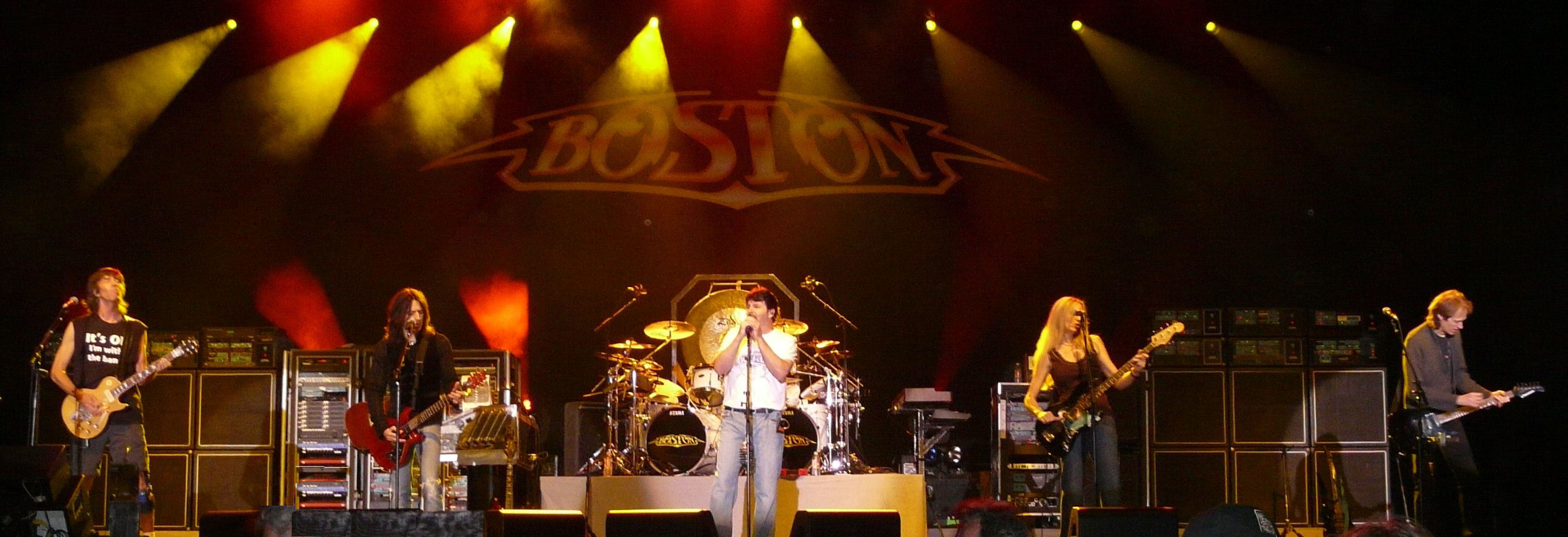
- Boston performing in 2008
- Studio albums: 6
- Live albums: 1
- Compilation albums: 2
- Singles: 16
- Music videos: 4

Boston is an American rock band from namesake Boston, Massachusetts, that had its most notable successes during the 1970s and '80s. Boston has released six studio albums, one compilation album, 16 singles and four music videos. Their self-titled debut album was released in 1976 on Epic Records. Helped by the singles "More Than a Feeling", "Foreplay/Long Time", and "Peace of Mind", the album peaked at number three on the Billboard chart and remained on the chart for 132 weeks. It went platinum 17 times in the United States and was the best-selling debut album in history. "More Than a Feeling" peaked at number five on the Billboard Hot 100.

The band's second album, Don't Look Back, was released in 1978. It peaked at number one on the charts in both the US and Canada, and it went seven times platinum in the US and four times platinum in Canada. Its title track peaked at number four on the Billboard Hot 100.

After an eight-year hiatus due in part to legal problems, Boston's next album, Third Stage, was released by MCA Records in 1986. The album peaked at number one in both the US and in Canada. It went four times platinum in the US and three times platinum in Canada. The single "Amanda" also peaked at number one in both countries.

Walk On, their fourth studio album, was released in 1994. It peaked at number seven in the US and at number 10 in Canada and went platinum in both countries. A compilation album titled Greatest Hits was released in 1997 and went platinum twice.

Boston's fifth studio album, Corporate America, was released in 2002 by Artemis Records. Overall, the band have sold over 31 million albums in the US.

Boston's sixth studio album, Life, Love & Hope was released in December 2013. A world tour followed in 2014.

== Albums ==
=== Studio albums ===
Title	Album details	Peak chart positions										Certifications (sales threshold)
Title	Album details	US	AUS	CAN	GER	NLD	NZ	NOR	SWE	SWI	UK	Certifications (sales threshold)
Boston	Released: August 25, 1976; Label: Epic	3	16	7	4	11	16	—	26	—	11	US: Diamond (17× Platinum); CAN: Diamond; NZ: Platinum; UK: Gold
Don't Look Back	Released: August 15, 1978; Label: Epic	1	8	1	10	10	17	9	8	—	9	US: 7× Platinum; CAN: 4× Platinum; UK: Silver
Third Stage	Released: September 24, 1986; Label: MCA	1	35	1	25	15	—	—	23	13	37	US: 4× Platinum; CAN: 3× Platinum
Walk On	Released: June 7, 1994; Label: MCA	7	—	10	40	25	—	—	16	16	56	US: Platinum; CAN: Platinum; JP: Gold
Corporate America	Released: November 5, 2002; Label: Artemis	42	—	—	—	—	—	—	—	—	—	
Life, Love & Hope	Released: December 3, 2013; Label: Frontiers	37	—	—	—	93	—	—	—	74	—	
"—" denotes releases that did not chart.

=== Live albums ===
Title	Album details
1976 Live In Cleveland	Released: 20 May 2015; digital download; Label: Autarc Media GmbH

=== Compilation albums ===
Title	Album details	Peak positions		Certifications (sales threshold)
Title	Album details	US	CAN	Certifications (sales threshold)
Greatest Hits	Released: June 3, 1997; Label: Epic	47	61	JP: Gold; UK: Gold; US: 2× Platinum
Rock and Roll Band	Released: 1998; Label: Sony	—	—	

== Singles ==
Title	Year	Peak chart positions										Certifications (sales threshold)	Album
Title	Year	US	US Main.	AUS	CAN	GER	NLD	NZ	NOR	SWI	UK	Certifications (sales threshold)	Album
"More Than a Feeling"	1976	5	x	11	4	15	13	15	—	9	22	US: Gold; NZ: 5× Platinum; UK: 2× Platinum	Boston
"Long Time"	1977	22	x	—	9	39	—	—	—	—	—		Boston
"Peace of Mind"	1977	38	x	—	41	—	Tip	—	—	—	—		Boston
"Don't Look Back"	1978	4	x	51	6	—	14	—	—	—	43		Don't Look Back
"A Man I'll Never Be"	1978	31	x	—	27	—	—	—	—	—	—		Don't Look Back
"Feelin' Satisfied"	1979	46	x	—	84	—	—	—	—	—	—		Don't Look Back
"Amanda"	1986	1	1	25	1	46	22	32	10	12	84	CAN: Gold	Third Stage
"Cool the Engines" [airplay]	1986	—	4	—	—	—	—	—	—	—	—		Third Stage
"We're Ready"	1986	9	2	—	25	—	—	—	—	—	—		Third Stage
"Can'tcha Say (You Believe in Me)/ Still in Love"	1987	20	7	—	88	—	—	—	—	—	82		Third Stage
"Hollyann"	1987	—	—	—	—	—	—	—	—	—	—		Third Stage
"I Need Your Love"	1994	51	4	—	17	—	—	—	—	—	100		Walk On
"What's Your Name"	1994	—	—	—	—	—	—	—	—	—	—		Walk On
"Livin' for You"	1994	—	—	—	—	—	—	—	—	—	—		Walk On
"Walk On" [promo]	1994	—	14	—	—	—	—	—	—	—	—		Walk On
"God Rest Ye Merry Gentlemen"*	2002	—	—	—	—	—	—	—	—	—	—		Non-Album single
"God Rest Ye Metal Gentlemen"*	2013	—	—	—	—	—	—	—	—	—	—		Non-Album single
"—" denotes releases that did not chart. "x" denotes the chart did not exist at the time.

- "Higher Power" reached #17 on the Billboard Heritage Rock Chart in 1997.
- "God Rest Ye Merry Gentlemen" is/was a free limited downloadable cover.
- "God Rest Ye Metal Gentlemen" is slightly different edit of "God Rest Ye Merry Gentlemen" for iTunes.
