= List of Boston band members =

List of former and current members for the American rock band Boston

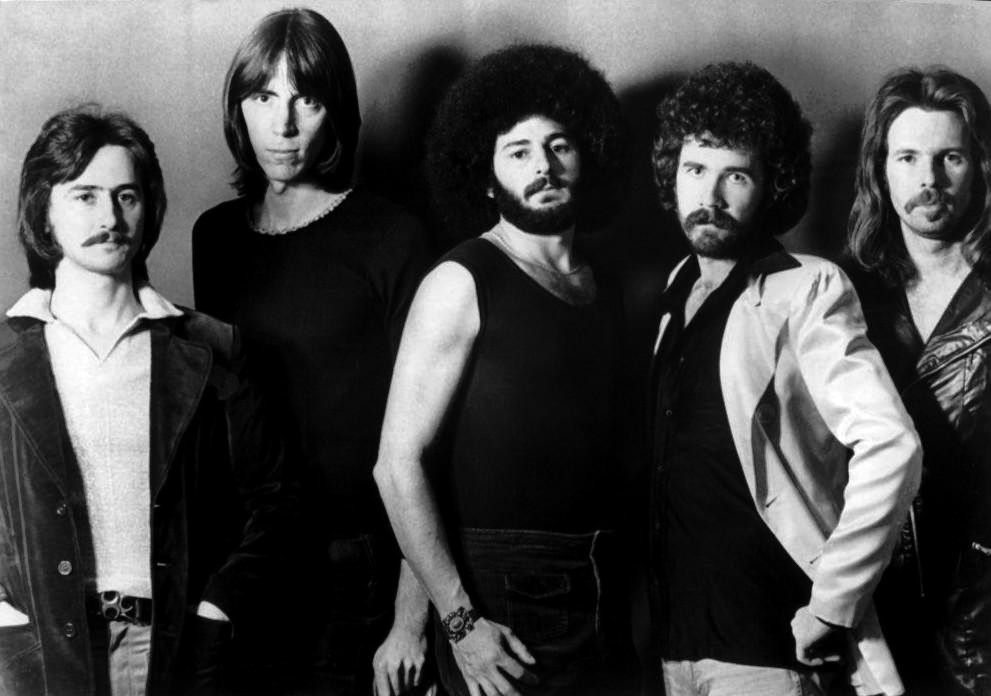
(from left to right) Barry Goudreau, Tom Scholz, Sib Hashian, Brad Delp, and Fran Sheehan

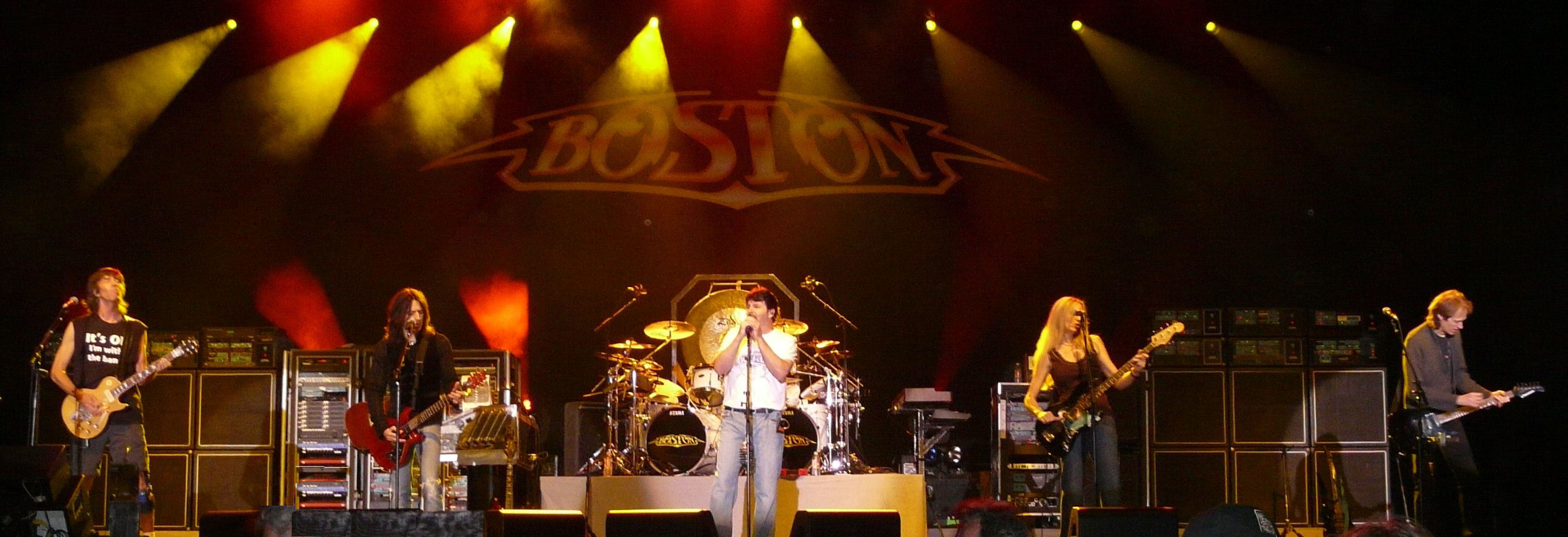
(from left to right) Tom Scholz, Michael Sweet, Jeff Neal (on drums), Tommy DeCarlo, Kimberley Dahme, and Gary Pihl

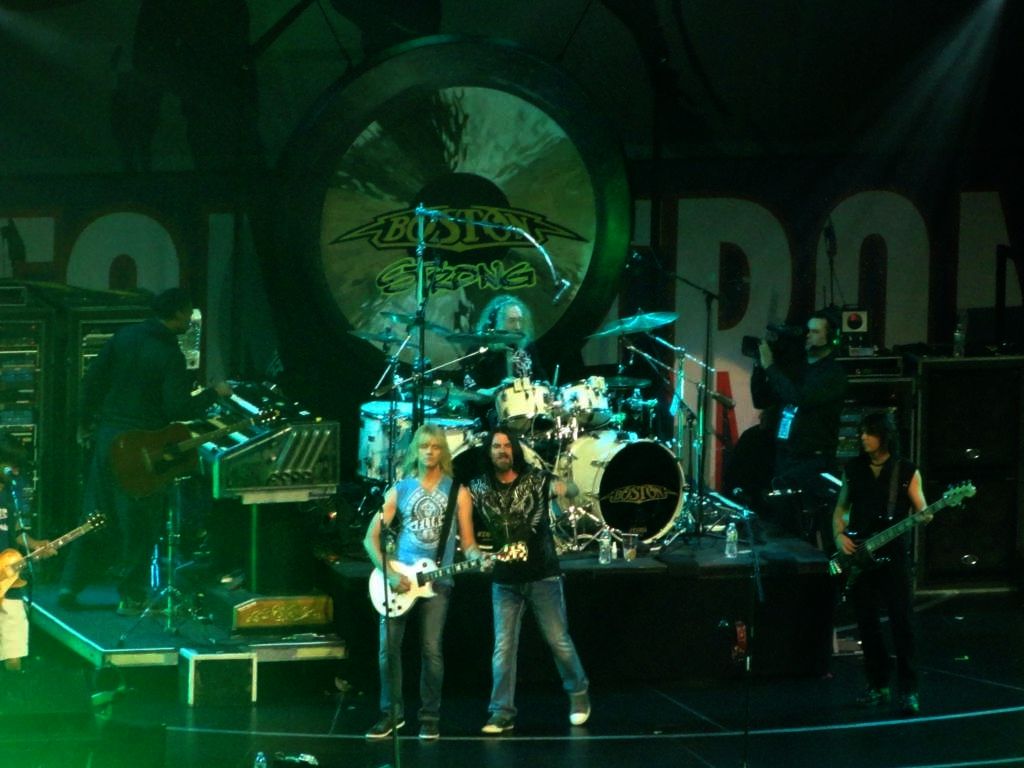
(from left to right) Tom Scholz (off picture), Gary Pihl, David Victor, Tommy DeCarlo, Curly Smith (on drums), and Tracy Ferrie

Three lineups of Boston in 1977, 2008 and 2013.

Boston is an American rock band formed in 1975 in Boston, Massachusetts, by multi-instrumentalist Tom Scholz, who was joined by vocalist Brad Delp, guitarist Barry Goudreau, bassist Fran Sheehan and drummer Jim Masdea (who was soon replaced by Sib Hashian). The band has since gone under various line-up changes with Scholz as the band's only continuous member.

== History ==
Tom Scholz first started writing music in 1969 while he was attending Massachusetts Institute of Technology (MIT), where he wrote an instrumental song, "Foreplay". While attending MIT, Scholz joined the band Freehold, where he met guitarist Barry Goudreau and drummer Jim Masdea, who would later become members of Boston. Vocalist Brad Delp was added to the collective in 1970. After graduating with a master's degree, Scholz worked for Polaroid, using his salary to build a recording studio in his basement and to finance demonstration tapes recorded in professional recording studios.

In 1973 Scholz formed the band Mother's Milk with Delp, Goudreau, and Masdea. That group disbanded by 1974, but Scholz subsequently worked with Masdea and Delp to produce six new demos, including "More Than a Feeling", "Peace of Mind", "Rock and Roll Band", "Something About You" (then entitled "Life Isn't Easy"), "Hitch a Ride" (then entitled "San Francisco Day"), and "Don't Be Afraid". Scholz stated they finished four of the six by the end of 1974, and they finished "More Than a Feeling" and "Something About You" in 1975. Scholz played all the instruments on the demos, except for the drums, which were played by Masdea, and used self-designed pedals to create the desired guitar sounds.

This final demo tape attracted the attention of promoters Paul Ahern and Charlie McKenzie. Masdea left the band around this time. The duo recruited Goudreau on guitar, bassist Fran Sheehan, and drummer Sib Hashian to create a performing unit that could replicate Scholz's richly layered recordings on stage. Their debut album, Boston, released on August 25, 1976, ranks as one of the best-selling debut albums in U.S. history with over 17 million copies sold. Scholz completed the second Boston album two years after the debut album's release. The second album, Don't Look Back, was released by Epic in August 1978.

In late 1979, Scholz got in a dispute with the band's manager, Paul Ahern, over song ownership. Delayed by the dispute, Scholz suggested that in the meantime, the individual members should work on whatever other projects they might be considering. Goudreau left the band in 1981 and formed Orion the Hunter.

While Scholz and Delp were recording new material for the third Boston album, CBS filed a $60 million lawsuit against Scholz, alleging breach of contract for failing to deliver a new Boston album on time. The legal trouble slowed progress toward the completion of the next album, which took six years to record and produce. Joining Scholz in the album's development again were Delp and Jim Masdea. In 1985, guitarist Gary Pihl left Sammy Hagar's touring band to work with Scholz as both a musician and an SR&D executive.

Despite the adversity, progress continued to be made on the third Boston album. A tape of one of the songs, "Amanda", leaked out of the studio in 1984. The song became the lead single when Third Stage was finally released on September 23, 1986. The group headed off on tour to promote Third Stage in 1987 and 1988. Third Stage was played in sequence in its entirety during the shows, with expanded arrangements of some cuts. Boston opened with "Rock and Roll Band" and brought back the original drummer, Jim Masdea, to play drums for this and a few more songs. For the tour, the group was joined by Doug Huffman and David Sikes, both of whom stayed with the band into the mid-1990s.

By spring 1990, Scholz was back in the studio working on the band's fourth studio album. Later that year, Delp told Scholz he wanted to concentrate on other projects, and might not be available for some time. With Delp's departure, Scholz was then the last remaining original member. Before he left, Delp co-wrote with Scholz and David Sikes the song "Walk On", which eventually became the title track of the new album.

Delp subsequently joined Barry Goudreau's new band, RTZ. Scholz eventually replaced him with vocalist Fran Cosmo, who had been in Goudreau's previous band Orion the Hunter. For the second album in a row, and for the second time in a decade, Scholz's work was delayed by renovations to his studio. In the end, eight years passed between Third Stage and Walk On, which was released in June 1994.

Delp reunited with Boston at the end of 1994. Their first appearance was for two benefit shows at the House of Blues on December 12–13, 1994, in Cambridge. The group, with Delp now back in the band, toured in the summer of 1995 with both Cosmo and Delp combining vocals. By that time drummer Huffman had been replaced by Curly Smith, who was previously with Jo Jo Gunne.

Scholz headed back to the studio in 1998 to begin work on a fifth album, which eventually turned out to be Corporate America. November 2002 marked the release of the album on the independent label Artemis Records. This album featured the largest Boston lineup ever; returning members included Delp and Cosmo on rhythm guitar and lead vocals, Scholz on lead guitar and keyboards, and Gary Pihl on guitar, along with new members Anthony Cosmo on rhythm guitar, Jeff Neal on drums, and Kimberley Dahme on bass, acoustic guitar, and vocals. Dahme, Delp, and Cosmo all contributed lead vocals to the album. The group embarked on a national tour in support of the album in 2003 and 2004.

On March 9, 2007, lead singer Delp died by suicide at his home in Atkinson, New Hampshire. Police found him dead in his master bathroom, along with several notes for whoever would find him. Delp's last concert with Boston was performed at Boston Symphony Hall on November 13, 2006, at a concert honoring Doug Flutie.

A concert in honor of Delp named "Come Together: A Tribute to Brad Delp" occurred on August 19, 2007, at the Bank of America Pavilion in Boston. All of the living members of Boston were invited to perform in the concert. The singers for Boston included Michael Sweet of Stryper, former band member Curly Smith, band member Kimberley Dahme, and a Boston fan from North Carolina named Tommy DeCarlo, who was chosen to sing based on his performances of Boston cover songs on his MySpace page.

In the spring of 2008, Scholz and Sweet introduced a new Boston lineup, which subsequently did a North American summer tour, playing 53 dates in 12 weeks (on a double bill with Styx). Scholz was the only founding member of Boston to play on the tour, although longtime member Gary Pihl was also part of the band, and Dahme and Neal returned on bass and drums, respectively. DeCarlo and Sweet shared lead vocals.

Michael Sweet left the band in August 2011 in order to focus on Stryper. In 2012, guitarist and vocalist David Victor joined the band, beginning in the studio, where he contributed vocals to several tracks on the album in progress.

Scholz and Pihl led the band on a 2012 North American tour, beginning on June 28, 2012, at the Seminole Hard Rock Live arena in Hollywood, Florida and ending on September 8 at the U.S. Cellular Grandstand in Hutchinson, Kansas. Victor and DeCarlo shared lead vocals, with drummer Curly Smith returning for the first time in over a decade, and former Stryper member Tracy Ferrie on bass. Neither Dahme nor Neal played on the tour.

Boston's sixth album, Life, Love & Hope, was released on December 3, 2013, by Frontiers Records; it includes lead vocals from Brad Delp, Tommy DeCarlo, Kimberley Dahme, David Victor, and Tom Scholz. Work on the album had started in 2002. In 2014 Boston embarked on the "Heaven on Earth Tour" spanning the United States and Japan with a lineup including Scholz, Pihl, DeCarlo, Victor and Ferrie. Dahme returned, this time performing rhythm guitar and vocals, and drumming duties were split between Neal and Smith, with Neal handling the first leg of the tour. Victor departed the lineup partway through the tour for unspecified reasons. In his stead, Siobhan Magnus joined the tour as a guest vocalist in July, performing lead vocals on Walk On.

In 2015, Boston launched another tour with a lineup consisting of Scholz, Pihl, DeCarlo, Ferrie and new member Beth Cohen, who performed keyboards, rhythm guitar, and vocals. Cohen had previously recorded with the group on both Corporate America and Life, Love & Hope as a vocalist and flautist. Initially, the lineup was to include former Spock's Beard drummer and vocalist Nick D'Virgilio for its first month of shows, with Neal then returning, but D'Virgilio proved "not the right fit" and Smith rejoined in his place.

This seven-person lineup proved Boston's most stable lineup in some time, touring as well in the summers of 2016 and 2017. The 2016 tour marked the group's 40th anniversary and included shows in Boston's Wang Theatre, their first full performances in their namesake town since 1994.

On March 22, 2017, former drummer Sib Hashian died after collapsing on a Legends of Rock cruise ship.

== Members ==
=== Current ===
Image	Name	Years active	Instruments	Release contributions
	Tom Scholz	1975–present	lead and rhythm guitar; keyboards; bass; drums; backing vocals	all releases
	Gary Pihl	1985–present	lead and rhythm guitar; keyboards; backing vocals	all releases from Third Stage (1986) onwards
	Curly Smith	1994–1997; 2012–2014; 2015–present	drums; percussion; harmonica; backing vocals	Corporate America (2002); Life, Love & Hope (2013)
	Jeff Neal	2002–2012; 2014; 2015–present	drums; percussion; backing vocals	Life, Love & Hope (2013)
	Tracy Ferrie	2012–present	bass guitar; backing vocals	Life, Love & Hope (2013)
	Beth Cohen	2015–present (session 2002 and 2012)	keyboards; guitar; vocals; flute	Corporate America (2002); Life, Love & Hope (2013)

=== Former ===
Image	Name	Years active	Instruments	Release contributions
	Brad Delp	1975–1989; 1994–2007 (his death)	lead vocals; rhythm guitar; keyboards; percussion	all Boston releases to date.
	Jim Masdea	1975; 1983–1988	drums; percussion; keyboards; backing vocals	Boston (1976) one track; Third Stage (1986); Greatest Hits (1997)
	Sib Hashian	1975–1983 (died 2017)	drums; percussion; backing vocals	Boston (1976); Don't Look Back (1978); Third Stage (1986); Greatest Hits (1997)
	Fran Sheehan	1975–1983	bass; occasional backing vocals	Boston (1976); Don't Look Back (1978); Third Stage (1986); Greatest Hits (1997)
	Barry Goudreau	1975–1981	lead and rhythm guitars; backing vocals	Boston (1976); Don't Look Back (1978); Third Stage (1986); Greatest Hits (1997)
	David Sikes	1987–1999	bass; backing vocals; keyboards	Walk On (1994); Greatest Hits (1997)
	Doug Huffman	1987–1994	drums; percussion; keyboards; backing vocals	Walk On (1994); Greatest Hits (1997)
	Fran Cosmo	1993–2006	lead vocals; guitar	Walk On (1994); Greatest Hits (1997); Corporate America (2002)
	Anthony Cosmo (also known as Anton Cosmo)	1997–2006	guitar; backing vocals; songwriter	Corporate America (2002)
	Kimberley Dahme	2001–2012; 2014 (guest appearances)	bass; rhythm guitar; vocals	Corporate America (2002)
	Anthony Citrinite	2001–2002 (temporary)	drums	none – live performances only
	Tom Hambridge	2002 (temporary)	drums	none – live performances only
	Michael Sweet	2008–2011	lead vocals; rhythm guitar	none – live performances only
	Tommy DeCarlo	2008–2026 (until his death)	lead vocals; keyboards; percussion	Life, Love & Hope (2013)
	David Victor	2012–2014	guitar; vocals	Life, Love & Hope (2013)
	Nick D'Virgilio	2015	drums; percussion; backing vocals	none – rehearsals only

== Lineups ==
Period	Members	Releases
January–August 1976	Brad Delp – lead vocals, rhythm guitar, percussion; Tom Scholz – guitar, keyboards, backing vocals; Barry Goudreau – guitar, backing vocals; Fran Sheehan – bass guitar; Jim Masdea – drums	none
August 1976-February 1981	Brad Delp – lead vocals, rhythm guitar, keyboards, percussion; Tom Scholz – guitar, keyboards, backing vocals; Barry Goudreau – guitar, backing vocals; Fran Sheehan – bass guitar; Sib Hashian – drums, percussion, backing vocals	Boston (1976); Don't Look Back (1978)
February 1981-March 1983	Brad Delp – lead vocals, rhythm guitar, percussion; Tom Scholz – lead guitar, keyboards, backing vocals; Fran Sheehan – bass guitar; Sib Hashian – drums, percussion, backing vocals	none
March 1983-April 1985	Brad Delp – lead vocals, rhythm guitar, percussion; Tom Scholz – lead guitar, keyboards, bass guitar, backing vocals; Jim Masdea – drums, percussion, keyboards, backing vocals	none
April 1985-January 1987	Brad Delp – lead vocals, rhythm guitar, percussion; Tom Scholz – guitar, keyboards, bass guitar, backing vocals; Gary Pihl – guitar, backing vocals; Jim Masdea – drums, percussion, keyboards, backing vocals	Third Stage (1986)
January 1987-April 1988	Brad Delp – lead vocals, rhythm guitar, percussion; Tom Scholz – guitar, keyboards, backing vocals; Gary Pihl – guitar, backing vocals; David Sikes – bass guitar, backing vocals; Doug Huffman – keyboards, drums, percussion, backing vocals; Jim Masdea – drums, percussion, keyboards, backing vocals	none
April–September 1988	Brad Delp – lead vocals, rhythm guitar, percussion; Tom Scholz – guitar, keyboards, backing vocals; Gary Pihl – guitar, backing vocals; Jim Masdea – keyboards, backing vocals; David Sikes – bass guitar, backing vocals; Doug Huffman – drums, percussion, backing vocals	none
September 1988-January 1994	Fran Cosmo – lead vocals, rhythm guitar; Tom Scholz – guitar, keyboards, backing vocals; Gary Pihl – guitar, backing vocals; Jim Masdea – keyboards, backing vocals; David Sikes – bass guitar, backing vocals; Doug Huffman – drums, percussion, backing vocals	Walk On (1994)
January 1994-October 1997	Fran Cosmo – co-lead vocals, rhythm guitar; Brad Delp – co-lead vocals, rhythm guitar, percussion; Tom Scholz – guitar, keyboards, backing vocals; Gary Pihl – guitar, backing vocals, keyboards; David Sikes – bass guitar, backing vocals; Curly Smith – drums, percussion, harmonica, backing vocals	none
October 1997-November 2001	Fran Cosmo – co-lead vocals, rhythm guitar; Brad Delp – co-lead vocals, rhythm guitar, percussion; Tom Scholz – guitar, keyboards, backing vocals; Gary Pihl – guitar, backing vocals, keyboards; Anton Cosmo – guitar, backing vocals; David Sikes – bass guitar, backing vocals; Sib Hashian – drums, percussion, backing vocals	none
December 2000-February 2002	Fran Cosmo – co-lead vocals, rhythm guitar; Brad Delp – co-lead vocals, rhythm guitar, percussion; Tom Scholz – guitar, keyboards, backing vocals; Gary Pihl – guitar, backing vocals, keyboards; Anton Cosmo – guitar, backing vocals; Kimberley Dahme – bass guitar, backing vocals; Anthony Citrinite – drums	none
February–July 2002	Fran Cosmo – co-lead vocals, rhythm guitar; Brad Delp – co-lead vocals, rhythm guitar, percussion; Tom Scholz – guitar, keyboards, backing vocals; Gary Pihl – guitar, backing vocals, keyboards; Anton Cosmo – guitar, backing vocals; Kimberley Dahme – bass guitar, backing vocals; Thomas Hambridge – drums	Corporate America (2002)
July 2002-October 2006	Fran Cosmo – co-lead vocals, rhythm guitar; Brad Delp – co-lead vocals, rhythm guitar, percussion; Tom Scholz – guitar, keyboards, backing vocals; Gary Pihl – guitar, backing vocals; Anton Cosmo – guitar, backing vocals; Kimberley Dahme – bass guitar, backing vocals; Jeff Neal – drums, percussion, backing vocals	none
October 2006-March 2007	Brad Delp – lead vocals, rhythm guitar, percussion; Tom Scholz – guitar, keyboards, backing vocals; Gary Pihl – guitar, backing vocals; Kimberley Dahme – bass guitar, backing vocals; Jeff Neal – drums, percussion, backing vocals	none
August-December 2007	Michael Sweet – lead vocals, rhythm guitar; Tom Scholz – guitar, keyboards, backing vocals; Gary Pihl – guitar, backing vocals; Kimberley Dahme – bass guitar, backing vocals; Jeff Neal – drums, percussion, backing vocals	none
January 2008-August 2011	Michael Sweet – co-lead vocals, rhythm guitar; Tommy DeCarlo – co-lead vocals, percussion; Tom Scholz – guitar, keyboards, backing vocals; Gary Pihl – guitar, backing vocals; Kimberley Dahme – bass guitar, backing vocals; Jeff Neal – drums, percussion, backing vocals	none
August 2011-March 2012	Tommy DeCarlo – lead vocals, percussion; Tom Scholz – guitar, keyboards, backing vocals; Gary Pihl – guitar, backing vocals; Kimberley Dahme – bass guitar, backing vocals; Jeff Neal – drums, percussion, backing vocals	
March 2012-September 2015	Tommy DeCarlo – lead vocals, keyboards, percussion; Tom Scholz – guitar, keyboards, backing vocals; Gary Pihl – guitar, backing vocals; David Victor – rhythm guitar, vocals; Tracy Ferrie – bass guitar, backing vocals; Jeff Neal – drums, backing vocals; Curly Smith – harmonica, backing vocals	Life, Love & Hope (2013)
September 2015-July 2017	Tommy DeCarlo – lead vocals, keyboards, percussion; Tom Scholz – guitar, keyboards, backing vocals; Gary Pihl – guitar, backing vocals; Beth Cohen – keyboards, vocals, rhythm guitar; Tracy Ferrie – bass guitar, backing vocals; Jeff Neal – drums, percussion, backing vocals	none
