= Can'tcha Say (You Believe in Me) =

1987 single by Boston

Single by Boston

from the album Third Stage
- B-side: "Cool the Engines"
- Released: February 1987
- Recorded: 1981–1983
- Studio: Hideaway Studios
- Genre: Arena rock
- Length: 3:58
- Label: MCA
- Songwriter: Tom Scholz
- Producer: Tom Scholz

Boston singles chronology
| "We're Ready" (1986) | "Can'tcha Say (You Believe in Me)" (1987) | "Hollyann" (1987) |

Audio
- "Can'tcha Say (You Believe in Me)" on YouTube

"Can'tcha Say (You Believe in Me)", also known as "Can'tcha Say (You Believe in Me)/Still in Love" or "Can'tcha Say" is a song written by Tom Scholz that was released by Boston on their 1986 album Third Stage. It was released as the third single from the album and reached #20 on the Billboard Hot 100, making it their last Top 40 hit in the United States. It also reached #7 on the Billboard Mainstream Rock chart and #27 on the Cashbox chart. In Canada, the song peaked at #88.

== Background ==
Although not released until 1986, Boston recorded "Can'tcha Say (You Believe in Me)" over 1981, 1982 and 1983. The released version seamlessly combines what were originally separate songs. According to the Third Stage liner notes, the song is about a reunion. Scholz used the Rockman amplifier he invented to produce an effect in which the electric guitars sound like violins. "Can'tcha Say (You Believe in Me)" was the first song on which Scholz recorded his guitar part using a Rockman, in conjunction with a ten band equalizer for changing sounds.

== Critical reception ==
Boston Phoenix critic Milo Miles criticizes "Can'tcha Say (You Believe in Me)" as "tedium." He singles out the line "Where there's a will there's a way" as an example of the song's "prosaic, cliched lyrics." However, Billboard regarded the song as one of the "best bets" to follow up on the success of the #1 single from Third Stage, "Amanda." Cash Box praised Scholz' guitar playing and said that Brad Delp's vocals are "stacked to the sky" to give "an overall rock/choir effect." Los Angeles Times critic Steve Pond praises the "persuasive" sound at the climax, which he likens to the sound of "a couple dozen guitars" revving up. Jerry Spangler of the Deseret News praised the song as a ballad that sounds like a "sure-fire winner". Paul Elliott of TeamRock.com rated it Boston's 8th greatest song. Elliott said that this song along with "Still in Love" are "two great AOR songs in one." Philip Booth of the Lakeland Ledger praises the song's "a cappella vocal opening." Tom Alesia of The Wisconsin State Journal regards the song's title as Boston's worst.

Despite its chart success, "Can'tcha Say (You Believe in Me)" was omitted from Boston's 1997 Greatest Hits album, for which the San Antonio Express criticized the package.

== Charts ==
| Chart (1987) | Peak position |
|---|---|
| Canada Top Singles (RPM) | 88 |
| UK Singles (Official Charts) | 82 |
| US Billboard Hot 100 | 20 |
| US Mainstream Rock (Billboard) | 7 |
