= Cool the Engines =

1986 promotional single by Boston

- Cover to 12" promo single

Promotional single by Boston

from the album Third Stage
- B-side: "The Launch"
- Released: 1986
- Recorded: 1981–1982
- Studio: Hideaway Studios
- Length: 4:23
- Label: MCA
- Songwriters: Tom Scholz; Brad Delp; Fran Sheehan
- Producer: Tom Scholz

Boston singles chronology
"Amanda" (1986)	"Cool the Engines" (1986)	"We're Ready" (1986)

"Cool the Engines" is a song written by Tom Scholz, Brad Delp and Fran Sheehan that was originally released on Boston's 1986 album Third Stage. In the US it was also released as a 12" promotional single backed with another song from Third Stage, "The Launch," and as the B-side to the third commercially released single from the album, "Can'tcha Say (You Believe in Me)/Still in Love." It reached #4 on the Billboard Mainstream Rock chart. Billboard also rated it as the #25 Top Rock Track of 1987. It was also included on Boston's 1997 compilation album Greatest Hits.

== Writing and recording ==
"Cool the Engines" was written and recorded during 1981 and 1982. Lead singer Delp described the recording of the song. He noted that often Scholz would write songs for Boston but since he was not the lead singer Delp had to adapt his singing style to Scholz' more keyboard or guitar-oriented arrangements. Scholz also usually had the melody for Delp to sing before completing the lyrics. But for "Cool the Engines" the lyrics were complete and Delp had an idea for how to sing the song, and offered to try it out for Scholz. Scholz liked this first attempt so much that he did not want to re-record it for fear of losing it, even though Delp thought he may be able to improve on it.

In developing "Cool the Engines," Scholz recorded drum tracks and cut up those recordings bar by bar, creating an effect that Musician magazine calls "a kind of analog drum machine that only a seasoned tape splicer would dare attempt," going on to claim that it "worked wonders" on this song. Scholz used the Rockman amplifier he invented to make his electric guitar sound like an "armada of axes." Milo Miles of the Boston Phoenix praises Scholz' guitar playing on the song, stating that his "scaling arpeggios and wallowing (decorously) in the lower register" is superior to the then current work of Scholz' idols, such as Jimmy Page.

The meaning of the lyrics is open to interpretation. Miles claims that it can be interpreted as a plea against nuclear proliferation or to calm down in a tense situation. In the liner notes to Third Stage, Scholz described the song as "a rocket ride at red line. 'If we don't take it easy now, we can kiss it all goodbye.'"

== Critical reception ==
AllMusic critic Vik Iyengar retrospectively claimed that "Cool the Engines" is one of the songs on which Third Stage "works on all cylinders" and "sounds great." Miles praises it as a "steamroller rave-up" that's "another guaranteed radio conquest." Scott Mervis of the Pittsburgh Post-Gazette calls it a "powerful rocker" and a highlight of Third Stage. Daily Press contributor Billy Warden states that the song "sounds like 'Born to Be Wild' bucked off a Harley-Davidson and onto a Saturn-scraping space scooter." Philip Booth of the Lakeland Ledger called it a "recent hit single that sounds more 80-ish than anything else from the hopelessly derivative new album." But Dean Johnson of the Boston Herald claims that it doesn't "hit the peaks of [Boston's] early discs. Jerry Spangler of the Deseret News claimed that examples of Boston's rock 'n' roll style "don't come any better." Classic Rock critic Paul Elliott described it as a "blazing hard rock number." Classic Rock History critic Brian Kachejian rated it as Boston's 10th best song, saying that it's "easily the standout rocking track on [Third Stage], and in our opinion the last great original rock and roll Boston song."

"Cool the Engines" was featured in a 1999 episode of Space Ghost Coast to Coast during a scene in which one of the characters flew the Boston spaceship.

== Charts ==
Chart (1986)	Peak position
US Mainstream Rock (Billboard)	4
