= Anthony Cosmo =

Anthony Cosmo may refer to:

- Anthony Cosmo (lacrosse) (born 1977), Canadian lacrosse player
- Anthony Cosmo, former member of Boston (band), a.k.a. Anton Cosmo
- Tony Cosmo, actor and musician

== See also ==
- List of Boston band members
