= We're Ready =

1986 single by Boston

Single by Boston

from the album Third Stage
- B-side: "The Launch"
- Released: November 1986
- Recorded: 1981
- Studio: Hideaway Studios
- Genre: Hard rock
- Length: 3:58
- Label: MCA
- Songwriter: Tom Scholz
- Producer: Tom Scholz

Boston singles chronology
"Amanda" (1986)	"We're Ready" (1986)	"Can'tcha Say (You Believe in Me)" (1987)

Audio
- "We're Ready" on YouTube

"We're Ready" is a song by American rock band Boston written by founder, lead guitarist and primary songwriter Tom Scholz. It was first released on the band's third studio album Third Stage (1986).

It was released in late November 1986 as the second single from the album, following up on the #1 hit "Amanda." "We're Ready" itself was their last Top 10 hit, reaching #9 on the Billboard Hot 100 and also reached #2 on the Billboard's Hot Mainstream Rock Tracks chart. Billboard also named it as the #24 "Top Rock Track" for 1987, one position ahead of another song from Third Stage, "Cool the Engines." It also reached #12 on the Cashbox chart. In Canada, it reached the Top 25 in RPM magazine's Top Singles chart.

== Lyrics and music ==
Described by New York Times critic Jon Pareles as a "rock ballad", "We're Ready" was written as early as 1981, earlier than the other songs on Third Stage except "Amanda." The song begins softly, with quiet, lightly chorused electric guitar and lead singer Brad Delp sounding like a choir boy, but the song develops into a hard rocker. The song ends with the sound of church bells, which are played by Scholz on electric guitar.

== Critical reception ==
AllMusic critic Vik Iyengar retrospectively claimed that "We're Ready" is one of the songs on which Third Stage "works on all cylinders" and "sounds great." Billboard said that "the band's fluid and forceful style remains a hard rock staple." Cash Box praised the "layered guitars, spatial background vocals and Brad Delp’s stratospheric tenor" and the song's abundance of hooks. Critic Mark Madden of the Pittsburgh Post-Gazette noted that it is a "radio favorite" and one of the "highlights from Third Stage, and described it as "a slightly harder rocker [than "Amanda"] with an exhilarating vocal hook." Daily Press contributor Billy Warden states that the song "introduces the band's whomp to children's choir-styled vocal harmonies, making for good, catchy pop fun." Lakeland Ledger critic Phillip Booth praises the impact of the dual lead guitar work on the song by Scholz and Gary Pihl. Peter B. King of The Pittsburgh Press calls "We're Ready" Third Stage's best tune and praises the song as "a classic example of the invigorating, rocking but melodic music that is Boston's forte." Melissa Ruggieri of the Sun-Sentinel described it as one of Boston's "classic tunes." Jerry Spangler of The Deseret News regards "We're Ready" as one of the best songs in Boston's rock 'n' roll style.

"We're Ready" later appeared on a number of multi-artist compilation albums, such as Time-Life's Sounds of the Eighties: 1987 and Madacy's Best of the 80's. It was also covered on the tribute album Smokin': A Bluegrass Tribute to Boston. However, despite its success "We're Ready" was omitted from Boston's 1997 Greatest Hits album, for which the San Antonio Express criticized the package.

== Charts ==
Chart (1987)	Peak position
Canada Top Singles (RPM)	25
US Billboard Hot 100	9
US Mainstream Rock (Billboard)	2
