= Feelin' Satisfied =

1979 single by Boston

Single by Boston

from the album Don't Look Back
- B-side: "Used to Bad News"
- Released: March 1979
- Recorded: 1977–1978
- Genre: Hard rock
- Length: 4:30
- Label: Epic
- Songwriter: Tom Scholz
- Producer: Tom Scholz

Boston singles chronology
"A Man I'll Never Be" (1978)	"Feelin' Satisfied" (1979)	"Amanda" (1986)

Audio
- "Feelin' Satisfied" on YouTube

"Feelin' Satisfied" is a song by American rock band Boston, released on their 1978 studio album Don't Look Back. The song was written by Tom Scholz and released as a single in 1979. The single peaked at number 46 on the US Billboard Hot 100. It reached number 84 in Canada. It was the band's last release for 7 years, until Third Stage in 1986.

== Critical reception ==
Paul Grein of Billboard described the song as "an affectionate tribute to the power of music." The same magazine later described the song as an "upbeat track which is totally rock 'n' roll," praising the "clear singing" and "fresh sounds." Cash Box said it has "those Boston characteristics that has made the group a platinum act: tight-skin percussion, majestic guitar lines and do-the-job soaring vocals." Cash Box also called it a "fine track." Record World called it "one of [Don't Look Back's] most powerful rockers" and praised the guitar playing, Brad Delp's lead vocal and the "multi -track vocal hook."

Terry Hazlett of The Observer-Reporter described the song as an "innocent little [ditty]" which comes across like a "rock 'n' roll anthem." Pete Bishop of The Pittsburgh Press claimed that it has "an infectious happy feel." But Press & Sun-Bulletin critic Chris Carson described "Feelin' Satisfied" as being "on par with the filler" on Boston's debut album.

== Legacy ==
AXS contributor Bill Craig described the lyrics as being about "the wonders of rock music." Ultimate Classic Rock critic Michael Gallucci described it as a "simple" song that, in common with many Boston songs, "celebrates rock 'n' roll." Gallucci rated it Boston's 8th greatest song, particularly praising the effect from the hand claps during the refrain. Paul Elliott rated it their 7th greatest song, commenting on its "sense of fun" as Scholz lets go of some of his usual control. Elliott described it as a "grooving hard rocker." Classic Rock History critic Brian Kachejian rated it as Boston's 8th best song.

== Charts ==
Chart (1979)	Peak position
Canada Top Singles (RPM)	84
US Billboard Hot 100	46
