= Greatest Hits (Boston album) =

1997 compilation album by Boston

Greatest hits album by Boston
- Released: June 3, 1997
- Genre: Rock
- Length: 75:23
- Label: Epic/Legacy
- Producer: Tom Scholz

Boston chronology
Walk On (1994)	Greatest Hits (1997)	Corporate America (2002)

Professional ratings
Review scores
Source	Rating
AllMusic	4/5 stars

Greatest Hits is a compilation album by American rock band Boston. Released on June 3, 1997, the album features songs originally released on both the Epic and MCA record labels, as well as three previously unreleased recordings ("Tell Me", "Higher Power" and "The Star-Spangled Banner"). Tom Scholz, the band's leader, felt that the album's audio quality was not up to his standards, so a remastered version of the album was released in 2009 with a slightly different track listing. Boston embarked on a tour for this album both times it was released.

The album was certified double Platinum by the RIAA on December 4, 2003, and it has sold 2,234,000 copies in the United States as of August 2014.

The cover features the guitar-shaped spaceship flying low over a planet with turquoise rocks and a turquoise tower in the distance.

== Track listing ==
All tracks are written by Tom Scholz, unless otherwise noted.

1997 original release
No.	Title	Writer(s)	Origin	Length
1.	"Tell Me"		Previously unreleased (1997)	4:04
2.	"Higher Power"	Scholz, David Sikes	Previously unreleased	5:06
3.	"More Than a Feeling"		Boston (1976)	4:45
4.	"Peace of Mind"		Boston	5:05
5.	"Don't Look Back"		Don't Look Back (1978)	5:57
6.	"Cool the Engines"	Scholz, Fran Sheehan, Brad Delp	Third Stage (1986)	4:35
7.	"Livin' for You"		Walk On (1994)	4:55
8.	"Feelin' Satisfied"		Don't Look Back	4:11
9.	"Party"	Scholz, Delp	Don't Look Back	4:08
10.	"Foreplay/Long Time"		Boston	7:48
11.	"Amanda"		Third Stage	4:15
12.	"Rock and Roll Band"		Boston	3:00
13.	"Smokin'"	Scholz, Delp	Boston	4:20
14.	"A Man I'll Never Be"		Don't Look Back	6:32
15.	"The Star-Spangled Banner"/"4th of July Reprise"	Francis Scott Key, John Stafford Smith^{1} / Scholz	Previously unreleased	2:44
16.	"Higher Power (Kalodner Edit)"	Scholz, Sikes	Previously unreleased	3:52

2009 reissue
No.	Title	Writer(s)	Origin	Length
1.	"I Had a Good Time"		Corporate America (2002)	4:16
2.	"Higher Power"	Scholz, Sikes	Greatest Hits (1997)	5:05
3.	"More Than a Feeling"		Boston (1976)	4:45
4.	"Peace of Mind"		Boston	5:01
5.	"Don't Look Back"		Don't Look Back (1978)	6:03
6.	"I Need Your Love"	Scholz, Fred Sampson	Walk On (1994)	5:22
7.	"Cool the Engines"	Scholz, Sheehan, Delp	Third Stage (1986)	4:36
8.	"Party"	Scholz, Delp	Don't Look Back	4:06
9.	"Feelin' Satisfied"		Don't Look Back	4:11
10.	"Foreplay"/"Long Time"		Boston	7:48
11.	"Amanda"		Third Stage	4:18
12.	"Rock and Roll Band"		Boston	3:00
13.	"Smokin'"	Scholz, Delp	Boston	4:23
14.	"A Man I'll Never Be"		Don't Look Back	6:40
15.	"The Star Spangled Banner"/"4th of July Reprise"	Key, Smith^{1} / Scholz	Greatest Hits	2:43

=== Notes ===
1. Boston credits this song to three composers, "F.S. Key", "J.S. Smith", and "T. Scholz". Even though Key wrote the lyrics and Smith the music, and Boston's recording is an instrumental, the common practice is to credit both writers. "4th of July Reprise" is a separate composition by Scholz.

== Personnel ==
- Tom Scholz – lead and rhythm guitars, acoustic guitar, bass, organ, clavinet, grand piano, electric piano, keyboards, percussion (all); drums (Walk On, "Higher Power", "The Star-Spangled Banner/4th of July Reprise", "Tell Me"); vocals ("Higher Power")
- Brad Delp – lead and harmony vocals, acoustic 12-string guitar, rhythm guitar, percussion (Boston, Don't Look Back, Third Stage, "Higher Power", "I Had a Good Time")
- Sib Hashian – drums, percussion (Boston, Don't Look Back, Third Stage)
- Barry Goudreau – lead and rhythm guitars, slide guitar (Boston, Don't Look Back)
- Fran Sheehan – bass, percussion (Boston, Don't Look Back)
- Jim Masdea – drums ("Rock & Roll Band")
- Fran Cosmo – vocals (Walk On, "Higher Power")
- David Sikes – vocals (Walk On, "Tell Me"), bass (Walk On)
- Gary Pihl – guitar (Walk On)
- Doug Huffman – drums (Walk On)
- Curly Smith – harmonica ("Higher Power")

== Charts ==
Chart (1997)	Peak position
Canada Top Albums/CDs (RPM)	61
Japanese Albums (Oricon)	21
UK Rock & Metal Albums (Official Charts)	35
US Billboard 200	47

== Certifications ==
Region	Certification	Certified units/sales
Japan (RIAJ)	Gold	100,000^{^}
United Kingdom (BPI)	Gold	100,000^{‡}
United States (RIAA)	2× Platinum	2,000,000^{^}
^{^} Shipments figures based on certification alone.^{‡} Sales+streaming figures based on certification alone.
