= I Need Your Love (Boston song) =

1994 single by Boston

Single by Boston

from the album Walk On
- Released: May 1994
- Recorded: 1990
- Genre: Hard rock
- Length: 5:33 (album version); 4:05 (single edit)
- Label: MCA
- Songwriters: Tom Scholz; Fred Sampson
- Producer: Tom Scholz

Boston singles chronology
"Hollyann" (1987)	"I Need Your Love" (1994)	"Walk On Medley" (1994)

"I Need Your Love" is a song by the American rock band Boston, released on their 1994 album Walk On. Written by guitarist Tom Scholz and Fred Sampson, it was the lead single from Walk On, and the first single by the group to feature Fran Cosmo on lead vocals.

"I Need Your Love" peaked at No. 51 on the Billboard Hot 100 and, to date, is the last song by the band to make an appearance on that chart.

== Track listing ==
1. "I Need Your Love" – 4:05
2. "We Can Make It" – 5:24
3. "The Launch" – 2:49

== Charts ==
Chart (1994)	Peak position
Canada Top Singles (RPM)	17
UK Singles (Official Charts)	100
US Billboard Hot 100	51
US Mainstream Rock (Billboard)	4
US Cash Box	39
