= Gary Pihl =

American musician (born 1950)

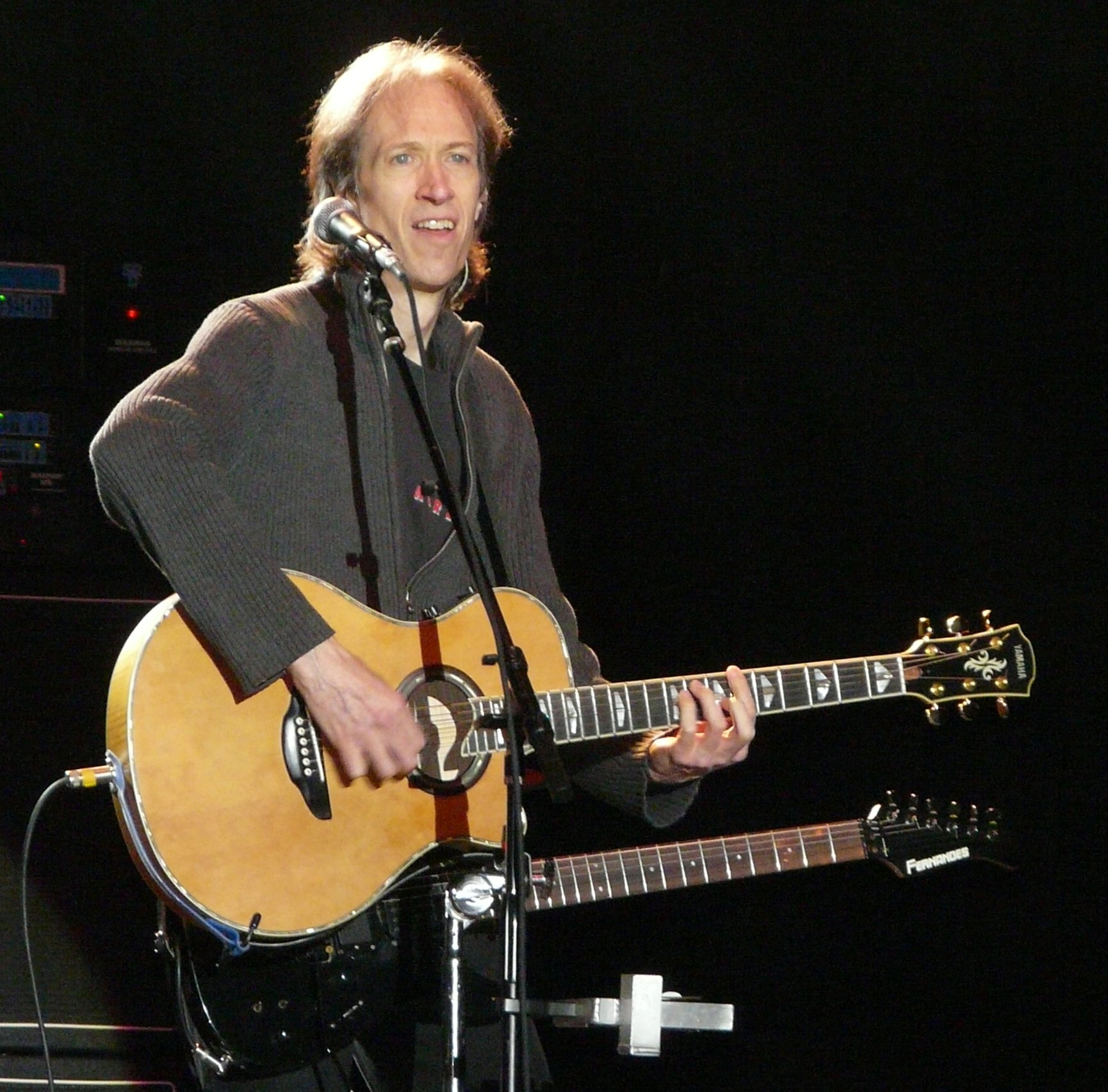
- Gary Pihl performing with Boston in 2008

Background information
- Born: November 21, 1950 (age 75); Chicago, Illinois, U.S.
- Genres: Rock
- Instruments: Guitar, keyboards
- Years active: 1963–present
- Labels: Epic, CBS

Gary O. Pihl (pronounced "peel") (born November 21, 1950) is an American rock musician and guitarist best known for playing with Sammy Hagar and the hard rock band Boston.

== Biography ==
Gary Pihl was born in Chicago, Illinois, where he lived the first 12 years of his life. In 1963 his family relocated to San Mateo, California, where Pihl would become active in music and a participant in a number of local bands. Gary graduated from Hillsdale High School.

At his home recording studio, Pihl worked with the founding members of a band that would eventually be called Night Ranger. They recorded demos for their first and second albums (Dawn Patrol (1982) and Midnight Madness (1983), respectively) at his home studio. Night Ranger was initially called Ranger, but the band found that the name was already being used by another band and changed it prior to the first album release.

He also played with several other bands including Day Blindness, Fox, Crossfire (Steve Jones, Mitchell Froom, David Froom, Phil Marshall with Jeff Dorenfeld as manager; Crossfire also performed with Norman Greenbaum as lead singer for several years), Stark Raving Mad (Gary on lead vocals and guitar, Donovan Stark, Paul Taylor (later of Winger), Jay Causbrook, and David Payne, with Eric Martin of Mr. Big joining after Gary left, among other players), and Alliance. (Note: There have been several different bands named Alliance.)

Crossfire featured an ARP Odyssey and ARP String Ensemble played by Mitchell Froom (who would later become known for the soundtrack to the 1987 film La Bamba and other films while also producing bands in LA). Crossfire's seminal moment was their performance at the Stop the Dam Concert held at Sonoma State College (now Sonoma State University). The concert was to raise awareness and funds to stop the Army Corps of Engineers construction of the Lake Sonoma Dam project in Geyserville's Dry Creek Valley.

Before leaving Stark Raving Mad to join Sammy Hagar, he was known for songs such as "Olga on the Volga".

Sammy Hagar was the opening act at the end of Boston's first tour in 1977 and opened the whole second tour in 1978/79. It was on those tours that Pihl met Tom Scholz. The two of them found out how much they had in common with their extensive home studios and techniques. It set up a lifelong bond and a few years later Tom asked Pihl to join Boston, after Hagar decided to join Van Halen.

After Jeff Dorenfeld became manager for Boston, Pihl made other introductions including Doug Huffman, another drummer from Sebastopol in Sonoma County when Boston needed a replacement, and still later, bassist David Sikes from Fairfield, California, near Sonoma County.

== Discography ==
=== with Day Blindness ===
- Day Blindness (1969)

=== with FOX ===
- San Francisco Session (1970)

=== with Sammy Hagar ===
- Musical Chairs (1977)
- All Night Long (1978)
- Street Machine (1979)
- Danger Zone (1980)
- Loud & Clear (1980)
- Standing Hampton (1981)
- Three Lock Box (1982)
- Live 1980 (1983)
- VOA (1984)

=== with Boston ===
- Third Stage (1986)
- Walk On (1994)
- Greatest Hits (1997)
- Corporate America (2002)
- Life, Love & Hope (2013)

=== with Alliance ===
- Alliance (1997)
- Missing Piece (1999)
- Road To Heaven (2008)

=== with Color Three ===
- Paint By Number (2013)

=== with All 41 ===
- The World's Best Hope (2017)

=== with The Roads ===
- Simple Man (2022)
