= Corporate America =

Studio album by Boston
- Released: November 5, 2002
- Recorded: 1998–2002
- Genres: Hard rock; pop rock
- Length: 44:28
- Label: Artemis
- Producer: Tom Scholz

Boston chronology
Greatest Hits (1997)	Corporate America (2002)	Life, Love & Hope (2013)

Corporate America is the fifth studio album by American hard rock band Boston, released in 2002. It is the first album to feature band members Anton Cosmo and Kimberley Dahme, the last album released in vocalist Brad Delp's lifetime (though he would posthumously appear on the band's following album Life, Love & Hope), the second and final album with vocalist Fran Cosmo, and the only album released by Artemis Records.

Corporate America received mixed reviews, with critics praising the production values but describing the songs as lackluster. It was also a commercial disappointment, failing to chart outside U.S. and Japan. The low sales led to a lawsuit by the band's guitarist Tom Scholz against Artemis. Due to the lawsuit, the album is currently out of print and is not featured on any streaming platforms or other digital music services. A 48-date North American tour was launched on June 6, 2003.

== Recording ==
The title track was released on the Internet before the album's release and went number one on MP3.com's progressive rock charts. The song was released under the pseudonym "Downer's Revenge" in order to test its appeal to a younger demographic. Lyrically atypical song for Boston, according to Scholz, it's the most important track on the album.

"Didn't Mean to Fall in Love" was said to be similar to "More Than a Feeling". "Livin' for You" is a live version of a song that appeared originally on the previous full-length album Walk On (1994). "I Had a Good Time" was included on a 2009 reissue of Greatest Hits, the only track representing the album.

Three songs from the album were included with the band's next studio album Life, Love & Hope (2013): "Didn't Mean to Fall in Love" was remastered, "Someone" was rearranged and re-recorded as "Someone (2.0)", and an original version of "I Had a Good Time", "Te Quiero Mia", was included as a bonus track.

== Reception ==
Professional ratings
Review scores
Source	Rating
AllMusic	3/5 stars
Rolling Stone	1/5 stars

The Deseret News said the Corporate America is a typical Boston album and was not as good as their previous ones. Rolling Stone said the album is full of "overblown prog-rock pomp and hackneyed sentiments". The Vindicator named the album 2002's "most dismal rock record" along with Bon Jovi's Bounce. The Village Voice compared the album stylistically to Def Leppard and called it "sweet-sounding, brawny pop-metal". AllMusic contrasted the album's fresh, energetic sound to "downscale aesthetic of post-punk". In a retrospective, Classic Rock noted the songs as "not memorable enough" and Delp's vocals as "underutilised". Looking back, Scholz called the album "a disaster" and "an experiment that didn’t work". Scholz felt it was a mistake to let other people get more involved in the writing and recording process.

The album charted at #42 on the Billboard 200 and by December 2002 had sold 60,000 copies. In 2003, Scholz sued Artemis for failing to promote the album properly.

== Track listing ==
No.	Title	Writer(s)	Length
1.	"I Had a Good Time"	Tom Scholz	4:15
2.	"Stare Out Your Window"	Anthony Cosmo	3:19
3.	"Corporate America"	Scholz	4:37
4.	"With You"	Kimberley Dahme	3:28
5.	"Someone"	Scholz	4:10
6.	"Turn It Off"	A. Cosmo	4:37
7.	"Cryin'"	A. Cosmo	5:19
8.	"Didn't Mean to Fall in Love"	Scholz, Curly Smith, Janet Minto	5:14
9.	"You Gave Up on Love"	Scholz	4:22
10.	"Livin' for You" (live)	Scholz	5:07

== Personnel ==
Boston

- Tom Scholz – vocals (1, 3, 9), guitars (1, 3, 5, 8, 9), bass (1–5, 8, 9), drums (1, 2, 3, 5, 8, 9), keyboards (3, 5, 7–10), electric guitars (4), organ (6), lead guitar (6, 7, 10), backing vocals (6, 8), arrangements
- Brad Delp – vocals (1, 3, 5, 8), backing vocals (2), harmony vocals (10), acoustic guitar
- Fran Cosmo – vocals (2, 3, 7), lead vocals (6, 10), rhythm guitar (10), arrangements
- Anthony Cosmo – vocals (2), guitars (2, 6), harmony vocals (6), acoustic and rhythm guitar (7), arrangements
- Kimberley Dahme – vocals (3, 4, 9), acoustic guitar (4), harmony vocals (6), arrangements
- Gary Pihl – keyboards (10)

Additional musicians

- Dow Brain – keyboards (2)
- Frank Talarico – keyboards (2), percussion loop (7)
- Sean Tierney – keyboards (7)
- Billy Carman – bass (6, 7)
- David Sikes – bass (10)
- Tom Moonan – drums (6, 7)
- Curly Smith – drums (10)
- Beth Cohen – flute and vocals (9)
- Julia Van Daam – girl voice (1)
- Bill Ryan – radio broadcast voice (3), nightstand clock (5)
- Charlie Farren – vocals (9)

Production

- Tom Scholz – producer, engineer, art direction
- Fran Cosmo – co-producer, engineer
- Anthony Cosmo – co-producer, engineer
- Dietmar Schmidt – live studio session engineer (4)
- Bob Acquaviva – drum track engineer (6, 7)
- Adam Ayan – digital transfers, editing
- Daniel Chase – digital transfers, editing
- Steve Churchyard – digital transfers, editing
- Adrian Hernandez – digital transfers, editing
- Matt Knobel – digital transfers, editing
- Carl Nappa – digital transfers, editing
- Gary Pihl – digital transfers, editing, image editing
- Bill Ryan – digital transfers, editing
- Toby Mountain – mastering
- Alisa Andreola – design
- Darryl Hirschler – front cover artwork
- Darvin Atkeson – back cover artwork
- Ron Pownall – photography
- Kathy Murry – image editing

== Charts ==
Chart (2002)	Peak position
Japanese Albums (Oricon)	29
US Billboard 200	42
US Independent Albums (Billboard)	3

"I Had a Good Time" peaked at #30 on the Billboard Heritage Rock Chart on November 11, 2002.
