= Life, Love & Hope =

Studio album by Boston
- Released: December 3, 2013
- Recorded: 2003–2013
- Genres: Hard rock; pop rock; arena rock
- Length: 42:52
- Label: Frontiers
- Producer: Tom Scholz

Boston chronology
Corporate America (2002)	Life, Love & Hope (2013)

Life, Love & Hope is the sixth studio album by American rock band Boston, released on December 3, 2013, by Frontiers Records, making it their first studio album in eleven years. It is the first album released following the death of Brad Delp in 2007, whose vocals are posthumously featured on the songs "Didn't Mean to Fall in Love", "Sail Away", "Someone", and "Te Quiero Mia", the last of which being a rearrangement of "I Had a Good Time", from Corporate America, and the only album to feature vocalist Tommy DeCarlo before his death in 2026.

== Background ==
Life, Love & Hope follows up the band's 2002 release, Corporate America. Tom Scholz produced Life, Love & Hope and wrote all of the tracks. Kimberley Dahme makes a vocal performance on several songs as well as Brad Delp (who performs on the new song "Sail Away" as well as rearranged songs from Corporate America). This album also features new vocalists such as David Victor, Louis St. August, Tommy DeCarlo, and Jude Nejmanowski. It is also the first Boston album to feature Tom Scholz on a lead vocal ("Love Got Away").

== Style ==
Matt Wardlaw of Ultimate Classic Rock says "‘Life, Love & Hope’ carries remnants of those early days in its sound — which is unmistakable from the moment the soaring harmonies kick in on ‘Heaven on Earth,’ the album's opening track and lead single. It provides a vintage moment on an album that otherwise contains quite a bit of exploration, both musically and sonically — something that we’ve come to expect from Scholz when he's working in the backroom on new Boston music."

== Reception ==
Professional ratings
Aggregate scores
Source	Rating
Metacritic	47/100
Review scores
Source	Rating
AllMusic	2.5/5 stars
Classic Rock	5/10
Evening Standard	4/5 stars
God Is in the TV	1.5/5
Kerrang!	2/5 stars
Q	2/5 stars
Rolling Stone	2.5/5 stars

Upon release, Life, Love & Hope received mixed reviews. Much of the album consisted of already-released material. It earned 47 out of 100 from Metacritic. It received 2.5 stars from AllMusic's reviewers and 3.5 stars from the AllMusic users. AllMusic reviewer Tim Sendra added, "David Victor sounds a lot like Delp and does a fine job filling his shoes on the album's best song, Heaven on Earth". Matthew Wilkening from Ultimate Classic Rock called it "a rather frustrating, confusing affair", continuing on to say that "Heaven on Earth" had "a perfectly infectious chorus and that famous Tom Scholz guitar tone." Rolling Stone writer Chuck Eddy said "Everywhere, Tom Scholz fine-tunes the angelic-choir harmonies and aerosol-guitar crescendos until they're spotlessly, unmistakably Bostonlike". Life, Love & Hope received 2.5 stars from the Rolling Stone reviewers and 3 stars from their users.

=== Commercial performance ===
In its first week of release, the album charted #37 on the Billboard 200, with 16,321 copies sold. However, it exited the chart after three weeks. It also spent three weeks on the Rock Album Sales Chart, peaking at #5. It peaked at #2 on the Billboard Independent Albums Chart during a six-week run. It also spent six weeks on the Billboard Top Current Albums Chart, peaking at #31.

A vinyl double album was produced, limited to 1,000 copies, the release of which was delayed several times and was released in late 2014, a full year after the original release date. However, the release of the vinyl version of Life, Love & Hope did not receive the blessing of Tom Scholz. Scholz, via a post on the band's Facebook page, stated that the “unacceptable vinyl master” was wrecked by “clicks, static and dropouts during many of the quiet segues between the cuts. Our summer tour was in full swing by the time I reviewed it, and there was no possibility of mastering again,” Scholz said. “I made the decision to reject the vinyl master — which meant all the effort to create it would be for nothing. Or so I thought.” Despite intending to scrap the vinyl project completely due to the damaged master pressings, the two-disc vinyl pressing was released on 180g virgin vinyl on December 12, 2014. While the release did not have Scholz's blessing, the gatefolds of the LP do contain a message from Scholz, which reads, "When I started recording this album over ten years ago, I never thought I'd be running mixes for vinyl in 2014!" This suggests that while the master pressing did not have Scholz's blessing, he did intend to publish it eventually. The message goes on to say, "Many of the pieces on this vinyl edition are entirely analogue, mastered directly from mixes made from 24 track to stereo tape, with no digital interface or editing. While this added many weeks to the production time, the natural sound of these tracks could only be accomplished by preserving the analogue waveform from instruments to vinyl."

== Track listing ==
All tracks are written by Tom Scholz, except as noted.

No.	Title	Lead Vocals	Length
1.	"Heaven on Earth" (All instruments, harmony & backing vocals: Tom Scholz)	David Victor with Louis St. August	3:37
2.	"Didn't Mean to Fall in Love" (Remastered version from Corporate America – Written by Scholz, Curly Smith, Janet Minto)	Brad Delp	5:13
3.	"Last Day of School" (Instrumental performed by Tom Scholz.)		2:02
4.	"Sail Away"	Delp, Kimberley Dahme	3:42
5.	"Life Love and Hope"	Tommy DeCarlo	3:57
6.	"If You Were in Love"	Dahme	4:10
7.	"Someday"	DeCarlo and Scholz with Jude Nejmanowski	3:44
8.	"Love Got Away" (All Instruments: Tom Scholz; Harmony Vocals: Tom Scholz, Gary Pihl)	Tom Scholz	4:28
9.	"Someone (2.0)" (Rearranged and re-recorded)	Delp	4:00
10.	"You Gave Up on Love (2.0)" (Rearranged and re-recorded / Flute: Dahme / Harmony Vocals: Beth Cohen)	Dahme, DeCarlo, Scholz	4:05
11.	"Te Quiero Mia" (Best Buy & LP bonus track)	Delp	3:38
12.	"The Way You Look Tonight"	DeCarlo	3:52
13.	"O Canada" (LP bonus track)		1:28
Total length:			47:54

Two special versions of the CD were created for the Japanese market. The first special version included a version of "Someday" with Tom Scholz on lead vocals as a bonus track. A second special version, released on July 23, 2014, included the Scholz-led version of "Someday", the Best Buy bonus track "Te Quiero Mia" (a reworking of "I Had a Good Time" from 2002's Corporate America), the LP bonus tracks "O Canada", and "God Rest Ye Metal Gentlemen" (both of which appear on Side 4 of the vinyl release). The last is a reworking of "God Rest Ye Merry Gentlemen" which had also been (officially) released on vinyl and on iTunes.

== Personnel ==
- Tom Scholz – guitar, bass guitar, keyboards, drums, vocals
- Brad Delp – vocals
- Gary Pihl – vocals, guitar
- Kimberley Dahme – bass guitar, vocals, flute
- Tommy DeCarlo – vocals, keyboards, percussion
- Curly Smith – harmonica
- David Victor – vocals
- Louis St. August – vocals
- Jeff Neal – vocals
- Jude Nejmanowski – vocals
- Beth Cohen – vocals

== Charts ==
Chart (2013)	Peak position
Dutch Albums (Album Top 100)	93
Japanese Albums (Oricon)	20
Swiss Albums (Schweizer Hitparade)	74
UK Independent Albums (Official Charts)	19
US Billboard 200	37
US Independent Albums (Billboard)	2
US Indie Store Album Sales (Billboard)	9
US Top Rock Albums (Billboard)	5
