= Walk On (Boston album) =

Studio album by Boston
- Released: June 7, 1994 (North America and UK); September 7, 2006 (France, Italy and Spain)
- Recorded: November 1990 – December 1993
- Genres: Hard rock; arena rock
- Length: 44:24
- Label: MCA
- Producer: Tom Scholz

Boston chronology
Third Stage (1986)	Walk On (1994)	Greatest Hits (1997)

Professional ratings
Review scores
Source	Rating
AllMusic	2/5 stars
Entertainment Weekly	C+
Music Week	3/5 stars
Rolling Stone	2/5 stars

Walk On is the fourth studio album by the American rock band Boston, released on June 7, 1994, by MCA Records. It is the band's only album to date not to feature vocalist Brad Delp, though he did assist as a songwriter. Vocal duties were handled by Fran Cosmo, making this his first appearance on a Boston album. Delp and Cosmo shared leads during the album's supporting tour and the album's follow-up Corporate America. It is Boston's final album to be released by MCA.

== History ==
After the success of their 1986 album Third Stage, the band began planning a follow-up and writing for Walk On, which began in 1988. Brad Delp, having fulfilled his agreement to finish the recording and tour of Third Stage after quitting the band in 1981 after the firing of original guitarist Barry Goudreau, left the band in 1989 to join Goudreau in forming a new band (named RTZ). Soon after, Fran Cosmo was hired and introduced as the new lead singer. Cosmo had previously worked with Goudreau in the band Orion the Hunter. So, effectively, Scholz and Goudreau swapped vocalists in their musical projects.

Delp returned to Boston to assist in the songwriting, and shared lead vocals on the subsequent Walk On Tour, though he did not sing on the album. Delp and Cosmo also shared leads on Boston's next album Corporate America.

After its release, Walk On peaked at No. 7 on the Billboard 200 and yielded the hit "I Need Your Love." It was certified platinum by the RIAA on September 8, 1994.

The final eight pages of the album's booklet were titled "Walk On — Against Violence and Cruelty", and dedicated to preventing domestic abuse and animal cruelty, providing contact information of numerous organizations, including the National Coalition Against Domestic Violence and the Humane Society. It was noted that Delp himself was a contributor to these causes.

Classic Rock critic Paul Elliott rated "Livin' for You" as Boston's 3rd greatest song of all time and as Boston's greatest ballad.

== Track listing ==
No.	Title	Writer(s)	Length
1.	"I Need Your Love"	Tom Scholz; Fred Sampson	5:33
2.	"Surrender to Me"	David Sikes; Scholz; Bobby Laquidara	5:34
3.	"Livin' for You"	Scholz	4:58
4.	"Walkin' at Night" (instrumental)	Scholz	2:02
5.	"Walk On"	Scholz; Sikes; Brad Delp	2:58
6.	"Get Organ-ized"/"Get Reorgan-ized" (instrumental)	Scholz	4:28
7.	"Walk On (Some More)"	Scholz; Sikes; Delp	2:55
8.	"What's Your Name"	Scholz	4:28
9.	"Magdalene"	Scholz; Galen Toye Foulke; Sikes	5:58
10.	"We Can Make It"	Sikes; Bob Cedro; Scholz	5:30

- Tracks 4, 5, 6 and 7 are all part of one long song ("Walk On Medley"), but were indexed separately on the CD.
- On the LP release, "Get Organ-ized" was split across the two sides of the record, with the portion on Side Two named "Get Reorgan-ized".
- "Magdalene" was originally written by the Pennsylvania band Hybrid Ice.
- A live version of track 3, "Livin for You", was included on the band's next album, Corporate America.

== Personnel ==
=== Boston ===
- Fran Cosmo – lead vocals, guitar
- Tom Scholz – guitar, bass, Yamaha CP-70 electric grand piano, organs, clavinet, drums, handclaps, "keyboard strings, various effects, subsonic bass vocals, narratives"
- Gary Pihl – lead and rhythm guitar, handclaps, effects
- David Sikes – bass, backing vocals
- Doug Huffman – drums

=== Additional personnel ===
- Bob Cedro – rhythm guitar (10), handclaps
- Matt Belyea – handclaps
- Tommy Funderburk – backing vocals
- Michael Shotton – harmony vocals (1, 5)

=== Production ===
- Tom Scholz – producer, engineer, arrangements
- Gary Pihl – associate producer, assistant engineer
- David Sikes – associate producer, assistant engineer
- Ted Jensen – mastering at Sterling Sound (New York, NY)
- Vartan Kurjian – art direction
- Ron Larson – design, back cover illustrations
- Andy Engel – cover art concept
- Michael Bryan – cover illustrations

== Charts ==
Chart (1994)	Peak position
Canada Top Albums/CDs (RPM)	10
Dutch Albums (Album Top 100)	25
Finnish Albums (The Official Finnish Charts)	31
German Albums (Offizielle Top 100)	40
Japanese Albums (Oricon)	9
Scottish Albums (Official Charts)	96
Swedish Albums (Sverigetopplistan)	16
Swiss Albums (Schweizer Hitparade)	16
UK Albums (Official Charts)	56
US Billboard 200	7

== Certifications ==
Region	Certification	Certified units/sales
Canada (Music Canada)	Platinum	100,000^{^}
Japan (RIAJ)	Gold	100,000^{^}
United States (RIAA)	Platinum	1,000,000^{^}
^{^} Shipments figures based on certification alone.
