= Fran Sheehan =

American rock musician (born 1949)

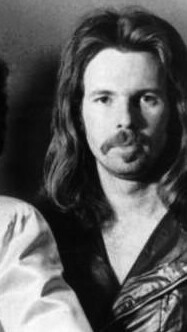

Background information
- Born: Fran Sheehan; March 26, 1949 (age 77); Boston, Massachusetts, United States
- Genres: Rock
- Occupation: Bassist
- Years active: 1963–present
- Label: Epic Records

Fran Sheehan (born March 26, 1949) is an American bassist best known for being an original member of the rock band Boston.

== Life and career ==
Sheehan's father Skip Sheehan was a vaudeville performer, and Fran began performing at the age of five. He studied music at North Shore Community College and the New England Conservatory of Music. He dropped out of school to pursue a professional musical career.

Sheehan was one of three musicians added to the Boston lineup shortly after band leader Tom Scholz and vocalist Brad Delp signed a recording contract with Epic Records in 1976. Sheehan, drummer Sib Hashian and guitarist Barry Goudreau were all long-time friends of Delp's who had worked with the singer in various other bands over the previous few years. The band was an overnight success, but relations between Scholz and the other four band members were strained from the beginning.

Following Goudreau's and Hashian's departure, Sheehan was fired from the band midway through the sessions for Boston's Third Stage album in the early '80s. He received a songwriting credit for "Cool the Engines," however. After leaving Boston, Sheehan (along with two other ex-band members) sued Tom Scholz, before settling out of court.

After leaving Boston, Sheehan formed Fran Sheehan and the All-Star Band, who gigged extensively but never released an album. In 1985, he produced a 4-track demo tape for a then unknown local band called Extreme.

Sheehan stopped playing the bass during the 1990s for several years after he injured his arm and hand in a biking accident. However, he eventually recovered and still appears on stage from time to time. In the meantime, he sang with various bands.

He has made several guest appearances over the years, including Hallelujah with Sammy Hagar and The Waboritas.

In August 2007, Sheehan, along with other previous and current Boston band members, appeared on stage at the Brad Delp Tribute Show held at the Bank of America Pavilion in Boston.

On February 25, 2012, Sheehan played with Boston bandmate Barry Goudreau on stage outdoors for a three-hour benefit concert in Florida at the All Star Jam for the Sydney and Berne Davis Art Center in Fort Myers, Florida.
