= Scholz Research & Development, Inc. =

Music technology company

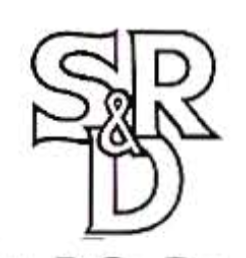
- Type: Private
- Industry: Consumer Electronics
- Founded: 1980
- Founder: Tom Scholz
- Defunct: 1994
- Successor: Dunlop Manufacturing
- Headquarters: Waltham, MA, USA, USA
- Key people: Tom Scholz, Neil A. Miller, Bob Cedro

Scholz Research & Development, Inc. was the name of the company founded by musician and engineer Tom Scholz to design and manufacture music technology products.

Scholz is an MIT-trained engineer who developed many of his skills as a product design engineer working on audio-production equipment at Polaroid in the early 1970s. Originally a keyboard player in his off-time and guitar player from age 21, Scholz built a recording studio for himself in the basement of the rented apartment building where he lived, utilizing many home-built devices including a 4-track recorder and mixer. Demo recordings made in his home studio years later became the debut album of the band Boston and proceeds of his success were used to found a company to further develop and market versions of his inventions. Many of the devices were marketed under the Rockman trademark.

Manufacturing in the 1980s was U.S. based at a facility located in Woburn, Massachusetts.

== History ==
The "Boston Tone" was the result of Scholz's endless experimentation with guitar amplifiers, microphones, equalizers, and other gear. Modified equipment, which was the result of much of this experimentation, inspired some one-of-a-kind products that Scholz felt other guitarists would find useful. Thus, SR&D was founded in 1980.

In 1982, the company designed and developed the Rockman headphone electric guitar amplifier, to simulate full volume amplified guitar to be output through a standard headphone jack, thus allowing musicians to quietly practice through headphones or through the then commonplace home FM stereo receiver.

Later on, SR&D added other signal processing equipment to their product line, notably the Rockmodules, which were professional half-rack effects that modularized individual circuits of the original Rockman. Guitar amplifiers and other gear were also eventually produced to expand the product line.

The Rockman line, which was engineered using analog circuit designs, was perceived as less innovative during the digital effects boom of the early 1990s, eventually putting the company out of business. In 1995, Scholz sold the Rockman line to Dunlop Manufacturing, Inc. which closed SR&D's offices in Massachusetts.

Today, many SR&D products have become highly valued collectibles as evidenced by listings on eBay and Reverb.

== Power Soak ==
The first product released by SR&D was an attenuator, placed inline between a guitar amplifier and one or two guitar speakers. The "Power Soak" limits the volume level while still maintaining the desired overdriven saturated sound of an amplifier operating at full volume. Now commonplace, this was the first such product to achieve widespread market distribution.

The first commercial Power Soak was issued towards the end of 1980 for $89.95.

An updated version of the Power Soak, the Model II, was issued towards the end of 1981. This model has an extra switch on the back to adapt the Power Soak to solid-state amplifiers.

The Power Soak was re-issued one last time in 1992 as a Power Soak model III, lacking the solid-state switch, though the Power Soak III can be used both with solid-state and tube amps. The 1/4" jacks were also moved to the back of the unit.

== Rockman Headphone amplifiers ==
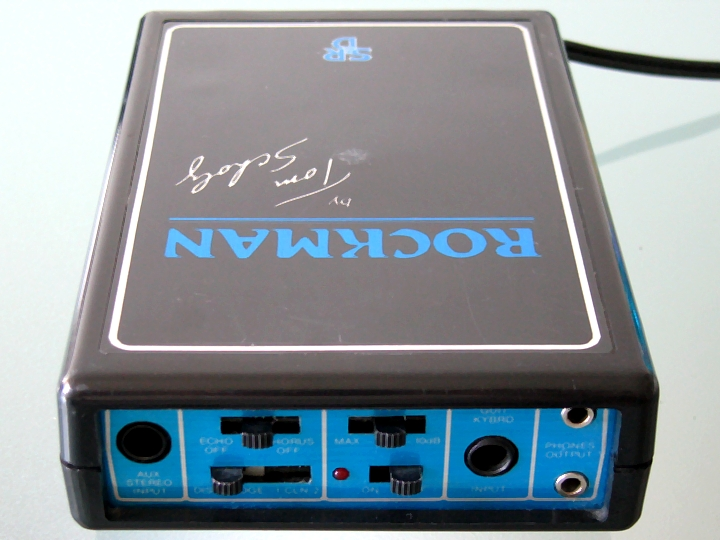
Rockman amplifier

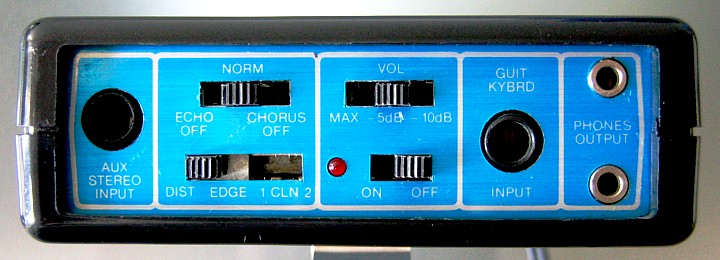
Rockman, front

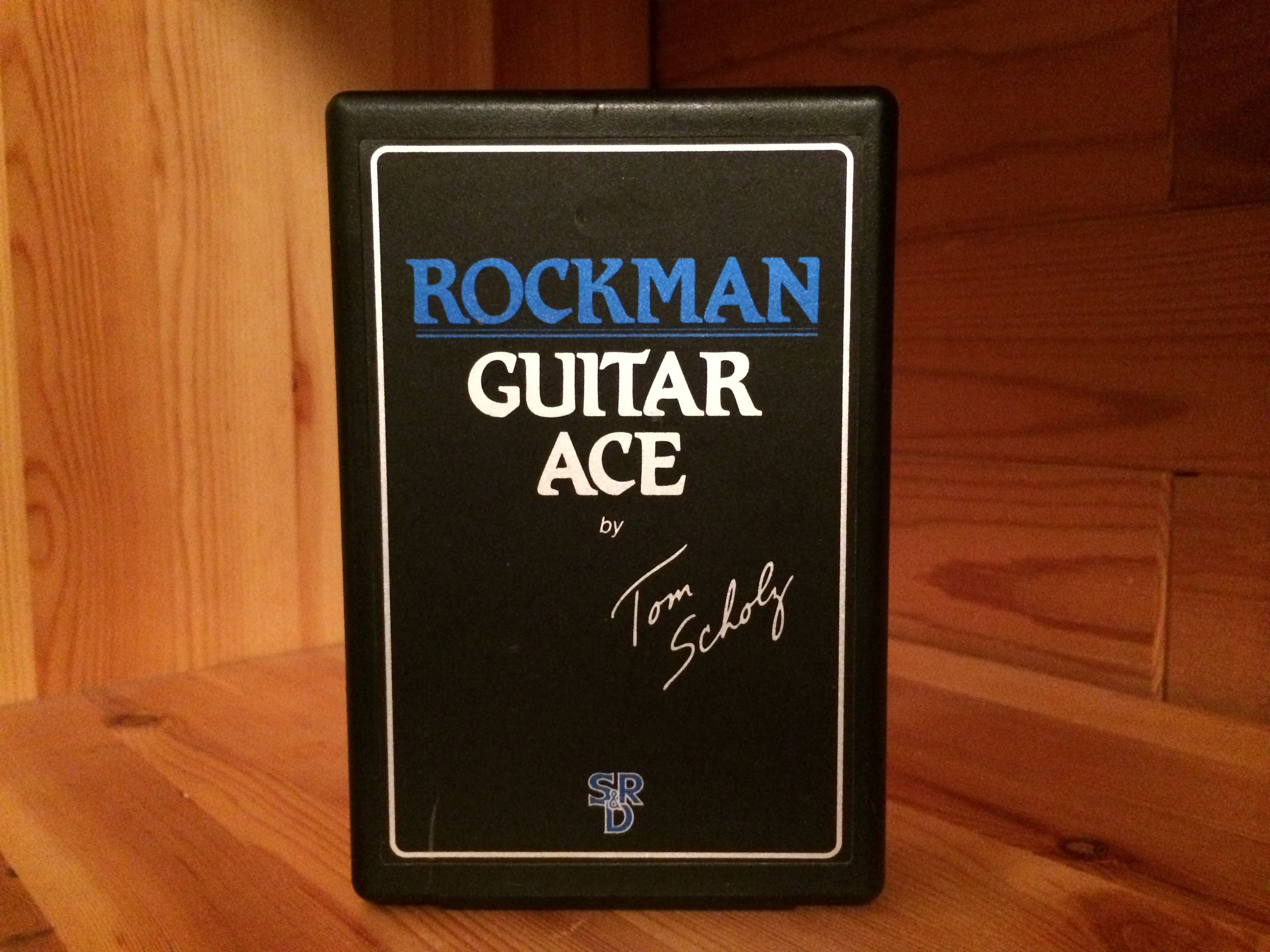
SR&D Guitar Ace

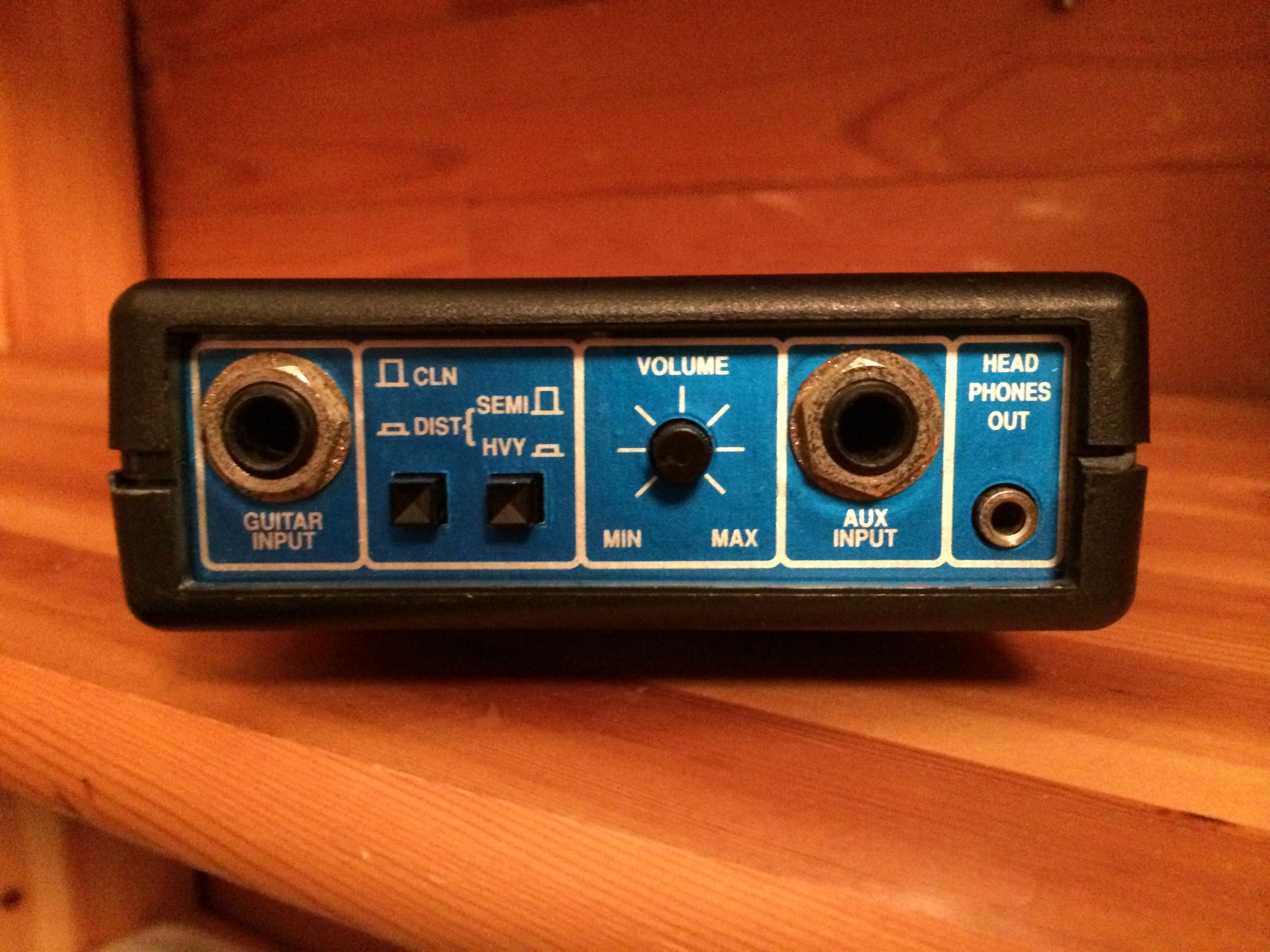
SR&D Guitar Ace controls

The Rockman brand was introduced with SR&D's eponymous battery powered headphone amplifier claiming to replace $10,000 of studio gear. The first generation Rockman combined multiple effects with high quality components and construction in a hip-worn enclosure using a built-in attached belt clip.

- Rockman (Rev.1 and Rev.2)
- Rockman II (Rev.3 and Rev.4)
- Rockman IIB (Rev.5 thru Rev.7)
- Ultralight ($198.95)
- X100 (Rev.8 thru Rev.10) ($319.95 introductory price, $349.95)
- Soloist ($169.95)
- Bass Rockman
- Rockman X100 10th Anniversary ($190)
- Rockman or X100 with Rockmax modification
- Guitar Ace ($99)
- Bass Ace ($99)
- Metal Ace

=== Rockman ===
Released in 1982, the original Rockman (Model I) advertised "custom EQ, heavy sustain, clean/distortion control, 'chamber echo', stereo chorus" and "folding headphones". The Rockman requires eight AA batteries or a "Rockadaptor" power supply adapter which mounts in the battery compartment.

Featuring a built-in compressor, the Rockman offered two clean modes that utilized different equalization settings with "hi power sustain": "CLN 1" can be used for R&B and country, while "CLN 2" is recommended for a wider range of use, including acoustic guitar, vocals and keyboards (electric piano, organ and synthesizer). The "Edge" setting produces what is described as "subtle" distortion, that will clean up when playing softly. The chorus and echo are tied together, both being on when the switch was set to normal. Either chorus or echo can be disabled, but not both at the same time. The output was then processed by an integrated amp simulator to the headphone jack and low level output jack.

The 'Rockman' name has similarity to Sony's 'Walkman' which had been introduced to the US in 1980 as a breakthrough in portable stereophonic electronics. The Rockman even allowed you to plug your Walkman in using its AUX INPUT jack which allowed you to play along with your cassette tapes for a 100% stereo experience.

=== Rockman II ===
Rockman Model II appeared in early 1984 and advertised "quieter, cleaner, better response in distortion, and a brand new EDGE sound". This updated design used quieter Texas Instruments TL072 op amps.

SR&D offered an upgrade from the original Rockman to MODEL II specification and eventually this unit was revised to the MODEL IIB.

=== Rockman Ultralight ===
Production of the Rockman Ultralight began in 1983. It was a lower priced alternative to the Rockman IIB which replaced the original Rockman. It was very similar to the original Rockman but lacks the echo setting. Uniquely, the chorus can be disabled, allowing a dry output from the amplifier simulator. Because the circuit boards are similar the Ultralight can be upgraded to the IIB.

Both the original Rockman and Ultralight models were discontinued in 1984 with the introduction of newer models.

=== X100 ===
A new series of Rockman products was introduced in 1984, which included the X100, Soloist and Bass Rockman headphone amps. These continued to be produced until 1994 when a 10th anniversary X100 was released to commemorate the event. The X100 is very similar to the original Rockman in its feature set, but uses a LED-based "hard clipping" stage in the distortion circuitry.

=== Soloist ===
The Rockman Soloist was positioned as a lower cost Rockman product. It does not have the "Clean 2" voice. It also has different choices for effects, including a setting for chorus and a "stereo" setting that has a fixed 25-millisecond delay. It can be set to "Mono" output, removing all the effects.

=== Bass Rockman ===
The Bass Rockman features clean and distortion modes that include chorus. Dry output is available when the chorus switch is set to "off". There are three EQ presets for what is described as "Fat", "Mid" and "Bright". There is a high frequency clipper, recommended for use with a pick or "snapping" the strings. There is a high frequency compressor and sustain switch, primarily intended for changing the sustain of the bass in different ways.

=== Ace family ===
The Ace family is a much simpler Rockman design that does not have effects and uses a single 9-volt battery or power supply. The Guitar and Bass Ace were first released in 1990 and the Metal Ace was released in 1994. The Guitar Ace and Metal Ace have identical controls, but the Metal Ace is advertised to have a "brighter" sound. The amplifier distortion is toggled using the "cln/dist" button. The character of the distortion can be changed with the "semi/hvy" button. Semi-distortion behaves much like the "edge" setting is described to, in the Rockman and X100 product. The Bass Ace has the most spartan controls, including mid and treble boost buttons.

== Rockmodules ==
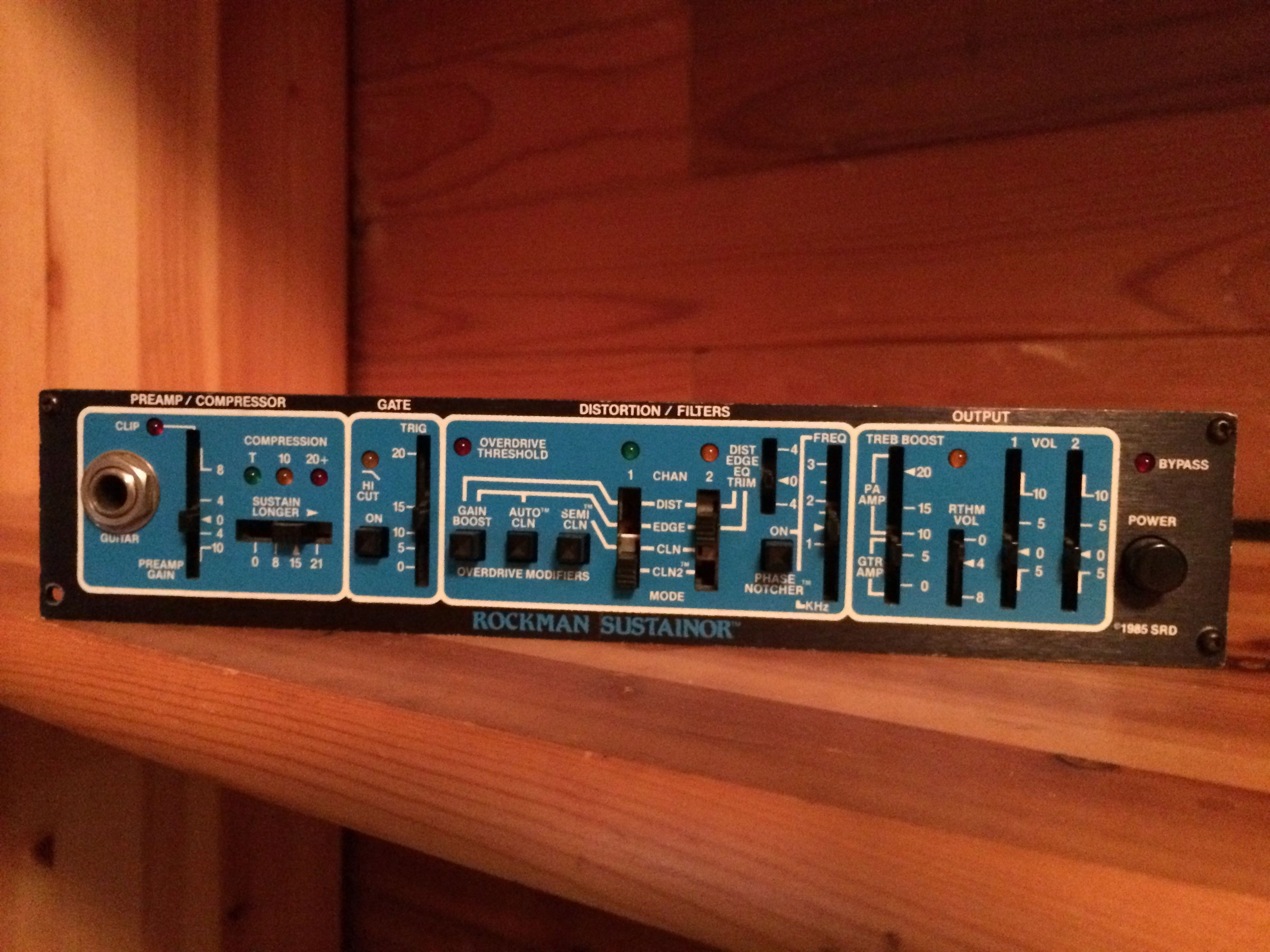
Rockman Sustainor

The Rockmodules are a line of professional-quality, rack-mount guitar effects, introduced in 1986. There are roughly three categories of Rockmodules, the amplifier simulators, the sound processors and the control devices.

=== Amplifier simulators ===
The amplifier simulators include the Sustainor and Distortion Generator. They are the basic building blocks for creating a Rockman system. Systems built from the Sustainor or Distortion Generator are primarily intended for direct connection to a full-range PA system.

The Sustainor was first released in 1986. The Sustainor includes a preamp/compressor, a noise gate, distortion and filters, along with a cabinet simulation. Another feature is the auto-clean circuit that allows controlling the guitar distortion by adjusting the guitar volume knob. The Distortion Generator is a related product that was released in 1987. The Distortion Generator includes compression, distortion and cabinet simulation circuitry. Compared to the Sustainor, the Distortion Generator lacks the noise gate and external loop, but includes a three-band pre-distortion EQ.

=== Sound processors ===
The sound processors include the EQ, Compressor, Smart Gate, Chorus, Echo and Stereo Chorus/Delay. The Stereo Chorus/Delay was released first in 1986. It can be used as either a chorus or delay. The chorus effect can be mono or stereo. The Chorus/Delay is used for doubling, slap-back and reverb-like short echoes. Combining the Stereo Chorus/Delay with a Sustainor provides a complete system for recording guitar. 1987 brought the Instrument EQ, Stereo Echo and Stereo Chorus.

The Instrument EQ was specifically designed for use with the Sustainor and Distortion Generator. The EQ frequencies were tailored for use with musical instruments, putting an emphasis on the mid-range frequencies. Its intended place in a Rockmodule lineup is after the Sustainor or Distortion Generator, but before the chorus and echo effects. It can also be used as a pre-distortion EQ, when placed in the Sustainor effects loop.

The Rockman Stereo Echo is an analog delay. It can be used to provide "slap back" echo when no feedback is used. Increasing the delay time and adding feedback provides standard echo effects. It has stereo inputs, or a mono input if only the left input is used. One possible lineup is to put the Stereo Echo after the Stereo Chorus. The Stereo Chorus was introduced in 1987, following the Stereo Chorus/Delay in the Rockmodule lineup. It is a dedicated analog chorus and adds foot-switchable controls for long-chorus and sweep stop.

The Rockman Guitar Compressor is a professional quality compressor tailored for use with guitars. Since many of the Rockman products include a compressor (Headphone amps, Sustainor, Distortion Generator, XP Series, Acoustic Guitar Pedal and Ultimatum based products), this effect is primarily intended to add compression when it is not provided by other equipment in the signal chain. The Rockman Smart Gate is a dedicated noise gate that builds on the noise gate technology in the Rockman Sustainor.

=== Control devices ===
The control devices include the Midi Octopus and Dual Remote Loop. The Midi Octopus is used for controlling other effects. It could be used with a Midi pedal board, or be controlled by a Midi sequencer. The Dual Remote Loop is used to interface effects and amplifiers that can't controlled by other means.

== XP series ==
The XP series started in 1989 as a rack-mounted programmable preamplifier called the XPR that was intended for direct connection to a full-range PA system. There is a three-band EQ that allows pre-distortion changes to the EQ. The clean signal can also be mixed with the distorted signal. The distortion is followed by a second 5 band EQ. The effects follow, including a stereo chorus that has a programmable sweep speed, along with a reverb.

=== XP 100 combo ===
The release of the XPR in 1989 was complemented by the release of the related XP100. The XP100 is a complete amplifier that packages the XPR pre-amplifier with a 2x50-watt stereo amplifier and 6-inch speakers. The speakers are in a dual enclosure that can be separated.

=== 1991 models ===
1991 brought a number of XP series products, that were all produced in small numbers. A low-noise update to the XPR was released, called the XPRa. Similarly, the XP100a combo was released as a low-noise version of the XP100. Another combo was released in 1991. Instead of 6-inch speakers like the XP100 and XP100a, 12-inch speakers were installed, in a 2x12 single-cabinet configuration. This product was called the XP212. A head version was also produced, called the Rockman Superhead. It is basically a XP100, without the speakers. Due to the small production numbers, the XPRa, XP100a, XP212 and Superhead are extremely difficult to find in the aftermarket.

== Rockman Guitar Monitor ==
The Rockman Guitar Monitor is a guitar stack that can be used with the Rockmodules or XPR. It was introduced in 1991. The components include a Rockman PA500 amplifier (a modified Carver PM175 2x250-watt), up to four linear 3-way cabinets and stage head that provides mounting for the amp, pre-amp and other rack-mount components.

== Studio Series ==
The Studio Series consists of two 19-inch rack-mount systems that were both briefly built in 1991. This includes the Pro Bass Rockman and PGE-2 two-channel programmable equalizer. Only around 20 of the Pro Bass Rockman were made. Just ninety-nine PGE-2's were made.

=== Pro Bass Rockman ===
The Pro Bass includes compression and a 9-band graphic equalizer. A foot-switchable 3-band equalizer can also be used to change the EQ during a performance. It has an onboard stereo chorus, overdrive, tape input, tuner output and headphone output.

=== PGE 2 ===
The PGE 2 is a 1U rack-mount, two-channel, MIDI programmable graphic equalizer. It includes two complete 14 band graphic equalizers and input/output overload indicators. The controls are fully programmable with up to 100 presets.

== Ultimatum ==
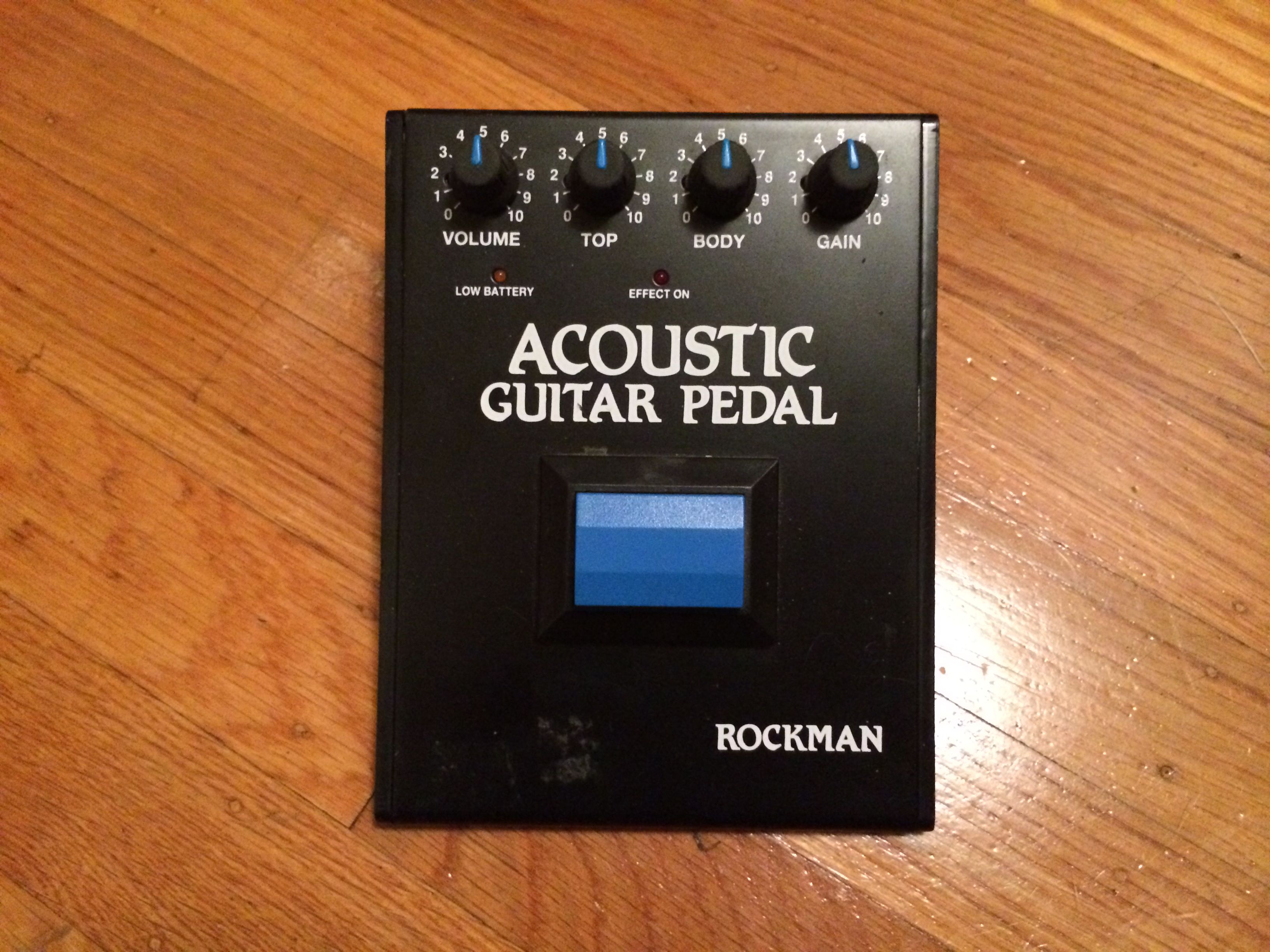
Rockman Acoustic Guitar Pedal

The Ultimatum products are based on two distinct clipping stages in series. The first part of the Ultimatum circuit has a compressor, clipping stage and cabinet simulation. A second clipping stage simulates the saturation of a power section in an overdriven tube amplifier. Both the A12-50 combo and Ultimatum distortion generator are based on this circuit.

=== A12-50 combo ===
The A12-50 combo was released in 1993. It is a two-channel (distortion and clean) 1x12 50-watt mono combo. It lacks the chorus and reverb of the other Rockman products, but provides an effects loop for using external effects. It is probably the most conventional of the Rockman guitar amplifiers.

=== Distortion generator ===
The Ultimatum Distortion Generator was introduced in 1994. It was designed primarily for use as a distortion with a standard guitar amplifier. It can also be used as a pre-amplifier for directly connecting a guitar to a mixing console.

== Final Products ==
=== Acoustic guitar pedal ===
The Acoustic Guitar Pedal was released in 1994, designed for clean guitar work. It is basically a compressor with bass and treble controls. It is intended to make an electric guitar sound more like an acoustic guitar. The Acoustic Guitar Pedal was produced by SR&D and Dunlop. The SR&D version can be identified by its grey button. The Dunlop version has a blue button.

=== Chorus guitar pedal ===
The last SR&D brochure featured a Rockman Stereo Chorus pedal in the same style as the AGP and the Ultimatum. The only controls on the unit were rate and depth. Like many SR&D products it is likely that this existed only as a prototype awaiting a market-driven response. It is unknown if this unit was ever produced or just existed as a graphic on the final brochure.

== Dunlop Releases ==
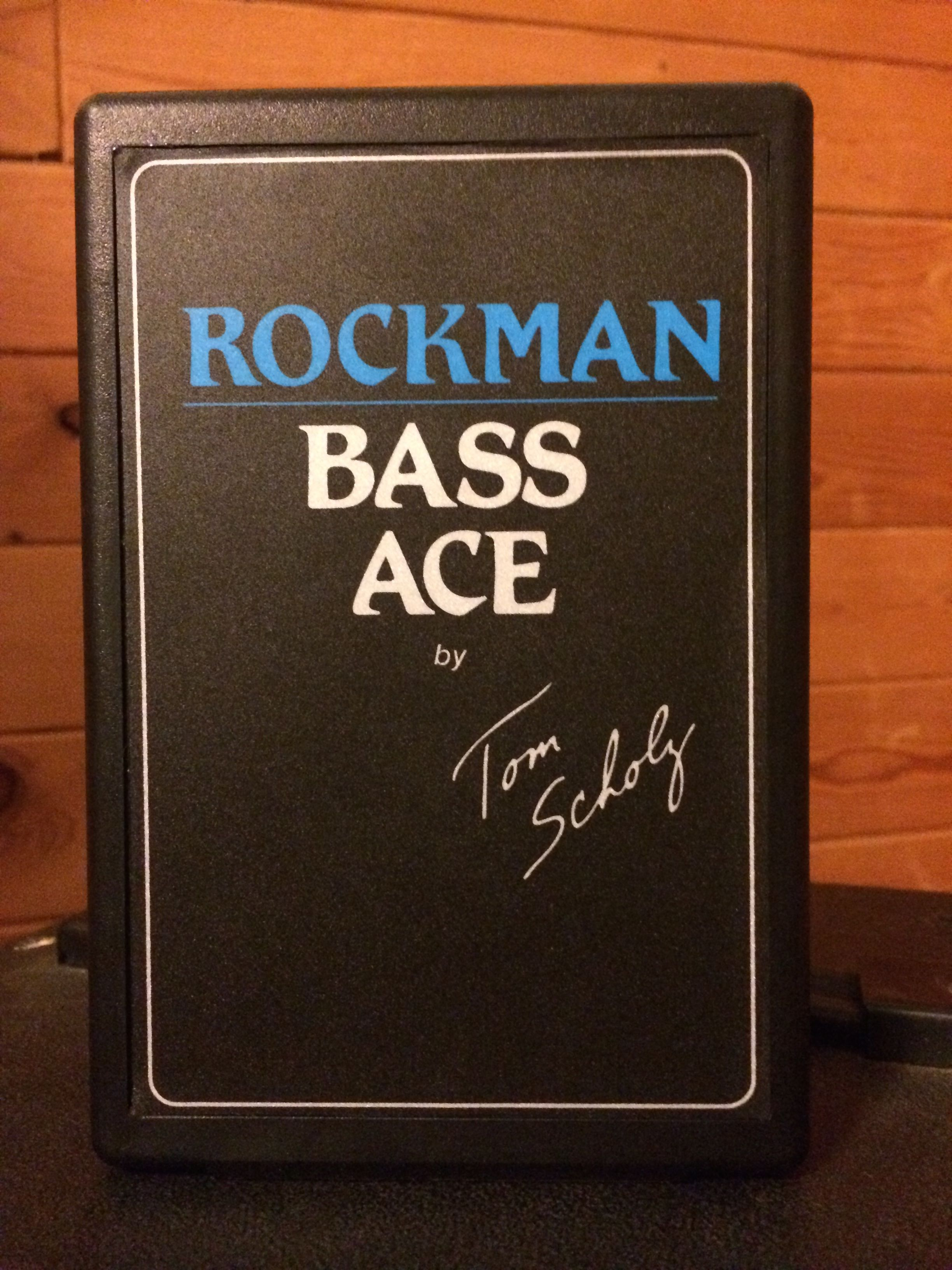
Dunlop Rockman Bass Ace

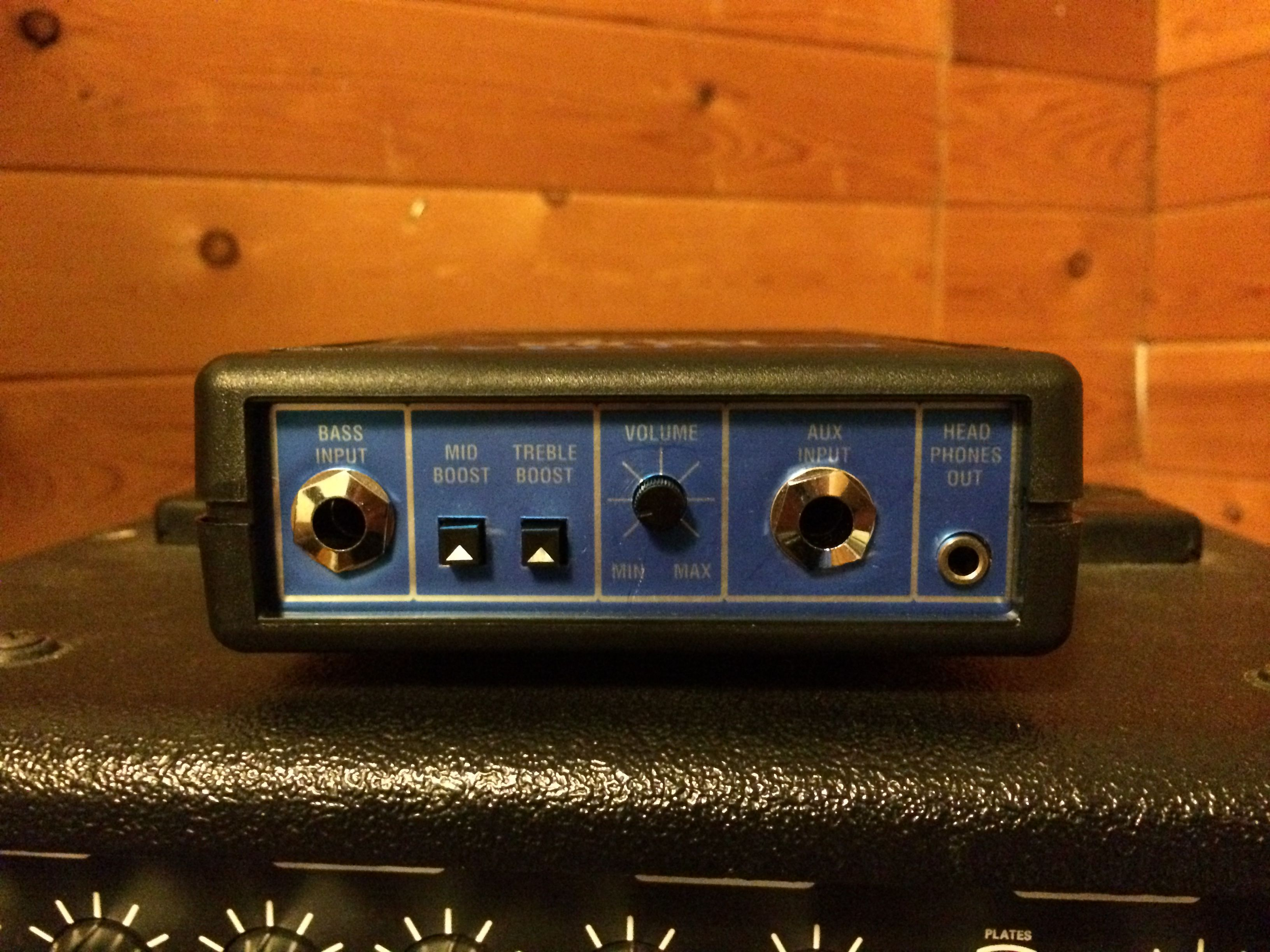
Dunlop Rockman Bass Ace controls

The Rockman designed and sold by SR&D has since been discontinued. Only the Ace family has remained in production and is currently sold by Dunlop.

- Guitar Ace ($89.99)
- Bass Ace ($89.99)
- Metal Ace ($89.99)

== Notable Albums recorded with SR&D products ==
Although it was marketed as a portable headphone amplifier, the Rockman also allowed the guitarist to plug directly into the mixer on the stage or in the studio. This effectively made the Rockman a DI unit for many guitarists.

- Hysteria by Def Leppard (1987)
- Surfing with the Alien by Joe Satriani (1987)
- Killing Is My Business... and Business Is Good! by Megadeth (1985)
