= Third Stage =

Studio album by Boston
- Released: September 24, 1986
- Recorded: 1980–1986
- Studio: Tom Scholz's Hideaway Studio
- Genres: Hard rock; art rock; soft rock; progressive rock
- Length: 36:27
- Label: MCA
- Producer: Tom Scholz

Boston chronology
Don't Look Back (1978)	Third Stage (1986)	Walk On (1994)

Singles from Third Stage
- 1. "Amanda" Released: September 1986; 2. "We're Ready" Released: November 1986; 3. "Can'tcha Say (You Believe in Me)" Released: February 1987; 4. "Hollyann" Released: June 1987

Professional ratings
Review scores
Source	Rating
AllMusic	3/5 stars
Christgau's Record Guide	C
Kerrang!	3/5 stars

Third Stage is the third studio album by the American rock band Boston, released on September 24, 1986, on MCA Records. It is the band's first album on the MCA label, and was recorded at Boston co-founder Tom Scholz's Hideaway Studio over a long, strained, six-year period "between floods and power failures". Considered a comeback album for the band, Scholz, and lead singer Brad Delp, the lyrics invoke themes of maturity, aging, and working through stages in life. Third Stage topped the Billboard 200 albums chart upon release, and its lead single, "Amanda", became a number-one hit on various Top 40 charts and the Billboard Hot 100. The album is certified 4× Platinum in the United States and 3× Platinum in Canada by the RIAA.

== Development ==
After winning a legal battle with Epic Records, Scholz switched Boston to the MCA record label. The album's first track, "Amanda", had been written in 1980 (when Boston began work on the album) and became the band's only #1 single. It reached #1 for two weeks in November 1986. The second Top 10 single, "We're Ready", reached #9. The singles "Cool the Engines" and "Can'tcha Say (You Believe in Me)/Still in Love" also got substantial airplay, with the former reaching #4 on the Billboard Mainstream Rock chart, and the latter peaking at #20 on the Billboard Hot 100 in 1987. "Can'tcha Say" remains Boston's last Top 40 hit.

After only three weeks on the chart, Third Stage reached #1 on the Billboard 200 for four weeks. It is the first CD-formatted album to have been certified gold (500,000 copies) by the RIAA. It was also certified gold in the LP format. In all, the album was certified 4× platinum.

It is the first Boston LP with electronic drum samples, the first to include songs not written by either Scholz or Brad Delp, and the first Boston LP without original members Barry Goudreau and Fran Sheehan (Sib Hashian played drums on three tracks and Sheehan was included in the early recording session and received a writing credit). Jim Masdea plays drums on most of the album. According to Masdea, "the first side, half of it or a little bit more, is all Sib. Then 'The Launch,' 'My Destination' – I played with Tom. And then the second side, that's pretty much all me." It is the first Boston recording to use the Rockman guitar processor, invented by Scholz.

== Track listing ==
All tracks are written by Tom Scholz, except where noted.

Side one
No.	Title	Writer(s)	Length
1.	"Amanda"		4:16
2.	"We're Ready"		3:58
3.	"The Launch" a) "Countdown" b) "Ignition" c) "Third Stage Separation"		2:55
4.	"Cool the Engines"	Tom Scholz; Fran Sheehan; Brad Delp	4:24
5.	"My Destination"		2:19
Total length:			17:52

Side two
No.	Title	Writer(s)	Length
6.	"A New World" (instrumental)	Jim Masdea	0:37
7.	"To Be a Man"		3:30
8.	"I Think I Like It"	Scholz; Jon DeBrigard (credited as John English)	4:06
9.	"Can'tcha Say (You Believe in Me)/Still in Love" (Track length misprinted as 7:14 on CD releases)	Gerry Green; Scholz; Delp	5:13
10.	"Hollyann"		5:09
Total length:			18:35

== Personnel ==
Adapted from Third Stage liner notes.

- Brad Delp – vocals, acoustic guitar, percussion
- Tom Scholz – guitar, bass, grand piano, electric piano, Hammond organ, theater organ, drum editing, "guitar 'violin', rocket ignition, thunderstorms, unidentified flying objects"
- Gary Pihl – co-lead guitar (8)
- Jim Masdea – drums (3, 5–10)
- Sib Hashian – drums (1, 2, 4)

== Production ==
- Tom Scholz – producer, arrangements, engineer, liner notes
- Gragg Lumsford – piano track engineer (9) at Blue Jay Studios (Carlisle, Massachusetts)
- Augustine Antoine – technical support
- Mike Blackmere – technical support
- Bill Clack – technical support
- Del Eilers – technical support
- Neil Miller – technical support
- Gary Pihl – technical support
- Bob Ludwig – mastering at Masterdisk (New York, NY)
- John Salozzo – cover artwork
- Chris Serra – cover concept sleeve drawing
- Richard Ocean – photography
- Ron Pownall – photography

== Charts ==
=== Weekly charts ===
Chart (1986–1987)	Peak position
Australian Albums (Kent Music Report)	35
Canada Top Albums/CDs (RPM)	1
Dutch Albums (Album Top 100)	15
Finnish Albums (The Official Finnish Charts)	30
German Albums (Offizielle Top 100)	25
Italian Albums (Musica e Dischi)	24
Japanese Albums (Oricon)	8
Swedish Albums (Sverigetopplistan)	23
Swiss Albums (Schweizer Hitparade)	13
UK Albums (Official Charts)	37
US Billboard 200	1

=== Year-end charts ===
Chart (1986)	Position
Canada Top Albums/CDs (RPM)	26
Chart (1987)	Position
US Billboard 200	17

== Certifications ==
Region	Certification	Certified units/sales
Canada (Music Canada)	3× Platinum	300,000^{^}
United States (RIAA)	4× Platinum	4,000,000^{^}
^{^} Shipments figures based on certification alone.

== See also ==
- List of number-one albums of 1986 (U.S.)
