= Amanda (Boston song) =

1986 single by Boston

- The sleeve of the "Amanda" single.

Single by Boston

from the album Third Stage
- B-side: "My Destination"
- Released: September 1986
- Recorded: 1980–1981; 1986
- Studio: Hideaway Studios; Blue Jay Recording Studios
- Genre: Soft rock; arena rock
- Length: 4:16
- Label: MCA
- Songwriter: Tom Scholz
- Producer: Tom Scholz

Boston singles chronology
"Feelin' Satisfied" (1979)	"Amanda" (1986)	"We're Ready" (1986)

Audio
- "Amanda" on YouTube

"Amanda" is a power ballad by American rock band Boston written by Tom Scholz. The song was released as the first single from the band's third album, Third Stage, in 1986, six years after it was recorded.

Although the song did not have a promotional music video, "Amanda" became the band's highest-charting single in the United States and Canada. In the United States, the single entered Billboard Hot 100 on September 27, and topped the charts in November 1986 for two consecutive weeks (the band's only number one on the Hot 100), and also reached number one for three consecutive weeks on the Mainstream Rock chart, in October of the same year, while in Canada, the single topped RPM magazine's Top Singles and Adult Contemporary charts.

It was the band's first officially released single since 1978 and their first released by MCA Records. The 12-string guitar parts are played by Scholz.

== Background ==
Guitarist Tom Scholz recorded the demos in 1980, including the guitar solo that would later be featured in "Amanda". Between then and 1981 Scholz had to rework the song to finish it. He stated:

I think all that I had were some drums and some rhythm guitar that I played with an electric guitar instead of the acoustic, just to get through the chord changes and to see how it went. [...] I played that little lead electric part after the second chorus, doing it in a hurry as I was running by, and I decided that it was exactly the way I wanted it. I then had to go back and play all of the other parts and keep everything in exactly the same place to match up with that one track that was not going to change.

"Amanda" was not a real woman. Instead, the name was chosen because it flowed well with the lyrics.

In early 1984 a raw demo of the song was leaked to radio stations via a syndicated satellite feed. Despite the poor audio quality the first new studio Boston song to be heard in six years became the most requested song at AOR (album-oriented rock) stations that played the bootleg. "Amanda" is a relatively rare example of a song that reached number one on the Billboard Hot 100 in or after the 1980s without having a performance music video made for it.

An interview for British television, made while the band was promoting the Third Stage album, does show a couple of minutes of a music video near the end. The band does not appear in that video, which intersperses shots of a model smiling for the camera with special effects footage of the band's spaceship logo flying over the Boston skyline. One shot shows the animated spaceship almost colliding with the John Hancock Tower. Despite being released in that country, the single failed to chart on the UK Singles Chart.

The song was eventually certified gold by the Canadian Recording Industry Association with sales of over 50,000 units.

== Critical reception ==
Cash Box called it a "romantic ballad [that] features [...] Tom Scholz' trademark guitar" and a "pretty and memorable song." Classic Rock critic Paul Elliott rated "Amanda" as Boston's 5th greatest song.

== Charts ==
=== Weekly charts ===
Chart (1986–1987)	Peak position
Australia (Kent Music Report)	25
Canada Retail Singles (The Record)	1
Canada Top Singles (RPM)	1
Canada Adult Contemporary (RPM)	1
Japan (Oricon)	98
Netherlands (Single Top 100)	22
New Zealand (Recorded Music NZ)	32
Norway (VG-lista)	10
South Africa (Springbok Radio)	29
Switzerland (Schweizer Hitparade)	10
UK Singles (Official Charts)	84
US Billboard Hot 100	1
US Adult Contemporary (Billboard)	13
US Mainstream Rock Airplay (Billboard)	1
West Germany (GfK)	46

=== Year-end charts ===
Chart (1986)	Position
Canada Top Singles (RPM)	39
US Billboard Hot 100	50

== Certifications ==
Region	Certification	Certified units/sales
Canada (Music Canada)	Gold	50,000^{^}
^{^} Shipments figures based on certification alone.
