= Brad Delp =

American rock musician (1951–2007)

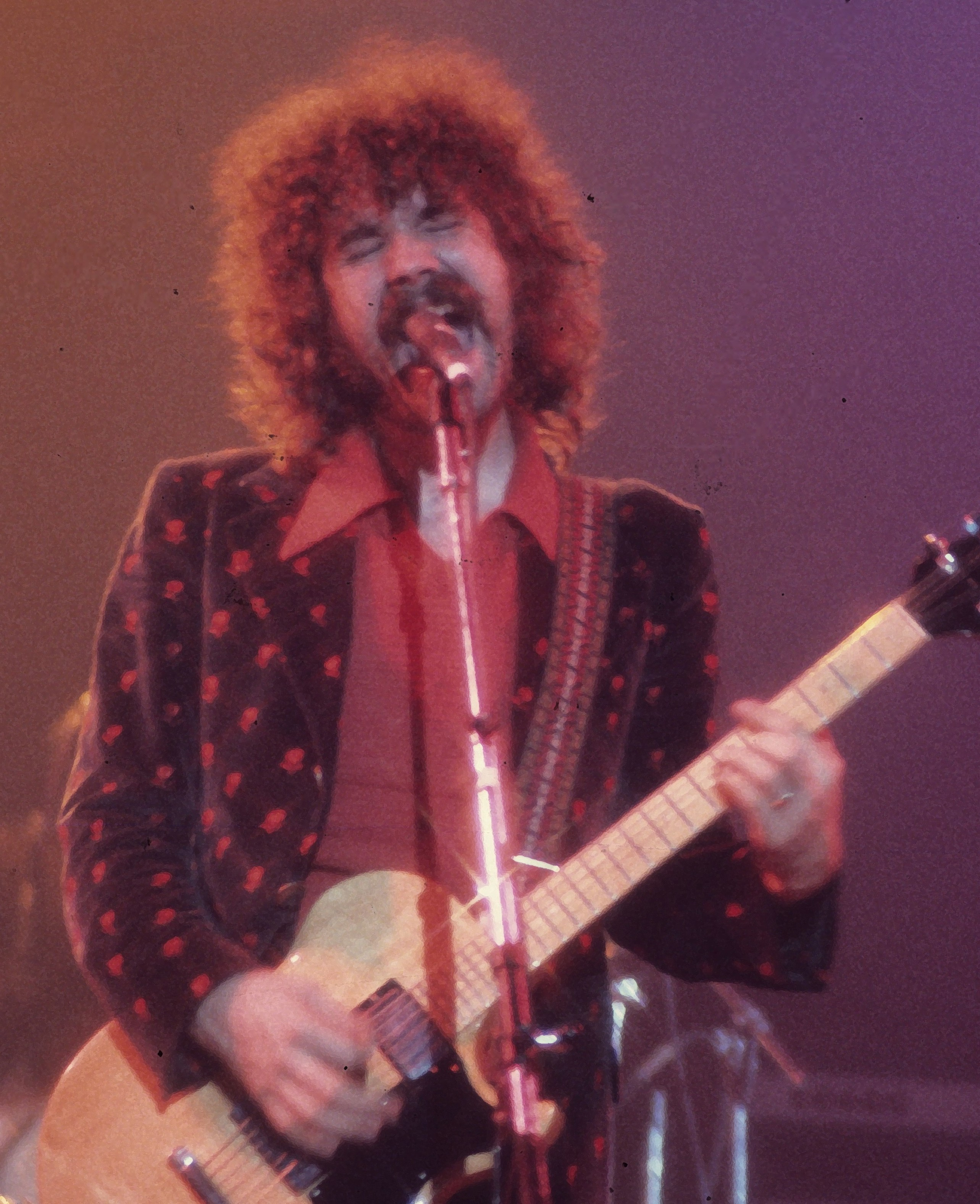
- Delp performing c. 1976

Background information
- Born: Bradley Edward Delp; June 12, 1951; Peabody, Massachusetts, U.S.
- Origin: Danvers, Massachusetts, U.S.
- Died: March 9, 2007 (aged 55) Atkinson, New Hampshire, U.S.
- Genres: Hard rock; arena rock; rock
- Occupations: Singer; musician; songwriter
- Instruments: Vocals; guitar; keyboards; harmonica
- Years active: 1970–2007
- Formerly of: Boston; Barry Goudreau; Orion the Hunter; RTZ; Beatlejuice; Keith Emerson
- Website: braddelpfoundation.org

Bradley Edward Delp (June 12, 1951 – March 9, 2007) was an American singer and musician who was the original lead vocalist of the American rock band Boston. A Massachusetts native, Delp began collaborating with leader Tom Scholz in 1970, and was the band's longtime lead singer across various stints from 1975 until his suicide in 2007. Delp is best known for his lead vocals on the albums Boston (1976), Don't Look Back (1978) and Third Stage (1986). He performed in every Boston concert tour prior to his death. Delp was known for his "unique and soulful singing" and vocal range.

== Early life ==
Delp was born in Peabody, Massachusetts, on June 12, 1951, to French-Canadian immigrant parents and raised in Danvers, Massachusetts.

== Career ==
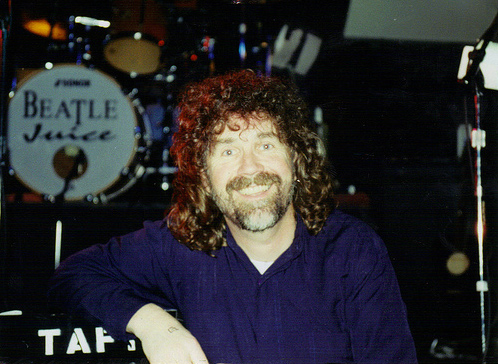
Delp while playing for his band Beatlejuice

In 1969, guitarist Barry Goudreau introduced Delp to Tom Scholz, who was looking for a singer to complete some demo recordings. Eventually Scholz formed the short-lived band Mother's Milk (1973–74), which included Delp and Goudreau. After the band produced a demo, they were signed by Epic Records. Mother's Milk was renamed Boston.

The band's debut album, Boston, was released in August 1976. With over 17 million copies sold, the album ranks as one of the best-selling debut albums in U.S. history. The band was nominated for the Grammy Award for Best New Artist. The album spawned three singles, "More Than a Feeling", "Long Time", and "Peace of Mind", all of which made the Hot 100's top 40. The album peaked at number three on the Billboard 200 and remained on the charts for 132 weeks.

Boston was followed by Don't Look Back (1978), and Third Stage (1986). "Amanda", the lead single from Third Stage, went to number one on the Billboard Hot 100. Subsequent singles "We're Ready" and "Can'tcha Say" reached numbers nine and 20, respectively.

In 1990, Delp stated that he wanted to concentrate on other projects while Scholz concentrated on the legal dispute between Scholz and Paul Ahern, the band's manager at the time. In 1991, Delp and Goudreau formed a band called RTZ. When Scholz called Delp in to record the vocals on Walk On, Delp was already committed to doing a tour with Goudreau/RTZ and was unavailable to record with Scholz. Scholz contacted Fran Cosmo to complete the record. After Walk On was released in 1994 with Fran Cosmo on vocals, Delp and Boston reunited later that year for another major tour. Delp continued to record vocals on several albums and projects, including new tracks for Boston's 1997 Greatest Hits compilation and their 2002 release Corporate America.

From the mid-1990s until his death in 2007, Delp played in a side project, a Beatles tribute band called Beatlejuice. During this time, Delp also co-wrote and recorded with former Boston bandmate Barry Goudreau, and in 2003 released the CD Delp and Goudreau.

On October 16, 2007, several months after Delp's death, Barry Goudreau released a song with Delp on vocals. Entitled "Rockin Away", the song was co-written by Delp and Goudreau and recorded in mid-2006. It is an autobiography of Delp's musical career. The song reached #20 on the U.S. rock charts in January 2008.

== Personal life ==
Delp was married and divorced twice, and had two children by his second wife, Micki. Micki's sister, Connie, subsequently married band member Goudreau. Brad and Micki married in 1980 and divorced in 1996 but remained close until his death.

Delp was a vegetarian for over 40 years, and contributed to a number of charitable causes.

== Death and aftermath ==
Sometime between 11:00 pm on March 8 and 1:20 am on March 9, 2007, Delp died by suicide from carbon monoxide poisoning in his home at 55 Academy Avenue, in Atkinson, New Hampshire. He had been suffering from depression since he was a teenager. The Atkinson police discovered his body on the floor of his master bathroom. Two charcoal grills were found to have been placed in the bathtub and lit, causing the room to fill with smoke. The following day, Boston's website was replaced with a simple black background and white text message: "We've just lost the nicest guy in rock and roll."

A concert known as "Come Together: A Tribute to Brad Delp" occurred on August 19, 2007, at the Bank of America Pavilion in Boston.

The reason for Delp's suicide has been the subject of contradictory news reports and various lawsuits. A series of interviews conducted by the Boston Herald alleged that lingering hard feelings from Boston's disbandment in the 1980s and personal tension between Delp and Scholz drove him to suicide. Scholz denied these claims and filed defamation lawsuits. The court ruled that statements attributing Delp's suicide to Scholz were "statements of opinion and not verifiable fact and therefore could not form the basis of a claim of defamation". On June 6, 2016, the Supreme Court of the United States declined to review the case.

In 2012, The Boston Globe revealed how court papers related to the Scholz dispute also showed how Delp was accused of hiding a camera in the bedroom of his houseguest Meg Sullivan, sister of his fiancee Pamela Sullivan. Meg allegedly discovered the camera on February 28, 2007, nine days before Delp's death.

== Discography ==
=== with Boston ===
- Boston (1976)
- Don't Look Back (1978)
- Third Stage (1986)
- Corporate America (2002)
- Life, Love & Hope (2013)

=== with Barry Goudreau ===
- Barry Goudreau (1980)

=== with Orion the Hunter ===
- Orion the Hunter (1984)

=== with RTZ ===
- Return to Zero (1991)
- Lost (1998)
- Lost and Found (2004)

=== with Delp and Goudreau ===
- Delp and Goudreau (2003)
- "Rockin' Away" (2007)

=== with Mark "Guitar" Miller ===
- Whatcha Gonna Do! (2008)

=== Other appearances ===
- Keith Emerson - Best Revenge - Playing For Keeps (1982)
- Bruce Arnold - Orpheus Again (2010)
