= Tom Scholz =

American musician (born 1947)

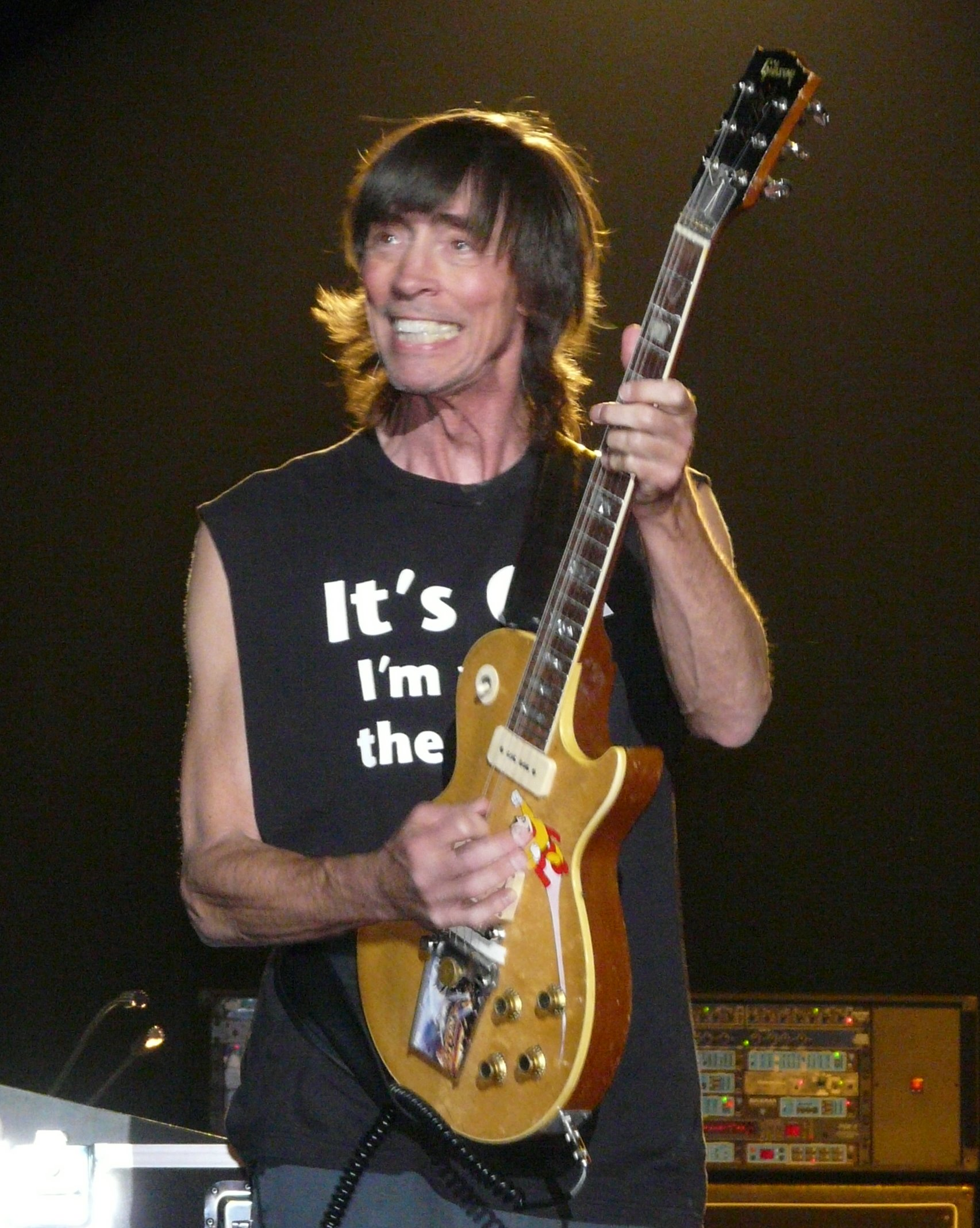
- Scholz in 2008

Background information
- Born: Donald Thomas Scholz; March 10, 1947 (age 79); Toledo, Ohio, U.S
- Origin: Boston, Massachusetts, U.S.
- Genres: Hard rock; arena rock; progressive rock
- Occupations: Musician; songwriter; record producer; engineer; inventor
- Instruments: Guitar; bass; keyboards; drums; vocals
- Years active: 1969–present
- Labels: Epic; MCA; Artemis; Frontiers
- Member of: Boston
- Spouse(s): Cynthia Hartford (m. 1971, divorced) Kim Hart (m. 2007)

Donald Thomas Scholz (born March 10, 1947) is an American musician. He is the founder and only constant original member of the rock band Boston. A multi-instrumentalist, Scholz plays guitar, bass, keyboards, and drums and has also performed backing vocals live.

Scholz is an MIT-trained engineer who designed and built his own recording studio in an apartment basement in the early 1970s. A fan of rock music throughout his teen years, Scholz began writing songs while earning his master's degree at MIT. The first Boston album was mostly recorded in his basement studio, primarily using devices he invented. After the success of Boston, he founded Scholz Research & Development, Inc. to develop and market his inventions, many under the Rockman brand. Scholz holds several patents related to his work at SR&D over the years.

He was described by AllMusic as an "un-rock n' roll" figure who did not enjoy the limelight of being a performer, preferring to concentrate on music, production, and inventing new electronic equipment. In more recent years, he has dedicated much of his money and time to charitable work.

== Early life ==
Tom Scholz was born in Toledo, Ohio, and raised in the suburb of Ottawa Hills. His father, Don Scholz, was a homebuilder who became wealthy from his designs of prefabricated luxury houses and founded Scholz Design, the forerunner of Scholz Homes Inc.

As a child, Scholz studied classical piano. He also had a penchant for tinkering with everything from go-karts to model airplanes and was always building or designing. A top student and a member of the varsity basketball team, he graduated from Ottawa Hills High School in 1965. Before his musical career, Scholz received both a bachelor's degree (1969) and a master's degree (1970) in mechanical engineering from the Massachusetts Institute of Technology and worked for Polaroid Corporation as a senior product design engineer.

== Career ==
Scholz had a keen interest in music and began recording demos in his home studio while working at Polaroid. He spent six years unsuccessfully submitting demos to record companies.

Eventually the demos attracted the interest of Epic Records, who signed Scholz and singer Brad Delp to a recording contract. Scholz believed his demos were good enough for release as Boston's debut album, but Epic told Scholz to re-record the demos. Most of the guitar, bass, and keyboards were performed by Scholz, although other players were involved sporadically throughout the recordings, most notably drummer Jim Masdea. Epic did not want the album recorded entirely in Scholz's home as Scholz had intended (the label suggested using a recording studio), but most of what ended up on the album had indeed been recorded by Scholz in his basement. While the album was being completed, Scholz and Delp added three additional local musicians to round out the band, who played little if anything on the record itself: bassist Fran Sheehan, guitarist Barry Goudreau and drummer Sib Hashian.

The album was released in 1976 and became the biggest-selling debut album by any artist up to that time. The single "More Than a Feeling" has become a rock classic. The band also quickly became a popular live act.

Scholz's reputed perfectionism delayed the follow-up album, Don't Look Back, for two years. When it was finally released, he was unhappy with the result, claiming that it was released under pressure from the record company. Scholz then declared he would not release any more music unless he was completely satisfied with the final product. Consequently, Boston's third album, Third Stage, did not appear until 1986. That album was certified 4× platinum, and "Amanda" reached the top of the singles chart. Scholz and Brad Delp were the only members of the original group to appear on the album.

Scholz also started his own line of guitar effects under the name Rockman. Among the many Rockman effects available, one could reproduce the unique "Boston" guitar sound. The boxes were arranged in cabinets and played through an (analog) stereo signal path. The originals have today become collector's items.

After Brad Delp's suicide in March 2007, his adult children organized a concert in his memory on August 19, 2007, at the Bank of America Pavilion in Boston and invited the group to perform. Fran Cosmo was unable to sing because of a vocal injury, so Scholz invited guest singers to appear in his place, including Michael Sweet from Stryper and long time Boston fan Tommy DeCarlo who, after auditioning for Scholz, made a guest appearance on lead vocals. DeCarlo would later become the lead singer for Boston. Early Boston members Barry Goudreau and Fran Sheehan also appeared, joining Scholz on stage for the first time in over 25 years.

== Personal life ==
=== Politics ===
Politically liberal, Scholz supported Barack Obama in the 2008 Democratic primaries, and in the 2008 general election. However, he insisted that he was merely a supporter of Obama, and was not endorsing a presidential candidate. In February 2008, Scholz issued a cease and desist letter to then-Republican Governor of Arkansas and presidential candidate Mike Huckabee, instructing him to stop using the song "More Than a Feeling" at his campaign rallies. Scholz has also been very critical of the Trump administration, posting to the band's Facebook page about the topic on multiple occasions.

=== Family ===
Scholz married his first wife, Cynthia Hartford, in October 1971, shortly after they both graduated from college. They have a son who followed in his father's footsteps by graduating from MIT.

Scholz married Kim Hart in the Florida Keys on January 11, 2007. They live in the Boston area.

=== Diet ===
Scholz has been a vegetarian for more than 30 years.

=== Philanthropy ===
In 1987, he established a charitable foundation, the DTS Charitable Foundation, which has a variety of missions: supporting animal protection, providing vegetarian resources, stopping world hunger, creating homeless shelters, food banks, animal rescues and sanctuaries, and advocating for children's rights. The foundation has raised millions of dollars. PETA awarded him their Compassionate Action Award in 2013.

== Discography ==
=== Studio albums ===
- Boston (1976)
- Don't Look Back (1978)
- Third Stage (1986)
- Walk On (1994)
- Corporate America (2002)
- Life, Love & Hope (2013)

=== Compilation albums ===
- Greatest Hits (1997)
