= A Man I'll Never Be =

Single by Boston

from the album Don't Look Back
- B-side: "Don't Be Afraid"
- Released: November 2, 1978
- Recorded: 1977–1978
- Genre: Hard rock; arena rock
- Length: 6:40
- Label: Epic
- Songwriter: Tom Scholz
- Producer: Tom Scholz

Boston singles chronology
"Don't Look Back" (1978)	"A Man I'll Never Be" (1978)	"Feelin' Satisfied" (1979)

Music video
- "A Man I'll Never Be (Radio edit)" on YouTube

"A Man I'll Never Be" is a song written by Tom Scholz, released in 1978 on Boston's second album Don't Look Back. It was also released as a single and reached number 31 on the US Billboard Hot 100, spending twelve weeks on the chart, five of those in the top 40. It also reached number 27 in Canada.

== Writing and recording ==
According to Scholz, the lyrics for "A Man I'll Never Be" came to him quickly after he completed the music. Brad Delp sang the lead and backing vocals and Scholz played lead and rhythm guitar, organ and piano. The only other musician on the recording was drummer Sib Hashian The song was mostly recorded at Scholz's Hideaway Studio, although the piano part was recorded by engineer Dave Butler at Northern Studio in Maynard, Massachusetts, allegedly because Hideaway was too small to fit the piano.

== Lyrics and music ==
"A Man I'll Never Be" is a change of pace from the songs on Boston's debut album and some of the other songs on Don't Look Back. AllMusic critic Tim Sendra claimed that the song reveals "a reflective side that was nowhere to be found on Boston". Paul Grein of Billboard commented on the song's "religious feel", describing it as "the softest cut on the album" and noting that "it may well be a strong single." Grein also commented on the song's "moody organ solo" and "ponderous ballad sound". Pete Prown and Harvey P. Newquist described Scholz's guitar solo as long and dramatic. Ultimate Classic Rock critic Michael Gallucci described the song as "an introspective ballad", unlike the band's typical material. Rolling Stone critic Ken Emerson compared "A Man I'll Never Be" to Led Zeppelin's lengthy classic song "Stairway to Heaven". On Boston's official site, David Wild described the song as "a slowburning power ballad reflecting real grown-up concerns and lived-in reality". Craig Rosen of Billboard also described the song as a power ballad.

Greil Marcus, writing in New West magazine, described the song's subject as "how hard it is to live up to a girl's image of a boy". Marcus cited the bravery of the lyrics, in which the singer acknowledges his inadequacy, and described the theme of the song as "the wimp redeemed". He further explained that the singer sounds "trivial" and "insufferable" at first, but as the guitars in the background build, he achieves a measure of glory in his suffering with the lines "You look up at me/And somewhere in your mind you see/A man I’ll never be". Marcus concluded that although the singer never achieves the peace of mind he is seeking, "he is allowed a sense of self, of justification, and one comes away convinced that existence, no matter how miserable, is not meaningless".

Emerson similarly saw the theme of the song to be apprehension "with failing to be a man." He noted that the lyrics sometimes contradict the lyrics of other songs on Don't Look Back. For example, a line in the title track says "I'm much too strong not to compromise", but one from "A Man I'll Never Be" says "I can't get any stronger". "A Man I'll Never Be" also has a line stating that "Emotions can't be satisfied", which contradicts the title of its follow-up single, "Feelin' Satisfied". Emerson concluded that the song "both distills and expands upon this knot of despair, which contrasts with the architectural magnificence of the song's musical accomplishments".

== Release ==
"A Man I'll Never Be" was released in late 1978 as the follow-up single to "Don't Look Back," which had reached No. 4 on the Billboard Hot 100. The single did not perform as well as its predecessor, peaking at No. 31 in January 1979. It performed slightly better in Canada, peaking at No. 27.

"A Man I'll Never Be" was later included on Boston's Greatest Hits (1997).

== Reception ==
Marcus rated the song as one of three masterpieces on Don't Look Back, along with the title track and "Used to Bad News". Billboard similarly rated the song as one of the best cuts on Don't Look Back. Billboard called it "a slick ballad with searing guitars and Brad Delp's fluid lead vocal highlighting." Cash Box said that it begins "with a piano ballad feel which quickly expands when Tom Scholz adds his princely guitar work" and said that the keyboards "sound like a church harpiscord" and the "vocals are characteristically soaring." Record World called it a "mid-tempo ballad keyed by Brad Delp's high sweet vocals and the group's churning guitar sound." Gallucci and Craig each rated it as Boston's 10th greatest song. Classic Rock critic Paul Elliott rated it as Boston's 9th greatest song. According to Elliot, the song is a favorite of Def Leppard bass guitarist Rick Savage. Elliott described it as "an existentialist power ballad of monumental proportions." SingersRoom critic Edward Tomlin rated it as Boston's 7th best song, calling it "a testament to Boston’s musical versatility and ability to craft deeply moving, introspective songs" and particularly praising the "haunting guitar solo that perfectly captures the bittersweet nostalgia of the lyrics." Los Angeles Times critic Jon Matsumoto called the song "a grandiose guilty pleasure". On the other hand, Milo Miles of Boston Phoenix called it a long stretch "of immaculate self-abuse".

== Live performances ==
Boston played "A Man I'll Never Be" live on the tour supporting their first album in 1977 before recording it for Don't Look Back. Delp played the keyboards for these performances. Ottawa Journal critic Mike Volsin stated that the song's slow melody showed that Boston "can settle into the slower mood without any difficulty". Referring to a live performance of the song prior to its release, Peter Robb stated that Delp's voice "stood out like a shining light".

== Cover versions ==
Extreme covered the song live in a tribute concert for Brad Delp. After Delp's death, Tommy DeCarlo used the tune to record a song "A Man I'll Always Be" as a tribute to Delp. That recording and several Boston covers he recorded separately led to his getting the job as Boston's new lead singer.

== Charts ==
Chart (1978)	Peak position
Canada Top Singles (RPM)	27
US Billboard Hot 100	31
