= Don't Look Back (Boston song) =

Single by Boston

from the album Don't Look Back
- B-side: "The Journey"
- Released: August 2, 1978
- Recorded: 1978
- Studio: Tom Scholz's Hideaway Studio; Northern Studio (Maynard, Massachusetts)
- Genre: Hard rock; arena rock
- Length: 5:58 (Album Version); 4:05 (Radio Edit)
- Label: Epic
- Songwriter: Tom Scholz
- Producer: Tom Scholz

Boston singles chronology
"Peace of Mind" (1977)	"Don't Look Back" (1978)	"A Man I'll Never Be" (1978)

Music video
- "Don't Look Back" (Radio edit) on YouTube

"Don't Look Back" is a song by American rock band Boston, written by main songwriter, guitarist and bandleader Tom Scholz. It was released as the title track and first single from their second studio album, Don't Look Back (1978). It reached number 4 on the US Billboard Hot 100 chart, making it one of the band's biggest hits.

== Writing and recording ==
Although the first song on the album, "Don't Look Back" was its final song to be written and recorded. According to Scholz "It was one of those things where everything clicked. I didn't even record a demo for that song. I came up with chord changes, melody, and the arrangement and put it right on the master tape." Brad Delp sang all the vocals, both lead and backing. According to Scholz, Fran Sheehan only played a few bass notes on the song and Barry Goudreau played the solo guitar parts in the intro and outro. Scholz praised Goudreau's lead guitar playing at the end of the song. Scholz also stated that he made more than 60 edits to Sib Hashian's drum track in order to get the performance he wanted.

== Lyrics and music ==
Paul Grein of Billboard cited "Don't Look Back" as an example of Boston's skill at changing tempos, stating that it "actually stops midway through and then rebuilds gradually to its peak of intensity." Rolling Stone critic Tim Emerson described the lyrics as "optimistic about the road that lies ahead." But Emerson also states that some of the optimism in the lyrics is contradicted in other songs, specifically comparing the use of the line "I'm much too strong not to compromise" in this song with the much more pessimistic line "I can't get any stronger" in its follow up single "A Man I'll Never Be." In the liner notes to the 2006 reissue of Don't Look Back, David Wild described the title song as a "beautiful barnburner in the proud tradition of Boston's classic "More Than a Feeling." AXS contributor Bill Craig stated that it contained all the components people expected from Boston: "buzzing guitars, towering vocals, and lyrics that connected with young listeners."

== Reception ==
Billboard rated the song one of the best cuts on Don't Look Back, and stated that the song "resounds with a thunderous rock beat underlined by a highly rich and melodic bass and a powerful vocal." It describes the instrumentals as "high powered" with "searing" guitar playing. Cash Box said that "Scholtz and Goudreau open with blazing guitar riffs" and that the "hard rock edge" is tempered by the "soaring vocals, melodic passages and a break at the 3:00 minute mark." Record World said that "The sound is much the same as Boston debut album with the strong bass/guitar line sweetened by Brad Delp's stellar vocals." Greil Marcus rated the song as one of three masterpieces on Don't Look Back, along with "A Man I'll Never Be" and "Used to Bad News." Allmusic critic Tim Sendra described its riff as "killer," saying that it was similar to that in "More Than a Feeling." The New Rolling Stone Album Guide critic Paul Evans felt that "Don't Look Back" was the one song on its album that could "hold its own" on Boston's first album.

Ultimate Classic Rock critic Eduardo Rivadavia similarly stated that it "met every expectation set by Boston’s nearly perfect debut." Ultimate Classic Rock critic Michael Gallucci rated it the band's 4th all time best song. AXS contributor Bill Craig similarly rated it Boston's 3rd greatest song, describing it as an "arena rock style sonic blast." Classic Rock critic Paul Elliott described it as a "glorious, revving rock anthem." Philip Booth of the Lakeland Ledger called it one "of the most-played-by-garage-band rockers of the '70s." Pete Prown and Harvey P. Newquist praised the "layers of guitar harmonies" as well as Barry Goudreau's slide guitar playing and rideout guitar solo. Ottawa Journal critic Mike Voslin rated the song as a live performance highlight.

CBS Records reported that the "Don't Look Back" single sold more than a million copies in the first two weeks or so following its release. The single peaked at #4 on the Billboard Hot 100 in October 1978. It also reached the Top 10 in Canada, peaking at #6. It reached #14 in the Netherlands but only reached #43 in the UK. "Don't Look Back" was included on Boston's Greatest Hits album in 1997. "Don't Look Back" is the band's second biggest hit on the Billboard Hot 100, after 1986's "Amanda," which hit No. 1.

== Charts ==
=== Weekly charts ===
Chart (1978)	Peak position
Australian Singles (Kent Music Report)	51
Canada Top Singles (RPM)	6
Ireland (IRMA)	8
Netherlands (Single Top 100)	14
UK Singles (Official Charts)	43
US Billboard Hot 100	4
US Cash Box Top 100	7

=== Year-end charts ===
Chart (1978)	Peak position
Canada	50
US Billboard Hot 100	93
US Cash Box	48

== In popular culture ==
- "Don't Look Back" was used in the pilot episode of the ABC drama series October Road, which aired on March 15, 2007, six days after the death of Boston's original lead singer, Brad Delp.
- The song was featured in "Bailey's Show", the sixth episode of the first season of the CBS sitcom WKRP In Cincinnati.
- The song was used in episode 6 of the comedic web series Cobra Kai.
- "Don't Look Back" was featured in the final episode of season 1 of the comedy web series Future Man.
- The song made an appearance in episode 22 of season 2 of The WB/The CW dark fantasy series Supernatural.
- It was also used in original airings of episode 7 of season 5 of the Fox sitcom That '70s Show. It, along with other songs used in the episode, were removed from the DVD version.
- The song was performed by the remaining original members of Boston on August 19, 2007, at the Bank of America Pavilion in Boston, Mass. for the tribute concert to Delp. It was the last song of the concert.
