= Si Te Vas =

Si Te Vas (Spanish for "If you leave") may refer to:

- Si Te Vas (album), an album by Jon Secada
  - "Si Te Vas", the B-side of the song "If You Go" by Jon Secada
- "Si Te Vas" (Paulina Rubio song), a 2016 song by Paulina Rubio
- "Si Te Vas" (Pedro Fernández song), 1994, also performed by Marc Anthony
- "Si Te Vas", a song by Carlos Rivera from the album El Hubiera No Existe
- "Si Te Vas", a song by Jesse & Joy from the album Electricidad
- "Si Te Vas", a song by Kairo
- "Si Te Vas", a song by Luis Miguel from the album Nada Es Igual...
- "Si Te Vas", a song by Paloma San Basilio
- "Si Te Vas", a song by Sech from the album 1 of 1
- "Si Te Vas", a song by Reik from the album Peligro
- "Si Te Vas", a song by Shakira from the album Dónde Están los Ladrones?
- "Si Te Vas", a song by Vicente Fernández from the album Hoy Platique Con Gallo
- "Si Te Vas", a song by Wisin from the album El Regreso del Sobreviviente
- "Si Te Vas", a song by Zion
- "Si Te Vas", a song by J Balvin and Jay Wheeler

== See also ==
- Si Tú Te Vas (disambiguation)
- Te Vas (disambiguation)
