= Murder by Pride =

Studio album by Stryper
- Released: July 21, 2009
- Recorded: 2007–2008
- Genres: Christian metal, heavy metal
- Length: 45:45
- Label: Big 3
- Producer: Michael Sweet

Stryper chronology
The Roxx Regime Demos (2007)	Murder by Pride (2009)	The Covering (2011)

Murder by Pride is the seventh studio album by Stryper. It was released on July 21, 2009 by Big 3 Records. The first single for the album, "Peace of Mind", debuted at No. 27 on Christianrock.net on October 24, 2008 and peaked at 1 on February 22, 2009. The track is a cover version, originally performed by rock band Boston on its debut 1976 self-titled album. Michael Sweet was a touring member of Boston for several years, before parting ways amicably in 2011.

Starting May 5, the band announced to release a song per week on iTunes up until July 21. As each new song was released, the previous one would no longer be available until the full album was released.

Robert Sweet did not play on the album since he lost the CD that had the demos on it and he wasn't able to learn the material in time for recording. According to Michael Sweet it would have taken seven to ten days longer to record the drums with Robert but they didn't have the time or the budget to do so. As a result, the drum parts were provided by Kenny Aronoff and only took three days to record. However, Robert Sweet was present on the tour that supported the album, as well as the commemoration of Stryper's 25th anniversary.

Stylistically, Michael Sweet has commented, that "after years of speaking to fans and hearing comments like 'more guitars,' 'more solos' and 'more screams,' I decided to keep those suggestions in mind as I wrote each song. It was important to me to try to get back to that early sound of STRYPER yet at the same time, to remain relevant today. It's certainly not an easy thing to do, but as I listen to Murder by Pride, I think that was accomplished."

== Reception ==
Professional ratings
Review scores
Source	Rating
AllMusic	3/5 stars
Jesus Freak Hideout	3.5/5 stars

The album debuted on the following Billboard charts:

- No. 73 on the Billboard 200
- No. 32 on Rock Albums
- No. 2 on Christian Albums
- No. 13 on Independent Albums
- No. 11 on Hard Rock Albums

== Track listing ==
All tracks written by Michael Sweet, except "Peace of Mind", written by Tom Scholz.

1. "Eclipse for the Son" – 5:05
2. "4 Leaf Clover" – 3:41
3. "Peace of Mind" (Boston cover) – 3:59
4. "Alive" – 3:36
5. "The Plan" – 3:11
6. "Murder by Pride" – 3:18
7. "Mercy Over Blame" – 4:10
8. "I Believe" – 3:43
9. "Run in You" – 4:15
10. "Love is Why" – 4:08
11. "Everything" – 4:25
12. "My Love (I'll Always Show)" – 3:15

International bonus tracks
No.	Title	Length
13.	"My Love My Life My Flame"

Japanese bonus tracks
No.	Title	Length
13.	"The Way" (Live 2003)
14.	"Winter Wonderland" (Live 2003)
15.	"My Love My Life My Flame"

== Personnel ==
Stryper

- Michael Sweet – lead vocals, guitars, arrangements (1, 2, 4–12)
- Oz Fox – lead guitars, backing vocals
- Tracy Ferrie – bass, backing vocals
- Robert Sweet – drums (credited, but does not play)

Additional musicians

- Paul McNamara – acoustic piano, keyboards
- Tom Scholz – guitar (3), arrangements (3)
- Danny Bernini – percussion
- Kenny Aronoff – drums
- Danny Bernini – percussion

== Production ==
- Bill Edwards – executive producer
- Danny Bernini – producer, mixing, engineer (tracks)
- Michael Sweet – producer, mixing, engineer (lead vocals)
- Kenny Lewis – editing, transferring engineer
- Bob Ludwig – mastering
- Richie "Britley" Hughes – art direction
- Gilvan Rangel – cover artwork, photography
- Deep South Entertainment – management

Studios

- Recorded at Longview Studios and Tongue & Groove Studio (Philadelphia, Pennsylvania); Spirit House Music (Northampton, Massachusetts).
- Mixed at Spirit House Music
- Mastered at Gateway Mastering (Portland, Maine).

== Charts ==
Chart (2009)	Peak position
US Billboard 200	73
US Top Christian Albums (Billboard)	2
US Independent Albums (Billboard)	13
US Top Hard Rock Albums (Billboard)	11
US Top Rock Albums (Billboard)	32
