= Peace of Mind (Boston song) =

Single by Boston

from the album Boston
- B-side: "Foreplay"
- Released: April 1977
- Recorded: October 1975 – April 1976
- Studio: Foxglove Studios in Watertown, Massachusetts; Capitol Studios in Hollywood, California; The Record Plant in Los Angeles, California (album version)/ April 1976 (single version)
- Genre: Hard rock; arena rock
- Length: 5:02 (album version); 3:38 (single version)
- Label: Epic
- Songwriter: Tom Scholz
- Producers: John Boylan, Tom Scholz

Boston singles chronology
"Long Time" (1977)	"Peace of Mind" (1977)	"Don't Look Back" (1978)

Audio
- "Peace of Mind" (Album version) on YouTube

"Peace of Mind" is a song by American rock band Boston, written by Tom Scholz. It was on their 1976 debut album Boston, and was released the next year as the third and final single from the album. It peaked at number 38 on the U.S. Billboard Hot 100 in 1977, as well as number 33 on the Cash Box Top 100. It received substantial radio airplay, both upon the initial release of the Boston album and subsequently, and has been described as a "rock-radio staple".

== Writing and recording ==
"Peace of Mind" is one of six songs, five of which eventually appeared on the Boston album, that Scholz worked on in his basement in 1974 and 1975, before Boston got its record contract. The demo was finished in 1974. The drum parts were originally developed by Jim Masdea, although Sib Hashian played the drums on the official release. According to Ultimate Classic Rock critic Michael Gallucci, the demo version was "fully formed" and so the album version did not change much except for "[amping] up the guitars and production".

== Lyrics and music ==
The song is about the people Scholz worked with at the Polaroid Corporation before getting his recording contract, and about Scholz's lack of interest in climbing the corporate ladder into company management. Dick Nusser of Billboard described the theme of the song being that "Competition and a corporate slot aren't the only choices. Better to turn on, tune in and seek 'Peace Of Mind.'" Ultimate Classic Rock critic Ryan Reed said that the song's message is that "Every time you suck up to the corporate overlords, you lose a piece of your soul" and that the key to the song is that "the narrator, having hopped off that merry-go-round, has already earned his peace of mind — and, it seems, we can, too." According to music journalist Chuck Eddy, the lyrics argue that it is unhealthy for people to compete with each other. Paul Elliott commented on the lyrics' "positivity," exhorting people to look past their mundane life to "find deeper meaning". He also noted the song's "uplifting quality," expressed through "its freewheeling riff, its rich melody and dazzling vocal harmonies". AXS contributor Craig James describes the theme as being "that it is better to make music and being at peace with yourself is better than corporate aspirations." Vanyaland's Daniel Brockman found irony in the refrain, "I understand about indecision, and I don't care if I get behind/People living in competition, all I want is to have my peace of mind," noting that this was a hit single premised on lyrics stating that one shouldn't take their career too seriously. Mojo magazine cited the lyrics as presenting an alternate view of the American Dream to that described in another song from the Boston album, "Hitch a Ride".

The Greenwood Encyclopedia of Rock History described the song as being "built around soaring guitars, tight vocal harmonies, and huge hooks," which were part of the band's appeal. Boston lead singer Brad Delp cited "Peace of Mind" as an example of how Scholz was able to combine the vocal harmonies of the Beach Boys with the heavy guitar sound of Led Zeppelin. Rolling Stone commented on how the guitars "feel epic" but also "delicate and intimate". Tom Moon cited "Peace of Mind" and "Long Time" as examples to illustrate how Scholz varied his guitar effects for each Boston song, stating that "Peace of Mind" has a "grittier, less airbrushed attack".

The song is among the earliest ones in popular music to use vi–IV–I–V chord progression, a variant of I–V–vi–IV progression, widely popular in modern Western music.

== Reception ==
Cash Box said "this might be [Boston's] best yet as far as all pop radio stations are concerned, since the record maintains an acoustical feeling despite the electronic thunderbolts crashing in the distance." Record World said that "The guitar work and Delp's soaring vocal again stand out." Rolling Stone Album Guide critic Paul Evans called "Peace of Mind" a "satisfying, if similar, followup" to "More Than a Feeling". Scott Tady of Beaver County Times described "Peace of Mind" as one of the songs that "helped set the foundation for classic-rock radio". Eric Deggans wrote that "Bouncy, slick tracks such as "More Than a Feeling" and "Peace of Mind" defined new parameters for rock radio during the 70s, with soaring vocals searing guitars and trite lyrics." Jamie Reno of San Diego magazine described it as an "infectious flick-your Bic staple". MTV's Gil Kaufman similarly described the song as a "rock-radio staple". Brockman called it "one of the most overplayed songs in rock history" but praised Delp's singing, particularly his vulnerability and sincerity, making Brockman believe that Delp really believed the words of the refrain. Los Angeles Times critic Robert Hilburn criticized the "marginal" lyrics that he described as "a tedious outcry against the commercial 'rat race'" and said it has the "lilting, but somewhat sterile exuberance of the early Doobie Brothers."

Gallucci rated it Boston's fifth greatest song, particularly praising the "fuzzy guitar riff" and noting that it has remained a classic rock radio staple. Elliott and Craig both rated it even higher, as Boston's second greatest song behind only "More Than a Feeling". Classic Rock History critic Brian Kachejian also rated it as Boston's second-best song, saying that he would have rated it number one "if it were not for the sentimentality of the impact that "More Than A Feeling" had on generation." SingersRoom critic Edward Tomlin also rated it as Boston's second-best song, calling it "a classic rock anthem that showcases the band’s signature sound of guitar harmonies and layered vocals" and "powerful guitar solos and catchy chorus."Guitar World magazine selected "Peace of Mind" as one of their 50 greatest rock songs of all time. In 2024 Ultimate Classic Rock critic Allison Rapp rated it to be rock music's 23rd best work song.

== Personnel ==
=== Boston ===
- Tom Scholz – acoustic and electric rhythm guitar, lead guitar, bass
- Sib Hashian – drums
- Brad Delp – vocals

== In popular culture ==
- The song is featured in the enhanced versions of the 2013 game Grand Theft Auto V on the in-game radio station, Los Santos Rock Radio.
- The song is used in Supernatural for its first season episode "Hook Man" at the end of the episode.

== Covers ==
"Peace of Mind" was covered by Stryper on their 2009 Murder by Pride album. Tom Scholz also played guitar on that track. Allmusic critic James Christopher Monger described Stryper's version as "a choice cover of the Boston classic".

== Charts ==
Chart (1977)	Peak position
Canada Top Singles (RPM)	41
US Billboard Hot 100	38
U.S. Cash Box Top 100	33
