= Don't Look Back (Boston album) =

1978 studio album by Boston

Studio album by Boston
- Released: August 15, 1978
- Recorded: 1977–1978
- Studios: Tom Scholz's Hideaway Studio; Northern Studio (Maynard, Massachusetts)
- Genres: Hard rock; arena rock
- Length: 33:46
- Label: Epic
- Producer: Tom Scholz

Boston chronology
Boston (1976)	Don't Look Back (1978)	Third Stage (1986)

Singles from Don't Look Back
- 1. "Don't Look Back" Released: August 1978; 2. "A Man I'll Never Be" Released: November 1978; 3. "Feelin' Satisfied" Released: March 1979

Don't Look Back is the second studio album by American rock band Boston, released in 1978 by Epic Records, as the band's last album on the label. The album reached No. 1 in both the US and Canada, and No. 9 in the UK. The title track helped with the album's success, reaching No. 4 in 1978 on the US Billboard Hot 100 and remains one of the band's biggest hits. The album sold over one million copies in the ten days following its release and was certified 7× platinum by the Recording Industry Association of America (RIAA) in the US on April 11, 1996.

The album's two-year gap from its predecessor marks the shortest between two of the band's studio albums to date; guitarist, producer and primary songwriter Tom Scholz claimed that Epic executives pushed him and the band into releasing the album before they felt it was ready. He also felt that the album "was ridiculously short". Their next album, Third Stage, was not released for another eight years, by which time the band and record label had parted ways and fought a courtroom battle that Boston ultimately won.

== Recording ==
Don't Look Back was recorded during 1977 and 1978 at Scholz's Hideaway Studio, except for the piano on "A Man I'll Never Be", which was recorded by engineer Dave Butler at Northern Studio in Maynard, Massachusetts.

== Songs ==
"Don't Look Back", "A Man I'll Never Be" and "Feelin' Satisfied" were all released as singles, reaching No. 4, 31 and 46 respectively on the Billboard Hot 100.

"The Journey" is a short instrumental track that links the opening title track and the third track, "It's Easy". In 1987, Scholz cited it as his favorite song on any of Boston's first three albums, but wished that it were longer. He described it as, "I'm floating through space, cruising in an airplane over the clouds". Billboard writer Paul Grein cited "The Journey" as an example of science fiction-like music on Don't Look Back that is consistent with the guitar-spaceship cover art of the album (and single). Grein referred to it as having an "almost religious" tone, anticipating that some listeners would find it "pretentious" but stating that he found it an effective interlude between the harder-rocking songs "Don't Look Back" and "It's Easy". Emerson said that the organ sounds church-like and that the guitars sound "ghostly", making the track sound "eerie and alienated". He compared "The Journey" to David Bowie's work during the late 1970s. According to Scholz, the song had been lying around for years before he found "the right theme to match the music". It took him just three days to record. The song was the only one on the album without a drum track, and so it was the only song on which drummer Sib Hashian did not appear. Barry Goudreau, who played rhythm guitar, was the only musician on the track besides Scholz. "The Journey" was released as the B-side of the "Don't Look Back" single.

Grein described the transition from "The Journey" to "It's Easy" as "appropriately jarring" due to the latter song's fast boogie guitar introduction. "It's Easy" contains the line "I believe what we achieve will soon be left behind", which Emerson points out appears to be sung to a girl with whom the singer is having a one-night stand, but may also be a self-reference to Boston's own music, similar to the band's approach on their earlier hit "More Than a Feeling". Emerson also noted a similar theme of nostalgia between "More Than a Feeling" and "It's Easy". Writer Derek Oliver included the song as one of several on the album that retained Boston's "signature sound" of "pristine production, humongous orchestral guitars and stupendous vocals" from the debut album. AllMusic critic Tim Sendra found this song "more reflective" than any of the material on Boston's debut.

"Party" was co-written by Delp and Scholz. It begins with a short, slow introduction before a surprising change of pace to the fast, harder sound that persists throughout the rest of the song, in much the same way as "Something About You" from the debut. The dual themes of "Party" are loud parties and teenage sex. Grein compared the "raucous bar band climax" ending of the song to Aerosmith. Sendra found the song to be a "storming rocker" in the mold of "Smokin'" from the debut. "Party" is another song cited by Oliver as retaining the band's signature sound. Billboard rated "Party" to be one of the best songs on the album. It is one of four songs from the album that were included on Boston's Greatest Hits album, along with the three singles.

"Used to Bad News" was written by Delp, making it the only song on the album on which Scholz did not receive a writing credit. Emerson described "Used to Bad News" as "a charming, rather Beatles-like song". Greil Marcus rated it as one of the three "masterpieces" on the album, along with the title track and "A Man I'll Never Be". As with "It's Easy", Sendra considered the song to be more reflective than anything on the debut. "Used to Bad News" is the only song on the album on which Goudreau is the sole lead guitarist. Scholz played all the other instruments except drums. It was released as the B-side of the "Feelin' Satisfied" single.

"Don't Be Afraid" closes the album. The song had an earlier genesis than other songs on the album, as it was originally one of the demos Scholz worked on before getting a record contract. Grein stated that it "comes to a crashing, concert-like crescendo", specifically citing Hashian's drumming. It was also released as the B-side of the "A Man I'll Never Be" single.

== Original release ==
Don't Look Back was originally to be titled Arrival. However, Boston members discovered that Swedish pop group ABBA released an album by that name two years prior, so Don't Look Back was chosen.

== Compact disc releases ==
Don't Look Back was among the first commercially produced compact discs when the format was introduced in 1983, but because of ongoing legal issues between Scholz and CBS Records, the title was pulled after a small production run and did not reappear on CD until three years later. Inserts for the original CD pressings contained the "spaceship blueprints" from the original album dust jacket; those illustrations were not included in the 1986 reissue.

This album and the group's first album were remastered and re-released on June 13, 2006. The reissues were digitally remastered personally by Scholz after he heard indirectly that the remastering project was to be handled by Sony's team, which he felt was unacceptable. He took it on himself after negotiations with Legacy Recordings, saying, "I've always wanted to make those albums sound good on CD, and the chance arrived".

A small number of the Sony-remastered versions briefly went on sale in Canada on April 4, 2006, before being removed from sale. Those discs also included a live version of "Shattered Images" (mistitled "Help Me" on the packaging), an unreleased Boston original recorded at a 1976 concert in Philadelphia.

== Critical reception ==
Professional ratings
Review scores
Source	Rating
AllMusic	4/5 stars
Christgau's Record Guide	B−
The Rolling Stone Album Guide	2.5/5 stars

Don't Look Back received generally favorable reviews from critics. Billboard described the album as "an equally superior effort [as their debut album] that further refines this group's ability to play hard rock underlined by a sweet, melodic base". In a more mixed review, Ken Emerson of Rolling Stone said that the album "consolidated the sound of the band's debut album but was less pretentious than Bruce Springsteen's 1978 album Darkness on the Edge of Town". Emerson noted a theme of Scholz expressing his anxieties, particularly with making this album, as evidenced by lines about being unsure about measuring up as a man in "A Man I'll Never Be", and the line "I've been used/But I'm taking it like a man" in "Used to Bad News" (a song written by Brad Delp). Emerson also pointed out contradictions between the lyrics of certain songs, such as the line that "I'm much too strong not to compromise" in "Don't Look Back" versus the line in "A Man I'll Never Be" that "I can't get any stronger", or the line "Emotions can't be satisfied" in "A Man I'll Never Be" versus the title itself of "Feelin' Satisfied".

Brad Chadderton of The Ottawa Journal praised the album for its heavy, innovative and melodic guitar lines; for Brad Delp's vocals; and for lyrics that contain philosophical meaning, calling Don't Look Back an improvement over the debut album. Christgau's Record Guide gave the album a B−, stating "Not only are the guitars perfectly received, but the lyrical clichés seem specially selected to make the band as credible in the arena as they are in the studio, and Brad Delp's tenor, too thin for nasty cock-rock distractions, leaves us free to contemplate unsullied form." AllMusic gave the album four out of five stars, saying Boston sounds "inspired" on the album.

== Track listing ==
All tracks are written by Tom Scholz, except "Party", co-written with Brad Delp, and "Used to Bad News", written solely by Delp.

Side one
No.	Title	Length
1.	"Don't Look Back"	6:00
2.	"The Journey"	1:44
3.	"It's Easy"	4:24
4.	"A Man I'll Never Be"	6:36
Total length:		18:44

Side two
No.	Title	Length
5.	"Feelin' Satisfied"	4:11
6.	"Party"	4:06
7.	"Used to Bad News"	2:57
8.	"Don't Be Afraid"	3:48
Total length:		15:02

== Personnel ==
=== Boston ===
Adapted from the liner notes.

- Brad Delp – vocals, rhythm guitar, tambourine
- Tom Scholz – co-lead guitar (1, 8), lead guitar (2–6), acoustic and electric rhythm guitar (1, 3–8), organ (all), piano (4), bass guitar (all), "hands n' cans" (percussion)
- Sib Hashian – drums (1, 3–8), hands n' cans
- Barry Goudreau – co-lead guitar (1, 8), slide guitar (1, 8), rhythm guitar (2), lead guitar (7)
- Fran Sheehan – bass guitar (1; partial), hands n' cans

=== Additional personnel ===
- Rob Rosati – hands and cans
- Cindy Scholz – hands and cans
- Gloria – hands and cans

== Production ==
- Tom Scholz – producer, arrangements, engineer, cover concept, digital remastering
- Eric Carr – assistant engineer
- Dennis Coscia – assistant engineer
- Rob Rosati – assistant engineer
- David "db" Butler – piano recording (4)
- Wally Traugott – original mastering at Capitol Mastering (Hollywood, California)
- Tony Lane – art direction
- Gary Norman – cover artist
- Ron Pownall – album photography

== Charts ==
=== Weekly charts ===
Chart (1978)	Peak position
Australian Albums (Kent Music Report)	8
Canada Top Albums/CDs (RPM)	1
Dutch Albums (Album Top 100)	10
Finnish Albums (The Official Finnish Charts)	14
French Albums (SNEP)	13
German Albums (Offizielle Top 100)	10
Italian Albums (Musica e Dischi)	18
Japanese Albums (Oricon)	6
New Zealand Albums (RMNZ)	17
Norwegian Albums (VG-lista)	9
Swedish Albums (Sverigetopplistan)	8
UK Albums (Official Charts)	9
US Billboard 200	1

=== Year-end charts ===
Chart (1978)	Position
Canada Top Albums/CDs (RPM)	21
German Albums (Offizielle Top 100)	43
Chart (1979)	Position
US Billboard 200	72

== Certifications ==
Region	Certification	Certified units/sales
Canada (Music Canada)	4× Platinum	400,000^{^}
Japan (RIAJ)	Gold	100,000^{^}
United Kingdom (BPI)	Silver	60,000^{^}
United States (RIAA)	7× Platinum	7,000,000^{^}
^{^} Shipments figures based on certification alone.
