= Heart, Soul & a Voice =

Studio album by Jon Secada
- Released: May 23, 1994
- Recorded: 1993–1994
- Studio: Crescent Moon Studios (Miami, Florida); Criteria Studios (North Miami, Florida)
- Genre: Pop; R&B; Latin pop
- Length: 55:58
- Label: SBK
- Producer: Emilio Estefan Jr.; Jon Secada

Jon Secada chronology
Otro Día Más Sin Verte (1992)	Heart, Soul & a Voice (1994)	Si Te Vas (1994)

Singles from Heart, Soul & a Voice
- 1. "If You Go" Released: April 26, 1994; 2. "Whipped" Released: 1994; 3. "Mental Picture" Released: 1994

Professional ratings
Review scores
Source	Rating
AllMusic	3/5 stars
Entertainment Weekly	B+
The New York Times	(favourable)
People	(favourable)

Heart, Soul & a Voice is the second English-language album by Cuban American singer Jon Secada, released in 1994 on the SBK Records label. It contains the singles "Take Me", "If You Go", and "Mental Picture". All of the tracks except "Don't Be Silly" also appear as Spanish language versions on the corresponding Spanish album Si Te Vas.

== Track listing ==
1. "Whipped" – 4:31 (Jon Secada, Tom McWilliams)
2. "Take Me" – 5:00 (Secada, Lawrence Dermer)
3. "If You Go" – 4:33 (Secada, Miguel A. Morejon)
4. "Good Feelings" – 4:01 (Secada, Dermer)
5. "Where Do I Go from You?" – 4:25 (Diane Warren)
6. "Fat Chance" – 4:09 (Secada, McWilliams)
7. "Mental Picture" – 4:19 (Secada, Morejon)
8. "Stay" – 4:05 (Secada, Dermer)
9. "La, La, La" – 3:44 (Secada, Morejon)
10. "Don't Be Silly" – 4:07 (Secada, Scott Shapiro)
11. "Eyes of a Fool" – 4:07 (Secada, Morejon, Warren)
12. "Si Te Vas (If You Go)" – 4:38 (Secada, Morejon, Rebecca Fajardo)
13. "Tuyo (Take Me)" – 4:19 (Secada, Dermer, G. Estefan, E. Estefan, Rube Bloom)

== Personnel ==
- Jon Secada – vocals, backing vocals
- Tom McWilliams – programming (1, 6), arrangements (1, 6), drum loops (3), live drums (10), additional drum programming (12)
- Lawrence Dermer – programming (2, 4, 8), Hammond B3 organ (2, 4, 8, 13), vibraphone (2, 13), arrangements (2, 4, 8, 13), horn arrangements (2, 4, 8), backing vocals (4)
- Nathaniel Seidman – programming (2, 4, 5), ride cymbal (2), arrangements (2, 4, 5, 13), live cymbals (8, 13), additional drum programming (9)
- Miguel A. Morejon – programming (3, 7, 9), arrangements (3, 7, 9, 11, 12), horn arrangements (9)
- Clay Ostwald – additional digital piano (11)
- Rene Toledo – guitars (1, 7)
- Andy Goldman – guitars (2, 4, 5, 8, 13)
- John DeFaria – guitars (6, 9)
- Scott Shapiro – guitars (6, 10), guitar solo (7, 10), keyboards (10), programming (10), arrangements (10)
- Juanito Márquez – guitars (11)
- Jorge Casas – bass (7, 11), fretless bass (8)
- Angelo Morris – additional bass overdubs (8), bass overdubs (13)
- Rafael Padilla – congas (6), percussion (6)
- Freddy Piñero Jr. – shaker (7)
- Edwin Bonilla – congas (11), percussion (11)
- Ed Calle – saxophones (2, 4, 8, 9, 13), horn arrangements (2, 4, 8, 13)
- Teddy Mulet – trombone (2, 4, 8, 13), trumpet (9)
- Dana Teboe – trombone (2, 4, 8, 9, 13)
- Randall Barlow – trumpet (2, 4, 8, 9, 13), horn orchestration (9), programming (11), arrangements (11)
- Arturo Sandoval – trumpet (2, 4, 8, 13)
- Beth Cohen – backing vocals (1)
- Willy Perez-Ferla – backing vocals (1)
- Betty Wright – backing vocals (2, 4, 8)
- Miriam Mandelkern – backing vocals (3, 5, 12, 13)
- LaGaylia Frazier – backing vocals (5)
- Donna Allen – backing vocals (6, 9)

=== Production ===
- Emilio Estefan Jr. – producer
- Jon Secada – producer
- Charles Dye – production coordinator
- Lu Ann Graffeo – art direction
- Henry Marquez – art direction
- Carla Leighton – package design
- Daniela Federici – cover photography, additional photography
- Reisig & Taylor – additional photography
- Adolfo Ordiales Jr. – management

Technical

- Bob Ludwig – mastering at Gateway Mastering (Portland, Maine)
- Eric Schilling – engineer, mixing (1–5, 7–13)
- Phil Ramone – mixing (3, 7, 12)
- Charles Dye – mixing (6, 12)
- John Haag – mixing (9), additional engineer
- Patrice Levinsohn – additional engineer
- Scott Perry – additional engineer, assistant engineer
- Freddy Piñero Jr. – additional engineer
- Ron Taylor – additional engineer
- Marcelo Añez – assistant engineer
- Sean Chambers – assistant engineer
- Sebastian Krys – assistant engineer
- Mark Krieg – additional assistant engineer
- Steven Robillard – additional assistant engineer

== Charts ==
Chart (1994)	Peak position
Australian Albums (ARIA)	37
Dutch Albums (Album Top 100)	71
German Albums (Offizielle Top 100)	26
Swedish Albums (Sverigetopplistan)	46
Swiss Albums (Schweizer Hitparade)	21
UK Albums (OCC)	19
US Billboard 200	21

== Sales and certifications ==
Region	Certification	Certified units/sales
Canada (Music Canada)	Platinum	100,000^{^}
United States (RIAA)	Platinum	1,000,000^{^}
^{^} Shipments figures based on certification alone.
