= Rock & Roll Band =

1976 song by Boston

Song by Boston

from the album Boston
- Released: August 25, 1976
- Recorded: October 1975
- Genre: Hard rock; boogie rock
- Length: 3:00
- Label: Epic
- Songwriters: Tom Scholz; Brad Delp
- Producers: John Boylan; Tom Scholz

"Rock & Roll Band" is a song by American rock band Boston written by main songwriter and guitarist Tom Scholz, with help from lead vocalist Brad Delp. The song appears on the band's 1976 self-titled debut studio album.

== Background ==
Scholz had begun writing "Rock & Roll Band" in the early 1970s. It was one of many songs Scholz worked on in his basement in 1974 and 1975 before Boston got its record contract, five of which eventually appeared on the Boston album. The "Rock & Roll Band" demo was finished in 1974, along with three of the six. The song was played by Paul Ahern for Charlie McKenzie to interest him in the yet unnamed band that was to become Boston. Shortly after, Ahern and McKenzie signed on as the band's managers.

The drum parts of "Rock & Roll Band" and other early Boston songs were developed by Jim Masdea, but this is the only song on the Boston album on which Masdea plays drums. Scholz plays clavinet and all the guitar parts, including bass guitar, and Brad Delp sings vocals. Boston consistently opened with "Rock & Roll Band" while playing at live concerts.

== Lyrical content ==
"Rock & Roll Band" is one of several Boston songs with the theme of making music and how music makes them feel. According to AllMusic critic Vik Iyengar, it is about the band's "rise from a bar band." In The Rough Guide to Rock, Charles Bottomley calls the song Boston's "self-description." Lyrics supporting this statement include:

Well we were just another band out of Boston
On the road to try to make ends meet
Playin' all the bars, sleepin' in our cars
And we practiced right on out in the street.

However, the song's lyrics do exaggerate the band's story, as they spent years of work and rejection to get their recording contract, rather than being suddenly discovered by a record executive who happened to catch a show. Boston's official website acknowledges that the song is "a charming bit of group self-mythology." Scholz himself admits that the song is "pure fantasy" since the band never played live or toured at the time the song was written. According to Scholz, the song was inspired by Masdea telling him of playing in bands in Hyannis, Massachusetts and dreaming of being discovered. Scholz decided to write a song "about everybody who dreams about that," even though "that's not what happened with Boston." Todd Maternowski claims that the band "set a precedent when they wrote the song 'Rock and Roll Band,' about the gritty life of an up-and-coming musician, despite never actually having experienced anything of the sort and getting a major record contract before their first live gig."

== Critical reception ==
Billy Baker of the Boston Globe called "Rock & Roll Band" "one of the biggest rock anthems of the 1970s." Scott Tady of Beaver County Times described "Rock & Roll Band," "Smokin'" and Boston's first four singles as having "helped set the foundation for classic-rock radio." Boston Globe's Sarah Rodman credited "Rock & Roll Band" as one of the songs that helped drive sales of Boston to over 17 million copies. The New Rolling Stone Album Guide called "Rock & Roll Band" a "cleaned-up boogey [sic] crowd pleaser..." Jamie Reno of San Diego magazine described it as an "infectious flick-your Bic staple." MTV's Gil Kaufman noted that the song is a "rock-radio staple." Guitar World states that when the radio plays "Rock & Roll Band" "few can resist indulging in fits of fleet-fingered air guitar and a spirited falsetto sing-along." In describing "the absolute perfection of every song" on Boston's debut album, Brian Thorpe Ferris claimed that "even the fake, cheering crowd on 'Rock & Roll Band' sounds authentic" Entertainment Weekly writer Chris Willman noted that, like all the other songs from Boston, "Rock & Roll Band" "received sizable FM radio airplay" upon its release, and that as of 2007 the song is "still all over the [radio] bandwidth." Willman did claim that he considers the song's lyrics to be cringe-worthy. Writing in 2008, Kevin Smith of the Arizona Daily Star described it as a "radio standard." In 2011, the radio station Q107 rated "Rock & Roll Band" as the #439 song of all time. Ultimate Classic Rock critic Michael Gallucci rated it Boston's 6th best song, praising the band's playing like they are "seasoned vets." Classic Rock History critic Brian Kachejian also rated it as Boston's 6th best song.

== Other appearances ==
The New Duncan Imperials covered "Rock & Roll Band" on their 1993 EP We're in a Band. A downloadable version of the song is available for the video game Rock Band. It is also available for Guitar Hero World Tour.

== Personnel ==
- Tom Scholz – rhythm guitar, lead guitar, bass guitar, clavinet
- Jim Masdea – drums
- Brad Delp – vocals
