= Foreplay/Long Time =

1977 single by Boston

"Foreplay"/"Long Time"

Single by Boston

from the album Boston
- Released: 1976
- Recorded: 1975–1976
- Genre: Hard rock; arena rock; progressive rock
- Length: 7:47 (2:25 "Foreplay" intro alone)
- Label: Epic
- Songwriter: Tom Scholz
- Producers: John Boylan; Tom Scholz

Audio
- "Foreplay"/"Long Time" on YouTube

"Long Time"

Single by Boston

from the album Boston
- B-side: "Let Me Take You Home Tonight"
- Released: January 7, 1977
- Genre: Hard rock; arena rock
- Length: 3:05
- Label: Epic
- Songwriter: Tom Scholz
- Producers: John Boylan; Tom Scholz

Boston singles chronology
"More Than a Feeling" (1976)	"Long Time" (1977)	"Peace of Mind" (1977)

Audio sample
- "Long Time": file; help

"Foreplay"/"Long Time" is a suite by the American rock band Boston, written by Tom Scholz. It appears on their 1976 debut album Boston, and "Long Time" is their second single for Epic Records. The song combines an instrumental introduction, "Foreplay", with the main song "Long Time", generally played as one on the radio and listed as one track on the album. "Long Time" peaked at No. 22 on the US Billboard Hot 100 the week ending March 5, 1977. It reached the Top 10 in Canada, peaking at No. 9. The standalone "Foreplay" was released as the B-side of Boston's next single "Peace of Mind", which was released in April.

In an interview for the Best of Boston CD, Scholz said that "Foreplay" was the first song he ever recorded, and he did this on a two-track machine in his basement. Scholz also stated that it was the first piece of music he ever wrote, and that he wrote it as far back as 1969.

An alternate mix of the song is available on the Epic Records Promo LP It's a Knockout. It was a sampler LP of artists that had releases coming up in 1976. This version has various differences in the mix and effects and also includes extra lyrics towards the end of the song. This version has never been available officially anywhere else.

Scholz originally sang all the vocal parts to "Long Time" in his basement during the making of the demo album, but his friend Brad Delp was invited to sing, and proved to be superior. Delp's voice is the only one heard on the 1976 studio recording. Scholz played several guitars, including lead electric guitar on "Foreplay", processed through a space pedal effect, and acoustic rhythm guitars on "Long Time". The three electric guitar solos on "Long Time" are played by Barry Goudreau.

== Reception ==
Rolling Stone described "Foreplay"/"Long Time" as "a perfect marriage of Led Zeppelin and Yes that plays musical chairs with electric and acoustic sounds." Los Angeles Times critic Robert Hilburn said that "Foreplay" is an effective "Yes/ELP keyboard exploration." Billboard said it had similar catchiness to its predecessor Boston single "More Than a Feeling" due to its "spacey electronic fills and soaring, full bodied vocal harmonies." Cash Box said the single "cuts out the long keyboard instrumental while leaving the meat of the song intact" and "builds through a series of hand-clapping interludes, first on acoustic, then on electric guitar." Classic Rock critic Paul Elliott rated it as Boston's 6th greatest song and noted that another critic had described the song as "a perfect marriage of Yes and Led Zeppelin." Classic Rock History critic Brian Kachejian rated it as Boston's 3rd best song.

== Personnel ==
=== "Foreplay" ===
- Tom Scholz – organ, clavinet, lead guitar including "top secret space pedal effects"
- Sib Hashian – drums
- Barry Goudreau – rhythm guitar
- Fran Sheehan – bass guitar

=== "Long Time" ===
- Tom Scholz – acoustic guitar, bass guitar, organ, clavinet
- Brad Delp – vocals
- Sib Hashian – drums
- Barry Goudreau – lead and rhythm guitars

== Cover versions ==
- Rascal Flatts played a cover version of "Foreplay/Long Time" in concert, which was released on the album Rascal Flatts LIVE.
- Phish celebrated their concert July 12, 1999 at Great Woods in Mansfield, Massachusetts, by opening with "Foreplay/Long Time". They had covered a bluegrass arrangement earlier in their careers, but this was the first time they played the full electric version that is heard on the album.

== Charts ==
=== Weekly charts ===
Chart (1977)	Peak position
Canada Top Singles (RPM)	9
Germany (GfK)	39
US Billboard Hot 100	22
US Cash Box Top 100	4

=== Year-end charts ===
Chart (1977)	Position
Canada	95
US Cash Box Top 100	99
