= More Than a Feeling =

1976 single by Boston

Single by Boston

from the album Boston
- B-side: "Smokin'"
- Released: August 1976
- Recorded: October 1975 – April 1976
- Studio: Foxglove (Watertown, Massachusetts)
- Genre: Hard rock · pop rock
- Length: 4:45 (album version); 3:25 (single edit/video version)
- Label: Epic
- Songwriter: Tom Scholz
- Producers: John Boylan; Tom Scholz

Boston singles chronology
"More Than a Feeling" (1976)	"Long Time" (1977)

Music video
- "More Than a Feeling (Single edit)" on YouTube

"More Than a Feeling" is a song by the American rock band Boston, released as the lead single from the band's 1976 debut album Boston by Epic Records in August 1976, with "Smokin'" as the B-side. Tom Scholz wrote the song inspired by (and as a tribute to) The Left Banke's "Walk Away Renée". It entered the US Billboard Hot 100 on September 18 and peaked at number 5. The track is now a staple of classic rock radio, and in 2008, it was named the 39th-best hard rock song of all time by VH1. It was included in the Rock and Roll Hall of Fame lists of the "500 Songs That Shaped Rock and Roll" and was ranked number 212 on Rolling Stone's "500 Greatest Songs of All Time" list in 2021, updated from its previous position of number 500 on the 2004 version.

== Background and writing ==
"More than a Feeling" took Scholz five years to complete. Scholz wrote the lyrics based on the idea of losing someone close, and on the way in which music can connect a person to memories of the past. Though not based on any specific event in Scholz's life, he did take the name Marianne from his cousin. It is one of six songs (five of which eventually appeared on the Boston album) that he worked on in his basement from 1968 to 1975, before Boston got its record contract. The drum parts were originally developed by Jim Masdea, although Sib Hashian played the drums on the official release. The song is in compound AABA form.

== Content ==
"More Than a Feeling"
Chorus, with lead-in

The Book of Rock Lists suggests that the chorus riff may itself be a subtle homage to the Kingsmen's classic, Louie Louie. Scholz has stated in multiple interviews his fondness for the James Gang, and in particular that band's 1970s album, James Gang Rides Again. Accordingly, the signature riff for More than a Feeling bears a resemblance to that composed by Joe Walsh for the track Tend My Garden. Scholz credits "Walk Away Renée" by The Left Banke as the song's main inspiration - in fact, that is the "old song they used to play" that the singer gets "lost" in.

Boston's website says the song is about "the power an old song can have in your life", with Scholz elaborating that "it was sort of a bittersweet ballad." Ultimate Classic Rock critic Michael Gallucci points out that this is a common theme in Boston songs.

The lyrics express the author's discontent with the present and his yearning for a former love named Marianne, whose memory is strongly evoked by an old familiar song. In an interview Scholz was asked, "Who is Marianne?" He replied, "There actually is a Marianne. She wasn't my girlfriend." He explained that when he was 8 or 9 years old he had a much older cousin who he thought was the most beautiful girl he had ever seen and that he was "secretly in love" with her (laughs), but he has also stated that the lyrics were inspired by his emotions after a school love affair ended, and were influenced by the lyrics of "Walk Away Renée". Maximum Guitar author Andy Aledort pointed out that the guitar chord progression of G-D/F♯-Em7-D that follows the line "I see my Marianne walking away" (at the one minute and fifteen seconds mark) also comes from "Walk Away Renée" (they are the opening sequence). Aledort also explains that the guitar solo is unusual in that it incorporates mordents and inverted mordents, which are more typically used in baroque music.

== Reception ==
Billboard described "More Than a Feeling" as an "electric guitar-dominated rocker...made commercial with an accessible beat and hand-clap backup and smooth, soaring vocals." Cash Box said "it's a hard-rock offering, but has a sophisticated melody that makes good use of minor chords" and has "attractive" unison guitar work and powerful vocals. Record World said that with the song Boston "shows it is adept at rocking with a heavy metal fury, yet at the same time builds a dynamic tension around the melody of the tune." Classic Rock critic Paul Elliott rated it as "Boston's all-time greatest song". Los Angeles Times critic Robert Hilburn called it a "marvelously appealing pop-rock single" and said that it ranks with Queen's "Bohemian Rhapsody" as one of the best singles of 1976. Hilburn also said that the song combines "the graceful splendor and rousing melodic hooks of the Moody Blues, the strident guitar impact of Queen's Brian May and some of the romantic pop-rock consciousness of Eric Carmen and the old Raspberries."

Guitar World states that when the radio plays "More Than a Feeling", "few can resist indulging in fits of fleet-fingered air guitar and a spirited falsetto sing-along." Rolling Stone Album Guide critic Paul Evans states that "as slick as it sounds, 'More Than a Feeling' strikes an uncommonly resonant emotional note." Gallucci rated it Boston's greatest song, as did Classic Rock History critic Brian Kachejian. Ultimate Classic Rock critic Dave Swanson rated it the number-28 all-time classic rock song.

== Personnel ==
- Tom Scholz – electric and acoustic guitars, bass guitar
- Brad Delp – lead and backing vocals
- Sib Hashian – drums

=== Live ===
- Tom Scholz – lead and harmony electric guitars
- Brad Delp – lead vocals, acoustic guitar
- Barry Goudreau – rhythm electric guitar, backing vocals
- Fran Sheehan – bass guitar
- Sib Hashian – drums

== Charts ==
=== Weekly charts ===
Chart (1976–1977)	Peak position
Australia (Kent Music Report)	11
Belgium (VRT Top 30)	14
Belgium (Ultratop 50 Wallonia)	41
Belgium (Ultratop 50 Flanders)	16
Canada Top Singles (RPM)	4
Japan (Oricon)	68
Netherlands (Single Top 100)	13
New Zealand (Recorded Music NZ)	15
Switzerland (Schweizer Hitparade)	9
UK Singles (Official Charts)	22
US Billboard Hot 100	5
US Cash Box Top 100	4
West Germany (GfK)	15

Chart (2026)	Peak position
Ireland (IRMA)	94

=== Year-end charts ===
Chart (1977)	Position
Australia (Kent Music Report)	95
Canada Top Singles (RPM)	58
US Cash Box Top 100	83
West Germany (GfK)	76

== Certifications ==
Region	Certification	Certified units/sales
Denmark (IFPI Danmark)	Gold	45,000^{‡}
Germany (BVMI)	Gold	250,000^{‡}
Italy (FIMI)	Platinum	50,000^{‡}
New Zealand (RMNZ)	5× Platinum	150,000^{‡}
Spain (Promusicae)	Platinum	60,000^{‡}
United Kingdom (BPI)	2× Platinum	1,200,000^{‡}
United States (RIAA)	Gold	500,000^{*}
^{*} Sales figures based on certification alone.^{‡} Sales+streaming figures based on certification alone.

== Covers and use in politics and other media ==
- In 1992, when Nirvana performed their breakthrough single, "Smells Like Teen Spirit", at the Reading Festival, they incorporated part of "More Than a Feeling" at the beginning, a reference to the similarities between the two songs' main guitar riffs and as a response to the media's backlash over the riff being "borrowed." This part is included on the DVD version of Nirvana's live album Live at Reading.
- In 2008, Republican presidential candidate Mike Huckabee used the song to promote his campaign. Former Boston band member Barry Goudreau made appearances with Huckabee both live and on YouTube. In February 2008, Scholz wrote to Huckabee requesting that he stop using the song, stating: "While I'm flattered that you are fond of my song, I'm shocked that you would use it and the name Boston to promote yourself without my consent. Your campaign's use of 'More Than a Feeling', coupled with the representation of one of your supporters as a member 'of Boston' clearly implies that the band Boston, and specifically one of its members, has endorsed your candidacy, neither of which is true." Huckabee complied with Scholz's request, and videos featuring Barry Goudreau and the song were subsequently removed by the Huckabee campaign.
- The song was covered on Glee, as part of the New Directions Nationals setlist in the season 5 episode "City of Angels", with the songs included said to be favourites of Finn Hudson, honoring actor Cory Monteith, who died in July 2013.
- A cover by WaveGroup Sound was included as part of the soundtrack for the original Guitar Hero released in 2005, and it was later released as a master recording on Guitar Hero Smash Hits and Guitar Hero Live's GHTV.
- The song was made available to download on March 25, 2008, as a playable track in the Rock Band music video game series.
