= Si Tú Te Vas =

Si Tú Te Vas (Spanish: "if you go") may refer to:

== Music ==
- Si Tú Te Vas (album), 2008 album by Los Temerarios

=== Songs ===
- "Si Tú Te Vas" (Enrique Iglesias song), 1995
- "Si Tú Te Vas" (Paulina Rubio song), 2002
- "Si Tú Te Vas", by Camilo Sesto, 1977
- "Si Tú Te Vas", by Juan Luis Guerra y 440 from the album Mudanza y Acarreo, 1985, covered by Los Melódicos in 1989
- "Si Tú Te Vas", by Jennifer Peña, 1996
- "Si Tú Te Vas", by Los Temerarios from the album Si Tú Te Vas, 2008
- "Si Tú Te Vas", by Tierra Cali, 2009
- "Si Tú Te Vas", by Tini from Tini, 2009
- "Si Tú Te Vas", by Ximena Sariñana from ¿Dónde Bailarán las Niñas?, 2018

== See also ==
- Si Te Vas (disambiguation)
- Te Vas (disambiguation)
