= Smokin' (song) =

1976 song by Boston

Song by Boston

from the album Boston
- A-side: "More Than a Feeling"
- Released: August 25, 1976 (album); September 1976 (single)
- Recorded: Spring 1976
- Genre: Hard rock; boogie rock; art rock; progressive rock
- Length: 4:22
- Label: Epic
- Songwriters: Brad Delp; Tom Scholz
- Producers: John Boylan; Tom Scholz

Audio
- "Smokin'" on YouTube

"Smokin'" is a song by American rock band Boston, released from the band's debut album Boston (1976) as the B-side to the band's first single, "More Than a Feeling". "Smokin'" was written by the band leader, guitarist and main songwriter Tom Scholz and lead vocalist Brad Delp.

Like many other Boston songs, "Smokin'" has become a rock radio staple.

== Background ==
"Smokin'" was a collaborative effort between Tom Scholz and Brad Delp, whom at the time Scholz had recently hired. It is one of the two songs on the first Boston LP not written by Scholz alone. It was one of the songs Scholz started working on in the early 1970s in his basement, several years before the band had got a record contract. An early version of the song written and recorded in 1973, titled "Shakin", appears from the Mother's Milk Sessions. This tape reveals that originally, the song had a different meaning.

== Critical reception ==
Los Angeles Times critic Robert Hilburn described "Smokin'" as a "flat, uninspired ZZ Topish boogie." Writing in 2008, Kevin Smith of the Arizona Daily Star described "Smokin'" as a "radio standard." MusicTap's review of Boston noted that "Smokin'" as one of the songs from the album to become an FM radio staple, helping the album sell 17 million copies. Scott Tady of Beaver County Times described "Smokin'," "Rock and Roll Band" and Boston's first four singles as having "helped set the foundation for classic-rock radio." Denise Lavoie of the Associated Press singled out "Smokin'" and "More Than a Feeling" as the hits for which Boston is best known. Classic Rock critic Paul Elliott rated it as Boston's 4th greatest song, calling it "a flat-out, high-octane blaster." Classic Rock History critic Brian Kachejian rated it as Boston's 4th best song, particularly praising the organ solo.

The New Rolling Stone Album Guide called "Smokin'" a "cleaned-up boogey [sic] crowd pleaser..." Scholz described the beginning of the song as being a vaguely ZZ Top-ish boogie. Ultimate Classic Rock critic Michael Gallucci praised the song's "boogie groove" that persists throughout the song. Gallucci rated it Boston's 7th greatest song. The lyrics extol music, parties and marijuana.

== In popular culture ==
"Smokin'" is featured in the 2004 game Grand Theft Auto: San Andreas on the in-game radio station K-DST, the movie The Virgin Suicides and in the 2016 South Park episodes "Skank Hunt" and "The End of Serialization as We Know It". It also appears on the WWE 2K18 soundtrack and on the 2011 film Zookeeper. It is featured in the 2021 film Boss Level.

After the September 11 attacks, Clear Channel included it on a list of songs that were not recommended for broadcasting.

== Personnel ==
- Brad Delp – lead vocals
- Tom Scholz – guitar, bass guitar, clavinet, organ
- Sib Hashian – drums

== Anthrax version ==
"Smokin'"

Song by Anthrax

from the album Anthems
- Released: March 15, 2013
- Genre: Hard rock
- Length: 4:20
- Label: Megaforce
- Songwriters: Brad Delp; Tom Scholz
- Producers: Anthrax; Jay Ruston; Rob Caggiano

A recording of "Smokin'" by the American band Anthrax was released on their 2013 covers EP Anthems. The song premiered online on March 15, 2013 prior to the album's release on March 19, 2013.

=== Personnel ===
==== Anthrax ====
- Joey Belladonna – lead vocals
- Scott Ian – rhythm guitar, backing vocals
- Frank Bello – bass, backing vocals
- Charlie Benante – drums
- Rob Caggiano – lead guitar

==== Additional personnel ====
- Fred Mandel – keyboards
