= Te Vas (disambiguation) =

"Te Vas" is a 2019 song by Inna

"Te Vas" may also refer to:

- "Te Vas", a 1978 song by Los Bukis from Me Siento Solo
- "Te Vas", a 2002 song by Estanis Mogollón, covered in 2008 by Américo
- "Te Vas", a song by Héctor el Father from the album The Bad Boy, 2006
- "Te Vas", a 2016 song by Ozuna
- "Te Vas", a song by Ricky Martin from the album Música + Alma + Sexo, 2011

== See also ==
- Si Te Vas (disambiguation)
- Si Tú Te Vas (disambiguation)
