= If You Go (song) =

1994 single by Jon Secada

Single by Jon Secada

from the album Heart, Soul & a Voice
- B-side: "Si te vas"
- Released: April 26, 1994
- Length: 4:33
- Label: SBK
- Songwriters: Jon Secada; Miguel Morejon
- Producers: Emilio Estefan; Lawrence Dermer; Jon Secada

Jon Secada singles chronology
"I'm Free" (1993)	"If You Go" (1994)	"Whipped" (1994)

Music video
- "If You Go" on YouTube

"If You Go" is a song written by Cuban-born American singer-songwriter Jon Secada and Miguel Morejon, recorded for Secada's second English-language album, Heart, Soul & a Voice (1994). The song's lyrics detail a desire that a female subject not leave the singer, for, if she does, "there'll be something missing in [his] life". A Spanish version, "Si te vas", was also released for the Spanish-language market.

The song was released as a single on April 26, 1994, by SBK Records, peaking at number five and number ten on the US Cash Box Top 100 and Billboard Hot 100 charts respectively. In Canada, it topped The Record's singles chart and the RPM Adult Contemporary chart. The music video for the Spanish version was nominated for a Lo Nuestro Award for Video of the Year at the 7th Lo Nuestro Awards. Secada sung "If You Go" at the 1994 FIFA World Cup opening ceremony.

== Critical reception ==
Larry Flick from Billboard magazine wrote, "Any similarity between this first offering from Secada's new Heart, Soul & a Voice and his first top 40 hit, 'Just Another Day', is probably anything but a coincidence. From the swelling choir of inspirational backing vocals to the shuffling pop beat, this song oozes with familiarity. That is not likely to stop radio programmers or consumers from gobbling this up in a flash. Secada's flexing vocal has a degree of sincerity that contributes to making this a guilty pleasure."

== Track listings ==
- US and Australian CD single
1. "If You Go" – 3:45
2. "Si te vas" – 3:45
3. "If You Go / Si te vas" (Spanglish) – 3:45
4. "If You Go" (West End mix) – 6:28
5. "If You Go" (Clapapella mix) – 3:17
- US and Canadian cassette single
1. "If You Go" – 3:45
2. "Si te vas" – 3:45
- Japanese mini-CD single
1. "If You Go"
2. "If You Go" (Spanish version)
3. "If You Go / Si te vas" (Spanglish version)
- UK CD single
1. "If You Go"
2. "If You Go" (Spanish version)
3. "If You Go / Si te vas" (Spanglish version)
4. "If You Go" (dance mix)
- UK 7-inch and cassette single; European CD single
1. "If You Go" (radio edit)
2. "If You Go" (Spanish version)
- European maxi-CD single
1. "If You Go" (radio edit)
2. "If You Go" (Spanish version)
3. "If You Go" (dance mix)
4. "La La La" (album version)

== Charts ==
=== Weekly charts ===
Chart (1994–1995)	Peak position
Australia (ARIA)	47
Canada Retail Singles (The Record)	1
Canada Top Singles (RPM)	3
Canada Adult Contemporary (RPM)	1
Europe (Eurochart Hot 100)	78
Europe (European Hit Radio)	6
Germany (GfK)	41
Iceland (Íslenski Listinn Topp 40)	11
Israel (Israeli Singles Chart)	4
Netherlands (Dutch Top 40)	35
Netherlands (Single Top 100)	39
Scottish Singles Sales (Official Charts)	56
UK Singles (Official Charts)	39
UK Airplay (Music Week)	26
US Billboard Hot 100	10
US Adult Contemporary (Billboard)	2
US Adult Pop Airplay (Billboard)	36
US Hot Latin Songs (Billboard) "Si te vas"	1
US Pop Airplay (Billboard)	5
US Rhythmic Airplay (Billboard)	25
US Cash Box Top 100	5

=== Year-end charts ===
Chart (1994)	Position
Canada Top Singles (RPM)	18
Canada Adult Contemporary (RPM)	5
Europe (European Hit Radio)	31
Iceland (Íslenski Listinn Topp 40)	87
US Billboard Hot 100	23
US Adult Contemporary (Billboard)	6
US Hot Latin Tracks (Billboard) "Si te vas"	5
US Cash Box Top 100	12

Chart (1995)	Position
US Adult Contemporary (Billboard)	32

=== Decade-end charts ===
Chart (1990–1999)	Position
Canada (Nielsen SoundScan)	37

== Release history ==
Region	Version	Date	Format(s)	Label(s)	Ref(s).
United States	"If You Go"	April 25–26, 1994	Top 40; adult contemporary; urban radio	SBK	
United States	Both	April 26, 1994	CD	SBK	
United Kingdom	"If You Go"	May 2, 1994	7-inch vinyl; CD; cassette	SBK	
United States	"Si te vas"	May 10, 1994	Latino radio	SBK	
United States	Both	May 24, 1994	CD	SBK	
Japan	"If You Go"	June 17, 1994	Mini-CD	SBK	
Australia	"If You Go"	June 27, 1994	CD; cassette	SBK	

== See also ==
- Lo Nuestro Award for Video of the Year
