= Tommy DeCarlo =

American singer (1965–2026)

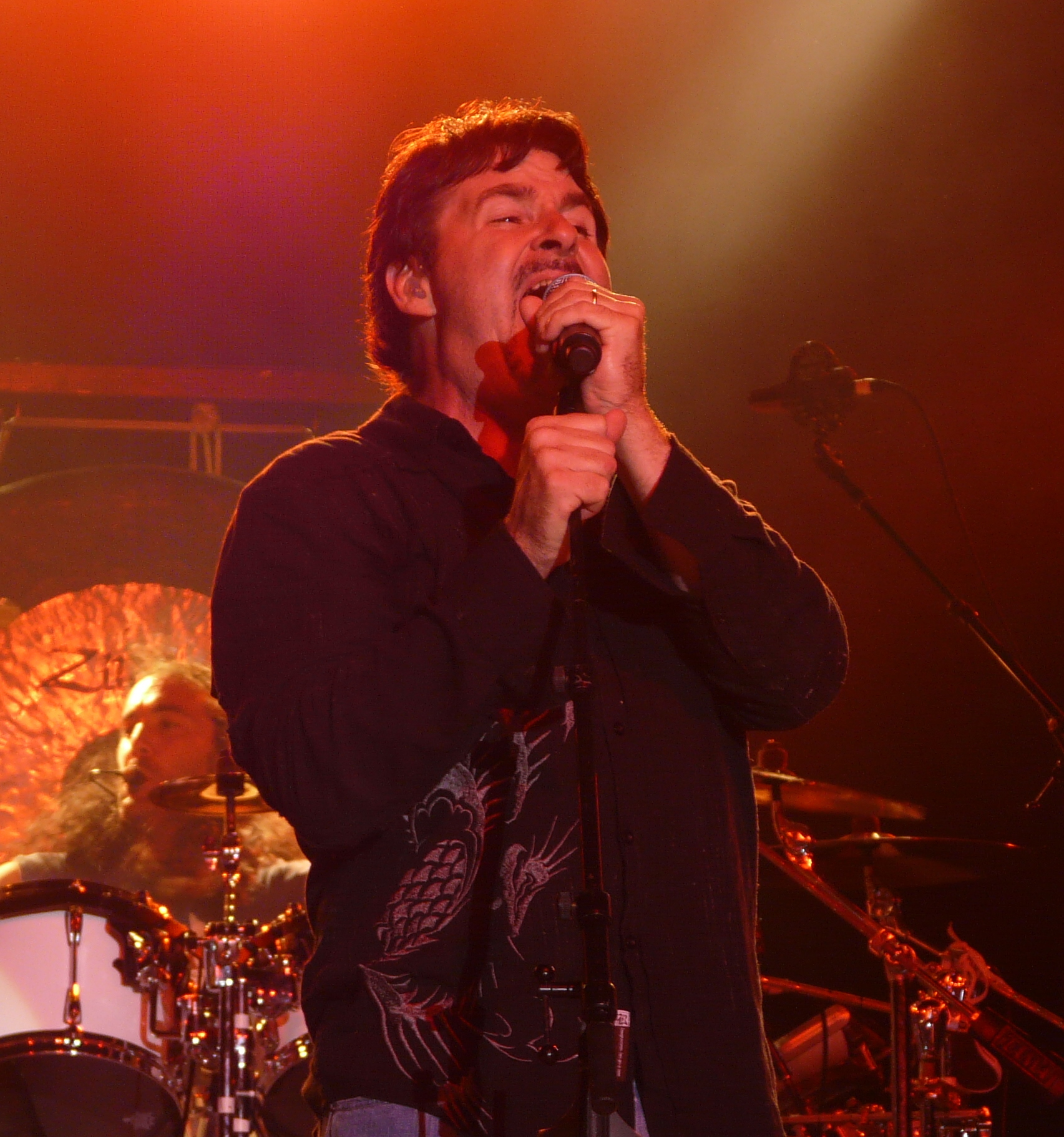
- DeCarlo performing with Boston in 2008

Background information
- Born: April 23, 1965; Utica, New York, U.S.
- Died: March 9, 2026 (aged 60) Charlotte, North Carolina, U.S.
- Genres: Rock; hard rock
- Occupations: Singer; musician
- Instruments: Vocals; keyboards; percussion
- Years active: 1986–2026
- Formerly of: Boston

Tommy DeCarlo (April 23, 1965 – March 9, 2026) was an American singer who was the lead vocalist for the rock band Boston from 2007 until his death from brain cancer in 2026.

== Life and career ==
DeCarlo was born and raised in Utica, New York. He discovered and became a fan of Boston at the age of 12. Years later, he began writing his own music and in the 1990s began recording covers of himself singing his favorite Boston songs.

DeCarlo struggled in school and, on the advice of his principal, dropped out during his junior year. He lived at home and worked in Pizza Hut as a dishwasher. In his early 20s, due to a turbulent relationship with his parents, he had also lived in a homeless shelter. After moving to Florida, he took night classes and obtained his high school diploma.

In March 2007, original Boston lead singer Brad Delp died by suicide at the age of 55. To honor Delp, DeCarlo wrote and recorded an original song about his favorite vocalist as well as recording some Boston covers, "Don't Look Back" and "Smokin". His daughter suggested he post the songs on a MySpace page that she helped him set up. He then decided to send his MySpace page link to Boston management. Not long after, he was contacted by Boston founding member Tom Scholz. At the time, DeCarlo was working at a Charlotte, North Carolina-area Home Depot as a credit manager. From 2007 until his death in 2026, he was the lead vocalist (or co-lead vocalist) for every subsequent touring lineup of Boston and provided lead vocals on select songs on Life, Love & Hope (2013), an album which began production prior to Delp's death. In 2008, as DeCarlo was just getting noticed, The Boston Herald wrote, "longtime fan and Home Depot recruit Tommy DeCarlo did a phenomenal job on vocals, consistently nailing the money notes and conjuring an uncanny likeness to Delp’s overall style and tone." After the 2008 tour, for which DeCarlo had to take 3 months off from Home Depot, he quit and started a band with his son, also singing with Boston, eventually taking over solo lead vocals.

In November 2021, DeCarlo recorded and released the audiobook, Unlikely Rockstar – The Tommy DeCarlo Story, in which he narrates his life events from birth through his first performance with the band Boston in 2007. The recording of the book occurred throughout 2020 and 2021.

=== DeCarlo ===
DeCarlo formed the band Decarlo (stylized DECARLO) with his son, guitarist Tommy DeCarlo Jr. in 2012.

The band signed a deal with Frontier Records Srl in October 2018 and released their first album on January 24, 2020, called Lightning Strikes Twice which earned them a featured article in Billboard as 2020 Grammy Award contenders.

The title track "Lightning Strikes Twice" was released on October 28, 2019, the second single "There She Goes" was released on November 21, 2019, and the third and final single "A Better Day" was released on January 8, 2020. In 2022, DeCarlo signed a second record deal, this time a solo contract, with Frontier Records for Dancing in the Moonlight (released December 2022). DeCarlo recently toured the U.S. and Canada with his son and guitarist Tommy DeCarlo Jr.

=== Death ===
DeCarlo was diagnosed with brain cancer in September 2025. He died at the age of 60 on March 9, 2026, exactly 19 years from the day of Delp's death.

== Personal life ==
DeCarlo and his wife Annie had two children.

== Discography ==
=== Studio albums ===
- Dancing in the Moonlight (2022)

=== with Boston ===
- Life, Love & Hope (2013) (Lead vocals on "Life, Love & Hope", "Someday", "You Gave Up on Love (2.0)", "The Way You Look Tonight")

=== with DeCarlo ===
- Lightning Strikes Twice (2020)

Singles

- "Lightning Strikes Twice" (2019)
- "There She Goes" (2019)
- "A Better Day" (2020)
