= Si Te Vas (album) =

Studio album by Jon Secada
- Released: June 28, 1994
- Genre: Latin pop; R&B
- Length: 47:28
- Label: EMI

Jon Secada chronology
Heart, Soul & a Voice (1994)	Si Te Vas (1994)	Amor (1995)

Professional ratings
Review scores
Source	Rating
Allmusic	3/5 stars

Si Te Vas is the fourth studio album by Cuban singer Jon Secada, and the second Spanish album, released in 1994. It reached number five of Billboard's Top Latin Albums. The singles "Si Te Vas" and "Sólo Tu Imagen" peaked at number one and number 13, respectively, on the Hot Latin Tracks chart. "Si Te Vas" and "Tuyo" appeared in Spanish and English on the corresponding English album. Every other track except "No Te Importa" appeared on the same album as an English version only.

== Track listing ==
1. "Quiero Más" (Whipped)
2. "Tuyo" (Take Me)
3. "Si Te Vas" (If You Go)
4. "Pide Mi Vida" (Good Feelings)
5. "A Donde Voy" (Where Do I Go from You)
6. "Suave" (Fat Chance)
7. "Enloquecido" (Stay)
8. "La, La, La" (Spanish version)
9. "Sólo Tu Imagen" (Mental Picture)
10. "No Te Importa"
11. "Ciego de Amor" (Eyes of a Fool)

== Charts ==
Chart (1994)	Peak position
US Top Latin Albums (Billboard)	5
US Latin Pop Albums (Billboard)	2
