= Beth Cohen (musician) =

American rock musician (born 1970)

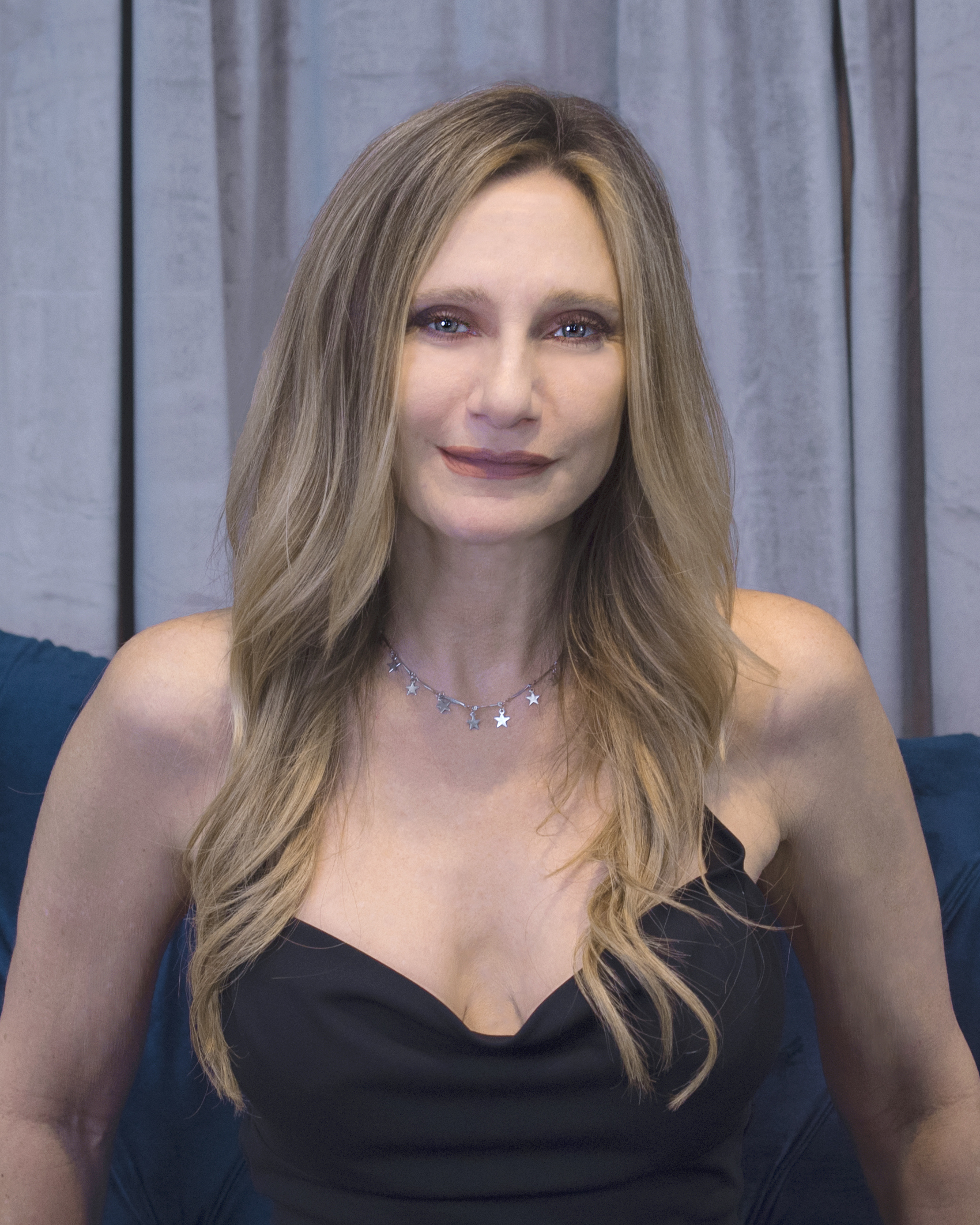

Background information
- Born: 1970 (age 55–56); Long Island, New York, U.S.
- Genres: Arena rock; progressive rock; hard rock; rock
- Occupations: Musician; songwriter
- Instruments: Vocals; keyboards; guitar; flute
- Member of: Boston
- Formerly of: Barry Gibb/Bee Gees, Jon Secada, Chayanne, Barbra Streisand, Pink, Teddy Geiger, Alejandro Sans, Paulina Rubio
- Website: beth-cohen.com

Beth Cohen (born 1970 on Long Island, New York) is an American rock musician. She has toured with Barry Gibb and the Bee Gees, Jon Secada, and Chayanne. She has also appeared on stage with Julio Iglesias, Kelly Clarkson, and Isaac Hayes. She has done session work for Jon Secada, Barbra Streisand, Boston, Pink, Teddy Geiger, Alejandro Sanz, and Paulina Rubio. She joined the rock band Boston in 2015.
