= Boston (band) =

American rock band

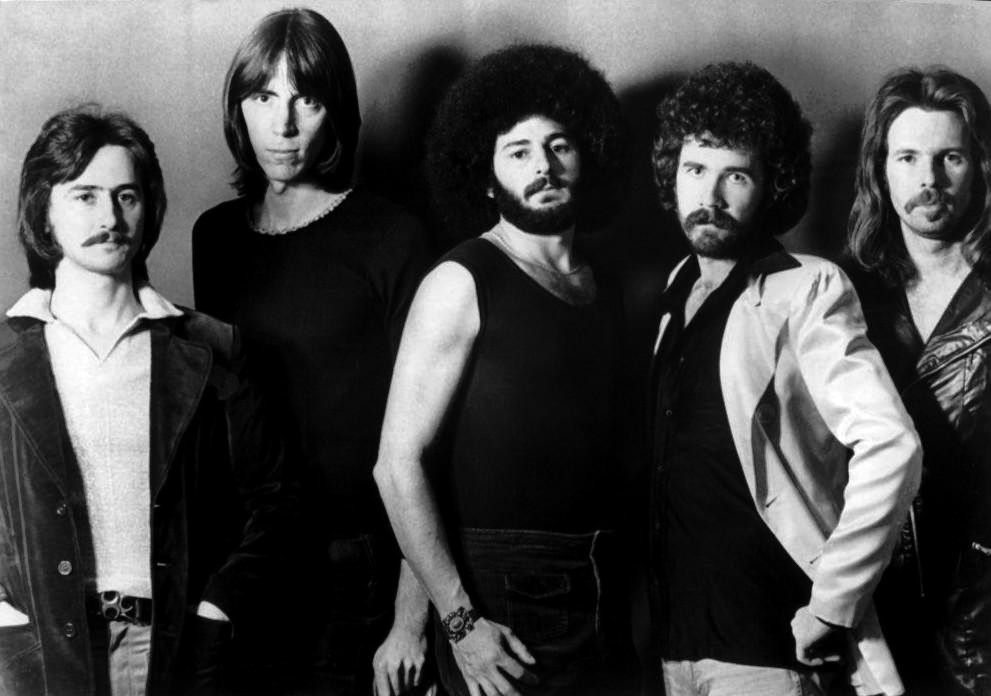
- Boston in 1976. From left to right: Barry Goudreau, Tom Scholz, Sib Hashian, Brad Delp, Fran Sheehan.

Background information
- Origin: Boston, Massachusetts, U.S.
- Genres: Hard rock; arena rock
- Works: Discography
- Years active: 1975–present
- Labels: Epic; MCA; Artemis; Frontiers
- Spinoffs: Orion the Hunter; Beatlejuice; RTZ
- Members: Tom Scholz; Gary Pihl; Curly Smith; Jeff Neal; Tracy Ferrie; Beth Cohen
- Past members: Brad Delp; Jim Masdea; Fran Sheehan; Sib Hashian; Barry Goudreau; David Sikes; Doug Huffman; Fran Cosmo; Anton Cosmo; Anthony Citrinite; Tommy DeCarlo; Michael Sweet; David Victor; Mack Jackson; Kimberley Dahme; Brad Jones
- Website: bandboston.com

Boston is an American rock band formed in 1975 in Boston, Massachusetts, by chief songwriter and composer Tom Scholz. The band's core members included multi-instrumentalist Scholz and lead vocalist Brad Delp, who remained the only constant members from 1975 to 1990, and from 1994 until Delp's suicide in 2007. Other musicians and members of the band varied largely across the group's lineup history.

Boston experienced significant commercial success during the 1970s and 1980s. The band's 1976 self-titled debut is one of the best-selling albums by an American rock band, being certified 17× Platinum by the RIAA as of 2025. Their best-known songs include "More Than a Feeling", "Peace of Mind", "Foreplay/Long Time", "Rock and Roll Band", "Smokin'", "Don't Look Back", "A Man I'll Never Be", "Hitch a Ride", "Party", "Amanda", and "Feelin' Satisfied". The band has sold more than 75 million records worldwide, including 31 million units sold in the United States, of which 17 million were the band's debut album, and seven million copies of the band's second studio album, Don't Look Back (1978), placing the group at number 63 among the world's best-selling music artists. Altogether, the band has released six studio albums in a career spanning over 51 years. Boston's recorded output has been minimal since the 1980s, with Third Stage (1986), Walk On (1994), Corporate America (2002), and Life, Love & Hope (2013) all being released several years apart. While Boston remains officially active, they have not performed live since 2017, though members have occasionally hinted at the possibility of a seventh studio album. Boston was ranked the 63rd-best hard rock artist by VH1.

Since Delp's death in 2007, a number of vocalists have filled in as replacements, including Stryper frontman and vocalist Michael Sweet. From 2007 until his death in 2026, Tommy DeCarlo was the group's lead singer. Other current members of the band include guitarist Gary Pihl, bassist Tracy Ferrie, drummer Jeff Neal, and vocalist/multi-instrumentalist Beth Cohen.

== History ==
=== Early years (1969–1975) ===
Tom Scholz first started writing music in 1969 while he was attending Massachusetts Institute of Technology (MIT), where he wrote an instrumental song, "Foreplay". While attending MIT, Scholz joined the band Freehold, where he met guitarist Barry Goudreau and drummer Jim Masdea, who would later become members of Boston. Vocalist Brad Delp was added to the collective in 1970. After graduating with a master's degree in mechanical engineering from MIT, Scholz worked for Polaroid, using his salary to build a recording studio in his basement, and to finance demonstration tapes recorded in professional recording studios. These early demo tapes were recorded with (at various times) Delp on vocals, Goudreau on guitar, Masdea on drums, and Scholz on guitar, bass, and keyboards. The demo tapes were sent to record companies, but received consistent rejections. In 1973, Scholz formed the band Mother's Milk with Delp, Goudreau, and Masdea. That group disbanded by 1974, but Scholz subsequently worked with Masdea and Delp to produce six new demos, including "More Than a Feeling", "Peace of Mind", "Rock and Roll Band", "Something About You" (then entitled "Life Isn't Easy"), "Hitch a Ride" (then entitled "San Francisco Day"), and "Don't Be Afraid". Scholz stated they finished four of the six by the end of 1974, and they finished "More Than a Feeling" and "Something About You" in 1975. Scholz played all the instruments on the demos, except for the drums, which were played by Masdea, and used self-designed pedals to create the desired guitar sounds.

This final demo tape attracted the attention of promoters Paul Ahern and Charlie McKenzie. Masdea left the band around this time. According to Scholz, the managers insisted that Masdea had to be replaced before the band could get a recording deal. Years later, Delp told journalist Chuck Miller: "[Jim] actually told me he was losing interest in playing drums. I know Tom felt very bad when the whole thing happened. And then, of course, we started getting some interest." Scholz and Delp signed a deal with Epic Records after Masdea's departure, thanks to Ahern and McKenzie. Before the deal could be finalized, the band had to do a live audition for the record-company executives. The duo recruited Goudreau on guitar, bassist Fran Sheehan, and drummer Sib Hashian to create a performing unit that could replicate Scholz's richly layered recordings on stage. According to Scholz, Masdea had insisted on performing a drum solo during the audition. Scholz stated, "The night before we auditioned I was going over a few things, trying to get everybody psyched up, and this guy says, 'You know, I don't think we're going to get this contract unless we have something flashy like a good drum solo right in the middle.' We'd only been working on arrangements and on this set for a month ... so we got Sib, whom I'd known for quite awhile." The showcase was a success and the band agreed to put out 10 albums over the next six years. In addition to the firing of Masdea, the record label insisted that Scholz re-record the demo tapes in a professional studio. However, Scholz wanted to record them in his basement studio so that he could work at his own pace. Scholz and producer John Boylan hatched a plan to send the rest of the band to Los Angeles to make the record label happy, while Scholz recorded most of Boston's debut album at home, with Masdea playing drums on the track "Rock and Roll Band" and Scholz playing the other instruments. The multitrack tapes were then brought to Los Angeles, where Delp added vocals and the album was mixed by Boylan. Then, the band was named "Boston", by suggestion of Boylan and engineer Warren Dewey.

=== Boston and Don't Look Back (1976–1978) ===
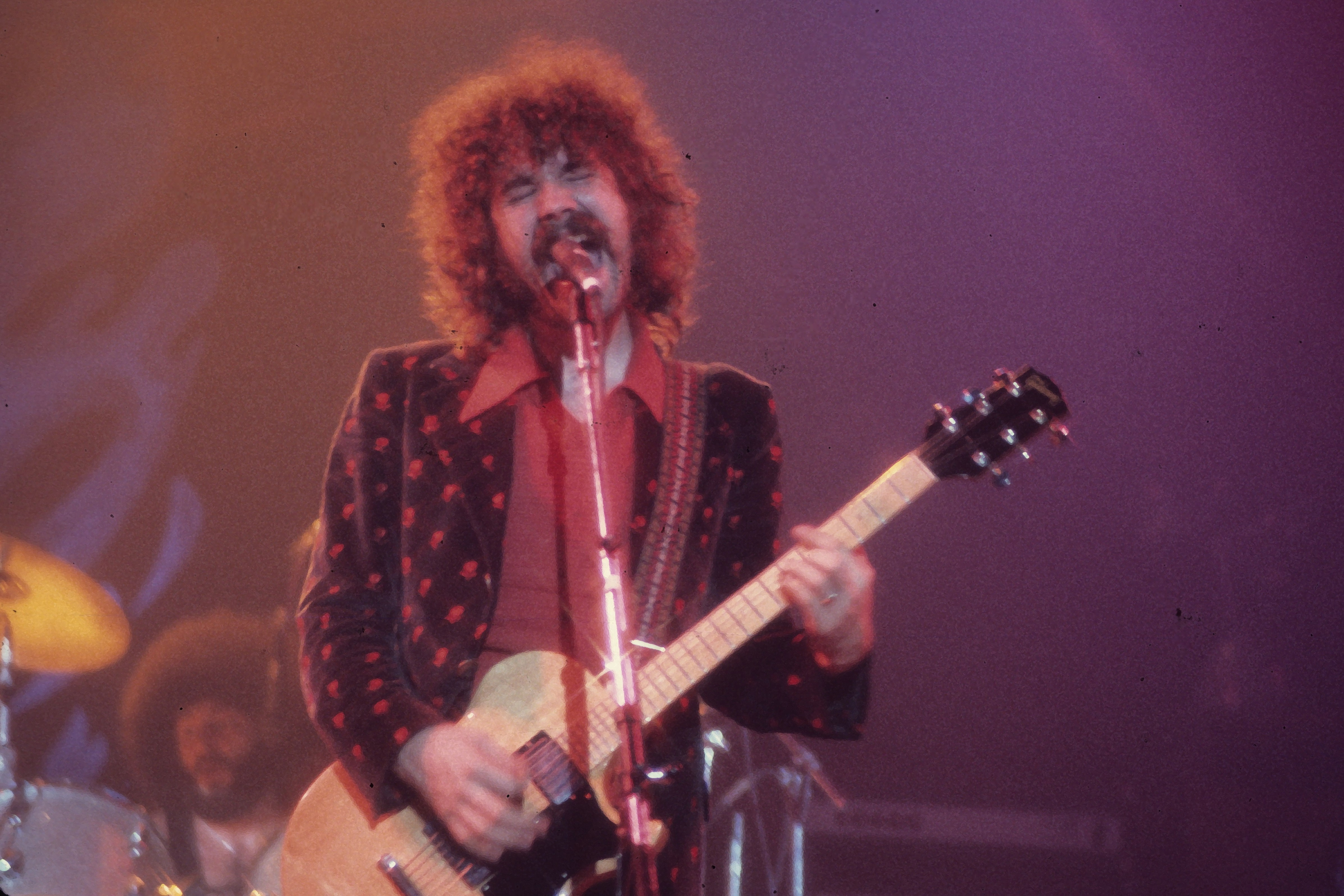
Brad Delp, the original lead singer: Along with Scholz, Delp was the only other person signed to Epic Records as Boston.

The debut album, Boston, released on August 25, 1976, ranks as one of the best-selling debut albums in U.S. history, with over 17 million copies sold.

During the late summer and early fall of 1976, the record sales brought Boston publicity, but Cameron Crowe later told in Rolling Stone of "a conscious effort to de-emphasize Scholz as the total mastermind behind Boston." After opening for Black Sabbath, Blue Öyster Cult, Foghat, and others in the fall, the band embarked on a headlining tour in the winter and spring of 1976–1977 to support the album. This helped establish Boston as one of rock's top acts within a short time, and they were nominated for a Grammy Award as Best New Artist. Boston was the first band in history to make their New York City debut at Madison Square Garden.

The album spawned three singles, "More Than a Feeling", "Long Time", and "Peace of Mind", all of which made the national charts. The album peaked at number three on the Billboard 200 and remained on the charts for 132 weeks.

Despite having problems with his manager, Paul Ahern, being caught in the middle of a fight between Ahern and Ahern's business partner, Charles McKenzie, and doing most of the recording work alone, Scholz completed the second Boston album two years after the debut album's release. The second album, Don't Look Back, was released by Epic in August 1978. At the time, this was considered a long gap between albums, but Scholz still considered Don't Look Back to be a rush job and was unhappy with the album's second side in particular. Overall, Don't Look Back sold about half as well as the debut album, eventually selling over 7 million records.

Another tour followed (playing with the likes of AC/DC, Black Sabbath, Van Halen, Sammy Hagar, and the Doobie Brothers), and the album's title track became a top-five hit. Additionally, two other singles, "A Man I'll Never Be" and "Feelin' Satisfied", went top 40 and top 50, respectively. Despite the success, Scholz's relationship with Ahern completely deteriorated. Delayed by technical renovations to his studio, Scholz eventually began the process of working on Boston's third album, determined to complete the album at his own pace and keep it up to his own standard.

=== Solo projects and CBS lawsuit (1979–1985) ===
In late 1979, Scholz began writing new material, but Boston's former co-manager, Paul Ahern, argued that according to an agreement Scholz had signed years earlier with Ahern, Ahern owned a percentage of all songs Scholz wrote from that point on. Delayed further by the dispute, Scholz suggested that in the meantime, the individual members should work on whatever other projects they might be considering. Goudreau then decided to record a solo album that featured Boston members Delp, who contributed vocals and co-wrote songs on the album, and Sib Hashian, and which was recorded with the help of Paul Grupp, an engineer and producer familiar with Scholz's studio techniques. The album, released in 1980, was titled Barry Goudreau and featured the minor hit single "Dreams". Tension arose when CBS's marketing connected Goudreau's solo album to Boston's signature guitar sound, despite Scholz not having played at all on this album. Scholz objected to the ad copy, but it became irrelevant when Epic dropped promotion on Goudreau's album, citing lack of interest. After a meeting with Scholz, Goudreau was fired from the band in 1981. Brad Delp, at the same meeting, voiced his disapproval and told Scholz that he was quitting Boston, but that he would record and complete the tour for that album. Goudreau then formed Orion the Hunter. After the tour for "Third Stage" ended in 1988, Delp teamed up with Goudreau and recorded the Return to Zero LP.

While Scholz and Delp were recording new material for the third Boston album, CBS filed a $60 million lawsuit against Scholz, alleging breach of contract for failing to deliver a new Boston album on time. During this same period, Scholz founded his high-tech company Scholz Research & Development (SR&D), which made amplifiers and other musical electronic equipment. Its most famous product, the Rockman amplifier, was introduced in 1982.

The legal trouble slowed progress toward the completion of the next album, which took six years to record and produce. Joining Scholz in the album's development again were Delp and Jim Masdea. In 1985, guitarist Gary Pihl left Sammy Hagar's touring band to work with Scholz as both a musician and an SR&D executive. As CBS v. Scholz played out in court, CBS opted to withhold royalty payments to Scholz, hoping to force him to settle on unfavorable terms. The lawsuit's first round was eventually decided in Scholz's favor, and Scholz moved the band to MCA Records. The CBS case took seven years to run its course, and in April 1990, Scholz won.

=== Third Stage (1986–1988) ===
Despite the adversity, progress continued to be made on the third Boston album. A tape of one of the songs, "Amanda", leaked out of the studio in 1983. The song became the lead single when Third Stage was finally released on September 23, 1986. The album topped the Billboard 200, while the lead single "Amanda" went to number one on the Billboard Hot 100, and the subsequent singles "We're Ready" and "Can'tcha Say (You Believe in Me)" reached numbers 9 and 20, respectively. "Cool the Engines" also got significant airplay on rock radio. The album sold over 4 million copies.

The group headed off on tour to promote Third Stage in 1987 and 1988. Third Stage was played in sequence in its entirety during the shows, with expanded arrangements of some cuts. Boston opened with "Rock and Roll Band" and brought back the original drummer, Jim Masdea, to play drums for this one song. For the tour, the group was joined by Doug Huffman and David Sikes, both of whom stayed with the band into the mid-1990s.

=== Departure of Delp; Walk On (1989–1996) ===
After the Third Stage Tour in 1988, Delp left Boston and formed RTZ with Barry Goudreau, releasing the Return to Zero LP in July 1991. With Delp's departure, Scholz was then the last remaining original member. Before he left, Delp co-wrote with Scholz and David Sikes the song "Walk On", which eventually became the title track of the new album. Scholz eventually replaced Delp with vocalist Fran Cosmo, who had been in Goudreau's previous band Orion the Hunter and sang on Goudreau's 1980 solo album.

For the second album in a row, and for the second time in a decade, Scholz's work was delayed by renovations to his studio. In the end, eight years passed between Third Stage and Walk On, which was released in June 1994. Walk On was certified platinum by the RIAA, and reached number seven on the Billboard Top 200 Albums chart. Unlike Boston's previous albums, it failed to chart in the top five. It produced one hit single, "I Need Your Love", which was widely played on some rock radio stations. Wanting to tour the album, but finding that no one could sing the classic songs other than Delp, Scholz asked Delp to rejoin Boston at the end of 1994. Their first appearance was for two benefit shows at the House of Blues on December 12–13, 1994, in Cambridge. The band also handed a check for $5,000 to Globe Santa and another check for $5,000 to Operation Christmas in Fall River.

The group toured in the summer of 1995 with Cosmo and Delp combining vocals. By that time, drummer Huffman had been replaced by Curly Smith, who was previously with Jo Jo Gunne. Following the conclusion of the Livin' For You tour in 1995, Scholz announced that a greatest-hits album would be released. Initially planned for release in August 1996, the album was pushed back to a 1997 release date.

=== Greatest Hits and Corporate America (1997–2006) ===
Boston released a compilation album in 1997, titled simply Boston: Greatest Hits. The album featured all of the band's hit singles except "We're Ready", "Can'tcha Say (You Believe In Me)/Still In Love", and "I Need Your Love", but included three new songs, "Higher Power", "Tell Me", and an instrumental version of the "Star Spangled Banner". Smith and Sikes left the band in late 1997 and recorded an album together.

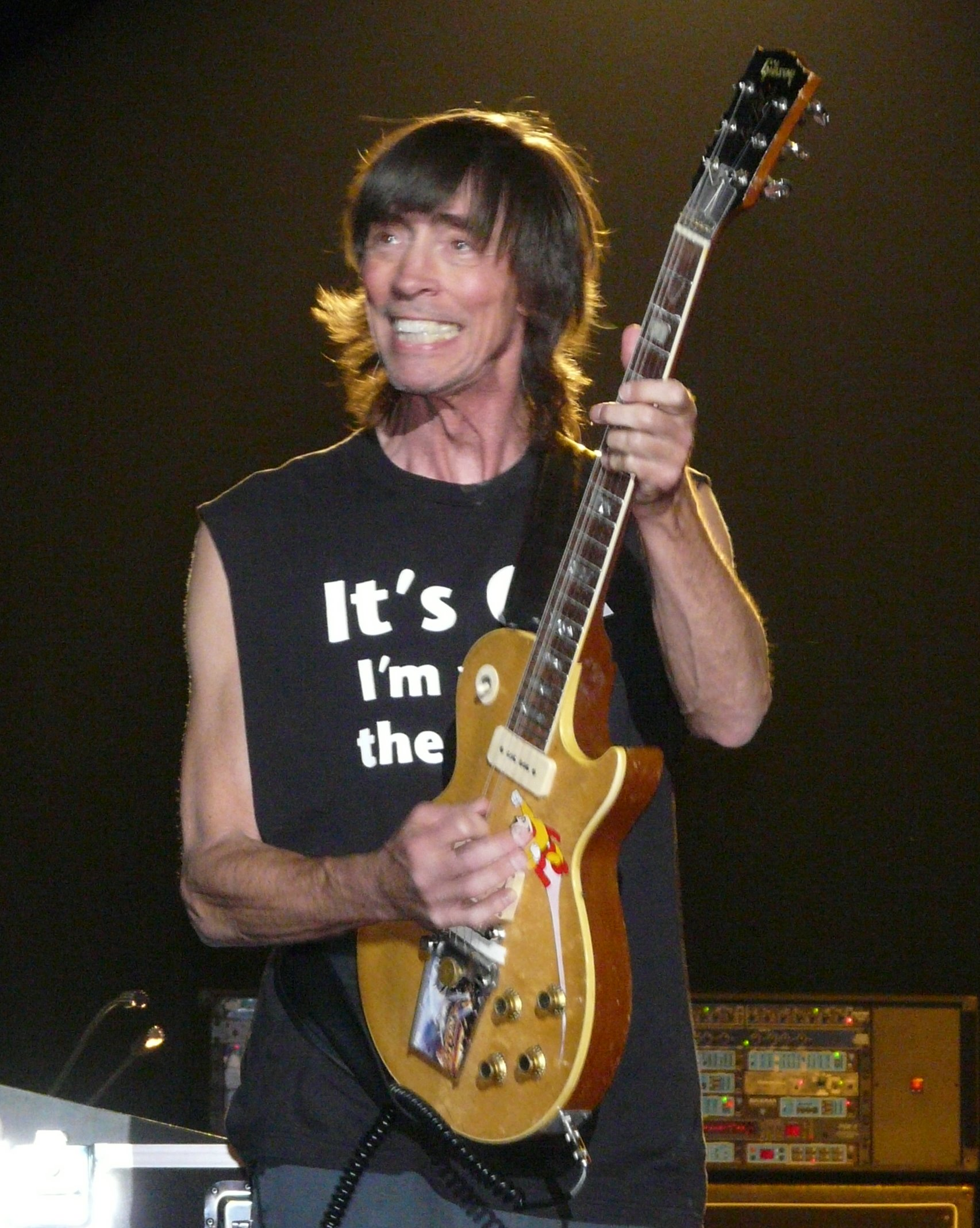
Tom Scholz, the band's founder, lead guitarist, and primary songwriter

Scholz headed back to the studio in 1998 to begin work on a fifth album, which eventually turned out to be Corporate America. The title track of "Corporate America" was uploaded by Tom Scholz to MP3.com under the pseudonym of "Downer's Revenge" in early 2002 to test the album's appeal to a younger demographic. The song reached number two on the progressive rock charts on the website for two weeks.

November 2002 marked the release of Corporate America on the independent label Artemis Records. This album featured the largest Boston lineup ever; returning members included Delp and Cosmo on rhythm guitar and lead vocals, Scholz on lead guitar and keyboards, and Gary Pihl on guitar, along with new members Anthony Cosmo on rhythm guitar, Jeff Neal on drums, and Kimberley Dahme on bass, acoustic guitar, and vocals. Dahme, Delp, and Cosmo all contributed lead vocals to the album. Due to lack of promotion on Artemis Records' part, Tom Scholz sued Artemis. Artemis settled and subsequently went out of business, but with that took that album with them. The album has been out of print for 20 years. The group embarked on a national tour in support of the album in 2003 and 2004. In 2006, the first two Boston albums appeared in remastered form.

=== Death of Brad Delp (2007) ===
On March 9, 2007, lead singer Delp died by suicide at his home in Atkinson, New Hampshire. Police found him dead in his master bathroom, along with several notes for whoever would find him. In the bathroom where he died, two charcoal grills were found on the bathroom fixtures, and the door was sealed with duct tape and a towel underneath. Police called the death "untimely" and said no foul play was indicated. Delp was alone at the time of his death, according to the police report. He was found by his fiancée, who saw a dryer hose attached to his car. According to the New Hampshire medical examiner, his death was the result of suicide by carbon monoxide poisoning. Delp's last concert with Boston was performed at Boston Symphony Hall on November 13, 2006, at a concert honoring Doug Flutie.

A concert in honor of Delp named Come Together: A Tribute to Brad Delp occurred on August 19, 2007, at the Bank of America Pavilion in Boston. The concert included Ernie and the Automatics, Beatlejuice, Farrenheit, Extreme, Godsmack, RTZ, Orion the Hunter, and finally the current version of Boston.

All of the living members of Boston were invited to perform in the concert. The singers for Boston included Michael Sweet of Stryper, former band member Curly Smith, band member Kimberley Dahme, and a Boston fan from North Carolina named Tommy DeCarlo, who was chosen to sing based on his performances of Boston cover songs on his MySpace page.

=== New line-up and intermittent performances (2008–2012) ===
The ongoing conflicts among the surviving band members spilled over to the 2008 Presidential campaign. Barry Goudreau appeared with Mike Huckabee and played with him at some rallies in New Hampshire. Huckabee used "More Than a Feeling" as a campaign theme song. Scholz, a self-described "Obama supporter", sent an open letter to Huckabee in February 2008 stating that the band had never endorsed any candidate, and that he had never authorized the use of "More Than a Feeling" as Huckabee's theme song. Scholz made a point of saying that he, and not Goudreau or Sheehan, actually played all the guitars on "More Than a Feeling", as well as most of Boston's songs. Huckabee eventually stopped using the song for his campaign.

In the spring of 2008, Scholz and Sweet introduced a new Boston lineup, which subsequently did a North American summer tour, playing 53 dates in 12 weeks (on a double bill with Styx). Scholz was the only founding member of Boston to play on the tour, although longtime member Gary Pihl was also part of the band, and Dahme and Neal returned on bass and drums, respectively. DeCarlo and Sweet shared lead vocals.

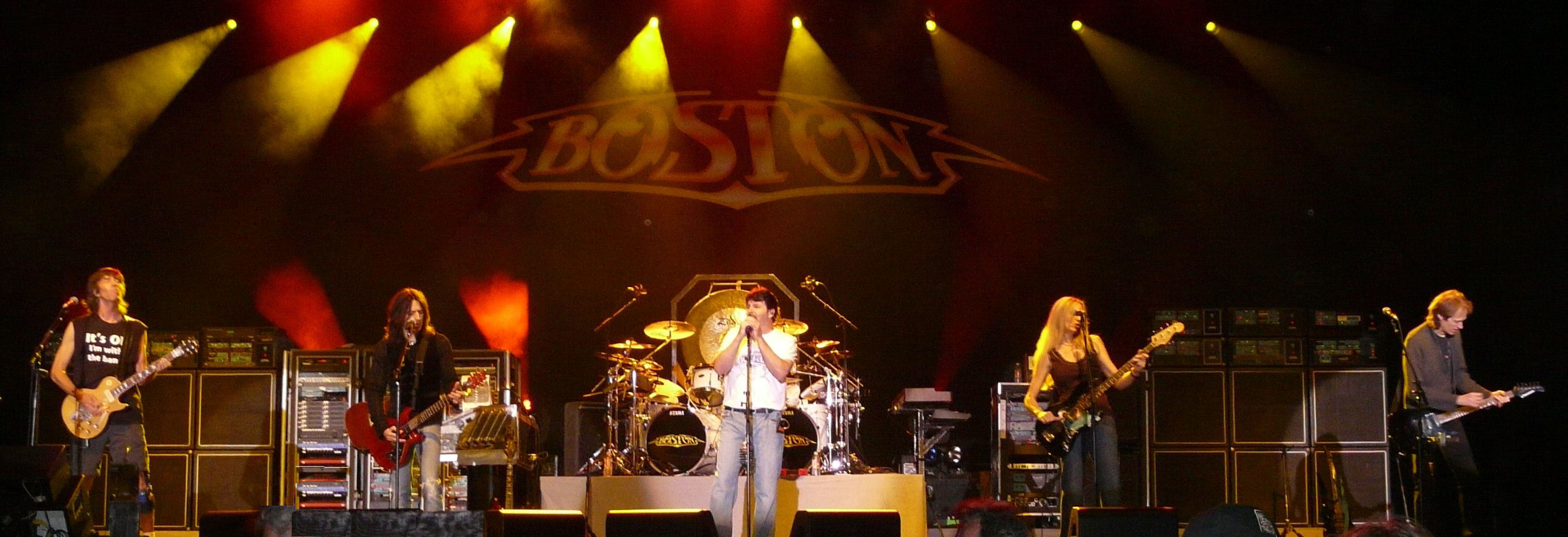
Boston in 2008: Left to right: Scholz, Sweet, DeCarlo, Dahme, and Pihl

In January 2009, Greatest Hits was re-released as a remastered disc, with the addition of "I Had A Good Time" from Corporate America.

Michael Sweet left the band in August 2011, to focus on Stryper. In 2012, guitarist and vocalist David Victor joined the band, beginning in the studio, where he contributed vocals to several tracks on the album in progress.

Scholz and Pihl led the band on a 2012 North American tour, beginning on June 28, 2012, at the Seminole Hard Rock Live arena in Hollywood, Florida, and ending on September 8 at the U.S. Cellular Grandstand in Hutchinson, Kansas. Victor and DeCarlo shared lead vocals, with drummer Curly Smith returning for the first time in over a decade, and former Stryper member Tracy Ferrie on bass. Neither Dahme nor Neal played on the tour.

=== Life, Love & Hope (2013–2017) ===
Boston's sixth album, Life, Love & Hope, was released on December 3, 2013, by Frontiers Records; it includes lead vocals from Brad Delp, Tommy DeCarlo, Kimberley Dahme, David Victor, and Tom Scholz. Work on the album started in 2002. On December 11, 2013, Boston re-recorded a Christmas song, "God Rest Ye Metal Gentlemen 2013" (previously released in 2002 as "God Rest Ye Merry Gentlemen"). In 2014, Boston embarked on the Heaven on Earth Tour spanning the United States and Japan with a lineup including Scholz, Pihl, DeCarlo, Victor, and Ferrie. Dahme returned, this time performing rhythm guitar and vocals, and drumming duties were split between Neal and Smith, with Neal handling the first leg of the tour. Victor departed the lineup partway through the tour due to creative differences. In his stead, Siobhan Magnus joined the tour as a guest vocalist in July, performing lead vocals on "Walk On".

In 2015, Boston launched another tour with a lineup consisting of Scholz, Pihl, DeCarlo, Ferrie, and new member Beth Cohen, who performed keyboards, rhythm guitar, and vocals. Cohen had previously recorded with the group on both Corporate America and Life, Love and Hope as a vocalist and flautist. Initially, the lineup was to include former Spock's Beard drummer and vocalist Nick D'Virgilio for its first month of shows, with Neal then returning, but D'Virgilio proved "not the right fit" and Smith rejoined in his place. This seven-person lineup proved Boston's most stable lineup in some time, touring, as well, in the summers of 2016 and 2017. The 2016 tour marked the group's 40th anniversary and included shows in Boston's Wang Theatre, their first full performances in their namesake town since 1994.

On March 22, 2017, former drummer Sib Hashian died after collapsing on a Legends of Rock cruise ship.

=== Upcoming seventh studio album and death of DeCarlo (2017–present) ===
By 2017, Scholz had begun writing new material for the seventh Boston album. He told the Sun Herald in April of that year, "I find that I'm in a position that I really need to write things that we can play at the shows. We play basically everything that people expect to hear that we can fit into two hours. We also do a lot of things that aren't on any of the records by adding things and segues and instrumental parts, so I always have to come up with new stuff. It's quite a challenge. I have to write new things for the tour every year, which is what I wanted to do in the first place. But I got sidetracked in the studio, recording. Now, I'm actually a performing musician, and I have to tell you, it's much more fun." When asked the same month about a potential release date of the album, Scholz said, "Who knows? I'm only 70. I figure I've got 30 years."

In an August 2024 interview with MIT Technology Review, Scholz revealed that his analog studio equipment is in need of repair and, "Unfortunately, there's almost no one left locally that can repair or maintain analog equipment." Scholz also stated, "I'm still writing music, believe it or not, with what's left of my brain. It's very frustrating not to be able to go in and record what I hear."

In a July 2025 interview with Metal Mayhem ROC, guitarist Gary Pihl confirmed that, "Tom's always working on songs. Just as in the past, he'll call me in or one of the other guys to play their parts. Then he'll go back into the studio and fix things, change things around." When asked about the possibility of a new Boston album or a tour in 2026 to coincide the 50th anniversary of the band's first album, Pihl said, "I'm hoping there will be another album and tour. Of course, next year will be the 50th anniversary of the first album, so I'm hoping that there will be a tour for that. But we'll just have to wait and see."

DeCarlo died from brain cancer on March 9, 2026, at the age of 60. Coincidentally, his death occurred exactly 19 years after Delp's death in 2007.

== Spaceship theme ==
A prominent theme on Boston's album covers is the presence of a guitar-shaped spaceship, ostensibly a generation or colony ship carrying the city of Boston inside a clear dome, with the city's name emblazoned across the front. The original spaceship was designed in 1976 by Paula Scher and illustrated by Roger Huyssen with lettering by Gerard Huerta for Epic Records.

=== Appearances ===
- Boston (1976) – Two long lines of guitar-shaped starships flee a planet that is breaking apart. The ships all have blue flames coming out of the bottom.
- Don't Look Back (1978) – The Boston ship is flying low or perhaps hovering over a grassy, crystalline planet. The ship has searchlights on.
- Third Stage (1986) – The Boston ship is headed toward a large, flat mothership resembling a bank of organ pipes over a blue planet.
- Walk On (1994) – The Boston ship is shown crashing through a rock outcropping.
- Greatest Hits (1997, compilation album) – The Boston ship is flying low over a planet with turquoise rocks and a turquoise tower in the distance.
- Corporate America (2002) – The Boston ship is flying toward Earth and the United States.
- Life, Love & Hope (2013) – The Boston ship is flying in space, near a nebula.

Their spaceship also appeared on their tours in the late 1980s, early 1990s, and early 2000s, in the form of a giant lighting rig, and accompanied on stage by their giant pipe-organ set piece, which is known to Boston insiders as Bertha because of its sheer size. Also, the Boston logo could represent a front view of the spaceship, with the top being shaped similarly to the city dome and the left and right "fins" corresponding to the edges of the ship.

== Innovation and style ==
Boston's genre is mostly described as hard rock and arena rock. The band has also incorporated elements of progressive rock into its music.

Boston founder, guitarist, and primary songwriter Tom Scholz's blend of musical styles, ranging from classical to 1960s English pop, has resulted in a sound characterized by multiple lead and blended harmonies guitar work (usually harmonized in thirds), often alternating between and then mixing electric and acoustic guitars. The band's harmonic style has been characterized as being "violin-like" without using synthesizers. Scholz developed complex, multi-tracked guitar harmonies, using handmade, high-tech equipment, such as the Rockman, used by artists such as Journey guitarist Neal Schon and the band ZZ Top. Def Leppard's album Hysteria was created using only Rockman technology.

Tom Scholz also credited Brad Delp with helping to create Boston's sound with his vocal style. Delp, who was influenced by the Beatles, had an extended vocal range, shown on hits such as "More Than a Feeling".

== Band members ==
=== Current ===
- Tom Scholz – guitar, bass, keyboards, drums, percussion, backing vocals (1975–present)
- Gary Pihl – guitar, keyboards, backing vocals (1985–present)
- Curly Smith – drums, harmonica, piano, backing vocals (1994–1997, 2012–present)
- Jeff Neal – drums, percussion, backing vocals (2002–2008, 2014–present)
- Tracy Ferrie – bass, backing vocals (2012–present)
- Beth Cohen – keyboards, vocals, guitar (2015–present)

== Discography ==
=== Studio albums ===
- Boston (1976)
- Don't Look Back (1978)
- Third Stage (1986)
- Walk On (1994)
- Corporate America (2002)
- Life, Love & Hope (2013)
