= Jim Masdea =

American drummer

- Born: Boston, Massachusetts, US
- Genre: Rock
- Occupation: Musician
- Instruments: Drums; percussion; keyboards; guitar; vocals
- Years active: 1970s–present
- Formerly of: Boston

James Masdea is an American drummer, who was the original drummer for Boston briefly in 1975, and then again from 1983 to 1988.

== Early life ==
Masdea was born and raised in Jamaica Plain, a neighbourhood in Boston, Massachusetts. His mother never passed tenth grade and his father died when Masdea was young.

== Boston ==
=== 1970s ===
Masdea attended Massachusetts Institute of Technology (MIT), and in 1969, met fellow students Tom Scholz and Barry Goudreau, both guitarists. In 1973, Masdea, Scholz, Goudreau, and vocalist Brad Delp formed the band Mother's Milk. By 1974, that group had disbanded but Masdea and Delp were helping Scholz produce an album he was making in his basement. Choosing the band name Boston, they released the album under the same name by 1976, although Masdea had already left, and as a result, only one song on the album, "Rock & Roll Band", actually features his drumming, with the rest having been performed by Sib Hashian.

=== 1980s ===
By the early 1980s, Masdea had spent a few months operating a boat in Jamaica, and was now working at a Pro Audio place. In 1980, disputes between Scholz and the bands led to delays in band activity, resulting in Scholz letting go on the rest of the band so they could work on their own projects. Goudreau left and Masdea got in touch with him and offered Goudreau his own studio to record his solo album, which was built by Masdea with Les Arnold, brother of Bruce Arnold of the band Orpheus. Masdea also played drums on the album and Delp provided vocals.

In 1983, Masdea returned to Boston after Scholz invited him and Delp back into the band. He would play on their third studio album, Third Stage, which was released in 1986. According to Masdea, he played on the majority of the tracks, "the first side, half of it or a little bit more, is all Sib (Hashian). Then 'The Launch,' 'My Destination' – I played with Tom. And then the second side, that's pretty much all me." Masdea also joined them on their tour the following year, marking the first time he ever played live with Boston, during which he would also contribute keyboards on stage. He had been replaced by 1988.

=== Lawsuit and criticizm of Scholz ===
In 1990, Masdea sued Scholz for unpaid profits from previous albums and the 1987 tour. The two parties settled out of court.

In recent years, Masdea has criticised Scholz, labeling him a "narcissist". He claims that his ambition to write more songs than just play drums is what led to him being fired by Scholz in 1975, and claims that he wrote a lot of material on the debut album which he wasn't credited for. In a 2026 interview, Masdea called Scholz "the Donald Trump of rock ’n’ roll", and followed up with "he’s not horrible, but he’s a narcissist. He believes it’s only him, that everything was only him."

In a separate interview, Masdea claimed that the only reason he and Brad Delp were invited back into Boston was because Scholz did not want them working on Goudreau's album: "So we started working and we spent a few weeks working on it (Barry Goudreau's album). Tom caught wind of it, and when he caught wind of it, he realized, even though he's a narcissist and believes that I had no effect on the music, his subconscious knew different because he didn't want me working with Barry. Because Brad was singing it - Brad had agreed to do the vocals, Barry and me we were going to be the band, and Tom found out, and called me up, asked me to come back because he felt that Brad and I were the creative force. He was lying, he just didn't want me working with Barry."

== Later career ==
Since leaving Boston in 1988, Masdea has worked in several business projects, including building and operating his own bakery, and as a sailor on a commercial Yacht. As of 2018, Masdea was touring with a show called "Trimount: Before Boston", which mixed both Boston songs and Masdea's own compositions. He also sings and plays guitar in the show.
