= Boston (album) =

1976 studio album by Boston

Studio album by Boston
- Released: August 25, 1976
- Recorded: October 1975 – April 1976
- Studios: Foxglove (Watertown); Capitol (Hollywood); Record Plant (Los Angeles)
- Genres: Hard rock; arena rock
- Length: 37:37
- Label: Epic
- Producers: John Boylan; Tom Scholz

Boston chronology
Boston (1976)	Don't Look Back (1978)

Singles from Boston
- 1. "More Than a Feeling" Released: August 1976; 2. "Long Time" Released: January 1977; 3. "Peace of Mind" Released: April 1977

Boston is the debut studio album by American rock band Boston, released on August 25, 1976, by Epic Records. It was produced by band guitarist Tom Scholz and John Boylan. A multi-instrumentalist and engineer who had been involved in the Boston music scene since the late 1960s, Scholz started to write and record demos in his apartment basement with singer Brad Delp, but received numerous rejections from major record labels. The demo tape fell into the hands of CBS-owned Epic, which signed the band in 1975. The album is characterized for its unique blend of electronic effects, the Hammond organ, heavy guitar riffs, and early rock and roll to create what Scholz referred to as the "Boston sound".

Defying Epic Records's insistence on recording the album professionally in Los Angeles, Scholz and Boylan deceived label executives into believing the band was recording on the West Coast, when in reality, the bulk was being tracked solely by Scholz in his Massachusetts home. The album's contents are a complete recreation of the band's demo tape, and contain songs written and composed many years prior. The album's style was developed through Scholz's love for classical music, melodic hooks and early guitar-heavy rock groups such as the Kinks and the Yardbirds, as well as a number of analogue electronic effects developed by Scholz in his home studio. Besides Scholz, who played most of the instruments on nearly all of the tracks, and Delp, other musicians appear on the album, such as drummers Jim Masdea and Sib Hashian, guitarist Barry Goudreau and bassist Fran Sheehan. All except Masdea became full-time band members.

The album was released by Epic in August 1976 and broke sales records, becoming the best-selling debut LP in the US at the time, and winning the Recording Industry Association of America (RIAA) Century Award for the best-selling debut album. The album's singles, "More Than a Feeling", "Peace of Mind" and "Foreplay/Long Time", were major hits, and nearly the entire album receives constant airplay on classic rock radio. The album is often regarded as a staple of 1970s rock and has been included on many lists of essential albums. It has sold at least 17 million copies in the United States alone and at least 20 million worldwide, making it one of the best-selling debut albums of all time.

== Background ==
In the late 1960s, Tom Scholz began attending the Massachusetts Institute of Technology (MIT), where he first wrote music. After graduating with a master's degree, he began working for the Polaroid Corporation in the product development division. By night, he played keyboards for bands in the Boston bar and club scene, where he collaborated with drummer Jim Masdea. The two – who shared a concept of the perfect rock band, one "with crystal-clear vocals and bone-crunching guitars" – viewed themselves as only part-time musicians. Despite this, the duo built a small studio near Watertown, Massachusetts to record ideas. Scholz recorded for hours, often re-recording, erasing, and discarding tapes to create "a perfect song."

Both musicians later joined Mother's Milk, a band featuring guitarist Barry Goudreau that vied for recognition in the Boston music scene. Scholz quickly went from keyboardist to lead songwriter, and the band went through dozens of lead vocalists before Brad Delp auditioned. Delp, a former factory worker at a Danvers electric coil company, spent much of his weekends performing in various cover bands. Upon hearing that Mother's Milk needed a vocalist, Delp drove to Revere Beach, where the three-piece was performing at a club named Jojo's.

Delp was impressed that the band had already recorded a demo tape, and he earned his position in Mother's Milk after auditioning with the Joe Walsh song "Rocky Mountain Way". Mother's Milk thus became an early version of Boston, with Goudreau on lead guitar.

By 1973, the band had a six-song demo tape ready for mailing, and Scholz and his wife Cindy sent copies to every record company they could find. The songs on the demo were "More Than a Feeling", "Peace of Mind", "Rock & Roll Band", "Something About You", "San Francisco Day" (later changed and renamed "Hitch a Ride") and "Love" (later changed to "Don't Be Afraid"). The group received rejection slips from several labels - RCA, Capitol, Atlantic and Elektra among the most notable - and Epic Records rejected the tape flatly with a "very insulting letter" signed by company head Lennie Petze that opined the band "offered nothing new". The tape that received the most attention contained embryonic renditions of future songs that would appear on Boston's debut album. Delp departed shortly after that because "there just wasn't any money coming in."

By 1975, Scholz was finished with the club scene, concentrating exclusively on the demo tapes he recorded at home in his basement. Having to both pay rent on the house and maintain his recording equipment ate up his finances; at one point, he spent the money he had saved for a down payment on a future home to buy a used professional 12-track tape recorder made by Scully Recording Instruments.

He called Delp to provide vocals, remarking, "If you can't really afford to join the band or if you don't want to join the band, maybe you'd just want to come down to the studio and sing on some of these tapes for me."

Scholz gave a copy of the Mother's Milk demo to a Polaroid co-worker whose cousin worked at ABC Records (who had signed one of Scholz's favorite bands, the James Gang). The employee forgot to mail the tape out, and it sat on his desk for months until Columbia began contacting Scholz about auditioning for the label, after which he sent the tape to ABC.

Charles McKenzie, a New England representative for ABC Records, first overheard the tape in a co-worker's office. He called Paul Ahern, an independent record promoter in California, with whom he held a gentleman's agreement that if either heard anything interesting, they would inform the other. Ahern connected with Petze at Epic and informed him, even though Petze had passed on the original Mother's Milk demos.

Epic contacted Scholz and offered a contract that first required the group to perform in a showcase for CBS representatives, as the label suspected that the "band" was, in reality, a "mad genius at work in a basement."

Masdea had started to lose interest in the project by this time. To complete the lineup, Scholz recruited Goudreau and two other musicians who had recorded on the early demos, bass player Fran Sheehan and drummer Dave Currier. In November 1975, the group performed for the executives in a Boston warehouse that had previously been used by Aerosmith as a practice facility.

One month later, CBS Records signed Mother's Milk in a contract that required 10 albums over 6 years. Currier quit before he knew the band passed the audition, and Scholz recruited drummer Sib Hashian in his place.

Epic had signed an agreement with NABET, the union representing electrical and broadcast engineers, which specified that any recording done outside of a Columbia-owned studio but within a 250-mile radius of one of those studios required a paid union engineer to be present.

As such, the label wanted the band to travel to Los Angeles and re-record their songs with a different producer. Scholz was unhappy with being unable to be in charge, and John Boylan, a friend of a friend of Ahern, came on board the project.

Boylan's duty was to "run interference for the label and keep them happy", and he made a crucial suggestion: that the band change their name to "Boston".

== Recording and production ==
"We didn't actually tell them that we were transferring the tapes. What they didn't know wouldn't hurt them. We told them we were working on the album with Boylan, that was all true – Tom still had stuff to do back home. A lot of bands were signed and get put in with a producer, and then all of a sudden it's the producer's project. Before you know it, it doesn't resemble anything of what you were doing. We were very fortunate that that didn't happen to us. Boylan had the ears to know that Tom knew his way around a studio. We gave them a complete tape, and they thought, 'Man, these guys work fast.'"

— Brad Delp

Boston was recorded primarily at Scholz's Foxglove Studios in Watertown in "an elaborate end run around the CBS brain trust." Epic wanted a studio version that sounded identical to the demo tape, and Scholz decided he could not work in a production studio, having adapted to home recording for several years, stating, "I work[ed] alone, and that was it."

Scholz took a leave of absence from Polaroid and was gone for several months to record the band's album. "I would wake up every day and go downstairs and start playing," he recalled. Scholz grew annoyed reproducing the parts and being forced to use the same equipment on the demo.

The basement, located in a lower-middle-class neighborhood on School Street, was described by Scholz as a "tiny little space next to the furnace in this hideous pine-paneled basement of my apartment house, and it flooded from time to time with God knows what."

There was a Hammond organ and a Leslie speaker stuffed in the corner of the room alongside the drums; whenever it was time to record the organ parts, they would tear the drums down and pull out the Leslie.

Boylan felt that while Scholz's guitars "sounded amazing," Scholz did not understand how to record acoustic instruments correctly and flew in engineer Paul Grupp to instruct him on microphone technique.

Boylan's hands-on involvement would center on recording the vocals and mixing, and he took the rest of the band out to the West Coast, where they recorded "Let Me Take You Home Tonight". "It was a decoy," recalled Scholz, who recorded the bulk back home in Watertown without CBS's knowledge. While Boylan arranged for Delp to have a custom-made Taylor acoustic guitar for thousands of dollars charged to the album budget, Scholz recorded such tracks as "More Than a Feeling" in his basement with a $100 Yamaha acoustic guitar.

That spring, Boylan returned to Watertown to hear the tracks on which Scholz had recut drums and other percussion and keyboard parts. He then hired a remote truck from Providence, Rhode Island to come to Watertown, where it ran a snake through the basement window of Scholz's home to transfer his tracks to a 3M-79 2-inch 24-track deck. The entire recording was completed in the basement, save for Delp's vocals, which were recorded at Capitol Studios' Studio C with Warren Dewey engineering the overdubs. Some of the equipment used in the recording of the album was designed by Scholz himself.

All vocals were double-tracked except the lead vocal, and all the parts were done by Delp in quick succession. When Scholz arrived in Los Angeles for mixing, he felt intimidated. He feared the professional engineers would view him as "this hick who worked in a basement." Instead, Scholz felt they were backward in their approach and lacked the knowledge he had obtained. "These people were so swept up in how cool they were and how important it was to have all this high-priced crap that they couldn't see the forest for the trees," he said.

Boylan encountered his only real confrontation with the autocratic Scholz during the mixing stage, in which Scholz handled the guitar tracks, Boylan the drums, and Dewey the vocals, with Steve Hodge assisting. Scholz pushed guitars too high in the mix, rendering vocals inaudible at times.

The operation has been described as "one of the most complex corporate capers in the history of the music business." Except for "Let Me Take You Home Tonight," the album was a virtual copy of the demo tapes. The album was recorded for a few thousand dollars, a paltry amount in an industry accustomed to spending hundreds of thousands on a single recording.

== Music ==
"Foreplay/Long Time"
This sample of "Foreplay/Long Time" demonstrates the band's shifting emphasis between acoustic and electric guitars.

The styles of Boston have been categorized as hard rock and arena rock (though the latter had yet to have been coined at the time of the album's release). The tracks are described as "anthemic" and make use of layered melodies and vocal harmonies.

Boston is composed mainly of songs written many years before their appearance on the album. Scholz wrote or co-wrote every song on the first album (except for "Let Me Take You Home Tonight," written by Delp), played virtually all of the instruments, and recorded and engineered all the tracks. The "Boston sound" combines "big, giant melodic hooks" with "massively heavy, classically-inspired guitar parts." For Scholz, the idea of beautiful vocal harmonies was inspired by The Left Banke. The guitar-driven aspect was influenced by the Kinks, the Yardbirds, and Blue Cheer. Another signature element of the "Boston sound" in terms of production involves the balance between acoustic and electric guitars. To this end, Scholz was inspired by his childhood listening to classical music, noting that the "basic concept" of setting the listener up for a change that is coming in the music had been explored for hundreds of years in classical compositions. The record also makes use of multiple-part harmonized guitar solos and baroque melodic devices known as mordents.

"More Than a Feeling" is an ode to daydreaming and contains a guitar solo reminiscent of "Telstar." The track was inspired by Scholz's love affair years prior while in school. "Walk Away Renée" by The Left Banke was popular at the time, and it caused Scholz to pine miserably over the girl. "More Than a Feeling" unintentionally incorporates a chord progression from that particular song following the line "I see my Mary Ann walking away." Scholz initially felt it was his best shot at a lead single but became depressed when doubts got the best of him. Ahern loved the track and was sure it would receive maximum airplay. "Peace of Mind" was penned about Scholz's Polaroid superiors and recorded around the fall of 1974. "Foreplay," the extensive introduction to "Long Time," was composed many years prior in 1972. "Rock & Roll Band," a track that dates back to the band's Mother's Milk demo, was inspired by Masdea's experiences performing in various bar combos and was written just as "pure fantasy." The album version still features Masdea's drums from the demo tape. "Smokin' " was written and recorded in 1973 and called "Shakin'." "Hitch a Ride" was originally titled "San Francisco Day," with lyrics starting in New York City and then planning to hitch a ride to "head for the other side." This was the first song Delp re-recorded after the original Mother's Milk vocalist left. To create the special effect of a bent note on the track's organ solo, Scholz slowed down one of the recording reels with his finger. "Something About You" was originally "Life Isn't Easy" and was written around 1975. As the last demo, it was the penultimate track.

The trademark sci-fi theme of the record cover was Scholz's concept: "The idea was escape; I thought of a 'spaceship guitar.' " The original spaceship was designed in 1976 by Paula Scher and illustrated by Roger Huyssen with lettering by Gerard Huerta for Epic Records.

== Release ==
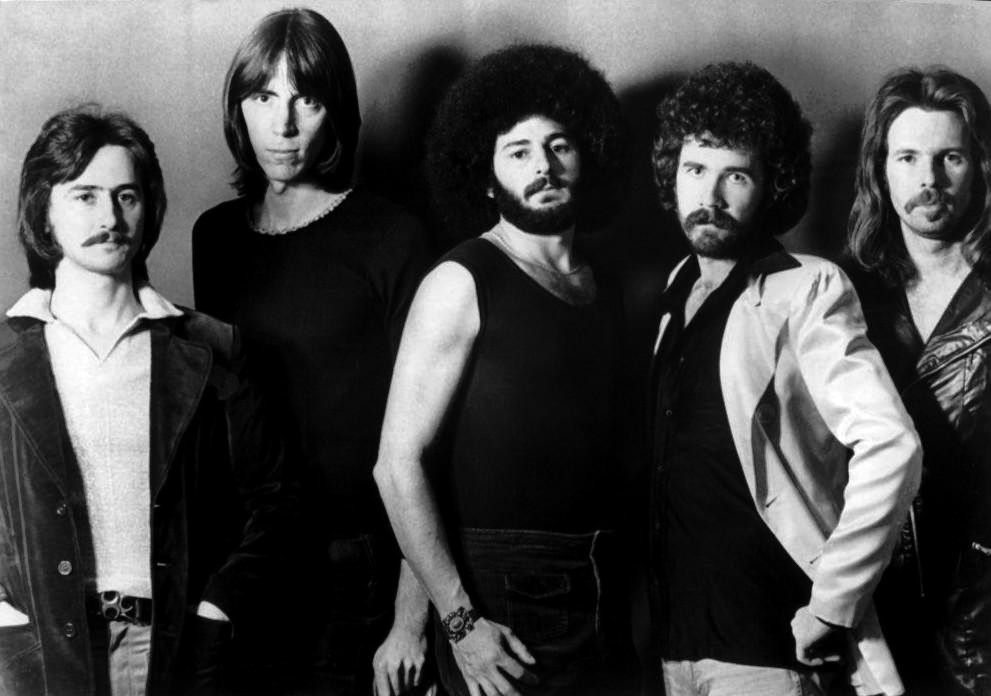
From left: Barry Goudreau, Tom Scholz, Sib Hashian, Brad Delp, Fran Sheehan, in 1976.

Boston was released by Epic Records on, according to varying sources, either August 23 or August 25, 1976. The album broke out of Cleveland first, and the following week, it had been added at 392 stations. Had the record failed, Scholz, then 29, planned to abandon his ambition of making a living performing music; he still worked at Polaroid after it was released and doubted its commercial success until it sold 200,000 copies. "And all of a sudden I realized I was in the music business," he told Rolling Stone. "I got word on what the sales figures were while I was still at Polaroid full-time. It wasn't easy staying there two more weeks." Critics were kind to Boston; Rolling Stone wrote that "The group's affinity for heavy rock & roll provides a sense of dynamics that coheres magnetically with sophisticated progressive structures."

The album was certified gold in October 1976 and sold another 500,000 copies within 30 days, going platinum for the first time in November 1976.

By January 1977, the debut disc sold 2,000,000 copies, making it one of the fastest-selling debut albums in rock history. "More Than a Feeling" became a hit single on both AM Top 40 stations (with its second verse deleted for time constraints) and on FM "AOR" stations (with the second verse left intact).

"I was at Polaroid when I first heard 'More Than A Feeling' on the radio," said Scholz. "I was listening to somebody else's radio. The first week the album came out, it did better than I expected." Epic Records was pleased with their new acquisition—Boston and another new band, Wild Cherry, were among Epic's biggest success stories of 1976.

The album was afforded several accolades, including a Grammy Award nomination for Best New Artist; they lost to the Starland Vocal Band, a one hit wonder group, whose surprise hit "Afternoon Delight" with its sexually suggestive lyrics and chorus "Skyrockets in flight" resonated during the Bicentennial summer of 1976. Boston sold 6,000,000 albums, including records, 8-tracks and cassettes by December 1977. For massive popularity, Boston was considered to rival established stars such as Peter Frampton, Fleetwood Mac and Stevie Wonder.

By 1986, the album had been certified for over 9,000,000 sales domestically, and Boston went diamond in 1990. By November 2003, the album was certified by the Recording Industry Association of America (RIAA) for sales of 17,000,000. Worldwide, the album has sold 20,000,000 copies.

The album is the second best-selling debut album of all time in the United States, after Guns N' Roses' Appetite for Destruction. It is the joint eighth best-selling album in US history. Boston, along with the band's 1978 follow-up Don't Look Back, was remastered in 2006 by Scholz.

== Reception ==
Professional ratings
Review scores
Source	Rating
AllMusic	4.5/5 stars
Christgau's Record Guide	C
The Encyclopedia of Popular Music	4/5 stars
PopMatters	8/10 stars
The Rolling Stone Record Guide	3/5 stars

The album soared, with three singles becoming Top 40 hits. All eight songs on the album received regular airplay on classic rock radio decades later. Taking a mere three weeks to earn an RIAA Gold Record Award (500,000 in unit sales) in 1976 and a Platinum Award (1,000,000 in unit sales) after three months on November 11, 1976, it was the fastest-selling debut album for any American group. It has continued to sell very well, accumulating 9,000,000 in sales by the 10th anniversary in 1986, reaching Diamond in 1990, and 17× platinum by 2003.

== Touring ==
The first tour in support of the album was a short six-week promotional club tour throughout the Midwest. Boston soon found themselves on a nationwide tour that lasted 10 months. "We started playing the Agoras in Cleveland and Columbus," said Delp. "500–1000 seat clubs. The response was great, I was amazed that people were singing along with all the songs. It really impressed upon me the power of radio, the fact that wherever we went, they were just playing the record and people just came, and it was great." However, several bands the group opened for were less than enthusiastic to meet them. At one point, they were opening for Foghat but lost the gig when a Milwaukee disc jockey introduced Boston, not headliner Foghat, as the best rock and roll band in the world. While the band were apprehensive about opening for Black Sabbath, the experience was pleasant. "The great thing about Black Sabbath was that they didn't do soundchecks," remembered Delp. "So we were afforded all the time we wanted on stage, Ozzy Osbourne would say, 'Ahh, you wanna go up and play some songs, go ahead.' They couldn't have been nicer."

Boston eventually began headlining shows in 1977 and sold out four Southern California concert halls within one week. Bob Seger and the Silver Bullet Band opened for Boston in Detroit. On their swing back to the Northeast, they sold out two nights in the Philadelphia Spectrum—and in their New York City debut, three sold-out shows at Madison Square Garden. "I sold out arenas with this group in four cities from Lincoln, Nebraska to Louisville, Kentucky," said concert promoter Bob Bagaris to Billboard. "I've never seen such universal penetration of key secondary markets by any major group. Even the biggest acts usually don't do so well in every market."

== Legacy ==
Boston has been described as a pivot in the transition of mainstream American rock from blues-based proto-metal to power pop, "combining some of the ebullience of the rock era's early days with the precision and technology that would mark rock record productions from then on." All eight songs—most commonly the album's A-side—are in constant rotation on classic rock radio. Boston's success ushered in the next wave of "producer" rock sound. Following the album's success, its sound became imitated by several other prominent rock bands of the era. The record created a reference point for production values and studio technology that would stand for years. The album is hailed as one of the greatest in rock history, with an inclusion in the book 1001 Albums You Must Hear Before You Die. The album was also ranked No. 43 on the Rock and Roll Hall of Fame's "Definitive 200" list. Vik Iyengar of AllMusic said the album is "essential for any fan of classic rock."

== Track listing ==
All tracks are written by Tom Scholz, except "Smokin'", co-written with Brad Delp, and "Let Me Take You Home Tonight", written solely by Delp.

LP - Side One
No.	Title	Length
1.	"More Than a Feeling"	4:45
2.	"Peace of Mind"	5:02
3.	"Foreplay/Long Time"	7:47
Total length:		17:34

LP - Side two
No.	Title	Length
4.	"Rock & Roll Band"	2:59
5.	"Smokin'"	4:19
6.	"Hitch a Ride"	4:11
7.	"Something About You"	3:48
8.	"Let Me Take You Home Tonight"	4:44
Total length:		20:03

Cassette Reissue - 1986

No.	Title	Length
1.	"More Than a Feeling"	4:45
2.	"Peace of Mind"	5:02
3.	"Rock & Roll Band"	2:59
4.	"Smokin’"	4:19
Total length:		17:07

No.	Title	Length
1.	"Something About You"	3:48
2.	"Let Me Take You Home Tonight"	4:44
3.	"Hitch a Ride"	4:11
4.	"Foreplay/Long Time"	7:47
Total length:		20:30

== Personnel ==
Ref:

=== Boston ===
- Brad Delp – vocals, 12-string acoustic guitar, rhythm guitar, percussion
- Tom Scholz – lead and rhythm guitar, acoustic guitar, special effects guitar, bass, organ, clavinet, percussion, producer, engineer
- Sib Hashian – drums, percussion
- Barry Goudreau – lead and rhythm guitar, guitar solos on "Long Time" and "Let Me Take You Home Tonight"
- Fran Sheehan – bass on "Foreplay" and "Let Me Take You Home Tonight"

=== Additional musician and technical personnel ===
- Jim Masdea – drums on "Rock & Roll Band"
- John Boylan – producer
- Warren Dewey – engineer
- Deni King, Bruce Hensel, Doug Ryder – assistant engineer
- Steve Hodge – assistant in mixing
- Wally Traugott – LP mastering
- Toby Mountain, Bill Ryan – remastering
- Tom "Curly" Ruff – digital transfer

=== Additional personnel ===
- Paul Ahern, Charles McKenzie – art direction
- Kim Hart – design consulting
- Jeff Albertson, Ron Pownall – photography
- Paula Scher – cover designer
- Roger Huyssen – cover illustration
- Gerard Huerta - hand lettering
- Joel Zimmerman – reissue design

== Charts ==
=== Weekly charts ===
Chart (1976–77)	Peak position
Australian Albums (Kent Music Report)	16
Canada Top Albums/CDs (RPM)	7
Dutch Albums (Album Top 100)	11
Finnish Albums (The Official Finnish Charts)	20
German Albums (Offizielle Top 100)	4
Japanese Albums (Oricon)	24
New Zealand Albums (RMNZ)	26
Swedish Albums (Sverigetopplistan)	16
Swiss Albums (Schweizer Hitparade)	3
UK Albums (Official Charts)	11
US Billboard 200	3

Chart (1998)	Peak position
UK Rock & Metal Albums (Official Charts)	40

Chart (2016)	Peak position
Canadian Albums (Billboard)	84

Chart (2020)	Peak position
US Top Rock Albums (Billboard)	13

=== Year-end charts ===
Chart (1976)	Position
Canada Top Albums/CDs (RPM)	55
Chart (1977)	Position
Canada Top Albums/CDs (RPM)	8
German Albums (Offizielle Top 100)	14
US Billboard 200	5

== Certifications ==
Region	Certification	Certified units/sales
Canada (Music Canada)	Diamond	1,000,000^{^}
New Zealand (RMNZ)	Platinum	15,000^{‡}
United Kingdom (BPI)	Gold	100,000^{^}
United States (RIAA)	17× Platinum	17,000,000^{^}
^{^} Shipments figures based on certification alone.

== See also ==
- List of best-selling albums
- List of best-selling albums in the United States
- List of diamond-certified albums in Canada
- Boston discography
