= Sib Hashian =

American drummer (1949–2017)

- Hashian in 1976

Background information
- Born: John Thomas Hashian; August 17, 1949; Boston, Massachusetts, U.S.
- Died: March 22, 2017 (aged 67) At sea near Nassau, Bahamas
- Genre: Blues rock
- Occupation: Musician
- Instrument: Drums
- Years active: 1975–2017
- Formerly of: Boston

John Thomas "Sib" Hashian (Armenian: Ջոն Թոմաս “Սիբ” Հաշիան; August 17, 1949 – March 22, 2017) was an American drummer, best known as an original member of the rock band Boston.

== Early life ==
Hashian was born on August 17, 1949 to an Armenian-American father James “Jack” Hashian (Armenian: Ջեյմս Հաշիան) and an Italian-American mother Giovanna “Jenny" Hashian (née Trovato) in Boston. He began drumming in high school, and later served in the US Army during the Vietnam War.

== Career ==
=== Boston ===
After being honorably discharged from the Army, Hashian was chosen by Boston founder and band leader Tom Scholz in 1975 to replace original drummer Jim Masdea when Epic Records requested that Masdea be replaced for recording. Hashian is heard on Boston's self-titled debut album, as well as on the follow-up Don't Look Back, although the drum parts he played on many tracks were note-for-note transcriptions of Masdea's original drum arrangements.

Hashian was involved in the early sessions for Boston's Third Stage album, but was later replaced when Masdea returned. After leaving Boston, Hashian sued Tom Scholz for back royalties and the two later settled out of court.

=== Other projects ===
Hashian was also the drummer for fellow Boston member Barry Goudreau's self-titled solo album which was released in 1980. The album achieved moderate success with the rock radio hit "Dreams".

Boston and the Barry Goudreau album were the last mainstream projects Hashian worked on. He went on to own a chain of tanning salons in Boston, as well as a small record shop. He occasionally played gigs in the Boston area with former bandmates, including Goudreau, Fran Sheehan, and Brad Delp.

In 2001 he made his first stage appearance as an actor at the Cape Cod Repertory Theater in the world premiere of the play 9-Ball written by his friend Art Devine. In 2003 he appeared on Sammy Hagar's Live: Hallelujah as an unofficial member of The Waboritas. In 2004 he returned to the stage at the Tremont Theater for the Boston premiere of 9-Ball which he also produced along with Ernie Boch Jr.

In 2005 he appeared in R U the Girl as his daughter Lauren was a contestant trying out to win the chance to perform with TLC. In 2006 he recorded with Ernie and the Automatics, a band that featured Goudreau on guitar.

In 2012 he began co-hosting Scorch's PFG-TV, a local TV show in New England, episodes of which were regularly featured on the Opie and Anthony Show, although each segment was centered on mocking PFG-TV's entire show.

== Personal life ==
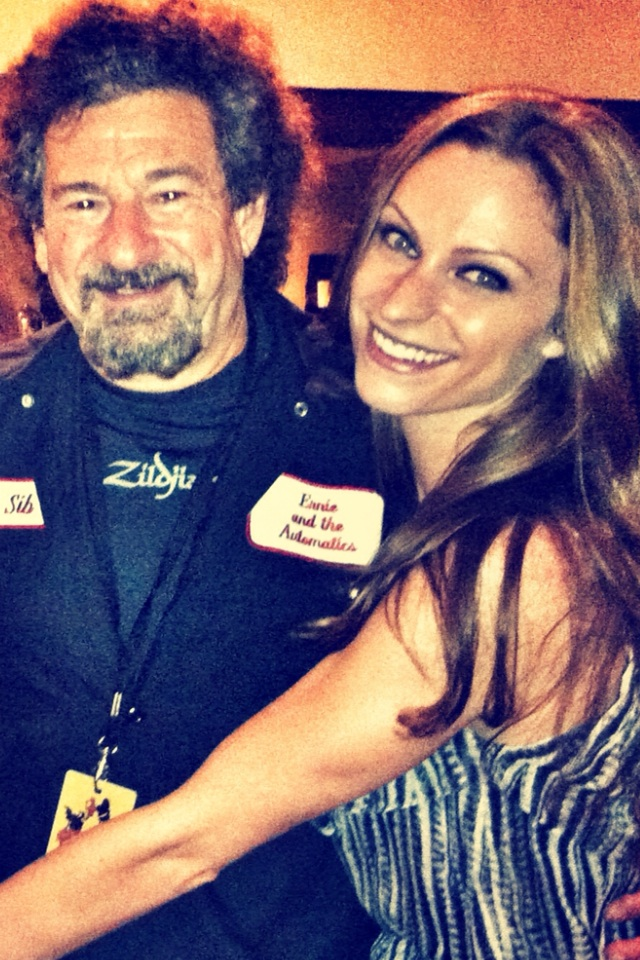
Hashian with his daughter Lauren in 2011

Hashian lived in Lynnfield, Massachusetts with his wife, Suzanne (née Jipp). They had one son, Adam, and two daughters, songwriter Aja Hashian and singer-songwriter Lauren Hashian, who was a contestant on the reality series R U the Girl in 2005. In August 2019, Lauren married Dwayne Johnson, whom she first met in 2007. Hashian is also the maternal grandfather of Lauren and Johnson's two daughters.

== Death ==
On March 22, 2017, Hashian died of a heart attack after collapsing in the middle of a set while performing on board a cruise ship, the MSC Divina, he was 67 years old. Hashian had been diagnosed with kidney cancer just months before.
