= Delp and Goudreau =

Studio album by Brad Delp and Barry Goudreau
- Released: 2003, 2011
- Recorded: 2003–2007, Goudreau's home studio
- Genre: Rock
- Length: 40:34
- Label: Delp and Goudreau, CD Baby, Frontiers
- Producer: Barry Goudreau

Delp And Goudreau features Brad Delp and Barry Goudreau with Tim Archibald, Brian Maes, David Stefanelli, Patty Barkus, Lou Spagnola, and Jack o-Soro. The album was recorded in Goudreau's home studio, featuring new tracks written by Delp and Goudreau. Archibald, Maes and Stefanelli also served in Delp and Goudreau's post-Boston RTZ and played on their first and second records.

== Track listing ==
| No. | Title | Writer(s) | Length |
|---|---|---|---|
| 1. | "What You Leave Behind" | Brad Delp, Barry Goudreau | 3:42 |
| 2. | "Hands of Time" | Delp, Goudreau, David Stefanelli | 4:18 |
| 3. | "Let It Roll" | Delp, Goudreau | 4:02 |
| 4. | "Out of My Hands" | Delp, Goudreau | 4:14 |
| 5. | "Keep On Runnin'" | Goudreau | 3:54 |
| 6. | "Everyday" | Delp, Goudreau | 3:41 |
| 7. | "I Need Your Love" | Delp, Goudreau | 4:02 |
| 8. | "The Rhythm Won't Stop" | Delp, Goudreau | 4:06 |
| 9. | "Reconciliation" | Delp, Goudreau | 4:11 |
| 10. | "My One True Love" | Delp, Brian Maes (Note: As listed in the Delp and Goudreau CD liner notes.) (Note: All songs published by Turbo Music and Key Grip Music, except "Hands of Time" (Turbo Music, Key Grip Music and Steffitunes), "Keep on Runnin'" (Turbo Music) and "My One True Love" (Key Grip Music and Shire Music).) | 4:24 |

== Personnel ==
- Brad Delp: Main Vocal
- Patty Barkus: Vocal Backing
- Barry Goudreau: Guitars, Bass, Keyboards
- Brian Maes: Keyboards, Acoustic and Electric Piano, Organ
- Tim Archibald, Lou Spagnola: Bass
- David Stefanelli: Drums, Percussion
- Mike Farius: Congas

== Production ==
The album was arranged by Brad Delp and Barry Goudreau. Tracks 1–9 were produced and recorded by Barry Goudreau. They were mixed and mastered by Dan Tarlow. "My One True Love" was produced, recorded and mixed by Dan Tarlow. It was mastered by Henk Kooistra.
