= Cosimo =

Cosimo is the Italian form of the Greek name Κοσμᾶς Kosmas (Latinised as Cosmas).

Cosimo may refer to:

== Characters ==
- Cosimo Piovasco di Rondò, hero of Italo Calvino's 1957 novel The Baron in the Trees

== Given name ==
=== Medici family ===
- Cosimo di Giovanni de' Medici (disambiguation), any of several people of the same name, including:
  - Cosimo de' Medici (1389–1464), ruler of Florence, Italy
  - Cosimo I de' Medici, Grand Duke of Tuscany (1519–1574)
- Cosimo II de' Medici, Grand Duke of Tuscany (1590–1621)
- Cosimo III de' Medici, Grand Duke of Tuscany (1642–1723)

=== Other people ===
- Cosimo Antonelli (1925–2014), Italian water polo player
- Cosimo Bartoli (1503–1572), Italian diplomat and humanist
- Cosimo Boscaglia (c.1550–1621), Italian professor of philosophy
- C. O. Brocato (1929–2015), American football player and scout
- Cosimo Caliandro (1982–2011), Italian middle-distance runner
- Cosimo Cavallaro (born 1961), Italian-Canadian artist
- Cosimo Commisso (soccer) (born 1965), Canadian former soccer player
- Cosimo Daddi (died 1630), Italian painter
- Cosimo Fancelli (c. 1620–1688), Italian sculptor
- Cosimo Fanzago (1591–1678), Italian architect and sculptor
- Cosimo Lotti (1571–1643), Italian engineer
- Cosimo Matassa (1926–2014), Italian-American studio owner
- Cosimo Morelli (1732–1812), Italian architect
- Cosimo Perrotta (born 1942), Italian professor of economic history
- Cosimo Pinto (born 1943), Italian boxer
- Cosimo Rosselli (1439–1507), Italian painter
- Cosimo Tura (c. 1430–1495), Italian painter
- Cosimo Ulivelli (1625–1704), Italian painter

=== Surname ===
- Piero di Cosimo (1462–1522), Italian painter

== See also ==
- Cosimo Commisso (disambiguation)
- Cosma (disambiguation)
- Cosmas (disambiguation)
- Cosmo (disambiguation)
- Cosmo (name)
- Kosmo (disambiguation)
