= Cosmas =

Cosmas or Kosmas is a Greek name (Ancient Greek: Κοσμᾶς), from Ancient Greek Κοσμᾶς (Kosmâs), associated with the noun κόσμος (kósmos), meaning "universe", and the verb κοσμέω (to order, govern, adorn) linked to propriety. Alternate form: Κοσμίας; female form: Κοσμώ. It may refer to:

== Saints ==
- Saints Cosmas and Damian (3rd century AD), Christian martyrs and physicians
- Cosmas the Monk, (7th century AD), a Sicilian monk and tutor
- Cosmas of Maiuma (8th century AD), Syrian bishop and hymnographer
- Cosmas of Aphrodisia (died 1160), Sicilian Bishop and Martyr
- Cosmas of Aetolia (1714-1779), Greek orthodox priestmonk and missionary

== Patriarchs ==
- Patriarch Cosmas I of Constantinople (fl. 1075–1081), Greek Orthodox Patriarch of Constantinople
- Patriarch Cosmas II of Constantinople (fl. 1146–1147), Greek Orthodox Patriarch of Constantinople
- Patriarch Cosmas I of Alexandria (727-768), Greek Orthodox Patriarch of Alexandria
- Patriarch Cosmas II of Alexandria (fl. 1714–1736), Greek Orthodox Patriarch of Alexandria
- Patriarch Cosmas III of Alexandria (fl. 1737–1746), Greek Orthodox Patriarch of Alexandria
- Pope Cosmas I of Alexandria (fl. 729–730), Coptic Patriarch of Alexandria
- Pope Cosmas II of Alexandria (fl. 851–858), Coptic Patriarch of Alexandria
- Pope Cosmas III of Alexandria (fl. 921–933), Coptic Patriarch of Alexandria

== Other people ==
- Cosmas the Priest (10th century?), Bulgarian writer
- Cosmas of Prague (1045–1125), Bohemian priest, writer and historian
- Cosmas (bishop of Győr) (fl. 1219–1222), Hungarian prelate
- Christopher and Cosmas (fl. 1587–1592), Japanese explorers
- Cosmas Damian Asam (1686-1739), German painter and architect
- Cosmas Gutkeled (fl. 1269–1321), Hungarian nobleman
- Cosmas Indicopleustes (fl. 6th century AD), Greek explorer
- Cosmas of Naples (7th century AD), Duke of Naples
- Cosmas Michael Angkur (1937–2024), Indonesian Roman Catholic bishop
- Cosmas Magaya (1953–2020), Zimbabwean mbira player
- Cosmas Ndeti (born 1971), Kenyan marathon runner
- Cosmas Zachos (born 1951), American physicist
- George Cosmas Adyebo (1945-2000), former Prime Minister of Uganda
- Johann Nepomuk Cosmas Michael Denis (1729-1800), Austrian poet, bibliographer and lepidopterist
- Kosmas Chatzicharalabous, former president of the Greek football club AEK Athens F.C.
- Kosmas Kiriakidis, former president of the Greek football club AEK Athens F.C.
- Suzanne Kosmas (born 1944), American politician

== See also ==
- Cosimo (disambiguation)
- Cosma (disambiguation)
- Cosmo (disambiguation)
- Kuzma (given name)
- Santi Cosma e Damiano (disambiguation)
