= Kuzman =

Kuzman (Bulgarian, Macedonian and Serbian Cyrillic: Кузман) is a male given name, the South Slavic variant of the Greek Cosmas. It may refer to:

- Kuzman Shapkarev (1834–1909), Bulgarian folklorist
- Kuzman Sotirović (1908–1990), Yugoslav footballer
- Pasko Kuzman (born 1947), Macedonian archaeologist
- Kuzman Babeu (born 1971), retired Serbian footballer
- Kuzman Josifovski Pitu (1915–1944), Yugoslav partisan
- Kuzman Kapidan, popular hero of Bulgarian and Macedonian epic poetry

== See also ==
- Jerry Koosman (1942–2026), American baseball player
- Kuzmanov
- Kuzmanović
- Kuzmanovski
