= Kuzmanović =

Kuzmanović (Serbian Cyrillic: Кузмановић) is a Croatian and Serbian surname, a patronymic derived from the South Slavic male given name Kuzman, a variant of the Greek Cosmas. Notable people with the surname include:

- Danilo Kuzmanović, Serbian footballer
- Dominik Kuzmanović, Croatian handballer
- Ivanka Kuzmanović, Croatian poet and historian
- Nemanja Kuzmanović, Serbian footballer
- Rajko Kuzmanović, Bosnian Serb politician
- Vladimir Kuzmanović, Serbian-born Macedonian basketball player
- Zdravko Kuzmanović, Swiss-born Serbian footballer

== See also ==
- Kuzmanovski
