= Cosmo (name) =

Cosmo (/ˈkɒzmoʊ/) is a British and Italian surname and unisex given name. It means order, decency, and beauty; this is the English form of Cosimo, introduced to Britain in the 18th century by the Scottish nobleman the second Duke of Gordon, who named his son and successor after his friend Cosimo III de' Medici. Notable people with the name include:

== Given name ==
- Cosmo and Damian, third century Christian martyrs
- Cosmo de Medici, alternate name of Cosimo de' Medici (1389–1464)
- Cosmo I, alternate name of Cosimo I de' Medici, Grand Duke of Tuscany (1519–1574)
- Cosmo Alexander (1724–1772), Scottish portrait painter
- Cosmo Alexandre (born 1982), Brazilian professional kickboxer and mixed martial artist
- Cosmo Baker (born 1974), American disc jockey
- Cosmo Kyrle Bellew (1883–1948), British-American actor
- Cosmo Bonsor, 1st Baronet (1848–1929), British MP, chairman of the South Eastern Railway
- Cosmo Campoli (1923–1997), American sculptor
- Cosmo A. Cilano (1893–1937), New York state senator
- Cosmo Crawley (1904–1989), English cricketer, rackets and real tennis player
- Cosmo D'Angeli (1889–1968), Italian painter and sculptor
- Sir Cosmo Duff-Gordon, 5th Baronet (1862–1931), British landowner, survivor of the RMS Titanic
- Cosmo Gordon, 3rd Duke of Gordon (1720–1752), Scottish nobleman
- Cosmo Gordon Lang (1864–1945), Archbishop of Canterbury
- Cosmo Graham, British professor
- Cosmo Hamilton (1870–1942), British playwright
- Cosmo Iacavazzi (born 1943), American football player
- Cosmo Innes (1798–1874), British antiquarian
- Cosmo Jarvis (born 1989), American-born English actor and musician
- Cosmo Klein (born 1978), German singer
- Cosmo Landesman (born 1954), American-born British journalist
- Cosmo Maciocia (born 1942), Canadian politician
- Cosmo Manuche, English playwright
- Cosmo Pieterse (born 1930), South African playwright, actor, poet, literary critic and anthologist
- Cosmo Pyke, English singer-songwriter, multi-instrumentalist and artist
- Cosmo Parkinson (1884–1967), British civil servant
- Cosmo Francesco Ruppi (1932–2011), Roman Catholic archbishop
- Cosmo Sheldrake (born 1989), English musician, composer, and producer
- Cosmo Whyte (born 1982), Jamaican-born American visual artist
- Cosmo Wilson (born 1961), American concert lighting designer and director for rock bands

== Surname ==
- Anthony Cosmo (lacrosse) (born 1977), Canadian lacrosse player
- Fran Cosmo (born 1956), American musician, former lead singer of the band Boston
- Guy Cosmo (born 1977), American racing driver
- James Cosmo (born 1948), British actor
- Julián Di Cosmo (born 1984), Italian-Argentine football player
- Leonardo Di Cosmo (born 1998), Italian football player
- Nicholas Cosmo (born 1971), Italian-American fund manager accused of $400 million Ponzi scheme
- Mariel Everton Cosmo Da Silva (born 1980), Brazilian football player known as "Tozo"
- Roberto Di Cosmo, Italian computer scientist
- Tony Cosmo (born 1940), American actor and rock musician

== Fictional characters ==
- Cosmo Julius Cosma, in the animated series The Fairly OddParents, Timmy and Chloe's godfather and Wanda's husband
- Cosmo, in the anime Sonic X
- Cosmo Topper, protagonist of the Topper film series
- Cosmo the Merry Martian, title character of a 1950s comic book
- Cosmo the Spacedog, a fictional psychic Russian dog appearing in Marvel Comics
- Cosmo Jones, Crime Smasher, protagonist in the 1943 American film starring Frank Graham
- Cosmo Kramer, played by Michael Richards in the NBC television sitcom Seinfeld
- Mr. Cosmo Spacely, George Jetson's boss in the 1960s cartoon The Jetsons
- Jason Cosmo, protagonist of several novels by Dan McGirt
- Cosmo Vittelli, from the 1976 John Cassavetes film The Killing of a Chinese Bookie, played by Ben Gazzara
