= Cosmopolite =

Cosmopolite may refer to:

- Cosmopolite (album) a 1956 album by Benny Carter
- Cosmopolite (butterfly) (Vanessa cardui), also known as the painted lady
- Kosmopoliet, launched in 1854, said to have been the first Dutch clipper
- World citizen, one who eschews traditional geopolitical divisions derived from national citizenship

== See also ==
- Cosmo (disambiguation)
- Cosmopolitan (disambiguation)
- Cosmopolites, a weevil genus
