= Barry Goudreau (album) =

Studio album by Barry Goudreau
- Released: August 1980 (original release; re-released by Razor & Tie in 1996)
- Genre: Hard rock
- Length: 32:51
- Label: Epic/Portrait; Stereo BL 36542
- Producer: John Boylan, Barry Goudreau

Professional ratings
Review scores
Source	Rating
allmusic	3/5 stars

Barry Goudreau is the only studio album by American guitarist and former Boston member Barry Goudreau. The album features Goudreau's bandmates with Boston Brad Delp on lead vocals, Sib Hashian on drums and Fran Cosmo (who would later join Boston in 1991), the album displays a sound very similar to that of Boston's first two releases, Boston (1976) and Don't Look Back (1978). However, neither this album nor any of Goudreau's subsequent releases with other acts (Orion the Hunter and RTZ) proved to be as commercially successful as his work with Boston. The album was released in 1980 and is Goudreau's only solo album. The song "Dreams" was released as a single in 1980, nearly cracking the USBillboard Hot 100 (#103, October 1980).

Cash Box said of "Dreams" that it is "as melodic and hook-filled as anything by Boston." Record World called it a "powerhouse rocker" and said that "Frenetic guitar leads burn over the bulldozer rhythm."

== Track listing ==
Side One (A)

1. "Hard Luck" (Barry Goudreau, Brad Delp) - 3:37
2. "Nothin' to Lose" (Fran Cosmo) – 4:01
3. "What's a Fella to Do?" (Goudreau, Delp) – 4:29
4. "Mean Woman Blues" (Goudreau, Delp) – 3:53

Side Two (B)

1. "Leavin' Tonight" (Cosmo) – 3:25
2. "Dreams" (Goudreau) – 3:32
3. "Life Is What We Make It" (Goudreau, Delp) – 3:11
4. "Sailin' Away" (Goudreau) – 1:48
5. "Cold Cold World" (Cosmo) – 4:55

== Personnel ==
- Barry Goudreau - lead guitar, vocals, bass, keyboards
- Brad Delp - lead vocals on tracks "Hard Luck", "What's a Fella to Do?", "Mean Woman Blues", "Dreams, "Life Is What We Make It" and "Sailin' Away"
- Fran Cosmo - lead vocals on tracks "Nothin' to Lose", "Leavin' Tonight" and "Cold Cold World"
- Sib Hashian - drums, percussion
- Jesse Erlich - cello
- Joy Lyle - violin
- David Schwartz - viola
- Sid Sharp - violin, concertmaster

== Production ==
- Produced By John Boylan & Barry Goudreau
- Engineered By Paul Grupp
- Assistant Engineers: Ed Cherney, Phil Jamtaas, Russ Martin
- Mastering: Steve Hoffman
- CD Preparation: Kevin Gray

== Charts ==
Albums - Billboard (United States)

Year	Album	Chart	Position
1980	Barry Goudreau	Pop Albums	88

Singles - Billboard (United States)

Year	Single	Chart	Position
1980	"Dreams"	Pop Singles	103
