= Return to Zero =

Return to Zero may refer to:

- Return-to-zero, a basic line code used in telecommunication
- Return to Zero (RTZ album), 1991
- Return to Zero (Spiritual Beggars album), 2010
- RTZ (band) (Return to Zero), an American rock band
- Return to Zero (film), a 2014 film
