= Cosma =

Cosma may refer to:

== People ==
=== Given name ===
- Cosma Orsini (died 1481), Italian Roman Catholic bishop and cardinal
- Cosma Shalizi (born 1974), American physicist, statistician, and academic
- Cosma Shiva Hagen (born 1981), German-American actress
- Cosma Spessotto (1923–1980), Italian Catholic priest

=== Surname ===
- Adrian Cosma (1950–1996), Romanian handball player
- Alice Kandaleft Cosma (c. 1895–c. 1965), Syrian diplomat and women's rights activist
- Gheorghe Cosma (1892–1969), Romanian major-general during World War II
- Maria Cosma (fl. 1970s), Romanian sprint canoeist
- Vladimir Cosma (born 1940), Romanian-born French composer and musician

== Other uses ==
- Cosma River, a river in Romania
- Cosma Foot, a French Guianese football team playing at the top level
- Cosma International, a subsidiary of automotive component manufacturer Magna International

== See also ==
- Joseph Kosma (1905–1969), Hungarian-French composer
- KOSMA, a radio telescope in Switzerland 1985–2010; moved to Tibet and renamed CCOSMA
- COMSA (disambiguation)
- Cosimo (disambiguation)
- Cosmas (disambiguation)
- Cosmo (disambiguation)
