= Commisso =

Commisso is an Italian surname. Notable people with the surname include:

- Antonio Commisso (born 1956), Italian mobster of the Commisso 'ndrina
- Cosimo Commisso (criminal) (born 1950), Italian mobster of the Commisso 'ndrina
- Cosimo Commisso (scientist), Canadian biologist
- Cosimo Commisso (soccer), Canadian soccer player
- Emilio Commisso (born 1956), Argentine footballer
- Eduardo Commisso (born 1948), Argentine footballer
- Rocco B. Commisso (1949–2026), Italian-American businessman, chairman of Mediacom Communications

== See also ==
- Commisso's Food Markets, former Canadian supermarket chain
- Commesso (disambiguation)
