= Komsa (disambiguation) =

Komsa is a Mesolithic culture of Northern Norway.

Komsa may also refer to:

- Komša, a tributary of the Pek River of Serbia
- Kŏmsa, a village in Chorwon County, North Korea
- Komsa Mountain in Queen Maud Land, Antarctica
- Xalam, known in Hausa as komsa, a stringed musical instrument

== See also ==
- COMSA (disambiguation)
- Joseph Kosma, a Hungarian-French composer
- KOSMA, a radio telescope in Switzerland
