= Kosmo =

Kosmo may refer to:

- Kosmo (GIS), a desktop geographic information system
- Kosmo, Utah, a ghost town in Box Elder County, Utah, United States
- Kosmo!, a newspaper published in Malaysia
- Kosmo.com, former online retailer and delivery service
- Jørgen Kosmo (1947–2017), Norwegian politician
- Silvia K. Kosmo (born 1977), Norwegian politician

== See also ==
- Cosmo (disambiguation)
