= Commesso (disambiguation) =

Commesso is a method of piecing together cut sections of luminous, narrow gemstones to form works of art.

Commesso may also refer to:

- Cheryl Ann Commesso, a disappeared person, found dead in 1995 in Pinellas County, Florida
- Drew Commesso (born 2002), American ice hockey goaltender
- Salvatore Commesso (born 1975), Italian professional road bicycle racer

== See also ==
- Commisso, a surname
