= A Horse at the Window =

2024 book

- Author: Spencer Gordon
- Language: Canadian English
- Published in: Canada
- Publisher: House of Anansi Press Ltd, Canada
- Publication date: 18–06–2024
- Pages: 144
- ISBN: 9781487012502

A Horse at the Window is a 2024 poetry book by Canadian author Spencer Gordon. The book is a collection of dramatic monologues.

== Publication ==
Spencer has stated that the book was originally conceived as a collection of prose poems. Revenue from the book went to charity for homeless persons in Toronto. Spencer launched the book on June 25, 2024, with Perfect Books.

== Reception ==
Michael Bryson of Zoomer found the writing to be "frequently profound". Jeff Bursey of The Miramichi Reader gave the book a positive review, stating that it is a "pleasing work of ideas". Alexander Sallas reviewed the book for the Bookworm podcast of Literary Review of Canada. Dana Hansen, editor of the Hamilton Review of Books, picked the book as one of his favorites of the year. Fellow authors Rob Benvie and Damian Tarnopolsky both praised the book.

Spencer withdrew the book from the nominations for the Giller Prize due to its sponsors connections to gas stations in the West Bank.

== See also ==
- Cosmo by Spencer Gordon
- Cruise Missile Liberals by Spencer Gordon
