= Kelton, Utah =

- Ghost town
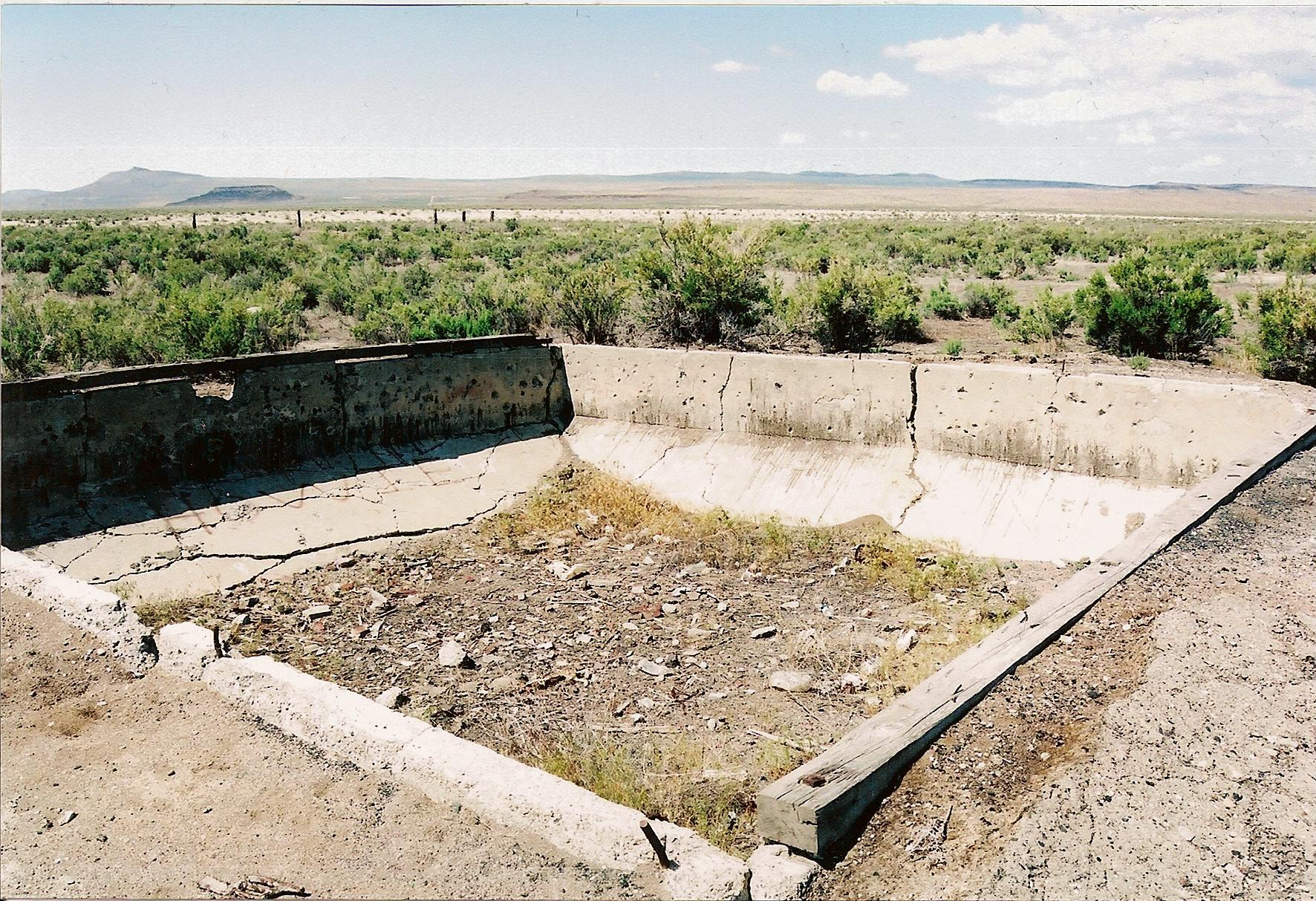
- Empty foundation at Kelton

- Location within Utah Location within the United States
- Coordinates: 41°44′46″N 113°06′23″W
- Country: United States
- State: Utah
- County: Box Elder
- Founded: 1869
- Abandoned: 1942
- Elevation: 4,229 ft (1,289 m)
- GNIS feature ID: 1437603

Kelton is a ghost town, just north of the Great Salt Lake, in the Park Valley area of Box Elder County, Utah, United States. The town was inhabited during the period of 1869–1942. Once an important section station on the First transcontinental railroad, Kelton was dependent on the railroad throughout its history. The town suffered serious setbacks in the 1880s when its busy stagecoach route to Boise, Idaho was discontinued, and in the 1900s when the Lucin Cutoff left it off the main rail line. The strongest earthquake in Utah history caused severe damage in 1934, but Kelton ceased to exist only when the rails were completely removed during World War II.

== History ==
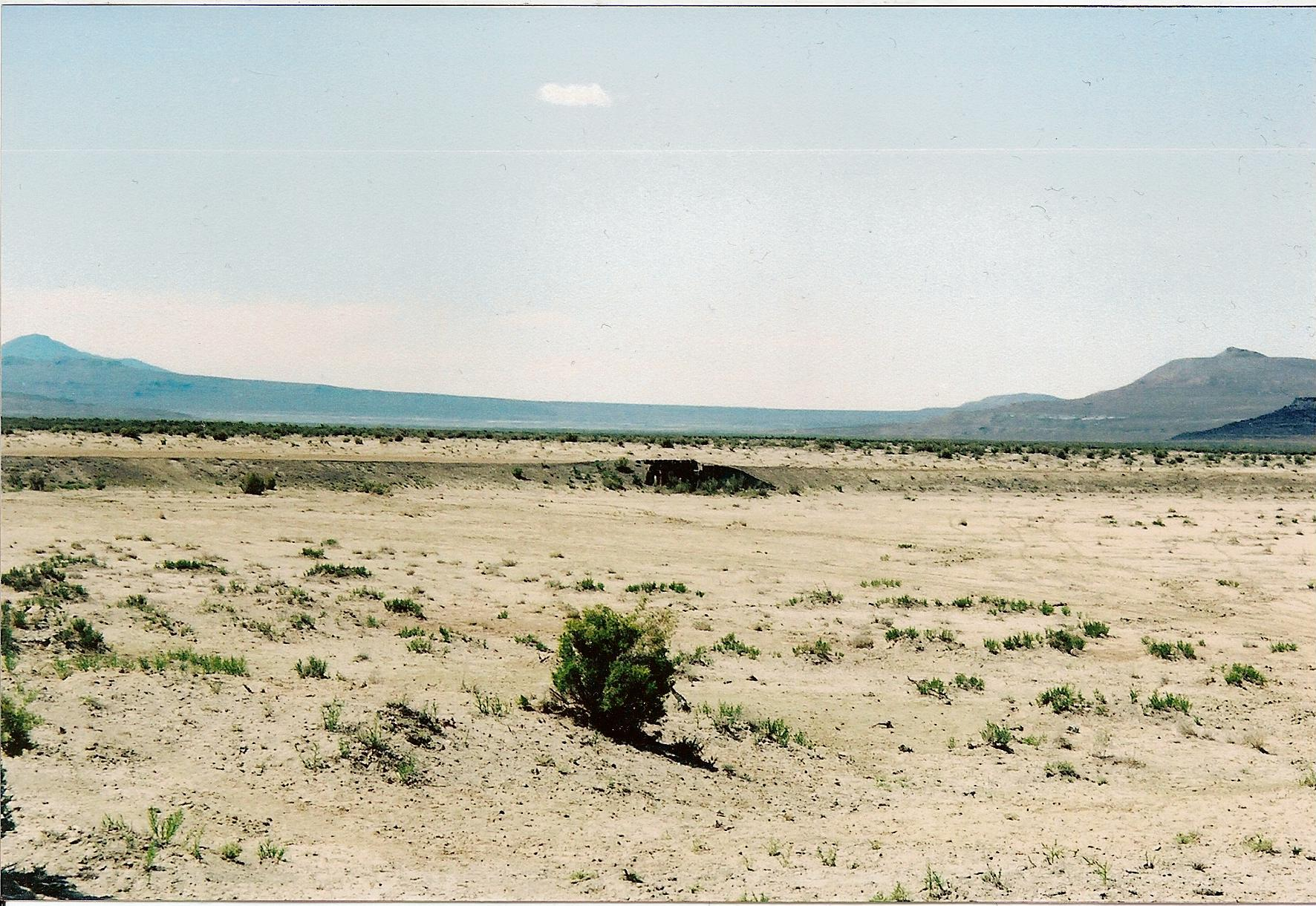
The old railroad grade, south of Kelton, that is part of the Central Pacific Railroad Grade Historic District, May 2007

The site was first settled under the name of Indian Creek, when the mostly-Chinese work crew of the Central Pacific Railroad arrived on April 12, 1869, less than a month before the driving of the golden spike. When the post office was established here on December 16, 1869, it was named Kelton, after an early stockman. It quickly grew into a prosperous town, soon including several fine hotels, stores, homes, a whole row of saloons and gambling halls, and even a telephone exchange.

Kelton was ideally positioned to link the railroad to the large northern markets of Oregon, Idaho, and Montana. Already by the summer of 1869 a stagecoach route was established between Kelton and Boise, Idaho. By 1871 the Kelton Freight Road was the best road leading into southwestern Idaho. In the 1870s and early 1880s, the Wells Fargo stage line running between Kelton and several gold mines in Idaho and Montana was robbed more often than any other stage line in the Old West. Treasure hunters still search for the hundreds of thousands of unrecovered dollars rumored to be cached in the nearby City of Rocks.

=== Decline ===
Historical population
Census	Pop.	Note	%±
1870	101		—
1880	135		33.7%
1890	77		−43.0%
1900	85		10.4%
1910	58		−31.8%
1920	50		−13.8%
1930	47		−6.0%
1940	33		−29.8%
1950	0		−100.0%

The importance of the freight road waned as the Oregon Short Line Railroad and the Utah Northern Railroad pushed into Oregon, Idaho, and Montana. By July 1884 the stage route was defunct, but Kelton still had the transcontinental railroad. Even that was taken away in 1903–1904, when the main line was relocated to the south to a route called the Lucin Cutoff, across the Great Salt Lake itself. Kelton's former section was relegated to a mere backup line, used in case of high water, and to service local farmers and ranchers. There was so little traffic on the line that the weekly local train would often stop for a half-hour of rabbit hunting.

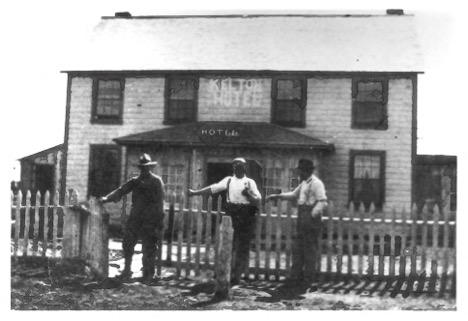
Kelton Hotel, about 1905

On the morning of March 12, 1934, Kelton was hit by the most powerful earthquake ever recorded in Utah. At a magnitude of 6.6 and an intensity of VIII, the Hansel Valley quake and its aftershocks might have been devastating in a densely populated area, but only two people were killed. Great fissures and holes opened in the earth, muddy water gushing from them. Houses and other buildings were severely shaken, and the Kelton schoolhouse was left leaning at such a precarious angle that it had to be abandoned.

As late as 1937 Kelton was still an important local shipping point, and a population of 47 remained. The final death blow came suddenly, when the Southern Pacific Railroad completely dismantled the old railway line in a week, July 1–8, 1942, and contributed the hardware to the war effort. The last residents of Kelton left, taking some of the houses with them. Nothing remains but some ruins, fallen buildings and abandoned foundations, and a deteriorating cemetery. The railroad grade is still clearly visible, although many of the trestles are falling down.

== Climate ==
According to the Köppen Climate Classification system, Kelton has a semi-arid climate, abbreviated "BSk" on climate maps.

== See also ==
- List of ghost towns in Utah
- Central Pacific Railroad Grade Historic District
