= Lost (RTZ album) =

Studio album by RTZ
- Released: September 28, 1998
- Recorded: 1998
- Genres: Hard rock; pop rock; arena rock
- Length: 43:32
- Labels: MTM Music; Avalon Japan
- Producer: Barry Goudreau

RTZ chronology
Return to Zero (1991)	Lost (1998)	Lost and Found (2004)

Professional ratings
Review scores
Source	Rating
AllMusic	3/5 stars

Lost is the second and final album by American rock band RTZ. It was released in 1998 by MTM Music and Avalon Japan. It was reissued in 2000 with a bonus track, and again in 2005 under the title Lost in America.

== Track listing ==
All songs written by Delp and Goudreau, except where noted.

1. "When You Love Someone" – 4:34
2. "Turn This Love Around" (Delp, Goudreau, Stefanelli, Troy) – 4:16
3. "Someday" – 4:19
4. "Violent Days" – 4:07
5. "Change for Change" – 3:59
6. "One in a Million" – 4:34
7. "Given You Up for Dead" – 4:24
8. "Don't Wait" – 4:46
9. "Talk to Me" – 4:40
10. "Don't Lead Me On" – 4:23
11. "Dangerous"* – 4:04
- Track 11 is a bonus track that was added in 2000 and subsequent reissues.

== Personnel ==
- Brad Delp: Lead and backing vocals
- Barry Goudreau: Electric and acoustic guitars, backing vocals
- Brian Maes: Keyboards, piano, backing vocals
- Tim Archibald: Bass
- David Stefanelli: Drums, percussion

== Production ==
- Produced and engineered by Barry Goudreau
- Mastered by Henk Kooistra
