= Cosmopolitan =

Cosmopolitan may refer to:

== Internationalism ==
- World citizen, one who eschews traditional geopolitical divisions derived from national citizenship
- Cosmopolitanism, the idea that all of humanity belongs to a single moral community
- Cosmopolitan localism, a way of linking local communities in global networks that bring production and consumption closer together

== Media ==
- Cosmopolitan (magazine), a magazine for women, sometimes referred to as "Cosmo"
- Cosmopolitan (film), a 2003 film starring Roshan Seth
- Cosmopolitan Television, a satellite/cable television channel
- Cosmopolitan Productions, a defunct United States film production company

== Science ==
- Cosmopolitan distribution, in biogeography, biological categories which can be found almost anywhere around the world
- Cosmopolitan (Vanessa cardui) or painted lady, a butterfly
- Cosmopolitan (Leucania loreyi) or false army worm, a moth

== Vehicles ==
- CC-109 Cosmopolitan, an aircraft, the RCAF version of the Canadair CL-66
- Cosmopolitan automobile company, a defunct American car maker
- Nash Cosmopolitan, a defunct car model from Nash Motors

== Other ==
- Cosmopolitan (cocktail), also known as a "Cosmo"
- Cosmopolitan of Las Vegas, a resort casino and hotel in Las Vegas, Nevada
- Cosmopolitan Hotel in Hong Kong

== See also ==
- Cosmo (disambiguation)
- Cosmopolite (disambiguation)
- Rootless cosmopolitan, a Soviet derogatory epithet during Joseph Stalin's antisemitic campaign of 1949–1953
