= Orion the Hunter (album) =

Studio album by Orion the Hunter
- Released: May 1984
- Recorded: 1983–1984
- Studios: Power Station and Blue Jay Studios
- Genre: Hard rock
- Length: 42:29
- Label: Portrait
- Producers: Barry Goudreau, Lennie Petze

Orion the Hunter is the only album from the band Orion the Hunter, which was an offshoot of the band Boston. Guitarist Barry Goudreau and backing vocalist Brad Delp were members of Boston, and guitarist/vocalist Fran Cosmo would join a later incarnation of the band. The group also included Michael DeRosier (from the group Heart) on drums and percussion, and Bruce Smith on bass.

The album was released in 1984 and charted at number 57. It featured the single "So You Ran", which was a rock radio top 10 hit; it also charted on the Billboard Hot 100.

== Reception ==
Professional ratings
Review scores
Source	Rating
allmusic	2/5 stars

Allmusic's Doug Stone retrospectively gave the album two stars. Saying of the songs "Fast Talk", "Dreamin'" and "I Call It Love": "[they are] good, professional rock tunes. Maybe too professional, as they come off a bit cold". He went on to say that "even though Orion the Hunter holds some personal nostalgia, too many albums deserve more attention".

== Track listing ==
- All songs published by Papier-Mache Music.
1. All Those Years
  (Brad Delp, Barry Goudreau, Francisco Migliaccio) 4:50
2. So You Ran
  (Barry Goudreau, Francisco Migliaccio) 4:58
3. Dreamin'
  (Barry Goudreau, Francisco Migliaccio) 5:26
4. Dark & Stormy
  (Barry Goudreau, Francisco Migliaccio) 5:15
5. Stand Up
  (Barry Goudreau, Francisco Migliaccio) 5:18
6. Fast Talk
  (Barry Goudreau, Francisco Migliaccio) 4:15
7. Too Much In Love
  (Brad Delp, Barry Goudreau, Francisco Migliaccio, Joseph Piercy) 3:51
8. Joanne
  (Brad Delp, Francisco Migliaccio, Bruce Smith) 4:27
9. I Call It Love
  (Brad Delp, Barry Goudreau, Francisco Migliaccio) 3:52

== Personnel ==
=== Orion the Hunter ===
- Fran Cosmo - lead vocals, acoustic and electric guitars, phased guitar (on "Stand Up")
- Barry Goudreau - lead, rhythm, slide and 12-string guitars, backing vocals
- Bruce Smith - bass, backing vocals
- Michael DeRosier - drums, percussion

=== Additional personnel ===
- Brad Delp - additional vocals
- Lennie Petze - additional guitars ("Chuka Chuka") on "So You Ran"
- Steve Baker - grand piano
- Jimmy Bralower, John Schuller and Peter Wood - keyboards, synthesizers

=== Technical personnel ===
- Production - Barry Goudreau and Lennie Petze
- Recording and engineering - Josh Abbey, Larry Alexander and Gregg Lunsford
- Assistant engineers - Ted Greenwald and Gary Lindquist
- Mixing - Tony Bongiovi
- Mastering - Steve Hoffman
