= Cosimo Commisso =

Cosimo Commisso may refer to:

- Cosimo Commisso (mobster), Italian criminal and member of the 'Ndrangheta
- Cosimo Commisso (scientist), Canadian biologist
- Cosimo Commisso (soccer) (born 1965), Canadian soccer player
