= Cruise Missile Liberals =

2017 poetry collection

- Author: Spencer Gordon
- Language: Canadian English
- Genre: Satire
- Published: Gibsons, British Columbia
- Publisher: Nightwood Editions
- Publication date: October 1, 2017
- Publication place: Canada
- Media type: poetry collection
- ISBN: 9780889713338

Cruise Missile Liberals is a 2017 poetry collection. It is the debut poetry book of Canadian writer Spencer Gordon. The book features satirical poems with themes of politics and or popular culture.

== Reception ==
The book received positive reviews. CBC Books called it "highly experimental, highly witty and ... dripping with charisma". Barb Carey of the Toronto Star found it to be funny and heartfelt while noting that the material shows off Gordon's "acerbic wit" and "knack for nifty turns of phrase". The Globe and Mail's Domenica Martinello gave the book a positive review, characterizing it as absurdist and vivid in its tackling of societal ills. Stevie Howell of Quill & Quire gave the book a starred review, describing it as a "complex and accomplished first collection from a writer who has honed his voice by listening". Jonathan Ball of Winnipeg Free Press called it "[A book of] disturbing, wry intelligence … [and] taut, careful craft". Tim Conley of the journal Canadian Literature states that the book is fun and features "bored Epicureanism with at least a shot of suburban self-loathing", summarising that it mixes positive and negative attributes. Phillipe Pamela Dungao of Broken Pencil reviewed its titular poem and found it to be a complex reflection of life in the modern day.

== See also ==
- Cosmo by Spencer Gordon
- A Horse at the Window by Spencer Gordon
- Canadian poetry
