= 1934 Hansel Valley earthquake =

Earthquake in Utah

- Location within Utah
- UTC time: 1934-03-12 15:05:41
- ISC event: 904837
- USGS-ANSS: ComCat
- Local date: March 12, 1934
- Local time: 08:05 a.m. MST
- Magnitude: M_{w} 6.6
- Depth: 10.0 km (6.2 mi)
- Epicenter: 41.7°N 112.8°W
- Type: Normal
- Areas affected: Utah, southern Idaho
- Max. intensity: MMI VIII (Severe)
- Aftershocks: M_{w} 5.9 Mar 12 at 18:20 UTC
- Casualties: 2 dead

The 1934 Hansel Valley earthquake occurred on March 12 at approximately 8:05 a.m. MST with a moment magnitude of 6.6 and a maximum Mercalli intensity of VIII (Severe). The shock originated in the Hansel Valley at the north end of the Great Salt Lake in Utah in the United States. Damage was mostly confined to vulnerable buildings, and two people died. The dip-slip (normal) fault that generated the shock ruptured the surface of the ground and other geologic features were documented. A large aftershock occurred three hours after the initial event and may have caused additional damage.

== Tectonic setting ==
Situated in southern Nevada, Utah, Idaho, western Wyoming and western Montana, the Intermountain Seismic Belt (ISB) is a region of crustal stretching and intraplate deformation. This results in a 810 mi (1,300 km) zone of active tectonics, with uplift in the mountains and comparative subsidence in the valleys. This area follows California and Western Nevada in the lower 48 states in terms of seismic risk.

Within the ISB, the Basin and Range Province is a region of extensional tectonics and lays between the Sierra Nevada in the west and the Colorado Plateau in the east. It comprises north-trending mountains that are mostly uniform in height and are separated by flat valleys with mostly consistent widths. The prevalent fault type in this area is dip-slip (normal).

== Earthquake ==
The magnitude 6.6 shock occurred on an unnamed and north-trending normal fault that slipped over a distance of 6.8 miles (11 km). Surface rupture was present but may not have reached the surface over the entire length. The maximum vertical offset was 1 foot 8 inches (.5 m).

=== Aftershocks ===
Several hundred aftershocks occurred over the following days and weeks. The most significant of these was a magnitude 5.9 shock that took place a little over three hours after the mainshock. The damage that resulted from this less severe event could not be distinguished from the initial one, but it was also felt in Idaho, Nevada, and Wyoming.

Several other events made the record books at the University of Utah. On March 15, there were two shocks of magnitude 5.1 and 4.8 with assumed (as opposed to observed) intensities of VI (Strong) and V (Moderate). Around one month later on April 14 there was another earthquake of magnitude 5.6 with an observed intensity of VII (Very strong) and on May 6 another one also measured at 5.6 with an intensity of VI (all in Richter magnitude).

=== Intensity ===
==== Mainshock ====
The mainshock is depicted by a United States Geological Survey isoseismal map with a relatively small zone with the maximum felt intensity of VIII (Severe) at the north end of the Great Salt Lake. Salt Lake City and the extreme southern portion of Idaho lay in the intensity VI (Strong) zone and Pocatello, Idaho lay just to the north within the intensity V (Moderate) zone.

==== Aftershock ====
The most significant aftershock took place on the same day as the mainshock. The National Geophysical Data Center declared that its intensity peaked at VI (Strong) only in Utah at Kosmo and Monument. It was felt with an intensity of V (Moderate) in Logan and Ogden, both in Utah. Pocatello and Twin Falls, Idaho both reported an intensity of IV (Light), as did Salt Lake City. At 400 miles (644 km) distant from the epicentral area, it was felt in Cheyenne, Wyoming with an intensity of III (Weak).

=== Damage ===
The meizoseismal area was mostly unpopulated, but there were a few small towns that experienced damage to mostly weaker structures. Cracked walls and damage to chimneys was reported in Logan, Hooper, Kelton, Kosmo, Locomotive Springs, Monument, and Snowville. At least two people were killed. Plaster fell from the ceilings of many upper rooms in the Logan Temple.

=== Ground effects ===
Following a 20th-century field survey of the affected areas, features such as large rock slides, previously dormant wells and springs, and an increase in the flow of an oil seep were documented. The surveyor reported that in areas where surface faulting was present, it was discontinuous and it did not occur in bedrock and was mostly observed in unconsolidated rocks or salt flats.

In the 21st-century, seismologists were able to validate that the surface ruptures were of tectonic origin (as opposed to secondary surface effects) using a vertical seismic profile process. This modern technique uses various instruments placed in boreholes along an area of interest, which gather data from an artificial seismic source. The study showed that the slip was vertical near the surface, but horizontal at depth, indicating a transtensional environment.

== Aftermath ==
The Salt Lake City and County Building was dedicated in 1894 well before earthquake engineering developed. For some time it was Utah's tallest building and it experienced minor damage during earthquakes, including the 1934 shock. The building was eventually retrofitted with a seismic base isolation system to avoid resonance of the building during future events.

== See also ==
- List of earthquakes in 1934
- List of earthquakes in Utah
