= List of earthquakes in 1934 =

Earthquakes in 1934
Approximate epicenters of notable earthquakes in 1934
- 4.0–5.9 magnitude
- 6.0–6.9 magnitude
- 7.0–7.9 magnitude
- 8.0+ magnitude
- Strongest: Nepal, Sagarmatha Zone (Magnitude 8.0) January 15
- Deadliest: Nepal, Sagarmatha Zone (Magnitude 8.0) January 15 12,000 deaths
- Total fatalities: 12,007

Number by magnitude
- 9.0+: 0

This is a list of earthquakes in 1934. Only magnitude 6.0 or greater earthquakes appear on the list. Lower magnitude events are included if they have caused death, injury or damage. Events which occurred in remote areas will be excluded from the list as they wouldn't have generated significant media interest. All dates are listed according to UTC time. The largest and deadliest event was the great earthquake which struck Nepal in January. In that magnitude 8.0 quake, 12,000 people died. Other parts of the world saw much activity with the Philippines, the Solomon Islands, Dutch East Indies and New Guinea seeing much instability. Apart from the devastating Nepal earthquake, no other event caused more than 10 deaths which is unusual for any year.

== Overall ==
=== By death toll ===
Rank	Death toll	Magnitude	Location	MMI	Depth (km)	Date
1	12,000	8.0	Nepal, Sagarmatha Zone	XI (Extreme)	15.0	January 15

- Note: At least 10 casualties

=== By magnitude ===
Rank	Magnitude	Death toll	Location	MMI	Depth (km)	Date
1	8.0	12,000	Nepal, Sagarmatha Zone	XI (Extreme)	15.0	January 15
2	7.7	0	British Solomon Islands, Santa Cruz Islands	( )	10.0	July 18
= 3	7.5	0	Philippines, west of Luzon	( )	15.0	February 14
= 3	7.5	0	Japan, Volcano Islands	( )	35.0	February 24
= 3	7.5	0	Panama, south of	( )	30.0	July 18
= 4	7.3	0	British Solomon Islands, Santa Cruz Islands	( )	15.0	July 21
= 4	7.3	0	Fiji, south of	( )	540.0	October 10
= 5	7.2	2	New Zealand, off the west coast of North Island	( )	35.0	March 5
= 5	7.2	0	Tibet, Tibet (1912-1951)	( )	35.0	December 15
= 6	7.1	0	New Guinea, north of New Britain	( )	35.0	February 28
= 6	7.1	0	Philippines, east of Mindanao	( )	35.0	April 15
= 6	7.1	0	Mexico, off the coast of Jalisco	( )	15.0	November 30
= 7	7.0	0	British Solomon Islands, Santa Cruz Islands	( )	15.0	March 24
= 7	7.0	0	Dutch East Indies, northern Sumatra	( )	130.0	May 1

- Note: At least 7.0 magnitude

== Notable events ==
=== January ===
January
- Strongest: 8.0 M_{w} Nepal
- Deadliest: 8.0 M_{w} Nepal; 10,600 deaths
- Total fatalities: 10,602

Number by magnitude
- 8.0–8.9: 1
- 7.0–7.9: 0
- 6.0–6.9: 11

Date	Country and location	M_{w}	Depth (km)	MMI	Notes	Casualties	
Date	Country and location	M_{w}	Depth (km)	MMI	Notes	Dead	Injured
1	Dutch East Indies, Flores Sea	6.5	60.0				
3	Russian SFSR, western Kamchatka Krai	6.9	350.0				
9	Argentina, Santiago del Estero Province	6.0	630.0				
12	China, Yunnan Province	6.0	35.0	VIII	1 person died and another 14 were injured. Many homes were destroyed.	1	14
15	Nepal, Sagarmatha Zone	8.0	15.0	XI	Major destruction was caused by the 1934 Nepal-Bihar earthquake. 10,600 deaths were reported. Many homes were destroyed. This was one of the worst disasters in Nepalese history.	10,600	
16	Philippines, southern Mindanao	6.2	35.0				
18	Fiji	6.5	580.0				
19	China, Yunnan Province	6.0	35.0				
20	China, Inner Mongolia	6.3	15.0	VIII	1 person died and many homes were destroyed.	1	
28	Mexico, Guerrero	6.8	30.0				
30	United States, western Nevada	6.5	0.0		Depth unknown.		
31	Tonga	6.5	25.0				

=== February ===
February
- Strongest: 7.5 M_{w} 2 events
- Total fatalities: 0

Number by magnitude
- 8.0–8.9: 0
- 7.0–7.9: 3
- 6.0–6.9: 13

Date	Country and location	M_{w}	Depth (km)	MMI	Notes	Casualties	
Date	Country and location	M_{w}	Depth (km)	MMI	Notes	Dead	Injured
2	Dutch East Indies, south of Papua (province)	6.3	15.0				
3	New Guinea, East New Britain Province	6.7	35.0				
4	United States, Northern Mariana Islands	6.5	570.0				
4	Iran, Kohgiluyeh and Boyer-Ahmad Province	6.5	15.0				
4	Dutch East Indies, Banda Sea	6.3	25.0				
9	New Guinea, East New Britain Province	6.4	15.0		Different location to event from a few days earlier in New Guinea.		
9	Fiji	6.5	230.0				
11	New Guinea, southwest of Bougainville Island	6.5	80.0				
12	Laos, Sainyabuli Province	6.2	35.0				
14	Dutch East Indies, south of Sulawesi	6.2	100.0				
14	Philippines, west of Luzon	7.5	15.0		Some damage was caused.		
19	Dutch East Indies, Mentawai Islands	6.3	27.5				
24	Nicaragua, Chinandega Department	6.0	200.0				
24	Japan, Volcano Islands	7.5	35.0				
27	New Guinea, southwest of Bougainville Island	6.5	180.0				
28	New Guinea, off the north coast of New Britain	7.1	15.0				

=== March ===
March
- Strongest: 7.2 M_{w} New Zealand
- Deadliest: 6.6 M_{w} United States; 2 deaths
- Total fatalities: 2

Number by magnitude
- 8.0–8.9: 0
- 7.0–7.9: 2
- 6.0–6.9: 10

Date	Country and location	M_{w}	Depth (km)	MMI	Notes	Casualties	
Date	Country and location	M_{w}	Depth (km)	MMI	Notes	Dead	Injured
1	New Guinea, east of mainland	6.3	20.0				
1	Chile, Los Lagos Region	6.6	15.0				
5	New Zealand, off the west coast of North Island	7.2	35.0				
7	Honduras, south of	6.2	35.0				
12	United States, northern Utah	6.6	0.0	VIII	Main article: 1934 Hansel Valley earthquake	2	
13	British Solomon Islands, Santa Cruz Islands	6.6	15.0				
15	New Zealand, western Hastings, New Zealand	6.3	25.0				
16	New Guinea, Madang Province	6.8	35.0				
18	Russian SFSR, Kuril Islands	6.8	100.0				
20	New Guinea, northwest of New Britain	6.6	15.0				
24	British Solomon Islands	7.0	15.0				
29	Romania, Vrancea County	6.2	150.0				

=== April ===
April
- Strongest: 7.1 M_{w} Philippines
- Total fatalities: 0

Number by magnitude
- 8.0–8.9: 0
- 7.0–7.9: 1
- 6.0–6.9: 13

Date	Country and location	M_{w}	Depth (km)	MMI	Notes	Casualties	
Date	Country and location	M_{w}	Depth (km)	MMI	Notes	Dead	Injured
2	Dutch East Indies, Molucca Sea	6.0	50.0				
3	Colombia, off the west coast	6.0	35.0				
10	Dutch East Indies, Kangean Islands	6.4	20.0				
11	New Hebrides	6.8	150.0				
11	Dutch East Indies, Kangean Islands	6.0	35.0		Aftershock.		
15	Japan, Izu Islands	6.5	70.0				
15	Philippines, Mindanao	7.1	35.0				
16	Philippines, east of Mindanao	6.0	35.0		Aftershock.		
16	Taiwan, southeast of	6.0	35.0				
19	Japan, south of Honshu	6.5	430.0				
24	Dutch East Indies, Banda Sea	6.0	35.0				
26	Dutch East Indies, north of Minahassa Peninsula, Sulawesi	6.2	35.0				
26	New Hebrides	6.5	35.0				
28	New Guinea, north of New Britain	6.0	35.0				

=== May ===
May
- Strongest: 7.0 M_{w} Dutch East Indies
- Total fatalities: 0

Number by magnitude
- 8.0–8.9: 0
- 7.0–7.9: 1
- 6.0–6.9: 5

Date	Country and location	M_{w}	Depth (km)	MMI	Notes	Casualties	
Date	Country and location	M_{w}	Depth (km)	MMI	Notes	Dead	Injured
1	Dutch East Indies, northern Sumatra	7.0	130.0				
4	United States, southern Alaska	6.9	25.0				
13	New Guinea, southeast of New Ireland (island)	6.4	35.0				
14	United States, Kodiak Island, Alaska	6.5	60.0				
19	Guatemala, Solola Department	6.2	120.0				
30	Japan, Ibaraki Prefecture, Honshu	6.0	70.0				

=== June ===
June
- Strongest: 6.9 M_{w} 3 events
- Total fatalities: 0

Number by magnitude
- 8.0–8.9: 0
- 7.0–7.9: 0
- 6.0–6.9: 16
- 5.0–5.9: 1

Date	Country and location	M_{w}	Depth (km)	MMI	Notes	Casualties	
Date	Country and location	M_{w}	Depth (km)	MMI	Notes	Dead	Injured
2	British Burma, Sagaing Region	6.5	130.0				
2	Iceland, Northeastern Region (Iceland)	6.2	35.0	VIII			
2	United States, southern Alaska	6.3	0.0		Depth unknown.		
3	New Hebrides	6.5	120.0				
8	United States, Parkfield, California	5.8	6.0	VIII	Some damage was reported at Parkfield.		
9	New Guinea, Morobe Province	6.9	137.5				
11	Argentina, Cordoba Province, Argentina	6.0	100.0		This is an example of a doublet earthquake.		
11	Argentina, Cordoba Province, Argentina	6.0	100.0				
12	Mexico, off the coast of Oaxaca	6.0	35.0				
13	Iran, Sistan and Baluchestan Province	6.7	10.0				
15	New Guinea, off the east coast of mainland	6.0	35.0				
18	United States, Kenai Peninsula, Alaska	6.0	15.0				
22	New Guinea, west of New Ireland (island)	6.0	35.0				
23	China, Qinghai Province	6.0	35.0				
24	Chile, Antofagasta Region	6.9	100.0				
29	Dutch East Indies, Banda Sea	6.9	610.0				
29	Dutch East Indies, south of Sulawesi	6.2	670.0				

=== July ===
July
- Strongest: 7.7 M_{w} British Solomon Islands
- Total fatalities: 0

Number by magnitude
- 8.0–8.9: 0
- 7.0–7.9: 3
- 6.0–6.9: 11

Date	Country and location	M_{w}	Depth (km)	MMI	Notes	Casualties	
Date	Country and location	M_{w}	Depth (km)	MMI	Notes	Dead	Injured
6	United States, off the coast of northern California	6.7	15.0				
18	Panama, off the south coast	7.5	30.0		4 people were injured and some damage was caused. Costs were $50,000 (1934 rate).		4
18	Panama, off the south coast	6.6	20.0		Aftershock.		
18	Panama, off the south coast	6.0	35.0		Aftershock.		
18	Panama, off the south coast	6.8	25.0		Aftershock.		
18	Panama, off the south coast	6.8	25.0		Aftershock.		
18	British Solomon Islands, Santa Cruz Islands	7.7	10.0				
19	Dutch East Indies, Papua (province)	6.9	15.0				
19	New Hebrides	6.9	15.0				
21	British Solomon Islands, Santa Cruz Islands	7.3	15.0		Aftershock.		
21	Panama, off the south coast	6.7	25.0		Aftershock.		
27	Mexico, Chiapas	6.2	50.0				
28	United States, south of Alaska	6.7	20.0				
31	Dutch East Indies, off the west coast of northern Sumatra	6.0	35.0				

=== August ===
August
- Strongest: 6.9 M_{w} Philippines
- Deadliest: 6.3 M_{w} Taiwan; 3 deaths
- Total fatalities: 3

Number by magnitude
- 8.0–8.9: 0
- 7.0–7.9: 0
- 6.0–6.9: 10

Date	Country and location	M_{w}	Depth (km)	MMI	Notes	Casualties	
Date	Country and location	M_{w}	Depth (km)	MMI	Notes	Dead	Injured
2	Dutch East Indies, Papua (province)	6.4	35.0				
2	United States, southern Alaska	6.0	0.0		Depth unknown.		
6	Colombia, off the west coast	6.0	35.0				
7	British Solomon Islands, Santa Cruz Islands	6.8	15.0				
11	Taiwan, Yilan County, Taiwan	6.3	10.0		3 people were killed and 6 homes were destroyed.	3	
11	New Guinea, off the south coast of New Britain	6.3	35.0				
12	Philippines, off the east coast of Mindanao	6.9	35.0				
21	Dutch East Indies, Batu Islands	6.2	35.0				
31	United Kingdom, Baffin Bay	6.3	15.0				
31	Tajik SSR, Districts of Republican Subordination	6.5	15.0				

=== September ===
September
- Strongest: 6.5 M_{w} New Guinea
- Total fatalities: 0

Number by magnitude
- 8.0–8.9: 0
- 7.0–7.9: 0
- 6.0–6.9: 5

Date	Country and location	M_{w}	Depth (km)	MMI	Notes	Casualties	
Date	Country and location	M_{w}	Depth (km)	MMI	Notes	Dead	Injured
6	Philippines, Mindanao	6.0	150.0				
11	Dutch East Indies, Minahassa Peninsula, Sulawesi	6.2	130.0				
15	Mexico, Jalisco	6.2	35.0				
21	Dutch East Indies, northern Sumatra	6.2	100.0				
25	New Guinea, New Britain	6.5	100.0				

=== October ===
October
- Strongest: 7.3 M_{w} Fiji
- Total fatalities: 0

Number by magnitude
- 8.0–8.9: 0
- 7.0–7.9: 1
- 6.0–6.9: 6

Date	Country and location	M_{w}	Depth (km)	MMI	Notes	Casualties	
Date	Country and location	M_{w}	Depth (km)	MMI	Notes	Dead	Injured
5	Japan, south of Hokkaido	6.2	35.0				
10	Fiji, south of	7.3	540.0				
18	British Solomon Islands, Santa Cruz Islands	6.5	35.0				
21	United States, Northern Mariana Islands	6.5	210.0				
26	Dutch East Indies, Banda Sea	6.8	550.0				
26	Japan, southeast of the Ryukyu Islands	6.5	20.0				
29	Peru, Amazonas Region	6.2	110.0				

=== November ===
November
- Strongest: 7.1 M_{w} Mexico
- Total fatalities: 0

Number by magnitude
- 8.0–8.9: 0
- 7.0–7.9: 1
- 6.0–6.9: 10

Date	Country and location	M_{w}	Depth (km)	MMI	Notes	Casualties	
Date	Country and location	M_{w}	Depth (km)	MMI	Notes	Dead	Injured
4	Fiji, south of	6.6	15.0				
4	France, southeast of Loyalty Islands	6.5	15.0				
5	United States, Andreanof Islands, Alaska	6.5	0.0		Depth unknown.		
9	Greece, Dodecanese Islands	6.2	140.0				
12	Turkey, Bingol Province	6.0	35.0				
16	New Guinea, Bismarck Sea	6.5	15.0				
18	Afghanistan, Badakhshan Province	6.5	220.0				
18	New Guinea, east of New Ireland (island)	6.5	35.0				
26	Philippines, west of Luzon	6.2	35.0				
27	Dutch East Indies, Molucca Sea	6.4	15.0				
30	Mexico, off the coast of Jalisco	7.1	15.0		Major damage was caused.		

=== December ===
December
- Strongest: 7.2 M_{w} China
- Total fatalities: 0

Number by magnitude
- 8.0–8.9: 0
- 7.0–7.9: 1
- 6.0–6.9: 10

Date	Country and location	M_{w}	Depth (km)	MMI	Notes	Casualties	
Date	Country and location	M_{w}	Depth (km)	MMI	Notes	Dead	Injured
3	Honduras, Copan Department	6.2	35.0		Some damage was reported.		
4	Chile, Tarapaca Region	6.5	35.0		At least 51 people were hurt and many homes were destroyed.		51+
12	Fiji, south of	6.5	600.0				
15	Tibet, Tibet (1912-1951)	7.2	15.0				
15	Fiji, south of	6.9	540.0				
16	Chile, Antofagasta Region	6.0	150.0				
17	New Guinea, Admiralty Islands	6.4	15.0				
22	Nicaragua, off the west coast	6.5	25.0				
23	Bolivia, Potosi Department	6.5	100.0				
30	Mexico, Baja California	6.3	6.0	rowspan="2"| This was an example of a doublet earthquake.			
31	Mexico, Baja California	6.9	10.0	X			
