= Abdul the Bulbul-Ameer =

1941 film by Hugh Harman

- Title card
- Directed by: Hugh Harman
- Produced by: Hugh Harman; Fred Quimby (uncredited)
- Music by: Scott Bradley (uncredited)
- Color process: Technicolor
- Production company: Metro-Goldwyn-Mayer
- Distributed by: Loew's, Inc.
- Release date: January 22, 1941
- Running time: 8 min
- Country: United States
- Language: English

Abdul the Bulbul-Ameer is a 1941 American animated short film directed by Hugh Harman. It is a film adaptation and parody of the song "Abdul Abulbul Amir".

== Plot ==
Abdul picks on Ivan's dwarf friend after Ivan and his friend insult Abdul. This provokes Ivan into treading on the Turk's toe. A swordfight ensues that evolves into a highly publicized boxing match, with a running gag involving caricatures of Groucho Marx, Lou Costello and Al Ritz as news reporters who join the fight. The fight ends with both fighters landing in the water and freezing to death.
