= Barry Goudreau =

American guitarist (born 1951)

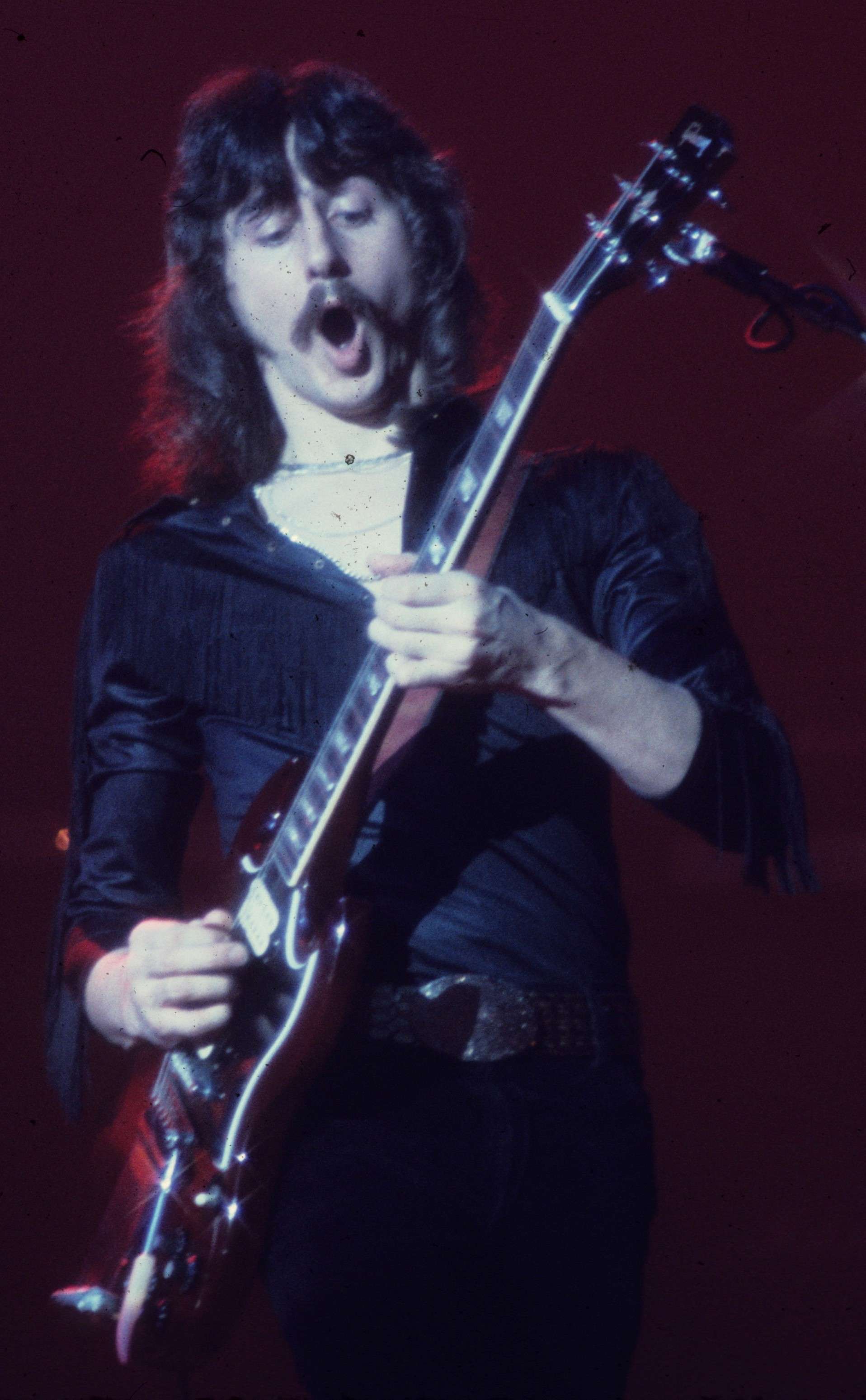
- Goudreau performing c. 1970s

Background information
- Born: November 29, 1951 (age 74); Boston, Massachusetts, U.S.
- Genres: Hard rock; arena rock; blues rock
- Occupation: Guitarist
- Years active: 1969–present
- Website: barrygoudreau.com

Barry Goudreau (born November 29, 1951) is an American guitarist. He was an original member of the rock band Boston alongside founders Brad Delp and Tom Scholz, having shared lead and rhythm guitar parts with the latter.

== Before Boston ==
Goudreau had developed a musical interest at an early age and got his first guitar, an acoustic which he borrowed from a friend, at the age of 11. He began taking lessons and by the age of 13, joined his first band, the "Tornadoes". Aged 15, he joined another band with future Boston bandmate drummer Sib Hashian. They would often play at nightclubs, sometimes seven times a week. Later, he met up with Brad Delp and Fran Sheehan, both future members of Boston. He auditioned for Delp's band, but did not make the cut.

When he went to college at Boston University, he sought to get a degree in Geology. He tried to put music aside to focus on school, but he soon met up with Tom Scholz who was attending MIT right across the river.

== With Boston ==
Goudreau worked with Tom Scholz and Brad Delp as early as 1969 on an initial set of demo tapes, where he performed all of the rhythm and lead guitar work. These early attempts to attract record label interest did not succeed.

Later, Scholz reworked and rerecorded some of these demo songs and wrote several new songs for a second set of demo tapes, this time with Scholz performing all of the guitar, bass and keyboard parts. This second demo set won a recording contract with Epic Records.

In late 1979, Scholz became involved in legal and contractual battles with the band's manager, and later with CBS. Thereafter, he informed the members of Boston that he would not be working on Boston material for at least a year and that they should feel free to do solo projects.

== After Boston ==
By this time, Goudreau had written many songs in hopes that Scholz would incorporate them into the next Boston LP. Scholz did not express interest in using any of Goudreau's work. In 1980, Goudreau recorded his first solo LP titled Barry Goudreau. He played all the instruments except the drums, played by his bandmate Sib Hashian. Brad Delp and Fran Cosmo shared the lead vocals. John Boylan, who co-produced Boston's first album, also co-produced this album, which was commercially only modestly successful. Ultimately, it was this album that triggered Scholz at some point to ask Goudreau to leave Boston, due in part to labeling added to the outside of the record sleeve that claimed the "Boston Sound" which annoyed Scholz. For several years however, Goudreau was still officially listed as a band member.

In late 1981, Boston announced that they were working on a third album, but Third Stage did not appear until 1986, and Goudreau's contributions (if any) to the protracted recording sessions were not credited. Along the way, in 1983, Goudreau and the other four members of the classic lineup were sued by CBS for not completing the album in a timely manner.

In 1984, Goudreau formed the band Orion The Hunter and released a debut LP. This time, Fran Cosmo appeared as lead vocalist, while Delp provided backing vocals and co-wrote five of the album's songs. The album included the single "So You Ran". The band then added keyboardist and backing vocalist Brian Maes and toured in support of Aerosmith in 1984 but ultimately broke up in 1985.

In 1990, Goudreau formed the band RTZ (Return to Zero). Delp left Boston to join the band. RTZ experienced some success with the hits "Face the Music" written by Goudreau and Maes and "Until Your Love Comes Back Around" written by Maes. Delp and Goudreau felt that the record company was not supporting the band to the best of their abilities, and asked to be released from their contract. They later signed with MTM Records; however, Delp departed shortly after to rejoin Boston.

In 1997, Goudreau appeared with the Lisa Guyer Band on the album Gypsy Girl and in 2000 on the album Leap of Faith. In 1998, RTZ regrouped to release their second album Lost with less success than the debut. In 2003, Goudreau and Delp teamed up for their independent recording of Delp and Goudreau. The single "It's What You Leave Behind" received limited radio airplay.

In 2005, Goudreau and the members of RTZ released two CDs of songs that were earmarked for the never-realized third RTZ album. The albums were released in the US on Briola Records as Lost in America and Found in America. Goudreau continued to perform with Sheehan in small, local venues in the greater Boston area. He also played occasionally with Delp and Hashian until their deaths in 2007 and 2017, respectively.

On October 16, 2007, Goudreau released one final song with Delp on vocals titled "Rockin' Away". According to Goudreau, ""Rockin' Away' was written in the summer of 2006 for the 30th Anniversary of the release of the first Boston record. It was the last song that Brad and I wrote together. In it, Brad reflects on how he became involved in music, and thanks his many fans for their years of loyalty. It was my hope that the song might lead to a rekindling of my relationship with the band. Unfortunately it did not". The song was a minor hit in early 2008, charting up to No. 18 on the America's Music ranking of rock radio airplay.

Goudreau was a member of Ernie and the Automatics with Sib Hashian, Tim Archibald, Brian Maes, Michael Antunes and "car guy" Ernie Boch, Jr. Their debut album, Low Expectations, was released on February 17, 2009. Ernie and the Automatics disbanded in 2011.

After Delp's death, the remaining RTZ members reunited to record "Set The Songbird Free", which was written by Brian Maes. "We wanted this to be a tribute to the love and respect that we all share for our bandmate and friend Brad," recalled Maes. On February 25, 2012, Goudreau played a three-hour set with Sheehan and others in the "All Star Jam" to benefit the Sydney and Berne Davis Art Center in Ft Myers, Florida.

Goudreau formed Barry Goudreau's Engine Room with Brian Maes, Tim Archibald, Tony DePietro, Mary Beth Maes, Joanie Cicatelli and Terri O'Soro. They released their first CD Full Steam Ahead in September 2017. Since 2014, Goudreau has also toured with the American Vinyl All Star Band, which also includes Jeff "Skunk" Baxter. Goudreau also occasionally appears with Scrap Metal, a supergroup formed by Gunner and Matthew Nelson, twin sons of Ricky Nelson.

On March 19, 2021, Goudreau released the second album from Barry Goudreau's Engine Room entitled The Road. On September 3, 2022, Goudreau was inducted into the New England Music Hall of Fame while on stage at the Hampton Beach Casino Ballroom. Goudreau now lives with his wife Connie in Swampscott, Massachusetts. They have two children: Sean, a mortgage executive, and Michele, a health and wellness coordinator. They also have three grandchildren.

== Discography ==
=== with Boston ===
- Boston (1976)
- Don't Look Back (1978)
- Greatest Hits (1997)

=== Solo ===
- Barry Goudreau (1980)

=== with Orion the Hunter ===
- Orion the Hunter (1984)

=== with RTZ ===
- Return to Zero (1991)
- Lost (1998)
- Lost and Found (2004)
- "Set The Songbird Free ..." (single) (2007)

=== with Brad Delp ===
- Delp and Goudreau (2003)
- "Rockin' Away" (single) (2007)

=== with Ernie and the Automatics ===
- Live at The Real Blues Festival (2006)
- Low Expectations (2009)

=== with Barry Goudreau's Engine Room ===
- Full Steam Ahead (2017)
- The Road (2021)
