= Ernie and the Automatics =

American blues band (2004–2011)

- Origin: Boston, Massachusetts, United States
- Genre: Blues rock
- Years active: 2004–2011
- Label: Open E
- Members: Ernie Boch Jr. Barry Goudreau; Sib Hashian; Tim Archibald; Brian Maes; Michael "Tunes" Antunes

Ernie and the Automatics were an American blues rock band based in Boston. Guitarist Barry Goudreau and drummer Sib Hashian are both former members of Boston.

Brian Maes (keyboards and lead vocals) and Tim Archibald (bass) are both former members of RTZ and are alumni of the Berklee College of Music. On saxophone is Michael "Tunes" Antunes, a member of John Cafferty & The Beaver Brown Band who appeared in the movie Eddie and the Cruisers. Ernie Boch Jr. (guitar) is a graduate of Berklee.

Ernie and the Automatics' debut album, Low Expectations, produced by Brian Maes (mixed by Bob St. John and mastered by Bob Ludwig), was released by Open E Records in February 2009. The album debuted at No. 7 on Billboard's Blues Albums chart and stayed for six weeks.

In August 2009, the band appeared on 'On Stage with Mantis' in support of Low Expectations.

== Other sources ==
- We Hear: Sinbad, Jada, Ernie and the Automatics & more…
- Ernie and the Automatics - thirdstage.ca
- Low Expectations - Ernie and the Automatics | ... | AllMusic
- The Subtle Art of Being Ernie Boch Jr.
- Ernie and the Automatics to headline CHD fundraiser
- Outside the Box - Ernie Boch Jr.
- Ernie and the Automatics to play at Bull Moose
