= COMSA (disambiguation) =

COMSA was a Spanish railway infrastructure and construction company.

COMSA or Comsa may also refer to:

- Canadian Osteopathic Medical Student Association
- Dimitrie Comșa (1846-1931), Transylvanian Romanian agronomer and activist
- Grigorie Comșa (1889–1935), a bishop in the Romanian Orthodox Church
- The "College of Maritime and Shipping Administration" at the Palompon Institute of Technology in the Philippines

== See also ==
- CONSA, Colegio Nuestra Señora de la Altagracia
- Cosma (disambiguation)
- Komsa (disambiguation)
