= Gornergrat Kulm Hotel =

Hotel and observatory in Switzerland

Coordinates: 45°59′00″N 7°47′01″E

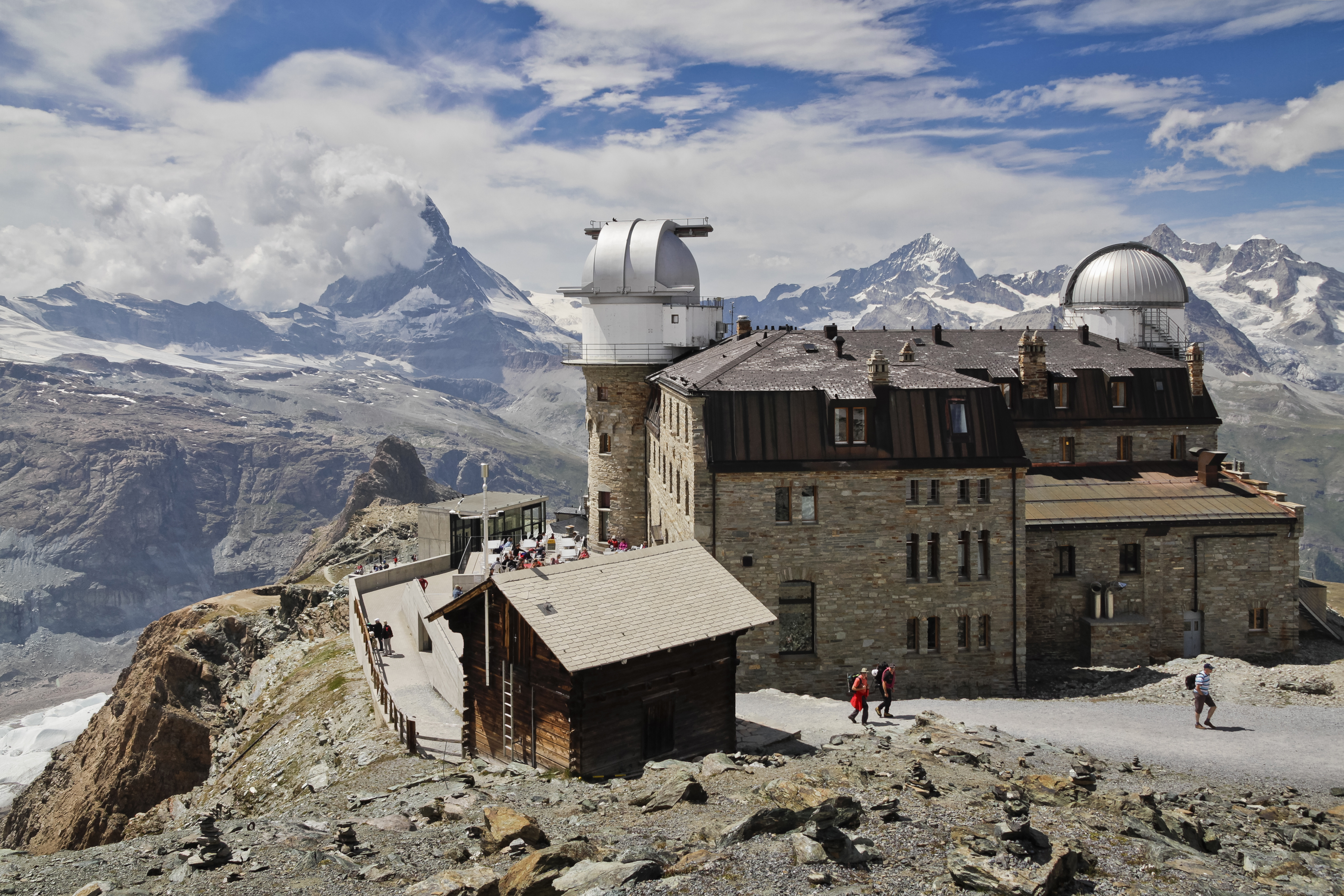

The Gornergrat Kulm Hotel is a hotel and observatory located on the Gornergrat in Switzerland, at 3,120 metres above sea level. It can be reached from Zermatt via the Gornergrat railway, the terminus station being located 100 metres away. The hotel includes an observatory, two restaurants and a small shopping mall.

A first hotel was built on the Gornergrat in 1896, two years before the completion of the Gornergrat rack railway. As the tourist traffic increased, the current larger hotel was built between 1897 and 1907. Given the clean air and good light conditions of the area, a dome was built on each of the two towers of the hotel in 1996. The KOSMA telescope was installed in the southern tower while the Gornergrat Infrared Telescope was installed in the northern tower.

== See also ==
- List of buildings and structures above 3000 m in Switzerland
