= Ernie Boch Jr. =

American businessman (born 1958)

- Born: Ernest Alexander Boch Jr. February 15, 1958 (age 68)
- Occupations: Chairman and CEO of Boch enterprises CEO of Subaru of New England
- Known for: Automobile sales, philanthropy, Ernie and the Automatics

Ernest Alexander Boch Jr. (born February 15, 1958) is an American billionaire and businessman who is the former CEO of Boch Enterprises, a US$1 billion business consisting primarily of automobile dealerships in Norwood, Massachusetts and the current CEO of Subaru of New England.

Boch is a local celebrity in the Greater Boston area who has a passion for music, makes television cameos, and has a creative approach to advertising and selling cars.

== Early life and education ==
Ernie Jr.'s first car was a 1971 Volkswagen Beetle, British racing green. He bought it in 1974, when he was 16, from the used-car department at his family's Toyota dealership.

He graduated from Berklee College of Music in Boston.

== Career ==
Ernie Boch Jr. inherited the automobile sales and service business started by his grandfather, Andrew Boch, who began the family business in 1945 by purchasing a Nash Motors franchise in Norwood, Massachusetts.

After leaving Berklee, he went on the road with several bands. Eventually he returned to Norwood to work at one of his father's dealerships. "And I just got hooked," he later said. Though he sold cars by day, by night he socialized with Boston celebrities and well known musicians. His lifestyle got his name in the newspapers and led to tensions between himself and his father, who "fired him from dealership jobs at least twice." He inherited the business in 2003 following the death of his father. Shortly after the death of Ernie Boch Sr., Boch Jr. appeared in a television commercial paying tribute to his father. Boch Jr. was in a car, watching images from an old commercial featuring his father, in the rear view mirror. Boch Jr. smiled and drove away.

In October 2015, Boch Jr. sold the majority of his dealerships, although they retained the Boch name and he continued to be the public face of the dealerships. He retained ownership of his Ferrari and Maserati dealership, and remained CEO of Subaru of New England.

== Philanthropy ==
Boch founded in 2005 "Music Drives Us", a regional project supporting music in New England. Its three focuses are music preservation, music education, and music awareness. It places instruments in and pays for music programs in about 200 public schools in Boston and around New England. "I've funded Boston public schools that had music programs without instruments, music programs literally in basements next to the water heater," he said in 2017. Music "should be...standard stuff in schools, just like math."

In 2005, Boch joined Berklee's board of trustees. He has since led several major fundraising campaigns for Berklee.

On the invitation of National Geographic, Boch filmed a reality show in which he provided infrastructure and other resources for an impoverished Ugandan village.

In 2016 he agreed to underwrite the organization that runs the Shubert and Wang theaters in Boston, which are now collectively known as the Boch Center.

In January 2021 he made an unsolicited one-million dollar donation to the Barstool Fund, in support of their effort in helping small businesses through the coronavirus pandemic.

== Other ventures ==
Boch has formed a band, Ernie and the Automatics. Ernie and the Automatics album Low Expectations was on Billboard's Top Blues Album chart for six weeks, debuting at #7. The band has opened for Deep Purple. He formerly sat on the Berklee College of Music's Board of Trustees.

Boch appeared on the TV show, The Phantom Gourmet. On September 8, 2007, he was a guest judge for the cleavage contest at King Richard's Faire, along with drummer Sib Hashian. He appeared on WLVI-TV's Creature Double Feature playing "The Ghoul".

Boch has appeared in three episodes of the television show Rescue Me, "Black," "Animal" and "Satisfaction" as Captain Bernard, the coach of the NYPD hockey team.

Boch also owned the Boston-based women's tackle football team, the Boston Militia.

== Personal life ==
His current residence began as a mansion that he bought in 1997 on a one-acre plot in Norwood. Over the next twenty years he bought up and tore down the homes of 17 neighbors and expanded his house into a 30,000-square-foot (2,800 m^{2}) compound. "Back in Europe, they used to build houses that would last generations," he explained. "Here, they build houses that are almost disposable. It's disgusting!" He owns rare sports cars, collects guitars, a private jet, and a custom stretch limo. In 2022, Ernie was granted permission by the Norwood Town Meeting to erect a mausoleum on the property.

Ernie also owns a home in Edgartown, MA on the island of Martha's Vineyard where he spends time in the summer.

On November the 6th, 2026, Boch announced on the NBC10 show 'Just Curious with JC' that he was engaged and getting married to British Music Host, Kylie Olsson.

=== Political views ===
Boch, who had been a friend and supporter of Mitt Romney during his presidential campaign, supported Donald Trump in 2016. In the summer of 2015, he contacted Corey Lewandowski to look into throwing a fundraiser. "Lewandowski told him he didn't know, since no one had thrown one yet." So Boch met Trump at Trump Tower to discuss it. "I went up to his office. And he wasn't president. But you could feel, like if I was going to go in there and negotiate with him about something, he would have killed me." Boch held the fundraiser at his home in August 2015, charging $100 per person. He later told Boston Magazine that he "had been a fan" of Trump's "since the '80s." He explained: "If you were a business guy, Trump had character.... He was a showman, a promoter." He has also said that he supported Donald Trump's presidential candidacy because Trump knows how to run a business, spends money efficiently, and is transparent.

Appearing on CNN, he compared his support for Trump to selecting which inebriated girl to take home at closing time. "It's 2 a.m. and there's a few girls at the bar," he said. "You have to go home with one of them." Later in the conversation, the billionaire said that he had talked his way out of a ticket by telling a police officer he supported Trump.
