= Park Valley, Utah =

Unincorporated community in the state of Utah, United States

- Unincorporated community
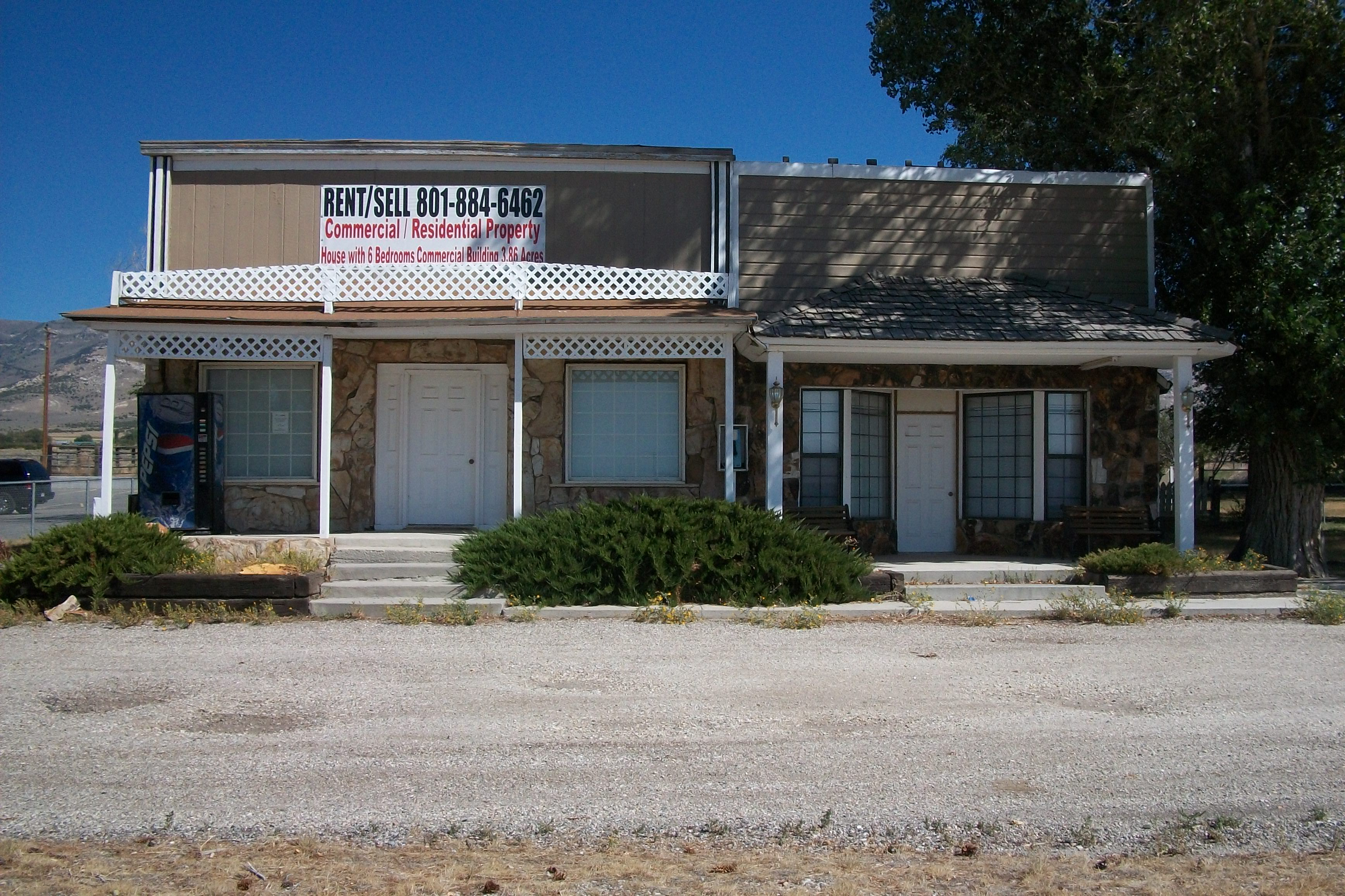
- Buildings in Park Valley, August 2012

- Location of Park Valley within the State of Utah
- Coordinates: 41°49′03″N 113°19′45″W
- Country: United States
- State: Utah
- County: Box Elder
- Settled: 1869
- Founder: William P. Thomas
- Elevation: 5,548 ft (1,691 m)
- Time zone: UTC-7 (Mountain (MST))
  - Summer (DST): UTC-6 (MDT)
- ZIP code: 84329
- Area code: 435
- GNIS feature ID: 1431110

Park Valley is an unincorporated community in north-central Box Elder County, Utah, United States.

== Description ==
The community lies in the northwestern part of the state, 150 miles (240 km) northwest of the state capital at Salt Lake City, and 100 miles (160 km) west of the county seat at Brigham City. Utah State Route 30 runs through the center of the valley, generally from east to west. The valley is a roughly oval shape of about 30 miles (48 km) in length east to west and about 25 miles (40 km) north to south, covering a major portion of the western end of the county.

Park Valley anchors the northern end of the Great Basin. The Raft River Mountains to the north mark the boundary between the Great Basin and the Snake River Plain. What is called the community of Park Valley includes name locations that used to be nearly separate communities, such as Rosette, Dove Creek, Muddy, Rosebud, and Kelton, as well as ones that have been almost forgotten by time, such as Ten-Mile, Clear Creek, Rosen Valley, Terrace, Golden, Matlin, and other lesser camps along the old railroad grade. Since all of these areas belong to a homogeneous community, they are all known collectively as Park Valley. The valley center, or Park Valley proper, is the community center, which contains the church house, store, hotel, the park, and the schoolhouse.

Historical population
Census	Pop.	Note	%±
1870	70		—
1880	275		292.9%
1890	196		−28.7%
1900	279		42.3%
1910	260		−6.8%
1920	173		−33.5%
1930	167		−3.5%
1940	140		−16.2%
1950	142		1.4%
Source: U.S. Census Bureau

== History ==
In 1826, explorer Jedediah Smith passed through the area. In 1841, the Bartleson-Bidwell Party brought the first wagons through the valley.

While the Transcontinental Railroad coming to Utah did not pass directly through the valley, its proximity played an important part in the settlement and development of the area. Settlement was apparently a result of surveys conducted for several miles on either side of the railroad right-of-way. Even before the rails were joined at Promontory on May 10, 1869, the effect of the railroad on Park Valley had begun. The first permanent settler was William P. (Cotton) Thomas, who migrated from Brigham City in 1869, and developed a cattle ranch near Dove Creek. The heavy growth of trees along the creek and the view of the valley inspired the name.

The town experienced a minor boom in 1890 when gold was discovered.

== Climate ==
According to the Köppen Climate Classification system, Park Valley has a semi-arid climate, abbreviated "BSk" on climate maps.
