= Abdul Abulbul Amir =

1877 music-hall song by Percy French

"Abdul Abulbul Amir" is the most common name for a music hall song written in 1877 (during the Russo-Turkish War) under the title "Abdulla Bulbul Ameer" by Irish songwriter Percy French, and subsequently altered and popularized by a variety of other writers and performers. It tells the story of two valiant heroes—the titular Abdulla, fighting for the Turks, and his foe, Ivan Skavinsky Skavar (originally named Ivan Potschjinsky Skidar in French's version), a Russian warrior—who encounter each other, engage in verbal boasting, and are drawn into a duel in which both perish. The song was adapted by Metro-Goldwyn-Mayer into the 1941 cartoon Abdul the Bulbul-Ameer.

Percy French wrote the song in 1877 for a smoking concert while studying at Trinity College Dublin. It was likely a comic opera spoof. "Pot Skivers" were the chambermaids at the college, thus Ivan "Potschjinski" Skivar would be a less than noble prince, and as Bulbul is an Arabic dialectic name of the nightingale, Abdul was thus a foppish "nightingale" amir (prince).

== Variant names ==
The names of the principal characters have been transcribed in a variety of ways in different versions of the lyrics. The title character's last name appears as both "Ameer" and "Amir", and the syllable break between his first and middle names varies from version to version (originally "Abdulla Bulbul", as seen below, but often rendered as "Abdul Abulbul").

His Russian opponent's name has been more drastically modified over time. First given as "Ivan Potschjinski Skidar", the character is perhaps best known today as "Ivan Skavinsky Skivar", with considerable variation in the spelling of both the middle and last names.

== Lyrics ==
A great many versions of the lyrics exist, with the names of the principal characters spelled in a variety of ways. The version presented by French's biographer James N. Healy appears to be the most authoritative available text. According to Healy, French sold his rights in the song for five pounds while failing to register his copyright to it, and subsequently discovered that a London publisher had produced an altered and unauthorized version which failed to identify French as the author.

== Explicit parody ==
An obscene parody version of the song, in which Abdul and Ivan engage in a competition regarding who can have sex with more prostitutes in a given time, originated in the British military and is traditionally sung in rugby clubs.

== Use in other media ==
In the October 8th, 1990 episode of Star Trek: The Next Generation entitled "Brothers", the villainous android Lore sings a portion of Abdul Abulbul Amir as part of his getaway speech.

== Commercials ==
In the 1980s, Whitbread brewery adapted the song using their own lyrics for a series of commercials on British television, suggesting that the two protagonists were great fans of their Whitbread Best beer who squabbled over trivialities such as what type of glassware to drink it from, because they had forgotten that "the best Best needs no etiquette". The commercials starred Stephen Fry as Ivan, Tony Cosmo as Abdul, Tim McInnerny and Roy Castle, and were directed by Paul Weiland.

A variant of the poem appeared in an ad for Springmaid cotton sheets in Life magazine, 7 January 1952.
