= Tony Cosmo =

American actor

Tony Cosmo (born c. 1940) is an actor and rock musician who starred in a series of musical commercials for Whitbread Best Bitter Beer based on Percy French's music hall song Abdul Abulbul Amir. He also played a role as a sheriff in Reservoir Dogs.

== Career ==
Cosmo's career began in the 1960s, when he fronted a rock and roll band signed with an American label called Fling Records. The group recorded two singles: "Wise To You", and "Ponytail Annie". Other original compositions included "Teenager For President", "Give Me Some", "The Big Party", and "Tiny Hands".

During the 1980s, Cosmo was based in the UK and starred in a series of musical commercials for Whitbread Best Bitter Beer alongside Roy Castle and Blackadder star Tim McInnerny. Cosmo played the Russo-Turkish War-era Mameluke Abdul Abulbul Amir who was constantly outwitting the foppish Russian Count portrayed by comedian Stephen Fry. The latter described Cosmo as a "menacing, swarthy character" in his autobiography.

In 1992, Cosmo was cast as a sheriff in Quentin Tarantino's cult film Reservoir Dogs.
