= Cosmo (book) =

Canadian book of short stories

- Author: Spencer Gordon
- Language: English
- Genre: Short story collection
- Publisher: Coach House Books
- Publication date: October 2012
- Publication place: Canada
- Pages: 212
- ISBN: 978-1-55245-267-7

Cosmo is a 2012 short story collection published by Coach House Books. It is the debut book and short story collection of Canadian writer Spencer Gordon. The book features stories involving themes of celebrity, pop culture, and contemporary identity.

== Reception ==
CBC Books awarded Cosmo "The Overlookie Bookie Award for Most Underrated Canadian Book." Writing for Dazed Magazine, author Lauren Oyler included Cosmo in the article, "Ten of the best alt-lit reads from Canada right now." The publication 49th Shelf listed Cosmo as one of "Most Anticipated Books of Fall 2012."

Cosmo received mostly positive reviews from publications, such as Quill & Quire (which gave Cosmo a starred review), the National Post, HTML Giant, the Winnipeg Free Press,The Walrus, The Winnipeg Review, Scene Magazine, and Lemon Hound.

== See also ==
- Cruise Missile Liberals by Spencer Gordon
- A Horse at the Window by Spencer Gordon
