= Santi Cosma e Damiano =

Santi Cosma e Damiano may refer to:

== Churches ==
- Santi Cosma e Damiano, Alcamo, church in Alcamo, Italy
- Santi Cosma e Damiano, Brescia, church in Brescia, Italy
- Santi Cosma e Damiano, Genoa, church in Genoa, Italy
- Santi Cosma e Damiano, Isernia, church in Isernia, Italy
- Santi Cosma e Damiano, Persico, church in Persico, Italy
- Santi Cosma e Damiano, Rome, church in Rome, Italy, titular church of a cardinal deacon
- Santi Cosma e Damiano a Porta Nolana, church in Naples, Italy
- Santi Cosma e Damiano ai Banchi Nuovi, church in Naples, Italy

== Places ==
- Santi Cosma e Damiano, Lazio, town and comune in the province of Latina, in the Lazio region of central Italy
