= Cosmo Graham =

Cosmo Graham is a British legal scholar. He was a professor in the Faculty of Law at the University of Leicester between 1999 and 2021. He specialised in the field of law relating to the regulation of public utilities and is co-editor of the Utilities Law Review. He also specialised in competition law and taught constitutional law and company law.

Professor Graham was a member of the UK's Competition Commission (1999–2008). He is Co-Editor of Utilities Law Review.
