= Kosmopoliet =

Dutch clipper

History

Netherlands
- Name: Kosmopoliet
- Owner: Gebr. Blussé (Dordrecht)
- Builder: Cornelis Gips and Sons, Dordrecht, The Netherlands
- Launched: Nov. 29, 1854

General characteristics
- Class & type: Dutch clipper
- Tons burthen: 800 tons
- Sail plan: Full-rigged ship

Netherlands
- Name: Kosmopoliet II
- Launched: 1865

General characteristics
- Tons burthen: 1200 tons

Netherlands
- Name: Kosmopoliet III
- Launched: 1871

General characteristics
- Tons burthen: 1548 tons

Kosmopoliet I (800 tons) is said to have been one of the first Dutch clippers.

== Kosmopoliet I ==
She was launched on 29 November 1854 by the shipyard of Cornelis Gips and Sons in Dordrecht, The Netherlands, for the account of the shipping company of Gebr. Blussé (Dordrecht), inspired by a model of a medium-clipper presented in 1852 at an exhibition in Amsterdam by the Dutch lieutenant-commander M.H. Jansen.

The Kosmopoliet carried both cargo and passengers. She was full-rigged and carried royals and skysails on all three masts.

Though a voyage from the Netherlands to Java (port to port) normally took a 100 days or more, the Kosmopoliet completed her maiden voyage in 89 days. Later she did the passage in 76, 74 and 77 days.

== Kosmopoliet II and Kosmopoliet III ==
In 1865 the Kosmopoliet II (1200 tons) was launched, followed by Kosmopoliet III in 1871, which measured 1548 tons.
