= Cosmo D'Angeli =

Italian painter

- Born: Cosmo D'Angeli; 29 October 1889; Rome, Italy
- Died: 28 November 1968 (aged 79); Rome, Italy
- Education: Accademia di Belle Arti di Roma
- Known for: painting, sculpture
- Movement: Macchiaioli
- Awards: La Tavoletta D'oro

Cosmo D'Angeli (29 October 1889 – 28 November 1968) was an Italian painter and sculptor.

== Life and works ==
Cosmo D'Angeli was born on 29 October 1889 in Rome, Italy. His family owned a bakery near Termini Station. After graduating from the Accademia di Belle Arti di Roma, he began showing his paintings and sculptures on the Via del Babuino, Via Milano, Via Veneto, Via Margutta, and in galleries in Rome. He won various prizes, including the "La Tavoletta D'oro".

His style, at first Impressionist, changed in time to reflect the art and technique of the Macchiaioli. He was also devoted to sculpture and worked as architect in the zone of Rome and Anzio Colonia.

Many of his paintings are in collections outside of Italy: France, Germany, England, Belgium and the United States. His work has also been listed in the catalogs of international art action houses.

D'Angeli died of cancer in Rome on 28 November 1968, leaving his wife Adelaide and his daughter Anna.

== Bibliography ==
- Magazine "Scena Illustrata", 1965, Roma
