= Kuzmanov =

Kuzmanov (Bulgarian Cyrillic: Кузманов) is a Bulgarian surname. Notable people with the surname include:

- Anton Kuzmanov (1918–?), Bulgarian football player
- Dimitar Kuzmanov (born 1993), Bulgarian tennis player
