= Cosmo =

Cosmo may refer to:

== Business and media ==
- Cosmopolitan (magazine), a magazine for women, sometimes referred to as "Cosmo"
- Cosmo (book), 2012 short story collection
- Cosmo On-Line, a Brazilian generic Internet portal
- COSMO (German radio station), a public radio station
- Cosmo TV, alternate name of the cable and satellite television network Cosmopolitan Television
- Cosmo Oil Company (established 1986), Japanese petrochemical company
- Cosmo (restaurant), a chain of buffet restaurants in the United Kingdom
- Mazda Cosmo, any of several cars of this name
- Xda Cosmo, commercial name of the HTC Excalibur smartphone model
- Anki Cozmo, a miniature robot toy released in October 2016
- Planet Cosmo, a British-Irish children's series about space

== Music ==
- Cosmo, a band formed by Fran Cosmo and his son Anton Cosmo in 2006
- Doug Clifford (born 1945), American rock drummer and member of the rock band Creedence Clearwater Revival, nicknamed "Cosmo"
- Cosmo Jarvis, stage name of English singer-songwriter and filmmaker Harrison Cosmo Krikoryan Jarvis
- Cosmo (Doug Clifford album), 1972
- Cosmo (Ozuna album), 2023
- "Cosmo" (song), 2014 single by Comoros / French rapper Soprano
- "Cosmo", 2019 single by South Korean band Pentagon
- Cosmó (born 2006), Hungarian-Austrian singer

== People and fictional characters ==
- Cosmo (name), a list of people and fictional characters with either the given name or surname
- Colleen 'Cosmo' Murphy (born 1968), club disc jockey and music entrepreneur

== Places ==
- Cosmo Township, Kearney County, Nebraska
- Cosmo Park, a recreation area in Columbia, Missouri

== Other uses ==
- Cosmos (plant), a wildflower of the family Asteraceae
- Cosmo (parrot), a parrot known for its cognitive abilities
- Cosmo (dog), dog which starred in Hotel for Dogs
- Cosmopolitan (cocktail), informally called a cosmo
- COSMO solvation model, calculation method for determining the electrostatic interaction of a molecule with a solvent
- Cosmo the Cougar, mascot of Brigham Young University
- WTC Cosmo Tower, a skyscraper in Osaka, Kansai, Japan
- New York Cosmos, a defunct soccer team

== See also ==
- Cosimo (disambiguation)
- Cosmas (disambiguation), includes Kosmas
- Cosmopolitan (disambiguation)
- Cosmos (disambiguation)
