= Return to Zero (RTZ album) =

Studio album by RTZ
- Released: 1991
- Recorded: 1991
- Genre: Rock
- Length: 48:28
- Label: Warner Bros.
- Producer: Chris Lord-Alge

RTZ chronology
Return to Zero (1991)	Lost (1998)

Return to Zero is the debut album by the American rock band RTZ, released in 1991 by Warner Bros. Records. The first single was "Face the Music".

== Critical reception ==
Professional ratings
Review scores
Source	Rating
AllMusic	3/5 stars
Calgary Herald	C

The Calgary Herald opined: "Missing is any hint of power in RTZ's rock, or even foot-tapping, finger-snapping rock. Just lots of boring shooting for Top 40 appeal."

== Track listing ==
All songs written by Delp and Goudreau, except where noted.

1. "Face the Music" (Goudreau, Maes) - 4:01
2. "There's Another Side" - 4:11
3. "All You've Got" - 4:02
4. "This Is My Life" - 5:33
5. "Rain Down on Me" (Goudreau, John Warren, Maes, Stefanelli, Archibald) - 4:15
6. "Every Door Is Open" - 4:27
7. "Devil to Pay" - 4:30
8. "Until Your Love Comes Back Around" (Maes) - 5:56
9. "Livin' for the Rock 'n' Roll" - 3:27
10. "Hard Time (In the Big House)" - 4:06
11. "Return to Zero" (Delp, Goudreau, Maes) - 3:25

== Singles ==
- "Face the Music"
- "All You've Got"
- "Until Your Love Comes Back Around"

== Personnel ==
Band members

- Brad Delp – lead and background vocals
- Barry Goudreau – guitar, background vocals
- Brian Maes – keyboards, harmonica, tambourine, background vocals
- Tim Archibald – bass
- David Stefanelli – drums, background vocals

Guest musicians

- Bob Gay – sax solo on Track 9
- Maxine Waters – background vocals on Track 7
- Julia Waters – background vocals on Track 7

Horns on track 7

- Jerry Hey – trumpet
- Jay Cable – trumpet
- Bill Reichenbach Jr. – trombone
- Dan Higgins – sax
- Bill Liston – sax

Producing and recording

- Produced, recorded and mixed by Chris Lord-Alge
- Recorded at Studios Image Recording (Hollywood, California), Rumbo Recorders (Canoga Park, California), Village Recorders (Santa Monica, California), Blue Jay (Carlisle, MA)
- Assistant engineers: Talley Sherwood, Jason Roberts, Rob Hart, Andy Udoff, Mark Tanzer
- Mastered By Bob Ludwig
