= Cosmas (disambiguation) =

Cosmas or Kosmas is a Greek given name. Cosmas or Kosmas may also refer to:

== Place names ==
- Agios Kosmas Olympic Sailing Centre, a facility of the 2004 Summer Olympics at Athens, Greece
- Kosmas, Greece, a municipal unit in Arcadia, Greece
- Kosmas o Aitolos, a municipal unit in Grevena regional unit, Greece

== Church buildings ==
- Basilica Santi Cosma e Damiano, a church in Rome, Italy
- Church of Cosmas and Damian, a church in medieval Novgorod the Great
- Church of Saint Cosmas and Damian, a church on Lastovo Island, Croatia
- St Cosmas and St Damian Church, Keymer, a church in West Sussex, England

== Other uses ==
- Kosmas Air, a former Serbian cargo airline
- Kosmas - Czechoslovak and Central European Journal, multidisciplinary bi-annual journal

== See also ==
- Cosimo (disambiguation)
- Cosma (disambiguation)
- Cosmo (disambiguation)
