= Gornergrat Infrared Telescope =

Infrared telescope in Switzerland

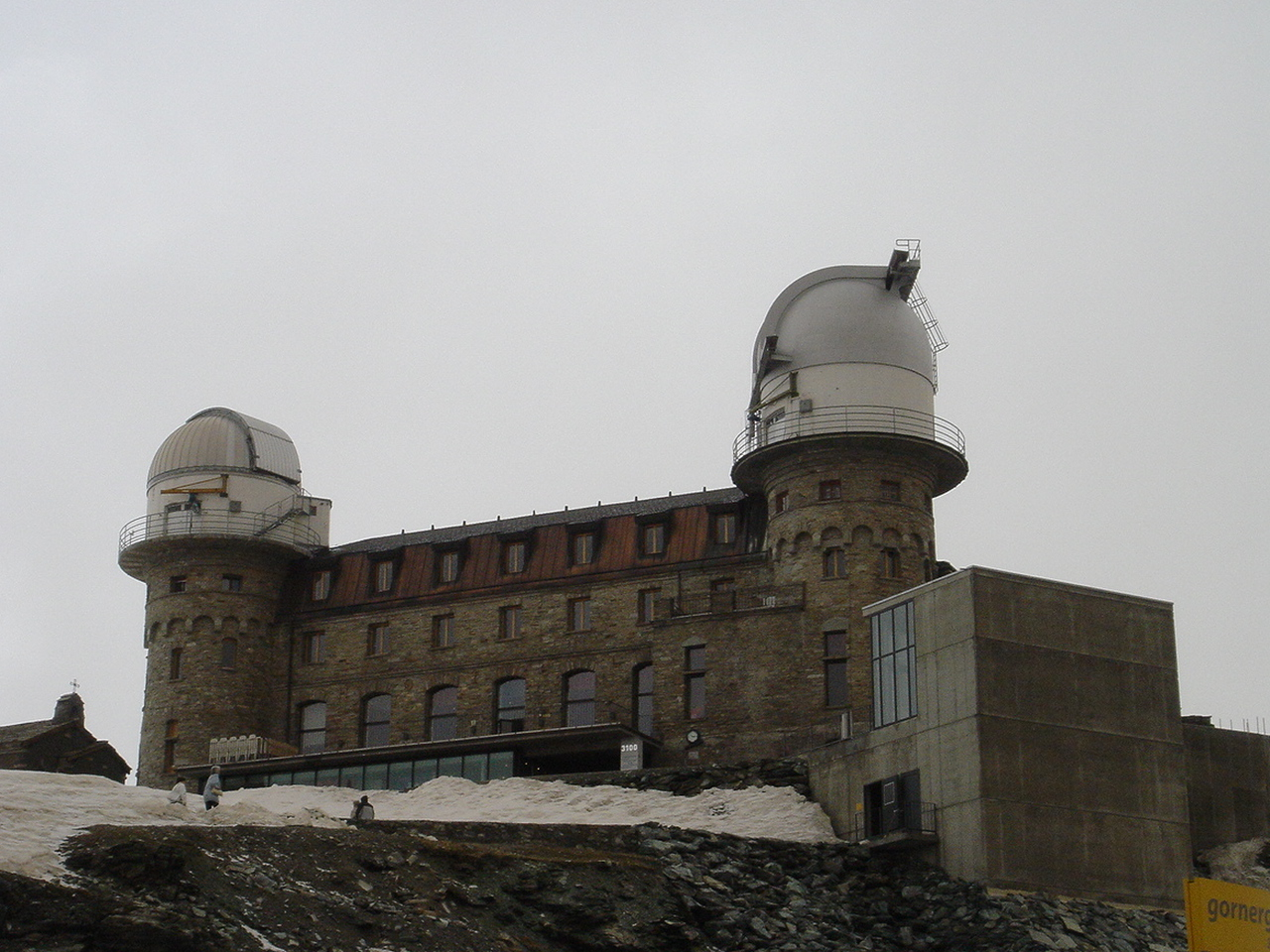
- The telescope (left) as seen in May 2008.
- Location(s): Switzerland
- Coordinates: 45°59′00″N 7°47′01″E
- Altitude: 3,135 m (10,285 ft)
- Diameter: 1.5 m (4 ft 11 in)
- Website: www.arcetri.astro.it/irlab/tirgo/
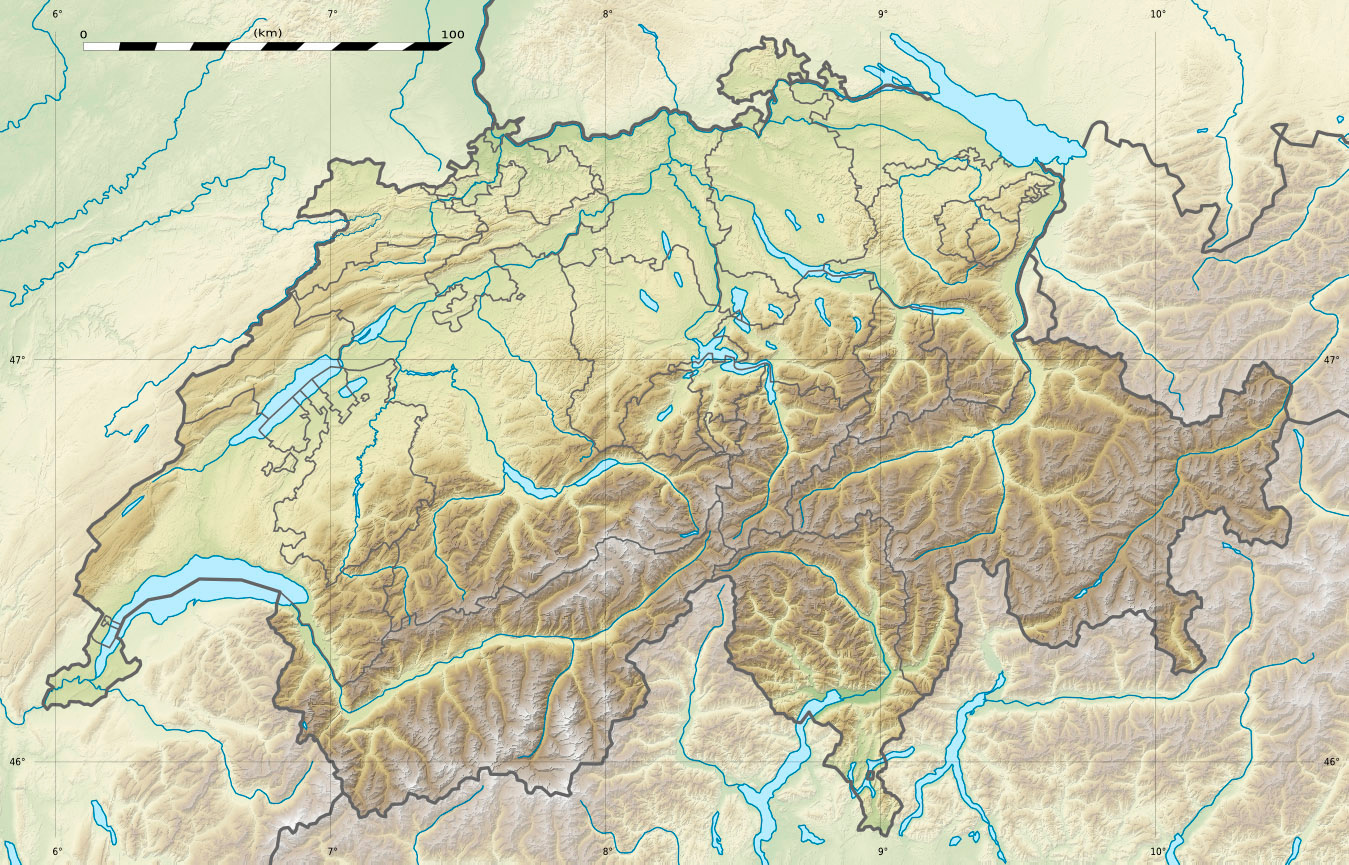
- Location of Gornergrat Infrared Telescope
- Related media on Commons

The Telescopio InfraRosso del Gornergrat (TIRGO), or the Gornergrat Infrared Telescope, was located on the northern tower of the Kulm Hotel at Gornergrat (3,135 metres (10,285 ft) altitude) near Zermatt, Switzerland. It was a 1.5-metre (4.9 ft) Cassegrain telescope with a tip-tilt correcting secondary and optimized for infrared observations, but was decommissioned in March 2005. The telescope and related instrumentation were run by the Istituto di Radioastronomia (IRA - C.N.R.), sezione di Firenze (former CAISMI), with the assistance of the Osservatorio Astrofisico di Arcetri and the Dipartimento di Astronomia e Scienza dello Spazio of the University of Florence.

== See also ==
- List of largest optical telescopes in the 20th century
- List of largest infrared telescopes
