= Kuzmanovski =

Kuzmanovski (Macedonian: Кузмановски) is a Macedonian (Eastern South Slavic) surname. It may refer to:

- Stevica Kuzmanovski (born 1962), Macedonian former footballer
- Slobodan Kuzmanovski (born 1962), Serbian-born handball player

It is related to the Serbian surname Kuzmanović.
