= KOSMA =

Observatory

Kölner Observatorium für SubMillimeter Astronomie
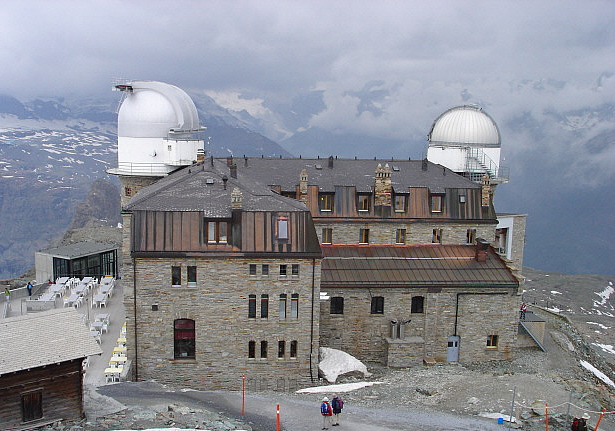
- Alternative names: KOSMA
- Location(s): Gornergrat Kulm Hotel, Gornergrat, Valais, Switzerland
- Coordinates: 45°59′04″N 7°47′09″E
- Organization: University of Bonn; University of Cologne
- Altitude: 3,135 m (10,285 ft)
- First light: 1985
- Decommissioned: 2 June 2010
- Telescope style: radio telescope
- Diameter: 3 m (9 ft 10 in)
- Secondary diameter: 0.27 m (11 in)
- Focal length: 31.2 m (102 ft 4 in)
- Website: astro.uni-koeln.de/index.php?id=17647
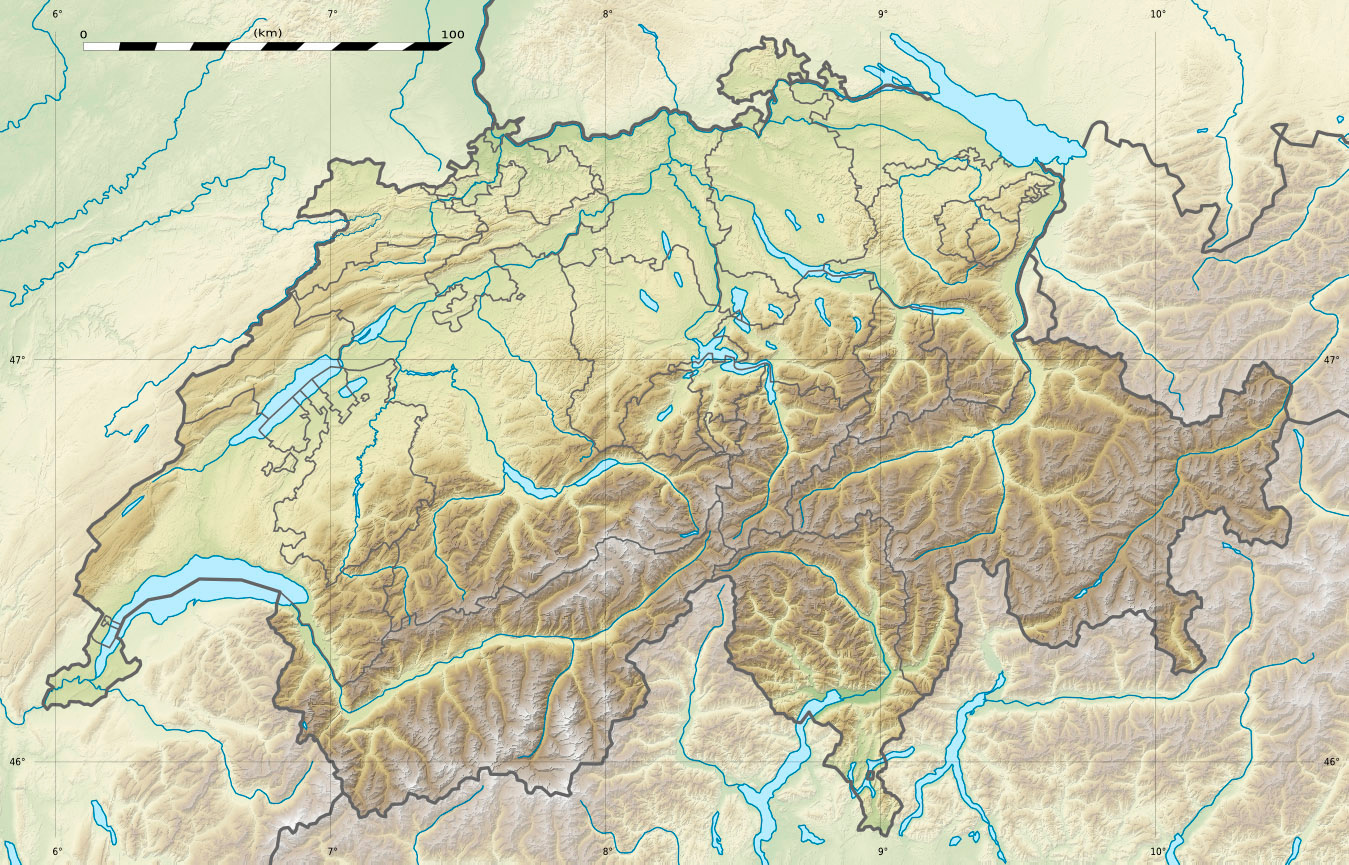
- Location of KOSMA
- Related media on Commons

The Kölner Observatorium für SubMillimeter Astronomie (KOSMA) was a radio telescope for submillimeter astronomy located at 3,135 m (10,285 ft) on Gornergrat near Zermatt (Switzerland). It was operated by I. Physikalisches Institut, University of Cologne, and Radioastronomisches Institut, University of Bonn.

The telescope had a primary diameter of 3 m (9.8 ft), and a secondary diameter of 0.27 metres (0.89 ft). It was equipped with heterodyne receivers covering 210 to 820 GHz, corresponding to wavelengths between 0.35 and 1.4 mm, for observations of lines from the interstellar medium.

Because of the good climatic conditions at the altitude of 3135 m (10285 ft), astronomical observatories have been located in both towers of the Kulmhotel at Gornergrat since 1967. In 1985, the KOSMA telescope was installed in the southern tower by the Universität zu Köln and, in the course of 1995, replaced by a new dish and mount. In the northern tower, a 1.5 m infrared telescope was operated until 2005 by an Italian association of universities (TIRGO).

In 2010, the telescope was moved to a site in Yangbajain in Damxung County in Tibet at an altitude of 4300m and renamed CCOSMA.

== See also ==
- The James Clerk Maxwell submillimeter telescope
- The California Submillimeter Observatory
- Science and technology in Switzerland
