= Kosmo, Utah =

- Ghost town
- Location within Utah Location within the United States
- Coordinates: 41.71772°N 112.79149°W
- Country: United States
- State: Utah
- County: Box Elder
- Time zone: UTC-7 (MST)
  - Summer (DST): UTC-6 (MDT)

Kosmo (also spelled Kosmos or Cosmo) is a ghost town in Box Elder County, Utah, United States. The town was built in two sections, with the east end built in 1901 to serve as a rail spur of the First transcontinental railroad for the ranchers in the area.

== Background ==
The western part of the town was constructed in 1912, about one-half mile from the east part, as a spur for potash mining. Potash had become difficult to acquire during World War I, as its major producer was Germany. The Salt Lake Potash Company was established to combat the shortages and built ponds, canals, a rail spur and processing station in West Kosmo.

In addition, three bunkhouses, a cookhouse, garage, stock corral, general store, blacksmith and coal house were constructed in the town. A 1925 Utah Gazetteer noted the town had a population of 200 people. All that remain of the town are a few concrete foundations and canals in West Kosmo.

Kosmo's post office was operational from 1919 through 1922.

The town was near the epicenter of the 1934 Hansel Valley earthquake, which damaged structures in the town.
