= Ivanka Madunić Kuzmanović =

Croatian poet and historian

- Occupations: Poet, historian

Ivanka Madunić Kuzmanović is a Croatian poet and historian. She lives and works as a history professor in Milwaukee, Wisconsin.

She attended the Split Gymnasium and studied at the University of Zagreb. In April 1973, the PGP Radio Kruševac label released her vinyl Vojvodino ravna with two singles in a duo with Dragoslava Genčić and Tambura Orchestra RTV Novi Sad.

She is a member and president of New York's branch of the HIL—an association of Croatian poets in diaspora—which publishes her collections of poems.

She is a regular participant of HIL's poem nights and meetings in Croatia and worldwide.
