= Cosimo de' Medici (disambiguation) =

Cosimo de' Medici (1389–1464) was the founder of the House of Medici.

Cosimo de' Medici may also refer to certain historical Grand Dukes of Tuscany:

- Cosimo I de' Medici, (r. 1537–1569)
- Cosimo II de' Medici, (r. 1609–1621)
- Cosimo III de' Medici, (r. 1670–1723)
