= Orion the Hunter (band) =

1983–1985 Rock band

- Genre: Hard rock
- Years active: 1983–1985
- Spinoff of: Boston
- Members: Fran Cosmo; Brad Delp; Barry Goudreau; Bruce Smith; Michael DeRosier

Orion the Hunter was a 1980s rock band formed as an offshoot of Boston that featured former Boston members Barry Goudreau and Brad Delp on guitar and backing vocals, respectively, and lead vocalist Fran Cosmo, who would later join Boston.

The band was originally known as simply "Orion", but the name was changed to "Orion the Hunter" in deference to pressure from Orion Pictures. The group's self-titled album in 1984 on Portrait/CBS Records, which yielded a hit single "So You Ran," featured the sky-high vocals which prompted Cosmo's entrance to Boston in the early 1990s.

Orion the Hunter charted at #57 on Billboard's Top 200 Albums chart after its debut on May 9, 1984. "So You Ran" reached #7 on rock radio and #58 on the Hot 100.

Orion the Hunter featured Bruce Smith on bass and drummer Michael DeRosier (formerly of Heart). The album also included Brad Delp, former lead singer of Boston, who co-wrote four songs and sang background vocals on numerous tracks. Delp's vocals are especially noticeable on the ballad "Joanne" which he co-wrote with Fran Cosmo.

== Discography ==
- Orion the Hunter (Portrait, 1984)
- "So You Ran" (single), Billboard Hot 100 peak position #58, (Portrait/Epic), July 1984
- The Lost Demos of Cosmo/Smith: demos recorded by Cosmo and Smith for the second Orion album, which was never released. Four songs were uploaded to FranCosmoMusic's YouTube channel.

== Personnel ==
=== Band ===
- Fran Cosmo: Lead vocals, guitar
- Barry Goudreau: Lead and rhythm guitars, vocals
- Bruce Smith: Bass, vocals
- Michael DeRosier: Drums

=== Additional musicians ===
- Brad Delp: Backing Vocals
- Brian Maes (touring only): Keyboards, Backing Vocals
- Steve Baker (studio only): Grand Piano
- John Schuller (studio only): Organ, Mellotron, Oberheim synthesizer
