= Cosimo Commisso (scientist) =

Canadian cell biologist and cancer researcher

Cosimo Commisso is a Canadian cell biologist and cancer researcher who has made significant advances in the field of cellular trafficking and cancer metabolism. Among his most notable contributions are the discovery and study of how macropinocytosis supports tumor cell growth and survival by serving as an amino acid supply route in Ras-mutated cancers. He is currently a Professor in the Cancer Metabolism and Microenvironment Program as well as Deputy Director of the Sanford Burnham Prebys Medical Discovery Institute NCI-designated Cancer Center in La Jolla, California, US.
