= Fran Cosmo =

American singer

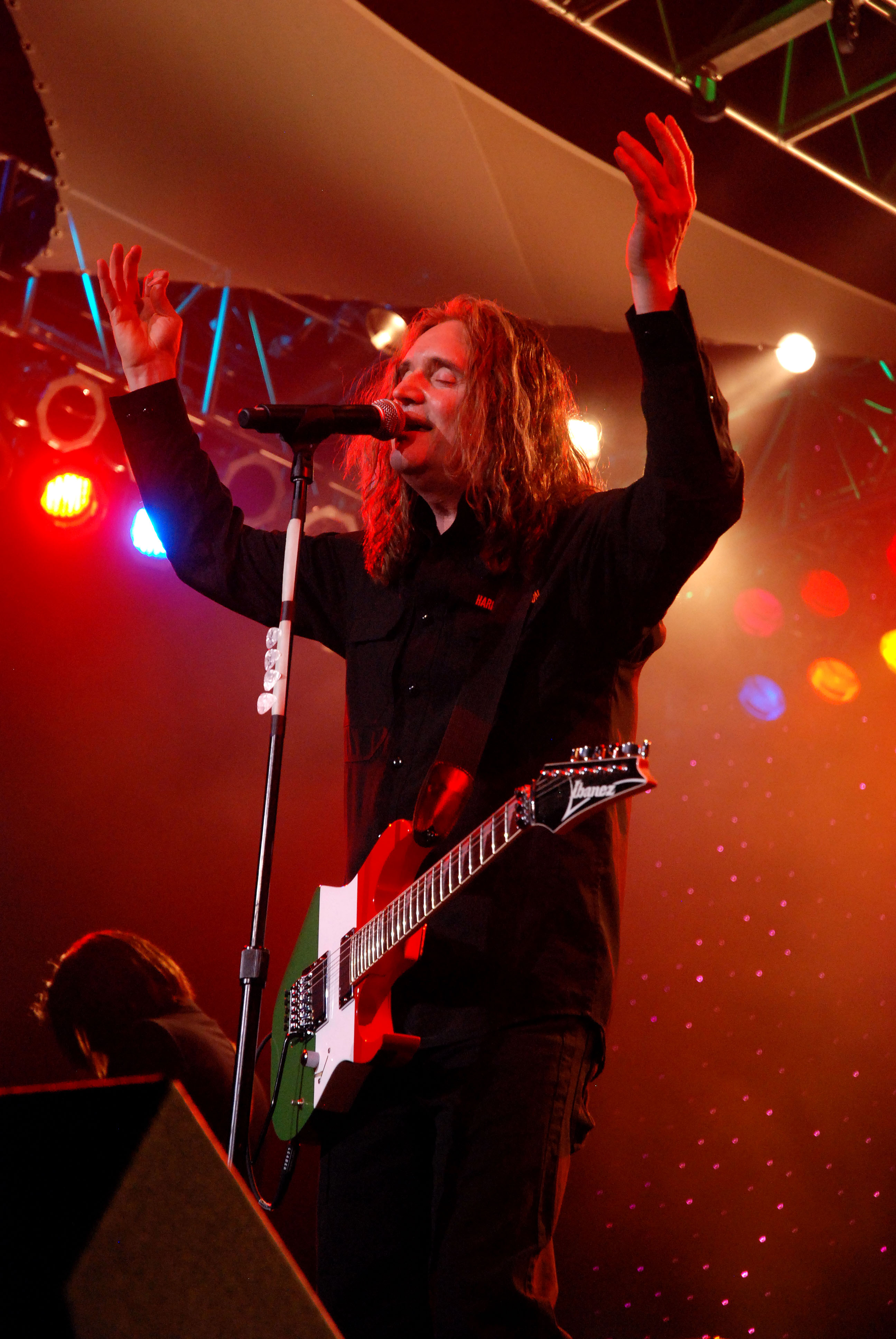
- Cosmo in 2010

Background information
- Genre: Rock
- Occupation: Musician
- Instruments: Vocals, guitar
- Years active: 1980–present
- Formerly of: Boston, Orion the Hunter

Fran Cosmo is an American rock vocalist and guitarist. He was a member of the Boston offshoot band Orion the Hunter from 1983–1985. He later became the official lead vocalist for Boston in the 1990s, singing on the Walk On, Greatest Hits, and Corporate America albums.

== Career ==
Cosmo was first featured on guitarist Barry Goudreau's self-titled solo album in 1980, a prelude to the formation of Orion the Hunter in 1983. Orion the Hunter released an album in 1984 on Columbia Records, which yielded the hit single "So You Ran". The band opened for Aerosmith in 1984.

In 1994, Cosmo was featured as the sole lead vocalist on the platinum Boston album Walk On, which reached #7 on the Billboard Charts and produced three hit singles, including "I Need Your Love", which climbed to #4 on the Mainstream Rock Chart, and "Walk On" that peaked at # 7 on the charts, and lasted for sixteen weeks.

Upon Brad Delp's return to Boston for the concert tour (Delp never missed a Boston tour prior to his death in 2007), the two shared vocals in concert, where Delp said Cosmo covered "the really tough high parts." In 1997, Cosmo was again featured on three of the songs on Boston's 'Greatest Hits' album, and took an even larger role in the 2002 album Corporate America, with the addition of co-production to his credits as vocalist. He sang lead vocals on five of the album's songs and played guitar on one track as well.

Cosmo performed in Boston tours from 1994 to 2004 and currently performs in the band Cosmo with his son, Anton Cosmo.

He also sings in the World Classic Rockers.

Cosmo released his first album with his band in 2006, titled Alien.

== Discography ==
=== with Barry Goudreau ===
- Barry Goudreau (1980)

=== with Orion the Hunter ===
- Orion the Hunter (1984)

=== with Boston ===
- Walk On (1994)
- Greatest Hits (1997)
- Corporate America (2002)

=== with Cosmo ===
- Alien (2006)
