= RTZ (band) =

American rock band (1989–1992)

- Genre: Rock
- Years active: 1989–1992
- Labels: Giant; MTM; Briola
- Spinoffs: Delp and Goudreau, Ernie and the Automatics, Barry Goudreau's Engine Room
- Past members: Brad Delp; Barry Goudreau; Brian Maes; Dave Stefanelli; Tim Archibald; Patty Barkus; Lisa Guyer; Sib Hashian

RTZ was an American rock band that featured Boston band members Brad Delp and Barry Goudreau. The band was formed in the early 1990s.

== History ==
RTZ began as a collaboration between Boston members Brad Delp and Barry Goudreau around 1989. The original 1987 demo of "Face The Music" (featuring Fergie Frederiksen on vocals) was later made available for download at BarryGoudreau.com. Goudreau and Delp were both part of the original Boston line-up and after Goudreau's departure from the band, they stayed in close contact with Delp contributing to Goudreau's solo album and also to a lesser degree on the Orion the Hunter album.

Around 1989, Delp was on hiatus from Boston and looking to get active in writing again. He contacted Goudreau about a possible collaboration and RTZ was formed. Goudreau and Delp brought in keyboardist Brian Maes who was part of the Orion the Hunter touring band, drummer Dave Stefanelli and bass player Tim Archibald. Maes and Stefanelli had previously worked with producer Nick Lowe in England and Archibald's band New Man had released an album on Epic.

Delp and Goudreau landed a deal with Giant Records and the first RTZ album, titled Return to Zero, was released in July 1991. A video was produced for the first single "Face the Music". The band soon hit the road, adding Patty Barkus and Lisa Guyer on backing vocals, and Delp gave Boston his notice. After touring the US extensively, a video was prepared for the single "Until Your Love Comes Back Around" penned by keyboard player Brian Maes. The single was very successful and reached #1 in several markets, #26 in the U.S. Two other tracks, "There's Another Side" and "All You've Got" also got airplay, with the latter reaching #56.

Ultimately, despite extensive touring, the debut album hadn't achieved the success the band had hoped for. RTZ felt that the band was not getting the attention it deserved by the label and asked to be released from their contract. Amidst shopping for a new label, spirits sagged and Brad Delp decided to leave the band and would eventually reunite with Boston for the Walk On tour. Feeling that it would be impossible to replace Delp, RTZ decided to end the band. The Return to Zero album went out of print until April 2013.

Despite formally disbanding after the debut album, RTZ continued to produce subsequent albums, namely from recordings left over from the original recording sessions. Barry searched for a new label and eventually found MTM Records. The recordings were released on September 28, 1998, and the album was titled Lost.

In 2003, Lost and Found was also released, featuring previously unreleased music from the band. Although chronologically the band's third album, the discography description on Barry Goudreau's website indicates the songs may have been developed even before the first Return to Zero album, describing the songs as sustaining "what was to become RTZ in their search for a major label record deal. These songs led to the interest and involvement of Brad Delp which then lead to major record label interest.".

The Delp and Goudreau album was also released in 2003 and was included as a bonus CD in Lost and Found. Unlike the Lost and Lost and Found albums, the material originated as a homegrown project by Barry Goudreau in 2002 with the collaboration of Brad Delp. The album featured the RTZ bandmembers but was released under the band name "Delp and Goudreau" with a different style of music from RTZ's albums.

In 2005, RTZ released two CDs simultaneously, Lost in America and Found in America under band member Brian Maes' Briola Records label. The album contains all the same material that was released on Lost, including the song "Dangerous", which was only available on the Japanese release of Lost. Found in America contains the same material that is on their 2004 release Lost and Found, but includes a bonus live version of the song "Return to Zero".

In 2007, the band reunited (though with former Boston member Sib Hashian on drums) to release a single called "Rockin' Away" under the name "Delp and Goudreau". Written in 2006, it celebrated the 30 year anniversary of Boston and is also an autobiography of Brad Delp's music career. It was mutually decided with Brad Delp's family to be released as a single following Delp's suicide in 2007. Additionally, the band reunited again to release the single "Set The Songbird Free" as a tribute to Delp, with Maes on vocals. They also performed at the Brad Delp "Come Together" tribute concert in 2008.

This entire line-up (with Hashian on drums, and without Delp) also makes up most of the members of the band Ernie and the Automatics which formed in 2006.

RTZ band members Barry Goudreau, Brian Maes (on lead vocals and keyboard) and Tim Archibald continue to collaborate as of 2026, in the band Barry Goudreau's Engine Room.

== Discography ==
=== Studio albums ===
- Return to Zero (1991) (U.S. No. 169)
- Lost (1998)

=== Compilation albums ===
- Lost and Found (2004)

=== Singles ===
| Title | Release | Peak chart positions | | Album |
| Title | Release | US Pop | US Rock | Album |
|---|---|---|---|---|
| "Face the Music" | 1991 | 49 | 5 | Return to Zero |
| "There's Another Side" | 1991 | ― | 19 | Return to Zero |
| "Until Your Love Comes Back Around" | 1992 | 26 | 38 | Return to Zero |
| "All You've Got" | 1992 | 56 | ― | Return to Zero |
| "Rockin' Away" | 2007 | ― | ― | non-album single |
| "Set the Songbird Free" | 2007 | ― | ― | non-album single |
