= Brian Maes =

American musician (born 1956)

- Instruments: Vocals, Keyboards, Harmonica

Brian Maes (born August 8, 1956 in Lynn, Massachusetts) is an American musician. He graduated from Lynn Classical High School in 1974 and from Berklee College of Music in 1979.

== Biography ==
=== Early days ===
Maes' music studies began at the age of eight when he began trumpet lessons with Louis Pascucci which lasted until the age of fourteen when he switched to playing baritone horn at the request of Lynn Public schools senior band director, Fancis Pagnotta. By the age of sixteen, Maes had decided to focus primarily on singing and playing the keyboard. Private instruction from North Shore organist, Marie Fairfield as well as piano studies from jazz pianist, Joe Carlton prepared Maes for his audition and acceptance to Berklee in 1975. While at Berklee, Maes studied classical piano under Emanuel Zambelli and scored an A− on his senior recital, performing an hour of memorized classical pieces and an hour of memorized original material.

=== Career ===
After graduation from Berklee, Maes began touring with Boston-based pop rock group American Teen as keyboardist and vocalist. In 1982 Maes auditioned with RCA recording artist, Robert Ellis Orrall, and was hired to tour in support of the release of the "Special Pain" album on RCA Records. In 1983 Maes travelled to Wales to play keyboards and sing backing vocals on the follow-up album, "Contain Yourself."

Maes was commissioned to return to the United Kingdom to work on other recording projects, acting as arranger, performer and conductor with Orrall bandmates, Charles (Kook) Lawry on guitar, David Stefanelli on drums and Don Walden on bass.

In 1984, Maes began his long-standing relationship with Barry Goudreau when he successfully auditioned for the keyboardist/backing vocalist chair with Orion the Hunter. The band toured as the opening act for Aerosmith on the "Back in the Saddle" tour during the summer of 1984. After their first tour, Orion the Hunter disbanded. Maes and Goudreau made the decision to stay together and work on new material.

In 1985, while still writing and recording with Barry Goudreau, Maes began collaborating with Peter Wolf, The J. Geils Band frontman, doing pre-production and arranging work in the recording studio for Wolf's solo record "Come As You Are". Maes, Lawry, Stefanelli and Waldon all worked together in the studio recording the songs that would later be on this record and all received credit on the label. This collaboration between Wolf and Maes began a long-standing personal and professional relationship that would bring them together on numerable musical endeavors. It was during this time that Maes presented Wolf with the song "Until Your Love Comes Back Around" for consideration but Wolf passed on the song. Brian and Peter would come together again in 1993 to tour the United States and Japan in support of Peter's Long Line album. The band was then called "Peter Wolf and the House Party 5" with Tim Archibald on bass, David Stefanelli on drums and backing vocals, Johnny A. on guitar, Doug Dube on Hammond B3 and backing vocals, Brian Maes on keys and backing vocals and Peter Wolf on lead vocals. Maes was also a member of RTZ.

==== Latest activities ====
Maes released the solo album Songs for Madeline in 2004, dedicated to his daughter.

Maes was currently the lead singer and keyboardist for Ernie and the Automatics which features original and former members of the band Boston, Barry Goudreau on guitar and Sib Hashian on drums. Fellow RTZ and Peter Wolf's House Party Five bandmate, bassist, Tim Archibald is also a member of Ernie and the Automatics, along with tenor saxophonist, Michael "Tunes" Antunes from John Cafferty & The Beaver Brown Band. The Automatics' new album, Low Expectations, was produced by Brian Maes and was set for release on February 17, 2009 on "Open E" Records, the new label owned by Ernie Boch, Jr, who is also a guitarist in the band.

Maes also leads the Brian Maes Band, which also features Archibald and guitarist Kook Lawry.

In late 2011, Maes co-wrote several songs on the newest Billy Shake album, Crashing Down.

Maes is currently touring with Barry Goudreau's Engine room in support of their 2017 album “full steam ahead” fronting vocals and keys.
