= 2003 in association football =

The following are the football (soccer) events of the year 2003 throughout the world.

== Events ==
- Confederations Cup: Host nation France wins a tournament marred by tragedy (see Deaths.)
- UEFA Champions League: AC Milan wins 3–2 on penalties over Juventus, after a 0–0 draw at Old Trafford. This was AC Milan's 6th European Cup.
- UEFA Cup: FC Porto wins 3–2 in the final against Celtic, after extra time, with a silver goal by Derlei. This is Porto's first UEFA Cup title.
- European Super Cup: AC Milan beats FC Porto 1–0, winning the cup for the 4th time.
- Copa Libertadores: Boca Juniors of Argentina won the cup for the fifth time against Santos of Brazil in a 5–1 aggregate.
- Recopa Sudamericana: Olimpia of Paraguay won 2–0 in the final against San Lorenzo of Argentina.
- FA Cup: Arsenal win 1–0 over Southampton
- FA Premier league – Manchester United wins the Premier League by 5 points over Arsenal.
- Women's World Cup: Germany wins the final against Sweden 2–1 after extra time.
- 22 January – Dutch club Sparta Rotterdam fires manager Dolf Roks, who is replaced on 7 February by former player Chris Dekker.
- 28 January – Head coach Robert Maaskant leaves Go Ahead Eagles and returns to RBC Roosendaal.
- 7 March – Mexican club Guadalajara appoints Hans Westerhof as their new technical director.
- 26 March – Manager Mike Snoei is fired by Dutch club Vitesse Arnhem to Ajax, and replaced by former player Edward Sturing.
- 17 June – Manchester United sells English football star David Beckham to Real Madrid for €35 million.
- 28 June – Italy's Piedmont wins the third UEFA Regions' Cup, beating France's Maine 2–1 in Heidenheim an der Brenz.
- 8 August – Satellite TV's Rupert Murdoch British Sky Broadcasting pay €510 million for transmission of FA Premier League seasons 2004–2007.
- 10 August – PSV wins the Johan Cruijff Schaal, the annual opening of the new season in the Eredivisie, by a 3–1 win over Utrecht in the Amsterdam ArenA.
- 25 September – Dutch club Zwolle sacks manager Peter Boeve.
- 1 October – Technical director Hans Westerhof is named head coach of Mexican club Guadalajara.
- 20 November – Manager Rinus Israël leaves ADO Den Haag and moves to Al Wahda in the United Arab Emirates. Lex Schoenmaker is his successor in The Hague.
- 28 November – In an Asian Cup qualifier between Iran and Lebanon, Ali Daei scores his 85th goal for the Iranian national team, breaking the record of Hungarian legend Ferenc Puskás.
- 14 December – Boca Juniors wins the Intercontinental Cup in Tokyo, Japan for the third time, by defeating Italy's AC Milan on penalties (3–1), after a 1–1 draw at the end of extra-time.

== Winners national club championship ==
=== Africa ===
- Algeria – USM Alger
- Cameroon – Cottonsport Garoua
- Ivory Coast – ASEC Mimosas
- Egypt – Zamalek
- Libya – Al-Ittihad
- Mali – Stade Malien
- Morocco – Hassania Agadir
- Nigeria – Enyimba
- Tunisia – Espéance

=== Asia ===
- Hong Kong – Sun Hei
- Iran – Sepahan
- Japan – Yokohama F. Marinos
- Qatar – Al-Sadd
- South Korea – Seongnam Ilhwa Chunma
- Thailand – BEC Tero Sasana

=== Europe ===
- Croatia – Dinamo Zagreb
- Denmark – Copenhagen
- England – Manchester United
- France – Lyon
- Germany – Bayern Munich
- Iceland – KR
- Republic of Ireland: Shelbourne
- Italy – Juventus
- Netherlands – PSV
- Portugal – Porto
- Russia – CSKA Moscow
- Scotland – Rangers
- Serbia and Montenegro – Partizan
- Spain – Real Madrid
- Sweden – Djurgården
- Turkey – Beşiktaş

=== North and Central America ===
- Canada – Brampton Hitmen (CPSL)
- Mexico
  - Clausura – Monterrey
  - Apertura – Pachuca
- United States – San Jose Earthquakes (MLS)

=== South America ===
- Argentina
  - 2002–03 Clausura – River Plate
  - 2003–04 Apertura – Boca Juniors
- Bolivia – Bolívar
  - Torneo Apertura – The Strongest
  - Torneo Clausura – The Strongest
- Brazil – Cruzeiro
- Colombia – Once Caldas
- Ecuador – LDU Quito
- Paraguay – Club Libertad
- (Peru) Club Alianza Lima
- Uruguay – Peñarol

== International tournaments ==
- UNCAF Nations Cup in Panama (9–23 February 2003)
  1. Costa Rica
  2. Guatemala
  3. El Salvador
- Baltic Cup in Estonia (3–5 July 2003)
  1. Latvia
  2. Lithuania
  3. Estonia
- Pan American Games in Santo Domingo, Dominican Republic (2–15 August 2003)
  - Men's Tournament
  1. Argentina
  2. Brazil
  3. Mexico
  - Women's Tournament
  1. Brazil
  2. Canada
  3. Mexico
- FIFA U-20 World Cup in United Arab Emirates (27 November – 19 December 2003)
  1. Brazil
  2. Spain
  3. Colombia
- FIFA U-17 World Championship in Finland (13–30 August 2003)
  1. Brazil
  2. Spain
  3. Argentina
- Afro–Asian Games in Hyderabad, India (22–31 October 2003)
  1. India
  2. Uzbekistan
  3. Zimbabwe

== Births ==
- 9 January – Ricardo Pepi, US international
- 18 January – Devyne Rensch, Dutch international
- 19 January – Ilaix Moriba, Guinean international
- 21 January – Hannibal Mejbri, Tunisian international
- 23 January – Arian Moreno, Venezuelan footballer
- 27 February – Juan Ignacio Cabrera, Uruguayan footballer
- 16 March – Killian Camélé, French professional footballer
- 23 March – Ísak Bergmann Jóhannesson, Icelandic international
- 4 April – Harvey Elliott, English footballer
- 12 April – Simon Ngapandouetnbu, Cameroonian footballer
- 19 April – Rareș Ilie, Romanian youth international
- 21 April – Xavi Simons, Dutch footballer
- 27 April – Zidane Iqbal, Iraqi international
- 1 May – Charlie Savage, Welsh international
- 2 May – Marcos Leonardo, Brazilian youth international
- 4 May – Florian Wirtz, German international
- 7 May – Kevin Paredes, US youth international
- 19 May – Park Hyun-bin, South Korean international
- 31 May – Benjamin Šeško, Slovenian youth international
- 1 June – Jan Kuźma, Polish professional footballer
- 2 June – Yusuf Demir, Austrian-Turkish footballer
- 11 June – Antonio Bokanovic, Austrian footballer
- 28 June – Brandon Aguilera, Costa Rican international
- 29 June – Jude Bellingham, English international
- 11 July – Vishva Shinde, Indian professional footballer
- 12 August – Martín Luciano, Argentine club footballer
- 2 September – Kauã (Kauã Jesus Tenório), Brazilian footballer
- 28 October – Antonio Miuțescu, Romanian professional footballer
- 5 November – Shea Charles, Northern Irish footballer
- 7 November – Milos Kerkez, Hungarian international

== Deaths ==
=== January ===
- 10 January – Julinho (73), Brazilian footballer

=== February ===
- 26 February – Antoni Torres (59), Spanish footballer and manager
- 28 February – Albert Batteux (83), French footballer

=== April ===
- 17 April – Jean-Pierre Dogliani (60), French footballer
- 24 April – Gino Orlando (73), Brazilian forward, 9 times capped for the Brazil national football team.

=== May ===
- 10 May – Pepillo (69), Spanish footballer
- 31 May – Karol Miklosz (87), Polish-Soviet footballer, referee and football administrator

=== June ===
- 26 June – Marc-Vivien Foé (28), Cameroonian footballer

=== July ===
- 31 July – John Aston, Sr., English defender, England squad member at the 1950 FIFA World Cup. (81)
- 31 July – Bigode, Brazilian defender, runner-up at the 1950 FIFA World Cup. (81)

=== August ===
- 1 August – Guy Thys (80), Belgian footballer and manager
- 8 August – Jimmy Davis (21), English footballer
- 13 August – Lothar Emmerich (61), German footballer
- 14 August – Helmut Rahn (73), German footballer
- 31 August – Pierre Cahuzac (76), French footballer

=== October ===
- 1 October – Cheung Yiu Lun (25), Hong Kong footballer

=== November ===
- 21 November – Emil Pažický (76), Slovak footballer
