= 1810 in Russia =

Events from the year 1810 in Russia

== Incumbents ==
- Monarch – Alexander I

== Events ==
- Russo-Circassian War
  - April 30 - Battle of the Cherek River
- Russo-Persian War (1804–1813)
- Russo-Turkish War (1806–1812)
  - September 9 - Battle of Batin
- Anglo-Russian War (1807–1812)
- The Saint Petersburg main military engineering school becomes the first engineering higher learning institution in the Russian Empire, after the addition of officers' classes, and the application of a five-year term of teaching.
- Ministry of Police of the Russian Empire
- Council of Ministers of Russia
- State Council (Russian Empire)

== Births ==
- Marie-Clementine Bagration (d. 1829) - Georgian princess
- Yekaterina Bakunina (d. 1894) - nurse
- Evert Julius Bonsdorff (d. 1898) - Finnish physician and naturalist
- Grigory Gagarin (d. 1893) - general, painter, illustrator, friend of Lermontov
- Ivan Ganetsky (d. 1887) - general
- Platon Ioseliani (d. 1875) - Georgian historian and civil servant
- Isaac I of Optina (d. 1894) - saint, monastery leader
- Vladimir Istomin (d. 1855) - admiral, a hero of the Siege of Sevastopol (1854–1855)
- Laurynas Ivinskis (d. 1881) - Lithuanian teacher, publisher, translator, and lexicographer
- Andrey Krayevsky (d. 1889) - publisher and journalist, editor of the literary magazine Otechestvennye Zapiski
- Evgraf Fedorovich Krendovsky (d. 1870s?) - painter
- Alexander Loganovsky (d. 1855) - sculptor
- Sergei Mal'tsov (d. 1893) - general, industrialist
- Apollon Mokritsky (d. 1870) - Ukrainian painter
- Ivan Savvich Morozov (d. 1864) - entrepreneur
- Victor Motschulsky (d. 1871) - entomologist who studied beetles
- Leopold Niemirowski (d. 1883) - Polish revolutionary and painter
- Nikolay Pirogov (d. 1881) - doctor, father of Russian battlefield medicine
- Placyd Jankowski (d. 1872) - Polish Orthodox priest, translator, and writer
- Jurgis Pliateris (d. 1836) - Lithuanian bibliographer
- Pyotr Shchebalsky (d. 1886) - literary critic and historian, editor
- Hayyim Selig Slonimski (d. 1904) - Jewish science writer, scientist, inventor, and publisher
- Avgust Tsivolko (d. 1839) - navigator, Arctic explorer
- Zinaida Ivanovna Yusupova (d. 1893) - aristocrat
- Zdzisław Zamoyski (d. 1855) - Polish aristocrat

== Deaths ==
- Maria Danilova (b. 1793) - ballet dancer
- Kozma Gamburov (b. ?) - stage actor, opera singer
- Fyodor Gordeyev (b. 1744) - sculptor
- Ivan Ivanovich Isaev (b. 1748) - general
- Ivan Ivelich (b. circa 1745) - general
- Nachman of Breslov (b. 1772) - rabbi, founder of Breslov Hasidic dynasty
- Emmanouil Papadopoulos - (b. ?) - general of Greek origin from Kea (island)
- Natalia Shelikhova (b. 1765) - businessperson, a founder of the Russian-American Company
- Yekaterina Vorontsova-Dashkova (b. 1743) - noblewoman, friend of Catherine the Great
