= Kuzma (surname) =

Kuzma is a Slavic-language surname derived from the given name Kuzma, ultimately from Cosmas. Notable people with this surname include:

- Csaba Kuzma (1954-2026), Hungarian boxer
- Eddie Kuzma (1911–1996), American auto racing builder
- George Kuzma (1925-2008), American Catholic bishop
- Greg Kuzma, American poet, essayist, poetry reviewer, and editor
- Jan Kuźma, Polish footballer
- Janina Kuzma, New Zealand freestyle skier
- Kamil Kuzma (born 1988), Slovak footballer
- Kim Kuzma, Canadian musician
- Kyle Kuzma (born 1995), American basketball player
- Marek Kuzma (born 1988), Slovak footballer
- Marta Kuzma, American curator, art theorist, and educator
- Nora Kuzma, birth name of Traci Lords, American actress
- Stanislav Kuzma, Slovenian footballer
- Stanislovas Kuzma (1947-2012), Lithuanian sculptor
- Szymon Kuźma, Polish footballer
- Tom Kuzma, American football player

== See also ==
- Cusma (disambiguation)
- Kusma (disambiguation)
