= Kuzma (given name) =

Kuzma (Russian: Кузьма) or Kozma (Russian: Козьма) is a Slavic masculine given name of Greek origin, derived from Cosmas. The surnames Kuzma, Kozma, and Kuzmin come from the given name. Notable people with the name include:

== Kuzma ==
- Kuzma (tepčija), Serbian nobleman
- Kuzma Minin, Russian merchant and hero of the Polish-Muscovite War (1605–1618)
- Kuzma Alekseyev
- Kuzma Andrianov, Soviet chemist
- Kuzma Chorny, Belarusian poet, writer, dramatist, and opinion journalist
- Kuzma Derevyanko, Soviet Army officer and signatory to the Japanese surrender of 1945
- Kuzma Galitsky, Soviet army general
- Kuzma Gnidash, Soviet officer and intelligence officer
- Kuzma Grebennik, Soviet lieutenant general
- Kuzma Kiselyov, Soviet diplomat, statesman, and politician
- Kuzma Kovačić, Croatian academic sculptor and professor
- Kuzma Parfyonov, Soviet Army major general
- Kuzma Petrov-Vodkin, Soviet/Russian painter and writer
- Kuzma Podlas, Soviet lieutenant general
- Kuzma Sinilov, Soviet lieutenant general
- Kuzma Trubnikov, Soviet colonel-general
- Kuzma Trufanov, Soviet major general

== Kozma ==
- Kyr Kozma, Serbian painter
- Kozma Damjanović, Serbian icon painter
- Kozma Gamburov, Russian stage actor and opera singer
- Kozma Prutkov, fictional author
- Kozma Soldatyonkov, Russian industrialist, mecenate, philanthropist, art collector and publisher
- Kozma Spassky-Avtonomov, Russian scientist

== See also ==
- Kuzma (surname)
- Kozma (surname)
