= Siberian Education =

- Directed by: Gabriele Salvatores
- Written by: Gabriele Salvatores; Sandro Petraglia
- Story by: Nicolai Lilin (novel)
- Starring: John Malkovich; Arnas Fedaravicius
- Cinematography: Italo Petriccione
- Edited by: Massimo Fiocchi
- Music by: Mauro Pagani
- Release date: 2013
- Running time: 110 min
- Country: Italy
- Language: English

Siberian Education, known as Deadly Code in the United States; is a 2013 Italian English language crime-drama film directed by Gabriele Salvatores.

The film was nominated to 11 David di Donatello awards, including Best Film and Best Director. Mauro Pagani won the Ciak d'oro for Best Score.

== Production ==
The movie is based on the falsified autobiographic novel with the same name written by Nicolai Lilin, the pen name of Nikolai Verzhbitsky.

Many of the actors, especially child actors, are Lithuanian. Winter scenes were also shot in Lithuania (instead of the actual Russia). All other scenes were shot in parts of Italy. The movie itself was filmed in English, with Italian subtitles.

The finale was changed after a test screening with an audience in London.

Lilin's novel was never published in Russia because the author allegedly banned the sale of rights to it in the country. Kommersant's journalist Elena Chernenko found out that many facts from the book and the author’s biography are not confirmed by sources and stories of Lilin’s acquaintances, and Lilin himself stated that he repeatedly emphasized in interviews that his book is not an autobiography and that his Western publishers position it as such.

== Plot ==
Kolyma (Note: Kolyma: a reference to Kolyma) and Gagarin (Note: Gagarin: a reference to Yuri Gagarin) are two boys in a Siberian village (Note: There are no "ethnically Siberian" villages in Transnistria, neitrher there is a "Siberian ethnicity") in Transnistria being raised by Kolyma's grandfather Kuzja. (Note: Kuzja or Kuzya is a diminutive for the given name Kuzma) Kuzja imposes a very strict education to the children, focusing on hatred of the Soviet officials such as bankers or the military, which are regarded as enemies. Following one of their robbery attempts against the Soviets, Gagarin is captured, tried and imprisoned. Seven years later Gagarin is freed, but he discovers that his world has completely changed and he does not know how to succeed in solving his problems. Gagarin finally discovers that the ideals of his people have collapsed in the drug trade, so he enters into this new system but he ends up in conflict with Kolyma.

== Cast ==
- John Malkovich as Grandfather Kuzya
- Arnas Fedaravicius as "Kolyma"
  - Arnas Sliesoraitis as Kolyma Age 10
- Vilius Tumalavičius as Yuri "Gagarin" Lebedev
  - Pijus Grudė as Gagarin Age 10
- Peter Stormare as "Ink"
- Eleanor Tomlinson as Xenya Sakurova
- Jonas Trukanas as "Mel"
  - Ernestas Markevičius as Mel Age 10
- Vitalij Porchnev as "Vitalic"
  - Erikas Zaremba as Vitalic Age 10
- James Tratas as "Shorty" (credited as Zilvinas Tratas)
- Airida Gintautaitė as Anna, Kolyma's Mother
- Arvydas Lebeliūnas as Dr. Nikolai Sakurov
- Viktoras Karpusenkovas as "Plank"
- Daiva Stubraitė as Aunt Katya
- Jokūbas Bateika as "Meza"
- Dainius Jankauskas as "Vulture"
- Denisas Kolomyckis as Igor, The Shnyr
- Vytautas Rumšas as Dimitry (credited as Vitautas Rumshas)

== Reception ==
Siberian Education received mixed to positive reviews. James Luxford from The National (UAE) gave to the film a score of 3/5 writing: "Sombre and grim, this coming-of-age tale keeps the scale small but the issues big, hinting at wider questions of good and evil in the world, but an inability to offer truly memorable moments creates a ceiling artistically". He also appreciated Salvatores' script and Malkovich's performance.

Catherine Brown from Filmink praised the film saying that:" Despite its faults, the film is worth viewing not only for Malkovich's brilliant performance".

The Hollywood Reporter gave to the film a positive review calling it: "[...] a strong piece of exotica".

Lee Marshal from Screen Daily praised the lush photography and convincing lead performance, but noticed that generally the story didn't feel authentic and the heavily accented dialogue is difficult to take seriously.
