= Kuzma =

Kuzma may refer to:

== People ==
- Kuzma (given name), a Slavic given name derived from Cosmas
  - Kuzma Minin, Russian merchant and hero of the Polish-Muscovite War (1605–1618)
  - Kuzma Derevyanko, Soviet Army officer and signatory to the Japanese surrender of 1945
  - Kuzma Petrov-Vodkin, Soviet/Russian painter and writer
  - Kuzma (tepčija), Serbian nobleman
- Kuzma (surname)

== Places ==
- Kuzma, Kuzma, a settlement in the Municipality of Kuzma, Slovenia
- Municipality of Kuzma, a municipality in Slovenia
- Kuzma, Croatia, a village near Voćin

== See also ==
- Cusma (disambiguation)
- Kusma (disambiguation)
