= Kuzmin (surname) =

Kuzmin (masculine, Russian: Кузьмин) or Kuzmina (feminine, Russian: Кузьминa) is a Russian surname that is derived from the male given name Kuzma and literally means Kuzma's. Notable people with the surname include:

- Afanasijs Kuzmins (born 1947), Latvian shooter
- Anastasiya Vladimirovna Kuzmina (born 1984), Russian-born Slovak biathlete
- Andrei Kuzmin (born 1981), Russian ice hockey player
- Dmitri Kuzmin, a Russian-born Kyrgyzstani swimmer
- Dmitry Kuzmin (mayor), a Russian politician and mayor
- Dmitry Kuzmin (senator) (born 1975), a Russian politician, senator
- Dmitry Kuzmin-Karavayev (1886–1959), a Russian former Bolshevik and Catholic priest
- Dmitry Kuzmin-Karavayev (captain), one of Leino's prisoners
- Dmitry Kuzmin-Karavayev (general), general of the Russian Imperial Army
- Dmitry Kuzmin, Russian poet, critic, and publisher; anti-homophobia activist
- Dmytro Kuzmin, Ukrainian paralympic swimmer
- Ekaterina Kuzmina (born 1996), Russian curler
- Eugenia Kuzmina (born 1981), Russian-American actress, comedian and model
- Fyodor Sergeyevich Kuzmin (born 1983), Russian table tennis player
- Gennady Pavlovich Kuzmin (1946–2020), Ukrainian chess player and coach
- Grigori Kuzmin (1917–1988), Estonian astronomer
- Igor Kuzmin (born 1982), Estonian rower
- Iosif Iosifovich Kuzmin (1910–1996), Soviet politician
- Irina Kuzmina (born 1986), Latvian tennis player
- Ivan Nikolayevich Kuzmin (born 1962), Russian ski-orienteer
- Leonid Kuzmin, Belarusian pianist
- Matvey Kuzmich Kuzmin (1858–1942), Russian peasant and Soviet hero
- Mikhail Kuzmin (1872–1936), Russian poet, musician and novelist
- Nikolai Nikolayevich Kuzmin (1883–1938), Soviet politician and military commander
- Oleg Aleksandrovich Kuzmin (born 1981), Russian football player
- Renat Ravelievich Kuzmin (born 1967), Ukrainian public prosecutor
- Rodion Osievich Kuzmin (1891–1949), Russian mathematician
- Sergei Kuzmin (disambiguation), multiple people
- Stanislav Kuzmin (born 1986), Kazakhstani swimmer
- Svetlana Kuzmina (born 1969), Russian swimmer
- Tatiana Kuzmina (born 1990), Russian taekwondo athlete
- Vadim Kuzmin (physicist) (1937–2015), Russian physicist
- Vadim Kuzmin (musician) (1964–2012), Russian musician
- Valentin Kuzmin (1941–2008), Russian swimmer
- Vladimir Kuzmin (born 1955), Russian musician
- Vladimir Kuzmin-Karavayev (1859–1928), Russian lawyer and politician
- Vladimir Kuzmin (serial killer) (born 1965), Russian serial killer and thief
- Elena Efimovna Kuzmina, Russian archaeologist
- Yelena Kuzmina, Soviet actress
- Yevgeniya Kuzmina (born 1986), Kazakhstani ski-orienteer
