= Kozma =

Kozma is a Hungarian surname. Notable people with the surname include:

- Andrea Kozma, Austrian field hockey player
- Dominik Kozma (born 1991), Hungarian swimmer
- Gady Kozma, Israeli mathematician
- Imre Kozma (1940–2024), Hungarian Roman Catholic priest and human rights activist
- István Kozma (footballer) (born 1964), Hungarian footballer
- István Kozma (wrestler) (1939–1970), Hungarian wrestler
- Július Kozma (1929–2009), Slovak chess player
- Lajos Kozma, Hungarian operatic tenor
- László Kozma, Hungarian electrical engineer
- László Kozma (rower), Hungarian rower
- Louis Kozma, Belgian swimmer
- Matthew Kozma, American politician
- Mihály Kozma (born 1949), Hungarian footballer
- Miklós Kozma (1884−1941), Hungarian politician
- Pete Kozma (born 1988), American baseball player
- Péter Kozma (politician), Hungarian politician
- Péter Kozma (skier) (1961-2023), Swiss-Hungarian alpine skier, Olympian, visual artist, and light artist
- Robert Kozma (politician) (born 1983), Serbian politician, journalist, and a member of the National Assembly
- Robert Kozma (professor), American professor of mathematics at the University of Memphis
- Richárd Kozma, Hungarian footballer
- Sándor Kozma, Hungarian politician and jurist
- Susan Kozma-Orlay, Hungarian-Australian modernist designer
- Tibor Kozma, American conductor, pianist, accompanist, and vocal coach

== See also ==
- Kozma (given name)
- Yadegar, Razavi Khorasan, also known as Kozma, village in Razavi Khorasan Province, Iran
- Kosma
