= Nicolai Lilin =

Italian-Moldovan author (born 1980)

- Николай Лилин
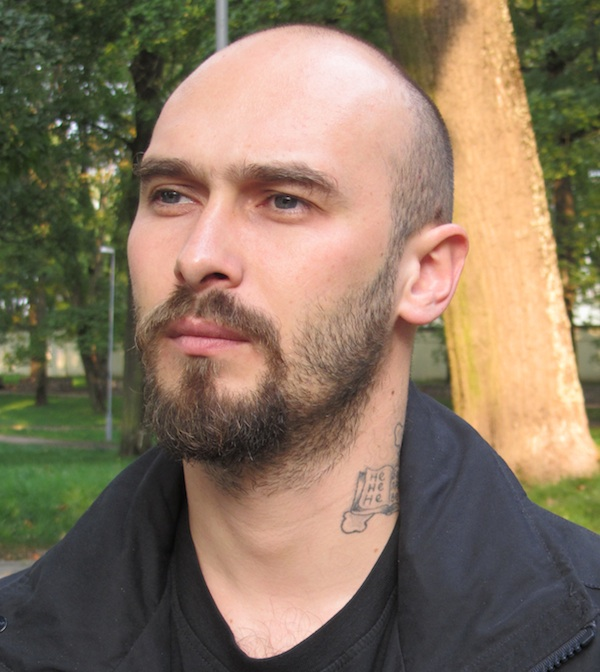
- Lilin in 2011
- Born: Nikolai Yurievich Verzhbitsky; 12 February 1980 (age 46); Bender, Moldavian SSR, Soviet Union
- Citizenship: Italian; Moldovan
- Occupations: Author; tattoo artist; television presenter
- Writing career
- Language: Russian, Italian
- Years active: since 2009
- Genres: Novel; Biography
- Notable works: Siberian Education: Growing up in a Criminal Underworld (2009); Free Fall: A Sniper's Story from Chechnya (2010)
- Website: nicolaililin.it

Nikolai Yurievich Verzhbitsky (Note: Russian: Николай Юрьевич Вержбицкий.) (born 12 February 1980), known as Nicolai Lilin, is an Italian‑Moldovan writer and tattoo artist from Transnistria. He moved to Italy in the early 2000s and published his first novel, Siberian Education, in 2009; it was later adapted into a 2013 film. The novel, which Lilin claimed was based on his own experiences as a member of a Siberian criminal gang in his native Bender, became a bestseller in Italy, though a number of journalists and historians have labelled it a fake memoir. Similar criticisms were directed at its sequel, Free Fall, which recounts the author's alleged experiences during the Second Chechen War.

Although he initially presented himself as a vocal critic of Russia under Vladimir Putin, Lilin has consistently adopted anti‑Ukrainian and anti‑Western positions since the outbreak of the Russo-Ukrainian War. He has drawn attention for expressing Eurasianist views and for disseminating conspiracy theories, false information and defamatory remarks.

== Biography ==
=== Ancestry ===
Lilin claims to be the descendent of nomadic, Christianised, formerly tiger-venerating indigenous Siberian people who adorned themselves with tattoos meant to symbolise their life experiences and to serve as identification, a practice he says dates back 5,000 years. He has given differing accounts as to the exact provenance of his ancestors, from southern Siberia in 2011, to Yakutia in 2017. These natives, which he calls "Efey", would raid Indian and Chinese caravan convoys until they were purged by tsarist forces. A splinter group called "Urkas" took refuge in the taiga and formed a criminal organization, resisting all attempts at subjugating them until finally being defeated by the Soviets. By order of Stalin, the Urkas were deported to Bender, Moldova in 1938.

Lilin's claims regarding his heritage have been disputed. Former Kremlinologist and La Stampa journalist Anna Zafesova, as well as criminologist Federico Varese, noted that "Urka" does not denote an ethnic group as Lilin claims, but is a term first recorded in the early 20th century referring to professional thieves, while historian Pavel Polian noted that the Efey never existed. Both Polian and Varese, as well as historian Donald Rayfield, anthropologist Michael Bobick and Kommersant journalist Elena Chernenko, further pointed out that the victims of population transfer in the Soviet Union were sent to Siberia, but never from there, and that Stalin could not have deported the Urkas to Bender in 1938, as the city was still part of Romania. Lilin himself would admit in an interview with Le Monde that he didn't know who the Urkas were exactly, having been told about them by his grandfather, but was unable to find any corroborating archive material. When asked about the inconsistency of Siberians being deported to Moldova during an interview with Vanity Fair, Lilin stated that the Urkas were sent to do the Soviet regime's "dirty work" in ridding Bender of pro-European Jews, Ukrainian nationalists, Romanians and Moldovans.

According to an uncle of Lilin, the Verzhbitskys originated in Poland, and settled in Moldova during the 19th century. A rehabilitation letter and data uncovered by Memorial regarding Lilin's great-grandfather show that he was not a deported Siberian criminal, but a Kurtamysh-based factory worker born in Tiraspol who was executed by the NKVD in 1938 on charges of being a Romanian agent.

=== Early life ===
If we summarise the information from Nicolai Lilin's book [Siberian Education], his interviews in the Western press and his speeches at book fairs, then by the age of 23 the author had managed to: serve two terms in a Transnistrian prison, be under investigation in Russia, serve three years as a sniper in Chechnya and a couple more years as a mercenary in Israel, Iraq and Afghanistan. At 24, he got a job as a fisherman on a ship in Ireland, then moved to Italy, where he got married, opened a tattoo parlour, wrote a bestseller and almost became a victim of a politically motivated assassination attempt.

— Elena Chernenko

Lilin was born Nikolai Yurievich Verzhbitsky to Yuri and Lilia in Bender, in the Moldavian SSR. He describes a poverty-stricken childhood with no bathroom and where gas and electricity were considered luxuries. He stated in a 2010 interview that he had never attended school, though he would contradict this in subsequent writings and interviews. In an interview with Delo, he described an incident where his father discovered he had smoked for the first time, and was forced to smoke three packets of cigarettes in a row as punishment, receiving beatings if he tried stopping. This resulted in him being hospitalised for a week, and left him with the habit of vomiting when in the vicinity of someone smoking.

Lilin claims that at the age of 12, with the outbreak of the Transnistria War, he was handed a firearm for the first time, and was involved with other children in gathering intelligence and munitions during the battle of Bender. He alleges that during the conflict he lost an uncle and a cousin to a gang of neo-Nazis led by Andriy Parubiy. He states that after the war, he took part in a gang war alongside his father, who was a bank robber. His parents separated after his father suffered three assassination attempts and moved to Greece, while his mother moved to Italy, leaving Lilin with his grandparents. Lilin describes his grandfather as an elder member of a criminal gang who first taught him the ways of the Urkas and acted as a surrogate father. In several interviews, he claimed that his grandfather was a Siberian hunter and Gulag survivor who, despite being anticommunist, fought as a sniper during World War II and was on the same convoy that took Vasily Zaitsev to Stalingrad.

Lilin has stated that he served nine months of a four-year sentence in a maximum security juvenile prison at the age of 12 for attempted murder after stabbing a drug pusher in self-defence. He also claims that he maimed a man who had driven a young boy to suicide. Lilin states that he killed for the first time at age 14, with the victim being a "Gypsy" drug dealer whom he shot with his grandfather's revolver. Still at age 14, per his narrative, he stabbed a boy in the back, leaving him paralysed for life. A character profile of Lilin from Transnistria, however, states that his only recorded crimes involved stealing boats on the Dniester.

According to Igor Popushnoy, a resident of Bender who knew Lilin since he was 19, Lilin habitually invented stories about himself, and had never served time in prison, having instead earned a living in law enforcement. Another acquaintance from Bender, Viktor Dadetsky, implied that Lilin was influenced by the movies he had borrowed from his video rental shop, particularly Fight Club and Fear and Loathing in Las Vegas.

=== Service in Chechnya ===
Lilin claims that at age 18 he began serving in the Russian army. In a Vanity Fair interview, he claimed he was drafted while studying yoga in India, while in an interview with Oliver Bullough he stated he had volunteered. He further claims to have served for two years and three months in the antiterrorism corps of the GRU during the Second Chechen War. Some Italian sources state he served in the 56th Guards Air Assault Regiment.

He claims to have briefly taken part in the battle of Grozny and said in an interview with Il Giornale that his unit had tortured prisoners of war. He claims he encountered very few Chechen guerrillas during the conflict, instead fighting mercenaries from Afghanistan, Jordan and Saudi Arabia. He has described two instances during the war in which he was nearly killed: the first occurring when he was shot in the chest with an AK-47, surviving thanks to his body armour, the second happening when a vehicle he was travelling in was capsized by a grenade launcher which left two comrades dead and himself with damage to his hearing.

Inquiries undertaken by Elena Chernenko however show that his name does not appear in any sources close to the Russian Ministry of Defence, and his old acquaintance Igor Popushnoy stated that he had never served in the army, while Donald Rayfield expressed doubt as to whether a citizen of Transnistria could have been drafted by the Russian armed forces.

=== Private security ===
Lilin claims that after leaving the army, he attempted to find work in Saint Petersburg, but was rebuffed for being a war veteran. While there, he was arrested for illegal firearm ownership and held in custody for several months, during which he claims to have been regularly beaten. Per his narrative, he later worked as a private security guard for a Russian opposition group with links to Chechen terrorists. He later spent three years working for a private Israeli security company as an antiterrorism consultant. He states that at one point he worked as a drill instructor for the Afghan National Security Forces.

He concluded his service after injuring his leg in Iraq while working as a bodyguard for Western businessmen. In an article he wrote for L'Espresso, he stated that he had been shot, while in his interview with Elena Chernenko, he stated that his leg was injured by a landmine, subsequently elaborating that it had been triggered after an American serviceman jumped on it. He states that he later moved to Siberia to live with his great-uncle by the Lena river, while struggling with PTSD. After retiring, he claims to have been contacted by an ex comrade offering him a position in a pro-Gaddafi mercenary group during the Libyan civil war, which he refused.

=== Move to Italy ===
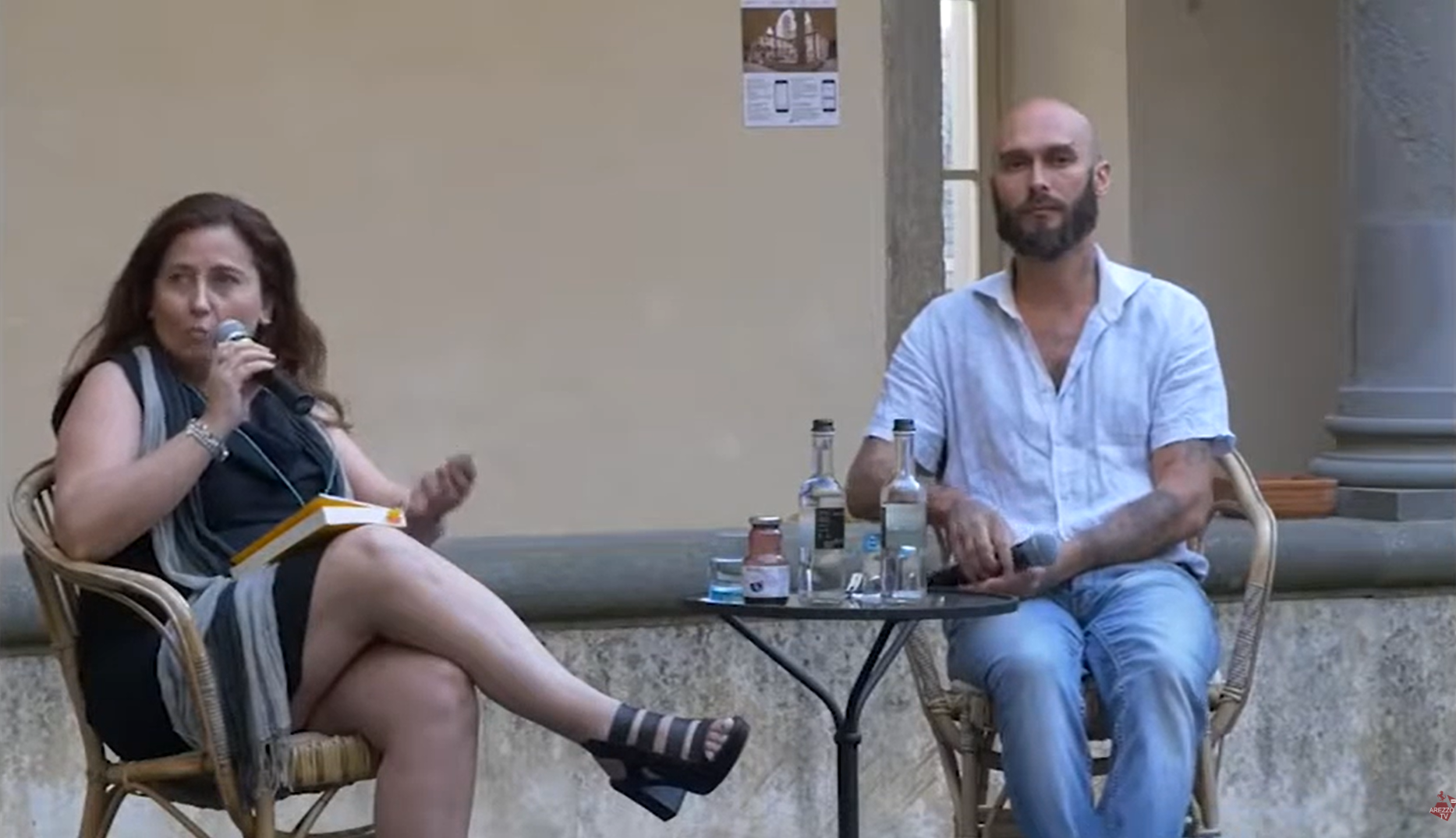
Lilin at the 5th Cortona Mix Festival, July 2016

Lilin moved to Italy in 2003 or 2004. Prior to this, he states that he had been a vagrant travelling throughout Europe, at one point becoming romantically involved with a neo-Nazi in Germany "who was proud to be the granddaughter of an SS officer". He then went to the United Kingdom, but left the country after using a knife during a brawl. Per his narrative, he subsequently moved to Northern Ireland and started a relationship with a woman whose family had ties to the IRA.

He says he had originally intended to settle in Ireland to work as a fisherman, but was tricked into going to Italy by his mother, who lied about having cancer. He claims that, from 2005, he spent two years working for a Vatican-affiliated security company infiltrating Satanic cults, during which he claims to have uncovered a child sex ring operating in Europe and Russia, and thwarted the summoning of a Swiss Satanic cult leader to a Turin nightclub. He also credits himself with uncovering the presence of MS-13 in Turin. He further claims that he once suffered an assassination attempt in Turin by Islamic radicals who planted a bomb under his car.

He briefly lived as an illegal immigrant after his residence permit expired. His situation remained precarious until he was discovered in 2005 by playwright Franco Collimato of the Libre cultural association in Turin. He acted as a consultant for Collimato's 2006 play AK, il Canto dei Catari (AK: Song of the Cathars), coaching the actors during action sequences.

=== Literary career ===
==== Siberian Education ====
In 2005, while working for Libre, Lilin was asked to write stories for the association's website. His writings were forwarded to the Einaudi publishing house by playwright Giorgio Cattaneo, and he was commissioned to write what would become Siberian Education.

The novel is said to be based on Lilin's childhood experiences among exiled Siberian gangsters in Transnistria. It quickly became a bestseller in Italy, ranking number 10 on la Repubblica's list of top ten most sold books in April 2009. By July of that year, the book had sold over 50,000 copies domestically and had been published in 40 countries by 2011. The novel was adapted into a film directed by Gabriele Salvatores in 2013. Lilin helped write the screenplay, and applied tattoos on John Malkovich in order to portray his character. A stage adaptation followed shortly after.

===== Praise =====
Roberto Saviano wrote a positive review in la Repubblica, which Lilin credits with popularising the novel. Saviano commented that "in order to read this book, you must ready yourself to forget the categories of good and evil as you know them and cast aside your feelings as they've been formed in your soul. You just have to read it, period". Irvine Welsh, writing for The Guardian, praised Lilin for writing "not so much [...] a crime biography as a detailed account of an amazing culture, one that, in the face of globalisation, is sadly disappearing in front of us. I say sadly because, despite the often extreme violence and the fetishism of knives and guns inherent in the Siberian criminal culture, it operates on higher principles than the mainstream ones pursued in the west". Richard Poplak of the National Post summarised the novel as "a bracing, true-crime curiosity that should interest those who want their understanding of the region massively shaken up, or their knowledge of knife fighting thoroughly upgraded".

===== Skepticism =====
Lilin draws on the vast literature about the prison life and criminal underworld of Russia to create a sect whose putative "Siberian" origin is fantastical and whose traditions, practices and language are lifted from well-known Soviet and post-Soviet prison-based criminal fraternities [...]. Lilin's furious reactions to those who cast doubt on his criminal credentials can best be explained by the fact that some elements of the book do reflect his own experience while most of the rest is widely known in Russia to readers of quasi-fictional crime tales by Valery Karyshev and to viewers of the prison-based TV series Zona.

— Federico Varese

The factual accuracy of the novel was disputed by numerous journalists and historians. In 2009, La Stampa journalist Anna Zafesova went to Bender to investigate the claims made in the book on Siberian gang culture, and interviewed several old acquaintances of Lilin, as well as historians of the region, who concurred that the story was an invention. Historian Donald Rayfield called the book "a fantasist's ravings", and both he and criminologist Federico Varese drew attention to Lilin's false claim that the Russian cant language, Fenya, was derived from a native Siberian language. Varese further noted how the novel treats the fictional Benya Krik as a historical character, and wrote that while the scenes depicting the brutality of prison life may have been based on Lilin's personal experiences, the rest of the novel was probably derivative of prior books and TV series. Anthropologist Michael Bobick criticised the novel's portrayal of the city of Bender as being particularly crime-ridden, and accused Lilin of "[peddling] Westerners their own deepest, darkest fears about Transdniester and Russia" and of having "found [...] a captive audience uninterested in the facts". Internet forums frequented by Bender residents show reactions to the novel that Bobick states "range from disbelief and laughter to anger and outrage at the author's hollow attempts to besmirch his native city. Perhaps tellingly, some express astonishment that he was capable of pulling such a fast one on westerners." Zakhar Prilepin compared the premise of the novel to a contemporary German author writing about "a squadron of former SS officers hiding in the forests outside Berlin, listening to Wagner with their children and grandchildren, reading aloud from the works of Junge and banging on tin drums as they rob passing trains".

Lilin later claimed the novel is not an autobiography, being instead a collection of stories recollected from his childhood and the narratives of elders. Nevertheless, it has been presented as autobiographical on the covers of both the original and German editions. Per his interview with Elena Chernenko, Lilin stated that he had no control over how the novel was labeled, and that it was done for marketing purposes. Federico Varese noted that the English translation includes a disclaimer warning that "certain episodes are imaginative recreation", though this is absent in the original Italian version. When confronted about these issues by Piero Chiambretti and Paolo Bianchi on a 2010 episode of the Chiambretti Night variety show, Lilin proceeded to threaten them.

The novel has never been translated into Lilin's native Russian or any other language spoken in Bender or Tiraspol. Efim Shuman of Deutsche Welle wrote of allegations that Lilin had forbidden the sale of rights to sell his book in Russia and the former USSR over fears of its factual inaccuracies being exposed, while Chernenko, during her interview with him, mentioned a rumour that Lilin had prohibited the novel's translation for fear of reprisals by Russian and Moldovan criminal gangs. Lilin has denied these allegations, stating that he had approached two Russian publishing houses, but refused to sell the rights to his material because they wanted to present the novel as a denunciation of criminality and include a preface written by a convicted Russian felon.

==== Free Fall ====
In 2010, Lilin released Free Fall: A Sniper's Story from Chechnya , a sequel to Siberian Education set during the Second Chechen War. Per an interview with Francesca Colletti, Lilin's aim in writing the sequel was to give a realistic, non-partisan depiction of living through a war.

The novel was widely reported as autobiographical, but was criticized for including numerous factual innaccuracies relating to warfare and the Chechen wars in general. Oliver Bullough, in a 2011 interview with Lilin, wrote that "it contains tales so unlikely that most editors would surely have spotted them as false, such as when Lilin finds a Chechen with a rifle loaded with hyper-accurate bullets filled with liquid mercury. Such an idea is nonsense since the liquid would shift in flight and render them useless". He also drew attention to a scene where an urban battle resulted in the loss of 13 lieutenant-colonels. Tim Kucharewski notes how the novel perpetuates the myth of anti-personnel mines being deliberately disguised as toys or boxes of crayons, which Lilin claims were manufactured in San Marino and used extensively by Chechen fighters. Kucharewski points out how the legend originated during the Soviet–Afghan War, but that it made even less sense in the context of the Chechen wars:

What would be the tactical motivation for the Chechens to conceal mines in toy-shapes on their home turf when confronting Russian soldiers as their only opponent? If the notion is disregarded that this had been done to seduce the inner child of potentially looting Russian conscript or contract soldiers, one is hard-pressed to find an explanation. Using underage "child soldiers" or bringing [one's] "own" civilians into the combat zones as human shields are among the few war crimes that have never been alleged against the Russian federation during these wars. The only persons that these alleged toy mines could actually bait, would be Chechen children. Therefore, from any perspective other than one claiming that these Chechens were "barbarian" "bandits" that for some sadistic reason intended to kill or maim their own side's infants and children, the old yarn of the toy mine seems even less credible here than in other wars. Yet, Nicolai Lilin indeed stated this claim, in one of the more implausible paragraphs within the text, of which there is certainly no shortage.

During his interview with Bullough, Lilin denied the novel was a memoir and stated that it was actually based on the experiences of a fellow soldier rather than his own. In 2018, he said that Free Fall was the most fictionalised of his works and that he had deliberately omitted the names of locations and soldiers in order to protect his former comrades-in-arms. Free Fall was the last of Lilin's books to be translated into English.

==== Other works ====
In 2012, he released Storie sulla pelle, a novel in which tattoos act as a metaphor for the evolution of the modern world. He released Il serpente di Dio in 2014, a novel set in the Caucasus regarding the peaceful coexistence of Christian and Muslim communities. In his 2016 novel Spy story love story, Lilin narrated the stories of characters living through the upheavals following the dissolution of the Soviet Union. In 2022, Lilin released Ucraina. La vera storia ("Ukraine: The True Story").

=== Other ventures ===
Lilin claims to be a "kolshik" ("piercer", a slang term for "tattooer", from the Russian word kolot, "to pierce"), a hereditary title given to Siberian tattoo artists who act as "psychologist, judge or confessor" to those they mark. He has stated that he first began tattooing at the age of eight and that he was mentored in the art of traditional Siberian tattooing while serving time in a Russian juvenile prison. In 2013, Lilin opened a tattoo parlour in Solesino called Il Marchiaturificio, opening another branch in Milan in 2017. Belgian footballer Radja Nainggolan and Italian rapper Emis Killa were among his clients.

In 2010 he founded the Pro Patria Italia sports association, whose membership included military veterans and law enforcement officers. A year later, he founded Kolima, a venue for aspiring young artists.

In 2013 he hosted the Italian version of Mankind: The Story of All of Us on Italia 1. Three years later, he hosted the second season of 60 Days In.

He has collaborated with Maserin and Paolo Pinna in designing knives, and released teaching material for Tadpoles Tactics. He has also written articles for l'Espresso, la Repubblica, and TgCom24.

== Views and controversies ==
=== Politics ===
While describing himself as apolitical, Lilin stated during a 2024 interview with the Huffington Post that his values are leftist but "not as they are defined in Italy", and that he is "for better or for worse, a product of the Soviet system".

While previously he supported the European Union, in particular over its assistance to Bulgaria, he later praised Italian right-wing youths for advocating for the withdrawal of Italy from the EU. In September 2009, Lilin attracted criticism for having presented his debut novel at a CasaPound conference centre. In 2021, Lilin became a Green Europe candidate in the Milan municipal election, but dropped out after his prior links to CasaPound and members of the neo-Nazi group Lealtà Azione were brought up on social media.

His views have been described as neo-Eurasianist. In a 2014 opinion piece, he called Eurasianism a "worthy and logical alternative to American dominion", and stated in 2021 that he would be prepared to vote for the right-wing Lega party if it mended diplomatic relations with Russia.

During the COVID-19 pandemic in Italy, Lilin spoke out against mandatory vaccinations and the EU Digital COVID Certificate. In 2024, Lilin became a candidate for Peace Land Dignity during the 2024 European Parliament election in Italy. He got 2,300 votes from the North-West Italian constituency, but the list did not go over 2.08%, falling short of the 4% required for the electoral threshold.

=== Russia and Putin ===
Lilin was initially critical of Vladimir Putin and his administration. In a series of interviews and writings during the late 2000s and early 2010s, Lilin denounced the Second Chechen War, the law "On Protecting Children from Information Harmful to Their Health and Development", the beating of Oleg Kashin and the murder of Russian journalists. In 2012, he accused many Russian politicians of having earned their fortunes by enabling the production of child pornography for Western consumption since the 1990s. He further blamed Putin for the 1999 Russian apartment bombings, the 2010 Moscow Metro bombings and the Domodedovo International Airport bombing, and voiced support for the 2011–2013 Russian protests. In a 2013 interview with la Repubblica, Lilin stated:

I am appalled by how things are going with Putin, his homophobic laws, the censorship, pedophilia used as a criminal means of earning money. Western-style corruption has taken over, which is why Putin and Berlusconi are such friends, and even look like each other: both of them have undergone plastic surgery to look younger, but only Satan never ages. They are demons. [...] I no longer have the stomach to live in such a country, where the only way out left is suicide. [...] We need a new revolution, of ideas, not weapons.

After the Russian annexation of Crimea, Lilin deleted his previous critical posts and began expressing views defending Russia's conduct. In a 2014 interview, he stated that Putin's negative reputation in Italy was based on distortions created by "people who support the Atlanticist bloc". In a 2020 interview with il Giornale, Lilin expressed the view that "true" Russians desired a tsar and that Putin was fulfilling their wish. When asked a year later whether or not he considered Putin a dictator, Lilin answered: "Sure he is, according to the modern political definition of dictatorship. But we all live in dictatorial systems today, everywhere". Regarding the 2022 Russian invasion of Ukraine, Lilin has said:

[...] Russia has never started colonial wars or [wars] to expand its territory. [...] Russians don't want to invade anyone. The only reason they wage war is to ensure the integrity of their borders. That's why Putin has sent the army to Ukraine, because NATO has been doing military activities there since 1998, threatening Russia's borders. Saying that Putin wants to invade Poland and the Baltic states is nonsense. Putin wants to live in peace, not have a NATO pistol aimed at his face.

In 2019, while commenting on the alleged financial dealings between United Russia and the Italian Lega party, Lilin compared the situation of Russians living in Italy to that of Jews in Nazi Germany. He is an "honorary partner" of Lombardia Russia, an association linked to Lega whose aims include "spreading Russian political ideas" in Italy.

=== Anti-Ukrainian views ===
After the Revolution of Dignity, Lilin made extensive allegations of genocide in Donbas and of the presumed Nazism of Ukrainians. Lilin denies Ukrainian statehood, declaring that Ukraine is Russian and refers to the Russian-occupied territories of eastern Ukraine as "Novorossiya". He believes that the 2014 Revolution was a foreign-backed coup and that America is using Ukraine to prevent Europe from forming closer ties with Russia and China. In a 2014 opinion piece on L'Espresso regarding the Donbas War, Lilin wrote:

To avoid further deaths and douse the fire of this civil war, Ukraine must cease to exist as a State. The government, law enforcement and the army which have stained themselves with crimes against humanity must be arrested and tried for their responsibility. NATO should be dissolved immediately, seeing as the bloc of nations comprising the Warsaw Pact hasn't existed for more than two decades. What's needed is a military intervention by the UN to disarm both sides involved in this war. The criminal Nazis of Kiev, their Washington collaborators and advisors should be brought before the International Court of Justice in Hague and judged with all the severity that the law allows. Only this way and only from that point on will true and coherent news start arriving from that scarred nation: only then will the world be able to breathe freely.

In a review of Lilin's Ucraina. La vera storia, Adriano Sofri criticised the book for promoting the idea that Ukrainian national identity was invented by Poland in an effort to destabilise the Russian Empire, minimising the significance of the Holodomor, and completely ignoring the Executed Renaissance. In a 2022 interview with Il Piccolo, Lilin alleged that Ukraine was involved in the death of Akhmad Kadyrov. During his candidacy for Peace Land Dignity in 2024, Lilin's only policy position was to stop arms shipments to Ukraine. He has been noted to block Ukrainian journalists attempting to reach out to him, stating on his Facebook page: "Whoever supports the Kiev regime doesn't deserve a debate".

=== Conspiracy theories ===
He has spread conspiracy theories on White Tights, 9/11, the assassination of Anna Politkovskaya, Malaysia Airlines Flight 17, the assassination of Boris Nemtsov, the 2023 Hamas-led attack on Israel, and the Crocus City Hall attack, holding the West and its allies responsible for some or minimising Russian involvement in others. He has also spread conspiracy theories on George Soros, in particular blaming him for the exclusion of Russia from the 2018 Winter Olympics.

During a conversation with Russian writer Aleksandr Garros, Lilin revealed that he believed in the Jewish war conspiracy theory, and that he had been influenced in this belief by Licio Gelli. In November 2024, he claimed that the Russo-Ukrainian war was a plot formulated by BlackRock to depopulate Ukraine of Slavs and replace them with Jewish settlers.

In a 2011 interview, Lilin alleged that some members of the Russian government and ex-KGB servicemen were members of the "Holy Trinity", a group which includes members of "Black Seed", a criminal organisation originally created by the Soviets which he described as "the largest and most powerful community in the Russian criminal world".

While initially critical of Russia's actions during the Second Chechen War, stating once that he sympathised with the Chechen rebels and blamed Putin for starting the conflict, in 2014 he repeatedly expressed the belief that the war had been initiated by the United States on behalf of oil companies in order to gain control of the Caspian Sea and thus dominate the Caucasus and Iran, and that Russian forces during the war were fighting side by side with the Chechens against CIA-trained terrorists given safe passage into Russia by Georgia. He has said that Georgia, which he accuses of fomenting Wahhabism in the region, provided American-made monitoring devices to the Chechen rebels, and has also asserted that he had killed several Chechen fighters carrying American passports.

He claimed that Anna Politkovskaya had been "bought" by Russian opposition leader Boris Berezovsky, and that it was a "documented fact" that her assassination had been committed by American-paid wahhabists attempting to prevent her from exposing links between wahhabists and corrupt Russian military commanders. Regarding Berezovsky, Lilin has stated that he had orchestrated the First Chechen War and that his death was an assassination by the FSB. He described murdered opposition leader Boris Nemtsov as "obsessed with pussy" and alleged that he had been killed by the husband of one of his lovers.

On 9 July 2014, Lilin wrote that the promotion of LGBT rights in Ukraine since the 2014 Revolution is a ploy to mask the Kyiv government's true nature from westerners, comparing it to the USA's promotion of far-right regimes under the guise of spreading democracy during the Cold War.

He believes that the Russian-backed side of the Transnistria War was fighting foreign mercenaries "from all over the world", including Hungary, Germany and the Baltic states, rather than the Moldovan army, claiming once that an acquaintance of his had been killed during the war by a 25 year old female sniper from Estonia.

=== Disinformation ===
On 9 July 2014, Lilin wrote an article in which he included a photograph allegedly showing a Ukrainian government building displaying the Ukrainian flag flying alongside a Nazi one. The image was later shown to have been a production still from the Russian film Match. Later that year, he shared an article from the German conspiracist website Wahrheit fuer Deutschland claiming that a Ukrainian pilot had confessed to having shot down Malaysia Airlines Flight 17. The website subsequently specified that the source of the information was a satire page.

In 2015, during the Greta Ramelli and Vanessa Marzullo kidnapping crisis, Lilin posted a photo on his Facebook page of an armed woman he claimed to be Marzullo working for her terrorist captors. The subject of the photo was later revealed to be a Kurdish Peshmerga fighter. Later that year, he shared an article from Imola Oggi stating that the Iraqi armed forces had shot down two British planes carrying armaments for ISIS. He deleted the post after a backlash, but posted the same story from the Fars News Agency.

In 2023, he posted a video on his YouTube channel claiming that a Ukrainian war veteran in Ternopil had murdered his wife and children after mistaking a French flag on an inflatable castle they were using for a Russian one, providing no source for the information. In September of that year, Lilin spread the Russian-fabricated allegation that Human Rights Watch had accused Ukraine of using cluster munitions against civilians.

In the aftermath of the Crocus City Hall attack, Lilin's Twitter account was briefly suspended after having shared a video from the Russian talk show 60 Minut showing a deepfake depiction of Ukrainian politician Oleksiy Danilov claiming Ukraine's responsibility for the attack, and posting a tweet saying that one of the attackers had a Ukrainian passport. After the 8 July 2024 Russian strikes on Ukraine, Lilin posted a video on his YouTube channel claiming that the missile that struck the Okhmatdyt children's hospital was American. On 10 July 2024, Lilin shared a video on his Telegram channel claiming that Joe Biden had committed adultery with the wife of Jens Stoltenberg. In November of that year, Lilin spread debunked allegations that The Coca-Cola Company was profiting over the Russo-Ukrainian war by furnishing mobile morgues to the Ukrainians.

On 7 November 2025, Lilin shared a video he claimed showed EU-funded Ukrainian "Nazi-Zionists" assaulting an Orthodox church during an anti-Christian persecution. The video, in fact, showed pro-Russian rioters of the Moscow Patriarchate storming Saint Michael's Cathedral in Cherkasy and assaulting Ukrainian supporters of the Orthodox Church of Ukraine with fire extinguishers and tear gas. In December of that year, he falsely claimed that Ukrainian major general Andrii Hnatov was wearing the emblem of the Dirlewanger Brigade.

=== Threats and legal issues ===
On 19 August 2017, Lilin posted a tweet accusing the then President of the Italian Chamber of Deputies Laura Boldrini of being "friends" with the perpetrators of the 2017 Barcelona attacks. In subsequent tweets, he claimed that the post was in response to Boldrini's meeting with far-right Ukrainian politician Andriy Parubiy, whom Lilin accused of being in league with Islamic terrorists. Boldrini, after initially ignoring the tweet, sued Lilin for libel after he had given subsequent interviews claiming that she supported Nazis and ISIS.

On 9 August 2024, Lilin uploaded a video on his YouTube channel in which he claimed that his Italian passport had been confiscated and that he had "escaped" Italy on account of legal inquiries and of being declared a Russian foreign agent. An investigation into Lilin's finances by the Italian UIF (Unità di Informazione Finanziaria) found that he had been receiving substantial undeclared cash payments over a two year period, 70% of which from untraceable sources paid through Russian cryptocurrency channels.

On 19 August 2024, it was announced by Tommaso Foti that Brothers of Italy would open a parliamentary inquiry into death threats Lilin posted on his YouTube channel against journalists Stefania Battistini and Simone Traini for their coverage of the August 2024 Kursk Oblast incursion. In October 2025, Lilin was summoned directly to the Milan Courthouse to stand trial, bypassing a preliminary hearing.

During the "Voices from the Donbass" conference in Genoa on 1 March 2025, Lilin attracted media attention for expressing anger over a comedy sketch by Luca Bizzarri and Paolo Kessisoglu which mocked pro-Kremlin Italian journalist Vincenzo Lorusso, stating "I get it, the jokes, the satire, I do them too, but when I see two bored, useless, intellectually limited characters ... who mock those who report real information from the war, I feel like smashing both of their skulls". Bizzarri would later express disappointment that no politicians denounced Lilin's words.

== Personal life ==
Lilin has two daughters from different women. In 2022, he was in a relationship with a Milan-based woman from his native Bender who owns a cosmetics company. In 2023 he started living in Saudi Arabia with an Italian woman associated with Red Sea Global. He is a practising Catholic.

== Bibliography ==
=== Novels ===
- Lilin, Nicolai (2009). Educazione siberiana (in Italian). Einaudi. ISBN 978-8806195526.
  - Lilin, Nicolai (2011). Siberian Education: Growing up in a Criminal Underworld. Canongate Books. ISBN 9781847679338.
- Lilin, Nicolai (2010). Caduta libera (in Italian). Einaudi. ISBN 978-8806200633.
  - Lilin, Nicolai (2011). Free Fall: A Sniper's Story from Chechnya. Canongate Books. ISBN 978-1847679710.
- Lilin, Nicolai (2011). Il respiro del buio [Breath of Darkness] (in Italian). Einaudi. ISBN 978-8806208899.
- Lilin, Nicolai (2014). Il serpente di Dio [The Serpent of God] (in Italian). Einaudi. ISBN 978-8806218898.
- Lilin, Nicolai (2016). Spy story love story (in Italian). Einaudi. ISBN 978-8806229559.
- Lilin, Nicolai (2018). Il marchio ribelle [The Rebel Mark] (in Italian). Einaudi. ISBN 978-8806235062.
- Lilin, Nicolai (2019). La leggenda della tigre [Legend of the Tiger] (in Italian). Einaudi. ISBN 978-8806237264.

=== Short story collections ===
- Lilin, Nicolai (2012). Storie sulla pelle [Stories on the Skin] (in Italian). Einaudi. ISBN 978-8806230210.
- Lilin, Nicolai (2017). Favole fuorilegge [Outlaw Fairy Tales] (in Italian). Einaudi. ISBN 978-8806195533.
- Lilin, Nicolai (2021). Le fiabe della terra addormentata [Tales of the Sleeping Land] (in Italian). Mondadori Electa Junior. ISBN 978-8891833501.

=== Biographies ===
- Lilin, Nicolai (2020). Putin. L'ultimo zar [Putin: The Last Tsar] (in Italian). Piemme. ISBN 978-8855447331.
- Lilin, Nicolai (2024). Rasputin. L'angelo dell'apocalisse [Rasputin: The Angel of the Apocalypse] (in Italian). Piemme. ISBN 978-8856693829.
- Lilin, Nicolai (2025). Putin atto secondo [Putin: Act II] (in Italian). Piemme. ISBN 1223800628.

=== Non-fiction ===
- Lilin, Nicolai (2015). Un tappeto di boschi selvaggi [A Carpet of Wild Woods] (in Italian). Rizzoli. ISBN 978-8817083713.
- Lilin, Nicolai (2019). Criminal Tattoos vol 1 (in Italian). Il Randagio Edizioni. ISBN 978-8894499506.
- Lilin, Nicolai (2022). Ucraina. La vera storia [Ukraine: The True Story] (in Italian). Piemme. ISBN 978-8856689631.
- Lilin, Nicolai (2023). La guerra e l'odio. Le radici profonde del conflitto tra Russia e Ucraina [War and Hate: The Deep Roots of the Russo-Ukrainian Conflict] (in Italian). Piemme. ISBN 978-8856687699.
