= Robert Kozma =

Robert Kozma may refer to:

- Robert Kozma (politician) (born 1983), Serbian politician, journalist, and a member of the National Assembly
- Robert Kozma (professor), American professor of mathematics at the University of Memphis
