= Alexander Mikhailovich Golitsyn =

Russian prince (1718–1783)

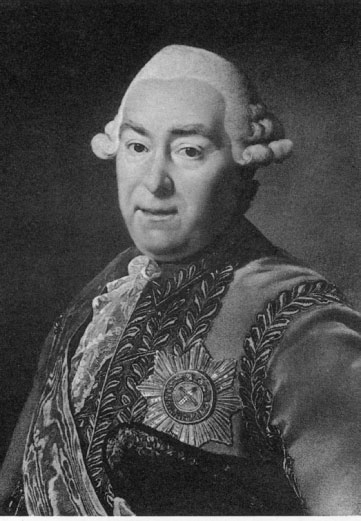

Governor of Saint Petersburg Governorate
- In office 1780–1783
- Military career
- Branch: Imperial Russian Army
- Battles / wars: Seven Years' War; Battle of Kunersdorf; Russo-Turkish War (1768–1774); Siege of Hotin; Battle of Pășcăuți; Battle of Babșîn

Prince Alexander Mikhailovich Golitsyn (Russian: Алекса́ндр Миха́йлович Голи́цын; 17 November 1718 – 8 October 1783) was a Russian prince of the House of Golitsyn and field marshal. He was the General Governor of Saint Petersburg Governorate in 1780 to 1783.

== Life ==
=== Early life ===
As was traditional for noble families, Golitsyn's name was inscribed as a captain on the list of the Life Guards while still a child. He lost his father aged 13. The family was then out of favour with empress Anna of Russia and so Alexander could not count on high patronage, so went to spend 17 years in Austria, where he fought in the Austrian army and gained the notice of Prince Eugene of Savoy. On his return to Russia in 1740 Alexander was sent to Constantinople in the entourage of ambassador A. Rumyantsev, but soon received a new assignment, as Russian Minister Plenipotentiary to the Elector of Saxony at Dresden.

=== Seven Years' War ===
Elizabeth of Russia came to the throne at the end of 1741 and the Golitsyn family returned to royal favour. During her reign Alexander successfully climbed the military and diplomatic career ladder and by 1744 was already at the rank of lieutenant general. In 1757 he was appointed to a command in the army fighting Prussia in the Seven Years' War. In 1758 he distinguished himself by capturing Тorea and at Kunersdorf commanded the Russian left flank. Pyotr Saltykov's battleplan depended on deliberately drawing Frederick II of Prussia's troops to attack the Russian left flank, so that the enemy could then be attacked from the centre and the right flank. Golitsyn had a hard time and after a staunch defence his troops were ultimately unable to survive the Prussian infantry and cavalry onslaught and retreated, with Alexander himself wounded. Military historians later found an analogy between this situation and Bagration's troops on the Russian left flank at Borodino, who were also the main target of the enemy assault and withdrew, with Bagration fatally wounded and unable to build on his success. At Kunersdorf, however, Saltykov's battleplan was a success and Frederick lost the battle, with Golitsyn awarded the Order of Alexander Nevsky and the rank of general-in-chief by Elizabeth. At the end of the war with Prussia, he was appointed commander of Russian troops in Livonia.

=== Russo-Turkish War ===
On Catherine II of Russia's accession in 1762 Golitsyn was awarded the Order of Saint Andrew and the title of the Adjutant General. By becoming a member of the High Court Council, he used the empress's influence and his diplomatic and military knowledge. At the start of the Russo-Turkish War (1768–1774), Golitsyn was entrusted with the command of an army, with which he moved on Khotyn. Splitting 40th Corps, he did not dare assault the city and withdrew to re-supply his troops and strengthen his rearguard. In 1769 he moved on Khotyn again and began to besiege it. The arrival of fresh Turkish and Tartar troops could bolster the besieged garrison and increase Russian casualties during the final assault, so he decided to raise the siege and led the army from the Dnieper, hoping to draw the enemy garrison out into open battle on ground favourable to him. In the meantime Catherine decided to replace Golitsyn as general-in-chief with Pyotr Rumyantsev, who she hoped would act more decisively, but before Rumyantsev's arrival Golitsyn succeeded into drawing the Turkish forces onto favourable ground: Under the command of Supreme Vizier Moldavanchi, they attacked Golitsyn's force on 29 August and were defeated, losing up to 7,000 men, around 70 guns and all their baggage.

Without delay, Golitsyn's army began to pursue the enemy, capturing Khotyn on 9 September; its garrison and many residents fled, leaving the city half-empty. Golitsyn then handed the army over to Rumyantsev and returned to Saint Petersburg, where Catherine welcomed him and made him a field marshal on 20 October 1769. After the Treaty of Küçük Kaynarca Golitsyn was awarded with a diamond sword with an inscription that translated "For the purification of Moldova as far as Iaşi" and the 69th Infantry Regiment was renamed after him. The military writer Dmitri Bantysh-Kamensky recounts how Golitsyn invited Saltykov, under whom he had fought at Kunersdorf, to visit the Dormition Cathedral. As they both entered the church, nobody was inside it and Saltykov said to Golitsyn "It's as empty as Khotyn".

=== Later career ===
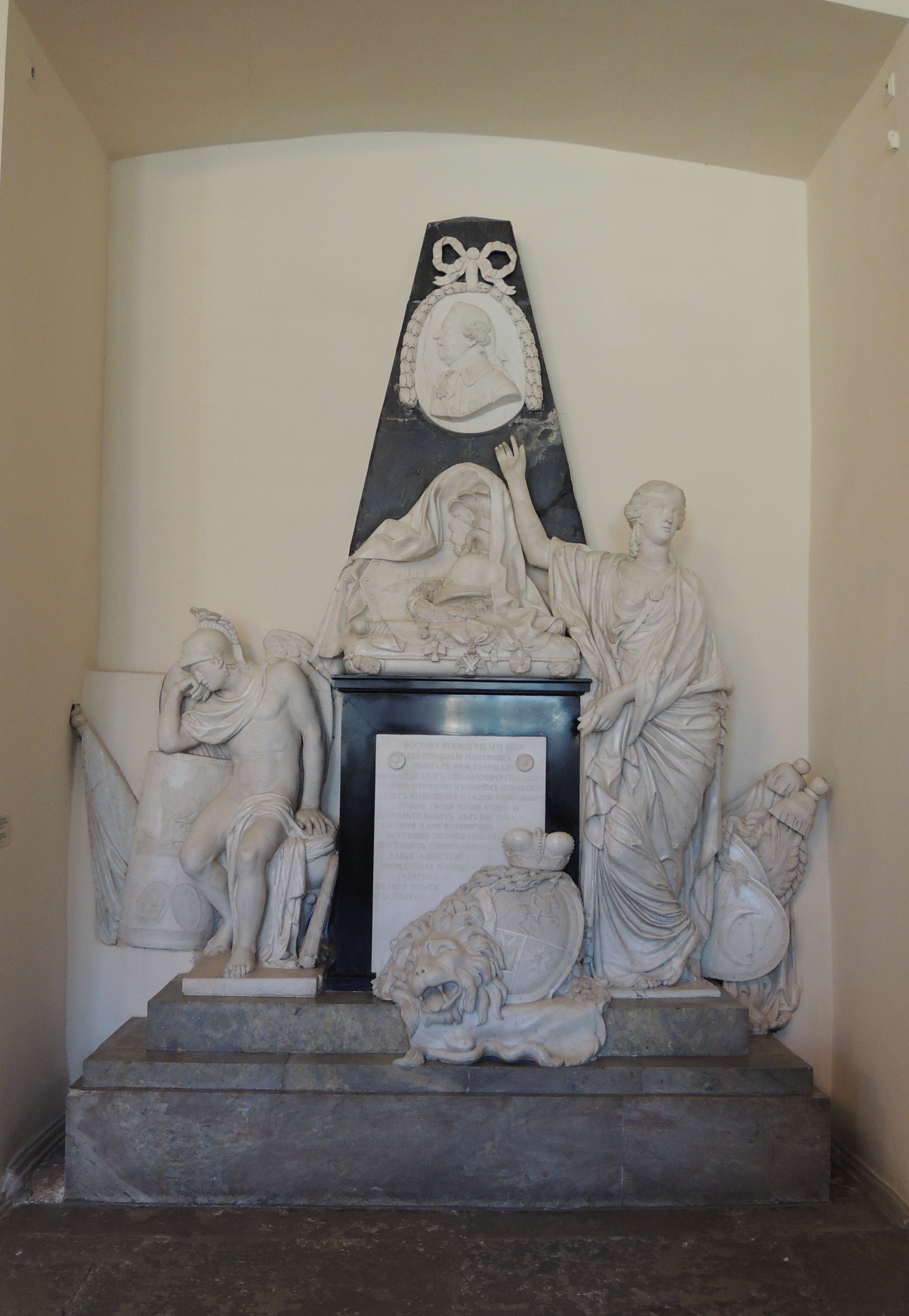
Monument to Golitsyn by Fyodor Gordeyev

After the war Golitsyn became one of the Russian statesmen who were Catherine's close confidants. In 1769 he was made a member of the board at the imperial court, in 1772 adjutant general, in December 1774 a senator, from 1775 to 1782 a member of the council for 1st Cadet Corps (as commander of the 1,777 troops stationed in Livonia), from September 1778 senior director of the revisions board and from May 1779 a position on the commission for the structure of the capital and other cities. In 1780, at Golitsyn's initiative, the nobility of the province of Saint Petersburg decided to award Catherine the title "Mother of the Fatherland", but she refused it; at the refusal, Golitsyn replied "Do not purchase empty names as the subject of my reign, but that of bringing good and calm to the fatherland".

Golitsyn was governor general of Saint Petersburg in 1775 and from 1780 to 1783 and carried out several public works to beautify it. In 1775 he completed the casting of the equestrian statue of Peter I for the city. By decree of Catherine, on April 17, 1775, a new general school was set up in the city. He also established loans schemes and put on Dana's first Russian opera, 'Cephalus and Procris'. He reformed the city's police in 1782, dividing it into 10 police districts, opened the Obukhov insane asylum and built stone storehouses on New Holland Island. On 7 August 1782 he inaugurated the Peter the Great monument on Senate Square. He was one of the eleven people awarded the ribbon of the Order of Saint Vladimir at its establishment on 22 September 1782. He died in 1783 and was buried in the Church of the Annunciation at the Alexander Nevsky Lavra.
