= Sergei Kuzmin =

Sergei Kuzmin may refer to:

- Sergei Kuzmin (footballer) (born 1967), retired Russian footballer
- Sergei Kuzmin (boxer) (born 1987), Russian boxer
- Sergey Kuzmin (cyclist), Kazakhstani cyclist
