= Kusma =

Kusma may refer to:

- Kaunan - a letter of the Runic alphabet
- Kusma, Parbat - The capital of Parbat District, Nepal.
- Kusma, Parasi - village in Nawalparasi District, Nepal
- Kusma, Tartu County, village in Peipsiääre Parish, Tartu County, Estonia
- Kusma, Võru County, village in Võru Parish, Võru County, Estonia
- Kusma, the Hungarian-language name for Cuşma village, Livezile Commune, Bistriţa-Năsăud County, Romania

== See also ==
- Cusma (disambiguation)
- Kuzma (disambiguation)
