= Sergei Kuzmin (footballer) =

Russian footballer

Personal information
- Full name: Sergei Anatolyevich Kuzmin
- Date of birth: 25 April 1967 (age 59)
- Height: 1.93 m (6 ft 4 in)
- Positions: Defender; midfielder

Youth career
- DYuSSh-8 Gorky

Senior career*
| Years | Team | Apps | (Gls) |
| 1988–1993 | FC Lokomotiv Nizhny Novgorod | 173 | (18) |
| 1994 | FC Torpedo Arzamas | 9 | (2) |
| 1995 | FC Tekstilshchik Kamyshin | 0 | (0) |
| 1995–1999 | FC Torpedo Arzamas | 126 | (7) |
| 2000–2001 | FC Spartak Yoshkar-Ola | 12 | (0) |
| 2001 | FC Torpedo-Viktoriya Nizhny Novgorod | 5 | (1) |
| 2002 | FC Lokomotiv-NN Nizhny Novgorod (amateur) | | |
| 2003–2005 | FC Kvarts Bor | | |
- * Club domestic league appearances and goals

Sergei Anatolyevich Kuzmin (Russian: Серге́й Анатольевич Кузьмин; born 25 April 1967) is a former Russian professional footballer.

== Club career ==
He made his professional debut in the Soviet Second League in 1988 for FC Lokomotiv Gorky.
