= Andrei Kuzmin =

Russian ice hockey player

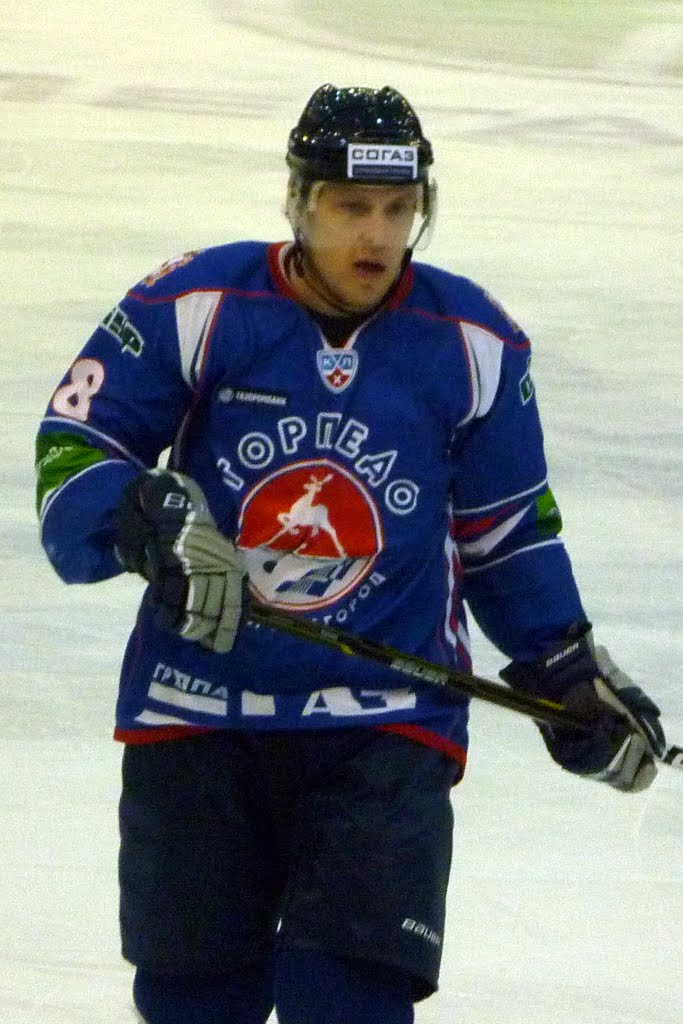
- Born: 5 April 1981 (age 43); Penza, Soviet Union
- Height: 5 ft 11 in (180 cm)
- Weight: 207 lb (94 kg; 14 st 11 lb)
- Position: Left wing
- Shot: Left
- Played for: HC Dynamo Moscow; PHC Krylya Sovetov; HC Neftekhimik Nizhnekamsk; Ak Bars Kazan; HC Spartak Moscow
- Playing career: 1998–2018

Andrei Eduardovich Kuzmin (Russian: Андрей Эдуардович Кузьмин; born 5 April 1981) is a Russian former ice hockey player. He played in the Kontinental Hockey League from 2008 to 2013, while the rest of his career, which lasted from 1998 to 2018, was mainly spent in the lower leagues of Russia.
