= Vishva Shinde =

Indian footballer (born 2003)

Personal information
- Full name: Vishva Vijay Shinde
- Date of birth: 11 July 2003 (age 23)
- Place of birth: Kolhapur, Maharashtra, India
- Position: Forward

Team information
- Current team: Indian Arrows
- Number: 27

Youth career
- Kolhapur City

Senior career*
Years	Team	Apps	(Gls)
2021–	Indian Arrows	3	(0)
- * Club domestic league appearances and goals as of 22:34, 13 March 2021 (UTC)

Vishva Vijay Shinde (born 11 July 2003) is an Indian professional footballer who plays as a forward for I-League club Indian Arrows.

== Club career ==
Born in Kolhapur, Maharashtra, Shinde began his career playing in local football tournaments in his town and within the state as well.

=== Indian Arrows ===
Prior to the 2020–21 season, Shinde was announced as part of the squad for I-League side Indian Arrows, the development team for the All India Football Federation. He made his professional debut for the club on 29 January 2021 against Chennai City, coming on as an 83rd-minute substitute as Indian Arrows lost 1–0.

== International career ==
Shinde has represented India at the under-16 level.

== Career statistics ==
As of match played 11 March 2021

Appearances and goals by club, season and competition
Club	Season	League			Cup		Continental		Total	
Club	Season	Division	Apps	Goals	Apps	Goals	Apps	Goals	Apps	Goals
Indian Arrows	2020–21	I-League	3	0	0	0	—	—	3	0
Career total			3	0	0	0	0	0	3	0
