= Kuzma Gnidash =

Kuzma Savelyevich Gnidash
- Кузьма́ Саве́льевич Гни́даш
- Born: Kuzma Savelyevich Gnidash; 17 November [O.S. 4 November] 1914 village of Salogubovka, Volchansky Uyezd, Kharkov Governorate, Russian Empire
- Died: July 19, 1944 village of Volchuni, Slonim district, Grodno region Byelorussian SSR, Soviet Union
- Military career
- Allegiance: Soviet Union
- Service years: 1936—1944
- Rank: Major
- Nickname: Kim (Russian: Ким)
- Conflicts: World War II
- Awards: Hero of the Soviet Union

Kuzma Savelyevich Gnidash Russian: Кузьма́ Саве́льевич Гни́даш (17 November [O.S. 4 November] 1914 – July 19, 1944) was a Soviet officer and intelligence officer. During the Great Patriotic War, he participated in the partisan war in Ukraine and Belarus, and was the commander of a sabotage and reconnaissance center in the Nazi rear. Hero of the Soviet Union (1945, posthumously), major.

== Life ==
He was born in the village of Salogubovka, Kharkov Governorate, Russian Empire, to a peasant family. He is Ukrainian by nationality. He received a primary education in 7 grades. In 1933, he graduated from the Priluki Automobile and Tractor School, and worked as a driver and tractor driver at the Talalaev MTS.

In 1936, Gnidash was drafted into the Red Army by the Romensky RVC of the Sumy region. He graduated from the political school (1939), the Kiev Military Tank School (1940). Member of the All-Union Communist Party (bolsheviks) since 1939.

Participant in the Polish campaign of the Red Army and the Soviet-Finnish War.

With the beginning of the Great Patriotic War, Gnidash was at the front, he met the war as a tank battalion commander. He was wounded three times, after being wounded he remained in the reserve regiment. In June 1942, he was sent behind enemy lines at the head of a reconnaissance and sabotage detachment, which operated from May 1942 in the Kyiv and Chernigov regions and in southern Belarus. Commander of a reconnaissance group behind enemy lines, officer of the RO headquarters of the 1st Belorussian Front (1943–1944).

A group of reconnaissance men under the command of Gnidash conducted reconnaissance and sabotage operations in the areas of the cities of Slutsk, Baranovichi, Kobrin, Osipovichi, Brest, in the Kyiv and Chernigov regions - 21 trains with enemy personnel and equipment were derailed, a power station was blown up, 10 steamships and 14 barges were destroyed, and a thousand enemy soldiers and officers were killed. The group regularly transmitted information about the enemy to the command headquarters, which contributed to the successful crossing of the Desna and Dnieper rivers, and the preparation and conduct of the Belorussian offensive operation. In September 1943, Gnidash's detachment joined the advancing units of the Red Army.

In December 1943, Gnidash, at the head of a reconnaissance and sabotage group, was sent to Belarus, in the Nazi rear. Gnidash transmitted the coordinates of enemy objects to Soviet aviation.

On June 19, 1944, near the city of Slonim, a group of scouts was fired upon by a detachment of Nazis. Gnidash personally killed 20 enemy soldiers, but was wounded in the leg; his comrades carried him in their arms. He ordered that he be left behind and took refuge in a dugout with the 17-year-old radio operator of the partisan group, Klara Davidyuk. However, the punitive forces' dog led them to the dugout and the partisans, not wanting to surrender, blew themselves and the Nazis who had surrounded them up with a grenade.

Gnidash's body was initially buried in the village of Bloshnya, Baranovichi Region, Belarus, and then reburied in a mass grave in the city of Slonim, Grodno Region

By decree of the Presidium of the Supreme Soviet of the USSR, Gnidash was posthumously awarded the title Hero of the Soviet Union. Gnidash was also awarded the Order of Lenin, two Orders of the Red Banner, and the medal "Partisan of the Patriotic War, First Degree".

== Books ==
- Shkadov, Ivan, ed. (1988). Герои Советского Союза: краткий биографический словарь [Heroes of the Soviet Union: A Brief Biographical Dictionary] (in Russian). Vol. 2. Moscow: Voenizdat. ISBN 5203005362.
- В путешествие по Сумщине. Харьков. 1979.
- Гриченко И. Т., Головин Н. М. Подвиг. Харьков: Прапор.
- Гусев Борис (1972). За три часа до рассвета. Ленинград.
- Подвигом прославленные. Киев: Прапор. 1985.
- Руднев С. В. (1957). Легендарный рейд. Дневник о Карпатском рейде. Письма. Ужгород.
- "2". Украинская ССР в Великой Отечественной войне 1941-1945 гг. Киев. 1975.
- Федотов А. С., Романов С. П., Сироткин М. (1963). Разведчики в тылу врага. Москва.
- Майдан Николай Авраамович (2014). Воспоминания участника Великой Отечественной войны (PDF). 50. Новосибирск: НГТУ. p. 64. ISBN 978-5-7782-2573-2.
