= Kuzma, Croatia =

Kuzma
- Village
- Location within Croatia
- Coordinates: 45°37′N 17°28′E
- Country: Croatia

Population (2011)
  - Total: 0
- Time zone: UTC+1 (CET)
  - Summer (DST): UTC+2 (CEST)

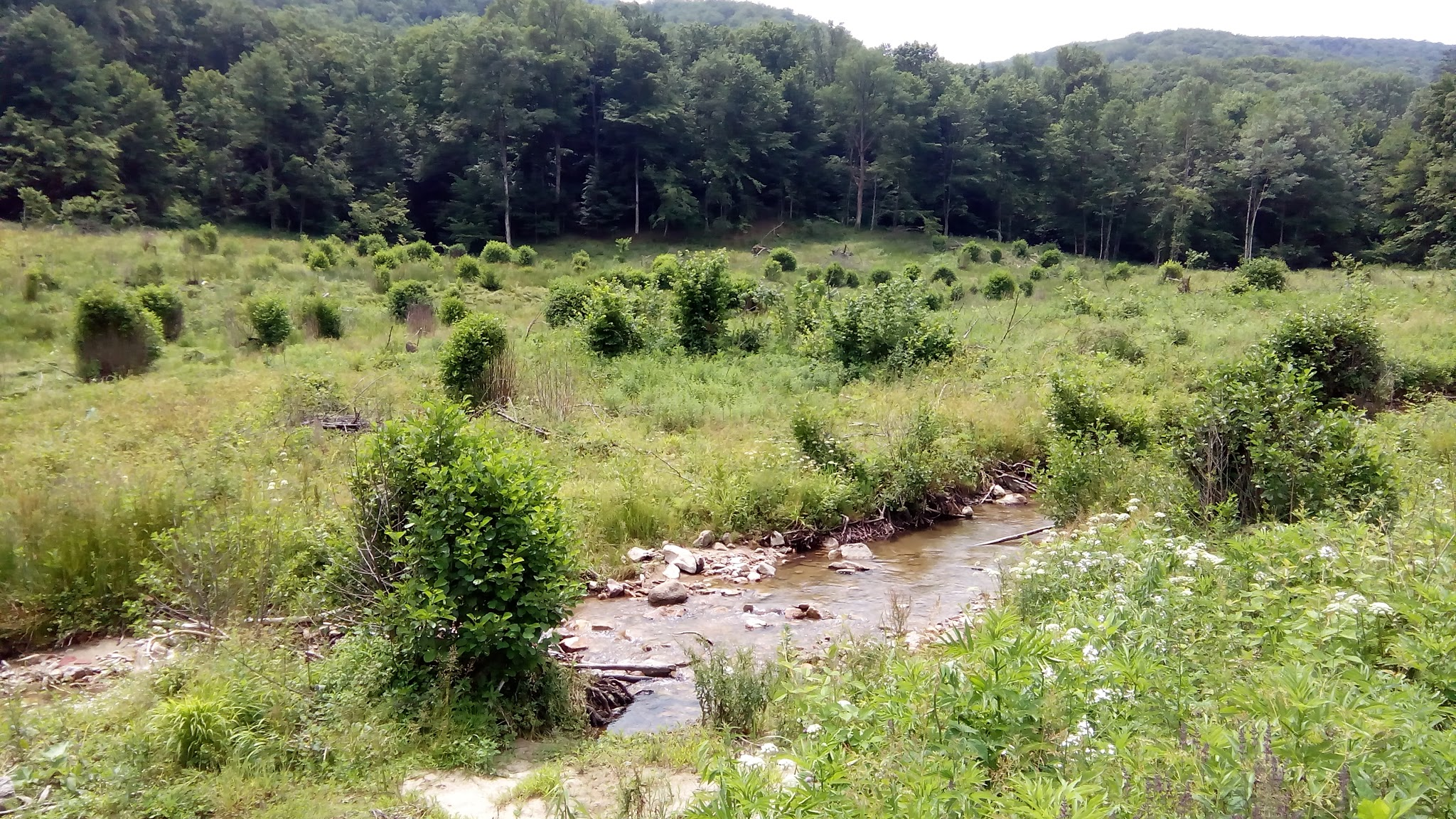

Kuzma is an uninhabited settlement in Croatia. The highest population was in 1931 when it had 295 settlers.
