= Dmitri Bantysh-Kamensky =

Russian statesman and historian

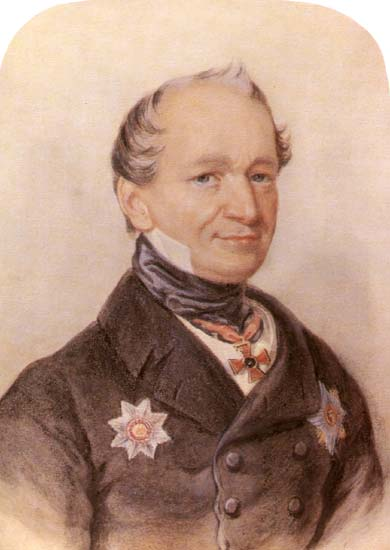
Dmitri Bantysh-Kamensky, 1850 (c).

Dmitri Nikolaevich Bantysh-Kamensky (Russian: Дми́трий Никола́евич Банты́ш-Каме́нский; 5 (16) November 1788, Moscow – January 25 (February 6) 1850, Saint Petersburg) was a Russian statesman and historian who studied under pioneering 18th-century historian G. F. Müller He served as Governor of Tobolsk Governorate between March 1825 and 20 July 1828 and then later became Governor of the Vilna Province between May 1836 and 1838. Dmitri Bantysh-Kamensky is considered the first true historian of the Cossacks.

== Biography ==
Dmitri Bantysh-Kamensky was the son of noted archivist and historian Nikolai Nikolaevich Bantysh-Kamensky. Bantysh-Kamensky who was educated at home, became a cadet in 1800 the Cadet Corps and gained a place in the Moscow archive of the Foreign College whose director was his father.

Being sent to Serbia, Bantysh-Kamensky had the opportunity to survey Ukraine and the countries lying along the way, which he described in his "Journey to Moldavia, Wallachia and Serbia" (M., 1810 ).

In 1812, Bantysh-Kamensky accompanied his father to Nizhny Novgorod, where the archive was temporarily removed. Upon his return to Moscow, Bantysh-Kamensky attended lectures at the Moscow University. Soon after the death of his father in 1814, he went to the service in St. Petersburg for the College of Foreign Affairs.

The excellent knowledge of languages opened up for him a wide field of diplomatic activity, but he did not take advantage of this, but first he became an official of special assignments, and then the ruler of the chancellery to Prince N. G. Repnin, appointed in 1816 by the military governor of Ukraine. A five-year stay here gave him the opportunity to once again indulge in his favorite archival pursuits, the fruit of which is his "History of Ukraine from joining it to the Russian state until the hetman's abolition, with a general introduction, the application of materials and portraits" (4 volumes, 1822; Tomas, Moscow, 1830; 3rd edition, 1842 )

The work undertaken on behalf of Prince Repnin, who even took an active part in the compilation of the first volume. Sources for the author were his father's handwritten work on the same subject, numerous documents of the Moscow archive, materials from the archive of the Little Russian Collegium (with the provincial government in Chernihiv), the archives of Prince Repnin and many local materials. This work, not devoid of shortcomings, for a long time remained the only whole history of Ukraine.

In March 1825, Bantysh-Kamensky was appointed governor of Tobolsk. In this position, he cared much about the improvement of the city, the improvement of the life of exiles and local aliens, contributed to the abolition of dowry among the Mansi people.

Despite, however, for such a useful activity, Bantysh-Kamensky in 1828 became a victim of a senatorial audit, for which the investigation and trial in the Court of St. Petersburg was prolonged, until 1834. With regard to these persecutions, he compiled a detailed note entitled "Shemyakin Court in the Nineteenth Century"; Part of it was printed in the Russian antiquity of 1873.

Taking advantage of his involuntary leisure, Bantysh-Kamensky again gave himself to his favorite literary pursuits. By this time belongs his " Dictionary of the memorable people of the Russian land " (5 volumes, Moscow, 1836, additions in 3 volumes, St. Petersburg, 1847 ), based on a variety of archival sources, family documents and oral reports.

In May 1836, Bantysh-Kamensky was appointed governor of the Vilna province. Here he drew attention to the improvement of charitable institutions and hospitals, the organization of cities, but in 1838 was recalled and assigned to the Ministry of Internal Affairs. Then he was a member of the council of this ministry ( 1839 ) and a member of the department of destinies ( 1810 ), and in 1841 was granted secret councilors.

During the last period of his life, Bantysh-Kamensky owned his "Biographies of Russian Generalissimo and General-Field Marshals" (4 parts, St. Petersburg, 1840 - 1841 ), for the publication of which Emperor Nicholas I granted 2000 rubles.

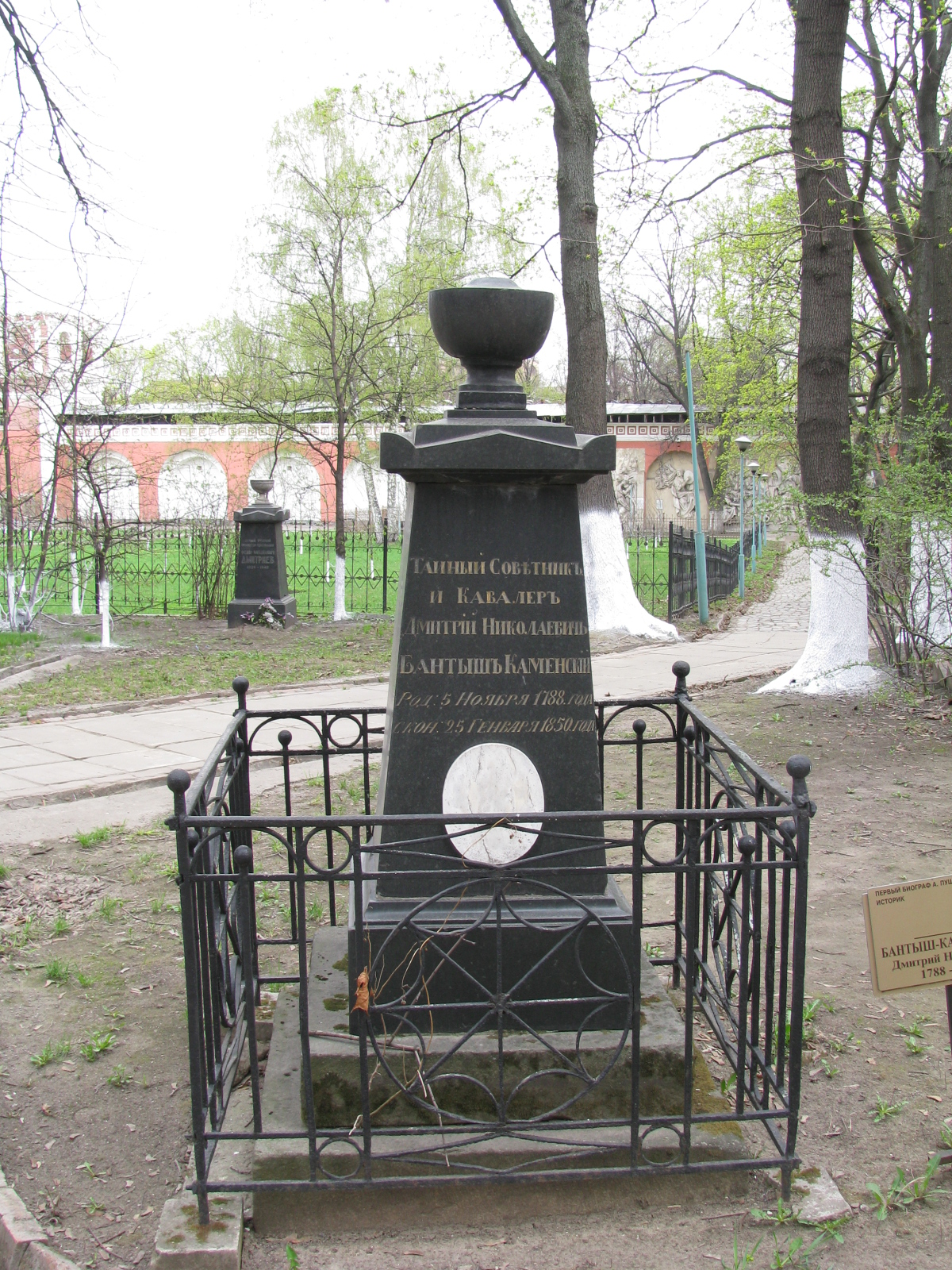
Tombstone of Dmitri Bantysh-Kamensky in the Donskoy Monastery

Bantysh-Kamensky died in Petersburg on January 26, 1850, and was buried in Moscow, within the Donskoy Monastery. He was married three times and left a significant family, but neither service nor literary works enriched him, so that to repay his debts the emperor Nikolai Pavlovich granted his estate 10,000 rubles.

== Literature ==
- Dmitry Nikolaevich, Bantysh-Kamensky (1812–1813). Деяния знаменитых полководцев и министров, служивших в царствование Государя Императора Петра Великого [Acts of famous generals and ministers who served in the reign of Emperor Peter the Greata] (in Russian). Moscow: Tip. N.S. Vsevolozhsky. : В 2 ч. — М.: Тип. Н. С. Всеволожского, 1812–1813. С 22 портретами и 2 медалями; 2 изд., Москва, 1821; франц. перевод, Москва, 1822 и 1828; париж. изд. 1826 и 1829 с портр.; англ. перевод, Лондон, 1851 без портр.
- Mikhail, Snegirev. (1818). "Жизнь Николая Николаевича Бантыш-Каменского, [Life of Nikolai Nikolayevich Bantysh-Kamensky]". memoirs.ru. RUSSIAN MEMOIRS. — М.: Тип. Имп. медико-хирургич. акад., 1818. — 79 с.
- История Малой России: 2 ч. — М.: тип. С. Селивановскаго, 1822.
- Dmitry Nikolaevich, Bantysh-Kamensky (1830). История Малой России [History of Little Russia (In Three Volumes)] (in Russian). Moscow: Tip. Seeds of Selivanovsky. : В 3 ч. — .: Тип. С. Селивановского, 1830.

  - История Малой России от водворения Славян в сей стране до уничтожения Гетманства. — 4-е изд. — Киев: Тип. И. И. Чоколова, 1903. — 653 с.

- Dmitry Nikolaevich, Bantysh-Kamensky (1836). Словарь достопамятных людей русской земли [Dictionary of memorable people of the Russian land (In Five Volumes)] (in Russian). Moscow: Tip. N.S. Vsevolozhsky. В 5 ч. — М.: Тип. Августа Семёна, 1836.

- Dmitry Nikolaevich, Bantysh-Kamensky (1836). Словарь достопамятных людей русской земли. Часть первая [Dictionary of memorable people of the Russian land. Part one]. Moscow: Тип. Августа Семена. p. 376.
- Dmitry Nikolaevich, Bantysh-Kamensky (1836). Словарь достопамятных людей русской земли. Часть вторая [Dictionary of memorable people of the Russian land. Part two]. Moscow: Tip. N.S. Vsevolozhsky. p. 432.
- Dmitry Nikolaevich, Bantysh-Kamensky (1836). Словарь достопамятных людей русской земли. Часть третья [Dictionary of memorable people of the Russian land. Part Three]. Moscow: Tip. N.S. Vsevolozhsky. p. 369.
- Dmitry Nikolaevich, Bantysh-Kamensky (1836). Словарь достопамятных людей русской земли. Часть четвертая [Dictionary of memorable people of the Russian land. Part Four]. Moscow: Tip. N.S. Vsevolozhsky. p. 372.
- Dmitry Nikolaevich, Bantysh-Kamensky (1836). Словарь достопамятных людей русской земли. Часть пятая [Dictionary of memorable people of the Russian land. Part Five]. Moscow: Tip. N.S. Vsevolozhsky. p. 375.

- Биографии российских генералиссимусов и генерал-фельдмаршалов с 48 портретами: В 3 ч. — СПб.: Тип. Третьего Департамента Министерства Государственных Имуществ, 1840.
- Источники малороссійской исторіи [Sources of Little Russian History] (напечатаны Бодянским в «Чтениях моск. общ. истории» 1858, Volume I and 1859, Volume II) и другие труды.
- Бантыш-Каменский Д. Н. Шемякин суд в XIX столетии, или ревизия Тобольской губернии. Записки Д. Н. Бантыш-Каменского. Извлечения // Русская старина, 1873. — Т. 7. — No. 6. — С. 735–784.
