= Cusma =

Cusma or CUSMA may refer to:

== Trade agreements ==
- The United States–Mexico–Canada Agreement, also referred to as the Canada–United States–Mexico Agreement (CUSMA) within Canada

== Places ==
- Cușma, a village in the commune Livezile, Bistrița-Năsăud County, Romania
- Cușma, a tributary of the river Tănase in Bistrița-Năsăud County, Romania

== People ==
- Elisa Cusma (born 1981), Italian runner

== See also ==
- Kusma (disambiguation)
- Kuzma (disambiguation)
