= Szymon Kuźma =

Polish footballer

Personal information
- Full name: Szymon Kuźma
- Date of birth: 5 September 1997 (age 29)
- Place of birth: Krynica-Zdrój, Poland
- Height: 1.77 m (5 ft 10 in)
- Position: Midfielder

Team information
- Current team: Ząbkovia Ząbki
- Number: 20

Youth career
- Sandecja Nowy Sącz

Senior career*
Years	Team	Apps	(Gls)
2014–2020	Sandecja Nowy Sącz	31	(0)
2015–2016	→ Miedź Legnica II (loan)	14	(5)
2018	→ Podhale Nowy Targ (loan)	10	(1)
2020–2023	Świt Nowy Dwór Mazowiecki	81	(12)
2023–2025	ŁKS Łomża	36	(8)
2026–	Ząbkovia Ząbki	1	(0)

International career
2013	Poland U16	2	(0)
2015	Poland U18	3	(0)
- * Club domestic league appearances and goals as of 23:47, 3 June 2026 (UTC)

Szymon Kuźma (born 5 September 1997) is a Polish professional footballer who plays as midfielder for III liga club Ząbkovia Ząbki. He is the older brother of fellow footballer Jan Kuźma.

== Honours ==
Sandecja Nowy Sącz

- I liga: 2016–17

Świt Nowy Dwór Mazowiecki

- Polish Cup (Masovia regionals): 2020–21

ŁKS Łomża

- Polish Cup (Podlasie regionals): 2024–25
