= Pyotr Shchebalsky =

Pyotr Karlovich Shchebalsky
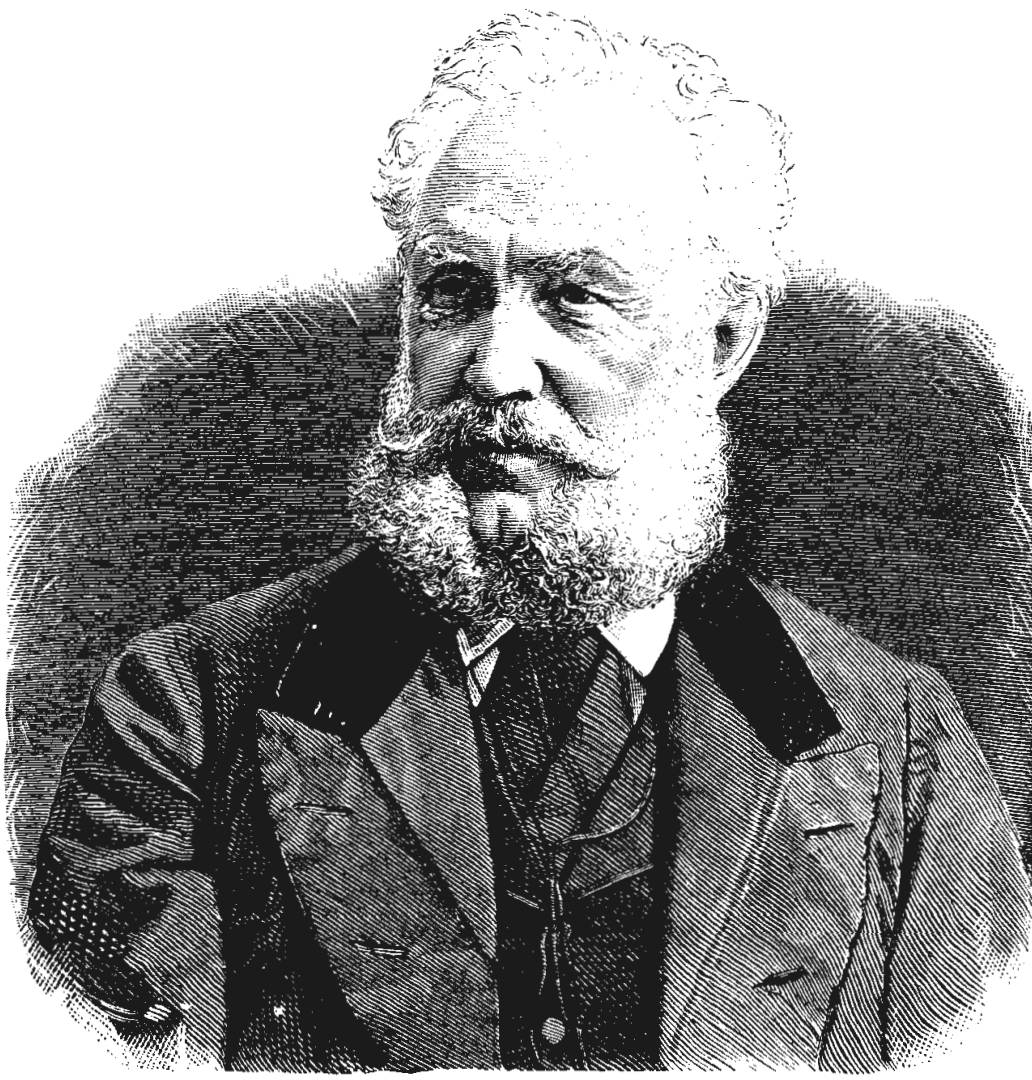
- Born: 1810; Russian Empire
- Died: 20 March 1886 (aged 75–76); Warsaw, Poland
- Occupations: Literary critic and historian, editor

Pyotr Karlovich Shchebalsky (Russian: Пётр Карлович Щебальский, 1810 – 20 March 1886) was a Russian literary critic and historian, author of comprehensive studies on the history of Russian literature, later editor of the Varshavsky Dnevnik (The Warsaw Diary) magazine.

== Biography ==
Pyotr Shchebalsky was born in 1810 into a noble Pskovian family. In 1829 he joined the Artillery college, in 1830 became a junker and after the graduation in 1834 remained at the college in the rank of praporshchik to receive the extended course of studies. In 1836–1842 he served in the Guards artillery, then, on 17 July 1842, for taking part in a duel was lowered in rank to a cannoneer and got transferred to the field artillery unit of the Caucasian grenadiers' brigade. Schebalsky took part in several major operations in Chechnya and Dagestan and was rewarded the soldier's Order of St. George. After six years of the service in the Caucasus he was reinstated in ranks and in January 1848 was returned to the Guards to join in December of the same year the Emperor's battery of His Majesty Grand Duke Mikhail Pavlovich. At the same time he took the posts of the head of the Division's school of artillery and the special class of Don's uryadniks' tutor.

In 1854 for financial reasons Shchebalsky retired from the military service and was appointed the chief of Moscow police. In 1858, now the Ministry of Education official, Shchebalsky started his career as a critic and literary historian. As the Ministry's special envoy, in the course of 4 years he was compiling the comprehensive Russian press reviews for the Tsar. At the same time, by the then Minister of Education's request, he wrote his major treatise, The History of Censorship in Russia. In those four years time Shchebalsky also wrote the series of essays that were published under the title Readings from the Russian History from the XVII Century Onwards. All the while his works on the history of Russian literature were being published in Zarya, Russky Arkhiv, but mostly in The Russian Messenger.

The last 15 years of his life Shchebalsky spent in Poland, first as a head of educational directories - first of Suwałki (from 1871), then of Warsaw (from 1875). After retirement he became the editor of Varshavsky Dnevnik (The Warsaw Diary), the only Russian newspaper in Poland which during years of his leadership became a prominent publication, both allies and opponents praising Shchebalsky's objectivity and literary talent. Pyotr Shchebalsky died in Warsaw on 20 March 1886.
