= Fyodor Gordeyev =

Russian sculptor

Fyodor Gordeyevich Gordeyev (Russian: Фёдор Гордеевич Гордеев; 1744 – 4 February 1810) was a Russian sculptor.

== Life ==
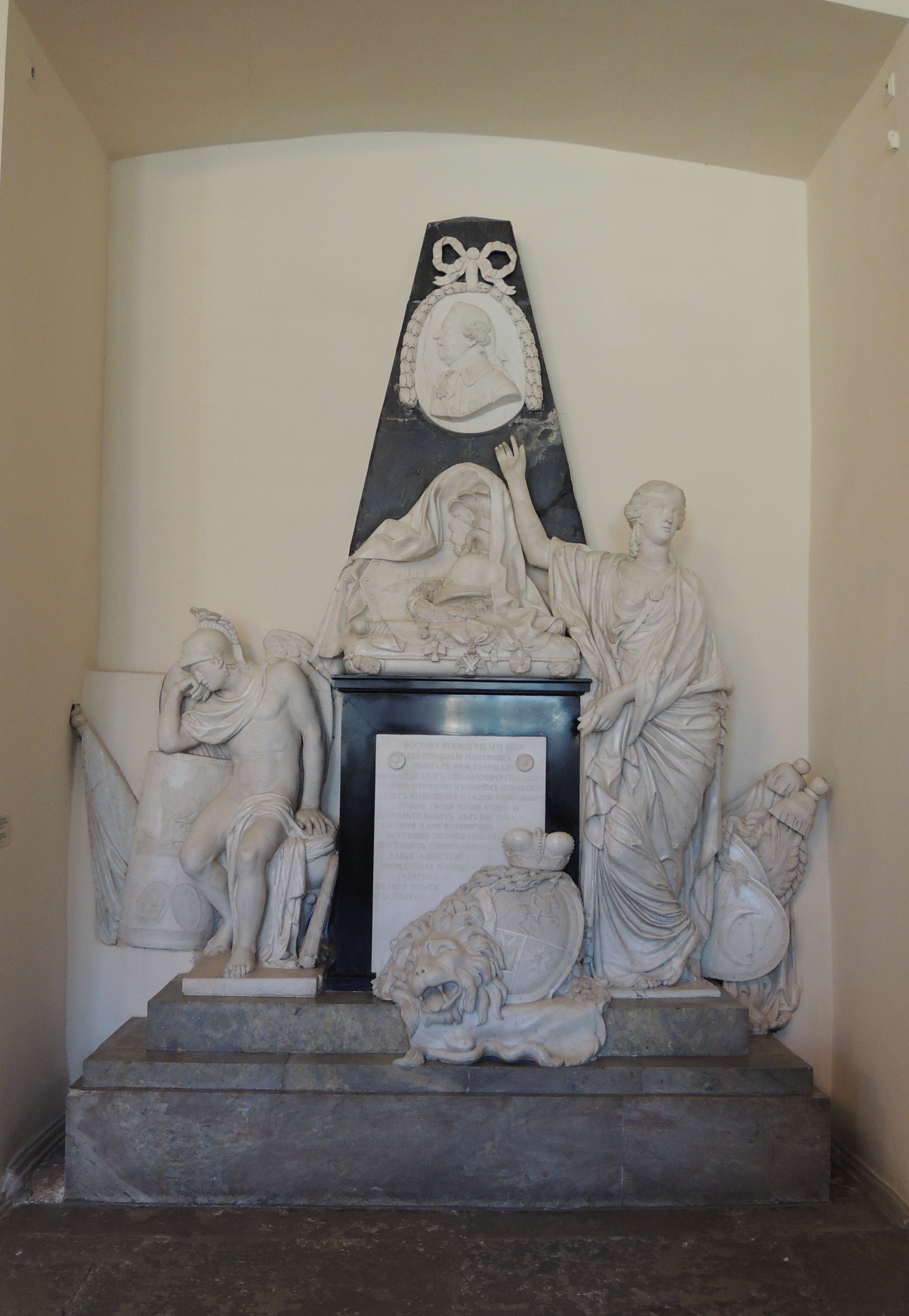
Monument to Alexander Mikhailovich Golitsyn by Gordeyev (1788)

Born in Saint Petersburg, he attended the Imperial Academy of Fine Arts in the city and then went on a study trip to Western Europe thanks to the bursary. This took him to Paris, where he studied in the studio of Jean-Baptiste Lemoyne, then Rome, where he was influenced by classical art.

After returning to Russia, he was commissioned to teach sculpture at the Academy in 1769 Around the same time he produced the noted bas-relief Mercury Entrusting Bacchus to the Nymphs (1776). In 1802 he was made rector of the Academy. Art critics came to see Gordeyev as one of the best Russian neo-classical sculptors, although his early work such as Tomb of N. M. Golicyn (1780) still included influences from the Baroque. His final works also showed traces of Baroque influence.

His most important works include Prometheus (1769), Monument to A. M. Golitsyn in Alexander Nevsky Lavra in Saint Petersburg (1788), the bas-reliefs of the Ostankino Palace in Moscow (1798), and the bas-reliefs on the tympanum of the Kazan Cathedral in Saint Petersburg (1804). He also produced portraits and history paintings. He died in St Petersburg.
