= Killian Camélé =

French footballer (born 2003)

Personal information
- Date of birth: 16 March 2003 (age 23)
- Place of birth: Saint-Louis, France
- Position: Leftback

Team information
- Current team: Sochaux
- Number: 33

Youth career
- 2011–2013: Mélanz Kartié
- 2013–2015: Plesséenne
- 2015–2017: Le Perreux
- 2017–2018: Créteil
- 2018–2020: Sochaux

Senior career*
Years	Team	Apps	(Gls)
2020–	Sochaux II	22	(0)
2020	Sochaux	1	(0)

International career^{‡}
2019	France U16	1	(0)
- * Club domestic league appearances and goals ‡ National team caps and goals as of 15 January 2023

Killian Camélé (born 16 March 2003) is a French professional footballer who plays as a leftback for Sochaux II.

== Professional career ==
Camélé made his professional debut with Sochaux in a 0-0 Ligue 2 tie with Pau FC on 15 December 2020.

== International career ==
Camélé is a youth international for France, having represented the France U16.
