= Antonio Miuțescu =

Romanian professional footballer

Personal information
- Full name: Antonio Eduard Miuțescu
- Date of birth: 28 October 2003 (age 23)
- Place of birth: Craiova, Romania
- Position: Midfielder

Team information
- Current team: FC U Craiova
- Number: 14

Youth career
- 2017–2018: Dinamyk Craiova
- 2018–2019: FC U Craiova
- 2019: CSJ Știința Craiova

Senior career*
Years	Team	Apps	(Gls)
2020–	FC U Craiova	3	(0)
- * Club domestic league appearances and goals as of 19:18, 18 February 2022 (UTC)

Antonio Eduard Miuțescu (born 28 October 2003) is a Romanian professional footballer who plays as a midfielder for Liga I side FC U Craiova 1948.

== Honours ==
FC U Craiova 1948

- Liga II: 2020–21
