= Elena Chernenko (journalist) =

Russian journalist & activist

Elena Vladimirovna Chernenko (Russian: Елена Владимировна Черненко) is a Russian journalist. She is a special correspondent of the Moscow daily newspaper Kommersant covering mostly arms control, non-proliferation and cyber security.

Chernenko was born on 15 October 1981. She holds a PhD from Moscow State University. She has worked for Russian Newsweek, the Voice of Russia and the Moskauer Deutsche Zeitung.

She is a member of the Board of the PIR-Center and a member of the Council for Foreign and Defense Policy.

== Links ==
- Biography of Elena Chernenko by Council for Foreign and Defense Policy
- "Working with experts is useful and terribly interesting" Interview with Elena Chernenko for the Vladimir Mezentsev School of Journalism
- "Russia is acting ahead of schedule" Interview with Elena Chernenko for the Vladimir Mezentsev School of Journalism
