= Leopold Niemirowski =

Polish painter

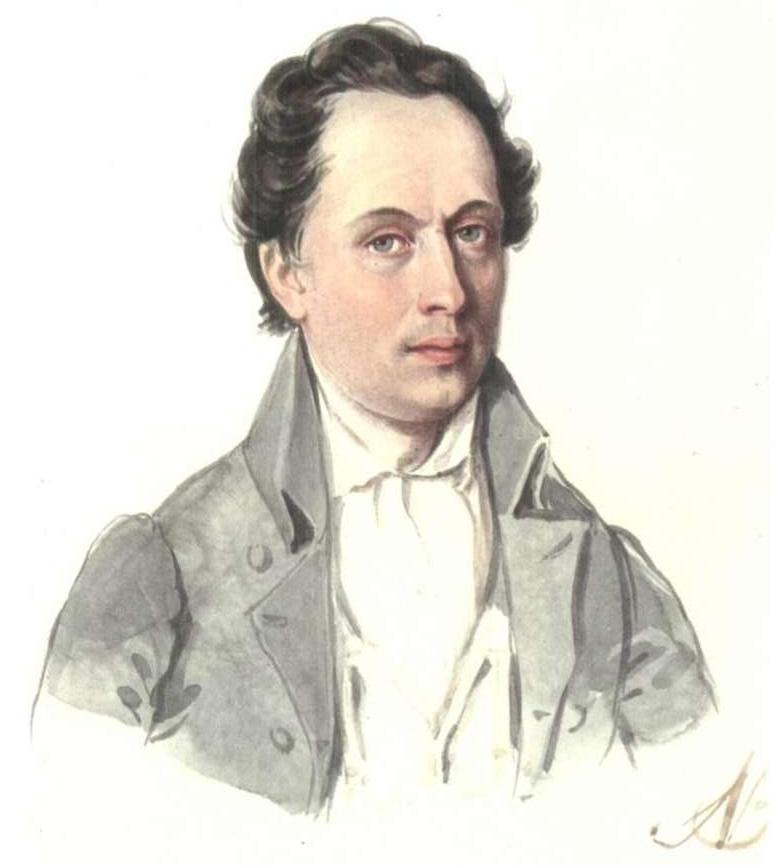
Leopold Niemirowski; portrait by Nikolay Bestuzhev.

Leopold Niemirowski (1810, Tahaczyn, Volhynian Governorate – December 1883, Liuboml) was a self-taught Polish painter; exiled to Siberia for his revolutionary activities.

== Biography ==
He originally studied law at the University of Vilnius. Later, he fought in the November Uprising with the forces of Piotr Wysocki, was wounded at the Battle of Ostrołęka and fled to Galicia, where he lived in Lwów.

When he tried to return home, he was arrested and imprisoned in Kyiv. He was pardoned in 1836, but continued his revolutionary work and was arrested in Odessa for his connections to Szymon Konarski. In 1839, he was sentenced to death, but the sentence was commuted to twenty years of hard labor in Siberia. At first he was sent to Tobolsk, then to Irkutsk, where he worked in the salt mines.

During this time, he made sketches which were noticed by the director of the salt works, who asked him to give lessons to his children. This drew the attention of the Governor-General and, as a result, in 1844, he accompanied an expedition of the Russian Geographical Society to Kamchatka; making anthropological studies of the Yakuts, Koryaks and Chukchi. In 1856, many of his drawings were taken to England, where they were made into steel engravings and released in an album called "Journey to East Siberia", but Niemirowski was not credited, due to his status as a political prisoner.

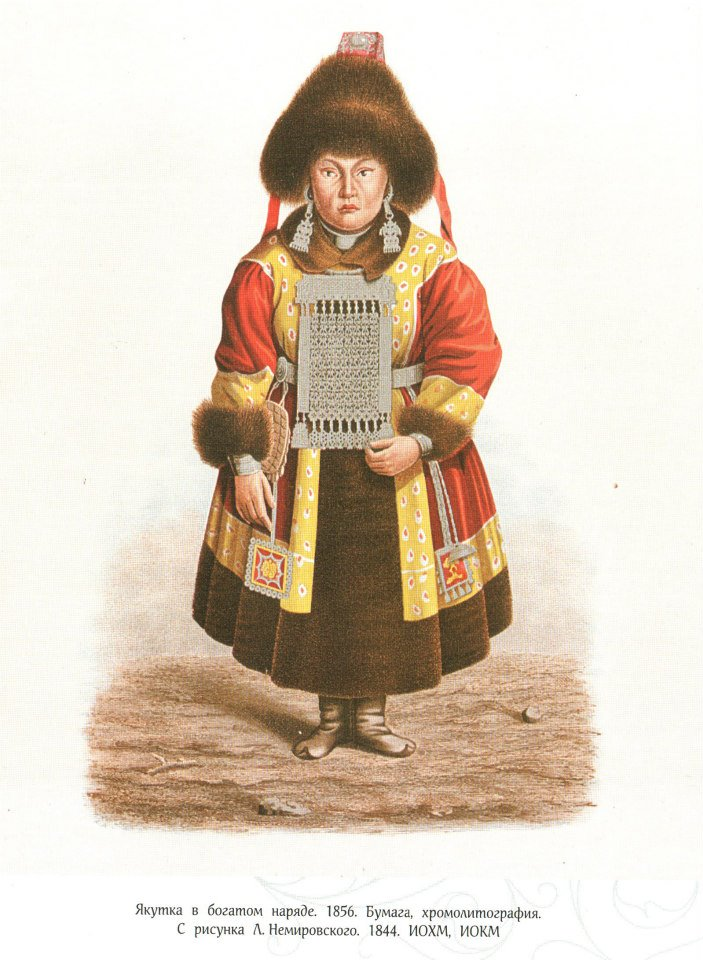
Yakut woman in formal dress

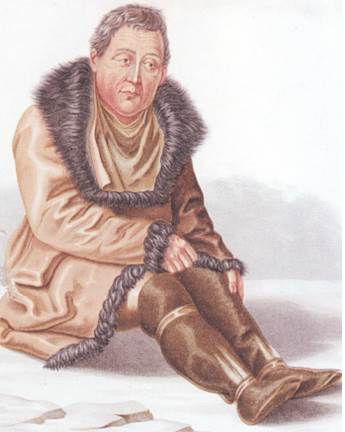
Chukchi man

In 1848, after his return to Irkutsk, members of the Konarski conspiracy were brought together and transferred to Tambov, in European Russia. In 1857, he was granted amnesty, but went back to live in Irkutsk and continued his explorations into rural Siberia. He also taught drawing and did portraits of the Polish exiles and prominent Russians. He left Siberia to hold exhibitions of his work in Paris (1867) and Warsaw (1870). Much of his original work was lost during a fire at his home in 1877.

In 2010, on the occasion of the 200th anniversary of his birth, a new edition of his album was published, giving him full credit. At the same time, an exhibition was held at the "Museum of the Decembrists" in Irkutsk, with copies of his works provided by the Polish Ministry of Culture.
