= Antonio Bokanovic =

Austrian footballer

Personal information
- Date of birth: 11 June 2003 (age 23)
- Position: Defender

Team information
- Current team: Dornbirner SV

Youth career
- 2011–2017: Dornbirn
- 2017–2020: AKA Vorarlberg

Senior career*
Years	Team	Apps	(Gls)
2020–2021	FC Dornbirn	1	(0)
2021–2022	SC Hatlerdorf	19	(2)
2022–	Dornbirner SV	0	(0)
- * Club domestic league appearances and goals as of 09:42, 24 July 2022 (UTC)

Antonio Bokanovic (born 11 June 2003) is an Austrian footballer who plays as a defender for Dornbirner SV.

== Career statistics ==
=== Club ===
As of 24 June 2020.

Appearances and goals by club, season and competition
Club	Season	League			Cup		Continental		Other		Total	
Club	Season	Division	Apps	Goals	Apps	Goals	Apps	Goals	Apps	Goals	Apps	Goals
Dornbirn	2019–20	2. Liga	1	0	0	0	–		0	0	1	0
Career total			1	0	0	0	0	0	0	0	1	0
