= Kuzma Andrianov =

- Кузьма Андрианов
- Born: Kuzma Andrianovich Andrianov; 28 December 1904; Kondrakovo village (now Zubtsovsky District, Tver Oblast, Russia)
- Died: 13 March 1978 (aged 73); Moscow, Soviet Union
- Occupation: Chemist

Kuzma Andrianovich Andrianov (Russian: Кузьма Андрианович Андрианов; 28 December 1904 — 13 March 1978) was a Soviet and Russian chemist and professor of Moscow Power Engineering Institute. Hero of Socialist Labour (1969). Four Stalin Prizes (1943, 1946, 1950, 1953).

== Biography ==
Kuzma Andrianovich Andrianov was born on 28 December 1904 (5 December in Old Style), 1904 in Kondrakovo village (now Zubtsovsky District, Tver Oblast, Russia). In 1930 he graduated from Chemical Faculty of Moscow State University. From 1929 to 1954 he worked at the All-Russian Electrotechnical Institute. In 1930—1932 he taught at Moscow Tannery Institute, in 1933—1941 — at D. Mendeleev University of Chemical Technology of Russia, in 1941—1959 at MPEI (professor since 1946).

In 1946-1953 he worked at the All-Russian Institute Of Aviation Materials. Since 1959 he was the Head of the Department of Polymer Synthesis at the Moscow Lomonosov Moscow State Institute of Molecular Biology. Since 1954 he also worked at Nesmeyanov Institute of Organoelement Compounds.

He was an Academician of the Academy of Sciences of the Soviet Union (1964; Corresponding Member since 1953), a member of CPSU since 1949 and an Honorary member of the Budapest Polytechnic University since 1965. He also was a Hero of Socialist Labour and a laureate of Lenin Prize.

He died on 13 March 1978 in Moscow and was at Novodevichy Cemetery.

=== Scientific work ===
Andrianov was a specialist in the field of synthesis and technology of high-molecular compounds. In 1937 he was the first to synthesize polyorganosiloxanes. Since 1947 he has discovered the basic principles of synthesis of polymers with inorganic chains of molecules, including polyorganometallosiloxanes. He led the research of the synthesis of heat-resistant organosilicon polymers and materials based on them, which are widely used for the insulation of electrical machines, apparatuses, production of lubricants, plastics, paint and varnish coatings.
