= Kusma, Võru County =

Village in Estonia

Kusma
- Location within Estonia
- Coordinates: 57°47′10″N 26°57′07″E
- Country: Estonia
- County: Võru County
- Municipality: Võru Parish

Kusma is a village in Estonia, in Võru Parish, which belongs to Võru County.
