= Park Hyun-bin (footballer) =

South Korean footballer (born 2003)

- Park with Bucheon FC 1995 in 2024

Personal information
- Date of birth: May 19, 2003 (age 23)
- Place of birth: South Korea
- Height: 1.77 m (5 ft 10 in)
- Positions: Central midfielder; attacking midfielder

Team information
- Current team: Suwon Samsung Bluewings
- Number: 16

Youth career
- Chunhyun Elementary School
- Goal Club
- 2019–2021: Incheon Daegun High School (youth)

Senior career*
Years	Team	Apps	(Gls)
2022–2023	Incheon United FC	6	(0)
2024–2025	Bucheon FC 1995	65	(3)
2026–	Suwon Samsung Bluewings	22	(3)

International career
2020	South Korea U17	3	(0)
2022–2023	South Korea U20	17	(0)
2025–	South Korea U23	5	(0)
Korean name
Hangul	박현빈
RR	Bak Hyeonbin
MR	Pak Hyŏnbin
- * Club domestic league appearances and goals as of November 1, 2026

Park Hyun-bin (Korean: 박현빈; born May 19, 2003) is a South Korean professional footballer who plays as a central midfielder for K League 2 club Suwon Samsung Bluewings. He made his debut appearance in the 2022 K League 1 season with Incheon United FC.

== Early life and career beginnings ==
Park Hyun-bin was born on May 19, 2003. He attended Chunhyun Elementary School, where he practiced taekwondo before shifting his focus to play football. He enrolled in Incheon Daegun High School and played for Incheon United's U-18 team as a defensive midfielder. He was captain of the squad in his final year of high school. The squad played in the K League U-18 Championship, where Park was named in the Best XI.

== Senior career ==
In a pool of 147 footballers, Park was one of six high school graduates selected to advance directly into the K League system in 2022. He signed with Incheon United that season as the youngest player on the squad. Park made his debut appearance in round 21 against Jeonbuk Hyundai Motors. He had limited playing opportunities in part because of call ups to South Korea's national youth teams. In addition to a competitive midfield, Park made only six appearances with the club by the end of his two-year tenure.

Park signed with Bucheon FC 1995 for the 2024 K League 2 season. He made his first squad appearance during the second round of the 2024 Korea Cup in a 2–1 victory against Busan Transportation Corporation FC. His debut league goal occurred in a 3–0 win against Chungnam Asan FC on May 27, 2024. He scored two goals and provided two assists in 28 appearances that year. In the following season, he contributed an additional goal and assist. His work rate along with his midfield offense and defense were considered among the best in the league. Park was regarded as a key player in Bucheon's promotion to the top division. At the K League Awards 2025, he was nominated for the K League 2 Best XI.

Park signed with Suwon Samsung Bluewings for the 2026 K League 2 season. On March 21, he scored his first goal and provided an assist against Gimhae FC, the first time in his career he recorded two goal contributions in a single match.

== International career ==
Park was called up to the South Korea national under-17 football team and played in the friendly Algarve International Tournament. He represented South Korea at the 2023 FIFA U-20 World Cup, appearing in five matches. He was part of the squad for the 2026 AFC U-23 Asian Cup qualification.

== Style of play ==
Park plays as a left-footed central midfielder who has been described as an all-rounder. He has been noted for his strengths in one-on-one duels, escaping the opposition's pressure, and precision in passing the ball. His playing style has been characterized as being "assertive and determined". He has cited Lee Myung-joo as his role model.

== Career statistics ==
=== Club ===
As of November 1, 2026.

Appearances and goals by club, season and competition
Club	Season	League			Cup		Continental		Other		Total	
Club	Season	Division	Apps	Goals	Apps	Goals	Apps	Goals	Apps	Goals	Apps	Goals
Incheon United FC	2022	K League 1	1	0	0	0	0	0	0	0	1	0
Incheon United FC	2023	K League 1	5	0	0	0	3	0	0	0	8	0
Bucheon FC 1995	2024	K League 2	28	2	1	0	0	0	0	0	29	2
Bucheon FC 1995	2025	K League 2	37	1	2	0	0	0	0	0	39	1
Suwon Samsung Bluewings	2026	K League 2	22	3	0	0	0	0	0	0	22	3
Career total			93	6	3	0	3	0	0	0	99	6

== Honors ==
Bucheon FC 1995

- K League 2: 2025
