= Moskauer Deutsche Zeitung =

German-language newspaper in Moscow

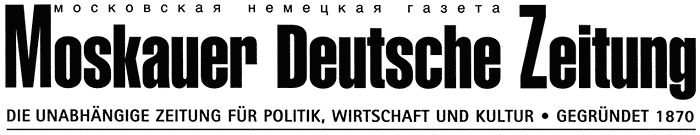
- Type: biweekly newspaper
- Publisher: MaWI Group
- Editor: Olga and Heinrich Martens
- Founded: 1870; 155 years ago
- Language: German, Russian
- Relaunched: 1998; 27 years ago
- Headquarters: Malaya Pirogovskaya Ulitsa 5
- City: Moscow
- Country: Russia
- Circulation: 25,000
- ISSN: 1563-1656 (print); 1684-0151 (web)
- Website: mdz-moskau.eu

The Moskauer Deutsche Zeitung, or MDZ for short (Russian: Московская немецкая газета), is a biweekly newspaper published in Moscow and partially online. It consists of 24 pages, two thirds (16 pages) of which are in German and one third (8 pages) in Russian. The print edition has a circulation of approx. 25,000 copies. It is distributed in hotels, cafés, restaurants, business centres and airports in Moscow. Editors are Olga and Heinrich Martens.

== History ==
In 1870 Theodor Ries founded the Moskauer Deutsche Zeitung, shortly afterwards he left the newspaper to Christian Woldemar. Until the beginning of the First World War it served as a source of information for the Germans in Moscow. Due to the war it had to cease its publication and could not be revived during the time of the Soviet Union.

On 12 April 1998 the MDZ was re-established by the International Association of German Culture. Since 2000 the newspaper publishes a selection of its articles on a website. The website was relaunched in 2012. The MDZ also issues special editions on a regular basis.
