= Kozma Gamburov =

Russian opera singer

Kozma Ivanovich Gamburov
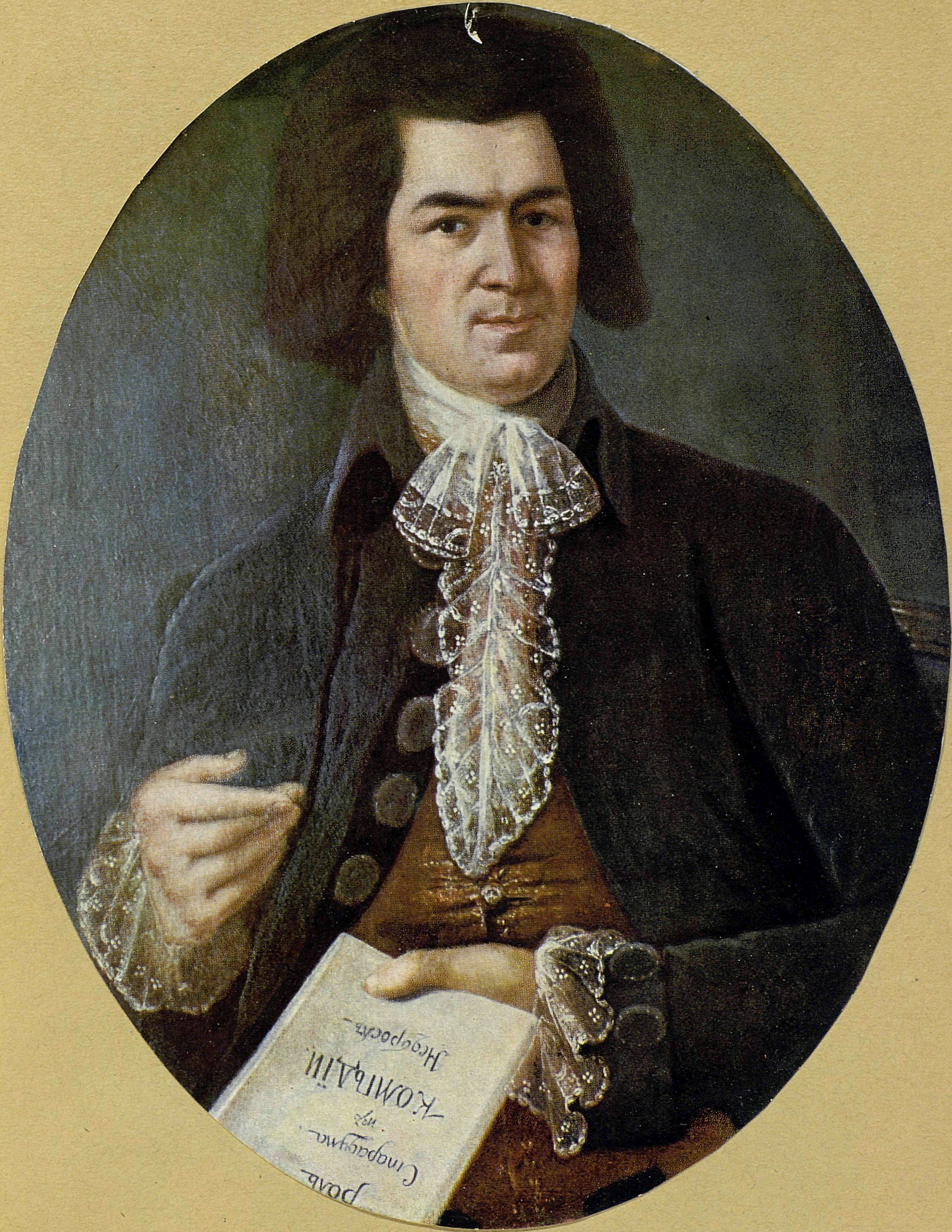
- Gamburov in the role of Starodum (The Minor)
- Died: 1810
- Occupations: Actor, opera singer

Kozma Gamburov (died 1810) was a Russian stage actor and opera singer. In 1777, he was engaged at the Karl Knipper Theatre, where he was part of the early generation of performers associated with the city’s newly established public theatre. Gamburov was known for performing leading male roles, particularly heroic characters and romantic lovers.
