= Jan Kuźma =

Polish footballer (born 2003)

Personal information
- Date of birth: 1 June 2003 (age 23)
- Place of birth: Nowy Sącz, Poland
- Height: 1.91 m (6 ft 3 in)
- Position: Midfielder

Team information
- Current team: Ząbkovia Ząbki
- Number: 16

Youth career
- –2016: Dunajec Nowy Sącz
- 2016–2017: Sokół Stary Sącz
- 2017–2020: Sandecja Nowy Sącz

Senior career*
| Years | Team | Apps | (Gls) |
| 2020–2021 | Sandecja Nowy Sącz | 14 | (1) |
| 2021–2022 | ŁKS Łódź | 22 | (0) |
| 2021–2024 | ŁKS Łódź II | 38 | (8) |
| 2023 | → Górnik Polkowice (loan) | 13 | (2) |
| 2024 | Sandecja Nowy Sącz | 2 | (0) |
| 2025 | Barycz Sułów | 15 | (1) |
| 2026– | Ząbkovia Ząbki | 0 | (0) |

International career
| 2022 | Poland U20 | 1 | (0) |
- * Club domestic league appearances and goals as of 23:52, 3 June 2026 (UTC)

Jan Kuźma (born 1 June 2003) is a Polish professional footballer who plays as a midfielder for III liga club Ząbkovia Ząbki. He is the younger brother of fellow footballer Szymon Kuźma.

== Career statistics ==
As of match played 18 June 2025

Appearances and goals by club, season and competition
| Club | Season | League | | | Polish Cup | | Continental | | Other | | Total | |
| Club | Season | Division | Apps | Goals | Apps | Goals | Apps | Goals | Apps | Goals | Apps | Goals |
|---|---|---|---|---|---|---|---|---|---|---|---|---|
| Sandecja Nowy Sącz | 2019–20 | I liga | 5 | 0 | 0 | 0 | — | | — | | 5 | 0 |
| Sandecja Nowy Sącz | 2020–21 | I liga | 9 | 1 | 1 | 0 | — | | — | | 10 | 1 |
| Sandecja Nowy Sącz | Total | | 14 | 1 | 1 | 0 | — | | — | | 15 | 1 |
| ŁKS Łódź | 2021–22 | I liga | 13 | 0 | 2 | 0 | — | | — | | 15 | 0 |
| ŁKS Łódź | 2022–23 | I liga | 9 | 0 | 0 | 0 | — | | — | | 9 | 0 |
| ŁKS Łódź | Total | | 22 | 0 | 2 | 0 | — | | — | | 24 | 0 |
| ŁKS Łódź II | 2021–22 | III liga, gr. I | 11 | 1 | — | | — | | — | | 11 | 1 |
| ŁKS Łódź II | 2022–23 | III liga, gr. I | 5 | 2 | — | | — | | — | | 5 | 2 |
| ŁKS Łódź II | 2023–24 | II liga | 18 | 4 | — | | — | | — | | 18 | 4 |
| ŁKS Łódź II | 2024–25 | II liga | 4 | 1 | 0 | 0 | — | | — | | 4 | 1 |
| ŁKS Łódź II | Total | | 38 | 8 | — | | — | | — | | 38 | 8 |
| Górnik Polkowice (loan) | 2022–23 | II liga | 13 | 2 | — | | — | | — | | 13 | 2 |
| Sandecja Nowy Sącz | 2024–25 | III liga, gr. IV | 2 | 0 | 0 | 0 | — | | — | | 2 | 0 |
| Barycz Sułów | 2024–25 | IV liga Lower Silesia | 13 | 1 | — | | — | | 2 (Note: Appearances in IV liga promotion play-offs) | 0 | 15 | 1 |
| Ząbkovia Ząbki | 2025–26 | III liga, gr. I | 0 | 0 | — | | — | | — | | 0 | 0 |
| Career total | | | 102 | 12 | 3 | 0 | 0 | 0 | 2 | 0 | 107 | 12 |

== Honours ==
ŁKS Łódź II

- III liga, group I: 2022–23

Barycz Sułów

- Polish Cup (Wrocław regionals): 2024–25
