= Robert Kozma (professor) =

American computer scientist

Robert Kozma is First Tennessee University Professor of Mathematics at the University of Memphis.

== Biography ==
Kozma received his MS in Power Engineering from the Moscow Power Engineering Institute in 1982, his MS in mathematics from the Eötvös Loránd University in 1988, and his PhD in Applied Physics from Delft University of Technology in 1992

Kozma has been associate professor at the Department of Quantum Science and Engineering, Tohoku University, Sendai, Japan since 1993. He became Assistant Professor/Lecturer at the Department of Information Sciences, Otago University, Dunedin, New Zealand in 1996. In 1998 in the USA he became a joint appointment at the Division of Neurobiology and the EECS Department, University of California, Berkeley. In 2009 he was appointed Professor of Computer Science, University of Memphis, Memphis, Tennessee, and since 2009 he is Professor of Mathematical Sciences, University of Memphis, Memphis, Tennessee. Since 2001 he is also director of Computational Neurodynamics Laboratory, presently CLION, FedEx Institute of Technology of the University of Memphis, Memphis.

He serves on the AdCom of IEEE Computational Intelligence Society CIS (2009–2012) and on the Governing Board of the International Neural Network Society INNS (2004–2012). He is Chair of the Distinguished Lecturer Program, IEEE CIS. He has been Technical Committee Member of IEEE Computational Intelligence Society since 1996, and IEEE Senior Member. He also served in leading positions at over 20 international conferences, including General Chair of IEEE/INNS International Joint Conference on Neural Networks IJCNN09 in Atlanta; Program Co-chair of International Joint Conference on Neural Networks IJCNN08/WCCI08 in Hong Kong; Program Co-chair of IJCNN04, Budapest, Hungary; chair for Finances of IEEE WCCI06, Vancouver, Canada.

He is Associate Editor of ‘Neural Networks (Elsevier),’ ‘IEEE Transactions on Neural Networks,’ ‘Neurocomputing’ (Elsevier), ‘Journal of Cognitive Neurodynamics’ (Springer), Area Editor of ‘New Mathematics and Natural Computation’ (World Scientific), and ‘Cognitive Systems Research.’

== Work ==
Kozma's current research interests include spatio-temporal dynamics of neural processes, random graph approaches to large-scale networks, such as neural networks, computational intelligence methods for knowledge acquisition and autonomous decision making in biological and artificial systems.
