= Tim Gaines =

Timothy Gaines
- Gaines performing on September 12, 2009

Background information
- Born: December 15, 1962 (age 63)
- Origin: Portland, Oregon, U.S.
- Genres: Christian metal, hard rock, heavy metal, glam metal
- Occupations: Bassist, singer
- Instruments: Bass guitar, vocals
- Years active: 1983–present
- Website: www.timothygaines.net

Tim Gaines (born Timothy Hagelganz; December 15, 1962) is an American bass guitarist best-known as the long-time bassist for the Christian metal band Stryper until his departure in 2017.

== Biography ==
=== Early life ===
Gaines was born in Portland, Oregon, into a German family, whose ancestry was that of the Volga Germans. When Gaines was four years old, he and his family moved to Arcadia, California, where he later attended Arcadia High School. When he was young, he was bullied by classmates at school because of his unique and often mispronounced last name, Hagelganz, and for being the son of Arcadia Presbyterian Church's pastor. He later adopted the stage name Gaines in the likeness of his uncles Reuben, a radio announcer, and Ronnie, a jazz nightclub performer, who also used the name professionally.

== Musical career ==
=== With Stormer ===
After Arcadia High School, Gaines joined the band Stormer, with whom he recorded a demo and had performed extensively in Los Angeles and on Hollywood's Sunset Strip.

At the time Gaines joined Stormer, they had already been a popular band for 10 years in the Los Angeles area. The lineup at the time consisted of Tom Hardy on vocals; Steve Hall on drums; Stephan Shawn on guitar, keys, and vocals; and Donny Simmons on lead guitar and vocals.

Gaines shared with the Power Rock Podcast how Mötley Crüe's first ever performance was as an opening act for Stormer in 1981.

In an interview about Stormer, Gaines recalled, "We signed a deal with an indie label called Rockwoodz music out of Phoenix, Arizona, and they put us in the studio to record an album and a Christmas single. Well, the single was the only thing that ever made it to vinyl and 500 singles were sent out all over the U.S. to radio. We got some good reviews for the single in some trade magazines but nothing ever happened with the band. For whatever reason, Rockwoodz went belly up and the album was never released. We did some small tours around the southwest but eventually I was to leave the group."

Gaines recommitted to Christianity in 1983 and joined the recently formed Roxx Regime.

In 2008, when asked if the demos will be remastered and made public, Gaines replied, "I doubt if anyone can find the Masters. We are talking of having a Stormer reunion in the near future. We may decide to record it." Gaines occasionally collaborated with Donny Simmons and Tom Hardy when he was not working with Stryper.

=== With Stryper ===
Being a Sunset Strip regular, in 1983, Gaines joined up with Michael Sweet, Robert Sweet, and Oz Fox, all of whom had already formed Roxx Regime, which they would later change to Stryper. According to Michael Sweet, the band noticed Gaines had disappeared from Stormer's promotional photographs in BAM magazine and telephoned his home to enquire about a new bass player. Gaines' mother told them he had left the band after becoming a Christian; his father was a Presbyterian preacher. Gaines joined without a formal audition. Gaines quickly rounded out the quartet's sound with his bass, background vocal, and keyboard skills. Gaines recorded the band's debut EP The Yellow and Black Attack and their follow-up full-length album, Soldiers Under Command, in 1985.

Gaines briefly left the band during the pre-production period of the band's Platinum-selling album To Hell with the Devil but rejoined the band after the sessions were concluded to tour. According to Michael Sweet, the band felt Gaines' jazz-influenced playing style did not suit the tighter rhythmic feel they wanted for the album, and a session player was brought in to record the bass parts instead. Gaines was also temporarily replaced for the subsequent tour by bassist Matt Hurich of Leatherwolf; a widely circulated promotional photograph from this period, often assumed to depict the band's full lineup, in fact features Hurich rather than Gaines. Sweet has stated the band reinstated Gaines ahead of the tour after concluding that "Stryper is Michael Sweet, Robert Sweet, Oz Fox and Tim Gaines."

Gaines did not play on the band's follow-up, In God We Trust, but toured in support of the album.

Gaines's contributions to the band's next release, Against the Law, were evident in his playing throughout the album, but he did not play on the band's cover of Earth, Wind & Fire's "Shining Star," which featured bassist Randy Jackson.

With Stryper, Gaines had contributed to 17 albums, including live performances and studio albums. Soldiers Under Command was certified Gold and To Hell with the Devil was certified Platinum.

=== Post-Stryper ===
After Stryper, Gaines played in Rex Carroll's project King James along with Stryper alum Robert Sweet. He also recorded with Tourniquet on Crawl to China. Afterward, he formed SinDizzy with Stryper guitarist Oz Fox and released one album, He's Not Dead.

=== Stryper reunion ===
Gaines's involvement with Fox in SinDizzy led to a partial Stryper reunion in 1999 at a concert in Puerto Rico, to which both SinDizzy and former Stryper frontman Michael Sweet were invited. Later, all former bandmates played a show in Costa Rica, leading to a full-blown reunion in 2000. These appearances led to a 2003 reunion tour and a new compilation release, 7. Gaines spent April and May 2007 supporting Richard Marx on bass, touring the U.S., the Dominican Republic, and Trinidad. Gaines joined Tourniquet on stage at Flevo Festival in 2008.

In fall 2009, Gaines released his first solo effort titled Breakfast @ Timothy's.

On September 6, 2011, Gaines began endorsing Overture Guitars with a signature model, the Overture Stronghold TG Bass.

In September 2016, Stryper frontman Michael Sweet announced that the band would be going on hiatus due to personal issues affecting bassist Timothy Gaines. The hiatus would begin once the band had completed the To Hell With the Devil 30th Anniversary Tour. Sweet stated that they did not plan to continue as a band without Gaines after that time. During the hiatus the band members stated that they would pray about the direction of the band going forward. Later Sweet stated that Gaines was moving on from the personal issues and would take time to decide what he wanted to do in regards to the band. While Sweet disliked the idea of continuing without Gaines, he stated that he was open to filling the position of bassist with the right person if necessary. Gaines then confirmed that he was no longer a member of the band.

Following the hiatus, the band issued a statement advising that Gaines had been fired from the band and removing him from the roster on the band's website. Gaines claimed that he was kicked out after he was given an ultimatum by the band.

== Discography ==
=== Stryper ===
- The Yellow and Black Attack (1984)
- Soldiers Under Command (1985)
- Against the Law (1990)
- Can't Stop the Rock (1991)
- 7: The Best of Stryper (2003)
- The Covering (2011)
- Second Coming (2013)
- No More Hell to Pay (2013)
- Live at the Whisky (2014)
- Fallen (2015)

=== Solo ===
- Breakfast At Timothy's (2009)

=== Guest appearances ===
- Crawl to China, Tourniquet (bass on "Claustrospelunker") (1997)
- Music City Live, Bryan Duncan & The NehoSoul Band (bass on "Blue Skies") (2004)
- Rock Of Ages - Where Classic Hymns Meets Classic Rock, Dez Dickerson (bass on "Amazing Grace" and "Fairest Lord Jesus") (2005)
- Soundtrack Of A Soul, Liberty N' Justice (2006)
- Sin Paredes, Sin Paredes (bass on "Sólo en Mi) (2007)
- I'm Not Your Suicide, Michael Sweet (bass on "How To Live") (2014)
- Homo Homini Lupus, Pÿlon (bass on "South of Heaven") (2014)

=== Other works ===
- King James, King James (1994)
- SinDizzy, SinDizzy (1998)
- Faithsedge, Faithsedge (2019)
