= Fallen (Stryper album) =

Studio album by Stryper
- Released: October 16, 2015
- Recorded: 2014–2015 at Sprinthouse Studios (Northampton, Massachusetts) and Mixed Emotions (Middleton, Massachusetts).
- Genres: Christian metal, Christian rock, hard rock, glam metal, power metal
- Length: 52:22
- Label: Frontiers
- Producer: Michael Sweet

Stryper chronology
Live at the Whisky (2014)	Fallen (2015)	God Damn Evil (2018)

Fallen is the sixteenth release and the eleventh studio album by the Christian metal band Stryper, produced by the frontman Michael Sweet and released on October 16, 2015.

== Background ==
Fallen is an album featuring the band's signature sounds and style on mostly original songs and one cover song, unlike several of their previous albums which covered their own songs (2013's Second Coming) and covers of others' works (2011's The Covering). However, the sound of the album is heavier, but still retains the band's melodic pattern. Five singles from the album have been released per month, "Yahweh", "Fallen", "Big Screen Lies", "Let There Be Light", and Stryper's second Black Sabbath cover, "After Forever".

== Critical reception ==
Professional ratings
Review scores
Source	Rating
CCM Magazine	4/5 stars
HM Magazine	4/5 stars
Jesus Freak Hideout	4/5 stars
The Phantom Tollbooth	4/5; 4/5

Awarding the album four stars from HM magazine, Charlie Steffens wrote, "another wonderful album from some of rock and roll's best songwriters." Andy Argyrakis, giving the album four stars at CCM magazine, said, "Arguably the most game-changing Christian rock band in history, Stryper continues to excel with a steady stream of new music that fits right alongside a ten million-album selling catalogue." Rating the album a four out of five by The Phantom Tollbooth, Bert Saraco said, "Stryper marches on with Fallen – exactly what you want to hear from the iconic pop-metal band with a few surprises on the side". Derek Walker, in a four out of five review for The Phantom Tollbooth, responded, "It may not quite reach the heights of the previous release, but Fallen shows great ambition for a band this far into its career." In a four star review at Jesus Freak Hideout, Bert Gangl described, "the presence of the last few songs does ultimately render Fallen marginally less impressive than No More Hell to Pay."

== Commercial performance ==
The album sold over 10,000 copies in its first weeks, which is 400 more copies than No More Hell to Pay in 2013.

== Track listing ==
All tracks are written by Michael Sweet, except where noted.

No.	Title	Writer(s)	Length
1.	"Yahweh"	Michael Sweet, Clint Lowery	6:21
2.	"Fallen"		3:46
3.	"Pride"		4:32
4.	"Big Screen Lies"		4:29
5.	"Heaven"		4:20
6.	"Love You Like I Do"	Michael Sweet, Oz Fox	3:53
7.	"All Over Again"		3:50
8.	"After Forever" (Black Sabbath cover)	Tony Iommi, Ozzy Osbourne, Bill Ward, Geezer Butler	5:51
9.	"Till I Get What I Need"		2:41
10.	"Let There Be Light"		4:32
11.	"The Calling"	Michael Sweet, Oz Fox	3:54
12.	"King of Kings"		4:13
Total length:			52:22

Japanese edition
No.	Title	Length
13.	"All Over Again" (acoustic version)	3:49

== Personnel ==
- Michael Sweet - lead vocals, guitar
- Robert Sweet - drums, percussion
- Oz Fox - lead guitar, vocals
- Tim Gaines - bass guitar, vocals

=== Additional personnel ===
- Paul McNamara - additional keyboards, synthesizer and Moog
- Laura Manzi - additional vocals on chorus of "Yahweh"

== Charts ==
Chart (2015)	Peak position
Swiss Albums (Schweizer Hitparade)	87
UK Rock & Metal Albums (Official Charts)	37
US Billboard 200	44
US Top Christian Albums (Billboard)	2
US Digital Albums (Billboard)	29
US Independent Albums (Billboard)	7
US Top Album Sales (Billboard)	26
US Top Hard Rock Albums (Billboard)	2
US Top Gospel Albums (Billboard)	2
US Top Rock Albums (Billboard)	5
US Indie Store Album Sales (Billboard)	17
