= No More Hell to Pay =

Studio album by Stryper
- Released: November 5, 2013
- Recorded: 2013
- Genres: Christian metal; glam metal; heavy metal
- Length: 51:52
- Label: Frontiers
- Producer: Michael Sweet

Stryper chronology
Second Coming (2013)	No More Hell to Pay (2013)	Live at the Whisky (2014)

No More Hell to Pay is the fifteenth release and tenth studio album from Christian glam metal band Stryper, produced by band frontman Michael Sweet and released on November 5, 2013 by Frontiers Records. The album garnered positive critical reception from music critics as well as commercial success.

== Background ==
No More Hell to Pay follows up the band's earlier 2013 release, Second Coming, on which the band performed new renditions of many of its old songs. Front-man Michael Sweet produced No More Hell to Pay and wrote eleven of the twelve tracks. In an interview with MetalExiles, Sweet stated that in writing the album, the band tried for a heavier sound reminiscent of Iron Maiden, Judas Priest, and Van Halen.

== Style and lyrics ==
The classic sound on No More Hell to Pay is similar to the band's sound from its peak in the 1980s, but features a new maturity and grittiness. At CCM Magazine, Andy Argyrakis described the album as equal parts aggressive and melodic with massive guitar solos and layered harmonies, and noted that it intentionally references the band's early days without sounding dated. Lee Brown of Indie Vision Music likewise wrote that the album could easily have been released during the band's heyday in the late 1980s and early 1990s, and remarked that it has the high, falsetto vocals, riffing guitars, and bold, faith-centered lyrics which fans would expect. Bert Saraco of The Phantom Tollbooth highlighted that the group continues "the Stryper tradition: not so big on the subtleties, heavy enough to rock you, hooky enough to get under your skin", and that it combines elements of pop, metal, and arena-rock. Greg Pratt of Exclaim! praised the drum work on the album, particularly the hi-hat and bass drum. At About.com, Chad Bowar noted how the album was "mostly mid-tempo and jam packed with hooks." Ian Webber of Cross Rhythms wrote that the overabundance of yelling that Stryper was known for was still present on the album.

== Critical reception ==
Professional ratings
Review scores
Source	Rating
AllMusic.com	3.5/5 stars
About.com	4.5/5 stars 4/5 stars
CCM Magazine	4/5 stars
Classic Rock	6/10
Decibel	7/10
Exclaim!	6/10
HM	3.5/5 stars
Indie Vision Music	4/5 stars
Jesus Freak Hideout	4.5/5 stars
New Release Tuesday	3.5/5 stars
The Phantom Tollbooth	4/5 stars 4.5/5 stars

No More Hell to Pay garnered a positive reception by music critics. At CCM Magazine, Argyrakis rated the album four out of five stars, and claimed that this was one of the band's hardest and spiritually powerful albums to date. Brown of Indie Vision Music criticized the inclusion of the cover song, but gave the album four out of five stars and found the band's '80s sound a refreshing change from currently popular styles such as metalcore and techno. At HM, David Stagg gave the album three-and-a-half stars out of five, and agreed with Michael Sweet's touting of the album as the best of the band's career, stating that the one major flaw on the album is the cover of the Doobie Brothers' "Jesus Is Just Alright". Shawn Macomber of Decibel gave the album a similar rating and affirmed that the release represents a revitalized band. At About.com, Kim Jones rated the album four-and-a-half out of five stars, calling it much tougher than anything Stryper has made in their respective careers, and Bowar was enjoyably astonished with the album rating it a four out of five stars. Webber of Cross Rhythms rated the album nine out of ten, and stated the album had all the elements of a Stryper work that can at times sound outmoded by today's musical framework. Yet, Webber noted this does not significantly hamper the release, and touched on that old fans and some new ones will be happy with the offering.

At Jesus Freak Hideout, both reviewers gave the album four-and-a-half out of five stars. One proclaimed that after twenty-five years and seven albums, the band finally created a worthy successor to 1986's To Hell With the Devil. Mark Rice said the album might be the best of the band's career and could earn the band some new fans. At New Release Tuesday, Francesco gave the album three-and-a-half stars out of five whilst The Phantom Tollbooth rated the album four out of five and five-and-a-half out of five stars with their two reviews. Jono Davies of Louder Than the Music rated the album four out of five stars, and felt that the album was one of high caliber material on which the band acquits themselves quite superbly. However, the album got mixed reviews from Classic Rock and Exclaim!. At Classic Rock, Paul Elliot rated the album a six-out-of-ten and called the album the band's "heaviest to date", and Exclaim!'s Greg Pratt gave the album a six out of ten based mainly on the drum work.

== Commercial performance ==
The album sold around 9,600 copies in the United States in its first week of release to debut at position No. 35 on the Billboard 200 chart. and it was the No. 2 Top Christian Album sold the same week. On the other charts, it was the No. 6 most sold album on Top Rock Albums chart, the No. 3 Top Hard Rock Albums, and it came in at No. 6 on the Independent Albums chart. The album has sold 31,000 copies in the United States as of September 2015.

== Track listing ==
All tracks are written by Michael Sweet unless noted below.

No.	Title	Writer(s)	Length
1.	"Revelation"		4:31
2.	"No More Hell to Pay"	Michael Sweet, Robert Sweet	5:07
3.	"Saved by Love"		3:08
4.	"Jesus Is Just Alright"	Arthur Reid Reynolds	5:10
5.	"The One"		4:11
6.	"Legacy"		4:15
7.	"Marching Into Battle"		4:45
8.	"Te Amo"		4:17
9.	"Sticks & Stones"		4:21
10.	"Water Into Wine"		3:42
11.	"Sympathy"		4:13
12.	"Renewed"		4:21
Total length:			51:52

Japanese edition
No.	Title	Length
13.	"First Love (Orchestral Version)"	4:20

== Personnel ==
Stryper

- Michael Sweet – lead vocals, backing vocals, lead and rhythm guitars
- Oz Fox – lead and rhythm guitars, backing vocals
- Tim Gaines – bass, backing vocals
- Robert Sweet – drums, percussion

Additional personnel

- Paul McNamara – keyboards, synthesizers

== Production ==
- Michael Sweet – producer
- Danny Bernini – recording, mixing, mastering
- Kenny Lewis – editing
- Recorded, Mixed and Mastered at Spirit House Music (Northampton, MA).
- Edited at Mixed Emotions (Middleton, MA).

== Charts ==
Chart (2013)	Peak position
US Billboard 200	35
US Top Christian Albums (Billboard)	2
US Independent Albums (Billboard)	6
US Top Hard Rock Albums (Billboard)	3
US Top Rock Albums (Billboard)	6
US Indie Store Album Sales (Billboard)	11
