= In God We Trust (Stryper album) =

Studio album by Stryper
- Released: June 28, 1988
- Studios: A&M Studios and Cherokee Studios (Hollywood, California); The Village Recorder and Amigo Studios (Los Angeles, California)
- Genres: Christian metal; glam metal; heavy metal
- Length: 37:55
- Label: Enigma
- Producers: Michael Lloyd and Stryper

Stryper chronology
| To Hell with the Devil (1986) | In God We Trust (1988) | Against the Law (1990) |

Singles from In God We Trust
- 1. "Always There for You" Released: 1988; 2. "I Believe In You" Released: 1988; 3. "Keep the Fire Burning" Released: 1988; 4. "The Reign" Released: 1988

Professional ratings
Review scores
| Source | Rating |
|---|---|
| AllMusic | 3/5 stars |
| Jesus Freak Hideout | 4/5 stars |
| Rolling Stone | 2/5 stars |

In God We Trust is the fourth studio album by Christian metal band Stryper, released in 1988. The album achieved Gold record status, selling over half a million copies. Three singles were released including "Always There For You" and "I Believe in You" which both hit the Billboard Hot 100 chart peaking at No. 71 and No. 88 respectively - the second song, however, became a hit in Brazil, as part of soundtrack of the novela O Salvador da Pátria. The third single "Keep The Fire Burning" did not chart. The album received two GMA Dove Awards for "Hard Music Album" and "Hard Rock Song" for the title track.

The album's original cover design depicted a $100 bill bearing the Stryper logo and the phrase "In God We Trust," but was rejected following US government intervention over the use of imagery resembling legal tender. The cover was revised to show the bill in black and white rather than the traditional green, contributing to a delay from the planned April 1988 release. The album was produced by Michael Lloyd, who had previously worked with Belinda Carlisle.

Kim Neely of Rolling Stone dismissed the album as "a saccharine hodgepodge of PTL sentiment," writing that "the melodies aren't half-bad, but born-again Styx just doesn't wash with your average slam fan."

The band chose a $100 bill as the album's cover image as a deliberate reminder that the phrase "In God We Trust" appears on all American currency.

== Track listing ==
All songs written by Michael Sweet except where noted

1. "In God We Trust" (M. Sweet, Robert Sweet) – 3:56
2. "Always There for You" – 4:09
3. "Keep the Fire Burning" – 3:35
4. "I Believe in You" – 3:17
5. "The Writings on the Wall" – 4:19
6. "It's Up 2 U" – 3:51
7. "The World of You and I" – 3:45
8. "Come to the Everlife" (Oz Fox) – 4:09
9. "Lonely" – 4:09
10. "The Reign" (Fox) – 2:50

== Personnel ==
Stryper

- Michael Sweet – lead vocals, backing vocals, guitars
- Oz Fox – lead guitars, backing vocals
- Robert Sweet – drums

Additional musicians

- Billy Meyers – keyboards
- John Van Tongeren – keyboards
- Stephen Croes – Synclavier programming
- Brad Cobb – session bass

== Production ==
- Michael Lloyd – producer, mixing
- Stryper – producers, mixing, album design concept
- Dan Nebanzal – engineer, mixing
- Carmine Rubino – engineer, mixing
- Tom Bosley – assistant engineer
- Charlie Brocco – assistant engineer
- Dave Deavalon – assistant engineer
- Jeff DeMorris – assistant engineer, mix assistant
- Scott Gordon – assistant engineer
- Robert Hart – assistant engineer, mix assistant
- Mark McKenna – assistant engineer
- Gary Myerberg – assistant engineer
- Brian Scheuble – assistant engineer
- Bob Vogt – assistant engineer
- Bernie Grundman – mastering at Bernie Grundman Mastering (Hollywood, California)
- Patrick Pending – art direction
- Neil Zlozower – photography
- Anne Revenge – additional photography
- Kyle Rae Sweet – make-up
- Ray Brown – wardrobe stylist

== Charts ==
| Chart (1988) | Peak position |
|---|---|
| Canada Top Albums/CDs (RPM) | 53 |
| Finnish Albums (The Official Finnish Charts) | 32 |
| Japanese Albums (Oricon) | 49 |
| Swedish Albums (Sverigetopplistan) | 28 |
| Swiss Albums (Schweizer Hitparade) | 25 |
| US Billboard 200 | 32 |
| US Top Christian Albums (Billboard) | 5 |

== Certifications ==
| Region | Certification | Certified units/sales |
|---|---|---|
| United States (RIAA) | Gold | 500,000^{^} |
^{^} Shipments figures based on certification alone.
