= The Covering =

Studio album by Stryper
- Released: February 15, 2011
- Recorded: 2010
- Genre: Christian metal, heavy metal, hard rock, glam metal
- Length: 53:21
- Label: Big3 Records/Sony
- Producer: Michael Sweet, Bill Edwards

Stryper chronology
Murder by Pride (2009)	The Covering (2011)	Second Coming (2013)

Singles from The Covering
- 1. "Heaven and Hell" Released: September 14, 2010; 2. "Carry On Wayward Son" Released: December 14, 2010

Professional ratings
Review scores
Source	Rating
AllMusic	3/5 stars

The Covering is the thirteenth release and eighth studio album by American Christian heavy metal/hard rock band Stryper, released by Big 3 Records/Sony on February 15, 2011. The album is a collection of twelve cover songs from bands that inspired Stryper and helped to shape the band's sound and musical identity. The album also includes "God", a new original recording.

== History ==
The album was originally scheduled to be released on October 13, 2010. On October 22, 2010, it was announced on the band's official site that due to the feeling of the business and label team that more set-up time will allow for a stronger release, the album was projected to be released in the first quarter of 2011. On January 24, 2011 Michael Sweet announced via Twitter that the official release date for the album is February 15.

== Singles ==
On September 14, 2010, it was announced that the album's first single, a cover of Black Sabbath's hit "Heaven and Hell", was available on iTunes.

The second single, a cover of Kansas' "Carry on Wayward Son", was made available on iTunes on December 14, 2010.

== Track listing ==
No.	Title	Writer(s)	Original artist (date)	Length
1.	"Set Me Free"	Scott	Sweet (1974)	3:45
2.	"Blackout"	Schenker, Meine, Rarebell, Kittelsen	Scorpions (1982)	3:58
3.	"Heaven and Hell"	Dio, Iommi, Ward, Butler	Black Sabbath (1980)	6:11
4.	"Lights Out"	Schenker, Mogg, Parker, Way	UFO (1977)	3:45
5.	"Carry On Wayward Son"	Livgren	Kansas (1976)	5:16
6.	"Highway Star"	Blackmore, Gillan, Glover, Lord, Paice	Deep Purple (1972)	5:45
7.	"Shout It Out Loud"	Stanley, Simmons, Ezrin	Kiss (1976)	3:15
8.	"Over the Mountain"	Osbourne, Rhoads, Daisley, Kerslake	Ozzy Osbourne (1981)	4:21
9.	"The Trooper"	Harris	Iron Maiden (1983)	3:53
10.	"Breaking the Law"	Halford, Downing, Tipton	Judas Priest (1980)	3:02
11.	"On Fire"	E. Van Halen, A. Van Halen, Anthony, Roth	Van Halen (1978)	3:08
12.	"Immigrant Song"	Page, Plant	Led Zeppelin (1970)	2:18
13.	"God"	M. Sweet	Stryper (2011)	4:55
Total length:				53:21

Track list credits reference

== Personnel ==
Stryper

- Michael Sweet – lead vocals, backing vocals, guitars
- Oz Fox – guitars, backing vocals
- Tim Gaines – bass, backing vocals
- Robert Sweet – drums, cymbals

Additional musicians

- Charles Foley – keyboards, acoustic piano, organ, backing vocals
- Jonathan Donais – additional backing vocals on "God"
- Maria Ellena Leone – additional backing vocals on "God"

== Production ==
- Bill Edwards – executive producer
- Michael Sweet – producer
- Danny Bernini – recording, mixing
- Kenny Lewis – editing
- Mark Donahue – mastering
- Kaeli Ellis – graphic design, illustrations
- Richie "Britley" Hughes – art direction
- Chris Parks – cover illustration
- Union Entertainment Group – management
- Recorded, Edited and Mixed at Sound House Music (Northampton, Massachusetts).
- Mastered at Soundmirror, Inc. (Boston, Massachusetts).

== Charts ==
Chart (2011)	Peak position
US Billboard 200	175
US Christian Albums (Billboard)	9
US Independent Albums (Billboard)	23
US Top Hard Rock Albums (Billboard)	11
US Top Rock Albums (Billboard)	42
