= Against the Law (album) =

Studio album by Stryper
- Released: August 21, 1990
- Recorded: 1989
- Studios: Music Grinder and Record Plant (Hollywood, California); Devonshire Sound Studios (North Hollywood, California)
- Genres: Glam metal; hard rock; heavy metal
- Length: 45:19
- Label: Enigma
- Producer: Tom Werman

Stryper chronology
In God We Trust (1988)	Against the Law (1990)	Can't Stop the Rock (1991)

Singles from Against the Law
- 1. "Shining Star" / "Rock The Hell Out Of You" Released: 1990; 2. "Two Time Woman" Released: 1991

Professional ratings
Review scores
Source	Rating
AllMusic	3/5 stars
Select	2/5 medals
Jesus Freak Hideout	4/5 stars

Against the Law is the fifth studio album from the Christian metal band Stryper, released on August 21, 1990. Three singles and videos were released for this album including "Shining Star" (an Earth, Wind & Fire cover), "Two Time Woman" and "Lady" but received minimal airplay.

This album marked a change in the musical and visual direction of the band. Gone were the yellow and black spandex outfits, the bold evangelical lyrics and the original band logo with Isaiah 53:5. In their place were leather outfits, and lyrics more focused on rock n' roll and relationships, although arguably from a Christian worldview. The album sold poorly compared to the band's previous gold and platinum releases.

== Track listing ==
All songs by Michael Sweet except where noted.

1. "Against the Law" – 3:49
2. "Two Time Woman" – 3:40
3. "Rock the People" – 3:34
4. "Two Bodies (One Mind, One Soul)" – 5:17
5. "Not That Kind of Guy" – 3:59
6. "Shining Star" (Philip Bailey, Larry Dunn, Maurice White) – 4:22
7. "Ordinary Man" – 3:51
8. "Lady" – 4:53
9. "Caught in the Middle" – 3:48
10. "All for One" – 4:31
11. "Rock the Hell Out of You" – 3:35

== Personnel ==
Stryper

- Michael Sweet – lead vocals, backing vocals, guitars
- Oz Fox – lead guitars, backing vocals
- Tim Gaines – bass (except 6), backing vocals
- Robert Sweet – drums

Additional musicians

- John Purdell – keyboards
- Brent Jeffers – additional keyboards
- Randy Jackson – bass (6)
- Tom Werman – percussion
- Jeff Scott Soto – backing vocals

== Production ==
- Tom Werman – producer
- John Guarnieri – A&R direction
- Jacqui Randle – A&R administration
- Eddie DeLena – recording, mixing
- Mike Bosley – assistant engineer
- Lawrence Ethan – assistant engineer
- Buzz Morrows – assistant engineer, mix assistant
- Patrick Pending – art direction
- Rudy Tuesday – art direction, design
- David Perry – special photo printing
- Ed Colver – still life photography
- Neil Zlozower – band photography
- Jeannine Pinkerton – typesetting
- Kyle Tucy Sweet – make-up
- Fleur Thiemeyer – wardrobe

== Alternative versions ==
The limited-edition cover artwork for Against the Law

A limited-edition version of the album was also released that included a 14-minute interview with the band.

== Title of the album ==
Tim Gaines said the album was titled Against the Law because it was, "our response to these religious folks who Christ said "They swallow a camel and strain on a gnat." In other words: in response to the criticism from Christians protesting against them.

== Charts ==
Chart (1990)	Peak position
Japanese Albums (Oricon)	92
US Billboard 200	39
US Top Christian Albums (Billboard)	25
