= To Hell with the Devil =

Studio album by Stryper
- Released: October 24, 1986
- Studios: Master Control (Burbank, California)
- Genres: Glam metal; Christian metal
- Length: 41:10
- Label: Enigma
- Producers: Stephan Galfas and Stryper

Stryper chronology
Soldiers Under Command (1985)	To Hell with the Devil (1986)	In God We Trust (1988)

Singles from To Hell with the Devil
- 1. "Calling on You" Released: 1986; 2. "Free" Released: 1986; 3. "All of Me" Released: 1986; 4. "To Hell with the Devil" Released: 1986; 5. "Honestly" Released: 1987

Alternative Cover

Professional ratings
Review scores
Source	Rating
AllMusic	4/5 stars
Jesus Freak Hideout	5/5 stars

To Hell with the Devil is the third studio album by the Christian metal band Stryper, released in 1986. It was the first Christian metal album to achieve platinum status, selling over one million copies. It remained the best-selling Christian metal album until P.O.D.'s Satellite in 2001.

Within nine weeks of its October 1986 release, the album had entered the national Top 40 and was approaching gold certification, making it the best-selling album in the Enigma Records' catalogue to date. Robert Sweet attributed the album's ambition to the success of their first album, Soldiers Under Command: "This one was easier in a sense because we had more money to do it. But it was harder in one sense because we worked with a co-producer Stephan Galfas, who was always sending us back to do it again, to do whatever we could to make it perfect."

The album was listed at No. 88 in the 2001 book, CCM Presents: The 100 Greatest Albums in Christian Music. The album was the only heavy metal album on the list. Ian Christe, author of the heavy metal history book Sound of the Beast: The Complete Headbanging History of Heavy Metal (2003), mentions To Hell with the Devil in his book as one of the landmarks of the glam metal movement. Throughout 1987, both music videos for "Free" and "Honestly" ranked No. 1 on Dial MTV, the daily MTV list of most requested videos. The first single/video for "Calling on You" also reached No. 2 on the show. "Honestly" was the biggest single from the record, peaking at #23 on Billboard's Hot 100 Singles Chart.

The original artwork depicted four long-haired angels (closely resembling the band members) throwing the devil into a fiery pit. The cover was then changed on later pressings to a basic black cover with the Stryper logo and the album title in the center.

According to Michael Sweet's autobiography, as the band started to record the album, Michael felt Tim Gaines wasn't the right bassist for the record. He was replaced by bassist Matt Hurich, who ultimately didn't work out. So session bassist Brad Cobb took Gaines' place while recording the album. However, before the tour began, Sweet asked Gaines to rejoin, as he felt it wasn't right to perform as "Stryper" without him.

In 2010, HM Magazine listed To Hell with the Devil No. 3 on its Top 100 Christian Rock Albums of All Time list, stating that "when this album broke, it went multi-platinum, forever raising the ceiling of what heavy Christian music could do." Heaven's Metal fanzine ranked it No. 6 on its Top 100 Christian metal albums of all-time list.

== Track listing ==
All tracks are written by Michael Sweet, except where noted.

Side A
No.	Title	Writer(s)	Length
1.	"Abyss (To Hell with the Devil)"		1:21
2.	"To Hell with the Devil"	M. Sweet; Robert Sweet	4:08
3.	"Calling on You"		3:59
4.	"Free"	M. Sweet; R. Sweet	3:44
5.	"Honestly"		4:20
6.	"The Way"	Oz Fox	3:37

Side B
No.	Title	Length
1.	"Sing-Along Song"	4:21
2.	"Holding On"	4:16
3.	"Rockin' the World"	3:30
4.	"All of Me"	3:11
5.	"More Than a Man"	4:35

== Personnel ==
Stryper

- Michael Sweet – lead vocals, backing vocals, lead guitars, acoustic guitar, arrangements
- Oz Fox – guitars, backing vocals
- Robert Sweet – drums

Additional musicians

- John Van Tongeren – keyboards
- Brad Cobb – bass guitar

== Production ==
- Oz Fox – producer
- Michael Sweet – producer
- Robert Sweet – producer, cover concept
- Stephan Galfas – producer, arrangements, engineer
- Dan Nebanzal – engineer
- Gary Myerberg – technical assistant
- Eddy Schreyer – mastering at Capitol Mastering (Hollywood, California)
- Brian Ayuso – art direction, design
- Ray Brown – costume design
- Annamaria DiSanto – photography
- Anna Revenge – photography
- Neil Zlozower – photography
- Suzan Carson – photography assistant
- Kyle Rae Sweet – make-up artist
- Janice Sweet – management

== Singles ==
- "Free"/"Calling on You" - released February 10, 1987 (Enigma Records 75001)
- "Honestly"/"Sing-Along Song" - released August 10, 1987 (Enigma 75009)

== Videos ==
- "Calling On You"
- "Free"
- "Honestly"
- "All of Me" (on the documentary Stryper: In the Beginning)

== Charts ==
Chart (1986–87)	Peak position
Canada Top Albums/CDs (RPM)	89
Swedish Albums (Sverigetopplistan)	43
US Billboard 200	32
US Top Christian Albums (Billboard)	3

== Certifications ==
Region	Certification	Certified units/sales
Canada (Music Canada)	Gold	50,000^{^}
United States (RIAA)	Platinum	1,000,000^{^}
^{^} Shipments figures based on certification alone.
