= God Damn Evil =

Studio album by Stryper
- Released: April 20, 2018
- Recorded: 2017–2018
- Genre: Christian metal; heavy metal; hard rock
- Length: 44:46
- Label: Frontiers
- Producer: Michael Sweet

Stryper chronology
Fallen (2015)	God Damn Evil (2018)	Even the Devil Believes (2020)

Singles from God Damn Evil
- 1. "The Valley" Released: 2018; 2. "Sorry" Released: 2018; 3. "Lost" Released: 2018; 4. "Take It to the Cross" Released: 2018

God Damn Evil is the seventeenth release and twelfth studio album by Christian metal band Stryper, produced by frontman Michael Sweet and released on April 20, 2018. Bass guitar was played by John O'Boyle as current bassist Perry Richardson could not due to scheduling conflicts.

== Critical reception ==
Professional ratings
Review scores
Source	Rating
AllMusic	3/5 stars
CCM Magazine	4/5 stars
Jesus Freak Hideout	3.5/5 stars
Sonic Perspectives	8.3/10

Awarding the album four stars from CCM Magazine, Matt Connor writes, "Their unapologetic approach to stay true to their now classic rock/metal roots rewards longtime fans." Andie Hardee, giving the album three and a half stars at Jesus Freak Hideout, states, "As impressive as the musicianship is, the songs themselves are also enjoyable." Rating the album an 8.3 out of 10 by Sonic Perspectives, Alan Cox says, "Stryper is rocking so hard and well that even some close-minded skeptics are bound to be converted." Wayne Parry, reviewing for The Washington Post, responds, "At an age where many heavy metal wailers dial it back due to the strains of decades of high notes, singer and guitarist Michael Sweet doubles down on his other worldly vocals."

The name of the album has been the source of controversy and has caused some Christian music retailers and even Walmart to not stock physical CDs in their stores. Michael Sweet has responded by saying, "We're disappointed. Stryper has always been about making people think outside the box. Our new album title, God Damn Evil, is a statement that's needed in our society. We've seen evil rise to new levels and this title is simply a prayer request asking God to damn or condemn all the evil around us. Many chains have joined us in making such a statement. Walmart, unfortunately, has not. The odd thing is of all the chains out there we assumed Walmart would be one to understand exactly what our point and purpose is. Unfortunately not. Although we respect their decision and what's done is done, it's frustrating to see something that's meant for good get misinterpreted and misunderstood."

== Track listing ==
No.	Title	Length
1.	"Take It to the Cross"	4:53
2.	"Sorry"	3:53
3.	"Lost"	3:44
4.	"God Damn Evil"	4:05
5.	"You Don't Even Know Me"	4:10
6.	"The Valley"	4:13
7.	"Sea of Thieves"	3:40
8.	"Beautiful"	4:03
9.	"Can't Live Without Your Love"	4:43
10.	"Own Up"	3:43
11.	"The Devil Doesn't Live Here"	3:23
Total length:		44:30

Japanese edition
No.	Title	Length
12.	"Can't Live Without Your Love" (alternate version)

Japanese tour edition
No.	Title	Length
12.	"Can't Live Without Your Love" (alternate version)
13.	"Loud 'N' Clear" (1983 Demo)
14.	"Co'mon Rock" (1983 Demo)

== Personnel ==
Stryper

- Michael Sweet – lead vocals, lead guitars
- Robert Sweet – drums, backing vocals
- Oz Fox – lead guitars, backing vocals

Additional personnel

- Charles Foley – backing vocals
- John O'Boyle – bass guitar
- Paul McNamara – keyboards, synthesizer (Moog), backing vocals on "God Damn Evil"
- Danny Bernini – percussion, recording and engineering
- Matthew Bachand – death growl on "Take It to the Cross"
- Tyler Murello – backing vocals on "God Damn Evil"
- Kenny Lewis - additional editing

== Charts ==
Chart (2018)	Peak position
Belgian Albums (Ultratop Wallonia)	138
Dutch Albums (Album Top 100)	186
Swiss Albums (Schweizer Hitparade)	30
UK Rock & Metal Albums (OCC)	17
US Billboard 200	77
US Christian Albums (Billboard)	2
US Independent Albums (Billboard)	5
US Top Album Sales (Billboard)	15
US Top Hard Rock Albums (Billboard)	3
US Top Rock Albums (Billboard)	6
