= 7: The Best of Stryper =

Greatest hits album by Stryper
- Released: March 25, 2003
- Genre: Christian metal, glam metal, heavy metal
- Label: Hollywood
- Producer: Oz Fox and Michael Sweet

Stryper chronology
Can't Stop the Rock (1991)	7: The Best of Stryper (2003)	7 Weeks: Live in America, 2003 (2004)

Professional ratings
Review scores
Source	Rating
Allmusic	4/5 stars
PiercingMetal	10/10 stars

7: The Best of Stryper is the seventh release and second compilation album by Christian metal band Stryper. Released in 2003, it is the second compilation album produced by the band, and its recording and release led to the reunion of the original members of the band.

Hollywood Records asked the members of Stryper to record new tracks to be placed in a compilation album celebrating the 20th anniversary of the band. Frontman Michael Sweet wrote two new songs that were recorded by the original 4 members of the group. This marked the first time in 12 years that Stryper recorded together in the studio.

After the release of the album, the band went on a 36 show reunion tour, their first in 12 years. Shows were recorded for the live album 7 Weeks: Live in America, 2003, which was released on May 18, 2004.

== Track listing ==
1. Something (new track)
2. For You (new track)
3. Shining Star (from Against the Law)
4. Lady (from Against the Law)
5. All for One (from Against the Law)
6. In God We Trust (from In God We Trust)
7. Always There for You (from In God We Trust)
8. To Hell with the Devil (from To Hell with the Devil)
9. Calling On You (from To Hell with the Devil)
10. Free (from To Hell with the Devil)
11. Honestly (from To Hell with the Devil)
12. The Way (from To Hell with the Devil)
13. Soldiers Under Command (from Soldiers Under Command)
14. Makes Me Wanna Sing (from Soldiers Under Command)
15. Reach Out (from Soldiers Under Command)
16. From Wrong to Right (from The Yellow & Black Attack)
17. Loving You (from The Yellow & Black Attack)
18. Believe (from Can't Stop the Rock)
