= Can't Stop the Rock =

Compilation album by Stryper
- Released: July 20, 1991
- Genre: Christian metal
- Length: 52:20
- Label: Hollywood
- Producer: Various

Stryper chronology
Against the Law (1990)	Can't Stop the Rock (1991)	7: The Best of Stryper (2003)

Professional ratings
Review scores
Source	Rating
AllMusic	3.5/5 stars

Can't Stop the Rock is the sixth release, and first compilation album, from the Christian metal band Stryper, released in 1991.

The album features two new songs, one of which is "Believe", dedicated to American troops fighting in the Persian Gulf War that same year. In February 1992, lead singer Michael Sweet left to pursue a solo career, which marked the end of the original Stryper lineup until they reunited in 2003.

== Track listing ==
1. "Believe" [new track] (Michael Sweet) – 3:57
2. "Can't Stop the Rock" [new track] (Richard Oderbagen, M. Sweet, Robert Sweet) – 3:18
3. "Soldiers Under Command" (M. Sweet, R. Sweet) – 5:03
4. "Free" (M. Sweet, R. Sweet) – 3:41
5. "Always There for You" (M. Sweet) – 4:11
6. "Lady" (Stryper) – 4:53
7. "To Hell with the Devil" (M. Sweet, R. Sweet) – 4:07
8. "In God We Trust" (M. Sweet, R. Sweet) – 3:58
9. "Honestly" (M. Sweet) – 4:08
10. "Two Bodies (One Mind, One Soul)"(M. Sweet) – 5:15
11. "Together as One" (M. Sweet) – 5:01
12. "You Know What to Do" (Oz Fox, Tim Gaines, M. Sweet, R. Sweet) – 4:48
