= The Heavy Metal Box =

Heavy Metal Box

Box set by various artists
- Released: 20 November 2007
- Genres: Heavy metal, hard rock
- Length: 4 CD's
- Label: Rhino

The Heavy Metal Box is a CD box set with heavy metal / rock songs from various artists and bands. It was released by Rhino Records in 2007.

The box set begins with early heavy metal, to the NWOBHM and 1980s glam and thrash metal and ends with the extreme and alternative metal of the 2000s.

== Track listing ==
=== Disc one ===
1. Iron Butterfly – "In-A-Gadda-Da-Vida"
2. Blue Cheer – "Summertime Blues"
3. Uriah Heep – "Easy Livin'"
4. Deep Purple – "Highway Star"
5. Alice Cooper – "Billion Dollar Babies"
6. Hawkwind – "Lost Johnny"
7. Montrose – "Bad Motor Scooter"
8. Rush – "Working Man"
9. Rainbow – "Man on the Silver Mountain"
10. Kiss – "Detroit Rock City"
11. Judas Priest – "The Ripper"
12. Ted Nugent – "Cat Scratch Fever"
13. UFO – "Lights Out"
14. Blue Öyster Cult – "Godzilla"
15. Girlschool – "Demolition Boys"
16. Angel Witch – "White Witch"
17. Iron Maiden – "The Phantom of the Opera"
18. Black Sabbath – "Neon Knights"

=== Disc two ===
1. Motörhead – "Ace of Spades"
2. Diamond Head – "Am I Evil?"
3. Rose Tattoo – "Nice Boys"
4. Michael Schenker Group – "Attack of the Mad Axeman"
5. Saxon – "Denim and Leather"
6. Blitzkrieg – "Blitzkrieg"
7. Tygers of Pan Tang – "Gangland"
8. Venom – "Witching Hour"
9. Judas Priest – "You've Got Another Thing Comin'"
10. Iron Maiden – "The Number of the Beast"
11. Raven – "Star War"
12. Fastway – "Say What You Will"
13. Mercyful Fate – "Black Funeral"
14. W.A.S.P. – "Animal (F**k Like a Beast)"
15. Y&T – "Mean Streak"
16. Dio – "Holy Diver"
17. Queensrÿche – "Queen of the Reich"
18. Metallica – "Whiplash"

=== Disc three ===
1. Scorpions – "Rock You Like a Hurricane"
2. Quiet Riot – "Metal Health"
3. Dokken – "Into the Fire"
4. Accept – "Balls to the Wall"
5. Ratt – "Round and Round"
6. Twisted Sister – "I Wanna Rock"
7. Hanoi Rocks – "The Boulevard of Broken Dreams"
8. Spinal Tap – "Big Bottom"
9. Krokus – "Midnite Maniac"
10. Yngwie J. Malmsteen's Rising Force – "I'll See the Light, Tonight"
11. Loudness – "Crazy Nights"
12. Cinderella – "Shake Me"
13. Metal Church – "Watch the Children Pray"
14. Stryper – "To Hell with the Devil"
15. Helloween – "A Little Time"
16. Overkill – "Wrecking Crew"
17. Anthrax – "Caught in a Mosh"
18. Megadeth – "Peace Sells"

=== Disc four ===
1. Whitesnake – "Still of the Night"
2. Great White – "Rock Me"
3. Poison – "Talk Dirty to Me"
4. Faster Pussycat – "Bathroom Wall"
5. Savatage – "Hall of the Mountain King"
6. Lita Ford – "Kiss Me Deadly"
7. Manowar – "Hail and Kill"
8. Testament – "Trial by Fire"
9. King Diamond – "Welcome Home"
10. Slayer – "South of Heaven"
11. Metallica – "One"
12. Living Colour – "Cult of Personality"
13. Skid Row – "Youth Gone Wild"
14. Pantera – "Cowboys from Hell"
15. Prong – "Beg to Differ"
16. Sepultura – "Dead Embryonic Cells"
