= Angeles (band) =

American rock band from Los Angeles

- Origin: Los Angeles, United States
- Genres: Glam rock, hard rock
- Years active: 1977–1991, 1995–present
- Labels: Mystic (1983-1986); Azra Records (1986-1989); Bongo Boy Records; Dark Star Records (2019)
- Members: Dale Lytle; Danny Basulto; Bill Wildman
- Past members: Bryan Potter; Dave Raudman; Tom Leslie; John Merritt; John Azar; Brian LeBoeuf; Clare Diane; Daphney Winters; Vince Thrill
- Website: angelesband.com

Angeles is an American rock band from Los Angeles, formed in 1977 by Dale Lytle. They were signed to Mystic Records, who released their debut album in 1984. As of 2020, Angeles has released thirteen albums.

== History ==
=== Early history (1975–1983) ===
The roots of Angeles can be traced to 1975 when Dale Lytle and Dave Raudman started the band "Avante-Gard", the band's name was changed to "English" in 1976, before finally settling with "Angeles" in mid-1977. The band was named after the Angeles National Forest. The initial line-up of Angeles was a five-piece: Dale Lytle on guitar, Dave Raudman on vocals, Terrell Hill on drums, Frank Galante on Bass, and Jen Nicia Alcivar on keyboard. On May 31, 1978, Angeles recorded a setlist of seven songs intended for their first-album; this cassette was considered lost for more than 40 years until it was discovered in 2019, and then released on vinyl in 2020. On October 4, 1980, Angeles headlined the Fall Rock Festival at Devonshire Downs; Ron Bushy, the original drummer of Iron Butterfly, joined the band onstage. On August 1, 1981, Angeles and Mötley Crüe co-headlined two concerts at The Troubadour.

=== First three albums (1984–1991) ===
After signing to Mystic Records in 1984, they released their debut album We're no Angels; Hit Parader described the album as "a tight powerful collection of metal anthems" that "manages to elicit plenty of excitement on tracks such as 'Nasty Girls' and 'No Sugar Tonight'." The title of the album We're No Angels, was decided by Kevin DuBrow, vocalist of Quiet Riot. In 1984, Angeles opened up for Bon Jovi at the Reseda Country Club, alongside Stryper.. Their second album Give It Up was released on the infamous Azra Records in 1986. In 1989, their third album Delivering the Goods was released on Ace Records. The band broke up in 1991, after releasing three albums.

=== Reunion (1994–2011) ===
Rock City (Vol. 16 No. 24) with the 1994-1999 lineup of the band Angeles

In 1994, Angeles reformed with new singer Bryan Potter, Rhythm Guitarist Pat Schea (Schee), Bass Guitarist Marty Nelson and Drummer Chuck Landon "Isquith". Using footage from a sold-out show at The Roxy, two music videos were released: "Party Til Ya Puke" and "Forgotten Souls". On 2010, "September 21st, 1996" was released on vinyl. By late 1996, Brian LeBoeuf became the new vocalist.

=== Vocalists Fallon Naccarato and Daphne Winters (2011–2014) ===
In February 2011, Fallon Naccarato made her vocal debut with Angeles. In January 2013, while playing a Make-A-Wish Foundation benefit concert, Angeles was joined onstage by Gary Richrath who was best known as the lead guitarist and a songwriter for the band REO Speedwagon from 1970 until 1989. A 15th-anniversary edition of No Limits was released on 2013, with entirely new vocals, removed rhythm guitar tracks, and a different tracklist. January 4, 2014, Angeles began recording what would become the album Seriously Fun. On January 22, Denise Fallon Naccarato, the singer of Angeles, was killed in a motorcycle accident.

On February 1, 2014, Dale Lytle and vocalist Daphne Winters recorded an improvised song together titled "Tell Me Why". With Angeles as part of the lineup, KMET hosted a benefit concert for Pat Paraquat Kelley; with an unannounced guest-appearance by Slash.

=== Vocalist Claire Diane (2014–2017) ===
On December 28, 2014, Clare Diane joined as vocalist; best known for her album Runaway (2003), as well as vocalist for Fem Zeppelin, an all-female Led Zeppelin tribute band. October 23, 2015, Angeles' drummer of 25 years, John Merritt, was killed in an automobile accident as well. Danny Basulto took over as drummer. Crazy (2016) was released on Rock Avenue Records. The music video for "God Country and King" reached more than 1,000,000 views on Vevo. The August 2017 edition of TalentRaters Magazine had Angeles as the cover-story detailing the release of their album Killers of the Game. A music video for the title-track was released

=== Recent events (2018–present) ===
On December 28, 2018, Rik Fox made his bass playing debut with the band at the Whisky a Go Go; he parted with the band shortly after. In early 2019, Angeles signed to Dark Star Records, where they have released two full albums. Angeles opened for the band Angel for their record release show of Risen on October 4, 2019; also this was the record release show for Angeles' Fire It Up. Angeles' set was reviewed in Music Connection's December 2019 Issue; described as a "wonderful, powerful blend of classic, bluesy rock& roll and power-metal" but the article did discuss how the band was never able to "take that next step". In September 2023, Angeles released a music video for "Crimes of Insanity" featuring Bill Wildman on bass.

== Discography ==
=== Albums ===
- We're no Angels (1984)
- Give it up (1986)
- Delivering the Goods (1989)
- No Limits (1997)
- Miracles (2007)
- Seriously Fun (2014)
- Wild Ride (2015)
- Crazy (2016)
- Killers of the Game (2017)
- Test of Time (2018)
- Time of Truth (2018)
- Fire It Up (2019)
- May 31, 1978 (2020)
- Hell On High Heels (2020)
- Running Like An Outlaw (2022)

== Band members ==
Current members

- Dale Lytle – lead vocals/guitar (1977–1991, 1994–present)
- Danny Basulto – drums (2015–present)
- Bill Wildman - bass/vocals 2023–present

Former members

- Louis Collins - vocals (2020–2021)
- Cal Shelton - bass (2015–2020)
- Dave Raudman – lead vocals (1977–1991)
- Bryan Potter - Lead Vocals & keyboard (1994-1996)
- Brian LeBoeuf - lead vocals (1996-1998)
- Mark Delpapa - lead vocals
- Clare Diane - lead vocals
- Daphney Winters - lead vocals
- Fallon Naccarato - lead vocals
- Vince Thrill – lead vocals
- Daniel Ferreira - lead vocals
- Gwendolyn Casella - lead vocals
- Frank Galante - bass (1977–1979)
- Tom Leslie – bass, backing vocals
- Terell Hill - drums (1977-1979)
- Tony Casella - drums (1977)
- Paul DelBoccio - drums (1980-1983)
- John Merritt – drums, backing vocals (died 2015)
- John Azar – bass, backing vocals
- A.J. Zalampous "Dimitri Antoniades" - bass (1996-1998)
- Rik Fox – bass guitar (2018)
- Pat Schea (Schee) - rhythm guitar (1994-1999) (2012-2014)
- Jen Nicia Alcivar - keyboard (1977-1978)
- Mark Harrington (1978)
- Chuck "Landon" Isquith - Drums (1994-1996)
- Marty Nelson - Bass Guitar (1994-1996)

Timeline
