= Honestly (Stryper song) =

Single by Stryper

from the album To Hell with the Devil
- B-side: "Sing-Along Song"; "Loving You" (live in Japan)
- Released: 1987
- Recorded: 1986
- Genre: Glam metal; Christian metal; hard rock; pop rock
- Label: Enigma
- Songwriter: Michael Sweet

Stryper singles chronology
| "Free/Calling on You" (1986) | "Honestly" (1987) | "Always There for You" (1988) |

"Honestly" is a power ballad by the American Christian metal band Stryper. The song was the band's fifth single and their highest charting on the Billboard Hot 100. It became one of the most requested songs on MTV. "Honestly" is one of Stryper's best-known songs, peaking at No. 23 on the Billboard Hot 100, and remains as the band's only top 40 hit on that chart.

== Track listing ==
1. "Honestly"
2. "Sing-Along Song"
3. "Loving You" (live in Japan)

== Charts ==
Weekly chart performance for "Honestly"
| Chart (1987–1988) | Peak position |
|---|---|
| US Billboard Hot 100 | 23 |
| US Christian Rock Airplay (CCM) | 13 |
