= Stryper =

American heavy metal band

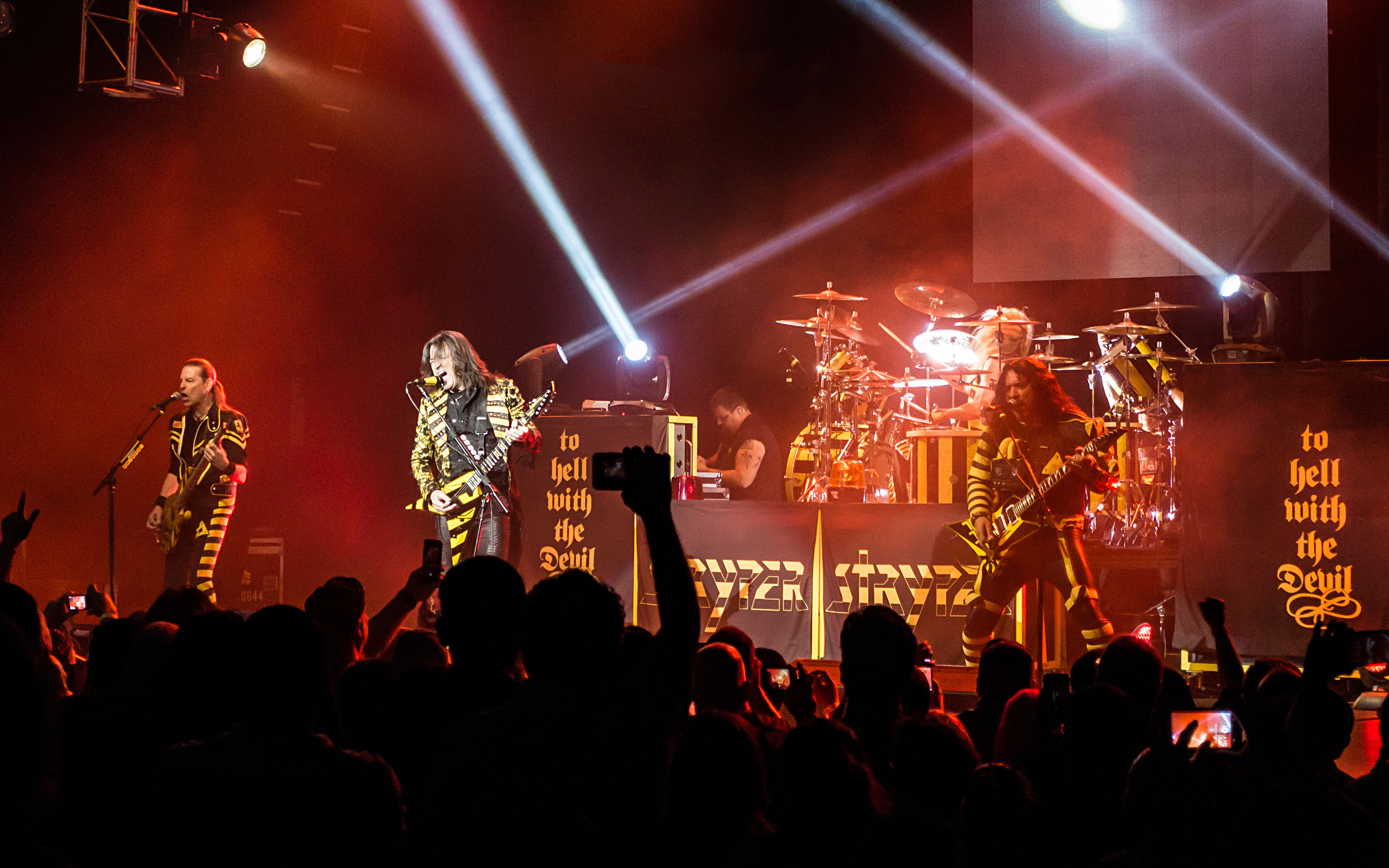
- Stryper performing in 2016

Background information
- Also known as: Roxx Regime (1981–1983)
- Origin: La Mirada, California, U.S.
- Genres: Heavy metal; glam metal; hard rock; Christian metal
- Years active: 1981–1993; 1999–2001; 2003–present
- Labels: Enigma; Hollywood; Big3; Frontiers
- Members: Michael Sweet; Robert Sweet; Oz Fox; Perry Richardson
- Past members: Tim Gaines; Eric Johnson; John Voorhees; Matt Hurich; Kenneth Givens; Charlene Givens; Kenny Metcalf; Tracy Ferrie
- Website: stryper.com

Stryper is an American heavy metal band, recognized as the first with overtly Christian lyrics to gain mainstream acceptance. The group's lineup consists of Michael Sweet (lead vocals, guitar), Oz Fox (guitar, backing vocals), Perry Richardson (bass, backing vocals), and Robert Sweet (drums).

Formed in 1981 as Roxx Regime, the band changed their musical message to reflect their Christian beliefs and became Stryper in 1983. Signing with independent label Enigma Records, they released their debut extended play, The Yellow and Black Attack, in 1984. In the mid-1980s, Stryper enjoyed their most successful period beginning with the release of To Hell with the Devil, which was certified Platinum by the RIAA. Stryper went on to release two more Gold-certified albums before disbanding in 1993.

In 2003, Stryper came out of retirement for a reunion tour and subsequently signed a multi-album contract with Big3 Records in 2005. In 2013, they signed a multi-album deal with Frontiers Records and have since released Second Coming in 2013, which includes 14 re-recorded songs from their first three albums, No More Hell to Pay in 2013, Fallen in 2015, God Damn Evil in 2018, Even the Devil Believes in 2020, The Final Battle in 2022, When We Were Kings, To Hell with the Amps, their first acoustic album, in 2024, The Greatest Gift of All, their first christmas album, in 2025, and Throne of Thorns in 2026.

Over the course of their career, Stryper has placed thirteen albums in the Top 10 of Billboard's Top Christian Albums chart, with five releases peaking at number 2 and one release—Even the Devil Believes—reaching number 1. The band was described by the Los Angeles Times as the best-selling rock band in Orange County from 1984 to 1990, with five albums during that period selling near or above 500,000 copies.

== Name ==
At Enigma Records' suggestion, the band abandoned their initial name Roxx Regime and adopted the name Stryper. The word 'Stryper' references a passage in Isaiah 53, "with his stripes we are healed", which is frequently incorporated into the band's logo. According to Michael Sweet, the name was conceived while the band was rehearsing in a garage with striped walls and striped equipment, and was deliberately spelled with a y to avoid resemblance to the word "stripper". Stryper's drummer, Robert Sweet, added that it made him "think of 'hyper' and that's good, we want to make the show as crazy as possible onstage." Robert also created a backronym for their name: "Salvation Through Redemption, Yielding Peace, Encouragement, and Righteousness".

== History ==
=== Early history (1977–1983) ===
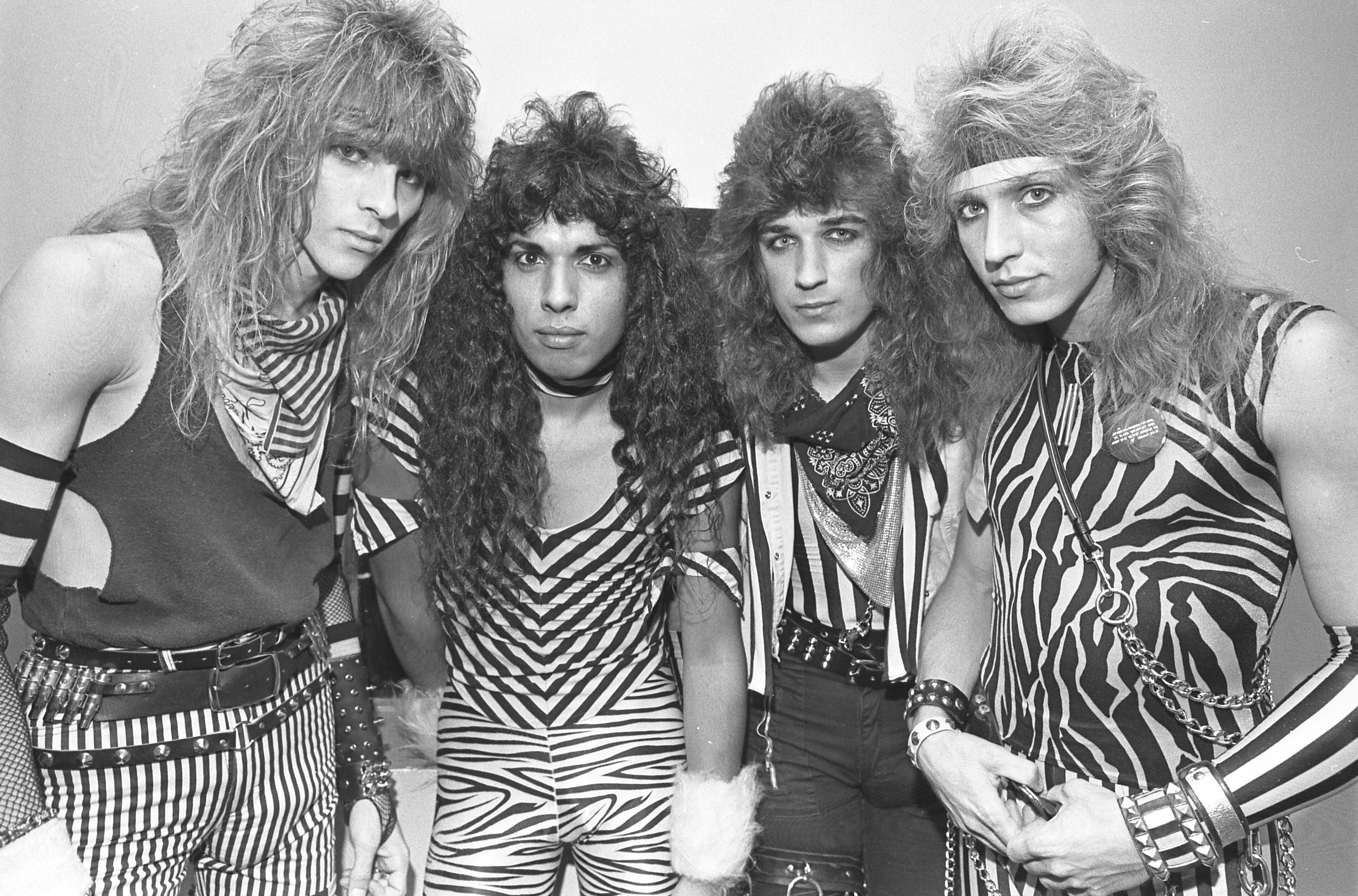
Stryper in 1984

In the book Nöthin' But a Good Time, Stryper drummer Robert Sweet recalled how he and Michael Sweet began playing music together around 1977, noting the dynamic between them: "I knew my brother could sing. I had a lot of people coming to me, saying, 'You two as brothers have something that's kind of unique, you vibe off one another.' And I'd seen it with other brothers, like the Van Halens." Robert and Michael initially performed under the band names Firestorm and Aftermath before briefly joining forces with a local guitarist and his band Roxx; Robert Sweet appended "Regime" to the name after discovering another act called Roxx.

Upon forming in 1981, Roxx Regime was composed of Michael Sweet on lead vocals and lead guitar, Robert Sweet on drums, and Eric Johnson on bass. Oz Fox eventually joined the band, but before he did, a number of guitarists almost joined instead, including Doug Aldrich (later of Dio) and C.C. DeVille (later of Poison). Fox and Robert Sweet attended Katherine Edwards Junior High School and became friends when studying in Pioneer High School. Bassist Tim Gaines joined in 1983, having previously played with Los Angeles-based hard rock band Stormer. According to Michael Sweet, the band noticed Gaines had disappeared from Stormer's promotional photographs in BAM Magazine and telephoned his home to enquire about hiring him. Gaines' mother told them he had left the band after becoming a Christian; his father was a Presbyterian preacher. Gaines joined without a formal audition.

The band performed in Los Angeles on the Sunset Strip circuit alongside such acts as Mötley Crüe, Ratt, and Quiet Riot. Rolling Stone's retrospective timeline of the Sunset Strip scene lists Roxx Regime among the house bands that regularly performed at Gazzarri's alongside Ratt. The band were regarded by peers as one of a small number of acts that, in the words of Ratt frontman Stephen Pearcy, "really kickstarted things" on the Strip alongside Ratt, Mötley Crüe, W.A.S.P., Quiet Riot, and Great White. In August 1982, Metallica shared the bill with Roxx Regime at the Bruin Den in Long Beach, California. Although the Sweet brothers had accepted Christianity in their youth, their immersion in the Sunset Strip club scene had led them away from practising their faith. Michael Sweet recollected standing outside Gazzarri's when members of Arthur Blessitt's folks walked down Sunset Boulevard carrying a wooden cross, preaching to people on the Strip: "I was one of the guys that they preached to. Here I am knowing that what they're saying is true, at least according to my beliefs. But at the same time I'm standing there with a drink in my hand smoking a cigarette and talking to Stephen Pearcy. So I wasn't living the life." Around 1983, Robert Sweet told the band: "Guys, this is how it's got to be." Michael Sweet recalled the moment: "It was an easy thing for us to say, 'All right, let's do it.' We said a prayer, we started rewriting lyrics, and from that day forward, we changed everything and went down a different path." According to Michael Sweet's autobiography, the band's 1983 rededication to Christianity was catalysed by a visit from Kenny Metcalf, a keyboardist who had recently become a Christian himself, to a Roxx Regime rehearsal. Metcalf reportedly told the band that if they devoted themselves fully to God, "He's going to take you places you've never dreamed of." Metcalf later served as the band's keyboardist for a period during this era. A 1986 feature in People magazine documented Metcalf praying with the band before a Seattle performance, describing him as "the friend who helped persuade them to rock for God."

Robert Sweet described the band's pre-conversion identity to Billboard in 1985: "We had the complete Southern California look, right down to the chains and flames and lipstick. There certainly wasn't any Christian slant to our music." He explained that the Enigma Records relationship predated the name change: "We'd been taking a demo by Enigma Records for months... After we decided to become Stryper, we went back and re-wrote all of the lyrics. Boy! Was Enigma surprised. But by then they were sold on our sound and our look."

Reflecting in 2022 on the band's origins, Michael Sweet identified this sequence as central to Stryper's identity: "We were very different in the sense that we were a rock band on the Hollywood scene that became Christians. We weren't Christians that became a rock band." Sweet said this distinction shaped "the way we think, the way we write, the way we produce, the way we sound, the way we perform, who we perform with—everything we do."

=== The Yellow and Black Attack and Soldiers Under Command (1984–1985) ===
Following their name change, Stryper's early performances were supported by Calvary Chapel in West Covina, California, whose pastor Raul Ries helped organize a tour of high schools, colleges and churches. A Billboard article published in April 1984 described them as "the first Christian heavy metal band", positioning them as a counterpoint to the occult imagery prevalent in heavy metal at the time.

Enigma Records president Wesley Hein described the label's dual-market strategy to Billboard in 1987: "The traditional heavy metal market believed that the music was the message, and the Christian market believed the message was the message. Our approach was to affirm each camps' beliefs—we could emphasize the music to the secular fans, and the message to the Christian fans, because the band is tremendously strong in both areas." They debuted with the EP The Yellow and Black Attack on July 21, 1984. Within three months of its release, the EP had sold 25,000 copies, according to Enigma Records' Sandra Gustchem. Billboard gospel music correspondent Bob Darden listed The Yellow and Black Attack among the best Christian music releases of 1984, alongside releases by U2, Amy Grant, and Petra. Robert Sweet estimated in 1985 that most of Stryper's audiences were predominantly non-Christians, and stated: "We're a good rock band. We just happen to focus our songs on Jesus."

During mid-1980s, Stryper appeared on bills with bands including Ratt, and Bon Jovi, specifically appearing alongside Angeles on the bill for Bon Jovi's first Los Angeles performance, held on April 2, 1984, at the Country Club in Reseda, leading some fans and critics to claim that they were not a true Christian band. By April 1985, The Yellow and Black Attack had sold over 85,000 units, according to Gutschen, who noted that the label was "applying some of the industry's more mainstream marketing tools" to extend the band's popularity. Enigma also released a limited edition picture disc and 12-inch single to support the release. The debut recording was certified by Enigma in 1987 as "label's best seller to date, outdistancing stiff competition from early Mötley Crüe, Ratt and Berlin".

Stryper's first full-length album, Soldiers Under Command, released on August 23, 1985, was produced by Michael Wagener and became the band's first gold-certified record, eventually surpassing 400,000 copies in sales. The album was originally issued on white vinyl. Writing for Kerrang!, Howard Johnson described the album as musically impressive while questioning the sincerity of the band's Christian message. He praised Fox's "neat line in lead rabble-rousin'" and Wagener's "nuclear production on what is presumably a fairly low-budget affair". Soldiers Under Command debuted on the Billboard 200 on September 28, 1985, eventually peaking at number 84 and remaining on the chart for sixty-four weeks. The album's commercial success led Enigma Records to provide greater resources for Stryper's follow-up, To Hell with the Devil. Robert Sweet noted the resulting pressure: "Everybody was really expecting something good after 'Soldiers.'"

Musician Jeordie White (known as Twiggy Ramirez of Marilyn Manson) attended a Stryper concert during the Soldiers Under Command tour, recalling that the band opened with "Battle Hymn of the Republic" as a lit cross was lowered behind them, and that the show and its imagery had a lasting impression on him.

=== To Hell with the Devil and In God We Trust (1986–1989) ===
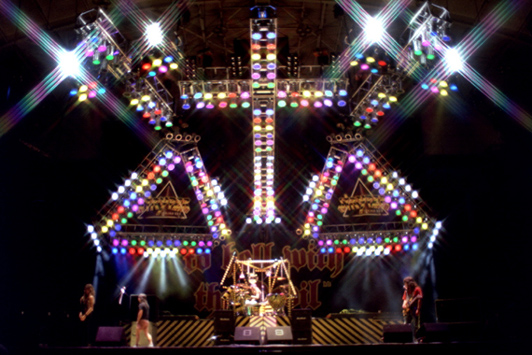
Stryper performing on the To Hell with the Devil tour in 1986

Stryper performed at the 17th Annual Dove Awards on April 10, 1986, which was televised live by the Christian Broadcasting Network and hosted by Pat Boone, Larry Gatlin, Charlene Tilton, and Tammy Wynette. Billboard described the band as "the musical hit of the evening."

Stryper's third album, To Hell with the Devil, was released on October 23, 1986. In its second week on the Billboard 200 chart the album leaped to number 39, becoming the first album by Enigma Records to enter the top 40. It achieved gold status in mid-February 1987, with "Calling On You" consistently ranking among MTV's most-requested videos and added to at least 35 radio-station playlists nationwide. The album was eventually certified platinum in the United States by the RIAA and gold in Canada by Music Canada, with combined certified sales exceeding one million copies. "Honestly" became Stryper's highest-charting song, peaking at number 23 on the Billboard Hot 100 chart. Billboard noted that the band's success has delivered a message, especially to the record industry, that "Christian metal sells". Robert Sweet distinguished Stryper's approach from other Christian rock acts, explaining that many Christian bands followed a practice of "edification of the body"—playing exclusively for Christian audiences. "Our whole idea from the start was to play for everyone," Sweet stated. "We offer an alternative side with our music, but by no means do we want to force it down anyone's throats."

In addition to being Stryper's most successful record, it was both the first contemporary Christian music and the first Christian metal album to achieve this feat. The songs "Calling on You", "Free" and "Honestly" were popular MTV hits in 1987, and "Free" and "Honestly" both became the most-requested songs on Dial MTV during their chart run. Fan-voting campaigns are credited with pressuring the network to put Stryper's songs into wider rotation. In a 2024 interview with Spin, Michael Sweet said that the band had displaced Bon Jovi, Mötley Crüe and Poison from the number-one position on Dial MTV and had remained there for weeks. DeGarmo and Key were the first American Christian band to receive airplay on MTV with their song "Six, Six, Six." Jerusalem, the Swedish Christian hard rock band, had already gained exposure on MTV in 1982, broadcasting their video "It's Mad" from the album Warrior; Billboard described it as a breakthrough for "gospel rock" on the channel. At the 30th Annual NARM Best Seller Awards in 1988, To Hell with the Devil won in the category of best-selling gospel/spiritual album, "beating traditional favorites Amy Grant (who had won the past four years), Sandi Patti, Aretha Franklin, and Al Green". The album received a Grammy Award nomination at the 30th Annual Grammy Awards (1988) for Best Gospel Performance by a Duo or Group, Choir or Chorus.

Gaines did not participate in the recording of To Hell with the Devil, and for a short period of time prior to the release of the record he was replaced by Matt Hurich, formerly bassist of Leatherwolf. Hurich was not with the band for more than a month, although he was outfitted with a yellow and black striped bass and a racing costume. According to Michael Sweet, the band felt Gaines' jazz-influenced playing style did not suit the tighter rhythmic feel they wanted for the album. A widely circulated promotional photograph from this period, often assumed to depict the band's full lineup, in fact features Hurich rather than Gaines. However, when the promotional photos for the album were being shot, Gaines returned to the band and subsequently participated in its world tour. Michael Sweet has stated the band reinstated Gaines ahead of the tour after concluding that "Stryper is Michael Sweet, Robert Sweet, Oz Fox and Tim Gaines." Brad Cobb played bass on the album.

Reviewing Stryper's performance at Washington, D.C.'s Warner Theatre, The Washington Post critic Todd Allan Yasui described the show as "a relentless attack of heavy metal thunder" and wrote that, despite the band's religious subject matter, it should become known simply as "a powerful hard rock band".

The European tour had opened with a sold-out show at Hammersmith Odeon in London, several European dates were pre-sold, and Stryper's preceding four-month US tour had been entirely sold out. The band made their Swedish debut at Göta Lejon in Stockholm on June 2, 1987, before a sold-out crowd of approximately 1,700, with tickets having sold out within a single day. In 1987, they headlined the Dynamo Open Air Festival in the Netherlands.

Stryper's fourth album, In God We Trust, released on June 28, 1988, also went gold, and the song "Always There for You" briefly entered the lower levels of the pop charts, peaking at number 71 on the Billboard Hot 100, as well as becoming another hit on MTV. The sound of the album was more pop-oriented than previous releases and a number of critics, as well as Stryper fans, criticized the record for being overproduced. Rolling Stone's Kim Neely gave the album two out of five stars, writing that "born-again Styx just doesn't wash with your average slam fan". In addition, the image of the band was moving even closer to the glam metal look of the era. The album debuted on the Billboard 200 on July 16, 1988, peaking at number 32 the following week, and remained on the chart for twenty-five weeks. The music video for "Always There for You" cost the band $260,000 of their own money, approximately $685,000 in 2023 terms, and contributed to the group eventually entering bankruptcy. The second single and video, "I Believe in You", peaked at number 88 on the Billboard Hot 100, and the third single, "Keep the Fire Burning", failed to enter the Hot 100. As with the previous album, Gaines did not participate in the recording (Cobb once again played bass) but later rejoined the group for another world tour. Michael Sweet later acknowledged that Gaines had not been invited to the recording sessions for To Hell with the Devil or In God We Trust, stating: "I took the heat for that. In reality though, the whole band made that decision, including the producer." In God We Trust garnered a Dove Award for Hard Music Album, while the title track received the award for Hard Music Song.

On March 25, 1989, Stryper became the first heavy metal band to perform in South Korea, playing to 10,000 people at Seoul's Olympic Stadium with national television coverage. The band's commercial success extended to home video with live album In the Beginning, marketed by Enigma in retail advertising alongside mainstream releases by Def Leppard, The Who, and Bon Jovi, and describing it as videos from the platinum-certified To Hell with the Devil plus interview and behind-the-scenes footage from the band's 1987 World Tour. The videocassette Live in Japan was placed at number 10 on Circus magazine's national Top 10 Music Videocassettes chart in January 1987, appearing alongside videos by Whitney Houston, Ozzy Osbourne, and Judas Priest. Live in Japan, along with In the Beginning, were certified platinum on October 5, 1989.

=== Against the Law, break-up and solo projects (1990–1999) ===
On August 21, 1990, Stryper released Against the Law, album which drastically changed the band's image and lyrical message. While their earlier albums all had yellow and black colors in the covers, and lyrics speaking of God and salvation, Against the Law featured band members in black leather clothes and had no mention of the word "God" in the lyrics at all. The band's sound was also heavier, closer to classic metal. Robert Sweet said that the change of image and sound was in response to the criticism of the previous album and an attempt to leave behind their glam metal image. The album sold poorly. This was partly due to rumors in the press (both mainstream and Christian) that Stryper's music was trending towards a more mainstream sound as their Christian faith weakened. Stryper covered Earth Wind & Fire's 1975 song "Shining Star", which also received mixed response. The accompanying music video became the first Stryper video that did not get popular on MTV. Two other videos followed, "Two Time Woman" and "Lady", which generated minimal airplay. Following the album's release, the band appointed Danny Goldberg of Gold Mountain Management as their new manager; their previous manager had been Janice Sweet, the Sweet brothers' mother, who had guided the band since its formation. Michael Sweet stated that the band's goal with the new direction was to direct audience's attention on music and "understand that we are a band first".

On July 20, 1991, after being signed to Hollywood Records by label exec Wesley Hein (who had originally signed them to his Enigma Records), Stryper released a greatest hits collection called Can't Stop the Rock, which featured two new songs, one of which was the Gulf War inspired "Believe". They continued to tour until February 1992, when Michael Sweet departed the band due to artistic differences and a desire to pursue a solo career. Robert Sweet subsequently attempted to continue Stryper with a new vocalist before the band ultimately disbanded. In 2026, Michael Sweet said to Logan Sekulow of CCM Magazine that he "thought it was over in ’91".

In early 1992, Stryper fulfilled some commitments in Europe as a trio with Fox on lead vocals. Soon after, on May 5, they performed two shows at Knott's Berry Farm in Buena Park, California. They asked Dale Thompson of the Christian metal band Bride to fill in on lead vocals, hoping he would join the band. and unexpectedly announcing during one of the concerts that Thompson was going to be their new lead singer. This, however, was later denied by Thompson. In early 1993, the band played several European dates as a trio with their last show on March 27, 1993, in Sportzentrum, Greifensee, Switzerland.

=== Reunions, Reborn and Murder by Pride (1999–2009) ===
The former members of Stryper first reunited in 1999, when Michael Sweet and SinDizzy were invited to play at a summer rock festival in Cabo Rojo, Puerto Rico. As an encore, Michael Sweet joined Fox and Gaines on stage and played several Stryper songs. Later, in 2000, the first "Stryper Expo" was held in New Jersey, and for the first time in 8 years, the complete line-up of Stryper took the stage. That same year, a concert at which the four members played together was held in Costa Rica. The second "Stryper Expo" took place in Los Angeles in 2001. In July 2001, Stryper played their first full-length set since 1991 at the 18th Annual Cornerstone Festival, closing a bill that included Christian rock veterans Larry Norman, The 77s, and Daniel Amos. Oz Fox explained that the band had previously avoided the Christian festival circuit by design: "We wanted to attract the non-Christians... we didn't think Cornerstone fit into that."

Hollywood Records asked the former members of Stryper to record tracks for a new greatest hits compilation in 2003, 7: The Best of Stryper. The compilation was released with two new songs, "Something" and "For You", marking Stryper's first new music since the early 1990s. As a part of the supporting tour, the band played their first reunion show on October 2, 2003, at Jaxx nightclub in Springfield, Virginia, marking their first show together in twelve years. The band played 36 shows in the United States and finished the tour in San Juan, Puerto Rico, where they performed to a sold-out crowd of more than 7,000 at the Tito Puente Amphitheatre in March 2004. A live album, titled 7 Weeks: Live in America, 2003, was released the following year, and the concert in Puerto Rico was filmed for a live DVD produced and directed by Jack Edward Sawyers. However, that show in Puerto Rico proved to be the last for the original line-up of Stryper until their 2010 reunion. Gaines and the band parted ways in 2004 before they were slated to play Disney's Night of Joy in Orlando. Michael Sweet's bassist from his solo tours, Tracy Ferrie, replaced him.

Stryper's next album, Reborn, was released on August 16, 2005, and was the band's first full-length CD of original material in 15 years. It was produced and written by Michael Sweet. The album received a positive response from fans and critics, some of whom labeled Reborn as one of the best albums of that year. Billboard noted the band's cultural significance on the occasion of their 2005 comeback album Reborn, long preceding Switchfoot, Relient K or P.O.D. According to HM Magazine, the new record kept the Stryper identity while updating its style with more modern sound taken from aspects of alternative rock and grunge, for instance featuring fewer guitar solos. In 2006, the band released the DVD Greatest Hits: Live in Puerto Rico with Music Video Distributors. Stryper was scheduled to open for the thrash metal band Slayer headlining in Mexico, but a few months after the announcement, Slayer pulled out of the Mexican tour and cancelled their headline for personal reasons.

In November 2006, Stryper announced new management and a follow-up to Reborn, tentatively due in early to mid 2007. However, that February saw lead singer Michael Sweet postponing the release of the new album two days before its recording was to begin. Michael Sweet's wife Kyle had been diagnosed with stage four ovarian cancer, and the new album was put on hold so that he could care for his family. She underwent surgery and treatment from February 14 to July 14. In April 2008, Kyle announced that her cancer had returned as of October 2007. The new album was in the mixing stage as of January 2008, and Sweet said that it should be released in July or August. Michael Sweet performed with the band Boston in 2007 and was asked to join the band as co-lead vocalist and guitarist and toured with Boston in 2008 with Styx as the opening act. On March 5, 2009, Kyle Sweet died from cancer. Murder by Pride was released on July 21, 2009, with the lead single "Peace of Mind" preceding it.

=== The Covering, No More Hell to Pay, The Fallen and split with Tim Gaines (2010–2017) ===
The Covering, a collection of 12 cover songs from bands that inspired Stryper and helped to shape the band's sound and musical identity, was released on Big3 Records/Sony and was produced by Michael Sweet. Along with the covers, it includes a new, original recording "God". On September 14, 2010, it was announced that the album's first single, a cover of Black Sabbath's "Heaven and Hell", was available for download on iTunes. The album was released on February 15, 2011.

The band signed a deal with Frontiers Records and released Second Coming on March 25, 2013. No More Hell to Pay, was completed on May 29, 2013, and released on November 5 through Frontiers Records. Live at the Whisky, a CD/DVD combination recorded at the Whisky a Go Go, was released in September 2014. Fallen was released on October 16, 2015. Reviewing a concert at the City National Grove of Anaheim, California, during the 2016 To Hell with the Devil 30th Anniversary Tour, Tammy Greene described the attendance before doors opened as "the line of fans" that stretched "halfway around the building".

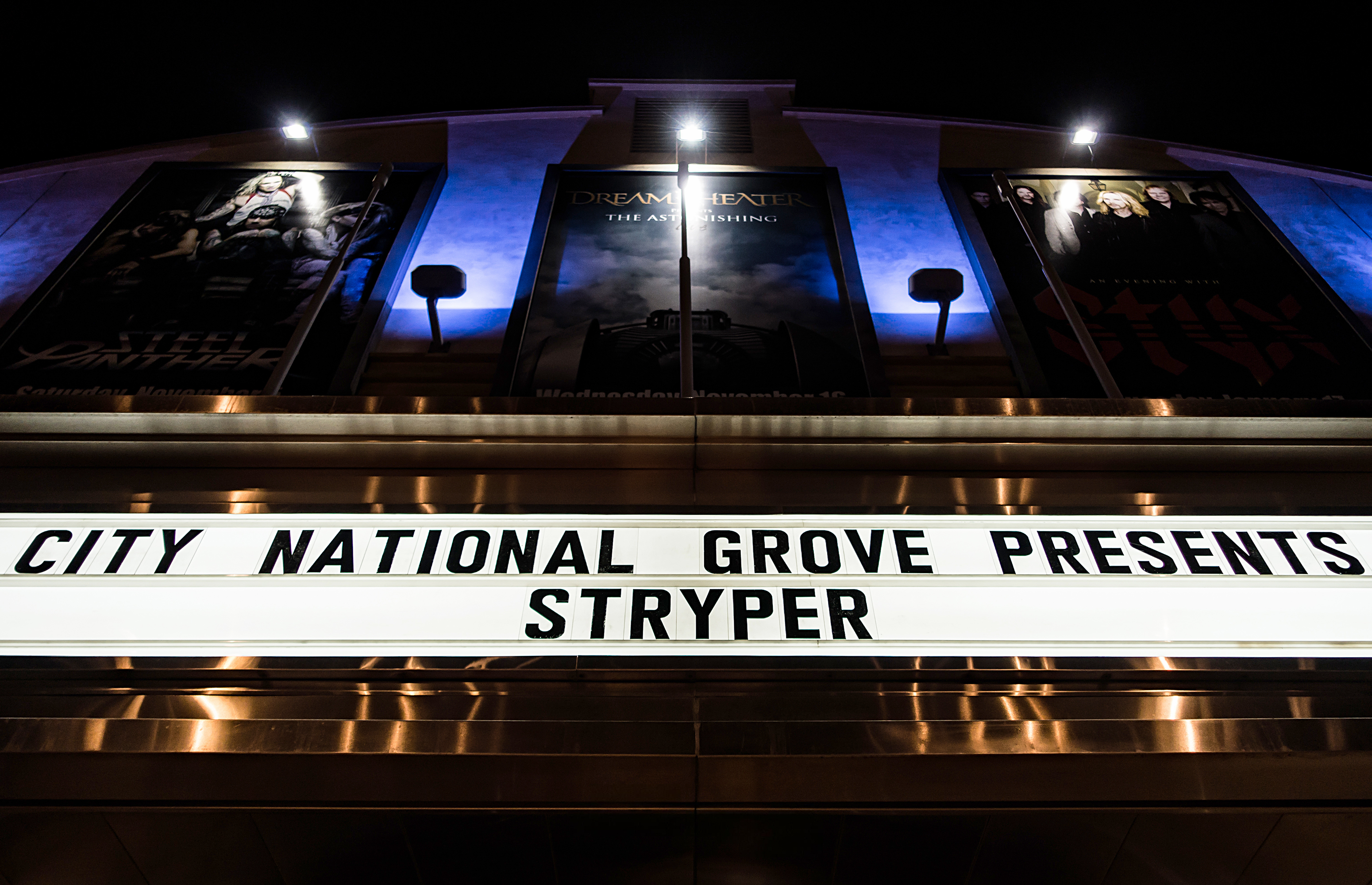
Stryper performing live at the City National Grove in Anaheim California on Sunday October 16th, 2016.

In September 2016, Michael Sweet announced the band would be going on hiatus due to personal issues affecting Gaines and that the hiatus would begin once they has completed the To Hell With the Devil 30th Anniversary Tour. Michael Sweet stated they would not continue without Gaines as the band made a pact to only stay together as they are. During the hiatus, the band members would pray about the direction of the band going forward. Michael Sweet also revealed that the next Stryper album, which was planned for a February 2017 release, would be put on hold during the hiatus. He himself would be recording a Sweet & Lynch album with his collaborator George Lynch. It was later confirmed that Gaines was no longer a member of the band, with Gaines claiming to have been kicked out of the band after being issued an ultimatum. Former FireHouse bassist Perry Richardson was announced as the new bassist on October 30, 2017.

=== God Damn Evil, Even the Devil Believes and When We Were Kings (2018–2024) ===
On February 5, 2018, Michael Sweet announced the band's next album, God Damn Evil, which was released April 20, 2018. On February 9, the band released "Take It to the Cross" as a single for the album, featuring Matt Bachand of Shadows Fall. Following the album release, Michael Sweet also discussed plans for an authorised documentary covering the band's history and impact, then in "the beginning stages", promising extensive unseen material and interviews with fans "whose lives were changed in dramatic ways". By March 2019, Sweet said the band had "a plan on paper" and had "started the ball rolling," though they still needed to "raise some money" to complete it; asked whether the Netflix success of Mötley Crüe's The Dirt might open similar doors, he said it "remains to be seen" but that he expected the documentary to "be something that is reality in the next two to three years".

On September 4, 2020, the band's next album, Even the Devil Believes, was released. It debuted atop Billboard's Top Christian Albums chart, the first chart-topper of the band's career, since entering the charts in 1984. In 2021, Stryper were inducted into The Metal Hall of Fame alongside Triumph, legacy members of Kiss and Iron Maiden, guitarist Marty Friedman, and photographer Mark Weiss. In November 2021, Stryper launched a Kickstarter campaign to fund an authorised documentary film about the band which exceeded its $100,000 funding goal, with 1,705 backers pledging $220,217. The campaign received a "Projects We Love" designation from Kickstarter.

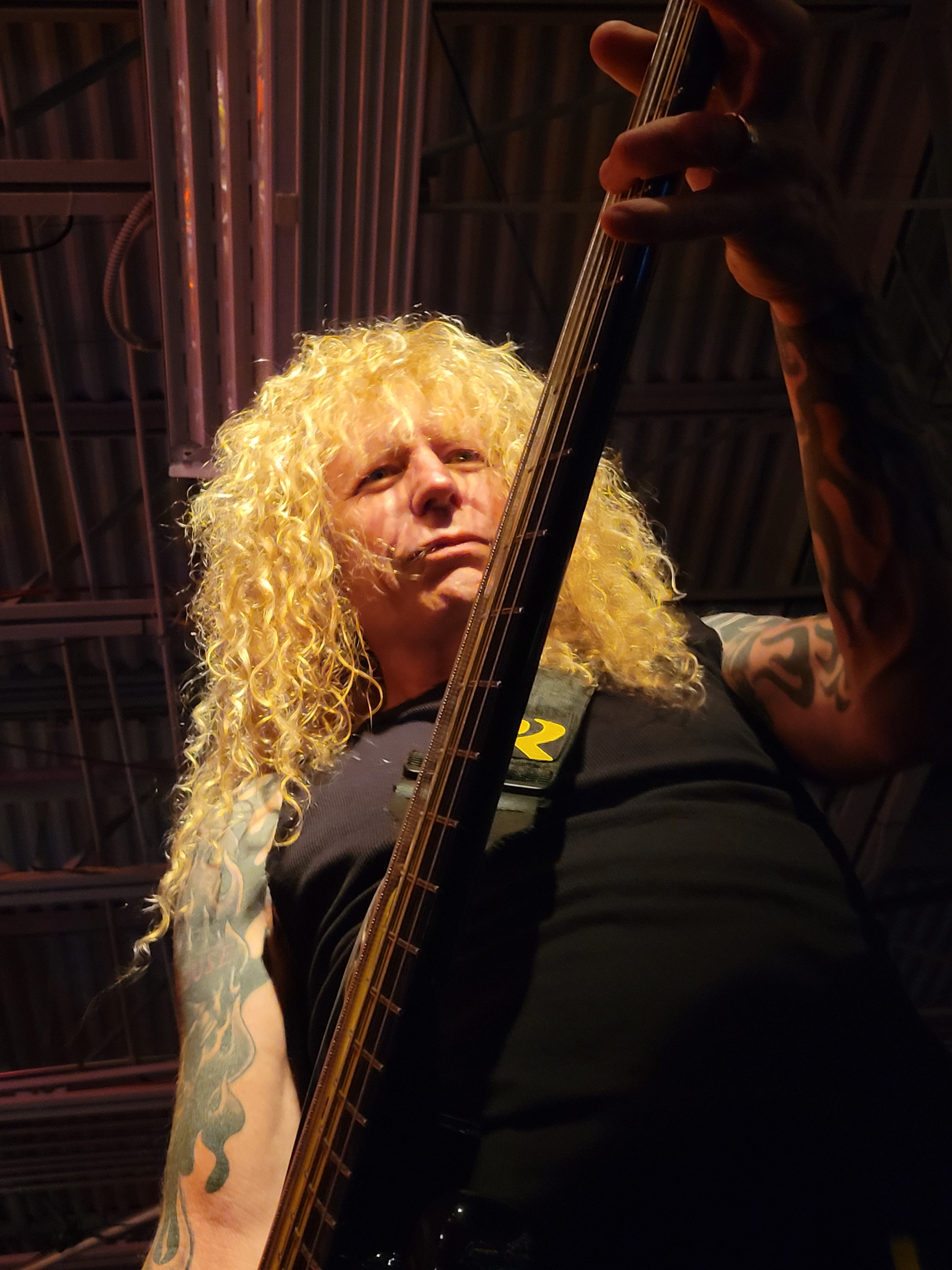
Richardson on stage with Stryper, 2022

In 2022, Stryper performed at the inaugural Monsters on the Mountain festival in Gatlinburg, Tennessee, alongside Night Ranger, Extreme, Queensrÿche, and Ratt's Stephen Pearcy, and later that year joined the Kiss Kruise, a floating festival headlined by Kiss and featuring Black Label Society, Buckcherry, and Sebastian Bach.

The album The Final Battle was announced on September 22, 2022, and released on October 21, 2022. They toured in 2023. In 2024, Stryper released To Hell with the Amps, the band's first acoustic album. Michael Sweet described the project that spent seven years in the making. The album was first released in a limited self-funded edition titled Acousticyzed on February 16, 2024, which sold out quickly; a wider re-release followed digitally on May 10, 2024, remixed and remastered in Dolby Atmos and retitled To Hell with the Amps, with physical formats following in June.

By June 2024, Stryper confirmed the documentary was in production. "We found a brilliant director, Chris Atkins, and it's being filmed now," Michael Sweet said, adding that footage would continue to be captured throughout the year.

The band's sixteenth studio album, When We Were Kings, was released September 13, 2024. In its first tracking week, the album sold approximately 6,000 copies and debuted at number 2 on the Top Christian Albums chart, narrowly missing what would have been the band's second chart-topper. It also charted at number 16 on the Top Album Sales chart and number 25 on the Top Hard Rock Albums chart.

=== The Greatest Gift of All, Throne of Thorns and future albums (2025–present) ===
Stryper released its first Christmas album, The Greatest Gift of All, on November 21, 2025. A month prior, Michael Sweet announced that Stryper had begun working on a new album for a 2026 release. Stryper released its 18th studio album of all-new material, titled Throne of Thorns, on September 25, 2026.

Early reviews for Throne of Thorns were positive. The Razor's Edge called it the "modern incarnation of Stryper", while MetalTalk described it as "a slick, polished metal record". George Dionne of KNAC rated it 4.2 out of 5.0 and wrote that the band is "sticking with their recent decade of heaviness, while also paying homage to their notable beginnings".

In September 2026, just prior to the release of Throne of Thorns, Michael Sweet confirmed that the band plans to record "three albums' worth of music" in 2027, explaining, "The reason being is to reach that 21-album goal. This one's number 18, so three more would be 21."

In October 2026, in a podcast interview with CCM Magazine, Robert and Michael Sweet reflected on the 40-year history of the band, with Robert saying how they've "done more now from ’03 to ’26 than ’84 to ’91”, adding he could never have imagined they'd still "be doing this when we’re 66 and 63."

Reviewing the October 25, 2026, closing concert of the band's Forty Years and Counting Tour at the Sherman Theatre in Stroudsburg, Pennsylvania, Robert Cavuoto of Sonic Perspectives wrote that Stryper had "structured a show that moves freely across almost every album", while "staying true to the qualities that made the band distinctive".

== Musical style ==
"To Hell with the Devil"
Sample of "To Hell with the Devil" by Stryper, from To Hell with the Devil (1986). Representing Stryper's rock/metal style, this is one of the most popular songs from the band's best-selling album.

Michael Sweet is the band's primary songwriter, writing 37 out of 48 original compositions on the band's first five releases, although all members of the band have participated in songwriting.

Writing in Billboard Magazine in 1985, Bob Darden characterised Stryper as sounding and looking like a prototypical heavy metal band, while Los Angeles Times critic Randy Lewis described their sound as "melodic, Boston-like hard rock", while Billboard characterised them in 1984 as "Van Halen for Jesus"—a phrase capturing both the sonic similarity and the band's Christian identity. Robert Sweet later resisted genre categorisation, stating: "From the very beginning, I don't think we were in the heavy metal genre. I think we were just put in there." Robert described the band's approach again a few months later: "All we're doing is presenting that word alongside the best music in the world—heavy metal." Michael Sweet has cited Van Halen, Judas Priest, Iron Maiden and Scorpions as formative influences on the band's sound.

Robert Sweet articulated the band's philosophy of musical quality as inseparable from their message, with Michael Sweet suggesting that many religious rock acts failed because their theology outweighed their musicianship: audiences, he said, don't attend a show because a band talks about Christ, but "because they're good, and because they have a good stage show." He added: "Stryper is trying to stay away from being known as a Christian band. We want to be known as a metal band for Christ." Michael Sweet elaborated in 2016: "We never wanted to be a 'Christian band.' We were Christians in a band, but we were a rock band that grew up on the streets of L.A. playing all those clubs."

Musicologist Robert Walser wrote that the band promoted Christianity by portraying it as a path to power and freedom. He argues that the band used metal's "subversive aura" to present Christianity as a youth-oriented alternative, combining the "pleasures of heavy metal" with a religious message.

Los Angeles Times critic Duncan Strauss noted guitarist Oz Fox's guitar leads as Stryper's musical strength, alongside the band's "lush vocal harmonies". HM contributed also singled out guitar harmonies and interplay between Sweet and Fox as the band's strengths. Writing in Kerrang!, Howard Johnson described the overall sound as "Dennis DeYoung fronting a good-time Priest"—invoking both the melodic accessibility of Styx and the heavy metal credibility of Judas Priest.

By 1990, Against the Law marked a shift in the band's sound. Oz Fox described the musical shift as a return to fundamentals: "More of a simple, rock 'n' roll idea—more along the lines of what we were raised on." Following their 2003 reunion, Stryper updated their sound for Reborn (2005), incorporating elements of alternative rock alongside their signature melodic metal approach. From 2013 onwards, signing with Frontiers Records brought a return to the harder sound of their commercial peak, a direction the band maintained through subsequent releases. In the 2020s, Stryper continued to record and perform actively, while incorporating contemporary production approaches. Frontman Michael Sweet characterised the band's evolving but consistent identity in 2026: "This one is for the old school metal heads. It's a little 1985 mixed with a little 1991, with a little 2026 sprinkled on top."

Michael Sweet's vocals are characterised by Ultimate Classic Rock as a "soaring tenor and ironclad vibrato", placing him among the leading voices of the hair metal era. Sweet has described his technique as high-register and chest-belted. A 2026 assessment placed Stryper among hair metal acts that had "fallen through the cracks of music history and the collective memory". Incorporating elements to the hair metal band of the era, known for presentation, "searing metallic guitar licks, power ballads, and pop sensibility", in addition to the "interplay often missing from hair metal" and vocal harmonies.

Reviewing a 2026 concert for Sonic Perspectives, Robert Cavuoto commended Michael Sweet's high-register singing and melodic phrasing, while separately highlighting the expressive bends and sustained notes of his guitar solos. He also noted Sweet and Oz Fox's harmonized guitar parts, describing Fox's playing as "muscular". Cavuoto highlighted the "precision, punch, and groove" of Robert Sweet's drumming and the close coordination between the drums and Perry Richardson's bass, which complemented the arrangements.

== Visual identity ==
A characteristic element of the band's performance were their outfits, sets, and instruments, painted in yellow and black stripes and used during shows. Michael Sweet credited his brother Robert as the primary architect of the band's visual identity: "My brother is more of the visual guy, it was more his idea. He was the guy who painted the drums and the amps." Robert explained in 1984 the band's choice of yellow and black, chosen as "caution colours" used on the highways and the two most attractive colors to people. Alternatively, the band explained the symbolism in 2003 as direct reference to the whiplash scourges given to Jesus by Pontius Pilate, drawing wording from the King James Version of the Bible's Isaiah 53:5 that relates to the motif of the suffering servant. The number of the stripes increased during shows leading up to the In God We Trust release. The band's visual identity extended beyond the stage—their manager and financial backer, Daryn Hinton, once commissioned a black limousine with yellow pinstriping to promote the band on the Sunset Strip circuit, alongside renting a billboard on Sunset Boulevard.

Apart from its ubiquitous yellow and black stripes, Stryper had other distinctive trademarks. During concerts, Stryper threw Bibles to the concert crowd—editions of the New Testament with the band's logo stickers affixed to them. As a protest against "666" symbols popular among many heavy metal fans of the era, Stryper promoted an alternative numerological symbol; Stryper's trademark use of the "777" symbol subsequently became quite popular among Christian metalheads. Although the number "777" is not actually referenced by the Bible (as opposed to 666, which is famously mentioned in The Book of Revelation as The Number of the Beast) the number "7" is traditionally (in Christian symbolism) associated with divine perfection. The Los Angeles Times reported in 1985 that "the band gets sullen fans of Twisted Sister cheering and poking stubby 'one way' fingers heavenward—a refutation of the double-fingered 'devil horns' salute of many metal groups". A trademark of the band's stage act was drummer Robert Sweet's practice of turning his enormous drum kit sideways to the audience so that the crowd could see him playing. This is why Robert was more often called a "visual timekeeper" rather than a drummer. In March 1985, Time Magazine described Stryper's initial visual impression as indistinguishable from a conventional heavy metal act before noting their practice of distributing New Testaments at shows in place of drumsticks; Robert Sweet told the magazine: "We are rock-'n'-roll evangelists. Stryper is a modern-day John the Baptist crying in the world of rock for those who don't have the life of Christ to turn on the light switch. Our message is J-E-S-U-S."

As early as 1988, a contemporaneous review of In God We Trust noted that Stryper's "recognisable black and yellow stripes had been largely abandoned" in the band's stage presentation. In 2023, Michael Sweet expressed regret about the visual identity in an interview with Louder Sound, saying: "If it had been up to me, I probably wouldn't have done the yellow and black back in the day." By 1990, the band significantly altered both sound and visual presentation with Against the Law. The yellow-and-black costumes, Bible-throwing, and explicit Christian imagery were retired. By the 30th Anniversary ‘To Hell With the Devil’ Tour in 2016, the band brought back the famous yellow-and-black stage costumes for the show.

== Critical reception ==
=== Industry recognition ===
Stryper attracted significant attention from industry figures outside the Christian music community. Sandra Gutschen, retail and promotion manager at Enigma Records, told Billboard in April 1985 that "in metal circles, Enigma is best known for the odd but effective ingredients present in Stryper." Later that year, Cliff Burnstein, co-manager of Def Leppard and Metallica, called Stryper "the biggest independent hard rock band in America".

Producer Ron Goudie, who recorded the band's debut EP, described the Sweet brothers as "some of the best musicians I've ever worked with", adding that: "They're not twins, but they're like twins, they can finish each other's thoughts. And they're fantastic players." Enigma spokesman Rick Orienza told Christianity Today in 1985 that the band's music is "very powerful" and their message was "positive in a field that has been glutted with bands with songs about the Devil and negativism".

Enigma Records co-founder Bill Hein described the band's market position: "A lot of Christian kids liked rock 'n' roll, and they were bored with a lot of the Christian music they were hearing. So Stryper comes out and they're doing rock 'n' roll. If you like Ozzy Osbourne, if you like Judas Priest, but you're a Christian? Well, here's Stryper."

=== Mainstream press ===
In April 1986, People magazine devoted a multi-page feature to Stryper, with journalist Michael Small describing them as "a marriage of very strange bedfellows—the soul of Debby Boone and the body of Ozzy Osbourne", and characterising Stryper as aspiring "to become a born-again Mötley Crüe".

Billboard described Stryper in April 1984 as "the first Christian heavy metal band", characterising them as "Van Halen for Jesus—wears spandex and leather, but goes directly from the gig to Bible study." Writing in Billboard's Talent in Action concert review section in January 1985, Ethlie Ann Vare offered a mixed assessment: "Enigma Records' Orange County find isn't a terrible band. But it is a very ordinary hard rock band, most of whose numbers sound like outtakes from the last Iron Maiden album." Vare praised Robert Sweet's drumming as "easily the most interesting aspect of the show," while noting that "his innovative style often works at odds with the plodding conventionality of his cohorts." Australian music historian Glenn A. Baker, writing in The Canberra Times in June 1986, felt that Christian hard rock was "gaining incredible momentum" with Stryper at its forefront.

Also in 1985, Kerrang! critic Howard Johnson gave Soldiers Under Command a rating of KKK½, praising Oz Fox for having "a neat line in lead rabble-rousin'" with "bursts are reasonably innovative in the Metal environment," and concluding: "if you like your Metal polished but heavy, then Stryper are gonna kick your ass." In December 1985, Kerrang! founder Geoff Barton wrote that he enjoyed "Stryper's music" and admired "them as players," predicting "they have the potential to become a very, very big band," and describing them as having taken the idea that "music is the message... one step beyond."

Writing for Nya Okej in 1986, Jörgen Holmstedt described To Hell with the Devil as "the best of three Stryper albums", noting that it contained "the same fine and melodious guitar rock as the two previous releases", and that on tracks such as "Honestly" the band sounded "almost like Styx".

Circus in January 1987 compared the band's harmonies to "the way other bands spit out power chords", concluding that their album was "more melodic than about 95% of their peers" while providing "more than enough energy to keep most jaded headbangers in neckbraces," and noting that "any doubts held by even their most skeptical critics were erased" by the commercial performance of To Hell with the Devil. Billboard noted in March 1987 that Stryper had "delivered music with a message, especially to the record industry: Christian metal sells."

Also in 1987, Swedish Nya Okej journalist Holmstedt recounted his reception of the Stryper albums: his initial reaction on hearing of a Christian heavy metal band in 1984 had been dismissive, but after being recommended Soldiers Under Command, "I liked what I heard, to such a degree that I immediately forgot what the band stood for. The music was simply good." He described falling for their "melodious and not infrequently heavy guitar rock," adding that To Hell with the Devil was "even better."

Writing in German metal publication Metal Hammer in June 1987, Götz Kühnemund described the White Metal movement Stryper had helped define as channelling heavy metal's "special, open and powerful musical style" in a "positive, spiritual direction." Hit Parader's Heavy Metal Hot Shots described Stryper as having "been able to meld strong religious messages with some of the finest metal music around."

In October 1987, Billboard framed Stryper's cultural significance: "Can a rock band with a positive message succeed in a world of Black Sabbaths? When Stryper entered the fray in 1984, the war between rock and religion opened up a new front."

A 1988 Nya Okej interview and article reviewing In God We Trust, declares the album "a worthy follow-up to To Hell with the Devil," containing "the same melodious and guitar-dominated hard rock" the band were known for, and noting that Michael Sweet "sings convincingly with his powerful and piercing voice." Holmstedt reflected that despite not caring "a bit about Christianity," he found himself able to engage with Stryper's music, noting that performing in English meant their "praising of Jesus feels less tangible" to him, suggesting that the language barrier allowed secular international audiences to engage with the music independently of the Christian message.

Rolling Stone was considerably less receptive to the band's commercial peak. Reviewing In God We Trust in 1988 and rating it two stars out of five, Kim Neely dismissed the album as "a saccharine hodgepodge of PTL sentiment," writing that "the melodies aren't half-bad, but born-again Styx just doesn't wash with your average slam fan."

Writing in Hit Parader in October 1988, Rob Andrews described Stryper as "one of the most talented bands to enter the hard rock world in many a year," noting that "no one is denying that the music on the band's latest LP is some of the most exciting to be found anywhere." When asked whether it was appropriate for a band to use their position in rock to promote religious beliefs to teenage fans, Robert Sweet reframed the question entirely, asking instead whether it was appropriate for bands to use their position to promote "the devil, death and destruction," adding: "It's far more important for an impressionable fan to hear a positive message... A band doesn't have to drink onstage in order to be cool."

Writing in the Los Angeles Times in March 1989, Janiss Garza described Stryper as a "cultural anomaly," noting that the band's elaborate staging "belied Sweet's statement that expensive trappings don't matter."

Writing in Billboard in 2005, Deborah Evans Price described the band's broader impact: "In the '80s, its blend of potent metal music and shocking antics changed the way audiences perceived Christian rock," adding that "Stryper has never believed in playing it safe." Mark Joseph, writing in HuffPost in 2010, noted that mainstream critical reception of Stryper had been "framed by condescension and sarcasm," describing the band as "a good, solid rock band" and observing that "many of the secular-fundamentalist rock critics who detested the band's mere existence are looking for work and Stryper is back on the job."

In 2016, The Aquarian described Stryper as having "dominated the hair metal scene," winning over "fans of all denominations with their undeniable ability to unify a crowd." In 2019, Rolling Stone ranked To Hell with the Devil No. 40 on its list of the 50 greatest hair metal albums of all time, noting that "one of the keys to their success was in how Stryper adopted devices associated with heavier metal—harmonic guitar lines, operatic vocals—and transformed them into delivery systems for sweet pop hooks." Jeff Mezydlo of Yardbarker, ranking Stryper at number 17 in a list of the greatest hair metal bands of all time, noted that the band "sang about Christian values and was accepted by the mainstream," would "often be the butt of plenty of rock jokes" due to their visual identity, and still "managed to generate a hit with the 1987 power ballad 'Honestly'." Writing in SPIN in 2023, Arsenio Orteza commended Stryper for "grown[ing] from a hair-metal-era curiosity to a well-oiled, crisp, decibel-crushing machine", noting that "the guitars scald, the background vocals honor Queen and Sweet (the band), and Michael still hits notes that have to be scraped off the studio ceiling."

=== Audience reception ===
Stryper drew strong audience support across both Christian and secular communities. In 1986, Swedish music journalist Jörgen Holmstedt, writing in Nya Okej, the country's most widely read youth music magazine, observed that "young people know Stryper," while "few know Trouble, 100% Proof, Leviticus, Petra or the other Jesus rockers"—distinguishing the band from all other Christian rock acts in terms of mainstream youth recognition. Hit Parader Annual reported in 1986 that Stryper's office received more than 300 fan letters daily from around the world, and said that many of the writers were not "fanatical born-agains" but were drawn to the band's "crunchy, no-nonsense music".

The following year, Holmstedt described Stryper as "the only Christian rock band to have reaped great success, even among non-believing people," and sought to understand how they had gained acceptance among a broad hard rock audience. Michael Sweet suggested part of the reason was the band's secular origins: "Most Christian rock bands grew up in the church. Stryper didn't. We became Christians a few years ago... Stryper has been on both sides, unlike other Christian bands. That's why we reach non-believers too: we relate to the real world. We don't have a Christian sound. Stryper sounds like a 'normal' hard rock band."

A Hit Parader feature in May 1988 documented divided fan motivations at Stryper concerts, contrasting a young man who credited the band's message with turning his life around after drug use and homelessness with fans drawn primarily to the music itself. Journalist Rob Andrews concluded that "there unquestionably is a strong religious element who look to the band as a safe, palatable means of being fed a Christian message," while noting a substantial segment of the audience saw themselves as there for the music alone.

Robert Sweet confirmed in 1989 that approximately 80 percent of concert attendees were non-Christians. During the band's 1989 Australian tour, an autograph session at a Melbourne record store drew approximately 1,500 fans, with the crowd breaking a shop window and requiring police intervention.

Stryper also encountered hostility from some secular metal audiences: during a support slot opening for Raven and Anthrax, the band were physically assaulted by fans hostile to their Christian message—an incident documented by Billboard and later Metal Hammer. A 1985 CCM Magazine article by Chris Willman, who was also writing for the Los Angeles Times, stated that "Stryper was the target of scattered picketing, boycott threats, and righteous denunciations". For example, concert-goers were often greeted by protesters armed with bullhorns and distribution of Gospel tracts.

=== Religious reception ===
Stryper's combination of heavy metal and Christian faith generated both support and opposition within religious communities. Prior to the release of The Yellow and Black Attack, Enigma Records received calls from churches looking to purchase copies in bulk for congregational distribution. Enigma president Wesley Hein recalled: "When it's out, I want to buy a box... We're going to give them out at our church." Pastor Raul Ries of Calvary Chapel in West Covina, California, supported the band's early performances, helping organise a tour of high schools, colleges and churches. Ries, whose congregation numbered 6,500, told Christianity Today in 1985 that the band's evangelistic impact was tangible: "These guys are pulling people out of hell. They've been coming here for a year and a half, and we've seen a lot of their fruits."

Bob Larson, a critic of rock music, said in 1985 that while he supported the band's "sincerity", he "very strongly object[ed] to the whole heavy-metal frame of reference" and worried that young fans would emulate the band's imagery. By contrast, Steve Peters, co-author of Why Knock Rock? and a vocal critic of rock music generally, defended the band's methods: "I would dress as a clown... to get on Entertainment Tonight and share 10 sentences about Jesus Christ."

Robert Sweet stated in 1986 that the band's concerts were "more protested than Mötley Crüe's," reflecting sustained opposition from religious fundamentalists who viewed heavy metal as incompatible with Christian faith. Petra founder and guitarist Bob Hartman independently confirmed in 1987 that Stryper concerts were regularly picketed, observing that "Petra concerts aren't picketed like many Stryper concerts these days."

In Australia, Fred Nile, founder of the Christian Democratic Party, publicly opposed Stryper's 1987 Australian tour, stating that churches which had received promotional copies of their records "should send them straight back." In a subsequent televised interview, band members methodically rebutted each of Nile's objections—Sweet challenged Nile to exchange wardrobes for a photograph, an offer Nile declined—after which Nile agreed to attend a Stryper concert in Sydney. Jimmy Swaggart, whose ministry had influenced the Sweet brothers' rededication to Christianity, later denounced the band in his 1987 book Religious Rock 'n' Roll: A Wolf in Sheep's Clothing, describing their music as "a travesty and a mockery of what the Lord stands for."

Responding to Swaggart's criticism in 1988, Robert Sweet told Hit Parader that the televangelist had been "partly responsible for us discovering Christ" but had later "seemed to take a great deal of pleasure in picking on us and not recognizing that we were probably reaching more kids in need of the Lord than he was."

== Legacy ==
The Rolling Stone Encyclopedia of Rock & Roll noted that although Stryper's "motives have been attacked by both rock critics and evangelist Jimmy Swaggart," the band was "one of the most successful Christian rock bands, spreading the Word with a slick heavy-metal sound."

Stryper was the first openly Christian heavy metal band to gain recognition in the mainstream music world. Mark Joseph states, "The Yellow and Black Attack was propelled by the group's success in Japan, which was largely due to an endorsement of the band by famed rock critic Masa Itoh, the man who ruled the Japanese hard rock/metal scene, who many fans looked to for his evaluation of bands. Itoh had heard of Stryper, gotten in touch with their manager Daryn Hinton, and liked what he heard. When he gave the band a positive review in Japan's heavy metal bible Burrn! magazine and played the album on his radio show, Stryper suddenly found themselves at the top of the metal heap in Japan with a record that was outselling Mötley Crüe, Bon Jovi, and every other metal band."

Many Christian critics did not approve of the group's association with the heavy metal subculture, which has often been associated with Satanic imagery. Other Christian detractors viewed the band's flashy costumes as incongruous with the modesty in dress often associated with sincere practitioners of devout Christianity.

Australian mainstream awareness of Stryper developed from 1986—music historian Glenn A. Baker noted in The Canberra Times that the band was playing "10,000-seat venues across America" while fans lined up for hours to have their Bibles autographed.

In a February 1987 Hit Parader did a cover story titled "Stryper vs. W.A.S.P.: Heaven and Hell" contrasting the two bands. In the feature article, Blackie Lawless of W.A.S.P. described his own band's shock tactics as "entertainment, pure and simple," while Michael Sweet proposed a joint tour, noting Stryper's experience opening for hostile crowds: "We think the same thing would happen with W.A.S.P. ... Maybe we'd even be able to get through to the people in W.A.S.P.—that would be a real challenge."

In June 1987, at the height of their commercial success, Stryper were featured as the defining act of the White Metal movement in a four-page feature in German metal publication Metal Hammer, with journalist Götz Kühnemund identifying them as the band that had given the movement its identity.

During Stryper's 1989 Australian tour, The Canberra Times cited drummer Robert Sweet rejecting the "Christian band" label: "Don't just look at Stryper as a Christian band. Look at Stryper as a Bon Jovi, a Guns N' Roses... call us a rock 'n' roll band." At the Dove Awards in April 1989, In God We Trust won in both the top metal album and top metal recorded song categories.

In 1990, Rolling Stone magazine reported that the band had become disillusioned with Christian music. This, combined with a notable shift in tone in the band's lyrics, led to Against the Law being banned from many Christian bookstores. The Benson Company, Stryper's sole tie to the Christian market, dropped this album from distribution. Robert Sweet later rejected the notion that the band had withdrawn from the broader rock industry during this period: "I think a lot of people got the wrong message. They kind of looked at us as wanting to stay away from people in the rock and metal industry, like Halford, but that's not what we wanted to do at all."

Stryper has sold over 10 million recordings worldwide, and it is estimated that two-thirds of their albums were bought by non-Christians. In 2011, Stryper won the readers choice award for Best Christian / Gospel Artists & Bands. Kim Jones of About.com states, "With 44% of the vote, hard rock legends Stryper beat out all of their competition to be named the best Christian hard rock band, bringing to mind the old adage, 'like a fine wine, some things just get better with age.'"

Ian Christe, author of the heavy metal history book Sound of the Beast: The Complete Headbanging History of Heavy Metal, mentions the album To Hell with the Devil in his book as one of the landmarks of the glam metal movement.

Stryper's cultural significance was examined by historian Eileen Luhr in American Quarterly (2004), which analysed Christian metal as part of American evangelicalism's broader cultural mobilisation in the 1980s and early 1990s. Luhr described Stryper as "the most successful Christian metal act" of the era, noting that the band's recordings achieved gold and platinum status and their videos received MTV airplay.

Derek Stipe of rock band Monday Morning told Billboard in 2005 that Stryper's "role in Christian music history is secure," stating: "They took their music where no Christian bands would go at the time and where few still go today."

The song "To Hell with the Devil" appears on the Rhino Records release The Heavy Metal Box, a compilation mainly of secular classic metal bands like Iron Maiden, Judas Priest, and Metallica, as well as hair bands like Twisted Sister and Poison.

In his autobiography A Lion's Tale: Around the World in Spandex, professional wrestler Chris Jericho mentions that, as he got into heavy metal music as a teenager, Stryper was one of his favorite bands, and during the very beginning of his wrestling career on the Canadian independent circuit, his ring attire was black and yellow, which he purposely did as a tribute to the band. Howard Jones, vocalist of Killswitch Engage, cited Stryper as a formative influence, recalling that "it was like '85 when we started listening to Stryper" while absorbing heavy metal through MTV as a teenager.

Before achieving mainstream country stardom, multiple ACM and CMA, Lainey Wilson performed with Kasey Tyndall as members of the group Loretta Jett on a bill with Stryper at the Mercury Ballroom in Louisville, Kentucky on November 6, 2016.

David Smallbone, father of Rebecca St. James and For King & Country members Joel and Luke Smallbone, promoted Christian music artists in Australia during the 1980s, including Stryper. The Smallbone brothers later cited Stryper as a childhood influence, recalling "sitting in front of a record player holding a vinyl 45 of Stryper's The Yellow and Black Attack cover." The 2024 biographical film Unsung Hero, depicting the Smallbone family's story, features Stryper as characters portrayed by actors. For the film's soundtrack, Joel and Luke Smallbone recorded a cover of "To Hell with the Devil"—retitled "To Hell With the Devil (RISE)"—featuring Lecrae and Stryper.

Chris White, writer-director of the 2020 film Electric Jesus, a coming-of-age story about a fictional Christian hair-metal band, cited Stryper as a formative influence in American Songwriter: "We revered bands like Stryper who talked non-ironically about Jesus, but played cool music and looked like legit rock stars." White added: "Really—someone needs to make a documentary about Stryper!"

In 2025, Stryper's “To Hell With the Devil” formed one of the three principal components of Bill McClintock's mashup “Hotter Than a Highway to Hell With the Devil”, alongside AC/DC's “Highway to Hell” and Kiss's “Hotter Than Hell”, with additional material from Mötley Crüe, Pantera, Judas Priest, Van Halen, Vixen and Def Leppard among other major hard rock and metal acts.

== Awards and accolades ==
=== RIAA certifications ===
Title	Format	Certification	Date	Ref.
To Hell with the Devil	Album	Gold	February 19, 1987	
To Hell with the Devil	Album	Platinum	January 6, 1988	
Soldiers Under Command	Album	Gold	April 6, 1988	
In God We Trust	Album	Gold	September 15, 1988	
Live in Japan	Video longform	Platinum	October 5, 1989	
In the Beginning	Video longform	Gold	October 5, 1989	

=== Grammy Awards ===
- 1988: 30th Annual Grammy Awards nomination—Best Gospel Performance by a Duo or Group, Choir or Chorus (To Hell with the Devil)

=== Dove Awards ===
- 1986: Performed at the 17th Annual Dove Awards, described by Billboard as "the musical hit of the evening"
- 1989: Top Metal Album and Top Metal Recorded Song (In God We Trust and "In God We Trust")

=== NARM Best Seller Awards ===
- 1988: Best-selling gospel/spiritual album (To Hell with the Devil) at the 30th Annual NARM Best Seller Awards

=== Metal Hall of Fame ===
- 2021: Stryper inducted into the The Metal Hall of Fame

== Members ==
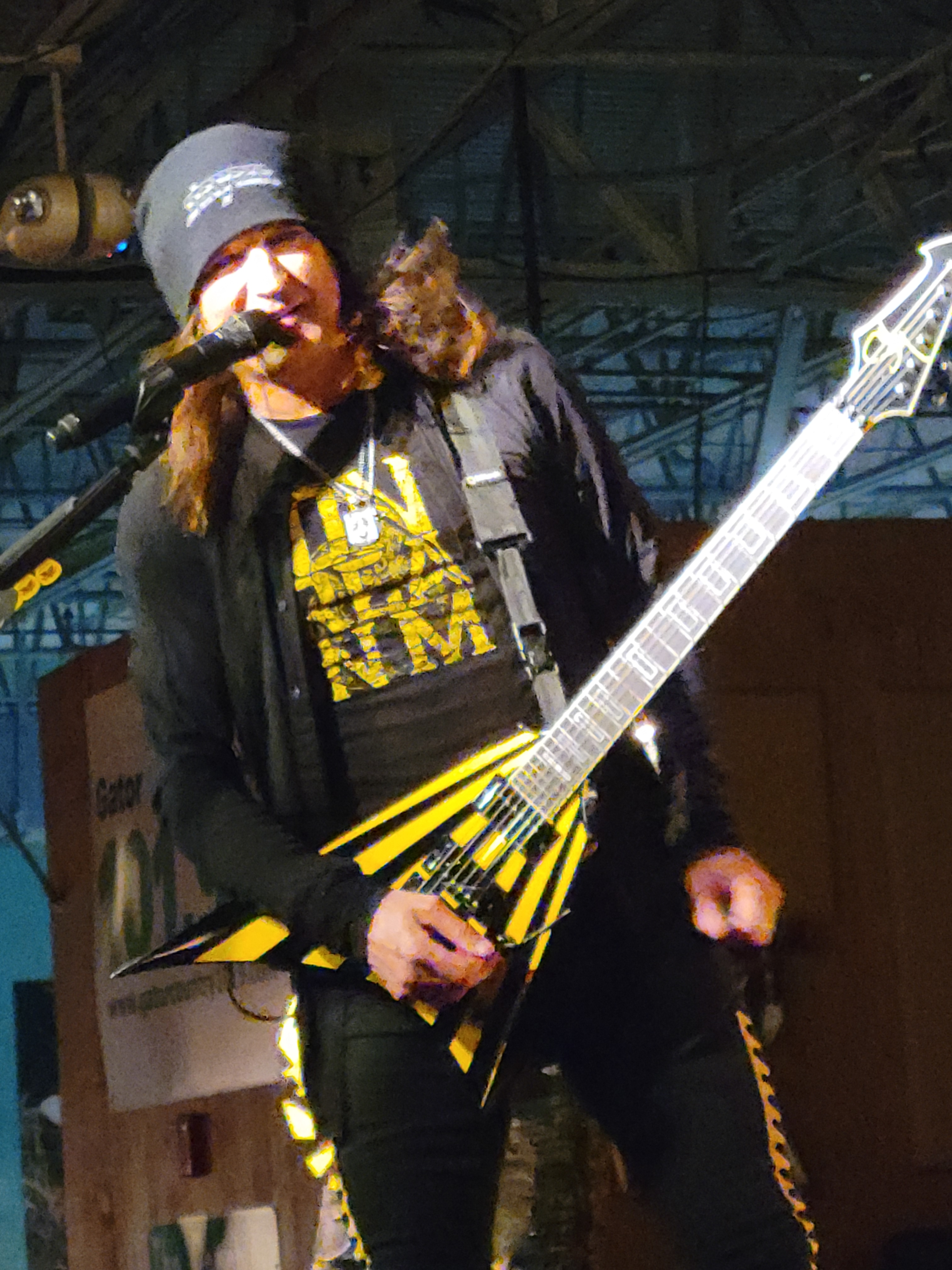
Stryper frontman Michael Sweet, 2022

Current

- Michael Sweet – lead vocals, lead & rhythm guitar, keyboards, piano (1981–1992, 1999–2001, 2003–present)
- Robert Sweet – drums, percussion (1981–1993, 2000–2001, 2003–present)
- Oz Fox – lead & rhythm guitar (1983–1993, 1999–2001, 2003–present), backing vocals (1983–1992, 1999–2001, 2003–present), lead vocals (1992–1993)
- Perry Richardson – bass, backing vocals (2017–present)

Former

- Eric Johnson – bass, backing vocals (1981-1982)
- Scott Lane – lead guitar, backing vocals (1982-1983)
- John Voorhees – bass, backing vocals (1982-1983)
- Tim Gaines – bass, backing vocals, keyboards, piano (1983–1986, 1986–1993, 1999–2001, 2003–2004, 2010–2017)
- Matt Hurich – bass, backing vocals (1986)
- Tracy Ferrie – bass, backing vocals (2004–2010)

Session

- John Van Tongeren – keyboards (The Roxx Regime Demos, Soldiers Under Command, To Hell with the Devil, In God We Trust), bass (Soldiers Under Command)
- Christopher Currell – synclavier, guitar (Soldiers Under Command)
- Billy Meyers – keyboards (In God We Trust)
- Steve Croes – synclavier (In God We Trust)
- Brad Cobb – bass (To Hell with the Devil, In God We Trust)
- John Purcell – keyboards (Against the Law)
- Jeff Scott Soto – background vocals (Against the Law)
- Randy Jackson – bass (Against the Law)
- Brent Jeffers – drums, keyboards (Against the Law), (1986–1990 touring)
- Tom Werman – percussion (Against the Law)
- Kenny Aronoff – drums (Murder by Pride)

Touring

- Charles Foley – keyboards (touring)
- Kenny Metcalf – keyboards (1985, 1986 touring)
- Will Doughty – keyboards (2024)
- Howie Simon – lead guitar, backing vocals (2025)

== Discography ==
- The Yellow and Black Attack (1984) (EP)
- Soldiers Under Command (1985)
- To Hell with the Devil (1986)
- In God We Trust (1988)
- Against the Law (1990)
- Reborn (2005)
- Murder by Pride (2009)
- The Covering (2011) (cover album)
- Second Coming (2013) (re-recordings)
- No More Hell to Pay (2013)
- Fallen (2015)
- God Damn Evil (2018)
- Even the Devil Believes (2020)
- The Final Battle (2022)
- To Hell with the Amps (2024) (acoustic album)
- When We Were Kings (2024)
- The Greatest Gift of All (2025) (christmas album)
- Throne of Thorns (2026)
