= Robert Sweet (musician) =

American drummer

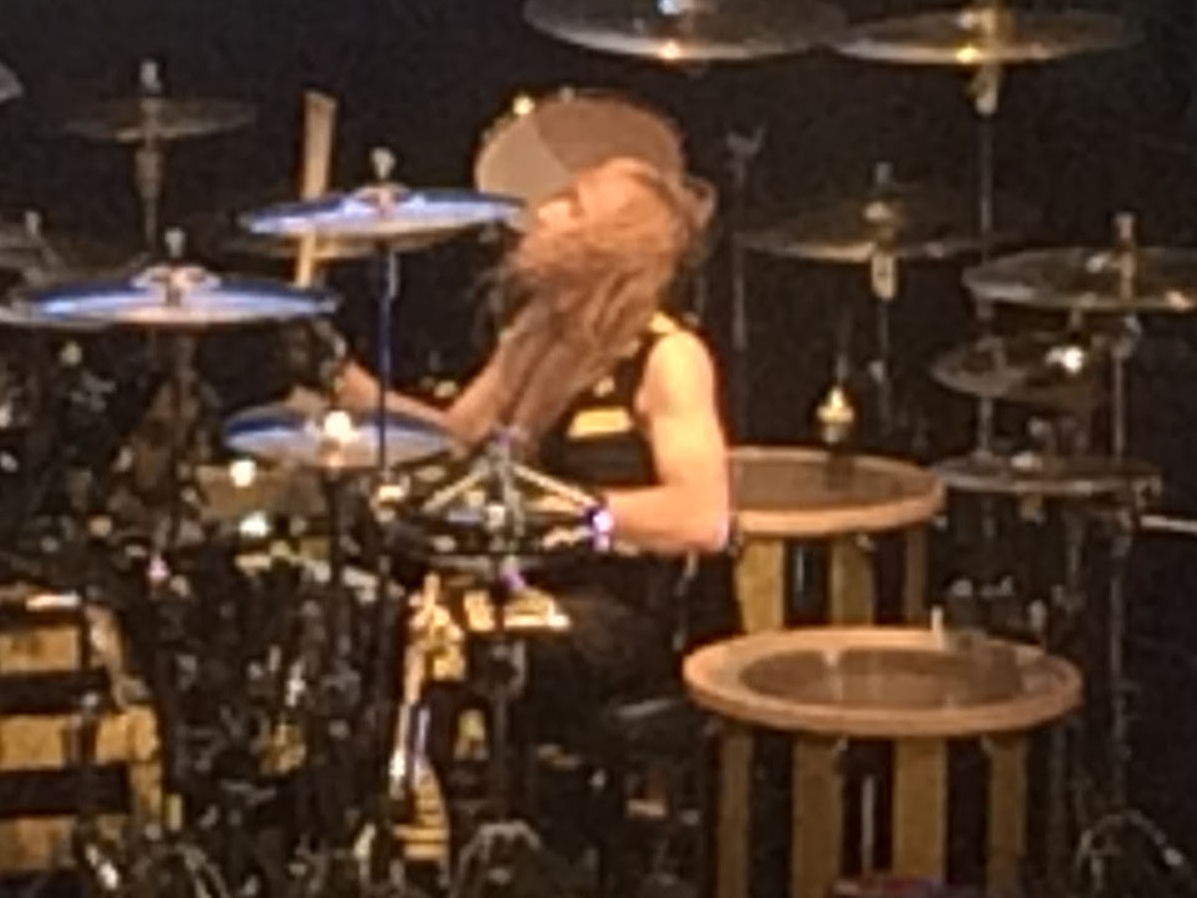
- Sweet performing in September 2016

Background information
- Born: Robert Lee Sweet; March 21, 1960 (age 66); Lynwood, California
- Origin: U.S.
- Genres: Christian metal; glam metal; heavy metal; hard rock; nu metal
- Occupations: Drummer, producer
- Instruments: Drums, percussion, vocals
- Years active: 1975–present
- Website: www.stryper.com

Robert Lee Sweet (born March 21, 1960) is an American musician, drummer, and co-founder of the heavy metal band Stryper. Sweet initiated the band that would become Stryper while still a teenager, later recruiting his younger brother Michael Sweet — who was around 13 at the time — and establishing the group's musical and visual identity from the outset. He is widely known as Stryper's "Visual Time Keeper", a title he coined himself. Writing in Billboard, critic Ethlie Ann Vare described Sweet as "easily the most interesting aspect of the show" at a December 1984 Stryper concert at the Santa Monica Civic Auditorium.

Robert's drumming and stage presence would go on to define much of Stryper's visual identity (see Visual identity and performance below).

Sweet's interest in drumming began in early childhood. He cites a stop at a club during a trip to Las Vegas when he was 10 years old as a defining moment. A blue sparkle Ludwig drum set caught his attention and he "fell in love". Sweet attended Pioneer High School in Whittier, California. During high school, instead of participating in a traditional school music program like marching band, he worked with the school's music director to put together a rock band. He is a self-taught drummer, honing his craft playing along with other drummers while developing his style at the same time. After high school he went to college to study music but left after a month. At the age of 15, in April 1975, Sweet became a Christian, an outgrowth of a lifelong belief in God.

== Formation of Roxx Regime ==
Robert met guitarist Oz Fox at Katherine Edwards Junior High School in Whittier, California, and rekindled that friendship at Pioneer High School. He recruited Fox to the band he was forming with his younger brother Michael. The three developed material together while Sweet and Fox held the same job, building a full set of original songs before their first live performances. The brothers had earlier performed under the names Firestorm and Aftermath before briefly joining forces with a local guitarist whose band was called Roxx; Sweet appended "Regime" to the name after discovering another act had already used it. Roxx Regime performed on the Sunset Strip circuit from around 1981, playing venues including the Whisky a Go Go, the Troubadour, and Gazzarri's. Sweet later stated that the band's yellow-and-black stripe concept also dates from this period: "We've been using stripes since 1980 when we were Roxx Regime... In all honesty we were using the stripes before Quiet Riot picked up on it." Bassist Tim Gaines joined the band in 1983 after becoming a Christian and resigning from Stormer.

Robert Sweet described the band's pre-conversion identity to Billboard in 1985: "We had the complete Southern California look, right down to the chains and flames and lipstick. There certainly wasn't any Christian slant to our music." Sweet explained that the Enigma Records relationship predated the name change: "We'd been taking a demo by Enigma Records for months... After we decided to become Stryper, we went back and re-wrote all of the lyrics. Boy! Was Enigma surprised. But by then they were sold on our sound and our look."

== Becoming Stryper ==
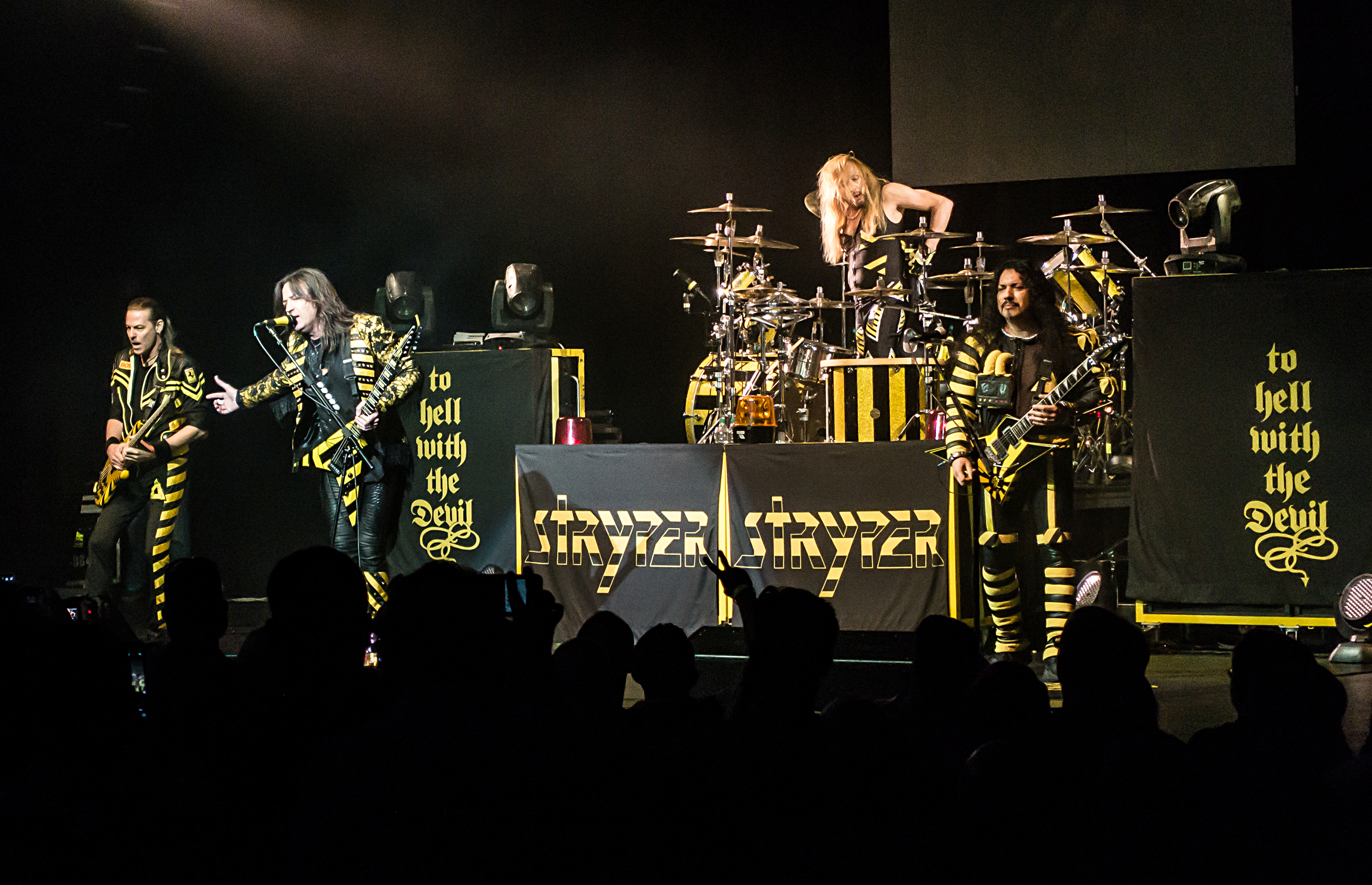
Stryper performing live at the City National Grove in Anaheim California on Sunday October 16th, 2016.

Although the Sweet brothers had accepted Christianity in their youth, their immersion in the Sunset Strip club scene had led them away from practising their faith; around 1983, following conversations with friends in the music community who had recently rededicated their lives to Christianity, the band rewrote their lyrics to reflect their renewed faith and disclosed their beliefs to Enigma.

According to Michael Sweet, the name was conceived while the band was rehearsing in their garage with striped walls and striped equipment, and was deliberately spelled with a y to avoid resemblance to the word "stripper".

They later added the Bible reference, and Robert created a backronym for the new name: "Salvation Through Redemption, Yielding Peace, Encouragement, and Righteousness." He also introduced the numerological element of 777 as a counterpoint to the 666 imagery prevalent in heavy metal at the time, explaining: "I'm sure you're familiar with 666 — the number of the Anti-Christ. Well, 777 is the number of God and the number of perfection. We have that on everything too."

Sweet estimated in 1985 that most of Stryper's audiences were predominantly non-Christians, stating: "We're a good rock band. We just happen to focus our songs on Jesus." He restated this position to Billboard in 1987: "People think a Christian band is going to sound corny, but I think we've proven we're a good rock band. We just happen to focus our songs on Jesus."

Sweet distinguished Stryper from other Christian rock acts of the period, framing the band's dual appeal in characteristically direct terms: "Most [Christian rock bands] don't look it, and if they look it they don't sound it. And that's what I think is so different about Stryper: we're two extremes combined... If you love God and hate rock 'n' roll, you'll love Stryper. If you hate God and love rock 'n' roll, you'll love Stryper. And if you love God and rock 'n' roll — ha! — you'll buy all our records, go to all our concerts and have the time of your lives!"

Profiling the band for a general readership in 1985, Time described Stryper's initial visual impression as indistinguishable from a conventional heavy metal act before noting their practice of distributing New Testaments at shows in place of drumsticks; Sweet told the magazine: "We are rock-'n'-roll evangelists. Stryper is a modern-day John the Baptist crying in the world of rock for those who don't have the life of Christ to turn on the light switch. Our message is J-E-S-U-S."

Reviewing Stryper's February 1987 performance at the Warner Theatre (Washington D.C.), Todd Allan Yasui of The Washington Post called the show "a relentless attack of heavy metal thunder" and highlighted Robert Sweet's "turbo-charged" drumming.

== Visual identity and performance ==
Unlike most drummers, Sweet plays facing stage left or right rather than straight ahead, positioning his kit so the audience can see him rather than having their view obscured. He began using this sideways setup in 1978: "I wanted to be different and I had the mindset not to look like anyone else. At the time I noticed that guys were being completely covered by their drum sets. You couldn't even see them back there." Sweet cited John Bonham, Leonard Haze of Y&T, and Alex Van Halen as influences, while noting that he was shaped more by frontmen and guitarists than by other drummers: "Growing up I thought a lot of drummers didn't look good and they were lacking in showmanship." He mounted chains and mirrors to his kit, allowing him to see the audience and be seen in turn — a change that affected his playing as well as his stage presence, leading him to begin jumping on his drums and kicking cymbals during performances.

Robert coined the term "Visual Time Keeper" for this approach himself, explaining: "I call myself a 'visual timekeeper' cos I don't want to fall into the usual kind of mould of a drummer." Billboard critic Ethlie Ann Vare, reviewing a December 1984 show at the Santa Monica Civic Auditorium, described Sweet as "easily the most interesting aspect of the show." Sweet maintained that the band earned peer credibility through performance rather than reputation, recalling shows shared with sceptical acts: "Isn't it funny when we share the bill with these guys, and we blow them offstage. Then they have to take us seriously!"

Sweet explained the band's choice of yellow and black: "Yellow and black are caution colours used on the highway. They're also two colours that attract people the most." The band constructed and painted their own equipment — "my drums, the guitars, amps... everything" — to maintain the identity consistently throughout their stage production.

The 'Visual Timekeeper' summarised his view of performance as inseparable from the band's message: "If people don't like the music or are not entertained by your show, they are not really going to listen to much to what you have to say." Reflecting on the band's identity in later years, Sweet distinguished Stryper's musical authenticity from its faith commitment: "With Stryper, we were always one hundred percent rock 'n' roll. We're not these Christians who are trying to be rock 'n' roll guys. We love rock 'n' roll music. But when it comes to Christianity, we mean what we say."

Decades later, Michael Sweet independently confirmed this division of roles within the band: "I was kind of always the music guy, Rob was always the visual guy, and that's just how it's always been."

== Post Stryper ==
After Stryper broke up in 1992, Sweet played in a variety of acts and projects largely Christian-oriented. He participated in the band King James with former Stryper bassist Tim Gaines and former Whitecross guitarist Rex Carroll, and toured with them until 1996. He also participated in other projects, such as Shameless and Titanic. Sweet recorded a solo album titled Love Trash which demonstrated an eclectic side of his writing and performing capabilities. Later, Sweet performed for a number of metal bands' albums including Blissed, Final Axe, Menchen (with guitarist Bill Menchen), Seventh Power, Subdux, and Dbeality as well as guest appearing on a few tracks for Titanic and the supergroups Shameles, 7 Hours Later and Cleanbreak.

Following Michael Sweet's departure from the band in February 1992, Robert Sweet attempted to continue Stryper with a new vocalist before the band ultimately disbanded.

== Stryper reunion ==
Sweet played a key role in the reappearance of Stryper by taking part in 2000s "Stryper Expo" and a reunion show in Costa Rica. The successful reception led Sweet to push for a reunion of the band which came in the form of a request by Hollywood Records for a new Best of collection. The band decided that rather than doing another compilation, they would record two new songs and go on tour in support of the new release. 2003 saw Sweet tour with a re-formed Stryper that featured the departure of bassist, Tim Gaines, who was replaced by Tracy Ferrie. In 2004, Stryper returned to the studio to begin working on its August 2005 release, Reborn, which marked the band's first full-length recording of original material in over 15 years, since 1990's Against the Law. The Stryper Murder by Pride album, released July 2009, marked the first Stryper album Sweet did not record drums for, this position was filled by studio musician Kenny Aronoff. He did however play in Stryper's 25th Anniversary Tour in support of the album. Sweet has appeared on every Stryper album since.

== Influence ==
- Mike Portnoy of Dream Theater, Avenged Sevenfold, and a host of other bands, who was also named "Best Drummer" by Modern Drummer magazine, stated in an interview that Sweet was one of his favorite drummers.
- Joey Cassata of the band ZO2 and the TV show Z Rock names Sweet as one of his influences describing him as "one of the all-time great rock drummers."
- Troy Adcox of the Dallas-based Christian rock, praise and worship band Lucid Dreamer lists him as one of his six influential drummers.
- Robert Hernandez, Jr., of the band Blacklight from San Antonio, Texas, named Sweet as a favorite drummer.
- In an undated interview, Marc Anthony, drummer for the Raleigh, North Carolina–based band Widow, identified Sweet as his second most influential drummer.
- Gustavo Muñoz of Disdente expanded his drumming technique by playing along with Sweet, one of his favorite drummers.

== Equipment ==
As of September 2019, Sweet endorses Yamaha drums (previously Crush drums), Stagg Cymbals, SKB Cases, Regal Tip by Calato Metal X wood tip drumsticks, Kickport, May acoustic drum miking system, Solomon Design mics, Aquarian Drumheads, Affliction clothing, Ahead drum gloves, and Trick drums.

== Discography ==
=== Solo ===
- 2000: Love Trash

=== Final Axe ===
- 2006: The Axe Of The Apostles
- 2010: Beyond Hell's Gate Collector's Edition

=== Menchen ===
- 2008: Red Rock
- 2011: In The Light

=== The Seventh Power ===
- 2006: Seventh Power
- 2008: Dominion & Power

=== Guest appearances ===
- 1989: First Watch, Guardian (backing vocals on "Hyperdrive")
- 1996: X'd Out, Out There, Ken Zehner (producer and drums)
- 1999: Backstreet Anthems, Shameless (drums on "Just 1 Night" and "What's Goin' On")
- 2003: It's About Time, 7 Hours Later (drums on "Perfect")
- 2010: Maiden Voyage (Collectors Edition), Titanic (drums on "Don't Care", "Freak Show", and "Suicide Doctor"; the original recording featured a drum machine)

=== Other works ===
- 1994: King James, King James
- 2002: Waking Up the Dead, Blissed
- 2002: Subdux One, Subdux
- 2003: It's About Time, 7 Hours Later
- 2005: Dbeality, Dbeality
