= Oz Fox =

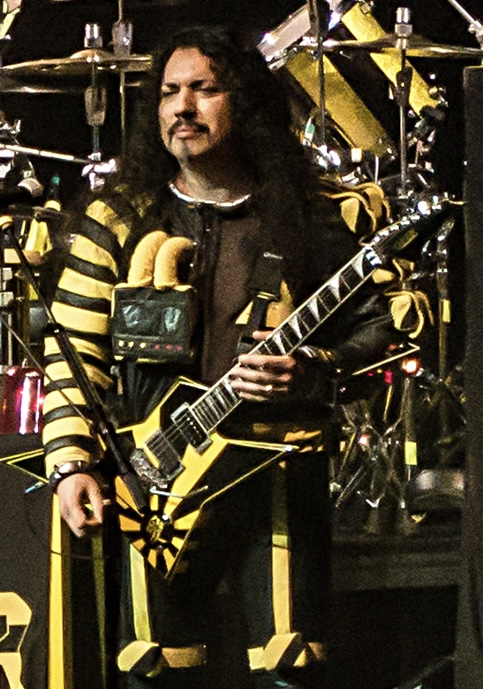
- Fox in 2016

Background information
- Also known as: Oz Fox
- Born: Richard Alfonso Martínez; June 18, 1961 (age 65)
- Origin: Whittier, California
- Genres: Christian metal, heavy metal, hard rock, glam metal
- Occupations: Singer, guitarist, songwriter, producer
- Instruments: Guitar, vocals
- Years active: 1983–present
- Labels: Big3 Records, Fifty Three Five Records
- Website: ozfox.us

Richard Alfonso Martinez (born June 18, 1961), better known by the stage name Oz Fox, is the lead guitarist of the Christian glam metal band Stryper. Martinez' high school friends called him Oz in honor of Ozzy Osbourne due to his ability to emulate the vocals of Osbourne while playing Black Sabbath covers in his pre-Stryper days. He was recruited by the Sweet brothers in 1983 to form what would become Stryper. Tim Gaines joined the band in 1983 after leaving Los Angeles-based hard rock band Stormer. As a founding member of the band, Fox recorded and toured with Stryper until the band's first break up in 1992 but has since rejoined the band.

== Background ==
Fox was born on June 18, 1961, in Whittier, California, to Richard Joseph Martinez and Jessie Maria Martinez. Oz joined Stryper after Robert Sweet, who had met Fox at Katherine Edwards Junior High School, rekindled their friendship at Pioneer High School. Michael Sweet, who was 13 when he joined his brother's band, described the songwriting process: the three developed material together while Robert and Oz worked the same job, building enough songs for a full set before their first live performances as Roxx Regime.

Having been influenced by artists from many styles of music, including country, Fox's style can best be described as having been heavily influenced by the style pioneered by Eddie Van Halen; Fox would often warm up by playing Van Halen's "I'm The One" note for note before Stryper shows. He joined the LA guitarists trend of heavily incorporating tapping, sweeping, string skipping and wild tremolo use along with peers such as George Lynch, Warren DeMartini, Jake E. Lee, Mick Mars, and Tony Palacios. Fox recorded half of the guitar solos with Stryper while additionally providing background vocals for the group. He later took up the main vocal duties for a period of four months in 1992 after founding member Michael Sweet decided to leave the band and pursue a solo career. With Fox on lead vocals, the trio did two short tours in Europe.

After Stryper, Fox played in several projects, including his own band, SinDizzy, where he played rhythm guitar and sang lead vocals. SinDizzy, which released an album in 1998 titled He's Not Dead, included former Stryper bassist Tim Gaines, drummer John Bocanegra and LA guitarist Bobby MacNeil. SinDizzy was a departure for Fox as it allowed him to explore his writing and playing from a much different perspective than in his prior work. SinDizzy would be put on hiatus however due to Fox and Gaines being asked to rejoin Stryper for their reunion in 2003 in support of the album 7 after the widespread acceptance and excitement generated by the first 'Stryper Expo'. Though Gaines would elect to leave the band, Fox, together with brothers Robert and Michael Sweet and newcomer bassist Tracy Ferrie and later Perry Richardson, is still recording and touring with the group. Fox's latest work is on Stryper's God Damn Evil album released in April 2018 and Even the Devil Believes from 2020.

== Other activities ==
Fox has hosted "Rewind" on JCTV.

In 2006, he joined the band Bloodgood and has performed at several Christian rock festivals with them.

Fox has helped to develop artists and bands in Southern California including recent HMMA's Award Winning Metal Band Fellguard from Murrieta and Fiasco, (formerly known as Understated) from Rancho Cucamonga.

From 2006 to 2009, Fox gave private music lessons in Pasadena at a small music shop, Groovin on Music.

Beginning in 2008, Fox joined the Las Vegas based classic rock band "Playground" featuring Frank Di Mino from the rock group Angel. Playground has since hired other members, but he and DiMino now play in a tribute band called Vinyl Tattoo in Las Vegas.

In 2014, he produced the first full-length album by Oklahoma Christian metal band, Chaotic Resemblance, Get the Hell Out.

== Personal life ==
Fox married Annie Lobert, a former sex-worker for 16 years turned evangelical Christian, in Las Vegas, Nevada, on June 5, 2009. The ceremony was broadcast live on the Internet. Lobert has a ministry to sex-workers still on the streets called "Hookers for Jesus".

In August of 2018, Fox had a seizure while performing in Las Vegas and was taken to the hospital. There two masses were found in his head.

In March of 2021, Fox entered the hospital and had brain surgery to treat the tumor near his ear to reduce the risk of hearing loss, impacted balance, possible loss of vision and spinal problems. However, following the surgery, Fox suffered hearing loss in his left ear.

== Discography ==
=== Bloodgood ===
- 2009: Live in Norway DVD, Bloodgood (lead guitar & vocals)
- 2013: Dangerously Close, Bloodgood (lead guitar & vocals)

=== Guest appearances ===
- 1989: I 2 (EYE), Michael W. Smith (vocals on "All You're Missin' Is a Heartache")
- 1989: First Watch, Guardian (lead & vocals on "Hyperdrive")
- 1994: Scarecrow Messiah, Bride (guitar on "Doubt")
- 2000: Truth, Michael Sweet (guitar on "The Ever After")
- 2016: American Prodigal, Crowder (co-writer, acoustic guitar, electric guitar, & ganjo on "All You Burdens")
- 2020: Truth in Unity, Chris Catena's Rock City Tribe (guitar on "My Angel")

=== Other works ===
- 1998: SinDizzy, SinDizzy (lead vocals & guitar)
