= Stryper discography =

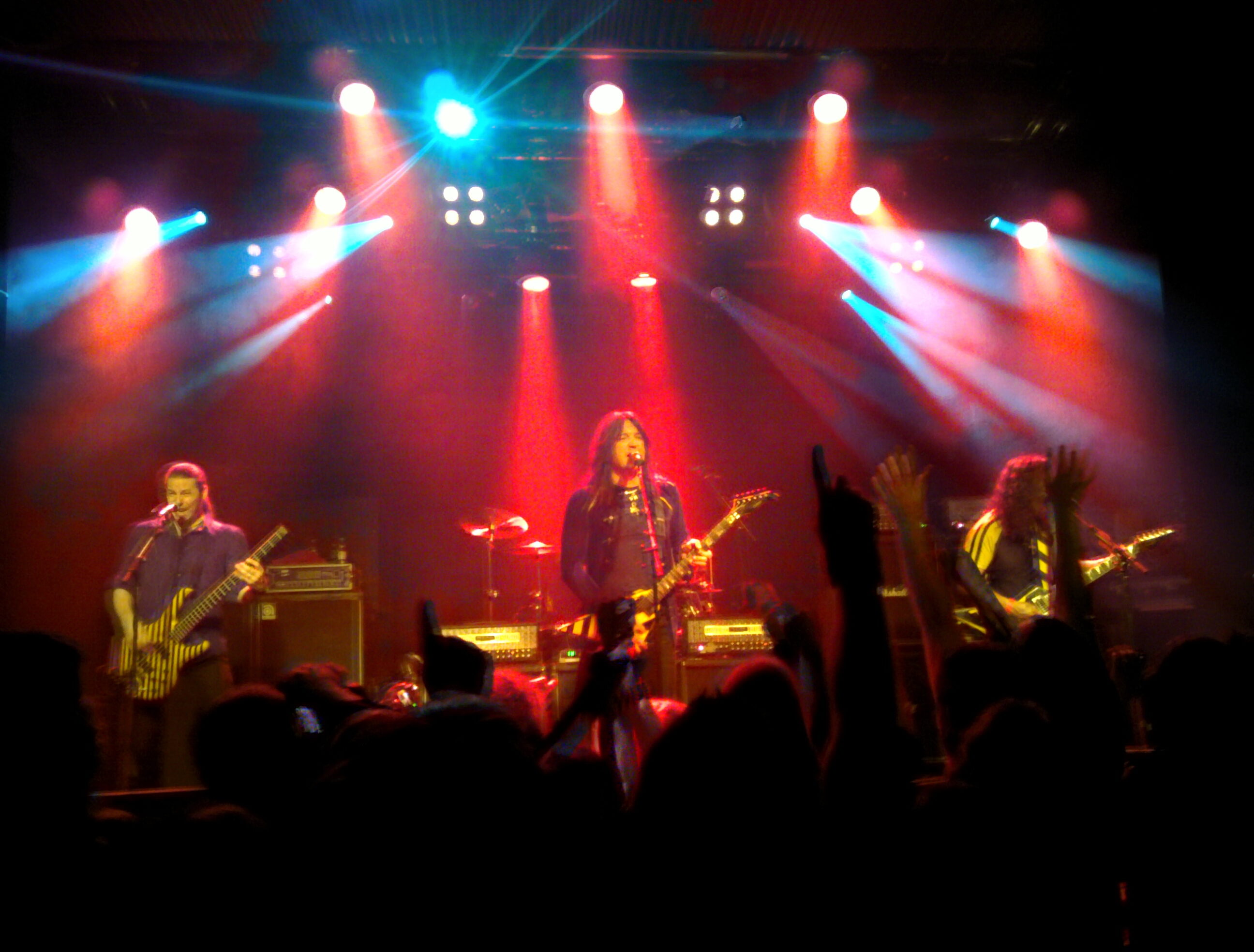
- Stryper performing in 2011
- Studio albums: 15
- Extended plays: 1
- Live albums: 4
- Compilation albums: 4
- Tribute albums: 3
- Singles: 19
- Video albums: 6
- Music videos: 32

The following is a comprehensive discography of Stryper, an American Christian metal band that originally formed in 1983.

== Albums ==
=== Studio albums ===
List of albums, with selected chart positions
Title	Album details	Peak chart positions										Certifications
Title	Album details	US	US Christ	BEL	FIN	GER	JPN	SPA	SWE	SWI	UK C&G	Certifications
The Yellow and Black Attack	Release date: July 21, 1984; Label: Enigma Records; Originally released as an EP, reissued in 1986 with two extra tracks	103	10	—	—	—	61	—	—	—	—	
Soldiers Under Command	Release date: Aug 23, 1985; Label: Enigma	84	5	—	—	—	78	—	—	—	—	RIAA: Gold
To Hell with the Devil	Release date: October 23, 1986; Label: Enigma	32	3	—	—	—	—	—	43	—	—	RIAA: Platinum; MC: Gold
In God We Trust	Release date: June 28, 1988; Label: Enigma	32	5	32	—	—	49	—	28	25	—	RIAA: Gold
Against the Law	Release date: August 21, 1990; Label: Hollywood	39	—	—	—	—	92	—	—	—	—	
Reborn	Release date: August 16, 2005; Label: Big3	111	4	—	—	—	193	—	—	—	—	
Murder by Pride	Release date: July 21, 2009; Label: Big3	73	2	—	—	—	—	—	—	—	—	
The Covering	Release date: February 15, 2011; Label: Big3; Cover album	175	9	—	—	—	—	—	—	—	—	
Second Coming	Release date: March 26, 2013; Label: Icarus Music; Re-recordings of old songs, with two new ones	117	11	—	—	—	—	—	—	—	14	
No More Hell to Pay	Release date: November 5, 2013; Label: Frontiers	35	2	—	—	—	119	—	—	—	2	
Fallen	Release date: October 16, 2015; Label: Frontiers	44	2	—	—	—	115	—	—	87	—	
God Damn Evil	Release date: April 20, 2018; Label: Frontiers	77	2	—	—	138	—	—	—	30	2	
Even the Devil Believes	Release date: September 4, 2020; Label: Frontiers	92	1	97	—	92	119	57	—	36	—	
The Final Battle	Release date: October 21, 2022; Label: Frontiers	— (Note: The Final Battle did not enter the Billboard 200, but peaked at No. 13 on the Top Album Sales.)	3	—	—	—	—	—	—	24	—	
To Hell with the Amps	Release date: June 7, 2024; Label: Stryper Recording LLC	— (Note: To Hell with the Amps is a retitled release of the limited edition Acouticyzed. It did not enter the Billboard 200.)	—	—	—	—	—	—	—	—	—	
When We Were Kings	Release date: September 13, 2024; Label: Frontiers	— (Note: When We Were Kings did not enter the Billboard 200, but peaked at No. 16 on the Top Album Sales.)	2	—	—	—	—	—	—	38	—	
Throne of Thorns	Release date: September 25, 2026; Label: Frontiers	— (Note: When We Were Kings did not enter the Billboard 200, but peaked at No. 17 on the Top Album Sales.)	4	—	—	—	—	—	—	14	3	
"—" denotes a recording that did not chart, was not released in that territory, or where the chart did not exist at that time.

=== Christmas albums ===
List of Christmas albums, with selected chart positions
Title	Details	Peak chart positions		
Title	Details	US Top	US Christ	SWI
The Greatest Gift of All	Released: November 21, 2025; Label: Frontiers Records; Formats: CD, LP, digital download	41	12	25

=== Live albums ===
List of live albums
Title	Release date
7 Weeks: Live in America, 2003	May 18, 2004
Extended Versions	October 31, 2006
Greatest Hits: Live in Puerto Rico	July 26, 2007
Live at the Whisky	September 23, 2014

=== Compilation albums ===
List of compilation albums
Title	Release date
Can't Stop the Rock	July 20, 1991
7: The Best of Stryper	March 25, 2003
The Roxx Regime Demos	July 10, 2007
Icon	January 7, 2014

== Singles ==
=== As lead artist ===
List of singles, with selected chart positions
Title	Year	Peak chart positions				Album
Title	Year	US	US Christ CHR	US Christ Rock	UK	Album
"Reason for the Season"	1985	—	—	—	—	The Yellow and Black Attack
"Together as One"	1985	—	3	13	—	Soldiers Under Command
"Reach Out"	1985	—	—	2	—	Soldiers Under Command
"Free"	1987	—	—	2	—	To Hell with the Devil
"Calling on You"	1987	—	—	2	—	To Hell with the Devil
"Honestly"	1987	23	13	—	—	To Hell with the Devil
"Always There for You"	1988	71	4	1	92	In God We Trust
"I Believe in You"	1988	88	6	2	—	In God We Trust
"Keep the Fire Burning"	1989	—	—	7	—	In God We Trust
"Shining Star" (Earth, Wind & Fire cover)	1990	—	—	—	—	Against the Law
"Bleeding from the Inside Out"	2013	—	—	—	—	Second Coming
"No More Hell to Pay"	2013	—	—	—	—	No More Hell to Pay
"Fallen"	2015	—	—	—	—	Fallen
"God Damn Evil"	2019	—	—	—	—	God Damn Evil
"Rise to the Call"	2022	—	—	—	—	The Final Battle
"See No Evil, Hear No Evil"	2022	—	—	—	—	The Final Battle
"End of Days"	2024	—	—	—	—	When We Were Kings
"Unforgivable"	2025	—	—	—	—	When We Were Kings
"Still the Light"	2025	—	—	—	—	The Greatest Gift of All
"I'm Alright (I'm Okay)"	2026	—	—	21	—	Throne of Thorns
"—" denotes a recording that did not chart or was not released in that territory.

=== As featured artist ===
List of featured singles, with selected chart positions
Title	Year	Peak chart positions		Album
Title	Year	US Christ	US Christ Digital	Album
"To Hell with the Devil (RISE)" (For King & Country featuring Lecrae and Stryper)	2024	44	10	Unsung Hero (Soundtrack)
"—" denotes a recording that did not chart or was not released in that territory.

=== Promotional singles ===
List of promotional singles
Title	Year	Album
"Soldiers Under Command"	1985	Soldiers Under Command
"To Hell With the Devil"	1986	To Hell With the Devil
"All of Me"	1986	To Hell With the Devil
"My Love I'll Always Show"	1986	The Yellow and Black Attack (reissue)
"Al Diablo Con El Demonio"	1986	Non-album single
"The Reign"	1989	In God We Trust
"Two Time Woman"	1991	Against the Law
"Make You Mine"	2005	Reborn
"All Over Again"	2015	Fallen
"After Forever"	2015	Fallen
"Take It to the Cross"	2018	God Damn Evil
"Sorry"	2018	God Damn Evil
"Lost"	2018	God Damn Evil
"Blood from Above"	2020	Even the Devil Believes
"Make Love Great Again"	2020	Even the Devil Believes
"Transgressor"	2022	The Final Battle
"Same Old Story"	2022	The Final Battle
"Grateful"	2024	When We Were Kings
"Love's Symphony"	2024	When We Were Kings
"When We Were Kings"	2024	When We Were Kings
"Winter Wonderland"	2025	The Greatest Gift of All
"On This Holy Night"	2025	The Greatest Gift of All

== Videos ==
List of videos by Stryper
Title	Album details	Certifications
Live in Japan	Release date: February 8, 1986; Label: Enigma	Platinum
In the Beginning	Release date: November 1, 1988; Label: Enigma	Gold
Stryper Expo 2000	Release date: 2000; Label: Planet Rapture Productions	
Stryper Expo 2001	Release date: 2001; Label: Planet Rapture Productions	
Greatest Hits: Live in Puerto Rico	Release date: April 24, 2006; Label: Fifty Three Five Creative Worx Entertainment	
Live in Indonesia at the Java Rockin' Land	Release date: October 2012; Label: Fifty Three Five	

== Tributes ==
- Various artists: Sweet Family Music: A Tribute to Stryper (1996)
- Guardian: The Yellow and Black Attack Is Back! (1999)
- Various artists: Isaiah 53:5 (1999)

== Music videos ==
- "Soldiers Under Command" (1986)
- "Calling on You" (1986)
- "Free" (1986)
- "Honestly" (1986)
- "All of Me (1986)
- "Always There for You" (1988)
- "I Believe in You" (1988)
- "Shining Star" (1990)
- "Two Time Woman" (1990)
- "Lady" (1990)
- "God" (2011)
- "No More Hell to Pay" (2013)
- "Sympathy" (2013)
- "Revelation" (Lyric Video) (2013)
- "Pride" (2015)
- "All Over Again" (2015)
- "The Valley" (2018)
- "Sorry" (2018)
- "Do Unto Others" (2020)
- "Divider" (2020)
- "Same Old Story" (2022)
- "Transgressor" (2022)
- "Rise To The Call" (Lyric Video) (2022)
- "Near" (Lyric Video) (2022)
- "When We Were Kings" (2024)
- "Betrayed By Love" (2024)
- "End Of Days" (Lyric Video) (2024)
- "On This Holy Night" (Lyric Video) (2025)
- "Still The Light" (Lyric Video) (2025)
- "Winter Wonderland" (Lyric Video) (2025)
- "Throne Of Thorns" (2026)
- "Here In Your Heart" (2026)
