= Truth (disambiguation) =

Truth is a concept most often used to mean in accord with fact or reality, or fidelity to an original or to a standard or ideal.

Truth may also refer to:

== Music ==
=== Albums ===
- Truth!, 1970 album by Houston Person
- Truth? (album), 1997 album by Sugizo
- Truth (Guy King album) 2016
- Truth (Jeff Beck album), 1968
- Truth (Robben Ford album), 2007
- Truth (Duke Jordan album), 1983
- T.R.U.T.H. (Guy Sebastian album), 2020
- Truth (Southern Sons album), 1993
- Truth (1998 Michael Sweet album), demo album
- Truth (2000 Michael Sweet album), the full-length version
- Truth (T-Square album), 1987
- Truth (Talisman album), 1998

=== Songs ===
- "Truth" (Bloc Party song), from the 2012 album Four
- "Truth" (Chiddy Bang song), from the 2010 album The Swelly Express
- "Truth" (Chingiz song), 2019 song that represented Azerbaijan in the Eurovision Song Contest 2019
- "Truth" (CNBLUE song), from the 2014 album Wave
- "Truth" (Godsmack song), from the 2023 album Lighting Up the Sky
- "Truth" (Seether song), from the 2004 album Karma and Effect
- "Truth" (Yuna Ito song), from the 2006 album Heart
- "Truth / Kaze no Mukō e", a single by Arashi
- "Truth?", a song by Def Leppard from their 1996 album Slang
- "Truth", a song by Alex Ebert from his 2011 album Alexander
- "Truth", a song by Janet Jackson from her 2001 album All for You
- "Truth", a song by Duke Jordan from his 1983 album Truth
- "Truth", a song by Gwen Stefani from her 2016 album This Is What the Truth Feels Like
- "Truth", a song by Katy Perry from her 2024 album 143 (Katy Perry album)
- "Truth", a song by Michael Sweet from his 1998 album Truth
- "Truth", a song by Michael Sweet from his 2000 album Truth
- "Truth", a song by Taemin from his 2019 album Want
- "Truth", a song by T-Square from their 1987 album Truth
- "Truth", a song by Twice from their 2015 album The Story Begins

=== Groups ===
- Truth (American band), Christian music group
- Truth (duo), a dubstep production duo from Christchurch, New Zealand

== Film ==
- Truth (2013 film), an American psychological thriller film
- Truth (2015 film), an American political docudrama film starring Cate Blanchett and Robert Redford
- Truth: Live in St. Petersburg, live DVD by t.A.T.u.

== Television ==
- "Truths" (Dark), a 2017 episode
- "Truth" (The Falcon and the Winter Soldier), a 2021 episode
- "Truth" (Silo), a 2023 episode

== Literature ==
- "Truth", a lyric poem by Geoffrey Chaucer
- Truth (plays), 1923 and 1926 fantasy plays by George Sterling
- Truth (novel), 2009 novel by Peter Temple

== Periodicals ==
=== Australia ===
- Barrier Daily Truth, in Broken Hill, Australia
- Truth, several Australian tabloid newspapers, associated in varying degrees with John Norton (journalist):
  - Truth (Adelaide newspaper)
  - Truth (Brisbane newspaper)
  - Truth (Melbourne newspaper)
  - Truth (Perth newspaper)
  - Truth (Sydney newspaper)

=== Elsewhere ===
- Truth (British periodical), dedicated to investigative journalism, published 1877–1957
- Truth (magazine), an American magazine, published 1881–1905
- The Elkhart Truth, an American daily newspaper in Elkhart, Indiana
- New Zealand Truth, in Auckland, New Zealand
- Adevărul ("The Truth"), a Romanian daily newspaper in Bucharest
- La Verità ("The Truth"), an Italian daily newspaper in Milan
- Pravda ("The Truth"), a Russian broadsheet newspaper
- Pravda ("Truth"), a Slovakian daily newspaper
- Tiesa ("Truth"), a defunct Lithuanian newspaper
- Truth: Red, White & Black, a comic book series

== Religion ==
- Truth (Buddhism)
- Truth (religious)
- Two by Twos, a home-based church movement referred to by its membership as Truth or The Truth
- Truth Magazine (religious magazine), published by the Guardian of Truth Foundation

== Other ==
- Truth (anti-tobacco campaign), advertising campaign against smoking
- Truth (Bernini), a 1645 sculpture by Bernini
- Truth (quantum number), value in quantum system of elementary particles
- Truthout, advocacy organization
- TRUTHS, the Traceable Radiometry Underpinning Terrestrial- and Helio- Studies satellite mission
- Objective truth, philosophical concept
- Prophet of Truth, character in video game series Halo
- Sojourner Truth (1797–1883), abolitionist and women's rights activist
- Truth Social, social media platform by Trump Media & Technology Group (TMTG)
- Truth value, value indicating the relation of a proposition to objective truth

== See also ==
- Pravda (disambiguation)
- The Truth (disambiguation)
- True (disambiguation)
- Veracity (disambiguation)
- Veritas (disambiguation)
- What is truth (disambiguation)
