= The Truth =

The Truth may refer to:

== Film ==
- The Truth (1920 film) starring Madge Kennedy
- The Truth (1960 film) or La Vérité, a French film by Henri-Georges Clouzot starring Brigitte Bardot
- Satyam (1976 film), titled translated to: The Truth, a 1976 Indian Tamil-language film
- The Truth (1988 film), a Hong Kong trial crime drama film by Taylor Wong
- The Truth (1998 film), an Indian Malayalam film by Shaji Kailas
- The Truth (2006 film), a British dark comic murder mystery
- The Truth (2012 film) or A Dark Truth, an American action thriller film by Damian Lee
- The Truth (2019 film), or La Vérité, a French-English drama film by Hirokazu Kore-eda

== Literature ==
- The Truth (novel), a 2000 Discworld novel by Terry Pratchett
- The Truth (with Jokes), a 2005 book by Al Franken
- The Truth: An Uncomfortable Book About Relationships, a 2015 book by Neil Strauss
- The Truth, a 2012 novel by Michael Palin
- Pauline Hanson: The Truth, a 1997 book by Australian politician Pauline Hanson
- The Truth, a 1874 religious treatise written by Charles J. Guiteau, the assassin of U.S. President James Garfield.

== Music ==
=== Artists ===
- The Truth (Australian band)
- The Truth (British band)
- The Truth (British rapper)
- Da' T.R.U.T.H. (born 1977), Christian rapper
- The Truth, a British vocal duo who released a version of The Beatles' "Girl" in 1966

=== Albums ===
- The Truth (Bleeding Through album) (2006)
- The Truth (Cherish album) (2008)
- The Truth (Aaron Hall album) (1993)
- The Truth (Ledisi album) (2014)
- The Truth (Prince album) (1997)
- The Truth (Matana Roberts and Pat Thomas album) (2020
- The Truth (Brady Seals album) (1997)
- The Truth (Beanie Sigel album) (2000)
- The Truth (Spice 1 album) (2005)
- The Truth (TRU album) (2005)
- The Truth (Young Sid album) (2007)
- The Truth, an album by Basic Element (2008)
- The Truth, an album by Ben Granfelt Band
- The Truth, an album by Consolation
- The-Truth!!!, an album by Tommy Turk

=== Songs ===
- "The Truth" (Jason Aldean song) (2009)
- "The Truth" (Kris Allen song) (2009)
- "The Truth" (Prince song) (1997)
- "The Truth" (Relient K song) (2005)
- "The Truth", by Gregg Alexander from Intoxifornication
- "The Truth", by Beanie Sigel from The Truth
- "The Truth", by Believer from the "Trilogy of Knowledge" suite from Dimensions
- "The Truth", by Clawfinger from Deaf Dumb Blind
- "The Truth", by Cosmic Gate from No More Sleep
- "The Truth", by DC Talk from Supernatural
- "The Truth", by DJ Kay Slay from The Streetsweeper, Vol. 2
- "The Truth", by Foster the People from Supermodel
- "The Truth", by Good Charlotte from The Chronicles of Life and Death
- "The Truth", by Handsome Boy Modeling School from So... How's Your Girl?
- "The Truth", by India Arie
- "The Truth", by James Blunt from Once Upon a Mind
- "The Truth", by Limp Bizkit from The Unquestionable Truth (Part 1)
- "The Truth", by Mýa
- "The Truth", by Nas from Magic
- "The Truth", by Pnau
- "The Truth", by Sentenced from Shadows of the Past
- "The Truth", by Seventh Wonder from Tiara
- "The Truth", by Toya from Toya
- "The Truth", by While She Sleeps from The North Stands for Nothing

== People ==
- Paul Darden or the Truth (born 1968), professional poker player
- Ron Killings or the Truth (born 1972), professional wrestler
- Paul Pierce or the Truth (born 1977), NBA forward
- Errol Spence Jr. or the Truth (born 1990), American boxer
- Brandon Vera or the Truth (born 1977), mixed martial artist
- Carl Williams (boxer) or the Truth (1959–2013), American boxer

== Television ==
- The Truth (2008 TV series), a Singaporean Chinese modern suspense drama
- The Truth (2011 TV series) or The Other Truth, a Hong Kong legal drama series
- The Truth, a Japanese suspense drama starring Shota Matsuda
- "The Truth" (The O.C.), a 2004 episode of The O.C.
- "The Truth" (Seinfeld), a 1991 episode of Seinfeld
- "The Truth" (The X-Files), an episode of The X-Files
- The Truth (Chinese TV series), a Chinese crime drama series

== Other uses ==
- The Truth (character), a character in Grand Theft Auto: San Andreas
- The Truth (play), a 1906 or 1907 play by Clyde Fitch
- The Truth (podcast), a storytelling podcast
- TheTruth.com, a website for the anti-smoking organization called Truth
- The Truth, a name used among its members for the Two by Twos church
- The Truth, a name used among Jehovah's Witnesses to describe their religion
- The Elkhart Truth, a newspaper
- "The Truth", the headline used by The Sun in their coverage of the Hillsborough disaster

== See also ==
- Truth (disambiguation)
