= Ethan Brosh =

American guitarist

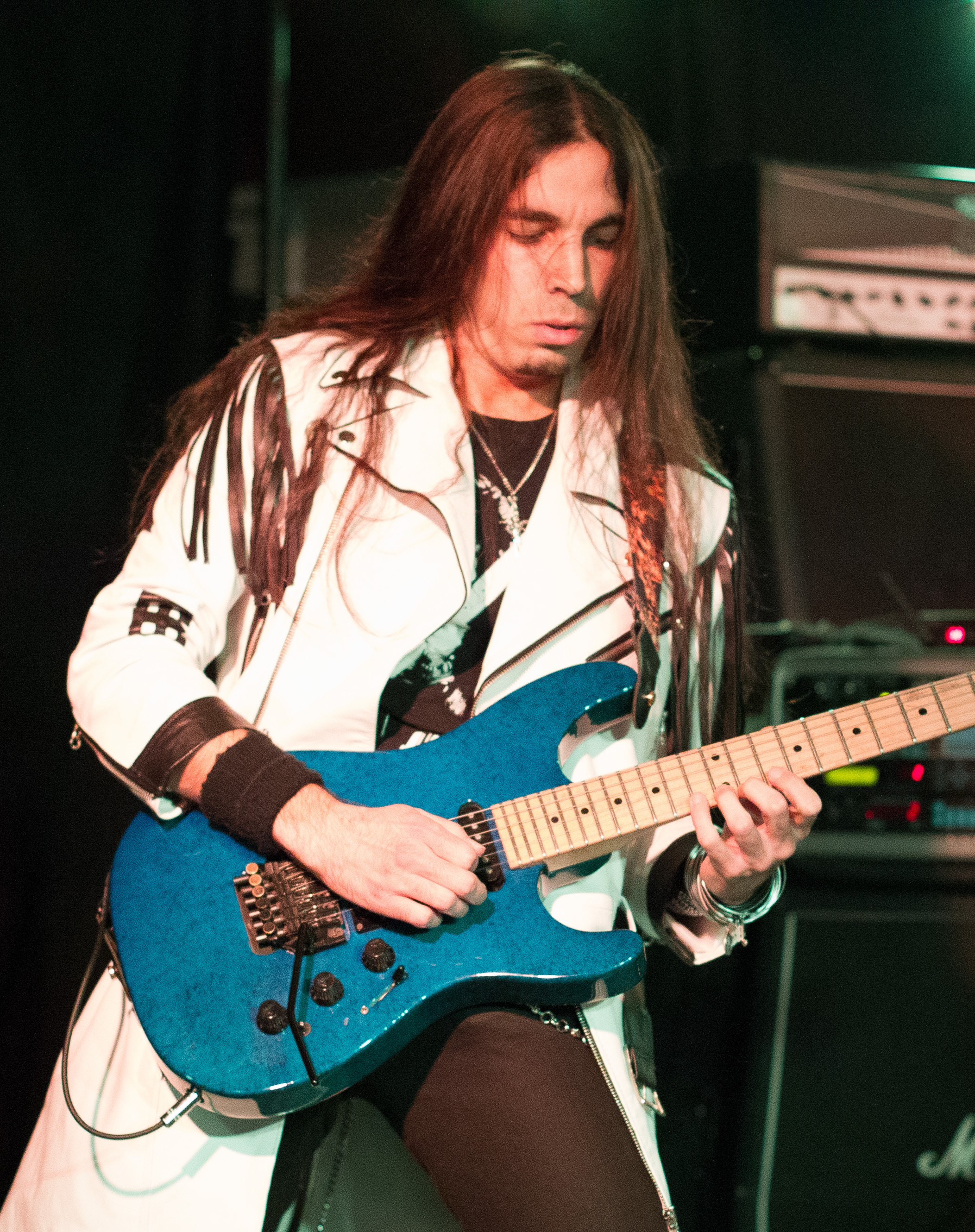
- Brosh performing in 2012

Background information
- Born: Suffern, New York, U.S.
- Genres: Hard rock; instrumental rock; heavy metal
- Occupation: Guitarist
- Years active: 2001–present
- Labels: Magna Carta; Rocker; Monster Tone
- Member of: Burning Heat
- Formerly of: Angels of Babylon

Ethan Brosh is an American rock guitarist from Boston, Massachusetts. He is best known for his solo work and for his work as the lead guitarist in the band Burning Heat.

== Early life ==
Growing up in Israel, Brosh took piano lessons briefly at a young age, after being inspired by classical music and the composer Bach. He later became intrigued by hearing his brother's cassette tape of Iron Maiden album Number of the Beast at the age of 11 and picked up classical and electric guitar at age 12.

Brosh moved to the United States in 2001 where he became a student at the Berklee College of Music. He graduated with honors in 2004 and then returned as a part-time teacher in 2008 till present.

== Career ==
Brosh was signed to Magna Carta Records which released his debut instrumental album Out of Oblivion and distributed it worldwide on March 24, 2009. The album features Mike Mangini (Dream Theater, Extreme, Steve Vai) on drums and guest appearances by George Lynch (Dokken, Lynch Mob), Greg Howe (Michael Jackson) and Joe Stump (Holy Hell). The album was mixed and mastered by Chris Tsangarides (Judas Priest, Yngwie Malmsteen). The album artwork was created by Derek Riggs the long time artist of Iron Maiden.

Additionally, he was the guitar player of the band Angels of Babylon along with Rhino (Manowar, Holy Hell) and David Ellefson (Megadeth). The debut album, Kingdom of Evil was released on January 29, 2010, on Metal Heaven Records in Europe, In May 2010 on Hydrant Records in Japan, and on July 29 on BurnHill Union Records in America and the rest of the world. Angels of Babylon was featured in several magazines worldwide as well as having some radio support in different countries.

Brosh is known for his love of vintage 1980s amplifiers and guitars such as the Fender HM Strat, Washburn EC29, BC Rich Gunslinger and ADA MP1 Preamp In more recent years Brosh has been exclusively playing through the ISP Technologies Theta amp in all its different versions.

In June 2012, Brosh released a music video for his song "Downward Spiral" off of his Out of Oblivion album. The song and video feature George Lynch of Dokken and Lynch Mob. On April 24, 2013, Brosh's band started a massive 25 city US/CANADA tour as the direct support of Yngwie Malmsteen with his sister Nili Brosh as second guitarist.

Brosh released his second solo instrumental album on March 4, 2014, through Carmine Appice's Rocker Records. The album was mixed by world class producer Max Norman who came out of retirement for this project after almost 20 years away from the music industry. The album was mastered by mastering engineer Bob Ludwig at Gateway Mastering in Portland, Maine, and has an appearance by bass player David Ellefson of Megadeth. The album artwork is an original painting done by artist Joe Petagno.

After getting to know Carmine Appice, Brosh joined Carmine and his brother Vinnie Appice as the guitar player of their show Drum Wars. Later on in 2014 a live album called Drum Wars Live! was released with Brosh being the guitar player on it. Also during the years 2014 and 2015 The Ethan Brosh Band went on a couple of tours supporting another one of Brosh's guitar heroes in Jake E. Lee with his new band Red Dragon Cartel.

In the summer of 2015 Brosh played guitar in one of his favorite bands Steelheart as they performed at the Pentaport rock festival in South Korea opening for the Scorpions. Brosh provided guitar tracks on Stryper front man Michael Sweet's 2016 solo album One Sided War. Two Michael Sweet music videos featuring Brosh were made: one for the song "Bizarre" and the other for the song "Creator".

In 2017, the Ethan Brosh Band got back on the road for more tour dates as the direct support act for guitar player Uli Jon Roth.

In February 2018, Brosh released his third studio instrumental album, Conspiracy, again featuring mixing engineer Max Norman, with mastering by Brad Blackwood and artwork by Derek Riggs. It also features a guest appearance by Steel Panther guitarist Satchel on the song "Tomb of the Gods", which is also the first video from the album. The guest solo by Satchel can be heard on the album version. The video was created by Enver Perez.

== Discography ==
=== Solo ===
- Out of Oblivion (2009), Magna Carta Records
- Prog Around the World (2009), Magna Carta Records
- Live The Dream (2014), Rocker Records
- Drum Wars Live! (2014), Rocker Records
- Conspiracy (2018), Monster Tone Records

=== With Angels of Babylon ===
- Kingdom of Evil (2010), Burnhill Union Records
- Thundergod Scarlett Records (2013), Rigs Productions

=== With Michael Sweet ===
- One Sided War (2016), Rat Pak Records
- TEN (2019), Rat Pak Records
