= The Greatest Gift of All (Stryper album) =

Studio album by Stryper
- Released: November 21, 2025
- Recorded: April 2025
- Genre: Christian rock; heavy metal
- Length: 39:55
- Label: Frontiers
- Producer: Michael Sweet

Stryper chronology
When We Were Kings (2024)	The Greatest Gift of All (2025)	Throne of Thorns (2026)

Singles from The Greatest Gift of All
- 1. "Still the Light" Released: July 29, 2025

The Greatest Gift of All is the first Christmas album and twenty-first album overall recorded by American Christian metal band Stryper. The album was released on November 21, 2025, via Frontiers Records, to digital, CD and LP formats. It was written by produced by Michael Sweet.

The album was supported by the release of one single, "Still the Light", and two promotional singles, "Winter Wonderland" and "On This Holy Night".

== Release and promotion ==
For several months before the release of the album's first single, Stryper teased songs from the album to somedia.

The lead single from The Greatest Gift of All, titled "Still the Light", was officially released on July 20, 2025. Upon the single's release, the complete album, The Greatest Gift of All, was announced, with its release date scheduled for late 2025. "Still the Light" was supported by the release of a lyric video.

"Winter Wonderland" was released on September 22, 2025, as a promotional single, supported by a lyric video. With the song's release, The Greatest Gift of All was made available for preorder. On October 31, 2025, "On This Holy Night" was released as a promotional single, also supported by a lyric video. The song is themed around the idea that the world has taken Jesus out of Christmas. It was intended to sound "dark and heavy" and as a result was intentionally released on Halloween.

The Greatest Gift of All was released exclusively to physical formats.

== Recording and production ==
Stryper had initially been planning on recording a Christmas album for over 40 years, but the band could not find a time to do so.

The Greatest Gift of All was recorded in April 2025. It features five traditional Christmas songs, and five original tracks. Two of the songs, "Reason for the Season" and "Winter Wonderland", are re-recordings of songs that appeared on Stryper's major label debut, The Yellow and Black Attack.

== Development ==
Sweet, Stryper's lead vocalist, said of the album:

This album has its own unique signature to it and it’s becoming a favorite of mine. There’s just something about it that’s really special and unique. An album we’ve wanted to do for so many years and here we are. We tried some different things on this album in terms of the sound but yet we didn’t venture too far away from who we are and what we do. It’s 100% Stryper yet it has some new flavors here and there and it’s really amazing how it turned out. It will be released this year.

— Michael Sweet, Stryper

== Lyrics and meaning ==
The Greatest Gift of All has been noted for its explicitly Christian focus. Bailey wrote that the album sought to "keep Christ in Christmas", while Jay Heilman of Today's Christian Entertainment praised the album for honoring "the true meaning of Christmas". Underdown observed that the original songs "revel in the 'reason for the season', looking not just at Jesus' lasting impact on the world". "On This Holy Night", in particular, received attention for its more critical approach to this; the song addresses society's tendency to remove Jesus from Christmas celebrations. Critics also praised the emotional tone of the album's traditional songs; Metal Temple praised the album's "deep and emotional meaning". Bravewords made note of its "unmistakable mix of faith, power, and metal energy".

== Style ==
The Greatest Gift of All implements the sound of Stryper as well as traditional Christmas music. Andrew Rockwell of Angelic Warlord wrote that the album possessed a "unique signature that embodies both the Stryper classic sound, but at the same time it's got that undeniable modern-era Stryper sound too". Several critics also observed the album's ability to contain heavy metal and hard rock influences alongside other elements such as bells, choirs, organs, and acoustic arrangements. Critics frequently made note of the balance between original material and reinterpretations of Christmas standards. Reggie Edwards of The Front Row Report stated that the album alternated "between Christmas classic and Christmas original, giving a seamless balance". John Underdown of Jesus Freak Hideout observed that the first two original tracks carried "a more punk rock feel" than the band's recent material, while still maintaining the group's recognizable style.

Critics also praised the band's ability to reinterpret traditional Christmas songs. Daniel Hoehr of Knac.com wrote that the band demonstrated "a great deal of musical sensitivity and no less good taste" because of their ability to record the songs in the style of "incredible heavy metal". Sean Bailey of The Metal Resource similarly praised the album's "range of dynamics and tempos" and its "clear production". Primarily, The Greatest Gift of All demonstrates the styles of Christian rock and heavy metal.

== Critical reception ==
Professional ratings
Review scores
Source	Rating
Angelic Warlord	80%
Earshot.at	3.5/5 stars
Jesus Freak Hideout	4/5 stars
Knac.com	4/5 stars
Metal Express Radio	6/10
The Metal Resource	9/10
Metal Temple	7/10
The Metalcore	3.3/5 stars
Rewind It	3/5 stars
Today's Christian Entertainment	4.5/5 stars

Speaking for Today's Christian Entertainment, Jay Heilman reviewed that "The structure of the album is balanced perfectly," elaborating that, "It is split roughly down the middle, featuring one half of traditional tunes and the other half comprised of originals". He also noted that "Michael Sweet's voice has, quite honestly, never sounded better". Heilman stated that the album is "long overdue," although "absolutely well worth the wait". John Underdown of Jesus Freak Hideout observed that the album "sounds like Stryper", however, it contains "subtle changes that bring a freshness the band has long needed." He states that it contains a "punk rock feel".

== Track listing ==
All tracks are written by Michael Sweet.

No.	Title	Length
1.	"The Greatest Gift of All"	3:14
2.	"Go Tell It on the Mountain"	3:06
3.	"Heaven Came (On Christmas Day)"	4:07
4.	"Little Drummer Boy"	4:06
5.	"Still the Light"	4:02
6.	"Silent Night"	3:22
7.	"On This Holy Night"	4:33
8.	"Joy to the World"	3:25
9.	"Reason for the Season"	6:51
10.	"Winter Wonderland"	3:09
Total length:		39:55

== Charts ==
Chart performance for The Greatest Gift of All
Chart (2025)	Peak position
Swiss Albums (Schweizer Hitparade)	52
US Top Album Sales (Billboard)	41
US Top Christian Albums (Billboard)	12
US Top Holiday Albums (Billboard)	43

== Release history ==
Release history and formats for The Greatest Gift of All
Region	Date	Format(s)	Label(s)	Ref.
Various	November 21, 2025	CD; LP	Frontiers Records	
