= Havalina (disambiguation) =

Havalina may refer to:

- Havalina, a rock band from Long Beach, California that took its name from the song "Havalina" by Pixies
- "Havalina", a song by the band Pixies from their 1990 album Bossanova (Pixies album)
- Javalina, a pig-like animal
