= Havalina Rail Co. (album) =

Studio album by Havalina Rail Co.
- Released: 1994
- Genres: Folk, swing, jazz, zydeco, rock
- Length: 1:05:48
- Label: Tooth and Nail Records
- Producer: Havalina

Havalina Rail Co. chronology
Havalina Rail Co. (1994)	The Diamond in the Fish (1996)

Havalina Rail Co. is the first studio album by the American eclectic rock band Havalina Rail Co., released in 1994.

In an interview for KPSU, Wignall commented that the first album was "this sort of finding our path and gravitating towards American sounds". The album featured folk, swing, jazz, zydeco, and rock influences; according to Matt Wignall, the swing influence led many to falsely assume that the band was part of the contemporary Swing revival.

== Track listing ==
1. "Ragtime" (2:36)
2. "One Day" (3:38)
3. "Proportion Thing" (3:09)
4. "Things" (3:37)
5. "Grass Roots" (1:55)
6. "Cruis'n" (3:03)
7. "2/4" (2:09)
8. "Green Skies" (1:45)
9. "If You Leave" (3:17)
10. "French Theme" (3:45)
11. "New Song" (6:56)
12. "3.14" (4:17)
13. "Big Lu" (5:28)
14. "Laconic" (0:32)
15. "Sha La La" (3:25)
16. "Train Song" / "Take You Rid’n in My Car" (5:18)
17. "I Change My Clothes" (4:18)
18. "This Monkey Doesn't Take Nickels and Dimes (4:42)
19. "Moon River (!)" (1:58)

All songs written by Havalina Rail Co., except "Take You Rid’n in My Car" written by Woody Guthrie, and "Moon River" written by Johnny Mercer and Henry Mancini.

== Personnel ==
=== Havalina Rail Co. lineup ===
- Daniel J. Brooker: Accordion, piano
- Matt Wignall: Guitar, banjo, primary vocalist
- Jeff T. Suri: Drums, piano, vocals
- Grady McFerrin: Trumpet, washboard
- Mark Cole: Percussion, extra noise
- Orlando Greenhill: Double bass, bass guitar

=== Guest musicians ===
- Nathan Jensen: Saxophone
- Julie Musali: Vocals on "Proportion Thing" and "Moon River"
- "John from Riverside": Clarinet on "If You Leave"
- G.N.O. Crew ("Janna, Debbie, Kara, Charis, Allisa, Lori, Julie, Liz, Destiny, and Samantha"): Vocals on "Train Song" and "New Song"
- Bob Moon: Rolling on "Cruis'n"
- "King 'S'": Background vocals on "One Day"
- Deana Yang: Strings
- Jennifer Marliniak: Strings

== Notes ==
"Train Song" ends with a cover of "Take You Rid'n In My Car".

It is ambiguous whether saxophonist Nathan Jensen is a member of the band or a guest musician on this album. He is listed as a guest musician in the liner notes, but during the bridge of "New Song", Matt Wignall calls out the names of all the members of the band and he includes Nathan among them. (Nathan was clearly listed as a member of the band on the later albums The Diamond in the Fish and Russian Lullabies.)
