= Burban =

Musical subculture

- Stylistic origins: R&B • hip hop • grime • UK garage • Bhangra • Indian folk • Bollywood
- Cultural origins: 2010s–present, London, United Kingdom

Regional scenes
- London, Luton, Birmingham, Manchester

Burban (portmanteau of "brown urban") is a musical sub-culture and an attempt to unify urban musicians of Asian descent. The idea has caused a split amongst the bigger artists and critics due to the ambiguity of the term itself. The common misconception of burban is that it is a musical genre of Asian origin, which is incorrect. Burban is a sub-culture of hip hop/R&B music, focused on artists of Asian background. The reason behind this was to abolish the term "urban desi", which commonly pigeon-holed hip hop artists as 'desi' artists.

== History ==
=== 2000s: Urban Asian origins ===
After years of stigma being associated with the term 'urban desi' and the confusion of it supposedly being a genre, which was used by the majority of national media, a select few artists decided to destroy, recreate and bring in the new term for the sub-culture, 'burban'. However, the 'B' stands for 'brown' and there was criticism that it might prejudice against the universality of music. Many Asian artists have refused to use the term (notably Sam Kay), but a growing number have decided to rebrand themselves by the word burban. As the movement is in its infancy, there has been much confusion and deliberation of the semantics of burban.

=== 2010s: The birth of burban ===
The 2011 Brit Asia Awards ceremony was the birthplace, and official confirmation of the burban movement. A performance by rapper Shizzio got the entire theatre talking after a showcase with fifteen artists. An all-star cast finished Shizzio's record "Come Get Some", with Drilla Kid, Swami Baracus, Kazz Kumar, Raxstar, Kee, Metz & Trix, PSG, Jammer, Shabba D and Big Narstie performing, before a final bow with the entire crew on stage. The term burban had been used before (for example, the original "Burban Cypher" was uploaded onto YouTube on 25 July 2011) but was given context on 1 October 2011 at the awards ceremony.

=== Level of support ===
The level of support for "burban" artists has traditionally been questionable, prompting the need for a rebranding. However, there have been notable champions: presenters from Buzz Asia including Doni Brasco and Amy K, Sumit of The Hip Hop Chronicle, DJs such as Dreypa, Fricktion and Jesal, and the BBC Asian Network's Bobby Friction, Nihal, DJ Kayper and Kan D Man. In 2011 (and continuing into 2012), there had been a wider circle of support growing. Journalists such as Asjad Nazir (of Eastern Eye) included features and interviews on artists from the scene. The website SuperCritic.tv (now taken over by Jesal) was the first website to critically assess the music (and score it); in the process giving birth to new sites such as The Brown Scene and Burban Blog. TV channels, such as Brit Asia, playlisted various artists, and gave interview shows to musicians such as Shizzio, whilst Kiss TV created the Asian Beats Chart Show (with the help of PR gurus Terry Mardi and Pedro Carvalho). Whilst the impact on the charts has been negligible, there have been notable successes in newer forms of media; for example, Raxstar's video for "Jaaneman" gained over a million YouTube hits. There have, however, been voices of concern about the disambiguation with pre-existing or related forms of the word, although they appear to be dissipating as time progresses. However, the frequent criticism about the lack of a "unifying sound" remains.

=== Notable artists ===
- The Truth
- Raxstar
- Shizzio
