= America (Havalina album) =

Studio album by Havalina
- Released: 1999
- Length: 73:52
- Label: Jackson Rubio

Havalina chronology
Russian Lullabies (1999)	America (1999)	A Bullfighter's Guide to Space and Love EP (2000)

Professional ratings
Review scores
Source	Rating
The Phantom Tollbooth	(4.5/5)
Pitchfork Media	(7.2.10)
7ball	(not rated)

America by Havalina was released in 1999 on Wignalls' own label, Jackson Rubio. It is a musical tour of America by region and draws on many regional musical influences.

== Track listing ==
1. "Bovine Stomp" – 0:53
2. "American Skies" – 3:35
3. "Mexi Radio" – 0:21
4. "Puerco Chico" – 2:52
5. "Dark Skies" – 3:10
6. "Little Darl'n" – 5:28
7. "Travel Music I" – 0:42
8. "Miss. River" – 2:33
9. "Cajun Blue" – 2:58
10. "Travel Music II" – 0:50
11. "Bullfrog" – 8:02
12. "Travel Music III" – 0:42
13. "Flower Of The Desert" – 2:33
14. "Travel Music IV" – 0:38
15. "Feeling Green" – 1:16
16. "United State(s)" – 4:40
17. "Pick'n And Yodel" – 0:49
18. "Borris The Milkman" – 3:03
19. "Devil In The Cornfield" – 6:13
20. "Alaska" – 1:12
21. "Chips" – 0:32
22. "California" – 3:05
23. "Let's Not Forget Hawaii" – 6:52
24. "Keep Smil'n" – 4:30

== Personnel ==
- Matt Wignall - Vocals, Guitar, Lap Steel, Banjo, Mouth Harp, Harmonica
- Orlando Greenhill - Electric and Upright bass, Background Vocals
- Mark Cole - Percussion
- Jeff Suri - Drums, Vocals, Percussion
- Lori Suri - Washboard, Percussion, Background Vocals
- Erick Diego Nieto - Violin, Percussion
