= A Bullfighter's Guide to Space and Love =

EP by Havalina
- Released: 2001

Havalina chronology
America (1999)	A Bullfighter's Guide to Space and Love (2001)	Space, Love, & Bullfighting (2002)

A Bullfighter's Guide to Space and Love is an EP by the band Havalina. Serving as a prelude to the album Space, Love, & Bullfighting, this EP features alternate versions of three songs which would appear on the next album.

This is the first release to use the truncated name Havalina, cutting off Rail Co. from the name.

== Track listing ==
=== CD Release ===
1. "Space and Mexico"
2. "You Got Me Cry'n"
3. "Worst Days"
4. "Radio"
5. "Touched by the Moon"

=== Vinyl Release ===
Side 1

1. "Space and Mexico"
2. "You Got Me Cry'n"
3. "Abduction of the Bullfighter"

Side 2

1. "Worst Days"
2. "Radio"
3. "Touched by the Moon"
