= Him (album) =

Studio album by Michael Sweet
- Released: August 1, 2006
- Genre: Christian rock
- Labels: Dog and Pony
- Producer: Michael Sweet

Michael Sweet chronology
Truth (2000)	Him (2006)	Touched (2007)

Professional ratings
Review scores
Source	Rating
Jesus Freak Hideout	2/5 stars
The Phantom Tollbooth	3/5

Released August 1, 2006, Him is the fifth studio album from Christian rock singer and Stryper frontman Michael Sweet.

The album features a collection of traditional hymns arranged and re-written by Sweet himself. Sweet made a music video of "Take My Life" for the biblical movie, One Night with the King, based on the story of Esther. Sweet's daughter, Ellena Rae Sweet, can be seen dancing as a ballerina in the video.

== Track listing ==
1. "Calvary"
2. "Every Hour"
3. "I Know"
4. "Alleluia"
5. "I’ll Remember You"
6. "Gilead"
7. "Still"
8. "Take My Life"
9. "Surrender"
10. "Oh Holy Night"

== Personnel ==
- Michael Sweet - lead vocals, acoustic and electric guitars
- Kenny Lewis - keys
- Peter Vantine - strings, piano, keys
- LeRoix Hampton - strings, piano, keys
- Lou Spagnola - bass
- Tracy Ferrie - bass
- Dickie Paris - drums
- Chris Miles - bass on "Oh Holy Night"
