= Only to Rise =

Studio album by Sweet & Lynch
- Released: January 27, 2015
- Recorded: 2014
- Genres: Christian metal, Christian rock, hard rock
- Length: 49:28
- Label: Frontiers
- Producer: Michael Sweet

Sweet & Lynch chronology
Only To Rise (2015)	Unified (2017)

Michael Sweet chronology
I'm Not Your Suicide (2014)	Only to Rise (2015)	One Sided War (2016)

George Lynch chronology
Kill All Control (2011)	Only to Rise (2015)	Shadow Train (2015)

Only to Rise is the debut studio album by the duo Sweet & Lynch. Frontiers Records released the album on January 27, 2015.

== Reception ==
Professional ratings
Review scores
Source	Rating
CCM Magazine	4/5 stars
Christian Music Review	3.5/5
Christian Review Magazine	5/5 stars
Cross Rhythms	9/10 squares
Jesus Freak Hideout	4/5 stars
The Phantom Tollbooth	4/5

Specifying in a four star review by CCM Magazine, Andy Argyrakis realizes, "Hard rock never sounded sweeter... there's mounds of melodic sensibility at every turn, alongside positive messages spanning several facets of love to the undeniably divine." Bert Gangl, indicating in a four star review at Jesus Freak Hideout, recognizes, "Impressive though it may be, Only To Rise isn't completely devoid of drawbacks. As probing and sincere as the majority of Sweet's lyrics are, a small portion of them find the ever-passionate front man employing language that is either awkward or overused... And even though it hardly seems destined to convince legions of dyed-in-the-wool pop or alt-rock lovers to wipe their mp3 players clean and start from scratch, fans of Sweet and Lynch's previous band-based work, those who appreciate powerhouse vocals and consummate guitar work - or, really, anyone who wants to pretend the '90s never happened - will undoubtedly discover that Only To Rise is just what the good doctor ordered. " In a four out of five review, The Phantom Tollbooth's Bert Saraco, responds, "Only To Rise is 'sweet' indeed – a collaboration by musicians that are masters at what they do, and what they do is produce heavy rock and roll with one foot in the here-and-now and the other foot on a stage somewhere in the heart of classic rock." Signaling in a nine out of ten review from Cross Rhythms, Rob Birtley replies, "Throughout Sweet's Christian sensibilities shine through in the lyrics and the unlikely union with Lynch, whose nickname is 'Scary', is a thorough success." Jay Heilman, rating the album 3.5 out of five for Christian Music Review, writes, "Only To Rise was a great album and it was great to see Sweet away from STRYPER for a project." Writing a review for Christian Review Magazine, Christian St. John rating the album five stars, states, "honestly, each and every track on Only To Rise is excellent".

== Track listing ==
All tracks are written by Michael Sweet & George Lynch.

No.	Title	Length
1.	"The Wish"	3:38
2.	"Dying Rose"	3:41
3.	"Love Stays"	4:34
4.	"Time Will Tell"	3:51
5.	"Rescue Me"	4:13
6.	"Me Without You"	4:02
7.	"Recover"	3:42
8.	"Divine"	4:18
9.	"September"	4:17
10.	"Strength in Numbers"	3:18
11.	"Hero Zero"	4:11
12.	"Only to Rise"	3:43
Total length:		49:28

== Personnel ==
- Michael Sweet - lead vocals, guitars, production
- George Lynch - guitars
- James LoMenzo - bass guitar
- Brian Tichy - drums

== Charts ==
Chart (2015)	Peak position
US Billboard 200	120
US Top Christian Albums (Billboard)	4
US Top Hard Rock Albums (Billboard)	6
US Independent Albums (Billboard)	17
US Top Rock Albums (Billboard)	18
