= The Diamond in the Fish =

Studio album by Havalina
- Released: 1996
- Genre: Rock, jazz, blues, lounge
- Length: 55:05
- Label: Tooth and Nail Records
- Producer: Steve Hodges and Havalina Rail Co.

Havalina chronology
Havalina Rail Co. (1994)	The Diamond in the Fish (1996)	Russian Lullabies (1999)

The Diamond in the Fish
Review scores
Source	Rating
Cross Rhythms	8/10

The Diamond in the Fish is a studio album by the American eclectic rock band Havalina Rail Co., released 1996.

In his KPSU radio interview with Dave Cusik, Matt Wignall described the album: "We were experimenting with idea of like playing jazz, which incidentally, we kinda sucked at. And found out why most of the time all good jazz players are over fifty, 'cause it takes that long to get good at it."

== Track listing ==
1. "The Theme from the Diamond in the Fish" (1:07)
2. "If I Did Not Love You" (4:28)
3. "Ballad of a Spy" (5:13)
4. "Paper Moon" (5:07)
5. "Dominiques Library" (4:31)
6. "Ron" (7:40)
7. "No Brainer" (3:43)
8. "Emmanuel" (3:22)
9. "Prelude and Blues" (9:16)
10. "Hot Pants" (2:29)
11. "Banditos" (4:34)
12. "The Diamond in the Fish" (3:35)

== Personnel ==
=== Havalina Rail Co. lineup ===
- Matt Wignall: Guitar, primary vocalist
- Nathan Jenson: Saxophone, lead vocals on "Paper Moon" and "Prelude and Blues"
- Orlando Greenhill: Double bass, bass guitar
- Jeff T. Suri: Drums, vocals
- Mark Cole: Percussion
- Lori Ann Hoopes: Washboard, vocals

=== Guest musicians ===
- Sierra Heart: Vocals
- Brian Wallace: Saw on "Ron".

== Notes ==
An alternate version of "Dominique's Library" appeared on the Tooth And Nail Records sampler Art Core Vol. 1.

The songs "Banditos" and "The Diamond in the Fish" were later rerecorded for the retrospective We Remember Anarchy.
