= When We Were Kings (Stryper album) =

Studio album by Stryper
- Released: September 13, 2024
- Genres: Christian metal; heavy metal; hard rock
- Length: 45:48
- Label: Frontiers
- Producer: Michael Sweet

Stryper chronology
The Final Battle (2022)	When We Were Kings (2024)	The Greatest Gift of All (2025)

Singles from When We Were Kings
- 1. "When We Were Kings" Released: 2024

When We Were Kings is the twentieth release and sixteenth studio album by Christian metal band Stryper, produced by frontman Michael Sweet and released on September 13, 2024. A month before its release, the band released the self titled track music video.

== Critical reception ==
Professional ratings
Review scores
Source	Rating
Jesus Freak Hideout	3.5/5 stars
Metal Injection	8/10
Metal Temple	8/10
BraveWords	8/10

== Track listing ==
When We Were Kings track listing
No.	Title	Length
1.	"End of Days"	4:20
2.	"Unforgivable"	4:01
3.	"When We Were Kings"	4:01
4.	"Betrayed by Love"	4:32
5.	"Loves Symphony"	4:15
6.	"Trinity"	4:10
7.	"Rhyme of Time"	4:31
8.	"Raptured"	3:44
9.	"Grateful"	4:01
10.	"Divided by Design"	4:48
11.	"Imperfect World"	3:25
Total length:		45:48

== Personnel ==
Stryper

- Michael Sweet – lead vocals, lead guitars
- Robert Sweet – drums, backing vocals
- Oz Fox – lead guitars, backing vocals
- Perry Richardson – bass, backing vocals

Additional personnel

- Charles Foley – backing vocals
- Keith Pittman – backing vocals
- Paul McNamara – organ, synthesizer (Moog), keys

== Charts ==
Chart (2024)	Peak position
Swiss Albums (Schweizer Hitparade)	38
US Top Christian Albums (Billboard)	2
US Top Album Sales (Billboard)	16
US Top Hard Rock Albums (Billboard)	25
