= Laura Bynum =

American author

- Born: February 28, 1968 (age 58); Springfield, Illinois, U.S.
- Education: University of Illinois Springfield; Eastern Illinois University
- Occupation: Author
- Writing career
- Genres: Science fiction, Speculative fiction
- Website: laurabynum.com

Laura Bynum (born February 28, 1968, in Springfield, Illinois) is an American author. Her first novel, Veracity, was published in January, 2010.

== Biography ==
Bynum graduated magna cum laude from the University of Illinois Springfield and Eastern Illinois University. She received an offer to publish Veracity at the same time she discovered that she had breast cancer. At the 2006 Maui Writers Conference, Bynum won the Rupert Hughes Literary Writing Award for Veracity (then unpublished).
