= Space, Love, & Bullfighting =

Studio album by Havalina
- Released: 2002
- Genre: Rock
- Length: 52:05
- Label: Tooth & Nail
- Producer: Matt Wignall

Havalina chronology
A Bullfighter's Guide to Space and Love (1999)	Space, Love, & Bullfighting (2002)	We Remember Anarchy (2006)

Professional ratings
Review scores
Source	Rating
Allmusic	link
HM	not rated

Space, Love, & Bullfighting is a studio album released by the American eclectic rock band Havalina in 2002.

== Track listing ==
1. "Space And Mexico" (2:44)
2. "Losing You" (4:36)
3. "Leica" (1:40)
4. "Pluto" (4:42)
5. "I Feel Nothing" (1:35)
6. "You Got Me Cry'n" (4:30)
7. "Rocket Ship" (3:01)
8. "Worst Days" (3:26)
9. "If You'd Like..." (5:02)
10. "Bullfighter" (4:27)
11. "Carlos" (4:43)
12. "Spaces And Places" (5:36)
13. "Space, Love And Bullfighting Suite" (6:03, in 5 parts):
  1. Powerful Mexi Radio (Wignall)
  2. That Bohemian Music (Maust)
  3. Untitled (Nieto)
  4. Space Cabana (Stevens)
  5. The Other World Is Present (Greenhill)

All songs written by Havalina.

== Credits ==
=== Havalina lineup ===
- Matt Wignall: Guitar, primary vocalist, reel, noise
- Orlando Greenhill: Bass guitar and double bass, noise, timpani
- David Maust: farfisa, Moog and hurdy gurdy
- Erick Nieto: drums, violin
- Mercedes Stevens: guitar, vocals, cello, castanets, shaker

=== Guest musicians ===
- Steve Hodges: marimba, clave, and other percussion on "Losing You", glockenspiel on "Leica", percussion on "Bullfighter", congas, shakers, and other percussion on "Carlos".
- Ivor Vejar: vocals on "You Got Me Cry'n" and "Powerful Mexi Radio"
- Curly Allsup: vocals on "You Got Me Cry'n"
- Mark Cole: bongos on "Worst Days"
- Matt Clatterbuck: Violin on "If You'd Like..." and "Bullfighter"
- Paul Justice: Trumpet on "Bullfighter"
- Kevin Laurence Barrans: Theremin on "Powerful Mexi Radio"
- Tim Stevens: guitar sounds and bird calls on "Space Cabana"

=== Other ===
- Recorded and produced at Tackyland LBC by Matt Wignall.
- All songs mixed by Matt Wignall, except "Space and Mexico", "Bullfighter", "You Got Me Cry'n", "Rocketship", and "Pluto" mixed by Anthony Arvisu.
- Mastered by Mike Mierau at Vision Mastering.
- Grady McFerrin - Cover illustration.
