= The Roxx Regime Demos =

Compilation album by Stryper
- Released: July 10, 2007
- Recorded: 1983
- Genre: Christian metal, glam metal
- Length: 28:39
- Label: Fifty Three Five

Stryper chronology
Extended Versions (2006)	The Roxx Regime Demos (2007)	Murder by Pride (2009)

The Roxx Regime Demos is the eleventh release and third compilation album by Stryper consisting of songs originally released under the band's previous name, Roxx Regime, except for the track "Honestly", which is taken from a later demo. While the album's general release was on July 10, 2007, pre-sale purchases at Stryper.com shipped on July 7, 2007, a reference to 777, a number that used to appear onstage at Stryper concerts.

== Critical reception ==
Professional ratings
Review scores
Source	Rating
AllMusic	2.5/5 stars
Piercing Metal	3.5/5 stars

Greg Prato of Allmusic said, "you hear a band that had pretty much found their sound early on". He compared the band favorably to other pop-metal bands of the time, but said the album was "aimed at die-hard die-hard Stryper fans". Ken Pierce of Piercing Metal said the songs "rock quite well and are a fun listen", but also stated that the release was for die-hard fans.

== Track listing ==
All songs were written by Michael Sweet, except where noted.

1. "From Wrong to Right" (Oz Fox, Robert Sweet, M. Sweet) – 4:00
2. "My Love I'll Always Show" (original rock version) – 3:28
3. "Loud N Clear" – 3:42
4. "You Know What to Do" (Fox, M. Sweet, R. Sweet, Tim Gaines) – 5:04
5. "You Won’t Be Lonely" – 3:55
6. "Co’mon Rock" – 3:42
7. "Tank" (Sweet, R.) (drum solo) – 0:43
8. "Honestly" (original demo version) – 4:05

20th Anniversary (of Stryper.com) vinyl edition contains three bonus tracks. The bonus tracks are on side two between "Tank" and "Honestly".

1. "My Love I'll Always Show" (alternate demo)
2. "Loud N Clear" (alternate demo)
3. "You Won't Be Lonely" (alternate demo)

== Personnel ==
Musicians

- Robert Sweet – drums
- Michael Sweet – vocals
- Oz Fox – guitar, backing vocals
- Tim Gaines – bass guitar
- Jon Van Togren – keyboards

Production

- Chaz (Charles) Ramirez – audio engineer
- Jeff Carroll – audio mastering
