= Extended Versions (Stryper album) =

Live album by Stryper
- Released: October 31, 2006
- Recorded: November 11, 2003
- Genre: Heavy metal, glam metal, Christian metal
- Label: Sony BMG

Stryper chronology
| Reborn (2005) | Extended Versions (2006) | The Roxx Regime Demos (2007) |

Professional ratings
Review scores
| Source | Rating |
|---|---|
| Allmusic | 3.5/5 stars |

Extended Versions is the tenth release and second live album released by Stryper, although it was recorded during the time that 7 Weeks: Live in America, 2003 was recorded.

== Track listing ==
1. "Makes Me Wanna Sing" (Sweet) 4:36
2. "Calling on You" (Sweet) 3:45
3. "Free" (Sweet, Sweet) 3:39
4. "More Than a Man" (Sweet) 4:34
5. "You Won't Be Lonely" (Sweet, Gaines) 4:24
6. "Reach Out" (Sweet, Sweet) 5:26
7. "The Way" (Fox) 3:50
8. "Soldiers Under Command" (Sweet, Sweet) 5:22
9. "To Hell with the Devil" (Sweet, Sweet) 5:57
10. "Honestly" (Sweet) 4:25
