= Havalina =

American rock band

- Origin: Long Beach, California
- Genre: Indie rock
- Years active: 1992–2005
- Labels: Tooth & Nail, Jackson/Rubio
- Past members: Matt Wignall; Jeff Suri; Grady McFerrin; Mark Cole; Orlando Greenhill; Daniel J. Brooker; Tatiana Simonian; Mercedes Stevens; David Maust; Erick Nieto

Havalina Rail Co. or just Havalina was a rock band from Long Beach, California. Many of Havalina's releases were regional concept albums.

According to the band's website, the band's name was inspired by the song "Havalina" by the Pixies. Havalina was active from 1992 through 2005. Havalina played their last show on March 17, 2005, at The Gypsy Lounge. Former members of Havalina are now involved in Matt Death and the New Intellectuals, Os and the Oculist, Starmob and Wargirl.

== History ==
The group was founded in Long Beach, California in 1992.

Havalina Rail Co. released their self-titled debut album through Tooth & Nail Records in 1994. The album contains 19 tracks of rockabilly, folk, swing and zydeco. This was the only album released by the band that wasn't a concept album. In an interview for KPSU, Wignall commented that the first album was "this sort of finding our path and gravitating towards American sounds."

Their second album, The Diamond in the Fish, released in 1996, was a concept album telling the story of a retired secret agent. The album was filled with Rat Pack-style jazz, filtered through folk and blues. About Diamond in the Fish, Wignall said, "We were experimenting with idea of like playing jazz, which incidentally, we kinda sucked at. And found out why most of the time all good jazz players are over fifty, 'cause it takes that long to get good at it."

The band independently released Russian Lullabies through Wignall's Jackson/Rubio label. This was the band's attempt to produce Eastern European music without actually listening to Eastern European music, then making a pop music sound from that. The album is long out of print, however, Wignall uploaded the album to the band's website for free download.

Wignall described America as "a musical road trip around America with the idea being to show our influences and what we like about American music while kinda re-defining the ideas if we had been there and done it our own way". The track "Let's Not Forget Hawaii" from this recording was featured on MTV's The Real World for the Hawaii season closer.

Space Love & Bullfighting (2002) was Havalina's final release with Tooth & Nail Records. This is the first album released under the name Havalina and not "Havalina Rail Co." Wignall described this album as songs about space, love, and bullfighting and various combinations of those themes. Song from this album were played on MTV's Sorority Life.

== Personnel ==
Though the lineup changed frequently, Matt Wignall and Orlando Greenhill were consistent members.

- Matt Wignall – guitar, banjo, primary vocals
- Orlando Greenhill – upright bass, bass guitar, vocals
- Jeff Suri – Drums, piano, vocals
- Grady McFerrin – trumpet, washboard
- Mark Cole – percussion, extra noises
- Daniel J. Brooker – accordion, piano
- Nathan Jensen – saxophone, vocals
- Lori Hoopes-Suri – percussion, vocals
- Tatiana Simonian – farfisa, vocals
- Mercedes Stevens/starry dynamo – vocals, guitar, cello
- David Maust – Farfisa, Moog synthesizer, Wurlitzer, organ, accordion, hurdy-gurdy
- Erick Nieto – drums, violin

== Discography ==
=== Studio albums ===
- Havalina Rail Co.
- The Diamond in the Fish
- Russian Lullabies
- America
- Space, Love, & Bullfighting
- We Remember Anarchy

=== Extended plays ===
- A Bullfighter's Guide to Space and Love

=== Compilations ===
- Sweet Family Music: A Tribute to Stryper (1996) - Contains "Always There for You"
- Surfonic Water Revival (1998) - Contains "The Sun Comes Down Again" (Taylor) – with Randy Stonehill
- Jackson/Rubio's Rockabilly Western Gospel Hymns - Contains "Train 13"

=== Other releases ===
- Havalina and the Creaky Old Bridge (Video)
