= Real (Michael Sweet album) =

Studio album by Michael Sweet
- Released: October 1995
- Genre: Christian rock
- Label: Benson Music Group
- Producer: Michael Sweet, Mike Slamer

Michael Sweet chronology
Michael Sweet (1994)	Real (1995)	Truth (1998)

Real is the second full-length solo album by Christian rock singer and Stryper frontman Michael Sweet, released in 1995 by Benson Music Group.

The album features a softer, mellower sound than the previous album. There's also an acoustic version of Stryper's hit "Always There for You".

Though it received less acclaim than its predecessor, the album achieved three No. 1 singles and received a Dove Award nomination.

A music video for the title track was released alongside it.

Professional ratings
Review scores
Source	Rating
AllMusic	

== Track listing ==
All songs written by Michael Sweet, except where noted.

1. "Color Blind" - 3:30
2. "Second Chance" - 4:10
3. "Ticket to Freedom" - 4:11
4. "The River" - 3:20
5. "Always There for You" - 4:09
6. "Real" - 5:11
7. "Baby Doll" - 4:19
8. "Why" - 4:22
9. "Remember Me" (Sweet, Doug Beiden) - 4:06
10. "Heaven Waits for You" - 3:10

== Personnel ==
- Michael Sweet - lead vocals, acoustic and electric guitars
- Mike Slamer - electric guitar, guitar solo on track 1
- Boba Elefante - bass guitar
- Jamie Wollam - drums
- John Andrew Schreiner - organ, piano, strings
- Waddy Wachtel - guitar solo on tracks 7–9
- Eric Darken - percussion
- Micah Wilshire, Angelo Petrucci - additional backing vocals
