= I'm Not Your Suicide =

Studio album by Michael Sweet
- Released: May 6, 2014
- Genre: Christian rock, Christian metal, hard rock
- Length: 49:52
- Label: Big3
- Producer: Michael Sweet

Michael Sweet chronology
| Touched (2007) | I'm Not Your Suicide (2014) | Only to Rise (2015) |

I'm Not Your Suicide is the sixth studio album from the Christian music musician and Stryper frontman Michael Sweet, who helmed the production on the album. The album released on May 6, 2014, by Big3 Records. This album charted at No. 154 on the Billboard 200 and it was awarded a five star rating by CCM Magazine and a four star rating from HM.

The music video for "I'm Not Your Suicide" supports the Childhelp foundation. The "Heart of Gold" video features Electra Mustaine, the daughter of Megadeth frontman Dave Mustaine.

== Critical reception ==
Professional ratings
Review scores
| Source | Rating |
|---|---|
| About.com | 4/5 stars |
| AllMusic | 3/5 stars |
| CCM Magazine | 5/5 stars |
| Christian Music Review | 4.2/5 |
| The Christian Music Review Blog | 4/5 stars |
| The Front Row Report | 10/10 stars |
| HM | 4/5 stars |
| Indie Vision Music | 3/5 stars |
| Jesus Freak Hideout | 3.5/5 stars |
| The Phantom Tollbooth | 4/5 stars |

I'm Not Your Suicide garnered praise from the ratings and reviews of music critics. At CCM Magazine, Andy Argyrakis rated the album a perfect five stars, stating that the release "is a full-fledged foray into Sweet's songwriting soul, alongside sky-high vocals that only seem to improve with age" on "this modern-day melodic rock masterpiece". Jeff McCormack of HM rated the album four stars out of five, writing that "All in all, this is a great, well-rounded release that fans of both Stryper and Sweet’s past releases should love." At AllMusic, Mark Deming rated the album three stars out of five, calling this "a set of the powerful and deeply personal melodic hard rock that's long been his musical trademark."

At Jesus Freak Hideout, Bert Gangl rated the album three-and-a-half stars out of five, saying that "To be sure, even though I'm Not Your Suicide is neither his strongest band-based or solo effort, it may well prove to be his most interesting." Chad Bowar of About.com rated the album four stars out of five, stating that this release continues the great work begun on No More Hell to Pay. At Indie Vision Music, Lee Brown rated the album three stars out of five, cautioning that "As the musical portion of that one-two punch, this album has high musical quality that fans of Sweet's previous works will enjoy, though casual listeners may be tempted to dismiss."

At The Phantom Tollbooth, Bert Saraco rated the album four tocks out of five, writing how "some new colors are added to an already sweet palette." Jay Heilman of Christian Music Review rated the album 4.2 out of five, saying it is a "great record" that has "a little bit of something for everyone." At The Front Row Report, Reggie Edwards rated the album a perfect ten stars, stating "I'm Not Your Suicide is the most musically diverse record Michael Sweet has ever recorded and released" that "showcase[s] [h]is overall musical talent and it has never shown through clearer than on I'm Not Your Suicide." Jim Wilkerson of The Christian Music Review Blog rated the album four stars out of five, writing that the release "is really great work for the genre."

== Commercial performance ==
For the Billboard charting week of May 24, 2014, I'm Not Your Suicide was the No. 154 most sold album in the entirety of the United States via the Billboard 200, and it was the No. 14 most sold of the Christian Albums. Also, the album was the No. 40 most sold album of the Rock Albums, and it was the No. 10 most sold of the Hard Rock Albums. Lastly, the album was the No. 29 most sold of the Independent Albums.

== Track listing ==
| No. | Title | Length |
|---|---|---|
| 1. | "Taking on the World Tonight" (featuring Tony Harnell) | 3:43 |
| 2. | "All That's Left (For Me to Prove)" | 3:47 |
| 3. | "The Cause" | 4:09 |
| 4. | "This Time" (featuring Kevin Max) | 4:10 |
| 5. | "I'm Not Your Suicide" | 3:52 |
| 6. | "Coming Home" | 3:58 |
| 7. | "Miles Away" | 3:32 |
| 8. | "Strong" | 3:59 |
| 9. | "How to Live" (featuring Robert Sweet and Timothy Gaines) | 4:13 |
| 10. | "Heart of Gold" | 3:10 |
| 11. | "Anybody Else" (featuring Chris Jericho and Doug Aldrich) | 4:02 |
| 12. | "Unsuspecting" | 4:08 |
| 13. | "Heart of Gold" (featuring Electra Mustaine) | 3:09 |
| Total length: | | 49:52 |

== Personnel ==
- Michael Sweet - lead vocals, lead guitar
- Kenny Aronoff - drums
- John O'Boyle - bass
- Paul McNamara - piano, B3, Moog, keyboards
- Pete Adams - steel guitar

Guest musicians

- Robert Sweet - drums on "How to Live"
- Tim Gaines - bass on "How to Live"
- Tony Harnell - guest vocal on "Taking on the World Tonight"
- Kevin Max - guest vocal on "This Time"
- Electra Mustaine - guest vocal on "Heart of Gold"
- Chris Jericho - guest vocal on "Anybody Else"
- Doug Aldrich - lead guitar solo on "Anybody Else"

== Chart performance ==
| Chart (2014) | Peak position |
|---|---|
| US Billboard 200 | 154 |
| US Top Christian Albums (Billboard) | 14 |
| US Top Hard Rock Albums (Billboard) | 10 |
| US Independent Albums (Billboard) | 29 |
| US Top Rock Albums (Billboard) | 40 |
