= Unified (Sweet & Lynch album) =

Studio album by Sweet & Lynch
- Released: November 10, 2017
- Recorded: 2017
- Genre: Christian metal, Christian rock, hard rock
- Length: 50:18
- Label: Frontiers
- Producer: Michael Sweet

Sweet & Lynch chronology
| Only to Rise (2015) | Unified (2017) | Heart & Sacrifice (2023) |

Michael Sweet chronology
| One Sided War (2016) | Unified (2017) |

George Lynch chronology
| Shadow Train (2015) | Unified (2017) | Heart & Sacrifice (2023) |

Unified is the second studio album by the duo Sweet & Lynch. Frontiers Records released the album on November 10, 2017.

== Reception ==
Professional ratings
Review scores
| Source | Rating |
|---|---|
| Jesus Freak Hideout | 4.5/5 stars |
| Rock 'N' Load | 9/10 stars |
| Myglobalmind | 10/10 stars |

Bert Gangl, indicating in a four and a half star review at Jesus Freak Hideout, recognizes, "begins and ends with Sweet's trademark powerful and piercing wail, while Lynch fills everything in between with a hefty slab of his characteristically blistering rhythm and lead runs. In a ten out of ten review, Myglobalmind's Marianne “Den Mother” Jacobsen, responds, "As you trek through the album the variations of style and true musicianship show over and over again. Proving what nerdy me already knew – Leave the rock and roll to the grown-ups kids." Signaling in a nine out of ten review from Rock 'N' Load, #Flashartmark replies, "Sweet & Lynch deliver another album that is full of melodic riffs and heavy beats. The album holds a heavier feel compared to most released by Frontiers, but is full of great tracks nonetheless. George Lynch’s guitar work is unmistakable throughout and is perfectly complemented by Sweet’s own playing."

== Track listing ==
All tracks are written by Michael Sweet & George Lynch.

| No. | Title | Length |
|---|---|---|
| 1. | "Promised Land" | 4:15 |
| 2. | "Walk" | 5:39 |
| 3. | "Afterlife" | 5:08 |
| 4. | "Make Your Mark" | 4:06 |
| 5. | "Tried & True" | 4:15 |
| 6. | "Unified" | 4:29 |
| 7. | "Find Your Way" | 4:24 |
| 8. | "Heart Of Fire" | 4:16 |
| 9. | "Bridge Of Broken Lies" | 4:40 |
| 10. | "Better Man" | 5:04 |
| 11. | "Live To Die" | 4:19 |
| Total length: | | 50:18 |

== Personnel ==
- Michael Sweet - lead vocals, guitars
- George Lynch - lead guitars
- James LoMenzo - bass guitar
- Brian Tichy - drums
