= Even the Devil Believes =

Studio album by Stryper
- Released: September 4, 2020
- Genre: Christian metal
- Length: 46:27
- Label: Frontiers
- Producer: Michael Sweet

Stryper chronology
God Damn Evil (2018)	Even the Devil Believes (2020)	The Final Battle (2022)

Singles from Even the Devil Believes
- 1. "Do Unto Others" Released: 2020; 2. "Blood from Above" Released: 2020; 3. "Divider" Released: 2020

Even the Devil Believes is the eighteenth release and thirteenth studio album by Christian metal band Stryper, produced by frontman Michael Sweet and released on September 4, 2020. The album is also the first with bassist Perry Richardson.

It was the first Stryper album to reach number one on the Billboard Top Christian Albums chart.

== Critical reception ==
Professional ratings
Review scores
Source	Rating
HM Magazine	4/5 stars
Jesus Freak Hideout	4/5 stars
Metal Music Archives	3/5 stars
Metal Temple	8/10
Sonic Perspectives	7.8/10

== Track listing ==
Even the Devil Believes track listing
No.	Title	Length
1.	"Blood from Above"	3:21
2.	"Make Love Great Again"	5:53
3.	"Let Him In"	3:52
4.	"Do Unto Others"	4:39
5.	"Even the Devil Believes"	4:35
6.	"How to Fly"	4:09
7.	"Divider"	3:30
8.	"This I Pray"	4:29
9.	"Invitation Only"	3:32
10.	"For God & Rock n' Roll"	4:06
11.	"Middle Finger Messiah"	4:21
Total length:		46:27

== Personnel ==
Stryper

- Michael Sweet – lead vocals, lead guitars
- Robert Sweet – drums, backing vocals
- Oz Fox – lead guitars, backing vocals
- Perry Richardson – bass guitar, backing vocals

== Charts ==
Chart (2020)	Peak position
Belgian Albums (Ultratop Wallonia)	97
German Albums (Offizielle Top 100)	92
Spanish Albums (Promusicae)	57
Swiss Albums (Schweizer Hitparade)	36
UK Independent Albums (Official Charts)	48
UK Rock & Metal Albums (Official Charts)	12
US Billboard 200	92
US Top Christian Albums (Billboard)	1
US Independent Albums (Billboard)	15
US Top Album Sales (Billboard)	6
US Top Hard Rock Albums (Billboard)	4
US Top Rock Albums (Billboard)	11
