= Touched (Michael Sweet album) =

Studio album by Michael Sweet
- Released: 2007
- Genre: Easy listening
- Producer: Michael Sweet

Michael Sweet chronology
Him (2006)	Touched (2007)	I'm Not Your Suicide (2014)

Touched is a Michael Sweet solo album self-released in 2007. Unlike most of Sweet's previous albums, the album is influenced by classical sound (rather than his usual rock or metal sound). The album is dedicated to his wife, Kyle, who was suffering from stage-four ovarian cancer.

Touched has a collection of five cover songs originally performed by iconic artists, including Billy Preston, Billy Joel, Badfinger, Peggy Seeger, Amanda McBroom, and Chicago, as well as classical versions of four Stryper ballads, and an all-original song, "My Love, My Life, My Flame".

== Track listing ==
1. "You Are So Beautiful" (Billy Preston) - 2:50
2. "Together as One" (Michael Sweet) - 4:45
3. "She's Got a Way" (Billy Joel) - 2:55
4. "All of Me" (Michael Sweet) - 3:14
5. "Without You" (William Peter Ham, Tom Evans) - 3:33
6. "First Love" (Michael Sweet) - 4:20
7. "The First Time Ever I Saw Your Face" (Ewan MacColl) 4:43
8. "Honestly" (Michael Sweet) 4:14
9. "The Rose" (Amanda McBroom) 3:48
10. "My Love, My Life, My Flame" (Michael Sweet) 4:09
11. "Color My World" (James Pankow) 2:58

== Personnel ==
- Michael Sweet - lead vocals
- Peter Vantine - piano, orchestration
