= Michael Sweet (album) =

Studio album by Michael Sweet
- Released: April 7, 1994
- Genre: Christian rock, hard rock
- Label: Benson
- Producer: Michael Sweet, Gregg Fulkerson

Michael Sweet chronology
Unstryped (1992)	Michael Sweet (1994)	Real (1995)

Professional ratings
Review scores
Source	Rating
AllMusic	(not rated, no review)

Michael Sweet is the first full-length solo album of Christian rock singer, and Stryper frontman, Michael Sweet. The album was released in 1994 by Benson Music Group.

The album features Gregg Fulkerson (previously with band Blue Tears) as a co-producer, songwriter, musician, and backing singer.

The album received high praise from critics as well as five No. 1 singles.

Three music videos for "All This and Heaven Too", "Someday", and "Ain't No Safe Way", were released following the album.

== Track listing ==
All songs written by Michael Sweet, except where noted:

1. "Together" (Sweet, Fulkerson) – 4:10
2. "Take Me Home" – 4:41
3. "Tomorrow, Tonight" – 4:36
4. "All This and Heaven Too" (Sweet, Fulkerson) – 4:07
5. "Someday" – 4:53
6. "J.E.S.U.S." – 4:27
7. "All I Wanna Do (Is Love You)" – 4:05
8. "Forever Yours" (Fulkerson) – 4:24
9. "I Think You Hear Me Knockin'" – 3:56
10. "Ain't No Safe Way" (Sweet, Fulkerson) – 3:15

== Personnel ==
- Michael Sweet – lead vocals, rhythm guitar, lead guitar
- Gregg Fulkerson – rhythm guitar, organ, keyboards, background vocals, lead guitar solo on track 4
- Jamie Wollam – drums, percussion
- Michael Spears – bass guitar
- Doug Beiden – background vocals, additional organ and keyboards
- Steve Grove – saxophone on track 3
- J.R. McNeely – additional bass guitar on track 9
- Taylor Wells & Brian Ruvalcava – shouts, screams, and yells in track 6
- Carolee Fulkerson – background vocals on tracks 4 and 8
