= Veracity =

Veracity may refer to:

- Honesty, an ethical principle
- Truth, a property of beliefs
- Veracity (album), 2008, by Evacuate Chicago
- Veracity (novel), 2010, by Laura Bynum
- Veracity, an early motorcar line by the Smith Automobile Company
