= The Final Battle (album) =

Studio album by Stryper
- Released: October 21, 2022
- Genres: Christian metal; heavy metal; hard rock
- Length: 46:22
- Label: Frontiers
- Producer: Michael Sweet

Stryper chronology
Even the Devil Believes (2020)	The Final Battle (2022)	When We Were Kings (2024)

Singles from The Final Battle
- 1. "Rise To The Call" Released: 2022; 2. "See No Evil, Hear No Evil" Released: 2022; 3. "Transgressor" Released: 2022; 4. "Same Old Story" Released: 2022; 5. "Ashes to Ashes" Released: 2022; 6. "Near" Released: 2022

The Final Battle is the nineteenth release and fourteenth studio album by Christian metal band Stryper, produced by frontman Michael Sweet and released on October 21, 2022.

== Critical reception ==
Professional ratings
Review scores
Source	Rating
Jesus Freak Hideout	3.5/5 stars
Metal Injection	9/10
Metal Force Magazine	8.5/10
Metal Temple	10/10
My Global Mind	9/10

== Track listing ==
The Final Battle track listing
No.	Title	Length
1.	"Trangressor"	4:25
2.	"See No Evil, Hear No Evil"	4:54
3.	"Same Old Story"	4:09
4.	"Heart & Soul"	4:00
5.	"Near"	4:53
6.	"Out, Up & In"	4:12
7.	"Rise To The Call"	3:47
8.	"The Way, the Truth, the Life"	3:54
9.	"No Rest for the Wicked"	4:21
10.	"Till Death Do Us Part"	3:54
11.	"Ashes to Ashes"	3:53
Total length:		46:22

== Personnel ==
Stryper

- Michael Sweet – lead vocals, lead guitars
- Robert Sweet – drums, backing vocals
- Oz Fox – lead guitars, backing vocals
- Perry Richardson – bass guitar, backing vocals

Additional personnel

- Charles Foley – backing vocals
- Keith Pittman – backing vocals
- Paul McNamara – organ, synthesizer (Moog), keys

== Charts ==
Chart (2022)	Peak position
Swiss Albums (Schweizer Hitparade)	24
US Top Christian Albums (Billboard)	3
US Independent Albums (Billboard)	33
US Top Album Sales (Billboard)	13
US Top Hard Rock Albums (Billboard)	11
