= Soldiers Under Command =

Studio album by Stryper
- Released: August 23, 1985
- Studios: Amigo Studios (Los Angeles, California); Smoketree Ranch (Chatsworth, California)
- Genres: Christian metal; heavy metal
- Length: 45:02
- Label: Enigma
- Producer: Michael Wagener

Stryper chronology
The Yellow & Black Attack! (1984)	Soldiers Under Command (1985)	To Hell with the Devil (1986)

Singles from Soldiers Under Command
- 1. "Soldiers Under Command" Released: 1985; 2. "Together as One" Released: 1985; 3. "Reach Out" Released: 1985

Professional ratings
Review scores
Source	Rating
AllMusic	3/5 stars
Kerrang!	3.5/5 stars
Jesus Freak Hideout	4/5 stars

Soldiers Under Command is the second release, and first full-length studio album from Christian metal band Stryper, released on August 23, 1985. It was the first Christian metal album to achieve Gold record status, selling more than half a million copies. The album was originally issued on white vinyl. The Live in Japan in-concert video, released in 1986, was filmed on July 8, 1985, during Stryper's tour in support of this album.

A music video of the title track was released.

The inspirational verse for this album is 2 Timothy 2:3–4.

The album's commercial performance directly influenced the recording of Stryper's follow-up, To Hell with the Devil. By January 1987, Soldiers Under Command had surpassed 400,000 in sales, leading Enigma Records to provide the band with greater resources for their next record. Robert Sweet noted the resulting pressure: "Everybody was really expecting something good after 'Soldiers.'"

== Track listing ==
All songs written by Michael Sweet, except where noted.

1. "Soldiers Under Command" (Michael Sweet, Robert Sweet) – 5:03
2. "Makes Me Wanna Sing" – 2:51
3. "Together Forever" – 4:03
4. "First Love" – 5:43
5. "The Rock That Makes Me Roll" – 4:56
6. "Reach Out" (M. Sweet, R. Sweet) – 5:21
7. "(Waiting for) A Love That's Real" – 4:36
8. "Together as One" – 5:01
9. "Surrender" – 4:28
10. "Battle Hymn of the Republic" (Julia Ward Howe) – 2:36

== Personnel ==
Stryper

- Michael Sweet – lead vocals, backing vocals, lead and rhythm guitars, guitar solos (on tracks 4–7)
- Oz Fox – lead and rhythm guitars, guitar solos (on tracks 2–6, 9), backing vocals
- Tim Gaines – keyboards and bass (1–7, 9, 10), backing vocals (8)
- Robert Sweet – drums

Additional musicians

- John Van Tongeren – keyboards, acoustic piano and bass (8)
- Christopher Currell – Synclavier programming (10)
- Doris Castenada – backing vocals (10)
- Linda Mullen – backing vocals (10)
- Tammy Thomas – backing vocals (10)

== Production ==
- Michael Wagener – producer, engineer, mixing
- Bryan Ayuso – album design
- John Scarpati – photography
- Anne Revenge – additional photography

== Charts ==
Chart (1985)	Peak position
Japanese Albums (Oricon)	78
US Billboard 200	84
US Top Christian Albums (Billboard)	5

== Certifications ==
Region	Certification	Certified units/sales
United States (RIAA)	Gold	500,000^{^}
^{^} Shipments figures based on certification alone.
