= The Yellow and Black Attack =

EP by Stryper
- Released: July 1984
- Studios: Music Grinder Studios (Los Angeles); MadDog Studios (Los Angeles)
- Genres: Heavy metal, Christian metal, glam metal
- Length: 23:56
- Label: Enigma
- Producers: Ron Goudie, Stryper

Stryper chronology
The Yellow and Black Attack (1984)	Soldiers Under Command (1985)

Singles from The Yellow and Black Attack
- 1. "Reason for the Season" / "Winter Wonderland" Released: 1984

Professional ratings
Review scores
Source	Rating
AllMusic	2/5 stars

The Yellow and Black Attack is the debut EP by the American Christian metal band Stryper. It was originally released in 1984 as a six-song EP, and fewer than 20,000 copies were pressed, as their label, Enigma Records, was unsure of the potential market for Christian metal. CCM Magazine was slightly critical of the EP, citing production quality and the short length of the release, but commented that "Stryper has the promise of a major success story." Enigma Records' Wes Hein later recalled that even before the EP's release, the label was receiving calls from Christian communities looking to purchase copies in bulk for distribution at churches: "When it's out, I want to buy a box... We're going to give them out at our church."

According to Michael Sweet's autobiography, the album was re-recorded and released as an official album, after their first manager, Daryn Hinton, loaned them $100,000 to re-produce the record. The album initially sold 150,000 units in the first three weeks.

After Stryper achieved major success with their second release and first full-length album, Soldiers Under Command, The Yellow and Black Attack EP was reissued. Re-released on August 10, 1986, with two additional songs, "Reason for the Season" (which was originally released on a 1985 Christmas-themed 12" single with "Winter Wonderland") and a new, mellowed-down version of "My Love I'll Always Show", which dates from their Roxx Regime days.

The debut recording was reported by Enigma in 1987 as "label's best seller to date, outdistancing stiff competition from early Mötley Crüe, Ratt and Berlin".

On the album's 42nd anniversary in 2026, Sweet reflected: "This album was the one that started it all. It's raw and unrefined, yet without it, we wouldn't be here," adding: "Love it or hate it, this is the album that started it all. Not Soldiers, not To Hell With The Devil, not In God We Trust."

== Track listing (1984 EP) ==
1. "Loud 'N' Clear" (Michael Sweet) – 3:34
2. "From Wrong to Right" (M. Sweet, Robert Sweet, Oz Fox) – 3:51
3. "You Know What to Do" (M. Sweet, R. Sweet, Fox, Tim Gaines) – 4:47
4. "Co'mon Rock" (M. Sweet) – 3:46
5. "You Won't Be Lonely" (M. Sweet) – 3:43
6. "Loving You" (M. Sweet) – 4:15

== Track listing (1986 re-release) ==
1. "Loud 'N' Clear" (Michael Sweet) – 3:34
2. "From Wrong to Right" (M. Sweet, Robert Sweet, Oz Fox) – 3:51
3. "My Love I'll Always Show " (M. Sweet) – 3:38
4. "You Know What to Do" (M. Sweet, R. Sweet, Fox, Tim Gaines) – 4:47
5. "Co'mon Rock" (M. Sweet) – 3:46
6. "You Won't Be Lonely" (M. Sweet) – 3:43
7. "Loving You" (M. Sweet) – 4:15
8. "Reason for the Season" (M. Sweet, R. Sweet) – 6:30
9. "Winter Wonderland" (Japan bonus track) - 3:16

== Personnel ==
Stryper

- Michael Sweet – lead vocals, guitars
- Tim Gaines – keyboards, bass, backing vocals
- Oz Fox – lead guitars, backing vocals
- Robert Sweet – drums

Additional musicians

- Christopher Currell – Synclavier programming

=== Production ===
- Stryper – producers
- Ron Goudie – producer (1–7)
- Jim Faraci – mixing
- Eddy Schreyer – mastering at Capitol Mastering (Hollywood, California)
- Brian Ayuso – art direction, design
- Tom Utley – cover illustration
- Glen La Ferman – photography

== Charts ==
Chart (1984–1986)	Peak position
Japanese Albums (Oricon)	61
US Billboard 200	103
US Top Christian Albums (Billboard)	10
