= Second Coming (Stryper album) =

Studio album by Stryper
- Released: March 26, 2013
- Recorded: 2012
- Genres: Christian metal, heavy metal
- Label: Frontiers
- Producer: Michael Sweet

Stryper chronology
The Covering (2011)	Second Coming (2013)	No More Hell to Pay (2013)

Singles from Second Coming
- 1. "Bleeding from Inside Out" Released: 2013

Professional ratings
Review scores
Source	Rating
AllMusic	3.5/5 stars

Second Coming is the fourteenth release and ninth studio album by American Christian heavy metal/hard rock band Stryper. The album features re-recorded versions of earlier material as well as two new songs.

== Track listing ==
No.	Title	Length
1.	"Loud 'n' Clear"	3:46
2.	"Loving You"	4:27
3.	"Soldiers Under Command"	5:08
4.	"Makes Me Wanna Sing"	2:50
5.	"First Love"	5:22
6.	"The Rock That Makes Me Roll"	4:53
7.	"Reach Out"	5:24
8.	"Surrender"	4:18
9.	"To Hell with the Devil"	4:06
10.	"Calling on You"	3:41
11.	"Free"	3:41
12.	"The Way"	3:37
13.	"Sing Along Song"	4:23
14.	"More Than a Man"	4:33
15.	"Bleeding from Inside Out"	3:44
16.	"Blackened"	3:08

Japanese edition bonus track
No.	Title	Length
17.	"Together as One"	4:45

== Personnel ==
Stryper

- Michael Sweet – lead and backing vocals, lead and rhythm guitars, guitar solo (1–3, 5–11, 15, 16)
- Oz Fox – lead and rhythm guitars, guitar solo (1, 3–9, 12, 14), backing vocals
- Tim Gaines – bass, backing vocals
- Robert Sweet – drums, percussion

Additional musicians

- Charles Foley – keyboards, backing vocals
- Paul McNamara – acoustic piano, keyboards

== Production ==
- Michael Sweet – producer
- Danny Bernini – engineer, mixing, mastering
- Kenny Lewis – additional recording, editing
- Stan-W Decker – artwork, layout
- Tina Enos – photography
- Marylin Becrelis – additional photography

== Charts ==
Chart (2013)	Peak position
US Billboard 200	117
US Top Christian Albums (Billboard)	11
US Independent Albums (Billboard)	25
US Top Hard Rock Albums (Billboard)	9
US Top Rock Albums (Billboard)	35
