= Veracity (novel) =

2010 novel by Laura Bynum

- Cover of first edition (hardcover)
- Author: Laura Bynum
- Language: English
- Genre: novel, literature, speculative fiction
- Publisher: Simon & Schuster's Pocket
- Publication date: 2010 (Hardcover)
- Publication place: United States
- Media type: Print (Hardcover)
- Pages: 384
- ISBN: 978-1-4391-2334-8

Veracity is a 2010 speculative fiction novel written by American author Laura Bynum.

== Plot summary ==
Veracity takes place in 2045. Harper Abigail Adams, a psychic, works for a totalitarian government called The Confederation of the Willing. In 2012, when she was six years old, a fake vaccine, distributed during what the soon-to-be Confederation claimed to be a pandemic, killed half the country's population. The regime that arose in the wake of the attack controlled the remaining population with a brutal police force called the Blue Coats, government-sanctioned drugs and prostitution, and language restriction. Citizens are required to have a prosthetic device, called a "slate," installed in their necks. The slate monitors citizens' geographic location and activities, as well as the words they speak. The Confederation maintains a list of "red-listed" words, including "America" and "revolution." Speaking one of them triggers an electric shock by the device and summons the police for an offense punishable by torture, rape, or death. Government monitors are chosen for their psychic powers allowing them to read "auras," and Harper is particularly skilled at this.

Harper is already disillusioned, but when her daughter's name, Veracity, ends up on the "red list," she flees to an underground bunker in the countryside to join the resistance and impending war against the government. The resistance is led by Lazarus Cole, a co-inventor of the slate, and consists of people who either never installed a slate or who undergo a painful process to disable the implant permanently. They are guided by a copy of the rare Book of Noah, a mythical text whose existence is denied by the Confederacy. The book—actually a copy of Webster's Dictionary—is said to contain the answers to every question in existence.

Other characters include John Gage, a spy in the Blue Coat force who recruits Harper; Ezra James, a prostitute who trains Harper for combat; and Jingo, a Blue Coat and client of Ezra's who attempts to track down Harper and the bunker.

== Critical reception ==
Veracity received mixed reviews. The New York Journal of Books compared the book favorably to George Orwell's Nineteen Eighty-Four. Publishers Weekly, though calling the book and its characterization "emotionally gripping," criticized Bynum's "occasionally incoherent" plot. The A.V. Club panned the novel as "a weak attempt to update an old genre," criticizing its imagined political future as implausible and its characters as "vanilla, with very little depth."

== Themes ==
Veracity is a dystopian novel concerned with themes of censorship and freedom of thought. Critics have drawn parallels to political developments such as the Patriot Act and online surveillance by the National Security Administration and the Chinese government.

The novel contains extensive flashbacks, which Ritch Calvin of SUNY Stony Brook argues work with the themes of language and censorship to reinforce a sense of epistemological doubt.
