= Truth (2000 Michael Sweet album) =

Studio album by Michael Sweet
- Released: July 15, 2000
- Genre: Christian rock
- Label: Restless Records
- Producer: Bob Marlette, Michael Sweet

Michael Sweet chronology
Truth (1998)	Truth (2000)	Him (2006)

Released by Christian rock singer and Stryper frontman, Michael Sweet, in 2000, Truth is the official full-length Restless Records version of the demo album of the same name Sweet independently released two years earlier (1998).

The 1998 demo album sold independently through Sweet's website and did very well selling 25,000 units. This prompted several labels to seek rights to release the album.

The 2000 official album features eight of the ten songs included in the 1998 demo (songs "One" and "Rain" are not included), presented with new arrangements and a more polished sound and mix. It additionally features four new songs ("All I'm Thinking Of (Is You)", "Save Me", "Ever After", and "Tomorrow") and new album artwork.

Sweet's Stryper bandmate, Oz Fox, features on the song "The Ever After" performing a guitar solo.

Professional ratings
Review scores
Source	Rating
AllMusic	2.5/5 stars
HM Magazine	

== Track listing ==
All tracks are written by Michael Sweet.

No.	Title	Length
1.	"Distracted"	5:24
2.	"All I'm Thinking Of (Is You)"	4:40
3.	"I Am Adam"	4:32
4.	"Blue Bleeds Through"	4:46
5.	"Wool & Chiffon"	4:56
6.	"Save Me"	4:41
7.	"The Ever After"	4:07
8.	"Tomorrow"	3:41
9.	"Lift My Head"	4:39
10.	"Truth"	4:42
11.	"Achilles Heel"	3:53
12.	"Stone"	4:58
Total length:		54:59

== Personnel ==
- Michael Sweet - lead vocals, guitars
- Chris Miles - bass guitar
- Kenny Aronoff - drums, percussion
- Bob Marlette - keyboards, organ, piano, strings, mellotron
- Oz Fox - guitar solo on track 7
- Tim Pierce - guitar solo on track 1, slide on track 6
- Suzy Katayama - orchestration on track 4
- Peter Vantine - piano, orchestration on track 12
- Steve Hunt - additional strings on track 9

== Production crew ==
- Produced by Bob Marlette and Michael Sweet
- Engineered and mixed by Bob Marlette
- Recorded at Sound Techniques, Boston; The Blue Room and A&M Studios, Los Angeles
