= Russian Lullabies =

Studio album by Havalina
- Released: 1997
- Recorded: Tackyland LBC, 1997
- Length: 55:30
- Label: Jackson Rubio

Havalina chronology
The Diamond in the Fish (1996)	Russian Lullabies (1997)	America (1999)

Professional ratings
Review scores
Source	Rating
Exit Zine	4.5/5

Russian Lullabies is an album by Havalina Rail Co. released on band member Matt Wignall's own record label Jackson Rubio. The album is out of print.

== Track listing ==
1. "Tundra" – 3:46
2. "Kaliningrad" – 2:35
3. "Twilight Time" – 4:36
4. "Siberian Safari" – 2:53
5. "Red and Blue (In St. Petersburgh)" – 5:51
6. "Traffic in Moscow" – 1:04
7. "Changes and Forms" – 4:33
8. "The Lovesick Blues of a Young Soviet Proletariat" – 2:19
9. "Before Ararat" – 2:17
10. "Winter" – 1:58
11. "Total Depravity" – 4:44
12. "The Sensual Song" – 4:53
13. "Nathan's Song" – 2:04
14. "Russian Lullaby" – 4:49
15. "Rivers of Russia" – 7:08
