= What is truth =

What is truth may refer to:

- John 18:38, a verse from the Bible, also known as "What is truth?"
- Edi Nijam, a 1965 Telugu film whose English title is What is Truth
- "What Is Truth", a 1970 single by Johnny Cash
- What is Truth?, a 1976 book by philosopher C. J. F. Williams

== See also ==
- Truth
- Religious views on truth
