= Reborn (Stryper album) =

Studio album by Stryper
- Released: August 16, 2005
- Recorded: Blue Jay Studio, MA, U.S.
- Genres: Christian metal, nu metal
- Length: 39:47
- Label: Big 3
- Producers: Michael Sweet, Kenny Lewis

Stryper chronology
7 Weeks: Live in America, 2003 (2004)	Reborn (2005)	Extended Versions (2006)

Singles from Reborn
- 1. "Make You Mine" Released: 2005; 2. "Reborn" Released: 2005

Professional ratings
Review scores
Source	Rating
AllMusic	3.5/5 stars
Cross Rhythms	9/10 stars
Jesus Freak Hideout	3.5/5 stars

Reborn is the sixth album from the Christian metal band Stryper, and the first full-length album of new material since Against the Law in 1990. Reborn was slated to be a Michael Sweet solo record, but after their reunion tour, Sweet played it for the other members, at which time Oz Fox suggested it should be a Stryper record. So the other members came in and learned their parts from the original demos. Sweet says in his autobiography, Honestly: My Life and Stryper Revealed, that he convinced Big3 Records, which had signed him for a solo release, to make it a Stryper record deal. Thus, Reborn became the first all-original Stryper record in 15 years.

The sound of the album is more contemporary compared to their previous records. It is also heavier and has influences of nu metal. The sound has been cited as more mature than their previous material, "less glam and more filling", according to one reviewer. This is the first album recorded by the band with new bass guitar player Tracy Ferrie. Reborn was released with a variety of cover art, depending on format and region. The alternate US cover art was created for record outlets (such as Christian bookstores) where the original cover art may have been perceived as too disturbing or offensive.

== Track listing ==
All tracks written by Michael Sweet, except where noted.

1. "Open Your Eyes" - 4:02
2. "Reborn" - 3:27
3. "When Did I See You Cry" (M. Sweet, David Johnson) - 3:35
4. "Make You Mine" - 4:01
5. "Passion" - 3:48
6. "Live Again" - 3:30
7. "If I Die" - 3:22
8. "Wait for You" - 3:43
9. "Rain" (Paul Heusman, M. Sweet) - 3:45
10. "10,000 Years" (Public domain, M. Sweet) - 3:15
11. "I.G.W.T." (M. Sweet, Robert Sweet) - 3:17

Japanese edition bonus tracks
No.	Title	Length
12.	"More Than a Man" (Live)
13.	"Reach Out" (Live)

"I.G.W.T." is a remake of the band's previous song "In God We Trust" from the album of the same name.

== Personnel ==
Stryper

- Michael Sweet – lead vocals, guitars, arrangements
- Oz Fox – guitars, backing vocals
- Tracy Ferrie – bass, backing vocals
- Robert Sweet – drums

Additional musicians

- Kenny Lewis – keyboards, programming, loops
- Peter Vantine – keyboards, programming, orchestrations
- Lou Spagnola – bass (2, 5, 10)
- Derek Kerswill – drums, drum loops
- Alan Magnus – additional backing vocals

== Production ==
- Bill Edwards – executive producer
- Michael Sweet – producer, arrangements, mixing, tracking
- Kenny Lewis – producer, mixing, tracking, Pro Tools engineer
- Will Sandals – tracking
- Peter Vantine – tracking
- Ted Jensen – mastering
- Doug Circle – art direction
- Richie "Britley" Hughes – art direction
- Stephen Stickler – photography
- Deep South Entertainment – management

Studios

- Recorded at Blue Jay Studios (Carlisle, Massachusetts); Mixed Emotions (Middleton, Massachusetts); Vantine Studios (Stoneham, Massachusetts).
- Pro Tools engineering at MSP Studios (Bourne, Massachusetts).
- Mixed at Mixed Emotions
- Mastered at Sterling Sound (New York City, New York).

== Charts ==
Chart (2005)	Peak position
Japanese Albums (Oricon)	193
US Billboard 200	111
US Top Christian Albums (Billboard)	4
