= 7 Weeks: Live in America, 2003 =

Live album by Stryper
- Released: May 18, 2004
- Recorded: October 2–November 19, 2003
- Genre: Christian metal
- Label: Fifty three five Records
- Producer: Michael Sweet

Stryper chronology
7: The Best of Stryper (2003)	7 Weeks: Live in America, 2003 (2004)	Reborn (2005)

Professional ratings
Review scores
Source	Rating
Allmusic	3.5/5 stars
PiercingMetal	(7.8/10)

7 Weeks: Live in America, 2003 is the eighth release and first live album by Christian metal band Stryper. Released on May 18, 2004, it was recorded during the band's reunion tour in 2003. A live DVD, titled Stryper: Live in Puerto Rico was recorded during the band's sold-out show in San Juan, Puerto Rico and was supposed to be released alongside the live album. The DVD was finally released in September 2006.

== Track listing ==
1. Sing-Along Song
2. Makes Me Wanna Sing
3. Calling on You
4. Free
5. More Than a Man
6. Caught in the Middle
7. Reach Out
8. Loud N Clear
9. The Way
10. Soldiers Under Command
11. To Hell with the Devil
12. Honestly
13. Winter Wonderland
14. Closing Prayer

== Charts ==
Chart (2003)	Peak position
US Top Christian Albums (Billboard)	31
