= Truth (1998 Michael Sweet album) =

Studio album by Michael Sweet
- Released: October 30, 1998
- Genre: Christian rock
- Label: Michael Sweet Productions
- Producer: Michael Sweet

Michael Sweet chronology
Real (1995)	Truth (1998)	Truth (2000)

Professional ratings
Review scores
Source	Rating
AllMusic	(?)

Truth is a demo album released by Christian rock singer and Stryper frontman, Michael Sweet. The album was independently produced by Sweet and released in 1998 under his own label.

The album was sold through Sweet's website and did very well selling over 10,000 units, prompting several labels to seek rights to release it. The album was re-released two years later (see Truth (2000 version)).

Two of the songs ("One" and "Rain") were not included in the 2000 version.

== Track listing ==
All songs written by Michael Sweet, except where noted:

1. "Truth" (Sweet, Joel Christian) - 4:48
2. "I Am Adam" (Sweet, Christian) - 4:29
3. "Blue Bleeds Through" (Sweet, Paul Heusman) - 4:22
4. "Wool & Chiffon" - 4:45
5. "Lift My Head" (Sweet, Heusman) - 4:15
6. "One" (Sweet, Christian) - 5:36
7. "Achilles Heel" (Sweet, Christian) - 3:52
8. "Rain" (Sweet, Heusman) - 3:28
9. "Distracted" (Sweet, Heusman) - 4:58
10. "Stone" (Sweet, Christian) - 5:01

== Personnel ==
- Michael Sweet - lead vocals, acoustic and electric guitars
- Kenny Lewis - drums and percussion
- Chris Miles - bass guitar
- Rob Graves - additional acoustic guitars
- Rob Keith - guitar solo on "Distracted"
- Taylor Armerding- mandolin on "One"
- Muzzy - drums
- Philip Bynoe - bass guitar
- Steve Hunt - organ and strings
- Deddrick Terry - piano and strings
- Pete Vantine - piano and orchestrations on "Stone"
- Gigi Abraham - additional vocals on "One"
- Nick Ventresca - additional background vocals on "Truth
