= The Truth (British rapper) =

British rapper

- Genres: Hip hop
- Occupation: Rapper
- Years active: 2008–2013

The Truth is a UK-based Asian rapper. His music has been featured on BBC Radio 1 and BBC Asian Network.

== Career ==
In June 2011, The Truth performed with a live band on the BBC Introducing stage at Glastonbury Festival.

On 1 October 2011, The Truth won Best Urban Act at the Brit Asia Awards.

== Singles ==
- "Brown Butterfly" (produced by Bobby Wonda) 2009
- "Kya Karoon" (produced by Bobby Wonda) 2010
- "Sharabi" (produced by Mentor Beats) 2010
- "Sheila Ki Jawani" (Friction Lab Remix with Bobby Wonda) 2011
- "Jaan Jayegi" (produced by Bobby Wonda) 2011
- "I Make 'Em Say" (produced by Pinju) 2011
