= Michael Sweet =

American singer and guitarist (born 1963)

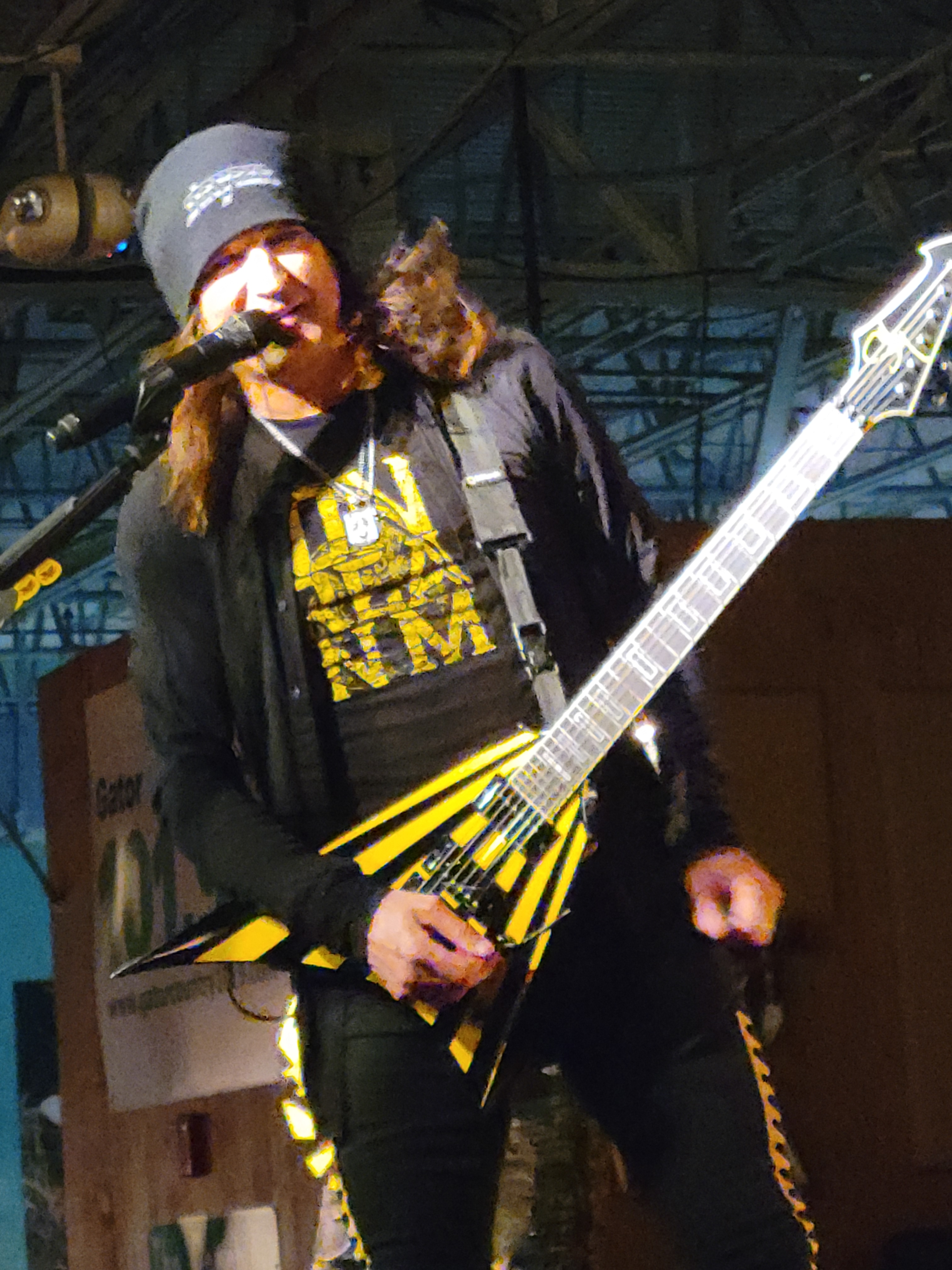
- Sweet with Stryper in 2022

Background information
- Born: Michael Harrison Sweet; July 4, 1963 (age 63); Whittier, California, U.S.
- Genres: Christian metal; hard rock; heavy metal; glam metal
- Occupations: Musician; singer; songwriter; producer
- Instruments: Vocals; guitar
- Years active: 1975–present
- Member of: Stryper
- Formerly of: Boston; Sweet & Lynch
- Website: michaelsweet.com

Michael Harrison Sweet (born July 4, 1963) is an American musician, the co-founder, principal songwriter, guitarist, and lead singer of the heavy metal band Stryper. Spin has described him as "Stryper's vocalist and principal songwriter." He has also had a successful solo career, recorded with the supergroups Sweet & Lynch and Sunbomb, and served as singer and guitarist for Boston from 2007 to 2011.

Sweet sings in a tenor voice incorporating techniques such as vibrato; his vocal style was characterised as sounding like "Dennis DeYoung fronting a Christian glam metal band" by Ultimate Classic Rock, in their ranking of the Top 15 Hair Metal Singers from the hard rock bands that dominated the airwaves in the '80s.

== From Roxx to Stryper, band formation and conversion ==
Sweet has described his teenage immersion in the Sunset Strip club scene as a departure from his family's earlier faith: "We actually accepted Christ, the whole family, and then we started going to church. But the more Robert and I got into music and playing the clubs, the less we were going to church." Sweet recalled a specific encounter outside Gazzarri's nightclub with followers of street evangelist Arthur Blessitt, who preached on the Sunset Strip carrying a large wooden cross: "I was one of the guys that they preached to. Here I am knowing that what they're saying is true, at least according to my beliefs. But at the same time I'm standing there with a drink in my hand smoking a cigarette and talking to Stephen Pearcy. So I wasn't living the life." According to Michael Sweet's autobiography, the band's 1983 rededication to Christianity was catalysed by a visit from Kenny Metcalf — a keyboardist who had recently become a Christian himself — to a Roxx Regime rehearsal. Metcalf reportedly told the band that if they devoted themselves fully to God, "He's going to take you places you've never dreamed of." Around 1983, following his brother's appeal to the group, Sweet recalled the band's collective decision to change direction: "It was an easy thing for us to say, 'All right, let's do it.' We said a prayer, we started rewriting lyrics, and from that day forward, we changed everything and went down a different path."

Vicky Hamilton, manager of Guns N' Roses, Poison, and Faster Pussycat, independently corroborated the band's Sunset Strip period, recalling that she knew them as "Bobby and Michael from Roxx Regime" from seeing them perform at Gazzarri's before learning of their faith. Visiting the band's rehearsal space in La Mirada, she recalled seeing "the 777, the Isaiah quote on the wall" without initially recognising the band as a Christian act, despite having grown up with fundamentalist Christian parents herself. Hamilton went on to book the band for Bon Jovi's first Los Angeles performance, at the Country Club in Reseda, California.

== Songwriting and creative process ==
Sweet has written or co-written the majority of Stryper's original material throughout the band's history; across the band's first five releases, 37 of 48 original compositions bore his name alone. Sweet has addressed public misconceptions about how this material is written, explaining that the band's songwriting has never followed a collective, in-the-room process: "I think people have this way of thinking that we always all wrote as a band. And I always get flack for it when I say I'm writing the new album... [People say], 'Why don't you do it like the old days and all you guys get in the room together and write the album?' And I'm, like, 'That never happened. That's not how it was.'" He described the band's longstanding studio dynamic: "Most of the time I was in a corner of the studio while Oz [Fox] was rehearsing or varnishing something and Robert [Sweet] was taping something, I was in the corner writing songs. And I was kind of always the music guy, Rob was always the visual guy, and that's just how it's always been... There's a certain structure and format to that. And everyone seems happy with it — the band and the fans." Sweet has described his lyric writing as rooted in his faith: "Of course I pray when I'm writing... Everything lyrically is biblically based."

== Stryper ==
Michael Sweet joined his brother Robert's band in Whittier, California in the late 1970s, at around the age of 13, as the group evolved through several names before settling on Roxx Regime around 1981 and subsequently becoming Stryper. The band's classic lineup — Michael on lead vocals and guitar, Robert Sweet on drums, Oz Fox on guitar, and Tim Gaines on bass — recorded the albums that defined the band's commercial peak, including the platinum-certified To Hell with the Devil (1986) and the gold-certified In God We Trust (1988).

Having established themselves on the Sunset Strip and Hollywood club circuit as Roxx Regime alongside peers including Ratt, Mötley Crüe, and Quiet Riot, the band returned to their Christian faith around 1983 and subsequently became one of the first heavy metal acts to reach both the mainstream rock market and the Contemporary Christian Music audience simultaneously. Bassist Perry Richardson joined the band in 2017 and remains a member of the current lineup.

Todd Allan Yasui of The Washington Post reviewed the To Hell with the Devil live show at the Warner Theatre (Washington D.C.) in March 1987. He called the show "a relentless attack of heavy metal thunder" and described Sweet's vocals as comparatively restrained for heavy metal, noting that he avoided the "icy shrieks" associated with many contemporaneous metal singers.

Sweet has described the creative division of labour within the band as longstanding and understood by all members: "I was kind of always the music guy, Rob was always the visual guy, and that's just how it's always been." He has reflected candidly on the band's famous yellow-and-black visual identity — designed by his brother Robert — noting that the colour scheme's cultural dominance sometimes overshadows what he considers the band's more substantive legacy: "Nine times out of ten that's what people remember us for. It's just the colours, not a song or a message. And it's a little frustrating at times. Actually, it's very frustrating at times. I would prefer that people remember us for the music and the message, rather than the yellow and the black."

== Legacy and self-assessment ==
Reflecting on Stryper's commercial peak in 1987, when "Free" and "Honestly" charted simultaneously in MTV's Top 10, Sweet recalled the band's standing on the network's viewer-request programme Dial MTV: "We beat Bon Jovi, Mötley Crüe, Poison." He has described the band's position relative to its commercial peers candidly: "We're sometimes referred to as B leaguers instead of A leaguers like the mighty Van Halen or Judas Priest — some of my favorite bands of all time. But we went against all the odds and we won. A band that sings about God in yellow and black bumblebee outfits, we're not everyone's cup of tea. Somehow, we were able to be very successful, gold and platinum albums, sold out arena shows in the '80s, No. 1 videos. That's miraculous." American Songwriter characterised Sweet's career as encompassing leadership of "one of the most trailblazing groups of the MTV generation," authorship of "a stable of Billboard charting singles," and "a stint co-leading one of the most legendary classic rock acts ever" in reference to his tenure with Boston.

In a 2014 interview tied to the release of his memoir Honestly: My Life and Stryper Revealed, Sweet reflected candidly on the band's Against the Law era: "That was in some sense a 'No God' album. Lyrically, it was still involving and including God, but at the same time our lifestyles didn't portray that. We were bringing booze on the bus, girls on the bus... We were, in my view, perfect examples of hypocrisy." He has also expressed reservations about the "Christian music" label applied to the band: "If you're gonna put a Christian tag on us, you should have to put a Satan tag on a bunch of other bands... it's just metal."

Sweet has consistently defended the band's practice of performing in secular venues and alongside mainstream acts: "A lot of Christians have given us a ton of heat over the years for doing that. Not understanding… 'Why do you guys play clubs? Why do you play with secular bands?' Well, why wouldn't we? Aren't we to go into the world… into the dark… and bring the light? I mean, that's what we're called to do as Christians. We play clubs, we go to places where no Christian bands go. We play with mainstream secular bands so we can play to their fans and we can talk to them. I mean, that's kind of the whole point in what we do."

== Solo ==
After nine years as the lead singer/lead guitarist of Stryper, Sweet left the band in 1992 in order to pursue a solo career. He first released a demo album, Unstryped, which featured several songs allegedly intended for the band. Sweet later included some of these on his first full-length album.

His self-titled debut album was released in 1994 and sold over 250,000 copies. Sweet's 1995 solo video "Ain't No Safe Way" was rejected by MTV, Sweet stated: "I view it as cowardice," attributing the rejection to religious discrimination. An MTV spokeswoman stated the rejection was unrelated to subject matter, citing other programming priorities at the time and noting the clip did not meet the network's quality standards. He followed it with a slightly softer album titled Real in 1996 earning him a Dove Award nomination. Soon after the release of Real, Sweet left Benson Records, with whom he had released the two albums.

During this time, Sweet and his wife Kyle moved to Massachusetts, where Sweet worked at his father-in-law's campground/cranberry business, Maple Park. In 1998, he released an independent demo album titled Truth which received critical acclaim. He was signed to Restless Records and re-released Truth in 2000 with a new song-list and new artwork.

On August 19, 2007, Sweet was asked by Boston's Tom Scholz to be one of the lead singers and guitarists for Come Together: A Tribute to the Life of Brad Delp at the Bank of America Pavilion in Boston. Scholz then asked Sweet to join Boston for the band's summer 2008 tour with Styx as the opening act.

In January 2026, Sweet announced an upcoming worship album, The Master Plan, which was released on April 3, 2026 to critical acclaim. (Note: Attributed to multiple sources:)

== Boston ==
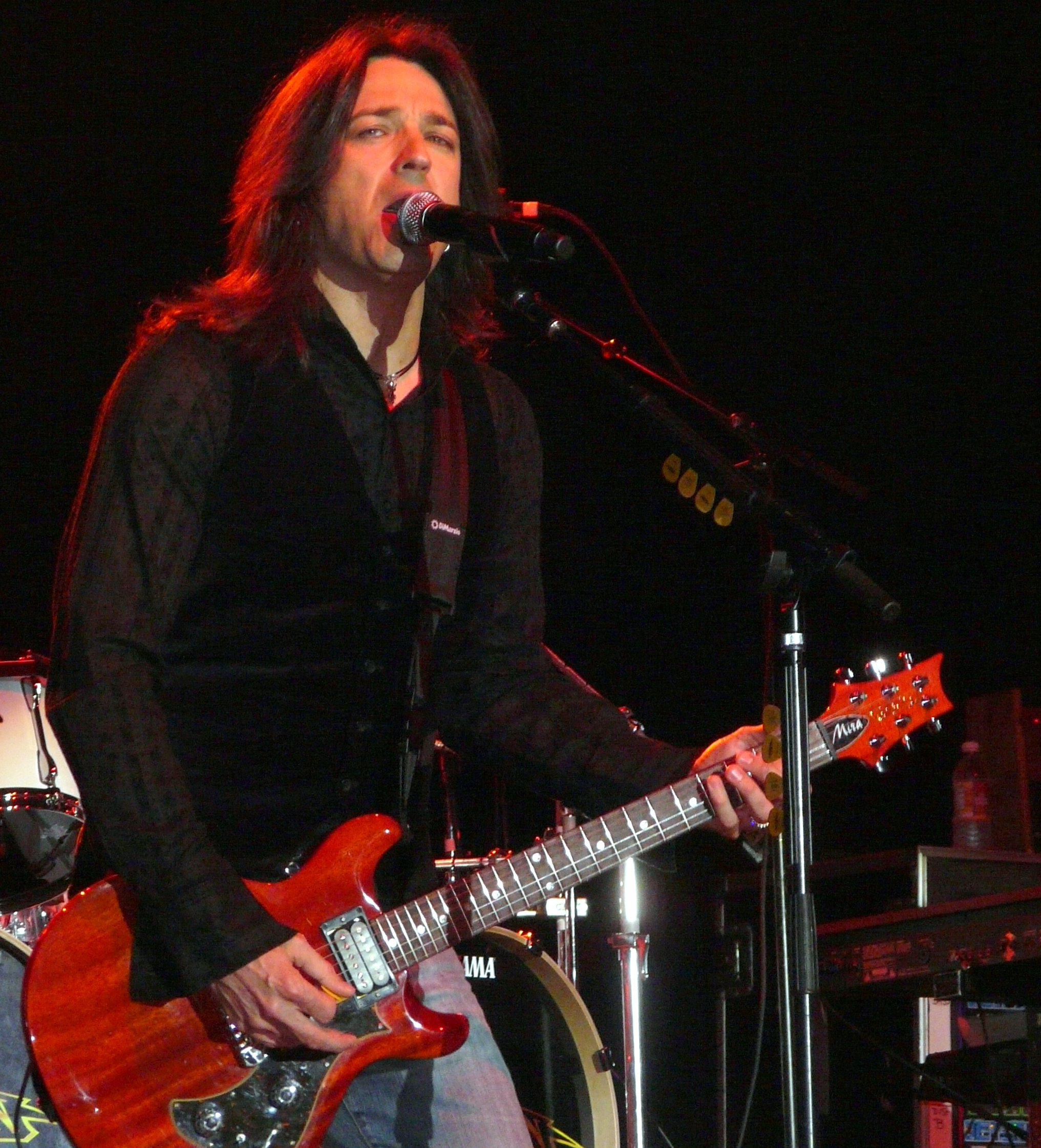
Michael Sweet performing with Boston on June 13, 2008

Sweet performed lead vocals, background vocals, and guitar work for Boston. Sweet was asked to be a part of what was supposed to be Boston's last performance on August 19, 2007. It was a benefit and tribute show and names such as Sammy Hagar, Mickey Thomas and Ann Wilson were among the invited guests. Tom Scholz was moved by what Sweet had written about the late Brad Delp and then heard Sweet sing and play guitar. Scholz was so impressed with Sweet's talents that he invited him to join the band and become a permanent member. Boston began booking a tour for 2008 with Styx as the opening act. Sweet handled lead vocals on roughly half of the set list and played guitar for the entire set and handled solo work as well. In August 2011, it was announced that Sweet had left Boston to focus on his priorities and contributions to Stryper.

== Stryper reunion ==
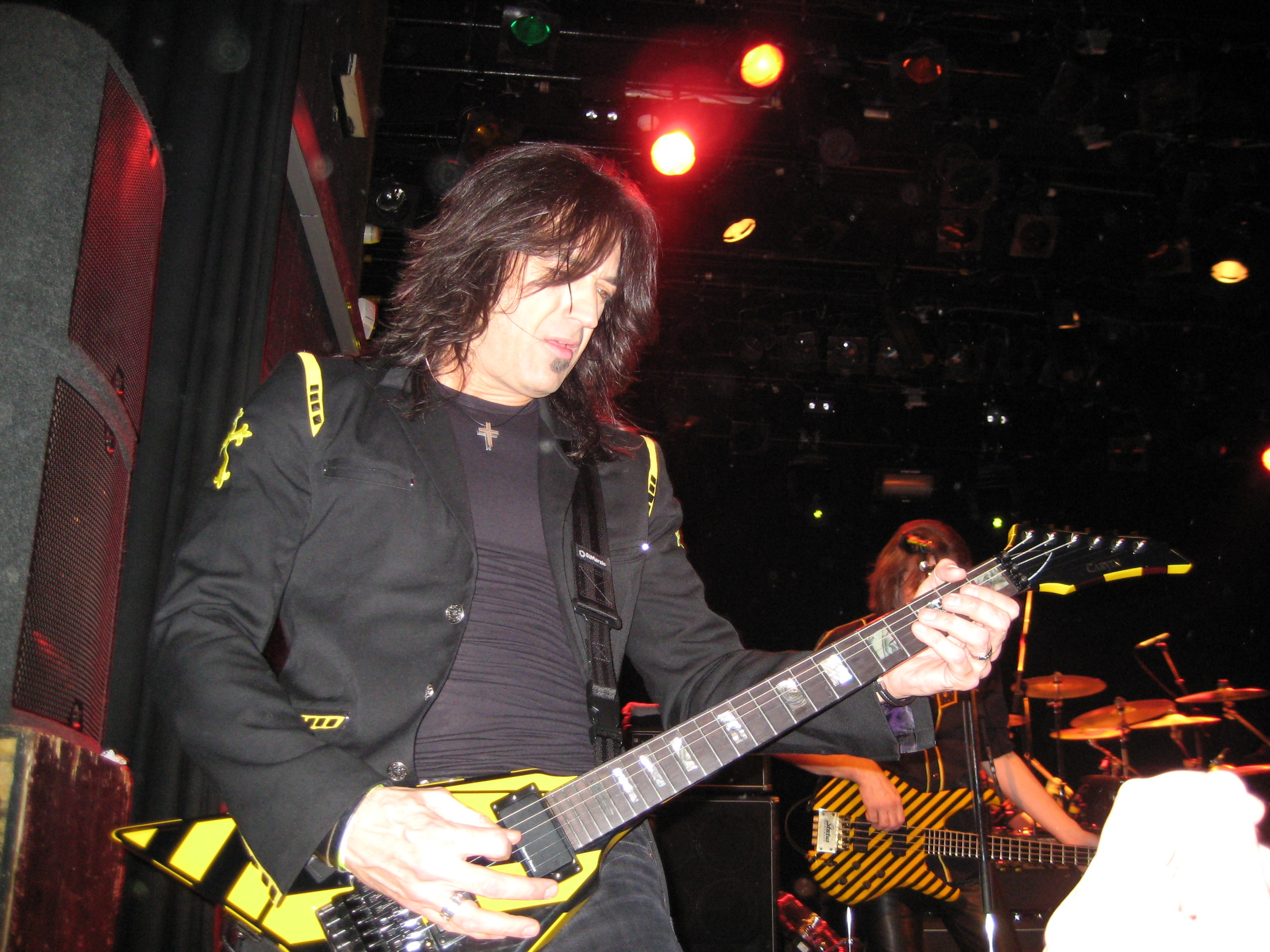
Michael Sweet at Tivoli, Utrecht

In 1999, Sweet reunited with former Stryper bandmates Oz Fox and Tim Gaines during a concert in Puerto Rico. The concert featured Fox and Gaines's band, SinDizzy. Sweet was invited as a solo artist. The three of them got together for a set of four songs. The next year, the first Stryper Expo was held in New Jersey and the entire line-up was reunited again.

Although original bassist, Tim Gaines, left the group in 2005 and was replaced by Tracy Ferrie, the band has continued to work together, releasing a new album titled Reborn, produced by Sweet. However, he has continued with his solo career as well. In August 2006, he released a solo album titled Him which features traditional hymns re-written and arranged by Sweet. The band then released the album Murder by Pride, produced by Sweet in July 2009. Perry Richardson who is formerly of the band Firehouse is now the bassist for the band. Perry has brought a new life into the band and they are currently touring and planning a new studio album to be released in 2020.

In 2007, Sweet released an album called Touched in honor of his wife, Kyle, who died on March 5, 2009, after a two-year battle with ovarian cancer.

In September 2009, Stryper embarked on its 25th anniversary world tour, "Rocking the Hell Out of You for 25 years" with the original members. The tour included two opening bands: Manic Drive and Flight Patterns, the latter which includes Sweet's son, Michael Sweet Jr.

On February 15, 2011, Stryper released a new record entitled The Covering, produced by Sweet.

In 2013, Stryper released two studio albums, Second Coming and No More Hell to Pay via Frontiers Records. They released a live album and DVD, Stryper: Live at the Whiskey, recorded in 2013 at the Whisky a Go Go on the Sunset Strip recorded from November 2013. Sweet has also worked with Lynch Mob founder and former Dokken member George Lynch on recording an album, Only to Rise, released under the name Sweet & Lynch. Sweet discussed the group on Eddie Trunk Podcast dated February 4, 2015. The group also consists of former White Lion and former Megadeth member James LoMenzo on bass, and former Whitesnake and former Foreigner member Brian Tichy on drums. Only to Rise was released on January 27, 2015.

Aside from Stryper developing their new album, Fallen, Sweet has confirmed he has signed with Rat Pak Records to release a new solo album in early 2016, One Sided War.

During an interview with Antihero Magazine in November 2016, Sweet confirmed that he is recording another Sweet & Lynch album titled Unified which released November 2017. Since then, Sweet has gone on record stating Sweet & Lynch may have run its course citing Lynch's hands in many different projects has not allowed them to tour to promote the albums, the way Sweet would have liked, and he feels he has to do most of the promoting himself.

Sweet, as a member of Stryper, released God Damn Evil on April 20, 2018. Due to its album title, it was deemed offensive and garnered a "parental guidance" label and was banned from Walmart. Despite this controversy the album sold and charted well with most major music indexes. Perry Richardson did not perform on the album but toured in support of the album.

Sweet released his tenth studio album, Ten, on RatPak Records in late 2019.

Sweet also participated as guitarist, lead singer and producer on Stryper's Even the Devil Believes that was released on September 4, 2020.

== Collaborations ==
Sweet co-founded the supergroup Sweet & Lynch with George Lynch of Dokken and Lynch Mob, also featuring James LoMenzo (formerly of White Lion and Megadeth) on bass and Brian Tichy (formerly of Whitesnake and Foreigner) on drums. The group released Only to Rise in 2015, Unified in 2017, and Heart & Sacrifice in 2023.

In 2021, Sweet recorded Evil and Divine with Tracii Guns of L.A. Guns under the name Sunbomb. In 2022, he joined the supergroup Iconic alongside guitarist Joel Hoekstra (of Whitesnake), vocalist Nathan James (of Inglorious), bassist Marco Mendoza, and drummer Tommy Aldridge, contributing guitar and taking lead vocals on select tracks. Describing the songwriting process behind the project, Sweet recalled: "Joel came up with the riffs — an intro riff, a verse riff, and a chorus riff — and then I had to take those and complete them and make them songs." In 2023, Sweet released Return to the Light with Italian producer and multi-instrumentalist Alessandro Del Vecchio under the name SoleDriver.

Sweet's solo albums have featured a range of guest guitarists, including Joel Hoekstra, Gus G of Firewind, Jeff Loomis of Arch Enemy, and Tracii Guns. Distinguishing this work from his Iconic collaboration with Hoekstra, Sweet noted: "The stuff that Joel and I have been a part of is my solo stuff. And I wrote those songs and he played on them... but the first time we've written together was [Iconic]."

In 2024, Sweet contributed a reimagined version of his original guitar solo to for King & Country and Lecrae's cover of "To Hell with the Devil", retitled "To Hell with the Devil (RISE)", recorded for the soundtrack of the film Unsung Hero. The Smallbone brothers credited "Michael Sweet reinventing his iconic guitar solo at the end" as a centrepiece of the reworked track. The accompanying soundtrack also included a separate original piece, "Stryper Interlude", featuring Sweet.

== Personal life ==
Sweet met his wife Kyle while making Stryper's first video. They were married for 22 years and had two children together. In 2009, Kyle died after a two-year battle with cancer.

On January 8, 2010, Sweet married Lisa Champagne. Sweet currently lives in southern Massachusetts.

In December 2025, Sweet announced he had been diagnosed with papillary thyroid cancer, describing the condition as slow-growing and stating that his doctors were optimistic about his prognosis. Sweet stated that the diagnosis would not affect Stryper's recording schedule, with surgery planned following the completion of the band's twenty-first studio album.

In May 2026, Stryper released the single "I'm Alright (I'm Okay)", which Sweet confirmed was written about the experience: "These lyrics are based on my personal battle with cancer and rising above that and no matter what, knowing that I'm Alright. I'm okay. It's an anthem to anyone who is going through tough times and it is meant to be inspiring and to help others keep the faith during the storm."

== Discography ==
=== Solo ===
==== Studio albums ====
Year	Album details	Peak chart positions				Certifications (sales thresholds)
Year	Album details	US	US Christ.	US Rock	US Hard Rock	Certifications (sales thresholds)
1994	Michael Sweet: Released: April 7, 1994; Label: Benson	—	4	—	—	
1995	Real: Released: September 28, 1995; Label: Benson	—	12	—	—	
1998	Truth (demo): Released: October 30, 1998; Label: Independent	—	—	—	—	
2000	Truth (official): Released: 2000; Label: Restless	—	—	—	—	
2006	Him: Released: August 1, 2006; Label: Infinity	—	—	—	—	
2007	Touched: Released: November 30, 2007	—	—	—	—	
2014	I'm Not Your Suicide: Released: May 6, 2014; Label: Big3	154	14	40	10	
2015	Only to Rise (with George Lynch, as Sweet & Lynch): Released: January 27, 2015; Label: Frontiers	120	4	18	6	
2016	One Sided War: Released: August 26, 2016; Label: Rat Pak	77	1	4	1	
2017	Unified (with George Lynch, as Sweet & Lynch): Released: November 10, 2017; Label: Frontiers	— (Note: Unified did not enter the Billboard 200, but peaked at No. 69 on the Billboard Top Album Sales chart.)	7	— (Note: Unified did not enter the Billboard Top Rock Albums chart, but peaked at No. 13 on the Billboard Rock Album Sales chart.)	15	
2019	Ten: Released: October 11, 2019; Label: Rat Pak; Formats: CD, LP, CS (Note: Cassette available only by pre-order.)	185	4	34	11	
2021	Reborn Again (Unreleased solo version of the album that became Stryper's 2005 Reborn Album): Released: April 2021; Label: Girder Music; Formats: CD, LP	—	—	—	—	
2021	Evil and Divine (with Tracii Guns, as Sunbomb): Released: May 14, 2021; Label: Frontiers	—	—	—	—	
2023	Heart & Sacrifice (with George Lynch, as Sweet & Lynch): Released: May 19, 2023; Label: Frontiers Music SR	—	—	—	—	
2026	The Master Plan: Released: April 3, 2026; Label: Frontiers Music SR	—	47	—	—	
"—" denotes a release that did not chart.

2023 Return to the Light

(with Alessandro Del Vecchio as. SoleDriver)

• Released November 17th, 2023

• Label: Frontiers Music SR

==== Extended plays ====
Year	Album details
1992 (Recorded) / 1999 (Released)	Unstryped: Released: September 23, 1999; Label: Independent

==== Video albums ====
Year	Album details
2017	Sole: Songs and Stories From a Life in Music: Format: DVD

=== Guest appearances ===
- 1989: I 2 (EYE), Michael W. Smith (duet and background vocals on "All You're Missin' Is a Heartache")
- 1992: Free at Last, DC Talk (background vocals)
- 2004: Welcome to the Revolution, Liberty N' Justice (lead vocals on "Blind Man's Bluff")
- 2014: Onward to Freedom, Tourniquet (lead vocals & lead guitar on title song)
