= JC's Girls =

21st-century American evangelical organization

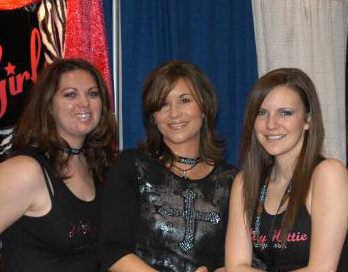
- The JC's Girls booth at the 2007 AVN Adult Entertainment Expo
- Formation: March 25, 2005; 21 years ago
- Founders: Heather Veitch; Lori Albee
- Type: Religious organization
- Purpose: To evangelize to women in the sex industry
- Headquarters: Las Vegas, US
- Location: United States
- Leader: Laura Bonde
- Affiliations: Sandals Church, Riverside, California; Central Christian Church, Henderson, Nevada

JC's Girls (short for Jesus Christ's Girls, also called the JC's Girls Girls Girls Ministry) is an evangelical Christian women's organization in the United States whose members evangelize to female workers in the sex industry. The organization supports women wishing to leave the industry, but does not try to persuade them to do so. The group does not focus upon conversion but rather on communicating its message that Christians exist who are not judging female sex workers and are willing to accept them. The organization also helps both women and men seeking to overcome pornography addiction.

The organization was founded by Heather Veitch, who worked as a stripper for four years before becoming a Christian and leaving the sex industry in 1999. She founded JC's Girls on Good Friday in March 2005; it was based at Sandals Church in Riverside, California, with the support of the California Southern Baptist Convention. In January 2006, JC's Girls went to Las Vegas to operate a booth at the AVN Adult Entertainment Expo that received much traffic and news coverage. By 2008, Veitch had moved to Las Vegas and based the organization at Central Christian Church in nearby Henderson, Nevada. The former stripper and call girl Theresa Scher and the social worker Sheri Brown founded the San Diego chapter of JC's Girls at Rock Church in 2007. Veitch, Scher, and Brown resigned from JC's Girls in 2011, 2012, and 2014 respectively, leaving the leadership of the organization to Laura Bonde. As of 2014, the sole chapter of JC's Girls is in San Diego.

Terry Barone, spokesperson for the California Southern Baptist Convention, said that JC's Girls members "are doing what Jesus did ... He ministered to prostitutes and tax collectors." JC's Girls members have been criticized for dressing like sex workers, a look that Veitch said is intended to help women in the sex industry identify with the group. A Baptist minister from San Bernardino, California, criticized JC's Girls for not explicitly encouraging women in the sex industry to quit, and quoted Matthew 6:24, a Bible verse that states that a person cannot serve two masters. In response to the idea that strippers should quit their jobs before attending a church, Veitch said, "Do we ask gluttons to stop eating too much before they come to church?" Philip Sherwell of the Calgary Herald called the evangelism of JC's Girls "America's most unusual Christian outreach operation".

== History ==
=== Background ===
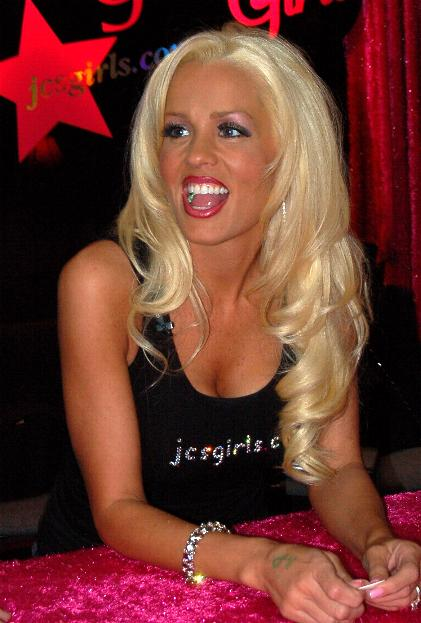
Heather Veitch founded JC's Girls after becoming a Christian and leaving a four-year career in the sex industry as a stripper and pornographic film actor.

Veitch worked as a stripper for four years in the Las Vegas area and California. After she had appeared in four pornographic films in the softcore and fetish genres—trample fetish specifically—public discussion about the Year 2000 problem and the end of the world caused her to think that she might experience divine judgment for her lifestyle.

She then became a Christian, married her boyfriend Jon, started and completed a course in cosmetology, left the sex industry, and became a hairdresser all by September 1999. In 2003, Veitch discovered that a friend of hers who was working as a stripper had died as a result of alcoholism. Veitch began to evangelize to strippers because she wished she had told her friend about the gospel before she died.

By 2005, Veitch was working as a hairdresser in Riverside, California. One of her clients was Lori Albee, a housewife with two children and no experience with the sex industry. Veitch told Albee about her friend who had died and to whom she wished she had evangelized. Albee suggested that they start telling other strippers about Jesus.

Matt Brown, Veitch's pastor at Sandals Church, arrived for a haircut and Veitch asked him for help to start an organization to minister to sex workers. He was interested. Veitch and Brown started Matthew's House, an organization they founded as "a ministry to help people working in or addicted to the sex industry". They chose the name "Matthew's House" in reference to the Calling of Matthew, a gospel episode in which Jesus eats with sinners at the home of Matthew the Apostle.

By 2011, JC's Girls chapters were based in Las Vegas, Nevada; Riverside, California; San Diego, California; Austin, Texas; and Sioux Falls, South Dakota. As of 2014, the San Diego chapter is the sole chapter that remains.

=== Riverside chapter ===
On Good Friday in March 2005, Veitch, Albee, and six other women went to a strip club in Riverside and paid for lap dances. Instead of accepting the dances, they talked with the strippers, telling them that they were loved and accepted by God, that churches were composed entirely of sinners, and that they would be welcome there. One of the lap dancers cried and told Albee she had often wanted to go to a church but had never done so because she had thought that she would be rejected. The woman accepted a prayer from Albee and hugged her.

Albee would later say that talking with women at the strip club that first day changed her life. Because the volunteers received more positive responses than they had expected, they decided to continue to evangelize at strip clubs. To organize these activities, Veitch and Albee founded JC's Girls, with "JC" standing for Jesus Christ. They made Matthew's House the parent organization, but decided to operate primarily under the name "JC's Girls" because Veitch believed that strippers would not understand the meaning of the name "Matthew's House".

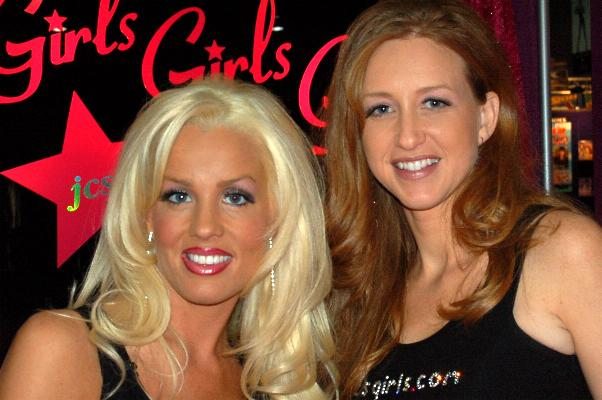
Tanya Huerter (right), who joined Heather Veitch (left) as two of JC's Girls' initial three leaders, said, "I believe God created sex for marriage. But God will meet these girls where they are."

Veitch became the head of JC's Girls, and the 17,000-member Sandals Church became the organization's base of operations. The church is part of the California Southern Baptist Convention, which supports JC's Girls. The church gave JC's Girls a $10,000 budget in its first year.

The organization's members continued visiting strip clubs across California, paying for private dances and then evangelizing the strippers. Within six months of its founding, the organization's members had persuaded several strippers to start attending a church and were only once asked to stop. One of these women was fired from a strip club because she started attending Sandals Church, but she continued attending the church, saying that Brown's preaching helped her get through the week.

By December 2005, Veitch, Albee, and teacher Tanya Huerter had become the organization's leaders. Two months later, Huerter, who also had no experience with the sex industry, said, "I have a heart for these girls. I believe God created sex for marriage. But God will meet these girls where they are." Veitch, Albee, and Huerter invited Christian women from other churches in the area to volunteer with JC's Girls, and approximately 90 churches responded with interest.

JC's Girls received public attention in December 2005, when UK newspaper The Daily Telegraph published an article about the organization's activities. The article prompted additional media coverage from other newspapers, television programs, and radio stations both across the United States and internationally, including news outlets as far away as France and India. Veitch began dividing her time between managing JC's Girls, appearing in the media, and serving as a caregiver for her terminally-ill husband, who had brain cancer.

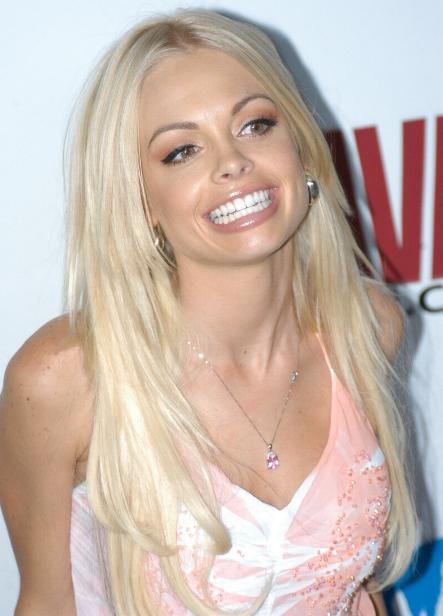
Pornographic film actor Jesse Jane was one of more than 200 women working in the sex industry who accepted Bibles from JC's Girls at the 2006 AVN Adult Entertainment Expo.

In January 2006, JC's Girls went to Las Vegas to operate a booth at the AVN Adult Entertainment Expo—the largest trade fair for pornography in the United States. The booth was decorated in the style of the booths advertising strip clubs; the women wore sleeveless shirts with the organization's name in sequins. When men attending the convention visited the booth thinking that JC's Girls was a strip club, the women asked them to guess what "JC" meant and gave attendees a sticker reading: "I've been booby-trapped by JC's Girls."

JC's Girls told thousands of male attendees about the gospel, distributed more than 200 Bibles wrapped in T-shirts reading "Holy Hottie", and gave out DVDs of a sermon by Brown about pornography addiction. Jesse Jane was one of the women who accepted a Bible. Many convention attendees wished to take pictures with the JC's Girls volunteers. Veitch was interviewed for a variety of media, including a CNN news broadcast and a documentary film by Bill Day, who had previously made the film Missionary Positions about XXXchurch.com, another Christian organization that was operating a booth at the trade fair.

Also in January 2006, Brown approved a $50,000 budget for JC's Girls for the year. By April, seven strippers had attended Sandals Church because of JC's Girls and strippers from across the United States had contacted the organization looking for local churches. In an attempt to dispel accusations that the JC's Girls message might be motivated by jealousy, Veitch lost weight and became more physically fit. She said that she wanted strippers "to know that if I wanted to, I could be a stripper again, but I choose to live my life for the Lord."

=== Original website ===
Within the first few months of founding JC's Girls, Veitch, and Albee launched the organization's first official website, which initially received little traffic. Three months later, it had received 40,000 hits. By December 2005, the organization had received messages through its website from pornographic film actors and men with pornography addiction who said that JC's Girls had changed their lives.

A slogan on the main page of the website read, "If you are a CHRISTIAN ... See us in ACTION ...". Without asking for payment, Veitch's friend, pornographic film director James DiGiorgio, took glamour photographs of Veitch, Albee, and Huerter for the JC's Girls website. DiGiorgio was not a Christian, but said that he was helping these organizations in order to support their freedom of speech; he said that the sex industry is "always trying to preach freedom of speech [so] anyone in this industry who has a problem with [JC's Girls'] message is a fucking hypocrite. You can't have it both ways." Within a year of the organization's founding, Veitch, Albee, and Huerter were maintaining Myspace pages that they used to offer support, counsel, and advice. By 2008, the JC's Girls website was receiving around 15,000 hits per day.

=== Las Vegas chapter ===
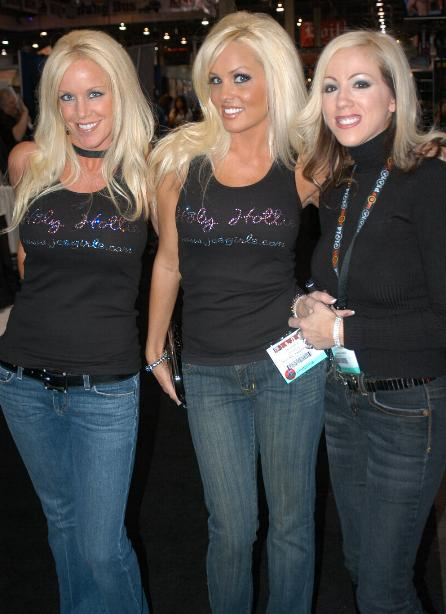
JC's Girls has collaborated with Hookers for Jesus, a similar organization founded by Annie Lobert. (left to right: Lori Albee, Heather Veitch, Lobert)

In 2008, Veitch told Brown that she believed that the JC's Girls ministry needed to move to Las Vegas, and he responded supportively. By 2008, Veitch had moved to Las Vegas and based the new chapter of JC's Girls at Central Christian Church in nearby Henderson, Nevada, leaving the leadership of the Riverside chapter to Albee. That year, Veitch collaborated with Annie Lobert, a former call girl working with Hookers for Jesus, an organization similar to JC's Girls. The organizations were both represented at that year's AVN Adult Entertainment Expo.

The PussyCat Preacher, a documentary film about Veitch's experiences starting JC's Girls, was released that February. The following month, pornographic film actor Sophia Lynn left the sex industry after becoming a Christian; she underwent more than a year of counselling with Veitch through JC's Girls. Veitch had flown to Sioux Falls, South Dakota, to spend a weekend educating Celebrate Community Church about the sex industry. The church soon gave Lynn a job in its office, a scholarship to go to college, and a place to live. Lynn said, "I hope I don't have to wake up from this. I feel like my life has been saved."

=== San Diego chapter ===
In San Diego, Theresa Scher, a stripper and call girl, was looking for a way out of the sex industry when she watched a CNN interview with Albee about her work with JC's Girls in Riverside. Scher contacted 1 because they understand from personal experience the situations of the women they are trying to help. By 2011, members of the San Diego chapter of JC's Girls were visiting strip clubs twice each month. They pray before, during, and after each visit and a team of other members pray for them from another location.

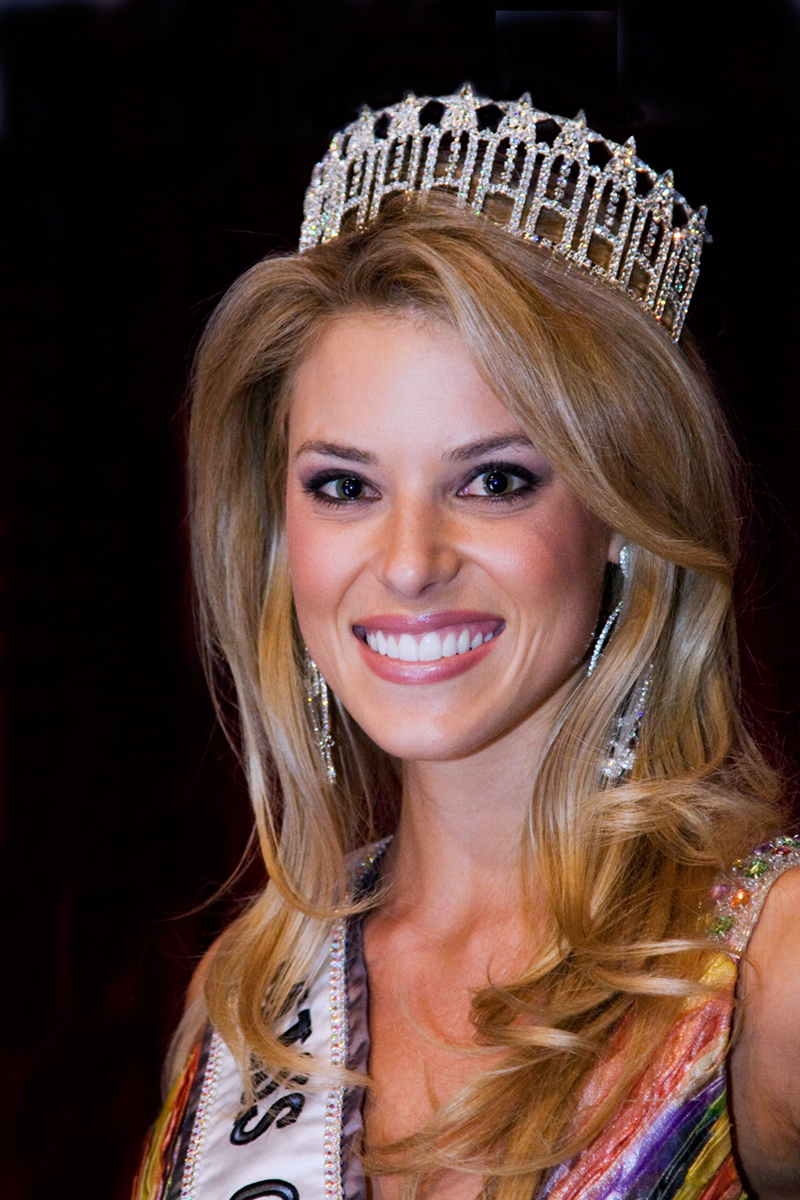
Carrie Prejean, who was crowned Miss California USA in 2009, became a member of the San Diego chapter of JC's Girls in 2008.

Carrie Prejean started volunteering with the San Diego chapter of JC's Girls in 2008 and became Miss California USA the following year. At the Miss USA 2009 competition, Prejean became the subject of a controversy because of her response to a question about same-sex marriage. Scher said that the controversy would not affect Prejean's involvement with the organization and that the issue of same-sex marriage was not relevant to the group's activities. Prejean said that in volunteering with JC's Girls, she encountered pornographic models who, through exploitation and abuse, had developed very low self-esteem but who had regained a sense of their own dignity because of their interaction with JC's Girls volunteers.

By 2009, approximately 40 women were on the chapter's active evangelism team, and they had given pink Bibles to most of the strippers in San Diego County. They paired these Bibles with other gifts, including lip gloss, necklaces, and lotions, in order to pique the strippers' interest. In August 2010, Brown went to Warsaw, Ohio, to briefly join forces with Anny Donewald, a former stripper and founder of Eve's Angels, an organization similar to JC's Girls. Together, Brown and Donewald negotiated a peace accord between women working at a strip club and members of a local church who had been picketing the club for four years.

The strippers had been counter-protesting by dancing in bikinis in front of the church during Sunday services while Tommy George, the club's owner, played music from his car. Brown and Donewald spoke at the church, urging them to stop protesting at the strip club and saying, "It's not our job to tell these women that it's time to get out of there ... Just love them. Let the Holy Spirit draw them out." Brown and Donewald also visited the strip club and spoke with the strippers, two of whom became Christians while continuing to work at the club. The peace accord received much publicity, but the church's members, led by their pastor Bill Dunfee, resumed picketing once Brown had returned to San Diego. George and his club's strippers returned to their counter-protesting.

By 2011, several of the strippers JC's Girls members had spoken with in San Diego had begun attending a Bible study hosted by the organization and the chapter had helped one stripper leave the sex industry and gain unrelated employment. In March 2011, the chapter sent a delegation to Adultcon at the Los Angeles Convention Center, where Scher and Brown spoke with conference attendees and offered them prayer. That July, Veitch resigned from JC's Girls so she could spend more time with her family, handing the leadership of the organization to Scher and Brown. In June 2012, Scher gave up her co-leadership of the organization to focus on her family, leaving the leadership to Brown.

By 2013, the organization had established guidelines regulating the transition of women from the sex industry into participation in the evangelistic activities of JC's Girls. The woman must consistently attend a Bible study for four months, read Francine Rivers' book Redeeming Love, and be interviewed by the chapter's leaders, who then decide whether the woman should join the organization's outreach team. These guidelines were established because some women who had quickly gone from working in the sex industry to evangelizing with JC's Girls soon left the organization and returned to the sex industry. Brown left JC's Girls in April 2014 and Laura Bonde took over leadership of the organization.

== Programs ==
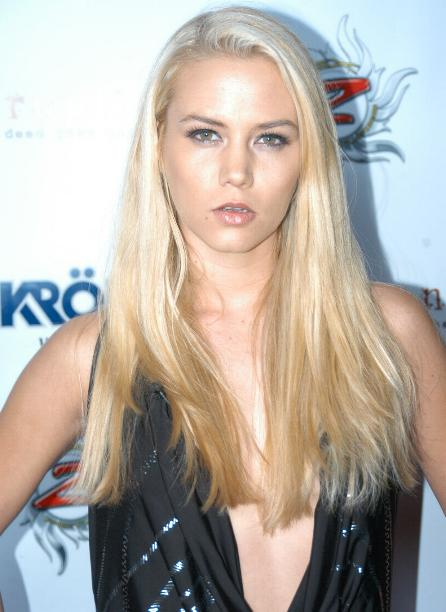
JC's Girls evangelizes to women in the sex industry such as Sophia Lynn, a pornographic film actor who subsequently became a Christian.

JC's Girls, also called the JC's Girls Girls Girls Ministry, is an evangelical organization that calls itself "a biblically-based Christian ministry". JC's Girls is less focused on seeking conversions than on communicating the message to women in the sex industry that Christians exist who are willing to non-judgmentally accept them.

Initially, the organization focused on evangelizing to strippers and erotic dancers, but later began to engage with women in other areas of the sex industry, such as softcore pornographic models and call girls. The organization also diversified to support people with pornography addiction. Members of the organization evangelize at adult entertainment conventions and strip clubs.

Out of a belief that many women in the sex industry have been spiritually abused by Christians trying to frighten them out of the sex industry with warnings of damnation, JC's Girls focuses on telling these women that God loves them. JC's Girls volunteers tell the women about the gospel but do not try to persuade them to leave the sex industry; the organization recognizes that is often not financially viable for women in the sex industry to immediately sacrifice their employment.

JC's Girls connects female sex workers with churches the organization believes to be non-judgmental, hoping that the women will experience the love of Christ through these churches and that they will thereby eventually have the support and strength they need to leave the industry. Prior to referring a woman to a church, JC's Girls puts the church through a formal approval process to ensure that the church will not be judgmental. If women express a desire to leave the sex industry, JC's Girls attempts to support them in doing so.

JC's Girls aims to convey to women in the sex industry that Jesus loves them, that they are beautiful, and that they have dignity. Its volunteers often style themselves with eyelash extensions, stiletto heels, skinny jeans, skin-tight T-shirts, and backcombed hair to convey the message that such things are, in their view, not sinful.

== Reception ==
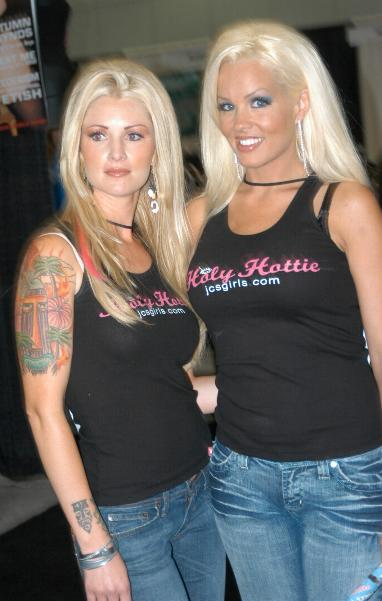
Veitch (right) said that Christians commonly say that JC's Girls dress like sex workers, but she said that the look is intended to help women in the sex industry identify with the group.

When JC's Girls first started receiving funds from Sandals Church in 2005, some of the church's members were displeased that their tithes and offerings were being given to strip clubs. In 2006, Brown said that funding the activities of JC's Girls was worthwhile because the sex industry "has been largely ignored by the evangelical church," and the budget allotted to JC's Girls is small compared to the money made by the sex industry.

Sandals Church members were also concerned that ministering to strippers would be ineffective. Brown responded by referring to Veitch's conversion, suggesting that other strippers could have similar experiences. Terry Barone of the California Southern Baptist Convention asserted that JC's Girls members "are doing what Jesus did ... He ministered to prostitutes and tax collectors."

Brown said that the most common complaint that he received about JC's Girls was "the way Heather Veitch looks... her breasts are too big, and she looks too much like a stripper", a complaint to which he responded that "God can use any individual to change the world".

Veitch said in 2008 that Christians commonly say that JC's Girls dress like sex workers, but she said that the look is intended to help women in the sex industry identify with the group. Annie Lobert of Hookers for Jesus, a similar group that collaborates with JC's Girls, said around the same time that Christians make the same kind of comments about her and her ministry—"They say my T-shirt is too tight", said Lobert, "but, hey, when in Vegas, do as Vegas does".

Controversy regarding his involvement with JC's Girls threatened to lose Brown his church facility on the California Baptist University campus, but the church united in support of JC's Girls and remained in the same location. Barone said that Baptists might find viewing the JC's Girls website awkward, but that it was not intended for them.

Stephen Clark of the Los Angeles Times called it "an edgy website [with] provocative appeals." Sarah Sumner, author of Men and Women in the Church, said in Bill Day's 2008 documentary film The Pussycat Preacher that some Christians might oppose the female-led JC's Girls because of 1 Timothy 2:12, a Bible verse that can be interpreted as restricting positions of authority in church to men. Brown said elsewhere in the film that it made more sense for women to lead JC's Girls "because a woman would be the most welcome in the industry".

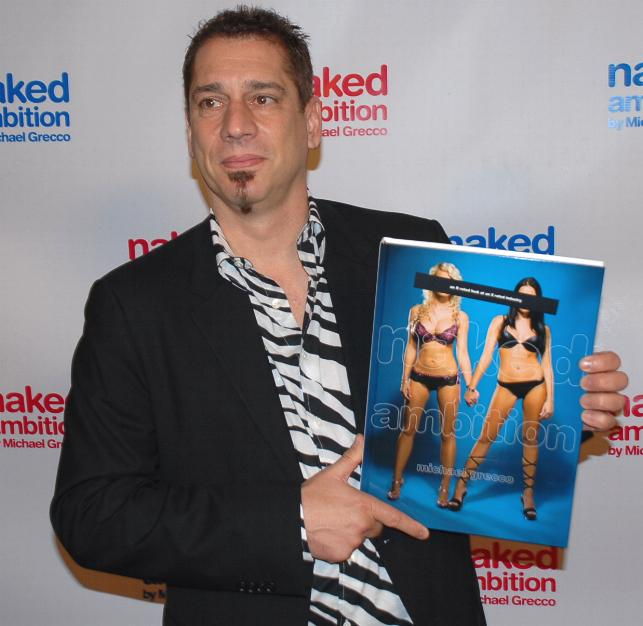
Photographer Michael Grecco included an image of Veitch, Albee, and Huerter in his 2007 book Naked Ambition: An R Rated Look at an X Rated Industry (pictured).

In its first year, JC's Girls was criticized for allowing DiGiorgio to take glamorous photographs of Veitch, Albee and Huerter for their website. Veitch responded to this criticism with the assertion that "it is not a sin to be attractive or dress cute," and that the photographs were intended to persuade women in the sex industry to dismiss the idea that Christianity is about "being locked up in a house with a Bible." DiGiorgio said that JC's Girls is correct in believing that many women in the sex industry need to be rescued from self-destructive behavior, but he did not think that encouraging the women to become Christians would necessarily help them.

The Family Research Council, an American Christian lobbying organization, has endorsed JC's Girls. In his 2013 book Evangelicals and the Arts in Fiction, writer John Weaver writes that science fiction writer Robert A. Heinlein wrote about evangelicals as being sexually repressed and eventually undergoing a sexual revolution. Weaver offers JC's Girls and XXXchurch.com as evidence that Heinlein's fiction is becoming a reality. By 2007, adherents of UFO religion Raëlism had responded to JC's Girls by forming "Raël's Girls", an organization with a similar outreach program but a very different message, encouraging sex workers to try to maximize their own sexual pleasure while serving clients. (Note: In the same way, Raëlians responded to the practice of female genital mutilation by founding Clitoraid. Raëlians hold that sexual pleasure is intrinsically valuable.)

In 2006, a Baptist minister from San Bernardino, California, criticized JC's Girls for not explicitly encouraging women in the sex industry to quit. He commended Veitch "for her zeal and desire to reach the lost for Christ", but asked, "How can you stay in the industry and have a relationship with God?", and quoted Matthew 6:24, a Bible verse that states that a person cannot serve two masters.

In response to the idea that strippers should quit their jobs before attending a church, Veitch said, "Do we ask gluttons to stop eating too much before they come to church?" At the 2006 AVN Adult Entertainment Expo, photographer Michael Grecco photographed Veitch, Albee, and Huerter and included the image in his 2007 book Naked Ambition: An R Rated Look at an X Rated Industry. In the image caption, he called the trio a "devout Christian trinity".

Philip Sherwell of the Calgary Herald called the organization's evangelism "America's most unusual Christian outreach operation". A journalist for UK newspaper The Observer compared JC's Girls to XXXchurch.com, writing in 2006 that both of "these ministries are in some way reforming the church as well as their would-be followers."
