= The Man Who Loved Women =

The Man Who Loved Women can refer to:

- The Man Who Loved Women, a 1968 novel by Ernest Borneman
- The Man Who Loved Women (1977 film), a French film by François Truffaut
- The Man Who Loved Women (1983 film), a remake of Truffaut's film by Blake Edwards
