= Hookers for Hillary =

Political organization in Nevada, US

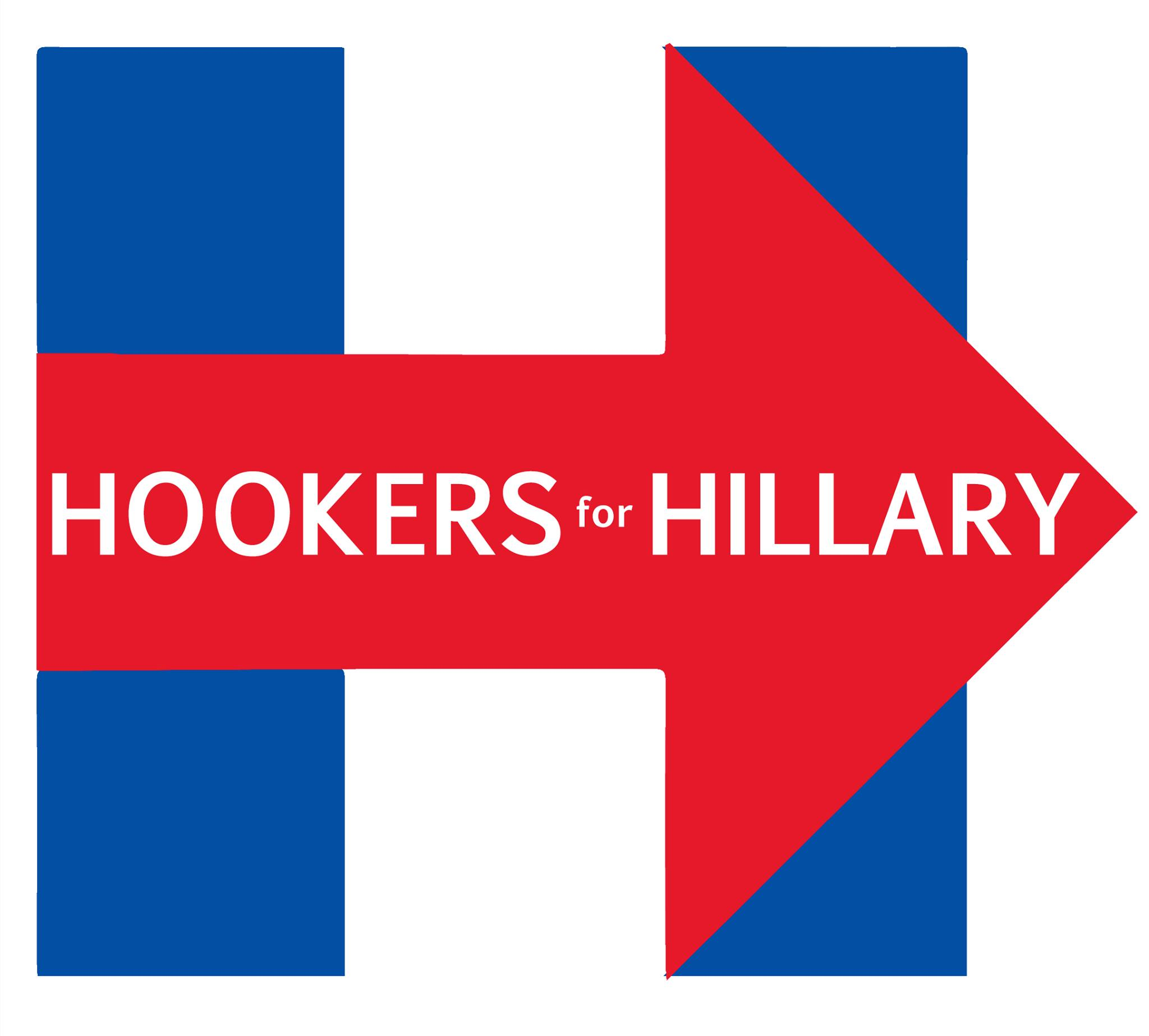
Hookers for Hillary logo that was used on its Facebook page

Hookers for Hillary was a semi-formal group of sex workers in Nevada who supported Hillary Clinton during the 2016 United States presidential election. The group, which claimed a membership of 500 prostitutes, was not registered with the Federal Election Commission as a political action committee and did not, therefore, directly provide political donations. Instead, its members promoted Clinton's candidacy to their clients. Some reports indicated that they enhanced sexual services to existing customers in exchange for direct donations to Clinton's presidential campaign.

The organization centered its support of Clinton on her health care policy proposals and foreign policy experience. According to a 2015 press release from the group, the perceived benefits of a Clinton foreign policy would include avoiding "a repeat of the Secret Service's Colombian prostitution scandal by making sure that her detail 'buys American'". Some of its members had been previously affiliated with Pimpin' for Paul, an organization of Nevada-based prostitutes that campaigned for Ron Paul in the 2008 United States presidential election and 2012 United States presidential election.

Members of the group were largely drawn from brothels owned by Nevada prostitution mogul and Libertarian Party member Dennis Hof, and the organization has been described as his "brainchild". Hof said that one of his motivations was that he wanted his workers to get involved in politics, with some of them starting Hookers for Hillary and others forming the rival organization Tarts for Trump. While stopping short of calling Hookers for Hillary a publicity stunt, Hof indicated that the group's existence helped build awareness for his businesses. Nonetheless, despite characterizations of the group as a public relations ploy designed to drive media coverage of Hof's brothels, a reporter for Vox who interviewed Hookers for Hillary members described their support for Clinton as genuine.

== See also ==
- Hillary Clinton presidential campaign, 2016
- JC's Girls
- Prostitution in Nevada
