= Adult contemporary (disambiguation) =

Adult contemporary may refer to:

- Adult contemporary music, a music genre
  - Urban adult contemporary
  - Rhythmic adult contemporary
- Adult Contemporary (chart), a Billboard chart used in the United States
- Adult Contemporary (radio network)

== See also ==
- Adult entertainment (disambiguation)
