= Lonn Friend =

American journalist and author (born 1956)

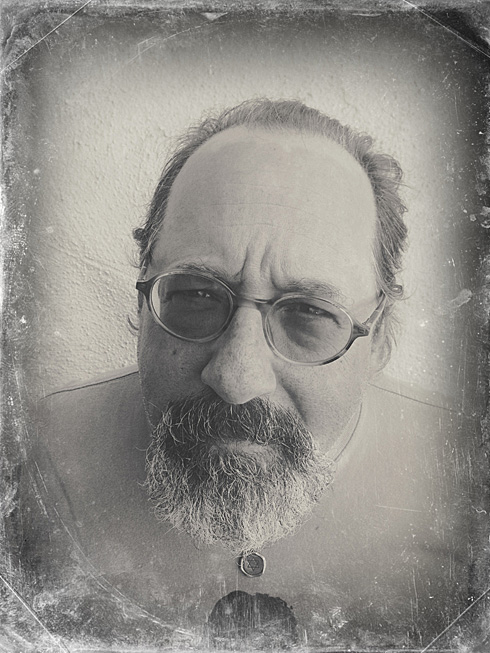
- Lonn Friend
- Born: Lonn Michael Friend; Los Angeles

Lonn Friend (born July 29, 1956) is an American journalist and author. Friend is best known for his work in the late 1980s and '90s as editor of RIP Magazine. Friend began his career in 1982, as associate editor of Hustler Magazine, the flagship journal of Larry Flynt Publications (LFP). After rising to senior editor at Hustler, he transitioned to Executive Editor of Chic Magazine, and then to RIP in the Spring of 1987. RIP was the first non-pornographic publication produced by LFP. Friend documented his experiences with the heroes of heavy metal in his 2006 memoir, Life on Planet Rock, and released his follow-up, Sweet Demotion, in 2011. He is currently the host of Energize: The Lonn Friend Podcast.

During his tenure at RIP, Friend documented the making of Metallica's The Black Album. Friend also appeared in several documentaries profiling the band, including A Year and a Half in the Life of Metallica, Classic Albums: Black, AURAL Amphetamine: Metallica and the Dawn of Thrash, and VH1's Behind the Music: Metallica. The cover art of The Black Album debuted on his Friend at Large segment for MTV's Headbangers Ball in August 1991.

RIP was designed by art director Craig Jones and was the first magazine to feature a full-cover photo and story on Guns N' Roses, titled "Metal's New Supergroup," which appeared in its June 1988 issue. Guns N' Roses performed their last club gig for the third-anniversary RIP party at the Park Plaza Hotel in October 1989, prior to their four-night opening stint for the Rolling Stones at the Los Angeles Memorial Coliseum.

In addition to hosting his spot on Headbanger's Ball, Friend helmed the syndicated Westwood One radio program, "Pirate Radio Saturday Night." He penned weekly columns for the influential industry tip sheets HITS and the Album Network, and co-authored the Rolling Stone cover story on Slash from Guns N' Roses (with Jeffrey Ressner). He served as music supervisor for Adam Sandler's motion picture debut, Airheads.

Friend co-founded Maximum Golf magazine with former Details/Men's Journal editor Michael Caruso in 1999. Friend served as the innovative lifestyle publication's consulting editor for its year-long run.

Friend composed the liner notes for Mötley Crüe's Decade of Decadence, Bon Jovi's One Wild Night Live 1985-2001, Dio's Stand Up and Shout: The Dio Anthology, The Essential Iron Maiden, Rhino/Warner Bros.' The Heavy Metal Box, and most recently, his words open the special-edition collector's box set for Michael Franti & Spearhead's All Rebel Rockers (Anti/Epitaph). In the style of a high-school yearbook, Friend wrote the liner notes to the Alice Cooper box set Alice Cooper "Old School" (1964-1974) (Universal UK)..

Friend is a frequent contributor to VH1, having appeared in numerous Behind the Music documentary episodes, including "Metallica," "Bon Jovi," "The Year 1987," "Red Hot Chili Peppers Ultimate Albums: Blood, Sugar, Sex, Magik," "Mötley Crüe," "Anthrax," "Top 40 Hair Metal Bands of All Time" and "When Metal Ruled the World." He was featured in the October 2006 E! Entertainment's two-hour expose, "E!s 20 Acts of Love Gone Wrong," the June 2007 "E! True Hollywood Story: Steven and Liv Tyler," and consulted for and appeared in two new 2009 productions: E!'s "Rock Wives" and VH1's "Do it for the Band: The Women of the Sunset Strip." Friend also consulted on the 2010 documentary Rock Prophecies about rock photographer Robert Knight, directed by John Chester.

The U.K.'s Sexy Intellectual Productions featured Friend extensively in their recent DVD releases, Guns N' Roses: 2 Classic Albums Under Review (Use Your Illusion I and II) and AURAL Amphetamine: Metallica and the Dawn of Thrash.

Friend relocated to Las Vegas in the fall of 2003, and freelanced for several local publications including Las Vegas Life, Las Vegas Weekly, Vegas Golfer and HRH (Hard Rock Hotel). He returned to Los Angeles in March 2006.

Life on Planet Rock (Morgan Road/Random House) was released domestically on July 11, 2006, and is in its second printing. Planet Rock was published in the U.K. through Piatkus Books.

I wrote my memoir while in Las Vegas, during those 29 transforming months on the sands of Babylon, chronicling my journey for local publications and encountering the light people amongst America's most shadowy metropolis.

His second book, Sweet Demotion: How an Almost Famous Rock Journalist Lost Everything and Found Himself (Almost), was published by AuthorHouse in 2011. Picking up at the end of Friend's stint as an executive at Arista Records, Demotion follows his move to Las Vegas and the spiritual pursuits that shaped his further involvement in the music world.

Friend co-edited, with Rob Hill, the coffee table book Naked Ambition: An R Rated Look at an X Rated Industry, by celebrity photographer Michael Grecco. Published by San Francisco-based Rock Out Books, Naked Ambition was published in November 2007.

As resident video archivist and board member for the Guitar Center's Hollywood Rock Walk, Friend conducted interviews in 2008 and 2009 with such notable inductees as Michelle Phillips, Lou Adler, Keb' Mo', George Thorogood, Zakk Wylde, Terry Bozzio, Slash, Ronnie James Dio, Debbie Harry and Chris Stein of Blondie, Yngwie Malmsteen, the Germs, Kenny Loggins, The Smashing Pumpkins, Steve Vai, and others.

In 2008, Friend composed artist bios and conducted electronic press interviews for several bands. In this regard, he covered Black Tide, Rev Theory, Candlebox, and the multi-platinum All American Rejects. Friend contributed to the "Soapbox" column for Relix Magazine, and drafted the Metallica cover story for the December 2008 issue of Metal Edge. Between 2010 and 2012, Friend composed artist bios for Slash featuring Myles Kennedy and the Conspirators; John Waite; and Brazilian guitarist Kiko Loureiro. In March 2012, he launched Energize: The Lonn Friend Podcast via LA Radio Studios in San Pedro, California. In January 2014, Friend returned to Las Vegas to work on his third book. He currently freelances for Wendoh Media's Vegas Seven magazine and in February 2014 composed the cover story on noted rock & roll chef Kerry Simon.

Friend contributed editorial content to Dr. Gabrielle Francis' upcoming health and fitness book, The Rockstar Remedy, being published by HarperCollins in Fall 2014. The musicians he interviewed for the volume include Steven Tyler, Ted Nugent, Kevin Cronin, Steve Lukather, Phil Collen, Orianthi, Dave Navarro, Fred Coury, Rudy Sarzo, Share Pedersen Ross, Scott Ian, Pearl Aday and Serj Tankian.

In 2016, Friend became a freelance contributing writer for Chicago-based, In The Loop Magazine, with articles that have included Roger Hodgson.
