= Hookers for Jesus =

American evangelical Christian organization

- Successor: Pink Chair
- Formation: 2005; 21 years ago
- Founders: Annie Lobert
- Headquarters: Las Vegas
- Location: United States
- Leader: Annie Lobert
- Website: hookersforjesus.net

Hookers for Jesus is an evangelical Christian organization focused on human rights of people who work in the sex industry and fights sex trafficking.

== History ==
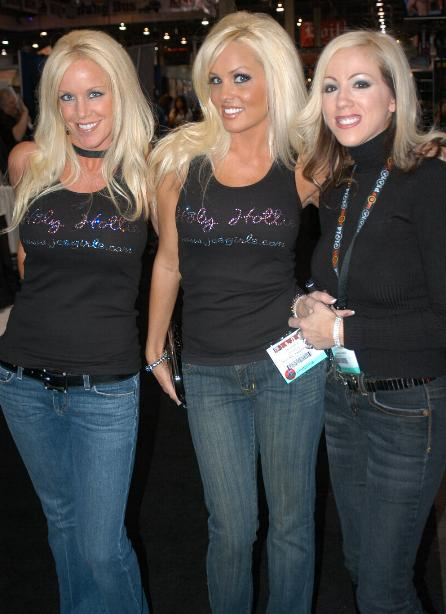
Lori Albee, Heather Veitch and Annie Lobert at the Adult Entertainment Expo in Las Vegas, 2007

The organization was founded in 2005 by Annie Lobert, a former sex worker turned Christian in Las Vegas. In 2007, she set up a safe house program ("Destiny House") at The Church at South Las Vegas, for victims of sex trafficking and sex workers. In 2008, she collaborated with Heather Veitch of JC's Girls at the AVN Adult Entertainment Expo in Las Vegas.

== Controversies ==
In 2020, the organization received widespread attention and criticism following a grant from the United States Department of Justice, due to the group's handbook of its safe house rules published in 2018 mentioning that homosexuality was immoral and that attendance at the organization's weekly church services was mandatory. Lobert replied that the manual no longer contained statements about homosexuality and that attendance at religious services was no longer mandatory.
