= Marcheline Bertrand =

American actress (1950–2007)

- Bertrand in 2001
- Born: Marcia Lynne Bertrand; May 9, 1950; Blue Island, Illinois, U.S.
- Died: January 27, 2007 (aged 56); Los Angeles, California, U.S.
- Occupations: Actress; producer; humanitarian
- Years active: 1981–1997
- Spouse: Jon Voight (m. 1971; div. 1980)
- Partner(s): Bill Day (1988–1990, 1992–1999); John Trudell (?–2007)
- Children: James Haven; Angelina Jolie

Marcia Lynne "Marcheline" Bertrand (May 9, 1950 – January 27, 2007) was an American actress. She was the mother of actress Angelina Jolie and actor James Haven and the former wife of actor Jon Voight.

== Early life ==
Bertrand was born in Blue Island, Illinois, the daughter of Lois June (née Gouwens) and Rolland F. Bertrand. She was of French-Canadian, Dutch and German descent. She had a younger sister, Debbie, and a younger brother, Raleigh. In 1965, Bertrand's family moved from the Chicago area to Beverly Hills, California, where she attended Beverly Hills High School from sophomore year until graduation.

== Film career ==
During her early years as an actress, Bertrand studied with Lee Strasberg. In 1971, she played Connie in the episode "Love, Peace, Brotherhood, and Murder" on the fourth season of the television show Ironside. A decade later, she appeared in a minor role in 1982's Lookin' to Get Out, a film co-written by and starring her former husband, Jon Voight. The following year, Bertrand played her final film role in the 1983 comedy The Man Who Loved Women, a remake of the 1977 French film of the same name.

Bertrand then turned her attention toward producing. In 1983, she founded Woods Road Productions with her then-partner, Bill Day. In 2005, Bertrand was the executive producer of the documentary Trudell, which chronicles the life and work of her partner, John Trudell, a Santee Sioux musician and activist. Trudell was an official selection at the Sundance Film Festival and the Tribeca Film Festival, and it won the Special Jury Prize for Best Documentary at the Seattle International Film Festival.

== Humanitarian work ==
Bertrand and her partner John Trudell founded the All Tribes Foundation to support the cultural and economic survival of Native peoples. By 2007, the foundation had issued over $800,000 in grants to reservation-based programs that strengthen tribal ways of life and safeguard a future for Native communities.

On International Women's Day in 2003, Bertrand and Trudell produced a benefit concert for Afghan women refugees in conjunction with the United Nations High Commissioner for Refugees.

Bertrand, who was diagnosed with ovarian cancer in 1999, also founded the Give Love Give Life organization with Trudell; their objective was to raise public consciousness about ovarian and other gynecological cancers through music. The first Give Love Give Life concert was held in February 2004 at The Roxy in West Hollywood. Bertrand and Trudell worked to organize strategic support in the music and film community for Johanna's Law, legislation to fund national outreach and education about the signs and symptoms of gynecological cancers, which was signed into law on January 12, 2007. To benefit the Women's Cancer Research Institute at Cedars-Sinai Medical Center, a second Give Love Give Life concert was held at the Gibson Amphitheater in Los Angeles in February 2007, a month after Bertrand died from cancer.

== Personal life ==
Bertrand married actor Jon Voight on December 12, 1971. Following a miscarriage in 1972, they had two children, James Haven and Angelina Jolie, who became actors. Bertrand and Voight separated in 1976, publicly citing Voight's adultery. Bertrand filed for divorce in 1978, which was finalized in 1980.

Following her legal separation from Voight, Bertrand began a relationship with documentary filmmaker Bill Day. They lived together for 11 years but never married. During her later life, Bertrand was in a relationship with activist and musician John Trudell.

At the time of her death, Bertrand had four grandchildren by her daughter. Another granddaughter, who was born the following year, was given the middle name "Marcheline" in her honor.

Bertrand was a Roman Catholic.

== Death ==
Toward the end of her life, Bertrand preferred her privacy and did not grant interviews. After eight years with ovarian and breast cancer, she died aged 56 on January 27, 2007, at Cedars-Sinai Medical Center, in the company of her children. Bertrand's mother and sister also died of cancer. Her daughter explained, "My grandmother also died young; so, my mother always thought it could happen to her."

== Filmography ==
| Title | Year | Role | Notes |
|---|---|---|---|
| Ironside | 1971 | Connie | TV series Episode: "Love, Peace, Brotherhood, and Murder" |
| Lookin' to Get Out | 1982 | Girl in Jeep | |
| The Man Who Loved Women | 1983 | Girl | (final film role) |
| Trudell | 2005 | —N/a | Documentary; Executive producer |
