= Bill Day (filmmaker) =

American documentary filmmaker (born 1959)

- Born: September 12, 1959 (age 66); New York City, U.S.
- Education: UCLA School of Theater, Film and Television
- Occupations: Filmmaker; YouTuber
- Employers: Discovery Channel; National Geographic Channel
- Known for: His hit series known as 'Real or Fake' where he uncovers photos and videos that people send him to see if they are real or fake.
- Notable work: Missionary Positions; The Pussycat Preacher; Real or Fake? (YouTube show)
- Partner: Marcheline Bertrand (1988–1990, 1992–1999)
- Children: 2

YouTube information
- Channel: billschannel
- Years active: 2009–present
- Genre: Travel vlog Knowledge
- Subscribers: 2.56 million
- Views: 1.01 billion
- Last updated: April 25, 2026

Bill Day (born September 12, 1959) is an American documentary filmmaker and YouTuber. Day worked for both the National Geographic Channel and Discovery Channel. For CNN, he produced a documentary film about the Osa Peninsula.

== Career ==
Day directed the documentary Saviors of the Forest which was shown at the Sundance Film Festival. He also directed Rubber Jungle, a behind the scenes look at the life of Brazilian labor leader Chico Mendes and the movie about his life.

In 2002, Day co-produced the musical documentary Under The Covers, followed by Alternative Rock and Roll Years in 2003 for Discovery Channel. Day served as a field producer for Hopkins 24/7, a television documentary series. With Carlo Gennarelli, he co-produced Ordinary Joe, a documentary film about Joe Sciacca, a Vietnam veteran from New York City. Day made a film about XXXchurch.com called Missionary Positions. He also produced and directed The Pussycat Preacher, a film about Heather Veitch and her organization, JC's Girls.

In 2024 Day published his first novel, Great Again, a book delving into the tangle of political polarization, immigration, and personal transformation in modern America.

He holds the YouTube channel 'billschannel', which posts videos of wildlife trips around the world and a series named 'Real or Fake?' This series shows him and his research group 'The Chewy Piranhas' uncover photographs and videos on the internet and using various methods to show whether they are portraying real-life events, fake hoaxes or unknown mysteries.

== Personal life ==
Day dated Marcheline Bertrand for a time and helped her raise Angelina Jolie and James Haven, whom she had with Jon Voight.
