= Naked Ambition: An R Rated Look at an X Rated Industry =

Naked Ambition: An R Rated Look at an X Rated Industry (film)
- Directed by: Michael Grecco
- Written by: Charles Holland
- Produced by: Charles Holland
- Narrated by: Michael Grecco
- Cinematography: Peter Blaha; Kevin González; Ken Kobre
- Edited by: Jeremy Troy
- Music by: Jens Funke; Josef Peters
- Production companies: KHG Productions; Lantern Lane Entertainment
- Distributed by: Lantern Lane Entertainment
- Release date: April 30, 2009 (United States)
- Running time: 81 minutes
- Country: United States
- Language: English

Naked Ambition: An R Rated Look at an X Rated Industry (book)
- Editor: Lonn Friend; Rob Hill
- Author: Michael Grecco; as photographer; Dave Navarro; Larry Flynt; (forewords)
- Language: English
- Genre: Photography; Sexuality
- Publisher: Rock Out Books
- Publication date: November 11, 2007
- Publication place: United States
- Media type: Print (hardcover)
- Pages: 224
- ISBN: 0-9793314-0-4
- OCLC: 190967572

Naked Ambition: An R Rated Look at an X Rated Industry is a 2009 American documentary film written by Charles Holland and directed by Michael Grecco based upon the Grecco's third portrait photography book by the same name.

In both the documentary and his book, Grecco sets out to capture the energy and spirit of the AVN Awards and convention where American pornography is displayed, celebrated, and honored.

== Film ==
A documentary based on the shooting for the book and directed by Michael Grecco premiered in April 2009. The film was a production by Lantern Lane Entertainment in association with KHG Documentary.

=== Partial cast ===
- Michael Grecco
- Tera Patrick
- Evan Seinfeld
- Heather Veitch
- Jesse Jane
- Paul Fishbein
- Sunny Lane
- Joanna Angel
- Nautica Thorn
- Rob Rotten
- Luc Wylder
- Alexandra Silk
- Janine Lindemulder
- Julia Ann
- Peter North
- Randy West
- Steve Hirsch
- Brittney Skye
- Greg Fitzsimmons
- Evan Stone
- Stormy Daniels
- Ron Jeremy
- Mary Carey
- Paul Thomas
- Jenna Jameson
- Larry Flynt
- Cytherea

== Book ==
Containing over 200 photographs of actors, filmmakers and personalities in the world of adult entertainment, it is published by Rock Out Books (ISBN 0979331404). Grecco photographed his subjects during the 2006 AVN Adult Entertainment Expo in Las Vegas, the convention which surrounds the annual AVN Awards. The book's forewords, written by rock musician Dave Navarro and Hustler magazine editor Larry Flynt, discuss modern culture's acceptance of pornography into the mainstream, which allows an overtly sexual work like this to be considered a coffee table book.

Included among the portrait subjects are Larry Flynt, Jenna Jameson, Ron Jeremy, Chi Chi LaRue, Tera Patrick, Alexandra Silk, Katsuni, Dana DeArmond, Sunny Lane, Kurt Lockwood, and Michelle Aston. Uncommon in pornography-related works, the photographs do not seem to have been altered with any significant image editing or photo manipulation, thus avoiding the layer of fantasy usually applied to actors in this field.

The book was edited by former RIP magazine editor Lonn Friend and former FHM editor Rob Hill.

=== Reception ===
Variety wrote "In contrast with Grecco’s evocative photos, his film is scattered and platitudinous, skimming the surface of his subjects and betraying his high-art aspirations with a shallow E! aesthetic. Reliable interest in the subject matter should land the film, which opens theatrically May 1, a home on an adventurous cabler, though such a contentious substratum of American culture deserves more thoughtful treatment."

The Hollywood Reporter wrote that "Grecco's book is filled with stunning portraits and nicely captures his subjects' personalities", but it was felt the film was too tame and seemed more an extended infomercial for the book.

DVD Verdict made note that Grecco appears to "play the pornography-as-free-speech card," in his depicting pornography as "just regular folks who express themselves through public fornication." The reviewer wrote "the fact that Grecco glosses over the negatives of a business rife with them makes his documentary disingenuous—and worse, boring." It was concluded "in the end, Naked Ambition is as dreary and pedestrian as its punny title. Consenting adults or not, Grecco's subjects are fringe players who doth protest way too much about the wonderfulness of the porn industry, but their rah-rah cheerleading in support of it is more sorry than celebratory."
