= Barry Voight =

American geologist (born 1937)

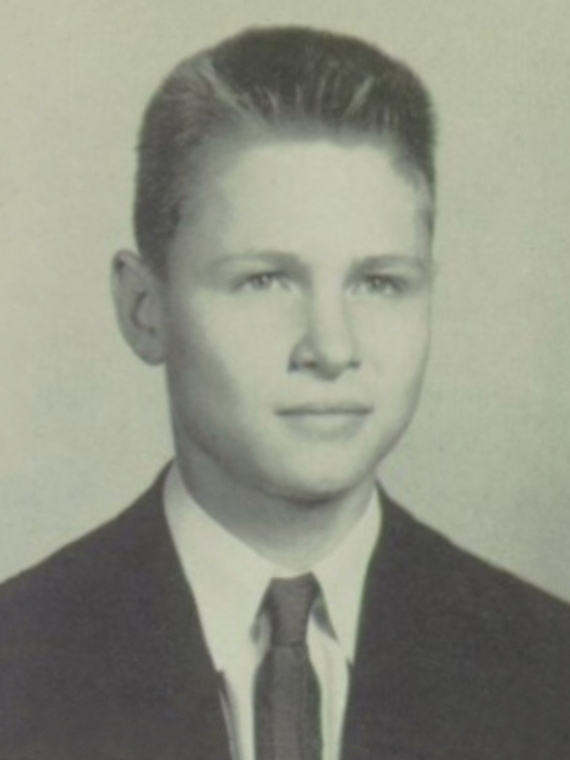
- Voight in 1955
- Born: 1937 (age 88–89); United States
- Education: University of Notre Dame; Columbia University
- Spouse: Mary Anne Verdisco
- Children: 2
- Relatives: Jon Voight (brother); Chip Taylor (brother); James Haven (nephew); Angelina Jolie (niece)
- Scientific career
- Fields: Volcanology, engineering
- Workplaces: Pennsylvania State University

Barry Voight (/vɔɪt/ VOYT; born 1937) is an American geologist, volcanologist, author, and engineer. After earning his PhD at Columbia University, Voight worked as a professor of geology at several universities, including Pennsylvania State University, where he taught from 1964 until his retirement in 2005. He remains an emeritus professor there and still conducts research, focusing on rock mechanics, plate tectonics, disaster prevention, and geotechnical engineering.

In April 1980, Voight's publications on landslides, avalanches, and other mass movements attracted the attention of Rocky Crandell of the United States Geological Survey (USGS), who asked him to look at a growing bulge on the Mount St. Helens volcano in the state of Washington. Voight foresaw the collapse of the mountain's north flank as well as a powerful eruption. His predictions came true when St. Helens erupted in May 1980; Voight was then hired by the USGS to investigate the debris avalanche that initiated the eruption. After his work at Mount St. Helens brought him international recognition, Voight continued researching and guiding monitoring efforts at several active volcanoes throughout his career, including Nevado del Ruiz in Colombia, Mount Merapi in Indonesia, and Soufrière Hills, a volcano on the Caribbean island of Montserrat. For his research, publications, and disaster prevention work as a volcanologist and engineer, Voight has been honored with numerous awards, appointments, and medals.

== Personal life and education ==
Born in 1937, Voight grew up in Yonkers, New York. His brothers are actor Jon Voight and songwriter Chip Taylor, actress Angelina Jolie is his niece, and musician James Haven is his nephew. Barry and his wife Mary Anne (née Verdisco) have two daughters, Lisa and Barbara. Voight's father was professional golf player Elmer "Elmo" Voight, a leader in the effort to break the color barrier in golf, and his mother Barbara was a teacher and swim instructor. Voight and his brothers grew up playing golf, and Barry also developed an interest in swimming.

Voight graduated from Archbishop Stepinac High School in 1955. After high school, Voight pursued a 5-year intensive dual-degree program at the University of Notre Dame, studying landslips along Lake Michigan and receiving undergraduate degrees in geology in 1959 and in civil engineering in 1960. He earned his master's degree in civil engineering from Notre Dame in 1961. Voight attributes his interest in science to his mentors at Notre Dame, professors Ray Gutschick and Erhard Winkler. After spending one year studying at Cornell University, Voight transferred to Columbia University, where he graduated with a PhD in geology in 1965, studying rock mechanics and structural geology under Fred Donath. While at Columbia, Voight was named a President's Fellow, and taught a lecture course called "Geology for Engineers".

== Teaching career ==
Voight began teaching in 1961, serving as a teaching assistant at the University of Notre Dame while pursuing his master's degree in civil engineering. From 1961 to 1963, he served as a teaching assistant at Cornell and Columbia. In 1964, he joined the faculty at Pennsylvania State University (Penn State) as an assistant professor of geology, becoming a full professor of geology and geotechnical engineering in 1978. Voight taught at Penn State for more than four decades, retiring from teaching in June 2005 but continuing his research.

While at Penn State, Voight had a joint affiliation with the school's Department of Mineral Engineering and taught courses in physical geology, mechanics of geological materials, and volcanology. During his career, he also lectured as a guest professor at the Delft University of Technology in the Netherlands in 1972, working under Jacques Dozy, and served as a visiting professor at the University of Toronto in 1973 and at the University of California, Santa Barbara, in 1981. Still an emeritus professor at Penn State, he initiated an endowment under his name to contribute to the education of volcanic hazard specialists from developing countries.

== Volcanological work and research ==
=== Early assignments ===
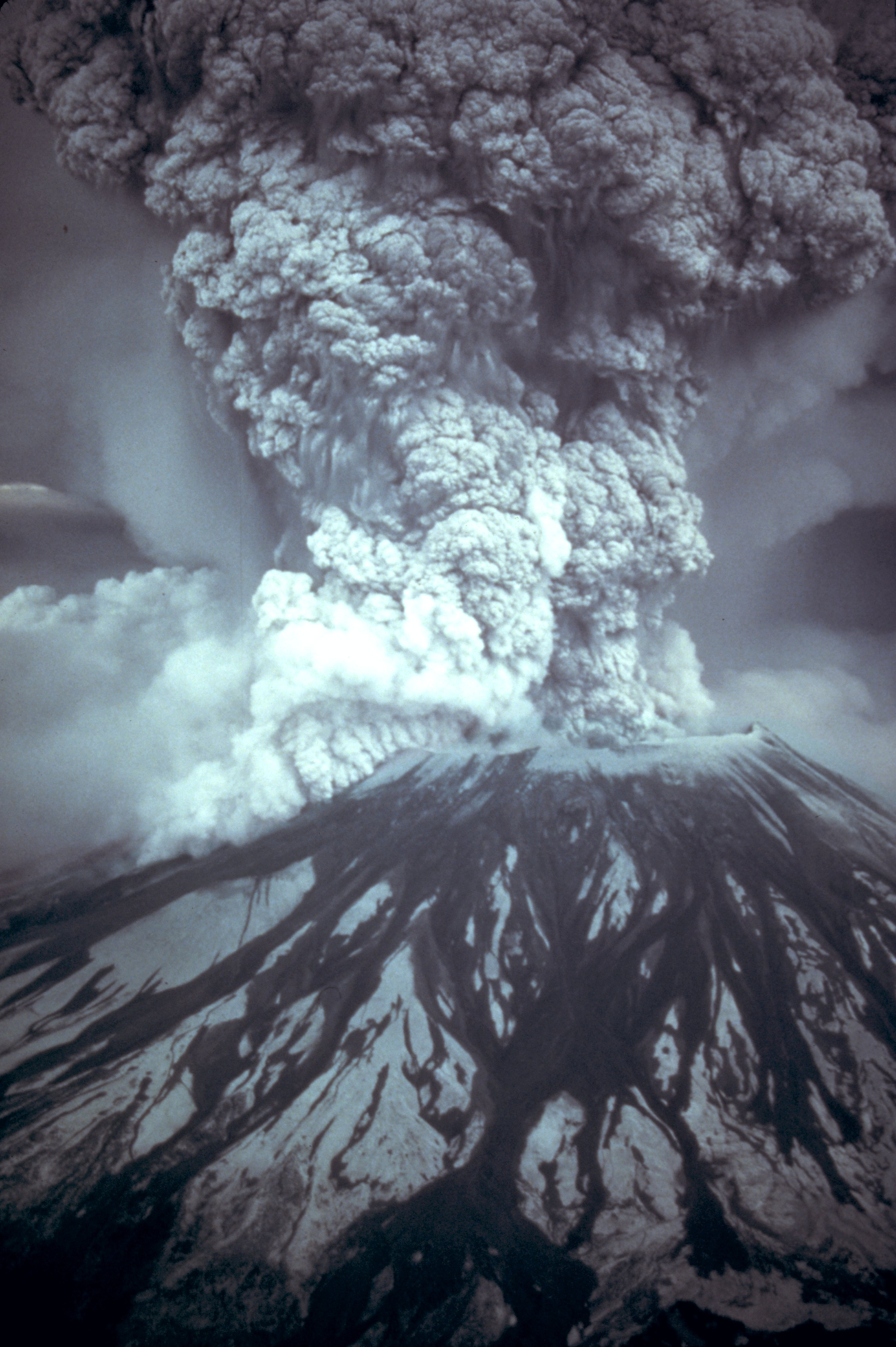
Voight correctly predicted a bulge collapse that caused Mount St. Helens to erupt on May 18, 1980.

Voight performed work in 1971–1973 for the United States Bureau of Mines. In 1978, he published the first volume of a treatise on avalanches, titled Rockslides and Avalanches. After the second volume was released in 1980, the work became a benchmark in studying avalanches and other forms of mass movement.

A month prior to the 1980 eruption of Mount St. Helens, Voight was contacted by Rocky Crandell, a United States Geological Survey (USGS) employee working in the Vancouver office near the mountain. Crandell sought Voight's expertise in landslides, hoping Voight would opine on a growing bulge, 270 feet (82 m) long, which had emerged on the mountain's north face. In his reporting to Crandell and his associates, Voight said that the bulge could fail and collapse the volcano's entire north sector. He suggested they begin monitoring the rate of movement of the bulge, worried that the collapse could trigger an eruption. He also advised hiring a local surveyor to take measurements, offending several of the geologists. Shortly after, Voight left the mountain and returned to teaching classes at Penn State. Before the eruption, he had sent his full report to the USGS, summarizing his predictions, depicting the failure of the bulge and the collapse of the mountain's north side followed by a violent eruption. After a magnitude 5.1 earthquake centered directly below the north slope caused that part of the volcano to slide, Mount St. Helens erupted, causing $1.1 billion in damage and killing 57 people.

After the eruption, Voight accepted a position as a consultant for the USGS. He led the investigation into the volcano debris avalanche which had occurred during the eruption, guiding other volcanologists including Harry Glicken, who built upon Voight's preliminary research to create his report "Rockslide-Debris Avalanche of May 18, 1980, Mount St. Helens Volcano, Washington" (1996). Voight's work won him international renown, and he later cited his experiences there as "career-changing". Although Voight already had a burgeoning interest in volcanology, the eruption at Mount St. Helens propelled him to dedicate himself to the field. His work helped reinvigorate widespread interest in landslides and other phenomena at volcanoes that potentially pose a threat to life. After completing his research at Mount St. Helens, Voight began analyzing the volcanic hazards from several other active volcanoes.

In 1985, Voight blamed human error for the Armero tragedy in Colombia, where more than 23,000 died from an eruption from the Nevado del Ruiz volcano. He stated that while categorically accurate predictions of volcanic eruptions were impossible, unpreparedness for the disaster exacerbated the death toll. In January 1986, Voight visited Nevado del Ruiz responding to concerns from the Colombian government that the northeastern section of the volcano might cave in, causing another eruption. He established a monitoring network of reflectors and used laser ranging to track how the distances to these reflectors changed over time.

When one reflector indicated significant movement, and large cracks became visible from the air, Voight contemplated initiating an evacuation, but waited. By March 1986, he realized the widening cracks were caused by the creep, or gradual shifting, of one of the volcano's glaciers, rather than rock movement. After leaving Colombia, Voight compiled the 14-page report "Countdown to Catastrophe" (1988), which analyzed how volcanic hazard management had failed at Armero.

=== Later studies ===
When Voight began research at Mount Merapi in Java, Indonesia, in 1988, it was largely unknown to volcanologists. It had been omitted in the Smithsonian Institution's 1981 publication Volcanoes of the World, despite being densely populated, having close to a million people on its slopes as of 1996. Voight set up meters to record movement within the volcano, and educated local scientists on volcanic monitoring. In July 1989, he obtained a $250,000 grant from the National Science Foundation's Division of Natural and Manmade Hazard Mitigation for his proposal to predict eruptions at Merapi.

After his funding ran out, he temporarily abandoned his research. An eruption from the volcano in 1994 produced pyroclastic flows that killed 63 people, including guests at a wedding ceremony. Returning to Merapi the following year, Voight compared data from the dead and survivors, including the extent of their burn areas, clothing worn, and lung damage. He concluded that protective, long-sleeved clothing and masks enhance chances of survival when exposed to eruptive activity.

In April 1989, Voight returned to Colombia to the volcano Galeras after being contacted by the United Nations Disaster Relief Organization. People in Pasto, located at the foot of the volcano, had become alarmed by noises and shaking from Galeras. While Galeras proved far easier to climb than Nevado del Ruiz, land mines planted to hinder guerrilla forces dotted the slopes of the mountain. With USGS geologist Dick Janda, Voight drew a hazard map that included several populated areas within the danger zone. Before Voight left Galeras, the volcano underwent an unexpected phreatic eruption, which Voight and his team failed to predict.

Although Pasto was unaffected, six scientists attending a United Nations workshop for natural disaster relief were killed. After reviewing deformation data from the day before the eruption, Voight discovered that no acceleration in the deformation process had occurred. He surmised that phreatic eruptions do not exhibit an acceleration in deformation before taking place and left after confirming that the volcano's monitoring system functioned properly.

In the early 1990s, Voight performed volcanic hazard assessments at Cotopaxi in Ecuador and at Nevado del Huila in Colombia, where his research was impeded by guerrilla factions and drug cartel operations. He also assisted with assessment activity at Mount Pinatubo in the Philippines, Mount Redoubt in the United States, Mount Bandai, Mount Unzen, and Mount Ontake in Japan, and Bezymianny and Shiveluch in the Kamchatka Peninsula, Russia.

Voight's successful prediction that an avalanche at St. Helens could provoke a lateral eruption, an eruption from the volcano's flank rather than its summit, attracted the attention of the government of Montserrat in March 1996. Worried about an expanding lava dome at the Soufrière Hills volcano, the island's government asked Voight to assess its potential for an avalanche that could generate an eruption. Voight thought it was unlikely that the crater would collapse, but expressed concern over a possible pyroclastic flow that could reach the city of Plymouth in approximately three minutes. The city and a village on the mountain were evacuated, and within three years, pyroclastic flows overtook the abandoned sites.

Following these eruptions, Voight served as a member of the Risk Assessment Panel that advised Montserrat's government, and he co-established the Caribbean Andesite Lava Island Precision Seismo-geodetic Observatory (CALIPSO) with a team of international scientists. He continued research at the island with Steven Sparks, a geoscientist at the University of Bristol, establishing the SEA-CALIPSO system to analyze Soufrière Hills by using seismic waves and explosions in the ocean. Among other findings, this effort detected a major fault trending north-to-west under Montserrat's western side. Voight still oversees hazard assessments at the volcano, providing his input during eruptive periods in 2006 and 2010.

With his students, Voight has analyzed pyroclastic flows, volcanically induced seismicity, volcanic debris avalanches, and volcanic eruption prediction. Voight has also served as a consultant geotechnical engineer for dams, tunnels, and nuclear power plants, helping plan engineering projects in France, India, Ireland, Somalia, Papua New Guinea, Canada, and Turkey, as well as in the United States. Voight's research interests in lava dome collapses, stratovolcanoes, monitoring of active volcanoes, and pyroclastic flows have brought him to Iceland, Indonesia, the West Indies, Italy, and Chile.

Combining his knowledge of engineering and geological concepts, Voight developed the widely used anelastic strain recovery (ASR) method for measuring stress on deep rock. With a team of geologists, he also derived the material failure forecast method (FFM), which predicts eruption times for volcanoes based on changes in the mountain's surrounding seismic and deformation data. He currently serves as a member of the United States Geological Survey's Volcano Hazards Response Team, and has responded to potentially eruptive volcanoes in Japan, the Philippines, Indonesia, and Chile.

== Recognition and legacy ==
Throughout his career, Voight has received multiple accolades and citations for his research as a professor and for his professional work as a geologist and volcanologist. In 1984, the Institution of Civil Engineers awarded him the George Stephenson Medal, recognizing one of his articles as among "the best work published in [their] journals".

The same year, Voight earned an award for "significant original contribution to research in rock mechanics" from the United States National Committee on Rock Mechanics. For his help monitoring the Mayon Volcano in the Philippines in 1985, he was granted a key to Legazpi, Albay, which had been threatened by Mayon's impending eruption. 1989 saw another major year of honors for Voight, as he was named a MacQuarie Research Scholar and again garnered an award from the United States National Committee on Rock Mechanics for his original findings. Voight has appeared as a distinguished lecturer several times, including at the University of Utah's College of Mining Engineering (1990), the University of California, Santa Barbara (1992), and the Association of Environmental & Engineering Geologists (1992).

For his service as a professor at Penn State, Voight has been given two awards, specifically for his research. In 1990, he received the Wilson Research Award from the College of Earth and Mineral Sciences for excellence in research. In 1991, he gained a Faculty Scholar Medal for "Outstanding Achievement in the Physical Sciences and Engineering". In 2008, Voight was appointed a Union Fellow of the American Geophysical Union for "fundamental contributions to the understanding of volcano deformation, assessment of volcano hazards, and forecasting", and the following year, he was awarded the Schuster Medal by the Canadian Geotechnical Society for "outstanding achievements in research on geologic hazards in North America". For "his research, teaching and consulting work", the Engineering Geology Division of the Geological Society of America presented him with their 2010 Distinguished Practice Award.

Voight received the Thorarinsson Medal of the International Association of Volcanology and Chemistry of the Earth's Interior in 2013, granted to a "scientist of outstanding distinction who has made fundamental contributions to research in volcanology", and in 2017 he was elected as a Member of the National Academy of Engineering for "contributions to the understanding, management, and mitigation of geologic hazards."

Recalling a conference where Voight appeared, Bill McGuire, Emeritus Professor of Geophysical & Climate Hazards at University College London, described him as "an illustrious expert on volcano instability and landslides".

Citing Voight for his Distinguished Practice Award, colleague Richard Gray named him among his "profession's brightest and productive members". When Voight published his failure forecast prediction mechanism, USGS geologist Robert I. Tilling praised it as "a significant refinement in the interpretation of monitoring data".

== Publications ==
According to Voight's curriculum vitae from Pennsylvania State University, he has published more than 400 papers or abstracts and edited 15 books. According to his Google Scholar profile, he continues to publish articles, and his works have been cited more than 13,000 times. In addition to journal articles, Voight has written or helped write at least 21 books and monographs since 1965; his co-authors include R.S.J. Sparks, A. Neri, D. Elsworth, A. Belousov, and G. Mattioli. His most recent book, The Eruption of Soufrière Hills Volcano, Montserrat from 2000 to 2010, was published in 2014.
