= Elizabeth Waterman =

American photographer

- Born: March 1, 1985 (age 41); Taos, New Mexico, United States
- Education: University of Southern California
- Known for: Photography
- Website: elizabethwaterman.com

Elizabeth Waterman is a Los Angeles–based artist working with performance, portraiture, and constructed image systems. Her practice engages dancers, performers, and subcultural spaces through staged and observational photography. Her work has been exhibited internationally, including New York City, London, Paris, Sydney, and Los Angeles, and has appeared in The Los Angeles Times, British Journal of Photography, and L’Oeil de la Photographie.

== Early life and education ==
Elizabeth was born in Taos, New Mexico, United States. She earned her BA in Fine Art at the University of Southern California.

== Career ==
Elizabeth's books include Moneygame (XYZ Books, 2021), a study of exotic dancers across five U.S. cities, and Candyland (Unicorn Publishing, 2024), a series of outdoor portraits of female adult film actors.

In October 2022, Waterman did a solo exhibition at Boogie Wall, an all-female focused gallery in London, featuring pictures from her book Moneygame.

In 2023, Waterman held several solo exhibitions, including Gorgeous Drag in Albumen Gallery in London, MONEYGAME in Leica Gallery in Los Angeles and Anderson Yezerski Gallery in Boston.

In December 2022, she released a photo series called "Women of the Sidewalk Project", in partnership with non-profit organization The Sidewalk Project. As a part of the holiday season, they released 12 days of portrait photos of transgender women living on the Los Angeles streets.

In 2025, her series Propulsion was exhibited at Photo London through Albumen Gallery. The work examines similarities between human and marine movement.

== Publications ==
=== Books ===
- Moneygame, 2021. ISBN 9789895318209
- Candyland, 2024. ISBN 9781916846425

== Awards and recognition ==
- Prix de la Photographie (PX3) 2020; Honorable Mention in Fine Art/People
- British Journal of Photography, Portrait of Humanity Book, Publication, May 2019
- Prix de la Photographie (PX3) 2018; Gold Winner in the Documentary Category, Silver Winner in the People Category, and Honorable Mention

== Personal life ==
She is married to an American photographer, film director and author Michael Grecco. The couple lives in Los Angeles, United States.
