= Sandals Church =

Coordinates: 34°0′15″N 117°18′41″W

- Sandals Church
- Location: Riverside, California
- Country: United States
- Denomination: Baptist
- Churchmanship: Evangelical
- Website: sandalschurch.com

History
- Founded: 1997

Sandals Church is a Baptist multi-site church based in Riverside, California. It is affiliated with the Southern Baptist Convention.

== History ==
It was founded by Pastor Matt Brown and his wife, Tammy, in 1997.

For the first 13 years of its existence, Sandals Church met in various locations throughout Riverside, CA, the longest of which was at the gym at California Baptist University. In 2010, Sandals Church purchased and moved to its own property at 150 Palmyrita Avenue in Riverside. In 2012, Sandals Church launched its second campus in the Woodcrest area of Riverside. Sandals Church has campuses established campuses in Moreno Valley, East Valley, Hunter Park, Downtown Riverside (Palm Ave Campus), San Bernardino, Banning, Woodcrest, Lake Arrowhead, Menifee, Eastvale, and Fresno.

According to a church census released in 2023, it claimed a weekly attendance of 11,000 people and 15 campuses in different cities.

== JC's Girls ==
Heather Veitch, a former stripper, was attending Sandals Church’s when it founded JC's Girls with the help of Matt Brown in 2005.
