= Adult entertainment (disambiguation) =

Adult entertainment may refer to:

- the activity of the sex industry
- Adult Entertainment (album) by Raffi, 1977
- AVN Adult Entertainment Expo, annual convention in Nevada, U.S.

== See also ==
- Adult contemporary
