= Valérie Bonnier =

French actress

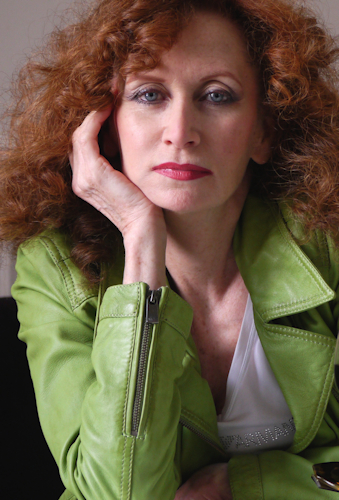
Valerie Bonnier

Valérie Bonnier (born 13 October 1950 in Sainte-Colombe, Rhône, dead 2 March 2020 in Paris) was a French actress, screenwriter and novel writer who played Fabienne in the 1977 film The Man Who Loved Women. She writes for theatre, TV, radio, cinema, and novels.

Novelist :

- Toutes les rousses ne sont pas des sorcières - Éditions du Rocher, 2007
- Toutes les blondes ne sont pas des anges - Éditions du Rocher, 2008
- Toutes les rousses ne sont pas des tigresses - Éditions du Rocher, 2009
- 10 histoires d'amour, nouvelles - Éditions Val & Paul, e-book, 2013
- L'homme idéal s'appelle Paul - Éditions Val & Paul, e-book, 2013
- Confidences érotiques d'une courtisane - Éditions France Empire, 2014

Theatre writer : L'escapade - Éditions Arts et Comédie, 2012

Radio writer : 27 radio plays and 4 news, France-Inter

Cinema writer : Il y a des jours et des lunes - Claude Lelouch, 1990

TV writer : IMDb

website : Personal website
