= Michel Fermaud =

French author, dialoguist, film director, and screenwriter (1921–2007)

- Born: 6 September 1921; Bordeaux, France
- Died: 7 June 2007 (aged 85); Saint-Jean-de-Luz, France

Michel Jean Roger Edouard Fermaud (6 September 1921 – 7 June 2007) was a French author, dialoguist, film director, and screenwriter.

== Filmography (selection) ==
- 1960 Les portes claquent, co director with Jacques Poitrenaud
- 1977 L'Homme qui aimait les femmes by François Truffaut (co screenwriter)
- 1983 The Man Who Loved Women by Blake Edwards, original script
- 1983 Vous habitez chez vos parents ?, (director)
