= The Man Who Loved Women (1983 film) =

1983 film by Blake Edwards

- Theatrical release poster
- Directed by: Blake Edwards
- Screenplay by: Blake Edwards; Milton Wexler; Geoffrey Edwards
- Based on: The Man Who Loved Women; 1977 film by Michel Fermaud; Suzanne Schiffman; François Truffaut
- Produced by: Tony Adams; Blake Edwards
- Starring: Burt Reynolds; Julie Andrews; Kim Basinger
- Cinematography: Haskell Wexler
- Edited by: Ralph E. Winters
- Music by: Henry Mancini
- Distributed by: Columbia Pictures
- Release date: December 16, 1983
- Running time: 110 minutes
- Country: United States
- Language: English
- Budget: $12 million or $19 million
- Box office: $10,964,231

The Man Who Loved Women is a 1983 American comedy film directed by Blake Edwards and starring Burt Reynolds, Julie Andrews and Kim Basinger. It is a remake of the 1977 François Truffaut's film L'Homme qui aimait les femmes.

It chronicles the affairs of artist David Fowler, as told from the perspective of his analyst and eventual lover Dr. Marianna Solari. She chronicles his obsessive love of women, which leads to his eventual death.

== Plot ==
Mourners attended the funeral of David Fowler, a successful sculptor, including his psychiatrist Dr. Marianna Solari. Before his death, David had an active romantic history with numerous women which left him socially, artistically, and sexually impotent. During his first therapy session, David recalls seeing a woman's legs through the window as she walks down the street. He follows her and fakes a hit-and-run accident. When he returns home, David is told the woman is Agnes Chapman. He meets Agnes at a gas station and gives her his phone number. Smitten with her, David stalks Agnes at her aerobics class. Later that evening, the two sleep together.

David remembers his first romantic dalliance with Darla, a prostitute, at age 15. He also remembers his mother, who was regularly absent as she slept with various men. During one rainy night, David picks up Nancy, another prostitute whom he meets on the street, and takes her to his residence. There, he decides not to sleep with her but pays her $200 to stay with him for the night. When David's session with Marianna is over, she analyzes David has a dilemma with his decision-making.

In Houston, David unveils his latest sculpture. There, he meets Louise, the wife of Texas millionaire Roy Carr; she takes David to her penthouse where the two briefly have sex. The two continue their sexual affair privately in several public places. One evening after a horse race, David and Louise return to the penthouse, where Louise confesses her love towards him. Believing Roy to be away on a business meeting, Louise is startled when her husband abruptly returns with a new pet dog Simba. Meanwhile, David hides in a closet. While Roy is showering, David escapes and drives off in a Rolls-Royce with his hand glued to Simba and his boots glued to the carpet.

After David leaves Houston, he is left creatively impotent. Shortly after, he learns Louise has been charged with attempted murder after shooting Roy, who had found out about her affair. During his subsequent therapy session, an earthquake occurs and David becomes romantically interested in Marianna. However, he relates subsequent dalliances with a brunette, Courtney Wade, and Sue, a college student seeking work as a babysitter. Marianna sees her own doctor Simon Abrams, who insists she cease her romantic relationship with David. Concurrently, David resumes his affair with Louise after she has been released.

David ultimately falls in love with Marianna, whom he proposes to marry him. She declines however. Sometime later, Marianna recommends another therapist to David as she flies overseas to see her stepson. Feeling dejected, David sees Agnes again, but learns she is engaged. Months pass, and David meets Janet while she is Christmas shopping. David then sees another woman's legs. He tries to follow her, and is hit by an oncoming car. At a hospital, David is in recovery but decides to jump out of a window, killing himself. All his past lovers, including Marianna, mourn his death in the waiting room, and later at his gravesite.

== Cast ==
- Burt Reynolds as David Fowler
  - Tony Brown as 16 year old David Fowler
  - Philip Alexander as 12 year old David Fowler
  - Jonathan Rogal as 8 year old David Fowler
- Julie Andrews as Dr. Marianna Solari
- Kim Basinger as Louise Carr
- Marilu Henner as Agnes Chapman
- Cynthia Sikes as Courtney Wade
- Jennifer Edwards as Nancy
- Sela Ward as Janet Wainwright
- Ellen Bauer as Svetlana
- Denise Crosby as Enid
- Tracy Vaccaro as Legs
- Barry Corbin as Roy Carr
- Shelley Manne as Drummer
- Don Menza as Saxophonist
- Jimmy Rowles as Pianist
- Andy Simpkins as Bassist
- Jill Carroll as Sue
- Regis Philbin as Himself
- Joseph Bernard as Dr. Simon Abrams
- Roger Rose as Sergeant Stone
- Jennifer Ashley as Mrs. Fowler
- Cindi Dietrich as Darla
- Noni White as Clerk
- Marcheline Bertrand as Girl
- Ola Ray as Girl
- Ellyn Stern as Girl
- Sondra Theodore as Girl

== Production ==
In September 1982, Blake Edwards announced that he would direct a remake of The Man Who Loved Women with Warren Beatty. Dustin Hoffman had reportedly turned down the lead role. Eventually, Beatty dropped out. In December 1982, Burt Reynolds signed to star. Edwards wrote the script with Milton Wexler, his therapist. Wexler had analysed Edwards's scripts for years, especially 10. "I said if we could come up with something good and startling we'd do one together," said Edwards. There were a number of American remakes of French films at the time; others included Buddy, Buddy, The Toy, Breathless and Blame It on Rio.

Filming started in March 1983. A scene was improvised between Reynolds and Julie Andrews, playing Reynolds's character David Fowler's therapist Dr. Marianna Solari. Unbeknownst to Reynolds, Andrews wore an earpiece and received advice from Wexler as she asked questions to Reynolds. "Burt came to me and asked me if it was valid for this character to want children," said Edwards. "I said it was. Burt said he had been longing to have a family. We set up three cameras and asked Burt why he wanted to have children. He said he had been thinking about adopting a child. And that led to the scene. It was fascinating. Burt shifts in and out of the character several times." But it was not used because "It's too real. It almost makes you uncomfortable. It's so emotional, so poignant."

=== New Ending ===
Columbia, which financed the film, was dissatisfied with the film's ending, concerned that it might be too bleak. They requested that Edwards consider shooting a new one. Edwards had endured painful experiences with Hollywood studios in the past — he immortalised them in his film, S.O.B. — but because the relationship with Columbia had been good, he agreed. "Burt was against it and technically I didn't have to but it had been a good experience up until then and I wanted to be co-operative."

Five months after filming ended and one month before it was to be released, Edwards reshot the ending. The scene did not involve Reynolds, but some of his conquests, including those played by Andrews, Marilu Henner and Kim Basinger. This was done to make the film less bleak. The extra scene was shot over two days.

The new ending was screen-tested, and reports were positive. However, the two different endings were both screened December 3 in some "controlled research screenings", and the original ending was strongly preferred. Columbia decided to release the original ending. "Trying to read the research is not always an exact science," said Columbia's head of production, Guy McElwaine.

== Reception ==
In the United States, the film opened at number 10, and went on to gross $10,964,231 (equivalent to $35,443,000 in 2025).

Roger Ebert of the Chicago Sun-Times gave the film two stars out of four, and called it "a sad movie with a funny movie inside trying to get out".

Vincent Canby of The New York Times wrote, "It takes an inordinate amount of time to build up momentum, but once it does, The Man Who Loved Women, Blake Edwards' 'Americanization' of François Truffaut's 1977 French comedy, skates successfully over thin ice."

Variety wrote, "The Man Who Loved Women may do for Burt Reynolds' girl-chases films about what Stroker Ace did for his car-chase films, that is to say, not much. 'Women' is truly woeful, reeking of production-line, big star filmmaking and nothing else ... there's an unpleasant feeling for about an hour that this film is never going to get started, followed for another 50 minutes by the equally unpleasant feeling that it may never end."

Gene Siskel of the Chicago Tribune gave the film three stars out of four, and wrote that "Edwards' script doesn't seem to be able to make up its mind whether it wants to be serious or not. But after the film's comic high point—a funny scene involving the Texas oilman, his wife, their little dog, two piece of carpet and a tube of Crazy Glue—The Man Who Loved Women settles down and views David at a clinical distance with a strangely affecting compassion."

Kevin Thomas of the Los Angeles Times wrote that Reynolds "is stuck having to play a character so totally self-absorbed that it's impossible to care about him. As a result, what was minor but admirable in the Truffaut work has been transformed by Edwards and his co-writers Milton Wexler and Geoffrey Edwards into a major bore."

Gary Arnold of The Washington Post wrote, "Derived from one of François Truffaut's least satisfying movies, the Blake Edwards remake of The Man Who Loved Women,' now at area theaters, always loomed as some kind of fiasco. The only surprise is that Edwards and his hapless associates, particularly costars Burt Reynolds and Julie Andrews, have adapted the prototype with such suicidal fidelity."

On review aggregator website, Rotten Tomatoes, the film has an approval rating of 23%, based on 13 reviews, with an average score of 4.6/10.

== Follow up ==
Edwards and Reynolds enjoyed working together, and initially planned to do a remake of the Laurel and Hardy short, The Music Box, with Richard Pryor. Pryor backed out, and instead, Edwards and Reynolds teamed on City Heat, although Edwards would leave the project.
