= Sarah Sumner =

- Education: Baylor University; Wheaton College; Azusa Pacific University; Trinity Evangelical Divinity School, Kennedy School of Government at Harvard University
- Occupation: President of Right On Mission
- Notable work: Men and Women in the Church, IVP 2003 Leadership Above the Line, Tyndale 2006 Angry Like Jesus: Using His Example To Spark Your Moral Courage, Fortress 2015, Just How Married Do You Want To Be?, IVP 2008
- Theological work
- Main interests: Integrity in the Church and Christian Higher Education

Sarah Sumner is a Christian egalitarian theologian based in the US. She is also an author, and is know for her articles and books on Christian women in leadership, godly anger, leadership, seminary education, and marriage. Sumner serves as the President of Right On Mission.

Regarding the debate on women in the church, Sumner is an evangelical theologian. who is working to build consensus in Christian Leadership. Sumner does not advocate for the ordination of women in Protestant churches.

== Biography ==
Sumner graduated with a Bachelor of Education from Baylor University, a Master of Theology from Wheaton College, and a Master of Business Administration from Azusa Pacific University. She graduated from Trinity Evangelical Divinity School with a Ph.D. in systematic theology, and was the first woman to do so.

Sumner started her career as a National Sales Representative for InterVarsity Press. Following this, she joined the staff at Willow Creek Community Church in South Barrington, Illinois, as an evangelist.

Sumner served as a core teaching pastor at New Song Church in San Dimas, California.

Sumner then became an associate professor of ministry and theology at Azusa Pacific. She went on to become chair of the graduate ministry department at APU. It was at this time that she published her first book.

She has also taught as an adjunct professor at Trinity Law School in Santa Ana, California. In May 2011, Sumner was Trinity's Commencement Speaker for the Class of 2011.

Sumner served as dean of A.W. Tozer Theological Seminary at Simpson University in Redding, California from 2010 to 2012.

In 2012, Sumner became President of ‘’Right On Mission’’, a position she has held for over 10 years. The mission’s vision is “to see all Christians faithfully live “on mission” instead of veering “off mission.” ”. It sees itself as an educational entity, and offers ways to support Christians to “learn to think so Christianly that they find the moral courage to act with integrity as Christ followers, even in the face of opposition”.

== Books ==
Sumner has published four books:

- Men and Women in the Church, IVP 2003.
- Leadership Above the Line, Tyndale, 2006.
- Just How Married Do You Want To Be? IVP, 2008.
- Angry Like Jesus: Using His Example To Spark Your Moral Courage Fortress Press, 2015.

== Bibliography ==
- Eastman, Natalie R. Wilson (2014). Women, Leadership, and the Bible: How Do I Know What to Believe?. Wipf and Stock. ISBN 978-1608999132.
- Fincher, Dale; Jonalyn Fincher (2010). Coffee Shop Conversations: Making the Most of Spiritual Small Talk. Zondervan. ISBN 978-0310395652.
- Grudem, Wayne A. (2006). Evangelical Feminism: A New Path to Liberalism?. Good News Publishers. ISBN 1433518228.
- Kullberg, Kelly Monroe; Lael F. Arrington (2008). A Faith and Culture Devotional: Daily Readings on Art, Science, and Life. Zondervan. ISBN 978-0310283560.
- Williamson, Peter S. (2009). Ephesians. Baker Publishing Group. ISBN 978-1441206718.
