= James Haven =

American actor (born 1973)

- Born: James Haven Voight; May 11, 1973 (age 53); Los Angeles, California, U.S.
- Other name: Jamie Haven
- Education: USC School of Cinema-Television
- Occupation: Actor
- Years active: 1998–2013
- Spouse: Romi Imbelli (m. 2024; ann. 2024)
- Parents: Jon Voight (father); Marcheline Bertrand (mother)
- Relatives: Angelina Jolie (sister); Barry Voight (uncle); Chip Taylor (uncle)

James Haven (born James Haven Voight, May 11, 1973) is an American former actor. He is the son of actors Jon Voight and Marcheline Bertrand, and the older brother of actress Angelina Jolie.

== Early life and education ==
Haven was born in Los Angeles to actors Jon Voight and Marcheline Bertrand. He is the elder of two children; he has a sister, Angelina Jolie, two years younger, who became an actress. The singer-songwriter Chip Taylor and the geologist and volcanologist Barry Voight are his uncles. On his father's side, Haven is of German and Slovak descent. On his mother's side, he is of French-Canadian, Dutch, Polish, and German ancestry.

After their parents' separation in 1976, Haven and his sister grew up living with their mother. They were Catholic. Bertrand moved with them to Palisades, New York, giving up acting. A decade later when Haven was 13, the family returned to Los Angeles, where he attended Beverly Hills High School. After graduation, he enrolled at the USC School of Cinema-Television. While at the University of Southern California, he received the George Lucas Award for a student film he directed, which starred his sister.

== Career ==
Haven began his professional acting career in 1998. He had minor roles in several films starring his sister, Angelina Jolie, namely Gia (1998), Hell's Kitchen (1998), and Original Sin (2001). He also appeared in Monster's Ball (2001), which starred his sister's then-husband, Billy Bob Thornton. Haven was in a 2004 episode of CSI: Crime Scene Investigation and a 2007 episode of The Game.

In 2005, Haven was the executive producer of the documentary Trudell, which chronicles the life and work of Santee Sioux musician and activist John Trudell. Trudell was an official selection at the Sundance Film Festival and the Tribeca Festival; it won the Special Jury Prize for Best Documentary at the Seattle International Film Festival. In 2011, he served as executive producer for the short comedy film That's Our Mary, which follows two actresses awaiting the final casting decision for the role of the Virgin Mary at a faith-based film studio. Since 2006, Haven has been the executive board director of Artivist, a festival in Los Angeles that highlights films addressing human rights, animal rights and environmental issues.

Haven retired from acting in 2013. He directed his father and Anton Yelchin in the short film Court of Conscience (2015).

== Personal life ==
Like his sister, Haven was estranged from his father for a while. During that time, he legally dropped "Voight" as his surname. In the wake of his mother's death from ovarian cancer on January 27, 2007, he reconciled with his father after a six-year estrangement. Haven grew up Catholic and became a born-again Christian in 2009. In August 2024, Haven married reality television personality Romi Imbelli, who appeared on The Real L Word. They had been close friends for over 20 years. They applied for annulment two weeks later.

Haven came out as gay in 2026.

== Filmography ==
Title	Year	Role	Notes
Gia	1998	Young man on Sansom Street	TV film
Hell's Kitchen	1998	Boyle's bartender	
Scrapbook	1999	Jamie Park	
Original Sin	2001	Faust	
Monster's Ball	2001	Hospital guard	
Ocean Park	2002	Youngblood	
Hunting of Man	2003	Usher	
CSI: Crime Scene Investigation	2004	Lazarus Kane	TV series Episode: "Suckers" (4.13)
Rent-a-Person	2004	James Coleman	Short film
Breaking Dawn	2004	Don Wake	Film
Stay Alive	2006	Jonathan Malkus	
Validation	2007	Uniformed couple	Short film
The Game	2007	Director	TV series Episode: "The Ghost of Derwin Past" (2.10)
Deep in the Heart	2012	Gary	
Easy Silence	2013	Trent	Short film
