= Annie Lobert =

American former prostitute and Christian missionary

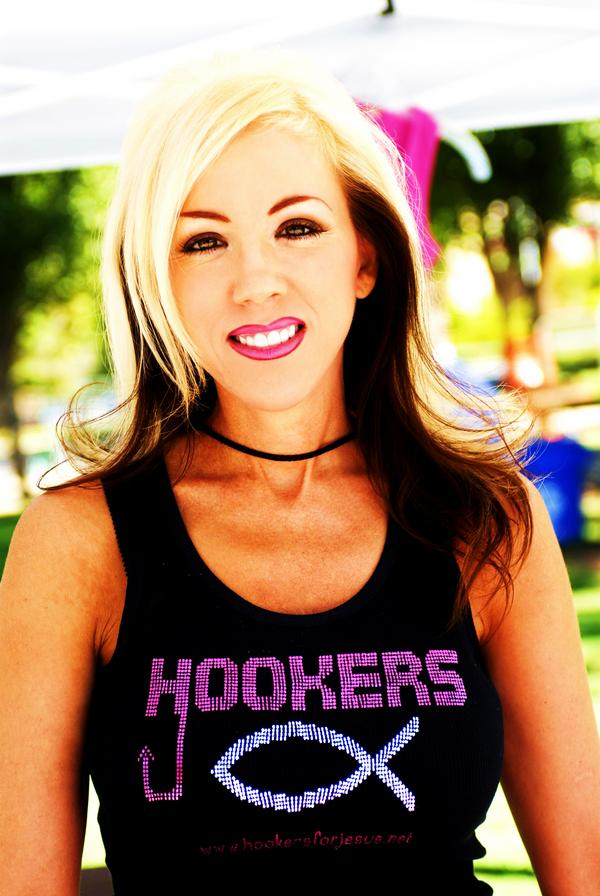
- Lobert, founder and president of Hookers for Jesus
- Born: September 26, 1967 (age 58); Minneapolis, Minnesota
- Other names: Fallen York
- Education: Frederic High School
- Occupations: Executive director, missionary, motivational speaker
- Years active: Established ministry in 2005
- Known for: Hookers for Jesus
- Spouse: Oz Fox (m. 2009)
- Website: www.hookersforjesus.net

Annie Lobert (born September 26, 1967) is an American former call girl and sex industry worker, who founded the international Christian ministry Hookers for Jesus. In 2010, she produced and starred in a three-part documentary on the organization, Hookers: Saved on the Strip, which was broadcast nationwide on cable television's Investigation Discovery.

== Early life ==
Annie Lobert was born on September 26, 1967, in Minneapolis, Minnesota. She is the daughter of Chet and Joanne (née Osgar) Lobert. She is the second youngest of four children. She has a sister, Diana, and two brothers, Chuck and Bill. Diana died from Marfan's syndrome in 1995. Lobert attended Amery High School in Amery, Wisconsin, and graduated from Frederic High School in Frederic, Wisconsin, in 1986.

Starting at the age of 18, she did prostitution in Minneapolis, Hawaii and Las Vegas, for 16 years. She left the sex industry with the support of Al Nakata, one of her regular customers, who had fallen in love with her. After leaving prostitution, Nakata trained her in estimates and service reviews in order to work with him in his Super GT Series auto body and design firm.

== Career ==
=== Hookers for Jesus ===
In 2005, she founded the organization Hookers for Jesus, an international, Christian faith-based nonprofit organization that addresses prostitution, sex trafficking, and sexual violence and exploitation linked to pornography and the sex industry.

In 2007, Hookers for Jesus established a safe house program in the Las Vegas area with one of The Church at South Las Vegas intern homes. The program, titled "Destiny House", is a safe haven for victims of sex trafficking and primarily serves prostitutes and local sex trade workers. Annie left CSLV (Church of South Las Vegas) and currently has a new Destiny House Estate. Annie now attends Valley Bible Fellowship of Las Vegas.

=== Media and public appearances ===
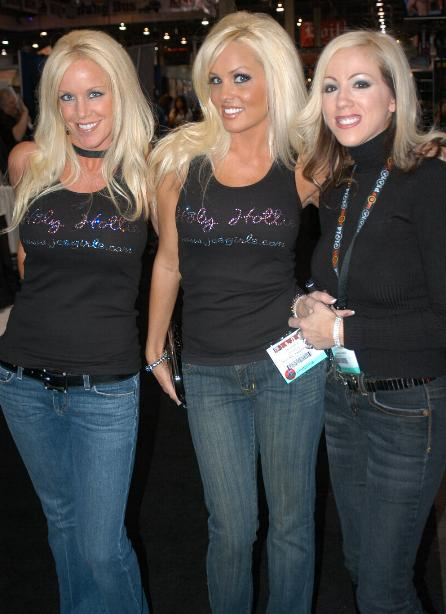
Lori Albee, Heather Veitch, and Annie Lobert at the Adult Entertainment Expo, 2007

In 2006, Lobert began working on a joint media project with Heather Veitch of JCs Girls, entitled "Saving Sex City". However, the project was short lived and as of November 2008, Lobert and Veitch were no longer producing episodes.

In March 2009, Lobert participated in a nationally televised informal debate presented by ABC News Nightline that posed the question, "Does Satan Exist?" Other participants in the debate included Carlton Pearson; Deepak Chopra; and Mark Driscoll, pastor of Mars Hill Church in Seattle, where the debate was held. The debate was the third installment of the "Face-Off" series presented by Nightline, following "Does God Exist?" and "America Addicted to Porn?".

Lobert has spoken in churches and regional conferences throughout the United States, as well as during news reports and national news magazine programs. Her topics generally include a presentation of her testimony and experiences as a victim of sex trafficking, while sharing an overview of the primary and secondary harmful effects of involvement in the sex industry.

As of 2010, Lobert has been involved with MTV EXIT Concerts and The Whosoevers, a rock band and national evangelistic speaking group. During these events, she speaks and shares the story of her life. Taking the name "The Whosoevers" (from John 3:16), the purpose of the group is to "impact those whose pain has previously driven them to addictive or self-destructive behaviors." Regular members and leaders of the group include Korn member, Brian "Head" Welch; Sonny Sandoval of P.O.D. and Lacey Sturm of Flyleaf.

In 2010, Lobert appeared on news programs and talk shows in support of an Investigation Discovery documentary show, Hookers: Saved on the Strip, including on NBC's Today Show with Meredith Vieira, and HLN's The Joy Behar Show.

Annie Lobert and her Destiny House program are depicted as themselves in the 2022 indie sex trafficking thriller Beyond the Neon. Although the movie itself is scripted, Lobert and the interviews with victims are authentic and documented footage of real survivors.

==== Television appearances ====
- The 700 Club on Christian Broadcasting Network
- ABC News Nightline: "The Nightline Face-Off: Does Satan Exist?"
- ABC News Nightline "Saving Sin City: Hookers for Jesus Target Unlikely Flock"
- Le Droit de Savoir with Charles Villeneuve
- Enjoying Everyday Life with Joyce Meyer
- HelpLine TV with Morris Cerullo
- Investigation Discovery Hookers: Saved on the Strip, three-part documentary, which debuted on December 8, 2010
- JCTV Christmas Special with Oz Fox (2008)
- The Jim Bakker Show with Mark Gungor
- The Joni Lamb Show
- Life Today with James and Betty Robison
- Praise the Lord with Paul Crouch Jr. on Trinity Broadcasting Network
- The Pussycat Preacher, documentary film by Bill Day featuring Heather Veitch
- The Tyra Banks Show

Radio appearances

Lobert has appeared on talk radio and interviewed in major news publications throughout the world, including Africa, Australia, France, Germany, Japan, Spain, the UK, and the United States.

== Author ==
Lobert's autobiography, Fallen, was released in February 2015 by Worthy Publishing.

== Personal life ==
On June 5, 2009, Lobert married Oz Fox, guitarist of the Christian band Stryper. The ceremony, which took place at The Church at South Las Vegas, was broadcast live on the Internet.
