= Heather Veitch =

American stripper turned Christian missionary

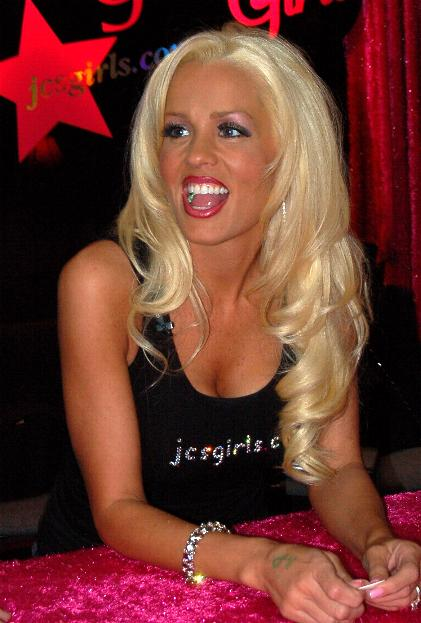
- Veitch at the 2006 Adult Entertainment Expo
- Born: 1973 or 1974 (age 51–52); United States
- Occupations: Christian minister, missionary

Heather Veitch (born March 7, 1974) is an American Christian missionary who worked previously as a stripper but now seeks to help women working in strip clubs leave the adult entertainment industry. She is the founder of the Christian ministry JC's Girls, based out of Las Vegas, Nevada.

Veitch is a frequent speaker, working with both secular and religious audiences throughout the United States. Her expertise and knowledge in reaching out to women working in strip clubs has been utilized throughout the world by organizations seeking to develop like-minded ministries.

== JC's Girls ==
JC's Girls is an international, faith-based organization that offers spiritual support to women working in the sex industry. Their primary focus includes visiting local strip clubs in order to extend an invitation to attend church. Their approach includes offering small gift packages along with ministry contact information. Additionally, the ministry participates in the annual AVN Adult Entertainment Expo held in Las Vegas. The organization has set up an exhibitor booth during the convention, presenting a message to entertainers and patrons with the message: "There is nothing you have ever done that God would not forgive you for!"

The organization has developed chapter ministries across the United States. These chapters include JCs Girls of San Diego; JCs Girls of Austin, Texas; JCs Girls of Las Vegas; and JCs Girls of Sioux Falls, South Dakota.

In 2007, Veitch began partnering with Annie Lobert of "Hookers for Jesus" on a joint media project entitled "Saving Sex City". However, the project was short lived and As of November 2008, Veitch and Lobert were no longer producing new episodes.

== Pussycat Preacher documentary ==
In 2007, Veitch's life and ministry were presented in a documentary. Directed by documentary filmmaker Bill Day, the film revealed the inside story of Veitch's life and her struggle to start a ministry for women in the sex industry. The film primarily focuses on Veitch, along with the team of Christian women who join her to become JC's Girls, and Pastor Matt Brown of Sandals Church in Riverside, California. The film highlights the pastor's efforts to support Veitch's endeavor, while facing opposition from his local congregation.

== Private life ==
Veitch was born in Los Angeles but grew up in Muscoy, San Bernardino County.
