= The Man Who Loved Women (1977 film) =

1977 film by François Truffaut

- Film poster
- Directed by: François Truffaut
- Written by: François Truffaut; Michel Fermaud; Suzanne Schiffman
- Produced by: Marcel Berbert
- Starring: Charles Denner; Brigitte Fossey; Nelly Borgeaud; Geneviève Fontanel; Leslie Caron
- Cinematography: Néstor Almendros
- Edited by: Martine Barraqué
- Music by: Maurice Jaubert
- Production company: Les Films du Carrosse
- Distributed by: Les Artistes Associés
- Release date: 27 April 1977
- Running time: 120 minutes
- Country: France
- Language: French
- Box office: $7.2 million

The Man Who Loved Women (French: L'Homme qui aimait les femmes) is a 1977 French comedy drama film directed by François Truffaut and starring Charles Denner, Brigitte Fossey, and Nelly Borgeaud. The film had a total of 955,262 admissions in France.

In 1983, Blake Edwards directed an American remake of the film, which starred Burt Reynolds as a sculptor and Julie Andrews as a psychiatrist.

== Plot ==
At a cemetery in Montpellier in December 1976, mourners gather for the funeral of Bertrand Morane. One of the attendants, Genevieve Bigey, stands apart from the others. She notices that everyone present is a woman.

Some time earlier, Bertrand, a man in early middle-age, works in a laboratory testing the aerodynamics of scale models of aircraft, but his real passion is pursuing women. He is often successful, though he has less luck with the woman from the service that calls to wake him up each morning. After spotting a pair of attractive legs, Bertrand goes to extraordinary lengths (which include faking a car accident) to find the woman to whom they belong, only to learn she was just visiting France and has already left the country by the time he tracks her down, though he does manage to sleep with Bernadette, an employee of the company from which the woman rented a car.

Bertrand becomes friendly with Hélène, who runs a lingerie shop and is close to his own age. After she confesses to only being attracted to younger men, Bertrand, sensing an imminent change in his lifestyle, decides to write his memoirs before he forgets the details of his many conquests. He writes of his first sexual experience, which was with a prostitute; his relationship with his mother, a beautiful, but cold, woman who largely ignored him and would leave him alone for days at a time to be with her lovers; and many of his other long- and short-term sexual relationships. An emotionally unstable woman named Delphine Grezel liked to make love in public, and her relationship with Bertrand only ended when she was imprisoned for shooting her husband. When Delphine is released, she visits Bertrand, and they have a threesome with Bernadette.

When Bertrand contracts gonorrhea, the doctor is impressed that he does not know who gave it to him, as he has had sex with six women in the previous twelve days. However, the typist who Bertrand is paying to make copies of his manuscript as he continues to write is embarrassed by the content, so she quits. Bertrand is disillusioned by this response and stops writing for a time, but he ultimately decides to continue. He takes a week off work to finish his book, which he sends to publishers.

The rejection letters begin to arrive, but one editor, Geneviève, likes Bertrand's manuscript and champions the work to her boss. He agrees to publish Bertrand's book without any changes, and, when Bertrand goes to Paris to meet with Geneviève, he runs into Véra, an old flame. Their breakup five years earlier caused Bertrand to require various pharmaceuticals and leave Paris, but he says he eventually pulled himself back together and does not think of her very often anymore. He denies Véra's request to have dinner and try to be friends.

Realizing that he wrote his book because of Véra, but neglected to even mention her in it, Bertrand calls Geneviève to say he has to rewrite the manuscript. She responds by telling him that it is common for writers to feel they have failed to write the book they had set out to write, but that she fought for the book he did write, and he should make his next project about Véra. Bertrand agrees to trust Geneviève, and the book is prepared for publication. Geneviève falls for Bertrand, and they have an affair.

During the Christmas season, Bertrand cannot get in touch with anyone in his little black book, so he goes out roaming the streets, and he is hit by a car while hurrying after two women. Severely injured, he is hospitalized and told not to move, but, noticing a nurse's attractive legs, he lunges at her, falls out of bed, and dies.

At Bertrand's funeral, Geneviève reflects that, of all of Bertrand's former lovers who have gathered, she is the only one who knows the full story of his life. She does not doubt that, in his own way, Bertrand loved each of them, and thinks he was seeking happiness in quantity, having not found it in any single person.

== Cast ==
- Charles Denner as Bertrand Morane
  - Michel Marti as young Bertrand
- Brigitte Fossey as Geneviève Bigey, an editor at Editions Betany
- Nelly Borgeaud as Delphine Grezel, one of Bertrand's lovers, who is married and emotionally unstable
- Geneviève Fontanel as Hélène, a lingerie saleswoman close to Bertrand's age
- Leslie Caron as Véra, one of Bertrand's former lovers, who he has not gotten over
- Nathalie Baye as Martine Desdoits, the woman whose car Bertrand says ran into his / the voice of "Aurore", the woman from the wake-up service (uncredited)
- Valérie Bonnier as Fabienne, one of Bertrand's former lovers, who he regrets making think he wanted a serious relationship
- Jean Dasté as Docteur Bicard, who diagnoses Bertrand with gonorrhea
- Sabine Glaser as Bernadette, the blonde employee at Midi Car
- Henri Agel as the older male editor at Editions Betany
- Nella Barbier as Liliane, the waitress who Bertrand gets a job as a telephone operator at the lab where he works
- Martine Chassaing as Denise, one of Bertrand's co-workers
- Monique Dury as Madame Duteil, the typist
- Roger Leenhardt as Mr. Betany, the publisher
- Christian Lentretien as the police inspector who tells Bertrand that Delphine is out of prison
- Rico Lopez as the customer in the restaurant who harasses Liliane
- Marie-Jeanne Montfajon as Christine Morane, Bertrand's mother
- Anna Perrier as Uta, the babysitter
- Roselyne Puyo as Nicole, the usherette, who is deaf
- Henry-Jean Servat as the younger male editor at Editions Betany
- Frédérique Jamet as Juliette, the crying girl on the stairs

François Truffaut has a brief, wordless cameo in the film as a man the hearse drives past during the opening title sequence.

== Production ==
Truffaut used his free time during the filming of Close Encounters of the Third Kind to write the script of The Man Who Loved Women.

Filming took place in Montpellier.

== Reception ==
The film was entered into the 27th Berlin International Film Festival. In the United States, it was nominated for Best Foreign Language Film by the National Board of Review.

At the time of the film's release, Vincent Canby of The New York Times described it as a "supremely humane, sophisticated comedy that is as much fun to watch for the variations Mr. Truffaut works on classic man-woman routines as for the routines themselves", and observed that "I suppose there's always been a little of the late Ernst Lubitsch in all Truffaut comedies, [...] but there is more than I've ever seen before in The Man Who Loved Women." Canby also said that "Denner is very, very funny as Bertrand, a fellow who has the same single-minded purpose as the rat exterminator he played in Such a Gorgeous Kid Like Me, as well as the delicacy of touch of Antoine Doinel on his best behavior", and called the scene featuring Leslie Caron the film's "most marvelous, most surprising", as it is "so remarkably well played and written that an entire love affair, from the beginning to the middle and the end, is movingly evoked through what is really just exposition."

In French Films 1945-1993, Melissa E. Biggs described the film as "extraordinary" and "made at just the right moment in time, when sexual obsession could still be ironic and celebrated and not held up to scorn by political correctness and feminist righteousness". More negatively, Ronald Bergan and Robyn Karney wrote in the Bloomsbury Foreign Film Guide that "the film obstinately refuses to cast light on its characters, making it no more than a superficial and sporadically entertaining exercise", and Geoff Andrew described the film in the Time Out Film Guide as "Charmless", saying it "irritates by its over-wrought sense of literary-style paradox, by its insistence on eccentricity as its source of humour".

On review aggregator website Rotten Tomatoes, the film holds an approval rating of 82% based on 11 reviews, with an average rating of 7.6/10.
