= Michael Grecco =

American photographer, director, and author (born 1958)

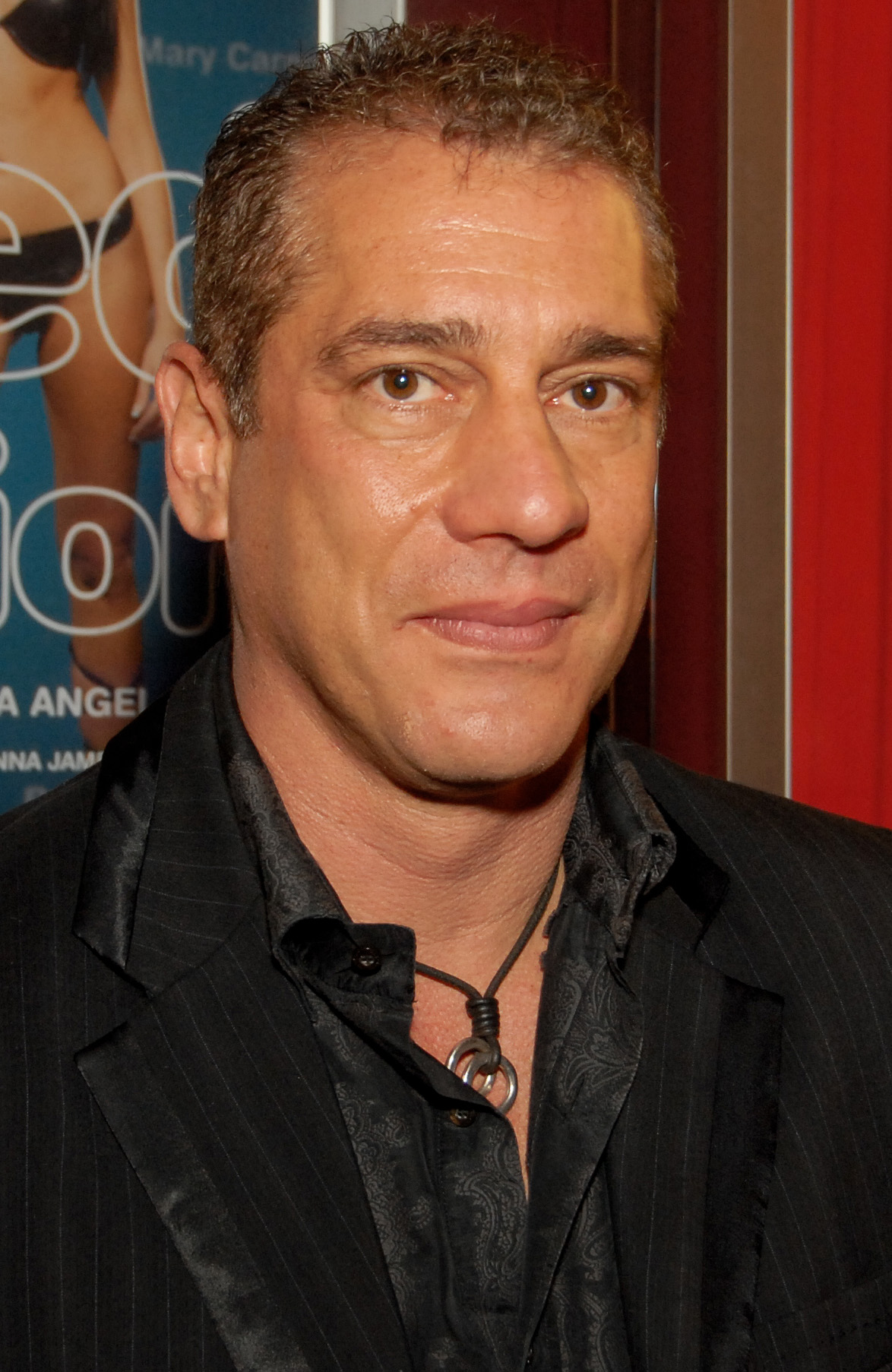
- Michael Grecco in 2009
- Born: May 20, 1958 (age 68); United States
- Education: Boston University
- Known for: Photography
- Website: grecco.com

Michael Grecco (born May 20, 1958) is an American photographer, film director and author.

== Early life and education ==
Grecco was born in the Bronx and grew up near New York City. He received his first camera (a Mamiya/Sekor 35mm single-lens reflex) when he was 12. He attended Boston University, where he studied filmmaking and photojournalism as an undergraduate at BU's School of Communications. During his time at Boston University he also studied with photography historian and photographer Carl Chiarenza.

== Career ==
While in college, Grecco began working as a freelance photographer for the Associated Press and then later became a staff photographer at Boston Herald. He also shot the burgeoning new music scene for Boston Rock Magazine and the Boston radio station WBCN, documenting Boston's "pivotal role in launching the punk rock explosion" of the 1970s. During the same time period, he began his career as a magazine photographer working for the Picture Group Agency based in Providence Rhode Island. His early work appeared in magazines including Time, Newsweek, Esquire, Vanity Fair, and Rolling Stone.

Grecco moved to Los Angeles in the late 1980s. As a contributor to People, his coverage of events such as the Golden Globes, the Emmy Awards and the Academy Awards led to his career as a celebrity portrait photographer. In 1993 he was asked to photograph a special edition of Businessweek called the "Entrepreneurs That Matter", traveling the world photographing the most important entrepreneurs of the day. That lead to being asked by Fox Broadcasting to shoot a new show, The X-Files, where he helped define the look of the show by "cross processing" color negative film in color slide chemistry and using special camera filters. In 2015 he created the first Cinemagraph to ever be used as a broadcast television spot for Pizza Hut, during the Turner Broadcasting show, Billy on the Street.

His subjects have included Martin Scorsese, Robert Duvall, Johnny Cash, Will Ferrell, Kanye West, Mel Brooks, Ben Stiller, Penélope Cruz, Jet Li, Bill Murray, Joaquin Phoenix and Gwen Stefani. He has shot covers for Time, Wired, Entertainment Weekly, ESPN, and People, among other publications.

Grecco's first two books were on lighting techniques in photographic portraiture. In 2007, he released Naked Ambition: An R Rated Look at an X Rated Industry, a collection of photographs on the American porn industry and its stars taken at the AVN Awards and Convention in Las Vegas. He also directed a documentary of the same name that premiered in April 2009. In 2020, a collection of Grecco's photos, Punk, Post Punk, New Wave: Onstage, Backstage, In Your Face, 1978-1991, was published by Abrams Books. A "photographic document of a critical pocket of the American punk scene in all its brash and seedy glory," the photos from the book were first exhibited at Photo London in 2021. In early 2022, a touring exhibit of the photos, Days of Punk, premiered at La Termica Museum in Malaga, Spain. Days of Punk was subsequently exhibited in England and at the Southeast Museum of Photography.

== Awards and recognition ==
In 1995 Photo District News named Grecco in their “Lighting Master” series. Grecco has received 5 Awards of Excellence from Communication Arts Magazine and in June 2001 was named a Hasselblad Master. He also received several awards in the 2011 Prix de la Photographie Paris competition including ones for his portraits of Steve Martin and Martin Scorsese and in 2012 was one of the eight recipients of the Professional Photographer Leadership Award from the United Nations International Photographic Council. As a staff photographer for the Boston Herald, he won several Boston Press Photographers awards.

== Copyright troll ==
Grecco has been accused of being a copyright troll. Between 2002 and 2025, Grecco has filed 220 copyright lawsuits against individuals, small blogs, and media giants. In 2019, Fox Corporation learned that Grecco was threatening copyright infringement suits against individuals for their use of publicity photos shot by Grecco for Fox shows and sent him a cease and desist letter in response. Grecco settled with Fox, "agree[ing] and acknowledg[ing] that the scope of Grecco’s license to Fox in the remaining Gallery photographs is limited to the Permitted non-exclusive uses, which, for the avoidance of all doubt, permits all advertising and publicity uses, including but not limited to retrospective advertising and publicity uses and archival advertising and publicity uses.”

While Grecco has threatened to seek statutory damages of $150,000 per violation, and offered settlements in the tens of thousands of dollars, Grecco has been awarded damages of less than $1000 when forced to trial.

== Bibliography ==
- The Art of Portrait Photography, Creative Lighting Techniques and Strategies, 126 pages. Amherst Media (2000). ISBN 0936262850
- Lighting and the Dramatic Portrait, the Art of Celebrity and Editorial Photography, 192 pages. Amphoto (2006). ISBN 0817442278
- Naked Ambition: An R Rated Look at an X Rated Industry, 224 pages. Rock Out Books (2007). ISBN 0979331404
- Punk, Post Punk, New Wave: Onstage, Backstage, In Your Face, 1978–1991, 240 pages, Abrams Books (2020), ISBN 1419748548

== Personal life ==
Grecco is based in Los Angeles. He has three children. He and his wife, Elizabeth Waterman, a photographer and the CEO of Black + Gold, a marketing agency, were married in 2018.
