= AVN Adult Entertainment Expo =

Trade fair in Nevada, United States

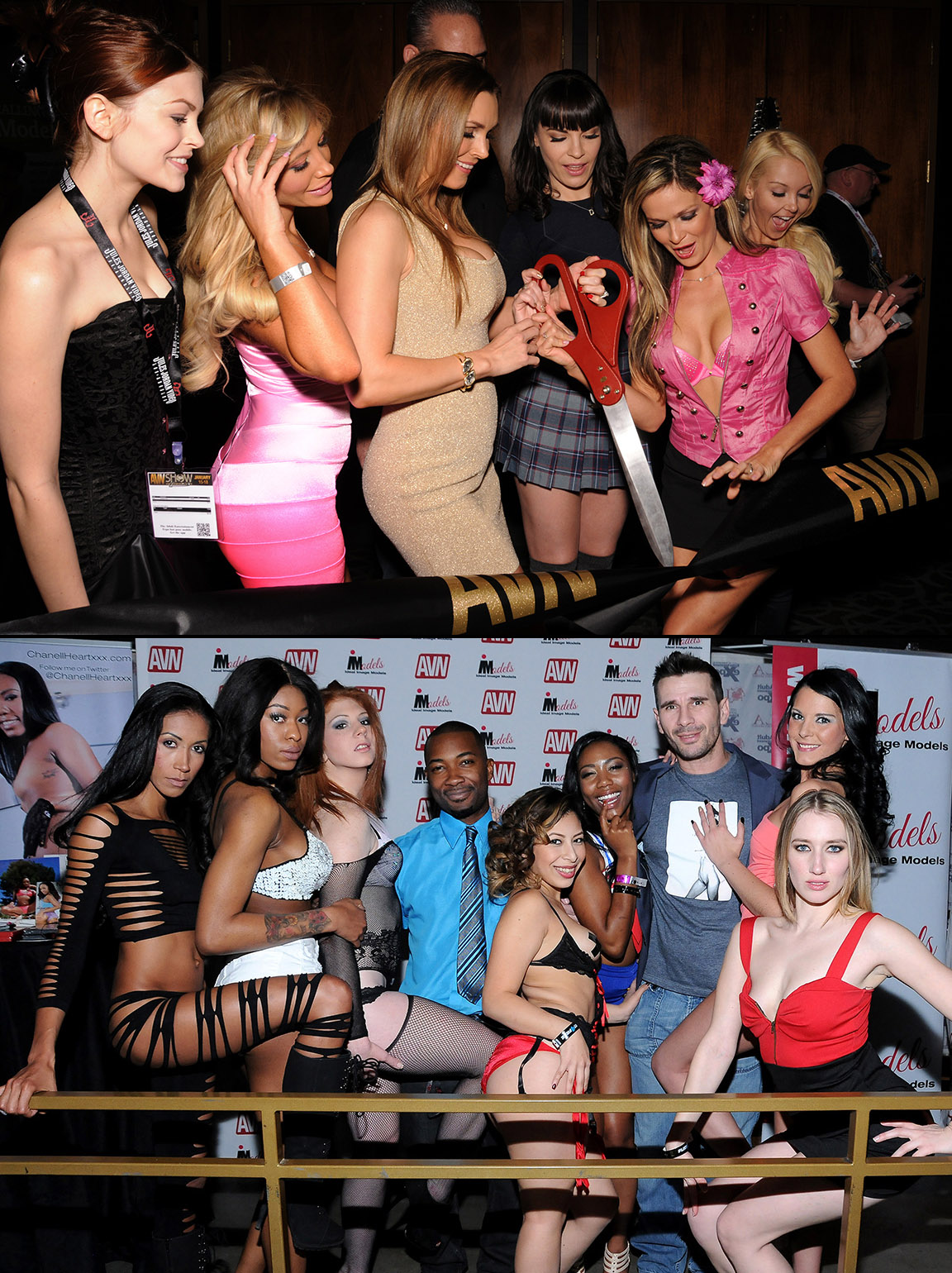
- Top: AVN Expo 2014 Ribbon Cutting. Bottom: Models on the Show Floor 2015 at the Hard Rock Hotel, Las Vegas
- Status: Active
- Genre: Adult entertainment, erotica, pornography
- Venue: Virgin Hotels Las Vegas
- Locations: Las Vegas, Nevada, U.S.
- Country: United States
- Organizer: AVN (magazine)
- Website: adultentertainmentexpo.com

The AVN Adult Entertainment Expo (AEE) is an adult entertainment convention and trade show held each January in Las Vegas, Nevada, and is sponsored by AVN magazine. AEE is the largest pornography industry trade show in the United States. The 2007 AVN Expo had over 30,000 attendees, which included 355 exhibiting companies.

== Description ==
The AEE is a four-day show, held each January in Las Vegas, Nevada, which mixes industry-only events with open hours for fans seeking autographs, photo opportunities, and memorabilia. The AVN Awards are presented on the show's closing night.

== History ==
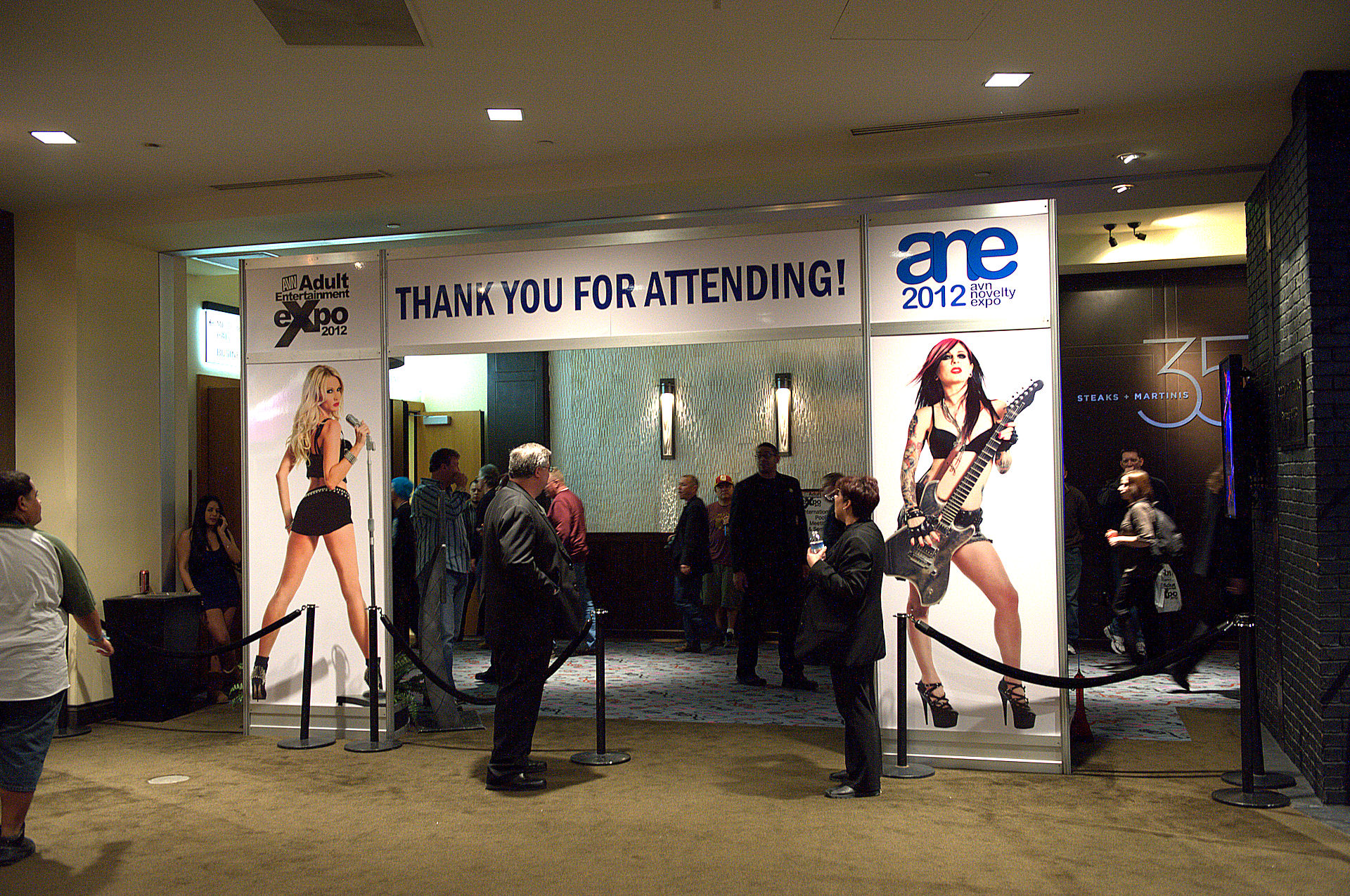
29th AVN Awards at AEE 2012 Expo

Until 2012, the AEE was usually held at the Sands Expo and Convention Center concurrently with the Consumer Electronics Show (CES). In 2012, the AEE was held at the Las Vegas Hard Rock Hotel and Casino on January 18–21, one week after the 2012 CES to help exhibitors minimize travel expenses and maximize networking opportunities.

In 2013, the 15th annual AEE was again held at the Hard Rock Hotel and Casino in Las Vegas, and the 2014 AEE was held January 15–18 at the Hard Rock Hotel and Casino in Las Vegas, as was the 2015 AEE.

== Coverage ==
The 1998 AEE and associated 15th AVN Awards are the subject of David Foster Wallace's article "Neither Adult nor Entertainment", published in Premiere, and later reprinted and extended as "Big Red Son", the first essay of his collection Consider the Lobster. The 2003 AEE was filmed as part of the production of the 2004 film The Girl Next Door.

== See also ==
- AVN Awards
- GayVN Awards
