= Live (Zebra album) =

Live album by Zebra
- Released: 1990
- Recorded: 1989
- Genres: Hard rock, heavy metal
- Length: 74:09
- Label: Atlantic
- Producer: Randy Jackson

Zebra chronology
3.V (1986)	Live (1990)	The King Biscuit Flower Hour (1999)

Professional ratings
Review scores
Source	Rating
Allmusic	3/5 stars

Live is the first live album by American hard rock band Zebra, released in 1990. The recordings are taken from two shows they performed at Sundance in Bayshore on Long Island on November 25 and 26, 1989. It features six songs from their debut album, two songs from No Tellin' Lies, three from 3.V, and a single Led Zeppelin cover (a practice they are well known for), in addition to two new tracks ("She's Waiting for You" and "The Last Time") that were played live during this period, but did not receive the studio treatment for 36 years until the release of their fifth studio album V.

== Track listing ==
All songs written by Randy Jackson, except where indicated.

1. "As I Said Before"† - 3:32 (Original version found on Zebra)
2. "She's Waiting For You" - 4:25 (Unreleased track)
3. "Last Time" - 4:59 (Unreleased track)
4. "Wait Until The Summer's Gone" - 3:42 (Original version found on No Tellin' Lies)
5. "One More Chance" - 3:38 (Original version found on Zebra)
6. "Take Your Fingers From My Hair" - 8:25 (Original version found on Zebra)
7. "Bears" - 4:40 (Original version found on No Tellin' Lies)
8. "Better Not Call" - 5:33 (Original version found on 3.V)
9. "The La La Song" - 10:19 (Original version found on Zebra)
10. "Time" - 2:23 (Original version found on 3.V)
11. "Who's Behind The Door?" - 6:16 (Original version found on Zebra)
12. "He's Making You The Fool"†† - 3:52 (Original version found on 3.V)
13. "Tell Me What You Want" - 4:22 (Original version found on Zebra)
14. "The Ocean" (John Bonham, John Paul Jones, Jimmy Page and Robert Plant) - 5:00 (Led Zeppelin cover)

†Title listed as "Said Before" on CD.

††Title listed as "Making You The Fool" on CD.

== Personnel ==
- Randy Jackson - guitar, lead vocals
- Felix Hanemann - bass, backing vocals, keyboards
- Guy Gelso - drums, backing vocals, percussion
