= King Biscuit Flower Hour (Zebra album) =

Live album by Zebra
- Released: June 22, 1999
- Recorded: November 13, 1984 and January 26, 1985
- Genres: Rock, progressive rock
- Length: 63:42
- Label: King Biscuit Entertainment

Zebra chronology
Live (1990)	King Biscuit Flower Hour (1999)	Zebra IV (2003)

Professional ratings
Review scores
Source	Rating
Allmusic	3/5 stars

King Biscuit Flower Hour is a live album recorded live in 1984 by Zebra, released in 1999. The tracks are mainly from Zebra and No Tellin' Lies. Some are played in an extended fashion, but most are just like the album. As a souvenir for the fans, an interview recorded on January 26, 1985 was added to the album.

== Track listing ==
1. "Who's Behind The Door?" - 7:55
2. "The La La Song" - 9:10
3. "Bears" - 4:46
4. "Tell Me What You Want" - 4:08
5. "I Don't Care" - 3:21
6. "I Don't Like It" - 4:09
7. "As I Said Before" - 3:05
8. "Slow Down" (Larry Willams) - 3:50
9. "Interview '85" - 20:18

=== Personnel ===
- Randy Jackson - guitar and vocals
- Felix Hanemann - keyboards and bass guitar
- Guy Gelso - drums
