= Zebra IV =

Studio album by Zebra
- Released: July 8, 2003
- Genres: Hard rock, heavy metal
- Length: 52:20
- Label: Mayhem

Zebra chronology
King Biscuit Flower Hour (1999)	Zebra IV (2003)	V (2026)

Zebra IV is the fourth studio album by American hard rock trio Zebra. It was released on 8 July 2003, 20 years after their 1983 debut album, and 17 years after their last studio effort, 3.V from 1986. Although Zebra had continued to be active in the years following its release, this was the band's last studio album for 23 years until the release of their fifth studio album V.

== Track listing ==
No.	Title	Writer(s)	Length
1.	"Arabian Nights"	Mark Hitt, Randy Jackson	5:19
2.	"Light of My Love"	Jackson	3:50
3.	"Who Am I"	Jackson	3:57
4.	"Angels Calling"	Jackson	4:46
5.	"K.K. Is Hiding"	Jackson	4:54
6.	"Free"	Guy Gelso, Felix Hanemann, Jackson	3:11
7.	"So I Dance"	Jackson	4:30
8.	"Waiting to Die"	Jackson	7:51
9.	"A World That Is Learning"	Jackson	4:03
10.	"My Life Has Changed"	Jackson	4:49
11.	"Why"	Jackson	5:10

== Personnel ==
=== Band members ===
- Randy Jackson – guitar, lead vocals, keyboards
- Felix Hanemann – bass, backing vocals, keyboards
- Guy Gelso – drums, backing vocals, percussion

=== Additional musicians ===
- Chillie Willie – Saxophone

=== Production ===
- Randy Jackson – Producer, Engineer
- Joel Singer – Technical adviser
- Mark Hitt – Composer
- Wendy Baner – Graphic design
- Charles Demar – Artwork, Design
- Robert Geiger – Photography
