= Love on the Line (EP) =

EP by Whitecross
- Released: January 15, 1988
- Genre: Christian Metal
- Label: Star Song

Whitecross chronology
Whitecross (1987)	Love on the Line (EP) (1988)	Hammer & Nail (1988)

Professional ratings
Review scores
Source	Rating
CCM Magazine	(not rated)

Love on the Line: The 6.98 EP was a $6.98 EP recording from the Christian metal band Whitecross. It was never released on CD; it was only released on cassette tape & 12" vinyl record formats. Tracks 3 and 4 are taken from the Whitecross debut album, while track 1 would later appear on the remake of their debut album Nineteen Eighty Seven. Track 1 can also be found on a few compilations which are available on CD (Testify & Heavy Righteous Metal compilations). Track 2 is available on CD as a bonus track on the Japanese version of In the Kingdom. The B-side repeats the four songs from the A-side.

CCM magazine stated that the lyrics showed that the band had an "evident evangelistic zeal."

== Track listing ==
No.	Title	Length
1.	"Love on the Line"	6:02
2.	"I Believe"	3:59
3.	"No Way I'm Goin' Down"	4:11
4.	"Enough Is Enough"	4:01

== Personnel ==
- Scott Wenzel – Vocals
- Rex Carroll – Guitars
- Mark Hedl – Drums
- Jon Sproule – bass
- Rex Carroll – producer (new songs)
- Gavin Morkel – executive producer
