= Hammer & Nail =

Studio album by Whitecross
- Released: May 23, 1988
- Genre: Christian metal
- Label: Pure Metal
- Producer: Joey Powers, Rex Carroll, Gavin Morkel

Whitecross chronology
Love on the Line (EP) (1988)	Hammer & Nail (1988)	Triumphant Return (1989)

Professional ratings
Review scores
Source	Rating
CCM Magazine	(no rating)
Kerrang!	4/5 stars

Hammer & Nail is the second album by Christian metal band Whitecross, released on May 23, 1988. It reached No. 15 on Billboard's Top Contemporary Christian Albums chart. A review in CCM magazine stated that the album "wages war against mediocrity" so often found in Christian metal.

== Track listing ==
No.	Title	Length
1.	"Living on the Edge"	5:13
2.	"When the Walls Tumble Down"	3:33
3.	"The Hammer and the Nail"	1:35
4.	"Take It to the Limit"	4:09
5.	"Walk with Me"	4:45
6.	"Because of Jesus"	3:41
7.	"When the Clock Strikes"	4:34
8.	"Resist Him"	4:22
9.	"Living in a Lost World"	3:52
10.	"Top of the World"	3:43

== Personnel ==
- Scott Wenzel – vocals
- Rex Carroll – guitars
- Mark Hedl – drums
- Jon Sproule – bass
