= Tracy Ferrie =

American musician

- Origin: Elkhart, Indiana, U.S.
- Genres: Rock, hard rock, Christian rock
- Occupations: Bass guitarist, singer
- Instruments: Bass guitar, vocals
- Years active: 1996–present

Tracy Ferrie is an American musician, who is the current bass player for the classic rock band Boston and is the former bass player of Christian metal band Stryper.

== Biography ==
Ferrie grew up in Northern Indiana where he was encouraged by his high school band director to pursue music, leading him to study at Berklee College of Music in the Music Production and Engineering departments. During his grade school days, Ferrie learned to play various instruments including tuba, guitar, upright bass, and percussion, but was requested to play electric bass by his band director. Bass quickly became Ferrie's main instrument and gained him many session gigs, live and in the studio.

After two and a half years of studying at Berklee, Ferrie was attacked and mugged outside of Boston. After hospitalization and multiple surgeries, Ferrie moved back home to Indiana recover. He eventually moved to Hollywood and enrolled at Musicians Institute. While in Los Angeles he began taking jobs for recording sessions and performing live with bands and in videos, some of which were featured on MTV. Ferrie's first touring act across the south western United States was with the band Electrik.

Ferrie's big break came from Dez Dickerson, who played guitar for Prince's band The Revolution. Dickerson was able to get Ferrie an audition for the Christian metal band Whitecross, with whom he recorded two full albums and completed two world tours with. He also played and wrote for Whitecross's labelmate, Seraiah.

Since 1996, Tracy played bass for Michael Sweet's solo band, Sally Steele, Guardian, Rebecca St. James, Plumb, Sonicflood, Greg Long and Strange Celebrity before joining Stryper in 2004. He participated on stage in the Boston Strong Benefit along with Aerosmith, J. Geils, Jimmy Buffett, Carole King and James Taylor. As a member of Stryper, Tracy was joined By Tom Scholz and Gary Pihl to play "Peace of Mind" for the Station nightclub fire benefit for the families and victims of the tragic fire in Rhode Island.

Some of his recording credits are with Stryper, Plumb, April McLean, Strange Celebrity, Whitecross, Jeff Deyo, Boe Braswell, Kristy Starling, Danielle Bollinger, Paul Alan, and Kimberley Locke. Tracy is the Assistant Minister at Grace Church of East Dennis on Cape Cod.

Ferrie has since left Stryper to join Boston, replacing Kimberley Dahme in mid-2012.

Ferrie is also a national roller skating champion.

== Discography ==
- 1992: Seraiah, Seraiah (bass and backing vocals)
- 1994: Unveiled, Whitecross (bass and backing vocals)
- 1995: Equilibrium, Whitecross (bass and backing vocals)
- 2001: Becoming, April McLean (bass)
- 2003: Remedy, Strange Celebrity
- 2005: Reborn, Stryper (bass)
- 2006: Him, Michael Sweet (bass)
- 2009: Murder by Pride, Stryper (bass)
- 2013: My Independence, Erika Van Pelt (bass on "Walk Through The Storm")
