= Unveiled =

Unveiled may refer to:

- Fremde Haut, a German film released in 2005 and distributed in the U.S. under the title Unveiled
- "Unveiled", an episode of the television series Alias
- Unveiled (Whitecross album)
- Unveiled (Cage album)
- Unveiled, a 1994 film starring Lisa Zane
- Unveiled, 2019 book by Yasmine Mohammed
