= Lovewar =

American band

- Origin: IN, U.S.
- Genre: Hard rock
- Years active: 1993
- Label: Pakaderm Records
- Members: Disbanded

Lovewar was an American technical hard rock band. They released just one album titled Soak Your Brain, which was published in 1993 before disbanding a few years later. It was produced by the siblings John Elefante and Dino Elefante. In 2019, they released a self-titled album featuring all 3 members.

Soak Your Brain ranked 47/100 in the Heaven's Metal Top 100 Christian Rock Albums of All Time. Bassist Rick Armstrong used to play for the Christian metal band Whitecross. He played bass on their 1993 output Triumphant Return.

Guitarist Tim Bushong went on to form "The Channelsurfers" in 1997, and released 2 albums, touring until the band's final gig in October 1999. He founded his own recording studio, TBush Recording, in Feb. of 2000 and produced many hard rock/metal bands, in addition providing instrumentation for singer/songwriters. He also produced "Tsar Bomba" for Christian hardrockers Bride several years later. He also acted as engineer and recordist for many other Christian and secular albums. He currently pastors Syracuse (IN) Baptist Church.

Drummer Greg Purlee now plays in the Christian country quartet, Simon Peter Band.

== Members ==
- Tim Bushong (lead vocals, guitar)
- Greg Purlee (drums, backing vocals)
- Rick Armstrong (bass, backing vocals)

== Discography ==
- Demo (1990)
- Soak Your Brain (1993) Pakaderm Records, Word Records
- Lovewar (2019) Roxx Records
