= Rachel Barton Pine =

American violinist (born 1974)

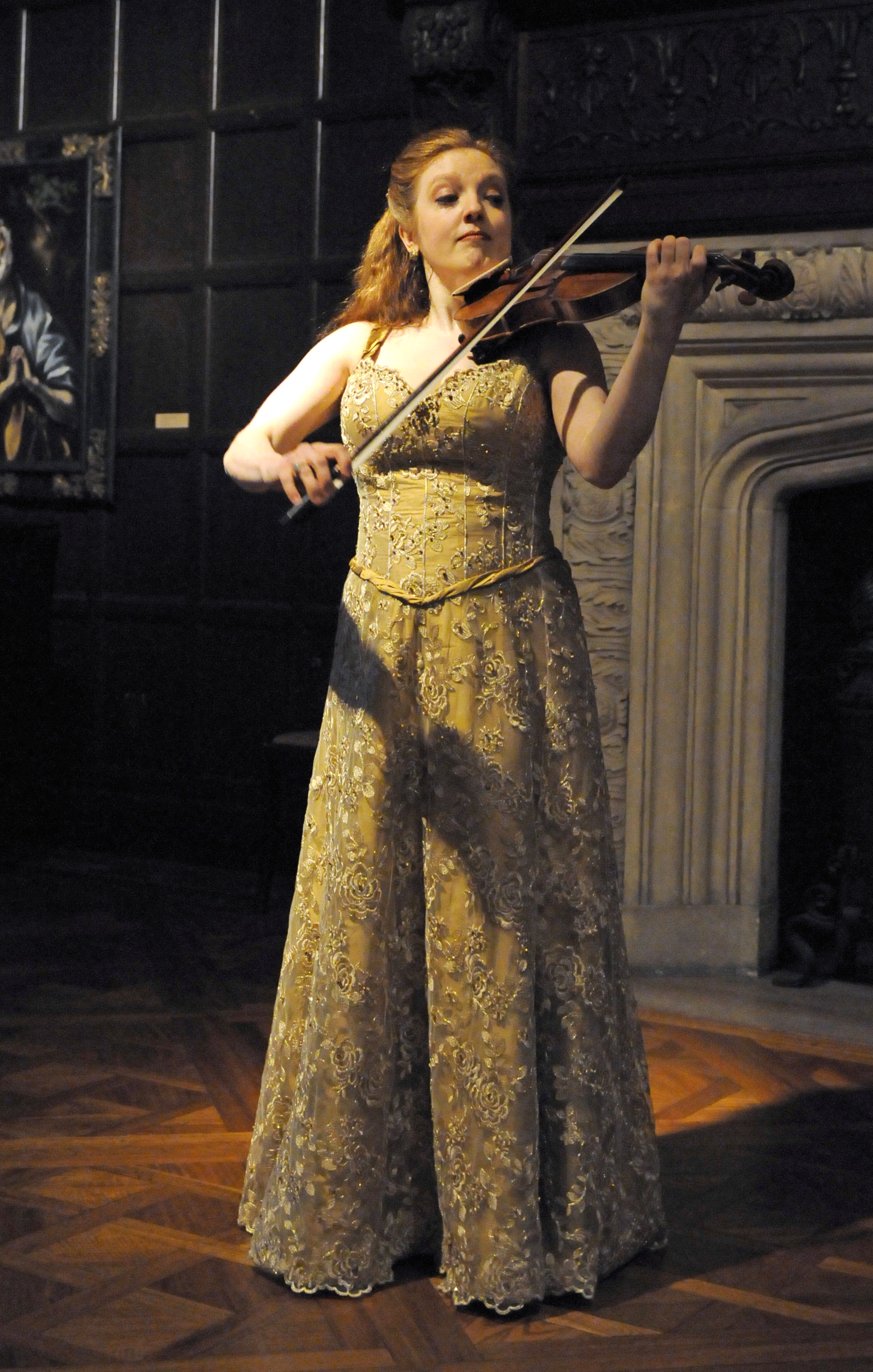
- Pine performing at the Phillips Collection in Washington D.C. in 2011

Background information
- Born: Rachel Elizabeth Barton; October 11, 1974 (age 52); Chicago, Illinois, U.S.
- Genres: Classical metal; baroque rock; heavy metal
- Occupation: Violinist
- Years active: 1981–present
- Website: rachelbartonpine.com

Rachel Barton Pine (born Rachel Elizabeth Barton, October 11, 1974) is an American violinist. She debuted with the Chicago Symphony at age 10, and was the first American and youngest ever gold medal winner of the International Johann Sebastian Bach Competition. The Washington Post wrote that she "displays a power and confidence that puts her in the top echelon."

Pine tours worldwide as a soloist with prestigious orchestras, has an active recording career, and has run the Rachel Barton Pine Foundation since 2001, which provides services and funding to promote classical music education and performances.

== Early life ==
Pine was born in Chicago, and began playing the violin at age 3 after being inspired by the example of older girls playing at her church. She debuted with the Chicago String Ensemble at age 7, and with the Chicago Symphony under the baton of Erich Leinsdorf at age 10. Her passion for violin compelled her to practice 4 or 5 hours a day as a second grader, prompting her elementary school principal to encourage her parents to begin home schooling, which allowed her to focus on her music, practicing 8 hours a day. Her principal teachers were Roland and Almita Vamos of the Music Institute of Chicago. At age 14, she began taking paid gigs playing at weddings and in orchestras, which allowed her to contribute significantly to her family's income as they experienced financial difficulties. Explaining how she managed, she says, "I put on a lot of makeup and pretended I was older than I was."

She attained notable success in a number of violin competitions, including winning the 1992 Johann Sebastian Bach International Competition in Leipzig, Germany. She also earned 2nd prizes in the József Szigeti Violin Competition (1992) and the International Fritz Kreisler Competition (1992), as well as awards from the Montreal International Musical Competition (1991), the Paganini Competition (1993), and the Queen Elisabeth Music Competition (1993).

== Career ==
Pine has appeared as a soloist with orchestras around the world including the Chicago, Montreal, Atlanta, Budapest, San Diego, Baltimore, St. Louis, Vienna, New Zealand, Iceland and Dallas symphonies; the Buffalo, Rochester, Royal, Calgary, Russian and New Mexico philharmonics, the Philadelphia, Louisville, Royal Scottish and Belgian National orchestras; the Mozarteum, Scottish and Israel chamber orchestras, and the Netherlands Radio Chamber Philharmonic. She has performed under conductors such as Charles Dutoit, John Nelson, Zubin Mehta, Erich Leinsdorf, Neeme Järvi, Marin Alsop, Semyon Bychkov, Plácido Domingo, and José Serebrier, and with artists including Daniel Barenboim, Christoph Eschenbach, Christopher O'Reilly, Mark O'Connor, and William Warfield.

Her festival appearances include Marlboro, Ravinia, Montreal, Wolf Trap, Vail, Davos, and Salzburg's Mozartwoche at the invitation of Franz Welser-Möst.

Her premieres of pieces by living composers include "Rush" for solo violin by Augusta Read Thomas, Mohammed Fairouz's "Native Informant" Sonata for Solo Violin and "Al-Andalus" Violin Concerto, and the Panamanian premiere of Panamanian composer Roque Cordero's 1962 Violin Concerto. In April 2017, Pine performed solo violin with the Phoenix Symphony under the baton of Tito Munoz debuting the Violin Concerto, "Dependent Arising" by Earl Maneein (b. 1976). Her "American Partitas" is a recital program of suites of dance movements composed for Pine by Bruce Molsky, Darol Anger, Billy Childs, and Daniel Bernard Roumain written in response to the Bach Partitas for solo violin paired with their Bach counterparts.

In addition to her mixed recital programs, Pine has regularly given single evening performances of the six Bach Sonatas and Partitas, the 24 Paganini Caprices, and the complete Brahms Sonatas.

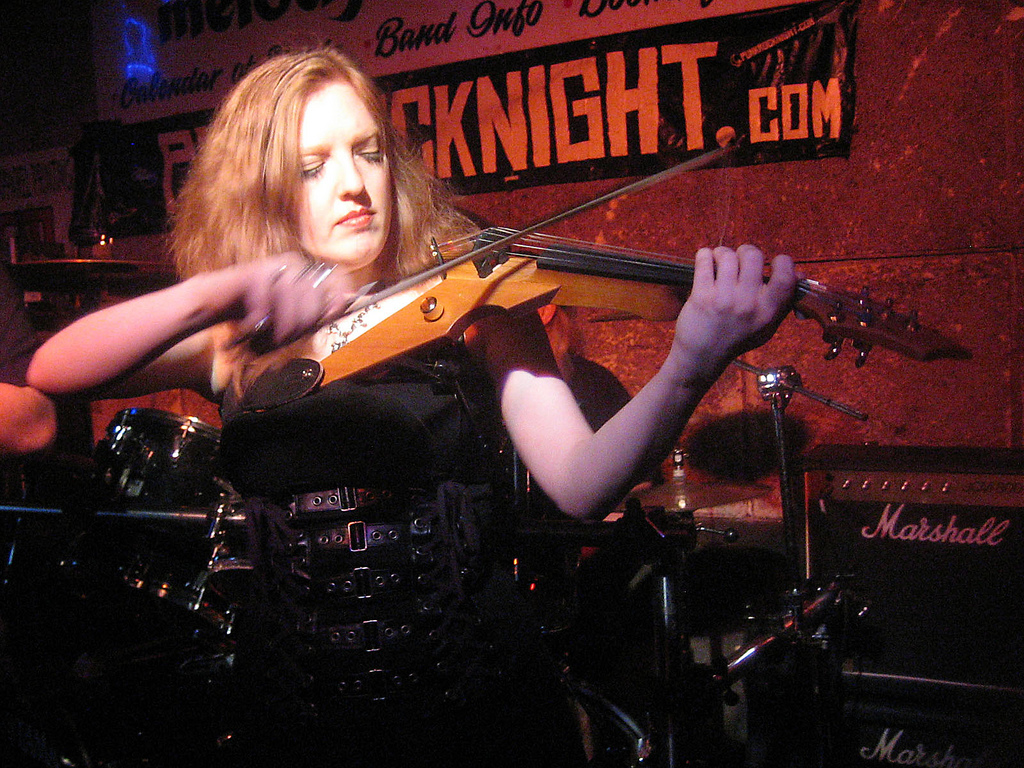
Pine performing in 2008

In 2015, Pine released her debut Avie Records recording Mozart: Complete Violin Concertos with one of her "musical heroes" conductor Sir Neville Marriner and The Academy of St Martin in the Fields. Pine grew up listening to Sir Neville and The Academy of St Martin in the Fields' recordings and their performance on the Amadeus movie soundtrack. Studying Mozart's operas she gained an appreciation for the drama, playfulness and flirtation of his violin concertos featured on the new album. The recording also contains Mozart's Sinfonia Concertante, recorded with violist Matthew Lipman, a 2015 Avery Fisher Career Grant recipient.

Pine started exploring esteemed violin concertos and the concertos that inspired them with Brahms and Joachim Violin Concertos, recorded with the Chicago Symphony Orchestra and conductor Carlos Kalmar in 2002. Her 2008 Beethoven & Clement Violin Concertos, recorded with The Royal Philharmonic and conducted by Serebrier, offered the world premiere recording of Clement's D major Violin Concerto.

Her 2013 recording with pianist Matthew Hagle, Violin Lullabies, debuted at number one on the Billboard classical chart. Pine's recording of Violin Concertos by Black Composers of the 18th and 19th Centuries was nominated for a National Public Radio Heritage Award.

Carl Fischer Music published a sheet music book in 2009 of cadenzas and virtuosic encore pieces composed by Pine, as well as her arrangements of other works for violin and piano, as part of its Masters Collection. Pine became the first living composer and first woman to be so honored. Pine has also edited a 4-volume collection of compositions associated with America's pioneering female solo violinist Maud Powell, many of which she has also recorded. In 2014. Pine helped to accept a posthumous Lifetime Achievement Grammy Award on behalf of Maud Powell, after successfully campaigning the Recording Academy for the honor.

Her musical interests extend well beyond classical to baroque, folk, Celtic, rock, and jazz. She regularly instructs at Mark O'Connor's annual summer fiddle camp, and in 2004 she released a CD in collaboration with Scottish fiddler Alasdair Fraser. She has also served as faculty at the Mark Wood Rock Orchestra Camp.

Pine performs chamber music as part of Trio Settecento with David Schrader and John Mark Rozendaal, and with the Jupiter Chamber Players. In 2015, Trio Settecento released Veracini's Complete Sonate Accademiche for Violin and Continuo. The Trio's Grand Tour collection of four CDs on Cedille Records takes listeners on a country-by-country of the European Baroque.

Her principal instrument is the 1742 'ex-Bazzini, Soldat' violin of Guarneri del Gesu. For seventeenth- and eighteenth-century pieces, she has often used an unaltered 1770 instrument of Nicolò Gagliano I.

Her taste in rock runs to heavy metal, with AC/DC, Anthrax, Black Sabbath, Led Zeppelin, Megadeth, Metallica, Motörhead, Pantera, Slayer, and Van Halen being among her favorites. She has met and played with a number of these groups. In 1997, she released a heavy-metal-inspired recording. "In practicing and preparing those songs, I discovered that a lot of the heavy metal I'd been listening to was some of the most sophisticated compositionally of all rock music, and very inspired by classical music," Pine has said, "Then all these people in ripped jeans started coming to my concerts."

In February 2009, she joined the thrash/doom metal band Earthen Grave, where she performs on a six-string Viper electric violin. The band has shared the stage with metal bands such as Pentagram, Black Label Society, Mayhem, and Nachtmystium. The group released an EP, Dismal Times. Doommantia.com proclaimed that Earthen Grave has "all the songwriting capabilities to make one of the best albums ever." and HellrideMusic.com said "If the doom gods are with us, this band will stay around and continue to produce the kind of unique, powerful and thoughtful music contained on Dismal Times." Pine credits her experience playing in a rock band with improving her emotional rapport with her audiences.

Pine often brings a new twist to her coaching sessions with chamber music and youth orchestras, by incorporating orchestral versions of rock pieces into her sessions. For example, Pine offered the world premiere of her own arrangement of Metallica's "Master of Puppets" with the McHenry County Youth Symphony (Crystal Lake, IL) in November 2009. In May 2015, she premiered her "Shredding with the Symphony" program with the Lafayette Symphony, which features music from Shostakovich, Bruch, Beethoven, Vivaldi, Sibelius, and Paganini as well as Van Halen, AC/DC, Black Sabbath, Rush, Nirvana, Metallica and Led Zeppelin.

Bill McGlaughlin called her a "musical Pac-Man" for her ability to take in and perform so many different kinds of music. She has often performed at schools and on rock music radio stations in an effort to interest younger audiences in classical music.

Pine was inducted as an honorary member of Sigma Alpha Iota in 2003. She performed at the music fraternity's 45th national convention during summer 2009 in Chicago.

On July 11, 2010, Pine gave a three-part performance at Chicago's Millennium Park as part of the Great Performers of Illinois celebration. After initially performing on baroque violin with Trio Settecento, she soloed in the Tchaikovsky Violin Concerto with the Illinois Symphony Orchestra and then switched gears again to perform in black leather on her electric violin with Earthen Grave. In conjunction with the event, she received the 2010 Great Performer of Illinois award.

In 2010, Pine participated in a tribute album titled Mister Bolin's Late Night Revival, a compilation of 17 previously unreleased tracks written by guitar legend Tommy Bolin prior to his death in 1976. The CD includes other artists such as HiFi Superstar, Doogie White, Eric Martin, Troy Luccketta, Jeff Pilson, Randy Jackson, Rex Carroll, Derek St. Holmes, Kimberley Dahme, and The 77's. A percentage of the proceeds from this project will benefit the Jackson Recovery Centers.

== Rachel Barton Pine Foundation ==
Pine started a foundation in 2001 to promote the study and appreciation of classical music, including string music by black composers such as Jessie Montgomery, Edward W. Hardy, Coleridge-Taylor Perkinson and Wynton Marsalis. It prepares music curricula on black composers, loans high-quality instruments to deserving young musicians, and provides grants to cover incidental expenses (such as for supplemental lessons, accompanists, sheet music, travel, competition entrance fees, instrument repair, and audition recordings) of students and young professional musicians. Another program, Global HeartStrings, is dedicated to supporting aspiring classical musicians from developing countries. In this effort, Barton Pine has been aided by a younger sister, Hannah Barton, also a violinist.

In 2006, after being nominated by Chicago Mayor Richard M. Daley, Barton Pine received the Studs Terkel Humanities Service Award for her work through the foundation. She has also been given the 2012 Karl Haas Prize for Music Education for this work and her other education-related efforts.

A Stradivarius violin, the 'Arkwright Lady Rebecca Sylvan', was donated to the foundation by Joseph Sylvan in 2015.

== Metra accident ==
On January 16, 1995, Pine was severely injured in a train accident in the Chicago suburb of Winnetka, where she taught violin lessons. As she was exiting a Metra commuter train with her violin over her shoulder, the doors closed on the strap to her case, pinning her left shoulder to the train. The doors, which were controlled remotely and had no safety sensors, failed to reopen, and she was dragged 366 feet (112 meters) by the train before being pulled underneath and run over, one leg severed and the other mangled. She was saved by the prompt application of tourniquets by several passengers who disembarked from the train after pulling its emergency brake handles.

Pine sued Metra and the Chicago and North Western Transportation Company for compensation for her injuries and legal and medical expenses. Metra argued that she made the choice not to extricate her arm from the strap of the violin case out of regard for the instrument, a 400-year-old Amati valued at around $500,000, and thus she carried most of the blame for her injuries. The jury ruled in Pine's favor. Metra changed its conductor safety procedures following the incident and made other changes to the trains themselves.

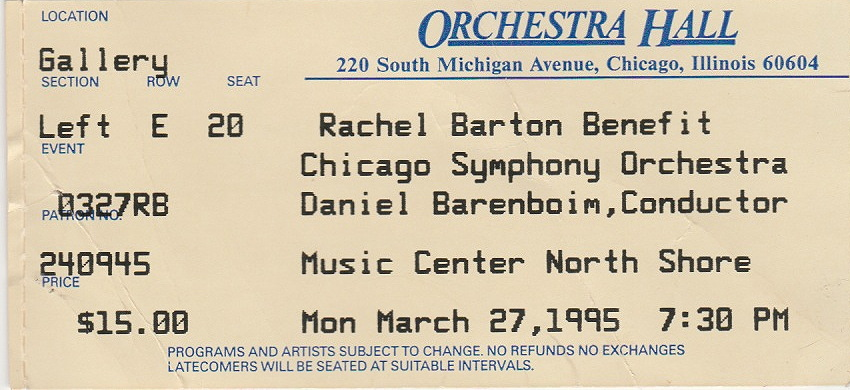

Daniel Barenboim, the conductor of the Chicago Symphony Orchestra, organized a benefit concert and raised over $75,000 after she was injured. After a two-year hiatus to allow for recovery from her injuries, aided by numerous surgeries and physical therapy, Pine resumed her career.

== Personal life ==
In 2004, Barton married Greg Pine, a health care consulting firm CEO and former minor league baseball pitcher. They have one daughter, Sylvia, who is also an accomplished violinist and composer, and sometimes performs with her mother.

== Discography ==
- Homage to Sarasate with Samuel Sanders (piano) – Dorian Recordings, 1994: DOR-90183
- George Frideric Handel: The Sonatas for Violin & Continuo with David Schrader (harpsichord) and John Mark Rozendaal (cello) – Cedille Records, 1996: CDR 90000 032
- Liszt: Works for Violin and Piano with Thomas Labé (Piano) – Dorian Recordings, 1997: DOR-90251
- Violin Concertos by Black Composers of the 18th and 19th Centuries with the Encore Chamber Orchestra; Daniel Hege, conductor – Cedille Records, 1997: CDR 90000 035
- Stringendo: Storming the Citadel with Edgar Gabriel (violin) and Brandon Vamos (cello) – Cacophony Records, 1997
- Instrument of the Devil with Patrick Sinozich (piano), David Schrader (harpsichord), John Mark Rozendaal (cello) and John Bruce Yeh (clarinet) – Cedille Records, 1998: CDR 90000 041
- Double Play: Twentieth Century Duos for Violin and Cello with Wendy Warner (cello) – Cedille Records, 1998: CDR 90000 047
- Brahms and Joachim Violin Concertos with the Chicago Symphony Orchestra; Carlos Kalmar, conductor – Cedille Records, 2002: CDR 90000 068
- Introduction, Theme, and Variations on "God Defend New Zealand" – Cacophony Records, 2002
- Solo Baroque – Cedille Records, 2004: CDR 90000 078
- Scottish Fantasies for Violin and Orchestra with Alasdair Fraser (fiddle) and the Scottish Chamber Orchestra; Alexander Platt, conductor – Cedille Records, 2004: CDR 90000 083
- American Virtuosa: Tribute to Maud Powell with Matthew Hagle (piano) – Cedille Records, 2006: CDR 90000 097
- An Italian Sojourn by Trio Settecento, with David Schrader (harpsichord) and John Mark Rozendaal (baroque cello) – Cedille Records, 2007: CDR 90000 099
- Beethoven & Clement Violin Concertos with the Royal Philharmonic Orchestra; José Serebrier, conductor – Cedille Records, 2008: CDR 90000 106
- Dismal Times by Earthen Grave, with Mark Weiner (vocals), Tony Spillman (guitar), Jason Muxlow (guitar), Ron Holzner (bass, vocals), and Scott Davidson (drums) – 2009
- A German Bouquet by Trio Settecento, with David Schrader (harpsichord and organ) and John Mark Rozendaal (viola da gamba and baroque cello) – Cedille Records, 2009: CDR 90000 114
- Glazunov: Complete Concertos with the Russian National Orchestra; José Serebrier, conductor – Warner Classics, 2011: 2564 67946-5
- Capricho Latino with Héctor Elizondo, narrator – Cedille Records, 2011: CDR 90000 124
- A French Soirée by Trio Settecento, with David Schrader (harpsichord) and John Mark Rozendaal (viola da gamba) – Cedille Records, 2011: CDR 90000 129
- Xavier Montsalvatge: Canciones und Conciertos with Jenny Lin (piano), Lucia Duchoňová (mezzo-soprano), and the NDR Radiophilharmonie Hannover; Celso Antunes, conductor – Hänssler Classic, 2012: 098.642.000
- Earthen Grave by Earthen Grave, with Mark Weiner (vocals), Tony Spillman (guitar), Jason Muxlow (guitar), Ron Holzner (bass, vocals), Scott Davidson (drums) and guest vocalist Kristin Joy Elane – Claude and Elmo Music, 2012: CECD001 Reissued with additional tracks by Ripple Music (2013)
- An English Fancy by Trio Settecento, with David Schrader (harpsichord and positiv organ) and John Mark Rozendaal (viola da gamba) – Cedille Records, 2012: CDR 90000 135
- Violin Lullabies with Matthew Hagle (piano) – Cedille Records, 2013: CDR 90000 139
- Mendelssohn & Schumann Violin Concertos, Beethoven Romances with the Göttinger Symphonieorchester; Christoph-Mathias Mueller, conductor; Cedille Records, 2013: CDR 90000 144
- Grand Tour by Trio Settecento, with David Schrader (harpsichord and organ) and John Mark Rozendaal (viola da gamba and baroque cello) – Cedille Records, 2013: CDR Box 1002
- Mozart: Complete Violin Concertos, Sinfonia Concertante K364 with Matthew Lipman (viola) and the Academy of St Martin in the Fields; Sir Neville Marriner, conductor – Avie Records, 2015: B00OYKL03
- Veracini: Complete Sonate Accademiche by Trio Settecento, with David Schrader (harpsichord) and John Mark Rozendaal (cello) – Cedille Records, 2015: CDR 90000 155
- Vivaldi: The Complete Viola d'Amore Concertos with Ars Antigua and Hopkinson Smith (lute) – Cedille Records, 2015: CDR 90000 159
- Testament: Complete Sonatas and Partitas for Solo Violin by J. S. Bach – Avie Records, 2016: AV2360
- Bel Canto Paganini: 24 Caprices and Other Works for Solo Violin – Avie Records, 2017: AV2374
- Elgar, Bruch Violin Concertos with the BBC Symphony Orchestra; Andrew Litton, conductor – Avie Records, 2018: AV2375
- J.S. Bach: The Sonatas for Violin & Harpsichord with Jory Vinikour (harpsichord) – Cedille Records, 2018: CDR 90000 177
- Blues Dialogues: Music by Black Composers with Matthew Hagle (piano) – Cedille Records, 2018: CDR 90000 182
- Dvořák, Khachaturian Violin Concertos with the Royal Scottish National Orchestra; Teddy Abrams, conductor – Avie Records, 2019: AV2411
- Violin Concertos by Black Composers Through the Centuries with Encore Chamber Orchestra; Royal Scottish National Orchestra, cond. Jonathon Heyward. Cedille Records, 2022: CDR 90000 214
- Corelli: 12 Violin Sonatas op. 5 with Brandon Acker, David Schrader and John Mark Rozendaal – Cedille Records, 2024: CDR 90000 23
