= WBAB Homegrown Album =

Compilation album
- Released: 1981
- Genre: Album Oriented Rock, Pop, Progressive rock, Heavy Metal,
- Label: Broken/The Radio Company

WBAB Homegrown Album is the first compilation album recorded for WBAB-FM in Babylon, New York. The album was manufactured in 1981 at PRI Record Pressing in Wyandanch, New York. It was designed to commemorate some of the station's best local acts and performances culled from the station's "Homegrown Hour" program, a show dedicated to promoting bands based on, or somehow tied to Long Island, New York.

The album contains songs by The Good Rats, Twisted Sister, and Zebra, among others, and was partially attributed to the success of these bands. The recording of Zebra's first hit "Who's Behind the Door?," is an earlier version not found on their own 1983 debut album. It also contains songs written by some of the station's disc jockeys, as well as an extended version of the station's jingle. One of the more interesting tracks was Random Speed's "Radio Active Baby Food", a novelty song partially inspired by the 1979 Three Mile Island accident, and the Long Island Lighting Company's controversially proposed Shoreham Nuclear Power Plant. The band included members Chris Seefried and Gary DeRosa who later recorded under the moniker Gods Child, for Warner Brothers and Joe 90 for Geffen records respectively. Swift Kick featured future Saraya members Tony Bruno (also with Danger Danger and Rihanna) and Chuck Bonfante and was NOT the band with the same name and active around the same time which had future Dio member Tracy G on guitar.

One year later, in 1982, the station released a second album called "Son of Homegrown," which was pressed on red vinyl and like the first album it contained a unique recording of a Twisted Sister song, this time "Can't Stop Rock and Roll" which went on to become the title track of the band's 1983 album "You Can't Stop Rock'n'Roll". A third album from 1984 was known as "WBAB Homegrown '84:" a.k.a. "Homegrown: The Next Generation," some copies including a WBAB Homegrown picture disc. Neither this album, nor the next two were ever re-released on CD.

A scan of the back cover of the “WBAB Homegrown Album” from 1981.

== Tracks ==
Side One

1. Glad to Have You Back (Beethoven) - Good Rats
2. Dream Away - Thrills
3. Action/Fraction - The Lines
4. Bad Boys of Rock 'n Roll - Twisted Sister
5. Suicide - Swift Kick
6. Barbed Wire - Fanatics

Side Two

1. Who's Behind the Door? - Zebra
2. Undercover Lover - Broken Arrow
3. Landslide - Llama
4. Love on a Shelf - Stanton Anderson Band
5. Radio Active Baby Food - Random Speed
6. The WBAB Bong Island Blues - Marc Coppola & Al Vertucci
7. Show the World You Love Rock 'n Roll - Joe Costanzo

== Failed tracks ==
Besides Long Island–based musicians, the album also boasted a failed attempt to gain an unorthodox series of tracks. Apparently, they consisted of a cover of Ozzy Osbourne's "Mr. Crowley" by The Osmonds, "Love Is All Around" (The Theme from The Mary Tyler Moore Show), by Judas Priest, a cover of The Doors song "Roadhouse Blues" by Johann Sebastian Bach, "Jeremy Bendover" by Emerson, Lake & Curley, "Can't You See the Freebird, Jessica?" by The Marshall Skynyrd Band (evidently a duet between members of the Marshall Tucker Band and Lynyrd Skynyrd), and an untitled Medley that was supposedly recorded live at Hammerheads in 1980 by The Beatles.
