= Rex Carroll =

American guitarist

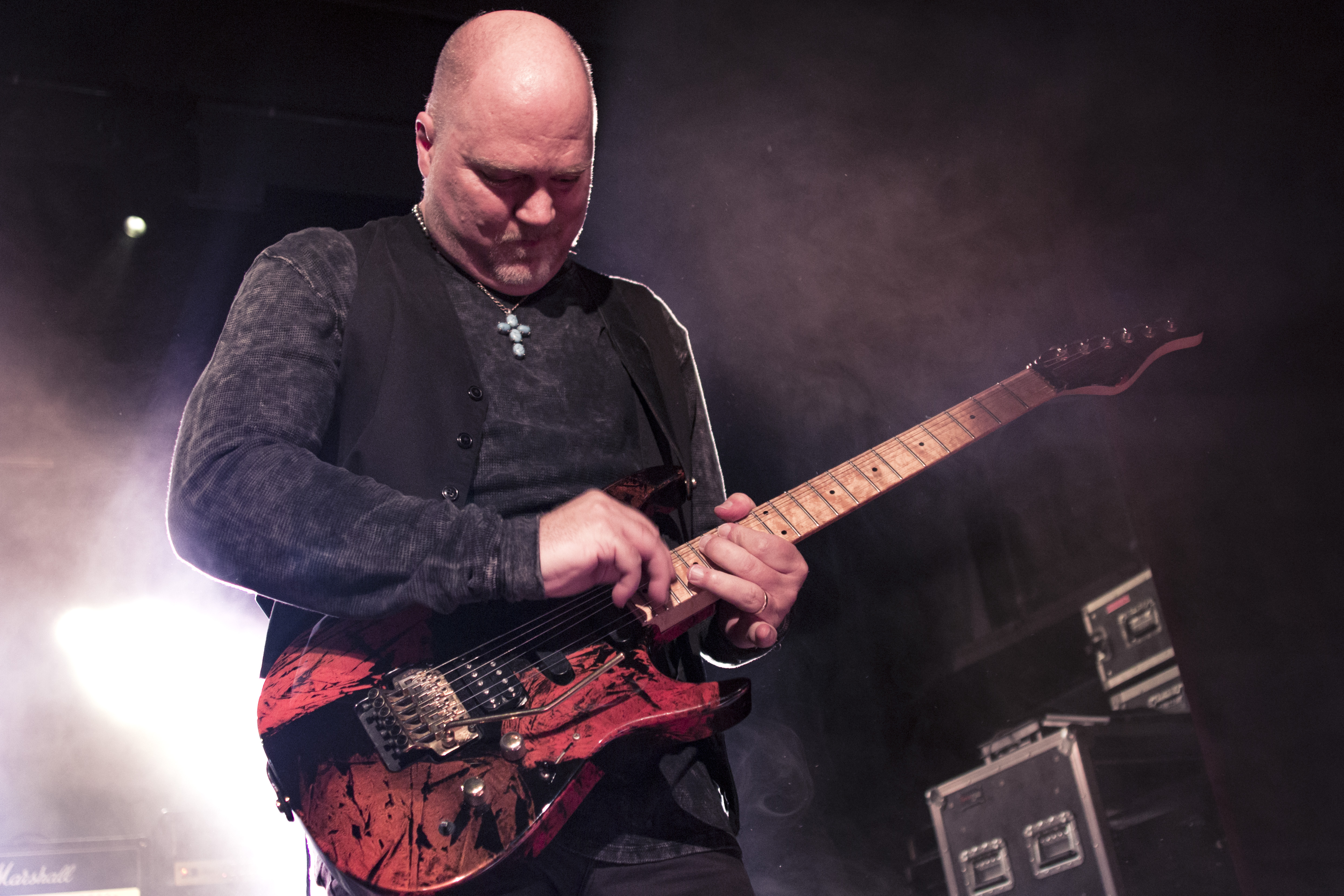
- Carroll in 2017

Background information
- Genres: Heavy metal
- Occupation(s): Musician, songwriter
- Instrument: Guitar

Rex Carroll is an American guitarist known for his work in the Christian metal band Whitecross. He is also the leader and guitarist of other bands including Fierce Heart, King James and the Rex Carroll Band. He also filled in and did all the guitar work on Eden's 1994 album Fan The Flame.

== Career ==
=== Whitecross ===
In Whitecross, Carroll is not only the lead guitarist, but is also the primary songwriter. With Whitecross, he has completed six world tours and in 1989 they were the first American rock band to perform in Guatemala City. Whitecross won two Dove Awards for "Metal Album of the Year" in 1990 and 1992.

=== Other ===
Carroll has recorded numerous sound libraries, many of which have been picked up for use by ESPN for their NFL highlights, as well as Season One of the Anna Nicole Show. His playing has been heard on commercials for the Milwaukee Bucks, and he also performed the National Anthem at the Harley-Davidson 100th anniversary celebration. In June 2004, he placed third in the North American Rock Guitar Competition sponsored by Guitar Player magazine and WNED/New York. Carroll holds a bachelor's degree in classical guitar performance from Northern Illinois University.

In 2010, Rex participated in a tribute album titled Mister Bolin's Late Night Revival, a compilation of 17 previously unreleased tracks written by guitar legend Tommy Bolin prior to his death in 1976. The CD includes other artists such as HiFi Superstar, Doogie White, Eric Martin, Troy Luccketta, Jeff Pilson, Randy Jackson, Rachel Barton, Derek St. Holmes, Kimberley Dahme, and The 77's. A percentage of the proceeds from this project will benefit the Jackson Recovery Centers.

In 2017, Rex and Whitecross and King James bandmate Mike Feighan joined with David Bach and Jamie Rowe of Guardian to record Revival, a new compilation of Whitecross and Guardian tracks and went on a short tour to promote the project.

== Discography ==
=== Solo ===
- 1995: The Sessions
- 2010: That Was Then, This Is Now (as The Rex Carroll Band)

=== Whitecross ===
- 1987: Whitecross
- 1988: Love on the Line
- 1988: Hammer & Nail
- 1989: Triumphant Return
- 1991: In the Kingdom
- 1992: High Gear
- 2005: Nineteen Eighty Seven
- 2024: Fear No Evil

=== King James ===
- 1994: King James
- 1997: The Fall
- 2013: MaXimus

=== Other ===
- 1985: Fierce Heart, Fierce Heart (guitar and vocals)
- 1994: Fan the Flame, Eden (guitar, rereleased in 2004)
- 2017: Revival, The Great Whitecross & Guardian
- 2020: "War For The World", Fierce Heart (guitar and backing vocals)

=== Guest ===
- 2001: Karaoke Superstars, Superchick (guitar on "Alright (Respect to the Old Skool Mix)")
- 2010: Mr. Bolin's Late Night Revival (guitar on "Glory Train")
- 2014: Onward to Freedom, Tourniquet (guitar on "Let the Wild Just Be Wild")
