= 3.V =

Studio album by Zebra
- Released: May 1986
- Studios: Atlantic, Unique Recording, New York City; Boogie Hotel, Kingdom Sound, Long Island
- Genres: Hard rock, heavy metal
- Length: 40:26
- Label: Atlantic
- Producers: Randy Jackson, Zebra

Zebra chronology
| No Tellin' Lies (1984) | 3.V (1986) | Live (1990) |

Professional ratings
Review scores
| Source | Rating |
|---|---|
| AllMusic | 4.5/5 stars |
| Kerrang! | 5/5 stars |

3.V is the third studio album by American hard rock band Zebra, released in 1986 by Atlantic Records. The album failed to chart – it would be the group's last studio album for Atlantic before being dropped from the label, and their last full-length studio album for 17 years, until Zebra IV in 2003. The album went out-of-print by early 1989. It was reissued in 2007 as an import paired on one CD with No Tellin' Lies, another deleted title, as the stand-alone compact disc version became a scarce collector's item in the meantime. 3.V, along with the first two Zebra albums, was reissued on CD again in Japan in 2013. In 2016 Rock Candy Records reissued the album on CD.

== Reception ==
Some critics have heralded this to be the best Zebra album, even better than their debut. Doug Stone from AllMusic gave the album 4.5 stars, saying "3.V has that certain something extra: more than an album, 3.V opens the mind of an unheralded genius." Classic Rock Review wrote that the album was "plagued by clusters of both mediocrity as well as pure brilliance" but "includes some of the band's finest work".

== Track listing ==
All tracks were written by Randy Jackson

| No. | Title | Length |
|---|---|---|
| 1. | "Can't Live Without" | 3:40 |
| 2. | "He's Making You the Fool" | 3:52 |
| 3. | "Time" | 5:21 |
| 4. | "Your Mind's Open" | 3:37 |
| 5. | "Better Not Call" | 5:04 |
| 6. | "You'll Never Know" | 2:59 |
| 7. | "About to Make the Time" | 4:57 |
| 8. | "You're Only Losing Your Heart" | 3:48 |
| 9. | "Hard Living Without You" | 3:21 |
| 10. | "Isn't That the Way" | 3:16 |

== Personnel ==
- Randy Jackson – guitar, lead vocals, Prophet 5 synthesizer
- Felix Hanemann – bass, backing vocals, keyboards
- Guy Gelso – drums, backing vocals, percussion

== Production ==
- Arranged & Produced by Randy Jackson & Zebra
- Stephen Benben, Jamie Chaleff, Ken Collins, Ellen Fitton, Ira McLaughlin, Dan Nash - engineers
- Mitchell Frondelli, Dan Nash – mixing
