= Triumphant Return =

Studio album by Whitecross
- Released: January 31, 1989
- Genre: Christian metal
- Label: Star Song
- Producer: Joey Powers

Whitecross chronology
Hammer & Nail (1988)	Triumphant Return (1989)	In the Kingdom (1991)

Triumphant Return is the third album from the Christian metal band Whitecross, released on January 31, 1989. It reached No. 13 on Billboard's Top Contemporary Christian Albums chart. The album won the 1990 Dove Award for Hard Music Album of the Year.

== Track listing ==
No.	Title	Length
1.	"Attention Please"	3:55
2.	"Red Light"	4:34
3.	"Straight Through the Heart"	3:58
4.	"Down"	4:04
5.	"Behold"	4:36
6.	"Shakedown"	4:18
7.	"Flashpoint"	1:00
8.	"Simple Man"	4:32
9.	"Over the Top"	4:19
10.	"Heaven's Calling Tonight"	4:16

== Band members ==
- Scott Wenzel – vocals
- Rex Carroll – guitars
- Rick Armstrong – bass
- Mike Elliot – drums
