= Randy Jackson (Zebra) =

American rock musician (born 1955)

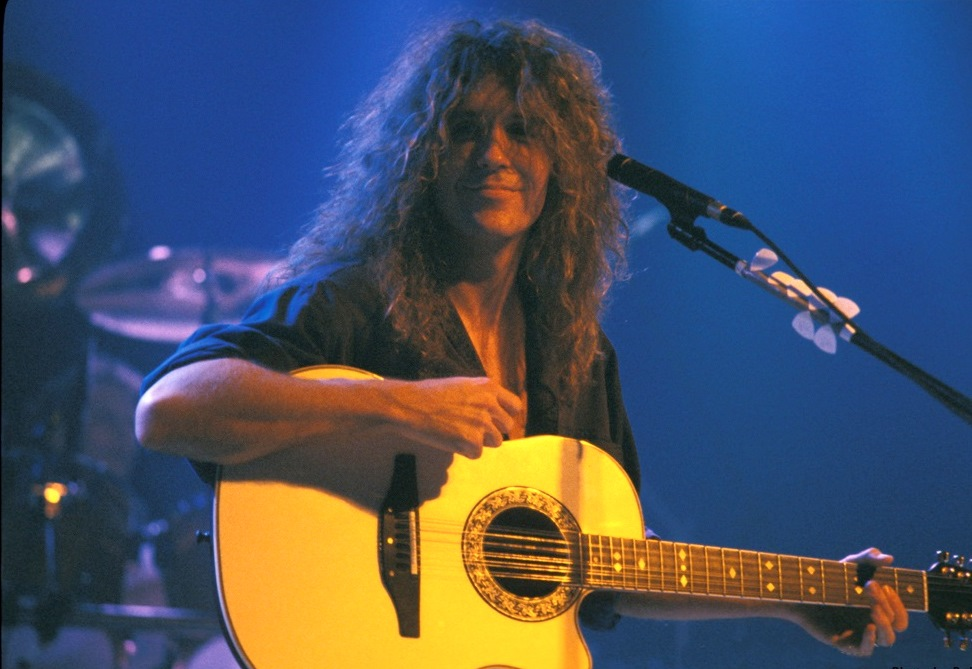
- Jackson in 2010

Background information
- Born: February 28, 1955 (age 71); New Orleans, Louisiana, U.S.
- Genres: Hard rock, heavy metal, progressive rock, acoustic rock
- Occupation: Musician
- Instruments: Vocals, guitar, keyboards, synthesizer, piano, mellotron, percussion
- Years active: 1975–present
- Label: Atlantic
- Member of: Zebra
- Formerly of: Shepards Bush, Jefferson Airplane, The Sign, Randy Jackson's China Rain

Randy Jackson (born February 28, 1955) is an American musician, best known as frontman for the rock band Zebra. He was born and raised in New Orleans. In addition to his career with Zebra, he is a Long Island Music Hall of Fame inductee, a Louisiana Music Hall of Fame inductee, and has toured with Jefferson Airplane and tributes to Led Zeppelin, Pink Floyd and The Doors.

== Career ==
In 1973, Jackson joined Shepards Bush as lead guitarist. It was here that he met Felix Hanemann. Hanemann worked at Jazz City Studios in New Orleans owned by Cosimo Matassa. Shepards Bush recorded a demo at the studio which was Jackson's first experience in a recording studio. Jackson and Hanemann left Shepards Bush a year later. They soon met drummer Guy Gelso and formed "Zebra" in 1975. It was at this point that Jackson started singing lead vocals. After playing the New Orleans area for two years, Zebra moved to Long Island in New York in 1977 and dedicated themselves to playing in that area's club and college scene, mainly as a cover band. Even with their limited selection of original music. Zebra was talented enough to impress Atlantic Records, who signed the group to a five album deal right out of the gate in late 1982.

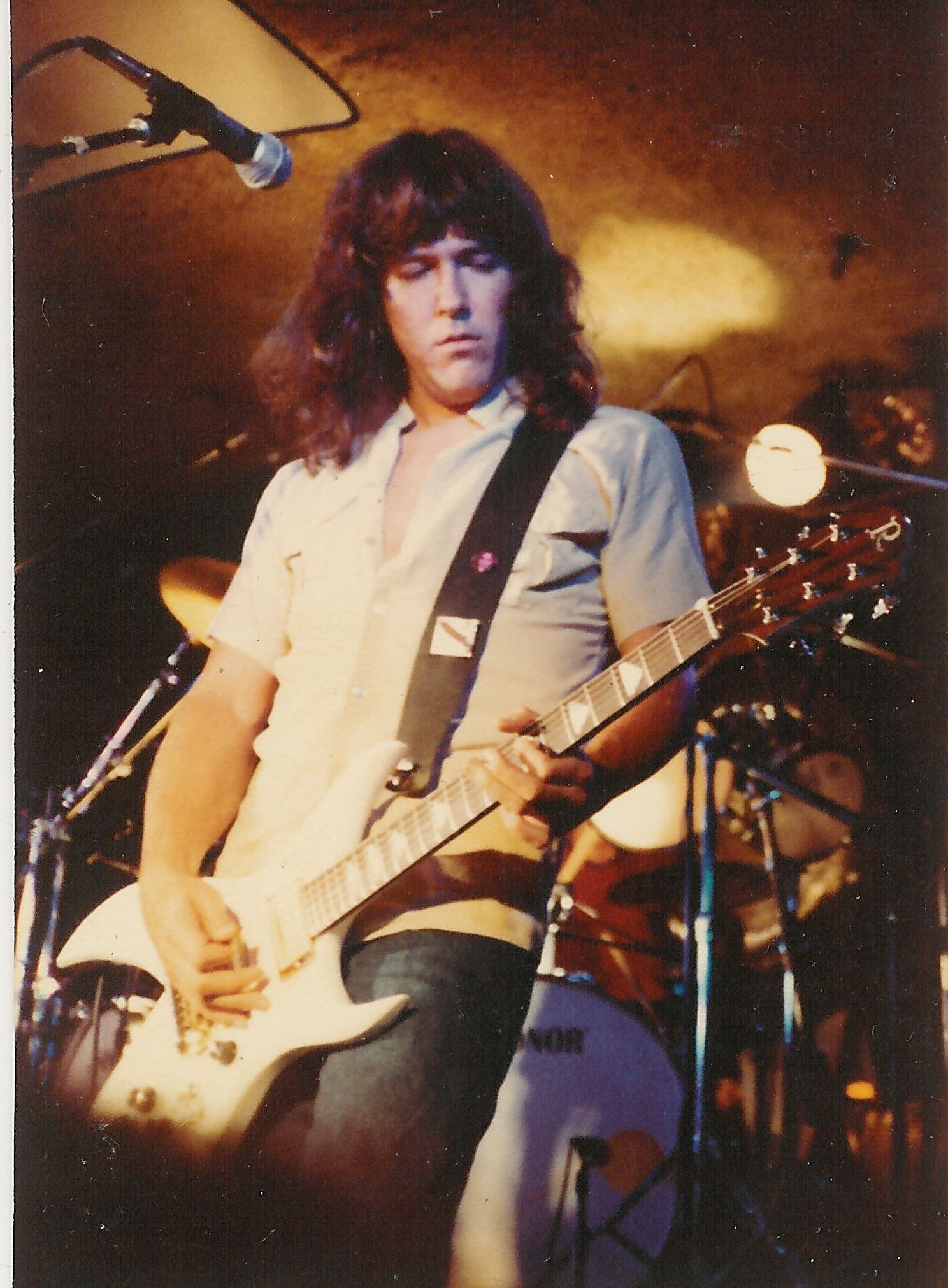
Jackson at the Long Island Club Rockaways in 1983

Their first album, Zebra was produced by Jack Douglas, went gold and was the fastest selling debut album in the history of Atlantic Records. Zebra sold over 75,000 copies in its first week and spent eight months on the Billboard charts, peaked at number 29. During the next couple of years Zebra played opener for Aerosmith, Journey, ZZ Top, Loverboy, Cheap Trick, Sammy Hagar and REO Speedwagon.

The group has produced five albums and five videos with combined sales of over 2,000,000.

In addition to working with Zebra, Jackson performs lead vocals for The Music of Led Zeppelin, The Music of Pink Floyd and The Music of The Doors; tributes to the eponymous bands as backed by an orchestra. He also frequently plays live acoustic shows across the country.

In 1989, Jackson got a call from drummer Kenny Aronoff to join him and tour playing guitar and keyboards with the original Jefferson Airplane (Grace Slick, Marty Balin, Paul Kantner, Jorma Kaukonen and Jack Casady) on their U.S. reunion tour.

Randy Jackson's China Rain, a project that featured songs co-written with Mark Slaughter and Jack Ponti was released in 1991 in North America, Europe and Japan.

In 1992, Jackson started performing "Solo" live with the use of a Macintosh SE/30 computer he programmed to perform the drums, bass and keyboards, and called it "The Midi Show". He also programmed the computer to run the sound mix and lights during the show. He toured all over the southern and the northeastern U.S. with the show.

From 1992 to 1996, Jackson was involved with Lonestar Technologies (Long Island) in the hardware and software development of an Interactive Multimedia Musical Instrument called "The Key" which allows anyone to play music instantly. Jon Anderson of "Yes" used "The Key" to perform live and wrote many songs with the instrument during that time.

Jackson completed work on Zebra IV which was released on July 8, 2003. He produced and engineered the entire album.

The Sign were formed by Mark Mangold (Drive), Randy Jackson (Zebra), Terry Brock (Strangeways), Billy Greer (Kansas) and Bobby Rondinelli (Rainbow & Black Sabbath). Their début album, released in 2000, was Signs Of Life. Their second album, The Second Coming, for which Jackson co-wrote songs and shared vocals, was released in August 2005 on Frontiers Records.

In 2005, Jackson sang on three tracks on the album: "Subdivisions: A Tribute to Rush." The tracks were "Distant Early Warning," "Subdivisions," and "A Farewell to Kings."

Jackson sang The National Anthem at Shea Stadium in Flushing, New York on July 7, 2006.

On July 10, 2010, Zebra was inducted into the Louisiana Music Hall of Fame. On October 18, 2012, Zebra was inducted into the Long Island Music Hall of Fame.

In 2010, Jackson participated in a tribute album titled Mister Bolin's Late Night Revival, a compilation of 17 previously unreleased tracks written by guitarist Tommy Bolin prior to his death in 1976. The CD includes other artists such as HiFi Superstar, Doogie White, Eric Martin, Troy Luccketta, Jeff Pilson, Rachel Barton, Rex Carroll, Derek St. Holmes, Kimberley Dahme, and The 77's. "A percentage of the proceeds from this project will benefit the Jackson Recovery Centers." The Center is located in Tommy Bolin's home town of Sioux City, Iowa and is not named for Randy Jackson.

On February 4, 2014, Empathy for the Walrus was released by Red River Records. Jackson produced and engineered Empathy For The Walrus, playing all instruments and singing all the parts.

In late 2014, Jackson recorded "What it Feels Like" with Silvergun, (Note: In March 2015, Silvergun was renamed Ashes of Eagles.) an American rock band from Dallas, Texas, starring Darren "DPaul" Wise of The Drew Pearson Show band.

In February of 2026, Jackson performed lead vocals in collaboration with the Minnesota Orchestra in The Music of Pink Floyd.

== Discography ==
=== Albums ===
- Zebra (1983) (Gold)
- No Tellin' Lies (1984)
- 3.V (1986)
- Live (1990)
- Randy Jackson's China Rain: Bed of Nails (1991)
- The Best of Zebra: In Black and White (1998)
- King Biscuit Flower Hour (1999)
- Zebra IV (2003)
- Empathy for the Walrus (2014)

=== Contributions ===
- "What it Feels Like" – Silvergun (2015)

== Video albums and concert films ==
- Zebra Videos And More VHS (1999)
- Zebra The DVD (2007)
