= Unveiled (Whitecross album) =

Studio album by Whitecross
- Released: August 23, 1994
- Genre: Christian rock, hard rock, alternative rock
- Label: R.E.X.
- Producer: Jimmie Lee Sloas

Whitecross chronology
High Gear (1992)	Unveiled (1994)	Equilibrium (1995)

Professional ratings
Review scores
Source	Rating
AllMusic	2.5/5 stars

Unveiled is the sixth album by Christian metal band Whitecross, released in 1994. It reached No. 18 on Billboard's Top Contemporary Christian Albums chart. The album was produced by Jimmie Lee Sloas.

The song, "Come Unto the Light", won a Dove Award for Hard Music Song of the Year at the 25th GMA Dove Awards in 1994.

Unveiled was re-issued in 2005 by Retroactive Records, featuring demo versions of two songs from the debut album, Whitecross .

== Track listing ==
1. "Frank" [intro] – 0:20
2. "If You Believe" – 5:00
3. "Home in Heaven" – 3:05
4. "Good Bye Cruel World" – 5:32
5. "Angel's Disguise" – 4:06
6. "I Keep Prayin" – 4:36
7. "Come Unto the Light" – 4:21
8. "Groove" [instrumental] – 0:32
9. "King of Angels" – 3:52
10. "Salt City" – 3:32
11. "Right Before Your Eyes" – 4:05
12. "No Other Love" – 4:29

=== 2005 re-issue ===
13. "Lookin' for a Reason" (demo version)
14. "He Is the Rock" (demo version)

== Band members ==
- Scott Wenzel - Vocals
- Barry Graul - Guitars
- Tracy Ferrie - Bass
- Mike Feighan - Drums
