= Joey Powers =

American singer (1934–2017)

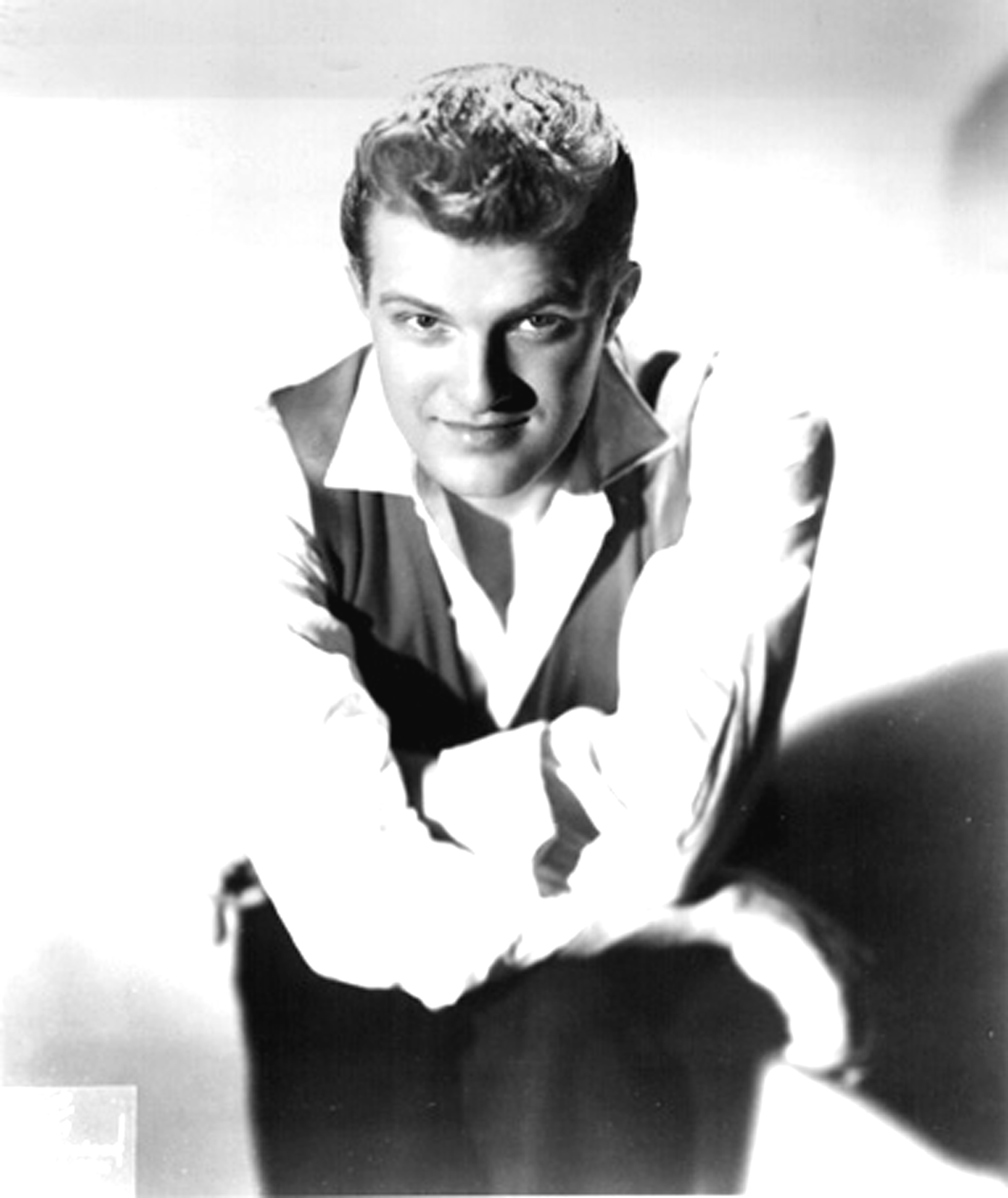

Background information
- Also known as: Joey Rogers
- Born: Joseph S. Ruggiero; December 7, 1934; Washington, Pennsylvania, U.S.
- Died: January 20, 2017 (aged 82) Washington, Pennsylvania
- Genres: Pop music
- Occupations: Singer, songwriter, record producer
- Instruments: Vocals, guitar
- Years active: Mid-1950s–early 1970s (as performer)
- Labels: Nu-Clear, ABC, RCA, Amy

Joseph S. "Joe" Ruggiero (December 7, 1934 – January 20, 2017), who performed as Joey Powers, was an American pop singer and songwriter whose record "Midnight Mary" reached No. 10 on the Billboard Hot 100 in early January 1964. Powers had no further hits and is known as a "one hit wonder". He later became a booking agent, recording studio owner, record producer, and church leader.

== Biography ==
Powers was born in Washington, Pennsylvania and graduated from Washington High School in 1953. He won a wrestling scholarship to Ohio State University before returning to Pennsylvania, where he recorded three singles for the Nu-Clear and ABC labels under the name Joey Rogers in 1958. However, none were successful. At one time, he played in a band with Bobby Vinton.

In 1959, Powers he moved to New York City. Through an introduction by family friend Perry Como, he secured a job at NBC. His singing was heard by songwriter and record producer Paul Vance, who signed him to RCA Records and changed his name to Joey Powers to avoid confusion with singer Jimmy Rodgers. Powers released several singles produced by Vance, again without success, and returned to Ohio State University to complete his degree and work as a wrestling coach.

However, after ending his contract with Vance in 1963, Powers did a demo recording of "Midnight Mary", written by Artie Wayne and Ben Raleigh. The demo was heard by Paul Simon (then recording as Jerry Landis) who recommended it to record label owner Larry Uttal. The lyrics of "Midnight Mary" were inspired by Jamela, the beautiful daughter of a deposed general who was exiled to the US along with the Shah of Iran. The song was intended for the Everly Brothers, but they turned it down.

Released as a single by Amy Records, Powers' recording rose up the national charts, entering the Hot 100's top 40 at #36 on Powers' 29th birthday and reaching #10 at the start of 1964. Lorna Dune's nearly note-for-note answer record "Midnight Joey" followed soon after.

Powers quickly recorded an album, Midnight Mary — in the week of John F. Kennedy's assassination — with musicians including Paul Simon and Roger McGuinn. He also recorded Special Delivery with Roy Orbison and country/folk musician Bobby Bare. However, these and subsequent recordings were generally ignored because the public preferred other acts, especially the Beatles and British Invasion bands.

In 1967, Powers released a single credited to Joey Powers and The New Dimensions. He formed a new band, Joey Powers' Flower which performed around Pennsylvania and New Jersey and released several singles on the RCA label in 1969-70, without success. He later ran a booking agency in Hazlet, New Jersey and a recording studio in West Orange, New Jersey used by musicians including Jethro Tull, Tony Orlando, Steve Allen, The Kinks and Aerosmith. He managed the band Phantom's Opera that included Richie Sambora, Tico Torres and Alec John Such, later of Bon Jovi, and helped produce a solo album by drummer Joe English.

In the early 1990s, Powers sold the recording studio and returned to college to study theology, later becoming an ordained minister, and setting up the Bayshore Gospel church in Keyport, New Jersey. Powers moved to Saint Petersburg, Russia in 2002 where he set up a Christian orphanage and built a recording studio. He later returned to the US.

For the album Triumphant Return by Christian rock group Whitecross, Powers won a Gospel Music Association Dove Award for Album of the Year in 1991.

== Death ==
Ruggiero died January 20, 2017, in Washington, Pennsylvania at age 82. He was survived by his three children and extended family.

== Discography ==
=== Singles ===
Year	Title	Peak chart positions		Record Label	B-side	Album
Year	Title	US Pop	US AC	Record Label	B-side	Album
1958	"Bumble Bee"	—	—	Nu-Clear	"Who Can Explain It Then"	
1958	"Jeannine"	—	—	Nu-Clear	"They Didn't Believe Me"	
1960	"My Bible Belt"	—	—	ABC-Paramount	"Don't Go Away Mad"	
1962	"Jenny, Won't You Walk Up?"	—	—	RCA Victor	"Two Tickets and a Candy Heart"	
1962	"Don't Envy Me"	—	—	RCA Victor	"Me, Myself and I"	
1963	"Midnight Mary"	10	7	Amy	"Where Do You Want the World Delivered"	Midnight Mary
1964	"Billy Old Buddy"	—	—	Amy	"In the Morning Gloria"	
1964	"You Comb Her Hair"	—	—	Amy	"Love Is a Season"	
1964	"Where Did the Summer Go"	—	—	Amy	"Tears Keep Falling"	
1965	"I Love You"	—	—	MGM	"Leave Me Alone"	
1967	"Baila Maria"	—	—	Amy	"Gimme, Gimme, Gimme"	
1969	"Pushy"	—	—	Warner Bros.	"You Loser, You Fool"	
1970	"Hard to Be Without You"	—	—	RCA Victor	"You're in a Bad Way"	
1970	"So Sing the Children on the Avenue"	—	—	RCA Victor	"Land of the Midnight Sun"	
