= Earthen Grave =

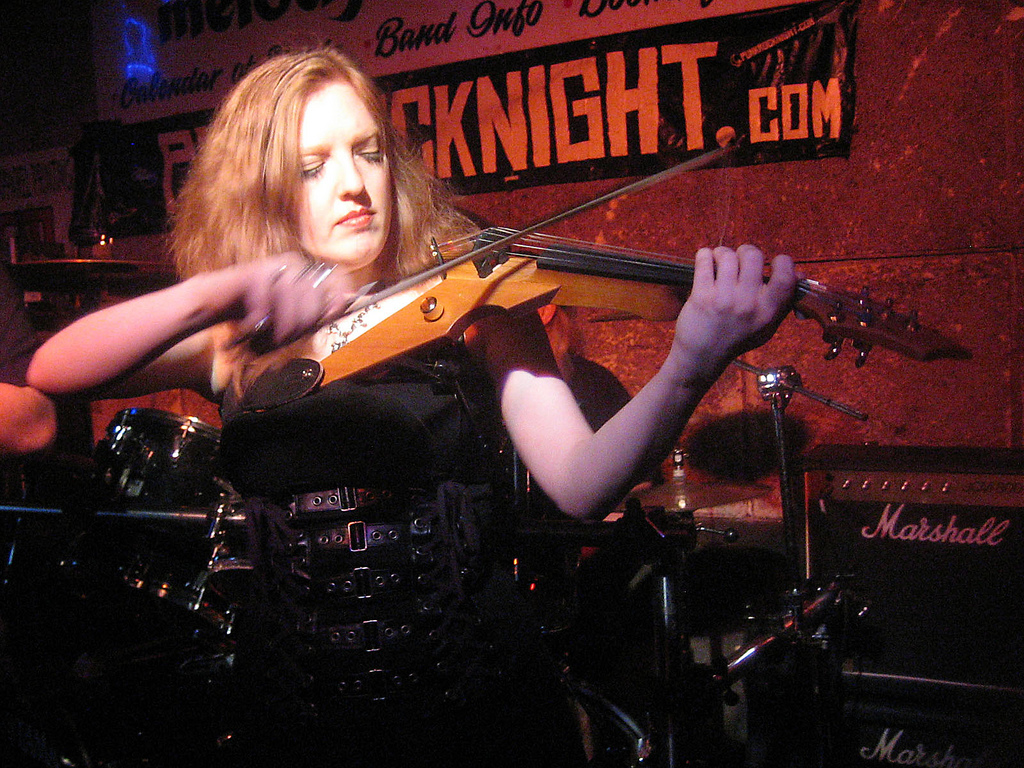
- Rachel Barton Pine on electric violin

Background information
- Origin: Chicago, Illinois, U.S.
- Genres: Thrash metal, doom metal
- Years active: 2008–2014
- Past members: Mark Weiner; Rachel Barton Pine; Tony Spillman; Jason Muxlow; Ron Holzner; Scott Davidson; Chris Wozniak
- Website: earthengrave.com

Earthen Grave was an American thrash/doom metal band from Chicago, Illinois, formed in 2008, featuring violinist Rachel Barton Pine.

== History ==
Earthen Grave was founded late in 2008, as Jason Muxlow was working on a new album for The Living Fields, listening to a lot of Saint Vitus (an '80s doom metal band) and writing down various doom metal guitar riffs. Looking for who might be able to play this style of music with him, Muxlow reached out to drummer Scott Davidson, General Manager of Chicago's WPJX 'Rebel Radio' heavy metal radio station, and "things just snowballed.”

They then enlisted bassist Ron Holzner, formerly of Trouble, to help with this new project. Muxlow says of the first jam as a trio, “The first rehearsal was tough, but after we sorted out some issues with downtuning, things really jelled.”

The trio put out a classified ad on Craigslist looking for a vocalist, and Mark Weiner responded the very next day.

Davidson, who had known violin virtuoso Rachel Barton Pine for many years through the Chicago metal scene, invited her to a rehearsal. Until this point in her career, Barton Pine had played only on a traditional acoustic violin, but participated in the band rehearsal using her new amplified six-string "Viper", an extended-range instrument related to the electric violin invented by Mark Wood. The band invited Barton Pine to join them shortly thereafter.

Tony Spillman was the final member to join Earthen Grave, having previously worked with such bands as Ministry, Prong, and Trouble.

In early June 2009, the band spent a weekend Farview Recording in St. Charles, IL and recorded their first demo, Dismal Times.

On the evening of July 11, 2010, Earthen Grave performed at Chicago's Millennium Park as part of the Great Performers of Illinois celebration.

In January 2011, the band was named the "2010 Best New Entertainer" at the Chicago Music Awards.

On September 22, 2014, it was announced that Earthen Grave had disbanded.

== Media / Attention ==
After releasing their demo EP, the band received promising attention from even mainstream media, and performed live on NBC's "Today" program on September 25, 2009 following a profile segment focusing on Barton Pine.

The band also received a short profile on the Chicago Reader's The List ("Critics' Choices and other notable concerts") by local music critic Monica Kendrick, specifically noting the unique sound brought to the group by Barton Pine's violin.

The band was also broadcast live December 16, 2009, on WGN-TV's "Midday News" program.

Besides the level of media coverage unusual for the genre, the young Earthen Grave had, as of January 2010, already opened for some big names of metal, such as Megadeth, Pentagram and Anvil.

== Band members ==
Last known lineup

- Mark Weiner – vocals (2008–2014)
- Tony Spillman – guitar (2008–2014)
- Jason Muxlow – guitar (2008–2014)
- Ron Holzner – bass guitar (2008–2014)
- Rachel Barton Pine – electric violin (2008–2014)
- Chris Wozniak – drums (2012–2014)

Earlier members

- Scott Davidson – drums (2008–2012)

== Discography ==
- Dismal Times (Demo, 2009)
- Earthen Grave (Claude and Elmo Music: CECD001, 2012) (re-released in 2013 with additional tracks via Ripple Music)
