= King James (band) =

Heavy metal band

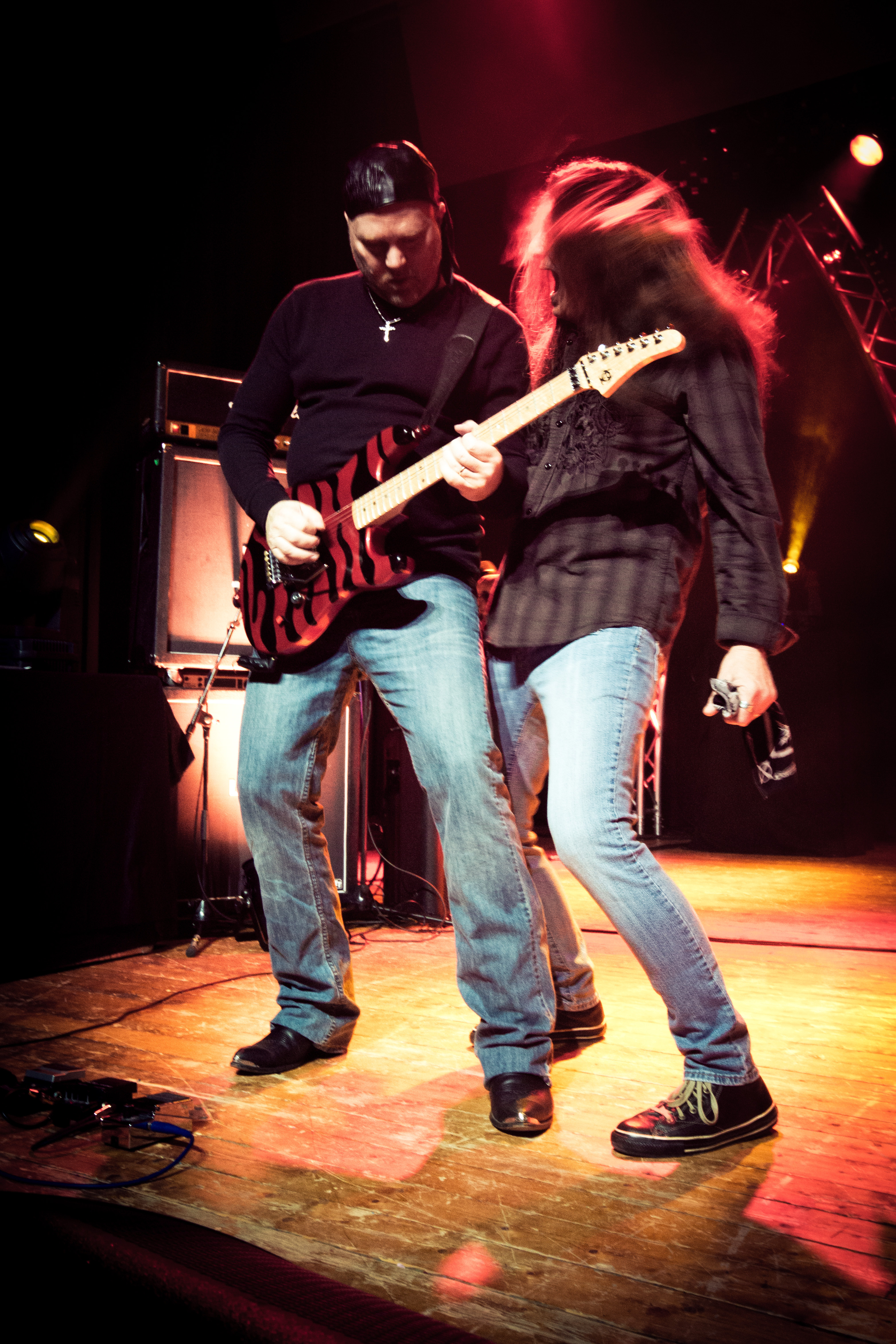
- Carroll and Bennett performing in 2013.

Background information
- Genres: Heavy metal
- Years active: 1993–1997, 2012–present
- Members: Rex Carroll; Jimi Bennett; Benny Ramos; Michael Feighan
- Past members: Tim Gaines; Robert Sweet
- Website: kingjamesband.com

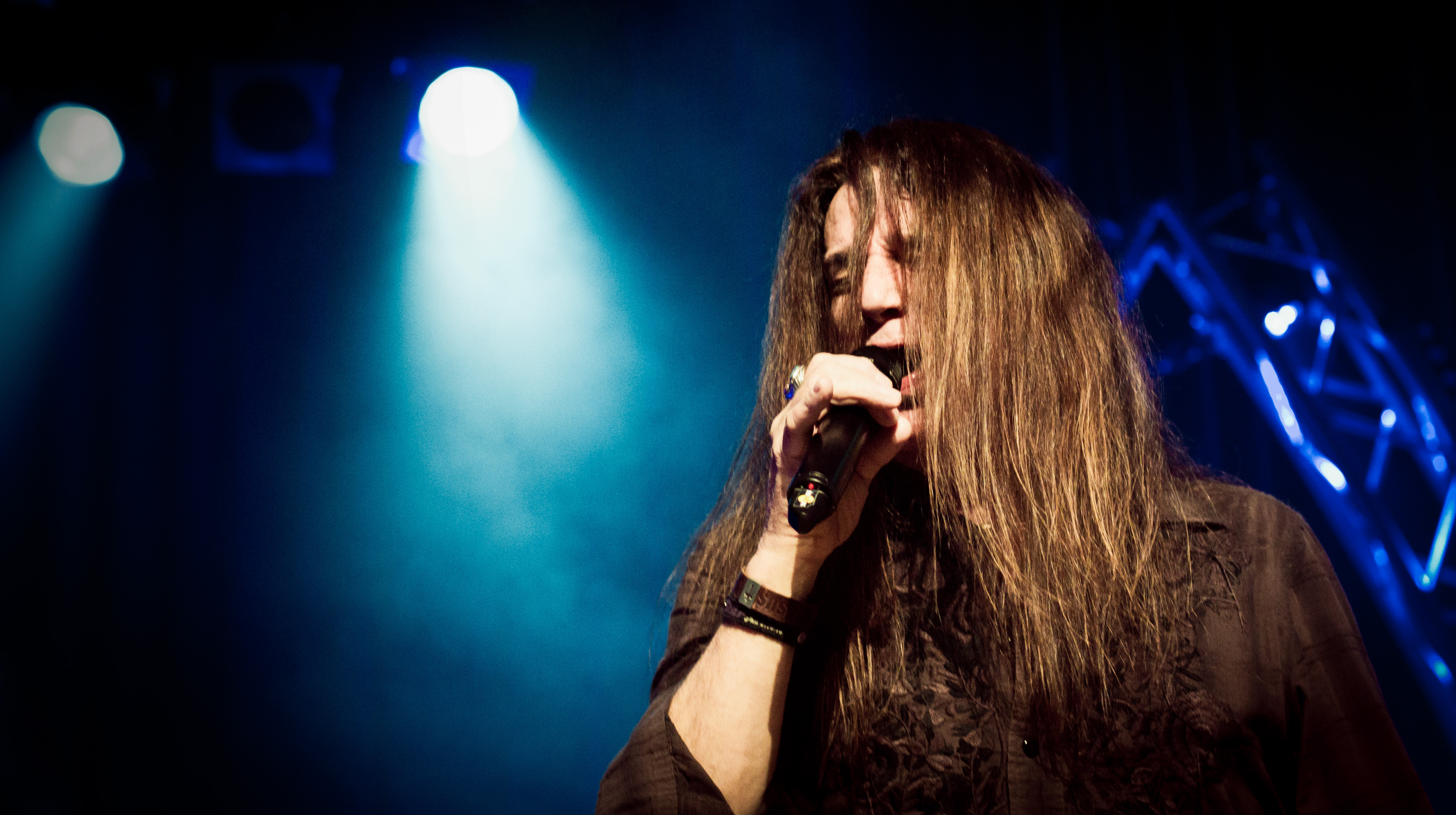
Jimi Bennett performing in Elements of Rock in Switzerland 2013.

King James is a heavy metal supergroup formed in 1993 with guitarist Rex Carroll (Whitecross) and frontman Jimi Bennett (Sacred Fire). Some time later, they recruited Tim Gaines and Robert Sweet of Stryper, and released their first album in 1994. The band supported the album with a tour without Gaines, who declined to join after the recording. Sweet toured with the band into 1996, but did not participate in their second release. Carroll and Bennett remained together and released a second album, The Fall, in 1997.

At that time there was talk of another King James release, but Whitecross regrouped, and Jimi joined former Petra drummer Louie Weaver to form Viktor. Both groups have released new CDs as of 2006. After fulfilling those obligations, the band regrouped and released MaXimus in June 2013.

== Members ==
- Rex Carroll – guitar
- Jimi Bennett – vocals
- Benny Ramos – bass guitar
- Michael Feighan – drums

== Former members ==
- Tim Gaines – bass guitar
- Robert Sweet – drums
- Ean Evans - bass guitar

== Discography ==
- 1993: Three-song demo
- 1994: King James (Star Song / EMI)
- 1997: The Fall (Viva Europe)
- 2013: MaXimus (Madison Line Records)
