= Zebra (American band) =

American hard rock band

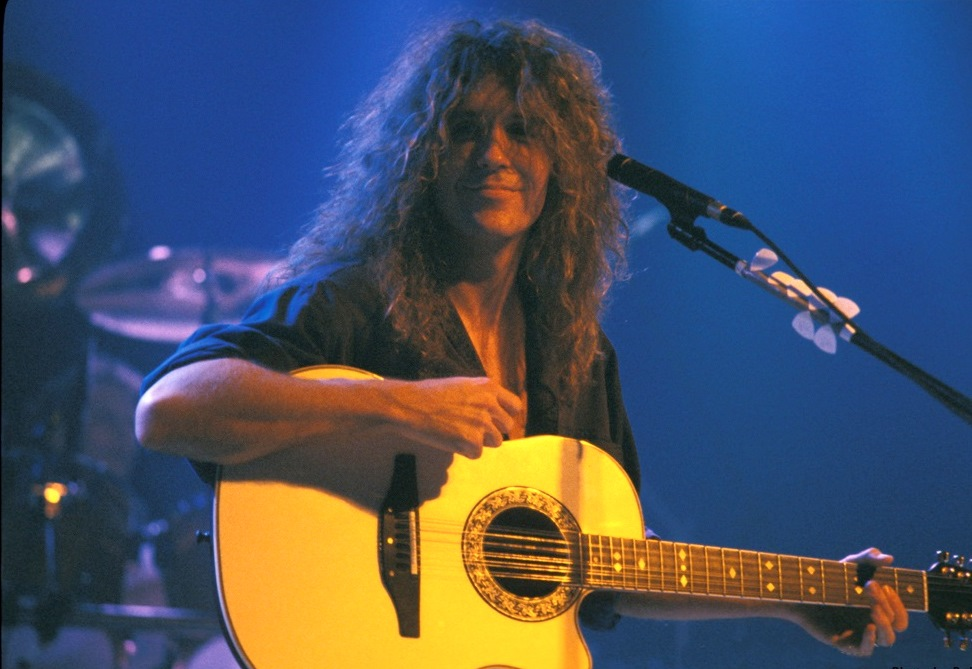
- Randy Jackson of Zebra (2010)

Background information
- Origin: New Orleans, Louisiana, U.S.
- Genres: Hard rock; progressive rock; heavy metal
- Years active: 1975–1990; 1994–present
- Labels: Atlantic, Mayhem
- Members: Randy Jackson; Felix Hanemann; Guy Gelso

Zebra is an American hard rock band founded in 1975 in New Orleans, Louisiana. The band was founded by guitarist and lead vocalist Randy Jackson, bassist Felix Hanemann and drummer Guy Gelso, a lineup that has remained since its inception. To date, Zebra has released five studio albums.

== History ==
In the early 1970s, Jackson and Hanemann played together in a bar band called Shepherd's Bush, but in late 1974 they left Shepherd's Bush and founded a new band, Maelstrom, with Gelso on drums and Tim Thorson on keyboards. The group initially was a cover band, playing Led Zeppelin and other technically proficient rock groups such as Yes, Jethro Tull, and Pink Floyd.

But in February 1975, after Thorson left, the band decided to stay as a trio, with Hanemann handling keyboards as well as bass. They then adopted the name Zebra after seeing a cover of the magazine Vogue featuring a woman riding a zebra. Initially based in New Orleans, they increasingly played more often on Long Island, and eventually all three members moved there to pursue success. They had introduced their original material into their cover sets years before they were signed to Atlantic Records, including "The La La Song", "Free" and "Bears" (originally entitled "The Bears are Hibernating").

Zebra had been noticed by local colleges and even had some of their early original performances recorded by Long Island FM radio station WBAB, culminating in the inclusion of one of their songs on a release of "WBAB Homegrown Album", which commemorated local acts and performances culled from the station's on-air "Homegrown Hour" program.

Zebra's mainstream debut on Atlantic Records was in 1983 with their eponymous album, produced by Jack Douglas and featuring the singles "Tell Me What You Want" and "Who's Behind The Door?" The band continued to tour throughout the 1980s but took a temporary break in the early 1990s after being dropped by Atlantic Records. Randy Jackson formed his solo band Randy Jackson's China Rain, and released its only album in 1991.

Zebra finally resumed playing in 1994 and released Zebra IV in 2003, their first album of all-new material since 1986. A DVD of live performances, mostly from a show at the House of Blues in New Orleans, was released in the summer of 2007.

During the first half of 2007, drummer Bobby Rondinelli filled in for Guy Gelso, who was undergoing treatment for chest cancer. Fortunately, he came through it and was back with Zebra by the end of that year.

On July 10, 2010, during their 35th-anniversary performance at New Orleans' Mahalia Jackson Theater, Zebra was inducted into The Louisiana Music Hall of Fame and on October 8, 2012 they were also inducted into the Long Island Music Hall of Fame.

In March 2013, Zebra performed on Cruise to the Edge, a concert cruise featuring notable progressive rock bands including Yes, Steve Hackett, UK, Carl Palmer Band, Ambrosia, Saga, Nektar, Glass Hammer and IOEarth.

Although Zebra had not released any studio material for more than 20 years, the band continued to perform live, mostly in the Gulf Coast and East Coast of the United States, including New Orleans and New York City.

In February 2017 Jackson reported to Shreveport Times that the band was working on a new album: "I have new material and hopefully we'll get to work on a new record in the next couple of months." The new album, which saw the band reunite with producer Jack Douglas, who produced Zebra's first two albums, was planned for release in 2025 to coincide with the band's 50th anniversary. However, the release of the album, now titled V, was delayed to November 13, 2026. In addition, a documentary on Zebra, tentatively titled Tell Me What You Want: 50 Years of Zebra, is in the works.

== Band members ==
- Randy Jackson – guitars, lead vocals, percussion, keyboards, synthesizers, mellotron, piano (1975–present)
- Felix Hanemann – bass, backing vocals, strings, keyboards, synthesizers (1975–present)
- Guy Gelso (born October 29, 1951, Oakland, California) – drums, percussion, backing vocals (1975–present)

== Discography ==
=== Studio albums ===
Year	Title	Chart Positions	Notes
Year	Title	Billboard 200	Notes
1983	Zebra	29	Gold album
1984	No Tellin' Lies	84	
1986	3.V	—	Last album on Atlantic Records
2003	Zebra IV	—	First album in 17 years
2026	Zebra V	—	First album in 23 years

=== Live albums ===
- Live (1990)
- King Biscuit Flower Hour (1999)

=== Compilation albums ===
- The Best of Zebra: In Black and White (1998)

=== Singles ===
Year	Title	Chart Positions		Album
Year	Title	US Hot 100	US Mainstream Rock	Album
1983	"Who's Behind the Door"	61	10	Zebra
1983	"Tell Me What You Want"	107	29	Zebra
1984	"Bears"	—	15	No Tellin' Lies
1984	"Lullaby"	—	—	No Tellin' Lies
1984	"Summer's Gone"	—	—	No Tellin' Lies
1986	"You're Only Losing Your Heart"	—	—	3.V

=== Video albums and concert films ===
- Zebra Videos And More VHS (1999)
- Zebra the DVD (2007) Produced by Peter Kuperschmid directed by Scot Jay

== Awards and nominations ==
Year	Title	Notes	Ref(s)
2010	Louisiana Music Hall of Fame	Inductee; Mahalia Jackson Theater 35th Anniversary Concert	
2012	Long Island Music Hall of Fame	Inductee	
