= Kimberley Dahme =

American musician (born 1966)

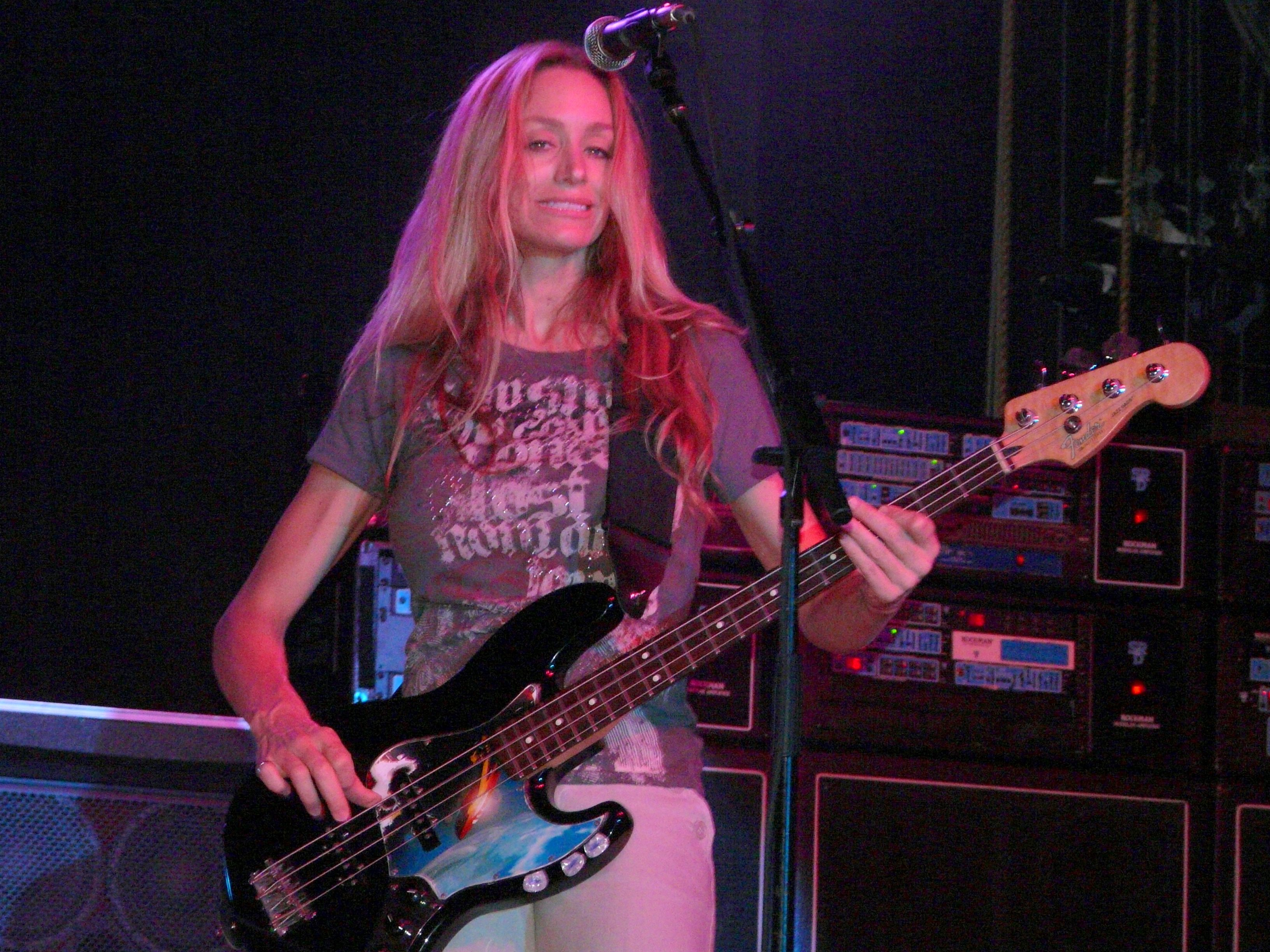
- Dahme performing in 2008

Background information
- Born: April 22, 1966 (age 60); San Pablo, California, U.S.
- Genres: Country music, rock
- Occupations: Musician, songwriter
- Instruments: Vocals, bass, guitar
- Years active: 2001–present
- Website: kdsongs.com

Kimberley Dahme (born April 22, 1966) is an American rock/country musician who is best known as a former member of the rock band Boston. She played bass, rhythm guitar and provided vocals.

== Career ==
Dahme became the first female member of Boston in 2002. She learned to play the bass and began performing with Boston at the 2002 Fiesta Bowl and toured for the Corporate America album. Her song "With You" is also featured on Corporate America. She has been featured on many Boston songs since as a vocalist, taking lead vocals on "If You Were in Love", both versions of "You Gave Up on Love", and "God Rest Ye Metal Gentleman."

In 2010, Dahme participated in a tribute album titled Mister Bolin's Late Night Revival, a compilation of 17 previously unreleased tracks written by guitar legend Tommy Bolin who died in 1976. The album includes other artists such as HiFi Superstar, Doogie White, Eric Martin, Troy Luccketta, Jeff Pilson, Randy Jackson, Rachel Barton, Rex Carroll, Derek St. Holmes, and The 77's. A percentage of the proceeds from this project benefited the Jackson Recovery Centers.

Dahme once performed in a Boston cover band. She has produced several country solo music albums.
