= No Tellin' Lies =

Studio album by Zebra
- Released: September 1984
- Genre: Hard rock
- Length: 39:00
- Label: Atlantic
- Producer: Jack Douglas

Zebra chronology
Zebra (1983)	No Tellin' Lies (1984)	3.V (1986)

Professional ratings
Review scores
Source	Rating
Allmusic	2.5/5 stars

No Tellin' Lies is the second album by New Orleans–based hard rock trio Zebra, released in 1984 by Atlantic Records. The album was a commercial disappointment, peaking at No. 84. However, "Bears" did get some radio airplay on hard rock stations.

The original compact disc version was made in West Germany for the US market in 1984 and is very rare. It was reissued in 2007 as a 2-on-1 CD along with the third Zebra album 3.V, which had been deleted as well. Long out-of-print in single disc form for decades, No Tellin' Lies became available again as a stand-alone CD in 2013, with separate reissues from the UK-based Rock Candy Records and as part of a reissue of the first three Zebra albums in Japan.

== Track listing ==
No.	Title	Writer(s)	Length
1.	"Wait Until the Summer's Gone"	Randy Jackson	3:36
2.	"I Don't Like It"	Jackson	4:00
3.	"Bears"	Jackson	4:33
4.	"I Don't Care"	Jackson	3:05
5.	"Lullaby"	Jackson	4:46
6.	"No Tellin' Lies"	Jackson	3:30
7.	"Takin' a Stance"	Jackson	3:42
8.	"But No More"	Jackson, Angie Aliciatore, Guy Gelso	4:56
9.	"Little Things"	Felix Hannemann	3:26
10.	"Drive Me Crazy"	Jackson, Hannemann	3:31

== Personnel ==
=== Zebra ===
- Randy Jackson – guitars, lead vocals (all but track 9), keyboards
- Felix Hanemann – bass, backing and lead vocals on track 9 and co-lead vocals on track 10, keyboards
- Guy Gelso – drums, backing vocals, percussion

=== Additional musicians ===
- Stan Bronstein: Saxophone, Synthesizers
- Michael Finlayson: Programming
- George Small: Piano (2, 7)
- Bob Rosa: Programming

== Production ==
- Produced By Jack Douglas
- Engineers: Ron Cote, Bill Dooley, Michael Finlayson, Bob Rosa
- Assistant Engineers: Eddie Garcia, Roey Shamir
- Mixing: Bill Dooley

== Charts ==
Chart (1984)	Peak position
US Billboard 200	84
