= Whitecross (album) =

Studio album by Whitecross
- Released: September 5, 1987
- Genre: Christian metal
- Length: 39 minutes
- Label: Pure Metal

Whitecross chronology
Whitecross (1987)	Love on the Line (1988)

Singles from Whitecross
- 1. "You're Mine" Released: 1987

Whitecross is the debut album from the Christian metal band Whitecross, released on September 5, 1987. It reached No. 17 on Billboard's Top Contemporary Christian Albums chart. In 2010, HM Magazine listed Whitecross No. 29 on its Top 100 Christian Rock Albums of All Time list stating that "listen to this album. It'll blow your mind. It's simplistic '80s metal to a fault (think Ratt with Jesus-first lyrics), but the shredding lead guitar by Rex Carroll in every fill, nook, and cranny is primo." Heaven's Metal fanzine ranked it No. 4 on its Top 100 Christian metal albums of all-time list.

== Track listing ==
No.	Title	Length
1.	"Who Will You Follow"	4:02
2.	"Enough Is Enough"	5:44
3.	"He Is the Rock"	4:34
4.	"Lookin' for a Reason"	3:33
5.	"You're Mine"	4:03
6.	"No Way I'm Goin' Down"	4:12
7.	"Seein' Is Believin'"	4:28
8.	"All I Need"	4:13
9.	"Nagasake"	1:53
10.	"Signs of the End"	4:00

== Band members ==
- Scott Wenzel – Vocals
- Rex Carroll – Guitars
- Mark Hedl – Drums
- Jon Sproule – Bass
