= In the Kingdom =

Studio album by Whitecross
- Released: March 1991
- Recorded: 1990–1991
- Genre: Christian metal, glam metal
- Label: Star Song

Whitecross chronology
Triumphant Return (1989)	In the Kingdom (1991)	High Gear (1992)

Professional ratings
Review scores
Source	Rating
Cornerstone	(not rated)

In the Kingdom was the fourth album by Christian metal band Whitecross. It reached No. 12 on Billboard's Top Contemporary Christian Albums chart. The album won a Dove Award for Hard Music Album of the Year for 1991.

The video for the song "No Second Chances" was the band's first video ever seen on MTV's Headbangers Ball.

== Track listing ==
No.	Title	Writer(s)	Length
1.	"No Second Chances"	Scott Wenzel, Rex Carroll	4:43
2.	"We Know What's Right"	Wenzel, Carroll	6:06
3.	"In The Kingdom"	Dez Dickerson	5:20
4.	"In His Hands"	Wenzel, Dwight Liles	3:37
5.	"Good Enough"	Wenzel, Carroll	3:58
6.	"Love Is Our Weapon"	Wenzel, Carroll	4:41
7.	"The Eternal Fire" (guitar solo)	Carroll	2:00
8.	"You Will Find It There"	Wenzel, Carroll	6:00
9.	"If He Goes Before Me"	Greg Hodge, Barry Graul	4:13
10.	"Tell Me The Time"	Wenzel, Carroll	4:29
11.	"Holy War" (featuring Alton Hood of D.O.C.)	Wenzel, Carroll	5:55
Total length:			51:02

== Band members ==
- Scott Wenzel - vocals
- Rex Carroll - guitars
- Butch Dillon - bass
- Mike Feighan - drums, vocals
