= Whitecross (band) =

American Christian metal band

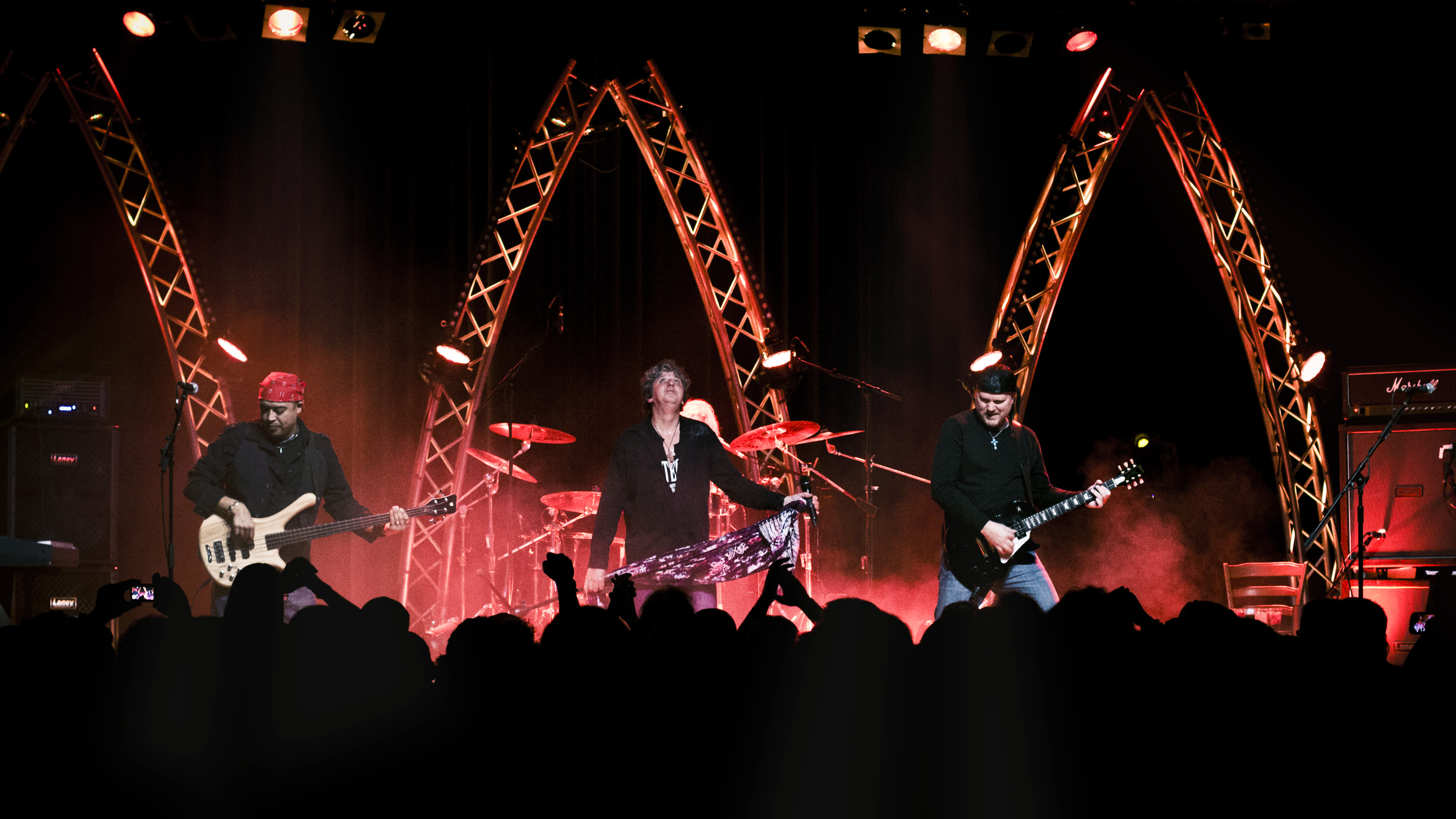
- Whitecross in 2013

Background information
- Origin: Waukegan, Illinois, US
- Genres: Heavy metal, Christian metal, hard rock
- Years active: 1985–present
- Labels: Pure Metal, Star Song, Dark Star
- Members: Dave Roberts; Rex Carroll; Michael Feighan; Benny Ramos
- Past members: Scott Wenzel
- Website: darkstarrecords.net/artists/whitecross

Whitecross is an American Christian metal band from Illinois, formed in 1985 by singer Scott Wenzel and guitarist Rex Carroll, and re-formed in 2000. The band won three Dove Awards in the 1990s.

== History ==
Whitecross formed in 1985 in Waukegan, Illinois, releasing their first recording in 1987. Their early albums, which often invite comparisons to Ratt, are laced with fast, technical guitar work. In 1994, Rex Carroll split with lead vocalist Scott Wenzel. Wenzel retained the name "Whitecross" while Carroll went on to form King James with Jimi Bennett (see below). At this point, the band's sound underwent a drastic change.

Whitecross has won three Dove Awards with Triumphant Return (in 1990) and In the Kingdom (in 1992) winning "Metal Album of the Year" and Come unto the Light from the Unveiled album winning "Hard Music Recorded Song of the Year" at the 25th GMA Dove Awards in 1994.

In 1994 before work starting on the Unveiled album, guitarist Rex Carroll left to form the band King James and pursue other musical ventures. In 1998, singer Scott Wenzel took a two-year break to do mission work in Paraguay, South America. During this time, Whitecross went on hiatus before re-emerging at Cornerstone Festival in 2000 when Carroll and Wenzel re-formed the band with Carroll, Wenzel, Michael Feighan, and newcomer Benny Ramos providing bass, keyboards, and vocals. Finally having achieved a long-sought lineup stability, the band started performing regularly.

In 2005, the band went back into the studio to record Nineteen Eighty Seven, which featured re-recordings of nine of the ten songs from the band's self-titled debut album (You're Mine being the exclusion), as well as a re-recording of the song Love on the Line (previously unavailable on CD) and a new guitar instrumental by Rex Carroll.

On April 5, 2008, they played at the Legends of Rock festival in Ennepetal, Germany. Beginning in July 2008, they played the first of several short tours in Guatemala featuring shows in Guatemala City, Panajachel, Huehuetenango, and other cities.

In 2017, Carroll and Feighan joined with David Bach and Jamie Rowe of Guardian to record Revival, a new compilation of Whitecross and Guardian tracks, and went on a short tour to promote the project.

== Members ==
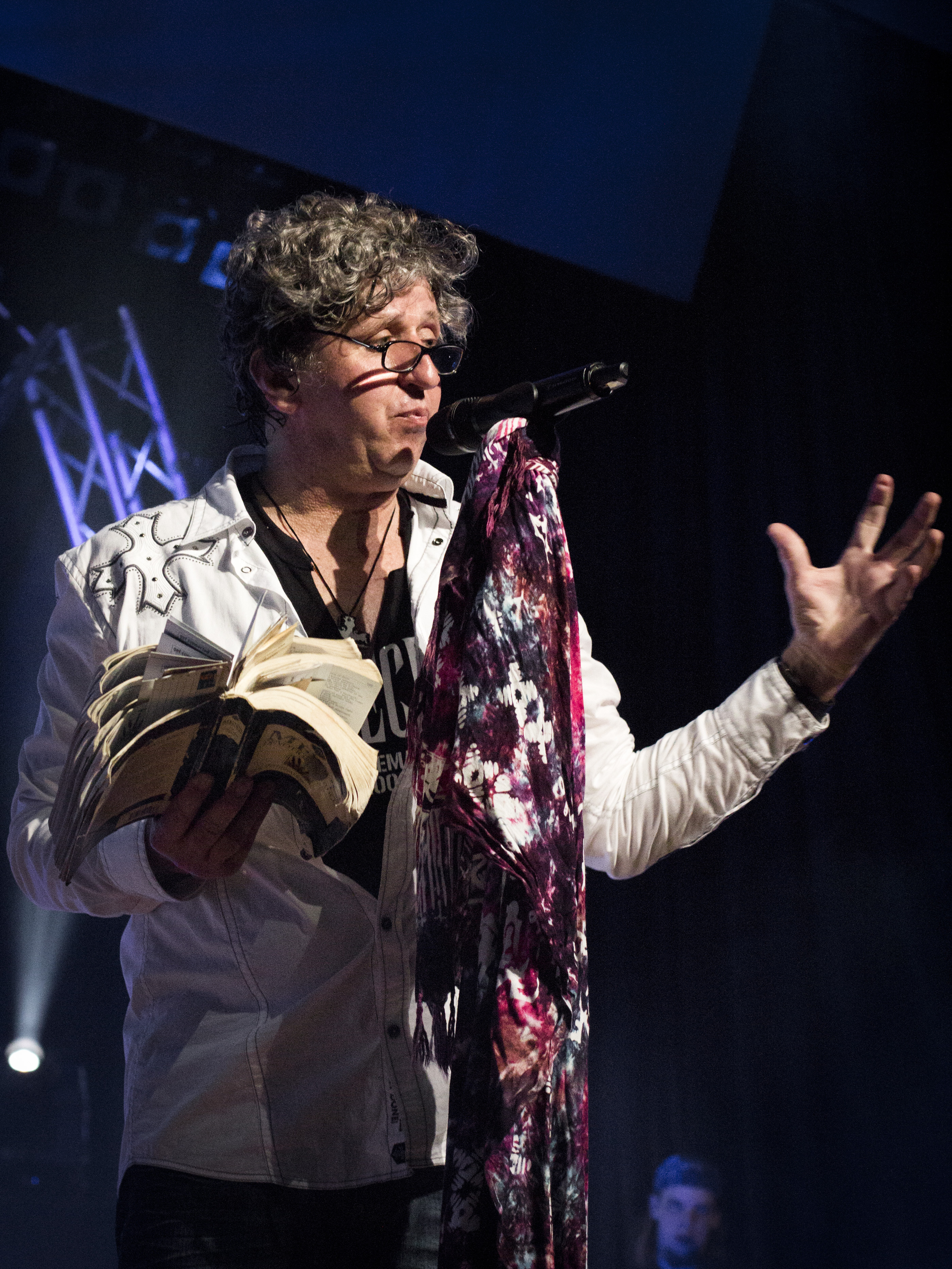
Scott Wenzel on stage in 2013

Current

- Dave Roberts - lead vocals (2020-present)
- Rex Carroll – guitar, vocals (1985–1993, 2000–present)
- Michael Feighan – drums, vocals (1991–1995, 2000–present)
- Benny Ramos – bass guitar, vocals (2000–present)

Former

- Scott Wenzel − lead vocals (founding member) (1985–2018)
- Mark Hedl − drums (1987–1988)
- Jon Sproule − bass guitar (1987–1988)
- Mike Elliott − guitar (1989)
- Rick Armstrong − bass guitar (1989)
- Butch Dillon − bass guitar (1991)
- Scott Harper − bass guitar (1992–1993)
- Barry Graul − guitar (1994–1995)
- Tracy Ferrie − bass guitar (1994–1995)
- Quinton Gibson − guitar (1996)
- Troy Stone − Drums (1996)
- Brent Denny − bass guitar (1996)
- Peter Stenlund − lead vocals (2019–2020)

Timeline

== Albums ==
=== With Rex Carroll ===
Album	Year
Whitecross	1987
Love on the Line (EP)	1988
Hammer & Nail	1988
Triumphant Return	1989
In the Kingdom	1991
High Gear	1992
Nineteen Eighty Seven	2005
Fear No Evil	2024

=== Without Rex Carroll ===
Album	Year
Unveiled	1994
Equilibrium	1995
Flytrap	1996
Unveiled (re-issue)	2005

=== Compilations ===
Album	Year
At Their Best	1991
To the Limit	1993
By Demand	1995
One More Encore	1998
Mega 3 Collection	2005
The Very Best of Whitecross	2006
Their Classic Hits	2009

== Videos ==
- The Reign Goes On - 45 minute VHS, 1992 Star Song Communications

== See also ==
- Contemporary Christian music
- Glam metal
- Heavy metal
