= Zebra (Zebra album) =

Studio album by Zebra
- Released: March 25, 1983
- Genre: Hard rock; heavy metal; pop metal
- Length: 38:54
- Label: Atlantic
- Producer: Jack Douglas

Zebra chronology
| Zebra (1983) | No Tellin' Lies (1984) |

Singles from Zebra
- 1. "Who's Behind the Door? (Mar 1983)"; 2. "Tell Me What You Want (Jul 1983)"

Professional ratings
Review scores
| Source | Rating |
|---|---|
| AllMusic | 4/5 stars |
| Melodic | 3.5/5 stars |

Zebra is the debut studio album by American hard rock band Zebra, released on March 25, 1983, by Atlantic Records. The album features all original material, with the exception of "Slow Down" (a Larry Williams tune best remembered for a 1964 cover version by the Beatles) injected at mid-song with much of the second stanza of Carl Perkins' "Blue Suede Shoes", altered at its end:

"Knock me down, step on my face,
slander my name all over the place;
do anything that you want to do,
what are you tryin' to do?"

The album also features two hits which received national airplay: "Who's Behind the Door?" and "Tell Me What You Want". On the strength of both singles the album became one of Atlantic's fastest-selling debut albums ever and peaked at #29, attaining a level of commercial success the band was unable to repeat on subsequent releases.

"Take Your Fingers from My Hair" was covered by Dream Theater for the special edition of their tenth studio album, Black Clouds & Silver Linings.

This album, along with the follow-up No Tellin' Lies, was remastered and reissued by UK-based company Rock Candy Records in 2013.

== Track listing ==
| No. | Title | Writer(s) | Length |
|---|---|---|---|
| 1. | "Tell Me What You Want" | Randy Jackson | 3:51 |
| 2. | "One More Chance" | R. Jackson | 3:16 |
| 3. | "Slow Down" | Larry Williams, Carl Lee Perkins | 3:25 |
| 4. | "As I Said Before" | R. Jackson | 2:56 |
| 5. | "Who's Behind the Door?" | R. Jackson | 5:09 |
| 6. | "When You Get There" | R. Jackson | 2:56 |
| 7. | "Take Your Fingers from My Hair" | R. Jackson | 7:20 |
| 8. | "Don't Walk Away" | R. Jackson | 3:35 |
| 9. | "The La La Song" | R. Jackson | 6:12 |

== Personnel ==
=== Band members ===
- Randy Jackson – guitar, lead vocals, piano, Mellotron, synthesizer, percussion
- Felix Hanemann – bass, backing vocals, keyboards, strings
- Guy Gelso – drums, backing vocals, percussion

=== Session musicians ===
- Jack Douglas – keyboards (6), percussion (6)
- Mike Grossman – piano (3)
- Eric Troyer – Prophet synthesizer (7)
- Karen Alta – percussion (3)

=== Producer ===
- Jack Douglas

== Charts ==
| Chart (1983) | Peak position |
|---|---|
| US Billboard 200 | 29 |

== Certifications ==
| Region | Certification | Certified units/sales |
|---|---|---|
| United States (RIAA) | Gold | 500,000^{^} |
^{^} Shipments figures based on certification alone.
