= HiFi Superstar =

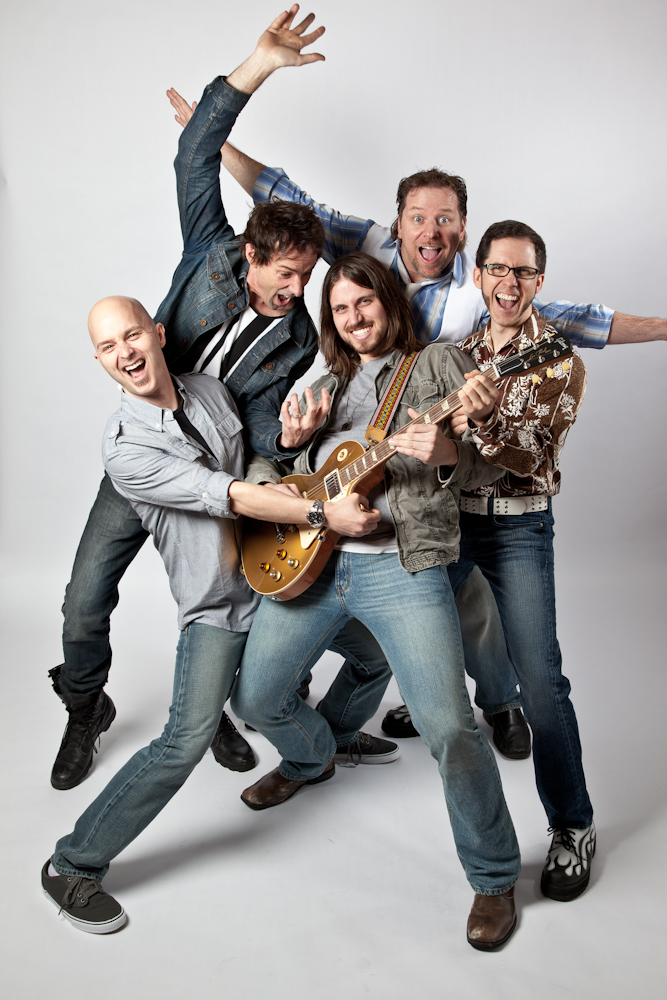

Background information
- Origin: Chicago, Illinois, United States
- Genres: Rock, power pop
- Years active: 1989 - present
- Label: NTD Records
- Members: Mike Paterson; Brad Honeyman; Glenn Mikes; Ron Gonzalez
- Website: www.hifisuperstar.com

HiFi Superstar is a Chicago, Illinois-based rock band known for their 1970s look and original music.

Lead singer and songwriter Mike Paterson began playing with drummer Glenn Mikes in the 1980s hair band Little Venus, opening for such bands as Enuff Z'Nuff and Lillian Axe, before forming the band Liquid Earth. In the early 1990s, Liquid Earth had its first demo produced by Johnny K, who has since worked with such bands as Disturbed, Sevendust, and 3 Doors Down.

In March 2005, Paterson and Mikes joined with bass guitarist Sean Jacobs and keyboardist Dave Rudin to form Brownline Fiasco. Prior to the formation of Brownline Fiasco, Jacobs and Rudin played together in a local cover-band. In preparation for their first album, lead guitarist Michael Danz was added in 2006. Guitarist Sean Fried replaced Danz in 2009 and played with the band until early 2011. In late 2011, Jonny Untch joined the band as the new lead guitarist.

The band formally changed its name from Brownline Fiasco to HiFi Superstar in May 2009. Under the name HiFi Superstar, the band has played with such performers as Missing Persons, Tommy Tutone, Stryper, Cheap Trick, and American Idols' Bo Bice

In September 2006, the band released the CD New Revolution, which included the Billboard Award-winning song, Milk & Honey, written by lead singer and guitarist Mike Paterson. Following almost two years of touring, the band released their follow-up album, Superstar, in June 2008. The album's title song, Superstar, won the band an MTV Video Music Award in 2009.

In 2010, HiFi Superstar participated in a tribute album to the late guitar legend Tommy Bolin. The album, Mister Bolin's Late Night Revival, features songs from other great musicians, such as Jeff Pilson from Foreigner, Eric Martin from Mr. Big, Randy Jackson from Zebra, and Derek St. Holmes from Ted Nugent Band. In addition to their song contribution, It's Up To You, HiFi Superstar's drummer, Glenn Mikes, also recorded and produced track 16, Feel It's Time For Love, by A Gain Of Ten. A percentage of the proceeds from the project will benefit the Jackson Recovery Centers.

HiFi Superstar is managed by NTD Management and is signed to NTD Records, which also manages such acts as 7th Heaven.

== Members ==
=== Current members ===
- Mike Paterson - vocals, guitar
- Ron Gonzalez - lead guitar
- Glenn Mikes - drums, vocals
- Brad Honeyman - bass guitar

=== Former Members ===
- Dave Rudin - keyboard, vocals
- Michael Danz - lead guitar
- Sean Fried - lead guitar
- Jonny Untch - lead guitar
- Sean Jacobs - bass guitar

== Awards ==
- 1st Place: 14th Annual Billboard World Song Writing Contest for their song Milk & Honey
- 4th Spot: MTV Video Music Award for Chicago's Best Breakout Band for their song Superstar
- Top 5 Pop Rock Cover Bands of 2011 by Chicago Rocker Magazine

== Discography ==
- New Revolution (2006)
1. Milk & Honey
2. All My Heart
3. Everything
4. Another Day
5. I Will Go
6. One More Time
7. Wonderful
8. Good Enough
9. Never Be The Same
10. New Revolution
- The Great Independent Rock CD, Volume 1 (2007)
  - Milk & Honey (Track 4, Under Brownline Fiasco)
- Superstar (2009)
1. Lovely Day
2. Superstar
3. Over Our Heads
4. Somewhere
5. Without Love
6. You're Not Alone
7. So Into You
8. Should Have Told Her
9. Heart Won't Lie
10. Let Me Go
11. Look Of Amazement
- Mister Bolin's Late Night Revival (2010)
  - It's Up To You (Track 12)
- One Hit Wonder (2011)
1. Closer
2. Down Low
3. Gimme a Try
4. CYD
5. Love is Enough
6. Middle of Nowhere
7. One Hit Wonder
8. Sunday Afternoon
9. Let it Out
10. Lucky Day
11. Knock on Wood
12. It's Up to You

== In popular culture ==
- October 2010 featured performer on Chic-A-Go-Go television show
- July 2010 performed at WTMX 101.9 FM's Party In The Park
- May 2010 appearance on The Fandick Show
- December 2009 performed Christmas jingle for WXRT 93 FM's show Local Anesthetic
- August 2009 appearance on 105.5 KAT FM's Home Grown Tones
- January 2012 featured on WGN's Morning News Program
- June 2013 featured on WGN's Morning News Program
