= Felix Hanemann =

American singer and musician (born 1953)

- Hanemann performing on keyboards at the 2007 Long Island Maritime Festival

Background information
- Born: May 1, 1953 (age 73); New Orleans, Louisiana, U.S.
- Genres: Hard rock, heavy metal, progressive rock
- Occupation: Musician
- Instruments: Bass guitar, vocals, keyboards, synthesizer, strings
- Years active: 1975–present
- Label: Atlantic

Felix Hanemann (born May 1, 1953) is an American singer and musician.

== Biography ==
=== Early life ===
He graduated from Warren Easton High School and attended the University of New Orleans and Loyola (Music Major, English Minor).

He joined his first band, The Salt & Pepper Conspiracy, when he was 14 yrs old. In 1972 he put together the band Shepherd’s Bush with Randy Jackson as the lead guitarist.

=== Career ===
Hanemann formed the band Zebra in February 1975 with guitarist and singer Randy Jackson and drummer Guy Gelso, with Felix playing bass, keyboards and backing vocals. Atlantic Records signed Zebra in 1982 and their self-titled debut record was released in March 1983. The album stayed on the Billboard charts for eight months, peaking at number 29. Zebra has continued to record and perform, going into their third decade with six albums to their credit.

In 2000 Hanemann released his first solo album, entitled “Rock Candy” and in 2006 he became a member of the band Harry Slash & The Slashtones.

Felix was also the keyboardist/bassist for the popular metro New York area Led Zeppelin tribute band Hindenberg, which also features fellow Slashtoner Steve "Budgie" Werner (drums) and Karl Cochran (guitar), both veterans of the Ace Frehley band amongst other endeavors. Hindenberg's singer is Michael McEwan, also of A Perfect Tool.
